= Archery at the 2021 Islamic Solidarity Games – Men's individual recurve =

Men's Individual Recurve at the 2021 Islamic Solidarity Games
- Venue: Saraçoğlu Sport Complex
- Date: 14–18 August
- Competitors: 49 from 21 nations

Medalists
gold medal	Samet Ak	Turkey
silver medal	Arif Dwi Pangestu	Indonesia
bronze medal	Mete Gazoz	Turkey

Archery at the 2021 Islamic Solidarity Games
Men	Recurve	Compound
Women	Recurve	Compound
Team	Men's recurve
Team	Women's recurve
Mixed team	Recurve

The men's individual recurve competition in archery at the 2021 Islamic Solidarity Games will held from 15 to 18 August at the Saraçoğlu Sport Complex in Konya.

== Qualification round ==
Results after 72 arrows.

Rank	Name	Nation	Score	10+X	X
1	Mete Gazoz	Turkey	687	44	21
2	Samet Ak	Turkey	675	37	11
3	Riau Ega Agatha	Indonesia	665	30	13
4	Muhammed Yıldırmış	Turkey	661	25	9
5	Arif Dwi Pangestu	Indonesia	659	28	10
6	Amirkhon Sadikov	Uzbekistan	658	25	8
7	Alviyanto Bagas Prastyadi	Indonesia	657	27	6
8	Reza Shabani	Iran	654	24	13
9	Robert Nam	Tajikistan	651	25	5
10	Mohammad Hakim Rubel	Bangladesh	645	21	8
11	Ruman Shana	Bangladesh	644	27	6
12	Mohammadhossein Golshani Asl	Iran	643	25	7
13	Yao Yuy Chen	Uzbekistan	642	15	4
14	Ozodbek Ungalov	Uzbekistan	641	14	7
15	Mahammadali Aliyev	Azerbaijan	640	22	6
16	Sagor Islam	Bangladesh	629	17	5
17	Sadegh Ashrafi	Iran	629	15	9
18	Abdalla Alketbi	United Arab Emirates	627	15	3
19	Ibrahim Al-Mohanadi	Qatar	622	15	4
20	Mansour Alwi	Saudi Arabia	621	15	4
21	Abdulrahman Almusa	Saudi Arabia	620	17	7
22	Mongomin Eyeni	Ivory Coast	616	17	4
23	Abdullah Taha	Kuwait	610	20	7
24	Muhammad Mohd Yusuf	Malaysia	609	16	5
25	Wepa Sähedow	Turkmenistan	609	15	1
26	Bryson Ting	Malaysia	605	16	3
27	Rashed Alsubaie	Saudi Arabia	598	10	3
28	Muhammad Rusmadi	Malaysia	595	11	5
29	Abdullah Alharbi	Kuwait	592	12	5
30	Ulukbek Kursanaliev	Kyrgyzstan	589	14	9
31	Faisel Alrashidi	Kuwait	585	9	2
32	Muhammad Noman Saqib	Pakistan	585	8	1
33	Kulchoro Nurmanbetov	Kyrgyzstan	581	11	1
34	Ali Salem	Qatar	580	10	3
35	Obaid Alhammadi	United Arab Emirates	580	9	3
36	Abdur Rehman Hafiz	Pakistan	572	9	3
37	Youssouf Ahmat Albechir	Chad	563	8	2
38	Zaur Gahramanov	Azerbaijan	550	11	5
39	Aleksey Kopnin	Azerbaijan	549	7	3
40	Solomon Semukete	Uganda	543	7	3
41	Bouyo Eiba	Chad	527	10	2
42	Israel Madaye	Chad	524	8	2
43	Sultan Alketbi	United Arab Emirates	519	2	2
44	Mujahid Adam	Sudan	504	4	0
45	Bangoura Seydouba	Guinea	469	6	3
46	Elyas Hezam	Yemen	441	2	0
47	Faisal Mohamed	Sudan	393	5	1
48	Nasr Ahmed Alsayaghi	Yemen	379	3	0
49	Khalid Rashad	Sudan	353	0	0

== Finals ==
Semifinals
1	Mete Gazoz (TUR)	4	28	28	28	29	26
5	Arif Dwi Pangestu (INA)	6	29	23	29	28	29
14	Ozodbek Ungalov (UZB)	4	26	27	27	26	26
2	Samet Ak (TUR)	6	29	26	25	27	28

Gold medal match
5	Arif Dwi Pangestu (INA)	5^{8}	26	27	29	26	27
2	Samet Ak (TUR)	6^{9}	28	22	27	26	28
Bronze medal match
1	Mete Gazoz (TUR)	6	28	28	27
14	Ozodbek Ungalov (UZB)	0	27	26	22

== Elimination round ==
=== Section 1 ===
1/24 finals
33	Nurmanbetov (KGZ)	0	14	13	19
32	Saqib (PAK)	6	21	25	22
17	Ashrafi (IRI)	6	23	25	26
48	Alsayaghi (YEM)	0	6	21	15
49	Rashad (SUD)	0	20	19	14
16	Islam (BAN)	6	27	25	26
41	Eiba (CHA)	0	14	20	17
24	Yusuf (MAS)	6	24	25	24
25	Sähedow (TKM)	6	21	26	19	24	23
40	Semukete (UGA)	5	13	26	22	18	24

1/16 finals
1	Gazoz (TUR)	6	28	30	28
32	Saqib (PAK)	0	24	26	25
17	Ashrafi (IRI)	4	28	23	27	27	27
16	Islam (BAN)	6	28	25	29	26	27
9	Nam (TJK)	6	28	25	28	26	29
24	Yusuf (MAS)	4	27	26	23	28	25
25	Sähedow (TKM)	2	22	24	25	24
8	Shabani (IRI)	6	28	25	24	26

1/8 finals
1	Gazoz (TUR)	7	26	28	29	28
16	Islam (BAN)	1	26	23	25	26
9	Nam (TJK)	6	27	26	25	27
8	Shabani (IRI)	2	24	25	29	26

Quarterfinals
1	Gazoz (TUR)	6	27	29	27
9	Nam (TJK)	0	25	28	26

=== Section 2 ===
1/24 finals
37	Albechir (CHA)	0	22	20	24
28	Rusmadi (MAS)	6	24	21	26
21	Almusa (KSA)	6	24	26	24
44	Adam (SUD)	0	21	23	23
45	Seydouba (GUI)	0	14	9	16
20	Alwi (KSA)	6	25	23	26
29	Alharbi (KUW)	6	25	22	22	17	23
36	Hafiz (PAK)	5	24	24	18	22	23

1/16 finals
5	Pangestu (INA)	6	26	28	30
28	Rusmadi (MAS)	0	24	22	28
21	Almusa (KSA)	6	24	26	27	29
12	Asl (IRI)	2	25	25	24	25
13	Chen (UZB)	6	27	26	28
20	Alwi (KSA)	0	26	21	24
29	Alharbi (KUW)	0	23	24	23
4	Yıldırmış (TUR)	6	29	28	27

1/8 finals
5	Pangestu (INA)	6	25	28	26	28	27
21	Almusa (KSA)	4	25	28	27	26	26
13	Chen (UZB)	0	26	27	28
4	Yıldırmış (TUR)	6	28	28	29

Quarterfinals
5	Pangestu (INA)	6	29	27	29	27	28
4	Yıldırmış (TUR)	5	30	27	28	28	25

=== Section 3 ===
1/24 finals
35	Alhammadi (UAE)	6	23	23	25	27	23
30	Kursanaliev (KGZ)	5	29	24	25	25	22
19	Al-Mohanadi (QAT)	6	23	28	25
46	Hezam (YEM)	0	18	16	10
43	Alketbi (UAE)	0	22	19	22
22	Eyeni (CIV)	6	26	20	25
27	Alsubaie (KSA)	6	22	28	24	27
38	Gahramanov (AZE)	2	23	18	16	16

1/16 finals
3	Agatha (INA)	6	26	28	30
35	Alhammadi (UAE)	0	24	22	28
19	Al-Mohanadi (QAT)	2	26	28	23	27
14	Ungalov (UZB)	6	28	28	27	27
11	Shana (BAN)	6	27	29	30	26	26
22	Eyeni (CIV)	4	26	30	25	27	22
27	Alsubaie (KSA)	0	23	24	23
6	Sadikov (UZB)	6	29	28	27

1/8 finals
3	Agatha (INA)	4	27	24	28	28	28
14	Ungalov (UZB)	6	28	27	26	27	29
11	Shana (BAN)	6	29	29	28	25	27
6	Sadikov (UZB)	4	25	28	30	26	23

Quarterfinals
14	Ungalov (UZB)	6	29	27	29
11	Shana (BAN)	0	27	26	25

=== Section 4 ===
1/24 finals
39	Kopnin (AZE)	0	21	22	21
26	Ting (MAS)	6	25	25	28
23	Taha (KUW)	6	22	26	27	21	25
42	Madaye (CHA)	4	24	19	20	22	23
47	Mohamed (SUD)	0	14	15	20
18	Alketbi (UAE)	6	22	23	27
31	Alrashidi (KUW)	4	24	24	24	23	26
34	Salem (QAT)	6	24	22	24	25	28

1/16 finals
7	Prastyadi (INA)	6	26	28	27
26	Ting (MAS)	0	25	26	25
23	Taha (KUW)	0	24	28	23
10	Rubel (BAN)	6	26	29	28
15	Aliyev (AZE)	6	28	28	24	26	26
18	Alketbi (UAE)	4	21	27	26	26	26
34	Salem (QAT)	0	23	24	23
2	Ak (TUR)	6	29	28	27

1/8 finals
7	Prastyadi (INA)	2	25	27	26	25
10	Rubel (BAN)	6	26	27	26	26
15	Aliyev (AZE)	0	27	28	26
6	Ak (TUR)	6	29	30	28

Quarterfinals
10	Rubel (BAN)	0	25	27	26
2	Ak (TUR)	6	27	28	29
