= Gymnastics at the 2021 Islamic Solidarity Games – Results =

These are the results of the Gymnastics at the 2021 Islamic Solidarity Games which took place between 10 and 18 August 2022 in Konya, Turkey.

== Artistic – Men ==
=== Team ===
10 August

Rank	Team	Floor (gymnastics)	Pommel horse	Rings (gymnastics)	Vault (gymnastics)	Parallel bars	Horizontal bar	Total
1st place, gold medalist(s)	Turkey (TUR)	26.850	27.500	29.000	28.700	29.300	27.200	168.550
2nd place, silver medalist(s)	Uzbekistan (UZB)	26.950	28.050	25.750	27.800	28.150	25.700	162.400
3rd place, bronze medalist(s)	Kazakhstan (KAZ)	26.300	27.550	25.450	28.150	26.650	24.300	158.400
4	Azerbaijan (AZE)	26.100	23.300	28.550	26.050	27.700	25.050	156.750
5	Iran (IRI)	23.900	24.100	28.400	25.150	26.500	24.400	152.450
6	Bangladesh (BAN)	22.150	9.900	14.550	25.600	7.250	1.500	80.950
7	Yemen (YEM)	16.850	10.200		22.550	8.800		58.400
8	Pakistan (PAK)	7.150		6.450	24.350		8.750	46.700

=== Individual all-around ===
10 August

Rank	Athlete	Floor (gymnastics)	Pommel horse	Rings (gymnastics)	Vault (gymnastics)	Parallel bars	Horizontal bar	Total
1st place, gold medalist(s)	Adem Asil (TUR)	13.950	13.300	14.950	14.500	14.200	14.000	84.900
2nd place, silver medalist(s)	Ivan Tikhonov (AZE)	13.100	12.750	14.000	13.450	14.400	13.150	80.850
3rd place, bronze medalist(s)	Rasuljon Abdurakhimov (UZB)	13.500	13.600	12.800	13.800	14.100	12.850	80.650
4	Milad Karimi (KAZ)	13.500	13.300	13.600	14.100	14.450	11.650	80.600
5	Ahmet Önder (TUR)	12.900	12.850	14.050	14.200	12.950	13.200	80.150
6	Abdulla Azimov (UZB)	13.450	14.400	11.500	14.000	13.250	12.850	79.450
7	Mehdi Ahmadkohani (IRI)	11.600	11.500	14.700	12.400	13.200	12.900	76.300
8	Mohammad Reza Khosronejad (IRI)	12.250	12.600	13.700	11.600	13.300	10.850	74.300
9	Mansum Safarov (AZE)	13.000	10.550	12.200	12.600	11.650	11.900	71.900
10	Abu Saeed Rafi (BAN)	10.300	9.900	5.250	12.750	7.250	1.500	46.950

=== Floor ===
10–11 August

Rank	Athlete	Qual.	Final
1st place, gold medalist(s)	Ahmet Önder (TUR)	12.900	14.650
2nd place, silver medalist(s)	Dmitriy Patanin (KAZ)	12.800	14.250
3rd place, bronze medalist(s)	Adem Asil (TUR)	13.950	14.200
4	Milad Karimi (KAZ)	13.500	13.650
5	Abdulla Azimov (UZB)	13.450	13.550
6	Mansum Safarov (AZE)	13.000	13.050
7	Ivan Tikhonov (AZE)	13.100	12.800
8	Rasuljon Abdurakhimov (UZB)	13.500	11.550
9	Mohammad Reza Khosronejad (IRI)	12.250	
10	Ali Kader Haque (BAN)	11.850	
11	Khabibullo Ergashev (UZB)	11.800	
12	Rakan Al-Harith (QAT)	11.650	
13	Mohammad Reza Hamidi (IRI)	11.650	
14	Mehdi Ahmadkohani (IRI)	11.600	
15	Abdulaziz Al-Johani (KSA)	11.200	
16	Abu Saeed Rafi (BAN)	10.300	
17	Mahmood Al-Maolegi (YEM)	8.950	
18	Muaadh Dehaq (YEM)	7.900	
19	Muhammad Afzal (PAK)	7.150	
20	Ali Al-Maswari (YEM)	5.950	
21	Shishir Ahmed (BAN)	0.850	

=== Pommel horse ===
10–11 August

Rank	Athlete	Qual.	Final
1st place, gold medalist(s)	Ahmad Abu Al-Soud (JOR)	14.550	14.900
2nd place, silver medalist(s)	Nariman Kurbanov (KAZ)	14.250	14.800
3rd place, bronze medalist(s)	Ferhat Arıcan (TUR)	14.200	14.350
4	Abdulla Azimov (UZB)	14.400	14.350
5	Ivan Tikhonov (AZE)	12.750	14.250
6	Ahmet Önder (TUR)	12.850	13.600
7	Khabibullo Ergashev (UZB)	13.650	11.850
8	Milad Karimi (KAZ)	13.300	10.950
9	Rasuljon Abdurakhimov (UZB)	13.600	
10	Adem Asil (TUR)	13.300	
11	Mohammad Reza Khosronejad (IRI)	12.600	
12	Rakan Al-Harith (QAT)	12.350	
13	Mehdi Ahmadkohani (IRI)	11.500	
14	Mohammad Reza Hamidi (IRI)	10.950	
15	Mansum Safarov (AZE)	10.550	
16	Muaadh Dehaq (YEM)	10.200	
17	Abu Saeed Rafi (BAN)	9.900	

=== Rings ===
10–11 August

Rank	Athlete	Qual.	Final
1st place, gold medalist(s)	Adem Asil (TUR)	14.950	14.900
2nd place, silver medalist(s)	Nikita Simonov (AZE)	14.550	14.850
3rd place, bronze medalist(s)	Ahmet Önder (TUR)	14.050	14.250
4	Ivan Tikhonov (AZE)	14.000	13.900
5	Mehdi Ahmadkohani (IRI)	14.700	13.800
6	Mohammad Reza Khosronejad (IRI)	13.700	13.600
7	Dmitriy Patanin (KAZ)	11.850	12.950
8	Khabibullo Ergashev (UZB)	12.950	12.700
9	Milad Karimi (KAZ)	13.600	
10	Rasuljon Abdurakhimov (UZB)	12.800	
11	Mansum Safarov (AZE)	12.200	
12	Mohammad Reza Hamidi (IRI)	12.000	
13	Abdulla Azimov (UZB)	11.500	
14	Shishir Ahmed (BAN)	9.300	
15	Shah Jahan Barkat (PAK)	6.450	
16	Abu Saeed Rafi (BAN)	5.250	

=== Vault ===
10–11 August

Rank	Athlete	Qual.	Final
1st place, gold medalist(s)	Ivan Tikhonov (AZE)	13.775	14.550
2nd place, silver medalist(s)	Adem Asil (TUR)	13.800	13.625
3rd place, bronze medalist(s)	Ahmet Önder (TUR)	13.475	13.600
4	Dmitriy Patanin (KAZ)	14.200	13.475
5	Ali Kader Haque (BAN)	12.950	12.975
6	Abu Saeed Rafi (BAN)	12.175	12.350
7	Ali Al-Maswari (YEM)	11.225	11.650
8	Muhammad Afzal (PAK)	11.200	11.275
9	Muhammad Sohail (PAK)	11.125	
10	Muaadh Dehaq (YEM)	10.350	

=== Parallel bars ===
10–11 August

Rank	Athlete	Qual.	Final
1st place, gold medalist(s)	Ferhat Arıcan (TUR)	15.100	14.900
2nd place, silver medalist(s)	Ahmet Önder (TUR)	12.950	14.750
3rd place, bronze medalist(s)	Rasuljon Abdurakhimov (UZB)	14.100	14.400
4	Milad Karimi (KAZ)	14.450	14.000
5	Khabibullo Ergashev (UZB)	14.050	13.600
6	Nikita Simonov (AZE)	13.300	12.300
7	Ivan Tikhonov (AZE)	14.400	12.200
8	Adem Asil (TUR)	14.200	
9	Mohammad Reza Khosronejad (IRI)	13.300	
10	Abdulla Azimov (UZB)	13.250	
11	Mehdi Ahmadkohani (IRI)	13.200	
12	Dmitriy Patanin (KAZ)	12.200	
13	Mohammad Reza Hamidi (IRI)	12.100	
14	Mansum Safarov (AZE)	11.650	
15	Nasser Al-Samiri (KSA)	11.050	
16	Ali Al-Maswari (YEM)	8.800	
17	Abu Saeed Rafi (BAN)	7.250	

=== Horizontal bar ===
10–11 August

Rank	Athlete	Qual.	Final
1st place, gold medalist(s)	Ahmet Önder (TUR)	13.200	14.300
2nd place, silver medalist(s)	Milad Karimi (KAZ)	11.650	14.050
3rd place, bronze medalist(s)	Ivan Tikhonov (AZE)	13.150	14.000
4	Rasuljon Abdurakhimov (UZB)	12.850	13.250
5	Khabibullo Ergashev (UZB)	12.050	13.200
6	Mansum Safarov (AZE)	11.900	12.800
7	Adem Asil (TUR)	14.000	12.250
8	Mehdi Ahmadkohani (IRI)	12.900	10.250
9	Ferhat Arıcan (TUR)	12.950	
10	Abdulla Azimov (UZB)	12.850	
11	Dmitriy Patanin (KAZ)	12.650	
12	Nikita Simonov (AZE)	11.700	
13	Mohammad Reza Hamidi (IRI)	11.500	
14	Mohammad Reza Khosronejad (IRI)	10.850	
15	Shah Jahan Barkat (PAK)	8.750	
16	Abu Saeed Rafi (BAN)	1.500	

== Artistic – Women ==
=== Team ===
17 August

Rank	Team	Vault (gymnastics)	Uneven bars	Balance beam	Floor (gymnastics)	Total
1st place, gold medalist(s)	Turkey (TUR)	26.050	24.950	23.300	24.800	99.100
2nd place, silver medalist(s)	Uzbekistan (UZB)	25.450	22.400	23.250	24.600	95.700
3rd place, bronze medalist(s)	Kazakhstan (KAZ)	24.000	21.200	22.450	23.250	90.900
4	Azerbaijan (AZE)	23.800	18.750	18.700	23.350	84.600
5	Indonesia (INA)	12.150	17.500	10.600	10.100	50.350

=== Individual all-around ===
17 August

Rank	Athlete	Vault (gymnastics)	Uneven bars	Balance beam	Floor (gymnastics)	Total
1st place, gold medalist(s)	Bengisu Yıldız (TUR)	13.000	12.150	11.450	12.400	49.000
2nd place, silver medalist(s)	Dildora Aripova (UZB)	12.150	11.900	11.950	12.400	48.400
3rd place, bronze medalist(s)	Sevgi Seda Kayışoğlu (TUR)	12.400	12.800	11.850	11.250	48.300
4	Aida Bauyrzhanova (KAZ)	12.100	11.250	10.800	12.050	46.200
5	Ominakhon Khalilova (UZB)	12.000	10.500	11.100	12.200	45.800
6	Ayazhan Shamshitdinova (KAZ)	11.900	9.950	11.650	11.200	44.700
7	Milana Minakovskaya (AZE)	11.800	9.100	9.950	12.200	43.050
8	Ameera Rahmajanni Hariadi (INA)	12.150	9.800	10.600	10.100	42.650
9	Samira Gahramanova (AZE)	12.000	9.650	8.750	11.150	41.550

=== Vault ===
17–18 August

Rank	Athlete	Qual.	Final
1st place, gold medalist(s)	Oksana Chusovitina (UZB)	13.075	12.984
2nd place, silver medalist(s)	Bilge Tarhan (TUR)	12.925	12.884
3rd place, bronze medalist(s)	Bengisu Yıldız (TUR)	12.725	12.717
4	Dildora Aripova (UZB)	11.925	12.034
5	Ameera Rahmajanni Hariadi (INA)	10.550	11.633
6	Ayazhan Shamshitdinova (KAZ)	11.575	11.083
7	Duha Al-Habshi (QAT)	10.225	
—	Samira Gahramanova (AZE)	DNF	

=== Uneven bars ===
17–18 August

Rank	Athlete	Qual.	Final
1st place, gold medalist(s)	Sevgi Seda Kayışoğlu (TUR)	12.800	12.767
2nd place, silver medalist(s)	Bengisu Yıldız (TUR)	12.150	12.267
3rd place, bronze medalist(s)	Aida Bauyrzhanova (KAZ)	11.250	11.233
4	Milana Minakovskaya (AZE)	9.100	10.867
5	Ameera Rahmajanni Hariadi (INA)	9.800	10.833
6	Dildora Aripova (UZB)	11.900	10.633
7	Ominakhon Khalilova (UZB)	10.500	10.300
8	Ayazhan Shamshitdinova (KAZ)	9.950	9.533
9	Bilge Tarhan (TUR)	10.700	
10	Oksana Chusovitina (UZB)	10.100	
11	Samira Gahramanova (AZE)	9.650	
12	Nadia Indah Amalia (INA)	7.700	

=== Balance beam ===
17–18 August

Rank	Athlete	Qual.	Final
1st place, gold medalist(s)	Dildora Aripova (UZB)	11.950	12.500
2nd place, silver medalist(s)	Aida Bauyrzhanova (KAZ)	10.800	11.967
3rd place, bronze medalist(s)	Bengisu Yıldız (TUR)	11.450	11.900
4	Milana Minakovskaya (AZE)	9.950	11.067
5	Sevgi Seda Kayışoğlu (TUR)	11.850	10.633
6	Ominakhon Khalilova (UZB)	11.100	10.267
7	Ameera Rahmajanni Hariadi (INA)	10.600	9.767
8	Ayazhan Shamshitdinova (KAZ)	11.650	8.300
9	Oksana Chusovitina (UZB)	11.300	
10	Bilge Tarhan (TUR)	11.150	
11	Samira Gahramanova (AZE)	8.750	

=== Floor ===
17–18 August

Rank	Athlete	Qual.	Final
1st place, gold medalist(s)	Aida Bauyrzhanova (KAZ)	12.050	12.800
2nd place, silver medalist(s)	Ominakhon Khalilova (UZB)	12.200	12.500
3rd place, bronze medalist(s)	Bilge Tarhan (TUR)	12.400	12.467
4	Dildora Aripova (UZB)	12.400	12.400
5	Bengisu Yıldız (TUR)	12.400	12.300
6	Samira Gahramanova (AZE)	11.150	11.933
7	Milana Minakovskaya (AZE)	12.200	10.867
8	Ayazhan Shamshitdinova (KAZ)	11.200	10.600
9	Sevgi Seda Kayışoğlu (TUR)	11.250	
10	Ameera Rahmajanni Hariadi (INA)	10.100	

== Rhythmic ==
=== Team ===
13 August

Rank	Team	Hoop (rhythmic gymnastics)	Ball (rhythmic gymnastics)	Clubs (rhythmic gymnastics)	Ribbon (rhythmic gymnastics)	Total
1st place, gold medalist(s)	Azerbaijan (AZE)	66.800	65.750	58.150	61.600	252.300
2nd place, silver medalist(s)	Uzbekistan (UZB)	62.000	65.700	63.400	57.400	248.500
3rd place, bronze medalist(s)	Kazakhstan (KAZ)	59.150	63.400	58.350	59.200	240.100
4	Turkey (TUR)	58.300	57.000	57.700	58.200	231.200
5	Kyrgyzstan (KGZ)	50.700	53.450	47.350	49.650	201.150
6	Lebanon (LBN)	35.900	43.950	44.200	39.950	164.000

=== Hoop ===
13–14 August

Rank	Athlete	Qual.	Final
1st place, gold medalist(s)	Takhmina Ikromova (UZB)	32.900	33.650
2nd place, silver medalist(s)	Zohra Aghamirova (AZE)	35.100	33.000
3rd place, bronze medalist(s)	Elzhana Taniyeva (KAZ)	30.950	32.050
4	Yosmina Rakhimova (UZB)	29.100	31.950
5	Aibota Yertaikyzy (KAZ)	28.200	30.500
6	Kamelya Tuncel (TUR)	31.050	30.150
7	Alina Gozalova (AZE)	31.700	28.900
8	Nilgün Sarıoğlu (TUR)	27.250	28.550
9	Aisha Izabekova (KGZ)	27.050	
10	Lai Yun Jo (MAS)	26.150	
11	Sutjiati Kelanaritma Narendra (INA)	25.550	
12	Sevara Khaitova (KGZ)	23.650	
13	Alissa Sadek (LBN)	19.850	
14	Alessandra Abou Nassar (LBN)	16.050	

=== Ball ===
13–14 August

Rank	Athlete	Qual.	Final
1st place, gold medalist(s)	Elzhana Taniyeva (KAZ)	32.250	32.900
2nd place, silver medalist(s)	Takhmina Ikromova (UZB)	34.000	32.600
3rd place, bronze medalist(s)	Zohra Aghamirova (AZE)	34.200	32.500
4	Alina Gozalova (AZE)	31.550	31.800
5	Kamelya Tuncel (TUR)	30.150	30.500
6	Sabina Tashkenbaeva (UZB)	31.700	29.900
7	Aibota Yertaikyzy (KAZ)	31.150	28.600
8	Aisha Izabekova (KGZ)	27.850	27.900
9	Nilgün Sarıoğlu (TUR)	26.850	
10	Sutjiati Kelanaritma Narendra (INA)	26.050	
11	Sevara Khaitova (KGZ)	25.600	
12	Alissa Sadek (LBN)	23.500	
13	Lai Yun Jo (MAS)	21.200	
14	Alessandra Abou Nassar (LBN)	20.450	

=== Clubs ===
13–14 August

Rank	Athlete	Qual.	Final
1st place, gold medalist(s)	Zohra Aghamirova (AZE)	30.450	32.850
2nd place, silver medalist(s)	Takhmina Ikromova (UZB)	31.850	32.750
3rd place, bronze medalist(s)	Sabina Tashkenbaeva (UZB)	31.550	32.150
4	Ilona Zeynalova (AZE)	27.700	31.000
5	Aibota Yertaikyzy (KAZ)	28.950	29.800
6	Elzhana Taniyeva (KAZ)	29.400	29.500
7	Kamelya Tuncel (TUR)	30.150	27.700
8	Nilgün Sarıoğlu (TUR)	27.550	26.950
9	Lai Yun Jo (MAS)	27.000	
10	Aisha Izabekova (KGZ)	26.100	
11	Alissa Sadek (LBN)	24.800	
12	Sutjiati Kelanaritma Narendra (INA)	24.700	
13	Eliza Maksytova (KGZ)	21.250	
14	Alessandra Abou Nassar (LBN)	19.400	

=== Ribbon ===
13–14 August

Rank	Athlete	Qual.	Final
1st place, gold medalist(s)	Zohra Aghamirova (AZE)	31.200	32.500
2nd place, silver medalist(s)	Takhmina Ikromova (UZB)	28.850	31.350
3rd place, bronze medalist(s)	Elzhana Taniyeva (KAZ)	30.650	31.150
4	Aibota Yertaikyzy (KAZ)	28.550	30.650
5	Kamelya Tuncel (TUR)	30.350	30.300
6	Ilona Zeynalova (AZE)	30.400	29.600
7	Yosmina Rakhimova (UZB)	28.550	29.500
8	Nilgün Sarıoğlu (TUR)	27.850	25.850
9	Sevara Khaitova (KGZ)	25.800	
10	Sutjiati Kelanaritma Narendra (INA)	24.400	
11	Lai Yun Jo (MAS)	24.350	
12	Eliza Maksytova (KGZ)	23.850	
13	Alissa Sadek (LBN)	20.150	
14	Alessandra Abou Nassar (LBN)	19.800	

=== Group all-around ===
13 August

Rank	Team	5	3 2	Total
1st place, gold medalist(s)	Azerbaijan (AZE)	29.950	32.750	62.700
2nd place, silver medalist(s)	Uzbekistan (UZB)	31.800	30.750	62.550
3rd place, bronze medalist(s)	Kazakhstan (KAZ)	29.250	24.500	53.750
4	Malaysia (MAS)	27.450	24.550	52.000
5	Turkey (TUR)	23.300	25.800	49.100
6	Kyrgyzstan (KGZ)	9.700	9.400	19.100

=== 5 hoops ===
13–14 August

Rank	Team	Qual.	Final
1st place, gold medalist(s)	Uzbekistan (UZB)	31.800	34.750
2nd place, silver medalist(s)	Azerbaijan (AZE)	29.950	34.700
3rd place, bronze medalist(s)	Kazakhstan (KAZ)	29.250	30.350
4	Turkey (TUR)	23.300	28.000
5	Malaysia (MAS)	27.450	22.200
6	Kyrgyzstan (KGZ)	9.700	12.400

=== 3 ribbons and 2 balls ===
13–14 August

Rank	Team	Qual.	Final
1st place, gold medalist(s)	Azerbaijan (AZE)	32.750	30.300
2nd place, silver medalist(s)	Uzbekistan (UZB)	30.750	29.900
3rd place, bronze medalist(s)	Turkey (TUR)	25.800	28.250
4	Malaysia (MAS)	24.550	23.050
5	Kazakhstan (KAZ)	24.500	22.300
6	Kyrgyzstan (KGZ)	9.400	10.150

== Aerobic ==
=== Men's individual ===
13–14 August

Rank	Athlete	Qual.	Final
1st place, gold medalist(s)	Vladimir Dolmatov (AZE)	19.500	20.450
2nd place, silver medalist(s)	Mehmet Utku Çırak (TUR)	19.350	19.250
3rd place, bronze medalist(s)	Ali Khalili (IRI)	17.300	18.000
4	Umaru Barrie (SLE)	13.400	13.450
5	Rodrigue Ahissou (BEN)	16.650	13.200

=== Women's individual ===
13–14 August

Rank	Athlete	Qual.	Final
1st place, gold medalist(s)	Ayşe Begüm Onbaşı (TUR)	21.000	21.000
2nd place, silver medalist(s)	Madina Mustafayeva (AZE)	20.000	19.450
3rd place, bronze medalist(s)	Amdivie Kouhounha (BEN)	14.850	14.500
4	Fatu Jalloh (SLE)	14.350	13.350

=== Mixed pair ===
13–14 August

Rank	Team	Qual.	Final
1st place, gold medalist(s)	Azerbaijan (AZE); Vladimir Dolmatov; Madina Mustafayeva	19.500	19.800
2nd place, silver medalist(s)	Turkey (TUR); Can Derviş; Nil Deniz Bal	19.550	19.250
3rd place, bronze medalist(s)	Turkey (TUR); Nihatcan Gül; Nazlı Özgör	19.200	19.000
4	Benin (BEN); Rodrigue Ahissou; Amdivie Kouhounha	14.200	12.850
5	Sierra Leone (SLE); Umaru Barrie; Elizabeth Kamara	10.750	10.950

=== Trio ===
13–14 August

Rank	Team	Qual.	Final
1st place, gold medalist(s)	Turkey (TUR); Mehmet Utku Çırak; Can Sarı; Ahmet Meriç Turmamış	18.400	19.050
2nd place, silver medalist(s)	Azerbaijan (AZE); Vladimir Dolmatov; Khoshgadam Guliyeva; Madina Mustafayeva	17.878	18.444
3rd place, bronze medalist(s)	Iran (IRI); Amir Hossein Baniasad; Alireza Nabipour; Saeid Najafi	17.750	17.800
4	Sierra Leone (SLE); Michael Fornah; Kehinde Ibrahim; Fatu Jalloh	11.111	12.322

=== Team ===
13 August

Rank	Team	Men	Women	Pair	Trio	Total
1st place, gold medalist(s)	Turkey (TUR)	19.350	21.000	19.550	18.400	78.300
2nd place, silver medalist(s)	Azerbaijan (AZE)	19.500	20.000	19.500	17.878	76.878
3rd place, bronze medalist(s)	Sierra Leone (SLE)	13.400	14.350	10.750	11.111	49.611
