= Malaysia at the 2021 Islamic Solidarity Games =

- IOC code: MAS
- NOC: Olympic Council of Malaysia

in Konya, Turkey
- Competitors: 56
- Flag bearer: Khairul Hafiz Jantan
- Medals Ranked 19th: Gold 2 Silver 1 Bronze 4 Total 7

Islamic Solidarity Games appearances (overview)
- 2005; 2013; 2017; 2021; 2025

Malaysia participated in the 2021 Islamic Solidarity Games held in Konya, Turkey from 9 to 18 August 2022.

The games had been rescheduled several times. In May 2021, the ISSF postponed the event to August 2022 citing the COVID-19 pandemic situation in the participating countries.

== Medalists ==
Medal	Name	Sport	Event	Date
1st place, gold medalist(s)	Eugenius Loh Foh Soon; Alang Ariff Aqil Muhammad Ghazalli; Mohd Juwaidi Mazuki	Archery	Men's compound team	17 August
1st place, gold medalist(s)	Mohd Juwaidi Mazuki	Archery	Men's individual compound	18 August
2nd place, silver medalist(s)	Nur Aisyah Zubir	Cycling	Women's scratch	5 August
3rd place, bronze medalist(s)	Nor Sarah Adi	Athletics	Women's pole vault	8 August
3rd place, bronze medalist(s)	Nur Aisyah Zubir	Cycling	Women's omnium	8 August
3rd place, bronze medalist(s)	Mohamad Eizlan Dahalan	Athletics	Men's high jump	12 August
3rd place, bronze medalist(s)	Nur Aina Yasmine Halim; Mohd Juwaidi Mazuki	Archery	Mixed compound team	17 August

Medals by sport
Sport	1st place, gold medalist(s)	2nd place, silver medalist(s)	3rd place, bronze medalist(s)	Total
Archery	2	0	1	3
Athletics	0	0	2	2
Cycling	0	1	1	2
Total	2	1	4	7

== Competitors ==
Sport	Men	Women	Total
Archery	9	7	16
Athletics	7	5	12
Cycling	3	3	6
Karate	5	6	11
Gymnastics	0	7	7
Taekwondo	4	0	4
Total	28	28	56

== Archery ==
=== Men ===
Recurve

Athlete	Event	Ranking round		Round of 64	Round of 32	Round of 16	Quarterfinals	Semifinals	Final / BM	
Athlete	Event	Score	Seed	Opposition Score	Opposition Score	Opposition Score	Opposition Score	Opposition Score	Opposition Score	Rank
Muhammad Mohd Yusuf	Men's Individual	609	24	Eiba (CHA); W 6-0	Nam (TJK); L 4-6	did not advance				17
Bryson Ting	Men's Individual	605	26	Kopnin (AZE); W 6-0	Prastyadi (INA); L 0-6	did not advance				17
Muhammad Rusmadi	Men's Individual	595	28	Albechir (CHA); W 6-0	Pangestu (INA); L 0-6	did not advance				17
Muhammad Mohd Yusuf; Bryson Ting; Muhammad Rusmadi	Men's Team	1809	7	—N/a		United Arab Emirates; W 6–0	Indonesia; L 0–6	did not advance		7

Compound

Athlete	Event	Ranking round		Round of 32	Round of 16	Quarterfinals	Semifinals	Final / BM	
Athlete	Event	Score	Seed	Opposition Score	Opposition Score	Opposition Score	Opposition Score	Opposition Score	Rank
Mohd Juwaidi Mazuki	Men's Individual	694	3	Bye	Albaqami (KSA); W 144-135	Ashikuzaman (BAN); W 150-134	Uslu (TUR); W 147-146	Palizban (IRI); W 148-137	1st place, gold medalist(s)
Alang Ariff Aqil Ghazalli	Men's Individual	678	12	Abdorabboh (QAT); W 147-137	Palizban (IRI); L 144-145	did not advance			9
Eugenius Loh Foh Soon	Men's Individual	677	13	Alabadi (QAT); W 141-138	Kazempour (IRI); W 144-143	Palizban (IRI); L 143-145	did not advance		6
Mohd Juwaidi Mazuki; Alang Ariff Aqil Ghazalli; Eugenius Loh Foh Soon	Men's Team	2049	4	—N/a		Bangladesh; W 227–227	Turkey; W 229–228	Indonesia; W 229–228	1st place, gold medalist(s)

=== Women ===
Recurve

Athlete	Event	Ranking round		Round of 64	Round of 32	Round of 16	Quarterfinals	Semifinals	Final / BM	
Athlete	Event	Score	Seed	Opposition Score	Opposition Score	Opposition Score	Opposition Score	Opposition Score	Opposition Score	Rank
Nurul Fazil	Women's Individual	610	6	Bye	Al-Hajri (YEM); W 6-2	Ahmadova (TJK); W 6-4	Abdollahi (IRI); W 6-4	Coşkun (TUR); L 0-6	Octavia (INA); L 1-7	4
Rohani Tengku	Women's Individual	553	18	Bye	Arista (INA); L 0-6	did not advance				17
Nur Ain Ayuni Fozi	Women's Individual	531	24	Bye	Siddique (BAN); L 1-7	did not advance				17
Nurul Fazil; Rohani Tengku; Nur Ain Ayuni Fozi	Women's Team	1694	6	—N/a		Yemen; W	Bangladesh; L 0–6	did not advance		8

Compound

Athlete	Event	Ranking round		Round of 16	Quarterfinals	Semifinals	Final / BM	
Athlete	Event	Score	Seed	Opposition Score	Opposition Score	Opposition Score	Opposition Score	Rank
Roksana Akter	Women's Individual	682	5	Zaman (BAN); W 139-138	Bostan (TUR); L 143-146	did not advance		5

=== Mixed team ===
Recurve

Athlete	Event	Ranking round		Round of 16	Quarterfinals	Semifinals	Final / BM	
Athlete	Event	Score	Seed	Opposition Score	Opposition Score	Opposition Score	Opposition Score	Rank
Nurul Fazil; Muhammad Mohd Yusuf	Recurve mixed Team	1219	7	Kyrgyzstan; W 5-3	United Arab Emirates; L 2-6	did not advance		6

Compound

Athlete	Event	Ranking round		Quarterfinals	Semifinals	Final / BM	
Athlete	Event	Score	Seed	Opposition Score	Opposition Score	Opposition Score	Rank
Nur Aina Yasmine Halim; Mohd Juwaidi Mazuki	Compound mixed Team	1362	5	Bangladesh; W 151-148	Turkey; L 155-157	Indonesia; W 153-152	3rd place, bronze medalist(s)
