= Bangladesh at the 2021 Islamic Solidarity Games =

- IOC code: BAN
- NOC: Bangladesh Olympic Association

in Konya, Turkey
- Competitors: 42
- Medals: Gold 0 Silver 1 Bronze 2 Total 3

Islamic Solidarity Games appearances (overview)
- 2005; 2013; 2017; 2021; 2025

Bangladesh participated in the 2021 Islamic Solidarity Games held in Konya, Turkey from 9 to 18 August 2022, the Games were rescheduled from 20 to 29 August 2021, the event was postponed to be held from 10 to 19 September 2021 in July 2020 by the ISSF because the original dates were coinciding with the 2020 Summer Olympics, which were postponed due to the COVID-19 pandemic. In May 2021, the ISSF postponed the event to August 2022 citing the COVID-19 pandemic situation in the participating countries.

== Medalists ==
Medal	Name	Sport	Event	Date
Silver	Roksana Akter; Shamoli Ray; Puspita Zaman	Archery	Women's compound team	17 August
Bronze	Md Sagor Islam; Mohammad Hakim Ahmed Rubel; Ruman Shana	Archery	Men's recurve team	17 August
Bronze	Nasrin Akter; Beauty Ray; Diya Siddique	Archery	Women's recurve team	17 August

Medals by sport
Sport	1st place, gold medalist(s)	2nd place, silver medalist(s)	3rd place, bronze medalist(s)	Total
Archery	0	1	2	3
Total	0	1	2	3

== Archery ==
=== Men ===
Recurve

Athlete	Event	Ranking round		Round of 64	Round of 32	Round of 16	Quarterfinals	Semifinals	Final / BM	
Athlete	Event	Score	Seed	Opposition Score	Opposition Score	Opposition Score	Opposition Score	Opposition Score	Opposition Score	Rank
Mohammad Hakim Rubel	Men's Individual	645	10	Bye	Taha (KUW); W 6–0	Prastyadi (INA); L 2–6	did not advance			7
Ruman Shana	Men's Individual	644	11	Bye	Eyeni (CIV); W 6–4	Sadikov (UZB); W 6–4	Ungalov (UZB); L 0–6	did not advance		7
Sagor Islam	Men's Individual	629	16	Rashad (KUW); W 6–0	Ashrafi (IRI); W 6–4	Gazoz (TUR); L 1–7	did not advance			9
Mohammad Hakim Rubel; Ruman Shana; Sagor Islam	Men's Team	1918	5	Bye		Sudan; W 6–0	Iran; W 5–1	Turkey; L 2–6	Saudi Arabia; W 6–0	3rd place, bronze medalist(s)

Compound

Athlete	Event	Ranking round		Round of 32	Round of 16	Quarterfinals	Semifinals	Final / BM	
Athlete	Event	Score	Seed	Opposition Score	Opposition Score	Opposition Score	Opposition Score	Opposition Score	Rank
Mohammad Ashikuzaman	Men's Individual	682	11	Alshalahi (KUW); W 143–133	Hastian (INA); W 146–143	Mazuki (MAS); L 134–150	did not advance		8
Md Sohel Rana	Men's Individual	676	14	Albaqami (KSA); L 139–142	did not advance				17
Mithu Rahman	Men's Individual	665	17	Alobaidi (KSA); L 140–142	did not advance				17
Mohammad Ashikuzaman; Md Sohel Rana; Mithu Rahman	Men's Team	2023	5	Bye		Malaysia; L 227–227	did not advance		5

=== Women ===
Recurve

Athlete	Event	Ranking round		Round of 64	Round of 32	Round of 16	Quarterfinals	Semifinals	Final / BM	
Athlete	Event	Score	Seed	Opposition Score	Opposition Score	Opposition Score	Opposition Score	Opposition Score	Opposition Score	Rank
Diya Siddique	Women's Individual	602	9	Bye	Fozi (MAS); W 7–1	Mamatkulova (KGZ); W 6–0	Anagöz (TUR); L 3–7	did not advance		6
Nasrin Akter	Women's Individual	583	13	Bye	Zamanova (AZE); W 6–4	Octavia (INA); L 1–7	did not advance			9
Beauty Ray	Women's Individual	581	14	Bye	Kanatbek Kyzy (KGZ); L 4–6	did not advance				17
Diya Siddique; Nasrin Akter; Beauty Ray	Women's Team	1766	3	—N/a		Bye	Malaysia; W 6–0	Indonesia; L 4–5	Uzbekistan; W 6–2	3rd place, bronze medalist(s)

Compound

Athlete	Event	Ranking round		Round of 16	Quarterfinals	Semifinals	Final / BM	
Athlete	Event	Score	Seed	Opposition Score	Opposition Score	Opposition Score	Opposition Score	Rank
Roksana Akter	Women's Individual	682	5	Bye	Yıldır (TUR); W 144–140	Bostan (TUR); L 143–146	Süzer (TUR); L 133–136	4
Shamoli Ray	Women's Individual	680	6	Bye	Bybordy (IRI); L 143–144	did not advance		5
Puspita Zaman	Women's Individual	672	8	Halim (MAS); L 138–139	did not advance			9
Roksana Akter; Shamoli Ray; Puspita Zaman	Women's Team	2023	5	—N/a			Turkey; L 222–229	2nd place, silver medalist(s)

== Athletics ==
Men
Track and road events

Athlete	Event	Heat		Semifinal		Final	
Athlete	Event	Result	Rank	Result	Rank	Result	Rank
Imranur Rahman	100 m	10.01 NR	4Q	10.07	4Q	10.17	6

== Handball ==
=== Women's tournament ===
Group A

Pos	Team	Pld	W	D	L	GF	GA	GD	Pts	Qualification
1	Turkey (H)	3	3	0	0	127	62	+65	6	Semifinals
2	Uzbekistan	3	2	0	1	99	89	+10	4	Semifinals
3	Senegal	3	1	0	2	95	87	+8	2	Fifth place game
4	Bangladesh	3	0	0	3	55	138	−83	0	Seventh place game

Rules for classification: 1) Points; 2) Head-to-head points; 3) Head-to-head goal difference; 4) Head-to-head goals scored; 5) Goal difference; 6) Goals scored; 7) Draw.
(H) Hosts

7 August 2022; 13:00	Bangladesh	10–51	Turkey	Selçuklu Municipality International Sports Hall, Selçuklu
7 August 2022; 13:00		(4–26)		Selçuklu Municipality International Sports Hall, Selçuklu

9 August 2022; 13:00	Uzbekistan	42–20	Bangladesh	Selçuklu Municipality International Sports Hall, Selçuklu

11 August 2022; 11:00	Senegal	45–25	Bangladesh	Selçuklu Municipality International Sports Hall, Selçuklu

Seventh place game

12 August 2022	Afghanistan	20–33	Bangladesh	Selçuklu Municipality International Sports Hall, Selçuklu

== Weightlifting ==
Results

Athlete	Event	Snatch		Clean & Jerk		Total	Result
Athlete	Event	Result	Rank	Result	Rank	Total	Result
Srity Akther	Women's -55 kg	70	4	86	4	156	4
Mst Sohayba Rahman Rafa	Women's +87 kg	64	8	84	8	148	8
