= Archery at the 2021 Islamic Solidarity Games – Mixed team recurve =

Mixed team recurve at the 2021 Islamic Solidarity Games
- Venue: Saraçoğlu Sport Complex
- Date: 14–17 August
- Competitors: 36 from 12 nations

Medalists
gold medal	Rezza Octavia; Riau Ega Agatha	Indonesia
silver medal	Yasemin Anagöz; Mete Gazoz	Turkey
bronze medal	Abdusattorova Ziyodakhon; Amirkhon Sadykov	Uzbekistan

Archery at the 2021 Islamic Solidarity Games
Men	Recurve	Compound
Women	Recurve	Compound
Team	Men's recurve
Team	Women's recurve
Mixed team	Recurve

The mixed team recurve competition in archery at the 2021 Islamic Solidarity Games was held from 15 to 17 August at the Saraçoğlu Sport Complex in Konya.

== Qualification round ==
Results after 144 arrows:

Rank	Nation	Name	Score	10+X	X
1	Turkey	Yasemin Anagöz; Mete Gazoz	1332	65	27
2	Indonesia	Rezza Octavia; Riau Ega Agatha	1292	48	17
3	Iran	Mahta Abdollahi; Reza Shabani	1285	37	20
4	Uzbekistan	Abdusattorova Ziyodakhon; Amirkhon Sadykov	1281	42	11
5	Bangladesh	Diya Siddique; Mohammad Hakim Rubel	1247	30	11
6	Azerbaijan	Svetlana Simonova; Mahammadali Aliyev	1235	36	12
7	Malaysia	Nurul Fazil; Muhammad Mohd Yusuf	1219	30	9
8	Tajikistan	Firuza Zubaydova; Robert Nam	1188	27	5
9	United Arab Emirates	Fatima Alblooshi; Abdalla Alketbi	1154	21	6
10	Kyrgyzstan	Diana Kanatbek Kyzy; Ulukbek Kursanaliev	1150	22	11
11	Qatar	Haya Al-Hajri; Ibrahim Al-Mohanadi	1148	26	9
12	Pakistan	Umme Kalsoom; Muhammad Noman Saqib	1145	18	2
13	Chad	Alphonsine Foulkouma; Youssouf Ahmat Albechir	1029	10	2
14	Guinea	Fatoumata Sylla; Bangoura Seydouba	991	10	3
15	Uganda	Moreen Awor; Solomon Semukete	831	9	5
16	Yemen	Sahar Almahjari; Elyas Hezam	570	3	0

== Elimination round ==
1/8 finals
1	Turkey	wo
16	Yemen
9	United Arab Emirates	6	37	33	36
8	Tajikistan	0	26	26	33
5	Bangladesh	5	36	34	32	39
12	Pakistan	3	33	34	36	33
13	Chad	3	28	23	26
4	Uzbekistan	6	36	36	37
3	Iran	6	38	33	39	36
14	Guinea	2	28	34	30	24
11	Qatar	1	28	28	32
6	Azerbaijan	5	33	33	32
7	Malaysia	5	34	36	32	38
10	Kyrgyzstan	3	35	34	32	31
15	Uganda	0	28	22	8
2	Indonesia	6	38	38	39

Quarterfinals
1	Turkey	6	36	36	37
9	United Arab Emirates	0	30	30	32
5	Bangladesh	2	36	35	37	35
4	Uzbekistan	6	37	38	33	36
3	Iran	5	39	34	34
6	Azerbaijan	1	35	34	31
7	Malaysia	2	36	27	37	29
2	Indonesia	6	38	35	36	31

Semifinals
1	Turkey	5	37	37	37
4	Uzbekistan	1	37	36	35
3	Iran	1	36	36	32
2	Indonesia	5	36	38	37

Final
1	Turkey	1	33	36	36
2	Indonesia	5	38	36	37
Third place
4	Uzbekistan	5	35	35	36	37	16
3	Iran	4	31	39	37	31	15
