= Archery at the 2022 Asian Games – Mixed team recurve =

Mixed team recurve at the 2022 Asian Games
- Venue: Fuyang Yinhu Sports Centre
- Dates: 1–4 October 2023
- Competitors: 162 from 27 nations

Medalists
gold medal	Lee Woo-seok; Lim Si-hyeon	South Korea
silver medal	Takaharu Furukawa; Satsuki Noda	Japan
bronze medal	Riau Ega Agata; Diananda Choirunisa	Indonesia

The mixed team recurve archery competition at the 2022 Asian Games was held from 1 to 4 October 2023 at Fuyang Yinhu Sports Centre.

Ranking round classification was ranked based on the combined score of the best men and women archer in the individual ranking round.

== Schedule ==
All times are China Standard Time (UTC+08:00)

Date	Time	Event
Sunday, 1 October 2023	09:00	Qualification round men
Sunday, 1 October 2023	14:20	Qualification round women
Monday, 2 October 2023	09:00	1/8 eliminations
Wednesday, 4 October 2023	14:00	Quarterfinals
Wednesday, 4 October 2023	15:20	Semifinals
Wednesday, 4 October 2023	16:00	Bronze medal match
Wednesday, 4 October 2023	16:20	Gold medal match

== Results ==
Legend

- M — Men
- W — Women

=== Qualification round ===
Rank	Team	Half		Total	10s	Xs
Rank	Team	1st	2nd	Total	10s	Xs
1	South Korea (KOR)	679	689	1368	84	30
M	Kim Je-deok	~~338~~	~~339~~	~~677~~	~~35~~	~~14~~
M	Kim Woo-jin	~~339~~	~~336~~	~~675~~	~~38~~	~~17~~
M	Lee Woo-seok	345	345	690	46	17
M	Oh Jin-hyek	~~339~~	~~342~~	~~681~~	~~37~~	~~12~~
W	An San	~~338~~	~~334~~	~~672~~	~~33~~	~~13~~
W	Choi Mi-sun	~~335~~	~~337~~	~~672~~	~~33~~	~~10~~
W	Kang Chae-young	~~334~~	~~334~~	~~668~~	~~30~~	~~8~~
W	Lim Si-hyeon	334	344	678	38	13
2	China (CHN)	666	680	1346	68	25
M	Li Zhongyuan	~~327~~	~~326~~	~~653~~	~~23~~	~~6~~
M	Qi Xiangshuo	~~335~~	~~333~~	~~668~~	~~33~~	~~11~~
M	Wang Dapeng	~~324~~	~~319~~	~~643~~	~~15~~	~~5~~
M	Wei Shaoxuan	331	339	670	34	13
W	An Qixuan	~~330~~	~~333~~	~~663~~	~~26~~	~~5~~
W	Hailigan	335	341	676	34	12
W	Li Jiaman	~~327~~	~~339~~	~~666~~	~~31~~	~~7~~
W	Zhang Mengyao	~~329~~	~~328~~	~~657~~	~~25~~	~~12~~
3	Chinese Taipei (TPE)	674	666	1340	67	22
M	Su Yu-yang	~~334~~	~~339~~	~~673~~	~~33~~	~~8~~
M	Tai Yu-hsuan	~~310~~	~~327~~	~~637~~	~~22~~	~~13~~
M	Tang Chih-chun	349	338	687	46	16
M	Wei Chun-heng	~~333~~	~~337~~	~~670~~	~~32~~	~~15~~
W	Chiu Yi-ching	~~316~~	~~335~~	~~651~~	~~19~~	~~8~~
W	Kuo Tzu-ying	~~316~~	~~321~~	~~637~~	~~21~~	~~6~~
W	Lei Chien-ying	325	328	653	21	6
W	Peng Chia-mao	~~309~~	~~328~~	~~637~~	~~22~~	~~4~~
4	Indonesia (INA)	663	666	1329	59	12
M	Riau Ega Agata	338	335	673	36	10
M	Ahmad Khoirul Baasith	~~327~~	~~333~~	~~660~~	~~27~~	~~10~~
M	Arif Dwi Pangestu	~~330~~	~~330~~	~~660~~	~~24~~	~~9~~
M	Alviyanto Prastyadi	~~323~~	~~323~~	~~646~~	~~23~~	~~9~~
W	Diananda Choirunisa	325	331	656	23	2
W	Rezza Octavia	~~308~~	~~313~~	~~621~~	~~19~~	~~4~~
W	Anindya Nayla Putri	~~274~~	~~307~~	~~581~~	~~8~~	~~1~~
W	Catharine Thea Darma	~~237~~	~~245~~	~~482~~	~~5~~	~~1~~
5	India (IND)	659	668	1327	62	23
M	Dhiraj Bommadevara	~~344~~	~~331~~	~~675~~	~~40~~	~~12~~
M	Mrinal Chauhan	~~329~~	~~338~~	~~667~~	~~32~~	~~16~~
M	Atanu Das	343	335	678	36	14
M	Tushar Shelke	~~335~~	~~334~~	~~669~~	~~30~~	~~11~~
W	Ankita Bhakat	316	333	649	26	9
W	Bhajan Kaur	~~311~~	~~329~~	~~640~~	~~24~~	~~6~~
W	Simranjeet Kaur	~~314~~	~~326~~	~~640~~	~~22~~	~~4~~
W	Prachi Singh	~~292~~	~~301~~	~~593~~	~~10~~	~~5~~
6	Japan (JPN)	650	666	1316	54	13
M	Takaharu Furukawa	329	331	660	27	4
M	Junya Nakanishi	~~329~~	~~321~~	~~650~~	~~25~~	~~7~~
M	Fumiya Saito	~~323~~	~~322~~	~~645~~	~~18~~	~~5~~
W	Satsuki Noda	321	335	656	27	9
W	Tomomi Sugimoto	~~321~~	~~332~~	~~653~~	~~23~~	~~6~~
W	Azusa Yamauchi	~~311~~	~~316~~	~~627~~	~~14~~	~~4~~
7	Kazakhstan (KAZ)	658	650	1308	44	16
M	Ilfat Abdullin	334	329	663	25	10
M	Sultan Duzelbayev	~~321~~	~~319~~	~~640~~	~~16~~	~~7~~
M	Sanzhar Mussayev	~~313~~	~~319~~	~~632~~	~~22~~	~~11~~
M	Dauletkeldi Zhangbyrbay	~~325~~	~~329~~	~~654~~	~~26~~	~~10~~
W	Gaukhar Igibayeva	~~304~~	~~316~~	~~620~~	~~16~~	~~4~~
W	Alina Ilyassova	~~309~~	~~322~~	~~631~~	~~22~~	~~5~~
W	Alua Mukhtarkhanova	~~308~~	~~318~~	~~626~~	~~18~~	~~6~~
W	Medina Murat	324	321	645	19	6
8	Vietnam (VIE)	651	656	1307	41	18
M	Hoàng Văn Lộc	~~304~~	~~314~~	~~618~~	~~17~~	~~2~~
M	Lê Quốc Phong	~~322~~	~~328~~	~~650~~	~~24~~	~~10~~
M	Nguyễn Đạt Mạnh	~~317~~	~~322~~	~~639~~	~~16~~	~~8~~
M	Nguyễn Duy	332	328	660	24	8
W	Đỗ Thị Ánh Nguyệt	319	328	647	17	10
W	Hoàng Phương Thảo	~~316~~	~~319~~	~~635~~	~~22~~	~~5~~
W	Hoàng Thị Mai	~~309~~	~~324~~	~~633~~	~~19~~	~~8~~
W	Nguyễn Thị Thanh Nhi	~~309~~	~~332~~	~~641~~	~~24~~	~~6~~
9	Uzbekistan (UZB)	645	659	1304	58	18
M	Chen Yao Yuy	~~314~~	~~315~~	~~629~~	~~13~~	~~4~~
M	Mirjalol Mirolimov	~~306~~	~~309~~	~~615~~	~~12~~	~~2~~
M	Amirkhon Sadikov	337	335	672	36	13
M	Ozodbek Ungalov	~~305~~	~~296~~	~~601~~	~~15~~	~~7~~
W	Ziyodakhon Abdusattorova	308	324	632	22	5
W	Nilufar Hamroeva	~~309~~	~~319~~	~~628~~	~~20~~	~~6~~
W	Sabina Jurakulova	~~271~~	~~271~~	~~542~~	~~6~~	~~1~~
W	Bibihojar Yuldosheva	~~269~~	~~266~~	~~535~~	~~5~~	~~3~~
10	Iran (IRI)	644	651	1295	52	18
M	Sadegh Ashrafi	334	328	662	27	4
M	Mohammad Hossein Golshani	~~338~~	~~331~~	~~669~~	~~31~~	~~11~~
M	Reza Shabani	335	342	677	39	12
W	Mobina Fallah	309	309	618	13	6
W	Zahra Nemati	~~305~~	~~311~~	~~616~~	~~18~~	~~2~~
W	Yasna Pourmahani	~~309~~	~~308~~	~~617~~	~~16~~	~~7~~
11	Bangladesh (BAN)	639	655	1294	43	19
M	Sagor Islam	326	336	662	25	10
M	Hakim Ahmed Rubel	~~332~~	~~316~~	~~648~~	~~20~~	~~5~~
M	Ram Krishna Saha	~~330~~	~~323~~	~~653~~	~~26~~	~~8~~
M	Ruman Shana	~~319~~	~~329~~	~~648~~	~~21~~	~~8~~
W	Famida Sultana Nisha	~~275~~	~~287~~	~~562~~	~~9~~	~~3~~
W	Beauty Ray	~~272~~	~~289~~	~~561~~	~~9~~	~~2~~
W	Sima Aktar Shimu	~~310~~	~~321~~	~~631~~	~~12~~	~~5~~
W	Diya Siddique	313	319	632	18	9
12	Malaysia (MAS)	620	661	1281	48	6
M	Syafiq Busthamin	~~328~~	~~311~~	~~639~~	~~20~~	~~4~~
M	Khairul Anuar Mohamad	~~320~~	~~321~~	~~641~~	~~19~~	~~3~~
M	Danish Amsyar Norazlan	~~320~~	~~312~~	~~632~~	~~20~~	~~5~~
M	Zarif Syahir Zolkepeli	317	325	642	21	2
W	Ku Nurin Afiqah	~~311~~	~~315~~	~~626~~	~~20~~	~~6~~
W	Nur Ain Ayuni Fozi	~~288~~	~~297~~	~~585~~	~~9~~	~~3~~
W	Syaqiera Mashayikh	303	336	639	27	4
W	Nurul Izzah Mazlan	~~296~~	~~304~~	~~600~~	~~10~~	~~5~~
13	Mongolia (MGL)	638	640	1278	44	12
M	Batbayaryn Buyantüshig	~~317~~	~~314~~	~~631~~	~~15~~	~~2~~
M	Dorjsürengiin Dashnamjil	~~305~~	~~318~~	~~623~~	~~15~~	~~3~~
M	Jantsangiin Gantögs	~~323~~	~~314~~	~~637~~	~~19~~	~~6~~
M	Baatarkhuyagiin Otgonbold	328	334	662	30	6
W	Jargalsaikhany Dagiijanchiv	~~301~~	~~301~~	~~602~~	~~12~~	~~1~~
W	Altangereliin Enkhtuyaa	310	306	616	14	6
W	Ölziikhutagiin Khaliun	~~310~~	~~305~~	~~615~~	~~15~~	~~6~~
W	Bishindeegiin Urantungalag	~~300~~	~~296~~	~~596~~	~~10~~	~~4~~
14	Philippines (PHI)	633	639	1272	39	12
M	Jason Feliciano	334	332	666	28	10
M	Jonathan Reaport	~~319~~	~~326~~	~~645~~	~~17~~	~~7~~
W	Abby Bidaure	299	307	606	11	2
W	Pia Bidaure	~~271~~	~~295~~	~~566~~	~~12~~	~~5~~
15	Hong Kong (HKG)	643	623	1266	39	12
M	Kwok Yin Chai	329	322	651	24	7
M	Lucien Law	~~316~~	~~313~~	~~629~~	~~19~~	~~2~~
M	Leung Cheuk Yin	~~300~~	~~301~~	~~601~~	~~15~~	~~6~~
M	Wan Chun Kit	~~320~~	~~292~~	~~612~~	~~17~~	~~6~~
W	Cheng Yik Kiu	~~298~~	~~305~~	~~603~~	~~13~~	~~5~~
W	Ada Lam	~~292~~	~~291~~	~~583~~	~~11~~	~~5~~
W	Natalie Poon	314	301	615	15	5
W	Wang Cheuk Ying	~~287~~	~~303~~	~~590~~	~~10~~	~~1~~
16	Tajikistan (TJK)	630	632	1262	37	10
M	Abdumalik Ganiev	~~282~~	~~296~~	~~578~~	~~10~~	~~2~~
M	Robert Nam	332	323	655	26	6
M	Salimjon Salimov	~~274~~	~~284~~	~~558~~	~~5~~	~~2~~
W	Mavzuna Azimova	298	309	607	11	4
17	North Korea (PRK)	628	632	1260	36	10
M	Han Myong-gyu	~~307~~	~~308~~	~~615~~	~~16~~	~~4~~
M	Kim Kuk-song	~~307~~	~~308~~	~~615~~	~~16~~	~~4~~
M	Ri Tae-bom	314	323	637	19	4
W	Kang Un-ju	~~300~~	~~319~~	~~619~~	~~14~~	~~5~~
W	Pak Hyang-sun	314	309	623	17	6
W	Ri Song-bok	~~288~~	~~308~~	~~596~~	~~11~~	~~5~~
18	Thailand (THA)	629	622	1251	33	10
M	Phonthakorn Chaisilp	~~315~~	~~314~~	~~629~~	~~19~~	~~5~~
M	Tanapat Pathairat	315	321	636	19	5
M	Witthaya Thamwong	~~308~~	~~317~~	~~625~~	~~20~~	~~6~~
M	Denchai Thepna	~~287~~	~~296~~	~~583~~	~~8~~	~~3~~
W	Sataporn Artsalee	314	301	615	14	5
W	Punika Jongkraijak	~~293~~	~~316~~	~~609~~	~~15~~	~~6~~
W	Chunyaphak Kanjana	~~250~~	~~259~~	~~509~~	~~9~~	~~3~~
W	Narisara Khunhiranchaiyo	~~299~~	~~312~~	~~611~~	~~9~~	~~2~~
19	United Arab Emirates (UAE)	613	634	1247	38	8
M	Abdalla Al-Ketbi	313	316	629	21	5
W	Aisha Al-Ali	300	318	618	17	3
W	Hessa Al-Awadhi	~~262~~	~~276~~	~~538~~	~~9~~	~~0~~
20	Bhutan (BHU)	612	617	1229	29	10
M	Lam Dorji	329	315	644	18	5
W	Sonam Choden	~~264~~	~~287~~	~~551~~	~~10~~	~~3~~
W	Sonam Dema	283	302	585	11	5
21	Myanmar (MYA)	608	609	1217	32	9
M	Thiha Htet Zaw	322	317	639	19	8
W	Pyae Sone Hnin	286	292	578	13	1
22	Qatar (QAT)	594	606	1200	29	9
M	Hassan Al-Ashkanani	309	310	619	17	6
W	Haya Al-Hajri	285	296	581	12	3
23	Saudi Arabia (KSA)	599	595	1194	25	5
M	Hatim Al-Hatim	~~286~~	~~302~~	~~588~~	~~14~~	~~3~~
M	Abdulrahman Al-Musa	316	318	634	17	3
M	Rashed Al-Subaie	~~309~~	~~292~~	~~601~~	~~11~~	~~6~~
M	Mansour Alwi	~~315~~	~~313~~	~~628~~	~~18~~	~~2~~
W	Shaden Al-Marshud	~~279~~	~~280~~	~~559~~	~~14~~	~~2~~
W	Dalal Al-Mugairin	~~269~~	~~242~~	~~511~~	~~5~~	~~1~~
W	Aya Felemban	~~229~~	~~250~~	~~479~~	~~4~~	~~3~~
W	Sarah Saloum	283	277	560	8	2
24	Kuwait (KUW)	594	598	1192	24	4
M	Abdullah Al-Harbi	~~262~~	~~243~~	~~505~~	~~4~~	~~2~~
M	Ali Al-Zaid	308	302	610	14	3
M	Abdulla Taha	~~306~~	~~292~~	~~598~~	~~10~~	~~1~~
W	Soad Al-Bahar	~~278~~	~~253~~	~~531~~	~~7~~	~~3~~
W	Reem Al-Naqeeb	286	296	582	10	1
W	Noor Al-Sharhan	~~239~~	~~250~~	~~489~~	~~4~~	~~0~~
25	Nepal (NEP)	567	573	1140	19	1
M	Tilak Pun Magar	317	317	634	18	1
W	Manju Bajgain	250	256	506	1	0
26	Kyrgyzstan (KGZ)	566	570	1136	21	4
M	Ulukbek Kursanaliev	291	278	569	7	1
W	Diana Kanatbek Kyzy	275	292	567	14	3
27	Pakistan (PAK)	514	579	1093	25	7
M	Asrar-ul-Haq	312	322	634	19	6
M	Idrees Majeed	~~299~~	~~295~~	~~594~~	~~10~~	~~3~~
M	Muhammad Nadeem	~~297~~	~~299~~	~~596~~	~~9~~	~~3~~
W	Nighat Naheed	202	257	459	6	1

=== Knockout round ===
1/8 eliminations
1	South Korea	36	38	37	6
16	Tajikistan	31	36	33	0
9	Uzbekistan	34	37	34	28	2
8	Vietnam	37	35	37	35	6
5	India	38	37	39	38	6
12	Malaysia	39	36	33	36	2
13	Mongolia	25	36	34	1
4	Indonesia	36	36	36	5
3	Chinese Taipei	38	38	35	6
14	Philippines	33	36	33	0
11	Bangladesh	34	35	37	36	3
6	Japan	37	35	31	38	5
7	Kazakhstan	35	38	35	36	17	4
10	Iran	38	35	36	34	19	5
15	Hong Kong	38	35	36	34	3
2	China	38	36	35	35	5

Quarterfinals
1	South Korea	39	38	39	6
8	Vietnam	35	36	36	0
5	India	36	35	38	34	19	4
4	Indonesia	35	36	35	40	20	5
3	Chinese Taipei	32	37	37	36	15	4
6	Japan	38	34	36	38	17	5
10	Iran	39	35	39	6
2	China	38	29	33	0

Semifinals
1	South Korea	40	39	37	40	6
4	Indonesia	37	39	37	35	2
6	Japan	37	36	38	6
10	Iran	36	34	36	0

Gold medal match
1	South Korea	38	37	39	6
6	Japan	37	35	35	0
Bronze medal match
4	Indonesia	39	35	37	35	6
10	Iran	33	39	34	31	2
