= Archery at the 2021 Islamic Solidarity Games – Men's team recurve =

Men's team at the 2021 Islamic Solidarity Games
- Venue: Saraçoğlu Sport Complex
- Date: 14–17 August
- Competitors: 36 from 12 nations

Medalists
gold medal	Mete Gazoz; Samet Ak; Muhammed Yıldırmış	Turkey
silver medal	Arif Dwi Pangestu; Alviyanto Prastyadi; Riau Ega Agatha	Indonesia
bronze medal	Sagor Islam; Mohammad Hakim Rubel; Ruman Shana	Bangladesh

Archery at the 2021 Islamic Solidarity Games
Men	Recurve	Compound
Women	Recurve	Compound
Team	Men's recurve
Team	Women's recurve
Mixed team	Recurve

The men's team recurve competition in archery at the 2021 Islamic Solidarity Games was held from 15 to 17 August at the Saraçoğlu Sport Complex in Konya.

== Qualification round ==
Results after 216 arrows.

Rank	Nation	Name	Score	10+X	X
1	Turkey	Mete Gazoz; Samet Ak; Muhammed Yıldırmış	2023	106	41
2	Indonesia	Arif Dwi Pangestu; Alviyanto Prastyadi; Riau Ega Agatha	1981	85	29
3	Uzbekistan	Amirkhon Sadikov; Yao Yuy Chen; Ozodbek Ungalov	1941	54	19
4	Iran	Reza Shabani; Sadegh Ashrafi; Mohammadhossein Golshani Asl	1926	64	29
5	Bangladesh	Sagor Islam; Mohammad Hakim Rubel; Ruman Shana	1918	65	19
6	Saudi Arabia	Mansour Alwi; Abdulrahman Almusa; Rashed Alsubaie	1839	42	14
7	Malaysia	Muhammad Mohd Yusuf; Bryson Ting; Muhammad Rusmadi	1809	43	13
8	Kuwait	Abdullah Taha; Abdullah Alharbi; Faisel Alrashidi	1787	41	14
9	Azerbaijan	Mahammadali Aliyev; Zaur Gahramanov; Aleksey Kopnin	1739	40	14
10	United Arab Emirates	Abdalla Alketbi; Obaid Alhammadi; Sultan Alketbi	1726	26	8
11	Chad	Youssouf Ahmat Albechir; Bouyo Eiba; Israel Madaye	1614	26	6
12	Sudan	Mujahid Adam; Faisal Mohamed; Khalid Rashad	1250	9	1

== Elimination round ==
1/8 finals
9	Azerbaijan	6	50	47	54	49
8	Kuwait	2	48	50	40	47
5	Bangladesh	6	55	54	52
12	Sudan	0	38	35	40
11	Chad	0	43	32	39
6	Saudi Arabia	6	47	56	52
7	Malaysia	6	46	49	48
10	United Arab Emirates	0	42	44	37

Quarterfinals
1	Turkey	6	54	55	58
9	Azerbaijan	0	51	41	47
5	Bangladesh	5	52	50	55
4	Iran	1	52	49	54
3	Uzbekistan	1	53	50	55
6	Saudi Arabia	5	54	51	55
7	Malaysia	0	48	49	48
2	Indonesia	6	53	55	55

Semifinals
1	Turkey	6	53	58	54	56
5	Bangladesh	2	51	48	55	52
6	Saudi Arabia	2	51	55	58	56
2	Indonesia	6	5	53	55	50

Final
1	Turkey	6	55	58	54	57
2	Indonesia	2	52	54	56	54
Third place
5	Bangladesh	6	54	53	56
6	Saudi Arabia	0	50	50	51
