= Archery at the 2021 Islamic Solidarity Games – Men's individual compound =

Men's Individual Compound at the 2021 Islamic Solidarity Games
- Venue: Saraçoğlu Sport Complex
- Date: 14–18 August
- Competitors: 23 from 8 nations

Medalists
gold medal	Mohd Juwaidi Mazuki	Malaysia
silver medal	Mohammadsaleh Palizban	Iran
bronze medal	Emircan Haney	Turkey

Archery at the 2021 Islamic Solidarity Games
Men	Recurve	Compound
Women	Recurve	Compound
Team	Men's recurve
Team	Women's recurve
Mixed team	Recurve

The men's individual compound competition in archery at the 2021 Islamic Solidarity Games will held from 15 to 18 August at the Saraçoğlu Sport Complex in Konya.

== Qualification round ==
Results after 72 arrows.

Rank	Name	Nation	Score	10+X	X
1	Emircan Haney	Turkey	703	56	26
2	Hendika Putra Pratama	Indonesia	696	50	23
3	Mohd Juwaidi Mazuki	Malaysia	694	43	16
4	Amir Kazempour	Iran	693	47	20
5	Mohammadsaleh Palizban	Iran	690	46	14
6	Deki Adika Hastian	Indonesia	688	43	19
7	Egemen Uslu	Turkey	687	42	16
8	Prima Wisnu Wardhana	Indonesia	687	40	15
9	Serdar Bortay Maraş	Turkey	686	41	18
10	Mohammad Madandar	Iran	684	41	13
11	Mohammad Ashikuzaman	Bangladesh	682	42	15
12	Alang Ariff Aqil Ghazalli	Malaysia	678	34	16
13	Eugenius Loh Foh Soon	Malaysia	677	34	14
14	Md Sohel Rana	Bangladesh	676	34	16
15	Abdullah Malaallah	Kuwait	675	31	13
16	Abdulaziz Alrodhan	Saudi Arabia	672	35	13
17	Mithu Rahman	Bangladesh	665	29	13
18	Abdulaziz Alobaidi	Qatar	664	26	15
19	Muidh Albaqami	Saudi Arabia	654	39	15
20	Ahmed Alabadi	Qatar	650	20	4
21	Farhan Abdorabboh	Qatar	634	17	8
22	Bader Alshalahi	Kuwait	631	23	4
23	Ali AlShamrani	Saudi Arabia	630	16	9

== Final round ==
Semifinals
1	Haney (TUR)	148
5	Palizban (IRI)	149
7	Uslu (TUR)	146
3	Mazuki (MAS)	147

Finals
5	Palizban (IRI)	137
3	Mazuki (MAS)	148
Third place
4	Haney (TUR)	143
7	Uslu (TUR)	140

== Elimination round ==
Top half

Round of 32
Mithu Rahman (BAN)	140
Abdulaziz Alobaidi (KSA)	142
Farhan Abdorabboh (QAT)	137
Alang Ariff Ghazalli (MAS)	147
Ahmed Alabadi (QAT)	138
Eugenius Loh Foh Soon (MAS)	141

Round of 16
Emircan Haney (TUR)	149
Abdulaziz Alobaidi (KSA)	134
Serdar Bortay Maraş (TUR)	145^{9}
Prima Wisnu Wardhana (INA)	145^{9+}
Mohammadsaleh Palizban (IRI)	145
Alang Ariff Ghazalli (MAS)	144
Eugenius Loh Foh Soon (MAS)	144
Amir Kazempour (IRI)	143

Quarterfinals
Emircan Haney (TUR)	147
Prima Wisnu Wardhana (INA)	144
Mohammadsaleh Palizban (IRI)	145
Eugenius Loh Foh Soon (MAS)	143

Semifinals
Emircan Haney (TUR)	148
Mohammadsaleh Palizban (IRI)	149

Bottom half

Round of 32
Muidh Albaqami (KSA)	142
Md Sohel Rana (BAN)	139
Bader Alshalahi (KUW)	133
Mohammad Ashikuzaman (BAN)	143
Ali AlShamrani (KSA)	132
Mohammad Madandar (IRI)	139
Abdullah Malaallah (KUW)	138
Abdulaziz Alobaidi (QAT)	133

Round of 16
Mohd Juwaidi Mazuki (MAS)	144
Muidh Albaqami (KSA)	135
Mohammad Ashikuzaman (BAN)	146
Deki Adika Hastian (INA)	143
Egemen Uslu (TUR)	143
Mohammad Madandar (IRI)	140
Abdullah Malaallah (KUW)	142
Hendika Putra Pratama (INA)	141

Quarterfinals
Mohd Juwaidi Mazuki (MAS)	150
Mohammad Ashikuzaman (BAN)	134
Egemen Uslu (TUR)	142
Abdullah Malaallah (KUW)	140

Semifinals
Mohd Juwaidi Mazuki (MAS)	147
Egemen Uslu (TUR)	146
