= Archery at the 2021 Islamic Solidarity Games – Women's team recurve =

Women's team at the 2021 Islamic Solidarity Games
- Venue: Saraçoğlu Sport Complex
- Date: 14–17 August
- Competitors: 33 from 11 nations

Medalists
gold medal	Yasemin Anagöz; Gülnaz Büşranur Coşkun; Aslı Er	Turkey
silver medal	Rezza Octavia; Asiefa Nur Haenza; Pande Putu Arista	Indonesia
bronze medal	Diya Siddique; Akter Nasrin; Beauty Ray	Bangladesh

Archery at the 2021 Islamic Solidarity Games
Men	Recurve	Compound
Women	Recurve	Compound
Team	Men's recurve
Team	Women's recurve
Mixed team	Recurve

The women's team recurve competition in archery at the 2021 Islamic Solidarity Games was held from 15 to 17 August at the Saraçoğlu Sport Complex in Konya.

== Qualification round ==
Results after 216 arrows.

Rank	Nation	Name	Score	10+X	X
1	Turkey	Yasemin Anagöz; Gülnaz Büşranur Coşkun; Aslı Er	1878	51	11
2	Indonesia	Rezza Octavia; Asiefa Nur Haenza; Pande Putu Arista	1806	46	10
3	Bangladesh	Diya Siddique; Akter Nasrin; Beauty Ray	1766	33	12
4	Uzbekistan	Abdusattorova Ziyodakhon; Nilufar Hamroeva; Zebiniso Abdusattorova	1738	33	7
5	Azerbaijan	Svetlana Simonova; Yaylagul Ramazanova; Nazrin Zamanova	1729	39	13
6	Malaysia	Nurul Fazil; Rohani Tengku; Nur Ain Ayuni Fozi	1694	27	8
7	Kyrgyzstan	Diana Kanatbek Kyzy; Jibek Kanatbek Kyzy; Aiturgan Mamatkulova	1642	20	6
8	Pakistan	Abdullah Taha; Abdullah Alharbi; Faisel Alrashidi	1584	20	4
9	United Arab Emirates	Fatima Alblooshi; Maha Al Hosani; Aisha Al-Ali	1541	15	3
10	Chad	Alphonsine Foulkouma; Hallas Maria Abaifouta; Salome Atchoumngaye	1198	6	1
11	Yemen	Sahar Almahjari; Hend Abdullah Hamood; Rehab Al-Sayaghi	360	1	0

== Elimination round ==
1/8 finals
9	United Arab Emirates	0	42	43	45
8	Pakistan	6	47	52	51
11	Yemen
6	Malaysia	w/o
7	Kyrgyzstan	6	48	48	40
10	Chad	0	36	37	28

Quarterfinals
1	Turkey	5	52	55	55
8	Pakistan	1	52	38	50
5	Azerbaijan	2	47	43	40	44
4	Uzbekistan	5	43	51	51	51
3	Bangladesh	6	51	51	52
6	Malaysia	0	50	45	45
7	Kyrgyzstan	2	41	50	42	47
2	Indonesia	6	48	47	49	54

Semifinals
1	Turkey	6	52	55	55
4	Uzbekistan	0	45	50	49
3	Bangladesh	4	55	46	51	50	23
2	Indonesia	5	49	49	46	53	23+

Final
1	Turkey	6	49	52	52
2	Indonesia	0	46	49	49
Third place
4	Uzbekistan	2	48	51	53	46
3	Bangladesh	6	52	52	45	47
