= Archery at the 2021 Islamic Solidarity Games – Women's individual compound =

Women's Individual Compound at the 2021 Islamic Solidarity Games
- Venue: Saraçoğlu Sport Complex
- Date: 14–18 August
- Competitors: 10 from 6 nations

Medalists
gold medal	Geesa Bybordy	Iran
silver medal	Yeşim Bostan	Turkey
bronze medal	Ayşe Bera Süzer	Turkey

Archery at the 2021 Islamic Solidarity Games
Men	Recurve	Compound
Women	Recurve	Compound
Team	Men's recurve
Team	Women's recurve
Mixed team	Recurve

The women's individual compound competition in archery at the 2021 Islamic Solidarity Games was held from 15 to 18 August at the Saraçoğlu Sport Complex in Konya.

== Qualification round ==
Results after 72 arrows.

Rank	Name	Nation	Score	10+X	X
1	Yeşim Bostan	Turkey	693	47	19
2	Ayşe Bera Süzer	Turkey	691	46	14
3	Geesa Bybordy	Iran	687	40	10
4	Sevim Yıldır	Turkey	684	44	13
5	Roksana Akter	Bangladesh	682	41	13
6	Shamoli Ray	Bangladesh	680	38	13
7	Ratih Zilizati Fadhly	Indonesia	673	28	9
8	Puspita Zaman	Bangladesh	672	30	11
9	Nur Aina Yasmine Halim	Malaysia	668	29	11
10	Maram Yaser Noman	Yemen	633	18	3

== Elimination round ==
1/8 finals
Nur Aina Yasmine Halim (MAS)	139
Puspita Zaman (BAN)	138
Ratih Zilizati Fadhly (INA)	135
Maram Yaser Noman (YEM)	118

Quarterfinals
Yeşim Bostan (TUR)	146
Nur Aina Yasmine Halim (MAS)	143
Roksana Akter (BAN)	144
Sevim Yıldır (TUR)	140
Geesa Bybordy (IRI)	144
Shamoli Ray (BAN)	143
Ratih Zilizati Fadhly (INA)	138
Ayşe Bera Süzer (TUR)	147

Semifinals
Yeşim Bostan (TUR)	148
Roksana Akter (BAN)	146
Geesa Bybordy (IRI)	144
Ayşe Bera Süzer (TUR)	140

Final
Yeşim Bostan (TUR)	142
Geesa Bybordy (IRI)	146

Bronze medal
Ayşe Bera Süzer (TUR)	136
Roksana Akter (BAN)	133
