= Cycling at the 2021 Islamic Solidarity Games =

Cycling competition

- Venue: Konya Velodrome
- Dates: 5–13 August 2022
- Competitors: 122 from 18 nations

Cycling at the 2021 Islamic Solidarity Games was held in Konya, Turkey from 5 to 13 August 2022 in Konya Velodrome. The Road Cycling events of the competitions were held on various routes in Konya and the Track Cycling events were held at the Konya Velodrome.

The Games were originally scheduled to take place from 20 to 29 August 2021 in Konya, Turkey. In May 2020, the Islamic Solidarity Sports Federation (ISSF), who are responsible for the direction and control of the Islamic Solidarity Games, postponed the games as the 2020 Summer Olympics were postponed to July and August 2021, due to the global COVID-19 pandemic.

== Medalists ==
=== Road ===
==== Men ====
Event	Gold	Silver	Bronze
Road race	Mohammad Ganjkhanloo; Iran	Youcef Reguigui; Algeria	Yousif Mirza; United Arab Emirates
Individual time trial	Ahmed Madan; Bahrain	Saied Jafer Al-Ali; Kuwait	Aleksey Fomovskiy; Uzbekistan

==== Women ====
Event	Gold	Silver	Bronze
Road race	Olga Zabelinskaya; Uzbekistan	Margarita Misyurina; Uzbekistan	Mandana Dehghan; Iran
Individual time trial	Olga Zabelinskaya; Uzbekistan	Yanina Kuskova; Uzbekistan	Rinata Sultanova; Kazakhstan

=== Track ===
==== Men ====
Event	Gold	Silver	Bronze
Individual pursuit	Alisher Zhumakan; Kazakhstan	Dmitriy Moskov; Kazakhstan	Aleksey Fomovskiy; Uzbekistan
Points race	Yousif Mirza; United Arab Emirates	Behnam Arian; Iran	Ahmed Al-Mansoori; United Arab Emirates
Scratch	Ahmed Al-Mansoori; United Arab Emirates	Behnam Arian; Iran	Alisher Zhumakan; Kazakhstan
Omnium	Artyom Zakharov; Kazakhstan	Ahmed Al-Mansoori; United Arab Emirates	Aleksey Fomovskiy; Uzbekistan

==== Women ====
Event	Gold	Silver	Bronze
Individual pursuit	Rinata Sultanova; Kazakhstan	Yanina Kuskova; Uzbekistan	Marina Kuzmina; Kazakhstan
Points race	Olga Zabelinskaya; Uzbekistan	Yanina Kuskova; Uzbekistan	Svetlana Pachshenko; Kazakhstan
Scratch	Rinata Sultanova; Kazakhstan	Nur Aisyah Zubir; Malaysia	Sofiya Karimova; Uzbekistan
Omnium	Rinata Sultanova; Kazakhstan	Ayustina Delia Priatna; Indonesia	Nur Aisyah Zubir; Malaysia

== Medal table ==
Rank	Nation	Gold	Silver	Bronze	Total
1	Kazakhstan (KAZ)	5	1	4	10
2	Uzbekistan (UZB)	3	4	4	11
3	United Arab Emirates (UAE)	2	1	2	5
4	Iran (IRI)	1	2	1	4
5	Bahrain (BRN)	1	0	0	1
6	Malaysia (MAS)	0	1	1	2
7	Algeria (ALG)	0	1	0	1
7	Indonesia (INA)	0	1	0	1
7	Kuwait (KUW)	0	1	0	1
Totals (9 entries)		12	12	12	36

== Participating nations ==
A total of 122 athletes from 18 nations competed in cycling at the 2021 Islamic Solidarity Games:

- Afghanistan (4)
- Albania (2)
- Algeria (11)
- Azerbaijan (10)
- Bahrain (3)
- Indonesia (4)
- Iran (8)
- Kazakhstan (10)
- Kuwait (4)
- Malaysia (6)
- Mauritania (3)
- Morocco (6)
- Oman (5)
- Qatar (5)
- Turkey (13)
- Uganda (2)
- United Arab Emirates (9)
- Uzbekistan (17)
