= Bangladesh at the Islamic Solidarity Games =

- IOC code: BAN
- NOC: Bangladesh Olympic Association
- Medals Ranked 33rd: Gold 1 Silver 4 Bronze 8 Total 13

Islamic Solidarity Games appearances (overview)
- 2005; 2013; 2017; 2021; 2025

Bangladesh has competed at every celebration of the Islamic Solidarity Games. Its athletes have won a total of 13 medals (1 gold, 4 silver, and 8 bronze). Most medals won in a single tournament was in 2025 Islamic Solidarity Games and 2021 Islamic Solidarity Games with 3 combined medals, and most gold medals in an Edition was 1 gold medal in the 2017 Islamic Solidarity Games.

== Medal tables ==
=== Medals by Islamic Solidarity Games ===
Host nation

Below the table representing all Bangladesh medals in the games. Till now, Bangladesh has won 8 medals (1 gold, 3 silver, and 4 bronze).

Games	Athletes	Gold	Silver	Bronze	Total	Rank	Notes	RF
(Saudi Arabia) 2005 Mecca		0	0	0	0	—	details	
(Iran) 2010 Tehran	Canceled							
(Indonesia) 2013 Palembang		0	1	1	2	20	details	
(Azerbaijan) 2017 Baku		1	1	1	3	21	details	
(Turkey) 2021 Konya		0	1	2	3	33	details	
(Saudi Arabia) 2025 Riyadh	33	0	1	4	5	32	details	
Total		1	4	8	13	33	-	-

== See also ==
- Bangladesh at the Olympics
- Bangladesh at the Paralympics
- Bangladesh at the Asian Games
- Bangladesh at the Commonwealth Games
- Sports in Bangladesh
