= Yasemin Anagöz =

Turkish archer (born 1998)

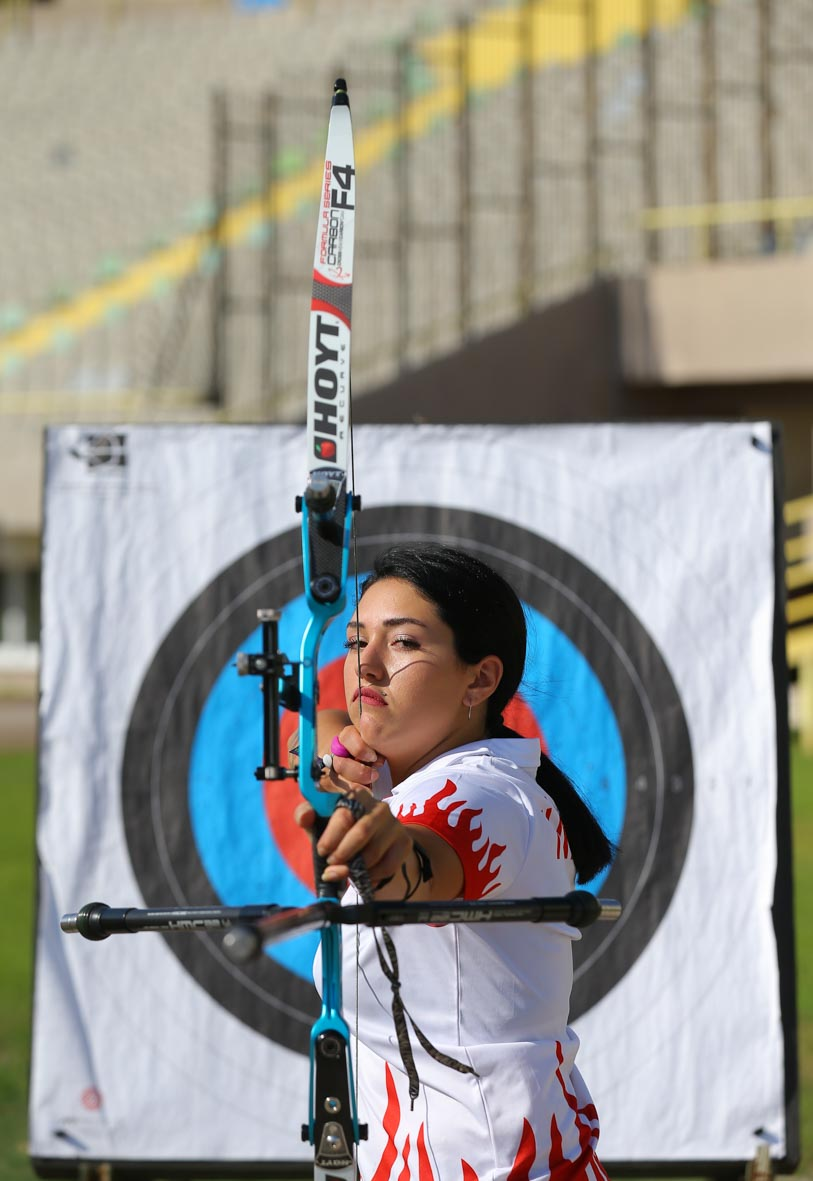

Personal information
- Full name: Yasemin Ecem Anagöz
- Born: 14 October 1998 (age 27)
- Height: 165 cm (5 ft 5 in)
- Weight: 70 kg (154 lb)

Sport
- Country: Turkey
- Sport: Archery
- Event: recurve
- Coached by: Göktug Ergin
Medal record
Event	1st	2nd	3rd
World Championships	0	0	1
World Cup	0	4	3
European Championships	2	0	0
Mediterranean Games	2	0	1
World Youth Championships	0	0	1
Total	4	4	6
Archery Recurve
Representing Turkey
World Championship
Bronze medal – third place	2021 Yankton	Mixed team
European Championships
Gold medal – first place	2018 Legnica	Women
Gold medal – first place	2018 Legnica	Women team
Silver medal – second place	2022 Munich	Women team
World Cup
Silver medal – second place	2019 Shanghai	Mixed team
Bronze medal – third place	2019 Antalya	Mixed team
Silver medal – second place	2018 Samsun	Recurve women
Silver medal – second place	2018 Shanghai	Mixed team
Bronze medal – third place	2018 Antalya	Mixed team
Bronze medal – third place	2018 Berlin	Mixed team
Silver medal – second place	2018 Samsun	Mixed team
Islamic Solidarity Games
Gold medal – first place	2021 Konya	Individual
Gold medal – first place	2021 Konya	Team
Silver medal – second place	2021 Konya	Mixed team
Mediterranean Games
Gold medal – first place	2022 Oran	Team
Gold medal – first place	2022 Oran	Mixed team
Bronze medal – third place	2018 Tarragona	Women team
World Youth Championships
Bronze medal – third place	2017 Rosario	Junior mixed team

Yasemin Ecem Anagöz (born 14 October 1998) is a Turkish recurve archer.

Anagöz represented her country at the 2015 European Games in Baku, Azerbaijan. She competed in the individual recurve event and the team recurve event at the 2015 World Archery Championships in Copenhagen, Denmark.

She won the bronze medal in the junior mixed team event with her teammate Mete Gazoz at the 2017 World Archery Youth Championships in Rosario, Santa Fe, Argentina. In 2018, she won the European Championships in Legnica, beating Denmark's Maja Jager in the final, and added another gold in the women's team event.

She won the silver medal in the women's team recurve event at the 2022 European Archery Championships held in Munich, Germany.
