= Pakistan at the 2021 Islamic Solidarity Games =

- IOC code: PAK
- NOC: National Olympic Committee of Pakistan

in Konya, Turkey
- Competitors: 79
- Flag bearers: Nooh Dastgir Butt
- Medals: Gold 1 Silver 0 Bronze 1 Total 2

Islamic Solidarity Games appearances (overview)
- 2005; 2013; 2017; 2021; 2025

Pakistan participated in the 2021 Islamic Solidarity Games held in Konya, Turkey from 9 to 18 August 2022.

The games had been rescheduled several times. In May 2021, the ISSF postponed the event to August 2022 citing the COVID-19 pandemic situation in the participating countries. Pakistan secured two medals at the Games. Arshad Nadeem grabbed the gold in javelin with a Games-record throw of 88.55 metres. The other medal was a bronze by para table tennis athlete Altaf-ur-Rehman.

== Athletes and Officials ==
A total of 114 athletes and officials were sent to participate in these Games. Archery, athletics, fencing, gymnastics, judo, shooting, swimming, table tennis, taekwondo, volleyball, weightlifting and wrestling are some of the sports being competed in. Ahmad Hanif Orakzai was the Chef de Mission for the Pakistani team in Konya.

Sport	Men	Women	Total
Archery	2	3	5
Athletics	7	1	8
Para Athletics	1		1
Fencing	1		1
Gymnastics	3		3
Judo			
Karate	4	3	7
Shooting	6		6
Swimming			6
Table Tennis	2	2	4
Para Table Tennis	1		1
Taekwondo	7	4	11
Volleyball			
Weightlifting	3		3
Wrestling	6		6
Total	43	13	56

== Medalists ==
Medals by sport
Sport	1st place, gold medalist(s)	2nd place, silver medalist(s)	3rd place, bronze medalist(s)	Total
Archery	0	0	0	0
Athletics	1	0	0	1
Bocce	0	0	0	0
Gymnastics	0	0	0	0
Karate	0	0	0	0
Swimming	0	0	0	0
Taekwondo	0	0	0	0
Volleyball	0	0	0	0
Weightlifting	0	0	0	0
Wrestling	0	0	0	0
Table tennis	0	0	0	0
Para Table tennis	0	0	1	1
Total	1	0	1	2

Medal	Name	Sport	Event
Gold	Arshad Nadeem	Athletics	Javelin throw
Bronze	Altaf-Ur-Rehman	Para table tennis	Men's team Class 4

== Archery ==
Pakistan has sent a team of five athletes, two men and three women:

- Abdur Rehman Hafiz
- Muhammad Noman Saqib
- Umme Kulsoom
- Sadia Mai
- Kiran Muhammad

Recurve

Athlete	Event	Ranking Round		Round of 64	Round of 32	Round of 16	Quarterfinals	Semifinals	Final/Bronze medal	
Athlete	Event	Score	Seed	Opposition Score	Opposition Score	Opposition Score	Opposition Score	Opposition Score	Opposition Score	Rank
Muhammad Noman Saqib	Men's Individual	585	32	Kulchoro Nurmanbetov (KGZ)W 6 - 0	Mete Gazoz (TUR)L 0 - 6	Did not advance				
Abdur Rehman Hafiz	Men's Individual	572	36	Abdullah Alharbi (KUW) L 5 - 6	Did not advance					
Umme Kulsoom	Women's Individual	560	17	Bye	Diana Kanatbek Kyzy (KGZ) L 4 - 6	Did not advance				
Sadia Mai	Women's Individual	492	33	Aisha Al-Ali (UAE) W 7 - 3	Yasemin Anagöz (TUR)L 0 - 6	Did not advance				
Kiran Muhammad	Women's Individual	532	23	Bye	Aslı Er (TUR)L 4 - 6	Did not advance				
Umme KulsoomSadia MaiKiran Muhammad	Women's Team	1584	8	United Arab Emirates (UAE)W 6 - 0	Turkey (TUR) L 1 - 5	Did not advance				
Muhammad Noman Saqib Umme Kulsoom	Mixed team	1145	12	Bangladesh (BAN) L 3 - 5	Did not advance					

== Athletics ==
Men
Track and road events

Athlete	Event	Round 1		Semifinal		Final	
Athlete	Event	Result	Rank	Result	Rank	Result	Rank
Shajar Abbas	Men's 100m	10.25	15 Q	10.38	15		
Shajar Abbas	Men's 200m	20.68	5				
Abdul Mueed	Men's 200m	21.28	21				
Abdul Mueed	Men's 400m	47.25	11				

Field Events

Athlete	Event	Final	
Athlete	Event	Distance	Rank
Jamshad Ali	Men's Shotput	16.65m	10
Arshad Nadeem	Men's Javelin Throw	88.55m	1st place, gold medalist(s)
Sharoz Khan	Men's High Jump	2.14m	4

Women
Track and road events

Athlete	Event	Round 1		Semifinal		Final	
Athlete	Event	Result	Rank	Result	Rank	Result	Rank
Urooj Kiran	100 m	11.24	6				

Para-Athletics

Athlete	Event	Final	
Athlete	Event	Distance	Rank
Naeem Masih	Men's High Jump T46	NM	-

== Fencing ==
Pakistan has sent a single fencer, The sole Pakistani fencer was eliminated in the first round of the Men's Epee event.

- Mujaded Awan

== Gymnastics ==
Pakistan has fielded a team of 3 male gymnasts;

- Muhammad Afzal
- Shah Jahan Barkat
- Muhammad Sohail

== Judo ==
The team consists of three male judokas;

- Qaiser Khan
- Haseeb Mustafa
- Shah Hussain Shah

== Karate ==
The contingent consists of six athletes, 4 men and 2 women;

- Saadi Ghulam Abbas
- Naseer Ahmed
- Imran Ali
- Murad Khan
- Sana Kousar
- Fakhar-un-Nisa

== Swimming ==
Pakistan has sent a team of six swimmers;

- Mishael Aisha Hayat Ayub
- Bisma Khan
- Fatima Adnan Lotia
- Daniyal Ghulam Nabi
- Jehanara Nabi
- Muhammad Amaan Siddiqui

Results

Athlete	Event	Heats		Semi-Final		Final	
Athlete	Event	Time	Rank	Time	Rank	Time	Rank
Muhammad Amaan Siddiqui	Men's 100m backstroke	55.19	23	Did not advance			
Muhammad Amaan Siddiqui	Men's 400m freestyle			4:19.05	8 Q	4:20.66	8
Muhammad Amaan Siddiqui	Men's 800m freestyle					9:00.45	6
Muhammad Amaan Siddiqui	Men's 200m freestyle	2:02.10	16	Did not advance			
Muhammad Amaan Siddiqui	Men's 400m individual medley	5:03.42	9	Did not advance			
Daniyal Ghulam Nabi	Men's 50m breaststroke	31.28	18	Did not advance			
Daniyal Ghulam Nabi	Men's 100m breaststroke	1:10.30	16 Q	1:10.45	16	Did not advance	
Daniyal Ghulam Nabi	Men's 200m breaststroke	DSQ		Did not advance			
Bisma Khan	Women's 50m freestyle	28.24	11 Q	28.39	9	Did not advance	
Bisma Khan	Women's 50m butterfly			29.63	10	Did not advance	
Bisma Khan	Women's 100m butterfly			1:09.38	5 Q	1:11.61	8
Bisma Khan	Women's 100m freestyle	1:03.19	12 Q	1:02.59	8 Q	1:03.03	8
Fatima Adnan Lotia	Women's 50m backstroke			35.43	13	Did not advance	
Fatima Adnan Lotia	Women's 100m backstroke	41.67	8 Q	Bye		1:19.08	8
Fatima Adnan Lotia	Women's 200m backstroke					2:49.56	7
Jehanara Nabi	Women's 100m freestyle	1:02.47	11 Q	1:02.11	7 Q	1:02.06	6
Jehanara Nabi	Women's 200m freestyle			2:15.08	8 Q	2:14.05	8
Jehanara Nabi	Women's 400m freestyle	4:42.44	6 Q			4:47.61	7
Jehanara Nabi	Women's 800m freestyle					9:39.65	5
Mishael Aisha Hayat Ayub	Women's 50m breaststroke	36.83	9	Did not advance			
Mishael Aisha Hayat Ayub	Women's 100m breaststroke			1:24.12	8 Q	1:21.22	7
Mishael Aisha Hayat Ayub	Women's 200m breaststroke					3:00.13	5
Mishael Aisha Hayat Ayub Bisma Khan Fatima Adnan Lotia Jehanara Nabi	Women's 4 x 200m freestyle relay					10:07.58	5
Mishael Aisha Hayat Ayub Bisma Khan Fatima Adnan Lotia Jehanara Nabi	Women's 4 x 100m medley relay					4:55.09	6
Mishael Aisha Hayat Ayub Bisma Khan Fatima Adnan Lotia Jehanara Nabi	Women's 4 x 100m freestyle relay	—N/a				4:29.45	5

== Shooting ==
Pakistan has sent a team of six male shooters;

- Usman Chand
- Zafar Ul Haq
- Khurram Inam
- Asif Mehmood
- Muhammad Farrukh Nadeem
- Amin Ullah

Athlete	Event	Qualification	
Athlete	Event	Score	Rank
Muhammad Farrukh Nadeem	Men's Trap	70	14
Zafar-ul-Haq	Men's Trap	65	28
Aminullah	Men's Trap	63	31
Usman Chand	Men's Skeet	116	16
Khurram Inam	Men's Skeet	115	20
Asif Mehmood	Men's Skeet	113	22

== Table Tennis ==
Athletes	Event	Round of 16	Quarterfinal	Semifinal	Final / BM	
Athletes	Event	Opposition Score	Opposition Score	Opposition Score	Opposition Score	Rank
Hoor Fawad	Women's singles	(Turkey) Ozge Yılmaz L 1-3	Did not advance			
Haiqa Hassan	Women's singles	(Bangladesh) Sadia Rehman Mou W 3-2				
Fahad Khwaja	Men's singles	(Kyrgyzstan) Azamat Ergeshov L 0-3				
Muhammad Taimur Khan	Men's singles	(Lebanon) El Habach Saadeddine L 0-3				
Altaf ur Rehman	Men's singles Class 4	(Algeria) Kahli Boutelis W 3 - 0				3rd place, bronze medalist(s)

== Taekwondo ==
Pakistan has sent a team of eleven athletes, seven men and four women;

- Mazhar Abbas
- Wajid Ali
- Naqsh Hamdani
- Muhammad Iqbal
- Haroon Khan
- Muhammad Arbaz Khan
- Hamzah Omar Saeed
- Fateemah Tuz Zahraa Khawar
- Noor Rehman
- Sara Rehman
- Zoya Sabir

Athlete	Event	Round of 32	Round of 16	Quarterfinal	SemifInal	Repechage	Final	
Athlete	Event	Opposition Result	Opposition Result	Opposition Result	Opposition Result	Opposition Result	Result	Rank
Haroon Khan	Men's 58kg	Bye	(Qatar) Abdulqader Asfoor					
Mazhar Abbas	Men's 80kg	Bye	(Cameroon) Mbaiguinam Kalvin					
Hamzah Omar Saeed	Men's +87kg	Bye	(Afghanistan) Ali Akbar Amiri					
Fateemah Tuz Zahraa Khawar	Women's 49kg			(Iran) Ghazal Soltani L				
Naqsh Hamdani	Women's 53kg	Bye	(Cameroon) Bidzono Francine					
Noor Rehman	Women's 57kg			(Lebanon) Laetita Aoun L				

== Volleyball ==
=== Men's tournament ===
Team Roster

No	Name	Position
1	Muhammad Hamad	Wing-Spiker
3	Usman Faryad Ali	Wing-Spiker
7	Mubashar Raza	Wing-Spiker
8	Aimal Khan	Opposite
9	Mustafa Ahmad Khan	Wing-Spiker
11	Murad Khan	Opposite
12	Bilal Khan	Libero
13	Muhammad Kashif Naveed	Setter
14	Abdul Zaheer	Middle Blocker
16	Afaq Khan	Wing-Spiker
17	Hamid Yazman	Setter
18	Musawer Khan	Middle Blocker
19	Nasir Ali	Middle Blocker

Officials
No	Name	Position
1	Cristiano Rodrigues Campos	Coach
2	Khalid Waqar	Coach
3	Ahmed Saeed Kazi	Manager

Pool B

Pos	Team	Pld	W	L	Pts	SW	SL	SR	SPW	SPL	SPR	Qualification
1	Iran	1	1	0	3	3	0	MAX	76	62	1.226	Semifinals
2	Turkey (H)	1	1	0	3	3	1	3.000	112	108	1.037	Semifinals
3	Pakistan	1	0	1	0	1	3	0.333	108	112	0.964	
4	Qatar	1	0	1	1	0	3	0.000	62	76	0.816	

(H) Host

Date	Time		Score		Set 1	Set 2	Set 3	Set 4	Set 5	Total	Report
9 Aug	19:00	Pakistan	1–3	Turkey	28–30	26–24	27–29	27–29		108–112	
11 Aug	10:00	Pakistan	0–3	Iran	18–25	26–28	18–25			62–78	
13 Aug	13:00	Pakistan	2–3	Qatar	25–21	25–13	31–33	23–25	8–15	112–107	

== Weightlifting ==
Three weightlifters will represent Pakistan:

- Muhammad Nooh Dastgir Butt
- Hanzala Dastgir Butt
- Haider Ali

Results
Athlete	Event	Snatch		Clean & jerk		Total	Rank
Athlete	Event	Result	Rank	Result	Rank	Total	Rank
Haider Ali	Men's -81kg	135	10	160	12	295	12
Hanzala Dastgir Butt	Men's -109kg	146	6	183	6	329	6
Muhammad Nooh Dastgir Butt	Men's +109kg	162	4	216	4	378	4

== Wrestling ==
Muhammad Inam withdrew from the Games after sustaining a knee injury during the Commonwealth Games held in July/August 2022 in Birmingham, UK. The wrestling team consists of:

- Muhammad Bilal
- Haider Ali Butt
- Muhammad Asad Butt
- Inayat Ullah

Key:

- F – Victory by fall.
- PP – Decision by points – the loser with technical points.
- PO – Decision by points – the loser without technical points.
- ST – Great superiority – the loser without technical points and a margin of victory of at least 8 (Greco-Roman) or 10 (freestyle) points.

Freestyle

Athlete	Event	Quarterfinal	Semifinal	Repechage 1	Repechage 2	Final / BM	
Athlete	Event	Opposition Result	Opposition Result	Opposition Result	Opposition Result	Opposition Result	Rank
Haider Ali Butt	Men's 97kg	Magomed Ibragimov (UZB)L 0 - 10	Did not advance				
Muhammad Asad Butt	Men's 79kg	Youssef Ait-Boulahri (MAR)L 0 - 10	Did not advance				
Inayat Ullah	Men's 70kg	Islam Dudaev (ALB)L 0 - 10	Did not advance				
Muhammad Bilal	Men's 61kg	Islam Bazarganov (AZE) L 0 - 3	Did not advance		(Afghanistan) Sayed Naseri W 11 - 0	(Iran) Majid Dastan L 3 - 6	5
