= Amdivie Kouhounha =

Beninese gymnast

- Born: 9 February 2001 (age 25) Godomey, Benin
- Height: 1m 54cm

Gymnastics career
- Discipline: Aerobic gymnastics
- Country represented: Benin
Medal record
Women's aerobic gymnastics
Representing Benin
Islamic Solidarity Games
| Bronze medal – third place | 2021 Konya | Individual |

Amdivie Tona Kouhounha (born 9 February 2001) is a Beninese aerobic gymnast. She has won a bronze medal at the Islamic Solidarity Games.

== Career ==
Kouhounha was born in Godomey, Benin, and was educated at the National Institute of Youth, Physical Education and Sport (INJEPS). She has practiced gymnastics since she was aged 11.

Kouhounha won a double bronze medal in aerobic gymnastics at the 2018 African Youth Games in Algiers, Algeria and a double gold medal and a silver medal in the junior category at the 2018 Aerobic Gymnastics African Championships in Brazzaville, Republic of the Congo.

Kouhounha moved up to the senior level gymnastic competitions in 2019. She won a silver medal in the team event and a bronze medal in the mixed trio event at the 2020 Aerobic Gymnastics African Championships in Sharm el-Sheikh, Egypt.

Kouhounha won a bronze medal in the women's individual event at the 2021 Islamic Solidarity Games in Konya, Turkey.

Kouhonha won a silver medal in the mixed trio and a bronze medal in the mixed duet at the 2022 Aerobic Gymnastics African Championships in Cairo, Egypt.

Kouhonha won the parkour event at the Beninese Gymnastics Federation's championships in 2023.
