= Archery at the 2021 Islamic Solidarity Games – Women's individual recurve =

Women's individual at the 2021 Islamic Solidarity Games
- Venue: Saraçoğlu Sport Complex
- Date: 14–18 August 2021
- Competitors: 40 from 16 nations

Medalists
gold medal	Yasemin Anagöz	Turkey
silver medal	Gülnaz Büşranur Coşkun	Turkey
bronze medal	Rezza Octavia	Indonesia

The Women's Individual Recurve competition in archery at the 2021 Islamic Solidarity Games was held from 14 to 18 August 2021 at the Saraçoğlu Sport Complex in Konya.

== Qualification round ==
Results after 72 arrows.

Rank	Name	Nation	Score	10+X	X
1	Yasemin Anagöz	Turkey	645	21	6
2	Gülnaz Büşranur Coşkun	Turkey	633	20	3
3	Mahta Abdollahi	Iran	631	13	7
4	Rezza Octavia	Indonesia	627	18	4
5	Abdusattorova Ziyodakhon	Uzbekistan	623	17	3
6	Nurul Fazil	Malaysia	610	14	4
7	Asiefa Nur Haenza	Indonesia	603	18	4
8	Nilufar Hamroeva	Uzbekistan	602	12	3
9	Diya Siddique	Bangladesh	602	9	3
10	Aslı Er	Turkey	600	10	2
11	Svetlana Simonova	Azerbaijan	595	14	6
12	Yaylagul Ramazanova	Azerbaijan	592	13	4
13	Akter Nasrin	Bangladesh	583	10	4
14	Beauty Ray	Bangladesh	581	14	5
15	Pande Putu Arista	Indonesia	576	10	2
16	Diana Kanatbek Kyzy	Kyrgyzstan	561	8	2
17	Umme Kalsoom	Pakistan	560	10	1
18	Rohani Tengku	Malaysia	553	6	2
19	Jibek Kanatbek Kyzy	Kyrgyzstan	551	6	3
20	Nazrin Zamanova	Azerbaijan	542	12	3
21	Firuza Zubaydova	Tajikistan	537	2	0
22	Dilnoza Ahmadova	Tajikistan	534	4	1
23	Kiran Muhammad	Pakistan	532	5	2
24	Nur Ain Ayuni Fozi	Malaysia	531	7	2
25	Aiturgan Mamatkulova	Kyrgyzstan	530	6	1
26	Fatima Alblooshi	United Arab Emirates	527	6	3
27	Haya Al-Hajri	Qatar	526	11	5
28	Amena Aljarman	Qatar	523	5	1
29	Fatoumata Sylla	Guinea	522	4	0
30	Maha Al Hosani	United Arab Emirates	519	4	0
31	Zebiniso Abdusattorova	Uzbekistan	513	4	1
32	Aisha Al-Ali	United Arab Emirates	495	5	0
33	Mai Sadia	Pakistan	492	5	1
34	Alphonsine Foulkouma	Chad	466	2	0
35	Hallas Maria Abaifouta	Chad	426	1	0
36	Salome Atchoumngaye	Chad	306	3	1
37	Moreen Awor	Uganda	288	2	2
38	Sahar Almahjari	Yemen	129	1	0
39	Hend Abdullah Hamood	Yemen	127	0	0
40	Rehab Al-Sayaghi	Yemen	104	0	0

== Finals ==
Semifinals
1	Yasemin Anagöz (TUR)	7	27	28	24	26	25
4	Rezza Octavia (INA)	3	25	27	27	26	24
6	Nurul Fazil (MAS)	0	27	24	26
2	Gülnaz Büşranur Coşkun (TUR)	6	28	28	29

Gold medal match
1	Yasemin Anagöz (TUR)	6	26	27	27
2	Gülnaz Büşranur Coşkun (TUR)	0	22	25	26
Bronze medal match
4	Rezza Octavia (INA)	7	26	28	28	26
6	Nurul Fazil (MAS)	1	26	22	27	25

== Elimination round ==
=== Section 1 ===
1/24 finals
33	Sadia (PAK)	7	12	17	27	25	23
32	Al-Ali (UAE)	3	20	17	25	19	17
25	Mamatkulova (KGZ)	6	23	26	20
40	Al-Sayaghi (YEM)	0	1	10	-

1/16 finals
1	Anagöz (TUR)	6	26	28	25
33	Sadia (PAK)	0	22	23	23
17	Kalsoom (PAK)	4	26	26	24	22	21
16	Kanatbek Kyzy (KGZ)	6	24	24	27	29	27
9	Siddique (BAN)	7	25	27	27	25
6	Fazil (MAS)	1	17	27	23	20
25	Mamatkulova (KGZ)	6	24	28	26	24
8	Hamroeva (UZB)	2	23	28	24	24

1/8 finals
1	Anagöz (TUR)	6	27	28	27
16	Kanatbek Kyzy (KGZ)	0	26	23	25
9	Siddique (BAN)	6	28	28	28
25	Mamatkulova (KGZ)	0	18	16	23

Quarterfinals
1	Anagöz (TUR)	7	28	29	27	26	28
9	Siddique (BAN)	3	25	29	25	28	24

=== Section 2 ===
1/24 finals
37	Awor (UGA)	0	11	10	7
28	Aljarman (QAT)	6	23	24	24
29	Sylla (GUI)	7	25	20	24	28	21
36	Atchoumngaye (CHA)	3	23	21	24	16	19

1/16 finals
5	Ziyodakhon (UZB)	6	28	27	29
28	Aljarman (QAT)	0	23	24	20
21	Zubaydova (TJK)	4	19	23	20	25	22
12	Ramazanova (AZE)	6	24	21	26	23	25
13	Nasrin (BAN)	6	22	26	23	26	27
20	Zamanova (AZE)	4	23	25	24	21	22
29	Sylla (GUI)	0	23	24	23
4	Octavia (INA)	6	29	28	27

1/8 finals
5	Ziyodakhon (UZB)	6	28	27	29
21	Ramazanova (AZE)	0	23	24	24
13	Nasrin (BAN)	1	25	24	23	27
4	Octavia (INA)	7	28	24	27	29

Quarterfinals
5	Ziyodakhon (UZB)	2	24	27	24	26
4	Octavia (INA)	6	25	27	25	26

=== Section 3 ===
1/24 finals
35	Abaifouta (CHA)	6	18	18	20	16	25
30	Hosani (UAE)	4	13	21	16	25	22
27	Al-Hajri (QAT)	6	20	20	23
38	Almahjari (YEM)	0	9	-	-

1/16 finals
3	Abdollahi (IRI)	7	26	26	26	25
35	Abaifouta (CHA)	1	9	12	26	5
19	Kanatbek Kyzy (KGZ)	6	16	25	26	28	26
14	Ray (BAN)	4	27	26	25	27	25
11	Simonova (AZE)	4	21	25	23	26	26
22	Ahmadova (TJK)	6	22	21	24	20	24
27	Al-Hajri (QAT)	2	24	25	24	23
6	Fazil (MAS)	6	23	28	28	25

1/8 finals
3	Abdollahi (IRI)	6	25	26	27	28
14	Kanatbek Kyzy (KGZ)	2	23	27	21	22
22	Ahmadova (TJK)	4	27	21	15	26	23
6	Fazil (MAS)	6	25	23	25	25	24

Quarterfinals
3	Abdollahi (IRI)	4	23	28	27	25	21
6	Fazil (MAS)	6	28	22	25	27	27

=== Section 4 ===
1/24 finals
39	Hamood (YEM)	0	3	-	4
26	Alblooshi (UAE)	6	18	25	23
31	Abdusattorova (UZB)	6	18	23	23
34	Foulkouma (CHA)	4	5	19	22

1/16 finals
7	Haenza (INA)	6	26	28	27
26	Alblooshi (UAE)	0	25	26	25
23	Muhammad (PAK)	4	27	28	22	26	19
10	Er (TUR)	6	25	27	26	28	24
15	Arista (INA)	6	20	24	22
18	Tengku (MAS)	0	18	17	18
31	Abdusattorova (UZB)	0	23	24	23
2	Coşkun (TUR)	6	29	28	27

1/8 finals
7	Haenza (INA)	2	26	28	22	24
10	Er (TUR)	6	29	26	26	26
15	Arista (INA)	0	19	23	22
2	Coşkun (TUR)	6	27	27	27

Quarterfinals
10	Er (TUR)	1	27	26	27	26
2	Coşkun (TUR)	7	27	29	29	27
