= Arif Dwi Pangestu =

Indonesian recurve archer (born 2004)

Personal information
- Nickname: Arif
- Born: 25 March 2004 (age 22) Bantul, DI Yogyakarta, Indonesia

Sport
- Country: Indonesia
- Sport: Archery
- Event: recurve
Medal record
Men's recurve archery
Representing Indonesia
Asian Games
Bronze medal – third place	2022 Hangzhou	Team
Asian Championships
Bronze medal – third place	2023 Bangkok	Team
Asia Cup
Gold medal – first place	2025 Singapore	Mixed team
Islamic Solidarity Games
Silver medal – second place	2021 Konya	Individual
Silver medal – second place	2021 Konya	Team
SEA Games
Gold medal – first place	2019 Philippines	Men's team
Gold medal – first place	2021 Vietnam	Individual
Gold medal – first place	2021 Vietnam	Team
Gold medal – first place	2025 Thailand	Team
ASEAN University Games
Bronze medal – third place	2022 Ubon Ratchathani	Individual
Bronze medal – third place	2022 Ubon Ratchathani	Mixed team

Arif Dwi Pangestu (born 25 March 2004) is an Indonesian recurve archer. He competed in the men's individual event at the 2017 World Archery Youth Championships in Rosario, Argentina. He represented Indonesia at the 2019 SEA Games, in the men's individual recurve and team category, and he won the gold medal at the team category, together with Riau Ega Agatha and Hendra Purnama. He competed in the Men's individual archery event of the 2020 Olympics reaching rank 32.
