= Shamoli Ray =

Bangladeshi archer (born 1994)

Personal information
- Full name: Shamoli Ray
- Born: 5 April 1994 (age 32) Narail, Khulna Division, Bangladesh

Sport
- Country: Bangladesh
- Sport: Archery
- Event: Compound
Medal record
Women's archery
Representing Bangladesh
Islamic Solidarity Games
Silver medal – second place	2021 Konya	Team compound
South Asian Games
Gold medal – first place	2019 Pokhara	Team compound
- Updated on 24 February 2017

Shamoli Ray (born 5 April 1994) is a Bangladeshi competitive archer. At the 2016 Summer Olympics in Rio de Janeiro, she competed as a lone archer for the Bangladeshi team in the women's individual recurve through a tripartite invitation. There, Ray discharged a score of 600 points, 7 perfect tens, and 4 bull's eyes to take the fiftieth spot in the classification stage, before she challenged her opening round bout against the twelfth-seeded Mexican archer Gabriela Bayardo, which abruptly ended her Olympic debut in a severe 0–6 defeat.
