= Rezza Octavia =

Indonesian archer (born 2000)

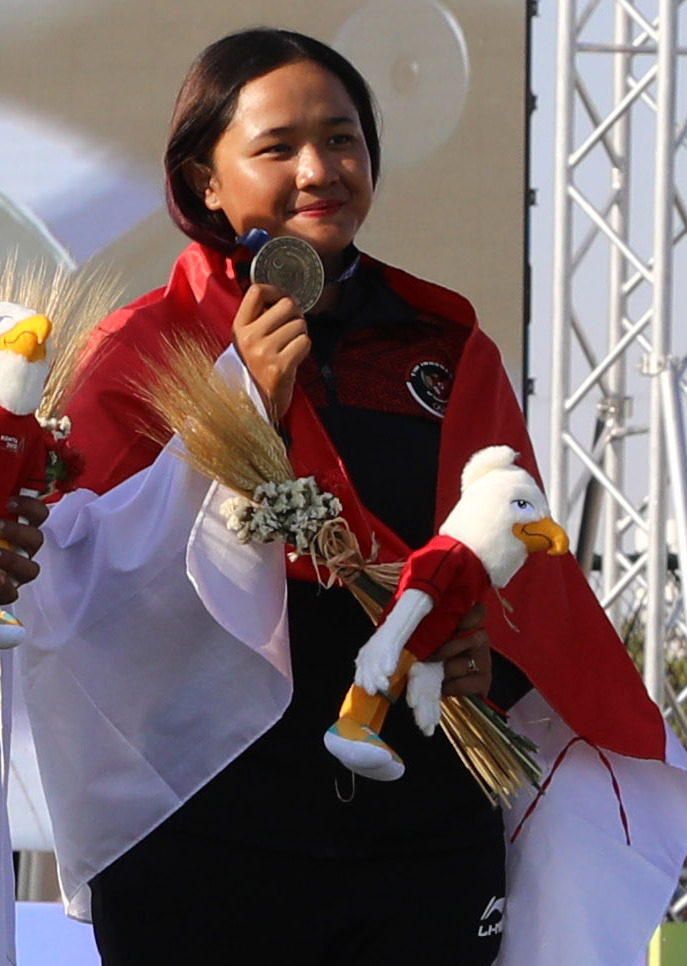

Personal information
- Nationality: Indonesian
- Born: 25 October 2000 (age 25) Sidoarjo, East Java, Indonesia

Sport
- Sport: Archery
Medal record
Women's recurve archery
Representing Indonesia
Asia Cup
Gold medal – first place	2025 Singapore	Women's team
Islamic Solidarity Games
Gold medal – first place	2021 Konya	Mixed team
Silver medal – second place	2021 Konya	Women's team
Bronze medal – third place	2021 Konya	Individual
SEA Games
Gold medal – first place	2021 Vietnam	Individual
Gold medal – first place	2021 Vietnam	Mixed team
Gold medal – first place	2025 Thailand	Women's team
ASEAN University Games
Gold medal – first place	2022 Ubon Ratchathani	Individual
Bronze medal – third place	2022 Ubon Ratchathani	Mixed team

Rezza Octavia (born 25 October 2000) is an Indonesian archer. She competed in the Women's individual event at the 2021 Islamic Solidarity Games.

== Career ==
Octavia started her career at the age of 12. She showed great talent and dedication in this sport. She has competed in various national and international tournaments since elementary school.

In 2022, Octavia winning two gold medals at the 2021 SEA Games in Vietnam. She won gold medals in the individual recurve and mixed team recurve.

Octavia also won a gold medal at the 2021 Islamic Solidarity Games in Konya, Turkey. She won a gold medal in the mixed team recurve.

Octavia represented Indonesia at the 2024 Summer Olympics, in the Women's individual and Women's team category.

== Awards ==
Award	Year	Category	Result	Ref.
Indonesian Olympic Committee East Java Awards	2021	Outstanding athlete	Won	
