= Sagor Islam =

Bangladeshi archer

Personal information
- Born: 5 June 2006 (age 20)

Sport
- Country: Bangladesh
- Sport: Archery
- Event: Recurve
- Coached by: Martin Frederick

Achievements and titles
- Highest world ranking: 52 (16 June 2025)
Medal record
Men's archery
Representing Bangladesh
Islamic Solidarity Games
Bronze medal – third place	2021 Konya	Team recurve

Md Sagor Islam (born 5 June 2006) is a Bangladeshi archer. He qualified for the 2024 Summer Olympics and was named his country's flag bearer.

== Biography ==
Islam was born on 5 June 2006, and grew up in the village of Choto Bangram, Rajshahi, Bangladesh. The youngest of four children, he was raised by his mother after his father died when he was age three. His mother ran a tea shop and worked from 5 a.m. to 11 p.m. each day to support the family. Islam developed an interest in archery after seeing competitors practice at a club located across the street from the tea shop.

Islam was signed up for the SB Club in 2017 and showed talent in the sport; his coach noted "Sagor had something special in him, I sensed it as soon as he started practising. He always gave attention to detail and did exactly what I asked him to do." His talent led to him earning a spot at the Bangladesh Krira Shikkha Protishtan, the national sports institute, in 2019. He made his international debut at the 2022 Archery World Cup, placing 17th in the individual and team events, while finishing 9th in the mixed team competition. He competed at the 2023 Archery World Cup and helped his team reach the quarterfinals; he also competed at the 2023 World Archery Championships and placed 113th in the individual recurve event, and later participated at the 2024 Archery World Cup. In June 2024, he won silver at the Final Individual Olympic Qualification Tournament, securing him a place at the 2024 Summer Olympics. He was named the Bangladeshi flag bearer for the opening Olympic ceremony.
