= Ruman Shana =

Bangladeshi archer (born 1995)

Personal information
- Full name: Mohammad Ruman Shana
- Nickname: M.R. Shana
- Nationality: Bangladeshi
- Born: 8 June 1995 (age 31) Koyra Upazila, Khulna, Bangladesh
- Spouse: Diya Siddique (m. 2023)

Sport
- Country: Bangladesh
- Sport: Archery
- Event: Recurve
- Coached by: Martin Frederick

Achievements and titles
- Highest world ranking: 10 (16 September 2019)
Medal record
Men's archery
Representing Bangladesh
Event	1st	2nd	3rd
World Championships	0	0	1
World Cup	0	1	0
Asian Championships	0	0	1
Islamic Solidarity Games	0	0	1
Asia Cup	1	1	1
South Asian Games	3	0	0
Total	4	2	4
World Championships
Bronze medal – third place	2019 's-Hertogenbosch	Individual recurve
World Cup
Silver medal – second place	2021 Lausanne	Mixed team recurve
Asian Championships
Bronze medal – third place	2021 Dhaka	Team recurve
Islamic Solidarity Games
Bronze medal – third place	2021 Konya	Team recurve
Asia Cup
Gold medal – first place	2019 Clark City	Individual recurve
Silver medal – second place	2019 Clark City	Team recurve
Bronze medal – third place	2019 Clark City	Mixed team recurve
South Asian Games
Gold medal – first place	2019 Pokhara	Individual recurve
Gold medal – first place	2019 Pokhara	Team recurve
Gold medal – first place	2019 Pokhara	Mixed team recurve
- Updated on 25 June 2025

Mohammad Ruman Shana (Bengali: রোমান সানা; born 8 June 1995) is a Bangladeshi archer. He won the bronze medal in recurve single's event of 2019 World Archery Championships and became the first Bangladeshi archer in history to win a medal in the competition. Shana won gold medal at the 2019 Asia Cup in the Philippines.

== Early life ==
Shana was born to the family of Abdul Gafur Shana and Beauty Begom and spent his childhood at Koyra village in Khulna. He used to play with arrow-bow made by bamboo during his school days. He was not much attentive to his school, instead, he used to remain busy playing football. However, he later opted to try his hand in archery when he was a student of class eight.

He lived in Khulna.

== Career ==
Shana won the gold medal in the First Asian Grand Prix 2014 in Bangkok, Thailand. He won another gold medal in the International Archery Tournament 2017, Bishkek, Kyrgyzstan.

In 2019, he won three international medal with first one- a silver medal- came in the ISSF International Solidarity Archery Championships. After that, he won a bronze in the 2019 World Archery Championships, and later, Roman won a gold medal in the Asia Cup ranking tournament.

In 2021, he along with Diya Siddique claimed silver medal in the recurve mixed team event during the 2021 Archery World Cup where Bangladesh emerged as runners-up to Netherlands in the final. Despite losing the final 5–1, it was the best performance by Bangladesh at an Archery World Championship. It also marked the first instance whereas Bangladesh managed to reach final in an event of Archery World Cup.

Shana has left Bangladesh and has settled in USA after taking retirement at 28 due to a clash with the coach and the federation.

== Recognition ==
In 2021, World Archery named him the 2019 Breakthrough Athlete of the Year. Shana has also won gold in the men's singles recurve category at the 2019 Asia Cup in the Philippines.
