= Kuwait at the 2021 Islamic Solidarity Games =

- IOC code: KUW
- NOC: Kuwait Olympic Committee

in Konya, Turkey
- Competitors: 61
- Medals: Gold 5 Silver 9 Bronze 12 Total 26

Islamic Solidarity Games appearances
- 2005; 2013; 2017; 2021; 2025

Kuwait participated in the 2021 Islamic Solidarity Games held in Konya, Turkey from 9 to 18 August 2022.

The games had been rescheduled several times. In May 2021, the ISSF postponed the event to August 2022 citing the COVID-19 pandemic situation in the participating countries.

== Medalists ==
Medal	Name	Sport	Event	Date
Gold	Abdulrahman Al-Faihan	Shooting	Men's trap	12 August
Gold	Mansour Alrashedi	Shooting	Women's trap	12 August
Gold	Sara Al-Hawal	Shooting	Men's skeet	13 August
Gold	Essa Al-Zenkawi	Athletics	Men's discus throw	11 August
Silver	Talal Al-Rashidi	Shooting	Men's trap	12 August
Silver	Sara Alhawal; Talal Al-Rashidi	Shooting	Mixed team trap	12 August
Silver	Eman Al Shamaa; Abdulaziz Alsaad	Shooting	Mixed team skeet	16 August
Silver	Saied Jafer Alali	Cycling	Men's individual time trial	14 August
Bronze	Yaqoub Al-Youha	Athletics	Men's 110 metres hurdles	11 August
Bronze	Majed Radhi Al-Sayed	Athletics	Men's pole vault	11 August

Medals by sport
Sport	1st place, gold medalist(s)	2nd place, silver medalist(s)	3rd place, bronze medalist(s)	Total
Athletics	1	0	2	3
Cycling	0	1	0	1
Karate	0	2	0	2
Kickboxing	0	2	0	2
Shooting	3	3	0	6
Swimming	1	1	0	2
Total	5	9	12	16
