= Alviyanto Prastyadi =

Indonesian archer (born 2002)

Personal information
- Nationality: Indonesian
- Born: 18 February 2002 (age 24) Klaten, Central Java, Indonesia

Sport
- Sport: Archery
Medal record
Men's archery
Representing Indonesia
Asian Championships
Bronze medal – third place	2023 Bangkok	Men's team
Islamic Solidarity Games
Silver medal – second place	2021 Konya	Men's team
SEA Games
Gold medal – first place	2021 Vietnam	Men's team

Alviyanto Prastyadi (born 18 February 2002) is an Indonesian archer. He competed in the men's individual event at the 2020 Summer Olympics.
