= Diya Siddique =

Bangladeshi archer (born 2004)

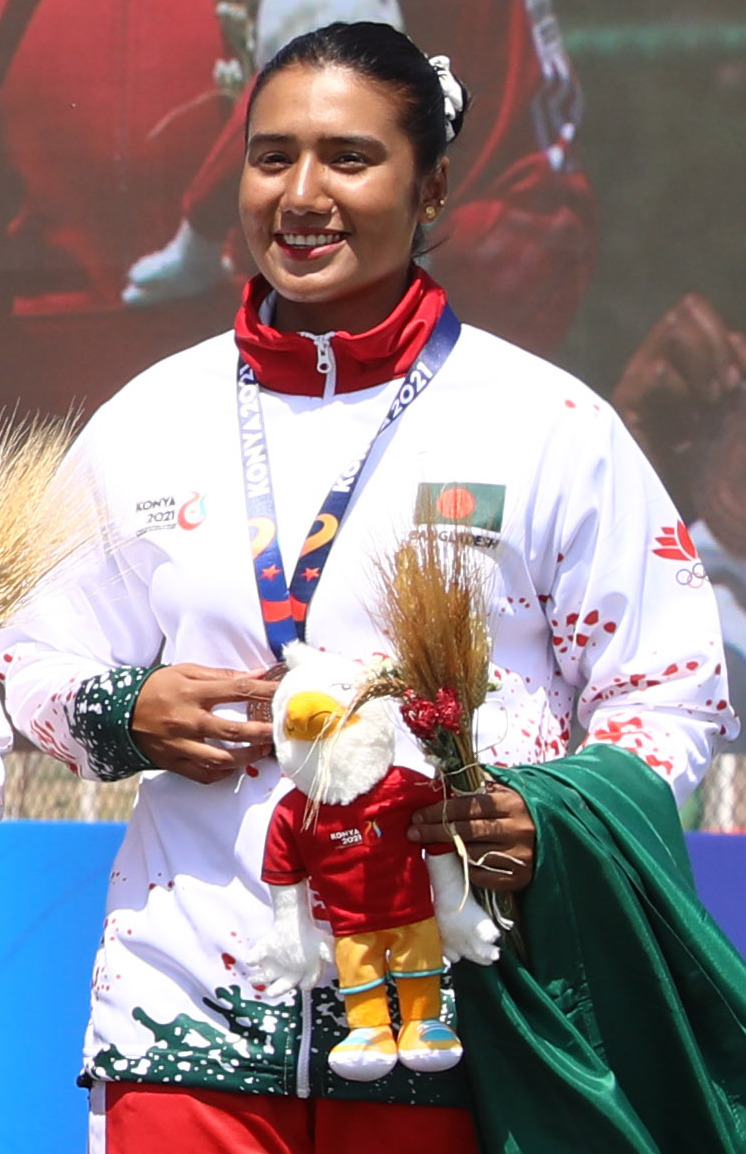

Personal information
- Full name: Diya Siddique
- Nickname: Diya
- Nationality: Bangladeshi
- Born: 19 February 2004 (age 22) Nilphamari, Bangladesh
- Spouse: Ruman Shana (m. 2023)

Sport
- Country: Bangladesh
- Sport: Archery
- Event: Recurve
- Coached by: Martin Frederick

Achievements and titles
- Highest world ranking: 34 (14 November 2022)
Medal record
Women's archery
Representing Bangladesh
Event	1st	2nd	3rd
World Cup	0	1	0
Asian Championships	0	1	1
Islamic Solidarity Games	0	0	1
Total	0	2	2
World Cup
Silver medal – second place	2021 Lausanne	Mixed team
Asian Championships
Silver medal – second place	2021 Dhaka	Mixed team
Bronze medal – third place	2021 Dhaka	Women's Team
Islamic Solidarity Games
Bronze medal – third place	2021 Konya	Women's Team
- Updated on 23 May 2023

Diya Siddique (born 19 February 2004) is a Bangladeshi archer. On 23 May 2021, she along with Ruman Shana claimed silver medal in the recurve mixed team event during the 2021 Archery World Cup where Bangladesh emerged as runners-up to Netherlands in the final. Despite losing the final 5–1, it was the best performance by Bangladesh at an Archery World Championship. It also marked the first instance whereas Bangladesh managed to reach final in an event of Archery World Cup.
