= Saudi Arabia at the 2021 Islamic Solidarity Games =

- IOC code: KSA
- NOC: Saudi Arabia Olympic Committee

in Konya, Turkey
- Competitors: 134
- Medals: Gold 2 Silver 12 Bronze 10 Total 24

Islamic Solidarity Games appearances
- 2005; 2013; 2017; 2021; 2025

Saudi Arabia participated in the 2021 Islamic Solidarity Games held in Konya, Turkey from 9 to 18 August 2022.

The games had been rescheduled several times. In May 2021, the ISSF postponed the event to August 2022 citing the COVID-19 pandemic situation in the participating countries.

== Medalists ==
Medal	Name	Sport	Event	Date
Silver	Mohammed Daouda Tolo	Athletics	Men's shot put	8 August
Bronze	Ibrahim Al-Marzuqi	Swimming	Men's 50 m butterfly (S5-S7)	7 August
Bronze	Ali Al-Khadrawi	Table tennis	Men's individual	8 August

Medals by sport
Sport	1st place, gold medalist(s)	2nd place, silver medalist(s)	3rd place, bronze medalist(s)	Total
Athletics	0	4	1	5
Football	0	1	0	1
Karate	1	0	2	3
Para swimming	0	0	1	1
Table tennis	0	1	1	2
Taekwondo	0	0	1	1
Weightlifting	1	6	4	6
Total	2	12	10	24

== Basketball ==
=== Women's 3x3 tournament ===
Group A

Pos	Team	Pld	W	L	PF	PA	PD	Qualification
1	Saudi Arabia	1	1	0	20	19	+1	Quarterfinals
2	Qatar	1	0	1	19	20	−1	Quarterfinals
3	Jordan	0	0	0	0	0	0	

Source: Konya 2021
Rules for classification: 1) Wins; 2) Head-to-head record; 3) Points scored.

14 August

Cancelled

Saudi Arabia	-–-	Jordan

Karatay Congress and Sport Center Konya

14 August

Report

Qatar	19–20	Saudi Arabia

Karatay Congress and Sport Center Konya

Quarterfinal

16 August

Report

Turkey	21–7	Saudi Arabia

Karatay Congress and Sport Center, Konya

== Football ==
Summary

Team	Event	Group stage				Semifinal	Final / BM	
Team	Event	Opposition Score	Opposition Score	Opposition Score	Rank	Opposition Score	Opposition Score	Rank
Saudi Arabia U-23 men's	Men's tournament	Azerbaijan; W 1–0	Morocco; W 2–0	Iran; W 3–0	1	Algeria; W 2–1	Turkey; L 0–1	2nd place, silver medalist(s)

Group B

Pos	Team	Pld	W	D	L	GF	GA	GD	Pts	Qualification
1	Saudi Arabia	3	3	0	0	6	0	+6	9	Advance to knockout stage
2	Azerbaijan	3	1	1	1	5	3	+2	4	Advance to knockout stage
3	Morocco	3	1	1	1	5	4	+1	4	
4	Iran	3	0	0	3	0	9	−9	0	

8 August 2022
16:00

Saudi Arabia	1–0	Azerbaijan
Al-Ghamdi 90+6'

Konya
10 August 2022
12:30

Morocco	0–2	Saudi Arabia
		Al-Johani 45+2'; Al-Mutairi 90+1'

Konya
12 August 2022
16:00

Iran	0–3 (w/o)	Saudi Arabia

Konya

Semifinal

14 August 2022
17:00

Saudi Arabia	2–1	Algeria
Asiri 14'; Al-Ghamdi 20'		Bekkouche 37' (pen.)

Cumhuriyet Stadium, Konya

Gold medal match

16 August 2022
17:00

Turkey	1–0	Saudi Arabia
Altunbaş 26'

Konya Metropolitan Municipality Stadium, Konya

== Handball ==
=== Men's tournament ===
Group A

Pos	Team	Pld	W	D	L	GF	GA	GD	Pts	Qualification
1	Saudi Arabia	2	1	1	0	56	52	+4	3	Semifinals
2	Qatar	2	1	1	0	49	47	+2	3	Semifinals
3	Morocco	2	0	0	2	45	51	−6	0	

Updated to match(es) played on 10 August 2022. Source:
Rules for classification: 1) Points; 2) Head-to-head points; 3) Head-to-head goal difference; 4) Head-to-head goals scored; 5) Goal difference; 6) Goals scored; 7) Draw.

10 August 2022; 11:00	Saudi Arabia	29–25	Morocco	Selçuklu Municipality International Sports Hall, Selçuklu

12 August 2022; 11:00	Qatar	27–27	Saudi Arabia	Selçuklu Municipality International Sports Hall, Selçuklu

Semifinal

13 August 2022; 15:00	Saudi Arabia	25–26	Turkey	Selçuklu Municipality International Sports Hall, Selçuklu
13 August 2022; 15:00		(15–16)		Selçuklu Municipality International Sports Hall, Selçuklu

Bronze medal game

14 August 2022; 13:00	Saudi Arabia	21–30	Iran	Selçuklu Municipality International Sports Hall, Selçuklu
14 August 2022; 13:00		(9–10)		Selçuklu Municipality International Sports Hall, Selçuklu

== Weightlifting ==
Results

Athlete	Event	Snatch		Clean & Jerk		Total	Result
Athlete	Event	Result	Rank	Result	Rank	Total	Result
Mansour Alsaleem	Men's -55kg	115	1st place, gold medalist(s)	137	2nd place, silver medalist(s)	252	2nd place, silver medalist(s)
Seraj Alsaleem	Men's -61kg	123	2nd place, silver medalist(s)	154	2nd place, silver medalist(s)	277	2nd place, silver medalist(s)
Abdulrahman Albeladi	Men's -73kg	130	3rd place, bronze medalist(s)	166	3rd place, bronze medalist(s)	296	3rd place, bronze medalist(s)
Ali Alalawi	Men's -81kg	138	9	170	9	308	9
Hussain Almajed	Men's -89kg	120	12	x	-	x	-
Ali Alothman	Men's -96kg	157	5	192	2nd place, silver medalist(s)	349	3rd place, bronze medalist(s)
Ali Ahmed Alkhazal	Men's -102kg	161	8	200	6	361	7
Hassan Al Radhi	Men's +109kg	161	5	200	5	361	5
Ghadah Altassan	Women's -45kg	43	4	59	4	102	4
Monerah Alrowitea	Women's -49kg	47	5	61	4	108	4
Alanoud Alshehri	Women's -59kg	63	6	78	5	141	5
