= United Arab Emirates at the 2021 Islamic Solidarity Games =

- IOC code: UAE
- NOC: United Arab Emirates National Olympic Committee

in Konya, Turkey
- Competitors: 57
- Medals: Gold 3 Silver 2 Bronze 5 Total 10

Islamic Solidarity Games appearances
- 2005; 2013; 2017; 2021; 2025

United Arab Emirates participated in the 2021 Islamic Solidarity Games held in Konya, Turkey from 9 to 18 August 2022.

The games had been rescheduled several times. In May 2021, the ISSF postponed the event to August 2022 citing the COVID-19 pandemic situation in the participating countries.

== Medalists ==
Medal	Name	Sport	Event	Date
Gold	Ahmed Al-Mansoori	Cycling	Men's Scratch	6 August
Gold	Yousif Mirza	Cycling	Men's points race	7 August
Bronze	Ahmed Al-Mansoori	Cycling	Men's points race	7 August

Medals by sport
Sport	1st place, gold medalist(s)	2nd place, silver medalist(s)	3rd place, bronze medalist(s)	Total
Cycling	2	1	2	5
Judo	1	1	1	3
Para archery	0	0	2	2
Total	3	2	5	10

== Weightlifting ==
Results

Athlete	Event	Snatch		Clean & Jerk		Total	Result
Athlete	Event	Result	Rank	Result	Rank	Total	Result
Mustafa Ahmad Mohammed	Men's -81kg	100	15	125	15	225	15
Alia Albastaki	Women's -64kg	53	8	58	7	111	7
Mai Almadani	Women's -71kg	63	6	75	6	138	6
