= Saraçoğlu Sport Complex =

Outdoor sports complex in Turkey

Coordinates: 37.819°N 32.564°E

Saraçoğlu Sport Complex (Turkish: Saraçoğlu Spor Tesisleri) is a multi-purpose outdoor arena in Karatay, Konya, Turkey.

The sport complex is located at Telsiz St. in Karatay district of Konya, Turkey. Competitions in sports branches like field hockey, shooting (trap and skeet), field archery and basketball, can be held at the complex.

The venue hosted the shooting and the archery competitions at the 2021 Islamic Solidarity Games.
