= Qatar at the 2021 Islamic Solidarity Games =

- IOC code: QAT
- NOC: Qatar Olympic Committee

in Konya, Turkey
- Competitors: 125
- Medals: Gold 4 Silver 3 Bronze 5 Total 12

Islamic Solidarity Games appearances
- 2005; 2013; 2017; 2021; 2025

Qatar participated in the 2021 Islamic Solidarity Games held in Konya, Turkey from 9 to 18 August 2022.

The games had been rescheduled several times. In May 2021, the ISSF postponed the event to August 2022 citing the COVID-19 pandemic situation in the participating countries.

== Medalists ==
Medal	Name	Sport	Event	Date
Gold	Bassem Hemeida	Athletics	Men's 400 metres hurdles	9 August
Gold	Abubaker Haydar Abdalla	Athletics	Men's 800 metres	9 August
Gold	Hamdi Alamin	Athletics	Men's high jump	9 August
Gold	Qatar men's national handball team: Abdelrahman Abdalla; Mohammed Abdelmageed; Nour Ahmed; Hamdi Ayed; Zineeooine Boumendjel; Faruk Colo; Amir Denguir; Ahmed Elmeniawy; Amine Guehis; Moustafa Heiba; Salem Jedaied; Hani Kakhi; Rayan Laribi; Ahmed Saleh; Mohamed Soussi; Rasheed Yusuff; Ameen Zakkar; Anis Zouaoui	Handball	Men's tournament	14 August
Silver	Abdirahman Saeed Hassan	Athletics	Men's 1500 metres	9 August
Silver	Moaaz Mohamed Ibrahim	Athletics	Men's discus throw	9 August
Silver	Ahmed Magour	Athletics	Men's javelin throw	9 August
Bronze	Musab Adam Ali	Athletics	Men's 3000 metres steeplechase	9 August
Bronze	Rashid Saleh Hamad	Shooting	Men's trap	11 August
Bronze	Maram Fatnassi	Taekwondo	Women's 67 kg	10 August

Medals by sport
Sport	1st place, gold medalist(s)	2nd place, silver medalist(s)	3rd place, bronze medalist(s)	Total
Athletics	3	3	1	7
Fencing	0	0	2	2
Handball	1	0	0	1
Shooting	0	0	1	1
Taekwondo	0	0	1	1
Total	4	3	5	12

== Athletics ==
Track & road events

Athlete	Event	Semifinal		Final	
Athlete	Event	Result	Rank	Result	Rank
Bassem Hemeida	400 m hurdles			48.67 GR	1st place, gold medalist(s)

== Basketball ==
=== Men's 3x3 tournament ===
Group A

Pos	Team	Pld	W	L	PF	PA	PD	Qualification
1	Senegal	3	3	0	51	34	+17	Quarterfinals
2	Jordan	3	1	2	46	47	−1	Quarterfinals
3	Qatar	3	1	2	45	46	−1	
4	Palestine	3	1	2	41	56	−15	

Source: Konya 2021
Rules for classification: 1) Wins; 2) Head-to-head record; 3) Points scored.

13 August
13:00

Report

Palestine	12–21	Qatar

Karatay Congress and Sport Center, Konya

13 August
16:00

Report

Qatar	13–22	Jordan

Karatay Congress and Sport Center Konya

14 August
16:00

Report

Qatar	19–20	Saudi Arabia

Karatay Congress and Sport Center Konya

=== Women's 3x3 tournament ===
Group A

Pos	Team	Pld	W	L	PF	PA	PD	Qualification
1	Saudi Arabia	1	1	0	20	19	+1	Quarterfinals
2	Qatar	1	0	1	19	20	−1	Quarterfinals
3	Jordan	0	0	0	0	0	0	

Source: Konya 2021
Rules for classification: 1) Wins; 2) Head-to-head record; 3) Points scored.

14 August

Cancelled

Qatar	-–-	Jordan

Karatay Congress and Sport Center Konya

14 August

Report

Qatar	19–20	Saudi Arabia

Karatay Congress and Sport Center Konya

Quarterfinal

16 August

Report

Azerbaijan	21–2	Qatar

Karatay Congress and Sport Center, Konya

== Handball ==
=== Men's tournament ===
Group A

Pos	Team	Pld	W	D	L	GF	GA	GD	Pts	Qualification
1	Saudi Arabia	2	1	1	0	56	52	+4	3	Semifinals
2	Qatar	2	1	1	0	49	47	+2	3	Semifinals
3	Morocco	2	0	0	2	45	51	−6	0	

Rules for classification: 1) Points; 2) Head-to-head points; 3) Head-to-head goal difference; 4) Head-to-head goals scored; 5) Goal difference; 6) Goals scored; 7) Draw.

8 August 2022; 13:00	Qatar	22–20	Morocco	Selçuklu Municipality International Sports Hall, Selçuklu

12 August 2022; 11:00	Qatar	27–27	Saudi Arabia	Selçuklu Municipality International Sports Hall, Selçuklu

Semifinal

13 August 2022; 17:00	Iran	23–24	Qatar	Selçuklu Municipality International Sports Hall, Selçuklu
13 August 2022; 17:00		(11–14)		Selçuklu Municipality International Sports Hall, Selçuklu

Gold medal game

14 August 2022; 18:00	Turkey	23–26	Qatar	Selçuklu Municipality International Sports Hall, Selçuklu
14 August 2022; 18:00		(10–14)		Selçuklu Municipality International Sports Hall, Selçuklu

== Volleyball ==
=== Men's tournament ===
Pool B

Pos	Team	Pld	W	L	Pts	SW	SL	SR	SPW	SPL	SPR	Qualification
1	Iran	3	2	1	7	8	3	2.667	265	243	1.091	Semifinals
2	Turkey (H)	3	2	1	5	7	6	1.167	315	317	0.994	Semifinals
3	Qatar	3	2	1	5	6	6	1.000	267	272	0.982	
4	Pakistan	3	0	3	1	3	8	0.375	282	297	0.949	

Source: TVF
(H) Host

Date	Time		Score		Set 1	Set 2	Set 3	Set 4	Set 5	Total	Report
9 Aug	14:00	Iran	3–0	Qatar	25–15	26–24	25–23			76–62	Report
11 Aug	16:00	Turkey	1–3	Qatar	25–22	21–25	24–26	14–25		84–98	Report
13 Aug	13:00	Pakistan	2–3	Qatar	25–21	25–13	31–33	23–25	8–15	112–107	Report

== Wrestling ==
Men's Greco-Roman

Athlete	Event	Round of 16	Quarterfinal	Semifinal	Repesaj	Final / BM	
Athlete	Event	Opposition Result	Opposition Result	Opposition Result	Opposition Result	Opposition Result	Rank
Jafar Khan Khan	82 kg	Bye	Kuş (TUR); L	did not advance			7
Bakhit Badr	77 kg	Bye	Maafi (TUN); L	did not advance			7
