= Turkey at the 2021 Islamic Solidarity Games =

- IOC code: TUR
- NOC: Turkish Olympic Committee

in Konya, Türkiye
- Competitors: 462 in 19 sports
- Flag bearers: Nafia Kuş; Sena Keçeci
- Medals Ranked 1st: Gold 145 Silver 107 Bronze 89 Total 341

Islamic Solidarity Games appearances (overview)
- 2005; 2013; 2017; 2021; 2025

Turkey participated in the 2021 Islamic Solidarity Games held in Konya, Turkey from 9 to 18 August 2022.

The games had been rescheduled several times. In May 2021, the Islamic Solidarity Sports Federation (ISSF) postponed the event to August 2022, citing the COVID-19 pandemic situation in the participating countries.

== Medalists ==
Medals by sport
Sport	1st place, gold medalist(s)	2nd place, silver medalist(s)	3rd place, bronze medalist(s)	Total
Archery	6	3	3	12
Athletics	13	10	6	29
Basketball	0	0	1	1
Bocce	4	5	1	10
Fencing	6	4	2	12
Football	1	0	0	1
Gymnastics	12	6	10	28
Handball	1	1	0	2
Judo	6	2	5	13
Karate	4	2	4	10
Kickboxing	18	5	4	27
Para archery	6	6	2	14
Para athletics	1	2	1	4
Para swimming	12	9	8	29
Para table tennis	7	2	1	10
Swimming	29	26	11	66
Shooting	2	2	2	6
Table tennis	1	1	2	4
Taekwondo	2	5	7	14
Volleyball	1	0	1	2
Weightlifting	11	11	6	28
Wrestling	2	5	12	19
Total	145	107	89	341

Medal	Name	Sport	Event	Date
Gold	Sevilay Öztürk	Para swimming	Women's 50 m butterfly (S5-S7)	7 August
Gold	Şevval Beren Mutlu	Para swimming	Women's 400 m freestyle (S6-S10)	7 August
Gold	Koral Berkin Kutlu	Para swimming	Men's 50 m butterfly (S5-S7)	7 August
Gold	Özge Yılmaz	Table tennis	Women's individual	8 August
Gold	Buse Arıkazan	Athletics	Women's pole vault	8 August
Gold	Demet Parlak	Athletics	Women's pole vault	8 August
Gold	Emel Dereli	Athletics	Women's shot put	8 August
Gold	Yasemin Can	Athletics	Women's 10000 m	8 August
Gold	Alperen Karahan	Athletics	Men's shot put	8 August
Gold	Sümeyye Boyacı	Para swimming	Women's 200 m freestyle (S4-S5)	8 August
Gold	Koral Berkin Kutlu	Para swimming	Men's 200 m freestyle (S4-S5))	8 August
Gold	Sevilay Öztürk	Para swimming	Women's 50 m freestyle (S4-S10)	9 August
Gold	Ersu Şaşma	Athletics	Men's pole vault	9 August
Gold	Necati Er	Athletics	Men's triple jump	9 August
Gold	Ekaterina Guliyev	Athletics	Women's 800 m	9 August
Gold	Özlem Becerek	Athletics	Women's discus throw	9 August
Gold	Rukiye Yıldırım	Taekwondo	Women's 49 kg	10 August
Gold	Ahmet Önder; Ferhat Arıcan; Adem Asil	Gymnastics	Men's team	10 August
Gold	Adem Asil	Gymnastics	Individual all-around	10 August
Gold	Esra Türkmen	Athletics	Women's javelin throw	10 August
Gold	Sümeyye Boyacı	Para swimming	Women's 50 m backstroke (S4-S5)	10 August
Gold	Beytullah Eroğlu	Para swimming	Men's 50 m backstroke (S4-S5)	10 August
Gold	Şevval Beren Mutlu	Para swimming	Women's 100 m backstroke (S6-S10)	7 August
Gold	Buse Tosun	Wrestling	Women's Freestyle 72 kg	11 August
Gold	Sude Yaren Uzunçavdar	Taekwondo	Women's 73 kg	11 August
Gold	Adem Asil	Gymnastics	Men's rings	11 August
Gold	Ahmet Önder	Gymnastics	Men's floor	11 August
Gold	Ahmet Önder	Gymnastics	Men's horizontal bar	11 August
Gold	Ferhat Arıcan	Gymnastics	Men's parallel bars	11 August
Gold	Koral Berkin Kutlu	Para swimming	Men's 100 m freestyle (S4-S10)	11 August
Gold	Emine Avcu	Para swimming	Women's 150 m individual medley (SM4)	11 August
Gold	Sümeyye Boyacı	Para swimming	Women's 100 m freestyle (S4-S10)	11 August
Gold	Duygu Alıcı	Weightlifting	Women's 49 kg snatch	11 August
Gold	Duygu Alıcı	Weightlifting	Women's 49 kg Clean & jerk	11 August
Gold	Duygu Alıcı	Weightlifting	Women's 49 kg Total	11 August
Gold	Zübeyde Süpürgeci	Para Athletics	Women's 100 m T53-54	11 August
Gold	Yasemin Can	Athletics	Women's 5000 m	11 August
Gold	Şevval Ayaz	Athletics	Women's 100 m hurdles	11 August
Gold	Ramil Guliyev; Jak Ali Harvey; Emre Zafer Barnes; Kayhan Özer	Athletics	Men's 4 × 100 metres relay	12 August
Gold	Sadık Savaş; Yavuz Papağan	Para archery	Recurve bow men's team	12 August
Gold	Merve Nur Eroğlu; Yavuz Papağan	Para archery	Recurve bow mixed team	12 August
Gold	Necla Şahin; Burak Altay	Bocce	Volo mixed team	12 August
Gold	İnci Ece Öztürk	Bocce	Women's volo progressive shooting	12 August
Gold	Rukiye Varol	Bocce	Women's raffa singles	12 August
Gold	Mehmet Can Yakın	Bocce	Men's volo progressive shooting	12 August
Gold	Yusuf Fehmi Genç	Weightlifting	Men's 67 kg Clean & jerk	12 August
Gold	Zeynep Yetgil	Wrestling	Women's Freestyle 55 kg	12 August
Gold	Safiye Sarıtürk Temizdemir; Oğuzhan Tüzün	Shooting	Mixed team trap	12 August
Gold	Yiğit Aslan	Swimming	Men's 400 m freestyle	13 August
Gold	Berke Saka	Swimming	Men's 200 m backstroke	13 August
Gold	Emre Sakçı	Swimming	Men's 50 m breaststroke	13 August
Gold	Merve Tuncel	Swimming	Women's 800 m freestyle	13 August
Gold	Viktoriya Zeynep Güneş	Swimming	Women's 200 m individual medley	13 August
Gold	Emre Gürdenli; Doğa Çelik	Swimming	Men's 4×100 m freestyle	13 August
Gold	Nuray Güngör	Weightlifting	Women's 64 kg Clean & jerk	13 August
Gold	Nuray Güngör	Weightlifting	Women's 64 kg Total	13 August
Gold	Merve Nur Eroğlu	Para archery	Women's individual recurve bow	13 August
Gold	Yiğit Caner Aydın	Para archery	Men's W1 open	13 August
Gold	Nil Mısır	Para archery	Women's W1 open	13 August
Gold	Öznur Cüre	Para archery	Women's compound bow individual	13 August
Gold	Nesim Turan	Para table tennis	Men's Class 4 Individual	14 August
Gold	Ali Öztürk	Para table tennis	Men's Class 5 Individual	14 August
Gold	Neslihan Kavas	Para table tennis	Women's Class 9 Individual	14 August
Gold	Merve Cansu Demir	Para table tennis	Women's Class 10 Individual	14 August
Gold	Iryna Shchukla	Fencing	Women's sabre individual	14 August
Gold	Ayşe Begüm Onbaşı	Gymnastics	Women's aerobic individual	14 August
Gold	Ahmet Meriç Tutmamış; Can Sarı; Mehmet Utku Çırak	Gymnastics	Aerobic trio	14 August
Gold	Turkey aerobic team	Gymnastics	Aerobic team	14 August
Gold	Aysel Özkan	Weightlifting	Women's 71 kg Clean & jerk	14 August
Gold	Dilara Uçan	Weightlifting	Women's 76 kg snatch	14 August
Gold	Dilara Uçan	Weightlifting	Women's 76 kg total	14 August
Gold	Dilara Narin	Weightlifting	Women's 81 kg Clean & jerk	14 August
Gold	Dilara Narin	Weightlifting	Women's 81 kg total	14 August
Gold	Baturalp Ünlü	Swimming	Men's 200 m freestyle	14 August
Gold	Berkay Ömer Öğretir	Swimming	Men's 200 m breaststroke	14 August
Gold	Mert Kılavuz	Swimming	Men's 1500 m freestyle	14 August
Gold	Ekaterina Avramova	Swimming	Women's 100 m backstroke	14 August
Gold	Ecem Dönmez; Deniz Ertan; Merve Tuncel; Beril Böcekler	Swimming	Women's 4×200 m freestyle	14 August
Gold	Turkey women's national handball team: Merve Durdu; Halime İslamoğlu; Kübra Sarıkaya; Elif Sıla Aydın; Emine Gökdemir; Bilgenur Öztürk; Neslihan Çalışkan; Betül Yılmaz; Ayşenur Sormaz; Yasemin Şahin; Gülcan Tügel; Beyza Karaçam; Merve Özbolluk; Cansu Akalın; Ceren Demirçelen; Meryem Erdoğan	Handball	Women's tournament	14 August
Gold	Sena Can	Shooting	Women's skeet	15 August
Gold	Tuğçe Beder	Judo	Women's 48 kg	15 August
Gold	İrem Karamete	Fencing	Women's individual foil	15 August
Gold	Aysun Demirci	Traditional Turkish archery	Women's 60 m target shooting	15 August
Gold	Neslihan Kavas; Merve Cansu Demir; Ümran Ertiş	Para table tennis	Women's Team Class 9-10	15 August
Gold	Abdullah Öztürk; Nesim Turan; Süleyman Vural	Para table tennis	Men's Team Class 4	15 August
Gold	Ali Öztürk; Hamza Çalışkan; Ahmet Nihat Yıldırım	Para table tennis	Men's Team Class 5	15 August
Gold	İlknur Nihan Çakıcı	Swimming	Women's 100 m freestyle	15 August
Gold	Ekaterina Avramova	Swimming	Women's 200 m backstroke	15 August
Gold	Defne Taçyıldız	Swimming	Women's 200 m butterfly	15 August
Gold	Merve Tuncel	Swimming	Women's 1500 m freestyle	15 August
Gold	Berke Saka	Swimming	Men's 100 m backstroke	15 August
Gold	Emre Sakçı	Swimming	Men's 50 m freestyle	15 August
Gold	Efe Turan; Yiğit Aslan; Batuhan Filiz; Baturalp Ünlü	Swimming	Men's 4×200 m freestyle relay	15 August
Gold	Aysun Demirci; Sena Keçeci; Fulya Erilli	Traditional Turkish archery	Women's team	15 August
Gold	Turkey women's national volleyball team: Ayçin Akyol; Zeynep Sude Demirel; Buse Kayacan Sonsırma; Melis Yılmaz; Tutku Burcu Yüzgenç; Emine Arıcı; Yasemin Yıldırım; İlkin Aydın; Yaprak Erkek; İdil Naz Kanbur; Ezgi Akyaldız; Aslıhan Kılıç; Buket Gülübay; Ceren Kapucu	Volleyball	Women's tournament	15 August
Gold	Fatma Ayvacı	Traditional Turkish archery	Women's limitless flight shooting	16 August
Gold	Hüseyin Çalışkan	Traditional Turkish archery	Men's limitless flight shooting	16 August
Gold	Vedat Albayrak	Judo	Men's 81 kg	16 August
Gold	Mihael Žgank	Judo	Men's 90 kg	16 August
Gold	Nurcan Yılmaz	Judo	Women's 78 kg	16 August
Gold	Kayra Sayit	Judo	Women's +78 kg	16 August
Gold	Aleyna Ertürk	Fencing	Women's individual épée	16 August
Gold	Enver Yıldırım	Fencing	Men's individual sabre	16 August
Gold	Viktoriya Zeynep Güneş	Swimming	Women's 100 m breaststroke	16 August
Gold	Deniz Ertan	Swimming	Women's 400 m individual medley	16 August
Gold	Merve Tuncel	Swimming	Women's 200 m freestyle	16 August
Gold	Ekaterina Avramova	Swimming	Women's 50 m backstroke	16 August
Gold	Mert Kılavuz	Swimming	Men's 800 m freestyle	16 August
Gold	İlknur Nihan Çakıcı; Sezin Eligül; Merve Tuncel; Viktoriya Zeynep Güneş	Swimming	Women's 4×100 m freestyle relay	16 August
Gold	Turkey national under-23 football team	Football	Men's team	16 August
Gold	Yeşim Bostan; Ayşe Bera Süzer; Sevim Yıldır	Archery	Women's compound team	17 August
Gold	Yeşim Bostan; Emircan Haney	Archery	Compound mixed team	17 August
Gold	Yasemin Anagöz; Gülnaz Büşranur Coşkun; Aslı Er	Archery	Women's recurve team	17 August
Gold	Mete Gazoz; Samet Ak; Muhammed Yıldırmış	Archery	Men's recurve team	17 August
Gold	Turkey national judo team	Judo	Women's team	17 August
Gold	Almila Birçe Durukan; Firuze Ayşen Güneş; Alisa İsbir; İrem Karamete	Fencing	Women's team foil	17 August
Gold	Lal Erman; Aleyna Ertürk; Gökçe Günaç; Damlanur Sönmüş	Fencing	Women's team épée	17 August
Gold	Bengisu Yıldız	Artistic Gımnastics	Women's artistic Individual all-around	17 August
Gold	Bengisu Yıldız; Sevgi Seda Kayışoğlu; Bilge Tarhan	Artistic Gymnastics	Women's artistic team	17 August
Gold	Deniz Ertan	Swimming	Women's 100 m butterfly	17 August
Gold	Viktoriya Zeynep Güneş	Swimming	Women's 200 m breaststroke	17 August
Gold	Merve Tuncel	Swimming	Women's 400 m freestyle	17 August
Gold	İlknur Nihan Çakıcı	Swimming	Women's 50 m freestyle	17 August
Gold	Ekaterina Avramova; Viktoriya Zeynep Güneş; Deniz Ertan; İlknur Nihan Çakıcı	Swimming	Women's 4×100 m medley relay	17 August
Gold	Ali Sofuoğlu	Karate	Men's kata	17 August
Gold	Tuba Yakan	Karate	Women's 55 kg	17 August
Gold	Samet Ak	Archery	Men's recurve individual	18 August
Gold	Yasemin Anagöz	Archery	Women's recurve individual	18 August
Gold	Dilara Bozan	Karate	Women's kata	18 August
Gold	Ali Sofuoğlu; Emre Vefa Göktaş; Enes Özdemir	Karate	Men's team kata	18 August
Gold	Sevgi Seda Kayışoğlu	SArtistic Gymnastics	Women's artistic uneven bars	18 August
Gold	Bedirhan Ersayar	Kickboxing	Men's full contact 51 kg	18 August
Gold	Seyit Battal Ay	Kickboxing	Men's full contact 60 kg	18 August
Gold	Muhammed Süleyman Gülle	Kickboxing	Men's full contact 67 kg	18 August
Gold	Mahsum Teker	Kickboxing	Men's full contact 81 kg	18 August
Gold	Emrah Yaşar	Kickboxing	Men's full contact 86 kg	18 August
Gold	Metin Yürük	Kickboxing	Men's full contact 91 kg	18 August
Gold	Hayriye Türksoy Hançer	Kickboxing	Women's full contact 48 kg	18 August
Gold	Emine Arslan	Kickboxing	Women's full contact 52 kg	18 August
Gold	Gözde Nur Göktaş	Kickboxing	Women's full contact 65 kg	18 August
Gold	Sabriye Gür	Kickboxing	Women's full contact 70 kg	18 August
Gold	Bilal Dural	Kickboxing	Men's low kick 54 kg	18 August
Gold	Ali Ataberk Gürbüzcan	Kickboxing	Men's low kick 60 kg	18 August
Gold	Aydın Aslan	Kickboxing	Men's low kick 71 kg	18 August
Gold	Ünal Alkayış	Kickboxing	Men's low kick 75 kg	18 August
Gold	Ferhat Arslan	Kickboxing	Men's low kick 86 kg	18 August
Gold	Feyzanur Azizoğlu	Kickboxing	Women's low kick 56 kg	18 August
Gold	Kübra Kocakuş	Kickboxing	Women's low kick 60 kg	18 August
Gold	Bediha Tacyıldız	Kickboxing	Women's low kick 65 kg	18 August
Silver	Sümeyye Boyacı	Para swimming	Women's 50 m butterfly (S5-S7)	7 August
Silver	Beytullah Eroğlu	Para swimming	Men's 50 m butterfly (S5-S7)	7 August
Silver	Pınar Akyol	Athletics	Women's shot put	8 August
Silver	Kıvılcım Kaya Salman	Athletics	Women's hammer throw	8 August
Silver	Hamit Demir	Para swimming	Men's 200 m freestyle (S4-S5))	8 August
Silver	Sevilay Öztürk	Para swimming	Women's 200 m freestyle (S4-S5)	8 August
Silver	Şevval Beren Mutlu	Para swimming	Women's 200 m individual medley (SM5-SM10)	8 August
Silver	Şevval Beren Mutlu	Para swimming	Women's 100 m breaststroke (SB4-SB9)	9 August
Silver	Nurten Mermer	Athletics	Women's discus throw	9 August
Silver	Tuğba Danışmaz	Athletics	Women's long jump	9 August
Silver	Yasmani Copello	Athletics	Men's 400 m hurdles	9 August
Silver	Deniz Dağdelen	Taekwondo	Men's 54 kg	9 August
Silver	Görkem Polat	Taekwondo	Men's 58 kg	9 August
Silver	Hatice Kübra İlgün	Taekwondo	Women's 57 kg	9 August
Silver	Hakan Reçber	Taekwondo	Men's 63 kg	10 August
Silver	Mustafa Sessiz	Wrestling	Men's Freestyle 97 kg	10 August
Silver	Eda Tuğsuz	Athletics	Women's javelin throw	10 August
Silver	Sevilay Öztürk	Para swimming	Women's 50 m backstroke (S4-S5)	10 August
Silver	Muhammet Akdeniz	Wrestling	Men's Freestyle 79 kg	11 August
Silver	Erhan Yaylacı	Wrestling	Men's Freestyle 92 kg	11 August
Silver	Salim Ercan	Wrestling	Men's Freestyle 125 kg	11 August
Silver	Hüseyin Kartal	Taekwondo	Men's 80 kg	11 August
Silver	Adem Asil	Gymnastics	Men's vault	11 August
Silver	Ahmet Önder	Gymnastics	Men's parallel bars	11 August
Silver	Hamit Demir	Para swimming	Men's 150 m individual medley (SM4)	11 August
Silver	Sevilay Öztürk	Para swimming	Women's 100 m freestyle (S4-S10)	11 August
Silver	Cansu Bektaş	Weightlifting	Women's 46 kg snatch	11 August
Silver	Cansu Bektaş	Weightlifting	Women's 46 kg Clean & jerk	11 August
Silver	Cansu Bektaş	Weightlifting	Women's 46 kg Total	11 August
Silver	Şaziye Erdoğan	Weightlifting	Women's 49 kg snatch	11 August
Silver	Şaziye Erdoğan	Weightlifting	Women's 49 kg Clean & jerk	11 August
Silver	Şaziye Erdoğan	Weightlifting	Women's 49 kg Total	11 August
Silver	Zeynep Acet	Para Athletics	Women's 100 m T53-54	11 August
Silver	Abdullah Ilgaz	Para Athletics	Men's high jump T46-47	11 August
Silver	Ramil Guliyev	Athletics	Men's 200 m	11 August
Silver	Eşref Apak	Athletics	Men's hammer throw	11 August
Silver	Safiye Sarıtürk Temizdemir	Shooting	Women's Trap	11 August
Silver	Sibel Altınkaya; Özge Yılmaz; Simay Kulakçeken	Table tennis	Women’s teams	11 August
Silver	Ekaterina Guliyev	Athletics	Women's 800 m	12 August
Silver	Elif Polat; Ekaterina Guliyev; Büşra Yıldırım; Eda Nur Tulum	Athletics	Women's 4 × 400 metres relay	12 August
Silver	Bülent Korkmaz; Murat Turan	Para archery	Compound bow men's team	12 August
Silver	Öznur Cüre; Sevgi Yorulmaz	Para archery	Compound bow women's team	12 August
Silver	Sevgi Yorulmaz; Bülent Korkmaz	Para archery	Compound bow mixed team	12 August
Silver	Bahar Çil; Esile Emen	Bocce	Women's raffa double	12 August
Silver	Cem Şimşek; Erdal Kantemir	Bocce	Men's raffa double	12 August
Silver	Faik Dursun Öztürk	Bocce	Men's progressive shooting raffa	12 August
Silver	Oğuzhan Turhan	Bocce	Men's raffa singles	12 August
Silver	Esile Emen; Cem Şimşek	Bocce	Raffa mixed team	12 August
Silver	Batuhan Filiz	Swimming	Men's 400 m freestyle	13 August
Silver	Berkay Ömer Öğretir	Swimming	Men's 50 m breaststroke	13 August
Silver	Deniz Ertan	Swimming	Women's 800 m freestyle	13 August
Silver	Viktoriya Zeynep Güneş	Swimming	Women's 50 m breaststroke	13 August
Silver	Deniz Ertan	Swimming	Women's 200 m individual medley	13 August
Silver	Nuray Güngör	Weightlifting	Women's 64 kg snatch	13 August
Silver	Berfin Altun	Weightlifting	Women's 64 kg Clean & jerk	13 August
Silver	Bahattin Hekimoğlu	Para archery	Men's W1 open	13 August
Silver	Fatma Danabaş	Para archery	Women's W1 open	13 August
Silver	Erdoğan Aygan	Para archery	Men's compound bow individual	13 August
Silver	Osman Yıldırım	Wrestling	Men's Greco-Roman 130 kg	13 August
Silver	Abdullah Öztürk	Para table tennis	Men's Class 4 Individual	14 August
Silver	Hamza Çalışkan	Para table tennis	Men's Class 5 Individual	14 August
Silver	Martino Minutu	Fencing	Men's Foil Individual	14 August
Silver	Nil Deniz Bal; Can Derviş	Gymnastics	Aerobic mixed pairs	14 August
Silver	Mehmet Utku Çırak	Gymnastics	Men's aerobic individual	14 August
Silver	Aysel Özkan	Weightlifting	Women's 71 kg snatch	14 August
Silver	Aysel Özkan	Weightlifting	Women's 71 kg total	14 August
Silver	Dilara Narin	Weightlifting	Women's 81 kg snatch	14 August
Silver	Berkay Ömer Öğretir	Swimming	Men's 200 m breaststroke	14 August
Silver	Sudem Denizli	Swimming	Women's 100 m backstroke	14 August
Silver	Yiğit Aslan	Swimming	Men's 1500 m freestyle	14 August
Silver	Ümitcan Güreş	Swimming	Men's 100 m butterfly	14 August
Silver	Sanberk Yiğit Oktar	Swimming	Men's 200 m individual medley	14 August
Silver	Turkey men's national handball team: Hüseyin Bereket; Enis Yatkın; Enis Harun Hacıoğlu; Baran Nalbantoğlu; Fatih Çalkamış; Sedat Yıldırım; Gökay Bilim; Atakan Şirin; Eray Karakoç; Durmuş Ali Tınkır; Cemal Kütahya; Doğukan Keser; Şevket Yağmuroğlu; Alper Aydın; İlkan Keleşoğlu	Handball	Men's tournament	14 August
Silver	Şeyma Özerler	Judo	Women's 63 kg	15 August
Silver	Alisa İşbir	Fencing	Women's individual foil	15 August
Silver	Sena Keçeci	Traditional Turkish archery	Women's 60 m target shooting	15 August
Silver	Muhammet Seyhun Kaya	Shooting	Men's skeet	15 August
Silver	Sudem Denizli	Swimming	Women's 200 m backstroke	15 August
Silver	Kaan Korkmaz	Swimming	Men's 400 m individual medley	15 August
Silver	Nida Eliz Üstündağ	Swimming	Women's 200 m butterfly	15 August
Silver	Mert Ali Satır	Swimming	Men's 100 m backstroke	15 August
Silver	Deniz Ertan	Swimming	Women's 1500 m freestyle	15 August
Silver	Oğuz Okçu; Bayram Koçak; Hayati Akkaya	Traditional Turkish archery	Men's team	15 August
Silver	Şebnem Saliha Çakıroğlu	Traditional Turkish archery	Women's limitless flight shooting	16 August
Silver	İbrahim Balaban	Traditional Turkish archery	Men's limitless flight shooting	16 August
Silver	Alp Eyüpoğlu; Mustafa Burak Çufadar; Martino Minuto; Utku Özyalçın	Fencing	Men's team foil	16 August
Silver	Hazal Özkan	Swimming	Women's 100 m breaststroke	16 August
Silver	Viktoriya Zeynep Güneş	Swimming	Women's 400 m individual medley	16 August
Silver	Beril Böcekler	Swimming	Women's 200 m freestyle	16 August
Silver	Sezin Eligül	Swimming	Women's 50 m backstroke	16 August
Silver	Mert Ali Satır	Swimming	Men's 50 m backstroke	16 August
Silver	Yiğit Aslan	Swimming	Men's 800 m freestyle	16 August
Silver	Yasemin Anagöz; Mete Gazoz	Archery	Recurve mixed team	17 August
Silver	Turkey national judo team	Judo	Men's team	17 August
Silver	Nida Eliz Üstündağ	Swimming	Women's 100 m butterfly	17 August
Silver	Defne Coşkun	Swimming	Women's 200 m breaststroke	17 August
Silver	Beril Böcekler	Swimming	Women's 400 m freestyle	17 August
Silver	Muhammed Anasız; Tolga Aslan; Kerem Çağlayan; Enver Yıldırım	Fencing	Men's team sabre	17 August
Silver	Berke Saka; Berkay Ömer Öğretir; Ümitcan Güreş; Emre Sakçı	Swimming	Men's 4×100 m medley relay	17 August
Silver	Yeşim Bostan	Archery	Women's compound individual	18 August
Silver	Gülnaz Büşranur Coşkun	Archery	Women's recurve individual	18 August
Silver	Gülbahar Gözütok	Karate	Women's 61 kg	18 August
Silver	Meltem Hocaoğlu	Karate	Women's +68 kg	18 August
Silver	Bengisu Yıldız	Artistic Gymnastics	Women's artistic uneven bars	18 August
Silver	Bilge Tarhan	Artistic Gymnastics	Women's artistic vault	18 August
Silver	Ayşe Karaca	Kickboxing	Women's full contact 56 kg	18 August
Silver	Büşra Demirayak	Kickboxing	Women's full contact 56 kg	18 August
Silver	Hatip Emlek	Kickboxing	Men's low kick 57 kg	18 August
Silver	Mehmet Zeki Kaya	Kickboxing	Men's low kick 63.5 kg	18 August
Silver	Kadir Yıldırım	Kickboxing	Men's low kick +91 kg	18 August
Bronze	Emine Avcu	Para swimming	Women's 50 m butterfly (S5-S7)	7 August
Bronze	Uğur Şenel	Para swimming	Men's 400 m freestyle (S6-S10)	7 August
Bronze	Sibel Altınkaya	Table tennis	Women's individual	8 August
Bronze	Emine Avcu	Para swimming	Women's 200 m freestyle (S4-S5)	8 August
Bronze	Emine Avcu	Para swimming	Women's 50 m freestyle (S4-S10)	9 August
Bronze	Meryem Nur Tunuğ	Para swimming	Women's 100 m breaststroke (SB4-SB9)	9 August
Bronze	Koral Berkin Kutlu	Para swimming	Men's 50 m freestyle (S4-S10)	8 August
Bronze	Emre Zafer Barnes	Athletics	Men's 100 m	9 August
Bronze	Zeliha Ağrıs	Taekwondo	Women's 53 kg	9 August
Bronze	Fazlı Eryılmaz	Wrestling	Men's Freestyle 74 kg	10 August
Bronze	Osman Göçen	Wrestling	Men's Freestyle 86 kg	10 August
Bronze	Ferhat Can Kavurat	Taekwondo	Men's 68 kg	10 August
Bronze	Emine Avcu	Para swimming	Women's 50 m backstroke (S4-S5)	10 August
Bronze	Hamit Demir	Para swimming	Men's 50 m backstroke (S4-S5)	10 August
Bronze	Recep Topal	Wrestling	Men's Freestyle 61 kg	11 August
Bronze	Rahime Arı	Wrestling	Women's Freestyle 53 kg	11 August
Bronze	Enbiya Taha Biçer	Taekwondo	Men's 87 kg	11 August
Bronze	Ahmet Önder	Gymnastics	Men's rings	11 August
Bronze	Ahmet Önder	Gymnastics	Men's vault	11 August
Bronze	Adem Asil	Gymnastics	Men's floor	11 August
Bronze	Ferhat Arıcan	Gymnastics	Men's pommel horse	11 August
Bronze	Nurşah Usta	Para Athletics	Women's 100 m T53-54	11 August
Bronze	Özkan Baltacı	Athletics	Men's hammer throw	11 August
Bronze	Tuğba Danışmaz	Athletics	Women's triple jump	11 August
Bronze	Oğuzhan Kaya; Edanur Tulum; Sinan Ören; Büşra Yıldırım	Athletics	Mixed 4 × 400 m Relay	11 August
Bronze	İbrahim Gündüz; Tugay Şirzat Yılmaz; Abdullah Talha Yiğenler	Table tennis	Men’s teams	11 August
Bronze	Necati Er	Athletics	Men's long jump	12 August
Bronze	Simay Özçiftçi; Şevval Ayaz; Cansu Nimet Sayın; Elif Polat	Athletics	Women's 4 × 100 metres relay	12 August
Bronze	Neşe Şahin	Bocce	Women's progressive shooting raffa	12 August
Bronze	Kaan Kahriman	Weightlifting	Men's 67 kg snatch	12 August
Bronze	Yusuf Fehmi Genç	Weightlifting	Men's 67 kg total	12 August
Bronze	Ferdi Hardal	Weightlifting	Men's 61 kg snatch	12 August
Bronze	Cansel Özkan	Weightlifting	Women's 59 kg snatch	12 August
Bronze	Murat Dağ	Wrestling	Men's Greco-Roman 72 kg	12 August
Bronze	Emrah Kuş	Wrestling	Men's Greco-Roman 82 kg	12 August
Bronze	Beytullah Kayışdağ	Wrestling	Men's Greco-Roman 97 kg	12 August
Bronze	Mehtap Gültekin	Wrestling	Women's Freestyle 76 kg	12 August
Bronze	İkra Kayır	Taekwondo	Women's 62 kg	12 August
Bronze	Nafia Kuş	Taekwondo	Women's 73 kg	12 August
Bronze	Muhammed Emin Yıldız	Taekwondo	Men's 74 kg	12 August
Bronze	Emre Kutalmış Ateşli	Taekwondo	Men's +87 kg	12 August
Bronze	Melikşah Düğen	Swimming	Men's 200 m backstroke	13 August
Bronze	Gülşen Samancı	Swimming	Women's 50 m breaststroke	13 August
Bronze	Berfin Altun	Weightlifting	Women's 64 kg total	13 August
Bronze	Yağmur Şengül	Para archery	Women's individual recurve bow	13 August
Bronze	Nihat Türkmenoğlu	Para archery	Men's W1 open	13 August
Bronze	Ayhan Karakuş	Wrestling	Men's Greco-Roman 60 kg	13 August
Bronze	Furkan Bayrak	Wrestling	Men's Greco-Roman 77 kg	13 August
Bronze	Elvira Kamaloğlu	Wrestling	Women's Freestyle 57 kg	13 August
Bronze	Aslı Demir	Wrestling	Women's Freestyle 68 kg	13 August
Bronze	Turkey rhythmic team	Gymnastics	Group 3 Ribbons + 2 Balls	13 August
Bronze	Ümran Ertiş	Para table tennis	Women's Class 10 Individual	14 August
Bronze	Nazlı Özgör; Nihatcan Gül	Gymnastics	Aerobic mixed pairs	14 August
Bronze	Dilara Uçan	Weightlifting	Women's 76 kg Clean & jerk	14 August
Bronze	Batuhan Filiz	Swimming	Men's 200 m freestyle	14 August
Bronze	Berke Saka	Swimming	Men's 200 m individual medley	14 August
Bronze	Aleyna Özkan	Swimming	Women's 50 m butterfly	14 August
Bronze	İlayda Merve Koçyiğit	Judo	Women's 52 kg	15 August
Bronze	İrem Korkmaz	Judo	Women's 57 kg	15 August
Bronze	Umalt Demirel	Judo	Men's 73 kg	15 August
Bronze	Firuze Ayşen Güneş	Fencing	Women's individual foil	15 August
Bronze	Mustafa Serhat Sahin	Shooting	Men's skeet	15 August
Bronze	Oğuz Okçu	Traditional Turkish archery	Men's 70 m target shooting	15 August
Bronze	Aylin Çakır; Nil Güngör; Iryna Shchukla; Pınar Miray Şişik	Fencing	Women's team sabre	15 August
Bronze	Turkey men's national volleyball team: Ahmet Samet Baltacı; Beytullah Hatipoğlu; Gökhan Gökgöz; Burak Mert; Cafer Kırkıt; Mehmet Hacıoğlu; İzzet Ünver; Ahmet Tumer; Yunus Emre Tayaz; Burakhan Tosun; Kaan Gürbüz; Ediz Kaan Fırıncıoğlu; İzzet Alp Akkuş; Orçun Ergün	Volleyball	Men's tournament	15 August
Bronze	Nagihan Tunç	Traditional Turkish archery	Women's limitless flight shooting	16 August
Bronze	Fatih Yıldız	Traditional Turkish archery	Men's limitless flight shooting	16 August
Bronze	Minel Akdeniz	Judo	Women's 70 kg	16 August
Bronze	Mert Şişmanlar	Judo	Men's 100 kg	16 August
Bronze	Kaan Özcan	Swimming	Men's 200 m butterfly	16 August
Bronze	Doruk Tekin	Swimming	Men's 50 m backstroke	16 August
Bronze	Sevgi Seda Kayışoğlu	Artistic Gymnastics	Women's artistic Individual all-around	17 August
Bronze	Emre Sakçı	Swimming	Men's 100 m freestyle	17 August
Bronze	Ümitcan Güreş	Swimming	Men's 50 m butterfly	17 August
Bronze	Sezin Eligül	Swimming	Women's 50 m freestyle	17 August
Bronze	Serap Özçelik	Karate	Women's 50 kg	17 August
Bronze	Damla Pelit; Damla Su Türemen; Zehra Kaya	Karate	Women's team kata	17 August
Bronze	Turkey women's national 3x3 team	3x3 basketball	Women's team	17 August
Bronze	Mete Gazoz	Archery	Men's recurve individual	18 August
Bronze	Emircan Haney	Archery	Men's compound individual	18 August
Bronze	Ayşe Bera Süzer	Archery	Women's compound individual	18 August
Bronze	Eda Eltemur	Karate	Women's 68 kg	18 August
Bronze	Fatih Şen	Karate	Men's +84 kg	18 August
Bronze	Bengisu Yıldız	Artistic Gymnastics	Women's artistic vault	18 August
Bronze	Bengisu Yıldız	Artistic Gymnastics	Women's artistic balance beam	18 August
Bronze	Bilge Tarhan	Artistic Gymnastics	Women's artistic floor	18 August
Bronze	Emre Yıldırım	Kickboxing	Men's full contact 75 kg	18 August
Bronze	Salih Samet Oruç	Kickboxing	Men's low kick 51 kg	18 August
Bronze	Fatih Erman	Kickboxing	Men's low kick 81 kg	18 August
Bronze	Zeliha Doğan	Kickboxing	Women's low kick 52 kg	18 August

== Archery ==
Recurve

Athlete	Event	Ranking round		Round of 32	Round of 16	Quarterfinals	Semifinals	Final / BM	
Athlete	Event	Score	Seed	Opposition Score	Opposition Score	Opposition Score	Opposition Score	Opposition Score	Rank
Mete Gazoz	Men's individual	687	1	Saqib (PAK); W 6-0	Islam (BAN); W 7-1	Nam (TJK); W 6-0	Pangestu (INA); L 4-6	Ungalov (UZB); W 6-0	3rd place, bronze medalist(s)
Samet Ak	Men's individual	675	2	Salem (QAT); W 6-0	Aliyev (AZE); W 6-0	Rubel (BAN); W 6-0	Ungalov (UZB); W 6-4	Pangestu (INA); W 6-5	1st place, gold medalist(s)
Muhammed Yıldırmış	Men's individual	661	4	Alharbi (KUW); W 6-0	Chen (UZB); W 6-0	Pangestu (INA); L 5-6	Did not advance		5
Yasemin Anagöz	Women's individual	645	1	Sadia (PAK); W 6-0	Kanatbek Kyzy (KGZ); W 6-0	Siddique (BAN); W 7-3	Octavia (INA); W 7-3	Coşkun (TUR); W 6-0	1st place, gold medalist(s)
Gülnaz Büşranur Coşkun	Women's individual	633	2	Abdusattorova (UZB); W 6-0	Arista (INA); W 6-0	Er (TUR); W 7-1	Fazil (MAS); W 6-0	Anagöz (TUR); L 0-6	2nd place, silver medalist(s)
Aslı Er	Women's individual	600	10	Muhammad (PAK); W 6-4	Haenza (INA); W 6-2	Coşkun (TUR); L 1-7	Did not advance		8
Yasemin Anagöz; Mete Gazoz	Mixed team	1332	1	—N/a	Yemen; W	United Arab Emirates; W 6-0	Uzbekistan; W 5-1	Indonesia; L 1-5	2nd place, silver medalist(s)
Mete Gazoz; Samet Ak; Muhammed Yıldırmış	Men's team	2023	1	—N/a	Bye	Azerbaijan; W 6-0	Bangladesh; W 6-2	Indonesia; W 6-2	1st place, gold medalist(s)
Yasemin Anagöz; Gülnaz Büşranur Coşkun; Aslı Er	Women's team	1878	1	—N/a	Bye	Pakistan; W 5-1	Uzbekistan; W 6-0	Indonesia; W 6-0	1st place, gold medalist(s)

Compound

Athlete	Event	Ranking round		Round of 16	Quarterfinals	Semifinals	Final / BM	
Athlete	Event	Score	Seed	Opposition Score	Opposition Score	Opposition Score	Opposition Score	Rank
Emircan Haney	Men's individual	703	1	Alrodhan (KSA); W 149-134	Wardhana (INA); W 147-144	Palizban (IRI); L 148-149	Uslu (TUR); W 143-140	3rd place, bronze medalist(s)
Egemen Uslu	Men's individual	687	7	Madandar (IRI); W 143-140	Malallah (KUW); W 142-140	Mazuki (MAS); L 146-147	Haney (TUR); L 140-143	4
Serdar Maraş	Men's individual	686	9	Wardhana (INA); L 145-145	Did not advance			9
Yeşim Bostan	Women's individual	693	1	Bye	Halim (MAS); W 146-143	Akter (BAN); W 148-146	Bybordy (IRI); L 142-146	2nd place, silver medalist(s)
Ayşe Bera Süzer	Women's individual	691	2	Bye	Fadhly (INA); W 147-138	Bybordy (IRI); L 140-144	Akter (BAN); W 136-133	3rd place, bronze medalist(s)
Sevim Yıldır	Women's individual	684	4	Bye	Akter (BAN); L 140-144	Did not advance		7
Yeşim Bostan; Emircan Haney	Mixed team	1396	1	—N/a	Bye	Malaysia; W 157-155	Iran; W 156-149	1st place, gold medalist(s)
Emircan Haney; Egemen Uslu; Serdar Maraş	Men's team	2076	1	—N/a	Bye	Malaysia; L 228-229	Iran; L 230-233	4
Yeşim Bostan; Ayşe Bera Süzer; Sevim Yıldır	Women's team	2068	1	—N/a			Bangladesh; W 229-222	1st place, gold medalist(s)

== Athletics ==
=== Men ===
Track & road events

Athlete	Event	Semifinal		Final	
Athlete	Event	Result	Rank	Result	Rank
Emre Zafer Barnes	100 m	10.11	8	9.99	3rd place, bronze medalist(s)
Jak Ali Harvey	100 m	10.10	7	DSQ	—N/a
Ramil Guliyev	200 m	20.67	4	20.24	2nd place, silver medalist(s)
Aras Kaya	5000 m	—N/a	—N/a	15:56.90	4
Aras Kaya	10000 m	—N/a	—N/a	28:34.71	4
Mikdat Sevler	110 m hurdles	13.56	4	DNF	—N/a
Sinan Ören	400 m hurdles		DNF	Did not advance	—N/a
Yasmani Copello	400 m hurdles	49.87	2	48.86	2nd place, silver medalist(s)
Emre Zafer Barnes; Ramil Guliyev; Kayhan Özer; Batuhan Altıntaş	4 × 100 m relay	39.54	1	38.74	1st place, gold medalist(s)
Oğuzhan Kaya; Yasmani Copello; Sinan Ören; İsmail Nezir	4 × 400 m relay	R17.4.3	DQ	Did not advance	—N/a

Field events

Athlete	Event	Final	
Athlete	Event	Result	Rank
Alperen Karahan	Shot put	20.46	1st place, gold medalist(s)
Ersu Şaşma	Pole vault	5.60	1st place, gold medalist(s)
Necati Er	Triple jump	16.73	1st place, gold medalist(s)
Necati Er	Long jump	7.83	3rd place, bronze medalist(s)
Muammer Demir	Long jump	7.37	9
Eşref Apak	Hammer throw	71.34	2nd place, silver medalist(s)
Özkan Baltacı	Hammer throw	68.90	3rd place, bronze medalist(s)
Ömer Şahin	Discus throw	60.02	4

=== Women ===
Track & road events

Athlete	Event	Semifinal		Final	
Athlete	Event	Result	Rank	Result	Rank
Elif Polat	100 m	11.43	6	11.32	6
Simay Özçiftçi	100 m	11.74	11	Did not advance	-
Elif Polat	200 m	23.16	3	23.41	5
Şilan Ayyıldız	800 m	—N/a	—N/a	2:04.76	4
Ekaterina Guliyev	800 m	—N/a	—N/a	2:02.28	1st place, gold medalist(s)
Şilan Ayyıldız	1500 m	—N/a	—N/a	4:19.79	5
Ekaterina Guliyev	1500 m	—N/a	—N/a	4:16.41	2nd place, silver medalist(s)
Yayla Günen	5000 m	—N/a	—N/a	17:26.30	9
Yasemin Can	5000 m	—N/a	—N/a	16:23.10	1st place, gold medalist(s)
Yayla Günen	10000 m	—N/a	—N/a	35:23.93	6
Yasemin Can	10000 m	—N/a	—N/a	32:34.33	1st place, gold medalist(s)
Şevval Ayaz	100 m hurdles	13.15	1	13.21	1st place, gold medalist(s)
Elif Polat; Simay Özçiftçi; Edanur Tulum; Büşra Yıldırım	4 × 100 m relay	—N/a	—N/a	44.49	3rd place, bronze medalist(s)
Şilan Ayyıldız; Ekaterine Guliyev; Edanur Tulum; Büşra Yıldırım	4 × 400 m relay	—N/a	—N/a	3:35.24	2nd place, silver medalist(s)

Field events

Athlete	Event	Final	
Athlete	Event	Result	Rank
Buse Savaşkan	High jump	1.82	4
Gizem Akgöz	Long jump	6.28	6
Tuğba Danışmaz	Long jump	6.34	2nd place, silver medalist(s)
Tuğba Danışmaz	Triple jump	13.95	3rd place, bronze medalist(s)
Kıvılcım Kaya Salman	Hammer throw	65.68	2nd place, silver medalist(s)
Özlem Becerek	Discus throw	54.91	1st place, gold medalist(s)
Nurten Mermer	Discus throw	52.85	2nd place, silver medalist(s)
Eda Tuğsuz	Javelin throw	56.59	2nd place, silver medalist(s)
Esra Türkmen	Javelin throw	57.46	1st place, gold medalist(s)
Emel Dereli	Shot put	17.25	1st place, gold medalist(s)
Pınar Akyol	Shot put	16.87	2nd place, silver medalist(s)
Buse Arıkazan	Pole vault	4.00	1st place, gold medalist(s)
Demet Parlak	Pole vault	4.00	1st place, gold medalist(s)

== Basketball ==
=== Men's 3x3 tournament ===
Group C

Pos	Team	Pld	W	L	PF	PA	PD	Qualification
1	Azerbaijan	3	3	0	57	38	+19	Quarterfinals
2	Mali	3	1	2	48	46	+2	Quarterfinals
3	Turkey	3	1	2	44	53	−9	
4	Morocco	3	1	2	40	52	−12	

Source: Konya 2021
Rules for classification: 1) Wins; 2) Head-to-head record; 3) Points scored.

13 August

Report

Azerbaijan	21–12	Turkey

Karatay Congress and Sport Center, Konya

15 August

Report

Turkey	11–20	Mali

Karatay Congress and Sport Center Konya

15 August

Report

Turkey	21–12	Morocco

Karatay Congress and Sport Center Konya

=== Women's 3x3 tournament ===
Group C

Pos	Team	Pld	W	L	PF	PA	PD	Qualification
1	Azerbaijan	2	2	0	35	16	+19	Quarterfinals
2	Turkey	2	1	1	33	17	+16	Quarterfinals
3	Kyrgyzstan	2	0	2	7	42	−35	

Source: Konya 2021
Rules for classification: 1) Wins; 2) Head-to-head record; 3) Points scored.

13 August
18:10

Report

Turkey	12–14	Azerbaijan

Karatay Congress and Sport Center Konya

13 August
21:00

Report

Turkey	21–3	Kyrgyzstan

Karatay Congress and Sport Center Konya

Quarterfinal

16 August

Report

Turkey	21–7	Saudi Arabia

Karatay Congress and Sport Center, Konya

Semifinal

17 August
17:20

Report

Turkey	11–16	Mali

Karatay Congress and Sport Center, Konya

Bronze medal match

17 August
19:10

Report

Turkey	14–10	Uzbekistan

Karatay Congress and Sport Center, Konya

== Football ==
Summary

Team	Event	Group stage				Semifinal	Final / BM	
Team	Event	Opposition Score	Opposition Score	Opposition Score	Rank	Opposition Score	Opposition Score	Rank
Turkey U-23 men's	Men's tournament	Senegal; W 1–0	Cameroon; W 3–2	Algeria; D 1–1	1	Azerbaijan; W 1–0	Saudi Arabia; W 1–0	1st place, gold medalist(s)

Group A

Pos	Team	Pld	W	D	L	GF	GA	GD	Pts	Qualification
1	Turkey (H)	3	2	1	0	5	3	+2	7	Advance to knockout stage
2	Algeria	3	1	2	0	5	2	+3	5	Advance to knockout stage
3	Senegal	3	1	1	1	3	2	+1	4	
4	Cameroon	3	0	0	3	2	8	−6	0	

(H) Hosts
8 August 2022
16:00

Turkey	1–0	Senegal
Gümüşkaya 27'

Konya
10 August 2022
12:30

Turkey	3–2	Cameroon
Karadağ 45'; Aydın 60'; Sanuç 80'		Marou 24'; Wassou 85'

Konya
12 August 2022
16:00

Turkey	1–1	Algeria
Cherifi 13' (o.g.)		Temine 19'

Konya

Semifinal

14 August 2022

Turkey	1–0	Azerbaijan
Gümüşkaya 43'

Konya

Gold medal match

16 August 2022
17:00

Turkey	1–0	Saudi Arabia
Altunbaş 26'

Konya

== Gymnastics ==
Artistic Gymnastics

Athlete	Event	Score	Rank
Ferhat Arıcan; Adem Asil; Ahmet Önder	Men's Teams	168.550	1st place, gold medalist(s)
Adem Asil	Men's All-Around	84,900	1st place, gold medalist(s)
Ahmet Önder	Men's All-Around	80.150	5
Adem Asil	Men's Rings	14,900	1st place, gold medalist(s)
Ahmet Önder	Men's Rings	14,250	3rd place, bronze medalist(s)
Ahmet Önder	Men's Floor	14,650	1st place, gold medalist(s)
Adem Asil	Men's Floor	14,200	3rd place, bronze medalist(s)
Ferhat Arıcan	Men's Parallel Bars	14,900	1st place, gold medalist(s)
Ahmet Önder	Men's Parallel Bars	14,750	2nd place, silver medalist(s)
Ahmet Önder	Men's Horizontal Bar	14,300	1st place, gold medalist(s)
Ferhat Arıcan	Men's Pommel Horse	14,350	3rd place, bronze medalist(s)
Adem Asil	Men's Vault	13,625	2nd place, silver medalist(s)
Ahmet Önder	Men's Vault	13.600	3rd place, bronze medalist(s)

Aerobic Gymnastics

Athlete	Event	Qualification		Final	
Athlete	Event	Score	Rank	Score	Rank
Ayşe Begüm Onbaşı	Women's Individual	21.000	1 Q	21.000	1st place, gold medalist(s)
Mehmet Utku Çırak	Men's Individual	19.350	2 Q	19.250	2nd place, silver medalist(s)
Mehmet Utku Çırak; Can Sarı; Ahmet Meriç	Trio	18.400	1 Q	19.050	1st place, gold medalist(s)
Nil Deniz Bal; Can Derviş	Mixed Pairs	19.550	1 Q	19.250	2nd place, silver medalist(s)
Nazlı Özgür; Nihatcan Gül	Mixed Pairs	19.200	3 Q	19.000	3rd place, bronze medalist(s)

== Judo ==
Men

Athlete	Event	Round of 16	Quarterfinals	Semifinals	Repechage	Final / BM	
Athlete	Event	Opposition Result	Opposition Result	Opposition Result	Opposition Result	Opposition Result	Rank
Ejder Toktay	−66 kg	Paziaud (GAM); W	Nurillaev (UZB); L	—N/a	Agamämmedow (TKM); L	—N/a	7
Bayram Kandemir	−73 kg	Sagynaliev (KGZ); L	Did not advance				
Umalt Demirel	−73 kg	Saeed (YEM); W	Zourdani (ALG); W	Akhadov (UZB); L	—N/a	Njie (GAM); W	3rd place, bronze medalist(s)
Vedat Albayrak	−81 kg	Fathipoorardal (IRI); W	Arkabay (KAZ); W	Tckayev (AZE); W	—N/a	Tatalashvili (UAE); W	1st place, gold medalist(s)
Mihael Zgank	−90 kg	—N/a	Madzhidov (TJK); W	Grjgdrian (UAE); W	—N/a	Ustopiriyon (TJK); W	1st place, gold medalist(s)
Ömer Aydın	−90 kg	Ssekiwunga (UGA); W	Ustopiriyon (TJK); L	—N/a	Diao (SEN); W	Grjgdrian (UAE); L	5
Mert Şişmanlar	−100 kg		Lahboub (MAR); W	Gasimov (AZE); L		Bozbayev (KAZ); W	3rd place, bronze medalist(s)

Women

Athlete	Event	Round of 16	Quarterfinals	Semifinals	Repechage	Final / BM	
Athlete	Event	Opposition Result	Opposition Result	Opposition Result	Opposition Result	Opposition Result	Rank
Tuğçe Beder	−48 kg	—N/a	Rezzoug (ALG); W	Aliyeva (AZE); W	—N/a	Aliyeva (AZE); W	1st place, gold medalist(s)
İlayda Merve Koçyiğit	−52 kg	Mammadaliyeva (AZE); W	Kadamboeva (UZB); L	—N/a	Segue (CHA); W	Aissahine (ALG); W	3rd place, bronze medalist(s)
İrem Korkmaz	−57 kg	Mianbigue (CHA); W	Ermaganbetova (UZB); L	—N/a	Chegenisharafi (IRI); W	Kochkonbaeva (KGZ); W	3rd place, bronze medalist(s)
Şeyma Özerler	−63 kg	Syerina (INA); W	Faye (SEN); W	Biock (CMR); W	—N/a	Belkadi (ALG); L	2nd place, silver medalist(s)
Minel Akdeniz	−70 kg	Kamara (GAM); W	Nazarova (UZB); W	Landolsi (TUN); L	—N/a	Hasanli (AZE); W	3rd place, bronze medalist(s)
Sebile Akbulut	-78 kg	—N/a	Yuldoshova (UZB); W	Ouallal (ALG); W	—N/a	Narmukhamedova (KGZ); W	1st place, gold medalist(s)
Kayra Sayit	+78 kg	—N/a	Khalmurzaeva (KGZ); W	Sagna (SEN); W	—N/a	Asselah (ALG); W	1st place, gold medalist(s)

== Karate ==
Men

Athlete	Event	Round of 16	Quarterfinals	Semifinals	Final / BM	
Athlete	Event	Opposition Result	Opposition Result	Opposition Result	Opposition Result	Rank
Ali Sofuoğlu	Kata	—N/a	25.34 (1)	25.82 (1)	Shahrjerdi (IRI); W 26.06	1st place, gold medalist(s)
Emre Vefa Göktaş; Enes Özdemir; Ali Sofuoğlu	Team kata	—N/a	25.74 (1)	26.20 (1)	Kuwait; W 26.86	1st place, gold medalist(s)
Eray Şamdan	Kumite −60 kg	Fallou (SEN); W 1-0	Saputra (INA); W 1-0	Shaaban (KUW); L 1-2	Helassa (ALG); L 1-2	5
Burak Uygur	Kumite −67 kg	Almutairi (KUW); W 0-0	Nemati (IRI); L 1-2	Did not advance		
Erman Eltemur	Kumite −75 kg	Nurlanov (KGZ); L 0-3	Did not advance			
Uğur Aktaş	Kumite −84 kg	Zhangbyr (KAZ); L 2-2	Did not advance			
Fatih Şen	Kumite +84 kg	Domnenko (TJK); W 10-0	Yeldashov (KAZ); W 5-2	Hamedi (KSA); L 0-4	Khedher (TUN); W 3-2	3rd place, bronze medalist(s)

Women

Athlete	Event	Round of 16	Quarterfinals	Semifinals	Final / BM	
Athlete	Event	Opposition Result	Opposition Result	Opposition Result	Opposition Result	Rank
Dilara Bozan	Kata	—N/a	24.74 (1)	25.00 (1)	Sadeghi (IRI); W 25.74	1st place, gold medalist(s)
Zehra Kaya; Damla Pelit; Damla Su Türemen	Team kata	—N/a		22.94 (2)	Cameroon; W 21.00	3rd place, bronze medalist(s)
Serap Özçelik	Kumite −50 kg	Bye	Alajmi (UAE); W 4-1	Ouikene (ALG); L 0-2	Chandran (MAS); W 7-4	3rd place, bronze medalist(s)
Tuba Yakan	Kumite −55 kg	Bye	Yerdaulet (KAZ); W 3-2	Sadigova (AZE); W 4-1	Louiza (ALG); W 3-3	1st place, gold medalist(s)
Gülbahar Gözütok	Kumite −61 kg	Assanie (CHA); W 8-0	Kanay (KAZ); W 5-2	Chajai (MAR); W 2-0	Tursunalieva (UZB); L 1-4	2nd place, silver medalist(s)
Eda Eltemur	Kumite −68 kg	Jaber (JOR); W 0-0	Azlan (MAS); W 2-0	Heidari (IRI); L 3-8	Mekkaoui (ALG); W 7-7	3rd place, bronze medalist(s)
Meltem Hocaoğlu	Kumite +68 kg	Bye	Stella (CMR); W 4-2	Borjali (IRI); W 7-6	Berultseva (KAZ); L 1-3	2nd place, silver medalist(s)

== Handball ==
Summary

Team	Event	Group stage				Semifinal	Final / BM / Pl.	
Team	Event	Opposition Score	Opposition Score	Opposition Score	Rank	Opposition Score	Opposition Score	Rank
Turkey men's	Men's tournament	Iran; L 20–26	Azerbaijan; W 29–19	—N/a	2	Saudi Arabia; W 26–25	Qatar; L 23–26	2nd place, silver medalist(s)
Turkey women's	Women's tournament	Bangladesh; W 51–10	Senegal; W 34–23	Uzbekistan; W 42–29	1	Cameroon; W 34–23	Azerbaijan; W 30–24	1st place, gold medalist(s)

=== Men's tournament ===
Team roster

Team
- Hüseyin Bereket
- Enis Yatkın
- Hüseyin Bereket
- Enis Harun Hacıoğlu
- Baran Nalbantoğlu
- Fatih Çalkamış
- Sedat Yıldırım
- Gökay Bilim
- Atakan Şirin
- Eray Karakoç
- Durmuş Ali Tınkır
- Cemal Kütahya
- Doğukan Keser
- Şevket Yağmuroğlu
- Alper Aydın
- İlkan Keleşoğlu
Coach:Okan Halay

Group B

Pos	Team	Pld	W	D	L	GF	GA	GD	Pts	Qualification
1	Iran	2	2	0	0	68	40	+28	4	Semifinals
2	Turkey (H)	2	1	0	1	49	45	+4	2	Semifinals
3	Azerbaijan	2	0	0	2	39	71	−32	0	

Rules for classification: 1) Points; 2) Head-to-head points; 3) Head-to-head goal difference; 4) Head-to-head goals scored; 5) Goal difference; 6) Goals scored; 7) Draw.
(H) Hosts

8 August 2022; 15:00	Turkey	20–26	Iran	Selçuklu Municipality International Sports Hall, Selçuklu
8 August 2022; 15:00		(9–11)		Selçuklu Municipality International Sports Hall, Selçuklu

10 August 2022; 15:00	Azerbaijan	19–29	Turkey	Selçuklu Municipality International Sports Hall, Selçuklu
10 August 2022; 15:00		(9–11)		Selçuklu Municipality International Sports Hall, Selçuklu

Semifinal

13 August 2022; 15:00	Saudi Arabia	25–26	Turkey	Selçuklu Municipality International Sports Hall, Selçuklu
13 August 2022; 15:00		(15–16)		Selçuklu Municipality International Sports Hall, Selçuklu

Final

14 August 2022; 18:00	Turkey	23–26	Qatar	Selçuklu Municipality International Sports Hall, Selçuklu
14 August 2022; 18:00		(10–14)		Selçuklu Municipality International Sports Hall, Selçuklu

=== Women's tournament ===
Team roster

Team
- Merve Durdu
- Halime İslamoğlu
- Kübra Sarıkaya
- Elif Sıla Aydın
- Emine Gökdemir
- Bilge Nur Öztürk
- Neslihan Çalışkan
- Betül Yılmaz
- Ayşenur Sormaz
- Yasemin Şahin
- Gülcan Tügel
- Beyza Karaçam
- Merve Özbolluk
- Cansu Akalın
- Ceren Demirçelen
- Meryem Erdoğan
Coach: Costică Buceschi

Group A

Pos	Team	Pld	W	D	L	GF	GA	GD	Pts	Qualification
1	Turkey (H)	3	3	0	0	127	62	+65	6	Semifinals
2	Uzbekistan	3	2	0	1	99	89	+10	4	Semifinals
3	Senegal	3	1	0	2	95	87	+8	2	Fifth place game
4	Bangladesh	3	0	0	3	55	138	−83	0	Seventh place game

Rules for classification: 1) Points; 2) Head-to-head points; 3) Head-to-head goal difference; 4) Head-to-head goals scored; 5) Goal difference; 6) Goals scored; 7) Draw.
(H) Hosts

7 August 2022; 13:00	Bangladesh	10–51	Turkey	Selçuklu Municipality International Sports Hall, Selçuklu
7 August 2022; 13:00		(4–26)		Selçuklu Municipality International Sports Hall, Selçuklu

9 August 2022; 11:00	Senegal	23–34	Turkey	Selçuklu Municipality International Sports Hall, Selçuklu
9 August 2022; 11:00		(14–16)		Selçuklu Municipality International Sports Hall, Selçuklu

11 August 2022; 13:00	Turkey	42–29	Uzbekistan	Selçuklu Municipality International Sports Hall, Selçuklu
11 August 2022; 13:00		(23–14)		Selçuklu Municipality International Sports Hall, Selçuklu

Semifinal

13 August 2022; 11:00	Turkey	34–23	Cameroon	Selçuklu Municipality International Sports Hall, Selçuklu
13 August 2022; 11:00		(14–10)		Selçuklu Municipality International Sports Hall, Selçuklu

Final

14 August 2022; 15:00	Turkey	30–24	Azerbaijan	Selçuklu Municipality International Sports Hall, Selçuklu
14 August 2022; 15:00		(14–10)		Selçuklu Municipality International Sports Hall, Selçuklu

== Taekwondo ==
Men kyourugi

Athlete	Event	Round of 16	Quarterfinals	Semifinals	Final / BM	
Athlete	Event	Opposition Result	Opposition Result	Opposition Result	Opposition Result	Rank
Deniz Dağdelen	54 kg	Ayad (YEM); W	Alhammadi (UAE); W	Mousaei (IRI); W	Amadou (NIG); L	2nd place, silver medalist(s)
Görkem Polat	58 kg	Albdoe (SUD); W	Hamdi (KSA); W	Garba (NIG); W	Lotfi (MAR); L	2nd place, silver medalist(s)
Hakan Reçber	63 kg	Abu-Shakra (JOR); W	Abdirashev (KAZ); W	Dehghani (IRI); W 2-0	Wasfi (MAR); L 0-2	2nd place, silver medalist(s)
Ferhat Can Kavurat	68 kg	Ayyad (JOR); W 2-0	Dookhy (KSA); W 2-0	Rashitov (UZB); L 0-2	—N/a	3rd place, bronze medalist(s)
Muhammed Emin Yıldız	74 kg	Junior (CMR); W	Almuwallad (KSA); W	Bahlool (PLE); L	—N/a	3rd place, bronze medalist(s)
Hüseyin Kartal	80 kg	Bye	Mazhar (PAK); W	Almabrouk (KSA); W	Salaev (UZB); L	2nd place, silver medalist(s)
Enbiya Taha Biçer	87 kg	Bye	Beigi (AZE); W	Ahmadi (IRI); L 0-2	—N/a	3rd place, bronze medalist(s)
Emre Kutalmış Ateşli	+87 kg	Bye	Saeed (PAK); W 2-0	Nadalian (IRI); L 0-2	—N/a	3rd place, bronze medalist(s)

Women kyourugi

Athlete	Event	Round of 16	Quarterfinals	Semifinals	Final / BM	
Athlete	Event	Opposition Result	Opposition Result	Opposition Result	Opposition Result	Rank
Emine Göğebakan	46 kg	Bye	Tojimatova (UZB); L	Did not Advanced		8
Rukiye Yıldırım	49 kg	—N/a	Khusniddinova (UZB); W 2-0	Abakarova (AZE); W 2-0	Soltani (IRI); W 2-1	1st place, gold medalist(s)
Zeliha Ağrıs	53 kg	Hajiyeva (AZE); W	Maheswari (INA); W	El-Bouchti (MAR); L	—N/a	3rd place, bronze medalist(s)
Hatice Kübra İlgün	57 kg	Bye	Mirabzalova (UZB); W	Valizadeh (IRI); W 2-1	Laaraj (MAR); L 0-2	2nd place, silver medalist(s)
İkra Kayır	62 kg	Bye	Issina (KAZ); W	Mirnourollahi (IRI); L 0-2	—N/a	3rd place, bronze medalist(s)
Mervenur Evci	67 kg	Bye	Esmaeil (IRI); L 0-2	Did not Advanced		8
Sude Yaren Uzunçavdar	73 kg	—N/a	Pouresmaeilkarani (IRI); W 2-0	Deniz (KAZ); W 2-0	Ward (LBN); W 2-0	1st place, gold medalist(s)
Nafia Kuş	+73 kg	—N/a	Bye	Khodabandeh (IRI); L 1-2	—N/a	3rd place, bronze medalist(s)

== Volleyball ==
Summary

Team	Event	Group stage				Semifinal	Final / BM / Pl.	
Team	Event	Opposition Score	Opposition Score	Opposition Score	Rank	Opposition Score	Opposition Score	Rank
Turkey men's	Men's tournament	Pakistan; W 3-1	Qatar; L 1-3	Iran; W 3-2	2	Cameroon; L 1-3	Azerbaijan; W 3-1	3rd place, bronze medalist(s)
Turkey women's	Women's tournament	Uzbekistan; W 3-0	Iran; W 3-0	—N/a	1	Cameroon; W 3-0	Iran; W 3-0	1st place, gold medalist(s)

=== Men's tournament ===
Pool B

Pos	Team	Pld	W	L	Pts	SW	SL	SR	SPW	SPL	SPR	Qualification
1	Iran	3	2	1	7	8	3	2.667	265	243	1.091	Semifinals
2	Turkey (H)	3	2	1	5	7	6	1.167	315	317	0.994	Semifinals
3	Qatar	3	2	1	5	6	6	1.000	267	272	0.982	
4	Pakistan	3	0	3	1	3	8	0.375	282	297	0.949	

Source: TVF
(H) Host

Date	Time		Score		Set 1	Set 2	Set 3	Set 4	Set 5	Total	Report
9 Aug	19:00	Pakistan	1–3	Turkey	28–30	26–24	27–29	27–29		108–112	Report
11 Aug	16:00	Turkey	1–3	Qatar	25–22	21–25	24–26	14–25		84–98	Report
13 Aug	19:00	Turkey	3–2	Iran	23–25	22–25	34–32	25–21	15–8	119–111	Report

Semifinal

Date	Time		Score		Set 1	Set 2	Set 3	Set 4	Set 5	Total	Report
14 Aug	16:00	Cameroon	3–1	Turkey	25–23	25–18	22–25	25–20		97–86	Report

Bronze medal match

Date	Time		Score		Set 1	Set 2	Set 3	Set 4	Set 5	Total	Report
15 Aug	10:00	Turkey	3–1	Azerbaijan	26–24	22–25	28–26	25–14		101–89	Report

=== Women's tournament ===
Pool A

Pos	Team	Pld	W	L	Pts	SW	SL	SR	SPW	SPL	SPR	Qualification
1	Turkey (H)	2	2	0	6	6	0	MAX	150	83	1.807	Semifinals
2	Iran	2	1	1	3	3	4	0.750	153	150	1.020	Semifinals
3	Uzbekistan	2	0	2	0	1	6	0.167	106	176	0.602	

Source: TVF
(H) Host

Date	Time		Score		Set 1	Set 2	Set 3	Set 4	Set 5	Total	Report
8 Aug	19:00	Turkey	3–0	Uzbekistan	25–13	25–3	25–15			75–31	Report
12 Aug	19:00	Turkey	3–0	Iran	25–20	25–15	25–17			75–52	Report

Semifinal

Date	Time		Score		Set 1	Set 2	Set 3	Set 4	Set 5	Total	Report
14 Aug	19:00	Turkey	3–0	Cameroon	25–14	25–13	25–11			75–38	Report

Final

Date	Time		Score		Set 1	Set 2	Set 3	Set 4	Set 5	Total	Report
15 Aug	19:00	Turkey	3–0	Iran	25–16	25–14	25–15			75–45	Report

== Weightlifting ==
Men

Athlete	Event	Snatch		Clean & jerk		Total	Rank
Athlete	Event	Result	Rank	Result	Rank	Total	Rank
Muammer Şahin	55 kg	109	4	125	4	234	4
Ferdi Hardal	61 kg	122	3rd place, bronze medalist(s)	148	4	270	4
Kaan Kahriman	67 kg	138	3rd place, bronze medalist(s)	158	8	296	6
Yusuf Fehmi Genç	67 kg	131	6	174	1st place, gold medalist(s)	305	3rd place, bronze medalist(s)
Batuhan Yüksel	81 kg	151	6	170	10	321	8
Celil Erdoğdu	81 kg	153	5	186	5	339	5
Ulaşcan Kurnaz	89 kg	151	9	191	4	342	6
Hakan Kurnaz	89 kg	156	5	180	7	336	7
Onur Demirci	102 kg	152	9	181	9	333	9
Taner Çağlar	109 kg	145	7	180	7	325	7

Women

Athlete	Event	Snatch		Clean & jerk		Total	Rank
Athlete	Event	Result	Rank	Result	Rank	Total	Rank
Cansu Bektaş	45 kg	65	2nd place, silver medalist(s)	86	2nd place, silver medalist(s)	151	2nd place, silver medalist(s)
Şaziye Erdoğan	49 kg	77	2nd place, silver medalist(s)	93	2nd place, silver medalist(s)	170	2nd place, silver medalist(s)
Duygu Alıcı	49 kg	78	1st place, gold medalist(s)	94	1st place, gold medalist(s)	172	1st place, gold medalist(s)
Cansel Özkan	59 kg	88	3rd place, bronze medalist(s)	—N/a			DNF
Nuray Güngör	64 kg	97	2nd place, silver medalist(s)	121	1st place, gold medalist(s)	218	1st place, gold medalist(s)
Berfin Altun	64 kg	84	4	120	2nd place, silver medalist(s)	202	3rd place, bronze medalist(s)
Aysel Özkan	71 kg	95	2nd place, silver medalist(s)	121	1st place, gold medalist(s)	216	2nd place, silver medalist(s)
Dilara Uçan	76 kg	99	1st place, gold medalist(s)	121	3rd place, bronze medalist(s)	220	1st place, gold medalist(s)
Dilara Narin	81 kg	99	2nd place, silver medalist(s)	130	1st place, gold medalist(s)	229	1st place, gold medalist(s)
Melike Günal	+87 kg	109	4	130	4	239	4

== Wrestling ==
Men's freestyle

Athlete	Event	Round of 16	Quarterfinal	Semifinal	Repesaj	Final / BM	
Athlete	Event	Opposition Result	Opposition Result	Opposition Result	Opposition Result	Opposition Result	Rank
Şaban Kızıltaş	57 kg	Bay	Kalzhan (KAZ); L 3-9	Did not advance			8
Recep Topal	61 kg	Turobov (UZB); L 2-3	—N/a		Alibegov (BHR); W 3-1	Aburumaila (PLE); W 11-3	3rd place, bronze medalist(s)
Hamza Alaca	65 kg	Ghiasi (IRI); L 2-6	Did not advance				7
Cüneyt Budak	70 kg	Samuel (CHA); W 10-0	Otakhonov (UZB); L 3-6	Did not advance			8
Fazlı Eryılmaz	74 kg	Firouzpour (IRI); L 6-9	—N/a		Isakov (JOR); W 11-7	Kaipanov (KAZ); W 8-7	3rd place, bronze medalist(s)
Muhammet Akdeniz	79 kg	Eddine (ALG); W 10-0	Daghash (PLE); W 9-0	Abdurakhmonov (UZB); W 6-6	—N/a	Savadkouhi (IRI); L 6-12	2nd place, silver medalist(s)
Osman Göçen	86 kg	—N/a	Orazgylyjov (TKM); W 3-2	Abakarov (AZE); L 6-7	—N/a	Fayzullaev (UZB); W 11-6	3rd place, bronze medalist(s)
Erhan Yaylacı	92 kg	—N/a	Islomov (UZB); W 10-0	Chynybekov (KGZ); W 6-0	—N/a	Bazri (IRI); L 1-7	2nd place, silver medalist(s)
Mustafa Sessiz	97 kg	—N/a	Hemelyayev (TKM); W 8-1	Ibragimov (UZB); W 5-5	—N/a	Goleij (IRI); L 0-2	2nd place, silver medalist(s)

Athlete	Event	Group stage				Semifinal	Final / BM	
Athlete	Event	Opposition Result	Opposition Result	Opposition Result	Rank	Opposition Result	Opposition Result	Rank
Salim Ercan	125 kg	Saparov (TKM); W 11-0	Abdulrahman (QAT); W WO	—N/a	1	Rakhimov (UZB); W 14-4	Mehdi Hashemi (IRI); L 0-8	2nd place, silver medalist(s)

Men's Greco-Roman

Athlete	Event	Round of 16	Quarterfinal	Semifinal	Repesaj	Final / BM	
Athlete	Event	Opposition Result	Opposition Result	Opposition Result	Opposition Result	Opposition Result	Rank
Adem Uzun	55 kg	—N/a	Panahisani (IRI); L 0–7	Did not Advanced			8
Ayhan Karakuş	60 kg	Bay	Fergat (ALG); W 5-3	Mammadov (AZE); L 7-10	—N/a	Fidakhmetov (KAZ); W 6-2	3rd place, bronze medalist(s)
Abdurrahman Altan	63 kg	Bay	Açilow (TKM); L 1-4	Did not Advanced			7
Volkan Çakıl	67 kg	—N/a	Atabaev (UZB); L 5-7	Did not Advanced			7
Murat Dağ	72 kg	—N/a	Ganizade (AZE); L 1-10	—N/a		Konurbaev (KGZ); W 5-1	3rd place, bronze medalist(s)
Furkan Bayrak	77 kg	Hawsawi (KSA); W 8-0	Makhmudov (KGZ); L 0-9	—N/a		Vardanyan (UZB); W 9-0	3rd place, bronze medalist(s)
Emrah Kuş	82 kg	Kalen (KAZ); W 10-4	Khan (QAT); W 9-0	Huseynov (AZE); L 1-2	—N/a	Orazov (TKM); W 8-0	3rd place, bronze medalist(s)
Beytullah Kayışdağ	97 kg	Bay	Fallatah (KSA); W 10-0	Assakalov (UZB); L 1-2	—N/a	Safarov (TJK); W 8-0	3rd place, bronze medalist(s)

Athlete	Event	Group stage				Semifinal	Final / BM	
Athlete	Event	Opposition Result	Opposition Result	Opposition Result	Rank	Opposition Result	Opposition Result	Rank
Mehmet Ali Küçükosman	87 kg	Taheri (IRI); L 0-6	Berdimuratov (UZB); L 4-4	Ovelekov (TKM); W 8-0	3	Did not Advanced		5
Osman Yıldırım	130 kg	Yousefi (IRI); L 5-9	Kim (KGZ); W 5-0	—N/a	2	Shariati (AZE); W 3-1	Yousefi (IRI); L 2-3	2nd place, silver medalist(s)

Women's freestyle

Athlete	Event	Round of 16	Quarterfinal	Semifinal	Repesaj	Final / BM	
Athlete	Event	Opposition Result	Opposition Result	Opposition Result	Opposition Result	Opposition Result	Rank
Rahime Arı	53 kg	—N/a	Mim (BAN); W 10-0	Gurbanova (AZE); L 0-10	—N/a	Marimar (INA); W 6-2	3rd place, bronze medalist(s)
Merve Karadeniz	62 kg	—N/a	Goudiaby (SEN); L 1-6	Did not Advanced			8
Buse Tosun	72 kg	Ovlyakulyyeva (TKM); W 12-0	Bakbergenova (KAZ); W 2-1	Sambou (SEN); W 5-1	—N/a	Zutova (AZE); W 5-0	1st place, gold medalist(s)

Nordic Format

Athlete	Event	Nordic Round Robin				Rank
Athlete	Event	Opposition Result	Opposition Result	Opposition Result	Opposition Result	Rank
Zeynep Yetgil	55 kg	—N/a	Mammadova (AZE); W 3–2	Hammami (TUN); W 8–0	Akhmedova (UZB); W 3-1	1st place, gold medalist(s)
Elmas Çelik	59 kg	Adekuoroye (NGR); L 0–4	Bekesh (KAZ); L 0–2	Kolesnik (AZE); L 2–4	Aimbetova (UZB); W 5–2	4

Group stage Format

Athlete	Event	Group stage				Semifinal	Final / BM	
Athlete	Event	Opposition Result	Opposition Result	Opposition Result	Rank	Opposition Result	Opposition Result	Rank
Emine Çataloğlu	50 kg	—N/a	Ankicheva (KAZ); L 1–4	Stadnik (AZE); L 0–10	3	Did not Advanced		6
Elvira Kamaloğlu	57 kg	—N/a	Kolawole (NGR); L 0–10	Bousetta (TUN); W 8–4	2 Q	Aliyeva (AZE); L 6–9	Almagambetova (KAZ); W 6–0	3rd place, bronze medalist(s)
Yağmur Çakmak	65 kg	—N/a	Sazanova (KGZ); L 0–10	Ngolle (CMR); L 0–4	3	Did not Advanced		6
Aslı Demir	68 kg	Esbergenova (UZB); W 5–0	Zhumanazarova (KGZ); L 0–10	Akter (BAN); W 2–0	2 Q	Bakbergenova (KAZ); L 6–12	Egemberdiyeva (TKM); W 10–0	3rd place, bronze medalist(s)
Mehtap Gültekin	76 kg	—N/a	Zhanatayeva (KAZ); L 4–5	Zaripboeva (UZB); W 5–1	2 Q	Medet Kyzy (KGZ); L 0–10	Zhanatayeva (KAZ); W 7–1	3rd place, bronze medalist(s)
