= Taekwondo at the 2021 Islamic Solidarity Games – Men's +87 kg =

Taekwondo – Men's +87 kg at the 2021 Islamic Solidarity Games
- Venue: Selcuk University 19 Mayis Sport Hall
- Date: 11 August 2021
- Competitors: 13 from 13 nations

Medalists
| gold medal | Alireza Nadalian | Iran |
| silver medal | Ayoub Bassel | Morocco |
| bronze medal | Bauyrzhan Khassenov | Kazakhstan |
| bronze medal | Emre Kutalmış Ateşli | Turkey |

The men's +87 kg competition in taekwondo at the 2021 Islamic Solidarity Games was held on 11 August 2021 at the Selcuk University 19 Mayis Sport Hall in Konya.

== Results ==
Legend

- PTG — Won by Points Gap
- SUP — Won by superiority
- OT — Won on over time (Golden Point)
- DQ — Won by disqualification
- PUN — Won by punitive declaration
- WD — Won by withdrawal

=== Main Bracket ===
1/8 finals
Hamzah Omar Saeed (PAK)
Ali Akbar Amiri (AFG)
Shokhrukh Radjabov (UZB)
Anas Al-Azazi (JOR)
Islam Bazzar (PLE)
Alireza Nadalian (IRI) | KO
Wadhah Alahmed (QAT)
Rahy Ray (LBN)
Alasan Ann (GAM)
Bauyrzhan Khassenov (KAZ)

Quarterfinals
Emre Kutalmış Ateşli (TUR)
Hamzah Omar Saeed (PAK)
Shokhrukh Radjabov (UZB) | 0
Alireza Nadalian (IRI) | 2
Ayoub Bassel (MAR)
Rahy Ray (LBN)
Bauyrzhan Khassenov (KAZ)
Radik Isayev (AZE)

Semifinals
Emre Kutalmış Ateşli (TUR) | 0
Alireza Nadalian (IRI) | 2
Ayoub Bassel (MAR)
Bauyrzhan Khassenov (KAZ)

Final
Alireza Nadalian (IRI) | 2
Ayoub Bassel (MAR) | 0
