= Taekwondo at the 2021 Islamic Solidarity Games – Men's 63 kg =

Taekwondo – Men's 63 kg at the 2021 Islamic Solidarity Games
- Venue: Selcuk University 19 Mayis Sport Hall
- Date: 10 August
- Competitors: 19 from 19 nations

Medalists
gold medal	Abdelbasset Wasfi	Morocco
silver medal	Hakan Reçber	Turkey
bronze medal	Niyaz Pulatov	Uzbekistan
bronze medal	Mohammad Sadegh Dehghani	Iran

The men's 63 kg competition in taekwondo at the 2021 Islamic Solidarity Games was held on 10 August 2021 at the Selcuk University 19 Mayis Sport Hall in Konya.

== Results ==
Legend

- PTG — Won by Points Gap
- SUP — Won by superiority
- OT — Won on over time (Golden Point)
- DQ — Won by disqualification
- PUN — Won by punitive declaration
- WD — Won by withdrawal

=== Final ===
Final
Hakan Reçber (TUR)	0
Abdelbasset Wasfi (MAR)	2

=== Top half ===
Round of 32
Arnhem Jamal (SUR)
Ward Abu-Shakra (JOR)

Round of 16
Hakan Reçber (TUR)
Ward Abu-Shakra (JOR)
Muhammad Bassam Raihan (INA)
Sapargali Abdirashev (KAZ)
Hamad Almabrouk (KSA)	0
Mohammad Sadegh Dehghani (IRI)	2
Omar Hantoli (PLE)
Fares Boujemai (TUN)

Quarterfinals
Hakan Reçber (TUR)
Sapargali Abdirashev (KAZ)
Mohammad Sadegh Dehghani (IRI)	2
Omar Hantoli (PLE)	0

Semifinals
Hakan Reçber (TUR)	2
Mohammad Sadegh Dehghani (IRI)	0

=== Bottom half ===
Round of 32
Parviz Iskandarov (AZE)
Ahmaed Ali (COM)
Casimir Betel (CHA)
Eldar Kurmanaliev (KGZ)

Round of 16
Niyaz Pulatov (UZB)
Parviz Iskandarov (AZE)
Mahmadjon Sunatov (TJK)
Hikmatullah Zain (AFG)
Hneineh Ralph (LBN)
Asim Mohammed (SUD)
Eldar Kurmanaliev (KGZ)
Abdelbasset Wasfi (MAR)

Quarterfinals
Niyaz Pulatov (UZB)
Mahmadjon Sunatov (TJK)
Hneineh Ralph (LBN)
Abdelbasset Wasfi (MAR)

Semifinals
Niyaz Pulatov (UZB)	1
Abdelbasset Wasfi (MAR)	2
