= Taekwondo at the 2021 Islamic Solidarity Games – Men's 68 kg =

Taekwondo – Men's 68 kg at the 2021 Islamic Solidarity Games
- Venue: Selcuk University 19 Mayis Sport Hall
- Date: 10 August
- Competitors: 18 from 18 nations

Medalists
gold medal	Ulugbek Rashitov	Uzbekistan
silver medal	Javad Aghayev	Azerbaijan
bronze medal	Ferhat Can Kavurat	Turkey
bronze medal	Lo Mouhamadou Mansour	Senegal

The men's 68 kg competition in taekwondo at the 2021 Islamic Solidarity Games was held on 10 August 2021 at the Selcuk University 19 Mayis Sport Hall in Konya.

== Results ==
Legend

- PTG — Won by Points Gap
- SUP — Won by superiority
- OT — Won on over time (Golden Point)
- DQ — Won by disqualification
- PUN — Won by punitive declaration
- WD — Won by withdrawal

=== Final ===
Final
Ulugbek Rashitov (UZB)	2
Javad Aghayev (AZE)	0

=== Top half ===
Round of 32
Snip Jorano (SUR)
Faraj Yamen (LBN)

Round of 16
Ulugbek Rashitov (UZB)	2
Faraj Yamen (LBN)	0
Fofana Mohamed (MLI)	0
Danial Bozorgishoub (IRI)	2
Hasham Bin Dookhy (KSA)
Ahmad Nor Rakib (MAS)
Abdallah Ayyad (JOR)	0
Ferhat Can Kavurat (TUR)	2

Quarterfinals
Ulugbek Rashitov (UZB)	2
Danial Bozorgishoub (IRI)	0
Hasham Bin Dookhy (KSA)	0
Ferhat Can Kavurat (TUR)	2

Semifinals
Ulugbek Rashitov (UZB)	2
Ferhat Can Kavurat (TUR)	0

=== Bottom half ===
Round of 32
Orseld Shkalla (ALB)
Tomte Koulnodji (CHA)

Round of 16
Ibrahim Maaiga (BUR)
Yousif Ali (SUD)
Yessine El Barhoumi (TUN)
Lo Mouhamadou Mansour (SEN)
Eldar Birimbay (KAZ)
Fahid Abdelrazeq (PLE)
Orseld Shkalla (ALB)
Javad Aghayev (AZE)

Quarterfinals
Ibrahim Maaiga (BUR)
Lo Mouhamadou Mansour (SEN)
Eldar Birimbay (KAZ)
Javad Aghayev (AZE)

Semifinals
Lo Mouhamadou Mansour (SEN)	1
Javad Aghayev (AZE)	2
