= Taekwondo at the 2021 Islamic Solidarity Games – Men's 54 kg =

Taekwondo – Men's 54 kg at the 2021 Islamic Solidarity Games
- Venue: Selcuk University 19 Mayis Sport Hall
- Date: 9 August
- Competitors: 16 from 16 nations

Medalists
gold medal	Mahamadou Amadou	Niger
silver medal	Deniz Dağdelen	Turkey
bronze medal	Jasurbek Kluchov	Kazakhstan
bronze medal	Mehdi Haji Mousaei	Iran

The men's 54 kg competition in taekwondo at the 2021 Islamic Solidarity Games will held on 9 August at the Selcuk University 19 Mayis Sport Hall in Konya.

== Results ==
Legend

- PTG — Won by Points Gap
- SUP — Won by superiority
- OT — Won on over time (Golden Point)
- DQ — Won by disqualification
- PUN — Won by punitive declaration
- WD — Won by withdrawal

=== Main Bracket ===
1/8 finals
Deniz Dağdelen (TUR)
Nejad Ayad (YEM)
Ali Mohamed Alhammadi (UAE)
Yousef Alqallaf (KUW)
Loiy Ihmedan (JOR)
Gofa Barh Gofa (CHA)
Mahamadou Amadou (NIG)
Hamza El Hacham (MAR)
Alsamih Fahad Samih (KSA)
Jakhongir Khudayberdiev (UZB)
Jasurbek Kluchov (KAZ)
Sayyad Dadashov (AZE)
Ndiaye Baye Galass (SEN)
Sebastian Chuang Wan Tan (MAS)
Aidin Altybaev (KGZ)
Mehdi Haji Mousaei (IRI)

Quarterfinals
(25x17px)
(25x17px)
(25x17px)
(25x17px)
(25x17px)
(25x17px)
(25x17px)
(25x17px)

Semifinals
(25x17px)
(25x17px)
(25x17px)
(25x17px)

Final
