= Taekwondo at the 2021 Islamic Solidarity Games – Women's 49 kg =

Taekwondo – Women's 49 kg at the 2021 Islamic Solidarity Games
- Venue: Selcuk University 19 Mayis Sport Hall
- Date: 10 August
- Competitors: 9 from 9 nations

Medalists
gold medal	Rukiye Yıldırım	Turkey
silver medal	Ghazal Soltani	Iran
bronze medal	Patimat Abakarova	Azerbaijan
bronze medal	Nezha Elaasal	Morocco

The women's 49 kg competition in taekwondo at the 2021 Islamic Solidarity Games was held on 10 August 2021 at the Selcuk University 19 Mayis Sport Hall in Konya.

== Results ==
Legend

- PTG — Won by Points Gap
- SUP — Won by superiority
- OT — Won on over time (Golden Point)
- DQ — Won by disqualification
- PUN — Won by punitive declaration
- WD — Won by withdrawal

=== Main Bracket ===
1/8 finals
Zarnigor Khusniddinova (UZB)
Kaltham Al-Mutawah (QAT)

Quarterfinals
Rukiye Yıldırım (TUR)
(25x17px)
Farida Soumana (NIG)
Patimat Abakarova (AZE)
Ghazal Soltani (IRI)
Fateemah Khawar (PAK)
Jana Abdelrahim (JOR)
Nezha Elaasal (MAR)

Semifinals
Rukiye Yıldırım (TUR)	2
Patimat Abakarova (AZE)	0
Ghazal Soltani (IRI)	2
Nezha Elaasal (MAR)	0

Final
Rukiye Yıldırım (TUR)	2
Ghazal Soltani (IRI)	1
