= Taekwondo at the 2021 Islamic Solidarity Games – Women's 62 kg =

Taekwondo – Women's 62 kg at the 2021 Islamic Solidarity Games
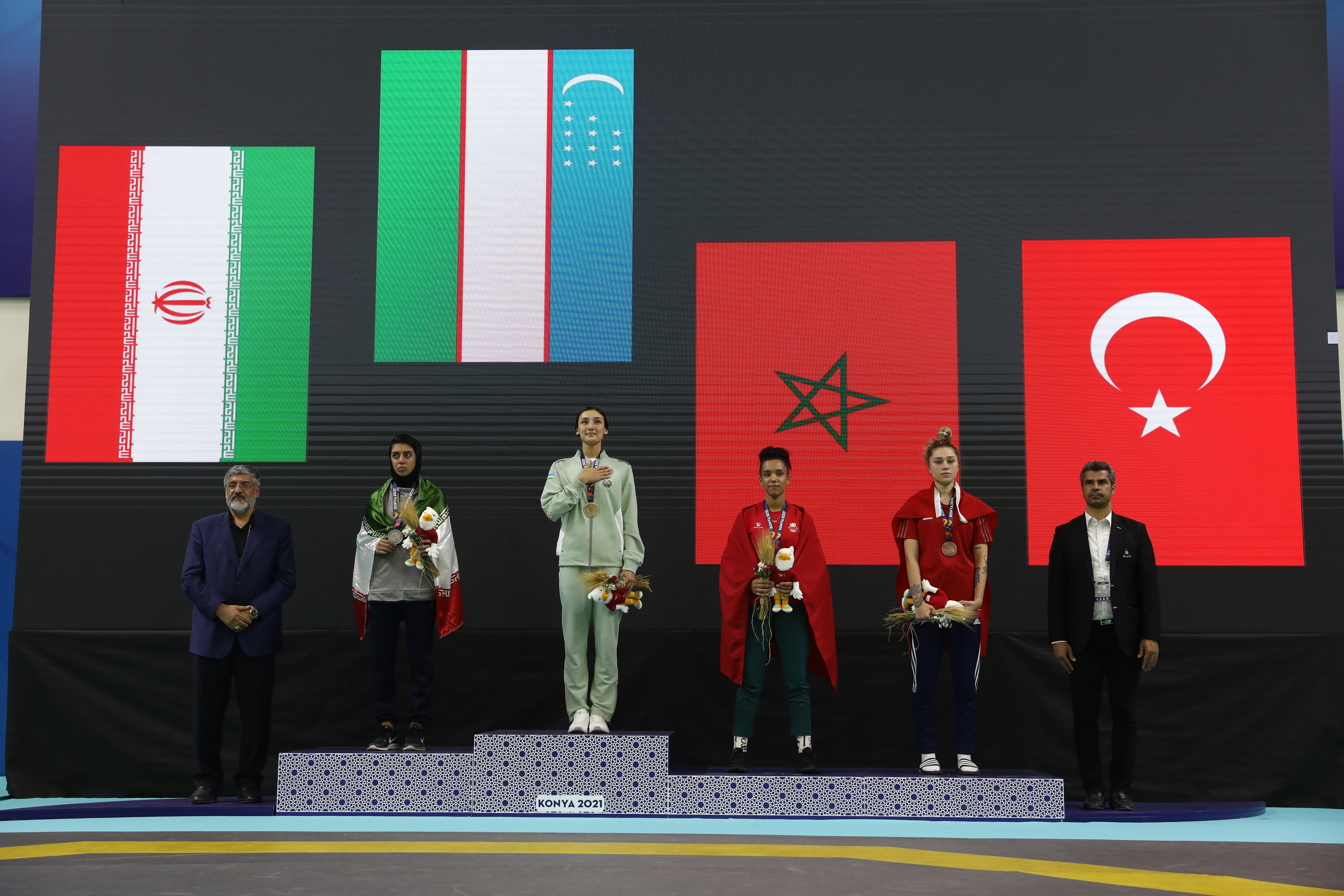
- Medal ceremony
- Venue: Selcuk University 19 Mayis Sport Hall
- Date: 12 August
- Competitors: 12 from 12 nations

Medalists
gold medal	Feruza Sadikova	Uzbekistan
silver medal	Seyedeh Narges Mirnourollahi	Iran
bronze medal	Khoulal Merieme	Morocco
bronze medal	İkra Kayır	Turkey

The women's 62 kg competition in taekwondo at the 2021 Islamic Solidarity Games will held on 12 August at the Selcuk University 19 Mayis Sport Hall in Konya.

== Results ==
Legend

- PTG — Won by Points Gap
- SUP — Won by superiority
- OT — Won on over time (Golden Point)
- DQ — Won by disqualification
- PUN — Won by punitive declaration
- WD — Won by withdrawal

=== Main Bracket ===
1/8 finals
Darin Faraj (PLE)
Len Al Rawashdeh (JOR)
Khoulal Merieme (MAR)
Fatima Majidova (AZE)
Lillian Akello (UGA)
Zhazira Issina (KAZ)
Tatiana Nancy (GAB)
Koutoubali Kajidja (CHA)

Quarterfinals
Feruza Sadikova (UZB)
Khoulal Merieme (MAR)
Khoulal Merieme (MAR)
Yacine Diaw (SEN)
İkra Kayır (TUR)
Zhazira Issina (KAZ)
Koutoubali Kajidja (CHA)	0
Seyedeh Narges Mirnourollahi (IRI)	2

Semifinals
Feruza Sadikova (UZB)
Khoulal Merieme (MAR)
İkra Kayır (TUR)	0
Seyedeh Narges Mirnourollahi (IRI)	2

Final
Feruza Sadikova (UZB)	2
Seyedeh Narges Mirnourollahi (IRI)	0
