= Taekwondo at the 2021 Islamic Solidarity Games – Men's 58 kg =

Taekwondo – Men's 58 kg at the 2021 Islamic Solidarity Games
- Venue: Selcuk University 19 Mayis Sport Hall
- Date: 9 August
- Competitors: 19 from 19 nations

Medalists
gold medal	Hossein Lotfi	Iran
silver medal	Görkem Polat	Turkey
bronze medal	Gashim Magomedov	Azerbaijan
bronze medal	Nouridine Issaka	Niger

The men's 58 kg competition in taekwondo at the 2021 Islamic Solidarity Games was held on 9 August 2021 at the Selcuk University 19 Mayis Sport Hall in Konya.

== Results ==
Legend

- PTG — Won by Points Gap
- SUP — Won by superiority
- OT — Won on over time (Golden Point)
- DQ — Won by disqualification
- PUN — Won by punitive declaration
- WD — Won by withdrawal

=== Final ===
Final
Görkem Polat (TUR)
Hossein Lotfi (IRI)

=== Top half ===
Round of 32
Cranima Wakurwoth (UGA)
Fu Cern Put Thai (MAS)

Round of 16
Omar Lakehal (MAR)
Fu Cern Put Thai (MAS)
Nouridine Issaka (NIG)
Khalifed Mark (LBN)
Mahmoud Altaryreh (JOR)
Riad Hamdi (KSA)
Mohamed Albdoe (SUD)
Görkem Polat (TUR)

Quarterfinals
Omar Lakehal (MAR)
Nouridine Issaka (NIG)
Riad Hamdi (KSA)
Görkem Polat (TUR)

Semifinals
Nouridine Issaka (NIG)
Görkem Polat (TUR)

=== Bottom half ===
Round of 32
Shihab Alarifi (YEM)
Mohamed Mushari (UAE)
Ben Younouss Konate (CIV)
Hossein Lotfi (IRI)

Round of 16
Gashim Magomedov (AZE)
Mohamed Mushari (UAE)
Abdulqader Asfoor (QAT)
Haroon Khan (PAK)
Samirkhon Ababakirov (KAZ)
Doniyor Makhkamov (UZB)
Hossein Lotfi (IRI)
Mohsen Rezaae (AFG)

Quarterfinals
Gashim Magomedov (AZE)
Haroon Khan (PAK)
Samirkhon Ababakirov (KAZ)
Hossein Lotfi (IRI)

Semifinals
Gashim Magomedov (AZE)
Hossein Lotfi (IRI)
