= Taekwondo at the 2021 Islamic Solidarity Games – Women's 67 kg =

Taekwondo – Women's 67 kg at the 2021 Islamic Solidarity Games
- Venue: Selcuk University 19 Mayis Sport Hall
- Date: 10 August
- Competitors: 10 from 10 nations

Medalists
gold medal	Farida Azizova	Azerbaijan
silver medal	Zeinab Esmaeil	Iran
bronze medal	Safia Salih	Morocco
bronze medal	Maram Fatnassi	Qatar

The women's 67 kg competition in taekwondo at the 2021 Islamic Solidarity Games will held on 10 August at the Selcuk University 19 Mayis Sport Hall in Konya.

== Results ==
Legend

- PTG — Won by Points Gap
- SUP — Won by superiority
- OT — Won on over time (Golden Point)
- DQ — Won by disqualification
- PUN — Won by punitive declaration
- WD — Won by withdrawal

=== Main Bracket ===
1/8 finals
Feruza Yergeshova (KAZ)
Silvana Lamanda (INA)
Zeinab Esmaeil (IRI)	2
Ozoda Sobirjonova (UZB)	0

Quarterfinals
Farida Azizova (AZE)
(25x17px)
Safia Salih (MAR)
Carla Boustany (LBN)
Maram Fatnassi (QAT)
Jwana Sadek (JOR)
Zeinab Esmaeil (IRI)	2
Mervenur Evci (TUR)	0

Semifinals
Farida Azizova (AZE)	2
Safia Salih (MAR)	0
Maram Fatnassi (QAT)	0
Zeinab Esmaeil (IRI)	2

Final
Farida Azizova (AZE)	2
Zeinab Esmaeil (IRI)	0
