= Taekwondo at the 2021 Islamic Solidarity Games – Men's 80 kg =

Taekwondo – Men's 80 kg at the 2021 Islamic Solidarity Games
- Venue: Selcuk University 19 Mayis Sport Hall
- Date: 11 August
- Competitors: 14 from 14 nations

Medalists
gold medal	Shukhrat Salaev	Uzbekistan
silver medal	Hüseyin Kartal	Turkey
bronze medal	Mehran Barkhordari	Iran
bronze medal	Ali Mabrouk Almabrouk	Saudi Arabia

The men's 80 kg competition in taekwondo at the 2021 Islamic Solidarity Games was held on 11 August 2022 at the Selcuk University 19 Mayis Sport Hall in Konya.

== Results ==
Legend

- PTG — Won by Points Gap
- SUP — Won by superiority
- OT — Won on over time (Golden Point)
- DQ — Won by disqualification
- PUN — Won by punitive declaration
- WD — Won by withdrawal

=== Main Bracket ===
1/8 finals
Taleh Suleymanov (AZE)
Akbar Aitakhunov (KGZ)
Rakhym Adilkhanov (KAZ)
Zaid Yasin (JOR)
Thierno Ibrahima Diallo (GUI)	0
Mehran Barkhordari (IRI)	2
Ababacar Sadikh Soumaré (SEN)
Samwel Kodi (SUD)
Muhammad Syafiq Zuber (MAS)
Ali Mabrouk Almabrouk (KSA)
Mbaiguinam Kalvin (CMR)
Abbas Mazhar (PAK)

Quarterfinals
Shukhrat Salaev (UZB)
Taleh Suleymanov (AZE)
Rakhym Adilkhanov (KAZ)	1
Mehran Barkhordari (IRI)	2
Ababacar Sadikh Soumaré (SEN)
Ali Mabrouk Almabrouk (KSA)
Abbas Mazhar (PAK)
Hüseyin Kartal (TUR)

Semifinals
Shukhrat Salaev (UZB)	2
Mehran Barkhordari (IRI)	1
Ali Mabrouk Almabrouk (KSA)
Hüseyin Kartal (TUR)

Final
Shukhrat Salaev (UZB)
Hüseyin Kartal (TUR)
