= Kickboxing at the 2021 Islamic Solidarity Games =

Kickboxing competition

- Venue: Selçuklu Municipality Sports Hall
- Dates: 16–18 August 2022
- Competitors: 180 from 15 nations

Kickboxing at the 2021 Islamic Solidarity Games was held in Konya, Turkey from 16 to 18 August 2022 in Selçuklu Municipality Sports Hall.

The Games were originally scheduled to take place from 20 to 29 August 2021 in Konya, Turkey. In May 2020, the Islamic Solidarity Sports Federation (ISSF), who are responsible for the direction and control of the Islamic Solidarity Games, postponed the games as the 2020 Summer Olympics were postponed to July and August 2021, due to the global COVID-19 pandemic.

== Medalists ==
=== Full contact ===
==== Men ====
Event	Gold	Silver	Bronze
−51 kg	Bedirhan Ersayar; Turkey	Aseed Al-Jaafreh; Jordan	Amil Mammadov; Azerbaijan
−51 kg	Bedirhan Ersayar; Turkey	Aseed Al-Jaafreh; Jordan	Sherali Musoev; Uzbekistan
−54 kg	Mavlonbek Muhammadjonov; Uzbekistan	Jamal Mammadov; Azerbaijan	Saad Aissaoui; Algeria
−54 kg	Mavlonbek Muhammadjonov; Uzbekistan	Jamal Mammadov; Azerbaijan	Omargeldi Nurgeldiýew; Turkmenistan
−60 kg	Seyit Battal Ay; Turkey	Muhyeddin Osama; Jordan	Ramiz Mammadov; Azerbaijan
−60 kg	Seyit Battal Ay; Turkey	Muhyeddin Osama; Jordan	Lazizbek Begmatov; Uzbekistan
−63.5 kg	Farid Aghamoghlanov; Azerbaijan	Oussama El-Hichou; Morocco	Aday Abuhasoah; Jordan
−63.5 kg	Farid Aghamoghlanov; Azerbaijan	Oussama El-Hichou; Morocco	Batyrkhan Kuandykov; Kazakhstan
−67 kg	Muhammed Süleyman Gülle; Turkey	Fakhriddin Eminov; Uzbekistan	Hamza Hattab; Algeria
−67 kg	Muhammed Süleyman Gülle; Turkey	Fakhriddin Eminov; Uzbekistan	Mohamed Yassine Mahssoun; Morocco
−71 kg	Maxat Ussip; Kazakhstan	Jamoliddin Nosirov; Uzbekistan	Mohannad Al-Silawy; Jordan
−71 kg	Maxat Ussip; Kazakhstan	Jamoliddin Nosirov; Uzbekistan	Elkhan Aliyev; Azerbaijan
−75 kg	Makhmud Khayotov; Uzbekistan	Sagi Salehli; Azerbaijan	Emre Yıldırım; Turkey
−75 kg	Makhmud Khayotov; Uzbekistan	Sagi Salehli; Azerbaijan	Salman Iothmanine; Morocco
−81 kg	Mahsum Teker; Turkey	Ali Khalaf Hasan; Jordan	Davlatbek Rayimjonov; Uzbekistan
−81 kg	Mahsum Teker; Turkey	Ali Khalaf Hasan; Jordan	Mazigh Ragueb; Algeria
−86 kg	Emrah Yaşar; Turkey	Elvin Aghayev; Azerbaijan	Hajymyrat Geldimämmedow; Turkmenistan
−86 kg	Emrah Yaşar; Turkey	Elvin Aghayev; Azerbaijan	Mukhammadyusuf Ganiev; Uzbekistan
−91 kg	Metin Yürük; Turkey	Jazzaa Al-Hussaini; Kuwait	Khasankhon Baratov; Uzbekistan
−91 kg	Metin Yürük; Turkey	Jazzaa Al-Hussaini; Kuwait	Ibrahim Boudik; Morocco

==== Women ====
Event	Gold	Silver	Bronze
−48 kg	Hayriye Türksoy Hançer; Turkey	Dhekra Bendaas; Algeria	Oumaima Belouarrat; Morocco
−48 kg	Hayriye Türksoy Hançer; Turkey	Dhekra Bendaas; Algeria	Gulsanam Akmaljonova; Uzbekistan
−52 kg	Emine Arslan; Turkey	Asmaa Er-Rakbi; Morocco	Shirinoy Zohidova; Uzbekistan
−52 kg	Emine Arslan; Turkey	Asmaa Er-Rakbi; Morocco	None awarded
−56 kg	Salma Ajebbour; Morocco	Ayşe Karaca; Turkey	Dilrabo Tairova; Uzbekistan
−56 kg	Salma Ajebbour; Morocco	Ayşe Karaca; Turkey	Diandra Ariesta Pieter; Indonesia
−60 kg	Rima Raihane; Morocco	Büşra Demirayak; Turkey	Munisa Koraboeva; Uzbekistan
−60 kg	Rima Raihane; Morocco	Büşra Demirayak; Turkey	None awarded
−65 kg	Gözde Nur Göktaş; Turkey	Makhliyo Abdumannobova; Uzbekistan	None awarded
−65 kg	Gözde Nur Göktaş; Turkey	Makhliyo Abdumannobova; Uzbekistan	None awarded
−70 kg	Sabriye Gür; Turkey	Robiya Kuchkarova; Uzbekistan	Saida Lahmidi; Morocco
−70 kg	Sabriye Gür; Turkey	Robiya Kuchkarova; Uzbekistan	None awarded

=== Low kick ===
==== Men ====
Event	Gold	Silver	Bronze
−51 kg	Nursultan Zhumabayev; Kazakhstan	Nazarbek Makhmudov; Uzbekistan	Salih Samet Oruç; Turkey
−51 kg	Nursultan Zhumabayev; Kazakhstan	Nazarbek Makhmudov; Uzbekistan	Mohammed Al-Saeedi; Yemen
−54 kg	Bilal Dural; Turkey	Atajan Atamyradow; Turkmenistan	Yahya Sabhi; Morocco
−54 kg	Bilal Dural; Turkey	Atajan Atamyradow; Turkmenistan	Olimjon Sultonov; Uzbekistan
−57 kg	Anar Mammadov; Azerbaijan	Hatip Emlek; Turkey	Nurdaulet Kalshora; Kazakhstan
−57 kg	Anar Mammadov; Azerbaijan	Hatip Emlek; Turkey	Aziz Biikhurov; Kyrgyzstan
−60 kg	Ali Ataberk Gürbüzcan; Turkey	Adilet Ulan Uulu; Kyrgyzstan	Houssemeddine Ahmed Yahia; Algeria
−60 kg	Ali Ataberk Gürbüzcan; Turkey	Adilet Ulan Uulu; Kyrgyzstan	Ibrahim Juma; Jordan
−63.5 kg	Berik Iskakov; Kazakhstan	Mehmet Zeki Kaya; Turkey	Hamza Hmidache; Morocco
−63.5 kg	Berik Iskakov; Kazakhstan	Mehmet Zeki Kaya; Turkey	Arzuman Gadimov; Azerbaijan
−67 kg	Alikhan Ozdoyev; Kazakhstan	Navruz Jumanazarov; Uzbekistan	Gasham Mammadov; Azerbaijan
−67 kg	Alikhan Ozdoyev; Kazakhstan	Navruz Jumanazarov; Uzbekistan	Muhammet Altybaýew; Turkmenistan
−71 kg	Aydın Aslan; Turkey	Rahim Aliyev; Azerbaijan	Abror Khakimov; Kyrgyzstan
−71 kg	Aydın Aslan; Turkey	Rahim Aliyev; Azerbaijan	Abdelali Zahidi; Morocco
−75 kg	Ünal Alkayış; Turkey	Ramal Aslanov; Azerbaijan	Bourenane; Algeria
−75 kg	Ünal Alkayış; Turkey	Ramal Aslanov; Azerbaijan	Youssef Assouik; Morocco
−81 kg	Serdar Mämmedow; Turkmenistan	Ruslan Stepanov; Kazakhstan	Fatih Erman; Turkey
−81 kg	Serdar Mämmedow; Turkmenistan	Ruslan Stepanov; Kazakhstan	Nurbek Urishboev; Uzbekistan
−86 kg	Ferhat Arslan; Turkey	Murodbek Azimov; Uzbekistan	Baybala Guliyev; Azerbaijan
−86 kg	Ferhat Arslan; Turkey	Murodbek Azimov; Uzbekistan	Samir Meziane; Algeria
+91 kg	Bahram Rajabzadeh; Azerbaijan	Kadir Yıldırım; Turkey	Khusankhon Baratov; Uzbekistan
+91 kg	Bahram Rajabzadeh; Azerbaijan	Kadir Yıldırım; Turkey	Mostafa Sharaf; Palestine

==== Women ====
Event	Gold	Silver	Bronze
−52 kg	Meriem El-Moubarik; Morocco	Seham Al-Kharif; Kuwait	Amanda La Loupatty; Indonesia
−52 kg	Meriem El-Moubarik; Morocco	Seham Al-Kharif; Kuwait	Zeliha Doğan; Turkey
−56 kg	Feyzanur Azizoğlu; Turkey	Romaysae Bouarourou; Morocco	Aysu Devrishova; Azerbaijan
−56 kg	Feyzanur Azizoğlu; Turkey	Romaysae Bouarourou; Morocco	Melaaz Ouali; Algeria
−60 kg	Kübra Kocakuş; Turkey	Oumaima Belharcha; Morocco	Dounia Mediouni; Algeria
−60 kg	Kübra Kocakuş; Turkey	Oumaima Belharcha; Morocco	Shara Khamzina; Kazakhstan
−65 kg	Bediha Tacyıldız; Turkey	Gülzada Jorakulyýewa; Turkmenistan	Chahinez Bouaïcha; Algeria
−65 kg	Bediha Tacyıldız; Turkey	Gülzada Jorakulyýewa; Turkmenistan	Reine Kévine Kengni; Cameroon

== Medal table ==
Rank	Nation	Gold	Silver	Bronze	Total
1	Turkey (TUR)	18	5	4	27
2	Kazakhstan (KAZ)	4	1	3	8
3	Azerbaijan (AZE)	3	5	7	15
4	Morocco (MAR)	3	4	9	16
5	Uzbekistan (UZB)	2	7	12	21
6	Turkmenistan (TKM)	1	2	3	6
7	Jordan (JOR)	0	3	3	6
8	Kuwait (KUW)	0	2	0	2
9	Algeria (ALG)	0	1	9	10
10	Kyrgyzstan (KGZ)	0	1	2	3
11	Indonesia (INA)	0	0	2	2
12	Cameroon (CMR)	0	0	1	1
12	Palestine (PLE)	0	0	1	1
12	Yemen (YEM)	0	0	1	1
Totals (14 entries)		31	31	57	119

== Participating nations ==
A total of 180 athletes from 15 nations competed in kickboxing at the 2021 Islamic Solidarity Games:

- Algeria (17)
- Azerbaijan (24)
- Cameroon (4)
- Indonesia (3)
- Jordan (8)
- Kazakhstan (13)
- Kuwait (4)
- Kyrgyzstan (5)
- Lebanon (1)
- Morocco (22)
- Palestine (3)
- Turkey (31)
- Turkmenistan (14)
- Uzbekistan (29)
- Yemen (2)
