= Taekwondo at the 2021 Islamic Solidarity Games – Women's 73 kg =

Taekwondo – Women's 73 kg at the 2021 Islamic Solidarity Games
- Venue: Selcuk University 19 Mayis Sport Hall
- Date: 11 August
- Competitors: 7 from 7 nations

Medalists
gold medal	Sude Yaren Uzunçavdar	Turkey
silver medal	Selman Ward	Lebanon
bronze medal	Cansel Deniz	Kazakhstan
bronze medal	Rama Abo-Alrub	Jordan

The women's 73 kg competition in taekwondo at the 2021 Islamic Solidarity Games will held on 11 August at the Selcuk University 19 Mayis Sport Hall in Konya.

== Results ==
Legend

- PTG — Won by Points Gap
- SUP — Won by superiority
- OT — Won on over time (Golden Point)
- DQ — Won by disqualification
- PUN — Won by punitive declaration
- WD — Won by withdrawal

=== Main Bracket ===
Quarterfinals
Zahra Pouresmaeilkarani (IRI)	0
Sude Yaren Uzunçavdar (TUR)	2
Selman Ward (LBN)
Maftuna Ergasheva (UZB)
Eldjouma Clemence (CHA)
Rama Abo-Alrub (JOR)

Semifinals
Cansel Deniz (KAZ)	0
Sude Yaren Uzunçavdar (TUR)	2
Selman Ward (LBN)
Rama Abo-Alrub (JOR)'

Final
Sude Yaren Uzunçavdar (TUR)	2
Selman Ward (LBN)	0
