= Taekwondo at the 2021 Islamic Solidarity Games – Men's 87 kg =

Taekwondo – Men's 87 kg at the 2021 Islamic Solidarity Games
- Venue: Selcuk University 19 Mayis Sport Hall
- Date: 11 August
- Competitors: 9 from 9 nations

Medalists
gold medal	Ali Ahmadi	Iran
silver medal	Fahed Sbeihi	Jordan
bronze medal	Enbiya Taha Biçer	Turkey
bronze medal	Tarek Moussalli	Lebanon

The men's 87 kg competition in taekwondo at the 2021 Islamic Solidarity Games was held on 11 August 2022 at the Selcuk University 19 Mayis Sport Hall in Konya.

== Results ==
Legend

- PTG — Won by Points Gap
- SUP — Won by superiority
- OT — Won on over time (Golden Point)
- DQ — Won by disqualification
- PUN — Won by punitive declaration
- WD — Won by withdrawal

=== Main Bracket ===
1/8 finals
Izaac Kodi (SUD)
Mederic Angaman (CIV)

Quarterfinals
Fahed Sbeihi (JOR)
Mederic Angaman (CIV)
Frederic Hongbe (CHA)
Tarek Moussalli (LBN)
Enbiya Taha Biçer (TUR)
Milad Beigi (AZE)
Ali Ahmadi (IRI)	2
Nikita Rafalovich (UZB)	0

Semifinals
Fahed Sbeihi (JOR)
Tarek Moussalli (LBN)
Enbiya Taha Biçer (TUR)	0
Ali Ahmadi (IRI)	2

Final
Fahed Sbeihi (JOR)	1
Ali Ahmadi (IRI)	2
