= Taekwondo at the 2021 Islamic Solidarity Games – Women's +73 kg =

Taekwondo – Women's +73 kg at the 2021 Islamic Solidarity Games
- Venue: Selcuk University 19 Mayis Sport Hall
- Date: 12 August
- Competitors: 6 from 6 nations

Medalists
| gold medal | Svetlana Osipova | Uzbekistan |
| silver medal | Akram Khodabandeh | Iran |
| bronze medal | Nafia Kuş | Turkey |
| bronze medal | Fatima-Ezzahra Aboufaras | Morocco |

The women's +73 kg competition in taekwondo at the 2021 Islamic Solidarity Games was held on 12 August 2021 at the Selcuk University 19 Mayis Sport Hall in Konya.

== Results ==
Legend

- PTG — Won by Points Gap
- SUP — Won by superiority
- OT — Won on over time (Golden Point)
- DQ — Won by disqualification
- PUN — Won by punitive declaration
- WD — Won by withdrawal

=== Main Bracket ===
| Quarterfinals | | Semifinals | | Final |
| | | Nafia Kuş (TUR) | 1 |
| Abu Alhaj Sarah (JOR) | 0 | Akram Khodabandeh (IRI) | 2 |
| Akram Khodabandeh (IRI) | 2 | | | Akram Khodabandeh (IRI) | 1 |
| Fatima-Ezzahra Aboufaras (MAR) | | | | Svetlana Osipova (UZB) | 2 |
| Soglo Veronique Sara (GAB) | | Fatima-Ezzahra Aboufaras (MAR) |
| | | Svetlana Osipova (UZB) |
