= Table tennis at the 2021 Islamic Solidarity Games =

Table tennis competition

- Venue: TÜYAP Konya International Fair Center
- Dates: 7–11 August 2022
- Competitors: 146 from 28 nations

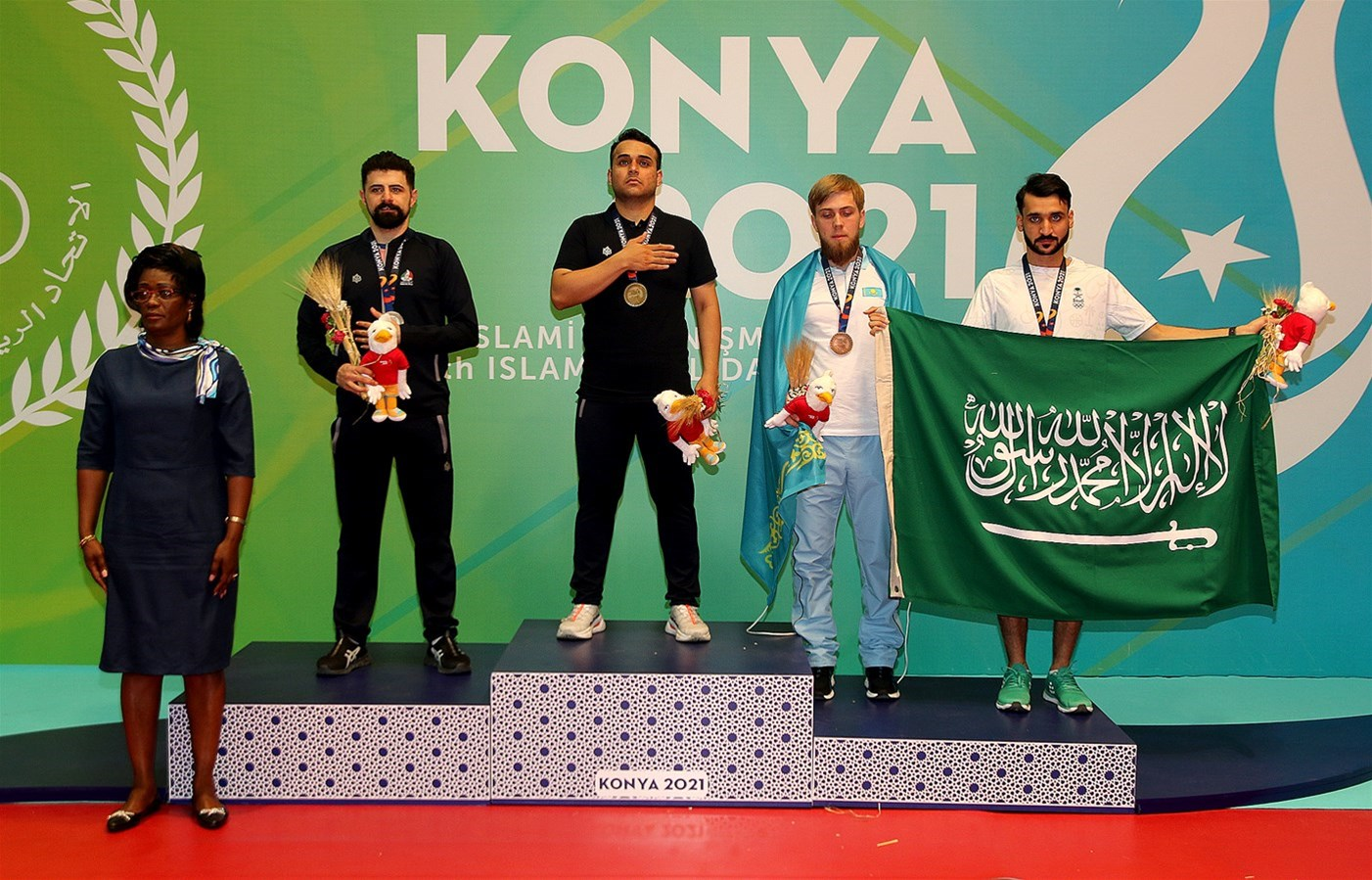
Individual Men medal ceremony

Table tennis at the 2021 Islamic Solidarity Games was held in Konya, Turkey from 7 to 11 August 2022 in TÜYAP Konya International Fair Center. Seeded players were based on ITTF 2021 Individual World Ranking and were approved by the Technical Delegates. Table Tennis Individual Competitions were held according to the elimination format, over 7 sets. All matches in Table Tennis Team categories were played over 5 sets. Para table tennis competitions were organized in KTO TUYAP Konya International Fair Center between 13 and 15 August 2022.

The Games were originally scheduled to take place from 20 to 29 August 2021 in Konya, Turkey. In May 2020, the Islamic Solidarity Sports Federation (ISSF), who are responsible for the direction and control of the Islamic Solidarity Games, postponed the games as the 2020 Summer Olympics were postponed to July and August 2021, due to the global COVID-19 pandemic.

== Medalists ==
Event	Gold	Silver	Bronze
Men's singles	Amir Hossein Hodaei; Iran	Nima Alamian; Iran	Denis Zholudev; Kazakhstan
Men's singles	Amir Hossein Hodaei; Iran	Nima Alamian; Iran	Ali Al-Khadrawi; Saudi Arabia
Men's team	Iran; Nima Alamian; Noshad Alamian; Amir Hossein Hodaei; Afshin Norouzi	Saudi Arabia; Ali Al-Khadrawi; Turki Almutairi; Khalid Alshareif	Turkey; İbrahim Gündüz; Tugay Şirzat Yılmaz; Abdullah Talha Yiğenler
Men's team	Iran; Nima Alamian; Noshad Alamian; Amir Hossein Hodaei; Afshin Norouzi	Saudi Arabia; Ali Al-Khadrawi; Turki Almutairi; Khalid Alshareif	Yemen; Magd Aldhubhani; Omar Ahmed Ali; Abdulrahman Alyafaee
Women's singles	Özge Yılmaz; Turkey	Neda Shahsavari; Iran	Sibel Altınkaya; Turkey
Women's singles	Özge Yılmaz; Turkey	Neda Shahsavari; Iran	Sarah Mathilde Nana; Cameroon
Women's team	Iran; Mahshid Ashtari; Parinaz Hajiloo; Shima Safaei; Neda Shahsavari	Turkey; Sibel Altınkaya; Özge Yılmaz; Simay Kulakçeken	Maldives; Fathimath Dheema Ali; Malaak Binthi Muizzu; Aishath Rafa Nazim
Women's team	Iran; Mahshid Ashtari; Parinaz Hajiloo; Shima Safaei; Neda Shahsavari	Turkey; Sibel Altınkaya; Özge Yılmaz; Simay Kulakçeken	Uzbekistan; Rozalina Khadjieva; Sugdiyona Madalieva; Markhabo Magdieva

== Medal table ==
Rank	Nation	Gold	Silver	Bronze	Total
1	Iran (IRI)	3	2	0	5
2	Turkey (TUR)	1	1	2	4
3	Saudi Arabia (KSA)	0	1	1	2
4	Cameroon (CMR)	0	0	1	1
4	Kazakhstan (KAZ)	0	0	1	1
4	Maldives (MDV)	0	0	1	1
4	Uzbekistan (UZB)	0	0	1	1
4	Yemen (YEM)	0	0	1	1
Totals (8 entries)		4	4	8	16

== Para table tennis ==
=== Medalists ===
Event	Gold	Silver	Bronze
Men's singles Class 4	Nesim Turan; Turkey	Abdullah Öztürk; Turkey	Amin Sadeghian; Iran
Men's singles Class 4	Nesim Turan; Turkey	Abdullah Öztürk; Turkey	Hamid Reza Sheikhzadeh; Iran
Men's singles Class 5	Ali Öztürk; Turkey	Hamza Çalışkan; Turkey	Javad Fouladi; Iran
Men's singles Class 5	Ali Öztürk; Turkey	Hamza Çalışkan; Turkey	Mehdi Masoumi; Iran
Men's team Class 4	Turkey; Abdullah Öztürk; Nesim Turan; Süleyman Vural	Iran; Amin Sadeghian; Hamid Reza Sheikhzadeh	Pakistan / Uzbekistan; Altaf-Ur-Rehman; Rasul Atamuratov
Men's team Class 4	Turkey; Abdullah Öztürk; Nesim Turan; Süleyman Vural	Iran; Amin Sadeghian; Hamid Reza Sheikhzadeh	None awarded
Men's team Class 5	Turkey; Hamza Çalışkan; Ali Öztürk; Ahmet Nihat Yıldırım	Iran; Javad Fouladi; Mehdi Masoumi	Palestine; Khaled Al-Fararja; Maher Naqib
Men's team Class 5	Turkey; Hamza Çalışkan; Ali Öztürk; Ahmet Nihat Yıldırım	Iran; Javad Fouladi; Mehdi Masoumi	None awarded
Women's singles Class 9	Neslihan Kavas; Turkey	Ekaterina Ishchenko; Tajikistan	Pegah Kalahroudi; Iran
Women's singles Class 9	Neslihan Kavas; Turkey	Ekaterina Ishchenko; Tajikistan	None awarded
Women's singles Class 10	Merve Cansu Demir; Turkey	Fatemeh Mohammadi; Iran	Ümran Ertiş; Turkey
Women's singles Class 10	Merve Cansu Demir; Turkey	Fatemeh Mohammadi; Iran	None awarded
Women's team Class 9–10	Turkey; Merve Cansu Demir; Ümran Ertiş; Neslihan Kavas	Iran; Fatemeh Etesaminia; Fatemeh Mohammadi	Azerbaijan / Tajikistan; Dinara Suncheleyeva; Ekaterina Ishchenko
Women's team Class 9–10	Turkey; Merve Cansu Demir; Ümran Ertiş; Neslihan Kavas	Iran; Fatemeh Etesaminia; Fatemeh Mohammadi	None awarded

=== Medal table ===
Rank	Nation	Gold	Silver	Bronze	Total
1	Turkey (TUR)	7	2	1	10
2	Iran (IRI)	0	4	5	9
3	Tajikistan (TJK)	0	1	1	2
4	Azerbaijan (AZE)	0	0	1	1
4	Pakistan (PAK)	0	0	1	1
4	Palestine (PLE)	0	0	1	1
4	Uzbekistan (UZB)	0	0	1	1
Totals (7 entries)		7	7	11	25

== Participating nations ==
=== Table tennis ===
110 athletes from 25 countries participated:

1. Albania (2)
2. Azerbaijan (8)
3. Bangladesh (7)
4. Benin (1)
5. Cameroon (2)
6. Comoros (1)
7. Djibouti (4)
8. Guyana (6)
9. Indonesia (6)
10. Iran (8)
11. Kazakhstan (3)
12. Kuwait (4)
13. Kyrgyzstan (3)
14. Lebanon (3)
15. Maldives (8)
16. Mauritania (2)
17. Pakistan (5)
18. Saudi Arabia (4)
19. Senegal (3)
20. Tajikistan (8)
21. Togo (2)
22. Uganda (6)
23. Uzbekistan (4)
24. Yemen (4)
25. Turkey (6)

=== Para table tennis ===
A total of 28 athletes from 9 nations competed in para table tennis at the 2021 Islamic Solidarity Games:

- Algeria (4)
- Azerbaijan (1)
- Iran (8)
- Pakistan (1)
- Palestine (2)
- Tajikistan (1)
- The Gambia (1)
- Turkey (9)
- Uzbekistan (1)
