= Lebanon at the Islamic Solidarity Games =

- IOC code: LBN
- NOC: Lebanese Olympic Committee
- Medals Ranked 46th: Gold 0 Silver 1 Bronze 9 Total 10

Islamic Solidarity Games appearances (overview)
- 2005; 2013; 2017; 2021; 2025

Lebanon has taken part in every edition of the Islamic Solidarity Games since the first tournament held in Mecca, 2005. By 2025, data from the Islamic Solidarity Sports Federation shows that Lebanese competitors have secured 10 medals in total — including 1 silver, and 9 bronze but still with no gold medal yet. Overall, the Lebanese holds the top 46th position in the medal table as off the last Islamic Solidarity Games held in Riyadh, Saudi Arabia.

== Medal tables ==
=== Medals by Islamic Solidarity Games ===
Host nation

Below is the table representing all Lebanese medals in the games. Until now, Lebanon has won 10 medals ( 1 silver, and 9 bronze).

Games	Athletes	Gold	Silver	Bronze	Total	Rank	Notes	RF
(Saudi Arabia) 2005 Mecca		0	0	0	0	-	details	
(Iran) 2010 Tehran	Canceled							
(Indonesia) 2013 Palembang		0	0	1	1	27th	details	
(Azerbaijan) 2017 Baku		0	0	1	1	40th	details	
(Turkey) 2021 Konya		0	1	3	4	32nd	details	
(Saudi Arabia) 2025 Riyadh		0	0	4	4	36th	details	
(Malaysia) 2029 Selangor	Future event							
Total		0	1	9	10	46th	-	-

== See also ==
- Lebanon at the Olympics
- Lebanon at the Paralympics
- Lebanon at the Asian Games
- Lebanon at the Arab Games
- Lebanon at the Mediterranean Games
- Sports in Lebanon
