= Hamza Çalışkan =

Turkish para table tennis player

Personal information
- Nationality: Turkish
- Born: 13 November 1994 (age 31) Konya, Turkey

Sport
- Country: Turkey
- Sport: Para table tennis
Medal record
Men's para table tennis (class 5)
Representing Turkey
World Championships
Silver medal – second place	2017 Bratislava	Team C5
European Championships
Gold medal – first place	2019 Helsingborg	Team C5
Bronze medal – third place	2017 Laško	Team C5
Islamic Solidarity Games
Gold medal – first place	2021 Konya	Team C5
Silver medal – second place	2021 Konya	Singles C5

Hamza Çalışkan (born 13 November 1994) is a Turkish Paralympian para table tennis player of class 5. A graduate of Selçuk University, he serves also as a coach. He resides in Konya in Turkey.

He is taking part in the 2020 Summer Paralympics.
