= Enbiya Taha Biçer =

Turkish taekwondo practitioner

Personal information
- Born: 25 April 2001 (age 25) Yozgat, Turkey
- Education: Gazi University
- Height: 202 cm (6 ft 8 in)
- Weight: 87 kg (192 lb)

Sport
- Country: Turkey
- Sport: Taekwondo
Medal record
Representing Turkey
Men's taekwondo
European Championships
Gold medal – first place	2024 Belgrade	87 kg
Bronze medal – third place	2022 Manchester	87 kg
Islamic Solidarity Games
Bronze medal – third place	2021 Konya	87 kg

Enbiya Taha Biçer (born 25 April 2001) is a Turkish taekwondo athlete. He won the gold medal at the 2024 European Taekwondo Championships.

== Career ==
In 2022, Enbiya Taha Biçer won one of the bronze medals in -87 kg at the 2022 European Taekwondo Championships held in Manchester, England. He won the bronze medal in the men's -87 kg category at the 5th Islamic Solidarity Games held at the Selçuk University 19 Mayıs Sports Hall in Konya.

He won the gold medal by defeating Richard Ordemann of Norway in the final match in the men's 87 kg category at the 2024 European Taekwondo Championships in Belgrade, Serbia. He reached the final by defeating Iranian Kasra Mehdipournejad, who competed on behalf of the Refugee Team in the second round, Spanish Sergio Troitiño in the quarterfinals and Greek Vasileios Tholiotis in the semifinals.
