= Ghazal Soltani =

Iranian taekwondo athlete (born 2003)

Personal information
- Full name: Ghazal Soltani Bandarjani
- Nationality: Iranian
- Born: March 5, 2003 (age 23) Semnan, Iran

Sport
- Country: Iran
- Sport: Taekwondo
- Weight class: 53 Kg
- Coached by: Mahrouz Saei (National Team)
Medal record
Women's Taekwondo
Representing Iran
Asian Championships
Bronze medal – third place	2021 Beirut	53 kg
Islamic Solidarity Games
Silver medal – second place	2021 Konya	49 kg
Asian Junior Championships
Gold medal – first place	2019 Amman	52 kg
World Cadet Championships
Gold medal – first place	2017 Sharm El Sheikh	47 kg
Asian Cadet Championships
Gold medal – first place	2017 Hochimineh	47 kg

Ghazal Soltani (Persian: غزل سلطانی ; born March 5, 2003 In Semnan) is an Iranian Taekwondo athlete. She won a bronze medal at the 2021 Asian Championships in the Women's 53 kg Weight Class.
