= Hüseyin Kartal (taekwondo) =

Turkish taekwondo practitioner

Personal information
- Born: 20 March 2000 (age 26) Turkey
- Height: 189 cm (6 ft 2 in)
- Weight: 80 kg (176 lb)

Sport
- Country: Turkey
- Sport: Taekwondo
- Event: 80 kg
- Club: Istanbul BB SK
- Coached by: Servet Tazegül, Yakup Kartal
Medal record
Representing Turkey
Taekwondo
European Games
Bronze medal – third place	2023 Kraków	80 kg
Islamic Solidarity Games
Silver medal – second place	2021 Konya	80 kg
European Junior Championships
Bronze medal – third place	2019 Helsingborg	80 kg
World Cadet Championships
Bronze medal – third place	2014 Baku	61 kg

Hüseyin Kartal (born 20 March 2000) is a Turkish taekwondo athlete.

== Career ==
He won the gold medal in the men's 80 kg category at the 2022 Turkish Taekwondo Championship held at the Selçuklu Municipality International Sports Hall in Konya. He won the silver medal at the 5th Islamic Solidarity Games held at the Selçuk University 19 Mayıs Sports Hall in Konya, losing to Uzbek rival Shukhrat Salaev in the men's 80 kg final.

Hüseyin Kartal defeated his French rival Ismael Bouzid Souihilli in the last 16 round and Richard Andre Ordemann of Norway in the quarterfinals at the 3rd European Games held at Krynica-Zdrój Arena in Kraków, Poland. Having qualified for the repechage after the Norwegian athlete reached the final, Hüseyin won the bronze medal by defeating first Adam Jochman from Czechia and then Jon Andoni Cintado Arteche from Spain.
