= Palestine at the 2021 Islamic Solidarity Games =

- IOC code: PLE
- NOC: Palestine Olympic Committee

in Konya, Turkey
- Competitors: 32
- Medals: Gold 0 Silver 1 Bronze 2 Total 3

Islamic Solidarity Games appearances
- 2005; 2013; 2017; 2021; 2025

Palestine participated in the 2021 Islamic Solidarity Games held in Konya, Turkey from 9 to 18 August 2022.

The games had been rescheduled several times. In May 2021, the ISSF postponed the event to August 2022 citing the COVID-19 pandemic situation in the participating countries.

== Medalists ==
Medal	Name	Sport	Event	Date
Silver	Ahmad Bahlool	Taekwondo	Men's 74 kg	12 August
Bronze	Khaled Shaaban; Maher Al-Naqeeb	Para table tennis	Men's Team Class 5	15 August
Bronze	Mostafa Sharif	Kickboxing	Men's +91kg	17 August

Medals by sport
Sport	1st place, gold medalist(s)	2nd place, silver medalist(s)	3rd place, bronze medalist(s)	Total
Kickboxing	0	0	1	1
Para Table tennis	0	0	1	1
Taekwondo	0	1	0	1
Total	0	1	2	3

=== Men's 3x3 tournament ===
Group A

Pos	Team	Pld	W	L	PF	PA	PD	Qualification
1	Senegal	3	3	0	51	34	+17	Quarterfinals
2	Jordan	3	1	2	46	47	−1	Quarterfinals
3	Qatar	3	1	2	45	46	−1	
4	Palestine	3	1	2	41	56	−15	

Source: Konya 2021
Rules for classification: 1) Wins; 2) Head-to-head record; 3) Points scored.

13 August

Report

Palestine	12–21	Qatar

Karatay Congress and Sport Center, Konya

13 August

Report

Senegal	21–13	Palestine

Karatay Congress and Sport Center, Konya

15 August

Report

Jordan	14–16	Palestine

Karatay Congress and Sport Center Konya

== Wrestling ==
Men's freestyle

Athlete	Event	Round of 16	Quarterfinal	Semifinal	Repesaj	Final / BM	
Athlete	Event	Opposition Result	Opposition Result	Opposition Result	Opposition Result	Opposition Result	Rank
Ali Aburumaila	61 kg	Bay	Abdelhak (ALG); W 15–5	Turobov (UZB); L 0–11	—N/a	Topal (TUR); L 3–11	5
Malik Daghash	79 kg	Bay	Akdeniz (TUR); L 0–9	—N/a	Eddine (ALG); L 0–10	—N/a	12
