= Cameroon at the 2021 Islamic Solidarity Games =

- IOC code: CMR
- NOC: Cameroon Olympic and Sports Committee

in Konya, Turkey
- Competitors: 139
- Medals: Gold 2 Silver 6 Bronze 5 Total 13

Islamic Solidarity Games appearances
- 2005; 2013; 2017; 2021; 2025

Cameroon participated in the 2021 Islamic Solidarity Games held in Konya, Turkey from 9 to 18 August 2022.

The games had been rescheduled several times. In May 2021, the ISSF postponed the event to August 2022 citing the COVID-19 pandemic situation in the participating countries.

== Medalists ==
Medal	Name	Sport	Event	Date

Medals by sport
Sport	1st place, gold medalist(s)	2nd place, silver medalist(s)	3rd place, bronze medalist(s)	Total
Archery	0	0	0	0
Athletics	1	0	2	3
Handball	0	0	1	1
Judo	0	1	0	1
Swimming	0	1	0	1
Table tennis	0	0	1	1
Volleyball	0	1	0	1
Weightlifting	1	3	1	5
Total	2	6	5	13

== Football ==
Summary

Team	Event	Group stage				Semifinal	Final / BM	
Team	Event	Opposition Score	Opposition Score	Opposition Score	Rank	Opposition Score	Opposition Score	Rank
Cameroon U-23 men's	Men's tournament	Turkey	Algeria	Senegal	4	did not advance		7

Group A

Pos	Team	Pld	W	D	L	GF	GA	GD	Pts	Qualification
1	Turkey (H)	3	2	1	0	5	3	+2	7	Advance to knockout stage
2	Algeria	3	1	2	0	5	2	+3	5	Advance to knockout stage
3	Senegal	3	1	1	1	3	2	+1	4	
4	Cameroon	3	0	0	3	2	8	−6	0	

(H) Hosts
8 August 2022
12:30

Algeria	3–0 (w/o)	Cameroon

Konya
10 August 2022
12:30

Turkey	3–2	Cameroon
Karadağ 45'; Aydın 60'; Sanuç 80'		Marou 24'; Wassou 85'

Konya
12 August 2022
12:30

Cameroon	0–2	Senegal
		Diagne 32', 65'

Konya

== Handball ==
=== Women's tournament ===
Summary

Team	Event	Group stage			Semifinal	Final / BM		
Team	Event	Opposition Score	Opposition Score	Opposition Score	Rank	Opposition Score	Opposition Score	Rank
Cameroon women's	Women's tournament	Azerbaijan; L 0–10	Iran; W 42–29	Afghanistan; W 10–0	2 Q	Turkey; L 23–34	Uzbekistan; W 40–27	3rd place, bronze medalist(s)

Group B

Pos	Team	Pld	W	D	L	GF	GA	GD	Pts	Qualification
1	Azerbaijan	3	3	0	0	79	26	+53	6	Semifinals
2	Cameroon	3	2	0	1	52	39	+13	4	Semifinals
3	Iran	3	1	0	2	89	74	+15	2	Fifth place game
4	Afghanistan	3	0	0	3	15	96	−81	0	Seventh place game

Rules for classification: 1) Points; 2) Head-to-head points; 3) Head-to-head goal difference; 4) Head-to-head goals scored; 5) Goal difference; 6) Goals scored; 7) Draw.

Cancelled	Cameroon	0–10	Azerbaijan	Selçuklu Municipality International Sports Hall, Selçuklu

9 August 2022; 15:00	Cameroon	42–29	Iran	Selçuklu Municipality International Sports Hall, Selçuklu

11 August 2022; 15:00	Cameroon	10–0	Afghanistan	Selçuklu Municipality International Sports Hall, Selçuklu

Semifinal

13 August 2022; 11:00	Turkey	34–23	Cameroon	Selçuklu Municipality International Sports Hall, Selçuklu
13 August 2022; 11:00		(14–10)		Selçuklu Municipality International Sports Hall, Selçuklu

Bronze medal game

14 August 2022; 13:00	Cameroon	40–27	Uzbekistan	Selçuklu Municipality International Sports Hall, Selçuklu

== Volleyball ==
=== Men's tournament ===
Pool A

Pos	Team	Pld	W	L	Pts	SW	SL	SR	SPW	SPL	SPR	Qualification
1	Cameroon	3	2	1	7	8	3	2.667	255	220	1.159	Semifinals
2	Azerbaijan	3	2	1	6	6	4	1.500	232	220	1.055	Semifinals
3	Morocco	3	2	1	5	7	5	1.400	272	246	1.106	
4	Sudan	3	0	3	0	0	9	0.000	152	225	0.676	

Source: TVF

Date	Time		Score		Set 1	Set 2	Set 3	Set 4	Set 5	Total	Report
9 Aug	15:00	Morocco	3–2	Cameroon	25–20	24–26	18–25	25–22	15–12	107–105	Report
11 Aug	19:00	Azerbaijan	0–3	Cameroon	19–25	23–25	15–25			57–75	Report
13 Aug	10:00	Sudan	0–3	Cameroon	17–25	22–25	17–25			56–75	Report

Semifinal

Date	Time		Score		Set 1	Set 2	Set 3	Set 4	Set 5	Total	Report
14 Aug	16:00	Cameroon	3–1	Turkey	25–23	25–18	22–25	25–20		97–86	Report

Gold medal match

Date	Time		Score		Set 1	Set 2	Set 3	Set 4	Set 5	Total	Report
15 Aug	16:00	Cameroon	1–3	Iran	16–25	25–18	23–25	14–25		78–93	Report

=== Women's tournament ===
Pool B

Prelimanary round

Pos	Team	Pld	W	L	Pts	SW	SL	SR	SPW	SPL	SPR	Qualification
1	Azerbaijan	3	3	0	9	9	1	9.000	257	119	2.160	Semifinals
2	Cameroon	3	2	1	6	7	3	2.333	227	189	1.201	Semifinals
3	Senegal	3	1	2	3	3	6	0.500	142	189	0.751	
4	Afghanistan	3	0	3	0	0	9	0.000	96	225	0.427	

Source: TVF

Date	Time		Score		Set 1	Set 2	Set 3	Set 4	Set 5	Total	Report
9 August	14:30	Afghanistan	0–3	Cameroon	16–25	7–25	15–25			38–75	
10 August	19:00	Senegal	0–3	Cameroon	16–25	17–25	11–25			44–75	
12 August	13:00	Cameroon	1–3	Azerbaijan	31–29	12–25	8–25	26–28		77–107	

Semifinal

Date	Time		Score		Set 1	Set 2	Set 3	Set 4	Set 5	Total	Report
14 Aug	19:00	Turkey	3–0	Cameroon	25–14	25–13	25–11			75–38	Report

Bronze medal match

Date	Time		Score		Set 1	Set 2	Set 3	Set 4	Set 5	Total	Report
15 Aug	13:00	Cameroon	0–3	Azerbaijan	25–27	13–25	17–25			55–77	Report

== Weightlifting ==
Results

Athlete	Event	Snatch		Clean & Jerk		Total	Result
Athlete	Event	Result	Rank	Result	Rank	Total	Result
Ngongang Tchuissi Guy Michel	Men's -81kg	134	12	167	11	301	11
Njoya Ahmed Valdy	Men's -81kg	130	14	160	13	290	13
Feugno Cedric Patient	Men's -89kg	140	11	165	9	305	9
Ngadja Nyabeyeu Junior Periclex	Men's -109kg	165	4	205	4	370	4
Eyenga Mbo`Ossi Jeanne Gaelle	Women's -76kg	90	5	124	1st place, gold medalist(s)	214	3rd place, bronze medalist(s)
Meukeugni Noumbissi Clementine	Women's -87kg	101	2nd place, silver medalist(s)	110	2nd place, silver medalist(s)	211	2nd place, silver medalist(s)
Momeni Estelle Adele	Women's +87kg	81	7	95	7	176	7

== Wrestling ==
Men's freestyle

Athlete	Event	Round of 16	Quarterfinal	Semifinal	Repechages	Final / BM	
Athlete	Event	Opposition Result	Opposition Result	Opposition Result	Opposition Result	Opposition Result	Rank
Guidilim Christian	70 kg	Mammadaliyev (AZE); L 0-10	Did not advance				=9

Women's freestyle

Athlete	Event	Round of 16	Quarterfinal	Semifinal	Repechage	Final / BM	
Athlete	Event	Opposition Result	Opposition Result	Opposition Result	Opposition Result	Opposition Result	Rank
Berthe Etane Ngolle	65 kg	—N/a		Manolova (AZE); L 1-2	—N/a	Sazanova (KGZ); L2-8	4
Blandine Ngiri	72 kg	Gassida (CHA); W 2F-3	Oknazarova (UZB); W 4F-4	Zutova (AZE); L 0-6	—N/a	Jeljeli (TUN); L 4-11	=5
