= Morocco at the 2021 Islamic Solidarity Games =

- IOC code: MAR
- NOC: Moroccan Olympic Committee

in Konya, Turkey
- Competitors: 185
- Medals Ranked 6th: Gold 15 Silver 13 Bronze 34 Total 62

Islamic Solidarity Games appearances (overview)
- 2005; 2013; 2017; 2021; 2025

Morocco participated in the 2021 Islamic Solidarity Games held in Konya, Turkey from 9 to 18 August 2022.

The games had been rescheduled several times. In May 2021, the ISSF postponed the event to August 2022 citing the COVID-19 pandemic situation in the participating countries.

== Medalists ==
Medal	Name	Sport	Event	Date
Silver	Mohamed Fares	Athletics	Men's 5000 m	8 August
Gold	Noura Ennadi	Athletics	Women's 400 m Hurdles	9 August

Medals by sport
Sport	1st place, gold medalist(s)	2nd place, silver medalist(s)	3rd place, bronze medalist(s)	Total
Athletics	4	3	7	14
Bocce	2	1	7	10
Judo	0	2	1	3
Karate	3	1	4	8
Kickboxing	3	4	9	16
Shooting	0	0	2	2
Taekwondo	3	2	4	9
Weightlifting	0	0	0	0
Total	15	13	34	62

== Basketball ==
=== Men's 3x3 tournament ===
Group C

Pos	Team	Pld	W	L	PF	PA	PD	Qualification
1	Azerbaijan	3	3	0	57	38	+19	Quarterfinals
2	Mali	3	1	2	48	46	+2	Quarterfinals
3	Turkey	3	1	2	44	53	−9	
4	Morocco	3	1	2	40	52	−12	

Source: Konya 2021
Rules for classification: 1) Wins; 2) Head-to-head record; 3) Points scored.

13 August
16:00

Report

Mali	13–17	Morocco

Karatay Congress and Sport Center, Konya

15 August

Report

Morocco	11–18	Azerbaijan

Karatay Congress and Sport Center Konya

15 August

Report

Turkey	21–12	Morocco

Karatay Congress and Sport Center Konya

== Football ==
Summary

Team	Event	Group stage				Semifinal	Final / BM	
Team	Event	Opposition Score	Opposition Score	Opposition Score	Rank	Opposition Score	Opposition Score	Rank
Morocco U-23 men's	Men's tournament	Iran; W 3–0	Azerbaijan; L 0–2	Saudi Arabia; D 2–2	3	did not advance		5

Group B

Pos	Team	Pld	W	D	L	GF	GA	GD	Pts	Qualification
1	Saudi Arabia	3	3	0	0	6	0	+6	9	Advance to knockout stage
2	Azerbaijan	3	1	1	1	5	3	+2	4	Advance to knockout stage
3	Morocco	3	1	1	1	5	4	+1	4	
4	Iran	3	0	0	3	0	9	−9	0	

8 August 2022
12:30

Morocco	3–0 (w/o)	Iran

Konya

10 August 2022
12:30

Morocco	0–2	Saudi Arabia
		Al-Johani 45+2'; Al-Mutairi 90+1'

Konya

12 August 2022
12:30

Azerbaijan	2–2	Morocco
Ibrahimli 6'; Abdullazade 47' (pen.)		Slim 10'; Regragui 90+3'

Konya

== Handball ==
=== Men's tournament ===
Group A

Pos	Team	Pld	W	D	L	GF	GA	GD	Pts	Qualification
1	Saudi Arabia	2	1	1	0	56	52	+4	3	Semifinals
2	Qatar	2	1	1	0	49	47	+2	3	Semifinals
3	Morocco	2	0	0	2	45	51	−6	0	

Rules for classification: 1) Points; 2) Head-to-head points; 3) Head-to-head goal difference; 4) Head-to-head goals scored; 5) Goal difference; 6) Goals scored; 7) Draw.

8 August 2022; 13:00	Qatar	22–20	Morocco	Selçuklu Municipality International Sports Hall, Selçuklu

10 August 2022; 11:00	Saudi Arabia	29–25	Morocco	Selçuklu Municipality International Sports Hall, Selçuklu

== Volleyball ==
=== Men's tournament ===
Pool A

Pos	Team	Pld	W	L	Pts	SW	SL	SR	SPW	SPL	SPR	Qualification
1	Cameroon	3	2	1	7	8	3	2.667	255	220	1.159	Semifinals
2	Azerbaijan	3	2	1	6	6	4	1.500	232	220	1.055	Semifinals
3	Morocco	3	2	1	5	7	5	1.400	272	246	1.106	
4	Sudan	3	0	3	0	0	9	0.000	152	225	0.676	

Source: TVF

Date	Time		Score		Set 1	Set 2	Set 3	Set 4	Set 5	Total	Report
9 Aug	15:00	Morocco	3–2	Cameroon	25–20	24–26	18–25	25–22	15–12	107–105	Report
11 Aug	13:00	Sudan	0–3	Morocco	14–25	13–25	14–25			41–75	Report
13 Aug	16:00	Azerbaijan	3–1	Morocco	25–20	22–25	28–26	25–19		100–90	Report
