= Jordan at the 2021 Islamic Solidarity Games =

- IOC code: JOR
- NOC: Jordan Olympic Committee

in Konya, Turkey
- Competitors: 58
- Medals: Gold 2 Silver 4 Bronze 6 Total 12

Islamic Solidarity Games appearances
- 2005; 2013; 2017; 2021; 2025

Jordan participated in the 2021 Islamic Solidarity Games held in Konya, Turkey from 9 to 18 August 2022.

The games had been rescheduled several times. In May 2021, the ISSF postponed the event to August 2022 citing the COVID-19 pandemic situation in the participating countries.

== Medalists ==
Medal	Name	Sport	Event	Date

Medals by sport
Sport	1st place, gold medalist(s)	2nd place, silver medalist(s)	3rd place, bronze medalist(s)	Total
Gymnastics	1	0	0	1
Karate	1	0	2	3
Kickboxing	0	3	3	6
Taekwondo	0	1	1	2
Total	2	4	6	12

== Basketball ==
=== Men's 3x3 tournament ===
Group A

Pos	Team	Pld	W	L	PF	PA	PD	Qualification
1	Senegal	3	3	0	51	34	+17	Quarterfinals
2	Jordan	3	1	2	46	47	−1	Quarterfinals
3	Qatar	3	1	2	45	46	−1	
4	Palestine	3	1	2	41	56	−15	

Source: Konya 2021
Rules for classification: 1) Wins; 2) Head-to-head record; 3) Points scored.

13 August
14:00

Report

Jordan	10–18	Senegal

Karatay Congress and Sport Center, Konya

13 August

Report

Qatar	13–22	Jordan

Karatay Congress and Sport Center Konya

15 August

Report

Jordan	14–16	Palestine

Karatay Congress and Sport Center Konya

Quarterfinal

17 August
16:45

Report

Azerbaijan	20–18	Jordan

Karatay Congress and Sport Center, Konya

=== Women's 3x3 tournament ===
Group A

Pos	Team	Pld	W	L	PF	PA	PD	Qualification
1	Saudi Arabia	1	1	0	20	19	+1	Quarterfinals
2	Qatar	1	0	1	19	20	−1	Quarterfinals
3	Jordan	0	0	0	0	0	0	

Source: Konya 2021
Rules for classification: 1) Wins; 2) Head-to-head record; 3) Points scored.

14 August

Cancelled

Qatar	-–-	Jordan

Karatay Congress and Sport Center Konya

14 August

Cancelled

Saudi Arabia	-–-	Jordan

Karatay Congress and Sport Center Konya

== Weightlifting ==
Results

Athlete	Event	Snatch		Clean & Jerk		Total	Result
Athlete	Event	Result	Rank	Result	Rank	Total	Result
Ibrahim Al Fararjeh	67 kg	102	11	120	12	222	11
