= Iran at the 2021 Islamic Solidarity Games =

- IOC code: IRI
- NOC: National Olympic Committee of the Islamic Republic of Iran

in Konya
- Competitors: 251 in 16 sports
- Flag bearers: Alireza Karimi; Akram Khodabandeh
- Medals Ranked 3rd: Gold 39 Silver 44 Bronze 47 Total 130

Islamic Solidarity Games appearances (overview)
- 2005; 2013; 2017; 2021; 2025

Iran participated in the 2021 Islamic Solidarity Games held in Konya, Turkey from 9 to 18 August 2022.

The games had been rescheduled several times. In May 2021, the ISSF postponed the event to August 2022 citing the COVID-19 pandemic situation in the participating countries.

== Competitors ==
Sport	Men	Women	Total
3x3 basketball	4	4	8
Archery	6	2	8
Athletics	12	4	16
Cycling	5	3	8
Fencing	10	7	17
Gymnastics aerobic	4		4
Gymnastics artistic	3		3
Handball	16	16	32
Judo	7	7	14
Karate	8	9	17
Para archery	7	4	11
Para swimming	5		5
Para table tennis	4	4	8
Shooting	2	1	3
Swimming	9		9
Table tennis	4	4	8
Taekwondo	8	7	15
Volleyball	14	14	28
Weightlifting	9	8	17
Wrestling	20		20
Total	157	94	251

== Medal summary ==
=== Medals by sport ===
Sport	Gold	Silver	Bronze	Total
3x3 Basketball			1	1
Archery	1	2	1	4
Athletics		1	1	2
Cycling road	1		1	2
Cycling track		2		2
Fencing	1	3	2	6
Gymnastics aerobic			2	2
Handball			1	1
Judo			1	1
Karate		5	3	8
Para archery	5	5	3	13
Para swimming	5	6	4	15
Para table tennis		4	5	9
Swimming			1	1
Table tennis	3	2		5
Taekwondo	5	4	4	13
Volleyball	1	1		2
Weightlifting	9	6	12	27
Wrestling	8	3	5	16
Total	39	44	47	130

=== Medalists ===
Medal	Name	Sport	Event
Gold	Gisa Baibordi	Archery	Women's individual compound
Gold	Mohammad Ganjkhanloo	Cycling road	Men's road race
Gold	Mohammad Fotouhi; Ali Pakdaman; Mohammad Rahbari; Nima Zahedi	Fencing	Men's team sabre
Gold	Mohammad Reza Arab Ameri	Para archery	Men's individual recurve open
Gold	Hadi Nouri	Para archery	Men's individual compound open
Gold	Ali Sina Manshazadeh; Hadi Nouri	Para archery	Men's doubles compound open
Gold	Farzaneh Asgari; Maryam Yavarpour	Para archery	Women's doubles compound open
Gold	Ramezan Biabani; Maryam Yavarpour	Para archery	Mixed team compound open
Gold	Shahin Izadyar	Para swimming	Men's 50 m freestyle
Gold	Sina Zeighaminejad	Para swimming	Men's 400 m freestyle
Gold	Shahin Izadyar	Para swimming	Men's 100 m backstroke
Gold	Sina Zeighaminejad	Para swimming	Men's 100 m breaststroke
Gold	Mohammad Karimzadeh	Para swimming	Men's 150 m individual medley
Gold	Amir Hossein Hodaei	Table tennis	Men's singles
Gold	Nima Alamian; Noshad Alamian; Amir Hossein Hodaei; Afshin Norouzi	Table tennis	Men's team
Gold	Mahshid Ashtari; Parinaz Hajiloo; Shima Safaei; Neda Shahsavari	Table tennis	Women's team
Gold	Hossein Lotfi	Taekwondo	Men's 58 kg
Gold	Amir Mohammad Bakhshi	Taekwondo	Men's 74 kg
Gold	Ali Ahmadi	Taekwondo	Men's 87 kg
Gold	Alireza Nadalian	Taekwondo	Men's +87 kg
Gold	Nahid Kiani	Taekwondo	Women's 53 kg
Gold	Fazel Pajouman; Esmaeil Mosafer; Mohammad Valizadeh; Arman Rahmani; Amir Reza Sarlak; Esmaeil Talebi; Mehrab Maleki; Shahrouz Homayounfarmanesh; Bardia Saadat; Ali Ramezani; Ehsan Daneshdoust; Abolfazl Gholipour; Ali Hajipour; Pouria Yali	Volleyball	Men
Gold	Mirmostafa Javadi	Weightlifting	Men's 81 kg
Gold	Mirmostafa Javadi	Weightlifting	Men's 81 kg clean & jerk
Gold	Reza Beiranvand	Weightlifting	Men's 96 kg
Gold	Reza Beiranvand	Weightlifting	Men's 96 kg snatch
Gold	Reza Beiranvand	Weightlifting	Men's 96 kg clean & jerk
Gold	Rasoul Motamedi	Weightlifting	Men's 102 kg
Gold	Rasoul Motamedi	Weightlifting	Men's 102 kg snatch
Gold	Rasoul Motamedi	Weightlifting	Men's 102 kg clean & jerk
Gold	Elham Hosseini	Weightlifting	Women's 81 kg snatch
Gold	Ali Savadkouhi	Wrestling	Men's freestyle 79 kg
Gold	Alireza Karimi	Wrestling	Men's freestyle 86 kg
Gold	Ahmad Bazri	Wrestling	Men's freestyle 92 kg
Gold	Mojtaba Goleij	Wrestling	Men's freestyle 97 kg
Gold	Mehdi Hashemi	Wrestling	Men's freestyle 125 kg
Gold	Shirzad Beheshti	Wrestling	Men's Greco-Roman 63 kg
Gold	Mohammad Reza Rostami	Wrestling	Men's Greco-Roman 72 kg
Gold	Ali Akbar Yousefi	Wrestling	Men's Greco-Roman 130 kg
Silver	Mohammad Saleh Palizban	Archery	Men's individual compound
Silver	Amir Kazempour; Gisa Baibordi	Archery	Mixed team compound
Silver	Farzaneh Fasihi	Athletics	Women's 100 m
Silver	Behnam Arian	Cycling track	Men's points race
Silver	Behnam Arian	Cycling track	Men's scratch
Silver	Mohammad Rezaei; Mohammad Rezaei; Mohammad Reza Vosoughi	Fencing	Men's team épée
Silver	Ali Pakdaman	Fencing	Men's individual sabre
Silver	Azam Bakhti; Paria Mahrokh; Mahsa Pourrahmati	Fencing	Women's team épée
Silver	Abolfazl Shahrjerdi	Karate	Men's individual kata
Silver	Ali Asghar Asiabari	Karate	Men's kumite 75 kg
Silver	Fatemeh Sadeghi	Karate	Women's individual kata
Silver	Sepideh Amini; Melika Ezzati; Zeinab Hosseini	Karate	Women's team kata
Silver	Mobina Heidari	Karate	Women's kumite 68 kg
Silver	Gholamreza Rahimi	Para archery	Men's individual recurve open
Silver	Gholamreza Rahimi; Asghar Zareeinejad	Para archery	Men's doubles recurve open
Silver	Somayyeh Rahimi	Para archery	Women's individual recurve open
Silver	Farzaneh Asgari	Para archery	Women's individual compound open
Silver	Mohammad Reza Arab Ameri; Somayyeh Rahimi	Para archery	Mixed team recurve open
Silver	Sina Zeighaminejad	Para swimming	Men's 50 m freestyle
Silver	Sina Zeighaminejad	Para swimming	Men's 100 m freestyle
Silver	Shahin Izadyar	Para swimming	Men's 400 m freestyle
Silver	Shahin Izadyar	Para swimming	Men's 100 m breaststroke
Silver	Sina Zeighaminejad	Para swimming	Men's 100 m butterfly
Silver	Shahin Izadyar	Para swimming	Men's 200 m individual medley
Silver	Amin Sadeghian; Hamid Reza Sheikhzadeh	Para table tennis	Men's team class 4
Silver	Javad Fouladi; Mehdi Masoumi	Para table tennis	Men's team class 5
Silver	Fatemeh Mohammadi	Para table tennis	Women's singles class 10
Silver	Fatemeh Etesaminia; Fatemeh Mohammadi	Para table tennis	Women's team class 10
Silver	Nima Alamian	Table tennis	Men's singles
Silver	Neda Shahsavari	Table tennis	Women's singles
Silver	Ghazal Soltani	Taekwondo	Women's 49 kg
Silver	Narges Mirnourollahi	Taekwondo	Women's 62 kg
Silver	Zeinab Esmaeili	Taekwondo	Women's 67 kg
Silver	Akram Khodabandeh	Taekwondo	Women's +73 kg
Silver	Aytak Salamat; Zahra Karimi; Mohaddeseh Moshtaghi; Shabnam Alikhani; Mahsa Saberi; Maedeh Borhani; Mahsa Kadkhoda; Fatemeh Amini; Negar Kiani; Pouran Zare; Tahmineh Dargazani; Elaheh Poursaleh; Reihaneh Karimi; Zahra Moghani	Volleyball	Women
Silver	Mirmostafa Javadi	Weightlifting	Men's 81 kg snatch
Silver	Peyman Jan	Weightlifting	Men's 109 kg
Silver	Mehdi Karami	Weightlifting	Men's 109 kg snatch
Silver	Peyman Jan	Weightlifting	Men's 109 kg clean & jerk
Silver	Alireza Yousefi	Weightlifting	Men's +109 kg
Silver	Alireza Yousefi	Weightlifting	Men's +109 kg clean & jerk
Silver	Hossein Abouzari	Wrestling	Men's freestyle 70 kg
Silver	Mohammad Sadegh Firouzpour	Wrestling	Men's freestyle 74 kg
Silver	Ramin Taheri	Wrestling	Men's Greco-Roman 87 kg
Bronze	Ehsan Dalirzahan; Sina Vahedi; Amir Hossein Rezaeifar; Matin Aghajanpour	3x3 basketball	Men
Bronze	Amir Kazempour; Mohammad Madandar; Mohammad Saleh Palizban	Archery	Men's team compound
Bronze	Ali Fathi	Athletics	Men's javelin throw
Bronze	Mandana Dehghan	Cycling road	Women's road race
Bronze	Mohammad Rahbari	Fencing	Men's individual sabre
Bronze	Azam Bakhti	Fencing	Women's individual épée
Bronze	Ali Khalili	Gymnastics aerobic	Men's individual
Bronze	Amir Hossein Baniasad; Alireza Nabipour; Saeid Najafi	Gymnastics aerobic	Open trio
Bronze	Ehsan Abouei; Younes Asari; Salaman Barbat; Mehdi Behnamnia; Milad Ghalandari; Mojtaba Heidarpour; Mehran Hosseini; Mohammad Reza Kazemi; Ali Kouhzad; Alireza Mousavi; Shahoo Nosrati; Mohammad Reza Oraei; Ali Rahimi; Afshin Sadeghi; Shahab Sadeghzadeh; Mohammad Siavoshi	Handball	Men
Bronze	Hamid Reza Papi; Vahid Jeddi; Mohammad Reza Sedighi; Mehdi Fathipour; Ghasem Baghcheghi; Mohammad Reza Saeidi; Hamid Reza Malekzadeh	Judo	Men's team
Bronze	Milad Farazmehr; Abolfazl Shahrjerdi; Ali Zand	Karate	Men's team kata
Bronze	Sara Bahmanyar	Karate	Women's kumite 50 kg
Bronze	Leila Borjali	Karate	Women's kumite +68 kg
Bronze	Asghar Zareeinejad	Para archery	Men's individual recurve open
Bronze	Ali Sina Manshazadeh	Para archery	Men's individual compound open
Bronze	Maryam Yavarpour	Para archery	Women's individual compound open
Bronze	Shahin Izadyar	Para swimming	Men's 100 m freestyle
Bronze	Mohammad Karimzadeh	Para swimming	Men's 200 m freestyle
Bronze	Abolfazl Zarif	Para swimming	Men's 100 m backstroke
Bronze	Sina Zeighaminejad	Para swimming	Men's 200 m individual medley
Bronze	Amin Sadeghian	Para table tennis	Men's singles class 4
Bronze	Hamid Reza Sheikhzadeh	Para table tennis	Men's singles class 4
Bronze	Javad Fouladi	Para table tennis	Men's singles class 5
Bronze	Mehdi Masoumi	Para table tennis	Men's singles class 5
Bronze	Pegah Kalahroudi	Para table tennis	Women's singles class 9
Bronze	Sina Gholampour; Samyar Abdoli; Alireza Yavari; Matin Sohran	Swimming	Men's 4 × 100 m freestyle relay
Bronze	Mehdi Haji Mousaei	Taekwondo	Men's 54 kg
Bronze	Mohammad Sadegh Dehghani	Taekwondo	Men's 63 kg
Bronze	Mehran Barkhordari	Taekwondo	Men's 80 kg
Bronze	Nastaran Valizadeh	Taekwondo	Women's 57 kg
Bronze	Hafez Ghashghaei	Weightlifting	Men's 67 kg clean & jerk
Bronze	Hossein Soltani	Weightlifting	Men's 81 kg snatch
Bronze	Hossein Soltani	Weightlifting	Men's 81 kg clean & jerk
Bronze	Mehdi Karami	Weightlifting	Men's 109 kg
Bronze	Peyman Jan	Weightlifting	Men's 109 kg snatch
Bronze	Mehdi Karami	Weightlifting	Men's 109 kg clean & jerk
Bronze	Alireza Yousefi	Weightlifting	Men's +109 kg snatch
Bronze	Poupak Basami	Weightlifting	Women's 55 kg
Bronze	Poupak Basami	Weightlifting	Women's 55 kg snatch
Bronze	Poupak Basami	Weightlifting	Women's 55 kg clean & jerk
Bronze	Elham Hosseini	Weightlifting	Women's 81 kg
Bronze	Elham Hosseini	Weightlifting	Women's 81 kg clean & jerk
Bronze	Majid Dastan	Wrestling	Men's freestyle 61 kg
Bronze	Morteza Ghiasi	Wrestling	Men's freestyle 65 kg
Bronze	Mohammad Javad Rezaei	Wrestling	Men's Greco-Roman 67 kg
Bronze	Amin Kavianinejad	Wrestling	Men's Greco-Roman 77 kg
Bronze	Mehdi Bali	Wrestling	Men's Greco-Roman 97 kg

== Results by event ==
=== 3x3 basketball ===
Athlete	Event	Preliminary round					Quarterfinal	Semifinal	Final	Rank
Athlete	Event	Round 1	Round 2	Round 3	Round 4	Rank	Quarterfinal	Semifinal	Final	Rank
Ehsan Dalirzahan; Sina Vahedi; Amir Hossein Rezaeifar; Matin Aghajanpour	Men	Mauritania; W 21–13	Maldives; W 21–4	Uganda; W 21–12	Guyana; W 21–12	1 Q	Turkmenistan; W 21–11	Azerbaijan; L 17–21	3rd place match Suriname; W 21–11	3rd place, bronze medalist(s)
Shadi Abdolvand; Negin Rasoulipour; Kimia Yazdian; Ayda Golmohammadi	Women	Senegal; L 13–15	Turkmenistan; L 20–21	Gambia; W 21–6	—N/a	2 Q	Uzbekistan; L 9–18	Did not advance		8

=== Archery ===
==== Archery ====
Recurve

Athlete	Event	Ranking round		Round of 64	Round of 32	Round of 16	Quarterfinal	Semifinal	Final	Rank
Athlete	Event	Score	Rank	Round of 64	Round of 32	Round of 16	Quarterfinal	Semifinal	Final	Rank
Sadegh Ashrafi	Men's individual	629	17 Q	Al-Sayaghi (YEM); W 6–0	Islam (BAN); L 4–6	Did not advance				17
Mohammad Hossein Golshani	Men's individual	643	12 Q	Bye	Al-Musa (KSA); L 2–6	Did not advance				17
Reza Shabani	Men's individual	654	8 Q	Bye	Sähedow (TKM); W 6–2	Nam (TJK); L 2–6	Did not advance			9
Sadegh Ashrafi; Mohammad Hossein Golshani; Reza Shabani	Men's team	1926	4 Q	—N/a		Bye	Bangladesh; L 1–5	Did not advance		6
Mahta Abdollahi	Women's individual	631	3 Q	Bye	Hallas (CHA); W 7–1	Kanatbek Kyzy (KGZ); W 6–2	Fazil (MAS); L 4–6	Did not advance		5
Reza Shabani; Mahta Abdollahi	Mixed team	1285	3 Q	—N/a		Guinea; W 6–2	Azerbaijan; W 5–1	Indonesia; L 1–5	3rd place match Uzbekistan; L 4–5	4

Compound

Athlete	Event	Ranking round		Round of 32	Round of 16	Quarterfinal	Semifinal	Final	Rank
Athlete	Event	Score	Rank	Round of 32	Round of 16	Quarterfinal	Semifinal	Final	Rank
Amir Kazempour	Men's individual	693	4 Q	Bye	Loh (MAS); L 143–144	Did not advance			9
Mohammad Madandar	Men's individual	684	10 Q	Al-Shamrani (KSA); W 139–132	Uslu (TUR); L 140–143	Did not advance			9
Mohammad Saleh Palizban	Men's individual	690	5 Q	Bye	Aqil (MAS); W 145–144	Loh (MAS); W 145–143	Haney (TUR); W 149–148	Mazuki (MAS); L 137–148	2nd place, silver medalist(s)
Amir Kazempour; Mohammad Madandar; Mohammad Saleh Palizban	Men's team	2067	3 Q	—N/a		Saudi Arabia; W 229–214	Indonesia; L 231–233	3rd place match Turkey; W 233–230	3rd place, bronze medalist(s)
Gisa Baibordi	Women's individual	687	3 Q	—N/a	Bye	Ray (BAN); W 144–143	Süzer (TUR); W 144–140	Bostan (TUR); W 146–142	1st place, gold medalist(s)
Amir Kazempour; Gisa Baibordi	Mixed team	1380	2 Q	—N/a		Bye	Indonesia; W 156–154	Turkey; L 149–156	2nd place, silver medalist(s)

==== Para archery ====
Recurve open

Athlete	Event	Ranking round		Round of 16	Quarterfinal	Semifinal	Final	Rank
Athlete	Event	Score	Rank	Round of 16	Quarterfinal	Semifinal	Final	Rank
Mohammad Reza Arab Ameri	Men's individual	601	4 Q	Bye	Savaş (TUR); W 7–3	Zareeinejad (IRI); W 7–3	Rahimi (IRI); W 6–0	1st place, gold medalist(s)
Gholamreza Rahimi	Men's individual	605	3 Q	Bye	Musayev (AZE); W 6–2	Papağan (TUR); W 6–5	Arab Ameri (IRI); L 0–6	2nd place, silver medalist(s)
Asghar Zareeinejad	Men's individual	609	1 Q	Bye	Yılmazlı (TUR); W 6–4	Arab Ameri (IRI); L 3–7	3rd place match Papağan (TUR); W 7–1	3rd place, bronze medalist(s)
Gholamreza Rahimi; Asghar Zareeinejad	Men's doubles	1214	1 Q	—N/a		Bye	Turkey; L 3–5	2nd place, silver medalist(s)
Somayyeh Rahimi	Women's individual	540	3 Q	—N/a		Şengül (TUR); W 6–0	Eroğlu (TUR); L 1–7	2nd place, silver medalist(s)
Mohammad Reza Arab Ameri; Somayyeh Rahimi	Mixed team	1149	2 Q	—N/a		Azerbaijan; W 6–2	Turkey; L 0–6	2nd place, silver medalist(s)

Compound open

Athlete	Event	Ranking round		Round of 16	Quarterfinal	Semifinal	Final	Rank
Athlete	Event	Score	Rank	Round of 16	Quarterfinal	Semifinal	Final	Rank
Ramezan Biabani	Men's individual	665	6 Q	Rahiminia (UAE); W 141–108	Nouri (IRI); L 136–143	Did not advance		5
Ali Sina Manshazadeh	Men's individual	689	2 Q	Bye	Imomkulov (UZB); W 142–113	Nouri (IRI); L 144–145	3rd place match Al-Blooshi (UAE); W 147–87	3rd place, bronze medalist(s)
Hadi Nouri	Men's individual	687	3 Q	Bye	Biabani (IRI); W 143–136	Manshazadeh (IRI); W 145–144	Aygan (TUR); W 142–139	1st place, gold medalist(s)
Ali Sina Manshazadeh; Hadi Nouri	Men's doubles	1376	2 Q	—N/a		United Arab Emirates; W 156–124	Turkey; W 154–145	1st place, gold medalist(s)
Farzaneh Asgari	Women's individual	650	4 Q	—N/a	Hosseini (IRI); W 138–125	Yorulmaz (TUR); W 139–137	Cüre (TUR); L 140–142	2nd place, silver medalist(s)
Monir Hosseini	Women's individual	626	5 Q	—N/a	Asgari (IRI); L 125–138	Did not advance		5
Maryam Yavarpour	Women's individual	667	3 Q	—N/a	Al-Naqbi (UAE); W 140–112	Cüre (TUR); L 134–144	3rd place match Yorulmaz (TUR); W 137–137 (10–9 SO)	3rd place, bronze medalist(s)
Farzaneh Asgari; Maryam Yavarpour	Women's doubles	1317	2 Q	—N/a			Turkey; W 153–149	1st place, gold medalist(s)
Ramezan Biabani; Maryam Yavarpour	Mixed team	1356	2 Q	—N/a		United Arab Emirates; W 155–104	Turkey; W 154–150	1st place, gold medalist(s)

W1

Athlete	Event	Ranking round		Semifinal	Final	Rank
Athlete	Event	Score	Rank	Semifinal	Final	Rank
Mohammad Reza Zandi	Men's individual	624	3 Q	Hekimoğlu (TUR); L 132–133	3rd place match Türkmenoğlu (TUR); L 128–130	4

=== Athletics ===
Track

Athlete	Event	Round 1		Semifinal		Final	Rank
Athlete	Event	Time	Rank	Time	Rank	Time	Rank
Mohammad Hossein Abareghi	Men's 100 m	10.20	3 Q	DNS	—	Did not advance	—
Hassan Taftian	Men's 100 m	9.88	1 Q	10.05	2 Q	10.02	5
Mohammad Hossein Abareghi	Men's 200 m	20.75	1 Q	20.74	2 Q	20.93	5
Hassan Taftian	Men's 200 m	DSQ	—	Did not advance			—
Amir Zamanpour	Men's 1500 m	3:49.97	5 q	—N/a		4:02.44	9
Amir Zamanpour	Men's 5000 m	—N/a				14:49.21	9
Masoud Kamran	Men's 110 m hurdles	13.81	5 q	—N/a		13.74	5
Mehdi Pirjahan	Men's 400 m hurdles	50.58	3 Q	—N/a		49.35	4
Farzaneh Fasihi	Women's 100 m	11.24	1 Q	11.30	1 Q	11.12	2nd place, silver medalist(s)
Farzaneh Fasihi	Women's 200 m	DNS	—	Did not advance			—
Toktam Dastarbandan	Women's 800 m	—N/a				2:11.46	6
Toktam Dastarbandan	Women's 1500 m	—N/a				4:41.29	12
Toktam Dastarbandan; Mahsa Mirzatabibi; Reihaneh Mobini; Farzaneh Fasihi	Women's 4 × 400 m relay	—N/a				4:32.48	5

Field

Athlete	Event	Qualification		Final	
Athlete	Event	Result	Rank	Result	Rank
Hamid Reza Kia	Men's triple jump	—N/a		16.07	4
Morteza Nazemi	Men's shot put	—N/a		18.98	4
Mehdi Saberi	Men's shot put	—N/a		18.69	6
Ehsan Haddadi	Men's discus throw	—N/a		59.81	5
Hossein Rasouli	Men's discus throw	—N/a		54.83	9
Reza Moghaddam	Men's hammer throw	—N/a		No mark	—
Ali Fathi	Men's javelin throw	—N/a		71.42	3rd place, bronze medalist(s)
Mahsa Mirzatabibi	Women's pole vault	—N/a		3.70	4
Reihaneh Mobini	Women's long jump	6.08	8 q	5.54	11

=== Cycling ===
==== Road ====
Athlete	Event	Time	Rank
Aidin Aliyari	Men's road race	3:07:39	38
Behnam Arian	Men's road race	2:58:13	11
Mohammad Ganjkhanloo	Men's road race	2:58:08	1st place, gold medalist(s)
Amir Hossein Jamshidian	Men's road race	2:58:13	12
Ali Asghar Mousazadeh	Men's road race	2:58:16	13
Aidin Aliyari	Men's individual time trial	31:41.071	7
Behnam Arian	Men's individual time trial	31:45.600	8
Forouzan Abdollahi	Women's road race	2:44:43	15
Mandana Dehghan	Women's road race	2:32:22	3rd place, bronze medalist(s)
Somayyeh Yazdani	Women's road race	2:36:11	8
Mandana Dehghan	Women's individual time trial	23:56.553	5
Somayyeh Yazdani	Women's individual time trial	Did not start	—

==== Track ====
Endurance

Athlete	Event	Qualifying		Final	
Athlete	Event	Time	Rank	Time / Score	Rank
Aidin Aliyari	Men's individual pursuit	4:25.369	3 QB	3rd place match Fomovskiy (UZB); L 4:26.839–4:25.234	4
Amir Hossein Jamshidian	Men's individual pursuit	4:29.391	6	Did not advance	
Behnam Arian	Men's points race	—N/a		17 pts	2nd place, silver medalist(s)
Amir Hossein Jamshidian	Men's points race	—N/a		11 pts	5
Behnam Arian	Men's scratch	—N/a			2nd place, silver medalist(s)
Mohammad Ganjkhanloo	Men's scratch	—N/a		−1 lap	10
Mandana Dehghan	Women's individual pursuit	4:11.000	13	Did not advance	
Somayyeh Yazdani	Women's individual pursuit	3:54.529	7	Did not advance	
Forouzan Abdollahi	Women's points race	—N/a		−40 pts	11
Somayyeh Yazdani	Women's points race	—N/a		12 pts	5
Forouzan Abdollahi	Women's scratch	—N/a			11
Somayyeh Yazdani	Women's scratch	—N/a			7

Combined

Athlete	Event	Scratch race		Tempo race		Elimination race		Points race		Total	Rank
Athlete	Event	Rank	Points	Rank	Points	Rank	Points	Rank	Points	Total	Rank
Behnam Arian	Men's omnium	18	6	14	14	14	14	13	0	34	15
Mohammad Ganjkhanloo	Men's omnium	4	34	8	26	5	32	5	18	110	5
Forouzan Abdollahi	Women's omnium	13	16	13	16	13	16	12	−37	11	13
Somayyeh Yazdani	Women's omnium	6	30	8	26	12	18	2	16	90	8

=== Fencing ===
Épée

Athlete	Event	Pool round		Round of 32	Round of 16	Quarterfinal	Semifinal	Final	Rank
Athlete	Event	Results	Rank	Round of 32	Round of 16	Quarterfinal	Semifinal	Final	Rank
Mohammad Rezaei	Men's individual	Al-Omairi (KSA) W 5–4; Awan (PAK) W 5–0; Bakytbek Uulu (KGZ) L 3–5; Al-Maazmi (UAE) W 5–3; El-Kord (MAR) W 5–3; Muminov (UZB) L 1–5	11 Q	Preira (SEN); W 15–11	Sertay (KAZ); W 15–13	Petrov (KGZ); L 11–15	Did not advance		7
Mohammad Rezaei	Men's individual	Al-Hussain (KSA) W 5–4; Öner (TUR) W 5–4; Nurmatov (UZB) L 2–5; Guliyev (AZE) L 2–5; Preira (SEN) W 5–2	16 Q	Bakytbek Uulu (KGZ); W 15–8	Odeh (JOR); L 10–15	Did not advance			14
Mohammad Reza Vosoughi	Men's individual	Petrov (KGZ) L 2–5; El-Choueiri (LBN) L 4–5; Odeh (JOR) L 3–5; Aleksandrov (UZB) W 5–4; Al-Dawood (KSA) L 4–5; Say (TUR) W 5–4	23 Q	Muminov (UZB); L 10–15	Did not advance				24
Mohammad Rezaei; Mohammad Rezaei; Mohammad Reza Vosoughi	Men's team	—N/a				Saudi Arabia; W 38–37	Kyrgyzstan; W 45–41	Azerbaijan; L 35–45	2nd place, silver medalist(s)
Azam Bakhti	Women's individual	Egamberdieva (UZB) L 0–1; Abou Jaoude (LBN) W 5–4; Diab (QAT) W 5–3; Günaç (TUR) L 0–5; Al-Qassem (KSA) W 5–0	11 Q	Bye	Günaç (TUR); W 15–12	Nikolaichuk (KAZ); W 15–12	Ertürk (TUR); L 11–13	Did not advance	3rd place, bronze medalist(s)
Paria Mahrokh	Women's individual	Abdyl-Khamitova (KGZ) L 3–5; Zubaydulloeva (UZB) W 5–2; Ertürk (TUR) L 4–5; Al-Soufi (YEM) W 5–0; Abed (KSA) W 5–2; Sabaly (SEN) W 5–3	8 Q	Bye	Abdyl-Khamitova (KGZ); L 13–15	Did not advance			12
Mahsa Pourrahmati	Women's individual	Diab (QAT) W 5–1; Al-Khibiri (KSA) W 5–3; Sabaly (SEN) W 3–2; Erman (TUR) L 4–5; Rakhimova (UZB) L 4–5	10 Q	Bye	Erman (TUR); W 15–9	Ertürk (TUR); L 13–14	Did not advance		7
Azam Bakhti; Paria Mahrokh; Mahsa Pourrahmati	Women's team	—N/a				Saudi Arabia; W 45–24	Senegal; W 45–23	Turkey; L 39–45	2nd place, silver medalist(s)

Foil

Athlete	Event	Pool round		Round of 32	Round of 16	Quarterfinal	Semifinal	Final	Rank
Athlete	Event	Results	Rank	Round of 32	Round of 16	Quarterfinal	Semifinal	Final	Rank
Ali Amini	Men's individual	Minuto (TUR) L 1–5; El-Choueiri (LBN) W 5–0; Solikhojiev (UZB) W 5–2; Islam (BAN) W 5–1; Khalifa (QAT) L 1–5	10 Q	Bye	Eyüpoğlu (TUR); L 9–15	Did not advance			10
Mohammad Hossein Jafari	Men's individual	Eyüpoğlu (TUR) L 3–5; Hossain (BAN) W 5–1; Molina (UZB) L 0–5; Wakim (LBN) L 0–5	16 Q	Mia (BAN); W 15–10	Minuto (TUR); L 5–15	Did not advance			15
Mahan Mirzaei	Men's individual	Sadullaev (UZB) L 2–5; Özyalçın (TUR) W 5–4; El-Hajj (LBN) W 5–1; Owaida (QAT) L 2–5	14 Q	Bye	Sadullaev (UZB); L 11–15	Did not advance			14
Ali Amini; Mohammad Hossein Jafari; Mahan Mirzaei	Men's team	—N/a				Lebanon; W 45–44	Turkey; L 30–45	3rd place match Qatar; L 34–45	4

Sabre

Athlete	Event	Pool round		Round of 32	Round of 16	Quarterfinal	Semifinal	Final	Rank
Athlete	Event	Results	Rank	Round of 32	Round of 16	Quarterfinal	Semifinal	Final	Rank
Mohammad Fotouhi	Men's individual	Tahla (JOR) W 5–3; Aslan (TUR) W 5–3; Al-Mutairi (KSA) W 5–4; Kane (MLI) W 5–1; Aymuratov (UZB) L 4–5	5 Q	Bye	Mamutov (UZB); W 15–10	Rahbari (IRI); L 9–15	Did not advance		5
Ali Pakdaman	Men's individual	Samake (MLI) W 5–0; Çağlayan (TUR) W 5–3; Abdazov (UZB) W 5–1; Al-Blawi (JOR) W 5–1; Al-Bahrani (KSA) W 5–2; Bou Khalil (LBN) W 5–0	1 Q	Bye	Aslan (TUR); W 15–5	Sattarkhan (KAZ); W 15–10	Rahbari (IRI); W 15–11	Yıldırım (TUR); L 14–15	2nd place, silver medalist(s)
Mohammad Rahbari	Men's individual	Al-Masri (JOR) L 1–5; Anasız (TUR) W 5–2; Mamutov (UZB) W 5–2; Al-Baqami (KSA) W 5–0; Sattarkhan (KAZ) W 5–2	4 Q	Bye	Al-Masri (JOR); W 15–6	Fotouhi (IRI); W 15–9	Pakdaman (IRI); L 11–15	Did not advance	3rd place, bronze medalist(s)
Nima Zahedi	Men's individual	Al-Bakr (KSA) W 5–1; Gaye (SEN) W 5–0; Yıldırım (TUR) L 1–5; Kodirov (UZB) L 2–5; Al-Amawi (JOR) L 1–5	17 Q	Aslan (TUR); L 14–15	Did not advance				19
Mohammad Fotouhi; Ali Pakdaman; Mohammad Rahbari; Nima Zahedi	Men's team	—N/a				Bye	Mali; W 45–23	Turkey; W 45–28	1st place, gold medalist(s)
Kiana Bagherzadeh	Women's individual	Usnatdinova (UZB) L 3–5; Bolshakova (AZE) L 1–5; Al-Hammad (KSA) L 3–5; Güngör (TUR) L 2–5; Sarybay (KAZ) W 5–3	18 Q	Usnatdinova (UZB); L 12–15	Did not advance				18
Parimah Barzegar	Women's individual	Badehidoh (YEM) W 5–0; Al-Muammar (KSA) W 5–0; Shchukla (TUR) L 3–5; Kaspiarovich (AZE) L 1–5; Ismoilova (UZB) W 5–1	10 Q	Bye	Çakır (TUR); L 10–15	Did not advance			10
Faezeh Rafiei	Women's individual	Al-Masri (KSA) W 5–2; Pliego (UZB) W 5–4; Mujib (BAN) W 5–1; Karimova (AZE) L 2–5; Çakır (TUR) L 3–5	11 Q	Bye	Kaspiarovich (AZE); L 7–15	Did not advance			11
Najmeh Sazanjian	Women's individual	Al-Qahtani (KSA) W 5–0; Dayibekova (UZB) L 2–5; Bashta (AZE) L 0–5; Dembélé (MLI) W 5–0; Şişik (TUR) W 5–0	9 Q	Bye	Shchukla (TUR); L 12–15	Did not advance			9
Kiana Bagherzadeh; Parimah Barzegar; Faezeh Rafiei; Najmeh Sazanjian	Women's team	—N/a				Saudi Arabia; W 45–18	Azerbaijan; L 22–45	3rd place match Turkey; L 23–45	4

=== Gymnastics ===
==== Aerobic ====
Athlete	Event	Qualification		Final	
Athlete	Event	Score	Rank	Score	Rank
Ali Khalili	Men's individual	17.300	3 Q	18.000	3rd place, bronze medalist(s)
Amir Hossein Baniasad; Alireza Nabipour; Saeid Najafi	Open trio	17.750	3 Q	17.800	3rd place, bronze medalist(s)

==== Artistic ====
Men – Qualification

Athlete	Event	Floor		Pommel horse		Rings		Vault		Parallel bars		Horizontal bar		Total	
Athlete	Event	Score	Rank	Score	Rank	Score	Rank	Score	Rank	Score	Rank	Score	Rank	Score	Rank
Mehdi Ahmadkohani	Individual	11.600	14	11.500	13	14.700	2 Q	12.400	—N/a	13.200	10 (11)	12.900	5 Q	76.300	7
Mohammad Reza Hamidi	Individual	11.650	13	10.950	14	12.000	11 (12)	12.750	—N/a	12.100	13	11.500	13	70.950	—
Mohammad Reza Khosronejad	Individual	12.250	9	12.600	11	13.700	6 Q	11.600	—N/a	13.300	7 Q	10.850	14	74.300	8
Mehdi Ahmadkohani; Mohammad Reza Hamidi; Mohammad Reza Khosronejad	Team	23.900		24.100		28.400		25.150		26.500		24.400		152.450	5

Men – Finals

Athlete	Event	FX	PH	SR	VT	PB	HB	Rank
Mehdi Ahmadkohani	Rings	—N/a		13.800	—N/a			5
Mohammad Reza Khosronejad	Rings	—N/a		13.600	—N/a			6
Mohammad Reza Khosronejad	Parallel bars	—N/a				WD	—N/a	9
Mehdi Ahmadkohani	Horizontal bar	—N/a					10.250	8

=== Handball ===
Team	Event	Preliminary round				Semifinal	Final	Rank
Team	Event	Round 1	Round 2	Round 3	Rank	Semifinal	Final	Rank
Iran	Men	Turkey; W 26–20	Azerbaijan; W 42–20	—N/a	1 Q	Qatar; L 23–24	3rd place match Saudi Arabia; W 30–21	3rd place, bronze medalist(s)
Iran	Women	Afghanistan; W 43–6	Cameroon; L 29–42	Azerbaijan; L 17–26	3	Did not advance	5th place match Senegal; L 24–25	6
Roster – Men: Ehsan Abouei; Younes Asari; Salaman Barbat; Mehdi Behnamnia; Milad Ghalandari; Mojtaba Heidarpour; Mehran Hosseini; Mohammad Reza Kazemi; Ali Kouhzad; Alireza Mousavi; Shahoo Nosrati; Mohammad Reza Oraei; Ali Rahimi; Afshin Sadeghi; Shahab Sadeghzadeh; Mohammad Siavoshi; Coach: (Montenegro) Veselin Vujović Roster – Women: Nourieh Abbasi; Mehraban Badvi; Mojgan Ghahremani; Elnaz Ghasemi; Bahar Izadgashb; Fatemeh Khalili; Arezoo Kianiara; Hanieh Lak; Arezoo Mohammadi; Hadiseh Norouzi; Setareh Rahmanian; Sanaz Rajabi; Mina Vatanparast; Maryam Yousefi; Shaghayegh Zafari; Asra Zandi; Coach: (Spain) Montserrat Puche

=== Judo ===
Athlete	Event	Round of 32	Round of 16	Quarterfinal	Semifinal	Final	Rank
Hamid Reza Papi	Men's 66 kg	Ystybay (KAZ); L 00–02	Did not advance				17
Vahid Jeddi	Men's 73 kg	Nugraha (INA); W 11–00	Njie (GAM); L 00–10	Did not advance			9
Mohammad Reza Sedighi	Men's 73 kg	Youssouf (CHA); W 10–00	Valiyev (AZE); L 00–11	Did not advance			9
Mehdi Fathipour	Men's 81 kg	Ömirow (TKM); W 10–00	Albayrak (TUR); L 00–01	Did not advance			9
Ghasem Baghcheghi	Men's 90 kg	Shah (PAK); W 02–00	Madzhidov (TJK); L 00–02	Did not advance			9
Mohammad Reza Saeidi	Men's 90 kg	Ramaj (ALB); W 10–00	Ustopiriyon (TJK); L 00–10	Did not advance			9
Hamid Reza Malekzadeh	Men's +100 kg	—N/a	Yusifov (AZE); L 00–02	Did not advance			9
Hamid Reza Papi; Vahid Jeddi; Mohammad Reza Sedighi; Mehdi Fathipour; Ghasem Baghcheghi; Mohammad Reza Saeidi; Hamid Reza Malekzadeh	Men's team	—N/a	Bye	Turkmenistan; W 3–1	Turkey; L 1–3	3rd place match Senegal; W 3–0	3rd place, bronze medalist(s)
Shiva Jahangiri	Women's 48 kg	—N/a	Nourdine (COM); W 10–00	Aliyeva (AZE); L 00–11	Repechage; Rezzoug (ALG); L 00–10	Did not advance	7
Fatemeh Kamalipour	Women's 52 kg	—N/a	Baba (CMR); L 00–10	Did not advance			9
Sayan Chegeni	Women's 57 kg	—N/a	Aliyeva (AZE); W 10–01	Dabonne (CIV); L 00–10	Repechage; Korkmaz (TUR); L 00–11	Did not advance	7
Mohaddeseh Hosseini	Women's 63 kg	—N/a	Lika (ALB); W 02–00	Belkadi (ALG); L 00–10	Repechage; Daşkinowa (TKM); L 00–01	Did not advance	7
Maryam Barbat	Women's 70 kg	—N/a	Sonko (SEN); W 10–00	Biami (CMR); W 10–00	Matniyazova (UZB); L 00–10	3rd place match Nazarova (UZB); L 00–01	5
Reihaneh Gilani	Women's 70 kg	—N/a	Nazarova (UZB); L 00–02	Did not advance			9
Maryam Peimani	Women's 78 kg	—N/a		Yatim (MAR); L 00–10	Repechage; Arrey (CMR); L 00–10	Did not advance	7
Shiva Jahangiri; Fatemeh Kamalipour; Sayan Chegeni; Mohaddeseh Hosseini; Maryam Barbat; Reihaneh Gilani; Maryam Peimani	Women's team	—N/a	Bye	Kyrgyzstan; L 0–3	Repechage; Uzbekistan; W WO	3rd place match Algeria; L 1–3	5

=== Karate ===
Kata

Athlete	Event	Round 1		Round 2		Final	Rank
Athlete	Event	Score	Rank	Score	Rank	Final	Rank
Abolfazl Shahrjerdi	Men's individual	25.20	1 Q	25.20	1 Q	Sofuoğlu (TUR); L 24.86–26.06	2nd place, silver medalist(s)
Milad Farazmehr; Abolfazl Shahrjerdi; Ali Zand	Men's team	23.32	4 Q	23.60	3 QB	3rd place match Algeria; W 25.66–25.00	3rd place, bronze medalist(s)
Fatemeh Sadeghi	Women's individual	25.14	1 Q	24.80	1 Q	Bozan (TUR); L 25.12–25.74	2nd place, silver medalist(s)
Sepideh Amini; Melika Ezzati; Zeinab Hosseini	Women's team	24.54	1 Q	—N/a		Morocco; L 23.86–24.66	2nd place, silver medalist(s)

Kumite

Athlete	Event	Round of 32	Round of 16	Quarterfinal	Semifinal	Final	Rank
Ali Meskini	Men's 60 kg	Akbarov (KGZ); L 5–5	Did not advance				17
Morteza Nemati	Men's 67 kg	Bye	Al-Natsheh (QAT); W 4–1	Uygur (TUR); W 2–1	Oubaya (MAR); L 1–5	3rd place match Aghalarzade (AZE); L 3–7	5
Ali Asghar Asiabari	Men's 75 kg	Bye	Modou (SEN); W 2–0	Nurlanov (KGZ); W 2–2	Masarweh (JOR); W HAN (0–6)	Alami (MAR); L 0–7	2nd place, silver medalist(s)
Mehdi Khodabakhshi	Men's 84 kg	Bye	Diop (SEN); W 2–2	Zhangbyr (KAZ); L 2–2	Did not advance		9
Majid Nikouhemmat	Men's +84 kg	—N/a	Gurbanli (AZE); L 0–2	Did not advance	Repechage; Shadykanov (KGZ); W WO	3rd place match Daikhi (ALG); L 1–4	5
Sara Bahmanyar	Women's 50 kg	—N/a	Bye	Aisaeva (KGZ); W 4–0	El-Hayti (MAR); L 1–3	3rd place match Alimanova (KAZ); W 1–0	3rd place, bronze medalist(s)
Taravat Khaksar	Women's 55 kg	—N/a	Bye	Sadigova (AZE); L 1–2	Did not advance		8
Rozita Alipour	Women's 61 kg	Bye	Tursunalieva (UZB); L 2–3, DSQ	Did not advance			—
Mobina Heidari	Women's 68 kg	—N/a	Diop (SEN); W 2–0	Mekkaoui (ALG); W 1–0	Eltemur (TUR); W 8–3	Zaretska (AZE); L 1–2	2nd place, silver medalist(s)
Leila Borjali	Women's +68 kg	—N/a	Maltseva (KGZ); W 4–0	Aliyeva (AZE); W 4–4	Hocaoğlu (TUR); L 6–7	3rd place match Ogandoa (CMR); W 3–1	3rd place, bronze medalist(s)

=== Shooting ===
Athlete	Event	Qualification		Semifinal		Final	
Athlete	Event	Score	Rank	Score	Rank	Score	Rank
Babak Yeganeh	Men's trap	114	19	Did not advance			19
Ali Dousti	Men's skeet	118	9	Did not advance			9
Marzieh Parvareshnia	Women's trap	113	8 Q	17, +1 SO	3	Did not advance	6
Babak Yeganeh; Marzieh Parvareshnia	Mixed trap team	134, +2 SO	5	—N/a		Did not advance	5

=== Swimming ===
==== Swimming ====
Athlete	Event	Heats		Semifinals		Final	
Athlete	Event	Time	Rank	Time	Rank	Time	Rank
Benyamin Gharehhassanloo	Men's 50 m freestyle	23.36	5 Q	23.06	5 Q	23.07	6
Matin Sohran	Men's 50 m freestyle	23.62	11 Q	23.61	12	Did not advance	
Samyar Abdoli	Men's 100 m freestyle	52.08	2 Q	50.89	5 Q	50.76	5
Matin Sohran	Men's 100 m freestyle	52.44	7 Q	51.55	7 Q	54.99	8
Samyar Abdoli	Men's 200 m freestyle	1:59.94	11	—N/a		Did not advance	
Alireza Yavari	Men's 200 m freestyle	1:54.81	5 Q	—N/a		1:53.41	5
Homer Abbasi	Men's 50 m backstroke	26.95	10 Q	26.54	7 Q	26.88	8
Abolfazl Sam	Men's 50 m backstroke	26.36	4 Q	26.34	5 Q	26.38	6
Homer Abbasi	Men's 100 m backstroke	57.93	4 Q	57.99	8 Q	1:01.64	8
Abolfazl Sam	Men's 100 m backstroke	56.78	2 Q	56.36	3 Q	56.42	4
Homer Abbasi	Men's 200 m backstroke	2:10.53	6 Q	—N/a		Withdrew	9
Abolfazl Sam	Men's 200 m backstroke	2:04.67	2 Q	—N/a		2:04.91	4
Mehran Ghasemzadeh	Men's 50 m breaststroke	29.89	13 Q	29.27	9	Did not advance	
Mehran Ghasemzadeh	Men's 100 m breaststroke	1:05.43	7 Q	1:04.49	10	Did not advance	
Mehran Ghasemzadeh	Men's 200 m breaststroke	2:23.09	8 Q	—N/a		Withdrew	9
Mehrshad Afghari	Men's 50 m butterfly	24.84	5 Q	24.50	5 Q	24.37	6
Matin Sohran	Men's 50 m butterfly	25.02	7 Q	Withdrew	16	Did not advance	
Mehrshad Afghari	Men's 100 m butterfly	54.75	2 Q	53.99	3 Q	54.20	6
Alireza Yavari	Men's 100 m butterfly	DNF	—	Did not advance			
Sina Gholampour; Samyar Abdoli; Alireza Yavari; Matin Sohran	Men's 4 × 100 m freestyle relay	3:23.82	2 Q	—N/a		3:22.46	3rd place, bronze medalist(s)
Alireza Yavari; Sina Gholampour; Homer Abbasi; Matin Sohran	Men's 4 × 200 m freestyle relay	—N/a				7:43.62	4
Abolfazl Sam; Mehran Ghasemzadeh; Mehrshad Afghari; Matin Sohran	Men's 4 × 100 m medley relay	—N/a				3:46.55	4

==== Para swimming ====
Athlete	Event	Heats			Final		
Athlete	Event	Time	Points	Rank	Time	Points	Rank
Ali Amini	Men's 50 m freestyle	1:16.03	0	16	Did not advance		
Shahin Izadyar	Men's 50 m freestyle	26.90	780	2 Q	26.07	849	1st place, gold medalist(s)
Mohammad Karimzadeh	Men's 50 m freestyle	1:05.02	6	15	Did not advance		
Abolfazl Zarif	Men's 50 m freestyle	28.66	782	1 Q	28.58	789	4
Sina Zeighaminejad	Men's 50 m freestyle	27.02	770	4 Q	26.47	817	2nd place, silver medalist(s)
Shahin Izadyar	Men's 100 m freestyle	1:00.90	677	3 Q	58.45	779	3rd place, bronze medalist(s)
Abolfazl Zarif	Men's 100 m freestyle	1:06.22	616	5 Q	1:03.36	730	4
Sina Zeighaminejad	Men's 100 m freestyle	1:02.58	606	6 Q	57.63	811	2nd place, silver medalist(s)
Ali Amini	Men's 200 m freestyle	—N/a			5:42.93	1	5
Mohammad Karimzadeh	Men's 200 m freestyle	—N/a			4:52.86	35	3rd place, bronze medalist(s)
Shahin Izadyar	Men's 400 m freestyle	—N/a			4:43.55	579	2nd place, silver medalist(s)
Abolfazl Zarif	Men's 400 m freestyle	—N/a			5:19.48	394	4
Sina Zeighaminejad	Men's 400 m freestyle	—N/a			4:42.37	592	1st place, gold medalist(s)
Ali Amini	Men's 50 m backstroke	—N/a			1:36.25	1	6
Mohammad Karimzadeh	Men's 50 m backstroke	—N/a			1:15.48	56	5
Shahin Izadyar	Men's 100 m backstroke	1:17.19	408	3 Q	1:09.22	697	1st place, gold medalist(s)
Abolfazl Zarif	Men's 100 m backstroke	1:17.80	517	2 Q	1:14.95	617	3rd place, bronze medalist(s)
Sina Zeighaminejad	Men's 100 m backstroke	1:24.17	204	6 Q	1:17.37	402	6
Shahin Izadyar	Men's 100 m breaststroke	1:19.02	690	2 Q	1:12.62	853	2nd place, silver medalist(s)
Sina Zeighaminejad	Men's 100 m breaststroke	1:21.16	633	3 Q	1:12.33	860	1st place, gold medalist(s)
Ali Amini	Men's 50 m butterfly	—N/a			1:12.16	19	5
Mohammad Karimzadeh	Men's 50 m butterfly	—N/a			1:36.79	0	6
Shahin Izadyar	Men's 100 m butterfly	1:17.25	171	7 Q	Withdrew		7
Abolfazl Zarif	Men's 100 m butterfly	1:16.52	301	5 Q	1:14.38	379	5
Sina Zeighaminejad	Men's 100 m butterfly	1:13.59	282	6 Q	1:06.92	552	2nd place, silver medalist(s)
Ali Amini	Men's 150 m individual medley	—N/a			5:16.64	0	3
Mohammad Karimzadeh	Men's 150 m individual medley	—N/a			3:56.98	66	1st place, gold medalist(s)
Shahin Izadyar	Men's 200 m individual medley	3:06.15	73	8 Q	2:27.23	685	2nd place, silver medalist(s)
Abolfazl Zarif	Men's 200 m individual medley	2:54.26	324	3 Q	2:41.15	566	4
Sina Zeighaminejad	Men's 200 m individual medley	2:47.95	282	4 Q	2:30.35	621	3rd place, bronze medalist(s)

=== Table tennis ===
==== Table tennis ====
Individual

Athlete	Event	Round of 64	Round of 32	Round of 16	Quarterfinal	Semifinal	Final	Rank
Nima Alamian	Men's singles	Bye	Hamie (LBN); W 3–2	Ergeshov (KGZ); W 3–1	Gündüz (TUR); W 3–0	Zholudev (KAZ); W 4–1	Hodaei (IRI); L 3–4	2nd place, silver medalist(s)
Amir Hossein Hodaei	Men's singles	Bye	Ismail (MDV); W 3–0	Kalaja (ALB); W 3–0	Habach (LBN); W 3–1	Al-Khadrawi (KSA); W 4–1	Alamian (IRI); W 4–3	1st place, gold medalist(s)
Shima Safaei	Women's singles	—N/a	Abdulhamidova (AZE); W 3–2	Ismailova (TJK); W 3–1	Yılmaz (TUR); L 1–3	Did not advance		5
Neda Shahsavari	Women's singles	—N/a	Bye	Akadiri (BEN); W 3–0	Mou (BAN); W 3–0	Altınkaya (TUR); W 4–3	Yılmaz (TUR); L 2–4	2nd place, silver medalist(s)

Team

Athlete	Event	Preliminary round				Quarterfinal	Semifinal	Final	Rank
Athlete	Event	Round 1	Round 2	Round 3	Rank	Quarterfinal	Semifinal	Final	Rank
Nima Alamian; Noshad Alamian; Amir Hossein Hodaei; Afshin Norouzi	Men's team	Bangladesh; W 3–0	Maldives; W 3–0	—N/a	1 Q	Kyrgyzstan; W 3–0	Turkey; W 3–0	Saudi Arabia; W 3–0	1st place, gold medalist(s)
Mahshid Ashtari; Parinaz Hajiloo; Shima Safaei; Neda Shahsavari	Women's team	Uzbekistan; W 3–0	Bangladesh; W 3–0	Azerbaijan; W 3–0	1 Q	—N/a	Maldives; W 3–0	Turkey; W 3–2	1st place, gold medalist(s)

==== Para table tennis ====
Individual

Athlete	Event	Preliminary round				Quarterfinal	Semifinal	Final	Rank
Athlete	Event	Round 1	Round 2	Round 3	Rank	Quarterfinal	Semifinal	Final	Rank
Amin Sadeghian	Men's singles class 4	Rehman (PAK); W 3–0	Boutlelis (ALG); W 3–0	—N/a	1 Q	Atamuratov (UZB); W 3–0	Öztürk (TUR); L 0–3	Did not advance	3rd place, bronze medalist(s)
Hamid Reza Sheikhzadeh	Men's singles class 4	Öztürk (TUR); L 0–3	Kheireddine (ALG); W 3–0	—N/a	2 Q	Rehman (PAK); W 3–1	Turan (TUR); L 0–3	Did not advance	3rd place, bronze medalist(s)
Javad Fouladi	Men's singles class 5	Çalışkan (TUR); L 2–3	Al-Fararja (PLE); W 3–0	Khaldi (ALG); W 3–0	2 Q	—N/a	Öztürk (TUR); L 2–3	Did not advance	3rd place, bronze medalist(s)
Mehdi Masoumi	Men's singles class 5	Öztürk (TUR); L 1–3	El-Hachemi (ALG); W 3–0	Kujabi (GAM); W 3–0	2 Q	—N/a	Çalışkan (TUR); L 1–3	Did not advance	3rd place, bronze medalist(s)
Somayyeh Mostafavi	Women's singles class 9	Round robin Kavas (TUR); L 0–3	Round robin Ishchenko (TJK); L 0–3	Round robin Kalahroudi (IRI); L WO		—N/a			4
Pegah Kalahroudi	Women's singles class 9	Round robin Ishchenko (TJK); L 0–3	Round robin Kavas (TUR); L 0–3	Round robin Mostafavi (IRI); W WO		—N/a			3rd place, bronze medalist(s)
Fatemeh Etesaminia	Women's singles class 10	Round robin Mohammadi (IRI); L 0–3	Round robin Ertiş (TUR); L 0–3	Round robin Demir (TUR); L 0–3		Round robin Suncheleyeva (AZE); W 3–0	—N/a		4
Fatemeh Mohammadi	Women's singles class 10	Round robin Etesaminia (IRI); W 3–0	Round robin Suncheleyeva (AZE); W 3–0	Round robin Demir (TUR); L 0–3		Round robin Ertiş (TUR); W 3–1	—N/a		2nd place, silver medalist(s)

Team

Athlete	Event	Round robin			Rank
Athlete	Event	Round 1	Round 2	Round 3	Rank
Amin Sadeghian; Hamid Reza Sheikhzadeh	Men's team class 4	Pakistan/ Uzbekistan; W 2–0	Turkey; L 0–2	Algeria; W 2–0	2nd place, silver medalist(s)
Javad Fouladi; Mehdi Masoumi	Men's team class 5	Turkey; L 0–2	Palestine; W 2–0	Algeria; W 2–0	2nd place, silver medalist(s)
Fatemeh Etesaminia; Fatemeh Mohammadi	Women's team class 10	Turkey; L 0–2	Azerbaijan/ Tajikistan; W 2–0	—N/a	2nd place, silver medalist(s)

=== Taekwondo ===
Athlete	Event	Round of 32	Round of 16	Quarterfinal	Semifinal	Final	Rank
Mehdi Haji Mousaei	Men's 54 kg	—N/a	Khudayberdiev (UZB); W 2–1	Tan (MAS); W 2–0	Dağdelen (TUR); L 0–2	Did not advance	3rd place, bronze medalist(s)
Hossein Lotfi	Men's 58 kg	Konaté (CIV); W WO	Rezaee (AFG); W 2–0	Ababakirov (KAZ); W 2–1	Magomedov (AZE); W 2–0	Polat (TUR); W 2–0	1st place, gold medalist(s)
Mohammad Sadegh Dehghani	Men's 63 kg	Bye	Al-Mabrouk (KSA); W 2–0	Hantoli (PLE); W 2–0	Recber (TUR); L 0–2	Did not advance	3rd place, bronze medalist(s)
Danial Bozorgi	Men's 68 kg	—N/a	Fofana (MLI); W 2–0	Rashitov (UZB); L 0–2	Did not advance		5
Amir Mohammad Bakhshi	Men's 74 kg	Bye	van Dijk (SUR); W 2–0	Al-Hlo (JOR); W 2–0	Jaysunov (UZB); W 2–1	Bahlool (PLE); W 2–0	1st place, gold medalist(s)
Mehran Barkhordari	Men's 80 kg	—N/a	Diallo (GUI); W 2–0	Adilkhanov (KAZ); W 2–1	Salaev (UZB); L 1–2	Did not advance	3rd place, bronze medalist(s)
Ali Ahmadi	Men's 87 kg	—N/a	Bye	Rafalovich (UZB); W 2–0	Biçer (TUR); W 2–0	Sbeihi (JOR); W 2–1	1st place, gold medalist(s)
Alireza Nadalian	Men's +87 kg	—N/a	Bazzar (PLE); W RSC	Radjabov (UZB); W 2–0	Ateşli (TUR); W 2–0	Bassel (MAR); W 2–0	1st place, gold medalist(s)
Ghazal Soltani	Women's 49 kg	—N/a	Bye	Khawar (PAK); W 2–0	El-Aasal (MAR); W 2–0	Yıldırım (TUR); L 1–2	2nd place, silver medalist(s)
Nahid Kiani	Women's 53 kg	Bye	Oimatova (TJK); W 2–0	Abutaleb (KSA); W 2–1	Kayumova (UZB); W 2–0	El-Bouchti (MAR); W 2–0	1st place, gold medalist(s)
Nastaran Valizadeh	Women's 57 kg	—N/a	Bye	Aimukasheva (KAZ); W 2–1	İlgün (TUR); L 1–2	Did not advance	3rd place, bronze medalist(s)
Narges Mirnourollahi	Women's 62 kg	—N/a	Bye	Koutoubali (CHA); W 2–0	Kayır (TUR); W 2–0	Sadikova (UZB); L 0–2	2nd place, silver medalist(s)
Zeinab Esmaeili	Women's 67 kg	—N/a	Sobirjonova (UZB); W 2–1	Evci (TUR); W 2–1	Fatnassi (QAT); W 2–0	Azizova (AZE); L 0–2	2nd place, silver medalist(s)
Zahra Pouresmaeil	Women's 73 kg	—N/a		Uzunçavdar (TUR); L 0–2	Did not advance		5
Akram Khodabandeh	Women's +73 kg	—N/a		Abu Al-Haj (JOR); W RSC	Kuş (TUR); W 2–1	Osipova (UZB); L 1–2	2nd place, silver medalist(s)

=== Volleyball ===
Team	Event	Preliminary round				Semifinal	Final	Rank
Team	Event	Round 1	Round 2	Round 3	Rank	Semifinal	Final	Rank
Iran	Men	Qatar; W 3–0 (25–15, 26–24, 25–23)	Pakistan; W 3–0 (25–18, 28–26, 25–18)	Turkey; L 2–3 (25–23, 25–22, 32–34, 21–25, 8–15)	1 Q	Azerbaijan; W 3–0 (25–17, 25–20, 25–11)	Cameroon; W 3–1 (25–16, 18–25, 25–23, 25–14)	1st place, gold medalist(s)
Iran	Women	Uzbekistan; W 3–1 (25–15, 25–16, 26–28, 25–16)	Turkey; L 0–3 (20–25, 15–25, 17–25)	—N/a	2 Q	Azerbaijan; W 3–1 (25–18, 18–25, 25–16, 25–22)	Turkey; L 0–3 (16–25, 14–25, 15–25)	2nd place, silver medalist(s)
Roster – Men: Fazel Pajouman; Esmaeil Mosafer; Mohammad Valizadeh; Arman Rahmani; Amir Reza Sarlak; Esmaeil Talebi; Mehrab Maleki; Shahrouz Homayounfarmanesh; Bardia Saadat; Ali Ramezani; Ehsan Daneshdoust; Abolfazl Gholipour; Ali Hajipour; Pouria Yali; Coach: Azim Jazideh Roster – Women: Aytak Salamat; Zahra Karimi; Mohaddeseh Moshtaghi; Shabnam Alikhani; Mahsa Saberi; Maedeh Borhani; Mahsa Kadkhoda; Fatemeh Amini; Negar Kiani; Pouran Zare; Tahmineh Dargazani; Elaheh Poursaleh; Reihaneh Karimi; Zahra Moghani; Coach: (Italy) Alessandra Campedelli

=== Weightlifting ===
Athlete	Event	Snatch		Clean & Jerk		Total	
Athlete	Event	Result	Rank	Result	Rank	Result	Rank
Hafez Ghashghaei	Men's 67 kg	127	9	172	3rd place, bronze medalist(s)	299	5
Mirmostafa Javadi	Men's 81 kg	163	2nd place, silver medalist(s)	201	1st place, gold medalist(s)	364	1st place, gold medalist(s)
Hossein Soltani	Men's 81 kg	158	3rd place, bronze medalist(s)	192	3rd place, bronze medalist(s)	350	4
Reza Beiranvand	Men's 96 kg	167	1st place, gold medalist(s)	194	1st place, gold medalist(s)	361	1st place, gold medalist(s)
Amir Hoghoughi	Men's 102 kg	165	5	211	4	376	5
Rasoul Motamedi	Men's 102 kg	177	1st place, gold medalist(s)	223	1st place, gold medalist(s)	400	1st place, gold medalist(s)
Peyman Jan	Men's 109 kg	166	3rd place, bronze medalist(s)	216	2nd place, silver medalist(s)	382	2nd place, silver medalist(s)
Mehdi Karami	Men's 109 kg	173	2nd place, silver medalist(s)	207	3rd place, bronze medalist(s)	380	3rd place, bronze medalist(s)
Alireza Yousefi	Men's +109 kg	181	3rd place, bronze medalist(s)	230	2nd place, silver medalist(s)	411	2nd place, silver medalist(s)
Poupak Basami	Women's 55 kg	71	3rd place, bronze medalist(s)	94	3rd place, bronze medalist(s)	165	3rd place, bronze medalist(s)
Fatemeh Keshavarz	Women's 59 kg	80	5	95	4	175	4
Shina Amani	Women's 64 kg	81	5	95	5	176	5
Forough Younesi	Women's 64 kg	76	6	95	6	171	6
Elaheh Razzaghi	Women's 71 kg	85	4	105	4	190	4
Abrisham Arjomandkhah	Women's 76 kg	91	4	111	5	202	5
Elham Hosseini	Women's 81 kg	100	1st place, gold medalist(s)	123	3rd place, bronze medalist(s)	223	3rd place, bronze medalist(s)
Fatemeh Yousefi	Women's +87 kg	94	5	127	5	221	5

=== Wrestling ===
Freestyle

Athlete	Event	Round of 32	Round of 16	Quarterfinal		Semifinal	Final	Rank
Reza Momeni	Men's 57 kg	—N/a	Bye	Vohidov (TJK); L 4–6		Did not advance		7
Majid Dastan	Men's 61 kg	—N/a	Diatta (SEN); W 10–0	Myrzanazar Uulu (KGZ); W 9–4		Bazarganov (AZE); L 0–10	3rd place match Bilal (PAK); W 6–3	3rd place, bronze medalist(s)
Morteza Ghiasi	Men's 65 kg	—N/a	Alaca (TUR); W 6–2	Aliyev (AZE); L 4–8		Did not advance	3rd place match Jalolov (UZB); W 4–2	3rd place, bronze medalist(s)
Hossein Abouzari	Men's 70 kg	—N/a	Spartan (UGA); W Fall (7–0)	Ndum (GBS); W 10–0		Otakhonov (UZB); W 3–0	Akmataliev (KGZ); L 0–6	2nd place, silver medalist(s)
Mohammad Sadegh Firouzpour	Men's 74 kg	—N/a	Eryılmaz (TUR); W 9–6	Isakov (JOR); W 13–4		Kaipanov (KAZ); W 3–2	Bayramov (AZE); L 1–2	2nd place, silver medalist(s)
Ali Savadkouhi	Men's 79 kg	—N/a	Masakwe (UGA); W Fall (11–0)	Koshkinbayev (KAZ); W 3–1		Omarov (AZE); W 7–0	Akdeniz (TUR); W 12–6	1st place, gold medalist(s)
Alireza Karimi	Men's 86 kg	—N/a		Karypbaev (KGZ); W 10–0		Benferdjallah (ALG); W 10–0	Abakarov (AZE); W RET (9–0)	1st place, gold medalist(s)
Ahmad Bazri	Men's 92 kg	—N/a		Baigenzheyev (KAZ); W 13–2		Nurmagomedov (AZE); W 6–6	Yaylacı (TUR); W 7–1	1st place, gold medalist(s)
Mojtaba Goleij	Men's 97 kg	—N/a	Kubatov (KGZ); W 10–0	Mahmadbekov (TJK); W 10–0		Ibragimov (KAZ); W 13–2	Sessiz (TUR); W RET (2–0)	1st place, gold medalist(s)
Mehdi Hashemi	Men's 125 kg	Group round Hamidli (AZE); W 9–0	Group round Turdubekov (KGZ); W 10–0	Group round Rakhimov (UZB); W 5–4	Rank; 1 Q	Saparow (TKM); W 11–0	Ercan (TUR); W 8–0	1st place, gold medalist(s)

Greco-Roman

Athlete	Event	Round of 32	Round of 16	Quarterfinal		Semifinal	Final	Rank
Mohammad Hosseinvand	Men's 55 kg	—N/a		Uzun (TUR); W 7–0		Ortikboev (UZB); L 0–9	3rd place match Azizov (TJK); L 0–8	5
Omid Arami	Men's 60 kg	—N/a	Bye	Fajari (MAR); W 8–0		Sharshenbekov (KGZ); L 1–5	3rd place match Yusupov (UZB); L 1–8	5
Shirzad Beheshti	Men's 63 kg	—N/a	Bye	Mirzoradzhabov (TJK); W 3–1		Tirkashev (UZB); W 4–3	Sharshenbekov (KGZ); W 4–2	1st place, gold medalist(s)
Mohammad Javad Rezaei	Men's 67 kg	—N/a	Bye	Jafarov (AZE); L 3–10		Did not advance	3rd place match Nobatow (TKM); W 11–0	3rd place, bronze medalist(s)
Mohammad Reza Rostami	Men's 72 kg	—N/a		Ochilov (TJK); W 9–0		Rakhmatov (UZB); W 7–4	Ganizade (AZE); W 9–8	1st place, gold medalist(s)
Amin Kavianinejad	Men's 77 kg	—N/a	Bye	Suleymanov (AZE); L 0–4		Did not advance	3rd place match Maafi (TUN); W 1–1	3rd place, bronze medalist(s)
Rasoul Garmsiri	Men's 82 kg	—N/a	Rasulov (UZB); L 2–5	Did not advance				8
Ramin Taheri	Men's 87 kg	Group round Öwelekow (TKM); W 8–0	Group round Küçükosman (TUR); W 6–0	Group round Berdimuratov (UZB); L 5–5	Rank; 2 Q	Azisbekov (KGZ); W 1–1	Berdimuratov (UZB); L 2–11	2nd place, silver medalist(s)
Mehdi Bali	Men's 97 kg	—N/a	Bye	Niftullayev (AZE); W 8–0		Dzhuzupbekov (KGZ); L 3–7	3rd place match Boudjemline (ALG); W 4–0	3rd place, bronze medalist(s)
Ali Akbar Yousefi	Men's 130 kg	—N/a	Group round Yıldırım (TUR); W 9–5	Group round Kim (KGZ); W 6–4	Rank; 1 Q	Savenko (KAZ); W 9–1	Yıldırım (TUR); W 3–2	1st place, gold medalist(s)
