= Fencing at the 2021 Islamic Solidarity Games =

Fencing competition

- Venue: Selcuk University 19 Mayıs Sport Hall
- Dates: 14–17 August 2022

Fencing at the 2021 Islamic Solidarity Games was held in Konya, Turkey from 14 to 17 August 2022 in Selcuk University 19 Mayıs Sport Hall.

The Games were originally scheduled to take place from 20 to 29 August 2021 in Konya, Turkey. In May 2020, the Islamic Solidarity Sports Federation (ISSF), who are responsible for the direction and control of the Islamic Solidarity Games, postponed the games as the 2020 Summer Olympics were postponed to July and August 2021, due to the global COVID-19 pandemic.

== Medal table ==
Rank	Nation	Gold	Silver	Bronze	Total
1	Turkey (TUR)*	6	4	2	12
2	Uzbekistan (UZB)	2	3	9	14
3	Azerbaijan (AZE)	2	2	2	6
4	Iran (IRI)	1	3	2	6
5	Kyrgyzstan (KGZ)	1	0	1	2
6	Qatar (QAT)	0	0	2	2
Totals (6 entries)		12	12	18	42

== Medal summary ==
=== Men ===
Event	Gold	Silver	Bronze
Individual épée	Roman Petrov; Kyrgyzstan	Ruslan Hasanov; Azerbaijan	Nodirbek Muminov; Uzbekistan
Individual épée	Roman Petrov; Kyrgyzstan	Ruslan Hasanov; Azerbaijan	Fayzulla Alimov; Uzbekistan
Team épée	Azerbaijan; Kanan Aliyev; Barat Guliyev; Ruslan Hasanov	Iran; Mohammad Rezaei; Mohammad Rezaei; Mohammad Reza Vosoughi	Uzbekistan; Roman Aleksandrov; Fayzulla Alimov; Nodirbek Muminov; Javohirbek Nurmatov
Individual foil	Mukhammad Yusuf Asranov; Uzbekistan	Martino Minuto; Turkey	Ilyas Molina; Uzbekistan
Individual foil	Mukhammad Yusuf Asranov; Uzbekistan	Martino Minuto; Turkey	Doniyor Sadullaev; Uzbekistan
Team foil	Uzbekistan; Mukhammad Yusuf Asranov; Ilyas Molina; Doniyor Sadullaev; Akhmadillokhon Solikhojiev	Turkey; Mustafa Burak Çufadar; Alp Eyüpoğlu; Martino Minuto; Utku Özyalçın	Qatar; Khaled Hussein; Abdalla Khalifa; Ali Owaida
Individual sabre	Enver Yıldırım; Turkey	Ali Pakdaman; Iran	Musa Aymuratov; Uzbekistan
Individual sabre	Enver Yıldırım; Turkey	Ali Pakdaman; Iran	Mohammad Rahbari; Iran
Team sabre	Iran; Mohammad Fotouhi; Ali Pakdaman; Mohammad Rahbari; Nima Zahedi	Turkey; Muhammed Anasız; Tolga Aslan; Kerem Çağlayan; Enver Yıldırım	Uzbekistan; Islambek Abdazov; Musa Aymuratov; Zukhriddin Kodirov; Sherzod Mamutov

=== Women ===
Event	Gold	Silver	Bronze
Individual épée	Aleyna Ertürk; Turkey	Shahzoda Egamberdieva; Uzbekistan	Azam Bakhti; Iran
Individual épée	Aleyna Ertürk; Turkey	Shahzoda Egamberdieva; Uzbekistan	Kamilia Abdyl-Khamitova; Kyrgyzstan
Team épée	Turkey; Lal Erman; Aleyna Ertürk; Gökçe Günaç; Damlanur Sönmüş	Iran; Azam Bakhti; Paria Mahrokh; Mahsa Pourrahmati	Uzbekistan; Shahzoda Egamberdieva; Dilnaz Murzataeva; Sevara Rakhimova; Marjona Zubaydulloeva
Individual foil	İrem Karamete; Turkey	Alisa İsbir; Turkey	Firuze Ayşen Güneş; Turkey
Individual foil	İrem Karamete; Turkey	Alisa İsbir; Turkey	Umida Ilyosova; Uzbekistan
Team foil	Turkey; Almila Birçe Durukan; Firuze Ayşen Güneş; Alisa İsbir; İrem Karamete	Uzbekistan; Ilayda Gedikli; Umida Ilyosova; Komila Mirzaeva; Marjona Usmonova	Qatar; Lina Al-Boinin; Haya Diab; Sara Diab
Individual sabre	Iryna Shchukla; Turkey	Palina Kaspiarovich; Azerbaijan	Valeriya Bolshakova; Azerbaijan
Individual sabre	Iryna Shchukla; Turkey	Palina Kaspiarovich; Azerbaijan	Sabina Karimova; Azerbaijan
Team sabre	Azerbaijan; Anna Bashta; Valeriya Bolshakova; Sevil Bunyatova; Sabina Karimova	Uzbekistan; Zaynab Dayibekova; Sevinch Ismoilova; Paola Pliego; Aysuliu Usnatdinova	Turkey; Aylin Çakır; Nil Güngör; Iryna Shchukla; Pınar Miray Şişik

== Participating nations ==
141 athletes from 18 countries participated:

1. Azerbaijan (8)
2. Bangladesh (4)
3. Iran (17)
4. Jordan (6)
5. Kazakhstan (4)
6. Kyrgyzstan (5)
7. Lebanon (6)
8. Mali (3)
9. Morocco (1)
10. Pakistan (1)
11. Qatar (7)
12. Saudi Arabia (16)
13. Senegal (6)
14. Tajikistan (1)
15. Turkey (24)
16. United Arab Emirates (5)
17. Uzbekistan (24)
18. Yemen (3)
