= Gabon at the 2021 Islamic Solidarity Games =

- IOC code: GAB
- NOC: Gabonese Olympic Committee

in Konya, Turkey
- Medals: Gold 0 Silver 0 Bronze 0 Total 0

Islamic Solidarity Games appearances
- 2005; 2013; 2017; 2021; 2025

Gabon participated in the 2021 Islamic Solidarity Games held in Konya, Turkey from 9 to 18 August 2022.

The games had been rescheduled several times. In May 2021, the ISSF postponed the event to August 2022 citing the COVID-19 pandemic situation in the participating countries.

== Medalists ==
Medal	Name	Sport	Event	Date

Medals by sport
Sport	1st place, gold medalist(s)	2nd place, silver medalist(s)	3rd place, bronze medalist(s)	Total
Archery	0	0	0	0
Athletics	0	0	0	0
Bocce	0	0	0	0
Gymnastics	0	0	0	0
Karate	0	0	0	0
Swimming	0	0	0	0
Taekwondo	0	0	0	0
Volleyball	0	0	0	0
Weightlifting	0	0	0	0
Wrestling	0	0	0	0
Total	0	0	0	0

== Basketball ==
=== Men's 3x3 tournament ===
Group C

Pos	Team	Pld	W	L	PF	PA	PD	Qualification
1	Turkey	0	0	0	0	0	0	Quarterfinals
2	Azerbaijan	0	0	0	0	0	0	Quarterfinals
3	Morocco	0	0	0	0	0	0	9–12th place semifinals
4	Mali	0	0	0	0	0	0	
5	Gabon	0	0	0	0	0	0	

Source: Konya 2021
Rules for classification: 1) Wins; 2) Head-to-head record; 3) Points scored.
