= Taekwondo at the 2021 Islamic Solidarity Games =

Islamic Solidarity Games

- Venue: Selcuk University 19 Mayis Sport Hall
- Location: Konya, Turkey
- Dates: 9–12 August 2022
- Competitors: 236 from 39 nations

Taekwondo at the 2021 Islamic Solidarity Games was held in Konya, Turkey from 9 to 12 August 2022.

== Medal table ==
Rank	Nation	Gold	Silver	Bronze	Total
1	Iran (IRI)	5	4	4	13
2	Uzbekistan (UZB)	4	0	4	8
3	Morocco (MAR)	3	2	4	9
4	Turkey (TUR)*	2	5	7	14
5	Azerbaijan (AZE)	1	2	2	5
6	Niger (NIG)	1	0	1	2
7	Lebanon (LBN)	0	1	2	3
8	Jordan (JOR)	0	1	1	2
9	Palestine (PLE)	0	1	0	1
10	Kazakhstan (KAZ)	0	0	3	3
11	Burkina Faso (BUR)	0	0	1	1
11	Qatar (QAT)	0	0	1	1
11	Saudi Arabia (KSA)	0	0	1	1
11	Senegal (SEN)	0	0	1	1
Totals (14 entries)		16	16	32	64

== Medalists ==
=== Men ===
Event	Gold	Silver	Bronze
Finweight −54 kg	Mahamadou Amadou; Niger	Deniz Dağdelen; Turkey	Jasurbek Kluchov; Kazakhstan
Finweight −54 kg	Mahamadou Amadou; Niger	Deniz Dağdelen; Turkey	Mehdi Haji Mousaei; Iran
Flyweight −58 kg	Hossein Lotfi; Iran	Görkem Polat; Turkey	Gashim Magomedov; Azerbaijan
Flyweight −58 kg	Hossein Lotfi; Iran	Görkem Polat; Turkey	Nouridine Issaka Garba; Niger
Bantamweight −63 kg	Abdelbasset Wasfi; Morocco	Hakan Reçber; Turkey	Niyaz Pulatov; Uzbekistan
Bantamweight −63 kg	Abdelbasset Wasfi; Morocco	Hakan Reçber; Turkey	Mohammad Sadegh Dehghani; Iran
Featherweight −68 kg	Ulugbek Rashitov; Uzbekistan	Javad Aghayev; Azerbaijan	Ferhat Can Kavurat; Turkey
Featherweight −68 kg	Ulugbek Rashitov; Uzbekistan	Javad Aghayev; Azerbaijan	Lo Mouhamadou Mansour; Senegal
Lightweight −74 kg	Amir Mohammad Bakhshi; Iran	Ahmad Bahlool; Palestine	Muhammed Emin Yıldız; Turkey
Lightweight −74 kg	Amir Mohammad Bakhshi; Iran	Ahmad Bahlool; Palestine	Jasurbek Jaysunov; Uzbekistan
Welterweight −80 kg	Shukhrat Salaev; Uzbekistan	Hüseyin Kartal; Turkey	Mehran Barkhordari; Iran
Welterweight −80 kg	Shukhrat Salaev; Uzbekistan	Hüseyin Kartal; Turkey	Ali Mabrouk Almabrouk; Saudi Arabia
Middleweight −87 kg	Ali Ahmadi; Iran	Fahed Sbeihi; Jordan	Enbiya Taha Biçer; Turkey
Middleweight −87 kg	Ali Ahmadi; Iran	Fahed Sbeihi; Jordan	Tarek Moussalli; Lebanon
Heavyweight +87 kg	Alireza Nadalian; Iran	Ayoub Bassel; Morocco	Bauyrzhan Khassenov; Kazakhstan
Heavyweight +87 kg	Alireza Nadalian; Iran	Ayoub Bassel; Morocco	Emre Kutalmış Ateşli; Turkey

=== Women ===
Event	Gold	Silver	Bronze
Finweight −46 kg	Soukaina Sahib; Morocco	Minaya Akbarova; Azerbaijan	Ida Kevine Bama; Burkina Faso
Finweight −46 kg	Soukaina Sahib; Morocco	Minaya Akbarova; Azerbaijan	Zukhrakhon Tojimatova; Uzbekistan
Flyweight −49 kg	Rukiye Yıldırım; Turkey	Ghazal Soltani; Iran	Patimat Abakarova; Azerbaijan
Flyweight −49 kg	Rukiye Yıldırım; Turkey	Ghazal Soltani; Iran	Nezha El-Aasal; Morocco
Bantamweight −53 kg	Nahid Kiani; Iran	Oumaima El-Bouchti; Morocco	Charos Kayumova; Uzbekistan
Bantamweight −53 kg	Nahid Kiani; Iran	Oumaima El-Bouchti; Morocco	Zeliha Ağrıs; Turkey
Featherweight −57 kg	Nada Laaraj; Morocco	Hatice Kübra İlgün; Turkey	Laetitia Aoun; Lebanon
Featherweight −57 kg	Nada Laaraj; Morocco	Hatice Kübra İlgün; Turkey	Nastaran Valizadeh; Iran
Lightweight −62 kg	Feruza Sadikova; Uzbekistan	Narges Mirnourollahi; Iran	Khoulal Merieme; Morocco
Lightweight −62 kg	Feruza Sadikova; Uzbekistan	Narges Mirnourollahi; Iran	İkra Kayır; Turkey
Welterweight −67 kg	Farida Azizova; Azerbaijan	Zeinab Esmaeili; Iran	Safia Salih; Morocco
Welterweight −67 kg	Farida Azizova; Azerbaijan	Zeinab Esmaeili; Iran	Maram Fatnassi; Qatar
Middleweight −73 kg	Sude Yaren Uzunçavdar; Turkey	Selman Ward; Lebanon	Cansel Deniz; Kazakhstan
Middleweight −73 kg	Sude Yaren Uzunçavdar; Turkey	Selman Ward; Lebanon	Rama Abo-Alrub; Jordan
Heavyweight +73 kg	Svetlana Osipova; Uzbekistan	Akram Khodabandeh; Iran	Nafia Kuş; Turkey
Heavyweight +73 kg	Svetlana Osipova; Uzbekistan	Akram Khodabandeh; Iran	Fatima-Ezzahra Aboufaras; Morocco

== Participating nations ==
236 taekwondo player from 39 countries:

1. Afghanistan (3)
2. Albania (2)
3. Azerbaijan (14)
4. Burkina Faso (2)
5. Cameroon (3)
6. Chad (8)
7. Comoros (1)
8. Ivory Coast (3)
9. Gabon (3)
10. The Gambia (1)
11. Guinea (2)
12. Guinea-Bissau (2)
13. Indonesia (6)
14. Iran (15)
15. Jordan (16)
16. Kazakhstan (11)
17. Kuwait (1)
18. Kyrgyzstan (5)
19. Lebanon (12)
20. Malaysia (4)
21. Mali (3)
22. Morocco (13)
23. Niger (3)
24. Pakistan (11)
25. Palestine (6)
26. Qatar (6)
27. Saudi Arabia (7)
28. Senegal (7)
29. Sierra Leone (2)
30. Somalia (1)
31. Sudan (7)
32. Suriname (3)
33. Tajikistan (5)
34. Tunisia (7)
35. Uganda (3)
36. Yemen (2)
37. Turkey (16)
38. United Arab Emirates (4)
39. Uzbekistan (16)

== Gallery ==
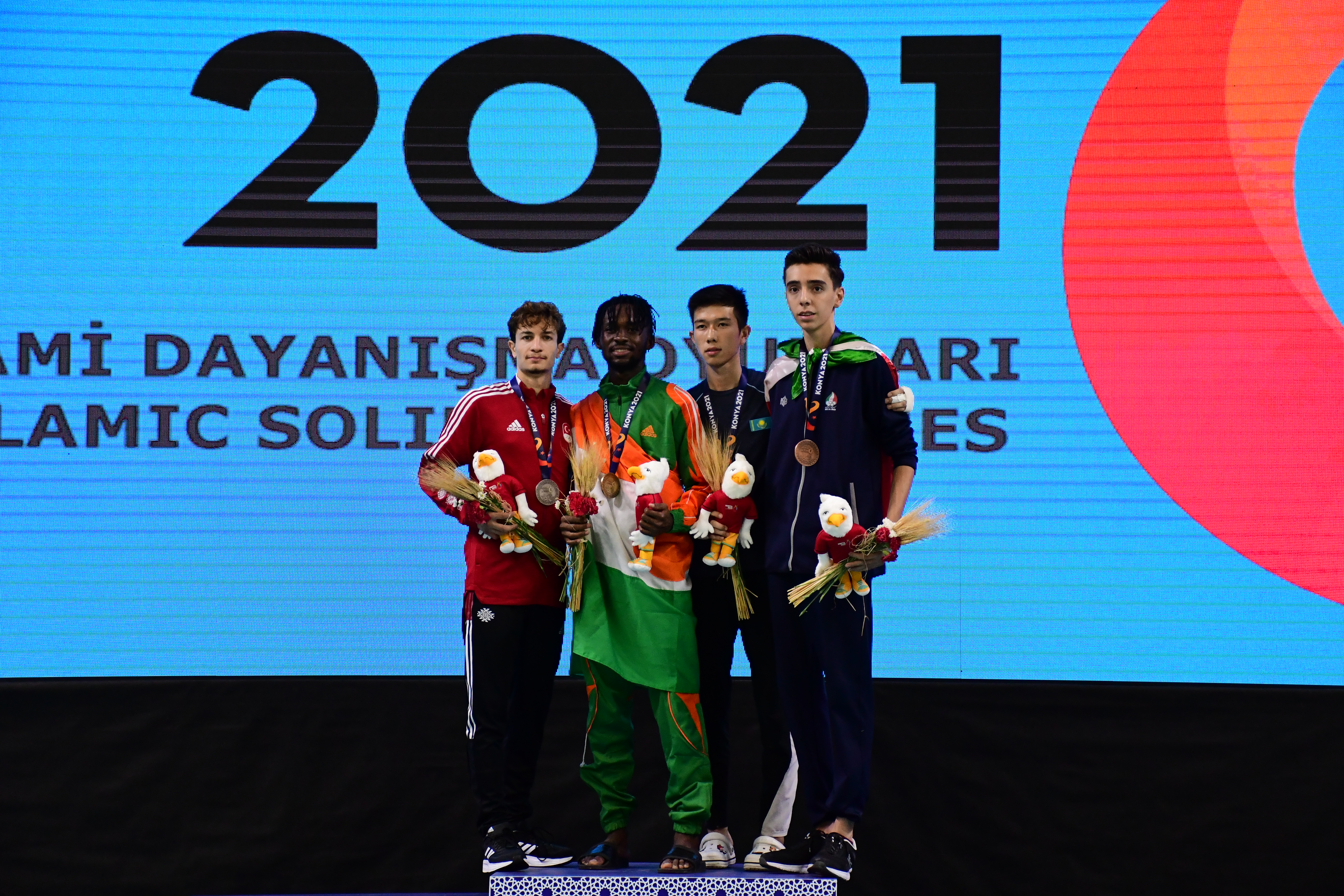
Men 54 kg Medal Ceremony

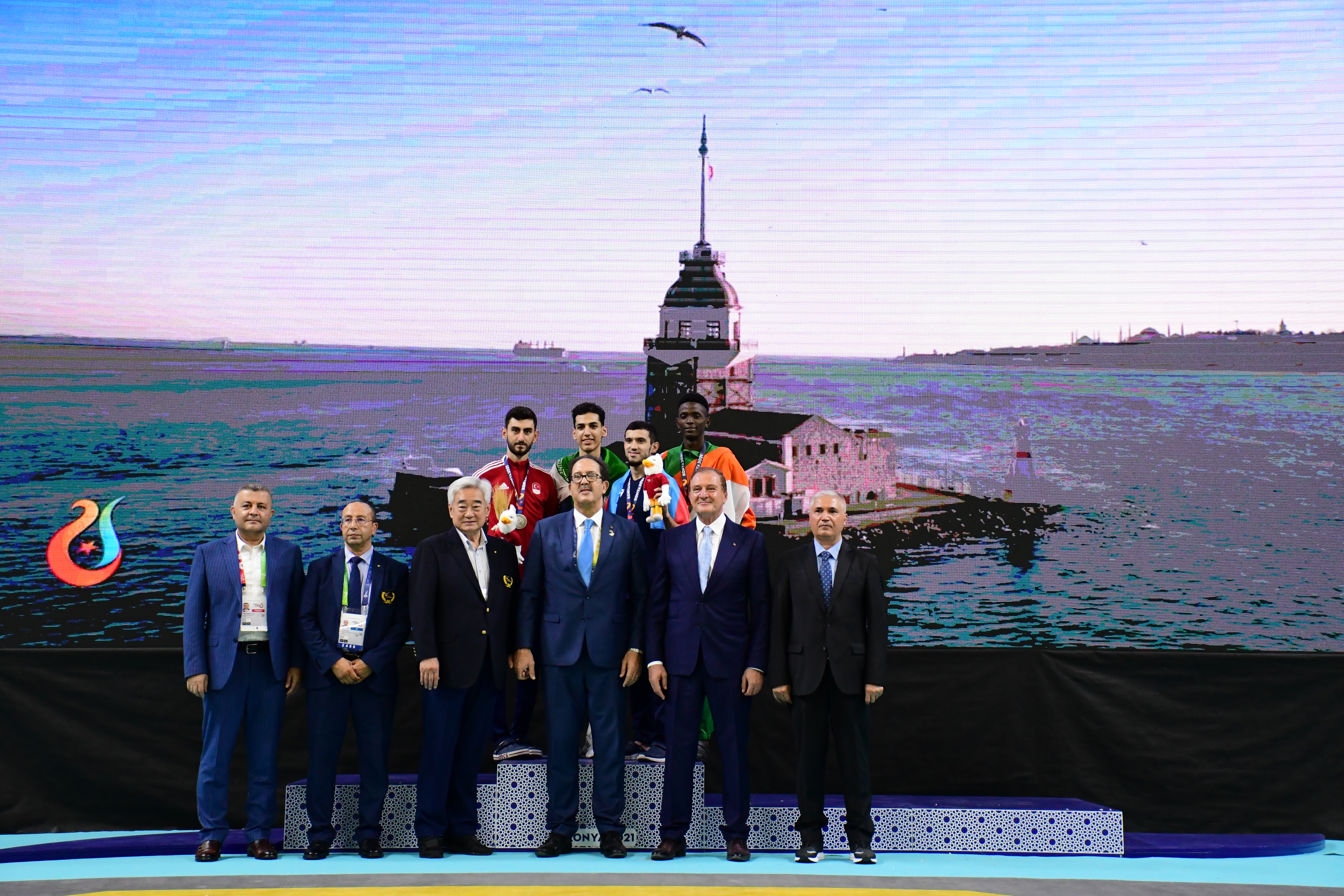
Men 58 kg Medal Ceremony

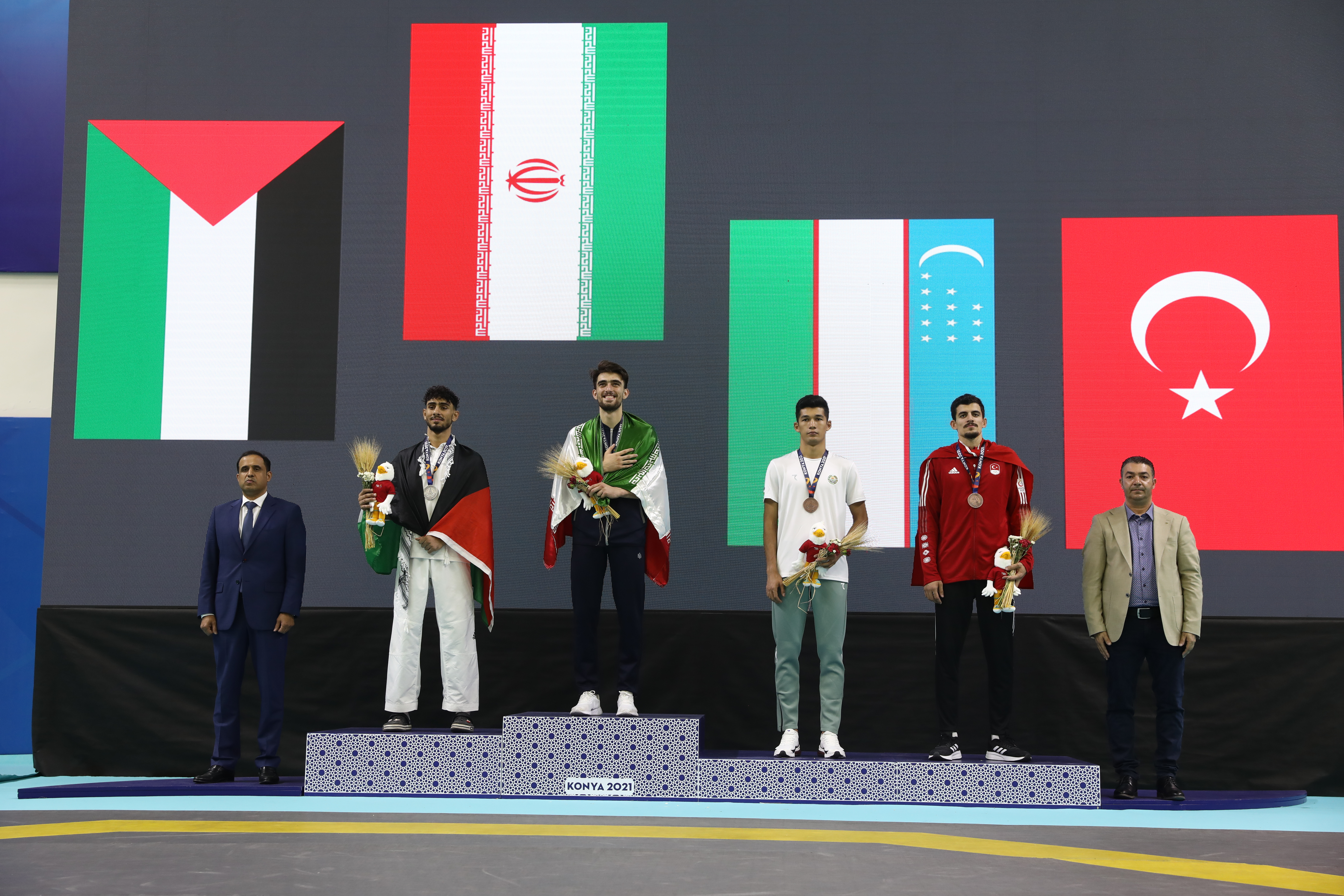
Men 74 kg Medal Ceremony

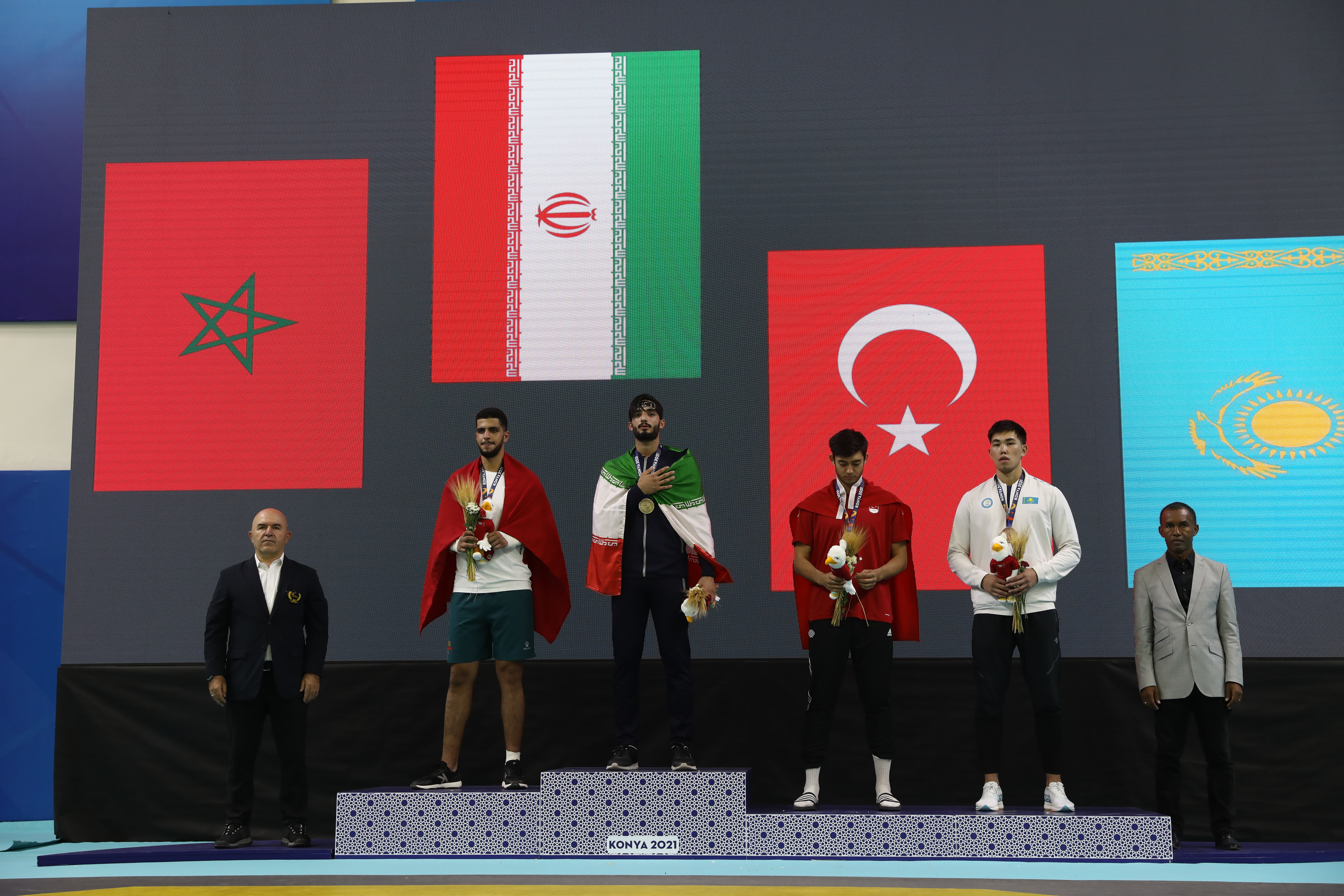
Men +87 kg Medal Ceremony

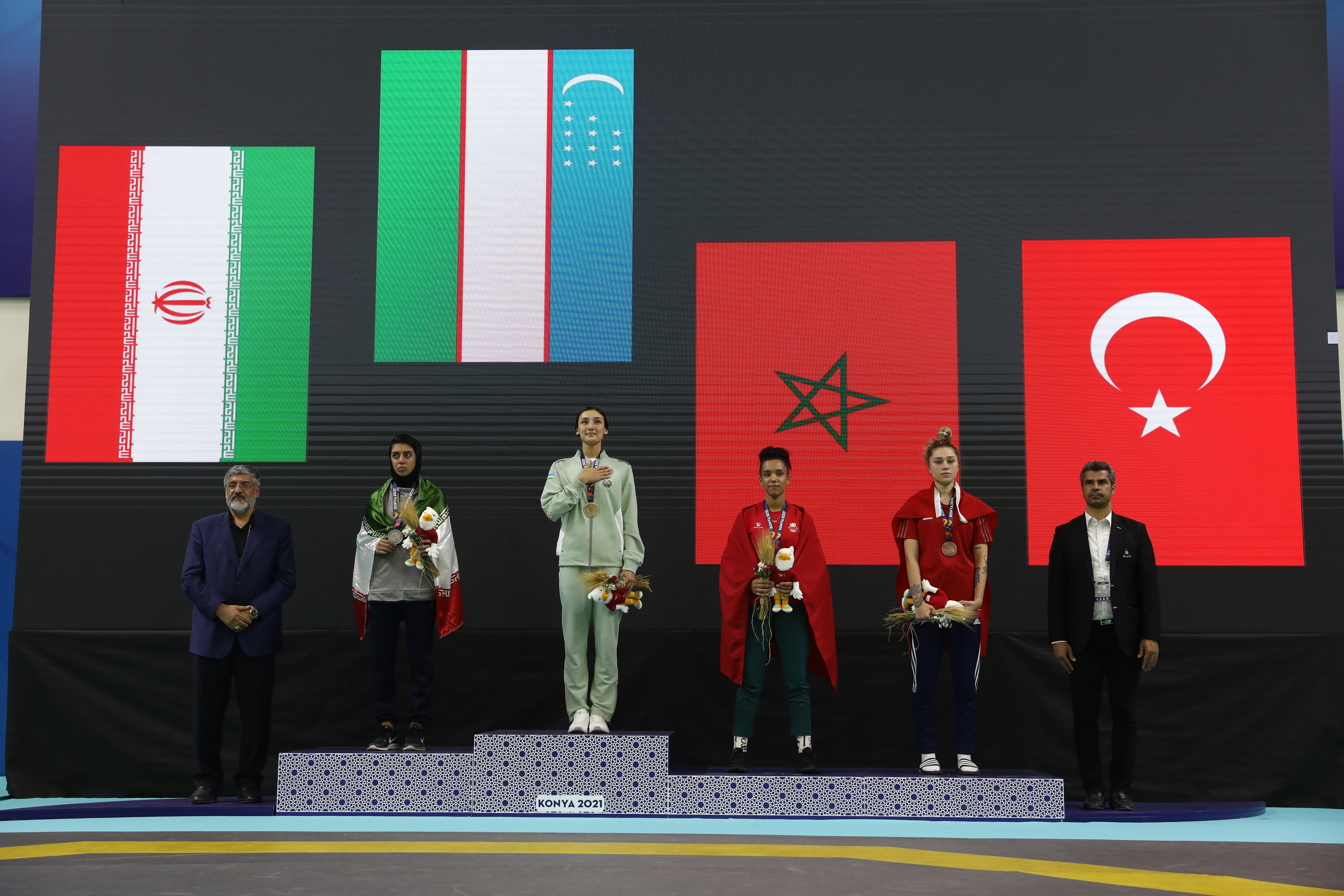
Women 62 kg Medal Ceremony

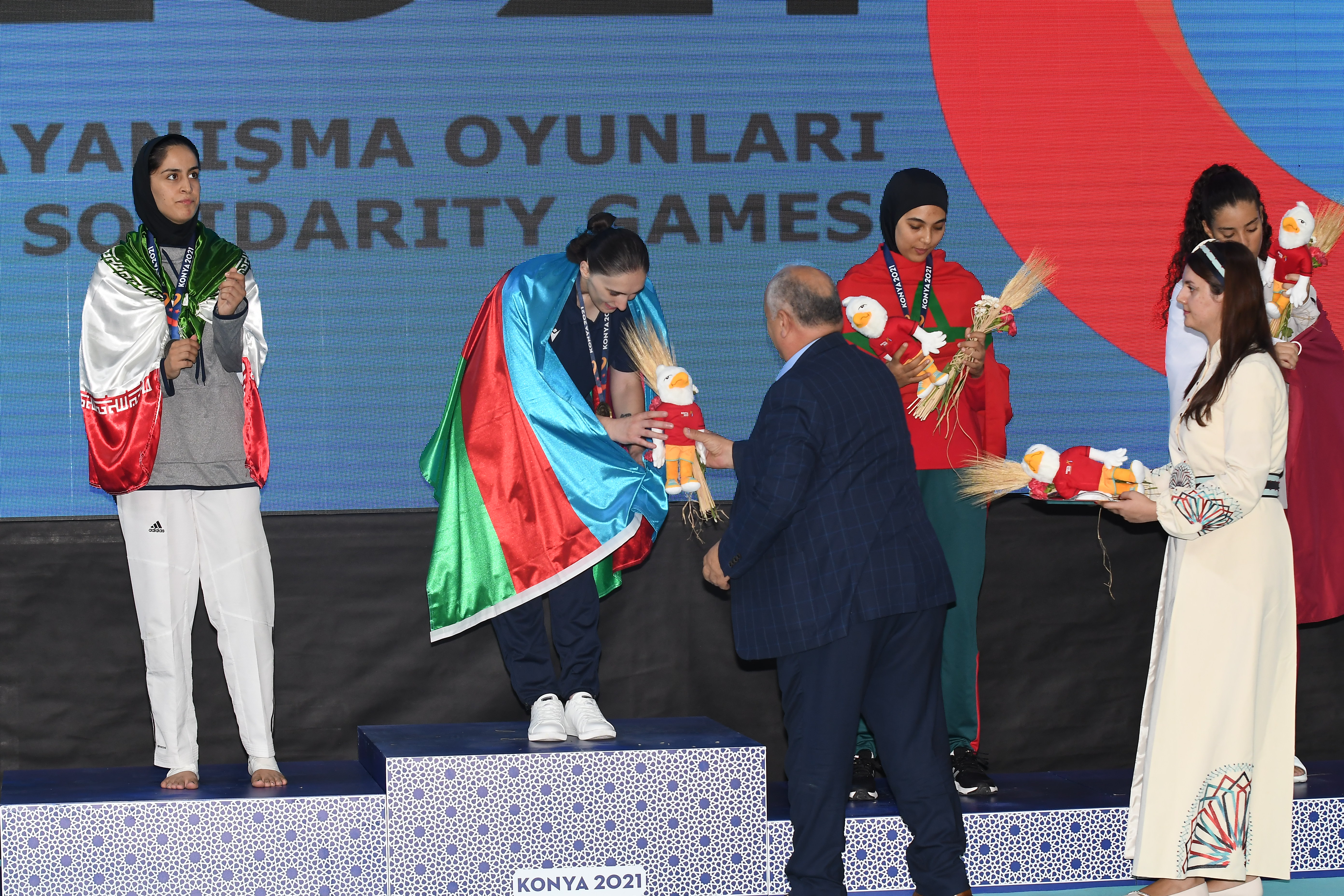
Women 67 kg Medal Ceremony

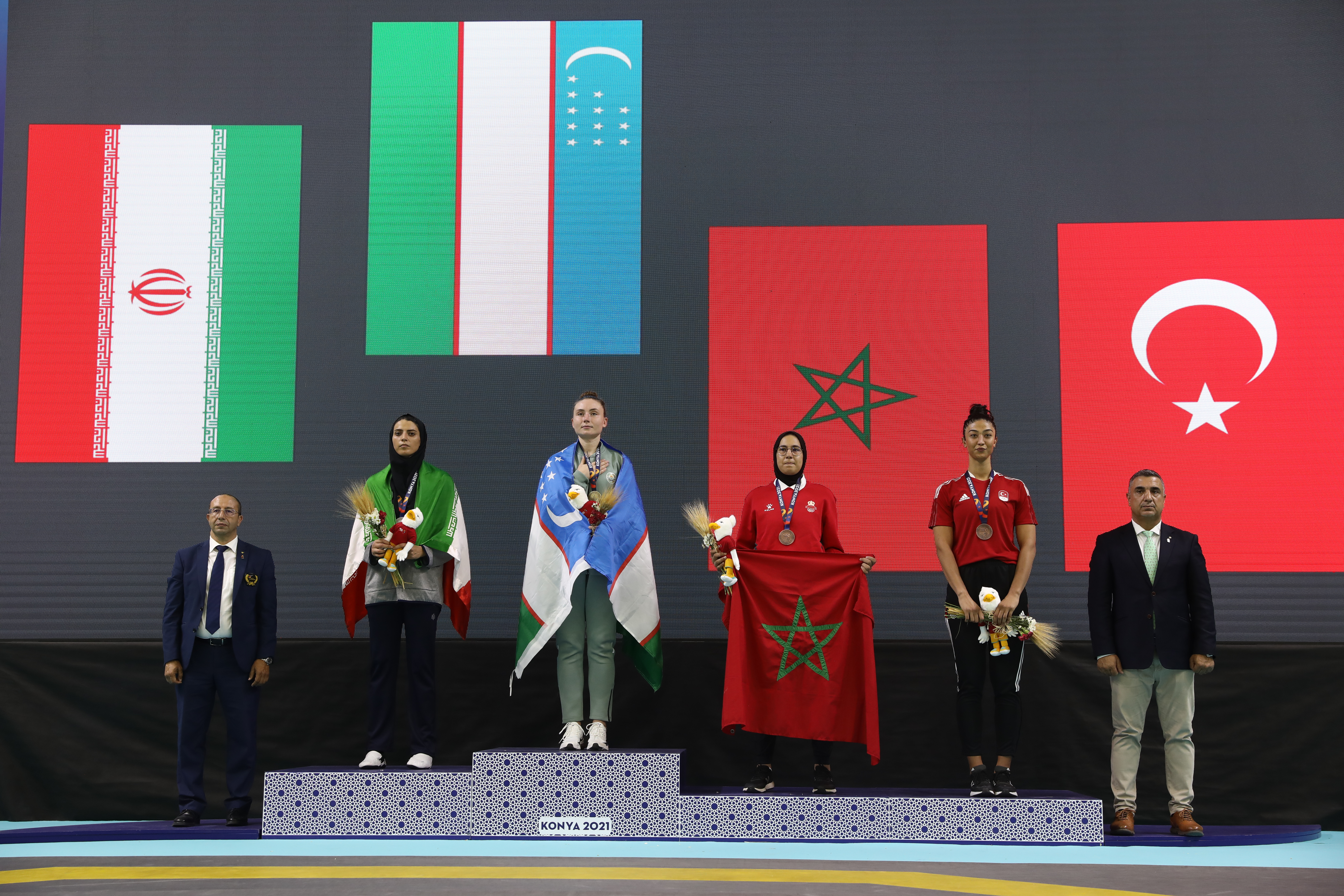
Women +73 kg Medal Ceremony

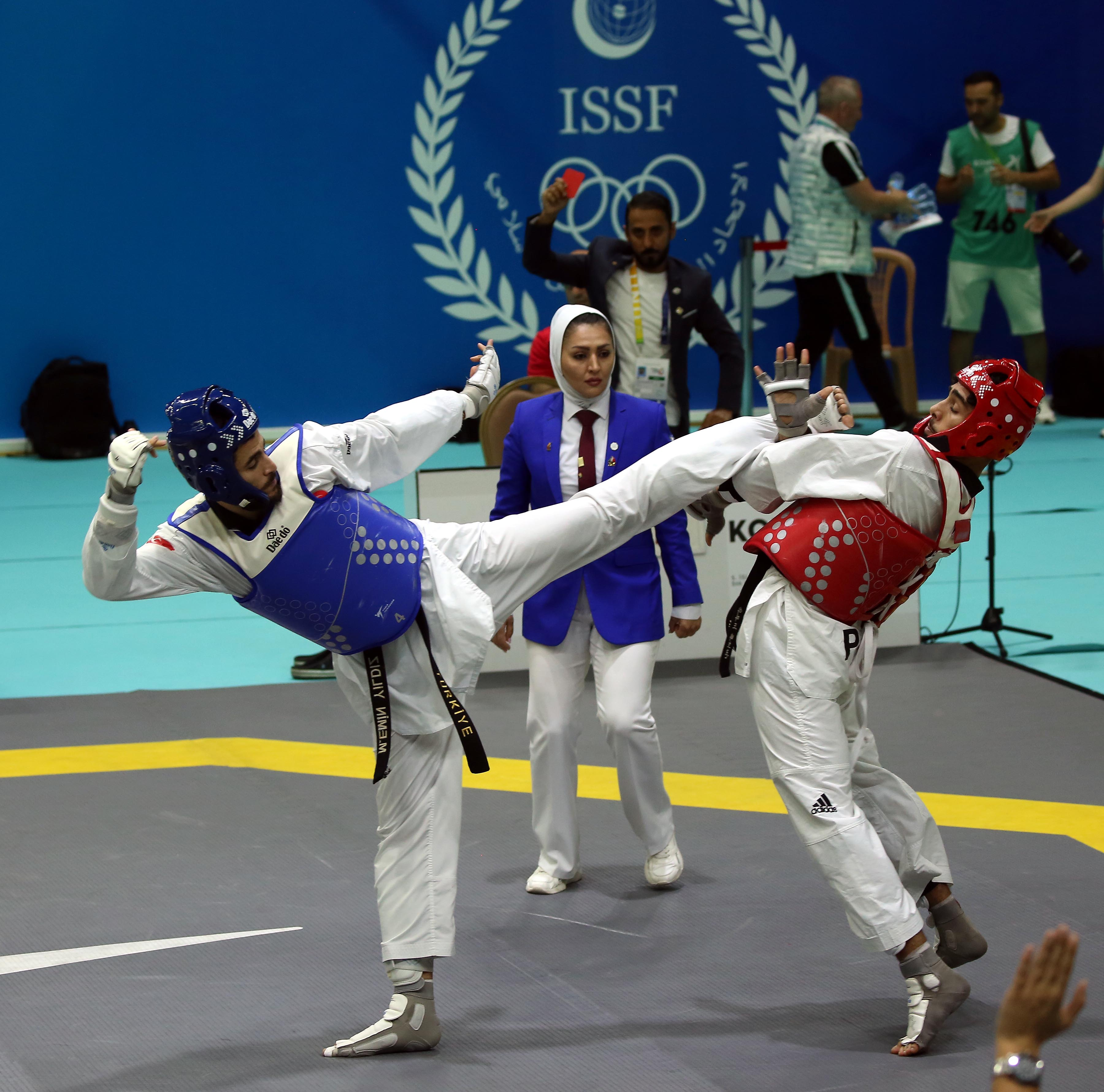
Men 74 kg Semi Final

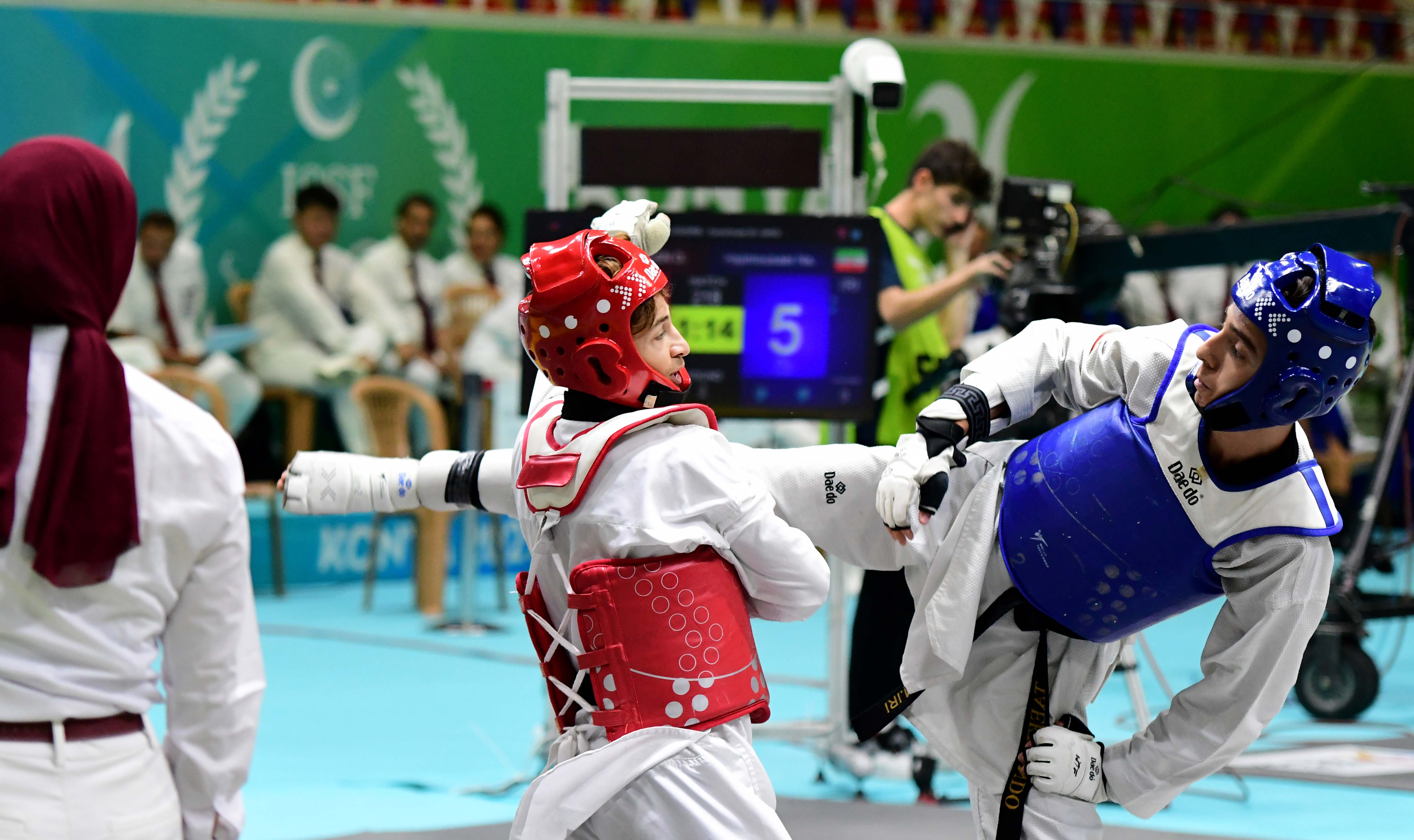
Men Taekwando

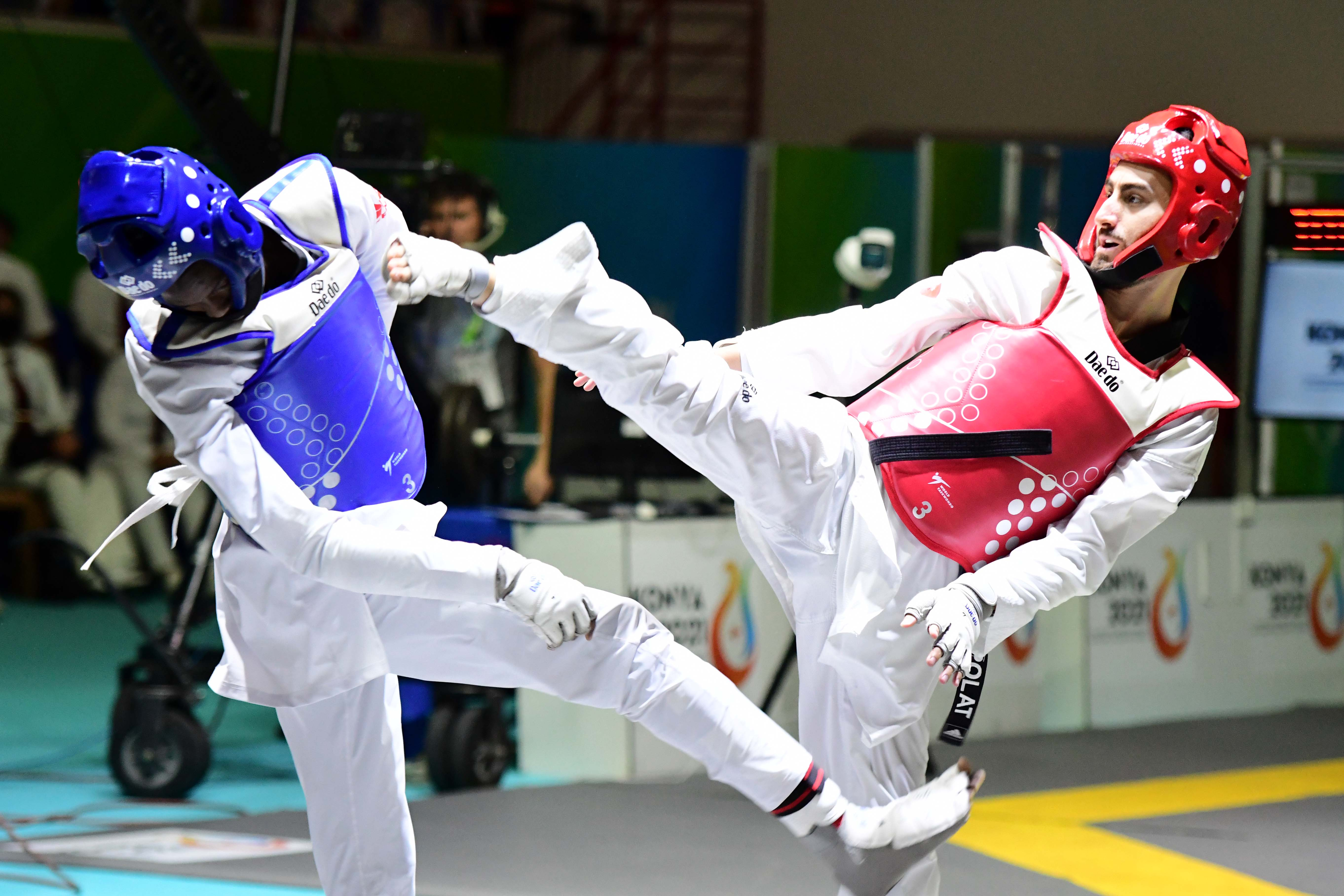
Men Taekwando

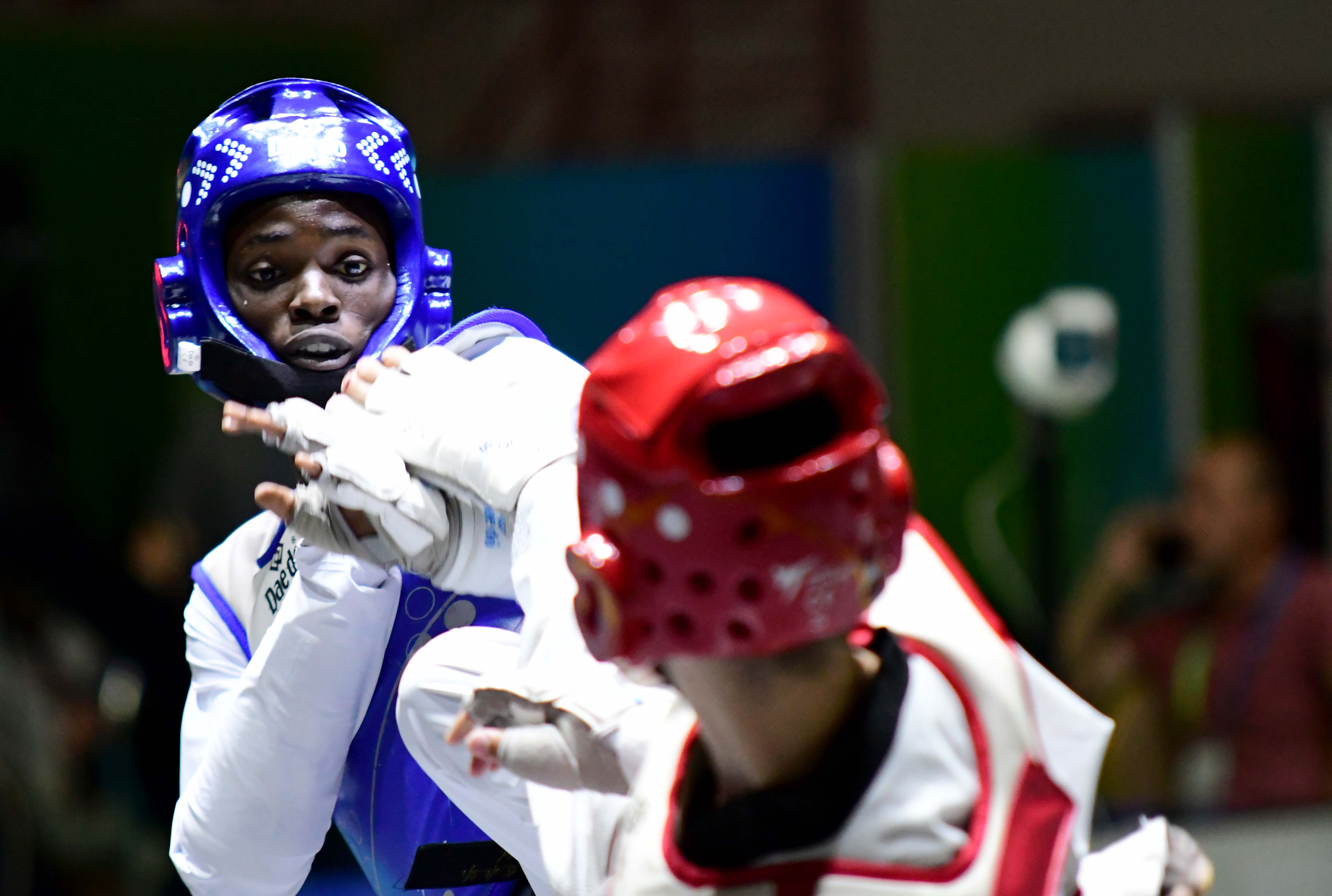
Men Taekwando

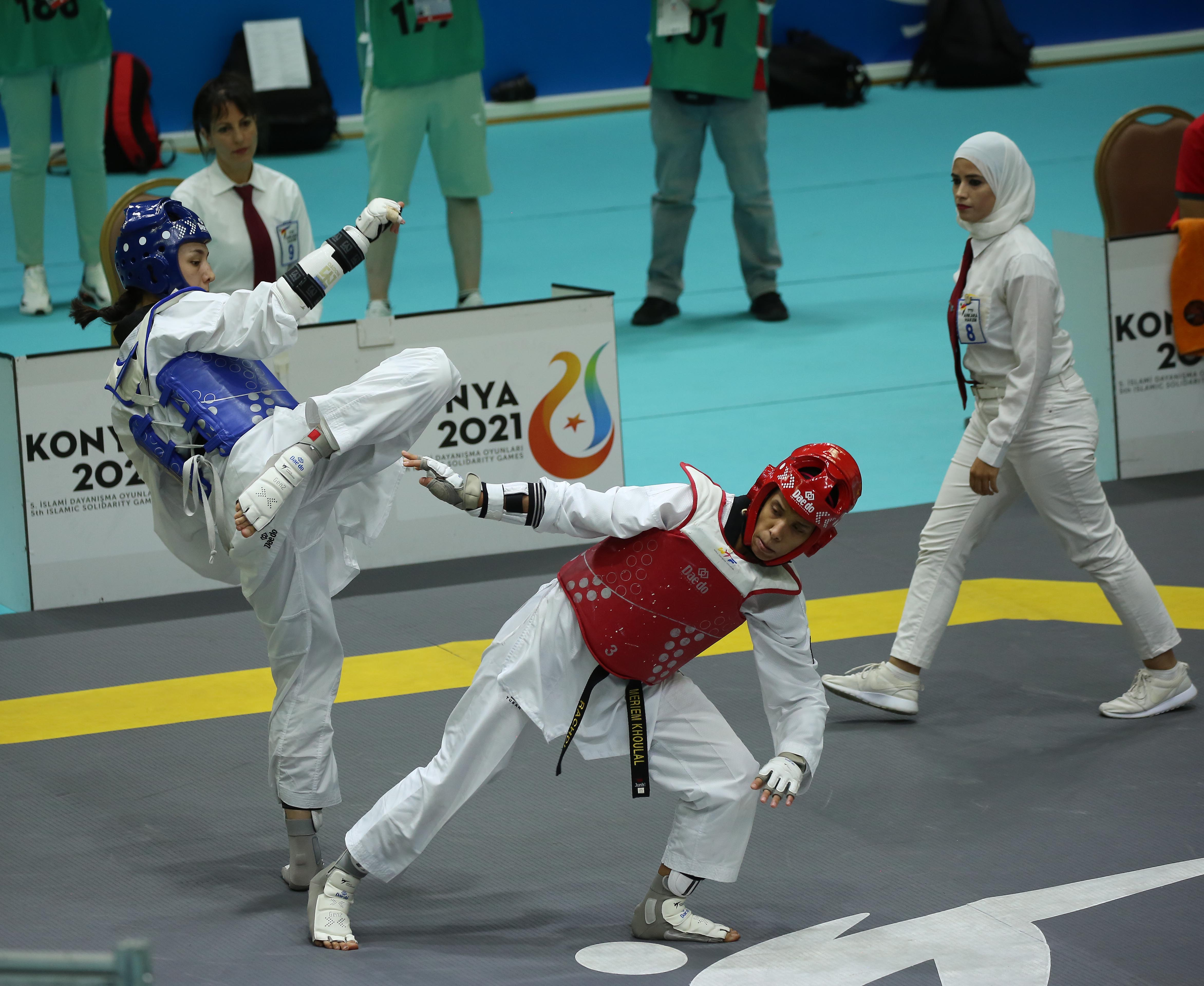
Women 62 kg Semi Final

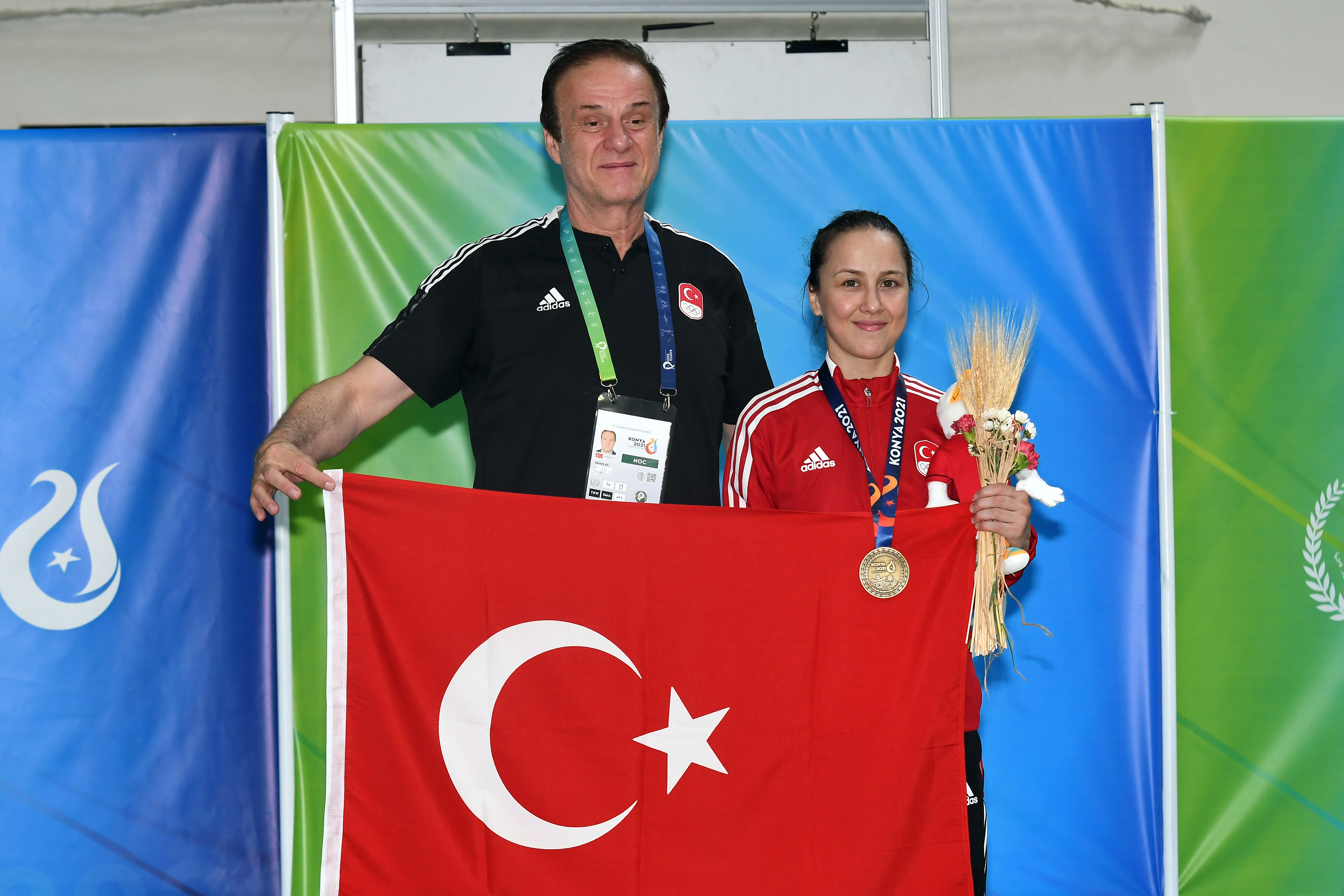
Women 49 kg Rukiye Yıldırım

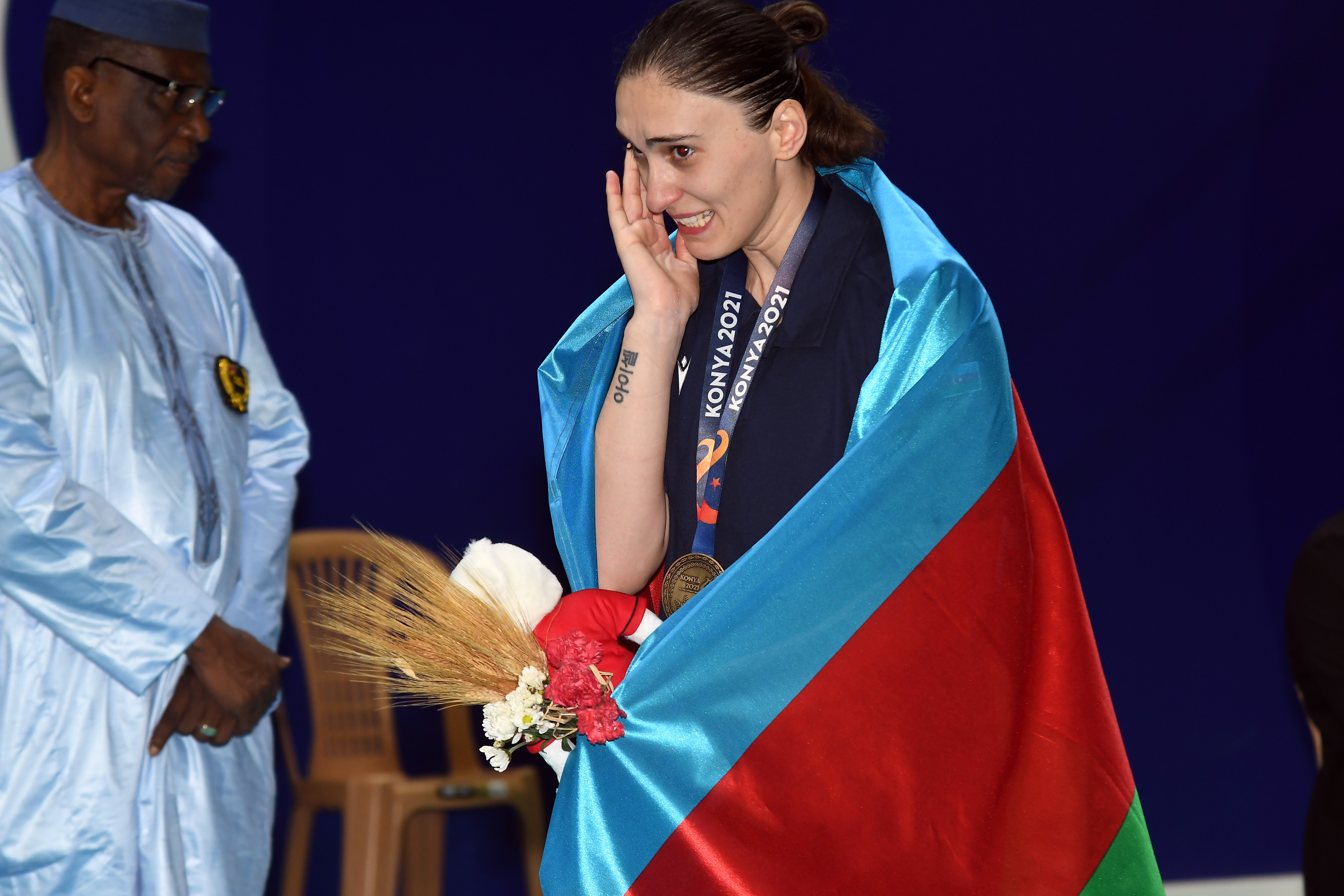
Women 67 kg Farida Azizova

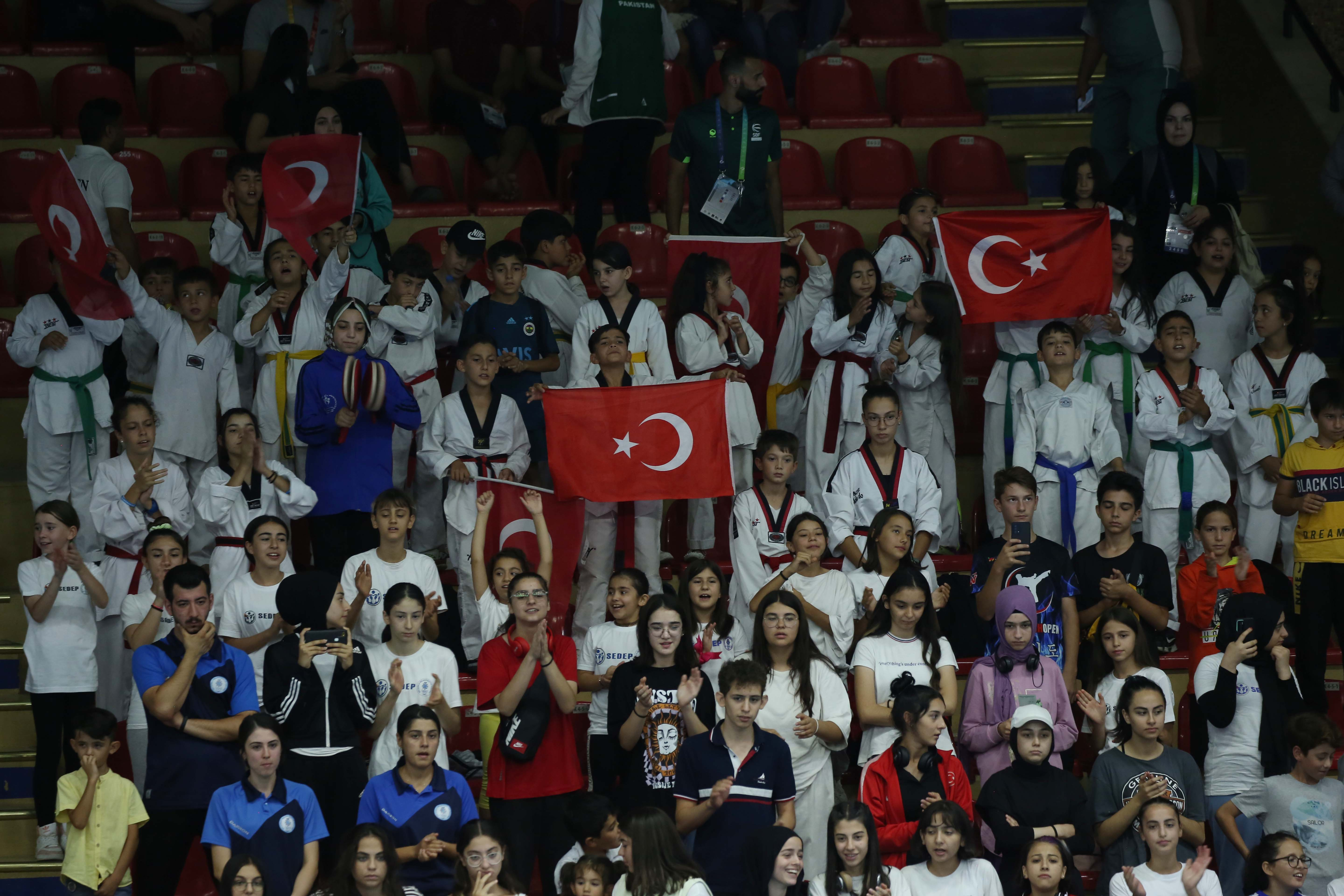
Women 62 kg Semi Final
