= Aleyna Ertürk =

Turkish fencer (born 2005)

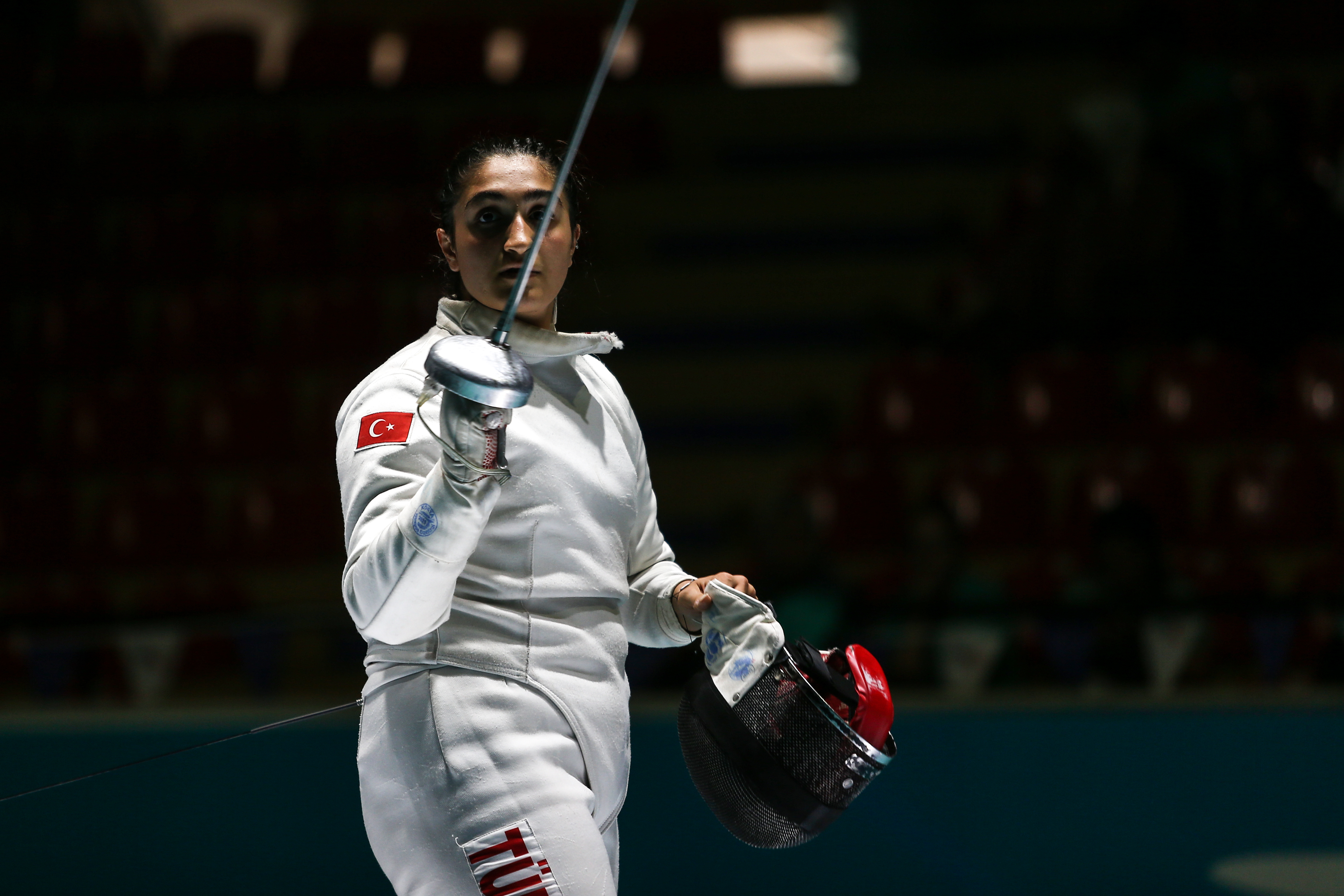
- Ertürk in 2021

Personal information
- Born: 18 August 2005 (age 21) Turkey

Sport
- Sport: Fencing
- Event: Épée
- Club: Çankaya Fencing Club
Medal record
Women's épée
Representing Turkey
Islamic Solidarity Games
Gold medal – first place	2021 Konya	Individual
Gold medal – first place	2025 Riyadh	Individual
Silver medal – second place	2025 Riyadh	Team
Mediterranean Games
Bronze medal – third place	2026 Taranto	Individual

Aleyna Ertürk (born 18 August 2005) is a Turkish fencer who competes in the épée event.

== Sport career ==
Ertürk is a member of Çankaya Fencing Club in Ankara. She has been competing at domestic tournaments of her age group since 2015, and won many medals. In 2019, she debuted internationally at the U14 European Circuit in Sofia, Bulgaria, and became champion. In 2020, she won the gold medal in the cadet category and the bronze medal in the junior category at the Mediterranean Youth Fencing Championships in Tunis, Tunisia.

=== 2022 ===
Ertürk won two medals in the épée events at the 2022 Junior and Cadet Fencing World Championships in Dubai, United Arab Emirates, a gold in the cadet category and a bronze in the junior category.

She competed at the 2022 Mediterranean Games in Oran, Algeria, and was eliminated in the round of 16.

In 2022, she won the gold medal in the individual épée event at the postponed 2021 Islamic Solidarity Games in Konya, Turkey.

=== 2023 ===
She was unable to win the first round at the 2023 World Fencing Championships in Milan, Italy.

=== 2024 ===
She took the silver medal in the team épée event at the 2024 FIE Women's Junior Épée World Cup in Tashkent, Uzbekistan. ...

=== 2025 ===
At the Bahrain Épée Men's & Women's Junior World Cup 2025 in Manama, she received two gold medals, one in the individual event, and another one in the team event.

She competed at the 2025 Solidarity Games in Riyadh, Saudi Arabia, and captured the gold medal in the individual épée event, and the silver medal in the team event.

== Personal life ==
Aleyna Ertürk was born on 18 August 2005.

She is a student of Sport coaching in the Faculty of Sports science at the Ankara Yıldırım Beyazıt University.
