= Mahsa Pourrahmati =

Iranian fencer

Personal information
- Full name: Mahsaossadat Pourrahmati Khelejan
- Born: 31 March 1992 (age 34) Tabriz, Iran
- Height: 1.72 m (5 ft 8 in)
- Weight: 67 kg (148 lb)

Fencing career
- Sport: Fencing
- Country: Iran
- Weapon: Epee
- Hand: Left-handed
- FIE ranking: current ranking
Medal record
Representing Iran
Islamic Solidarity Games
Silver medal – second place	2021 Konya	Epee

Mahsaossadat Pourrahmati Khelejan, known as Mahsa Pourrahmati (Persian: مهسا پوررحمتی; born 11 March 1992) is a member of the Iranian national fencing team in Epe weapons.

== Making history in Kuwait ==
Mahsa Pourrahmati, at the age of 21, and in her first appearance in the Asian under-23 championships, was able to win the first Iranian women's fencing medal in the individual division after the Islamic Revolution. Pourrahmati was able to win a bronze medal in the 2013 Asian Games hosted by Kuwait, in the situation where Iranian women's fencing in the individual division had not been able to win a medal in the senior category and hopes of Asia.

== Spell breaking in Thailand ==
The 2018 Asian Fencing Championship in Thailand ended while the Iranian team was able to reach the top 8 teams in the team épée section for the first time in the presence of Asian and world powers. Mahsa Pourrahmati said after the success achieved in the Asian Championship: "In the past, our best rank was the 13th or 14th Asian team, but this year, with 4 months of consecutive training, we were able to beat Australia." 2 Australian fencers were in the top 16 and their score was higher than ours, but by God's grace we eliminated this team and reached the top 8 teams in Asia. Pourrahmati has stated that her next goal is to win the Olympic quota.

== Honors ==
=== Asian Youth Championship ===
- Bronze medal of the youth team of the Asian Championship (Thailand 2011)
- Bronze medal of the youth team of the Asian Championship (Indonesia 2012)
- Individual bronze medal of the Asian Under-23 Championship (Kuwait 2013)
- Bronze medal of the youth team of the Asian Championship (Kuwait 2013)

=== Asian club competitions ===
- Individual gold medal of the Asian Club Championships (Thailand 2015)
- The team gold medal of the Asian club competition (Thailand 2015)
- Individual silver medal of the Asian club competition (Thailand 2016)
- Team bronze medal of the Asian club competition (Thailand 2016)
- Team Bronze Medal of Asian Club Championships (Malaysia 2017)

=== International competitions ===
- Individual silver medal of open international competitions (Iran 2009)
- Individual bronze medal of the international open competition (Georgia 2010)
- Individual bronze medal of the international open competition (Kazakhstan 2011)
- Bronze medal of the team of the international open competition (Kazakhstan, 2011)
- Individual silver medal of the Open International Championships (Thailand 2017)
- Team Gold Medal of Open International Competition (Thailand 2017)
- Silver medal of Islamic Solidarity Games 2021
