= Azerbaijan at the 2021 Islamic Solidarity Games =

- IOC code: AZE
- NOC: Azerbaijan Olympic Committee

in Konya, Turkey
- Competitors: 275
- Flag bearers: Ayshan Abdulazimova; Nazim Babayev
- Medals Ranked 4th: Gold 29 Silver 36 Bronze 34 Total 99

Islamic Solidarity Games appearances (overview)
- 2005; 2013; 2017; 2021; 2025

Azerbaijan participated in the 2021 Islamic Solidarity Games held in Konya, Turkey from 9 to 18 August 2022,

The games had been rescheduled several times. In May 2021, the ISSF postponed the event to August 2022 citing the COVID-19 pandemic situation in the participating countries.

== Medalists ==
Medal	Name	Sport	Event	Date
Gold	Hanna Skydan	Athletics	Women's hammer throw	8 August
Gold	Haji Aliyev	Wrestling	Men's freestyle 65 kg	10 August
Gold	Turan Bayramov	Wrestling	Men's freestyle 74 kg	10 August
Gold	Mariya Stadnik	Wrestling	Women's freestyle 50 kg	10 August
Gold	Farida Azizova	Taekwondo	Women's 67 kg	10 August
Gold	Leyla Gurbanova	Wrestling	Women's freestyle 53 kg	11 August
Gold	Ivan Tikhonov	Gymnastics	Men's vault	11 August
Gold	Eldaniz Azizli	Wrestling	Men's Greco-Roman 55 kg	12 August
Gold	Rafig Huseynov	Wrestling	Men's Greco-Roman 82 kg	12 August
Gold	Hasrat Jafarov	Wrestling	Men's Greco-Roman 67 kg	13 August
Gold	Zhala Aliyeva	Wrestling	Women's freestyle 57 kg	13 August
Gold	Azerbaijan rhythmic team	Gymnastics	Rhythmic team	13 August
Gold	Azerbaijan rhythmic team	Gymnastics	Group All-Around	13 August
Gold	Azerbaijan rhythmic team	Gymnastics	Group 3 Ribbons + 2 Balls	13 August
Gold	Zohra Aghamirova	Gymnastics	Rhythmic clubs	13 August
Gold	Zohra Aghamirova	Gymnastics	Rhythmic ribbon	13 August
Gold	Vladimir Dolmatov	Gymnastics	Men's aerobic individual	14 August
Gold	Madina Mustafayeva; Vladimir Dolmatov	Gymnastics	Aerobic mixed pairs	14 August
Gold	Azerbaijan women's national 3x3 team	3x3 basketball	Women's team	17 August
Gold	Balabay Aghayev	Judo	Men's 60 kg	15 August
Gold	Azerbaijan fencing team	Fencing	Women's sabre team	15 August
Gold	Azerbaijan fencing team	Fencing	Men's team épée	15 August
Gold	Ramil Valizada	Swimming	Men's 200 m butterfly	16 August
Gold	Azerbaijan national judo team	Judo	Men's team	17 August
Gold	Irina Zaretska	Karate	Women's 68 kg	18 August
Gold	Farid Aghamoghlanov	Kickboxing	Men's full contact 63.5 kg	18 August
Gold	Anar Mammadov	Kickboxing	Men's low kick 57 kg	18 August
Gold	Bahram Rajabzadeh	Kickboxing	Men's low kick +91 kg	18 August
Silver	Alexis Copello	Athletics	Men's triple jump	9 August
Silver	Abubakr Abakarov	Wrestling	Men's freestyle 86 kg	10 August
Silver	Alyona Kolesnik	Wrestling	Women's freestyle 59 kg	10 August
Silver	Ivan Tikhonov	Gymnastics	Men's individual all-around	10 August
Silver	Javad Aghayev	Taekwondo	Men's 68 kg	10 August
Silver	Nikita Simonov	Gymnastics	Men's rings	11 August
Silver	Gozal Zutova	Wrestling	Women's freestyle 72 kg	11 August
Silver	Islam Bazarganov	Wrestling	Men's freestyle 61 kg	11 August
Silver	Yekaterina Sariyeva	Athletics	Women's triple jump	11 August
Silver	Minaya Akbarova	Taekwondo	Women's 46 kg	11 August
Silver	Ulvu Ganizade	Wrestling	Men's Greco-Roman 72 kg	12 August
Silver	Elis Manolova	Wrestling	Women's freestyle 65 kg	12 August
Silver	Murad Mammadov	Wrestling	Men's Greco-Roman 60 kg	13 August
Silver	Sanan Suleymanov	Wrestling	Men's Greco-Roman 77 kg	13 August
Silver	Azerbaijan rhythmic team	Gymnastics	Group 5 Hoops	13 August
Silver	Zohra Aghamirova	Gymnastics	Rhythmic hoop	13 August
Silver	Azerbaijan aerobic team	Gymnastics	Aerobic team	14 August
Silver	Azerbaijan aerobic team	Gymnastics	Aerobic trio	14 August
Silver	Madina Mustafayeva	Gymnastics	Women's aerobic individual	14 August
Silver	Azerbaijan women's national handball team	Handball	Women's team	14 August
Silver	Nurlana Jafarova	Shooting	Women's skeet	15 August
Silver	Mariam Sheikhalizadeh	Swimming	Women's 50 m butterfly	14 August
Silver	Dadash Dadashbayli	Weightlifting	Men's 102 kg snatch	15 August
Silver	Rahim Nuraliyev	Judo	Men's 66 kg	16 August
Silver	Konul Aliyeva	Judo	Women's 48 kg	15 August
Silver	Ruslan Hasanov	Fencing	Men's epee individual	15 August
Silver	Palina Kaspiarovich	Fencing	Women's sabre individual	15 August
Silver	Azerbaijan men's national 3x3 team	3x3 basketball	Men's team	17 August
Silver	Elmar Gasimov	Judo	Men's 100 kg	16 August
Silver	Panah Abdullayev	Karate	Men's 84 kg	18 August
Silver	Asiman Gurbanli	Karate	Men's +84 kg	18 August
Silver	Jamal Mammadov	Kickboxing	Men's full contact 54 kg	18 August
Silver	Sagi Salehli	Kickboxing	Men's full contact 75 kg	18 August
Silver	Elvin Aghayev	Kickboxing	Men's full contact 86 kg	18 August
Silver	Rahim Aliyev	Kickboxing	Men's low kick 71 kg	18 August
Silver	Ramal Aslanov	Kickboxing	Men's low kick 75 kg	18 August
Bronze	Gashim Magomedov	Taekwondo	Men's 58 kg	9 August
Bronze	Aliabbas Rzazade	Wrestling	Men's freestyle 57 kg	10 August
Bronze	Patimat Abakarova	Taekwondo	Women's 49 kg	10 August
Bronze	Asgar Mammadaliyev	Wrestling	Men's freestyle 70 kg	11 August
Bronze	Gadzhimurad Omarov	Wrestling	Men's freestyle 79 kg	11 August
Bronze	Osman Nurmagomedov	Wrestling	Men's freestyle 92 kg	11 August
Bronze	Tetiana Omelchenko	Wrestling	Women's freestyle 62 kg	11 August
Bronze	Ivan Tikhonov	Gymnastics	Men's horizontal bar	11 August
Bronze	Nazila Ismayilova	Weightlifting	Women's 46 kg snatch	11 August
Bronze	Nazila Ismayilova	Weightlifting	Women's 46 kg Clean & Jerk	11 August
Bronze	Nazila Ismayilova	Weightlifting	Women's 46 kg total	11 August
Bronze	Elnura Mammadova	Wrestling	Women's freestyle 55 kg	12 August
Bronze	Jahan Musayev; Ali Nabiyev	Archery	Recurve bow men's team	12 August
Bronze	Azada Abdullayeva; Jahan Musayev	Archery	Recurve bow mixed team	12 August
Bronze	Sabah Shariati	Wrestling	Men's Greco-Roman 130 kg	13 August
Bronze	Azerbaijan women's national volleyball team	Volleyball	Women's team	15 August
Bronze	Zohra Aghamirova	Gymnastics	Rhythmic ball	13 August
Bronze	Jahan Musayev; Ali Nabiyev	Para archery	Recurve bow men's team	12 August
Bronze	Azada Abdullayeva; Jahan Musayev	Para archery	Recurve bow mixed team	12 August
Bronze	Telman Valiyev	Judo	Men's 73 kg	15 August
Bronze	Valeriya Bolshakova	Fencing	Women's sabre individual	15 August
Bronze	Sabina Karimova	Fencing	Women's sabre individual	15 August
Bronze	Mariam Sheikhalizadeh	Swimming	Women's 100 m butterfly	17 August
Bronze	Azerbaijan national judo team	Judo	Women's team	17 August
Bronze	Roman Heydarov	Karate	Men's kata	17 August
Bronze	Tural Aghalarzade	Karate	Men's 67 kg	18 August
Bronze	Madina Sadigova	Karate	Women's 55 kg	17 August
Bronze	Amil Mammadov	Kickboxing	Men's full contact 51 kg	18 August
Bronze	Ramiz Mammadov	Kickboxing	Men's full contact 60 kg	18 August
Bronze	Elkhan Aliyev	Kickboxing	Men's full contact 71 kg	18 August
Bronze	Arzuman Gadimov	Kickboxing	Men's low kick 63.5 kg	18 August
Bronze	Gasham Mammadov	Kickboxing	Men's low kick 67 kg	18 August
Bronze	Baybala Guliyev	Kickboxing	Men's low kick 86 kg	18 August
Bronze	Aysu Devrishova	Kickboxing	Women's low kick 56 kg	18 August

Medals by sport
Sport	1st place, gold medalist(s)	2nd place, silver medalist(s)	3rd place, bronze medalist(s)	Total
Athletics	1	2	0	3
Basketball	1	1	0	2
Fencing	2	2	2	6
Gymnastics	8	7	2	17
Handball	0	1	0	1
Judo	2	3	2	7
Karate	1	2	3	6
Kickboxing	3	5	8	16
Para archery	0	0	2	2
Shooting	1	1	0	2
Swimming	1	1	1	3
Taekwondo	1	2	2	5
Volleyball	0	0	1	1
Weightlifting	0	1	3	4
Wrestling	8	8	7	23
Total	29	36	34	99

== Basketball ==
=== Men's 3x3 tournament ===
Group C

Pos	Team	Pld	W	L	PF	PA	PD	Qualification
1	Azerbaijan	3	3	0	57	38	+19	Quarterfinals
2	Mali	3	1	2	48	46	+2	Quarterfinals
3	Turkey	3	1	2	44	53	−9	
4	Morocco	3	1	2	40	52	−12	

Source: Konya 2021
Rules for classification: 1) Wins; 2) Head-to-head record; 3) Points scored.

13 August
13:00

Report

Azerbaijan	18–15	Mali

Karatay Congress and Sport Center, Konya

13 August
16:00

Report

Azerbaijan	21–12	Turkey

Karatay Congress and Sport Center, Konya

15 August

Report

Morocco	11–18	Azerbaijan

Karatay Congress and Sport Center Konya

Quarterfinal

17 August
16:45

Report

Azerbaijan	20–18	Jordan

Karatay Congress and Sport Center, Konya

Semifinal

17 August

Report

Azerbaijan	21–17	Iran

Karatay Congress and Sport Center, Konya

Gold medal match

17 August
20:35

Report

Senegal	21–16	Azerbaijan

Karatay Congress and Sport Center, Konya

=== Women's 3x3 tournament ===
Group C

Pos	Team	Pld	W	L	PF	PA	PD	Qualification
1	Azerbaijan	2	2	0	35	16	+19	Quarterfinals
2	Turkey	2	1	1	33	17	+16	Quarterfinals
3	Kyrgyzstan	2	0	2	7	42	−35	

Source: Konya 2021
Rules for classification: 1) Wins; 2) Head-to-head record; 3) Points scored.

13 August
18:10

Report

Turkey	12–14	Azerbaijan

Karatay Congress and Sport Center Konya

13 August
14:00

Report

Kyrgyzstan	4–21	Azerbaijan

Karatay Congress and Sport Center Konya

Quarterfinal

16 August

Report

Azerbaijan	21–2	Qatar

Karatay Congress and Sport Center, Konya

Semifinal

17 August
17:45

Report

Uzbekistan	7–16	Azerbaijan

Karatay Congress and Sport Center, Konya

Gold medal match

17 August
20:10

Report

Mali	6–21	Azerbaijan

Karatay Congress and Sport Center, Konya

== Football ==
Summary

Team	Event	Group stage				Semifinal	Final / BM	
Team	Event	Opposition Score	Opposition Score	Opposition Score	Rank	Opposition Score	Opposition Score	Rank
Azerbaijan U-23 men's	Men's tournament	Saudi Arabia; L 0–1	Iran; W3–0 (w/o)	Morocco; D 2–2	2	Turkey; L 0–1	Algeria; W 0–0 (4–3)	3rd place, bronze medalist(s)

Group B

Pos	Team	Pld	W	D	L	GF	GA	GD	Pts	Qualification
1	Saudi Arabia	3	3	0	0	6	0	+6	9	Advance to knockout stage
2	Azerbaijan	3	1	1	1	5	3	+2	4	Advance to knockout stage
3	Morocco	3	1	1	1	5	4	+1	4	
4	Iran	3	0	0	3	0	9	−9	0	

8 August 2022
16:00

Saudi Arabia	1–0	Azerbaijan
Al-Ghamdi 90+6'

Konya
10 August 2022
16:00

Azerbaijan	3–0 (w/o)	Iran

Konya
12 August 2022
12:30

Azerbaijan	2–2	Morocco
Ibrahimli 6'; Abdullazade 47' (pen.)		Slim 10'; Regragui 90+3'

Konya

Semifinal

14 August 2022

Turkey	1–0	Azerbaijan
Gümüşkaya 43'

Konya

Bronze medal match

16 August 2022
14:00

Azerbaijan	0–0 (a.e.t.)	Algeria
Penalties
	4–3

Cumhuriyet Stadium, Konya

== Handball ==
=== Men's tournament ===
Group B

Pos	Team	Pld	W	D	L	GF	GA	GD	Pts	Qualification
1	Iran	2	2	0	0	68	40	+28	4	Semifinals
2	Turkey (H)	2	1	0	1	49	45	+4	2	Semifinals
3	Azerbaijan	2	0	0	2	39	71	−32	0	

Updated to match(es) played on 10 August 2022. Source:
Rules for classification: 1) Points; 2) Head-to-head points; 3) Head-to-head goal difference; 4) Head-to-head goals scored; 5) Goal difference; 6) Goals scored; 7) Draw.
(H) Hosts

10 August 2022; 15:00	Azerbaijan	19–29	Turkey	Selçuklu Municipality International Sports Hall, Selçuklu
10 August 2022; 15:00		(9–11)		Selçuklu Municipality International Sports Hall, Selçuklu

12 August 2022; 15:00	Iran	42–20	Azerbaijan	Selçuklu Municipality International Sports Hall, Selçuklu

=== Women's tournament ===
Group B

Pos	Team	Pld	W	D	L	GF	GA	GD	Pts	Qualification
1	Azerbaijan	3	3	0	0	79	26	+53	6	Semifinals
2	Cameroon	3	2	0	1	52	39	+13	4	Semifinals
3	Iran	3	1	0	2	89	74	+15	2	
4	Afghanistan	3	0	0	3	15	96	−81	0	

Updated to match(es) played on 9 August 2022. Source:
Rules for classification: 1) Points; 2) Head-to-head points; 3) Head-to-head goal difference; 4) Head-to-head goals scored; 5) Goal difference; 6) Goals scored; 7) Draw.

7 August 2022; 15:00	Cameroon	0–10	Azerbaijan	Selçuklu Municipality International Sports Hall, Selçuklu

7 August 2022; 17:00	Afghanistan	6–43	Azerbaijan	Selçuklu Municipality International Sports Hall, Selçuklu

11 August 2022; 17:00	Iran	17-26	Azerbaijan	Selçuklu Municipality International Sports Hall, Selçuklu

Semifinal

13 August 2022; 13:00	Azerbaijan	40–27	Uzbekistan	Selçuklu Municipality International Sports Hall, Selçuklu
13 August 2022; 13:00		(19–13)		Selçuklu Municipality International Sports Hall, Selçuklu

Gold medal game

14 August 2022; 15:00	Turkey	30–24	Azerbaijan	Selçuklu Municipality International Sports Hall, Selçuklu
14 August 2022; 15:00		(14–10)		Selçuklu Municipality International Sports Hall, Selçuklu

== Judo ==
Men

Athlete	Event	Round of 32	Round of 16	Quarterfinals	Semifinals	Repechage	Final / BM	
Athlete	Event	Opposition Result	Opposition Result	Opposition Result	Opposition Result	Opposition Result	Opposition Result	Rank
Balabay Agayev	60 kg	—N/a	Bye	Seilkhan (KAZ); W	Jumaýew (TKM); W	—N/a	Nurillaev (UZB); W	1st place, gold medalist(s)
Ibrahim Aliyev	66 kg	Bye	Ystybay (KAZ); L	did not advance				
Nariman Mirzayev	73 kg	Bye	Sarakhonov (TJK); W	Naqbi (UAE); W	Sagynaliev (KGZ); W	—N/a	Akhadov (UZB); L	2nd place, silver medalist(s)
Telman Valiyev	73 kg	Bye	Sedighi (IRI); W	Akhadov (UZB); L	—N/a	Zourdani (ALG); W	Sagynaliev (KGZ); W	3rd place, bronze medalist(s)
Zalim Tchgayev	81 kg	Bye	Boubou (MTN); W	Masabirov (KGZ); W	Albayrak (TUR); L	—N/a	Boltaboev (UZB); L	5
Elmar Gasimov	−100 kg	—N/a	Bye	Khan (PAK); W	Şişmanlar (TUR); W	—N/a	Turoboyev (UZB); L	2nd place, silver medalist(s)
Imran Yusifov	+100 kg	—N/a	Malekzadeh (IRI); W	Yusupov (UZB); L	—N/a	Belrekaa (ALG); W	Ndiaye (SEN); L	5

Women

Athlete	Event	Round of 16	Quarterfinals	Semifinals	Repechage	Final / BM	
Athlete	Event	Opposition Result	Opposition Result	Opposition Result	Opposition Result	Opposition Result	Rank
Konul Aliyeva	48 kg	Hojageldiyeva (TKM); W	Bedioui (TUN); W	Chakir (MAR); W	—N/a	Beder (TUR); L	2nd place, silver medalist(s)
Leyla Aliyeva	48 kg	—N/a	Jahangiri (IRI); W	Beder (TUR); L	—N/a	Bedioui (TUN); L	5
Gultaj Mammadaliyeva	52 kg	Koçyiğit (TUR); L	did not advance				
Sabina Aliyeva	57 kg	Chegenisharafi (IRI); L	did not advance				
Nargiz Hajizade	63 kg	Isaeva (KGZ); L	did not advance				
Gunel Hasanli	70 kg	Altahhan (PLE); W	Matniyazova (UZB); L	—N/a	Biami (CMR); W	Akdeniz (TUR); L	5
Südabə Ağayeva	70 kg	Odinaeva (TJK); W	Landolsi (TUN); L	—N/a	Nazarova (UZB); L	—N/a	7

== Volleyball ==
=== Men's tournament ===
Pool A

Pos	Team	Pld	W	L	Pts	SW	SL	SR	SPW	SPL	SPR	Qualification
1	Cameroon	3	2	1	7	8	3	2.667	255	220	1.159	Semifinals
2	Azerbaijan	3	2	1	6	6	4	1.500	232	220	1.055	Semifinals
3	Morocco	3	2	1	5	7	5	1.400	272	246	1.106	
4	Sudan	3	0	3	0	0	9	0.000	152	225	0.676	

Source: TVF

Date	Time		Score		Set 1	Set 2	Set 3	Set 4	Set 5	Total	Report
9 Aug	10:00	Sudan	0–3	Azerbaijan	13–25	20–25	22–25			55–75	Report
11 Aug	19:00	Azerbaijan	0–3	Cameroon	19–25	23–25	15–25			57–75	Report
13 Aug	16:00	Azerbaijan	3–1	Morocco	25–20	22–25	28–26	25–19		100–90	Report

Semifinal

Date	Time		Score		Set 1	Set 2	Set 3	Set 4	Set 5	Total	Report
14 Aug	13:00	Iran	3–0	Azerbaijan	25–17	25–20	25–11			75–48	Report

Bronze medal match

Date	Time		Score		Set 1	Set 2	Set 3	Set 4	Set 5	Total	Report
15 Aug	10:00	Turkey	3–1	Azerbaijan	26–24	22–25	28–26	25–14		101–89	Report

=== Women's tournament ===
Pool B

Pos	Team	Pld	W	L	Pts	SW	SL	SR	SPW	SPL	SPR	Qualification
1	Azerbaijan	3	3	0	9	9	1	9.000	257	119	2.160	Semifinals
2	Cameroon	3	2	1	6	7	3	2.333	227	189	1.201	Semifinals
3	Senegal	3	1	2	3	3	6	0.500	142	189	0.751	
4	Afghanistan	3	0	3	0	0	9	0.000	96	225	0.427	

Source: TVF

Date	Time		Score		Set 1	Set 2	Set 3	Set 4	Set 5	Total	Report
8 Aug	16:00	Azerbaijan	3–0	Senegal	25–7	25–6	25–10			75–23	Report
10 Aug	13:00	Afghanistan	0–3	Azerbaijan	4–25	11–25	4–25			19–75	Report
12 Aug	13:00	Cameroon	1–3	Azerbaijan	31–29	12–25	8–25	26–28		77–107	Report

Semifinal

Date	Time		Score		Set 1	Set 2	Set 3	Set 4	Set 5	Total	Report
14 Aug	10:00	Azerbaijan	1–3	Iran	18–25	25–18	16–25	22–25		81–93	Report

Bronze medal match

Date	Time		Score		Set 1	Set 2	Set 3	Set 4	Set 5	Total	Report
15 Aug	13:00	Cameroon	0–3	Azerbaijan	25–27	13–25	17–25			55–77	Report

== Weightlifting ==
Results

Athlete	Event	Snatch		Clean & Jerk		Total	Result
Athlete	Event	Result	Rank	Result	Rank	Total	Result
Tehran Mammadov	Men's -61kg	116	6	141	8	257	6
Pasha Ibrahimli	Men's -73kg	128	4	159	4	287	4
Fugan Aliyev	Men's -81kg	135	11	171	8	306	10
Kamran Ismayilov	Men's -89kg	170	8	141	10	311	8
Dadash Dadashbayli	Men's -102kg	174	2nd place, silver medalist(s)	210	5	384	4
Ali Shukurlu	Men's -109kg	160	5	183	5	343	5
Nazila Ismayilova	Women's -45kg	54	3rd place, bronze medalist(s)	67	3rd place, bronze medalist(s)	121	3rd place, bronze medalist(s)
Elnura Abbasova	Women's -71kg	80	5	101	5	181	5
Moum Anastassiya	Women's -76kg	88	6	111	6	199	6

== Wrestling ==
Men's freestyle

Athlete	Event	Round of 16	Quarterfinal	Semifinal	Repesaj	Final / BM	
Athlete	Event	Opposition Result	Opposition Result	Opposition Result	Opposition Result	Opposition Result	Rank
Aliabbas Rzazade	57 kg	Smanbekov (KGZ); L 4-13	—N/a		Omar (SEN); W 4-2	Hikmatullo (TJK); W 8-8	3rd place, bronze medalist(s)
Islam Bazarganov	61 kg	Naseri (AFG); W 10-0	Bilal (PAK); W 3-0	Dastan (IRI); W 10-0	—N/a	Turobov (UZB); L 6-6	2nd place, silver medalist(s)
Haji Aliyev	65 kg	Bye	Ghiasi (IRI); W 8-4	Jalolov (UZB); W 4-0	—N/a	Abakarov (ALB); W 4-0	1st place, gold medalist(s)
Asgar Mammadaliyev	70 kg	Christian (CMR); W 10-0	Dudaev (ALB); W 5-4	Christian (KGZ); L 1-12	—N/a	Sharifov (TJK); W 3-0	3rd place, bronze medalist(s)
Turan Bayramov	74 kg	Bye	Navruzov (UZB); W 8-0	Abdelkader (ALG); W 11-0	—N/a	Firouzpour (IRI); W 2-1	1st place, gold medalist(s)
Gadzhimurad Omarov	79 kg	Bye	Budazhapov (KGZ); W 4-4	Savadkouhi (IRI); L 0-7	—N/a	Koshkinbayev (KAZ); W 10-4	3rd place, bronze medalist(s)
Abubakr Abakarov	86 kg	Bye	Fayzullaev (UZB); W 11-0	Göçen (TUR); W 7-6	—N/a	Karimi (IRI); L 0-9	2nd place, silver medalist(s)
Osman Nurmagomedov	92 kg	Bye	Kaddidi (TUN); W 10-0	Bazri (IRI); L 6-6	—N/a	Kaddidi (TUN); W 10-0	3rd place, bronze medalist(s)
Islam Ilyasov	97 kg	Bye	Ibragimov (KAZ); L	did not advanced			7

Athlete	Event	Round Robin				Semifinal	Final / BM	
Athlete	Event	Opposition Result	Opposition Result	Opposition Result	Rank	Opposition Result	Opposition Result	Rank
Rahid Hamidli	125 kg	Hashemi (IRI); L 0-9	Rakhimov (UZB); L 0-6	Turdubekov (KGZ); W 3-1	3	did not advanced		5

Men's Greco-Roman

Athlete	Event	Round of 16	Quarterfinal	Semifinal	Repesaj	Final / BM	
Athlete	Event	Opposition Result	Opposition Result	Opposition Result	Opposition Result	Opposition Result	Rank
Eldaniz Azizli	55 kg	—N/a	Durdyýew (TKM); W 8-0	Bekbolatov (KAZ); W 3-1	—N/a	Ortikboev (UZB); W 10-1	1st place, gold medalist(s)
Murad Mammadov	60 kg	Bye	Fidakhmetov (UZB); W 4-1	Karakuş (TUR); W 10-7	—N/a	Sharshenbekov (KGZ); L 2-10	2nd place, silver medalist(s)
Taleh Mammadov	63 kg	Alsubaie (KSA); W 11-0	Tirkashev (UZB); L 0-11	did not advanced			7
Hasrat Jafarov	67 kg	Bye	Rezaei (IRI); W 10-3	Nobatow (TKM); W 9-1	—N/a	Ismailov (KGZ); W 3-1	1st place, gold medalist(s)
Ulvu Ganizade	72 kg	—N/a	Dağ (TUR); W 10-1	Konurbaev (KGZ); W 9-0		Rostami (IRI); L 8-9	2nd place, silver medalist(s)
Sanan Suleymanov	77 kg	—N/a	Kavianinejad (IRI); W 4-0	Maafi (TUN); W 4-3		Makhmudov (KGZ); L 2-5	2nd place, silver medalist(s)
Rafig Huseynov	82 kg	Nabizada (AFG); W 8-0	Orazow (TKM); W 9-0	Kuş (TUR); W 2-1		Asykeev (KGZ); W 6-3	1st place, gold medalist(s)
Arif Niftullayev	97 kg	—N/a	Bali (IRI); L 0-10	did not advanced			7

Athlete	Event	Round Robin				Semifinal	Final / BM	
Athlete	Event	Opposition Result	Opposition Result	Opposition Result	Rank	Opposition Result	Opposition Result	Rank
Mahammad Ahmadiyev	87 kg	Khasanov (TJK); W 8-0	Azisbek (KGZ); L 3-3	—N/a	2 Q	Berdimuratov (UZB); L 0-8	Azisbek (KGZ); L 2-3	4
Sabah Shariati	130 kg	Abdullaev (UZB); W 4-1	Savenko (KAZ); W 5-1	—N/a	1 Q	Yıldırım (TUR); L 1-3	Savenko (KAZ); W 5-0	3rd place, bronze medalist(s)

Women's freestyle

Athlete	Event	Round of 16	Quarterfinal	Semifinal	Repesaj	Final / BM	
Athlete	Event	Opposition Result	Opposition Result	Opposition Result	Opposition Result	Opposition Result	Rank
Leyla Gurbanova	53 kg	—N/a	Marimar (INA); W 6-2	Arı (TUR); W 10-0	—N/a	Keunimjaeva (UZB); W 6-1	1st place, gold medalist(s)
Tetiana Omelchenko	62 kg	—N/a	Esenbaeva (UZB); W 12-2	Camara (GUI); L 1-4	—N/a	Herlina (INA); W 11-0	3rd place, bronze medalist(s)
Gozal Zutova	72 kg	Bye	Jeljeli (TUN); W 16-5	Ngiri (CMR); W 6-0	—N/a	Tosun (TUR); L 0-5	2nd place, silver medalist(s)

Nordic Format

Athlete	Event	Nordic Round Robin				Rank
Athlete	Event	Opposition Result	Opposition Result	Opposition Result	Opposition Result	Rank
Elnura Mammadova	55 kg	—N/a	Yetgil (TUR); L 2–3	Akhmedova (UZB); L 5-6	Hammami (TUN); W 11–0	3rd place, bronze medalist(s)
Alyona Kolesnik	59 kg	Adekuoroye (NGR); L 1–3	Bekesh (KAZ); W 12–0	Çelik (TUR); W 4–2	Aimbetova (UZB); W 10–3	2nd place, silver medalist(s)

Group Stage Format

Athlete	Event	Group Stage			Semifinal	Final / BM	
Athlete	Event	Opposition Result	Opposition Result	Rank	Opposition Result	Opposition Result	Rank
Mariya Stadnik	50 kg	Ankicheva (KAZ); W 10–0	Çataloğlu (TUR); W 10–0	1 Q	Hamdi (TUN); W 10–0	Immaeva (UZB); W 10–0	1st place, gold medalist(s)
Zhala Aliyeva	57 kg	Sobirova (UZB); W 4–2	Almaganbetova (KAZ); W 9–2	1 Q	Kamaloğlu (TUR); W 9–6	Kolawole (NGR); W 14–6	1st place, gold medalist(s)
Elis Manolova	65 kg	Shalygina (KAZ); W 5–4	Jumabaeva (UZB); W 5–0	1 Q	Ngolle (CMR); W 2–1	Shalygina (KAZ); L 3–3	2nd place, silver medalist(s)
