= Senegal at the 2021 Islamic Solidarity Games =

- IOC code: SEN
- NOC: Senegalese National Olympic and Sports Committee

in Konya, Turkey
- Competitors: 128
- Medals: Gold 1 Silver 1 Bronze 5 Total 7

Islamic Solidarity Games appearances
- 2005; 2013; 2017; 2021; 2025

Senegal participated in the 2021 Islamic Solidarity Games held in Konya, Turkey from 9 to 18 August 2022.

The games had been rescheduled several times. In May 2021, the ISSF postponed the event to August 2022 citing the COVID-19 pandemic situation in the participating countries.

== Medalists ==
Medal	Name	Sport	Event	Date

Medals by sport
Sport	1st place, gold medalist(s)	2nd place, silver medalist(s)	3rd place, bronze medalist(s)	Total
Athletics	0	1	1	2
Basketball	1	0	0	1
Judo	0	0	2	2
Para athletics	0	0	1	1
Taekwondo	0	0	1	1
Total	1	1	5	7

== Basketball ==
=== Men's 3x3 tournament ===
Group A

Pos	Team	Pld	W	L	PF	PA	PD	Qualification
1	Senegal	3	3	0	51	34	+17	Quarterfinals
2	Jordan	3	1	2	46	47	−1	Quarterfinals
3	Qatar	3	1	2	45	46	−1	
4	Palestine	3	1	2	41	56	−15	

Source: Konya 2021
Rules for classification: 1) Wins; 2) Head-to-head record; 3) Points scored.

13 August
14:00

Report

Jordan	10–18	Senegal

Karatay Congress and Sport Center, Konya

13 August

Report

Senegal	21–13	Palestine

Karatay Congress and Sport Center, Konya

15 August

Report

Qatar	11–12	Senegal

Karatay Congress and Sport Center Konya

Quarterfinal

17 August
15:30

Report

Senegal	13–7	Mali

Karatay Congress and Sport Center, Konya

Semifinal

17 August

Report

Senegal	21–18	Suriname

Karatay Congress and Sport Center, Konya

Gold medal match

17 August
20:35

Report

Senegal	21–16	Azerbaijan

Karatay Congress and Sport Center, Konya

=== Women's 3x3 tournament ===
Group D

Pos	Team	Pld	W	L	PF	PA	PD	Qualification
1	Senegal	3	3	0	56	29	+27	Quarterfinals
2	Iran	3	1	2	54	42	+12	Quarterfinals
3	Turkmenistan	3	1	2	42	53	−11	
4	Gambia	3	1	2	25	53	−28	

Source: Konya 2021
Rules for classification: 1) Wins; 2) Head-to-head record; 3) Points scored.

13 August
13:00

Report

Iran	13–15	Senegal

Karatay Congress and Sport Center Konya

13 August
13:00

Report

Gambia	6–21	Senegal

Karatay Congress and Sport Center, Konya

15 August

Report

Senegal	20–10	Turkmenistan

Karatay Congress and Sport Center, Konya

Quarterfinal

16 August

Report

Senegal	13–17	Mali

Karatay Congress and Sport Center, Konya

== Football ==
Summary

Team	Event	Group stage				Semifinal	Final / BM	
Team	Event	Opposition Score	Opposition Score	Opposition Score	Rank	Opposition Score	Opposition Score	Rank
Senegal U-23 men's	Men's tournament	Turkey; L 0–1	Algeria; D 1–1	Cameroon; W 2–0	3	did not advance		6

Group A

Pos	Team	Pld	W	D	L	GF	GA	GD	Pts	Qualification
1	Turkey (H)	3	2	1	0	5	3	+2	7	Advance to knockout stage
2	Algeria	3	1	2	0	5	2	+3	5	Advance to knockout stage
3	Senegal	3	1	1	1	3	2	+1	4	
4	Cameroon	3	0	0	3	2	8	−6	0	

(H) Hosts
8 August 2022
16:00

Turkey	1–0	Senegal
Gümüşkaya 27'

Konya
10 August 2022
16:00

Senegal	1–1	Algeria
Sambou 63'		Bekkouche 84' (pen.)

Konya
12 August 2022
12:30

Cameroon	0–2	Senegal
		Diagn 32', 65'

Konya

== Handball ==
=== Women's tournament ===
Group A

Pos	Team	Pld	W	D	L	GF	GA	GD	Pts	Qualification
1	Turkey (H)	3	3	0	0	127	62	+65	6	Semifinals
2	Uzbekistan	3	2	0	1	99	89	+10	4	Semifinals
3	Senegal	3	1	0	2	95	87	+8	2	Fifth place game
4	Bangladesh	3	0	0	3	55	138	−83	0	Seventh place game

Rules for classification: 1) Points; 2) Head-to-head points; 3) Head-to-head goal difference; 4) Head-to-head goals scored; 5) Goal difference; 6) Goals scored; 7) Draw.
(H) Hosts

7 August 2022; 11:00	Senegal	27–28	Uzbekistan	Selçuklu Municipality International Sports Hall, Selçuklu

7 August 2022; 11:00	Senegal	27–28	Uzbekistan	Selçuklu Municipality International Sports Hall, Selçuklu

9 August 2022; 11:00	Senegal	23–34	Turkey	Selçuklu Municipality International Sports Hall, Selçuklu
9 August 2022; 11:00		(14–16)		Selçuklu Municipality International Sports Hall, Selçuklu

11 August 2022; 11:00	Senegal	45–25	Bangladesh	Selçuklu Municipality International Sports Hall, Selçuklu

Fifth place game

12 August 2022	Senegal	25–24	Iran	Selçuklu Municipality International Sports Hall, Selçuklu

== Volleyball ==
Pool B

Prelimanary round

Pos	Team	Pld	W	L	Pts	SW	SL	SR	SPW	SPL	SPR	Qualification
1	Azerbaijan	3	3	0	9	9	1	9.000	257	119	2.160	Semifinals
2	Cameroon	3	2	1	6	7	3	2.333	227	189	1.201	Semifinals
3	Senegal	3	1	2	3	3	6	0.500	142	189	0.751	
4	Afghanistan	3	0	3	0	0	9	0.000	96	225	0.427	

Source: TVF

Date	Time		Score		Set 1	Set 2	Set 3	Set 4	Set 5	Total	Report
8 August	16:00	Azerbaijan	3–0	Senegal	25–7	25–6	25–10			75–23	
10 August	19:00	Senegal	0–3	Cameroon	16–25	17–25	11–25			44–75	
12 August	16:00	Afghanistan	0–3	Senegal	22–25	8–25	9–25			39–75	
