= 3x3 basketball at the 2021 Islamic Solidarity Games =

3x3 basketball competition

- Venue: Karatay Congress and Sport Center
- Dates: 13–17 August 2022

The 3x3 basketball competition at the 2021 Islamic Solidarity Games was held in Konya, Turkey from 13 to 17 August 2022 in Karatay Congress and Sport Center.

The Games were originally scheduled to take place from 20 to 29 August 2021. In May 2020, the Islamic Solidarity Sports Federation (ISSF), who are responsible for the direction and control of the Islamic Solidarity Games, postponed the games as the 2020 Summer Olympics were postponed to July and August 2021, due to the global COVID-19 pandemic.

== Medalists ==
Event	Gold	Silver	Bronze
Men	Senegal; Bara Diop; Mohamed Doumbya; Samba Dali Fall; Momath Seck	Azerbaijan; Orhan Aydın; Amil Hamzayev; Zaur Pashayev; Endar Poladkhanli	Iran; Ehsan Dalirzahan; Sina Vahedi; Amir Hossein Rezaeifar; Matin Aghajanpour
Women	Azerbaijan; Tatyana Deniskina; Tiffany Hayes; Alexandra Mollenhauer; Dina Ulyanova	Mali; Alima Dembélé; Awa Kamissoko; Assetou Sissoko; Assetou Traoré	Turkey; Nihan Demirkol Tolğay; Gökşen Fitik; Damla Gezgin; Derin Yaya

== Medal table ==
Rank	Nation	Gold	Silver	Bronze	Total
1	Azerbaijan (AZE)	1	1	0	2
2	Senegal (SEN)	1	0	0	1
3	Mali (MLI)	0	1	0	1
4	Iran (IRI)	0	0	1	1
4	Turkey (TUR)	0	0	1	1
Totals (5 entries)		2	2	2	6

== Men ==
=== Preliminary round ===
==== Group A ====
Pos	Team	Pld	W	L	PF	PA	PD
1	Senegal	3	3	0	51	34	+17
2	Jordan	3	1	2	46	47	−1
3	Qatar	3	1	2	45	46	−1
4	Palestine	3	1	2	41	56	−15

Source: FIBA

13 August
15:30

Qatar	21–12	Palestine

Karatay Congress and Sport Center, Konya

13 August
15:55

Senegal	18–10	Jordan

Karatay Congress and Sport Center, Konya

13 August
19:10

Senegal	21–13	Palestine

Karatay Congress and Sport Center, Konya

13 August
19:35

Jordan	22–13	Qatar

Karatay Congress and Sport Center, Konya

15 August
16:20

Qatar	11–12	Senegal

Karatay Congress and Sport Center, Konya

15 August
16:45

Palestine	16–14	Jordan

Karatay Congress and Sport Center, Konya

==== Group B ====
Pos	Team	Pld	W	L	PF	PA	PD
1	Iran	4	4	0	84	41	+43
2	Uganda	4	3	1	67	56	+11
3	Guyana	4	2	2	67	68	−1
4	Mauritania	4	1	3	64	65	−1
5	Maldives	4	0	4	32	84	−52

Source: FIBA

14 August
10:00

Mauritania	13–21	Iran

Karatay Congress and Sport Center, Konya

14 August
10:50

Uganda	20–7	Maldives

Karatay Congress and Sport Center, Konya

14 August
11:15

Mauritania	17–18	Guyana

Karatay Congress and Sport Center, Konya

14 August
12:15

Iran	21–4	Maldives

Karatay Congress and Sport Center, Konya

14 August
12:40

Guyana	15–18	Uganda

Karatay Congress and Sport Center, Konya

16 August
15:05

Maldives	9–21	Mauritania

Karatay Congress and Sport Center, Konya

16 August
15:30

Iran	21–12	Uganda

Karatay Congress and Sport Center, Konya

16 August
17:45

Guyana	12–21	Iran

Karatay Congress and Sport Center, Konya

16 August
18:10

Uganda	17–13	Mauritania

Karatay Congress and Sport Center, Konya

16 August
20:25

Maldives	12–22	Guyana

Karatay Congress and Sport Center, Konya

==== Group C ====
Pos	Team	Pld	W	L	PF	PA	PD
1	Azerbaijan	4	4	0	57	38	+19
2	Mali	4	2	2	48	46	+2
3	Turkey	4	2	2	44	53	−9
4	Morocco	4	2	2	40	52	−12
—	Gabon	4	0	4	0	0	0

Source: FIBA

13 August
16:20

Azerbaijan	18–15	Mali

Karatay Congress and Sport Center, Konya

13 August
16:45

Morocco	vs.	Gabon
Forfeit

Karatay Congress and Sport Center, Konya

13 August
18:10

Mali	13–17	Morocco

Karatay Congress and Sport Center, Konya

13 August
18:35

Gabon	vs.	Turkey
Forfeit

Karatay Congress and Sport Center, Konya

13 August
21:00

Azerbaijan	21–12	Turkey

Karatay Congress and Sport Center, Konya

15 August
17:45

Morocco	11–18	Azerbaijan

Karatay Congress and Sport Center, Konya

15 August
18:10

Mali	vs.	Gabon
Forfeit

Karatay Congress and Sport Center, Konya

15 August
19:00

Turkey	11–20	Mali

Karatay Congress and Sport Center, Konya

15 August
19:35

Gabon	vs.	Azerbaijan
Forfeit

Karatay Congress and Sport Center, Konya

15 August
20:50

Turkey	21–12	Morocco

Karatay Congress and Sport Center, Konya

==== Group D ====
Pos	Team	Pld	W	L	PF	PA	PD
1	Suriname	4	4	0	38	27	+11
2	Turkmenistan	4	3	1	29	30	−1
3	Kyrgyzstan	4	2	2	31	41	−10
—	Iraq	4	0	4	0	0	0
—	Sudan	4	0	4	0	0	0

Source: FIBA

14 August
17:45

Sudan	vs.	Turkmenistan
Forfeit

Karatay Congress and Sport Center, Konya

14 August
18:35

Iraq	vs.	Suriname
Forfeit

Karatay Congress and Sport Center, Konya

14 August
19:10

Kyrgyzstan	vs.	Sudan
Forfeit

Karatay Congress and Sport Center, Konya

14 August
20:00

Iraq	vs.	Turkmenistan
Forfeit

Karatay Congress and Sport Center, Konya

14 August
20:25

Suriname	20–19	Kyrgyzstan

Karatay Congress and Sport Center, Konya

16 August
16:20

Iraq	vs.	Sudan
Forfeit

Karatay Congress and Sport Center, Konya

16 August
16:45

Turkmenistan	8–18	Suriname

Karatay Congress and Sport Center, Konya

16 August
19:10

Turkmenistan	21–12	Kyrgyzstan

Karatay Congress and Sport Center, Konya

16 August
19:35

Suriname	vs.	Sudan
Forfeit

Karatay Congress and Sport Center, Konya

16 August
20:50

Kyrgyzstan	vs.	Iraq
Forfeit

Karatay Congress and Sport Center, Konya

=== Knockout round ===
Quarterfinals
17 August
Senegal	13
Mali	7
17 August
Suriname	16
Uganda	13
17 August
Iran	21
Turkmenistan	11
17 August
Azerbaijan (OT)	20
Jordan	18

Semifinals
17 August
Senegal	21
Suriname	18
17 August
Iran	17
Azerbaijan	21

Gold medal game
17 August
Senegal	21
Azerbaijan	16
Bronze medal game
17 August
Suriname	11
Iran	21

==== Quarterfinals ====
17 August
15:30

Senegal	13–7	Mali

Karatay Congress and Sport Center, Konya

17 August
15:55

Suriname	16–13	Uganda

Karatay Congress and Sport Center, Konya

17 August
16:20

Iran	21–11	Turkmenistan

Karatay Congress and Sport Center, Konya

17 August
16:45

Azerbaijan	20–18 (OT)	Jordan

Karatay Congress and Sport Center, Konya

==== Semifinals ====
17 August
18:10

Senegal	21–18	Suriname

Karatay Congress and Sport Center, Konya

17 August
18:35

Iran	17–21	Azerbaijan

Karatay Congress and Sport Center, Konya

==== Bronze medal game ====
17 August
19:35

Suriname	11–21	Iran

Karatay Congress and Sport Center, Konya

==== Gold medal game ====
17 August
20:35

Senegal	21–16	Azerbaijan

Karatay Congress and Sport Center, Konya

== Women ==
=== Preliminary round ===
==== Group A ====
Pos	Team	Pld	W	L	PF	PA	PD
1	Saudi Arabia	2	2	0	20	19	+1
2	Qatar	2	1	1	19	20	−1
—	Jordan	2	0	2	0	0	0

Source: FIBA

14 August
10:25

Qatar	vs.	Jordan
Forfeit

Karatay Congress and Sport Center, Konya

14 August
11:50

Saudi Arabia	vs.	Jordan
Forfeit

Karatay Congress and Sport Center, Konya

14 August
13:05

Qatar	19–20	Saudi Arabia

Karatay Congress and Sport Center, Konya

==== Group B ====
Pos	Team	Pld	W	L	PF	PA	PD
1	Uzbekistan	2	2	0	25	20	+5
2	Mali	2	1	1	32	20	+12
3	Uganda	2	0	2	17	34	−17

Source: FIBA

15 August
15:55

Uzbekistan	13–10	Mali

Karatay Congress and Sport Center, Konya

15 August
17:10

Uganda	7–22	Mali

Karatay Congress and Sport Center, Konya

15 August
18:35

Uzbekistan	12–10	Uganda

Karatay Congress and Sport Center, Konya

==== Group C ====
Pos	Team	Pld	W	L	PF	PA	PD
1	Azerbaijan	2	2	0	35	16	+19
2	Turkey	2	1	1	33	17	+16
3	Kyrgyzstan	2	0	2	7	42	−35

Source: FIBA

13 August
18:10

Turkey	12–14	Azerbaijan

Karatay Congress and Sport Center, Konya

13 August
19:35

Kyrgyzstan	4–21	Azerbaijan

Karatay Congress and Sport Center, Konya

13 August
21:00

Turkey	21–3	Kyrgyzstan

Karatay Congress and Sport Center, Konya

==== Group D ====
Pos	Team	Pld	W	L	PF	PA	PD
1	Senegal	3	3	0	56	29	+27
2	Iran	3	1	2	54	42	+12
3	Turkmenistan	3	1	2	42	53	−11
4	Gambia	3	1	2	25	53	−28

Source: FIBA

13 August
17:20

Turkmenistan	11–13	Gambia

Karatay Congress and Sport Center, Konya

13 August
17:45

Iran	13–15 (OT)	Senegal

Karatay Congress and Sport Center, Konya

13 August
20:00

Gambia	6–21	Senegal

Karatay Congress and Sport Center, Konya

13 August
20:25

Turkmenistan	21–20	Iran

Karatay Congress and Sport Center, Konya

15 August
20:00

Iran	21–6	Gambia

Karatay Congress and Sport Center, Konya

15 August
20:25

Senegal	20–10	Turkmenistan

Karatay Congress and Sport Center, Konya

=== Knockout round ===
Quarterfinals
16 August
Saudi Arabia	7
Turkey	21
16 August
Senegal	13
Mali	17
16 August
Uzbekistan	18
Iran	9
16 August
Azerbaijan	21
Qatar	2

Semifinals
17 August
Turkey	11
Mali	16
17 August
Uzbekistan	7
Azerbaijan	16

Gold medal game
17 August
Mali	6
Azerbaijan	21
Bronze medal game
17 August
Turkey	14
Uzbekistan	10

==== Quarterfinals ====
16 August
15:55

Saudi Arabia	7–21	Turkey

Karatay Congress and Sport Center, Konya

16 August
17:20

Senegal	13–17	Mali

Karatay Congress and Sport Center, Konya

16 August
18:35

Uzbekistan	18–9	Iran

Karatay Congress and Sport Center, Konya

16 August
20:00

Azerbaijan	21–2	Qatar

Karatay Congress and Sport Center, Konya

==== Semifinals ====
17 August
17:20

Turkey	11–16	Mali

Karatay Congress and Sport Center, Konya

17 August
17:45

Uzbekistan	7–16	Azerbaijan

Karatay Congress and Sport Center, Konya

==== Bronze medal match ====
17 August
19:10

Turkey	14–10	Uzbekistan

Karatay Congress and Sport Center, Konya

==== Gold medal match ====
17 August
20:10

Mali	6–21	Azerbaijan

Karatay Congress and Sport Center, Konya
