= Zizima =

Town of ancient Lycaonia

Coordinates: 38°05′24″N 32°24′07″E

Zizima was a town of ancient Lycaonia, inhabited in Roman times. The name does not occur among ancient authors but is inferred from epigraphic and other evidence.

Its site is located near Sizma, Asiatic Turkey.
