= Handball at the 2021 Islamic Solidarity Games =

- Venue: Selçuklu Municipality International Sports Hall
- Dates: 7–14 August 2022

The handball tournaments at the 2021 Islamic Solidarity Games in Konya occurred between 7 August and 14 August 2021. The handball competition took place at Selçuklu Municipality International Sports Hall in Konya. 4 teams in 2 groups played in a single round-robin system with a one-day interval between each other, and the group competitions were completed in the first 6 days. On Day 7, semi-finals are played an on day 8, the third place and final competitions were played. Group winners and runners-up were cross-matched in the quarter-finals A1-B2 and A2-B1, Winners compete for Gold, and losers for Bronze Medals.

The Games were originally scheduled to take place from 20 to 29 August 2021 in Konya, Turkey. In May 2020, the Islamic Solidarity Sports Federation (ISSF), who are responsible for the direction and control of the Islamic Solidarity Games, postponed the games as the 2020 Summer Olympics were postponed to July and August 2021, due to the global COVID-19 pandemic.

== Medalists ==
Event	Gold	Silver	Bronze
Men	Qatar; Abdelrahman Abdalla; Mohammed Abdelmageed; Nour Ahmed; Hamdi Ayed; Zineeooine Boumendjel; Faruk Colo; Amir Denguir; Ahmed Elmeniawy; Amine Guehis; Moustafa Heiba; Salem Jedaied; Hani Kakhi; Rayan Laribi; Ahmed Saleh; Mohamed Soussi; Rasheed Yusuff; Ameen Zakkar; Anis Zouaoui	Turkey; Alper Aydın; Hüseyin Bereket; Enis Yatkın; Enis Harun Hacıoğlu; Baran Nalbantoğlu; Fatih Çalkamış; Sedat Yıldırım; Gökay Bilim; Atakan Şirin; Eray Karakoç; Durmuş Ali Tınkır; Cemal Kütahya; Doğukan Keser; Şevket Yağmuroğlu; Alper Aydın; İlkan Keleşoğlu	Iran; Ehsan Aboueimehrizi; Younes Asari; Afshin Sadeghi Askari; Salaman Barbat; Mohammadmahdi Behnamnia; Sajad Esteki; Milad Ghalandari; Mojtaba Heidarpour; Mohammadreza Kazemi; Ali Kouhzad; Seyedalireza Mousavighalehmirzamani; Shahoo Nosrati; Mohammadreza Oraei; Ali Rahimikazerooni; Shahab Sadeghzadeh; Mohammad Siavoshishahenayati
Women	Turkey; Merve Durdu; Halime İslamoğlu; Kübra Sarıkaya; Elif Sıla Aydın; Emine Gökdemir; Bilgenur Öztürk; Neslihan Çalışkan; Betül Yılmaz; Ayşenur Sormaz; Yasemin Şahin; Gülcan Tügel; Beyza Karaçam; Merve Özbolluk; Cansu Akalın; Ceren Demirçelen; Meryem Erdoğan	Azerbaijan; Gunel Aliyeva; Alyona Barbakadze; Kamila Bayramova; Milica Grbavcevic; Azaliya Hasanova; Rana Hasanova; Elnara Ibrahimova; Vlada Kosmina; Minaya Mammadova; Irina Mikhalkovich; Madina Musayeva; Milana Rzayeva; Yelizaveta Salimova; Ulviyya Sharifova; Irana Shukurova; Sabina Smagina	Cameroon; Manga Benedicte; Ngouoko Celeste; Ebanga Cyrielle; Efouba Farella; Megaptche Flore; Mbouchou Florette; Eyenga Jossy; Maffo Laure; Awu Bessong-Epah Linda; Feudji Lupin; Tenang Dzoyem Marie; Magba Michaella; Nock Arlette Nadia; Mben Noelle; Nyamsi Orchelle; Ateba Petronie; Kongnyuy Sifan; Nkomidio Prisca Therese; Yuoh Yvette; Ewodo Louise Yvonne

== Medal table ==
* Host nation (Turkey)

Rank	Nation	Gold	Silver	Bronze	Total
1	Turkey*	1	1	0	2
2	Qatar	1	0	0	1
3	Azerbaijan	0	1	0	1
4	Cameroon	0	0	1	1
4	Iran	0	0	1	1
Totals (5 entries)		2	2	2	6

== Men's tournament ==
=== Preliminary round ===
All times are local (UTC+3).

==== Group A ====
Pos	Team	Pld	W	D	L	GF	GA	GD	Pts	Qualification
1	Saudi Arabia	2	1	1	0	56	52	+4	3	Semifinals
2	Qatar	2	1	1	0	49	47	+2	3	Semifinals
3	Morocco	2	0	0	2	45	51	−6	0	Fifth place game

Rules for classification: 1) Points; 2) Head-to-head points; 3) Head-to-head goal difference; 4) Head-to-head goals scored; 5) Goal difference; 6) Goals scored; 7) Draw.

8 August 2022; 13:00	Qatar	22–20	Morocco	Selçuklu Municipality International Sports Hall, Selçuklu
8 August 2022; 13:00		(11–10)		Selçuklu Municipality International Sports Hall, Selçuklu

10 August 2022; 11:00	Saudi Arabia	29–25	Morocco	Selçuklu Municipality International Sports Hall, Selçuklu
10 August 2022; 11:00		(11–13)		Selçuklu Municipality International Sports Hall, Selçuklu

12 August 2022; 11:00	Qatar	27–27	Saudi Arabia	Selçuklu Municipality International Sports Hall, Selçuklu
12 August 2022; 11:00		(13–14)		Selçuklu Municipality International Sports Hall, Selçuklu

==== Group B ====
Pos	Team	Pld	W	D	L	GF	GA	GD	Pts	Qualification
1	Iran	2	2	0	0	68	40	+28	4	Semifinals
2	Turkey (H)	2	1	0	1	49	45	+4	2	Semifinals
3	Azerbaijan	2	0	0	2	39	71	−32	0	Fifth place game

Rules for classification: 1) Points; 2) Head-to-head points; 3) Head-to-head goal difference; 4) Head-to-head goals scored; 5) Goal difference; 6) Goals scored; 7) Draw.
(H) Hosts

8 August 2022; 15:00	Turkey	20–26	Iran	Selçuklu Municipality International Sports Hall, Selçuklu
8 August 2022; 15:00		(9–11)		Selçuklu Municipality International Sports Hall, Selçuklu

10 August 2022; 15:00	Azerbaijan	19–29	Turkey	Selçuklu Municipality International Sports Hall, Selçuklu
10 August 2022; 15:00		(9–11)		Selçuklu Municipality International Sports Hall, Selçuklu

12 August 2022; 15:00	Iran	42–20	Azerbaijan	Selçuklu Municipality International Sports Hall, Selçuklu
12 August 2022; 15:00		(24–8)		Selçuklu Municipality International Sports Hall, Selçuklu

=== Knockout stage ===
==== Bracket ====
Semifinals
13 August – 15:00
Saudi Arabia	25
Turkey	26
13 August – 17:00
Iran	23
Qatar	24

Final
14 August –
Turkey	23
Qatar	26
Third place
14 August –
Saudi Arabia	21
Iran	30

==== Semifinals ====
13 August 2022; 15:00	Saudi Arabia	25–26	Turkey	Selçuklu Municipality International Sports Hall, Selçuklu
13 August 2022; 15:00		(15–16)		Selçuklu Municipality International Sports Hall, Selçuklu

13 August 2022; 17:00	Iran	23–24	Qatar	Selçuklu Municipality International Sports Hall, Selçuklu
13 August 2022; 17:00		(11–14)		Selçuklu Municipality International Sports Hall, Selçuklu

==== Fifth place game ====
Cancelled	Azerbaijan	10–0	Morocco	Selçuklu Municipality International Sports Hall, Selçuklu

==== Bronze medal game ====
14 August 2022; 13:00	Saudi Arabia	21–30	Iran	Selçuklu Municipality International Sports Hall, Selçuklu
14 August 2022; 13:00		(9–10)		Selçuklu Municipality International Sports Hall, Selçuklu

==== Gold medal game ====
14 August 2022; 18:00	Turkey	23–26	Qatar	Selçuklu Municipality International Sports Hall, Selçuklu
14 August 2022; 18:00		(10–14)		Selçuklu Municipality International Sports Hall, Selçuklu

== Women's tournament ==
=== Preliminary round ===
==== Group A ====
Pos	Team	Pld	W	D	L	GF	GA	GD	Pts	Qualification
1	Turkey (H)	3	3	0	0	127	62	+65	6	Semifinals
2	Uzbekistan	3	2	0	1	99	89	+10	4	Semifinals
3	Senegal	3	1	0	2	95	87	+8	2	Fifth place game
4	Bangladesh	3	0	0	3	55	138	−83	0	Seventh place game

Rules for classification: 1) Points; 2) Head-to-head points; 3) Head-to-head goal difference; 4) Head-to-head goals scored; 5) Goal difference; 6) Goals scored; 7) Draw.
(H) Hosts

7 August 2022; 11:00	Senegal	27–28	Uzbekistan	Selçuklu Municipality International Sports Hall, Selçuklu

7 August 2022; 13:00	Bangladesh	10–51	Turkey	Selçuklu Municipality International Sports Hall, Selçuklu
7 August 2022; 13:00		(4–26)		Selçuklu Municipality International Sports Hall, Selçuklu

9 August 2022; 11:00	Senegal	23–34	Turkey	Selçuklu Municipality International Sports Hall, Selçuklu
9 August 2022; 11:00		(14–16)		Selçuklu Municipality International Sports Hall, Selçuklu

9 August 2022; 13:00	Uzbekistan	42–20	Bangladesh	Selçuklu Municipality International Sports Hall, Selçuklu

11 August 2022; 11:00	Senegal	45–25	Bangladesh	Selçuklu Municipality International Sports Hall, Selçuklu

11 August 2022; 13:00	Turkey	42–29	Uzbekistan	Selçuklu Municipality International Sports Hall, Selçuklu
11 August 2022; 13:00		(23–14)		Selçuklu Municipality International Sports Hall, Selçuklu

==== Group B ====
Pos	Team	Pld	W	D	L	GF	GA	GD	Pts	Qualification
1	Azerbaijan	3	3	0	0	79	26	+53	6	Semifinals
2	Cameroon	3	2	0	1	52	39	+13	4	Semifinals
3	Iran	3	1	0	2	89	74	+15	2	Fifth place game
4	Afghanistan	3	0	0	3	15	96	−81	0	Seventh place game

Rules for classification: 1) Points; 2) Head-to-head points; 3) Head-to-head goal difference; 4) Head-to-head goals scored; 5) Goal difference; 6) Goals scored; 7) Draw.

Cancelled	Cameroon	0–10 (Note: The match, originally scheduled for 7 August 2022, was not played after the Cameroonian team did not arrive in time. It was counted as a 10–0 win for Azerbaijan.)	Azerbaijan	Selçuklu Municipality International Sports Hall, Selçuklu

7 August 2022; 17:00	Afghanistan	6–43	Iran	Selçuklu Municipality International Sports Hall, Selçuklu

9 August 2022; 15:00	Cameroon	42–29	Iran	Selçuklu Municipality International Sports Hall, Selçuklu

9 August 2022; 17:00	Azerbaijan	43–9	Afghanistan	Selçuklu Municipality International Sports Hall, Selçuklu

11 August 2022; 15:00	Cameroon	10–0	Afghanistan	Selçuklu Municipality International Sports Hall, Selçuklu

11 August 2022; 17:00	Iran	17–26	Azerbaijan	Selçuklu Municipality International Sports Hall, Selçuklu

=== Knockout stage ===
==== Bracket ====
Semifinals
13 August
Turkey	34
Cameroon	23
13 August
Azerbaijan	40
Uzbekistan	27

Final
14 August – 15:00
Turkey	30
Azerbaijan	24
Third place
14 August – 13:00
Cameroon	40
Uzbekistan	27

==== Semifinals ====
13 August 2022; 11:00	Turkey	34–23	Cameroon	Selçuklu Municipality International Sports Hall, Selçuklu
13 August 2022; 11:00		(14–10)		Selçuklu Municipality International Sports Hall, Selçuklu

13 August 2022; 13:00	Azerbaijan	40–27	Uzbekistan	Selçuklu Municipality International Sports Hall, Selçuklu
13 August 2022; 13:00		(19–13)		Selçuklu Municipality International Sports Hall, Selçuklu

==== Seventh place game ====
12 August 2022	Afghanistan	20–33	Bangladesh	Selçuklu Municipality International Sports Hall, Selçuklu

==== Fifth place game ====
12 August 2022	Senegal	25–24	Iran	Selçuklu Municipality International Sports Hall, Selçuklu

==== Bronze medal game ====
14 August 2022; 13:00	Cameroon	40–27	Uzbekistan	Selçuklu Municipality International Sports Hall, Selçuklu

==== Gold medal game ====
14 August 2022; 15:00	Turkey	30–24	Azerbaijan	Selçuklu Municipality International Sports Hall, Selçuklu
14 August 2022; 15:00		(14–10)		Selçuklu Municipality International Sports Hall, Selçuklu
