= Afghanistan at the 2021 Islamic Solidarity Games =

- IOC code: AFG
- NOC: Afghanistan National Olympic Committee

in Konya, Turkey
- Medals: Gold 0 Silver 0 Bronze 0 Total 0

Islamic Solidarity Games appearances
- 2005; 2013; 2017; 2021; 2025

Afghanistan participated in the 2021 Islamic Solidarity Games held in Konya, Turkey from 9 to 18 August 2022.

The games had been rescheduled several times. In May 2021, the ISSF postponed the event to August 2022 citing the COVID-19 pandemic situation in the participating countries.

== Medalists ==
Medal	Name	Sport	Event	Date

Medals by sport
Sport	1st place, gold medalist(s)	2nd place, silver medalist(s)	3rd place, bronze medalist(s)	Total
Archery	0	0	0	0
Athletics	0	0	0	0
Bocce	0	0	0	0
Gymnastics	0	0	0	0
Karate	0	0	0	0
Swimming	0	0	0	0
Taekwondo	0	0	0	0
Volleyball	0	0	0	0
Weightlifting	0	0	0	0
Wrestling	0	0	0	0
Total	0	0	0	0

== Handball ==
=== Women's tournament ===
Group B

Pos	Team	Pld	W	D	L	GF	GA	GD	Pts	Qualification
1	Azerbaijan	3	3	0	0	79	26	+53	6	Semifinals
2	Cameroon	3	2	0	1	52	39	+13	4	Semifinals
3	Iran	3	1	0	2	89	74	+15	2	Fifth place game
4	Afghanistan	3	0	0	3	15	96	−81	0	Seventh place game

Rules for classification: 1) Points; 2) Head-to-head points; 3) Head-to-head goal difference; 4) Head-to-head goals scored; 5) Goal difference; 6) Goals scored; 7) Draw.

7 August 2022; 17:00	Afghanistan	6–43	Iran	Selçuklu Municipality International Sports Hall, Selçuklu

9 August 2022; 17:00	Azerbaijan	43–9	Afghanistan	Selçuklu Municipality International Sports Hall, Selçuklu

11 August 2022; 15:00	Cameroon	10–0	Afghanistan	Selçuklu Municipality International Sports Hall, Selçuklu

Seventh place game

12 August 2022	Afghanistan	20–33	Bangladesh	Selçuklu Municipality International Sports Hall, Selçuklu

== Volleyball ==
=== Women's tournament ===
Pool B

Pos	Team	Pld	W	L	Pts	SW	SL	SR	SPW	SPL	SPR
1	Azerbaijan	3	3	0	9	9	1	9.000	257	119	2.160
2	Cameroon	3	2	1	6	7	3	2.333	227	189	1.201
3	Senegal	3	1	2	3	3	6	0.500	142	189	0.751
4	Afghanistan	3	0	3	0	0	9	0.000	96	225	0.427

Source: TVF

Date	Time		Score		Set 1	Set 2	Set 3	Set 4	Set 5	Total	Report
09 Aug	13:00	Afghanistan	0–3	Cameroon	16–25	7–25	15–25			38–75	Report
10 Aug	13:00	Afghanistan	0–3	Azerbaijan	4–25	11–25	4–25			19–75	Report
12 Aug	16:00	Afghanistan	0–3	Senegal	22–25	8–25	9–25			39–75	Report
