= Hacıveyiszade Mosque =

Mosque in Konya, Turkey

- Hacıveyiszade Cami ve Külliyesi
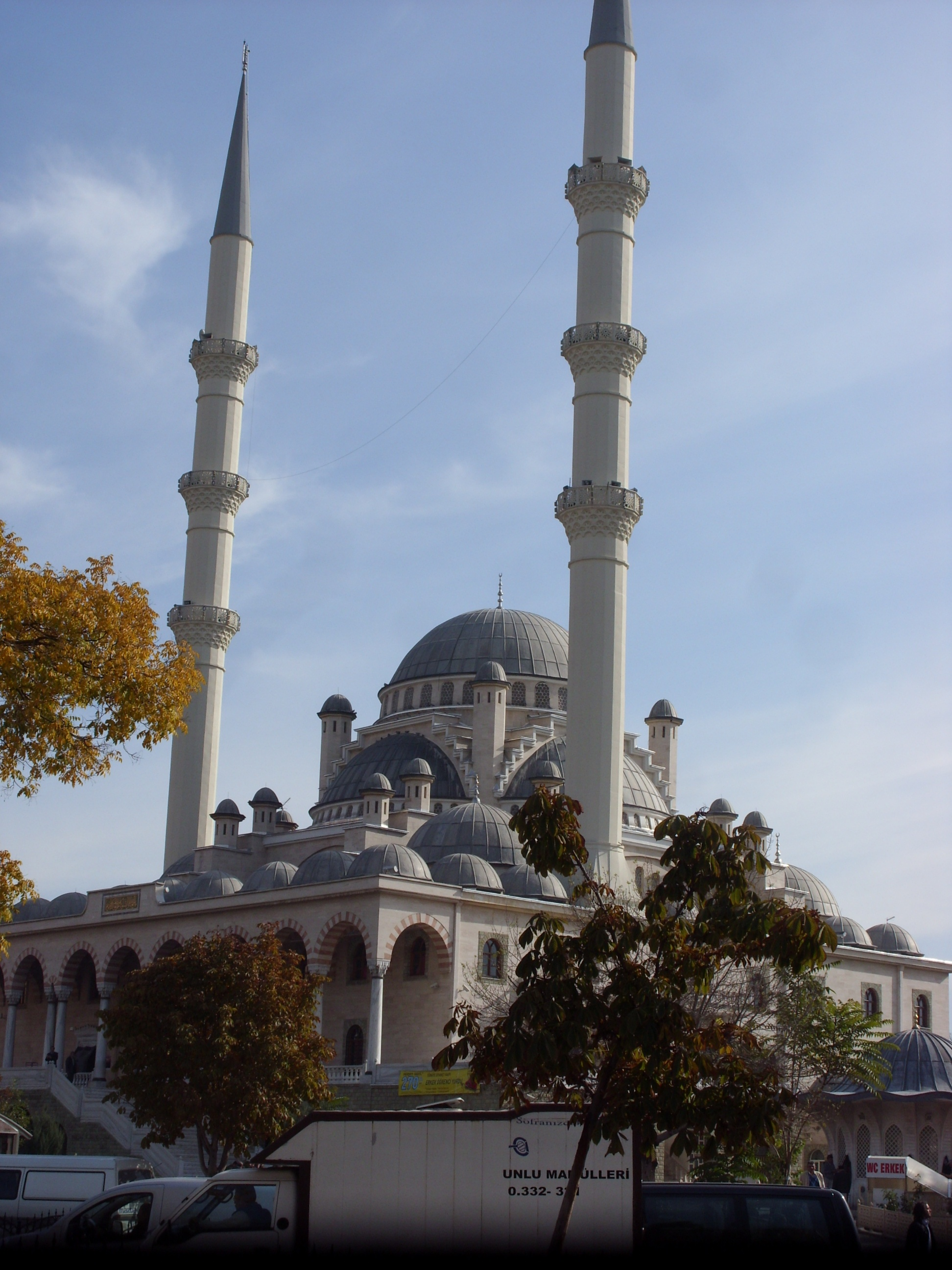

- Location in Turkey

Religion
- Affiliation: Islam
- Leadership: Imam(s): İsmail Öden
- Status: Open to worship

Location
- Location: Selçuklu, Konya, Turkey
- Administration: Turkey government
- Coordinates: 37.87°N 32.48°E

Architecture
- Architect: Mustafa Özkarakaya
- Type: Mosque
- Style: Islamic, Late Classical Ottoman
- Groundbreaking: 1986
- Completed: 1996

Specifications
- Capacity: 4,500
- Dome dia. (inner): 26 m (85 ft)
- Minaret: 2
- Minaret height: 78 m (256 ft)

Website
- konya.diyanet.gov.tr

Hacıveyiszade Mosque (Turkish: Hacıveyiszade Camii) is a mosque situated in the center of the city of Konya in the Anatolia region of Turkey. It was built in memory of Hacıveyiszade Mustafa Kurucu Hoca Efendi, one of the renowned religious scholars of Konya of the recent times.

The construction of the mosque was started by the Turkish Religious Foundation (Turkish: Türkiye Diyanet Vakfı) in 1986. It resembles the classical Ottoman architectural style. The mosque has 2 minarets with three balconies each. They are the tallest minarets in the region with a height of 78 meters. There are shops, lounges and a place for the mufti under the mosque; and due to that, it is a complex, or in original saying - a Külliye. The mosque has a capacity of 4,500 people while the complex has a capacity of 10,000.

The Hacıveyiszade Mosque and Complex was completed in 1996 and opened to worship.
