= Merve Adıyaman =

Turkish handball player (born 1994)

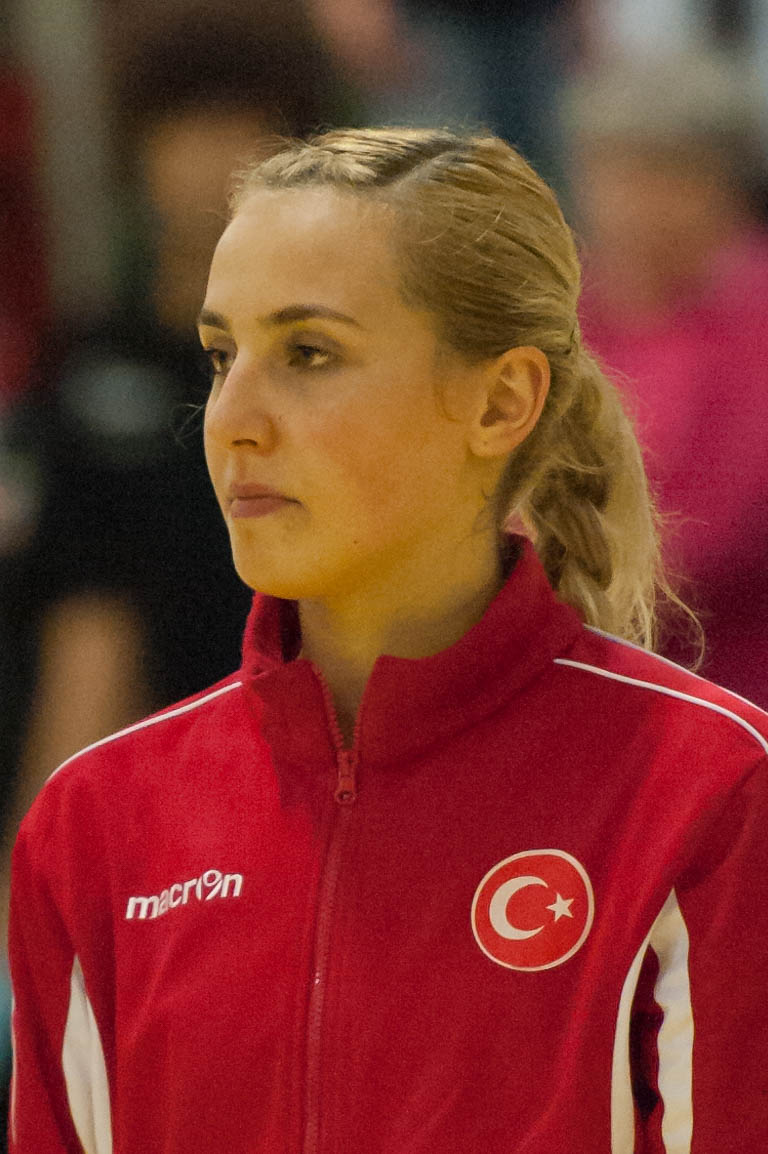
- Merve Adıyaman at the 2015 World Women's Handball Championship qualification.

Personal information
- Born: 12 September 1994 (age 32) Istanbul, Turkey
- Height: 1.80 m (5 ft 11 in)

Sport
- Sport: Handball
- Position: Right Back
- Current club: Üsküdar Bld. SK
- Number: 7
National team
- Years: Team
- –: Turkey
Medal record
Representing Turkey
Women's Handball
Islamic Solidarity Games
Gold medal – first place	2021 Konya	Team

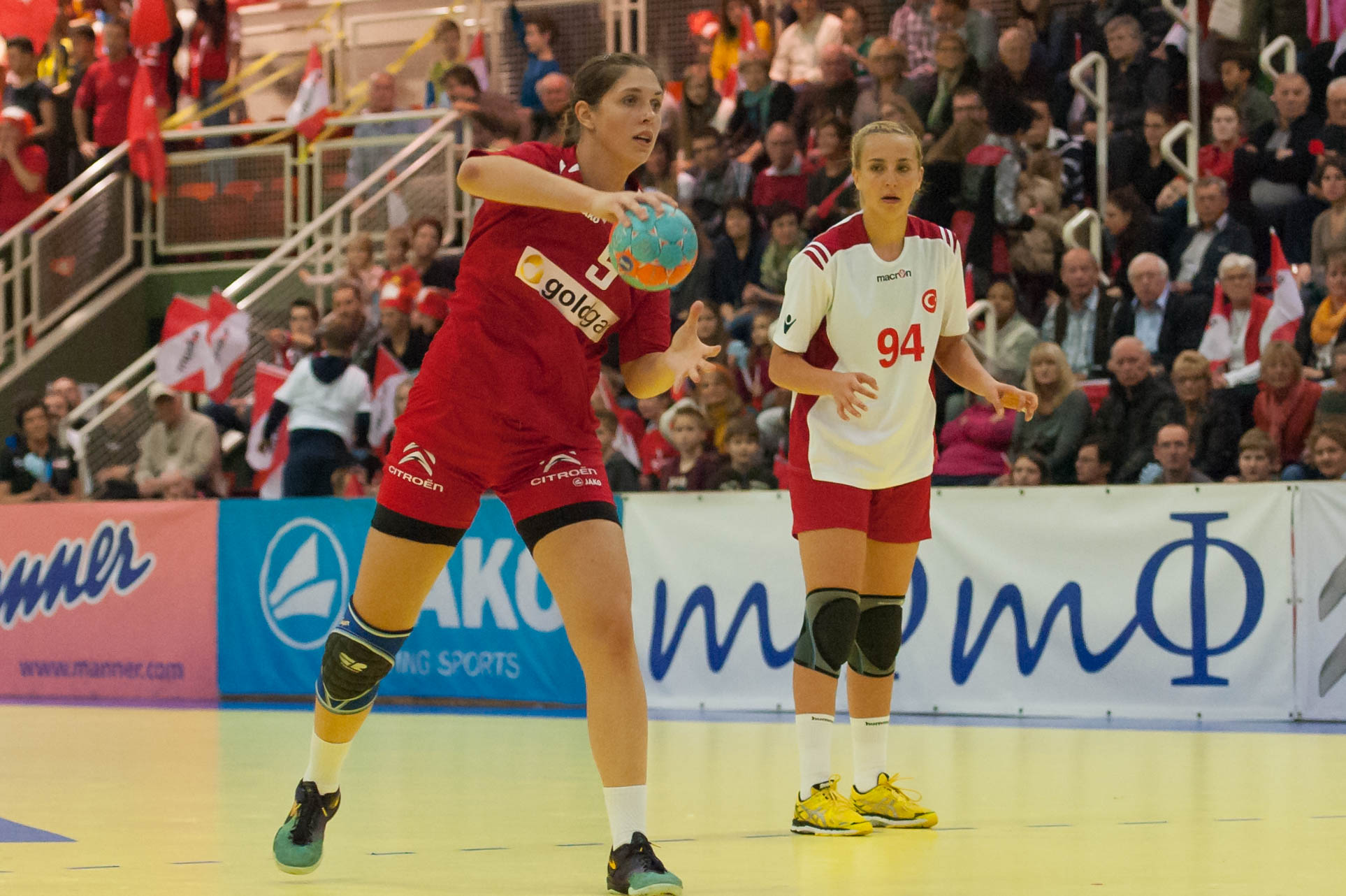
Merve Adıyaman (right) at the 2015 World Women's Handball Championship European qualification match against Austria.

Merve Adıyaman (born 12 September 1994), also known as Merve Özbolluk, is a Turkish women's handballer, who plays in the Turkish Women's Handball Super League for Üsküdar Bld. SK, and the Turkey national team. The 1.80 m (5 ft 11 in)-tall sportswoman plays in the right back position.

She was named Golden Seven (Turkish: Altın Yedi) member of the 2022–23 Super League season by the Turkey Handball Federation.

In 2022, she played in the national team, which became champion at the 5th Islamic Solidarity Games in Konya, Turkey.

She also plays beach handball, where she is also on the national team.

== Honours ==
=== Individual ===
Turkish Women's Handball Super League
Golden Seven member (1): 2022–223 Üsküdar Bld. SK)

=== International ===
Turkey women's national handball team

Islamic Solidarity Games
Champion (1): 2021
