= Halime İslamoğlu =

Turkish handball player (born 1993)

- Born: Halime Cemre Beykurt; 10 September 1993 (age 33); Urla, İzmir, Turkey
- Handball career
- Height: 1.72 m (5 ft 8 in)
- Sport: Handball
- Position: Goalkeeper
- Current club: İzmir Büyükşehir Bld. GSK
- Number: 35

Youth career
- Years: Team
- –: Urla GSK

Senior clubs
- Years: Team
- 2012–2014: Üsküdar Bld. SK
- 2017–2019: Ardeşen GSK
- 2019–2020: İzmir Büyükşehir BBld. GSK
- 2020–2022: Kastamonu Bld. GSK
- 2022–: İzmir Büyükşehir BBld. GSK
National team
- Years: Team
- –: Turkey
Medal record
Representing Turkey
Women's Handball
Islamic Solidarity Games
Gold medal – first place	2021 Konya	Team

Halime İslamoğlu (born Halime Cemre Beykurt; 10 September 1993) is a Turkish women's handballer, who plays as goalkeeper for İzmir Büyükşehir Bld. GSK, and the Turkey national team.

== Personal life ==
Halime Cemre Beykurt was born in Urla, İzmir, Turkey on 10 September 1993. She studied physical education at Trakya University in Edirne.

She married Dursun Ali İslamoğlu, the former assistant coach of the Ardeşen GSK, on 13 September 2020, and took her spouse's surname.

Beykurt started her handball playing career at the hometown club Urla GSK, and played in the youth Çi9 team.

She is 1.72 m (5 ft 8 in) tall at 68 kg (150 lb). She plays in the goalkeeper position.

=== Üsküdar Bld. SK ===
Beykurt played with Üsküdar Bld. SK in the 2012–13 and 2013–14 Turkish Women's Handball Super League seasons.

She participated at the 2012–13 EHF Challenge Cup, and EHF Cup Winners' Cup 2013/14.

=== Ardeşen GSK ===
She moved to Rize to join Ardeşen GSK. She played in the 2017–18 and 2018–19 Super League seasons.

She took part at the 2017–18 EHF Challenge Cup,

=== İzmir Büyükşehir Bld. GSK ===
For the 2019–20 Super League season, she returned to her hometown İzmir, and joined İzmir Büyükşehir BBld. GSK. After her first season, she left her club mid August 2020.

=== Kastamonu Bld. GSK ===
In August 2020, she transferred for the 2020–21 Super League season to Kastamonu Bld. GSK. She appeared also in the 2021–22 season.

She participated at the 2020–21 EHF European League, and 2021–22 EHF Champions League group stage.

=== İzmir Büyükşehir Bld. GSK ===
İslamoğlu transferred to İzmir Büyükşehir Bld. GSK again for the 2022–23 season. She was named Best Goalkeeper and Golden Seven (Turkish: Altın Yedi) member of the 2022–23 Super League season by the Turkey Handball Federation.

She played in the 2022–23 EHF European Cup.

== International career ==
İslamoğlu is a member of the Turkey women's national handball team. Beykurt participated at the 2018 Mediterranean Games held in Tarragona, Spain. In 2022, İslamoğlu won the gold medal at the Islamic Solidarity Games in Konya, Turkey.

== Honours ==
=== Individual ===
Turkish Women's Handball Super League
Best Goalkeeper (1): 2022–23 (İzmir Büyükşehir Bld. GSK)
Golden Seven member (1): 2022–223 (İzmir Büyükşehir Bld. GSK)

=== Club ===
Turkish Women's Handball Super League

Üsküdar Bld. SK
Runner-up (1): 2012–13.

Ardeşen GSK
Third place (1): 2018–19.

Kastamonu Bld. GSK
Champions (2): 2020–21, 2021–22.

Women's EHF European Cup

Üsküdar Bld. GSK
Third place (1): 2012–13.

Ardeşen GSK
Third place (1): 2017–18.

=== International ===
Turkey women's national handball team

Islamic Solidarity Games
Champion (1): 2021.
