= Kübra Sarıkaya =

Turkish handball player (born 1996)

Personal information
- Nationality: Turkish
- Born: 14 October 1996 (age 30) Istanbul, Turkey
- Height: 1.68 m (5 ft 6 in)

Sport
- Sport: Handball
- Position: Left wing
- Current club: Kastamonu Bld. GSK
- Number: 7

Senior clubs
- Years: Team
- 2018: Polatlı Bld. SK
- 2019–2020: Muratpaşa Bld. SK
- 2020–: Kastamonu Bld. GSK
National team
- Years: Team
- 2018–: Turkey
Medal record
Representing Turkey
Women's handball
Islamic Solidarity Games
Gold medal – first place	2021 Konya	Team

Kübra Sarıkaya (born 14 October 1996) is a Turkish handballer, who plays as left wing for Kastamonu Bld. GSK in the Turkish Super League and the Turkey national team.

== Personal life ==
Kübra Sarıkaya was born in Istanbul, Turkey on 14 October 1996.

== Club career ==
Sarıkaya is 1.68 m (5 ft 6 in) tall at 50 kg (110 lb). She plays in the left wing position.

=== Polatlı Bld. SK ===
She started her handball career at Polatlı Bld. SK in Ankara Province in 2018. She played in the 2018–19 EHF Challenge Cup.

=== Muratpaşa Bld. SK ===
In 2019, she moved to Antalya to join Muratpaşa Bld. SK, where she played two seasons in the Turkish Women's Handball Super League. She took part in the 2019–20 EHF Cup.

=== Kastamonu Bld. GSK ===
In June 2020, she signed a deal with Kastamonu Bld. GSK. She was named Golden Seven (Turkish: Altın Yedi) member of the 2022–23 Super League season by the Turkey Handball Federation. She participated in the 2020–21 EHF European League. She won the 2022–23 Turkish Super League with her team.

== International career ==
She was part of the national team at the 2018 Mediterranean Games held in Tarragona, Spain. In 2022, she played in the national team, which became champion at the 5th Islamic Solidarity Games in Konya, Turkey.

== Honours ==
=== Individual ===
Turkish Women's Handball Super League
Golden Seven member (1): 2022–223 (Kastamonu Bld. GSK)

=== Club ===
Turkish Women's Handball Super League

Kastamonu Bld. GSK
Champions (3): 2020–21, 2021–22, 2022–23.

=== International ===
Turkey women's national handball team
Islamic Solidarity Games

Champions (1): 2021
