= Elif Sıla Aydın =

Turkish handball player (born 1996)

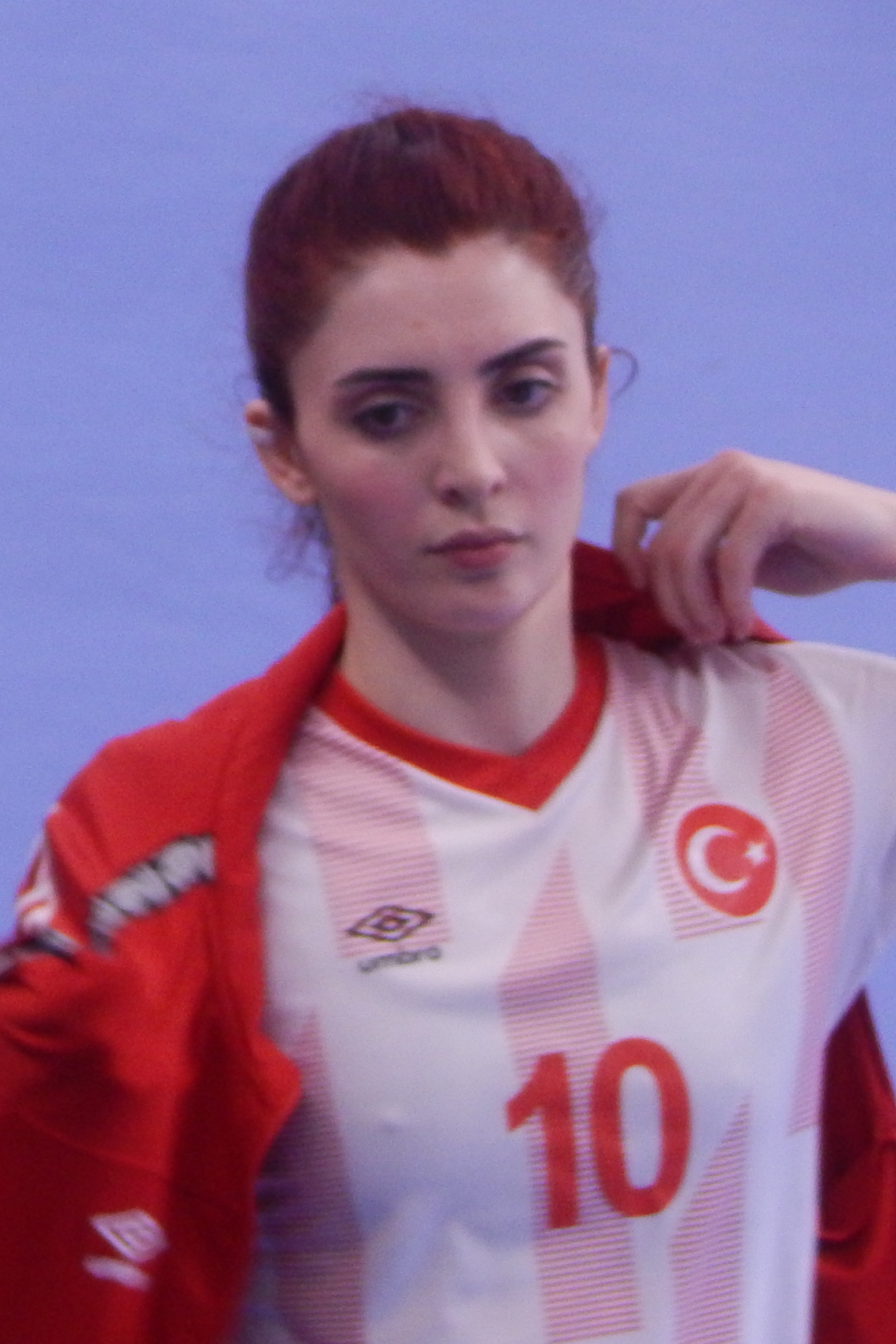
- Elif Sıla Aydın at the 2015 World Women's Handball Championship qualification.

Personal information
- Born: April 11, 1996 (age 30) Ankara, Turkey

Sport
- Sport: Handball
- Position: Left Wing
- Current club: Konyaaltı Belediyesi SK
- Number: 99
National team
- Years: Team
- –: Turkey
Medal record
Representing Turkey
Women's Handball
Islamic Solidarity Games
Gold medal – first place	2021 Konya	Team

Elif Sıla Aydın (born April 11, 1996) is a Turkish women's handballer, who plays in the Turkish Women's Handball Super League for Konyaaltı Belediyesi SK, and the Turkey national team. The 1.73 m (5 ft 8 in)-tall sportswoman plays in the left wing position.

== Personale life ==
Elif Sıla Aydın was born in Ankara, Turkey on April 11, 1996. After finishing high school, she took part in prep courses at Ankara Performance Sport Academy. In 2014, she qualified to study physical education and sports at the Gazi University after completing the courses.

== Club career ==
Elif Sıla Aydın plays for her hometown team Yenimahalle Bld. SK. She took part in the 2014–15 Women's EHF Cup, 2015–16 Women's EHF Cup Winners' Cup and 2015–16 Women's EHF Champions League matches.

She won the league champion title at the end of the 2014–15 season, and won the 2015 Turkish Cup with her team.

== International career ==
Aydın was called up to the Turkey women's national handball team in October 2015. She played at the 2016 European Women's Handball Championship qualification, and 2021 World Women's Handball Championship – European qualification matches. In 2022, she played in the national team, which became champion at the 5th Islamic Solidarity Games in Konya, Turkey.

== Honours ==
=== Club ===
Turkish Women's Handball Super League

- Winner (1): 2014–15.

Turkish Women's Handball Cup

- Winner (1): 2015.

=== International ===
Turkey women's national handball team

Islamic Solidarity Games
Cahnpion (1): 2021
