= Ceren Demirçelen =

Turkish handball player (born 1992)

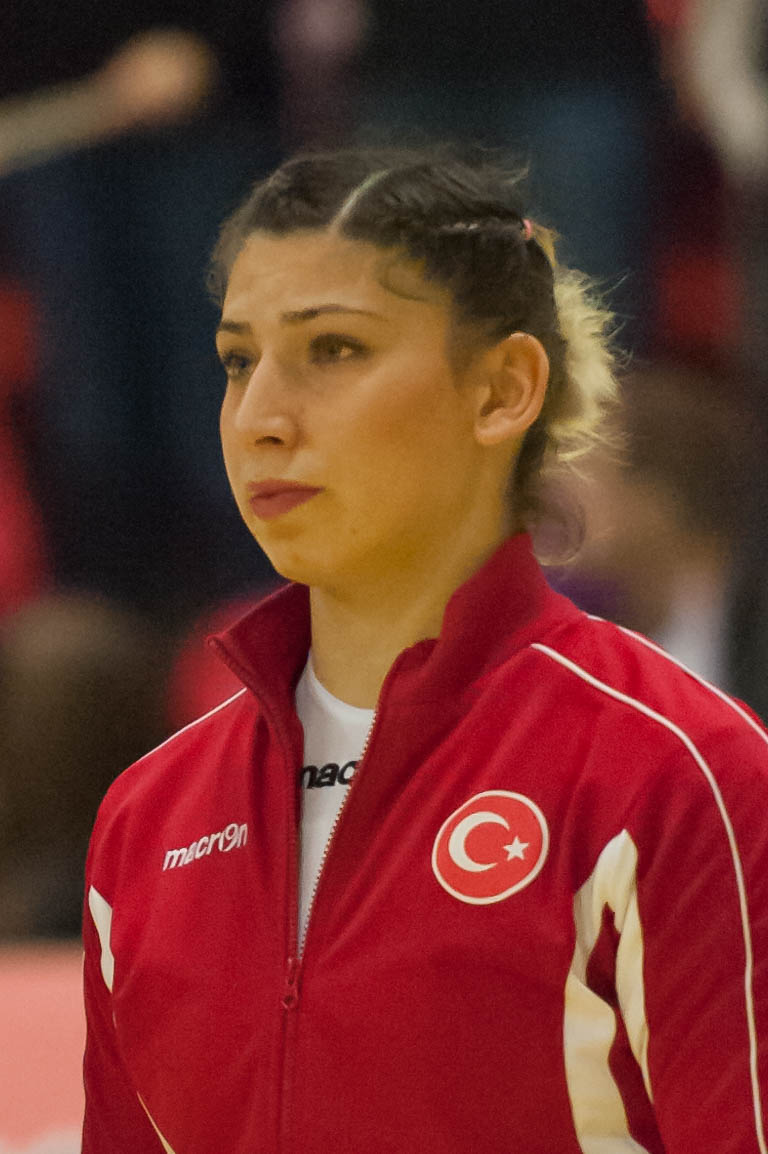
- Ceren Demirçelen at the 2015 World Women's Handball Championship qualification.

Personal information
- Born: February 23, 1992 (age 34) Kastamonu, Turkey
- Height: 1.73 m (5 ft 8 in)

Sport
- Sport: Handball
- Position: Line Player
- Current club: Kastamonu Bld. GSK
- Number: 37
National team
- Years: Team
- –: Turkey
Medal record
Representing Turkey
Women's Handball
Islamic Solidarity Games
Gold medal – first place	2025 Riyadh	Team
Gold medal – first place	2021 Konya	Team

Ceren Demirçelen (born February 23, 1992) is a Turkish women's handballer, who plays in the Turkish Women's Handball Super League for Kastamonu Bld. GSK, and the Turkey national team. The 1.73 m (5 ft 8 in)-tall sportswoman is line player.

== Club career ==
Ceren Demirçelen began her sports career in the 2010–11 season, joining the handball team of Kastamonu University, which played in the Turkish Women's Handball First League. In the 2012–13 and 2013–14 seasons, she played in the Women's Sıper League for Araç Belediyespor, which was renamed to Kastamonu Bld. GSK in July 2014. She continued to remain on the squad of Kastamonu Bld. GSK in the coming seasons.

She participated in the 2015–16 Women's EHF Challenge Cup with Kastamonu Bld. GSK.

== International career ==
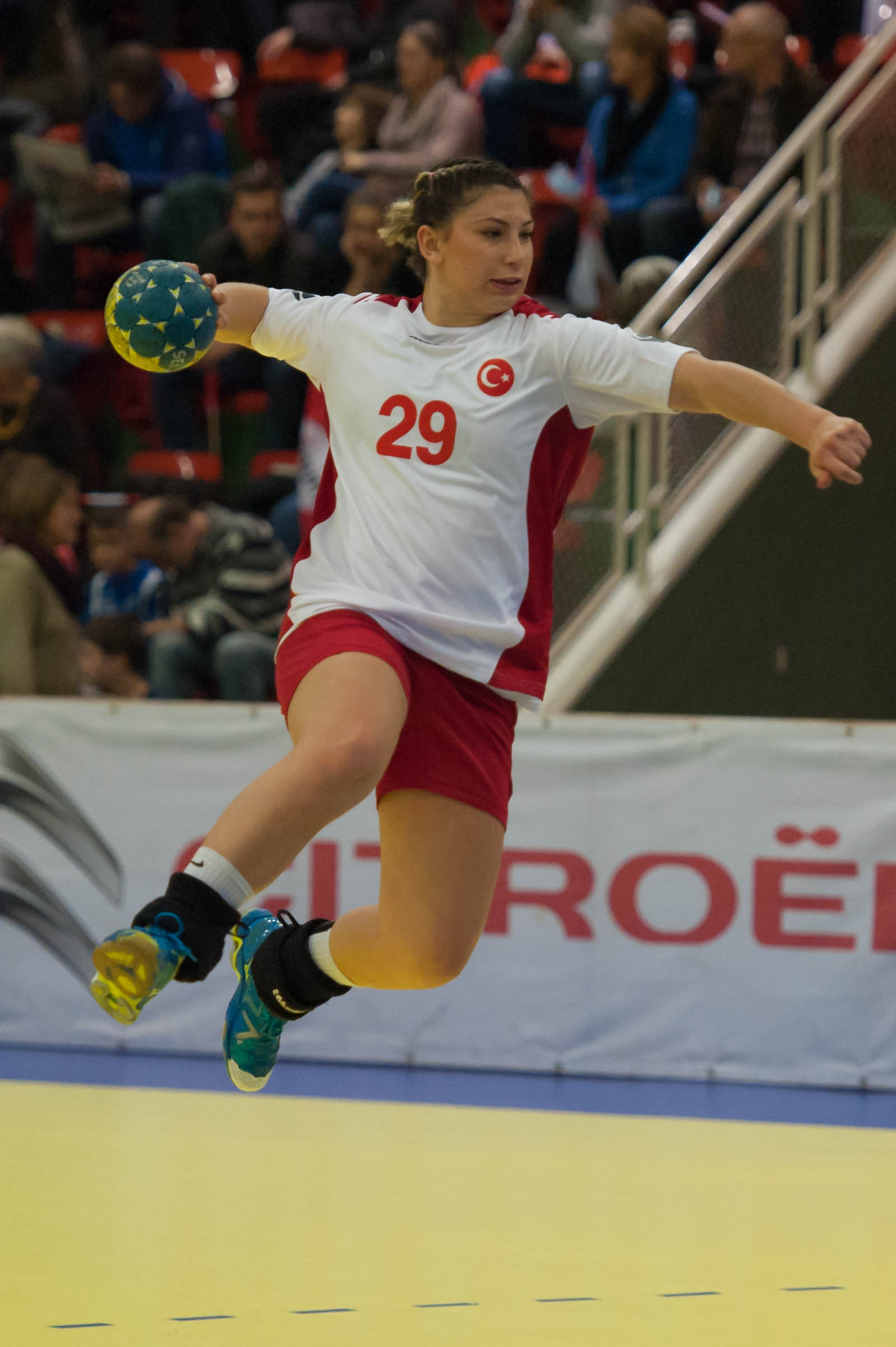
Ceren Demirçelen attacking Austria at the 2015 World Women's Handball Championship – European qualification match.

In November 2014, Demirçelen was called up to the Turkey women's national handball team. She took part in the qualification matches of the 2015 World Women's Handball Championship – European qualification. In 2022, she was part of the national team that became champions at the 5th Islamic Solidarity Games in Konya, Turkey.

She played in the national team, which won the gold medal at the 2025 Islamic Solidarity Games in Riyadh, Saudi Arabia.

== Honours ==
=== Club ===
Turkish Women's Handball Super League

- Third place (1): 2014–15.

=== International ===
Turkey women's narional handball team

Islamic Solidarity Games
Champions (2): 2021, 2025
