= Merve Erbektaş =

Turkish handball player (born 1996)

Merve Durdu Erbektaş
- Merve Durdu in 2026 for Turkey.

Personal information
- Nationality: Turkish
- Born: 15 April 1996 (age 30) Sivas, Turkey
- Height: 1.82 m (5 ft 11 1/2 in)

Sport
- Sport: Handball
- Position: Goalkeeper
- Current club: Kastamonu Bld. GSK
- Number: 58

Youth career
- Years: Team
- 2015: Üsküdar Bld. SK

Senior clubs
- Years: Team
- 2013–: Üsküdar Bld. SK
- 2018–2020: Muratpaşa Bld. SK
- 2020–: Kastamonu Bld. GSK
National team
- Years: Team
- –: Turkey
- –: Turkey beach handball
Medal record
Representing Turkey
Women's handball
Islamic Solidarity Games
Gold medal – first place	2021 Konya	Team

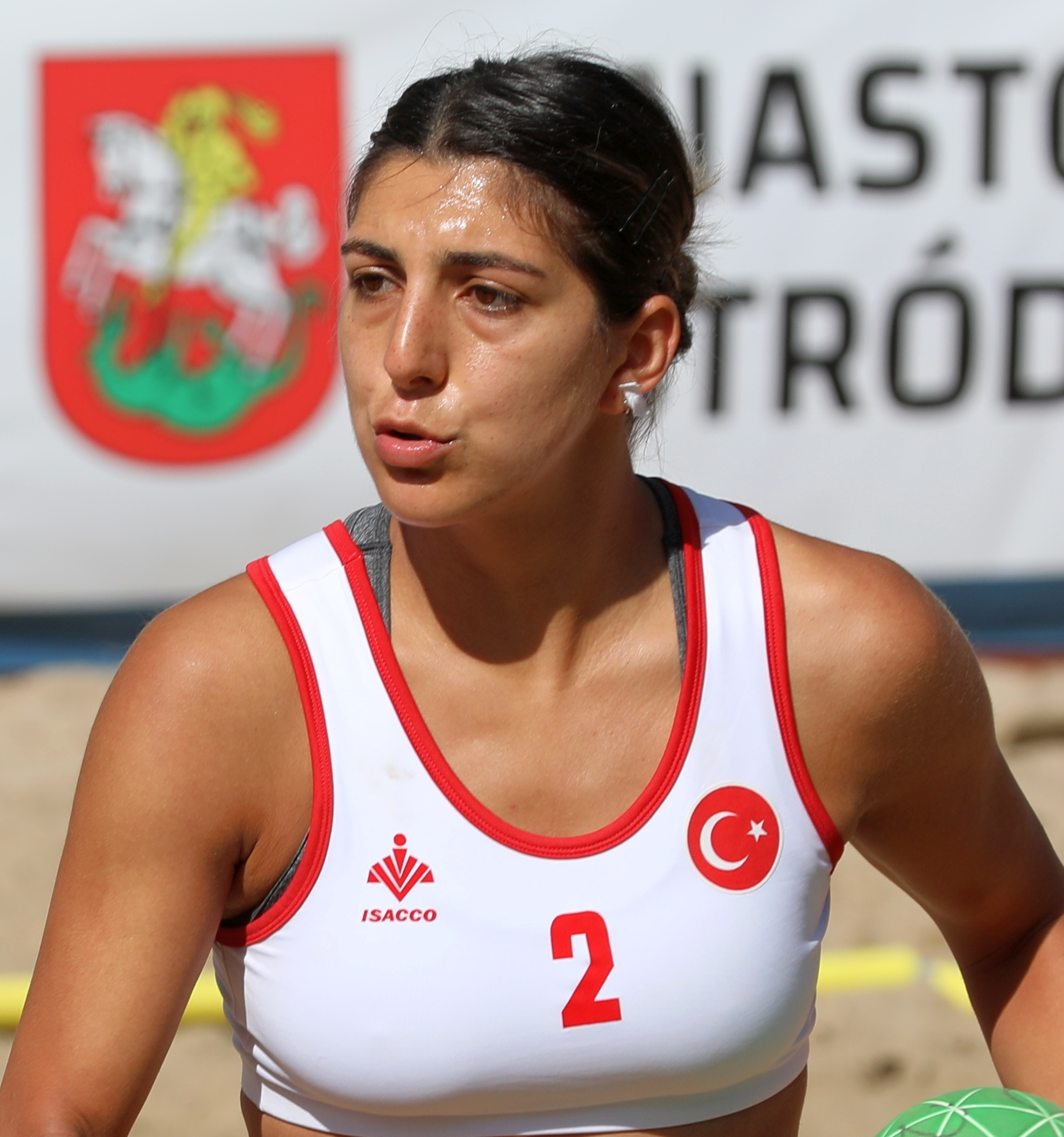
Merve Durdu playing beach handball at the 2019 European Championship

Merve Durdu Erbektaş (15 April 1996) is a Turkish handballer, who plays as goalkeeper for Kastamonu Bld. GSK in the Turkish Super League and the Turkey national team.

== Personal life ==
Merve Durdu was born in Sivas, Turkey on 15 April 1996.

== Club career ==
Durdu is 1.82 m (5 ft 11 1/2 in) tall at 70 kg (150 lb). She plays as a goalkeeper.

=== Üsküdar Belediyespor ===
She started her sports career at Üsküdar Bld. SK in Istanbul playing in the 2013–14 season of the Turkish Women's Handball Super League (Turkish: Türkiye Hentbol Kadınlar Süper Ligi). She took part in the 2013–14 Cup Winners' Cup. In 2015, she played also in the youth team, which became champion of the Turkish Handball Youth Super League (Turkish: Türkiye Gençler Süper Ligi).

=== Muratpaşa Bld. SK ===
After playing for Üsküdar Bld. SK, she moved to the Antalya-based club Muratpaşa Bld. SK (2018–2020), and played two seasons. With Muratpaşa Bld. SK, she appeared in the 2018–19 EHF Cup, 2018–19 EHF Champions League, and 2019–20 EHF Cup.

=== Kastamonu Bld. GSK ===
Late June 2020, she transferred to Kastamonu Bld. GSK. With Kastamonu Bld., she experienced two champions titles, in the 2020–21 and 2021–22 seasons.

She took part in the 2020–21 EHF European League, 2021–22 EHF Champions League, and 2022–23 EHF Champions League.

She won the 2022–23 Turkeish Super League with her team.

== International career ==
Durdu is a member of the Turkey national team. She participated at the 2022 European Women's Handball Championship qualification.

She played at the Mediterranean Games in 2018 in Tarragona, Spain, and in 2022 in Oran, Algeria. In 2022, she played in the national team, which became champion at the 5th Islamic Solidarity Games in Konya, Turkey.

Durdu is also a member of the Turkey national beach handball team. She took part at the 1st Mediterranean Beach Games in Pescara, Italy.

== Honours ==
=== Club ===
Turkish Handball Youth Super League
Üsküdar Bld. SK

Champions (1): 2015

Turkish Women's Handball Super League
Muratpaşa Bld. SK

Runners-up (1): 2018–19

Kastamonu Bld. GSK

Champions (3): 2020–21, 2021–22, 2022–23

=== International ===
Turkey women's national handball team
Islamic Solidarity Games

Champions (1): 2021
