= Jahan Musayev =

Azerbaijani Paralympic archer (1978)

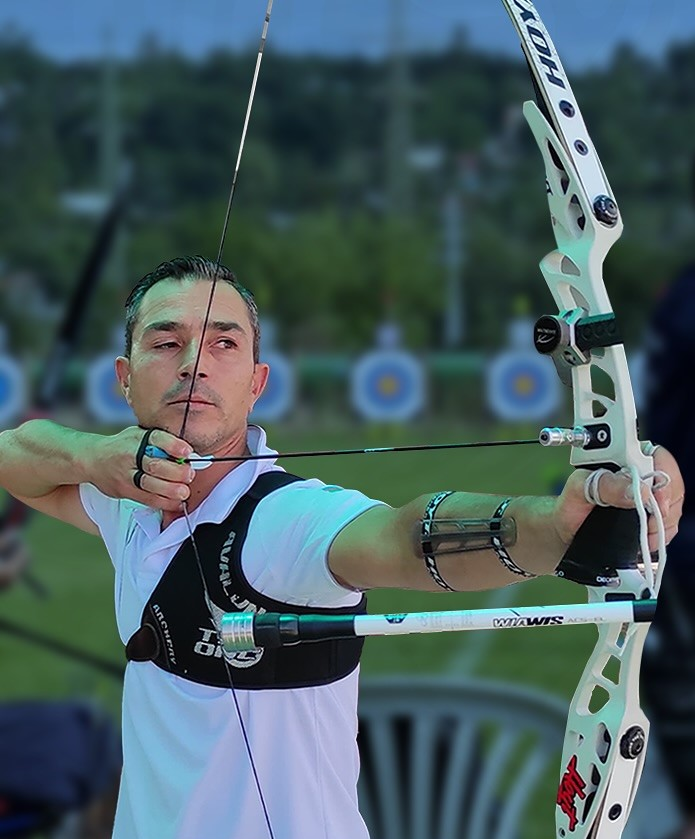

Personal information
- Native name: Cahan Musayev
- Born: 3 March 1978 (age 48)

Sport
- Sport: Archery
Medal record
Representing Azerbaijan
Islamic Solidarity Games
Bronze medal – third place	2021 Konya	Archery (Men's team)
Bronze medal – third place	2021 Konya	Archery (Mixed Team)

Jahan Musayev (Azerbaijani: Cahan Musayev; born 3 March 1978) is an Azerbaijani Paralympic archer who competes in the Men's Individual Recurve Open and Team Recurve Open events. Classified under sport class ST, he has participated in multiple international competitions, including the World Championships and European Championships. Musayev won two bronze medals at the 2021 Islamic Solidarity Games in Konya and represented Azerbaijan at the 2024 Summer Paralympic Games in Paris.

== Biography ==
Jahan Musayev was born on 3 March 1978. He pursued his education at Dokuz Eylül University in İzmir, Turkey.

Musayev began his international career in 2015 at the World Championships in Donaueschingen, Germany, where he placed 33rd in the Individual Recurve Open event. Four years later, he competed in the 2017 World Championships in Beijing, China, where he ranked 17th in the Individual Recurve Open event.

In 2019, Musayev participated in the World Championships in 's-Hertogenbosch, Netherlands, finishing 17th in both the Individual Recurve Open and Team Recurve Open events. The following year, he competed in the 2023 World Championships in Plzeň, Czech Republic, where he once again secured 17th place in both the Individual and Team Recurve Open events. Jahan Musayev won two bronze medals at the 5th Islamic Solidarity Games in Konya, Turkey, on 11 August 2021. He partnered with Azade Abdullayeva to secure third place in the mixed team event and with Ali Nabiyev in the team event.

Musayev also competed at the 2023 European Championships in Rotterdam, Netherlands, where he achieved 6th place in the Individual Recurve Open and Team Recurve Open events. Additionally, he contributed to the team securing 8th place in the Team Recurve Open event at the same competition.

Musayev competed in the 2024 Summer Paralympics, scoring 568 points in the Men's Individual Recurve event and was seeded 28th. He competed against Mohammad Reza Arab Ameri of Iran in the Round of 32, where he lost 4-6 and did not advance further in the competition.
