= Sızma =

Settlement in Turkey

- Neighbourhood
- Location in Turkey Sızma (Turkey Central Anatolia)
- Coordinates: 38°05′N 32°24′E
- Country: Turkey
- Province: Konya
- District: Selçuklu
- Elevation: 1,433 m (4,701 ft)
- Population (2022): 2,260
- Time zone: UTC+3 (TRT)
- Postal code: 42280
- Area code: 0332

Sızma is a neighbourhood of the municipality and district of Selçuklu, Konya Province, Turkey. Its population is 2,260 (2022). Before the 2013 reorganisation, it was a town (belde).

== Geography ==
Sızma is a few kilometers west of the main road connecting Konya to Afyon. The highway distance to Konya is about 25 km (16 mi).

== History ==
There are ruins of Hittites and Roman Empire in the vicinity. But the town was founded by a group of Yörüks (nomadic Oghuz Turks) in the Middle Ages. The earliest name was Sizemene; but later on, it was shortened to Sızma.

== Economy ==
There is an abandoned mercury mine in Sızma with the ore grade of 0.6 to 1% that was once a major economic activity of the town. Likewise carpet weaving is also declining. Presently, the main economic activity is agriculture (cereals) and animal husbandry.
