= Selçuklu Municipality International Sports Hall =

Indoor venue in Selçuklu, Konya, Turkey

Selçuklu Belediyesi Sport Hall Selçuklu Belediyesi Spor Salonu
- Interactive map of Selçuklu Belediyesi Sport Hall; Selçuklu Belediyesi Spor Salonu
- Location: Selçuklu, Konya, Turkey
- Coordinates: 37.9443°N 32.4894°E
- Owner: Selçuklu Municipality
- Capacity: 3,800

Construction
- Opened: 2007; 19 years ago

Tenant
- Torku Konyaspor

Selçuklu Belediyesi Sport Hall (Turkish: Selçuklu Belediyesi Spor Salonu) is a multi-purpose sport indoor venue that is located in the Selçuklu district of Konya, Turkey. The hall, with a capacity for 3,800 spectators, was built in 2007. It is home to Torku Konyaspor, which plays currently in the Turkish Basketball League.

The sports hall hosted the handball and the kickboxing competitions at the 2021 Islamic Solidarity Games.
