= Karatay Congress and Sport Center =

Indoor arena in Karatay, Konya, Turkey

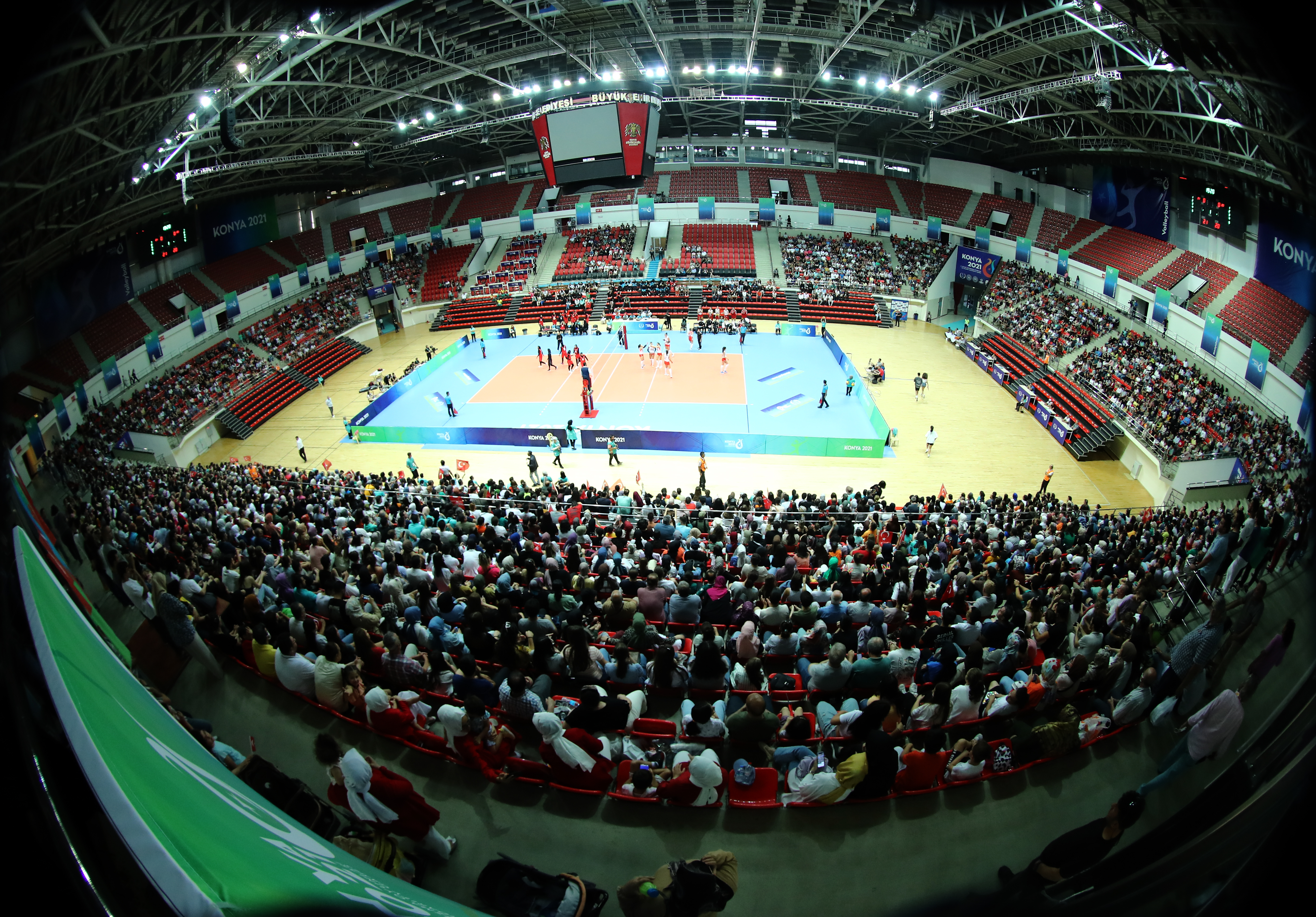
- Interactive map of Karatay Congress and Sport Center
- Location: Fetih Mah., Karatay, Konya, Turkey
- Coordinates: 37°52′17.5″N 32°31′56.8″E
- Owner: Karatay Municipality
- Capacity: 10,000

Construction
- Opened: 17 December 2013; 12 years ago

Karatay Congress and Sport Center (Turkish: Karatay Kongre ve Spor Merkezi) is a multi-sport indoor arena located in Karatay, Konya, Turkey.

The Congress and Sport Center is located in Fetih neighborhood of Karatay district in Konya. It was built by the district municipality, and was opened on 17 December 2013. Owned by the municipality, it is used mainly for volleyball events. The venue has a seating capacity of 10,000.

It hosted the volleyball and the Karate competitions of the 2021 Islamic Solidarity Games. At the court before the center, the 3x3 basketball events of the Games were held.
