= Suriname men's national 3x3 team =

National 3x3 basketball team

Suriname
- FIBA zone: FIBA Americas
- National federation: Suriname Basketball Bond

AmeriCup
- Appearances: 1

The Suriname men's national 3x3 team is a national basketball team of Suriname, administered by the Suriname Basketball Bond. It represents the country in international 3x3 (3 against 3) basketball competitions.

== AmeriCup record ==
Year	Position	Pld	W	L
(United States) 2021 Miami	did not qualify			
(United States) 2022 Miami	did not qualify			
(Puerto Rico) 2023 San Juan	did not qualify			
(Puerto Rico) 2024 San Juan	did not qualify			
(Mexico) 2025 León	did not qualify			
(El Salvador) 2026 San Salvador	11th	2	0	2
Total	1/6	2	0	2
