= Selçuklu =

District in Turkey

- District and municipality
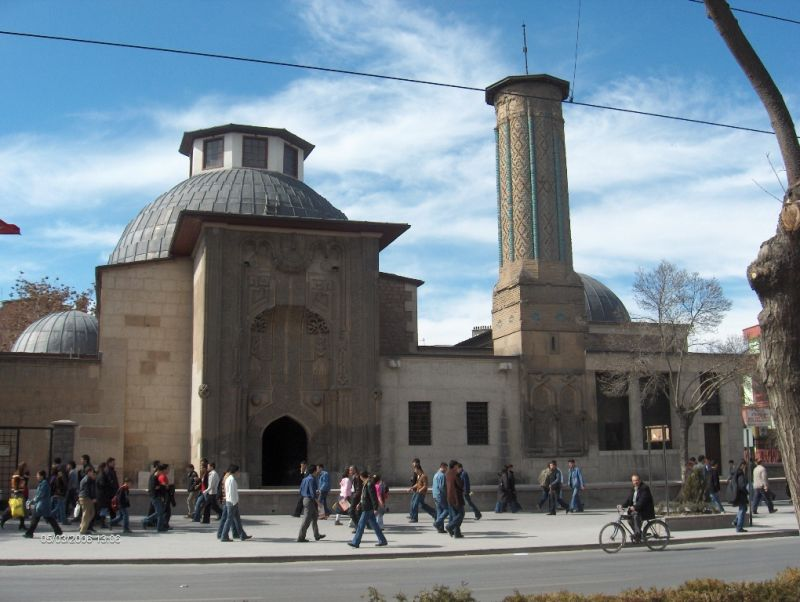
- Ince Minaret

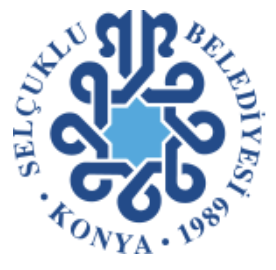
- Logo

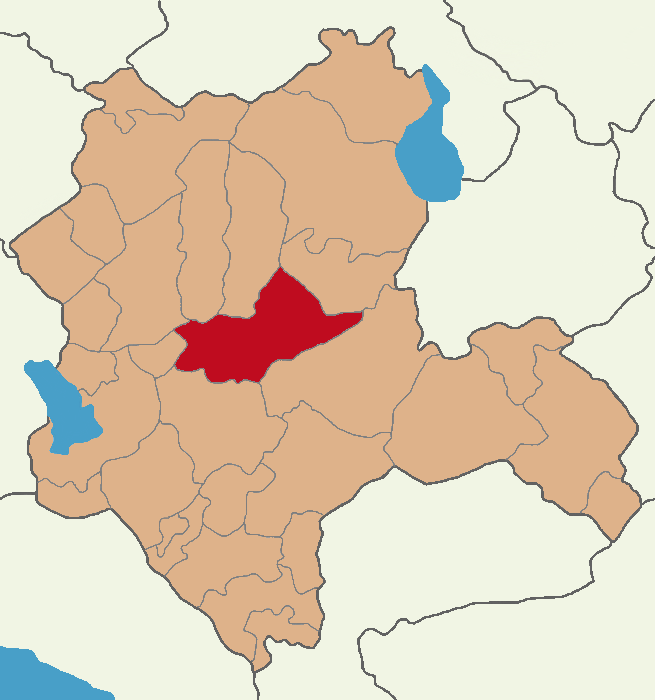
- Map showing Selçuklu District in Konya Province

- Location within Turkey Location within Turkey Central Anatolia
- Coordinates: 37°52′53″N 32°29′32″E
- Country: Turkey
- Province: Konya

Government
  - Mayor: Ahmet Pekyatırmacı (AKP)
- Area: 1,931 km^{2} (746 sq mi)
- Elevation: 1,020 m (3,350 ft)
- Population (2024): 700,358
  - Density: 362.7/km^{2} (939.4/sq mi)
- Time zone: UTC+3 (TRT)
- Area code: 0332
- Website: www.selcuklu.bel.tr

Selçuklu is a municipality and district of Konya Province, Turkey. Its area is 1,931 km^{2}, and its population is 690,667 (2022). Selçuklu is one of the central districts of Konya, along with the districts of Karatay and Meram. It covers the northwestern part of the agglomeration of Konya and the adjacent countryside.

== Flora ==
Between 2004 and 2006, a study was carried out of plants in the district in the area of the Başarakavak and Tatköy neighborhoods, and the Altınapa Dam. Two species are listed as 'Endangered' according to the IUCN Red List: Clypeola ciliata (Boiss) and Silene lycaonica (Chowdh). Also listed as 'Vulnerable' were Iris stenophylla and Centaurea bourgaei (Boiss).

== Tourism ==
The Konya Tropical Butterfly Garden, opened in 2015, is a major tourist attraction.

== Composition ==
There are 73 neighbourhoods in Selçuklu District:

- Akademi
- Akıncılar
- Akpınar
- Akşemsettin
- Ardıçlı
- Aşağıpınarbaşı-Bucak
- Aydınlıkevler
- Bağrıkurt
- Başarakavak
- Bedir
- Beyhekim
- Biçer
- Bilecik
- Binkonutlar
- Bosnahersek
- Buhara
- Büyükkayacık
- Çaldere
- Çaltı
- Çandır
- Cumhuriyet
- Dağdere
- Dokuz
- Dumlupınar
- Eğribayat
- Erenköy
- Esenler
- Fatih
- Ferhuniye
- Feritpaşa
- Güvenç
- Hacıkaymak
- Hanaybaşı
- Hocacihan
- Horozluhan
- Hüsamettinçelebi
- İhsaniye
- Işıklar
- Kaleköy
- Karaömerler
- Kervan
- Kılınçaslan
- Kınık
- Kızılcakuyu
- Kosova
- Küçükmuhsine
- Malazgirt
- Mehmet Akif
- Merkez
- Meydanköy
- Musalla Bağları
- Nişantaş
- Parsana
- Sakarya
- Sancak
- Sarayköy
- Sarıcalar
- Şeker
- Selahaddini Eyyubi
- Selahattin
- Selçuk
- Şeyhşamil
- Sille
- Sille Ak
- Sızma
- Sulutaş
- Tatköy
- Tepekent
- Tömek
- Ulumuhsine
- Yazıbelen
- Yazır
- Yukarıpınarbaşı

== International relations ==
Selçuklu is twinned with:

- Beit Hanoun, Palestine

== Gallery ==
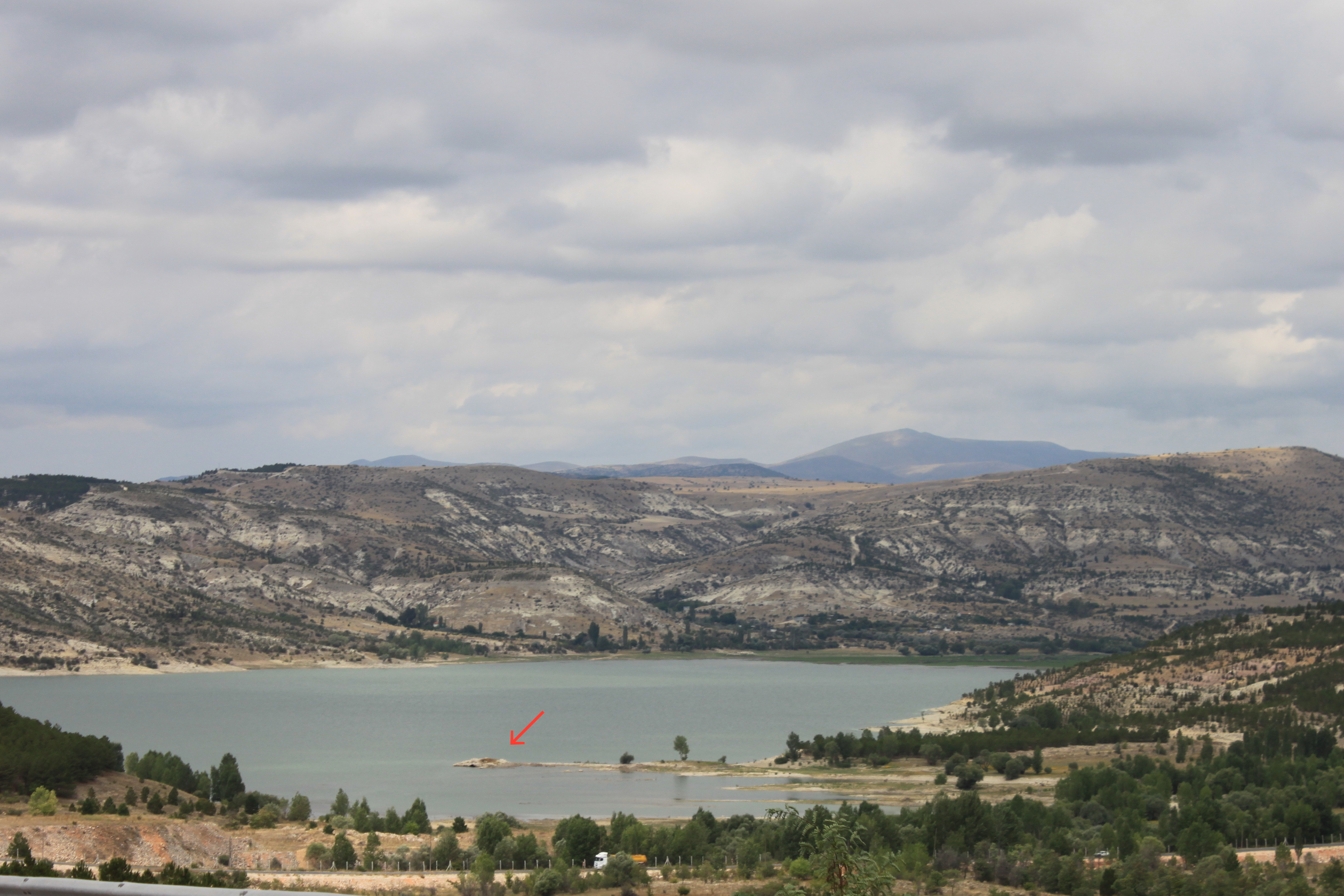
Altınapa Reservoir, western are of Selçuklu with the Altınapa Han (see red arrow)

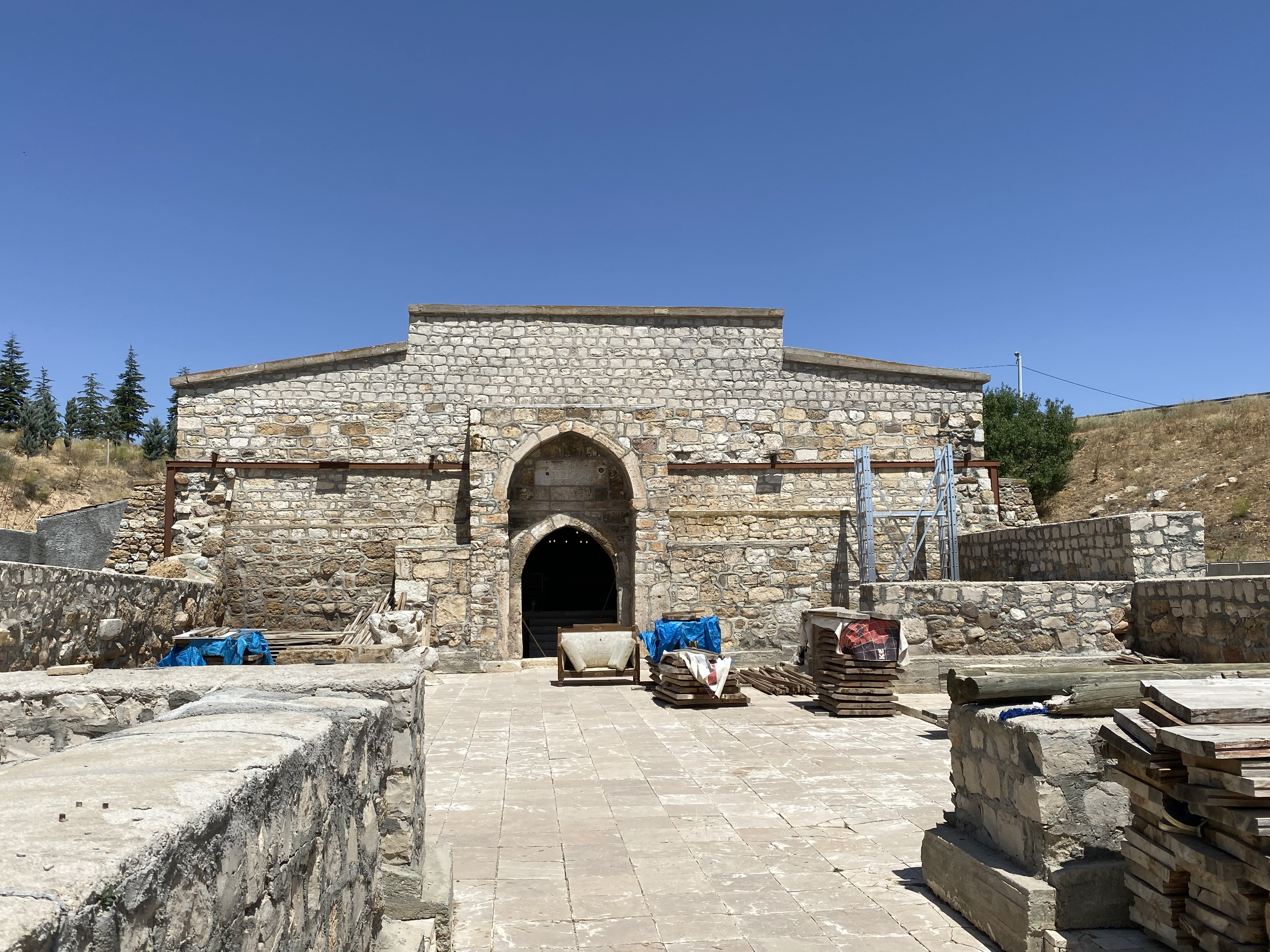
Dokuzun Hanı; view to the north

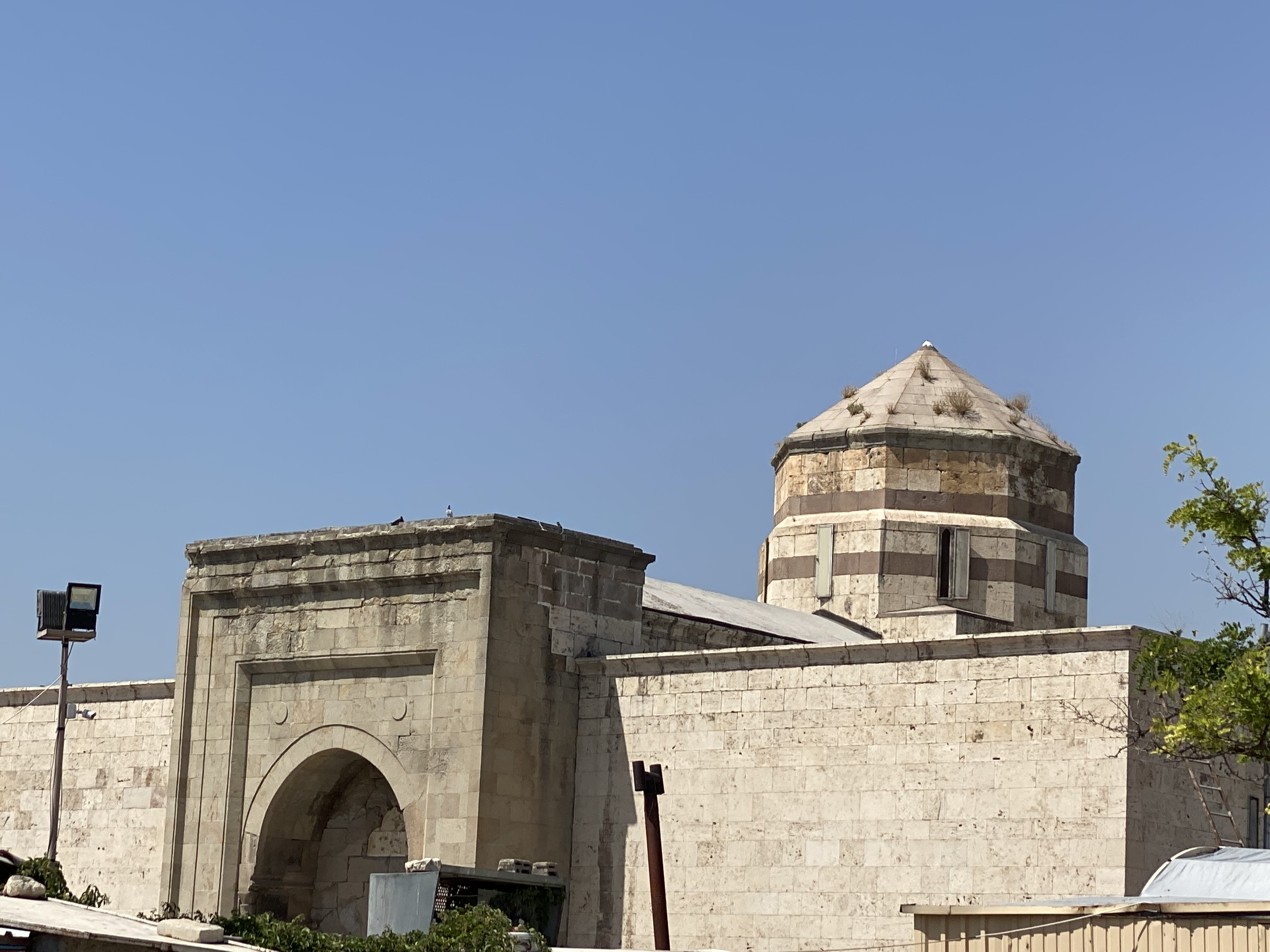
Entrance of Horuzlu Han; view from the south

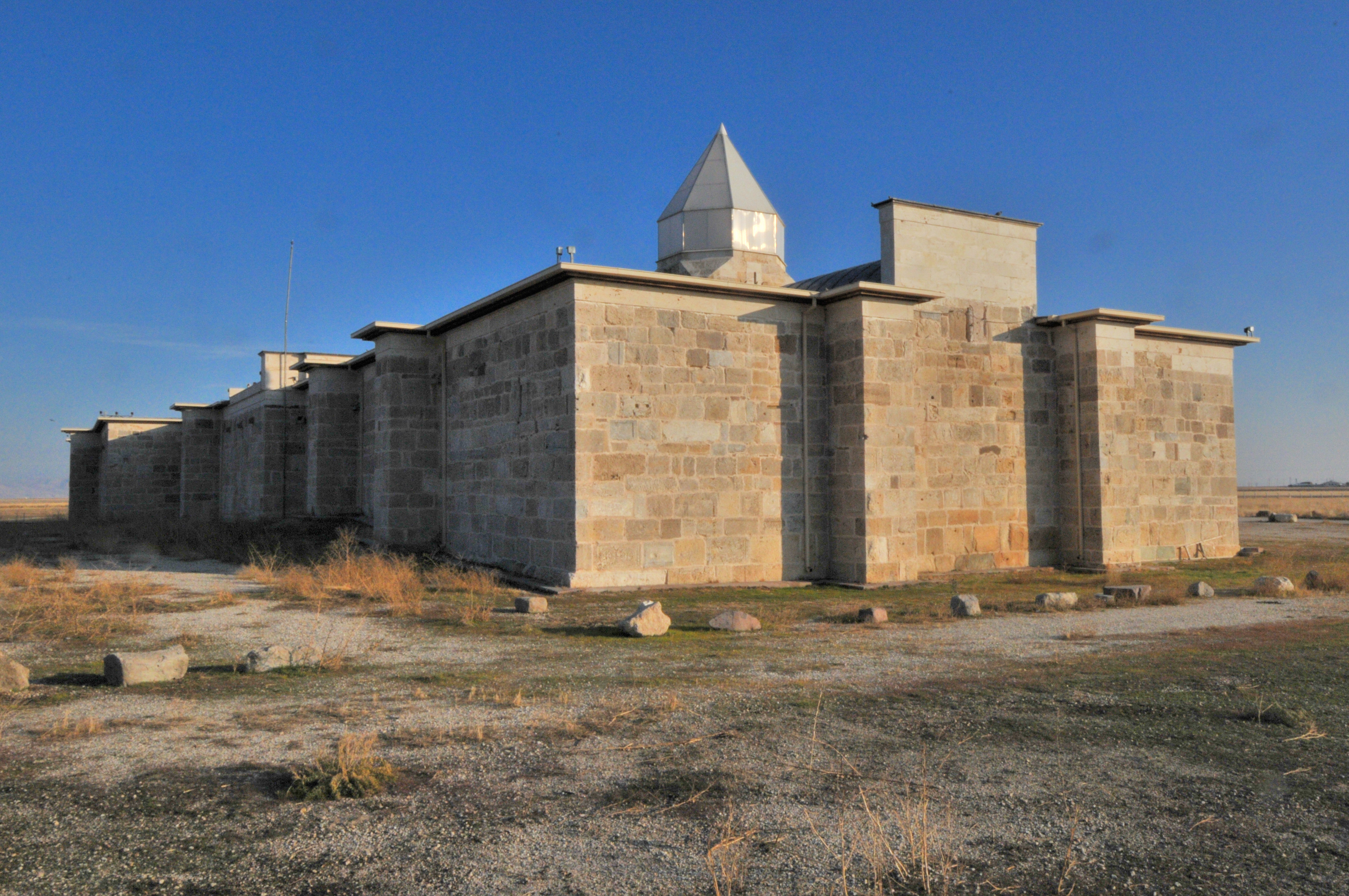
Zazadin Han near Tömek

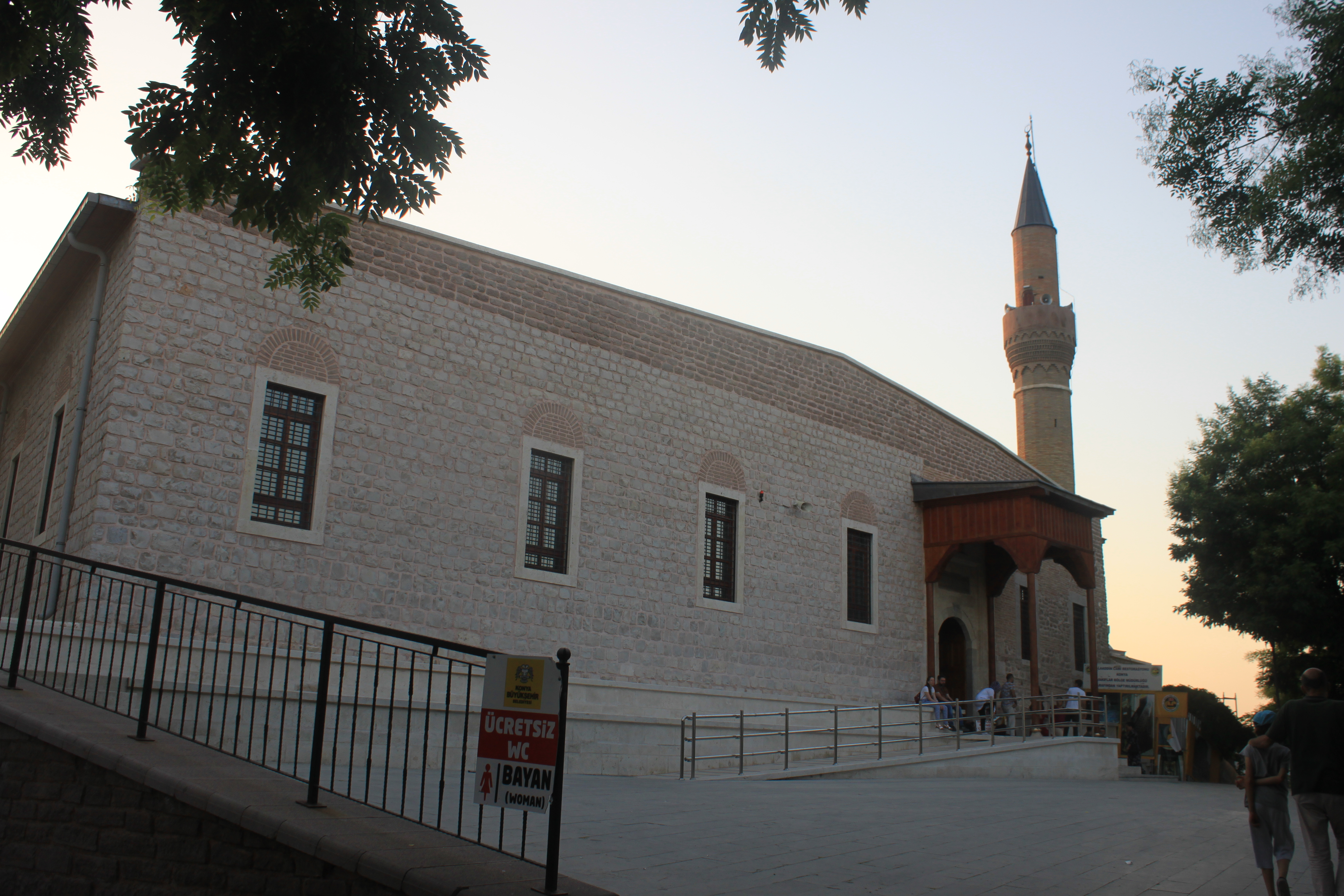
Alâeddin Mosque; built from 1155 to 1221

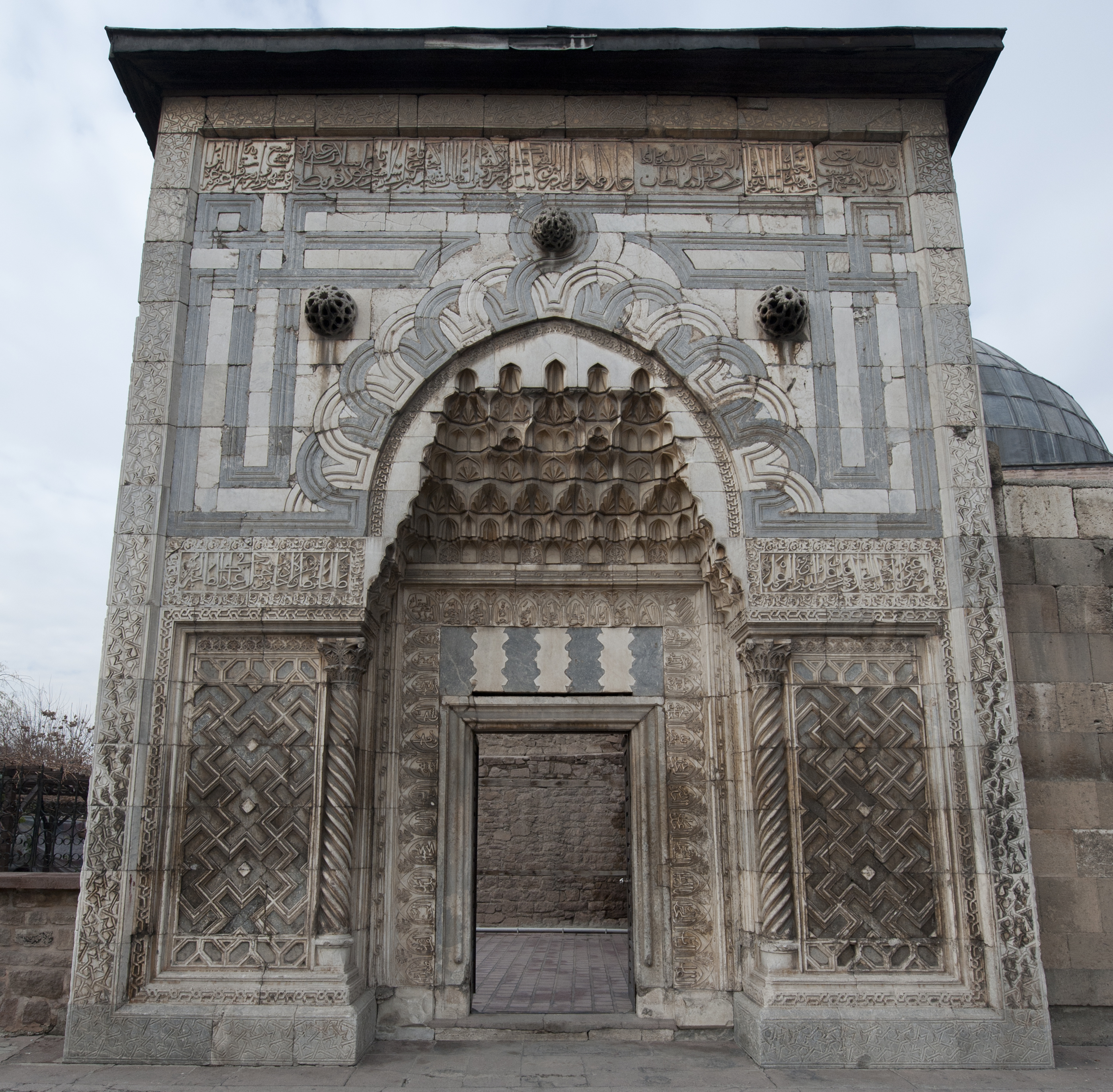
Karatay Medresesi Museum

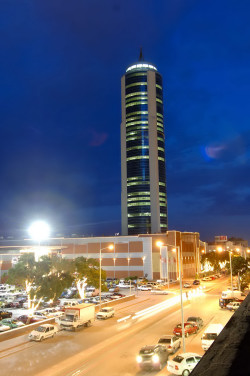
The Selçuklu Kulesi (Tower)
