= Athletics at the 2021 Islamic Solidarity Games – Results =

These are the results of the athletics competition at the 2021 Islamic Solidarity Games which took place on 8–12 August 2022 in Konya, Turkey.

== Men's results ==
=== 100 metres ===
Heats – 8 August
Wind:
Heat 1: +0.3 m/s, Heat 2: +1.3 m/s, Heat 3: +1.1 m/s, Heat 4: +4.0 m/s, Heat 5: +5.1 m/s

Rank	Heat	Name	Nationality	Time	Notes
1	4	Arthur Cissé	Ivory Coast	9.78	Q
2	5	Hassan Taftian	Iran	9.88	Q
3	3	Tosin Ogunode	Qatar	9.98	Q
4	5	Barakat Al-Harthi	Oman	9.99	Q
5	4	Imranur Rahman	Bangladesh	10.01	Q
6	2	Emre Zafer Barnes	Turkey	10.02	Q
7	5	Chakir Machmour	Morocco	10.03	Q
8	3	Baraka Abdo	Bahrain	10.04	Q
9	2	Abdullah Abkar Mohammed	Saudi Arabia	10.06	Q
9	3	Jak Ali Harvey	Turkey	10.06	Q
11	5	Muhammad Haiqal Hanafi	Malaysia	10.12	Q
12	5	Gracious Junior Ushie	Nigeria	10.13	q
13	4	Mohammadhossein Abareghi	Iran	10.25	Q
13	2	Ali Al-Balushi	Oman	10.25	Q
13	3	Shajar Abbas	Pakistan	10.25	Q
16	4	Khairul Hafiz Jantan	Malaysia	10.26	Q
17	1	Rashid Abdulraof	Bahrain	10.27	Q
18	1	Donatien Cyriaque Djero	Ivory Coast	10.29	Q
19	4	Mohammed Dawood Abdullah	Saudi Arabia	10.30	q
20	3	Kossi Medard Nayo	Togo	10.32	q
21	1	Uruemu Idjesa	Nigeria	10.39	Q
22	4	Favoris Muzrapov	Tajikistan	10.41	q
23	1	Sha Mahmood Noor Zai	Afghanistan	10.49	Q
24	2	Emmanuel Aboda	Uganda	10.50	Q
25	1	Noureddine Hadid	Lebanon	10.53	
26	5	Ibadulla Adam	Maldives	10.54	
27	2	Ildar Akhmadiev	Tajikistan	10.56	
27	3	Allan Ngobi	Uganda	10.56	
29	5	Alham Nagiyev	Azerbaijan	10.57	
30	3	Bilal Thiyab	Jordan	10.59	
31	1	Hassan Saaid	Maldives	10.60	
32	1	Moustapha Hyacinthe Traoré	Mali	10.61	
33	2	Alisher Sadulayev	Turkmenistan	10.74	
34	2	Oskar Kuchmuradov	Uzbekistan	10.76	
35	4	Matar Mabrouk	Chad	10.88	
36	3	Rashid Khalifa	Sudan	11.30	
37	4	Mohamed Aburass	Sudan	11.31	
38	2	Mohammad Sayed Sahil	Afghanistan	11.67	

Semi-finals – 9 August
Wind:
Heat 1: -0.2 m/s, Heat 2: +0.7 m/s, Heat 3: +0.1 m/s

Rank	Heat	Name	Nationality	Time	Notes
1	3	Arthur Cissé	Ivory Coast	9.91	Q
2	1	Abdullah Abkar Mohammed	Saudi Arabia	9.96	Q
3	1	Hassan Taftian	Iran	10.05	Q
4	3	Imranur Rahman	Bangladesh	10.06	Q
5	2	Baraka Abdo	Bahrain	10.09	Q
5	3	Barakat Al-Harthi	Oman	10.09	q
7	3	Jak Ali Harvey	Turkey	10.10	q
8	2	Emre Zafer Barnes	Turkey	10.11	Q
9	1	Chakir Machmour	Morocco	10.14	
10	2	Mohammed Dawood Abdullah	Saudi Arabia	10.30	
11	1	Kossi Medard Nayo	Togo	10.31	
12	1	Rashid Abdulraof	Bahrain	10.33	
13	2	Donatien Cyriaque Djero	Ivory Coast	10.36	
14	1	Ali Al-Balushi	Oman	10.37	
15	1	Shajar Abbas	Pakistan	10.38	
16	1	Gracious Junior Ushie	Nigeria	10.44	
17	2	Muhammad Haiqal Hanafi	Malaysia	10.46	
18	3	Khairul Hafiz Jantan	Malaysia	10.49	
19	2	Emmanuel Aboda	Uganda	10.57	
	2	Tosin Ogunode	Qatar	DQ	
	3	Sha Mahmood Noor Zai	Afghanistan	DQ	
	2	Uruemu Idjesa	Nigeria	DNS	
	3	Favoris Muzrapov	Tajikistan	DNS	
	3	Mohammadhossein Abareghi	Iran	DNS	

Final – 9 August
Wind: +1.7 m/s

Rank	Lane	Name	Nationality	Time	Notes
1st place, gold medalist(s)	3	Arthur Cissé	Ivory Coast	9.89	
2nd place, silver medalist(s)	5	Abdullah Abkar Mohammed	Saudi Arabia	9.95	
3rd place, bronze medalist(s)	1	Barakat Al-Harthi	Oman	9.99	
3rd place, bronze medalist(s)	7	Emre Zafer Barnes	Turkey	9.99	
5	4	Hassan Taftian	Iran	10.02	
6	8	Imranur Rahman	Bangladesh	10.17	
	7	Baraka Abdo	Bahrain	DNF	
	2	Jak Ali Harvey	Turkey	DQ	

=== 200 metres ===
Heats – 10 August
Wind:
Heat 1: -1.0 m/s, Heat 2: +0.1 m/s, Heat 3: +1.3 m/s, Heat 4: +0.6 m/s, Heat 5: +1.3 m/s, Heat 6: +1.6 m/s

Rank	Heat	Name	Nationality	Time	Notes
1	5	Emmanuel Eseme	Cameroon	20.16	Q
2	3	Chakir Machmour	Morocco	20.60	Q
3	5	Ebrahima Camara	The Gambia	20.63	Q
4	2	Ramil Guliyev	Turkey	20.67	Q
5	6	Shajar Abbas	Pakistan	20.68	q
6	4	Mohammadhossein Abareghi	Iran	20.75	Q
7	1	Hachi̇m Maaroufou	Comoros	20.79	Q
8	4	Barakat Al-Harthi	Oman	20.84	Q
9	4	Noureddi̇ne Hadid	Lebanon	20.89	Q
10	2	Yaqoob Salem Yaqoob	Bahrain	20.92	Q
11	3	Alieu Joof	The Gambia	20.94	Q
12	3	Batuhan Altıntaş	Turkey	21.02	Q
13	2	Kossi Medard Nayo	Togo	21.09	Q
14	2	Raphael Ngaguele	Cameroon	21.10	Q
15	4	Mehdi̇ Takordmioui	Morocco	21.11	Q
16	4	Emmanuel Aboda	Uganda	21.12	q
17	5	Allan Ngobi	Uganda	21.13	Q
18	3	Jonathan Nyepa	Malaysia	21.16	Q
19	3	Sha Mahmood Noor Zai	Afghanistan	21.22	q
20	3	Alham Nagiyev	Azerbaijan	21.24	q
21	6	Abdul Mueed	Pakistan	21.28	
22	6	Moustapha Traoré	Mali	21.40	
23	5	Assadi̇llah Karani Hassani	Comoros	21.68	Q
24	2	Hassan Saaid	Maldives	21.69	
25	1	Favori̇s Muzrapov	Tajikistan	21.71	Q
26	5	Ali̇sher Sadulayev	Turkmenistan	21.72	
27	1	Ibadulla Adam	Maldives	21.75	Q
28	4	Oskar Kuchmuradov	Uzbekistan	21.91	
29	2	Bi̇lal Thiyab	Jordan	22.00	
30	1	Ahmed Al-Yaari	Yemen	22.20	Q
31	1	Matar Mabrouk	Chad	22.39	
32	3	Sam Fatorma	Sierra Leone	22.41	
33	3	Alexandr Pronzhenko	Tajikistan	22.41	
34	4	Rashi̇d Khalifa	Sudan	22.71	
35	2	Mohammad Sayed Sahil	Afghanistan	23.71	
	5	Fahad Al-Subaie	Saudi Arabia	DNF	
	1	Mohammad Arsyad	Malaysia	DQ	R16.8
	1	Hassan Taftian	Iran	DQ	R16.8
	2	Mohamed Obaid Al-Saadi	Oman	DQ	R17.3.1
	1	Donati̇en Djero	Ivory Coast	DNS	
	4	Arthur Cisse	Ivory Coast	DNS	
	5	Abdo Barka	Bahrain	DNS	

Semi-finals – 11 August
Wind:
Heat 1: +3.6 m/s, Heat 2: +4.1 m/s, Heat 3: +4.2 m/s

Rank	Heat	Name	Nationality	Time	Notes
1	1	Chakir Machmour	Morocco	20.48	Q
2	2	Emmanuel Eseme	Cameroon	20.55	Q
3	3	Ramil Guliyev	Turkey	20.61	Q
4	3	Mohammadhossein Abareghi	Iran	20.74	Q
5	1	Yaqoob Salem Yaqoob	Bahrain	20.77	Q
6	1	Kossi Medard Nayo	Togo	20.77	q
7	3	Alieu Joof	The Gambia	20.78	q
8	1	Hachi̇m Maaroufou	Comoros	20.84	
9	2	Ebrahima Camara	The Gambia	20.85	Q
10	3	Shajar Abbas	Pakistan	20.85	
11	2	Allan Ngobi	Uganda	21.03	
12	3	Mehdi̇ Takordmioui	Morocco	21.05	
13	1	Noureddi̇ne Hadid	Lebanon	21.18	
14	2	Batuhan Altıntaş	Turkey	21.26	
15	3	Emmanuel Aboda	Uganda	21.29	
16	2	Alham Nagiyev	Azerbaijan	21.32	
17	2	Jonathan Nyepa	Malaysia	21.32	
18	1	Raphael Ngaguele	Cameroon	21.39	
19	3	Ibadulla Adam	Maldives	21.51	
20	1	Sha Mahmood Noor Zai	Afghanistan	21.60	
21	3	Favori̇s Muzrapov	Tajikistan	21.72	
22	1	Ahmed Al-Yaari	Yemen	22.34	
23	2	Assadi̇llah Karani Hassani	Comoros	22.34	
	2	Barakat Al-Harthi	Oman	DQ	R16.8

Final – 11 August
Wind: +3.7 m/s

Rank	Lane	Name	Nationality	Time	Notes
1st place, gold medalist(s)	5	Emmanuel Eseme	Cameroon	20.16	
2nd place, silver medalist(s)	6	Ramil Guliyev	Turkey	20.24	
3rd place, bronze medalist(s)	4	Chakir Machmour	Morocco	20.63	
4	8	Ebrahima Camara	The Gambia	20.84	
5	3	Mohammadhossein Abareghi	Iran	20.93	
6	2	Kossi Medard Nayo	Togo	20.95	
7	1	Alieu Joof	The Gambia	21.12	
8	7	Yaqoob Salem Yaqoob	Bahrain	21.17	

=== 400 metres ===
Heats – 8 August

Rank	Heat	Name	Nationality	Time	Notes
1	2	Mikhail Litvin	Kazakhstan	44.94	Q
2	2	Musa Isah	Bahrain	45.31	Q
3	2	Hamza Dair	Morocco	45.57	q
4	1	Slimane Moula	Algeria	45.59	Q
5	3	Mazen Al-Yasen	Saudi Arabia	45.94	Q
6	1	Yousef Masrahi	Saudi Arabia	45.95	Q
7	1	Frédéric Mendy	Senegal	46.04	q
8	3	Yusuf Ali Abbas	Bahrain	46.25	Q
9	2	Abdennour Bendjemaa	Algeria	46.26	
10	3	Rachi̇d M'hamdi	Morocco	46.43	
11	3	Abdul Mueed	Pakistan	47.45	
12	1	Abdulrahman Afeez Alao	Nigeria	47.92	
13	1	Andrey Sokolov	Kazakhstan	48.44	
14	2	Ahmed Al-Yaari	Yemen	48.76	
15	3	Shakhzatbek Sadykzhan	Kyrgyzstan	49.12	
16	2	Dewa Radika Syah	Indonesia	49.45	
17	2	Bangoura Naby	Guinea	52.02	
	1	Amar Ibrahim	Qatar	DQ	R16.8
	3	Mohamed Ami̇ne Touati	Tunisia	DNS	

Final – 10 August

Rank	Lane	Name	Nationality	Time	Notes
1st place, gold medalist(s)	3	Mikhail Litvin	Kazakhstan	45.36	
2nd place, silver medalist(s)	8	Yousef Masrahi	Saudi Arabia	45.80	
3rd place, bronze medalist(s)	6	Mazen Al-Yasen	Saudi Arabia	45.95	
4	4	Musa Isah	Bahrain	46.08	
5	2	Hamza Dair	Morocco	46.14	
6	1	Frédéric Mendy	Senegal	46.41	
7	7	Yusuf Ali Abbas	Bahrain	46.60	
	5	Slimane Moula	Algeria	46.60	

=== 800 metres ===
Heats – 8 August

Rank	Heat	Name	Nationality	Time	Notes
1	2	Ali Idow Hassan	Somalia	1:49.04	Q
2	2	Ebrahim Al-Zofairi	Kuwait	1:49.31	Q
3	2	Sadam Koumi	Sudan	1:49.52	q
4	2	Mohammed Al-Suleimani	Oman	1:49.73	q
5	1	Abdirahman Hassan	Qatar	1:51.34	Q
6	1	Hafid Rizqy	Morocco	1:51.37	Q
7	?	Abubaker Abdalla	Qatar	1:51.51	Q
8	1	Emmanuel Osuje	Uganda	1:51.93	
9	3	Oussama Nabil	Morocco	1:52.02	Q
10	3	Alex Orlando Macuacua	Mozambique	1:52.66	
11	1	Aden Moussa Absieh	Djibouti	1:52.67	
12	3	Musulman Dzholomanov	Kyrgyzstan	1:52.67	
13	1	Ahmed Al-Yaari	Yemen	1:53.16	
14	1	Samat Kazakbaev	Kyrgyzstan	1:56.52	
15	2	Hussai̇n Riza	Maldives	1:58.25	
16	3	Mohammed Dwedar	Palestine	1:59.47	
17	3	Maman Sani̇ Nahantchi	Niger	2:02.05	
18	3	Ekhwan Nudin	Indonesia	2:03.33	
	1	Fofana Djenab	Guinea	DNS	
	2	Ri̇adh Chninni	Tunisia	DNS	
	2	Samuel Dari̇ Bianzeuh	Chad	DNS	

Final – 10 August

Rank	Name	Nationality	Time	Notes
1st place, gold medalist(s)	Abubaker Abdalla	Qatar	1:47:59	
2nd place, silver medalist(s)	Sadam Koumi	Sudan	1:48:14	
3rd place, bronze medalist(s)	Hafid Rizqy	Morocco	1:48:22	
4	Abdirahman Hassan	Qatar	1:48:22	
5	Ebrahim Al-Zofairi	Kuwait	1:48:69	
6	Oussama Nabil	Morocco	1:49:42	
7	Ali Idow Hassan	Somalia	1:49:93	
8	Mohammed Al-Suleimani	Oman	1:50:02	

=== 1500 metres ===
Heats – 11 August

Rank	Heat	Name	Nationality	Time	Notes
1	2	Abdirahman Hassan	Qatar	3:48.34	Q
2	2	El Hassane Moujahid	Morocco	3:48.43	Q
3	2	Aden Moussa Absieh	Djibouti	3:48.50	Q
4	2	Zouhair Aouad	Bahrain	3:48.82	Q
5	2	Seyedamir Zamanpour	Iran	3:49.97	q
6	2	Shokhrukh Davlatov	Uzbekistan	3:51.10	q
7	1	Musab Adam Ali	Qatar	3:51.26	Q
8	1	Salim Keddar	Algeria	3:51.49	Q
9	1	Abdellatif Sadiki	Morocco	3:51.51	Q
10	1	Mohamed Ismail Ibrahim	Djibouti	3:51.80	Q
11	1	Abdullahi Jama Mohamed	Somalia	3:53.32	q
12	2	Yousif Musa	Sudan	3:55.21	q
13	1	Emmanuel Osuje	Uganda	3:58.81	
14	1	Evgeny Fadeev	Uzbekistan	3:59.65	
15	1	Samat Kazakbaev	Kyrgyzstan	4:02.66	
16	2	Robi Syianturi	Indonesia	4:03.10	
17	1	Alex Orlando Macuacua	Mozambique	4:03.35	
18	2	Hussain Al-Farsi	Oman	4:03.37	
19	1	Tamer Qaoud	Palestine	4:06.11	
20	2	Musulman Dzholomanov	Kyrgyzstan	4:09.48	
21	1	Samuel Dari Bianzeuh	Chad	4:20.14	
22	2	Maman Sani Nahantchi	Niger	4:24.30	
	1	Mohammed Al-Suleimani	Oman	DNS	

Final – 12 August

Rank	Name	Nationality	Time	Notes
1st place, gold medalist(s)	Abdellatif Sadiki	Morocco	3:54.40	
2nd place, silver medalist(s)	Abdirahman Hassan	Qatar	3:54.46	
3rd place, bronze medalist(s)	Salim Keddar	Algeria	3:54.72	
4	El Hassane Moujahid	Morocco	3:55.53	
5	Musab Adam Ali	Qatar	3:56.33	
6	Zouhair Aouad	Bahrain	3:57.08	
7	Aden Moussa Absieh	Djibouti	3:58.02	
8	Shokhrukh Davlatov	Uzbekistan	4:00.86	
9	Seyedamir Zamanpour	Iran	4:02.44	
10	Abdullahi Jama Mohamed	Somalia	4:05.59	
	Mohamed Ismail Ibrahim	Djibouti	DNF	
	Yousif Musa	Sudan	DNS	

=== 5000 metres ===
8 August

Rank	Name	Nationality	Time	Notes
1st place, gold medalist(s)	Birhanu Balew	Bahrain	13:51.64	
2nd place, silver medalist(s)	Mohamed Fares	Morocco	13:54.02	
3rd place, bronze medalist(s)	Abel Chebet	Uganda	13:54.93	
4	Aras Kaya	Turkey	13:56.90	
5	Soufiyan Bouqantar	Morocco	13:57.41	
6	Tariq Al-Amri	Saudi Arabia	13:59.59	
7	Albert Rop	Bahrain	14:02.09	
8	Sougueh Aden Houssein	Djibouti	14:35.94	
9	Seyedamir Zamanpour	Iran	14:49.21	
10	Nursultan Keneshbekov	Kyrgyzstan	14:50.10	
11	Yevgeniy Fadeyev	Uzbekistan	14:51.45	
12	Tamer Qaoud	Palestine	16:27.36	
	Mohamad Al-Garni	Qatar	DNF	
	Abdullahi Jama Mohamed	Somalia	DNF	
	Yousif Musa	Sudan	DNF	
	Youssouf Hiss Bachir	Djibouti	DQ	R17.6
	Ali Hisseine Mahamat	Chad	DNS	

=== 10,000 metres ===
10 August

Rank	Name	Nationality	Time	Notes
1st place, gold medalist(s)	Dawit Admasu	Bahrain	28:31.14	
2nd place, silver medalist(s)	Abel Chebet	Uganda	28:31.39	
3rd place, bronze medalist(s)	Bouh Guelleh Moumin	Djibouti	28:33.01	
4	Aras Kaya	Turkey	28:34.71	
5	Albert Rop	Bahrain	28:45.66	
6	Hassan Toriss	Morocco	29:14.02	
7	Mohcin Outalha	Morocco	29:34.20	
8	Sougueh Aden Houssein	Djibouti	30:12.51	
9	Shokhrukh Davlatov	Uzbekistan	30:22.20	
10	Nursultan Keneshbekov	Kyrgyzstan	31:22.06	
11	Abdi Dawidh Rhoble	Somalia	31:39.34	
12	Ilia Tiapkin	Kyrgyzstan	31:49.83	
13	Nofeldi Petingko	Indonesia	33:21.40	
14	Valentin Betoudji	Chad	33:29.07	
	Tariq Al-Amri	Saudi Arabia	DNF	

=== 110 metres hurdles ===
Heats – 9 August
Wind:
Heat 1: +1.4 m/s, Heat 2: +0.3 m/s

Rank	Heat	Name	Nationality	Time	Notes
1	1	Yaqoub Al-Youha	Kuwait	13.36	Q
2	2	Amine Bouanani	Algeria	13.40	Q
3	2	Louis François Mendy	Senegal	13.43	Q
4	1	Mikdat Sevler	Turkey	13.56	Q
5	1	Saeed Al-Absi	Qatar	13.66	Q
5	2	David Yefremov	Kazakhstan	13.66	Q
7	1	Ergash Normuradov	Uzbekistan	13.78	q
8	1	Masoud Kamran	Iran	13.81	q
9	1	Jori̇m Lénoard Bangué	Cameroon	14.12	
10	2	Oumar Doudai Abakar	Qatar	14.66	
11	2	Leoni̇d Pronzhenko	Tajikistan	15.19	

Final – 10 August

Wind: +2.1 m/s

Rank	Lane	Name	Nationality	Time	Notes
1st place, gold medalist(s)	5	Amine Bouanani	Algeria	13.21	
2nd place, silver medalist(s)	3	Louis François Mendy	Senegal	13.28	
3rd place, bronze medalist(s)	4	Yaqoub Al-Youha	Kuwait	13.30	
4	7	David Yefremov	Kazakhstan	13.64	
5	1	Masoud Kamran	Iran	13.74	
6	8	Saeed Al-Absi	Qatar	13.76	
7	2	Ergash Normuradov	Uzbekistan	13.78	
	6	Mikdat Sevler	Turkey	DNF	

=== 400 metres hurdles ===
Heats – 8 August

Rank	Heat	Name	Nationality	Time	Notes
1	1	Bassem Hemeida	Qatar	49.68	Q
2	2	Yasmani Copello	Turkey	49.87	Q
3	2	Saad Hinti	Morocco	50.03	Q
4	2	Mahdi Pirjahan	Iran	50.58	Q
5	2	Saber Boukmouche	Algeria	50.60	q
6	1	Abdelmalik Lahoulou	Algeria	50.79	Q
7	1	Mohammed Al-Muawi	Saudi Arabia	50.84	Q
8	2	Vyacheslav Zems	Kazakhstan	51.54	q
9	1	Ahmad Saeed	Pakistan	52.06	
10	1	Ousmane Sidibé	Senegal	52.11	
11	2	Halomoan Edwi̇n Binsar	Indonesia	52.17	
12	2	Leoni̇d Pronzhenko	Tajikistan	54.60	
	1	Si̇nan Ören	Turkey	DNF	

Final – 9 August

Rank	Lane	Name	Nationality	Time	Notes
1st place, gold medalist(s)	5	Bassem Hemeida	Qatar	48.67	
2nd place, silver medalist(s)	3	Yasmani Copello	Turkey	48.86	
3rd place, bronze medalist(s)	6	Abdelmalik Lahoulou	Algeria	49.15	
4	8	Mahdi Pirjahan	Iran	49.35	
5	7	Saber Boukmouche	Algeria	49.74	
6	4	Saad Hinti	Morocco	50.28	
7	1	Mohammed Al-Muawi	Saudi Arabia	50.32	
8	2	Vyacheslav Zems	Kazakhstan	51.67	

=== 3000 metres steeplechase ===
10 August

Rank	Name	Nationality	Time	Notes
1st place, gold medalist(s)	Abderrafia Bouassel	Morocco	8:57:92	
2nd place, silver medalist(s)	Mohamed Ismail Ibrahim	Djibouti	8:58:92	
3rd place, bronze medalist(s)	Musab Adam Ali	Qatar	9:02:53	
4	John Kibet Koech	Bahrain	9:19:64	
5	Gamil Al-Hamati	Yemen	10:26:49	
	Mohamed Tindouft	Morocco	DNF	

=== 4 × 100 metres relay ===
Heats – 11 August

Rank	Heat	Nation	Competitors	Time	Notes
1	2	Turkey	Emre Zafer Barnes, Jak Ali Harvey, Kayhan Özer, Ertan Özkan	39.54	Q
2	1	Bahrain	Ebrahim Simon Omar, Rashid Abdulraof, Yaqoob Salem Yaqoob, Saeed Al-Khardi	39.66	Q
3	1	Oman	Alsaih Amman, Barakat Al-Harthi, Mohamed Obaid Al-Saadi, Ali̇ Al-Balushi	39.75	Q
4	1	Malaysia	Jonathan Nyepa, Mohammad Arsyad, Mohammad Haiqal Hanafi, Khairul Hafiz Jantan	39.90	Q
5	2	Gambia	Sencan Jobe, Ali̇eu Joof, Ebrahima Camara, Adama Jammeh	40.02	Q, NR
6	2	Saudi Arabia	Mohammed Dawood Abdullah, Fahad Al-Subaie, Ahmed Al-Marwani, Abdullah Abkar Mohammed	40.12	Q
7	1	Cameroon	Ibrahi̇ma Hamayadji, Linda Nganguele, Tetnap Nsangou, Appolinaire Yinra	40.56	q
8	1	Qatar	Saeed Al-Absi, Oumar Abakar, Saed Al-Sahati, Tosin Ogunode	41.15	q
9	2	Maldives	Momamed Minhal Shamin, Ibrahim Naahil Nizar, Ibadulla Adam, Hussain Zeek Suad	42.64	
10	2	Tajikistan	Ildar Akhmadiev, Alexandr Pronzhenko, Sali̇m Saidaliev, Leoni̇d Pronzhenko	42.71	

Final – 12 August

Rank	Lane	Nation	Competitors	Time	Notes
1st place, gold medalist(s)	6	Turkey	Emre Zafer Barnes, Jak Ali Harvey, Kayhan Özer, Ramil Guliyev	38.74	GR
2nd place, silver medalist(s)	5	Bahrain	Ebrahim Simon Omar, Rashid Abdulraof, Yaqoob Salem Yaqoob, Saeed Al-Khardi	39.01	NR
3rd place, bronze medalist(s)	3	Oman	Alsaih Amman, Barakat Al-Harthi, Mohamed Obaid Al-Saadi, Ali̇ Al-Balushi	39.21	NR
4	4	Gambia	Sencan Jobe, Ali̇eu Joof, Ebrahima Camara, Adama Jammeh	39.27	NR
5	8	Saudi Arabia	Mohammed Dawood Abdullah, Fahad Al-Subaie, Hamoud Olwani, Abdullah Abkar Mohammed	39.32	
6	7	Malaysia	Jonathan Nyepa, Mohammad Arsyad, Mohammad Haiqal Hanafi, Khairul Hafiz Jantan	39.46	
7	1	Cameroon	Ibrahi̇ma Hamayadji, Raphael Nganguele, Tetnap Nsangou, Emmanuel Eseme	39.51	
8	2	Qatar	Saeed Al-Absi, Oumar Abakar, Saed Al-Sahati, Tosin Ogunode	40.36	

=== 4 × 400 metres relay ===
12 August

Rank	Lane	Nation	Competitors	Time	Notes
1st place, gold medalist(s)	4	Morocco	Aymane El Haddaoui, Rachi̇d M'hamdi, Saad Hinti, Hamza Dair	3:03.76	
2nd place, silver medalist(s)	1	Algeria	Miloud Laredj, Es Saddik Hammouni Anas, Abdennour Bendjemaa, Abdelmalik Lahoulou	3:04.52	
3rd place, bronze medalist(s)	6	Bahrain	Ali Khamis, Hussain Al-Dosari, Yusuf Ali Abbas, Musa Isah	3:04.79	
4	5	Senegal	Ousmane Sidibé, El Hadji Nalick Coubaly, Joseph Amicha Coulibaly, Frédéric Mendy	3:07.32	
5	3	Kazakhstan	Vyacheslav Zems, Andrey Sokolov, David Yefremov, Mikhail Litvin	3:10.63	
	8	Turkey	Oğuzhan Kaya, Jak Ali Harvey, Batuhan Altıntaş, İsmai̇l Nezi̇r	DQ	R17.4.3
	2	Qatar	Ismail Doydai Abakar, Abubaker Abdalla, Amar Ibrahim, Bassem Hemida	DQ	R24.19
	7	Saudi Arabia	Mazen Al-Yasen, Mohammed Al-Muawi, Ibrahim Futayni, Yousef Masrahi	DQ	R24.19

=== High jump ===
12 August

Rank	Name	Nationality	1.94	1.99	2.04	2.09	2.14	2.18	Result	Notes
1st place, gold medalist(s)	Hamdi Ali	Qatar	–	o	o	o	o	xxx	2.14	
1st place, gold medalist(s)	Fatak Bait Jaboob	Oman	–	o	o	o	o	xxx	2.14	NR
3rd place, bronze medalist(s)	Mohamad Eizlan Dahalan	Malaysia	–	–	o	o	xo	xxx	2.14	
4	Sharoz Khan	Pakistan	o	o	o	xo	xo	xxx	2.14	NR
5	Afer Bilel	Algeria	–	o	o	o	xxx		2.09	
6	Khaled Al-Mesaad	Kuwait	–	xo	o	o	xxx		2.09	
7	Salim Saidaliev	Tajikistan	xo	o	o	xxx			2.04	

=== Pole vault ===
9 August

Rank	Name	Nationality	4.20	4.40	4.60	4.80	5.00	5.20	5.40	5.60	5.70	5.81	Result	Notes
1st place, gold medalist(s)	Ersu Şaşma	Turkey	–	–	–	–	–	–	o	o	–	xxx	5.60	
2nd place, silver medalist(s)	Hussain Al-Hizam	Saudi Arabia	–	–	–	–	–	o	o	x–	xx		5.40	
3rd place, bronze medalist(s)	Majed Radhi Al-Sayed	Kuwait	o	o	xo	o	xxr						4.80	
	Hichem Cherabi	Algeria	–	–	–	–	xxx						NM	
	Ali Al-Sabaghah	Kuwait	–	xxx									NM	

=== Long jump ===
12 August

Rank	Name	Nationality	#1	#2	#3	#4	#5	#6	Result	Notes
1st place, gold medalist(s)	Anvar Anvarov	Uzbekistan	7.55w	x	x	7.93w	8.01	3.10	8.01	
2nd place, silver medalist(s)	Ildar Akhmadiev	Tajikistan	x	7.86	x	7.69	x	x	7.86	
3rd place, bronze medalist(s)	Necati Er	Turkey	7.83w	x	x	x	–	x	7.83w	
4	Hamoud Olwani	Saudi Arabia	7.80	7.66	–	7.19w	x	7.68w	7.80	
5	Amath Faye	Senegal	7.20	7.80w	x	7.19	7.64	x	7.80w	
6	Appolinare Yinra	Cameroon	7.77w	x	x	7.67	7.35	7.59	7.77w	
7	Salim Al-Yarabi	Oman	7.57	x	x	7.06	7.13	x	7.57	
8	Mouhcine Khoua	Morocco	x	7.49	x	x	x	x	7.49	
9	Muammer Demir	Turkey	x	7.37	7.37				7.37	
10	Javokhir Noriev	Uzbekistan	7.31	7.28	7.32				7.32	
11	Nazim Babayev	Azerbaijan	x	7.15	7.14				7.15	
12	Ibrahim Naahil Nizaar	Maldives	6.88w	6.15	6.71				6.88w	
13	Timur Isakov	Kyrgyzstan	x	6.71	x				6.71	
	Sam Fatorma	Sierra Leone							DNS	

=== Triple jump ===
9 August

Rank	Name	Nationality	#1	#2	#3	#4	#5	#6	Result	Notes
1st place, gold medalist(s)	Necati Er	Turkey	16.32	16.64	16.73	–	–	r	16.73	
2nd place, silver medalist(s)	Alexis Copello	Azerbaijan	16.03	x	16.10	16.40	x	16.23	16.40	
3rd place, bronze medalist(s)	Amath Faye	Senegal	16.16	x	x	x	16.07	16.02w	16.16	
4	Hamidreza Kia	Iran	16.07	15.82	16.06	16.02	x	15.96	16.07	
5	Nazim Babayev	Azerbaijan	x	15.90	13.69	16.06	x	x	16.06	
6	Hassan Nasser Darwish	Saudi Arabia	15.35	14.90	15.77	15.57	15.90	x	15.90	
7	Salim Al-Rawahi	Oman	x	15.72	x	13.62	15.09	15.36	15.72	NR
8	Salim Saidaliev	Tajikistan	x	x	x	13.53	r		13.53	
	Salim Al-Yarabi	Oman							DNS	

=== Shot put ===
8 August

Rank	Name	Nationality	#1	#2	#3	#4	#5	#6	Result	Notes
1st place, gold medalist(s)	Alperen Karahan	Turkey	x	18.84	20.46	x	19.52	x	20.46	
2nd place, silver medalist(s)	Mohammed Tolo	Saudi Arabia	19.12	19.24	18.95	19.51	19.64	20.12	20.12	
3rd place, bronze medalist(s)	Abdelrahman Mahmoud	Bahrain	18.01	x	17.78	18.19	19.44	x	19.44	
4	Morteza Nazemi	Iran	18.80	18.91	18.51	18.56	18.98	18.66	18.98	
5	Mashari Mohammad	Kuwait	18.82	x	x	18.26	x	x	18.82	
6	Mehdi Saberi	Iran	x	18.69	x	x	x	x	18.69	
7	Ebrahim Al-Fadhli	Kuwait	x	16.85	17.75	x	x	x	17.75	
8	Musab Momani	Jordan	16.62	17.48	x	17.06	17.31	x	17.48	
9	Doston Rajabov	Uzbekistan	17.06	x	x				17.06	
10	Jamshaid Ali	Pakistan	16.65	16.28	x				16.65	
11	Pallees Janique	Suriname	x	16.01	x				16.01	

=== Discus throw ===
11 August

Rank	Name	Nationality	#1	#2	#3	#4	#5	#6	Result	Notes
1st place, gold medalist(s)	Essa Al-Zenkawi	Kuwait	58.74	58.55	62.03	61.40	60.73	61.54	62.03	
2nd place, silver medalist(s)	Moaaz Mohamed Ibrahim	Qatar	60.97	61.00	x	59.50	x	61.35	61.35	
3rd place, bronze medalist(s)	Oussama Khennoussi	Algeria	x	53.84	55.45	56.63	60.59	x	60.59	NR
4	Ömer Şahin	Turkey	58.00	56.64	55.16	60.02	58.30	x	60.02	
5	Ehsan Haddadi	Iran	56.28	x	59.81	59.33	x	59.13	59.81	
6	Irfan Shamsuddin	Malaysia	59.37	x	59.17	x	57.71	x	59.37	
7	Musaeb Al-Momani	Jordan	56.41	52.52	x	x	55.13	55.83	56.41	
8	Rashidbek Sodikov	Uzbekistan	50.45	55.24	42.23	x	54.27	x	55.24	
9	Hossein Rasouli	Iran	x	54.83	x				54.83	
10	Ivan Marekelov	Uzbekistan	51.72	x	x				51.72	

=== Hammer throw ===
11 August

Rank	Name	Nationality	#1	#2	#3	#4	#5	#6	Result	Notes
1st place, gold medalist(s)	Sukhrob Khodjaev	Uzbekistan	68.81	67.55	70.90	69.64	71.87	70.07	71.87	
2nd place, silver medalist(s)	Eşref Apak	Turkey	71.34	69.76	68.77	–	69.11	68.05	71.34	
3rd place, bronze medalist(s)	Özkan Baltacı	Turkey	66.88	x	68.90	x	x	x	68.90	
4	Mergen Mämmedow	Turkmenistan	68.40	x	67.27	64.96	65.70	64.27	68.40	
5	Ashraf Amgad El-Seify	Qatar	67.19	65.49	67.90	x	68.14	x	68.14	
6	Ali Al-Zenkawi	Kuwait	63.54	x	x	62.47	66.98	x	66.98	
7	Mahmoud El Gohary	Bahrain	64.37	62.69	62.98	x	x	64.64	64.64	
8	Mohammed Al-Dubaisi	Saudi Arabia	58.68	61.48	62.26	61.98	62.30	62.21	62.30	
9	Sadat Marzuqi	Malaysia	59.05	x	59.02				59.05	
10	Mubeen Al-Kindi	Oman	x	56.11	57.26				57.26	
	Reza Moghaddam Kordmahalleh	Iran	x	x	x				NM	

=== Javelin throw ===
12 August

Rank	Name	Nationality	#1	#2	#3	#4	#5	#6	Result	Notes
1st place, gold medalist(s)	Arshad Nadeem	Pakistan	x	79.40	88.55	75.50	82.40	83.33	88.55	GR
2nd place, silver medalist(s)	Ahmed Magour	Qatar	x	74.28	73.89	x	x	r	74.28	
3rd place, bronze medalist(s)	Ali Fathi Ganji	Iran	61.06	x	67.38	63.67	63.27	71.42	71.42	
4	Abdulrahman Al-Azemi	Kuwait	61.51	64.72	64.35	65.64	68.41	x	68.41	
5	Abdul Hafiz	Indonesia	x	62.02	x	x	x	61.09	62.02	

== Women's results ==
=== 100 metres ===
Heats – 8 August
Wind:
Heat 1: +2.4 m/s, Heat 2: +2.8 m/s, Heat 3: +3.5 m/s, Heat 4: +3.9 m/s

Rank	Heat	Name	Nationality	Time	Notes
1	4	Edidiong Odiong	Bahrain	10.96	Q
2	4	Maboundou Koné	Ivory Coast	11.05	Q
3	2	Hajar Al-Khaldi	Bahrain	11.15	Q
4	2	Hajar Eddaou	Morocco	11.23	Q
5	1	Farzaneh Fasihi	Iran	11.24	Q
6	1	Elif Polat	Turkey	11.30	Q
7	1	Olga Safronova	Kazakhstan	11.33	Q
8	1	Iyanuoluwa Toyin Bada	Nigeria	11.37	q
9	3	Simay Özçiftçi	Turkey	11.40	Q
10	3	Balikis Temitope Yakubu	Nigeria	11.43	Q
11	3	Madina Touré	Burkina Faso	11.45	Q
12	2	Akouvi Judith Koumedzina	Togo	11.57	Q
12	3	Mazoon Al-Alawi	Oman	11.57	q
14	2	Valentina Meredova	Turkmenistan	11.59	q
15	4	Mudhawi Al-Shammari	Kuwait	11.60	Q
16	4	Laylo Allaberganova	Uzbekistan	11.80	q
17	4	Evaline Ocen Koli	Uganda	11.80	
18	1	Ancha Ernesto Mandlate	Mozambique	11.95	
19	3	Aliya Boshnak	Jordan	12.01	
20	2	Elisa Myrtollari	Albania	12.20	
21	1	Arooj Kiran	Pakistan	12.24	
22	3	Mariyam Alhaa Hussain	Maldives	12.28	
23	2	Ousmane Housna	Chad	12.52	
24	4	Yasmeen Al-Dabbagh	Saudi Arabia	12.81	
25	4	Ousmane Hassanie	Chad	12.84	
26	2	Dima Daralsheikh	Palestine	12.99	

Semi-finals – 9 August
Wind:
Heat 1: -0.8 m/s, Heat 2: 0.0 m/s

Rank	Heat	Name	Nationality	Time	Notes
1	2	Farzaneh Fasihi	Iran	11.30	Q
2	1	Edidiong Odiong	Bahrain	11.33	Q
2	2	Hajar Al-Khaldi	Bahrain	11.33	Q
4	1	Maboundou Koné	Ivory Coast	11.36	Q
5	2	Hajar Eddaou	Morocco	11.38	Q
6	2	Elif Polat	Turkey	11.43	q
7	1	Olga Safronova	Kazakhstan	11.46	Q
8	2	Iyanuoluwa Toyin Bada	Nigeria	11.66	q
9	1	Mudhawi Al-Shammari	Kuwait	11.68	
10	1	Balikis Temitope Yakubu	Nigeria	11.69	
11	1	Simay Özçiftçi	Turkey	11.74	
12	2	Akouvi Judith Koumedzina	Togo	11.79	
13	2	Valentina Meredova	Turkmenistan	11.87	
14	1	Mazoon Al-Alawi	Oman	11.93	
15	1	Laylo Allaberganova	Uzbekistan	12.13	
	2	Madina Touré	Burkina Faso	DNS	

Final – 9 August
Wind: +1.1 m/s

Rank	Lane	Name	Nationality	Time	Notes
1st place, gold medalist(s)	3	Edidiong Odiong	Bahrain	11.03	
2nd place, silver medalist(s)	6	Farzaneh Fasihi	Iran	11.12	
3rd place, bronze medalist(s)	4	Maboundou Koné	Ivory Coast	11.13	
4	5	Hajar Al-Khaldi	Bahrain	11.18	
5	7	Hajar Eddaou	Morocco	11.20	
6	1	Elif Polat	Turkey	11.32	
7	8	Olga Safronova	Kazakhstan	11.37	
8	2	Iyanuoluwa Toyin Bada	Nigeria	11.60	

=== 200 metres ===
Heats – 10 August
Wind:
Heat 1: +2.0 m/s, Heat 2: +1.3 m/s, Heat 3: +3.3 m/s, Heat 4: +1.5 m/s

Rank	Heat	Name	Nationality	Time	Notes
1	1	Maboundou Koné	Ivory Coast	22.97	Q
2	3	Gina Bass	The Gambia	23.11	Q
3	1	Olga Safronova	Kazakhstan	23.23	Q
3	4	Edidiong Odiong	Bahrain	23.23	Q
5	2	Elif Polat	Turkey	23.24	Q
6	3	Zenab Mahamat	Bahrain	23.33	Q
7	4	Mudhawi Al-Shammari	Kuwait	23.46	Q
8	2	Wurrie Njaddoe	The Gambia	23.47	Q
9	1	Hi̇ba Saeed	Sudan	23.56	Q
10	4	Evelyn Ocen Koli	Uganda	23.96	Q
11	4	Laylo Allaberganova	Uzbekistan	24.15	q
12	1	Bali̇ki̇s Yakubu	Nigeria	24.16	q
13	1	Imane Makrazi	Morocco	24.16	q
14	2	Akouvi̇ Judi̇th Koumedzina	Togo	24.19	Q
15	2	Irene Bell Bonong	Cameroon	24.29	q
16	3	Iyanuoluwa Toyi̇n Bada	Nigeria	24.57	Q
17	2	Ai̇shath Hi̇mna Hassan	Maldives	24.66	
18	2	Ali̇ya Boshnak	Jordan	24.73	
19	3	Ancha Ernesto Mandlate	Mozambique	24.77	
20	3	Hawanahu Fornah	Sierra Leone	25.14	
21	4	Elisa Myrtollari	Albania	25.60	
22	1	Ri̇fa Mohamed	Maldives	26.09	
23	3	Ousmane Housna	Chad	26.14	
24	1	Ousmane Hassanie	Chad	26.67	
25	1	Di̇ma Daralsheikh	Palestine	27.37	
26	4	Yasmeen Al-Dabbagh	Saudi Arabia	27.49	
27	2	Jacira Vaz Martins	Guinea-Bissau	27.90	
	3	Hajjar Eddaou	Morocco	DNF	
	3	Mauren Akiiki Banura	Uganda	DQ	R17.4.3
	4	Chri̇stelle Angounou	Cameroon	DQ	R17.4.3
	2	Ami̇natou Seyni	Niger	DNS	
	4	Farzaneh Fasihi	Iran	DNS	

Semi-finals – 11 August
Wind:
Heat 1: +1.1 m/s, Heat 2: +3.8 m/s

Rank	Heat	Name	Nationality	Time	Notes
1	2	Gina Bass	The Gambia	23.09	Q
2	2	Edidiong Odiong	Bahrain	23.09	Q
3	1	Elif Polat	Turkey	23.16	Q
4	1	Wurrie Njaddoe	The Gambia	23.18	Q
5	2	Olga Safronova	Kazakhstan	23.29	Q
6	1	Maboundou Koné	Ivory Coast	23.30	Q
7	1	Zenab Mahamat	Bahrain	23.30	q
8	2	Mudhawi Al-Shammari	Kuwait	23.56	q
9	1	Hi̇ba Saeed	Sudan	23.62	NR
10	2	Evelyn Ocen Koli	Uganda	23.90	
11	2	Bali̇ki̇s Yakubu	Nigeria	24.22	
12	2	Akouvi̇ Judi̇th Koumedzina	Togo	24.26	
13	2	Imane Makrazi	Morocco	24.32	
14	1	Laylo Allaberganova	Uzbekistan	24.34	
15	1	Irene Bell Bonong	Cameroon	24.37	
	1	Iyanuoluwa Toyi̇n Bada	Nigeria	DNS	

Final – 11 August
Wind: +2.9 m/s

Rank	Lane	Name	Nationality	Time	Notes
1st place, gold medalist(s)	3	Gina Bass	The Gambia	22.63	
2nd place, silver medalist(s)	5	Edidiong Odiong	Bahrain	22.77	
3rd place, bronze medalist(s)	8	Maboundou Koné	Ivory Coast	23.12	
4	6	Wurrie Njaddoe	The Gambia	23.35	
5	4	Elif Polat	Turkey	23.41	
6	2	Zenab Mahamat	Bahrain	23.51	
7	1	Mudhawi Al-Shammari	Kuwait	23.97	
	7	Olga Safronova	Kazakhstan	DNF	

=== 400 metres ===
Heats – 8 August

Rank	Heat	Name	Nationality	Time	Notes
1	1	Muna Mubarak	Bahrain	52.41	Q
2	1	Sara El Hachimi	Morocco	53.93	Q
3	2	Sari Sri Maya	Indonesia	54.23	Q
4	2	Mauren Akiiki Banura	Uganda	55.20	Q
5	1	Farida Solieva	Uzbekistan	55.27	Q
6	2	Alexandra Zalyubovskaya	Kazakhstan	56.68	Q
7	1	Aishath Himna Hassan	Maldives	57.99	q
8	2	Aminath Layaana Mohamed	Maldives	59.79	q
	2	Sarah Ochigbo	Nigeria	DNS	

Final – 10 August

Rank	Lane	Name	Nationality	Time	Notes
1st place, gold medalist(s)	6	Muna Mubarak	Bahrain	52.97	
2nd place, silver medalist(s)	7	Farida Solieva	Uzbekistan	54.07	
3rd place, bronze medalist(s)	3	Sara El Hachimi	Morocco	54.32	
4	4	Sari Sri Maya	Indonesia	54.67	
5	5	Mauren Akiiki Banura	Uganda	55.32	
6	8	Alexandra Zalyubovskaya	Kazakhstan	58.17	
7	2	Aishath Himna Hassan	Maldives	58.84	
8	1	Aminath Layaana Mohamed	Maldives	1:02.04	

=== 800 metres ===
9 August

Rank	Name	Nationality	Time	Notes
1st place, gold medalist(s)	Ekaterina Guliyev	Turkey	2:02.28	
2nd place, silver medalist(s)	Soukaina Hajji	Morocco	2:02.78	
3rd place, bronze medalist(s)	Assia Raziki	Morocco	2:03.03	
4	Şilan Ayyıldız	Turkey	2:04.76	
5	Amna Tama	Sudan	2:11.25	
6	Toktam Dastarbandan	Iran	2:11.46	
7	Ainuska Kalil Kyzy	Kyrgyzstan	2:13.92	
8	Fofana Djenab	Guinea	2:53.29	
	Manal Mohammad El Bahroui	Bahrain	DNF	

=== 1500 metres ===
12 August

Rank	Name	Nationality	Time	Notes
1st place, gold medalist(s)	Winfred Yavi	Bahrain	4:14.35	
2nd place, silver medalist(s)	Ekaterina Guliyev	Turkey	4:16.41	
3rd place, bronze medalist(s)	Soukaina Hajji	Morocco	4:16.65	
4	Janat Chemusto	Uganda	4:16.72	
5	Şilan Ayyıldız	Turkey	4:19.79	
6	Ali Mohamed Souhra	Djibouti	4:20.64	
7	Fraida Hassanatte	Chad	4:28.72	
8	Veronica José	Mozambique	4:28.94	
9	Ainuska Kalil Kyzy	Kyrgyzstan	4:32.52	
10	Amna Tama	Sudan	4:34.51	
11	Amal Al-Roumi	Kuwait	4:36.57	
12	Toktam Dastarbandan	Iran	4:41.29	
13	Dembil Kadra Mohamed	Djibouti	4:48.06	
	Lamyae Himi	Morocco	DNF	

=== 5000 metres ===
11 August

Rank	Name	Nationality	Time	Notes
1st place, gold medalist(s)	Yasemin Can	Turkey	16:23.1	
2nd place, silver medalist(s)	Bontu Rebitu	Bahrain	16:33.6	
3rd place, bronze medalist(s)	Ruth Jebet	Bahrain	16:40.4	
4	Janat Chemusto	Uganda	16:59.9	
5	Kaoutar Farkoussi	Morocco	17:01.4	
6	Rahma Tahiri	Morocco	17:06.0	
7	Yayla Günen	Turkey	17:10.5	
8	Ahmed Djama Habon	Djibouti	17:20.8	
9	Gulshanoi Satarova	Kyrgyzstan	17:26.3	
10	Fraida Hassanatte	Chad	17:38.7	
11	Maheza Anaming	Togo	18:46.8	
12	Hanoia Hasaballa	Sudan	19:10.6	

=== 10,000 metres ===
8 August

Rank	Name	Nationality	Time	Notes
1st place, gold medalist(s)	Yasemin Can	Turkey	32:34.33	
2nd place, silver medalist(s)	Bontu Rebitu	Bahrain	32:59.19	
3rd place, bronze medalist(s)	Ruth Jebet	Bahrain	33:03.13	
4	Rkia El Moukim	Morocco	34:07.23	
5	Hanane Qallouj	Morocco	34:12.17	
6	Yayla Günen	Turkey	35:23.93	
7	Odekta Elvina Naibaho	Indonesia	35:52.19	
8	Gulshanoi Satarova	Kyrgyzstan	36:12.22	
	Mariya Korobitskaya	Kyrgyzstan	DNF	
	Hanoia Hasaballa	Sudan	DNF	

=== 100 metres hurdles ===
Heats – 10 August
Wind:
Heat 1: +1.5 m/s, Heat 2: +0.2 m/s

Rank	Heat	Name	Nationality	Time	Notes
1	2	Şevval Ayaz	Turkey	13.15	Q
2	1	Cansu Nimet Sayın	Turkey	13.58	Q
3	2	Naomi Akakpo	Togo	13.59	Q
4	1	Lidiya Podsepkina	Uzbekistan	13.61	Q
5	2	Emilia Nova	Indonesia	13.70	q
6	2	Noura Ennadi	Morocco	13.79	q
7	2	Khurshidabonu Khollieva	Uzbekistan	14.08	q
8	2	Mazoon Al-Alawi	Oman	14.12	q
9	1	Iri̇na Velihanova	Turkmenistan	14.82	
10	1	Norli̇yana Kamaruddin	Malaysia	14.91	
11	1	Saba Tarabeen	Palestine	17.70	

Final – 11 August

Wind: +3.7 m/s

Rank	Lane	Name	Nationality	Time	Notes
1st place, gold medalist(s)	5	Şevval Ayaz	Turkey	13.21	
2nd place, silver medalist(s)	6	Naomi Akakpo	Togo	13.40	
3rd place, bronze medalist(s)	7	Emilia Nova	Indonesia	13.59	
4	8	Noura Ennadi	Morocco	13.60	
5	3	Cansu Nimet Sayın	Turkey	13.72	
6	2	Khurshidabonu Khollieva	Uzbekistan	13.90	
7	4	Lidiya Podsepkina	Uzbekistan	14.18	
8	1	Mazoon Al-Alawi	Oman	14.18	

=== 400 metres hurdles ===
9 August

Rank	Lane	Name	Nationality	Time	Notes
1st place, gold medalist(s)	5	Noura Ennadi	Morocco	56.15	
2nd place, silver medalist(s)	3	Aminat Yusuf Jamal	Bahrain	56.41	
3rd place, bronze medalist(s)	4	Christelle Angounou	Cameroon	57.92	
4	6	Sarah Ochigbo	Nigeria	1:00.15	
5	7	Saleha Jasim	Burkina Faso	1:05.89	

=== 3000 metres steeplechase ===
10 August

Rank	Name	Nationality	Time	Notes
1st place, gold medalist(s)	Winfred Yavi	Bahrain	9:34:57	
2nd place, silver medalist(s)	Tigest Mekonen	Bahrain	9:50:14	
3rd place, bronze medalist(s)	Ikram Ouaaziz	Morocco	9:57:18	
4	Amina Bettiche	Algeria	10:22:32	

=== 4 × 100 metres relay ===
12 August

Rank	Lane	Nation	Competitors	Time	Notes
1st place, gold medalist(s)	4	Gambia	Ola Buwaro, Wurrie Njadoe, Maimuna Jallou, Gina Bass	43.83	GR, NR
2nd place, silver medalist(s)	2	Bahrain	Fatima Mubarak, Edidiong Odiong, Aminat Yusuf Jamal, Hajar Al-Khaldi	44.11	
3rd place, bronze medalist(s)	5	Turkey	Simay Özçiftçi, Şevval Ayaz, Cansu Nimet Sayın, Elif Polat	44.49	NR
4	7	Maldives	Mariyam Alhaa Hussain, Rifa Mohamed, Aishath Himna Hassan, Aminath Layaana Mohamed	48.21	NR
	3	Uzbekistan	Sharifa Davronova, Khurshidabonu Khollieva, Lidiya Podsepkina, Laylo Allaberganova	DNF	
	6	Morocco	Imane Makrazi, Yousra Lajdoud, Fati̇ma El Alaoui, Hajjar Eddaou	DNF	

=== 4 × 400 metres relay ===
12 August

Rank	Lane	Nation	Competitors	Time	Notes
1st place, gold medalist(s)	4	Bahrain	Zenab Mahamat, Aminat Yusuf Jamal, Awtef Ahmed, Muna Mubarak	3:33.65	
2nd place, silver medalist(s)	5	Turkey	Elif Polat, Ekaterina Guliyev, Büşra Yıldırım, Edanur Tulum	3:35.24	
3rd place, bronze medalist(s)	7	Morocco	Sara El Hachimi, Soukaina Hajji, Noura Ennadi, Assia Raziki	3:35.86	NR
4	6	Uzbekistan	Malika Radjabova, Kamila Mirsalieva, Laylo Allaberganova, Irina Levina	3:50.69	
5	3	Iran	Toktam Dastarbandan, Mahsa Mirzatabibi, Rei̇haneh Mobini Arani, Farzaneh Fasihi	4:32.48	

=== High jump ===
11 August

Rank	Name	Nationality	1.60	1.65	1.70	1.73	1.76	1.79	1.82	1.85	1.87	1.89	1.91	1.97	2.00	Result	Notes
1st place, gold medalist(s)	Safina Sadullayeva	Uzbekistan	–	–	–	–	–	–	o	–	o	o	–	o	xxx	1.97	
2nd place, silver medalist(s)	Svetlana Radzivil	Uzbekistan	–	–	–	–	o	o	o	xo	xo	xxx				1.87	
3rd place, bronze medalist(s)	Kristina Ovchinnikova	Kazakhstan	–	–	–	–	o	xo	o	o	xxo	xxx				1.87	
4	Buse Savaşkan	Turkey	–	–	–	–	o	o	xo	xxx						1.82	
5	Rhizlane Siba	Morocco	–	–	xo	o	o	o	xo	xxx						1.82	
6	Norliyana Kamaruddin	Malaysia	o	o	o	o	xxx									1.73	
7	Most Ritu Akhtar	Bangladesh	o	xo	xo	xxo	xxx									1.73	NR
8	Fatima El Alaoui	Morocco	o	o	xxo	xxx										1.70	
9	Ummay Hafsa Rumky	Bangladesh	o	xo	xxo	xxx										1.70	
10	Yap Sean Yee	Malaysia	o	xxo	xxx											1.65	
11	Ni Made Eppi Wilantika	Indonesia	xo	xxo	xxx											1.65	

=== Pole vault ===
8 August

Rank	Name	Nationality	3.30	3.50	3.70	3.90	4.00	4.10	4.20	Result	Notes
1st place, gold medalist(s)	Buse Arıkazan	Turkey	–	–	–	–	xo	–	xr	4.00	
1st place, gold medalist(s)	Demet Parlak	Turkey	–	–	–	o	xo	–	xr	4.00	
3rd place, bronze medalist(s)	Nor Sarah Adi	Malaysia	–	xxo	o	xxo	xxx			3.90	
4	Mahsa Mirzatabibi	Iran	–	o	xxo	xxx				3.70	
5	Samar Mansouri	Qatar	o	xxx						3.30	
	Jasmina Mansurova	Uzbekistan	xxx							NM	

=== Long jump ===
Qualification – 8 August

Rank	Group	Name	Nationality	#1	#2	#3	Result	Notes
1	A	Marthe Koala	Burkina Faso	6.10w	6.36w		6.36w	Q
2	A	Maria Natalia Londa	Indonesia	6.06w	x	6.35w	6.35w	Q
3	A	Roksana Khudoyarova	Uzbekistan	6.10w	6.29w	5.80w	6.29w	q
4	A	Tuğba Danışmaz	Turkey	6.17	6.27w	–	6.27w	q
5	B	Yousra Lajdoud	Morocco	6.26w	6.08w	x	6.26w	q
6	A	Darya Reznichenko	Uzbekistan	5.84w	6.26w	x	6.26w	q
7	B	Gizem Akgöz	Turkey	6.01w	6.16w	6.04	6.16w	q
8	B	Reihaneh Mobini Arani	Iran	6.08	x	6.04w	6.08	q
9	A	Fatima Mubarak	Bahrain	5.76w	5.67w	6.05w	6.05w	q
10	B	Yekaterina Sariyeva	Azerbaijan	5.18	5.98w	5.79	5.98w	q
11	B	Yelena Pekhtireva	Azerbaijan	5.92	5.92w	5.78	5.92	q
12	A	Fayza Issaka Abdoukerim	Togo	5.70w	5.57w	5.61w	5.70w	q
13	A	Hortense Noudjilar	Chad	4.70w	4.95w	4.95w	4.95w	
14	B	Saba Tarabeen	Palestine	4.38w	4.66w	4.33	4.66w	
15	B	Noora Abdul Hameed	Maldives	4.64	x	4.65	4.65	
	A	Kandji Sangoné	Senegal				DNS	
	B	Saly Sarr	Senegal				DNS	

Final – 9 August

Rank	Name	Nationality	#1	#2	#3	#4	#5	#6	Result	Notes
1st place, gold medalist(s)	Marthe Koala	Burkina Faso	6.08w	5.87	6.11w	6.26w	6.53w	6.21	6.53w	
2nd place, silver medalist(s)	Tuğba Danışmaz	Turkey	6.14	6.34w	4.90	6.15	x	x	6.34w	
3rd place, bronze medalist(s)	Roksana Khudoyarova	Uzbekistan	6.06w	6.10w	6.12	6.25	6.31	6.32	6.32w	
4	Yousra Lajdoud	Morocco	4.61	6.12	5.71w	6.06	6.25	6.30	6.30	
5	Darya Reznichenko	Uzbekistan	6.28	6.08	6.19	6.20w	x	6.06	6.28	
6	Gizem Akgöz	Turkey	x	5.51	5.97	5.76	6.28	6.20	6.28	
7	Maria Natalia Londa	Indonesia	6.18	x	6.15w	x	6.16	6.06	6.18	
8	Fatima Mubarak	Bahrain	6.01w	5.49	5.84	x	x	x	6.01w	
9	Yekaterina Sariyeva	Azerbaijan	5.90	5.88	5.82				5.90	
10	Yelena Pekhtireva	Azerbaijan	5.76	5.75w	5.66				5.76	
11	Reihaneh Mobini Arani	Iran	x	2.97	5.54				5.54	
12	Fayza Issaka Abdoukerim	Togo	5.33	5.47	x				5.47	

=== Triple jump ===
11 August

Rank	Name	Nationality	#1	#2	#3	#4	#5	#6	Result	Notes
1st place, gold medalist(s)	Sharifa Davronova	Uzbekistan	13.88w	14.30w	13.47w	x	14.12w	x	14.30w	
2nd place, silver medalist(s)	Yekaterina Sariyeva	Azerbaijan	14.10w	14.12w	13.85	x	x	13.52w	14.12w	
3rd place, bronze medalist(s)	Tuğba Danışmaz	Turkey	13.86w	13.64w	x	13.64w	13.95w	x	13.95w	
4	Roksana Khudoyarova	Uzbekistan	13.87w	x	13.62w	13.31w	13.63	13.56w	13.87w	
5	Mariya Yefremova	Kazakhstan	13.84w	13.51w	13.79w	x	x	x	13.84w	
6	Gizem Akgöz	Turkey	13.82w	x	x	–	13.83w	x	13.83w	
7	Sangone Kandji	Senegal	13.64w	13.00w	13.28w	13.38	13.38w	13.28w	13.64w	
8	Saly Sarr	Senegal	13.31w	13.60w	13.48w	x	13.27w	x	13.60w	
9	Veronique Kossenda Rey	Cameroon	x	12.99w	12.98w				12.99w	
10	Fayza Issaka Abdoukerim	Togo	12.42w	12.15w	12.67w				12.67w	
	Yousra Lajdoud	Morocco	–	x	x				NM	
	Maria Natalia Londa	Indonesia							DNS	
	Hortense Noudjilar	Chad							DNS	

=== Shot put ===
8 August

Rank	Name	Nationality	#1	#2	#3	#4	#5	#6	Result	Notes
1st place, gold medalist(s)	Emel Dereli	Turkey	16.83	17.25	r				17.25	
2nd place, silver medalist(s)	Pınar Akyol	Turkey	15.99	x	16.87	x	x	15.96	16.87	
3rd place, bronze medalist(s)	Eki Febri Ekawati	Indonesia	14.01	14.65	14.93	13.95	14.47	13.53	14.93	
4	Zineb Zeroual	Morocco	13.80	14.23	13.85	x	13.51	13.02	14.23	
5	Zouina Bouzebra	Algeria	10.99	r					10.99	
	Nora Atim Monie	Cameroon							DNS	

=== Discus throw ===
9 August

Rank	Name	Nationality	#1	#2	#3	#4	#5	#6	Result	Notes
1st place, gold medalist(s)	Özlem Becerek	Turkey	54.59	x	50.57	x	x	54.91	GR	
2nd place, silver medalist(s)	Nurten Mermer	Turkey	47.72	52.85	x	x	x	x	52.85	
3rd place, bronze medalist(s)	Nora Atim Monie	Cameroon	44.51	x	9.53	50.19	x	x	50.19	
4	Queenie Kung Ni Ting	Malaysia	44.46	48.72	x	47.62	47.64	x	48.72	
5	Josephine Lalam	Uganda	x	42.74	38.70	39.72	42.18	40.88	42.74	
	Jihane Mrabet	Morocco	x	x	x	x	x	x	NM	

=== Hammer throw ===
8 August

Rank	Name	Nationality	#1	#2	#3	#4	#5	#6	Result	Notes
1st place, gold medalist(s)	Hanna Skydan	Azerbaijan	70.07	63.74	70.23	x	x	x	70.23	
2nd place, silver medalist(s)	Kıvılcım Kaya Salman	Turkey	x	x	x	x	65.68	x	65.68	
3rd place, bronze medalist(s)	Zouina Bouzebra	Algeria	59.51	57.75	x	x	54.98	57.28	59.51	
4	Zarinakhon Nosirjonova	Uzbekistan	53.47	x	58.61	x	59.30	x	59.30	
5	Soukaina Zakkour	Morocco	53.38	x	58.89	x	55.44	58.63	58.89	
6	Samira Addi	Morocco	58.30	x	54.03	56.44	55.21	x	58.30	
7	Nurul Hidayah Lukman	Malaysia	x	50.28	51.59	x	x	x	51.59	

=== Javelin throw ===
10 August

Rank	Name	Nationality	#1	#2	#3	#4	#5	#6	Result	Notes
1st place, gold medalist(s)	Esra Türkmen	Turkey	x	57.04	57.46	56.72	56.81	57.29	57.46	
2nd place, silver medalist(s)	Eda Tuǧsuz	Turkey	x	x	56.21	x	56.59	x	56.59	
3rd place, bronze medalist(s)	Nargizakron Kuchkarova	Uzbekistan	49.90	54.57	53.72	55.00	54.42	56.08	56.08	
4	Musharraf Sayidakhmedova	Uzbekistan	56.05	x	52.79	53.27	55.12	54.86	56.05	
5	Josephine Lalam	Uganda	x	x	51.11	x	51.00	50.70	51.11	
6	Jennet Muhamova	Turkmenistan	46.40	45.53	x	46.12	49.41	46.04	49.41	

== Mixed results ==
=== 4 × 400 metres relay ===
11 August

Rank	Lane	Nation	Competitors	Time	Notes
1st place, gold medalist(s)	5	Bahrain	Ali Khamis (M), Zenab Mahamat (W), Musa Isah (M), Muna Mubarak (W)	3:17.40	GR
2nd place, silver medalist(s)	3	Morocco	Rachid M'hamdi (M), Sara El Hachimi (W), Hamza Dair (M), Assia Raziki (W)	3:20.29	NR
3rd place, bronze medalist(s)	4	Turkey	Oğuzhan Kaya (M), Edanur Tulum (W), Sinan Ören (M), Büşra Yıldırım (W)	3:22.90	
4	7	Cameroon	Linda Nganguele (M), Irene Bell Bonong (W), Tentdap Nsangou (M), Christelle Angounou (W)	3:28.72	NR
5	6	Uzbekistan	Oskar Kuchmuradov (M), Malika Radjobova (W), Arthur Kharisov (M), Farida Solieva (W)	3:44.67	
