= Kazakhstan at the 2021 Islamic Solidarity Games =

- IOC code: KAZ
- NOC: National Olympic Committee of the Republic of Kazakhstan

in Konya, Turkey
- Competitors: 125
- Medals Ranked 5th: Gold 27 Silver 23 Bronze 39 Total 89

Islamic Solidarity Games appearances (overview)
- 2005; 2013; 2017; 2021; 2025

Kazakhstan participated in the 2021 Islamic Solidarity Games held in Konya, Turkey from 9 to 18 August 2022.

The games had been rescheduled several times. In May 2021, the ISSF postponed the event to August 2022 citing the COVID-19 pandemic situation in the participating countries.

== Medalists ==
Medal	Name	Sport	Event	Date
Gold	Rinata Sultanova	Cycling	Women's scratch	5 August
Gold	Rinata Sultanova	Cycling	Women's individual pursuit	6 August
Gold	Alisher Zhumakan	Cycling	Men's individual pursuit	6 August
Gold	Artyom Zakharov	Cycling	Men's omnium	8 August
Gold	Rinata Sultanova	Cycling	Women's omnium	8 August
Gold	Arli Chontey	Weightlifting	Men's 55 kg Clean & Jerk	11 August
Gold	Arli Chontey	Weightlifting	Men's 55 kg total	11 August
Gold	Zulfiya Chinshanlo	Weightlifting	Women's 59 kg snatch	11 August
Gold	Zulfiya Chinshanlo	Weightlifting	Women's 59 kg Clean & Jerk	11 August
Gold	Zulfiya Chinshanlo	Weightlifting	Women's 59 kg total	11 August
Gold	Aizada Muptilda	Weightlifting	Women's +87 kg snatch	15 August
Gold	Aizada Muptilda	Weightlifting	Women's +87 kg Clean & Jerk	15 August
Gold	Aizada Muptilda	Weightlifting	Women's +87 kg total	15 August
Gold	Yelena Shalygina	Wrestling	Women's freestyle 65 kg	12 August
Gold	Mikhail Litvin	Athletics	Men's 400 metres	8 August
Gold	Adilbek Mussin	Swimming	Men's 100 m butterfly	14 August
Gold	Adelaida Pchelintseva	Swimming	Women's 50 m breaststroke	13 August
Gold	Sofiya Abubakirova	Swimming	Women's 50 m butterfly	13 August
Gold	Elzhana Taniyeva	Gymnastics	Rhythmic ball	13 August
Silver	Dmitriy Moskov	Cycling	Men's individual pursuit	6 August
Silver	Arli Chontey	Weightlifting	Men's 55 kg snatch	11 August
Silver	Alexey Churkin	Weightlifting	Men's 73 kg snatch	13 August
Silver	Alexey Churkin	Weightlifting	Men's 73 kg Clean & Jerk	13 August
Silver	Alexey Churkin	Weightlifting	Men's 73 kg total	13 August
Silver	Assylzhan Bektay	Weightlifting	Men's 89 kg snatch	14 August
Silver	Artyom Antropov	Weightlifting	Men's 102 kg Clean & Jerk	14 August
Silver	Artyom Antropov	Weightlifting	Men's 102 kg total	14 August
Silver	Aray Nurlybekova	Weightlifting	Women's 76 kg snatch	11 August
Silver	Aray Nurlybekova	Weightlifting	Women's 76 kg Clean & Jerk	11 August
Silver	Aray Nurlybekova	Weightlifting	Women's 76 kg total	11 August
Silver	Aisha Omarova	Weightlifting	Women's 81 kg Clean & Jerk	14 August
Silver	Aisha Omarova	Weightlifting	Women's 81 kg total	14 August
Silver	Lyubov Kovalchuk	Weightlifting	Women's +87 kg snatch	15 August
Silver	Lyubov Kovalchuk	Weightlifting	Women's +87 kg Clean & Jerk	15 August
Silver	Lyubov Kovalchuk	Weightlifting	Women's +87 kg total	15 August
Silver	Madina Bakbergenova	Wrestling	Women's freestyle 68 kg	12 August
Bronze	Alisher Zhumakan	Cycling	Men's scratch	5 August
Bronze	Marina Kuzmina	Cycling	Women's individual pursuit	6 August
Bronze	Svetlana Pachshenko	Cycling	Women's points race	7 August
Bronze	Denis Zholudev	Table tennis	Men's individual	8 August
Bronze	Otepbergen Aliyev	Weightlifting	Men's 61 kg Clean & Jerk	11 August
Bronze	Otepbergen Aliyev	Weightlifting	Men's 61 kg total	11 August
Bronze	Assylzhan Bektay	Weightlifting	Men's 89 kg total	14 August
Bronze	Rakhat Kalzhan	Wrestling	Men's freestyle 57 kg	10 August
Bronze	Adlan Askarov	Wrestling	Men's freestyle 65 kg	10 August
Bronze	Mamed Ibragimov	Wrestling	Men's freestyle 97 kg	10 August
Bronze	Amangali Bekbolatov	Wrestling	Men's Greco-Roman 55 kg	12 August
Bronze	Ellada Makhyaddinova	Wrestling	Women's freestyle 53 kg	11 August
Bronze	Irina Kuznetsova	Wrestling	Women's freestyle 62 kg	11 August
Bronze	Zhamila Bakbergenova	Wrestling	Women's freestyle 72 kg	11 August
Bronze	Kristina Ovchinnikova	Athletics	Women's high jump	8 August
Bronze	Kseniya Ignatova	Swimming	Women's 100 m backstroke	14 August
Bronze	Kseniya Ignatova	Swimming	Women's 200 m backstroke	15 August
Bronze	Daniela Dyu	Swimming	Women's 100 m freestyle	15 August
Bronze	Kanat Seilkhan	Judo	Men's 60 kg	15 August
Bronze	Jasurbek Kluchov	Taekwondo	Men's 54 kg	9 August
Bronze	Bauyrzhan Khassenov	Taekwondo	Men's +87 kg	12 August
Bronze	Cansel Deniz	Taekwondo	Women's 73 kg	11 August
Bronze	Elzhana Taniyeva	Gymnastics	Rhythmic hoop	13 August
Bronze	Elzhana Taniyeva	Gymnastics	Rhythmic ribbon	13 August
Bronze	Kazakhstan rhythmic team	Gymnastics	Group 5 Hoops	13 August
Bronze	Kazakhstan rhythmic team	Gymnastics	Rhythmic team	13 August
Bronze	Kazakhstan rhythmic team	Gymnastics	Group All-Around	13 August

Medals by sport
Sport	1st place, gold medalist(s)	2nd place, silver medalist(s)	3rd place, bronze medalist(s)	Total
Athletics	1	0	1	2
Cycling	5	1	4	10
Gymnastics	2	4	8	14
Judo	0	0	1	1
Karate	2	0	1	3
Kickboxing	4	1	3	8
Swimming	4	1	7	12
Table tennis	0	0	1	1
Taekwondo	0	0	3	3
Weightlifting	8	15	3	26
Wrestling	1	1	7	9
Total	27	23	39	89

== Wrestling ==
Men's freestyle

Athlete	Event	Round of 16	Quarterfinal	Semifinal	Repesaj	Final / BM	
Athlete	Event	Opposition Result	Opposition Result	Opposition Result	Opposition Result	Opposition Result	Rank
Rakhat Kalzhan	57 kg	Alb (SUD); W 10-0	Kızıltaş (TUR); W 9-3	Abdullaev (UZB); L 2-3	—N/a	Almaktari (YEM); W 10-0	3rd place, bronze medalist(s)
Adlan Askarov	65 kg	Bye	Abakarov (ALB); L 0-10	—N/a		Hojakov (TKM); W 8-0	3rd place, bronze medalist(s)
Nurkozha Kaipanov	74 kg	Zhaparkulov (KGZ); W 5-0	Sharipov (TJK); W 11-0	Firouzpour (IRI); L 2-3	—N/a	Eryılmaz (TUR); L 7-8	5
Meiir Koshkinbayev	79 kg	Bye	Savadkouhi (IRI); L 1-3	—N/a	Masakwe (UGA); W 10-0	Omarov (AZE); L 4-10	5
Abdimanap Baigenzheev	92 kg	—N/a	Bazri (IRI); L 2-13	—N/a		Nurmagomedov (AZE); L 0-10	5
Mamed Ibragimov	97 kg	Bye	Ilyasov (AZE); W 3-1	Goleij (IRI); L 2-13	—N/a	Kubatov (KGZ); W 11-0	3rd place, bronze medalist(s)

Men's Greco-Roman

Athlete	Event	Round of 16	Quarterfinal	Semifinal	Repesaj	Final / BM	
Athlete	Event	Opposition Result	Opposition Result	Opposition Result	Opposition Result	Opposition Result	Rank
Amangali Bekbolatov	55 kg	—N/a	Muratbek Uulu (KGZ); W 13-4	Azizli (AZE); L 1-3	—N/a	Durdyýew (TKM); W 8-0	3rd place, bronze medalist(s)
Yernar Fidakhmetov	60 kg	Bye	Mammadov (AZE); L 1-4	—N/a		Karakuş (TUR); L 2-6	5
Dias Kalen	82 kg	Kuş (TUR); L 4-10	did not advance				7

Athlete	Event	Group Stage				Semifinal	Final / BM	
Athlete	Event	Opposition Result	Opposition Result	Opposition Result	Rank	Opposition Result	Opposition Result	Rank
Anton Savenko	130 kg	Shariati (AZE); L 1-5	Abdullaev (UZB); W 5-3	—N/a	2	Yousefi (IRI); L 1-9	Shariati (AZE); L 0-5	4

Women's freestyle

Athlete	Event	Round of 16	Quarterfinal	Semifinal	Repesaj	Final / BM	
Athlete	Event	Opposition Result	Opposition Result	Opposition Result	Opposition Result	Opposition Result	Rank
Ellada Makhyaddinova	53 kg	—N/a	Keunimjaeva (UZB); L 5-8	—N/a		Shakarshoeva (TJK); W 7-2	3rd place, bronze medalist(s)
Irina Kuznetsova	62 kg	—N/a	Tynybekova (KGZ); L 2-12	—N/a		Goudiaby (SEN); W 5-0	3rd place, bronze medalist(s)
Zhamila Bakbergenova	72 kg	Bye	Tosun (TUR); L 1-2	—N/a	Ovlyakulyyeva (TKM); W 10-0	Sambou (SEN); W 10-0	3rd place, bronze medalist(s)

Group Stage Format

Athlete	Event	Group Stage			Semifinal	Final / BM	
Athlete	Event	Opposition Result	Opposition Result	Rank	Opposition Result	Opposition Result	Rank
Svetlana Ankicheva	50 kg	Stadnik (AZE); L 0–10	Çataloğlu (TUR); W 4–1	2 Q	Immaeva (UZB); L 0–7	Hamdi (TUN); L 1–5	4
Laura Almaganbetova	57 kg	Sobirova (UZB); W 4–1	Aliyeva (AZE); L 2–9	2 Q	Kolawole (NGR); L 0–11	Kamaloğlu (TUR); L 2–6	4
Yelena Shalygina	65 kg	Manolova (AZE); L 4–5	Jumabaeva (UZB); W 6–2	2 Q	Sazanova (KGZ); W 12–1	Manolova (AZE); W 3–3	1st place, gold medalist(s)
Madina Bakbergenova	68 kg	Egemberdiyeva (TKM); W 11–0	Elnour (SUD); W WO	1 Q	Demir (TUR); W 12–6	Zhumanazarova (KGZ); L 0–11	2nd place, silver medalist(s)
Inkara Zhanatayeva	76 kg	Gültekin (TUR); W 5–4	Zaripboeva (UZB); W 7-0	1 Q	Youin (CIV); L 0–10	Gültekin (TUR); L 1–7	4

Nordic Format

Athlete	Event	Nordic Round Robin				Rank
Athlete	Event	Opposition Result	Opposition Result	Opposition Result	Opposition Result	Rank
Guldana Bekesh	59 kg	Adekuoroye (NGR); L 0–10	Çelik (TUR); W 2–0	Kolesnik (AZE); L 0–12	Aimbetova (UZB); L 0–5	5

== Weightlifting ==
Men

Athlete	Event	Snatch		Clean & Jerk		Total	Result
Athlete	Event	Result	Rank	Result	Rank	Total	Result
Arli Chontey	-55kg	114	2nd place, silver medalist(s)	139	1st place, gold medalist(s)	253 (GR)	1st place, gold medalist(s)
Otepbergen Aliyev	-61kg	120	4	151	3rd place, bronze medalist(s)	271	3rd place, bronze medalist(s)
Alexey Churkin	-73kg	145	2nd place, silver medalist(s)	170	2nd place, silver medalist(s)	315	3rd place, bronze medalist(s)
Yelaman Seitkazy	-81kg	151	7	185	6	336	6
Assylzhan Bektay	-89kg	191	5	162	2nd place, silver medalist(s)	353	3rd place, bronze medalist(s)
Sergey Petrovich	-89kg	190	6	156	7	346	5
Kirill Staroverkin	-96kg	158	4	186	4	344	5
Artyom Antropov	-102kg	164	6	222	2nd place, silver medalist(s)	386	2nd place, silver medalist(s)

Women

Athlete	Event	Snatch		Clean & Jerk		Total	Result
Athlete	Event	Result	Rank	Result	Rank	Total	Result
Zulfiya Chinshanlo	-59kg	95	1st place, gold medalist(s)	125	1st place, gold medalist(s)	220	1st place, gold medalist(s)
Aray Nurlybekova	-76kg	94	2nd place, silver medalist(s)	121	2nd place, silver medalist(s)	215	2nd place, silver medalist(s)
Aisha Omarova	-81kg	98	4	128	2nd place, silver medalist(s)	226	2nd place, silver medalist(s)
Aiym Yeszhanova	-81kg	90	5	115	5	205	5
Aizada Muptilda	+87kg	116	1st place, gold medalist(s)	150	1st place, gold medalist(s)	266	1st place, gold medalist(s)
Lyubov Kovalchuk	+87kg	114	2nd place, silver medalist(s)	147	2nd place, silver medalist(s)	261	2nd place, silver medalist(s)
