= Judo at the 2021 Islamic Solidarity Games =

Judo competition

Judo Judo at the 2021 Islamic Solidarity Games
- Venue: Konya Technical University Sports Hall
- Location: Konya, Turkey
- Dates: 15–17 August 2022
- Competitors: 198 from 36 nations

Competition at external databases
- Links: IJF • JudoInside

Judo at the 2021 Islamic Solidarity Games was held in Konya, Turkey from 15 to 17 August 2022.

== Medalists ==
=== Men's events ===
Event	Gold	Silver	Bronze
Extra-lightweight (–60 kg)	Balabay Aghayev; Azerbaijan	Kemran Nurillaev; Uzbekistan	Hakberdi Jumaýew; Turkmenistan
Extra-lightweight (–60 kg)	Balabay Aghayev; Azerbaijan	Kemran Nurillaev; Uzbekistan	Kanat Seilkhan; Kazakhstan
Half-lightweight (–66 kg)	Sardor Nurillaev; Uzbekistan	Abderrahmane Boushita; Morocco	Hekim Agamämmedow; Turkmenistan
Half-lightweight (–66 kg)	Sardor Nurillaev; Uzbekistan	Abderrahmane Boushita; Morocco	Ramazan Kodzhakov; Bahrain
Lightweight (–73 kg)	Shakhram Ahadov; Uzbekistan	Nariman Mirzayev; Azerbaijan	Telman Valiyev; Azerbaijan
Lightweight (–73 kg)	Shakhram Ahadov; Uzbekistan	Nariman Mirzayev; Azerbaijan	Umalt Demirel; Turkey
Half-middleweight (–81 kg)	Vedat Albayrak; Turkey	Nugzari Tatalashvili; United Arab Emirates	Shodmon Rizoev; Tajikistan
Half-middleweight (–81 kg)	Vedat Albayrak; Turkey	Nugzari Tatalashvili; United Arab Emirates	Sharofiddin Boltaboev; Uzbekistan
Middleweight (–90 kg)	Mihael Žgank; Turkey	Komronshokh Ustopiriyon; Tajikistan	Davlat Bobonov; Uzbekistan
Middleweight (–90 kg)	Mihael Žgank; Turkey	Komronshokh Ustopiriyon; Tajikistan	Aram Grigorian; United Arab Emirates
Half-heavyweight (–100 kg)	Muzaffarbek Turoboyev; Uzbekistan	Elmar Gasimov; Azerbaijan	Akobir Abubakri; Tajikistan
Half-heavyweight (–100 kg)	Muzaffarbek Turoboyev; Uzbekistan	Elmar Gasimov; Azerbaijan	Mert Şişmanlar; Turkey
Heavyweight (+100 kg)	Magomedomar Magomedomarov; United Arab Emirates	Alisher Yusupov; Uzbekistan	Mbagnick Ndiaye; Senegal
Heavyweight (+100 kg)	Magomedomar Magomedomarov; United Arab Emirates	Alisher Yusupov; Uzbekistan	Azamat Chotchaev; Bahrain
Team	Azerbaijan; Balabay Aghayev; Ibrahim Aliyev; Elmar Gasimov; Nariman Mirzayev; Zelim Tckaev; Telman Valiyev; Imran Yusifov	Turkey; Vedat Albayrak; Ömer Kemal Aydın; Umalt Demirel; Bayram Kandemir; Mert Şişmanlardan; Ejder Toktay; Mihael Žgank	Tajikistan
Team	Azerbaijan; Balabay Aghayev; Ibrahim Aliyev; Elmar Gasimov; Nariman Mirzayev; Zelim Tckaev; Telman Valiyev; Imran Yusifov	Turkey; Vedat Albayrak; Ömer Kemal Aydın; Umalt Demirel; Bayram Kandemir; Mert Şişmanlardan; Ejder Toktay; Mihael Žgank	Iran

=== Women's events ===
Event	Gold	Silver	Bronze
Extra-lightweight (–48 kg)	Tuğçe Beder; Turkey	Konul Aliyeva; Azerbaijan	Imene Rezzoug; Algeria
Extra-lightweight (–48 kg)	Tuğçe Beder; Turkey	Konul Aliyeva; Azerbaijan	Oumaima Bedioui; Tunisia
Half-lightweight (–52 kg)	Diyora Keldiyorova; Uzbekistan	Soumiya Iraoui; Morocco	Sita Kadamboeva; Uzbekistan
Half-lightweight (–52 kg)	Diyora Keldiyorova; Uzbekistan	Soumiya Iraoui; Morocco	İlayda Merve Koçyiğit; Turkey
Lightweight (–57 kg)	Nilufar Ermaganbetova; Uzbekistan	Yamina Halata; Algeria	Zouleiha Abzetta Dabonne; Ivory Coast
Lightweight (–57 kg)	Nilufar Ermaganbetova; Uzbekistan	Yamina Halata; Algeria	İrem Korkmaz; Turkey
Half-middleweight (–63 kg)	Amina Belkadi; Algeria	Şeyma Özerler; Turkey	Zülhumar Daşkinowa; Turkmenistan
Half-middleweight (–63 kg)	Amina Belkadi; Algeria	Şeyma Özerler; Turkey	Sevinch Isokova; Uzbekistan
Middleweight (–70 kg)	Gulnoza Matniyazova; Uzbekistan	Nihel Landolsi; Tunisia	Shokhista Nazarova; Uzbekistan
Middleweight (–70 kg)	Gulnoza Matniyazova; Uzbekistan	Nihel Landolsi; Tunisia	Minel Akdeniz; Turkey
Half-heavyweight (–78 kg)	Nurcan Yılmaz; Turkey	Shakhida Narmukhamedova; Kyrgyzstan	Hafsa Yatim; Morocco
Half-heavyweight (–78 kg)	Nurcan Yılmaz; Turkey	Shakhida Narmukhamedova; Kyrgyzstan	Kaouthar Ouallal; Algeria
Heavyweight (+78 kg)	Kayra Sayit; Turkey	Sonia Asselah; Algeria	Sarra Mzougui; Tunisia
Heavyweight (+78 kg)	Kayra Sayit; Turkey	Sonia Asselah; Algeria	Monica Sagna; Senegal
Team	Turkey; Minel Akdeniz; Tuğçe Beder; İlayda Merve Koçyiğit; İrem Korkmaz; Şeyma Özerler; Kayra Sayit; Nurcan Yılmaz	Cameroon; Ayuk Otay Arrey Sophina; Marie Céline Baba Matia; Zita Ornella Biami; Audrey Jeannette Etoua Biock	Azerbaijan; Sudaba Aghaeva; Konul Aliyeva; Leyla Aliyeva; Sabina Aliyeva; Nargiz Hajieva; Gunel Hasanli; Gultaj Mammadaliyeva
Team	Turkey; Minel Akdeniz; Tuğçe Beder; İlayda Merve Koçyiğit; İrem Korkmaz; Şeyma Özerler; Kayra Sayit; Nurcan Yılmaz	Cameroon; Ayuk Otay Arrey Sophina; Marie Céline Baba Matia; Zita Ornella Biami; Audrey Jeannette Etoua Biock	Algeria Sonia Asselah; Yamina Halata; Kaouthar Ouallal; Faïza Aissahine; Imène Rezzoug; Amina Belkadi

== Medal table ==
* Host nation (Turkey)

Rank	Nation	Gold	Silver	Bronze	Total
1	Turkey*	6	2	5	13
1	Uzbekistan	6	2	5	13
3	Azerbaijan	2	3	2	7
4	Algeria	1	2	3	6
5	United Arab Emirates	1	1	1	3
6	Morocco	0	2	1	3
7	Tajikistan	0	1	3	4
8	Tunisia	0	1	2	3
9	Cameroon	0	1	0	1
9	Kyrgyzstan	0	1	0	1
11	Turkmenistan	0	0	3	3
12	Bahrain	0	0	2	2
12	Senegal	0	0	2	2
14	Iran	0	0	1	1
14	Ivory Coast	0	0	1	1
14	Kazakhstan	0	0	1	1
Totals (16 entries)		16	16	32	64

== Participating nations ==
198 judokas from 36 countries participated:

1. Afghanistan (1)
2. Albania (2)
3. Algeria (13)
4. Azerbaijan (14)
5. Bahrain (3)
6. Cameroon (6)
7. Chad (6)
8. Comoros (2)
9. Djibouti (1)
10. The Gambia (5)
11. Guinea (2)
12. Guinea-Bissau (2)
13. Indonesia (4)
14. Iran (14)
15. Ivory Coast (1)
16. Kazakhstan (7)
17. Kuwait (1)
18. Kyrgyzstan (11)
19. Lebanon (2)
20. Mauritania (2)
21. Morocco (7)
22. Mozambique (5)
23. Niger (2)
24. Pakistan (3)
25. Palestine (2)
26. Qatar (3)
27. Saudi Arabia (3)
28. Senegal (8)
29. Tajikistan (10)
30. Tunisia (6)
31. Turkey (14)
32. Turkmenistan (11)
33. Uganda (3)
34. United Arab Emirates (5)
35. Uzbekistan (14)
36. Yemen (5)
