= Kyrgyzstan at the 2021 Islamic Solidarity Games =

- IOC code: KGZ
- NOC: National Olympic Committee of the Kyrgyz Republic

in Konya, Turkey
- Competitors: 112
- Medals: Gold 8 Silver 8 Bronze 15 Total 31

Islamic Solidarity Games appearances (overview)
- 2005; 2013; 2017; 2021; 2025

Kyrgyzstan participated in the 2021 Islamic Solidarity Games held in Konya, Turkey from 9 to 18 August 2022.

The games had been rescheduled several times. In May 2021, the ISSF postponed the event to August 2022 citing the COVID-19 pandemic situation in the participating countries.

== Medalists ==
Medal	Name	Sport	Event	Date
Gold	Ernazar Akmataliev	Wrestling	Men's freestyle 70 kg	11 August
Gold	Zholaman Sharshenbekov	Wrestling	Men's Greco-Roman 60 kg	13 August
Gold	Akzhol Makhmudov	Wrestling	Men's Greco-Roman 77 kg	13 August
Gold	Aisuluu Tynybekova	Wrestling	Women's freestyle 62 kg	11 August
Gold	Meerim Zhumanazarova	Wrestling	Women's freestyle 68 kg	13 August
Gold	Aiperi Medet Kyzy	Wrestling	Women's freestyle 76 kg	12 August
Gold	Yntymak Muradil Uulu	Traditional Turkish Archery	Men's 70m Target Shooting	15 August
Gold	Denis Petrashov	Swimming	Men's 100 m breaststroke	16 August
Silver	Almaz Smanbekov	Wrestling	Men's freestyle 57 kg	10 August
Silver	Tynar Sharshenbekov	Wrestling	Men's Greco-Roman 63 kg	12 August
Silver	Amantur Ismailov	Wrestling	Men's Greco-Roman 67 kg	13 August
Silver	Kalidin Asykeev	Wrestling	Men's Greco-Roman 82 kg	12 August
Silver	Uzur Dzhuzupbekov	Wrestling	Men's Greco-Roman 97 kg	12 August
Silver	Emil Moldodosov	Weightlifting	Men's 89 kg total	14 August
Silver	Shakhida Narmukhamedova	Judo	Women's 78 kg	16 August
Bronze	Nurtilek Karypbaev	Wrestling	Men's freestyle 86 kg	10 August
Bronze	Atabek Azisbek	Wrestling	Men's Greco-Roman 87 kg	13 August
Bronze	Dilnaz Sazanova	Wrestling	Women's freestyle 65 kg	12 August
Bronze	Denis Petrashov	Swimming	Men's 50 m breaststroke	13 August
Bronze	Emil Moldodosov	Weightlifting	Men's 89 kg snatch	14 August
Bronze	Emil Moldodosov	Weightlifting	Men's 89 kg Clean & Jerk	14 August
Bronze	Denis Petrashov	Swimming	Men's 50 m breaststroke	13 August
Bronze	Denis Petrashov	Swimming	Men's 200 m breaststroke	13 August
Bronze	Bekdoolot Rasulbekov	Weightlifting	Men's 102 kg Clean & Jerk	15 August
Bronze	Bekdoolot Rasulbekov	Weightlifting	Men's 102 kg total	15 August
Bronze	Kanymzhan Almazbek Kyzy	Weightlifting	Women's 87 kg snatch	15 August
Bronze	Kanymzhan Almazbek Kyzy	Weightlifting	Women's 87 kg Clean & Jerk	15 August
Bronze	Kanymzhan Almazbek Kyzy	Weightlifting	Women's 87 kg total	15 August

Medals by sport
Sport	1st place, gold medalist(s)	2nd place, silver medalist(s)	3rd place, bronze medalist(s)	Total
Fencing	1	0	1	2
Judo	0	1	0	1
Kickboxing	0	1	2	3
Swimming	1	0	2	3
Traditional archery	1	0	0	1
Weightlifting	0	1	7	8
Wrestling	6	5	3	14
Total	8	8	15	31

== Basketball ==
=== Men's 3x3 tournament ===
Group D

Pos	Team	Pld	W	L	PF	PA	PD	Qualification
1	Suriname	2	2	0	38	27	+11	Quarterfinals
2	Turkmenistan	2	1	1	29	30	−1	Quarterfinals
3	Kyrgyzstan	2	0	2	31	41	−10	

Source: Konya 2021
Rules for classification: 1) Wins; 2) Head-to-head record; 3) Points scored.

14 August
16:00

Report

Suriname	20–19	Kyrgyzstan

Karatay Congress and Sport Center Konya

16 August
19:10

Report

Turkmenistan	21–12	Kyrgyzstan

Karatay Congress and Sport Center Konya

=== Women's 3x3 tournament ===
Group B

Pos	Team	Pld	W	L	PF	PA	PD	Qualification
1	Azerbaijan	2	2	0	35	16	+19	Quarterfinals
2	Turkey	2	1	1	33	17	+16	Quarterfinals
3	Kyrgyzstan	2	0	2	7	42	−35	

Source: Konya 2021
Rules for classification: 1) Wins; 2) Head-to-head record; 3) Points scored.

13 August
14:00

Report

Kyrgyzstan	4–21	Azerbaijan

Karatay Congress and Sport Center Konya

13 August
21:00

Report

Turkey	21–3	Kyrgyzstan

Karatay Congress and Sport Center Konya

== Wrestling ==
Men's freestyle

Athlete	Event	Round of 16	Quarterfinal	Semifinal	Repesaj	Final / BM	
Athlete	Event	Opposition Result	Opposition Result	Opposition Result	Opposition Result	Opposition Result	Rank
Almaz Smanbekov	57 kg	Rzazade (AZE); W 13–4	Omar (SEN); W 10–0	Hikmatullo (TJK); W 13–2	—N/a	Abdullaev (UZB); L 0–10	2nd place, silver medalist(s)
Bekbolot Myrzanazar Uulu	61 kg	Bye	Dastan (IRI); L 4–9	did not advance			9
Ikromzhon Khadzhimurodov	65 kg	Bye	Jalolov (UZB); L 1–5	did not advance			8
Ernazar Akmataliev	70 kg	Orazow (TKM); W 12–2	Sharifov (TJK); W 11–0	Mammadaliyev (AZE); W 12–1	—N/a	Abozari (IRI); W 6–0	1st place, gold medalist(s)
Adilet Zhaparkulov	74 kg	Kaipanov (KAZ); L 0–5	did not advance				10
Arslan Budazhapov	79 kg	Ikromov (TJK); W 10–0	Omarov (AZE); L 4–4	did not advance			7
Nurtilek Karypbaev	86 kg	—N/a	Karimi (IRI); L 0–10	—N/a		Benferdjallah (ALG); W 3–3	3rd place, bronze medalist(s)
Mirlan Chynybekov	92 kg	—N/a	Butt (IRI); W4–0	Yaylacı (TUR); L 0–6	—N/a	Islomov (UZB); L 4–5	5
Baisal Kubatov	97 kg	Goleij (IRI); L 0–10	—N/a		Mahmadbekov (TJK); W 3–3	Ibragimov (KAZ); L 0–11	5

Athlete	Event	Group Stage				Semifinal	Final / BM	
Athlete	Event	Opposition Result	Opposition Result	Opposition Result	Rank	Opposition Result	Opposition Result	Rank
Arslanbek Turdubekov	125 kg	Hashemi (IRI); L 0-10	Rakhimov (UZB); L 1-1	Hamidli (AZE); L 1-3	3	did not advance		6

Men's Greco-Roman

Athlete	Event	Round of 16	Quarterfinal	Semifinal	Repesaj	Final / BM	
Athlete	Event	Opposition Result	Opposition Result	Opposition Result	Opposition Result	Opposition Result	Rank
Ulan Muratbek Uulu	55 kg	—N/a	Bekbolatov (KAZ); L 4–13	did not advance			7
Zholaman Sharshenbekov	60 kg	Bye	Yusupov (UZB); W 9–0	Arami (IRI); W 5–1	—N/a	Mammadov (AZE); W 10–2	1st place, gold medalist(s)
Tynar Sharshenbekov	63 kg	Bye	Abdeldjebar (ALG); W 9–1	Açilow (TKM); W 9–6	—N/a	Beheshtitala (IRI); L 2–4	2nd place, silver medalist(s)
Amantur Ismailov	67 kg	Bye	Bahja (MAR); W 9–0	Atabaev (UZB); W 9–0	—N/a	Jafarov (AZE); L 1–3	2nd place, silver medalist(s)
Bek Konurbaev	72 kg	—N/a	Noori (AFG); W 8–0	Ganizade (AZE); L 0–9	—N/a	Dağ (TUR); L 1–5	5
Akzhol Makhmudov	77 kg	Bye	Bayrak (TUR); W 9–0	Vardanyan (UZB); W 7–5	—N/a	Suleymanov (AZE); W 5–2	1st place, gold medalist(s)
Kalidin Asykeev	82 kg	Bye	Rasulov (UZB); W 6–0	Eid (JOR); W 5–1	—N/a	Huseynov (AZE); W 3–6	2nd place, silver medalist(s)
Uzur Dzhuzupbekov	97 kg	Boudjemline (ALG); W 7–1	Kürräýew (TKM); W 8–0	Bali (UZB); W 7–3		Assakalov (UZB); L 1–3	2nd place, silver medalist(s)

Athlete	Event	Group Stage				Semifinal	Final / BM	
Athlete	Event	Opposition Result	Opposition Result	Opposition Result	Rank	Opposition Result	Opposition Result	Rank
Atabek Azisbek	87 kg	Khasanov (TJK); W 4-2	Ahmadiyev (AZE); W 3-3	—N/a	1 Q	Taheri (UZB); L 1-1	Ahmadiyev (AZE); W 3-2	3rd place, bronze medalist(s)
Roman Kim	130 kg	Yousefi (IRI); L 4-6	Yıldırım (TUR); L 0-5	—N/a	3	did not advance		6

Women's freestyle

Athlete	Event	Round of 16	Quarterfinal	Semifinal	Repesaj	Final / BM	
Athlete	Event	Opposition Result	Opposition Result	Opposition Result	Opposition Result	Opposition Result	Rank
Aisuluu Tynybekova	62 kg	—N/a	Kuznetsova (KAZ); W 12-2	Goudiaby (SEN); W 10-0	—N/a	Camara (CMR); W 11-0	1st place, gold medalist(s)
Nurzat Nurtaeva	72 kg	Bye	Sambou (SEN); L 6-7	did not advance			7

Group Stage Format

Athlete	Event	Group Stage				Semifinal	Final / BM	
Athlete	Event	Opposition Result	Opposition Result	Opposition Result	Rank	Opposition Result	Opposition Result	Rank
Dilnaz Sazanova	65 kg	—N/a	Çakmak (TUR); W 10–0	Ngolle (CMR); W 6–5	1 Q	Shalygina (KAZ); L 1–12	Ngolle (CMR); W 8–2	3rd place, bronze medalist(s)
Meerim Zhumanazarova	68 kg	Esbergenova (UZB); W 8–4	Demir (TUR); W 10–0	Akter (BAN); W 10–0	1 Q	Egemberdiyeva (TKM); W 11–0	Bakbergenova (KAZ); W 11–0	1st place, gold medalist(s)
Aiperi Medet Kyzy	76 kg	—N/a	Youin (CIV); W 10–0	Hidayat (INA); W 10–0	1 Q	Gültekin (TUR); W 0–10	Youin (CIV); W 10–0	1st place, gold medalist(s)

== Weightlifting ==
Results

Athlete	Event	Snatch		Clean & Jerk		Total	Result
Athlete	Event	Result	Rank	Result	Rank	Total	Result
Ishimbek Muratbek Uulu	Men's -61kg	110	8	147	5	257	8
Emil Moldodosov	Men's -89kg	161	3rd place, bronze medalist(s)	193	3rd place, bronze medalist(s)	354	2nd place, silver medalist(s)
Bekdoolot Rasulbekov	Men's -102kg	169	4	216	3rd place, bronze medalist(s)	385	3rd place, bronze medalist(s)
Kanymzhan Almazbek Kyzy	Women's -87kg	76	3rd place, bronze medalist(s)	95	3rd place, bronze medalist(s)	171	3rd place, bronze medalist(s)
