= Tajikistan at the Islamic Solidarity Games =

- IOC code: TJK
- NOC: NOCRT
- Medals Ranked 30th: Gold 1 Silver 4 Bronze 9 Total 14

Islamic Solidarity Games appearances (overview)
- 2005; 2013; 2017; 2021; 2025

Tajikistan has competed at every celebration of the Islamic Solidarity Games since the first edition in Mecca. As of the last tournament held in 2021 in Konya, Turkey, the Tajiks athletes have won a total of 14 medals (1 gold, 4 silver, and 9 bronze).

== Medal tables ==
=== Medals by Islamic Solidarity Games ===
Host nation

Below the table representing all Tajiks medals in the games. Till now, Tajikistan has won 14 medals of which 1 gold, 4 silver, and 9 bronze.

Games	Athletes	Gold	Silver	Bronze	Total	Rank	Notes	RF
(Saudi Arabia) 2005 Mecca		1	1	0	2	19	details	
(Iran) 2010 Tehran	Canceled							
(Indonesia) 2013 Palembang		0	0	0	0	—	details	
(Azerbaijan) 2017 Baku		0	0	4	4	36	details	
(Turkey) 2021 Konya		0	3	5	8	29	details	
(Saudi Arabia) 2025 Riyadh							details	
(Malaysia) 2029 Selangor	Future event							
Total		1	4	9	14	30th	―	―

== See also ==
- Tajikistan at the Olympics
- Tajikistan at the Paralympics
- Tajikistan at the Asian Games
- Sports in Tajikistan
