= Telman Valiyev =

Azerbaijani judoka (born 1994)

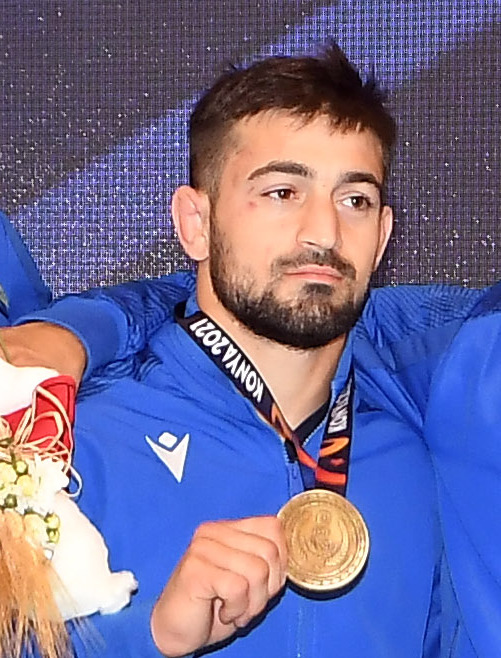

Personal information
- Born: 25 April 1994 (age 32)
- Occupation: Judoka

Sport
- Country: Azerbaijan
- Sport: Judo
- Weight class: ‍–‍73 kg

Achievements and titles
- European Champ.: R32 (2020)
Medal record
Men's judo
Representing Azerbaijan
IJF Grand Slam
Bronze medal – third place	2019 Baku	‍–‍73 kg
IJF Grand Prix
Bronze medal – third place	2017 Tashkent	‍–‍73 kg
Bronze medal – third place	2019 Budapest	‍–‍73 kg
Islamic Solidarity Games
Gold medal – first place	2021 Konya	Men's team
Bronze medal – third place	2021 Konya	‍–‍73 kg
European U23 Championships
Bronze medal – third place	2015 Bratislava	‍–‍66 kg

Profile at external databases
- IJF: 17062
- JudoInside.com: 75683
- Updated on 21 November 2022

Telman Valiyev (born 25 April 1994) is an Azerbaijani judoka.

Valiyev is a bronze medalist from the 2019 Judo Grand Slam Baku in the ‍–‍73 kg category.
