= Nigeria at the 2021 Islamic Solidarity Games =

- IOC code: NGR
- NOC: Nigeria Olympic Committee

in Konya, Turkey
- Competitors: 12
- Medals: Gold 1 Silver 3 Bronze 1 Total 5

Islamic Solidarity Games appearances (overview)
- 2005; 2013; 2017; 2021; 2025

Nigeria participated in the 2021 Islamic Solidarity Games held in Konya, Turkey from 9 to 18 August 2022.

The games had been rescheduled several times. In May 2021, the ISSF postponed the event to August 2022 citing the COVID-19 pandemic situation in the participating countries.

== Medalists ==
Medal	Name	Sport	Event	Date
Gold	Odunayo Adekuoroye	Wrestling	Women's freestyle 59 kg	13 August
Silver	Esther Kolawole	Wrestling	Women's freestyle 57 kg	13 August
Silver	Adijat Olarinoye	Weightlifting	Women's 59 kg snatch	12 August
Silver	Adijat Olarinoye	Weightlifting	Women's 59 kg total	12 August
Bronze	Adijat Olarinoye	Weightlifting	Women's 59 kg Clean & Jerk	12 August

Medals by sport
Sport	1st place, gold medalist(s)	2nd place, silver medalist(s)	3rd place, bronze medalist(s)	Total
Weightlifting	0	2	1	3
Wrestling	1	1	0	2
Total	1	3	1	5

== Athletics ==
Track Events

Athlete	Event	Heats		Semifinal		Final	
Athlete	Event	Time	Rank	Time	Rank	Time	Rank
Gracious Junior Ushie	Men's 100 metres	10.13	12 q	10.44	16	did not advance	
Uruemu Idjesa	Men's 100 metres	10.39	21 Q	DNS		did not advance	
Masoud Kamran	Men's 400 metres	47.92	12	did not advance			
Iyanuoluwa Toyin Bada	Women's 100 metres	11.37	8 q	11.66	8 q	11.60	8
Balikis Temitope Yakubu	Women's 100 metres	11.43	10 Q	11.69	10	did not advance	
Iyanuoluwa Toyin Bada	Women's 200 metres	24.57	10 Q	DNS		did not advance	
Balikis Temitope Yakubu	Women's 200 metres	24.16	12 q	24.22	11	did not advance	
Sarah Ochigbo	Women's 400 metres	DNS		did not advance			
Sarah Ochigbo	Women's 400 metres hurdles	—N/a				1:00.15	4

== Weightlifting ==
Results

Athlete	Event	Snatch		Clean & Jerk		Total	Result
Athlete	Event	Result	Rank	Result	Rank	Total	Result
Patrick Olawale Barde	Men's -102kg	140	10	165	10	305	10
Adijat Adenike Olarinoye	Women's -59kg	92	2nd place, silver medalist(s)	110	3rd place, bronze medalist(s)	202	2nd place, silver medalist(s)

== Wrestling ==
Group Stage Format

Athlete	Event	Group Stage				Semifinal	Final / BM	
Athlete	Event	Opposition Result	Opposition Result	Opposition Result	Rank	Opposition Result	Opposition Result	Rank
Esther Kolawole	57 kg	—N/a	Kamaloğlu (TUR); W 10–0	Bousetta (TUN); W 11–7	1 Q	Almagambetova (KAZ); W 11–0	Aliyeva (AZE); L 6–14	2nd place, silver medalist(s)

Nordic Format

Athlete	Event	Nordic Round Robin				Rank
Athlete	Event	Opposition Result	Opposition Result	Opposition Result	Opposition Result	Rank
Odunayo Adekuoroye	59 kg	Çelik (TUR); W 4–0	Bekesh (KAZ); W 10–0	Kolesnik (AZE); W 3–1	Aimbetova (UZB); W 10–0	1st place, gold medalist(s)
