= Cumhuriyet Football Field =

Football stadium in Konya, Turkey

Coordinates: 37°55′50″N 32°29′57″E

Cumhuriyet Football Field (Turkish: Cumhuriyet Futbol Sahası) is a football stadium in Konya, Turkey.

Cumhuriyet Football Field is located in the Malazgirt neighborhood of Selçuklu disyricy in Konya, Turkey. The venue hosted the qualification matches of the football competitions at the 2021 Islamic Solidarity Games.
