= Aishath Himna Hassan =

Maldivian athletics competitor

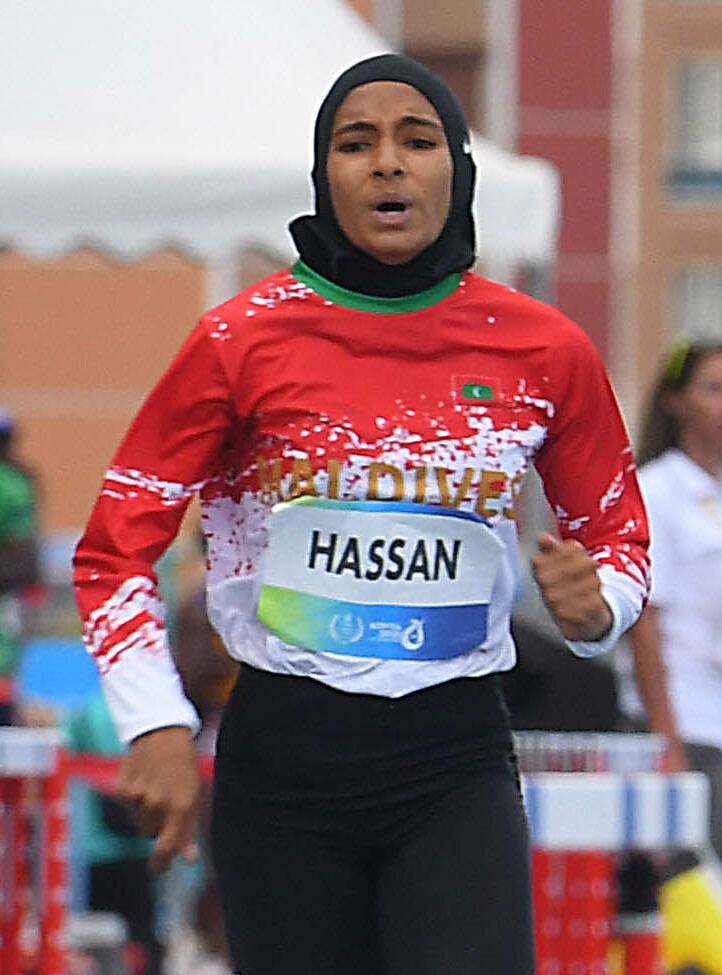
- Aishath Himna Hassan in 2021

Personal information
- Born: 7 January 2002 (age 24) Maldives

Sport
- Sport: Sprinting

Aishath Himna Hassan (Dhivehi: އައިޝަތު ހިމްނާ ހަސަން; born 7 January 2002) is a track and field athlete from the Maldives who specializes in sprinting.

== Sports career ==
Aishath Himna Hassan gained her first international experience at the 2018 Asian Junior Athletics Championships, in Gifu, Japan where she was eliminated in the first round of the 200-meter race with a time of 26.73 seconds, as well as in the 400-meter race with a time of 59.76 seconds. She competed in the 400-meter race at the 2018 IAAF World U20 Championships in Tampere, where she was also eliminated in the first round with a time of 59.76 seconds. At the end of August, she participated in the Asian Games in Jakarta for the first time, where she was eliminated in the preliminary rounds in both events with times of 26.73 seconds and 60.59 seconds. The following year, she was eliminated in the preliminary round of the Asian Youth Championships in Hong Kong with times of 26.86 s and 59.18 s. However, in October, she received a wildcard for the 400 meters at the World Championships in Doha, Qatar where she was eliminated in the first round with a time of 59.51 s. In December, she finished sixth in the 4 x 100-meter relay at the South Asian Games in Kathmandu with a time of 50.16 s and also finished sixth in the 4 x 400-meter relay with a time of 4:31.22 min. In 2021, she competed in the 400 meters at the U20 World Championships in Nairobi, where she was eliminated in the first round with a time of 58.90 s. The following year, at the 2022 Commonwealth Games in Birmingham, she failed to advance past the preliminary round of the 100 metres dash with a time of 12.17 seconds and was also eliminated in the 400-meter heats with a time of 58.70 seconds. She then finished seventh in the 400-meter race at the Islamic Solidarity Games in Konya, Turkey with a time of 58.84 seconds and missed the final in the 200-meter race with a time of 24.66 seconds. She also finished fourth in the 4x100-meter relay with a time of 48.21 seconds.

In 2023, she was eliminated from the 400-meter preliminary heats at the Asian Games in Hangzhou with a time of 56.66 seconds and missed the final in the 200-meter event with a time of 25.59 seconds. She also finished sixth in the 4 x 100-meter relay with a time of 47.54 seconds.

In 2021 and 2022, Hassan became Maldivian champion in the 100, 200 and 400 meters.

In 2024, she was awarded Bank of Maldives (BML) Sports Scholarship.

== Personal best times ==
- 100 metres: 12.17 s (+1.4 m/s), August 2, 2022 in Birmingham (Maldivian record)
- 200 metres: 24.90 s (+0.6 m/s), August 26, 2022 in Malé (Maldivian record)
- 400 metres: 56.24 s, June 24, 2023, in Kingston (Maldivian record)
