= Maldives at the 2021 Islamic Solidarity Games =

- IOC code: MDV
- NOC: Maldives Olympic Committee

in Konya, Turkey
- Medals: Gold 0 Silver 0 Bronze 1 Total 1

Islamic Solidarity Games appearances
- 2005; 2013; 2017; 2021; 2025

The Maldives participated in the 2021 Islamic Solidarity Games held in Konya, Turkey from 9 to 18 August 2022.

The games had been rescheduled several times. In May 2021, the ISSF postponed the event to August 2022 citing the COVID-19 pandemic situation in the participating countries.

== Medalists ==
| Medal | Name | Sport | Event | Date |
|---|---|---|---|---|
| Bronze | Fathimath Dheema Ali, Malaak Binthi Muizzu, Aishath Rafa Nazim | Table tennis | Women’s teams | 11 August |

Medals by sport
| Sport | 1st place, gold medalist(s) | 2nd place, silver medalist(s) | 3rd place, bronze medalist(s) | Total |
| Archery | 0 | 0 | 0 | 0 |
| Athletics | 0 | 0 | 0 | 0 |
| Bocce | 0 | 0 | 0 | 0 |
| Gymnastics | 0 | 0 | 0 | 0 |
| Karate | 0 | 0 | 0 | 0 |
| Swimming | 0 | 0 | 0 | 0 |
| Table tennis | 0 | 0 | 1 | 1 |
| Volleyball | 0 | 0 | 0 | 0 |
| Weightlifting | 0 | 0 | 0 | 0 |
| Wrestling | 0 | 0 | 0 | 0 |
| Total | 0 | 0 | 1 | 1 |

== Basketball ==
=== Men's 3x3 tournament ===
Group B

| Pos | Team | Pld | W | L | PF | PA | PD | Qualification |
|---|---|---|---|---|---|---|---|---|
| 1 | Iran | 4 | 4 | 0 | 84 | 41 | +43 | Quarterfinals |
| 2 | Uganda | 4 | 3 | 1 | 67 | 56 | +11 | Quarterfinals |
| 3 | Guyana | 4 | 2 | 2 | 67 | 68 | −1 | |
| 4 | Mauritania | 4 | 1 | 3 | 64 | 65 | −1 | |
| 5 | Maldives | 4 | 0 | 4 | 32 | 84 | −52 | |

Source: Konya 2021
Rules for classification: 1) Wins; 2) Head-to-head record; 3) Points scored.

14 August
16:00

| Maldives | 7–20 | Uganda |

Karatay Congress and Sport Center

14 August
16:00

| Maldives | 4–21 | Iran |

Karatay Congress and Sport Center

16 August
15:05

| Mauritania | 21–9 | Maldives |

Karatay Congress and Sport Center

16 August
20:25

| Guyana | 22–12 | Maldives |

Karatay Congress and Sport Center
