= Bahrain at the 2021 Islamic Solidarity Games =

- IOC code: BHR
- NOC: Bahrain Olympic Committee

in Konya, Turkey
- Competitors: 49
- Medals: Gold 9 Silver 7 Bronze 7 Total 23

Islamic Solidarity Games appearances
- 2005; 2013; 2017; 2021; 2025

Bahrain participated in the 2021 Islamic Solidarity Games held in Konya, Turkey from 9 to 18 August 2022.

The games had been rescheduled several times. In May 2021, the ISSF postponed the event to August 2022 citing the COVID-19 pandemic situation in the participating countries.

== Medalists ==
Medal	Name	Sport	Event	Date
Gold	Birhanu Balew	Athletics	Men's 5000 m	8 August
Silver	Bontu Rebitu	Athletics	Women's 10000 m	8 August
Bronze	Ruth Jebet	Athletics	Women's 10000 m	8 August
Bronze	Abdelrahman Mahmoud	Athletics	Men's shot put	8 August

Medals by sport
Sport	1st place, gold medalist(s)	2nd place, silver medalist(s)	3rd place, bronze medalist(s)	Total
Athletics	8	7	4	19
Cycling	1	0	0	1
Judo	0	0	2	2
Shooting	0	0	1	1
Total	9	7	7	23

== Weightlifting ==
Results

Athlete	Event	Snatch		Clean & Jerk		Total	Result
Athlete	Event	Result	Rank	Result	Rank	Total	Result
Zainab Yahya	Women's -64kg	72	7	X	-	X	-
