= Togo at the 2021 Islamic Solidarity Games =

- IOC code: TOG
- NOC: Togolese National Olympic Committee

in Konya, Turkey
- Competitors: 9
- Medals: Gold 0 Silver 1 Bronze 0 Total 1

Islamic Solidarity Games appearances
- 2005; 2013; 2017; 2021; 2025

Togo participated in the 2021 Islamic Solidarity Games held in Konya, Turkey from 9 to 18 August 2022.

The games had been rescheduled several times. In May 2021, the ISSF postponed the event to August 2022 citing the COVID-19 pandemic situation in the participating countries.

== Medalists ==
Medal	Name	Sport	Event	Date
2nd place, silver medalist(s)	Naomi Akakpo	Athletics	Women's 100m Hurdles	11 August 2022

Medals by sport
Sport	1st place, gold medalist(s)	2nd place, silver medalist(s)	3rd place, bronze medalist(s)	Total
Athletics	0	1	0	1
