= Oman at the 2021 Islamic Solidarity Games =

- IOC code: OMA
- NOC: Oman Olympic Committee

in Konya, Turkey
- Competitors: 30
- Medals: Gold 1 Silver 1 Bronze 2 Total 4

Islamic Solidarity Games appearances
- 2005; 2013; 2017; 2021; 2025

Oman participated in the 2021 Islamic Solidarity Games held in Konya, Turkey from 9 to 18 August 2022.

The games had been rescheduled several times. In May 2021, the ISSF postponed the event to August 2022 citing the COVID-19 pandemic situation in the participating countries.

== Medalists ==
Medal	Name	Sport	Event	Date

Medals by sport
Sport	1st place, gold medalist(s)	2nd place, silver medalist(s)	3rd place, bronze medalist(s)	Total
Athletics	1	0	2	3
Weightlifting	0	1	0	1
Total	1	1	2	4

== Wrestling ==
Athlete	Event	Snatch		Clean & Jerk		Total	Result
Athlete	Event	Result	Rank	Result	Rank	Total	Result
Amur Khanjari	-81kg	156	6	194	2nd place, silver medalist(s)	350	4
Elyas Al Busaidi							
