= Mohammad Hossein Abareghi =

Iranian sprinter (born 1995)

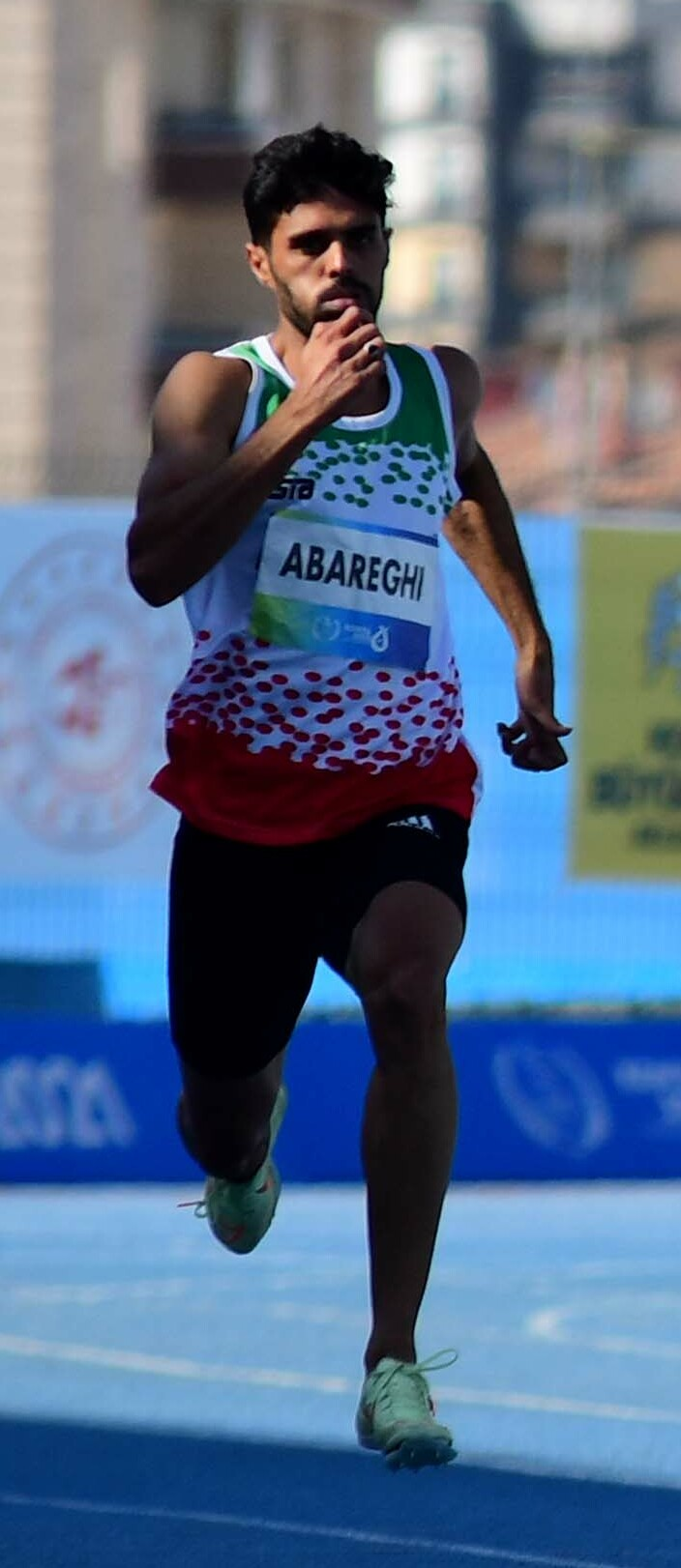
- Mohammad Hossein Abareghi in 2022

Personal information
- Born: 5 January 1995 (age 31)

Sport
- Country: Iran
- Sport: Track and field
- Event: sprinter
- Updated on 29 August 2015

Mohammad Hossein Abareghi (Persian: محمدحسین ابارقی; born 5 January 1995) is an Iranian sprinter. He failed a doping test for the steroid stanozolol, and was banned from the sport for four years, beginning in August 2015.

== Biography ==
During the Asian Junior Championships on 13 June 2014, he beat his 100m record of 10.50 seconds. He also broke the senior national record in the 200 meters at 20.63. On 25 July 2015, he broke his national record in 200 m at 20.47. At the 2015 World Championships in Athletics in Beijing, China he was on the startlist of the 200 metres event but did not start.

== See also ==
- Iran at the 2015 World Championships in Athletics
