= 2021 Islamic Solidarity Games =

Multi-sport competition held in Konya, Turkey

5th Islamic Solidarity Games
- Host city: Konya
- Country: Turkey
- Motto: Unity is Strength (Turkish: "Birlik Güçtür")
- Nations: 55
- Athletes: 4200
- Events: 380 in 19 Sports
- Opening: 9 August 2022
- Closing: 18 August 2022
- Opened by: President Recep Tayyip Erdoğan
- Athlete's Oath: Öznur Cüre
- Judge's Oath: Serkan Karademir
- Main venue: Konya Metropolitan Stadium
- Website: konya2021.com

‌The 2021 Islamic Solidarity Games (Turkish: 2021 İslami Dayanışma Oyunları) were the 5th edition of the event held from 9 to 18 August 2022 at Konya, Turkey under the aegis of Islamic Solidarity Sports Federation (ISSF). It was the first time in history that the event was organised by the Turkish Olympic Committee.

Formerly scheduled to take place from 20 to 29 August 2021, the event was postponed to be held from 10 to 19 September 2021 in July 2020 by the ISSF because the original dates were coinciding with the 2020 Summer Olympics, which were postponed due to the COVID-19 pandemic. In May 2021, the ISSF postponed the event to August 2022 citing the COVID-19 pandemic situation in the participating countries.

== Logo Design ==
The logo for the 2021 Islamic Solidarity Games in Konya was designed by Cafer Sadık Şahin. The pictograms representing the sports disciplines were also designed by Cafer Sadık Şahin, referencing the Çatalhöyük (7500 BC) excavation site in Konya .

== Bidding ==
On 22 / 23 December 2016, the Turkish Olympic Committee submitted its bid for 2021 Islamic Solidarity Games during a Coordination Meeting with Islamic Solidarity Sports Federation held at the country.

On 13 April 2017, Istanbul was awarded the event during the 25th ISSF Executive Board meeting held at Baku, Azerbaijan. In December 2019, Turkey requested to change the host city from Istanbul to Konya, which was subsequently approved by the ISSF. The host city contract was signed in a meeting on 19 December 2019 in Ankara, Turkey.

== Venues ==
| Venue Name | Sports |
|---|---|
| 19 May Sports Hall | Taekwondo, Fencing |
| Cumhuriyet Football Field | Football |
| Karatay Congress and Sport Center | Volleyball, Basketball, 3×3 Karate |
| Konya Metropolitan Municipality Stadium | Football, Ceremonies |
| Konya Olympic Swimming Pool | Swimming, Para Swimming |
| Konya Athletic Field | Athletics, Para Athletics |
| Konya Technical University Sports Hall | Judo, Wrestling |
| Konya Velodrome | Artistic Gymnastics, Rhythmic Gymnastics, Cycling Track |
| Selcuk University 15 July Stadium | Football |
| Selçuklu Municipality International Sports Hall | Handball, Kickboxing |
| Saraçoğlu Sport Complex | Shooting, Para Shooting, Archery, Para Archery, Traditional Turkish Archery |
| TÜYAP Konya International Fair Center | Table Tennis, Para Table Teniis, Weightlifting, Bocce |

== Sports ==
In October 2019, Organizing Committee in cooperation with Islamic Solidarity Sports Federation (ISSF) announced following 24 disciplines from 21 sports to be contested in this edition of Islamic Solidarity Games. Some sports also included their paralympic counterpart as athletics, judo, swimming and weightlifting. In March 2022, the final program was announced with 22 disciplines from 19 sports including 4 para sports. In relation with the program from 5 years early, the organizers choose to remove 6 sports: water polo, diving, field hockey, tennis, wushu and zurkhaneh. At their place they choose to add archery, boccia, fencing and kickboxing. At the paralympic events parapowerlifiting and blind judo was dropped and their place was added para table tennis and para archery. Along this events, in archery was included 4 extra events with the Traditional Turkish Archery discipline.

2021 Islamic Solidarity Games sports programme
- Aquatics
  - Swimming (61)
- Archery (25)
- Athletics (43)
- 3x3 basketball (2)
- Bocce (10)
- Cycling (12)
  - Track cycling (8)
  - Road cycling (4)
- Fencing (12)
- Football (1)
- Gymnastics
  - Aerobic gymnastics (5)
  - Artistic gymnastics (14)
  - Rhythmic gymnastics (8)
- Handball (2)
- Judo (16)
- Karate (14)
- Kickboxing (31)
- Shooting (6)
- Table tennis (11)
- Taekwondo (16)
- Volleyball (2)
- Weightlifting (60)
- Wrestling (30)

== Schedule ==
The Games were originally scheduled to take place from 20 to 29 August 2021 in Konya, Turkey. In May 2020, the Islamic Solidarity Sports Federation (ISSF), who are responsible for the direction and control of the Islamic Solidarity Games, postponed the games as the 2020 Summer Olympics were postponed to July and August 2021, due to the global COVID-19 pandemic.

| OC | Opening ceremony | ● | Event competitions | 1 | Event finals | CC | Closing ceremony |

| August | 5 Fri | 6 Sat | 7 Sun | 8 Mon | 9 Tue | 10 Wed | 11 Thu | 12 Fri | 13 Sat | 14 Sun | 15 Mon | 16 Tue | 17 Wed | 18 Thu | Events |
|---|---|---|---|---|---|---|---|---|---|---|---|---|---|---|---|
| Ceremonies | | | | | OC | | | | | | | | | CC | |
| Archery | | | | | | | | 5 | 6 | | 2 | 2 | 6 | 4 | 25 |
| Athletics | | | | 6 | 8 | 8 | 11 | 9 | | | | | | | 43 |
| 3x3 basketball | | | | | | | | | ● | ● | ● | ● | 2 | | 2 |
| Bocce | | | | | ● | ● | ● | 10 | | | | | | | 10 |
| Cycling | 2 | 2 | 2 | 2 | | | 2 | | 2 | | | | | | 12 |
| Fencing | | | | | | | | | | 2 | 3 | 3 | 4 | | 12 |
| Football | | | | ● | | ● | | ● | | ● | | 1 | | | 1 |
| Gymnastics | | | | | ● | 2 | 6 | | ● | 8 | | | 2 | 4 | 27 |
| Handball | | | ● | ● | ● | ● | ● | ● | ● | 2 | | | | | 2 |
| Judo | | | | | | | | | | | 7 | 7 | 2 | | 16 |
| Karate | | | | | | | | | | | | | 7 | 7 | 14 |
| Kickboxing | | | | | | | | | | | | 4 | 10 | 17 | 31 |
| Shooting | | | | | ● | ● | 2 | 1 | ● | ● | 2 | 1 | | | 6 |
| Swimming | | | 5 | 4 | 4 | 4 | 4 | | 7 | 8 | 8 | 9 | 8 | | 61 |
| Table tennis | | | ● | 2 | ● | ● | 2 | | ● | 4 | 3 | | | | 11 |
| Taekwondo | | | | | 4 | 4 | 4 | 4 | | | | | | | 16 |
| Volleyball | | | | ● | ● | ● | ● | ● | ● | ● | 2 | | | | 2 |
| Weightlifting | | | | | | | 9 | 12 | 9 | 15 | 15 | | | | 60 |
| Wrestling | | | | | | 7 | 8 | 8 | 7 | | | | | | 30 |
| Daily medal events | 2 | 2 | 7 | 14 | 16 | 25 | 48 | 49 | 25 | 39 | 42 | 27 | 41 | 32 | 381 |
| Cumulative total | 2 | 4 | 11 | 25 | 41 | 66 | 114 | 163 | 188 | 227 | 269 | 296 | 337 | | 381 |
| August 2022 | 5 Fri | 6 Sat | 7 Sun | 8 Mon | 9 Tue | 10 Wed | 11 Thu | 12 Fri | 13 Sat | 14 Sun | 15 Mon | 16 Tue | 17 Wed | 18 Thu | Total events |

== Participating nations ==
It is expected that the 55 members of the Islamic Solidarity Sports Federation will present at the Games. In May 2022, Egypt announced it will not send athletes. In July 2022, Iraq withdrew from participation.

Below is a list of all the participating NOCs; the number of competitors per delegation is indicated in brackets.

Participating National Committees
- Afghanistan (48)
- Albania (16)
- Algeria (147)
- Azerbaijan (275)
- Bahrain (49)
- Bangladesh (42)
- Benin (5)
- Brunei (10)
- Burkina Faso (7)
- Cameroon (139)
- Chad (43)
- Comoros (9)
- Djibouti (19)
- Gabon (15)
- The Gambia (25)
- Guinea (15)
- Guinea-Bissau (10)
- Guyana (18)
- Indonesia (82)
- Iran (253)
- Ivory Coast (10)
- Jordan (58)
- Kazakhstan (125)
- Kuwait (61)
- Kyrgyzstan (112)
- Lebanon (34)
- Libya (3)
- Malaysia (56)
- Maldives (36)
- Mali (17)
- Mauritania (13)
- Morocco (185)
- Mozambique (11)
- Niger (11)
- Nigeria (12)
- Oman (30)
- Pakistan (114)
- Palestine (32)
- Qatar (125)
- Saudi Arabia (134)
- Senegal (128)
- Sierra Leone (23)
- Somalia (4)
- Sudan (67)
- Suriname (12)
- Syria (1)
- Tajikistan (61)
- Togo (9)
- Tunisia (20)
- Turkey (462) (host)
- Turkmenistan (103)
- Uganda (42)
- United Arab Emirates (57)
- Uzbekistan (265)
- Yemen (25)

== Medal table ==
* Host nation (Turkey)

2021 Islamic Solidarity Games medal table
| Rank | Nation | Gold | Silver | Bronze | Total |
|---|---|---|---|---|---|
| 1 | Turkey (TUR)* | 145 | 107 | 89 | 341 |
| 2 | Uzbekistan (UZB) | 51 | 42 | 65 | 158 |
| 3 | Iran (IRI) | 39 | 44 | 50 | 133 |
| 4 | Azerbaijan (AZE) | 29 | 36 | 34 | 99 |
| 5 | Kazakhstan (KAZ) | 27 | 23 | 39 | 89 |
| 6 | Morocco (MAR) | 15 | 13 | 34 | 62 |
| 7 | Indonesia (INA) | 13 | 14 | 29 | 56 |
| 8 | Bahrain (BHR) | 9 | 7 | 7 | 23 |
| 9 | Kyrgyzstan (KGZ) | 8 | 8 | 15 | 31 |
| 10 | Algeria (ALG) | 7 | 12 | 23 | 42 |
| 11 | Kuwait (KUW) | 5 | 9 | 2 | 16 |
| 12 | Turkmenistan (TKM) | 4 | 6 | 13 | 23 |
| 13 | Qatar (QAT) | 4 | 3 | 5 | 12 |
| 14 | United Arab Emirates (UAE) | 3 | 2 | 5 | 10 |
| 15 | Saudi Arabia (KSA) | 2 | 12 | 10 | 24 |
| 16 | Cameroon (CMR) | 2 | 6 | 5 | 13 |
| 17 | Uganda (UGA) | 2 | 5 | 2 | 9 |
| 18 | Jordan (JOR) | 2 | 4 | 6 | 12 |
| 19 | Malaysia (MAS) | 2 | 1 | 4 | 7 |
| 20 | The Gambia (GAM) | 2 | 0 | 0 | 2 |
| 21 | Nigeria (NGR) | 1 | 3 | 1 | 5 |
| 22 | Senegal (SEN) | 1 | 1 | 5 | 7 |
| 23 | Ivory Coast (CIV) | 1 | 1 | 3 | 5 |
| 24 | Oman (OMN) | 1 | 1 | 2 | 4 |
| 25 | Libya (LBA) | 1 | 0 | 3 | 4 |
| 26 | Burkina Faso (BUR) | 1 | 0 | 1 | 2 |
| 26 | Niger (NIG) | 1 | 0 | 1 | 2 |
| 28 | Pakistan (PAK) | 1 | 0 | 0 | 1 |
| 29 | Tajikistan (TJK) | 0 | 3 | 5 | 8 |
| 30 | Sudan (SUD) | 0 | 2 | 1 | 3 |
| 31 | Tunisia (TUN) | 0 | 1 | 6 | 7 |
| 32 | Lebanon (LBN) | 0 | 1 | 3 | 4 |
| 33 | Bangladesh (BAN) | 0 | 1 | 2 | 3 |
| 33 | Palestine (PLE) | 0 | 1 | 2 | 3 |
| 35 | Djibouti (DJI) | 0 | 1 | 1 | 2 |
| 36 | Albania (ALB) | 0 | 1 | 0 | 1 |
| 36 | Guinea (GUI) | 0 | 1 | 0 | 1 |
| 36 | Mali (MLI) | 0 | 1 | 0 | 1 |
| 36 | Togo (TOG) | 0 | 1 | 0 | 1 |
| 40 | Yemen (YEM) | 0 | 0 | 2 | 2 |
| 41 | Benin (BEN) | 0 | 0 | 1 | 1 |
| 41 | Guinea-Bissau (GBS) | 0 | 0 | 1 | 1 |
| 41 | Maldives (MDV) | 0 | 0 | 1 | 1 |
| 41 | Sierra Leone (SLE) | 0 | 0 | 1 | 1 |
| Totals (44 entries) | | 379 | 374 | 479 | 1,232 |
