= The Gambia at the 2021 Islamic Solidarity Games =

- IOC code: GAM
- NOC: Gambia National Olympic Committee

in Konya, Turkey
- Medals: Gold 0 Silver 0 Bronze 0 Total 0

Islamic Solidarity Games appearances
- 2005; 2013; 2017; 2021; 2025

The Gambia participated in the 2021 Islamic Solidarity Games held in Konya, Turkey from 9 to 18 August 2022.

The games had been rescheduled several times. In May 2021, the ISSF postponed the event to August 2022 citing the COVID-19 pandemic situation in the participating countries.

== Medalists ==
| Medal | Name | Sport | Event | Date |

Medals by sport
| Sport | 1st place, gold medalist(s) | 2nd place, silver medalist(s) | 3rd place, bronze medalist(s) | Total |
| Archery | 0 | 0 | 0 | 0 |
| Athletics | 0 | 0 | 0 | 0 |
| Bocce | 0 | 0 | 0 | 0 |
| Gymnastics | 0 | 0 | 0 | 0 |
| Karate | 0 | 0 | 0 | 0 |
| Swimming | 0 | 0 | 0 | 0 |
| Taekwondo | 0 | 0 | 0 | 0 |
| Volleyball | 0 | 0 | 0 | 0 |
| Weightlifting | 0 | 0 | 0 | 0 |
| Wrestling | 0 | 0 | 0 | 0 |
| Total | 0 | 0 | 0 | 0 |

== Basketball ==
=== Women's 3x3 tournament ===
Group A

| Pos | Team | Pld | W | L | PF | PA | PD | Qualification |
|---|---|---|---|---|---|---|---|---|
| 1 | Qatar | 0 | 0 | 0 | 0 | 0 | 0 | Quarterfinals |
| 2 | Uganda | 0 | 0 | 0 | 0 | 0 | 0 | Quarterfinals |
| 3 | Saudi Arabia | 0 | 0 | 0 | 0 | 0 | 0 | 9–12th place semifinals |
| 4 | Gambia | 0 | 0 | 0 | 0 | 0 | 0 | |

Source: Konya 2021
Rules for classification: 1) Wins; 2) Head-to-head record; 3) Points scored.
