= Sudan at the 2021 Islamic Solidarity Games =

- IOC code: SUD
- NOC: Sudan Olympic Committee

in Konya, Turkey
- Medals: Gold 0 Silver 2 Bronze 1 Total 3

Islamic Solidarity Games appearances
- 2005; 2013; 2017; 2021; 2025

Sudan participated in the 2021 Islamic Solidarity Games held in Konya, Turkey, from 9 to 18 August 2022. The games had been rescheduled multiple times. In May 2021, the ISSF postponed the event to August 2022 citing the COVID-19 pandemic situation in the participating countries.

== Medalists ==
Medal	Name	Sport	Event	Date

Medals by sport
Sport	1st place, gold medalist(s)	2nd place, silver medalist(s)	3rd place, bronze medalist(s)	Total
Athletics	0	1	0	1
Swimming	0	1	1	2
Total	0	2	1	3

== Weightlifting ==
Results

Athlete	Event	Snatch		Clean & Jerk		Total	Result
Athlete	Event	Result	Rank	Result	Rank	Total	Result
Nasreldien Adam	Men's -81kg	84	16	100	16	184	16
Salah Hamed	Men's -96kg	96	6	110	6	206	6
Hoida Suliman	Women's -76kg	42	7	55	7	97	7
Zikryat Khojali	Women's -87kg	45	4	55	4	100	4

== Volleyball ==
=== Men's tournament ===
Pool A

Pos	Team	Pld	W	L	Pts	SW	SL	SR	SPW	SPL	SPR	Qualification
1	Cameroon	3	2	1	7	8	3	2.667	255	220	1.159	Semifinals
2	Azerbaijan	3	2	1	6	6	4	1.500	232	220	1.055	Semifinals
3	Morocco	3	2	1	5	7	5	1.400	272	246	1.106	
4	Sudan	3	0	3	0	0	9	0.000	152	225	0.676	

Source: TVF

Date	Time		Score		Set 1	Set 2	Set 3	Set 4	Set 5	Total	Report
9 Aug	10:00	Sudan	0–3	Azerbaijan	13–25	20–25	22–25			55–75	Report
11 Aug	13:00	Sudan	0–3	Morocco	14–25	13–25	14–25			41–75	Report
13 Aug	10:00	Sudan	0–3	Cameroon	17–25	22–25	17–25			56–75	Report
