= Mozambique at the 2021 Islamic Solidarity Games =

- IOC code: MOZ
- NOC: National Olympic Committee of Mozambique

in Konya, Turkey
- Competitors: 11
- Medals: Gold 0 Silver 0 Bronze 0 Total 0

Islamic Solidarity Games appearances
- 2005; 2013; 2017; 2021; 2025

Mozambique participated in the 2021 Islamic Solidarity Games held in Konya, Turkey from 9 to 18 August 2022.

The games had been rescheduled several times. In May 2021, the ISSF postponed the event to August 2022 citing the COVID-19 pandemic situation in the participating countries.

== Medalists ==
Medal	Name	Sport	Event	Date

Medals by sport
Sport	1st place, gold medalist(s)	2nd place, silver medalist(s)	3rd place, bronze medalist(s)	Total
Archery	0	0	0	0
Athletics	0	0	0	0
Karate	0	0	0	0
Taekwondo	0	0	0	0
Weightlifting	0	0	0	0
Wrestling	0	0	0	0
Total	0	0	0	0
