= Tajikistan at the 2021 Islamic Solidarity Games =

- IOC code: TJK
- NOC: National Olympic Committee of the Republic of Tajikistan

in Konya, Turkey
- Competitors: 61
- Medals: Gold 0 Silver 3 Bronze 5 Total 8

Islamic Solidarity Games appearances (overview)
- 2005; 2013; 2017; 2021; 2025

Tajikistan participated in the 2021 Islamic Solidarity Games held in Konya, Turkey from 9 to 18 August 2022.

The games had been rescheduled several times. In May 2021, the ISSF postponed the event to August 2022 citing the COVID-19 pandemic situation in the participating countries.

== Medalists ==
Medal	Name	Sport	Event	Date
Silver	Ildar Akhmadiev	Athletics	Men's long jump	12 August
Silver	Ekaterina Ishchenko	Para table tennis	Women's Class 10 Individual	14 August
Bronze	Aslam Azizov	Wrestling	Men's Greco-Roman 55 kg	12 August
Bronze	Firuz Mirzorajabov	Wrestling	Men's Greco-Roman 63 kg	12 August

Medals by sport
Sport	1st place, gold medalist(s)	2nd place, silver medalist(s)	3rd place, bronze medalist(s)	Total
Athletics	0	1	0	1
Judo	0	1	3	4
Para table tennis	0	1	0	1
Wrestling	0	0	2	2
Total	0	3	5	8

== Weightlifting ==
Results

Athlete	Event	Snatch		Clean & Jerk		Total	Result
Athlete	Event	Result	Rank	Result	Rank	Total	Result
Ilkhomjon Shukurov	Men's -73kg	100	6	130	6	230	6
