= Tunisia at the 2021 Islamic Solidarity Games =

- IOC code: TUN
- NOC: Tunisian Olympic Committee

in Konya, Turkey
- Competitors: 20
- Medals: Gold 0 Silver 1 Bronze 6 Total 7

Islamic Solidarity Games appearances (overview)
- 2005; 2013; 2017; 2021; 2025

Tunisia participated in the 2021 Islamic Solidarity Games held in Konya, Turkey from 9 to 18 August 2022.

The games had been rescheduled several times. In May 2021, the ISSF postponed the event to August 2022 citing the COVID-19 pandemic situation in the participating countries.

== Medalists ==
Medal	Name	Sport	Event	Date

Medals by sport
Sport	1st place, gold medalist(s)	2nd place, silver medalist(s)	3rd place, bronze medalist(s)	Total
Judo	0	1	2	3
Karate	0	0	2	2
Wrestling	0	0	0	0
Total	0	1	6	7

== Weightlifting ==
Results

Athlete	Event	Snatch		Clean & Jerk		Total	Result
Athlete	Event	Result	Rank	Result	Rank	Total	Result
Ayoub Salem	Men's -73kg	119	5	135	5	254	5
Hamza Ben Amor	Men's -81kg	132	13	155	14	287	14
Nawres Hamraoui							
Zahra Trab							
