= Uganda at the 2021 Islamic Solidarity Games =

- IOC code: UGA
- NOC: Uganda Olympic Committee

in Konya, Turkey
- Competitors: 42
- Medals: Gold 2 Silver 5 Bronze 3 Total 10

Islamic Solidarity Games appearances
- 2005; 2013; 2017; 2021; 2025

Uganda participated in the 2021 Islamic Solidarity Games held in Konya, Turkey from 9 to 18 August 2022.

The games had been rescheduled several times. In May 2021, the ISSF postponed the event to August 2022 citing the COVID-19 pandemic situation in the participating countries.

== Medalists ==
Medal	Name	Sport	Event	Date
Silver	Husnah Kukundakwe	Swimming	Women's 400 m freestyle (S6-S10)	7 August

Medals by sport
Sport	1st place, gold medalist(s)	2nd place, silver medalist(s)	3rd place, bronze medalist(s)	Total
Athletics	0	1	1	2
Swimming	0	1	0	1
Para swimming	2	3	1	6
Total	2	5	3	10

== Basketball ==
=== Men's 3x3 tournament ===
Group B

Pos	Team	Pld	W	L	PF	PA	PD	Qualification
1	Iran	4	4	0	84	41	+43	Quarterfinals
2	Uganda	4	3	1	67	56	+11	Quarterfinals
3	Guyana	4	2	2	67	68	−1	
4	Mauritania	4	1	3	64	65	−1	
5	Maldives	4	0	4	32	84	−52	

Source: Konya 2021
Rules for classification: 1) Wins; 2) Head-to-head record; 3) Points scored.

14 August
16:00

Report

Maldives	7–20	Uganda

Karatay Congress and Sport Center Konya

14 August
16:00

Report

Uganda	18–15	Guyana

Karatay Congress and Sport Center Konya

16 August
15:30

Report

Iran	21–12	Uganda

Karatay Congress and Sport Center Konya

16 August
18:10

Report

Uganda	17–13	Mauritania

Karatay Congress and Sport Center Konya

Quarterfinal

17 August
15:55

Report

Suriname	16–13	Uganda

Karatay Congress and Sport Center, Konya

=== Women's 3x3 tournament ===
Group B

Pos	Team	Pld	W	L	PF	PA	PD	Qualification
1	Mali	2	2	0	42	20	+22	Quarterfinals
2	Uzbekistan	2	1	1	25	30	−5	Quarterfinals
3	Uganda	2	0	2	17	34	−17	

Source: Konya 2021
Rules for classification: 1) Wins; 2) Head-to-head record; 3) Points scored.

15 August

Report

Uganda	7–22	Mali

Karatay Congress and Sport Center Konya

15 August

Report

Uzbekistan	12–10	Uganda

Karatay Congress and Sport Center Konya

== Weightlifting ==
Results

Athlete	Event	Snatch		Clean & Jerk		Total	Result
Athlete	Event	Result	Rank	Result	Rank	Total	Result
Davis Niyoyita	Men's -55kg	90	5	120	5	210	5
Muzamiru Bukenya	Mens 67 kg	90	13	111	13	201	13
Shabra Mutesi	Women's -59kg	55	7	66	6	121	6
