= Turkmenistan at the 2021 Islamic Solidarity Games =

- IOC code: TKM
- NOC: National Olympic Committee of Turkmenistan

in Konya, Turkey
- Competitors: 103
- Medals: Gold 4 Silver 6 Bronze 13 Total 23

Islamic Solidarity Games appearances (overview)
- 2005; 2013; 2017; 2021; 2025

Turkmenistan participated in the 2021 Islamic Solidarity Games held in Konya, Turkey from 9 to 18 August 2022.

The games had been rescheduled several times. In May 2021, the ISSF postponed the event to August 2022 citing the COVID-19 pandemic situation in the participating countries.

== Medalists ==
Medal	Name	Sport	Event	Date
Gold	Kristina Şermetowa	Weightlifting	Women's 55 kg snatch	11 August
Silver	Kristina Şermetowa	Weightlifting	Women's 55 kg Clean & Jerk	11 August
Silver	Kristina Şermetowa	Weightlifting	Women's 55 kg Total	11 August
Bronze	Ýulduz Jumabaýewa	Weightlifting	Women's 49 kg snatch	11 August
Bronze	Ýulduz Jumabaýewa	Weightlifting	Women's 49 kg Clean & Jerk	11 August
Bronze	Ýulduz Jumabaýewa	Weightlifting	Women's 49 kg Total	11 August
Bronze	Azatjan Açilow	Wrestling	Men's Greco-Roman 63 kg	12 August

Medals by sport
Sport	1st place, gold medalist(s)	2nd place, silver medalist(s)	3rd place, bronze medalist(s)	Total
Judo	0	0	3	3
Kickboxing	1	2	3	6
Weightlifting	3	4	6	13
Wrestling	0	0	1	1
Total	4	6	13	23

== Basketball ==
=== Men's 3x3 tournament ===
Group D

Pos	Team	Pld	W	L	PF	PA	PD	Qualification
1	Suriname	2	2	0	38	27	+11	Quarterfinals
2	Turkmenistan	2	1	1	29	30	−1	Quarterfinals
3	Kyrgyzstan	2	0	2	31	41	−10	

Source: Konya 2021
Rules for classification: 1) Wins; 2) Head-to-head record; 3) Points scored.

16 August
16:45

Report

Turkmenistan	8–18	Suriname

Karatay Congress and Sport Center Konya

16 August
19:10

Report

Turkmenistan	21–12	Kyrgyzstan

Karatay Congress and Sport Center Konya

Quarterfinal

17 August
16:20

Report

Iran	21–11	Turkmenistan

Karatay Congress and Sport Center, Konya

=== Women's 3x3 tournament ===
Group D

Pos	Team	Pld	W	L	PF	PA	PD	Qualification
1	Senegal	3	3	0	56	29	+27	Quarterfinals
2	Iran	3	1	2	54	42	+12	Quarterfinals
3	Turkmenistan	3	1	2	42	53	−11	
4	Gambia	3	1	2	25	53	−28	

Source: Konya 2021
Rules for classification: 1) Wins; 2) Head-to-head record; 3) Points scored.

13 August
13:00

Report

Turkmenistan	21–20	Iran

Karatay Congress and Sport Center, Konya

13 August
13:00

Report

Turkmenistan	11–13	Gambia

Karatay Congress and Sport Center, Konya

15 August

Report

Senegal	20–10	Turkmenistan

Karatay Congress and Sport Center, Konya

== Weightlifting ==
Main Article: Weightlifting at the 2021 Islamic Solidarity Games

Men

Athlete	Event	Snatch		Clean & Jerk		Total	Result
Athlete	Event	Result	Rank	Result	Rank	Total	Result
Ihtiyor Matkerimov	-61 kg	117	5	143	6	260	5
Muhammet Dovranov	-81 kg	147	8	183	7	330	7
Shatlyk Shohradov	-89 kg	157	4	x	-	x	-
Davranbek Hasanbayev	-96 kg	165	2nd place, silver medalist(s)	183	5	348	4
Hojamuhammet Toychyyev	+109 kg	184	2nd place, silver medalist(s)	225	3rd place, bronze medalist(s)	409	3rd place, bronze medalist(s)

Women

Athlete	Event	Snatch		Clean & Jerk		Total	Result
Athlete	Event	Result	Rank	Result	Rank	Total	Result
Yulduz Jumabayeva	-49 kg	74	3rd place, bronze medalist(s)	93	3rd place, bronze medalist(s)	167	3rd place, bronze medalist(s)
Bagul Berdyyeva	-49 kg	68	4	x	-	x	-
Kristina Shermetova	-55 kg	89	1st place, gold medalist(s)	105	2nd place, silver medalist(s)	194	2nd place, silver medalist(s)
Gulnabat Kadyrova	-71 kg	107	1st place, gold medalist(s)	118	3rd place, bronze medalist(s)	225	1st place, gold medalist(s)
Sangiza Bahtyyarova	+87 kg	85	6	110	6	195	6
