= Ivory Coast at the 2021 Islamic Solidarity Games =

- IOC code: CIV
- NOC: National Olympic Committee of Ivory Coast

in Konya, Turkey
- Competitors: 10
- Medals: Gold 1 Silver 1 Bronze 2 Total 4

Islamic Solidarity Games appearances
- 2005; 2013; 2017; 2021; 2025

Ivory Coast participated in the 2021 Islamic Solidarity Games held in Konya, Turkey from 9 to 18 August 2022.

The games had been rescheduled several times. In May 2021, the ISSF postponed the event to August 2022 citing the COVID-19 pandemic situation in the participating countries.

== Medalists ==
Medal	Name	Sport	Event	Date
Gold	Arthur Cissé	Athletics	Men's 100 metres	9 August
Bronze	Maboundou Koné	Athletics	Women's 100 metres	9 August

Medals by sport
Sport	1st place, gold medalist(s)	2nd place, silver medalist(s)	3rd place, bronze medalist(s)	Total
Archery	0	0	0	0
Athletics	1	0	2	3
Karate	0	0	0	0
Taekwondo	0	0	0	0
Weightlifting	0	0	0	0
Wrestling	0	1	0	1
Total	1	1	2	2

== Athletics ==
Track & road events

Athlete	Event	Semifinal		Final	
Athlete	Event	Result	Rank	Result	Rank
Arthur Cissé	100 m	9.91	1	9.89 GR	1st place, gold medalist(s)
Donatien Cyriaque Djero	100 m	10.36	13	Did not advance	
Maboundou Koné	100 m	11.36	4	11.13	3rd place, bronze medalist(s)
