= Weightlifting at the Islamic Solidarity Games =

Weightlifting has been an event at the Islamic Solidarity Games since 2005 in Mecca.

== Editions ==
Games	Year	Host city	Best nation
I	2005	Mecca, Saudi Arabia	Iraq
II	2010	Teheran, Iran	Games was canceled
III	2013	Palembang, Indonesia	Indonesia
IV	2017	Baku, Azerbaijan	Egypt
V	2022	Konya, Turkey	Uzbekistan
VI	2025	Riyadh, Saudi Arabia	Turkey

== Events ==
=== Men's events ===
2005–2017 *

- Bantamweight -56 kg
- Featherweight 56–62 kg
- Lightweight 62–69 kg
- Middleweight 69–77 kg
- Light-heavyweight 77–85 kg
- Middle-heavyweight 85–94 kg
- Heavyweight 94–105 kg
- Super heavyweight +105 kg

2021–present

- 55 kg
- 61 kg
- 67 kg
- 73 kg
- 81 kg
- 89 kg
- 96 kg
- 102 kg
- 109 kg
- +109 kg

=== Women's events ===
2013 *

- 48 kg
- 53 kg
- 58 kg
- 63 kg
- 69 kg
- 75 kg
- +75 kg

2017 *

- 48 kg
- 53 kg
- 58 kg
- 63 kg
- 69 kg
- 75 kg
- 90 kg
- +90 kg

2021–present

- 45 kg
- 49 kg
- 55 kg
- 59 kg
- 64 kg
- 71 kg
- 76 kg
- 81 kg
- 87 kg
- +87 kg

- In 2013 and 2017 only total event awarded medals

== Medal table ==
Rank	Nation	Gold	Silver	Bronze	Total
1	Indonesia (INA)	21	13	12	46
2	Uzbekistan (UZB)	16	6	11	33
3	Turkey (TUR)	14	14	8	36
4	Iraq (IRQ)	11	12	4	27
5	Iran (IRI)	11	8	13	32
6	Saudi Arabia (KSA)	9	14	8	31
7	Egypt (EGY)	9	7	2	18
8	Kazakhstan (KAZ)	8	15	3	26
9	Turkmenistan (TKM)	5	6	12	23
10	Syria (SYR)	4	0	5	9
11	Azerbaijan (AZE)	3	6	12	21
12	Kyrgyzstan (KGZ)	2	3	9	14
13	Cameroon (CMR)	1	4	2	7
14	Tunisia (TUN)	1	0	2	3
15	Malaysia (MAS)	0	4	6	10
16	Nigeria (NGR)	0	2	1	3
17	Oman (OMA)	0	1	0	1
18	Jordan (JOR)	0	0	2	2
18	Libya (LBA)	0	0	2	2
20	Lebanon (LBN)	0	0	1	1
Totals (20 entries)		115	115	115	345
