= Algeria at the Islamic Solidarity Games =

- IOC code: ALG
- NOC: Algerian Olympic Committee
- Medals Ranked 12th: Gold 27 Silver 48 Bronze 86 Total 161

Islamic Solidarity Games appearances (overview)
- 2005; 2013; 2017; 2021; 2025

Algeria has competed at every celebration of the Islamic Solidarity Games. Its athletes have won a total of 161 medals.

== Medal tables ==
=== Medals by Islamic Solidarity Games ===
Host nation

Below the table representing all Algerian medals around the games. Till now, Algeria win 161 medals and 27 gold medals.

Games	Athletes	Gold	Silver	Bronze	Total	Rank	Notes
(Saudi Arabia) 2005 Mecca	?	3	10	13	26	9	details
(Iran) 2010 Tehran	Canceled						
(Indonesia) 2013 Palembang	78	5	6	8	19	9	details
(Azerbaijan) 2017 Baku	118	7	12	21	40	6	details
(Turkey) 2021 Konya	147	7	12	23	42	10	details
(Saudi Arabia) 2025 Riyadh	117	5	8	21	34	12	details
(Malaysia) 2029 Selangor	Future event						
Total		27	48	86	161	12	–

== Medals by sport ==
Update to 2025 Islamic Solidarity Games

Sport	Gold	Silver	Bronze	Total
Swimming	10	10	10	30
Athletics	8	9	17	34
Bocce	3	4	3	10
Judo	2	6	10	18
Karate	1	6	16	23
Boxing	1	2	3	6
Para-athletics	1	1	0	2
Handball	1	0	0	1
Gymnastics	0	3	0	3
Tennis	0	2	2	4
Kickboxing	0	1	9	10
Table tennis	0	1	3	4
Wushu	0	1	2	3
Basketball	0	1	0	1
Cycling	0	1	0	1
Wrestling	0	0	6	6
Volleyball	0	0	2	2
Football	0	0	1	1
Ju-jitsu	0	0	1	1
Muaythai	0	0	1	1
Totals (20 entries)	27	48	86	161

== Athletes with most medals ==
The Algerian athlete who won the most medals in the history of the Islamic Solidarity Games, by swimmer Jaouad Syoud.

Athlete	Sport	Games	Gold medal	Silver medal	Bronze medal	Total
Jaouad Syoud	Swimming	2021–2025	3	3	0	6
Oussama Sahnoune	Swimming	2013–2017	4	1	0	5
Souad Cherouati	Swimming	2013–2017	3	0	1	4
Abdelmalik Lahoulou	Athletics	2013–2021	1	1	2	4
Nesrine Medjahed	Swimming	2025	0	2	2	4
Ryma Benmansour	Swimming	2025	0	2	1	3
Lilia Sihem Midouni	Swimming	2025	0	2	1	3
Slimane Saoudi	Tennis	2005	0	1	2	3
Amel Melih	Swimming	2017	0	1	2	3
Mehdi Hamama	Swimming	2005	0	2	0	2
Nadjib Temmar	Judo	2017	0	2	0	2
Abdellaoui Samara	Swimming	2025	0	2	0	2
Abdelhak Hameurlaine	Tennis	2005	0	1	1	2
Bella Maheidine	Table tennis	2025	0	1	1	2
Jellouli Milhane Amine	Table tennis	2025	0	1	1	2
Mehdi Bouloussa	Table tennis	2025	0	0	2	2
Ayoub Anis Helassa	Karate	2021–2025	0	0	2	2
Bachir Sid Azara	Wrestling	2017–2025	0	0	2	2

Notes: in Khaki the athletes still in activity.

== See also ==
- Algeria at the Olympics
- Algeria at the African Games
- Algeria at the Arab Games
- Algeria at the Mediterranean Games
- Algeria at the Paralympics
- Sports in Algeria
