= Turkey at the Islamic Solidarity Games =

- IOC code: TUR
- NOC: Turkish National Olympic Committee
- Website: www.olimpiyatkomitesi.org.tr
- Medals Ranked 1st: Gold 312 Silver 251 Bronze 238 Total 801

Islamic Solidarity Games appearances (overview)
- 2005; 2013; 2017; 2021; 2025

Turkey has participated in every edition of the Islamic Solidarity Games since the inaugural event in Mecca, 2005. As of 2025, according to the Islamic Solidarity Sports Federation, Turkish athletes have won a total of 801 medals — 312 gold, 251 silver and 238 bronze. Turkey is ranked as the most successful nation in the overall history of the Islamic Solidarity Games.

== Medal tables ==
=== Medals by Islamic Solidarity Games ===
Host nation

Below is the table representing all Turkish medals in the games. Until now, Turkey has won 801 medals (312 gold, 251 silver, and 238 bronze).

| Games | Athletes | Gold | Silver | Bronze | Total | Rank | Notes |
| (Saudi Arabia) 2005 Mecca | | 1 | 3 | 3 | 7 | 15 | details |
| (Iran) 2010 Tehran | Canceled | | | | | | |
| (Indonesia) 2013 Palembang | | 23 | 30 | 50 | 103 | 5 | details |
| (Azerbaijan) 2017 Baku | 336 | 71 | 67 | 57 | 195 | 2 | details |
| (Turkey) 2021 Konya | 341 | 145 | 107 | 89 | 341 | 1 | details |
| (Saudi Arabia) 2025 Riyadh | 212 | 72 | 44 | 39 | 155 | 1 | details |
| Total | | 311 | 252 | 238 | 801 | 1st | |

=== Medals by Summer Sport ===
Leading in that sport

| Sport | Gold | Silver | Bronze | Total |
|---|---|---|---|---|
| Swimming | 93 | 70 | 42 | 205 |
| Athletics | 36 | 33 | 25 | 94 |
| Weightlifting | 27 | 19 | 11 | 57 |
| Gymnastics | 18 | 9 | 15 | 42 |
| Kickboxing | 18 | 5 | 4 | 27 |
| Judo | 16 | 6 | 13 | 35 |
| Para swimming | 12 | 9 | 8 | 29 |
| Fencing | 11 | 6 | 4 | 21 |
| Karate | 10 | 13 | 18 | 41 |
| Taekwondo | 9 | 18 | 19 | 46 |
| Para table tennis | 7 | 2 | 1 | 10 |
| Shooting | 6 | 7 | 6 | 19 |
| Para archery | 6 | 6 | 2 | 14 |
| Archery | 6 | 3 | 3 | 12 |
| Tennis | 6 | 2 | 10 | 18 |
| Wrestling | 4 | 15 | 26 | 45 |
| Bocce | 4 | 5 | 1 | 10 |
| Table tennis | 4 | 4 | 5 | 13 |
| Boxing | 3 | 3 | 2 | 8 |
| Muaythai | 3 | 1 | 1 | 5 |
| Wushu | 2 | 3 | 5 | 10 |
| Handball | 2 | 3 | 0 | 5 |
| Volleyball | 2 | 2 | 2 | 6 |
| Para athletics | 1 | 3 | 2 | 6 |
| Badminton | 1 | 1 | 5 | 7 |
| Diving | 1 | 1 | 1 | 3 |
| Duathlon | 1 | 1 | 1 | 3 |
| Basketball | 1 | 0 | 1 | 2 |
| Football | 1 | 0 | 1 | 2 |
| Water polo | 1 | 0 | 0 | 1 |
| 3x3 basketball | 0 | 1 | 2 | 3 |
| Para powerlifting | 0 | 0 | 2 | 2 |
| Totals (32 entries) | 312 | 251 | 238 | 801 |

== See also ==
- Turkey at the Olympics
- Turkey at the Paralympics
- Turkey at the European Games
- Turkey at the Mediterranean Games
- Sports in Turkey
