= United Arab Emirates at the Islamic Solidarity Games =

- IOC code: UAE
- NOC: UAENOC
- Medals Ranked 19th: Gold 9 Silver 13 Bronze 28 Total 50

Islamic Solidarity Games appearances (overview)
- 2005; 2013; 2017; 2021; 2025

the United Arab Emirates has competed in all editions of the Islamic Solidarity Games since its debut appearance at the inaugural event in Mecca in 2005. As of 2025, figures reported by the Islamic Solidarity Sports Federation indicate that athletes from the United Arab Emirates have earned a total of 50 medals, comprising 9 gold, 13 silver, and 28 bronze. In the overall standings, Emirati ranks 19th in the medal table following the most recent Islamic Solidarity Games, which were hosted in Riyadh, Saudi Arabia.

== Medal tables ==
=== Medals by Islamic Solidarity Games ===
Host nation

Below is the table representing all Emirati medals in the games. Until now, the United Arab Emirates has won 50 medals (9 gold, 13 silver, and 28 bronze).

Games	Athletes	Gold	Silver	Bronze	Total	Rank	Notes
(Saudi Arabia) 2005 Mecca		0	2	3	5	23rd	details
(Iran) 2010 Tehran	Canceled						
(Indonesia) 2013 Palembang		0	1	3	4	19th	details
(Azerbaijan) 2017 Baku		0	1	3	4	29th	details
(Turkey) 2021 Konya		3	2	5	10	14th	details
(Saudi Arabia) 2025 Riyadh		6	7	14	27	11th	details
(Malaysia) 2029 Selangor	Future event						
Total		9	13	28	50	19th	-

== See also ==
- United Arab Emirates at the Olympics
- United Arab Emirates at the Paralympics
- United Arab Emirates at the Asian Games
- United Arab Emirates at the Arab Games
- Sports in the United Arab Emirates
