= Egypt at the Islamic Solidarity Games =

- IOC code: EGY
- NOC: Egyptian Olympic Committee
- Medals Ranked 6th: Gold 46 Silver 51 Bronze 49 Total 146

Islamic Solidarity Games appearances (overview)
- 2005; 2013; 2017; 2021; 2025

Egypt has competed at every celebration of the Islamic Solidarity Games Except the 2021 Edition in Konya, Turkey. Its athletes have won a total of 146 medals of whoom 46 gold, 51 silver, and 49 bronze. Most medals won in a tournament was 86 medals in 2013 Islamic Solidarity Games, and most gold medal earned in an Edition was 26 gold as well in the 2013 Islamic Solidarity Games.

== Medal tables ==
=== Medals by Islamic Solidarity Games ===
Host nation

Below the table representing all Egyptian medals around the games. Till now, Egypt win 146 medals of whoom 46 gold, 51 silver, and 49 bronze.

Games	Athletes	Gold	Silver	Bronze	Total	Rank	Notes	RF
(Saudi Arabia) 2005 Mecca		14	15	13	42	2	details	
(Iran) 2010 Tehran	Canceled							
(Indonesia) 2013 Palembang		26	31	29	86	3	details	
(Azerbaijan) 2017 Baku		6	5	7	18	9	details	
(Turkey) 2021 Konya	Did not compete							
(Saudi Arabia) 2025 Riyadh								
Total		46	51	49	146	6	-	-

== See also ==
- Egypt at the Olympics
- Egypt at the African Games
- Egypt at the Arab Games
- Egypt at the Mediterranean Games
- Egypt at the Paralympics
- Sports in Egypt
