= Bocce at the 2021 Islamic Solidarity Games – Results =

These are the results of the Bocce at the 2021 Islamic Solidarity Games which took place between 9 and 12 August 2022 in Konya, Turkey.

== Lyonnaise ==
=== Men's precision shooting ===
9 August

Rank	Athlete	Score
1	Mohamed Bachir Mokhtari (ALG)	26
2	Faik Dursun Öztürk (TUR)	24
3	Yassine Ouinaksi (MAR)	23
4	Ali El-Segher (LBA)	18
5	Babacar Samoura (SEN)	13
6	Boubacar Yaye Djibo (NIG)	0

Semifinals; 10 August		Final; 12 August
Mohamed Bachir Mokhtari (ALG)	12
Ali El-Segher (LBA)	7	Mohamed Bachir Mokhtari (ALG)	14
Faik Dursun Öztürk (TUR)	17	Faik Dursun Öztürk (TUR)	8
Yassine Ouinaksi (MAR)	12

=== Men's progressive shooting ===
9 August

Rank	Athlete	Score
1	Mehmet Can Yakın (TUR)	74
2	Ali El-Segher (LBA)	60
3	Mohamed Benslim (ALG)	59
4	Saad Arguiel (MAR)	58

Semifinals; 10 August		Final; 12 August
Mehmet Can Yakın (TUR)	48
Saad Arguiel (MAR)	28	Mehmet Can Yakın (TUR)	41
Ali El-Segher (LBA)	29	Mohamed Benslim (ALG)	31
Mohamed Benslim (ALG)	33

=== Women's precision shooting ===
9 August

Rank	Athlete	Score
1	Fatiha Targhaoui (MAR)	30
2	Kamilia Kadour (ALG)	12
3	Neşe Şahin (TUR)	11

Final; 12 August
Fatiha Targhaoui (MAR)	16
Kamilia Kadour (ALG)	4

=== Women's progressive shooting ===
10 August

Rank	Athlete	Score
1	İnci Ece Öztürk (TUR)	68
2	Celia Afenaï (ALG)	33
3	Bouchra Lefhal El-Alaoui (MAR)	31

Final; 12 August
İnci Ece Öztürk (TUR)	46
Celia Afenaï (ALG)	44

=== Mixed relay ===
9 August

Rank	Team	Score
1	Burak Altay (TUR); Necla Şahin (TUR)	88
2	Mohamed Lamine Chachoua (ALG); Celia Afenaï (ALG)	58
3	Saad Arguiel (MAR); Bouchra Lefhal El-Alaoui (MAR)	44

Final; 12 August
Burak Altay (TUR); Necla Şahin (TUR)	43
Mohamed Lamine Chachoua (ALG); Celia Afenaï (ALG)	35

== Raffa ==
=== Men's singles ===
10–11 August

Pos	Athlete	Pld	W	L	PF	PA	TUR	ALG	LBA	MAR	SEN	NIG
1	Oğuzhan Turhan (TUR)	5	5	0	60	14	—	12–2	12–8	12–3	12–1	12–0
2	Ali Hakim (ALG)	5	4	1	47	27	2–12	—	9–8	12–4	12–3	12–0
3	Rashed Al-Swesi (LBA)	5	3	2	49	35	8–12	8–9	—	11–7	10–7	12–0
4	Abdeljalil El-Moustafid (MAR)	5	2	3	36	46	3–12	4–12	7–11	—	12–4	10–7
5	Babacar Samoura (SEN)	5	1	4	27	48	1–12	3–12	7–10	4–12	—	12–2
6	Salifou Sabith Assoumane (NIG)	5	0	5	9	58	0–12	0–12	0–12	7–10	2–12	—

Source: CBI

Semifinals; 11 August		Final; 12 August
Oğuzhan Turhan (TUR)	11
Abdeljalil El-Moustafid (MAR)	6	Oğuzhan Turhan (TUR)	7
Ali Hakim (ALG)	9	Rashed Al-Swesi (LBA)	12
Rashed Al-Swesi (LBA)	10

=== Men's doubles ===
10–11 August

Pos	Team	Pld	W	L	PF	PA	ALG	LBA	TUR	MAR	SEN	NIG
1	Ali Hakim (ALG) Ahmed Triaki (ALG)	5	4	1	51	20	—	5–10	10–4	12–4	12–1	12–1
2	Rashed Al-Swesi (LBA) Abdulmohaimen Zantoute (LBA)	5	4	1	51	21	10–5	—	5–12	12–4	12–0	12–0
3	Cem Şimşek (TUR) Erdal Kantemir (TUR)	5	4	1	51	27	4–10	12–5	—	11–8	12–1	12–3
4	Abdeljalil El-Moustafid (MAR) Yassine Ouinaksi (MAR)	5	2	3	40	38	4–12	4–12	8–11	—	12–2	12–1
5	François Ndiaye (SEN) Babacar Samoura (SEN)	5	1	4	16	54	1–12	0–12	1–12	2–12	—	12–6
6	Salifou Sabith Assoumane (NIG) Abdoulkarim Manzo Diallo (NIG)	5	0	5	11	60	1–12	0–12	3–12	1–12	6–12	—

Source: CBI

Semifinals; 11 August		Final; 12 August
Ali Hakim (ALG); Ahmed Triaki (ALG)	8
Abdeljalil El-Moustafid (MAR); Yassine Ouinaksi (MAR)	9	Abdeljalil El-Moustafid (MAR); Yassine Ouinaksi (MAR)	11
Cem Şimşek (TUR); Erdal Kantemir (TUR)	11	Cem Şimşek (TUR); Erdal Kantemir (TUR)	8
Rashed Al-Swesi (LBA); Abdulmohaimen Zantoute (LBA)	8

=== Women's singles ===
10–11 August

Pos	Athlete	Pld	W	L	PF	PA	TUR	MAR	ALG
1	Rukiye Varol (TUR)	2	1	1	19	10	—	7–9	12–1
2	Sara El-Mzamzi El-Idrissi (MAR)	2	1	1	13	17	9–7	—	4–10
3	Lamia Aissioui (ALG)	2	1	1	11	16	1–12	10–4	—

Source: CBI

Final; 12 August
Rukiye Varol (TUR)	12
Sara El-Mzamzi El-Idrissi (MAR)	2

=== Women's doubles ===
10–11 August

Pos	Team	Pld	W	L	PF	PA	TUR	ALG	MAR
1	Bahar Çil (TUR) Esile Emen (TUR)	2	2	0	20	13	—	10–6	10–7
2	Lamia Aissioui (ALG) Chahrazad Chiban (ALG)	2	1	1	18	11	6–10	—	12–1
3	Sara El-Mzamzi El-Idrissi (MAR) Dounia Aitoutouhen (MAR)	2	0	2	8	22	7–10	1–12	—

Source: CBI

Final; 12 August
Bahar Çil (TUR); Esile Emen (TUR)	8
Lamia Aissioui (ALG); Chahrazad Chiban (ALG)	12

=== Mixed doubles ===
10–11 August

Pos	Team	Pld	W	L	PF	PA	ALG	TUR	MAR
1	Tarek Zekiri (ALG) Besma Boukarnafa (ALG)	2	2	0	20	13	—	11–10	12–8
2	Cem Şimşek (TUR) Esile Emen (TUR)	2	1	1	18	11	10–11	—	12–3
3	Mohamed Reda Saoud (MAR) Dounia Aitoutouhen (MAR)	2	0	2	8	22	8–12	3–12	—

Source: CBI

Final; 12 August
Tarek Zekiri (ALG); Besma Boukarnafa (ALG)	12
Cem Şimşek (TUR); Esile Emen (TUR)	9
