= Kyrgyzstan at the Islamic Solidarity Games =

- IOC code: KGZ
- NOC: NOCKR
- Medals Ranked 13th: Gold 14 Silver 15 Bronze 27 Total 56

Islamic Solidarity Games appearances (overview)
- 2005; 2013; 2017; 2021; 2025

Kyrgyzstan has competed at every celebration of the Islamic Solidarity Games since the first edition in Mecca. As of the last tournament held in 2021 in Konya, Turkey, the Kyrgyz athletes have won a total of 56 medals (14 gold, 15 silver, and 27 bronze), placing them in 13th place in the all-time medal table. Most medals won in a tournament was 31 medals in 2021 Islamic Solidarity Games, and most gold medals earned in an Edition was 8 gold as well in 2021 Islamic Solidarity Games.

== Medal tables ==
=== Medals by Islamic Solidarity Games ===
Host nation

Below the table representing all Kyrgyz medals in the games. Till now, Kyrgyzstan has won 56 medals of which 14 gold, 15 silver, and 27 bronze.

Games	Athletes	Gold	Silver	Bronze	Total	Rank	Notes	RF
(Saudi Arabia) 2005 Mecca		2	2	4	8	12	details	
(Iran) 2010 Tehran	Canceled							
(Indonesia) 2013 Palembang		0	0	0	0	—	details	
(Azerbaijan) 2017 Baku		4	5	8	17	10	details	
(Turkey) 2021 Konya		8	8	15	31	9	details	
(Saudi Arabia) 2025 Riyadh							details	
Total		14	15	27	56	13th	-	-

== See also ==
- Kyrgyzstan at the Olympics
- Kyrgyzstan at the Paralympics
- Kyrgyzstan at the Asian Games
- Sports in Kyrgyzstan
