= Algeria at the 2005 Islamic Solidarity Games =

- IOC code: ALG
- NOC: Algerian Olympic Committee

in Mecca, Saudi Arabia
- Medals Ranked 9th: Gold 3 Silver 10 Bronze 13 Total 26

Islamic Solidarity Games appearances (overview)
- 2005; 2013; 2017; 2021; 2025

Algeria participated in the 2005 Islamic Solidarity Games held in Mecca, Saudi Arabia, from 8 to 20 April 2005. The Algerian delegation won 26 medals and finished 9th in the overall medal table.

== Medal summary ==
=== Medal table ===
Medal	Name	Sport	Event	Date
Gold	Tarek Boukensa	Athletics	Men's 1500 m	April
Gold	Merzak Ould Bouchiba	Athletics	Men's 3000 m steeplechase	April
Gold	Men's handball team	Handball	Men's tournament	April
Silver	Khoudir Aggoune	Athletics	Men's 5000 m	April
Silver	Saïd Belhout	Athletics	Men's Marathon	April
Silver	Moussa Aouanouk	Athletics	Men's 20 km walk	April
Silver	Issam Nima	Athletics	Men's Long jump	April
Silver	Mourad Souissi	Athletics	Men's Decathlon	April
Silver	Men's basketball team	Basketball	Men's tournament	April
Silver	Adnan Tariq	Karate	Men's Kumite −80 kg	April
Silver	Mehdi Hamama	Swimming	Men's 200 m individual medley	April
Silver	Mehdi Hamama	Swimming	Men's 4 × 100 m freestyle relay 400 m individual medley	April
Silver	Abdelhak Hameurlaine; Slimane Saoudi	Tennis	Men's Team	April
Bronze	Antar Zerguelaïne	Athletics	Men's 1500 m	April
Bronze	Samir Moussaoui	Athletics	Men's 5000 m	April
Bronze	Abderrahmane Hammadi	Athletics	Men's 400 m hurdles	April
Bronze	Hamza Ménina	Athletics	Men's Triple jump	April
Bronze	Rédouane Youcef	Athletics	Men's Decathlon	April
Bronze	Algeria team	Karate	Men's Kata Team	April
Bronze	Omer Moloud	Karate	Men's Kumite −60 kg	April
Bronze	Algeria team	Karate	Men's Kumite Team	April
Bronze	Algeria team	Swimming	Men's 4 × 100 m freestyle relay	April
Bronze	Talahy Bilal; Mohamaed Boudjadja; Abdel Hakim Djaziri; Taher Khallaf; Fateh Ourahmoune	Table tennis	Men's Team	April
Bronze	Slimane Saoudi	Tennis	Men's Singles	April
Bronze	Abdelhak Hameurlaine; Slimane Saoudi	Tennis	Men's Doubles	April
Bronze	Men's volleyball team	Volleyball	Men's tournament	April

Medals by sport
Sport	1st place, gold medalist(s)	2nd place, silver medalist(s)	3rd place, bronze medalist(s)	Total
Athletics	2	5	5	12
Basketball	0	1	0	1
Handball	1	0	0	1
Karate	0	1	3	4
Swimming	0	2	1	3
Table tennis	0	0	1	1
Tennis	0	1	2	3
Volleyball	0	0	1	1
Total	3	10	13	26

=== Athletes with most medals ===
Athlete	Sport	Gold medal	Silver medal	Bronze medal	Total
Slimane Saoudi	Tennis	0	1	2	3
Mehdi Hamama	Swimming	0	2	0	2
Abdelhak Hameurlaine	Tennis	0	1	1	2

== Paralympic sports ==
=== Medal table ===
Medal	Name	Sport	Event	Date
Silver	Men's goalball team	Goalball	Men's tournament	April
Bronze	Algeria team	Intellectually Disabled Futsal	Men's tournament	April
