= Tunisia at the Islamic Solidarity Games =

- IOC code: TUN
- NOC: Tunisian Olympic Committee
- Medals Ranked 20th: Gold 8 Silver 8 Bronze 39 Total 55

Islamic Solidarity Games appearances (overview)
- 2005; 2013; 2017; 2021; 2025

Tunisia has competed at every celebration of the Islamic Solidarity Games since its inception back in 2005 in Mecca. As off the last Islamic Solidarity Games Edition in Konya 2021 the Tunisian athletes manage to won a total of 37 medals of whoom 4 gold, 4 silver, and 29 bronze, make them ranked 21st in all-time medal table. Most medals won in a single tournament was 12 medals in 2017 Islamic Solidarity Games, and most gold medal secured in an Edition was 2 gold in 2013 Islamic Solidarity Games.

== Medal tables ==
=== Medals by Islamic Solidarity Games ===
Host nation

Below the table representing all Tunisian medals around the games. Till now, Tunisia win 37 medals of whoom 4 gold, 4 silver, and 29 bronze.

| Games | Athletes | Gold | Silver | Bronze | Total | Rank | Notes | RF |
| (Saudi Arabia) 2005 Mecca | | 1 | 0 | 8 | 9 | 20 | details | |
| (Iran) 2010 Tehran | Canceled | | | | | | | |
| (Indonesia) 2013 Palembang | | 2 | 0 | 7 | 9 | 14 | details | |
| (Azerbaijan) 2017 Baku | | 1 | 3 | 8 | 12 | 19 | details | |
| (Turkey) 2021 Konya | | 0 | 1 | 6 | 7 | 31 | details | |
| (Saudi Arabia) 2025 Riyadh | | 4 | 4 | 10 | 18 | 15 | details | |
| (Malaysia) 2029 Selangor | Future event | | | | | | | |
| Total | | 8 | 8 | 39 | 55 | 20 | - | - |

== See also ==
- Tunisia at the Olympics
- Tunisia at the African Games
- Tunisia at the Arab Games
- Tunisia at the Mediterranean Games
- Tunisia at the Paralympics
- Sports in Tunisia
