= Jordan at the Islamic Solidarity Games =

- IOC code: JOR
- NOC: Jordan Olympic Committee
- Medals Ranked 17th: Gold 11 Silver 9 Bronze 32 Total 52

Islamic Solidarity Games appearances (overview)
- 2005; 2013; 2017; 2021; 2025

Jordan has taken part in every edition of the Islamic Solidarity Games since the first tournament held in Mecca, 2005. By 2025, data from the Islamic Solidarity Sports Federation shows that Jordanian competitors have secured 52 medals in total — including 11 gold, 9 silver, and 32 bronze. Overall, Jordan holds the top 17th position in the medal table as off the last Islamic Solidarity Games held in Riyadh, Saudi Arabia.

== Medal tables ==
=== Medals by Islamic Solidarity Games ===
Host nation

Below is the table representing all Jordanian medals in the games. Until now, Jordan has won 52 medals (11 gold, 9 silver, and 32 bronze).

Games	Athletes	Gold	Silver	Bronze	Total	Rank	Notes	RF
(Saudi Arabia) 2005 Mecca		2	0	3	5	13th	details	
(Iran) 2010 Tehran	Canceled							
(Indonesia) 2013 Palembang		1	1	2	4	17th	details	
(Azerbaijan) 2017 Baku		3	1	12	16	12th	details	
(Turkey) 2021 Konya		2	4	6	12	18th	details	
(Saudi Arabia) 2025 Riyadh		3	3	10	16	17th	details	
(Malaysia) 2029 Selangor	Future event							
Total		11	9	32	52	17th	-	-

== See also ==
- Jordan at the Olympics
- Jordan at the Paralympics
- Jordan at the Asian Games
- Jordan at the Arab Games
- Sports in Jordan
