= Nigeria at the Islamic Solidarity Games =

- IOC code: NGR
- NOC: Nigeria Olympic Committee
- Medals Ranked 24th: Gold 3 Silver 6 Bronze 2 Total 11

Islamic Solidarity Games appearances (overview)
- 2005; 2013; 2017; 2021; 2025

Nigeria has participated at every celebration of the Islamic Solidarity Games since the first edition in 2005 in Mecca. The Nigerian athletes have won a total of 11 medals (3 gold, 6 silver, and 2 bronze), placing them 24th on the all-time medal table.

The most medals won in a single tournament was 6 medals in 2017 Islamic Solidarity Games, and most gold medal earned was 2 gold medals as well in the 2017 Islamic Solidarity Games.

== Medal tables ==
=== Medals by Islamic Solidarity Games ===
Host nation

Below the table representing all Nigerian medals in the games. Till now, Nigeria has won 11 medals (3 gold, 6 silver, and 2 bronze).

Games	Athletes	Gold	Silver	Bronze	Total	Rank	Notes	RF
(Saudi Arabia) 2005 Mecca		0	0	0	—	—	details	
(Iran) 2010 Tehran	Canceled							
(Indonesia) 2013 Palembang		0	0	0	—	—	details	
(Azerbaijan) 2017 Baku		2	3	1	6	17	details	
(Turkey) 2021 Konya		1	3	1	5	21	details	
(Saudi Arabia) 2025 Riyadh							details	
(Malaysia) 2029 Selangor	Future event							
Total		3	6	2	11	24th	-	-

== See also ==
- Nigeria at the Olympics
- Nigeria at the African Games
- Nigeria at the Commonwealth Games
- Nigeria at the Paralympics
- Sports in Nigeria
