= Kazakhstan at the Islamic Solidarity Games =

- IOC code: KAZ
- NOC: ҚРҰОк
- Medals Ranked 7th: Gold 42 Silver 36 Bronze 56 Total 134

Islamic Solidarity Games appearances (overview)
- 2005; 2013; 2017; 2021; 2025

Kazakhstan has competed at every celebration of the Islamic Solidarity Games. Its athletes have won a total of 134 medals (42 gold, 36 silver, and 56 bronze). Most combined medals won in a tournament was in 2021 Islamic Solidarity Games with 89 medals, and most gold medal won in an Edition was 27 gold as well in the 2021 Islamic Solidarity Games.

== Medal tables ==
=== Medals by Islamic Solidarity Games ===
Host nation

Below the table representing all Kazakhstani medals around the games. Till now, Kazakhstan win 134 medals of which 42 gold, 36 silver, and 56 bronze.

Games	Athletes	Gold	Silver	Bronze	Total	Rank	Notes	RF
(Saudi Arabia) 2005 Mecca		13	8	6	27	3	details	
(Iran) 2010 Tehran	Canceled							
(Indonesia) 2013 Palembang		0	0	0	0	—	details	
(Azerbaijan) 2017 Baku		2	5	12	19	14	details	
(Turkey) 2021 Konya		27	23	39	89	5	details	
(Saudi Arabia) 2025 Riyadh								
Total		42	36	56	134	7	―	―

== See also ==
- Kazakhstan at the Olympics
- Kazakhstan at the Paralympics
- Kazakhstan at the Asian Games
- Sports in Kazakhstan
