= Taekwondo at the Islamic Solidarity Games =

Taekwondo is one of the sports at the quadrennial Islamic Solidarity Games competition. Taekwondo competitions was inaugurated since the first edition in 2005.

== Editions ==
Games	Year	Host city	Host country	Events
I	2005	Mecca	Saudi Arabia	8
II	2010	Tehran	Iran	Cancelled
III	2013	Palembang	Indonesia	21
IV	2017	Baku	Azerbaijan	16
V	2022	Konya	Turkey	16
VI	2025	Riyadh	Saudi Arabia	12

== Medal table ==
Updated after the 2025 Islamic Solidarity Games

Rank	Nation	Gold	Silver	Bronze	Total
1	Iran	24	15	13	52
2	Turkey	9	18	19	46
3	Uzbekistan	9	4	9	22
4	Morocco	8	6	13	27
5	Azerbaijan	7	6	8	21
6	Jordan	5	2	14	21
7	Indonesia	4	5	7	16
8	Saudi Arabia	2	3	6	11
9	Egypt	2	2	8	12
10	Qatar	1	1	1	3
11	Tunisia	1	0	8	9
12	Niger	1	0	2	3
13	Kazakhstan	0	3	6	9
14	Malaysia	0	1	9	10
15	Senegal	0	1	8	9
16	Lebanon	0	1	2	3
17	Afghanistan	0	1	1	2
17	Yemen	0	1	1	2
19	Libya	0	1	0	1
19	Palestine	0	1	0	1
19	Tajikistan	0	1	0	1
22	Ivory Coast	0	0	3	3
23	Bahrain	0	0	2	2
23	Iraq	0	0	2	2
25	Bangladesh	0	0	1	1
25	Burkina Faso	0	0	1	1
25	Nigeria	0	0	1	1
25	Suriname	0	0	1	1
Totals (28 entries)		73	73	146	292
