= Saudi Arabia at the Islamic Solidarity Games =

- IOC code: KSA
- NOC: SOPC
- Medals Ranked 8th: Gold 55 Silver 45 Bronze 68 Total 168

Islamic Solidarity Games appearances (overview)
- 2005; 2013; 2017; 2021; 2025

Saudi Arabia has competed in all editions of the Islamic Solidarity Games since its debut appearance at the inaugural event in Mecca in 2005. The Saudi Kingdom has organized the tournament twice, the inaugural Edition in Mecca in 2005 and most recently the 2025 Islamic Solidarity Games in Riyadh. As of 2025, figures reported by the Islamic Solidarity Sports Federation indicate that athletes from Saudi Arabia have earned a total of 168 medals, comprising 55 gold, 45 silver, and 68 bronze. In the overall standings, Saudis ranks 8th in the medal table following the most recent Islamic Solidarity Games, which were hosted in Riyadh, Saudi Arabia.

== Medal tables ==
=== Medals by Islamic Solidarity Games ===
Host nation

Below is the table representing all Saudis medals in the games. Until now, Saudi Arabia has won 168 medals (55 gold, 45 silver, and 68 bronze).

Games	Athletes	Gold	Silver	Bronze	Total	Rank	Notes	RF
(Saudi Arabia) 2005 Mecca		24	17	19	60	1st	details	
(Iran) 2010 Tehran	Canceled							
(Indonesia) 2013 Palembang		7	3	6	16	7th	details	
(Azerbaijan) 2017 Baku		4	1	6	11	11th	details	
(Turkey) 2021 Konya		2	12	10	24	15th	details	
(Saudi Arabia) 2025 Riyadh		18	12	27	57	4th	details	
(Malaysia) 2029 Selangor	Future event							
Total		55	45	68	168	8th	-	-

== See also ==
- Saudi Arabia at the Olympics
- Saudi Arabia at the Paralympics
- Saudi Arabia at the Asian Games
- Saudi Arabia at the Arab Games
- Sports in Saudi Arabia
