= Azerbaijan at the Islamic Solidarity Games =

- IOC code: AZE
- NOC: NOCRA
- Medals Ranked 3rd: Gold 114 Silver 99 Bronze 85 Total 298

Islamic Solidarity Games appearances (overview)
- 2005; 2013; 2017; 2021; 2025

Azerbaijan has participated at every celebration of the Islamic Solidarity Games Since the First Edition back in 2005 in Mecca. The Azerbaijanian has hosted the 2017 Islamic Solidarity Games in Baku and they finished the games at the top of the medal table. The Azerbaijanian athletes have won a total of 298 medals of whoom 114 gold, 99 silver, and 85 bronze which make them ranked third in alltime medal table just after Iran.

== Medal tables ==
=== Medals by Islamic Solidarity Games ===
Host nation

Below the table representing all Azerbaijanian medals in the games. Until now, Azerbaijan has won 298 medals (114 gold, 99 silver, and 85 bronze).

Games	Athletes	Gold	Silver	Bronze	Total	Rank	Notes	RF
(Saudi Arabia) 2005 Mecca		4	4	7	15	8	details	
(Iran) 2010 Tehran	Canceled							
(Indonesia) 2013 Palembang		6	9	9	24	8	details	
(Azerbaijan) 2017 Baku		75	50	37	162	1	details	
(Turkey) 2021 Konya		29	36	34	99	4	details	
(Saudi Arabia) 2025 Riyadh								
Total		114	99	85	298	3		

== See also ==
- Azerbaijan at the Olympics
- Azerbaijan at the Paralympics
- Azerbaijan at the Youth Olympics
- Azerbaijan at the European Games
- Azerbaijan at the Universiade
- Sports in Azerbaijan
