= Diving at the 2005 Islamic Solidarity Games =

Diving at the 2005 Islamic Solidarity Games was held in Swimming Pool of the General Presidency for Youth Welfare, King Abdullah Sport City, Jeddah from April 10 to April 11, 2005. Malaysia won both gold medals.

== Medalists ==
Event	Gold	Silver	Bronze
3 m springboard	Yeoh Ken Nee; Malaysia	Khairul Safwan Mansur; Malaysia	Yegor Ulizko; Kazakhstan
10 m platform	Bryan Nickson Lomas; Malaysia	Ilgiz Gatyatullin; Kazakhstan	Yegor Ulizko; Kazakhstan

== Medal table ==
Rank	Nation	Gold	Silver	Bronze	Total
1	Malaysia (MAS)	2	1	0	3
2	Kazakhstan (KAZ)	0	1	2	3
Totals (2 entries)		2	2	2	6
