= Algeria at the 2017 Islamic Solidarity Games =

- IOC code: ALG
- NOC: Algerian Olympic Committee

in Baku, Azerbaijan
- Competitors: 118
- Medals Ranked 6th: Gold 7 Silver 12 Bronze 21 Total 40

Islamic Solidarity Games appearances (overview)
- 2005; 2013; 2017; 2021; 2025

Algeria participated in the 2017 Islamic Solidarity Games held in Baku, Azerbaijan, from 12 to 22 May 2017. Algeria was represented by 118 athletes. The Algerian delegation won 40 medals and finished 6th in the overall medal table.

== Medal summary ==
=== Medal table ===
Medal	Name	Sport	Event	Date
Gold	Roumeissa Belabiod	Athletics	Women's long jump	May
Gold	Ratiba Tariket	Judo	Women's lightweight −57 kg	May
Gold	Oussama Sahnoune	Swimming	Men's 50 m freestyle	May
Gold	Oussama Sahnoune	Swimming	Men's 100 m freestyle	May
Gold	Souad Cherouati	Swimming	Women's 400 m freestyle	May
Gold	Souad Cherouati	Swimming	Women's 800 m freestyle	May
Gold	Souad Cherouati	Swimming	Women's 1500 m freestyle	May
Silver	Amina Bettiche	Athletics	Women's 3000 m steeplechase	May
Silver	Yousra Araar	Athletics	Women's high jump	May
Silver	Ahmed Anis Maoudj	Artistic gymnastics	Men's floor	May
Silver	Mohamed Bourguieg	Artistic gymnastics	Men's vault	May
Silver	Hillal Metidji	Artistic gymnastics	Men's parallel bars	May
Silver	Houd Zourdani	Judo	Men's half lightweight −66 kg	May
Silver	Abderrahmane Benamadi	Judo	Men's middleweight −90 kg	May
Silver	Nadjib Temmar	Judo	Men's heavyweight +100 kg	May
Silver	Abderrahmane Benamadi; Lyès Bouyacoub; Oussama Djeddi; Nadjib Temmar; Houd Zourdani	Judo	Men's team	May
Silver	Abdelatif Benkhaled	Karate	Men's Kumite −67 kg	May
Silver	Adbellah Ardjoune	Swimming	Men's 200 m backstroke	May
Silver	Amel Melih	Swimming	Women's 50 m freestyle	May
Bronze	Amine Belferar	Athletics	Men's 800 m	May
Bronze	Hichem Khalil Cherabi	Athletics	Men's pole vault	May
Bronze	Amina Bettiche	Athletics	Women's 1500 m	May
Bronze	Oussama Mordjane	Boxing	Men's flyweight 52 kg	May
Bronze	Men's football team U-23	Football	Men's tournament	May
Bronze	Oussama Djeddi	Judo	Men's lightweight −73 kg	May
Bronze	Lyès Bouyacoub	Judo	Men's heavyweight −100 kg	May
Bronze	Meriem Moussa	Judo	Women's half lightweight −52 kg	May
Bronze	Amina Belkadi	Judo	Women's half middleweight −63 kg	May
Bronze	Kaouthar Ouallal	Judo	Women's half heavyweight −78 kg	May
Bronze	Sonia Asselah	Judo	Women's heavyweight +78 kg	May
Bronze	Youcef Radjai	Blind judo	Men's lightweight −73 kg	May
Bronze	Imane Taleb	Karate	Women's Kumite −50 kg	May
Bronze	Imene Atif	Karate	Women's Kumite +68 kg	May
Bronze	Ramzi Chouchar	Swimming	Men's 200 m individual medley	May
Bronze	Amel Melih	Swimming	Women's 50 m backstroke	May
Bronze	Amel Melih	Swimming	Women's 100 m backstroke	May
Bronze	Men's volleyball team: Ilyas Achouri Sofiane Bouyoucef Ahmed Amir Kerboua Khaled Kessai Mohamed Amine Oumessad Ayoub Dekkiche Toufik Mahdjoubi Sadem Haddad Akram Dekkiche Amar Seifeddine Benmehana Mohamed Oualid Abi-Ayad Islam Ould Cherchali Billel Soualem Soufiane Hosni	Volleyball	Men's tournament	May
Bronze	Bachir Sid Azara	Wrestling	Men's Greco-Roman 80 kg	May
Bronze	Adem Boudjemline	Wrestling	Men's Greco-Roman 85 kg	May
Bronze	Chaima Yahiaoui	Wrestling	Women's freestyle 48 kg	May

Medals by sport
Sport	1st place, gold medalist(s)	2nd place, silver medalist(s)	3rd place, bronze medalist(s)	Total
Athletics	1	2	3	6
Boxing	0	0	1	1
Football	0	0	1	1
Gymnastics	0	3	0	3
Judo	1	4	7	12
Karate	0	1	2	3
Swimming	5	2	3	10
Volleyball	0	0	1	1
Wrestling	0	0	3	3
Total	7	12	21	40

Medals by gender
Gender	1st place, gold medalist(s)	2nd place, silver medalist(s)	3rd place, bronze medalist(s)	Total
Male	2	9	11	22
Female	5	3	10	18
Total	7	12	21	40

=== Athletes with most medals ===
Athlete	Sport	Gold medal	Silver medal	Bronze medal	Total
Souad Cherouati	Swimming	3	0	0	3
Amel Melih	Swimming	0	1	2	3
Oussama Sahnoune	Swimming	2	0	0	2
Nadjib Temmar	Judo	0	2	0	2
