= Karate at the Islamic Solidarity Games =

Karate at the Islamic Solidarity Games has been contested at every edition of the event. In 2005, men's events were contested and starting in 2013, both men's and women's events were contested. The sport was also contested at the 2022 Islamic Solidarity Games in Konya, Turkey.

== Editions ==
Games	Year	Host city	Host country	Events
I	2005	Mecca	Saudi Arabia	11
II	2010	Tehran	Iran	Cancelled
III	2013	Palembang	Indonesia	17
IV	2017	Baku	Azerbaijan	12
V	2022	Konya	Turkey	14
VI	2025	Riyadh	Saudi Arabia	12

== Medal table ==
Updated after the 2025 Islamic Solidarity Games

Rank	Nation	Gold	Silver	Bronze	Total
1	Iran	13	16	11	40
2	Azerbaijan	11	8	9	28
3	Turkey	10	13	18	41
4	Egypt	8	4	13	25
5	Morocco	4	6	9	19
6	Uzbekistan	4	1	4	9
7	Saudi Arabia	4	0	14	18
8	Kazakhstan	3	1	3	7
9	Kuwait	2	5	4	11
10	Jordan	2	2	5	9
11	Malaysia	2	2	2	6
12	Algeria	1	6	16	23
13	Tunisia	1	1	2	4
14	Indonesia	1	0	12	13
15	Pakistan	0	1	0	1
16	United Arab Emirates	0	0	3	3
17	Cameroon	0	0	1	1
17	Ivory Coast	0	0	1	1
17	Libya	0	0	1	1
17	Senegal	0	0	1	1
17	Syria	0	0	1	1
Totals (21 entries)		66	66	130	262
