= Kickboxing at the 2021 Islamic Solidarity Games – Results =

These are the results of the Kickboxing at the 2021 Islamic Solidarity Games which took place between 16 and 18 August 2022 in Konya, Turkey.

== Full contact ==
=== Men ===
==== 51 kg ====
Semifinals; 17 August		Final; 18 August
Bedirhan Ersayar (TUR)	3
Amil Mammadov (AZE)	0	Bedirhan Ersayar (TUR)	3
Sherali Musoev (UZB)	1	Aseed Al-Jaafreh (JOR)	0
Aseed Al-Jaafreh (JOR)	2

==== 54 kg ====
Quarterfinals; 17 August		Semifinals; 18 August		Final; 18 August
Yersultan Gazhden (KAZ)	1
Jamal Mammadov (AZE)	2	Jamal Mammadov (AZE)	3
Muzaffer Karabulut (TUR)	1	Saad Aissaoui (ALG)	0
Saad Aissaoui (ALG)	2			Jamal Mammadov (AZE)	0
Mohcine Boufar (MAR)	0			Mavlonbek Muhammadjonov (UZB)	3
Mavlonbek Muhammadjonov (UZB)	3	Mavlonbek Muhammadjonov (UZB)	2
		Omargeldi Nurgeldiýew (TKM)	1

==== 60 kg ====
Semifinals; 17 August		Final; 18 August
Seyit Battal Ay (TUR)	2
Ramiz Mammadov (AZE)	1	Seyit Battal Ay (TUR)	3
Lazizbek Begmatov (UZB)	0	Muhyeddin Osama (JOR)	0
Muhyeddin Osama (JOR)	3

==== 63.5 kg ====
Quarterfinals; 17 August		Semifinals; 18 August		Final; 18 August
Farid Aghamoghlanov (AZE)	3
Bekzod Nasretdinov (UZB)	0	Farid Aghamoghlanov (AZE)	3
Aday Abuhasoah (JOR)	2	Aday Abuhasoah (JOR)	0
Ferhat Yeniçerioğlu (TUR)	1			Farid Aghamoghlanov (AZE)	3
Mekan Begmämmedow (TKM)	0			Oussama El-Hichou (MAR)	0
Oussama El-Hichou (MAR)	3	Oussama El-Hichou (MAR)	3
		Batyrkhan Kuandykov (KAZ)	0

==== 67 kg ====
Quarterfinals; 16 August		Semifinals; 16 August		Final; 17 August
Suliman Al-Haddar (JOR)	0
Hamza Hattab (ALG)	3	Hamza Hattab (ALG)	0
Onerbek Selbay (KAZ)	0	Fakhriddin Eminov (UZB)	3
Fakhriddin Eminov (UZB)	3			Fakhriddin Eminov (UZB)	0
Amos Nouhoul (CMR)	0			Muhammed Süleyman Gülle (TUR)	3
Muhammed Süleyman Gülle (TUR)	3	Muhammed Süleyman Gülle (TUR)	3
Mohamed Yassine Mahssoun (MAR)	3	Mohamed Yassine Mahssoun (MAR)	0
Parvin Heydarov (AZE)	0

==== 71 kg ====
Quarterfinals; 16 August		Semifinals; 16 August		Final; 17 August
Jamoliddin Nosirov (UZB)	3
Ömer Faruk Gençkan (TUR)	0	Jamoliddin Nosirov (UZB)	2
Mohannad Al-Silawy (JOR)	3	Mohannad Al-Silawy (JOR)	1
Saeed Marzouq (KUW)	0			Jamoliddin Nosirov (UZB)	1
Akmyrat Akyýew (TKM)	0			Maxat Ussip (KAZ)	2
Maxat Ussip (KAZ)	3	Maxat Ussip (KAZ)	3
Hamza El-Haimer (MAR)	0	Elkhan Aliyev (AZE)	0
Elkhan Aliyev (AZE)	3

==== 75 kg ====
Semifinals; 17 August		Final; 18 August
Makhmud Khayotov (UZB)	3
Emre Yıldırım (TUR)	0	Makhmud Khayotov (UZB)	2
Sagi Salehli (AZE)	3	Sagi Salehli (AZE)	1
Salman Iothmanine (MAR)	0

==== 81 kg ====
Semifinals; 17 August		Final; 18 August
Davlatbek Rayimjonov (UZB)	1
Ali Khalaf Hasan (JOR)	2	Ali Khalaf Hasan (JOR)	0
Mahsum Teker (TUR)	3	Mahsum Teker (TUR)	3
Mazigh Ragueb (ALG)	0

==== 86 kg ====
Semifinals; 17 August		Final; 18 August
Hajymyrat Geldimämmedow (TKM)	1
Elvin Aghayev (AZE)	2	Elvin Aghayev (AZE)	0
Mukhammadyusuf Ganiev (UZB)	0	Emrah Yaşar (TUR)	3
Emrah Yaşar (TUR)	3

==== 91 kg ====
Quarterfinals; 17 August
Surat Garayev (AZE)	1
Khasankhon Baratov (UZB)	2
Jazzaa Al-Hussaini (KUW)	3
Yehya Sweidan (PLE)	0
Metin Yürük (TUR)	3
Oussama Mechegueg (ALG)	0

Semifinals; 18 August
Khasankhon Baratov (UZB)
Jazzaa Al-Hussaini (KUW)	WO
Metin Yürük (TUR)	3
Ibrahim Boudik (MAR)	0

Final; 18 August
Jazzaa Al-Hussaini (KUW)	0
Metin Yürük (TUR)	3

=== Women ===
==== 48 kg ====
Semifinals; 17 August		Final; 18 August
Hayriye Türksoy Hançer (TUR)	3
Oumaima Belouarrat (MAR)	0	Hayriye Türksoy Hançer (TUR)	3
Gulsanam Akmaljonova (UZB)	0	Dhekra Bendaas (ALG)	0
Dhekra Bendaas (ALG)	3

==== 52 kg ====
Semifinals; 17 August		Final; 18 August
Emine Arslan (TUR)	3
Shirinoy Zohidova (UZB)	0	Emine Arslan (TUR)	3
		Asmaa Er-Rakbi (MAR)	0

==== 56 kg ====
Quarterfinals; 17 August
Salma Ajebbour (MAR)	3
Khaoula Merzouk (ALG)	0

Semifinals; 18 August
Salma Ajebbour (MAR)	WO
Dilrabo Tairova (UZB)
Diandra Ariesta Pieter (INA)	0
Ayşe Karaca (TUR)	3

Final; 18 August
Salma Ajebbour (MAR)	2
Ayşe Karaca (TUR)	1

==== 60 kg ====
Semifinals; 17 August		Final; 18 August
Rima Raihane (MAR)	3
Munisa Koraboeva (UZB)	0	Rima Raihane (MAR)	2
		Büşra Demirayak (TUR)	1

==== 65 kg ====
Final; 18 August
Makhliyo Abdumannobova (UZB)	0
Gözde Nur Göktaş (TUR)	3

==== 70 kg ====
Semifinals; 17 August		Final; 18 August
Sabriye Gür (TUR)	3
Saida Lahmidi (MAR)	0	Sabriye Gür (TUR)	3
		Robiya Kuchkarova (UZB)	0

== Low kick ==
=== Men ===
==== 51 kg ====
Quarterfinals; 16 August		Semifinals; 16 August		Final; 17 August
Eziz Meredow (TKM)	1
Salih Samet Oruç (TUR)	2	Salih Samet Oruç (TUR)	0
Nazarbek Makhmudov (UZB)	3	Nazarbek Makhmudov (UZB)	3
Nihad Taghizade (AZE)	0			Nazarbek Makhmudov (UZB)	0
Rakhmanberdi Tulianbaev (KGZ)	0			Nursultan Zhumabayev (KAZ)	3
Nursultan Zhumabayev (KAZ)	3	Nursultan Zhumabayev (KAZ)	3
Mohammed Al-Saeedi (YEM)	2	Mohammed Al-Saeedi (YEM)	0
Kabaz Ahmed (ALG)	1

==== 54 kg ====
Quarterfinals; 16 August		Semifinals; 16 August		Final; 17 August
Atajan Atamyradow (TKM)	2
Timur Chuikov (KGZ)	1	Atajan Atamyradow (TKM)	3
Moussa Belmadi (ALG)	0	Yahya Sabhi (MAR)	0
Yahya Sabhi (MAR)	3			Atajan Atamyradow (TKM)	1
Bilal Dural (TUR)	3			Bilal Dural (TUR)	2
Mahmud Huseynov (AZE)	0	Bilal Dural (TUR)	3
		Olimjon Sultonov (UZB)	0

==== 57 kg ====
Quarterfinals; 17 August		Semifinals; 18 August		Final; 18 August
Ýazberdi Paýanow (TKM)	1
Anar Mammadov (AZE)	2	Anar Mammadov (AZE)	3
Abdellah Saadi (MAR)	0	Nurdaulet Kalshora (KAZ)	0
Nurdaulet Kalshora (KAZ)	3			Anar Mammadov (AZE)	2
Hatip Emlek (TUR)	3			Hatip Emlek (TUR)	1
Mirzakarim Mirzaev (UZB)	0	Hatip Emlek (TUR)	3
		Aziz Biikhurov (KGZ)	0

==== 60 kg ====
Quarterfinals; 16 August		Semifinals; 16 August		Final; 17 August
Ýalkap Aşyrmyradow (TKM)	0
Ali Ataberk Gürbüzcan (TUR)	3	Ali Ataberk Gürbüzcan (TUR)	3
Houssemeddine Ahmed Yahia (ALG)	3	Houssemeddine Ahmed Yahia (ALG)	0
Nodir Ernazarov (UZB)	0			Ali Ataberk Gürbüzcan (TUR)	3
Adilet Ulan Uulu (KGZ)	2			Adilet Ulan Uulu (KGZ)	0
Giyas Shahmardanov (AZE)	1	Adilet Ulan Uulu (KGZ)	2
		Ibrahim Juma (JOR)	1

==== 63.5 kg ====
Quarterfinals; 16 August		Semifinals; 16 August		Final; 18 August
Hamza Hmidache (MAR)	2
Dostonbek Ilashev (UZB)	1	Hamza Hmidache (MAR)	0
Berik Iskakov (KAZ)	2	Berik Iskakov (KAZ)	3
Rani Al-Khatib (LBN)	1			Berik Iskakov (KAZ)	2
Abdul Aziz (INA)	0			Mehmet Zeki Kaya (TUR)	1
Arzuman Gadimov (AZE)	3	Arzuman Gadimov (AZE)	1
Mehmet Zeki Kaya (TUR)	3	Mehmet Zeki Kaya (TUR)	2
Zineddine Cheboub (ALG)	0

==== 67 kg ====
Quarterfinals; 16 August		Semifinals; 16 August		Final; 17 August
Hamza Rachid (MAR)	0
Navruz Jumanazarov (UZB)	3	Navruz Jumanazarov (UZB)	2
Gasham Mammadov (AZE)	2	Gasham Mammadov (AZE)	1
Isaac Fokam (CMR)	1			Navruz Jumanazarov (UZB)	0
Mohammad Wasfi Eid (JOR)	0			Alikhan Ozdoyev (KAZ)	3
Muhammet Altybaýew (TKM)	3	Muhammet Altybaýew (TKM)	0
Alikhan Ozdoyev (KAZ)	2	Alikhan Ozdoyev (KAZ)	3
Emre Korkmaz (TUR)	1

==== 71 kg ====
Round of 16; 16 August
Berik Kalykov (KAZ)	0
Abror Khakimov (KGZ)	3

Quarterfinals; 16 August
Abror Khakimov (KGZ)	2
Goçmyrat Jumanyýazow (TKM)	1
Aydın Aslan (TUR)	3
Ryad Hamidani (ALG)	0
Abdelali Zahidi (MAR)	3
Saidmurod Khasanov (UZB)	0
Abdulaziz Murad (KUW)	0
Rahim Aliyev (AZE)	3

Semifinals; 16–17 August
Abror Khakimov (KGZ)	0
Aydın Aslan (TUR)	3
Abdelali Zahidi (MAR)	0
Rahim Aliyev (AZE)	3

Final; 17 August
Aydın Aslan (TUR)	2
Rahim Aliyev (AZE)	1

==== 75 kg ====
Quarterfinals; 17 August
Ünal Alkayış (TUR)	2
Temurbek Kholmatov (UZB)	1
Yslam Rahmetow (TKM)	0
Youssef Assouik (MAR)	3

Semifinals; 18 August
Ünal Alkayış (TUR)	3
Bourenane (ALG)	0
Youssef Assouik (MAR)	0
Ramal Aslanov (AZE)	3

Final; 18 August
Ünal Alkayış (TUR)	3
Ramal Aslanov (AZE)	0

==== 81 kg ====
Quarterfinals; 16 August		Semifinals; 16 August		Final; 17 August
Eljan Alkishiyev (AZE)	0
Fatih Erman (TUR)	3	Fatih Erman (TUR)	0
Haitham Al-Muallemi (YEM)	0	Ruslan Stepanov (KAZ)	3
Ruslan Stepanov (KAZ)	3			Ruslan Stepanov (KAZ)	0
René Mbong (CMR)				Serdar Mämmedow (TKM)	3
Serdar Mämmedow (TKM)	WO	Serdar Mämmedow (TKM)	3
Nurbek Urishboev (UZB)	3	Nurbek Urishboev (UZB)	0
Mohamed Hamdane (ALG)	0

==== 86 kg ====
Semifinals; 17 August		Final; 18 August
Murodbek Azimov (UZB)	3
Baybala Guliyev (AZE)	0	Murodbek Azimov (UZB)	0
Ferhat Arslan (TUR)	3	Ferhat Arslan (TUR)	3
Samir Meziane (ALG)	0

==== +91 kg ====
Quarterfinals; 16 August		Semifinals; 16 August		Final; 17 August
Khusankhon Baratov (UZB)	3
Othmane Fekkaki (MAR)	0	Khusankhon Baratov (UZB)	0
Zamanbek Abdikhay (KAZ)	0	Bahram Rajabzadeh (AZE)	3
Bahram Rajabzadeh (AZE)	3			Bahram Rajabzadeh (AZE)	3
Döwlet Ýuldaşew (TKM)	1			Kadir Yıldırım (TUR)	0
Mostafa Sharaf (PLE)	2	Mostafa Sharaf (PLE)	0
		Kadir Yıldırım (TUR)	3

=== Women ===
==== 52 kg ====
Quarterfinals; 17 August
Farida Abdullayeva (AZE)	1
Seham Al-Kharif (KUW)	2
Guljakhon Normatova (UZB)	0
Zeliha Doğan (TUR)	3

Semifinals; 18 August
Seham Al-Kharif (KUW)	2
Amanda La Loupatty (INA)	1
Zeliha Doğan (TUR)	0
Meriem El-Moubarik (MAR)	3

Final; 18 August
Seham Al-Kharif (KUW)	0
Meriem El-Moubarik (MAR)	3

==== 56 kg ====
Quarterfinals; 16 August
Aysu Devrishova (AZE)	2
Nora Abunab (PLE)	1

Semifinals; 16 August
Aysu Devrishova (AZE)	0
Feyzanur Azizoğlu (TUR)	3
Melaaz Ouali (ALG)	0
Romaysae Bouarourou (MAR)	3

Final; 17 August
Feyzanur Azizoğlu (TUR)	3
Romaysae Bouarourou (MAR)	0

==== 60 kg ====
Quarterfinals; 17 August
Dounia Mediouni (ALG)	2
Tulun Alakbarova (AZE)	1

Semifinals; 18 August
Dounia Mediouni (ALG)	0
Oumaima Belharcha (MAR)	3
Kübra Kocakuş (TUR)	3
Shara Khamzina (KAZ)	0

Final; 18 August
Oumaima Belharcha (MAR)	0
Kübra Kocakuş (TUR)	3

==== 65 kg ====
Quarterfinals; 17 August		Semifinals; 18 August		Final; 18 August
Kaouthar Baarab (MAR)	0
Chahinez Bouaïcha (ALG)	3	Chahinez Bouaïcha (ALG)	0
Esmira Mammadova (AZE)	0	Bediha Tacyıldız (TUR)	3
Bediha Tacyıldız (TUR)	3			Bediha Tacyıldız (TUR)	3
Shahnoza Sodikova (UZB)	0			Gülzada Jorakulyýewa (TKM)	0
Reine Kévine Kengni (CMR)	3	Reine Kévine Kengni (CMR)	1
Gülzada Jorakulyýewa (TKM)	3	Gülzada Jorakulyýewa (TKM)	2
Zhanar Atagullayeva (KAZ)	0
