= Intellectually Disabled Futsal at the 2005 Islamic Solidarity Games =

2005 Islamic Solidarity Games - Futsal for Intellectually Disabled (Men's)

Tournament details
- Host country: Saudi Arabia
- Dates: 9 April – 13 April
- Teams: 8 (from 2 confederations)
- Venue: 1 (in 1 host city)

Final positions
- Champions: Saudi Arabia (1st title)
- Runners-up: Iran
- Third place: Algeria
- Fourth place: Iraq

Tournament statistics
- Matches played: 16
- Goals scored: 166 (10.38 per match)

The men's futsal competition for intellectually disabled at the 2005 Islamic Solidarity Games took place from 9–13 April. All matches were played at the Abdel Aziz University Hall. It was won by the hosts Saudi Arabia who defeated Iran 5–2 in the final to clinch gold.

== Group stage ==
The group winners and runners up advanced to the semi-finals.

=== Group A ===
Team	Pld	W	D	L	GF	GA	GD	Pts
Saudi Arabia (H)	3	3	0	0	24	3	+21	9
Algeria	3	2	1	0	18	7	+11	6
Bahrain	3	1	1	1	8	21	-13	3
Egypt	3	0	0	3	3	22	-19	0

Full table on goalzz

9 April 2005
06:00

Bahrain	2–8	Algeria
	Report

Abdel Aziz University Hall, Jeddah
9 April 2005
13:30

Saudi Arabia	9–0	Egypt
	Report

Abdel Aziz University Hall, Jeddah

10 April 2005
06:00

Bahrain	4–3	Egypt
	Report

Abdel Aziz University Hall, Jeddah
10 April 2005
13:30

Saudi Arabia	5–1	Algeria
	Report

Abdel Aziz University Hall, Jeddah

11 April 2005
05:00

Saudi Arabia	10–2	Bahrain
	Report

Abdel Aziz University Hall, Jeddah
11 April 2005
13:30

Algeria	9–0	Egypt
	Report

Abdel Aziz University Hall, Jeddah

=== Group B ===
Team	Pld	W	D	L	GF	GA	GD	Pts
Iran	3	3	0	0	41	0	+41	9
Iraq	3	2	0	1	30	5	+25	6
Bangladesh	3	1	0	2	10	38	-28	3
Lebanon	3	0	0	3	2	40	-38	0

Full table on goalzz

9 April 2005
07:00

Lebanon	2–10	Bangladesh
	Report

Abdel Aziz University Hall, Jeddah
9 April 2005
15:00

Iraq	0–5	Iran
	Report

Abdel Aziz University Hall, Jeddah

10 April 2005
07:30

Iraq	17–0	Lebanon
	Report

Abdel Aziz University Hall, Jeddah
10 April 2005
15:00

Bangladesh	0–23	Iran
	Report

Abdel Aziz University Hall, Jeddah

11 April 2005
07:00

Lebanon	0–13	Iran
	Report

Abdel Aziz University Hall, Jeddah
11 April 2005
15:00

Bangladesh	0–13	Iraq
	Report

Abdel Aziz University Hall, Jeddah

== Knockout stage ==
Semifinals
12 April 2005 - Jeddah
Saudi Arabia	10
Iraq	0
12 April 2005 - Jeddah
Iran	5
Algeria	3

Gold medal play-off
13 April 2005 - Jeddah
Saudi Arabia	5
Iran	2
Bronze medal play-off
13 April 2005 - Jeddah
Algeria	3
Iraq	2

=== Semi-finals ===
12 April 2005

Saudi Arabia	10-0	Iraq
	Report

Abdel Aziz University Hall, Jeddah

12 April 2005

Iran	5–3	Algeria
	Report

Abdel Aziz University Hall, Jeddah

=== Bronze medal play-off ===
13 April 2005

Algeria	3–2	Iraq
	Report

Abdel Aziz University Hall, Jeddah

=== Gold medal play-off ===
13 April 2005

Saudi Arabia	5-2	Iran
	Report

Abdel Aziz University Hall, Jeddah
