= Goalball at the 2005 Islamic Solidarity Games =

- Venue: King Abdulaziz University Hall
- Location: Jeddah, Saudi Arabia
- Dates: 14–18 April 2005
- Teams: 14

Medalists
gold medal	Iran
silver medal	Algeria
bronze medal	Saudi Arabia / Iraq

The goalball competition for men at the 2005 Islamic Solidarity Games was contested from 14 April to 18 April at King Abdulaziz University Hall in Jeddah, Saudi Arabia. Iran defeated Algeria 7-3 in the final to clinch gold medal.

== Group stage ==
Qualified for the quarterfinals

=== Group A ===
Team	W	L	D	PF	PA	PD
Iran (IRI)	3	0	0	32	2	+30
Turkey (TUR)	2	1	0	21	14	+7
Senegal (SEN)	1	2	0	20	36	-16
Lebanon (LBN)	0	3	0	15	35	-20

14 April 2005
Iran	11-1	Turkey
Senegal	16-15	Lebanon
15 April 2005
Turkey	10-0	Lebanon
Iran	11-1	Senegal
16 April 2005
Senegal	3-10	Turkey
Lebanon	0-10	Iran

=== Group B ===
Team	W	L	D	PF	PA	PD
Saudi Arabia (KSA)	3	0	0	34	14	+20
Jordan (JOR)	2	1	0	19	17	+2
Egypt (EGY)	1	2	0	21	19	+2
Sudan (SUD)	0	3	0	11	35	-24

14 April 2005
Saudi Arabia	12-5	Egypt
Jordan	9-5	Sudan
15 April 2005
Egypt	10-0	Sudan
Saudi Arabia	6-3	Jordan
16 April 2005
Jordan	7-6	Egypt
Saudi Arabia	16-6	Sudan

=== Group C ===
Team	W	L	D	PF	PA	PD
Algeria (ALG)	2	0	0	22	3	+19
Syria (SYR)	1	1	0	9	14	-5
Qatar (QAT)	0	2	0	5	19	-14

14 April 2005
Syria	8-3	Qatar
15 April 2005
Algeria	11-2	Qatar
16 April 2005
Syria	1-11	Algeria

=== Group D ===
Team	W	L	D	PF	PA	PD
Iraq (IRQ)	2	0	0	24	5	+19
Bahrain (BRN)	1	1	0	11	18	-7
Kuwait (KUW)	0	2	0	6	18	-12

14 April 2005
Kuwait	5-7	Bahrain
15 April 2005
Iraq	11-1	Kuwait
16 April 2005
Bahrain	4-13	Iraq

=== Knockout round ===
Quarterfinals
Algeria	11
Bahrain	1
Iran	11
Jordan	1
Iraq	13
Syria	4
Saudi Arabia	5
Turkey	4

Semifinals
Saudi Arabia	3
Iran	8
Iraq	3
Algeria	6

Finals
Iran	7
Algeria	3
Third place
Saudi Arabia	1
Iraq	1

==== Quarter-finals ====
17 April 2005
Algeria	11-1	Bahrain
17 April 2005
Iran	11-1	Jordan
17 April 2005
Iraq	13-4	Syria
17 April 2005
Saudi Arabia	5-4	Turkey

==== Semi-finals ====
18 April 2005
Saudi Arabia	3-8	Iran
18 April 2005
Iraq	3-6	Algeria

==== Gold medal match ====
18 April 2005
Iran	7-3	Algeria

==== Bronze medal match ====
18 April 2005
Saudi Arabia	1-1	Iraq
