= TÜYAP Konya International Fair Center =

Convention center in Konya, Turkey

- ÜYAP Konya Uluslararası Fuar Merkezi
- Interactive map of the TÜYAP Konya International Fair Center area

General information
- Classification: Fair ground
- Location: Karatay, Konya, Fevzi Çakmak Mah., Turkey
- Coordinates: 37.93097°N 32.53636°E
- Owner: TÜYAP Fair & Exhibition Group

Technical details
- Floor area: 66,000 m^{3} (2,300,000 cu ft)
- Grounds: 86,000 m^{2} (930,000 sq ft)

Other information
- Parking: 6,000 vehicles

TÜYAP Konya International Fair Center (Turkish: TÜYAP Konya Uluslararası Fuar Merkezi) is an international trade fair and convention center of the fair organizer TÜYAP based in Konya, Turkey. The venue occasionally hosts also indoor sports events

The fair ground is locatedat Fevzi Çakmak neighborhood of Karatay district in Konya, Turkey. It has 66,000 m^{2} (710,000 sq ft) covered area and 20,000 m^{2} (220,000 sq ft) open-air exhibition area. It features press, VIP and administration rooms, two restaurants for 600 visitors in addition to three conference and meeting rooms with a seating capacity of 800. Its parking lot is capable of holding 6,000 vehicles. It has also a helipad.

== Trade fairs ==
Following is a list of trade fairs in 2022:

- Food
- Tomato Days Turkey
- İSKON - Logistics
- KONELEX - Electrics, Electronics, Electromechanics, Power Production, Automation
- KONMAK - Metalworking
- KONYASAC - Pipe and profile processing
- Agriculture
- Potato Days Turkey

== Sport events ==
During the 2021 Islamic Solidarity Games, the venue hosted table tennis, weightlifting and Bocce competitions.
