= Wrestling at the Islamic Solidarity Games =

Wrestling at the Islamic Solidarity Games has been contested at 2010(Cancelled) and 2017 edition of the event. The sport is expected to be contested at the upcoming 2022 Islamic Solidarity Games in Konya, Turkey.

== Editions ==
Games	Year	Host city	Host country	Events
II	2010	Tehran	Iran	Cancelled
IV	2017	Baku	Azerbaijan	24
V	2022	Konya	Turkey	30
VI	2025	Riyadh	Saudi Arabia	18

== Medal table ==
Updated after the 2025 Islamic Solidarity Games

Rank	Nation	Gold	Silver	Bronze	Total
1	Azerbaijan	22	19	16	57
2	Iran	21	5	16	42
3	Kyrgyzstan	13	9	10	32
4	Uzbekistan	6	8	18	32
5	Nigeria	5	3	0	8
6	Turkey	4	15	26	45
7	Kazakhstan	1	6	16	23
8	Bahrain	0	2	2	4
9	Tajikistan	0	1	2	3
10	Egypt	0	1	1	2
11	Albania	0	1	0	1
11	Guinea	0	1	0	1
11	Ivory Coast	0	1	0	1
14	Algeria	0	0	6	6
15	Turkmenistan	0	0	4	4
16	Iraq	0	0	2	2
16	Pakistan	0	0	2	2
16	Tunisia	0	0	2	2
19	Bangladesh	0	0	1	1
19	Cameroon	0	0	1	1
19	Guinea-Bissau	0	0	1	1
19	Qatar	0	0	1	1
Totals (22 entries)		72	72	127	271
