= Algeria at the 2013 Islamic Solidarity Games =

- IOC code: ALG
- NOC: Algerian Olympic Committee

in Palembang, Indonesia
- Competitors: 78
- Medals Ranked 9th: Gold 5 Silver 6 Bronze 8 Total 19

Islamic Solidarity Games appearances (overview)
- 2005; 2013; 2017; 2021; 2025

Algeria participated in the 2013 Islamic Solidarity Games held in Palembang, Indonesia, from 22 September to 1 October 2013. Algeria was represented by 78 athletes. The Algerian delegation won 19 medals and finished 9th in the overall medal table.

== Medal summary ==
=== Medal table ===
Medal	Name	Sport	Event	Date
Gold	Abdelmalik Lahoulou	Athletics	Men's 400 m hurdles	September
Gold	Amina Bettiche	Athletics	Women's 3000 m steeplechase	September
Gold	Abdelkrim Bouamria	Karate	Men's Kumite −60 kg	September
Gold	Oussama Sahnoune	Swimming	Men's 50 m freestyle	September
Gold	Oussama Sahnoune	Swimming	Men's 100 m freestyle	September
Silver	Kenza Dahmani	Athletics	Women's 10000 m	September
Silver	Djaâfer Islam Mehdi	Karate	Men's Individual kata	September
Silver	Yasmine Mouloud; Selma Bedja; Kamelia Hadj Saïd	Karate	Women's Team kata	September
Silver	Oussama Sahnoune; Badis Djendouci; Nazim Belkhodja; Ryad Djendouci	Swimming	Men's 4 × 100 m freestyle relay	September
Silver	Mohamed Hassen	Tennis	Men's Singles	September
Silver	Abdelhakim Moumou	Wushu	Men's sanda 70 kg	
Bronze	Miloud Laredj	Athletics	Men's 400 m	September
Bronze	Miloud Laredj; Lyes Sabri; Abdelmalik Lahoulou; Mohamed Belbachir	Athletics	Men's 4 × 400 m relay	September
Bronze	Missipsa Hamadini	Karate	Men's Kumite +84 kg	September
Bronze	Zahira Abdelkader	Karate	Women's Kumite −68 kg	September
Bronze	Souad Cherouati	Swimming	Women's 1500 m freestyle	September
Bronze	Amira Kouza	Swimming	Women's 50 m breaststroke	September
Bronze	Meziane Rebbouh	Wushu	Men's sanda 52 kg	
Bronze	Ramzi Benabdellah	Wushu	Men's sanda 65 kg	

Medals by sport
Sport	1st place, gold medalist(s)	2nd place, silver medalist(s)	3rd place, bronze medalist(s)	Total
Athletics	2	1	2	5
Karate	1	2	2	5
Swimming	2	1	2	5
Tennis	0	1	0	1
Wushu	0	1	2	3
Total	5	6	8	19

Medals by gender
Gender	1st place, gold medalist(s)	2nd place, silver medalist(s)	3rd place, bronze medalist(s)	Total
Male	4	4	5	13
Female	1	2	3	6
Total	5	6	8	19

=== Athletes with most medals ===
Athlete	Sport	Gold medal	Silver medal	Bronze medal	Total
Oussama Sahnoune	Swimming	2	1	0	3
Abdelmalik Lahoulou	Athletics	1	0	1	2
