= Bocce at the 2021 Islamic Solidarity Games =

Bocce competition

- Venue: TÜYAP Konya International Fair Center
- Dates: 9–12 August 2022
- Competitors: 39 from 6 nations

The Bocce event at the 2021 Islamic Solidarity Games was held in Konya, Turkey, from 9 to 12 August 2022.

The Games were originally scheduled to take place from 20 to 29 August 2021 at the TÜYAP Konya International Fair Center in Konya, Turkey. In May 2020, the Islamic Solidarity Sports Federation (ISSF), who are responsible for the direction and control of the Islamic Solidarity Games, postponed the games as the 2020 Summer Olympics were postponed to July and August 2021, due to the global COVID-19 pandemic.

== Medal table ==
| Rank | Nation | Gold | Silver | Bronze | Total |
|---|---|---|---|---|---|
| 1 | Turkey (TUR) | 4 | 5 | 1 | 10 |
| 2 | Algeria (ALG) | 3 | 4 | 3 | 10 |
| 3 | Morocco (MAR) | 2 | 1 | 7 | 10 |
| 4 | Libya (LBA) | 1 | 0 | 3 | 4 |
| Totals (4 entries) | | 10 | 10 | 14 | 34 |

== Medalists ==
=== Lyonnaise ===
| Event | Gold | Silver | Bronze |
|---|---|---|---|
| Men's precision shooting | Mohamed Bachir Mokhtari; Algeria | Faik Dursun Öztürk; Turkey | Ali El-Segher; Libya |
| Men's precision shooting | Mohamed Bachir Mokhtari; Algeria | Faik Dursun Öztürk; Turkey | Yassine Ouinaksi; Morocco |
| Men's progressive shooting | Mehmet Can Yakın; Turkey | Mohamed Benslim; Algeria | Saad Arguiel; Morocco |
| Men's progressive shooting | Mehmet Can Yakın; Turkey | Mohamed Benslim; Algeria | Ali El-Segher; Libya |
| Women's precision shooting | Fatiha Targhaoui; Morocco | Kamilia Kadour; Algeria | Neşe Şahin; Turkey |
| Women's progressive shooting | İnci Ece Öztürk; Turkey | Celia Afenaï; Algeria | Bouchra Lefhal El-Alaoui; Morocco |
| Mixed relay | Turkey; Burak Altay; Necla Şahin | Algeria; Mohamed Lamine Chachoua; Celia Afenaï | Morocco; Saad Arguiel; Bouchra Lefhal El-Alaoui |

=== Raffa ===
| Event | Gold | Silver | Bronze |
|---|---|---|---|
| Men's singles | Rashed Al-Swesi; Libya | Oğuzhan Turhan; Turkey | Abdeljalil El-Moustafid; Morocco |
| Men's singles | Rashed Al-Swesi; Libya | Oğuzhan Turhan; Turkey | Ali Hakim; Algeria |
| Men's doubles | Morocco; Abdeljalil El-Moustafid; Yassine Ouinaksi | Turkey; Cem Şimşek; Erdal Kantemir | Algeria; Ali Hakim; Ahmed Triaki |
| Men's doubles | Morocco; Abdeljalil El-Moustafid; Yassine Ouinaksi | Turkey; Cem Şimşek; Erdal Kantemir | Libya; Rashed Al-Swesi; Abdulmohaimen Zantoute |
| Women's singles | Rukiye Varol; Turkey | Sara El-Mzamzi El-Idrissi; Morocco | Lamia Aissioui; Algeria |
| Women's doubles | Algeria; Lamia Aissioui; Chahrazad Chiban | Turkey; Bahar Çil; Esile Emen | Morocco; Sara El-Mzamzi El-Idrissi; Dounia Aitoutouhen |
| Mixed doubles | Algeria; Tarek Zekiri; Besma Boukarnafa | Turkey; Cem Şimşek; Esile Emen | Morocco; Mohamed Reda Saoud; Dounia Aitoutouhen |

== Participating nations ==
A total of 39 athletes from 6 nations competed in bocce at the 2021 Islamic Solidarity Games:

- Algeria (11)
- Libya (3)
- Morocco (8)
- Niger (3)
- Senegal (2)
- Turkey (12)

== Gallery ==
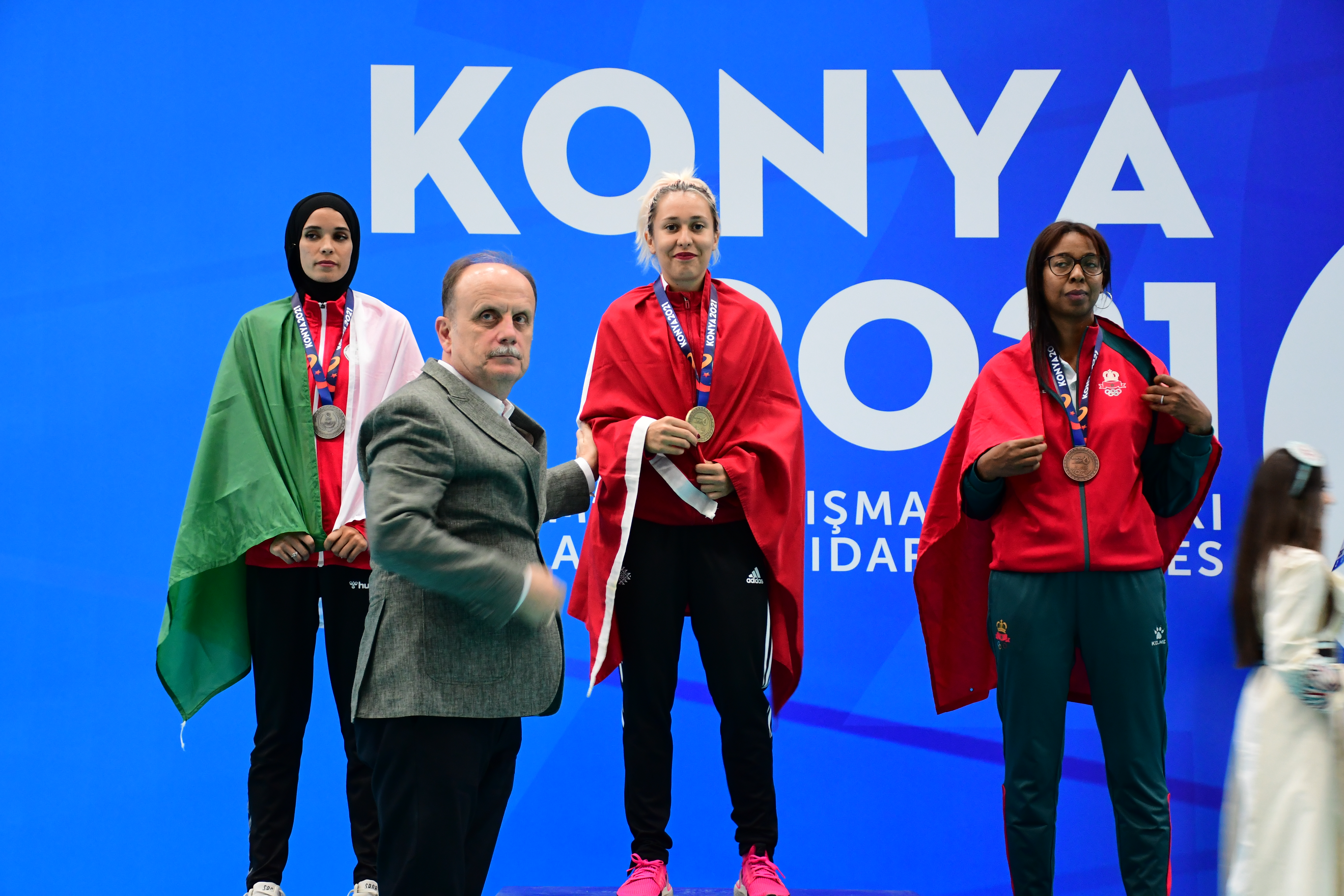
Women Bocce Medal Ceremony

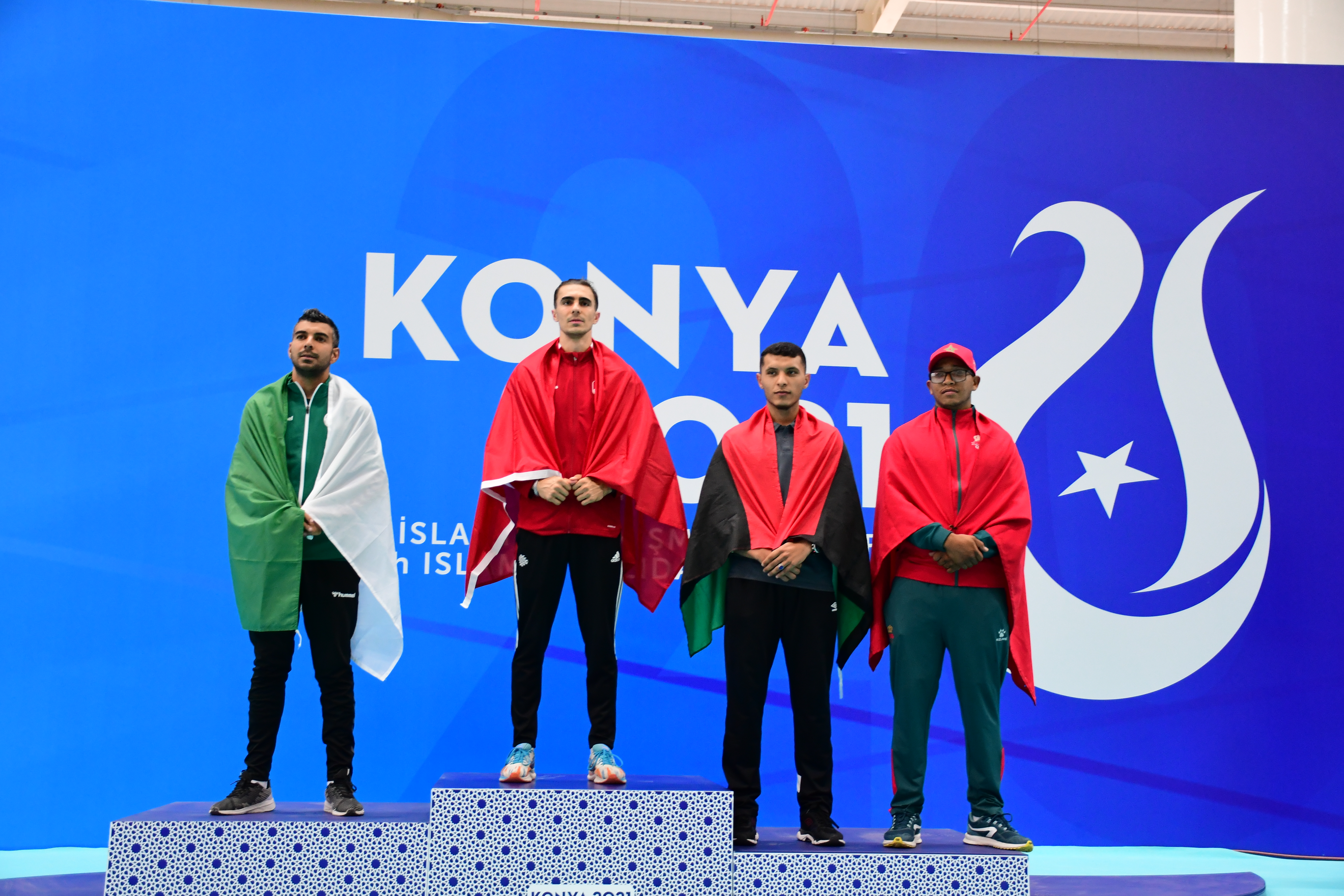
Men Bocce Medal Ceremony

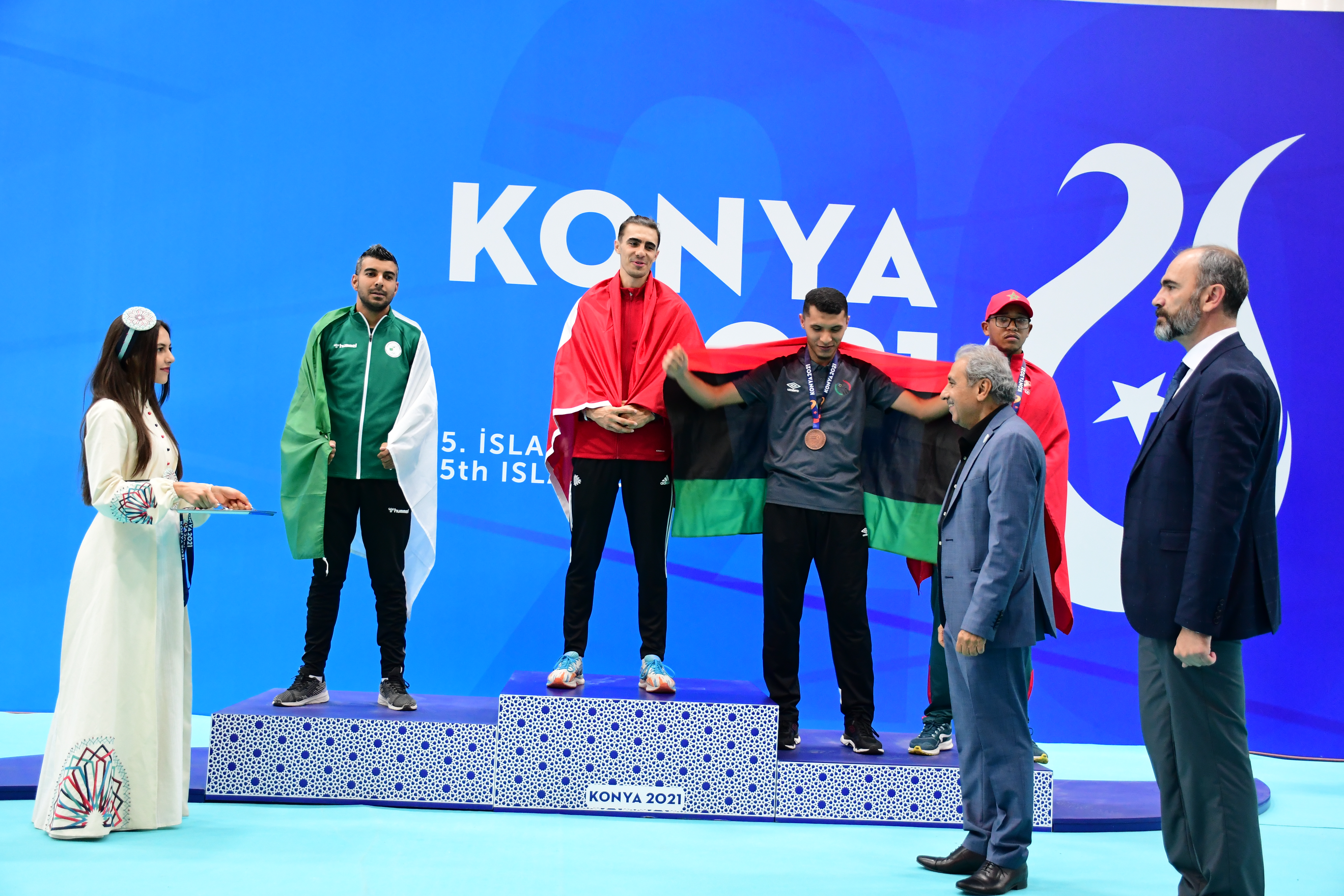
Men Bocce Medal Ceremony

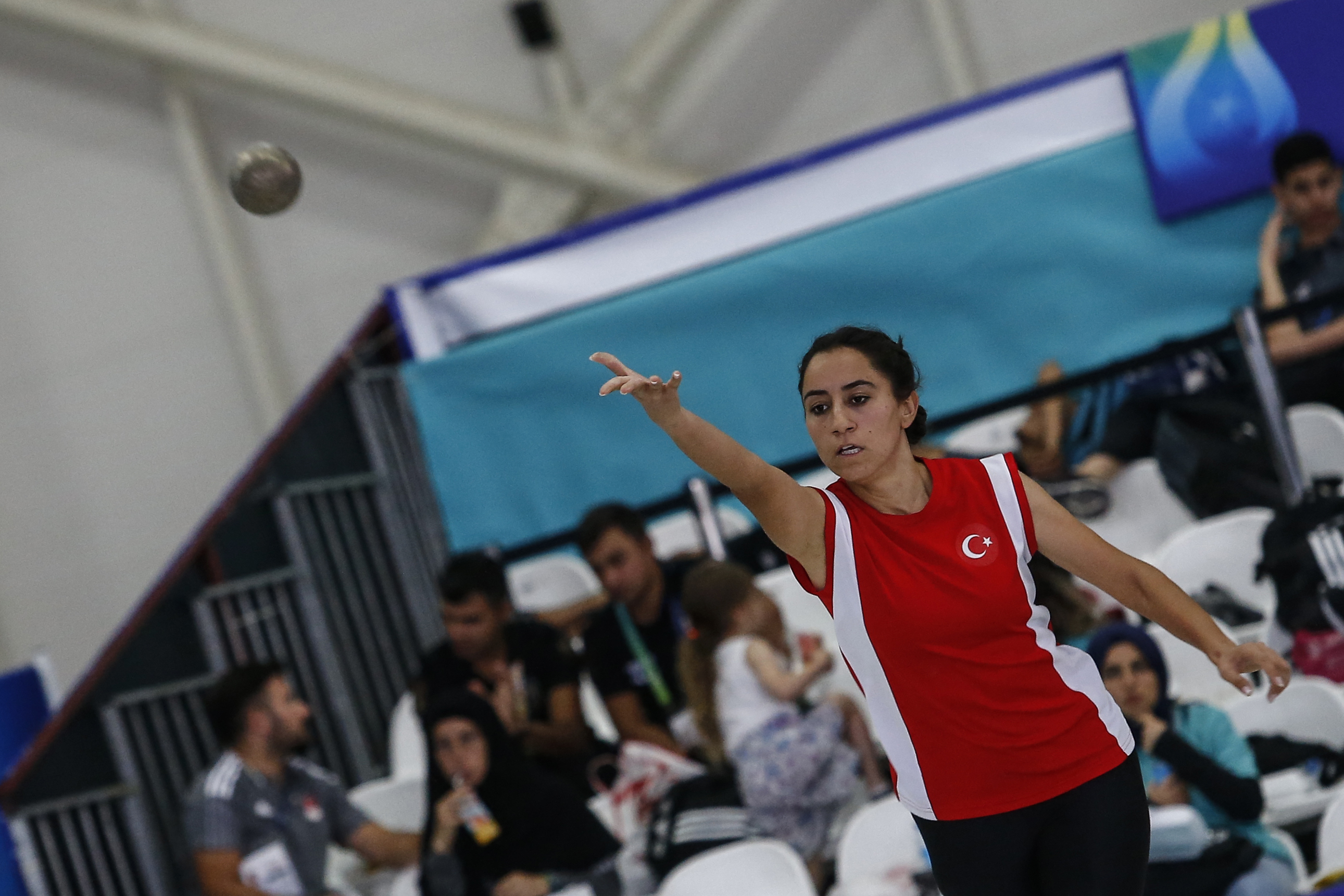
Women Bocce Turkey

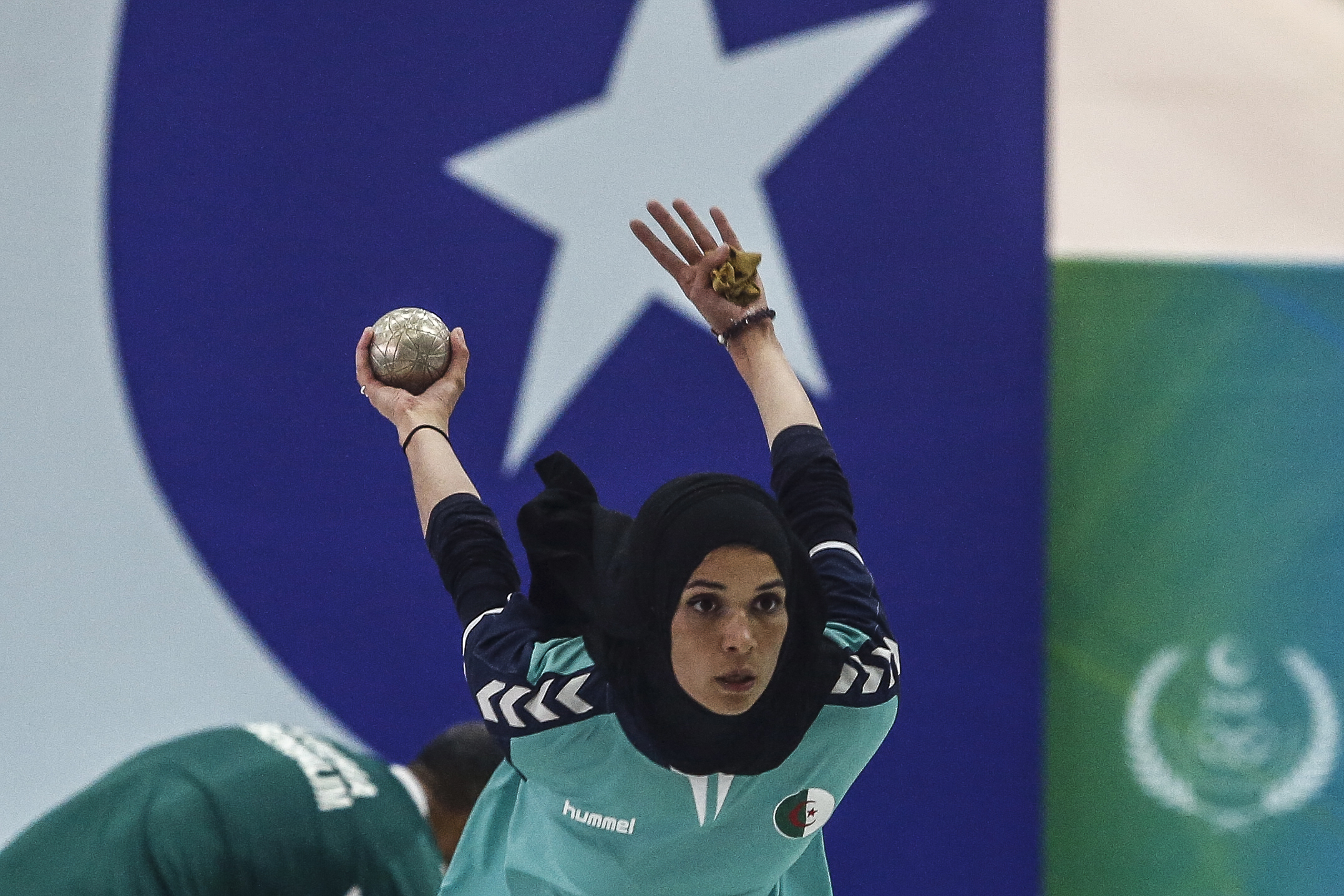
Women Bocce Algeria

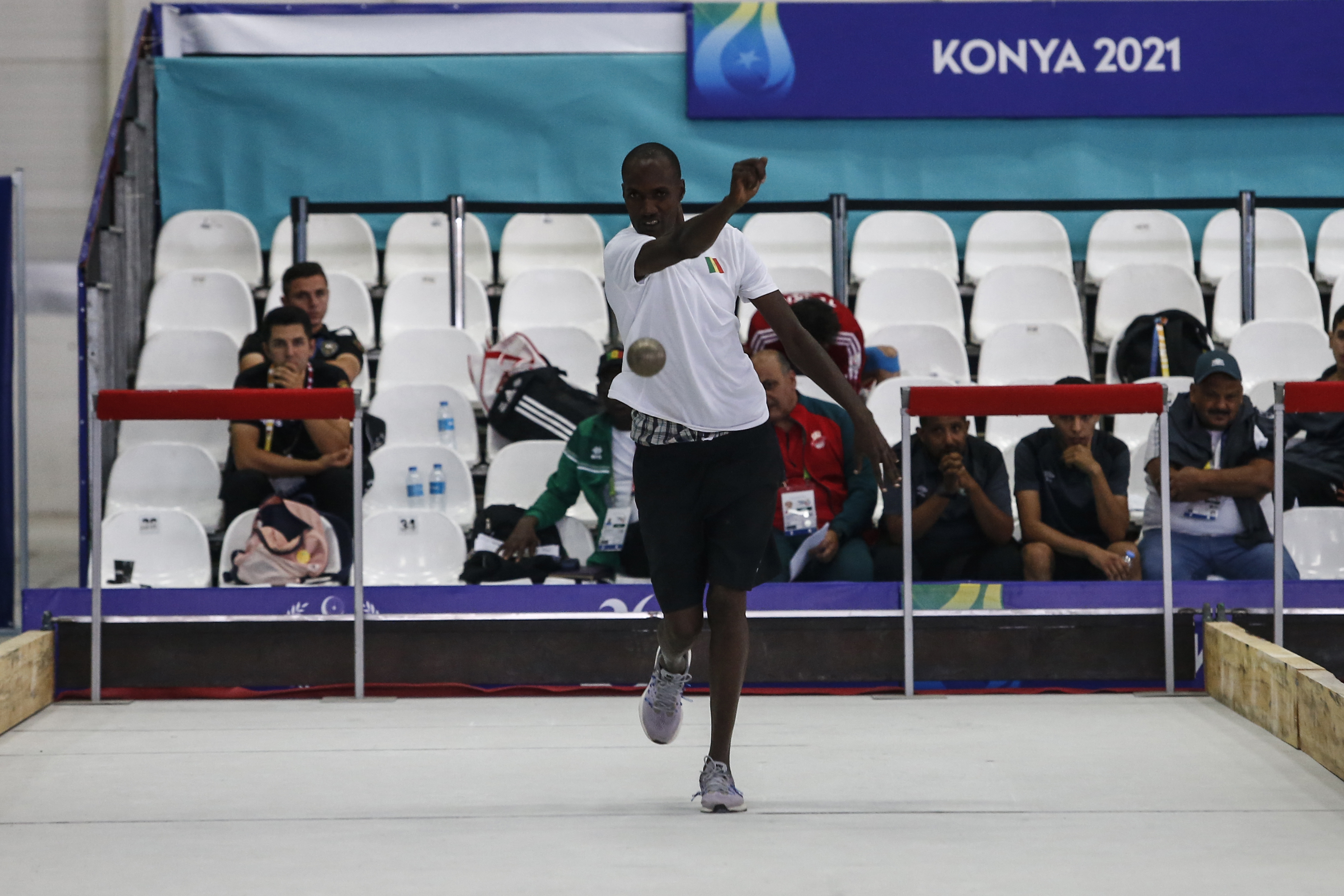
Men Bocce

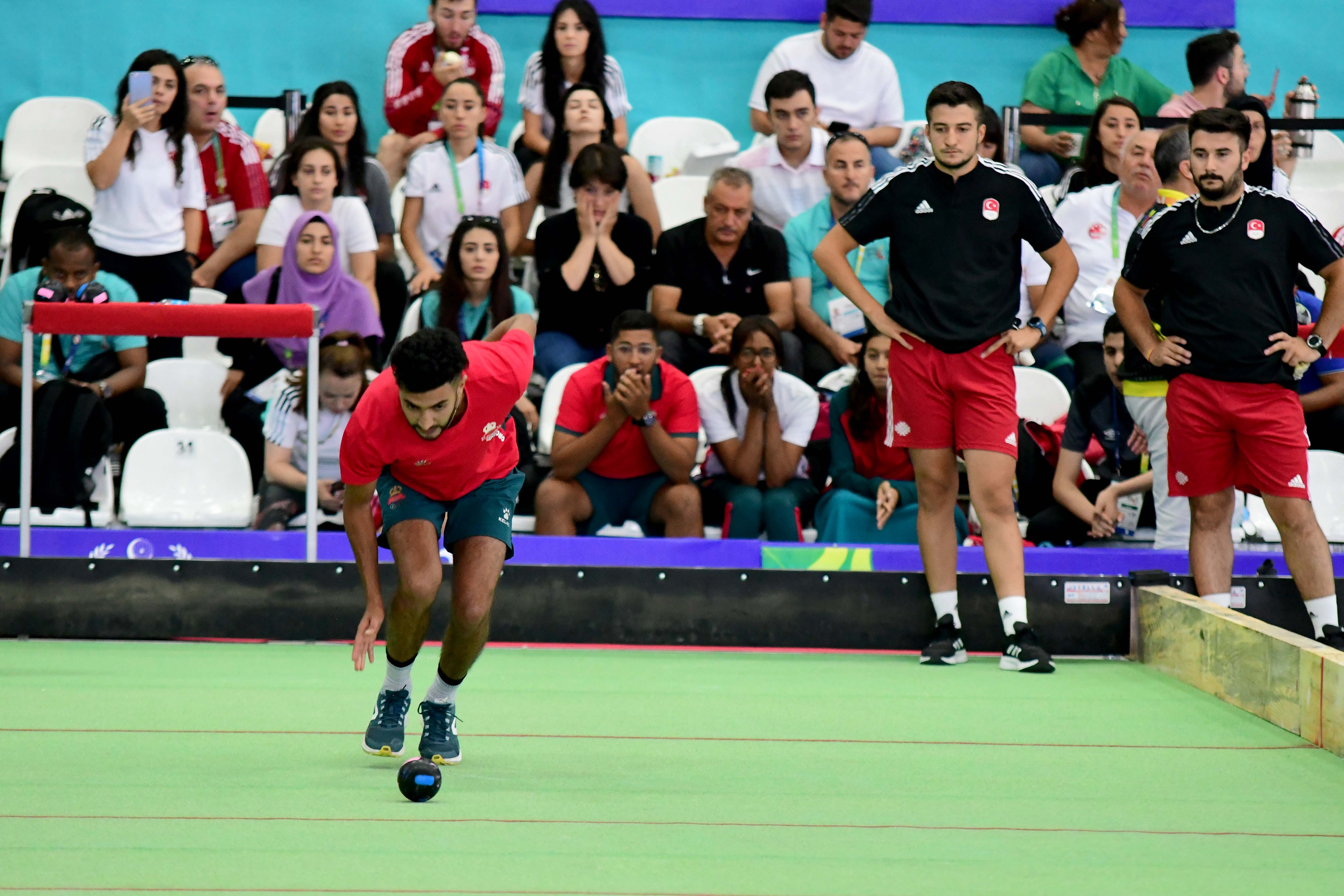
Men Bocce

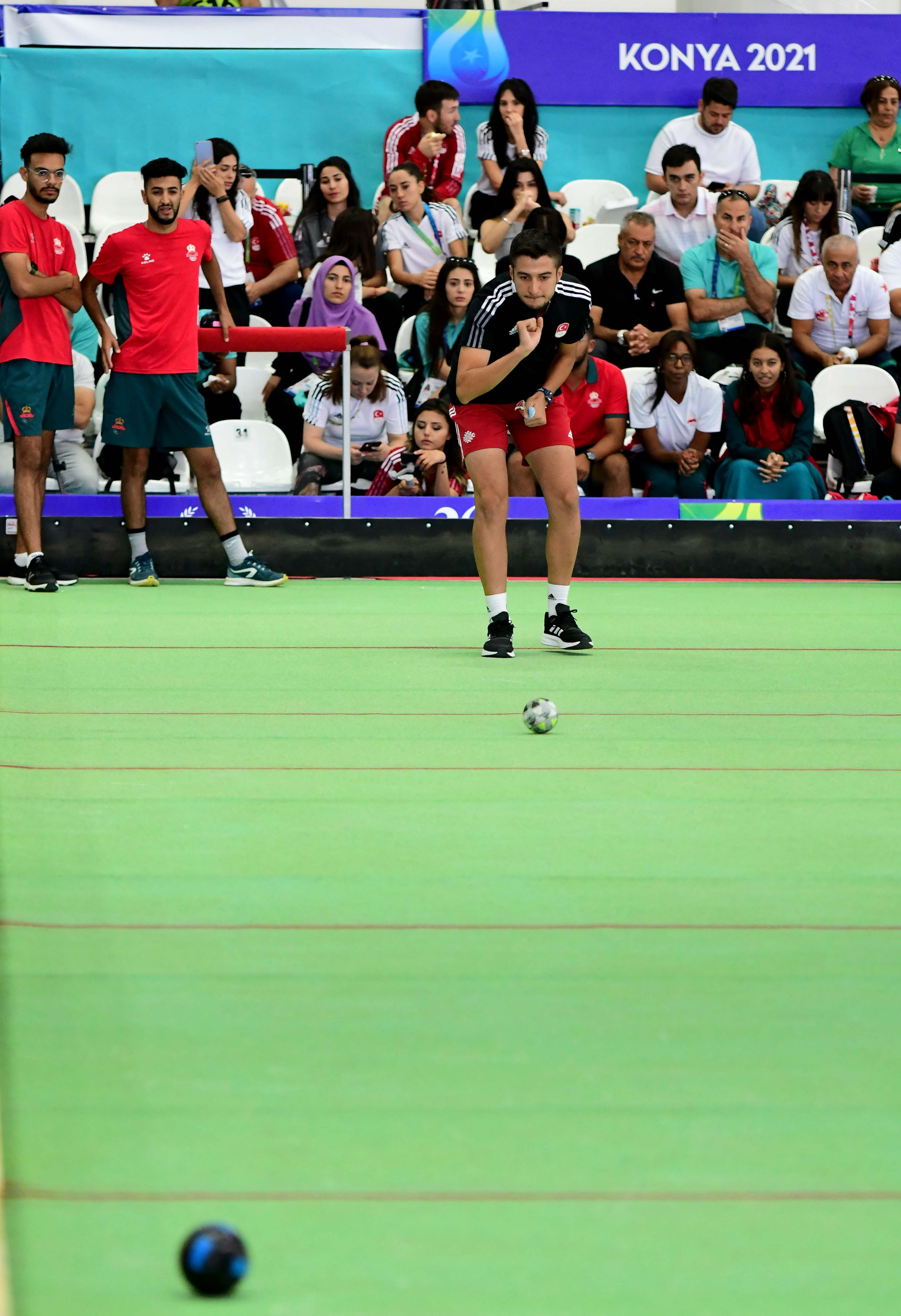
Men Bocce

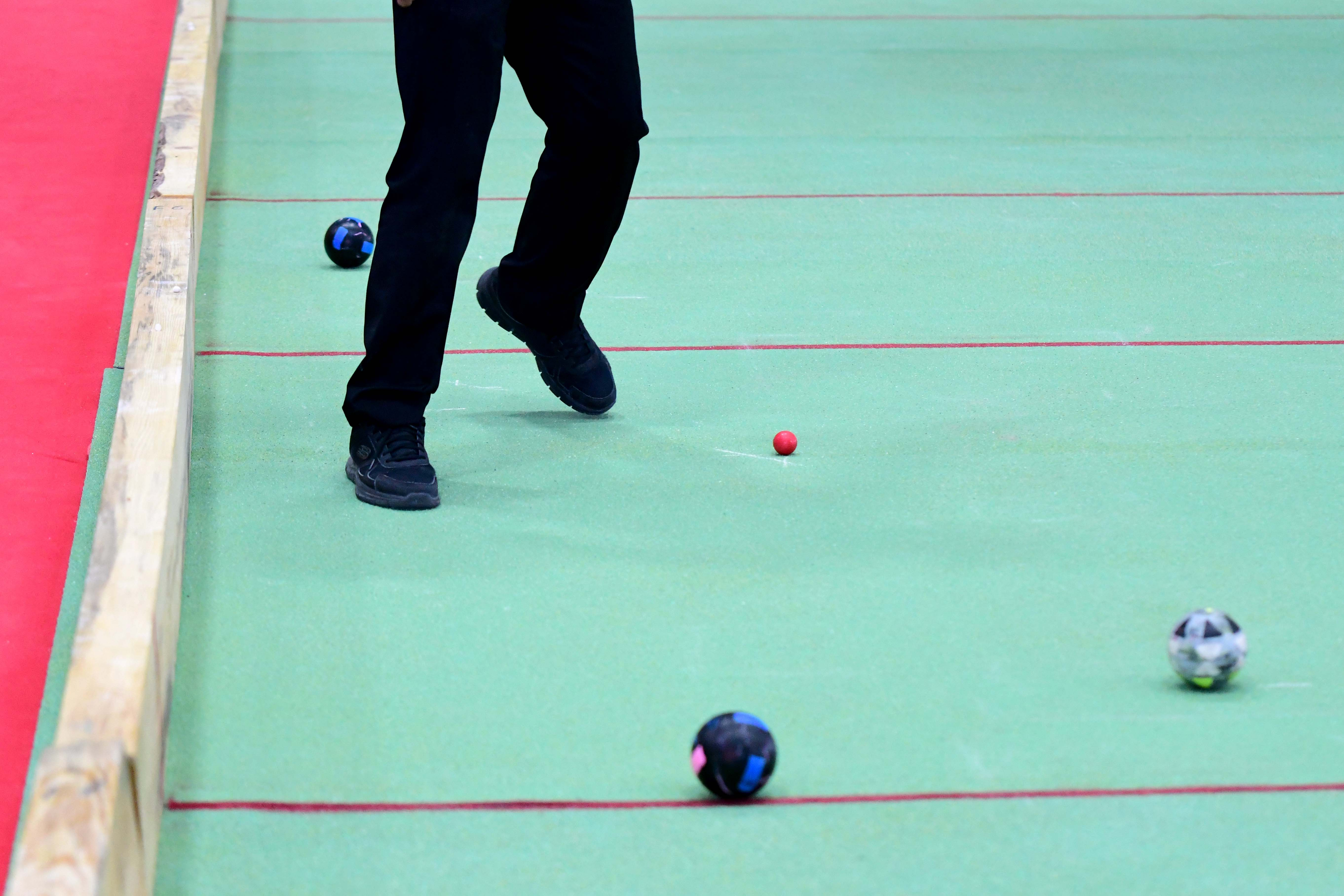
Men Bocce
