= Algeria at the 2021 Islamic Solidarity Games =

- IOC code: ALG
- NOC: Algerian Olympic Committee

in Konya, Turkey
- Competitors: 147
- Medals: Gold 7 Silver 12 Bronze 23 Total 42

Islamic Solidarity Games appearances (overview)
- 2005; 2013; 2017; 2021; 2025

Algeria participated in the 2021 Islamic Solidarity Games held in Konya, Turkey from 9 to 18 August 2022.

The games had been rescheduled several times. In May 2021, the ISSF postponed the event to August 2022 citing the COVID-19 pandemic situation in the participating countries.

== Medalists ==
Medal	Name	Sport	Event	Date
Gold	Amine Bouanani	Athletics	Men's 110 metres hurdles	11 August
Gold	Mohamed Bachir Mokhtari	Bocce	Men's lyonnaise precision shooting	12 August
Gold	Lamia Aissioui; Chahrazad Chiban	Bocce	Women's raffa double	12 August
Gold	Tarek Zekiri; Besma Boukarnafa	Bocce	Men's raffa double	12 August
Gold	Amina Belkadi	Judo	Women's 63 kg	15 August
Gold	Jaouad Syoud	Swimming	Men's 200 m individual medley	14 August
Gold	Jaouad Syoud	Swimming	Men's 400 m individual medley	15 August
Silver	Miloud Laredj; Es Saddik Hammouni Anas; Abdennour Bendjemaa; Abdelmalik Lahoulou	Athletics	Men's 4 × 400 metres relay	12 August
Silver	Mohamed Benslim	Bocce	Men's lyonnaise progressive shooting	12 August
Silver	Kamilia Kadour	Bocce	Women's lyonnaise progressive shooting	12 August
Silver	Celia Afenaï	Bocce	Women's lyonnaise progressive shooting	12 August
Silver	Celia Afenaï; Mohamed Lamine Chachoua	Bocce	Lyonnaise mixed relay	12 August
Silver	Youcef Reguigui	Cycling	Men's Road Race	13 August
Silver	Yamina Halata	Judo	Women's 57 kg	15 August
Silver	Sonia Asselah	Judo	Women's +78 kg	16 August
Silver	Cylia Ouikene	Karate	Women's 50 kg	17 August
Silver	Louiza Abouriche	Karate	Women's 55 kg	17 August
Silver	Jaouad Syoud	Swimming	Men's 200 m butterfly	15 August
Silver	Dhekra Bendaas	Kickboxing	Women's full contact 48 kg	18 August
Bronze	Zouina Bouzebra	Athletics	Women's hammer throw	8 August
Bronze	Oussama Khennoussi	Athletics	Men's discus throw	8 August
Bronze	Abdelmalik Lahoulou	Athletics	Men's 400 m hurdles	9 August
Bronze	Salim Keddar	Athletics	Men's 1500 m	9 August
Bronze	Ali Hakim	Bocce	Men's raffa singles	12 August
Bronze	Ali Hakim; Ahmed Triaki	Bocce	Men's raffa double	12 August
Bronze	Lamia Aissioui	Bocce	Women's raffa singles	12 August
Bronze	Imene Rezzoug	Judo	Women's 48 kg	15 August
Bronze	Kaouthar Ouallal	Judo	Women's 78 kg	16 August
Bronze	Algeria's national judo team	Judo	Women's team	17 August
Bronze	Aïcha Narimane Dahlab; Sarah Hanouti; Rayane Salakedji	Karate	Women's team kata	17 August
Bronze	Hocine Daikhi	Karate	Men's +84 kg	18 August
Bronze	Zitouni Eddine	Karate	Men's 84 kg	18 August
Bronze	Ayoub Anis Helassa	Karate	Men's 60 kg	18 August
Bronze	Saad Aissaoui	Kickboxing	Men's full contact 54 kg	18 August
Bronze	Hamza Hattab	Kickboxing	Men's full contact 67 kg	18 August
Bronze	Mazigh Ragueb	Kickboxing	Men's full contact 81 kg	18 August
Bronze	Houssemeddine Ahmed Yahia	Kickboxing	Men's low kick 60 kg	18 August
Bronze	Bourenane Bourenane	Kickboxing	Men's low kick 75 kg	18 August
Bronze	Samir Meziane	Kickboxing	Men's low kick 86 kg	18 August
Bronze	Melaaz Ouali	Kickboxing	Women's low kick 56 kg	18 August
Bronze	Dounia Mediouni	Kickboxing	Women's low kick 60 kg	18 August
Bronze	Chahinez Bouaïcha	Kickboxing	Women's low kick 65 kg	18 August

Medals by sport
Sport	1st place, gold medalist(s)	2nd place, silver medalist(s)	3rd place, bronze medalist(s)	Total
Athletics	1	1	4	6
Bocce	3	4	3	10
Judo	1	2	3	6
Karate	0	2	4	6
Road Cycling	0	1	0	1
Swimming	2	1	0	3
Kickboxing	0	1	9	10
Total	7	12	23	42

== Football ==
Summary

Team	Event	Group stage				Semifinal	Final / BM	
Team	Event	Opposition Score	Opposition Score	Opposition Score	Rank	Opposition Score	Opposition Score	Rank
Algeria U-23 men's	Men's tournament	Cameroon; 3–0 (w/o)	Senegal; D 1–1	Turkey; D 1–1	2	Saudi Arabia; L 1–2	Azerbaijan; L 0–0; 3-4	4

Group A

Pos	Team	Pld	W	D	L	GF	GA	GD	Pts	Qualification
1	Turkey (H)	3	2	1	0	5	3	+2	7	Advance to knockout stage
2	Algeria	3	1	2	0	5	2	+3	5	Advance to knockout stage
3	Senegal	3	1	1	1	3	2	+1	4	
4	Cameroon	3	0	0	3	2	8	−6	0	

(H) Hosts
8 August 2022
12:30

Algeria	3–0 (w/o)	Cameroon

Konya

10 August 2022
16:00

Senegal	1–1	Algeria
Sambou 63'		Bekkouche 84' (pen.)

Konya

12 August 2022
16:00

Turkey	1–1	Algeria
Cherifi 13' (o.g.)		Temine 19'

Konya

Semifinals

14 August 2022
17:00

Saudi Arabia	2–1	Algeria
Asiri 14'; Al-Ghamdi 20'		Bekkouche 37' (pen.)

Cumhuriyet Stadium, Konya

Bronze medal match

16 August 2022
14:00

Azerbaijan	0–0 (a.e.t.)	Algeria
Penalties
	4–3

Cumhuriyet Stadium, Konya

== Wrestling ==
Men's freestyle

Athlete	Event	Round of 16	Quarterfinal	Semifinal	Repesaj	Final / BM	
Athlete	Event	Opposition Result	Opposition Result	Opposition Result	Opposition Result	Opposition Result	Rank
Abdelhak Kherbache	61 kg	Bye	Aburumaila (PLE); L 5-15	did not advance			8
Ikkal Abdelkader	74 kg	Bye	Çarlyýew (TKM); W 8-2	Bayramov (AZE); L 0-10	—N/a	Navruzov (UZB); L 4-10	5
Fetairia Eddine Chems	79 kg	Akdeniz (TUR); L 0-10	—N/a		Daghash (PLE); W 10-0	Abdurakhmonov (UZB); L 0-10	5
Fateh Benferdjallah	86 kg	—N/a	Bouba (CHA); W 10-0	Karimi (IRI); L 0-10	—N/a	Karypbaev (KGZ); L 3-3	5

Men's Greco-Roman

Athlete	Event	Round of 16	Quarterfinal	Semifinal	Repesaj	Final / BM	
Athlete	Event	Opposition Result	Opposition Result	Opposition Result	Opposition Result	Opposition Result	Rank
Abdelkarim Fergat	60 kg	Hawsawi (KSA); W 8-0	Karakuş (TUR); L 3-5	did not Advanced			7
Abdeldjbar Djebbari	63 kg	Bye	Sharshenbekov (KGZ); L 1-9	—N/a		Açilow (TKM); L 3-6	5
Ishak Ghaiou	67 kg	Atabaev (UZB); L 3-7	did not Advanced				8
Adem Boudjemline	97 kg	Dzhuzupbekov (KGZ); L 10-1	—N/a		Kurrayev (TKM); W 3-7	Bali (IRI); L 0-4	5

== Weightlifting ==
Results

Athlete	Event	Snatch		Clean & Jerk		Total	Result
Athlete	Event	Result	Rank	Result	Rank	Total	Result
Fenni Amor	Men's -61kg	115	7	142	7	257	7
Touairi Aymen	Men's -102kg	162	7	197	8	359	8
