= Islamic Solidarity Games =

Multinational multi-sport event

Islamic Solidarity Games ألعاب التضامن الإسلامي
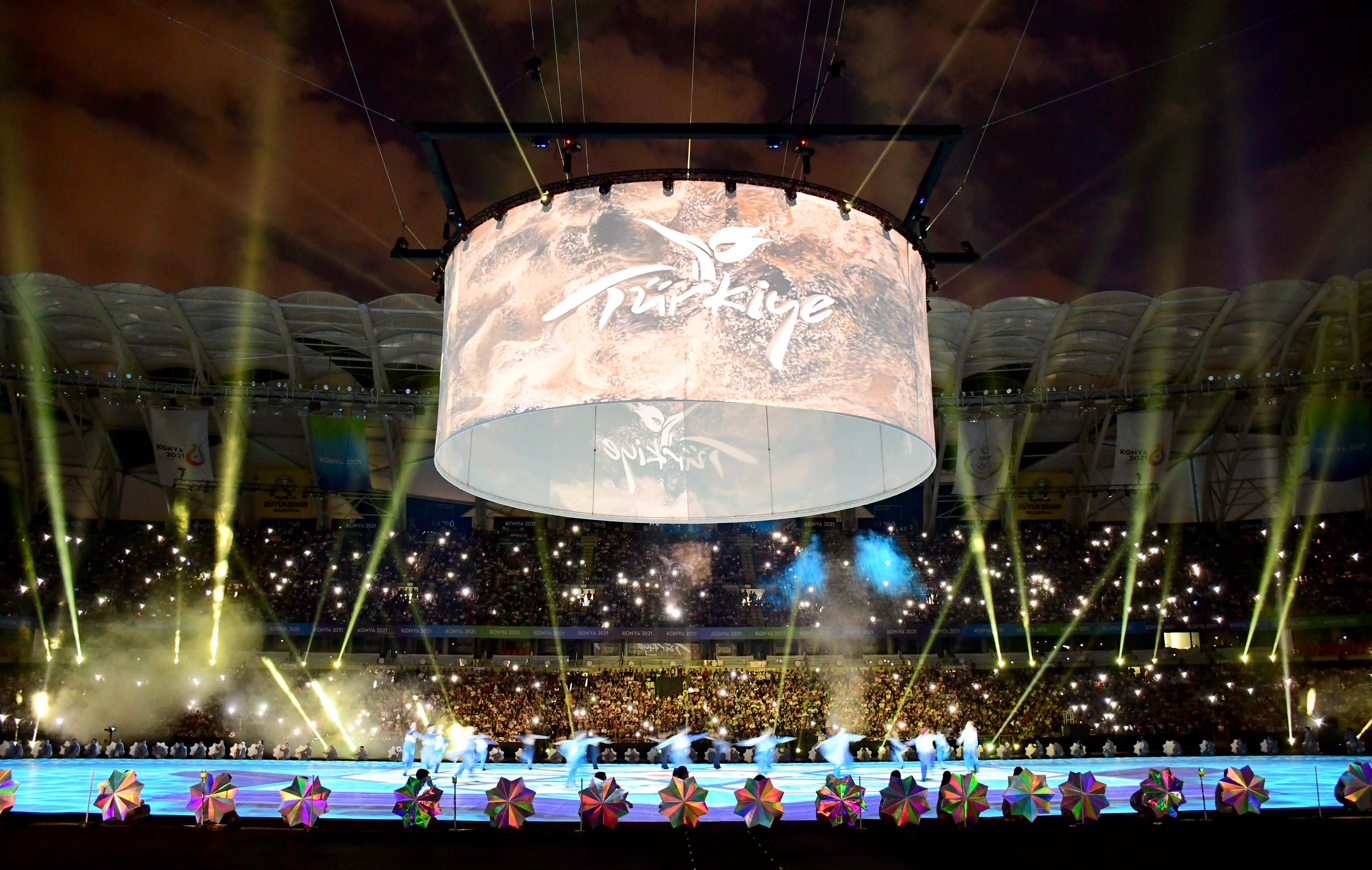
- Opening ceremony of the 2021 Islamic Solidarity Games in Konya, Turkey
- Purpose: Multi-sport event for member countries of the Organisation of Islamic Cooperation
- Frequency: Every four years
- Inaugurated: 2005 Islamic Solidarity Games in Mecca, Saudi Arabia
- Most recent: 2025 Islamic Solidarity Games in Riyadh, Saudi Arabia
- Next event: 2029 Islamic Solidarity Games in Sarawak, Malaysia
- Organization: Islamic Solidarity Sports Association
- Headquarters: Riyadh, Saudi Arabia
- Website: issf.sa

The Islamic Solidarity Games (Arabic: ألعاب التضامن الإسلامي, romanized: Alʿāb at-Taḍāmun al-Islāmī) is a multinational, multi-sport event that has been held since 2005. Managed jointly by the Organisation of Islamic Cooperation (OIC) and Islamic Solidarity Sports Association (ISSA), the Games involve elite athletes from the OIC members competing in a variety of sports. The most recent edition (2025) took place in Riyadh, Saudi Arabia.

== Background ==
The Solidarity Games were established to strengthen Islamic camaraderie and reinforce the values of Islam, primarily to the youth. The ISSF strives to improve Islamic solidarity, promote Islamic identity in sports and help reduce discrimination toward Muslims.

There are currently 57 members of the OIC. Non-Muslim citizens from member countries are also allowed to take part in the Games. With the level of political fragmentation, the deficiencies in economic development in many Muslim countries, and the financial cost of the Islamic Solidarity games, the longevity of the games is an on-going challenge.

== History ==
The idea for the Solidarity Games came from Prince Faisal bin Fahd bin Abdulaziz of Saudi Arabia, during the Third Islamic Summit in Mecca in 1981, one year after a similar event called the Islamic Games had been held in Turkey. The first Solidarity Games were held in Saudi Arabia in 2005. In that edition, the games were male-only with 7,000 athletes from fifty-four countries competing in thirteen sports.

The second Games were originally scheduled to take place in October 2009 in Iran, later rescheduled for April 2010, and ultimately canceled after a dispute arose between Iran and the Arab world over the use of the term "Persian Gulf" in logos for the Games, as some countries in the Arab world use the term "Arabian Gulf" instead. Dispute over the name has been a recurring source of disharmony between Arab states and Iran.

The 3rd Islamic Solidarity Games was held in Palembang, Indonesia in 2013 and the fourth edition took place in Baku on 12–22 May 2017.

The 2021 Islamic Solidarity Games were the fifth edition of the event. It was the first time that the event was organised by the Turkish Olympic Committee. Scheduled to take place in 2021, the event was postponed and held in 2022 in Konya, Turkey due to the COVID-19 pandemic.

The sixth games took place in Riyadh, Saudi Arabia, the first to be held in a country for the second time.

== Editions ==
Islamic Solidarity Games hosts

Edition	Year	Host city	Host country	Games dates / Opened by (Note: Names & offices in italics reflect an opener who was not head of state when opening the Games. If the office is partially italicized, the non-italicized portion is the office & name of the head of state being represented.)	Countries	Competitors	Sports	Events	Top-ranked team
I	2005	(Saudi Arabia) Mecca, Medina, Jeddah and Taif	Saudi Arabia	8–20 April 2005; Governor Abdul Majeed bin Abdulaziz Al Saud	55	7,000	15	108	Saudi Arabia
II	~~2009~~	(Iran) Tehran, Isfahan and Mashhad	Iran	Canceled (Note: Originally scheduled for 2009, and later re-scheduled for 2010, was cancelled after a dispute arose between Iran and the Arab countries.)					
III	2013	(Indonesia) Palembang	Indonesia	22 September – 1 October 2013; President Susilo Bambang Yudhoyono	57	1,769	13	183	Indonesia
IV	2017	(Azerbaijan) Baku	Azerbaijan	12–22 May 2017; President Ilham Aliyev	54	6,000	21	268	Azerbaijan
V	2021	(Turkey) Konya	Turkey	9–18 August 2022 (Note: Originally scheduled for 2021, the Games were postponed by one year due to the COVID-19 pandemic. However, the event was still referred to as the 2021 Islamic Solidarity Games to preserve the 4-year cycle.); President Recep Tayyip Erdoğan	55	4,200	19	380	Turkey
VI	2025	(Saudi Arabia) Riyadh (Note: In April 2021, it was announced that the 2025 games would take place in Cameroon. However, in May 2024, the ISSF announced that Riyadh would be the hosts of this edition.)	Saudi Arabia	7–21 November 2025; Governor Faisal bin Bandar Al Saud	57	3,065	21	270	Turkey
VII	2029	(Malaysia) Sarawak	Malaysia	Future event					

== Sports ==
35 sports have been presented in the Islamic Solidarity Games.

=== Current sports (2025) ===
- Athletics (since 2005) – at the Islamic Solidarity Games
- 3x3 Basketball (since 2005) – at the Islamic Solidarity Games
- Boxing (2017, 2025) – at the Islamic Solidarity Games
- Equestrian (2005–2013) – at the Islamic Solidarity Games
- Fencing (2005, 2013, 2021, 2025) – at the Islamic Solidarity Games
- Futsal (2005, 2025) – at the Islamic Solidarity Games
- Handball (since 2005) – at the Islamic Solidarity Games
- Judo (since 2017) – at the Islamic Solidarity Games
- Karate (since 2005) – at the Islamic Solidarity Games
- Swimming (since 2005) – at the Islamic Solidarity Games
- Taekwondo (since 2005) – at the Islamic Solidarity Games
- Table tennis (since 2005) – at the Islamic Solidarity Games
- Volleyball (since 2005) – at the Islamic Solidarity Games
- Weightlifting (since 2005) – at the Islamic Solidarity Games
- Wrestling (since 2017) – at the Islamic Solidarity Games
- Wushu (since 2013) – at the Islamic Solidarity Games

=== New sports ===
- Camel Racing (2025)
- Duathlon (2025)
- Esports (2025)
- Ju-Jitsu (2025)
- Muay Thai (2025)
- Para Athletics (2025)
- Para Powerlifting (2025)

=== Previous sports ===
- Archery (2013)
- Badminton (2013)
- Bodybuilding (2025)
- Diving (since 2005)
- Football (since 2005)
- Goalball (2005)
- Gymnastics (since 2017)
- Rhythmic gymnastics (2017)
- Shooting (2017)
- Tennis (since 2005)
- Water polo (since 2005)
- Zurkhaneh (2017)

== Medal count ==
All-time Islamic Solidarity Games medal table (as of 2025)
Rank	team	Gold	Silver	Bronze	Total
1	Turkey (TUR)	311	250	239	800
2	Iran (IRI)	147	115	139	401
3	Azerbaijan (AZE)	123	118	118	359
4	Uzbekistan (UZB)	95	94	128	317
5	Egypt (EGY)	63	62	65	190
6	Indonesia (INA)	60	90	97	247
7	Kazakhstan (KAZ)	57	56	78	191
8	Saudi Arabia (KSA)	55	45	68	168
9	Morocco (MAR)	50	46	76	172
10	Bahrain (BHR)	39	24	22	85
11	Malaysia (MAS)	33	23	44	100
12	Algeria (ALG)	27	48	86	161
13	Kyrgyzstan (KGZ)	18	19	38	75
14	Iraq (IRQ)	14	24	19	57
15	Nigeria (NGR)	14	18	9	41
16	Qatar (QAT)	11	11	19	41
17	Jordan (JOR)	11	9	32	52
18	Kuwait (KUW)	9	21	11	41
19	United Arab Emirates (UAE)	9	13	28	50
20	Tunisia (TUN)	8	8	39	55
21	Turkmenistan (TKM)	7	11	28	46
22	Syria (SYR)	7	6	15	28
23	Oman (OMN)	6	9	16	31
24	Cameroon (CMR)	5	11	18	34
25	Uganda (UGA)	5	10	9	24
26	Pakistan (PAK)	5	4	14	23
27	Senegal (SEN)	3	6	17	26
28	Gambia (GAM)	3	1	1	5
29	Djibouti (DJI)	2	4	5	11
30	Libya (LBA)	2	1	6	9
31	Tajikistan (TJK)	1	7	13	21
32	Sudan (SUD)	1	5	3	9
33	Bangladesh (BAN)	1	4	8	13
34	Burkina Faso (BUR)	1	3	2	6
35	Ivory Coast (CIV)	1	1	11	13
36	Afghanistan (AFG)	1	1	8	10
37	Niger (NIG)	1	1	2	4
38	Benin (BEN)	1	0	2	3
38	Guinea-Bissau (GBS)	1	0	2	3
40	Mozambique (MOZ)	1	0	1	2
41	Palestine (PLE)	0	4	5	9
42	Guyana (GUY)	0	3	5	8
43	Albania (ALB)	0	3	0	3
44	Guinea (GUI)	0	2	0	2
44	Mali (MLI)	0	2	0	2
46	Lebanon (LBN)	0	1	9	10
47	Yemen (YEM)	0	1	8	9
48	Suriname (SUR)	0	1	2	3
48	Togo (TOG)	0	1	2	3
50	Brunei (BRU)	0	1	0	1
51	Maldives (MDV)	0	0	2	2
51	Sierra Leone (SLE)	0	0	2	2
Totals (52 entries)		1,209	1,198	1,571	3,978

== See also ==
- Islamic Games
- Women's Islamic Games
