= 2010 Islamic Solidarity Games =

Cancelled multi-sport event

2nd Islamic Solidarity Games
- Host city: Tehran, Esfahan, Mashhad,
- Country: Iran
- Events: 193 in 14 sports
- Opening: 9 April 2010 (cancelled)
- Closing: 25 April 2010 (cancelled)
- Main venue: Takhti Stadium

The 2nd Islamic Solidarity Games (Persian: بازی‌های همبستگی اسلامی ۲۰۱۰) were going to be an international sporting event scheduled to be held in Iran from 16–30 October 2009. The Games were later postponed to 9–25 April 2010, and eventually cancelled following a dispute between the host country and Saudi Arabia, over how the body of water located between Iran and the Arabian Peninsula was to be called.

== Suspension and cancellation of the Games ==
It was reported 3 May 2009 that Iran had suspended the games due to a dispute over the use of the term "Persian Gulf". Saudi Arabia and other Arab countries disapproved of the use of the term "Persian Gulf" on literature and medals and insisted the term "Arabian Gulf" or just "Gulf" be used instead. Iran claimed it was still in talks to try to salvage the games.

On 17 January 2010, the governing body of the ISG reported that the event had been cancelled due to the tension between Arab states and Iran over the name of the body of water.

== Venues ==
City	Venue	Sports	Capacity
Tehran	Takhti Stadium	Opening ceremony Closing ceremony Football	TBA
Tehran	Azadi Sport Complex	Swimming Diving Basketball Shooting Volleyball Weightlifting Football	TBA
Tehran	Aftab Enghelab Complex	Athletics	TBA
Tehran	Shiroudi Sport Complex	Water polo, Table tennis (Men)	TBA
Tehran	Tehran Taekwondo Home	Table tennis (Women)	TBA
Tehran	Tehran Handball Hall	Sitting volleyball	TBA
Tehran	Hejab Hall	Futsal (Disabled)	TBA
Tehran	Tehran Janbazan Complex	Table tennis (Disabled)	TBA
Esfahan	Nilforoushan Hall	Fencing	TBA
Esfahan	Pirouzi Hall	Handball	TBA
Esfahan	17 Shahrivar Hall	Karate	TBA
Esfahan	Mellat Hall	Taekwondo	TBA
Mashhad	Samen Stadium	Football	TBA
Mashhad	Kowsar Hall	Judo	TBA
Mashhad	Beheshti Hall	Wrestling	TBA
Mashhad	Astan Qods Razavi Hall	Zurkhaneh	TBA

== Sports ==
2025 Islamic Solidarity Games sports programme (medal events)

- Aquatics
- Athletics
- Basketball
- Fencing
- Football
- Handball
- Judo
- Karate
- Shooting
- Table tennis
- Taekwondo
- Volleyball
- Weightlifting
- Wrestling

2025 Islamic Solidarity Games sports programme (demonstration events)

- Zurkhaneh
- Disabled sports
- Futsal
- Shooting
- Sitting volleyball
- Table tennis
