= 2017 Islamic Solidarity Games =

Multi-sport competition held in Baku, Azerbaijan

Islamic Solidarity Games
- Host city: Baku
- Country: Azerbaijan
- Motto: Gücümüz həmrəylikdədir (Solidarity is our strength!)
- Nations: 54
- Athletes: 6000
- Opening: 12 May 2017
- Closing: 22 May 2017
- Opened by: Ilham Aliyev; President of Azerbaijan
- Main venue: Baku Olympic Stadium
- Website: http://www.baku2017.com

The 4th Islamic Solidarity Games (Azerbaijani: 2017 IV İslam Həmrəyliyi Oyunları) was a multinational, multi-sport event that was held in Baku, Azerbaijan, from May 12 to 22, 2017. Previously, the event was held in Saudi Arabia in 2005 and Indonesia in 2013. The second event, originally scheduled to take place in October 2009 in Iran, was later rescheduled but then cancelled.

The Islamic Solidarity Sports Federation (ISSF) is responsible for the direction and control of the Islamic Solidarity Games.

== Bidding ==
In October 2012, the National Olympic Committee of Azerbaijan submitted its bid for the 2017 Islamic Solidarity Games during the 18th Islamic Solidarity Sports Federation meeting held in Jeddah, Saudi Arabia. Baku was awarded the event during the General Assembly of ISSF in 2013, which was also held in Jeddah.

== Participating nations ==
All 56 members of the Islamic Solidarity Sports Federation participated in the games. Due to the suspension of the Kuwait Olympic Committee, athletes from Kuwait participated in the Games as independent ISSF athletes under the flag of the Islamic Solidarity Sports Federation. Athletes and coaches were accredited by the ISSF; they wore ISSF uniforms, and any medals they might have won would have been received under the ISSF banner and anthem. Along with the Kuwaiti athletes, athletes from Libya and Sudan were scheduled to compete under the ISSF banner but withdrew hours before the opening ceremony.

Below is a list of all the participating NOCs; the number of competitors per delegation is indicated in brackets.

Participating National Committees
- Afghanistan (49)
- Albania (10)
- Algeria (118)
- Azerbaijan (425) host
- Bahrain (15)
- Bangladesh (30)
- Benin (21)
- Brunei (6)
- Burkina Faso (6)
- Cameroon (80)
- Chad (9)
- Comoros (9)
- Djibouti (8)
- Egypt (46)
- Gabon (7)
- Gambia (14)
- Guinea (7)
- Guinea-Bissau (9)
- Guyana (16)
- Indonesia (127)
- Iran (100)
- Iraq (49)
- Ivory Coast (57)
- Jordan (39)
- Kazakhstan (23)
- Kyrgyzstan (48)
- Lebanon (5)
- Libya withdrew
- Malaysia (42)
- Maldives (28)
- Mali (6)
- Mauritania (6)
- Morocco (100)
- Mozambique (17)
- Niger (9)
- Nigeria (18)
- Oman (30)
- Pakistan (125)
- Palestine (65)
- Qatar (35)
- Saudi Arabia (188)
- Senegal (25)
- Sierra Leone (10)
- Somalia (7)
- Sudan (-)
- Suriname (11)
- Syria (33)
- Tajikistan (40)
- Togo (14)
- Tunisia (25)
- Turkey (350)
- Turkmenistan (160)
- Uganda (24)
- United Arab Emirates (40)
- Uzbekistan (121)
- Yemen (15)

== Venues ==
There were 17 competition venues used during the Games. The main stadium, known as Baku Olympic Stadium, has an all-seater capacity of 69,870 seats.

Venue Name	Sports	Capacity
AZAL Arena	Football	1,370
Azerbaijan Weightlifting Academy	Weightlifting	250
Baku Aquatics Centre	Diving, Swimming	3,000
Baku Basketball Arena	Basketball 3×3	1,500
Baku Crystal Hall 1	Volleyball	2,200
Baku Crystal Hall 2	Boxing, Zurkhaneh	1,088
Baku National Stadium	Athletics, Para Athletics, Ceremonies	65,000
Baku Shooting Centre	Shooting	550
Baku Sports Hall	Karate, Taekwondo, Wushu	1,050
Baku Tennis Academy	Tennis	1,250
Baku Water Polo Arena	Water Polo	650
Bayil Stadium	Football	1,200
Dalga Arena	Football	2,750
Heydar Aliyev Arena	Judo, Blind Judo, Freestyle Wrestling, Greco-Roman Wrestling	5,000
National Gymnastics Arena	Artistic Gymnastics, Rhythmic Gymnastics	2,471
Sarhadchi Arena	Handball, Table Tennis	1,000
Tofiq Bahramov Republican Stadium	Football	22,400

== Volunteers ==
Registration for Volunteers Program of Baku 2017 4th Islamic Solidarity Games was available between October 17 and December 11, 2016. Within this period the Volunteers Program had 12500 registered applicants. All the registered applicants were invited for the interview at the Volunteers Centre at Azerbaijan State Academy of Physical Education and Sports from November 7, 2016, to February 16, 2017.

The main goal of the program is to ensure Baku 2017 volunteers development, enable them to have a successful career in future, and support in achieving their long-term life goals.

== Sports ==
24 disciplines from 21 sports were contested in this edition of Islamic Solidarity Games. Some sports also included disabled sport events such as athletics and judo.

- Aquatics
  - Diving (6)
  - Swimming (40)
  - Water polo (1)
- Athletics (54)
- Basketball (2)
- Boxing (10)
- Football (1)
- Gymnastics
  - Artistic gymnastics (12)
  - Rhythmic gymnastics (5)
- Handball (2)
- Judo (22)
- Karate (12)
- Shooting (19)
- Table tennis (4)
- Taekwondo (16)
- Tennis (6)
- Volleyball (2)
- Weightlifting (16)
- Wrestling (24)
- Wushu (7)
- Zurkhaneh sports (7)

== Medal table ==
* Host nation (Azerbaijan)

Rank	Nation	Gold	Silver	Bronze	Total
1	Azerbaijan (AZE)*	75	50	37	162
2	Turkey (TUR)	71	67	57	195
3	Iran (IRI)	39	26	33	98
4	Uzbekistan (UZB)	15	17	31	63
5	Bahrain (BHR)	12	5	4	21
6	Algeria (ALG)	7	12	21	40
7	Morocco (MAR)	7	5	15	27
8	Indonesia (INA)	6	29	23	58
9	Egypt (EGY)	6	5	7	18
10	Kyrgyzstan (KGZ)	4	5	8	17
11	Saudi Arabia (KSA)	4	1	6	11
12	Jordan (JOR)	3	1	12	16
13	Iraq (IRQ)	2	7	5	14
14	Kazakhstan (KAZ)	2	5	12	19
15	Turkmenistan (TKM)	2	4	7	13
16	Qatar (QAT)	2	3	7	12
17	Nigeria (NGR)	2	3	1	6
18	Syria (SYR)	2	2	6	10
19	Tunisia (TUN)	1	3	8	12
20	Cameroon (CMR)	1	2	6	9
21	Bangladesh (BAN)	1	1	1	3
21	Senegal (SEN)	1	1	1	3
23	Gambia (GAM)	1	1	0	2
24	Benin (BEN)	1	0	1	2
24	Guinea-Bissau (GBS)	1	0	1	2
24	Mozambique (MOZ)	1	0	1	2
27	Pakistan (PAK)	0	3	9	12
28	Oman (OMA)	0	3	4	7
29	United Arab Emirates (UAE)	0	1	3	4
30	Guyana (GUY)	0	1	2	3
30	Suriname (SUR)	0	1	2	3
32	Djibouti (DJI)	0	1	1	2
33	Mali (MLI)	0	1	0	1
33	Uganda (UGA)	0	1	0	1
35	Afghanistan (AFG)	0	0	6	6
36	Ivory Coast (CIV)	0	0	4	4
36	Tajikistan (TJK)	0	0	4	4
38	Malaysia (MAS)	0	0	2	2
38	Yemen (YEM)	0	0	2	2
40	Lebanon (LBN)	0	0	1	1
Totals (40 entries)		269	267	351	887

== Marketing ==
=== Sponsors ===
Partners

- AZAL: Last March, Azerbaijan airlines signed a partnership with Baku 2017 Islamic Solidarity Games.
- BonAqua: Bon aqua is a brand of The Coca-Cola Company made in Azerbaijani. They officially announced their partnership with the Islamic games.
- SOCAR: On 11 April, SOCAR signed their partnership. The company committed to have a long-term partnership with the committee of the Islamic games.
- BP: On 6 February, The organizing committee signed an agreement with BP a major oil and gas company in Azerbaijan.
- MICROPLUS: Italian company committed for the Data Processing and Timing of the Baku 2017 games

Supporters

- AZ Holding Group: Milla and AZ (Azerbaijan Food and Packaging Company): The Azerbaijani company Milla is the first supporter to prolong their collaboration with the organizing committee of the Islamic games.
- Nestlé: Nestlé Azerbaijan will also be an official supplier of the 4th Islamic solidarity games.
- Iticket AZ: Iticket.az is the official ticketing supporter of the Baku 2017 games.

=== Official mascots ===
The Azerbaijani Karabakh horses named were announced as mascots on February 13, 2017. Inje is the name of the female version and the name Jasur was selected for the male version.

== Broadcasters ==
The following channels broadcast the Games:

- Afghanistan — RTA
- Albania — RTSH
- Azerbaijan — AzTV and Idman TV
- Bangladesh — BTV
- Benin — ORTB
- Brunei — RTB
- Burkina Faso — RTB
- Cameroon — CRTV
- Chad — ONRTV
- Democratic Republic of the Congo — RTNC
- Egypt — ERTU
- Gabon — Gabon TV
- Gambia — GRTS
- Guinea — RTG Conarky
- Guinea-Bissau — Guinea Bisau TV
- Guyana — NCNTV11
- Indonesia — TVRI, RCTI And Global TV (Indonesia)
- Iran — IRIB Varzesh
- Ivory Coast — RTI
- Kenya — KBC
- Malaysia — RTM
- Maldives — PSM
- Mali — ORTM
- Mauritius — MBC
- Mozambique — TVM
- Niger — ORTN
- Nigeria — NTA
- Pakistan — PTV
- Qatar — Al-Kass
- Saudi Arabia — SBC
- Senegal — RTS
- Sierra Leone — SLBC
- Suriname — ATV
- Tanzania — AZAMTV
- Togo — TVT
- Turkey — TRT Avaz and TRT Spor.
- Uganda — UBC
