= 2005 Islamic Solidarity Games =

Multi-sport competition held in Saudi Arabia

1st Islamic Solidarity Games
- Host city: Mecca, Medina, Jeddah, Ta’if
- Country: Saudi Arabia
- Nations: 55
- Athletes: 6000
- Events: 107 in 15 sports
- Opening: 8 April 2005
- Closing: 20 April 2005
- Opened by: Governor of Makkah Region, Abdul Majeed bin Abdulaziz Al Saud
- Main venue: King Abdul Aziz Stadium
- Website: fisgr.com

The 1st Islamic Solidarity Games held in the Islamic holy city of Mecca in Saudi Arabia from 8–20 April 2005 with an Olympic-style tournament aimed at showing Muslim sports prowess and featuring 6,000 athletes. Only men's events were included on the programme.

Fifty five nations participated in the said "Islamic Olympic Games", hosted by the Saudi cities of Mecca, Medina, Jeddah and Ta’if.

Prince Abdul Majeed bin Abdulaziz Al Saud, the prince of Mecca, opened the games in a ceremony in which more than 2,600 students participated at King Abdul Aziz Stadium.

== Sports ==
2005 Islamic Solidarity Games sports programme (medal events)

- Aquatic sports
  - Swimming (19)
  - Diving (2)
  - Water polo (1)
- Athletics (23)
- Basketball (1)
- Equestrian (4)
- Fencing (6)
- Football (1)
- Handball (1)
- Karate (11)
- Table tennis (3)
- Taekwondo (8)
- Tennis (3)
- Volleyball (1)
- Weightlifting (24)
- Paralympic sports
  - Intellectually Disabled Futsal (1)
  - Goalball (1)

== Medal table ==
* Host nation (Saudi Arabia)

Source
Rank	Nation	Gold	Silver	Bronze	Total
1	Saudi Arabia (KSA)*	24	17	19	60
2	Egypt (EGY)	14	15	13	42
3	Kazakhstan (KAZ)	13	8	6	27
4	Iran (IRI)	10	9	11	30
5	Iraq (IRQ)	9	9	7	25
6	Morocco (MAR)	8	6	4	18
7	Malaysia (MAS)	5	5	6	16
8	Azerbaijan (AZE)	4	4	7	15
9	Algeria (ALG)	3	10	13	26
10	Syria (SYR)	3	2	5	10
11	Pakistan (PAK)	3	0	1	4
12	Kyrgyzstan (KGZ)	2	2	4	8
13	Jordan (JOR)	2	0	3	5
14	Kuwait (KUW)	1	4	5	10
15	Turkey (TUR)	1	3	3	7
16	Sudan (SUD)	1	3	2	6
17	Turkmenistan (TKM)	1	1	4	6
18	Indonesia (INA)	1	1	2	4
19	Tajikistan (TJK)	1	1	0	2
20	Tunisia (TUN)	1	0	8	9
21	Qatar (QAT)	1	0	0	1
22	Senegal (SEN)	0	2	6	8
23	United Arab Emirates (UAE)	0	2	3	5
24	Burkina Faso (BUR)	0	1	1	2
24	Yemen (YEM)	0	1	1	2
26	Cameroon (CMR)	0	1	0	1
26	Oman (OMA)	0	1	0	1
28	Afghanistan (AFG)	0	0	1	1
28	Guyana (GUY)	0	0	1	1
28	Ivory Coast (CIV)	0	0	1	1
28	Libya (LBA)	0	0	1	1
28	Uganda (UGA)	0	0	1	1
Totals (32 entries)		108	108	139	355
