= 2023 Kaba Uulu Kozhomkul & Raatbek Sanatbaev Tournament =

Wrestling competition

- Host city: Bishkek, Kyrgyzstan
- Dates: 1-4 June 2023
- Stadium: Bishkek Arena

Champions
- Freestyle: Georgia
- Greco-Roman: Iran
- Women: Ukraine

The 2023 Kaba Uulu Kozhomkul & Raatbek Sanatbaev Tournament, is a wrestling event held in Bishkek, Kyrgyzstan between 1 and 4 June 2023. It will held as the third of the ranking series of United World Wrestling in 2023. With an aim to reward wrestlers participating in Ranking Series tournaments, the United World Wrestling will award prize money to the medal winners in all weight classes with a total prize money of 390,000 Swiss Francs. The gold medal winners at the four Ranking Series tournaments in 2023 will receive 1500 Swiss Francs with the silver medallists getting 750 Swiss Francs. The two bronze medallists will receive 500 Swiss Francs each.

== Ranking Series ==
Ranking Series Calendar 2023 of United World Wrestling:

- 1st Ranking Series: 1-5 February, Croatia, Zagreb ⇒ 2023 Grand Prix Zagreb Open
- 2nd Ranking Series: 23-26 February, Egypt, Alexandria ⇒ 2023 Ibrahim Moustafa Tournament
- 3rd Ranking Series: 1-4 June, Kyrgyzstan, Bishkek ⇒ 2023 Kaba Uulu Kozhomkul & Raatbek Sanatbaev Tournament
- 4th Ranking Series: 13-16 July, Hungary, Budapest ⇒ 2023 Polyák Imre & Varga János Memorial Tournament

== Competition schedule ==
All times are (UTC+6)

Date	Time	Event
1 June Thursday	10.30-14.30	Qualification rounds & repechage GR 55-60-63-67-87-97-130 kg
1 June Thursday	18.00-20.30	Final matches and awarding ceremony: GR 55-60-63-67-87-97-130 kg
2 June Friday	10.30-14.30	Qualification rounds & repechage GR 72-77-82 kg & WW 57-62-68-76 kg
2 June Friday	18.00-20.30	Final matches and awarding ceremony: Finals GR 72-77-82 kg & WW 57-62-68-76 kg
3 June Saturday	10.30-14.30	Qualification rounds & repechage WW 50-53-55-59-65-72 kg & FS 97-125 kg
3 June Saturday	18.00-20.30	Final matches and awarding ceremony: Finals WW 50-53-55-59-65-72 kg & FS 97-125 kg
4 June Sunday	10.30-14.30	Qualification rounds & repechage FS 57-61-65-70-74-79-86-92 kg
4 June Sunday	18.00-20.30	Final matches and awarding ceremony: Finals FS 57-61-65-70-74-79-86-92 kg

== Medal table ==
* Host nation (Kyrgyzstan)

Rank	Nation	Gold	Silver	Bronze	Total
1	Georgia	5	3	3	11
2	Iran	5	1	2	8
3	Kyrgyzstan*	4	2	8	14
4	Kazakhstan	3	3	7	13
5	Ukraine	3	2	2	7
6	China	2	5	10	17
7	Mongolia	2	4	2	8
8	Uzbekistan	2	3	4	9
9	Bahrain	2	1	0	3
10	Azerbaijan	1	2	2	5
11	India	1	1	2	4
12	Turkey	0	1	7	8
13	Cuba	0	1	1	2
14	Canada	0	1	0	1
15	Ecuador	0	0	2	2
15	Tajikistan	0	0	2	2
17	Czech Republic	0	0	1	1
17	Italy	0	0	1	1
Totals (18 entries)		30	30	56	116

== Team ranking ==
Rank	Men's freestyle		Men's Greco-Roman		Women's freestyle	
Rank	Team	Points	Team	Points	Team	Points
1	Georgia	135	Iran	175	Ukraine	143
2	Kyrgyzstan	122	Uzbekistan	148	China	115
3	Kazakhstan	116	Georgia	139	Kazakhstan	110
4	Uzbekistan	86	Kazakhstan	123	India	86
5	China	79	China	83	Mongolia	77
6	Bahrain	76	Kyrgyzstan	79	Turkey	50
7	Mongolia	61	Turkey	71	Canada	46
8	Turkey	60	India	37	Kyrgyzstan	40
9	Azerbaijan	51	Cuba	35	Ecuador	38
10	India	32	Czech Republic	15	Uzbekistan	26

== Medal overview ==
=== Men's freestyle ===
Event	Gold	Silver	Bronze
57 kg	Almaz Smanbekov; Kyrgyzstan	Bekzat Almaz Uulu; Kyrgyzstan	Meirambek Kartbay; Kazakhstan
57 kg	Almaz Smanbekov; Kyrgyzstan	Bekzat Almaz Uulu; Kyrgyzstan	Zou Wanhao; China
61 kg	Taiyrbek Zhumashbek Uulu; Kyrgyzstan	Shota Phartenadze; Georgia	Emrah Ormanoğlu; Turkey
61 kg	Taiyrbek Zhumashbek Uulu; Kyrgyzstan	Shota Phartenadze; Georgia	Abdymalik Karachov; Kyrgyzstan
65 kg	Tömör-Ochiryn Tulga; Mongolia	Alibek Osmonov; Kyrgyzstan	Abdulmazhid Kudiev; Tajikistan
65 kg	Tömör-Ochiryn Tulga; Mongolia	Alibek Osmonov; Kyrgyzstan	Ikromzhon Khadzhimurodov; Kyrgyzstan
70 kg	Orozobek Toktomambetov; Kyrgyzstan	Syrbaz Talgat; Kazakhstan	Servet Coşkun; Turkey
70 kg	Orozobek Toktomambetov; Kyrgyzstan	Syrbaz Talgat; Kazakhstan	Ernazar Akmataliev; Kyrgyzstan
74 kg	Turan Bayramov; Azerbaijan	Dzhabrail Gadzhiev; Azerbaijan	Khadzhimurad Gadzhiyev; Azerbaijan
74 kg	Turan Bayramov; Azerbaijan	Dzhabrail Gadzhiev; Azerbaijan	Magomet Evloev; Tajikistan
79 kg	Vladimeri Gamkrelidze; Georgia	Khidir Saipudinov; Bahrain	Zhiger Zakirov; Kazakhstan
79 kg	Vladimeri Gamkrelidze; Georgia	Khidir Saipudinov; Bahrain	Adilet Maratbaev; Kyrgyzstan
86 kg	Magomed Sharipov; Bahrain	Abubakr Abakarov; Azerbaijan	Javrail Shapiev; Uzbekistan
86 kg	Magomed Sharipov; Bahrain	Abubakr Abakarov; Azerbaijan	Azamat Dauletbekov; Kazakhstan
92 kg	Miriani Maisuradze; Georgia	Ganbaataryn Gankhuyag; Mongolia	Andro Margishvili; Georgia
92 kg	Miriani Maisuradze; Georgia	Ganbaataryn Gankhuyag; Mongolia	Aergen Jumabayi; China
97 kg	Akhmed Tazhudinov; Bahrain	Habila Awusayiman; China	Nursultan Azov; Kazakhstan
97 kg	Akhmed Tazhudinov; Bahrain	Habila Awusayiman; China	Magomed Ibragimov; Uzbekistan
125 kg	Geno Petriashvili; Georgia	Sardorbek Kholmatov; Uzbekistan	Buheeerdun; China
125 kg	Geno Petriashvili; Georgia	Sardorbek Kholmatov; Uzbekistan	Deng Zhiwei; China

=== Men's Greco-Roman ===
Event	Gold	Silver	Bronze
55 kg	Marlan Mukashev; Kazakhstan	Marlan Mukashev; Uzbekistan	Amangali Bekbolatov; Kazakhstan
55 kg	Marlan Mukashev; Kazakhstan	Marlan Mukashev; Uzbekistan	Manjeet Chahar; India
60 kg	Islomjon Bakhromov; Uzbekistan	Nursultan Bazarbayev; Kazakhstan	Yernar Fidakhmetov; Kazakhstan
60 kg	Islomjon Bakhromov; Uzbekistan	Nursultan Bazarbayev; Kazakhstan	Mehdi Mohsennejad; Iran
63 kg	Leri Abuladze; Georgia	Shermukhammad Sharibjanov; Uzbekistan	Iman Mohammadi; Iran
63 kg	Leri Abuladze; Georgia	Shermukhammad Sharibjanov; Uzbekistan	Dastan Kadyrov; Kyrgyzstan
67 kg	Danial Sohrabi; Iran	Husiyuetu; China	Luis Orta; Cuba
67 kg	Danial Sohrabi; Iran	Husiyuetu; China	Abror Atabaev; Uzbekistan
72 kg	Ramaz Zoidze; Georgia	Mohammad Reza Geraei; Iran	Otar Abuladze; Georgia
72 kg	Ramaz Zoidze; Georgia	Mohammad Reza Geraei; Iran	Abdullo Aliev; Uzbekistan
77 kg	Mohammad Ali Geraei; Iran	Iuri Lomadze; Georgia	Liu Rui; China
77 kg	Mohammad Ali Geraei; Iran	Iuri Lomadze; Georgia	Yüksel Sarıçiçek; Turkey
82 kg	Alireza Mohmadi; Iran	Alperen Berber; Turkey	Gela Bolkvadze; Georgia
82 kg	Alireza Mohmadi; Iran	Alperen Berber; Turkey	Beksultan Nazarbaev; Kyrgyzstan
87 kg	Jalgasbay Berdimuratov; Uzbekistan	Gurami Khetsuriani; Georgia	Ali Cengiz; Turkey
87 kg	Jalgasbay Berdimuratov; Uzbekistan	Gurami Khetsuriani; Georgia	Nursultan Tursynov; Kazakhstan
97 kg	Mohammad Hadi Saravi; Iran	Yiming Li; China	Beksultan Makhmudov; Kyrgyzstan
97 kg	Mohammad Hadi Saravi; Iran	Yiming Li; China	Artur Omarov; Czech Republic
130 kg	Amin Mirzazadeh; Iran	Óscar Pino; Cuba	Osman Yıldırım; Turkey
130 kg	Amin Mirzazadeh; Iran	Óscar Pino; Cuba	Fatih Bozkurt; Turkey

=== Women's freestyle ===
Event	Gold	Silver	Bronze
50 kg	Fan Meng; China	Oksana Livach; Ukraine	Lei Chun; China
50 kg	Fan Meng; China	Oksana Livach; Ukraine	Feng Ziqi; China
53 kg	Batkhuyagiin Khulan; Mongolia	Ganbaataryn Otgonjargal; Mongolia	Lucía Yépez; Ecuador
53 kg	Batkhuyagiin Khulan; Mongolia	Ganbaataryn Otgonjargal; Mongolia	Bat-Ochiryn Bolortuyaa; Mongolia
55 kg	Marina Sedneva; Kazakhstan	Karla Godinez; Canada	Mariia Vynnyk; Ukraine
57 kg	Alina Hrushyna; Ukraine	Hong Kexin; China	Zhala Aliyeva; Azerbaijan
57 kg	Alina Hrushyna; Ukraine	Hong Kexin; China	Zhuomalaga; China
59 kg	Yuliya Tkach; Ukraine	Solomiia Vynnyk; Ukraine	Sarita Mor; India
62 kg	Ilona Prokopevniuk; Ukraine	Pürevdorjiin Orkhon; Mongolia	Sükheegiin Tserenchimed; Mongolia
62 kg	Ilona Prokopevniuk; Ukraine	Pürevdorjiin Orkhon; Mongolia	Long Jia; China
65 kg	Manisha Bhanwala; India	Irina Kazyulina; Kazakhstan	Yulia Leskovets; Ukraine
68 kg	Zhou Feng; China	Enkhsaikhany Delgermaa; Mongolia	Meerim Zhumanazarova; Kyrgyzstan
68 kg	Zhou Feng; China	Enkhsaikhany Delgermaa; Mongolia	Nesrin Baş; Turkey
72 kg	Zhamila Bakbergenova; Kazakhstan	Reetika Hooda; India	Dalma Caneva; Italy
76 kg	Aiperi Medet Kyzy; Kyrgyzstan	Huang Yuanyuan; China	Qiandegenchagan; China
76 kg	Aiperi Medet Kyzy; Kyrgyzstan	Huang Yuanyuan; China	Génesis Reasco; Ecuador

== Participating nations ==
363 wrestlers from 33 countries:

1. Argentina (2)
2. Austria (1)
3. Azerbaijan (7)
4. Brazil (1)
5. Bahrain (4)
6. Canada (5)
7. China (53)
8. Cuba (2)
9. Czech Republic (1)
10. Ecuador (3)
11. Egypt (2)
12. Spain (2)
13. Estonia (1)
14. France (1)
15. Germany (1)
16. Georgia (26)
17. Hungary (1)
18. India (28)
19. Iran (11)
20. Italy (1)
21. Jordan (2)
22. Kazakhstan (69)
23. Kyrgyzstan (46) (Host)
24. Mongolia (15)
25. Norway (2)
26. Palestine (1)
27. Poland (3)
28. Romania (3)
29. Tajikistan (2)
30. Turkmenistan (4)
31. Turkey (19)
32. Ukraine (12)
33. Uzbekistan (34)

== Results ==
Legend

- F — Won by fall
- R — Retired
- WO — Won by walkover

=== Men's freestyle ===
==== Men's freestyle 57 kg ====
Round of 16
Ahmet Duman (TUR)	2
Nodirjon Safarov (UZB)	7
Meirambek Kartbay (KAZ)	12
Rakhat Kalzhan (KAZ)	2
Zou Wanhao (CHN)	8
Bekbolot Myrzanazar Uulu (KGZ)	6
Beka Bujiashvili (GEO)	8
Zandanbudyn Zanabazar (MGL)	2

Quarterfinals
Bekzat Almaz Uulu (KGZ)	6^{F}
Nodirjon Safarov (UZB)	2
Meirambek Kartbay (KAZ)	11
Roberti Dingashvili (GEO)	0
Almaz Smanbekov (KGZ)	3
Zou Wanhao (CHN)	1
Beka Bujiashvili (GEO)	5
Abzal Okenov (KAZ)	0

Semifinals
Bekzat Almaz Uulu (KGZ)	8
Meirambek Kartbay (KAZ)	5
Almaz Smanbekov (KGZ)	4
Beka Bujiashvili (GEO)	2

Final
Bekzat Almaz Uulu (KGZ)	1
Almaz Smanbekov (KGZ)	6

Bronze medal match
Nodirjon Safarov (UZB)	6
Meirambek Kartbay (KAZ)	12
Zou Wanhao (CHN)	7
Beka Bujiashvili (GEO)	0

==== Men's freestyle 61 kg ====
Round of 16
Giorgi Goniashvili (GEO)	2
Pankaj Malik (IND)	8
Taiyrbek Zhumashbek Uulu (KGZ)	WO
Ravi Kumar Dahiya (IND)
Emrah Ormanoğlu (TUR)	2
Assyl Aitakyn (KAZ)	1
Nurbolat Abdualiyev (KAZ)	2
Abdymalik Karachov (KGZ)	4
Sardor Ruzimov (UZB)	7
Kairat Amirtayev (KAZ)	5

Quarterfinals
Aman Sehrawat (IND)	1
Pankaj Malik (IND)	8
Taiyrbek Zhumashbek Uulu (KGZ)	5
Emrah Ormanoğlu (TUR)	5
Ali Aburumaila (PLE)	0
Abdymalik Karachov (KGZ)	4
Sardor Ruzimov (UZB)	0
Shota Phartenadze (GEO)	11

Semifinals
Pankaj Malik (IND)	0
Taiyrbek Zhumashbek Uulu (KGZ)	7
Abdymalik Karachov (KGZ)	4
Shota Phartenadze (GEO)	5

Final
Taiyrbek Zhumashbek Uulu (KGZ)	8
Shota Phartenadze (GEO)	2

Repechage round 2
Ravi Kumar Dahiya (IND)
Emrah Ormanoğlu (TUR)	WO

Bronze medal match
Emrah Ormanoğlu (TUR)	6
Pankaj Malik (IND)	1
Sardor Ruzimov (UZB)	1
Abdymalik Karachov (KGZ)	6^{F}

==== Men's freestyle 65 kg ====
Round of 32
	Score	
Umidjon Jalolov (UZB)	8–2	Edemi Bolkvadze (GEO)

Round of 16
Tömör-Ochiryn Tulga (MGL)	4
Abdulmazhid Kudiev (TJK)	0
Umidjon Jalolov (UZB)	5
Hamza Alaca (TUR)	2
Abbos Rakhmonov (UZB)	3
Meirzhan Ashirov (KAZ)	5
Wei Baowen (CHN)	0
Galymzhan Ibadulla (KAZ)	5
Anuj Kumar (IND)	6
Ali Rahimzade (AZE)	7
Agustín Destribats (ARG)	10
Biekezhati Nuerlaxi (CHN)	0
Aden Sakybaev (KGZ)	7
Ikromzhon Khadzhimurodov (KGZ)	5^{F}
Rifat Saibotalov (KAZ)	2
Alibek Osmonov (KGZ)	5

Quarterfinals
Tömör-Ochiryn Tulga (MGL)	6
Umidjon Jalolov (UZB)	5
Meirzhan Ashirov (KAZ)	10
Galymzhan Ibadulla (KAZ)	1
Ali Rahimzade (AZE)	1
Agustín Destribats (ARG)	3
Ikromzhon Khadzhimurodov (KGZ)	1
Alibek Osmonov (KGZ)	4

Semifinals
Tömör-Ochiryn Tulga (MGL)	8
Meirzhan Ashirov (KAZ)	4
Agustín Destribats (ARG)	3
Alibek Osmonov (KGZ)	3

Final
Tömör-Ochiryn Tulga (MGL)	5
Alibek Osmonov (KGZ)	2

Repechage round 1
Abdulmazhid Kudiev (TJK)	9
Umidjon Jalolov (UZB)	5
Rifat Saibotalov (KAZ)	2
Ikromzhon Khadzhimurodov (KGZ)	5

Bronze medal match
Abdulmazhid Kudiev (TJK)	10
Meirzhan Ashirov (KAZ)	0
Ikromzhon Khadzhimurodov (KGZ)	8
Agustín Destribats (ARG)	2

==== Men's freestyle 70 kg ====
Round of 16
Servet Coşkun (TUR)	0
Orozobek Toktomambetov (KGZ)	5
Doszhan Assetov (KAZ)	4
Mulayam Yadav (IND)	9
Agudamu (CHN)	1
Davit Patsinashvili (GEO)	5
Ernazar Akmataliev (KGZ)	6
Zafarbek Otakhonov (UZB)	2
Wurenibai Nuerlanbieke (CHN)	5
Giorgi Elbakidze (GEO)	5

Quarterfinals
Orts Isakov (JOR)	0
Orozobek Toktomambetov (KGZ)	11
Mulayam Yadav (IND)	6
Davit Patsinashvili (GEO)	2
Yerkebulan Shynykul (KAZ)	0
Ernazar Akmataliev (KGZ)	11
Giorgi Elbakidze (GEO)	2
Syrbaz Talgat (KAZ)	12

Semifinals
Orozobek Toktomambetov (KGZ)	7
Mulayam Yadav (IND)	1
Ernazar Akmataliev (KGZ)	6
Syrbaz Talgat (KAZ)	11

Final
Orozobek Toktomambetov (KGZ)	3
Syrbaz Talgat (KAZ)	2

Repechage round 1
Servet Coşkun (TUR)	13
Orts Isakov (JOR)	8

Bronze medal match
Servet Coşkun (TUR)	6
Mulayam Yadav (IND)	6
Giorgi Elbakidze (GEO)	0
Ernazar Akmataliev (KGZ)	9

==== Men's freestyle 74 kg ====
Round of 32
	Score	
Lu Feng (CHN)	8–4	Adilet Zhaparkulov (KGZ)
Kelan Awusayiman (CHN)	1–7	Darkhan Yessengali (KAZ)
Ilyas Bekbulatov (UZB)	16–5	Xia Shengsong (CHN)
Alinur Takirov (KGZ)	1–6	Nurkozha Kaipanov (KAZ)
Erzo Isakov (JOR)	0–11	Daniyar Kaisanov (KAZ)
Dzhabrail Gadzhiev (AZE)	3–2	Amr Reda Hussen (EGY)

Round of 16
Soner Demirtaş (TUR)	10
Kubat Azizbaev (KGZ)	0
Lu Feng (CHN)	0
Turan Bayramov (AZE)	7
Khadzhimurad Gadzhiyev (AZE)	10
Darkhan Yessengali (KAZ)	0
Ilyas Bekbulatov (UZB)
Olonbayaryn Süldkhüü (MGL)	WO
Magomet Evloev (TJK)	8
Nurkozha Kaipanov (KAZ)	6
Daniyar Kaisanov (KAZ)	2
Zandanbudyn Sumiyaabazar (MGL)	3
Magomedrasul Asluev (BHR)	4
Dzhabrail Gadzhiev (AZE)	5
Adam Thomson (CAN)	1
Otari Bagauri (GEO)	8

Quarterfinals
Soner Demirtaş (TUR)	5
Turan Bayramov (AZE)	10
Khadzhimurad Gadzhiyev (AZE)	4^{F}
Olonbayaryn Süldkhüü (MGL)	2
Magomet Evloev (TJK)	2
Zandanbudyn Sumiyaabazar (MGL)	0
Dzhabrail Gadzhiev (AZE)	4
Otari Bagauri (GEO)	1

Semifinals
Turan Bayramov (AZE)	7
Khadzhimurad Gadzhiyev (AZE)	4
Magomet Evloev (TJK)	3
Dzhabrail Gadzhiev (AZE)	3

Final
Turan Bayramov (AZE)	2
Dzhabrail Gadzhiev (AZE)	1

Repechage round 1
Amr Reda Hussen (EGY)	4
Magomedrasul Asluev (BHR)	5

Repechage round 2
Lu Feng (CHN)	2
Soner Demirtaş (TUR)	5
Magomedrasul Asluev (BHR)	1
Otari Bagauri (GEO)	1

Bronze medals
Soner Demirtaş (TUR)	7
Khadzhimurad Gadzhiyev (AZE)	12
Otari Bagauri (GEO)	0
Magomet Evloev (TJK)	2^{F}

==== Men's freestyle 79 kg ====
Round of 16
Ayidusi Hade (CHN)	WO
Daulet Yergesh (KAZ)

Quarterfinals
Zhiger Zakirov (KAZ)	9
Ayidusi Hade (CHN)	0
Vladimeri Gamkrelidze (GEO)	10
Myrza Zhyrgalbek Uulu (KGZ)	0
Aheiyou Tu Erxun (CHN)	1
Bibarys Nuryllauly (KAZ)	6
Adilet Maratbaev (KGZ)	0
Khidir Saipudinov (BHR)	10

Semifinals
Zhiger Zakirov (KAZ)	1
Vladimeri Gamkrelidze (GEO)	9
Bibarys Nuryllauly (KAZ)	1
Khidir Saipudinov (BHR)	3

Final
Vladimeri Gamkrelidze (GEO)	3
Khidir Saipudinov (BHR)	2

Bronze medal match
Myrza Zhyrgalbek Uulu (KGZ)	0
Zhiger Zakirov (KAZ)	11
Adilet Maratbaev (KGZ)	10
Bibarys Nuryllauly (KAZ)	7

==== Men's freestyle 86 kg ====
Round of 32
	Score	
Jointy Kumar (IND)	9–2	Gangsuhe (CHN)
Taimuraz Friev (ESP)	3–5	Abaiyi Jumabieke (CHN)
Nurzhan Issagaliyev (KAZ)	0–10	Zaur Beradze (GEO)
Sun Xiao (CHN)	10–10	Mukhammad Abdullaev (KGZ)
Osman Göçen (TUR)	10–5	Bobur Islomov (UZB)

Round of 16
Deepak Punia (IND)	10
Islyambek Ilyassov (KAZ)	1
Jointy Kumar (IND)	0
Tariel Gaphrindashvili (GEO)	10
Magomed Sharipov (BHR)	10
Abaiyi Jumabieke (CHN)	0
Zaur Beradze (GEO)	1
Javrail Shapiev (UZB)	5
Byambasürengiin Bat-Erdene (MGL)	0
Abubakr Abakarov (AZE)	7
Sun Xiao (CHN)	0
Nurtilek Karypbaev (KGZ)	5
Deepak Mirka (IND)	2
Osman Göçen (TUR)	9
Sebastian Jezierzański (POL)	2
Azamat Dauletbekov (KAZ)	5

Quarterfinals
Deepak Punia (IND)	3
Tariel Gaphrindashvili (GEO)	5
Magomed Sharipov (BHR)	8
Javrail Shapiev (UZB)	4
Abubakr Abakarov (AZE)	5
Nurtilek Karypbaev (KGZ)	0
Osman Göçen (TUR)	9
Azamat Dauletbekov (KAZ)	5^{F}

Semifinals
Tariel Gaphrindashvili (GEO)	0
Magomed Sharipov (BHR)	10
Abubakr Abakarov (AZE)	3
Azamat Dauletbekov (KAZ)	2

Final
Magomed Sharipov (BHR)	WO
Abubakr Abakarov (AZE)

Repechage round 2
Abaiyi Jumabieke (CHN)	1
Javrail Shapiev (UZB)	2
Byambasürengiin Bat-Erdene (MGL)	1
Nurtilek Karypbaev (KGZ)	5

Bronze medal match
Javrail Shapiev (UZB)	10
Tariel Gaphrindashvili (GEO)	9
Nurtilek Karypbaev (KGZ)	0
Azamat Dauletbekov (KAZ)	6

==== Men's freestyle 92 kg ====
Quarterfinals		Semifinals		Final
Nurdaulet Bekenov (KAZ)	0
Miriani Maisuradze (GEO)	11	Miriani Maisuradze (GEO)	10
Andro Margishvili (GEO)	12	Andro Margishvili (GEO)	0
Yeskali Dauletkazy (KAZ)	4			Miriani Maisuradze (GEO)	6
Rustam Shodiev (UZB)	3			Ganbaataryn Gankhuyag (MGL)	1
Aergen Jumabayi (CHN)	3	Aergen Jumabayi (CHN)	2
Ganbaataryn Gankhuyag (MGL)	7	Ganbaataryn Gankhuyag (MGL)	5
Abdimanap Baigenzheyev (KAZ)	1

Bronze medal match
Nurdaulet Bekenov (KAZ)	2
Andro Margishvili (GEO)	6
Abdimanap Baigenzheyev (KAZ)	0
Aergen Jumabayi (CHN)	2

==== Men's freestyle 97 kg ====
Round of 16
Mostafa El-Ders (EGY)	2
Nursultan Azov (KAZ)	4
Muheite Tuerxunbieke (CHN)	7
Alatangalida (CHN)	1
Ölziisaikhany Batzul (MGL)	7
Deepak Nehra (IND)	9
Bekzat Urkimbay (KAZ)	6
Arslanbek Turdubekov (KGZ)	1
Akhmed Tazhudinov (BHR)	10
Serik Bakytkhanov (KAZ)	0
Radosław Baran (POL)	5
Magomed Ibragimov (UZB)	6
İbrahim Çiftçi (TUR)	5
Makhsud Veysalov (UZB)	0

Quarterfinals
Habila Awusayiman (CHN)	3
Nursultan Azov (KAZ)	0
Muheite Tuerxunbieke (CHN)	8
Deepak Nehra (IND)	2
Bekzat Urkimbay (KAZ)	2
Akhmed Tazhudinov (BHR)	5
Magomed Ibragimov (UZB)	6
İbrahim Çiftçi (TUR)	4

Semifinals
Habila Awusayiman (CHN)	6
Muheite Tuerxunbieke (CHN)	3
Akhmed Tazhudinov (BHR)	10
Magomed Ibragimov (UZB)	0

Final
Habila Awusayiman (CHN)	1
Akhmed Tazhudinov (BHR)	10

Repechage round 1
Serik Bakytkhanov (KAZ)	2
Bekzat Urkimbay (KAZ)	3

Bronze medal match
Nursultan Azov (KAZ)	2
Muheite Tuerxunbieke (CHN)	2
Bekzat Urkimbay (KAZ)	2
Magomed Ibragimov (UZB)	5

==== Men's freestyle 125 kg ====
Round of 16
Aiaal Lazarev (KGZ)	0
Rusidanmu Reheman (CHN)	4^{F}
Mönkhtöriin Lkhagvagerel (MGL)	5
Anirudh Gulia (IND)	0
Buheeerdun (CHN)	8
Muzafar Zhappuev (KGZ)	5
Solomon Manashvili (GEO)	3
Omar Eyubov (KAZ)	0
Deng Zhiwei (CHN)	3
Geno Petriashvili (GEO)	4
Catriel Muriel (ARG)
Robert Baran (POL)	WO
Yusup Batirmurzaev (KAZ)	2
Khasanboy Rakhimov (UZB)	8^{F}

Quarterfinals
Sardorbek Kholmatov (UZB)	6
Rusidanmu Reheman (CHN)	3
Mönkhtöriin Lkhagvagerel (MGL)	4
Buheeerdun (CHN)	4
Solomon Manashvili (GEO)	3
Geno Petriashvili (GEO)	8
Robert Baran (POL)	1
Khasanboy Rakhimov (UZB)	5

Semifinals
Sardorbek Kholmatov (UZB)	8
Buheeerdun (CHN)	4
Geno Petriashvili (GEO)	10
Khasanboy Rakhimov (UZB)	0

Final
Sardorbek Kholmatov (UZB)	1
Geno Petriashvili (GEO)	12

Repechage round 1
Deng Zhiwei (CHN)	9
Solomon Manashvili (GEO)	2

Bronze medal match
Rusidanmu Reheman (CHN)	2
Buheeerdun (CHN)	4
Deng Zhiwei (CHN)	5
Khasanboy Rakhimov (UZB)	0

=== Men's Greco-Roman ===
==== Men's Greco-Roman 55 kg ====
Round of 16
~~Pouya Dadmarz (IRI)~~
Marlan Mukashev (KAZ)	WO

Quarterfinals
Jasurbek Ortikboev (UZB)	0
Marlan Mukashev (KAZ)	9
Nugzari Tsurtsumia (GEO)	0
Amangali Bekbolatov (KAZ)	9
Ikhtiyor Botirov (UZB)	13
Manjeet Chahar (IND)	4
Taalaibek Beishenbek Uulu (KGZ)	0
Yersin Abyir (KAZ)	9

Semifinals
Marlan Mukashev (KAZ)	9
Amangali Bekbolatov (KAZ)	3
Ikhtiyor Botirov (UZB)	7
Yersin Abyir (KAZ)	5

Final
Marlan Mukashev (KAZ)	4
Ikhtiyor Botirov (UZB)	2

Repechage round 1
~~Pouya Dadmarz (IRI)~~
Jasurbek Ortikboev (UZB)	WO

Bronze medal match
Jasurbek Ortikboev (UZB)	1
Amangali Bekbolatov (KAZ)	4
Manjeet Chahar (IND)	14
Yersin Abyir (KAZ)	9

==== Men's Greco-Roman 60 kg ====
Round of 16
Balbai Dordokov (KGZ)	0
Nursultan Bazarbayev (KAZ)	9
Pridon Abuladze (GEO)	9
Olzhas Sultan (KAZ)	1
Yernar Fidakhmetov (KAZ)	9
Akyl Sulaimanov (KGZ)	0
Umit Durdyýew (TKM)	0
Răzvan Arnăut (ROU)	8
Cao Liguo (CHN)	1
Mehdi Mohsennejad (IRI)	10
Islomjon Bakhromov (UZB)	5
Tuo Erbatu (CHN)	3
Tan Haodong (CHN)	1
Aftandil Taalaibek Uulu (KGZ)	1

Quarterfinals
Sumit Dalal (IND)	0
Nursultan Bazarbayev (KAZ)	9
Pridon Abuladze (GEO)	4
Yernar Fidakhmetov (KAZ)	9
Răzvan Arnăut (ROU)	2
Mehdi Mohsennejad (IRI)	7
Islomjon Bakhromov (UZB)	10
Aftandil Taalaibek Uulu (KGZ)	2

Semifinals
Nursultan Bazarbayev (KAZ)	9
Yernar Fidakhmetov (KAZ)	0
Mehdi Mohsennejad (IRI)	3
Islomjon Bakhromov (UZB)	3

Final
Nursultan Bazarbayev (KAZ)	0
Islomjon Bakhromov (UZB)	6

Repechage round 1
Balbai Dordokov (KGZ)	8
Sumit Dalal (IND)	0
Tuo Erbatu (CHN)	6
Avtandil Taalaibek Uulu (KGZ)	14

Bronze medal match
Balbai Dordokov (KGZ)	6
Yernar Fidakhmetov (KAZ)	11
Aftandil Taalaibek Uulu (KGZ)	0
Mehdi Mohsennejad (IRI)	8

==== Men's Greco-Roman 63 kg ====
Round of 16
Leri Abuladze (GEO)	6
Reheti Geminghan (CHN)	1
Yernur Fidakhmetov (KAZ)	7
Chen Wenjie (CHN)	1

Quarterfinals
Madiyar Maltekbayev (KAZ)	3
Leri Abuladze (GEO)	4
Iman Mohammadi (IRI)	5
Dastan Zarlykhanov (KAZ)	1
Dastan Kadyrov (KGZ)	3
Shermukhammad Sharibjanov (UZB)	3
Yernur Fidakhmetov (KAZ)	4
Baiaman Karimov (KGZ)	5

Semifinals
Leri Abuladze (GEO)	6
Iman Mohammadi (IRI)	5
Shermukhammad Sharibjanov (UZB)	8
Baiaman Karimov (KGZ)	4

Final
Leri Abuladze (GEO)	7
Shermukhammad Sharibjanov (UZB)	4

Repechage round 1
Reheti Geminghan (CHN)	3
Madiyar Maltekbayev (KAZ)	1

Bronze medal match
Reheti Geminghan (CHN)	0
Iman Mohammadi (IRI)	6
Dastan Kadyrov (KGZ)	9
Baiaman Karimov (KGZ)	0

==== Men's Greco-Roman 67 kg ====
Round of 16
Husiyuetu (CHN)	9
Neeraj Chhikara (IND)	0
Amanat Samat Uulu (KGZ)	5
Mahmud Bakhshilloev (UZB)	11
Merey Bekenov (KAZ)	2
Daniyar Kalenov (KAZ)	6
Luis Orta (CUB)	9
Tynar Sharshenbekov (KGZ)	1
Walihan Sailike (CHN)	1
Amantur Ismailov (KGZ)	3
Li Lei (CHN)	0
Sultan Assetuly (KAZ)	4^{F}
Mihai Mihuț (ROU)	2
Joni Khetsuriani (GEO)	4
Abror Atabaev (UZB)	5
Danial Sohrabi (IRI)	7

Quarterfinals
Husiyuetu (CHN)	3
Mahmud Bakhshilloev (UZB)	2
Daniyar Kalenov (KAZ)	1
Luis Orta (CUB)	5
Amantur Ismailov (KGZ)	0
Sultan Assetuly (KAZ)	10
Joni Khetsuriani (GEO)	5
Danial Sohrabi (IRI)	6

Semifinals
Husiyuetu (CHN)	9
Luis Orta (CUB)	0
Sultan Assetuly (KAZ)	2
Danial Sohrabi (IRI)	10

Final
Husiyuetu (CHN)	2
Danial Sohrabi (IRI)	8

Repechage round 1
Neeraj Chhikara (IND)	2
Mahmud Bakhshilloev (UZB)	5
Abror Atabaev (UZB)	4^{F}
Joni Khetsuriani (GEO)	6

Bronze medal match
Mahmud Bakhshilloev (UZB)	1
Luis Orta (CUB)	7
Abror Atabaev (UZB)	11
Sultan Assetuly (KAZ)	1

==== Men's Greco-Roman 72 kg ====
Round of 16
Otar Abuladze (GEO)	3
Mohammad Reza Geraei (IRI)	9
Khabibullo Tynchtyk Uulu (KGZ)	0
Ramaz Zoidze (GEO)	10

Quarterfinals
Adilkhan Satayev (KAZ)	0
Mohammad Reza Geraei (IRI)	11
Doniyorkhon Nakibov (UZB)	5
Vikas Dalal (IND)	6
Abdullo Aliev (UZB)	4
Selçuk Can (TUR)	3
Ramaz Zoidze (GEO)	9
Yerassyl Nurbossynov (KAZ)	0

Semifinals
Mohammad Reza Geraei (IRI)	3
Vikas Dalal (IND)	1
Abdullo Aliev (UZB)	0
Ramaz Zoidze (GEO)	4

Final
Mohammad Reza Geraei (IRI)	1
Ramaz Zoidze (GEO)	11

Repechage round 1
Otar Abuladze (GEO)	8
Adilkhan Satayev (KAZ)	0
Khabibullo Tynchtyk Uulu (KGZ)	1
Yerassyl Nurbossynov (KAZ)	4^{F}

Bronze medal match
Otar Abuladze (GEO)	2^{F}
Vikas Dalal (IND)	0
Yerassyl Nurbossynov (KAZ)	0
Abdullo Aliev (UZB)	9

==== Men's Greco-Roman 77 kg ====
Round of 16
Azat Sadykov (KAZ)	2
Sachino Davitaia (GEO)	3
Alibek Berdiev (KGZ)	0
Liu Rui (CHN)	8
Sajan Bhanwal (IND)	0
Mohammad Ali Geraei (IRI)	8
Yunus Emre Başar (TUR)	8
Ziyini Yesitai (CHN)	1
Bekzat Orunkul Uulu (KGZ)	1
Kaharman Kissymetov (KAZ)	2
Bahejiang Halishan (CHN)	1
Yüksel Sarıçiçek (TUR)	5
Iuri Lomadze (GEO)	4
Maxat Yerezhepov (KAZ)	3
Renat Iliaz Uulu (KGZ)	1
Samandar Bobonazarov (UZB)	7^{F}

Quarterfinals
Sachino Davitaia (GEO)	3
Liu Rui (CHN)	5
Mohammad Ali Geraei (IRI)	8^{F}
Yunus Emre Başar (TUR)	2
Kaharman Kissymetov (KAZ)	3
Yüksel Sarıçiçek (TUR)	5
Iuri Lomadze (GEO)	9
Samandar Bobonazarov (UZB)	0

Semifinals
Liu Rui (CHN)	6
Mohammad Ali Geraei (IRI)	4^{F}
Yüksel Sarıçiçek (TUR)	1
Iuri Lomadze (GEO)	7

Final
Mohammad Ali Geraei (IRI)	8
Iuri Lomadze (GEO)	3

Repechage round 1
Sajan Bhanwal (IND)	5^{F}
Yunus Emre Başar (TUR)	0
Maxat Yerezhepov (KAZ)	4
Samandar Bobonazarov (UZB)	7

Bronze medal match
Sajan Bhanwal (IND)	5
Liu Rui (CHN)	7
Samandar Bobonazarov (UZB)	0
Yüksel Sarıçiçek (TUR)	8

==== Men's Greco-Roman 82 kg ====
Round of 16
Gela Bolkvadze (GEO)	9
Temirlan Bekturdiev (KGZ)	0
Alireza Mohmadi (IRI)	8
Jeýhun Owezdurdyýew (TKM)	0
Rohit Dahiya (IND)	0
Mukhammadkodir Rasulov (UZB)	9
~~Dias Kalen (KAZ)~~
Nurbek Khashimbekov (UZB)	WO

Quarterfinals
Ruslan Tsarev (KGZ)	0
Gela Bolkvadze (GEO)	9
Alireza Mohmadi (IRI)	9
Shamil Batyrov (KAZ)	1
Beksultan Nazarbaev (KGZ)	5
Mukhammadkodir Rasulov (UZB)	1
Nurbek Khashimbekov (UZB)	0
Alperen Berber (TUR)	7

Semifinals
Gela Bolkvadze (GEO)	1
Alireza Mohmadi (IRI)	4
Beksultan Nazarbaev (KGZ)	1
Alperen Berber (TUR)	9

Final
Alireza Mohmadi (IRI)	7
Alperen Berber (TUR)	5

Repechage round 1
Jeýhun Owezdurdyýew (TKM)	1
Shamil Batyrov (KAZ)	7^{F}

Bronze medal match
Shamil Batyrov (KAZ)	0
Gela Bolkvadze (GEO)	9
Nurbek Khashimbekov (UZB)	4
Beksultan Nazarbaev (KGZ)	5

==== Men's Greco-Roman 87 kg ====
Round of 16
Azamat Kustubayev (KAZ)	3
Kalidin Asykeev (KGZ)	1
Ali Cengiz (TUR)	4
Nasser Alizadeh (IRI)	1
Peng Fei (CHN)	1
Gurami Khetsuriani (GEO)	5
Melis Aitbekov (KGZ)	8
Baurzhan Mussin (KAZ)	0
Nursultan Tursynov (KAZ)	1
Jalgasbay Berdimuratov (UZB)	1
Ayidingbieke Talimubieke (CHN)	1
Qian Haitao (CHN)	5
Azat Salidinov (KGZ)	4
Sunil Kumar (IND)	2

Quarterfinals
Şyhazberdi Öwelekow (TKM)	2
Azamat Kustubayev (KAZ)	7
Ali Cengiz (TUR)	1
Gurami Khetsuriani (GEO)	4
Melis Aitbekov (KGZ)	0
Jalgasbay Berdimuratov (UZB)	9
Qian Haitao (CHN)	0
Azat Salidinov (KGZ)	8

Semifinals
Azamat Kustubayev (KAZ)	1
Gurami Khetsuriani (GEO)	5
Jalgasbay Berdimuratov (UZB)	8
Azat Salidinov (KGZ)	0

Final
Gurami Khetsuriani (GEO)	3
Jalgasbay Berdimuratov (UZB)	5

Repechage round 1
Peng Fei (CHN)	3
Ali Cengiz (TUR)	3
Nursultan Tursynov (KAZ)	7
Melis Aitbekov (KGZ)	4

Bronze medal match
Ali Cengiz (TUR)	1
Azamat Kustubayev (KAZ)	1
Nursultan Tursynov (KAZ)	WO
Azat Salidinov (KGZ)

==== Men's Greco-Roman 97 kg ====
Round of 16
Yerulan Iskakov (KAZ)	3
Zhantas Nurgali (KAZ)	4
Liu Yan (CHN)	3
Olzhas Syrlybay (KAZ)	1
Li Yiming (CHN)	1
Beksultan Makhmudov (KGZ)	1
Rustam Assakalov (UZB)	2
Narinder Cheema (IND)	0
Mehdi Bali (IRI)	7
Uzur Dzhuzupbekov (KGZ)	2
Arkyt Orozbekov (KGZ)	3
Chen Yanan (CHN)	0^{R}
Mohammad Hadi Saravi (IRI)	12
Artur Omarov (CZE)	0

Quarterfinals
Amanberdi Agamämmedow (TKM)	0
Zhantas Nurgali (KAZ)	8
Liu Yan (CHN)	1
Li Yiming (CHN)	2
Rustam Assakalov (UZB)	3
Mehdi Bali (IRI)	6
Arkyt Orozbekov (KGZ)	0
Mohammad Hadi Saravi (IRI)	3

Semifinals
Zhantas Nurgali (KAZ)	3
Li Yiming (CHN)	5
Mehdi Bali (IRI)	1
Mohammad Hadi Saravi (IRI)	7

Final
Li Yiming (CHN)	1
Mohammad Hadi Saravi (IRI)	3

Repechage round 1
Beksultan Makhmudov (KGZ)	3
Liu Yan (CHN)	1
Artur Omarov (CZE)	4
Arkyt Orozbekov (KGZ)	0

Bronze medal match
Beksultan Makhmudov (KGZ)	3
Zhantas Nurgali (KAZ)	1
Artur Omarov (CZE)	5
Mehdi Bali (IRI)	1

==== Men's Greco-Roman 130 kg ====
Round of 16
Temurbek Nasimov (UZB)	1
Alin Alexuc-Ciurariu (ROU)	4
Meng Lingzhe (CHN)	8
Sahil Una (IND)	0
Osman Yıldırım (TUR)	1
Amin Mirzazadeh (IRI)	4
Fatih Bozkurt (TUR)	8
Haiyishaoer Teliuhan (CHN)	0
Anton Savenko (KAZ)	9
Mansur Shadukayev (KAZ)	0
Jiang Wenhao (CHN)	4
Sulkhan Buidze (GEO)	7

Quarterfinals
Assylbek Abdikalyk (KAZ)	0
Alin Alexuc-Ciurariu (ROU)	4
Meng Lingzhe (CHN)	1
Amin Mirzazadeh (IRI)	2
Fatih Bozkurt (TUR)	5
Anton Savenko (KAZ)	2
Sulkhan Buidze (GEO)	0
Óscar Pino (CUB)	11

Semifinals
~~Alin Alexuc-Ciurariu (ROU)~~
Amin Mirzazadeh (IRI)	WO
Fatih Bozkurt (TUR)	3
Óscar Pino (CUB)	5

Final
Amin Mirzazadeh (IRI)	2
Óscar Pino (CUB)	1

Repechage round 1
Osman Yıldırım (TUR)	5
Meng Lingzhe (CHN)	0

Bronze medal match
Osman Yıldırım (TUR)	WO
~~Alin Alexuc-Ciurariu (ROU)~~
Sulkhan Buidze (GEO)	0
Fatih Bozkurt (TUR)	9

=== Women's freestyle ===
==== Women's freestyle 50 kg ====
Round of 16
Gulzhazira Amantayeva (KAZ)	0
Kamila Barbosa (BRA)	2
Feng Ziqi (CHN)	8
Evin Demirhan (TUR)	4
Madison Parks (CAN)	2
Oksana Livach (UKR)	9

Quarterfinals
Jasmina Immaeva (UZB)	3
Kamila Barbosa (BRA)	0
Lei Chun (CHN)	2
Fan Meng (CHN)	3
Neelam Sirohi (IND)	4
Feng Ziqi (CHN)	15^{F}
Oksana Livach (UKR)	10
Svetlana Ankicheva (KAZ)	0

Semifinals
Jasmina Immaeva (UZB)	6
Fan Meng (CHN)	12
Feng Ziqi (CHN)	4
Oksana Livach (UKR)	5

Final
Fan Meng (CHN)	4
Oksana Livach (UKR)	4

Repechage round 1
Madison Parks (CAN)	7
Svetlana Ankicheva (KAZ)	10

Bronze medal match
Lei Chun (CHN)	2
Jasmina Immaeva (UZB)	1
Svetlana Ankicheva (KAZ)	0
Feng Ziqi (CHN)	6^{F}

==== Women's freestyle 53 kg ====
Round of 16
Stalvira Orshush (HUN)	0
Batkhuyagiin Khulan (MGL)	8
Laura Almaganbetova (KAZ)	0
Zhang Min (CHN)	10
Aktenge Keunimjaeva (UZB)	0
Lucía Yépez (ECU)	11
Jiang Meiying (CHN)	4
Pooja Gehlot (IND)	0
Liliia Malanchuk (UKR)	4^{F}
Shokhida Akhmedova (UZB)	2

Quarterfinals
Lilya Horishna (UKR)	0
Batkhuyagiin Khulan (MGL)	11
Zhang Min (CHN)	2
Lucía Yépez (ECU)	3
Ganbaataryn Otgonjargal (MGL)	8
Jiang Meiying (CHN)	4
Liliia Malanchuk (UKR)	6
Bat-Ochiryn Bolortuyaa (MGL)	12^{F}

Semifinals
Batkhuyagiin Khulan (MGL)	8^{F}
Lucía Yépez (ECU)	1
Ganbaataryn Otgonjargal (MGL)	3^{F}
Bat-Ochiryn Bolortuyaa (MGL)	0

Final
Batkhuyagiin Khulan (MGL)	8
Ganbaataryn Otgonjargal (MGL)	0

Repechage round 1
Stalvira Orshush (HUN)	4
Lilya Horishna (UKR)	2

Bronze medal match
Stalvira Orshush (HUN)	0
Lucía Yépez (ECU)	4
Jiang Meiying (CHN)	0
Bat-Ochiryn Bolortuyaa (MGL)	10^{F}

==== Women's freestyle 55 kg ====
3 June

Pos	Athlete	Pld	W	L	CP	TP	CAN	UKR	IND
1	Karla Godinez (CAN)	2	2	0	6	10	—	4–2	6–6
2	Mariia Vynnyk (UKR)	2	1	1	4	9	1–3 VPO1	—	7–5
3	Sito (IND)	2	0	2	2	11	1–3 VPO1	1–3 VPO1	—

Source: UWW

Pos	Athlete	Pld	W	L	CP	TP	KAZ	TUR	KAZ
1	Marina Sedneva (KAZ)	2	2	0	8	14	—	8–0 Fall	6–0
2	Melda Dernekçi (TUR)	2	1	1	3	6	0–5 VFA	—	6–1
3	Zulfiya Yakhyarova (KAZ)	2	0	2	1	1	0–3 VPO	1–3 VPO1	—

Source: UWW

Semifinals
Karla Godinez (CAN)	5
Melda Dernekçi (TUR)	2
Marina Sedneva (KAZ)	2^{F}
Mariia Vynnyk (UKR)	4

Final
Karla Godinez (CAN)	1
Marina Sedneva (KAZ)	3
Bronze medal
Melda Dernekçi (TUR)	3
Mariia Vynnyk (UKR)	14

==== Women's freestyle 57 kg ====
Quarterfinals		Semifinals		Final
Zhala Aliyeva (AZE)	1
Hong Kexin (CHN)	12	Hong Kexin (CHN)	8^{F}
Elvira Kamaloğlu (TUR)	9	Elvira Kamaloğlu (TUR)	3
Luisa Valverde (ECU)	6			Hong Kexin (CHN)	4
Emma Tissina (KAZ)	0			Alina Hrushyna (UKR)	7
Alina Hrushyna (UKR)	10	Alina Hrushyna (UKR)	7
Zhuomalaga (CHN)	11^{F}	Zhuomalaga (CHN)	0
Laylokhon Sobirova (UZB)	2

Bronze medal match
Zhala Aliyeva (AZE)	8
Elvira Kamaloğlu (TUR)	4
Emma Tissina (KAZ)	0
Zhuomalaga (CHN)	6

==== Women's freestyle 59 kg ====
3 June

Pos	Athlete	Pld	W	L	CP	TP	IND	KAZ	TUR
1	Sarita Mor (IND)	2	2	0	6	11	—	7–0	4–0
2	Diana Kayumova (KAZ)	2	1	1	5	7	0–3 VPO	—	7–2 Fall
3	Ebru Dağbaşı (TUR)	2	0	2	0	2	0–3 VPO	0–5 VFA	—

Source: UWW

Pos	Athlete	Pld	W	L	CP	TP	UKR	UKR	NOR
1	Yuliya Tkach (UKR)	2	2	0	10	12	—	6–0 Fall	6–0 Fall
2	Solomiia Vynnyk (UKR)	2	1	1	4	12	0–5 VFA	—	12–1
3	Othelie Høie (NOR)	2	0	2	1	1	0–5 VFA	1–4 VSU1	—

Source: UWW

Semifinals
Sarita Mor (IND)	4
Solomiia Vynnyk (UKR)	5
Yuliya Tkach (UKR)	10
Diana Kayumova (KAZ)	0

Final
Solomiia Vynnyk (UKR)	6
Yuliya Tkach (UKR)	9
Bronze medal
Sarita Mor (IND)	11
Diana Kayumova (KAZ)	0

==== Women's freestyle 62 kg ====
Round of 16
Dilfuza Aimbetova (UZB)	1
Elis Manolova (AZE)	5^{F}
Sükheegiin Tserenchimed (MGL)	7
Iryna Koliadenko (UKR)	2
Ilona Prokopevniuk (UKR)	8
Ana Godinez (CAN)	3
Sonam Malik (IND)	3
Long Jia (CHN)	5

Quarterfinals
Luisa Niemesch (GER)	2
Elis Manolova (AZE)	1
Sükheegiin Tserenchimed (MGL)	4
Pürevdorjiin Orkhon (MGL)	6
Lydia Pérez (ESP)	1
Ilona Prokopevniuk (UKR)	12
Long Jia (CHN)	15
Grace Bullen (NOR)	10

Semifinals
Luisa Niemesch (GER)	0
Pürevdorjiin Orkhon (MGL)	3
Ilona Prokopevniuk (UKR)	10
Long Jia (CHN)	0

Final
Pürevdorjiin Orkhon (MGL)	3
Ilona Prokopevniuk (UKR)	8

Repechage round 1
Ana Godinez (CAN)	10
Lydia Pérez (ESP)	0

Bronze medal match
Sükheegiin Tserenchimed (MGL)	8
Luisa Niemesch (GER)	3
Ana Godinez (CAN)	6
Long Jia (CHN)	7

==== Women's freestyle 65 kg ====
3 June

Pos	Athlete	Pld	W	L	CP	TP	IND	KAZ	UKR	MGL	KAZ
1	Manisha Bhanwala (IND)	4	4	0	15	42	—	15–4	6–2	10–0	11–0
2	Irina Kazyulina (KAZ)	4	2	2	11	11	1–4 VSU1	—	0–5 Fall	4–2 Fall	3–2 Fall
3	Yulia Leskovets (UKR)	4	2	2	10	19	1–3 VPO1	5–0 VFA	—	0–4 Fall	12–1
4	Ölziisaikhany Pürevsüren (MGL)	4	2	2	10	6	0–4 VSU	0–5 VFA	5–0 VFA	—	WO
5	Gaukhar Mukatay (KAZ)	4	0	4	1	3	0–4 VSU	0–5 VFA	1–4 VSU1	0–5 VIN	—

Source: UWW

==== Women's freestyle 68 kg ====
Round of 16
Enkhsaikhany Delgermaa (MGL)	11
Svetlana Oknazarova (UZB)	0
Nisha Dahiya (IND)	1
Firuza Esenbaeva (UZB)	12

Quarterfinals
Olivia Di Bacco (CAN)	1
Enkhsaikhany Delgermaa (MGL)	6
Yelena Shalygina (KAZ)	1
Meerim Zhumanazarova (KGZ)	1
Zhou Xinru (CHN)	1
Zhou Feng (CHN)	12
Firuza Esenbaeva (UZB)	0
Nesrin Baş (TUR)	3

Semifinals
Enkhsaikhany Delgermaa (MGL)	2
Meerim Zhumanazarova (KGZ)	1
Zhou Feng (CHN)	3
Nesrin Baş (TUR)	1

Final
Enkhsaikhany Delgermaa (MGL)	5
Zhou Feng (CHN)	14

Repechage round 1
Svetlana Oknazarova (UZB)	4
Olivia Di Bacco (CAN)	14

Bronze medal match
Olivia Di Bacco (CAN)	1
Meerim Zhumanazarova (KGZ)	2
Zhou Xinru (CHN)	1
Nesrin Baş (TUR)	3

==== Women's freestyle 72 kg ====
3 June

Pos	Athlete	Pld	W	L	CP	TP	KAZ	IND	ITA
1	Zhamila Bakbergenova (KAZ)	2	2	0	6	10	—	4–0	6–0
2	Reetika Hooda (IND)	2	1	1	3	7	0–3 VPO	—	7–0
3	Dalma Caneva (ITA)	2	0	2	0	0	0–3 VPO	0–3 VPO	—

Source: UWW

==== Women's freestyle 76 kg ====
Round of 16
Anastasiia Osniach (UKR)	0
Priya Malik (IND)	6
Aiperi Medet Kyzy (KGZ)	4
Gulmaral Yerkebayeva (KAZ)	1
Epp Mäe (EST)	0
Génesis Reasco (ECU)	5
Martina Kuenz (AUT)	4
Cynthia Vescan (FRA)	1

Quarterfinals
Qiandegenchagan (CHN)	10
Priya Malik (IND)	1
Aiperi Medet Kyzy (KGZ)	10
Anastasiya Alpyeyeva (UKR)	6
Huang Yuanyuan (CHN)	7
Génesis Reasco (ECU)	4
Martina Kuenz (AUT)	10
Wang Juan (CHN)	0

Semifinals
Qiandegenchagan (CHN)	3
Aiperi Medet Kyzy (KGZ)	6
Huang Yuanyuan (CHN)	6
Martina Kuenz (AUT)	2^{R}

Final
Aiperi Medet Kyzy (KGZ)	5
Huang Yuanyuan (CHN)	3

Repechage round 1
Gulmaral Yerkebayeva (KAZ)	0
Anastasiya Alpyeyeva (UKR)	4^{F}

Bronze medal match
Anastasiya Alpyeyeva (UKR)	3
Qiandegenchagan (CHN)	8
Génesis Reasco (ECU)	WO
Martina Kuenz (AUT)
