= Uzbekistan at the 2021 Islamic Solidarity Games =

- IOC code: UZB
- NOC: National Olympic Committee of the Republic of Uzbekistan

in Konya, Turkey
- Competitors: 265
- Medals Ranked 2nd: Gold 51 Silver 42 Bronze 65 Total 158

Islamic Solidarity Games appearances (overview)
- 2005; 2013; 2017; 2021; 2025

Uzbekistan participated in the 2021 Islamic Solidarity Games held in Konya, Turkey from 9 to 18 August 2022.

The games had been rescheduled several times. In May 2021, the ISSF postponed the event to August 2022 citing the COVID-19 pandemic situation in the participating countries.

== Medalists ==
Medal	Name	Sport	Event	Date
Gold	Olga Zabelinskaya	Cycling	Women's points race	7 August
Gold	Olga Zabelinskaya	Cycling	Women's road race	13 August
Gold	Olga Zabelinskaya	Cycling	Women's individual time trial	14 August
Gold	Azizbek Boynazarov	Para swimming	Men's 100 m butterfly (S8-S10)	7 August
Gold	Azizbek Boynazarov	Para swimming	Men's 200 m individual medley (SM5-SM10)	8 August
Gold	Adkhamjon Ergashev	Weightlifting	Men's 67 kg snatch	12 August
Gold	Adkhamjon Ergashev	Weightlifting	Men's 67 kg total	12 August
Gold	Mukhammadkodir Toshtemirov	Weightlifting	Men's 81 kg snatch	13 August
Gold	Sarvarbek Zafarjonov	Weightlifting	Men's 89 kg snatch	14 August
Gold	Sarvarbek Zafarjonov	Weightlifting	Men's 89 kg Clean & Jerk	14 August
Gold	Sarvarbek Zafarjonov	Weightlifting	Men's 89 kg total	14 August
Gold	Ruslan Nurudinov	Weightlifting	Men's 109 kg snatch	15 August
Gold	Ruslan Nurudinov	Weightlifting	Men's 109 kg Clean & Jerk	15 August
Gold	Ruslan Nurudinov	Weightlifting	Men's 109 kg total	15 August
Gold	Akbar Djuraev	Weightlifting	Men's +109 kg snatch	15 August
Gold	Akbar Djuraev	Weightlifting	Men's +109 kg Clean & Jerk	15 August
Gold	Akbar Djuraev	Weightlifting	Men's +109 kg total	15 August
Gold	Tursunoy Jabborova	Weightlifting	Women's 87 kg snatch	15 August
Gold	Tursunoy Jabborova	Weightlifting	Women's 87 kg Clean & Jerk	15 August
Gold	Tursunoy Jabborova	Weightlifting	Women's 87 kg total	15 August
Gold	Gulomjon Abdullaev	Wrestling	Men's Freestyle 57 kg	10 August
Gold	Jahongirmirza Turobov	Wrestling	Men's Freestyle 61 kg	11 August
Gold	Jalgasbay Berdimuratov	Wrestling	Men's Greco-Roman 87 kg	13 August
Gold	Rustam Assakalov	Wrestling	Men's Greco-Roman 97 kg	12 August
Gold	Ulugbek Rashitov	Taekwondo	Men's 68 kg	10 August
Gold	Shukhrat Salaev	Taekwondo	Men's 80 kg	11 August
Gold	Feruza Sadikova	Taekwondo	Women's 62 kg	12 August
Gold	Svetlana Osipova	Taekwondo	Women's +73 kg	12 August
Gold	Omadbek Khasanov	Para athletics	Men's High jump T46-47	12 August
Gold	Uzbekistan rhythmic team	Gymnastics	Group 5 Hoops	13 August
Gold	Mukhammad Yusuf Asranov	Fencing	Men's foil individual	14 August
Gold	Sardor Nurillaev	Judo	Men's 66 kg	15 August
Gold	Shakhram Akhadov	Judo	Men's 73 kg	15 August
Gold	Diyora Keldiyorova	Judo	Women's 52 kg	15 August
Gold	Nilufar Ermaganbetova	Judo	Women's 57 kg	15 August
Silver	Yanina Kuskova	Cycling	Women's omnium	6 August
Silver	Yanina Kuskova	Cycling	Women's points race	7 August
Silver	Bakhtiyorjon Ortikov	Para swimming	Men's 50 m backstroke (S4-S5)	7 August
Silver	Azizbek Boynazarov	Para swimming	Men's 100 m backstroke (S6-S10)	7 August
Silver	Adkhamjon Ergashev	Weightlifting	Men's 67 kg Clean & Jerk	12 August
Silver	Doston Yokubov	Weightlifting	Men's 67 kg total	12 August
Silver	Jasurbek Ortikboev	Wrestling	Men's Greco-Roman 55 kg	12 August
Silver	Jasmina Immaeva	Wrestling	Women's freestyle 50 kg	10 August
Silver	Aktenge Keunimjaeva	Wrestling	Women's freestyle 53 kg	11 August
Silver	Shokhida Akhmedova	Wrestling	Women's freestyle 55 kg	12 August
Silver	Uzbekistan rhythmic team	Gymnastics	Rhythmic team	13 August
Silver	Uzbekistan rhythmic team	Gymnastics	Rhythmic Group All-Around	13 August
Silver	Uzbekistan rhythmic team	Gymnastics	Group 3 Ribbons + 2 Balls	13 August
Silver	Takhmina Ikromova	Gymnastics	Rhythmic ball	13 August
Silver	Takhmina Ikromova	Gymnastics	Rhythmic clubs	13 August
Silver	Takhmina Ikromova	Gymnastics	Rhythmic ribbon	13 August
Silver	Rasuljon Abdurakhimov; Abdulla Azimov; Khabibullo Ergashev	Gymnastics	Men's team	10 August
Silver	Margarita Misyurina	Cycling	Women's road race	13 August
Silver	Yanina Kuskova	Cycling	Women's individual time trial	14 August
Silver	Khurshidjon Tursunov	Swimming	Men's 50 m freestyle	15 August
Silver	Aleksey Tarasenko	Swimming	Men's 200 m freestyle	14 August
Silver	Aleksey Tarasenko; Eldorbek Usmonov	Swimming	Men's 4×100 m freestyle	13 August
Silver	Uzbekistan swimming team	Swimming	Men's 4×200 m freestyle	15 August
Silver	Uzbekistan fencing team	Fencing	Women's sabre team	15 August
Silver	Kemran Nurillaev	Judo	Men's 60 kg	15 August
Bronze	Sofiya Karimova	Cycling	Women's scratch	5 August
Bronze	Aleksey Fomovskiy	Cycling	Men's individual pursuit	6 August
Bronze	Sultonbek Nuriddinov	Para swimming	Men's 100 m butterfly (S8-S10)	7 August
Bronze	Aleksey Fomovskiy	Cycling	Men's omnium	8 August
Bronze	Mukhammadkodir Toshtemirov	Weightlifting	Men's 81 kg total	13 August
Bronze	Sharofiddin Amriddinov	Weightlifting	Men's 102 kg snatch	13 August
Bronze	Sunnatilla Usarov	Weightlifting	Men's 96 kg snatch	14 August
Bronze	Sunnatilla Usarov	Weightlifting	Men's 96 kg Clean & Jerk	14 August
Bronze	Sunnatilla Usarov	Weightlifting	Men's 96 kg total	14 August
Bronze	Nigora Suvonova	Weightlifting	Women's 76 kg snatch	14 August
Bronze	Rigina Adashbaeva	Weightlifting	Women's 81 kg snatch	14 August
Bronze	Ikhtiyor Navruzov	Wrestling	Men's Freestyle 74 kg	10 August
Bronze	Bekzod Abdurakhmonov	Wrestling	Men's Freestyle 79 kg	11 August
Bronze	Bobur Islomov	Wrestling	Men's Freestyle 92 kg	11 August
Bronze	Magomed Ibragimov	Wrestling	Men's Freestyle 97 kg	10 August
Bronze	Khasanboy Rakhimov	Wrestling	Men's Freestyle 125 kg	11 August
Bronze	Mukhammadkodir Yusupov	Wrestling	Men's Greco-Roman 60 kg	13 August
Bronze	Abror Atabaev	Wrestling	Men's Greco-Roman 67 kg	13 August
Bronze	Abror Atabaev	Wrestling	Men's Greco-Roman 67 kg	13 August
Bronze	Mirzobek Rakhmatov	Wrestling	Men's Greco-Roman 72 kg	12 August
Bronze	Mukhammadkodir Rasulov	Wrestling	Men's Greco-Roman 82 kg	12 August
Bronze	Dilfuza Aimbetova	Wrestling	Women's freestyle 59 kg	10 August
Bronze	Zukhrakhon Tojimatova	Taekwondo	Women's 46 kg	11 August
Bronze	Charos Kayumova	Taekwondo	Women's 53 kg	9 August
Bronze	Niyaz Pulatov	Taekwondo	Men's 63 kg	10 August
Bronze	Jasurbek Jaysunov	Taekwondo	Men's 63 kg	12 August
Bronze	Rasuljon Abdurakhimov	Gymnastics	Individual all-around	10 August
Bronze	Rasuljon Abdurakhimov	Gymnastics	Men's parallel bars	11 August
Bronze	Sabina Tashkenbaeva	Gymnastics	Rhythmic clubs	13 August
Bronze	Aleksey Fomovskiy	Cycling	Women's individual time trial	14 August
Bronze	Sultonbek Nuriddinov	Para swimming	Men's 100 m butterfly (S8-S10)	7 August
Bronze	Azizbek Boynazarov	Para swimming	Men's 100 m breaststroke (SB4-SB9)	7 August
Bronze	Aleksey Tarasenko	Swimming	Men's 50 m freestyle	15 August
Bronze	Egor Petryakov	Swimming	Men's 400 m freestyle	15 August
Bronze	Eldorbek Usmonov	Swimming	Men's 100 m butterfly	15 August
Bronze	Egor Petryakov	Swimming	Men's 400 m individual medley	15 August
Bronze	Umida Ilyosova	Fencing	Women's foil individual	15 August
Bronze	Ilyas Molina	Fencing	Men's foil individual	14 August
Bronze	Doniyor Sadullaev	Fencing	Men's foil individual	14 August
Bronze	Nodirbek Muminov	Fencing	Men's epee individual	15 August
Bronze	Fayzulla Alimov	Fencing	Men's epee individual	15 August
Bronze	Sita Kadamboeva	Judo	Women's 52 kg	15 August
Bronze	Sevinch Isokova	Judo	Women's 63 kg	15 August
Bronze	Rozalina Khadjieva; Sugdiyona Madalieva; Markhabo Magdieva	Table tennis	Women's team	11 August

Medals by sport
Sport	1st place, gold medalist(s)	2nd place, silver medalist(s)	3rd place, bronze medalist(s)	Total
Archery	0	0	1	1
Athletics	4	2	2	8
Cycling	3	4	4	11
Fencing	2	3	9	14
Gymnastics	4	10	3	17
Judo	6	2	5	13
Karate	2	0	1	3
Kickboxing	2	7	12	21
Swimming	2	5	5	12
Para athletics	1	0	0	1
Para swimming	2	2	1	5
Table tennis	0	0	1	1
Taekwondo	4	0	4	8
Weightlifting	15	3	6	24
Wrestling	4	4	10	18
Total	51	42	65	158

== Basketball ==
=== Women's 3x3 tournament ===
Group B

Pos	Team	Pld	W	L	PF	PA	PD	Qualification
1	Mali	2	2	0	42	20	+22	Quarterfinals
2	Uzbekistan	2	1	1	25	30	−5	Quarterfinals
3	Uganda	2	0	2	17	34	−17	9–12th place semifinals

Source: Konya 2021
Rules for classification: 1) Wins; 2) Head-to-head record; 3) Points scored.

15 August

Report

Uzbekistan	13–20	Mali

Karatay Congress and Sport Center Konya

15 August

Report

Uzbekistan	12–10	Uganda

Karatay Congress and Sport Center Konya

== Handball ==
=== Women's tournament ===
Group A

Pos	Team	Pld	W	D	L	GF	GA	GD	Pts	Qualification
1	Turkey (H)	3	3	0	0	127	62	+65	6	Semifinals
2	Uzbekistan	3	2	0	1	99	89	+10	4	Semifinals
3	Senegal	3	1	0	2	95	87	+8	2	Fifth place game
4	Bangladesh	3	0	0	3	55	138	−83	0	Seventh place game

Rules for classification: 1) Points; 2) Head-to-head points; 3) Head-to-head goal difference; 4) Head-to-head goals scored; 5) Goal difference; 6) Goals scored; 7) Draw.
(H) Hosts

7 August 2022; 11:00	Senegal	27–28	Uzbekistan	Selçuklu Municipality International Sports Hall, Selçuklu

9 August 2022; 13:00	Uzbekistan	42–20	Bangladesh	Selçuklu Municipality International Sports Hall, Selçuklu

11 August 2022; 13:00	Turkey	42–29	Uzbekistan	Selçuklu Municipality International Sports Hall, Selçuklu
11 August 2022; 13:00		(23–14)		Selçuklu Municipality International Sports Hall, Selçuklu

Semifinal

13 August 2022; 13:00	Azerbaijan	40–27	Uzbekistan	Selçuklu Municipality International Sports Hall, Selçuklu
13 August 2022; 13:00		(19–13)		Selçuklu Municipality International Sports Hall, Selçuklu

Bronze medal match

14 August 2022; 13:00	Cameroon	40–27	Uzbekistan	Selçuklu Municipality International Sports Hall, Selçuklu

== Judo ==
Men

Athlete	Event	Round of 32	Round of 16	Quarterfinals	Semifinals	Repechage	Final / BM	
Athlete	Event	Opposition Result	Opposition Result	Opposition Result	Opposition Result	Opposition Result	Opposition Result	Rank
Kemran Nurillaev	60 kg	—N/a	Lopes (GBS); W	Omirov (TKM); W	Dhouibi (TUN); W	—N/a	Agayev (AZE); L	2nd place, silver medalist(s)
Sardor Nurillaev	66 kg	—N/a	Bye	Shayakhmetov (KAZ); W	Kodzhakov (BHR); W	—N/a	Boushita (MAR); W	1st place, gold medalist(s)
Shakhram Akhadov	73 kg	Bye	Moussa (LBN); W	Valiyev (AZE); W	Demirel (TUR); W	—N/a	Mirzayev (AZE); W	1st place, gold medalist(s)
Sharofiddin Boltaboev	81 kg	Bye	Açyldyýew (TKM); W	Rizoev (TJK); L	—N/a	Moutii (MAR); W	Tchgayev (AZE); W	3rd place, bronze medalist(s)
Davlat Bobonov	90 kg	Bye	Missin (KAZ); W	Grigorian (UAE); L	—N/a	Madzhidov (TJK); W	Sagaipov (LBN); W	3rd place, bronze medalist(s)
Muzaffarbek Turoboyev	−100 kg	—N/a	Bye	Mamazairov (KGZ); W	Abubakri (TJK); W	—N/a	Gasimov (AZE); W	1st place, gold medalist(s)
Alisher Yusupov	+100 kg	—N/a	Bye	Yusifov (AZE); W	Chotchaev (BHR); W	—N/a	Magomedomarov (UAE); L	2nd place, silver medalist(s)

Women

Athlete	Event	Round of 16	Quarterfinals	Semifinals	Repechage	Final / BM	
Athlete	Event	Opposition Result	Opposition Result	Opposition Result	Opposition Result	Opposition Result	Rank
Diyora Keldiyorova	52 kg	Muminova (TJK); W	Segue (CHA); W	Kadamboeva (UZB); W	—N/a	Iraoui (MAR); W	1st place, gold medalist(s)
Sita Kadamboeva	52 kg	Omirova (TKM); W	Koçyiğit (TUR); W	Keldiyorova (UZB); L	—N/a	Rozyýewa (TKM); W	3rd place, bronze medalist(s)
Nilufar Ermaganbetova	57 kg	Zholdosheva (KGZ); W	Korkmaz (TUR); W	Dabonne (CIV); W	—N/a	Iraoui (MAR); W	1st place, gold medalist(s)
Sevinch Isokova	63 kg	Bye	Dashkinova (TKM); W	Belkadi (ALG); L	—N/a	Faye (SEN); W	3rd place, bronze medalist(s)
Gulnoza Matniyazova	70 kg	—N/a	Hasanli (AZE); W	Barbat (IRI); W	—N/a	Landolsi (TUN); W	1st place, gold medalist(s)
Shokhista Nazarova	70 kg	Gilaniasl (IRI); W	Akdeniz (TUR); L	—N/a	Hasanli (AZE); W	Barbat (IRI); W	3rd place, bronze medalist(s)
Shirinjon Yuldoshova	78 kg	—N/a	Yılmaz (TUR); L	—N/a	Yatim (MAR); L	—N/a	5

== Volleyball ==
=== Women's tournament ===
Pos	Team	Pld	W	L	Pts	SW	SL	SR	SPW	SPL	SPR	Qualification
1	Turkey (H)	2	2	0	6	6	0	MAX	150	83	1.807	Semifinals
2	Iran	2	1	1	3	3	4	0.750	153	150	1.020	Semifinals
3	Uzbekistan	2	0	2	0	1	6	0.167	106	176	0.602	

Source: TVF
(H) Host

Date	Time		Score		Set 1	Set 2	Set 3	Set 4	Set 5	Total	Report
8 Aug	19:00	Turkey	3–0	Uzbekistan	25–13	25–3	25–15			75–31	Report
10 Aug	16:00	Uzbekistan	1–3	Iran	15–25	16–25	28–26	16–25		75–101	Report

== Wrestling ==
Men's freestyle

Athlete	Event	Round of 16	Quarterfinal	Semifinal	Repesaj	Final / BM	
Athlete	Event	Opposition Result	Opposition Result	Opposition Result	Opposition Result	Opposition Result	Rank
Gulomjon Abdullaev	57 kg	Bye	Almaktari (YEM); W 12-2	Kalzhan (KAZ); W 3-2	—N/a	Smanbekov (KGZ); W 10-0	1st place, gold medalist(s)
Jahongirmirza Turobov	61 kg	Topal (TUR); W 3-2	Alibegov (BHR); W 15-11	Aburumaila (PLE); W 11-0	—N/a	Bazarganov (AZE); W 6-6	1st place, gold medalist(s)
Umidjon Jalolov	65 kg	Bye	Khadzhimurodov (KGZ); W 5-1	Aliyev (AZE); L 0-4	—N/a	Ghiasi (IRI); L 2-4	5
Zafarbek Otakhonov	70 kg	Bye	Budak (TUR); W 6-3	Abozari (IRI); L 0-3	—N/a	N`Dum (GBS); L 7-7	5
Ikhtiyor Navruzov	74 kg	Alrabedhi (YEM); W 10-0	Bayramov (AZE); L 0-8	—N/a		Abdelkader (ALG); W 10-4	3rd place, bronze medalist(s)
Bekzod Abdurakhmonov	79 kg	Razib (BAN); W 10-0	Ait-Boulahri (MAR); W 10-0	Akdeniz (TUR); L 6-6	—N/a	Eddine (ALG); W 10-0	3rd place, bronze medalist(s)
Azizbek Fayzullaev	86 kg	—N/a	Abakarov (AZE); L 0-10	—N/a		Göçen (TUR); L 6-11	5
Bobur Islomov	92 kg	—N/a	Yaylacı (TUR); L 0-10	—N/a		Chynybekov (KGZ); W 5-4	3rd place, bronze medalist(s)
Magomed Ibragimov	97 kg	Ahmadi (AFG); W 3-0	Butt (PAK); W 10-0	Sessiz (TUR); L 5-5	—N/a	Hemelýaýew (PAK); W 2-2	3rd place, bronze medalist(s)

Athlete	Event	Group Stage				Semifinal	Final / BM	
Athlete	Event	Opposition Result	Opposition Result	Opposition Result	Rank	Opposition Result	Opposition Result	Rank
Khasanboy Rakhimov	125 kg	Hashemi (IRI); L 4-5	Hamidli (AZE); W 6-0	Turdubekov (KGZ); W 1-1	2 Q	Ercan (TUR); L 4-14	Saparow (TKM); W 10-0	3rd place, bronze medalist(s)

Men's Greco-Roman

Athlete	Event	Round of 16	Quarterfinal	Semifinal	Repesaj	Final / BM	
Athlete	Event	Opposition Result	Opposition Result	Opposition Result	Opposition Result	Opposition Result	Rank
Jasurbek Ortikboev	55 kg	—N/a	Azizov (TJK); W 4-3	Panahisani (IRI); W 9-0	—N/a	Azizli (AZE); L 1-10	2nd place, silver medalist(s)
Mukhammadkodir Yusupov	60 kg	Bye	Sharshenbekov (KGZ); L 0-9	—N/a		Arami (IRI); W 8-1	3rd place, bronze medalist(s)
Turabek Tirkashev	63 kg	Bye	Mammadov (AZE); W 11-0	Beheshtitala (IRI); L 3-4	—N/a	Mirzorajabov (TJK); L 1-6	DSQ
Abror Atabaev	67 kg	Ghaiou (ALG); W 7-3	Çakıl (TUR); W 7-5	Ismailov (KGZ); L 0-9	—N/a	Bahja (MAR); W 9-0	3rd place, bronze medalist(s)
Mirzobek Rakhmatov	72 kg	—N/a	Barnawi (KSA); W 9-1	Rostami (IRI); L 4-7	—N/a	Ochilov (TJK); W 9-0	3rd place, bronze medalist(s)
Aram Vardanyan	77 kg	Bye	Boualem (MAR); W 9-0	Makhmudov (KGZ); L 5-7	—N/a	Bayrak (TUR); L 0-9	5
Mukhammadkodir Rasulov	82 kg	Garmsiri (IRI); W 5-2	Asykeev (KGZ); L 0-6	—N/a		Eid (JOR); W 9-0	3rd place, bronze medalist(s)
Rustam Assakalov	97 kg	Bye	Safarov (TJK); W 9-0	Kayışdağ (TUR); W 2-1	—N/a	Dzhuzupbekov (KGZ); W 3-1	1st place, gold medalist(s)

Athlete	Event	Group Stage				Semifinal	Final / BM	
Athlete	Event	Opposition Result	Opposition Result	Opposition Result	Rank	Opposition Result	Opposition Result	Rank
Jalgasbay Berdimuratov	87 kg	Taheri (IRI); W 11-2	Küçükosman (TUR); W 4-4	Öwelekow (TKM); W 10-0	1 Q	Ahmadiyev (AZE); W 8-0	Taheri (IRI); W 11-2	1st place, gold medalist(s)
Muminjon Abdullaev	130 kg	Shariati (AZE); L 1-4	Savenko (KAZ); L 3-5	—N/a	3	did not advance		5

Women's freestyle

Athlete	Event	Round of 16	Quarterfinal	Semifinal	Repesaj	Final / BM	
Athlete	Event	Opposition Result	Opposition Result	Opposition Result	Opposition Result	Opposition Result	Rank
Aktenge Keunimjaeva	53 kg	—N/a	Makhyaddinova (KAZ); W 8-5	Shakarshoeva (TJK); W 5-0	—N/a	Gurbanova (AZE); L 1-6	2nd place, silver medalist(s)
Nabira Esenbaeva	62 kg	—N/a	Omelchenko (AZE); L 1-12	did not advance			7
Svetlana Oknazarova	72 kg	Bye	Ngiri (CMR); L 4-4	did not advance			8

Nordic Format

Athlete	Event	Nordic Round Robin				Rank
Athlete	Event	Opposition Result	Opposition Result	Opposition Result	Opposition Result	Rank
Shokhida Akhmedova	55 kg	—N/a	Mammadova (AZE); W 6–5	Hammami (TUN); W 11–0	Yetgil (TUR); L 1-3	2nd place, silver medalist(s)
Dilfuza Aimbetova	59 kg	Adekuoroye (NGR); L 0–10	Bekesh (KAZ); W 5–0	Kolesnik (AZE); L 3–10	Çelik (TUR); L 2–5	3rd place, bronze medalist(s)

Group Stage Format

Athlete	Event	Group Stage				Semifinal	Final / BM	
Athlete	Event	Opposition Result	Opposition Result	Opposition Result	Rank	Opposition Result	Opposition Result	Rank
Svetlana Ankicheva	50 kg	—N/a	Çataloğlu (TUR); W 4–1	Stadnik (AZE); L 0–10	2 Q	Immaeva (UZB); L 0–7	Hamdi (TUN); L 1–5	4
Laylokhon Sobirova	57 kg	—N/a	Aliyeva (AZE); L 0–4	Almaganbetova (KAZ); L 1–4	3	did not advance		6
Ariukhan Jumabaeva	65 kg	—N/a	Manolova (AZE); L 0–5	Shalygina (KAZ); L 2–6	3	did not advance		5
Azoda Esbergenova	68 kg	Demir (TUR); L 0–5	Zhumanazarova (KGZ); L 4–8	Akter (BAN); W 10–0	3	did not advance		5
Ozoda Zaripboeva	76 kg	—N/a	Zhanatayeva (KAZ); L 0–7	Gültekin (TUR); L 1–5	3	did not advance		6

== Weightlifting ==
Men

Athlete	Event	Snatch		Clean & Jerk		Total	Rank
Athlete	Event	Result	Rank	Result	Rank	Total	Rank
Adkhamjon Ergashev	-67kg	141	1st place, gold medalist(s)	173	2nd place, silver medalist(s)	314	1st place, gold medalist(s)
Doston Yokubov	-67kg	134	5	171	4	305	2nd place, silver medalist(s)
Mukhammadkodir Toshtemirov	-81kg	164	1st place, gold medalist(s)	190	4	354	3rd place, bronze medalist(s)
Sarvarbek Zafarjonov	-89kg	167	1st place, gold medalist(s)	199	1st place, gold medalist(s)	366	1st place, gold medalist(s)
Sunnatilla Usarov	-96kg	164	3rd place, bronze medalist(s)	190	3rd place, bronze medalist(s)	354	2nd place, silver medalist(s)
Sharofiddin Amriddinov	-102kg	172	3rd place, bronze medalist(s)	198	7	370	6
Ruslan Nurudinov	-109kg	187	1st place, gold medalist(s)	230	1st place, gold medalist(s)	417	1st place, gold medalist(s)
Akbar Djuraev	+109kg	200	1st place, gold medalist(s)	246	1st place, gold medalist(s)	446	1st place, gold medalist(s)

Women

Athlete	Event	Snatch		Clean & Jerk		Total	Rank
Athlete	Event	Result	Rank	Result	Rank	Total	Rank
Nigora Suvonova	-76kg	93	3rd place, bronze medalist(s)	112	4	205	4
Rigina Adashbaeva	-81kg	99	3rd place, bronze medalist(s)	121	4	220	4
Tursunoy Jabborova	-87kg	109	1st place, gold medalist(s)	126	1st place, gold medalist(s)	235	1st place, gold medalist(s)
