= 2023 World Wrestling Championships – Men's freestyle 61 kg =

World Wrestling competitions

Men's freestyle 61 kg at the 2023 World Championships
- Venue: Štark Arena
- Dates: 16–17 September 2023
- Competitors: 27 from 24 nations

Medalists
gold medal	Vito Arujau	United States
silver medal	Abasgadzhi Magomedov
bronze medal	Taiyrbek Zhumashbek Uulu	Kyrgyzstan
bronze medal	Shota Phartenadze	Georgia

The men's freestyle 61 kilograms is a competition featured at the 2023 World Wrestling Championships, and was held in Belgrade, Serbia on 16 and 17 September 2023.

This freestyle wrestling competition consists of a single-elimination tournament, with a repechage used to determine the winner of two bronze medals. The two finalists face off for gold and silver medals. Each wrestler who loses to one of the two finalists moves into the repechage, culminating in a pair of bronze medal matches featuring the semifinal losers each facing the remaining repechage opponent from their half of the bracket.

== Results ==
Legend

- F — Won by fall
- WO — Won by walkover

=== Final ===
Final
Vito Arujau (USA)	10
Abasgadzhi Magomedov (AIN)	9

=== Top half ===
Round of 32
Kodai Ogawa (JPN)	10
Daniel Popov (ISR)	0
Stilyan Iliev (BUL)	6
Nils Leutert (SUI)	2
Ossimzhan Dastanbek (KAZ)	0
Vito Arujau (USA)	10
Joey Silva (PUR)	3
Besir Alili (MKD)	2
Song Hyeon-sik (KOR)	2
Intigam Valizada (AZE)	5

Round of 16
Reza Atri (IRI)	1
Kodai Ogawa (JPN)	1
Stilyan Iliev (BUL)	0
Vito Arujau (USA)	10
Emrah Ormanoğlu (TUR)	8
Joey Silva (PUR)	0
Intigam Valizada (AZE)	0
Taiyrbek Zhumashbek Uulu (KGZ)	5^{F}

Quarterfinals
Kodai Ogawa (JPN)	2
Vito Arujau (USA)	8
Emrah Ormanoğlu (TUR)	2
Taiyrbek Zhumashbek Uulu (KGZ)	4

Semifinals
Vito Arujau (USA)	12
Taiyrbek Zhumashbek Uulu (KGZ)	2

=== Bottom half ===
Round of 32
Norik Harutyunyan (ARM)	0
Andrei Bekreneu (AIN)	5
Leonid Colesnic (MDA)	5
Akash Dahiya (UWW)	10
~~Nick Lattanze (CAN)~~
Jahongirmirza Turobov (UZB)	WO
Nikolay Okhlopkov (ROU)	0
Abasgadzhi Magomedov (AIN)	10
Li Weiyu (CHN)	11
Abdelhak Kherbache (ALG)	0
Kenneth Koech (KEN)	0
Valentyn Bliasetskyi (UKR)	10

Round of 16
Shota Phartenadze (GEO)	5
Andrei Bekreneu (AIN)	0
Akash Dahiya (UWW)	4
Jahongirmirza Turobov (UZB)	7^{F}
Abasgadzhi Magomedov (AIN)	12
Li Weiyu (CHN)	0
Valentyn Bliasetskyi (UKR)	12
Narmandakhyn Narankhüü (MGL)	8

Quarterfinals
Shota Phartenadze (GEO)	5
Jahongirmirza Turobov (UZB)	3
Abasgadzhi Magomedov (AIN)	16^{F}
Valentyn Bliasetskyi (UKR)	4

Semifinals
Shota Phartenadze (GEO)	0
Abasgadzhi Magomedov (AIN)	10

=== Repechage ===
Repechage round 1
Ossimzhan Dastanbek (KAZ)	10
Stilyan Iliev (BUL)	0
Nikolay Okhlopkov (ROU)	0
Li Weiyu (CHN)	11

Repechage round 2
Ossimzhan Dastanbek (KAZ)	3
Kodai Ogawa (JPN)	3
Li Weiyu (CHN)	0
Valentyn Bliasetskyi (UKR)	4^{F}

Bronze medals
Kodai Ogawa (JPN)	1
Taiyrbek Zhumashbek Uulu (KGZ)	2
Valentyn Bliasetskyi (UKR)	5
Shota Phartenadze (GEO)	5

== Final standing ==
Rank	Athlete
1st place, gold medalist(s)	Vito Arujau (USA)
2nd place, silver medalist(s)	Abasgadzhi Magomedov (AIN)
3rd place, bronze medalist(s)	Taiyrbek Zhumashbek Uulu (KGZ)
3rd place, bronze medalist(s)	Shota Phartenadze (GEO)
5	Kodai Ogawa (JPN)
5	Valentyn Bliasetskyi (UKR)
7	Jahongirmirza Turobov (UZB)
8	Li Weiyu (CHN)
9	Ossimzhan Dastanbek (KAZ)
10	Emrah Ormanoğlu (TUR)
11	Akash Dahiya (UWW)
12	Stilyan Iliev (BUL)
13	Andrei Bekreneu (AIN)
14	Intigam Valizada (AZE)
15	Joey Silva (PUR)
16	Narmandakhyn Narankhüü (MGL)
17	Leonid Colesnic (MDA)
18	Besir Alili (MKD)
19	Song Hyeon-sik (KOR)
20	Nils Leutert (SUI)
21	Reza Atri (IRI)
22	Norik Harutyunyan (ARM)
23	Daniel Popov (ISR)
24	Kenneth Koech (KEN)
25	Abdelhak Kherbache (ALG)
26	Nikolay Okhlopkov (ROU)
—	Nick Lattanze (CAN)
