= Wrestling at the 2021 Islamic Solidarity Games – Results =

These are the results of the Wrestling at the 2021 Islamic Solidarity Games which took place between 10 and 13 August 2022 in Konya, Turkey.

== Men's freestyle ==
=== 57 kg ===
10 August

Round of 16
Rakhat Kalzhan (KAZ)	10
Fasher Jafar Maky (SUD)	0
Almaz Smanbekov (KGZ)	13^{F}
Aliabbas Rzazade (AZE)	4

Quarterfinals
Şaban Kızıltaş (TUR)	3
Rakhat Kalzhan (KAZ)	9
Gulomjon Abdullaev (UZB)	12
Aseel Al-Maktari (YEM)	2
Reza Momeni (IRI)	4
Hikmatullo Vohidov (TJK)	6
Almaz Smanbekov (KGZ)	10
Omar Faye (SEN)	0

Semifinals
Rakhat Kalzhan (KAZ)	2
Gulomjon Abdullaev (UZB)	3
Hikmatullo Vohidov (TJK)	2
Almaz Smanbekov (KGZ)	13

Final
Gulomjon Abdullaev (UZB)	10
Almaz Smanbekov (KGZ)	0

Repechage round 1
Aliabbas Rzazade (AZE)	4^{F}
Omar Faye (SEN)	2

Bronze medals
Aseel Al-Maktari (YEM)	0
Rakhat Kalzhan (KAZ)	10
Aliabbas Rzazade (AZE)	8
Hikmatullo Vohidov (TJK)	7

=== 61 kg ===
11 August

Round of 16
Recep Topal (TUR)	2
Jahongirmirza Turobov (UZB)	3
Didier Diatta (SEN)	0
Majid Dastan (IRI)	10
Islam Bazarganov (AZE)	10
Sayed Mohammad Naseri (AFG)	0

Quarterfinals
Alibeg Alibegov (BRN)	11
Jahongirmirza Turobov (UZB)	15
Ali Aburumaila (PLE)	15
Abdelhak Kherbache (ALG)	5
Bekbolot Myrzanazar Uulu (KGZ)	4
Majid Dastan (IRI)	9
Islam Bazarganov (AZE)	3
Muhammad Bilal (PAK)	0

Semifinals
Jahongirmirza Turobov (UZB)	11
Ali Aburumaila (PLE)	0
Majid Dastan (IRI)	0
Islam Bazarganov (AZE)	10

Final
Jahongirmirza Turobov (UZB)	6
Islam Bazarganov (AZE)	6

Repechage round 1
Recep Topal (TUR)	3
Alibeg Alibegov (BRN)	1
Sayed Mohammad Naseri (AFG)	0
Muhammad Bilal (PAK)	11

Bronze medals
Recep Topal (TUR)	11
Ali Aburumaila (PLE)	3
Muhammad Bilal (PAK)	3
Majid Dastan (IRI)	6

=== 65 kg ===
10 August

Round of 16
Morteza Ghiasi (IRI)	6
Hamza Alaca (TUR)	2
Kerim Hojakow (TKM)	11
Saddam Al-Hada (YEM)	0

Quarterfinals
Haji Aliyev (AZE)	8
Morteza Ghiasi (IRI)	4
Ikromzhon Khadzhimurodov (KGZ)	1
Umidjon Jalolov (UZB)	5
Adlan Askarov (KAZ)	0
Zelimkhan Abakarov (ALB)	10
Kerim Hojakow (TKM)	6
Othmane El-Bahja (MAR)	0

Semifinals
Haji Aliyev (AZE)	4
Umidjon Jalolov (UZB)	0
Zelimkhan Abakarov (ALB)	10
Kerim Hojakow (TKM)	0

Final
Haji Aliyev (AZE)	4^{F}
Zelimkhan Abakarov (ALB)	0

Bronze medals
Morteza Ghiasi (IRI)	4
Umidjon Jalolov (UZB)	2
Adlan Askarov (KAZ)	8
Kerim Hojakow (TKM)	0

=== 70 kg ===
11 August

Round of 16
Mekan Orazow (TKM)	2
Ernazar Akmataliev (KGZ)	12
Christian Guidilim (CMR)	0
Asgar Mammadaliyev (AZE)	10
Islam Dudaev (ALB)	10
Inayat Ullah (PAK)	0
Samuel Falaina (CHA)	0
Cüneyt Budak (TUR)	10
Abdul Jamal Spartan (UGA)	0
Hossein Abouzari (IRI)	7^{F}

Quarterfinals
Dzhamshed Sharifov (TJK)	0
Ernazar Akmataliev (KGZ)	11
Asgar Mammadaliyev (AZE)	5
Islam Dudaev (ALB)	4
Zafarbek Otakhonov (UZB)	6
Cüneyt Budak (TUR)	3
Hossein Abouzari (IRI)	10
Bacar Ndum (GBS)	0

Semifinals
Ernazar Akmataliev (KGZ)	12
Asgar Mammadaliyev (AZE)	1
Zafarbek Otakhonov (UZB)	0
Hossein Abouzari (IRI)	3

Final
Ernazar Akmataliev (KGZ)	6
Hossein Abouzari (IRI)	0

Repechage round 1
Mekan Orazow (TKM)	0
Dzhamshed Sharifov (TJK)	7
Abdul Jamal Spartan (UGA)	0
Bacar Ndum (GBS)	10^{F}

Bronze medals
Dzhamshed Sharifov (TJK)	0
Asgar Mammadaliyev (AZE)	3
Bacar Ndum (GBS)	7
Zafarbek Otakhonov (UZB)	7

=== 74 kg ===
10 August

Round of 16
Mamadou Diouf (SEN)	0
Atamyrat Çarlyýew (TKM)	4^{F}
Ikhtiyor Navruzov (UZB)	10
Abdulkareem Al-Rabedhi (YEM)	0
Nurkozha Kaipanov (KAZ)	5
Adilet Zhaparkulov (KGZ)	0
Mohammad Sadegh Firouzpour (IRI)	9
Fazlı Eryılmaz (TUR)	6

Quarterfinals
Abdelkader Ikkal (ALG)	8
Atamyrat Çarlyýew (TKM)	2
Ikhtiyor Navruzov (UZB)	0
Turan Bayramov (AZE)	8
Gulomdzhon Sharipov (TJK)	0
Nurkozha Kaipanov (KAZ)	11
Mohammad Sadegh Firouzpour (IRI)	13
Erzo Isakov (JOR)	4

Semifinals
Abdelkader Ikkal (ALG)	0
Turan Bayramov (AZE)	11
Nurkozha Kaipanov (KAZ)	2
Mohammad Sadegh Firouzpour (IRI)	3

Final
Turan Bayramov (AZE)	2
Mohammad Sadegh Firouzpour (IRI)	1

Repechage round 1
Fazlı Eryılmaz (TUR)	11
Erzo Isakov (JOR)	7

Bronze medals
Ikhtiyor Navruzov (UZB)	10
Abdelkader Ikkal (ALG)	4
Fazlı Eryılmaz (TUR)	8
Nurkozha Kaipanov (KAZ)	7

=== 79 kg ===
11 August

Round of 16
Muhammet Akdeniz (TUR)	10
Chemseddine Fetairia (ALG)	0
Muhammad Asad Butt (PAK)	10
Youssef Aït Boulahri (MAR)	0
Md Al Razib (BAN)	0
Bekzod Abdurakhmonov (UZB)	10
Ivan Masakwe (UGA)	0
Ali Savadkouhi (IRI)	11^{F}
Arsalan Budazhapov (KGZ)	10
Somonjon Ikromov (TJK)	0

Quarterfinals
Malik Daghash (PLE)	0
Muhammet Akdeniz (TUR)	9^{F}
Muhammad Asad Butt (PAK)	0
Bekzod Abdurakhmonov (UZB)	10
Meiir Koshkinbayev (KAZ)	1
Ali Savadkouhi (IRI)	3
Arsalan Budazhapov (KGZ)	4
Gadzhimurad Omarov (AZE)	4

Semifinals
Muhammet Akdeniz (TUR)	6
Bekzod Abdurakhmonov (UZB)	6
Ali Savadkouhi (IRI)	7
Gadzhimurad Omarov (AZE)	0

Final
Muhammet Akdeniz (TUR)	6
Ali Savadkouhi (IRI)	12

Repechage round 1
Chemseddine Fetairia (ALG)	10
Malik Daghash (PLE)	0
Ivan Masakwe (UGA)	0
Meiir Koshkinbayev (KAZ)	10

Bronze medals
Chemseddine Fetairia (ALG)	0
Bekzod Abdurakhmonov (UZB)	10
Meiir Koshkinbayev (KAZ)	4
Gadzhimurad Omarov (AZE)	10

=== 86 kg ===
10 August

Quarterfinals		Semifinals		Final
Osman Göçen (TUR)	3
Döwletmyrat Orazgylyjow (TKM)	2	Osman Göçen (TUR)	6
Azizbek Fayzullaev (UZB)	0	Abubakr Abakarov (AZE)	7
Abubakr Abakarov (AZE)	11			Abubakr Abakarov (AZE)	0^{R}
Saleh Bouba Haraïna (CHA)	0			Alireza Karimi (IRI)	9
Fateh Benferdjallah (ALG)	4^{F}	Fateh Benferdjallah (ALG)	0
Nurtilek Karypbaev (KGZ)	0	Alireza Karimi (IRI)	10
Alireza Karimi (IRI)	10

Bronze medals
Azizbek Fayzullaev (UZB)	6
Osman Göçen (TUR)	11
Nurtilek Karypbaev (KGZ)	3
Fateh Benferdjallah (ALG)	3

=== 92 kg ===
11 August

Quarterfinals		Semifinals		Final
Erhan Yaylacı (TUR)	10
Bobur Islomov (UZB)	0	Erhan Yaylacı (TUR)	6
Mirlan Chynybekov (KGZ)	4^{F}	Mirlan Chynybekov (KGZ)	0
Muhammad Nouman (PAK)	0			Erhan Yaylacı (TUR)	1
Ahmad Bazri (IRI)	13			Ahmad Bazri (IRI)	7
Abdimanap Baigenzheyev (KAZ)	2	Ahmad Bazri (IRI)	6
Osman Nurmagomedov (AZE)	10	Osman Nurmagomedov (AZE)	6
Imed Kaddidi (TUN)	0

Bronze medals
Bobur Islomov (UZB)	5
Mirlan Chynybekov (KGZ)	4
Abdimanap Baigenzheyev (KAZ)	0
Osman Nurmagomedov (AZE)	10

=== 97 kg ===
10 August

Round of 16
Magomed Ibragimov (UZB)	3
Noor Ahmad Ahmadi (AFG)	0
Baisal Kubatov (KGZ)	0
Mojtaba Goleij (IRI)	10

Quarterfinals
Haider Ali Butt (PAK)	0
Magomed Ibragimov (UZB)	10
Şatlyk Hemelýäýew (TKM)	1
Mustafa Sessiz (TUR)	8
Islam Ilyasov (AZE)	1
Mamed Ibragimov (KAZ)	3
Mojtaba Goleij (IRI)	10
Rahmonjon Mahmadbekov (TJK)	0

Semifinals
Magomed Ibragimov (UZB)	5
Mustafa Sessiz (TUR)	5
Mamed Ibragimov (KAZ)	2
Mojtaba Goleij (IRI)	13

Final
Mustafa Sessiz (TUR)	0^{R}
Mojtaba Goleij (IRI)	2

Repechage round 1
Baisal Kubatov (KGZ)	3
Rahmonjon Mahmadbekov (TJK)	3

Bronze medals
Şatlyk Hemelýäýew (TKM)	2
Magomed Ibragimov (UZB)	2
Baisal Kubatov (KGZ)	0
Mamed Ibragimov (KAZ)	11

=== 125 kg ===
11 August

Pos	Athlete	Pld	W	L	CP	TP	IRI	UZB	AZE	KGZ
1	Mehdi Hashemi (IRI)	3	3	0	10	24	—	5–4	9–0	10–0
2	Khasanboy Rakhimov (UZB)	3	2	1	9	11	1–3 PO1	—	6–0 Fall	1–1
3	Rahid Hamidli (AZE)	3	1	2	3	3	0–3 PO	0–5 FA	—	3–1
4	Arslanbek Turdubekov (KGZ)	3	0	3	2	2	0–4 SU	1–3 PO1	1–3 PO1	—

Source: UWW

Pos	Athlete	Pld	W	L	CP	TP	TUR	TKM	QAT
1	Salim Ercan (TUR)	2	2	0	9	11	—	11–1	WO
2	Zyýamuhammet Saparow (TKM)	2	1	1	6	11	1–4 SU1	—	10–0 Fall
3	Jassim Abdulrahman (QAT)	2	0	2	0	0	0–5 IN	0–5 FA	—

Source: UWW

Semifinals
Mehdi Hashemi (IRI)	11
Zyýamuhammet Saparow (TKM)	0
Salim Ercan (TUR)	14
Khasanboy Rakhimov (UZB)	4

Final
Mehdi Hashemi (IRI)	8
Salim Ercan (TUR)	0
Bronze medal
Zyýamuhammet Saparow (TKM)	0
Khasanboy Rakhimov (UZB)	10

== Men's Greco-Roman ==
=== 55 kg ===
12 August

Quarterfinals		Semifinals		Final
Mohammad Hosseinvand (IRI)	7
Adem Uzun (TUR)	0	Mohammad Hosseinvand (IRI)	0
Aslamjon Azizov (TJK)	3	Jasurbek Ortikboev (UZB)	9
Jasurbek Ortikboev (UZB)	4			Jasurbek Ortikboev (UZB)	1
Ulan Muratbek Uulu (KGZ)	4			Eldaniz Azizli (AZE)	10
Amangali Bekbolatov (KAZ)	13	Amangali Bekbolatov (KAZ)	1
Eldaniz Azizli (AZE)	8	Eldaniz Azizli (AZE)	3
Umit Durdyýew (TKM)	0

Bronze medals
Aslamjon Azizov (TJK)	8
Mohammad Hosseinvand (IRI)	0
Umit Durdyýew (TKM)	0
Amangali Bekbolatov (KAZ)	8

=== 60 kg ===
13 August

Round of 16
Abdelkarim Fergat (ALG)	8
Rayan Hawsawi (KSA)	0

Quarterfinals
Ayhan Karakuş (TUR)	5
Abdelkarim Fergat (ALG)	3
Yernur Fidakhmetov (KAZ)	1
Murad Mammadov (AZE)	4
Zholaman Sharshenbekov (KGZ)	9
Mukhammadkodir Yusupov (UZB)	0
Omid Arami (IRI)	8
Fouad Fajari (MAR)	0

Semifinals
Ayhan Karakuş (TUR)	7
Murad Mammadov (AZE)	10
Zholaman Sharshenbekov (KGZ)	5
Omid Arami (IRI)	1

Final
Murad Mammadov (AZE)	2
Zholaman Sharshenbekov (KGZ)	10

Bronze medals
Yernur Fidakhmetov (KAZ)	2
Ayhan Karakuş (TUR)	6
Mukhammadkodir Yusupov (UZB)	8
Omid Arami (IRI)	1

=== 63 kg ===
12 August

Round of 16
Taleh Mammadov (AZE)	11
Mesfer Al-Subaie (KSA)	0

Quarterfinals
Turabek Tirkashev (UZB)	11
Taleh Mammadov (AZE)	0
Shirzad Beheshti (IRI)	3
Firuz Mirzoradzhabov (TJK)	1
Abdeldjebar Djebbari (ALG)	1
Tynar Sharshenbekov (KGZ)	9
Azatjan Açilow (TKM)	4
Abdurrahman Altan (TUR)	1

Semifinals
Turabek Tirkashev (UZB)	3
Shirzad Beheshti (IRI)	4
Tynar Sharshenbekov (KGZ)	8
Azatjan Açilow (TKM)	6

Final
Shirzad Beheshti (IRI)	4
Tynar Sharshenbekov (KGZ)	2

Bronze medals
Firuz Mirzoradzhabov (TJK)	6
Turabek Tirkashev (UZB)	1^{DQ}
Abdeldjebar Djebbari (ALG)	3
Azatjan Açilow (TKM)	6

=== 67 kg ===
13 August

Round of 16
Ishak Ghaiou (ALG)	3
Abror Atabaev (UZB)	7

Quarterfinals
Volkan Çakıl (TUR)	5
Abror Atabaev (UZB)	7
Bilal El-Bahja (MAR)	0
Amantur Ismailov (KGZ)	9
Begmyrat Nobatow (TKM)	5
Ahmed Barahmah (KSA)	1
Hasrat Jafarov (AZE)	10
Mohammad Javad Rezaei (IRI)	3

Semifinals
Abror Atabaev (UZB)	0
Amantur Ismailov (KGZ)	9
Begmyrat Nobatow (TKM)	1
Hasrat Jafarov (AZE)	9

Final
Amantur Ismailov (KGZ)	1
Hasrat Jafarov (AZE)	3

Bronze medals
Bilal El-Bahja (MAR)	0
Abror Atabaev (UZB)	9
Mohammad Javad Rezaei (IRI)	11
Begmyrat Nobatow (TKM)	0

=== 72 kg ===
12 August

Quarterfinals		Semifinals		Final
Mirzobek Rakhmatov (UZB)	9
Hassan Barnawi (KSA)	1	Mirzobek Rakhmatov (UZB)	4
Mohammad Reza Rostami (IRI)	9	Mohammad Reza Rostami (IRI)	7
Sheroz Ochilov (TJK)	0			Mohammad Reza Rostami (IRI)	9
Gul Khan Noori (AFG)	0			Ulvu Ganizade (AZE)	8
Bek Konurbaev (KGZ)	8	Bek Konurbaev (KGZ)	0
Ulvu Ganizade (AZE)	10	Ulvu Ganizade (AZE)	9
Murat Dağ (TUR)	1

Bronze medals
Sheroz Ochilov (TJK)	0
Mirzobek Rakhmatov (UZB)	9
Murat Dağ (TUR)	5
Bek Konurbaev (KGZ)	1

=== 77 kg ===
13 August

Round of 16
Furkan Bayrak (TUR)	8
Ammar Hawsawi (KSA)	0

Quarterfinals
Akzhol Makhmudov (KGZ)	9
Furkan Bayrak (TUR)	0
Aziz Boualem (MAR)	0
Aram Vardanyan (UZB)	9
Sanan Suleymanov (AZE)	4
Amin Kavianinejad (IRI)	0
Bakhit Sharif Badr (QAT)	0
Lamjed Maafi (TUN)	8

Semifinals
Akzhol Makhmudov (KGZ)	7
Aram Vardanyan (UZB)	5
Sanan Suleymanov (AZE)	4
Lamjed Maafi (TUN)	3

Final
Akzhol Makhmudov (KGZ)	5
Sanan Suleymanov (AZE)	2

Bronze medals
Furkan Bayrak (TUR)	9
Aram Vardanyan (UZB)	0
Amin Kavianinejad (IRI)	1
Lamjed Maafi (TUN)	1

=== 82 kg ===
12 August

Round of 16
Mukhammadkodir Rasulov (UZB)	5
Rasoul Garmsiri (IRI)	2
Rafig Huseynov (AZE)	8
Ahmad Tawfiq Nabizada (AFG)	0
Emrah Kuş (TUR)	10
Dias Kalen (KAZ)	4

Quarterfinals
Kalidin Asykeev (KGZ)	6
Mukhammadkodir Rasulov (UZB)	0
Sultan Ali Eid (JOR)	4^{F}
Sukhrob Abdulkhaev (TJK)	5
Toýly Orazow (TKM)	0
Rafig Huseynov (AZE)	9
Emrah Kuş (TUR)	9
Jafar Khan (QAT)	0

Semifinals
Kalidin Asykeev (KGZ)	5
Sultan Ali Eid (JOR)	1
Rafig Huseynov (AZE)	2
Emrah Kuş (TUR)	1

Final
Kalidin Asykeev (KGZ)	3
Rafig Huseynov (AZE)	6

Repechage round 1
Ahmad Tawfiq Nabizada (AFG)	0
Toýly Orazow (TKM)	9

Bronze medals
Mukhammadkodir Rasulov (UZB)	9
Sultan Ali Eid (JOR)	0
Toýly Orazow (TKM)	0
Emrah Kuş (TUR)	8^{F}

=== 87 kg ===
13 August

Pos	Athlete	Pld	W	L	CP	TP	UZB	IRI	TUR	TKM
1	Jalgasbay Berdimuratov (UZB)	3	3	0	11	28	—	5–5	13–4	10–0
2	Ramin Taheri (IRI)	3	2	1	8	19	1–3 PO1	—	6–0	8–0
3	Mehmet Ali Küçükosman (TUR)	3	1	2	5	12	1–4 SU1	0–3 PO	—	8–0
4	Şyhazberdi Öwelekow (TKM)	3	0	3	0	0	0–4 SU	0–4 SU	0–4 SU	—

Source: UWW

Pos	Athlete	Pld	W	L	CP	TP	KGZ	AZE	TJK
1	Atabek Azisbekov (KGZ)	2	2	0	7	13	—	3–3	10–2
2	Mahammad Ahmadiyev (AZE)	2	1	1	5	11	1–3 PO1	—	8–0
3	Bakhtovar Khasanov (TJK)	2	0	2	1	2	1–4 SU1	0–4 SU	—

Source: UWW

Semifinals
Jalgasbay Berdimuratov (UZB)	8
Mahammad Ahmadiyev (AZE)	0
Atabek Azisbekov (KGZ)	1
Ramin Taheri (IRI)	1

Final
Jalgasbay Berdimuratov (UZB)	11
Ramin Taheri (IRI)	2
Bronze medal
Mahammad Ahmadiyev (AZE)	2
Atabek Azisbekov (KGZ)	3

=== 97 kg ===
12 August

Round of 16
Uzur Dzhuzupbekov (KGZ)	7
Adem Boudjemline (ALG)	1

Quarterfinals
Aýbegşazada Kürräýew (TKM)	0
Uzur Dzhuzupbekov (KGZ)	8
Mehdi Bali (IRI)	8
Arif Niftullayev (AZE)	0
Mirzoamin Safarov (TJK)	0
Rustam Assakalov (UZB)	9
Ibrahim Fallatah (KSA)	0
Beytullah Kayışdağ (TUR)	10

Semifinals
Uzur Dzhuzupbekov (KGZ)	7
Mehdi Bali (IRI)	3
Rustam Assakalov (UZB)	2
Beytullah Kayışdağ (TUR)	1

Final
Uzur Dzhuzupbekov (KGZ)	1
Rustam Assakalov (UZB)	3

Repechage round 1
Adem Boudjemline (ALG)	10
Aýbegşazada Kürräýew (TKM)	1

Bronze medals
Adem Boudjemline (ALG)	0
Mehdi Bali (IRI)	4
Mirzoamin Safarov (TJK)	0
Beytullah Kayışdağ (TUR)	8

=== 130 kg ===
13 August

Pos	Athlete	Pld	W	L	CP	TP	IRI	TUR	KGZ
1	Ali Akbar Yousefi (IRI)	2	2	0	6	15	—	9–5	6–4
2	Osman Yıldırım (TUR)	2	1	1	4	10	1–3 PO1	—	5–0
3	Roman Kim (KGZ)	2	0	2	1	4	1–3 PO1	0–3 PO	—

Source: UWW

Pos	Athlete	Pld	W	L	CP	TP	AZE	KAZ	UZB
1	Sabah Shariati (AZE)	2	2	0	6	9	—	5–1	4–1
2	Anton Savenko (KAZ)	2	1	1	6	4	1–3 PO1	—	3–5 Fall
3	Muminjon Abdullaev (UZB)	2	0	2	1	6	1–3 PO1	0–5 FA	—

Source: UWW

Semifinals
Ali Akbar Yousefi (IRI)	9
Anton Savenko (KAZ)	1
Sabah Shariati (AZE)	1
Osman Yıldırım (TUR)	3

Final
Ali Akbar Yousefi (IRI)	3
Osman Yıldırım (TUR)	2
Bronze medal
Anton Savenko (KAZ)	0
Sabah Shariati (AZE)	5

== Women's freestyle ==
=== 50 kg ===
10 August

Pos	Athlete	Pld	W	L	CP	TP	AZE	KAZ	TUR
1	Mariya Stadnik (AZE)	2	2	0	8	20	—	10–0	10–0
2	Svetlana Ankicheva (KAZ)	2	1	1	3	4	0–4 SU	—	4–1
3	Emine Çataloğlu (TUR)	2	0	2	1	1	0–4 SU	1–3 PO1	—

Source: UWW

Pos	Athlete	Pld	W	L	CP	TP	UZB	TUN	TKM
1	Jasmina Immaeva (UZB)	2	2	0	7	21	—	7–0	14–4
2	Sarra Hamdi (TUN)	2	1	1	5	16	0–3 PO	—	16–8 Fall
3	Laçyn Annamyradowa (TKM)	2	0	2	1	12	1–4 SU1	0–5 FA	—

Source: UWW

Semifinals
Mariya Stadnik (AZE)	10
Sarra Hamdi (TUN)	0
Jasmina Immaeva (UZB)	7
Svetlana Ankicheva (KAZ)	0

Final
Mariya Stadnik (AZE)	10
Jasmina Immaeva (UZB)	0
Bronze medal
Sarra Hamdi (TUN)	5
Svetlana Ankicheva (KAZ)	1

=== 53 kg ===
11 August

Quarterfinals		Semifinals		Final
Leyla Gurbanova (AZE)	6^{F}
Candra Marimar (INA)	2	Leyla Gurbanova (AZE)	10
Rahime Arı (TUR)	10	Rahime Arı (TUR)	0
Mim Mim (BAN)	0			Leyla Gurbanova (AZE)	6
Ellada Makhyaddinova (KAZ)	5			Aktenge Keunimjaeva (UZB)	1
Aktenge Keunimjaeva (UZB)	8	Aktenge Keunimjaeva (UZB)	7^{F}
Zineb Hassoune (MAR)	5	Vatansulton Shakarshoeva (TJK)	0
Vatansulton Shakarshoeva (TJK)	8^{F}

Bronze medals
Candra Marimar (INA)	2
Rahime Arı (TUR)	6^{F}
Ellada Makhyaddinova (KAZ)	7
Vatansulton Shakarshoeva (TJK)	2

=== 55 kg ===
12 August

Pos	Athlete	Pld	W	L	CP	TP	TUR	UZB	AZE	TUN
1	Zeynep Yetgil (TUR)	3	3	0	13	14	—	3–1 Fall	3–2	8–0 Fall
2	Shokhida Akhmedova (UZB)	3	2	1	7	18	0–5 FA	—	6–5	11–0
3	Elnura Mammadova (AZE)	3	1	2	6	18	1–3 PO1	1–3 PO1	—	11–0
4	Faten Hammami (TUN)	3	0	3	0	0	0–5 FA	0–4 SU	0–4 SU	—

Source: UWW

=== 57 kg ===
13 August

Pos	Athlete	Pld	W	L	CP	TP	AZE	KAZ	UZB
1	Zhala Aliyeva (AZE)	2	2	0	8	13	—	9–2	4–0 Fall
2	Laura Almaganbetova (KAZ)	2	1	1	4	6	1–3 PO1	—	4–1
3	Laylokhon Sobirova (UZB)	2	0	2	1	1	0–5 FA	1–3 PO1	—

Source: UWW

Pos	Athlete	Pld	W	L	CP	TP	NGR	TUR	TUN
1	Esther Kolawole (NGR)	2	2	0	7	21	—	10–0	11–7
2	Elvira Kamaloğlu (TUR)	2	1	1	5	8	0–4 SU	—	8–4 Fall
3	Siwar Bousetta (TUN)	2	0	2	1	11	1–3 PO1	0–5 FA	—

Source: UWW

Semifinals
Zhala Aliyeva (AZE)	9
Elvira Kamaloğlu (TUR)	6
Esther Kolawole (NGR)	11
Laura Almaganbetova (KAZ)	0

Final
Zhala Aliyeva (AZE)	14
Esther Kolawole (NGR)	6
Bronze medal
Elvira Kamaloğlu (TUR)	6^{F}
Laura Almaganbetova (KAZ)	2

=== 59 kg ===
10 August

Pos	Athlete	Pld	W	L	CP	TP	NGR	AZE	UZB	TUR	KAZ
1	Odunayo Adekuoroye (NGR)	4	4	0	16	27	—	3–1	10–0	4–0 Fall	10–0
2	Alyona Kolesnik (AZE)	4	3	1	16	27	1–3 PO1	—	10–3 Fall	4–2 Fall	12–0 Fall
3	Dilfuza Aimbetova (UZB)	4	1	3	6	10	0–4 SU	0–5 FA	—	2–5	5–0 Fall
4	Elmas Çelik (TUR)	4	1	3	3	7	0–5 FA	0–5 FA	3–1 PO1	—	0–2
5	Guldana Bekesh (KAZ)	4	1	3	3	2	0–4 SU	0–5 FA	0–5 FA	3–0 PO	—

Source: UWW

=== 62 kg ===
11 August

Quarterfinals		Semifinals		Final
Tetiana Omelchenko (AZE)	12
Nabira Esenbaeva (UZB)	2	Tetiana Omelchenko (AZE)	1
Fatoumata Camara (GUI)	12	Fatoumata Camara (GUI)	4
Kharisma Tantri Herlina (INA)	1			Fatoumata Camara (GUI)	0
Aisuluu Tynybekova (KGZ)	12^{F}			Aisuluu Tynybekova (KGZ)	11
Irina Kuznetsova (KAZ)	2	Aisuluu Tynybekova (KGZ)	10
Safiétou Goudiaby (SEN)	6	Safiétou Goudiaby (SEN)	0
Merve Karadeniz (TUR)	1

Bronze medals
Kharisma Tantri Herlina (INA)	0
Tetiana Omelchenko (AZE)	11
Irina Kuznetsova (KAZ)	5^{F}
Safiétou Goudiaby (SEN)	0

=== 65 kg ===
12 August

Pos	Athlete	Pld	W	L	CP	TP	KGZ	CMR	TUR
1	Dilnaz Sazanova (KGZ)	2	2	0	7	16	—	6–5	10–0
2	Berthe Etane Ngolle (CMR)	2	1	1	4	9	1–3 PO1	—	4–0
3	Yağmur Çakmak (TUR)	2	0	2	0	0	0–4 SU	0–3 PO	—

Source: UWW

Pos	Athlete	Pld	W	L	CP	TP	AZE	KAZ	UZB
1	Elis Manolova (AZE)	2	2	0	8	10	—	5–4 Fall	5–0
2	Yelena Shalygina (KAZ)	2	1	1	5	10	0–5 FA	—	6–2 Fall
3	Ariukhan Jumabaeva (UZB)	2	0	2	0	2	0–3 PO	0–5 FA	—

Source: UWW

Semifinals
Elis Manolova (AZE)	2
Berthe Etane Ngolle (CMR)	1
Dilnaz Sazanova (KGZ)	1
Yelena Shalygina (KAZ)	12

Final
Elis Manolova (AZE)	3
Yelena Shalygina (KAZ)	3
Bronze medal
Berthe Etane Ngolle (CMR)	2
Dilnaz Sazanova (KGZ)	8

=== 68 kg ===
13 August

Pos	Athlete	Pld	W	L	CP	TP	KGZ	TUR	UZB	BAN
1	Meerim Zhumanazarova (KGZ)	3	3	0	13	28	—	10–0	8–4 Fall	10–0
2	Aslı Demir (TUR)	3	2	1	10	7	0–4 SU	—	5–0 Fall	2–0 Fall
3	Azoda Esbergenova (UZB)	3	1	2	4	14	0–5 FA	0–5 FA	—	10–0
4	Halima Akter (BAN)	3	0	3	0	0	0–4 SU	0–5 FA	0–4 SU	—

Source: UWW

Pos	Athlete	Pld	W	L	CP	TP	KAZ	TKM	SUD
1	Madina Bakbergenova (KAZ)	2	2	0	9	11	—	11–0	WO
2	Oguljan Egemberdiýewa (TKM)	2	1	1	5	0	0–4 SU	—	WO
—	Patricia El-Nour (SUD)	2	0	2	0	0	0–5 FO	0–5 FO	—

Source: UWW

Semifinals
Meerim Zhumanazarova (KGZ)	11
Oguljan Egemberdiýewa (TKM)	0
Madina Bakbergenova (KAZ)	12^{F}
Aslı Demir (TUR)	6

Final
Meerim Zhumanazarova (KGZ)	11^{F}
Madina Bakbergenova (KAZ)	0
Bronze medal
Oguljan Egemberdiýewa (TKM)	0
Aslı Demir (TUR)	10

=== 72 kg ===
11 August

Round of 16
Godah Samsia Gassida (CHA)	3
Blandine Ngiri (CMR)	2^{F}
Buse Tosun (TUR)	12
Jemal Öwlýakulyýewa (TKM)	0

Quarterfinals
Svetlana Oknazarova (UZB)	4
Blandine Ngiri (CMR)	4^{F}
Nour Jeljeli (TUN)	5
Gozal Zutova (AZE)	16
Nurzat Nurtaeva (KGZ)	6
Anta Sambou (SEN)	7
Buse Tosun (TUR)	2
Zhamila Bakbergenova (KAZ)	1

Semifinals
Blandine Ngiri (CMR)	0
Gozal Zutova (AZE)	6
Anta Sambou (SEN)	1
Buse Tosun (TUR)	5

Final
Gozel Zutova (AZE)	0
Buse Tosun (TUR)	5^{F}

Repechage round 1
Jemal Öwlýakulyýewa (TKM)	0
Zhamila Bakbergenova (KAZ)	10

Bronze medals
Nour Jeljeli (TUN)	11
Blandine Ngiri (CMR)	4
Zhamila Bakbergenova (KAZ)	10
Anta Sambou (SEN)	0

=== 76 kg ===
12 August

Pos	Athlete	Pld	W	L	CP	TP	KGZ	CIV	INA
1	Aiperi Medet Kyzy (KGZ)	2	2	0	8	20	—	10–0	10–0
2	Amy Youin (CIV)	2	1	1	3	11	0–4 SU	—	11–10
3	Varadisa Septi (INA)	2	0	2	1	10	0–4 SU	1–3 PO1	—

Source: UWW

Pos	Athlete	Pld	W	L	CP	TP	KAZ	TUR	UZB
1	Inkara Zhanatayeva (KAZ)	2	2	0	6	12	—	5–4	7–0
2	Mehtap Gültekin (TUR)	2	1	1	4	9	1–3 PO1	—	5–1
3	Ozoda Zaripboeva (UZB)	2	0	2	1	1	0–3 PO	1–3 PO1	—

Source: UWW

Semifinals
Aiperi Medet Kyzy (KGZ)	10
Mehtap Gültekin (TUR)	0
Inkara Zhanatayeva (KAZ)	0
Amy Youin (CIV)	10^{F}

Final
Aiperi Medet Kyzy (KGZ)	10
Amy Youin (CIV)	0
Bronze medal
Mehtap Gültekin (TUR)	7
Inkara Zhanatayeva (KAZ)	1
