= 2023 European Wrestling Championships – Men's freestyle 61 kg =

Wrestling competition

Men's freestyle 61 kg at the 2023 European Wrestling Championships
- Venue: Arena Zagreb
- Location: Zagreb, Croatia
- Dates: 18-19 April
- Competitors: 14

Medalists
gold medal	Arsen Harutyunyan	Armenia
silver medal	Zelimkhan Abakarov	Albania
bronze medal	Emrah Ormanoğlu	Turkey
bronze medal	Shota Phartenadze	Georgia

The Men's Freestyle 61 kg is a competition featured at the 2023 European Wrestling Championships, and was held in Zagreb, Croatia on April 18 and 19.

== Results ==
Legend

- F — Won by fall

Round of 16
Daniel Popov (ISR)	1
Emrah Ormanoğlu (TUR)	11
Vladimir Egorov (MKD)	2
Arman Eloyan (FRA)	2
Ivaylo Tisov (BUL)	0
Nikolai Okhlopkov (ROU)	10
Taras Markovych (UKR)	5
Intigam Valizada (AZE)	4
Niklas Stechele (GER)	0
Zelimkhan Abakarov (ALB)	11
Igor Chichioi (MDA)	1
Gamzatgadzsi Halidov (HUN)	4

Quarterfinals
Arsen Harutyunyan (ARM)	7
Emrah Ormanoğlu (TUR)	0
Arman Eloyan (FRA)	3
Nikolai Okhlopkov (ROU)	0
Taras Markovych (UKR)	2
Zelimkhan Abakarov (ALB)	6
Gamzatgadzsi Halidov (HUN)	1
Shota Phartenadze (GEO)	5

Semifinals
Arsen Harutyunyan (ARM)	10
Arman Eloyan (FRA)	0
Zelimkhan Abakarov (ALB)	4
Shota Phartenadze (GEO)	4

Final
Arsen Harutyunyan (ARM)	5
Zelimkhan Abakarov (ALB)	2

Repechage round 1
Niklas Stechele (GER)	2
Taras Markovych (UKR)	7

Bronze medal match
Emrah Ormanoğlu (TUR)	2
Arman Eloyan (FRA)	1
Taras Markovych (UKR)	5
Shota Phartenadze (GEO)	6

== Final standing ==
Rank	Athlete
1st place, gold medalist(s)	Arsen Harutyunyan (ARM)
2nd place, silver medalist(s)	Zelimkhan Abakarov (ALB)
3rd place, bronze medalist(s)	Emrah Ormanoğlu (TUR)
3rd place, bronze medalist(s)	Shota Phartenadze (GEO)
5	Taras Markovych (UKR)
5	Arman Eloyan (FRA)
7	Nikolai Okhlopkov (ROU)
8	Gamzatgadzsi Halidov (HUN)
9	Intigam Valizada (AZE)
10	Vladimir Egorov (MKD)
11	Niklas Stechele (GER)
12	Igor Chichioi (MDA)
13	Daniel Popov (ISR)
14	Ivaylo Tisov (BUL)
