= 2022 U23 World Wrestling Championships – Men's freestyle 61 kg =

Wrestling competitions

Men's freestyle 61 kg at the 2022 U23 World Championships
- Venue: Pontevedra Municipal Sports Hall
- Dates: 22–23 October
- Competitors: 20 from 20 nations

Medalists
gold medal	Arsen Harutyunyan	Armenia
silver medal	Taiyrbek Zhumashbek Uulu	Kyrgyzstan
bronze medal	Assyl Aitakyn	Kazakhstan
bronze medal	Emrah Ormanoğlu	Turkey

The men's freestyle 61 kg is a competition featured at the 2022 U23 World Wrestling Championships, and was held in Pontevedra, Spain on 22 and 23 October 2022. The qualification rounds were held on 22 October while medal matches were held on the 2nd day of the competition. A total of 20 wrestlers competed in this event, limited to athletes whose body weight was less than 61 kilograms.

This freestyle wrestling competition consists of a single-elimination tournament, with a repechage used to determine the winner of two bronze medals. The two finalists face off for gold and silver medals. Each wrestler who loses to one of the two finalists moves into the repechage, culminating in a pair of bronze medal matches featuring the semifinal losers each facing the remaining repechage opponent from their half of the bracket.

== Results ==
Legend

- F — Won by fall

=== Final ===
Final
Arsen Harutyunyan (ARM)	7
Taiyrbek Zhumashbek Uulu (KGZ)	5

=== Top half ===
Round of 32
Ramaz Turmanidze (GEO)	4
Nico Megerle (GER)	1
Yousef Eissa (EGY)	0
Arsen Harutyunyan (ARM)	10

Round of 16
Stilyan Iliev (BUL)	11
Jason-Guy Luneau (CAN)	5
Ramaz Turmanidze (GEO)	8
Nils Leutert (SUI)	4
Joey Silva (PUR)	0
Arsen Harutyunyan (ARM)	11
Assyl Aitakyn (KAZ)	9
Armin Habibzadeh (IRI)	1

Quarterfinals
Stilyan Iliev (BUL)	2
Ramaz Turmanidze (GEO)	3
Arsen Harutyunyan (ARM)	9
Assyl Aitakyn (KAZ)	3

Semifinals
Ramaz Turmanidze (GEO)	4
Arsen Harutyunyan (ARM)	13

=== Bottom half ===
Round of 32
Intigam Valizada (AZE)	10
Rajapaksha Samaradivakara (SRI)	0
Adam Biboulatov (FRA)	0
Kodai Ogawa (JPN)	10

Round of 16
Taiyrbek Zhumashbek Uulu (KGZ)	9
Aaron Nagao (USA)	0
Intigam Valizada (AZE)	2
Elkin España (COL)	12
Andrii Dzhelep (UKR)	11
Kodai Ogawa (JPN)	4
Emrah Ormanoğlu (TUR)	10
Antonio Margiotta (PHI)	0

Quarterfinals
Taiyrbek Zhumashbek Uulu (KGZ)	11
Elkin España (COL)	0
Andrii Dzhelep (UKR)	2
Emrah Ormanoğlu (TUR)	7

Semifinals
Taiyrbek Zhumashbek Uulu (KGZ)	5
Emrah Ormanoğlu (TUR)	0

=== Repechage ===
Repechage round 1
Yousef Eissa (EGY)	1
Joey Silva (PUR)	3

Repechage round 2
Joey Silva (PUR)	1
Assyl Aitakyn (KAZ)	6
Aaron Nagao (USA)	14
Elkin España (COL)	4

Bronze medals
Assyl Aitakyn (KAZ)	12
Ramaz Turmanidze (GEO)	4
Aaron Nagao (USA)	4
Emrah Ormanoğlu (TUR)	9

== Final standing ==
Rank	Athlete
1st place, gold medalist(s)	Arsen Harutyunyan (ARM)
2nd place, silver medalist(s)	Taiyrbek Zhumashbek Uulu (KGZ)
3rd place, bronze medalist(s)	Assyl Aitakyn (KAZ)
3rd place, bronze medalist(s)	Emrah Ormanoğlu (TUR)
5	Ramaz Turmanidze (GEO)
5	Aaron Nagao (USA)
7	Elkin España (COL)
8	Kodai Ogawa (JPN)
9	Intigam Valizada (AZE)
10	Stilyan Iliev (BUL)
11	Andrii Dzhelep (UKR)
12	Joey Silva (PUR)
13	Jason-Guy Luneau (CAN)
14	Nils Leutert (SUI)
15	Nico Megerle (GER)
16	Armin Habibzadeh (IRI)
17	Yousef Eissa (EGY)
18	Rajapaksha Samaradivakara (SRI)
19	Adam Biboulatov (FRA)
20	Antonio Margiotta (PHI)
