= Shota Phartenadze =

Georgian freestyle wrestler

Personal information
- Native name: შოთა ფარტენაძე
- Born: 28 November 1994 (age 31) Adjara, Georgia
- Height: 1.70 m (5 ft 7 in)
- Weight: 61 kg (134 lb; 9.6 st)

Sport
- Country: Georgia
- Sport: Amateur wrestling
- Weight class: 61 kg
- Event: Freestyle

Achievements and titles
- World finals: (bronze) (2023)
- Regional finals: (bronze) (2022)
Medal record
Men's freestyle wrestling
Representing Georgia
World Championships
Bronze medal – third place	2023 Belgrade	61 kg
European Championships
Bronze medal – third place	2023 Zagreb	61 kg
Grand Prix
Gold medal – first place	2013 Nice	60 kg
Gold medal – first place	2017 Paris	61 kg
Silver medal – second place	2016 Paris	61 kg
Silver medal – second place	2023 Bishkek	61 kg
European U23 Championships
Bronze medal – third place	2016 Russe	61 kg
European Cadets Championships
Bronze medal – third place	2011 Szombathely	54 kg

Shota Phartenadze (born 28 November 1994) is a Georgian freestyle wrestler.

== Career ==
Phartenadze won the bronze medal at the 2023 European Wrestling Championships in Zagreb, Croatia by defeating Ukrainian Taras Markovych 6–5 in the third place match in the 61 kg freestyle category.

He won one of bronze medals in the men's 61 kg event at the 2023 World Wrestling Championships held in Belgrade, Serbia.
