= Jahongirmirza Turobov =

Uzbekistani freestyle wrestler

Personal information
- Nationality: Uzbekistan
- Height: 168 cm (5 ft 6 in)

Sport
- Country: Uzbekistan
- Sport: Wrestling
- Weight class: 61 kg
- Event: Freestyle
Medal record
Men's freestyle wrestling
Representing Uzbekistan
Islamic Solidarity Games
Gold medal – first place	2021 Konya	61 kg
Asian Championships
Gold medal – first place	2021 Almaty	61 kg
Asian Juniors Championships
Gold medal – first place	2021 Taichung	55 kg

Jahongirmirza Turobov is an Uzbekistani freestyle wrestler. He won the gold medal in the men's 61 kg event at the 2021 Islamic Solidarity Games held in Konya, Turkey.

== Career ==
Turobov competed in the men's 57 kg event the Golden Grand Prix Ivan Yarygin 2018 held in Krasnoyarsk, Russia. He competed in the 61 kg event at the 2019 Asian Wrestling Championships held in Xi'an, China. In that same year, he competed in the 57 kg event at the World Wrestling Championships held in Nur-Sultan, Kazakhstan. He won his first match and he was then eliminated in his next match by Erdenebatyn Bekhbayar of Mongolia.

Turobov competed in the men's 61 kg event at the 2020 Asian Wrestling Championships held in New Delhi, India. He won the gold medal in his event at the 2021 Asian Wrestling Championships held in Almaty, Kazakhstan. He competed in the 2021 Waclaw Ziolkowski Memorial held in Warsaw, Poland.

In 2022, Turobov competed in the men's 61 kg event at the Asian Wrestling Championships held in Ulaanbaatar, Mongolia. A few months later, he won the gold medal in the men's 61 kg event at the 2021 Islamic Solidarity Games held in Konya, Turkey. Turobov competed in the 61 kg event at the 2022 World Wrestling Championships held in Belgrade, Serbia.

Turobov competed at the 2023 Ibrahim Moustafa Tournament held in Alexandria, Egypt. He also competed in the men's 61 kg event at the 2023 World Wrestling Championships held in Belgrade, Serbia.

== Achievements ==
Year	Tournament	Location	Result	Event
2021	Asian Championships	Almaty, Kazakhstan	1st	Freestyle 61 kg
2022	Islamic Solidarity Games	Konya, Turkey	1st	Freestyle 61 kg
