= Taiyrbek Zhumashbek Uulu =

Kyrgyzstani freestyle wrestler

Personal information
- Native name: Тайырбек Жумашбек уулу
- Born: 2000 (age 25–26) Kyrgyzstan
- Height: 1.65 m (5 ft 5 in)
- Weight: 61 kg (134 lb; 9.6 st)

Sport
- Country: Kyrgyzstan
- Sport: Amateur wrestling
- Weight class: 61 kg
- Event: Freestyle

Achievements and titles
- World finals: (bronze) (2023)
- Regional finals: (gold) (2023)
Medal record
Men's freestyle wrestling
Representing Kyrgyzstan
World Championships
Bronze medal – third place	2023 Belgrade	61 kg
Asian Championships
Gold medal – first place	2023 Astana	61 kg
Gold medal – first place	2024 Bishkek	61 kg
Bronze medal – third place	2025 Amman	65 kg
Yasar Dogu Tournament
Bronze medal – third place	2024 Antalya	61 kg
Grand Prix
Gold medal – first place	2022 New York	65 kg
Gold medal – first place	2022 Taraz	61 kg
Gold medal – first place	2023 Alexandria	61 kg
Gold medal – first place	2025 Ulaanbaatar	65 kg
Silver medal – second place	2024 Budapest	61 kg
Silver medal – second place	2025 Tirana	65 kg
Silver medal – second place	2025 Budapest	61 kg
World U23 Championships
Silver medal – second place	2022 Pontevedra	61 kg
Asian U23 Championships
Gold medal – first place	2022 Bishkek	61 kg
Asian Juniors Championships
Bronze medal – third place	2019 Chon Buri	57 kg
Representing All-World Team
World Cup
Bronze medal – third place	2022 Coralville	Team

Taiyrbek Zhumashbek Uulu (born 2000) is a Kyrgyzstani freestyle wrestler. He is a bronze medalist at the World Wrestling Championships and a two-time gold medalist at the Asian Wrestling Championships.

== Career ==
Zhumashbek Uulu won the gold medal at the 2023 Asian Wrestling Championships in Astana, Kazakhstan by defeating Chinese Liu Minghu 6–5 in final match in the 61 kg freestyle category.

He won one of bronze medals in the men's 61 kg event at the 2023 World Wrestling Championships held in Belgrade, Serbia.

== Achievements ==
Year	Tournament	Location	Result	Event
2023	World Championships	Belgrade, Serbia	3rd	Freestyle 61 kg
2023	Asian Championships	Astana, Kazakhstan	1st	Freestyle 61 kg
2024	Asian Championships	Bishkek, Kyrgyzstan	1st	Freestyle 61 kg
