= Emrah Ormanoğlu =

Turkish freestyle wrestler

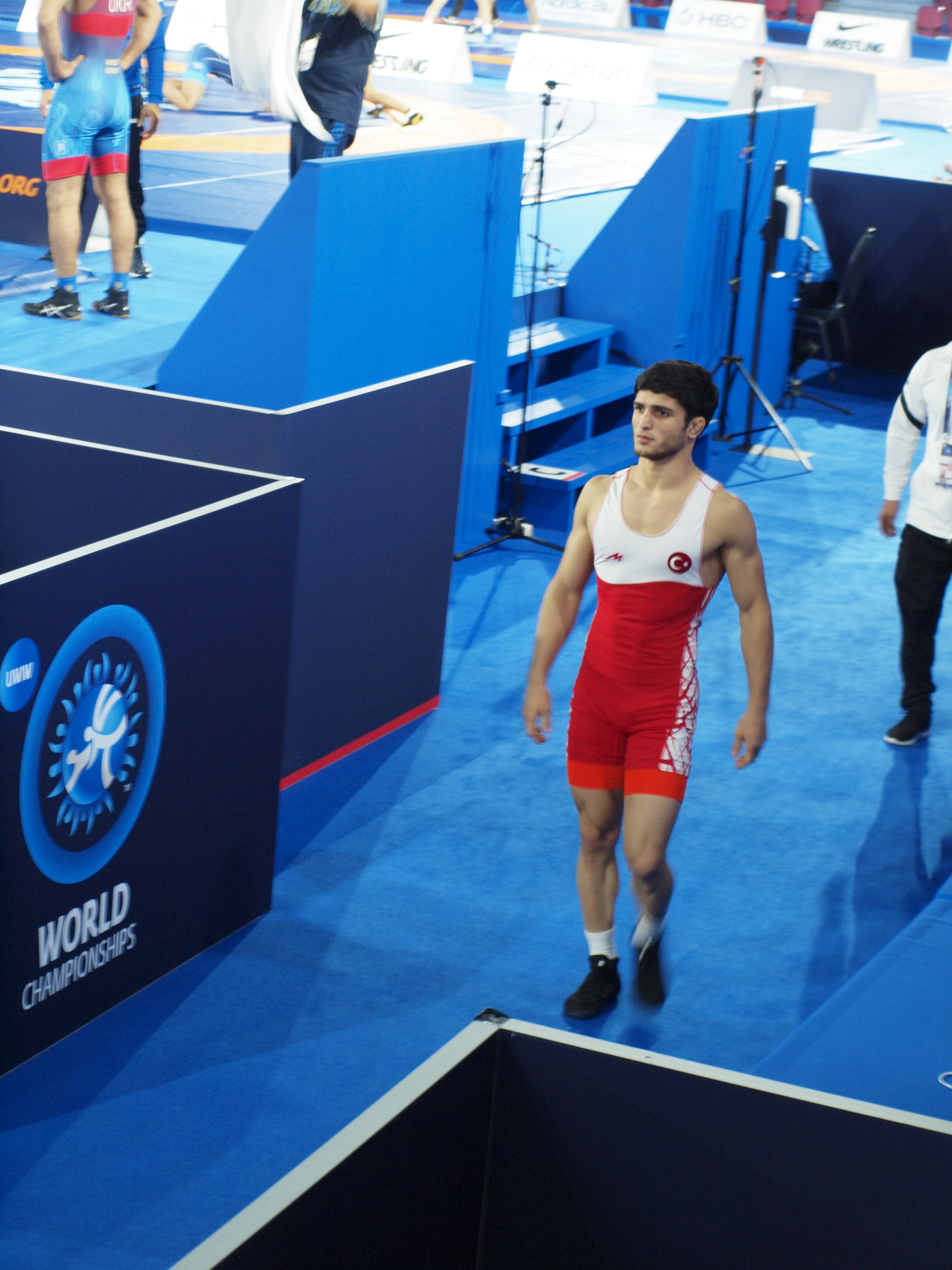

Personal information
- Born: 1999 (age 26–27) Donbas, Ukraine
- Height: 1.60 m (5 ft 3 in)
- Weight: 65 kg (143 lb; 10.2 st)

Sport
- Country: Turkey
- Sport: Amateur wrestling
- Event: Freestyle
- Club: Kocaeli B.Ş.B.
Medal record
Men's freestyle wrestling
Representing Turkey
European Championships
Bronze medal – third place	2023 Zagreb	61 kg
Yasar Dogu Tournament
Gold medal – first place	2023 Istanbul	61 kg
Gold medal – first place	2025 Kocaeli	61 kg
Silver medal – second place	2026 Antalya	61 kg
Bronze medal – third place	2019 Istanbul	61 kg
Dan Kolov & Nikola Petrov Tournament
Bronze medal – third place	2026 Plovdiv	65 kg
Grand Prix
Bronze medal – third place	2023 Zagreb	61 kg
World U23 Championships
Bronze medal – third place	2022 Pontevedra	61 kg
European U23 Championships
Gold medal – first place	2022 Plovdiv	61 kg
Bronze medal – third place	2021 Skopje	61 kg

Emrah Ormanoğlu (born 1999) is a Turkish freestyle wrestler competing in the 65 kg division. He is a member of Kocaeli B.Ş.B..

== Career ==
In 2023 he won one of the bronze medals in the men's 61 kg event at the 2023 European Wrestling Championships held in Zagreb, Croatia. Emrah defeated his Israeli rival Daniel Popov with 11–1 technical superiority in the first round of the men's freestyle 61 kg category at the 2023 European Wrestling Championships in Zagreb, Croatia and reached the quarterfinals. Emrah, who faced Armenian rival Arsen Harutyunyan in the quarterfinals, was defeated 7–0, but after his opponent reached the final, he competed in the bronze medal match. In the bronze medal match, he defeated his rival Arman Eloyan, who competed for France, 2–1 and became the 3rd in Europe.

== Achievements ==
Year	Tournament	Location	Result	Event
2023	European Championships	Zagreb, Croatia	3rd	Freestyle 61 kg

== Personal life ==
His family are of Turkish Meskhetian origin.
