= Jasmina Immaeva =

Uzbekistani freestyle wrestler

Personal information
- Born: 23 July 2001 (age 25)

Sport
- Country: Uzbekistan
- Sport: Amateur wrestling
- Weight class: 50 kg
- Event: Freestyle
Medal record
Women's freestyle wrestling
Representing Uzbekistan
Asian Championships
Silver medal – second place	2021 Almaty	50 kg
Silver medal – second place	2023 Astana	50 kg
Bronze medal – third place	2022 Ulaanbaatar	50 kg
Islamic Solidarity Games
Silver medal – second place	2021 Konya	50 kg

Jasmina Immaeva (born 23 July 2001) is an Uzbekistani freestyle wrestler. She won the silver medal in the 50 kg event at the 2021 Islamic Solidarity Games held in Konya, Turkey. She is also a three-time medalist at the Asian Wrestling Championships.

Immaeva won the silver medal in her event at the 2021 Asian Wrestling Championships held in Almaty, Kazakhstan. She won the bronze medal in her event at the 2022 Asian Wrestling Championships held in Ulaanbaatar, Mongolia. Immaeva competed in the 50 kg event at the 2022 World Wrestling Championships held in Belgrade, Serbia.

She competed at the 2023 Ibrahim Moustafa Tournament held in Alexandria, Egypt. Immaeva won the silver medal in her event at the 2023 Asian Wrestling Championships held in Astana, Kazakhstan. Immaeva competed at the 2024 Asian Wrestling Championships held in Bishkek, Kyrgyzstan.

== Achievements ==
Year	Tournament	Location	Result	Event
2021	Asian Championships	Almaty, Kazakhstan	2nd	Freestyle 50 kg
2022	Asian Championships	Ulaanbaatar, Mongolia	3rd	Freestyle 50 kg
2022	Islamic Solidarity Games	Konya, Turkey	2nd	Freestyle 50 kg
2023	Asian Championships	Astana, Kazakhstan	2nd	Freestyle 50 kg
