= 2024 African Championships in Athletics – Women's 400 metres hurdles =

Women's 400 metres hurdles at the 2024 African Championships in Athletics
- Venue: Japoma Stadium
- Location: Douala, Cameroon
- Dates: 25 June (heats); 26 June (final)
- Competitors: 14 from 8 nations
- Winning time: 55.71

Medalists
| gold medal | Rogail Joseph | South Africa |
| silver medal | Noura Ennadi | Morocco |
| bronze medal | Linda Angounou | Cameroon |

The women's 400 metres hurdles event at the 2024 African Championships in Athletics was held on 25 and 26 June in Douala, Cameroon.

== Records ==
Records before the 2024 African Athletics Championships
| Record | Athlete (nation) | Time (s) | Location | Date |
|---|---|---|---|---|
| World record | Sydney McLaughlin (USA) | 50.68 | Eugene, United States | 22 July 2022 |
| African record | Nezha Bidouane (MAR) | 52.90 | Seville, Spain | 25 August 1999 |
| Championship record | Nezha Bidouane (MAR) | 54.24 | Dakar, Senegal | 22 August 1998 |
| World leading | Femke Bol (NED) | 52.49 | Rome, Italy | 11 June 2024 |
| African leading | Zenéy Geldenhuys (RSA) | 54.72 | Pietermaritzburg, South Africa | 19 April 2024 |

== Results ==
=== Heats ===
Qualification: First 3 of each heat (Q) and the next 2 fastest (q) qualified for the final.

| Rank | Heat | Name | Nationality | Time | Notes |
|---|---|---|---|---|---|
| 1 | 1 | Noura Ennadi | Morocco | 55.72 | Q |
| 2 | 1 | Rogail Joseph | South Africa | 55.92 | Q |
| 3 | 2 | Linda Angounou | Cameroon | 56.29 | Q |
| 4 | 1 | Ashley Miller | Zimbabwe | 56.73 | Q |
| 5 | 1 | Dinedye Denis | Ivory Coast | 57.01 | q |
| 6 | 2 | Vanice Nyagisera | Kenya | 58.62 | Q |
| 7 | 2 | Tumi Ramokgopa | South Africa | 58.64 | Q |
| 8 | 1 | Banchiayehu Tesema | Ethiopia | 59.02 | q, NU20R |
| 9 | 2 | Patrone Kouvoutoukila | South Africa | 59.03 | NR |
| 10 | 1 | Rahab Ndirangu | Kenya | 59.20 | |
| 11 | 2 | Tigist Ayana | Ethiopia | 59.51 | |
| 12 | 1 | Audrey Nkamsao | Cameroon | 1:01.42 | |
| 13 | 1 | Fatoumata Koala | Burkina Faso | 1:02.12 | |
| 14 | 2 | Emebet Teketel | Ethiopia | 1:02.55 | |
| | 2 | Carolina Yonengue | Angola | DNS | |

=== Final ===
| Rank | Lane | Athlete | Nationality | Time | Notes |
|---|---|---|---|---|---|
| 1st place, gold medalist(s) | 5 | Rogail Joseph | South Africa | 55.71 | |
| 2nd place, silver medalist(s) | 4 | Noura Ennadi | Morocco | 56.16 | |
| 3rd place, bronze medalist(s) | 3 | Linda Angounou | Cameroon | 56.48 | |
| 4 | 8 | Ashley Miller | Zimbabwe | 57.43 | |
| 5 | 2 | Dinedye Denis | Ivory Coast | 58.49 | |
| 6 | 7 | Tumi Ramokgopa | South Africa | 58.90 | |
| 7 | 6 | Vanice Nyagisera | Kenya | 59.77 | |
| 8 | 1 | Banchiayehu Tesema | Ethiopia | 1:01.30 | |

== See also ==
- Athletics at the 2023 African Games – Women's 400 metres hurdles
