= List of Cameroonian records in athletics =

The following are the national records in athletics in Cameroon maintained by Cameroon's national athletics federation: Fédération Camerounaise d'Athlétisme (FCA).

== Outdoor ==
Key to tables: Awaiting ratification Record not kept by FCA Not ratified or later rescinded by FCA

=== Men ===
Event	Record	Athlete	Date	Meet	Place	Ref.
100 m	9.83 (+1.3 m/s)	Emmanuel Eseme	28 July 2026	Commonwealth Games	Glasgow, United Kingdom	
200 m	20.23 (+0.8 m/s)	Emmanuel Eseme	7 July 2025	Meeting International Sotteville	Sotteville-lès-Rouen, France	
400 m	46.34	Emmanuel Bitanga	29 March 1980		Abidjan, Côte d'Ivoire	
800 m	1:48.6 h	Paulin Nyatchou	9 June 2001		Yaoundé, Cameroon	
1500 m	3:49.7 h	Pierre Foka	7 June 1997		Yaoundé, Cameroon	
3000 m	8:19.82	Pierre Foka	20 July 1999		Saint-Maur, France	
5000 m	14:18.4 h	Adamou Aboubakar	15 July 1995		Yaoundé, Cameroon	
10,000 m	30:07.3	Pierre Foka	26 August 1995		Yaoundé, Cameroon	
Half marathon	1:05:49	Adamou Aboubakar	7 October 2001	Bristol Half Marathon	Bristol, United Kingdom	
Marathon	2:15:43	Justilin Foimi	27 October 2019		Douala, Cameroon	
110 m hurdles	14.31 NWI	Francis Kaméni	23 June 1990		Bron, France	
400 m hurdles	51.89	Emmanuel Youmékoué Touko	24 July 2005		Yaoundé, Cameroon	
3000 m steeplechase	9:16.19	Esau Ade Nji	15 January 1973	All-Africa Games	Lagos, Nigeria	
High jump	2.28 m	Fernand Djouméssi	19 June 2014	18th High Jump Meet	Bühl, Germany	
Pole vault	4.60 m	David Williams Nzodom Djozing	4 October 2015		Tourcoing, France	
Long jump	8.03 m A NWI	Marcel Mayack	2 March 2019	Bafoussam Interclubs	Bafoussam, Cameroon	
Triple jump	17.14 (+0.8 m/s)	Hugo Mamba Schlick	12 October 2010	Commonwealth Games	New Delhi, India	
Shot put	17.07 m	Quentin Soné Ehawa	18 May 1997		Aulnay-sous-Bois, France	
Discus throw	53.08 m	Pierre Ndongo	17 October 1997		Le Plessis-Robinson, France	
Hammer throw	45.14 m	Jean-David Franz	24 April 2005		Obernai, France	
Javelin throw	62.98 m	Claude Chamaken	11 June 2017	CAA Meet	Yaoundé, Cameroon	
Decathlon	6258 pts	Ernest Tché Noubossi	11–12 August 1987	All-Africa Games	Nairobi, Kenya	
Decathlon	100m (wind) / Long jump (wind) / Shot put / High jump / 400m / 110m H (wind) / Discus / Pole vault / Javelin / 1500m; 10.90 / 6.21 m / 13.88 m / 1.80 m / 48.68 / 17.05 / 28.72 m / 2.80 m / 49.20 m / 4:57.36					
20 km walk (road)	1:32:17	Gabriel Ngnintedem	30 July 2006		Yaoundé, Cameroon	
50 km walk (road)	5:05:51	Daniel Foudjem Ngano	14 May 2006	World Race Walking Cup	A Coruña, Spain	
4 × 100 m relay	39.25	Cameroon; Jean-Francis Ngapout; Serge Bengono; Joseph Batangdon; Claude Toukene	28 August 1999	World Championships	Seville, Spain	
4 × 400 m relay	3:11.9 h	D. W. Afabaga; M. Moualal; D. Nyamjua; N. Tetndap	25 March 2017		Yaoundé, Cameroon	

=== Women ===
Event	Record	Athlete	Date	Meet	Place	Ref.
100 m	10.98 (+0.6 m/s)	Myriam Léonie Mani	11 June 2001	Athens Grand Prix Tsiklitiria	Athens, Greece	
200 m	22.41 (+0.2 m/s)	Myriam Léonie Mani	21 May 2000		Kourou, France	
400 m	50.69	Mireille Nguimgo	13 August 2000		La Chaux-de-Fonds, Switzerland	
800 m	2:03.9 h	Stéphanie Zanga	9 June 2001		Yaoundé, Cameroon	
1500 m	4:13.57	Florence Djépé	3 July 2003		Bron, France	
3000 m	9:15.43	Florence Djepe	25 May 2002		Lisbon, Portugal	
5000 m	16:31.08	Thérèse Ngono Etoundi	5 October 2009		Beirut, Lebanon	
10,000 m	36:47.3 h	Tatou Tchinda	31 May 2010		Yaoundé, Cameroon	
Marathon	2:58:47	Immaculate Tari Wirngo	21 April 2008	Boston Marathon	Boston, United States	
100 m hurdles	13.41	Carole Kaboud Mebam	2 July 2008		Strasbourg, France	
400 m hurdles	55.09	Linda Angounou	8 August 2024	Olympic Games	Paris, France	
3000 m steeplechase						
High jump	1.80 m	Cécile Ngambi	24 July 1980	Olympic Games	Moscow, Soviet Union	
High jump	1.80 m	Lolita Nack	16 June 1996		Yaoundé, Cameroon	
Pole vault	2.60 m	Manuela Cancade	16 June 2013		Bourg-en-Bresse, France	
Long jump	6.55 (+1.3 m/s)	Françoise Mbango Etone	16 September 1999	All-Africa Games	Johannesburg, South Africa	
Triple jump	15.39 (+0.5 m/s)	Françoise Mbango Etone	17 August 2008	Olympic Games	Beijing, China	
Shot put	18.37 m	Auriol Dongmo Mekemnang	3 June 2017	Grande Premio Brasil Caixa de Atletismo	São Bernardo do Campo, Brazil	
Discus throw	53.54 m	Marie-Francine Mvoto Abeng	30 June 2013		Maisons-Laffitte, France	
Hammer throw	67.42 m A	Georgina Toth (Note: Georgina Toth switched from Hungary to Cameroon in 2008)	18 July 2008		Flagstaff, United States	
Javelin throw	49.10 m	Monique Djikada	1 July 2000		Yaoundé, Cameroon	
Heptathlon	5360 pts	Antoinette Djimou	25–26 July 2003		Narbonne, France	
Heptathlon	100m H (wind) / High jump / Shot put / 200m (wind) / Long jump (wind) / Javelin / 800m; 14.18 / 1.63 m / 12.01 m / 25.45 / 5.82 m / 40.12 m / 2:32.41					
Heptathlon	5817 pts #	Anaelle Nyabeu Djapa	24–25 May 2014	Meeting Arona	Arona, Spain	
Heptathlon	100m H (wind) / High jump / Shot put / 200m (wind) / Long jump (wind) / Javelin / 800m; 13.64 (−0.5 m/s) / 1.65 m / 13.79 m / 25.31 (±0.0 m/s) / 5.78 m (−0.9 m/s) / 41.86 m / 2:16.81					
20 km walk (road)	1:57:46	Anne Hortense Ebéna	2 November 1999		Yaoundé, Cameroon	
20 km walk (road)	1:54:35	Beatrice Hamidou Tayki'oo	4 August 2023	Jeux de la Francophonie	Kinshasa, Democratic Republic of Congo	
4 × 100 m relay	44.58	Cameroon; Myriam Léonie Mani; Georgette Nkoma; Edwige Abena Fouda; Sylvie Mballa Eloundou	21 July 1996		Marietta, United States	
4 × 400 m relay	3:27.08	Cameroon; Mireille Nguimgo; Carole Kaboud Mebam; Delphine Atangana; Hortense Bewouda	31 August 2003	World Championships	Saint-Denis, France	

=== Mixed ===
Event	Record	Athlete	Date	Meet	Place	Ref.
4 × 400 m relay	3:28.72	Cameroon; Linda Nganguele; Irene Bell Bonong; Tentdap Nsangou; Christelle Angounou	11 August 2022	Islamic Solidarity Games	Konya, Turkey	

== Indoor ==
=== Men ===
Event	Record	Athlete	Date	Meet	Place	Ref.
60 m	6.52	Emmanuel Eseme	1 March 2024	World Championships	Glasgow, United Kingdom	
60 m	6.52 m	Emmanuel Eseme	20 March 2026	World Championships	Toruń, Poland	
200 m	20.47	Joseph Batangdon	2 March 2003		Aubière, France	
400 m	48.91	Emmanuel Bitanga	1988		France	
400 m	48.7 h	Emmanuel Bitanga	6 February 1988		Paris, France	
800 m	2:08.81	Kah Batupe	18 March 2010	Nuorisohallikisat	Helsinki, Finland	
1500 m						
3000 m	8:51.28	Stanislas Talontsi	9 February 2008		Padua, Italy	
60 m hurdles	8.29	Uriel Dissi Tchawo	31 January 2016		Lyon, France	
High jump	2.25 m	Fernand Djoumessi	23 February 2014		Bordeaux, France	
Pole vault	4.17 m	David Williams Nzodom Djozing	2 February 2014		Lille, France	
Long jump	7.81 m	Fred Salle	20 February 1988		Boston, United States	
Triple jump	16.54 m	Hugo Mamba-Schlick	24 February 2013		Metz, France	
Shot put	16.81 m	Quentin Soné Ehawa	25 January 1998		Paris, France	
Heptathlon						
Heptathlon	60m / Long jump / Shot put / High jump / 60m H / Pole vault / 1000m					
5000 m walk						
4 × 400 m relay						

=== Women ===
Event	Record	Athlete	Date	Meet	Place	Ref.
60 m	7.18	Myriam Léonie Mani	30 January 2000		Dortmund, Germany	
200 m	23.37	Myriam Léonie Mani	11 February 2000	Indoor Flanders Meeting	Ghent, Belgium	
200 m	23.34 OT	Myriam Léonie Mani	29 January 1999		Johnson City, United States	
400 m	52.62	Mireille Nguimgo	2 March 2003		Aubière, France	
800 m	2:16.32	Florence Djépé	6 December 2003		Eaubonne, France	
1500 m	4:21.78	Florence Djépé	1 March 2003		Aubière, France	
3000 m	11:19.44	Marie-Mado Amana Assanga	29 November 2015		Nogent-sur-Oise, France	
60 m hurdles	8.34	Carole Kaboud Mebam	19 January 2008		Luxembourg, Luxembourg	
400 m hurdles	1:01.04	Carole Kaboud Mebam	12 February 2012	Meeting National	Val-de-Reuil, France	
High jump	1.69 m	Antoinette Djimou	14 December 2002		Paris, France	
Pole vault	2.40 m	Manuella Cancade	30 November 2013		Lyon, France	
Long jump	6.13 m	Françoise Mbango Etone	1 February 2003		Mondeville, France	
Triple jump	14.88 m	Françoise Mbango Etone	15 March 2003	World Championships	Birmingham, United Kingdom	
Shot put	16.95 m	Auriol Dongmo Mekemnang (Note: Dongmo Mekemnan represented Cameroon until 2017, transferring her eligibility to Portugal which became active in 2020)	3 February 2019	Portuguese Championships	Pombal, Portugal	
Shot put	18.37 m	Auriol Dongmo Mekemnang	29 February 2020	Portuguese Championships	Pombal, Portugal	
Pentathlon	4151 pts	Anaelle Nyabeu Djapa	23 February 2014	French Championships	Bordeaux, France	
Pentathlon	60m H / High jump / Shot put / Long jump / 800m; 8.45 / 1.64 m / 13.79 m / 5.82 m / 2:24.39					
3000 m walk						
4 × 400 m relay						
