= Zenéy Geldenhuys =

South African athlete (born 2000)

Personal information
- Born: Zenéy van der Walt; 22 May 2000 (age 26) Pretoria, South Africa

Sport
- Sport: Track and field
- Events: 400 m, 400 m hurdles, 4×400 m relay

Achievements and titles
- Personal bests: 400 m: 50.81 (2023); 400 m hurdles: 54.47 (2022)
Medal record
Women's athletics
Representing South Africa
African Championships
Gold medal – first place	2022 Saint Pierre	400 m hurdles
Gold medal – first place	2022 Saint Pierre	4x400 m relay
Commonwealth Games
Bronze medal – third place	2022 Birmingham	400 m hurdles
Universiade
Silver medal – second place	2019 Naples	400 m hurdles
World Youth Championships
Gold medal – first place	2017 Nairobi	400 m hurdles
Gold medal – first place	2018 Tampere	400 m hurdles
World Relays
Bronze medal – third place	2025 Guangzhou	4×400 m relay

Zenéy Geldenhuys (née van der Walt; born 22 May 2000) is a South African athlete who competes in hurdling and sprinting. She specialises in the 400 metres hurdles, where she is the 2022 African Champion, and in the 400 metres. In the 4 × 400 metres relay, she is the 2022 African Champion with the South African women's team.

She also won gold medals at the 2017 World U18 Championships and the 2018 World U20 Championships. In 2019, she won a silver medal at the Universiade.

== Early life and background ==
Zenéy van der Walt was born on 22 May 2000 in Pretoria, South Africa.

She started practising athletics around the age of six.

As of 2022, she was studying education at the University of Pretoria.

== Personal bests ==
Information from her World Athletics profile unless otherwise noted.

=== Individual events ===
Personal best times for individual events
Type	Event	Time	Venue	Date	Notes
Outdoor	200 metres	23.84	Celle Ligure, Italy	19 July 2023	(Wind: +0.5 m/s)
Outdoor	300 metres	36.62	Pretoria, South Africa	18 February 2023	
Outdoor	400 metres	50.81	Pretoria, South Africa	12 April 2023	
Outdoor	100 metres hurdles	14.05	Pretoria, South Africa	4 March 2023	(Wind: +0.7 m/s)
Outdoor	400 metres hurdles	53.90	Paris, France	6 August 2024	

==== Season's bests ====
Season's best times for individual events
Year	200 m	400 m	400 m hurdles
2015	—N/a	55.67	—N/a
2016	—N/a	55.10	59.31
2017	24.95	55.34	57.94
2018	24.55	—N/a	55.05
2019	25.27	52.89	55.73
2020	—N/a	—N/a	—N/a
2021	23.93	52.94	55.89
2022	24.03	51.90	**54.47**
2023	23.84	**50.82**	54.82
2024	**23.34**	51.71	54.72

Key: Lifetime best (in bold)

=== Team events ===
Personal best times for team events
Type	Event	Time	Venue	Date	Notes
Outdoor	4 x 400 metres relay women	3:29.34	Saint Pierre, Mauritius	12 June 2022	Teamed with Miranda Coetzee, Taylon Bieldt, and Precious Molepo.

== International competitions ==
Information from her World Athletics profile unless otherwise noted.

Representing South Africa
Year	Competition	Venue	Position	Event	Time	Notes
2017	World U18 Championships	Nairobi, Kenya	1st	400 m hurdles	58.23	
2018	World U20 Championships	Tampere, Finland	1st	400 m hurdles	55.34	
2019	Universiade	Naples, Italy	2nd	400 m hurdles	55.73	
2019	Universiade	Naples, Italy	7th	4 × 400 m relay	3:35.97	
2019	African Games	Rabat, Morocco	4th	400 m hurdles	57.67	
2019	African Games	Rabat, Morocco	5th	4 × 400 m relay	3:41.17	
2019	World Championships	Doha, Qatar	31st (h)	400 m hurdles	57.11	
2022	African Championships	Port Louis, Mauritius	1st	400 m hurdles	56.00	
2022	African Championships	Port Louis, Mauritius	1st	4 × 400 m relay	3:29.34	
2022	World Championships	Eugene, United States	16th (sf)	400 m hurdles	54.81	
2022	World Championships	Eugene, United States	14th (h)	4 × 400 m relay	3:46.68	
2022	Commonwealth Games	Birmingham, United Kingdom	3rd	400 m hurdles	54.47	
2023	World Championships	Budapest, Hungary	21st (sf)	400 m	51.54	
2023	World Championships	Budapest, Hungary	21st (sf)	400 m hurdles	55.49	
2024	Olympic Games	Paris, France	9th (sf)	400 m hurdles	53.90	
2025	World Championships	Tokyo, Japan	20th (sf)	400 m hurdles	55.06	
2025	World Championships	Tokyo, Japan	15th (h)	4 × 400 m relay	3:28.14	
