= Athletics at the 2024 Summer Olympics – Women's 400 metres hurdles =

Women's 400 metres hurdles at the Games of the XXXIII Olympiad
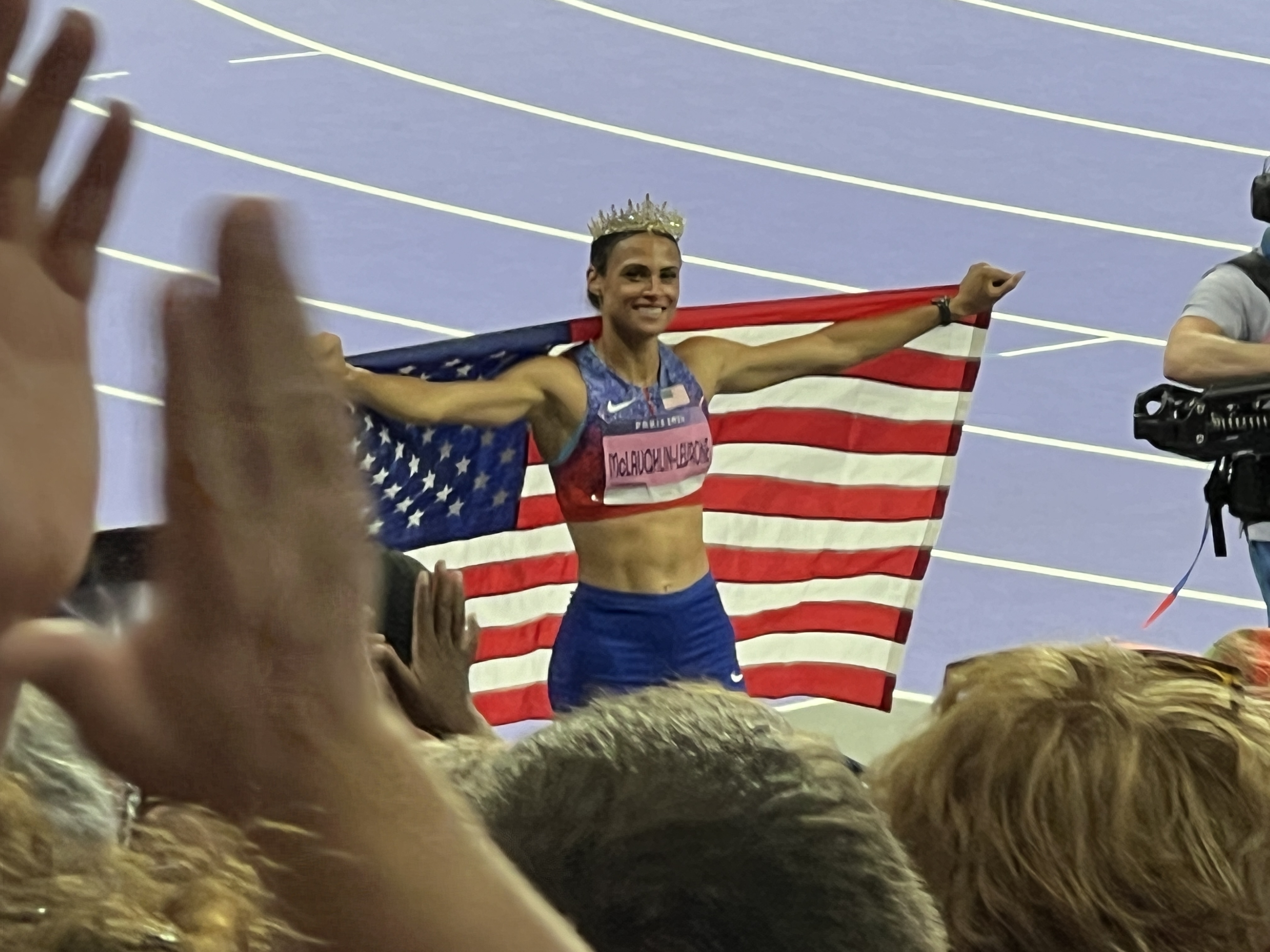
- Sydney McLaughlin-Levrone of the United States after breaking the world record in the final
- Venue: Stade de France; Saint-Denis, France
- Dates: 4 August 2024 (round 1); 5 August 2024 (repechage round); 6 August 2024 (semi-finals); 8 August 2024 (final)
- Competitors: 40 from 25 nations
- Winning time: 50.37 s WR

Medalists
1st place, gold medalist(s)		Sydney McLaughlin-Levrone	United States
2nd place, silver medalist(s)		Anna Cockrell	United States
3rd place, bronze medalist(s)		Femke Bol	Netherlands

The women's 400 metres hurdles at the 2024 Summer Olympics was held over four rounds at the Stade de France in Saint-Denis, France, from 4 to 8 August 2024. This was the eleventh time that this event was contested at the Summer Olympics. Forty athletes from twenty-five nations qualified by entry standard or ranking.

The final was won by Sydney McLaughlin-Levrone of the United States in a world record of 50.37 seconds, followed by Anna Cockrell of the United States in second place in 51.87 s and Femke Bol of the Netherlands in third place in 52.15 s.

== Background ==
The women's 400 metres hurdles was first introduced at the 1984 Summer Olympics in Los Angeles, United States and was contested ten times at the Summer Olympics before 2024: every four years, although the 2020 edition was postponed to 2021 due to the COVID-19 pandemic. That year, Sydney McLaughlin-Levrone from the United States won the event in a world and Olympic record of 51.46 seconds. Since then, McLaughlin-Levrone lowered her world record three times, most recently at the 2024 U.S. Olympic Trials, where she ran a time of 50.65 seconds.

Global records before the 2024 Summer Olympics
Record	Athlete (nation)	Time	Location	Date
World record	Sydney McLaughlin-Levrone (USA)	50.65	Eugene, United States	30 June 2024
Olympic record	Sydney McLaughlin (USA) (Note: Sydney McLaughlin was the maiden name of Sydney McLaughlin-Levrone.)	51.46	Tokyo, Japan	4 August 2021
World leading	Sydney McLaughlin-Levrone (USA)	50.65	Eugene, United States	30 June 2024

Area records before the 2024 Summer Olympics
Record	Athlete (nation)	Time
African record	Nezha Bidouane (MAR)|	52.90
Asian record	Kemi Adekoya (BHR)	53.09
European records	Femke Bol (NED)	50.95
North, Central American and Caribbean record	Sydney McLaughlin (USA)	50.65 WR
Oceanian records	Debbie Flintoff-King (AUS)	53.17
South American records	Gianna Woodruff (PAN)	53.69

== Qualification ==
For the women's 400 metres hurdles event, the qualification period was between 1 July 2023 and 30 June 2024. Forty athletes were able to qualify for the event, with a maximum of three athletes per nation, by running the entry standard of 54.85 seconds or faster or by their World Athletics Ranking for this event.

== Results ==
=== Round 1 ===
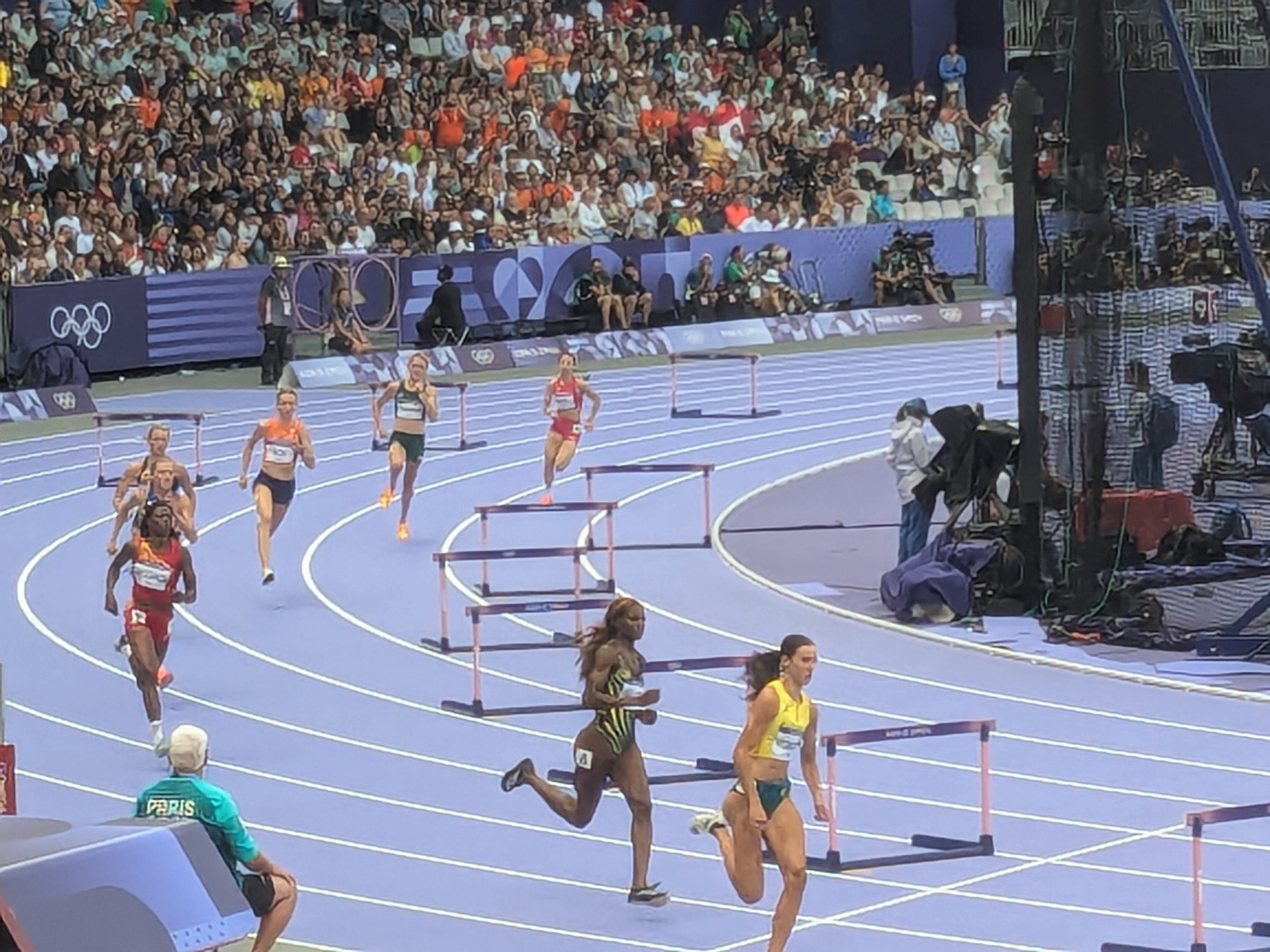
Athletes in the first bend of the third heat of round 1

Forty athletes from twenty-five nations competed in the five heats of round 1 on 4 August, starting at 12:35 (UTC+2) in the afternoon. The first three athletes in each heat (Q) and the next three fastest athletes overall (q) qualified for the semi-finials, all others finishers advanced to the repechage round.

Results of round 1
Rank	Heat	Lane	Athlete	Nation	Time	Notes
1	3	4	Femke Bol	Netherlands	53.38	Q
2	2	5	Jasmine Jones	United States	53.60	Q
3	5	3	Sydney McLaughlin-Levrone	United States	53.60	Q
4	4	8	Anna Cockrell	United States	53.91	Q
5	3	8	Shiann Salmon	Jamaica	53.95	Q
6	1	7	Rushell Clayton	Jamaica	54.32	Q
7	2	9	Rogail Joseph	South Africa	54.56	Q, PB
8	4	7	Lina Nielsen	Great Britain	54.65	Q
9	4	4	Janieve Russell	Jamaica	54.67	Q
10	3	3	Zenéy Geldenhuys	South Africa	54.73	Q
11	1	3	Fatoumata Binta Diallo	Portugal	54.75	Q
12	2	3	Savannah Sutherland	Canada	54.80	Q
13	4	9	Hanne Claes	Belgium	54.80	q, SB
14	1	5	Amalie Iuel	Norway	54.82	Q
15	1	8	Cathelijn Peeters	Netherlands	54.84	q
16	2	2	Paulien Couckuyt	Belgium	54.90	q, SB
17	2	8	Gianna Woodruff	Panama	54.94	SB
18	2	7	Ayomide Folorunso	Italy	55.03	
19	3	6	Anna Ryzhykova	Ukraine	55.13	
20	5	4	Noura Ennadi	Morocco	55.26	Q
21	5	5	Louise Maraval	France	55.32	Q
22	3	5	Jessie Knight	Great Britain	55.39	
23	3	2	Jiadie Mo	China	55.43	
24	5	6	Yasmin Giger	Switzerland	55.44	
25	4	5	Nikoleta Jíchová	Czech Republic	55.45	
26	3	9	Alanah Yukich	Australia	55.46	
27	1	9	Naomi Van den Broeck	Belgium	55.51	
28	5	2	Alice Muraro	Italy	55.62	
29	3	7	Linda Angounou	Cameroon	55.69	NR
30	1	6	Rebecca Sartori	Italy	55.81	
31	5	7	Sarah Carli	Australia	55.92	
32	4	3	Grace Claxton	Puerto Rico	56.29	
33	1	4	Chayenne da Silva	Brazil	56.52	
34	4	2	Viivi Lehikoinen	Finland	56.67	
35	2	6	Shana Grebo	France	56.70	
36	5	8	Line Kloster	Norway	57.69	
37	4	6	Lauren Hoffman	Philippines	57.84	
38	5	9	Viktoriya Tkachuk	Ukraine	58.10	SB
39	2	4	Carolina Krafzik	Germany	58.49	
	1	2	Kemi Adekoya	Bahrain	DNS	

=== Repechage round ===
Twenty-one athletes from seventeen nations competed in the repechage round on 5 August, starting at 10:50 (UTC+2) in the morning. The first two athletes in each heat (Q) qualified for the semi-finals.

Results of the repechage round
Rank	Heat	Lane	Athlete	Nation	Time	Notes
1	2	5	Jiadie Mo	China	54.75	Q, PB
2	3	7	Shana Grebo	France	54.91	Q
3	3	8	Anna Ryzhykova	Ukraine	54.95	Q, =SB
4	1	4	Ayomide Folorunso	Italy	55.07	Q
5	3	2	Linda Angounou	Cameroon	55.09	NR
6	2	3	Jessie Knight	Great Britain	55.10 (.093)	Q
7	2	2	Gianna Woodruff	Panama	55.10 (.098)	
8 (Note: Since Van den Broeck and Yukich had the exact same time, both advanced to the semi-finals.)	1	7	Naomi Van den Broeck	Belgium	55.11 (.107)	Q
8	1	3	Alanah Yukich	Australia	55.11 (.107)	Q, PB
10	3	4	Sarah Carli	Australia	55.12	
11	3	3	Yasmin Giger	Switzerland	55.18	
12	2	6	Nikoleta Jíchová	Czech Republic	55.31	
13	2	7	Rebecca Sartori	Italy	55.44	
14	3	6	Alice Muraro	Italy	55.48	
15	1	6	Grace Claxton	Puerto Rico	55.94	
16	2	4	Carolina Krafzik	Germany	56.02	
17	2	8	Chayenne da Silva	Brazil	56.56	
18	1	5	Line Kloster	Norway	56.73	
19	1	2	Viivi Lehikoinen	Finland	58.04	
20	3	5	Lauren Hoffman	Philippines	58.28	
21	1	8	Viktoriya Tkachuk	Ukraine	59.40	

=== Semi-finals ===
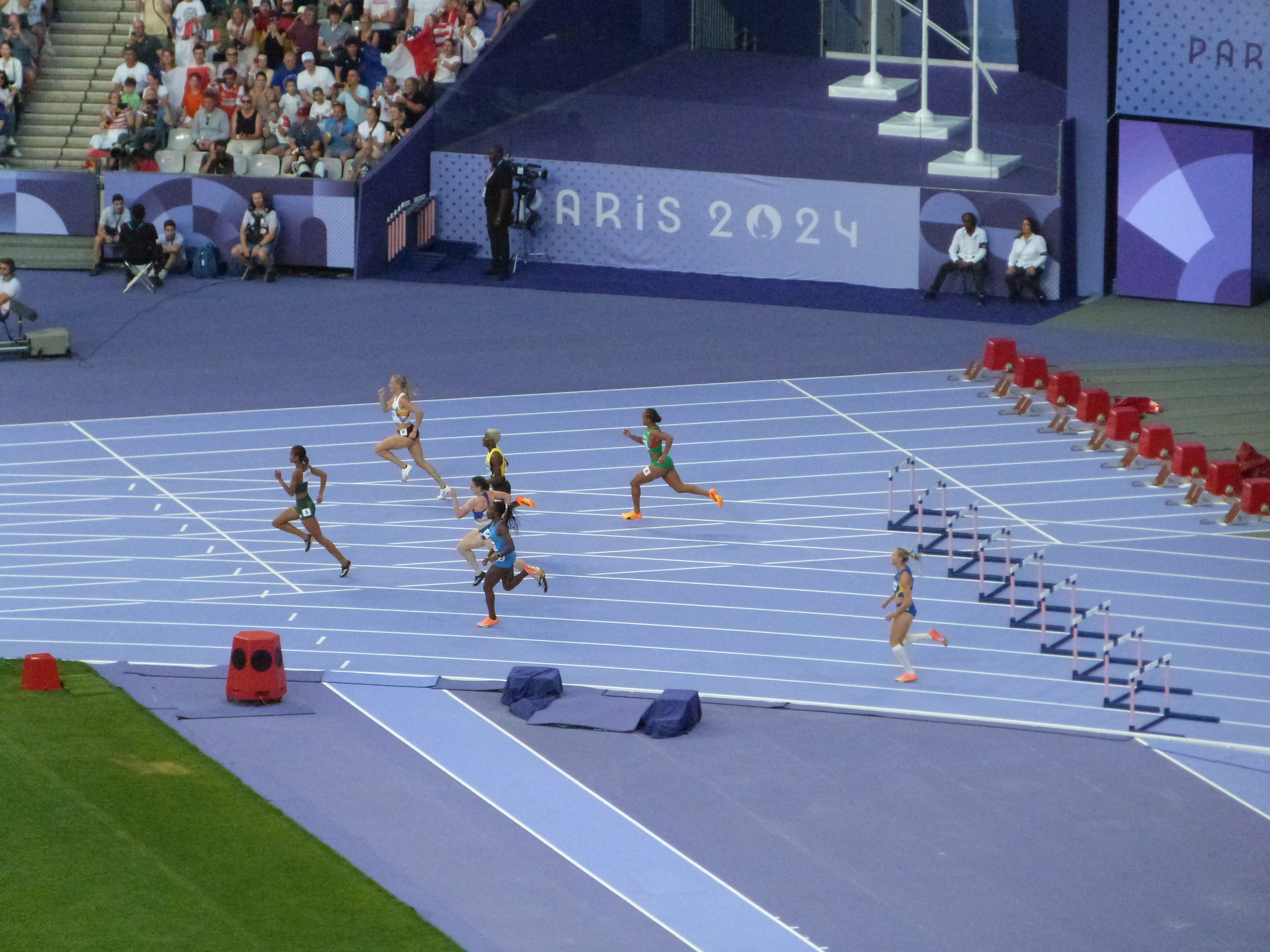
Second heat of the semi-finals

Twenty-five athletes from fifteen nations competed in the three heats of the semi-finals on 6 August, starting at 20:07 (UTC+2) in the evening. The first two athletes in each heat (Q) and the next two fastest athletes overall (q) qualified for the final.

Results of the semi-finals
Rank	Heat	Lane	Athlete	Nation	Time	Notes
1	2	7	Sydney McLaughlin-Levrone	United States	52.13	Q
2	3	6	Femke Bol	Netherlands	52.57	Q
3	3	7	Anna Cockrell	United States	52.90	Q
4	1	5	Rushell Clayton	Jamaica	53.00	Q
5	3	5	Shiann Salmon	Jamaica	53.13	q, PB
6	3	4	Savannah Sutherland	Canada	53.80	q
7	1	7	Jasmine Jones	United States	53.83	Q
8	2	4	Louise Maraval	France	53.83	Q
9	1	8	Zenéy Geldenhuys	South Africa	53.90	PB
10	2	5	Rogail Joseph	South Africa	54.12	PB
11	3	9	Paulien Couckuyt	Belgium	54.64	SB
12	2	6	Janieve Russell	Jamaica	54.65	
13	1	3	Shana Grebo	France	54.84	
14	1	4	Amalie Iuel	Norway	54.88	
15	3	3	Jessie Knight	Great Britain	54.90	
16	2	3	Ayomide Folorunso	Italy	54.92	
17	2	8	Fatoumata Binta Diallo	Portugal	54.93	
18	1	2	Naomi Van den Broeck	Belgium	54.94	
19	1	9	Cathelijn Peeters	Netherlands	55.20	
20	3	1	Alanah Yukich	Australia	55.49	
21	3	8	Noura Ennadi	Morocco	55.50	
22	3	2	Jiadie Mo	China	55.63	
23	2	2	Anna Ryzhykova	Ukraine	55.65	
24	2	9	Hanne Claes	Belgium	55.96	
25	1	6	Lina Nielsen	Great Britain	1:31.22	

=== Final ===
The final was held on 8 August, starting at 21:25 (UTC+2) in the evening.

In the final, McLaughlin-Levrone went out fastest over the first hurdle with Jasmine Jones second. McLaughlin-Levrone continued conservatively for herself down the backstretch, gaining on Bol, who was in the lane immediately to her outside. By the 200, McLaughlin-Levrone had made up the stagger on Bol. McLaughlin-Levrone just continued to pull ahead to an insurmountable lead and successfully defended her Olympic title. Cockrell took the final hurdle smoothly, passing Bol, and surged ahead to run in for silver. Bol won her second consecutive Olympic bronze medal in this event.

McLaughlin-Levrone set a new world record at 50.37. Anna Cockrell became the #4 performer with her 51.87, the 13th fastest performance in history (behind 7 by McLaughlin-Levrone, 4 by Bol, and Muhammad's Olympic silver medal). Bol's 52.15 was only her 8th best but was #19 in history. In fourth, Jasmine Jones became the #5 performer in history. Fifth place Rushell Clayton became #13. The top four would have won any Olympics before 2020.

The final was the fastest women's 400-meter hurdles race in Olympic history collectively: five of the eight women ran under 52.7 seconds, with these times ranking among the top 11 in Olympic history. The winning margin was 1.50 seconds - the greatest winning margin for the women's 400 metres hurdles at any Olympics.

Results of the final
Rank	Lane	Athlete	Nation	Time	Notes
1st place, gold medalist(s)	5	Sydney McLaughlin-Levrone	United States	50.37	WR
2nd place, silver medalist(s)	7	Anna Cockrell	United States	51.87	PB
3rd place, bronze medalist(s)	6	Femke Bol	Netherlands	52.15	
4	9	Jasmine Jones	United States	52.29	PB
5	8	Rushell Clayton	Jamaica	52.68	
6	2	Shiann Salmon	Jamaica	53.29	
7	3	Savannah Sutherland	Canada	53.88	
8	4	Louise Maraval	France	54.53	
