= Athletics at the 2019 Summer Universiade – Women's 400 metres hurdles =

The women's 400 metres hurdles event at the 2019 Summer Universiade was held on 8, 9 and 10 July at the Stadio San Paolo in Naples.

== Medalists ==
Gold	Silver	Bronze
Ayomide Folorunso; Italy	Zeney van der Walt; South Africa	Amalie Iuel; Norway

== Results ==
=== Heats ===
Qualification: First 3 in each heat (Q) and next 4 fastest (q) qualified for the semifinals.

Rank	Heat	Name	Nationality	Time	Notes
1	4	Ayomide Folorunso	Italy	56.23	Q
2	4	Mariia Mykolenko	Ukraine	56.76	Q, SB
3	3	Zeney van der Walt	South Africa	57.49	Q
4	1	Amalie Iuel	Norway	57.50	Q
5	2	Djamila Böhm	Germany	57.66	Q
6	4	Marlene Santos	Brazil	57.66	Q
7	1	Christine Salterberg	Germany	57.77	Q
8	2	Rogail Joseph	South Africa	57.88	Q
9	4	Daniela Rojas	Costa Rica	57.89	q, SB
10	1	Genevieve Cowie	Australia	57.91	Q
11	2	Mackenzie Keenan	New Zealand	58.86	Q
12	3	Daniela Ledecká	Slovakia	59.12	Q
13	3	Ida Šimunčić	Croatia	59.42	Q
14	2	Alena Hrušoci	Croatia	59.54	q
15	3	Johanna Holmen Svensson	Sweden	59.83	q
16	2	Drita Islami	North Macedonia	59.96	q
17	1	Anna Percy	New Zealand	1:00.68	
18	1	Annemarie Nissen	Denmark	1:00.79	SB
19	3	Martina Hofmanová	Czech Republic	1:00.88	
20	3	Liis Roose	Estonia	1:00.90	
21	3	Imane Ennakhli	Morocco	1:01.88	
22	2	Marielle Kleemeier	Estonia	1:01.93	SB
23	4	Adelina Akhmetova	Kazakhstan	1:01.97	
24	4	Gala Trajkovič	Slovenia	1:03.23	
25	4	Abayarathna Subahani	Sri Lanka	1:04.80	
26	1	Marina Fenianos	Lebanon	1:11.28	
	1	Hanna Palmqvist	Sweden	DQ	R168.7
	2	Smenesh Taye	Ethiopia	DNS	

=== Semifinals ===
Qualification: First 3 in each heat (Q) and next 2 fastest (q) qualified for the final.

Rank	Heat	Name	Nationality	Time	Notes
1	2	Ayomide Folorunso	Italy	55.41	Q
2	1	Amalie Iuel	Norway	55.99	Q
3	1	Zeney van der Walt	South Africa	56.15	Q
4	2	Mariia Mykolenko	Ukraine	56.40	Q, SB
5	1	Christine Salterberg	Germany	56.86	Q, SB
6	1	Daniela Ledecká	Slovakia	56.95	q
7	2	Djamila Böhm	Germany	57.18	Q
8	2	Rogail Joseph	South Africa	57.34	q
9	1	Genevieve Cowie	Australia	57.91	
10	2	Marlene Santos	Brazil	57.99	
11	1	Alena Hrušoci	Croatia	58.22	
12	1	Mackenzie Keenan	New Zealand	58.22	
13	2	Daniela Rojas	Costa Rica	58.49	SB
14	2	Ida Šimunčić	Croatia	59.12	
15	2	Drita Islami	North Macedonia	59.20	NR
16	1	Johanna Holmen Svensson	Sweden	59.68	

=== Final ===
Official Video

Rank	Lane	Name	Nationality	Time	Notes
1st place, gold medalist(s)	4	Ayomide Folorunso	Italy	54.75	SB
2nd place, silver medalist(s)	5	Zeney van der Walt	South Africa	55.73	SB
3rd place, bronze medalist(s)	6	Amalie Iuel	Norway	56.13	
4	3	Mariia Mykolenko	Ukraine	56.55	
5	2	Daniela Ledecká	Slovakia	57.07	
6	7	Djamila Böhm	Germany	57.59	
7	8	Christine Salterberg	Germany	58.12	
8	1	Rogail Joseph	South Africa	59.07	
