= Linda Angounou =

Cameroonian athlete (born 1992)

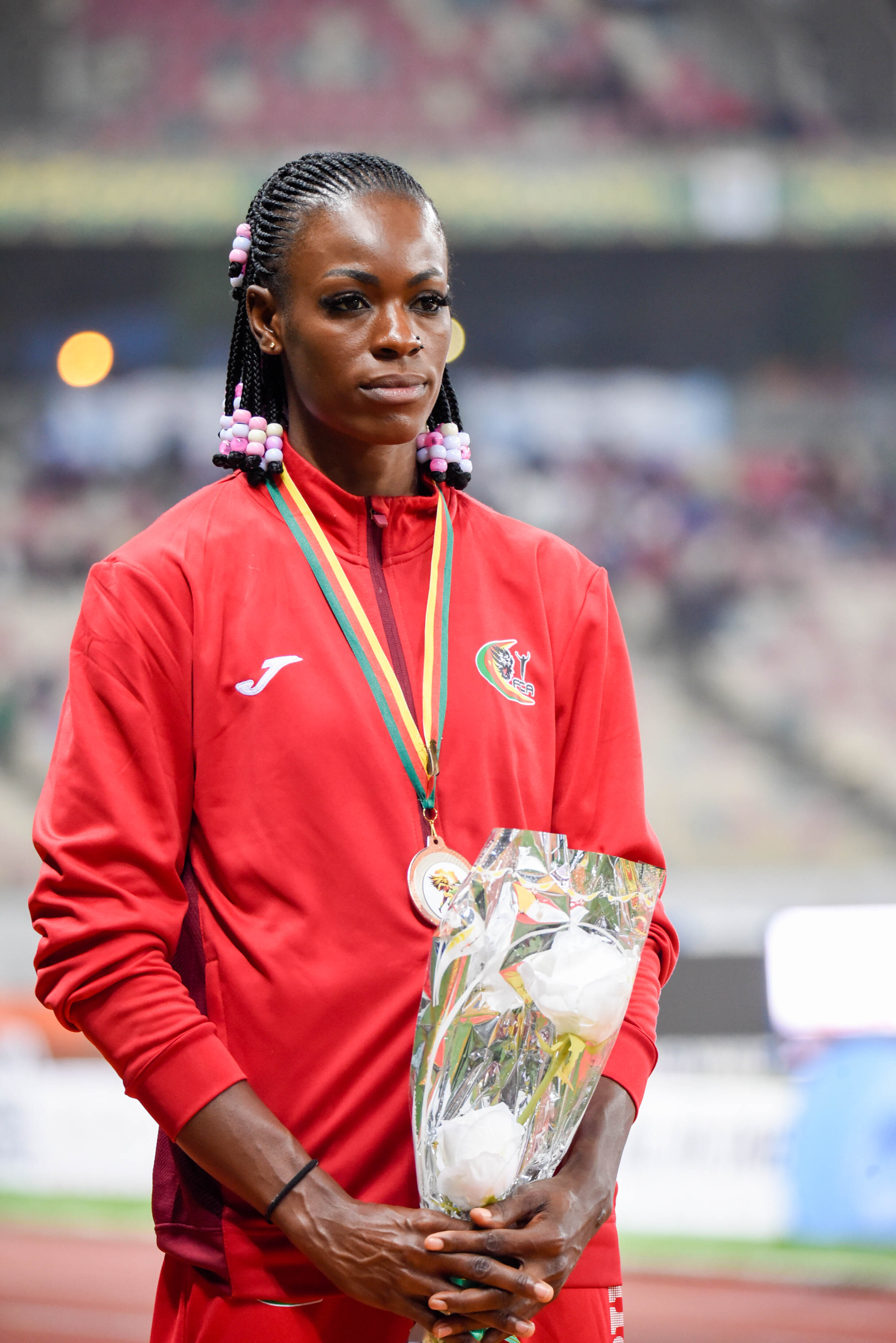
- Angounou in 2024

Personal information
- Full name: Linda Christelle Angounou Ngouayaka
- Nationality: Cameroonian
- Born: 23 September 1992 (age 33)

Sport
- Sport: Athletics
- Event: Hurdles

Achievements and titles
- Personal bests: 400m hurdles: 55.94 (Troyes, 2023) NR
Medal record
Women's athletics
Representing Cameroon
African Championships
Bronze medal – third place	2024 Douala	400 m hurdles
Bronze medal – third place	2026 Accra	400 m hurdles
African Games
Bronze medal – third place	2023 Accra	400 m hurdles
Islamic Solidarity Games
Bronze medal – third place	2021 Konya	400 m hurdles
Bronze medal – third place	2025 Riyadh	400 m hurdles
Jeux de la Francophonie
Silver medal – second place	2023 Kinshasa	400m hurdles
Gold medal – first place	2023 Kinshasa	4x100 m relay
Silver medal – second place	2023 Kinshasa	4x400 m relay

Linda Christelle Angounou Ngouayaka (born 23 September 1992) is a Cameroonian hurdler. She is the national record holder over 400 metres hurdles.

== Biography ==
In 2022, Angounou finished fourth in the 400 metres hurdles final at the 2022 African Championships in Mauritius. She competed at the 2022 Commonwealth Games in Birmingham.

She won the bronze medal 400 metres hurdles at the 2021 Islamic Solidarity Games in August 2022, in Konya, Turkey.

In July 2023, she set a personal best and national record over the 400m hurdles in Troyes, running 55.94 seconds.

She won silver in the 400m hurdles at the Francophone Games in Kinshasa in August 2023. At the same games, she won gold with the Cameroon women's 4 × 100 m relay team, and silver with the women's 4 × 400 m relay team.

She won bronze at the delayed 2023 African Games in Accra in the 400m hurdles in March 2024, running 56.41 seconds. She competed in the 400 metres hurdles at the 2024 Summer Olympics in Paris in August 2024.

In May, she again won the bronze medal at the 2026 African Championships in Athletics in Accra, Ghana. She competed in the 400 metres hurdles at the 2026 Commonwealth Games in Glasgow, Scotland.
