= 2022 African Championships in Athletics – Women's 4 × 400 metres relay =

The women's 4 × 400 metres relay event at the 2022 African Championships in Athletics was held on 12 June in Port Louis, Mauritius.

== Results ==
Rank	Lane	Nation	Competitors	Time	Notes
1st place, gold medalist(s)	5	South Africa	Miranda Coetzee, Taylon Bieldt, Precious Molepo, Zenéy van der Walt	3:29.34	
2nd place, silver medalist(s)	6	Kenya	Jacinta Shikanda, Hellen Syombua, Joan Cherono, Veronica Mutua	3:35.55	
3rd place, bronze medalist(s)	4	Nigeria	Deborah Oke, Queen Usunobun, Ella Onojuvwewo, Patience Okon George	3:36.24	
4	7	Botswana	Christine Botlogetswe, ?, Thomphang Basele, Lydia Jele	3:36.96	
5	2	Ethiopia	Amarech Zago, Msgana Haylu, Gebeyanesh Gedecha, Tsige Duguma	3:47.31	
	3	Zambia		DNS	
