= Noura Ennadi =

Moroccan athlete (born 1999)

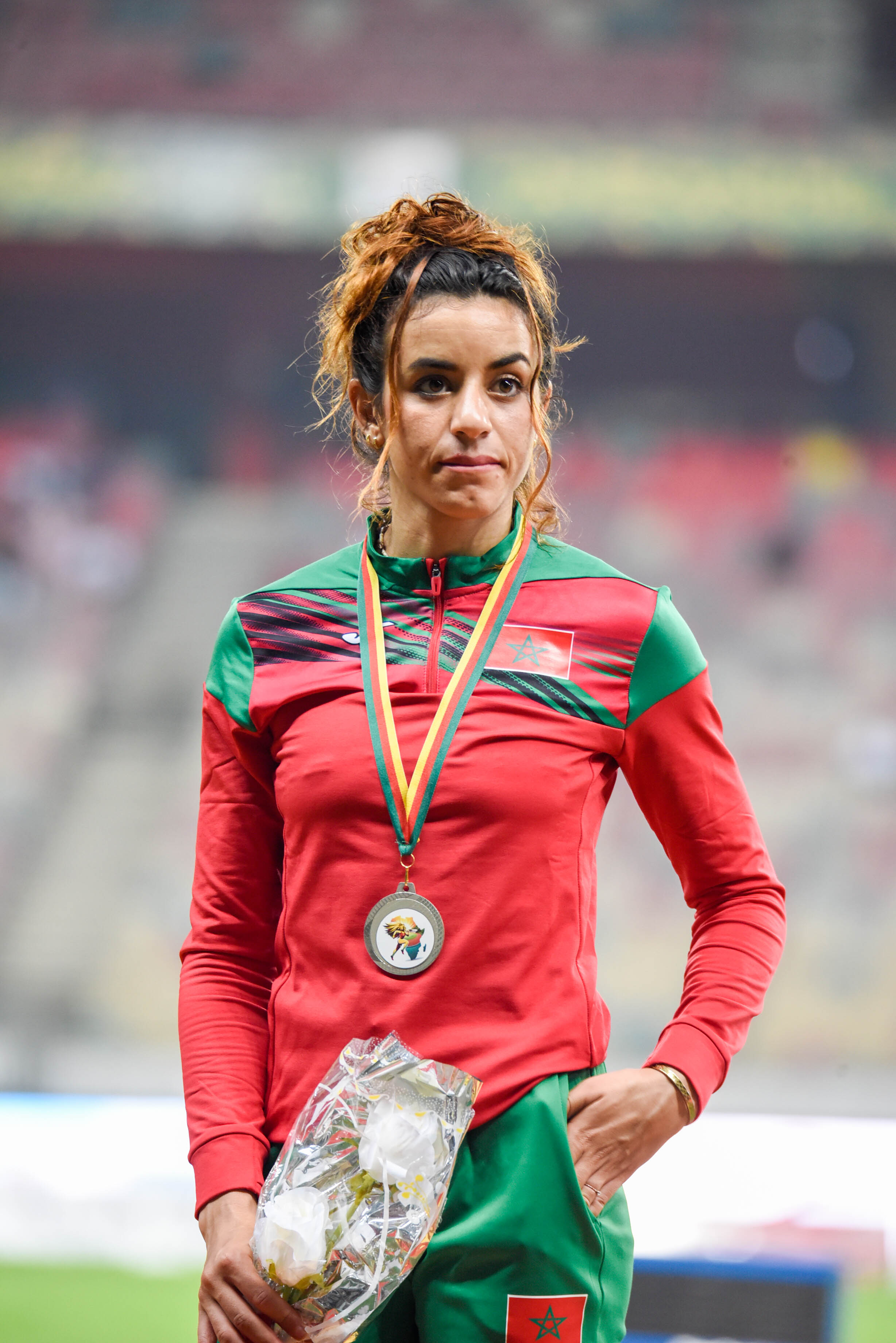
- Ennadi in 2024

Personal information
- Nationality: Morocco
- Born: 5 April 1999 (age 27)

Sport
- Sport: Athletics
- Event: 400m hurdles

Achievements and titles
- Personal bests: 400m hurdles 48.37 (Madrid, 2023)
Medal record
Women's athletics
Representing Morocco
African Games
Silver medal – second place	2023 Accra	400 m hurdles
African Championships
Silver medal – second place	2024 Douala	400 m hurdles
Bronze medal – third place	2022 Saint Pierre	400 m hurdles
Mediterranean Games
Bronze medal – third place	2022 Oran	400 m hurdles
Islamic Solidarity Games
Gold medal – first place	2021 Konya	400 m hurdles
Bronze medal – third place	2021 Konya	4 x 400 m relay
Jeux de la Francophonie
Gold medal – first place	2023 Kinshasa	400 m hurdles
Arab Championships
Silver medal – second place	2023 Algiers	400m hurdles
Bronze medal – third place	2023 Algiers	100m hurdles

Noura Ennadi (born 5 April 1999) is a Moroccan track and field athlete who competes over 400m hurdles.

== Biography ==
Ennadi won the 400 metres hurdles at the 2021 Islamic Solidarity Games in August 2022, in Konya, Turkey. That month, she was also a bronze medalist at the 2022 African Championships in Mauritius.

Ennadi set a new personal best time of 54.37 in Madrid in July 2023. She won the 400m hurdles at the Francophone Games in Kinshasa on 4 August 2023. Selected for the 2023 World Athletics Championships in Budapest in August 2023, she qualified for the semi-finals.

She won a silver medal in the 400m hurdles race at the 2023 African Games in Accra in March 2024 in 55.85. She competed in the 400 metres hurdles at the 2024 Summer Olympics in Paris in August 2024, where she reached the semi-finals.
