= 2026 African Championships in Athletics – Women's 400 metres hurdles =

women's 400 metres hurdles at the 2026 African Championships in Athletics
- Venue: Legon Sports Stadium
- Location: Accra, Ghana
- Dates: 16–17 May
- Winning time: 54.74

Medalists
gold medal	Rogail Joseph	South Africa
silver medal	Dinedye Denis	Ivory Coast
bronze medal	Linda Angounou	Cameroon

The women's 400 metres hurdles event at the 2026 African Championships in Athletics was held on 16 and 17 May in Accra, Ghana.

== Results ==
=== Heats ===
First 3 of each heat (Q) and the next 2 fastest (q) qualified for the final.

Rank	Heat	Athlete	Nationality	Time	Notes
1	2	Rogail Joseph	South Africa	55.92	Q
2	2	Dinedye Denis	Ivory Coast	55.94	Q
3	2	Linda Angounou	Cameroon	56.10	Q
4	1	Ashley Miller	Zimbabwe	57.13	Q
4	1	Derartu Anota	Ethiopia	57.13	Q
6	2	Banchiayehu Tesema	Ethiopia	57.54	q
7	1	Samira Awali Boubacar	Niger	57.75	Q
8	1	Emebet Teketel	Ethiopia	58.92	q
9	2	Gladys Ngure	Kenya	1:00.04	
	1	Sita Sibiri	Burkina Faso	DNS	
	1	Flora Kivoutoukila	Republic of the Congo	DNS	

=== Final ===
Rank	Heat	Athlete	Nationality	Time	Notes
1st place, gold medalist(s)	4	Rogail Joseph	South Africa	54.74	
2nd place, silver medalist(s)	3	Dinedye Denis	Ivory Coast	55.16	
3rd place, bronze medalist(s)	2	Linda Angounou	Cameroon	56.25	
4	5	Ashley Miller	Zimbabwe	56.26	
5	1	Banchiayehu Tesema	Ethiopia	56.90	
6	6	Derartu Anota	Ethiopia	58.21	
7	8	Emebet Teketel	Ethiopia	58.57	
	7	Samira Awali Boubacar	Niger	DNS	
