= 2022 African Championships in Athletics – Women's 400 metres hurdles =

The women's 400 metres hurdles event at the 2022 African Championships in Athletics was held on 11 and 12 June in Port Louis, Mauritius.

== Medalists ==
Gold	Silver	Bronze
Zenéy van der Walt; South Africa	Taylon Bieldt; South Africa	Noura Ennadi; Morocco

== Results ==
=== Heats ===
Qualification: First 3 of each heat (Q) and the next 2 fastest (q) qualified for the final.

Rank	Heat	Name	Nationality	Time	Notes
1	2	Taylon Bieldt	South Africa	56.97	Q
2	1	Zenéy van der Walt	South Africa	57.27	Q
3	2	Wenda Nel	South Africa	57.52	Q
4	2	Noura Ennadi	Morocco	57.81	Q
5	2	Linda Angounou	Cameroon	58.71	q
6	1	Jane Chege	Kenya	58.89	Q
7	1	Joy Abu	Nigeria	58.94	Q
8	2	Mariam Bance	Burkina Faso	59.00	q
9	2	Sarah Ochigbo	Nigeria	59.77	
10	1	Kemi Petersen	Nigeria	1:01.07	
11	1	Sita Sibiri	Burkina Faso	1:01.17	

=== Final ===
Rank	Lane	Athlete	Nationality	Time	Notes
1st place, gold medalist(s)	6	Zenéy van der Walt	South Africa	56.00	
2nd place, silver medalist(s)	5	Taylon Bieldt	South Africa	56.67	
3rd place, bronze medalist(s)	7	Noura Ennadi	Morocco	58.06	
4	1	Linda Angounou	Cameroon	58.97	
5	2	Mariam Bance	Burkina Faso	59.42	
6	4	Jane Chege	Kenya	59.71	
7	3	Wenda Nel	South Africa	1:00.43	
8	8	Joy Abu	Nigeria	1:00.84	
