= Georgina Toth =

Hungarian-born naturalized Cameroonian hammer thrower (born 1982)

Personal information
- Nationality: Hungary; Cameroon
- Born: Georgina Tóth; March 10, 1982 (age 44) Dunaújváros, Fejér, Hungary

Sport
- Country: Cameroon
- Sport: Athletics
- Event(s): Hammer throw, Weight throw
- College team: NAU Lumberjacks
- Retired: 2009

Achievements and titles
- Olympic finals: 2008 Summer Olympics
- Regional finals: 2008 African Athletics Championships: 4th place
- Personal bests: 4 kg Hammer throw: 67.42 m (2008, NR); 9.3 kg Weight throw: 19.69 m (2009)

Georgina Toth (born March 10, 1982) is a Hungarian-born naturalized Cameroonian hammer thrower. Toth has dual citizenship in Hungary and Cameroon, and competed for Cameroon at the 2008 Summer Olympics.

Toth attended Northern Arizona University in Flagstaff, Arizona, where she competed on the women's track and field team, and graduated in 2009 with a bachelor's degree in business administration-finance and marketing.

Internationally, she finished fourth at the 16th 2008 African Championships in Athletics. Toth holds the national record for Hungary and Cameroon in the weight throw with 19.69 m (64 ft 7 in), and the national record for Cameroon in the hammer throw with 67.42 m (221 ft 2 1/4 in).
