= Athletics at the 2021 Islamic Solidarity Games =

Athletics competition

- Venue: Konya Athletic Field
- Dates: 8–12 August 2022
- Competitors: 468 from 50 nations

The athletics competition at the 2021 Islamic Solidarity Games was held in Konya, Turkey from 8 to 12 August 2022 in Konya Athletic Field. The Para Athletics competitions will be held in Konya Athletic Field on 11 August 2022. Countries can compete with a maximum of 2 athletes in each disability class (T46/T47 & T53/T54) in Para Athletics competitions. Men: High Jump T46/T47 Women: 100m T53/T54

The Games were originally scheduled to take place from 20 to 29 August 2021. In May 2020, the Islamic Solidarity Sports Federation (ISSF), who are responsible for the direction and control of the Islamic Solidarity Games, postponed the games as the 2020 Summer Olympics were postponed to July and August 2021, due to the global COVID-19 pandemic.

The competition was held at an altitude of over 1,000 metres which is said to increase performance in explosive events like sprinting and horizontal jumps.

All electronic time results during the first three days of competition have been cancelled because of wrong chronometre parameters but the order of medals still remains.

== Medal table ==
* Host nation (Turkey)

| Rank | Nation | Gold | Silver | Bronze | Total |
|---|---|---|---|---|---|
| 1 | Turkey (TUR)* | 13 | 10 | 6 | 29 |
| 2 | Bahrain (BHR) | 8 | 7 | 4 | 19 |
| 3 | Morocco (MAR) | 4 | 3 | 7 | 14 |
| 4 | Uzbekistan (UZB) | 4 | 2 | 2 | 8 |
| 5 | Qatar (QAT) | 3 | 3 | 1 | 7 |
| 6 | The Gambia (GAM) | 2 | 0 | 0 | 2 |
| 7 | Azerbaijan (AZE) | 1 | 2 | 0 | 3 |
| 8 | Algeria (ALG) | 1 | 1 | 4 | 6 |
| 9 | Cameroon (CMR) | 1 | 0 | 2 | 3 |
| 9 | Ivory Coast (CIV) | 1 | 0 | 2 | 3 |
| 9 | Kuwait (KUW) | 1 | 0 | 2 | 3 |
| 9 | Oman (OMA) | 1 | 0 | 2 | 3 |
| 13 | Kazakhstan (KAZ) | 1 | 0 | 1 | 2 |
| 14 | Burkina Faso (BUR) | 1 | 0 | 0 | 1 |
| 14 | Pakistan (PAK) | 1 | 0 | 0 | 1 |
| 16 | Saudi Arabia (KSA) | 0 | 4 | 1 | 5 |
| 17 | Djibouti (DJI) | 0 | 1 | 1 | 2 |
| 17 | Iran (IRI) | 0 | 1 | 1 | 2 |
| 17 | Senegal (SEN) | 0 | 1 | 1 | 2 |
| 17 | Uganda (UGA) | 0 | 1 | 1 | 2 |
| 21 | Sudan (SUD) | 0 | 1 | 0 | 1 |
| 21 | Tajikistan (TJK) | 0 | 1 | 0 | 1 |
| 21 | Togo (TOG) | 0 | 1 | 0 | 1 |
| 24 | Indonesia (INA) | 0 | 0 | 2 | 2 |
| 24 | Malaysia (MAS) | 0 | 0 | 2 | 2 |
| Totals (25 entries) | | 43 | 39 | 42 | 124 |

== Medalists ==
=== Men ===
| Event | Gold | | Silver | | Bronze | |
|---|---|---|---|---|---|---|
| 100 metres (wind: +1.7 m/s) | Arthur Cissé; Ivory Coast | 9.89 IRM | Abdullah Abkar Mohammed; Saudi Arabia | 9.95 IRM | Barakat Al-Harthi; Oman Emre Zafer Barnes; Turkey | 9.99 IRM |
| 200 metres (wind: +3.7 m/s) | Emmanuel Eseme; Cameroon | 20.16 | Ramil Guliyev; Turkey | 20.24 | Chakir Machmour; Morocco | 20.63 |
| 400 metres | Mikhail Litvin; Kazakhstan | 45.36 IRM | Yousef Masrahi; Saudi Arabia | 45.80 IRM | Mazen Al-Yassin; Saudi Arabia | 45.95 IRM |
| 800 metres | Abubaker Haydar Abdalla; Qatar | 1:47.59 IRM | Sadam Koumi; Sudan | 1:48.14 IRM | Hafid Rizqy; Morocco | 1:48.22 IRM |
| 1500 metres | Abdelatif Sadiki; Morocco | 3:54.40 | Abdirahman Saeed Hassan; Qatar | 3:54.46 | Salim Keddar; Algeria | 3:54.72 |
| 5000 metres | Birhanu Balew; Bahrain | 13:51.64 IRM | Mohamed Fares; Morocco | 13:54.02 IRM | Abel Chebet; Uganda | 13:54.93 IRM |
| 10,000 metres | Dawit Fikadu; Bahrain | 28:31.14 IRM | Abel Chebet; Uganda | 28:31.39 IRM | Mumin Gala; Djibouti | 28:33.01 IRM |
| 110 metres hurdles (wind: +2.1 m/s) | Amine Bouanani; Algeria | 13.21 IRM | Louis François Mendy; Senegal | 13.28 IRM | Yaqoub Al-Youha; Kuwait | 13.30 IRM |
| 400 metres hurdles | Bassem Hemeida; Qatar | 48.67 IRM | Yasmani Copello; Turkey | 48.86 IRM | Abdelmalik Lahoulou; Algeria | 49.15 IRM |
| 3000 metres steeplechase | Abderrafia Bouassel; Morocco | 8:57.92 IRM | Mohamed Ismail Ibrahim; Djibouti | 8:58.92 IRM | Musab Adam Ali; Qatar | 9:02.53 IRM |
| 4 × 100 metres relay | Turkey (TUR); Emre Zafer Barnes; Jak Ali Harvey; Kayhan Özer; Ramil Guliyev; Ertan Özkan | 38.74 GR | Bahrain (BHR); Omar Ebrahim; Rashid Abdulraof; Salem Eid Yaqoob; Saeed Al-Khaldi | 39.01 | Oman (OMN); Alsaih Amman; Barakat Al-Harthi; Mohamed Obaid Al-Saadi; Ali̇ Al-Balushi | 39.21 |
| 4 × 400 metres relay | Morocco (MAR); Aymane El Haddaoui; Rachi̇d M'hamdi; Saad Hinti; Hamza Dair | 3:03.76 | Algeria (ALG); Miloud Laredj; Es Saddik Hammouni Anas; Abdennour Bendjemaa; Abdelmalik Lahoulou | 3:04.52 | Bahrain (BHR); Ali Khamis; Hussain Al-Dosari; Abbas Yusuf Ali; Musa Isah | 3:04.79 |
| High jump | Hamdi Ali; Qatar Fatak Bait Jaboob; Oman | 2.14 | Shared gold | | Mohamad Eizlan Dahalan; Malaysia | 2.14 |
| Pole vault | Ersu Şaşma; Turkey | 5.60 GR | Hussain Al-Hizam; Saudi Arabia | 5.40 | Majed Radhi Al-Sayed; Kuwait | 4.80 |
| Long jump | Anvar Anvarov; Uzbekistan | 8.01 | Ildar Akhmadiev; Tajikistan | 7.86 | Necati Er; Turkey | 7.83 w |
| Triple jump | Necati Er; Turkey | 16.73 | Alexis Copello; Azerbaijan | 16.40 | Faye Amath; Senegal | 16.16 |
| Shot put | Alperen Karahan; Turkey | 20.46 GR | Mohammed Tolo; Saudi Arabia | 20.12 | Abdelrahman Mahmoud; Bahrain | 19.44 |
| Discus throw | Essa Al-Zenkawi; Kuwait | 62.03 | Moaaz Mohamed Ibrahim; Qatar | 61.35 | Oussama Khennoussi; Algeria | 60.59 NR |
| Hammer throw | Suhrob Khodjaev; Uzbekistan | 71.87 | Eşref Apak; Turkey | 71.34 | Özkan Baltacı; Turkey | 68.90 |
| Javelin throw | Arshad Nadeem; Pakistan | 88.55 GR | Ahmed Magour; Qatar | 74.28 | Ali Fathi Ganji; Iran | 71.24 |

=== Women ===
| Event | Gold | | Silver | | Bronze | |
|---|---|---|---|---|---|---|
| 100 metres (wind: +1.1 m/s) | Edidiong Odiong; Bahrain | 11.03 IRM | Farzaneh Fasihi; Iran | 11.12 IRM | Maboundou Koné; Ivory Coast | 11.13 IRM |
| 200 metres (wind: +2.9 m/s) | Gina Bass; The Gambia | 22.63 | Edidiong Odiong; Bahrain | 22.77 | Maboundou Koné; Ivory Coast | 23.12 |
| 400 metres | Muna Mubarak; Bahrain | 52.97 IRM | Farida Solieva; Uzbekistan | 54.07 IRM | Sara El Hachimi; Morocco | 54.32 IRM |
| 800 metres | Ekaterina Guliyev; Turkey | 2:02.28 IRM | Soukaina Hajji; Morocco | 2:02.78 IRM | Assia Raziki; Morocco | 2:03.03 IRM |
| 1500 metres | Winfred Yavi; Bahrain | 4:14.35 GR | Ekaterina Guliyev; Turkey | 4:16.41 | Soukaina Hajji; Morocco | 4:16.65 |
| 5000 metres | Yasemin Can; Turkey | 16:23.1 | Bontu Rebitu; Bahrain | 16:33.6 | Ruth Jebet; Bahrain | 16:40.4 |
| 10,000 metres | Yasemin Can; Turkey | 32:34.33 IRM | Bontu Rebitu; Bahrain | 32:59.19 IRM | Ruth Jebet; Bahrain | 33:03.13 IRM |
| 100 metres hurdles (wind: +3.7 m/s) | Şevval Ayaz; Turkey | 13.21 | Naomi Akakpo; Togo | 13.40 | Emilia Nova; Indonesia | 13.59 |
| 400 metres hurdles | Noura Ennadi; Morocco | 56.15 IRM | Aminat Yusuf Jamal; Bahrain | 56.41 IRM | Angounou Christelle; Cameroon | 57.92 IRM |
| 3000 metres steeplechase | Winfred Yavi; Bahrain | 9:34:57 IRM | Tigest Mekonen; Bahrain | 9:50:14 IRM | Ikram Ouaaziz; Morocco | 9:57:18 IRM |
| 4 × 100 metres relay | The Gambia (GAM); Ola Buwaro; Wurrie Njadoe; Maimuna Jallou; Gina Bass | 43.83 GR | Bahrain (BHR); Fatima Mubarak; Edidiong Odiong; Aminat Yusuf Jamal; Hajar Al-Khaldi | 44.11 | Turkey (TUR); Simay Özçiftçi; Şevval Ayaz; Cansu Nimet Sayın; Elif Polat | 44.49 |
| 4 × 400 metres relay | Bahrain (BHR); Zenab Mahamat; Aminat Yusuf Jamal; Awtef Ahmed; Muna Mubarak | 3:33.65 | Turkey (TUR); Elif Polat; Ekaterina Guliyev; Büşra Yıldırım; Edanur Tulum | 3:35.24 | Morocco (MAR); Sara El Hachimi; Soukaina Hajji; Noura Ennadi; Assia Raziki | 3:35.86 |
| High jump | Safina Sadullayeva; Uzbekistan | 1.97 GR | Svetlana Radzivil; Uzbekistan | 1.87 | Kristina Ovchinnikova; Kazakhstan | 1.87 |
| Pole vault | Buse Arıkazan; Turkey Demet Parlak; Turkey | 4.00 | Shared gold | | Nor Sarah Adi; Malaysia | 3.90 |
| Long jump | Marthe Koala; Burkina Faso | 6.53 w | Tuğba Danışmaz; Turkey | 6.34 w | Roksana Khudoyarova; Uzbekistan | 6.32 |
| Triple jump | Sharifa Davronova; Uzbekistan | 14.30 w | Yekaterina Sariyeva; Azerbaijan | 14.12 w | Tuğba Danışmaz; Turkey | 13.95 w |
| Shot put | Emel Dereli; Turkey | 17.25 | Pınar Akyol; Turkey | 16.87 | Eki Febri Ekawati; Indonesia | 14.93 |
| Discus throw | Özlem Becerek; Turkey | 54.91 GR | Nurten Mermer; Turkey | 52.85 | Nora Monie; Cameroon | 50.19 |
| Hammer throw | Hanna Skydan; Azerbaijan | 70.23 | Kıvılcım Kaya; Turkey | 65.68 | Zouina Bouzebra; Algeria | 59.51 |
| Javelin throw | Esra Türkmen; Turkey | 57.46 | Eda Tuğsuz; Turkey | 56.59 | Nargiza Kuchkarova; Uzbekistan | 56.08 |

=== Mixed ===
| Event | Gold | | Silver | | Bronze | |
|---|---|---|---|---|---|---|
| 4 × 400 metres relay | Bahrain; Ali Khamis; Zenab Mahamat; Musa Isah; Muna Mubarak | 3:17.40 GR | Morocco; Rachid M’Hamdi; Sara El Hachimi; Hamza Dair; Assia Raziki | 3:20.29 NR | Turkey; Oğuzhan Kaya; Edanur Tulum; Sinan Ören; Büşra Yıldırım | 3:22.90 |

== Para athletics ==
=== Medal table ===
* Host nation (Turkey)

| Rank | Nation | Gold | Silver | Bronze | Total |
|---|---|---|---|---|---|
| 1 | Turkey (TUR)* | 1 | 2 | 1 | 4 |
| 2 | Uzbekistan (UZB) | 1 | 0 | 0 | 1 |
| 3 | Senegal (SEN) | 0 | 0 | 1 | 1 |
| Totals (3 entries) | | 2 | 2 | 2 | 6 |

=== Men para athletics ===
| Event | Gold | | Silver | | Bronze | |
|---|---|---|---|---|---|---|
| High jump T46-47 | Omadbek Khasanov; Uzbekistan | 1.91 | Abdullah Ilgaz; Turkey | 1.87 | Ba Abou; Senegal | 1.73 |

=== Women para athletics ===
| Event | Gold | | Silver | | Bronze | |
|---|---|---|---|---|---|---|
| 100 m T53-54 (wind: +3.3 m/s) | Zübeyde Süpürgeci; Turkey | 17.11 | Zeynep Acet; Turkey | 18.98 | Nurşah Usta; Turkey | 19.52 |

== Participating nations ==
=== Athletics ===
468 athletes from 50 countries participated:

1. Afghanistan (2)
2. Albania (1)
3. Algeria (13)
4. Azerbaijan (6)
5. Bahrain (28)
6. Bangladesh (3)
7. Burkina Faso (3)
8. Cameroon (10)
9. Chad (7)
10. Comoros (2)
11. Djibouti (8)
12. The Gambia (8)
13. Guinea (2)
14. Guinea-Bissau (1)
15. Indonesia (12)
16. Iran (16)
17. Ivory Coast (3)
18. Jordan (3)
19. Kazakhstan (8)
20. Kuwait (12)
21. Kyrgyzstan (9)
22. Lebanon (1)
23. Malaysia (12)
24. Maldives (11)
25. Mali (1)
26. Morocco (36)
27. Mozambique (3)
28. Niger (1)
29. Nigeria (6)
30. Oman (11)
31. Pakistan (7)
32. Palestine (4)
33. Qatar (16)
34. Saudi Arabia (16)
35. Senegal (8)
36. Sierra Leone (2)
37. Somalia (3)
38. Sudan (7)
39. Suriname (1)
40. Tajikistan (5)
41. Togo (5)
42. Turkey (41)
43. Turkmenistan (5)
44. Uganda (8)
45. Uzbekistan (26)
46. Yemen (2)

=== Para Athletics ===
21 athletes from 12 countries participated:

1. Algeria (2)
2. Azerbaijan (1)
3. Morocco (1)
4. Indonesia (2)
5. The Gambia (1)
6. Cameroon (3)
7. Uzbekistan (1)
8. Pakistan (1)
9. Senegal (1)
10. Togo (2)
11. Uganda (1)
12. Turkey (5)

== Gallery ==
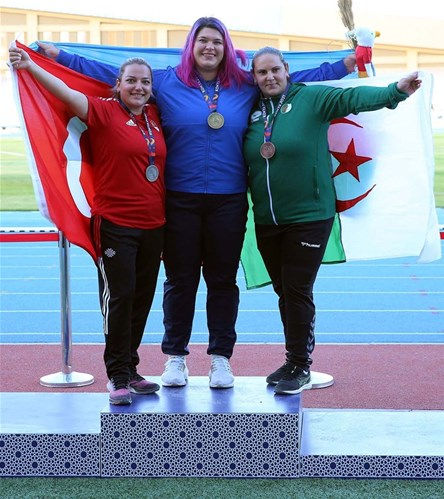
Women hammer throw medal ceremony

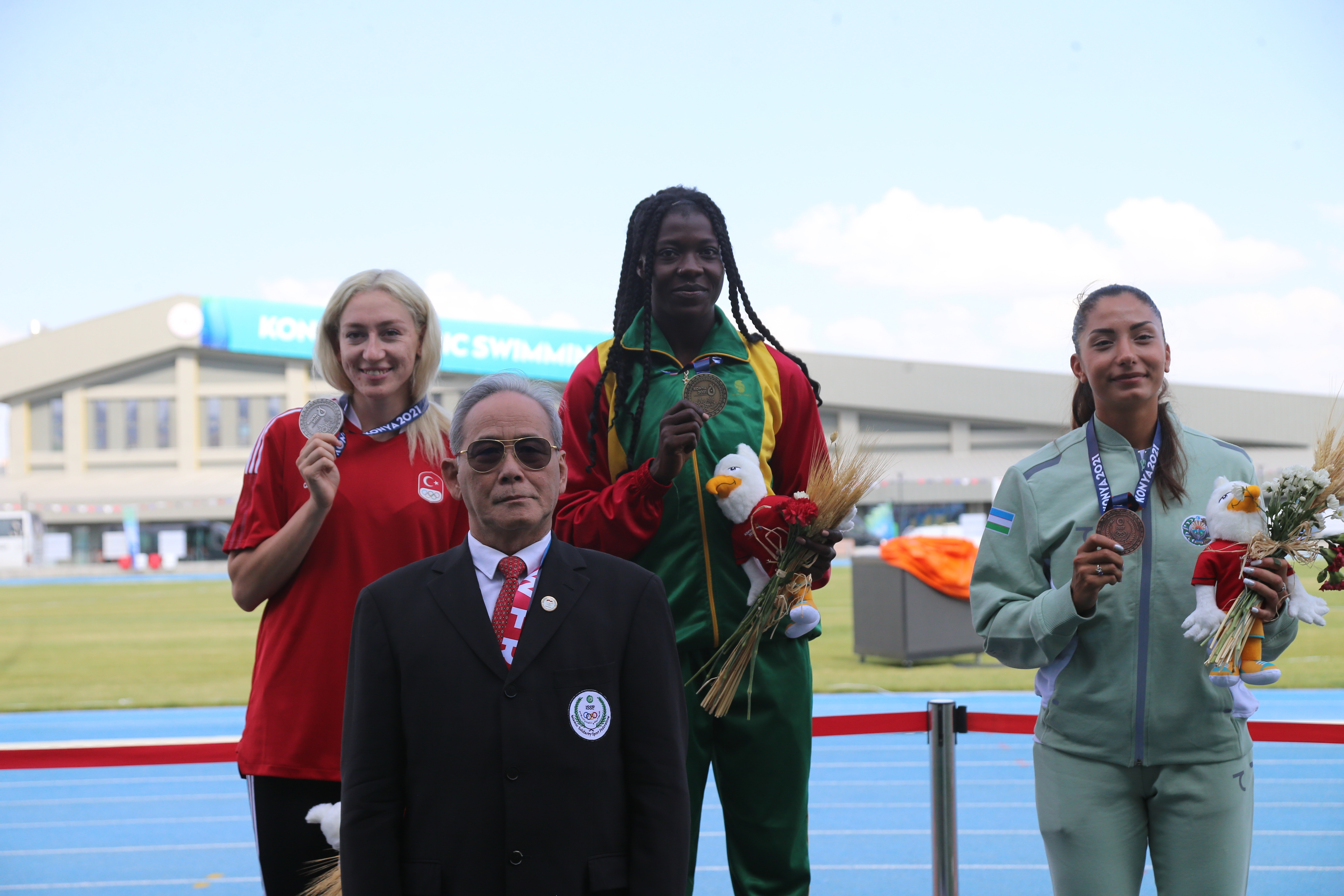
Women long jump medal ceremony

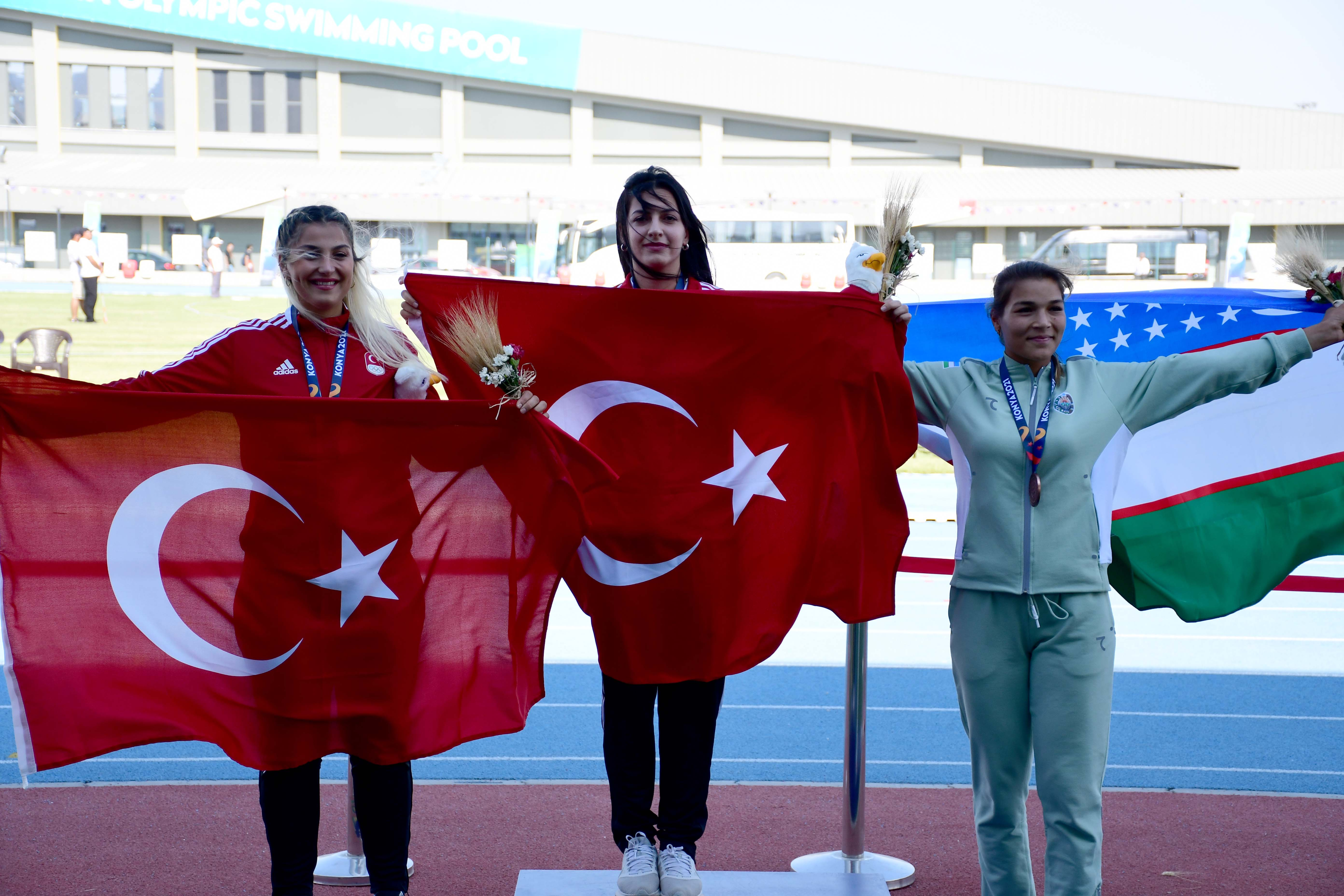
Women javelin throw medal ceremony

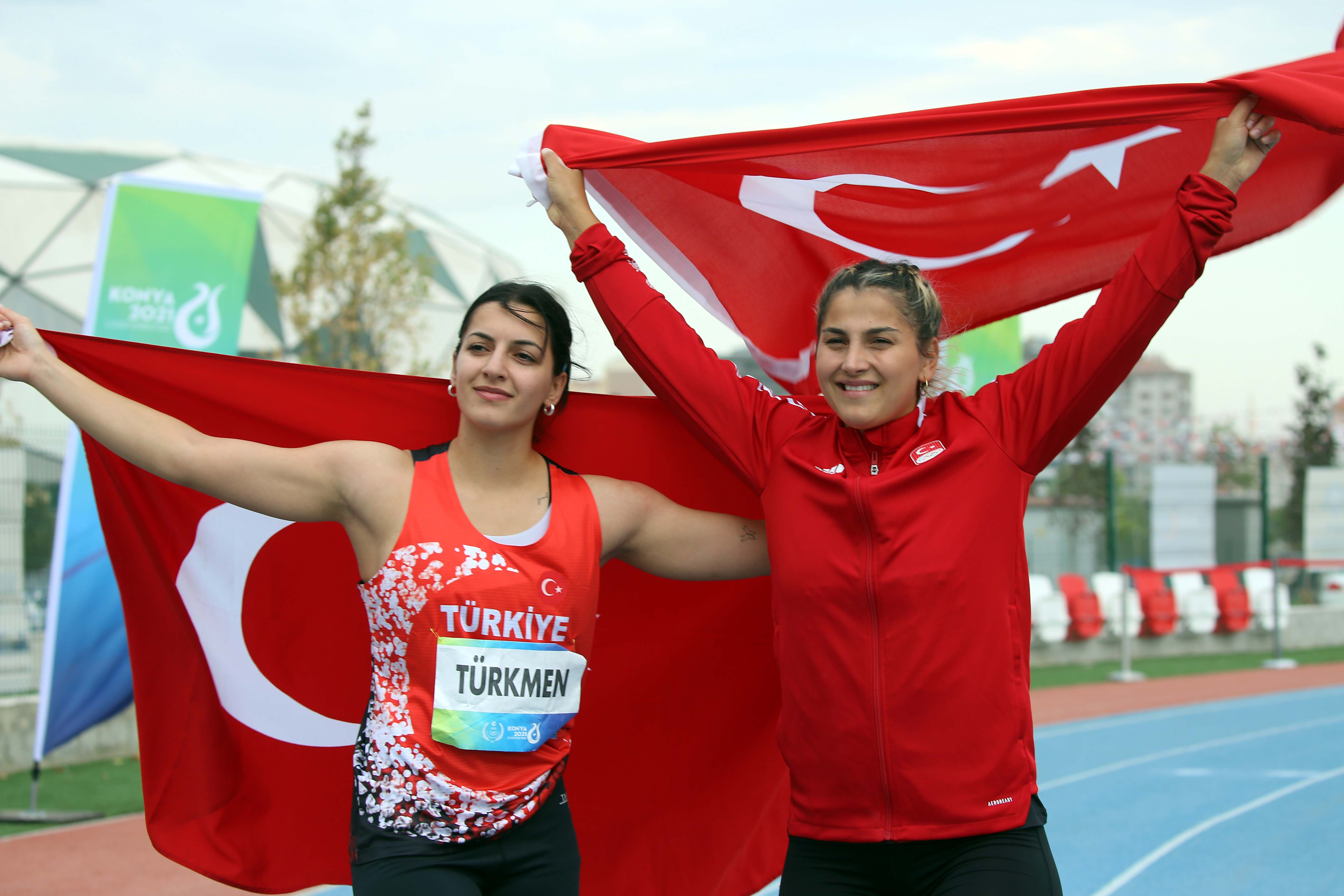
Women javelin throw Esra Türkmen and Eda Tuğsuz

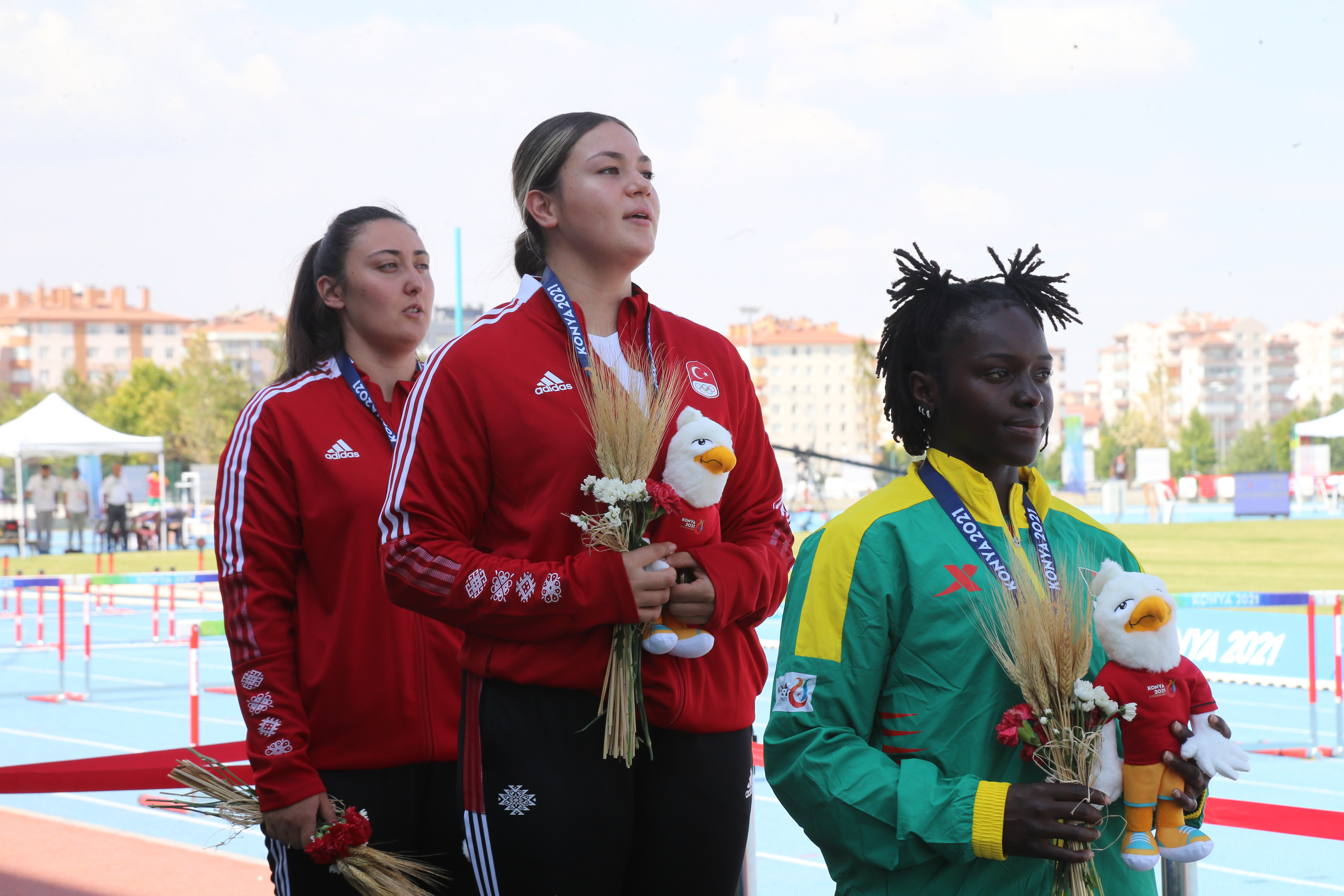
Women discus throw medal ceremony

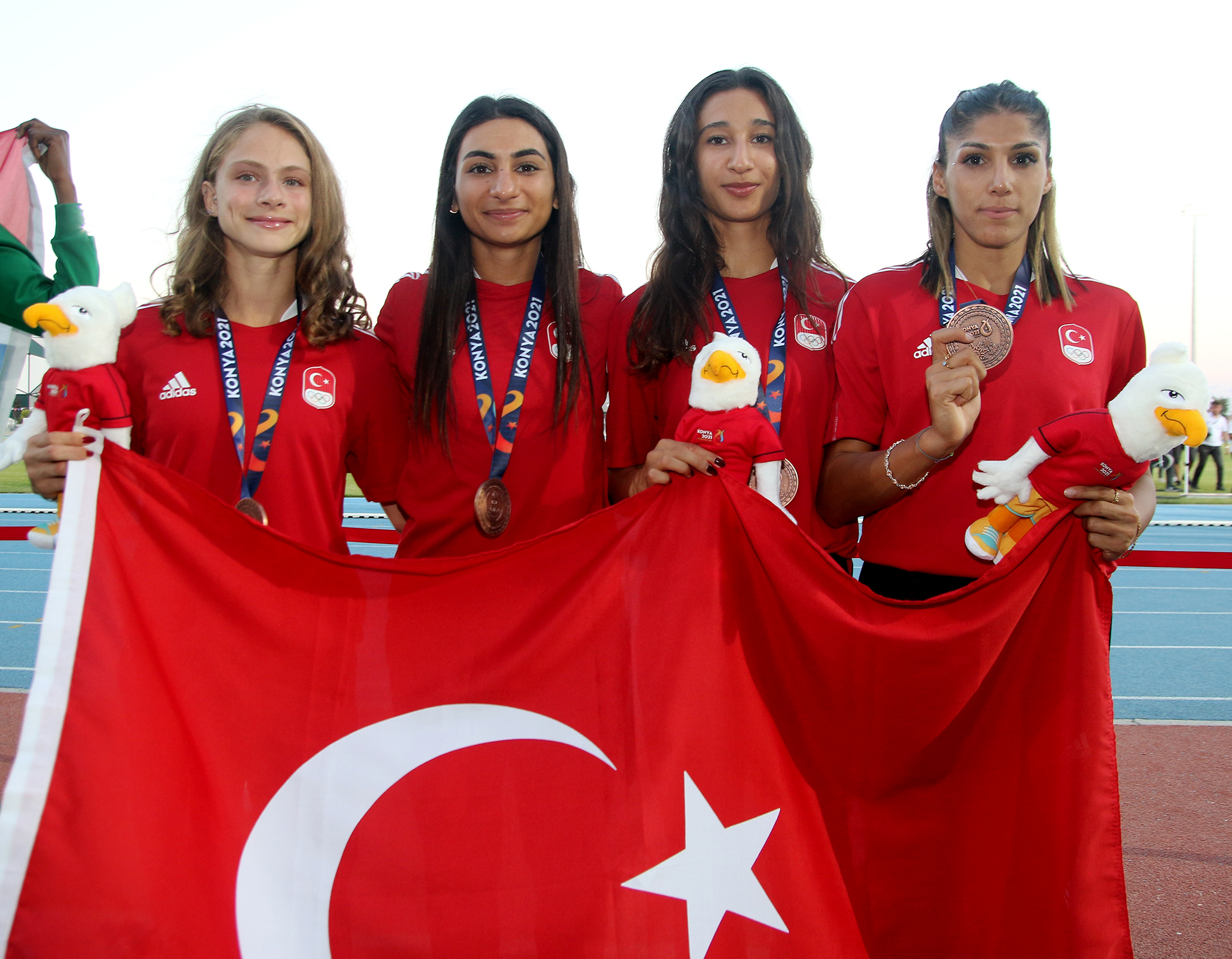
Women 4X100m Team Turkey

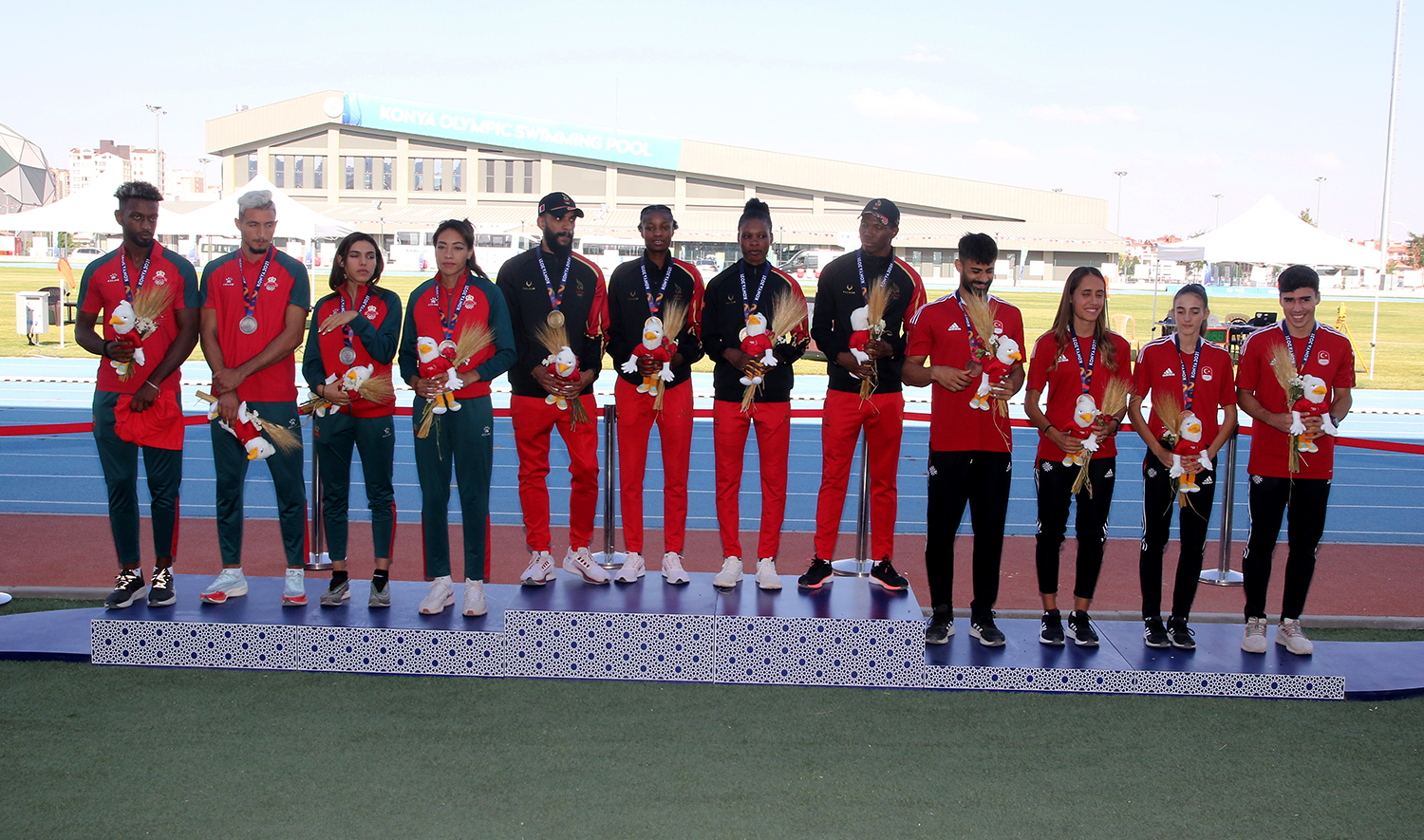
4 × 400 m Relay Medal ceremony

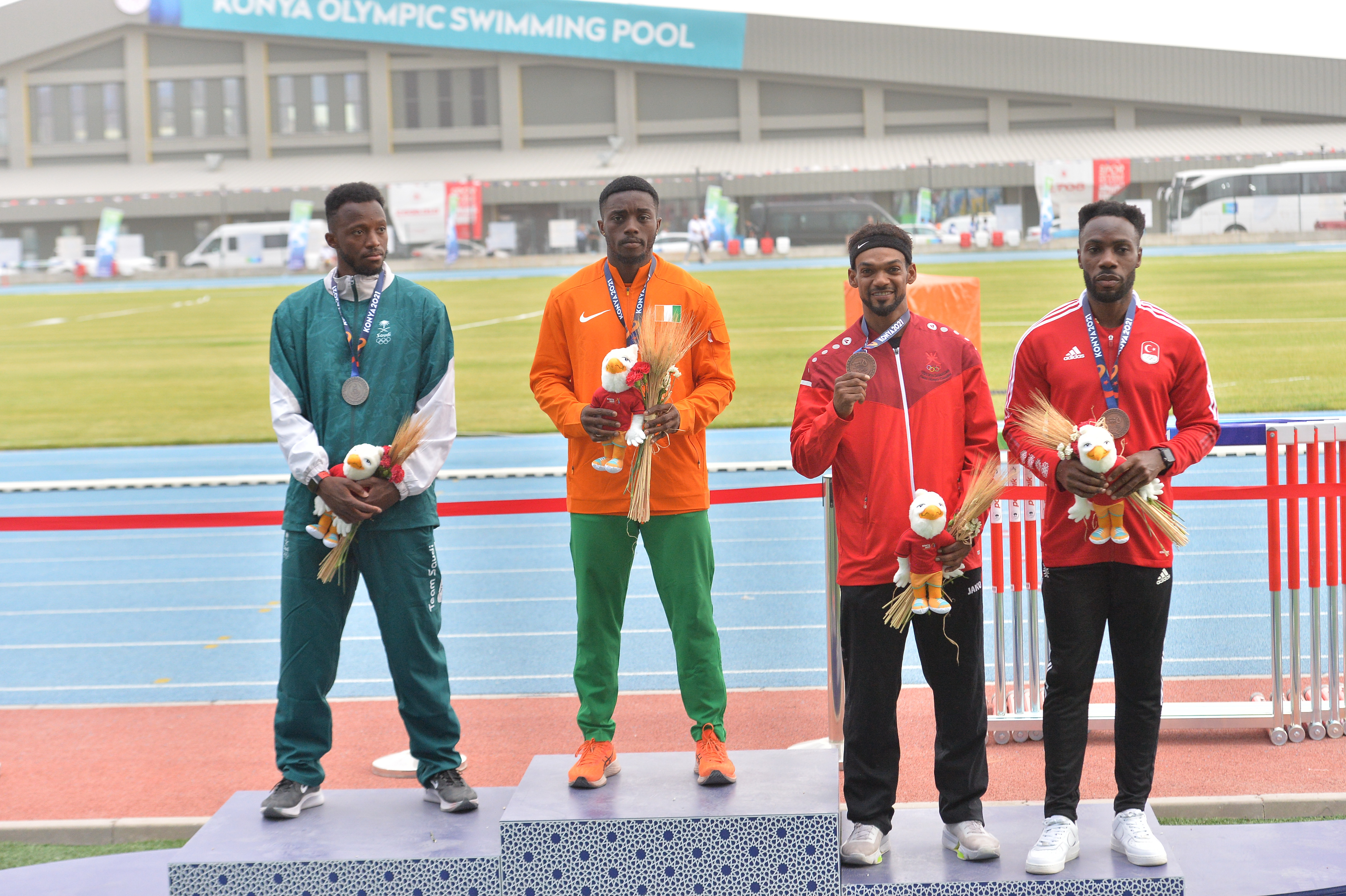
Men 100m Medal ceremony

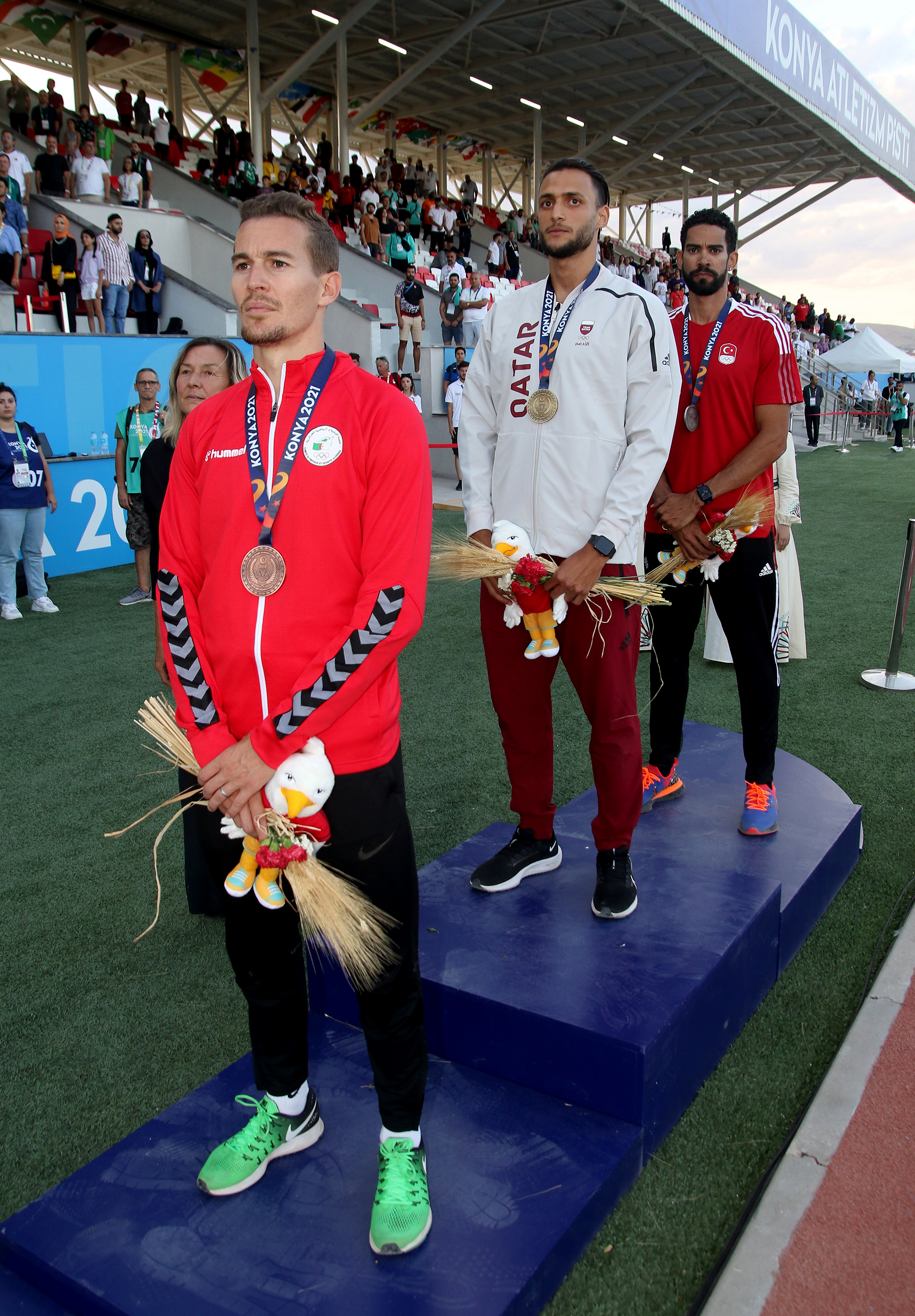
Men 400m hurdles Medal Ceremony

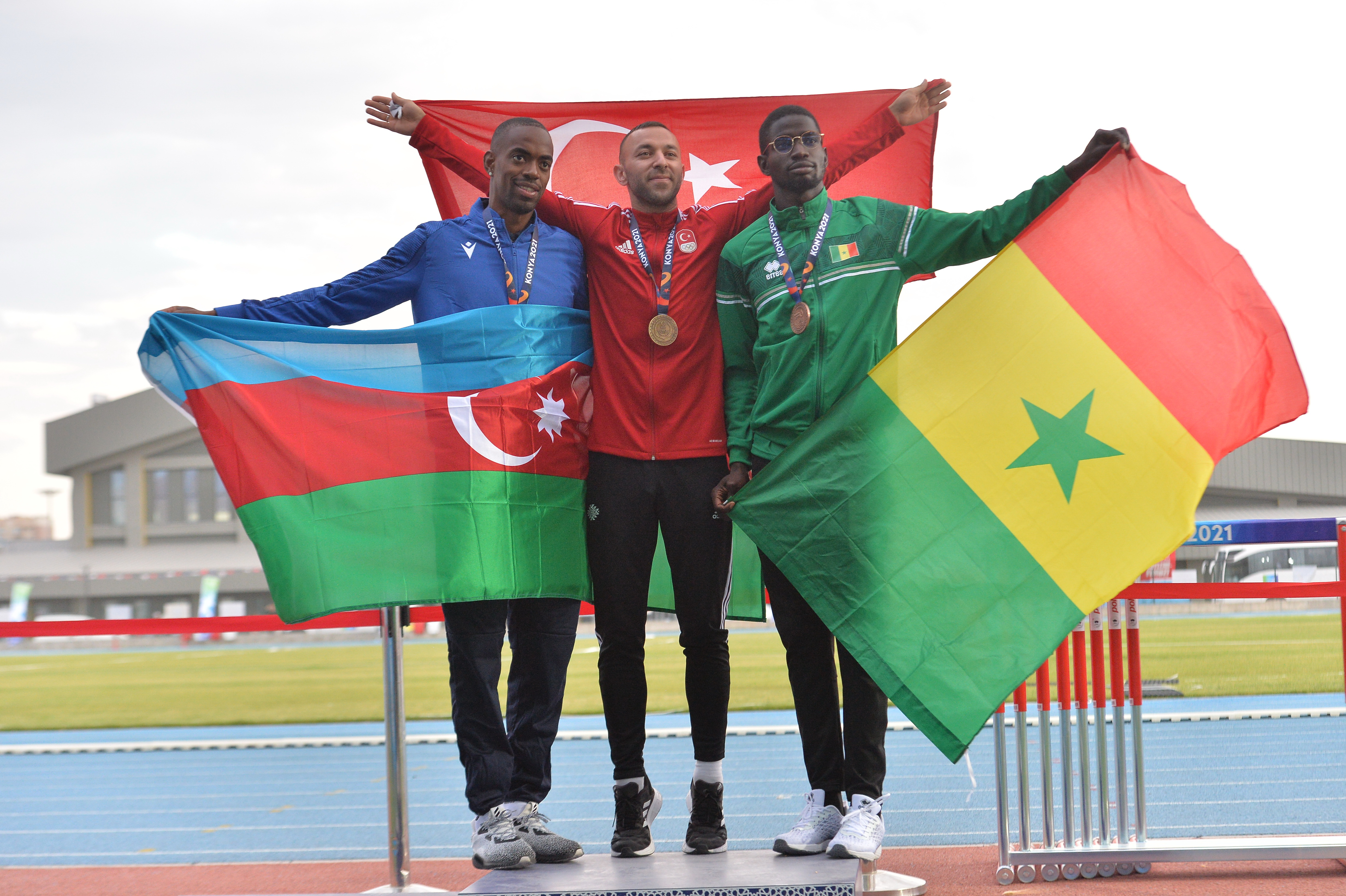
Men Triple jump Medal Ceremony
