= Taylon Bieldt =

South African athlete (born 1998)

Personal information
- Born: 4 November 1998 (age 27)

Sport
- Sport: Athletics
- Event: 400 m hurdles

Taylon Bieldt (born 4 November 1998) is a South African athlete specialising in the 100 metres hurdles and 400 metres hurdles. She has won several medals at continental level.

== International competitions ==
Year	Competition	Venue	Position	Event	Notes
Representing South Africa
2014	African Youth Games	Gaborone, Botswana	1st	100 m hurdles (76.2 cm)	13.58
2014	Youth Olympic Games	Nanjing, China	13th (h)	100 m hurdles (76.2 cm)	14.18
2015	African Youth Championships	Reduit, Mauritius	1st	100 m hurdles (76.2 cm)	13.30
2015	African Youth Championships	Reduit, Mauritius	1st	400 m hurdles	59.22
2015	African Youth Championships	Reduit, Mauritius	2nd	Medley relay	2:11.21
2015	World Youth Championships	Cali, Colombia	10th (sf)	100 m hurdles (76.2 cm)	13.57
2015	World Youth Championships	Cali, Colombia	2nd	Mixed 4 × 400 m relay	3:23.60
2015	Commonwealth Youth Games	Apia, Samoa	1st	100 m hurdles (76.2 cm)	13.18
2016	African Championships	Durban, South Africa	4th	100 m hurdles	13.47
2016	World U20 Championships	Bydgoszcz, Poland	7th	100 m hurdles	13.37
2016	World U20 Championships	Bydgoszcz, Poland	11th (h)	4 × 100 m relay	45.98
2017	African U20 Championships	Tlemcen, Algeria	1st	100 m hurdles	13.82
2019	Universiade	Naples, Italy	16th (sf)	200 m	23.83
2019	Universiade	Naples, Italy	11th (h)	4 × 100 m relay	46.05
2019	Universiade	Naples, Italy	7th	4 × 400 m relay	3:35.97
2019	African Games	Rabat, Morocco	3rd	100 m hurdles	13.40
2019	African Games	Rabat, Morocco	2nd	4 × 100 m relay	44.61
2019	African Games	Rabat, Morocco	5th	4 × 400 m relay	3:41.17
2022	African Championships	Port Louis, Mauritius	2nd	400 m hurdles	56.67
2022	African Championships	Port Louis, Mauritius	1st	4 × 400 m relay	3:29.34
2022	World Championships	Eugene, United States	27th (h)	400 m hurdles	56.67
2023	World Championships	Budapest, Hungary	30th (h)	100 m hurdles	13.05
2024	World Indoor Championships	Glasgow, United Kingdom	33rd (h)	60 m hurdles	8.25

== Personal bests ==
Outdoor

- 200 metres – 23.42 (-0.2 m/s, Sasolburg 2022)
- 400 metres – 52.81 (Pretoria 2020)
- 100 metres hurdles – 13.10 (-1.2 m/s, Madrid 2022)
- 400 metres hurdles – 55.80 (Potchefstroom 2022)

Indoor

- 60 metres hurdles – 8.25 (Glasgow 2024)
