= Rogail Joseph =

South African athlete (born 2000)

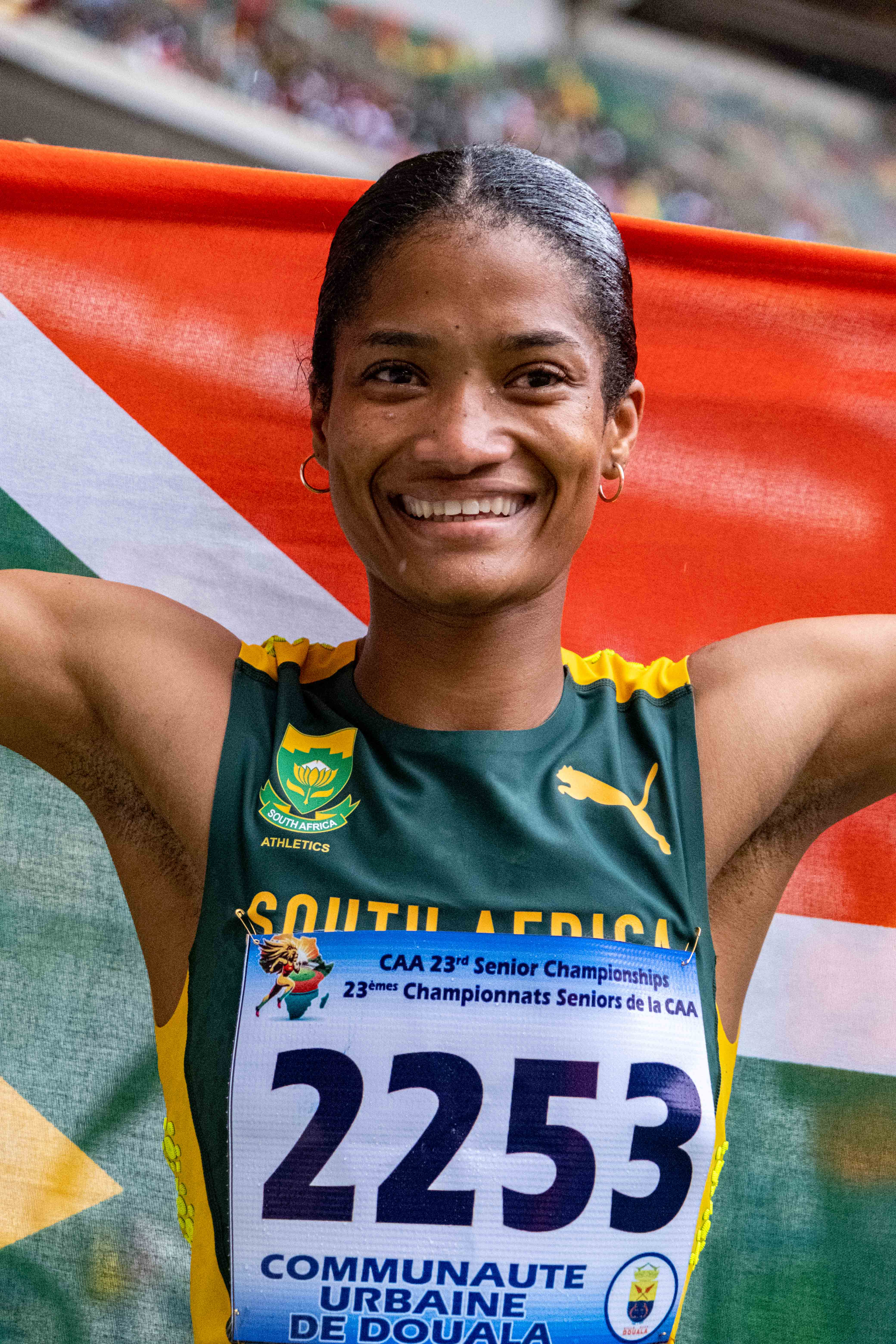
- Rogail Joseph 23rd African Athletics Senior Championships 2024

Personal information
- Nationality: South African
- Born: 22 April 2000 (age 26) Worcester, South Africa
- Height: 1.72/5 ft 8 in

Sport
- Sport: Athletics
- Event: Hurdler

Achievements and titles
- Personal best: 400m hurdles: 54.12 (2024 Summer Olympics)
Medal record
Women's athletics
Representing South Africa
African Championships
Gold medal – first place	2024 Douala	400 m hurdles
Gold medal – first place	2026 Accea	400 m hurdles
African Games
Gold medal – first place	2023 Accra	400 m hurdles
African U20 Championships
Gold medal – first place	2019 Abidjan	100 m hurdles
Gold medal – first place	2019 Abidjan	400 m hurdles

Rogail Joseph (born 22 April 2000) is a South African track and field athlete who competes over 400m hurdles. She won the gold medal at the 2023 African Games and the 2024 and 2026 African Championships.

== Early life ==
Joseph is from a suburb called Roodewal located in Worcester in the Western Cape, and attended Worcester Gymnasium as well as University of the Western Cape and North-West University.

== Career ==
She won the South African U20 400m Hurdles title at the SA Champs on 6 April 2019, in Stellenbosch. That month, she also won the 100m hurdles and 400m hurdles titles at the 2019 African U18 and U20 Championships in Athletics, as well as the South African University Championships 400m hurdles. She was nominated for Emerging Athlete of the Year at the 2019 G-Sport Awards.

In April 2023, she finished third over 400m hurdles at the South African National Championships. In August 2023, she competed at the World University Games, in Chengdu but was disqualified for an infringement.

She won a gold medal in the 400m hurdles race at the 2023 African Games in Accra in March 2024 in a personal best of 55.39. In April 2024, she finished runner-up at the South African National Championships 400m hurdles in Pietermaritzburg in a time of 54.84 seconds to secure the automatic qualifying time for the 2024 Summer Olympics. She subsequently competed in the 400 metres hurdles at the 2024 Summer Olympics in Paris in August 2024 where she ran a personal best time of 54.12 in the semi-final.

She competed in the 400 metres hurdles at the 2025 World Athletics Championships in Tokyo, Japan, running 56.20 seconds without qualifying for the semi-finals.

Joseph won the 400 m hurdles title at the 2026 South African Championships, running 55.94 seconds. In May, ran at the 2026 World Athletics Relays in the mixed 4 × 400 metres relay in Gaborone, Botswana. Later that month, Joseph retained her 400 m title at the 2026 African Championships in Athletics in Accra, Ghana with a season’s best of 54.73.

Joseph was selected as part of the South Africa team for the 2026 Commonwealth Games.

== Personal bests ==
Information from her World Athletics profile unless otherwise noted.

=== Individual events ===
Personal best times for individual events
Type	Event	Time	Venue	Date	Notes
Outdoor	200 metres	23.67	McArthur Stadium, Potchefstroom	25 May 2024	
Outdoor	300 metres	36.89	McArthur Stadium, Potchefstroom	6 February 2024	
Outdoor	400 metres	53.25	McArthur Stadium, Potchefstroom	10 April 2024	
Outdoor	100 metres hurdles	13.97	Abidjan	18 April 2019	
Outdoor	400 metres hurdles	54.12	Paris, France	6 August 2024	
