= Konya Athletic Field =

Sports venue in Konya, Turkey

Konya Athletic Field (Turkish: Konya Atletizm Pisti) is an outdoor sports venue for track and field athletics events located in Konya, Turkey.

The athletic field is located at SilleParsana neighborhood of Selçuklu district in Konya, Turkey. Built primarily to host the track and field athletics events at the 2021 Islamic Solidarity Games, it was opened ion 19 June 2022. It has a seating capacity of 1,500.
