= Athletics at the 2023 African Games – Women's 400 metres hurdles =

The women's 400 metres hurdles event at the 2023 African Games was held on 21 and 22 March 2024 in Accra, Ghana.

== Medalists ==
Gold	Silver	Bronze
Rogail Joseph; South Africa	Noura Ennadi; Morocco	Linda Angounou; Cameroon

== Results ==
=== Heats ===
Qualification: First 3 in each heat (Q) and the next 2 fastest (q) advanced to the final.

Rank	Heat	Name	Nationality	Time	Notes
1	2	Noura Ennadi	Morocco	56.88	Q
2	1	Linda Angounou	Cameroon	56.94	Q
3	1	Rogail Joseph	South Africa	58.12	Q
4	2	Vanice Nyagisera	Kenya	58.21	Q
5	1	Sita Sibiri	Burkina Faso	59.09	Q
6	1	Tigist Ayana	Ethiopia	59.66	q, NU20R
7	2	Ashley Miller	Zimbabwe	59.79	Q
8	2	Asana Hamidu	Ghana	59.98	q
9	1	Banchiayehu Tesema	Ethiopia	1:00.54	
10	2	Emebet Teketel	Ethiopia	1:00.92	
11	2	Fatoumata Koala	Burkina Faso	1:00.97	
12	1	Patrone Kouvoutoukila	Republic of the Congo	1:01.83	
13	2	Carolina Yomengue	Angola	1:08.71	

=== Final ===
Rank	Lane	Name	Nationality	Time	Notes
1st place, gold medalist(s)	4	Rogail Joseph	South Africa	55.39	
2nd place, silver medalist(s)	6	Noura Ennadi	Morocco	55.85	
3rd place, bronze medalist(s)	3	Linda Angounou	Cameroon	56.41	
4	7	Ashley Miller	Zimbabwe	58.26	
5	5	Vanice Nyagisera	Kenya	58.35	
6	8	Tigist Ayana	Ethiopia	59.89	
7	1	Asana Hamidu	Ghana	1:00.25	
	2	Sita Sibiri	Burkina Faso	DNS	
