= Amalie Iuel =

Danish-Norwegian hurdler (born 1994)

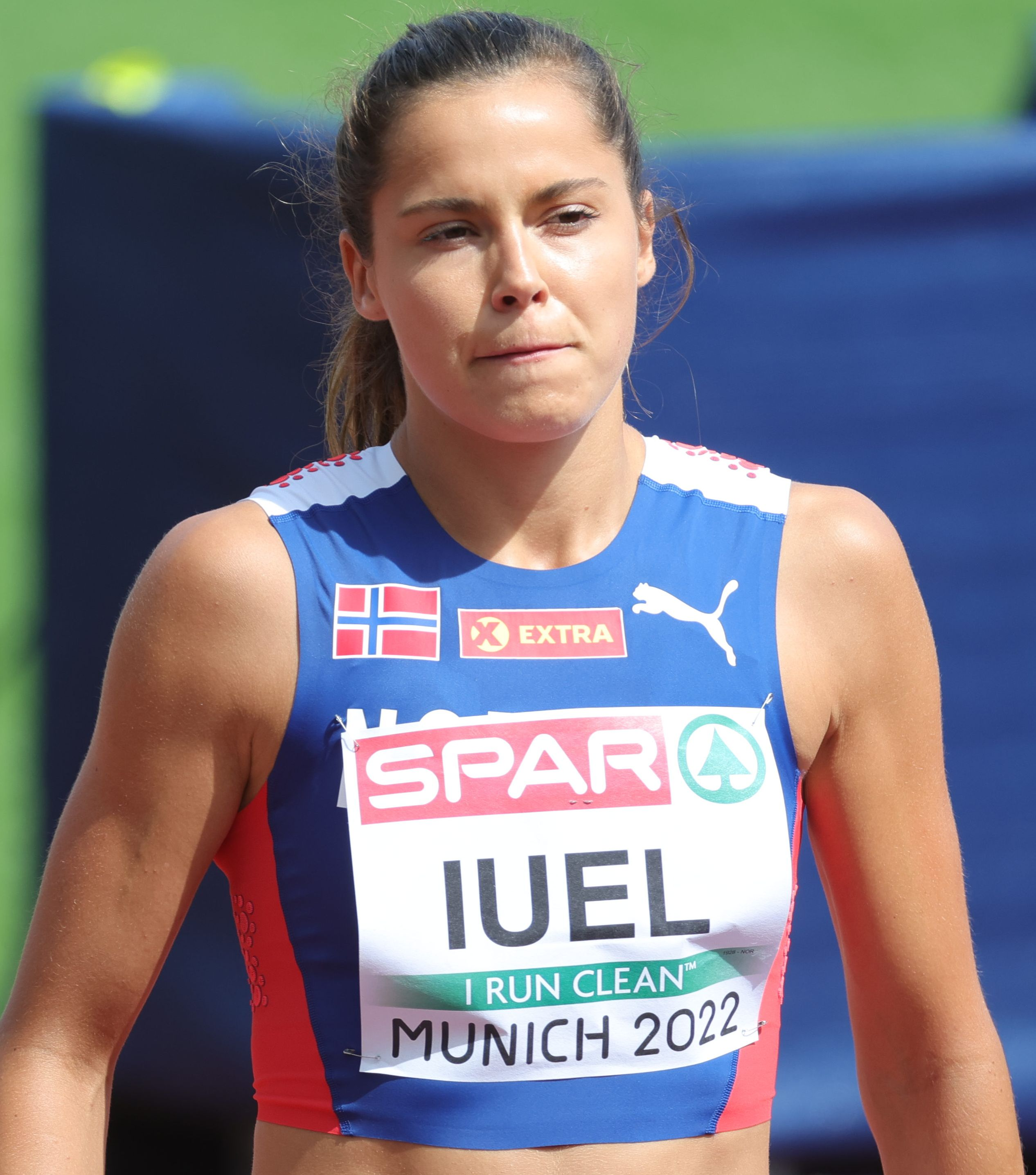
- Iuel in 2022

Personal information
- Full name: Amalie Hammild Iuel
- Nationality: Danish (until 2015); Norwegian (from 2015)
- Born: 17 April 1994 (age 32) Aalborg, Denmark
- Height: 1.78 m (5 ft 10 in)
- Weight: 61 kg (134 lb)

Sport
- Country: Norway
- Sport: Track and field
- Event: 400 metres hurdles
- University team: USC Trojans (IL Tyrving in Norway)

Achievements and titles
- Personal best: 54.28 (2025)
Medal record
Women's athletics
Representing Norway
World Relays
Gold medal – first place	2026 Gaborone	4 × 400 m relay
European Championships
Gold medal – first place	2026 Birmingham	4 × 400 m mixed

Amalie Hammild Iuel (born 17 April 1994) is a Danish-Norwegian hurdler. She represented Norway in the women's 400 metres hurdles at the 2015 World Championships in Athletics, but was eliminated in the heats.

== Biography ==
Amalie Iuel was born in Denmark to a Danish mother and a Danish-Norwegian father; the family moved to Norway when she was two years old, and she spent most of her childhood there. The Iuels left Norway when Amalie was twelve due to the demands of her father's job with Telenor; they first moved to Namibia, and later Pakistan, the United Arab Emirates and Thailand. Iuel took up track and field as a young girl in Norway, but did not pursue it seriously before her time in Thailand at the International School Bangkok (ISB); her coach there, Ugo Costessi, introduced her to the 400 metres hurdles. After high school, she moved to the United States and became a student athlete at the University of Southern California (USC).

== Personal life ==
Amalie Iuel, who belongs to the Danish nobility, has been in a relationship with former alpine skier Aksel Lund Svindal since 2020. The couple had a son, in September 2023. A month later, they announced their engagement.

== NCAA ==
During the 2015 season (her sophomore year at USC) Iuel set both Danish and Norwegian under-23 records in the women's 400 metres hurdles, running 55.92 as a Dane and 56.36 as a Norwegian. She placed seventh at the 2015 NCAA championships with 56.99.

Year	Competition	Position	Event	Time
Representing University of Southern California
2017	NCAA Division I Outdoor Track & Field Championships	3rd	400 m hurdles	55.82
2017	NCAA Division I Outdoor Track & Field Championships	2nd	4 × 400 m	3:23.35
2017	NCAA Division I Indoor Track and Field Championships	1st	4 × 400 m relay	3:27.03
2016	NCAA Division I Outdoor Track & Field Championships	10th	400 m hurdles	56.88
2016	NCAA Division I Outdoor Track & Field Championships	8th	4 × 400 m	3:40.61
2016	NCAA Division I Indoor Track and Field Championships	4th	4 × 400 m relay	3:29.98
2016	NCAA Division I Indoor Track and Field Championships	3rd	pentathlon	4425 points
2015	NCAA Division I Outdoor Track & Field Championships	7th	400 m hurdles	56.99
2015	NCAA Division I Outdoor Track & Field Championships	2nd	4 × 400 m	3:29.97
2015	NCAA Division I Indoor Track and Field Championships	3rd	4 × 400 m relay	3:29.63
2014	NCAA Division I Outdoor Track & Field Championships	18th	400 m hurdles	59.74

== Professional ==
She received Norwegian citizenship and switched her athletic allegiance from Denmark to Norway in June 2015, shortly before the 2015 European U23 Championships where she placed fifth as a Norwegian in her first international championship meet. She represented Norway in the 400 metres hurdles at the 2015 World Championships in Athletics in Beijing, China, but was eliminated in the first round.

In 2019, she represented Norway at the 2019 Summer Universiade in Naples, Italy and she won the bronze medal in the women's 400 metres hurdles event.

Iuel was a member of the Norwegian team which won the gold medal in the mixed 4 × 400 m relay at the 2026 European Championships alongside Karsten Warholm, Henriette Jæger and Andreas Ofstad Kulseng, with the quartet setting a new championship record time of 3:09.62.

Year	Competition	Venue	Position	Event	Notes
Representing Norway
2026	European Championships	Birmingham, United Kingdom	1st	Mixed 4 × 400 m relay	3:09.62
2026	World Relaya	Gaborone, Botswana	1st	4 × 400 m relay	3:20.96
2025	World Relays	Guangzhou, China	4th	4 × 400 m relay	3:25.35
2022	European Athletics Championships	Munich, Germany	5th	400 m hurdles	55.32
2022	World Athletics Championships	Eugene, United States	15th	400 m hurdles	54.81
2021	Summer Olympics	Tokyo, Japan	21st	400 m hurdles	57.61
2019	2019 World Championships in Athletics	Doha, Qatar	10th	400 m hurdles	55.03
2019	European Athletics Team Championships	Sandnes, Norway	1st	400 m hurdles	55.80
2019	European Athletics Team Championships	Sandnes, Norway	1st	4 × 400 m	3:33.69
2019	2019 Summer Universiade	Naples, Italy	3rd	400 m hurdles	56.13
2018	2018 European Athletics Championships	Berlin, Germany	11th	400 m hurdles	55.81
2017	2017 World Championships in Athletics	London, England	25th	400 m hurdles	56.42
2017	European Athletics Team Championships	Vaasa, Finland	2nd	400 m hurdles	55.68
2017	European Athletics Team Championships	Vaasa, Finland	DQ	4 × 400 m	DQ
2016	2016 Summer Olympics	Rio de Janeiro, Brazil	29th	400 m hurdles	56.75
2016	2016 European Championships in Athletics	Amsterdam, Netherlands	6th	400 m hurdles	56.24
2015	2015 World Championships in Athletics	Beijing, China	26th	400 m hurdles	56.59
2015	2015 European Athletics U23 Championships	Tallinn, Estonia	5th	400 m hurdles	56.36

=== Domestic Championships ===
Year	Competition	Location	Position	Event	Time Height
2011	Norwegian Athletics Association; U20 Outdoor Track and Field Championships	Kristiansand, Norway	4th	High Jump	1.55 m (5 ft 1 in)
2012	Norwegian Athletics Association; Senior Outdoor Track and Field Championships	Kristiansand, Norway	10th	100 m hurdles	15.40
2012	Norwegian Athletics Association; Senior Outdoor Track and Field Championships	Kristiansand, Norway	2nd	400 m hurdles	1:02.52
2012	Norwegian Athletics Association; Senior Outdoor Track and Field Championships	Kristiansand, Norway	4th	High Jump	1.65 m (5 ft 5 in)
2012	Norwegian Athletics Association; U20 Outdoor Track and Field Championships	Askøy, Norway	6th	100 m hurdles	14.77
2012	Norwegian Athletics Association; U20 Outdoor Track and Field Championships	Askøy, Norway	1st	400 m hurdles	1:01.47
2012	Norwegian Athletics Association; U20 Outdoor Track and Field Championships	Askøy, Norway	2nd	High Jump	1.68 m (5 ft 6 in)
2012	Athletics Association of Thailand; U20 Outdoor Track and Field Championships	Bangkok, Thailand	2nd	100 m hurdles	14.69
2012	Athletics Association of Thailand; U20 Outdoor Track and Field Championships	Bangkok, Thailand	1st	400 m	56.80
2012	Athletics Association of Thailand; U20 Outdoor Track and Field Championships	Bangkok, Thailand	1st	400 m hurdles	1:01.63
2012	Athletics Association of Thailand; U20 Outdoor Track and Field Championships	Bangkok, Thailand	3rd	High Jump	1.65 m (5 ft 5 in)
2013	Norwegian Athletics Association; U20 Outdoor Track and Field Championships	Overhalla, Norway	1st	400 m hurdles	1:02.96
2013	Norwegian Athletics Association; U20 Outdoor Track and Field Championships	Overhalla, Norway	5th	High Jump	1.60 m (5 ft 3 in)
2017	Norwegian Athletics Association; Senior Outdoor Track and Field Championships	Sandnes, Norway	1st	400 m hurdles	56.55
2017	Norwegian Athletics Association; Senior Outdoor Track and Field Championships	Sandnes, Norway	1st	400 m	53.27
2018	Norwegian Athletics Association; Senior Outdoor Track and Field Championships	Byrkjelo, Norway	1st	400 m	54.68
2019	Norwegian Athletics Association; Senior Outdoor Track and Field Championships	Hamar, Norway	1st	400 m	52.43
2019	Norwegian Athletics Association; Senior Outdoor Track and Field Championships	Hamar, Norway	1st	400 m hurdles	56.08
2020	Norwegian Athletics Association; Senior Indoor Track and Field Championships	Bærum, Norway	1st	400 m	52.25
2020	Norwegian Athletics Association; Senior Indoor Track and Field Championships	Bærum, Norway	1st	4 × 200 m	1:39.09
2020	Norwegian Athletics Association; Senior Outdoor Track and Field Championships	Bergen, Norway	1st	400 m hurdles	55.63
2021	Norwegian Athletics Association; Senior Outdoor Track and Field Championships	Kristiansand, Norway	1st	400 m	52.67
2022	Norwegian Athletics Association; Senior Outdoor Track and Field Championships	Stjørdal, Norway	1st	400 m hurdles	56.08
