= Precious Molepo =

South African sprinter (born 2005)

Personal information
- Born: 15 February 2005 (age 21)

Sport
- Sport: Athletics
- Event: Sprint

Achievements and titles
- Personal best: 400 m: 52.32 (2025)
Medal record
Women's athletics
Representing South Africa
African Championships
Gold medal – first place	2022 Saint Pierre	4×400 m relay
World Relays
Bronze medal – third place	2025 Guangzhou	4×400 m relay
World University Games
Silver medal – second place	2025 Bochum	4×400 m relay mixed

Precious Molepo (born 15 February 2005) is a South African sprinter.

== Biography ==
In April 2022, Molepo won the South African Athletics Championships over 400 metres in Cape Town. She was a gold medalist in the 4 × 400 m relay at the 2022 African Athletics Championships in Saint Pierre, Mauritius. She previously also finished in seventh place in the individual 400 metres. She was named in the South African team for the 2022 World Athletics Championships, as well as the World Athletics U20 Championships in Cali, Colombia.

She won the U19 400 metres race at the ASA Youth and Junior Championships in Pietermaritzburg on 24 March 2023. At the 2023 African Junior Athletics Championships in Ndola, she won the gold medal in the pole vault, and alongside Wiaan Martin, Jessica van Heerden, and Rorisang Rammupudu in the U20 mixed 4 × 400 m relay final. She also won silver medals in both the 400 metres and the women's 4 × 400 metres relay.

She was part of the South African women's 4 x 400 metres relay team which ran a 3:24.84 national record to place third at the 2025 World Athletics Relays in China. She was part of the South African mixed 4x400m relay team which won a silver medal at the 2025 Summer World University Games.

In May 2026, she ran at the 2026 World Athletics Relays in the women's 4 × 400 metres relay in Gaborone, Botswana.

== Personal life ==
She attended the University of Johannesburg.
