= Iran at the 2025 Islamic Solidarity Games =

- IOC code: IRI
- NOC: National Olympic Committee of the Islamic Republic of Iran

in Riyadh
- Competitors: 189 in 19 sports
- Flag bearers: Alireza Moeini; Maryam Barbat
- Medals Ranked 3rd: Gold 29 Silver 19 Bronze 33 Total 81

Islamic Solidarity Games appearances (overview)
- 2005; 2013; 2017; 2021; 2025

Iran participated at the 2025 Islamic Solidarity Games, which were held from 7 to 21 November 2025 in Riyadh, Saudi Arabia.

== Competitors ==
Sport	Men	Women	Total
3x3 basketball	4	4	8
Athletics	2	5	7
Boxing	3	2	5
Duathlon	3	3	6
Fencing	8	1	9
Futsal	14		14
Handball	16	16	32
Judo	3	2	5
Ju-jitsu	3	2	5
Karate	3	3	6
Muaythai	3	4	7
Para athletics	1	3	4
Para powerlifting	1	1	2
Swimming	9		9
Table tennis	3	3	6
Taekwondo	6	6	12
Volleyball	12	12	24
Weightlifting	5	5	10
Wrestling	12		12
Wushu	3	3	6
Total	114	75	189

== Medal summary ==
=== Medals by sport ===
Sport	Gold	Silver	Bronze	Total
3x3 basketball		1		1
Athletics	2	1	1	4
Boxing			1	1
Fencing			2	2
Futsal	1			1
Handball			1	1
Judo			1	1
Ju-jitsu			3	3
Karate	3	2		5
Muaythai		4		4
Para athletics	2	1	1	4
Para powerlifting	1			1
Swimming	1	1	3	5
Table tennis	2	1	2	5
Taekwondo	2	2	4	8
Volleyball	1		1	2
Weightlifting	2	4	9	15
Wrestling	8	1	3	12
Wushu	4	1	1	6
Total	29	19	33	81

=== Medalists ===
Medal	Name	Sport	Event
Gold	Ali Amirian	Athletics	Men's 800 m
Gold	Fatemeh Mohitizadeh	Athletics	Women's heptathlon
Gold	Bagher Mohammadi; Behzad Rasouli; Amir Hossein Gholami; Hossein Sabzi; Mohammad Hossein Derakhshani; Mohammad Hossein Bazyar; Mehdi Karimi; Moslem Oladghobad; Saeid Ahmadabbasi; Hossein Tayyebi; Ali Khalilvand; Salar Aghapour; Masoud Yousef; Behrouz Azimi	Futsal	Men
Gold	Fatemeh Sadeghi	Karate	Women's individual kata
Gold	Sara Bahmanyar	Karate	Women's kumite 50 kg
Gold	Atousa Golshadnejad	Karate	Women's kumite 61 kg
Gold	Yasin Khosravi	Para athletics	Men's shot put F57
Gold	Hashemieh Motaghian	Para athletics	Women's javelin throw F55/56
Gold	Rouhollah Rostami	Para powerlifting	Men's heavyweight
Gold	Samyar Abdoli	Swimming	Men's 50 m freestyle
Gold	Neda Shahsavari	Table tennis	Women's singles
Gold	Shima Safaei; Neda Shahsavari	Table tennis	Women's doubles
Gold	Ali Asghar Alimoradian	Taekwondo	Men's 60 kg
Gold	Sayna Karimi	Taekwondo	Women's 46 kg
Gold	Amir Reza Aftab Azari; Amir Hossein Sadati; Alireza Moslehabadi; Ehsan Daneshdoust; Mohammad Reza Hazratpour; Yousef Kazemi; Pouya Ariakhah; Alireza Abdolhamidi; Ali Ramezani; Arshia Behnejad; Ali Hajipour; Eisa Nasseri	Volleyball	Men
Gold	Ilia Salehipour	Weightlifting	Men's 88 kg snatch
Gold	Mahsa Beheshti	Weightlifting	Women's 86 kg clean & jerk
Gold	Rahman Amouzad	Wrestling	Men's freestyle 65 kg
Gold	Younes Emami	Wrestling	Men's freestyle 74 kg
Gold	Amir Ali Azarpira	Wrestling	Men's freestyle 97 kg
Gold	Amir Hossein Zare	Wrestling	Men's freestyle 125 kg
Gold	Saeid Esmaeili	Wrestling	Men's Greco-Roman 67 kg
Gold	Gholamreza Farrokhi	Wrestling	Men's Greco-Roman 87 kg
Gold	Mohammad Hadi Saravi	Wrestling	Men's Greco-Roman 97 kg
Gold	Fardin Hedayati	Wrestling	Men's Greco-Roman 130 kg
Gold	Amir Hossein Hemmati	Wushu	Men's sanda 60 kg
Gold	Erfan Moharrami	Wushu	Men's sanda 70 kg
Gold	Sara Shafiei	Wushu	Women's sanda 56 kg
Gold	Soheila Mansourian	Wushu	Women's sanda 60 kg
Silver	Peter Grigorian; Alireza Sharifi; Majid Rahimian; Amir Hossein Yazarloo	3x3 basketball	Men
Silver	Mohammad Reza Tayyebi	Athletics	Men's shot put
Silver	Morteza Nemati	Karate	Men's kumite 75 kg
Silver	Saleh Abazari	Karate	Men's kumite +84 kg
Silver	Majid Hashembeigi	Muaythai	Men's 80 kg
Silver	Fereshteh Hassanzadeh	Muaythai	Women's 50 kg
Silver	Zahra Akbari	Muaythai	Women's 60 kg
Silver	Fatemeh Hosseini	Muaythai	Women's 65 kg
Silver	Zeinab Moradi	Para athletics	Women's javelin throw F55/56
Silver	Homer Abbasi	Swimming	Men's 50 m backstroke
Silver	Benyamin Faraji; Amir Hossein Hodaei; Mohammad Mousavi Taher	Table tennis	Men’s team
Silver	Amir Reza Sadeghian	Taekwondo	Men's 82 kg
Silver	Yalda Valinejad	Taekwondo	Women's 70 kg
Silver	Ilia Salehipour	Weightlifting	Men's 88 kg
Silver	Alireza Moeini	Weightlifting	Men's 94 kg
Silver	Alireza Moeini	Weightlifting	Men's 94 kg snatch
Silver	Alireza Nassiri	Weightlifting	Men's 110 kg clean & jerk
Silver	Amir Abdi	Wrestling	Men's Greco-Roman 77 kg
Silver	Farbod Taleshi	Wushu	Men's sanda 85 kg
Bronze	Mahsa Mirzatabibi	Athletics	Women's pole vault
Bronze	Danial Shahbakhsh	Boxing	Men's 60 kg
Bronze	Behnam Beik; Mohammad Esmaeili; Mohammad Ali Khakzar; Amir Hossein Movashahi	Fencing	Men's team épée
Bronze	Mohammad Fotouhi; Taha Kargarpour; Ali Pakdaman; Nima Zahedi	Fencing	Men's team sabre
Bronze	Fatemeh Merikh; Hanieh Karimi; Setareh Rahmanian; Atieh Shahsavari; Fatemeh Khalili; Mina Vatanparast; Hadiseh Norouzi; Bahar Izadgashb; Aseman Badvi; Leila Hosseini; Hedieh Hafez; Arezoo Kianiara; Arezoo Mohammadi; Negar Zendehboudi; Nastaran Farahani; Sanaz Rajabi	Handball	Women
Bronze	Maryam Barbat	Judo	Women's 70 kg
Bronze	Ali Akbarpour	Ju-jitsu	Men's jiu-jitsu 85 kg
Bronze	Yasamin Nazari	Ju-jitsu	Women's jiu-jitsu 52 kg
Bronze	Hasti Hamoudi	Ju-jitsu	Women's jiu-jitsu 70 kg
Bronze	Parastoo Habibi	Para athletics	Women's club throw F32
Bronze	Mohammad Ghasemi	Swimming	Men's 200 m freestyle
Bronze	Mohammad Mehdi Gholami	Swimming	Men's 200 m butterfly
Bronze	Mohammad Ghasemi; Mohammad Mehdi Gholami; Ali Rashidpour; Matin Sohran	Swimming	Men's 4 × 200 m freestyle relay
Bronze	Benyamin Faraji; Amir Hossein Hodaei	Table tennis	Men's doubles
Bronze	Setayesh Iloukhani; Shima Safaei; Neda Shahsavari	Table tennis	Women’s team
Bronze	Ali Khoshravesh	Taekwondo	Men's 74 kg
Bronze	Rojan Goudarzi	Taekwondo	Women's 51 kg
Bronze	Hasti Mohammadi	Taekwondo	Women's 57 kg
Bronze	Melika Mirhosseini	Taekwondo	Women's +70 kg
Bronze	Aytak Salamat; Zahra Salehi; Shaghayegh Hassankhani; Reihaneh Karimi; Zahra Karimi; Fatemeh Khalili; Zahra Moghani; Elaheh Poursaleh; Sepinoud Dastbarjan; Masoumeh Ghadami; Kimia Kiani; Ghazaleh Boustan	Volleyball	Women
Bronze	Ilia Salehipour	Weightlifting	Men's 88 kg clean & jerk
Bronze	Alireza Moeini	Weightlifting	Men's 94 kg clean & jerk
Bronze	Reza Hassanpour	Weightlifting	Men's +110 kg
Bronze	Reza Hassanpour	Weightlifting	Men's +110 kg clean & jerk
Bronze	Reihaneh Karimi	Weightlifting	Women's 69 kg
Bronze	Reihaneh Karimi	Weightlifting	Women's 69 kg clean & jerk
Bronze	Zahra Hosseini	Weightlifting	Women's 77 kg snatch
Bronze	Mahsa Beheshti	Weightlifting	Women's 86 kg
Bronze	Mahsa Beheshti	Weightlifting	Women's 86 kg snatch
Bronze	Ali Momeni	Wrestling	Men's freestyle 57 kg
Bronze	Kamran Ghasempour	Wrestling	Men's freestyle 86 kg
Bronze	Ali Ahmadi Vafa	Wrestling	Men's Greco-Roman 60 kg
Bronze	Shahrbanoo Mansourian	Wushu	Women's sanda 60 kg

== Results by event ==
=== 3x3 basketball ===
Athlete	Event	Preliminary round				Semifinal	Final	Rank
Athlete	Event	Round 1	Round 2	Round 3	Rank	Semifinal	Final	Rank
Peter Grigorian; Alireza Sharifi; Majid Rahimian; Amir Hossein Yazarloo	Men	Turkey; W 21–14	Ivory Coast; L 12–16	Qatar; W 16–15	2 Q	Bahrain; W 21–18	Egypt; L 14–21	2nd place, silver medalist(s)
Mahla Abedi; Negin Rasoulipour; Kimia Yazdian; Shamim Nouri	Women	Egypt; W 21–14	Qatar; W 21–7	Algeria; W 19–9	1 Q	Turkey; L 11–14	3rd place match Egypt; L 16–21	4

=== Athletics ===
==== Athletics ====
Track & Field

Athlete	Event	Round 1		Final	Rank
Athlete	Event	Time	Rank	Time / Result	Rank
Ali Amirian	Men's 800 m	1:50.17	3 Q	1:46.18	1st place, gold medalist(s)
Ali Amirian	Men's 1500 m	DNF	—	Did not advance	—
Mohammad Reza Tayyebi	Men's shot put	—N/a		19.35 m	2nd place, silver medalist(s)
Mahsa Mirzatabibi	Women's pole vault	—N/a		3.86 m	3rd place, bronze medalist(s)
Mahla Mahroughi	Women's discus throw	—N/a		49.59 m	6
Zahra Najafi	Women's javelin throw	—N/a		51.30 m	4

Combined

Athlete	Event	100mH	HJ	SP	200m	LJ	JT	800m	Total	Rank
Saba Khorasani	Women's heptathlon	14.30; 936	1.65 m 795	11.12 m 603	25.47; 844	5.57 m 720	32.62 m 526	2:23.19; 781	5205	4
Fatemeh Mohitizadeh	Women's heptathlon	13.95; 985	1.68 m 830	11.93 m 656	25.40; 850	6.12 m 887	34.28 m 558	2:22.02; 796	5562	1st place, gold medalist(s)

==== Para athletics ====
Athlete	Event	Distance	Points	Rank
Yasin Khosravi	Men's shot put F57	15.65	—N/a	1st place, gold medalist(s)
Zeinab Moradi	Women's javelin throw F55/56	21.98	924	2nd place, silver medalist(s)
Hashemieh Motaghian	Women's javelin throw F55/56	22.45	944	1st place, gold medalist(s)
Parastoo Habibi	Women's club throw F32	22.89	—N/a	3rd place, bronze medalist(s)

=== Boxing ===
Athlete	Event	Round of 16	Quarterfinal	Semifinal	Final	Rank
Danial Shahbakhsh	Men's 60 kg	—N/a	Bektenov (KGZ); W 5–0	Daniyarov (UZB); L 1–4	Did not advance	3rd place, bronze medalist(s)
Ali Habibinejad	Men's 65 kg	—N/a	Qasim (IRQ); L 0–5	Did not advance		5
Mohammad Nourani	Men's 80 kg	Bye	Ojok (UGA); L 0–5	Did not advance		5
Ghazaleh Rasouli	Women's 51 kg	—N/a	Adeshina (NGR); L RSC	Did not advance		5
Neda Kosari	Women's 65 kg	—N/a	Kabak (TUR); L RSC	Did not advance		5

=== Duathlon ===
Athlete	Event	Time	Rank
Farid Hadipour	Men's sprint	1:01:01.7	10
Meisam Rezaei	Men's sprint	58:04.2	4
Mohammad Amin Sadramin	Men's sprint	58:14.3	5
Faezeh Abedininejad	Women's sprint	1:11:29.4	7
Reihaneh Khatouni	Women's sprint	1:12:29.5	8
Hadis Nasr Azadani	Women's sprint	1:09:52.6	6

=== Fencing ===
Épée

Athlete	Event	Pool round		Round of 32	Round of 16	Quarterfinal	Semifinal	Final	Rank
Athlete	Event	Results	Rank	Round of 32	Round of 16	Quarterfinal	Semifinal	Final	Rank
Mohammad Esmaeili	Men's individual	Al-Omairi (KSA) W 5–1; Luqman (INA) W 5–4; Mohamadou (CMR) W 5–1; Al-Jadra (QAT) L 3–4; Al-Bloushi (UAE) W 5–2	6 Q	Bukhlaif (BRN); W 15–7	Movashahi (IRI); L 9–15	Did not advance			12
Amir Hossein Movashahi	Men's individual	Khan (PAK) W 5–0; Abdulali (QAT) L 3–5; Timurov (UZB) L 4–5; Keskes (OMA) W 5–1; Erolçevik (TUR) W 5–3	11 Q	Al-Harthi (OMA); W 15–12	Esmaeili (IRI); W 15–9	Nurmatov (UZB); L 10–15	Did not advance		7
Behnam Beik; Mohammad Esmaeili; Mohammad Ali Khakzar; Amir Hossein Movashahi	Men's team	—N/a			Indonesia; W 45–29	Uzbekistan; W 45–44	Saudi Arabia; L 36–45	Did not advance	3rd place, bronze medalist(s)
Reihaneh Rezaei	Women's individual	Egamberdieva (UZB) W 5–4; Al-Zaabi (UAE) W 5–4; Guliyeva (AZE) L 4–5; Mansi (JOR) W 5–1; Khan (BRN) W 5–3	6 Q	Bye	Al-Hosani (UAE); W 15–10	Egamberdieva (UZB); L 14–15	Did not advance		7

Sabre

Athlete	Event	Pool round		Round of 32	Round of 16	Quarterfinal	Semifinal	Final	Rank
Athlete	Event	Results	Rank	Round of 32	Round of 16	Quarterfinal	Semifinal	Final	Rank
Mohammad Fotouhi	Men's individual	Huseynli (AZE) L 2–5; Kalender (TUR) W 5–2; Al-Ammari (KUW) W 5–4; Ferjani (TUN) L 2–5	13 Q	Asahrin (BRU); W 15–8	Aymuratov (UZB); W 15–14	Kodirov (UZB); L 12–15	Did not advance		8
Ali Pakdaman	Men's individual	Kodirov (UZB) W 5–1; Asahrin (BRU) W 5–0; Mammadov (AZE) W 5–1; Al-Bahrani (KSA) W 5–4	2 Q	Bye	Mubarak (UAE); W 15–9	Ferjani (TUN); L 13–15	Did not advance		5
Mohammad Fotouhi; Taha Kargarpour; Ali Pakdaman; Nima Zahedi	Men's team	—N/a				United Arab Emirates; W 45–20	Uzbekistan; L 44–45	Did not advance	3rd place, bronze medalist(s)

=== Futsal ===
Team	Event	Preliminary round				Semifinal	Final	Rank
Team	Event	Round 1	Round 2	Round 3	Rank	Semifinal	Final	Rank
Iran	Men	Morocco; D 2–2	Afghanistan; D 2–2	Tajikistan; W 4–1	2 Q	Uzbekistan; W 4–2	Morocco; W 5–0	1st place, gold medalist(s)
Roster: Bagher Mohammadi; Behzad Rasouli; Amir Hossein Gholami; Hossein Sabzi; Mohammad Hossein Derakhshani; Mohammad Hossein Bazyar; Mehdi Karimi; Moslem Oladghobad; Saeid Ahmadabbasi; Hossein Tayyebi; Ali Khalilvand; Salar Aghapour; Masoud Yousef; Behrouz Azimi; Coach: Vahid Shamsaei

=== Handball ===
Team	Event	Preliminary round				Semifinal	Final	Rank
Team	Event	Round 1	Round 2	Round 3	Rank	Semifinal	Final	Rank
Iran	Men	Qatar; L 23–39	Maldives; W 57–14	United Arab Emirates; L 25–28	3	Did not advance		5
Iran	Women	Turkey; L 28–36	Guinea; W 23–21	Maldives; W 49–13	2 Q	Kazakhstan; L 26–29	3rd place match Uzbekistan; W 29–25	3rd place, bronze medalist(s)
Roster – Men: Saber Heidari; Milad Ghalandari; Amir Hossein Firouzbakht; Yasin Kabirianjoo; Saeid Aliakbari; Mohammad Gholami; Reza Shojaei; Ali Rahimi; Kianoush Palad; Mohammad Reza Kazemi; Vahid Masoudi; Arman Rahmani; Afshin Sadeghi; Omid Reza Sarpoushi; Shahab Sadeghzadeh; Younes Asari; Coach: (Spain) Rafael Guijosa Roster – Women: Fatemeh Merikh; Hanieh Karimi; Setareh Rahmanian; Atieh Shahsavari; Fatemeh Khalili; Mina Vatanparast; Hadiseh Norouzi; Bahar Izadgashb; Aseman Badvi; Leila Hosseini; Hedieh Hafez; Arezoo Kianiara; Arezoo Mohammadi; Negar Zendehboudi; Nastaran Farahani; Sanaz Rajabi; Coach: (Portugal) Ana Seabra

=== Judo ===
Athlete	Event	Round of 16	Quarterfinal	Semifinal	Final	Rank
Abolfazl Mahmoudi	Men's 66 kg	Bobokalonov (TJK); W 003–000	Bekmurodov (UZB); L 000–001	Repechage; Boushita (MAR); L 000–001	Did not advance	7
Elias Parhizgar	Men's 81 kg	Sharahili (KSA); W 001–000	Albayrak (TUR); L 010–100	Repechage; Omarov (UAE); L 000–101	Did not advance	7
Amir Abbas Choupan	Men's 90 kg	Sagaipov (BRN); L 001–101	Did not advance			9
Samira Khakkhah	Women's 63 kg	—N/a	Yeksan (TUR); L 000–003	Repechage; Moumouni (NIG); W 110–000	3rd place match Yergaliyeva (KAZ); L 000–101	5
Maryam Barbat	Women's 70 kg	Bye	Gardashkhanli (AZE); L 000–001	Repechage; Duishonbekova (KGZ); W 100–000	3rd place match Biami (CMR); W 100–001	3rd place, bronze medalist(s)

=== Ju-jitsu ===
Jiu-jitsu

Athlete	Event	Round of 16	Quarterfinal		Semifinal	Repechage	Final	Rank
Mehran Sattar	Men's 62 kg	Shafayee (AFG); L SUB (0–0)	Did not advance		Repechage; Khabibulla (KAZ); L WO	Did not advance		9
Ali Akbarpour	Men's 85 kg	Abdulloev (TJK); L SUB (0–0)	Did not advance		Repechage; Ataie (AFG); W SUB (13–0)	Repechage; Abu Al-Ragheb (JOR); W 8–0	3rd place match Imanverdiyev (KAZ); W 2–2	3rd place, bronze medalist(s)
Pouria Taherkhani	Men's 94 kg	Haddadin (JOR); L 0–0	Repechage; Maboumba (GAB); W SUB (6–0)		Repechage; Faraj (BRN); L 2–5	Did not advance		9
Yasamin Nazari	Women's 52 kg	Group round Kulumbetova (KAZ); L 0–6	Group round El-Alami (MAR); W 7–0	Rank; 2 Q	Al-Hosani (UAE); L SUB (0–9)	—N/a	3rd place match Hammoumi (ALG); W 13–0	3rd place, bronze medalist(s)
Hasti Hamoudi	Women's 70 kg	—N/a			Round robin Obeid (PLE); L 0–14	Round robin Zhuravleva (KAZ); L SUB (0–6)	Round robin Arbib (MAR); W 10–0	3rd place, bronze medalist(s)

=== Karate ===
Athlete	Event	Round of 32	Round of 16	Quarterfinal	Semifinal	Final	Rank
Ali Meskini	Men's 60 kg	Asyrraf (MAS); W 9–1	Kalykov (KGZ); W 5–2	Bigabyl (KAZ); L 3–8	Did not advance		9
Morteza Nemati	Men's 75 kg	—N/a	Ali (PAK); W 7–0	Al-Zahrani (KSA); W 6–5	Abudabous (LBA); W 7–5	Al-Jenaei (KUW); L 4–4	2nd place, silver medalist(s)
Saleh Abazari	Men's +84 kg	—N/a		Bye	Abdulsalam (LBA); W 8–1	Sufyani (KSA); L 0–4	2nd place, silver medalist(s)
Fatemeh Sadeghi	Women's kata	—N/a		Al-Zaid (KSA); W 39.4–36.2	Al-Saied (KUW); W 39.7–36.0	Bozan (TUR); W 42.4–40.3	1st place, gold medalist(s)
Sara Bahmanyar	Women's 50 kg	—N/a	Bye	Ba (SEN); W 3–0	Adebayo (CIV); W 4–0	Alimardanova (UZB); W 6–4	1st place, gold medalist(s)
Atousa Golshadnejad	Women's 61 kg	—N/a	Bye	Mahamadou (NIG); W 9–1	Al-Khulaidi (KSA); W 10–2	Mahjoub (TUN); W 7–4	1st place, gold medalist(s)

=== Muaythai ===
Athlete	Event	Round of 16	Quarterfinal	Semifinal	Final	Rank
Masoud Abdolmaleki	Men's 65 kg	Muhiddinov (UZB); W 30–27	Aliyev (AZE); L 27–30	Did not advance		5
Hossein Farahani	Men's 75 kg	Assouik (MAR); L 27–30	Did not advance			9
Majid Hashembeigi	Men's 80 kg	—N/a	Derin (TUR); W 29–28	Sadat (AFG); W 29–28	Al-Tekreeti (IRQ); L 26–30	2nd place, silver medalist(s)
Fereshteh Hassanzadeh	Women's 50 kg	Bye	Abdukholikova (UZB); W 29–28	Keuchkarian (LBN); W 30–26	Akhlouf (MAR); L 27–30	2nd place, silver medalist(s)
Fatemeh Mamani	Women's 55 kg	Bouhmada (UAE); L 27–30	Did not advance			9
Zahra Akbari	Women's 60 kg	Asylbek Kyzy (KGZ); W 30–27	Khushvaktova (UZB); W RSCS	Al-Far (KSA); W 30–27	Kocakuş (TUR); L 28–29	2nd place, silver medalist(s)
Fatemeh Hosseini	Women's 65 kg	—N/a	El-Batal (LBN); W CCL	Mediouni (ALG); W 30–27	Tacyıldız (TUR); L 27–30	2nd place, silver medalist(s)

=== Para powerlifting ===
Athlete	Event	Result	Points	Rank
Rouhollah Rostami	Men's heavyweight	235	151.297	1st place, gold medalist(s)
Zahra Aghaei	Women's heavyweight	128	105.458	5

=== Swimming ===
Athlete	Event	Heats		Semifinals		Final	
Athlete	Event	Time	Rank	Time	Rank	Time	Rank
Samyar Abdoli	Men's 50 m freestyle	22.75	1 Q	22.53	1 Q	22.44	1st place, gold medalist(s)
Sina Gholampour	Men's 50 m freestyle	24.06	18	Did not advance			
Samyar Abdoli	Men's 100 m freestyle	52.20	11 Q	51.26	8 Q	Withdrew	9
Sina Gholampour	Men's 100 m freestyle	51.68	10 Q	51.99	13	Did not advance	
Mohammad Ghasemi	Men's 200 m freestyle	1:52.70	3 Q	—N/a		1:50.63	3rd place, bronze medalist(s)
Ali Rashidpour	Men's 200 m freestyle	1:54.20	7 Q	—N/a		1:54.53	6
Mohammad Ghasemi	Men's 400 m freestyle	4:03.91	8 Q	—N/a		3:56.45	6
Homer Abbasi	Men's 50 m backstroke	25.92	1 Q	25.88	3 Q	25.78	2nd place, silver medalist(s)
Homer Abbasi	Men's 100 m backstroke	57.27	3 Q	57.41	7 Q	57.04	7
Mohammad Mehdi Gholami	Men's 100 m backstroke	58.98	12 Q	58.89	12	Did not advance	
Samyar Abdoli	Men's 50 m breaststroke	DNS	—	Did not advance			
Arad Mehdizadeh	Men's 50 m breaststroke	28.62	4 Q	28.67	7 Q	28.53	5
Arad Mehdizadeh	Men's 100 m breaststroke	1:03.98	3 Q	1:03.18	3 Q	1:03.58	5
Arad Mehdizadeh	Men's 200 m breaststroke	2:20.03	4 Q	—N/a		2:19.55	5
Mehrshad Afghari	Men's 50 m butterfly	24.88	8 Q	24.49	7 Q	24.44	8
Matin Sohran	Men's 50 m butterfly	25.89	17	Did not advance			
Mehrshad Afghari	Men's 100 m butterfly	55.02	4 Q	54.71	7 Q	55.12	7
Mohammad Mehdi Gholami	Men's 100 m butterfly	55.47	7 Q	55.38	10	Did not advance	
Mohammad Ghasemi	Men's 200 m butterfly	2:05.36	4 Q	—N/a		Withdrew	9
Mohammad Mehdi Gholami	Men's 200 m butterfly	2:05.00	2 Q	—N/a		2:01.35	3rd place, bronze medalist(s)
Mohammad Ghasemi	Men's 400 m individual medley	DNS	—	—N/a		Did not advance	
Samyar Abdoli; Sina Gholampour; Ali Rashidpour; Mohammad Ghasemi; Matin Sohran (heats)	Men's 4 × 100 m freestyle relay	3:29.15	2 Q	—N/a		3:24.43	4
Mohammad Ghasemi; Mohammad Mehdi Gholami; Ali Rashidpour; Matin Sohran	Men's 4 × 200 m freestyle relay	—N/a				7:34.19	3rd place, bronze medalist(s)
Homer Abbasi; Arad Mehdizadeh; Mehrshad Afghari; Samyar Abdoli; Mohammad Mehdi Gholami (heats); Sina Gholampour (heats)	Men's 4 × 100 m medley relay	3:48.79	1 Q	—N/a		3:44.46	4

=== Table tennis ===
Individual

Athlete	Event	Round of 64	Round of 32	Round of 16	Quarterfinal	Semifinal	Final	Rank
Amir Hossein Hodaei	Men's singles	Bye	Johnson (GUY); W 4–0 (2, 5, 7, 4)	Guluzade (AZE); W 4–0 (10, 6, 7, 9)	Bouloussa (ALG); L 3–4 (7, 5, 2, −3, −5, −7, −4)	Did not advance		5
Mohammad Mousavi Taher	Men's singles	Ahmed (BAN); W 4–0 (6, 4, 7, 5)	Kurmangaliyev (KAZ); L 1–4 (7, −9, −6, −3, −7)	Did not advance				17
Benyamin Faraji; Amir Hossein Hodaei	Men's doubles	—N/a	Bye	Saleh and Sanad (BRN); W 3–0 (7, 10, 8)	Britton and Bryan (GUY); W 3–0 (8, 2, 2)	Yiğenler and Gündüz (TUR); L 1–3 (−10, 9, −9, −10)	Did not advance	3rd place, bronze medalist(s)
Shima Safaei	Women's singles	—N/a	Al-Khayyat (BRN); W 4–0 (3, 3, 2, 7)	Nurmatova (AZE); W 4–2 (10, 8, −9, 12, −7, 3)	Zaza (SYR); L 3–4 (5, −9, −10, 2, −9, 7, −9)	Did not advance		5
Neda Shahsavari	Women's singles	—N/a	Chiri (LBN); W 4–0 (3, 9, 3, 5)	Al-Qahtani (KSA); W 4–0 (6, 7, 3, 3)	Haraç (TUR); W 4–2 (9, −8, 12, −7, 4, 5)	Helmy (EGY); W 4–2 (6, −9, 10, 10, −11, 11)	Zaza (SYR); W 4–2 (−7, −10, 9, 9, 8, 11)	1st place, gold medalist(s)
Shima Safaei; Neda Shahsavari	Women's doubles	—N/a		Edghill and Billingy (GUY); W 3–0 (3, 5, 4)	Kudusova and Muratalieva (KGZ); W 3–1 (9, −9, 7, 6)	Nakawala and Nangonzi (UGA); W 3–1 (−9, 3, 2, 8)	Haraç and Yılmaz (TUR); W 3–1 (−9, 6, 9, 8)	1st place, gold medalist(s)

Team

Athlete	Event	Preliminary round			Quarterfinal	Semifinal	Final	Rank
Athlete	Event	Round 1	Round 2	Rank	Quarterfinal	Semifinal	Final	Rank
Benyamin Faraji; Amir Hossein Hodaei; Mohammad Mousavi Taher	Men's team	Maldives; W 8–0	Qatar; W 8–1	1 Q	Saudi Arabia; W 8–1	Algeria; W 8–5	Kazakhstan; L 1–8	2nd place, silver medalist(s)
Setayesh Iloukhani; Shima Safaei; Neda Shahsavari	Women's team	Lebanon; W 8–2	Bahrain; W 8–0	1 Q	Uganda; W 8–1	Turkey; L 2–8	Did not advance	3rd place, bronze medalist(s)

=== Taekwondo ===
Athlete	Event	Round of 16	Quarterfinal	Semifinal	Final	Rank
Amir Mohammad Nassirahmadi	Men's 54 kg	Al-Mushraf (KSA); L 1–2 (13–5, 11–15, 8–10)	Did not advance	Repechage; Dağdelen (TUR); L 0–2 (10–11, 6–7)	Did not advance	7
Ali Asghar Alimoradian	Men's 60 kg	Betel (CHA); W 2–0 (8–0, 10–3)	Diakité (CIV); W 2–0 (14–8, 8–2)	Selim (EGY); W 2–0 (6–1, 11–4)	Rezaee (AFG); W 2–1 (0–1, 15^{P}–0, 6–3)	1st place, gold medalist(s)
Hamed Asghari	Men's 67 kg	Diop (SEN); W RSC (7–3, 9–1)	Nashash (JOR); W 2–0 (5–4, 3–0)	Dayıoğlu (TUR); L 0–2 (7–15, 2–6)	3rd place match Kobenan (CIV); L 0–2 (3–7, 2–5)	5
Ali Khoshravesh	Men's 74 kg	Al-Hooti (BRN); W 2–0 (12–0, 15–2)	Kosimkhojiev (UZB); L 1–2 (1–11, 5–4, 6–8)	Did not advance	3rd place match Aghayev (AZE); W 2–0 (4–1, 10^{P}–0)	3rd place, bronze medalist(s)
Amir Reza Sadeghian	Men's 82 kg	Kılıç (TUR); W 2–0 (10–5, 2–0)	Sawadogo (BUR); W 2–1 (4–7, 8–7, 15–13)	El-Sharabaty (JOR); W 2–1 (3–1, 0–1, 1–0)	Zarhouti (MAR); L 0–2 (2–6, 8–9)	2nd place, silver medalist(s)
Ali Ahmadi	Men's +82 kg	Al-Doseri (BRN); W 2–0 (3–0, 9–0)	Ateşli (TUR); L 0–2 (1–2, 4–11)	Did not advance		8
Sayna Karimi	Women's 46 kg	Pugantsova (KAZ); W 2–0 (15–1, 12–0)	Göğebakan (TUR); W 2–0 (4–1, 9–5)	Zakari (NIG); W 2–0 (13–11, 11–9)	Akbarova (AZE); W 2–0 (2–1, 7–6)	1st place, gold medalist(s)
Rojan Goudarzi	Women's 51 kg	Shailoobekova (KGZ); W 2–0 (5–0, 6–0)	Akgül (TUR); L 1–2 (0–0, 4–11, 5–7)	Did not advance	3rd place match Khasanova (UZB); W 2–0 (2–0, 8–2)	3rd place, bronze medalist(s)
Hasti Mohammadi	Women's 57 kg	Bekmurzaeva (KGZ); W 2–0 (4–3, 12–0)	İlgün (TUR); L 1–2 (2–15, 7–5, 3–6)	Did not advance	3rd place match Mirabzalova (UZB); W 2–1 (1–9, 11–5, 17–2)	3rd place, bronze medalist(s)
Fatemeh Eskandarnia	Women's 63 kg	Azizova (UZB); L 0–2 (6–9, 4–17)	Did not advance			11
Yalda Valinejad	Women's 70 kg	Bye	Gençer (TUR); W 2–0 (10–5, 10–9)	Anyanacho (NGR); W 2–1 (3–0, 4–9, 4–4)	Sobirjonova (UZB); L 1–2 (4–9, 8–7, 7–8)	2nd place, silver medalist(s)
Melika Mirhosseini	Women's +70 kg	—N/a	Mohammed (QAT); W 2–0 (1–0, 9–1)	Osipova (UZB); L 1–2 (0–0, 4–4, 7–7)	3rd place match Ali (PAK); W 2–0 (5–1, 11–2)	3rd place, bronze medalist(s)

=== Volleyball ===
Team	Event	Round robin						Final	Rank
Team	Event	Round 1	Round 2	Round 3	Round 4	Round 5	Rank	Final	Rank
Iran	Men	Bahrain; W 3–2 (25–21, 22–25, 25–16, 22–25, 15–7)	Qatar; W 3–0 (25–22, 25–15, 25–18)	Turkey; W 3–1 (21–25, 25–23, 25–20, 25–16)	Chad; W 3–0 (25–15, 25–19, 25–19)	Saudi Arabia; W 3–1 (25–17, 25–21, 23–25, 25–18)	1 Q	Turkey; W 3–1 (25–20, 25–20, 17–25, 25–17)	1st place, gold medalist(s)
Iran	Women	Azerbaijan; L 0–3 (11–25, 16–25, 24–26)	Turkey; L 0–3 (19–25, 16–25, 13–25)	Afghanistan; W 3–0 (25–9, 25–10, 25–8)	Tajikistan; W 3–0 (25–11, 25–8, 25–14)	—N/a	3 QB	3rd place match Tajikistan; W 3–0 (25–2, 25–7, 25–8)	3rd place, bronze medalist(s)
Roster – Men: Amir Reza Aftab Azari; Amir Hossein Sadati; Alireza Moslehabadi; Ehsan Daneshdoust; Mohammad Reza Hazratpour; Yousef Kazemi; Pouya Ariakhah; Alireza Abdolhamidi; Ali Ramezani; Arshia Behnejad; Ali Hajipour; Eisa Nasseri; Coach: Peyman Akbari Roster – Women: Aytak Salamat; Zahra Salehi; Shaghayegh Hassankhani; Reihaneh Karimi; Zahra Karimi; Fatemeh Khalili; Zahra Moghani; Elaheh Poursaleh; Sepinoud Dastbarjan; Masoumeh Ghadami; Kimia Kiani; Ghazaleh Boustan; Coach: (South Korea) Lee Do-hee

=== Weightlifting ===
Athlete	Event	Snatch		Clean & Jerk		Total	
Athlete	Event	Result	Rank	Result	Rank	Result	Rank
Hafez Ghashghaei	Men's 65 kg	126	7	166	4	292	6
Ilia Salehipour	Men's 88 kg	162	1st place, gold medalist(s)	197	3rd place, bronze medalist(s)	359	2nd place, silver medalist(s)
Alireza Moeini	Men's 94 kg	171	2nd place, silver medalist(s)	203	3rd place, bronze medalist(s)	374	2nd place, silver medalist(s)
Alireza Nassiri	Men's 110 kg	NM	—	224	2nd place, silver medalist(s)	NM	—
Reza Hassanpour	Men's +110 kg	182	4	243	3rd place, bronze medalist(s)	425	3rd place, bronze medalist(s)
Zahra Pouramin	Women's 48 kg	63	5	77	4	140	4
Reihaneh Karimi	Women's 69 kg	95	6	126	3rd place, bronze medalist(s)	221	3rd place, bronze medalist(s)
Zahra Hosseini	Women's 77 kg	97	3rd place, bronze medalist(s)	116	6	213	6
Mahsa Beheshti	Women's 86 kg	104	3rd place, bronze medalist(s)	134	1st place, gold medalist(s)	238	3rd place, bronze medalist(s)
Sara Safaverdi	Women's +86 kg	105	4	122	7	227	5

=== Wrestling ===
Freestyle

Athlete	Event	Round of 16	Quarterfinal	Semifinal	Final	Rank
Ali Momeni	Men's 57 kg	Bye	Bazarganov (AZE); L 2–4	Repechage; Tambi (CMR); W WO	3rd place match Zazai (AFG); W 11–0	3rd place, bronze medalist(s)
Rahman Amouzad	Men's 65 kg	Hassani (AFG); W 11–0	Jalolov (UZB); W 4–0	Rahimzade (AZE); W 7–0	Kudiev (TJK); W 12–2	1st place, gold medalist(s)
Younes Emami	Men's 74 kg	Bye	Toktomambetov (KGZ); W 5–2	Kaipanov (KAZ); W 6–5	Novruzov (AZE); W 5–0	1st place, gold medalist(s)
Kamran Ghasempour	Men's 86 kg	Dzhioev (AZE); L 3–5	Did not advance	Repechage; Benferdjallah (ALG); W 11–0	3rd place match Evloev (TJK); W 8–0	3rd place, bronze medalist(s)
Amir Ali Azarpira	Men's 97 kg	Ahmadi (AFG); W 11–0	Gulzar (PAK); W 11–0	Gıdak (TUR); W 11–0	Aitmukhan (KAZ); W 5–0	1st place, gold medalist(s)
Amir Hossein Zare	Men's 125 kg	—N/a	Turdubekov (KGZ); W 11–0	Büyükçıngıl (TUR); W 7–0	Sharipov (BRN); W 10–0	1st place, gold medalist(s)

Greco-Roman

Athlete	Event	Round of 16	Quarterfinal		Semifinal	Final	Rank
Ali Ahmadi Vafa	Men's 60 kg	Bye	Azizov (TJK); W 10–4		Ganiev (UZB); L 0–8	3rd place match Mammadli (AZE); W 3–2	3rd place, bronze medalist(s)
Saeid Esmaeili	Men's 67 kg	Bye	Mohammadi (QAT); W 8–0		Khalmakhanov (UZB); W 9–0	Jafarov (AZE); W 8–3	1st place, gold medalist(s)
Amir Abdi	Men's 77 kg	Ganizade (AZE); W 9–0	Zuhurov (TJK); W 8–0		Aliev (UZB); W 6–0	Makhmudov (KGZ); L Fall (1–6)	2nd place, silver medalist(s)
Gholamreza Farrokhi	Men's 87 kg	Bye	Abbasov (AZE); W 3–0		Zhanyshov (KGZ); W 7–6	Yevloyev (KAZ); W 6–0	1st place, gold medalist(s)
Mohammad Hadi Saravi	Men's 97 kg	—N/a	Rouabah (ALG); W 7–1		Fallatah (KSA); W 9–0	Ahmadiyev (AZE); W 5–1	1st place, gold medalist(s)
Fardin Hedayati	Men's 130 kg	Group round Mohamed (EGY); W 3–0	Group round Kandelaki (AZE); W 8–0	Rank; 1 Q	Kim (KGZ); W 9–0	Mohamed (EGY); W Fall (9–0)	1st place, gold medalist(s)

=== Wushu ===
Athlete	Event	Round of 16	Quarterfinal	Semifinal	Final	Rank
Amir Hossein Hemmati	Men's 60 kg	Şahin (TUR); W 2–0	Zakarea (SUD); W 2–0	Kanybek Uulu (KGZ); W 2–0	Hamoda (EGY); W 2–0	1st place, gold medalist(s)
Erfan Moharrami	Men's 70 kg	Kandil (EGY); W 2–0	Hussain (PAK); W PD	Sultani (AFG); W 2–0	Khakimov (KGZ); W 2–0	1st place, gold medalist(s)
Farbod Taleshi	Men's 85 kg	Aitakhunov (KAZ); W PD	Abbasov (AZE); W 2–0	Majjadi (TUN); W 2–0	Wahdan (EGY); L KO	2nd place, silver medalist(s)
Sara Shafiei	Women's 56 kg	Bye	Kurmanbekova (KGZ); W PD	Tut (TUR); W 2–0	Hamdy (EGY); W TV	1st place, gold medalist(s)
Soheila Mansourian	Women's 60 kg	—N/a	Bye	Dridi (TUN); W PD	Ramadan (EGY); W 2–0	1st place, gold medalist(s)
Shahrbanoo Mansourian	Women's 70 kg	Bye	Salameh (LBN); W 2–0	Mohamed (EGY); L 0–2	Did not advance	3rd place, bronze medalist(s)
