= 3x3 basketball at the 2025 Islamic Solidarity Games =

- Venue: Saudi Arabian Olympic Committee Complex Green Hall 1
- Dates: 17—19 November 2025
- Competitors: 64 from 9 nations

The 3x3 basketball tournament at the 2025 Islamic Solidarity Games in Riyadh was held between 17—19 November 2025. The 3x3 basketball competition took place at Saudi Arabian Olympic Committee Complex Green Hall 1 in Saudi Arabia.

== Participating nations ==
A total of 64 athletes from 9 nations competed in futsal at the 2025 Islamic Solidarity Games:

1. Algeria (8)
2. Azerbaijan (4)
3. Bahrain (4)
4. Ivory Coast (8)
5. Egypt (8)
6. Iran (8)
7. Qatar (8)
8. Saudi Arabia (8)
9. Turkey (8)

== Medal table ==
* Host nation (Saudi Arabia)

Rank	Nation	Gold	Silver	Bronze	Total
1	Egypt	1	0	1	2
2	Azerbaijan	1	0	0	1
3	Iran	0	1	0	1
3	Turkey	0	1	0	1
5	Qatar	0	0	1	1
Totals (5 entries)		2	2	2	6

== Medalists ==
Event	Gold	Silver	Bronze
Men	Egypt; Yahya Ahmed Mohamed; Mohab Abdalatif; Youssef Helmy; Ramy Basha	Iran; Majid Rahimian; Alireza Sharifi; Amirhossein Yazarloo; Piter Girgoorian	Qatar; Dejan Janjić; Ahmad Mohamed; Nedim Muslić; Meho Haračić
Women	Azerbaijan; Dina Ulyanova; Tatyana Deniskina; Alexandra Mollenhauer; Brianna Fraser	Turkey; Ceren Akpınar; Damla Gezgin; Selin Rachel Gül; Selen İrem Baş	Egypt; Farida Mossad; Hala El Shaarawy; Malak Gamaleldin; Sandy Abdellatif

== Men ==
=== Preliminary round ===
==== Group A ====
Pos	Team	Pld	W	L	PF	PA	PR
1	Bahrain	3	3	0	42	24	1.750
2	Egypt	3	2	1	32	34	0.941
3	Saudi Arabia	3	1	2	38	53	0.717
4	Algeria	3	0	3	13	14	0.929

Source: isg2025

17 November 2025
17:50

Boxscore

Algeria	13–14	Saudi Arabia
Pts: Yahiaoui 8		Pts: Barnawi 8

Sports Boulevard, Riyadh
Referees: Murat Ciner (TUR), Eddie Liu (MAS)

17 November 2025
18:15

Boxscore

Egypt	13–21	Bahrain
Pts: Helmy 7		Pts: Dragović 10

Sports Boulevard, Riyadh
Referees: Murat Ciner (TUR), Alexandr Rulyov (KAZ)

17 November 2025
21:35

Boxscore

Saudi Arabia	11–21	Bahrain
Pts: Al-Khater 4		Pts: Supica 9

Sports Boulevard, Riyadh
Referees: Nadia El Hefnawy (EGY), Silver Houngbedji (BEN)

17 November 2025 (Note: The Algerian Basketball Federation announced the national team's withdrawal from the Games after injuries to two players (out of 4), Mokhfi and Aouana. As tournament regulations prohibit any player replacements at this point.)
22:00

Boxscore

Algeria	vs.	Egypt

Sports Boulevard, Riyadh

18 November 2025
17:50

Boxscore

Egypt	19–13	Saudi Arabia
Pts: Mohab Yasser 9		Pts: Ashoor 6

Sports Boulevard, Riyadh
Referees: Murat Ciner (TUR), Abdelhamid Lamara Mohammed (ALG)

18 November 2025
18:15

Boxscore

Bahrain	vs.	Algeria

Sports Boulevard, Riyadh

==== Group B ====
Pos	Team	Pld	W	L	PF	PA	PR
1	Qatar	3	2	1	57	49	1.163
2	Iran	3	2	1	49	45	1.089
3	Ivory Coast	3	2	1	43	41	1.049
4	Turkey	3	0	3	42	56	0.750

Source: isg2025

17 November 2025
19:30

Boxscore

Qatar	21–13	Ivory Coast
Pts: Janjić 11		Pts: Guede 4

Sports Boulevard, Riyadh
Referees: Karim Soliman (EGY), Nadia El Hefnawy (EGY)

17 November 2025
19:55

Boxscore

Turkey	14–21	Iran
Pts: Seviğ, Gök 6		Pts: Rahimian 9

Sports Boulevard, Riyadh
Referees: Monicca Nassuuna (UGA), Nadia El Hefnawy (EGY)

18 November 2025
19:30

Boxscore

Ivory Coast	16–12	Iran
Pts: Souaré 7		Pts: Girgoorian 5

Sports Boulevard, Riyadh

18 November 2025
20:20

Boxscore

Qatar	21–20	Turkey
Pts: Muslić 8		Pts: Gök 7

Sports Boulevard, Riyadh
Referees: Alexandr Rulyov (KAZ), Silver Houngbedji (BEN)

18 November 2025
21:35

Boxscore

Turkey	8–14	Ivory Coast
Pts: Bozveli 5		Pts: Diarra 6

Sports Boulevard, Riyadh
Referees: Karim Soliman (EGY), Silver Houngbedji (BEN)

18 November 2025
22:00

Boxscore

Iran	16–15	Qatar
Pts: Girgoorian 8		Pts: Janjić 8

Sports Boulevard, Riyadh
Referees: Karim Soliman (EGY), Nadia El Hefnawy (EGY)

=== Final round ===
Semifinals
19 November
Bahrain	18
Iran	21
19 November
Qatar	13
Egypt	21

Gold medal match
19 November
Iran	14
Egypt	21
Bronze medal match
19 November
Bahrain	15
Qatar	17

==== Semifinals ====
19 November 2025
17:50

Boxscore

Bahrain	18–21	Iran
Pts: Dragović 9		Pts: Girgoorian 9

Sports Boulevard, Riyadh
Referees: Murat Ciner (TUR), Karim Soliman (EGY)

19 November 2025
18:15

Boxscore

Qatar	13–21	Egypt
Pts: Janjić 8		Pts: Ahmed Yasser 8

Sports Boulevard, Riyadh
Referees: Alexandr Rulyov (KAZ), Eddie Liu (MAS)

==== Bronze medal match ====
19 November 2025
19:05

Boxscore

Bahrain	15–17	Qatar
Pts: Supica 9		Pts: Janjić 11

Sports Boulevard, Riyadh
Referees: Alexandr Rulyov (KAZ), Karim Soliman (EGY)

==== Gold medal match ====
19 November 2025
18:15

Boxscore

Iran	14–21	Egypt
Pts: Sharifi 5		Pts: Mohab Yasser, Youssef Helmy 8

Sports Boulevard, Riyadh
Referees: Murat Ciner (TUR), Silver Houngbedji (BEN)

== Women ==
=== Preliminary round ===
==== Group A ====
Pos	Team	Pld	W	L	PF	PA	PR
1	Azerbaijan	3	3	0	61	35	1.743
2	Turkey	3	2	1	50	45	1.111
3	Ivory Coast	3	1	2	42	52	0.808
4	Saudi Arabia (H)	3	0	3	32	53	0.604

Updated to match(es) played on 20 November 2025. Source: isg2025
(H) Hosts

17 November 2025
17:00

Boxscore

Azerbaijan	21–8	Saudi Arabia
Pts: Mollenhauer 12		Pts: Al-Khatlan 5

Sports Boulevard, Riyadh
Referees: Abdelhamid Lamara Mohammed (ALG), Karim Soliman (EGY)

17 November 2025
17:25

Boxscore

Turkey	21–12	Ivory Coast
Pts: Gül 8		Pts: Traoré 6

Sports Boulevard, Riyadh
Referees: Alexandr Rulyov (KAZ), Eddie Liu (MAS)

17 November
20:45

Saudi Arabia	10–16	Ivory Coast

Sports Boulevard, Riyadh

17 November
21:10

Azerbaijan	19–13	Turkey

Sports Boulevard, Riyadh

18 November
17:00

Turkey	16–14	Saudi Arabia

Sports Boulevard, Riyadh

18 November
17:25

Ivory Coast	14–21	Azerbaijan

Sports Boulevard, Riyadh

==== Group B ====
Pos	Team	Pld	W	L	PF	PA	PR
1	Iran	1	1	0	21	14	1.500
2	Algeria	1	1	0	16	11	1.455
3	Qatar	1	0	1	11	16	0.688
4	Egypt	1	0	1	14	21	0.667

Updated to match(es) played on 17 November 2025. Source: isg2025

17 November 2025
18:40

Boxscore

Egypt	14–21	Iran
Pts: ElShaarawy 7		Pts: Rasoulipour 10

Sports Boulevard, Riyadh
Referees: Alexandr Rulyov (KAZ), Abdelhamid Lamara Mohammed (ALG)

17 November 2025
19:05

Boxscore

Algeria	16–11	Qatar
Pts: Drici 6		Pts: Elsayed 6

Sports Boulevard, Riyadh
Referees: Murat Ciner (TUR), Eddie Liu (MAS)

18 November
18:40

Iran	21–7	Qatar

Sports Boulevard, Riyadh

18 November
19:05

Egypt	19–3	Algeria

Sports Boulevard, Riyadh

18 November
20:45

Algeria	9–19	Iran

Sports Boulevard, Riyadh

18 November
21:10

Qatar	8–21	Egypt

Sports Boulevard, Riyadh

=== Final round ===
Semifinals
19 November
Azerbaijan	22
Egypt	15
19 November
Turkey	14
Iran	11

Gold medal match
19 November
Azerbaijan	21
Turkey	13
Bronze medal match
19 November
Egypt	21
Iran	16

==== Semifinals ====
19 November
17:00

Azerbaijan	22–15	Egypt

Sports Boulevard, Riyadh

19 November
17:25

Iran	11–14	Turkey

Sports Boulevard, Riyadh

==== Bronze medal match ====
19 November
18:40

Egypt	21–16	Iran

Sports Boulevard, Riyadh

==== Gold medal match ====
19 November
19:30

Azerbaijan	21–13	Turkey

Sports Boulevard, Riyadh
