= Syria at the Islamic Solidarity Games =

- IOC code: SYR
- NOC: Syrian Olympic Committee
- Medals Ranked 22nd: Gold 7 Silver 6 Bronze 15 Total 28

Islamic Solidarity Games appearances (overview)
- 2005; 2013; 2017; 2021; 2025

Syria has competed in all editions of the Islamic Solidarity Games since its debut appearance at the inaugural event in Mecca in 2005. As of 2025, figures reported by the Islamic Solidarity Sports Federation indicate that athletes from Syria have earned a total of 28 medals, comprising 7 gold, 6 silver, and 15 bronze. In the overall standings, Syria ranks 22nd in the medal table following the most recent Islamic Solidarity Games, which were hosted in Riyadh, Saudi Arabia.

== Medal tables ==
=== Medals by Islamic Solidarity Games ===
Host nation

Below is the table representing all Syrian medals in the games. Until now, Syria has won 28 medals (7 gold, 6 silver, and 15 bronze).

Games	Athletes	Gold	Silver	Bronze	Total	Rank	Notes	RF
(Saudi Arabia) 2005 Mecca		3	2	5	10	10th	details	
(Iran) 2010 Tehran	Canceled							
(Indonesia) 2013 Palembang		2	1	3	6	12th	details	
(Azerbaijan) 2017 Baku		2	2	6	10	18th	details	
(Turkey) 2021 Konya		0	0	0	0	-	details	
(Saudi Arabia) 2025 Riyadh		0	1	1	2	33rd	details	
(Malaysia) 2029 Selangor	Future event							
Total		7	6	15	28	22nd	―	―

== See also ==
- Syria at the Olympics
- Syria at the Paralympics
- Syria at the Asian Games
- Syria at the Arab Games
- Sports in Syria
