= Pakistan at the 2025 Islamic Solidarity Games =

- IOC code: PAK
- NOC: National Olympic Committee of Pakistan

in Riyadh, Saudi Arabia
- Competitors: 54 in 10 sports
- Medals Ranked 24th: Gold 1 Silver 1 Bronze 3 Total 5

Islamic Solidarity Games appearances (overview)
- 2005; 2013; 2017; 2021; 2025

Pakistan participated in the 2025 Islamic Solidarity Games, which were held from 7 to 21 November 2025 in Riyadh, Saudi Arabia. Pakistan secured a total of five medals at the Games, placing 24th on the medal table. The country’s lone gold came from javelin thrower Arshad Nadeem, while Yasir Sultan added a silver in the same event. Pakistan also claimed three bronze medals through boxers Fatima Zahra and Qudratullah, and wrestler Muhammad Gulzar. Additionally, Arusha Saeed earned a bronze in the women’s 57 kg Kurash event; however, since Kurash was held as a demonstration sport, its medals were not counted in the official standings.

== Competitors ==
| Sport | Men | Women | Total |
|---|---|---|---|
| Athletics | 3 | 0 | 3 |
| Boxing | 1 | 3 | 4 |
| Fencing | 6 | 0 | 6 |
| Ju-jitsu | 2 | 1 | 3 |
| Karate | 3 | 2 | 5 |
| Swimming | 4 | 4 | 8 |
| Table tennis | 2 | 3 | 5 |
| Taekwondo | 6 | 4 | 10 |
| Wrestling | 4 | 0 | 4 |
| Wushu | 3 | 3 | 6 |
| Total | 34 | 20 | 54 |

== Medalists ==
Medals by sport
| Sport | 1st place, gold medalist(s) | 2nd place, silver medalist(s) | 3rd place, bronze medalist(s) | Total |
| Athletics | 1 | 1 | 0 | 2 |
| Boxing | 0 | 0 | 2 | 2 |
| Wrestling | 0 | 0 | 1 | 1 |
| Total | 1 | 1 | 3 | 5 |

| Medal | Name | Sport | Event | Date |
|---|---|---|---|---|
| Gold | Arshad Nadeem | Athletics | Men's javelin throw | 19 November |
| Silver | Muhammad Yasir | Athletics | Men's javelin throw | 19 November |
| Bronze | Qutrad Ullah | Boxing | Men's 55 kg | 9 November |
| Bronze | Fatima Zahra | Boxing | Women's 60 kg | 9 November |
| Bronze | Muhammad Gulzar | Wrestling | Men's freestyle 97 kg | 21 November |

== Athletics ==
Field Events

| Athlete | Event | Final | |
| Athlete | Event | Distance | Rank |
|---|---|---|---|
| Arshad Nadeem | Men's Javelin Throw | 83.05 m | Gold |
| Muhammad Yasir | Men's Javelin Throw | 76.04 m | Silver |
| Sharoz Khan | Men's High Jump | 2.08 m | 4 |

== Boxing ==
| Athlete | Category | Quarterfinals | Semifinals | Final | |
| Athlete | Category | Opponent Result | Opponent Result | Opponent Result | Rank |
|---|---|---|---|---|---|
| Qutrad Ullah | Men's 55 kg | Othman (SUD); RSC-I R3 | Amir Kelany (EGY); L 2-3 | Did not advance | Bronze |
| Maria Rind | Women's 51 kg | Topuz (TUR); L 0-5 | Did not advance | | 5 |
| Laura Akram | Women's 57 kg | Mamajonova (UZB); L 0-5 | Did not advance | | 5 |
| Fatima Zahra | Women's 60 kg | Melissa (ALG); W 5-0 | Ismoilova (UZB); L 2-3 | Did not advance | Bronze |

== Wrestling ==
Men's freestyle

| Athlete | Category | Round of 16 | Quarterfinals | Semifinals | Repechage | Final / BM | |
| Athlete | Category | Opponent Result | Opponent Result | Opponent Result | Opponent Result | Opponent Result | Rank |
|---|---|---|---|---|---|---|---|
| Muhammad Abdullah | 65 kg | Jalolov (UZB); L 0-10 | Did not advance | | | | 13 |
| Inayat Ullah | 74 kg | Asluev (BHR); L 1-8 | Did not advance | | | | 10 |
| Haider Ali Butt | 86 kg | Zada (AFG); L 4-8 | Did not advance | | | | 10 |
| Muhammad Gulzar | 97 kg | Bye | Azarpira (IRI); L 0-11 | Did not advance | Ahmadi (AFG); W WO | Gıdak (TUR); W 4^{F}-5 | Bronze |
