= Table tennis at the 2025 Islamic Solidarity Games =

Table tennis competition

- Venue: Boulevard City
- Dates: 8—13 November 2025
- Competitors: 29 from 111 nations

The table tennis tournament at the 2025 Islamic Solidarity Games in Riyadh was held between 8—13 November 2025. The table tennis competition took place at Boulevard City in Saudi Arabia.

== Medal table ==
* Host nation (Saudi Arabia)

Rank	Nation	Gold	Silver	Bronze	Total
1	Turkey	2	2	2	6
2	Iran	2	1	2	5
3	Kazakhstan	2	0	0	2
4	Egypt	1	1	1	3
5	Algeria	0	1	2	3
6	Bangladesh	0	1	0	1
6	Syria	0	1	0	1
8	Azerbaijan	0	0	2	2
9	Bahrain	0	0	1	1
9	Maldives	0	0	1	1
9	Saudi Arabia*	0	0	1	1
9	Tajikistan	0	0	1	1
9	Uganda	0	0	1	1
Totals (13 entries)		7	7	14	28

== Medal summary ==
Event	Gold	Silver	Bronze
Men's singles	Kirill Gerassimenko; Kazakhstan	Omar Assar; Egypt	Mehdi Bouloussa; Algeria
Men's singles	Kirill Gerassimenko; Kazakhstan	Omar Assar; Egypt	Sadi Ismailov; Tajikistan
Men's doubles	Turkey; İbrahim Gündüz; Abdullah Talha Yiğenler	Algeria; Bella Maheidine; Jellouli Milhane Amine	Iran; Benyamin Faraji; Seyedmohammad Mousavitaher
Men's doubles	Turkey; İbrahim Gündüz; Abdullah Talha Yiğenler	Algeria; Bella Maheidine; Jellouli Milhane Amine	Saudi Arabia; Ali Al-Khadrawi; Abdulaziz Bu Shulaybi
Men's team	Kazakhstan; Kirill Gerassimenko; Alan Kurmangaliyev; Aidos Kenzhigulov	Iran; Benyamin Faraji; Amir Hossein Hodaei; Seyedmohammad Mousavitaher	Turkey; İbrahim Gündüz; Abdullah Talha Yiğenler; Tugay Şirzat Yılmaz
Men's team	Kazakhstan; Kirill Gerassimenko; Alan Kurmangaliyev; Aidos Kenzhigulov	Iran; Benyamin Faraji; Amir Hossein Hodaei; Seyedmohammad Mousavitaher	Algeria; Bella Maheidine; Mehdi Bouloussa; Jellouli Milhane Amine
Women's singles	Neda Shahsavari; Iran	Hend Zaza; Syria	Sibel Altınkaya; Turkey
Women's singles	Neda Shahsavari; Iran	Hend Zaza; Syria	Yousra Abdelrazek; Egypt
Women's doubles	Iran; Shima Safaei; Neda Shahsavari	Turkey; Özge Yılmaz; Ece Haraç	Maldives; Aishath Rafa Nazim; Fathimath Dheema Ali
Women's doubles	Iran; Shima Safaei; Neda Shahsavari	Turkey; Özge Yılmaz; Ece Haraç	Uganda; Jemima Nakawala; Judith Nangonzi
Women's team	Egypt; Yousra Abdelrazek; Hend Abdelhalim; Marwa Alhodaby	Turkey; Sibel Altınkaya; Özge Yılmaz; Ece Haraç	Iran; Neda Shahsavari; Setayesh Iloukhani; Shima Safaei
Women's team	Egypt; Yousra Abdelrazek; Hend Abdelhalim; Marwa Alhodaby	Turkey; Sibel Altınkaya; Özge Yılmaz; Ece Haraç	Azerbaijan; Aylin Asgarova; Marziyya Nurmatova; Zemfira Mikayilova
Mixed doubles	Turkey; Sibel Altınkaya; İbrahim Gündüz	Bangladesh; Md Javed Ahmed; Khoy Khoy Sai Marma	Azerbaijan; Marziyya Nurmatova; Adil Ahmadzada
Mixed doubles	Turkey; Sibel Altınkaya; İbrahim Gündüz	Bangladesh; Md Javed Ahmed; Khoy Khoy Sai Marma	Bahrain; Kenda Mohamed; Rashed Rashed

== Participating nations ==
A total of 108 athletes from 29 nations competed in table tennis at the 2025 Islamic Solidarity Games:

1. Afghanistan (2)
2. Albania (1)
3. Algeria (3)
4. Azerbaijan (6)
5. Bahrain (6)
6. Bangladesh (5)
7. Cameroon (2)
8. Djibouti (2)
9. Egypt (4)
10. Guyana (5)
11. Iran (6)
12. Kazakhstan (3)
13. Kyrgyzstan (6)
14. Libya (1)
15. Lebanon (4)
16. Morocco (2)
17. Maldives (6)
18. Mauritania (2)
19. Nigeria (4)
20. Pakistan (5)
21. Qatar (3)
22. Saudi Arabia (6)
23. Sierra Leone (4)
24. Sudan (2)
25. Syria (1)
26. Tajikistan (5)
27. Togo (2)
28. Turkey (6)
29. Uganda (6)
