= Wushu at the 2025 Islamic Solidarity Games =

- Venue: Boulevard City 1
- Dates: 15—16 November 2025
- Competitors: 81 from 22 nations

The wushu tournament at the 2025 Islamic Solidarity Games in Riyadh was held between 15—16 November 2025. The wushu competition took place at Boulevard City 1 in Saudi Arabia.

== Medal table ==
* Host nation (Saudi Arabia)

Rank	Nation	Gold	Silver	Bronze	Total
1	Iran	4	1	1	6
2	Egypt	2	3	0	5
3	Kyrgyzstan	0	1	2	3
4	Turkey	0	1	1	2
5	Tunisia	0	0	2	2
6	Afghanistan	0	0	1	1
6	Azerbaijan	0	0	1	1
6	Bangladesh	0	0	1	1
6	Ivory Coast	0	0	1	1
6	Kazakhstan	0	0	1	1
Totals (10 entries)		6	6	11	23

== Medal overview ==
=== Men's sanda ===
Event	Gold	Silver	Bronze
60 kg	Amirhossein Hemati; Iran	Youssif Hamoda; Egypt	Elchin Eminov; Azerbaijan
60 kg	Amirhossein Hemati; Iran	Youssif Hamoda; Egypt	Dastan Kanybek Uulu; Kyrgyzstan
70 kg	Erfan Moharrami; Iran	Abror Khakimov; Kyrgyzstan	Mohammad Jafar Sultani; Afghanistan
70 kg	Erfan Moharrami; Iran	Abror Khakimov; Kyrgyzstan	Rafkhat Zeripov; Kazakhstan
85 kg	Alhussein Wahdan; Egypt	Farbod Taleshi; Iran	Mondher Majjadi; Tunisia
85 kg	Alhussein Wahdan; Egypt	Farbod Taleshi; Iran	Temirlan Amankulov; Kyrgyzstan

=== Women's sanda ===
Event	Gold	Silver	Bronze
56 kg	Sara Ganje; Iran	Shahd Abdelsadek; Egypt	Berna Tut; Turkey
56 kg	Sara Ganje; Iran	Shahd Abdelsadek; Egypt	Shika Khatun; Bangladesh
60 kg	Soheila Mansourian; Iran	Habiba Abouomar; Egypt	Eya Dridi; Tunisia
60 kg	Soheila Mansourian; Iran	Habiba Abouomar; Egypt	not awarded
70 kg	Mennatallah Aly; Egypt	Sudenaz Gülay; Turkey	Tonhon Haba; Ivory Coast
70 kg	Mennatallah Aly; Egypt	Sudenaz Gülay; Turkey	Shahrbanoo Mansourian; Iran

== Participating nations ==
A total of 75 athletes from 21 nations competed in wushu at the 2025 Islamic Solidarity Games:

1. Afghanistan (3)
2. Algeria (3)
3. Azerbaijan (4)
4. Bangladesh (6)
5. Ivory Coast (3)
6. Egypt (6)
7. Gabon (1)
8. Iran (6)
9. Jordan (1)
10. Kazakhstan (6)
11. Kyrgyzstan (4)
12. Lebanon (2)
13. Libya (1)
14. Niger (4)
15. Pakistan (6)
16. Palestine (2)
17. Saudi Arabia (4)
18. Sudan (3)
19. Tunisia (4)
20. Turkey (4)
21. Yemen (2)

== Results ==
=== Men's sanda ===
==== 60 kg ====
Round of 16
Elchin Eminov (AZE)	2
Shamsuddin Haji Zada (AFG)	0
Youssif Hamoda (EGY)	2
Md Milon Ali (BAN)	0
Muhammad Awais (PAK)	1
Dastan Kanybek Uulu (KGZ)	2
Berkay Şahin (TUR)	0
Amirhossein Hemati (IRN)	2

Quarterfinals
Talal Al-Nwas (YEM)	0
Elchin Eminov (AZE)	2
Youssif Hamoda (EGY)	2
Aman Al-Jayzani (KSA)	0
Dastan Kanybek Uulu (KGZ)	2
Islam Karimov (KAZ)	1
Amirhossein Hemati (IRN)	2
Habeb Zakarea (SUD)	0

Semifinals
Elchin Eminov (AZE)	0
Youssif Hamoda (EGY)	2
Dastan Kanybek Uulu (KGZ)	0
Amirhossein Hemati (IRN)	2

Final
Youssif Hamoda (EGY)	0
Amirhossein Hemati (IRN)	2

==== 70 kg ====
Round of 16
Erfan Moharrami (IRN)	2
Marwan Kandil (EGY)	0
Mousa Masoud (LBA)	0
Rashed Al-Rashidi (KSA)	2
Mohammed Amer (YEM)	0
Mohammad Jafar Sultani (AFG)	2
Ahmed Askar (PLE)	0
Rafkhat Zeripov (KAZ)	2
Hamza Rasulzade (AZE)	2
Md Islam (BAN)	0

Quarterfinals
Sadam Hussain (PAK)	0
Erfan Moharrami (IRN)	2
Rashed Al-Rashidi (KSA)	0
Mohammad Jafar Sultani (AFG)	2
Charles Ziengui (GAB)	0
Rafkhat Zeripov (KAZ)	2
Hamza Rasulzade (AZE)	1
Abror Khakimov (KGZ)	1

Semifinals
Erfan Moharrami (IRN)	2
Mohammad Jafar Sultani (AFG)	0
Rafkhat Zeripov (KAZ)	0
Abror Khakimov (KGZ)	2

Final
Erfan Moharrami (IRN)	2
Abror Khakimov (KGZ)	0

==== 85 kg ====
Round of 16
Farbod Taleshi (IRN)	1
Ibragim Aitakhunov (KAZ)	0
Sukanta Roy (BAN)	0
Mondher Majjadi (TUN)	1
Temirlan Amankulov (KGZ)	2
Asadullah Ehsan (AFG)	0
Alhussein Wahdan (EGY)	2
Hakan Koç (TUR)	0

Quarterfinals
Elvin Abbasov (AZE)	0
Farbod Taleshi (IRN)	2
Mondher Majjadi (TUN)	2
Merouane Adimi (ALG)	1
Omar Yahya (JOR)	0
Temirlan Amankulov (KGZ)	2
Alhussein Wahdan (EGY)	2
Abdul Rehman Ali (PAK)	0

Semifinals
Farbod Taleshi (IRN)	2
Mondher Majjadi (TUN)	0
Temirlan Amankulov (KGZ)	0
Alhussein Wahdan (EGY)	1

Final
Farbod Taleshi (IRN)	1
Alhussein Wahdan (EGY)	1

=== Women's sanda ===
==== 56 kg ====
Round of 16
Ayan Tursyn (KAZ)	2
Sarah Abduljawad (KSA)	0
Fahima Abed (PLE)	0
Shahd Abdelsadek (EGY)	2

Quarterfinals
Berna Tut (TUR)	2
Ayan Tursyn (KAZ)	0
Baktygul Kurmanbekova (KGZ)	0
Sara Ganje (IRN)	2
Shika Khatun (BAN)	2
Khalida Mirzayeva (AZE)	1
Shahd Abdelsadek (EGY)	2
Rabia Batool (PAK)	0

Semifinals
Berna Tut (TUR)	0
Sara Ganje (IRN)	2
Shika Khatun (BAN)	0
Shahd Abdelsadek (EGY)	2

Final
Sara Ganje (IRN)	1
Shahd Abdelsadek (EGY)	0

==== 60 kg ====
Quarterfinals		Semifinals		Final
		Soheila Mansourian (IRN)	1
Eya Dridi (TUN)	1	Eya Dridi (TUN)	0
Yultuz Yuldashova (KAZ)	0			Soheila Mansourian (IRN)	2
Nimra Mubashar (PAK)	0			Habiba Abouomar (EGY)	0
Sake Akter (BAN)	2	Sake Akter (BAN)	0
		Habiba Abouomar (EGY)	2

Bronze Medal Match
1	Eya Dridi (TUN)	2
2	Sake Akter (BAN)	0

==== 70 kg ====
Round of 16
Iqra (PAK)	0
Sudenaz Gülay (TUR)	0

Quarterfinals
Mirfatima Azarpur (AZE)	0
Sudenaz Gülay (TUR)	1
Kachi Mondal (BAN)	1
Tonhon Haba (CIV)	2
Chaima Naoui (TUN)	0
Mennatallah Aly (EGY)	2
Lydia Salameh (LIB)	0
Shahrbanoo Mansourian (IRN)	2

Semifinals
Sudenaz Gülay (TUR)	2
Tonhon Haba (CIV)	0
Mennatallah Aly (EGY)	2
Shahrbanoo Mansourian (IRN)	0

Final
Sudenaz Gülay (TUR)	0
Mennatallah Aly (EGY)	2
