= Syria at the 2025 Islamic Solidarity Games =

- IOC code: SYR
- NOC: Syrian Olympic Committee

in Riyadh, Saudi Arabia
- Competitors: 15 in 8 sports
- Medals Ranked 33rd: Gold 0 Silver 1 Bronze 1 Total 2

Islamic Solidarity Games appearances
- 2005; 2013; 2017; 2021; 2025

Syria competed at the 2025 Islamic Solidarity Games, which were held from 7 to 21 November 2025 in Riyadh, Saudi Arabia.

== Medalists ==
Medals by sport
Sport	1st place, gold medalist(s)	2nd place, silver medalist(s)	3rd place, bronze medalist(s)	Total
Table tennis	0	1	0	1
Swimming	0	0	1	1
Total	0	1	1	2

Medal	Name	Sport	Event	Date
Silver	Hend Zaza	Table tennis	Women's singles	13 November
Bronze	Inana Soleman	Swimming	Women's 400 m individual medley	8 November

== Competitors ==
Sport	Men	Women	Total
Duathlon	1	0	1
Equestrian	2	0	2
Karate	2	2	4
Muaythai	0	1	1
Para powerlifting	1	0	1
Swimming	1	1	2
Table tennis	0	1	1
Weightlifting	3	0	3
Total	10	5	15

== Duathlon ==
Athlete	Event	Run 1 (5 km)	Trans 1	Bike (20 km)	Trans 2	Run 2 (2.5 km)	Total Time	Rank
Ehab Khallouf Darkalt	Men's	0:16:00.8	0:00:28.4	0:35:52.3	0:00:33.9	0:08:31.7	1:01:27.4	12

== Equestrian ==
Athlete	Horse	Event	Qualification 1		Qualification 2		Final		
Athlete	Horse	Event	Penalties	Rank	Penalties	Rank	Penalties	Time	Rank
Ahmad Hamcho	Kannabis van der Bucxtale	Individual jumping	4	20 Q	4	12 Q	8	56.16	7
Amre Hamcho	Much Loved	Individual jumping	0	3 Q	0	4 Q	4	32.49	5

== Karate ==
Athlete	Event	Round of 16	Quarterfinals	Semifinals	Repechage	Final / BM	
Athlete	Event	Opposition Score	Opposition Score	Opposition Score	Opposition Score	Opposition Score	Rank
Fawaz Bani Almarjeh	Men's 67 kg	Yoan Junior (CMR); W 3–0	Alassiri (KSA); L 0–4	Did not advance	Rashidov (UZB); L 3–11	Did not advance	
Aws Alobaid	Men's 75 kg	Abudabous (LBA); L 0–6	Did not advance				
Ledy Asfoura	Women's 50 kg	Ba (SEN); L 2–6	Did not advance				
Mays Karah Fallah	Women's 55 kg	Alotaibi (KSA); L 4–5	Did not advance				

== Muaythai ==
Athlete	Event	Round of 16	Quarterfinals	Semifinals	Final	
Athlete	Event	Opposition Score	Opposition Score	Opposition Score	Opposition Score	Rank
Samra Alnadaf	Women's 50–55 kg	Bye	binti Azrilrizal (MAS); L WO	Did not advance		
Samra Alnadaf	Women's 55–60 kg	Alfar (KSA); L RSCS	Did not advance			

== Para powerlifting ==
Athlete	Event	Attempt 1	Attempt 2	Attempt 3	Result	Rank
Shadi Issa	Men's 80 kg	190	~~196~~	196	196	6

== Swimming ==
Men's

Athlete	Event	Heat		Final	
Athlete	Event	Time	Rank	Time	Rank
Omar Abbass	200 m freestyle	1:55.53	3	Did not advance	
Omar Abbass	400 m freestyle	4:07.41	5	Did not advance	

Women's

Athlete	Event	Heat		Final	
Athlete	Event	Time	Rank	Time	Rank
Inana Soleman	200 m butterfly	—N/a		2:23.49	4
Inana Soleman	400 m freestyle	4:37.34	2 Q	4:28.54	4
Inana Soleman	400 m individual medley	—N/a		5:06.11	3rd place, bronze medalist(s)
Inana Soleman	800 m fast freestyle	—N/a		9:15.50	4

== Table tennis ==
Athlete	Event	Round of 32	Round of 16	Quarterfinals	Semifinals	Final	
Athlete	Event	Opposition Score	Opposition Score	Opposition Score	Opposition Score	Opposition Score	Rank
Hend Zaza	Women's singles	Sahakian (LBN); W 4–0	Soma (BAN); W 4–0	Safaei (IRI); W 4–3	Altınkaya (TUR); W 4–3	Shahsavari (IRI); L 2–4	2nd place, silver medalist(s)

== Weightlifting ==
Athlete	Event	Snatch					Clean & Jerk					Total	Rank
Athlete	Event	1	2	3	Result	Rank	1	2	3	Result	Rank	Total	Rank
Mohamad Alkateb	Men's 88 kg	138	144	148	148	5	168	174	177	177	6	325	6
Hamza Alasad Hallak	Men's 110 kg	152	157	~~161~~	157	9	187	~~191~~	—N/a	187	10	344	9
