= Futsal at the 2025 Islamic Solidarity Games =

2025 Islamic Solidarity Games

Tournament details
- Host country: Saudi Arabia
- Dates: 3 – 11 November
- Teams: 8
- Venue: Saudi Arabian Olympic Committee Complex Green Hall 1, Riyadh

Final positions
- Champions: Iran (1st title)
- Runners-up: Morocco
- Third place: Uzbekistan

Tournament statistics
- Top scorer(s): (Morocco) Bilal Bakkali (8 goals)

The futsal tournament at the 2025 Islamic Solidarity Games in Riyadh was held between 3—11 November 2025. The futsal competition took place at Saudi Arabian Olympic Committee Complex Green Hall 1 in Saudi Arabia.

== Participating nations ==
A total of 112 athletes from 8 nations competed in futsal at the 2025 Islamic Solidarity Games:

1. Afghanistan (14)
2. Azerbaijan (14)
3. Iran (14)
4. Libya (14)
5. Morocco (14)
6. Saudi Arabia (14)
7. Tajikistan (14)
8. Uzbekistan (14)

== Competition schedule ==
All times are local Saudi Arabia Time (SAST) (UTC+3).

G	Group stage	SF	Semi-finals	B	Bronze medal match	F	Gold medal match

Stage	Round	Dates
Group stage	Matchday 1	4 November
Group stage	Matchday 2	6 November
Group stage	Matchday 3	8 November
Semi-final		9 November
Bronze medal match		11 November
Gold medal match		11 November

== Medal table ==
* Host nation (Saudi Arabia)

Rank	Nation	Gold	Silver	Bronze	Total
1	Iran	1	0	0	1
2	Morocco	0	1	0	1
3	Uzbekistan	0	0	1	1
Totals (3 entries)		1	1	1	3

== Medalists ==
Event	Gold	Silver	Bronze
Men	Iran; Ali Khalilvand Somehsofla; Amirhossein Gholami; Bagher Mohammadi; Behrooz Azimihematabadi; Behzad Rasoulioumouei; Hossein Sabzi; Hossein Tayebi Bidgoli; Mahdi Karimi; Masoud Yousef Shavardazi; Mohammad Hossein Derakhshani; Mohammadhossein Bazyar; Moslem Oladghobad; Saeid Ahmad Abbasi; Salar Aghapour	Morocco; Abdelkabir Boukdir; Anás El Ayyane; Bilal Bakkali; Bilal Hamidouch; Idriss Raiss El Fenni; Ismail Amazal; Mohamed Kamal; Mustapha Rabou; Othmane El Idrissi; Soufian Charraoui; Soufiane Borite; Soufiane El Mesrar; Yanis Erraddaf; Youssef Ben Sellam	Uzbekistan; Abbos Elmurodov; Abror Akhmetzyanov; Akbar Usmonov; Elbek Tulkinov; Eldor Nigmatov; Ikhtiyor Ropiev; Ilkhomjon Khamroev; Khayrullo Saolikhov; Mashrab Adilov; Muhammadali Khusanboev; Muzaffar Akhadjonov; Shakhzodjon Sadiev; Shakram Fakhriddinov; Shavkat Ibragimov

== Results ==
=== Preliminary ===
==== Group A ====
Pos	Team	Pld	W	D	L	GF	GA	GD	Pts
1	Uzbekistan	3	2	1	0	20	6	+14	7
2	Saudi Arabia	3	2	0	1	12	6	+6	6
3	Azerbaijan	3	1	0	2	7	22	−15	3
4	Libya	3	0	1	2	7	12	−5	1

Source: isg2025
4 November
16:00

Libya	4–5	Azerbaijan
Abdulhalim Al-Serksia 2', 27'; Mohamed Ghaeb 11'; Ahmed Al-Yumni 39'	Report	Fərid Abbasov 1', 21', 33'; Mirzə Əmirov 36', 36'

Olympic Committee Complex Green Hall 1, Riyadh
4 November
19:00

Saudi Arabia	2–5	Uzbekistan
Abdullah Al-Maghrabi 19'; Saleh Al-Qarni 38'	Report	Muzaffar Akhadjonov 20'; Muhammadali Khusanboev 29'; Akbar Usmonov 33'; Mashrab Adilov 36'; Abbos Elmurodov 40'

Olympic Committee Complex Green Hall 1, Riyadh
Referee: Ali Alayat

6 November
16:00

Uzbekistan	13–2	Azerbaijan
Ilkhomjon Khamroev 3', 28'; Muzaffar Akhadjonov 10', 23', 35'; Muhammadali Khusanboev 15', 18', 40'; Akbar Usmonov 25', 32'; Abror Akhmetzyanov 27'; Khayrullo Solikhov 30'; Eldor Nigmatov 33'	Report	Emil Həsənzadə 11'; Fərid Abbasov 26'

Olympic Committee Complex Green Hall 1, Riyadh
Referee: Ali Hafizi
6 November
19:00

Saudi Arabia	5–1	Libya
Fahad Rudayni 3'; Eihab Mohamed 11'; Abdullah Al-Aqeeli 13', 35'; Abdullah Al-Maghrabi 37'	Report	Ahmed Al-Yumni 15'

Olympic Committee Complex Green Hall 1, Riyadh
Referee: Tarek Elkhatby

8 November
16:00

Uzbekistan	2–2	Libya
Mashrab Adilov 32'; Muhammadali Khusanboev 33'	Report	Mohamed Said 20'; Ahmed Al-Yumni 28'

Olympic Committee Complex Green Hall 1, Riyadh
Referee: Reem Albishi
8 November
19:00

Saudi Arabia	5–0	Azerbaijan
Abdullah Al-Maghrabi 6'; Eihab Mohamed 9'; Abdullah Al-Aqeeli 10'; Fahad Al-Johani 13'; Fahad Rudayni 40'	Report

Olympic Committee Complex Green Hall 1, Riyadh
Referee: Husain Albahar

==== Group B ====
Pos	Team	Pld	W	D	L	GF	GA	GD	Pts
1	Morocco	3	2	1	0	13	3	+10	7
2	Iran	3	1	2	0	8	5	+3	5
3	Afghanistan	3	1	1	1	11	11	0	4
4	Tajikistan	3	0	0	3	7	20	−13	0

Source: isg2025
4 November
11:00

Afghanistan	9–5	Tajikistan
Mahdi Norowzi 1'; Sayed Mortaza Hussaini 3', 26', 33'; Sayed Mojtaba Hossaini 7'; Abbas Heydari 9', 13'; Akbar Kazemi 12', 32'	Report	Dilshod Salomov 11'; Samandar Rizomov 20', 24', 25'; Khusrav Kholiqnazarov 35'

Olympic Committee Complex Green Hall 1, Riyadh
4 November
13:30

Iran	2–2	Morocco
Mahdi Karimi 13', 24'	Report	Bilal Bakkali 15'; Soufian Charraoui 39'

Olympic Committee Complex Green Hall 1, Riyadh

6 November
11:00

Morocco	7–1	Tajikistan
Soufiane El Mesrar 1'; Bilal Bakkali 2', 37', 38'; Abdelkbir Boukdir 16'; Soufian Charraoui 29'; Idriss Raiss El Fenni 40'	Report	Bakhtiyor Soliev 7'

Olympic Committee Complex Green Hall 1, Riyadh
6 November
13:30

Iran	2–2	Afghanistan
Masoud Yousef 2', 19'	Report	Sayed Mojtaba Hossaini 15'; Mahdi Norowzi 33'

Olympic Committee Complex Green Hall 1, Riyadh
Referee: Husain Albahar

8 November
11:00

Morocco	4–0	Afghanistan
Soufiane El Mesrar 2'; Bilal Bakkali 7', 29', 39'	Report

Olympic Committee Complex Green Hall 1, Riyadh
Referee: Tarek Elkhatby
8 November
13:30

Iran	4–1	Tajikistan
Mohammad Hossein Derakhshani 1'; Hossein Tayyebi 3'; Mahdi Karimi 7'; Hossein Sabzi 12'	Report	Idris Yorov 19'

Olympic Committee Complex Green Hall 1, Riyadh
Referee: Anatoliy Rubakov

=== Knockout stage ===
Semi-finals
9 November – Riyadh
Morocco (a.e.t.)	6
Saudi Arabia	3
9 November – Riyadh
Uzbekistan	2
Iran	4

Gold medal
11 November – Riyadh
Morocco	0
Iran	5
Bronze medal
11 November – Riyadh
Saudi Arabia	1 (5)
Uzbekistan (p)	1 (6)

==== Semi-finals ====
9 November
16:00

Uzbekistan	2–4	Iran
Shakhzodjon Sadiev 3'; Akbar Usmonov 31'	Report	Masoud Yousef 5'; Salar Aghapour 29'; Moslem Oladghobad 32'; Ali Khalilvand Somehsofla 33'

Olympic Committee Complex Green Hall 1, Riyadh
Referee: Hussain Al-Bahhar (Bahrain)

9 November
19:00

Morocco	6–3 (a.e.t.)	Saudi Arabia
Yanis Ahmed Erraddaf 25'; Ismail Amazal 34'; Soufiane Borite 36'; Soufian Charraoui 47'; Idriss Raiss El Fenni 49'; Bilal Bakkali 50'	Report	Eihab Mohamed 30'; Saleh Al-Qarni 37'; Nawaf Aroan 39'

Olympic Committee Complex Green Hall 1, Riyadh
Referee: Hawkar Ahmed (Iraq)

==== Bronze medal match ====
11 November
16:00

Uzbekistan	1–1 (a.e.t.)	Saudi Arabia
Elbek Tulkinov 33'	Report	Nawaf Aroan 32'
Penalties
Mashrab Adilov (penalty scored); Ikhtiyor Ropiev (penalty scored); Elbek Tulkinov (penalty scored); Abror Akhmetzyanov (penalty missed); Muzaffar Akhadjonov (penalty scored); Abbos Elmurodov (penalty scored); Akbar Usmonov (penalty scored)	6–5	(penalty scored) Nawaf Aroan; (penalty scored) Eihab Mohamed; (penalty missed) Fahad Rudayni; (penalty scored) Moath Al-Asiri; (penalty scored) Abdulleh Al-Dossary; (penalty scored) Abdullah Al-Aqeeli; (penalty missed) Nasser Al-Harthi

Olympic Committee Complex Green Hall 1, Riyadh
Referee: Eisa Abdulhoussain (Kuwait)

==== Gold medal match ====
11 November
19:00

Morocco	0–5	Iran
	Report	Amirhossein Gholami 5', 40'; Mahdi Karimi 7'; Hossein Tayebi 11', 38'

Olympic Committee Complex Green Hall 1, Riyadh
Referee: Yahya Al-Athwani (Saudi Arabia)

== Tournament ranking ==
Per statistical convention in football, matches decided in extra time are counted as wins and losses, while matches decided by penalty shoot-out are counted as draws.

Pos	Team	Pld	W	D*	L	GF	GA	GD	Pts	Final result
1	Iran	5	3	2	0	17	7	+10	11	Gold medal
2	Morocco	5	3	1	1	19	11	+8	10	Silver medal
3	Uzbekistan	5	2	2*	1	23	11	+12	8	Bronze medal
4	Saudi Arabia	2	2	1*	2	16	13	+3	7	Fourth place
5	Afghanistan	3	1	1	1	11	11	0	4	Eliminated in Preliminary stage
6	Azerbaijan	3	1	0	2	7	22	–15	3	Eliminated in Preliminary stage
7	Libya	3	0	1	2	7	12	–5	1	Eliminated in Preliminary stage
8	Tajikistan	3	0	0	3	7	20	–13	0	Eliminated in Preliminary stage
