= Equestrian at the 2025 Islamic Solidarity Games =

- Venue: Boulevard City
- Dates: 12—15 November 2025
- Competitors: 51 from 12 nations

The equestrian tournament at the 2025 Islamic Solidarity Games in Riyadh was held between 12—15 November 2025. The equestrian competition took place at Boulevard City in Saudi Arabia.

== Medal table ==
* Host nation (Saudi Arabia)

Rank	Nation	Gold	Silver	Bronze	Total
1	Saudi Arabia*	1	0	1	2
2	Qatar	0	1	0	1
Totals (2 entries)		1	1	1	3

== Medal overview ==
Event	Gold	Silver	Bronze
Jumping	Khaled Al-Mobty; Saudi Arabia	Ali Al-Thani; Qatar	Abdullah Al-Sharbatly; Saudi Arabia

== Participating nations ==
A total of 51 athletes from 12 nations competed in equestrian at the 2025 Islamic Solidarity Games:

1. Bahrain (4)
2. Egypt (3)
3. Iraq (3)
4. Jordan (4)
5. Saudi Arabia (4)
6. Kuwait (4)
7. Morocco (4)
8. Oman (5)
9. Qatar (8)
10. Syria (2)
11. United Arab Emirates (6)
12. Uzbekistan (4)
