= Ju-jitsu at the 2025 Islamic Solidarity Games =

- Venue: Boulevard City 1
- Dates: 20—21 November 2025
- Competitors: 103 from 22 nations

The ju-jitsu tournament at the 2025 Islamic Solidarity Games in Riyadh was held between 20—21 November 2025. The ju-jitsu competition took place at Boulevard City 1 in Saudi Arabia.

== Medal table ==
* Host nation (Saudi Arabia)

Rank	Nation	Gold	Silver	Bronze	Total
1	United Arab Emirates	4	2	2	8
2	Kazakhstan	3	3	1	7
3	Saudi Arabia*	2	2	2	6
4	Palestine	0	2	0	2
5	Iran	0	0	3	3
5	Kyrgyzstan	0	0	3	3
7	Algeria	0	0	1	1
7	Iraq	0	0	1	1
7	Uzbekistan	0	0	1	1
Totals (9 entries)		9	9	14	32

== Medal overview ==
=== Men ===
Event	Gold	Silver	Bronze
62 kg	Khaled Alshehhi; United Arab Emirates	Abdulmalik Murdhi; Saudi Arabia	Mansur Khabibulla; Kazakhstan
62 kg	Khaled Alshehhi; United Arab Emirates	Abdulmalik Murdhi; Saudi Arabia	Sarvarbek Rakhmonberdiev; Uzbekistan
69 kg	Aldiyar Serik; Kazakhstan	Mohammed Huraymil; Saudi Arabia	Argen Abdymanapov; Kyrgyzstan
69 kg	Aldiyar Serik; Kazakhstan	Mohammed Huraymil; Saudi Arabia	Sultan Hassan; United Arab Emirates
77 kg	Zhiger Almatay; Kazakhstan	Mahdi Alawlaqi; United Arab Emirates	Amro Al-Sammarraie; Iraq
77 kg	Zhiger Almatay; Kazakhstan	Mahdi Alawlaqi; United Arab Emirates	Usaamah Saleh; Saudi Arabia
85 kg	Abdullah Nada; Saudi Arabia	Saeed Al-Kubaisi; United Arab Emirates	Ali Akbarpour; Iran
85 kg	Abdullah Nada; Saudi Arabia	Saeed Al-Kubaisi; United Arab Emirates	Abdurahman Murtazaliev; Kyrgyzstan
94 kg	Omar Nada; Saudi Arabia	Ramazan Kussainov; Kazakhstan	Ruslan Sagdeev; Kyrgyzstan
94 kg	Omar Nada; Saudi Arabia	Ramazan Kussainov; Kazakhstan	Abdullha Al-Kubaisi; United Arab Emirates

=== Women ===
Event	Gold	Silver	Bronze
52 kg	Asma Alhosani; United Arab Emirates	Zhibek Kulumbetova; Kazakhstan	Yasamin Nazary; Iran
57 kg	Shamsa Alameri; United Arab Emirates	Lina Eraikat; Palestine	Lama Almadani; Saudi Arabia
63 kg	Shamma Alkalbani; United Arab Emirates	Azhar Salykova; Kazakhstan	Omrani Fadia; Algeria
70 kg	Marian Zhuravleva; Kazakhstan	Dania Obaid; Palestine	Hasti Hamoodi; Iran

== Participating nations ==
A total of 103 athletes from 22 nations competed in taekwondo at the 2025 Islamic Solidarity Games:

1. Afghanistan (7)
2. Algeria (7)
3. Azerbaijan (6)
4. Bahrain (4)
5. Cameroon (1)
6. Gabon (2)
7. Iran (5)
8. Iraq (2)
9. Jordan (3)
10. Kazakhstan (9)
11. Kyrgyzstan (5)
12. Kuwait (4)
13. Morocco (6)
14. Pakistan (3)
15. Palestine (4)
16. Saudi Arabia (6)
17. Tajikistan (5)
18. Tunisia (4)
19. Turkey (2)
20. United Arab Emirates (8)
21. Uzbekistan (2)
