= Uzbekistan at the Islamic Solidarity Games =

- IOC code: UZB
- NOC: NOCRU
- Medals Ranked 4th: Gold 66 Silver 58 Bronze 96 Total 220

Islamic Solidarity Games appearances (overview)
- 2005; 2013; 2017; 2021; 2025

Uzbekistan has participated in the Islamic Solidarity Games Since the Third Edition in 2017 held in Baku, Since then the Uzbeks manage to win a total of 220 medals of whoom 66 gold, 58 silver, and 96 bronze which make them ranked Fourth in alltime medal table.

== Medal tables ==
=== Medals by Islamic Solidarity Games ===
Host nation

Below the table representing all Uzbeks medals in the games. Until now, Uzbekistan has won 220 medals (66 gold, 58 silver, and 96 bronze).

Games	Athletes	Gold	Silver	Bronze	Total	Rank	Notes	RF
(Saudi Arabia) 2005 Mecca	Did Not Compete							
(Iran) 2010 Tehran	Canceled							
(Indonesia) 2013 Palembang	Did Not Compete							
(Azerbaijan) 2017 Baku		15	17	31	63	4th	details	
(Turkey) 2021 Konya		51	42	65	158	2nd	details	
(Saudi Arabia) 2025 Riyadh							details	
(Malaysia) 2029 Selangor	Future event							
Total		66	58	96	220	4th	―	―

== See also ==
- Uzbekistan at the Olympics
- Uzbekistan at the Paralympics
- Uzbekistan at the Youth Olympics
- Uzbekistan at the Asian Games
- Sports in Uzbekistan
