= Pakistan at the Islamic Solidarity Games =

- IOC code: PAK
- NOC: Pakistan Olympic Association
- Medals Ranked 26th: Gold 5 Silver 4 Bronze 14 Total 23

Islamic Solidarity Games appearances (overview)
- 2005; 2013; 2017; 2021; 2025

Pakistan has competed at every edition of the Islamic Solidarity Games since the inaugural Games. Over the course of its participation, Pakistani athletes have won a total of 23 medals, consisting of 5 gold, 4 silver, and 14 bronze medals. This places Pakistan 26th in the all-time medal table of the Islamic Solidarity Games.

Pakistan's most successful edition in terms of total medals came at the 2017 Islamic Solidarity Games, where its athletes won 12 medals across various events. The country's highest gold-medal tally at a single edition was achieved at the 2005 Islamic Solidarity Games, where Pakistan won 3 gold medals.

== Medal tables ==
=== Medals by Islamic Solidarity Games ===
Host nation

Below is the table representing all Pakistani medals in the games. Till now, Pakistan has won 23 medals (5 gold, 4 silver, and 14 bronze).

Games	Gold	Silver	Bronze	Total	Rank	Notes	RF
(Saudi Arabia) 2005 Mecca	3	0	1	4	11	details	
(Iran) 2010 Tehran	Canceled						
(Indonesia) 2013 Palembang	0	0	0	0	—	details	
(Azerbaijan) 2017 Baku	0	3	9	12	27	details	
(Turkey) 2021 Konya	1	0	1	2	28	details	
(Saudi Arabia) 2025 Riyadh	1	1	3	5	24	details	
(Malaysia) 2029 Selangor	Future event						
Total	5	4	14	23	26	details	-

== See also ==
- Pakistan at the Olympics
- Pakistan at the Paralympics
- Pakistan at the Commonwealth Games
- Pakistan at the Asian Games
- Sports in Pakistan
