= 2025 European Table Tennis Championships – Women's team =

Women's singles at the 2025 European Table Tennis Championships
- Venue: Dvorana Krešimira Ćosića
- Location: Zadar, Croatia
- Dates: 12–19 October

The women's team event at the 2025 European Table Tennis Championships will take place in Zadar, Croatia from 12 to 19 October 2025.

== Playing system ==
=== Format ===
All matches in the team events will be played as a best-of-five series of individual matches, with the following order of play:

Match 1	Match 2	Match 3	Match 4	Match 5
A1 vs B2	A2 vs B1	A3 vs B3	A1 vs B1	A2 vs B2

=== Group stage ===
The 24 qualified teams will compete for the title of European Team Champion.

The group stage will consist of 8 groups (A–H) with 3 teams in each group. The seeding list is based on the European Team Ranking. The top 8 seeds are placed directly as position 1 in groups A to H. Teams seeded 9–12 are drawn into position 2 of Group E to H, whereas seeded 13-16 are drawn in position 2 of Group A to D. Teams seeded 17–24 are drawn freely into position 3.

Each group will be played in a round-robin format. A team who first takes three individual matches gets two points, and the other team lost will get one point. Group winners and runner ups will advance to the knockout stage.

=== Knockout stage ===
The knockout stage begins with the round of 16. Group winners and runner up in the same group will be drawn into opposite half.

== Seeding ==
The seeding list was determined by the ETTU Ranking Committee.

Seed	Team	Player 1	Player 2	Player 3	Player 4	Player 5
1	Romania	Bernadette Szőcs	Elizabeta Samara	Andreea Dragoman	Adina Diaconu	Elena Zaharia
2	Germany	Sabine Winter	Mia Griesel	Nina Mittelham	Wan Yuan	Annett Kaufmann
3	France	Yuan Jia Nan	Prithika Pavade	Charlotte Lutz	Léana Hochart	Camille Lutz
4	Portugal	Shao Jieni	Yu Fu	Matilde Pinto	Júlia Leal	
5	Sweden	Linda Bergström	Christina Källberg	Filippa Bergand	Nomin Baasan	
6	Poland	Natalia Bajor	Katarzyna Węgrzyn	Zuzanna Wielgos	Anna Brzyska	
7	Croatia	Lea Rakovac	Ivana Malobabić	Hana Arapović	Mateja Jeger Majstorović	Andrea Pavlović
8	Ukraine	Margaryta Pesotska	Veronika Matiunina	Anastasiya Dymitrenko	Tetyana Bilenko	
9	Italy	Giorgia Piccolin	Gaia Monfardini	Debora Vivarelli	Nicole Arlia	Miriam Carnovale
10	Slovakia	Tatiana Kukuľková	Barbora Várady	Ema Labošová	Dominika Wiltschková	
11	Austria	Sofia Polcanova	Karoline Mischek	Nina Skerbinz	Liu Yuan	
12	Hungary	Georgina Póta	Judit Nagy	Rebeka Nagy	Johanna Pétery	
13	Luxembourg	Sarah De Nutte	Enisa Sadikovic	Tessy Dumont	Melisa Sadikovic	
14	Czech Republic	Hana Matelová	Veronika Poláková	Zdena Blašková	Hanka Kodet	
15	Spain	Maria Xiao	Sofia-Xuan Zhang	María Berzosa	Elvira Fiona Rad	Ainhoa Cristóbal
16	Serbia	Izabela Lupulesku	Sabina Šurjan	Aneta Maksuti	Reka Bezeg	
17	Turkey	Sibel Altınkaya	Özge Yılmaz	Ece Haraç	Simay Kulakçeken	
18	Netherlands	Britt Eerland	Men Shuohan	Li Jie	Tanja Helle	
19	Wales	Anna Hursey	Charlotte Carey	Danielle Kelly	Lara Whitton	
20	Greece	Aikaterini Toliou	Malamatenia Papadimitriou	Elisavet Terpou	Ioanna Gerasimatou	
21	England	Tin-Tin Ho	Tianer Yu	Jasmin Wong	Ella Pashley	
22	Belgium	Lilou Massart	Margo Degraef	Julie Van Hauwaert	Eloïse Duvivier	
23	Slovenia	Ana Tofant	Sara Tokić	Lara Opeka	Katarina Stražar	
24	Bulgaria	Tsvetelina Georgieva	Kalina Hristova	Maria Yovkova	Viktoria Persova	

== Draw ==
=== Group stage ===
==== Group A ====
Pos	Team	Pld	W	L	Pts
1	Romania (1)	2	2	0	4
2	Luxembourg (13)	2	1	1	3
3	Wales (19)	2	0	2	2

==== Group B ====
Pos	Team	Pld	W	L	Pts
1	Germany (2)	2	2	0	4
2	Serbia (16)	2	1	1	3
3	Slovenia (23)	2	0	2	2

==== Group C ====
Pos	Team	Pld	W	L	Pts
1	Netherlands (18)	2	2	0	4
2	Spain (15)	2	1	1	3
3	France (3)	2	0	2	2

==== Group D ====
Pos	Team	Pld	W	L	Pts
1	Portugal (4)	2	2	0	4
2	Czech Republic (14)	2	1	1	3
3	Belgium (22)	2	0	2	2

==== Group E ====
Pos	Team	Pld	W	L	Pts
1	Sweden (5)	2	2	0	4
2	Austria (11)	2	1	1	3
3	Greece (20)	2	0	2	2

==== Group F ====
Pos	Team	Pld	W	L	Pts
1	Poland (6)	2	2	0	4
2	Hungary (12)	2	1	1	3
3	Bulgaria (24)	2	0	2	2

==== Group G ====
Pos	Team	Pld	W	L	Pts
1	Croatia (7)	2	2	0	4
2	England (21)	2	1	1	3
3	Italy (9)	2	0	2	2

==== Group H ====
Pos	Team	Pld	W	L	Pts
1	Ukraine (8)	2	2	0	4
2	Slovakia (10)	2	1	1	3
3	Turkey (17)	2	0	2	2

==== Knockout stage ====
R16
1	Romania	3
16	Serbia	2
10	Slovakia	3
7	Croatia	1
6	Poland	3
11	Austria	2
14	Czech Republic	1
18	Netherlands	3
4	Portugal	3
13	Luxembourg	0
12	Hungary	0
8	Ukraine	3
5	Sweden	3
15	Spain	0
21	England	0
2	Germany	3

Quarterfinals
1	Romania	3
10	Slovakia	0
6	Poland	1
18	Netherlands	3
4	Portugal	3
8	Ukraine	2
5	Sweden	0
2	Germany	3

Semifinals
1	Romania	3
18	Netherlands	0
4	Portugal	0
2	Germany	3

Final
1	Romania	0
2	Germany	3

== Qualification ==
Top 16 finishers will be directly qualified in 2026 World Team Table Tennis Championships. The remaining teams participating in this tournament may qualify based on ITTF Team Ranking published on November, 2025.

=== Final Ranking ===
Position	Team	Qualification
1	Germany	Qualified for 2026 WTTTC
2	Romania	Qualified for 2026 WTTTC
3-4	Portugal	Qualified for 2026 WTTTC
3-4	Netherlands	Qualified for 2026 WTTTC
5-8	Slovakia	Qualified for 2026 WTTTC
5-8	Poland	Qualified for 2026 WTTTC
5-8	Ukraine	Qualified for 2026 WTTTC
5-8	Sweden	Qualified for 2026 WTTTC
9-16	Serbia	Qualified for 2026 WTTTC
9-16	Croatia	Qualified for 2026 WTTTC
9-16	Austria	Qualified for 2026 WTTTC
9-16	Czech Republic	Qualified for 2026 WTTTC
9-16	Luxembourg	Qualified for 2026 WTTTC
9-16	Hungary	Qualified for 2026 WTTTC
9-16	Spain	Qualified for 2026 WTTTC
9-16	England (H)	Host Nation and Top 16 Finisher (An extra continental quota will be allocated to Playoff Winner.)
17-24	France	Qualify through Continental Quota (Playoff Winner)
17-24	Italy	Qualify through ITTF Teams Ranking
17-24	Turkey	Qualify through ITTF Teams Ranking
17-24	Wales	Qualify through ITTF Teams Ranking
17-24	Greece	Not possible to qualify unless qualified teams not confirmed to participate
17-24	Bulgaria	Not possible to qualify unless qualified teams not confirmed to participate
17-24	Slovenia	Not possible to qualify unless qualified teams not confirmed to participate
17-24	Belgium	Not possible to qualify unless qualified teams not confirmed to participate
