= Iran at the Islamic Solidarity Games =

- IOC code: IRN
- NOC: NOCIRI
- Medals Ranked 2nd: Gold 147 Silver 115 Bronze 139 Total 401

Islamic Solidarity Games appearances (overview)
- 2005; 2013; 2017; 2021; 2025

Iran has participated at every celebration of the Islamic Solidarity Games since the first edition in 2005 in Mecca. Iran was ready to host the second Islamic Solidarity Games in Tehran but was canceled due to political tensions between Iran and Saudi Arabia.

Iranian athletes have won a total of 401 medals (147 gold, 115 silver, and 139 bronze), which makes them second in all-time medal table just after Turkey.

== Medal tables ==
=== Medals by Islamic Solidarity Games ===
Host nation

Below the table representing all Iranian medals around the games. Till now, Iran win 401 medals (147 gold, 115 silver, and 139 bronze).

Games	Athletes	Gold	Silver	Bronze	Total	Rank	Notes	RF
(Saudi Arabia) 2005 Mecca	130	10	9	11	30	4	details	
(Iran) 2010 Tehran	Canceled							
(Indonesia) 2013 Palembang	87	30	17	12	59	2	details	
(Azerbaijan) 2017 Baku	282	39	26	33	98	3	details	
(Turkey) 2021 Konya	253	39	44	50	133	3	details	
(Saudi Arabia) 2025 Riyadh	191	29	19	33	81	3	details	
Total		147	115	139	401	2	—	—

=== Notes ===
- In 2017, an Iranian taekwondo athlete tested positive for doping, and the number of medals had to be reduced to 97.
- In 2021, the game site's sources mistakenly recorded one more cycling medal for Iran. In the Para-table tennis competition, two bronze medals were recorded for Iran. Given the small number of participants and unclear information, it seems that two Iranian representatives came fourth and a joint bronze medal was not distributed. However, there is no accurate information. Most likely, the number of 130 medals for Iran is more correct.

== See also ==
- Iran at the Olympics
- Iran at the Paralympics
- Iran at the Asian Games
- Iran at the Asian Para Games
- Iran at the World Games
- Iran at the Universiade
- Sports in Iran
