= Karate at the 2025 Islamic Solidarity Games =

- Venue: Boulevard City 1
- Dates: 11—12 November 2025
- Competitors: 155 from 41 nations

The karate tournament at the 2025 Islamic Solidarity Games in Riyadh was held between 11—12 November 2025. The karate competition took place at Boulevard City 1 in Saudi Arabia.

== Medal table ==
* Host nation (Saudi Arabia)

Rank	Nation	Gold	Silver	Bronze	Total
1	Iran	3	2	0	5
2	Turkey	2	3	1	6
3	Saudi Arabia*	2	0	4	6
4	Kuwait	1	2	1	4
5	Tunisia	1	1	0	2
5	Uzbekistan	1	1	0	2
7	Azerbaijan	1	0	2	3
7	Kazakhstan	1	0	2	3
9	Jordan	0	2	2	4
10	Morocco	0	1	0	1
11	Algeria	0	0	5	5
12	United Arab Emirates	0	0	2	2
13	Cameroon	0	0	1	1
13	Ivory Coast	0	0	1	1
13	Libya	0	0	1	1
Totals (15 entries)		12	12	22	46

== Medal overview ==
=== Men ===
Event	Gold	Silver	Bronze
Kata	Enes Özdemir; Turkey	Mohammad Al-Mosawi; Kuwait	Roman Heydarov; Azerbaijan
Kata	Enes Özdemir; Turkey	Mohammad Al-Mosawi; Kuwait	Youcef Ziad; Algeria
60 kg	Eray Şamdan; Turkey	Abdullah Shaaban; Kuwait	Zholaman Bigabyl; Kazakhstan
60 kg	Eray Şamdan; Turkey	Abdullah Shaaban; Kuwait	Saud Al-Basher; Saudi Arabia
67 kg	Mohammed Al-Assiri; Saudi Arabia	Abdelrahman Al-Masatfa; Jordan	Ayoub Anis Helassa; Algeria
67 kg	Mohammed Al-Assiri; Saudi Arabia	Abdelrahman Al-Masatfa; Jordan	Omar Chaltouni; United Arab Emirates
75 kg	Omar Al-Jenaei; Kuwait	Morteza Nemati; Iran	Enes Bulut; Turkey
75 kg	Omar Al-Jenaei; Kuwait	Morteza Nemati; Iran	Sultan Al-Zahrani; Saudi Arabia
84 kg	Nikita Tarnakin; Kazakhstan	Mohammad Al-Jafari; Jordan	Rida Messaoudi; United Arab Emirates
84 kg	Nikita Tarnakin; Kazakhstan	Mohammad Al-Jafari; Jordan	Falleh Midoune; Algeria
+84 kg	Sanad Sufyani; Saudi Arabia	Saleh Abazari; Iran	Nuri Abdulsalam; Libya

=== Women ===
Event	Gold	Silver	Bronze
Kata	Fatemeh Sadeghi; Iran	Dilara Bozan; Turkey	Narimène Dahleb; Algeria
50 kg	Sara Bahmanyar; Iran	Gulshan Alimardanova; Uzbekistan	Abeni Adebayo; Ivory Coast
50 kg	Sara Bahmanyar; Iran	Gulshan Alimardanova; Uzbekistan	Abeer Al-Shehri; Saudi Arabia
55 kg	Sevinch Rakhimova; Uzbekistan	Chaimae El Hayti; Morocco	Asrar Jasem; Kuwait
55 kg	Sevinch Rakhimova; Uzbekistan	Chaimae El Hayti; Morocco	Madina Sadigova; Azerbaijan
61 kg	Atousa Golshadnejad; Iran	Wafa Mahjoub; Tunisia	Malak Al-Khulaidi; Saudi Arabia
61 kg	Atousa Golshadnejad; Iran	Wafa Mahjoub; Tunisia	Dzeu Nelly; Cameroon
68 kg	Irina Zaretska; Azerbaijan	Eda Eltemur; Turkey	Daiyana Darenskaya; Kazakhstan
68 kg	Irina Zaretska; Azerbaijan	Eda Eltemur; Turkey	Joud Al-Drous; Jordan
+68 kg	Isra Ben Taïeb; Tunisia	Zeyna Gaballa; Turkey	Yara Naser; Jordan
+68 kg	Isra Ben Taïeb; Tunisia	Zeyna Gaballa; Turkey	Chaïma Oudira; Algeria

== Participating nations ==
A total of 155 athletes from 41 nations competed in karate at the 2025 Islamic Solidarity Games:

1. Afghanistan (3)
2. Albania (2)
3. Algeria (6)
4. Azerbaijan (6)
5. Bahrain (4)
6. Bangladesh (5)
7. Benin (2)
8. Brunei (2)
9. Burkina Faso (4)
10. Cameroon (6)
11. Comoros (1)
12. Ivory Coast (5)
13. Djibouti (1)
14. Gabon (2)
15. The Gambia (1)
16. Guinea (2)
17. Iran (6)
18. Iraq (1)
19. Jordan (5)
20. Kazakhstan (4)
21. Kyrgyzstan (4)
22. Kuwait (5)
23. Libya (2)
24. Malaysia (5)
25. Mauritania (3)
26. Morocco (6)
27. Mozambique (2)
28. Niger (2)
29. Oman (1)
30. Pakistan (6)
31. Palestine (2)
32. Qatar (2)
33. Saudi Arabia (12)
34. Senegal (5)
35. Sudan (5)
36. Syria (4)
37. Tunisia (2)
38. Turkey (6)
39. United Arab Emirates (5)
40. Uzbekistan (6)
41. Yemen (3)
- Except host country, Saudi Arabia, all other countries could only have a maximum of 6 athletes (3 man + 3 woman).

== Men's results ==
=== Men's kata ===
Round of 16
Awang Haji Johar (BRU)	39.0
Adamou Issoufou Labo (NIG)	36.3
Omar Diop (SEN)	36.5
Rakan Al-Badri (KSA)	38.4

Quarterfinals
Awang Haji Johar (BRU)	38.2
Kareem Al-Haija (UAE)	39.6
Roman Heydarov (AZE)	39.8
Mohammad Al-Mosawi (KUW)	40.1
Rakan Al-Badri (KSA)	38.5
Youcef Ziad (ALG)	38.9
Yousif Mustafa (IRQ)	38.4
Enes Özdemir (TUR)	41.3

Semifinals
Kareem Al-Haija (UAE)	39.6
Mohammad Al-Mosawi (KUW)	40.8
Youcef Ziad (ALG)	39.3
Enes Özdemir (TUR)	41.4

Final
Mohammad Al-Mosawi (KUW)	41.4
Enes Özdemir (TUR)	43.2

Bronze medals
Roman Heydarov (AZE)	41.1
Kareem Al-Haija (UAE)	39.2
Youcef Ziad (ALG)	40.0
Yousif Mustafa (IRQ)	39.9

=== Men's 60 kg ===
Final

Final
Abdullah Shaaban (KUW)	1
Eray Şamdan (TUR)	3

Top half

Round of 32
Ali Meskini (IRN)	9
Danesh Nazri (MAS)	1

Round of 16
Bekzhan Kalykov (KGZ)	2
Ali Meskini (IRN)	5
Muhammad Ibrar (PAK)	0
Zholaman Bigabyl (KAZ)	5
Orges Arifi (ALB)	4
Abdallah Hammad (JOR)	4
Martial Kpadonou (BEN)	1
Abdullah Shaaban (KUW)	9

Quarterfinals
Ali Meskini (IRN)	3
Zholaman Bigabyl (KAZ)	8
Abdallah Hammad (JOR)	1
Abdullah Shaaban (KUW)	2

Semifinals
Zholaman Bigabyl (KAZ)	0
Abdullah Shaaban (KUW)	1

Bottom half

Round of 32

Round of 16
Waleed Alnaggar (YEM)	0
Idris Al-Batrani (OMA)	9
Shelton Massango (MOZ)	0
Saud Al-Basher (KSA)	9
Abdel Ali Jina (MAR)	8
Qudrat Ullah Obaidi (AFG)	0
Abdelrahman Elkhair (SUD)	0
Eray Şamdan (TUR)	6

Quarterfinals
Idris Al-Batrani (OMA)	1
Saud Al-Basher (KSA)	3
Abdel Ali Jina (MAR)	1
Eray Şamdan (TUR)	4

Semifinals
Saud Al-Basher (KSA)	1
Eray Şamdan (TUR)	2

Repechage

Repechage
Martial Kpadonou (BEN)	2
Abdallah Hammad (JOR)	3
Abdelrahman Elkhair (SUD)	0
Abdel Ali Jina (MAR)	3

Bronze medals
Abdallah Hammad (JOR)	0
Zholaman Bigabyl (KAZ)	8
Abdel Ali Jina (MAR)	2
Saud Al-Basher (KSA)	10

=== Men's 67 kg ===
Final

Final
Abdel Rahman Al-Masatfa (JOR)	1
Mohammed Al-Assiri (KSA)	3

Top half

Round of 32
Yagba Mani (CIV)	3
Vizit Baratov (KGZ)	9
Shams Ud Din (PAK)	3
Mohammed Jorjis Anower Naim (BAN)	3

Round of 16
Moulaye Diallo (MTN)	0
Ayoub Anis Helassa (ALG)	8
Vizit Baratov (KGZ)	7
Yaman Al-Natsheh (QAT)	2
Mohammed Jorjis Anower Naim (BAN)	3
David Obissa (GAB)	7
Mamady Toure (GUI)	5
Abdel Rahman Al-Masatfa (JOR)	9

Quarterfinals
Ayoub Anis Helassa (ALG)	7
Vizit Baratov (KGZ)	1
David Obissa (GAB)	0
Abdel Rahman Al-Masatfa (JOR)	8

Semifinals
Ayoub Anis Helassa (ALG)	2
Abdel Rahman Al-Masatfa (JOR)	9

Bottom half

Round of 32
Omar Chaltouni (UAE)	7
Cecil Jospin Lokossou (BEN)	0

Round of 16
Fawaz Bani Al-Marjeh (SYR)	3
Dassi Junior (CMR)	0
Abdul Vakhkhob Rashidov (UZB)	0
Mohammed Al-Assiri (KSA)	4
Omar Chaltouni (UAE)	3
Mahmoud Daifallah (PLE)	0
Zakarya Al-Ameer (YEM)	0
Said Oubaya (MAR)	8

Quarterfinals
Fawaz Bani Al-Marjeh (SYR)	0
Mohammed Al-Assiri (KSA)	4
Omar Chaltouni (UAE)	6
Said Oubaya (MAR)	6

Semifinals
Mohammed Al-Assiri (KSA)	8
Omar Chaltouni (UAE)	6

Repechage

Repechage round
Mamady Toure (GUI)	7
David Obissa (GAB)	1
Abdul Vakhkhob Rashidov (UZB)	11
Fawaz Bani Al-Marjeh (SYR)	3

Bronze medals
Mamady Toure (GUI)	0
Ayoub Anis Helassa (ALG)	4
Abdul Vakhkhob Rashidov (UZB)	2
Omar Chaltouni (UAE)	2

=== Men's 75 kg ===
Round of 16
Morteza Nemati (IRN)	7
Mubarak Ali (PAK)	0
Bi Tabolo Edgar Bauness Ta (CIV)	0
Sultan Al-Zahrani (KSA)	1
Nazim Nurlanov (KGZ)	9
Mustafa Walizada (AFG)	0
Aws Al-Obaid (SYR)	0
Mohamed Abudabous (LBA)	6
Emmanuel Mendy (GAM)	9
Mohamed Gueye (MTN)	0
Ahmed Ahmed (SUD)	1
Omar Al-Jenaei (KUW)	9
Enes Bulut (TUR)	8
Bagawathi Muniyandi (MAS)	0
Maximiano Simiao Sambo (MOZ)	0
Kuvonchbek Mukhammadiev (UZB)	8

Quarterfinals
Morteza Nemati (IRN)	6
Sultan Al-Zahrani (KSA)	5
Nazim Nurlanov (KGZ)	1
Mohamed Aboudabous (LBA)	10
Emmanuel Mendy (GAM)	0
Omar Al-Jenaei (KUW)	0
Enes Bulut (TUR)	5
Kuvonchbek Mukhammadiev (UZB)	1

Semifinals
Morteza Nemati (IRN)	7
Mohamed Aboudabous (LBA)	5
Omar Al-Jenaei (KUW)	5
Enes Bulut (TUR)	4

Final
Morteza Nemati (IRN)	4
Omar Al-Jenaei (KUW)	4

Repechage

Repechage
Mubarak Ali (PAK)	0
Sultan Al-Zahrani (KSA)	8
Ahmed Ahmed (SUD)	0
Emmanuel Mendy (GAM)	0

Bronze medals
Sultan Al-Zahrani (KSA)	11
Mohamed Abudabous (LBA)	8
Ahmed Ahmed (SUD)	0
Enes Bulut (TUR)	8

=== Men's 84 kg ===
Final

Final
Nikita Tarnakin (KAZ)	8
Mohammad Al-Jafari (JOR)	3

Top half

Round of 32
Mintu Deay (BAN)	1
Midoune Falleh (ALG)	3

Round of 16
Mehran Wahedi (AFG)	0
Midoune Falleh (ALG)	3
Nikita Tarnakin (KAZ)	8
Rick Lontsi (CMR)	0
Melos Gashi (ALB)	5
Salem Al-Juma (BHR)	0
Anas Al-Zahrani (KSA)	4
Mehdi Sriti (MAR)	0

Quarterfinals
Midoune Falleh (ALG)	3
Nikita Tarnakin (KAZ)	4
Melos Gashi (ALB)	2
Anas Al-Zahrani (KSA)	0

Semifinals
Nikita Tarnakin (KAZ)	3
Melos Gashi (ALB)	0

Bottom half

Round of 32

Round of 16
Ibrahim Fahad (COM)	0
Makhtar Diop (SEN)	8
Shukhratjon Namozov (UZB)	3
Abdalla Moustfa (SUD)	0
Rida Messaoudi (UAE)	4
Kamarul Bin Sabaruddin (MAS)	0
Turgut Hasanov (AZE)	0
Mohammad Al-Jafari (JOR)	5

Quarterfinals
Makhtar Diop (SEN)	2
Shukhratjon Namozov (UZB)	0
Rida Messaoudi (UAE)	6
Mohammad Al-Jafari (JOR)	0

Semifinals
Makhtar Diop (SEN)	0
Mohammad Al-Jafari (JOR)	7

Repechage

Repechage round
Rick Lontsi (CMR)	2
Midoune Falleh (ALG)	5
Turgut Hasanov (AZE)	5
Rida Messaoudi (UAE)	11

Bronze medals
Midoune Falleh (ALG)	6
Melos Gashi (ALB)	1
Makhtar Diop (SEN)	3
Rida Messaoudi (UAE)	3

=== Men's +84 kg ===
Quarterfinals
Alpha Ladji Souleymane Sanogo (CIV)	3
Mouhamadou Falilou Diop (SEN)	2
Nuri Abdulsalam (LBA)	11
Koung Martiny Louis Baptiste (CMR)	2

Semifinals
Alpha Ladji Souleymane Sanogo (CIV)	0
Sanad Sufyani (KSA)	8
Nuri Abdulsalam (LBA)	1
Saleh Abazari (IRN)	8

Final
Sanad Sufyani (KSA)	4
Saleh Abazari (IRN)	0

Bronze medals
Alpha Ladji Souleymane Sanogo (CIV)	7
Nuri Abdulsalam (LBA)	8

== Women's results ==
=== Women's kata ===
Quarterfinals		Semifinals		Final
Narimène Dahleb (ALG)	38.3
Farhah Shamrin (BRU)	37.7	Narimène Dahleb (ALG)	40.1
Aya En-Nesyry (MAR)	38.7	Dilara Bozan (TUR)	41.3
Dilara Bozan (TUR)	40.0			Dilara Bozan (TUR)	40.3
Dalal Al-Saied (KUW)	37.3			Fatemeh Sadeghi (IRI)	42.4
Shikha Al-Yafae (UAE)	36.5	Dalal Al-Saied (KUW)	36.0
Manal Al-Zaid (KSA)	36.2	Fatemeh Sadeghi (IRI)	39.7
Fatemeh Sadeghi (IRI)	39.4

Bronze medals
Narimène Dahleb (ALG)	40.5
Aya En-Nesyry (MAR)	40.3
Dalal Al-Saied (KUW)	37.9
Manal Al-Zaid (KSA)	36.3

=== Women's 50 kg ===
Round of 16
Fatema Falamarzi (BHR)	0
Rabia Farooq (PAK)	7
Fatima Jabrayilova (AZE)	1
Hawraa Al-Ajmi (UAE)	3
Abeer Al-Shehri (KSA)	10
Saiama Jaman (BAN)	8
Abeni Adebayo (CIV)	4
Mona Al-Kharfi (QAT)	0
Ledy Asfoura (SYR)	2
Salimata Ba (SEN)	6

Quarterfinals
Rabia Farooq (PAK)	1
Hawraa Al-Ajmi (UAE)	6
Abeer Al-Shehri (KSA)	1
Gulshan Alimardanova (UZB)	9
Abeni Adebayo (CIV)	6
Ilhan Mohamed (DJI)	0
Salimata Ba (SEN)	0
Sara Bahmanyar (IRN)	3

Semifinals
Hawraa Al-Ajmi (UAE)	0
Gulshan Alimardanova (UZB)	8
Abeni Adebayo (CIV)	0
Sara Bahmanyar (IRN)	4

Final
Gulshan Alimardanova (UZB)	4
Sara Bahmanyar (IRN)	6

Bronze medals
Abeer Al-Shehri (KSA)	11
Hawraa Al-Ajmi (UAE)	5
Salimata Ba (SEN)	1
Abeni Adebayo (CIV)	1

=== Women's 55 kg ===
Round of 16
Mays Karah Fallah (SYR)	4
Najla Al-Otaibi (KSA)	5
Rinad Mahyoub (YEM)	8
Asmaa Ishag (SUD)	0
Fatema Shanbaih (BHR)	0
Laiba Zia (PAK)	8

Quarterfinals
Djeinaba Ba (MTN)	1
Chaimae El Hayti (MAR)	6
Asrar Jasem (KUW)	1
Najla Al-Otaibi (KSA)	6
Rinad Mahyoub (YEM)	0
Madina Sadigova (AZE)	4
Laiba Zia (PAK)	0
Sevinch Rakhimova (UZB)	3

Semifinals
Chaimae El Hayti (MAR)	7
Asrar Jasem (KUW)	1
Madina Sadigova (AZE)	3
Sevinch Rakhimova (UZB)	7

Final
Chaimae El Hayti (MAR)	3
Sevinch Rakhimova (UZB)	7

Bronze medals
Djeinaba Ba (MTN)	2
Asrar Jasem (KUW)	8
Laiba Zia (PAK)	2
Madina Sadigova (AZE)	7

=== Women's 61 kg ===
Round of 16
Asrar Abdulla (BHR)	2
Jeanne Ella (GAB)	5
Jayashree Pathiyanathan (MAS)	4
Humayra Akter Antora (BAN)	4

Quarterfinals
Jeanne Ella (GAB)	0
Nelly Dzeu (CMR)	8
Ramatoulaye Sylla (SEN)	0
Wafa Mahjoub (TUN)	7
Jayashree Pathiyanathan (MAS)	0
Malak Al-Khulaidi (KSA)	1
Roumanatou Nomao (NIG)	1
Atousa Golshadnezhad (IRN)	9

Semifinals
Nelly Dzeu (CMR)	0
Wafa Mahjoub (TUN)	8
Malak Al-Khulaidi (KSA)	2
Atousa Golshadnezhad (IRN)	10

Final
Wafa Mahjoub (TUN)	4
Atousa Golshadnezhad (IRN)	7

Bronze medals
Ramatoulaye Sylla (SEN)	4
Nelly Dzeu (CMR)	6
Roumanatou Nomao (NIG)	0
Malak Al-Khulaidi (KSA)	7

=== Women's 68 kg ===
Round of 16
Hala Al-Qadi (PLE)	5
Maryam Al-Salah (KSA)	6
Daiyana Darenakaya (KAZ)	3
Nissrine Brouk (MAR)	3
Mekkaoui Karima (ALG)	7
Orlane Kouassi (CIV)	2
Anne Keita (GUI)	8
Fatma Silman (SUD)	0
Nuran Rzazade (CMR)	5
Mirza Athirah Mohd Faizal (MAS)	2

Quarterfinals
Maryam Al-Salah (KSA)	0
Eda Eltemur (TUR)	8
Joud Al-Drous (JOR)	2
Irina Zaretska (AZE)	5
Daiyana Darenskaya (KAZ)	3
Mekkaoui Karima (ALG)	0
Anne Keita (GUI)	12
Nuran Rzazade (CMR)	4

Semifinals
Eda Eltemur (TUR)	2
Daiyana Darenskaya (KAZ)	2
Irina Zaretska (AZE)	6
Anne Keita (GUI)	3

Final
Eda Eltemur (TUR)	3
Irina Zaretska (AZE)	5

Bronze medals
Maryam Al-Salah (KSA)	0
Daiyana Darenskaya (KAZ)	8
Joud Al-Drous (JOR)	6
Anne Keita (GUI)	0

=== Women's +68 kg ===
Round of 16
Chaïma Oudira (ALG)	10
Stella Ogandoa Nsioma (CMR)	1

Quarterfinals
Chaïma Oudira (ALG)	5
Fakhar Un Nisa (PAK)	0
Rabeya Sultana Mim (BAN)	1
Zeyna Gaballa (TUR)	10
Begimai Orozalieva (KGZ)	0
Isra Ben Taieb (TUN)	8
Yara Naser (JOR)	4
Sofya Berultseva (KAZ)	4

Semifinals
Chaïma Oudira (ALG)	3
Zeyna Gaballa (TUR)	5
Isra Ben Taieb (TUN)	8
Yara Naser (JOR)	0

Final
Zeyna Gaballa (TUR)	4
Isra Ben Taieb (TUN)	4

Bronze medals
Rabeya Sultana Mim (BAN)	0
Chaïma Oudira (ALG)	9
Begimai Orozalieva (KGZ)	1
Yara Naser (JOR)	9
