= Soheila Mansourian =

Iranian wushu athlete

Personal information
- Full name: Soheila Mansourian Semiromi
- Nationality: Iranian
- Born: 23 September 1988 (age 37) Semirom, Isfahan Province, Iran
- Education: Physical Education; IAU, Khorasgan Branch
- Height: 174 cm (5 ft 9 in)
- Weight: 60 kg (132 lb)

Sport
- Country: Iran
- Sport: Wushu
- Event: Sanda
Medal record
Representing Iran
Wushu
World Championships
Gold medal – first place	2025 Brasília	70 kg
Islamic Solidarity Games
Gold medal – first place	2025 Riyadh	60 kg
Sanda World Cup
Gold medal – first place	2014 Jakarta	52 kg
Silver medal – second place	2025 Jiangyin	60 kg
Sanda Asian Championship
Bronze medal – third place	2016 Taoyuan	52 kg

Soheila Mansourian (Persian: سهیلا منصوریان; born 23 September 1988 in Semirom) is an Iranian wushu athlete and gold medalist at the 2014 Sanda World Cup who competes in the sanda 52 kg division. She is sister of Elaheh and Shahrbanoo Mansourian, world-renowned wushu champions. She is a member of the Iran women's wushu national team. In 2015, she competed in the Kunlun Fight organization. In 2020, she succeeded to enter MMA competitions.

== Honours ==
=== National ===
- Sanda World Cup
  - Gold: 2014, Indonesia
- Sanda Asian Championship
  - Bronze: 2016, Taiwan

=== Personal ===
- Iranian Women's Wushu League (Stars Cup)
  - 1st place: 2013
  - 1st place: 2017
  - 1st place: 2018
- China's Sanda Premier League (SPL)
  - 2nd place: 2017

== Enghelab Sport complex controversy ==
The release of a video by Soheila Mansoorian on her Instagram soon created a tense atmosphere against the directors of the Enghelab Sport Complex. The wushu champion, who went to the Enghelab Complex for aerobic training on Thursday 9 July 2020, got into a fight with a security guard because her membership card had expired and, according to her, was expelled from the complex.

== See also ==
- Elaheh Mansourian
- Shahrbanoo Mansourian
