= Shahrbanoo Mansourian =

Iranian wushu athlete

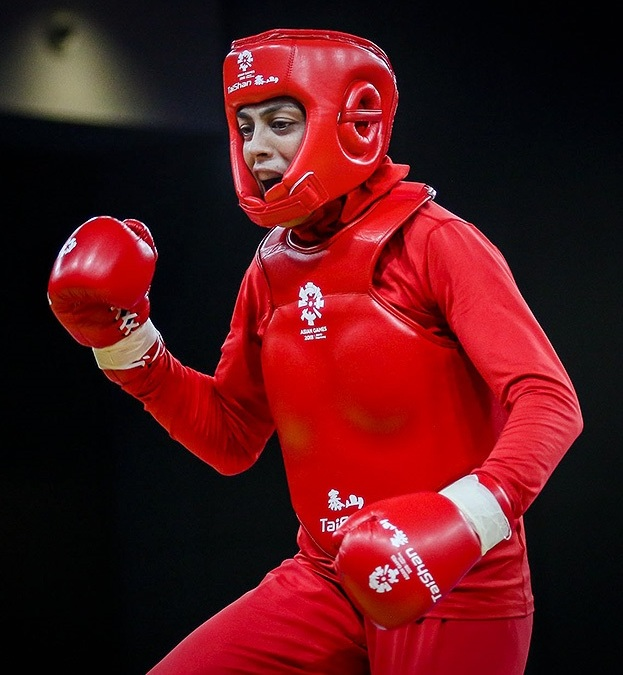
- Mansourian at 2018 Asian Games

Personal information
- Born: 28 January 1986 (age 40) Semirom, Isfahan Province, Iran
- Height: 175 cm (5 ft 9 in)
- Weight: 60 kg (132 lb)

Sport
- Country: Iran
- Sport: Wushu
- Event: Sanda
- Coached by: Layla Bandani
Medal record
Women's wushu
Representing Iran
World Championships
| Gold medal – first place | 2011 Ankara | Sanda 70 kg |
| Gold medal – first place | 2013 Kuala Lumpur | Sanda 75 kg |
| Gold medal – first place | 2015 Jakarta | Sanda 65 kg |
| Gold medal – first place | 2017 Kazan | Sanda 65 kg |
| Gold medal – first place | 2019 Shanghai | Sanda 70 kg |
| Gold medal – first place | 2025 Brasília | Sanda 75 kg |
World Cup
| Gold medal – first place | 2016 Xi'an | Sanda 70 kg |
| Gold medal – first place | 2025 Jiangyin | Sanda 75 kg |
Asian Championships
| Gold medal – first place | 2016 Taoyuan | Sanda 65 kg |
Asian Games
| Silver medal – second place | 2018 Jakarta | Sanda 60 kg |
| Bronze medal – third place | 2022 Hangzhou | Sanda 60 kg |
Islamic Solidarity Games
| Bronze medal – third place | 2025 Riyadh | Sanda 70 kg |

Shahrbanoo Mansourian (Persian: شهربانو منصوریان, born 28 January 1986, Semirom, Isfahan) is an Iranian wushu athlete who competes in the sanda division. She is a five-time world champion (2011, 2013, 2015, 2017 and 2019).

Her sisters Elaheh Mansourian and Soheila Mansourian are also wushu world champions.
