= Ece Haraç =

Turkish table tennis player (born 2002)

Personal information
- Born: 2002 (age 23–24) Yalova, Turkey

Sport
- Sport: Table tennis
- Club: Fenerbahçe Table Tennis
Medal record
Women's table tennis
Representing Turkey
Mediterranean Games
Gold medal – first place	2026 Taranto	Mixed team
Islamic Solidarity Games
Silver medal – second place	2025 Riyadh	Doubles
Silver medal – second place	2025 Riyadh	Team
Balkan Championships
Gold medal – first place	2025 Istanbul	Doubles
Bronze medal – third place	2025 Istanbul	Singles
Gold medal – first place	2023 Albena	Mixed team
Gold medal – first place	2019 Podgorica	Team
Gold medal – first place	2019 Podgorica	Doubles
Gold medal – first place	2017 Podgorica	U21 Team
WTT Feeder
Gold medal – first place	2026 Tashkent	Mixed team
Bronze medal – third place	2026 Tashkent	Doubles

Ece Haraçr (born 2002) is a Turkish table tennis player. She represents Turkey at international competitions.

== Early years in sport career ==
Haraç started playing table tennis as a hobby at the age of eight, with the support of her teacher in the primary school. Her performance caught her teacher's attention, and he took her to the training sessions of Yalova Belediyespor.

She won many medals in domestic tournaments across all age categories.

== Club career ==
In 2018, Haraç left her hometown club Yalova Belediyespor, where she grew up in the youth system, and transferred in the neighboring city to Bursa BB in 2019, where she was coached by Ersin Sunay, and played in the Turkish Women's Table Tennis Super League. She continued her trainings under the supervision of Bayram Ali Yıldız and Kadri Kocacenk with mostly male players in Yalova, which is home to many national table tennis players.

In 2024, she moved to Germany, and played for TTC 1946 Weinheim in the 2024–25 season of the German top league, TT Damen Bundesliga. Her team finished the league season as champion, as the first time in their history. She became also the first Turkish female table tennis player to win the German league. Returned home, she signed with Fenerbahçe Table Tennis in July.

== International career ==
Haraç was invited to the national team of her age category as she was twelve years old.

She was part of the Turkey women's U21 team, which became 2017 Balkan champion in Podgorica, Montenegro.

At the 2019 Balkan Seniors Championships in Podgorica, Montenegro, she won two gold medals, one in the team and another one in the doubles event. She was part of the team with Sibel Altınkaya and Özge Yılmaz at the 2019 European Championships in Nantes, France.

She won gold medals with Özge Yılmaz in the doubles at the European U21 Championships in 2021 in Spa, Belgium, and in 2022 in Cluj-Napoca, Romania. She became champion in the mixed team event with İbrahim Gündüz at the 2023 Balkan Seniors Championships in Albena, Bulgaria.

At the 2025 Islamic Solidarity Games in Riyadh, Saudi Arabia, she took the silver medal in the doubles event with Özge Yılmaz, and another silver medal in the team event with Sibel Altınkaya and Özge Yılmaz. She was part of the women's team at the 2025 European Championships in Zadar, Croatia, where she failed to win any medal. She competed at the 2025 Summer World University Games in Germany. She became champion in the doubles with Özge Yılmaz, and took the bronze medal in the singles event at the 2025 Balkan Championshşps şn Istanbulü Turkey.

She played at the Europe Smash – Sweden 2026 – Qualification without getting qualified for further round. She received the gold medal in the mixed team event with Abdullah Talha Yiğenler, and a bronze medal in the doubles event with Sibel Altınkaya at the WTT Feeder Tashkent 2026 in Uzbekistan. She won the gold medal in the mixed team event with Abdullah Talha Yiğenler at the 2026 Mediterranean Games in Taranto, Italy.

== Personal life ==
Ece Haraç was born to Behice Jale and Ahmet Başol Haraç in Yalova, Turkey in 2002. Her father played table tennis, was a professional basketball player, and served as a board member in the Yalova Spor and the Turkish Table Tennis Federation. Her brother, Orhan Efe (born 2007), is also a tennis player.

She completed her secondary education at Yalova İstek Koleji, and attended Istanbul Nişantaşı University to study New Media.
