= Majid Rahimian =

Iranian basketball player

No. 7 – Averta Sari
- Position: Guards
- League: Iranian Basketball Super League

Personal information
- Born: 31 October 1997 (age 29) Shahrud, Iran
- Listed height: 6 ft 2 in (1.88 m)
- Listed weight: 191 lb (87 kg)

Career information
- Playing career: 2016–present

Career history
- 2016: Avije Sanat Pars
- 2017: Heyat Basketball Isfahan
- 2018: Padafand Raad Havaei Dezful
- 2019: Mes Kerman
- 2020: Zob Ahan Isfahan BC
- 2021: Sanat Mes Rafsanjan
- 2022: Palayesh Naft Abadan BC
- 2023-Present: Averta Sari
Medals
Men's basketball
Representing Iran
Islamic Solidarity Games
| Silver medal – second place | 2025 Riyadh | 3x3 basketball |

Majid Rahimian (Persian: مجید رحیمیان; born 31 October 1997 in Shahrud) is an Iranian professional basketball player for Averta Sari of the Iranian Basketball Super League.

== Career ==
- Majid Rahimian has a history of playing in the Iranian national 3x3 basketball team and, together with the Iranian national team, has reached the position of runner-up in the FIBA Asia Cup basketball competitions.

== Other Websites ==
Majid Rahimian on Instagram
