= Neda Shahsavari =

Iranian table tennis player

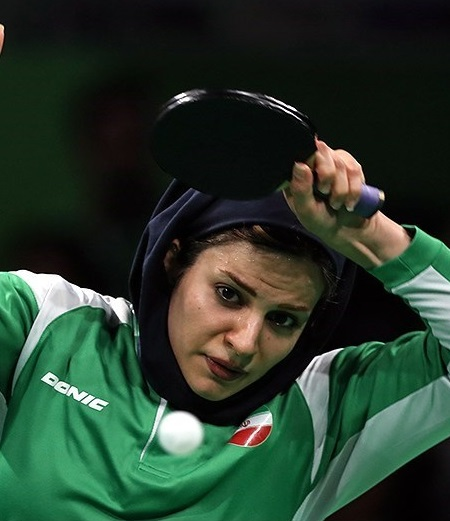
- Shahsavari at the 2016 Summer Olympics

Personal information
- Full name: Neda Shahsavari
- Nationality: Iranian
- Born: 21 September 1986 (age 39) Kermanshah, Iran
- Height: 167.5
- Weight: 67

Sport
- Sport: Table tennis
- Playing style: Shakehand Counter Driver
- Highest ranking: 135 (April 2019)
Medal record
Women's table tennis
Representing Iran
Islamic Solidarity Games
Gold medal – first place	2017 Baku	Team
Gold medal – first place	2021 Konya	Team
Gold medal – first place	2025 Riyadh	Singles
Gold medal – first place	2025 Riyadh	Double
Silver medal – second place	2021 Konya	Singles
Bronze medal – third place	2025 Riyadh	Team

Neda Shahsavari (Persian: ندا شهسواری, born 21 September 1986 in Kermanshah) is an Iranian table tennis player who qualified to compete in the 2012 Summer Olympics in London. Through qualifying, she became the first woman to represent Iran in table tennis for the Olympic Games. She was born in the city of Kermanshah and she studied physical education at university.

== Olympic ==
She has also qualified to play in her second olympics, at Rio 2016. On May 19, 2024, after winning the Central Asia Championship, Shahsavari was able to get a quota for the 2024 Summer Olympics and go to the Olympics for the third time.
