= Uzbekistan at the 2025 Islamic Solidarity Games =

- IOC code: UZB
- NOC: National Olympic Committee of the Republic of Uzbekistan

in Riyadh, Saudi Arabia
- Competitors: 193 in 16 sports
- Medals Ranked 2nd: Gold 9 Silver 12 Bronze 8 Total 29

Islamic Solidarity Games appearances (overview)
- 2005; 2013; 2017; 2021; 2025

Uzbekistan is scheduled to compete at the 2025 Islamic Solidarity Games to be held from 7 to 21 November 2025 in Riyadh, Saudi Arabia.

== Medalists ==
Medals by sport
Sport	1st place, gold medalist(s)	2nd place, silver medalist(s)	3rd place, bronze medalist(s)	Total
Judo	1	1	2	4
Swimming	0	1	0	1
Weightlifting	1	1	1	3
Total	1	2	2	5

Medal	Name	Sport	Event	Date
Gold	Zamohshari Bekmurodov	Judo	Men's 66 kg	8 November
Gold	Adkhamjon Ergashev	Weightlifting	Men's 65 kg Clean & jerk	9 November
Silver	Shakhram Ahadov	Judo	Men's 73 kg	8 November
Silver	Ilya Sibirtsev	Swimming	Men's 1500 m freestyle	8 November
Silver	Adkhamjon Ergashev	Weightlifting	Men's 65 kg Total	9 November
Bronze	Laziza Haydarova	Judo	Women's 48 kg	8 November
Bronze	Shukurjon Aminova	Judo	Women's 57 kg	8 November
Bronze	Adkhamjon Ergashev	Weightlifting	Men's 65 kg snatch	9 November

== Competitors ==
Sport	Men	Women	Total
Athletics	23	18	41
Boxing	3	5	8
Camel racing	1	1	2
Duathlon	1	1	2
Equestrian	4	0	4
Fencing	9	6	15
Futsal	14	0	14
Handball	0	16	16
Ju-jitsu	2	0	2
Judo	7	7	14
Karate	5	5	10
Swimming	12	4	16
Taekwondo	6	6	12
Weightlifting	8	7	15
Para weightlifting	1	2	3
Wrestling	12	6	18
Total	108	85	193

== Futsal ==
==== Group A ====
Pos	Team	Pld	W	D	L	GF	GA	GD	Pts
1	Uzbekistan	3	2	1	0	20	6	+14	7
2	Saudi Arabia	3	2	0	1	12	6	+6	6
3	Azerbaijan	3	1	0	2	7	22	−15	3
4	Libya	3	0	1	2	7	12	−5	1

Source: isg2025
4 November
19:00

Saudi Arabia	2–5	Uzbekistan
Abdullah Al-Maghrabi 19'; Saleh Al-Qarni 38'	Report	Muzaffar Akhadjonov 20'; Muhammadali Khusanboev 29'; Akbar Usmonov 33'; Mashrab Adilov 36'; Abbos Elmurodov 40'

Olympic Committee Complex Green Hall 1, Riyadh

6 November
16:00

Uzbekistan	13–2	Azerbaijan
Ilkhomjon Khamroev 3', 28'; Muzaffar Akhadjonov 10', 23', 35'; Muhammadali Khusanboev 15', 18', 40'; Akbar Usmonov 25', 32'; Abror Akhmetzyanov 27'; Khayrullo Solikhov 30'; Eldor Nigmatov 33'	Report	Emil Həsənzadə 11'; Fərid Abbasov 26'

Olympic Committee Complex Green Hall 1, Riyadh

8 November
16:00

Uzbekistan	2–2	Libya
Mashrab Adilov 32'; Muhammadali Khusanboev 33'	Report	Mohamed Said 20'; Ahmed Al-Yumni 28'

Olympic Committee Complex Green Hall 1, Riyadh

=== Knockout stage ===
Semi-finals
9 November – Riyadh
Morocco (a.e.t.)	6
Saudi Arabia	3
9 November – Riyadh
Uzbekistan	2
Iran	4

Gold medal
11 November – Riyadh
Morocco	0
Iran	5
Bronze medal
11 November – Riyadh
Saudi Arabia	1 (5)
Uzbekistan (p)	1 (6)

==== Semi-finals ====
9 November
16:00

Uzbekistan	2–4	Iran
Shakhzodjon Sadiev 3'; Akbar Usmonov 31'	Report	Masoud Yousef 5'; Salar Aghapour 29'; Moslem Oladghobad 32'; Ali Khalilvand Somehsofla 33'

Olympic Committee Complex Green Hall 1, Riyadh

==== Bronze medal match ====
11 November
16:00

Saudi Arabia	1–1 (a.e.t.)	Uzbekistan
	Report
Penalties
	5–6

Olympic Committee Complex Green Hall 1, Riyadh
Referee: Eisa Abdulhoussain

== Wrestling ==
Men's freestyle

Athlete	Category	Round of 16	Quarterfinals	Semifinals	Repechage	Final / BM	
Athlete	Category	Opponent Result	Opponent Result	Opponent Result	Opponent Result	Opponent Result	Rank
Gulomjon Abdullaev	57 kg						
Umidjon Jalolov	65 kg						
Jafar Chuliboyev	74 kg						
Bobur Islomov	86 kg						
Sherzod Poyonov	97 kg						
Khasanboy Rakhimov	125 kg						

Men's Greco-Roman

Athlete	Category	Round of 16	Quarterfinals	Semifinals	Repechage	Final / BM	
Athlete	Category	Opponent Result	Opponent Result	Opponent Result	Opponent Result	Opponent Result	Rank
Alisher Ganiev	60 kg						
Aytjan Khalmakhanov	67 kg						
Aram Vardanyan	77 kg						
Jalgasbay Berdimuratov	87 kg						
Abdikodir Jalilov	97 kg						
Rafael Tsitsuashvili	130 kg						

Women's freestyle

Athlete	Category	Round of 16	Quarterfinals	Semifinals	Repechage	Final / BM	
Athlete	Category	Opponent Result	Opponent Result	Opponent Result	Opponent Result	Opponent Result	Rank
Aktenge Keunimjaeva	50 kg						
Shokhida Akhmedova	53 kg						
Laylokhon Sobirova	57 kg						
Nigina Sabirova	62 kg						
Sevinchoy Polvonova	68 kg						
Svetlana Oknazarova	76 kg						
