= Algeria at the 2025 Islamic Solidarity Games =

- IOC code: ALG
- NOC: Algerian Olympic Committee

in Riyadh, Saudi Arabia
- Competitors: 117
- Medals Ranked 12th: Gold 5 Silver 8 Bronze 21 Total 34

Islamic Solidarity Games appearances (overview)
- 2005; 2013; 2017; 2021; 2025

Algeria participated in the 2025 Islamic Solidarity Games held in Riyadh, Saudi Arabia, from 7 to 21 November 2025. Algeria was represented by 117 athletes. The Algerian delegation won 34 medals and finished 12th in the overall medal table.

== Medal summary ==
=== Medal table ===
Medal	Name	Sport	Event	Date
Gold	Ismail Benhammouda	Athletics	Men's 5000 metres walk	November
Gold	Zahra Tatar	Athletics	Women's Hammer throw	November
Gold	Nafissa Saad	Para athletics	Women's Discus Throw F56	November
Gold	Ichrak Chaib	Boxing	Women's 65 kg	November
Gold	Jaouad Syoud	Swimming	Men's 400 m individual medley	November
Silver	Sofiane Hamdi	Para athletics	Men's 100m T37	November
Silver	Mohamed Abbas	Boxing	Men's 55 kg	November
Silver	Jugurtha Ait Bekka	Boxing	Men's 65 kg	November
Silver	Jaouad Syoud	Swimming	Men's 200 m breaststroke	November
Silver	Jaouad Syoud	Swimming	Men's 200 m individual medley	November
Silver	Ryma Benmansour; Abdellaoui Samara; Lilia Sihem Midouni; Nesrine Medjahed	Swimming	Women's 4×100 m freestyle	November
Silver	Abdellaoui Samara; Lilia Sihem Midouni; Ryma Benmansour; Nesrine Medjahed	Swimming	Women's 4×200 m freestyle	November
Silver	Bella Maheidine; Jellouli Milhane Amine	Table tennis	Men's doubles	November
Bronze	Anis Chott	Athletics	Men's 1500 metres	November
Bronze	Omar Seraïche	Athletics	Men's 3000 metres steeplechase	November
Bronze	Dhiae Cherif Boudoumi	Athletics	Men's Decathlon	November
Bronze	Fatiha Mansouri	Boxing	Women's 51 kg	November
Bronze	Chahira Selmouni	Boxing	Women's 57 kg	November
Bronze	Omrani Fadia	Ju-jitsu	Women's 63 kg	November
Bronze	Youcef Ziad	Karate	Men's kata	November
Bronze	Ayoub Anis Helassa	Karate	Men's 67 kg	November
Bronze	Falleh Midoune	Karate	Men's 84 kg	November
Bronze	Narimène Dahleb	Karate	Women's kata	November
Bronze	Chaïma Oudira	Karate	Women's +68 kg	November
Bronze	Mechraoui Belkise	Muaythai	Women's 60 kg	November
Bronze	Jihane Benchadli	Swimming	Women's 200 m backstroke	November
Bronze	Imène Kawthar Zitouni	Swimming	Women's 200 m butterfly	November
Bronze	Meroua Merniz; Dounia Monia Chaar; Lilia Sihem Midouni; Nesrine Medjahed	Swimming	Women's 4×100 m medley	November
Bronze	Redouane Bouali; Mehdi Nazim Benbara; Ryma Benmansour; Nesrine Medjahed	Swimming	Mixed 4x100 m freestyle	November
Bronze	Mehdi Bouloussa	Table tennis	Men's singles	November
Bronze	Bella Maheidine; Mehdi Bouloussa; Jellouli Milhane Amine	Table tennis	Men's team	November
Bronze	Bachir Sid Azara	Wrestling	Men's Greco-Roman 87 kg	November
Bronze	Fadi Rouabah	Wrestling	Men's Greco-Roman 97 kg	November
Bronze	Achouak Tekouk	Wrestling	Women's freestyle 57 kg	November

Medals by sport
Sport	1st place, gold medalist(s)	2nd place, silver medalist(s)	3rd place, bronze medalist(s)	Total
Athletics	2	0	3	5
Boxing	1	2	2	5
Ju-jitsu	0	0	1	1
Karate	0	0	5	5
Muaythai	0	0	1	1
Para athletics	1	1	0	2
Swimming	1	4	4	9
Table tennis	0	1	2	3
Wrestling	0	0	3	3
Total	5	8	21	34

Medals by gender
Gender	1st place, gold medalist(s)	2nd place, silver medalist(s)	3rd place, bronze medalist(s)	Total
Male	2	6	10	18
Female	3	2	10	15
Mixed	0	0	1	1
Total	5	8	21	34

=== Athletes with most medals ===
Athlete	Sport	Gold medal	Silver medal	Bronze medal	Total
Nesrine Medjahed	Swimming	0	2	2	4
Jaouad Syoud	Swimming	1	2	0	3
Ryma Benmansour	Swimming	0	2	1	3
Lilia Sihem Midouni	Swimming	0	2	1	3
Abdellaoui Samara	Swimming	0	2	0	2
Bella Maheidine	Table tennis	0	1	1	2
Jellouli Milhane Amine	Table tennis	0	1	1	2
Mehdi Bouloussa	Table tennis	0	0	2	2
