= Anis =

- Gender: Male - Female

Other gender
- Feminine: Anisa

Origin
- Meaning: Genial, close friend

Other names
- Variant form: Enis

Anis (Arabic: أنيس) is a masculine given name and surname of Arabic origin.

The name Anis is an Arabic name that developed in North Africa and is very common in Morocco. In the Balkans, Anis is popular among Bosniaks in the former Yugoslav nations. It is also popular among Albanians. The name is a modification to the Arabic name Enis, and it holds the same meanings of "genial" and "close friend."

The female equivalent to Anis is Anissa or Anisa (for example, Anisa Guajardo).

== Given name ==
=== In arts ===
- Anis Mohamed Youssef Ferchichi, German rapper known as Bushido (born 1978)
- Anis Chouchène (born 1982), Tunisian poet and activist
- Anis Chowdhury (1929–1990), Bangladeshi writer
- Anis Don Demina (born 1993), Swedish media personality
- Anis Djaad (1974–2026), Algerian film director
- Anis Farooqi (1938–1994), Indian painter
- Anis Fuleihan (1900–1970), Cypriot-born American composer
- Anis Halloway, Sierra Leonean songwriter
- Anis Kachohi (born 1977), French country singer
- Anis Lassoued (born 1972), Tunisian film director
- Anis Mansour (1924–2011), Egyptian writer
- Anis Mojgani (born 1977), American spoken-word poet
- Anis Nagi (1939–2010), Pakistani poet
- Anis Al-Rafii (born 1976), Moroccan storyteller
- Anis Sabirin (born 1936), Malaysian writer
- Anis Shimada (born 1975), lead singer of the Japanese band Monoral

=== In politics ===
- Anis Birou (born 1962), Moroccan politician
- Anis Byarwati (born 1967), Indonesian politician
- Anis Haroon (born 1947), Pakistani politician and women's rights activist
- Anis Kaimkhani, Pakistani politician
- Anis Kidwai (1906–1982), Indian politician, writer, and activist
- Anis Matta (born 1968), Indonesian politician
- Anis al-Qaq (born 1947), Palestinian politician
- Anis Hassan Yahya (1934–2026), Yemeni politician

=== In sport ===
- Anis Ahmed (born 1973), field hockey player
- Anis Aissaoui (born 1973), Tunisian footballer
- Anis Ajroud (born 2002), Tunisian footballer
- Anis Ananenka (born 1985), Belarusian middle-distance runner
- Anis Ayari (born 1982), Tunisian footballer
- Anis Porat Ayash (born 2005), Israeli footballer
- Anis Boujelbene (born 1978), Tunisian footballer
- Anis Boussaïdi (born 1981), Tunisian footballer
- Anis Bouzid (born 1995), Belgian-Moroccan kickboxer and boxer
- Anis Chedly (born 1981), Tunisian judoka
- Anis Gallali (born 1972), Tunisian long jumper
- Anis Ghorbel (born 1989), Tunisian tennis player
- Anis Hedidane (born 1986), Tunisian basketball player
- Anis Khedher (born 1991), Tunisian footballer
- Anis Khemaissia (born 1999), Algerian footballer
- Anis Lounifi (born 1978), Tunisian judoka
- Anis Mehmeti (born 2001), English footballer of Albanian descent
- Anis Hadj Moussa (born 2002), Algerian footballer
- Anis Nabar (born 1992), Indonesian footballer
- Anis Nuur (born 1997), Somali footballer
- Anis Ouzenadji (born 2006), French footballer
- Anis Riahi (born 1971), Tunisian decathlete
- Anis Saltou (born 1992), Libyan footballer
- Anis Selmouni (born 1979), Moroccan athlete
- Anis Siddiqi (born 1959), Pakistani cricketer
- Anis Ben Slimane (born 2001), Tunisian footballer
- Anis Yadir (born 2004), Dutch footballer
- Anis Zouaoui (born 1992), Qatari handball player

=== In other fields ===
- Anis Ahmad (born 1944), Pakistani social scientist, educationist and professor
- Anis al-Dawla (1842–1896), Iranian royal consort
- Anis Ud Dowla (born 1937), Bangladeshi businessman
- Anis Ebeid (1909–1988), Egyptian translator
- Anis Freiha (1903–1993), Lebanese scholar
- Anis Haffar, educational theorist, teacher, columnist and author
- Anis Hidayah (born 1976), Indonesian activist
- Anis al-Naqqash (1951–2021), Lebanese political analyst
- Anis Sayigh (1931–2009), Palestinian historian
- Anis Shorrosh (1933–2018), Palestinian Evangelical Christian author, speaker, and pastor

== Surname ==
- Mir Babar Ali Anis (1802–1874), Urdu poet from northern India
- Mohammed Mohiedin Anis (born 1947), Syrian car collector

== See also ==
- SS Anis, a coastal tanker
- Ani (bird)
- A short form of Anisette, anise-flavored liqueur
- Anisa (disambiguation) or Anieca, female forms of the name
- Anisur Rahman (disambiguation)
