= Enes =

Male given name

- Gender: Male

Other gender
- Feminine: Enesa

Other names
- Variant forms: Ernes, Arnes, Mirnes, Irnes
- Related names: Enis

Enes is a Turkish male given name derived from the Arabic name Anas. The name originates from one of the companions of the Islamic prophet Muhammad, Anas ibn Malik.

In the Balkans, Enes is popular among Bosniaks in the former Yugoslav nations and is also common among Albanians. In this region, the female equivalent of Enes is Enesa. Among the groups in this region that use this name, there are variant ways the name is spelled: Ernes/Ernesa, Anes/Anesa (for example, Anesa Kajtazović), and Arnes/Arnesa.

== Given name ==
- Enes Alić (born 1999), Bosnian footballer
- Enes Başar (born 1993), Turkish wrestler
- Enes Batur (born 1998), Turkish YouTuber
- Enes Begović (born 1965), Bosnian singer
- Enes Bešić (born 1963), Bosnian footballer
- Enes Bulut (born 2001), Turkish karateka
- Enes Demirović (born 1972), Bosnian footballer
- Enes Erkan (born 1987), Turkish karateka
- Enes Fermino (born 1987), Swiss footballer
- Enes Hadžibulić (born 1981), Macedonian basketball player
- Enes Hocaoğulları (born 2002), Turkish human rights activist
- Enes Ibrahim (born 1984), Macedonian politician
- Enes Isufi (born 2000), Albanian footballer
- Enes Kanter Freedom (born 1992), Turkish–American basketball player
- Enes Karakuş (born 2001), Turkish footballer
- Enes Karić (born 1958), Bosnian Islamic scholar
- Enes Kaya (born 1984), Turkish TV personality
- Enes Keskin (born 2001), Turkish footballer
- Enes Kızılcık (born 2001), Turkish triathlete
- Enes Kubat (born 1994), Turkish footballer
- Enes Küç (born 1996), German footballer
- Enes Kuka (born 2002), Albanian footballer
- Enes Kuşku (born 1994), Turkish rower
- Enes Mahmutović (born 1997), Bosnian footballer
- Enes Mameledžija (born 1949), Bosnian footballer
- Enes Meral (born 2000), Turkish-German rapper
- Enes Muhić (born 1961), Bosnian footballer
- Enes Mešanović (born 1975), Bosnian footballer
- Enes Novinić (born 1985), Croatian footballer
- Enes Özdemir (born 2002), Turkish karateka
- Enes Rujovič (born 1989), Slovenian footballer
- Enes Sağlık (born 1991), Belgian-Turkish footballer
- Enes Sali (born 2006), Bosnian footballer
- Enes Sipović (born 1990), Bosnian footballer
- Enes Tepecik (born 2004), Turkish-Austrian footballer
- Enes Tubluk (born 2000), Turkish-German footballer
- Enes Uğurlu (born 1989), Turkish archer
- Enes Ünal (born 1997), Turkish footballer
- Enes Uslu (born 1996), Turkish wrestler

== Middle name ==
- Cenk Enes Özer (born 1978), Turkish novelist
- Mehmet Enes Sığırcı (born 1993), Turkish footballer
- Muhammed Enes Kiprit (born 1999), Turkish-German footballer

== See also ==
- Enos (disambiguation), includes list of people with given name Enos
