= Eno =

Eno may refer to:

== Music ==
- English National Opera, London
- Eno, an album by Japanese band Polysics

== Organisations and businesses ==
- Eno (company), a Chinese clothing and accessories business
- Eno Center for Transportation, a non-profit think tank in Washington, D.C.
- European Northern Observatory, a group of astronomical observatories
- Environment Online, an international educational network

== Places ==
- Eno, Finland, a former municipality, now part of Joensuu
- Eno, North Carolina, United States, an unincorporated community
- Eno River, North Carolina

== Name ==
- Eno (surname)

=== In music ===
- Brian Eno (born 1948), English musician and record producer, brother of Roger Eno
- Roger Eno (born 1959), English musician and brother of Brian Eno
- Eno Barony (born 1991), Ghanaian rapper
- Eno (rapper) (born 1998), German rapper

=== Other fields ===
- Eno Benjamin (born 1999), American football player
- Eno Raud (1928–1996), Estonian children's books writer
- Daikan Enō, the Japanese name of Zen patriarch Dajian Huineng

== Peoples ==
- Eno people, North American tribe
- Eno, a name given to Ibibio people

== Other uses ==
- Eno Cordova, a Jedi Master and character in the 2019 video game Star Wars Jedi: Fallen Order
- Eno (drug), an antacid
- Eno (1973 film), a documentary short film
- Eno (2024 film), a documentary film
- En'ō, a Japanese era
- Exhaled nitric oxide, measured in a breath test for asthma
- Essentially non-oscillatory (ENO) schemes, methods for numerically solving partial differential equations

== See also ==
- Enno (disambiguation)
- Enos (disambiguation)
