= Enos =

Enos or Enosh (Hebrew: אֱנוֹשׁ, Standard Enosh, Tiberian ʼĔnôš; "mortal man”) may refer to:

== People in religious scripture ==
- Enos (biblical figure), a genealogical figure in the Bible.
- The Book of Enos, one of the books that make up the Book of Mormon
  - Enos (Book of Mormon prophet), author of the Book of Enos

== People ==
=== Single name ===
- Enosh (Nestorian patriarch), patriarch of the Church of the East between 877 and 884

=== Given name ===
- Enos Cabell (born 1949), American baseball player
- Enos D. Hopping (1805–1847), U.S. Army general of the Mexican–American War
- Enos Stanley Kroenke (born 1947), American businessman
- Enos McLeod (born 1946), Jamaican reggae singer and music producer
- Enos Semore (1931–2025), American college baseball coach
- Enos T. Throop (1784–1874), Governor of NY State
- Enos Warren Persons (1836–1899), American politician
- Enos Slaughter (1916–2002), American baseball player

=== Surname ===
- Enos (surname)

== Other ==
- Enos, Indiana, an unincorporated community
- Enos, Turkey, a town
- Enos (butterfly), a gossamer-winged butterfly genus
- Enos (chimpanzee), a chimpanzee who launched into space
- ENOS Rescue-System, an electronic rescue and locating system for use by divers at sea
- eNOS, the enzyme endothelial nitric oxide synthase
- Enos Strate, a character in the TV series The Dukes of Hazzard
  - Enos (TV series), a spin-off series about the character
- Enos Fry, a fictional character in the animated TV series Futurama, originally the grandfather of Philip J. Fry

== See also ==
- Enes, male given name
- Eno (disambiguation)
