= 2025 European Triathlon Championships =

Triathlon competition

- Location: Istanbul, Turkey
- Dates: 30–31 August

The 2025 Europe Triathlon Championships Istanbul, also known as the 2025 European Triathlon Championships were held in Istanbul, Turkey, on 30 and 31 August 2025. THe event crowned the continental champions for the season over the standard or 'Olympic' distance.

== format ==
For the first time, the European titles were contested within a combined event marketed as the 2025 Asia & Europe Triathlon Championships, with athletes from both continents sharing one venue. Standard‐distance races (1.5 km swim, 40 km bike, 10 km run) for elite men and women determined the European champions among a strong international field. However, some athletes were not present because the timing of the event clashed with both a T100 triathlon event and a World Triathlon Championship Series event on the French Riviera.

== Venue ==
The championship course featured a 1.5 km swim in the Bosphorus Strait, a 40 km bike leg crossing the Bosphorus Bridge (closed to traffic for competition), and a 10 km run through Istanbul's historic districts straddling Europe and Asia.

== Schedule ==
All times are local (UTC+3).

Date	Time	Event
30 August 2025	08:00	Men's elite individual
31 August 2025	08:00	Women's elite individual

== Medal summary ==
Games	Gold		Silver		Bronze	
Elite men	Max Studer; Switzerland	1:44:18	Bence Bicsák; Hungary	1:44:39	Panagiotis Bitados; Greece	1:44:52
Elite women	Jolien Vermeylen; Belgium	1:55:35	Diana Isakova; Individual Neutral Athletes	1:55:42	Tilly Anema; Great Britain	1:55:45

== Medal table ==
* Host nation (Turkey)

Rank	Nation	Gold	Silver	Bronze	Total
1	Belgium (BEL)	1	0	0	1
1	Switzerland (SUI)	1	0	0	1
3	Hungary (HUN)	0	1	0	1
–	Individual Neutral Athletes (AIN)	0	1	0	1
4	Great Britain (GBR)	0	0	1	1
4	Greece (GRE)	0	0	1	1
Totals (5 entries)		2	2	2	6

== Full results ==
=== Men ===
64 athletes too the line, with 52 completing the race.

Rank	Bib	Athlete	Swim	T1	Bike	T2	Run	Total Time
1st place, gold medalist(s)	45	Max Studer (SUI)	0:18:44	0:00:48	0:53:37	0:00:19	0:30:52	1:44:18
2nd place, silver medalist(s)	12	Bence Bicsák (HUN)	0:18:50	0:00:50	0:53:36	0:00:23	0:31:03	1:44:39
3rd place, bronze medalist(s)	26	Panagiotis Bitados (GRE)	0:18:36	0:00:45	0:53:47	0:00:21	0:31:25	1:44:52
4	15	Harry Leleu (GBR)	0:18:41	0:00:48	0:53:45	0:00:19	0:31:25	1:44:56
5	4	Jack Willis (GBR)	0:18:45	0:00:45	0:53:42	0:00:20	0:31:31	1:45:01
6	9	Tjebbe Kaindl (AUT)	0:18:48	0:00:42	0:53:40	0:00:22	0:31:34	1:45:04
7	20	Jules Rethoret (FRA)	0:18:32	0:00:50	0:53:47	0:00:20	0:31:44	1:45:11
8	7	Antonio Serrat (ESP)	0:19:02	0:00:46	0:54:00	0:00:17	0:31:15	1:45:18
9	21	Ian Pennekamp (NED)	0:18:35	0:00:47	0:53:50	0:00:20	0:31:55	1:45:26
10	11	Igor Dupuis (FRA)	0:18:34	0:00:49	0:53:52	0:00:22	0:31:57	1:45:31
11	37	Izan Edo (ESP)	0:18:54	0:00:47	0:53:30	0:00:24	0:32:17	1:45:49
12	28	Jonas Osterholt (GER)	0:18:43	0:00:49	0:53:35	0:00:22	0:32:29	1:45:55
13	50	Lucas Cambresy (LUX)	0:18:31	0:00:49	0:53:50	0:00:19	0:32:35	1:46:02
14	14	Nicola Azzano (ITA)	0:18:30	0:00:47	0:53:56	0:00:20	0:32:37	1:46:08
15	33	João Batista (POR)	0:19:17	0:00:51	0:53:36	0:00:23	0:32:09	1:46:13
16	8	Euan De Nigro (ITA)	0:18:48	0:00:47	0:53:32	0:00:22	0:32:55	1:46:23
17	22	Arnaud Mengal (BEL)	0:19:28	0:00:49	0:53:29	0:00:23	0:32:25	1:46:31
18	31	Denis Kolobrodov (AIN)	0:19:03	0:00:47	0:53:52	0:00:22	0:32:35	1:46:37
19	24	Pietro Giovannini (ITA)	0:18:31	0:00:46	0:53:49	0:00:21	0:33:20	1:46:46
20	51	Eirik Berling Grande (NOR)	0:18:48	0:00:46	0:53:38	0:00:18	0:33:19	1:46:47
21	35	Zsombor Dévay (HUN)	0:18:51	0:00:49	0:53:32	0:00:26	0:33:30	1:47:05
22	39	Till Kramp (GER)	0:19:40	0:00:48	0:53:16	0:00:21	0:33:20	1:47:23
23	38	Jimmy Lund (GBR)	0:18:33	0:00:49	0:53:53	0:00:21	0:33:57	1:47:31
24	19	Chris Ziehmer (GER)	0:18:38	0:00:47	0:53:50	0:00:24	0:34:13	1:47:51
25	18	Genis Grau (ESP)	0:19:01	0:00:48	0:53:58	0:00:20	0:34:09	1:48:14
26	42	Gültigin Er (TUR)	0:18:59	0:00:50	0:54:00	0:00:23	0:34:23	1:48:33
27	36	Sylvain Fridelance (SUI)	0:18:40	0:00:48	0:54:18	0:00:23	0:34:41	1:48:47
28	16	Eric Diener (GER)	0:19:00	0:00:48	0:53:27	0:00:22	0:35:28	1:49:02
29	6	Alessio Crociani (ITA)	0:18:28	0:00:47	0:53:58	0:00:22	0:35:37	1:49:09
30	1	Gergely Kiss (HUN)	0:18:36	0:00:42	0:53:56	0:00:21	0:35:40	1:49:13
31	25	Lukas Pertl (AUT)	0:19:38	0:00:47	0:56:23	0:00:19	0:32:17	1:49:22
32	5	Maciej Bruździak (POL)	0:18:27	0:00:46	0:53:59	0:00:23	0:35:58	1:49:30
33	55	Enes Kızılcık (TUR)	0:18:58	0:00:47	0:54:03	0:00:22	0:35:29	1:49:37
34	52	Mikhail Antipov (AIN)	0:18:59	0:00:50	0:53:58	0:00:21	0:35:40	1:49:46
35	34	Joris Basslé (BEL)	0:19:42	0:00:49	0:56:16	0:00:18	0:33:09	1:50:13
36	10	Grigory Antipov (AIN)	0:18:54	0:00:48	0:54:05	0:00:23	0:36:25	1:50:33
37	58	Carol Popa (ROU)	0:19:43	0:00:52	0:56:14	0:00:19	0:33:40	1:50:46
38	60	Petter Ellingsbø (NOR)	0:19:45	0:00:47	0:56:18	0:00:22	0:34:35	1:51:46
39	27	Felix Duchampt (ROU)	0:20:52	0:00:50	0:57:08	0:00:24	0:32:37	1:51:49
40	40	Victor Goené (NED)	0:19:35	0:00:47	0:56:25	0:00:21	0:35:39	1:52:44
41	54	Mikita Katsianeu (AIN)	0:20:56	0:00:48	0:57:08	0:00:21	0:33:45	1:52:56
42	41	Veikka Saren (FIN)	0:20:59	0:00:49	0:57:04	0:00:21	0:33:53	1:53:03
43	57	Ul Denša (SLO)	0:19:46	0:00:50	0:56:16	0:00:25	0:36:09	1:53:23
44	29	Benedikt Bettin (GER)	0:18:44	0:00:49	0:53:40	0:00:21	0:40:41	1:54:13
45	30	Gergő Dobi (HUN)	0:19:26	0:00:50	0:55:26	0:00:23	0:38:12	1:54:14
46	62	Oliver Hostrup Sahlberg (DEN)	0:18:51	0:00:51	0:57:10	0:00:23	0:37:10	1:54:23
47	44	Niklas Keller (AUT)	0:20:41	0:00:48	0:57:20	0:00:19	0:35:57	1:55:03
48	48	Artjoms Gajevskis (LAT)	0:18:53	0:00:49	0:59:11	0:00:20	0:36:17	1:55:27
49	47	Filip Michálek (CZE)	0:19:37	0:00:53	0:56:23	0:00:21	0:38:38	1:55:50
50	23	Baptiste Passemard (FRA)	0:18:42	0:00:51	0:53:37	0:00:22	0:42:34	1:56:04
51	49	Ibe Baelde (BEL)	0:20:58	0:00:47	0:57:08	0:00:20	0:37:53	1:57:04
52	63	Daniil Babanschi (MDA)	0:20:56	0:00:51	0:57:07	0:00:24	0:40:49	2:00:06
NR	3	Max Stapley (GBR)	0:18:35	0:00:48	0:53:47	0:00:20	Lapped	
NR	66	Taha Eren Coşgun (TUR)	0:20:53	0:00:51	0:57:12	0:00:23	Did not finish	
NR	56	Martin Demuth (TRI)	0:18:41	0:00:50	Did not finish			
NR	46	Pavel Sorokin (AIN)	0:18:47	0:00:51	Did not finish			
NR	43	David Castro (ESP)	0:18:52	0:00:51	Did not finish			
NR	17	Samuele Angelini (ITA)	0:18:52	0:00:49	Did not finish			
NR	2	Sebastian Wernersen (NOR)	0:19:43	0:00:46	Did not finish			
NR	32	Philip Pertl (AUT)	0:20:16	0:00:48	Did not finish			
NR	61	Boris Andreev (BUL)	0:20:50	0:00:52	Did not finish			
NR	53	Theo Marti (LUX)	0:21:03	0:00:58	Did not finish			
NR	64	Burak Çağdaş (TUR)	0:21:05	0:00:52	Did not finish			
NR	59	Francis Daniels Veģeris (LAT)	0:21:07	0:00:48	Did not finish			

=== Women ===
51 triathlete took the line, with 44 finishing.

Rank	Bib	Athlete	Swim	T1	Bike	T2	Run	Total Time
1st place, gold medalist(s)	3	Jolien Vermeylen (BEL)	0:20:10	0:00:53	0:59:28	0:00:21	0:34:44	1:55:35
2nd place, silver medalist(s)	4	Diana Isakova (AIN)	0:20:09	0:00:52	0:59:36	0:00:22	0:34:45	1:55:42
3rd place, bronze medalist(s)	22	Tilly Anema (GBR)	0:19:56	0:00:52	0:59:50	0:00:21	0:34:48	1:55:45
4	5	Bianca Seregni (ITA)	0:20:08	0:00:58	0:59:30	0:00:28	0:35:10	1:56:13
5	8	Zuzana Michaličková (SVK)	0:20:09	0:00:55	0:59:29	0:00:22	0:35:33	1:56:26
6	12	Sara Guerrero (ESP)	0:20:13	0:00:49	0:59:34	0:00:20	0:35:45	1:56:39
7	20	Angelica Prestia (ITA)	0:20:21	0:00:52	0:59:20	0:00:23	0:35:51	1:56:46
8	14	Marta Pintanel (ESP)	0:20:05	0:00:52	0:59:34	0:00:21	0:36:04	1:56:55
9	9	Maria Tomé (POR)	0:20:10	0:00:54	0:59:31	0:00:26	0:36:08	1:57:06
10	17	Barbara de Koning (NED)	0:20:12	0:00:54	0:59:33	0:00:23	0:36:07	1:57:07
11	6	Verena Steinhauser (ITA)	0:20:18	0:00:53	0:59:24	0:00:24	0:36:12	1:57:08
12	1	Alice Betto (ITA)	0:20:19	0:00:49	0:59:29	0:00:24	0:36:10	1:57:09
13	7	Ilaria Zane (ITA)	0:20:13	0:00:52	0:59:26	0:00:22	0:36:55	1:57:45
14	15	Tereza Zimovjanová (CZE)	0:20:32	0:00:50	0:59:11	0:00:23	0:37:03	1:57:57
15	19	Robin Dreijling (NED)	0:20:33	0:00:55	0:59:05	0:00:25	0:37:17	1:58:13
16	16	Nora Gmür (SUI)	0:20:12	0:00:54	0:59:25	0:00:23	0:37:34	1:58:26
17	26	Katie Rodda (GBR)	0:20:06	0:00:51	0:59:39	0:00:22	0:37:44	1:58:40
18	41	Valentina Riasova (AIN)	0:21:17	0:00:52	1:00:18	0:00:23	0:36:11	1:58:58
19	18	Annabel Morton (GBR)	0:21:10	0:00:54	1:00:26	0:00:23	0:36:21	1:59:12
20	49	Hasse Fleerackers (BEL)	0:20:12	0:00:50	0:59:32	0:00:21	0:38:40	1:59:32
21	48	Ellie White (GBR)	0:20:13	0:00:54	0:59:31	0:00:22	0:38:45	1:59:43
22	2	Selina Klamt (GER)	0:20:08	0:00:47	0:59:39	0:00:12	0:39:15	2:00:00
23	28	María Teresa Guerrero (ESP)	0:20:33	0:00:53	1:01:01	0:00:24	0:37:16	2:00:05
24	36	Martina McDowell (ITA)	0:20:04	0:00:53	0:59:39	0:00:23	0:39:15	2:00:12
25	45	Clara Carlquist (DEN)	0:20:30	0:00:54	0:59:15	0:00:24	0:39:21	2:00:22
26	44	Michaela Sterbova (CZE)	0:20:08	0:00:54	0:59:35	0:00:28	0:39:35	2:00:40
27	25	Alessia Orla (ROU)	0:20:33	0:00:55	1:01:01	0:00:32	0:37:53	2:00:51
28	27	Josephine Seerig (GER)	0:20:22	0:00:50	0:59:25	0:00:27	0:39:50	2:00:52
29	37	Romana Gajdošová (SVK)	0:20:33	0:00:53	1:00:58	0:00:22	0:38:25	2:01:09
30	21	Finja Schierl (GER)	0:20:22	0:00:53	0:59:19	0:00:23	0:40:23	2:01:18
31	30	Felipa Herrmann (GER)	0:21:05	0:00:51	1:00:28	0:00:21	0:38:57	2:01:40
32	24	Rebecca Beti (SUI)	0:21:11	0:00:51	1:00:25	0:00:29	0:38:51	2:01:45
33	52	Iana Chenskaia (AIN)	0:20:28	0:01:01	1:01:00	0:00:25	0:39:02	2:01:53
34	42	Nele Dequae (BEL)	0:21:20	0:00:52	1:00:13	0:00:23	0:39:11	2:01:57
35	46	Tatiana Baskakova (AIN)	0:20:31	0:00:50	1:02:28	0:00:32	0:37:41	2:02:00
36	32	Madalena Amaral Almeida (POR)	0:21:18	0:00:54	1:00:11	0:00:22	0:39:25	2:02:08
37	33	Sophie Gießmann (GER)	0:21:17	0:00:52	1:00:20	0:00:20	0:40:11	2:02:57
38	23	Xisca Tous Servera (TUR)	0:20:36	0:00:53	1:01:00	0:00:22	0:40:24	2:03:13
39	35	Diana Dunajská (SVK)	0:21:32	0:00:50	1:02:35	0:00:26	0:38:06	2:03:27
40	50	Helena Knaapi (FIN)	0:21:22	0:00:52	1:02:45	0:00:24	0:38:54	2:04:15
41	39	Mariana Vargem (POR)	0:22:44	0:00:59	1:03:46	0:00:27	0:37:13	2:05:07
42	43	Désirée Gmür (SUI)	0:20:26	0:00:54	1:01:10	0:00:33	0:43:27	2:06:29
43	51	Yeva Soroka (UKR)	0:22:33	0:00:47	1:04:06	0:00:20	0:39:05	2:06:50
44	47	Sofya Kryvetskaya (AIN)	0:22:37	0:00:52	1:03:59	0:00:24	0:43:10	2:11:01
NR	34	Paulina Klimas (POL)	0:20:11	0:00:54	0:59:32	0:00:24	Did not finish	
NR	38	Alejandra Seguí (ESP)	0:21:13	0:00:52	1:00:22	0:00:21	Did not finish	
NR	10	Miriam Casillas (ESP)	0:20:31	0:00:53	1:01:02	0:00:24	Did not finish	
NR	40	Hanna Maksimava (AIN)	0:21:37	0:00:59	1:04:50	0:00:22	Did not finish	
NR	11	Sandra Dodet (FRA)	0:20:28	0:00:55	Did not finish			
NR	31	Alžběta Hrušková (CZE)	0:21:29	0:00:52	Did not finish			
NR	29	Sophie Alden (GBR)	0:20:22	0:01:03	Lapped			

== Handover to Tarragona ==
At the closing ceremony, hosting duties for the next edition were officially transferred to Tarragona, Spain, which will stage the 2026 European Triathlon Championships in June 2026.
