= Enno =

Enno may refer to:

== People ==
=== Given name ===
- Enno I, Count of Ostfriesland (1460–1491)
- Enno II, Count of Ostfriesland (1505–1540)
- Enno III, Count of Ostfriesland (1563–1625)
- Enno Brandrøk (1538–1571), Norwegian noble- and highwayman (named after Enno II, Count of Ostfriesland)
- Enno Cheng (born 1987), Taiwanese singer, actress, and author
- Enno Edzardisna (c. 1380–c. 1450), East Frisian chieftain
- Enno Hagenah (born 1957), German politician
- Enno Hallek (1931–2025), Swedish artist and academic
- Enno Lend (born 1957), Estonian economist and rector
- Enno Littmann (1875–1958), German orientalist
- Enno Mõts (born 1974), Estonian military officer
- Enno Ootsing (born 1940), Estonian artist and academic
- Enno Patalas (1929–2018), German film historian
- Enno Penno (1930–2016), Estonian politician

=== Surname ===
- Ernst Enno (1875–1934), Estonian poet and writer

== Other ==
- En'ō, Japanese era name after Ryakunin and before Ninji
- Enno, Estonia, village in Nõo Parish, Tartu County, Estonia
- Enno, brand of the Metronom Eisenbahngesellschaft

== See also ==
- Eno (disambiguation)
