= Anisa (disambiguation) =

Anisa was a town of ancient Cappadocia. It may also refer to:

== Given name ==
- Anisa Angarola, American guitarist
- Anisa Butt (born 1993), British-Indian actress
- Anisa Guajardo (born 1991), Mexican-American footballer
- Anisa Hajimumin (born 1978), Somali American politician
- Anisa Ibrahim (born 1987), Somali-American doctor
- Anisa Kospiri (born 1980), Miss Universe Albania
- Anisa Makhlouf (1930–2016), first lady of Syria
- Anisa Mehdi, Iraqi-Canadian film director and journalist
- Anisa Mohammed (born 1988), Trinidadian cricketer
- Anisa Morridadi (born 1990), British entrepreneur
- Anisa Nandaula (born 1998/99), Ugandan-born Australian comedian
- Anisa Petrova (born 1970), Uzbekistani fencer
- Anisa Rasooli (born 1969), Afghan judge
- Anisa Rola (born 1994), Slovenian footballer
- Anisa Sayyed (born 1980), Indian pistol shooter
- Anisa Shaheed (born 1986), Afghan journalist
- Anisa Zeb Tahirkheli, Pakistani politician
- Anisa Wahab (1957–2010), Afghan actress and singer
- Anisa Yotpinit (born 1998), Thai volleyball player

== Fictional characters ==
- Anisa, is a thief who appears in Saladin: The Animated Series
