= Anis Haffar =

Ghanaian educationist

- Education: Mfantsipim School, Cape Coast; California State University; California State Polytechnic University
- Occupations: Educationist, teacher, columnist, author, journalist
- Known for: Founder of the GATE Institute, Ghana
- Notable work: Strategies for Effective Teaching and Learning, 2019
- Website: anishaffar.com

Anis Haffar is a Ghanaian educationist, teacher, columnist and author. He is the founder of the GATE institute in Ghana, and is a council member of the Ghana Education Service. Also a journalist, he writes a weekly column for the Daily Graphic newspaper entitled "Education Matters with Anis Haffar", and the column "Leaders – Human Capital", in Business World (Ghana). Haffar was listed as one of the 100 most influential Africans of 2016 in Education by New African magazine.

== Background ==
Haffar attended Mfantsipim School, Cape Coast, and earned a business degree from California State University, Los Angeles, and did graduate work at the School of Education at California State Polytechnic University, Pomona. He began his professional career with the Los Angeles Unified School District, where for 10 years (1984–94) he taught English Language, English Literature, and Communication Skills, and he coordinated a gifted and talented education (GATE) programme introduced by the State of California. In addition he taught English as a Second Language (ESL) in La Puente, California, at the Dibble Adult School in California for immigrants seeking American citizenship.

In Ghana in 1996 he set up the GATE Institute in order to update administrators and teachers in current trends in education, and has designed workshops for teachers and schools across the country. He has conducted seminars at educational institutions and makes regular appearances on radio and television on topics including education, youth policy and youth empowerment. He serves as the Chief Examiner of Citi FM's annual "Write Away Contest", which promotes reading and writing skills among young people.

As a senior lecturer, Haffar teaches creative and critical thinking at Accra College of Medicine; additionally, he chairs the Board of Governors of Tema International School, is a board member of AGA School, Obuasi, Academic City College, Accra, and Aspire School, Koforidua, is a member of council of the Ghana Education Service, and was a member of the Expert Commission on National Vision and Plan for Tertiary Education in Ghana.

His writing encompasses weekly newspaper columns – "Education Matters with Anis Haffar" in The Daily Graphic and "Leaders – Human Capital", in Business World (Ghana) – as well as other essays on cultural and topical issues, and his published books include Strategies for Effective Teaching and Learning (2019).

== Books ==
- Leadership: Reflections on Some Movers, Shakers and Thinkers, GATE Institute Press, 2010. ISBN 9789988134556
- Mfantsipim: The Makers of a Great School, GATE Institute Press, 2013. ISBN 978-9988182106
- Strategies for Effective Teaching and Learning, 2019
