= Eno (surname) =

Eno or Éno is a surname, and may refer to:

- Amable Éno, dit Deschamps (1785–1875), political figure in Quebec
- Amos Eno (1810–1898), American real estate investor and capitalist in New York City
- Brian Eno (born 1948), English electronic musician, music theorist and record producer
- Edgar Eno (born 1841), American politician from Wisconsin
- Henry Lane Eno (1871–1928), American psychologist and writer
- James Crossley Eno (1820–1915), British pharmacist
- Jim Eno (born 1966), American drummer, a founding member of Spoon
- Kenji Eno (1970–2013), Japanese musician and video game designer
- Moataz Eno (born 1983), Egyptian footballer
- Norbert Éno (1793–1841), merchant and politician in Lower Canada
- Roger Eno (born 1959), English ambient composer, brother of Brian Eno
- Sarah Eno, American physicist
- Umo Eno (born 1964), Nigerian clergyman and politician
- Will Eno (born 1965), American playwright
- William Phelps Eno (1858–1945), American businessman

== See also ==
- Enos (surname)
