= Duathlon at the 2025 Islamic Solidarity Games =

- Venue: Boulevard City
- Dates: 14—15 November 2025
- Competitors: 36 from 16 nations

The Duathlon tournament at the 2025 Islamic Solidarity Games in Riyadh was held between 14—15 November 2025. The duathlon competition took place at Boulevard City in Saudi Arabia.

== Medal table ==
* Host nation (Saudi Arabia)

Rank	Nation	Gold	Silver	Bronze	Total
1	Turkey	1	1	1	3
2	Morocco	1	0	1	2
3	Uzbekistan	0	1	0	1
Totals (3 entries)		2	2	2	6

== Medal overview ==
Event	Gold	Silver	Bronze
Men's Sprint Race	Mohamed Nemsi; Morocco	Enes Kızılcık; Turkey	Gültigin Er; Turkey
Women's Sprint Race	Xisca Tous; Turkey	Alina Khakimova; Uzbekistan	Ghizlane Assou; Morocco

== Participating nations ==
A total of 36 athletes from 16 nations competed in wushu at the 2025 Islamic Solidarity Games:

1. Algeria (3)
2. Azerbaijan (2)
3. Bahrain (3)
4. Iran (6)
5. Iraq (1)
6. Kuwait (1)
7. Kyrgyzstan (2)
8. Morocco (2)
9. Qatar (2)
10. Saudi Arabia (2)
11. Sierra Leone (3)
12. Syria (1)
13. Togo (1)
14. Turkey (3)
15. United Arab Emirates (2)
16. Uzbekistan (2)

== Results ==
=== Men's Sprint Race – Final ===
Rank	Athlete	RUN 1	T1	Bike	T2	Run 2	Time	Gap
1st place, gold medalist(s)	Mohamed Nemsi (MAR)	15:22.6 (1)	0:31.1	33:01.2 (5)	0:31.4	7:58.2 (3)	57:24.7	–
2nd place, silver medalist(s)	Enes Kızılcık (TUR)	15:59.4 (5)	0:28.2	33:04.9 (7,-3)	0:31.0	7:48.5 (1,+6)	57:52.3	+27.6
3rd place, bronze medalist(s)	Gültigin Er (TUR)	15:58.6 (2)	0:29.9	33:04.0 (6,-1)	0:30.2	7:53.6 (2,+4)	57:56.6	+31.9
4	Meysam Rezaei Layeh (IRI)	16:13.3 (11)	0:26.6	32:26.2 (2,+7)	0:31.0	8:26.9 (9,-2)	58:04.2	+39.5
5	Mohammadamin Sadr-Amin (IRI)	16:00.1 (7)	0:27.6	33:01.2 (4)	0:29.3	8:15.9 (5)	58:14.3	+49.6
6	Abdulrahman Alghamdi (KSA)	15:59.0 (3)	0:25.4	32:59.2 (3,-2)	0:29.6	8:24.5 (7,-2)	58:17.9	+53.2
7	Eloi Komla Djiedjom Adjavon (TOG)	15:59.5 (6)	0:27.3	33:05.3 (8,-3)	0:30.5	8:26.0 (8,-1)	58:28.9	+1:04.2
8	Aleksandr Kurishov (UZB)	15:59.1 (4)	0:26.3	33:06.6 (9,-3)	0:33.4	8:31.1 (10,+1)	58:36.7	+1:12.0
9	Oussama Hellal Berrouane (ALG)	16:30.8 (13)	0:27.9	32:07.3 (1,+10)	0:33.0	9:25.3 (14,-6)	59:04.4	+1:39.7
10	Farid Hadipour (IRI)	16:08.2 (10)	0:26.4	35:47.4 (13,-2)	0:30.4	8:09.0 (4)	1:01:01.7	+3:37.0
11	Omar Ali (BHR)	16:05.1 (9)	0:42.7	35:35.1 (12,-1)	0:31.3	8:16.1 (6)	1:01:10.4	+3:45.7
12	Ehab Khallouf Darkalt (SYR)	16:00.8 (8)	0:28.4	35:52.3 (14,-2)	0:33.9	8:31.7 (11)	1:01:27.4	+4:02.7
13	Toghrul Mammadli (AZE)	16:31.0 (14)	0:31.9	35:20.5 (10,+1)	0:33.6	8:41.1 (12)	1:01:38.4	+4:13.7
14	Rabir Adel (ALG)	16:31.8 (15)	0:30.6	35:21.8 (11,-1)	0:33.4	9:01.7 (13)	1:01:59.5	+4:34.8
15	Abdulaziz Alhowaidi (KUW)	18:13.3 (17)	0:36.6	36:43.0 (15,+2)	0:38.0	9:37.2 (15)	1:05:48.3	+8:23.6
16	Artem Khanadeev (KGZ)	17:49.1 (16)	0:32.1	38:11.8 (16)	0:38.3	10:27.2 (16)	1:07:38.6	+10:13.9
—	Khaleifa Alnuaimi (UAE)	16:30.7 (12)	0:34.9	Disqualified				DSQ

=== Women's Sprint Race – Final ===
Pl.	Athlete	Run 1	T1	Bike	T2	Run 2	Time	Gap
1	Xisca Tous (TUR)	17:13.9 (1)	0:33.6	37:33.2 (1,+1)	0:29.4	8:36.7 (1)	1:04:27.1	–
2	Alina Khakimova (UZB)	17:14.0 (2)	0:30.9	37:36.6 (2,-1)	0:33.5	8:50.6 (2)	1:04:45.9	+18.8
3	Ghizlane Assou (MAR)	18:27.9 (3)	0:29.1	38:45.7 (4)	0:33.1	9:26.7 (3)	1:07:42.8	+3:15.7
4	Dilara Kara (TUR)	18:28.2 (4)	0:37.4	39:20.5 (5)	0:32.2	10:14.7 (6)	1:09:13.3	+4:46.2
5	Imene Maldji (ALG)	19:18.8 (5)	0:32.8	39:29.2 (6)	0:30.1	9:48.9 (4,+1)	1:09:40.0	+5:12.9
6	Hadis Nasr Azadani (IRI)	19:18.9 (6)	0:29.2	39:29.4 (7)	0:33.0	10:01.8 (5,-1)	1:09:52.6	+5:25.5
7	Faezeh Sadat Abedini Nezhad (IRI)	19:54.5 (7)	0:28.7	40:01.7 (9)	0:36.3	10:27.9 (7)	1:11:29.4	+7:02.3
8	Reyhane Khatooni Daryan (IRI)	22:03.0 (13)	0:33.6	37:50.4 (3,+5)	0:36.9	11:25.3 (11)	1:12:29.5	+8:02.4
9	Angelina Blindul (KGZ)	21:11.9 (9)	0:32.9	40:04.5 (10,-1)	0:31.4	11:19.1 (10)	1:13:40.0	+9:12.9
10	Leyla Abdulazizova (AZE)	21:19.8 (10)	0:34.1	39:56.5 (8,-1)	0:37.1	11:40.7 (12)	1:14:08.4	+9:41.3
11	Roaya Alsaati (BHR)	20:54.7 (8)	1:17.8	42:58.1 (12,-1)	1:11.0	10:40.7 (8,+1)	1:17:02.4	+12:35.3
12	Karmah Al-Jaroudy (KSA)	21:24.8 (12)	0:49.9	42:51.8 (11,+1)	0:55.6	11:18.6 (9,-1)	1:17:20.9	+12:53.8
13	Alya Al-Hamad (QAT)	21:24.7 (11)	0:37.7	46:04.1 (13,-3)	0:38.7	11:46.0 (13)	1:20:31.4	+16:04.3
