= Gültigin Er =

Turkish triathlete (born 1997)

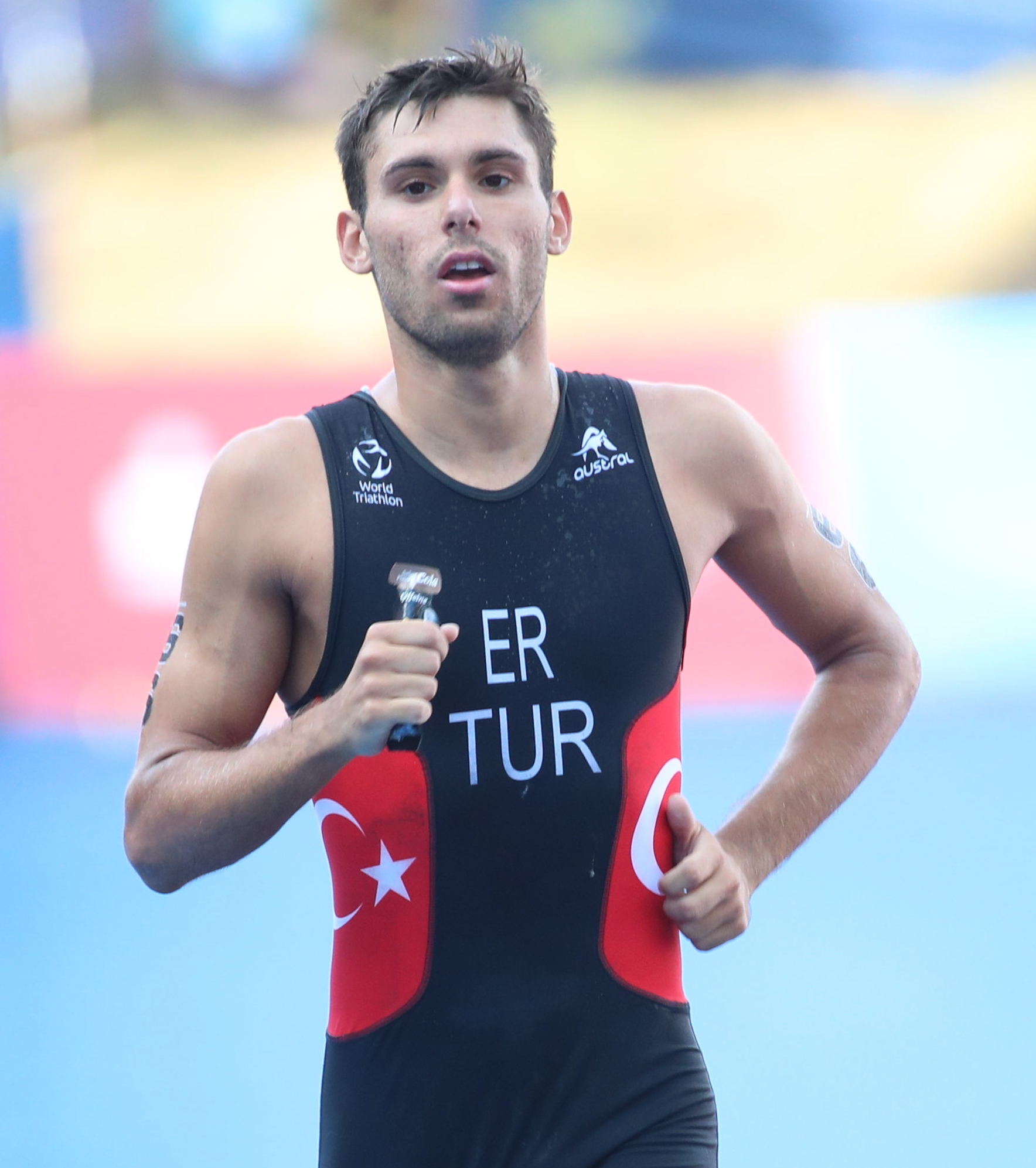

Personal information
- Nationality: Turkish
- Born: 24 October 1997 (age 28)

Sport
- Sport: Triathlon
Medal record
Men's Triathlon
Representing Turkey
Islamic Solidarity Games
Bronze medal – third place	2025 Riyadh	Sprint Race
Balkan Championships
Bronze medal – third place	2025 Mudanya	Triathlon
Tournaments
Silver medal – second place	2025 Oran	Triathlon

Gültigin Er (born 24 October 1997) is a Turkish triathlete.

== Sport career ==
Er is a member of Göztepe S.K. in İzmir.

He competed at the 2018 Mediterranean Games in Tarragona, Spain, where he placed 16th.

He took part at the 2023 European Games in Kraków , Poland, achieving no success.

He competed at the 2025 European Triathlon Championships in Istanbul, Turkey, without success.

At the 2025 Africa Triathlon Cup Oran in Algeria, he won the silver medal.

He took the bronze medal at the 2025 Europe Triathlon Balkan Championships in Mudanya, Bursa, Turkey.

He competed at the 2025 Islamic Solidarity Games in Riyadh, Saudi Arabia, and won the bronze medal in the Sprint race of Duuathlon.

== Personal life ==
Gültigin Er was born on 24 October 1997.

He stadied Business Administration at Yaşar University in İzmir.
