= Mirnes (given name) =

Male given name

- Gender: Male

Other gender
- Feminine: Mirnesa

Other names
- Variant forms: Irnes, Ernes, Arnes
- Related names: Enes

Mirnes is a male given name.

In the Balkans, Mirnes is popular among Bosniaks in the former Yugoslav nations. The name's origins can be linked back to another popular name among Bosniaks, Enes/Anes, which is a name that has been modified, from Enes/Anes to Ernes/Arnes to Irnes/Mirnes. The word "mir" means peace in Bosnian-Croatian-Serbian. This region also has a female equivalent to the name: Mirnesa (for example, Mirnesa Bećirović).

The name is also a popular Arabic name meaning "one with divine wisdom".

== Given name ==
- Mirnes Becirovic (born 1989), Bosnian footballer
- Mirnes Mešić (born 1978), Bosnian footballer
- Mirnes Pepić (born 1995), Montenegrin footballer
- Mirnes Šišić (born 1981), Slovenian footballer
