= Enis =

Male given name

- Gender: Male

Other gender
- Feminine: Enisa

Origin
- Meaning: Genial, close friend

Other names
- Variant form: Anis

Enis is a male given name.

In the Balkans, Enis is popular among Bosniaks in the former Yugoslav nations. It is also popular among Albanians. The name is a modification to the name Anis, and it holds the same meanings of "genial" and "close friend."

The female equivalent to Enis is Enisa (for example, Enisa Nikaj).

== Given name ==
- Enis Akaygen (1881–1956), Turkish diplomat and politician
- Enis Alushi (born 1985), German footballer
- Enis Arıkan (born 1983), Turkish actor
- Enis Bešlagić (born 1975), Bosnian actor
- Enis Batur (born 1952), Turkish poet
- Enis Esmer (born 1978), Canadian actor
- Enis Hajri (born 1983), Tunisian footballer
- Enis Berberoğlu (born 1956), Turkish Politician

== See also ==
- Enis (surname)
