= Enos (surname) =

Enos is a surname, and may refer to:

- Benjamin Enos (1788–1868), New York politician
- Brian Enos, American sport shooter
- Chris Enos (born 1944), American photographer
- Dan Enos (born 1968), American football player and coach
- Ed Enos (1934–2007), Canadian football player and university athletics administrator
- Elihu Enos (1824–1892), American educator and politician from Wisconsin
- James L. Enos (1825–1903), American teacher and newspaper publisher in Iowa
- John Enos III (born 1962), American actor
- Joseph Kweku Enos (1941–2024), Ghanaian politician
- Mike Enos (born 1963), American professional wrestler
- Mireille Enos (born 1975), American actress
- Randall Enos (born 1936), American illustrator and cartoonist
- Richard Enos, American rhetorician
- Roger Enos (1729–1808), military leader in Vermont
- Solomon Enos, Hawaiian artist, illustrator and activist
- Stacey Enos (born 1964), American soccer player
- Truman Enos (1777–1858), New York politician
- Wes Enos, American politician

== See also ==
- Eno (surname)
- Enis (surname)
