= Bence Bicsák =

Hungarian triathlete

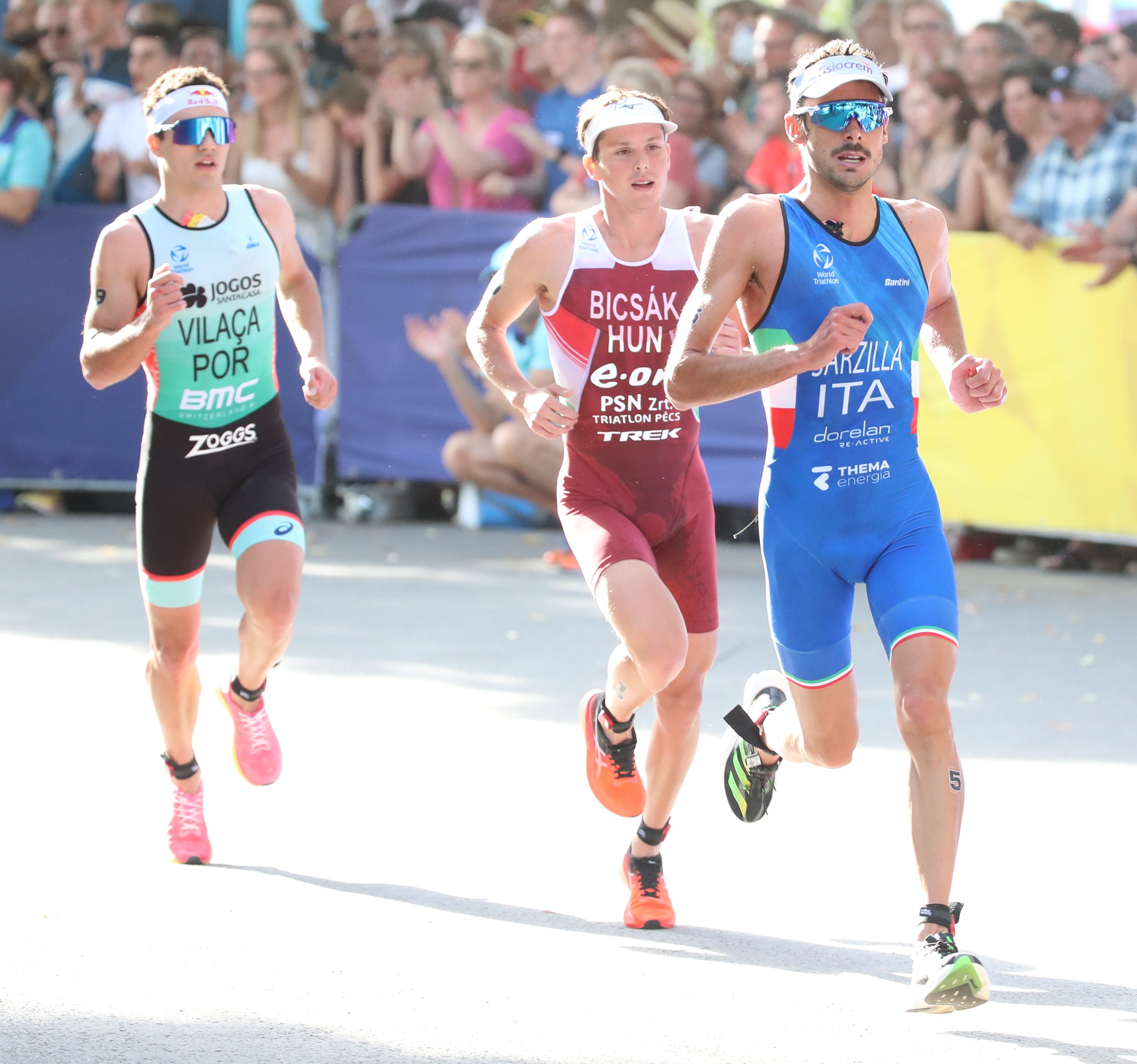
- Bicsák (center) in 2022

Personal information
- Nickname: Bicsu
- National team: Hungary
- Born: 19 October 1995 (age 31)
- Education: Pécsi Tudományegyetem, Zalaegerszegi Zrínyi Miklós Gimnázium, University of Pécs
- Height: 1.73 m (5 ft 8 in)

Sport
- Sport: Triathlon
- Events: Olympic distance, sprint distance
- League: World Triathlon Championship Series, World Triathlon Cup
- Club: PSN zrt. (Hungary), JFTcrew Elite Squad, Triathlon Toulouse Metropole (France)
- Team: Hungarian Olympic Team (2020 and 2024)
- Turned pro: 2017
- Coached by: Joel Filliol, Drew Box (Olympic cycle 2024), Szilárd Tóth (Olympic cycle 2020)
Medal record
Men's triathlon
Representing Hungary
European Championships
| Silver medal – second place | 2025 Istanbul | Individual |
- Updated on 15 July 2024

Bence Bicsák (born 19 October 1995) is a Hungarian professional triathlete and double Olympian. He was a member of the Hungarian 2020 Olympic Triathlon team and competed in the men's individual event at the 2020 Tokyo Olympic Summer Games where placed 7th, the highest placing Olympic triathlon finish by a Hungarian. He was also selected to compete in the men's individual event at the 2024 Summer Olympics in Paris, where he finished in 16th place out of 55 Olympians who started the race. Additionally, at the 2020 Tokyo Olympics, Bicsák competed in the inaugural Triathlon - Mixed-Relay event. The Hungarian team composed of two men and two women finished in 11th position.

Bicsák competes within the top-tier World Triathlon Championship Series (WTCS) and also at numerous World Triathlon Cups. As of 22 July 2024, World Triathlon reports that Bence Bicsák had 98 Starts, 21 Podium finishes, and 11 Wins.

Before 2023, no Hungarian triathlete had ever been ranked higher than Bence Bicsák by World Triathlon. Csongor Lehmann obtained a higher ranking by the end of 2023.

Since 2014, Bicsák's race results have brought him much national attention. As a triathlete, he has been a member of the PSN zrt (Pécsi Sport Nonprofit) triathlon team since 2015. The PSN zrt team is based in the city of Pécs where Bence Bicsák resided until 2022 and where he completed his university degree. He graduated with a Major in Business Administration and Management from the university of Pécs, (Pécsi Tudományegyetem).

Prior to July 2022, Bicsák routinely trained with and competed against fellow Hungarian team member Faldum Gábor. Faldum was an Olympic triathlete at the 2016 Rio de Janeiro Olympic Games. Prior to July 2022, as part of the Hungarian National team, Bicsák attended foreign training camps where he trained and competed with 2016 and 2020 Olympic triathlete Támas Tóth.

== Childhood and early life ==
Bence Bicsák was an active child who loved to play outside and enjoyed hobbies and new sports. Running, swimming, cycling, soccer, basketball were some of the sports that gave him pleasure. When he was around 7 or 8 years old, he practiced swimming a few times per week. He did not enjoy it much, was not successful in competitions, but his parents persuaded him to continue. In the meantime, he continued with other sports.

When he was around 11 or 12 years old, his parents, who ran as a hobby, took the young Bence Bicsák to a race. The race gave him enjoyment.

A local coach, István Góczán, of the Triathlon Association in Zalaegerszeg contacted Bicsák and asked him to participate in an aquathlon competition. Aquathlon is a race combining swimming and running. Bence did well in the swim and ran his way up to finish first. To his surprise, Bence had earned a gold medal. He had never won a running race before. The race was the spark that set him on an exceptionally long and challenging path to eventually becoming a top-10 triathlete. When he was 15 years old, Bicsák decided to take up the sport of triathlon. At some point, István Góczán asked the young Bence Bicsák at what age he wanted to reach his top performance level, physically and mentally. Bence Bicsák's answer was "between 25 and 28".

== Personal life ==
Bicsák has a younger sister, Flora, who competed for many years in the sports of triathlon, duathlon, and athletics. In their teens, Bence and Flora would often train together. Flora competed in the 2014 Nanjing Youth Olympic Games.

Bence Bicsák's parents are both medical doctors, and as a hobby they practiced the sport of half-marathon for numerous years.

== Career ==
=== 2012-2011: Learning, training and progressing ===
In the years 2011 and 2012, Bence Bicsák competed in six European Triathlon Union events. In half the events, he placed in the top 10.

On 1 September 2012, in Aguilas, Spain, he and his Hungarian teammates won a silver medal at the ETU Triathlon U23 and Youth European Championships Youth Relay.

Bicsák was a member of the Triathlon Club of Zalaegerszeg and trained with the Mogyi SE Baja-Pécs team (now known as Mogyi SE Baja team) during the summer of 2012.

=== 2013: First Hungarian to qualify for the World Championships ===
In 2013, Bicsák competed in 6 triathlon events. He won one Gold. Overall, in 25% of the events, he placed within the top 10.

On 15 June at the 2013 Triathlon European Championships in Alanya, Turkey, Bence Bicsák placed an unexpected 10th place in the Junior Men category.

He became the first Hungarian to qualify for the World Championships. The experience gained by Bicsák at the Grand Final event in London, was significant. Jacob Birtwhistle, Tyler Mislawchuk, and Kristian Blummenfelt who would each hold a top-10 Olympic Qualification ranking in 2020 and 2021 were also present at the Grand Final.

Despite his Junior age, on 21 July 2013, he competed for the first time in the Elite Men category during the 2013 Tartu ITU Sprint Triathlon European Cup. He placed 21st out of 47 competitors. Bence Bicsák time was 00:57:28, Kristian Blummenfelt of Norway came in first with a time of 00:55:36.

In 2013, he placed first at the Hungarian Triathlon Junior National Championships, he also won a gold medal in the Hungarian National Duathlon Championship.

For 2013, Bence Bicsák had designed his training plan. His father, who had previously competed in the half-marathon sport, also provided some assistance. The young athlete's training regiment was; training once or twice per day, swimming six times per week, cycling three times per week or more during spring and summer, and running four or five times per week. The overall training was; 14 to 15 training sessions in the winter and between 16 and 18 in the summer.

As a member of the Triathlon Club of Zalaegerszeg, Bence Bicsák received coaching assistance from; Csaba Horváth and Tamás Horváth for swimming, István Góczán for running, Tamás Binder and Miklós Déri for cycling.

During the summer of 2013, he also trained with the team of Mogyi SE Baja-Pécs.

=== 2014: Numerous successes. Heads off to university ===
For 2014, the World Triathlon rankings database indicates that Bence Bicsák competed in 8 triathlon events. He won three Golds and one Bronze. Overall, in 75% of the events, he placed within the top 10.

In 2014, as a Junior he finished 12th in the World Triathlon Grand Final in Edmonton, and also as a Junior he finished 5th at the Kitzbühel ETU Triathlon European Championships. As a Junior, he also won two European Cups, one in Tiszaujvaros, and another in Holten.

In 2014, and for the second year in a row, Bence Bicsák won a gold medal in Hungary's National Sprint Distance Duathlon Championship. During the same year, his younger sister, Flora Bicsák, also won a gold medal at the National Duathlon Championships of Hungary. Beating 542 other competitors, Flora Bicsák also won a silver medal at the 2014 National Cross Country Championships. Both siblings, Bence and Flora, often trained together for triathlons. Their athletic success in 2014 yielded national media attention.

In June 2014, Bence Bicsák graduated from the Zalaegerszegi Zrínyi Miklós Gimnázium (High school). Dr. Lajos Bicsák, the athlete's dad, graduated from the same school in 1983. His younger sister Flora would also graduate from the same school in 2016.

In January 2014. Bence Bicsák signed on as a triathlete of the Mogyi SE Baja-Pécs team.

In 2014, Bence Bicsák got accepted into the Faculty of Business and Economics at the University of Pécs. Many decades earlier, both of his parents had graduated from a university of Pécs. He moved from Zalaegerszeg to the city of Pécs. In 2014 began training as a triathlete for PSN zrt.

=== 2015: Bicsák’s development draws much attention ===
In 2015, PSN Zrt Sportiskola (PSN Ltd. Sports School in Pécs) established a new triathlon department led by Toth Szilard. As department head and coach, Szilárd and many of his dedicated staff members provided Bence Bicsák and nearly forty other Hungarian triathletes with excellent training conditions and significant support. PSN zrt. has 14 sports departments, and significant sports facilities.

2015 was the first year that Bence Bicsák competed as an adult and within the U23 (Under 23 years old) triathlon category. He also began racing the Olympic distance (1.5 km swim, 40 km bike, and 10 km run), a race format twice as long as most of his previous races. For Bicsák, the significantly greater triathlon distances coupled with a much higher level of competition resulted in a much more challenging year.

For 2015, the World Triathlon rankings database indicates that Bence Bicsák competed in 11 triathlon events and had three podium finishes, two Silvers and one Bronze. Overall, he placed within the top 10 in 73% of the events.

Bicsák failed to qualify for the 2015 World Cup Final but reportedly learned a lot from the negative experience. In Hungary, Bicsák's development continued to draw much attention. His training sessions were between 5 and 6 hours per day.

=== 2016: Breakthrough performance. Places 3rd in Cozumel Grand Final ===
For 2016, the World Triathlon rankings database indicates that Bence Bicsák competed in 12 triathlon events and had two Bronze finishes. Overall, he placed within the top 10 in 58% of the events. In 2016, Bence Bicsák competed in Olympic distance triathlon race events within the adult category. The motivation and experience gained by racing against ex-Olympians and potential future Olympians helped Bicsák advance significantly.

In 2016, while being a university student, Bicsák's typical weekly training regimen consisted of two intense, three mid-length, and one challenging long-distance run. The preceding was coupled with daily swims and bicycling three times per week.

In 2016, the Hungarian Triathlon Union awarded the then 20-year-old Bence Bicsák for being the best U23 athlete in 2015.

Bicsák and fellow triathlete and Pécs teammate Noémi Sárszegi qualified for the 2020 Tokyo Olympic training program. The 2020 Olympic training program began after the 2016 Rio Olympic Games. It provided specialized training camps and competitions to help develop potential Hungarian Olympians. A key objective for Bicsák was preparation by 2018 for the two-year Olympic qualification process for the 2020 Games. During the two-year qualification process, over many races, triathletes accumulate points. The top 55 males and 55 females with the highest points rankings become qualified for the Games.

In 2016, races that are not ITU (International Triathlon Union) events provided Bicsák with additional opportunities to compete, enjoy the sport and improve. In May 2016, Bence Bicsák with his coach Szilárd Tóth and kayaker Vilmos Fodróczi as teammates won the Middle Distance Quadrathlon Championship. Similarly, later in May, and despite having raced for four consecutive weekends, Bicsák won Gold for the third year in a row in Tiszaújváros Sprint Distance triathlon. In September, he won gold in Slovenia with approximately a 2-minute lead.

In June 2016, and despite fighting a viral infection, Bicsák finished 8th at the U23 Triathlon European Championships in Bulgaria, which earned him the qualification rights for the important U23 World triathlon Championships in Mexico.

Described as his breakthrough by World Triathlon, on 7 September 2016, Bence Bicsák earned a Bronze at the 2016 ITU World Triathlon Grand Final Cozumel U23. The podium finish at the Grand Final was against many competitors that held Olympic caliber places in the rankings. His Bronze was remarkable in that he ranked 33rd before the start of the race. After the race, and in the Adult category, Bicsák held the 138th position, a substantial leap from the 360th position he occupied at the beginning of the same year. The Grand Final Bronze was pivotal in the triathlete's career.

=== 2017: Wins his first World Triathlon Cup ===
For 2017, the World Triathlon rankings database indicates that Bence Bicsák competed in 11 triathlon events and won gold in four of them. Overall, he placed within the top 10 in 73% of the events. 2017 was a highly successful year for Bicsák. He would earn his first Triathlon World Cup in Tiszaújváros.

In recognition of his excellent results and progress in 2016, in January 2017, Bence Bicsák was awarded by the Hungarian Triathlon Foundation for the second time. The Foundation awarded Bicsák the first award in 2014. As a beneficiary of the Hungarian 2020 Olympic training program, at the start of 2017, Bence Bicsák attended a training camp in the Canary Islands. Among the other training activities, and compared to Hungary's climate in the winter, the more favorable environment in the Canary Islands made it possible for Bicsák to bicycle 800 kilometers in two weeks.

After participating in a two-week training camp in Cyprus on 26 March 2017, Bence Bicsák placed 4th at the 2017 Gran Canaria ETU Triathlon European Cup Elite event. There was much chaos in the swim portion of the race. He exited the water 12th, reached the breakaway bike group in the first 10 km of the bike segment, and powered during his run to a 4th-place finish for his first competition of 2017.

On 22 April 2017, Bence Bicsák finished won gold at the Hungarian Sprint Duathlon National Championships held in Balatonboglar.

On 4 June 2017, Bence Bicsák finished 9th in the Cagliari ITU Triathlon World Cup Elite event. The event marked the second time that Bicsák finished in the top ten in a World Cup, and as a result, he ranked 66th place in the world ranking.

On 22 July 2017, Bence Bicsák wins his first World Triathlon Cup at the 2017 Tiszaújváros ITU Triathlon World Cup Elite event. Bicsák won Gold by arriving at the finish line 15 seconds before the three-time Olympian Dmitry Polyanski and thus earning for Hungary the second-ever gold medal in a Triathlon World Cup. Ákos Vanek is the only other Hungarian triathlete to ever win a World Triathlon Cup. Two weeks before the World Cup event, Bicsák finished 7th at the European Athletics U23 Championships. Additionally, Bicsák finished 3rd in the 10,000-meter Adult National Championships.

On 5 August 2017, Bence Bicsák won gold at the Velence ETU Triathlon U23 European Championships event. After the European Championship event, Bicsák held 47th place in the world rankings.

=== 2018: Competing at world-level ===
For 2018, the World Triathlon rankings database indicates that Bence Bicsák competed in 13 triathlon events and won two Golds and a Bronze. Overall, he placed within the top 10 in 62% of the races. In 2018, he competed in Asia, Canada, Australia, Europe, and the Middle East.

In 2018, the Hungarian Triathlon Union awarded the then 22-year-old Bence Bicsák for being the best U23 triathlon and duathlon athlete in 2017. Bence Bicsák's coach, Szilárd Tóth, was acknowledged as Coach of the Year in the same ceremony.

On 12 May 2018, at the ITU World Triathlon Series (WTS) Yokohama Elite event, Bence Bicsák finished 5th. The WTS is where the best in the world compete; this Bicsák's second participation in the WTS. After the race, the then two-time World Champion and two-time Olympian Mario Mola shook Bicsák's hand to acknowledge Bicsák notable accomplishment. The Yokohama WTS was the first of forty triathlon Olympic Qualification events for the 2020 Games. The top 12 results determine the Olympic Qualification rankings. ITU Triathlon World Cup events have a maximum of 75 competitors. However, ITU Triathlon World Series (WTS) has only 55 competitors, and many top-10 in the rankings tend to be present.

On 21 May 2018, after two events, Bence Bicsák was 1st in the ITU Individual Olympic Qualification Ranking. After the Lausanne ITU Triathlon World Cup where he finished 4th, on 18 August 2018, Bence Bicsák was 7th in the ITU Individual Olympic Qualification Ranking. A week later, after the ITU World Triathlon Montreal Elite event, he ranked 6th.

On 14 September 2018, at the ITU World Triathlon Grand Final Gold Coast U23 event, Bence Bicsák won Bronze sharing the podium with Tayler Reid and Samuel Dickenson.

Reflecting on the 2018 triathlon competition year, Bence Bicsák stated, "These results are noteworthy because no Hungarian triathlete has made (it) to the top 10 so far, and this was only my first year to race in world-level competitions."

At the end of 2018, his first year competing in the top-tier World Triathlon Series (WTS), Bence Bicsák ranked 23rd.

=== 2019 ===
For 2019, the World Triathlon rankings database indicates that Bence Bicsák competed in 11 triathlon events and won two Bronze. Overall, he placed within the top 10 in 64% of the races.

On 27 April 2019, at the MS Amlin World Triathlon Bermuda Elite event, Bicsák finished 7th. His race result propelled him to 11th place in the World Triathlon Series Rankings, overtaking a two-time Olympian in the process. Post-race, Bicsák's performance captured the attention of the then five-time world champion triathlete legend.

On 18 May 2019, at the ITU World Triathlon Yokohama Elite event, Bicsák finished 3rd. Bicsák overtook the five-time world champion and Olympic Silver medalist Javier Gomez by 12 seconds to earn the Bronze. Furthermore, Bicsák shared the podium with the #1 ranked triathlete Vincent Luis and Olympic medalist Henri Schoeman. The result of the race placed Bicsák at 6th place in the Olympic Qualification rankings and 12th in the World rankings.

On 27 May 2019, Richárd László, Director of Toyota Central Europe, distributed a Toyota C-HR hybrid to Bence Bicsák and twelve other sponsored Olympic caliber athletes. Toyota was a Platinum Sponsor of the Hungarian Olympic Committee and also directly sponsored athletes like Bicsák. Krisztián Kulcsár, President of the Hungarian Olympic Committee, was present at the distribution ceremony.

On 6 July 2019, there was a multiple cyclist crash during the Hamburg Wasser World Triathlon Elite event. Due to crashes in front of him,he violently came into contact with a metal crowd barrier at fast speed. He was ejected into the air as his bicycle came to a sudden and complete stop. As a result, an injured Bence Bicsák needed transportation to a hospital.

Unfortunately, the accident in Hamburg made it impossible for him and the Hungarian team to compete in the Triathlon team-relay race on the following day. Fortunately, there were no fractures or significant tears. Before the race in Hamburg, Bicsák had finished top-10 in all but one WTS event. After Hamburg, Bicsák was 16th in the World Rankings, 9th in the WTS rankings, and 10th in the Olympic Qualification rankings. Because of his injuries, Bicsák training regimen needed adjustment, but he was hopeful regarding the remaining triathlon competition season.

On 16 August 2019, the important Tokyo ITU World Triathlon Olympic Qualification event took place. The event was simultaneously a test of the 2020 Olympic venue and a triathlon Olympic Qualification event.

The Tokyo event occurred only 41 days after Bicsák's significant crash and injury in Hamburg. After a challenging swim, Bicsák caught up to the lead peloton but was involved in a mass bike crash. He recovered from the crash and, due to his remarkable running performance, managed to finish 7th. Bicsák would later state that "… only a podium finish would have made me happy! It would have been more realistic to just give up at that point considering the mental state I was in." Two days later, the Hungarian mixed-relay team, of which Bicsák is a member, finished 9th. Despite the physical injuries sustained in Hamburg 41 days prior,Bence Bicsák secured his top-10 Olympic Qualification ranking.

On 7 September 2019, at the Banyoles ITU Triathlon World Cup event, Bicsák closed the triathlon racing season by finishing 3rd. Bicsák's comeback performance in Banyoles was as "astonishing." Bicsák was 17 seconds away from the Silver obtained by the 5 -time World Champing Mario Mola and 19 seconds away from the Gold won by then-current World Champion Vincent Luis.

On 17 October 2019, Bence Bicsák was credited as providing Hungarian triathlon with increased momentum due to his numerous top-10 finishes in the top-tier World Triathlon Series (WTS).

2019 was Bence Bicsák's most challenging year of his life. There were high expectations and a great deal of pressure on the 23-year-old athlete. After the 2019 Yokohama event that had propelled him to 4th in the rankings, he stated, "I suddenly felt as though I was capable of anything." However, later, in the Hamburg WTS event, he went from the best shape of his life to a race-canceling injury. To his credit, by the year-end, Bicsák found the physical and mental fortitude to end on a triumph, albeit a painful one.

On 30 December 2019, the International Triathlon Union (ITU) officially ranked Bence Bicsák as having the #9 position in the Individual Olympic Qualification Ranking for the 2020 Tokyo Games.

=== 2020 ===
At the beginning of 2020, Bicsák's 5784.78 points, 9th in the World Triathlon Individual Olympic Qualification rankings made him technically assured of qualifying for the 2020 Tokyo Olympics. However, Bicsák expressed that all athletes who make it to the Olympic games stand a medal chance regardless of how high their Olympic Qualification ranking is.

On 15 January 2020, a ceremony confirmed the establishment of a sponsorship agreement between the Hungarian Triathlon Union and global corporate giant E.ON. During the same ceremony, in recognition of Bence Bicsák's unprecedented triathlon results, E.ON announced that Bicsák was sponsored, and expected to have a top-10 finish at the Tokyo Olympic Games. Bicsák stated, "My primary goal is to become the world's best triathlete.". Historically, the best Hungarian result in an Olympics was 30th by Csaba Kuttor at the 2000 Sydney Olympic Games.

The World Health Organization (WHO) declared COVID-19 as a pandemic on 11 March 2020. Bicsák had been training "like crazy," intending to reach his peak performance at the 2020 Olympics. However, COVID-19 restrictions closed or severely limited access to the training venues essential to keeping an elite athlete at their best performance level.

Due to not knowing when the international competition season could begin, elite triathletes competed primarily domestically when they could, at amateur events, and under COVID-19 restrictions. Bicsák's first such event was the eXtremeMan 2020 amateur event near Kaposvár. The Olympic distance event was Bicsák's first race in ten months. He came in first beating in the process two of his fellow National Team members. However, Bicsák's goal was not to defeat his competitors but to "promote each other's training" and determine his mental state.

On 5 September 2020, at the Hamburg Wasser World Triathlon Elite event, Bence Bicsák finished 14th. He was "somewhat frustrated." With regards to the event, Bicsák stated what follows. "The race in Hamburg was a significant one not only in terms of the coming year but also my career as a whole because this is the only means to achieve mental training." "This was the kind of racing that I missed. It is entirely different to cycle in a peloton of 60 bikers versus 4 or 5, like it was the case at home."

On 5 September 2020, at the Hamburg ITU Triathlon Mixed Relay World Championships event, the Hungarian team that Bicsák was a member of finished 12th.

On 13 September 2020, at the Karlovy Vary ITU Triathlon World Cup Elite event and recovering from a minor hit by a motorcycle cameraperson, Bence Bicsák finished 5th. Unfortunately for Bicsák, the motorcycle made a turn while Bicsák was attempting to pass. Bicsák was slightly hurt, but "quite a few contestants" passed him when he stopped to go around the motorcycle. In 2020, this was the only World Cup where Bicsák could compete.

=== 2021: Tokyo Olympics during COVID-19 ===
At the start of 2021, the COVID pandemic continued to disrupt significantly the competition schedule set by World Triathlon. Uncertainty of the first WTCS race in Chengdu, the moving of the Montreal event and Adu Dhabi even t dates made travel and logistics planning a challenge.

In a parallel triathlon competition series, the pandemic also played havoc with the 2021 Triathlon World Cup schedule. The cancelation of the 2021 Osaka Triathlon World Cup and the changed date of the Huatulco Triathlon World Cup signaled that the 2021 World Cup season might continue to have significant disruptions.

Due to COVID-19, the pre-Olympic 2021 triathlon season was exceptionally challenging for many elite triathletes trying to regain their peak performance. In four out of five 2021 pre-Olympic game events, Bence Bicsák finished well below his typical performance levels. However, on 13 June 2021, Bence Bicsák achieved a gold medal finish at the Grand-Prix triathlon event in Dunkirk.

As a member of the Hungarian 2020 Olympic Triathlon team, Bence Bicsák competed in the men's individual event at the 2020 Tokyo Olympic Summer Games. He placed 7th out of 51 Olympians that started the race. Prior to Bence Bicsák's 7th-place finish at the Tokyo Olympics, Hungary's best triathlon Olympic finish to date was from Csaba Kuttor who finished 30th at the 2000 Sydney Olympic games.

In July 2022, "in consultation with his coach, Szilárd Tóth, and the management of PSN Zrt, "Bence Bicsák accepted an invitation to join the JFTcrew Elite Squad, with Joel Filliol as the lead coach. Joel Filliol (Canadian) "is widely regarded as one of the best", having "worked with a number of national federations in various positions." Szilárd Tóth was Bicsák's primary coach until July 2022.

=== 2024: Paris Olympics ===
Font-Romeu's high-altitude training camp in the French Pyrenees is at 1,850 meters and is within 190 km of Girona. Since joining JFTcrew, much training has occurred there. In June 2024, in preparation for the Paris Olympics, Bence Bicsák stated that he would spend about five weeks at a high-altitude training camp.

There were high expectations from the Hungarian Triathlon Association for the Paris Olympics. In the context of Bence's Bicsak's 7th-place finish at the Tokyo Olympics, Zsanett Kuttor-Bragmayer's 12th-place finish, and the upcoming first-time presence of Csongor Lehmann at an Olympic event, Gábor Kindl, president of the Hungarian Triathlon Association, stated, "If everything comes together, the team may even bring home a medal. It would be a huge success."

== Rankings ==
Prior to the 2024 Summer Olympics in Paris, on 15 July 2024, the rankings of Bence Bicsák were;

- World Triathlon Individual Olympic Qualification Ranking 29
- World Ranking 35
- World Triathlon Championship Series Ranking 58
- Continental Ranking 21
- 98 Starts, 21 Podiums, 11 Wins

Post 2020 Summer Olympics triathlon competitions in Tokyo (held in 2021), on 28 July 2021, the rankings of Bence Bicsák were;

- 2020 Tokyo Olympics Triathlon Men's individual event 7th
- World Ranking 21
- World Triathlon Championship Series Ranking 17th
- Continental Ranking 15th
- 76 Starts, 14 Podiums, 8 Wins

== Endorsements ==
As a top-10 triathlete, Bence Bicsák has been able to obtain sponsorship from significant global corporate entities. The professional video featuring Bence Bicsák in their pre-Olympic Games "For The Moment" campaign illustrated well the marketing attention that Bicsák received.

As of 3 May 2021, Bence Bicsák had the following corporate sponsors; Trek, E.ON, Mizuno, Pécs Brewery, Oakley, Toyota, Garmin and High5.

== Career statistics ==
The following list is based upon the official World Triathlon rankings and the Athletes' Profile Page

Results
| Date | Pos | City | Event | Discipline | Result time |
|---|---|---|---|---|---|
| 2011-07-31 | 17 | Tábor | ETU Triathlon European Cup | Junior Men | 1:01:50 |
| 2011-08-13 | 14 | Tiszaújváros | ETU Triathlon European Cup | Junior Men Semifinal 1 | 0:36:53 |
| 2012-06-16 | 32 | Vienna | ETU Triathlon European Cup | Junior Men | 1:04:02 |
| 2012-07-14 | 4 | Tiszaújváros | ETU Triathlon European Cup | Junior Men Semifinal 1 | 0:35:42 |
| 2012-07-14 | DNF | Tiszaújváros | ETU Triathlon European Cup | Junior Men | 0:00:00 |
| 2012-09-01 | 2 | Aguilas | ETU Triathlon European Championship | Youth Men Relay | 0:27:18 |
| 2012-09-02 | 6 | Aguilas | ETU Triathlon European Cup | Junior Men | 0:59:51 |
| 2012-09-08 | 10 | Bled | ETU Triathlon European Cup | Junior Men | 0:38:53 |
| 2013-06-15 | 10 | Alanya | ETU Triathlon European Championship | Junior Men | 0:53:30 |
| 2013-06-16 | NC | Alanya | ETU Triathlon European Championship | Mixed Junior Relay | 0:23:05 |
| 2013-07-21 | 21 | Tartu | ITU Sprint Triathlon European Cup | Elite Men | 0:57:28 |
| 2013-08-03 | 1 | Fadd-Dombori | HUN Triathlon National Championships | Junior Men | 0:53:27 |
| 2013-08-31 | 13 | Eton Dorney | ETU Triathlon European Cup | Junior Men | 0:57:37 |
| 2013-09-12 | 32 | London | ITU World Triathlon Grand Final | Junior Men | 0:53:32 |
| 2014-04-13 | 11 | Quarteira | ETU Triathlon European Cup | Junior Men | 0:58:06 |
| 2014-05-31 | 1 | Keszthely | HUN Triathlon National Championships | Junior Men | 1:01:10 |
| 2014-06-21 | 5 | Kitzbühel | ETU Triathlon European Championship | Junior Men | 0:58:22 |
| 2014-06-22 | 8 | Kitzbühel | ETU Triathlon European Championship | Mixed Junior Relay | 0:24:27 |
| 2014-07-05 | 1 | Holten | ETU Triathlon European Cup | Junior Men | 0:57:35 |
| 2014-07-19 | 3 | Geneva | ETU Triathlon European Cup | Junior Men | 1:01:00 |
| 2014-08-09 | 1 | Tiszaújváros | ETU Triathlon European Cup | Junior Men Semifinal 3 | 0:35:38 |
| 2014-08-10 | 1 | Tiszaújváros | ETU Triathlon European Cup | Junior Men Final | 0:37:35 |
| 2014-08-29 | 12 | Edmonton | ITU World Triathlon Grand Final | Junior Men | 0:57:29 |
| 2015-03-21 | 15 | Quarteira | ETU Triathlon European Cup | Elite Men | 1:51:12 |
| 2015-04-12 | 2 | Horst | ETU Powerman Long Distance and Sprint Duathlon European Championship | U23 Men Sprint Distance | 0:54:23 |
| 2015-04-12 | 6 | Horst | ETU Powerman Long Distance and Sprint Duathlon European Championship | Elite Men Sprint Distance | 0:54:23 |
| 2015-04-26 | 3 | | HUN Sprint Duathlon National Championships | Elite Men | 0:53:06 |
| 2015-06-14 | 40 | Baku | European Games European Games | Elite Men | 1:57:26 |
| 2015-06-20 | 2 | Baja | HUN Sprint Triathlon National Championships | Elite Men | 0:55:36 |
| 2015-07-12 | 6 | Geneva | ETU Triathlon European Championship | Mixed Relay | 0:21:19 |
| 2015-07-25 | 10 | Banyoles | ETU Triathlon European Championship | U23 Men | 1:46:52 |
| 2015-07-26 | 4 | Banyoles | ETU Triathlon European Championship | Mixed U23 Relay | 0:19:56 |
| 2015-08-08 | 17 | Tiszaújváros | ITU Triathlon World Cup | Elite Men Semifinal 1 | 0:57:35 |
| 2015-08-16 | 7 | Eğirdir | ETU Triathlon European Cup | Elite Men | 2:02:20 |
| 2015-09-17 | 27 | Chicago | ITU World Triathlon Grand Final | U23 Men | 1:44:02 |
| 2016-04-02 | DSQ | Quarteira | ETU Triathlon European Cup | Elite Men | DSQ |
| 2016-05-01 | 19 | Madrid | ETU Triathlon European Cup | Elite Men | 1:58:15 |
| 2016-05-08 | 26 | Cagliari | ITU Triathlon World Cup | Elite Men | 0:58:19 |
| 2016-06-18 | 8 | Burgas | ETU Triathlon European Championship | U23 Men | 1:00:20 |
| 2016-06-19 | 4 | Burgas | ETU Triathlon European Championship | Mixed U23 Relay | 0:24:18 |
| 2016-06-25 | 3 | Baja | HUN Sprint Triathlon National Championships | Elite Men | 1:00:54 |
| 2016-07-09 | 8 | Tiszaújváros | ITU Triathlon World Cup | Elite Men Semifinal 2 | 0:55:22 |
| 2016-07-10 | 11 | Tiszaújváros | ITU Triathlon World Cup | Elite Men | 0:55:14 |
| 2016-08-07 | 7 | Nyon | FISU Triathlon World University Championship | Men Team | 1:47:56 |
| 2016-08-07 | 4 | Nyon | FISU Triathlon World University Championship | Elite Men | 1:47:56 |
| 2016-09-15 | 3 | Cozumel | ITU World Triathlon Grand Final | U23 Men | 1:53:02 |
| 2016-09-17 | 13 | Cozumel | ITU World Triathlon Grand Final | Mixed U23-Junior Relay | 0:15:41 |
| 2016-09-25 | 9 | Salinas | ITU Triathlon World Cup | Elite Men | 0:53:55 |
| 2017-03-26 | 4 | Gran Canaria | ETU Triathlon European Cup | Elite Men | 1:51:45 |
| 2017-04-22 | 1 | Balatonboglár | HUN Sprint Duathlon National Championships | Elite Men | 0:52:27 |
| 2017-05-28 | 38 | Madrid | ITU Triathlon World Cup | Elite Men | 1:58:23 |
| 2017-06-04 | 9 | Cagliari | ITU Triathlon World Cup | Elite Men | 0:55:37 |
| 2017-06-17 | 37 | Kitzbühel | ETU Triathlon European Championship | Elite Men | 1:51:30 |
| 2017-06-18 | 9 | Kitzbühel | ETU Triathlon European Championship | Mixed Relay | 0:18:31 |
| 2017-06-25 | 1 | Baja | HUN Sprint Triathlon National Championships | Elite Men | 0:55:39 |
| 2017-07-22 | 1 | Tiszaújváros | ITU Triathlon World Cup | Elite Men Semifinal 1 | 0:53:59 |
| 2017-07-23 | 1 | Tiszaújváros | ITU Triathlon World Cup | Elite Men | 0:54:58 |
| 2017-08-05 | 1 | Velence | ETU Triathlon European Championship | U23 Men | 0:55:54 |
| 2017-08-06 | 5 | Velence | ETU Triathlon European Championship | Mixed U23 Relay | 0:24:23 |
| 2017-09-15 | DNF | Rotterdam | ITU World Triathlon Grand Final | U23 Men | DNF |
| 2018-03-02 | 29 | Abu Dhabi | ITU World Triathlon | Elite Men | 0:59:17 |
| 2018-03-31 | 1 | Sharm El Sheikh | ATU Sprint Triathlon African Cup and Pan Arab Championships | Elite Men | 0:59:48 |
| 2018-05-05 | 1 | Chengdu | ITU Triathlon World Cup | Elite Men Semifinal 1 | 0:53:35 |
| 2018-05-06 | 11 | Chengdu | ITU Triathlon World Cup | Elite Men | 0:28:38 |
| 2018-05-12 | 5 | Yokohama | ITU World Triathlon | Elite Men | 1:46:11 |
| 2018-05-19 | 4 | Astana | ITU Triathlon World Cup | Elite Men | 1:37:39 |
| 2018-06-23 | 1 | Baja | HUN Sprint Triathlon National Championships | Elite Men | 0:55:52 |
| 2018-07-07 | 1 | Tiszaújváros | ITU Triathlon World Cup | Elite Men Semifinal 2 | 0:52:27 |
| 2018-07-08 | DNF | Tiszaújváros | ITU Triathlon World Cup | Elite Men | DNF |
| 2018-07-14 | 18 | Hamburg | ITU World Triathlon | Elite Men | 0:54:08 |
| 2018-07-15 | 13 | Hamburg | ITU Triathlon World Championships | Mixed Relay | 0:19:27 |
| 2018-08-18 | 4 | Lausanne | ITU Triathlon World Cup | Elite Men | 1:50:47 |
| 2018-08-26 | 9 | Montreal | ITUWorld Triathlon | Elite Men | 1:49:28 |
| 2018-09-14 | 3 | Gold Coast | ITU World Triathlon Grand Final | U23 Men | 1:44:31 |
| 2018-09-16 | 9 | Gold Coast | ITU World Triathlon Grand Final | Mixed U23-Junior Relay | 0:19:26 |
| 2019-03-08 | 17 | Daman | ITU World Triathlon | Elite Men | 0:52:35 |
| 2019-03-09 | 10 | Daman | ITU World Triathlon | Mixed Relay Series | 0:20:04 |
| 2019-04-27 | 7 | Bermuda | ITU World Triathlon | Elite Men | 1:51:11 |
| 2019-05-11 | 1 | Chengdu | ITU Triathlon World Cup | Elite Men Semifinal 1 | 0:53:30 |
| 2019-05-12 | 12 | Chengdu | ITU Triathlon World Cup | Elite Men | 0:28:23 |
| 2019-05-18 | 3 | Yokohama | ITU World Triathlon | Elite Men | 1:43:26 |
| 2019-06-29 | 8 | Montreal | ITU World Triathlon | Elite Men | 0:54:16 |
| 2019-07-06 | DNF | Hamburg | ITU World Triathlon | Elite Men | DNF |
| 2019-08-16 | 7 | Tokyo | ITU Olympic Qualification Event World Triathlon | Elite Men | 1:50:41 |
| 2019-08-18 | 9 | Tokyo | ITU World Triathlon | Mixed Relay Series | 0:21:01 |
| 2019-08-31 | 29 | Lausanne | ITU World Triathlon Grand Final | Elite Men | 1:55:37 |
| 2019-09-07 | 3 | Banyoles | ITU Triathlon World Cup | Elite Men | 0:50:18 |
| 2020-09-05 | 14 | Hamburg | ITU Triathlon World Championships | Elite Men | 0:49:52 |
| 2020-09-06 | 12 | Hamburg | ITU Triathlon World Championships | Mixed Relay | 0:19:06 |
| 2020-09-13 | 5 | Karlovy Vary | ITU Triathlon World Cup | Elite Men | 1:53:06 |
| 2021-04-18 | 23 | Melilla | Europe Triathlon Cup | Elite Men | 00:51:16 |
| 2021-05-15 | 39 | Yokohama | World Triathlon Championship Series | Elite Men | 01:48:22 |
| 2021-05-21 | DNF | Lisbon | World Triathlon Mixed Relay Olympic Qualification Event | Mixed Relay | 00:00:00 |
| 2021-05-22 | 37 | Lisbon | World Triathlon Cup | Elite Men | 01:44:59 |
| 2021-06-06 | 25 | Leeds | World Triathlon Championship Series | Elite Men | 01:47:20 |
| 2021-07-26 | 7 | Tokyo | 2020 Olympic Games; Men's IndividualStart list, Event environment, Start positions, Results, Event facts, Event analysis, Qualification ranking held at Odaiba Marine Park | Men's Individual | 01:45:56 |
| 2021-07-31 | 11 | Tokyo | 2020 Olympic Games; Mixed - RelayStart list, Event environment, Start positions, Team composition, Results, Event facts, Event analysis, Qualification ranking held at Odaiba Marine Park | Triathlon - Mixed Relay | 01:26:43 |
