= Irnes =

Male given name

- Gender: Male

Other gender
- Feminine: Irnesa

Other names
- Variant forms: Mirnes, Ernes, Arnes
- Related names: Enes

Irnes is a male given name.

In the Balkans, Irnes is popular among Bosniaks in the former Yugoslav nations. The name's origins can be linked back to another popular name among Bosniaks, Enes/Anes, which is a name that has been modified, from Enes/Anes to Ernes/Arnes to Irnes/Mirnes. This region also has a female equivalent to the name: Irnesa.
