= Anis Ebeid =

Egyptian translator (1909–1988)

- Born: October 12, 1909; Cairo
- Died: December 10, 1988 (aged 79)
- Occupations: Translator; Writer

Anis Ebeid (1909–1988) is an Egyptian translator, to born to a Christian family, known for Arabic language subtitling of American movies. He was a pioneer in Arabic subtitling in the Middle East.

He graduated from Engineering college, and then travelled to Paris to study for the master's degree in Engineering. He was the first in the world to insert subtitles on 16-mm film. He kept the record for 40 years as the sole vendor of this service till 1944. The movie Romeo and Juliet was his first Arabic subtitled movie.

== Anis Ebeid Labs ==
In 1940, he established "Anis Ebeid Labs", a subtitling company based in Cairo, now a major subtitling service provider and film distribution agency in the Middle East.
