= Anisa =

Town of ancient Cappadocia

Coordinates: 38°51′03″N 35°38′06″E

Anisa (Ανίσα) was a town (δῆμος) of ancient Cappadocia, inhabited in Hellenistic, Roman, and Byzantine times. The key inscription identifying Anisa describe it as a politeuma. Although it did not control any territory outside its jurisdiction, it enjoyed internal self-government.

Its site is located at Kültepe, Kayseri Province in Asiatic Turkey. A second or first century BCE bronze tablet originating from this settlement revealed that Anisa was a prosperous city. It contained the names of officials (e.g. archons, prytaneis, and demiourgos) as well as various institutions (e.g. boule, ecclesia). The tablet, which was said to be stored at the city's temple of Astarte, also commemorated an act by the Cappadocian king Ariarathes granting the citizens of Anisa a new constitution.
