= Anis Chowdhury =

Bangladeshi writer, essayist, and dramatist

Anis Chowdhury (1929–1990) was a Bangladeshi writer, essayist, and dramatist.

== Early life ==
Chowdhury was born in 1929 in Kolkata, Bengal, British India. His birth name was Anisuzzaman Chowdhury but he is better known by his pen name, Anis Chowdhury. In 1946, he graduated from Presidency College. He graduated from the University of Dhaka in 1953.

== Career ==
Chowdhury was the sub-editor of the Ittehad from 1946 to 1947. He joined the civil service of Pakistan in 1954. He worked at Radio Pakistan and was stationed in Karachi. He wrote the play Manchitra in 1963 and Album in 1965. In 1968, he was awarded the Bangla Academy Literary Award for his contribution to drama writing. After the Independence of Bangladesh, he was appointed deputy director at Bangladesh Television. He then headed the External Publicity Department. In 1979, he was deputed to the Bangladesh Ministry of Foreign Affairs. He served in the Bangladesh Embassy in Pakistan as the Press Councillor.

== Death ==
Chowdhury died on 2 November 1990 in Dhaka, Bangladesh.
