= Anis Lassoued =

Tunisian film director, screenwriter and film editor

- Born: 1972 (age 53–54); Nabeul
- Occupations: film director, screenwriter and film producer
- Writing career
- Notable works: movies The Magic Drop (2005), My Shoes (2012) and Gadeha: A Second Life (2022).

Anis Lassoued (born 1972 in Nabeul, Tunisia) is a Tunisian film director, screenwriter and film producer. Many of his films feature young actors.

== Biography ==
Lassoued completed his studies in film direction at the Institut Maghrébin de Cinéma (Maghreb Institute of Cinema, IMC, Tunis) and continued his studies in cinematography at the University of Rome Tor Vergata. Then he did internships at La Fémis, the film and television school of the Paris Sciences et Lettres University, and at GSARA (Groupe socialiste d'action et de réflexion sur l'audiovisuel) in Liège, Belgium.

With the Tunisian actress, screenwriter and film producer Chema Ben Chaabane he founded the film production company Lumières Films in 2013.

== Filmography ==
Lassoued's films include:

Year	Film	Genre	Role	Duration (min)
2002	Les Poupées de sucre de Nabeul	Fiction short	Director	34 m
2005	Saba Flouss / The Magic Drop / Magic Harvest	Drama fiction short	Director and screenwriter	18 m
2009	Un été à Sidi Bouzekri	Documentary portrait	Director and co-screenwriter with Chema Ben Chaabane	45 m
2012	Sabbat El-Aïd / Souliers de l'Aïd (Les) / My Shoes	Drama fiction short	Director and co-screenwriter	30 m
2012	L'Opposant / The opponent	Political documentary portrait	Director	78 m
2018	Majnoun Al-Bahr / Le Fou de la Mer / Mad for the sea by Wassim Korbi	Documentary short on the painter Raouf Gara	Supervising producer	27 m
2022	Une seconde vie (Gadeha) / Gadeha: A Second Life	Drama fiction feature	Director and co-screenwriter with Chema Ben Chaabane	93 m

== Awards ==
Lassoued's films obtained two prizes and two nominations, such as:

Film	Festival	Award
Saba Flouss / The Magic Drop	Dubai International Film Festival	2006 Winner Muhr Award
Gadeha: A Second Life	SCHLINGEL International Film Festival for children and young audience	2022 Winner SLM Top Award, Best International Feature Film
