= Anis Al-Rafii =

Moroccan writer

- Born: 1976 (age 49–50); Casablanca, Morocco
- Occupations: Writer, novelist

Anis El-Rafei (Arabic: أنيس الرافعي) a Moroccan storyteller, was born in Casablanca in 1976. El-Rafei graduated from the Faculty of Letters and Human Sciences, specializing in linguistics and modern literary criticism. He is one of the most important short story hermits in Morocco and the Arab world. He remained faithful to writing the short story and did not leave it to write the novel, as many storytellers did. Samples of his works have been translated into French, English, Spanish, Portuguese, Persian and Chinese, and he was chosen as one of seven distinguished writers to participate in the second cycle of the International Prize for Arabic Fiction, Arab Booker.

== Biography ==
The experience of Anis Al-Rafii, a Moroccan storyteller from the nineties, is a new experience based on working on the aesthetics of experimentation, which the writer considers not very pubescent, but rather a yearning and constant motivation. His creative project included working in parallel arts such as cinema, composition, photography, and music, which are closely related to his cognitive and emotional interests, which the writer invested in to create a new experience in the Arabic story. Belgian-based Moroccan film director Ghobari El Hawari directed a short film inspired by the Dolls' clinic. He received the Gutenberg Prize and the Acciodi Prize. The stories of Anis Al-Rafei have been translated into many languages, and his works have received and continue to receive great attention and warmth from critics and specialists on the Moroccan and Arab levels. There are those who consider that Anis Al-Rafei, with his accumulated creative achievement, constitutes a real creative phenomenon in the field of the short story.

Dar Safsafa for Culture and Publishing chose to celebrate the storytelling experience of Anis Al-Rafai, by publishing eight books, in two parts, according to a special tab that included exercises, successions, notes, sounds, rituals, evidence, photograms and investigations. With the appendix of each part, the testimonies of Moroccan and Arab writers who accompanied the writer's experience by writing about it.

The Egyptian critic, Dr. Muhammad Al-Shahat, wrote on the back of the fourth cover of the book “The Tailor of Organizations”: “The narration of the book (The Tailor of Organizations) by the Moroccan storyteller Anis Al-Rafii operates on the principle of practicing creative writing as a (weaving) or (sewing) for a group of human bodies and situations, daily or cosmic. On the one hand, this (heterogeneous) book rises in its form and in its investigation of its cultural references, both Arab and Western, and woven with remarkable deliberation and patience, and whose quadrilateral geometric structure is formed in the form of a dress led by threads of questions and its compositions, drawing on the energy of ancient and medieval Arabic prose, paste with a modern narrative flavor”.

== Writings ==
He has published several collections of short stories, including:

- Scandals Above All Suspicion, 1999
- Things That Don't Happen, 2002
- Mr. Rebaja, 2004
- Parchment, 2006
- Tomato Can, 2007
- Butterfly weight on the roof of the bell, 2008
- Arrest of the Forest in a Bottle, Dar Azmana, 2009
- This is what will happen in the past, Spaces for Publishing and Distribution, 2010
- The Moroccan Company for the Relocation of the Dead, Supreme Council of Culture, 2011
- Areej Al-Bustan in the expenses of the blind - an imaginary story guide, Moroccan Arab House for Publishing and Printing, 2011
- Dolls Clinic, about Dar Al-Ain, 2015
- Museum of the Disabled, about Dar Al-Ain, 2017
- Tailoring bodies, on the authority of Dar Al-Ain, 2018
- Alternative Spirits Repository, Khatwat Wa Zalal Publishing and Distribution House, 2020
- dread archipelago; Al-Mu’azal Storybook, Khatwat Publishing and Distribution House, 2020
