= Eno (company) =

Chinese clothing and accessories company

Eno is a Chinese clothing and accessories company based in Shanghai, founded in 2006.
