= Anis Nagi =

Pakistani writer (1939–2010)

- Born: 1939; Sheikhupura, Pakistan
- Died: 7 October 2010 (aged 70–71); Lahore, Pakistan
- Occupations: Poet; teacher
- Children: 2
- Awards: Tamgha-e-Imtiaz

Academic background
- Education: University of the Punjab; Punjab University Oriental College; Government College, Lahore

Anis Nagi (1939–2010) was a Pakistani poet, novelist and critic who lectured at the Government College, Faisalabad and Government College, Lahore.

== Early life and education ==
Nagi was born in 1939 in the Punjabi city Sheikhupura and studied at Muslim High School No 2 before attending Government College, Lahore and MA in Urdu (First Class First-Gold Medalist) from Punjab University Oriental College. He earned his PhD from the University of the Punjab.

Whilst lecturing at Government College, Faisalabad and Government College, Lahore, Nagi passed the Pakistan Civil Service exam and became a member of the 1965 batch, eventually reaching grade 21 before he retired.

== Works ==
Nagi was at the forefront of the Urdu Literary Movement in the 1960s and authored 79 books including poetry, novels, translations, short stories, and critical reviews. He worked on Iqbal, Manto, Ghalib and Bulleh Shah and was one of the pioneers of Azad Nazam and Nayee Shairie.

== Death and legacy ==
Nagi died on 7 October 2010 in Lahore after suffering a cardiac arrest and directed that his books be donated to the Punjab Public Library.

Nagi was posthumously awarded Tamgha-e-Imtiaz by the Government of Pakistan in 2022 for his work in literature.

== Selected works ==
- Nagi, Anis (1974), Modern Urdu poems from Pakistan. Translated and edited by Anis Nagi, Lahore: Swad Noon Publications
- Nagi, Anis (1982), Modern Urdu Stories from Pakistan (2nd ed.), Lahore: Swad Noon Publications
- Anīs Nāgī. 1969. Shiʻrī Lassāniyāt. Lāhaur: Kitābiyāt.
- انىس ناگى and انيس ناگى. 1984. سعادت حسن منٹو. Lāhaur: جمالىات،.
