= Enno Lend =

Estonian economist

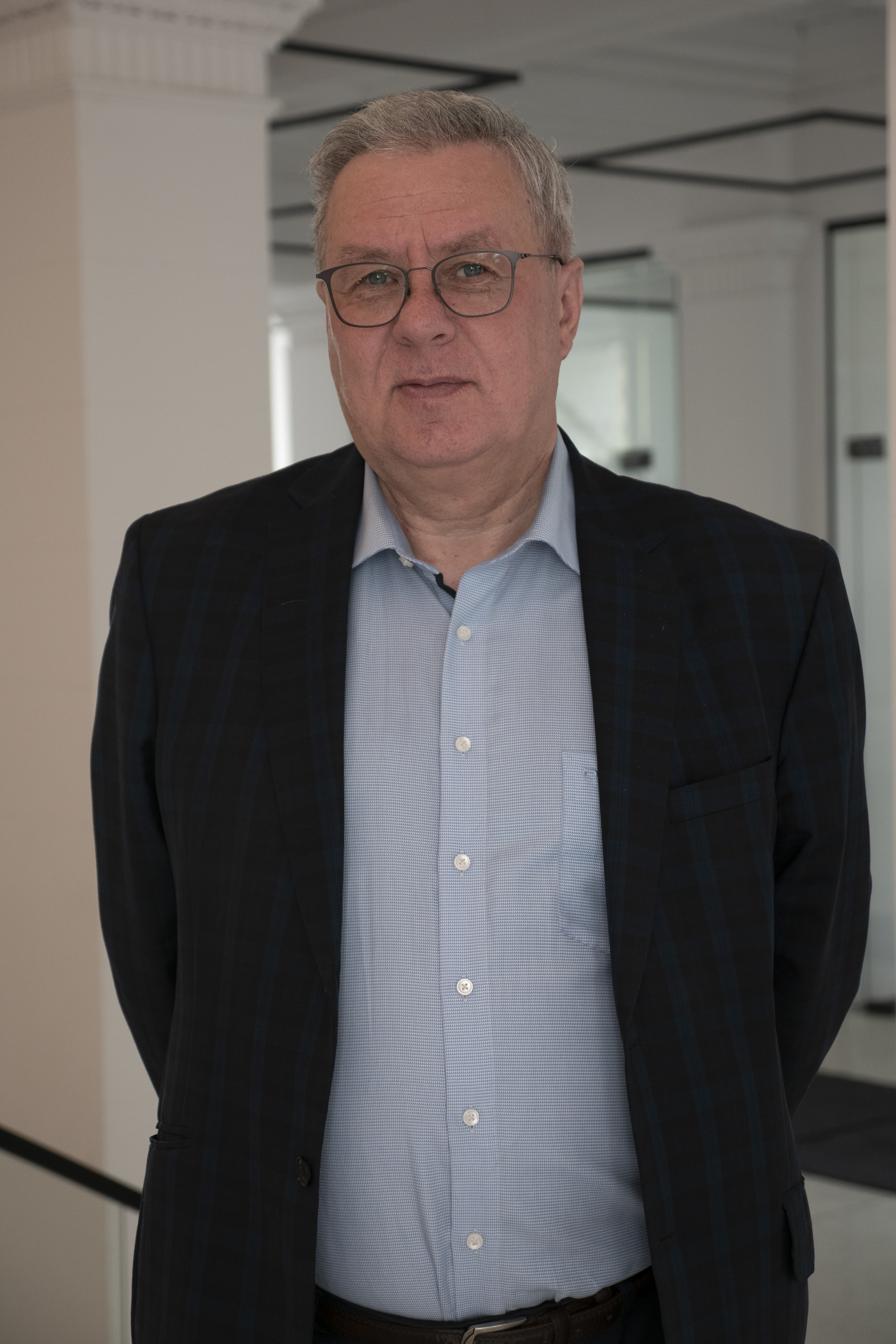
Enno Lend

Enno Lend (born 18 November 1957 in Tallinn) is an Estonian economist and rector of Tallinn University of Technology.

Since 2010 he is the rector of Tallinn University of Applied Sciences.

In 2005 he was awarded with Order of the White Star, IV class.
