= Environment Online =

Environment Online (ENO) is a global school network and web community for sustainable development, established 2000 in Finland

Environmental themes are studied throughout the school year, with campaigns arranged simultaneously around the world. Over 10,000 schools from 150 countries have taken part since the network began. The ENO program is coordinated and maintained by the ENO Programme Association, based in the city of Joensuu. Schools have made concrete pledges for helping the environment, such as having planted five million trees to date. ENO has won several international citations and prizes.
