= Xisca Tous =

Spanish-Turkish triathlete (born 1992)

Personal information
- Full name: Sinem Francisca Tous Servera
- Nationality: Spanish-Turkish
- Born: 30 June 1992 (age 34) Spain

Sport
- Sport: Triathlon
Medal record
Women's Triathlon
Representing Spain
World Beach Games
Gold medal – first place	2019 Doha	Beach Triathlon
Representing Turkey
Islamic Solidarity Games
Gold medal – first place	2025 Riyadh	Sprint Race
Asia Cup
Bronze medal – third place	2025 Dexing	Triathlon
Bronze medal – third place	2025 Lianyungang	Triathlon

Sinem Francisca Tous Servera (née Francisca Tous Servera; 30 June 1992), better known as Xisca Tous, is a Spanish-Turkish triathlete.

== Personal life ==
Xisca Tous Servera was born on 30 June 1992. The Spanish sportswoman applied for Turkish citizenship in April 2022, which was approved in October the same year.After naturalization, she took the Turkish given name Sinem.

== Sport career ==
=== Spain ===
She was part of the Spanish team, which became champion at the 2019 Doha World Beach Games in Qatar.

=== World Triathlon ===
During her naturalization process and then two years of waiting period between April 2022 and May 2024, she competed under the flag of World Triathlon.

=== Turkey ===
Tous represented Turkey at the 2023 European Games in Kraków, Poland. Her time of 2:05.11 placed her 37th ran.

She finished the 1.5 km (2 laps) swim, 40 km (6 laps) bike and 10 km (4 laps) run at the 2025 Asia Triathlon Cup Dexing in China in the third place with 1:59:06. Her time of 1:54. for the race distance 1.5 km (2 laps) swim, 39.2 km (8 laps) bike and 10 km (4 laps) run placed her in the eleventh rank at the 2025 World Triathlon Cup Chengdu in China. At the 2025 Asia Triathlon Cup Lianyungang in Chine, she placed third in the distance 1.5 km /2 laps) swim, 44 km (4 laps) bike and 10 km (2 laps) run with 2:16:10.

She competed at the 2025 Islamic Solidarity Games in Riyadh, Saudi Arabia, and won the gold medal in the Sprint race of Duuathlon.
