= Ed Enos =

Canadian football player (1934–2007)

Personal information
- Born: June 30th 1934
- Died: March 6, 2007 (aged 72)

Career information
- College: University of Connecticut

Career history
- 1957-1958: B.C. Lions

Edmund Francis "Ed" Enos (June 30, 1934 – March 6, 2007) was a Canadian Football League player and university athletics administrator.

A graduate of the University of Connecticut, he had a tryout with the New York Giants of the National Football League in 1956, but played pro football in Canada, with the B.C. Lions of the CFL in 1957 and 1958 (23 games.)

He is most famously known as a successful university athletics director. Quoting his 1998 Concordia University Sports Hall of Fame induction:

Dr. Ed Enos has made significant contributions to athletics at Concordia University and one of its founding institutions, Loyola College. He was appointed Director of Athletics in 1965 and immediately launched a progressive and wide-ranging program. When Loyola and Sir George Williams University merged in 1974 he became Concordia's first athletic director. Under his leadership, the name Stingers became one of the most respected in Canadian interuniversity competition. During his tenure a comprehensive intramural program was initiated and the Loyola Sports Hall of Fame was established. An acclaimed innovator and academic, his accomplishments extend beyond university athletics. He was a Founding Chairman of the Concordia Department of Exercise Science, as an Associate Professor of the department, a former Assistant Dean, Faculty of Arts and Science, and a member of Concordia's first Senate. Perhaps his greatest legacy is successfully persuading Canadians and countless others that there were better and healthier ways to run our lives.

The Quebec Student Sports Federation has named their women's hockey championship trophy the Dr. Ed Enos Trophy in his honour.
