= Enis (surname) =

Enis is a surname, and may refer to:

- Bill Enis (1934–1973), American sportscaster
- Curtis Enis (born 1976, American football player
- Hunter Enis (born 1936), American football quarterback
- Shalonda Enis (born 1974), American basketball player

== See also ==
- Ennis (surname)
- Enos (surname)
