= Anis Ahmad =

Social scientist

- Born: 23 March 1944 (age 82); Delhi, British Indian Empire

Academic background
- Education: University of Karachi; Temple University
- Influences: Integration of Ethical Values in Education; Interdisciplinary Research

Academic work
- Discipline: Comparative religion Islamic Jurisprudence; Modern Islamic Movements
- School or tradition: Islamic economic jurisprudence
- Institutions: Karachi University; Temple University; International Islamic University, Islamabad; Riphah International University
- Notable ideas: Introduced Integrated Curriculum at Graduate Level
- Awards: Fellow, University Science Malaysia

Anis Ahmad (Urdu: انیس احمد; born 23 March 1944; popularised as Prof. Dr. Anis) is a Pakistani social scientist, an educationist, and professor of Islam. He is recipient of award, by Higher Education Commission of Pakistan, awarded fellowship by the University Science Malaysia, also earned meritorious professorship at the International Islamic University, Islamabad, Pakistan. As first Vice-President of International Islamic University, Islamabad, he visualised and founded the Da’wah Academy of the I.I.U.I. He was the first Dean of the Faculty of Usul al-din and Faculty of Social Sciences of the IIU at Islamabad. He was first Dean of the Faculty of Islamic Revealed Knowledge and Human Sciences of the International Islamic University, Malaysia.

== Biography ==
Anis Ahmad was born into an educated and religiously oriented family. Anis was encouraged to study poetry and memorise couplets from Iqbal, Ghalib, Hali and other classical poets. Initially his mother tutored him in English and Urdu and his father taught him Persian.

Anis studied at Sindh Madrasatul Islam, in Karachi, which was alma mater of Quaid-e-Azam Muhammad Ali Jinnah, the founding father of Pakistan. He later joined Sindh Muslim College at Karachi and got his Bachelors in Philosophy and Psychology. He represented his college in inter university debates and was editor of Urdu section of college magazine. He pursued his Masters in department of Islamic History at the University of Karachi and secured first class in his exams. Anis became a member of Islami Jamiat-e-Talaba during his university studies, further engaging with the student community while pursuing his academic journey. He was elected in the student's union of the university; he also served as general secretary of Islamic Studies Society and organised intellectual activities.

After completing his masters in 1963 he was appointed as lecturer in the department of Islamic history at University of Karachi. He contributed articles in Urdu and English journals. He taught Islamic History at Karachi University till 1969, when he was offered scholarship by the Temple University Pennsylvania. He did his M.A. and PhD from Temple University in Islamic and Comparative Religion. He also taught at Appalachian State University and Temple University till 1981 when he was invited by the International Islamic University, Islamabad to establish faculty of Islamic Learning (Kulliyah Usul al-Din). He joined the university in 1981 as Directory of Department of Da'wah and Qir'at which was re-designated as Kulliyah Usul al-Din in 1983. He was appointed as the first dean of the faculty. He also initiated idea of a continuing education and training centre of the university under the name Da'wah Academy and was appointed its founding Director General in 1984. He also served as first Vice-President of the International Islamic University Islamabad.

Anis introduced comparative religious studies in the faculty of Usul al-Din and taught and supervised research throughout his career as a meritorious professor of comparative religions. He left Pakistan to assist the International Islamic University Malaysia, at Kuala Lampur in development of a new faculty, i.e. Faculty of Islamic Revealed Knowledge and Heritage. As dean of this faculty he led his faculty members in realisating the concept of Islamization of knowledge. His involvement in the movement started in 1972 when the Association of Muslim Social Scientists was founded in Illinois Institute of Technology and he was elected as its secretary general and later became its president. During his involvement with AMSS, the concept of islamisation of knowledge was developed by Prof. Isma'il Raji al-Faruqi, the founding president of AMSS.

Anis organised yearly seminars, conferences, workshops for economists, politicians, sociologists, psychologists, historians, religionists, anthropologists and linguists during his stay of over a decade in the US With a rich background in Islamization of Social Sciences he tried to translate this concept into the curriculum of Human Sciences at International Islamic University Malaysia. With the graduation of first batch of fifteen hundred students in the Kulliyah of Islamic Revealed Knowledge and Human Sciences, he returned to International Islamic University in 1994.

== Academic contributions ==
Anis introduced a course in integration of Islamic ethical values in social and applied sciences as university requirement in all programs offered by Riphah International University Islamabad (as founding Vice-Chancellor 2003-till date). This caters for ethics in practice, personality development, and identity development of studies. A similar initiative was taken by him to introduce a mandatory Post Graduate Diploma for all teachers of the University in Professional Ethics and Training Methodology. This provides two semester training in curriculum planning, evaluation methods, communication skills and ethical practices.

At the International Islamic University Islamabad he introduced the scientific study of religion. He established department of comparative religion for interdisciplinary study of religion and to avoid polemical and theological controversies. He was able to attract students from China, Korea, Thailand, Sri Lanka, Indonesia, Turkey, Nigeria, Kenya, South Africa, Afghanistan, Bosnia and Herzegovina and Mauritius to study comparative religion.

He has made monthly contributions in the scholarly journal Tarjuman al-Qur'an offering legal views, based on the Qur'an and hadith in a non-sectarian, educative way. He also responds to question in social, economic, cultural and religious matters in a weekly live TV program as part of his sciences to community.

He has contributed articles in Oxford Encyclopedia of the Islamic World, Encyclopedia of Islam, The Muslim World Book Review, the Insights and his controlled contributed chapters in books.

He writes on contemporary topics such as; fundamentalism, secularism, contemporary juristics, environmental ethics, Jihad, medical ethics, education, family, world religions, and Qur'anic studies.

He has participated in over 100 international professional conferences, seminars and workshops as resource person and keynote speaker.

== Academic responsibilities held in past ==
- Presently hold the position of Vice Chancellor (Riphah International University).
- Chairman National Rehmatu Lil Almin authority, Govt. of Pakistan.
- Dean, Faculty of Islamic Revealed Knowledge & Human Sciences, International Islamic University, Malaysia.
- Vice-President, International Islamic University, Islamabad.
- Founder Dean, Faculty of Social Sciences, International Islamic University, Islamabad.
- Founder Dean, Faculty of Usul-al-Din, International Islamic University, Islamabad.
- Founder Director General of the Da'wah Academy of International Islamic University, Islamabad.
- Vice-Chairman, Institute of Policy Studies Islamabad.
- President, Association of Muslim Social Scientists, USA

== Teaching experience ==
- The Appalachian State University, North Carolina, USA
- Lanzho University, China
- The Temple University, Philadelphia, Pennsylvania, USA
- International Islamic University, Malaysia.
- International Islamic University, Islamabad, Pakistan.
- The Karachi University, Karachi, Pakistan.
- National Defense Universities, Islamabad, Pakistan.
- Foreign Service Academy, Islamabad, Pakistan.
- Federal Judicial Academy, Islamabad.
- National Institutes of Public Administration, Pakistan.
- Staff Colleges and War Colleges.
- Shari'ah Academy of the IIU, Islamabad and other academic institutions.

== Special awards ==
University Fellow (1969–1971), Temple University, Philadelphia

Sitara-e-Imtiyaz

== Publications ==
1. Secularism: A pseudo – Religion in Islam and the Secular Mind, Karachi 2008.
2. Fundamentalism, Extremism and Islam in Criticism, Islamabad, 2007.
3. Family in Pakistan: Challenges and prospects" in Dr Umar caha, Ed..Gunumuzde Aile Istanbul, 2007.
4. Theoretical Foundations of Islamic Bio-Medical Ethics, in Journal of Islamic International Medical College, Islamabad, Vol.No.1 2006.
5. ’Iran and Future of Peace in the Region’’, The West and Islam Vol XI, No. 1–2 Islamabad, July 2007.
6. Women and Social Justice: An Islamic Paradigm, Islamabad (Pakistan), Institute Of Policy Studies.
7. Kaden Ve Sosyal Adalet, Beyan Yayinlari, Istanbul (Turkey).
8. Al-nisa al-Muslim at wa al-ta’lim al-ali, Riyadh (Saudi Arabia), Arab Bureau of Education for the Gulf States, (Arabic).
9. Muslim Women and Higher Education, Islamabad (Pakistan), Institute of Policy Studies
10. Islamic Da’wah Programmes and Prospect, Monograph, Islamabad (Pakistan), International Islamic University.
11. Islah-i-Mu’ashrah: Some Ideas For Islamic Social Reform, Monograph, Islamabad (Pakistan), International Islamic University.
12. Mashahir-I-Islam, Karachi, Jamiat al-Falah, Tr. Ed.(Urdu).
13. “Ramadan”, the Oxford Encyclopedia of the Modern Islamic World New York, 1995, Vol. 3.
14. “Sayyed Abul A’la Mawdudi: Life and works”, Encyclopedia of Islam, Istanbul, Turkey.
15. “Shibli Nu’mani: life and Works,”Encyclopedia of Islam, Istanbul, Turkey.
16. “Family in Pakistan”, Worldwide State of Family, ed. Gordon L. Anderson, St. Paul. Minnesota, PWPA, 1995.
17. “Cultural Clash in a New Context”, West and Islam (Quarterly Urdu), Institute of Policy studies (IPS), Islamabad, NO.19, Vol.5, issue 4, October–December 2001.
18. “Islam and Muslims from an American Perspective”, West and Islam, IPS, Islamabad No. 18, Vol. 5, Issue 3, July–September 2001.
19. “Muslims Countries, Democratic Traditions and Islam”, West and Islam, IPS, Islamabad No. 17. Vol., Issue 2, April–June 2001.
20. “A Clash of Civilizations or a Dialogue”, West and Islam IPS, Islamabad No. 16, Vol. 5, Issue 1, January–March 2001.
21. “A Century of Islamic Revivalist Movements”, West and Islam IPS, Islamabad No. 13, Vol. 4, Issue 2, April–June 2001.
22. “West and Islam: The changing Perspectives”, West and Islam IPS, Vol. 3, Issue 4, October–December 1999.
23. “Secularism, Fundamentalism and Development”, West and Islam, IPS, Islamabad, Vol. 3, Issue 3, July September 1999.
24. “Modern Movements for Revival and Ijtehad”, West and Islam, IPS, Islamabad. No. 9, Vol. 3, Issue 2, April–June 1999.
25. “Modernism, Reform and Revival II’, West and Islam, IPS, Islamabad. No. 8, January–March 1999.
26. “Modernism, Reform and Revival II’, West and Islam, IPS, Islamabad. No. 7, October–December 1998.
27. “The Muslim Minorities Problems and Prospects”, West and Islam, IPS, Islamabad. No. 6, July–September 1998.
28. “Intellectual and Cultural Colonialism”, West and Islam, IPS, Islamabad. No. 5, April–June 1998.
29. “Islam and Liberation of Women”, West and Islam, IPS, Islamabad. No. 4, January–March 1998.
30. “West and its Political Apprehensions”, West and Islam, IPS, Islamabad. No. 3, October–December 1997.
31. “Fundamentalism: An Analysis”, West and Islam, IPS, Islamabad. No. 2, July–September 1997.
32. “Political Economy: An Islamic Paradigm”, proceedings in 2nd International Business Forum, Istanbul (Turkey). Nov 96, pp. 1–25.
33. “Islamic Philosophy of Education”, proceedings in COMMECS, Karachi (Pakistan) May 1996.
34. “Islamic Movements as Agents of Social change: Framework for Analysis”, proceedings in International Conference on Islam & Change, Kuala Lumpur (Malaysia). 1996, pp. 1–27.
35. “Islamization of Laws and Economy: Case Studies on Pakistan”, introduction at Seminar at institute of Policy Studies, Islamabad (Pakistan). 1996, pp. 11–31.
36. “Use of Technology for Training of Da’wah”, proceedings in International Conference on Role of University in Da’wah, Al-Azhar University Cairo (Egypt). April 1987.
37. “Towards a Long-Term Strategy for Islamic Education”, proceedings in Regional Islamic Education Seminar, PERKIM, Kuala Lumpur. Nov 1986.
38. “Pakistan”, Political Handbook of the World, ed. Arthur S. Banks, New York (McGraw-Hill Book Co.).1979.
39. “Opinion Formation in Islam”, proceedings in The Association of Muslim Social Scientists, Gray, Indiana. May 1974.
40. “Islam and the Oppressed Sex”, al-lttihad (Quarterly journal of Islamic Studies), Plainfield, Indiana. Vol.15, No. 1.
41. “The Miracle called Qur'an at the Mercy of Charlatans“, al-lttihad, Plainfield, Indiana. Vol. 15, No. 1.
42. “Introducing the Qur'an”, The Voice of Islam, Karachi (Pakistan). June 1968.
43. “Personal Liberty In Islam”, paper read at the Fourth All-Pakistan Political Science Conference and published in Proceedings of All-Pakistan Political Science Society. Reproduced by the Al-Muarif (Journal of the Institute of Islamic Culture), Lahore. June 1968.
44. “The Concept of Man in the Qur'an”, paper read at the All-Pakistan Philosophical Congress in May 1966. Published in Fikro-Nazar (Journal of the Central Institute of Islamic Research), Rawalpindi (Pakistan). September 1966.
45. “Educational Thought of Ibn-e-Khaldun”, paper read at the Sixteenth All-Pakistan History Conference at Karachi in 1958, published in the Journal of the Pakistan Historical Society, Karachi (Pakistan). Vol. XVI, Parts II & III, 1958.

== Articles ==
- Encyclopedia of Islam, Istanbul, Turkey.
- The Oxford Encyclopedia of the Modern Muslim World, N.Y., USA
- The Muslim World Book Review, Leicester, UK.
- The Policy Perspective, Islamabad.

== Participation in international conferences ==
Keynote addresses and talks delivered in International conferences, Seminars and Workshops in: Australia, Bahrain, Canada, Guyana, France, Hungary, Iran, Japan, Malaysia, Mauritius, Nepal, New Zealand, Saudi Arabia, South Africa, Sri Lanka, Turkey, Trinidad and Tobago, United Arab Emirates, United Kingdom and the USA among others.
