= Enes Tepecik =

Austrian footballer

Personal information
- Date of birth: 11 March 2004 (age 22)
- Place of birth: Austria
- Height: 1.74 m (5 ft 9 in)
- Position: Midfielder

Team information
- Current team: Ankaragücü
- Number: 70

Youth career
- 2011–2015: Wiener Neustadt
- 2016–2017: SV Willendorf
- 2017–2020: AKA St. Pölten

Senior career*
Years	Team	Apps	(Gls)
2020–2023	Rapid Wien II	37	(5)
2023–	Ankaragücü	0	(0)
2024–2025	→ Ankaraspor (loan)	12	(1)

International career^{‡}
2019	Austria U15	4	(0)
2019–2020	Austria U16	9	(3)
2020	Austria U17	1	(0)
2021–2022	Austria U18	10	(1)
2022	Austria U19	3	(0)
- * Club domestic league appearances and goals as of 10 May 2025 ‡ National team caps and goals as of 27 September 2022

Enes Tepecik (born 11 March 2004) is an Austrian footballer who plays as a midfielder for Turkish club Ankaragücü.

== Club career ==
On 1 September 2023, Tepecik signed a three-year contract with Turkish club Ankaragücü.

== International career ==
Born in Austria, Tepecik is of Turkish descent. He is a youth international for Austria.

== Career statistics ==
=== Club ===
As of 26 October 2020.

Appearances and goals by club, season and competition
Club	Season	League			Cup		Continental		Other		Total	
Club	Season	Division	Apps	Goals	Apps	Goals	Apps	Goals	Apps	Goals	Apps	Goals
Rapid Wien II	2020–21	2. Liga	2	0	–		–		0	0	2	0
Career total			2	0	0	0	0	0	0	0	2	0
