= Enes Kızılcık =

Turkish triathlete (born 2001)

Personal information
- Nationality: Turkish
- Born: 18 April 2001 (age 25) Balıkesir, Turkey

Sport
- Sport: Triathlon
Medal record
Men's Triathlon
Representing Turkey
Islamic Solidarity Games
Silver medal – second place	2025 Riyadh	Sprint Race
Balkan Championships
Silver medal – second place	2025 Mudanya	Triathlon

Enes Kızılcık (born 18 April 2001) is a Turkish triathlete.

== Sport career ==
Kızılcık started her triathlon career with swimming at an early age. He competed in freestyle, breaststroke and backstroke events for Balıkesir Swimiing Club at the 2010 Summer Swimming Tournament of age group 9-10 in Konya. He is a member of Balıkesir BB Sports Club.

He competed at the 2025 European Triathlon Championships in Istanbul, Turkey, without success.

He took the silver medal at the 2025 Europe Triathlon Balkan Championships in Mudanya, Bursa, Turkey.

He competed at the 2025 Islamic Solidarity Games in Riyadh, Saudi Arabia, and won the silver medal in the Sprint race of Duuathlon.

== Personal life ==
A native of Balıkesir, Turkey, Enes Kızılcık was born on 18 April 2001.
