= Anis Kachohi =

French singer (born 1977)

Anis Kachohi (born 1977 in Pontoise, Val-d'Oise) is a French singer. He is also known as Anis.

== Career ==
In the spring of 2003, Anis released his first album Gadjo décalé with the studio "Gang" in Paris. The album contained autobiographical and sober lyrics. The music is a mix of his soul, reggae, and blues influences.

The television station France 2 picked him as the Singer of the Summer in 2007; the channel regularly showed videos of "Cergy", "Intégration", and "Avec le Vent". In 2005 he followed up with the album La Chance on Virgin/EMI.

== Discography ==
- 2003: Gadjo décalé (Tchad House)
- 2005: La Chance (Virgin/EMI)
- 2008: Rodéo Boulevard
