= Anisa Shaheed =

Afghan journalist (born 1989)

- Born: 1989 (age 36–37); Kabul, Afghanistan
- Occupation: journalist
- Organization: Tolonews (2009–2021)
- Known for: Coverage of corruption, terrorism, and the COVID-19 pandemic in Afghanistan

Anisa Shaheed (born 1989) is an Afghan journalist who has received numerous international awards for her coverage of human rights abuses and corruption in Afghanistan.

== Life ==
After growing up under Taliban rule, she attended university after the 2001 invasion of Afghanistan and began a career in journalism. Starting as a reporter for Cheragh Daily and Hindu Kush News, she joined TOLOnews in 2009. She remained there for 12 years until the 2021 Taliban offensive, which saw the group return to power. She currently resides in the United States.

== Career ==
Shaheed has covered various terrorist attacks and corruption scandals. She covered a terrorist attack at Kabul Maternity Hospital in 2020, which killed 24 women and children. For this, along with her work covering the shortcomings of the government response to the COVID-19 outbreak in Afghanistan, she received a recognition from Reporters without Borders. Other awards and recognitions received by Shaheed include a Knight International Journalism Award from the International Center for Journalists in 2022, and 2021 journalist of the year from Free Speech Hub Afghanistan. In 2017 she exposed a scandal involving the Vice President of Afghanistan, Abdul Rashid Dostum. A former ally, Ahmad Eshchi, claimed that he was kidnapped on the vice-president's orders and suffered violence and sexual abuse at the hands of Dostum and other men. Dostum fled the country in May 2017, but returned soon after.
