= Sarah Eno =

American physicist

Sarah C. Eno
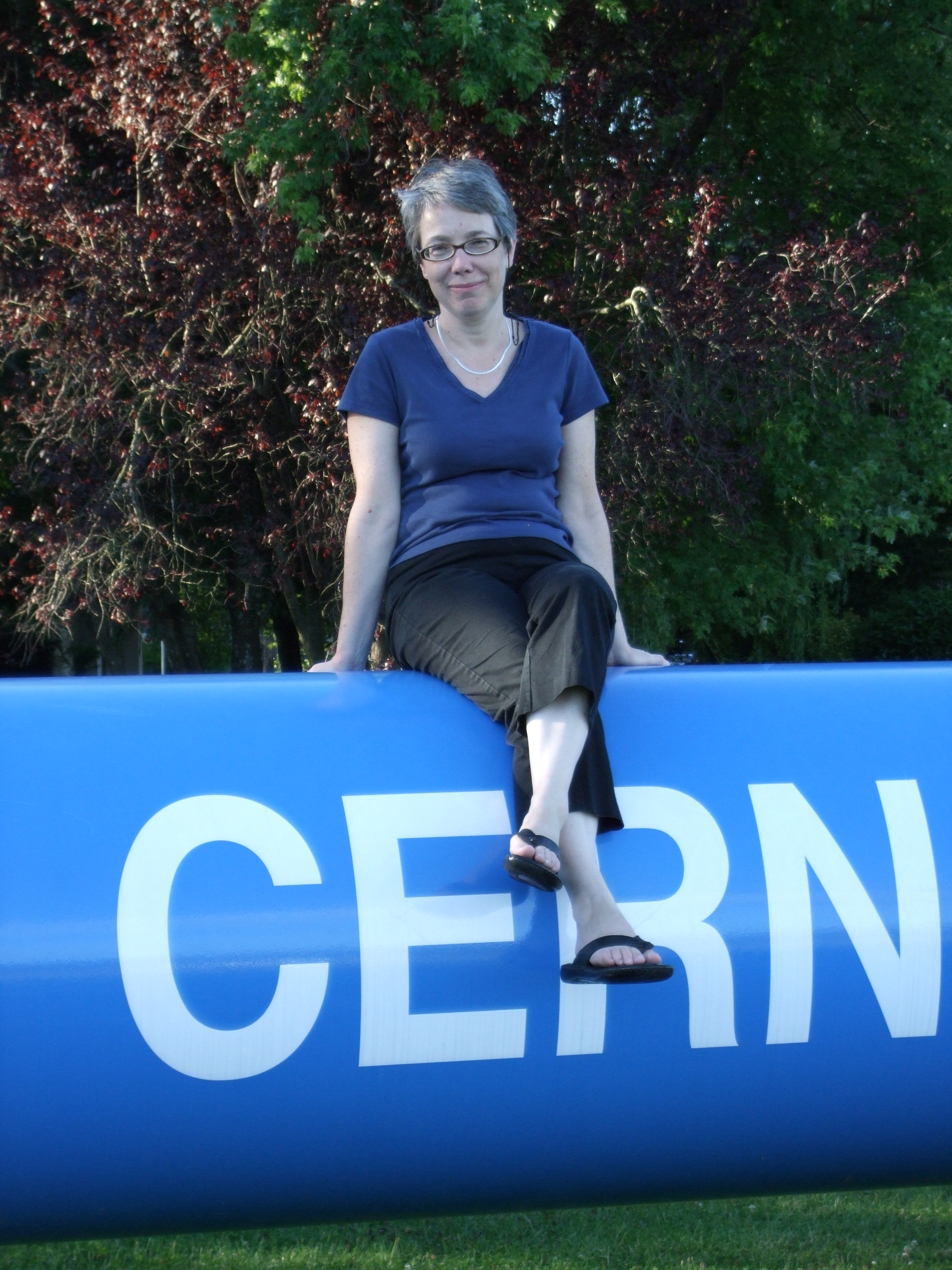
- Education: University of Rochester, Ph.D. (1990); Gettysburg College (1984)
- Awards: Fellow of the American Physical Society
- Scientific career
- Fields: Particle physics
- Workplaces: University of Maryland, College Park

Sarah C. Eno is an American experimental particle physicist at the University of Maryland, College Park, where she is a professor of physics and UMD Distinguished Scholar–Teacher. She has participated in several large experimental collaborations in high-energy physics, including the AMY experiment at the Japanese TRISTAN particle accelerator, the DØ experiment at Fermilab in the US, the Collider Detector at Fermilab, and the Compact Muon Solenoid experiment at the Large Hadron Collider in France and Switzerland.

== Education and career ==
Eno is a 1984 graduate of Gettysburg College, where she was salutatorian. She studied physics as a graduate student at the University of Rochester, earning a master's degree there in 1986 and completing her Ph.D. in 1990.

After postdoctoral research at the Enrico Fermi Institute of the University of Chicago, she joined the University of Maryland faculty in 1993. She was tenured as an associate professor in 1999, and promoted to full professor in 2005.

== Recognition ==
In 2009, Eno was elected as a Fellow of the American Physical Society (APS), after a nomination from the APS Division of Particles and Fields, "for contributions in particle physics involving electroweak parameters, precision electroweak measurements, and physics beyond the Standard Model at the Tevatron". She was named to the 2021 class of Fellows of the American Association for the Advancement of Science.

The University of Maryland named her as a Distinguished Scholar–Teacher in 2014.
