= Enes Karić =

Bosnian Islamic scholar

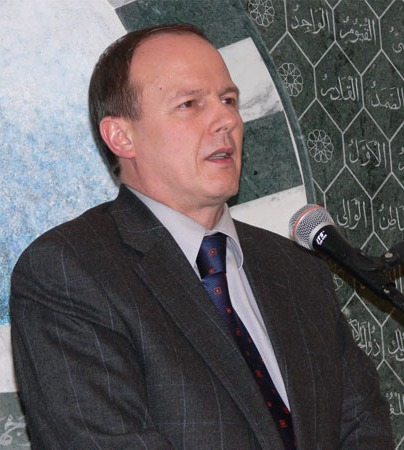
- Born: Enes Karić; May 16, 1958 (age 68); Travnik, Bosnia and Herzegovina

Academic background
- Education: University of Sarajevo, University of Belgrade
- Influences: Seyyed Hossein Nasr

Academic work
- Institutions: University of Sarajevo
- Notable works: Essays (on behalf) of Bosnia; Traditional Bosnia: Islamic Theological, Philosophical, and Logical Studies from the 15th Century Onward

Enes Karić (born May 16, 1958) is a Bosnian Islamic scholar and full professor of Quranic Studies at the Faculty of Islamic Studies, University of Sarajevo. From 1994 to 1996, he served as the Minister of Education, Science, Culture and Sports in the Republic of Bosnia and Herzegovina.

== Biography ==
Born on May 16, 1958, in Travnik, Bosnia and Herzegovina to Emin and Sabiha, Karić initially studied Islam and political science at the University of Sarajevo and graduated in 1981 and 1982 respectively. He earned a M.A. in philosophy from the same university in 1986, and obtained his Ph.D. in philology from the University of Belgrade in 1989. He has also completed other post-graduate and post-doctoral studies at the University of Cairo (1983), al-Azhar University (1983), Yale University (1990), and Oxford University (2006). Currently, he serves as full professor of Quranic Studies and History of the Interpretation of the Qur'an at the University of Sarajevo; Karić has also taught as a full professor at the University of Ljubljana. From 1994 to 1996, he served as the Minister of Education, Science, Culture and Sports in the Government of the Republic of Bosnia and Herzegovina.

== Works ==
- Essays (on behalf) of Bosnia (1999)
- The Bosniac Idea (2002)
- Essays on Our European Never-never Land (2004)
- Contributions to Twentieth Century Islamic Thought in Bosnia and Herzegovina (2011)
- The Black Tulip (2011)
- Traditional Bosnia: Islamic Theological, Philosophical, and Logical Studies from the 15th Century Onward (2016)

== See also ==
- Muzaffar Iqbal
