= Tema International School =

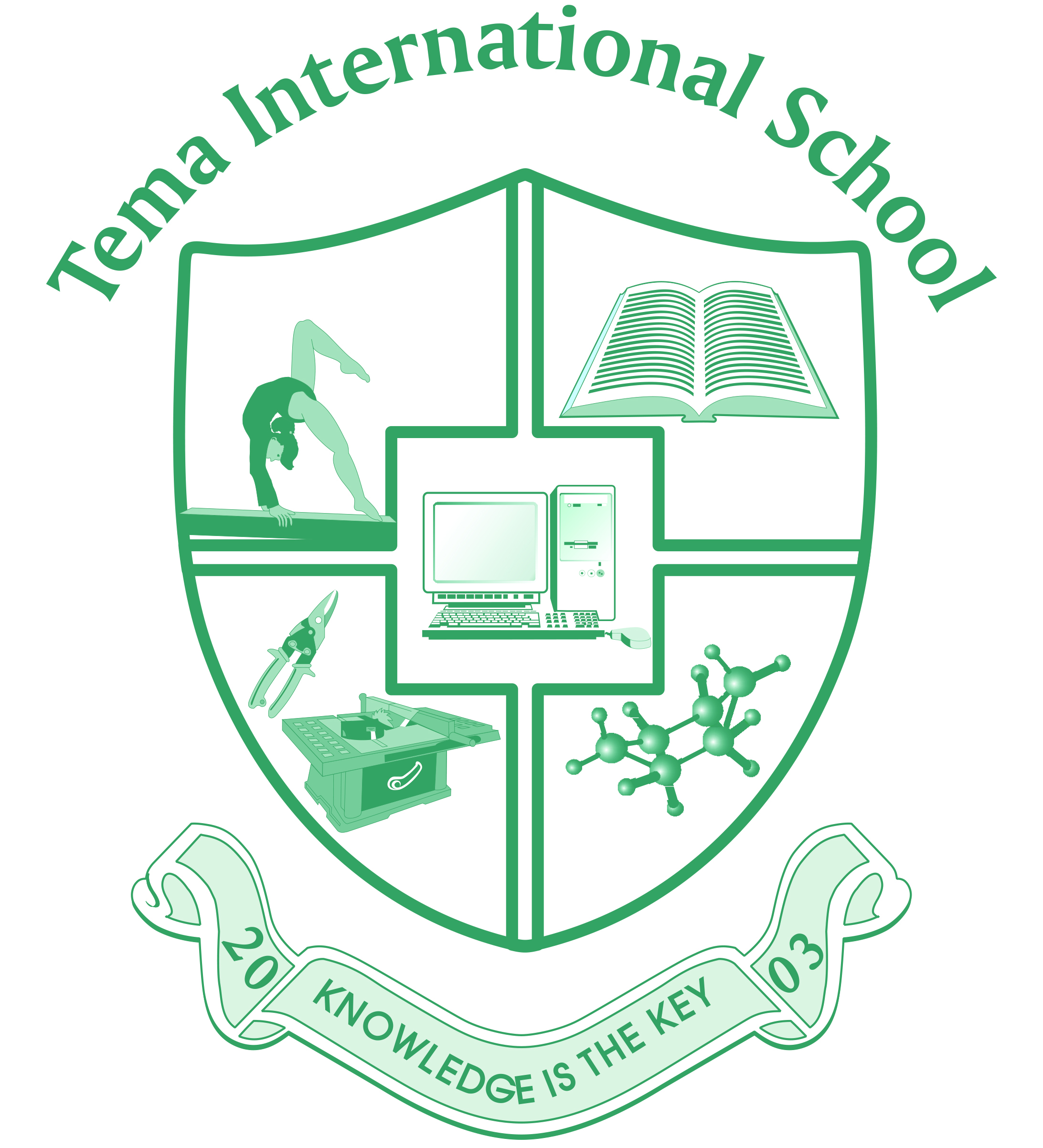
- Tema, Greater Accra Region; Ghana

Information
- Type: International Baccalaureate International School; Boarding School
- Motto: Knowledge Is The Key
- Established: 3 October 2003
- Founder: Comfort Adjavon Alphonse Adjavon
- Headmaster: Yvonne Tagoe
- Gender: Coeducational
- Age: 4 to 18
- Enrollment: 319
- Houses: Francis, Anthony, Catherine, Cecelia,
- Colours: Green and beige
- Website: http://www.tis.edu.gh http://www.ibo.org/school/002280

Tema International School is an international school based in Tema, Ghana, West Africa. Classes are offered from primary through to IB Diploma. The school year is divided into 2 semesters (August–December & January–June). The school was established in 2003.

== Curriculum ==
Tema International School is an International Baccalaureate (IB) accredited school, offering the IB Primary Years Programme, IB Middle Years Programme for students aged 11 to 16 and the IB Diploma Programme for students aged 16 to 18.

== Enrollment ==
The school has a current enrollment of 319 students.

== Houses ==
The school has 4 houses between which students are split: Francis, Anthony, Catherine and Cecelia hostels.
