= Anis Aissaoui =

Tunisian footballer and coach

Anis Ben Abdallah Aissaoui (born September 23, 1973, in Tunis) is a former Tunisian national professional football player converted into a professional football head coach. He is the current head coach of the Libyan football team Al Entesar Club.

== Professional football player career ==
Aissaoui was scouted at the age of 12 by the prestigious Tunisian club Club Africain, joining the club's academy in 1985.

=== Youth career ===
- 1985–1991: Club Africain (Tunis, Tunisia)

=== Professional career ===
He began his professional career as a footballer in 1991 with his Academy Club.

- 1991–1994: Club Africain (Tunis, Tunisia)
- 1994–1995: AS Gabès (Gabès, Tunisia)
- 1995–1999: Mouloudia sportive de La Manouba (La Manouba, Tunisia)
- 1999–2002: Union sportive de Djebel Jelloud (Djebel Jelloud, Tunisia)

== Professional football head coach career ==
Freshly retired from the professional world, he decided to embark on a career as a professional football coach. In 2002, he decided to join the prestigious Tunisian club Club Africain.

- 2002–2004: Club Africain (Head Coach of the Youth Teams)
- 2004–2005: Club Africain (Head Coach of the Senior U15 Team)
- 2005–2006: Club Africain (Head Coach of the Senior U17 Team)
- 2006–2007: Club Africain (Head Coach of the Senior U19 Team)
- 2007–2008: Club Africain (Head Coach of the Senior U23 Team)
- 2008–2011: Jeunesse sportive de La Soukra (Head Coach of the Senior Professional Team)
- 2011–2012: Club olympique des transports (Head Coach of the Senior Professional Team)
- 2012–2015: Jeunesse sportive de La Soukra (Head Coach of the Senior Professional Team)
- 2015–2016: Al-Yarmouk FC Saudi Arabia (Head Coach of the Senior Professional Team)
- 2016–2017: Jeunesse sportive de La Soukra (Head Coach of the Senior Professional Team)
- 2017–2018: Saudi Baish Club (Head Coach of the Senior Professional Team)
- 2018–2019: Rafik Sorman (Head Coach of the Senior Professional Team)
- 2019–2020: Al-Adalah FC (Head Coach of the Senior Professional Team)
- 2020–2021: Shabaab al Jabal (Head Coach of the Senior Professional Team)
- 2021–2022: Darnes SC (Head Coach of the Senior Professional Team)
- 2022–2023: Club Rachad Bernoussi (Head Coach of the Senior Professional Team)
- 2023–2024: Al-Watan SC (Head Coach of the Senior Professional Team)
- 2024–: Al Entesar Club (Head Coach of the Senior Professional Team)

== Personal life ==
Anis Aissaoui speaks fluent French and Arabic.

== Honors ==
As a head coach:

- 2003–2004: Champion of Tunisia
- 2004–2005: Champion of Tunisia
- 2005–2006: Champion of Tunisia and Winner of the Cup of Tunisia
- 2006–2007: Winner of the Cup of Tunisia
- 2013–2014: Promotion to Division One "Tunisian League 2" and 3rd of the Championship of "Tunisian 3rd Tier League 3"
- 2015–2016: Champion of Jizan Province
