= Anis Chouchène =

Tunisian poet and activist (born 1982)

- أنيس شوشان
- Born: 1982 (age 43–44); Tunis, Tunisia
- Writing career
- Language: Arabic, English, French
- Genre: Poetry slam

Anis Chouchène (Arabic: أنيس شوشان; born 1982) is a Tunisian poet and activist, who gained recognition for his "thought-provoking" and "revolutionary" poems. He is known for addressing various social and political issues in his works, including slavery, racism, human rights, citizenship, peace, and the decline of Arab society.

== Biography ==
Chouchène was born in the Tunis, Tunisia, and he graduated from the field of audio-visual technology. He also specialises in television directing. Chouchène won many awards as a result of his poems, which he writes in Modern Standard Arabic, Tunisian Arabic, English and French. Chouchène is also a dancer and singer.

Chouchène explained that his last name means "the brown one" and or "the darkest colour" in Tunisian Arabic. He stated that his nickname comes from the Chouchènian tribe and clan, and it also means slave, and he chose to carry it as a title. Chouchène identifies as Tunisian by nationality, African by identity, and a member of the global human community. Through his artistic expression, Chouchene shares narratives rooted in his community to advocate for the existence and well-being of his generation. His creative works encompass a call for peace as a universal religion, dreams as a guiding principle, art as a powerful tool, the Earth as a shared home, and differences as sources of uniqueness. He firmly believes that the universe belongs to all humanity.

Since 2014, Chouchene has been actively involved in cultural and artistic endeavors as part of the Manamty Society. He has participated in various performances and events related to his interests in poetry, music, dance, cinema, and theater. Notable appearances include the Festival of Afrabia in Khartoum (2018), Amazigh New Year celebrations in Agadir, Morocco (2018), and the Amazigh Festival in Tangier, Morocco (2017). Chouchene has collaborated in joint concerts with musician Charbel Rouhana in Jordan (2018) and Bekaa, Lebanon (2016). He has showcased his work at literary gatherings in Tunisia, as well as poetry evenings at the African Literature Festival in Bayreuth, Germany (2017), and the Sheikh Ebrahim Center for Culture and Research in Bahrain (2016). In addition, Chouchene performed as a dancer at the Mestizo Arts Festival in Antwerp (2013) and as part of the Dance Group of the Bizerte Youth House in Tunisia (1999–2012). In 2019, Chouchène joined UN-Maghreb's Campaign Against Violence Against Women.

Beyond his artistic pursuits, Chouchene actively engages in cultural activities and forums both within and outside Tunisia. He collaborates with human rights organisations and activists, such as the Arab Institute for Human Rights, Amnesty International, and Anna Lindh, to promote human rights and social justice. His dedication to these causes has been ongoing since 2011.

Chouchène views the Tunisian revolution as ongoing and emphasizes the need for personal and cultural transformation. Chouchene acknowledges the gap in human rights between Arab societies and developed countries and hopes that anti-racist protests will bring about justice. He sees politics as a game of lies and prefers to be a distinct voice outside of the political sphere. Chouchene recognises the price of peace but believes it is worth the risk. He also emphasising the importance of freedom of thought and the need to speak out against injustice.

In an interview on Sudania 24 TV, Chouchène discussed the notion of citizenship and human rights, highlighting the importance of questioning and challenging outdated customs prevalent in Arab societies. He emphasised the need for individuals to live according to their own desires and rights, rather than simply following the dictates of rulers.

Chouchène 's poem of peace, entitled "Alesh Ya Hekuma" (Why O' Government?), gained significant attention after it was broadcast on Hannibal Television in 2015. The poem harshly criticized the government and resonated with audiences during the Tunisian uprising. Chouchène has been referred to as the "Artist of Peace" due to his profound contributions to promoting peace through his poetry.

In another interview with Sky News Arabia, Chouchène expressed his concerns about the decline of Arab society, attributing it to a lack of self-criticism. He argued that Arab societies need to critically evaluate themselves and embrace a humanistic identity to unite and progress. Chouchène also criticised the notion of pan-Arabism, stating that it should be eradicated from history.

=== Poets ===
- Peace be upon you (Arabic: سلام عليكم)
- This land is for everyone (Arabic: هذه الأرض للجميع)
- Why when you left me (Arabic: لماذا حين رحلت عني)

=== Personal life ===
In July 2023, Chouchène married Eman Mousa.
