= Eno (1973 film) =

- Directed by: Alfi Sinniger
- Written by: Alfi Sinniger
- Produced by: Alfi Sinniger
- Starring: Brian Eno; Phil Manzanera; Marty Simon
- Music by: Brian Eno
- Production company: Teamwork films
- Distributed by: Fair Enterprises, Ltd.
- Release date: 1973
- Running time: 24 minutes
- Countries: United Kingdom; West Germany
- Language: English

Eno is a 1973 British documentary short film directed, written and produced by Alfons Sinniger. The subject of the film is musician Brian Eno (shortly after his departure from Roxy Music) and features the recording sessions for Eno's album Here Come the Warm Jets (1974).

== Cast ==
- Brian Eno
- Chris Spedding
- Busta Cherry Jones
- Marty Simon
- Phil Manzanera
- Magic Michael
- Cindy Cleaver

== Reception ==
The Monthly Film Bulletin wrote: "The film's structure lends the portrait an illusion of greater depth than it has, but the format readily accommodates several odd sidelights on its subject's tastes, interests and background. ... And even if the film ultimately has the air of a flexing of cinematic muscles (Sinniger is a recent graduate of the London Film School), it has the nous to recognise a show-stopper when it has one, and finishes delightedly with a sequence of Chris Spedding dubbing a Duane Eddy-styled guitar break on to one of the album tracks 'just as the man himself woulda played it'."
