= Athletics at the 2025 Islamic Solidarity Games – Results =

These are the results of the athletics competition at the 2025 Islamic Solidarity Games which took place on 17—20 November 2025 in Riyadh, Saudi Arabia.

== Men's results ==
=== 100 metres ===
Heats – 17 November
Wind:
Heat 1: -1.7 m/s, Heat 2: -3.5 m/s, Heat 3: -1.7 m/s, Heat 4: -4.1 m/s

Rank	Heat	Name	Nationality	Time	Notes
1	1	Emmanuel Eseme	Cameroon	10.37	Q
2	1	Caleb John	Nigeria	10.46	Q
3	3	Ali Anwar Al-Balushi	Oman	10.51	Q
4	3	Emanuel Archibald	Guyana	10.56	Q
5	1	Malham Al-Balushi	Oman	10.57	Q
6	4	Mustafa Kemal Ay	Turkey	10.59	Q
7	1	Abdullah Abkar Mohammed	Saudi Arabia	10.63	q
8	4	Claude Itoungue Bongogne	Cameroon	10.65	Q
9	4	Abdulaziz Atafi	Saudi Arabia	10.68	Q
10	3	Kossi Médard Nayo	Togo	10.76	Q
11	1	Ansu Badje	The Gambia	10.77	q
12	2	Kayhan Özer	Turkey	10.78	Q
13	2	Mamadou Fall Sarr	Senegal	10.82	Q
14	4	Akeem Stewart	Guyana	10.83	q
15	2	Ebrahima Camara	The Gambia	10.86	Q
16	3	James Taiwo Emmanuel	Nigeria	10.87	q
17	2	Zaid Al-Awamleh	Jordan	11.03	
18	1	Hassan Saaid	Maldives	11.18	
19	3	D'Angelo Huisden	Suriname	11.24	
20	1	Mohamed Bowba Soumaré	Mauritania	11.85	
21	4	N'Djiluni Semedo	Guinea-Bissau	11.98	
	2	Hachim Maaroufou	Comoros	DNS	
	2	Lukman Gurbandurdyyev	Turkmenistan	DNS	
	3	Guvanch Mattaganov	Turkmenistan	DNS	
	4	Kenneth Omuka	Uganda	DNS	

Semi-finals – 17 November
Wind:
Heat 1: 0.0 m/s, Heat 2: -0.4 m/s

Rank	Heat	Name	Nationality	Time	Notes
1	2	Ali Anwar Al-Balushi	Oman	10.26	Q
2	1	Emmanuel Eseme	Cameroon	10.27	Q
3	2	Abdulaziz Atafi	Saudi Arabia	10.33	Q
4	1	Malham Al-Balushi	Oman	10.34	Q
4	2	Mustafa Kemal Ay	Turkey	10.34	Q
6	2	Emanuel Archibald	Guyana	10.38	q
7	1	Abdullah Abkar Mohammed	Saudi Arabia	10.39	Q
8	1	Caleb John	Nigeria	10.42	q
9	2	Claude Itoungue Bongogne	Cameroon	10.45	
10	2	James Taiwo Emmanuel	Nigeria	10.46	
11	2	Kossi Médard Nayo	Togo	10.52	
12	1	Mamadou Fall Sarr	Senegal	10.64	
13	1	Ebrahima Camara	The Gambia	10.65	
14	2	Ansu Badje	The Gambia	10.69	
15	1	Kayhan Özer	Turkey	10.70	
	1	Akeem Stewart	Guyana	DQ	TR16.7.1

Final – 17 November
Wind: -0.5 m/s

Rank	Lane	Name	Nationality	Time	Notes
1st place, gold medalist(s)	4	Ali Anwar Al-Balushi	Oman	10.30	
2nd place, silver medalist(s)	3	Abdulaziz Atafi	Saudi Arabia	10.32	10.316
3rd place, bronze medalist(s)	5	Emmanuel Eseme	Cameroon	10.32	10.320
4	6	Malham Al-Balushi	Oman	10.41	
5	8	Emanuel Archibald	Guyana	10.44	
6	2	Mustafa Kemal Ay	Turkey	11.02	
	7	Abdullah Abkar Mohammed	Saudi Arabia	DQ	TR16.7.1
	1	Caleb John	Nigeria	DNS	

=== 200 metres ===
Heats – 18 November
Wind:
Heat 1: +1.2 m/s, Heat 2: -0.7 m/s, Heat 3: +0.5 m/s

Rank	Heat	Name	Nationality	Time	Notes
1	3	Abdulaziz Atafi	Saudi Arabia	20.60	Q
2	3	Chidera Ezeakor	Nigeria	20.72	Q
3	2	Emmanuel Eseme	Cameroon	20.82	Q
4	1	Ali Anwar Al-Balushi	Oman	20.88	Q
5	2	Alham Naghiyev	Azerbaijan	20.91	Q
6	3	Kossi Médard Nayo	Togo	21.02	q
7	1	Claude Itoungue Bongogne	Cameroon	21.12	Q
8	1	Batuhan Altıntaş	Turkey	21.24	q
9	3	Noelex Holder	Guyana	21.25	
10	2	Adama Jammeh	The Gambia	21.63	
11	2	Vitaliy Zems	Kazakhstan	21.70	
12	2	Godfrey Chanwengo	Uganda	21.76	
13	1	Yusuf Ali Abbas	Bahrain	21.79	
14	1	Zaid Al-Awamleh	Jordan	21.79	
15	3	Alieu Joof	The Gambia	21.89	
16	1	Robert Marcus	Guyana	21.93	
17	2	Mohamed Basiru Bah	Sierra Leone	22.44	
18	3	N'Djiluni Semedo	Guinea-Bissau	24.00	
	1	Lukman Gurbandurdyyev	Turkmenistan	DNS	
	2	Hachim Maaroufou	Comoros	DNS	

Final – 19 November

Wind: +0.4 m/s

Rank	Lane	Name	Nationality	Time	Notes
1st place, gold medalist(s)	5	Emmanuel Eseme	Cameroon	20.55	
2nd place, silver medalist(s)	6	Abdulaziz Atafi	Saudi Arabia	20.65	
3rd place, bronze medalist(s)	8	Claude Itoungue Bongogne	Cameroon	20.84	
4	7	Ali Anwar Al-Balushi	Oman	20.85	
5	3	Alham Naghiyev	Azerbaijan	20.86	
6	4	Chidera Ezeakor	Nigeria	20.97	
7	2	Kossi Médard Nayo	Togo	21.02	
	1	Batuhan Altıntaş	Turkey	DNS	

=== 400 metres ===
Heats – 18 November

Rank	Heat	Name	Nationality	Time	Notes
1	2	Rachid Mhamdi	Morocco	45.53	Q
2	2	Emmanuel Bamidele	United Arab Emirates	46.01	Q
3	1	Aaron Adoli	Uganda	46.03	Q
4	1	Suleiman Abdulrahman	United Arab Emirates	46.25	Q
5	2	Taha Hussein Yaseen	Iraq	46.41	q
6	3	Frédérick Mendy	Senegal	46.42	Q
7	1	Gafaru Badmus	Nigeria	46.48	q
8	1	Ashraf Hussen Osman	Qatar	46.94	
9	3	Ezekiel Eno Asuquo	Nigeria	46.97	Q
10	1	Revon Williams	Guyana	47.06	
11	2	Moussa Ali Issa	Bahrain	47.10	
12	1	Abdou Aziz Ndiaye	Senegal	47.15	
13	3	Evariste Nana Kuate	Cameroon	47.48	
14	1	Abbos Toshtemirov	Uzbekistan	47.78	
15	3	Abdennour Bendjemaa	Algeria	48.04	
16	2	Simeon Adams	Guyana	48.25	
17	3	Ibrahim Hissein	Qatar	49.37	
18	2	Mohamed Basiru Bah	Sierra Leone	49.72	
	3	Mohamed Yassine Zerhoum	Morocco	DQ	TR17.2.3
	3	Kenneth Omuka	Uganda	DNF	

Final – 19 November

Rank	Lane	Name	Nationality	Time	Notes
1st place, gold medalist(s)	5	Rachid Mhamdi	Morocco	45.40	
2nd place, silver medalist(s)	7	Emmanuel Bamidele	United Arab Emirates	45.71	
3rd place, bronze medalist(s)	2	Gafaru Badmus	Nigeria	45.71	
4	4	Aaron Adoli	Uganda	46.66	
5	3	Suleiman Abdulrahman	United Arab Emirates	46.67	
6	6	Frédérick Mendy	Senegal	46.67	
7	1	Taha Hussein Yaseen	Iraq	47.24	
	8	Ezekiel Eno Asuquo	Nigeria	DNF	

=== 800 metres ===
Heats – 18 November

Rank	Heat	Name	Nationality	Time	Notes
1	2	Tom Dradiga	Uganda	1:49.43	Q
2	2	Faisal Maghrabi	Saudi Arabia	1:49.47	Q
3	2	Ebrahim Al-Zofairi	Kuwait	1:49.51	Q
4	2	Ibrahim Abdirahman	Djibouti	1:49.55	q
5	1	Abubaker Haydar Abdalla	Qatar	1:50.09	Q
6	1	Abderrahman El Assal	Morocco	1:50.11	Q
7	1	Ali Amirian	Iran	1:50.17	Q
8	1	Ali Daher Guirreh	Djibouti	1:50.41	q
9	2	Makman Yoagbati	Togo	1:50.96	
10	1	Badr Mohamed Al-Suweid	Kuwait	1:51.03	
11	1	Sami Massoud Al-Yami	Saudi Arabia	1:53.21	
12	2	Mohammed Al-Suleimani	Oman	1:54.97	
	1	Pena Babaniyazov	Turkmenistan	DNS	
	2	Mohamed Ibrahim Abdinur	Somalia	DNS	
	2	Jumah Adam Mohamednour Nasir	Sudan	DNS	

Final – 20 November

Rank	Name	Nationality	Time	Notes
1st place, gold medalist(s)	Ali Amirian	Iran	1:46.18	
2nd place, silver medalist(s)	Abderrahman El Assal	Morocco	1:46.23	
3rd place, bronze medalist(s)	Abubaker Haydar Abdalla	Qatar	1:46.26	
4	Ebrahim Al-Zofairi	Kuwait	1:46.30	
5	Tom Dradiga	Uganda	1:48.20	
6	Faisal Maghrabi	Saudi Arabia	1:49.20	
7	Ali Daher Guirreh	Djibouti	1:49.74	
8	Ibrahim Abdirahman	Djibouti	1:51.52	

=== 1500 metres ===
Heats – 17 November

Rank	Heat	Name	Nationality	Time	Notes
1	2	Hafid Rizqy	Morocco	3:51.52	Q
2	2	Mehmet Çelik	Turkey	3:51.80	Q
3	2	Yanleh Abdi Abdillahi	Djibouti	3:51.82	Q
4	2	Anis Chott	Algeria	3:52.27	Q
5	2	Zouhair Aouad	Bahrain	3:59.19	Q
6	1	Anass Essayi	Morocco	3:59.53	Q
7	1	Salih Teksöz	Turkey	3:59.85	Q
8	1	Nursultan Keneshbekov	Kyrgyzstan	4:00.57	Q
9	2	Maxim Frolovskiy	Kazakhstan	4:01.01	Q
10	1	Tom Dradiga	Uganda	4:02.37	Q
11	1	Raed Al-Jadani	Saudi Arabia	4:02.58	Q
12	2	Shawn Roshan	Malaysia	4:05.91	
13	1	Makman Yoagbati	Togo	4:07.35	Q
14	1	Jumah Adam Mohamednour Nasir	Sudan	4:15.26	
	1	Mohamed Ibrahim Abdinur	Somalia	DNF	
	2	Ali Amirian	Iran	DNF	

Final – 19 November

Rank	Name	Nationality	Time	Notes
1st place, gold medalist(s)	Anass Essayi	Morocco	3:44.20	
2nd place, silver medalist(s)	Mehmet Çelik	Turkey	3:44.50	
3rd place, bronze medalist(s)	Anis Chott	Algeria	3:44.65	
4	Hafid Rizqy	Morocco	3:44.66	
5	Salih Teksöz	Turkey	3:45.75	
6	Nursultan Keneshbekov	Kyrgyzstan	3:47.81	
7	Raed Al-Jadani	Saudi Arabia	3:48.25	
8	Yanleh Abdi Abdillahi	Djibouti	3:48.50	
9	Maxim Frolovskiy	Kazakhstan	3:53.64	
10	Makman Yoagbati	Togo	3:58.02	
11	Tom Dradiga	Uganda	3:58.65	
	Zouhair Aouad	Bahrain	DNF	

=== 5000 metres ===
20 November

Rank	Name	Nationality	Time	Notes
1st place, gold medalist(s)	Mohamed Ismail Ibrahim	Djibouti	13:46.12	
2nd place, silver medalist(s)	Birhanu Balew	Bahrain	13:46.26	
3rd place, bronze medalist(s)	Samuel Simba Cherop	Uganda	13:46.45	
4	Nursultan Keneshbekov	Kyrgyzstan	13:47.70	
5	Abdikani Mohamed Hamid	Bahrain	13:54.19	
6	Ahmed Daher Ismail	Djibouti	14:07.13	
7	Raed Al-Jadani	Saudi Arabia	14:12.05	
8	Maxim Frolovskiy	Kazakhstan	14:34.73	
9	Babker Abdo Koudi	Sudan	14:35.44	
10	Ramazan Baştuğ	Turkey	14:48.18	
	Ahmed Wridat	Palestine	DNF	
	Leonard Chemutai	Uganda	DNS	

=== 10,000 metres ===
18 November

Rank	Name	Nationality	Time	Notes
1st place, gold medalist(s)	Birhanu Balew	Bahrain	29:06.58	29:06.577
2nd place, silver medalist(s)	Samuel Simba Cherop	Uganda	29:06.58	29:06.579
3rd place, bronze medalist(s)	Abel Chebet	Uganda	29:07.63	
4	Ayanleh Abdi Abdillahi	Djibouti	29:11.30	
5	Hani Idriss Hersi	Djibouti	29:12.90	
6	Abdikani Mohamed Hamid	Bahrain	29:17.35	
7	Ismail Dawoud Abdalla Nadir	Sudan	31:21.95	

=== 110 metres hurdles ===
Heats – 20 November
Wind:
Heat 1: +1.4 m/s, Heat 2: +1.9 m/s

Rank	Heat	Name	Nationality	Time	Notes
1	1	Badamassi Saguirou	Niger	13.39	Q
2	1	Yaqoub Al-Youha	Kuwait	13.71	Q
3	2	Ergash Normurodov	Uzbekistan	14.00	Q
4	2	Mikdat Sevler	Turkey	14.11	Q
5	1	Yevgeniy Prokudin	Kazakhstan	14.12	Q
6	2	Amine Bouanani	Algeria	14.22	Q
7	1	Muhammad Hazriq Cik Mat Klau	Malaysia	14.28	q
8	2	Baqer Al-Jumah	Saudi Arabia	14.29	q
9	2	Muhin Md Tanvir Faisal	Bangladesh	15.33	

Final – 20 November

Wind: +0.6 m/s

Rank	Lane	Name	Nationality	Time	Notes
1st place, gold medalist(s)	5	Yaqoub Al-Youha	Kuwait	13.62	GR
2nd place, silver medalist(s)	4	Badamassi Saguirou	Niger	13.89	
3rd place, bronze medalist(s)	6	Mikdat Sevler	Turkey	13.91	
4	2	Amine Bouanani	Algeria	13.93	
5	3	Ergash Normurodov	Uzbekistan	13.96	
6	8	Baqer Al-Jumah	Saudi Arabia	14.38	
7	1	Muhammad Hazriq Cik Mat Klau	Malaysia	14.65	
	7	Yevgeniy Prokudin	Kazakhstan	DNF	

=== 400 metres hurdles ===
18 November

Rank	Lane	Name	Nationality	Time	Notes
1st place, gold medalist(s)	4	Berke Akçam	Turkey	49.22	GR
2nd place, silver medalist(s)	5	El Mehdi Dimocrati	Morocco	49.58	
3rd place, bronze medalist(s)	6	İsmail Nezir	Turkey	50.87	
4	3	Naif Rashid Al-Subaie	Saudi Arabia	51.40	
5	7	Najimul Hossain Roni	Bangladesh	51.51	
6	8	Hasanbek Rustamjonov	Uzbekistan	53.63	
7	2	Muhammadrizoi Mirzozoda	Tajikistan	54.23	
8	1	Ibrahim Adamou Mahamat Sani	Chad	55.62	

=== 3000 metres steeplechase ===
17 November

Rank	Name	Nationality	Time	Notes
1st place, gold medalist(s)	Salaheddine Ben Yazide	Morocco	8:51.64	
2nd place, silver medalist(s)	Mohamed Ismail Ibrahim	Djibouti	8:51.89	
3rd place, bronze medalist(s)	Omar Seraïche	Algeria	8:51.96	
4	Leonard Chemutai	Uganda	8:55.94	
5	Khalid Mohamed Hazazi	Saudi Arabia	9:28.17	
	Mohamed Tindouft	Morocco	DNF	

=== 4 × 100 metres relay ===
19 November

Rank	Lane	Nation	Competitors	Time	Notes
1st place, gold medalist(s)	3	Saudi Arabia	Mohammed Dawood Abdullah, Abdulaziz Atafi, Abdulaziz Al-Jadani, Abdullah Abkar Mohammed	39.19	
2nd place, silver medalist(s)	5	Oman	Rashid Al-Aasmi, Malham Al-Balushi, Mohamed Obaid Al-Saadi, Ali Anwar Al-Balushi	39.21	
3rd place, bronze medalist(s)	4	Nigeria	Caleb John, Chidera Ezeakor, Ezekiel Eno Asuquo, James Taiwo Emmanuel	39.51	
4	6	Turkey	Kayhan Özer, Mustafa Kemal Ay, Batuhan Altıntaş, Mikdat Sevler	39.85	
5	2	Guyana	Emanuel Archibald, Akeem Stewart, Noelex Holder, Revon Williams	39.89	
6	8	Cameroon	Claude Itoungue Bogognie, Emmanuel Eseme, Evariste Nana Kuate, Raphael Ngaguele Mberlina	40.04	
	1	Azerbaijan	Javid Mammadov, Alham Naghiyev, Rustam Mammadov, Nazim Babayev	DQ	TR24.7
	7	The Gambia		DNS	

=== 5000 metres walk ===
20 November

Rank	Name	Nationality	Time	Notes
1st place, gold medalist(s)	Ismail Benhammouda	Algeria	19:16.12	GR
2nd place, silver medalist(s)	Salih Korkmaz	Turkey	19:29.59	
3rd place, bronze medalist(s)	Mazlum Demir	Turkey	19:36.13	
4	Rasulbek Dilmurodov	Uzbekistan	20:12.20	
5	Georgiy Sheiko	Kazakhstan	20:24.86	
	Rayen Cherni	Tunisia	DQ	TR54.7.5

=== High jump ===
18 November

Rank	Name	Nationality	1.90	2.00	2.05	2.08	2.11	2.13	2.15	2.17	Result	Notes
1st place, gold medalist(s)	Amir Nagayev	Uzbekistan	–	o	o	o	xo	xo	o	xxx	2.15	
1st place, gold medalist(s)	Yasir Kuduban	Turkey	–	o	o	o	o	xx–	o	xxx	2.15	
3rd place, bronze medalist(s)	Fatak Bait Jaboob	Oman	–	o	o	o	o	o	xxx		2.13	
4	Sharoz Khan	Pakistan	o	o	xo	o	xxx				2.08	
5	Ahmed Mahmoud	Bahrain	o	o	xxx						2.00	
5	Abdulrahman Omar Sabar	Iraq	–	o	xxx						2.00	

=== Pole vault ===
17 November

Rank	Name	Nationality	4.50	4.80	5.10	5.20	5.25	5.45	5.65	5.76	Result	Notes
1st place, gold medalist(s)	Hussain Al-Hizam	Saudi Arabia	–	–	–	o	–	o	o	xxx	5.65	GR
2nd place, silver medalist(s)	Ameer Saihood	Iraq	–	o	o	–	xxx				5.10	
	Abdoul Mmadi	Comoros	xxx								NM	

=== Long jump ===
20 November

Rank	Name	Nationality	#1	#2	#3	#4	#5	#6	Result	Notes
1st place, gold medalist(s)	Anvar Anvarov	Uzbekistan	8.08	8.09	x	8.05	5.92	8.09	8.09	
2nd place, silver medalist(s)	Amath Faye	Senegal	7.33	x	7.71	7.57	7.86	x	7.86	
3rd place, bronze medalist(s)	Emanuel Archibald	Guyana	7.38	7.38	7.56	x	x	6.97	7.56	
4	Komi Bernard Konu	Togo	7.48	7.44	7.29	7.20	7.54	x	7.54	
5	Nazim Babayev	Azerbaijan	7.30	x	x	7.12	x	7.30	7.30	
6	Abdulrahman Mohammed	Saudi Arabia	6.84	x	x	6.64	7.14	x	7.14	
	Soumaïla Sabo	Burkina Faso							DNS	
	Bahtiyar Rozyyev	Turkmenistan							DNS	

=== Triple jump ===
18 November

Rank	Name	Nationality	#1	#2	#3	#4	#5	#6	Result	Notes
1st place, gold medalist(s)	Ibrokhim Mahkamov	Uzbekistan	16.16	16.65	15.56	16.32	14.59	16.74	16.74	
2nd place, silver medalist(s)	Soumaïla Sabo	Burkina Faso	14.70	16.05	16.63	–	x	15.21	16.63	
3rd place, bronze medalist(s)	Sami Bakheet	Saudi Arabia	x	16.09	15.92	16.39	15.72	16.50	16.50	
4	Amath Faye	Senegal	x	16.45	x	x	x	14.76	16.45	
5	Nazim Babayev	Azerbaijan	x	x	15.47	16.01	15.46	15.91	16.01	
6	Yoann Awhansou	Benin	15.45	x	x	15.67	15.88	x	15.88	
7	Rustam Mammadov	Azerbaijan	x	15.48	x	15.31	15.61	x	15.61	
8	Komi Bernard Konu	Togo	14.98	r					14.98	
9	Derick Chiambah Gama	Cameroon	14.36	x	14.38				14.38	
	Bahtiyar Rozyyev	Turkmenistan							DNS	

=== Shot put ===
18 November

Rank	Name	Nationality	#1	#2	#3	#4	#5	#6	Result	Notes
1st place, gold medalist(s)	Mohamed Magdi Hamza	Egypt	x	18.68	19.39	x	x	x	19.39	
2nd place, silver medalist(s)	Mohammad Reza Tayebi	Iran	18.67	19.35	19.35	x	x	19.06	19.35	
3rd place, bronze medalist(s)	Abdelrahman Mahmoud	Bahrain	18.65	18.50	18.71	x	x	x	18.71	
4	Djibrine Adoum Ahmat	Qatar	17.76	18.51	18.43	17.98	x	18.26	18.51	
5	Doston Rajabov	Uzbekistan	17.83	x	17.31	x	x	17.90	17.90	
6	Ismail Aliyev	Azerbaijan	x	17.21	x	16.91	16.77	x	17.21	
	Amanmyrat Hommadow	Turkmenistan							DNS	
	Tejen Hommadow	Turkmenistan							DNS	

=== Discus throw ===
20 November

Rank	Name	Nationality	#1	#2	#3	#4	#5	#6	Result	Notes
1st place, gold medalist(s)	Ömer Şahin	Turkey	56.27	53.22	58.92	51.64	55.88	54.09	58.92	
2nd place, silver medalist(s)	Essa Mohamed Al-Zenkawi	Kuwait	56.46	57.07	57.15	56.53	57.72	56.62	57.72	
3rd place, bronze medalist(s)	Mustafa Al-Saamah	Iraq	55.15	57.11	x	x	x	56.00	57.11	
4	Moaaz Mohamed Ibrahim	Qatar	55.59	54.49	56.90	54.68	56.18	56.77	56.90	
5	Abdullah Mohammad Al-Zankawi	Kuwait	55.87	x	56.04	54.15	56.19	x	56.19	
6	Lucien Wangba	Cameroon	x	53.22	x	51.08	x	x	53.22	
7	Yevgeniy Labutov	Kazakhstan	x	52.38	x	x	x	52.50	52.50	
	Sié Fahige Kambou	Burkina Faso							DNS	

=== Hammer throw ===
17 November

Rank	Name	Nationality	#1	#2	#3	#4	#5	#6	Result	Notes
1st place, gold medalist(s)	Halil Yılmazer	Turkey	x	70.98	71.40	73.33	74.70	74.59	74.70	
2nd place, silver medalist(s)	Sukhrob Khodyayev	Uzbekistan	73.04	71.38	74.44	68.78	73.31	73.10	74.44	
3rd place, bronze medalist(s)	Ayubkhon Fayezov	Uzbekistan	67.28	72.01	73.33	72.37	74.12	73.97	74.12	
4	Özkan Baltacı	Turkey	x	71.22	72.41	x	73.85	73.82	73.85	
5	Ashraf Amjad Al-Saifi	Qatar	69.46	x	70.26	71.59	69.70	71.07	71.59	
6	Ahmed Amjad Al-Saifi	Qatar	66.77	66.87	x	66.42	x	x	66.87	
7	Ahmed Tarek Ismail	Egypt	59.25	x	66.70	x	x	66.14	66.70	
8	Timur Diorditsa	Tajikistan	46.12	46.88	x	x	r		46.88	
	Mergen Mammedow	Turkmenistan							DNS	

=== Javelin throw ===
19 November

Rank	Name	Nationality	#1	#2	#3	#4	#5	#6	Result	Notes
1st place, gold medalist(s)	Arshad Nadeem	Pakistan	75.44	83.05	82.48	77.06	x	77.98	83.05	
2nd place, silver medalist(s)	Muhammad Yasir	Pakistan	70.32	74.43	72.82	73.78	71.79	76.04	76.04	
3rd place, bronze medalist(s)	Samuel Kure Adams	Nigeria	71.91	75.46	72.57	71.38	76.01	75.84	76.01	
4	Leslain Baird	Guyana	70.33	67.60	71.13	72.26	65.35	69.48	72.26	
5	Sarvar Ismoilov	Uzbekistan	68.69	70.86	68.98	x	69.66	72.05	72.05	
6	Abdulrahman Al-Azemi	Kuwait	69.54	67.19	67.28	62.47	63.06	x	69.54	
7	Saqer Rabeh Ali Abdulghani	Saudi Arabia	65.45	68.23	66.65	r			68.23	

=== Decathlon ===
17–18 November

The highest mark recorded in each event is highlighted in yellow

Rank	Athlete	Nationality	100m	LJ	SP	HJ	400m	110m H	DT	PV	JT	1500m	Points	Notes
1st place, gold medalist(s)	Nodir Norbaev	Uzbekistan	11.34	7.50	12.71	2.02	50.97	14.72	42.43	4.70	59.48	5:06.50	7633	
2nd place, silver medalist(s)	Zakhriddin Shokirov	Uzbekistan	11.34	7.42	13.97	2.02	51.92	15.02	44.31	4.60	49.27	5:03.21	7487	
3rd place, bronze medalist(s)	Dhiae Boudoumi	Algeria	11.06	7.55w	11.06	1.96	47.83	16.04	32.63	4.30	46.14	4:28.61	7259	
4	Mohsen Hassan Al-Dabbous	Saudi Arabia	11.40	6.94	13.01	1.75	49.52	15.02	34.28	4.40	41.68	5:48.32	6571	
	Haman Ghrairi	Iraq	11.53	6.73w	13.11	1.87	49.23	15.57	39.56	3.80	DNS	–	DNF	

== Women's results ==
=== 100 metres ===
Heats – 18 November
Wind:
Heat 1: 0.0 m/s, Heat 2: -0.7 m/s, Heat 3: +0.8 m/s

Rank	Heat	Name	Nationality	Time	Notes
1	1	Herverge Kole Etame	Cameroon	11.31	Q
2	3	Edidiong Odiong	Bahrain	11.36	Q
3	2	Keliza Smith	Guyana	11.62	Q
4	1	Chioma Cynthia Nweke	Nigeria	11.64	Q
5	2	Isatou Sey	The Gambia	11.67	Q
6	2	Simay Özçiftçi	Turkey	11.68	q
7	2	Iyanuoluwa Toyin Bada	Nigeria	11.71	q
8	1	Lamiya Valiyeva	Azerbaijan	11.75	
9	1	Hajar Al-Khaldi	Bahrain	11.85	
10	1	Lou Yonan Chantal Djehi	Ivory Coast	11.92	
11	3	Beyzanur Seylan	Turkey	12.01	Q
12	3	Nyimasata Jawneh	The Gambia	12.10	
13	2	Mudhawi Al-Shammari	Kuwait	12.12	
14	2	Laylo Allaberganova	Uzbekistan	12.16	
15	3	Saran Kouyaté	Guinea	12.19	
16	2	Sumaya Dewan	Bangladesh	12.50	
17	1	Aishath Shabaa Saleem	Maldives	12.97	
18	3	Marwa Saleem	Afghanistan	13.33	
	1	Enejan Esedova	Turkmenistan	DNS	
	3	Valentina Meredova	Turkmenistan	DNS	

Final – 18 November

Wind: +0.8 m/s

Rank	Lane	Name	Nationality	Time	Notes
1st place, gold medalist(s)	5	Edidiong Odiong	Bahrain	11.17	GR
2nd place, silver medalist(s)	4	Herverge Kole Etame	Cameroon	11.38	
3rd place, bronze medalist(s)	3	Keliza Smith	Guyana	11.59	
4	2	Isatou Sey	The Gambia	11.64	
5	6	Chioma Cynthia Nweke	Nigeria	11.69	
6	1	Simay Özçiftçi	Turkey	11.79	
7	8	Iyanuoluwa Toyin Bada	Nigeria	11.81	
8	7	Beyzanur Seylan	Turkey	12.08	

=== 200 metres ===
Heats – 20 November
Wind:
Heat 1: +1.2 m/s, Heat 2: NWI, Heat 3: +0.1 m/s

Rank	Heat	Name	Nationality	Time	Notes
1	2	Herverge Kole Etame	Cameroon	23.34	Q
2	1	Anita Enaruna	Nigeria	23.36	Q
3	2	Isatou Sey	The Gambia	23.48	Q
4	3	Edidiong Odiong	Bahrain	23.55	Q
5	1	Lamiya Valiyeva	Azerbaijan	23.81	Q
6	1	Salwa Eid Naser	Bahrain	23.82	q
7	3	Sara El Hachimi	Morocco	23.89	Q
8	2	Maria Thompson Omokwe	Nigeria	23.94	q
9	3	Keliza Smith	Guyana	24.02	
10	2	Kenisha Phillips	Guyana	24.18	
11	1	Jalika Bajinka	The Gambia	24.28	
12	1	Viktoriya An	Kazakhstan	24.55	
13	3	Jonbibi Hukmova	Uzbekistan	24.60	
14	3	Lou Yonan Chantal Djehi	Ivory Coast	24.84	
15	3	Malvine Akwenyi	Uganda	25.08	
16	2	Mudhawi Al-Shammari	Kuwait	25.30	
17	3	Esther Mayadjim Mingueyam	Chad	25.73	
	1	Saran Hadja Kouyaté	Guinea	DNS	
	1	Enejan Esedova	Turkmenistan	DNS	
	2	Valentina Meredova	Turkmenistan	DNS	

Final – 20 November

Wind: +0.7 m/s

Rank	Lane	Name	Nationality	Time	Notes
1st place, gold medalist(s)	7	Edidiong Odiong	Bahrain	22.99	
2nd place, silver medalist(s)	2	Salwa Eid Naser	Bahrain	23.52	
3rd place, bronze medalist(s)	5	Herverge Kole Etame	Cameroon	23.60	
4	4	Isatou Sey	The Gambia	23.72	
5	8	Sara El Hachimi	Morocco	23.99	
6	6	Anita Enaruna	Nigeria	24.03	
7	3	Lamiya Valiyeva	Azerbaijan	24.11	
8	1	Maria Thompson Omokwe	Nigeria	24.46	

=== 400 metres ===
Heats – 18 November

Rank	Heat	Name	Nationality	Time	Notes
1	1	Salwa Eid Naser	Bahrain	52.13	Q
2	2	Leni Shida	Uganda	52.47	Q
3	2	Houda Nouiri	Morocco	52.72	Q
4	1	Patience Okon George	Nigeria	52.91	Q
5	2	Aliyah Abrams	Guyana	53.01	Q
6	2	Sila Koloğlu	Turkey	53.16	q
7	1	Salma Lehlali	Morocco	53.26	Q
8	1	Samira Awali Boubacar	Niger	53.34	q
9	2	Aminat Kamarudeen	United Arab Emirates	53.38	
10	2	Zenab Mahamat	Bahrain	53.85	
11	1	Maureen Banura	Uganda	54.78	
12	1	Jonbibi Hukmova	Uzbekistan	54.99	
13	2	Esther Mayadjim Mingueyam	Chad	56.30	
14	1	Blague Ache	Chad	57.54	
		Alexandra Zalyubovskaya	Kazakhstan	DQ	TR16.7.1

Final – 19 November

Rank	Lane	Name	Nationality	Time	Notes
1st place, gold medalist(s)	6	Salwa Eid Naser	Bahrain	51.59	
2nd place, silver medalist(s)	7	Patience Okon George	Nigeria	51.93	
3rd place, bronze medalist(s)	4	Leni Shida	Uganda	52.72	
4	3	Salma Lehlali	Morocco	52.83	PB
5	5	Houda Nouiri	Morocco	53.19	
6	8	Aliyah Abrams	Guyana	53.76	
7	1	Samira Awali Boubacar	Niger	54.21	
	2	Sila Koloğlu	Turkey	DQ	TR17.2.3

=== 800 metres ===
19 November

Rank	Name	Nationality	Time	Notes
1st place, gold medalist(s)	Nelly Jepkosgei	Bahrain	2:02.59	
2nd place, silver medalist(s)	Halimah Nakaayi	Uganda	2:03.14	
3rd place, bronze medalist(s)	Soukaina Hajji	Morocco	2:04.34	
4	Odette Sawekoua	Benin	2:06.44	
5	Sabokhat Samiyonova	Uzbekistan	2:14.46	
6	Haneen Yaqoub	Palestine	2:23.53	
	Amal Al-Roumi	Kuwait	DNF	

=== 1500 metres ===
20 November

Rank	Name	Nationality	Time	Notes
1st place, gold medalist(s)	Nelly Jepkosgei	Bahrain	4:21.56	
2nd place, silver medalist(s)	Soukaina Hajji	Morocco	4:22.77	
3rd place, bronze medalist(s)	Bahiya El Arfaoui	Morocco	4:23.11	
4	Knight Aciru	Uganda	4:24.97	
5	Kadra Mohamed Dembil	Djibouti	4:31.55	
6	Ainuska Kalil kyzy	Kyrgyzstan	4:33.84	
7	Sabokhat Samiyonova	Uzbekistan	4:41.17	
	Halimah Nakaayi	Uganda	DNS	

=== 5000 metres ===
19 November

Rank	Name	Nationality	Time	Notes
1st place, gold medalist(s)	Winfred Yavi	Bahrain	15:43.51	
2nd place, silver medalist(s)	Charity Cherop	Uganda	15:47.01	
3rd place, bronze medalist(s)	Samiyah Hassan Nour	Djibouti	15:48.28	
4	Kadra Mohamed Dembil	Djibouti	15:57.82	
5	Risper Cherop	Uganda	16:23.30	
6	Edibe Yağız	Turkey	16:40.34	
	Hanoia Hasaballa	Sudan	DNS	

=== 10,000 metres ===
17 November

Rank	Name	Nationality	Time	Notes
1st place, gold medalist(s)	Rebecca Chelangat	Uganda	32:11.42	
2nd place, silver medalist(s)	Violah Jepchumba	Bahrain	32:13.59	
3rd place, bronze medalist(s)	Samiya Hassan Nour	Djibouti	32:17.72	
4	Annet Chemengich Chelangat	Uganda	32:51.33	
5	Ruth Jebet	Bahrain	33:10.63	
6	Bahar Yıldırım	Turkey	33:38.38	
7	Ainuska Kalil kyzy	Kyrgyzstan	34:17.61	
	Habon Ahmed Djama	Djibouti	DNF	

=== 100 metres hurdles ===
19 November
Wind: +1.1 m/s

Rank	Lane	Name	Nationality	Time	Notes
1st place, gold medalist(s)	4	Cansu Nimet Sayin	Turkey	13.54	=GR
2nd place, silver medalist(s)	5	Lidiya Podsepkina	Uzbekistan	13.56	
3rd place, bronze medalist(s)	3	Naomi Akakpo	Togo	13.65	

=== 400 metres hurdles ===
18 November

Rank	Lane	Name	Nationality	Time	Notes
1st place, gold medalist(s)	5	Kemi Adekoya	Bahrain	56.33	
2nd place, silver medalist(s)	6	Mariam Kareem	United Arab Emirates	57.42	NR
3rd place, bronze medalist(s)	4	Linda Angounou	Cameroon	58.24	
4	3	Adelina Zems	Kazakhstan	58.67	
5	7	Nurkhon Ochilova	Uzbekistan	58.87	

=== 3000 metres steeplechase ===
18 November

Rank	Name	Nationality	Time	Notes
1st place, gold medalist(s)	Winfred Yavi	Bahrain	9:40.65	
2nd place, silver medalist(s)	Tuğba Güvenç Yenigün	Turkey	9:57.05	
3rd place, bronze medalist(s)	Ikram Ouaaziz	Morocco	10:00.55	
4	Dilshoda Usmanova	Uzbekistan	10:22.21	

=== 4 × 100 metres relay ===
19 November

Rank	Lane	Nation	Competitors	Time	Notes
1st place, gold medalist(s)	4	Nigeria	Iyanuloluwa Bada, Miracle Ezechukwu, Maria Thompson Omokwe, Nweke Chioma	44.27	
2nd place, silver medalist(s)	3	Bahrain	Layla Kamal, Edidiong Odiong, Raihanah Garoubah, Hajar Al-Khaldi	44.47	
3rd place, bronze medalist(s)	2	The Gambia	Mariama Camara, Jawneh Nyimasata, Jalika Bajinka, Isatou Sey	45.05	
4	5	Turkey	Nimet Sayın, Sıla Koloğlu, Simay Özçiftçi, Beyzanur Seylan	45.12	
5	6	Uzbekistan	Lydiya Podsepkina, Laylo Allaberganova, Nurkhon Ochilova, Jonbibi Hukmova	46.09	

=== High jump ===
17 November

Rank	Name	Nationality	1.60	1.66	1.72	1.77	1.81	1.84	1.86	Result	Notes
1st place, gold medalist(s)	Barnokhon Sayfullayeva	Uzbekistan	–	–	–	o	o	xo	xxx	1.84	
2nd place, silver medalist(s)	Fatoumata Balley	Guinea	–	–	–	o	o	xxo	xxx	1.84	
3rd place, bronze medalist(s)	Valeriya Gorbatova	Uzbekistan	–	–	xxo	xo	o	xxx		1.81	
4	Irina Sizova	Kazakhstan	o	o	xo	xxo	xxx			1.77	
5	Most Ritu Akhtar	Bangladesh	o	o	o	xxx				1.72	

=== Pole vault ===
19 November

Rank	Name	Nationality	3.67	3.74	3.81	3.86	3.91	3.96	4.01	4.06	4.20	Result	Notes
1st place, gold medalist(s)	Demet Parlak	Turkey	–	–	o	–	o	o	o	xo	xxx	4.06	
2nd place, silver medalist(s)	Buse Arıkazan	Turkey	–	o	–	o	xo	xo	xo	xxx		4.01	
3rd place, bronze medalist(s)	Mahsa Mirzatabibi	Iran	xo	o	–	xxo	xxx					3.86	
4	Dina Ahmed Eltabaa	Egypt	xo	xxx								3.67	

=== Long jump ===
19 November

Rank	Name	Nationality	#1	#2	#3	#4	#5	#6	Result	Notes
1st place, gold medalist(s)	Esraa Owis	Egypt	x	6.55	x	x	4.89	4.11	6.55	GR
2nd place, silver medalist(s)	Nemata Nikiema	Burkina Faso	6.17	x	6.02	6.28	6.37	5.70	6.37	
3rd place, bronze medalist(s)	Fayza Issaka Abdoukerim	Togo	5.55	6.05	x	x	5.86	5.77	6.05	
4	Sharifa Davronova	Uzbekistan	5.86	6.04	x	6.02	5.51	x	6.04	
5	Richalda Mohamed	Comoros	5.61	5.81	5.64	5.65	5.55	5.36	5.81	
6	Roksana Khudoyarova	Uzbekistan	5.74	x	x	x	x	5.53	5.74	
7	Véronique Kossenda Rey	Cameroon	x	5.44	5.64	x	5.67	5.54	5.67	
8	Aisha Al-Kheder	Kuwait	x	x	5.56	x	x	5.56	5.56	
9	Serreh Sanneh	The Gambia	x	5.07	5.35				5.35	

=== Triple jump ===
17 November

Rank	Name	Nationality	#1	#2	#3	#4	#5	#6	Result	Notes
1st place, gold medalist(s)	Saly Sarr	Senegal	14.36	14.17	14.44	14.52	x	14.09	14.52	GR
2nd place, silver medalist(s)	Sharifa Davronova	Uzbekistan	13.91	x	13.44	x	x	x	13.91	
3rd place, bronze medalist(s)	Yekaterina Sariyeva	Azerbaijan	x	13.50	13.84	13.69	x	x	13.84	
4	Roksana Khudoyarova	Uzbekistan	12.87	13.42	13.04	13.33	13.49	13.44	13.49	
5	Natricia Hooper	Guyana	12.81	13.38	13.01	x	12.91	13.25	13.38	
6	Anne-Suzanna Fosther-Katta	Cameroon	12.59	13.01	12.96	13.26	11.66	x	13.26	
7	Véronique Kossenda Rey	Cameroon	12.98	x	x	13.16	12.87	12.74	13.16	
8	Fayza Issaka Abdoukerim	Togo	x	12.99	12.91	13.09	12.59	12.86	13.09	
9	Richalda Mohamed	Comoros	12.20	x	12.57				12.57	
	Amelia Pinga	Mozambique							DNS	
	Esraa Owis	Egypt							DNS	

=== Shot put ===
20 November

Rank	Name	Nationality	#1	#2	#3	#4	#5	#6	Result	Notes
1st place, gold medalist(s)	Emel Dereli	Turkey	16.05	x	16.09	x	x	x	16.09	
2nd place, silver medalist(s)	Oyesade Olatoye	Nigeria	15.53	15.96	15.28	15.89	15.86	16.05	16.05	
3rd place, bronze medalist(s)	Noora Salem Jasim	Bahrain	15.14	x	15.44	x	x	15.35	15.44	
4	Nora Monie	Cameroon	9.42	13.69	14.30	14.34	13.44	13.83	14.34	

=== Discus throw ===
17 November

Rank	Name	Nationality	#1	#2	#3	#4	#5	#6	Result	Notes
1st place, gold medalist(s)	Nora Monie	Cameroon	56.30	55.86	53.47	55.77	57.04	53.31	57.04	GR
2nd place, silver medalist(s)	Obiageri Amaechi	Nigeria	51.51	55.97	x	54.27	56.99	52.41	56.99	
3rd place, bronze medalist(s)	Özlem Becerek	Turkey	55.56	x	x	54.93	50.86	53.93	55.56	
4	Chioma Onyekwere	Nigeria	52.37	x	x	52.45	55.08	x	55.08	
5	Salem Rijaj Essayah	Libya	48.26	x	49.61	49.21	48.16	49.95	49.95	
6	Mahla Mahroghi	Iran	46.00	x	49.59	x	x	47.22	49.59	
7	Noora Salem Jasim	Bahrain	38.64	42.91	x	x	x	x	42.91	

=== Hammer throw ===
18 November

Rank	Name	Nationality	#1	#2	#3	#4	#5	#6	Result	Notes
1st place, gold medalist(s)	Zahra Tatar	Algeria	x	x	60.12	62.46	63.55	59.71	63.55	
2nd place, silver medalist(s)	Oyesade Olatoye	Nigeria	60.58	61.91	63.34	63.30	x	x	63.34	
3rd place, bronze medalist(s)	Zarina Nosirshonova	Uzbekistan	x	59.42	60.79	59.71	61.29	61.69	61.69	
4	Deniz Yaylacı	Turkey	54.01	56.83	54.60	57.95	56.63	x	57.95	
5	Nora Monie	Cameroon	x	29.00	r				29.00	

=== Javelin throw ===
17 November

Rank	Name	Nationality	#1	#2	#3	#4	#5	#6	Result	Notes
1st place, gold medalist(s)	Nargiza Kuchkarova	Uzbekistan	x	56.41	55.32	54.84	59.39	54.99	59.39	
2nd place, silver medalist(s)	Esra Türkmen	Turkey	55.27	x	52.96	55.68	56.19	x	56.19	
3rd place, bronze medalist(s)	Eda Tuğsuz	Turkey	55.58	x	x	x	55.02	53.69	55.58	
4	Zahra Najafi	Iran	48.74	47.37	47.10	x	x	51.30	51.30	
5	Sherine Shaaban Hussein	Egypt	46.65	47.72	x	45.99	45.62	46.46	47.72	
6	Josephine Lalam	Uganda	43.66	x	r				43.66	

=== Heptathlon ===
19–20 November

The highest mark recorded in each event is highlighted in yellow

Rank	Athlete	Nationality	100m H	HJ	SP	200m	LJ	JT	800m	Points	Notes
1st place, gold medalist(s)	Fatemeh Mohitizadeh	Iran	13.95	1.68	11.93	25.40	6.12	34.28	2:22.02	5562	GR
2nd place, silver medalist(s)	Ugiloy Norboyeva	Uzbekistan	14.29	1.71	11.91	26.77	5.50	50.32	2:26.98	5488	
3rd place, bronze medalist(s)	Irina Konichsheva	Kazakhstan	14.40	1.68	12.39	25.89	4.81	42.15	2:21.26	5270	
4	Saba Khorasani	Iran	14.30	1.65	11.12	25.47	5.57	32.62	2:23.19	5205	

== Mixed ==
=== 4 × 400 metres relay ===
20 November

Rank	Lane	Nation	Competitors	Time	Notes
1st place, gold medalist(s)	5	Nigeria	Gafari Badmus, Anita Enaruna, Ezekiel Eno Asuquo, Patience Okon George	3:16.27	GR
2nd place, silver medalist(s)	2	Bahrain	Moussa Ali Issa, Kemi Adekoya, Alaa Sami, Salwa Eid Naser	3:17.28	
3rd place, bronze medalist(s)	6	Turkey	İsmail Nezir, Simay Özçiftçi, Berke Akçam, Sila Koloğlu	3:17.73	
4	7	United Arab Emirates	Suleiman Abdulrahman, Aminat Kamarudeen, Emmanuel Bamidele, Mariam Kareem	3:17.94	NR
5	1	Morocco	Rachid Mhamdi, Houda Nouiri, Mohamed Yassine Zerhoum, Salma Lehlali	3:19.44	NR
6	4	Guyana	Revon Williams, Kenisha Phillips, Simeon Adams, Aliyah Abrams	3:23.97	
7	3	Uzbekistan	Hasanbek Rustamjonov, Jonbibi Hukmova, Abbos Toshtemirov, Laylo Allaberganova	3:27.79	NR
8	8	Azerbaijan	Nihat Taghiyev, Ilaha Guliyeva, Javid Mammadov, Lamiya Valiyeva	3:38.55	

== Para athletics ==
=== Men's Shot Put F57 ===
Rank	Athlete	Result
1st place, gold medalist(s)	Yasin Khosravi (IRI)	15.65
2nd place, silver medalist(s)	Mohammad Khalvandi (TUR)	14.45
3rd place, bronze medalist(s)	Hamid Haydari (TUR)	13.93
4	Samir Nabiyev (AZE)	13.85
5	Haidr Salamh (KSA)	13.84
6	Yorkinbek Odilov (UZB)	12.47
7	Hussein Khazaee (IRQ)	12.42
8	Lekezo Idriss (CMR)	12.17
9	Mahmoud Rajab (LBA)	12.06
10	Mohamed Ouchene (ALG)	9.69
11	Marcel Ferry Souty (CMR)	9.51
