= Turkmenistan at the Islamic Solidarity Games =

- IOC code: TKM
- NOC: NOCT
- Medals Ranked 18th: Gold 7 Silver 11 Bronze 28 Total 46

Islamic Solidarity Games appearances (overview)
- 2005; 2013; 2017; 2021; 2025

Turkmenistan has competed at every celebration of the Islamic Solidarity Games since the first edition in Mecca. As of the last tournament held in 2021 in Konya, Turkey, the Turkmen athletes have won a total of 46 medals (7 gold, 11 silver, and 28 bronze). Most medals won in a tournament was 23 medals in 2021 Islamic Solidarity Games, and most gold medal earned in an Edition was 4 gold as well in 2021 Islamic Solidarity Games.

== Medal tables ==
=== Medals by Islamic Solidarity Games ===
Host nation

Below the table representing all Turkmen medals in the games. Till now, Turkmenistan has won 46 medals of which 7 gold, 11 silver, and 28 bronze.

Games	Athletes	Gold	Silver	Bronze	Total	Rank	Notes	RF
(Saudi Arabia) 2005 Mecca		1	1	4	6	17	details	
(Iran) 2010 Tehran	Canceled							
(Indonesia) 2013 Palembang		0	0	4	4	24	details	
(Azerbaijan) 2017 Baku		2	4	7	13	15	details	
(Turkey) 2021 Konya		4	6	13	23	12	details	
(Saudi Arabia) 2025 Riyadh	1	0	0	0	0	0	details	
(Malaysia) 2029 Selangor	Future event							
Total		7	11	28	46	18th	―	―

== See also ==
- Turkmenistan at the Olympics
- Turkmenistan at the Paralympics
- Turkmenistan at the Asian Games
- Sports in Turkmenistan
