= Amina Dehhaoui =

Moroccan taekwondo practitioner)

Personal information
- Nationality: Moroccan

Sport
- Sport: Taekwondo
- Weight class: 57 kg
Medal record
Women's taekwondo
Representing Morocco
Mediterranean Games
Silver medal – second place	2026 Taranto	57 kg
Islamic Solidarity Games
Gold medal – first place	2025 Riyadh	57 kg
World U21 Championships
Gold medal – first place	2025 Nairobi	57 kg
World Junior Championships
Gold medal – first place	2024 Chuncheon	55 kg

Amina Dehhaoui is a Moroccan taekwondo practitioner.

== Career ==
Dehhaoui competed at the 2024 World Taekwondo Junior Championships and won a gold medal in the 55 kg category. She was subsequently named the Moroccan sportswomen of the year by the Société Nationale de Radiodiffusion et de Télévision (SNRT).

In November 2025, she competed at the 2025 Islamic Solidarity Games and won a gold medal in the 57 kg category, defeating Hatice Kübra İlgün in the finals. The next month she competed at the 2025 World U21 Taekwondo Championships and won a gold medal in the 57 kg category.
