= Cansu Nimet Sayın =

Turkish hurdler (born 2003)

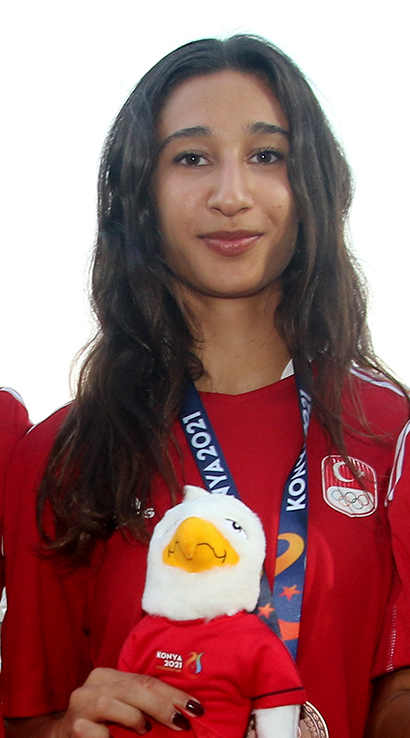

Personal information
- Born: 13 August 2003 (age 22) Turkey

Sport
- Country: Turkey
- Event: 100 m hurdles
Medal record
Women's athletics
Representing Turkey
Islamic Solidarity Games
Gold medal – first place	2025 Riyadh	100 m hurdles

Cansu Nimet Sayın (born 13 August 2003) is a Turkish spint hurdler.

== Sport career ==
Sayın is a member of Enka SK.

She competed in the 100 m hurdles and 4 × 100 m relay events at the 2023 European Athletics U23 Championships in Espoo, Finland without achieving success.

She was eliminated in the heat of the 100 m hurdles event at the 2025 European Athletics U23 Championships in Bergen, Norway.

At the 2025 Summer World University Game in Bochum, Germany, she was eliminated in the semifinals of the 100 m hurdles.

She competed at the 2025 Islamic Solidarity Games in Riyadh, Saudi Arabia, and won the gold medal in the 100 m hurdles event.

== Personal life ==
Cansu Nimet Sayın was born on 13 August 2003.

She studied in the Faculty of Sports science at Marmara University in Istanbul.
