= Albania at the Islamic Solidarity Games =

- IOC code: ALB
- NOC: ANOC
- Medals Ranked 43rd: Gold 0 Silver 3 Bronze 0 Total 3

Islamic Solidarity Games appearances (overview)
- 2005; 2013; 2017; 2021; 2025

Albania has participated in the Islamic Solidarity Games since the fourth edition, held in 2017 in Baku. The country won its first medal in the history of the Games at the 2021 edition, when wrestler Zelimkhan Abakarov claimed a medal in the Men's freestyle 65 kg category.

Albania achieved its best performance to date at the 2025 Islamic Solidarity Games in Riyadh, where weightlifter Enkileda Carja won two silver medals in the Women's 63 kg category, one in the Snatch and another in the Clean & Jerk. With these results, Albania's overall medal tally at the Islamic Solidarity Games increased to three silver medals, placing the country 43rd in the all-time medal table.

== Medal tables ==
=== Medals by Islamic Solidarity Games ===
Host nation

Below the table representing all Albanian medals around the games. Till now, Albania won three silver medal.

Games	Athletes	Gold	Silver	Bronze	Total	Rank	Notes	RF
(Saudi Arabia) 2005 Mecca	Did Not Compete							
(Iran) 2010 Tehran	Canceled							
(Indonesia) 2013 Palembang	Did Not Compete							
(Azerbaijan) 2017 Baku		0	0	0	0	–	details	
(Turkey) 2021 Konya		0	1	0	1	36th	details	
(Saudi Arabia) 2025 Riyadh	10	0	2	0	2	30th	details	
(Malaysia) 2029 Selangor	Future event							
Total		0	3	0	3	43rd	–	–

== See also ==
- Albania at the Olympics
- Albania at the Paralympics
- Albania at the Youth Olympics
- Albania at the European Games
- Albania at the Mediterranean Games
- Sports in Albania
