= Benin at the 2025 Islamic Solidarity Games =

- IOC code: BEN
- NOC: Benin National Olympic and Sports Committee

in Riyadh, Saudi Arabia
- Competitors: 9 in 4 sports
- Medals: Gold 0 Silver 0 Bronze 0 Total 0

Islamic Solidarity Games appearances
- 2005; 2013; 2017; 2021; 2025

Benin is scheduled to compete at the 2025 Islamic Solidarity Games to be held from 7 to 21 November 2025 in Riyadh, Saudi Arabia.

== Competitors ==
Sport	Men	Women	Total
Athletics	1	2	3
Camel racing	2	0	2
Karate	2	0	2
Swimming	1	1	2
Total	6	3	9

== Athletics ==
Benin sent three athletes to the Games, but Odile Ahouanwanou didn't compete at the competition.

Key

- Note–Ranks given for track events are within the athlete's heat only
- Q = Qualified for the next round
- q = Qualified for the next round as a fastest loser or, in field events, by position without achieving the qualifying target
- NR = National record
- N/A = Round not applicable for the event
- Bye = Athlete not required to compete in round

Men
Field events

Athlete	Event	Qualification		Final	
Athlete	Event	Distance	Position	Distance	Position
Yoann Awhansou	Triple jump	—N/a		15.88	6

Women

Track & road events

Athlete	Event	Heat		Semifinal		Final	
Athlete	Event	Result	Rank	Result	Rank	Result	Rank
Odette Sawekoua	800 m	—N/a				2:06.44	4
