= Athletics at the Islamic Solidarity Games =

Athletics is one of the sports at the quadrennial Islamic Solidarity Games competition. Athletics competitions was inaugurated since the first edition in 2005.

== Editions ==
Games	Year	Host city	Host country	Events
I	2005	Mecca	Saudi Arabia	23
II	2010	Tehran	Iran	Cancelled
III	2013	Palembang	Indonesia	40
IV	2017	Baku	Azerbaijan	40+14
V	2021	Konya	Turkey	41+2
VI	2025	Riyadh	Saudi Arabia	42+9

== Games records ==
Key: Defunct event

=== Men ===
Event	Record	Athlete	Nationality	Date	Games	Place	Ref.
100 m	10.06 (+0.6 m/s)	Ramil Guliyev	Turkey	16 May 2017	2017 Games	Baku, Azerbaijan	
200 m	20.08 (+0.6 m/s)	Ramil Guliyev	Turkey	18 May 2017	2017 Games	Baku, Azerbaijan	
400 m	44.93	Nagmeldin Ali Abubakr	Sudan	14 April 2005	2005 Games	Mecca, Saudi Arabia	
800 m	1:43.86	Abdulaziz Ladan	Saudi Arabia	September 2013	2013 Games	Palembang, Indonesia	
1500 m	3:36.64	Sadik Mikhou	Bahrain	20 May 2017	2017 Games	Baku, Azerbaijan	
5000 m	13:27.64	Younès Essalhi	Morocco	16 May 2017	2017 Games	Baku, Azerbaijan	
10,000 m	27:38.76	Abraham Cheroben	Bahrain	20 May 2017	2017 Games	Baku, Azerbaijan	
Marathon	2:16:28	Zäid Laâroussi	Morocco	15 April 2005	2005 Games	Mecca, Saudi Arabia	
110 m hurdles	13.62 (+0.6 m/s)	Yaqoub Al-Youha	Kuwait	20 November 2025	2025 Games	Riyadh, Saudi Arabia	
400 m hurdles	49.22	Berke Akçam	Turkey	18 November 2025	2025 Games	Riyadh, Saudi Arabia	
3000 m steeplechase	8:26.26	Mohamed Tindouf	Morocco	18 May 2017	2017 Games	Baku, Azerbaijan	
High jump	2.28 m	Majededdin Ghazal	Syria	19 May 2017	2017 Games	Baku, Azerbaijan	
Pole vault	5.65 m	Hussain Al-Hizam	Saudi Arabia	17 November 2025	2025 Games	Riyadh, Saudi Arabia	
Long jump	8.44 m AR	Mohamed Al-Khuwalidi	Saudi Arabia	13 April 2005	2005 Games	Mecca, Saudi Arabia	
Triple jump	17.15 m (±0.0 m/s)	Nazim Babayev	Azerbaijan	17 May 2017	2017 Games	Baku, Azerbaijan	
Shot put	20.46 m A	Alperen Karahan	Turkey	8 August 2022	2021 Games	Konya, Turkey	
Discus throw	66.03 m	Ehsan Haddadi	Iran	September 2013	2013 Games	Palembang, Indonesia	
Hammer throw	77.73 m	Mostafa El-Gamal	Egypt	September 2013	2013 Games	Palembang, Indonesia	
Javelin throw	88.55 m A	Arshad Nadeem	Pakistan	12 August 2022	2021 Games	Konya, Turkey	
Decathlon	7010 pts	Moulay Rachid Alaoui Hakim	Morocco	14–15 April 2005	2005 Games	Mecca, Saudi Arabia	
Decathlon	100m / Long jump / Shot put / High jump / 400m / 110m H / Discus / Pole vault / Javelin / 1500m						
5000 m walk (track)	19:16.12	Ismail Benhammouda	Algeria	20 November 2025	2025 Games	Riyadh, Saudi Arabia	
20 km walk (road)	1:30:48	Hassanine Sebei	Tunisia	12 April 2005	2005 Games	Mecca, Saudi Arabia	
4 × 100 m relay	38.74 A	Emre Zafer Barnes; Jak Ali Harvey; Kayhan Özer; Ramil Guliyev	Turkey	12 August 2022	2021 Games	Konya, Turkey	
4 × 400 m relay	3:03.70	Ismail Al-Sabiani; Mohammed Al-Bishi; Mazen Al-Yasen; Yousef Masrahi	Saudi Arabia	September 2013	2013 Games	Palembang, Indonesia	

=== Women ===
Event	Record	Athlete	Nationality	Date	Games	Place	Ref.
100 m	11.17 (+0.8 m/s)	Edidiong Odiong	Bahrain	18 November 2025	2025 Games	Riyadh, Saudi Arabia	
200 m	22.95 (+1.7 m/s)	Edidiong Odiong	Bahrain	18 May 2017	2017 Games	Baku, Azerbaijan	
400 m	51.33	Salwa Eid Naser	Bahrain	19 May 2017	2017 Games	Baku, Azerbaijan	
800 m	2:01.04	Malika Akkaoui	Morocco	17 May 2017	2017 Games	Baku, Azerbaijan	
1500 m	4:14.35 A	Winfred Yavi	Bahrain	12 August 2022	2021 Games	Konya, Turkey	
5000 m	14:53.41	Ruth Jebet	Bahrain	18 May 2017	2017 Games	Baku, Azerbaijan	
10,000 m	31:18.20	Yasemin Can	Turkey	20 May 2017	2017 Games	Baku, Azerbaijan	
100 m hurdles	13.54 (+0.7 m/s)	Dedeh Erawati	Indonesia	September 2013	2013 Games	Palembang, Indonesia	
100 m hurdles	13.54 (+1.1 m/s)	Cansu Nimet Sayın	Turkey	19 November 2025	2025 Games	Riyadh, Saudi Arabia	
400 m hurdles	54.68	Oluwakemi Adekoya	Bahrain	17 May 2017	2017 Games	Baku, Azerbaijan	
3000 m steeplechase	9:15.41	Ruth Jebet	Bahrain	17 May 2017	2017 Games	Baku, Azerbaijan	
High jump	1.97 m A	Safina Sadullayeva	Uzbekistan	11 August 2022	2021 Games	Konya, Turkey	
Pole vault	4.15 m	Buse Arıkazan	Turkey	17 May 2017	2017 Games	Baku, Azerbaijan	
Long jump	6.55 m (−0.4 m/s)	Esraa Owis	Egypt	19 November 2025	2025 Games	Riyadh, Saudi Arabia	
Triple jump	14.52 m (+0.2 m/s)	Saly Sarr	Senegal	17 November 2025	2025 Games	Riyadh, Saudi Arabia	
Shot put	17.75 m	Auriol Dongmo Mekemnang	Cameroon	17 May 2017	2017 Games	Baku, Azerbaijan	
Discus throw	57.04 m	Nora Monie	Cameroon	17 November 2025	2025 Games	Riyadh, Saudi Arabia	
Hammer throw	75.29 m NR	Hanna Skydan	Azerbaijan	16 May 2017	2017 Games	Baku, Azerbaijan	
Javelin throw	67.21 m NR	Eda Tuğsuz	Turkey	18 May 2017	2017 Games	Baku, Azerbaijan	
Heptathlon	5562 pts	Fatemeh Mohitizadeh	Iran	19–20 November 2025	2025 Games	Riyadh, Saudi Arabia	
Heptathlon	100m H / High jump / Shot put / 200m / Long jump / Javelin / 800m; 13.95 (−0.1 m/s) / 1.68 m / 11.93 m / 25.40 (+0.9 m/s) / 6.12 m (−1.0 m/s) / 34.28 m / 2:22.02						
4 × 100 m relay	43.83 A	Ola Buwaro; Wurrie Njadoe; Maimuna Jallow; Gina Bass	Gambia	12 August 2022	2021 Games	Konya, Turkey	
4 × 400 m relay	3:32.96	Salwa Eid Naser; Edidiong Odiong; Aminat Yusuf Jamal; Kemi Adekoya	Bahrain	20 May 2017	2017 Games	Baku, Azerbaijan	

=== Mixed ===
Event	Record	Athlete	Nationality	Date	Games	Place	Ref.
4 × 400 m relay	3:16.27	Gafari Badmus; Anita Enaruna; Ezekiel Eno Asuquo; Patience Okon George	Nigeria	20 November 2025	2025 Games	Riyadh, Saudi Arabia	
