= Turkmenistan at the 2025 Islamic Solidarity Games =

- IOC code: TKM
- NOC: National Olympic Committee of Turkmenistan

in Riyadh, Saudi Arabia
- Competitors: 1 in 1 sport
- Medals Ranked 0th: Gold 0 Silver 0 Bronze 0 Total 0

Islamic Solidarity Games appearances (overview)
- 2005; 2013; 2017; 2021; 2025

Turkmenistan was scheduled to compete at the 2025 Islamic Solidarity Games, which were held from 7 to 21 November 2025 in Riyadh, Saudi Arabia, but later withdrew all but one participant.

== Competitor ==
David Akopyan was the sole representative for Turkmenistan at the Games. He competed in the Men's 50m Butterfly, 100m Butterfly, and 200m Individual Medley. David performed well enough in the 50m Butterfly Heat to make it to the Semi-Finals, where he finished last.

== Withdrawn competitors ==
Turkmenistan withdrew 65 of its 66 competitors.

| Sport | Men | Women | Total |
|---|---|---|---|
| Athletics | 2 | 0 | 2 |
| Boxing | 4 | 0 | 4 |
| Karate | 6 | 6 | 12 |
| Muaythai | 5 | 3 | 8 |
| Para Powerlifting | 0 | 1 | 1 |
| Swimming | 1 | 2 | 3 |
| Volleyball | 12 | 0 | 12 |
| Weightlifting | 6 | 5 | 11 |
| Wrestling | 12 | 0 | 12 |
| Total | 48 | 17 | 65 |
