= Taekwondo at the 2025 Islamic Solidarity Games =

- Venue: Boulevard City 1
- Dates: 15—17 November 2025
- Competitors: 140 from 34 nations

The taekwondo tournament at the 2025 Islamic Solidarity Games in Riyadh was held between 15—17 November 2025. The taekwondo competition took place at Boulevard City 1 in Saudi Arabia.

== Medal table ==
* Host nation (Saudi Arabia)

Rank	Nation	Gold	Silver	Bronze	Total
1	Uzbekistan	3	2	2	7
2	Morocco	3	0	2	5
3	Iran	2	2	4	8
4	Jordan	2	0	3	5
5	Turkey	1	4	3	8
6	Saudi Arabia*	1	1	0	2
7	Kazakhstan	0	1	2	3
8	Azerbaijan	0	1	1	2
9	Afghanistan	0	1	0	1
10	Egypt	0	0	2	2
10	Tunisia	0	0	2	2
12	Ivory Coast	0	0	1	1
12	Niger	0	0	1	1
12	Nigeria	0	0	1	1
Totals (14 entries)		12	12	24	48

== Medal overview ==
=== Men ===
Event	Gold	Silver	Bronze
−54 kg	Jafar Aldaoud; Jordan	Abdullah Al-Mushraf; Saudi Arabia	Jakhongir Khudayberdiev; Uzbekistan
−54 kg	Jafar Aldaoud; Jordan	Abdullah Al-Mushraf; Saudi Arabia	Mohamed Zoughlami; Tunisia
−60 kg	Ali Asghar Alimoradian; Iran	Mohsen Rezaee; Afghanistan	Mohamed Elsayed Selim; Egypt
−60 kg	Ali Asghar Alimoradian; Iran	Mohsen Rezaee; Afghanistan	Gashim Magomedov; Azerbaijan
−67 kg	Diyorbek Tukhliboev; Uzbekistan	Ömer Faruk Dayıoğlu; Turkey	Aaron Kobenan; Ivory Coast
−67 kg	Diyorbek Tukhliboev; Uzbekistan	Ömer Faruk Dayıoğlu; Turkey	Nurbek Gazez; Kazakhstan
−74 kg	Zaid Kareem; Jordan	Najmiddin Kosimkhojiev; Uzbekistan	Rami Eissa; Egypt
−74 kg	Zaid Kareem; Jordan	Najmiddin Kosimkhojiev; Uzbekistan	Ali Khoshravesh; Iran
−82 kg	Haitam Zarhouti; Morocco	Amir Reza Sadeghian; Iran	Saleh El-Sharabaty; Jordan
−82 kg	Haitam Zarhouti; Morocco	Amir Reza Sadeghian; Iran	Yiğithan Kılıç; Turkey
+82 kg	Marat Mavlonov; Uzbekistan	Bauyrzhan Khassenov; Kazakhstan	Soufiane Elasbi; Morocco
+82 kg	Marat Mavlonov; Uzbekistan	Bauyrzhan Khassenov; Kazakhstan	Moatez Ifaoui; Tunisia

=== Women ===
Event	Gold	Silver	Bronze
−46 kg	Saina Karimi; Iran	Minaya Akbarova; Azerbaijan	Emine Göğebakan; Turkey
−46 kg	Saina Karimi; Iran	Minaya Akbarova; Azerbaijan	Mariama Zakari; Niger
−51 kg	Dunya Abutaleb; Saudi Arabia	Elif Sude Akgül; Turkey	Oumaima El-Bouchti; Morocco
−51 kg	Dunya Abutaleb; Saudi Arabia	Elif Sude Akgül; Turkey	Rozhan Goudarzi; Iran
−57 kg	Amina Dehhaoui; Morocco	Hatice Kübra İlgün; Turkey	Kamila Aimukasheva; Kazakhstan
−57 kg	Amina Dehhaoui; Morocco	Hatice Kübra İlgün; Turkey	Hasti Mohammadi; Iran
−63 kg	Nada Laaraj; Morocco	Hatice Pınar Yiğitalp; Turkey	Diyorakhon Azizova; Uzbekistan
−63 kg	Nada Laaraj; Morocco	Hatice Pınar Yiğitalp; Turkey	Razan Al-Rawashdeh; Jordan
−70 kg	Ozoda Sobirjonova; Uzbekistan	Yalda Valinejad; Iran	Sıla Nur Gençer; Turkey
−70 kg	Ozoda Sobirjonova; Uzbekistan	Yalda Valinejad; Iran	Elizabeth Anyanacho; Nigeria
+70 kg	Sude Yaren Uzunçavdar; Turkey	Svetlana Osipova; Uzbekistan	Melika Mirhosseini; Iran
+70 kg	Sude Yaren Uzunçavdar; Turkey	Svetlana Osipova; Uzbekistan	Rama Abu Al-Rub; Jordan

== Participating nations ==
A total of 140 athletes from 34 nations competed in taekwondo at the 2025 Islamic Solidarity Games:

1. Afghanistan (5)
2. Albania (1)
3. Azerbaijan (10)
4. Bahrain (3)
5. Bangladesh (1)
6. Burkina Faso (2)
7. Chad (1)
8. Ivory Coast (4)
9. Egypt (5)
10. Gabon (2)
11. The Gambia (1)
12. Guinea (1)
13. Iran (12)
14. Jordan (8)
15. Kazakhstan (7)
16. Kyrgyzstan (5)
17. Malaysia (1)
18. Mali (1)
19. Mauritania (1)
20. Morocco (6)
21. Mozambique (1)
22. Niger (6)
23. Nigeria (1)
24. Oman (2)
25. Pakistan (8)
26. Palestine (4)
27. Qatar (2)
28. Saudi Arabia (7)
29. Senegal (1)
30. Tajikistan (2)
31. Tunisia (4)
32. Turkey (12)
33. United Arab Emirates (1)
34. Uzbekistan (12)

== Men's results ==
=== Men's 54 kg ===
Round of 16
Aziret Duisenbek (KAZ)	2
Shahzaib Khan (PAK)	0
Mahamadou Amadou (NIG)	0
Deniz Dağdelen (TUR)	2
Amir Ahmadi (IRI)	0
Abdullah Al-Mushraf (KSA)	2
Jafar Aldaoud (JOR)	2
Mamadou Bella Diallo (GUI)	0
Mohamed Zoughlami (TUN)	2
Bahruz Guluzade (AZE)	0
Nibras Al-Tooqi (OMA)	2
Ihasam Rahimi (AFG)	0

Quarterfinals
Assem Aboserea (EGY)	2
Aziret Duisenbek (KAZ)	0
Deniz Dağdelen (TUR)	0
Abdullah Al-Mushraf (KSA)	2
Jafar Aldaoud (JOR)	2
Mohamed Zoughlami (TUN)	0
Nibras Al-Tooqi (OMA)	0
Jakhongir Khudayberdiev (UZB)	2

Semifinals
Assem Aboserea (EGY)	1
Abdullah Al-Mushraf (KSA)	2
Jafar Aldaoud (JOR)	2
Jakhongir Khudayberdiev (UZB)	0

Final
Abdullah Al-Mushraf (KSA)	0
Jafar Aldaoud (JOR)	2

Repechage round
Amir Ahmadi (IRI)	0
Deniz Dağdelen (TUR)	2
Mamadou Bella Diallo (GUI)
Mohamed Zoughlami (TUN)	WO

Bronze medal match
Jakhongir Khudayberdiev (UZB)	2
Deniz Dağdelen (TUR)	1
Assem Aboserea (EGY)	0
Mohamed Zoughlami (TUN)	2

=== Men's 60 kg ===
Round of 16
Haroon Khan (PAK)	2
Mahmoud Yousif (JOR)	0
Youssouf Simpara (MLI)	0
Kamronbek Mansurov (UZB)	2
Mohsen Rezaee (AFG)	2
Abdullah Al-Qumizi (KSA)	1
Casimir Betel (CHA)	0
Ali Asghar Alimoradian (IRI)	1
Issa Diakité (CIV)	2
Enes Kaplan (TUR)	0
Nouridine Issaka (NIG)	2
Noureddine Triki (TUN)	0
Mohamed Elsayed Selim (EGY)	2
Omar Hantoli (PLE)	1

Quarterfinals
Gashim Magomedov (AZE)	2
Haroon Khan (PAK)	0
Kamronbek Mansurov (UZB)	1
Mohsen Rezaee (AFG)	2
Ali Asghar Alimoradian (IRI)	2
Issa Diakité (CIV)	0
Nouridine Issaka (NIG)	0
Mohamed Elsayed Selim (EGY)	2

Semifinals
Gashim Magomedov (AZE)	1
Mohsen Rezaee (AFG)	2
Ali Asghar Alimoradian (IRI)	2
Mohamed Elsayed Selim (EGY)	0

Final
Mohsen Rezaee (AFG)	1
Ali Asghar Alimoradian (IRI)	2

Repechage round
Abdullah Al-Qumizi (KSA)	0
Kamronbek Mansurov (UZB)	2
Casimir Betel (CHA)	0
Issa Diakité (CIV)	2

Bronze medal match
Mohamed Elsayed Selim (EGY)	2
Kamronbek Mansurov (UZB)	0
Gashim Magomedov (AZE)	2
Issa Diakité (CIV)	0

=== Men's 67 kg ===
Round of 16
Noman Khan (PAK)	0
Diaa Ziad (PLE)	2
Diyorbek Tukhliboev (UZB)	2
Aaron Kobenan (CIV)	1
Adham Abdelmonem (EGY)	2
Ahmed Bin Qasim (KSA)	1
Bocar Diop (SEN)	0
Hamed Asghari (IRI)	2
Hamza Nashash (JOR)	2
Fares Boujemai (TUN)	0
Riyad Shiraliyev (AZE)	0
Nurbek Gazez (KAZ)	2

Quarterfinals
Ibrahim Maïga (BUR)	2
Diaa Ziad (PLE)	0
Diyorbek Tukhliboev (UZB)	2
Adham Abdelmonem (EGY)	0
Hamed Asghari (IRI)	2
Hamza Nashash (JOR)	0
Nurbek Gazez (KAZ)	0
Ömer Faruk Dayıoğlu (TUR)	2

Semifinals
Ibrahim Maïga (BUR)	0
Diyorbek Tukhliboev (UZB)	2
Hamed Asghari (IRI)	0
Ömer Faruk Dayıoğlu (TUR)	2

Final
Diyorbek Tukhliboev (UZB)	2
Ömer Faruk Dayıoğlu (TUR)	0

Repechage round
Aaron Kobenan (CIV)	2
Adham Abdelmonem (EGY)	0

Bronze medal match
Hamed Asghari (IRI)	0
Aaron Kobenan (CIV)	2
Ibrahim Maïga (BUR)	1
Nurbek Gazez (KAZ)	2

=== Men's 74 kg ===
Round of 16
Mohammed Alhooti (BHR)	0
Ali Khoshravesh (IRI)	2
Rami Eissa (EGY)	2
Hikmatullah Zain (AFG)	1
Nurullo Murudov (TJK)	0
Zaid Kareem (JOR)	2
Javad Aghayev (AZE)	2
Ernest Merdanaj (ALB)	0

Quarterfinals
Najmiddin Kosimkhojiev (UZB)	2
Ali Khoshravesh (IRI)	1
Rami Eissa (EGY)	2
Tareg Hamedi (KSA)	1
Amar Cissé Moussa (GAB)	0
Zaid Kareem (JOR)	2
Javad Aghayev (AZE)	1
Ömer Furkan Körpe (TUR)	0

Semifinals
Najmiddin Kosimkhojiev (UZB)	2
Rami Eissa (EGY)	0
Zaid Kareem (JOR)	2
Javad Aghayev (AZE)	1

Final
Najmiddin Kosimkhojiev (UZB)	0
Zaid Kareem (JOR)	2

Repechage round
Nurullo Murudov (TJK)	0
Amar Cissé Moussa (GAB)	2

Bronze medal match
Ali Khoshravesh (IRI)	2
Javad Aghayev (AZE)	0
Rami Eissa (EGY)	2
Amar Cissé Moussa (GAB)	0

=== Men's 82 kg ===
Round of 16
Omid Sahak (AFG)	0
Ahmad Rawy (EGY)	2
Haitam Zarhouti (MAR)	2
Ikhtisham Ul Haq (PAK)	0
Akbar Aitakhunov (KGZ)	0
Ali Al-Khaibari (KSA)	2
Amir Reza Sadeghian (IRI)	2
Yiğithan Kılıç (TUR)	0
Taleh Suleymanov (AZE)	1
Mohamed Ouattara (CIV)	0

Quarterfinals
Jasurbek Jaysunov (UZB)	2
Ahmad Rawy (EGY)	0
Haitam Zarhouti (MAR)	2
Ali Al-Khaibari (KSA)	0
Faysal Sawadogo (BUR)	1
Amir Reza Sadeghian (IRI)	2
Taleh Suleymanov (AZE)	0
Saleh El-Sharabaty (JOR)	2

Semifinals
Jasurbek Jaysunov (UZB)	1
Haitam Zarhouti (MAR)	2
Amir Reza Sadeghian (IRI)	2
Saleh El-Sharabaty (JOR)	1

Final
Haitam Zarhouti (MAR)	2
Amir Reza Sadeghian (IRI)	0

Repechage round
Ikhtisham Ul Haq (PAK)	1
Ali Al-Khaibari (KSA)	2
Faysal Sawadogo (BUR)	0
Yiğithan Kılıç (TUR)	2

Bronze medal match
Saleh El-Sharabaty (JOR)	2
Ali Al-Khaibari (KSA)	0
Jasurbek Jaysunov (UZB)	0
Yiğithan Kılıç (TUR)	2

=== Men's +82 kg ===
Round of 16
Soufiane El-Asbi (MAR)	2
Hamzah Saeed (PAK)	0
Emre Kutalmış Ateşli (TUR)	2
Mohamad Zulhadi (MAS)	0
Abdulaziz Aldoseri (BHR)	0
Ali Ahmadi (IRI)	2
Abdulazym Abdurakhimov (KGZ)	2
Mederic Angaman (CIV)	1
Ali Akbar Amiri (AFG)	1
Bauyrzhan Khassenov (KAZ)	2

Quarterfinals
Marat Mavlonov (UZB)	2
Soufiane El-Asbi (MAR)	0
Emre Kutalmış Ateşli (TUR)	2
Ali Ahmadi (IRI)	0
Eltaj Gafarov (AZE)	2
Abdulazym Abdurakhimov (KGZ)	0
Bauyrzhan Khassenov (KAZ)	2
Moatez Ifaoui (TUN)	1

Semifinals
Marat Mavlonov (UZB)	2
Emre Kutalmış Ateşli (TUR)	0
Eltaj Gafarov (AZE)	1
Bauyrzhan Khassenov (KAZ)	2

Final
Marat Mavlonov (UZB)	2
Bauyrzhan Khassenov (KAZ)	0

Repechage round
Moatez Ifaoui (TUN)	2
Ali Akbar Amiri (AFG)	1

Bronze medal match
Soufiane El-Asbi (MAR)	2
Eltaj Gafarov (AZE)	0
Emre Kutalmış Ateşli (TUR)	0
Moatez Ifaoui (TUN)	2

== Women's results ==
=== Women's 46 kg ===
Round of 16
Saina Karimi (IRI)	2
Yarina Pugantsova (KAZ)	0

Quarterfinals
Emine Göğebakan (TUR)	0
Saina Karimi (IRI)	2
Mariama Zakari (NIG)	2
Madina Shoniyozova (UZB)	0
Minaya Akbarova (AZE)	2
Miar Qabaha (PLE)	0
Umaima Al-Hinai (OMA)	0
Farah Touzani (MAR)	2

Semifinals
Saina Karimi (IRI)	2
Mariama Zakari (NIG)	0
Minaya Akbarova (AZE)	2
Farah Touzani (MAR)	0

Final
Saina Karimi (IRI)	2
Minaya Akbarova (AZE)	0

Repechage round
Yarina Pugantsova (KAZ)	0
Emine Göğebakan (TUR)	2

Bronze medal match
Farah Touzani (MAR)	0
Emine Göğebakan (TUR)	2
Mariama Zakari (NIG)	WO
Miar Qabaha (PLE)

=== Women's 51 kg ===
Round of 16
Mst Khusbo (BAN)	0
Fateemaah Khawar (PAK)	2
Nailia Shailoobekova (KGZ)	0
Rozhan Goudarzi (IRI)	2

Quarterfinals
Dunya Abutaleb (KSA)	2
Fateemaah Khawar (PAK)	1
Samarrukh Osmanova (AZE)	0
Laylo Khasanova (UZB)	2
Oumaima El-Bouchti (MAR)	2
Botakoz Kapanova (KAZ)	0
Rozhan Goudarzi (IRI)	1
Elif Sude Akgül (TUR)	2

Semifinals
Dunya Abutaleb (KSA)	2
Laylo Khasanova (UZB)	0
Oumaima El-Bouchti (MAR)	0
Elif Sude Akgül (TUR)	2

Final
Dunya Abutaleb (KSA)	2
Elif Sude Akgül (TUR)	0

Bronze medal match
Oumaima El-Bouchti (MAR)	2
Fateemaah Khawar (PAK)	0
Laylo Khasanova (UZB)	0
Rozhan Goudarzi (IRI)	2

=== Women's 57 kg ===
Round of 16
Yaqin Faraj (PLE)	0
Maryam Mammadova (AZE)	2
Zeinab Amadou (NIG)	0
Kamila Aimukasheva (KAZ)	2
Begimai Bekmurzaeva (KGZ)	0
Hasti Mohammadi (IRI)	2

Quarterfinals
Madina Mirabzalova (UZB)	2
Maryam Mammadova (AZE)	0
Maria Marchlinski (GAM)	0
Amina Dehhaoui (MAR)	2
Fadia Khirfan (JOR)	1
Kamila Aimukasheva (KAZ)	2
Hasti Mohammadi (IRI)	1
Hatice Kübra İlgün (TUR)	2

Semifinals
Madina Mirabzalova (UZB)	1
Amina Dehhaoui (MAR)	2
Kamila Aimukasheva (KAZ)	0
Hatice Kübra İlgün (TUR)	2

Final
Amina Dehhaoui (MAR)	2
Hatice Kübra İlgün (TUR)	0

Bronze medal match
Kamila Aimukasheva (KAZ)	2
Maria Marchlinski (GAM)	1
Hasti Mohammadi (IRI)	2
Madina Mirabzalova (UZB)	1

=== Women's 63 kg ===
Round of 16
Amna Al-Loghani (UAE)	2
Nancy Essoughe (GAB)	0
Hatice Pınar Yiğitalp (TUR)	2
Tamiris Sulaimanova (KGZ)	0
Fatemeh Eskandarnia (IRI)	0
Diyorakhon Azizova (UZB)	2
Nada Laaraj (MAR)	2
Nargiz Kazimova (AZE)	1

Quarterfinals
Razan Al-Rawashdeh (JOR)	2
Amna Al-Loghani (UAE)	0
Hatice Pınar Yiğitalp (TUR)	2
Madinatou Moussa Sako (NIG)	0
Maram Fatnasi (QAT)	0
Diyorakhon Azizova (UZB)	2
Nada Laaraj (MAR)	2
Aisha Adilbekkyzy (KAZ)	0

Semifinals
Razan Al-Rawashdeh (JOR)	1
Hatice Pınar Yiğitalp (TUR)	2
Diyorakhon Azizova (UZB)	1
Nada Laaraj (MAR)	2

Final
Hatice Pınar Yiğitalp (TUR)	1
Nada Laaraj (MAR)	2

Repechage round
Tamiris Sulaimanova (KGZ)	1
Madinatou Moussa Sako (NIG)	2
Nargiz Kazimova (AZE)	1
Aisha Adilbekkyzy (KAZ)	2

Bronze medal match
Diyorakhon Azizova (UZB)	2
Madinatou Moussa Sako (NIG)	0
Razan Al-Rawashdeh (JOR)	2
Aisha Adilbekkyzy (KAZ)	0

=== Women's 70 kg ===
Round of 16
Aminata Ndiaye (MTN)	0
Iainne Da Silva Taju (MOZ)	2

Quarterfinals
Elizabeth Anyanacho (NGR)	2
Iainne Da Silva Taju (MOZ)	0
Sıla Nur Gençer (TUR)	0
Yalda Valinejad (IRI)	2
Dunya Saber (KSA)	2
Maliha Ali (PAK)	0
Sara Jallab (BHR)	0
Ozoda Sobirjonova (UZB)	2

Semifinals
Elizabeth Anyanacho (NGR)	1
Yalda Valinejad (IRI)	2
Dunya Saber (KSA)	0
Ozoda Sobirjonova (UZB)	2

Final
Yalda Valinejad (IRI)	1
Ozoda Sobirjonova (UZB)	2

Bronze medal match
Sıla Nur Gençer (TUR)	2
Dunya Saber (KSA)	0
Elizabeth Anyanacho (NGR)	2
Sara Jallab (BHR)	0

=== Women's +70 kg ===
Quarterfinals		Semifinals		Final
Svetlana Osipova (UZB)	2
Inayatou Harouna (NIG)	0	Svetlana Osipova (UZB)	2
Noor Nazar Mohammed (QAT)	0	Melika Mirhosseini (IRI)	1
Melika Mirhosseini (IRI)	2			Svetlana Osipova (UZB)	1
Rama Abu Al-Rub (JOR)	2			Sude Yaren Uzunçavdar (TUR)	2
Munira Abdusalomova (TJK)	0	Rama Abu Al-Rub (JOR)	0
Manisha Ali (PAK)	0	Sude Yaren Uzunçavdar (TUR)	2
Sude Yaren Uzunçavdar (TUR)	2

Bronze medals
Melika Mirhosseini (IRI)	2
Manisha Ali (PAK)	0
Rama Abu Al-Rub (JOR)	2
Inayatou Harouna (NIG)	0
