= Albania at the 2025 Islamic Solidarity Games =

- IOC code: ALB
- NOC: Albanian National Olympic Committee

in Riyadh, Saudi Arabia
- Competitors: 10 in 6 sports
- Medals Ranked 30th: Gold 0 Silver 2 Bronze 0 Total 2

Islamic Solidarity Games appearances (overview)
- 2005; 2013; 2017; 2021; 2025

Albania is scheduled to compete at the 2025 Islamic Solidarity Games to be held from 7 to 21 November 2025 in Riyadh, Saudi Arabia.

== Medalists ==
Medals by sport
Sport	1st place, gold medalist(s)	2nd place, silver medalist(s)	3rd place, bronze medalist(s)	Total
Weightlifting	0	2	0	2
Total	0	2	0	2

Medal	Name	Sport	Event	Date
Silver	Enkileda Carja	Weightlifting	Snatch - Women's 63 kg	10 November
Silver	Enkileda Carja	Weightlifting	Overall - Women's 63 kg	10 November

== Competitors ==
Sport	Men	Women	Total
Judo	0	1	1
Karate	2	0	2
Table tennis	1	0	1
Taekwondo	1	0	1
Weightlifting	1	1	2
Wrestling	3	0	3
Total	8	2	10

== Judo ==
Women

Athlete	Event	Round of 16	Quarterfinals	Semifinals	Repechage	Final / BM	
Athlete	Event	Opposition Result	Opposition Result	Opposition Result	Opposition Result	Opposition Result	Rank
Erisa Brahimaj	–57 kg	Al-Shareef (KSA); L 00–01	Did not advance				

== Karate ==
Men

Athlete	Event	Round of 32	Round of 16	Quarterfinals	Semifinals	Repechage	Final / BM	
Athlete	Event	Opposition Result	Opposition Result	Opposition Result	Opposition Result	Opposition Result	Opposition Result	Rank
Orges Arifi	–60 kg	Bye	Hammad (JOR); L 4–4	Did not advance				
Melos Gashi	–84 kg	Bye	Al-Juma (BRN); W 5–0	Al-Zahrani (KSA); W 2–0	Tarnakin (KAZ); L 0–3	—N/a	Falleh (ALG); L 1–6	5

== Table tennis ==
Men

Athlete	Event	Round of 64	Round of 32	Round of 16	Quarterfinal	Semifinal	Final / BM	
Athlete	Event	Opposition Result	Opposition Result	Opposition Result	Opposition Result	Opposition Result	Opposition Result	Rank
Kejdi Kalaja	Singles	Ahmed (MDV); W 4–3 (5-11, 11-8, 5-11, 11-9, 6-11, 11-8, 11-9)	Abdulhussein (QAT); L 0–4 (6-11, 3-11, 12-14, 3-11)	Did not advance				

== Taekwondo ==
Men

Athlete	Event	Round of 16	Quarterfinals	Semifinals	Repechage	Final / BM	
Athlete	Event	Opposition Result	Opposition Result	Opposition Result	Opposition Result	Opposition Result	Rank
Ernest Merdanaj	−74 kg	Aghayev (AZE); L 0–2	Did not advance				

== Weightlifting ==
Men

Athlete	Event	Snatch		Clean & Jerk		Total	Rank
Athlete	Event	Result	Rank	Result	Rank	Total	Rank
Ertjan Kofsha	−94 kg	161	6	190	8	351	4

Women

Athlete	Event	Snatch		Clean & Jerk		Total	Rank
Athlete	Event	Result	Rank	Result	Rank	Total	Rank
Enkileda Carja	−63 kg	97	2nd place, silver medalist(s)	116	4	213	2nd place, silver medalist(s)

== Wrestling ==
Albania sent three wrestlers (Chermen Valiev, Islam Dudaev and Zelimkhan Abakarov) to the Games, but none of them step on the mat in the competition.

Men's freestyle

Athlete	Event	Round of 16	Quarterfinal	Semifinal	Repechage	Final / BM	
Athlete	Event	Opposition Result	Opposition Result	Opposition Result	Opposition Result	Opposition Result	Rank
Zelimkhan Abakarov	65 kg	Alibegov (BRN); L Walkover	Did not advance				
