= Samuel Simba Cherop =

Ugandan long-distance runner

Personal information
- Born: 3 July 2006 (age 20)

Sport
- Sport: Athletics
- Event: Long distance running
Medal record
Men's athletics
Representing Uganda
Islamic Solidarity Games
Silver medal – second place	2025 Riyadh	10,000m
Bronze medal – third place	2025 Riyadh	5000m
African U20 Championships
Gold medal – first place	2025 Abeokuta	10,000m

Samuel Simba Cherop (born 3 July 2006) is an Ugandan long-distance runner. He won the 10,000 metres at the 2025 African U20 Championships.

== Biography ==
From Kapchorwa, Cherop placed fifth overall in the final of the 5000 metres at the 2024 World Athletics U20 Championships in Lima, Peru, in August 2024.

In May 2025, Cherop won a 5 km road race in Lausanne, Switzerland, setting a new course record of 13:29 at the age of 18 years-old. In June 2025, Cherop won the gold medal over 10,000 metres at the 2025 African U20 Championships in Nigeria.

Cherop was a double medalist at the 2025 Islamic Solidarity Games in Riyadh, winning the silver medal over 10,000 metres and the bronze medal over 5000 metres, whilst still a teenager. He placed fourth in the Gold meeting on the World Athletics Cross Country Tour at the C.I.C. Alcobendas-Comunidad de Madrid in Spain, on 30 November 2025.

In July 2026, while representing Uganda at the 2026 Commonwealth Games in Glasgow, Scotland, he finished seventh in the 10,000 metres in a personal best time of 27:56.68 despite running the final 6000 metres with only one shoe after racing contact in the pack of runners caused him to lose one with 15 laps remaining. In November, he had a top-ten finish at the Cross Internacional de Itálica in Seville.
