= Emmanuel Bamidele =

Nigerian athlete (born 1999)

Personal information
- Born: 6 July 1999 (age 26) Nigeria

Sport
- Country: United Arab Emirates
- Sport: Track and field
- Event: 400 m

Achievements and titles
- Personal bests: 44.24 (Austin, 2023)
Medal record
Men's athletics
Representing United Arab Emirates
Islamic Solidarity Games
Silver medal – second place	2025 Riyadh	400 m

Emmanuel Bamidele (born 6 July 1999) is a Nigerian-born Emirati track and field athlete.

== Career ==
The winner of the men's 400m at the Nigerian Commonwealth Games Trials in Abuja in 2018 with a time of 45:28 which placed him inside the world top 60 in the event by the end of the year. Soon afterwards however, there were reports that Bamidele left the Nigerian camp and was weighing up an offer to represent Qatar. By 3 May 2019, Bamidele was representing Qatar in the 400m at the 2019 Doha Diamond League at the Khalifa International Stadium in which he finished second.

By 2022 Bamidele was running for Texas A&M, finishing fourth at the outdoor SEC championships 400m and qualifying for the outdoors NCAA final 400m but did not compete in the final. He ran 45.78 seconds to finish third in the NCAA indoors and anchored the 4 × 400 m relay team to victory.

In June 2023, running for the University of Florida, he ran 44.67 for the 400m to qualify for the final of the NCAA Championships held in Texas. He subsequently won the NCAA outdoors final with a new personal best time of 44.24s.

Bamidele finished second at the Diamond League 400m contest in Stockholm on 2 July 2023, running for Nigeria.

He finished fifth in the 400 metres at the 2024 Diamond League event 2024 Meeting International Mohammed VI d'Athlétisme in Rabat.
