= Burkina Faso at the 2025 Islamic Solidarity Games =

- IOC code: BUR
- NOC: Burkinabé National Olympic and Sports Committee

in Riyadh, Saudi Arabia
- Competitors: 19 in 3 sports
- Medals Ranked 30th: Gold 0 Silver 2 Bronze 0 Total 2

Islamic Solidarity Games appearances
- 2005; 2013; 2017; 2021; 2025

Burkina Faso is scheduled to compete at the 2025 Islamic Solidarity Games to be held from 7 to 21 November 2025 in Riyadh, Saudi Arabia.

== Medalists ==
Medals by sport
Sport	1st place, gold medalist(s)	2nd place, silver medalist(s)	3rd place, bronze medalist(s)	Total
Athletics	0	2	0	2
Total	0	2	0	2

Medal	Name	Sport	Event	Date
Silver	Soumaila Sabo	Athletics	Men's Triple jump	18 November
Silver	Nemata Nikiema	Athletics	Women's Long jump	19 November

== Competitors ==
Sport	Men	Women	Total
Athletics	4	4	8
Karate	5	1	6
Taekwondo	3	2	5
Total	12	7	19

== Athletics ==
Burkina Faso sent eight athletes to the Games, but six of them (Zegue Badra Ali Berte, Sié Fahige Kambou, Yacouba Loué, Sita Sibiri, Awa Zongo and Zalissa Zongo) didn't compete at the competition.

Key

- Note–Ranks given for track events are within the athlete's heat only
- Q = Qualified for the next round
- q = Qualified for the next round as a fastest loser or, in field events, by position without achieving the qualifying target
- NR = National record
- N/A = Round not applicable for the event
- Bye = Athlete not required to compete in round

Men
Field events

Athlete	Event	Qualification		Final	
Athlete	Event	Distance	Position	Distance	Position
Soumaïla Sabo	Long jump	—N/a		DNS	
Soumaïla Sabo	Triple jump	—N/a		16.63	2nd place, silver medalist(s)
Sié Fahige Kambou	Discus throw	—N/a		DNS	

Women
Field events

Athlete	Event	Qualification		Final	
Athlete	Event	Distance	Position	Distance	Position
Nemata Nikiema	Long jump	—N/a		6.37	2nd place, silver medalist(s)

== Karate ==
Burkina Faso initially planned to send 6 karatekas (Aurore Bancé, Abdoul Dabone, Mohamed Kaboré, Nestor Nare, Toshio Sanou, Kader Traoré) to the Games, but in the end, none of them stepped onto the mat.

== Taekwondo ==
Burkina Faso sent five competitors to the Games, but three of them (Ida Kevine Bama, Chimène Ysisse Ilboudo and Youssef Laguemvare) didn't stepped onto the mat.

Men

Athlete	Event	Round of 16	Quarterfinals	Semifinals	Repechage	Final / BM	
Athlete	Event	Opposition Result	Opposition Result	Opposition Result	Opposition Result	Opposition Result	Rank
Ibrahim Maïga	−67 kg	Bye	Ziad (PLE); W 2–0	Tukhliboev (UZB); L 0–2	—N/a	Gazez (KAZ); L 1–2	5
Faysal Sawadogo	−82 kg	Bye	Reza Sadeghian (IRN); L 1–2	Did not advance	Kılıç (TUR); L 0–2	Did not advance	
