= Albania at the 2021 Islamic Solidarity Games =

- IOC code: ALB
- NOC: Albanian National Olympic Committee

in Konya, Turkey
- Competitors: 16
- Medals: Gold 0 Silver 1 Bronze 0 Total 1

Islamic Solidarity Games appearances (overview)
- 2005; 2013; 2017; 2021; 2025

Albania participated in the 2021 Islamic Solidarity Games held in Konya, Turkey from 9 to 18 August 2022.

The games had been rescheduled several times. In May 2021, the ISSF postponed the event to August 2022 citing the COVID-19 pandemic situation in the participating countries.

== Medalists ==
Medal	Name	Sport	Event	Date
Silver	Zelimkhan Abakarov	Wrestling	Men's freestyle 65 kg	10 August

Medals by sport
Sport	1st place, gold medalist(s)	2nd place, silver medalist(s)	3rd place, bronze medalist(s)	Total
Archery	0	0	0	0
Athletics	0	0	0	0
Karate	0	0	0	0
Taekwondo	0	0	0	0
Weightlifting	0	0	0	0
Wrestling	0	1	0	1
Total	0	1	0	1

== Wrestling ==
Men's freestyle

Athlete	Event	Round of 16	Quarterfinal	Semifinal	Repechage	Final / BM	
Athlete	Event	Opposition Result	Opposition Result	Opposition Result	Opposition Result	Opposition Result	Rank
Zelimkhan Abakarov	65 kg	Bye	Askarov (KAZ); W 10-0	Hojakow (TKM); W 10-0	—N/a	Aliyev (AZE); L 0-4	2nd place, silver medalist(s)
Islam Dudaev	70 kg	Ullah (PAK); W 10-0	Mammadaliyev (AZE); L 4-5	did not advance			7
