= Esports at the 2025 Islamic Solidarity Games =

- Venue: Boulevard City
- Dates: 11—12 November 2025
- Competitors: 30 from 12 nations

The Esports tournament at the 2025 Islamic Solidarity Games in Riyadh was held between 11 and 12 November 2025. The esports competition took place at Boulevard City in Saudi Arabia. A total of 32 athletes competed in the event.

== Medal table ==
* Host nation (Saudi Arabia)

Rank	Nation	Gold	Silver	Bronze	Total
1	Saudi Arabia*	2	0	0	2
2	Bahrain	0	1	0	1
2	Kuwait	0	1	0	1
4	Jordan	0	0	1	1
4	United Arab Emirates	0	0	1	1
Totals (5 entries)		2	2	2	6

== Medal overview ==
Event	Gold	Silver	Bronze
Rocket League	Saudi Arabia; Mohammed Alotaibi; Saleh Bakhashwin; Yazeed Bakhashwin	Kuwait; Abdullah Alshammari; Yousef Almutairi; Mohammad Almutairi	Jordan; Mohammad Musallam; Mohammed Bustanji; Abdel Rahman Abusnaineh
Tekken 8	Raef Al-Turkistani; Saudi Arabia	Sayed Hashem Ahmed; Bahrain	Sultan Taheri; United Arab Emirates

== Participating nations ==
A total of 30 athletes from 12 nations competed in esports at the 2025 Islamic Solidarity Games:

1. Bahrain (1)
2. Jordan (3)
3. Kazakhstan (1)
4. Kyrgyzstan (4)
5. Saudi Arabia (4)
6. Kuwait (3)
7. Morocco (5)
8. Oman (3)
9. Tajikistan (3)
10. Tunisia (1)
11. Turkey (1)
12. United Arab Emirates (1)
