= Chioma Cynthia Nweke =

Nigerian track and field athlete

Personal information
- Nationality: Nigerian
- Born: 23 July 2006 (age 20)

Sport
- Sport: Athletics
- Event: Sprinter

Achievements and titles
- Personal bests: 100m: 11.56 (2025); 200m: 24.35 (2025)
Medal record
Women's athletics
Representing Nigeria
African U20 Championships
Gold medal – first place	2025 Abeokuta	100m
Silver medal – second place	2025 Abeokuta	200m
Gold medal – first place	2025 Abeokuta	4 x 100m
Islamic Solidarity Games
Gold medal – first place	2025 Riyadh	4 x 100m

Chioma Cynthia Nweke (born 23 July 2006) is a Nigerian track and field athlete. She is a one-time national champion and a double gold and silver medalist at the 2025 African U20 Championships. She is currently ranked 263rd in the women's 100m world rankings, and in 2025, she ran a wind-aided personal best of 11.23 (+2.7).

== Career ==
In 2025, Nweke, alongside Iyanuoluwa Bada, Maria Thompson, and Olayinka Olajide, won gold at the CAA Region II Championships in Accra, recording a time of 44.92s. At the 2025 National Sports Festival, representing Team Delta, Nweke clinched a gold medal.

She became a double champion at the African U20 Championships held in Abeokuta Nweke went on to represent Nigeria at the World U20 Championships in Lima, Peru. In the 4 × 100 m relay at the 2025 Islamic Solidarity Games in Saudi Arabia, Nweke and the Nigerian quartet won gold.

In 2026, she was listed among the 32 athletes selected in the 100m and 200m events who began camping in Asaba for the 2026 Commonwealth Games in Glasgow.
