= Guinea-Bissau at the 2025 Islamic Solidarity Games =

- IOC code: GBS
- NOC: Guinea-Bissau Olympic Committee

in Riyadh, Saudi Arabia
- Competitors: 4 in 4 sports
- Medals Ranked 0th: Gold 0 Silver 0 Bronze 0 Total 0

Islamic Solidarity Games appearances
- 2005; 2013; 2017; 2021; 2025

Guinea-Bissau competed at the 2025 Islamic Solidarity Games, which were held from 7 to 21 November 2025 in Riyadh, Saudi Arabia.

== Competitors ==
Sport	Men	Women	Total
Athletics	1	0	1
Judo	1	0	1
Swimming	1	0	1
Wrestling	1	0	1
Total	4	0	4

== Athletics ==
N’djiluni Tilo Medina Semedo represented Guinea Bissau in the Men’s 100m and 200m races. He was eliminated after placing 5th in the first 100m heat and 6th in the 200m heat.

== Judo ==
Roberto Simirnoy Gomes Bore Loque represented Guinea Bissau in the 60kg Men’s Quarterfinals against Bahrain’s Poltoratskii Ruslan and the Bronze Medal Match against Egypt’s Youssry S. M. M. Hussein. Roberto lost both matches.

== Swimming ==
Pedro Lavuazer Fernandez Rogery represented Guinea Bissau in the Men’s 50m Breastroke, Butterfly, and Freestyle, as well as the 100m Freestyle.

== Wrestling ==
Diamantino luna Fafe represented Guinea Bissau in the 57kg Men’s Freestyle Quarterfinals. He lost 13-11 to Afghanistan’s Sayed Omar Zazai.
