= Togo at the 2025 Islamic Solidarity Games =

- IOC code: TOG
- NOC: Togolese National Olympic Committee

in Riyadh, Saudi Arabia
- Competitors: 10 in 4 sports
- Medals Ranked 39th: Gold 0 Silver 0 Bronze 2 Total 2

Islamic Solidarity Games appearances
- 2005; 2013; 2017; 2021; 2025

Togo is scheduled to compete at the 2025 Islamic Solidarity Games to be held from 7 to 21 November 2025 in Riyadh, Saudi Arabia.

== Medalists ==
Medals by sport
Sport	1st place, gold medalist(s)	2nd place, silver medalist(s)	3rd place, bronze medalist(s)	Total
Athletics	0	0	2	2
Total	0	0	2	2

Medal	Name	Sport	Event	Date
Bronze	Fayza Abdoukerim	Athletics	Women's Long jump	19 November
Bronze	Naomi Akakpo	Athletics	Women's 100 m hurdles	19 November

== Competitors ==
Sport	Men	Women	Total
Athletics	3	2	5
Duathlon	1	0	1
Judo	2	0	2
Table tennis	1	1	2
Total	7	3	10

== Athletics ==
Key

- Note–Ranks given for track events are within the athlete's heat only
- Q = Qualified for the next round
- q = Qualified for the next round as a fastest loser or, in field events, by position without achieving the qualifying target
- NR = National record
- N/A = Round not applicable for the event
- Bye = Athlete not required to compete in round

Men

Track & road events

Athlete	Event	Heat		Semifinal		Final	
Athlete	Event	Result	Rank	Result	Rank	Result	Rank
Kossi Médard Nayo	100 m	10.76	3 Q	10.52	7	Did not advance	11
Kossi Médard Nayo	200 m	21.02 SB	3 q	—N/a		21.02	7
Makman Yoagbati	800 m	1:50.96	5	—N/a		Did not advance	9
Makman Yoagbati	1500 m	4:07.35	6 Q	—N/a		3:58.02	10

Field events

Athlete	Event	Qualification		Final	
Athlete	Event	Distance	Position	Distance	Position
Komi Bernard Konu	Long jump	—N/a		7.54	4
Komi Bernard Konu	Triple jump	—N/a		14.98	8

Women

Track & road events

Athlete	Event	Heat		Semifinal		Final	
Athlete	Event	Result	Rank	Result	Rank	Result	Rank
Naomi Akakpo	100 m hurdles	—N/a				13.65 SB	3rd place, bronze medalist(s)

Field events

Athlete	Event	Qualification		Final	
Athlete	Event	Distance	Position	Distance	Position
Fayza Abdoukerim	Long jump	—N/a		6.05	3rd place, bronze medalist(s)
Fayza Abdoukerim	Triple jump	—N/a		14.98	8

== Duathlon ==
Men

Athlete	Event	Time						Rank
Athlete	Event	Run 1 (5 km)	Trans 1	Bike (20 km)	Trans 2	Run 2 (2.5 km)	Total	Rank
Eloi Adjavon	Sprint Race	15:59.5	0:27.3	33:05.3	0:30.5	8:26.0	58:28.9	7

== Judo ==
Men

Athlete	Event	Round of 16	Quarterfinals	Semifinals	Repechage	Final / BM	
Athlete	Event	Opposition Result	Opposition Result	Opposition Result	Opposition Result	Opposition Result	Rank
Médéric Lawson	–66 kg	Abasbekov (KGZ); L 000–111	Did not advance				
Mattheo Lawson	–73 kg	Doukkali (MAR); L 000–110	Did not advance				

== Table tennis ==
Men

Athlete	Event	Round of 64	Round of 32	Round of 16	Quarterfinal	Semifinal	Final / BM	
Athlete	Event	Opposition Result	Opposition Result	Opposition Result	Opposition Result	Opposition Result	Opposition Result	Rank
Elias Agbodjan	Singles	Bye	Guluzade (AZE); L 2–4 (11-4, 12-10, 3-11, 10-12, 3-11, 5-11)	Did not advance				

Women

Athlete	Event	Round of 32	Round of 16	Quarterfinal	Semifinal	Final / BM	
Athlete	Event	Opposition Result	Opposition Result	Opposition Result	Opposition Result	Opposition Result	Rank
Ayoko Amah	Singles	Kudusova (KGZ); L 0–4 (4-11, 6-11, 4-11, 5-11)	Did not advance				

Mixed

Athlete	Event	Round of 16	Quarterfinal	Semifinal	Final / BM	
Athlete	Event	Opposition Result	Opposition Result	Opposition Result	Opposition Result	Rank
Elias Agbodjan; Ayoko Amah	Doubles	Ahmed / Nazim (MDV); L 0–3 (6-11, 9-11, 10-12)	Did not advance			
