= Camel racing at the 2025 Islamic Solidarity Games =

- Venue: Al Janadryah
- Dates: 18—20 November 2025
- Competitors: 12 from 10 nations

The camel racing tournament at the 2025 Islamic Solidarity Games in Riyadh was held between 18 and 20 November 2025. The camel racing competition took place at Al Janadryah in Saudi Arabia. This was the first time camel racing was a part of the official Islamic Solidarity Games programme.

== Medal table ==
* Host nation (Saudi Arabia)

Rank	Nation	Gold	Silver	Bronze	Total
1	Saudi Arabia*	4	2	0	6
2	United Arab Emirates	0	2	3	5
3	Jordan	0	0	1	1
Totals (3 entries)		4	4	4	12

== Medal overview ==
Event	Gold	Silver	Bronze
Men's 2000 m	Ahmed Aljohani; Saudi Arabia	Rashid Alkaabi; United Arab Emirates	Matar Almheiri; United Arab Emirates
Men's 8000 m	Suleiman Aljohni; Saudi Arabia	Ahmed Aljohni; Saudi Arabia	Matar Almheiri; United Arab Emirates
Women's 2000 m	Kholoud Alshammari; Saudi Arabia	Fatima Alameri; United Arab Emirates	Rawan Salah; Jordan
Women's 8000 m	Kholoud Alshammari; Saudi Arabia	Hadeel Alsharif; Saudi Arabia	Fatima Alameri; United Arab Emirates

== Participating nations ==
A total of 24 athletes (16 man and 8 woman) from 16 nations competed in camel racing at the 2025 Islamic Solidarity Games:

1. Chad (1)
2. Egypt (1)
3. Jordan (1)
4. Kuwait (1)
5. Libya (1)
6. Mali (1)
7. Qatar (1)
8. Saudi Arabia (4)
9. United Arab Emirates (1)
10. Uzbekistan (1)
11. Somalia (1)
12. Tunisia (2)
13. Indonesia (1)
14. Bahrain (1)
15. Algeria (1)
16. Yemen (1)

== Results ==
=== Men's 2000m ===
1. Saudi Arabia - Ahmed Aljohni - 3:02.779
2. United Arab Emirates - Rashid Abdullah Alkaabi - 3:03.645
3. United Arab Emirates - Matar Almheiri - 3:04.102
4. Qatar - -
5. Kuwait - -
6. Yemen - -
7. Bahrain - -
8. Sudan - -
9. Libya - -
10. Indonesia - -
11. Tunisia - - DNF
12. Egypt - - DNF

=== Men's 8000m ===
1. Saudi Arabia - Alard Sulaiman - 15:19.947
2. Saudi Arabia - Ahmed Aljohni - 15:24.547
3. United Arab Emirates - Matar Almheiri - 15:27.214
4. Sudan - -
5. Yemen - -
6. Uzbekistan - -
7. Somalia - -
8. Chad - -
9. Egypt - -
10. Algeria - - DNF
11. Jordan - - DNF
12. Tunisia - - DNF
13. Tunisia - - DNF
14. United Arab Emirates - - DNF

=== Women's 2000m ===
1. Saudi Arabia - Kholud Alshammari - 3:07.713
2. United Arab Emirates - Fatima Eidha Alameri - 3:09.601
3. Jordan - Rawan Salah - 3:09.774
4. Saudi Arabia - Hadeel Alsharif - 3:12.331
5. United Arab Emirates - Watfa Abdulrahman - 3:12.703
6. Yemen - Reem Salem - 3:22.771
7. Bahrain - Mariam Kamal - DNF

=== Women's 8000m ===
1. Saudi Arabia - Kholud Alshammari - 15:22.558
2. Saudi Arabia - Hadeel Alsharif - 15:26.448
3. United Arab Emirates - Fatima Eidha Alameri - 17:47.552
4. Jordan - Rawan Salah - 18:13.423
5. Yemen - Reem Salem - 19:28.127
