= Judo at the 2025 Islamic Solidarity Games =

Judo Judo at the 2025 Islamic Solidarity Games
- Venue: Prince Faisal bin Fahad Sports City
- Location: Riyadh, Saudi Arabia
- Dates: 8–10 November
- Competitors: 183 from 33 nations
- Website: Official website

Competition at external databases
- Links: IJF • JudoInside

The judo tournament at the 2025 Islamic Solidarity Games was held from 8 to 10 November 2025 at the Prince Faisal bin Fahad Sports City in Riyadh, Saudi Arabia.

== Medal table ==
* Host nation (Saudi Arabia)

Rank	Nation	Gold	Silver	Bronze	Total
1	Turkey	6	0	2	8
2	Uzbekistan	3	4	4	11
3	Azerbaijan	3	2	5	10
4	Kazakhstan	1	3	3	7
5	United Arab Emirates	1	0	4	5
6	Egypt	1	0	2	3
7	Tajikistan	0	2	2	4
8	Kyrgyzstan	0	2	1	3
9	Bahrain	0	1	2	3
10	Cameroon	0	1	0	1
11	Tunisia	0	0	3	3
12	Iran	0	0	1	1
12	Morocco	0	0	1	1
Totals (13 entries)		15	15	30	60

== Medal summary ==
=== Men ===
Event	Gold	Silver	Bronze
−60 kg	Salih Yıldız; Turkey	Sherzod Davlatov; Kazakhstan	Youssry Samy; Egypt
−60 kg	Salih Yıldız; Turkey	Sherzod Davlatov; Kazakhstan	Ruslan Poltoratskii; Bahrain
−66 kg	Zamohshari Bekmurodov; Uzbekistan	Yerzhan Yerenkaiypov; Kazakhstan	Narmandakh Bayanmunkh; United Arab Emirates
−66 kg	Zamohshari Bekmurodov; Uzbekistan	Yerzhan Yerenkaiypov; Kazakhstan	Ruslan Pashayev; Azerbaijan
−73 kg	Hidayat Heydarov; Azerbaijan	Shakhram Ahadov; Uzbekistan	Makhmadbek Makhmadbekov; United Arab Emirates
−73 kg	Hidayat Heydarov; Azerbaijan	Shakhram Ahadov; Uzbekistan	Abubakr Sherov; Tajikistan
−81 kg	Vedat Albayrak; Turkey	Madi Amangeldi; Kazakhstan	Askerbii Gerbekov; Bahrain
−81 kg	Vedat Albayrak; Turkey	Madi Amangeldi; Kazakhstan	Gadzhimurad Omarov; United Arab Emirates
−90 kg	Shakhzodxuja Sharipov; Uzbekistan	Israpil Sagaipov; Bahrain	Aidar Arapov; Kazakhstan
−90 kg	Shakhzodxuja Sharipov; Uzbekistan	Israpil Sagaipov; Bahrain	Eljan Hajiyev; Azerbaijan
−100 kg	Omar Elramly; Egypt	Zelym Kotsoiev; Azerbaijan	Dzhakhongir Madzhidov; Tajikistan
−100 kg	Omar Elramly; Egypt	Zelym Kotsoiev; Azerbaijan	Dzhafar Kostoev; United Arab Emirates
+100 kg	Muzaffarbek Turoboyev; Uzbekistan	Temur Rakhimov; Tajikistan	Ushangi Kokauri; Azerbaijan
+100 kg	Muzaffarbek Turoboyev; Uzbekistan	Temur Rakhimov; Tajikistan	Alisher Yusupov; Uzbekistan

=== Women ===
Event	Gold	Silver	Bronze
−48 kg	Tuğçe Beder; Turkey	Konul Aliyeva; Azerbaijan	Laziza Haydarova; Uzbekistan
−48 kg	Tuğçe Beder; Turkey	Konul Aliyeva; Azerbaijan	Oumaima Bedioui; Tunisia
−52 kg	Bishreltiin Khorloodoi; United Arab Emirates	Madina Qurbonzoda; Tajikistan	Aydan Valiyeva; Azerbaijan
−52 kg	Bishreltiin Khorloodoi; United Arab Emirates	Madina Qurbonzoda; Tajikistan	Soumiya Iraoui; Morocco
−57 kg	Hasret Bozkurt; Turkey	Zhanar Zholdosheva; Kyrgyzstan	Tassnim Roshdy; Egypt
−57 kg	Hasret Bozkurt; Turkey	Zhanar Zholdosheva; Kyrgyzstan	Shukurjon Aminova; Uzbekistan
−63 kg	Ayten Yeksan; Turkey	Adina Kochkonbaeva; Kyrgyzstan	Minel Akdeniz; Turkey
−63 kg	Ayten Yeksan; Turkey	Adina Kochkonbaeva; Kyrgyzstan	Samalay Yergaliyeva; Kazakhstan
−70 kg	Sudaba Aghayeva; Azerbaijan	Khurshida Razzokberdieva; Uzbekistan	Aytaj Gardashkhanli; Azerbaijan
−70 kg	Sudaba Aghayeva; Azerbaijan	Khurshida Razzokberdieva; Uzbekistan	Maryam Barbat; Iran
−78 kg	Aruna Jangeldina; Kazakhstan	Georgika Wesly Djengue Moune; Cameroon	Marjona Kuchimova; Uzbekistan
−78 kg	Aruna Jangeldina; Kazakhstan	Georgika Wesly Djengue Moune; Cameroon	Arij Agueb; Tunisia
+78 kg	Hilal Öztürk; Turkey	Iriskhon Kurbanbaeva; Uzbekistan	Siwar Dhawedi; Tunisia
+78 kg	Hilal Öztürk; Turkey	Iriskhon Kurbanbaeva; Uzbekistan	Nazgul Maratova; Kazakhstan

=== Mixed Team ===
Event	Gold	Silver	Bronze
Mixed Team	Azerbaijan; Fidan Alizada; Sudaba Aghayeva; Aytaj Gardashkhanli; Aydan Valiyeva; Hidayat Heydarov; Ruslan Pashayev; Gunel Hasanli; Eljan Hajiyev; Ushangi Kokauri; Zelym Kotsoiev	Uzbekistan; Alisher Yusupov; Arslonbek Tojiev; Marjona Kuchimova; Muzaffarbek Turoboyev; Iriskhon Kurbanbaeva; Marjona Nurullaeva; Shukurjon Aminova; Khurshida Razzokberdieva; Shakhzodxuja Sharipov; Laziza Haydarova; Shakhram Ahadov; Umida Nigmatova; Mukhayyo Akhmatova	Turkey; Buketnur Karabulut; Minel Akdeniz; Ejder Toktay; Ayten Yeksan; Hasret Bozkurt; Münir Ertuğ; Muhammed Demirel; Vedat Albayrak; Hilal Öztürk
Mixed Team	Azerbaijan; Fidan Alizada; Sudaba Aghayeva; Aytaj Gardashkhanli; Aydan Valiyeva; Hidayat Heydarov; Ruslan Pashayev; Gunel Hasanli; Eljan Hajiyev; Ushangi Kokauri; Zelym Kotsoiev	Uzbekistan; Alisher Yusupov; Arslonbek Tojiev; Marjona Kuchimova; Muzaffarbek Turoboyev; Iriskhon Kurbanbaeva; Marjona Nurullaeva; Shukurjon Aminova; Khurshida Razzokberdieva; Shakhzodxuja Sharipov; Laziza Haydarova; Shakhram Ahadov; Umida Nigmatova; Mukhayyo Akhmatova	Kyrgyzstan; Erbol Abasbekov; Luiza Asakeeva; Nurmukhammed Bakirdinov; Erlan Sherov; Adina Kochkonbaeva; Myrzaiym Duishonbekova; Akmarzhan Turdazhieva; Emirkhan Zholdoshkaziev; Zhanar Zholdosheva; Tegin Almazjan Uulu; Aidemi Kalyeva

== Participating nations ==
A total of 183 athletes from 33 nations competed in taekwondo at the 2025 Islamic Solidarity Games:

1. Albania (1)
2. Algeria (7)
3. Azerbaijan (14)
4. Bahrain (5)
5. Bangladesh (2)
6. Cameroon (6)
7. Comoros (1)
8. Djibouti (2)
9. Egypt (7)
10. Gabon (1)
11. The Gambia (2)
12. Guinea (4)
13. Iran (5)
14. Kazakhstan (13)
15. Kyrgyzstan (13)
16. Lebanon (3)
17. Mauritania (2)
18. Morocco (4)
19. Mozambique (3)
20. Niger (9)
21. Nigeria (3)
22. Palestine (3)
23. Qatar (4)
24. Saudi Arabia (14)
25. Senegal (1)
26. Sierra Leone (4)
27. Sudan (2)
28. Tajikistan (7)
29. Togo (2)
30. Tunisia (5)
31. Turkey (12)
32. United Arab Emirates (7)
33. Uzbekistan (14)
