= Athletics at the 2025 Islamic Solidarity Games =

Athletics competition

- Venue: Prince Faisal bin Fahd Sports City Stadium
- Dates: 17—20 November 2025
- Competitors: 300 in 42 + 9 events from 47 nations

The Athletics tournament at the 2025 Islamic Solidarity Games in Riyadh was held between 17—20 November 2025. The athletics competition took place at Prince Faisal bin Fahd Sports City Stadium in Saudi Arabia.

== Medal table (Total) ==
* Host nation (Saudi Arabia)

| Rank | Nation | Gold | Silver | Bronze | Total |
|---|---|---|---|---|---|
| 1 | Bahrain | 10 | 5 | 2 | 17 |
| 2 | Turkey | 7 | 6 | 7 | 20 |
| 3 | Uzbekistan | 6 | 6 | 4 | 16 |
| 4 | Saudi Arabia* | 5 | 3 | 3 | 11 |
| 5 | Iran | 4 | 2 | 2 | 8 |
| 6 | Morocco | 3 | 4 | 3 | 10 |
| 7 | Algeria | 3 | 1 | 3 | 7 |
| 8 | Nigeria | 2 | 5 | 3 | 10 |
| 9 | Cameroon | 2 | 1 | 4 | 7 |
| 10 | Egypt | 2 | 0 | 1 | 3 |
| 11 | Uganda | 1 | 3 | 3 | 7 |
| 12 | Djibouti | 1 | 1 | 2 | 4 |
| 13 | Oman | 1 | 1 | 1 | 3 |
| 14 | Kuwait | 1 | 1 | 0 | 2 |
| 14 | Pakistan | 1 | 1 | 0 | 2 |
| 14 | Senegal | 1 | 1 | 0 | 2 |
| 14 | Tunisia | 1 | 1 | 0 | 2 |
| 18 | Libya | 1 | 0 | 0 | 1 |
| 19 | Burkina Faso | 0 | 2 | 0 | 2 |
| 19 | United Arab Emirates | 0 | 2 | 0 | 2 |
| 21 | Iraq | 0 | 1 | 3 | 4 |
| 22 | Guinea | 0 | 1 | 0 | 1 |
| 22 | Jordan | 0 | 1 | 0 | 1 |
| 22 | Niger | 0 | 1 | 0 | 1 |
| 25 | Guyana | 0 | 0 | 2 | 2 |
| 25 | Togo | 0 | 0 | 2 | 2 |
| 27 | Azerbaijan | 0 | 0 | 1 | 1 |
| 27 | Kazakhstan | 0 | 0 | 1 | 1 |
| 27 | Qatar | 0 | 0 | 1 | 1 |
| 27 | The Gambia | 0 | 0 | 1 | 1 |
| Totals (30 entries) | | 52 | 50 | 49 | 151 |

== Medal table (Athletics) ==
* Host nation (Saudi Arabia)

| Rank | Nation | Gold | Silver | Bronze | Total |
|---|---|---|---|---|---|
| 1 | Bahrain | 9 | 5 | 2 | 16 |
| 2 | Turkey | 7 | 5 | 6 | 18 |
| 3 | Uzbekistan | 6 | 5 | 3 | 14 |
| 4 | Morocco | 3 | 3 | 3 | 9 |
| 5 | Nigeria | 2 | 4 | 3 | 9 |
| 6 | Saudi Arabia* | 2 | 2 | 1 | 5 |
| 7 | Cameroon | 2 | 1 | 4 | 7 |
| 8 | Iran | 2 | 1 | 1 | 4 |
| 9 | Algeria | 2 | 0 | 3 | 5 |
| 10 | Egypt | 2 | 0 | 0 | 2 |
| 11 | Uganda | 1 | 3 | 3 | 7 |
| 12 | Djibouti | 1 | 1 | 2 | 4 |
| 13 | Oman | 1 | 1 | 1 | 3 |
| 14 | Pakistan | 1 | 1 | 0 | 2 |
| 14 | Senegal | 1 | 1 | 0 | 2 |
| 16 | Kuwait | 1 | 0 | 0 | 1 |
| 17 | Burkina Faso | 0 | 2 | 0 | 2 |
| 17 | Iraq | 0 | 2 | 0 | 2 |
| 17 | United Arab Emirates | 0 | 2 | 0 | 2 |
| 20 | Guinea | 0 | 1 | 0 | 1 |
| 20 | Niger | 0 | 1 | 0 | 1 |
| 22 | Guyana | 0 | 0 | 2 | 2 |
| 22 | Qatar | 0 | 0 | 2 | 2 |
| 22 | Togo | 0 | 0 | 2 | 2 |
| 25 | Azerbaijan | 0 | 0 | 1 | 1 |
| 25 | Kazakhstan | 0 | 0 | 1 | 1 |
| 25 | The Gambia | 0 | 0 | 1 | 1 |
| Totals (27 entries) | | 43 | 41 | 41 | 125 |

- 42 events was played. Women race walking not held. Shared gold in mens high jump. Bronze not awarded in mens pole vault.

== Medal summary ==
=== Men ===
| Event | Gold | | Silver | | Bronze | |
|---|---|---|---|---|---|---|
| 100 metres | Ali Anwar Ali Al-Balushi; Oman | 10.30 | Abdulaziz Atafi; Saudi Arabia | 10.32 | Emmanuel Eseme; Cameroon | 10.32 |
| 200 metres | Emmanuel Eseme; Cameroon | 20.55 | Abdulaziz Atafi; Saudi Arabia | 20.65 | Claude Itoungue Bongogne; Cameroon | 20.84 |
| 400 metres | Rachid M'Hamdi; Morocco | 45.40 | Emmanuel Bamidele; United Arab Emirates | 45.71 | Gafari Atanda Badmus; Nigeria | 45.71 |
| 800 metres | Ali Amirian; Iran | 1:46.18 | Abderrahman El Assal; Morocco | 1:46.23 | Abubaker Abdalla; Qatar | 1:46.26 |
| 1500 metres | Anass Essayi; Morocco | 3:44.20 | Mehmet Çelik; Turkey | 3:44.50 | Anis Chott; Algeria | 3:44.65 |
| 5000 metres | Mohamed Ismail Ibrahim; Djibouti | 13:46.12 | Birhanu Balew; Bahrain | 13:46.26 | Samuel Simba Cherop; Uganda | 13:46.45 |
| 10,000 metres | Birhanu Balew; Bahrain | 29:06.58 | Samuel Simba Cherop; Uganda | 29:06.58 | Abel Chebet; Uganda | 29:07.63 |
| 4 × 100 metres relay | Saudi Arabia; Mohammed Abdullah; Abdulaziz Atafi; Abdulaziz Al-Jadani; Abdullah Mohammed | 39.19 | Oman; Rashid Al-Aasmi; Malham Al-Balushi; Ali Al-Balushi; Mohamed Al-Sadi | 39.21 | Nigeria; Caleb Temidara John; Chidera Ezeakor; Ezekiel Eno Asuquo; James Taiwo Emmanuel | 39.51 |
| 110 metres hurdles | Yaqoub Al-Youha; Kuwait | 13.62 GR | Saguirou Badamassi; Niger | 13.89 | Mikdat Sevler; Turkey | 13.91 |
| 400 metres hurdles | Berke Akçam; Turkey | 49.22 GR | El Mehdi Dimmokrati; Morocco | 49.58 | İsmail Nezir; Turkey | 50.87 |
| 3000 metres steeplechase | Salaheddine Ben Yazide; Morocco | 8:51.64 | Mohamed Ismail Ibrahim; Djibouti | 8:51.89 | Omar Seraïche; Algeria | 8:51.96 |
| 5000 metres walk | Ismail Benhammouda; Algeria | 19:16.12 GR | Salih Korkmaz; Turkey | 19:29.59 | Mazlum Demir; Turkey | 19:36.13 |
| High jump | Amir Nagaev; Uzbekistan Yasir Kuduban; Turkey | 2.15 m | Shared gold | | Fatek Bait Jaboob; Oman | 2.13 m |
| Pole vault | Hussain Al-Hizam; Saudi Arabia | 5.65 m GR | Ameer Saihood; Iraq | 5.10 m | Not awarded | |
| Long jump | Anvar Anvarov; Uzbekistan | 8.09 | Amath Faye; Senegal | 7.86 | Emanuel Archibald; Guyana | 7.56 |
| Triple jump | Ibrohim Makhkamov; Uzbekistan | 16.74 m | Soumaïla Sabo; Burkina Faso | 16.63 m | Sami Bakheet; Saudi Arabia | 16.50 m |
| Shot put | Mohamed Magdi Hamza; Egypt | 19.39 m | Mohammad Reza Tayebi; Iran | 19.35 m | Abdelrahman Mahmoud; Bahrain | 18.71 m |
| Discus throw | Ömer Şahin; Turkey | 58.92 m | Mustafa Al-Saamah; Iraq | 57.11 m | Moaaz Ibrahim; Qatar | 56.90 m |
| Hammer throw | Halil Yılmazer; Turkey | 74.70 m | Suhrob Khodjaev; Uzbekistan | 74.44 m | Ayyubkhon Fayozov; Uzbekistan | 74.12 m |
| Javelin throw | Arshad Nadeem; Pakistan | 83.05 m | Muhammad Yasir; Pakistan | 76.04 m | Samuel Adams Kure; Nigeria | 76.01 m |
| Decathlon | Nodir Norbaev; Uzbekistan | 7633 pts | Zakhiriddin Shokirov; Uzbekistan | 7487 pts | Dhiae Cherif Boudoumi; Algeria | 7259 pts |

=== Women ===
| Event | Gold | | Silver | | Bronze | |
|---|---|---|---|---|---|---|
| 100 metres | Edidiong Odiong; Bahrain | 11.17 GR | Herverge Kole Etame; Cameroon | 11.38 | Keliza Smith; Guyana | 11.59 |
| 200 metres | Edidiong Odiong; Bahrain | 22.99 | Salwa Naser; Bahrain | 23.52 | Herverge Kole Etame; Cameroon | 23.60 |
| 400 metres | Salwa Naser; Bahrain | 51.59 | Patience Okon George; Nigeria | 51.93 | Leni Shida; Uganda | 52.72 |
| 800 metres | Nelly Korir; Bahrain | 2:02.59 | Halima Naakayi; Uganda | 2:03.14 | Soukaina Hajji; Morocco | 2:04.34 |
| 1500 metres | Nelly Korir; Bahrain | 4:21.56 | Soukaina Hajji; Morocco | 4:22.77 | Bahiya El Arfaoui; Morocco | 4:23.11 |
| 5000 metres | Winfred Yavi; Bahrain | 15:43.51 | Charity Cherop; Uganda | 15:47.01 | Samiya Hassan Nour; Djibouti | 15:48.28 |
| 10,000 metres | Rebecca Chelangat; Uganda | 32:11.42 | Violah Motosio; Bahrain | 32:13.59 | Samiya Hassan Nour; Djibouti | 32:17.79 |
| 4 × 100 metres relay | Nigeria; Iyanuoluwa Toyin Bada; Oluebube Miracle Ezechukwu; Maria Thompson Omokwe; Chioma Cynthia Nweke | 44.27 | Bahrain; Layla Kamal; Edidiong Odiong; Raihanah Garoubah; Hajar Al-Khaldi | 44.47 | The Gambia; Mariama Camara; Nyimasata Jawneh; Jalika Bajinka; Isatou Sey | 45.05 |
| 100 metres hurdles | Cansu Nimet Sayın; Turkey | 13.54 =GR | Lidiya Podsepkina; Uzbekistan | 13.56 | Naomi Akakpo; Togo | 13.65 |
| 400 metres hurdles | Oluwakemi Adekoya; Bahrain | 56.33 | Mariam Kareem; United Arab Emirates | 57.42 | Linda Angounou; Cameroon | 58.24 |
| 3000 metres steeplechase | Winfred Yavi; Bahrain | 9:40.65 | Tuğba Güvenç; Turkey | 9:57.05 | Ikram Ouaaziz; Morocco | 10:00.55 |
| High jump | Barnokhon Sayfullaeva; Uzbekistan | 1.84 m | Fatoumata Balley; Guinea | 1.84 m | Valeriya Gorbatova; Uzbekistan | 1.81 m |
| Pole vault | Demet Parlak; Turkey | 4.06 m | Buse Arıkazan; Turkey | 4.01 m | Mahsa Mirzatabibi; Iran | 3.86 m |
| Long jump | Esraa Owis; Egypt | 6.55 m GR | Nemata Nikiema; Burkina Faso | 6.37 m | Fayza Abdoukerim; Togo | 6.05 m |
| Triple jump | Saly Sarr; Senegal | 14.52 m GR | Sharifa Davronova; Uzbekistan | 13.91 m | Yekaterina Sariyeva; Azerbaijan | 13.84 m |
| Shot put | Emel Dereli; Turkey | 16.09 m | Oyesade Olatoye; Nigeria | 16.05 m | Noora Jasim; Bahrain | 15.44 m |
| Discus throw | Nora Monie; Cameroon | 57.04 m GR | Obiageri Amaechi; Nigeria | 56.99 m | Özlem Becerek; Turkey | 55.56 m |
| Hammer throw | Zahra Tatar; Algeria | 63.55 m | Oyesade Olatoye; Nigeria | 63.34 m | Zarinakhon Nosirjonova; Uzbekistan | 61.69 m |
| Javelin throw | Nargizakhon Kuchkarova; Uzbekistan | 59.39 m | Esra Türkmen; Turkey | 56.19 m | Eda Tuğsuz; Turkey | 55.58 m |
| Heptathlon | Fatemeh Mohitizadeh; Iran | 5562 pts NR | Ugiloy Norboeva; Uzbekistan | 5488 pts | Irina Konichsheva; Kazakhstan | 5270 pts |

=== Mixed ===
| Event | Gold | | Silver | | Bronze | |
|---|---|---|---|---|---|---|
| 4 × 400 metres relay | Nigeria; Gafari Atanda Badmus; Anita Itohan Enaruna; Ezekiel Eno Asuquo; Patience Okon George | 3:16.27 GR | Bahrain; Musa Isah; Oluwakemi Adekoya; Alaa Sami; Salwa Naser | 3:17.28 | Turkey; Ismail Nezir; Simay Özçiftçi; Berke Akçam; Sila Koloğlu | 3:17.73 |

== Para athletics ==
=== Medal table ===
* Host nation (Saudi Arabia)

| Rank | Nation | Gold | Silver | Bronze | Total |
|---|---|---|---|---|---|
| 1 | Saudi Arabia* | 3 | 1 | 2 | 6 |
| 2 | Iran | 2 | 1 | 1 | 4 |
| 3 | Algeria | 1 | 1 | 0 | 2 |
| 3 | Tunisia | 1 | 1 | 0 | 2 |
| 5 | Bahrain | 1 | 0 | 0 | 1 |
| 5 | Libya | 1 | 0 | 0 | 1 |
| 7 | Turkey | 0 | 1 | 1 | 2 |
| 7 | Uzbekistan | 0 | 1 | 1 | 2 |
| 9 | Jordan | 0 | 1 | 0 | 1 |
| 9 | Morocco | 0 | 1 | 0 | 1 |
| 9 | Nigeria | 0 | 1 | 0 | 1 |
| 12 | Iraq | 0 | 0 | 2 | 2 |
| 13 | Egypt | 0 | 0 | 1 | 1 |
| Totals (13 entries) | | 9 | 9 | 8 | 26 |

=== Men's Para Athletics ===
| Event | Gold | | Silver | | Bronze | |
|---|---|---|---|---|---|---|
| Shot Put F57 | Yasin Khosravi; Iran | 15.65 | Mohammad Khalvandi; Turkey | 14.45 | Hamid Haydari; Turkey | 13.93 |
| Discus Throw F33/F34 | Hani Al-Nakhli; Saudi Arabia | 950 | Ahmad Hindi; Jordan | 893 | Hussein Khafaji; Iraq | 881 |
| Discus Throw Discus F57 | Mahmoud Rajab; Libya | 46.63 | Yorkinbek Odilov; Uzbekistan | 46.26 | Hussein Khazaee; Iraq | 44.54 |
| 100m T37 | Ali Al-Nakhli; Saudi Arabia | 11.46 | Sofiane Hamdi; Algeria | 11.89 | Mostafa Ibrahim Mohamed; Egypt | 12.38 |
| 100m T53/54 | Jamaan Al-Zahrani; Saudi Arabia | 14.54 | Mohamed Nidhal Khlifi; Tunisia | 15.44 | Abdulrahman Al-Qurashi; Saudi Arabia | 15.54 |

=== Women's Para Athletics ===
| Event | Gold | | Silver | | Bronze | |
|---|---|---|---|---|---|---|
| Discus Throw F56 | Nafissa Saad; Algeria | 17.52 | Nadha Al-Humaydani; Saudi Arabia | 17.23 | Not awarded | |
| Club Throw F32 | Maroua Brahmi; Tunisia | 25.79 | Oumaima Oubraym; Morocco | 24.20 | Parastoo Habibi; Iran | 22.89 |
| Shot Put F55/56 | Rooba Al-Omari; Bahrain | 7.39 | Ogochukwu Modesta Ogili; Nigeria | 7.35 | Nadha Al-Humaydani; Saudi Arabia | 6.13 |
| Javelin Throw F55/56 | Hashemiyeh Motaghian; Iran | 22.45 | Zeinab Moradi; Iran | 21.98 | Natalya Semyonova; Uzbekistan | 16.88 |

== Participating nations ==
=== Athletics ===
A total of 300 athletes from 47 nations competed in athletics at the 2025 Islamic Solidarity Games.

- Afghanistan (1)
- Algeria (7)
- Azerbaijan (9)
- Bangladesh (4)
- Bahrain (20)
- Benin (2)
- Burkina Faso (2)
- Chad (3)
- Cameroon (11)
- Comoros (2)
- Djibouti (9)
- Egypt (5)
- The Gambia (9)
- Guinea (2)
- Guinea-Bissau (1)
- Guyana (11)
- Iran (7)
- Iraq (5)
- Ivory Coast (1)
- Jordan (1)
- Kazakhstan (10)
- Kuwait (9)
- Kyrgyzstan (2)
- Libya (1)
- Malaysia (2)
- Maldives (2)
- Mauritania (1)
- Morocco (14)
- Niger (2)
- Nigeria (17)
- Oman (6)
- Pakistan (3)
- Palestine (2)
- Qatar (7)
- Saudi Arabia (15)
- Senegal (5)
- Sierra Leone (1)
- Somalia (1)
- Sudan (3)
- Suriname (1)
- Tajikistan (2)
- Togo (5)
- Tunisia (1)
- Turkey (29)
- Uganda (17)
- United Arab Emirates (4)
- Uzbekistan (26)
