= 2025 Islamic Solidarity Games =

Multi-sport event in Riyadh, Saudi Arabia

6th Islamic Solidarity Games
- Host city: Riyadh
- Country: Saudi Arabia
- Motto: One Ummah (Arabic: "أمة واحدة")
- Nations: 56
- Athletes: 3,065
- Events: 269 in 21 sports
- Opening: 7 November
- Closing: 21 November 2025
- Opened by: Riyadh Province Governor Faisal bin Bandar Al Saud
- Athlete's Oath: Ali Al-Khadrawi; Jana Al-Ammari
- Judge's Oath: Manar Al-Ghamdi; Raed Matar
- Main venue: Al Janadryah (opening ceremony); Princess Nourah Bint Abdul Rahman University Stadium (closing ceremony)
- Website: 6th Islamic Solidarity Games

The 2025 Islamic Solidarity Games (Arabic: ألعاب التضامن الإسلامي 2025), officially the 6th Islamic Solidarity Games (Arabic: دورة ألعاب التضامن الإسلامي السادسة) and also known as Riyadh 2025 (Arabic: الرياض 2025), was an inter-continental multi-sport event organised by the Islamic Solidarity Sports Association (ISSA), held from 7 to 21 November 2025 in Riyadh, Saudi Arabia.

The event returns to its regular four-year cycle, following the 2021 Islamic Solidarity Games in Konya, Turkey, which were postponed to 2022 due to the COVID-19 pandemic.

== Host selection ==
On 15 April 2021, Cameroon's bid was selected to host the Games, which were initially set to become the first edition held on the African continent. However, due to concerns over the country's infrastructure and readiness, the Islamic Solidarity Sports Association (ISSA) later withdrew the hosting rights and awarded the event to Saudi Arabia, with Riyadh confirmed as the new host city.

== Venues ==
Venue	Sports	Capacity
Al Janadryah	Opening ceremony	TBA
Al Janadryah	Camel racing	TBA
Al Janadryah	Equestrian	TBA
Princess Nourah Bint Abdul Rahman University Stadium	Closing ceremony	TBA
Boulevard City	Fencing	TBA
Boulevard City	Volleyball	TBA
Boulevard City	Esports	TBA
Boulevard City	Table tennis	TBA
Boulevard City	Wrestling	TBA
Boulevard City	Weightlifting	TBA
Boulevard City	Wushu	TBA
Sports Boulevard	3x3 Basketball	TBA
Sports Boulevard	Boxing	TBA
Sports Boulevard	Muaythai	TBA
Boulevard City Jumps Area	Athletics (jumps)	2,500
Saudi Arabian Olympic Committee Complex Green Hall 1	Futsal	3,000
Saudi Arabian Olympic Committee Complex Green Hall 1	Handball	3,000
Saudi Arabian Olympic Committee Complex Green Hall 2	Swimming	456
Prince Faisal bin Fahd Sports City Stadium	Athletics (except for jumps)	22,188
Prince Faisal bin Fahd Sports City Malaz Halls	Ju-jitsu	922
Prince Faisal bin Fahd Sports City Malaz Halls	Judo	922
Prince Faisal bin Fahd Sports City Malaz Halls	Karate	922
Prince Faisal bin Fahd Sports City Malaz Halls	Taekwondo	922
Sand Sports Park	Duathlon	TBA

== Sports ==
2025 Islamic Solidarity Games sports programme (medal events)

- 3x3 basketball (2)
- Athletics (42)
  - Para-athletics (9)
- Boxing (10)
- Camel racing (4)
- Duathlon (2)
- Equestrian (1)
- Esports (2)
- Fencing (12)
- Futsal (1)
- Handball (2)
- Judo (15)
- Ju-jitsu (9)
- Karate (12)
- Muaythai (9)
- Swimming (40)
- Table tennis (7)
- Taekwondo (12)
- Volleyball (2)
- Weightlifting (48)
  - Para powerlifting (4)
- Wrestling (18)
- Wushu (6)

2025 Islamic Solidarity Games sports programme (demonstration events)

- Kurash (4)
- Pencak silat (4)

== Participating nations ==
All 57 members of the Islamic Solidarity Sports Association were present at the Games.

Participating National Committees
- Afghanistan (69)
- Albania (10)
- Algeria (117)
- Azerbaijan (179)
- Bahrain (106)
- Bangladesh (36)
- Benin (7)
- Brunei (7)
- Burkina Faso (17)
- Cameroon (51)
- Chad (6)
- Comoros (6)
- Djibouti (17)
- Egypt (75)
- Gabon (9)
- The Gambia (16)
- Guinea (31)
- Guinea-Bissau (4)
- Guyana (19)
- Indonesia (37)
- Iran (191)
- Iraq (57)
- Ivory Coast (28)
- Jordan (42)
- Kazakhstan (99)
- Kuwait (68)
- Kyrgyzstan (90)
- Lebanon (21)
- Libya (46)
- Malaysia (17)
- Maldives (49)
- Mali (2)
- Mauritania (11)
- Morocco (82)
- Mozambique (8)
- Niger (30)
- Nigeria (72)
- Oman (34)
- Pakistan (55)
- Palestine (32)
- Qatar (108)
- Saudi Arabia (213) (host)
- Senegal (23)
- Sierra Leone (45)
- Somalia (6)
- Sudan (27)
- Suriname (2)
- Syria (5)
- Tajikistan (65)
- Togo (10)
- Tunisia (51)
- Turkey (216)
- Turkmenistan (1)
- Uganda (59)
- United Arab Emirates (71)
- Uzbekistan (194)
- Yemen (8)

== Calendar ==
OC	Opening ceremony	●	Event competitions	1	Event finals	CC	Closing ceremony

November 2025	4th Tue	5th Wed	6th Thu	7th Fri	8th Sat	9th Sun	10th Mon	11th Tue	12th Wed	13th Thu	14th Fri	15th Sat	16th Sun	17th Mon	18th Tue	19th Wed	20th Thu	21st Fri	Events
Ceremonies				OC														CC	—N/a
3x3 basketball														●	●	2			2
Athletics														11	12	15	13		51
Boxing			●		●	●	10												10
Camel racing															●		4		4
Duathlon											1	1							2
Equestrian									●	●		1							1
Esports								●	2										2
Fencing														2	2	2	6		12
Futsal	●		●		●	●		1											1
Handball										●	●	●	●	●	●	●	●	2	2
Judo					7	7	1												15
Ju-jitsu																	5	4	9
Karate								6	6										12
Muaythai								●	●	●	9								9
Para powerlifting																		4	4
Swimming					5	10	7	6	12										40
Table tennis					●	●	2	●	●	5									7
Taekwondo												4	4	4					12
Volleyball	●	●	●		●	●	●	●	●	2									2
Weightlifting					9	9	12	9	9										48
Wrestling															4	5	5	4	18
Wushu												●	6						6
Daily medal events	0	0	0	0	21	26	32	22	29	7	10	6	10	17	18	24	33	14	269
Kurash (demonstration)			4																4
Pencak silat (demonstration)		4																	4
November 2025	4th Tue	5th Wed	6th Thu	7th Fri	8th Sat	9th Sun	10th Mon	11th Tue	12th Wed	13th Thu	14th Fri	15th Sat	16th Sun	17th Mon	18th Tue	19th Wed	20th Thu	21st Fri	Events

== Medal table ==
* Host nation (Saudi Arabia)

2025 Islamic Solidarity Games medal table
Rank	Nation	Gold	Silver	Bronze	Total
1	Turkey	72	44	39	155
2	Uzbekistan	29	35	32	96
3	Iran	29	19	33	81
4	Saudi Arabia*	18	12	27	57
5	Egypt	17	11	17	45
6	Bahrain	16	11	7	34
7	Kazakhstan	15	20	21	56
8	Nigeria	11	12	7	30
9	Morocco	10	7	9	26
10	Azerbaijan	9	19	31	59
11	United Arab Emirates	6	7	14	27
12	Algeria	5	8	21	34
13	Indonesia	4	12	9	25
14	Kyrgyzstan	4	4	11	19
15	Tunisia	4	4	10	18
16	Uganda	3	4	6	13
17	Jordan	3	3	10	16
18	Qatar	3	3	5	11
19	Kuwait	2	4	1	7
20	Cameroon	2	2	6	10
21	Oman	2	2	5	9
22	Iraq	1	7	6	14
23	Senegal	1	2	2	5
24	Pakistan	1	1	3	5
25	Djibouti	1	1	2	4
26	Afghanistan	1	1	1	3
27	Libya	1	0	1	2
28	Tajikistan	0	3	3	6
29	Palestine	0	2	3	5
30	Albania	0	2	0	2
30	Burkina Faso	0	2	0	2
32	Bangladesh	0	1	4	5
33	Niger	0	1	1	2
33	Syria	0	1	1	2
35	Guinea	0	1	0	1
36	Lebanon	0	0	4	4
37	Ivory Coast	0	0	3	3
37	Malaysia	0	0	3	3
39	Guyana	0	0	2	2
39	Togo	0	0	2	2
41	Maldives	0	0	1	1
41	The Gambia	0	0	1	1
Totals (42 entries)		270	268	364	902

== Marketing ==
=== Mascot ===
The official mascot of the Games, Finjaal (Arabic: فنجال) was unveiled on 1 August 2025. He embodies the values of generosity and authenticity, which are considered among the most cherished virtues in Arab culture and have been passed down through generations.

Finjaal derives its name from the traditional Arab coffee cup, or finjan, a symbol of generosity and authenticity in Arab culture. Its head is shaped like a finjan, cream-colored with a golden rim and decorated with green palm fronds and small red accents reminiscent of dates or pomegranates. It is described as brave, skilled, adventurous, artistic, and energetic.

=== Slogan ===
The official slogan of the 2025 Islamic Solidarity Games, "One Nation", was announced 30 days before the start of the tournament. The slogan is intended to symbolize the unity, solidarity, and shared values among the countries of the Islamic world through the power of sport.
