= List of Islamic Solidarity Games records in swimming =

The fastest times in the swimming events at the Islamic Solidarity Games are designated as the Islamic Solidarity Games records in swimming. The events are held in a long course (50 m) pool. The last Games were held in Riyadh, Saudi Arabia in 2025.

All records were set in finals unless noted otherwise.

== Men ==
Event	Time	Name	Nationality	Date	Meet	Location	Ref
50m freestyle	22.28	Oussama Sahnoune	Algeria	May 2017	2017 Games	Baku, Azerbaijan	
100m freestyle	49.15	Oussama Sahnoune	Algeria	May 2017	2017 Games	Baku, Azerbaijan	
200m freestyle	1:48.65	Ahmet Mete Boylu	Turkey	11 November 2025	2025 Games	Riyadh, Saudi Arabia	
400m freestyle	3:50.01	Ilya Sibirtsev	Uzbekistan	12 November 2025	2025 Games	Riyadh, Saudi Arabia	
800m freestyle	7:54.34	Maksym Shemberev	Azerbaijan	May 2017	2017 Games	Baku, Azerbaijan	
1500m freestyle	15:04.84	Kuzey Tuncelli	Turkey	8 November 2025	2025 Games	Riyadh, Saudi Arabia	
50m backstroke	25.12	I Gede Siman Sudartawa	Indonesia	May 2017	2017 Games	Baku, Azerbaijan	
100m backstroke	55.23	I Gede Siman Sudartawa	Indonesia	May 2017	2017 Games	Baku, Azerbaijan	
200m backstroke	2:00.08	Berke Saka	Turkey	12 November 2025	2025 Games	Riyadh, Saudi Arabia	
50m breaststroke	27.36	Emre Sakçı	Turkey	13 August 2022	2021 Games	Konya, Turkey	
100m breaststroke	1:00.54	Denis Petrashov	Kyrgyzstan	16 August 2022	2021 Games	Konya, Turkey	
200m breaststroke	2:11.92	Berkay Ömer Öğretir	Turkey	14 August 2022	2021 Games	Konya, Turkey	
50m butterfly	23.50	Adilbek Mussin	Kazakhstan	17 August 2022	2021 Games	Konya, Turkey	
100m butterfly	52.69	Eldorbek Usmonov	Uzbekistan	12 November 2025	2025 Games	Riyadh, Saudi Arabia	
200m butterfly	1:57.72	Maksym Shemberev	Azerbaijan	May 2017	2017 Games	Baku, Azerbaijan	
200m individual medley	1:59.51	Berke Saka	Turkey	9 November 2025	2025 Games	Riyadh, Saudi Arabia	
400m individual medley	4:16.56	Maksym Shemberev	Azerbaijan	May 2017	2017 Games	Baku, Azerbaijan	
4×100m freestyle relay	3:20.60	Emre Gürdenli (50.48); Doğa Çelik (50.64); Baturalp Ünlü (49.68); Emre Sakçı (49.80)	Turkey	13 August 2022	2021 Games	Konya, Turkey	
4×200m freestyle relay	7:26.03	Efe Turan (1:53.65); Yiğit Aslan (1:52.23); Batuhan Filiz (1:50.27); Baturalp Ünlü (1:49.88)	Turkey	15 August 2022	2021 Games	Konya, Turkey	
4×100m medley relay	3:40.43	Aleksey Tarasenko (57.69); Vladislav Mustafin (1:01.00); Eldorbek Usmonov (53.12); Khurshidjon Tursunov (48.62)	Uzbekistan	17 August 2022	2021 Games	Konya, Turkey	

Legend:
Records not set in finals: h – heat; sf – semifinal; r – relay 1st leg; rh – relay heat 1st leg

== Women ==
Event	Time	Name	Nationality	Date	Meet	Location	Ref
50m freestyle	25.59	Gloria Muzito	Uganda	9 November 2025	2025 Games	Riyadh, Saudi Arabia	
100m freestyle	55.26	Gloria Muzito	Uganda	11 November 2025	2025 Games	Riyadh, Saudi Arabia	
200m freestyle	2:02.09	Merve Tuncel	Turkey	16 August 2022	2021 Games	Konya, Turkey	
400m freestyle	4:12.93	Merve Tuncel	Turkey	17 August 2022	2021 Games	Konya, Turkey	
800m freestyle	8:40.14	Merve Tuncel	Turkey	13 August 2022	2021 Games	Konya, Turkey	
1500m freestyle	16:27.63	Merve Tuncel	Turkey	15 August 2022	2021 Games	Konya, Turkey	
50m backstroke	28.51	Ekaterina Avramova	Turkey	May 2017	2017 Games	Baku, Azerbaijan	
100m backstroke	1:01.47	Ekaterina Avramova	Turkey	14 August 2022	2021 Games	Konya, Turkey	
200m backstroke	2:12.44	Ekaterina Avramova	Turkey	15 August 2022	2021 Games	Konya, Turkey	
50m breaststroke	31.71	Adelaida Pchelintseva	Kazakhstan	13 August 2022	2021 Games	Konya, Turkey	
100m breaststroke	1:08.72	Viktoriya Zeynep Güneş	Turkey	May 2017	2017 Games	Baku, Azerbaijan	
200m breaststroke	2:27.25	Viktoriya Zeynep Güneş	Turkey	May 2017	2017 Games	Baku, Azerbaijan	
50m butterfly	26.99	Sofia Spodarenko	Kazakhstan	9 November 2025	2025 Games	Riyadh, Saudi Arabia	
100m butterfly	1:01.00	Deniz Ertan	Turkey	17 August 2022	2021 Games	Konya, Turkey	
200m butterfly	2:11.78	Nida Eliz Üstündağ	Turkey	May 2017	2017 Games	Baku, Azerbaijan	
200m individual medley	2:15.78	Viktoriya Zeynep Güneş	Turkey	May 2017	2017 Games	Baku, Azerbaijan	
400m individual medley	4:45.18	Viktoriya Zeynep Güneş	Turkey	May 2017	2017 Games	Baku, Azerbaijan	
4×100m freestyle relay	3:47.77	İlknur Nihan Çakıcı; Sezin Eligül; Esra Kübra Kaçmaz; Ekaterina Avramova	Turkey	May 2017	2017 Games	Baku, Azerbaijan	
4×200m freestyle relay	8:16.47	Sezin Eligül; Selen Özbilen; Esra Kübra Kaçmaz; Gizem Bozkurt	Turkey	May 2017	2017 Games	Baku, Azerbaijan	
4×100m medley relay	4:11.52	Ekaterina Avramova (1:01.71); Viktoriya Zeynep Güneş (1:09.17); Deniz Ertan (1:02.64); İlknur Nihan Çakıcı (58.00)	Turkey	17 August 2022	2021 Games	Konya, Turkey	

Legend:
Records not set in finals: h – heat; sf – semifinal; r – relay 1st leg; rh – relay heat 1st leg

== Mixed ==
Event	Time	Name	Nationality	Date	Meet	Location	Ref
4×100 m freestyle relay	3:38.15	Ahmet Mete Boylu (51.63); Demir Özdemir (51.22); Nehir Toker (59.56); Gizem Güvenç (55.74)	Turkey	8 November 2025	2025 Games	Riyadh, Saudi Arabia	
4×100 m medley relay	3:57.96	Mert Ali Satır (56.41); Emre Sakçı (1:01.17); Defne Tanığ (1:04.45); Gizem Güvenç (55.93)	Turkey	10 November 2025	2025 Games	Riyadh, Saudi Arabia	

Legend:
Records not set in finals: h – heat
