= Indonesia at the 2025 Islamic Solidarity Games =

- IOC code: INA
- NOC: Indonesian Olympic Committee

in Riyadh, Saudi Arabia
- Competitors: 37 in 6 sports
- Flag bearer: Flairene Candrea
- Medals Ranked 13th: Gold 4 Silver 12 Bronze 9 Total 25

Islamic Solidarity Games appearances (overview)
- 2005; 2013; 2017; 2021; 2025

Indonesia competed at the 2025 Islamic Solidarity Games, which were held from 7 to 21 November 2025 in Riyadh, Saudi Arabia. Indonesia is without their best athletes as some are focused on preparing for the 2025 SEA Games in Thailand.

== Competitors ==
Sport	Men	Women	Total
Fencing	6	6	12
Camel racing	1	1	2
Muaythai	1	2	3
Swimming	4	4	8
Weightlifting	4	5	9
Wrestling	0	3	3
Total	16	21	37

== Medalists ==
Medal	Name	Sport	Event	Date
Gold	Muhammad Husni	Weightlifting	Men's 60 kg – snatch	8 November
Gold	Muhammad Husni	Weightlifting	Men's 60 kg – clean & jerk	8 November
Gold	Muhammad Husni	Weightlifting	Men's 60 kg – total	8 November
Gold	Adellia	Swimming	Women's 200 m breaststroke	10 November
Silver	Tita Nurcahya Melyani	Weightlifting	Women's 48 kg – snatch	8 November
Silver	Tita Nurcahya Melyani	Weightlifting	Women's 48 kg – clean & jerk	8 November
Silver	Tita Nurcahya Melyani	Weightlifting	Women's 48 kg – total	8 November
Silver	Basilia Bamerop Ninggan	Weightlifting	Women's 53 kg – snatch	8 November
Silver	Basilia Bamerop Ninggan	Weightlifting	Women's 53 kg – clean & jerk	8 November
Silver	Basilia Bamerop Ninggan	Weightlifting	Women's 53 kg – total	8 November
Silver	Adellia	Swimming	Women's 100 m breaststroke	9 November
Silver	Jason Donovan Yusuf; Joe Aditya Wijaya Kurniawan; Nadia Aisha Nurazmi; Azzahra Permatahani	Swimming	Mixed 4x100 m freestyle relay	8 November
Silver	Leonardo Adventino Geovani	Weightlifting	Men's 65 kg – snatch	9 November
Silver	Azzahra Permatahani	Swimming	Women's 200 m individual medley	9 November
Silver	Farrel Armandio Tangkas; Muhammad Dwiky Raharjo; Azzahra Permatahani; Nadia Aisha Nurazmi	Swimming	Mixed 4x100 m medley relay	10 November
Silver	Flairene Candrea; Adellia; Azzahra Permatahani; Nadia Aisha Nurazmi	Swimming	Women's 4x100 m medley relay	11 November
Bronze	Nadia Aisha Nurazmi	Swimming	Women's 50 m freestyle	9 November
Bronze	Nadita Aprilia	Weightlifting	Women's 63 kg – clean & jerk	10 November
Bronze	Flairene Candrea	Swimming	Women's 100 m backstroke	10 November
Bronze	Farrel Armandio Tangkas; Muhammad Dwiky Raharjo; Joe Aditya Wijaya Kurniawan; Jason Donovan Yusuf	Swimming	Men's 4x100 m medley relay	11 November
Bronze	Flairene Candrea	Swimming	Women's 50 m backstroke	12 November
Bronze	Jason Donovan Yusuf	Swimming	Men's 50 m backstroke	12 November
Bronze	Nadia Aisha Nurazmi; Azzahra Permatahani; Flairene Candrea; Adellia	Swimming	Women's 4x100 m freestyle relay	12 November
Bronze	Alma Fauziah Ismail; Nazwa Salwa Nissa; Indah Nur Safarin	Fencing	Women's team sabre	21 November
Bronze	Putri Yanti; Siti Amalia; Jessika Amelia	Fencing	Women's team foil	21 November

=== Summary ===
Medals by sport
Sport	1st place, gold medalist(s)	2nd place, silver medalist(s)	3rd place, bronze medalist(s)	Total
Weightlifting	3	7	1	11
Swimming	1	5	6	12
Fencing	0	0	2	2
Total	4	12	9	25

Medals by day
Day	Date	Gold	Silver	Bronze	Total
1	8 November	3	7	0	10
2	9 November	0	3	1	4
3	10 November	1	1	2	4
4	11 November	0	1	1	2
5	12 November	0	0	3	3
14	21 November	0	0	2	2
Total		4	12	9	25

Medals by gender
Gender	Gold	Silver	Bronze	Total
Male	3	1	2	6
Female	1	9	7	17
Mixed	0	2	0	2
Total	4	12	9	25

== Fencing ==
=== Men ===
Athlete	Category	Preliminary Round							Round of 32	Round of 16	Quarterfinals	Semifinals	Final / BM
Athlete	Category	Opponent Result	Opponent Result	Opponent Result	Opponent Result	Opponent Result	Opponent Result	Rank	Opponent Result	Opponent Result	Opponent Result	Opponent Result	Rank
Andi Akbar Wirasatuhu Luqman	Épée Individual	Abdulrahman Al Jadra (QAT); L 2-5	Mohammad Emaeili (IRI); L 4-5	Khalifah Alomairi (KSA); W 5-2	Omran Albloushi (UAE); W 5-3	Mohamadou Fessal (BRN); W 4-1	—N/a	3 Q	Andi Raziel Ridwan Sundra (INA); W 15-9	Vadim Sharlaimov (KAZ); L 13-15	Did not advance		
Arval Raziel Ridwan Sundara	Épée Individual	Jawad Aldawood (KSA); L 3-4	Yerlik Sertay (KAZ); W 5-2	Roman Petrov (KGZ); L 1-5	Ahmed Alsiheeri (LBA); L 4-5	Saleh Bukhlaif (BRN); W 5-4	Saad Salem Nasser Almadhagi (YEM); W 5-1	4 Q	Andi Raziel Ridwan Luqman (INA); L 9-15	Did not advance			
Andi Akbar Wirasatuhu Luqman; Andi Raziel Ridwan Sundra; Ricky Dhisullimah	Épée Team	—N/a								Iran (IRI); L 29-45	Did not advance		
Dita Afriadi	Sabre Individual	Furkan Yaman (TUR); L 0-5	Musa Aymuratov (UZB); L 2-5	Abdullah Almansaf (KSA); L 2-5	Khalid Mubarak (UAE); W 5-2	Muhammad Nauman Ejaz (PAK); W 5-1	—N/a	4 Q	Khalid Mubarak (UAE); L 11-15	Did not advance			
Ricky Dhisullimah	Sabre Individual	Ahmed Ferjani (TUN); L 4-5	Evann Jean Abba Girault (NIG); L 1-5	Mohammad Abdulkareem (KUW); L 2-5	Khalifa Alebrii (UAE); W 5-3	Ghulam Murtaza (BRN); W 5-0	—N/a	4 Q	Enes Talha Kalender (TUR); L 5-15	Did not advance			
Aldo Pratama Anjoni; Dita Afriadi; Ricky Dhisullimah	Sabre Team	—N/a									Turkey (TUR); L 16-45	Did not advance	
Aldo Pratama Arjoni	Foil Individual	Abdulkarim Saad (BRN); L 1-5	Radmir Semeneev (UZB); L 0-5	Ibrahim Alhodaib (KSA); W 5-2	Tim Abramkin (KGZ); L 1-5	Adham Eldeeb (QAT); L 2-5	Muzammil Khan (PAK); W 5-1	5 Q	Khalifa Alkaabi (UAE); W 15-14	Faris Alblooshi (UAE); L 8-15	Did not advance		
Zaydan Kariim	Foil Individual	Faris Alblooshi (UAE); L 0-5	Ilyas Molina (UZB); L 1-5	Ahmed Anwar Ashoor Yousuf Keskes (OMN); L 0-5	Abdulwahab Mohammad (UAE); L 4-5	Ali Alamiri (BRN); L 0-5	Mehmood Sharif (PAK); W 5-0	6 Q	Adham Eldeeb (QAT); L 4-15	Did not advance			
Aldo Pratama Anjoni; Zaydan Kariim; Ricky Dhisullimah	Foil Team	—N/a									United Arab Emirates (UAE); L WO	Did not advance	

=== Women ===
Athlete	Category	Preliminary Round						Round of 32	Round of 16	Quarterfinals	Semifinals	Final / BM	
Athlete	Category	Opponent Result	Opponent Result	Opponent Result	Opponent Result	Opponent Result	Rank	Opponent Result	Opponent Result	Opponent Result	Opponent Result	Opponent Result	Rank
Nazwa Salwa Nissa	Épée Individual	Sevara Rakhimova (UZB); L 2-5	Nazrin Mehdijyeva (AZE); W 5-4	Murzataeva Munira (KGZ); W 5-2	Salma Said Hamed Said Al Dighaishi (OMN); L 2-5	Zainab Alhosani (UAE); W 3-5	3 Q	Shaikha Ali (QAT); L 14-15	Did not advance				
Jesyca Emilia	Épée Individual	Ceren Cebe (TUR); L 2-5	Jana Mohamed Othman Mohamed Al Sharji (OMN); L 2-5	Alia Mayrova (KGZ); L 3-5	Dhay Alamiri (KSA); L 4-5	Thkrayat Al Abdulla (QAT); W 5-4	5 Q	Zainab Alhosani (UAE); L 10-15	Did not advance				
Jesyca Emilia; Siti Putri Amalia; Nissa Nazwa Salwa	Épée Team	—N/a							Bye	Saudi Arabia (KSA); L 16-17	Did not advance		
Indah Nur Safarin	Sabre Individual	Nisanur Erbil (TUR); L 1-5	Palina Kaspiarovich (AZE); L 2-5	Gulistan Perdebaeva (UZB); L 3-5	Essomba Mbega Lorina Dorothee (CMR); W 5-4	Ruba Almasri (KSA); W 5-1	4 Q	—N/a	Essomba Mbega Lorina Dorothee (CMR); L 11-15	Did not advance			
Alma Fauziah Ismail	Sabre Individual	Sabina Karimova (AZE); L 0-5	Talene Akudmani (KSA); L 4-5	Zaynab Dayibekova (UZB); L 2-5	Nil Gungor (TUR); L 0-5	Alma Fauziah Ismail (BRU); L 1-5	6 Q	Talane Alkdumani (KSA); L 10-15	Did not advance				
Indah Nur Safirin; Alma Fauziah Ismail; Nissa Nazwa Salwa	Sabre Team	—N/a								Bye	Uzbekistan (UZB); L 13-45	Did not advance	3rd place, bronze medalist(s)
Putri Yanti	Foil Individual	Sofiya Aktayeva (KAZ); W 5-4	Ysmine Soussi (TUN); L 3-5	Sumaya Albuainain (BRN); L 3-5	Basma Alrashid (KSA); W 5-1	Ghzal Yousuf Mohamed Said Al Fulaiti (OMN); W 5-1	3 Q	—N/a	Bye	Israa Saif Nasser Salim Al Siyabi (OMN); L 5-15	Did not advance		
Siti Putri Amalia	Foil Individual	Nourane Bchir (TUN); L 0-5	Israa Saif Nasser Salim Al Siyabi (OMN); L0-5	Lameed Almarri (KSA); L 3-5	Alara Atmaca (TUR); L 0-5	—N/a	5 Q	—N/a	Lameed Almarri (KSA); L 6-15	Did not advance			
Siti Putri Amalia; Putri Yanti; Jessya Emilia	Foil Team	—N/a									Bahrain (BRN); L 33-45	Did not advance	3rd place, bronze medalist(s)

== Muaythai ==
Men

Athlete	Category	Round of 16	Quarterfinals	Semifinals	Repechage	Final / BM	
Athlete	Category	Opponent Result	Opponent Result	Opponent Result	Opponent Result	Opponent Result	Rank
Ardiansyah	–75 kg	Ubaidillah (MAS); W WO	Jahangir (AFG); L 27-30	Did not advance			

Women

Athlete	Category	Round of 16	Quarterfinals	Semifinals	Repechage	Final / BM	
Athlete	Category	Opponent Result	Opponent Result	Opponent Result	Opponent Result	Opponent Result	Rank
Angelina Runtukahu	50–55 kg	Alghussein (KSA); W 20-18	Bouhmada (UAE); L 9-10	Did not advance			
Antonia Bui Ola	55–60 kg	Bye	Alfar (KSA); L 28-29	Did not advance			

== Weightlifting ==
Men

Athlete	Category	Snatch		Clean & Jerk		Total	Rank
Athlete	Category	Result	Rank	Result	Rank	Total	Rank
Muhammad Husni	60 kg	129	1st place, gold medalist(s)	154	1st place, gold medalist(s)	283	1st place, gold medalist(s)
Leonardo Adventino Geovani	65 kg	139	2nd place, silver medalist(s)	163	6	302	4
Raihan Adesta Putra Perdana	79 kg	136	8	168	8	304	8
Muhammad Ripqy Ramadhan	+110 kg	~~145~~	DNF	195	6	—	—

Women

Athlete	Category	Snatch		Clean & Jerk		Total	Rank
Athlete	Category	Result	Rank	Result	Rank	Total	Rank
Tita Nurcahya Melyani	48 kg	68	2nd place, silver medalist(s)	85	2nd place, silver medalist(s)	153	2nd place, silver medalist(s)
Basilia Bamerop Ninggan	53 kg	75	2nd place, silver medalist(s)	99	2nd place, silver medalist(s)	174	2nd place, silver medalist(s)
Amel Candra Novitasari	58 kg	82	4	100	4	182	4
Nadita Aprilia	63 kg	94	4	117	3rd place, bronze medalist(s)	211	4
Jihan Syafitri	+86 kg	~~95~~	DNF	126	6	—	—
