= Indonesia at the 2021 Islamic Solidarity Games =

- IOC code: INA
- NOC: Indonesian Olympic Committee
- Website: www.nocindonesia.id (in Indonesian)

in Konya, Turkey
- Competitors: 82 in 13 sports
- Flag bearer: Osanando Naufal Khairudin
- Medals Ranked 7th: Gold 13 Silver 14 Bronze 29 Total 56

Islamic Solidarity Games appearances (overview)
- 2005; 2013; 2017; 2021; 2025

Indonesia participated in the 2021 Islamic Solidarity Games held in Konya, Turkey from 9 to 18 August 2022.

The games had been rescheduled several times. In May 2021, the ISSF postponed the event to August 2022 citing the COVID-19 pandemic situation in the participating countries.

== Competitors ==
The following is the list of number of competitors in the Games.

Sport	Men	Women	Total
Athletics	6	6	12
Archery	6	4	10
Cycling	2	1	3
Gymnastics	0	4	4
Kickboxing	1	2	3
Judo	3	1	4
Shooting	3	2	5
Swimming	6	6	12
Table tennis	1	1	2
Taekwondo	2	3	5
Weightlifting	6	6	12
Wrestling	0	4	4
Total	36	40	76

== Medalists ==
Medal	Name	Sport	Event	Date
(gold) Gold	Siti Nafisatul Hariroh	Weightlifting	Women's 45 kg – snatch	11 August
(gold) Gold	Siti Nafisatul Hariroh	Weightlifting	Women's 45 kg – clean & jerk	11 August
(gold) Gold	Siti Nafisatul Hariroh	Weightlifting	Women's 45 kg – total	11 August
(gold) Gold	Ricko Saputra	Weightlifting	Men's 61 kg – snatch	12 August
(gold) Gold	Ricko Saputra	Weightlifting	Men's 61 kg – clean & jerk	12 August
(gold) Gold	Ricko Saputra	Weightlifting	Men's 61 kg – total	12 August
(gold) Gold	Natasya Beteyob	Weightlifting	Women's 55 kg – clean & jerk	12 August
(gold) Gold	Natasya Beteyob	Weightlifting	Women's 55 kg – total	12 August
(gold) Gold	Rizki Juniansyah	Weightlifting	Men's 73 kg – snatch	13 August
(gold) Gold	Rizki Juniansyah	Weightlifting	Men's 73 kg – clean & jerk	13 August
(gold) Gold	Rizki Juniansyah	Weightlifting	Men's 73 kg – total	13 August
(gold) Gold	Tsabitha Alfiah Ramadani	Weightlifting	Women's 64 kg – snatch	13 August
(gold) Gold	Riau Ega Agata; Rezza Octavia	Archery	Mixed team recurve	17 August
(silver) Silver	Ayustina Delia Priatna	Cycling	Women's omnium	8 August
(silver) Silver	Natasya Beteyob	Weightlifting	Women's 55 kg – snatch	12 August
(silver) Silver	Mohammad Yasin	Weightlifting	Men's 67 kg – snatch	12 August
(silver) Silver	Nelly	Weightlifting	Women's 59 kg – clean & jerk	12 August
(silver) Silver	Rahmat Erwin Abdullah	Weightlifting	Men's 81 kg – clean and jerk	13 August
(silver) Silver	Rahmat Erwin Abdullah	Weightlifting	Men's 81 kg – total	13 August
(silver) Silver	Tsabitha Alfiah Ramadani	Weightlifting	Women's 64 kg – total	13 August
(silver) Silver	Restu Anggi	Weightlifting	Women's 71 kg – clean & jerk	14 August
(silver) Silver	Azzahra Permatahani; Prada Hanan Farmadini; Adinda Larasati Dewi Kirana; Angel Gabriella Yus	Swimming	Women's 4x200 m freestyle relay	14 August
(silver) Silver	Azzahra Permatahani; Prada Hanan Farmadini; Adinda Larasati Dewi Kirana; Angel Gabriella Yus	Swimming	Women's 4x100 m freestyle relay	16 August
(silver) Silver	Arif Dwi Pangestu; Riau Ega Agata; Alviyanto Prastyadi	Archery	Men's team recurve	17 August
(silver) Silver	Rezza Octavia; Pande Putu Gina Putri; Asiefa Nur Haenza	Archery	Women's team recurve	17 August
(silver) Silver	Deki Hastian Adika; Prima Wardhana Wisnu; Hendika Putra Pratama	Archery	Men's team compound	17 August
(silver) Silver	Arif Dwi Pangestu	Archery	Men's individual recurve	18 August
(bronze) Bronze	Eki Febri Ekawati	Athletics	Women's shot put	8 August
(bronze) Bronze	Satrio Adi Nugroho	Weightlifting	Men's 55 kg – snatch	11 August
(bronze) Bronze	Satrio Adi Nugroho	Weightlifting	Men's 55 kg – clean & jerk	11 August
(bronze) Bronze	Satrio Adi Nugroho	Weightlifting	Men's 55 kg – total	11 August
(bronze) Bronze	Emilia Nova	Athletics	Women's 100 m hurdles	11 August
(bronze) Bronze	Nelly	Weightlifting	Women's 59 kg – total	12 August
(bronze) Bronze	Tsabitha Alfiah Ramadani	Weightlifting	Women's 64 kg – clean & jerk	13 August
(bronze) Bronze	Azzahra Permatahani	Swimming	Women's 200 m individual medley	13 August
(bronze) Bronze	Izzy Dwifaiva Hefrisyanthi	Swimming	Women's 800 m freestyle	13 August
(bronze) Bronze	Restu Anggi	Weightlifting	Women's 71 kg – snatch	14 August
(bronze) Bronze	Restu Anggi	Weightlifting	Women's 71 kg – total	14 August
(bronze) Bronze	Aflah Fadlan Prawira	Swimming	Men's 1500 m freestyle	14 August
(bronze) Bronze	Adinda Larasati Dewi Kirana	Swimming	Women's 200 m butterfly	15 August
(bronze) Bronze	Nurul Akmal	Weightlifting	Women's +87 kg – snatch	15 August
(bronze) Bronze	Nurul Akmal	Weightlifting	Women's +87 kg – clean & jerk	15 August
(bronze) Bronze	Nurul Akmal	Weightlifting	Women's +87 kg – total	15 August
(bronze) Bronze	Izzy Dwifaiva Hefrisyanthi	Swimming	Women's 1500 m freestyle	15 August
(bronze) Bronze	Joe Aditya Wijaya Kurniawan; Erick Ahmad Fathoni; Aflah Fadlan Prawira; Farrel Armandio Tangkas	Swimming	Men's 4x200 m freestyle relay	15 August
(bronze) Bronze	Azzahra Permatahani	Swimming	Women's 400 m individual medley	16 August
(bronze) Bronze	Aflah Fadlan Prawira	Swimming	Men's 800 m freestyle	16 August
(bronze) Bronze	Prada Hanan Farmadini	Swimming	Women's 200 m freestyle	16 August
(bronze) Bronze	Ahmad Zigi Zaresta Yuda	Karate	Men's individual kata	17 August
(bronze) Bronze	Krisda Putri Aprilia	Karate	Women's individual kata	
(bronze) Bronze	Azzahra Permatahani	Swimming	Women's 200 breaststroke	17 August
(bronze) Bronze	Prada Hanan Farmadini	Swimming	Women's 400 m freestyle	17 August
(bronze) Bronze	Flairene Candrea Wonomiharjo; Azzahra Permatahani; Adinda Larasati Dewi Kirana; Angel Gabriella Yus	Swimming	Women's 4x100 m medley relay	17 August
(bronze) Bronze	Rezza Octavia	Archery	Women's individual recurve	18 August
(bronze) Bronze	Diandra Ariesta Pieter	Kickboxing	Women's 56 kg full contact	
(bronze) Bronze	Amanda La Loupatty	Kickboxing	Women's 52 kg low kick	

Medals by sport
Sport	gold	silver	bronze	Total
Weightlifting	12	7	10	29
Archery	1	4	1	6
Swimming	0	2	12	14
Cycling	0	1	0	1
Athletics	0	0	2	2
Karate	0	0	2	2
Kickboxing	0	0	2	2
Total	13	14	29	56

Medals by gender
Gender	1st place, gold medalist(s)	2nd place, silver medalist(s)	3rd place, bronze medalist(s)	Total
Female	6	8	22	36
Male	6	6	7	19
Mixed	1	0	0	1
Total	13	14	29	56

Medals by date
Day	Date	Gold medal	Silver medal	Bronze medal	Total
Day - 1	8 August	0	1	1	2
Day 0	9 August	Opening ceremony			
Day 1	10 August	0	0	0	0
Day 2	11 August	3	0	4	7
Day 2	12 August	5	3	1	9
Day 3	13 August	4	3	3	10
Day 4	14 August	0	2	3	5
Day 5	15 August	0	0	3	3
Day 6	16 August	0	1	4	7
Day 7	17 August	1	3	4	8
Day 8	18 August	0	1	1	2
Total		13	14	26	53

== Athletics (track and field) ==
Key

- Note–Ranks given for track events are within the athlete's heat only
- Q = Qualified for the next round
- q = Qualified for the next round as a fastest loser or, in field events, by position without achieving the qualifying target
- NR = National record
- N/A = Round not applicable for the event
- Bye = Athlete not required to compete in round

Men
Track and road events

Athlete	Event	Qualification		Semifinal		Final	
Athlete	Event	Result	Rank	Result	Rank	Result	Rank
Dewa Radika Syah	400 m	49.45	16	—N/a		Did not advance	
Ekhwan Nudin	800 m	02:03.33	18	—N/a		Did not advance	
Roby Syianturi	1500 m	4:03.10	16	—N/a		Did not advance	
Nofeldi Petingko	10000 m	—N/a				33:21.40	13
Halomoan Edwin Binsar	400 m hurdles	52.17	11	—N/a		Did not advance	

Field events

Athlete	Event	Qualification		Semifinal		Final	
Athlete	Event	Result	Rank	Result	Rank	Result	Rank
Abdul Hafiz	Javelin throw	—N/a				62.02	5

Women
Track and road events

Athlete	Event	Qualification		Semifinal		Final	
Athlete	Event	Result	Rank	Result	Rank	Result	Rank
Sri Maya Sari	400 m	54.23	3 Q	—N/a		54.67	4
Odekta Elvina Naibaho	10000 m	—N/a				35:52.19	7
Emilia Nova	100 m hurdles	13.70	5 Q	—N/a		13.59	3rd place, bronze medalist(s)

Field events

Athlete	Event	Qualification		Semifinal		Final	
Athlete	Event	Result	Rank	Result	Rank	Result	Rank
Maria Natalia Londa	Long jump	6.34	2 Q	—N/a		6.18	7
Maria Natalia Londa	Triple jump	—N/a				DNS	
Ni Made Eppi Wilantika	High jump	—N/a				1.65	11
Eki Febri Ekawati	Shot put	—N/a				14.93	3rd place, bronze medalist(s)

== Archery ==
=== Men ===
Recurve

Athlete	Event	Ranking round		Round of 64	Round of 32	Round of 16	Quarterfinals	Semifinals	Final / BM	
Athlete	Event	Score	Seed	Opposition Score	Opposition Score	Opposition Score	Opposition Score	Opposition Score	Opposition Score	Rank
Riau Ega Agatha	Men's Individual	665	3	Bye	O Alhammadi (UAE); W 6-0	O Ungalov (UZB); L 4-6	Did not advance			
Arif Dwi Pangestu	Men's Individual	659	5	Bye	Rusmadi (MAS); W 6-0	Almusa (KSA); W 6-4	Yıldırmış (TUR); W 6-5	Gazoz (TUR); W 6-4	Samet (TUR); L 5-6	2nd place, silver medalist(s)
Alviyanto Prastyadi	Men's Individual	657	7	Bye	Ting (MAS); W 6-0	Rubel (BAN); L 2-6	Did not advance			
Arif Dwi Pangestu; Riau Ega Agatha; Alviyanto Prastyadi	Men's Team	—N/a		Bye			Malaysia (MAS); W 6–0	Saudi Arabia (KSA); W 6–2	Turkey (TUR); L 2–6	2nd place, silver medalist(s)

Compound

Athlete	Event	Ranking round		Round of 64	Round of 32	Round of 16	Quarterfinals	Semifinals	Final / BM	
Athlete	Event	Score	Seed	Opposition Score	Opposition Score	Opposition Score	Opposition Score	Opposition Score	Opposition Score	Rank
Deki Hastian Adika	Men's Individual	688	1	Bye	Ashikuzzaman (BAN); L 143–146	Did not advance				
Prima Wardhana Wisnu	Men's Individual	687	2	Bye	Maras (TUR); W 145 (9+)–145 (9)	Haney (TUR); L 145–147	Did not advance			
Hendika Putra Pratama	Men's Individual	696	6	Bye	Malallah (KUW); L 141–142	Did not advance				
Deki Hastian Adika; Prima Wardhana Wisnu; Hendika Putra Pratama	Men's Team	—N/a		Bye			Qatar (QAT); W 233–213	Iran (IRI); W 233–231	Malaysia (MAS); L228–229	2nd place, silver medalist(s)

=== Women ===
Recurve

Athlete	Event	Ranking round		Round of 64	Round of 32	Round of 16	Quarterfinals	Semifinals	Final / BM	
Athlete	Event	Score	Seed	Opposition Score	Opposition Score	Opposition Score	Opposition Score	Opposition Score	Opposition Score	Rank
Rezza Octavia	Women's Individual	627	4	Bye	Fatoumata (GUI); W 6-0	Nasrin (BAN); W 7-1	Ziyadakhon (UZB); W 6-2	Yasemin (TUR); L 3-7	Azreena (MAS); W 7-1	3rd place, bronze medalist(s)
Asiefa Nur Haenza	Women's Individual	603	7	Bye	Fatima (UAE); W 6-4	Asli (TUR); L 2-6	Did not advance			
Pande Putu Gina Putri	Women's Individual	576	15	Bye	Aisyah (MAS); W 6-0	Gulnaz (TUR); L 0-6	Did not advance			
Rezza Octavia; Pande Putu Gina Putri; Asiefa Nur Haenza	Women's Team	—N/a		Bye			Kyrgyzstan (KGZ); W 6-2	Bangladesh (BAN); L 4-5	Turkey (TUR); L 0-6	2nd place, silver medalist(s)

Compound

Athlete	Event	Ranking round		Round of 64	Round of 32	Round of 16	Quarterfinals	Semifinals	Final / BM	
Athlete	Event	Score	Seed	Opposition Score	Opposition Score	Opposition Score	Opposition Score	Opposition Score	Opposition Score	Rank
Ratih Zilizati Fadhly	Women's Individual	673	7	Bye		Yaser (YEM); W 135–118	Suzer (TUR); L 138–147	Did not advance		

=== Mixed ===
Recurve

Athlete	Event	Ranking round		Round of 64	Round of 32	Round of 16	Quarterfinals	Semifinals	Final / BM	
Athlete	Event	Score	Seed	Opposition Score	Opposition Score	Opposition Score	Opposition Score	Opposition Score	Opposition Score	Rank
Riau Ega Agatha; Rezza Octavia	Mixed team	—N/a		Bye		Uganda (UGA); W 6-0	Malaysia (MAS); W 6-2	Iran (IRI); W 5-1	Turkey (TUR); W 5-1	1st place, gold medalist(s)

Compound

Athlete	Event	Ranking round		Round of 64	Round of 32	Round of 16	Quarterfinals	Semifinals	Final / BM	
Athlete	Event	Score	Seed	Opposition Score	Opposition Score	Opposition Score	Opposition Score	Opposition Score	Opposition Score	Rank
Putra Hendika Pratama; Fadhly Ratih Zilizati	Mixed team	—N/a		Bye				Iran (IRI); L 154-156	Malaysia (MAS); L 152-153	4

== Cycling ==
=== Road ===
Men

Athlete	Event	Time	Rank
Muhammad Abdurrohman	Men's Road race	42.36	37
Aiman Cahyadi	Men's Road race	42.43	24
Aiman Cahyadi	Men's Time trial	31:49.640	9
Muhammad Abdurrohman	Men's Time trial	32:01.426	11

Women

Athlete	Event	Time	Rank
Ayustina Delia Priatna	Women's Road race	2:36.04	5
Ayustina Delia Priatna	Women's Time Trial	22:51.733	4

=== Track ===
Pursuit

Athlete	Event	Qualification		Final	
Athlete	Event	Result	Rank	Result	Rank
Aiman Cahyadi	Men's individual pursuit	—N/a		04:32.623	9

Scratch

Athlete	Event	Qualification		Final	
Athlete	Event	Result	Rank	Result	Rank
Aiman Cahyadi	Men's scratch	—N/a		−1 LAP	11
Ayustina Delia Priatna	Women's scratch	—N/a		—N/a	6

Omnium

Athlete	Event	Race 1		Race 2		Race 3		Final	
Athlete	Event	Points	Rank	Points	Rank	Points	Rank	Points	Rank
Aiman Cahyadi	Men's omnium	—N/a	14	28	15	38	15	—N/a	15
Ayustina Delia Priatna	Women's omnium	—N/a	3	74	1	108	1	—N/a	2nd place, silver medalist(s)

== Gymnastics ==
=== Rhythmic ===
Individual

Athlete	Event	Qualification						Final					
Athlete	Event	Hoop	Ball	Clubs	Ribbon	Total	Rank	Hoop	Ball	Clubs	Ribbon	Total	Rank
Sutjiati Kelanaritma Narendra	Individual	25.550	26.050	24.700	24.400	100.700	—N/a	Did not advance					

=== Artistic ===
Women
Team

Athlete	Event	Final					
Athlete	Event	Apparatus				Total	Rank
Athlete	Event	F	UB	BB	V	Total	Rank
Nadia Indah Amalia; Muthia Nur Cahaya; Ameera Rahmajanni Hariadi	Team	12.150	17.500	10.600	10.100	50.350	5

Individual

Athlete	Event	Qualification						Final					
Athlete	Event	Apparatus				Total	Rank	Apparatus				Total	Rank
Athlete	Event	V	UB	BB	F	Total	Rank	V	UB	BB	F	Total	Rank
Nadia Indah Amalia	Uneven Bars	—N/a	7.700	—N/a		7.700	12	Did not advance					
Ameera Rahmajanni Hariadi	Vault	10.550	—N/a			10.550	5 Q	11.633	—N/a			11.633	5
Ameera Rahmajanni Hariadi	Uneven Bars	—N/a	9.800	—N/a		9.800	8 Q	—N/a	10.833	—N/a		10.833	5
Ameera Rahmajanni Hariadi	Balance Beam	—N/a		10.600	—N/a	10.600	9 Q	—N/a		9.767	—N/a	9.767	7
Ameera Rahmajanni Hariadi	Floor exercise	—N/a			10.100	10.100	10	Did not advance					

== Kickboxing ==
=== Full Contact ===
Women

Athlete	Event	Quarterfinal	Semifinal	Final	
Athlete	Event	Opposition Score	Opposition Score	Opposition Score	Rank
Diandra Ariesta Pieter	–56 kg	bye	Ayşe Karaca (TUR); L 0-3	Did not advance	3rd place, bronze medalist(s)

=== Low Kick ===
Men

Athlete	Event	Quarterfinal	Semifinal	Final	
Athlete	Event	Opposition Score	Opposition Score	Opposition Score	Rank
Abdul Aziz	–71 kg	Arzuman Gadimov (AZE); L 0-3	Did not advance		

Women

Athlete	Event	Quarterfinal	Semifinal	Final	
Athlete	Event	Opposition Score	Opposition Score	Opposition Score	Rank
Amanda La Loupatty	–52 kg	bye	Seham Al-Kharif (KUW); L 1-2	Did not advance	3rd place, bronze medalist(s)

== Judo ==
Athlete	Event	Round of 16	Quarterfinals	Semifinals	Repechage	Final / BM	
Athlete	Event	Opposition Result	Opposition Result	Opposition Result	Opposition Result	Opposition Result	Rank
Qori Amrullah Al Haq Nugraha	Men's 73 kg	V Jeddi (IRI); L	Did not advance				
Gege Ganding Kalbu Soethama	Men's 100 kg	—N/a	K Qaisar (PAK); L	Did not advance			
I Gede Agastya Darma Wardana	Men's +100 kg	—N/a	D Anong (CMR); W	N Mbagnick (SEN); L	Did not advance		
Syerina	Women's 63 kg	—N/a	O Seyma (TUR); L	Did not advance			

== Shooting ==
Men

Athlete	Event	Qualification		Final	
Athlete	Event	Points	Rank	Points	Rank
Anas Muhsinun Joko Santoso	Trap	63	30	Did not advance	
Nanda Suhelmi	Trap	62	32	Did not advance	
Nasrudin	Skeet	63	32	Did not advance	

Women

Athlete	Event	Qualification		Final	
Athlete	Event	Points	Rank	Points	Rank
Fanny Febriana Wulandari	Trap	68	8	Did not advance	
Adylia Safitri	Trap	63	18	Did not advance	

Mixed

Athlete	Event	Qualification		Final	
Athlete	Event	Points	Rank	Points	Rank
Anas Muhsinun Joko Santoso; Nanda Suhelmi; Fanny Febriana Wulandari; Adylia Safitri	Trap	126	10	Did not advance	

== Swimming ==
=== Men ===
Athlete	Event	Preliminary Round		Semifinal		Final	
Athlete	Event	Time	Rank	Time	Rank	Time	Rank
Joe Aditya Kurniawan	100 m freestyle	52.65	9 Q	52.06	8	Did not advance	
Erick Ahmad Fathoni	100 m freestyle	53.40	13 Q	53.15	11	Did not advance	
Erick Ahmad Fathoni	200 m freestyle	1:55.72	8 Q	—N/a		1:55.25	7
Joe Aditya Kurniawan	200 m freestyle	1:53.72	3 Q	—N/a		1:52.55	4
Aflah Fadlan Prawira	400 m freestyle	4:08.51	4 Q	—N/a		4:06.78	4
Aflah Fadlan Prawira	800 m freestyle	—N/a				8:24.18	3rd place, bronze medalist(s)
Aflah Fadlan Prawira	1500 m freestyle	—N/a				16:14.82	3rd place, bronze medalist(s)
Farrel Armandio Tangkas	50 m backstroke	27.51	12 Q	27.41	12	Did not advance	
I Gede Siman Sudartawa	50 m backstroke	26.50	6 Q	26.19	4 Q	26.06	4
I Gede Siman Sudartawa	100 m backstroke	58.90	6 Q	57.93	7	Did not advance	
Farrel Armando Tangkas	100 m backstroke	59.28	9 Q	58.21	9	Did not advance	
Farrel Armando Tangkas	200 m backstroke	2:08.71	5 Q	—N/a		2:08.92	5
Gagarin Nathaniel	50 m breaststroke	28.91	8 Q	28.93	8 Q	29.19	8
Gagarin Nathaniel	100 m breaststroke	1:06.20	9 Q	1:03.96	7 Q	1:03.68	8
Erick Ahmad Fathoni	50 m butterfly	24.04	14	—N/a		Did not advance	
Joe Aditya Kurniawan	100 m butterfly	—N/a		54.99	3 Q	55.40	8
Joe Aditya Kurniawan	200 m butterfly	2:20.40	9	—N/a		Did not advance	
Erick Ahmad Fathoni	200 m individual medley	2:31.43	9	—N/a		Did not advance	
Aflah Fadlan Prawira; Joe Aditya Kurniawan	4×100 m freestyle relay	3:33.26	6 Q	—N/a		3:29.04	5
Joe Aditya Kurniawan; Aflah Fadlan Prawira; Erick Ahmad Fathoni; Farrel Armandio Tangkas	4×200 m freestyle relay	—N/a				7:37.97	3rd place, bronze medalist(s)
Joe Aditya Kurniawan; Aflah Fadlan Prawira; Erick Ahmad Fathoni; Farrel Armandio Tangkas	4×100 m medley relay	—N/a				3:48.75	6

=== Women ===
Athlete	Event	Preliminary Round		Semifinal		Final	
Athlete	Event	Time	Rank	Time	Rank	Time	Rank
Angel Gabriella Yus	50 m freestyle	27:54	7	Did not advance			
Adinda Larasati Dewi Kirana	100 m freestyle	1:00.52	8	Did not advance			
Prada Hanan Farmadini	100 m freestyle	59.80	6	Did not advance			
Prada Hanan Farmadini	200 m freestyle	2:11.48	3 Q	—N/a		2:08.31	3rd place, bronze medalist(s)
Izzy Dwifaifa Hefrisyanthi	200 m freestyle	2:14.40	7 Q	—N/a		2:13.41	7
Izzy Dwifaifa Hefrisyanthi	400 m freestyle	4:38.11	3 Q	—N/a		4:33.42	3rd place, bronze medalist(s)
Prada Hanan Farmadini	400 m freestyle	4:41.78	5 Q	—N/a		4:42.99	5
Prada Hanan Farmadini	800 m freestyle	—N/a				9:32.69	4
Izzy Dwifaifa Hefrisyanthi	800 m freestyle	—N/a				9:22.22	3rd place, bronze medalist(s)
Izzy Dwifaifa Hefrisyanthi	1500 m freestyle	—N/a				18:04.58	3rd place, bronze medalist(s)
Angel Gabriella Yus	50 m backstroke	30.51	4	—N/a		Did not advance	
Flairene Candrea	50 m backstroke	30.79	6 Q	—N/a		31.01	6
Flairene Candrea	100 m backstroke	33.59	5	—N/a		1:04.92	5
Angel Gabriella Yus	100 m backstroke	—N/a				1:04.69	4
Angel Gabriella Yus	50 m butterfly	—N/a				28.53	7
Adinda Larasati Dewi Kirana	100 m butterfly	1:03.97	2 Q	—N/a		1:03.86	5
Adinda Larasati Dewi Kirana	200 m butterfly	—N/a				2:21.39	3rd place, bronze medalist(s)
Azzahra Permatahani	200 m individual medley	—N/a				1:06.46	3rd place, bronze medalist(s)
Azzahra Permatahani	400 m individual medley	—N/a				5:06.96	3rd place, bronze medalist(s)
Azzahra Permatahani; Prada Hanan Farmadini; Angel Gabriella Yus; Adinda Larasati Dewi Kirana	4×100 m freestyle	—N/a				3:57.54	2nd place, silver medalist(s)
Azzahra Permatahani; Prada Hanan Farmadini; Angel Gabriella Yus; Adinda Larasati Dewi Kirana	4×200 m freestyle	—N/a				8:43.34	2nd place, silver medalist(s)
Azzahra Permatahani; Flairene Candrea; Angel Gabriella Yus; Adinda Larasati Dewi Kirana	4×100 m freestyle	—N/a				4:23.99	3rd place, bronze medalist(s)

== Table tennis ==
Singles

Athletes	Event	Elimination			Quarterfinal	Semifinal	Final / BM	
Athletes	Event	Opposition Score	Opposition Score	Opposition Score	Opposition Score	Opposition Score	Opposition Score	Rank
Rafanael Nikola Niman	Men's singles	B Alanssari (KUW); W 3–0	A Alkhadrawi (KSA); L 0–3	Did not advance				
Siti Aminah	Women's singles	S Altinkaya (TUR); L 0–3	Did not advance					

== Taekwondo ==
Athlete	Event	Round of 32	Round of 16	Quarterfinals	Semifinals	Repechage	Final / BM	
Athlete	Event	Opposition Result	Opposition Result	Opposition Result	Opposition Result	Opposition Result	Opposition Result	Rank
Muhammad Bassam Raihan	Men's 63 kg	—N/a	S Abdirashev (KAZ); W	H Reçber (TUR); L	Did not advance			
Osanando Naufal Khairudin	Men's 74 kg	—N/a	A Bahlool (PLE); L	Did not advance				
Ni Kadek Heni Prikasih	Women's 46 kg	—N/a	M Qabaha (PLE); W	S Sahib (MAR); L	Did not advance			
Megawati Tamesti Maheswari	Women's 53 kg	—N/a	B Habib (LBN); W	Z Ağrıs (TUR); L	Did not advance			
Silvana Lamanda	Women's 67 kg	—N/a	F Yergeshova (KAZ); L	Did not advance				

== Weightlifting ==
Men

Athlete	Event	Snatch		Clean & jerk		Total	
Athlete	Event	Result	Rank	Result	Rank	Result	Rank
Satrio Adi Nugroho	55 kg	110	3rd place, bronze medalist(s)	134	3rd place, bronze medalist(s)	244	3rd place, bronze medalist(s)
Ricko Saputra	61 kg	128	1st place, gold medalist(s)	163	1st place, gold medalist(s)	291	1st place, gold medalist(s)
Mohammad Yasin	67 kg	140	2nd place, silver medalist(s)	160	7	300	4
Rizki Juniansyah	73 kg	150	1st place, gold medalist(s)	190	1st place, gold medalist(s)	340	1st place, gold medalist(s)
Rahmat Erwin Abdullah	81 kg	158	4	197	2nd place, silver medalist(s)	355	2nd place, silver medalist(s)
Muhammad Zul Ilmi	89 kg	155	8	—N/a		155	DNF

Women

Athlete	Event	Snatch		Clean & jerk		Total	
Athlete	Event	Result	Rank	Result	Rank	Result	Rank
Siti Nafisatul Hariroh	45 kg	88	1st place, gold medalist(s)	71	1st place, gold medalist(s)	159	1st place, gold medalist(s)
Natasya Beteyob	55 kg	84	2nd place, silver medalist(s)	111	1st place, gold medalist(s)	195	1st place, gold medalist(s)
Nelly	59 kg	86	4	111	2nd place, silver medalist(s)	197	3rd place, bronze medalist(s)
Tsabitah Alfiah Ramadani	64 kg	98	1st place, gold medalist(s)	116	3rd place, bronze medalist(s)	214	2nd place, silver medalist(s)
Restu Anggi	71 kg	90	3rd place, bronze medalist(s)	120	2nd place, silver medalist(s)	210	3rd place, bronze medalist(s)
Nurul Akmal	+87 kg	113	3rd place, bronze medalist(s)	142	3rd place, bronze medalist(s)	255	3rd place, bronze medalist(s)

== Wrestling ==
Women

Athlete	Event	Group stage			Quarterfinal	Semifinal	Final / BM	
Athlete	Event	Opposition Result	Opposition Result	Rank	Opposition Result	Opposition Result	Opposition Result	Rank
Candra Marimar	Freestyle −53 kg	—N/a			L Gurbanova (AZE); L 2−6^{F}	Did not advance	R Ari (TUR); L 2−6^{F}	—N/a
Kharisma Tantri Herlina	Freestyle −62 kg	—N/a			F Camara (GUI); L 1−12	Did not advance	T Omelchenko (AZE); L 0−11	—N/a
Varadisa Septi Putri Hidayat	Freestyle −76 kg	A Youin (CIV); L 0–4 SU	A Medet (KGZ); L 1–3 PO1	3	Did not advance			
