= Swimming at the 2021 Islamic Solidarity Games =

Swimming competition

- Venue: Konya Olympic Swimming Pool
- Dates: 7–17 August 2022

The swimming competition at the 2021 Islamic Solidarity Games was held in Konya, Turkey from 13 to 17 August 2022 in Konya Olympic Swimming Pool. The Para Swimming competitions was held on 7–11 August 2022 at the Konya Olympic Swimming Pool.

The Games were originally scheduled to take place from 20 to 29 August 2021. In May 2020, the Islamic Solidarity Sports Federation (ISSF), who are responsible for the direction and control of the Islamic Solidarity Games, postponed the games as the 2020 Summer Olympics were postponed to July and August 2021, due to the global COVID-19 pandemic.

== Medal table ==
* Host nation (Turkey)

Rank	Nation	Gold	Silver	Bronze	Total
1	Turkey (TUR)*	29	26	11	66
2	Kazakhstan (KAZ)	4	1	7	12
3	Uzbekistan (UZB)	2	5	5	12
4	Algeria (ALG)	2	1	0	3
5	Azerbaijan (AZE)	1	1	1	3
6	Kuwait (KUW)	1	1	0	2
7	Kyrgyzstan (KGZ)	1	0	2	3
8	Indonesia (INA)	0	2	12	14
9	Sudan (SUD)	0	1	1	2
10	Cameroon (CMR)	0	1	0	1
10	Uganda (UGA)	0	1	0	1
12	Iran (IRI)	0	0	1	1
Totals (12 entries)		40	40	40	120

== Medal summary ==
=== Men ===
Event	Gold		Silver		Bronze	
50 m freestyle	Emre Sakçı; Turkey	22.38	Khurshidjon Tursunov; Uzbekistan	22.51 NR	Aleksey Tarasenko; Uzbekistan	22.72
100 m freestyle	Aleksey Tarasenko; Uzbekistan	49.54	Khurshidjon Tursunov; Uzbekistan	49.61	Emre Sakçı; Turkey	50.00
200 m freestyle	Baturalp Ünlü; Turkey	1:49.62 GR	Aleksey Tarasenko; Uzbekistan	1:50.01	Batuhan Filiz; Turkey	1:50.45
400 m freestyle	Yiğit Aslan; Turkey	3:52.98 GR	Batuhan Filiz; Turkey	3:56.59	Egor Petryakov; Uzbekistan	4:01.06
800 m freestyle	Mert Kılavuz; Turkey	8:06.30	Yiğit Aslan; Turkey	8:15.90	Aflah Fadlan Prawira; Indonesia	8:24.18
1500 m freestyle	Mert Kılavuz; Turkey	15:31.12	Yiğit Aslan; Turkey	15:54.33	Aflah Fadlan Prawira; Indonesia	16:14.82
50 m backstroke	Ali Al-Zamil; Kuwait	25.45 NR	Mert Ali Satır; Turkey	25.59	Doruk Tekin; Turkey	25.95
100 m backstroke	Berke Saka; Turkey	55.27	Mert Ali Satır; Turkey	55.76	Ziyad Ahmed; Sudan	55.78
200 m backstroke	Berke Saka; Turkey	2:01.40 GR	Ziyad Ahmed; Sudan	2:03.69	Melikşah Düğen; Turkey	2:03.90
50 m breaststroke	Emre Sakçı; Turkey	27.36 GR	Berkay Ömer Öğretir; Turkey	27.75	Denis Petrashov; Kyrgyzstan	27.92
100 m breaststroke	Denis Petrashov; Kyrgyzstan	1:00.54 GR	Berkay Ömer Öğretir; Turkey	1:00.68	Emre Sakçı; Turkey	1:01.20
200 m breaststroke	Berkay Ömer Öğretir; Turkey	2:11.92 GR	Demirkan Demir; Turkey	2:12.01	Denis Petrashov; Kyrgyzstan	2:13.18
50 m butterfly	Adilbek Mussin; Kazakhstan	23.50 GR, NR	Waleed Abdulrazzaq; Kuwait	23.66 NR	Ümitcan Güreş; Turkey	23.97
100 m butterfly	Adilbek Mussin; Kazakhstan	53.20	Ümitcan Güreş; Turkey	53.45	Eldorbek Usmonov; Uzbekistan	53.79
200 m butterfly	Ramil Valizada; Azerbaijan	1:58.26	Jaouad Syoud; Algeria	2:00.65	Kaan Ozcan; Turkey	2:01.32
200 m individual medley	Jaouad Syoud; Algeria	2:00.91 GR	Sanberk Yiğit Oktar; Turkey	2:01.87	Berke Saka; Turkey	2:02.35
400 m individual medley	Jaouad Syoud; Algeria	4:23.34	Kaan Korkmaz; Turkey	4:26.74	Egor Petryakov; Uzbekistan	4:27.15
4×100 m freestyle relay	Turkey; Emre Gürdenli (50.48); Doğa Çelik (50.64); Baturalp Ünlü (49.68); Emre Sakçı (49.80)	3:20.60 GR	Uzbekistan; Aleksey Tarasenko (50.00); Eldorbek Usmonov (52.03); Oybekjon Khujaev (51.81); Khurshidjon Tursunov (48.41)	3:22.25 NR	Iran; Sina Gholampour (51.68); Samyar Abdoli (50.78); Alireza Yavari (49.92); Matin Sohran (50.08)	3:22.46 NR
4×200 m freestyle relay	Turkey; Efe Turan (1:53.65); Yiğit Aslan (1:52.23); Batuhan Filiz (1:50.27); Baturalp Ünlü (1:49.88)	7:26.03 GR	Uzbekistan; Aleksey Tarasenko (1:50.79); Olimjon Adilov (1:53.88); Egor Petryakov (1:53.73); Khurshidjon Tursunov (1:52.17)	7:30.57	Indonesia; Joe Aditya Wijaya Kurniawan (1:53.31); Erick Ahmad Fathoni (1:54.43); Farrel Armandio Tangkas (); Aflah Fadlan Prawira ()	7:37.97
4×100 m medley relay	Uzbekistan; Aleksey Tarasenko (57.69); Vladislav Mustafin (1:01.00); Eldorbek Usmonov (53.12); Khurshidjon Tursunov (48.62)	3:40.43 GR, NR	Turkey; Berke Saka (55.26); Berkay Ömer Öğretir (1:00.81); Ümitcan Güreş (54.43); Emre Sakçı (50.02)	3:40.52	Kazakhstan; Yegor Popov (57.73); Aibek Kamzenov (1:02.85); Adilbek Mussin (52.65); Alexander Varakin (50.06)	3:43.29

=== Women ===
Event	Gold		Silver		Bronze	
50 m freestyle	İlknur Nihan Çakıcı; Turkey	25.90 GR	Kirabo Namutebi; Uganda	26.42 NR	Sezin Eligül; Turkey	26.51
100 m freestyle	İlknur Nihan Çakıcı; Turkey	57.20	Norah Milanesi; Cameroon	58.42	Daniela Dyu; Kazakhstan	58.80
200 m freestyle	Merve Tuncel; Turkey	2:02.09 GR	Beril Böcekler; Turkey	2:04.36	Prada Hanan Farmadini; Indonesia	2:08.32
400 m freestyle	Merve Tuncel; Turkey	4:12.93 GR	Beril Böcekler; Turkey	4:17.69	Prada Hanan Farmadini; Indonesia	4:33.42
800 m freestyle	Merve Tuncel; Turkey	8:40.14 GR	Deniz Ertan; Turkey	8:46.44	Izzy Dwifaiva Hefrisyanthi; Indonesia	9:22.22
1500 m freestyle	Merve Tuncel; Turkey	16:27.63 GR	Deniz Ertan; Turkey	16:33.26	Izzy Dwifaiva Hefrisyanthi; Indonesia	18:04.58
50 m backstroke	Ekaterina Avramova; Turkey	28.63	Sezin Eligül; Turkey	29.18	Kseniya Ignatova; Kazakhstan	30.06
100 m backstroke	Ekaterina Avramova; Turkey	1:01.47 GR	Sudem Denizli; Turkey	1:02.61	Kseniya Ignatova; Kazakhstan	1:03.36
200 m backstroke	Ekaterina Avramova; Turkey	2:12.44 GR	Sudem Denizli; Turkey	2:14.32	Kseniya Ignatova; Kazakhstan	2:15.76
50 m breaststroke	Adelaida Pchelintseva; Kazakhstan	31.71 GR	Viktoriya Zeynep Güneş; Turkey	32.03	Gülşen Samancı; Turkey	32.18
100 m breaststroke	Viktoriya Zeynep Güneş; Turkey	1:08.96	Hazal Özkan; Turkey	1:10.28	Adelaida Pchelintseva; Kazakhstan	1:11.08
200 m breaststroke	Viktoriya Zeynep Güneş; Turkey	2:29.55	Defne Coşkun; Turkey	2:30.12	Azzahra Permatahani; Indonesia	2:41.28
50 m butterfly	Sofiya Abubakirova; Kazakhstan	27.17	Maryam Sheikhalizadehkhanghah; Azerbaijan	27.25	Aleyna Özkan; Turkey	27.42
100 m butterfly	Deniz Ertan; Turkey	1:01.00 GR	Nida Eliz Üstündağ; Turkey	1:02.03	Maryam Sheikhalizadehkhanghah; Azerbaijan	1:02.24
200 m butterfly	Defne Taçyıldız; Turkey	2:14.62	Nida Eliz Üstündağ; Turkey	2:15.81	Adinda Larasati Kirana; Indonesia	2:21.39
200 m individual medley	Viktoriya Zeynep Güneş; Turkey	2:15.92	Deniz Ertan; Turkey	2:18.24	Azzahra Permatahani; Indonesia	2:20.87
400 m individual medley	Deniz Ertan; Turkey	4:47.60	Viktoriya Zeynep Güneş; Turkey	4:56.42	Azzahra Permatahani; Indonesia	5:06.96
4×100 m freestyle relay	Turkey; İlknur Nihan Çakıcı (57.71); Sezin Eligül (58.29); Merve Tuncel (58.61); Viktoriya Zeynep Güneş (57.60)	3:52:21	Indonesia; Azzahra Permatahani (1:00.10); Prada Hanan Farmadini (58.70); Adinda Larasati Dewi (58.96); Angel Gabriella Yus (59.78)	3:57.54	Kazakhstan; Xeniya Ignatova (1:00.00); Adelaida Pchelintseva (1:02.46); Sofiya Abubakirova (58.38); Daniela Dyu (58.94)	3:59.78
4×200 m freestyle relay	Turkey; Ecem Dönmez (2:04.01); Deniz Ertan (2:05.27); Merve Tuncel (2:04.89); Beril Böcekler (2:06.43)	8:20.60	Indonesia; Azzahra Permatahani (2:10.01); Prada Hanan Farmadini (2:09.26); Adinda Larasati Dewi (2:10.80); Angel Gabriella Yus (2:13.27)	8:43.34	Uzbekistan; Afsona Niyazova (2:14.16); Alyona Vasileva (2:16.63); Sitora Odilova (2:17.46); Ulyana Nazmutdinova (2:21.42)	9:09.67
4×100 m medley relay	Turkey; Ekaterina Avramova (1:01.71); Viktoriya Zeynep Güneş (1:09.17); Deniz Ertan (1:02.64); İlknur Nihan Çakıcı (58.00)	4:11.52 GR	Kazakhstan; Xeniya Ignatova (1:04.79); Adelaida Pchelintseva (1:11.82); Daniela Dyu (1:03.33); Sofiya Abubakirova (59.20)	4:19.14	Indonesia; Flairene Candrea (1:06.21); Azzahra Permatahani (1:14.62); Adinda Larasati Dewi (1:03.89); Angel Gabriella Yus (59.27)	4:23.99

== Para swimming ==
=== Medal table ===
* Host nation (Turkey)

Rank	Nation	Gold	Silver	Bronze	Total
1	Turkey (TUR)*	12	9	8	29
2	Iran (IRI)	5	6	4	15
3	Uganda (UGA)	2	3	1	6
4	Uzbekistan (UZB)	2	2	2	6
5	Saudi Arabia (KSA)	0	0	1	1
Totals (5 entries)		21	20	16	57

=== Men ===
Event	Gold	Silver	Bronze
50 m freestyle (S4-S10)	Shahin Izadyar; Iran	Sina Zeighaminejad; Iran	Koral Berkin Kutlu; Turkey
100 m freestyle (S4-S10)	Koral Berkin Kutlu; Turkey	Sina Zeighaminejad; Iran	Shahin Izadyar; Iran
200 m freestyle (S4-S5)	Koral Berkin Kutlu; Turkey	Hamit Demir; Turkey	Mohammad Karimzadeh; Iran
400 m freestyle (S6-S10)	Sina Zeighaminejad; Iran	Shahin Izadyar; Iran	Uğur Şenel; Turkey
50 m backstroke (S4-S5)	Beytullah Eroğlu; Turkey	Bakhtiyorjon Ortikov; Uzbekistan	Hamit Demir; Turkey
100 m backstroke (S6-S10)	Shahin Izadyar; Iran	Azizbek Boynazarov; Uzbekistan	Abolfazl Zarif; Iran
50 m butterfly (S5-S7)	Koral Berkin Kutlu; Turkey	Beytullah Eroğlu; Turkey	Ibrahim Al-Marzouqi; Saudi Arabia
100 m butterfly (S8-S10)	Azizbek Boynazarov; Uzbekistan	Sina Zeighaminejad; Iran	Sultonbek Nuriddinov; Uzbekistan
100 m breaststroke (SB4-SB9)	Sina Zeighaminejad; Iran	Shahin Izadyar; Iran	Azizbek Boynazarov; Uzbekistan
150 m individual medley (SM4)	Mohammad Karimzadeh; Iran	Hamit Demir; Turkey	None awarded
200 m individual medley (SM5-SM10)	Azizbek Boynazarov; Uzbekistan	Shahin Izadyar; Iran	Sina Zeighaminejad; Iran

=== Women ===
Event	Gold	Silver	Bronze
50 m freestyle (S4-S10)	Sevilay Öztürk; Turkey	Husnah Kukundakwe; Uganda	Emine Avcu; Turkey
100 m freestyle (S4-S10)	Sümeyye Boyacı; Turkey	Sevilay Öztürk; Turkey	Husnah Kukundakwe; Uganda
200 m freestyle (S4-S5)	Sümeyye Boyacı; Turkey	Sevilay Öztürk; Turkey	Emine Avcu; Turkey
400 m freestyle (S6-S10)	Şevval Beren Mutlu; Turkey	Husnah Kukundakwe; Uganda	None awarded
50 m backstroke (S4-S5)	Sümeyye Boyacı; Turkey	Sevilay Öztürk; Turkey	Emine Avcu; Turkey
100 m backstroke (S6-S10)	Şevval Beren Mutlu; Turkey	Husnah Kukundakwe; Uganda	None awarded
50 m butterfly (S5-S7)	Sevilay Öztürk; Turkey	Emine Avcu; Turkey	Sümeyye Boyacı; Turkey
100 m breaststroke (SB4-SB9)	Husnah Kukundakwe; Uganda	Şevval Beren Mutlu; Turkey	Meryem Nur Tunuğ; Turkey
150 m individual medley (SM4)	Emine Avcu; Turkey	None awarded	None awarded
200 m individual medley (SM5-SM10)	Husnah Kukundakwe; Uganda	Şevval Beren Mutlu; Turkey	None awarded

== Participating nations ==
=== Swimming ===
197 swimmers from 36 countries participated:

1. Afghanistan (2)
2. Albania (2)
3. Algeria (1)
4. Azerbaijan (11)
5. Bangladesh (2)
6. Benin (1)
7. Brunei (1)
8. Burkina Faso (2)
9. Cameroon (2)
10. Comoros (2)
11. Djibouti (3)
12. Gabon (1)
13. The Gambia (2)
14. Guinea (2)
15. Indonesia (12)
16. Iran (9)
17. Jordan (3)
18. Kazakhstan (10)
19. Kuwait (7)
20. Kyrgyzstan (6)
21. Maldives (12)
22. Mozambique (1)
23. Niger (1)
24. Oman (3)
25. Pakistan (6)
26. Palestine (3)
27. Qatar (4)
28. Saudi Arabia (2)
29. Senegal (5)
30. Sudan (14)
31. Suriname (2)
32. Turkey (36)
33. Turkmenistan (5)
34. Uganda (4)
35. United Arab Emirates (5)
36. Uzbekistan (13)

=== Para swimming ===
1. Algeria
2. Azerbaijan (1)
3. Iran (5)
4. Morocco
5. Saudi Arabia (2)
6. Turkey
7. Uganda (1)
8. Uzbekistan (4)
