= Toker =

Toker may refer to:

- One who smokes cannabis (slang)
- Toker (rapper), a member of the Chicano rap group Brownside

== Surname ==
- Cem Toker (born 1957), leader of the Liberal Democratic Party in Turkey
- Franklin Toker (1944–2021), professor of the History of Art and Architecture
- Irfan Toker (born 1972), Turkish judoka
- Metin Toker (1924–2002), Turkish journalist and writer
- Nehir Toker (born 2005), Turkish female swimmer

== Other uses ==
- Toker Dam, located in Eritrea
