= Nehir (name) =

Female given name of Turkish origin

Nehir is a Turkish female given name and surname that means river; derived from the Arabic word "nehr" (نهر).

Nehir, meaning stream, river, is also a Turkish feminine given name. It may refer to:

- Nehir Erdoğan (born 1980), Turkish actress
- Nehir Toker (born 2005), Turkish swimmer
