= Enka SK =

Enka Spor
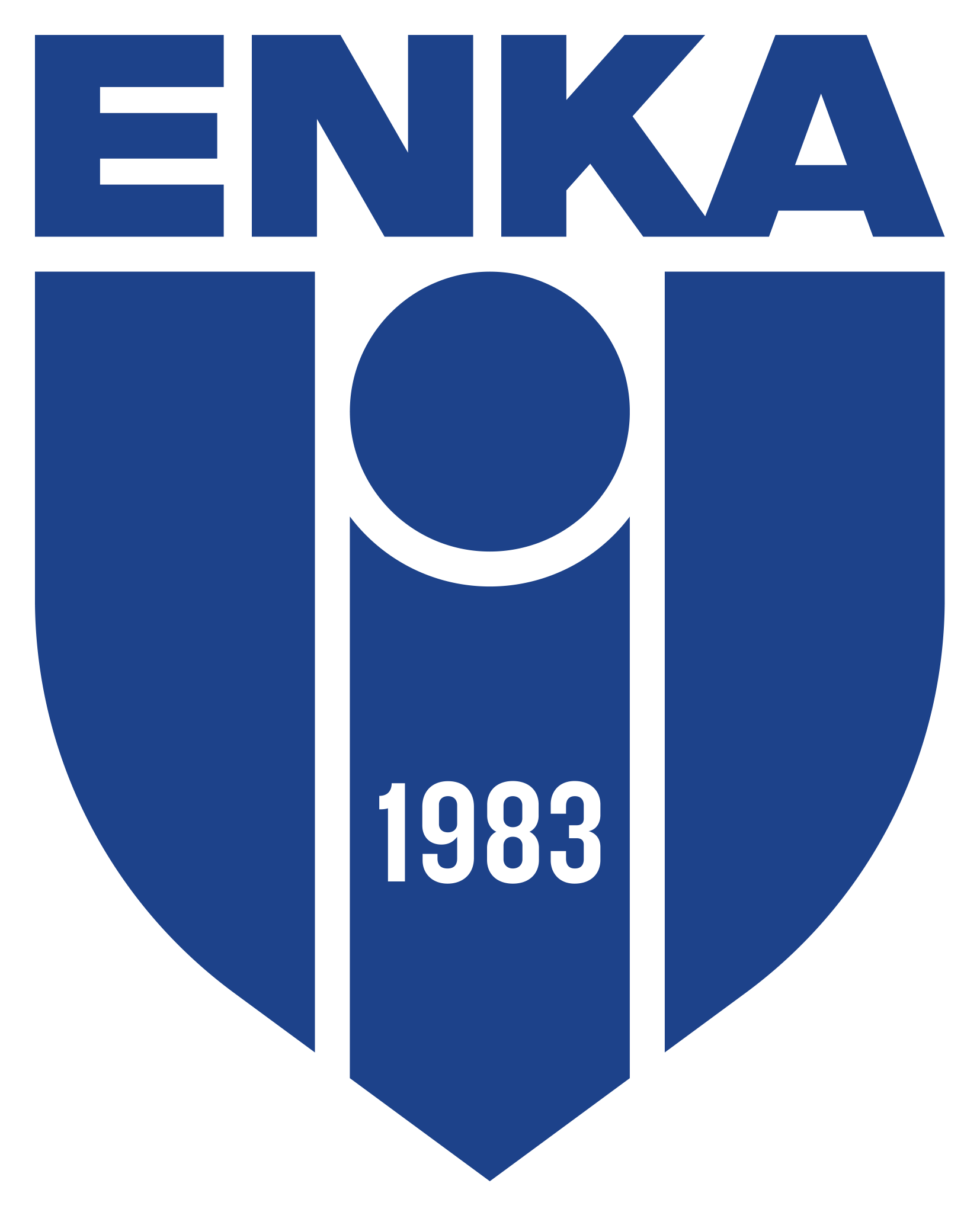
- Full name: Enka Spor Kulübü
- Founded: 1983
- Ground: Sadi Gülçelik Sport Complex, İstinye, Sarıyer, Istanbul
- Owner: Enka Foundation
- President: Alparslan Tansuğ
- Website: http://www.enkaspor.com/

Enkaspor (Turkish: Enka Spor Kulübü) is a multi-sports club established in 1983 in Istanbul, Turkey by the Turkish construction conglomerate Enka Construction Co.

Enkaspor's main activities are in athletics, water polo, tennis and swimming with 353 women and 467 men in active sport as of December 2010.

== Facilities ==
Sports facilities of the club are situated within the Sadi Gülçelik Sport Complex stretching over 120,000 m^{2} (12 ha) land located in İstinye neighborhood of Sarıyer district in Istanbul. There are

- one athletics field with six tartan tracks,
- one multi-purpose arena consisting of
  - three basketball, volleyball or handball halls,
  - one olympic-size swimming pool, which can be covered in the winter time,
  - a semi-olympic size covered swimming pool,
  - a covered 12-lane swimming and water polo pool,
  - 12 tennis courts: six training courts of which four can be covered, two open and three covered tennis courts.

== Athletics ==
=== Sportspeople ===
Enkaspor played a leading role in bringing talented foreign athletes into Turkey. Elvan Abeylegesse, Anzhela Atroshchenko, Sviatlana Sudak and Alemitu Bekele are sportspeople, who were gained to compete successfully at international events for Turkey.

Many members of Enkaspor are holder of Turkish national records in their branch.

=== Team achievements ===
2010

- Senior men Turkey champion
- Senior women Turkey champion
- Junior men Turkey runner-up
- Junior women Turkey runner-up

== Notable sportspeople ==
Swimming

- Yiğit Aslan (born 2004), freestyle swimmer
- Beril Böcekler (born 2004), female freestyle swimmer
- Viktoriya Zeynep Güneş (born 1998), female swimmer of Ukrainian origin
- Sudem Denizli (born 2005), female backstroke swimmer
- Defne Tanığ (born 2007) female butterfly stroke swimmer
- Belis Şakar (born 2007), freestyle and butterfly swimmer
- Merve Tuncel (born 2005) female freestyle swimmer

Tennis

- Çağla Büyükakçay - The first Turkish woman tennis player in singles to play Grand Slam qualification tournament (2010 US Open) and win a WTA singles title (2016 Istanbul Cup)
- Melis Sezer - The first Turkish junior woman tennis player to compete in Wimbledon, US and Australia Open tournaments
- İpek Soylu - Tennis player winner of the 2016 WTA Elite Trophy

Track and field

- Elvan Abeylegesse - 2010 European champion in 10,000 m and silver medalist in 5,000 m.
- Büşra Akay (born 2005), sprinter
- Meryem Akda - 3000 m steeplechase and 5000 m runner.
- Ramazan Baştuğ (born 2000), long-distance runner
- Meryem Bekmez (born 2000), race walker
- Yasemin Can - long-distance runner.
- Tuğba Danışmaz (born 1999), long jump and triple jump athlete
- Evin Demir (born 2001), race walker
- Sıla Koloğlu (born 2004), sprinter
- Elif Polat (born 1999), sprinter
- Simay Özçiftçi (born 2003), sprinter
- Binnaz Uslu - 2010 European silver medalist in cross country. Gold medalist at the 2011 Universiade in 3,000 m steeplechase and 5,000 m.
- Pınar Saka - 400 m runner
- Merve Aydın - 800 m runner
- Buse Savaşkan (born 1999), high jumpğ
- Aysel Önder (born 2005), Paralympian sprinter indoor world champion and indoor world record holder in 400 m T20 event.
- Can Özüpek (born 1996), triple jumper

Wrestling

- Mehlika Öztürk, freestyle
