= Sudem Denizli =

Turkish swimmer (born 2005)

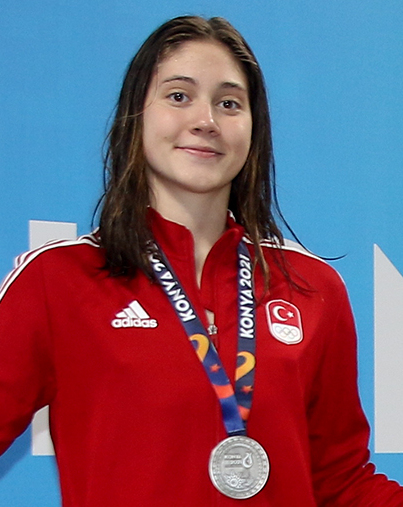
- Sudem Denizli (August 2022)

Personal information
- National team: Turkey
- Born: 15 August 2005 (age 21) Eskişehir, Turkey

Sport
- Sport: Swimming
- Strokes: Backstroke
- Club: Galatasaray Swimming
Medal record
Women's swimming
Representing Turkey
Islamic Solidarity Games
Gold medal – first place	2025 Riyadh	50 m backstroke
Gold medal – first place	2025 Riyadh	100 m backstroke
Gold medal – first place	2025 Riyadh	200 m backstroke
Gold medal – first place	2025 Riyadh	200 m individual medley
Gold medal – first place	2025 Riyadh	4 x 100 m freestyle
Gold medal – first place	2025 Riyadh	4 x 100 m medley
Silver medal – second place	2021 Konya	200 m backstroke
Mediterranean Games
Bronze medal – third place	2026 Taranto	200 m backstroke

Sudem Denizli (born 15 August 2005) is a Turkish swimmer who specializes in backstroke swimming.

== Sport career ==
Denizli started her swimming career at age five impressed by her cousins. For competitive swimming, she entered first Eskişehir Aquatics Club in her hometown, and set a number of national records. In 2018, she was admitted to the national youth swimming team. Later, she joined Enka SK. She then transferred to Galatasaray Swimming, where she is trained by Aybars Şawiş.

=== 2019 ===
She took the bronze medal in the 200 m event at the 2019 European Youth Summer Olympic Festival in Baku, Azerbaijan.

=== 2020 ===
She competed in the backstroke events of 100 m, 200 m and 200 m individual medley events at the 2020 European Aquatics Championships in Budapest, Hungary without success.

=== 2021 ===
She set a new Turkish record in the 200 m backstroke event of the age group 15–18 with 2:13:16. She competed in the 100 m backstroke event at the 2020 European Aquatics Championships in Budapest, Hungary. She was unable to win a medal, but set a new national record of the age category 15-18 with 1:02.07.

=== 2022 ===
She competed in the 200 m backstroke finals and ranked sixt at the 2022 Mediterranean Games in Oran, Algeria.

At the 2022 European Junior Swimming Championships, she finished the 200 m backstroke finals at seventh place.

She won the silver medal in the 200 m baclstrpke event at the postponed 2021 Islamic Solidarity Games in Konya, Turkey.

=== 2025 ===
She competed at the 2025 Summer World University Games in Germany withourt success .

She captured six gold medals at the 2025 Islamic Solidarity Games in Riyadh, Saudi Arabia, including in the backstroke events of 50 m, 100 m, and 200 m, 4 x 200 m individual medley, 4 x 100 m freestyle, and 4 x 100 m medley events.

== Personal life ==
Sudem Denizli was born in Eskişehir, Turkey on 15 August 2005.
