= Swimming at the 2025 Islamic Solidarity Games =

Swimming competition

- Venue: Saudi Arabian Olympic Committee Complex Green Hall 2
- Dates: 8—12 November 2025
- Competitors: 228 from 39 nations

The swimming tournament at the 2025 Islamic Solidarity Games in Riyadh was held between 8—12 November 2025. The swimming competition took place at Saudi Arabian Olympic Committee Complex Green Hall 2 in Saudi Arabia.

== Medal table ==
* Host nation (Saudi Arabia)

Rank	Nation	Gold	Silver	Bronze	Total
1	Turkey	27	13	8	48
2	Kazakhstan	3	5	3	11
3	Uzbekistan	2	2	2	6
4	Uganda	2	1	1	4
5	Indonesia	1	5	6	12
6	Algeria	1	4	4	9
7	Tunisia	1	2	0	3
8	Iran	1	1	3	5
9	Saudi Arabia*	1	0	2	3
10	Morocco	1	0	1	2
11	Egypt	0	4	1	5
12	Azerbaijan	0	1	2	3
12	Senegal	0	1	2	3
14	Qatar	0	1	0	1
15	Lebanon	0	0	3	3
16	Palestine	0	0	1	1
16	Syria	0	0	1	1
Totals (17 entries)		40	40	40	120

== Medal summary ==
=== Men ===
Event	Gold		Silver		Bronze	
50 m freestyle	Samyar Abdoli; Iran	22.44	Abdelrahman Sameh; Egypt	22.51	Zaid Al-Sarraj; Saudi Arabia	22.57
100 m freestyle	Zaid Al-Sarraj; Saudi Arabia	49.62	Ali Tamer Hassan; Qatar	49.63	Emad Zaben; Saudi Arabia	50.4
200 m freestyle	Ahmet Mete Boylu; Turkey	1:48.65 GR	Ilya Sibirtsev; Uzbekistan	1:50.04	Mohammad Ghasemi; Iran	1:50.63
400 m freestyle	Ilya Sibirtsev; Uzbekistan	3:50.01 GR	Kuzey Tunçelli; Turkey	3:54.40	Ahmet Mete Boylu; Turkey	3:54.94
1500 m freestyle	Kuzey Tunçelli; Turkey	15:04.84 GR	Ilya Sibirtsev; Uzbekistan	15:15.15	Suleyman Ismayilzada; Azerbaijan	15:28.42
50 m backstroke	Mert Ali Satır; Turkey	25.72	Homer Abbasi; Iran	25.78	Jason Donovan Yusuf; Indonesia	25.87
100 m backstroke	Mert Ali Satır; Turkey	55.96	Abdelrahman Atia; Egypt	56.38	Berk Özkul; Turkey	56.71
200 m backstroke	Berke Saka; Turkey	2:00.08 GR	Mohamed Ben Abbes; Tunisia	2:01.30	Mert Hatipoğlu; Turkey	2:03.05
50 m breaststroke	Emre Sakçı; Turkey	27.37	Nusrat Allahverdi; Turkey	27.71	Ahmed Fliyou; Morocco	28.02
100 m breaststroke	Emre Sakçı; Turkey	1:01.26	Nusrat Allahverdi; Turkey	1:01.75	Aibat Myrzamuratov; Kazakhstan	1:02.11
200 m breaststroke	Doruk Yoğurtçuoğlu; Turkey	2:13.63	Jaouad Syoud; Algeria	2:16.66	Aibat Myrzamuratov; Kazakhstan	2:17.90
50 m butterfly	Adilbek Mussin; Kazakhstan	23.85	Maxim Skazobtsov; Kazakhstan	23.87	Abdelrahman Sameh; Egypt	23.90
100 m butterfly	Eldorbek Usmonov; Uzbekistan	52.69 GR	Adilbek Mussin; Kazakhstan	52.73	Jesse Ssengonzi; Uganda	53.45
200 m butterfly	Polat Uzer Turnalı; Turkey	1:58.14	Ramil Valizada; Azerbaijan	2:01.16	Mohammad Mahdi Gholami; Iran	2:01.35
200 m individual medley	Berke Saka; Turkey	1:59.51 GR	Jaouad Syoud; Algeria	2:03.01	Aibat Myrzamuratov; Kazakhstan	2:05.07
400 m individual medley	Jaouad Syoud; Algeria	4:23.36	Polat Uzer Turnalı; Turkey	4:23.60	Onur Ege Öksüz; Turkey	4:24.42
4×100 m freestyle	Turkey; Demir Özdemir (51.14); Emre Sakçı (50.31); Arda Akkoyun (51.34); Ahmet Mete Boylu (49.82)	3:22.61	Kazakhstan; Adilbek Mussin (50.66); Galymzhan Balabek (51.41); Gleb Kovalenya (51.02); Aibat Myrzamuratov (49.95)	3:23.04	Uzbekistan; Muhammadsodik Makhsudov (51.65); Mikhail Kleshko (51.72); Ilya Sibirtsev (50.42); Eldorbek Usmonov (50.03)	3:23.82
4×200 m freestyle	Turkey; Ahmet Mete Boylu (1:51.13); Kuzey Tunçelli (1:52.71); Demir Özdemir (1:54.72); Berke Saka (1:52.17)	7:30.73	Kazakhstan; Adilbek Mussin (1:53.67); Daniil Cherepanov (1:54.82); Maxim Skazobtsov (1:52.29); Galymzhan Balabek (1:52.72)	7:33.50	Iran; Mohammad Ghasemi (1:51.67); Mohammad Mahdi Gholami (1:55.30); Ali Rashidpour (1:53.20); Matin Sohran (1:54.02)	7:34.19
4×100 m medley	Turkey; Mert Ali Satır (56.18); Emre Sakçı (1:01.13); Arda Akkoyun (52.95); Demir Özdemir (50.30)	3:40.56	Kazakhstan; Gleb Kovalenya (58.01); Aibat Myrzamuratov (1:02.25); Maxim Skazobtsov (53.20); Adilbek Mussin (49.68)	3:43.14	Indonesia; Farrel Armandio Tangkas (56.60); Muhammad Dwiky Raharjo (1:02.87); Joe Kurniawan (53.78); Jason Donovan Yusuf (50.82)	3:44.07

=== Women ===
Event	Gold		Silver		Bronze	
50 m freestyle	Gloria Muzito; Uganda	25.59 GR	Farida Osman; Egypt	26.04	Nadia Aisha Nurazmi; Indonesia	26.18
100 m freestyle	Gloria Muzito; Uganda	55.26 GR	Gizem Güvenç; Turkey	55.47	Oumy Diop; Senegal	57.48
200 m freestyle	Ecem Dönmez Öğretir; Turkey	2:03.89	Gloria Muzito; Uganda	2:04.99	Defne Tanığ; Turkey	2:07.43
400 m freestyle	Jamila Boulakbech; Tunisia	4:19.59	Ecem Dönmez Öğretir; Turkey	4:20.85	Belis Şakar; Turkey	4:24.95
800 m freestyle	Selinnur Sade; Turkey	8:44.64	Jamila Boulakbech; Tunisia	8:57.01	Belis Şakar; Turkey	9:05.53
50 m backstroke	Sudem Denizli; Turkey	29.07	Oumy Diop; Senegal	29.66	Flairene Candrea; Indonesia	29.74
100 m backstroke	Sudem Denizli; Turkey	1:02.31	Halime Zulal Zeren; Turkey	1:03.62	Flairene Candrea; Indonesia	1:04.20
200 m backstroke	Sudem Denizli; Turkey	2:15.27	Halime Zulal Zeren; Turkey	2:17.67	Jihane Benchadli; Algeria	2:21.62
50 m breaststroke	Imane El Barodi; Morocco	32.23	Pınar Dönmez; Turkey	32.24	Lynn El Hajj; Lebanon	32.68
100 m breaststroke	Pınar Dönmez; Turkey	1:10.25	Adellia; Indonesia	1:10.73	Lynn El Hajj; Lebanon	1:10.90
200 m breaststroke	Adellia; Indonesia	2:32.24	Pınar Dönmez; Turkey	2:32.91	Lynn El Hajj; Lebanon	2:33.93
50 m butterfly	Sofia Spodarenko; Kazakhstan	26.99 GR	Farida Osman; Egypt	27.04	Oumy Diop; Senegal	27.31
100 m butterfly	Sofia Spodarenko; Kazakhstan	1:01.66	Defne Tanığ; Turkey	1:02.05	Seher Kaya; Turkey	1:02.42
200 m butterfly	Defne Tanığ; Turkey	2:15.21	Seher Kaya; Turkey	2:15.57	Imène Kawthar Zitouni; Algeria	2:22.90
200 m individual medley	Sudem Denizli; Turkey	2:18.13	Azzahra Permatahani; Indonesia	2:23.43	Valerie Tarazi; Palestine	2:24.31
400 m individual medley	Ecem Dönmez Öğretir; Turkey	4:53.63	Belis Şakar; Turkey	4:57.29	Inana Soleman; Syria	5:06.11
4×100 m freestyle	Turkey; Nehir Toker (1:00.08); Sudem Denizli (57.82); Seher Kaya (59.92); Gizem Güvenç (56.87)	3:54.69	Algeria; Ryma Benmansour (59.37); Abdellaoui Samara (1:00.65); Lilia Sihem Midouni (58.04); Nesrine Medjahed (58.03)	3:56.09	Indonesia; Nadia Aisha Nurazmi (58.52); Azzahra Permatahani (59.62); Flairene Candrea (1:01.99); Adellia (1:02.13)	4:02.26
4×200 m freestyle	Turkey; Defne Tanığ (2:05.77); Belis Şakar (2:07.68); Ecem Dönmez Öğretir (2:08.02); Gizem Güvenç (2:13.84)	8:35.31	Algeria; Abdellaoui Samara (2:10.33); Lilia Sihem Midouni (2:11.44); Ryma Benmansour (2:13.91); Nesrine Medjahed (2:14.23)	8:49.91	Azerbaijan; Maryam Javadova (2:12.56); Vlastilina Khasyanova (2:15.15); Mehri Abdurahmanli (2:19.11); Fatima Alkaramova (2:11.26)	8:58.08 NR
4×100 m medley	Turkey; Sudem Denizli (1:02.66); Pınar Dönmez (1:10.74); Defne Tanığ (1:02.94); Gizem Güvenç (59.25)	4:15.59	Indonesia; Flairene Candrea (1:05.02); Adellia (1:11.81); Azzahra Permatahani (1:03.64); Nadia Aisha Nurazmi (58.15)	4:19.89	Algeria; Meroua Merniz (1:04.70); Dounia Monia Chaar (1:16.36); Lilia Sihem Midouni (2:19.11); Nesrine Medjahed (1:00.06)	4:24.76

=== Mixed ===
Event	Gold		Silver		Bronze	
4x100 m freestyle	Turkey; Ahmet Mete Boylu (51.63); Demir Özdemir (51.22); Nehir Toker (59.56); Gizem Güvenç (55.74)	3:38.15 GR	Indonesia; Jason Donovan Yusuf (52.00); Joe Kurniawan (50.86); Nadia Aisha Nurazmi (58.01); Azzahra Permatahani (59.09)	3:39.96	Algeria; Redouane Bouali (52.09); Mehdi Nazim Benbara (51.09); Ryma Benmansour (59.96); Nesrine Medjahed (58.35)	3:41.49
4x100 m medley relay	Turkey; Mert Ali Satır (56.41); Emre Sakçı (1:01.17); Defne Tanığ (1:04.45); Gizem Güvenç (55.93)	3:57.96 GR	Indonesia; Farrel Armandio Tangkas (57.44); Muhammad Dwiky Raharjo (1:03.47); Nadia Aisha Nurazmi (1:03.03); Azzahra Permatahani (59.59)	4:03.53	Uzbekistan; Parizod Abdukarimova (1:08.38); Muhammadismail Rahmonov (1:04.50); Eldorbek Usmonov (52.09); Osiyokhon Redjapova (59.73)	4:04.70

== Participating nations ==
A total of 255 athletes from 39 nations competed in swimming at the 2025 Islamic Solidarity Games:

1. Afghanistan (4)
2. Algeria (24)
3. Azerbaijan (13)
4. Bangladesh (2)
5. Benin (2)
6. Djibouti (2)
7. The Gambia (2)
8. Guinea (1)
9. Guinea-Bissau (1)
10. Guyana (1)
11. Egypt (6)
12. Indonesia (34)
13. Iran (9)
14. Kazakhstan (7)
15. Kuwait (5)
16. Kyrgyzstan (7)
17. Lebanon (2)
18. Libya (1)
19. Maldives (9)
20. Mauritania (1)
21. Morocco (4)
22. Mozambique (2)
23. Niger (2)
24. Nigeria (8)
25. Oman (4)
26. Pakistan (8)
27. Palestine (4)
28. Qatar (6)
29. Saudi Arabia (14)
30. Senegal (6)
31. Sierra Leone (7)
32. Suriname (1)
33. Syria (2)
34. Tajikistan (2)
35. Turkmenistan (1)
36. Tunisia (5)
37. Turkey (26)
38. United Arab Emirates (6)
39. Uganda (19)
40. Uzbekistan (16)
