= Pınar Dönmez =

Turkish swimmer (born 2007)

Personal information
- National team: Turkey
- Born: 24 March 2007 (age 19) İzmir, Turkey

Sport
- Sport: Swimming
- Strokes: Breaststroke
- Club: Olimpik Göztepe
Medal record
Women's swimming
Representing Turkey
Islamic Solidarity Games
Gold medal – first place	2025 Riyadh	100 m breaststroke
Gold medal – first place	2025 Riyadh	4x100 m medley
Silver medal – second place	2025 Riyadh	50 m breaststroke
Silver medal – second place	2025 Riyadh	200 m breaststroke

Pınar Dönmez (born 24 March 2007) is a Turkish swimmer who specializes in breaststroke swimming.

== Sport career ==
Dönmez is a member of Olimpik Club in her hometown.

At the 2022 Grand Prix Golden Bear tournament held in Zagreb, Croatia, she competed in the breaststroke swimming events of 50 m (0:32.64), 100 m ( 1:11.42), 200 m (2:36.59) and won one gold and two silver medals in the open age category, as well as three gold medals in the junior category respectively.

She competed at the 2025 Islamic Solidarity Games in Riyadh, Saudi Arabia, and captured two gold medals in the 100 m breaststroke and 4 x 100 medley relay events, as well as two silver medals in the breaststroke events of 50 m, and 200 m.

== Personal life ==
Pınar Dönmez was born in İzmir, Turkey on 24 March 2007.
