= Belis Şakar =

Turkish swimmer (born 2007)

Personal information
- National team: Turkey
- Born: 5 September 2007 (age 19) Istanbul, Turkey

Sport
- Sport: Swimming
- Strokes: Freestyle
- Club: Enka SK
Medal record
Women's swimming
Representing Turkey
European Youth Olympic Festival
| Silver medal – second place | 2022 Banská Bystrica | 200 m butterfly |
| Silver medal – second place | 2022 Banská Bystrica | 200 m medley |
Islamic Solidarity Games
| Gold medal – first place | 2025 Riyadh | 4×200 m freestyle |
| Silver medal – second place | 2025 Riyadh | 400 m medley |
| Bronze medal – third place | 2025 Riyadh | 400 m freestyle |
| Bronze medal – third place | 2025 Riyadh | 800 m freestyle |

Belis Şakar (born 5 September 2007) is a Turkish swimmer who specializes in freestyle and butterfly stroke events as well as takes part in medley events.

== Sport career ==
Şakar is a member of Enka SK.

=== 2021 ===
On 28 December 2021, she set a national record in the 400 m medley event of the 14 years-old girls category with 4:44.55 at the short course championships. The nextweek, she set another national record in the 200 m medley event of the 14 years-old girls category with 2:19.44 at the long course national selections.

At the 2021 Comen Cup (Mediterranean Cup) in Belgrade, Serbia, she collected four medals, including a beonze medal in the 100 m butterfly (1:03.41), a silver medal in the 400 m individual medley (5:00.70 ), two gold medals in the 200 m butterfly (2:17.69) and 200 m individual medley (2:20.99).

=== 2022 ===
She won two silver medals in the 200 m butterfly with 2:15.71 and in the 20 m individual medley with 2:19.12 at the 2022 European Youth Summer Olympic Festival in Banská Bystrica, Poland.

She won the silver medal in 40 m individual medley with 4:47.11 at the 2022 European Junior Swimming Championships in Otopeni, Romania.

At the 2022 FINA World Junior Swimming Championships in Lima, Peru, she took the bronze medal in the 4 × 200 m freestyle relay event with 8:20.75.

=== 2023 ===
She won the silver medal in the 400 m individual medley event with 4:52.36 at the Acropolis Swim Open 2023 in Athens, Greece.

=== 2024 ===
She set a new national record in the 400 m freestyle of the women's 17+ age category with 4:19:40 at the 2024 International Princes' Islands Swimming Championships in Istanbul, Turkey.

=== 2025 ===
Şakar competed at the 2025 Islamic Solidarity Games in Riyadh, Saudi Arabia, and won four medals in total, including two bronze medals in the freestyle events of 400 m and 800 m, a silver medal in the 400 m individual medley, and a gold medal in the 4 × 200 m freestyle.

== Personal life ==
Belis Şakar was born on 5 September 2007.
