= Selinnur Sade =

Turkish swimmer (born 2008)

Personal information
- National team: Turkey
- Born: 4 May 2008 (age 18) Antalya, Turkey

Sport
- Sport: Swimming
- Strokes: Freestyle
- Club: Beylikdüzü Swim Club
Medal record
Women's swimming
Representing Turkey
Islamic Solidarity Games
Gold medal – first place	2025 Riyadh	800 m freestyle

Selinnur Sade (born 4 May 2008) is a Turkish swimmer who specializes in freestyle swimming.

== Sport career ==
Sade was admitted to the national team after she became champion in the 400 m freestyle event with 4:27 at the Turkey Youth, Junior and Open Age Long Course Swimming National Team Selection held in Edirne in 2023.

She won the gold medal in the 400 m individual medley event with 4:23:92 and the silver medal in the 800 m freestyle event with 9:02.10 of the Girls age group 14–15 at the 2023 Mediterranean Cup in Larissa, Greece. In the 400 m freestyle event, she ranked sixth. She then competed at the 2023 European Youth Summer Olympic Festival in Maribor, Slovenia without success.

She captured the gold medal in the 800 m freestyle event with 8:44.64’ at the 2025 Islamic Solidarity Games in Riyadh, Saudi Arabia.

== Personal life ==
A native of Antalya, Turkey, Selinnur Sade was born on 4 May 2008.

She is a student at Beylikdüzü Cahit Zarifoğlu Anatolian High School in Istanbul.
