= Swimming at the 2024 European Aquatics Championships – Men's 50 metre breaststroke =

Men's 50 metre breaststroke at the 2024 European Aquatics Championships
- Venue: Sports Centre Milan Gale Muškatirović
- Dates: 21 June (heats and semifinals); 22 June (final)
- Winning time: 26.92

Medalists
gold medal	Hüseyin Emre Sakçı	Turkey
silver medal	Noel de Geus	Germany
bronze medal	Kristian Pitshugin	Israel

The Men's 50 metre breaststroke competition of the 2024 European Aquatics Championships was held on 21 and 22 June 2024.

== Records ==
Prior to the competition, the existing world, European and championship records were as follows.

	Name	Nationality	Time	Location	Date
World record	Adam Peaty	Great Britain	25.95	Budapest	25 July 2017
European record	Adam Peaty	Great Britain	25.95	Budapest	25 July 2017
Championship record	Adam Peaty	Great Britain	26.09	Glasgow	8 August 2018

== Results ==
=== Heats ===
The heats were started on 21 June at 09:40.
Qualification Rules: The 16 fastest from the heats qualify to the semifinals.

Rank	Heat	Lane	Name	Nationality	Time	Notes
1	4	4	Noel de Geus	Germany	27.07	Q
2	3	9	Hüseyin Emre Sakçı	Turkey	27.19	Q
3	3	5	Kristian Pitshugin	Israel	27.26	Q
4	5	3	Heiko Gigler	Austria	27.27	Q
5	5	4	Peter John Stevens	Slovenia	27.30	Q
6	4	6	Jørgen Bråthen	Norway	27.32	Q
7	3	4	Bernhard Reitshammer	Austria	27.41	Q
8	5	5	Volodymyr Lisovets	Ukraine	27.43	Q
9	5	2	Nusrat Allahverdi	Turkey	27.61	Q
10	3	2	Vojtech Janecek	Czech Republic	27.69	Q
10	5	6	Jan Kalusowski	Poland	27.69	Q
12	3	3	Valentin Bayer	Austria	27.72	
13	4	7	Elias Elsgaard	Denmark	27.74	Q
14	4	5	Georgios Aspougalis	Greece	27.93	Q
15	3	8	Jonathan Itzhaki	Israel	27.94	Q
16	5	7	Olli Kokko	Finland	27.97	Q
17	4	8	Lyubomir Epitropov	Bulgaria	27.99	Q
18	4	3	Tonislav Sabev	Bulgaria	28.02	
19	3	1	Snorri Dagur Einarsson	Iceland	28.10	
20	5	8	Julius Nyberg	Finland	28.12	
21	3	7	Maksym Ovchinnikov	Ukraine	28.17	
22	2	6	Denis Svet	Latvia	28.18	
22	5	1	Davin Lindholm	Finland	28.18	
24	4	9	Einar Margeir Ágústsson	Iceland	28.19	
25	4	2	Jonas Gaur	Denmark	28.33	
26	5	9	Vojtech Netrh	Czech Republic	28.36	
27	3	0	Jovan Bojčić	Serbia	28.66	
28	2	3	João Reisen	Luxembourg	28.71	
29	2	7	Daniils Bobrovs	Latvia	28.76	
30	4	0	Jami Ihalainen	Finland	28.84	
31	2	1	Linus Kahl	Sweden	28.93	
31	2	2	Luka Eradze	Georgia	28.93	
33	2	4	Finn Wendland	Germany	29.01	
34	2	8	Robert Falborg Pedersen	Denmark	29.02	
35	2	5	Constantin Malachi	Moldova	29.03	
36	1	5	Bartal Erlingsson Eidesgaard	Faroe Islands	29.27	NR
37	1	4	Vadym Naumenko	Ukraine	29.67	
38	1	3	Bartal Erlingsson Eidesgaard	Faroe Islands	32.43	
	3	6	Andrius Šidlauskas	Lithuania	Disqualified	
	4	1	Uroš Živanović	Serbia	Disqualified	

=== Semifinals ===
The semifinal were started on 19 June at 19:34.
Qualification Rules: The first 2 competitors of each semifinal and the remaining fastest (up to a total of 8 qualified competitors) from the semifinals advance to the final.

Rank	Heat	Lane	Name	Nationality	Time	Notes
1	1	4	Hüseyin Emre Sakçı	Turkey	26.93	Q
2	2	6	Bernhard Reitshammer	Austria	27.04	Q
3	2	4	Noel de Geus	Germany	27.06	Q
4	2	5	Kristian Pitshugin	Israel	27.09	Q
5	1	6	Volodymyr Lisovets	Ukraine	27.25	Q
6	1	5	Heiko Gigler	Austria	27.33	Q
7	2	3	Peter John Stevens	Slovenia	27.35	Q
8	2	2	Nusrat Allahverdi	Turkey	27.42	Q
9	2	7	Jan Kalusowski	Poland	27.43	
10	1	3	Jørgen Bråthen	Norway	27.56	
11	1	7	Elias Elsgaard	Denmark	27.61	
12	1	1	Jonathan Itzhaki	Israel	28.03	
13	2	1	Georgios Aspougalis	Greece	28.07	
14	2	8	Olli Kokko	Finland	28.38	
	1	2	Vojtech Janecek	Czech Republic	Disqualified	
	1	8	Lyubomir Epitropov	Bulgaria	Disqualified	

=== Final ===
The final was held on 22 June at 18:42.

Rank	Lane	Name	Nationality	Time	Notes
1st place, gold medalist(s)	4	Hüseyin Emre Sakçı	Turkey	26.92	
2nd place, silver medalist(s)	3	Noel de Geus	Germany	26.93	
3rd place, bronze medalist(s)	6	Kristian Pitshugin	Israel	27.02	NR
4	5	Bernhard Reitshammer	Austria	27.07	
5	7	Heiko Gigler	Austria	27.25	
6	8	Nusrat Allahverdi	Turkey	27.35	
7	1	Peter John Stevens	Slovenia	27.39	
8	2	Volodymyr Lisovets	Ukraine	Disqualified	
