= Berke Saka =

Turkish swimmer (born 2003)

Personal information
- Born: 9 July 2003 (age 23) Istanbul, Turkey
- Height: 1.90 m (6 ft 3 in)

Sport
- Sport: Swimming
- Strokes: Backstroke
- Club: Galatasaray
- College team: Georgia Tech
Medal record
Men's Swimming
Representing Turkey
Senior level
European Championships (LC)
Bronze medal – third place	2024 Belgrade	200 m medley
European Championships (SC)
Bronze medal – third place	2025 Lublin	200 m individual medley
Islamic Solidarity Games
Gold medal – first place	2021 Konya	100 m backstroke
Gold medal – first place	2021 Konya	200 m backstroke
Gold medal – first place	2025 Riyadh	200 m backstroke
Gold medal – first place	2025 Riyadh	200 m individual medley
Gold medal – first place	2025 Riyadh	4×200 m freestyle
Silver medal – second place	2021 Konya	4×100 m medley
Bronze medal – third place	2021 Konya	200 m individual medley
Mediterranean Games
Silver medal – second place	2026 Taranto	200 m medley
Bronze medal – third place	2022 Oran	4×100 m medley
Youth level
European Junior Championships
Gold medal – first place	2021 Rome	200 m medley
Silver medal – second place	2021 Rome	200 m backstroke
European Youth Summer Olympic Festival
Silver medal – second place	2019 Baku	200 m backstroke
Bronze medal – third place	2019 Baku	200 m medley

Berke Saka (born 9 July 2003) is a Turkish male swimmer competing in the backstroke event.

== Career ==
Saka is a member of Galatasaray Swimming. He broke the 13-years old national record of Derya Büyükuncu in the 200 m backstroke event with 1:58.08. He set a national record in the 200 metres individual medley event for 17-18 age class with 2:01.58 at the 2020 European Aquatics Championships in Budapest, Hungary. He won the silver medal in the 200 m backstroke event with 2:01.62 and the bronze medal in the 200 m individual medley event with 2:03.25 at the 2019 European Youth Summer Olympic Festival in Baku, Azerbaycan. He won the gold medal in the 200 m individual medley, the silver medal in the 200 m backstroke event of the 2021 European Junior Swimming Championships in Rome, Italy.

He obtained a quota for participation at the 2020 Summer Olympics. Saka was the flag bearer for Turkey together with Merve Tuncel at the 2020 Summer Olympics opening ceremony.

Olympic Games
Preceded by Rıza Kayaalp	Flagbearer for Turkey; Tokyo 2020 with Merve Tuncel	Succeeded by Incumbent
