= Defne Tanığ =

Turkish swimmer (born 2007)

Personal information
- National team: Turkey
- Born: 21 June 2007 (age 19) Istanbul, Turkey

Sport
- Sport: Swimming
- Strokes: Butterfly stroke
Medal record
Women's swimming
Representing Turkey
Islamic Solidarity Games
Bronze medal – third place	2025 Riyadh	200 m freestyle
Silver medal – second place	2025 Riyadh	100 m butterfly stroke
Gold medal – first place	2025 Riyadh	200 m butterfly stroke
Gold medal – first place	2025 Riyadh	4 x 100 medley
Gold medal – first place	2025 Riyadh	4 x 100 mixed medley relay GR

Defne Tanığ (born 21 June 2007) is a Turkish swimmer who specializes in butterfly stroke swimming.

== Sport career ==
Tanığ is a member of Enka SK. On 28 December 2021, she set a new national record in the 100 m medley event of the 14 years-old girls category with 1:03.62 at the short course swimming championships.

In July 2022, she became champion in the 200 m butterfly stroke event of the open age category at the Open Luxembourg Nationals. She was so entitled to participate at the 2022 FINA World Junior Swimming Championships in Lima, Peru. She took the bronze medal in the 4 × 200 m freestyle relay event in Lima, Peru.

She won the gold medal in the 200 m butterfly stroke event with 2:11.50 at the 2024 National Open Swimming Championships held in Thessaloniki, Greece.

She competed at the 2025 Solidarity Games in Riyadh, Saudi Arabia, and captured five medals in total, a bronze medal in 200 m freestyle, a silver medal in 100 m butterfly stroke, and three gold medals in 200 m butterfly stroke, 4 x 100 medley and 4 x 100 mixed medley relay, also setting a Games record in latter event with 3:57.96.

== Personal life ==
A native of Istanbul, Turkey, Defne Tanığ was born on 21 June 2007.
