= Seher Kaya =

Turkish swimmer (born 2010)

Personal information
- National team: Turkey
- Born: 5 January 2010 (age 16) Uşak, Turkey

Sport
- Sport: Swimming
- Strokes: Butterfly
- Club: Galatasaray Swimming
Medal record
Women's swimming
Representing Turkey
Islamic Solidarity Games
Bronze medal – third place	2025 Riyadh	100 m butterfly
Silver medal – second place	2025 Riyadh	200 m butterfly
Gold medal – first place	2025 Riyadh	4 × 100 m freestyle

Seher Kaya (born 5 January 2010) is a Turkish swimmer who specializes in butterfly stroke events.

== Sport career ==
Kaya started her competitive swimming career at Kor (Core) Sports Club in her hometown. Later, she transferred to Galatasaray Swimming.

In May 2024, she became champion at the Turkish Youth Swimming National team Selection Tournament in Edirne, and was admitted first time to the national swimming team. She is coached by Aybars Sawiş.

She took the bronze medal in the 200 m butterfly event of the 13–15 years-old girls category with 2:20.18 at the 2025 Comen Cup Mediterranean Swimming in Belgrade, Serbia. Her time of 1:03.50 in the 100 m butterfly event placed her at fourth rank.

At the 2025 European Youth Summer Olympic Festival in Skopje, North Macedonia, she took the bronze medal in the 100 m butterfly event.

Kaya competed at the 2025 Islamic Solidarity Games in Riyadh, Saudi Arabia, and won three medals, including a bronze in the 100 m butterfly, a silver in the 200 m butterfly, and a gold in the 4 × 100 m freestyle.

== Personal life ==
Born on 5 January 2010, Seher Kaya is a native of Uşak, Turkey,

After completing the Uşak Şefkat Junior School, she moved to Eskişehir, where she attends Kılıçoğlu Anatolian High School.
