= Konya Olympic Swimming Pool =

Indoor Olympic swimming pool in Turkey

Coordinates: 37.94364°N 32.48565°E

Konya Olympic Swimming Pool (Turkish: Konya Olimpik Yüzme Havuzu) is an indoor Olympic-size swimming pool facility located in Konya, Turkey.

The Konya Ilympic Swimming Pool is located at Parsana neighborhood of Selçuklu district in Konya, Turkey. Built primarily to host the swimming events at the 2021 Islamic Solidarity Games, the swimming pool was opened on 21 July 2022. The building covers an area of 8,080 m^{2} (87,000 sq ft). There are one Olympic-size (50 m), two short course (25 m) pools. Additionally, for training and diving events, the complex features a 20 m wide and 5 m deep pool with a diving tower of seven platforms. The sports venıe has a seating capacity of 1,000.
