= Galatasaray Swimming =

Swimming club in Istanbul, Turkey

Galatasaray
- Founded: 1973
- League: Turkish Swimming Championship
- Based in: İstanbul, Turkey
- Arena: Galatasaray Olympic Aquatic Center
- Colors: Yellow & Red
- President: Dursun Özbek
- Head coach: Ali Özüak
- Championships: 32 (Turkish League)
- Mascot: Lion
- Website: http://www.galatasaray.org/susporlari/yuzme/

Galatasaray Swimming Team is the men's and women's swimming section of Galatasaray S.K., a major sports club in Istanbul, Turkey.

== Technical and managerial staff ==
Name	Nat.	Job
Yılmaz Özüak	(Turkey)	Swimming Coordinator
Ali Özüak	(Turkey)	Branch Captain
Dejan Pejinovic	(Serbia)	Technical Director
Hakan Kiper	(Turkey)	Coach
Memduha Denizer	(Turkey)	Coach
Ergun Erzurum	(Turkey)	Coach
Hakan Çark	(Turkey)	Coach
Fatih Kurt	(Turkey)	Coach
İsmet Karakuz	(Turkey)	Masseur
Kadir Arpacı	(Turkey)	Fitness Coach

== Current squad ==
Men's	Women's
(Turkey) Alp Yokay	(Turkey) Ela Naz Özdemir
(Turkey) Aytekin Mindan	(Turkey) Dilara Çakırtürk
(Turkey) Can Anacak	(Turkey) Sudem Denizli
(Turkey) Boğaç Ayhan
(Turkey) Nazlı Uzman
(Turkey) Derya Büyükuncu	(Turkey) Gizem Aybar
(Turkey) Doğa Çelik	(Turkey) Burcu Yeşil
(Turkey) Göksu Biçer	(Turkey) Harika Güzel
(Turkey) Emirali Başer	(Turkey) Hilal Akyüz
(Turkey) Kemal Arda Gürdal	(Turkey) İlayda Başar
(Turkey) Ömer Aslanoğlu	(Turkey) İpek Acar
(Turkey) Uğur Ödek	(Turkey) İpek Yalkı
(Turkey) Uğurcan Gegin	(Turkey) Melis Yokay
(Turkey) Yalım Demirkesen	(Turkey) Seher Kaya
(Turkey) Zorbey Ege Cantürk

== Galatasaray swimming team ==
=== International success ===
- International Prince Islands Cup:
  - Winners (3): 1997, 1999, 2001
- Luxembourg Swimming Championship:
  - Winners(4): 1998, 1999, 2000, 2002
- Internationales Stuttgarter Schwimfest:
  - Winners(1): 2004
- Sun Cup:
  - Winners (1): 1989
- International Chios Swimming Cup:
  - Winners (1): 1989

=== Galatasaray Men's Swimming Team ===
Turkish Summer Swimming Championship - Senior's

- Winner (18): 1980, 1983, 1988, 1991, 1992, 1993, 1994, 1995, 1996, 1997, 1999, 2001, 2002, 2006, 2010, 2011, 2012, 2013

Turkish Winter Swimming Championship - Senior's

- Winner (10): 1991, 1992, 1993, 1994, 1995, 1996, 1997, 2002, 2003, 2010

=== Galatasaray Women's Swimming Team ===
Turkish Summer Swimming Championship - Senior's

- Winner (18): 1980, 1981, 1982, 1983, 1985, 1986, 1987, 1988, 1989, 1991, 1992, 1993, 1994, 1995, 1996, 1997, 2001, 2002

Turkish Winter Swimming Championship - Senior's

- Winner (10): 1991, 1992, 1993, 1994, 1995, 1997, 2001, 2002, 2003, 2010
