= Toker Dam =

Fourth largest dam in Eritrea

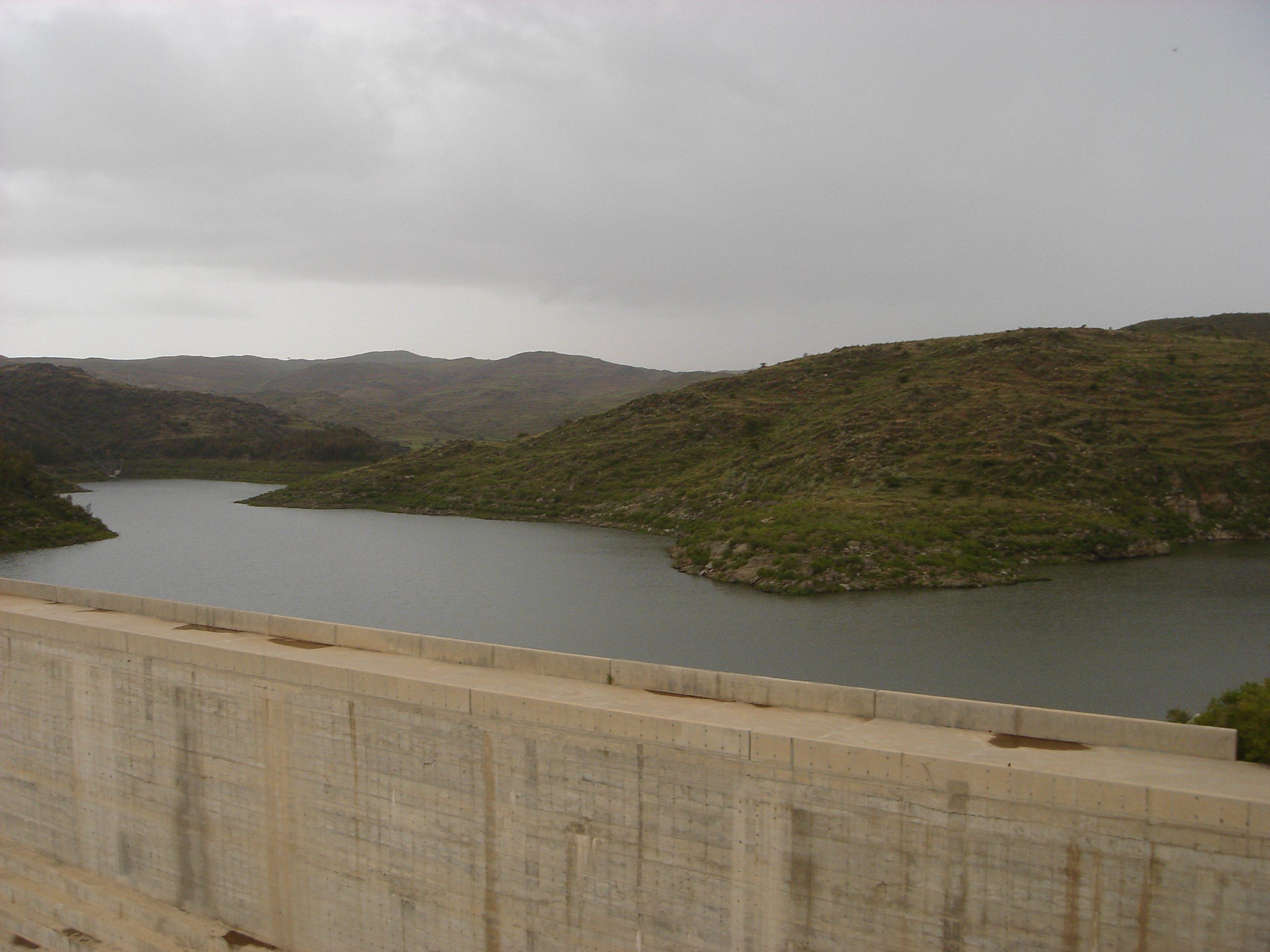
A view of Toker Dam and its reservoir outside of Asmara, Eritrea

Toker Dam is the fourth largest dam in Eritrea. Construction was begun in 1997 and completed in 2001, despite having to be halted for a few months in 1998 when Ethiopia and Eritrea were at war. Its primary designer was Natural Resources Consulting Engineers from Colorado, USA. Furthermore, NRCE Inc., was the primary consultant on the project. The construction contractor was Keagnam of South Korea.

The project was designed to provide modern and effective service to the City of Asmara and neighboring villages. It further provides safe drinking water for the local population. The dam is a roller compacted concrete dam, and was one of the highest in sub-Saharan Africa at the time it was built.

== The dam ==
The dam is 73 metres tall and is composed of 210,000 cubic metres (7,400,000 cu ft) of concrete. The upstream face is vertical and the downstream face is sloping, with a central spillway. The reservoir can hold 17,000,000 cubic metres (600,000,000 cu ft) of water; there is a pumping station at its toe, leading to a water filtration plant. This has a capacity of 20,000 cubic metres (710,000 cu ft) water per day which is delivered to the city of Asmara's distribution system.

During construction, the cofferdam was overtopped for about four days during a large flood, when the dam was about one third of its final height. The flood was in excess of the once in a hundred years flood expectation. The contractors had little warning but managed to get most of their equipment away from the critical area before the event struck. The conventional and roller-compacted concrete in the main dam were largely undamaged and construction work was resumed within a fortnight.
