= Adelaida Pchelintseva =

Kazakhstani swimmer (born 1999)

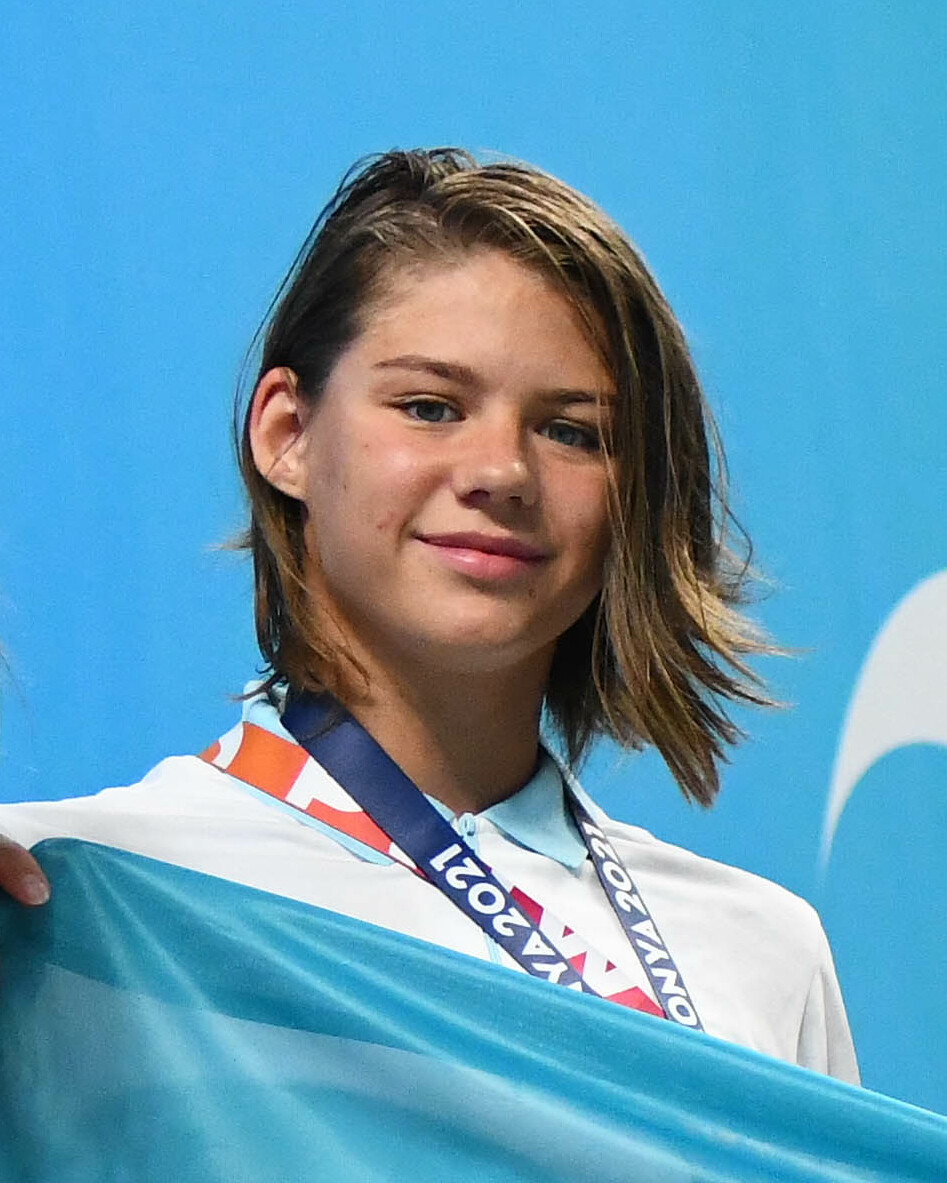
- Pchelintseva in 2021

Personal information
- Native name: Аделаида Пчелинцева
- Nationality: Kazakhstani
- Born: 29 September 1999 (age 26)

Sport
- Sport: Swimming
Medal record
Women's swimming
Representing Kazakhstan
Islamic Solidarity Games
Gold medal – first place	2021 Konya	50 m breaststroke
Silver medal – second place	2021 Konya	4x100 m medley
Bronze medal – third place	2021 Konya	100 m breaststroke
Bronze medal – third place	2021 Konya	4x100 m freestyle

Adelaida Vladimirovna Pchelintseva (Russian: Аделаида Владимировна Пчелинцева; born 29 September 1999) is a Kazakhstani swimmer. She competed in the women's 50 metre breaststroke at the 2019 World Aquatics Championships held in Gwangju, South Korea and she did not advance to compete in the semi-finals.
