= Emre Sakçı =

Turkish swimmer (born 1997)

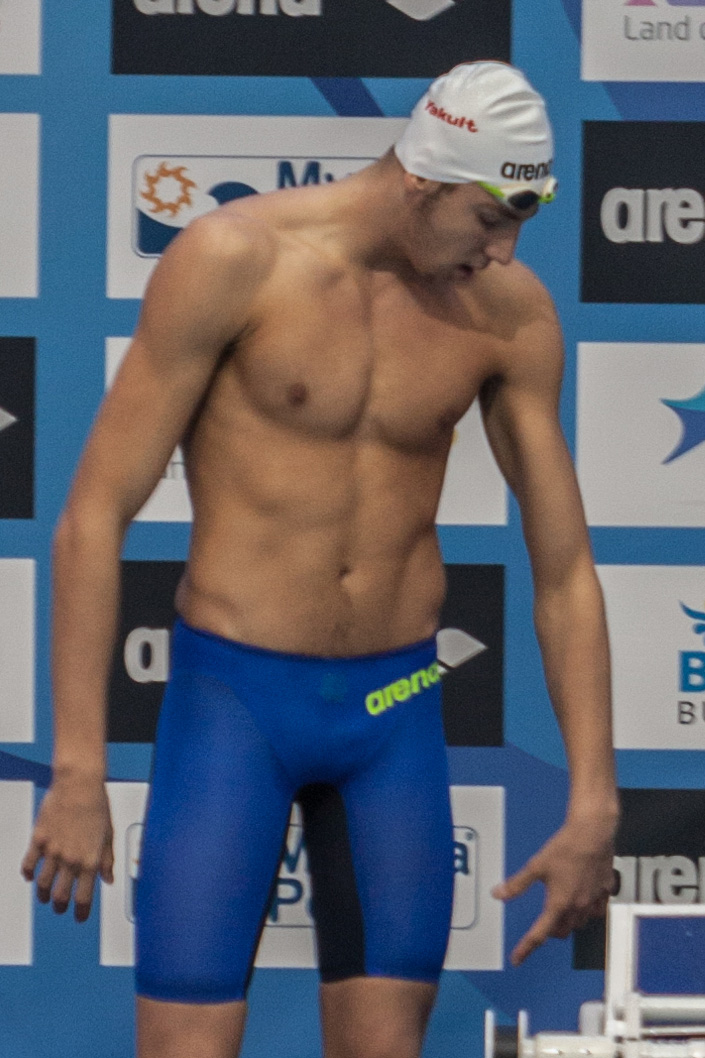

Personal information
- Full name: Hüseyin Emre Sakçı
- Born: 15 November 1997 (age 28) İzmir, Turkey
- Height: 2.03 m (6 ft 8 in)
- Weight: 100 kg (220 lb)

Sport
- Sport: Swimming
- Strokes: Breaststroke
Medal record
Men's swimming
Representing Turkey
World Championships (SC)
Silver medal – second place	2024 Budapest	50 m breaststroke
European Championships (LC)
Gold medal – first place	2024 Belgrade	50 m breaststroke
European Championships (SC)
Silver medal – second place	2019 Glasgow	50 m breaststroke
Silver medal – second place	2021 Kazan	50 m breaststroke
Silver medal – second place	2025 Lublin	50 m breaststroke
Silver medal – second place	2025 Lublin	100 m breaststroke
Bronze medal – third place	2023 Otopeni	50 m breaststroke
Islamic Solidarity Games
Gold medal – first place	2017 Baku	4 × 100 m freestyle
Gold medal – first place	2021 Konya	50 m freestyle
Gold medal – first place	2021 Konya	50 m breaststroke
Gold medal – first place	2021 Konya	4×100 m freestyle
Gold medal – first place	2025 Riyadh	50 m breaststroke
Gold medal – first place	2025 Riyadh	100 m breaststroke
Gold medal – first place	2025 Riyadh	4×100 m freestyle
Gold medal – first place	2025 Riyadh	4×100 m medley
Gold medal – first place	2025 Riyadh	4×100 m mixed medley
Silver medal – second place	2017 Baku	50 m freestyle
Silver medal – second place	2017 Baku	50 m breaststroke
Silver medal – second place	2017 Baku	100 m breaststroke
Silver medal – second place	2021 Konya	4×100 m medley
Bronze medal – third place	2021 Konya	100 m freestyle
Bronze medal – third place	2021 Konya	100 m breaststroke
Mediterranean Games
Gold medal – first place	2026 Taranto	50 m breaststroke
Silver medal – second place	2022 Oran	50 m breaststroke
Silver medal – second place	2022 Oran	100 m breaststroke
Bronze medal – third place	2018 Tarragona	4×100 m freestyle relay

Hüseyin Emre Sakçı (born 15 November 1997) is a Turkish swimmer specialized in breaststroke. Sakçı holds the short-course world record in 50 meters breaststroke (24.95) and the Turkish short-course records in 50 meters freestyle, 100 meters freestyle, 200 meters freestyle, 50 meters breaststroke, 100 meters breaststroke, 100 meters individual medley as well as long-course records in 50 meters freestyle, 50 meters breaststroke and 100 meters breaststroke.

== Career ==
In a first ever for Turkish swimming, Sakçı won the silver medal in the 2019 European Short Course Championship in the 50 meter breaststroke with a time of 25.82 seconds. Subsequently, Sakçı broke the short-course European record in 50 meters breaststroke with a time of 25.50 seconds on 26 October 2020 during the 2020 ISL (International Swimming League) races making him the only Turkish swimmer ever to break a European record in any stroke not in the junior category.

Sakçı further advanced his European Short Course 50 meter breaststroke record on 5 November 2020 again during the ISL competitions, only 0.04 seconds off the World record. Sakçı added a third European short-course record, this time in 100 meters breaststroke, with a time of 55.74, .13 seconds off the World record.

On 27 December 2021, during the Turkish Short Course Championships in Gaziantep, Sakçı broke the World Record in the 50 meter breaststroke (short course) with a time of 24.95 seconds.

Sakçı qualified for the 2020 Tokyo Olympics with Olympic A qualification standard time in 100 meters breaststroke.

=== Training ===
Sakçı belongs to a new generation of Turkish swimmers that have solely trained in Turkey instead of going to the US for college, as was done in the past by successful Turkish swimmers. Sakçı trains in his hometown of İzmir with his coach Türker Oktay.

Records
Preceded by (South Africa) Cameron van der Burgh with (Belarus) Ilya Shymanovich	Men's 50-metre breaststroke world record holder (short course); 27 December 2021 – present	Succeeded by Incumbent
