= Yiğit Aslan =

Turkish swimmer (born 2003)

Personal information
- Nationality: Turkish
- Born: 11 March 2003 (age 23)

Sport
- Sport: Swimming
- Strokes: Freestyle
- Club: Enka SK
- College team: University of Wisconsin–Madison
Medal record
Men's swimming
Representing Turkey
Islamic Solidarity Games
Gold medal – first place	2021 Konya	400 m freestyle
Gold medal – first place	2021 Konya	4x200 m freestyle
Silver medal – second place	2021 Konya	800 m freestyle
Silver medal – second place	2021 Konya	1500 m freestyle
European Junior Championships
Gold medal – first place	2021 Rome	800 m freestyle
Bronze medal – third place	2021 Rome	1500 m freestyle
European Youth Olympic Festival
Bronze medal – third place	2019 Baku	4×100 m freestyle

Yiğit Aslan (born 11 March 2003) is a Turkish swimmer competing in freestyle events. He obtained a quota for the 2020 Summer Olympics.

Inspired by a poster about a swimming course in a shopping mall, he started swimming sport at the age of ten. Aslan is a member of Enka SK. He was coached by the Italian Corrado Rosso in the national team.

He won the bronze medal in the 4 × 100 m freestyle relay event at the 2019 European Youth Summer Olympic Festival held in Baku, Azerbaijan. He competed in the 400 m, 800 m, 1500 m and 4 × 200 m freestyle relay events of the 2020 European Aquatics Championships in Budapest, Hungary.

As of January 2021, he was the owner of 38 national records in various events and age categories, all set in the last five years. He is the holder of national records in the 800 m (7:51.60) and 1500 m (14:44.03) events. At the 2020 European Aquatics Championships in Budapest, Hungary, he set a new national record with 3:50.59 in the 400 m juniors (age 17–18) event.
