= Azzahra Permatahani =

Indonesian swimmer (born 2002)

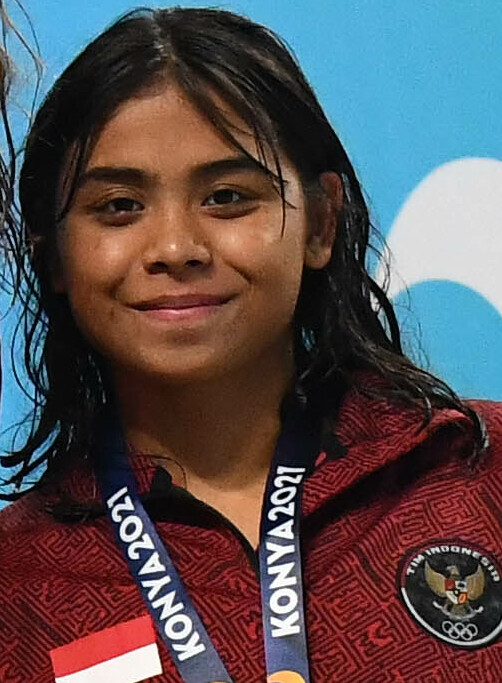

Personal information
- Born: 7 January 2002 (age 24) Jakarta, Indonesia
- Home town: Pekanbaru, Indonesia
- Height: 162 cm (5 ft 4 in)
- Weight: 50 kg (110 lb)

Sport
- Sport: Swimming
Medal record
Women's swimming
Event	1st	2nd	3rd
Islamic Solidarity Games	0	7	5
SEA Games	0	2	2
ASEAN University Games	2	2	4
Total	2	11	11
Representing Indonesia
Islamic Solidarity Games
Silver medal – second place	2017 Baku	400 m medley
Silver medal – second place	2021 Konya	4x100 m freestyle
Silver medal – second place	2021 Konya	4x200 m freestyle
Silver medal – second place	2025 Riyadh	200 m medley
Silver medal – second place	2025 Riyadh	4x100 m medley
Silver medal – second place	2025 Riyadh	Mixed 4x100 m freestyle
Silver medal – second place	2025 Riyadh	Mixed 4x100 m medley
Bronze medal – third place	2021 Konya	4x100 m medley
Bronze medal – third place	2021 Konya	200 m medley
Bronze medal – third place	2021 Konya	400 m medley
Bronze medal – third place	2021 Konya	200 m breaststroke
Bronze medal – third place	2025 Riyadh	4x100 m freestyle
SEA Games
Silver medal – second place	2017 Kuala Lumpur	400 m medley
Silver medal – second place	2019 Philippines	200 m medley
Bronze medal – third place	2019 Philippines	400 m medley
Bronze medal – third place	2021 Vietnam	4x200 m freestyle
ASEAN University Games
Gold medal – first place	2022 Ubon Ratchathani	400 m medley
Gold medal – first place	2022 Ubon Ratchathani	4x200 m freestyle
Silver medal – second place	2022 Ubon Ratchathani	200 m breaststroke
Silver medal – second place	2022 Ubon Ratchathani	4x100 m medley
Bronze medal – third place	2022 Ubon Ratchathani	100 m backstroke
Bronze medal – third place	2022 Ubon Ratchathani	200 m backstroke
Bronze medal – third place	2022 Ubon Ratchathani	100 m breaststroke
Bronze medal – third place	2022 Ubon Ratchathani	200 m medley

Azzahra Permatahani (born 7 January 2002) is an Indonesian swimmer.

In 2017, she won the silver medal in the women's 400 metre individual medley at the 2017 Islamic Solidarity Games held in Baku, Azerbaijan. In the same year, she competed in the women's 400 metre individual medley event at the 2017 World Aquatics Championships held in Budapest, Hungary. In this event she did not advance to compete in the final. The following year, she represented Indonesia at the 2018 Asian Games held in Jakarta, Indonesia. In 2018, she also competed at the Summer Youth Olympics held in Buenos Aires, Argentina.

In 2019, Permatahani represented Indonesia at the World Aquatics Championships held in Gwangju, South Korea. She competed in the women's 400 metre individual medley event and she did not advance to compete in the final.

In 2021, she competed in the 2020 Summer Olympics competing in Women's 400 metre individual medley.

Permatahani won multiple medals at the 2022 ASEAN University Games held in Ubon Ratchathani, Thailand.

She also competed for Indonesia at the 2024 Summer Olympics.
