= Joe Kurniawan =

Indonesian swimmer (born 2001)

Personal information
- Full name: Joe Aditya Wijaya Kurniawan
- Born: 2 August 2001 (age 25) Jakarta, Indonesia

Sport
- Sport: Swimming
Medal record
Islamic Solidarity Games
Silver medal – second place	2025 Riyadh	Mixed 4×100 m freestyle
Bronze medal – third place	2021 Konya	4×200 m freestyle
Bronze medal – third place	2025 Riyadh	4×100 m medley
SEA Games
Silver medal – second place	2021 Vietnam	4×100 m freestyle relay
Silver medal – second place	2025 Thailand	100 m butterfly
Bronze medal – third place	2023 Cambodia	4×100 m freestyle relay

Joe Aditya Wijaya Kurniawan (born 2 August 2001) is an Indonesian swimmer. He competed in the men's 100 metre butterfly at the 2024 Summer Olympics.
