= Flairene Candrea =

Indonesian swimmer (born 2005)

Personal information
- Nationality: Indonesia
- Born: 19 January 2005 (age 21) Jakarta, Indonesia

Sport
- Sport: Swimming
Medal record
Women's swimming
Representing Indonesia
Islamic Solidarity Games
Silver medal – second place	2025 Riyadh	4x100 m medley
Bronze medal – third place	2025 Riyadh	50 m backstroke
Bronze medal – third place	2025 Riyadh	100 m backstroke
Bronze medal – third place	2025 Riyadh	4x100 m freestyle
SEA Games
Gold medal – first place	2021 Vietnam	100 m backstroke
Bronze medal – third place	2025 Thailand	100 m backstroke

Flairene Candrea Wonomiharjo (born January 19, 2005) is a swimmer from Indonesia. She won a gold medal at the 2021 SEA Games in Hanoi in the 100m backstroke. She also won gold in artistic swimming at the 2021 National Sports Week in Papua representing Jakarta. She was the flag bearer of the Indonesian team at the opening ceremony of the 2023 Southeast Asian Games in Cambodia.

== Personal life ==
She was born in Jakarta, Indonesia on 19 January 2005. She started to learn swimming when she was six years old. At age 10, she began enrolling in the artistic swimming course.

In February 2022, she participated in national training for three months for the 2023 SEA Games preparation.
