= Nehir Toker =

Turkish swimmer (born 2005)

Personal information
- National team: Turkey
- Born: 24 August 2005 (age 20) Manisa, Turkey

Sport
- Sport: Swimming
- Strokes: Freestyle
- Club: Fenerbahçe Swimming
Medal record
Women's swimming
Representing Turkey
Islamic Solidarity Games
Gold medal – first place	2025 Riyadh	Mixed 4 × 100 m freestyle relay
Gold medal – first place	2025 Riyadh	4 × 100 m freestyle

Nehir Toker (born 24 August 2005) is a Turkish swimmer who specializes in freestyle swimming.

== Sport career ==
Toker started her competitive swimming career at Manisa Metropılitan Municipality Sports Club in her hometown before she transferred to Fenerbahçe Swimming in October 2022.

She captured two gold medals at the 2025 Islamic Solidarity Games in Riyadh, Saudi Arabia, including in the mixed 4 × 100 m freestyle relay, and 4 × 100 m freestyle events.

== Personal life ==
Nehir Toker was born in Manisa, Turkey on 24 August 2005.
