= Turkey at the 2013 Islamic Solidarity Games =

- IOC code: TUR
- NOC: Turkish Olympic Committee

in Palembang, Indonesia
- Medals: Gold 23 Silver 30 Bronze 50 Total 103

Islamic Solidarity Games appearances (overview)
- 2005; 2013; 2017; 2021; 2025

Turkey participated in the 2013 Islamic Solidarity Games held in Palembang, Indonesia from 18 September to 1 October 2013. 160 athletes from Turkey were registered to compete in 12 sports at the Games. Turkish competitors brought home 103 medals, including 23 golds.

== Medalists ==
Medal	Name	Sport	Event	Date
Gold	İlham Tanui Özbilen	Athletics	Men's 1500 m	25 September
Gold	Ali Kaya	Athletics	Men's 10.000 m	25 September
Gold	Tarık Langat Akdağ	Athletics	Men's 3000 m steeplechase	25 September
Gold	Burcu Yüksel	Athletics	Women's high jump	25 September
Gold	Buse Arıkazan	Athletics	Women's pole vault	25 September
Gold	Elçin Kaya	Athletics	Women's discus throw	25 September
Gold	Saliha Özyurt; Birsen Engin; Sema Apak; Nimet Karakuş	Athletics	Women's 4 × 100 m relay	29 September
Gold	Neslihan Yiğit	Badminton	Women's singles	30 September
Gold	Turkey men's national basketball team	Basketball	Men's team	20 September
Gold	Merve Çoban	Karate	Women's kumite −68 kg	25 September
Gold	Demir Atasoy	Swimming	Men's 50 m breaststroke	24 September
Gold	Demir Atasoy	Swimming	Men's 100 m breaststroke	24 September
Gold	Esra Kübra Kaçmaz	Swimming	Women's 100 m freestyle	24 September
Gold	Halime Zülal Zeren	Swimming	Women's 200 m freestyle	24 September
Gold	Halime Zülal Zeren	Swimming	Women's 50 m backstroke	24 September
Gold	Halime Zülal Zeren	Swimming	Women's 200 m backstroke	24 September
Gold	Gizem Bozkurt	Swimming	Women's 200 m individual medley	24 September
Gold	Alpkan Örnek; Nezir Karap; Demir Atasoy; Doğa Çelik	Swimming	Men's 4 × 100 m relay	29 September
Gold	Güven Duvan; Demir Atasoy; Gönen Kara; Doğa Çelik	Swimming	Men's 4 × 100 m medley relay	29 September
Gold	Gizem Bozkurt; Ceren Dilek; Esra Kübra Kaçmaz; Halime Zülal Zeren	Swimming	Women's 4 × 100 m freestyle relay	29 September
Gold	Esra Kübra Kaçmaz; Melisa Akarsu; Gizem Bozkurt; Halime Zülal Zeren	Swimming	Women's 4 × 200 m freestyle relay	29 September
Gold	Dürdane Altunel	Taekwondo	Women's kyorugi 62 kg	1 October
Gold	Elif Akyüz	Wushu	Women's taolu Jianshu & Qiangshu	28 September
Silver	Ali Kaya	Athletics	Men's 5.000 m	25 September
Silver	Mehmet Güzel	Athletics	Men's 400 m hurdles	25 September
Silver	Fatih Avan	Athletics	Men's javelin throw	25 September
Silver	Nimet Karakuş	Athletics	Women's 100 m	25 September
Silver	Elif Karabulut	Athletics	Women's 3000 m steeplechase	25 September
Silver	Sevim Sinmez Serbest	Athletics	Women's high jump	25 September
Silver	Elmas Seda Fırtına	Athletics	Women's pole vault	25 September
Silver	Batuhan Altıntaş; Halit Kılıç; Mehmet Güzel; İlham Tanui Özbilen	Athletics	Men's 4 × 400 m relay	29 September
Silver	Özge Akın; Birsen Engin; Esma Aydemir; Sema Apak	Athletics	Women's 4 × 400 m relay	29 September
Silver	Emre Aslan; Hüseyin Oruç	Badminton	Men's doubles	30 September
Silver	Bigem Giroğlu	Karate	Women's individual kata	25 September
Silver	Neslihan Çalışkan	Karate	Women's kumite −50 kg	25 September
Silver	Doğa Çelik	Swimming	Men's 100 m freestyle	24 September
Silver	Nezir Karap	Swimming	Men's 200 m freestyle	24 September
Silver	Güven Duvan	Swimming	Men's 50 m backstroke	24 September
Silver	Güven Duvan	Swimming	Men's 100 m backstroke	24 September
Silver	Gönen Kara	Swimming	Men's 200 m butterfly	24 September
Silver	Alpkan Örnek	Swimming	Men's 400 m individual medley	24 September
Silver	Gizem Bozkurt	Swimming	Women's 100 m freestyle	24 September
Silver	Esra Kübra Kaçmaz	Swimming	Women's 50 m butterfly	24 September
Silver	Esra Kübra Kaçmaz	Swimming	Women's 100 m butterfly	24 September
Silver	Melisa Akarsu	Swimming	Women's 400 m individual medley	24 September
Silver	Alpkan Örnek; Demir Atasoy; Nezir Karap; Doğa Çelik	Swimming	4 × 200 m freestyle relay	29 September
Silver	Umut Bildik	Taekwondo	Men's kyorugi 63 kg	1 October
Silver	Gökhan Coşar	Taekwondo	Men's kyorugi 68 kg	1 October
Silver	Serdar Yüksel	Taekwondo	Men's kyorugi +87 kg	1 October
Silver	Nafia Kuş	Taekwondo	Women's kyorugi +73 kg	1 October
Silver	Elif Soytürk Akın; Elif Aybüke Yılmaz; Serim Olgun Kahveci	Taekwondo	Women's poomsae team	1 October
Silver	Nezir Sağır	Weightlifting	Men's 85 kg	27 September
Silver	Hale Beyza Sarıyıldız	Wushu	Women's taolu Jianshu & Qiangshu	28 September
Bronze	İlham Tanui Özbilen	Athletics	Men's 800 m	25 September
Bronze	Aşkın Karaca	Athletics	Men's triple jump	25 September
Bronze	Hüseyin Atıcı	Athletics	Men's shot put	25 September
Bronze	İrfan Yıldırım	Athletics	Men's discus throw	25 September
Bronze	Tuğba Koyuncu	Athletics	Women's 800 m	25 September
Bronze	Özge Akın	Athletics	Women's 400 m hurdles	25 September
Bronze	Sema Apak	Athletics	Women's long jump	25 September
Bronze	Elçin Kaya	Athletics	Women's shot put	25 September
Bronze	Emre Vural	Badminton	Men's singles	30 September
Bronze	Emre Lale; Emre Vural	Badminton	Men's doubles	30 September
Bronze	Ramazan Öztürk; Neslihan Kılıç	Badminton	Mixed doubles	30 September
Bronze	Emre Aslan; Emre Lale; Emre Vural; Hüseyin Oruç; Ramazan Öztürk	Badminton	Men's team	30 September
Bronze	Özge Bayrak; Cemre Fere; Neslihan Kılıç; Neslihan Yiğit	Badminton	Women's team	30 September
Bronze	Turkey national under-20 football team	Football	Men's team	29 September
Bronze	Mehmet Yakan	Karate	Men's individual kata	25 September
Bronze	İdris Demir	Karate	Men's kumite −67 kg	25 September
Bronze	Necati Pınarbaşı	Karate	Men's kumite −75 kg	25 September
Bronze	Yavuz Karamollaoğlu	Karate	Men's kumite −84 kg	25 September
Bronze	Büşra Tosun	Karate	Women's kumite −55 kg	25 September
Bronze	Ece Yaşar	Karate	Women's kumite −61 kg	25 September
Bronze	Hilal Gök	Karate	Women's kumite +68 kg	25 September
Bronze	Turkey national team kumite	Karate	Women's team kumite	25 September
Bronze	Kübra Dişçi; Çağla Barış; Bigem Giroğlu	Karate	Women's team kata	25 September
Bronze	Doğa Çelik	Swimming	Men's 50 m freestyle	24 September
Bronze	Nezir Karap	Swimming	Men's 400 m freestyle	24 September
Bronze	Nezir Karap	Swimming	Men's 800 m freestyle	24 September
Bronze	Alpkan Örnek	Swimming	Men's 200 m breaststroke	24 September
Bronze	Alpkan Örnek	Swimming	Men's 200 m individual medley	24 September
Bronze	Ayşe Ezgi Yazıcı	Swimming	Women's 50 m butterfly	24 September
Bronze	Ayşe Ezgi Yazıcı	Swimming	Women's 100 m butterfly	24 September
Bronze	Melisa Akarsu	Swimming	Women's 200 m butterfly	24 September
Bronze	Halime Zülal Zeren; Ceren Dilek; Ayşe Ezgi Yazıcı; Gizem Bozkurt	Swimming	Women's 4 × 100 m medley relay	29 September
Bronze	Ali Kemal Ustabaş	Taekwondo	Poomsae men's individual	1 October
Bronze	Adil Tekin; Serim Olgun Kahveci	Taekwondo	Poomsae mixed pair	1 October
Bronze	Ömer Ramazan Evez	Taekwondo	Men's kyorugi 58 kg	1 October
Bronze	Rıdvan Akın	Taekwondo	Men's kyorugi 74 kg	1 October
Bronze	Burak Ozan Karaca	Taekwondo	Men's kyorugi 80 kg	1 October
Bronze	Şeyma Tuncer	Taekwondo	Women's kyorugi 53 kg	1 October
Bronze	Barış Fırat	Tennis	Men's singles	29 September
Bronze	Barkın Yalçınkale	Tennis	Men's singles	29 September
Bronze	Melis Bayraktaroğlu	Tennis	Women's singles	29 September
Bronze	Gökberk Ergeneman; Barkın Yalçınkale	Tennis	Men's doubles	29 September
Bronze	Altuğ Çelikbilek; Barış Fırat	Tennis	Men's doubles	29 September
Bronze	Melis Bayraktaroğlu; Hazal Ünlügenç	Tennis	Women's doubles	29 September
Bronze	Gülben Güldaş; Ege Tomey	Tennis	Women's doubles	29 September
Bronze	Altuğ Çelikbilek; Barış Fırat; Barkın Yalçınkale; Gökberk Ergeneman	Tennis	Men's team	29 September
Bronze	Melis Bayraktaroğlu; Gülben Güldaş; Ege Tomey; Hazal Ünlügenç	Tennis	Women's team	29 September
Bronze	Turkey men's national volleyball team	Volleyball	Men's team	30 September
Bronze	Ali Ay	Wushu	Men's sanda 60 kg	28 September
Bronze	Ömer Allar	Wushu	Men's sanda 70 kg	28 September

Medals by sport
Sport	1st place, gold medalist(s)	2nd place, silver medalist(s)	3rd place, bronze medalist(s)	Total
Athletics	7	9	8	24
Badminton	1	1	5	7
Basketball	1	0	0	1
Football	0	0	1	1
Karate	1	2	9	12
Swimming	11	11	9	31
Taekwondo	1	5	6	12
Tennis	0	0	9	9
Volleyball	0	0	1	1
Weightlifting	0	1	0	1
Wushu	1	1	2	4
Total	23	30	50	103
