= Turkish women in sports =

Women of Turkey that practice sports

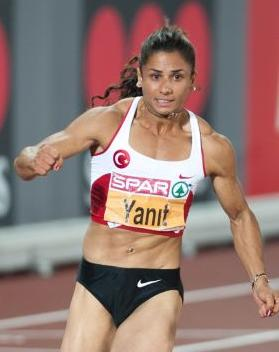
Nevin Yanıt

Turkish women have an active participation in many sports branches and have won several important trophies, especially in athletics, weightlifting, combat sports, volleyball and basketball.

== Pioneers ==
- Berna Gözbaşı, first Turkish woman to chair a top-flight men's football club.
- Lale Orta (born 1960), first Turkish female football referee with FIFA badge, and first woman to chair the Central Arbitration Committee of the Turkish Football Federation.
- Derya Açıkgçz (born 1977), first Turkish weightlifter to win a medal at the world championships.
- Begüm Kübra Tokyay (born 1993), first Turkish female head official of American football.
- Berna Yurtsever, first Turkish female boxing referee with AIBA 3-star badge.
- Emine Dursun (born 2001), first Tırkidh female darts plsyer to compete internationally.

== Participation in Olympics ==
=== Pioneers ===
The first Turkish women to take part in the Olympic Games were Halet Çambel and Suat Fetgeri Aşani who participated in the fencing competitions of the 1936 Summer Olympics in Berlin.

=== Medals ===
Olympics	Name	Event	Rank
1992	Hülya Şenyurt	Judo 48 kg	Bronze
2000	Hamide Bıçkın	Taekwondo 57 kg	Bronze
2004	Nurcan Taylan	Weightlifting 48 kg	Gold
2008	Azize Tanrıkulu	Taekwondo 57 kg	Silver
2012	Nur Tatar	Taekwondo 67 kg	Silver
2016	Nur Tatar	Taekwondo 67 kg	Bronze
2020	Busenaz Sürmeneli	Boxing welterweight	Gold
2020	Buse Naz Çakıroğlu	Boxing flyweight	Silver
2020	Hatice Kübra İlgün	Taekwondo 57 kg	Bronze
2020	Yasemin Adar	Wrestling freestyle 76 kg	Bronze
2020	Merve Çoban	Karate 61 kg	Bronze

== Archery ==
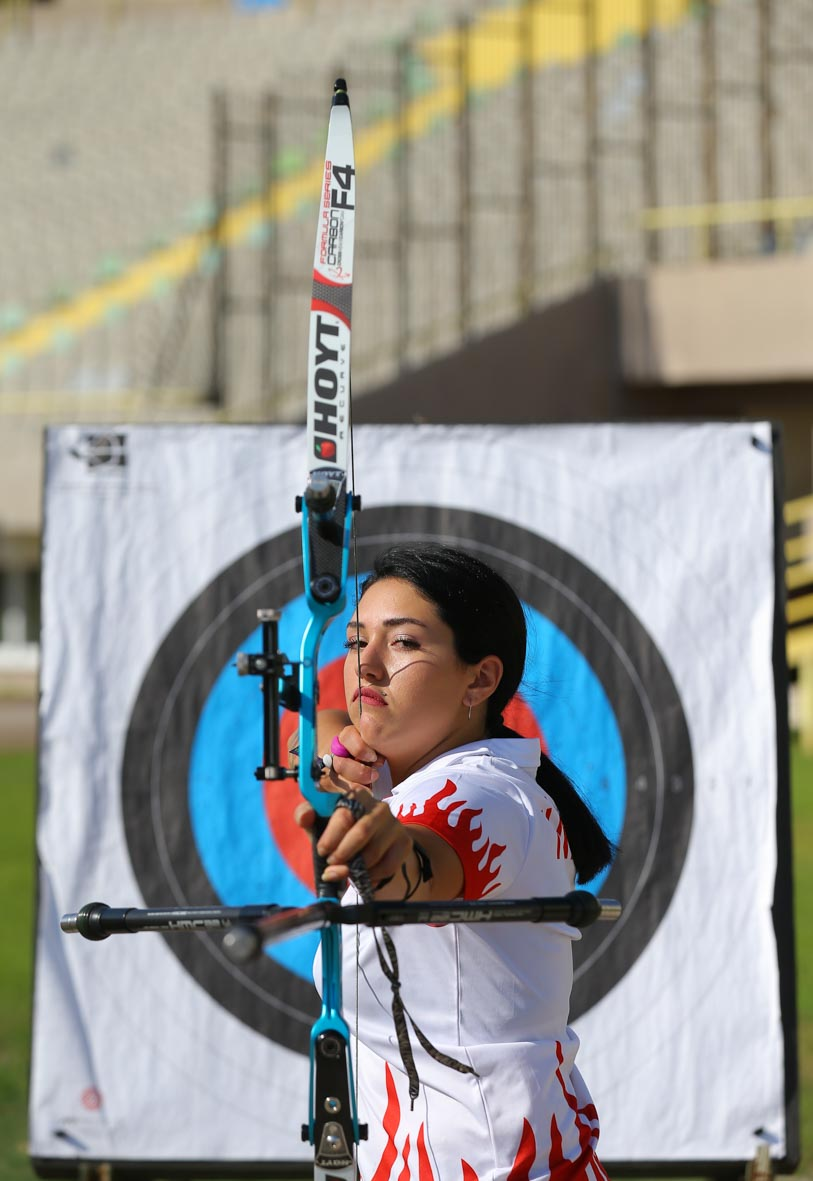
Yasemin Ecem Anagöz, archer.

- Yasemin Ecem Anagöz (born 1998), European (2018) and Mediterranean Games (2022) and Islamic Solidarity Games (2021) champion
- Ezgi Başaran (born 2003), Mediterranean Games (2022) champion
- Yeşim Bostan (born 1995), Islamic Solidarity Games (2021) champion
- Gülnaz Büşranur Coşkun (born 1999), European (2018, 2022) and Mediterranean Games (2022) and Islamic Solidarity Games (2021) champion
- Aslı Er, Islamic Solidarity Games (2021) champion
- Ayşe Bera Süzer (born 1996), Islamic Solidarity Games (2021) champion
- Gizem Özkan (born 2002), Mediterranean Ganes (2026) in team, champion
- Necla Şahin, Islamic Solidarity Games (2021) champion
- Dünya Yenihayat (born 2009), Mediterranean Games (2026) in tea, champion
- Sevim Yıldır, Islamic Solidarity Games (2021) champion

== Arm wrestling ==
- Esma Nur Çakmak (born 2004)
- Elif Su İltaş (born 2011), world (2025, 2026), European (2026) champion
- Esra Kiraz (born 1992), World (2009, 2017, 2018, 2019, 2021, 2022), European (2011, 2015, 2016, 2018, 2022) champion
- Gülendam Sarıbal (born 1972)
- Şükriye Yılmaz (born 2001)

== Athletics ==
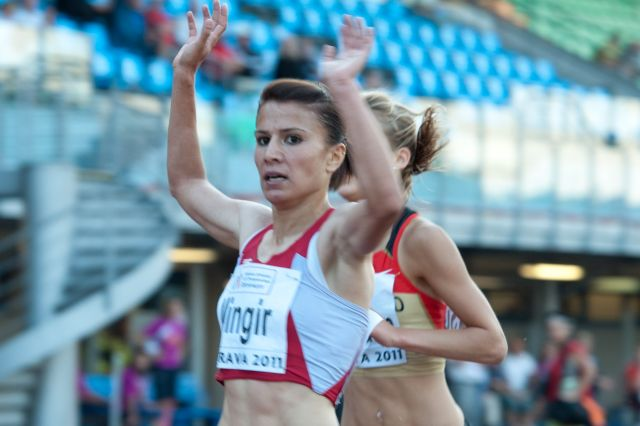
Gülcan Mıngır, middle-distance runner

=== World Athletics Championship ===
Year	Name	Event	Rank
2003	Süreyya Ayhan	1500 m.	Silver
2009	Karin Melis Mey	Long jump	Bronze

=== European Athletics Championship ===
Year	Name	Event	Rank
2002	Süreyya Ayhan	1500 m.	Gold
2006	Elvan Abeylegesse	5000 m.	Bronze
2010	Elvan Abeylegesse	5000 m.	Gold
2010	Elvan Abeylegesse	10000 m.	Gold
2010	Nevin Yanıt	100 m. hurdles	Gold
2012	Gülcan Mıngır	3000 m. steeplechase	Gold
2023	Tuğba Danışmaz	triple jump Indoor	Gold

=== Athletics in Mediterranean Games ===
Year	Name	Event	Rank
1987	Serap Aksu	400 m. hurdles	Silver
1991	Aysel Taş	Javelin	Bronze
1997	Serap Aktaş	Marathon	Gold
1997	Lale Öztürk	Marathon	Bronze
2001	Nora Güner	100 m.	Gold
2001	Nora Güner	200 m.	Gold
2001	Süreyya Ayhan	1500 m.	Silver
2001	Ebru Kavaklıoğlu	1500 m.	Bronze
2001	Ebru Kavaklıoğlu	5000 m.	Gold
2001	Elvan Abeylegesse	10000 m.	Bronze
2001	Mehtap Sızmaz	Marathon	Gold
2001	Serap Aktaş	Marathon	Silver
2001	Anzhela Atroshchenko	Heptathlon	Gold
2005	Binnaz Uslu	800 m.	Bronze
2005	Anzhela Atroshchenko	Heptathlon	Bronze
2005	Turkish team	4 × 400 m.	Bronze
2009	Nevin Yanıt	100 m. hurdles	Gold
2009	Elvan Abeylegesse	10000 m.	Gold
2009	Burcu Ayhan	high jump	Silver
2009	Karin Melis Mey	long jump	Silver

- Şevval Ayaz, Islamic Solidarity Games (2021) champion
- Buse Arkazan, pole vault, Islamic Solidarity Games champion (2021)
- Özlem Becerek (born 2002), discus throw, Islamic Solidarity Games champion (2021)
- Yasemin Can (born 1996), European (2016), European Cross Country (2016, 20117, 2018, 2019), Mediterranean Games (2022) and Islamic Solidarity Games champion (2021)
- Emel Dereli (1996), shot put, Islamic Solidarity Games champion (2021)
- Ekaterina Guliyev (born 1991), Mediterranean Games (2022) and Islamic Solidarity Games champion (2021)
- Sıla Koloğlu (born 2004), sprint, Mediterranean Games (2026), Balkan İndoor Championshps (2024) champion
- Simay zçiftçi (born 2003), sprint, Mediterranean Games (2026) champion
- Demet Parlak pole vault, Islamic Solidarity Games champion (2021)
- Esra Türkmen javelin throw

, Islamic Solidarity Games (2021) champion

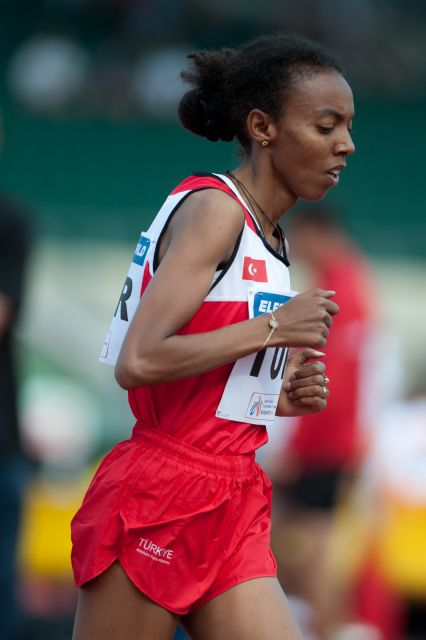
Elvan Abeylegesse

== Badminton ==
- Yasemen Bektaş (born 2003), Mediterranean Games (2026) champion in mixed doubles
- Bengisu Erçetin (born 2001), Mediterranean Games champion in doubles (2022)
- Neslihan Yiğit (born 1994), Islamic Solidarity Games (2013) and Mediterranean Games champion (2013, 2018, 2022)

== Basketball ==
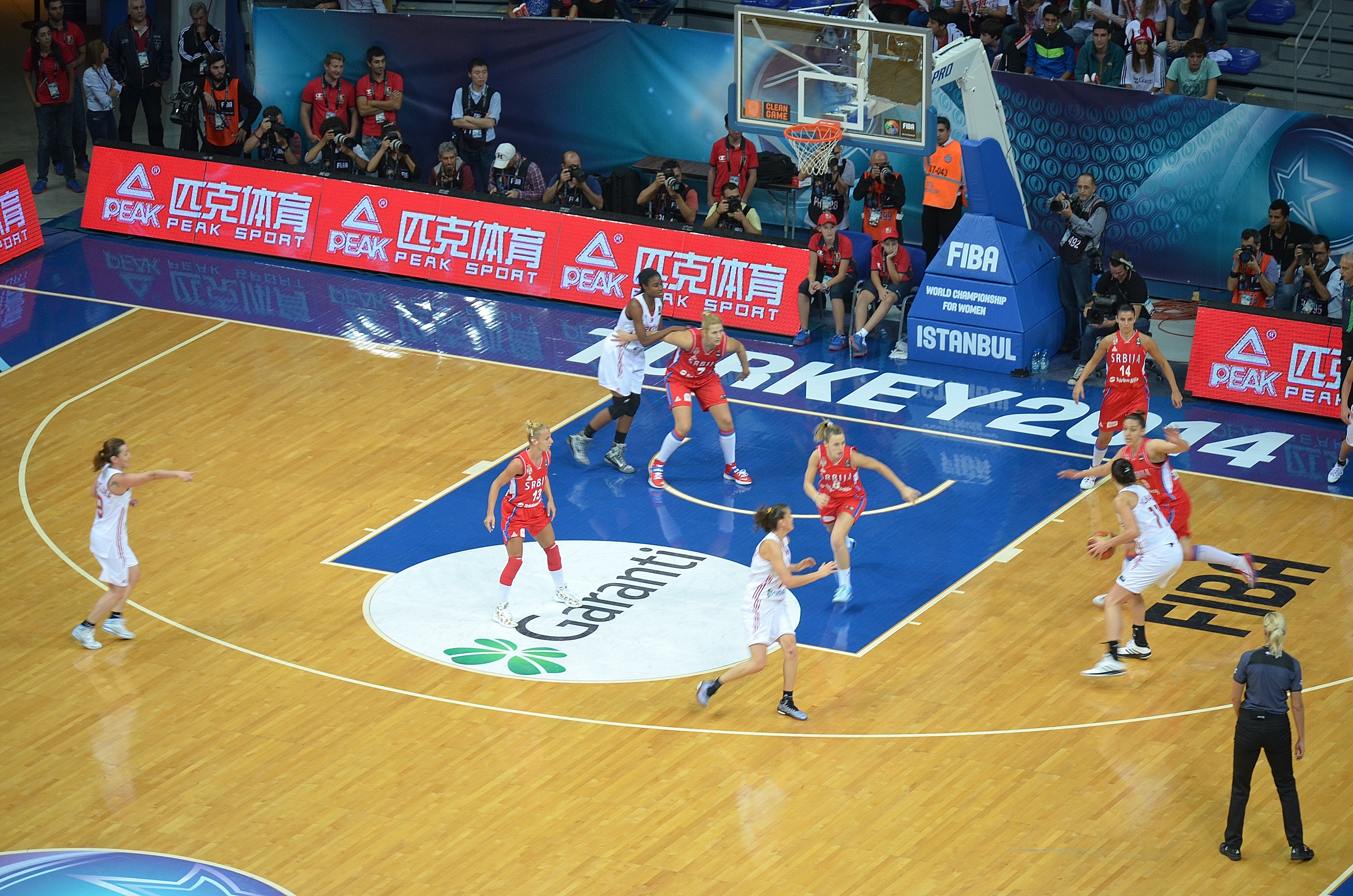
Turkey (white) vs. Serbia at the 2014 FIBA World Championship for Women

The Turkey women's national basketball team, also known as "Periler" (The Fairies) by the Turkish fans, is No 13 in FIBA World Rankings.

European Women Basketball Championship

Year	City	Rank
2011	Łódź, Poland	Silver
2013	Orchies, France	Bronze

Mediterranean Games

Year	City	Rank
1987	Latakia, Syria	Silver
2005	Almeria, Spain	Gold

Players

- Nevriye Yılmaz (born 1980), retired national team player
- Birsel Vardarlı (born 1984), retired national team player
- Işıl Alben (born 1986), team captain
- Sevgi Uzun, (born 1996) WNBA player

Referees

- Özlem Yalman (born 1977), FIBA-listed referee since 2011.
- Funda Teoman (born 1984), referee

== Billiards ==
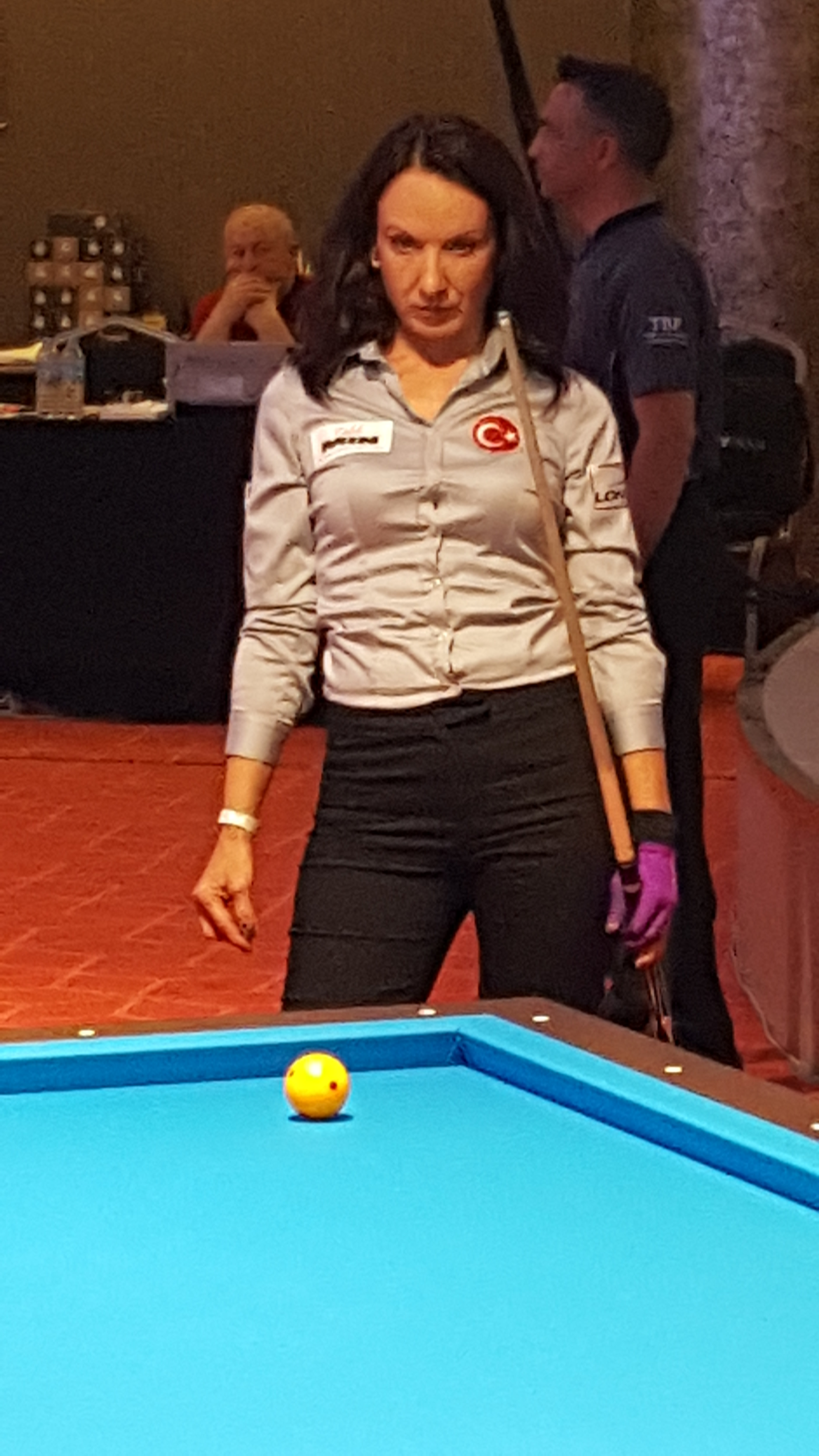
Gülşen Degener (2018)

Three-cushion

- Gülşen Degener (born 1968), European Women’s Cup (2003, 2004) champion
- Güzin Müjde Karakaşlı (born 1991), European Championships silver medalist (2023)

== Bocce ==
- Rukiye Varol, Islamic Solidatity Games (2021) champion
- Bahar Çil Mediterranean Geams champion (2022)
- Buket Öztürk (born 2001), World (2018), European (2024), Mediterranean Games (2022) champion
- İnci Ece Öztürk (born 1997), World (2023), European (2024), Mediterranean Games (2018, 2022), Islamic Solidarity Games (2021) champion
- Mine Türker (born 2006), European (2024) champion

== Boxing ==
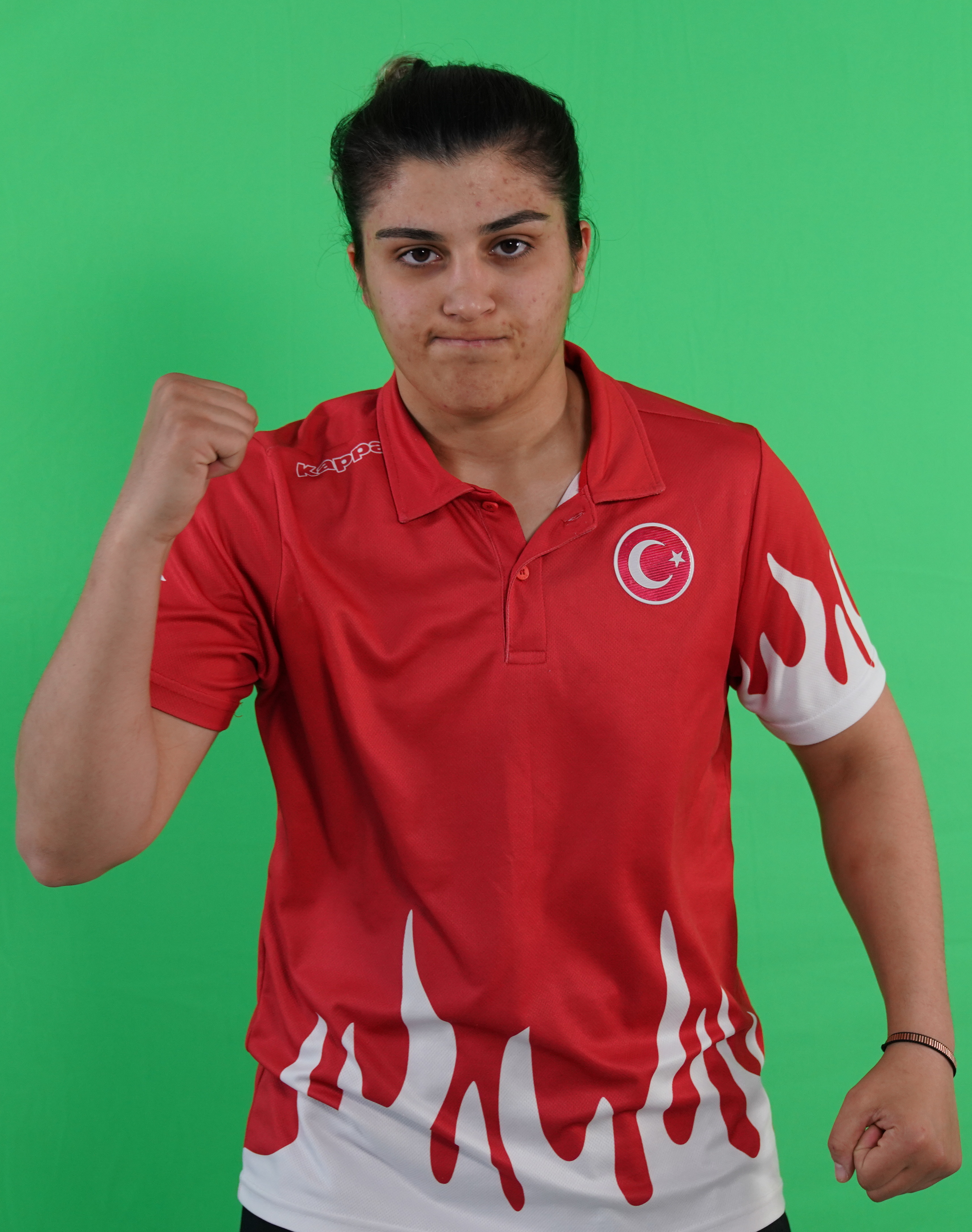
Busenaz Sürmeneli.

- Hatice Akbaş (born 2002), world (2022), European (2026), Mediterranean Games (2022) champion
- Ayşe Çağırır (born 1995), world (2022) champion
- Buse Naz Çakıroğlu (born 1996), world (2022) and European (2019, 2022, 2024) champion
- Nurcan Çarkçı, European (2003)champion
- Şennur Demir, (born 1982) world (2022) and European Union (2017) champion
- Hasibe Erkoç, world (2006) and European (2001, 2006) champion
- Elif Güneri (born 1987), European (2016, 2019) and European Union (2017) champion
- Nurhayat Hiçyakmazer (born 1983), world (2010) and European (2010) champion
- Sümeyra Kaya, European (2007), European Union (2006, 2008) champion
- Havvanur Kethüda (born 2007), European (2026) champion
- Nagehan Malkoç (born 1985), European Union (2007) champion
- Busenaz Sürmeneli (born 1998), Olympics (2020), world (2019, 2022, 2025), European (2024, 2026), European Games (2023), Mediterranean Games (2022) champion
- Hülya Şahin (born 1974), world (1996, 1998, 2001) and European (2001, 2003) champion
- Sabriye Şengül (born 1988)
- Ayşe Taş (born 1987), European Union (2010, 2011) champion
- Gülsüm Tatar (born 1985), world(2008, 2010), European Union (2006, 2007, 2008, 2010) and European (2004, 2009, 2011) champion
- Selma Yağcı (born 1981), European Union (2007, 2008) champion
- Şemsi Yaralı (born 1982), world (2008), European Union (2008) and European (2011) champion
- Serpil Yassıkaya, European Union (2010) champion

== Cycling ==
- Esra Kürkçü, Balkan champion
- Semra Yetiş, Balkan champion

== Darts ==
- Zehra Gemi (born 2009), world (2025 girls') champion

== Fencing ==
Épée

- Lal Erman, Islamic Solidarity Games (2021) champion
- Aleyna Ertürk, Islamic Solidarity Games (2021)
- Gökçe Günaç, Islamic Solidarity Games (2021) champion
- Damlanur Sönmüş, Islamic Solidarity Games (2021) champion

Foil

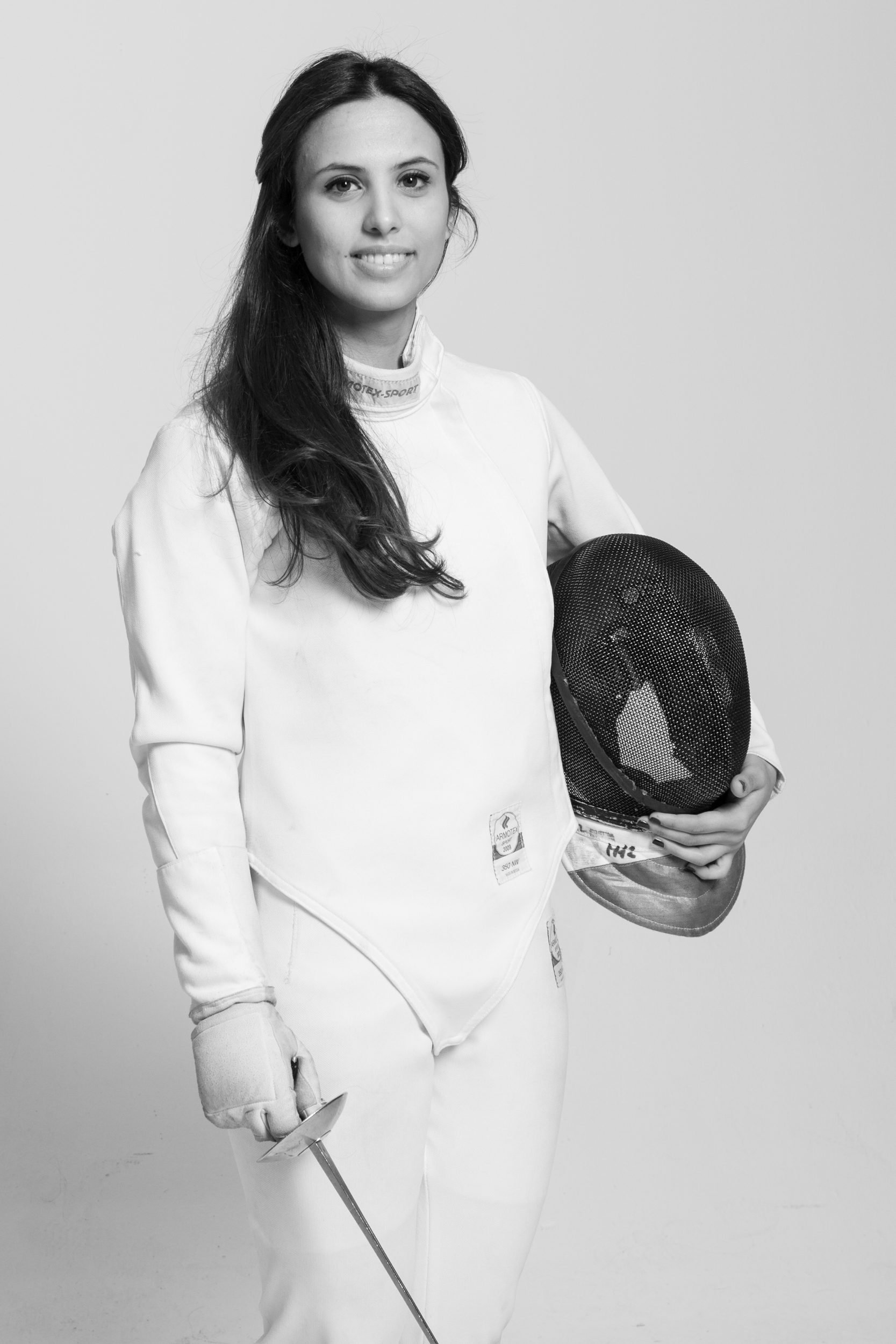
İrem Karamete.

- Suat Aşani (born 22 September 1916, date of death unknown)
- Halet Çambel (1916–2014), 1936 Olympian
- Almila Birçe Durukan, Islamic Solidarity Games (2021)
- Aleyna Ertürk (born 2005), Islamic Solidarity Games (2021, 2025) champion
- Özden Ezinler (born 1950)
- Firuze Ayşen Güneş, Islamic Solidarity Games (2021) champion
- Alisa İşbir, Islamic Solidarity Games (2021) champion
- İrem Karamete (born 1993), Islamic Solidarity Games (2021) champion

Sabre

- Nisanur Erbil (born 2003), Olympian fencer (2024)
- Iryna Shchukla Çiçek (born 1995), Islamic Solidarity Games (2021) champion

== Football ==
Women's football in Turkey began with the establishment of the all-women's club Dostlukspor in Istanbul in the early 1970s. Turkey women's national football team was established in 1995.

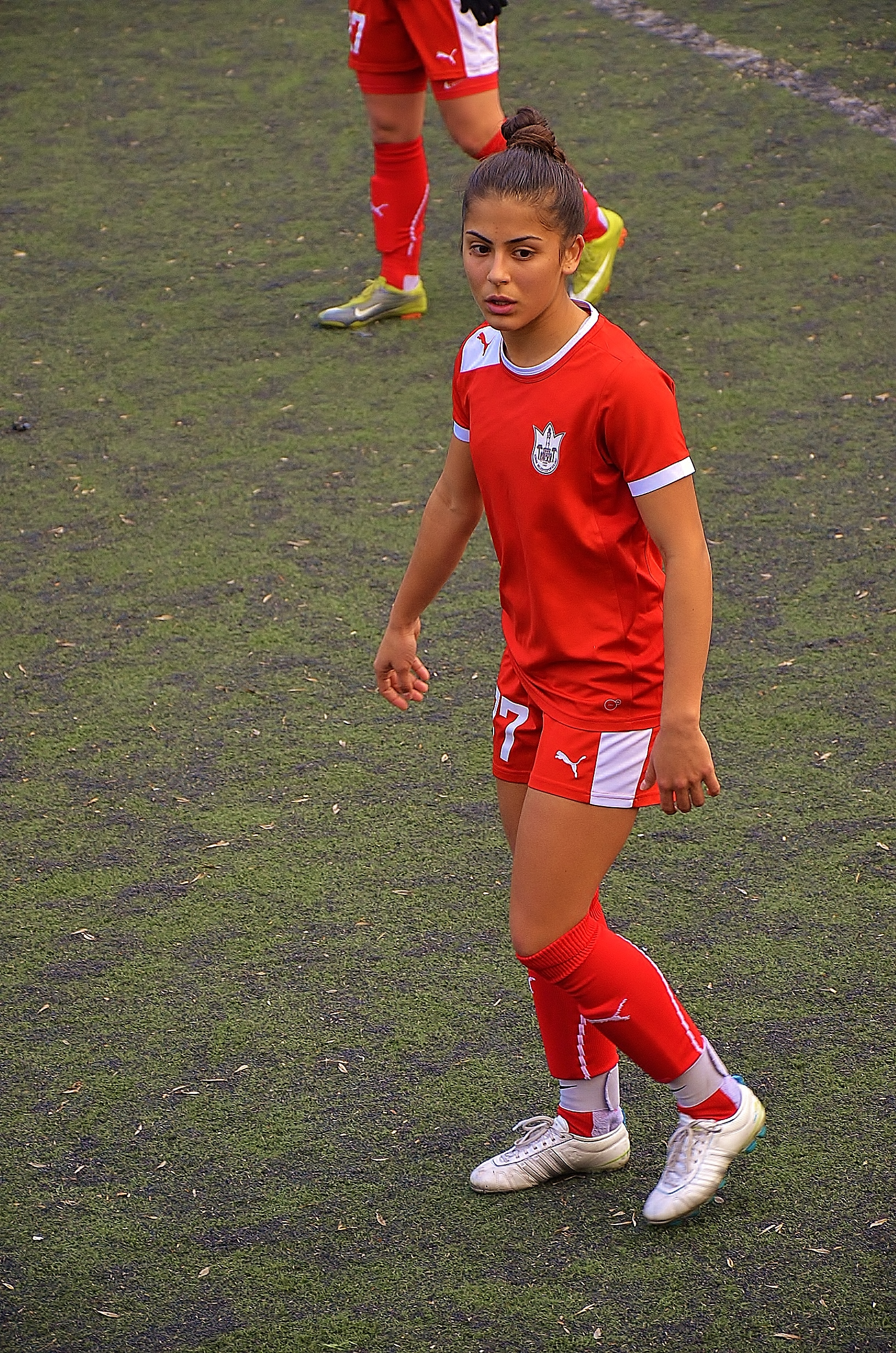
Sevgi Çınar, from Konak Belediyespor.

Notable footballers

- Merve Aladağ (born 1993)
- Sevgi Çınar (born 1994)
- Bilgin Defterli (born 1980)
- Sibel Duman (born 1990)
- Eylül Elgalp (born 1991)
- Esra Erol (born 1985)
- Melahat Eryurt (born 1975)
- Leyla Güngör (born 1993)
- Başak İçinözbebek (born 1994)
- Lale Orta (born 1960)
- Hatice Bahar Özgüvenç (born 1984)
- Zeliha Şimşek (born 1981)
- Ebru Topçu (born 1996)
- Yağmur Uraz (born 1990)
- Cansu Yağ (born 1990)
- Aylin Yaren (born 1989)

Managers

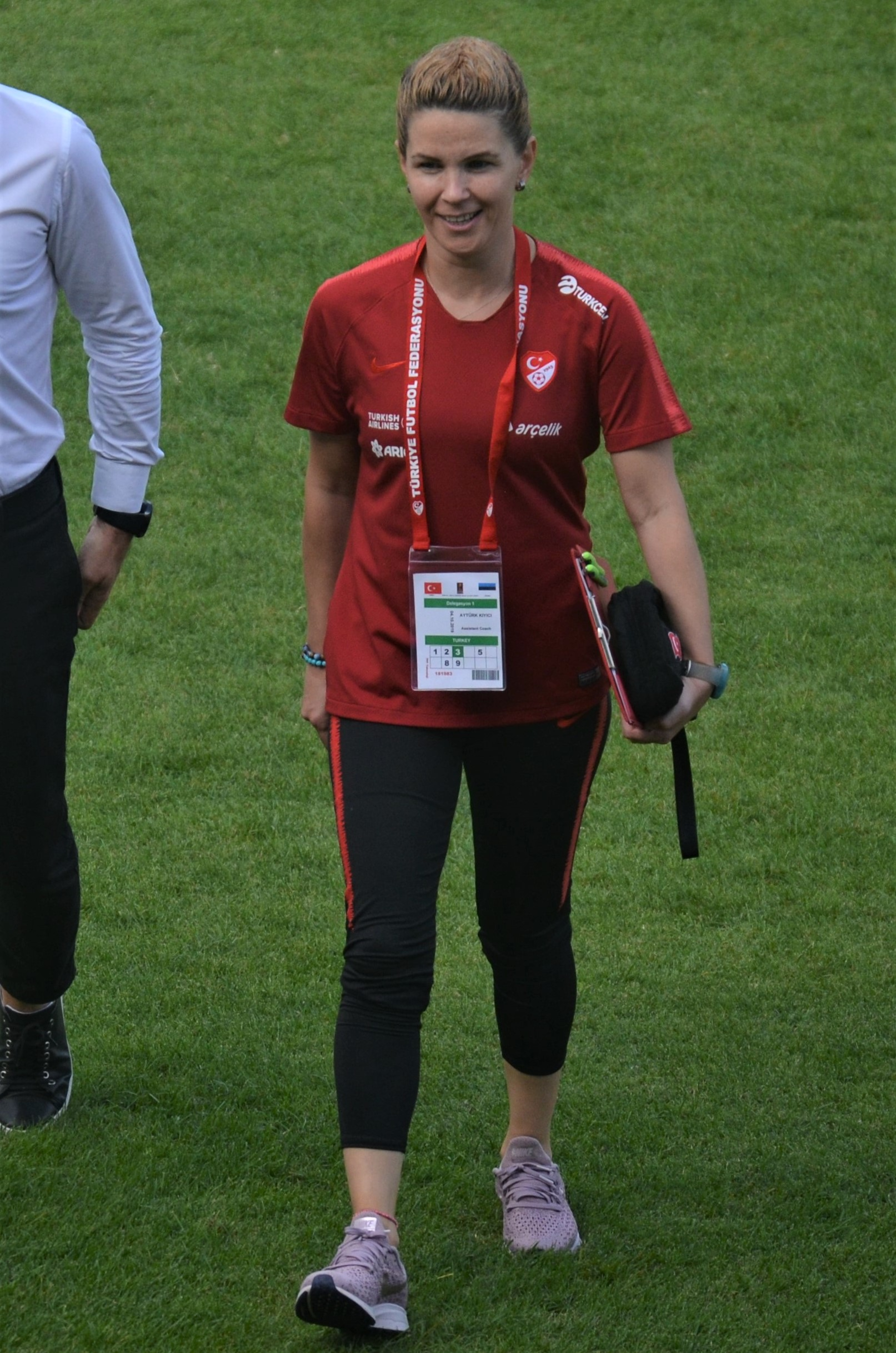
Aytürk Kıyıcı, manager of the Turkey women's national team.

- Özlem Araç (born 1989)
- Cemile Timur (born 1988)

Referees

- Necla Akdoğan (born 1971)
- Drahşan Arda (born 1945), world's first female referee
- Leman Bozacıoğlu
- İpek Emiroğlu (born 1992)
- Elif Köroğlu
- Mürvet Yavuztürk (born 1985)

FIFA listed refereesː

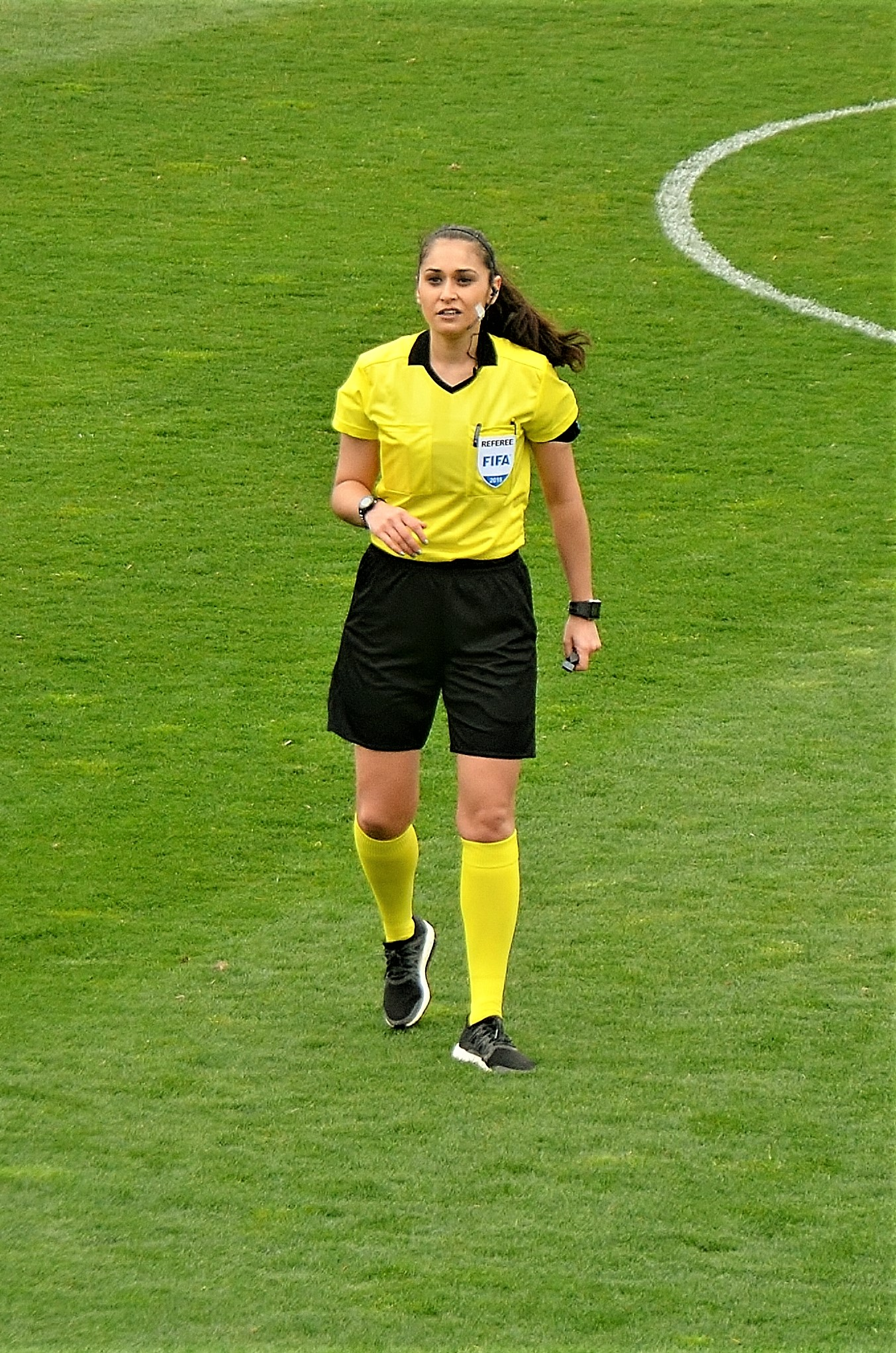
Neslihan Muratdağı; FIFA listed referee.

- Hilal Tuba Tosun Ayer (born 1970)
- Gamze Durmuş Pakkan (born 1993)
- Dilan Deniz Gökçek (born 1976)
- Kadriye Gökçek
- Dilek Koçbay (born 1982)
- Sibel Kolçak (born 1990)
- Neslihan Muratdağı (born 1988)
- Lale Orta (born 1960)
- Melis Özçiğdem (born 1982)
- Fatma Özlem Tursun (born 1988)
- Yeliz Topaloğlu (born 1978)
- Betül Nur Yılmaz

== Freediving ==
- Derya Can Göçen (born 1979), world record holder
- Yasemin Dalkılıç (born 1979), world record holder
- Şahika Ercümen (born 1985), world record holder
- Birgül Erken (born 1972)
- Fatma Uruk (born 1988), world champion and world record holder

== Gymnastics ==
=== Aerobic gymnastics ===
- Ayşe Begüm Onbaşı (born 2001), World (2021), Mediterranean Games (2021) and Islamic solidarity Games (2021) Championships

=== Artistic gymnastics ===
- Sevgi Seda Kayışoğlu (born 2005), Islamic Solidarity Games (2021) champion
- Bilge Tarhan (born 2004), Islamic Solidarity Games (2021) champion
- Göksu Üçtaş (born 1990), Islamic Solidarity Games (2017) champion
- Bengisu Yıldız (born 2006), Islamic Solidarity Games (2021) champion
- Tutya Yılmaz (born 1999), 2016 Olympian

=== Rhythmic gymnastics ===
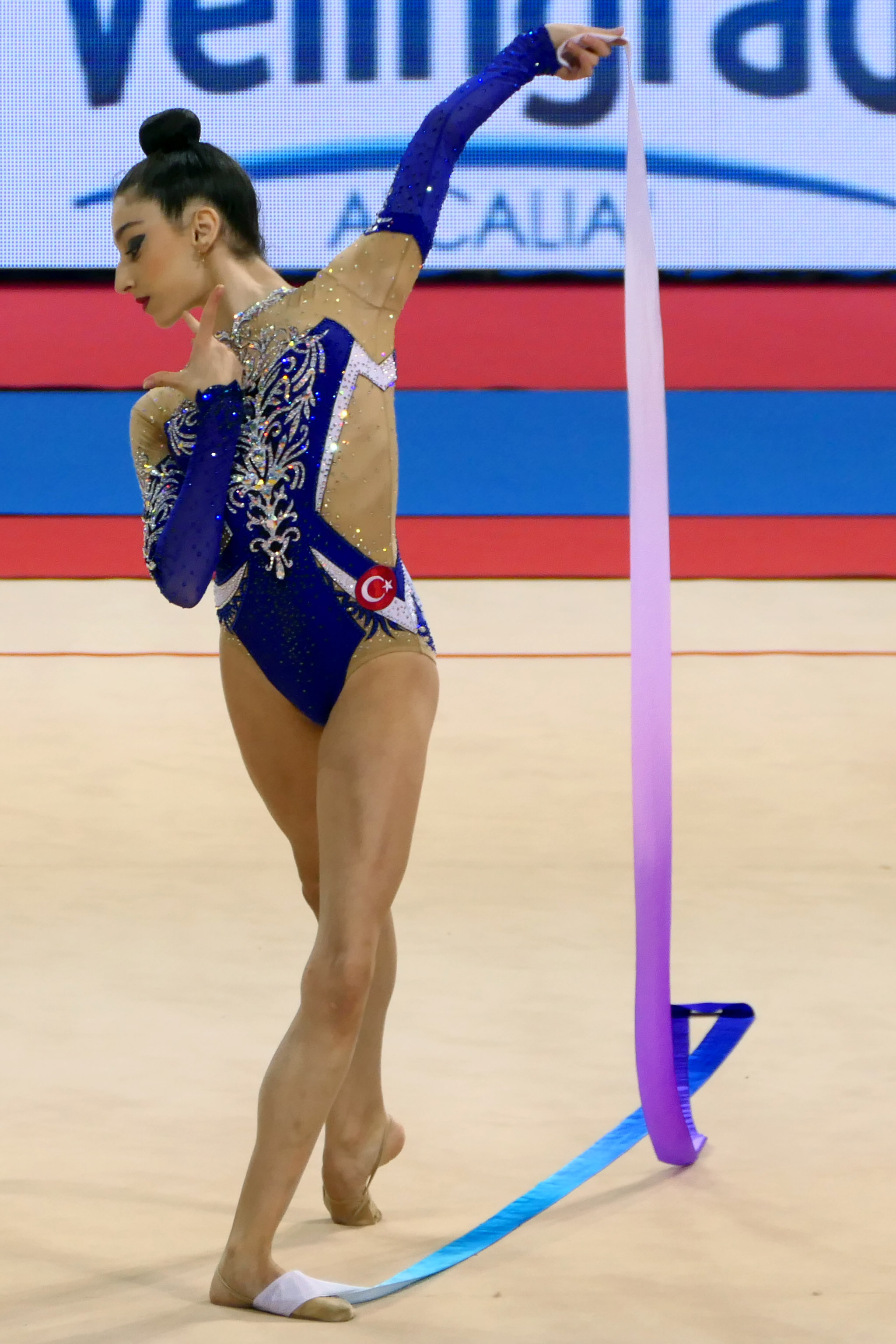
Hatice Gokce Emir

- Duygu Doğan (born 2000), European gold medalist in the 3 Hook + 4 clubs event
- Hatice Gokce Emir (born2008) Mediterranean Games (2026) champion

== Handball ==
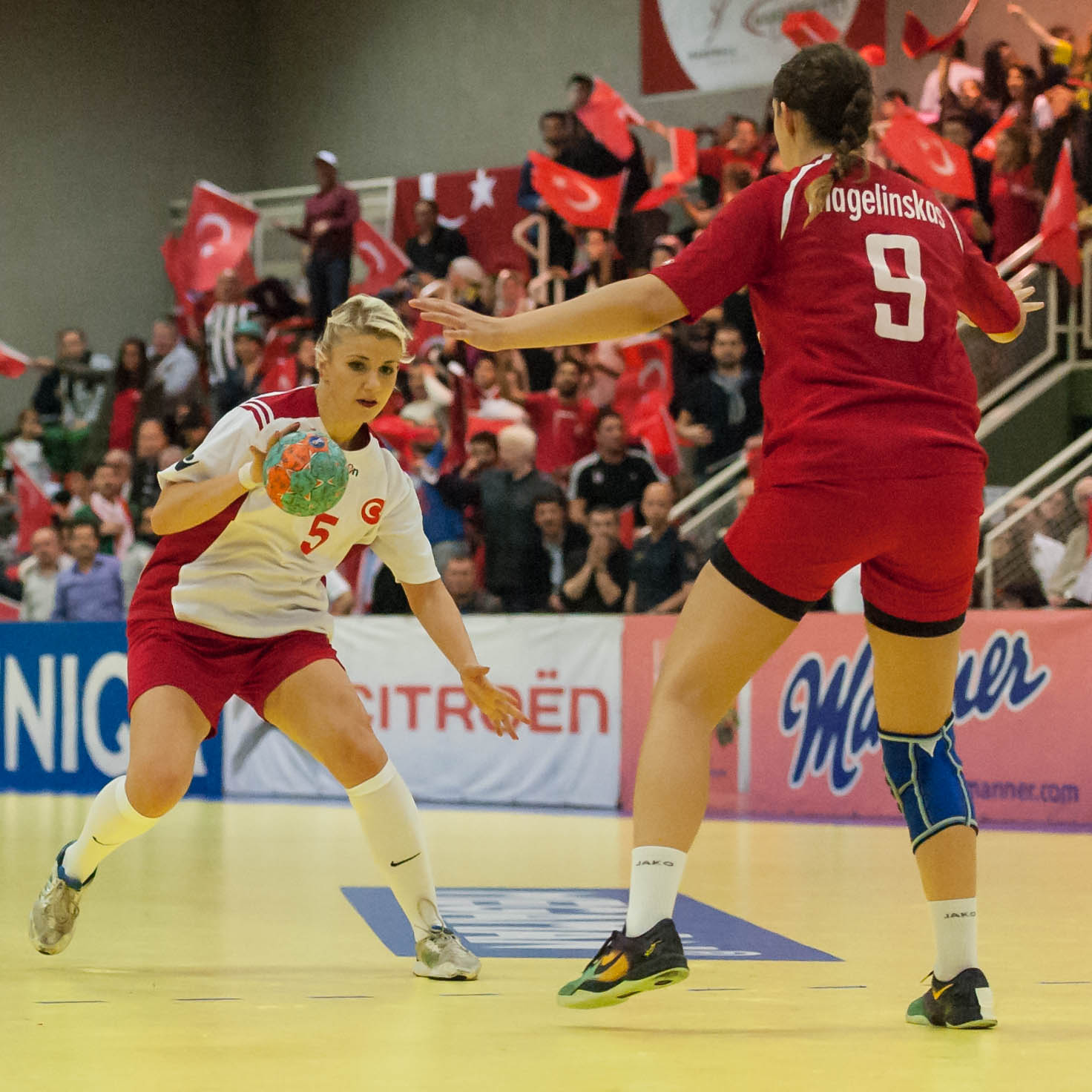
[Perihan Topaloğlu

(white) at the 2015 World Women's Handball Championship European qualification match]]

The Turkish Women's Handball League was established in 1978.

In the Mediterranean Games

Year	City	Rank
2009 Mediterranean Games	Pescara, Italy	Silver

- Tuana Akman, Islamic Solidarity Games (2021) champion
- Elif Sıla Ayfın (born 1996), Islamic Solidarity Games (2021) champion
- Neslihan Çalışkan, Islamic Solidarity Games (2021) champion
- Ceren Demirçelen, Islamic Solidarity Games (2021) champion
- Meryem Erdoğan, Islamic Solidarity Games (2021) champion
- Emine Gökdemir, Islamic Solidarity Games (2021) champion
- Nurceren Akgün Göktepe, Islamic Solidarity Games (2021) champion
- Atiye Gülseven, Islamic Solidarity Games (2021) champion
- Halime İslamoğlu, Islamic Solidarity Games (2021) champion
- Beyza Karaçam, Islamic Solidarity Games (2021) champion
- Merve Özbolluk (born 1994), Islamic Solidarity Games (2021) champion
- Bile Nur Öztürk, Islamic Solidarity Games (2021) champion
- Kübra Sarıkaya, Islamic Solidarity Games (2021) champion
- Ayşenur Sormaz, Islamic Solidarity Games (2021) champion
- Yasemin Şahin (born 1988), Islamic Solidarity Games (2021) champion
- Gülcan Tügel, Islamic Solidarity Games (2021) champion
- Betül Yılmaz (born 1988), Islamic Solidarity Games (2021) champion

== Ice hockey ==
Turkish national women's ice hockey team was established in 2006.

== Ice skating ==
- Naz Arıcı (born 1982), adult figure skater

== Judo ==
- Tuğçe Beder, Islamic Solidarity Games (2021) champion
- Hasret Bozkurt (born 2001), Islamic Solidarity Games (2025) champion
- Tuana Gülenay (born 2007), Mediterranean Games (20260 Champion
- Belkıs Zehra Kaya (born 1984), Mediterranean Games champion (2005)
- Kayra Sayit (born 1988), European (2016, 2021), Mediterranean Games (2018, 2022) and Islamic Solidarity Games (2021) champion
- Neşe Şensoy (born 1974), Mediterranean Games champion (2001)
- Nurcan Yılmaz, Islamic Solidarity Games (2021) champion

== Karate ==
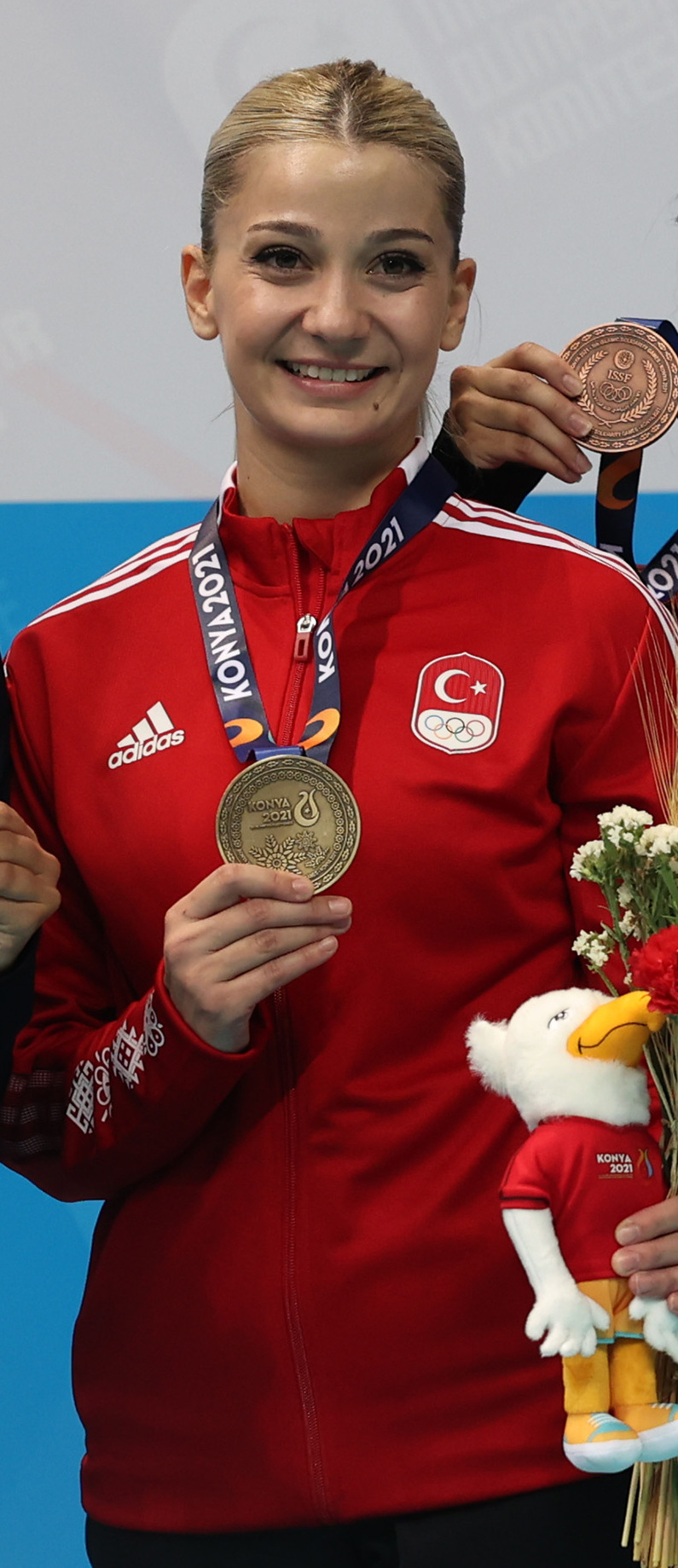
Dilara Bozan at the 2021 Islamic Solidarity Games.

- Dilara Bozan (born 1997), Islamic Solidarity Gamrs (2017, 2021), European (2015, 2024) champion
- Eda Eltemur (born 1999), European champion
- Serap Özçelik (born 1988), European champion
- Tuba Yakan (born 1991), Islamic Solidarity Gamrs (2021) champion

== Kickboxing ==
- Emine Arslan, Islamic Solidarity Gamrs (2021) champion
- Feyzanur Azizoğlu, Islamic Solidarity Gamrs (2021) champion
- Gözde Nur Göktaş, Islamic Solidarity Gamrs (2021) champion
- Kübra Kocakuş, Islamic Solidarity Gamrs (2021) champion
- Bediha Taçyıldız, Islamic Solidarity Gamrs (2021) champion
- Hayriye Türksoy Hançer, Islamic Solidarity Gamrs (2021) champion

== Modern pentathlon ==
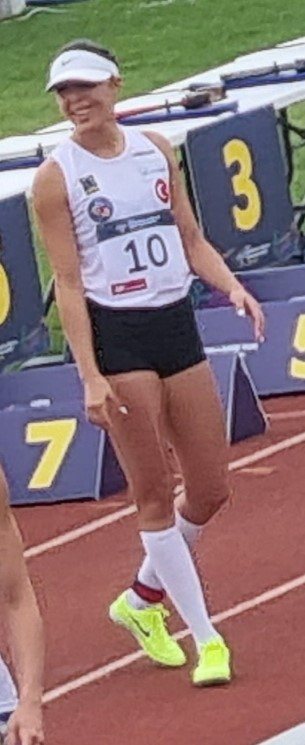
İlke Özyüksel at the 2023 World Modern Pentathlon Championships

- İlke Özyüksel (born 1997), first ever Turkish Olympian, European (2026) champion

== Motor sports ==
=== Car racing ===
- Seda Kaçan (born 1993), TCR European Endurance champion (2024)

=== Motorcycle racing ===
- Selen Tınaz (born 2008), motocross racer
- Irmak Yıldırım (born 2005), motocross racer

== Muaythai ==
- Halime Eke (bırn 1999), European champion (2024)
- Ezgi Keleş (born 2002), European champion (2024)
- Kübra Kocakuş (born 1996), world (2022, 2024), Islamic Solidarity Games (2021) champion
- Bediha Tacyıldız (born 1996), world (2014 2017, 2019, 2021, 2022), European (2012, 2014, 2019), Islamic Solidarity Games (2021) champion
- Gülistan Turan (born 1997), world (2023, 2024), European Games (2023), European (2024) champion

== Rowing ==
- Fitnat Özdil (1910–1993)
- Melek Özdil (1916– )
- Elis Özbay (2001– ), first Olympian
- Nezihe Özdil (1911–1984)
- Vecihe Taşçı (1905–2002)

== Sailing ==
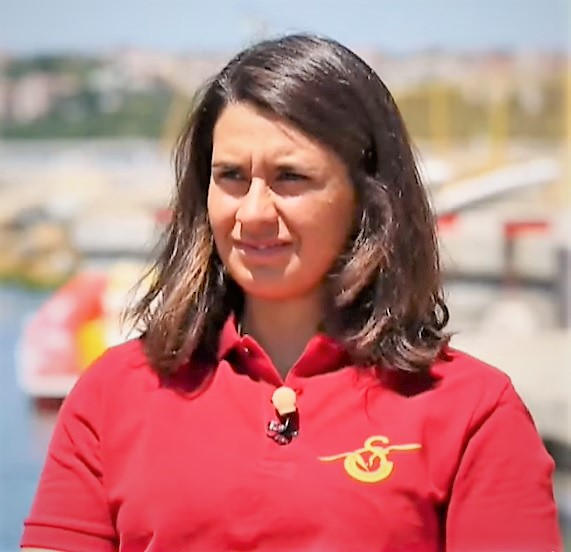
Ecem Güzel (2019)

Dinghy 470

- Beste Kaynakçı (born 1994), 2024 Olympian
- Lara Nalbantoğlu (born 2001), 2024 Olympian

IQFoil

- Merve Vatan (born 2005=, 2024 Olympian

Kitesurfing

- Derin Atakan (born 2006), 2024 Olympian

Laser Radial

- Ecem Güzel (born 1995), 2024 Olympian

Windsurfing

- Lena Erdil (born 1989), 2018 PWA World Cup Silver

== Shooting ==
Air pistol

- Elif Beyza Aşık (born 1994), European team record holder (2022)
- Esra Bozabalı (born 1991), European champion (2025)
- Şevval İlayda Tarhan (born 2000), European team record holder (2022), European champion (2025)
- Seher Tokmak (born 1999), European team record holder (2022)
- Şimal Yılmaz (born 2003), European silver medalist (2024), European chsmpion (2025)

Skeet

- Sena Can, Islamic Solidarity Games (2021) champion

Trap

- Safiye Sarıtürk Temizdemir (born 1995), Islamic Solidarity Games (2021), Mediterranean Games (2026) champion

== Swimming ==
Name	Competition	Host	Event	Rank
Melis Akarsu	2013 Islamic Solidarity Games	Palembang, Indonesia	200m butterfly	Bronze
Melis Akarsu	2013 Islamic Solidarity Games	Palembang, Indonesia	400m ind medley	Silver
Melis Akarsu	2013 Islamic Solidarity Games	Palembang, Indonesia	4 × 200 m free relay	Gold
Gizem Bozkurt	2013 Mediterranean Games	Mersin, Turkey	4 × 100 m free relay	Bronze
Gizem Bozkurt	2013 Islamic Solidarity Games	Palembang, Indonesia	100 m free	Silver
Gizem Bozkurt	2013 Islamic Solidarity Games	Palembang, Indonesia	200m ind medley	Gold
Gizem Bozkurt	2013 Islamic Solidarity Games	Palembang, Indonesia	4 × 100 m free relay	Gold
Gizem Bozkurt	2013 Islamic Solidarity Games	Palembang, Indonesia	4 × 200 m free relay	Gold
Gizem Bozkurt	2013 Islamic Solidarity Games	Palembang, Indonesia	4 × 100 m medley relay	Bronze
Ceren Dilek	2013 Islamic Solidarity Games	Palembang, Indonesia	4 × 100 m free relay	Gold
Ceren Dilek	2013 Islamic Solidarity Games	Palembang, Indonesia	4 × 100 m medley relay	Bronze
Burcu Dolunay	2013 Mediterranean Games	Mersin, Turkey	50m free	Bronze
Burcu Dolunay	2013 Mediterranean Games	Mersin, Turkey	4 × 100 m free relay	Bronze
Dilara Buse Gunaydin	2013 Mediterranean Games	Mersin, Turkey	50m breast	Silver
Dilara Buse Gunaydin	2013 Mediterranean Games	Mersin, Turkey	100m breast	Bronze
Esra Kübra Kaçmaz	2013 Mediterranean Games	Mersin, Turkey	4 × 100 m free relay	Bronze
Esra Kübra Kaçmaz	2013 Islamic Solidarity Games	Palembang, Indonesia	50m butterfly	Silver
Esra Kübra Kaçmaz	2013 Islamic Solidarity Games	Palembang, Indonesia	200m back	Gold
Esra Kübra Kaçmaz	2013 Islamic Solidarity Games	Palembang, Indonesia	100m butterfly	Silver
Esra Kübra Kaçmaz	2013 Islamic Solidarity Games	Palembang, Indonesia	4 × 200 m free relay	Gold
Esra Kübra Kaçmaz	2013 Islamic Solidarity Games	Palembang, Indonesia	4 × 100 m free relay	Gold
Ayşe Ezgi Yazıcı	2013 Islamic Solidarity Games	Palembang, Indonesia	50m butterfly	Bronze
Ayşe Ezgi Yazıcı	2013 Islamic Solidarity Games	Palembang, Indonesia	100m butterfly	Bronze
Ayşe Ezgi Yazıcı	2013 Islamic Solidarity Games	Palembang, Indonesia	4 × 100 m medley relay	Bronze
Halime Zülal Zeren	2013 Mediterranean Games	Mersin, Turkey	200m back	Bronze
Halime Zülal Zeren	2013 Mediterranean Games	Mersin, Turkey	4 × 100 m free relay	Bronze
Halime Zülal Zeren	2013 Islamic Solidarity Games	Palembang, Indonesia	200m free	Gold
Halime Zülal Zeren	2013 Islamic Solidarity Games	Palembang, Indonesia	50m back	Gold
Halime Zülal Zeren	2013 Islamic Solidarity Games	Palembang, Indonesia	200m back	Gold
Halime Zülal Zeren	2013 Islamic Solidarity Games	Palembang, Indonesia	4 × 100 m free relay	Gold
Halime Zülal Zeren	2013 Islamic Solidarity Games	Palembang, Indonesia	4 × 200 m free relay	Gold
Halime Zülal Zeren	2013 Islamic Solidarity Games	Palembang, Indonesia	4 × 100 m medley relay	Bronze

- Ekaterina Avramova (born 1991), Islamic Solidarity Games (2021) champion
- Beril Böcekler (born 2004), Islamic Solidarity Games (2021) champion
- İlknur Nihan Çakıcı, Islamic Solidarity Games (2021) champion
- Ecem Dönmez, Islamic Solidarity Games (2021) champion
- Sezin Eligül, Islamic Solidarity Games (2021) champion
- Deniz Ertan (born 2004), Mediterranean Games (2022) and Islamic Solidarity Games (2021) champion
- Viktoriya Zeynep Güneş (born 1998), European (2021), Mediterranean Games (2022) and Islamic Solidarity Games (2021) champion
- Defne Taçyıldız (born 2003), Islamic Solidarity Games (2021) champion
- Merve Tuncel (born 2005), Mediterranean Games (2022) and Islamic Solidarity Games (2021) champion

Open water swimming

- Bengisu Avcı (born 1996), holder of Triple Crown of Open Water Swimming and Oceans Seven
- Nilay Erkal (born 1999)
- Melda Fatma İdrisoğlu (born 1989)
- Aysu Türkoğlu (born 2000), competes in the Oceans Seven

== Table tennis ==
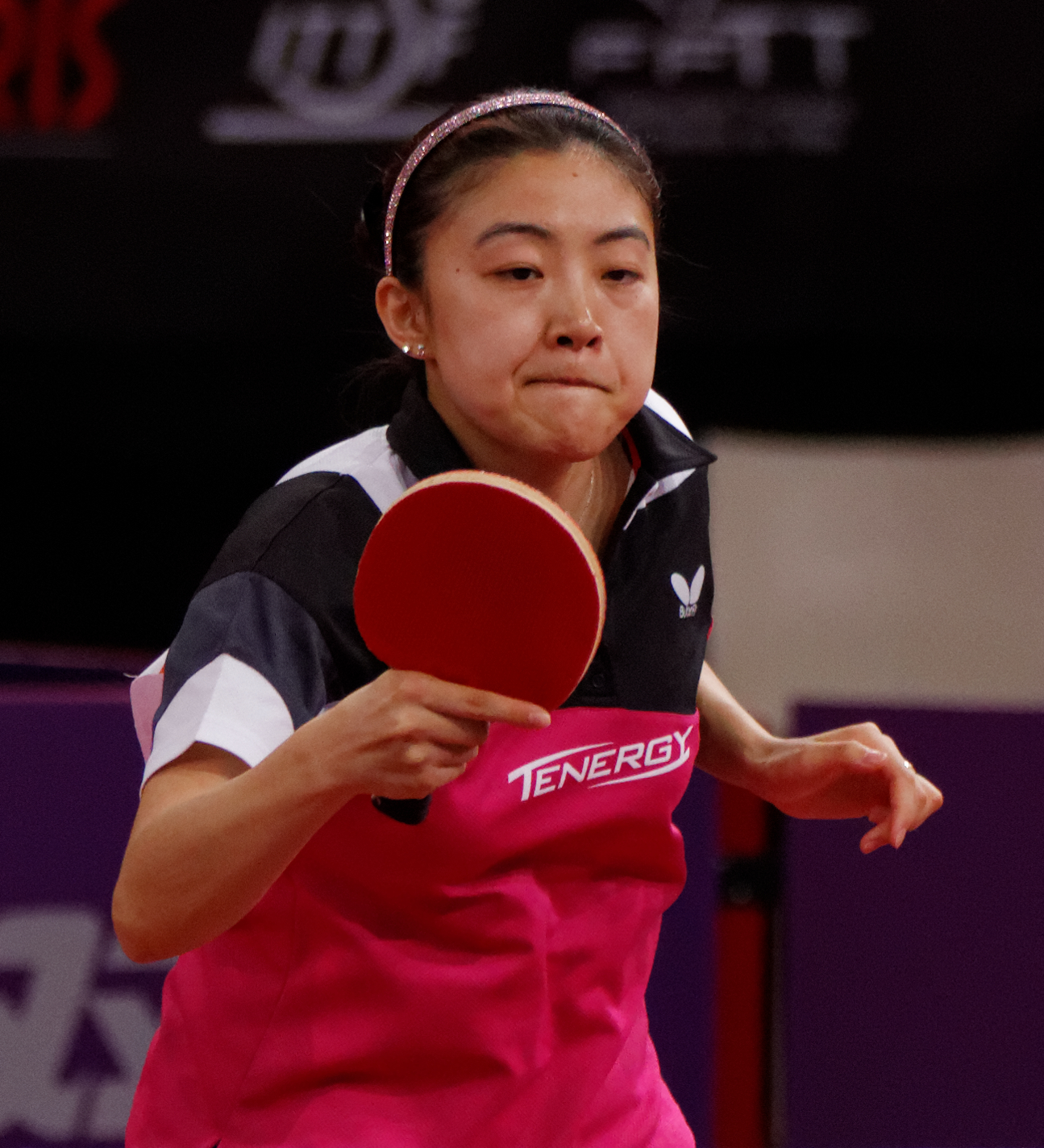
Melek Hu, table tannis player.

- Ece Haraç (born 2002), Mediterranean Games (2026) in mixed team, champion

Olympian

- Meral Yıldız Ali (born 1987)
- Sibel Altınkaya, 2024 Olympian
- Melek Hu (born 1989)
- Özge Yılmaz, Islamic Solidarity Games champion (2021)

== Taekwondo ==
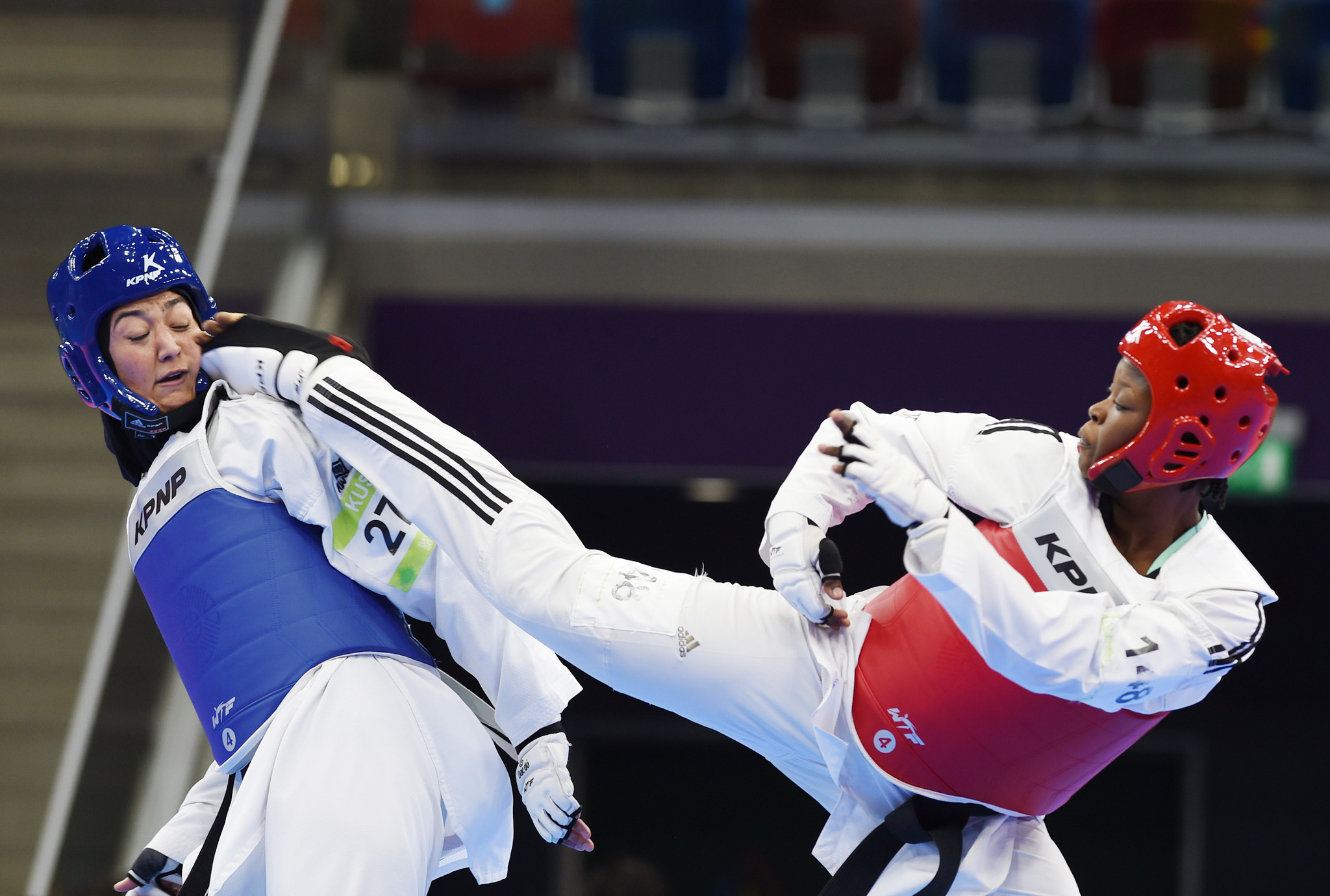
Nafia Kuş (blue).

- Zeliha Ağrıs (born 1998), world and European champion
- Elif Sude Akgül (born 2006), Mediterranean Games (2026) champion
- Dürdane Altunel
- Furkan Asena Aydın, world and European champion
- Arzu Ceylan, European champion
- Nuray Deliktaş, European champion
- Merve Dinçel (born 1999), world (2023, 2025), European (2022, 2026), Mediterranean Games (2022) and World (2023) champion
- Ayşegül Ergin, 1992 Olympian
- Yeliz Fındık, European champion
- Emine Göğebakan (born 2001), world (2025)
- Sibel Güler, 2008 Olympian, European champion
- Hatice Kübra İlgün (born 1993), European (2022), Mediterranean Games (2022, 2026) champion
- Nafia Kuş (born 1995), world (2023, 2025), European (2018) European Games (2023), Mediterranean Games (2022) and Islamic Solidarity Games (2017) champion
- Zeynep Murat, European champion
- Burcu Sallakoğlu
- Kadriye Selimoğlu, world champion
- Arzu Tan, world champion
- Azize Tanrıkulu, 2008 Olympian, European champion
- Ayşenur Taşbakan, European champion
- Nur Tatar, 2012 Olympian, world and European champion
- Hamide Bıkçın Tosun, 2000 Olympian, world champion
- Sude Yaren Uzunçavdar (born 2005), Islamic Solidarity Games (2021), Mediterranean Games (2026) champion
- İrem Yaman, world champion
- Hatice Kübra Yangın, European champion
- Tennur Yerlisu, world and European champion
- Gülnur Yerlisu, European champion
- Rukiye Yıldırım (born 1991), European (2010, 2018), Mediterranean Games (2018) and Islamic Solidarity Games (2017, 2021) champion
- Işıl Zafer (born 2004), Mediterranean Games (2026) champion

== Tennis ==
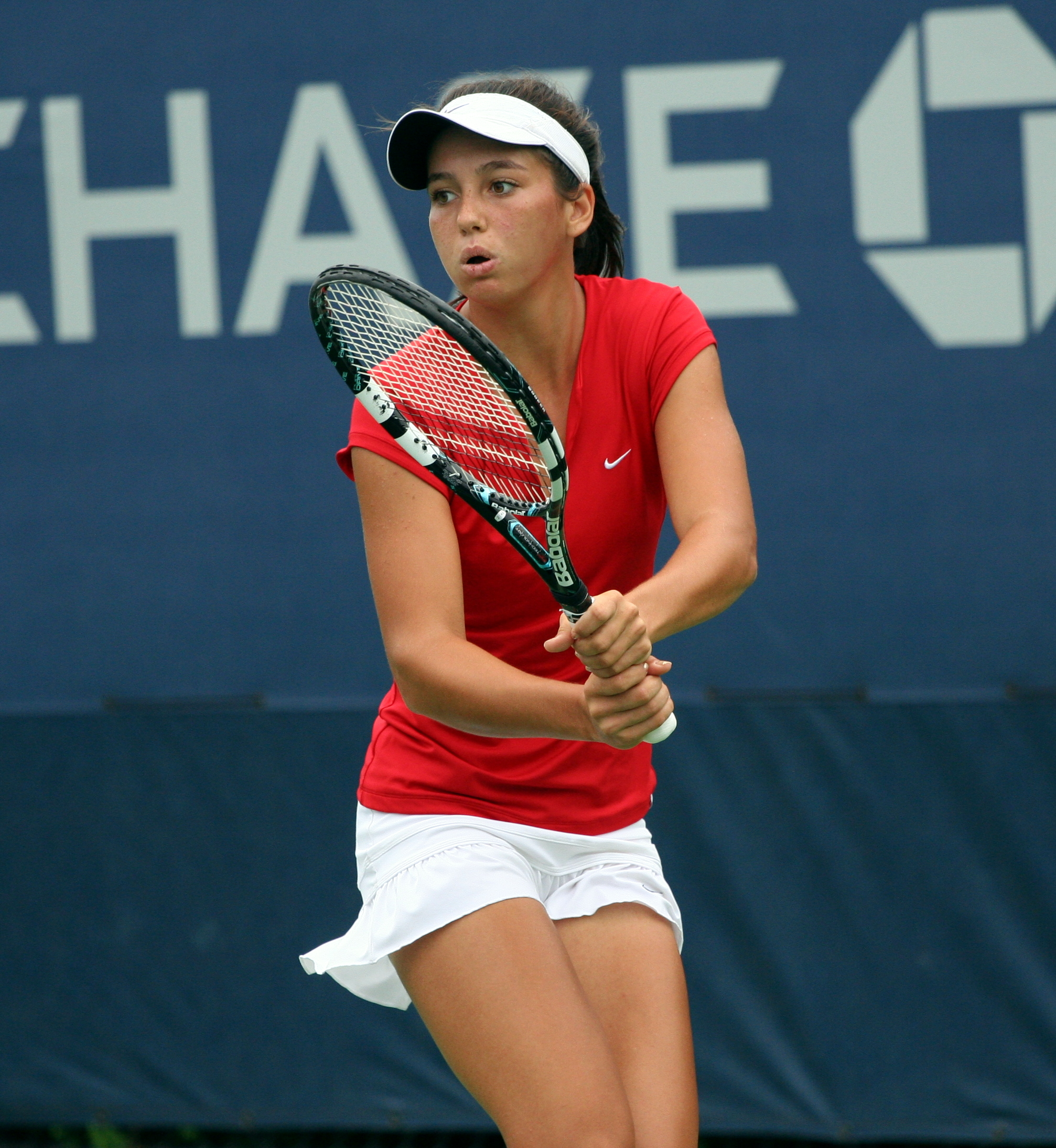
İpek Soylu at the 2012 US Open.

Some notable Turkish female tennis players include:

- Çağla Büyükakçay, former WTA tour champion
- Başak Eraydın
- Pemra Özgen
- İpek Soylu
- Zeynep Sönmez (born 2002), WTA tour champion
- İpek Şenoğlu
- Melis Sezer
- Vecihe Taşçı (1905–2002)

== Volleyball ==
=== National teams ===
The Turkish Women's National Team is also known as "Filenin Sultanları" (Sultans of the Net).

Year	City	Rank
1975 Mediterranean Games	Algiers, Algeria	Bronze
1987 Mediterranean Games	Latakia, Syria	Silver
1991 Mediterranean Games	Athens, Greece	Silver
1993 Mediterranean Games	Languedoc-Roussillon, France	Bronze
1997 Mediterranean Games	Bari, Italy	Silver
2001 Mediterranean Games	Tunis, Tunisia	Silver
2003 Women's European Volleyball Championship	Ankara, Turkey	Silver
2005 Mediterranean Games	Almeria, Spain	Gold
2009 Women's European Volleyball League	Kayseri, Turkey	Silver
2009 Mediterranean Games	Pescara, Italy	Silver
2010 Women's European Volleyball League	Ankara, Turkey	Bronze
2011 Women's European Volleyball League	Istanbul, Turkey	Silver
2011 Women's European Volleyball Championship	Italy and Serbia	Bronze
2012 FIVB Volleyball World Grand Prix,	Ningbo, China	Bronze
2013 Mediterranean Games	Mersin, Turkey	Silver
2014 Women's European Volleyball League		Gold
2015 European Games Women's Volleyball		Silver
2015 Women's European Volleyball League		Silver
2017 Women's European Volleyball Championship	Azerbaijan, Georgia	Bronze
2018 FIVB Volleyball Women's Nations League	Nanjing, Chna	Silver
2018 Mediterranean Games	Tarragona, Spain	Bronze
2019 Women's European Volleyball Championship	Hungary, Poland, Slovakia, Turkey	Silver
2021 Women's European Volleyball Championship	Serbia, Bulgaria, Croatia, Romania	Bronze
2021 FIVB Volleyball Women's Nations League	Rimini, Italy	Bronze
2023 FIVB Volleyball Women's Nations League	Arlington, TX, United States	Gold
2023 Women's European Volleyball Championship	Belgium, Estonia, Germany, Italy	Gold

| 2025 Dünya Kadınlar Voleybol Şampiyonası ||Tayland, || Silver

=== Club teams ===
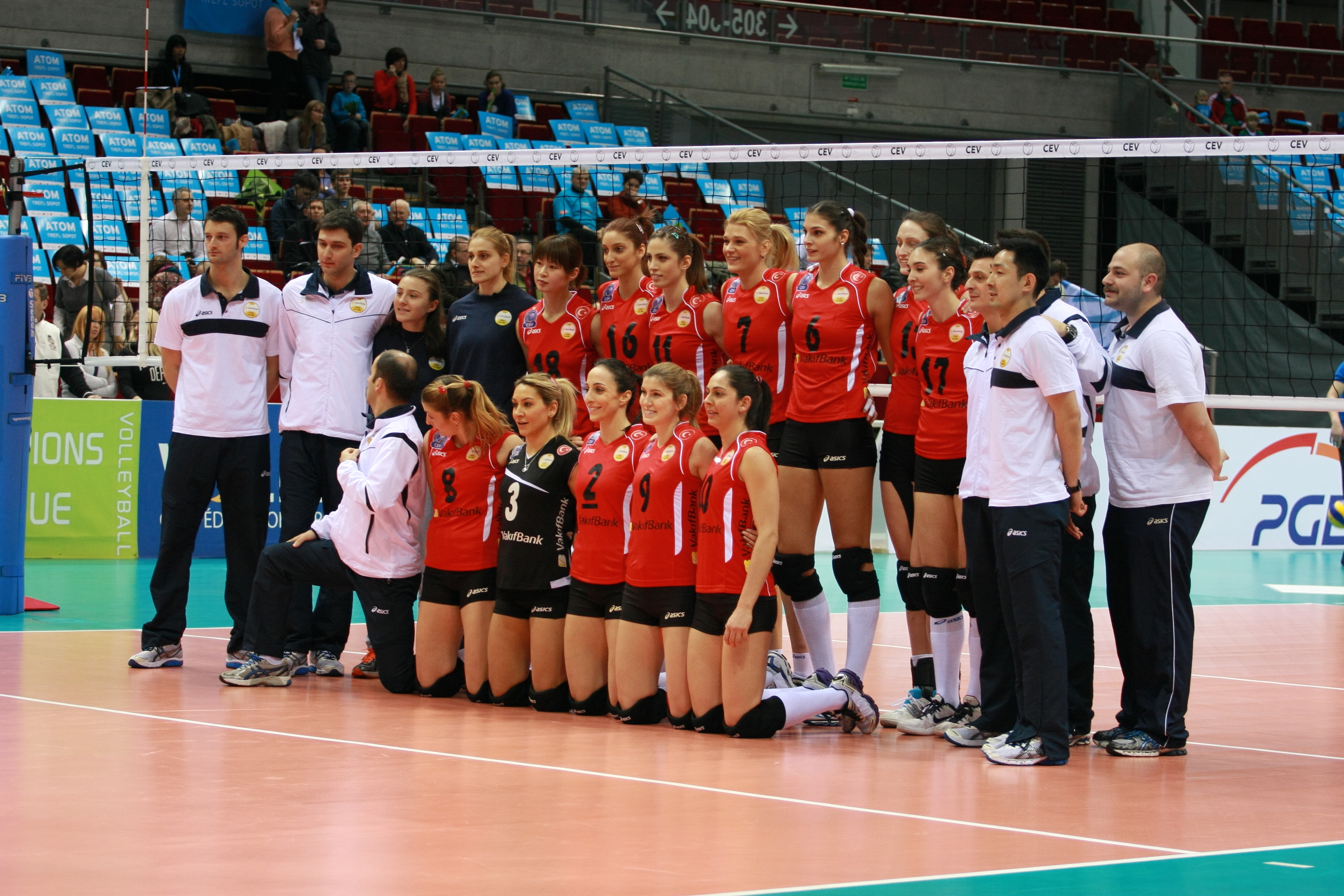
VakıfBank, Istanbul.

Fenerbahçe won the 2011–12 CEV Women's Champions League. Vakıfbank is the winner of the 2013 Club World Championship and the 2012–13 CEV Champions League. Bursa Büyükşehir Belediyespor won the 2014–15 CEV Women's Challenge Cup.

- Ezgi Akyaldız, Islamic Solidarity Games (2021) champion
- Ayçin Akyol, Islamic Solidarity Games (2021) champion
- Emine Arıcı, Islamic Solidarity Games (2021) champion
- İlkin Aydın (born 2000), Islamic Solidarity Games (2021) champion
- Zeynep Sude Demirel (born 2000), Islamic Solidarity Games (2021) champion
- Yaprak Erkek, Islamic Solidarity Games (2021) champion
- Buket Gülübay, Islamic Solidarity Games (2021) champion
- İdil Naz Kanbur, Islamic Solidarity Games (2021) champion
- Ceren Kapucu (born 1993), Islamic Solidarity Games (2021) champion
- Buse Kayacan Sonsırma, Islamic Solidarity Games (2021) champion
- Aslıhan Kılıç (born 1998), Islamic Solidarity Games (2021) champion
- Yasemin Yıldırım, Islamic Solidarity Games (2021) champion
- Melis Yılmaz (born 1997), Islamic Solidarity Games (2021) champion
- Tutku Burcu Yüzgenç, Islamic Solidarity Games (2021) champion

== Water polo ==
National team players:

- Reyhan Acar
- Dilara Buralı
- Melek Cavlak
- Asli Duman
- Damla Deniz Düz
- Yagmur Arzu Elma
- Yonca Sevval Erdem
- Melda Fatma Idrisoğlu
- Karya Kose
- Kübra Kuş
- Fatma Eser Özaydın
- Pelin Ozdemir
- Aylin Soylemez

== Weightlifting ==
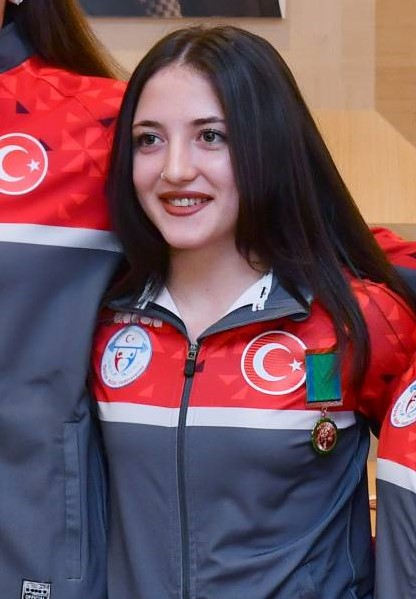
Cansu bektaş (2023)

- Derya Açıkgöz (born 1977), European (1997) champşon
- Duygu Alıcı (born 2001), Islamic Solidarity Games (2021) champion
- Cansu Bektaş (born 2003), European (2023, 2024) champion
- Emine Bilgin (born 1984), European (2001) champion
- Fatmagül Çevik (born 2005) national record holder ın the snatch event (2024)
- Ayşegül Çoban (born 1992), European (2014) champion
- Aylin Daşdelen (born 1982), European (2002, 2003, 2010, 2011) champion
- Nuray Güngör (born 2000), Islamic Solidarity Games (2021) champion
- Şaziye Erdoğan (born 1992), world (2019), European (2019, 2022), Mediterranean Games (2018) champion
- Dilara Narin (born 2002), Islamic Solidarity Games (2021) champion
- Aysel Özkan (born 2002), Islamic Solidarity Games (2021) champion
- Sibel Özkan (born 1988), world (2010), European (2015, 2016) champion
- Şule Şahbaz (born 1978), European (2002) champion
- Sibel Şimşek (born 1984), European (2004, 2009, 2010, 2012) champion
- Nurcan Taylan (born 1983), Olympic (2004), European (2003, 2004, 2008), Mediterranean Games (2005) champion
- Dilara Uçan (born 2002), Islamic Solidarity Games (2021) champion

== Wrestling ==
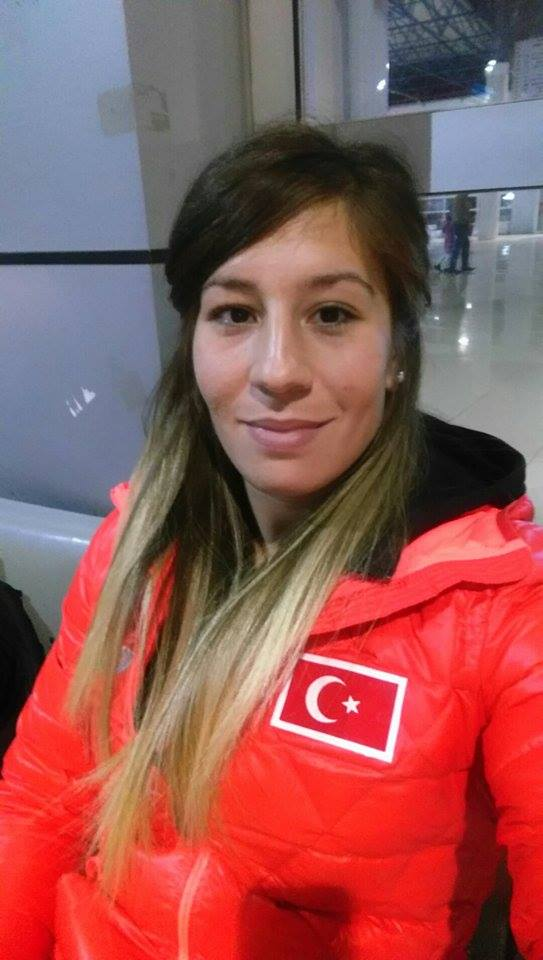
100pxYasemin Adar (2016)

- Yasemin Adar (born 1991), world (2017, 2022), European (2016, 2017, 2018, 2019, 2022ü 2023, 2024), Islamic Solidarity Games (2017) and Mediterranean Games (2013, 2022) champion
- Nesrin Baş (born 2002), European (2024, 2026)tmn champion
- Evin Demirhan (born 1995), European champion (2022), Mediterranean Games (2018, 2022) champion
- Zehra Demirhan (born 2001), Mediterranean Games (2026) champion
- Bediha Gün (born 1994), Mediterranean Games (2018, 2022) champion
- Elvira Süleyman Kamaloğlu (born 2001), Mediterranean Games (2026) champion
- Buse Tosun (born 1995), Mediterranean Games (2018), Islamic Solidarity Games (2021), world (2023 and European (2024=) champion
- Zeynep Yetgil (born 2000), mediterranean Games (2026= champion

== Para Archery ==
- Handan Biroğlu (born 1981), para-archer
- Öznur Cüre (born 1997), Paralympics (2024), world (2022, 2023, 2025), Islamic Solidarity Games (2021), European (2023, 2024) champion
- Burcu Dağ (born 1981), world champion para-archer
- Gizem Girişmen (born 1981), Paralympic champion archer
- Merve Nur Eroğlu (born 1993), Islamic Solidarity Games (2021) champion
- Nil Mısır (born 1987), Islamic Solidarity Games (2021) champion
- Gülbin Su (born 1971), Paralympian archer
- Büşra Ün (born 1994), world (2025) champion

== Para Athletics ==
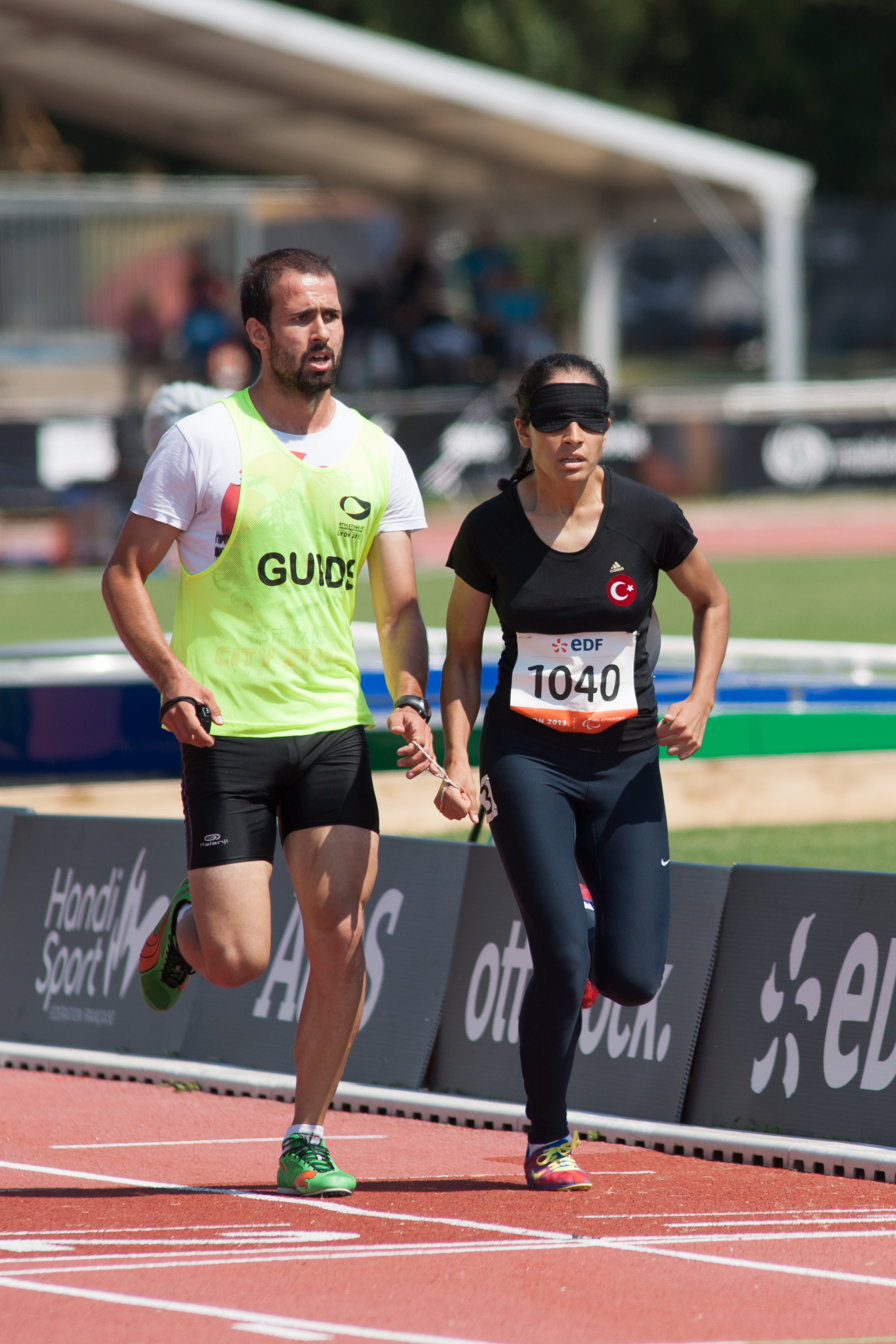
Sümeyye Özcan running with guide in a 1500m event.

- Fatma Damla Altın (born 2002), Paralympian long jumper, heptathlete, pentathlete world and European champion
- Esra Bayrak (born 1998), Paralympian long junper world and European champion
- Hamide Kurt (born 1993), Paralympian sprinter
- Sümeyye Özcan (born 1992), Paralympian middle-distance runner
- Zübeyde Süpürgeci (born 1993), sprinter, World Athletics European (2021), European (2016, 2018),

Mediterranean Games (2018) and Islamic Similarity Games (2021) champion

== Para Badminton ==
- Emine Seçkin (born 1980), Paralympian European champion
- Halime Yıldız (born 1980), European (2023) champion, 2024 Paralympian

== Goalball ==
- Sevda Altınoluk (born 1994), Paralympic gold medalist goalball player
- Buket Atalay (born 1990), Paralympic gold medalist goalball player
- Gülşah Düzgün (born 1995), Paralympic gold medalist goalball player
- Neşe Mercan (born 1994), Paralympic gold medalist goalball player
- Sümeyye Özcan (born 1992), Paralympic gold medalist goalball player
- Zeynep Yetgil, Islamic Soldiarity Games (2021) champion
- Seda Yıldız (born 1998), Paralympic gold medalist goalball player

== Para Judo ==
- Nazan Akın (born 1983), Paralympic medalist judoka
- ZeynepÇelik (born 1996), world and European champion judoka
- Duygu Çete (born 1989), Paralympic medalist judoka
- Mesme Taşbağ (born 1981), European champion, Paralympic medalist judoka
- Ecem Taşın (born 1991), Paralympic medalist judoka
- Döndü Yeşilyurt (born 1993), world and European champion judoka

== Powerlifting ==
- Özlem Becerikli (born 1980), Paralympic medalist powerlifter
- Çiğdem Dede (born 1980), Paralympic medalist powerlifter
- Nazmiye Muslu (born 1979), Paralympic and world champion powerlifter

== Para Shooting ==
- Çağla Baş (born 1992), wheelchair basketball player and Paralympic shooter
- Aysel Özgan (born 1978), sport shooter
- Ayşegül Pehlivanlar (born 1979), sport shooter

== Para Swimming ==
- Ada Zehra Anlatıcı (born 2007), European champion swimmer with Down syndrome
- Emine Avcu, Islamic Solidarity Games (2021) champion
- Sümeyye Boyacı (born 2003), Paralympian (2016), world champion (2022) and Islamic Soidarity Games champion (2021)
- Özlem Kaya (born 1992), Paralympian (2012, 2016)
- Şevval Beren Mutlu, Islamic Solidarity Games champion (2021)
- Sevilay Öztürk (born 2003), Paralympian (2016), Islamic Solidarity Games champion (2021)

== Para Table tennis ==
- Ebru Acer (born 2002), world (2025), European (2023) champion Paralympian
- Merve Cansu Demir, Islamic Solidarity Games (2021) champion
- Ümran Ertiş (born 1996), Paralympic medalist, European (2013) and Islamic Solidarity Games (2021) champion
- Neslihan Kavas (born 1987), Paralympic medalist, European (2013) and Islamic Solidarity Games (2021) champion
- Kübra Öçsoy (born 1994), Paralympic medalist, European champion
- Sümeyra Türk (born 1997), world doubles (2025) champion

== Para Taekwondo ==
- Meryem Betül Çavdar (born 2000), European champion
- Nurcihan Ekinci, European champion
- Seçil Er, world and European champion
- Gamze Gürdal, European (2022, 2024, 2026), European Para (2023) champion
- Merve Yazıcı, Deaflympics (2013, 2017, 2021), European Deaf (2019) champion

== Wheelchair tennis ==
- Büşra Ün (born 1994), first Paralympic competitor
