= Raina Ramdhani =

Indonesian swimmer (born 1995)

Personal information
- Full name: Raina Saumi Grahana Ramdhani
- Born: 24 October 1995 (age 30) Bandung, Indonesia

Sport
- Sport: Swimming
Medal record
Women's swimming
Islamic Solidarity Games
Silver medal – second place	2013 Palembang	1500 m freestyle
Bronze medal – third place	2013 Palembang	400 m freestyle
Bronze medal – third place	2013 Palembang	800 m freestyle
SEA Games
Bronze medal – third place	2011 Palembang	800m freestyle

Raina Saumi Grahana Ramdhani (born 24 October 1995) is an Indonesian swimmer. She competed in the women's 800 metre freestyle event at the 2017 World Aquatics Championships.
