= Burcu Dolunay =

Turkish swimmer (born 1984)

Personal information
- Nationality: Turkey
- Born: 17 February 1984 (age 42) İzmir, Turkey
- Height: 1.74 m (5 ft 9 in) (2012)
- Weight: 63 kg (139 lb) (2012)

Sport
- Sport: Swimming
- Strokes: Freestyle
- Club: Fenerbahçe Swimming
- Coach: Dimitry Mancevic
Medal record
Women's Swimming
Representing Turkey
Mediterranean Games
Bronze medal – third place	2013 Mersin	50 m freestyle
Bronze medal – third place	2013 Mersin	4×100 m freestyle

Burcu Dolunay (pronounced [ˈbuɾdʒu ˈdolunaj]; born 17 February 1984) is a Turkish female swimmer competing in the freestyle events. The 1.74 m (5 ft 9 in) tall sportswoman at 63 kg (139 lb) is a member of Galatasaray Swimming team since 2006. She studied at Istanbul University. Dolunay is holder of several national records in freestyle.

She qualified to participate in the 50 m freestyle and 100 m freestyle events at the 2012 Summer Olympics. At the 2013 Mediterranean Games held in Mersin, Turkey, she won two bronze medals in the 50 m freestyle and 4 × 100 m freestyle relay events.

== Life ==
Dolunay was born 17 February 1984 in İzmir, Turkey.

== Personal bests ==
Long course

- 50 m freestyle 25.22 NR (5 May 2012 - Istanbul, Turkey)
- 100 m freestyle 55.29 NR (2 May 2012 - Istanbul, Turkey)
- 4 × 100 m medley relay NR 4:07.56 (27 May 2012 - Debrecen, Hungary)
- 4 × 100 m freestyle relay NR 3:47.35 (21 June 2013 - Mersin, Turkey)

Short course

- 50 m freestyle 25.22 NR (11 December 2011 – Szczecin, Poland)
- 100 m freestyle 55.15 NR (16 December 2011 – Dubai, United Arab Emirates)
- 200 m freestyle 2:00.58 NR (14 November 2009 – Berlin, Germany)
- 100 m individual medley 1:02.58 NR (15 November 2009 – Berlin, Germany)
- 4×50 m freestyle relay 1:42.82 NR (23 December 2011 – Istanbul, Turkey)
- 4 × 100 m freestyle relay 3:55.24 NR (2005 – Istanbul, Turkey)
- 4×50 m medley relay 1:53.48 NR (12 December 2009 – Istanbul, Turkey)

== See also ==
- Turkish women in sports
