= Ahmet Fetgeri Aşeni =

Turkish politician

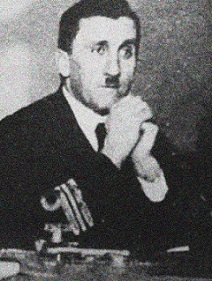

Personal details
- Born: 1886 Sakarya Province, Ottoman Empire
- Died: 1966 (aged 79–80) Kocaeli, Turkey

Ahmet Fetgeri Aşeni (1886–1966) was a Turkish navy officer, sports official and politician during the Atatürk era. He was also one of the founding members of Beşiktaş JK, which he also served as a president.

== Life ==
He served as the president of the Turkish Wrestling Federation and the Turkish Athletics Federation. He graduated from the MSU Naval Academy, which is today the faculty of Istanbul Technical University. Ahmet Fetgeri's brother Mehmet Ali Fetgeri was a gymnast and weightlifter, and his daughter Suat Fetgeri was a fencing athlete.

== Legacy ==
The Ahmet Fetgeri Sports Hall, located in the Fulya neighborhood of Istanbul's Şişli district and bearing his name, continued to exist from 1985 until 2005.

19 May Commemoration of Atatürk, Youth and Sports Day was enacted with the permission of the Eternal Chief Atatürk after Ahmet Fetgeri Bey's proposal was accepted on the dais on a day when the dignitaries of the Turkish Sports Organization gathered for the Sports Congress.

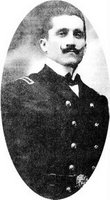
1920s portrait
