= Suat Aşani =

Turkish fencer (1916–1970)

Suat Fetgeri Aşeni
Personal information
- Born: 22 September 1916
- Died: 22 April 1970 (aged 53)

Sport
- Sport: Fencing

Suat Fetgeri Aşeni (22 September 1916 – 22 April 1970) was a Turkish fencer. She competed in the women's individual foil event at the 1936 Summer Olympics. She and her colleague Halet Çambel were the first Turkish sportswomen to participate at the Olympics. Her father, Ahmet Fetgeri Aşeni, was one of the founding members of Beşiktaş JK.
