= Commemoration of Atatürk, Youth and Sports Day =

Annual Turkish national holiday

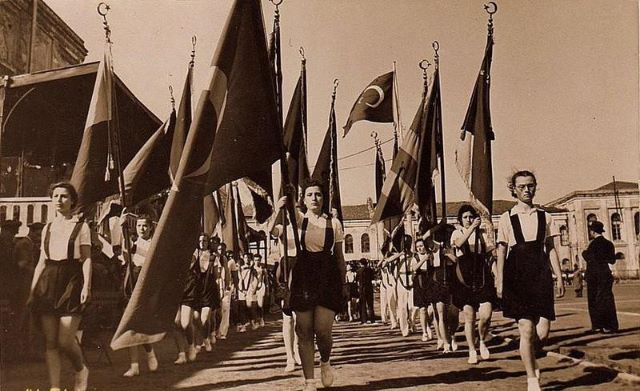
- Flag parade of girls at the Youth And Sports Day in 1939
- Official name: 19 Mayıs Atatürk'ü Anma, Gençlik ve Spor Bayramı (since 1981)
- Also called: Gazi Day (1926–1935); Atatürk Day (1935–1938); Youth and Sports Day (1938–1981)
- Observed by: Turkey; Northern Cyprus
- Significance: Mustafa Kemal's landing at Samsun on May 19, 1919, which is regarded as the beginning of the Turkish War of Independence
- Date: May 19
- 2025 date: 19 May
- Next time: May 19, 2027
- Frequency: annual

The Commemoration of Atatürk, Youth and Sports Day (Turkish: Atatürk'ü Anma, Gençlik ve Spor Bayramı) is an annual Turkish national holiday celebrated on 19 May to commemorate Mustafa Kemal's landing at Samsun on 19 May 1919, which is regarded in the official historiography as the beginning of the Turkish War of Independence.

== History ==
=== Gymnastics Festival ===
The first "Gymnastics Festival" (İdman Bayramı) was held at the sports ground of Kadıköy İttihad Sports (Union Club until 1915) by the Erkek Muallim Mektebi (Teachers' College for Boys), on the personal initiative of Selim Sırrı Bey (Tarcan), who was at the time an inspector of the Ministry of Education of the Ottoman Empire. According to some sources, it was held on 12 May 1916; according to Faik Reşit Unat, in May 1916; and according to Selim Sırrı Tarcan himself, on 29 April 1916. Selim Sırrı Bey had brought a score of the Swedish folk song Tre trallande jäntor ("Three carolling girls"), collected by Felix Körling. This folk song became the anthem Dağ Başını Duman Almış, with Turkish lyrics written by Ali Ulvi Bey (Elöve) in 1917, and was sung at this festival for the first time.

=== Mustafa Kemal's landing in Samsun ===
Fahrî Yâver-i Hazret-i Şehriyâri (Note: "Honorary Aide-de-camp to His Majesty Sultan",) Mirliva Mustafa Kemal Pasha was assigned as the inspector of the Ninth Army Troops Inspectorate on April 30, 1919, tasked to oversee the disbanding the Ottoman Army required by the Treaty of Sèvres, and left Istanbul with his staff aboard steamer SS Bandırma for Samsun. After landing in Samsun on May 19, Mustafa Kemal started the Turkish National Movement in contravention to his orders, an act that would lead to the Turkish War of Independence and ultimately the proclamation of the Republic of Turkey in 1923.

Mustafa Kemal and his staff left Samsun on May 24 for transferring their headquarters to the village of Karageçmiş in Havza district. According to Hamza Eroğlu, they sang the march Dağ Başını Duman Almış while marching from Samsun to Havza, and according to Şevket Süreyya Aydemir, they also sang this song after leaving Havza to go to Amasya.

=== Atatürk's later years ===
With the Law No. 3466 dated June 20, 1938 and with the initiatives of Beşiktaş J.K. Founding Member Ahmet Fetgeri Aşeni, "May 19" was officialized as the Festival of Youth and Sports. The march Dağ Başını Duman Almış was announced as the Gençlik ve Spor Bayramı Marşı (March of the Festival of Youth and Sports, popularly known as the Gençlik Marşı).

== Practice ==
Young people sing the national anthem, visit Anıtkabir, recite poems, take part in parades and sporting events, and perform cultural activities such as folk dances and epic drama to commemorate the beginning of the national struggle launched by Atatürk and his companions in 1919, which would lead to the establishment of the Republic of Turkey in 1923.

The Turkish Republic of Northern Cyprus also observes this day as a national holiday.

== Atatürk's birthday ==
Atatürk was born in 1881. But his birth date is not known. In one of his speeches, he declared that he considers his birthday as May 19, in clear reference to the beginning of the national struggle in 1919.

== Media ==
Gençlik Marşı (Youth Anthem) "Dağ Başını Duman Almış"
Instrumental

== See also ==
- Youth Day in other countries
- Public holidays in Turkey
