= Melisa Akarsu =

Turkish swimmer (born 1993)

Personal information
- Nationality: TUR
- Born: 1993 (age 32–33)

Sport
- Sport: Swimming
- Strokes: Butterfly
- Club: Fenerbahçe Swimming
Medal record
Women's Swimming
Representing Turkey
Islamic Solidarity Games
| Gold medal – first place | 2013 Palembang | 4×200m free relay |
| Silver medal – second place | 2013 Palembang | 400m ind medley |
| Bronze medal – third place | 2013 Palembang | 200m butterfly |
- Updated on October 11, 2013

Melisa Akarsu (born 1993) is a Turkish swimmer competing in the butterfly events.

== Career ==
A member of Fenerbahçe Swimming in Istanbul, she is holder of national records in the 17-18 age category in 100 m butterfly with 1:02.02 and in 200 m butterfly with 2:17.00 set in June 2011.

Akarsu ranked 8th in the 200 m butterfly event at the 2012 European Short Course Swimming Championships held in Chartres, France.

She won one gold, one silver and one bronze medal at the 2013 Islamic Solidarity Games held in Palembang, Indonesia.

== Achievements ==
| Year | Competition | Venue | Position | Event | Notes |
|---|---|---|---|---|---|
| 2012 | European Short Course Swimming Championships | Chartres, France | 8th | 200 m Butterfly | 2:11.91 |
| 2013 | XVII Mediterranean Games | Mersin, Turkey | 4th | 400 metre individual medley | 4:57.64 NR |
| 2013 | XVII Mediterranean Games | Mersin, Turkey | 4th | 4×200 metre freestyle relay | 8:25.01 NR |
| 2013 | 3rd Islamic Solidarity Games | Palembang, Indonesia | 1st | 4 × 200 m freestyle relay | 8:29.60 |
| 2013 | 3rd Islamic Solidarity Games | Palembang, Indonesia | 2nd | 400 m individual medley | 5:01.25 |
| 2013 | 3rd Islamic Solidarity Games | Palembang, Indonesia | 3rd | 200 m butterfly | 2:19.96 |

== See also ==
- Turkish women in sports
