= Swimming at the 2013 Mediterranean Games – Women's 4 × 100 metre freestyle relay =

Women's 4 × 100 metre freestyle relay at the 2013 Mediterranean Games
- Venue: Mersin Olympic Swimming Pool
- Location: Mersin, Turkey
- Dates: 21 June
- Competitors: 28 from 7 nations
- Winning time: 3:42.37

Medalists
gold medal	Anna Santamans; Lauriane Haag; Mathilde Cini; Béryl Gastaldello	France
silver medal	Stavroula Karantakou; Kristel Vourna; Theodora Giareni; Theodora Drakou	Greece
bronze medal	Esra Kübra Kaçmaz; Halime Zülal Zeren; Gizem Bozkurt; Burcu Dolunay	Turkey

The women's 4 × 100 metre freestyle relay competition of the swimming events at the 2013 Mediterranean Games took place on June 21 at the Mersin Olympic Swimming Pool in Mersin, Turkey. Italy is the defending champion from the 2009 Mediterranean Games.

The race consisted of eight lengths of the pool. Each of the four swimmers completes two lengths of the pool. The first swimmer has to touch the wall before the second leaves the starting block.

== Records ==
Prior to this competition, the existing world and Mediterranean Games records were as follows:

World record	Netherlands (NED); Inge Dekker (53.61); Ranomi Kromowidjojo (52.30); Femke Heemskerk (53.03); Marleen Veldhuis (52.78)	3:31.72	Rome, Italy	July 26, 2009
Mediterranean Games record	Italy (ITA); Erica Buratto; Laura Letrari; Giorgia Mancin; Federica Pellegrini	3:40.63	Pescara, Italy	June 27, 2009

== Results ==
All times are in minutes and seconds.

KEY:	q	Fastest non-qualifiers	Q	Qualified	GR	Games record	NR	National record	PB	Personal best	SB	Seasonal best
