= Demir Atasoy =

Ukrainian-born Turkish swimmer

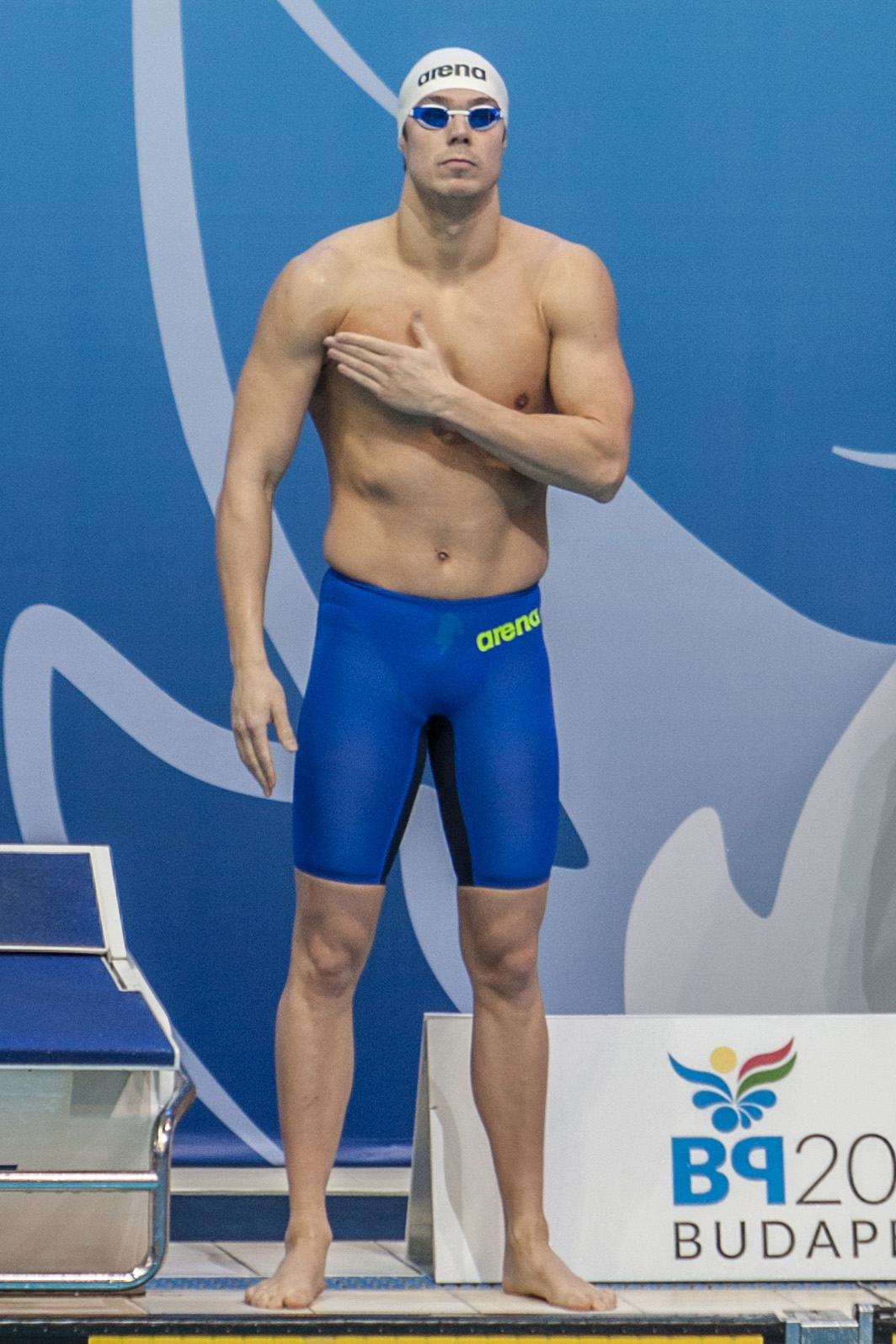
- Netanya 2015

Personal information
- Full name: Dmytro Cherkasov
- Nationality: Turkey
- Born: 26 May 1987 (age 39) Dnipropetrovsk, Ukrainian SSR
- Height: 1.93 m (6 ft 4 in)
- Weight: 85 kg (187 lb)

Sport
- Sport: Swimming
- Strokes: Breaststroke
- Club: Fenerbahçe Spor Kulübü
Medal record
Men's swimming
Representing Turkey
Islamic Solidarity Games
Gold medal – first place	2013 Palembang	50 m breaststroke
Gold medal – first place	2013 Palembang	100 m breaststroke
Gold medal – first place	2013 Palembang	4x100 m freestyle
Gold medal – first place	2013 Palembang	4x100 m medley
Silver medal – second place	2013 Palembang	4×200 m freestyle
Gold medal – first place	2017 Baku	100 m breaststroke
Gold medal – first place	2017 Baku	50 m breaststroke
Gold medal – first place	2017 Baku	4x100 m medley
Mediterranean Games
Bronze medal – third place	2013 Mersin	4×100 m medley
Mediterranean Open Games
Bronze medal – third place	2016 Marseille	50 m breaststroke
- Updated on October 11, 2013

Demir Atasoy (also Dmitry Cherkasov, born May 26, 1987, in Dnipropetrovsk, Ukrainian SSR) is a Ukrainian-born Turkish swimmer, who specialized in the breaststroke events. Laureate of the National Rating «Top 100 Outstanding Men of Kyiv Region».

== Career ==
Atasoy qualified for the men's 100 m breaststroke at the 2008 Summer Olympics in Beijing, by clearing a FINA B-standard time of 1:02.43 from the Croatian Open Championships in Dubrovnik. He challenged seven other swimmers on the fourth heat, including three-time Olympian Jakob Jóhann Sveinsson of Iceland. Atasoy edged out Serbia's Čaba Silađi to take the second spot by six hundredths of a second (0.06), posting his lifetime best of 1:02.25. Atasoy failed to advance into the semifinals, as he placed thirty-ninth overall on the first night of preliminaries.

At the 2013 Mediterranean Games held in Mersin, Turkey, he won the bronze medal in the men's 4 × 100 m medley relay.

He won four gold medals and one silver medal at the 2013 Islamic Solidarity Games held in Palembang, Indonesia.

== Achievements ==
Year	Competition	Venue	Position	Event	Notes
2013	17th Mediterranean Games	Mersin, Turkey	3rd	4 × 100 m medley	
2013	3rd Islamic Solidarity Games	Palembang, Indonesia	1st	50 m breaststroke	28.21
2013	3rd Islamic Solidarity Games	Palembang, Indonesia	1st	100 m breaststroke	1:02.27
2013	3rd Islamic Solidarity Games	Palembang, Indonesia	1st	4 × 100 m freestyle relay	3:24.77
2013	3rd Islamic Solidarity Games	Palembang, Indonesia	1st	4 × 100 m medley relay	3:44.20
2013	3rd Islamic Solidarity Games	Palembang, Indonesia	2nd	4 × 200 m freestyle relay	7:32.20
