= Mürvet Yavuztürk =

Turkish footballer and referee

Personal information
- Date of birth: November 10, 1985 (age 40)
- Place of birth: Bafra, Samsun, Turkey

Senior career*
Years	Team	Apps	(Gls)
2001–2003	Samsungücü	1	(0)

International career^{‡}
2003	Turkey	0	(0)
- * Club domestic league appearances and goals as of March 17, 2002 ‡ National team caps and goals as of September 23, 2003

Mürvet Yavuztürk
- Other occupation: = referee

Domestic
Years	League	Role
2015–	Women's First League	referee

Mürvet Yavuztürk (born November 10, 1985) is a Turkish female football referee and former women's footballer.

== Early years ==
Mürvet Yavuztürk was born in the northern Turkish town Bafra of Samsun Province on November 10, 1985. She is a teacher of physical education at a middle school in Bulancak, Giresun.

== Playing career ==
=== Club ===
Mürvet Yavuztürk received her license for her hometown club Samsungücü on February 12, 2001. She debuted in her team's Women's League match on March 17, 2002. This was her only appearance. Since the women's football leagues in Turkey were not held between 2003 and 2006, her football playing career took an early end.

== Referee ==
Yavuztürk began her referee career debuting in the Youth League as second assistant referee on November 1, 2008.

On February 13, 2010, she was appointed to officiate a Coca-Cola Academy U-14 League match as referee. She was also in charge of first, second assistant referee and fourth official roles in various regional leagues for the age categories of boys' U-15, U-18 and A2 League, TFF Third League and TFF Second League. She officiated as referee a Regional Youth Development U-18 League match as referee on December 11, 2010, and a Women's Regional League match on December 26, 2010. She was tasked as referee of a Women's Third League match played on November 9, 2014, and finally she was promoted to officiate a Women's First League match on November 8, 2015.

She debuted internationally serving as an assistant referee in a friendly match of the Turkey women's U-19 team on March 17, 2015.

As of December 20, 2015, Yavuztürk served in 125 football games in various roles.
