= Nezir Karap =

Turkish swimmer (born 1994)

Personal information
- National team: Turkey
- Born: 2 January 1994 (age 32) Istanbul, Turkey
- Height: 179 cm (5 ft 10 in)
- Weight: 74 kg (163 lb)

Sport
- Sport: Swimming
- Strokes: freestyle
- Club: Enkaspor
Medal record
Men's swimming
Representing Turkey
Islamic Solidarity Games
Silver medal – second place	2013 Palembang	200 m freestyle
Bronze medal – third place	2013 Palembang	400 m freestyle
Bronze medal – third place	2013 Palembang	800 m freestyle
Gold medal – first place	2013 Palembang	4×100 m freestyle
Silver medal – second place	2013 Palembang	4×200 m freestyle
Mediterranean Games
Bronze medal – third place	2013 Mersin	4×200 m freestyle

Nezir Karap (born 2 January 1994) is a Turkish swimmer, competing in the freestyle stroke event. He was a member of Galatasaray Swimming before he transferred to Enkaspor, and undertakes three days of strength training a week.

== Career ==
He won the silver medal in the 200 m freestyle, the bronze medal in the 400 m freestyle, the bronze medal in the 800 m freestyle, the gold medal in the 4 × 100 m freestyle relay and the silver medal in the 4 × 200 m freestyle relay event of the Aquatics at the 2013 Islamic Solidarity Games in Palembang, Indonesia.

Karap took the bronze medal in the 4 × 200 m freestyle relay event at the 2013 Mediterranean Games in Mersin, Turkey.

He holds a number of national records including in 400m freestyle (3:50.07 in 2015), 800m freestyle (7:59.20 in 2016), 1500m freestyle (15:16.29 in 2016), and 4 × 200 m freestyle relay (7:22.15 in 2015).

He earned a quota spot for the 2016 Summer Olympics with his performance in the 400m freestyle event at the 2015 World Aquatics Championships in Kazan, Russia. His time was also a new national record.
