= Halime Zülal Zeren =

Turkish swimmer (born 1995)

Personal information
- Nationality: TUR
- Born: 15 April 1995 (age 31)
- Height: 1.77 m (5 ft 9 1/2 in)
- Weight: 62 kg (137 lb)

Sport
- Sport: Swimming
- Strokes: Freestyle, backstroke
- Club: Fenerbahçe Swimming
Medal record
Women's Swimming
Representing Turkey
Mediterranean Games
Bronze medal – third place	2013 Mersin	200 m backstroke
Bronze medal – third place	2013 Mersin	4x100 m freestyle
Islamic Solidarity Games
Gold medal – first place	2013 Palembang	200 m freestyle
Gold medal – first place	2013 Palembang	50 m backstroke
Gold medal – first place	2013 Palembang	200 m backstroke
Gold medal – first place	2013 Palembang	4x100 m freestyle
Gold medal – first place	2013 Palembang	4x200 m freestyle
Silver medal – second place	2025 Riyadh	100 m backstroke
Silver medal – second place	2025 Riyadh	200 m backstroke
Bronze medal – third place	2013 Palembang	4x100 m medley

Halime Zülal Zeren (born 15 April 1995) is a Turkish female swimmer competing in freestyle and backstroke events. She is 1.77 m (5 ft 9 1/2 in) tall at 62 kg (137 lb). Zeren holds national records in various disciplines and age categories. She swims for Fenerbahçe Swimming.

== Career ==
Zeren attended Ohio State University, having previously swam at Işık High School in Istanbul.

At the 2013 Mediterranean Games in Mersin, Turkey, Zeren won two bronze medals and set three national records.

She was very successful at the 2013 Islamic Solidarity Games held in Palembang, Indonesia by taking a total of six medals, five of them in gold.

== Achievements ==
Year	Competition	Venue	Position	Event	Notes
2013	XVII Mediterranean Games	Mersin, Turkey	3rd	200m backstroke	2:14.93 NR
2013	XVII Mediterranean Games	Mersin, Turkey	3rd	4×100m freestyle	3:47.35 NR
2013	XVII Mediterranean Games	Mersin, Turkey	4th	4×200m freestyle relay	8:25.01 NR
2013	3rd Islamic Solidarity Games	Palembang, Indonesia	1st	200 m freestyle	2:04.52
2013	3rd Islamic Solidarity Games	Palembang, Indonesia	1st	50m backstroke	30.40
2013	3rd Islamic Solidarity Games	Palembang, Indonesia	1st	200m backstroke	2:16.70
2013	3rd Islamic Solidarity Games	Palembang, Indonesia	1st	4×100m freestyle relay	3:54.02
2013	3rd Islamic Solidarity Games	Palembang, Indonesia	1st	4×200m freestyle relay	8:29.60
2013	3rd Islamic Solidarity Games	Palembang, Indonesia	3rd	4×100m medley relay	4:21:19

== See also ==
- Turkish women in sports
