= Gizem Bozkurt =

Turkish swimmer (born 1993)

Personal information
- Nationality: TUR
- Born: May 23, 1993 (age 33)
- Height: 168 cm (5 ft 6 in)
- Weight: 55 kg (121 lb)

Sport
- Sport: Swimming
- Strokes: Freestyle, medley
- Club: Fenerbahçe Swimming
Medal record
Women's Swimming
Representing Turkey
Mediterranean Games
Bronze medal – third place	2013 Mersin	4×100m free relay
Islamic Solidarity Games
Silver medal – second place	2013 Palembang	100 m freestyle
Gold medal – first place	2013 Palembang	200 m ind medley
Gold medal – first place	2013 Palembang	4×100 m free relay
Gold medal – first place	2013 Palembang	4×200 m free relay
Bronze medal – third place	2013 Palembang	4×100 m medley rel

Gizem Bozkurt (born 23 May 1993) is a Turkish female swimmer competing in freestyle and mostly in the medley as well as relay events. Currently, she is in the prep class of Özyeğin University in Istanbul.

== Career ==
A member of Fenerbahçe Swimming in Istanbul, she is holder of many national records in various medlay and relay swimming disciplines.

She competed at the 2010 Summer Youth Olympics held in Singapore. Participated in three events, her best result was the eighth place in 200m individual medley, for which she set also a new national record.

She won a bronze medal in 4 × 100 m freestyle relay at the 2013 Mediterranean Games setting also a national record with her teammates in Mersin, Turkey. Bozkurt took three gold, one silver and one bronze medal at the 2013 Islamic Solidarity Games held in Palembang, Indonesia.

== Achievements ==
Year	Competition	Venue	Position	Event	Notes
2013	XVII Mediterranean Games	Mersin, Turkey	4th	200m ind. medley	2:17.08 NR
2013	XVII Mediterranean Games	Mersin, Turkey	3rd	4 × 100 m freestyle relay	3:47.35 NR
2013	XVII Mediterranean Games	Mersin, Turkey	4th	4 × 200 m freestyle relay	8:25.01 NR
2013	3rd Islamic Solidarity Games	Palembang, Indonesia	2nd	100 m freestyle	58.50
2013	3rd Islamic Solidarity Games	Palembang, Indonesia	1st	200 m ind. medley	2:21.22
2013	3rd Islamic Solidarity Games	Palembang, Indonesia	1st	4 × 100 m freestyle relay	3:54.02
2013	3rd Islamic Solidarity Games	Palembang, Indonesia	1st	4 × 200 m freestyle relay	8:29.60
2013	3rd Islamic Solidarity Games	Palembang, Indonesia	1st	4 × 100 m medley relay	4:21:19

== See also ==
- Turkish women in sports
