= Swimming at the 2013 Islamic Solidarity Games =

Swimming competition

- Venue: Jaka Baring Swimming Stadium
- Dates: 24–29 September

Swimming at the 2013 Islamic Solidarity Games was held in Jaka Baring Swimming Stadium in Palembang from 24 to 29 September 2013.

== Medalists ==
=== Men ===
Event	Gold		Silver		Bronze	
50 m freestyle	Oussama Sahnoune; Algeria	22.84	Shehab Younis; Egypt	22.96	Doğa Çelik; Turkey	23.19
100 m freestyle	Oussama Sahnoune; Algeria	49.96	Doğa Çelik; Turkey	50.44	Adham Aly; Egypt	51.70
200 m freestyle	Daniel Bego; Malaysia	1:51.36	Nezir Karap; Turkey	1:52.19	Kevin Yeap; Malaysia	1:52.29
400 m freestyle	Kevin Yeap; Malaysia	3:55.11	Marwan El-Amrawy; Egypt	3:55.34	Nezir Karap; Turkey	3:59.33
800 m freestyle	Ahmed Akram; Egypt	8:05.68	Marwan El-Amrawy; Egypt	8:10.12	Nezir Karap; Turkey	8:21.24
1500 m freestyle	Ahmed Akram; Egypt	15:33.08	Kevin Yeap; Malaysia	15:39.86	Marwan El-Amrawy; Egypt	15:43.24
50 m backstroke	I Gede Siman Sudartawa; Indonesia	25.63	Güven Duvan; Turkey	26.28	Tern Jian Han; Malaysia	26.73
100 m backstroke	I Gede Siman Sudartawa; Indonesia	55.69	Güven Duvan; Turkey	56.85	Tern Jian Han; Malaysia	58.01
200 m backstroke	Boris Kirillov; Azerbaijan	2:04.98	I Gede Siman Sudartawa; Indonesia	2:05.01	Ahmed Bahgat; Egypt	2:06.16
50 m breaststroke	Demir Atasoy; Turkey	28.21	Ahmed Bayoumi; Egypt	29.17	Shaun Yap; Malaysia	29.36
100 m breaststroke	Demir Atasoy; Turkey	1:02.27	Dennis Josua Tiwa; Indonesia	1:04.32	Ahmed Bayoumi; Egypt	1:04.66
200 m breaststroke	Yap See Tuan; Malaysia	2:18.16	Mohamed Gadallah; Egypt	2:20.17	Alpkan Örnek; Turkey	2:20.89
50 m butterfly	Triady Fauzi Sidiq; Indonesia	24.59	Yevgeniy Lazuka; Azerbaijan	24.61	Shehab Younis; Egypt	24.99
100 m butterfly	Triady Fauzi Sidiq; Indonesia	53.18	Marwan Adel; Egypt	54.80	Yevgeniy Lazuka; Azerbaijan	55.59
200 m butterfly	Triady Fauzi Sidiq; Indonesia	1:59.66	Gönen Kara; Turkey	2:04.73	Vernon Lee; Malaysia	2:04.91
200 m individual medley	Ahmed Bahgat; Egypt	2:05.07	Mohamed Gadallah; Egypt	2:06.76	Alpkan Örnek; Turkey	2:07.38
400 m individual medley	Ahmed Akram; Egypt	4:26.48	Alpkan Örnek; Turkey	4:32.21	Ayman Klzie; Syria	4:32.73
4 × 100 m freestyle relay	Turkey; Alpkan Örnek; Nezir Karap; Demir Atasoy; Doğa Çelik	3:24.77	Algeria; Oussama Sahnoune; Badis Djendouci; Nazim Belkhodja; Ryad Djendouci	3:26.10	Indonesia; Triady Fauzi Sidiq; Putera Muhammad Randa; Alexis Wijaya Ohmar; Satrio Bagaskara	3:26.86
4 × 200 m freestyle relay	Malaysia; Kevin Yeap; Vernon Lee; Yeap Zheng Yang; Welson Sim	7:31.44	Turkey; Alpkan Örnek; Demir Atasoy; Nezir Karap; Doğa Çelik	7:32.20	Egypt; Marwan El-Amrawy; Ahmed Bahgat; Adham Aly; Ahmed Akram	7:32.46
4 × 100 m medley relay	Turkey; Güven Duvan; Demir Atasoy; Gönen Kara; Doğa Çelik	3:44.20	Indonesia; I Gede Siman Sudartawa; Dennis Josua Tiwa; Triady Fauzi Sidiq; Alexis Wijaya Ohmar	3:44.39	Egypt; Ahmed Akram; Ahmed Bayoumi; Marwan Adel; Adham Aly	3:48.83

=== Women ===
Event	Gold		Silver		Bronze	
50 m freestyle	Mai Atef; Egypt	26.72	Enny Susilawati Margono; Indonesia	26.78	Salma Zaytoun; Egypt	27.14
100 m freestyle	Esra Kübra Kaçmaz; Turkey	58.00	Gizem Bozkurt; Turkey	58.50	Hania Moro; Egypt	58.92
200 m freestyle	Halime Zülal Zeren; Turkey	2:04.52	Hania Moro; Egypt	2:05.57	Bayan Jumah; Syria	2:06.27
400 m freestyle	Khoo Cai Lin; Malaysia	4:20.99	Reem Kaseem; Egypt	4:23.11	Raina Ramdhani; Indonesia	4:24.22
800 m freestyle	Khoo Cai Lin; Malaysia	8:53.61	Reem Kaseem; Egypt	8:59.26	Raina Ramdhani; Indonesia	9:05.46
1500 m freestyle	Reem Kaseem; Egypt	17:08.13	Raina Ramdhani; Indonesia	17:21.27	Souad Cherouati; Algeria	17:34.89
50 m backstroke	Halime Zülal Zeren; Turkey	30.40	Mariam Sakr; Egypt	30.57	Nurul Fajar Fitriyati; Indonesia	30.70
100 m backstroke	Mariam Sakr; Egypt	1:03.95	Yessy Yosaputra; Indonesia	1:05.86	Nurul Fajar Fitriyati; Indonesia	1:06.24
200 m backstroke	Halime Zülal Zeren; Turkey	2:16.70	Yessy Yosaputra; Indonesia	2:20.65	Hania Moro; Egypt	2:22.76
50 m breaststroke	Christina Loh; Malaysia	33.23	Mai Atef; Egypt	33.27	Amira Kouza; Algeria	33.77
100 m breaststroke	Christina Loh; Malaysia	1:10.43	Mai Atef; Egypt	1:11.01	Nermin Balbaa; Egypt	1:12.75
200 m breaststroke	Christina Loh; Malaysia	2:33.02	Nadia Redza; Malaysia	2:34.86	Nermin Balbaa; Egypt	2:35.60
50 m butterfly	Yap Siew Hui; Malaysia	27.54	Esra Kübra Kaçmaz; Turkey	28.10	Ayşe Ezgi Yazıcı; Turkey	28.18
100 m butterfly	Yap Siew Hui; Malaysia	1:02.19	Esra Kübra Kaçmaz; Turkey	1:02.60	Ayşe Ezgi Yazıcı; Turkey	1:04.02
200 m butterfly	Monalisa Arieswati; Indonesia	2:16.55	Mariam Sakr; Egypt	2:19.73	Melisa Akarsu; Turkey	2:19.96
200 m individual medley	Gizem Bozkurt; Turkey	2:21.22	Yara Emad; Egypt	2:21.50	Nadia Redza; Malaysia	2:23.24
400 m individual medley	Khoo Cai Lin; Malaysia	4:55.49	Melisa Akarsu; Turkey	5:01.25	Yara Emad; Egypt	5:02.60
4 × 100 m freestyle relay	Turkey; Gizem Bozkurt; Ceren Dilek; Esra Kübra Kaçmaz; Halime Zülal Zeren	3:54.02	Egypt; Hania Moro; Mariam Sakr; Mai Atef; Reem Kaseem	3:54.65	Indonesia; Ressa Kania Dewi; Raina Ramdhani; Kathriana Mella Gustianjani; Enny Susilawati Margono	3:55.87
4 × 200 m freestyle relay	Turkey; Esra Kübra Kaçmaz; Melisa Akarsu; Gizem Bozkurt; Halime Zülal Zeren	8:29.60	Egypt; Mariam Sakr; Yara Emad; Reem Kaseem; Hania Moro	8:33.10	Indonesia; Kathriana Mella Gustianjani; Iffy Nadia Fahmiruwhanti; Ressa Kania Dewi; Raina Ramdhani	8:34.70
4 × 100 m medley relay	Egypt; Mariam Sakr; Mai Atef; Hania Moro; Reem Kaseem	4:18:11	Malaysia; Nadia Redza; Christina Loh; Yap Siew Hui; Khoo Cai Lin	4:19:34	Turkey; Halime Zülal Zeren; Ceren Dilek; Ayşe Ezgi Yazıcı; Gizem Bozkurt	4:21:19

== Medal table ==
Rank	Nation	Gold	Silver	Bronze	Total
1	Malaysia (MAS)	12	3	6	21
2	Turkey (TUR)	11	11	9	31
3	Egypt (EGY)	8	17	13	38
4	Indonesia (INA)	6	7	7	20
5	Algeria (ALG)	2	1	2	5
6	Azerbaijan (AZE)	1	1	1	3
7	Syria (SYR)	0	0	2	2
Totals (7 entries)		40	40	40	120
