= Şahika Ercümen =

Turkish dietician and world record holding freediver

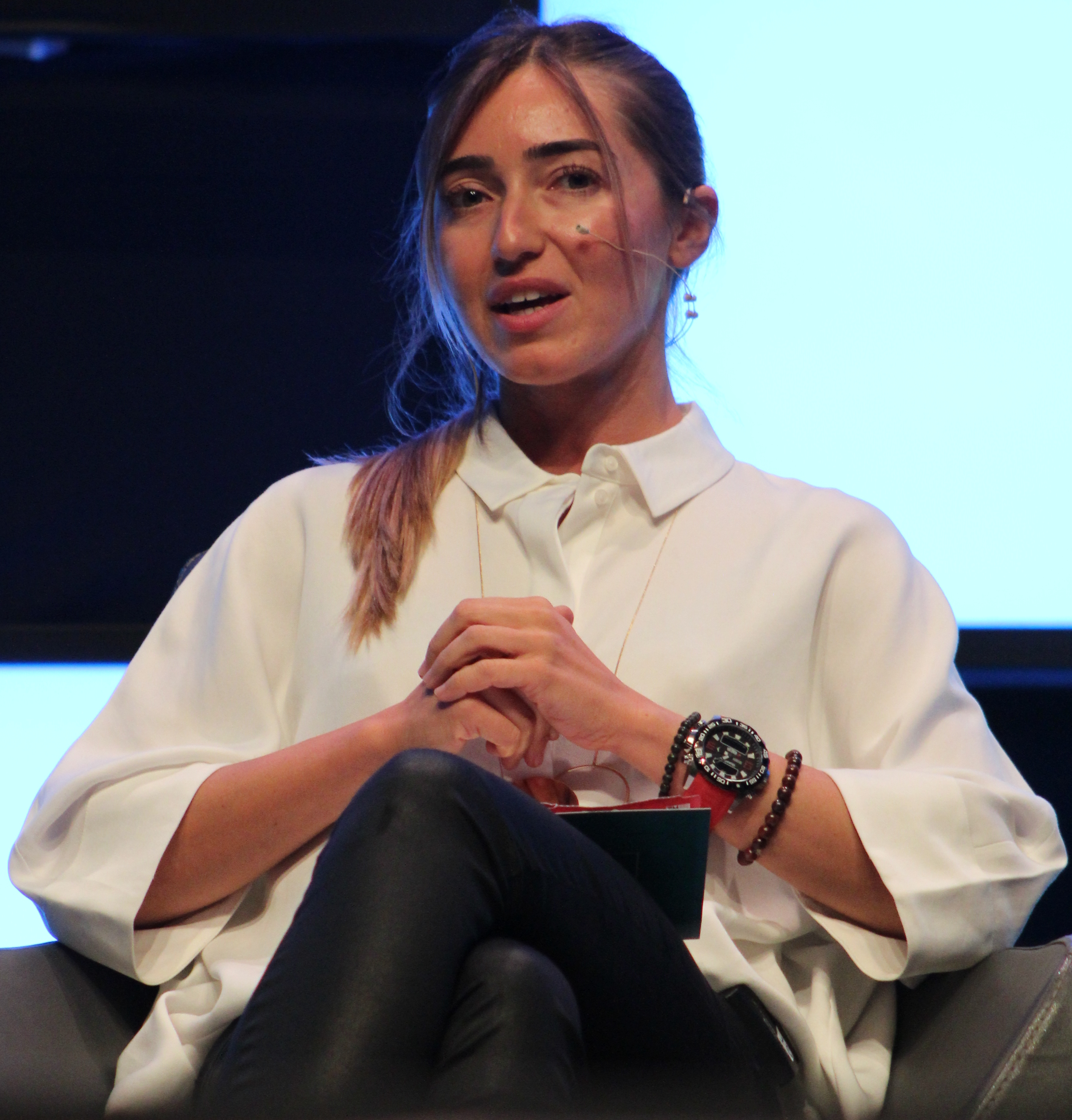
- Born: 16 January 1985 (age 41); Çanakkale, Turkey
- Education: Başkent University, Ankara
- Occupations: Free-diver, dietitian
- Known for: world record free diver

Şahika Ercümen (born 16 January 1985) is a Turkish dietitian and world record holder free-diver.

Born on January 16, 1985, in Çanakkale, she was educated at the Gazi Primary School, and received a secondary education at the Milli Piyango Anatolian High School in her hometown. For her higher education, she moved to Ankara, and became a dietitian graduating from the Department of Nutrition and Dietetics at Başkent University's Faculty of Health Sciences.

Her participation in underwater sports began with scuba diving and underwater rugby. For twelve years, she is interested in various branches of underwater sports, and is a member of four national teams since 2001. She participated with the underwater hockey, underwater rugby, underwater orienteering and free diving national teams in the World and European Championships.

== Achievements ==
Her 110 m (360 ft) long dynamic apnea under ice (DYN) that was achieved on February 11, 2011, in Lake Weissensee, Austria, found entry into the Guinness Book of World Records for both for men and women. Former records were 70 m (230 ft) for women and 108 m (354 ft) for men.

Şahika Ercümen is former world record holder of constant weight with fins at sea (CWT) discipline with 70 m (230 ft) set in Dahab, Egypt on November 10, 2011 (recognized by CMAS). The former record belonged to Tanya Streeter with 67 m (220 ft). The same day at the same place, she set another CMAS-recognized world record diving 60 m (200 ft) deep in variable weight apnea without fins at sea (VNF).

On June 1, 2013, she broke her own world record diving in the VNF discipline to a depth of 61 m (200 ft) in saline soda waters of Lake Van, eastern Turkey (recognized by CMAS). She stated that she preferred the site for her world-record free-diving attempt because she wanted to call world's attention to the migration of Pearl Mullet (Chalcalburnus tarichi), also called Lake Van fish.

She set a new free-diving world record in the VNF discipline reaching the 91 m (299 ft) depth mark in 2:49 minutes at Kaş, Antalya, southern Turkey on July 23, 2014. Former record in this discipline, which was set the previous year, belonged to Derya Can, another Turkish diver.

On October 22, 2016, Ercümen set a new world record off Kaş, Turkey diving to a depth of 110 m (360 ft) in the variable weight apnea with fins at sea (VWT) discipline in 2:44 minutes. Her record was recognized by CMAS officials at site.

She set a new CMAS world record for women diving in sweet water of Lake Salda in Yeşilova, Burdur Province, Turkey to 65 m (213 ft) in 1:58 minutes. The previous world record was at 55 m (180 ft).

On 26 October 2021, she set a new world record in variable weight apnea without fins at sea (VNF) category at Kaş, Antalya, Turkey with 100 m (330 ft), which is valid for women and men.

In October 2025, she set a new world record of 106 meters in the variable weight apnea without fins at sea category, diving to 107 meters with the slogan “Let Gaza breathe, let darkness turn to light” to draw attention to Gaza.

== World records ==
DYN under ice

- 110 m (360 ft) - February 11, 2011 in Lake Weissensee, Austria

CWT

- 70 m (230 ft) - November 10, 2011 in Dahab, Egypt

VNF

- 60 m (200 ft) - November 10, 2011 in Dahab, Egypt
- 61 m (200 ft) - June 1, 2013 in Lake Van, Turkey
- 91 m (299 ft) - July 23, 2014 in Kaş, Antalya, Turkey
- 100 m (330 ft) - October 26, 2021 in Kaş, Antalya, Turkey
- 107 m (351 ft) - October 17, 2025 in Kaş, Antalya, Turkey

VWT

- 110 m (360 ft) - October 22, 2016 in Kaş, Antalya, Turkey

Fresh water

- 65 m (213 ft) - October 26, 2018 in Lake Salda, Yeşilova, Burdur, Turkey
