= Bedirli =

Bedirli can refer to:

- Bədirli, Azerbaijan
- Bedirli, Yeşilova, Turkey
