= Güney, Burdur =

Güney
- Village
- Location within Turkey
- Coordinates: 37°30′N 29°33′E
- Country: Turkey
- Province: Burdur
- District: Yeşilova
- Elevation: 1,030 m (3,380 ft)
- Population (2021): 1,067
- Time zone: UTC+3 (TRT)
- Postal code: 15520
- Area code: 0248

Güney is a village in Yeşilova District of Burdur Province, Turkey. Its population is 1,067 (2021). Before the 2013 reorganisation, it was a town (belde). It is situated 8 kilometres (5.0 mi) west of Salda Lake. Distance to Yeşilova is 22 kilometres (14 mi) and to Burdur is 80 kilometres (50 mi).

The area around Güney was inhabited during Lydian and Roman era. The early Turkish settlements which were founded in the second half of the 11th century were ruined during the First Crusade. After the crusades the present town which is more secluded was founded. Another advantage of the town is the mountain system which blocks the north winds (The name of the town Güney means south). The main economic activity of the town is agriculture. Cereals, grapes and sugar beet are the main crops. Beehiving and dairying are other activities.
