= Salda =

Salda may refer to:

- Salda, Burdur, a township in Yeşilova district of Burdur Province, Turkey
- Salda, Estonia, village in Kadrina Parish, Lääne-Viru County, Estonia
- Salda Lake in Turkey
- Salda (Tagil), a tributary of the Tagil in Sverdlovsk Oblast, Russia
- Salda (Tura), a tributary of the Tura in Sverdlovsk Oblast, Russia
- Salda (bug), a genus of bugs in family Saldidae
- Salda River, a transboundary river between India and Bangladesh.
