= Alessia Zecchini =

Italian freediver (born 1992)

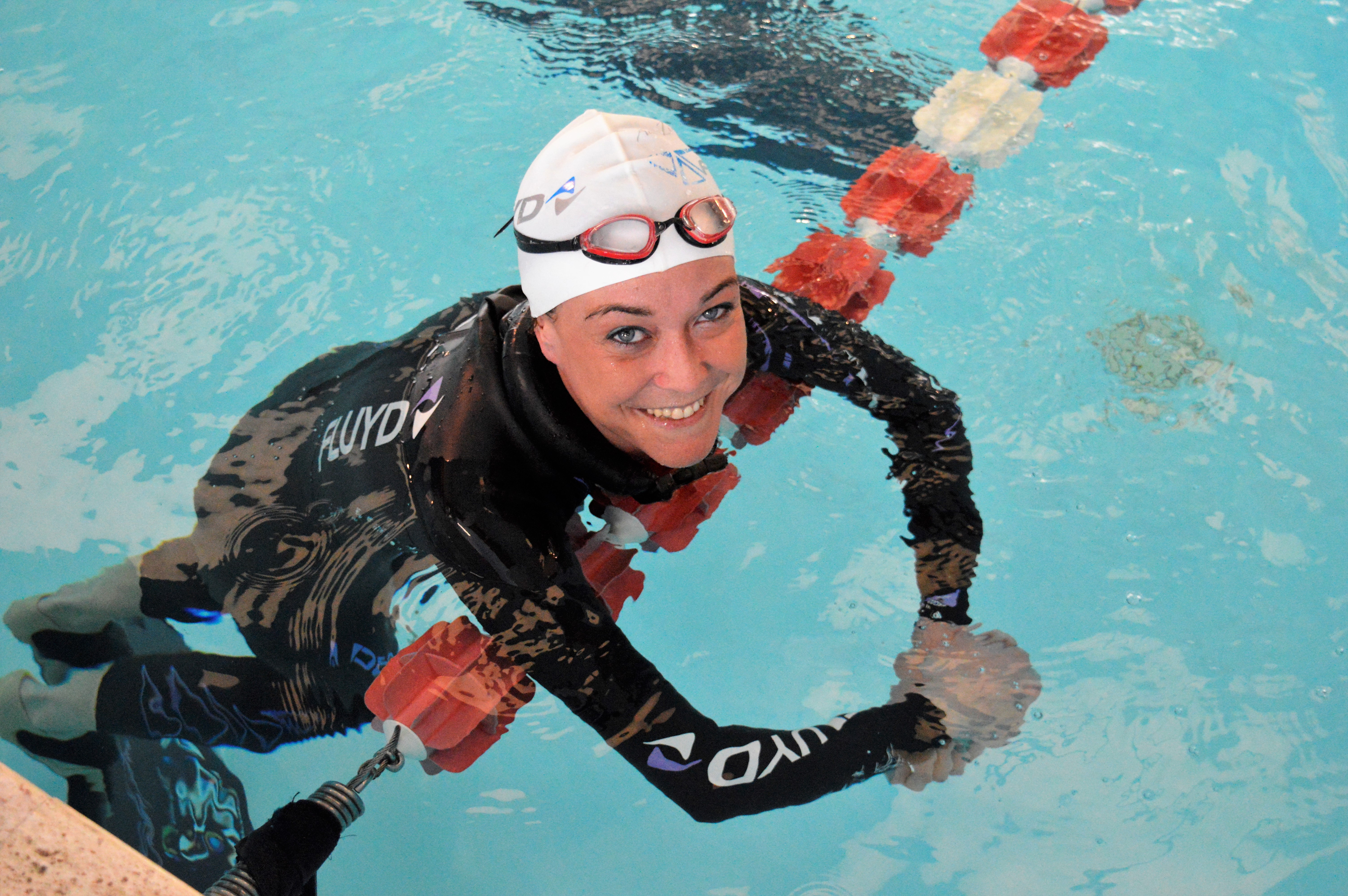
- Zecchini in 2017
- Born: 30 June 1992 (age 34); Rome, Italy
- Occupation: Freediver

Alessia Zecchini ([aˈlɛs.sja d͡zekˈki.ni], born 30 June 1992) is an Italian freediver who has set world and Italian records in freediving.

At the age of 13, Zecchini completed her first federal apnea course in A.s.d. "Apnea Blu Mare". In 2009 she changed clubs and became an athlete of Dive Free Roma and Nuoto Belle Arti.

Since 2012, Zecchini has been part of the indoor and outdoor Italian national freediving team, so far winning 16 gold medals, five silver and two bronze at the World Championships and three golds, six silvers and one bronze at the European Championships.

On 18 October 2019, Zecchini became the first woman to have reached a depth of −100m exclusively with the use of her arms (free immersion), during the "Nirvana Oceanquest" in Curaçao, Dutch Caribbean.

Zecchini became the subject of the 2023 biographical documentary film The Deepest Breath directed by Laura McGann.

== Career ==
From 2007 to 2010, Zecchini attended in rallies with the national team, although she could not compete in the top category due to her young age.

In 2011, she participated in her first Italian championship in Turin, taking second place, behind Ilaria Bonin. The placings achieved also in the following year earned her the call to be part of the national team. In 2012, she participated in her first Confédération Mondiale des Activités Subaquatiques (CMAS) European Championship in Antalya, Turkey, achieving good placings (fourth place in Jump Blue and sixth in static apnea).

In 2013, during the CMAS World Championship in Kazan, Russia, she won the gold medal in static freediving (STA) with a time of 6' 23", then obtained a medal in every discipline, including a silver in dynamics without fins (DNF) and a bronze in dynamic with monofin (DYN). The same year, Zecchini used the guide rope to pull herself down to a depth of −81 m (−266 ft) without using ballast or fins and thereby set a new world record in the free immersion discipline recognized by the CMAS. At the Italian Depth Championship in Ischia, she achieved her first CMAS world record in constant weight with the monofin (CWT) with −81 m (−266 ft).

In 2014, she participated in her first AIDA International competition, the Team World Championship in Cagliari, winning three silver medals in dynamic apnea with the monofin with 223 m (732 ft), in static apnea with the time of 6' 39", in constant weight with a depth of −84 m (−276 ft) and setting two Italian records. At the CMAS European Championship held in Tenerife, she won the silver medal in dynamic apnea with monofin (DYN) with 218 m (715 ft), and third place in the static apnea competition with a time of 6' 08". During the Italian depth championship in Ischia, she achieved her second CMAS world record in constant weight with the monofin (CWT) with −86 m (−282 ft).

In 2015, Zecchini took part in the CMAS Indoor World Championship in Mulhouse and, together with her partner Ilaria Bonin, they won five gold and silver medals. Zecchini won the competition in dynamics without fins (DNF) with 165 m (541 ft), also setting the CMAS world record. In that same competition, she also won two silvers (DYN with 234 m (768 ft) and STA with a time of 6'35"). During the Outdoor World Championship in Ischia, organised by the Italian Federation of Sport Fishing and Underwater Activities, she won three gold medals with relative world records: in constant weight with monofin (CWT) with −93 m (−305 ft), in constant weight without tools (CNF) with −58 m (−190 ft) and in jump blue (JB) with 190 m (620 ft). Once again, in June 2016 in Lignano Sabbiadoro, during the CMAS Indoor World Championships: three golds and three CMAS world records with 171 m (561 ft) in dynamics without fins, 204 m (669 ft) in dynamics with fins (DYNBP) and 250 m (820 ft) in dynamics with monofin (DYN).

In 2017, the Italian began her outdoor training with international coach and safety diver Stephen Keenan and beat the AIDA world record with −104 m (−341 ft) depth in the Vertical Blue competition on 10 May on Long Island in the Bahamas. During the last days of the competition, Natalia Molchanova's record in constant weight (CWT) of −101 m (−331 ft) (which had been held for six years), was beaten three times. On 6 May, Zecchini was the first to go down and take off the tag at −102 m (−335 ft); breaking the world record. Four days later, Hanako Hirose dropped to −103 m (−338 ft) but minutes later she went on to detach the tag at −104 m (−341 ft), setting another world record.

Stephen Keenan died in July 2017 during a recreational dive across The Arch of the Blue Hole with Alessia. It was not regarded as a dive that would push Zecchini to her limits, but an accumulation of mistakes and difficulties during the attempt would lead to disaster. Safety diver Lily Crespy, who was on duty that day, later gave a detailed summary of events. The official AIDA report stated that reasonable precautions had been taken; however, it noted that there was no on-site specialist doctor, insufficient medical equipment, no safety boat, and no ambulance on stand-by at the dive site. Zecchini was experienced in open waters, was familiar with the Blue Hole, and wanted to tackle it without fins rather than with the usual, more powerful mono-fin. As her safety, Keenan agreed to meet her at −50 m (−160 ft), though the standard limit for safety divers is −30 m (−98 ft). However, for reasons unknown, he decided to dive in 20 seconds later than pre-planned, to be seen by her with the ascending rope at the exit of the tunnel. This caused Alessia, already successfully outside the tunnel and with breath to spare, to swim astray in search of her way up. When Stephen spotted Alessia, he strived to help her to re-surface, giving his own life for hers.

In 2017 she also participated in the CMAS European Indoor Championship in Cagliari swimming pool where she won three medals out of the three competitions (first place in DYN, second in DNF and second in DYNBP). In August of the same year, she participated in the AIDA World Championships in Roatan where she became world champion in free-immersion setting a new Italian record at −88 m (−289 ft) and vice world champion in constant weight with monofin with −98 m (−322 ft). A disqualification denied her the silver medal even in constant weight without fins. In October, at the CMAS European Championship in Kaş, Turkey, she won two silver medals in CWT and CNF with −93 m (−305 ft) and −63 m (−207 ft), a new Italian record. Also in the same year, during the Dungoncup in Milazzo, Sicily, she achieved the world record in dynamic apnea without fins with 181 m (594 ft).

Zecchini then came under the guidance of Martin Zajac, which lasted until the conclusion of the 2018 competition season. In 2018, Zecchini set the new AIDA world record in constant weight (CWT) on 10 May in San Andrès in Colombia in the Nirvana Oceanquest Freediving Competition. A month later, at the Indoor World Championships in Lignano Sabbiadoro, Italy, she won two silver medals in DYN and DNF and a gold medal in the bi-fin discipline where she set the new world record with 221 m (725 ft). In July, in Long Island, in the prestigious Vertical Blue competition, she confirmed herself as the strongest freediver by winning overall and setting four world records AIDA in all depth disciplines: – Constant weight without fins with −73 m (−240 ft), Free immersion with −93 m (−305 ft) and then −96 m (−315 ft) and Constant weight with monofin with −107 m (−351 ft). In September of the same year, she participated in the Dugoncup Outdoor in Milazzo setting two other world records in CWT (−101 m (−331 ft)) and FIM (−89 m (−292 ft)) but this time under the aegis of CMAS, before flying to the first edition of the Molchanova Gran Prix in memory of Natalia Molchanova, winning the competition. She participated in the CMAS Outdoor World Championship by winning three golds in the three competitions held, CWT, CNF and FIM where she set four CMAS world records, bringing the WR in constant weight with CMAS and AIDA to the same depth of −107 m (−351 ft).

In April 2019, during the Dungoncup in Milazzo, she again set the world record in dynamic free diving without fins with 193 m (633 ft). In June 2019, she participated, together with the Italian National team, in the CMAS Indoor European Championship in Istanbul, winning two gold medals with relative world records, 228 m (748 ft) in dynamics with fins and 253 m (830 ft) with monofin, and a silver medal in dynamics without fins. On 7 August 2019, during the CMAS Outdoor World Championship in Roatan, Honduras, at a depth of −113 m (−371 ft), she set the new world record in constant weight freediving with monofin at the same time as Slovenian Alenka Artnik. During this event, she won three gold medals in CWT, CNF and FIM and set four world records during the competition and the competition that preceded it, the Caribbean Cup 2019.

During the Nirvana Oceanquest 2019 event in Curaçao, she set two world records in the discipline of free immersion under the aegis of AIDA with −98 m (−322 ft) on 16 October 2019. Two days later, with −100 m (−330 ft) approved by CMAS, she became the first woman to touch this depth using only her arms.

In July 2021, Zecchini participated in the Vertical Blue on Long Island, Bahamas, winning the overall again and setting three CMAS World Records: −115 m (−377 ft) CWT, −74 m (−243 ft) CNF, and −101 m (−331 ft) FIM.

In October, she took part in the CMAS Outdoor World Championship 2021, in Kaş, Turkey, winning a gold medal in CNF and one silver medal in CWTB. During the "CMAS TSSF Kaş Baska Freediving WC (competition before the world championship), she set a new world record in her first competition in CWTB with the depth of −105 m (−344 ft), 10 m (33 ft) more than the previous record.

In October 2022, during the CMAS Outdoor World Championship 2021 in Kaş, she won a silver medal with −109 m (−358 ft) in CWT.

On 27th March 2023, during the Secretblue Competition in Moalboal, Philippines, she set a new world record in CWTB with −107 m (−351 ft). After two days, she went deeper and set a new world record with −109 m (−358 ft) in 3'36".

On 24 May 2023 she became again the deepest woman in the world, setting the WR in constant weight with monofin to -123m, during the AIDA Oceanquest Competition in Camotes Island, Philippines.

== Honors ==
Asteroid 300124 Alessiazecchini, discovered by Italian amateur astronomer Silvano Casulli in 2006, was named in her honor. The official citation was published by IAU's Working Group for Small Bodies Nomenclature on 21 March 2022.

== Accomplishments ==
Medals won, beginning from the first international competition in Kazan' in 2013:

Year	Place	Competition	Discipline			
2023	Camotes Islands (Philippines)	AIDA Oceanquest	Constant Weight with monofin	senza cornice	-123 m	WR AIDA
2023	Moalboal (Philippines)	Secret Blue Competition	Constant Weight with bifins	senza cornice	-109 m	WR AIDA
2023	Moalboal (Philippines)	Secret Blue Competition	Constant Weight with bifins	senza cornice	-107 m	WR AIDA
2022	Kaş (Turkey)	Outdoor World Championship	Constant Weight with Monofin	senza cornice	-109 m	
2021	Kaş (Turkey)	Outdoor World Championship	Constant Weight with Bifins	senza cornice	-98 m	
2021	Kaş (Turkey)	Outdoor World Championship	Constant Weight without Fins	senza cornice	-69 m	
2021	Long Island (The Bahamas)	Vertical Blue	Freeimmersion	senza cornice	-101 m	WR CMAS
2021	Long Island (The Bahamas)	Vertical Blue	Constant Weight without Fins	senza cornice	-74 m	WR CMAS
2021	Long Island (The Bahamas)	Vertical Blue	Constant Weight with Monofin	senza cornice	-115 m	NR CMAS
2019	Curaçao (Netherlands)	Nirvana Oceanquest	Freeimmersion	senza cornice	−100 m	WR CMAS
2019	Curaçao (Netherlands)	Nirvana Oceanquest	Freeimmersion	senza cornice	−98 m	WR AIDA
2019	Roatan (Honduras)	Outdoor World Championship	Freeimmersion	senza cornice	−92 m	
2019	Roatan (Honduras)	Outdoor World Championship	Constant Weight with Monofin	senza cornice	−113 m	WR CMAS
2019	Roatan (Honduras)	Outdoor World Championship	Constant Weight without Fins	senza cornice	−72 m	
2019	Roatan (Honduras)	Caribbean Cup	Constant Weight with Monofin	senza cornice	−112 m	WR CMAS
2019	Roatan (Honduras)	Caribbean Cup	Constant Weight without Fins	senza cornice	−73 m	WR CMAS
2019	Istanbul (Turkey)	European Championship Indoor	Dynamic with Monofin	senza cornice	253 m	WR CMAS
2019	Istanbul (Turkey)	European Championship Indoor	Dynamic with Bifins	senza cornice	228 m	WR CMAS
2019	Istanbul (Turkey)	European Championship Indoor	Dynamic without fins	senza cornice	179 m	
2019	Milazzo (Italy)	Dugoncup	Dynamic without fins	senza cornice	193 m	WR CMAS
2018	Kaş (Turkey)	Outdoor World Championship	Freeimmersion	senza cornice	−94 m	WR CMAS
2018	Kaş (Turkey)	Outdoor World Championship	Constant Weight with Monofin	senza cornice	−107 m	WR CMAS
2018	Kaş (Turkey)	Outdoor World Championship	Constant Weight without Fins	senza cornice	−70 m	WR CMAS
2018	Ibiza (Spain)	Molchanova Gran Prix	Constant Weight without Fins	senza cornice	−69 m	
2018	Ibiza (Spain)	Molchanova Gran Prix	Constant Weight with Monofin	senza cornice	−100 m	
2018	Milazzo (Italy)	Dugoncup	Constant Weight with Monofin	senza cornice	−101 m	WR CMAS
2018	Milazzo (Italy)	Dugoncup	Freeimmersion	senza cornice	−89 m	WR CMAS
2018	Lignano Sabbiadoro (Italy)	Indoor World Championship	Dynamic with Bifins	senza cornice	221 m	WR CMAS
2018	Lignano Sabbiadoro (Italy)	Indoor World Championship	Dynamic with Monofin	senza cornice	227 m	
2018	Lignano Sabbiadoro (Italy)	Indoor World Championship	Dynamic without fins	senza cornice	163 m	
2018	Long Island (The Bahamas)	Vertical Blue	Constant Weight with Monofin	senza cornice	−107 m	WR AIDA
2018	Long Island (The Bahamas)	Vertical Blue	Constant Weight without Fins	senza cornice	−73 m	WR AIDA
2018	Long Island (The Bahamas)	Vertical Blue	Freeimmersion	senza cornice	−96 m	WR AIDA
2018	Long Island (The Bahamas)	Vertical Blue	Freeimmersion	senza cornice	−93 m	WR AIDA
2018	San Andrès (Colombia)	Nirvana Oceanquest	Constant Weight with Monofin	senza cornice	−105 m	WR AIDA
2017	Kaş (Turkey)	Outdoor European Championship	Constant Weight with Monofin	senza cornice	−93 m	
2017	Kaş (Turkey)	Outdoor European Championship	Constant Weight without Fins	senza cornice	−63 m	
2017	Roatan (Honduras)	Outdoor World Championship	Freeimmersion	senza cornice	−88 m	NR AIDA
2017	Roatan (Honduras)	Outdoor World Championship	Constant Weight with Monofin	senza cornice	−98 m	
2017	Cagliari (Italy)	Indoor European Championship	Dynamic with Bifins	senza cornice	194 m	
2017	Cagliari (Italy)	Indoor European Championship	Dynamic without fins	senza cornice	157 m	
2017	Cagliari (Italy)	Indoor European Championship	Dynamic with Monofin	senza cornice	232 m	
2017	Long Island (The Bahamas)	Vertical Blue	Constant Weight with Monofin	senza cornice	−104 m	WR AIDA
2017	Long Island (The Bahamas)	Vertical Blue	Constant Weight with Monofin	senza cornice	−102 m	WR AIDA
2017	Milazzo (Italy)	Dugoncup	Dynamic without fins	senza cornice	181 m	WR CMAS
2016	Lignano Sabbiadoro (Italy)	Indoor World Championship	Dynamic with Monofin	senza cornice	250 m	WR CMAS
2016	Lignano Sabbiadoro (Italy)	Indoor World Championship	Dynamic with Bifins	senza cornice	204 m	WR CMAS
2016	Lignano Sabbiadoro (Italy)	Indoor World Championship	Dynamic without fins	senza cornice	171 m	WR CMAS
2015	Ischia (Italy)	Outdoor World Championship	Constant Weight without Fins	senza cornice	−58 m	WR CMAS
2015	Ischia (Italy)	Outdoor World Championship	Constant Weight with Monofin	senza cornice	−93 m	WR CMAS
2015	Ischia (Italy)	Outdoor World Championship	Jump Blue	senza cornice	190 m	WR CMAS
2015	Mulhouse (France)	Indoor World Championship	Dynamic with Monofin	senza cornice	234 m	
2015	Mulhouse (France)	Indoor World Championship	Static	senza cornice	6'34"	
2015	Mulhouse (France)	Indoor World Championship	Dynamic without fins	senza cornice	165 m	WR CMAS
2014	Ischia (Italy)	Outdoor Italian Championship	Constant Weight with Monofin	senza cornice	−86 m	WR CMAS
2014	Tenerife (Spain)	European Championship	Dynamic with Monofin	senza cornice	218 m	
2014	Tenerife (Spain)	European Championship	Static	senza cornice	6'08"	
2014	Cagliari (Italy)	Team World Championship AIDA	Static	senza cornice	6'39"	NR AIDA
2014	Cagliari (Italy)	Team World Championship AIDA	Dynamic with Monofin	senza cornice	223 m	
2014	Cagliari (Italy)	Team World Championship AIDA	Constant Weight with Monofin	senza cornice	84 m	NR AIDA
2013	Ischia (Italy)	Outdoor Italian Championship	Constant Weight with Monofin	senza cornice	−81 m	WR CMAS
2013	Kazan' (Russia)	Indoor World Championship	Static	senza cornice	6'23"	WR CMAS
2013	Kazan' (Russia)	Indoor World Championship	Dynamic without fins	senza cornice		
2013	Kazan' (Russia)	Indoor World Championship	Dynamic with Monofin	senza cornice		

World Records:

During her career she set 38 World Records in the indoor and outdoor disciplines of freediving, 27 homologated by CMAS CMAS and 11 by AIDA.

CMAS HOMOLOGATION
N	Discipline	Performance	Date	Place
1	CWT	−81 m	04/10/2013	Ischia (Italy)
2	CWT	−86 m	04/10/2014	Ischia (Italy)
3	DNF	165 m	27/07/2015	Mulhouse (France)
4	JB	190 m	09/10/2015	Ischia (Italy)
5	CWT	−93 m	06/10/2015	Ischia (Italy)
6	CNF	−58 m	08/10/2015	Ischia (Italy)
7	DNF	171 m	08/06/2016	Lignano Sabbiadoro (Italy)
8	DYNBP	204 m	10/06/2016	Lignano Sabbiadoro (Italy)
9	DYN	250 m	11/06/2016	Lignano Sabbiadoro (Italy)
10	DNF	181 m	11/03/2017	Milazzo (Italy)
11	DYNBP	221 m	15/06/2018	Lignano Sabbiadoro (Italy)
12	FIM	−89 m	01/09/2018	Milazzo (Italy)
13	CWT	−101 m	02/09/2018	Milazzo (Italy)
14	CNF	−70 m	03/10/2018	Kaş (Turkey)
15	CWT	−107 m	02/10/2018	Kaş (Turkey)
16	FIM	−94 m	06/10/2018	Kaş (Turkey)
17	DNF	193 m	06/04/2019	Milazzo (Italy)
18	DYNBP	228 m	21/06/2019	Istanbul (Turkey)
19	DYN	253 m	22/06/2019	Istanbul (Turkey)
20	CNF	−73 m	03/08/2019	Roatan (Honduras)
21	CWT	−112 m	05/08/2019	Roatan (Honduras)
22	CWT	−113 m	08/08/2019	Roatan (Honduras)
23	FIM	−100 m	18/10/2019	Curaçao (Netherlands)
24	CWT	-115 m	13/07/2021	Long Island (The Bahamas)
25	CNF	-74 m	15/07/2021	Long Island (The Bahamas)
26	FIM	-101 m	17/07/2021	Long Island (The Bahamas)
27	CWTB	-105 m	30/09/2021	Kaş (Turkey)

AIDA HOMOLOGATION
N	Disciplina	Performance	Data	Luogo
1	CWT	−102 m	06/05/2017	Long Island (The Bahamas)
2	CWT	−104 m	10/05/2017	Long Island (The Bahamas)
3	CWT	−105 m	04/05/2018	San Andrès (Colombia)
4	FIM	−93 m	16/07/2018	Long Island (The Bahamas)
5	CNF	−73 m	22/07/2018	Long Island (The Bahamas)
6	FIM	−96 m	24/07/2018	Long Island (The Bahamas)
7	CWT	−107 m	26/07/2018	Long Island (The Bahamas)
8	FIM	−98 m	16/10/2019	Curaçao (Netherlands)
9	CWTB	107 m	27/03/2023	Moalboal (Philippines)
10	CWTB	109 m	29/03/2023	Moalboal (Philippines)
11	CWT	123 m	24/05/2023	Camotes Islands (Philippines)

Clarification:

- STA = Static Apnea – Holding the breath as long as possible.
- DYN = Dynamic Apnea with monofin – Diving as far as possible with the use of a monofin.
- DYNB = Dynamic Apnea with fins – Diving as far as possible with the use of fins.
- DNF = Dynamic Apnea without fins – Diving as far as possible without fins.
- CWT = Constant weight with monofin – Diving as deep as possible with the use of a monofin.
- CWTB = Constant weight with fins – Diving as deep as possible with the use of fins.
- CNF = Constant weight without fins – Diving as deep as possible without fins.
- FIM = Free Immersion – Diving as deep as possible by pulling down and up the rope.

== Media ==
Zecchini is a focus of The Deepest Breath, a 2023 documentary.
