= Salda, Burdur =

Salda
- Village
- Location within Turkey
- Coordinates: 37°32′N 29°38′E
- Country: Turkey
- Province: Burdur
- District: Yeşilova
- Elevation: 1,170 m (3,840 ft)
- Population (2021): 1,083
- Time zone: UTC+3 (TRT)
- Postal code: 15515
- Area code: 0248

Salda is a village in Yeşilova District of Burdur Province, Turkey. Its population is 1,083 (2021). Before the 2013 reorganisation, it was a town (belde). It is situated on the coast of Lake Salda. Both the town and the lake are named after Salda creek at the south of the town. Salda is 12 kilometres (7.5 mi) west of Yeşilova, and 70 kilometres (43 mi) west of Burdur.
