= Kosho Loïc Vuillemin =

Swiss Freediver and Zen Master

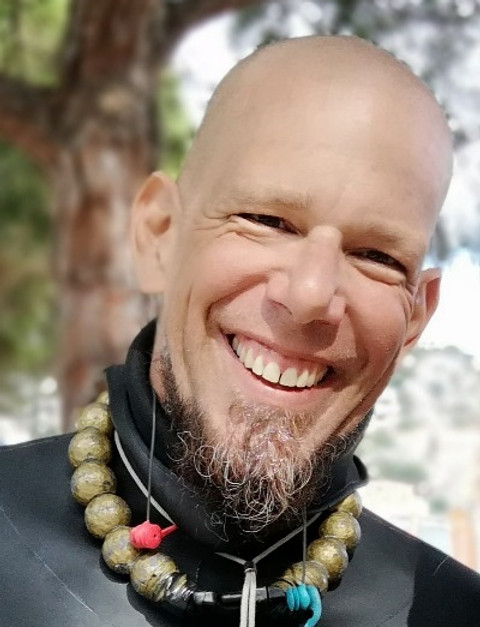

Personal information
- Nickname: The Deepest Monk
- Nationality: Swiss
- Born: 29 September 1976 (age 49)
- Education: Master of Science, Soto Zen Master (84th patriarch of transmitted buddhism), AIDA Freediving Instructor Trainer, Pro Safety Freediver
- Occupations: Zen Master, Freediver, Public Speaker
- Height: 200 cm (6 ft 7 in)
- Children: Mahatma Vuillemin (daughter)
- Parents: Vincent Keisen Vuillemin (father); Mireille Vuillemin (mother)
- Website: https://deepzen.net

Sport
- Sport: Freediving
- Rank: Swiss Record Holder (FIM 93m | CWTB 94m | CWT 101m)
- Coached by: Stephen Keenan, Andrea Zuccari

Achievements and titles
- Highest world ranking: 1rst AIDA depth overall in 2020

Kosho Loïc Vuillemin (born 29 September 1976), often known as the Diving Monk or the Deepest Monk", is a Swiss athlete, multiple national record holder in depth disciplines of freediving. He is also a Sōtō Zen Master, holder of the Dharma transmission (shihō) of Taigen Kosen Roshi, which makes of him the 84th successor of Buddha Shakyamuni in the Buddhist tradition.

Vuillemin is the first Swiss freediver and buddhist monk to reach the depth of 100m without mechanical assistance during competition and on a single breath. In 2020 he was ranked first on the depth overall of AIDA International and scored 5th place overall during the World Championship of 2024 in Corsica. He won multiple times the Freediving World Cup in Sharm El Sheikh.

== Biography ==
Vuillemin, born in the US, was raised in Switzerland in the town of Trélex, in the Canton de Vaud. He went to high school in the Gymnase de Nyon and later studied Molecular biology in the University of Geneva (2002). Ordained Zen monk at age 20, he abandoned his PhD and left Geneva to join Master Kosen Roshi in Montpellier, hoping to be taken as disciple. After more than a year of homelessness, Vuillemin finally got taken as Stephane Kosen Thibaut's secretary and personal assistant in November 2005. Together with the help of the Kosen Sangha Community they founded the Yujo Nyusanji temple in the South of France. Vuillemin took care of the place as the main guardian until he left in September 2017.

Vuillemin did his first competition in Dahab in October 2018 and scored his first national record in CWTB in 2019. By 2026 Vuillemin has scored multiple national records for Switzerland, won various international competitions and registered an impressive palmares.

Instructor trainer for AIDA International, he works as a full-time freediving instructor in his school of Sharm El Sheikh. As a public speaker, he often travels to Switzerland to hold conferences and workshops in public and private organizations.

=== Ordination and monastic life ===
From a very young age Vuillemin has been pulled towards Zen practice in company of his father, the Zen monk Vincent Keisen Vuillemin.

He got introduced to Kosen Roshi with whom he practiced few retreats before to wish to receive the Bodhisattva ordination. He received the first ordination and the name Kosho in 1997. One year later, he then wished to receive the monk ordination formally, asking Master Kosen to take him as his disciple. Kosen consented to make him a monk yet sent him back to the university asking him to get a degree before to envision a Zen career.

Loïc stayed in Geneva and practiced in Ryu Kai Dojo Zen while studying Molecular Biology until he got his Master's degree in 2002. After leaving his Phd, he decided to join Master Kosen in Montpellier and assist him in his mission. He formally got taken as prime disciple in November 2005. From this moment Loïc stayed by the side of Master Kosen Roshi until he got asked to take in charge the development of their new bought temple, Yujo Nyusanji, in July 2009.

From there, it took 4 years to Vuillemin to obtain the Dharma transmission of his master and two more to receive the official allowances to open Yujo Nyusanji to the public. He stayed in charge two more years before to leave and walk his own path.

=== Freediving ===
Impressed by the movie "The Big Blue" of Luc Besson, Vuillemin dreamt of freediving his whole life. It is only in 2014 that he discovers AIDA Freediving courses and got registered for an AIDA 2 course with instructor trainer Julien Borde in Mexico. He did the level 3 in Ibiza in 2015 with Louisa Collyns who advised him to continue his freediving training with the guidance of Stephen Keenan. He got certified AIDA 4 in 2016 and Instructor in early 2017.

This same year Vuillemin participated in his first freediving competition The Red C cup in Dahab. His scores stayed modest until he registered his first national record for Switzerland in April 2019. Stimulated by this record Vuillemin decides to conquer the ones of other depth disciplines.

From 2019 until 2026 Vuillemin has registered 25 national records in the disciplines of Free Immersion (FIM), Constant Weight (CWT) and Constant Weight Bifins (CWTB). In 2022 he is the first Swiss freediver to reach the iconic depth of 100 meters in CWT. He will dive 101 meters two years later.

Before announcing a break, Vuillemin has stood on multiple podiums of international and national competitions, scored into the top ten of both World Championships he went to and never suffered any black outs.

== Competition Palmares ==
National Records (Switzerland)
Category	Depth	Date	Competition
CWTB	62 m	05 April 2019	Blue Ocean Mini Comp
FIM	84 m	27 July 2019	AIDA Blue Ocean Depth Comp
CWTB	76 m	3 November 2019	AIDA Egyptian National Championships
CWT	84 m	5 November 2019	AIDA Egyptian National Championship
CWTB	80 m	22 September 2020	AIDA Freediving World Competition
CWT	85 m	25 September 2020	AIDA Freediving World Competition
FIM	85 m	18 October 2020	AIDA Dahab Apnea October Competition
CWTB	83 m	22 October 2020	AIDA Dahab Apnea October Competition
CWTB	85 m	11 May 2021	AIDA Freediving World Cup
FIM	86 m	12 May 2021	AIDA Freediving World Cup
CWT	86 m	14 May 2021	AIDA Freediving World Cup
CWTB	86 m	14 July 2021	AIDA Freediving World Cup
CWT	88 m	16 November 2021	AIDA Freediving World Cup
CWT	90 m	18 November 2021	AIDA Freediving World Cup
CWT	93 m	17 May 2022	AIDA Freediving World Cup - May 2022
CWT	96 m	19 May 2022	AIDA Freediving World Cup - May 2022
CWT	100 m	22 May 2022	AIDA Freediving World Cup - May 2022
CWTB	86 m	15 May 2023	AIDA Freediving World Cup - May 2023
FIM	87 m	16 May 2023	AIDA Freediving World Cup - May 2023
FIM	90 m	16 May 2024	AIDA Freediving World Cup May
CWTB	90 m	17 May 2024	AIDA Freediving World Cup May
CWT	101 m	19 May 2024	AIDA Freediving World Cup May
FIM	93 m	22 May 2024	AIDA Freediving World Cup May
CWTB	93 m	23 May 2024	AIDA Freediving World Cup May
CWTB	94 m	12 May 2026	AIDA Freediving World Cup May Competition

International Competition Overall Podiums
Medal	Date	Competition
Gold	26 September 2020	AIDA Freediving World Competition
Silver	22 October 2020	AIDA Dahab Apnea October Competition
Gold	15 May 2021	AIDA Freediving World Cup
Gold	15 July 2021	AIDA Freediving World Cup
Gold	10 October 2021	AIDA Freediving World Cup
Bronze	22 November 2021	AIDA Freediving World Cup
Gold	22 November 2021	AIDA Freediving World Cup (Final)
Silver	22 May 2023	AIDA Freediving World Cup - May 2023
Bronze	23 May 2024	AIDA Freediving World Cup - May
Silver	8 August 2024	AIDA Cormorant Depth Challenge (August Edition)
Gold	26 May 2025	AIDA Freediving World Cup
Gold	19 May 2026	AIDA Freediving World Cup - May Competition

International Competition Podiums
Medal	Discipline	Date	Competition
Silver	STA	25 October 2017	Red C Cup 9th Edition
Silver	CWTB	5 April 2019	Blue Ocean Mini Comp
Gold	FIM	26 July 2019	AIDA Blue Ocean Depth Comp
Bronze	CWTB	3 November 2019	AIDA Egyptian National Championships
Silver	CWT	5 November 2019	AIDA Egyptian National Championships
Bronze	CWTB	22 September 2020	AIDA Freediving World Competition
Bronze	FIM	23 September 2020	AIDA Freediving World Competition
Silver	CWT	25 September 2020	AIDA Freediving World Competition
Bronze	CNF	26 September 2020	AIDA Freediving World Competition
Silver	FIM	18 October 2020	AIDA Dahab Apnea October Competition
Gold	CWTB	22 October 2020	AIDA Dahab Apnea October Competition
Bronze	CWT	11 July 2021	AIDA Freediving World Cup
Silver	CWTB	14 July 2021	AIDA Freediving World Cup
Silver	CNF	15 July 2021	AIDA Freediving World Cup
Silver	CWTB	6 October 2021	AIDA Freediving World Cup
Silver	FIM	7 October 2021	AIDA Freediving World Cup
Bronze	CWT	9 October 2021	AIDA Freediving World Cup
Gold	CNF	10 October 2021	AIDA Freediving World Cup
Bronze	CWT	18 November 2021	AIDA Freediving World Cup
Gold	CWT	22 May 2022	AIDA Freediving World Cup - May 2022
Bronze	CWT	19 May 2023	AIDA Freediving World Cup - May 2023
Bronze	CNF	22 May 2023	AIDA Freediving World Cup - May 2023
Bronze	FIM	22 May 2024	AIDA Freediving World Cup - May
Silver	CWTB	23 May 2024	AIDA Freediving World Cup - May
Silver	CWTB	15 August 2024	AIDA Cormorant Depth Challenge (August Edition)
Bronze	CNF	18 August 2024	AIDA Cormorant Depth Challenge (August Edition)
Bronze	FIM	22 May 2025	AIDA Freediving World Cup
Gold	CWTB	24 MAy 2025	AIDA Freediving World Cup
Silver	CNF	26 May 2025	AIDA Freediving World Cup
Gold	CWTB	12 May 2026	AIDA Freediving World Cup - May Competition
Silver	FIM	15 May 2026	AIDA Freediving World Cup - May Competition
Silver	CNF	18 May 2026	AIDA Freediving World Cup - May Competition
Gold	CWT	19 May 2026	AIDA Freediving World Cup - May Competition

Swiss National Competition Overall Podiums
Medal	Date	Competition
Silver	20 August 2022	AIDA Swiss Freediving Championship 2022 - Depth Competition

Swiss National Competition Podiums
Medal	Discipline	Date	Competition
Silver	CWTB	24 August 2019	Swiss Championship Lake 2019
Bronze	CTW	20 August 2022	AIDA Swiss Freediving Championship - Depth Competition
Silver	FIM	20 August 2022	AIDA Swiss Freediving Championship - Depth Competition
