= Stephen Keenan =

Irish safety freediver (1977-2017)

- Born: 1 December 1977; Glasnevin, Ireland
- Died: 22 July 2017 (aged 39); Dahab, Egypt
- Education: Trinity College
- Known for: Safety diver

Stephen Keenan (1 December 1977 – 22 July 2017) was an Irish freediving safety diver and co-owner at Dahab Freedivers. He held several Irish national freediving records and was a Chief of Safety at various freediving events such as Vertical Blue Freediving Competitions.

Keenan died during a rescue in an attempt to assist freediver Alessia Zecchini to the surface from a depth of 50 metres in Dahab's Blue Hole in 2017. It was the first recorded death of a safety diver in action in freediving history. Before this he had successfully rescued Alexey Molchanov from a depth of 40 metres while putting himself in mortal danger and was regarded by many as the best safety diver in the world.

== Biography ==
Stephen Keenan was born and raised in Glasnevin, near Dublin, Ireland. He had studied microbiology at Trinity College, but had lived for about eight years in Egypt, where he was a freedive instructor.

Keenan discovered freediving while he was holidaying in Dahab, Egypt in 2009. He later relocated to Dahab, became a freediving instructor, and trained hundreds of students in Egypt, Spain, and the Philippines. In 2015, Keenan co-founded Dahab Freedivers with fellow freedivers Miguel Lozano and Pascal Berger. That same year, he attained his career-best dive with a monofin to 81 metres (267 feet).

== Death ==
On 22 July 2017, Keenan died while assisting a dive by Alessia Zecchini. Zecchini was attempting to cross the Blue Hole on a single breath, but became disorientated when Keenan was 20 seconds late to arrive at a meeting point. She swam astray but reached the surface after Keenan reached her to resume guiding. Keenan, though, lost consciousness and was found floating face down nearby. Despite repeated attempts to save his life, he could not be revived.

According to the Irish Independent, "Keenan suffered an in-water blackout in the last 10 meters of the ascent. He was alive when he was recovered from the water but died a short time later."

== The Deepest Breath ==
The Deepest Breath is a 2023 documentary directed by Laura McGann. The film tells the story of Alessia Zecchini and Keenan, covering their relationship, careers in the sport, and Keenan's death.
