= Centre for Sinai =

- Founded: 1998
- Founder: Ahmed El-Sadek; Ezzat Abdelmaguid
- Type: Non-profit
- Location: Dahab, South Sinai (Egypt)
- Region served: Sinai Peninsula
- Website: Official website

The Centre for Sinai is a non-profit, non-governmental organization created in 1998 to highlight and preserve the culture and history of the Sinai Peninsula. Based in South Sinai, Egypt, the centre also aims to preserve the Bedouin way of life, so that the culture does not disappear like other cultures in the past. Centre for Sinai has a small library and also displays items of Bedouin culture such as jewelry, dress, utensils, and weapons.

The centre offers expeditions into the desert by camel or mountain bike. The organization is also committed to cleaning up the Sinai and keeping it that way.
