= Çeltek, Yeşilova =

Village in Turkey

Çeltek
- Village
- Location in Turkey
- Coordinates: 37.5266°N 29.9044°E
- Country: Turkey
- Province: Burdur
- District: Yeşilova
- Population (2021): 214
- Time zone: UTC+3 (TRT)

Çeltek is a village in the Yeşilova District of Burdur Province in Turkey. Its population is 214 (2021).
