= Yarışlı, Yeşilova =

Village in Turkey

Yarışlı
- Village
- Country: Turkey
- Province: Burdur
- District: Yeşilova
- Population (2021): 535
- Time zone: UTC+3 (TRT)

Yarışlı is a village in the Yeşilova District of Burdur Province in Turkey. Its population is 535 (2021).
