= Çaltepe, Yeşilova =

Village in Turkey

Çaltepe
- Village
- Location in Turkey
- Coordinates: 37°27′01″N 29°48′02″E
- Country: Turkey
- Province: Burdur
- District: Yeşilova
- Population (2021): 435
- Time zone: UTC+3 (TRT)

Çaltepe is a village in the Yeşilova District of Burdur Province in Turkey. Its population is 435 (2021).
