= Armutköy, Yeşilova =

Village in Turkey

Armutköy
- Village
- Location in Turkey
- Coordinates: 37.7272°N 29.8969°E
- Country: Turkey
- Province: Burdur
- District: Yeşilova
- Population (2021): 192
- Time zone: UTC+3 (TRT)

Armutköy (also: Armut) is a village in the Yeşilova District of Burdur Province in Turkey. Its population is 192 (2021).
