= Akçaköy, Yeşilova =

Village in Turkey

Akçaköy
- Village
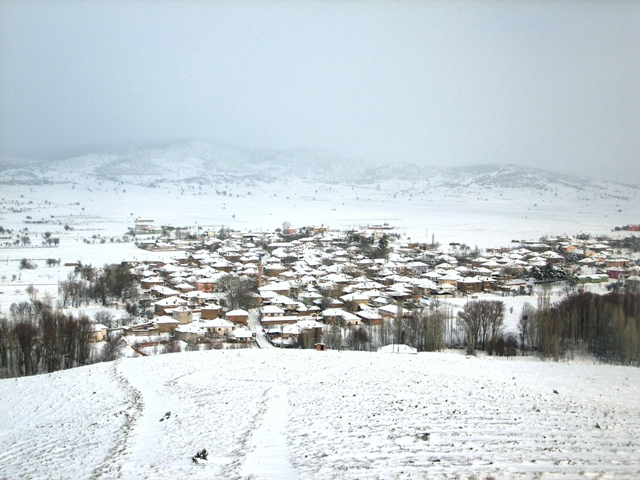

- Location within Turkey
- Coordinates: 37.7082°N 29.8990°E
- Country: Turkey
- Province: Burdur
- District: Yeşilova
- Population (2021): 243
- Time zone: UTC+3 (TRT)

Akçaköy is a village in the Yeşilova District of Burdur Province in Turkey. Its population is 243 (2021).
