= Beyköy, Yeşilova =

Village in Turkey

Beyköy
- Village
- Location in Turkey
- Coordinates: 37.6556°N 29.8468°E
- Country: Turkey
- Province: Burdur
- District: Yeşilova
- Population (2021): 24
- Time zone: UTC+3 (TRT)

Beyköy is a village in the Yeşilova District of Burdur Province in Turkey. Its population is 24 (2021).
