= Derya Can =

Turkish world record holder female free-diver

Derya Can Göçen
- Born: Derya Can; October 12, 1979 (age 47); Çanakkale, Turkey
- Education: Çanakkale Onsekiz Mart University
- Occupations: Free-diver, teacher
- Spouse: Tayfun Göçen
- Children: 2

Derya Can Göçen (born Derya Can on October 12, 1979) is a Turkish world record holder female free-diver and school teacher.

== Family life ==
Derya Can was born in Çanakkale, Turkey on October 12, 1979. She studied physical education and sports at Çanakkale Onsekiz Mart University graduating in 2001. She has been working as a teacher since 2009.

She is married to Tayfun Göçen, who is chief diver of a search and rescue team at the Turkish Coast Guard, and also a free-diver. She is a mother of two children, a 2011-born son Poyraz Mustafa and a daughter Derin Helen born in 2015. The family lives in Canakkale.

== Sporting career ==
She began performing sport already in primary school years. After achieving regional success in athletics, she switched over to taekwondo in the high school. She was called up to the national team camp for the 2000 Summer Olympics after her success as the runners-up at the Turkish championships. However, she had to hang up her boots after sustaining an injury on her knee.

Performing scuba diving since her age of fifteen, she was inspired for freediving in 2002 by her cousin, who was a former free-diver. She was admitted to the Turkey national team already in 2003.

Can Göçen holds many titles in diverse freediving disciplines at national, continental and world level competitions. She was the world record holder in the jump blue apnea with fins (JB) discipline in 2008 with 128.49 m (421.6 ft). In 2013, she set a world record in the constant weight without fins at sea (CWT) discipline with 71 m (233 ft). She improved her own world record from 2013 to 90.20 m (295.9 ft) in 2:29 minutes off Kaş, Antalya, Turkey on July 20, 2014. Can Göçen set a national record in the CWT discipline, which was held by Şahika Ercümen, improving it to a depth of 77 m (253 ft) on September 2, 2016. She placed third in the CWT discipline with 78 m (256 ft) in 2:02 minutes at the CMAS 2nd Apnea World Championship Outdoor held at Kaş, Turkey on October 4, 2016. Her achievement was a national record at the same time. On December 16, 2016, she set a CMAS-recognized world record in the variable weight apnea without fins at sea (VNF) diving in Kaş to a depth of 94 m (308 ft) in 2:38 min. Former record belonged to Şahika Ercümen with 91 m (299 ft). On February 25, 2017, she set a new CMAS-approved world record diving a distance of 120 m (390 ft) under the ice layer at the frozen lake Weissensee in Austria.

She is a member of the Middle East Technical University's underwater sports club ODTÜ SAS. She admits that she is afraid of the deep blue sea, however, continues with free-diving, which helps overcome her fear.

== World records ==
- JB 128.49 m (421.6 ft) – 2008
- CWT 71 m (233 ft) – 2013
- CWT 90.20 m (295.9 ft) – July 20, 2014 in Kaş, Antalya, Turkey
- VNF 94 m (308 ft) – December 16, 2016 in Kaş
- Distance diving under ice 120 m (390 ft) – Weissensee, Austria
