= Büyükyaka, Yeşilova =

Village in Turkey

Büyükyaka
- Village
- Location in Turkey
- Coordinates: 37°39′N 29°55′E
- Country: Turkey
- Province: Burdur
- District: Yeşilova
- Population (2021): 269
- Time zone: UTC+3 (TRT)

Büyükyaka is a village in the Yeşilova District of Burdur Province in Turkey. Its population is 269 (2021).
