= Elden, Yeşilova =

Village in Turkey

Elden
- Village
- Location in Turkey
- Coordinates: 37.7437°N 29.9509°E
- Country: Turkey
- Province: Burdur
- District: Yeşilova
- Population (2021): 80
- Time zone: UTC+3 (TRT)

Elden is a village in the Yeşilova District of Burdur Province in Turkey. Its population is 80 (2021).
