= İğdir, Yeşilova =

Village in Turkey

İğdir
- Village
- Country: Turkey
- Province: Burdur
- District: Yeşilova
- Population (2021): 230
- Time zone: UTC+3 (TRT)

İğdir is a village in the Yeşilova District of Burdur Province in Turkey. Its population is 230 (2021).
