= Gençali, Yeşilova =

Village in Turkey

Gençali
- Village
- Country: Turkey
- Province: Burdur
- District: Yeşilova
- Population (2021): 208
- Time zone: UTC+3 (TRT)

Gençali is a village in the Yeşilova District of Burdur Province in Turkey. Its population is 208 (2021).
