= Karaköy, Yeşilova =

Village in Turkey

Karaköy
- Village
- Location within Turkey
- Country: Turkey
- Province: Burdur
- District: Yeşilova
- Population (2021): 75
- Time zone: UTC+3 (TRT)

Karaköy is a village in the Yeşilova District of Burdur Province in Turkey. Its population is 75 (2021). The name Karaköy comes from kara meaning black and köy meaning village or settlement so it means black village.
