= Yeşilova District =

District of Burdur Province, Turkey

- District
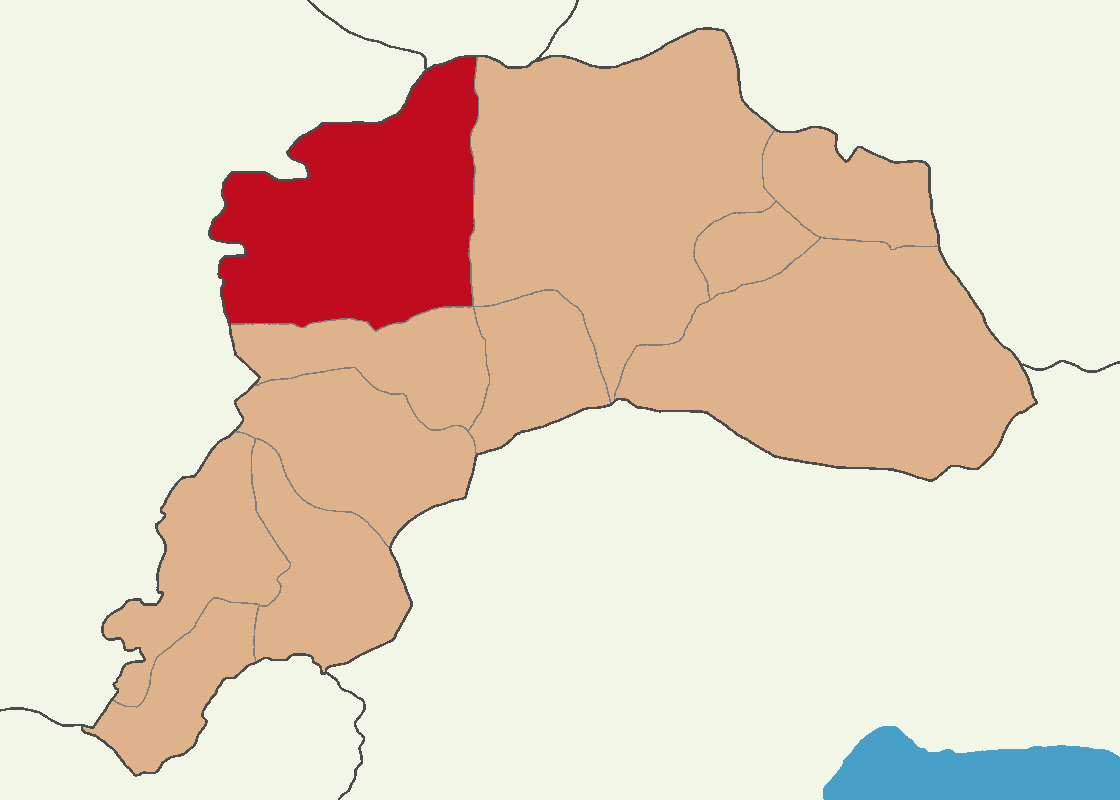
- Map showing Yeşilova District in Burdur Province

- Location in Turkey
- Coordinates: 37°30′N 29°45′E
- Country: Turkey
- Province: Burdur
- Seat: Yeşilova

Government
  - Kaymakam: Erdem Yenisoy
- Area: 1,108 km^{2} (428 sq mi)
- Population (2021): 14,773
  - Density: 13/km^{2} (35/sq mi)
- Time zone: UTC+3 (TRT)
- Website: www.yesilova.gov.tr

Yeşilova District is a district of the Burdur Province of Turkey. Its seat is the town of Yeşilova. Its area is 1,108 km^{2}, and its population is 14,773 (2021).

== Composition ==
There is one municipality in Yeşilova District:

- Yeşilova

There are 37 villages in Yeşilova District:

- Akçaköy
- Alanköy
- Armutköy
- Aşağıkırlı
- Başkuyu
- Bayındır
- Bayırbaşı
- Bedirli
- Beyköy
- Büyükyaka
- Çaltepe
- Çardak
- Çeltek
- Çuvallı
- Dereköy
- Doğanbaba
- Düdenköy
- Elden
- Gençali
- Gökçeyaka
- Güney
- Harmanlı
- Horozköy
- İğdir
- Işıklar
- Karaatlı
- Karaköy
- Kavakköy
- Niyazlar
- Onacak
- Örencik
- Orhanlı
- Salda
- Sazak
- Taşpınar
- Yarışlı
- Yukarıkırlı
