= Orhanlı, Yeşilova =

Village in Turkey

Orhanlı
- Village
- Location in Turkey
- Coordinates: 37.62°N 29.7944°E
- Country: Turkey
- Province: Burdur
- District: Yeşilova
- Population (2021): 184
- Time zone: UTC+3 (TRT)

Orhanlı is a village in the Yeşilova District of Burdur Province in Turkey. Its population is 184 (2021).
