= Çardak, Yeşilova =

Village in Turkey

Çardak
- Village
- Location within Turkey
- Coordinates: 37.6980°N 29.9455°E
- Country: Turkey
- Province: Burdur
- District: Yeşilova
- Population (2021): 104
- Time zone: UTC+3 (TRT)

Çardak is a village in the Yeşilova District of Burdur Province in Turkey. Its population is 104 (2021).
