= Alanköy, Yeşilova =

Village in Turkey

Alanköy
- Village
- Location in Turkey
- Coordinates: 37.6793°N 29.8467°E
- Country: Turkey
- Province: Burdur
- District: Yeşilova
- Population (2021): 239
- Time zone: UTC+3 (TRT)

Alanköy is a village in the Yeşilova District of Burdur Province in Turkey. Its population is 239 (2021).
