= Başkuyu, Yeşilova =

Village in Turkey

Başkuyu
- Village
- Location in Turkey
- Coordinates: 37.5061°N 29.8764°E
- Country: Turkey
- Province: Burdur
- District: Yeşilova
- Population (2021): 372
- Time zone: UTC+3 (TRT)

Başkuyu is a village in the Yeşilova District of Burdur Province in Turkey. Its population is 372 (2021).
