= Aşağıkırlı, Yeşilova =

Village in Turkey

Aşağıkırlı
- Village
- Location in Turkey
- Coordinates: 37°41′N 29°43′E
- Country: Turkey
- Province: Burdur
- District: Yeşilova
- Population (2021): 86
- Time zone: UTC+3 (TRT)

Aşağıkırlı is a village in the Yeşilova District of Burdur Province in Turkey. Its population is 86 (2021).
