= Taşpınar, Yeşilova =

Village in Turkey

Taşpınar
- Village
- Country: Turkey
- Province: Burdur
- District: Yeşilova
- Population (2021): 59
- Time zone: UTC+3 (TRT)

Taşpınar is a village in the Yeşilova District of Burdur Province in Turkey. Its population is 59 (2021).
