= Bayırbaşı, Yeşilova =

Village in Turkey

Bayırbaşı
- Village
- Location in Turkey
- Coordinates: 37.5087°N 29.8082°E
- Country: Turkey
- Province: Burdur
- District: Yeşilova
- Population (2021): 100
- Time zone: UTC+3 (TRT)

Bayırbaşı is a village in the Yeşilova District of Burdur Province in Turkey. Its population is 100 (2021).
