= Yukarıkırlı, Yeşilova =

Village in Turkey

Yukarıkırlı
- Village
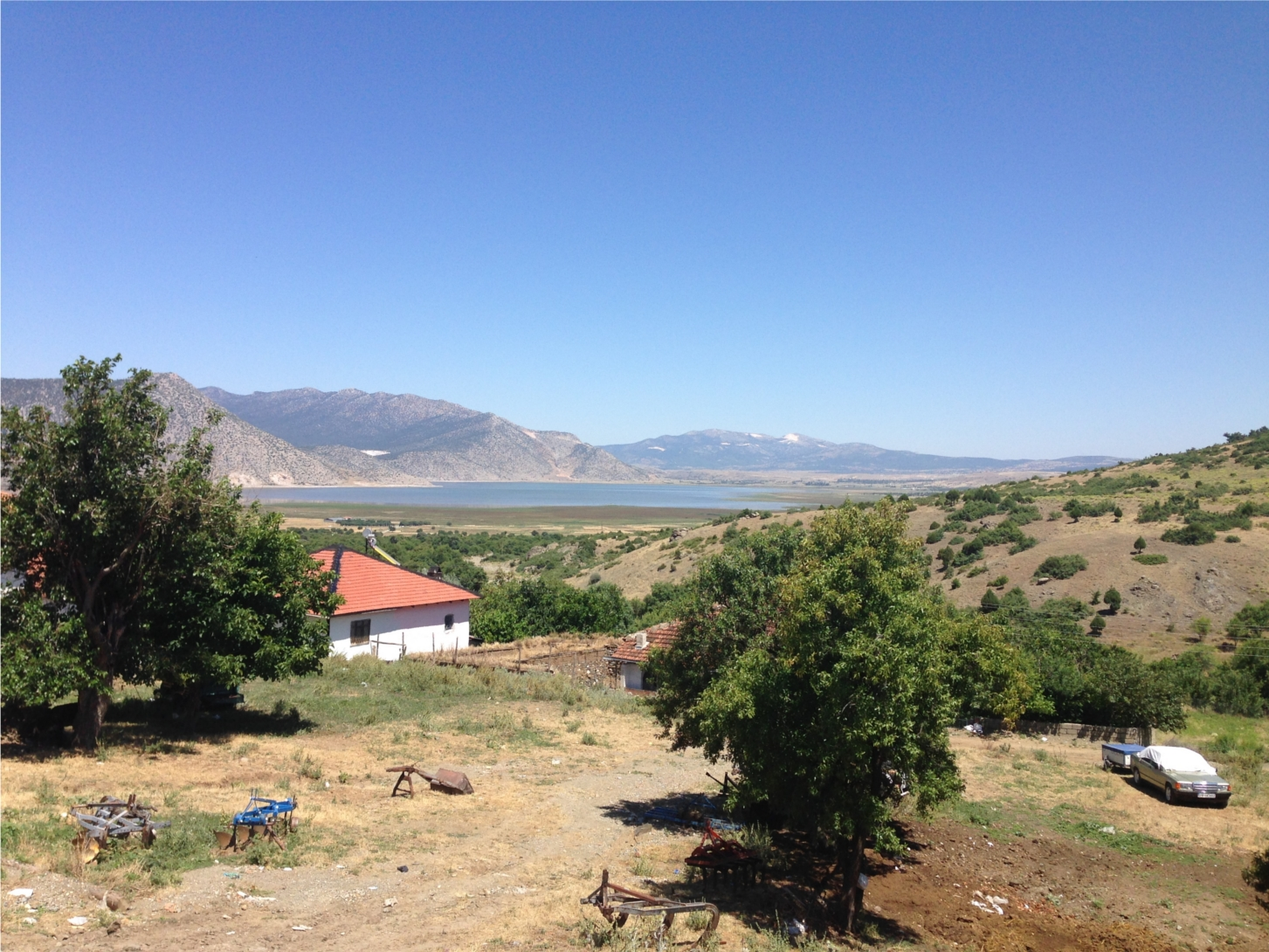

- Location within Turkey
- Coordinates: 37°40′N 29°42′E
- Country: Turkey
- Province: Burdur
- District: Yeşilova
- Population (2021): 63
- Time zone: UTC+3 (TRT)

Yukarıkırlı (also: Kırlı) is a village in the Yeşilova District of Burdur Province in Turkey. Its population is 63 (2021).
