= Niyazlar, Yeşilova =

Village in Turkey

Niyazlar
- Village
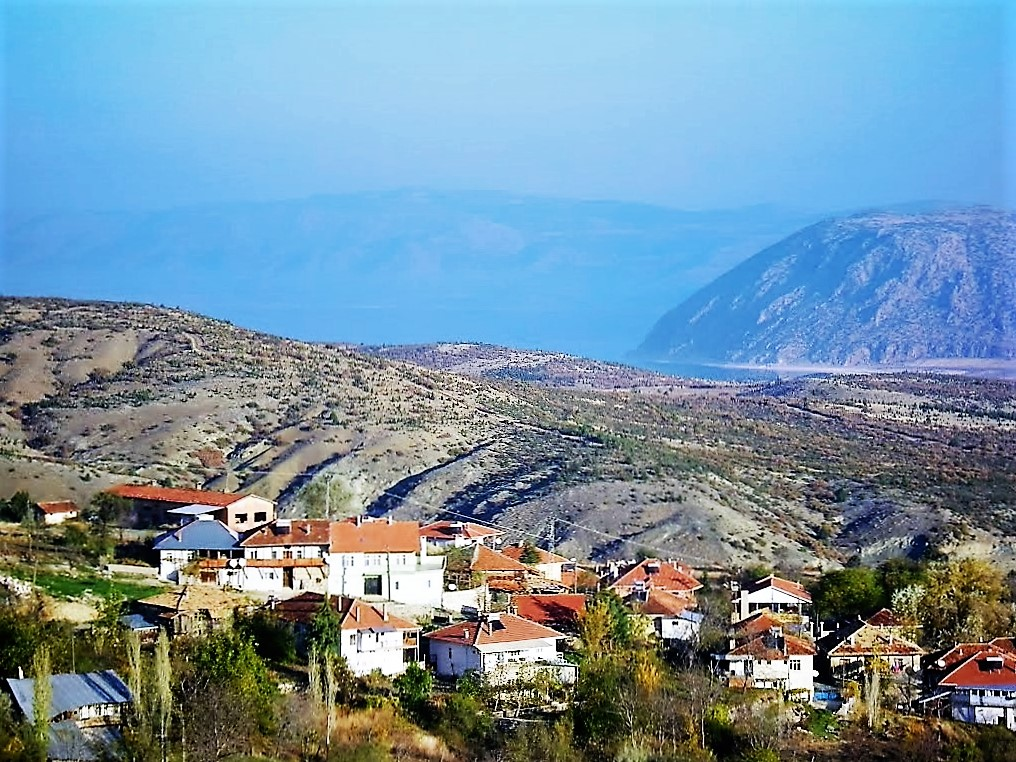

- Location within Turkey
- Coordinates: 37°28′N 29°44′E
- Country: Turkey
- Province: Burdur
- District: Yeşilova
- Population (2021): 67
- Time zone: UTC+3 (TRT)

Niyazlar is a village in the Yeşilova District of Burdur Province in Turkey. Its population is 67 (2021).
