= Bədirli =

- Municipality
- Location within Azerbaijan
- Coordinates: 39°18′11″N 48°25′02″E
- Country: Azerbaijan
- Rayon: Jalilabad

Population
  - Total: 741
- Time zone: UTC+4 (AZT)
  - Summer (DST): UTC+5 (AZT)

Bədirli (also, Bedirli and Byaderli) is a village and municipality in the Jalilabad Rayon of Azerbaijan. It has a population of 741.
