= Bedirli, Yeşilova =

Village in Turkey

Bedirli
- Village
- Location within Turkey
- Coordinates: 37.4609°N 29.8349°E
- Country: Turkey
- Province: Burdur
- District: Yeşilova
- Population (2021): 640
- Time zone: UTC+3 (TRT)

Bedirli is a village in the Yeşilova District of Burdur Province in Turkey. Its population is 640 (2021).
