= The Deepest Breath =

2023 documentary film by Laura McGann

- Release poster
- Directed by: Laura McGann
- Written by: Laura McGann
- Produced by: John Battsek; Sarah Thomson; Jamie D'Alton; Anne McLoughlin
- Cinematography: Tim Cragg
- Edited by: Julian Hart
- Music by: Nainita Desai
- Production companies: A24; Motive Films; Ventureland; Raw TV
- Distributed by: Netflix
- Release dates: January 22, 2023 (Sundance); July 19, 2023 (Netflix)
- Running time: 108 minutes
- Countries: United Kingdom; Ireland
- Languages: English; Italian; Japanese

The Deepest Breath is a 2023 documentary film directed and written by Laura McGann that profiles Italian freediver Alessia Zecchini on her quest to break a world record with the help of safety diver Stephen Keenan and her competition against Japanese freediver Hanako Hirose.

== Release ==
The film had its world premiere on 22 January 2023 at the 2023 Sundance Film Festival. Prior to its premiere, Netflix acquired its distribution rights. It is set to screen in the Special Premieres section at the Copenhagen International Documentary Film Festival 2023. It was released in Italy as Respiro profondo - La sfida di Alessia Zecchini ('Deep breath — the challenge of Alessia Zecchini').

== Reception ==
On the review aggregator website Rotten Tomatoes, 84% of 61 critics' reviews are positive, with an average rating of 7.5/10. The site's critical consensus reads, "A compelling documentary that can feel like a thriller, The Deepest Breath couples real-life tragedy with stunning footage of the ocean's depths." Metacritic, which uses a weighted average, assigned the film a score of 69 out of 100, based on 18 critics, indicating "generally favorable" reviews.
