= Lake Salda =

Crater lake in Turkey

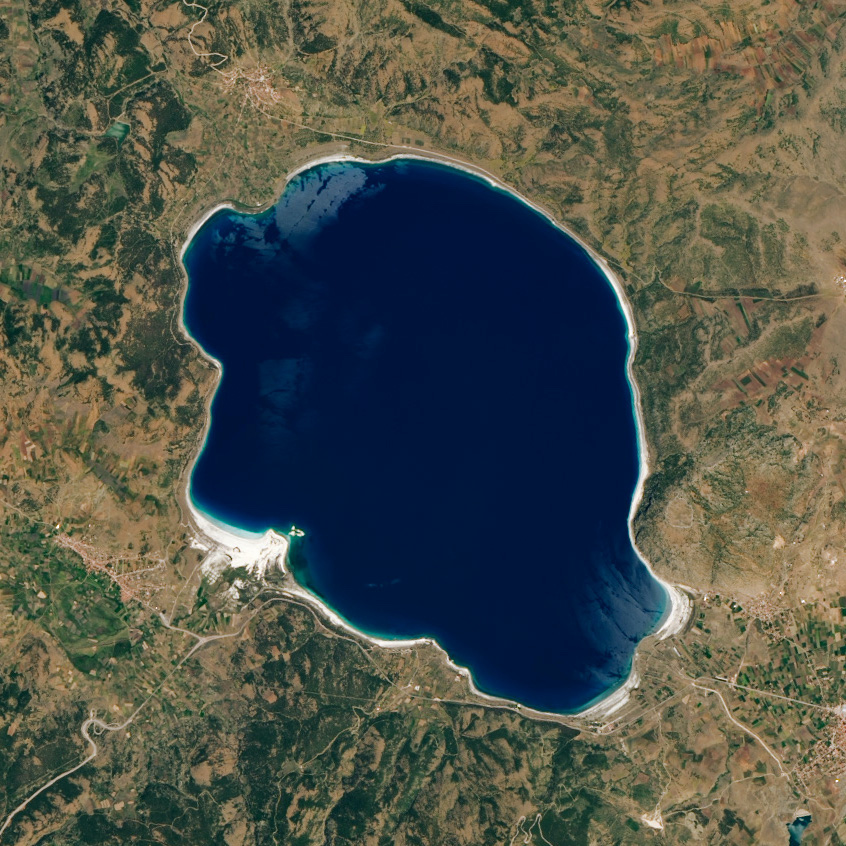
- Lake Salda in June 2020

- Location within Turkey
- Coordinates: 37°33′N 29°41′E
- Basin countries: Turkey
- Surface area: 43.70 km^{2} (16.87 sq mi)
- Max. depth: 196 m (643 ft)
- Surface elevation: 1,316 m (4,318 ft)
- Settlements: Salda

Lake Salda is a mid-size crater lake in southwestern Turkey, within the boundaries of Yeşilova district of Burdur Province. It lies at a distance of about 50 km (31 mi) to the west from the province seat Burdur.

Lake Salda is often included in the Turkish Lakes Region that extends across inner western to southern Anatolia, especially Isparta Province and Afyonkarahisar Province, while Lake Salda is geographically separate from those lakes and is also morphologically distinct because of its unique carbonate-rich sediments and shoreline features.

The lake area covers 4,370 ha (16.9 sq mi), and its depth reaches 196 m (643 ft), making it one of the deepest lakes in Turkey. The lake sedimentary records show high resolution climate changes that are related to solar variability during the last millennium.

The lake is a popular excursion spot for people across the region or from beyond, the more so due to the hydromagnesite mineral found in its coastal waters, which is believed to offer remedies for certain dermatological diseases. The shorelines, surrounded by black pine forests, are also popular among hunters, the game and the fowl available including quails, hares, foxes, boars and wild ducks, aside from the lake's fish. White sandy beaches, limpid water and seven crystal-white islets within the lake complete the scenery.

A township that starts almost at the shore to the southwest of the lake carries the same name, Salda. The local administrative seat of Yeşilova is located to the east of the lake at a distance of about four kilometers and Yeşilova municipality manages the lake's camping facilities.

Its peculiar morphology has led to a number of academic studies conducted on Lake Salda. The unusual alkaline nature of the lake means that is one of the few locations where ancient stromatolite algae still grows.

== Microbialites from Lake Salda in the search for extraterrestrial life ==
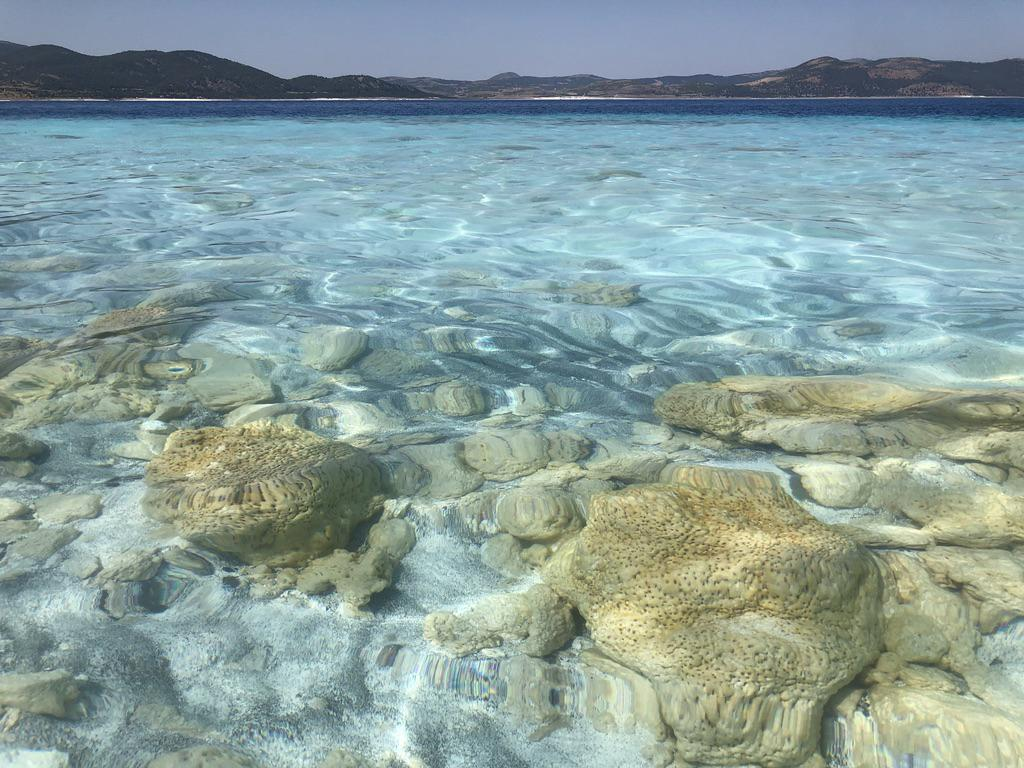
Microbialites in Lake Salda rocks have been studied by NASA scientists for the discovery of life on Mars

In 2019, a team of planetary scientists from the United States and Turkey conducted research on Lake Salda's shoreline microbialite sediments. The rocks along the shoreline of Lake Salda were formed over time by microbes that trap minerals and sediments in the water. These microbialites were once a major form of life on Earth and provide some of the oldest known fossilized records of life on our planet. NASA's Mars 2020 mission Perseverance rover searches for signs of ancient life on the surface of Mars. Studying these microbial fossils from Lake Salda has helped scientists prepare for the mission. In March 2021, NASA reported that its Mars surface-exploring rover Perseverance showed that "the minerals and rock deposits at Lake Salda are the nearest match on Earth to those around the Jezero Crater where the spacecraft landed."

== Lake Salda National Park ==
Hoping to protect the Lake Salda area, Turkey's environmental authority has launched a national park project. The Lake Salda National Park is currently under construction and is scheduled to be completed in 2023.

A 24-hour livestream of the lake can be seen on its official website.

== Gallery ==
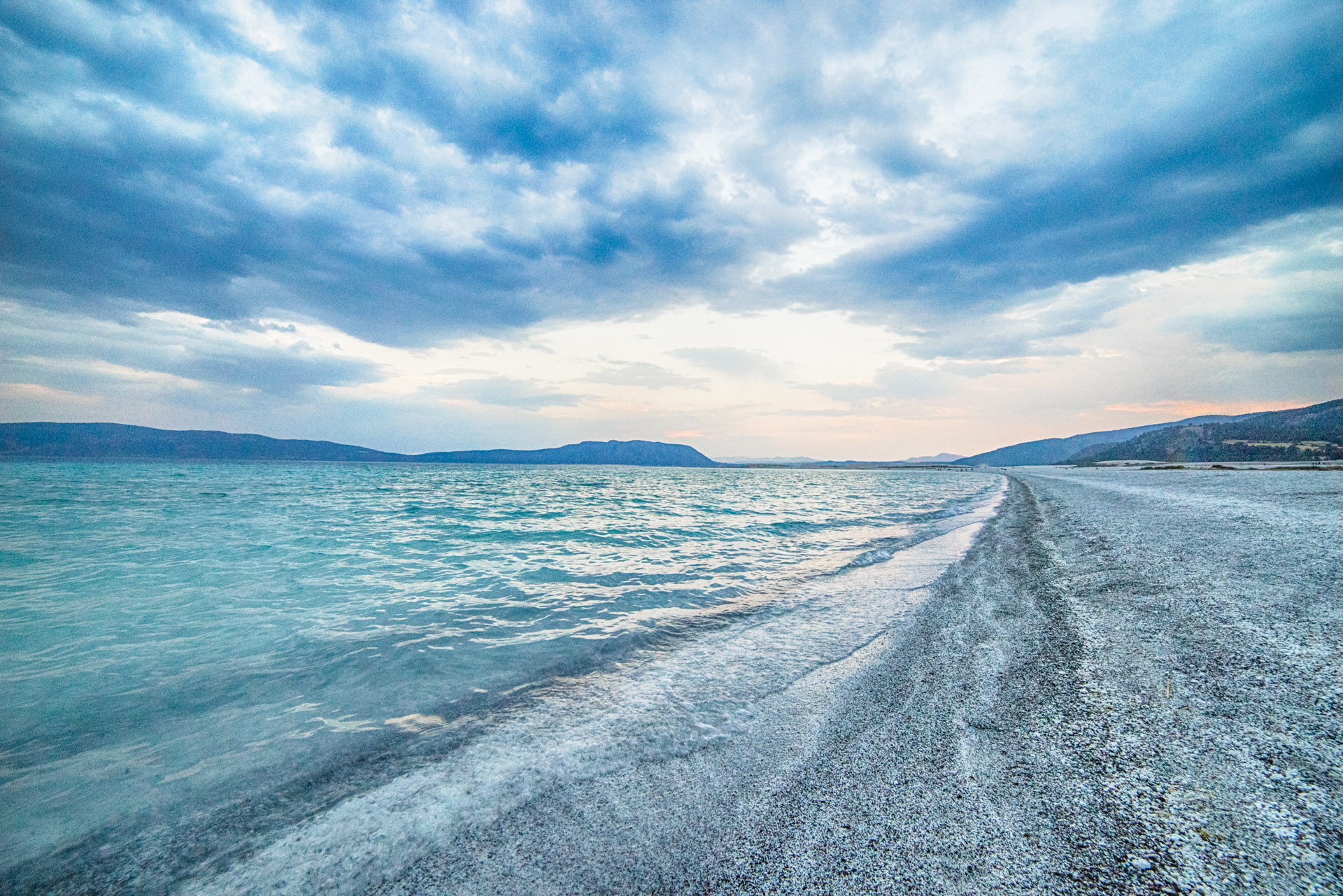
The coast of Lake Salda has been declared a natural reserve after some environmental concerns

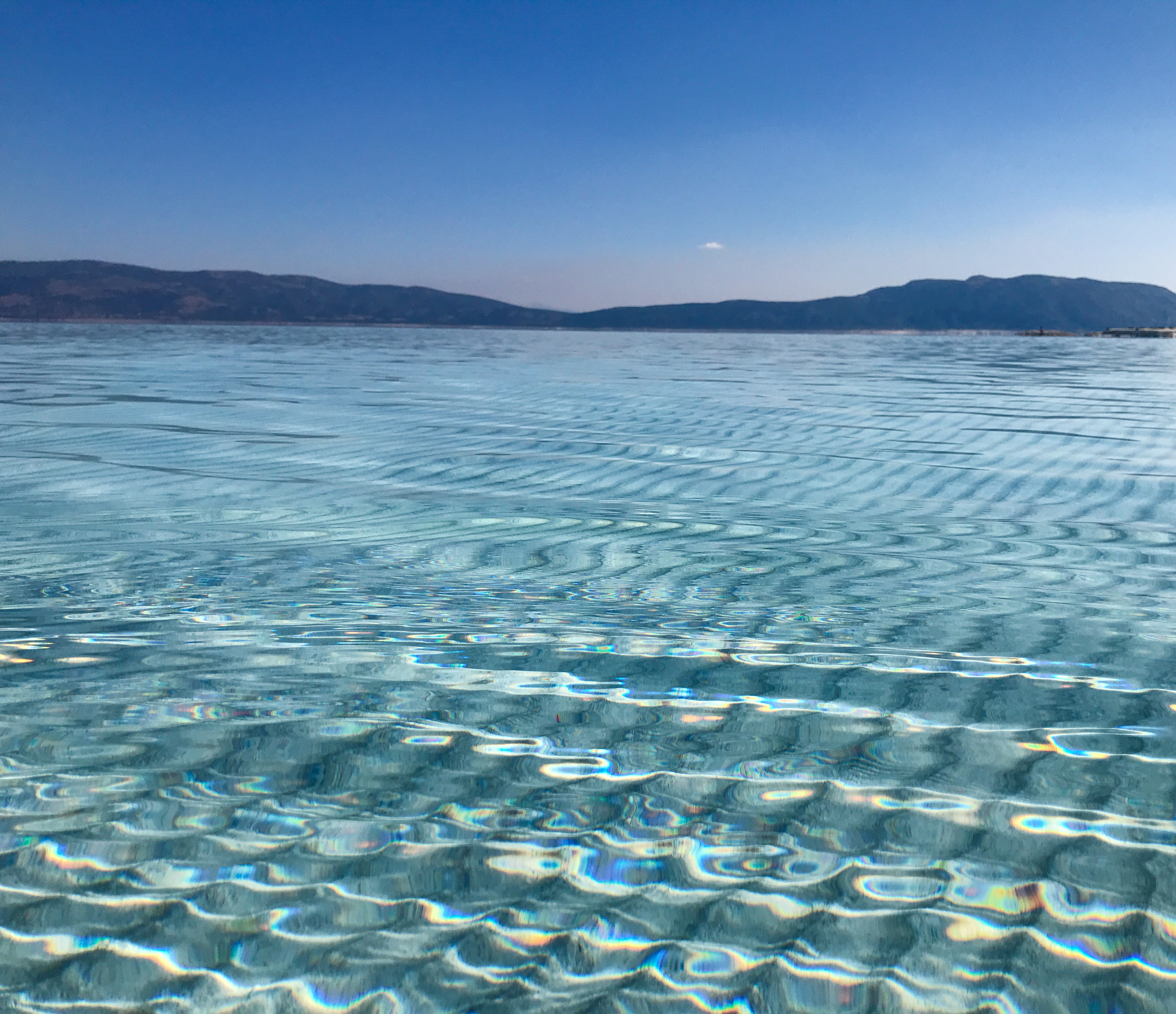
Lake Salda

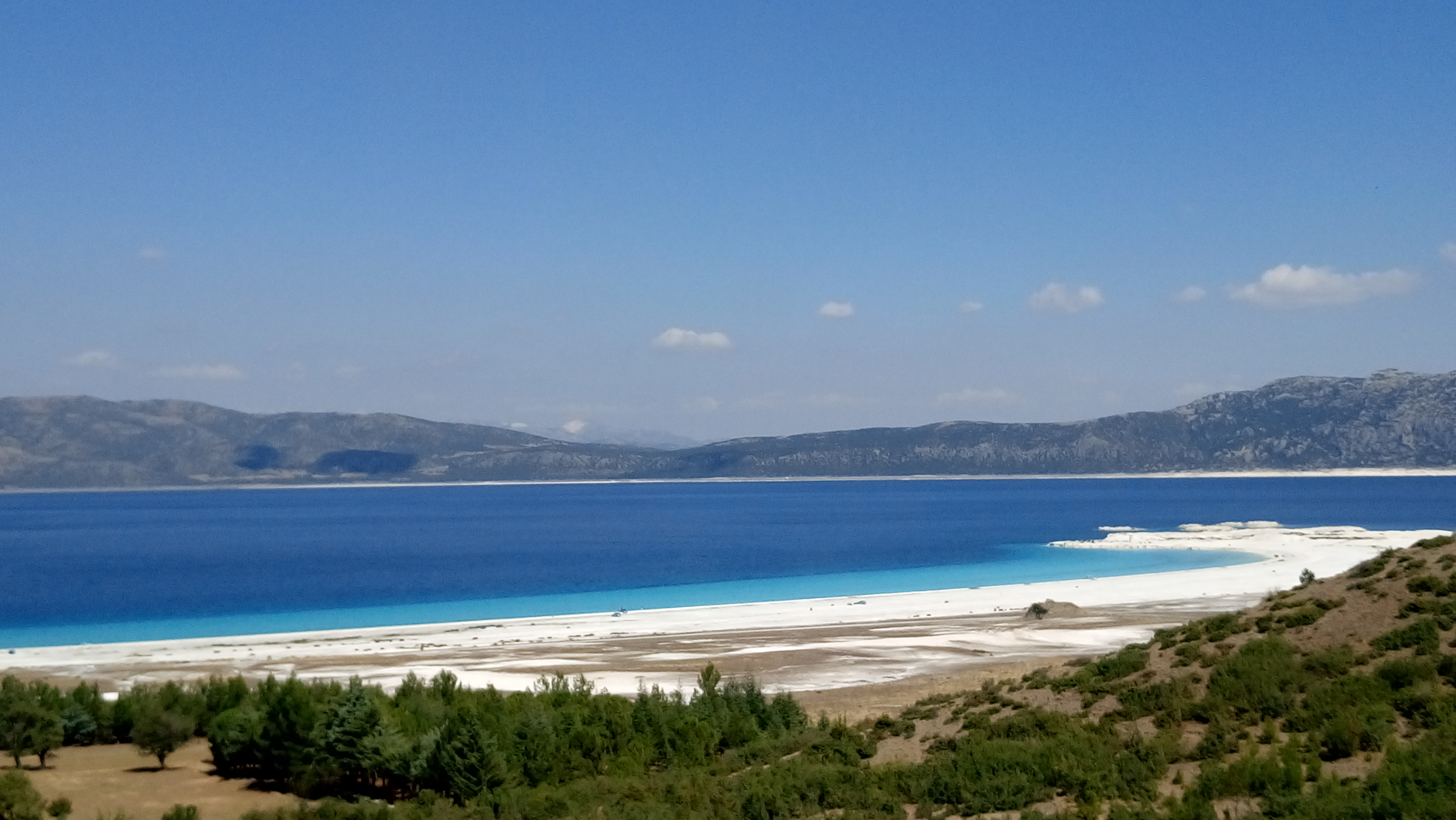
Lake Salda

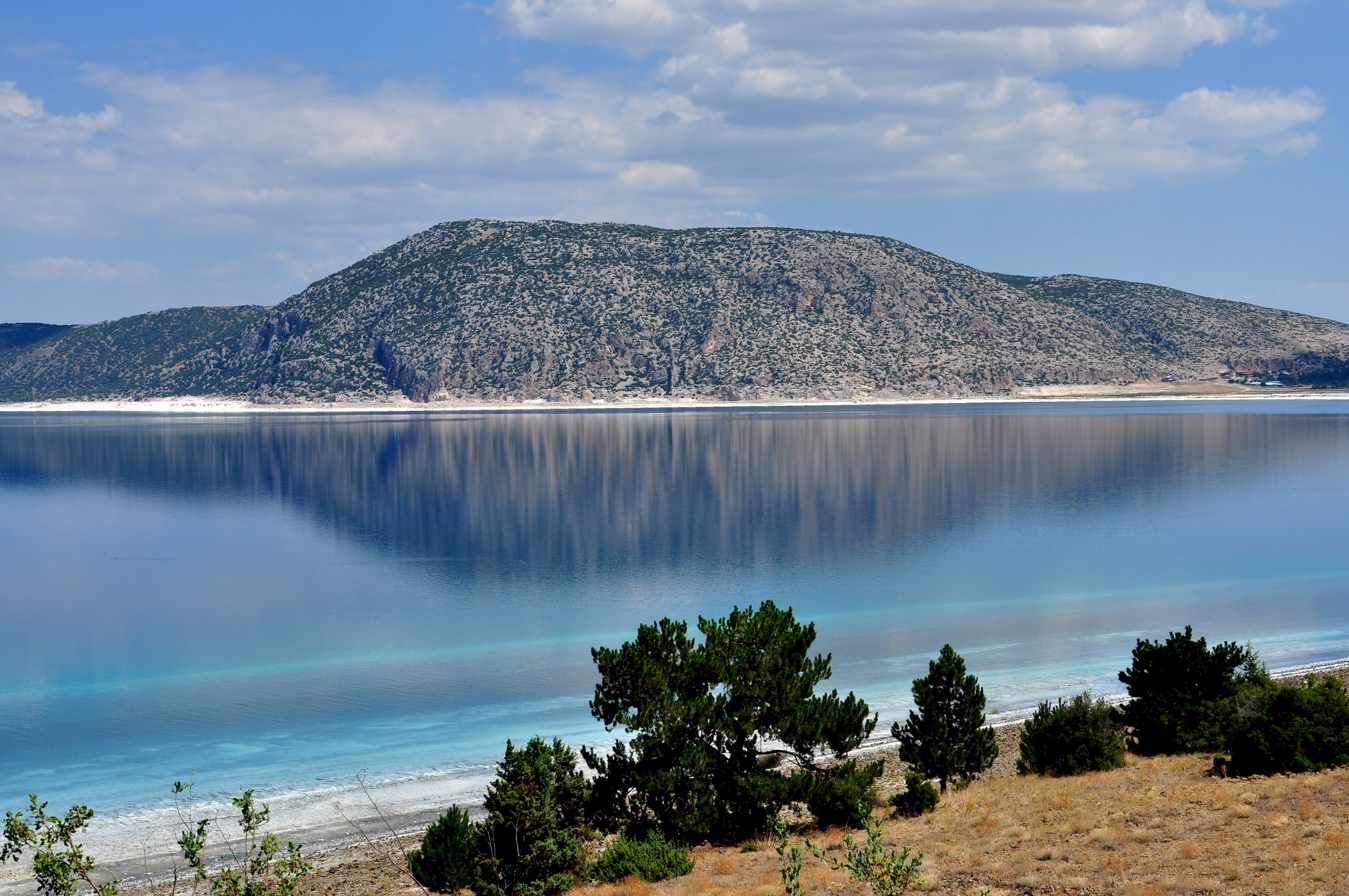
Lake Salda
