= Dahab =

Dahab دهب
- coastal town
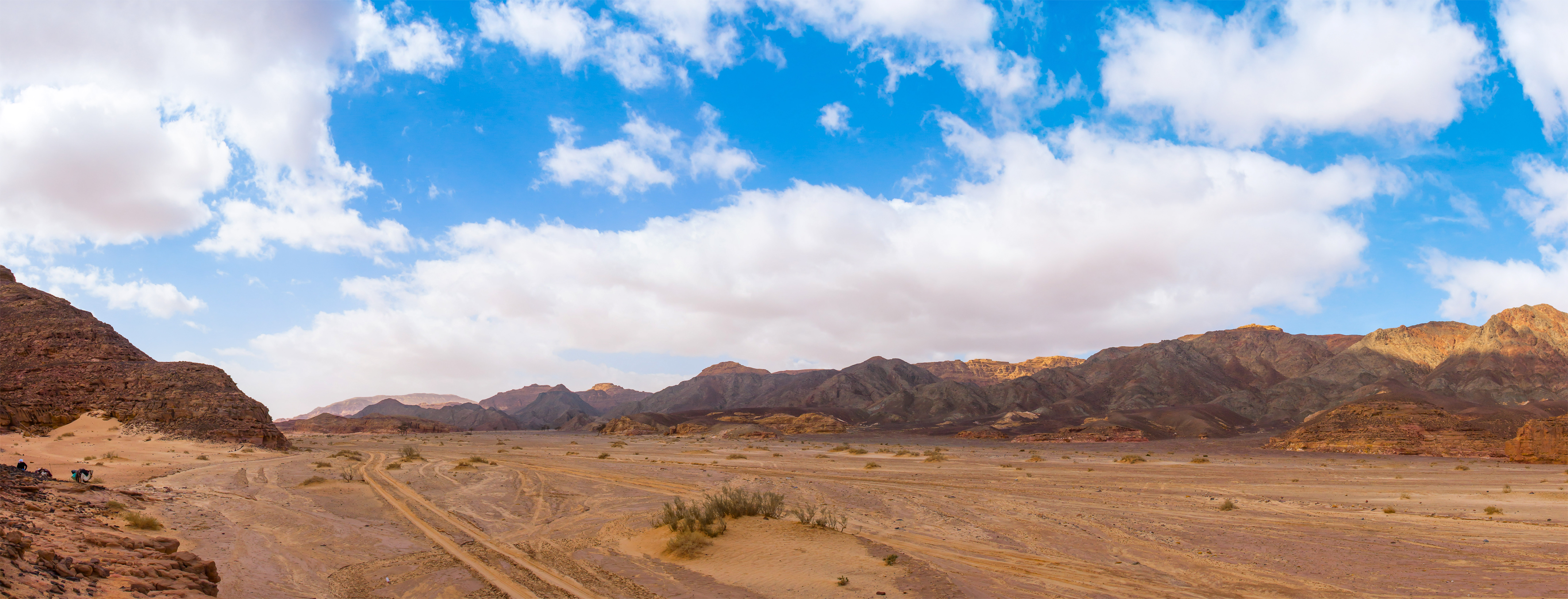
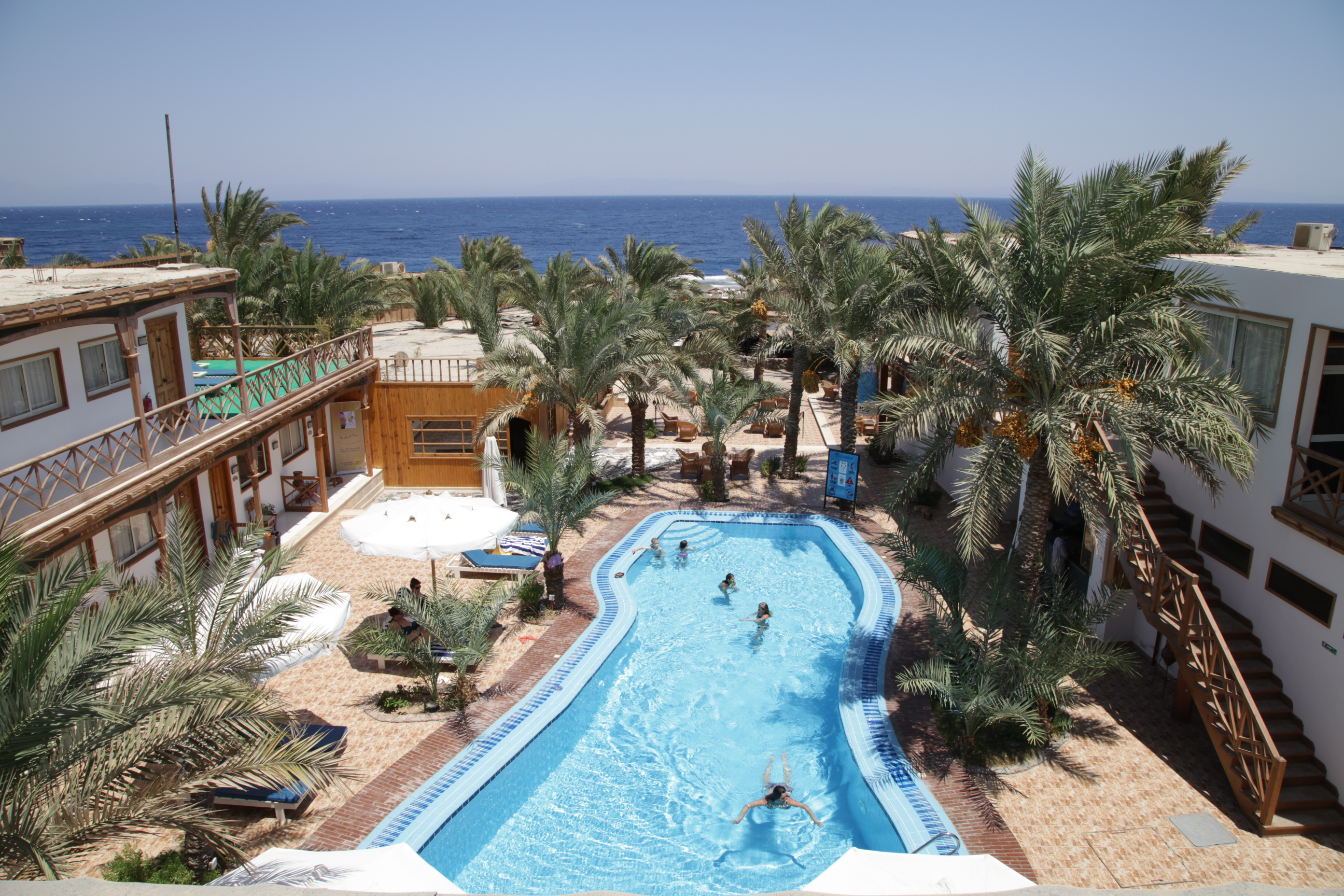
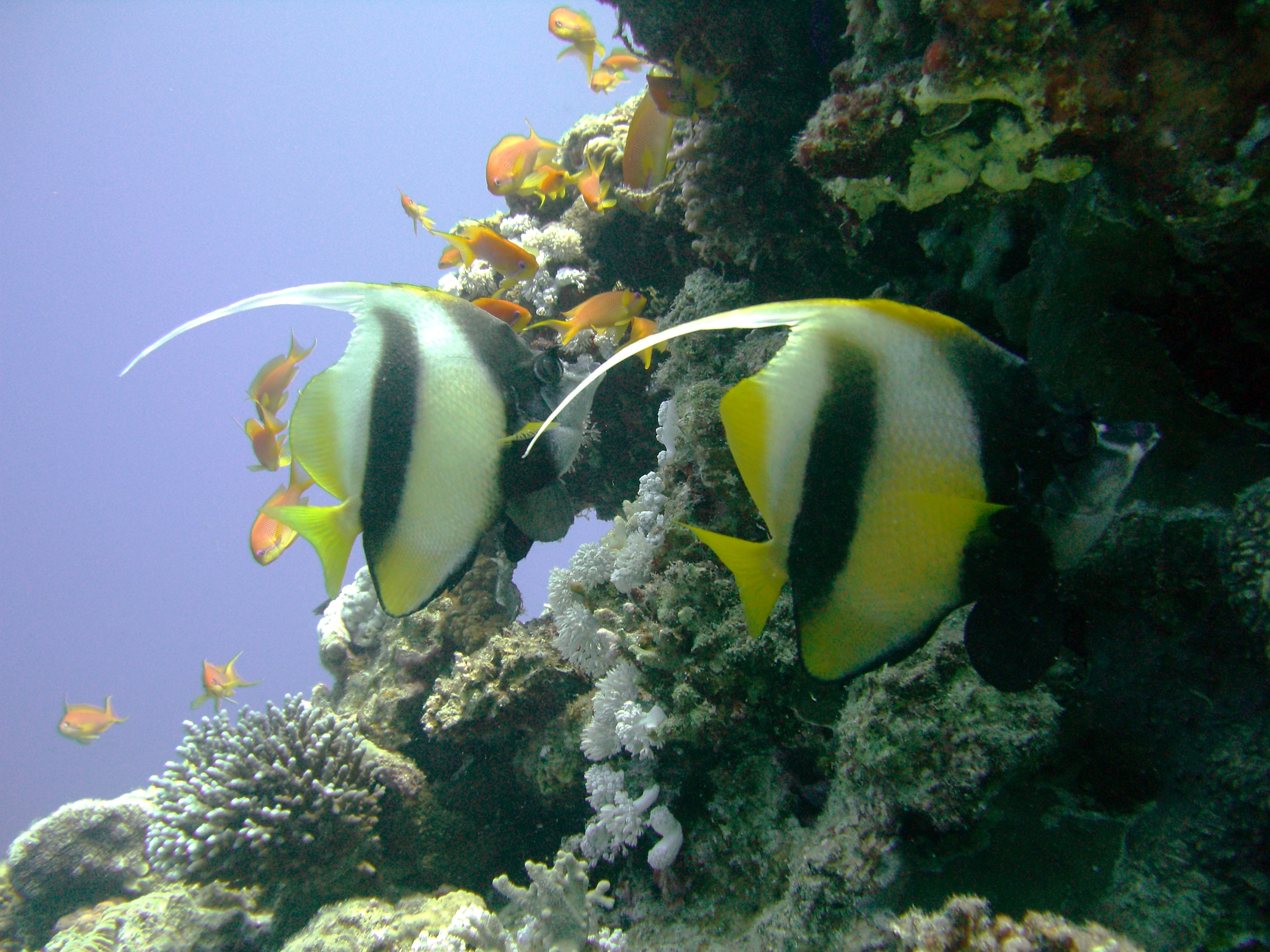
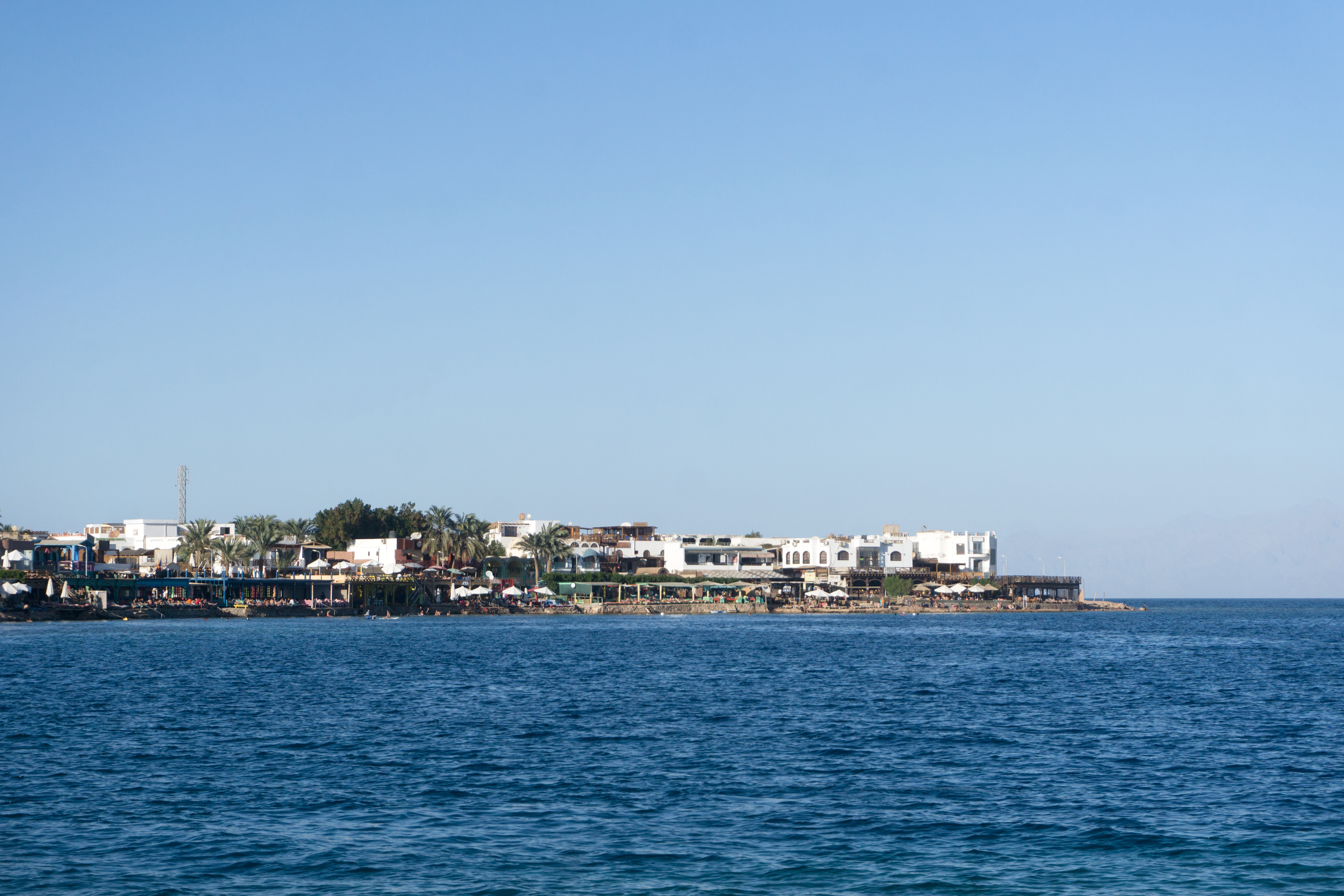
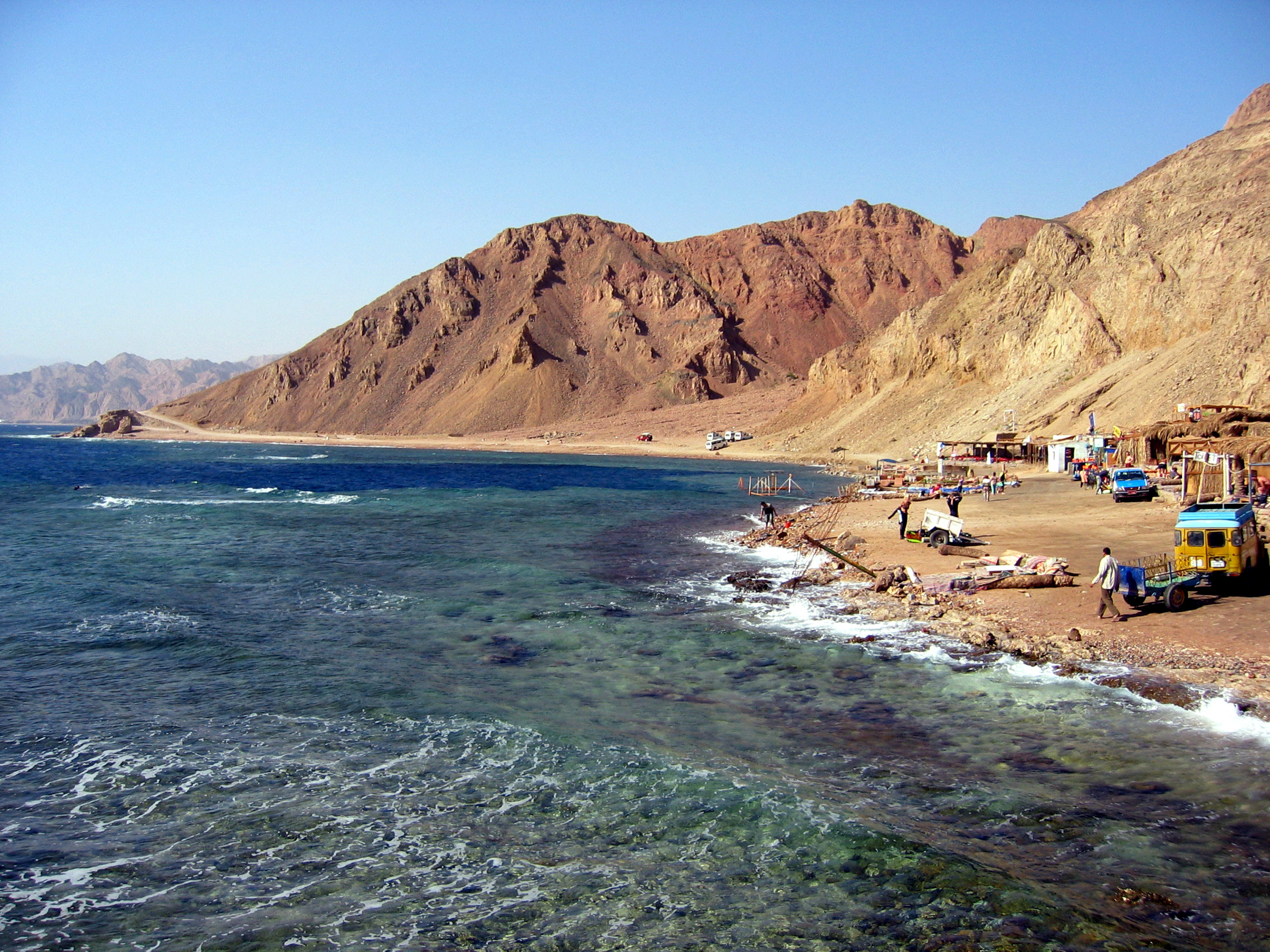
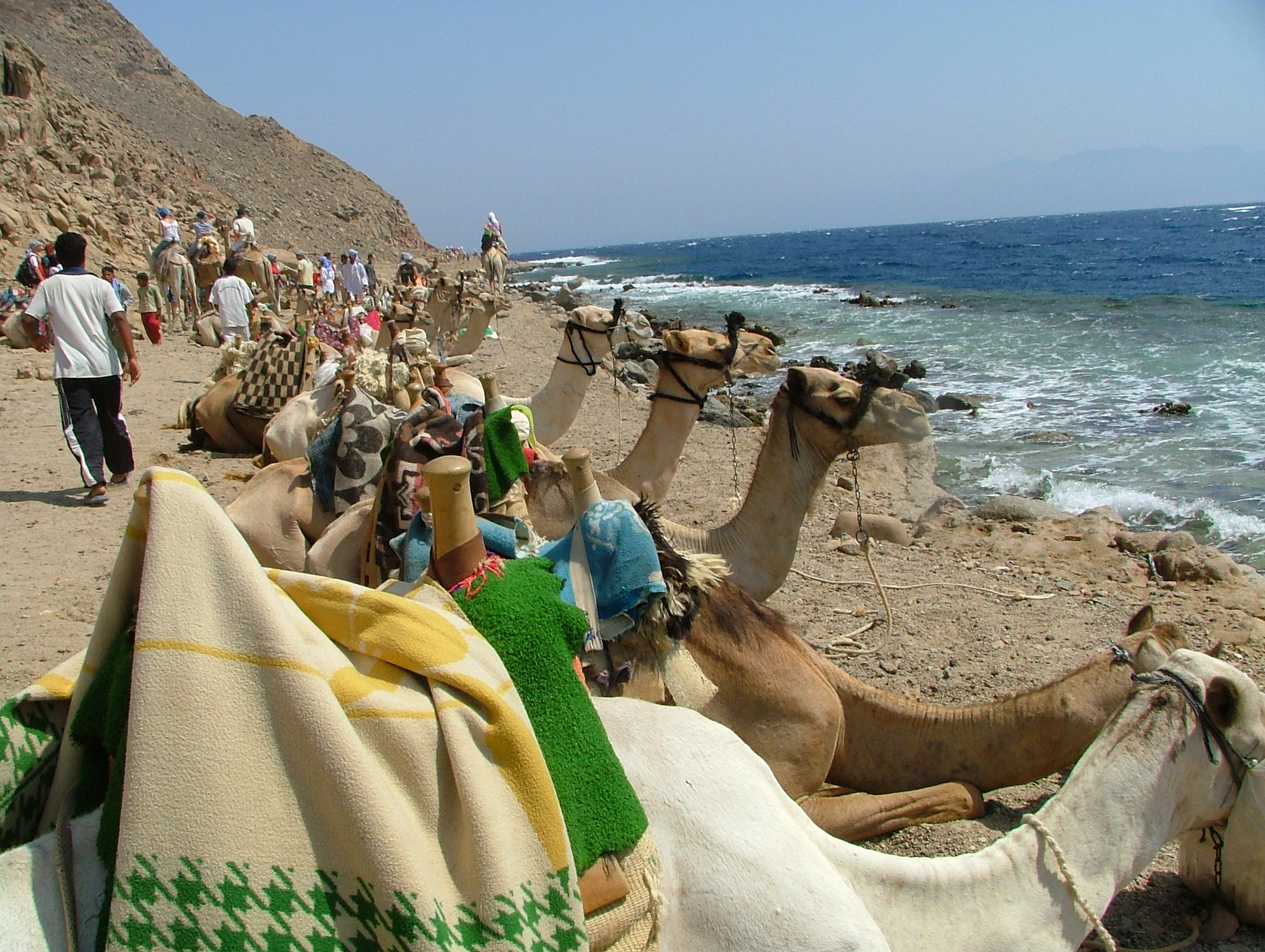
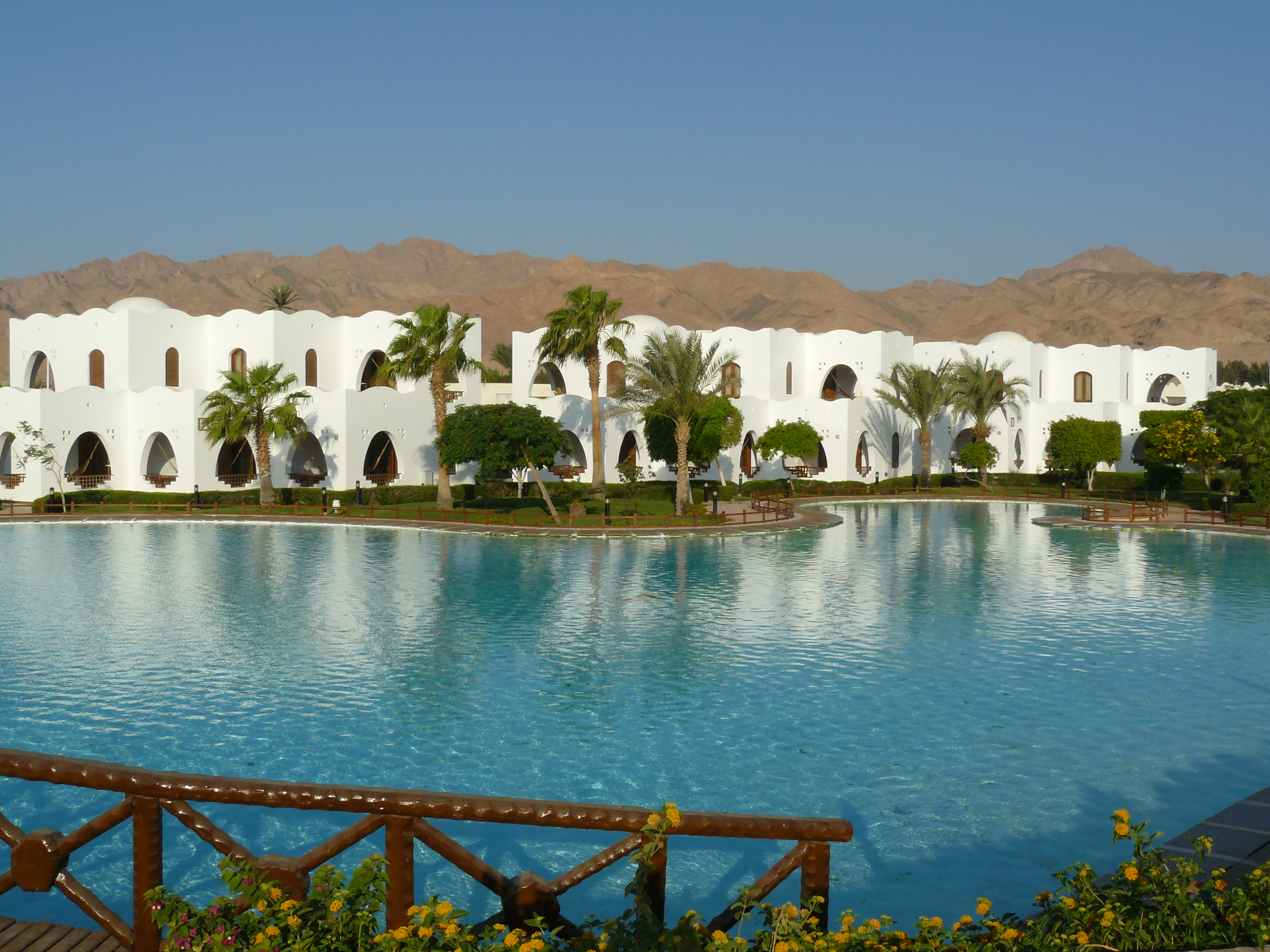
- Sinai Mountains Coastal resort Coral Reef View from the Red Sea Blue Hole Camel Riding Hilton Hotel

- Location in Egypt's Sinai Peninsula
- Coordinates: 28°29′35″N 34°30′17″E
- Country: Egypt
- Governorate: South Sinai

Area
  - Total: 1,083 km^{2} (418 sq mi)
- Elevation: 21 m (69 ft)

Population (2023)
  - Total: 3,169
  - Density: 2.926/km^{2} (7.579/sq mi)
- Time zone: UTC+2 (EET)
  - Summer (DST): UTC+3 (EEST)

Dahab (Egyptian Arabic: دهب, romanized: dahab, lit. 'gold', IPA: [ˈdæhæb]) is a small town on the southeast coast of the Sinai Peninsula in Egypt, approximately 80 km (50 mi) northeast of Sharm el-Sheikh.

Dahab can be divided into three major parts. Masbat, which includes the Bedouin village of Asalah, in the north; Mashraba, south of Masbat, and Medina in the southwest. Dahab is mentioned in Deuteronomy as דִ֥י זָהָֽב (dî zāhāḇ), and in the Septuagint translation as Καταχρύσεα. Gesenius exegetes as, “I have no doubt but that it is the same place as that now called Dehab on the western shore of the Ælanitic gulf, where there are many palms.” Dahab is known as the "diving capital" of South Sinai, and one of the most famous diving destinations in the world, thanks to a number of unique sites that suit all levels of diving enthusiasts.

== Tourism ==
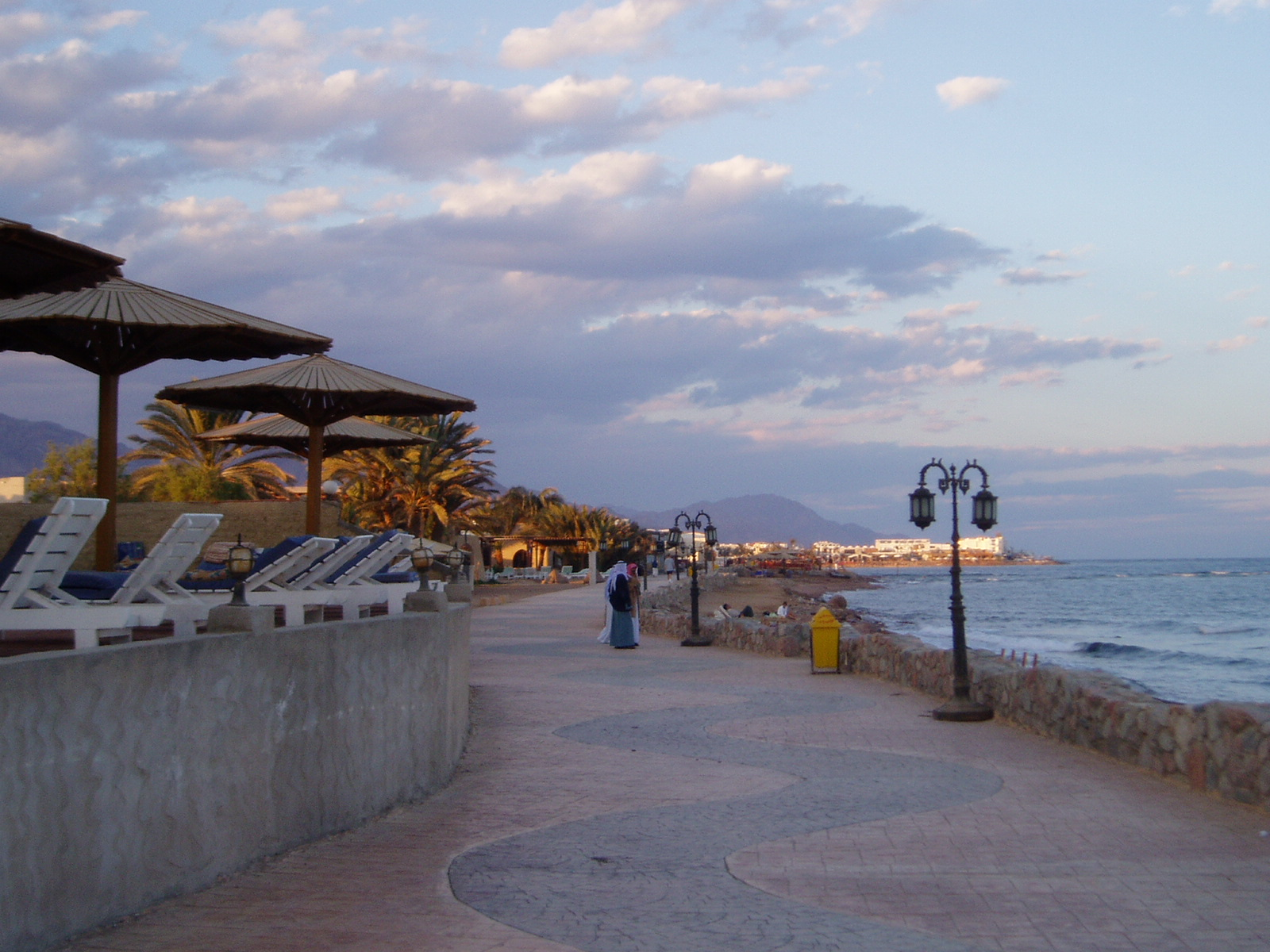
Beach promenade on a winter day

Dahab attracts large numbers of tourists. It is world-renowned for its windsurfing.

Local Bedouin children, sometimes encouraged by their families, come to beach cafes and restaurants to sell items such as woven bracelets to tourists.

== Geography ==
=== Landscape ===
Dahab contains many mineral deposits, including rutile, zircon, monazite, leucoxene, and gold. Many of these are Neoproterozoic rocks such as schist.

=== Climate ===
Dahab has a hot desert climate (Köppen: BWh) as the rest of Egypt. The weather on summer days is very hot and also quite hot at night. Winter days are warm and nights are mild. Dahab has a very dry climate and rain is rare, even during the winter months. The precipitation peaks in February.

Climate data for Dahab
Month	Jan	Feb	Mar	Apr	May	Jun	Jul	Aug	Sep	Oct	Nov	Dec	Year
Mean daily maximum °C (°F)	21.0 (69.8)	22.4 (72.3)	25.3 (77.5)	28.7 (83.7)	32.2 (90.0)	34.7 (94.5)	35.5 (95.9)	35.8 (96.4)	33.5 (92.3)	30.5 (86.9)	26.5 (79.7)	22.2 (72.0)	29.0 (84.3)
Daily mean °C (°F)	15.6 (60.1)	16.7 (62.1)	19.6 (67.3)	22.9 (73.2)	26.1 (79.0)	29.0 (84.2)	30.2 (86.4)	30.4 (86.7)	28.4 (83.1)	25.1 (77.2)	21.1 (70.0)	16.8 (62.2)	23.5 (74.3)
Mean daily minimum °C (°F)	10.2 (50.4)	11.0 (51.8)	14.0 (57.2)	17.1 (62.8)	20.1 (68.2)	23.4 (74.1)	24.9 (76.8)	25.0 (77.0)	23.4 (74.1)	19.8 (67.6)	15.7 (60.3)	11.5 (52.7)	18.0 (64.4)
Average precipitation mm (inches)	1 (0.0)	2 (0.1)	2 (0.1)	0 (0)	0 (0)	0 (0)	0 (0)	0 (0)	0 (0)	1 (0.0)	1 (0.0)	2 (0.1)	9 (0.3)
Average rainy days	1	1	1	1	1	0	0	0	0	1	1	1	8
Mean daily sunshine hours	8	9	9	10	11	13	13	12	11	10	9	8	10
Source 1: Climate-Data.org
Source 2: Weather to Travel for rainy days and sunshine

Dahab mean sea temperature
Jan	Feb	Mar	Apr	May	Jun	Jul	Aug	Sep	Oct	Nov	Dec
22 °C (72 °F)	21 °C (70 °F)	21 °C (70 °F)	23 °C (73 °F)	25 °C (77 °F)	26 °C (79 °F)	28 °C (82 °F)	28 °C (82 °F)	28 °C (82 °F)	27 °C (81 °F)	25 °C (77 °F)	23 °C (73 °F)

== See also ==
- List of cities and towns in Egypt
- Nuweiba
- Red Sea Riviera
