= Yeşilova =

- Municipality
- Location in Turkey
- Coordinates: 37°30′25″N 29°45′12″E
- Country: Turkey
- Province: Burdur
- District: Yeşilova

Government
  - Mayor: Okan Kurd (CHP)
- Population (2024): 14,773
- Time zone: UTC+3 (TRT)
- Postal code: 15200
- Website: www.yesilova.bel.tr

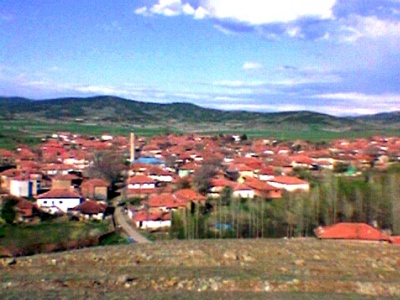
Akçaköy, Yeşilova, Burdur

Yeşilova is a town in Burdur Province in the Mediterranean region of Turkey. It is the seat of Yeşilova District. Its population is 5,451 (2021).
