= List of Islamic Solidarity Games medalists for Indonesia =

This is a list of Indonesian medalists at the Islamic Solidarity Games. For more information about Indonesian participation at the Islamic Solidarity Games, see Indonesia at the Islamic Solidarity Games.

== Medalists ==
Indonesia has participated in the Islamic Solidarity Games since the first edition in 2005, weightlifting being the most successful sport for Indonesia.

=== Archery ===
Medal	Name	Event	Games
Gold	Ika Yuliana Rochmawati	Women's individual recurve	2013 Islamic Solidarity Games
Gold	Riau Ega Agata; Ika Yuliana Rochmawati	Mixed team recurve	2013 Islamic Solidarity Games
Gold	Riau Ega Agata; Rezza Octavia	Mixed team recurve	2021 Islamic Solidarity Games
Silver	Diananda Choirunisa	Women's individual recurve	2013 Islamic Solidarity Games
Silver	Ika Yuliana Rochmawati; Titik Kusuma Wardani; Diananda Choirunisa	Women's team recurve	2013 Islamic Solidarity Games
Silver	I Gusti Nyoman Puruhito; Catur Wuri; Adi Nugroho	Men's team compound	2013 Islamic Solidarity Games
Silver	Arif Dwi Pangestu	Men's individual recurve	2021 Islamic Solidarity Games
Silver	Arif Dwi Pangestu; Alviyanto Prastyadi; Riau Ega Agata	Men's team recurve	2021 Islamic Solidarity Games
Silver	Pande Putu Gina Putri Arista; Asiefa Nur Haenza; Rezza Octavia	Women's team recurve	2021 Islamic Solidarity Games
Silver	Deki Adika Hastian; Hendika Pratama Putra; Prima Wisnu Wardhana	Men's team compound	2021 Islamic Solidarity Games
Bronze	Titik Kusuma Wardani	Women's individual recurve	2013 Islamic Solidarity Games
Bronze	Rona Siska Sari; Dellie Threesyadinda; Sri Ranti	Women's team compound	2013 Islamic Solidarity Games
Bronze	I Gusti Nyoman Puruhito; Rona Siska Sari	Mixed team compound	2013 Islamic Solidarity Games
Bronze	Rezza Octavia	Women's individual recurve	2021 Islamic Solidarity Games

=== Athletics ===
Medal	Name	Event	Games
Gold	Dedeh Erawati	Women's 100 m hurdles	2013 Islamic Solidarity Games
Gold	Eki Febri Ekawati	Women's javelin throw	2013 Islamic Solidarity Games
Silver	Hakmal Lisauda	Men's 20 km walk	2013 Islamic Solidarity Games
Silver	Eki Febri Ekawati	Women's shot put	2013 Islamic Solidarity Games
Silver	Dwi Ratnawati	Women's discus throw	2013 Islamic Solidarity Games
Silver	Maria Natalia Londa	Women's long jump	2017 Islamic Solidarity Games
Silver	Abdul Halim Dalimunte	Men's long jump T11	2017 Islamic Solidarity Games
Silver	Endang Sitorus	Women's 100 T12	2017 Islamic Solidarity Games
Silver	Endang Sitorus	Women's 200 T12	2017 Islamic Solidarity Games
Bronze	Andrian	Men's 400 m hurdles	2013 Islamic Solidarity Games
Bronze	Yaspi Boby; Sapwaturrahman; Fadlin; Iswandi	Men's 4 × 100 m relay	2013 Islamic Solidarity Games
Bronze	Emilia Nova	Women's 100 m hurdles	2021 Islamic Solidarity Games
Bronze	Eki Febri Ekawati	Women's shot put	2021 Islamic Solidarity Games

=== Badminton ===
Medal	Name	Event	Games
Silver	Dini Fitri; Inten Ratnasari	Women's doubles	2013 Islamic Solidarity Games
Silver	Rizky Antasari; Rohmat Abdul Rohman; Abu Bakar; Felix Eka; Ivan Gunardi; Danang Haryandika; Christeven Howard; Alwi Mahardika; Tedi Supriadi; I Putu Roy Danu Wira	Men's team	2013 Islamic Solidarity Games
Silver	Ravenska Cintya Adifta; Chintia Rhizta Andreti; Dini Fitri; Fitriani; Intan Dwi Jayanti; Nisak Puji Lestari; Inten Ratnasari; Rika Rositawati; Priskila Siahaya	Women's team	2013 Islamic Solidarity Games
Bronze	Rizky Antasari	Men's singles	2013 Islamic Solidarity Games
Bronze	Fitriani	Women's singles	2013 Islamic Solidarity Games
Bronze	Intan Dwi Jayanti	Women's singles	2013 Islamic Solidarity Games
Bronze	Danang Haryandika; Ivan Gunardi	Men's doubles	2013 Islamic Solidarity Games
Bronze	Nisak Puji Lestari; Ravenska Cintya Adifta	Women's doubles	2013 Islamic Solidarity Games
Bronze	Danang Haryandika; Inten Ratnasari	Mixed doubles	2013 Islamic Solidarity Games

=== Basketball ===
Medal	Name	Event	Games
Gold	Wulan Ayu Ningrum; Natasha Debby Christaline; Agustin Elya Gradita; Felicia Clarissa; Maharani Adhipuspitasari; Nur Rahmawati; Hanum Fasya; Jacklien Ibo; Marjorice Fedora Tsarine; Atty Juliani Achmad; Yuni Anggraeni; Shinta Ayu Ramadhani	Women's team	2013 Islamic Solidarity Games
Bronze	Kelly Purwanto; Bonanza Siregar; Kaleb Ramot Gemilang; Ruslan; Ferdinand Damanik; Rachmad Febri Utomo; Adhi Pratama Prasetyo; Xaverius Prawiro; Andakara Prastawa; Galank Gunawan; Respati Pamungkas; Christian Ronaldo Sitepu	Men's team	2013 Islamic Solidarity Games

=== Beach volleyball ===
Medal	Name	Event	Games
Gold	Dhita Juliana; Putu Dini Jasita Utami	Women	2013 Islamic Solidarity Games
Silver	Koko Prasetyo Darkuncoro; Ade Candra Rachmawan	Men	2013 Islamic Solidarity Games
Silver	Nanda Ragillia; Riska Dwi Andriani	Women	2013 Islamic Solidarity Games

=== Cycling - track ===
Medal	Name	Event	Games
Silver	Ayustina Delia Priatna	Women's omnium	2021 Islamic Solidarity Games

=== Diving ===
Medal	Name	Event	Games
Silver	Aldinsyah Putra Rafi	Men's 3 m springboard	2017 Islamic Solidarity Games
Silver	Tri Anggoro Priambodo; Aldinsyah Putra Rafi	Men's synchronized 3 m springboard	2017 Islamic Solidarity Games
Silver	Della Dinarsari Harimurti	Women's 10 m platform	2017 Islamic Solidarity Games
Bronze	Della Dinarsari Harimurti	Women's 3 m springboard	2017 Islamic Solidarity Games

=== Fencing ===
Medal	Name	Event	Games
Bronze	Alma Fauziah Ismail; Nazwa Salwa Nissa; Indah Nur Safarin	Women's team sabre	2025 Islamic Solidarity Games
Bronze	Putri Yanti; Siti Amalia; Jessika Amelia	Women's team foil	2025 Islamic Solidarity Games

=== Football ===
Medal	Name	Event	Games
Silver	Agung Supriyanto; Aldaier Makatindu; Syamsir Alam; Alfin Tuasalamony; Andik Vermansyah; Andri Ibo; Andritany Ardhiyasa; Bayu Gatra; David Laly; Dedi Kusnandar; Diego Michiels; Fandi Eko; Johan Alfarizi; Kurnia Meiga; Manahati Lestusen; Oktovianus Maniani; Ramdhani Lestaluhu; Rasyid Bakri; Shahar Ginanjar; Seftia Hadi; Sunarto; Syahrizal Syahbuddin; Syahroni	Men	2013 Islamic Solidarity Games

=== Gymnastics - artistic ===
Medal	Name	Event	Games
Bronze	Muhammad Aprizal	Men's vault	2017 Islamic Solidarity Games
Bronze	Rifda Irfanaluthfi	Women's vault	2017 Islamic Solidarity Games
Bronze	Rifda Irfanaluthfi; Tasza Miranda Devira; Armartiani	Women's team	2017 Islamic Solidarity Games

=== Karate ===
Medal	Name	Event	Games
Gold	Aswar; Fidelys Lolobua; Faisal Zainuddin	Men's team kata	2013 Islamic Solidarity Games
Bronze	Imam Tauhid Ragananda	Men's kumite –55 kg	2013 Islamic Solidarity Games
Bronze	Indonesia	Men's team kumite	2013 Islamic Solidarity Games
Bronze	Yulianti Syafrudin	Women's individual kata	2013 Islamic Solidarity Games
Bronze	Ayu Rahmawati; Siti Maryam; Eva Fitriani Setiawati	Women's team kata	2013 Islamic Solidarity Games
Bronze	Srunita Sari Sukatendel	Women's kumite –50 kg	2013 Islamic Solidarity Games
Bronze	Nova Sinaga	Women's kumite –55 kg	2013 Islamic Solidarity Games
Bronze	Cok Istri Agung Sanistyarani	Women's kumite –61 kg	2013 Islamic Solidarity Games
Bronze	Indonesia	Women's team kumite	2013 Islamic Solidarity Games
Bronze	Sisilia Agustiani Ora	Women's individual kata	2017 Islamic Solidarity Games
Bronze	Cok Istri Agung Sanistyarani	Women's kumite –55 kg	2017 Islamic Solidarity Games
Bronze	Ahmad Zigi Zaresta Yuda	Men's individual kata	2021 Islamic Solidarity Games
Bronze	Krisda Putri Aprilia	Women's individual kata	2021 Islamic Solidarity Games

=== Kickboxing ===
Medal	Name	Event	Games
Bronze	Diandra Ariesta Pieter	Women's full contact 56 kg	2021 Islamic Solidarity Games
Bronze	Amanda La Loupatty	Women's low kick 52 kg	2021 Islamic Solidarity Games

=== Swimming ===
Medal	Name	Event	Games
Gold	I Gede Siman Sudartawa	Men's 50 m backstroke	2013 Islamic Solidarity Games
Gold	I Gede Siman Sudartawa	Men's 100 m backstroke	2013 Islamic Solidarity Games
Gold	Triady Fauzi Sidiq	Men's 50 m butterfly	2013 Islamic Solidarity Games
Gold	Triady Fauzi Sidiq	Men's 100 m butterfly	2013 Islamic Solidarity Games
Gold	Triady Fauzi Sidiq	Men's 200 m butterfly	2013 Islamic Solidarity Games
Gold	Monalisa Arieswati	Women's 200 m butterfly	2013 Islamic Solidarity Games
Gold	I Gede Siman Sudartawa	Men's 50 m backstroke	2017 Islamic Solidarity Games
Gold	I Gede Siman Sudartawa	Men's 100 m backstroke	2017 Islamic Solidarity Games
Gold	Gagarin Nathaniel	Men's 200 m breaststroke	2017 Islamic Solidarity Games
Gold	Adellia	Women's 200 m breaststroke	2025 Islamic Solidarity Games
Silver	I Gede Siman Sudartawa	Men's 200 m backstroke	2013 Islamic Solidarity Games
Silver	Dennis Josua Tiwa	Men's 100 m breastsroke	2013 Islamic Solidarity Games
Silver	I Gede Siman Sudartawa; Dennis Josua Tiwa; Triady Fauzi Sidiq; Alexis Wijaya Ohmar	Men's 4 × 100 m medley relay	2013 Islamic Solidarity Games
Silver	Enny Susilawati Margono	Women's 50 m freestyle	2013 Islamic Solidarity Games
Silver	Raina Ramdhani	Women's 1500 m freestyle	2013 Islamic Solidarity Games
Silver	Yessy Yosaputra	Women's 100 m backstroke	2013 Islamic Solidarity Games
Silver	Yessy Yosaputra	Women's 200 m backstroke	2013 Islamic Solidarity Games
Silver	Aflah Fadlan Prawira	Men's 400 m freestyle	2017 Islamic Solidarity Games
Silver	Aflah Fadlan Prawira	Men's 800 m freestyle	2017 Islamic Solidarity Games
Silver	Aflah Fadlan Prawira	Men's 1500 m freestyle	2017 Islamic Solidarity Games
Silver	Triady Fauzi Sidiq	Men's 200 m individual medley	2017 Islamic Solidarity Games
Silver	Raymond Sumitra Lukman; Aflah Fadlan Prawira; Ricky Anggawijaya; Triady Fauzi Sidiq	Men's 4 × 100 m freestyle relay	2017 Islamic Solidarity Games
Silver	Aflah Fadlan Prawira; Putra Muhammad Randa; Ricky Anggawijaya; Triady Fauzi Sidiq	Men's 4 × 200 m freestyle relay	2017 Islamic Solidarity Games
Silver	I Gede Siman Sudartawa; Gagarin Nathaniel; Triady Fauzi Sidiq; Raymond Sumitra Lukman	Men's 4 × 100 m medley relay	2017 Islamic Solidarity Games
Silver	Anandia Evato	Women's 200 m breaststroke	2017 Islamic Solidarity Games
Silver	Adinda Larasati Dewi Kirana	Women's 100 m butterfly	2017 Islamic Solidarity Games
Silver	Adinda Larasati Dewi Kirana	Women's 200 m butterfly	2017 Islamic Solidarity Games
Silver	Ressa Kania Dewi	Women's 800 m freestyle	2017 Islamic Solidarity Games
Silver	Raina Ramdhani	Women's 1500 m freestyle	2017 Islamic Solidarity Games
Silver	Ressa Kania Dewi	Women's 200 m individual medley	2017 Islamic Solidarity Games
Silver	Azzahra Permatahani	Women's 400 m individual medley	2017 Islamic Solidarity Games
Silver	Patricia Yosita Hapsari; Nurul Fajar Fitriyati; Ressa Kania Dewi; Sagita Putri Krisdewanti	Women's 4 × 100 m freestyle relay	2017 Islamic Solidarity Games
Silver	Raina Ramdhani; Ressa Kania Dewi; Sagita Putri Krisdewanti; Patricia Yosita Hapsari	Women's 4 × 200 m freestyle relay	2017 Islamic Solidarity Games
Silver	Nurul Fajar Fitriyati; Anandia Evato; Adinda Larasati Dewi Kirana; Patricia Yosita Hapsari	Women's 4 × 100 m medley relay	2017 Islamic Solidarity Games
Silver	Azzahra Permatahani; Prada Hanan Farmadini; Adinda Larasati Dewi Kirana; Angel Gabriela Yus	Women's 4 × 100 m freestyle relay	2021 Islamic Solidarity Games
Silver	Azzahra Permatahani; Prada Hanan Farmadini; Adinda Larasati Dewi Kirana; Angel Gabriela Yus	Women's 4 × 200 m freestyle relay	2021 Islamic Solidarity Games
Silver	Adellia	Women's 100 m breaststroke	2025 Islamic Solidarity Games
Silver	Jason Donovan Yusuf; Joe Aditya Wijaya Kurniawan; Nadia Aisha Nurazmi; Azzahra Permatahani	Mixed 4 × 100 m freestyle relay	2025 Islamic Solidarity Games
Silver	Azzahra Permatahani	Women's 200 m individual medley	2025 Islamic Solidarity Games
Silver	Farrel Armandio Tangkas; Muhammad Dwiky Raharjo; Azzahra Permatahani; Nadia Aisha Nurazmi	Mixed 4 × 100 m medley relay	2025 Islamic Solidarity Games
Silver	Flairene Candrea; Adellia; Azzahra Permatahani; Nadia Aisha Nurazmi	Women's 4 × 100 m medley relay	2025 Islamic Solidarity Games
Bronze	Triady Fauzi Sidiq; Putera Muhammad Randa; Alexis Wijaya Ohmar; Satrio Bagaskara	Men's 4 × 100 m freestyle relay	2013 Islamic Solidarity Games
Bronze	Raina Ramdhani	Women's 400 m freestyle	2013 Islamic Solidarity Games
Bronze	Raina Ramdhani	Women's 800 m freestyle	2013 Islamic Solidarity Games
Bronze	Nurul Fajar Fitriyati	Women's 50 m backstroke	2013 Islamic Solidarity Games
Bronze	Nurul Fajar Fitriyati	Women's 100 m backstroke	2013 Islamic Solidarity Games
Bronze	Ressa Kania Dewi; Raina Ramdhani; Kathriana Mella Gustianjani; Enny Susilawati Margono	Women's 4 × 100 m freestyle relay	2013 Islamic Solidarity Games
Bronze	Kathriana Mella Gustianjani; Iffy Nadia Fahmiruwhanti; Ressa Kania Dewi; Raina Ramdhani	Women's 4 × 200 m freestyle relay	2013 Islamic Solidarity Games
Bronze	Triady Fauzi Sidiq	Men's 50 m freestyle	2017 Islamic Solidarity Games
Bronze	Ricky Anggawijaya	Men's 200 m backstroke	2017 Islamic Solidarity Games
Bronze	Indra Gunawan	Men's 50 m breaststroke	2017 Islamic Solidarity Games
Bronze	Triady Fauzi Sidiq	Men's 100 m butterfly	2017 Islamic Solidarity Games
Bronze	Aflah Fadlan Prawira	Men's 400 m individual medley	2017 Islamic Solidarity Games
Bronze	Sagita Putri Krisdewanti	Women's 200 m freestyle	2017 Islamic Solidarity Games
Bronze	Ressa Kania Dewi	Women's 400 m freestyle	2017 Islamic Solidarity Games
Bronze	Raina Ramdhani	Women's 800 m freestyle	2017 Islamic Solidarity Games
Bronze	Nurul Fajar Fitriyati	Women's 200 m backstroke	2017 Islamic Solidarity Games
Bronze	Anandia Evato	Women's 50 m breaststroke	2017 Islamic Solidarity Games
Bronze	Anandia Evato	Women's 100 m breaststroke	2017 Islamic Solidarity Games
Bronze	Nurul Fajar Fitriyati	Women's 50 m butterfly	2017 Islamic Solidarity Games
Bronze	Ressa Kania Dewi	Women's 400 m individual medley	2017 Islamic Solidarity Games
Bronze	Aflah Fadlan Prawira	Men's 800 m freestyle	2021 Islamic Solidarity Games
Bronze	Aflah Fadlan Prawira	Men's 1500 m freestyle	2021 Islamic Solidarity Games
Bronze	Joe Aditya Wijaya Kurniawan; Erick Ahmad Fathoni; Farrel Armandio Tangkas; Aflah Fadlan Prawira	Men's 4 × 200 m freestyle relay	2021 Islamic Solidarity Games
Bronze	Prada Hanan Farmadini	Women's 200 m freestyle	2021 Islamic Solidarity Games
Bronze	Prada Hanan Farmadini	Women's 400 m freestyle	2021 Islamic Solidarity Games
Bronze	Izzy Dwifaiva Hefrisyanthi	Women's 800 m freestyle	2021 Islamic Solidarity Games
Bronze	Izzy Dwifaiva Hefrisyanthi	Women's 1500 m freestyle	2021 Islamic Solidarity Games
Bronze	Azzahra Permatahani	Women's 200 m breaststroke	2021 Islamic Solidarity Games
Bronze	Adinda Larasati Dewi Kirana	Women's 200 m butterfly	2021 Islamic Solidarity Games
Bronze	Azzahra Permatahani	Women's 200 m individual medley	2021 Islamic Solidarity Games
Bronze	Azzahra Permatahani	Women's 400 m individual medley	2021 Islamic Solidarity Games
Bronze	Flairene Candrea; Azzahra Permatahani; Adinda Larasati Dewi Kirana; Angel Gabriela Yus	Women's 4 × 100 m medley relay	2021 Islamic Solidarity Games
Bronze	Nadia Aisha Nurazmi	Women's 50 m freestyle	2025 Islamic Solidarity Games
Bronze	Flairene Candrea	Women's 100 m backstroke	2025 Islamic Solidarity Games
Bronze	Farrel Armandio Tangkas; Muhammad Dwiky Raharjo; Joe Aditya Wijaya Kurniawan; Jason Donovan Yusuf	Men's 4 × 100 m medley relay	2025 Islamic Solidarity Games
Bronze	Flairene Candrea	Women's 50 m backstroke	2025 Islamic Solidarity Games
Bronze	Jason Donovan Yusuf	Men's 50 m backstroke	2025 Islamic Solidarity Games
Bronze	Nadia Aisha Nurazmi; Azzahra Permatahani; Flairene Candrea; Adellia	Women's 4 × 100 m freestyle relay	2025 Islamic Solidarity Games

=== Taekwondo ===
Medal	Name	Event	Games
Gold	Basuki Nugroho	Men's welterweight –78 kg	2005 Islamic Solidarity Games
Gold	Maulana Haidir	Men's individual poomsae	2013 Islamic Solidarity Games
Gold	Aggie Seftyan Prasbowo	Men's flyweight –58 kg	2013 Islamic Solidarity Games
Gold	Aghniny Haque	Women's finweight –46 kg	2013 Islamic Solidarity Games
Silver	Defia Rosmaniar	Women's individual poomsae	2013 Islamic Solidarity Games
Silver	Maulana Haidir; Abdurrahman Wahyu; Fazza Fitracahyo	Men's team poomsae	2013 Islamic Solidarity Games
Silver	Abdurrahman Wahyu; Defia Rosmaniar	Mixed team poomsae	2013 Islamic Solidarity Games
Silver	Jehabut Selviana	Women's middleweight –73 kg	2013 Islamic Solidarity Games
Silver	Dhean Titania Fajrin	Women's finweight –46 kg	2017 Islamic Solidarity Games
Bronze	Satriyo Rahadhani	Men's flyweight –58 kg	2005 Islamic Solidarity Games
Bronze	Defia Rosmaniar; Mutiara Habiba; Muttaqoh Khoirun Nisa	Women's team poomsae	2013 Islamic Solidarity Games
Bronze	Junaidi Alfred Blegur	Men's featherweight –68 kg	2013 Islamic Solidarity Games
Bronze	Basuki Nugroho	Men's middleweight –87 kg	2013 Islamic Solidarity Games
Bronze	Eka Sahara	Women's heavyweight +73 kg	2013 Islamic Solidarity Games
Bronze	Dinggo Ardian Prayogo	Men's featherweight –68 kg	2017 Islamic Solidarity Games
Bronze	Mariska Halinda	Women's bantamweight –53 kg	2017 Islamic Solidarity Games

=== Tennis ===
Medal	Name	Event	Games
Gold	Christopher Rungkat	Men's singles	2013 Islamic Solidarity Games
Gold	Christopher Rungkat; Elbert Sie	Men's doubles	2013 Islamic Solidarity Games
Gold	Lavinia Tananta; Cynthia Melita	Women's doubles	2013 Islamic Solidarity Games
Gold	Elbert Sie; Christopher Rungkat; David Agung Susanto; Wisnu Adi Nugroho	Men's team	2013 Islamic Solidarity Games
Gold	Lavinia Tananta; Cynthia Melita; Mia Sacca; Heravita Mediana	Women's team	2013 Islamic Solidarity Games
Silver	Prima Simpatiaji; Suwandi	Men's doubles	2005 Islamic Solidarity Games
Silver	Lavinia Tananta	Women's singles	2013 Islamic Solidarity Games
Silver	Wisnu Adi Nugroho; David Agung Susanto	Men's doubles	2013 Islamic Solidarity Games
Silver	Mia Sacca; Heravita Mediana	Women's doubles	2013 Islamic Solidarity Games
Bronze	Prima Simpatiaji; Suwandi; Sunu Wahyu Trijati	Men's team	2005 Islamic Solidarity Games

=== Weightlifting ===
Medal	Name	Event	Games
Gold	Eko Yuli Irawan	Men's 62 kg	2013 Islamic Solidarity Games
Gold	Deni	Men's 69 kg	2013 Islamic Solidarity Games
Gold	Sri Wahyuni Agustiani	Women's 48 kg	2013 Islamic Solidarity Games
Gold	Citra Febrianti	Women's 53 kg	2013 Islamic Solidarity Games
Gold	Okta Dwi Pramita	Women's 58 kg	2013 Islamic Solidarity Games
Gold	Sinta Darmariani	Women's 63 kg	2013 Islamic Solidarity Games
Gold	Surahmat Wijoyo	Men's 56 kg	2017 Islamic Solidarity Games
Gold	Eko Yuli Irawan	Men's 62 kg	2017 Islamic Solidarity Games
Gold	Sri Wahyuni Agustiani	Women's 48 kg	2017 Islamic Solidarity Games
Gold	Ricko Saputra	Men's 61 kg – snatch	2021 Islamic Solidarity Games
Gold	Ricko Saputra	Men's 61 kg – clean & jerk	2021 Islamic Solidarity Games
Gold	Ricko Saputra	Men's 61 kg – total	2021 Islamic Solidarity Games
Gold	Rizki Juniansyah	Men's 73 kg – snatch	2021 Islamic Solidarity Games
Gold	Rizki Juniansyah	Men's 73 kg – clean & jerk	2021 Islamic Solidarity Games
Gold	Rizki Juniansyah	Men's 73 kg – total	2021 Islamic Solidarity Games
Gold	Siti Nafisatul Hariroh	Women's 45 kg – snatch	2021 Islamic Solidarity Games
Gold	Siti Nafisatul Hariroh	Women's 45 kg – clean & jerk	2021 Islamic Solidarity Games
Gold	Siti Nafisatul Hariroh	Women's 45 kg – total	2021 Islamic Solidarity Games
Gold	Natasya Beteyob	Women's 55 kg – clean & jerk	2021 Islamic Solidarity Games
Gold	Natasya Beteyob	Women's 55 kg – total	2021 Islamic Solidarity Games
Gold	Tsabitha Alfiah Ramadani	Women's 64 kg – snatch	2021 Islamic Solidarity Games
Gold	Muhammad Husni	Men's 60 kg – snatch	2025 Islamic Solidarity Games
Gold	Muhammad Husni	Men's 60 kg – clean & jerk	2025 Islamic Solidarity Games
Gold	Muhammad Husni	Men's 60 kg – total	2025 Islamic Solidarity Games
Silver	Syarah Anggraini	Women's 53 kg	2013 Islamic Solidarity Games
Silver	Siti Sarah	Women's 69 kg	2013 Islamic Solidarity Games
Silver	Muhammad Purkon	Men's 56 kg	2017 Islamic Solidarity Games
Silver	Dewi Safitri	Women's 53 kg	2017 Islamic Solidarity Games
Silver	Acchedya Jagaddhita	Women's 58 kg	2017 Islamic Solidarity Games
Silver	Nurul Akmal	Women's +90 kg	2017 Islamic Solidarity Games
Silver	Mohammad Yasin	Men's 67 kg – snatch	2021 Islamic Solidarity Games
Silver	Rahmat Erwin Abdullah	Men's 81 kg – clean & jerk	2021 Islamic Solidarity Games
Silver	Rahmat Erwin Abdullah	Men's 81 kg – total	2021 Islamic Solidarity Games
Silver	Natasya Beteyob	Women's 55 kg – snatch	2021 Islamic Solidarity Games
Silver	Nelly	Women's 59 kg – clean & jerk	2021 Islamic Solidarity Games
Silver	Tsabitha Alfiah Ramadani	Women's 64 kg – total	2021 Islamic Solidarity Games
Silver	Restu Anggi	Women's 71 kg – clean & jerk	2021 Islamic Solidarity Games
Silver	Leonardo Adventino Geovani	Men's 65 kg – snatch	2025 Islamic Solidarity Games
Silver	Tita Nurcahya Melyani	Women's 48 kg – snatch	2025 Islamic Solidarity Games
Silver	Tita Nurcahya Melyani	Women's 48 kg – clean & jerk	2025 Islamic Solidarity Games
Silver	Tita Nurcahya Melyani	Women's 48 kg – total	2025 Islamic Solidarity Games
Silver	Basilia Bamerop Ninggan	Women's 53 kg – snatch	2025 Islamic Solidarity Games
Silver	Basilia Bamerop Ninggan	Women's 53 kg – clean & jerk	2025 Islamic Solidarity Games
Silver	Basilia Bamerop Ninggan	Women's 53 kg – total	2025 Islamic Solidarity Games
Bronze	Muhammad Purkon	Men's 56 kg	2013 Islamic Solidarity Games
Bronze	Dwi Atika Sari	Women's 63 kg	2013 Islamic Solidarity Games
Bronze	Satrio Adi Nugroho	Men's 55 kg – snatch	2021 Islamic Solidarity Games
Bronze	Satrio Adi Nugroho	Men's 55 kg – clean & jerk	2021 Islamic Solidarity Games
Bronze	Satrio Adi Nugroho	Men's 55 kg – total	2021 Islamic Solidarity Games
Bronze	Nelly	Women's 59 kg – total	2021 Islamic Solidarity Games
Bronze	Tsabitha Alfiah Ramadani	Women's 64 kg – clean & jerk	2021 Islamic Solidarity Games
Bronze	Restu Anggi	Women's 71 kg – snatch	2021 Islamic Solidarity Games
Bronze	Restu Anggi	Women's 71 kg – total	2021 Islamic Solidarity Games
Bronze	Nurul Akmal	Women's +87 kg – snatch	2021 Islamic Solidarity Games
Bronze	Nurul Akmal	Women's +87 kg – clean & jerk	2021 Islamic Solidarity Games
Bronze	Nurul Akmal	Women's +87 kg – total	2021 Islamic Solidarity Games
Bronze	Nadita Aprilia	Women's 63 kg – clean & jerk	2025 Islamic Solidarity Games

=== Wushu ===
Medal	Name	Event	Games
Gold	Achmad Hulaefi	Men's daoshu & gunshu	2013 Islamic Solidarity Games
Gold	Fredy Wijaya	Men's taijiquan	2013 Islamic Solidarity Games
Gold	Marthen Tangdilallo	Men's taijijian	2013 Islamic Solidarity Games
Gold	Ade Permana	Men's 48 kg	2013 Islamic Solidarity Games
Gold	Hendrik Tarigan	Men's 60 kg	2013 Islamic Solidarity Games
Gold	Juwita Niza Wasni	Women's nanquan	2013 Islamic Solidarity Games
Gold	Ivana Ardelia Irmanto	Women's nandao & nangun	2013 Islamic Solidarity Games
Gold	Lindswell Kwok	Women's taijiquan	2013 Islamic Solidarity Games
Gold	Lindswell Kwok	Women's taijijian	2013 Islamic Solidarity Games
Silver	Marthen Tangdilallo	Men's taijiquan	2013 Islamic Solidarity Games
Silver	Fredy Wijaya	Men's taijijian	2013 Islamic Solidarity Games
Silver	Gunawan	Men's 52 kg	2013 Islamic Solidarity Games
Silver	Harinto Jaya Putra	Men's 56 kg	2013 Islamic Solidarity Games
Silver	Ivana Ardelia Irmanto	Women's nanquan	2013 Islamic Solidarity Games
Silver	Juwita Niza Wasni	Women's nandao & nangun	2013 Islamic Solidarity Games
Bronze	Aldy Lukman	Men's daoshu & gunshu	2013 Islamic Solidarity Games
Bronze	Yusuf Widiyanto	Men's 56 kg	2017 Islamic Solidarity Games
Bronze	Puja Riyaya	Men's 70 kg	2017 Islamic Solidarity Games

== Podium sweeps ==
Year	Sport	Event	Gold	Silver	Bronze
2013	Archery	Women's individual recurve	Ika Yuliana Rochmawati	Diananda Choirunisa	Titik Kusuma Wardani
