= Turkey at the 2005 Islamic Solidarity Games =

- IOC code: TUR
- NOC: Turkish Olympic Committee

in Mecca, Saudi Arabia
- Medals: Gold 1 Silver 3 Bronze 3 Total 7

Islamic Solidarity Games appearances (overview)
- 2005; 2013; 2017; 2021; 2025

Turkey participated in the 2005 Islamic Solidarity Games held in Mecca, Saudi Arabia from 8 to 20 April 2005.

== Medalists ==
Medal	Name	Sport	Event	Date
Gold	Yusuf Başer	Karate	Men's Open	14 April
Silver	Serkan Aydın	Swimming	Men's 200 m freestyle	12 April
Silver	Aytekin Mindan	Swimming	Men's 400 m freestyle	12 April
Silver	Serdar Akın	Taekwondo	Men's −72 kg	14 April
Bronze	4 × 100 m medley relay team	Swimming	4 × 100 m medley relay	13 April
Bronze	Yavuz Karamollaoğlu	Karate	Men's −75 kg	14 April
Bronze	Haluk Akkoyun; Barış Ergüden	Tennis	Men's doubles	19 April

Medals by sport
Sport	1st place, gold medalist(s)	2nd place, silver medalist(s)	3rd place, bronze medalist(s)	Total
Karate	1	0	1	2
Swimming	0	2	1	3
Taekwondo	0	1	0	1
Tennis	0	0	1	1
Total	1	3	3	7
