= 2013 in religion =

This is a timeline of events during the year 2013 which relate to religion.

== Events ==
- 19 March – Pope Francis is inaugurated.
- 22 September to 1 October – The 3rd Islamic Solidarity Games are held in Palembang, Indonesia.
