= Defia Rosmaniar =

Indonesian taekwondo practitioner

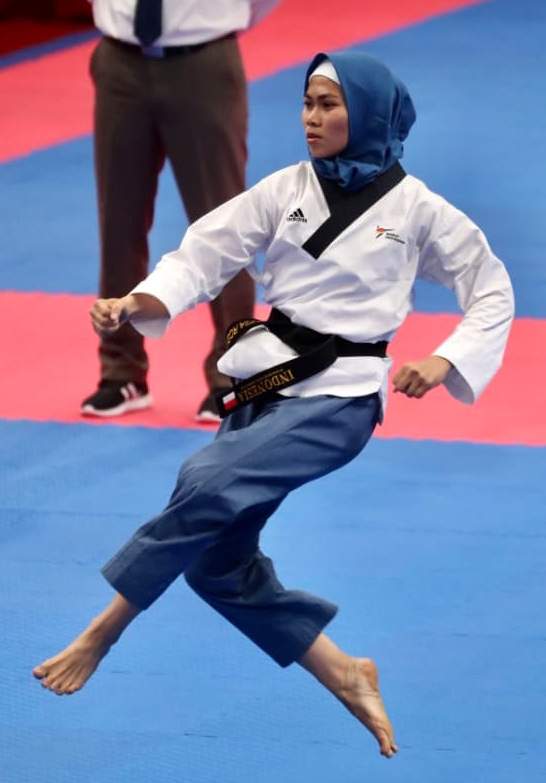
- Rosmaniar at the 2018 Asian Games

Personal information
- Nationality: Indonesian
- Born: 25 May 1995 (age 31) Bogor, West Java, Indonesia
- Education: State University of Jakarta
- Height: 1.67 m (5 ft 6 in)
- Weight: 51 kg (112 lb)

Sport
- Sport: Taekwondo
- Event: Poomsae
- Coached by: Syamsudin; Solah Basuni
Medal record
Women's taekwondo
Representing Indonesia
Asian Games
Gold medal – first place	2018 Jakarta–Palembang	Individual
Asian Indoor and Martial Arts Games
Silver medal – second place	2017 Ashgabat	Women's team
Bronze medal – third place	2017 Ashgabat	Individual
Asian Championships
Gold medal – first place	2018 Ho Chi Minh City	Individual
Islamic Solidarity Games
Silver medal – second place	2013 Palembang	Individual
Silver medal – second place	2013 Palembang	Mixed pairs
Bronze medal – third place	2013 Palembang	Women's team
SEA Games
Bronze medal – third place	2013 Naypyidaw	Women's team
Bronze medal – third place	2013 Naypyidaw	Mixed pairs
Bronze medal – third place	2017 Kuala Lumpur	Women's team
Bronze medal – third place	2019 Philippines	Women's team
Bronze medal – third place	2019 Philippines	Mixed pairs
Bronze medal – third place	2021 Vietnam	Individual
ASEAN University Games
Silver medal – second place	2014 Palembang	Women's team

Defia Rosmaniar (born 25 May 1995) is an Indonesian taekwondo practitioner. She won medals at several multi-sport events, including Asian Games, Asian Indoor and Martial Arts Games, SEA Games and Islamic Solidarity Games. She won Indonesia's first gold medal at the 2018 Asian Games, held in Indonesia.

== Career ==
Defia Rosmaniar took up taekwondo in 2007 following her brother. She entered into the 2013 SEA Games, her first international multi-sport event at the age of 18 and went onto secure bronze medals in women's team and mixed pair events. She represented Indonesia at the 2017 Asian Indoor and Martial Arts Games claiming a bronze medal in the women's individual event and was part of the Indonesian women's squad which secured silver in the team event.

Rosmaniar won a gold medal in the women's poomsae individual event, which became the first medal to be earned by the host nation, Indonesia, at the 2018 Asian Games.

== Awards and nominations ==
Award	Year	Category	Result	Ref.
Golden Award SIWO PWI	2019	Best Female Athlete	Nominated	
Indonesian Sport Awards	2018	Favorite Female Athlete	Nominated	
