= Juwita Niza Wasni =

Indonesian wushu practitioner

Personal information
- Born: August 8, 1996 (age 29) Jakarta, Indonesia
- Height: 1.56 m (5 ft 1 in)
- Weight: 59 kg (130 lb)

Sport
- Sport: Wushu
- Events: Nanquan, Nandao, Nangun
- Team: Indonesia wushu team
Medal record
Women's wushu taolu
Representing Indonesia
World Championships
Gold medal – first place	2015 Jakarta	Nandao
Gold medal – first place	2015 Jakarta	Nangun
Silver medal – second place	2017 Kazan	Nangun
Bronze medal – third place	2015 Jakarta	Nanquan
Bronze medal – third place	2017 Kazan	Nandao
Taolu World Cup
Gold medal – first place	2016 Fuzhou	Nandao
Gold medal – first place	2016 Fuzhou	Nangun
Asian Games
Gold medal – first place	2014 Incheon	Nanquan
Islamic Solidarity Games
Gold medal – first place	2013 Palembang	Nanquan
Silver medal – second place	2013 Palembang	Nandao+Nangun
SEA Games
Gold medal – first place	2013 Naypyidaw	Nangun
Silver medal – second place	2015 Singapore	Nanquan+Nandao
Silver medal – second place	2017 Kuala Lumpur	Nandao+Nangun
Bronze medal – third place	2013 Naypyidaw	Nandao
ASEAN University Games
Gold medal – first place	2014 Palembang	Nanquan

Juwita Niza Wasni (born August 8, 1996) is a retired wushu taolu athlete from Indonesia. She is a two-time world champion, double gold medalist at the Taolu World Cup, and a four-time medalist at the SEA Games. At the 2014 Asian Games, she won the gold medal in women's nanquan due to the doping disqualification of Malaysian athlete Tai Cheau Xuen.

== See also ==
- List of Asian Games medalists in wushu
