= Archery at the 2013 Islamic Solidarity Games =

Islamic Solidarity Games

- Venue: Jakabaring Archery Range
- Location: Indonesia, Palembang
- Dates: 24–30 September

Archery at the 2013 Islamic Solidarity Games is held in Jakabaring Archery Range, Palembang, Indonesia from 24 September to 30 September 2013.

== Medalists ==
=== Recurve ===
Event	Gold	Silver	Bronze
Men's individual	Ahmed El-Nemr; Egypt	Emdadul Haque Milon; Bangladesh	Ibrahim Sabry; Egypt
Men's team	Egypt; Ibrahim Sabry; Hady El-Kholosy; Ahmed El-Nemr	Azerbaijan; Roman Vengerov; Aleksey Korpin; Zaur Gahramanov	Iran; Behzad Pakzad; Rouzbeh Nazarian; Gholamreza Rahimi
Women's individual	Ika Yuliana Rochmawati; Indonesia	Diananda Choirunisa; Indonesia	Titik Kusuma Wardani; Indonesia
Women's team	Egypt; Amira Mansour; Aya Kamel; Nada Kamel	Indonesia; Ika Yuliana Rochmawati; Titik Kusuma Wardani; Diananda Choirunisa	Iran; Sareh Asadi; Maryam Mahmoudi; Ameneh Marzoughi
Mixed team	Indonesia; Riau Ega Agatha; Ika Yuliana Rochmawati	Egypt; Ibrahim Sabry; Amira Mansour	Malaysia; Nazir Omar; Ng Sui Kim

=== Compound ===
Event	Gold	Silver	Bronze
Men's individual	Esmaeil Ebadi; Iran	Amir Kazempour; Iran	Hamzeh Nekouei; Iran
Men's team	Iran; Amir Kazempour; Esmaeil Ebadi; Hamzeh Nekouei	Indonesia; I Gusti Nyoman Puruhito; Catur Wuri; Adi Nugroho	Qatar; Abdulaziz Al-Abadi; Ahmed Al-Abadi; Israf Khan
Women's individual	Nor Rizah Ishak; Malaysia	Saritha Cham Nong; Malaysia	Minoo Abedi; Iran
Women's team	Malaysia; Saritha Cham Nong; Nor Rizah Ishak; Norhayati Al-Madiah Hashim	Iran; Minoo Abedi; Mahtab Parsamehr; Sara Tebian	Indonesia; Rona Siska Sari; Dellie Threesyadinda; Sri Ranti
Mixed team	Malaysia; Mohd Firdaus Isa; Nor Rizah Ishak	Iran; Amir Kazempour; Mahtab Parsamehr	Indonesia; I Gusti Nyoman Puruhito; Rona Siska Sari

== Medal table ==
Rank	Nation	Gold	Silver	Bronze	Total
1	Egypt (EGY)	3	1	1	5
1	Malaysia (MAS)	3	1	1	5
3	Iran (IRI)	2	3	4	9
4	Indonesia (INA)	2	3	3	8
5	Azerbaijan (AZE)	0	1	0	1
5	Bangladesh (BAN)	0	1	0	1
7	Qatar (QAT)	0	0	1	1
Totals (7 entries)		10	10	10	30
