= Ece Yaşar =

Turkish karateka (born 1994)

- Born: July 17, 1994 (age 31); Ankara, Turkey
- Division: -61 kg
- Style: Karate
- Team: TED Ankara Kolejliler
- Rank: 35th (World -61 kg)

Other information
- University: Hacettepe University

Ece Yaşar
Medal record

Women's Karate

Representing Turkey

European Championships
Bronze medal – third place	2012 Adeje	Kumite −61 kg

Islamic Solidarity Games
Bronze medal – third place	2013 Palembang	Kumite −61 kg

Ece Yaşar (born July 17, 1994) is a Turkish female karateka competing currently in the kumite -61 kg division. She competes for TED Ankara Kolejliler.

Yaşar is a student at the sports academy of Hacettepe University in Ankara.

She won a gold medal at the 16th Balkan Children and Seniors Karate Championships in Herceg Novi, Montenegro in 2012. The same year, she won a bronze medal at the 47th European Karate Championships in Adeje, Spain, and later another bronze medal at the 2012 University World Karate Championships held in Bratislava, Slovakia.

She took the bronze medal in the -61 kg division at the 2013 Islamic Solidarity Games held in Palembang, Indonesia.

== Achievements ==
Year	Competition	Venue	Position	Event	Notes
Representing Turkey
2008	European Cadet and Junior Championships	Trieste, Italy	3rd place, bronze medalist(s)	Cadet kumite +57 kg	February 15–17
2010	U-21 European Cup	İzmir, Turkey	7th	Junior kumite -60 kg	February 7
2011	U-21 European Cup	Novi Sad, Serbia	1st place, gold medalist(s)	Junior kumite -60 kg	February 11–13
2011	46th European Championships	Zurich, Switzerland	7th	kumite -61 kg	May 6–8
2012	16th Balkan Children & Seniors Karate Championships	Herceg Novi, Montenegro	1st place, gold medalist(s)	kumite -61 kg	March 16
2012	16th Balkan Children & Seniors Karate Championships	Herceg Novi, Montenegro	3rd place, bronze medalist(s)	kumite team	March 16
2012	47th European Championships	Adeje, Spain	3rd place, bronze medalist(s)	kumite -61 kg	May 10
2012	8th University World Championship	Bratislava, Slovakia	3rd place, bronze medalist(s)	kumite -61 kg	July 12–15
2012	21st World Championships	Paris, France	5th	kumite -61 kg	November 21
2013	3rd Islamic Solidarity Games	Palembang, Indonesia	3rd place, bronze medalist(s)	kumite -61 kg	September 27
