= Wushu at the 2014 Asian Games – Women's nanquan & nandao =

Women's nanquan & nandao at the 2014 Asian Games
- Venue: Ganghwa Dolmens Gymnasium
- Dates: 20 September 2014
- Competitors: 14 from 11 nations

Medalists
gold medal	Juwita Niza Wasni	Indonesia
silver medal	Wei Hong	China
bronze medal	Ivana Ardelia Irmanto	Indonesia

The women's Nanquan / Nandao all-round competition at the 2014 Asian Games in Incheon, South Korea was held on 20 September at the Ganghwa Dolmens Gymnasium.

Tai Cheau Xuen tested positive for the stimulant sibutramine after winning the gold medal on September 20, the first day of competition, according to the Olympic Council of Asia (OCA). Tai was stripped of the gold medal and disqualified by the OCA after failing a dope test. An official statement announced by the Court of Arbitration for Sport that the appeal made by Malaysian contingent was dismissed. Tai's disqualification altered the medal allocation, with Indonesia's Juwita Niza Wasni promoted from silver to gold while China's Wei Hong move up to the silver medal and Ivana Ardelia Irmanto of Indonesia to the bronze model after finishing fourth overall.

== Schedule ==
All times are Korea Standard Time (UTC+09:00)

Date	Time	Event
Saturday, 20 September 2014	09:00	Nandao
Saturday, 20 September 2014	14:00	Nanquan

== Results ==
Legend

- DNS — Did not start

Rank	Athlete	Nandao	Nanquan	Total
1st place, gold medalist(s)	Juwita Niza Wasni (INA)	9.63	9.56	19.19
2nd place, silver medalist(s)	Wei Hong (CHN)	9.72	9.43	19.15
3rd place, bronze medalist(s)	Ivana Ardelia Irmanto (INA)	9.57	9.55	19.12
4	Tsai Wen-chuan (TPE)	9.60	9.49	19.09
5	Lin Chih-yu (TPE)	9.57	9.45	19.02
6	Yuen Ka Ying (HKG)	9.61	9.38	18.99
7	Lim Sung-eun (KOR)	9.51	9.39	18.90
8	Tan Dong Mei (MAC)	9.15	9.46	18.61
9	Erika Kojima (JPN)	9.40	9.07	18.47
10	Aint Mi Mi (MYA)	9.10	9.17	18.27
11	Diana Bong (MAS)	9.20	9.05	18.25
—	Mashvaa Rakhmanova (TJK)			DNS
—	Chuevue Naotuevue (LAO)			DNS
DQ	Tai Cheau Xuen (MAS)	9.62	9.61	~~19.23~~

- Tai Cheau Xuen of Malaysia originally won the gold medal, but was later disqualified after she tested positive for Sibutramine.
