= Citra Febrianti =

Indonesian weightlifter (born 1988)

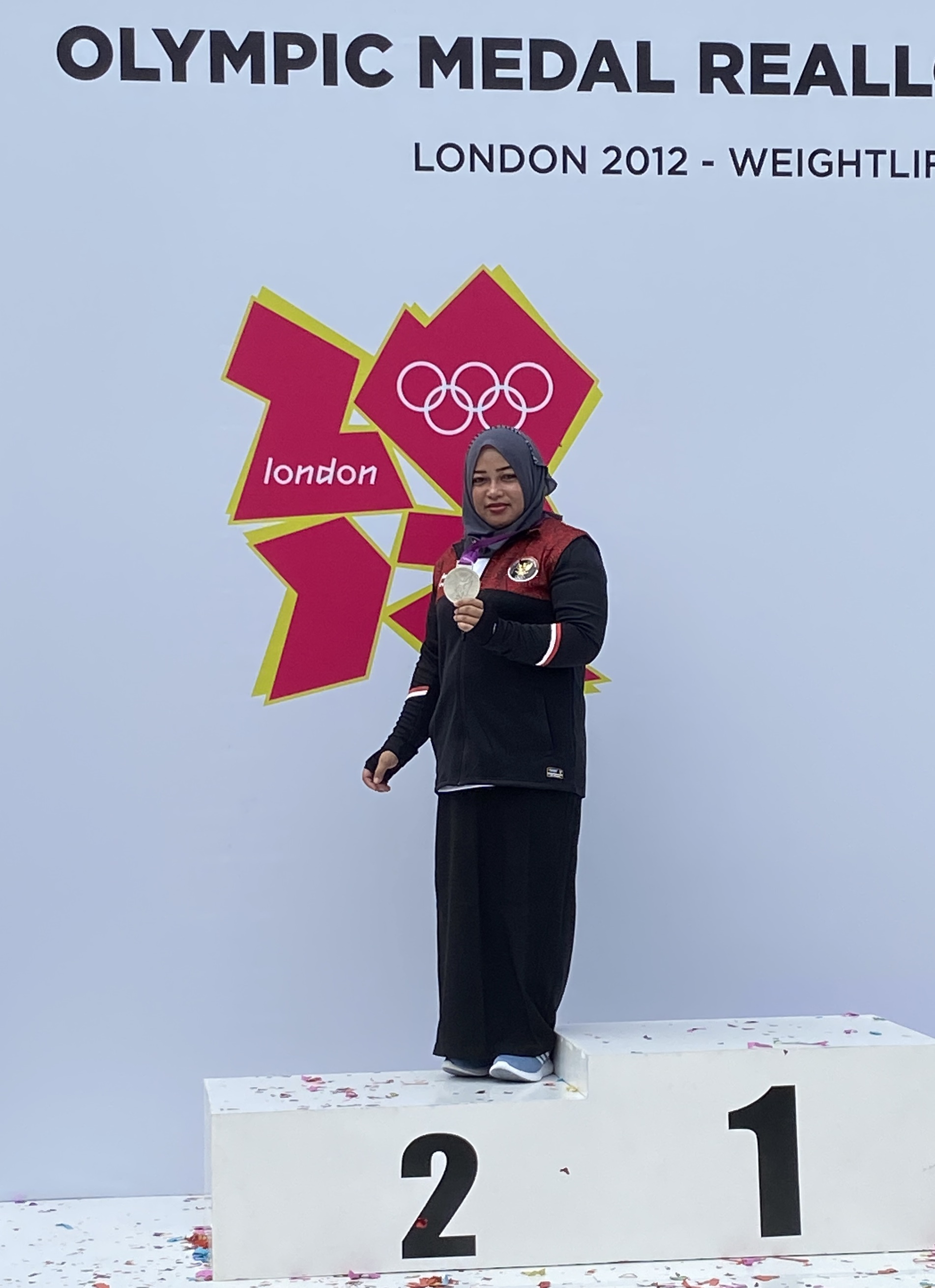

Personal information
- Born: 22 February 1988 (age 38) Pringsewu, Lampung, Indonesia

Sport
- Country: Indonesia
- Sport: Weightlifting
- Weight class: 53 kg
Medal record
Women's weightlifting
Representing Indonesia
Olympic Games
Silver medal – second place	2012 London	53 kg
Islamic Solidarity Games
Gold medal – first place	2013 Palembang	53 kg
SEA Games
Silver medal – second place	2011 Jakarta–Palembang	53 kg
Bronze medal – third place	2013 Naypyidaw	53 kg

Citra Febrianti (born 22 February 1988) is an Indonesian weightlifter who won the silver medal at the 2012 Summer Olympics in the –53 kg category. She originally finished fourth, but was promoted to second after gold medallist Zulfiya Chinshanlo and bronze medallist Cristina Iovu were both disqualified.

== Career ==
Citra Febrianti is ranked 4th in the featherweight category with a total of 206 kg lifted at the 2012 Summer Olympics before the disqualification for doping of Kazakh gold medalist Zulfiya Chinshanlo and then that of Moldovan bronze medalist Cristina Iovu in 2016.
