= Christopher Rungkat =

Indonesian tennis player

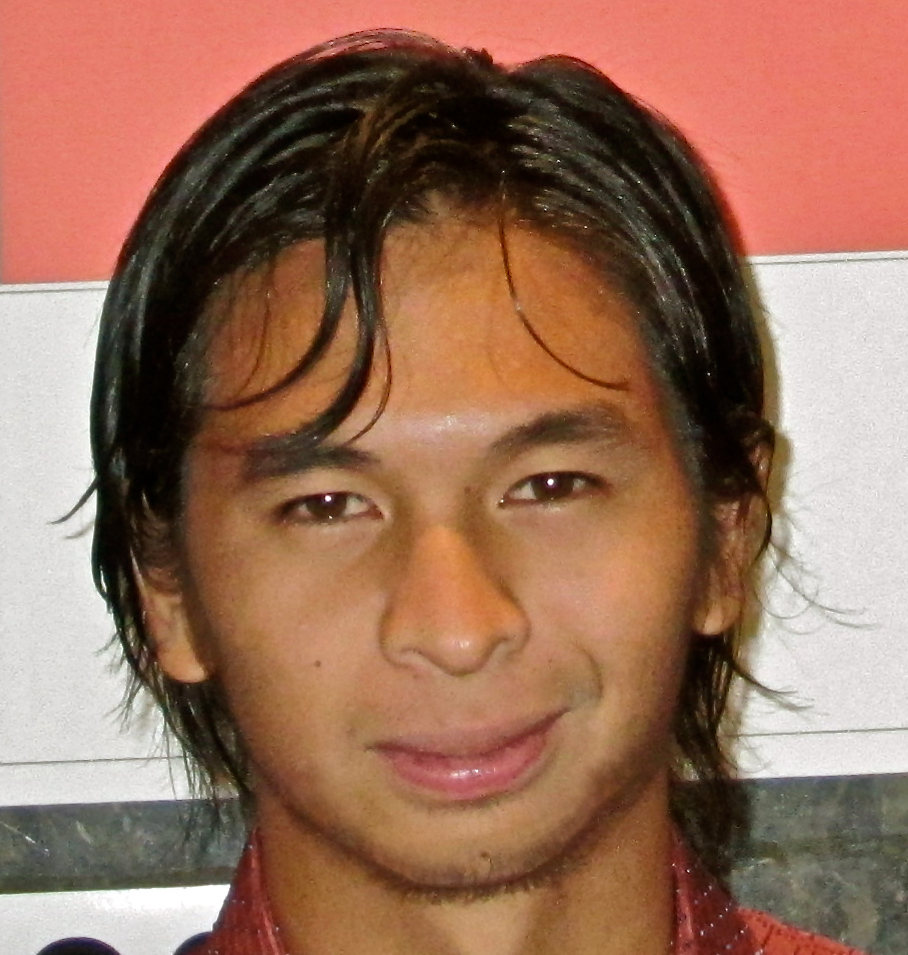
- Rungkat in July 2011
- Full name: Christopher Benjamin Rungkat
- Country (sports): Indonesia
- Residence: Jakarta, Indonesia
- Born: 14 January 1990 (age 36) Jakarta
- Height: 1.75 m (5 ft 9 in)
- Turned pro: 2007
- Plays: Right-handed (two-handed backhand)
- Coach: Robert Davis
- Prize money: US $295,117

Singles
- Career record: 24–12
- Career titles: 11 ITF
- Highest ranking: No. 241 (8 April 2013)

Grand Slam singles results
- Australian Open: Q1 (2013)

Doubles
- Career record: 26–21
- Career titles: 1 ATP
- Highest ranking: No. 68 (17 June 2019)
- Current ranking: No. 771 (6 April 2026)

Grand Slam doubles results
- Australian Open: 2R (2022)
- French Open: 2R (2019)
- Wimbledon: 1R (2019)
- US Open: 1R (2019)

Grand Slam mixed doubles results
- Wimbledon: 2R (2019)
Medal record
Men's tennis
Representing Indonesia
Asian Games
| Gold medal – first place | 2018 Jakarta–Palembang | Mixed doubles |
Islamic Solidarity Games
| Gold medal – first place | 2013 Palembang | Singles |
| Gold medal – first place | 2013 Palembang | Doubles |
| Gold medal – first place | 2013 Palembang | Team |
SEA Games
| Gold medal – first place | 2011 Jakarta–Palembang | Singles |
| Gold medal – first place | 2011 Jakarta–Palembang | Doubles |
| Gold medal – first place | 2011 Jakarta–Palembang | Team |
| Gold medal – first place | 2017 Kuala Lumpur | Singles |
| Gold medal – first place | 2019 Philippines | Mixed doubles |
| Gold medal – first place | 2021 Vietnam | Mixed doubles |
| Gold medal – first place | 2023 Cambodia | Mixed doubles |
| Gold medal – first place | 2025 Thailand | Team |
| Silver medal – second place | 2007 Nakhon Ratchasima | Team |
| Silver medal – second place | 2011 Jakarta–Palembang | Mixed doubles |
| Silver medal – second place | 2015 Singapore | Team |
| Silver medal – second place | 2017 Kuala Lumpur | Mixed doubles |
| Silver medal – second place | 2021 Vietnam | Team |
| Silver medal – second place | 2023 Cambodia | Doubles |
| Bronze medal – third place | 2007 Nakhon Ratchasima | Doubles |
| Bronze medal – third place | 2009 Vientiane | Doubles |
| Bronze medal – third place | 2009 Vientiane | Team |
| Bronze medal – third place | 2023 Cambodia | Team |
| Bronze medal – third place | 2025 Thailand | Doubles |
- Last updated on: 8 April 2026.

Christopher Benjamin Rungkat (born 14 January 1990) is an Indonesian tennis player. In 2008, he won the French Open 2008 Boys' Doubles Juniors title with Finnish player Henri Kontinen. He is the youngest ever Indonesian to be the All Indonesian Champion, and by the end of his junior career, he was awarded for Indonesian best promising athlete 2008.

Rungkat also reached the final of the 2008 US Open boys' event with Henri Kontinen. Rungkat is the first Indonesian to reach the US Open boys' final and to win the doubles title at the French Open.

In June 2010, he won the Tarakan Open International Men's Futures tournament, his first international tournament title since his professional debut in 2007. He won his maiden ATP Tour title in men's doubles, partnered with Swedish player André Göransson in February 2020, 13 years after turning professional.

== Personal life ==
He is the grandson of Benny Rungkat, former chairman of the Indonesian Air Carriers Association. Christopher's father, Michael Alexander Fritz Rungkat, is of Manadonese descent and his mother, Elfia Mirlianti, is Minang descent.

Christopher Rungkat partnered up with PocariID in 2007 for a project called Pocari Sweat Sport Science hoping to help Christopher maximize his performance.

== Career ==
Christopher Rungkat spent his junior career in Europe by playing on the European Junior Circuit and was trained in Tennis Val, Valencia, Spain. He is the second Asian male player to win a junior French Open doubles title, after Kei Nishikori. He was the winner of the men's singles title at the Tennis at the 2017 SEA Games in Kuala Lumpur.

A year later at the 2018 Asian Games in his home country, Rungkat was partnered up with Aldila Sutjiadi for the mixed doubles category in just two weeks, and was not targeted to grab any medals. However, they surprised with getting the gold medal after producing a couple of upsets and eventually beating Thai pair Sonchat Ratiwatana and Luksika Kumkhum in the end to get the gold medal.

He started 2019 with a title in with partner Hsieh Cheng-peng beating former world No. 1 in the doubles semifinal, Leander Paes and partner Divij Sharan. In February, Rungkat reached his first doubles final ATP Tour 250 at the Sofia Open with partner Hsieh Cheng-peng.

Rungkat won his maiden ATP Tour title at the 2020 Maharashtra Open in Pune, India in the men's doubles event, after 13 years on tour. Partnered with André Göransson, Rungkat defeated fourth seed and his former partner Hsieh Cheng-peng who competed with Denys Molchanov 3–6, 6–4, [10–8] in the first round to advance to the quarterfinal. They then surprised the French team of Benoît Paire and Antoine Hoang in straight sets, before securing a spot in the final with a win over Romain Arneodo and Andre Begemann 6–4, 7–6^{(7–1)}. In the final, the pairing defeated third seeds Jonathan Erlich and Andrei Vasilevski in the super tie-break.

== Awards and nominations ==
| Award | Year | Category | Result | Ref. |
|---|---|---|---|---|
| AORI | 2009 | Best Hope Athlete | Placed | |
| AORI | 2011 | Best Male Athlete | Nominated | |
| AORI | 2011 | Favorite Athlete | Nominated | |
| Indonesian Sport Awards | 2018 | Favorite Mixed Doubles Athlete with Aldila Sutjiadi | Nominated | |
| International Tennis Federation | 2020 | Davis Cup Commitment Award | Placed | |

== ATP career finals ==
=== Doubles: 2 (1 title, 1 runner-up) ===
| Legend Grand Slam tournaments ATP Tour Finals ATP Tour Masters 1000 ATP Tour 500 Series ATP Tour 250 Series (1–1) | Finals by surface Hard (1–1) Clay (0–0) | Finals by setting Outdoor (1–0) Indoor (0–1) |

| Result | W–L | Date | Tournament | Tier | Surface | Partner | Opponents | Score |
|---|---|---|---|---|---|---|---|---|
| Loss | 0–1 | Feb 2019 | Sofia Open, Bulgaria | 250 Series | Hard | (Chinese Taipei) Hsieh Cheng-peng | (Croatia) Nikola Mektić (Austria) Jürgen Melzer | 2–6, 6–4, [2–10] |
| Win | 1–1 | Feb 2020 | Maharashtra Open, India | 250 Series | Hard | (Sweden) André Göransson | (Israel) Jonathan Erlich (Belarus) Andrei Vasilevski | 6–2, 3–6, [10–8] |

== ATP Challengers and ITF Futures finals ==
=== Singles: 17 (11 titles, 6 runner-ups) ===
| Legend (singles) ATP Challenger Tour (0–0) ITF Futures Tour (11–6) | Finals by surface Hard (11–6) Clay (0–0) |

| Result | W–L | Date | Tournament | Tier | Surface | Opponent | Score |
|---|---|---|---|---|---|---|---|
| Win | 1–0 | Jun 2010 | Indonesia F2, Tarakan | Futures | Hard (i) | (South Korea) An Jae-sung | 6–3, 0–6, 6–2 |
| Win | 2–0 | May 2011 | Indonesia F1, Jakarta | Futures | Hard | (Germany) Richard Becker | 6–4, 6–3 |
| Win | 3–0 | Jun 2011 | Indonesia F2, Surabaya | Futures | Hard | (Japan) Arata Onozawa | 7–6^{(7–5)}, 7–6^{(7–5)} |
| Win | 4–0 | Jun 2011 | Indonesia F3, Jakarta | Futures | Hard | (Japan) Kento Takeuchi | 6–3, 6–2 |
| Loss | 4–1 | May 2012 | Thailand F2, Bangkok | Futures | Hard | (New Zealand) José Statham | 6–7^{(10–12)}, 3–6 |
| Win | 5–1 | May 2012 | Thailand F3, Bangkok | Futures | Hard | (France) Antoine Escoffier | 6–2, 6–2 |
| Win | 6–1 | Jul 2012 | Indonesia F1, Jakarta | Futures | Hard | (South Korea) Nam Ji-sung | 7–6^{(7–5)}, 6–1 |
| Win | 7–1 | Dec 2012 | Indonesia F3, Jakarta | Futures | Hard | (South Korea) Jeong Suk-young | 6–4, 7–5 |
| Loss | 7–2 | Jun 2014 | Thailand F5, Bangkok | Futures | Hard | (Japan) Toshihide Matsui | 4–6, 1–6 |
| Loss | 7–3 | Jun 2014 | Thailand F7, Bangkok | Futures | Hard | (Australia) Dayne Kelly | 6–7^{(4–7)}, 6–7^{(7–9)} |
| Win | 8–3 | Apr 2015 | Indonesia F1, Tarakan | Futures | Hard (i) | (New Zealand) Finn Tearney | 7–6^{(9–7)}, 1–6, 6–1 |
| Loss | 8–4 | Apr 2015 | Indonesia F3, Jakarta | Futures | Hard | (South Korea) Lee Duck-hee | 4–6, 3–6 |
| Win | 9–4 | Jun 2015 | Thailand F5, Bangkok | Futures | Hard | (Japan) Shuichi Sekiguchi | 6–4, 6–3 |
| Loss | 9–5 | Aug 2016 | Vietnam F2, Thủ Dầu Một | Futures | Hard | (Japan) Yusuke Takahashi | 4–6, 1–6 |
| Win | 10–5 | Aug 2016 | Indonesia F1, Jakarta | Futures | Hard | (Hong Kong) Wong Hong-kit | 6–0, 6–1 |
| Win | 11–5 | Aug 2016 | Indonesia F2, Makassar | Futures | Hard | (Mexico) Lucas Gómez | 6–3, 3–6, 6–0 |
| Loss | 11–6 | Mar 2017 | Indonesia F4, Jakarta | Futures | Hard | (United Kingdom) Brydan Klein | 6–4, 2–6, 6–7^{(5–7)} |

=== Doubles: 95 (60 titles, 35 runner-ups) ===
| Legend ATP Challenger Tour (10–21) ITF Futures Tour/World Tennis Tour (50–14) | Finals by surface Hard (53–30) Clay (6–3) Grass (1–0) Carpet (0–2) |

| Result | W–L | Date | Tournament | Tier | Surface | Partner | Opponents | Score |
|---|---|---|---|---|---|---|---|---|
| Loss | 0–1 | Aug 2005 | Indonesia F1, Yogyakarta | Futures | Hard | (Indonesia) Febi Widhiyanto | (Indonesia) Suwandi (Indonesia) Bonit Wiryawan | 4–6, 2–6 |
| Loss | 0–2 | Aug 2007 | Indonesia F3, Jakarta | Futures | Hard | (Indonesia) Bonit Wiryawan | (Chinese Taipei) Chang Huai-en (Chinese Taipei) Peng Hsien-yin | 5–7, 3–6 |
| Win | 1–2 | Sep 2007 | Indonesia F5, Jakarta | Futures | Hard | (Indonesia) Andrian Raturandang | (India) Aditya Madkekar (India) Ashutosh Singh | 6–3, 2–6, [10–5] |
| Win | 2–2 | Feb 2008 | Thailand F2, Laksi | Futures | Hard | (United States) Nathan Thompson | (Czech Republic) Roman Jebavý (Czech Republic) Filip Zeman | 6–4, 6–2 |
| Win | 3–2 | Feb 2008 | Thailand F3, Nonthaburi | Futures | Hard | (United States) Nathan Thompson | (China) Gong Maoxin (Japan) Norikazu Sugiyama | 6–2, 6–4 |
| Win | 4–2 | Jul 2008 | Indonesia F1, Jakarta | Futures | Hard | (Indonesia) Ayrton Wibowo | (Chinese Taipei) Peng Hsien-yin (Chinese Taipei) Yi Chu-huan | 6–1, 7–5 |
| Win | 5–2 | Nov 2008 | Malaysia F1, Kuala Lumpur | Futures | Hard | (United States) Nathan Thompson | (Belarus) Sergey Betov (Belarus) Andrei Karatchenia | 6–3, 6–4 |
| Win | 6–2 | Aug 2009 | Iran F5, Tehran | Futures | Clay | (Indonesia) Sunu Wahyu Trijati | (Russia) Alexei Filenkov (Uzbekistan) Murad Inoyatov | 6–2, 6–0 |
| Win | 7–2 | Aug 2009 | Thailand F2, Nonthaburi | Futures | Hard | (Indonesia) Nesa Arta | (Japan) Tasuku Iwami (Japan) Hiroki Moriya | 4–6, 6–4, [12–10] |
| Loss | 7–3 | Aug 2009 | Thailand F3, Nonthaburi | Futures | Hard | (Indonesia) Nesa Arta | (Chinese Taipei) Lee Hsin-han (Chinese Taipei) Yang Tsung-hua | 6–7^{(4–7)}, 4–6 |
| Win | 8–3 | Jun 2010 | Indonesia F3, Tegal | Futures | Hard | (United States) Nathan Thompson | (Thailand) Weerapat Doakmaiklee (Thailand) Kittipong Wachiramanowong | 4–6, 6–4, [12–10] |
| Loss | 8–4 | Jun 2010 | Malaysia F2, Kuala Lumpur | Futures | Hard | (United States) Nathan Thompson | (Australia) Kaden Hensel (Australia) Dane Propoggia | 1–6, 6–7^{(1–7)} |
| Win | 9–4 | Nov 2010 | Thailand F4, Khon Kaen | Futures | Hard | (Thailand) Kirati Siributwong | (France) Dorian Descloix (France) Yannick Jankovits | 6–2, 7–6^{(8–6)} |
| Loss | 9–5 | Apr 2011 | Thailand F3, Khon Kaen | Futures | Hard | (Thailand) Kirati Siributwong | (Thailand) Weerapat Doakmaiklee (Thailand) Kittipong Wachiramanowong | 0–6, 2–6 |
| Win | 10–5 | Apr 2011 | India F4, Noida | Futures | Hard | (Thailand) Kittipong Wachiramanowong | (Japan) Junn Mitsuhashi (Thailand) Danai Udomchoke | 6–7^{(1–7)}, 6–3, [10–6] |
| Win | 11–5 | Jun 2011 | Indonesia F2, Surabaya | Futures | Hard | (Thailand) Weerapat Doakmaiklee | (Chinese Taipei) Huang Liang-chi (China) Ouyang Bowen | 6–4, 7–5 |
| Win | 12–5 | Jun 2011 | Indonesia F3, Jakarta | Futures | Hard | (Thailand) Weerapat Doakmaiklee | (Indonesia) David Agung Susanto (Indonesia) Sunu Wahyu Trijati | 7–5, 6–0 |
| Win | 13–5 | Jun 2011 | Japan F6, Kashiwa | Futures | Hard | (Chinese Taipei) Yi Chu-huan | (Chinese Taipei) Hsieh Cheng-peng (Chinese Taipei) Lee Hsin-han | 7–6^{(7–2)}, 6–3 |
| Win | 14–5 | Jun 2011 | Japan F7, Tokyo-Akishima | Futures | Grass | (Chinese Taipei) Yi Chu-huan | (Chinese Taipei) Hsieh Cheng-peng (Chinese Taipei) Lee Hsin-han | 6–4, 6–3 |
| Loss | 14–6 | May 2012 | Thailand F3, Bangkok | Futures | Hard | (Indonesia) David Agung Susanto | (Chinese Taipei) Lee Hsin-han (Chinese Taipei) Peng Hsien-yin | 6–7^{(3–7)}, 3–6 |
| Win | 15–6 | Jun 2012 | Indonesia F1, Jakarta | Futures | Hard | (Indonesia) Elbert Sie | (South Korea) Kim Cheong-eui (South Korea) Oh Dae-soung | 4–6, 7–5, [10–3] |
| Win | 16–6 | Jun 2013 | Netherlands F1, Amstelveen | Futures | Clay | (Finland) Henri Kontinen | (Netherlands) Niels Lootsma (Netherlands) Jelle Sels | 6–1, 7–5 |
| Win | 17–6 | Jun 2013 | Netherlands F2, Alkmaar | Futures | Clay | (Finland) Henri Kontinen | (Czech Republic) David Škoch (Czech Republic) Jan Zedník | 7–5, 7–6^{(9–7)} |
| Win | 18–6 | Jun 2013 | Netherlands F3, Breda | Futures | Clay | (Finland) Henri Kontinen | (United States) Bjorn Fratangelo (United States) Mitchell Krueger | 6–4, 7–5 |
| Win | 19–6 | Mar 2014 | China F1, Guangzhou | Futures | Hard | (Moldova) Radu Albot | (Italy) Riccardo Ghedin (Italy) Claudio Grassi | 1–6, 7–5, [10–7] |
| Win | 20–6 | May 2014 | Thailand F4, Bangkok | Futures | Hard | (China) Li Zhe | (Thailand) Phassawit Burapharitta (Thailand) Grittaboon Prahmanee | 6–0, 6–1 |
| Loss | 20–7 | Jun 2014 | Thailand F6, Bangkok | Futures | Hard | (United States) Andre Dome | (Thailand) Pruchya Isaro (Thailand) Nuttanon Kadchapanan | 4–6, 7–6^{(7–5)}, [8–10] |
| Win | 21–7 | Jun 2014 | Thailand F7, Bangkok | Futures | Hard | (India) Vishnu Vardhan | (Thailand) Timo Sivapruksa (Thailand) Wishaya Trongcharoenchaikul | 6–1, 6–2 |
| Win | 22–7 | Jul 2014 | Thailand F8, Bangkok | Futures | Hard | (Indonesia) David Agung Susanto | (Thailand) Dane Chuntaruk (Thailand) Pruchya Isaro | 6–3, 6–3 |
| Loss | 22–8 | Apr 2015 | Indonesia F1, Tarakan | Futures | Hard (i) | (Japan) Toshihide Matsui | (United States) Matt Seeberger (New Zealand) Finn Tearney | 2–6, 6–1, [8–10] |
| Win | 23–8 | Apr 2015 | Indonesia F2, Tegal | Futures | Hard | (Japan) Toshihide Matsui | (Indonesia) Aditya Hari Sasongko (Indonesia) Sunu Wahyu Trijati | 6–4, 6–2 |
| Win | 24–8 | Apr 2015 | Indonesia F3, Jakarta | Futures | Hard | (Japan) Toshihide Matsui | (India) Jeevan Nedunchezhiyan (Thailand) Danai Udomchoke | 6–4, 6–2 |
| Win | 25–8 | Apr 2015 | Thailand F1, Bangkok | Futures | Hard | (Japan) Toshihide Matsui | (Thailand) Sanchai Ratiwatana (Thailand) Sonchat Ratiwatana | 4–6, 6–3, [10–8] |
| Win | 26–8 | Jun 2015 | Thailand F4, Bangkok | Futures | Hard | (Japan) Toshihide Matsui | (Thailand) Sanchai Ratiwatana (Thailand) Sonchat Ratiwatana | 4–6, 6–3, [10–2] |
| Win | 27–8 | Aug 2015 | Thailand F6, Bangkok | Futures | Hard | (Japan) Toshihide Matsui | (Australia) Benjamin Mitchell (Australia) Jordan Thompson | 4–6, 6–3, [11–9] |
| Loss | 27–9 | Aug 2015 | Thailand F7, Bangkok | Futures | Hard | (Japan) Toshihide Matsui | (Thailand) Pruchya Isaro (Thailand) Nuttanon Kadchapanan | 4–6, 6–7^{(5–7)} |
| Loss | 0–1 | Jan 2016 | Manila, Philippines | Challenger | Hard | (Philippines) Francis Alcantara | (Sweden) Johan Brunström (Denmark) Frederik Nielsen | 2–6, 2–6 |
| Win | 28–9 | Apr 2016 | China F5, Taizhou | Futures | Hard | (India) Vijay Sundar Prashanth | (Philippines) Jeson Patrombon (China) Wang Aoran | 6–4, 6–0 |
| Win | 29–9 | Jul 2016 | Vietnam F1, Thủ Dầu Một | Futures | Hard | (Indonesia) David Agung Susanto | (Japan) Gengo Kikuchi (Japan) Shunrou Takeshima | 6–3, 6–1 |
| Win | 30–9 | Aug 2016 | Vietnam F2, Thủ Dầu Một | Futures | Hard | (Thailand) Pruchya Isaro | (Japan) Shintaro Imai (Japan) Arata Onozawa | 7–5, 6–2 |
| Win | 31–9 | Aug 2016 | Indonesia F2, Makassar | Futures | Hard | (Indonesia) David Agung Susanto | (Chinese Taipei) Lin Wei-de (Chinese Taipei) Yu Cheng-yu | 6–1, 6–4 |
| Loss | 0–2 | Nov 2016 | Kobe, Japan | Challenger | Hard (i) | (India) Jeevan Nedunchezhiyan | (Germany) Daniel Masur (Croatia) Ante Pavić | 6–4, 3–6, [6–10] |
| Loss | 0–3 | Nov 2016 | Toyota, Japan | Challenger | Carpet (i) | (India) Jeevan Nedunchezhiyan | (Australia) Matt Reid (Australia) John-Patrick Smith | 3–6, 4–6 |
| Win | 32–9 | Dec 2016 | Indonesia F6, Jakarta | Futures | Hard | (Indonesia) Justin Barki | (Poland) Karol Drzewiecki (Poland) Maciej Smoła | 6–4, 6–4 |
| Loss | 0–4 | Jan 2017 | Dallas, United States | Challenger | Hard (i) | (India) Jeevan Nedunchezhiyan | (Republic of Ireland) David O'Hare (United Kingdom) Joe Salisbury | 7–6^{(7–6)}, 3–6, [9–11] |
| Win | 33–9 | Feb 2017 | Indonesia F3, Jakarta | Futures | Hard | (Indonesia) Justin Barki | (Japan) Sho Katayama (Japan) Sho Shimabukuro | 6–3, 6–2 |
| Loss | 0–5 | Mar 2017 | Shenzhen, China | Challenger | Hard | (Chinese Taipei) Hsieh Cheng-peng | (Thailand) Sanchai Ratiwatana (Thailand) Sonchat Ratiwatana | 2–6, 7–6^{(7–5)}, [6–10] |
| Win | 34–9 | Mar 2017 | Indonesia F4, Jakarta | Futures | Hard | (Indonesia) Justin Barki | (Germany) Pirmin Haenle (India) Karunuday Singh | 6–3, 7–6^{(7–1)} |
| Loss | 34–10 | Apr 2017 | Indonesia F6, Jakarta | Futures | Hard | (Indonesia) Justin Barki | (Japan) Soichiro Moritani (Japan) Kento Takeuchi | 4–6, 6–3, [9–11] |
| Win | 35–10 | May 2017 | Japan F6, Karuizawa | Futures | Clay | (Japan) Toshihide Matsui | (Japan) Shintaro Imai (Japan) Takuto Niki | 7–5, 6–2 |
| Win | 1–5 | Jun 2017 | Lisbon, Portugal | Challenger | Clay | (South Africa) Ruan Roelofse | (Portugal) Fred Gil (Portugal) Gonçalo Oliveira | 7–6^{(9–7)}, 6–1 |
| Win | 2–5 | Jul 2017 | Winnetka, United States | Challenger | Hard | (Thailand) Sanchai Ratiwatana | (United States) Bradley Klahn (United States) Kevin King | 7–6^{(7–4)}, 6–2 |
| Loss | 2–6 | Oct 2017 | Ningbo, China | Challenger | Hard | (India) Jeevan Nedunchezhiyan | (Moldova) Radu Albot (New Zealand) José Statham | 5–7, 3–6 |
| Loss | 2–7 | Nov 2017 | Kobe, Japan | Challenger | Hard (i) | (India) Jeevan Nedunchezhiyan | (Japan) Ben McLachlan (Japan) Yasutaka Uchiyama | 6–4, 3–6, [8–10] |
| Loss | 2–8 | Nov 2017 | Toyota, Japan | Challenger | Carpet (i) | (Philippines) Ruben Gonzales | (Australia) Max Purcell (Australia) Andrew Whittington | 3–6, 6–2, [8–10] |
| Win | 36–10 | Nov 2017 | Indonesia F7, Jakarta | Futures | Hard | (Indonesia) Justin Barki | (Japan) Shintaro Imai (Japan) Renta Tokuda | 6–3, 1–6, [11–9] |
| Win | 3–8 | Feb 2018 | Dallas, United States | Challenger | Hard (i) | (India) Jeevan Nedunchezhiyan | (India) Leander Paes (United Kingdom) Joe Salisbury | 6–4, 3–6, [10–7] |
| Loss | 3–9 | Apr 2018 | Nanchang, China | Challenger | Clay (i) | (Philippines) Ruben Gonzales | (China) Gong Mao-xin (China) Zhang Ze | 6–3, 6–7^{(7–9)}, [7–10] |
| Win | 4–9 | May 2018 | Busan, South Korea | Challenger | Hard | (Chinese Taipei) Hsieh Cheng-peng | (South Africa) Ruan Roelofse (Australia) John-Patrick Smith | 6–4, 6–3 |
| Loss | 4–10 | Jul 2018 | Winnetka, United States | Challenger | Hard | (Venezuela) Roberto Maytín | (India) Jeevan Nedunchezhiyan (United States) Austin Krajicek | 7–6^{(7–4)}, 4–6, [5–10] |
| Loss | 36–11 | Jul 2018 | Indonesia F1, Jakarta | Futures | Hard | (Indonesia) Justin Barki | (Australia) Michael Look (Australia) Matthew Romios | 6–7^{(6–8)}, 6–7^{(5–7)} |
| Win | 37–11 | Aug 2018 | Indonesia F3, Jakarta | Futures | Hard | (Indonesia) Justin Barki | (Philippines) Francis Alcantara (Japan) Kaito Uesugi | 6–3, 6–2 |
| Loss | 4–11 | Oct 2018 | Stockton, United States | Challenger | Hard | (Thailand) Sanchai Ratiwatana | (Barbados) Darian King (United States) Noah Rubin | 3–6, 4–6 |
| Win | 5–11 | Oct 2018 | Fairfield, United States | Challenger | Hard | (Thailand) Sanchai Ratiwatana | (Switzerland) Henri Laaksonen (Finland) Harri Heliövaara | 6–0, 7–6 |
| Loss | 5–12 | Oct 2018 | Ningbo, China | Challenger | Hard | (Chinese Taipei) Hsieh Cheng-peng | (China) Gong Maoxin (China) Zhang Ze | 5–7, 6–2, [5–10] |
| Loss | 5–13 | Oct 2018 | Liuzhou, China | Challenger | Hard | (Chinese Taipei) Hsieh Cheng-peng | (China) Gong Maoxin (China) Zhang Ze | 3–6, 6–2, [3–10] |
| Win | 6–13 | Nov 2018 | Shenzhen, China | Challenger | Hard | (Chinese Taipei) Hsieh Cheng-peng | (India) Sriram Balaji (India) Jeevan Nedunchezhiyan | 6–4, 6–2 |
| Win | 7–13 | Jan 2019 | Da Nang, Vietnam | Challenger | Hard | (Chinese Taipei) Hsieh Cheng-peng | (Mexico) Miguel Ángel Reyes-Varela (India) Leander Paes | 6–3, 2–6, [11–9] |
| Loss | 7–14 | Feb 2019 | Bangkok, Thailand | Challenger | Hard | (Chinese Taipei) Hsieh Cheng-peng | (China) Gong Maoxin (China) Zhang Ze | 4–6, 4–6 |
| Win | 8–14 | Mar 2019 | Shenzhen, China | Challenger | Hard | (Chinese Taipei) Hsieh Cheng-peng | (Portugal) Gonçalo Oliveira (China) Li Zhe | 6–4, 3–6, [10–6] |
| Win | 9–14 | May 2019 | Busan, South Korea | Challenger | Hard | (Chinese Taipei) Hsieh Cheng-peng | (Japan) Toshihide Matsui (India) Vishnu Vardhan | 7–6^{(9–7)}, 6–1 |
| Win | 10–14 | May 2019 | Gwangju, South Korea | Challenger | Hard | (Chinese Taipei) Hsieh Cheng-peng | (South Korea) Nam Ji-sung (South Korea) Song Min-kyu | 6–3, 3–6, [10–6] |
| Loss | 10–15 | Nov 2019 | Kobe, Japan | Challenger | Hard (i) | (Sweden) André Göransson | (India) Purav Raja (India) Ramkumar Ramanathan | 6–7^{(6–8)}, 3–6 |
| Loss | 10–16 | Jan 2020 | Bangkok, Thailand | Challenger | Hard | (Thailand) Sanchai Ratiwatana | (Kazakhstan) Andrey Golubev (Kazakhstan) Aleksandr Nedovyesov | 6–3, 6–7^{(1–7)}, [5–10] |
| Loss | 37–12 | Aug 2022 | M15 Jakarta, Indonesia | World Tennis Tour | Hard | (Indonesia) Nathan Anthony Barki | (Japan) Yuta Shimizu (Japan) Ryota Tanuma | 1–6, 6–7^{(6–8)} |
| Loss | 10–17 | Aug 2022 | Nonthaburi, Thailand | Challenger | Hard | (Philippines) Francis Alcantara | (Zimbabwe) Benjamin Lock (Japan) Yuta Shimizu | 1–6, 3–6 |
| Loss | 10–18 | Sep 2022 | Nonthaburi, Thailand | Challenger | Hard | (Philippines) Francis Alcantara | (New Zealand) Ajeet Rai (South Korea) Chung Yun-seong | 1–6, 6–7 |
| Loss | 10–19 | Sep 2022 | Braga, Portugal | Challenger | Clay | (India) Jeevan Nedunchezhiyan | (Czech Republic) Vít Kopřiva (Czech Republic) Jaroslav Pospíšil | 6–3, 3–6, [4–10] |
| Loss | 10–20 | Jan 2023 | Nonthaburi, Thailand | Challenger | Hard | (Australia) Akira Santillan | (India) Yuki Bhambri (India) Saketh Myneni | 6–2, 6–7^{(7–9)}, [12–14] |
| Win | 38–12 | Jan 2023 | M15 Jakarta, Indonesia | World Tennis Tour | Hard | (Indonesia) Nathan Anthony Barki | (Chinese Taipei) Huang Tsung-hao (South Korea) Lee Duck-hee | 6–2, 6–4 |
| Loss | 38–13 | Jun 2023 | M25 Jakarta, Indonesia | World Tennis Tour | Hard | (Indonesia) Nathan Anthony Barki | (Japan) Hiroki Moriya (Philippines) Francis Alcantara | 1–6, 2–6 |
| Win | 39–13 | Jun 2023 | M25 Jakarta, Indonesia | World Tennis Tour | Hard | (Indonesia) Nathan Anthony Barki | (Indonesia) Anthony Susanto (Indonesia) David Agung Susanto | 6–4, 6–4 |
| Win | 40–13 | Aug 2023 | M25 Jakarta, Indonesia | World Tennis Tour | Hard | (Indonesia) Nathan Anthony Barki | (South Korea) Han Seon-yong (South Korea) Lee Jea-moon | 6–2, 4–6, [10–1] |
| Win | 41–13 | Nov 2023 | M15 Ipoh, Malaysia | World Tennis Tour | Hard | (Philippines) Francis Alcantara | (Netherlands) Thijmen Loof (Thailand) Wishaya Trongcharoenchaikul | 6–2, 6–0 |
| Win | 42–13 | Nov 2023 | M15 Kuala Lumpur, Malaysia | World Tennis Tour | Hard | (Philippines) Francis Alcantara | (Netherlands) Thijmen Loof (Thailand) Pruchya Isaro | 6–4, 6–2 |
| Win | 43–13 | Jan 2024 | M25 Chennai, India | World Tennis Tour | Hard | (Philippines) Francis Alcantara | Bogdan Bobrov (India) Adil Kalyanpur | 6–4, 6–2 |
| Win | 44–13 | Feb 2024 | M15 Nakhon Si Thammarat, Thailand | World Tennis Tour | Hard | (Thailand) Pruchya Isaro | (Chinese Taipei) Huang Tsung-hao (South Korea) Yeongseok Jeong | 6–4, 4–6, [10–8] |
| Loss | 10–21 | Mar 2024 | Kigali, Rwanda | Challenger | Clay | (Thailand) Pruchya Isaro | (Netherlands) Max Houkes (France) Clément Tabur | 3–6, 6–7^{(4–7)} |
| Win | 45–13 | Jul 2024 | M25 Taipei, Taiwan | World Tennis Tour | Hard | (Thailand) Pruchya Isaro | (Chinese Taipei) Ray Ho (South Korea) Shin Woo-bin | 7–6^{(7–4)}, 6–4 |
| Win | 46–13 | Aug 2024 | M25 Taipei, Taiwan | World Tennis Tour | Hard | (Thailand) Pruchya Isaro | (India) Sai Karteek Reddy Ganta (Thailand) Wishaya Trongcharoenchaikul | 7–6^{(7–4)}, 7–5 |
| Loss | 46–14 | Jan 2025 | M25 Bali, Indonesia | World Tennis Tour | Hard | (Indonesia) Nathan Anthony Barki | (Japan) Yusuke Kusuhara (Japan) Shunsuke Nakagawa | 2–6, 4–6 |
| Win | 47–14 | Mar 2025 | M15 Nonthaburi, Thailand | World Tennis Tour | Hard | (Indonesia) Muhammad Rifqi Fitriadi | (Thailand) Thanapet Chanta (Thailand) Yuttana Charoenphon | 6–2, 6–4 |
| Win | 48–14 | Sep 2025 | M25 Bali, Indonesia | World Tennis Tour | Hard | (Indonesia) Muhammad Rifqi Fitriadi | (Malaysia) Mitsuki Wei Kang Leong (Japan) Koki Matsuda | 6–0, 2–6, [10–7] |
| Win | 49–14 | Nov 2025 | M15 Kuala Lumpur, Malaysia | World Tennis Tour | Hard | (Indonesia) Muhammad Rifqi Fitriadi | (Philippines) Francis Alcantara (Australia) Chase Ferguson | 4–6, 6–3, [12–10] |
| Win | 50–14 | Nov 2025 | M15 Phan Thiet, Vietnam | World Tennis Tour | Hard | (Indonesia) Muhammad Rifqi Fitriadi | (Thailand) Thanapet Chanta (Thailand) Pawit Sornlaksup | 6–4, 6–3 |

Note: Tournaments sourced from official ITF archives

== Junior Grand Slam finals ==
=== Doubles: 2 (1 title, 1 runner-up) ===
| Result | Year | Tournament | Surface | Partner | Opponents | Score |
|---|---|---|---|---|---|---|
| Win | 2008 | French Open | Clay | (Finland) Henri Kontinen | (Germany) Jaan-Frederik Brunken (Australia) Matt Reid | 6–0, 6–3 |
| Loss | 2008 | US Open | Hard | (Finland) Henri Kontinen | (Austria) Nikolaus Moser (Germany) Cedrik-Marcel Stebe | 6–7^{(5–7)}, 6–3, [8–10] |

== ITF Junior Circuit finals ==
=== Singles: 5 (4 titles, 1 runner-up) ===
| Legend Category GA Category G1 (1–0) Category G2 (0–1) Category G3 (2–0) Category G4 (1–0) Category G5 | Finals by surface Hard (3–0) Clay (1–1) Grass (0–0) Carpet (0–0) |

| Result | W–L | Date | Tournament | Tier | Surface | Opponent | Score |
|---|---|---|---|---|---|---|---|
| Win | 1–0 | Nov 2005 | ITF Solo, Indonesia | G4 | Hard | (Indonesia) Agung-Bagus Dewantoro | 6–3, 6–0 |
| Win | 2–0 | Mar 2006 | ITF Sarawak, Malaysia | G3 | Hard | (Norway) Carl Sundberg | 7–5, 6–4 |
| Win | 3–0 | Jun 2006 | ITF Rabat, Morocco | G3 | Clay | (Georgia (country)) Lazare Kukhalashvili | 6–0, 6–0 |
| Loss | 3–1 | Jun 2006 | ITF Casablanca, Morocco | G2 | Clay | (Lithuania) Ričardas Berankis | 5–7, 5–7 |
| Win | 4–1 | Mar 2008 | ITF Kuching, Malaysia | G1 | Hard | (India) Yuki Bhambri | 6–4, 7–6^{(7–2)} |

=== Doubles: 22 (13 titles, 9 runner-ups) ===
| Legend Category GA (1–1) Category G1 (4–2) Category G2 (4–0) Category G3 (1–2) Category G4 (2–3) Category G5 (1–1) | Finals by surface Hard (5–9) Clay (7–0) Grass (1–0) Carpet (0–0) |

| Result | W–L | Date | Tournament | Tier | Surface | Partner | Opponents | Score |
|---|---|---|---|---|---|---|---|---|
| Loss | 0–1 | Oct 2004 | Hong Kong Open | G4 | Hard | (Indonesia) Muki Tan | (Australia) John-Patrick Smith (Australia) Andrew Thomas | 2–6, 2–6 |
| Loss | 0–2 | Oct 2004 | ITF Yangon, Myanmar | G5 | Hard | (Thailand) Lopburi Nathasiri | (Indonesia) Faisal Aidil (Indonesia) Agung-Bagus Dewantoro | 1–6, 1–6 |
| Win | 1–2 | Nov 2004 | ITF Solo, Indonesia | G4 | Hard | (Indonesia) Jonathan Amdanu | (Indonesia) Muki Tan (Indonesia) Elbert Sie | 6–1, 6–0 |
| Win | 2–2 | Dec 2004 | ITF Singapore | G5 | Hard | (Japan) Shuhei Uzawa | (Thailand) Krittanu Puthong (Malaysia) Muhammad-Ashaari Bin Zainal Abidin | 6–1, 6–0 |
| Loss | 2–3 | Apr 2005 | ITF Seoul, South Korea | G4 | Hard | (Japan) Shuhei Uzawa | (Indonesia) Faisal Aidil (Indonesia) Agung-Bagus Dewantoro | 6–4, 6–7^{(4–7)}, 0–6 |
| Win | 3–3 | Oct 2005 | Thailand Open, Nonthaburi | G2 | Hard | (Japan) Shuhei Uzawa | (New Zealand) Austen Childs (Switzerland) Yann Marti | 7–6^{(7–5)}, 4–6, 7–6^{(8–6)} |
| Win | 4–3 | Nov 2005 | ITF Solo, Indonesia | G4 | Hard | (Indonesia) Aditya Hari Sasongko | (Indonesia) Agung-Bagus Dewantoro (Indonesia) Ayrton Wibowo | 6–2, 5–7, 6–1 |
| Loss | 4–4 | Nov 2005 | ITF Surabaya, Indonesia | G4 | Hard | (Indonesia) Agung-Bagus Dewantoro | (Indonesia) Faisal Aidil (Indonesia) Ayrton Wibowo | 7–6^{(7–3)}, 2–6 ret. |
| Loss | 4–5 | Feb 2006 | ITF Rajshahi, Bangladesh | G3 | Hard | (Philippines) Kyle-Joshua Dandan | (India) Sumit-Prakash Gupta (India) Tejesvi Rao | 6–3, 2–6, 6–7^{(7–9)} |
| Loss | 4–6 | Apr 2006 | ITF Seoul, South Korea | G3 | Hard | (Indonesia) Agung-Bagus Dewantoro | (Indonesia) Faisal Aidil (Indonesia) Ayrton Wibowo | w/o |
| Win | 5–6 | Jun 2006 | ITF Rabat, Morocco | G3 | Clay | (Lithuania) Ričardas Berankis | (Ghana) Emmanuel Mensah (Madagascar) Lofo Ramiaramanana | 6–3, 6–7^{(7–9)}, 6–3 |
| Win | 6–6 | Jun 2006 | ITF Mohammedia, Morocco | G2 | Clay | (Lithuania) Ričardas Berankis | (Ghana) Emmanuel Mensah (Madagascar) Lofo Ramiaramanana | 6–3, 4–6, 6–3 |
| Win | 7–6 | Jun 2006 | ITF Casablanca, Morocco | G2 | Clay | (Lithuania) Ričardas Berankis | (Ghana) Emmanuel Mensah (Madagascar) Lofo Ramiaramanana | 6–4, 7–6^{(10–8)} |
| Win | 8–6 | Mar 2007 | ITF Sarawak, Malaysia | G1 | Hard | (Slovakia) Eugen Brazdil | (Australia) Stephen Donald (Australia) John-Patrick Smith | 7–6^{(7–4)}, 6–3 |
| Win | 9–6 | Jun 2007 | ITF Loverval, Belgium | G1 | Clay | (Lithuania) Ričardas Berankis | (India) Rupesh Roy (Chile) Ricardo Urzua-Rivera | 7–5, 6–2 |
| Win | 10–6 | May 2008 | ITF Villach, Austria | G2 | Clay | (United States) Tennys Sandgren | (United States) Junior Alexander Ore (Australia) Dane Propoggia | 7–6^{(7–4)}, 6–4 |
| Win | 11–6 | May 2008 | ITF Charleroi-Marcinelle, Belgium | G1 | Clay | (Finland) Henri Kontinen | (Chinese Taipei) Hsieh Cheng-peng (Chinese Taipei) Yang Tsung-hua | 6–4, 6–3 |
| Win | 12–6 | Jun 2008 | French Open, Paris | GA | Clay | (Finland) Henri Kontinen | (Germany) Jaan-Frederik Brunken (Australia) Matt Reid | 6–0, 6–3 |
| Win | 13–6 | Jun 2008 | ITF Roehampton, Great Britain | G1 | Grass | (Finland) Henri Kontinen | (Australia) Jared Easton (Australia) Andrew Thomas | 7–5, 6–1 |
| Loss | 13–7 | Aug 2008 | Canadian Open, Quebec | G1 | Hard | (Finland) Henri Kontinen | (Australia) Dane Propoggia (Australia) Matt Reid | 3–6, 6–3, [8–10] |
| Loss | 13–8 | Sep 2008 | US Open, New York | GA | Hard | (Finland) Henri Kontinen | (Austria) Nikolaus Moser (Germany) Cedrik-Marcel Stebe | 6–7^{(5–7)}, 6–3, [8–10] |
| Loss | 13–9 | Sep 2008 | ITF Lexington, United States | G1 | Hard | (Zimbabwe) Takanyi Garanganga | (United States) Matthew Kandath (United States) Ryan Lipman | 1–6, 6–7^{(5–7)} |

Note: Tournaments sourced from official ITF juniors archives

== National representation ==
=== Multi-sport event (Individual) ===
Rungkat made his debut in multi-sport event at the 2007 SEA Games, he won the men's doubles bronze medal.

==== Singles: 3 (3 gold medals) ====
| Result | Date | Tournament | Surface | Opponent | Score |
|---|---|---|---|---|---|
| Gold | Nov 2011 | SEA Games, Palembang | Hard | (Thailand) Danai Udomchoke | 6–2, 6–2 |
| Gold | Sep 2013 | Islamic Solidarity Games, Palembang | Hard | (Algeria) Mohamed Hassen | 6–2, 6–1 |
| Gold | Aug 2017 | SEA Games, Kuala Lumpur | Hard | (Thailand) Jirat Navasirisomboon | 6–4, 6–4 |

==== Doubles: 5 (2 gold medals, 1 silver medal, 2 bronze medals) ====
| Result | Date | Tournament | Surface | Partner | Opponents | Score |
|---|---|---|---|---|---|---|
| Bronze | Dec 2007 | SEA Games, Nakhon Ratchasima | Hard | (Indonesia) Elbert Sie | (Thailand) Sonchat Ratiwatana (Thailand) Sanchai Ratiwatana | 1–6, 3–6 |
| Bronze | Dec 2009 | SEA Games, Vientiane | Hard | (Indonesia) Nesa Arta | (Thailand) Sonchat Ratiwatana (Thailand) Sanchai Ratiwatana | 2–6, 4–6 |
| Gold | Nov 2011 | SEA Games, Palembang | Hard | (Indonesia) Elbert Sie | (Philippines) Treat Huey (Philippines) Cecil Mamiit | 2–6, 6–2, [10–7] |
| Gold | Sep 2013 | Islamic Solidarity Games, Palembang | Hard | (Indonesia) Elbert Sie | (Indonesia) Wisnu Adi Nugroho (Indonesia) David Agung Susanto | 6–4, 4–6, [10–8] |
| Silver | May 2023 | SEA Games, Phnom Penh | Hard | (Indonesia) Nathan Anthony Barki | (Philippines) Francis Alcantara (Philippines) Ruben Gonzales | 6–2, 5–7, [5–10] |

==== Mixed doubles: 6 (4 gold medals, 2 silver medals, 1 bronze medal) ====
| Result | Date | Tournament | Surface | Partner | Opponents | Score |
|---|---|---|---|---|---|---|
| Silver | Nov 2011 | SEA Games, Palembang | Hard | (Indonesia) Jessy Rompies | (Philippines) Treat Huey (Philippines) Denise Dy | 6–4, 3–6, [6–10] |
| Silver | Aug 2017 | SEA Games, Kuala Lumpur | Hard | (Indonesia) Jessy Rompies | (Thailand) Sanchai Ratiwatana (Thailand) Nicha Lertpitaksinchai | 1–6, 2–6 |
| Gold | Aug 2018 | Asian Games, Palembang | Hard | (Indonesia) Aldila Sutjiadi | (Thailand) Sonchat Ratiwatana (Thailand) Luksika Kumkhum | 4–6, 7–5, [10–7] |
| Gold | Dec 2019 | SEA Games, Manila | Hard | (Indonesia) Aldila Sutjiadi | (Thailand) Sanchai Ratiwatana (Thailand) Tamarine Tanasugarn | 4–6, 6–4, [10–8] |
| Gold | May 2022 | SEA Games, Bắc Ninh | Hard | (Indonesia) Aldila Sutjiadi | (Thailand) Pruchya Isaro (Thailand) Patcharin Cheapchandej | 6–7^{(7–9)}, 6–2, [10–5] |
| Gold | May 2023 | SEA Games, Phnom Penh | Hard | (Indonesia) Aldila Sutjiadi | (Thailand) Pruchya Isaro (Thailand) Peangtarn Plipuech | 2–6, 6–4, [10–5] |
| Bronze | Dec 2025 | SEA Games, Nonthaburi | Hard | (Indonesia) Aldila Sutjiadi | (Thailand) Pruchya Isaro (Thailand) Peangtarn Plipuech | 6–4, 3–6, [5–10] |

== Grand Slam performance timeline ==
Key
| W | F | SF | QF | #R | RR | Q# | P# | DNQ | A | Z# | PO | G | S | B | NMS | NTI | P | NH |

(W) winner; (F) finalist; (SF) semifinalist; (QF) quarterfinalist; (#R) rounds 4, 3, 2, 1; (RR) round-robin stage; (Q#) qualification round; (P#) preliminary round; (DNQ) did not qualify; (A) absent; (Z#) Davis/Fed Cup Zonal Group (with number indication) or (PO) play-off; (G) gold, (S) silver or (B) bronze Olympic/Paralympic medal; (NMS) not a Masters tournament; (NTI) not a Tier I tournament; (P) postponed; (NH) not held; (SR) strike rate (events won / competed); (W–L) win–loss record.
To avoid confusion and double counting, these charts are updated at the conclusion of a tournament or when the player's participation has ended.

Singles

| Tournament | 2013 | W–L |
|---|---|---|
| Australian Open | Q1 | 0–1 |
| Win–loss | 0–1 | 0–1 |

Doubles

| Tournament | 2019 | 2022 | W–L |
|---|---|---|---|
| Australian Open | A | 2R | 1–1 |
| French Open | 2R | A | 1–1 |
| Wimbledon | 1R | A | 0–1 |
| US Open | 1R | A | 0–1 |
| Win–loss | 1–3 | 1–1 | 2–4 |

Mixed doubles

| Tournament | 2019 | W–L |
|---|---|---|
| Wimbledon | 2R | 1–1 |
| Win–loss | 1–1 | 1–1 |

== See also ==
- List of Indonesia Davis Cup team representatives
