= Karate at the 2013 Islamic Solidarity Games =

- Venue: Sriwijaya Promotion Center
- Location: Indonesia Palembang
- Dates: 23–25 September

Karate at the 2013 Islamic Solidarity Games was held at Sriwijaya Promotion Center, Palembang, Indonesia from 23 to 25 September 2013

== Medal summary ==
=== Men ===
| Event | Gold | Silver | Bronze |
|---|---|---|---|
| Individual kata | Lim Chee Wei; Malaysia | Djaâfer Islam Mehdi; Algeria | Mehmet Yakan; Turkey |
| Individual kata | Lim Chee Wei; Malaysia | Djaâfer Islam Mehdi; Algeria | Ibrahim Magdy; Egypt |
| Team kata | Indonesia; Aswar; Fidelys Lolobua; Faisal Zainuddin | Kuwait; Salman Al-Mosawi; Mohammad Al-Mosawi; Mohammad Al-Qattan | Egypt; Ibrahim Magdy; Mustafa Ibrahim; Ahmed Ashraf |
| Team kata | Indonesia; Aswar; Fidelys Lolobua; Faisal Zainuddin | Kuwait; Salman Al-Mosawi; Mohammad Al-Mosawi; Mohammad Al-Qattan | Iran; Ahad Shahin; Armin Roshani; Farzad Mohammadkhanloo |
| Kumite −55 kg | Ahmed Said Helmy; Egypt | Mohammed Taoussi; Morocco | Abdullah Shaaban; Kuwait |
| Kumite −55 kg | Ahmed Said Helmy; Egypt | Mohammed Taoussi; Morocco | Imam Tauhid Ragananda; Indonesia |
| Kumite −60 kg | Abdelkrim Bouamria; Algeria | Hamoun Derafshipour; Iran | Mesfer Al-Ajmi; Kuwait |
| Kumite −60 kg | Abdelkrim Bouamria; Algeria | Hamoun Derafshipour; Iran | El-Mehdi Benrouida; Morocco |
| Kumite −67 kg | Fahad Al-Khathami; Saudi Arabia | Niyazi Aliyev; Azerbaijan | Redouan Kousseksou; Morocco |
| Kumite −67 kg | Fahad Al-Khathami; Saudi Arabia | Niyazi Aliyev; Azerbaijan | İdris Demir; Turkey |
| Kumite −75 kg | Rafael Aghayev; Azerbaijan | Saeid Hassanipour; Iran | Bader Al-Otaibi; Saudi Arabia |
| Kumite −75 kg | Rafael Aghayev; Azerbaijan | Saeid Hassanipour; Iran | Necati Pınarbaşı; Turkey |
| Kumite −84 kg | Aykhan Mamayev; Azerbaijan | Hany Shakr; Egypt | Nawaf Al-Nazhan; Saudi Arabia |
| Kumite −84 kg | Aykhan Mamayev; Azerbaijan | Hany Shakr; Egypt | Yavuz Karamollaoğlu; Turkey |
| Kumite +84 kg | Zabihollah Pourshab; Iran | Shahin Atamov; Azerbaijan | Missipsa Hamadini; Algeria |
| Kumite +84 kg | Zabihollah Pourshab; Iran | Shahin Atamov; Azerbaijan | Sulaiman Al-Mulla; United Arab Emirates |
| Team kumite | Azerbaijan | Iran | Indonesia |
| Team kumite | Azerbaijan | Iran | Egypt |

=== Women ===
| Event | Gold | Silver | Bronze |
|---|---|---|---|
| Individual kata | Mahsa Afsaneh; Iran | Bigem Giroğlu; Turkey | Celine Lee; Malaysia |
| Individual kata | Mahsa Afsaneh; Iran | Bigem Giroğlu; Turkey | Yulianti Syafrudin; Indonesia |
| Team kata | Egypt; Mai Gamaleldin; Randa Atef; Shaimaa Mohamed | Algeria; Yasmine Mouloud; Selma Bedja; Kamelia Hadj Saïd | Turkey; Kübra Dişçi; Çağla Barış; Bigem Giroğlu |
| Team kata | Egypt; Mai Gamaleldin; Randa Atef; Shaimaa Mohamed | Algeria; Yasmine Mouloud; Selma Bedja; Kamelia Hadj Saïd | Indonesia; Ayu Rahmawati; Siti Maryam; Eva Fitriani Setiawati |
| Kumite −50 kg | Areeg Said; Egypt | Neslihan Çalışkan; Turkey | Nasrin Dousti; Iran |
| Kumite −50 kg | Areeg Said; Egypt | Neslihan Çalışkan; Turkey | Srunita Sari Sukatendel; Indonesia |
| Kumite −55 kg | Yassmin Hamdy; Egypt | Nisha Alagasan; Malaysia | Nova Sinaga; Indonesia |
| Kumite −55 kg | Yassmin Hamdy; Egypt | Nisha Alagasan; Malaysia | Büşra Tosun; Turkey |
| Kumite −61 kg | Giana Farouk; Egypt | Delaram Dousti; Iran | Cok Istri Agung Sanistyarani; Indonesia |
| Kumite −61 kg | Giana Farouk; Egypt | Delaram Dousti; Iran | Ece Yaşar; Turkey |
| Kumite −68 kg | Merve Çoban; Turkey | Pegah Zangeneh; Iran | Zahira Abdelkader; Algeria |
| Kumite −68 kg | Merve Çoban; Turkey | Pegah Zangeneh; Iran | Nadia Benkhadda; Morocco |
| Kumite +68 kg | Hamideh Abbasali; Iran | Aya Nabil; Egypt | Sofia Raghai; Morocco |
| Kumite +68 kg | Hamideh Abbasali; Iran | Aya Nabil; Egypt | Hilal Gök; Turkey |
| Team kumite | Egypt | Iran | Turkey |
| Team kumite | Egypt | Iran | Indonesia |

== Medal table ==
| Rank | Nation | Gold | Silver | Bronze | Total |
|---|---|---|---|---|---|
| 1 | Egypt (EGY) | 6 | 2 | 3 | 11 |
| 2 | Iran (IRI) | 3 | 6 | 2 | 11 |
| 3 | Azerbaijan (AZE) | 3 | 2 | 0 | 5 |
| 4 | Turkey (TUR) | 1 | 2 | 9 | 12 |
| 5 | Algeria (ALG) | 1 | 2 | 2 | 5 |
| 6 | Malaysia (MAS) | 1 | 1 | 1 | 3 |
| 7 | Indonesia (INA) | 1 | 0 | 8 | 9 |
| 8 | Saudi Arabia (KSA) | 1 | 0 | 2 | 3 |
| 9 | Morocco (MAR) | 0 | 1 | 4 | 5 |
| 10 | Kuwait (KUW) | 0 | 1 | 2 | 3 |
| 11 | United Arab Emirates (UAE) | 0 | 0 | 1 | 1 |
| Totals (11 entries) | | 17 | 17 | 34 | 68 |
