= Satriyo Rahadhani =

Indonesian taekwondo practitioner

Personal information
- Full name: Satriyo Rahadhani
- Nationality: Indonesia
- Born: 17 September 1981 (age 45) Surabaya, Indonesia
- Height: 1.68 m (5 ft 6 in)
- Weight: 58 kg (128 lb)

Sport
- Sport: Taekwondo
- Event: 58 kg
Medal record
Men's taekwondo
Representing Indonesia
Asian Games
Silver medal – second place	1998 Bangkok	58 kg
Asian Championships
Bronze medal – third place	2000 Hong Kong	58 kg
Bronze medal – third place	2002 Amman	58 kg
Islamic Solidarity Games
Bronze medal – third place	2005 Mecca	58 kg

Satriyo Rahadhani (born September 17, 1981) is an Indonesian taekwondo practitioner, who competed in the men's flyweight category. He claimed a silver medal in the 58-kg division, as a 17-year-old teen, at the 1998 Asian Games in Bangkok, Thailand, and became the first Indonesian male taekwondo fighter to mark an Olympic debut in the sport at the 2004 Summer Olympics.

Rahadhani qualified for the Indonesian squad in the men's flyweight class (58 kg) at the 2004 Summer Olympics in Athens, by granting a berth and placing fifth from the Asian Olympic Qualifying Tournament in Bangkok, Thailand. Rahadhani crashed out in a tight 5–6 defeat to British taekwondo fighter and 2003 World silver medalist Paul Green in the opening round. With Green losing the quarterfinals to Vietnam's Nguyen Quoc Huan, Rahadhani denied his chance to compete for an Olympic bronze medal in the repechage.
