= Nor Rizah Ishak =

Malaysian archer

Personal information
- National team: 2015
- Born: 21 April 1969 (age 57)

Sport
- Country: Malaysia
- Sport: Archery
- Event: Compound
Medal record
Women's compound archery
Representing Malaysia
Asian Championships
Silver medal – second place	2011 Tehran	Team
Bronze medal – third place	2015 Bangkok	Team

Nor Rizah Ishak (born 21 April 1969) is a Malaysian female compound archer and part of the national team. She won the bronze medal at the 2015 Asian Archery Championships in the women's team event.
