= Weightlifting at the 2013 Islamic Solidarity Games =

The Weightlifting events at the 2013 Islamic Solidarity Games were held at the Swarna Dwipa Hotel in Palembang from 24 to 27 September 2013.

== Medalists ==
=== Men ===
Event	Gold	Silver	Bronze
56 kg	Ali Ahmed; Iraq	Mansour Al-Saleem; Saudi Arabia	Muhammad Purkon; Indonesia
62 kg	Eko Yuli Irawan; Indonesia	Ahmed Saad; Egypt	Zulfugar Suleymanov; Azerbaijan
69 kg	Deni; Indonesia	Karrar Mohammed; Iraq	Mohamed Abdelbaki; Egypt
77 kg	Ibrahim Ramadan; Egypt	Afgan Bayramov; Azerbaijan	Mussab Omar Muftah; Libya
85 kg	Tarek Yehia; Egypt	Nezir Sağır; Turkey	Namig Jamilov; Azerbaijan
94 kg	Ragab Abdelhay; Egypt	Intigam Zairov; Azerbaijan	Jasurbek Jumaýew; Turkmenistan
105 kg	Ahed Joughili; Syria	Ahmed Sellou; Egypt	Salwan Jasim; Iraq
+105 kg	Mohamed Ihsan; Egypt	Ahmed Mohamed; Egypt	Hojamuhammet Toýçyýew; Turkmenistan

=== Women ===
Event	Gold	Silver	Bronze
48 kg	Sri Wahyuni Agustiani; Indonesia	Silviya Angelova; Azerbaijan	Heba Saleh; Egypt
53 kg	Citra Febrianti; Indonesia	Syarah Anggraini; Indonesia	Azizah Fadzil; Malaysia
58 kg	Okta Dwi Pramita; Indonesia	Donia Mohamed; Egypt	Frenceay Titus; Malaysia
63 kg	Sinta Darmariani; Indonesia	Samar Said; Egypt	Dwi Atika Sari; Indonesia
69 kg	Ghada Hassine; Tunisia	Siti Sarah; Indonesia	Boshra Mohammad; Syria
75 kg	Thuraia Sobh; Syria	Nur Khasida Abdul Halim; Malaysia	Siti Aishah Mohd Rosli; Malaysia
+75 kg	Halima Abdelazim; Egypt	Manar Said; Egypt	Nur Jannah Batrisyah; Malaysia

== Medal table ==
Rank	Nation	Gold	Silver	Bronze	Total
1	Indonesia (INA)	6	2	2	10
2	Egypt (EGY)	5	6	2	13
3	Syria (SYR)	2	0	1	3
4	Iraq (IRQ)	1	1	1	3
5	Tunisia (TUN)	1	0	0	1
6	Azerbaijan (AZE)	0	3	2	5
7	Malaysia (MAS)	0	1	4	5
8	Saudi Arabia (KSA)	0	1	0	1
8	Turkey (TUR)	0	1	0	1
10	Turkmenistan (TKM)	0	0	2	2
11	Libya (LBA)	0	0	1	1
Totals (11 entries)		15	15	15	45
