= Diving at the 2017 Islamic Solidarity Games =

- Venue: Aquatic Palace
- Dates: 18–21 May 2017

Diving at the 2017 Islamic Solidarity Games was held in Aquatic Palace, Baku, Azerbaijan from 18 to 21 May 2017.

== Medal table ==
Rank	Nation	Gold	Silver	Bronze	Total
1	Iran (IRI)	3	0	1	4
2	Azerbaijan (AZE)	2	2	2	6
3	Turkey (TUR)	1	1	1	3
4	Indonesia (INA)	0	3	1	4
5	Iraq (IRQ)	0	0	1	1
Totals (5 entries)		6	6	6	18

== Medalists ==
=== Men ===
Event	Gold	Silver	Bronze
3 m springboard	Mojtaba Valipour; Iran	Aldinsyah Putra Rafi; Indonesia	Dmitriy Sorokin; Azerbaijan
10 m platform	Kıvanç Gür; Turkey	Artem Danilov; Azerbaijan	Shahnam Nazarpour; Iran
Synchronized 3 m springboard	Iran; Shahnam Nazarpour; Mojtaba Valipour	Indonesia; Tri Anggoro Priambodo; Aldinsyah Putra Rafi	Azerbaijan; Artem Danilov; Dmitriy Sorokin
Synchronized 10 m platform	Iran; Shahnam Nazarpour; Mojtaba Valipour	Azerbaijan; Artem Danilov; Dmitriy Sorokin	Iraq; Hussein Abdul-Jabbar; Hussein Hakeem

=== Women ===
Event	Gold	Silver	Bronze
3 m springboard	Olga Bykovskaya; Azerbaijan	Yaprak Selin Keskin; Turkey	Della Dinarsari Harimurti; Indonesia
10 m platform	Olga Bykovskaya; Azerbaijan	Della Dinarsari Harimurti; Indonesia	Sinem Sağlam; Turkey
