= Badminton at the 2013 Islamic Solidarity Games =

Badminton at the 2013 Islamic Solidarity Games was held in GOR Dempo Jaka Baring, Palembang, Indonesia from 23 September to 30 September 2013.

== Medalists ==
Event	Gold	Silver	Bronze
Men's singles	Nur Mohd Azriyn Ayub; Malaysia	Goh Giap Chin; Malaysia	Emre Vural; Turkey
Men's singles	Nur Mohd Azriyn Ayub; Malaysia	Goh Giap Chin; Malaysia	Rizky Antasari; Indonesia
Men's doubles	Malaysia; Low Juan Shen; Tan Yip Jiun	Turkey; Emre Aslan; Hüseyin Oruç	Turkey; Emre Lale; Emre Vural
Men's doubles	Malaysia; Low Juan Shen; Tan Yip Jiun	Turkey; Emre Aslan; Hüseyin Oruç	Indonesia; Danang Haryandika; Ivan Gunardi
Men's team	Malaysia; Mohd Lutfi Zaim Abdul Khalid; Nur Mohd Azriyn Ayub; Chong Yee Han; Goh Giap Chin; Nelson Heg; Low Juan Shen; Tan Kian Meng; Tan Yip Jiun; Wong Fai Yin; Yew Hong Kheng	Indonesia; Rizky Antasari; Rohmat Abdul Rohman; Abu Bakar; Felix Eka; Ivan Gunardi; Danang Haryandika; Christeven Howard; Alwi Mahardika; Tedi Supriadi; I Putu Roy Danu Wira	Turkey; Emre Aslan; Emre Lale; Hüseyin Oruç; Ramazan Öztürk; Emre Vural
Women's singles	Neslihan Yiğit; Turkey	Lim Yin Fun; Malaysia	Intan Dwi Jayanti; Indonesia
Women's singles	Neslihan Yiğit; Turkey	Lim Yin Fun; Malaysia	Fitriani; Indonesia
Women's doubles	Malaysia; Chow Mei Kuan; Shevon Jemie Lai	Indonesia; Dini Fitri; Inten Ratnasari	Malaysia; Amelia Alicia Anscelly; Soong Fie Cho
Women's doubles	Malaysia; Chow Mei Kuan; Shevon Jemie Lai	Indonesia; Dini Fitri; Inten Ratnasari	Indonesia; Nisak Puji Lestari; Ravenska Cintya Adifta
Women's team	Malaysia; Amelia Alicia Anscelly; Chow Mei Kuan; Shevon Jemie Lai; Lee Zhi Yii; Lim Chiew Sien; Lim Yin Fun; Soong Fie Cho	Indonesia; Ravenska Cintya Adifta; Chintia Rhizta Andreti; Dini Fitri; Fitriani; Intan Dwi Jayanti; Nisak Puji Lestari; Inten Ratnasari; Rika Rositawati; Priskila Siahaya	Turkey; Özge Bayrak; Cemre Fere; Neslihan Kılıç; Neslihan Yiğit
Mixed doubles	Malaysia; Mohd Lutfi Zaim Abdul Khalid; Amelia Alicia Anscelly	Malaysia; Wong Fai Yin; Shevon Jemie Lai	Indonesia; Danang Haryandika; Inten Ratnasari
Mixed doubles	Malaysia; Mohd Lutfi Zaim Abdul Khalid; Amelia Alicia Anscelly	Malaysia; Wong Fai Yin; Shevon Jemie Lai	Turkey; Ramazan Öztürk; Neslihan Kılıç

== Medal table ==
Rank	Nation	Gold	Silver	Bronze	Total
1	Malaysia (MAS)	6	3	1	10
2	Turkey (TUR)	1	1	5	7
3	Indonesia (INA)	0	3	6	9
Totals (3 entries)		7	7	12	26
