= Wushu at the 2013 Islamic Solidarity Games =

Wushu at the 2013 Islamic Solidarity Games is held in Jaka Baring Gymnastic Hall, Palembang, Indonesia from 28 September to 1 October 2013.

== Medalists ==
=== Men's taolu ===
Event	Gold	Silver	Bronze
Changquan	Wong Weng Son; Malaysia	Khaw Jun Lim; Malaysia	Ehsan Peighambari; Iran
Jianshu / Qiangshu	Wong Weng Son; Malaysia	Ahmed Maher; Egypt	Saddam Al-Rahomi; Yemen
Nanquan	Farshad Arabi; Iran	Gjeblehim Bong; Malaysia	Kevan Cheah; Malaysia
Nandao / Nangun	Kevan Cheah; Malaysia	Gjeblehim Bong; Malaysia	Mohamed Abdelrahman; Egypt
Daoshu / Gunshu	Achmad Hulaefi; Indonesia	Khaw Jun Lim; Malaysia	Aldy Lukman; Indonesia
Taijiquan	Fredy Wijaya; Indonesia	Marthen Tangdilallo; Indonesia	Mohamed Nagi; Egypt
Taijijian	Marthen Tangdilallo; Indonesia	Fredy Wijaya; Indonesia	Loh Choon How; Malaysia
Duilian	Iran; Ebrahim Fathi; Mohsen Ahmadi; Navid Makvandi	Brunei; Md Sufi Shayiran Roslan; Md Adi Sya'rani Roslan	Yemen; Hamdi Al-Yaresi; Saddam Al-Rahomi

=== Men's sanda ===
Event	Gold	Silver	Bronze
48 kg	Ade Permana; Indonesia	Ahmed Ashraf; Egypt	Mok Boon Xuan; Malaysia
48 kg	Ade Permana; Indonesia	Ahmed Ashraf; Egypt	Zaid Wazea; Yemen
52 kg	Moein Hajizadeh; Iran	Gunawan; Indonesia	Meziane Rebbouh; Algeria
52 kg	Moein Hajizadeh; Iran	Gunawan; Indonesia	Şohrat Orazgeldiýew; Turkmenistan
56 kg	Ali Bakhtiari; Iran	Harinto Jaya Putra; Indonesia	Fares Argoubi; Tunisia
56 kg	Ali Bakhtiari; Iran	Harinto Jaya Putra; Indonesia	Elchin Eminov; Azerbaijan
60 kg	Hendrik Tarigan; Indonesia	Ali Yousefi; Iran	Ali Ay; Turkey
60 kg	Hendrik Tarigan; Indonesia	Ali Yousefi; Iran	Khalil Machraoui; Tunisia
65 kg	Mohsen Mohammadseifi; Iran	Ruslan Piraliyev; Azerbaijan	Goçmyrat Jumanyýazow; Turkmenistan
65 kg	Mohsen Mohammadseifi; Iran	Ruslan Piraliyev; Azerbaijan	Ramzi Benabdellah; Algeria
70 kg	Sajjad Abbasi; Iran	Abdelhakim Moumou; Algeria	Elias El-Rayess; Lebanon
70 kg	Sajjad Abbasi; Iran	Abdelhakim Moumou; Algeria	Ömer Allar; Turkey

=== Women's taolu ===
Event	Gold	Silver	Bronze
Changquan	Loh Ying Ting; Malaysia	Hanieh Rajabi; Iran	Nafiseh Pourganji; Iran
Jianshu / Qiangshu	Elif Akyüz; Turkey	Hale Beyza Sarıyıldız; Turkey	None awarded
Nanquan	Juwita Niza Wasni; Indonesia	Ivana Ardelia Irmanto; Indonesia	Angy Hany; Egypt
Nandao / Nangun	Ivana Ardelia Irmanto; Indonesia	Juwita Niza Wasni; Indonesia	Tan Cheong Min; Malaysia
Taijiquan	Lindswell Kwok; Indonesia	Chan Lu Yi; Malaysia	Hamideh Barkhor; Iran
Taijijian	Lindswell Kwok; Indonesia	Chan Lu Yi; Malaysia	Hamideh Barkhor; Iran

== Medal table ==
Rank	Nation	Gold	Silver	Bronze	Total
1	Indonesia (INA)	9	6	1	16
2	Iran (IRI)	6	2	4	12
3	Malaysia (MAS)	4	6	4	14
4	Turkey (TUR)	1	1	2	4
5	Egypt (EGY)	0	2	3	5
6	Algeria (ALG)	0	1	2	3
7	Azerbaijan (AZE)	0	1	1	2
8	Brunei (BRU)	0	1	0	1
9	Yemen (YEM)	0	0	3	3
10	Tunisia (TUN)	0	0	2	2
10	Turkmenistan (TKM)	0	0	2	2
12	Lebanon (LIB)	0	0	1	1
Totals (12 entries)		20	20	25	65
