= Ika Yuliana Rochmawati =

Indonesian archer (born 1989)

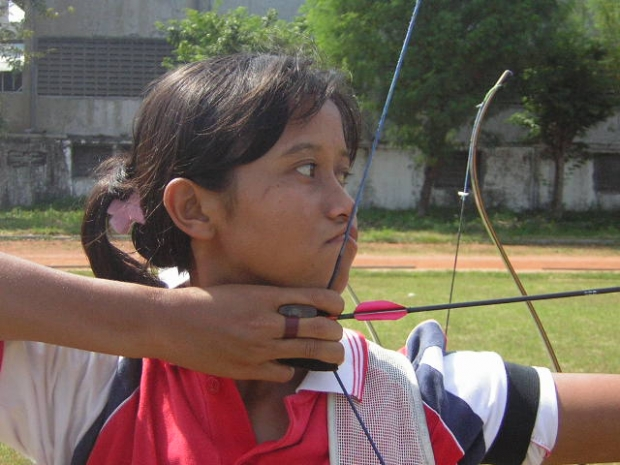

Personal information
- Born: 2 July 1989 (age 37) Bojonegoro, East Java, Indonesia
- Height: 1.65 m (5 ft 5 in)
- Weight: 51 kg (112 lb)

Sport
- Country: Indonesia
- Sport: Archery
- Event: Individual recurve
Medal record
Women's archery
Representing Indonesia
World Cup
| Gold medal – first place | 2014 Wroclaw | Individual |
Asian Grand Prix
| Gold medal – first place | 2013 Bangkok | Individual |
| Silver medal – second place | 2011 Vientiane | Women's team |
| Silver medal – second place | 2015 Bangkok | Women's team |
| Silver medal – second place | 2015 Bangkok | Mixed team |
| Bronze medal – third place | 2013 Bangkok | Women's team |
Islamic Solidarity Games
| Gold medal – first place | 2013 Palembang | Individual |
| Gold medal – first place | 2013 Palembang | Mixed team |
| Silver medal – second place | 2013 Palembang | Women's team |
SEA Games
| Gold medal – first place | 2007 Nakhon Ratchasima | Individual |
| Gold medal – first place | 2007 Nakhon Ratchasima | Women's team |
| Gold medal – first place | 2009 Vientiane | Women's team |
| Gold medal – first place | 2013 Naypyidaw | Women's team |
| Gold medal – first place | 2015 Singapore | Mixed team |
| Silver medal – second place | 2015 Singapore | Women's team |
| Bronze medal – third place | 2013 Naypyidaw | Individual |
| Bronze medal – third place | 2013 Naypyidaw | Mixed team |

Ika Yuliana Rochmawati (born 2 July 1989) is an Indonesian archer. She competed in the individual recurve event at the 2008, 2012 and 2016 Olympics with the best result of ninth place in 2012.

== Career ==
At the 2008 Summer Olympics in Beijing Rochmawati finished her ranking round with a total of 621 points. This gave her the 41st seed for the final competition bracket in which she faced Jennifer Nichols in the first round. Rochmawati was eliminated with a 114–101 score.

At the 2012 Olympic Games, Rochmawati finished her ranking round as the 76th seed. She subsequently beat 3rd seed Fang Yuting (China) (6–4) in the 1/32 elimination round and 37th seed Amy Oliver (Great Britain) 7–1 in the 1/16 elimination round. She qualified for the Round of 16 on 1 August 2012, where she lost to Russia's Ksenia Perova. At the 2016 Olympics she was eliminated in the first round.
