= Taekwondo at the 2005 Islamic Solidarity Games =

Taekwondo competition

Taekwondo at the 2005 Islamic Solidarity Games was held in Umm al-Qura University Hall, Mecca from April 11 to April 14, 2005.

== Medalists ==
Event	Gold	Silver	Bronze
Finweight −54 kg	Ali Abdulla; Qatar	Naskhidin Vorisov; Tajikistan	Wisam Oraibi; Iraq
Finweight −54 kg	Ali Abdulla; Qatar	Naskhidin Vorisov; Tajikistan	Ayman Al-Adarbi; Jordan
Flyweight −58 kg	Majid Julwah; Saudi Arabia	Hadfi Abdelmajid; Morocco	Satriyo Rahadhani; Indonesia
Flyweight −58 kg	Majid Julwah; Saudi Arabia	Hadfi Abdelmajid; Morocco	Birane Guèye; Senegal
Bantamweight −62 kg	Abdeladim Ammouri; Morocco	Mina Fayez; Egypt	Babek Isgandarov; Azerbaijan
Bantamweight −62 kg	Abdeladim Ammouri; Morocco	Mina Fayez; Egypt	Afifuddin Omar Sidek; Malaysia
Featherweight −67 kg	Alireza Nasr Azadani; Iran	Anas Aqlan; Yemen	Syed Taufiq Abd Hamid; Malaysia
Featherweight −67 kg	Alireza Nasr Azadani; Iran	Anas Aqlan; Yemen	Hani Al-Matrafi; Saudi Arabia
Lightweight −72 kg	Nabil Talal; Jordan	Serdar Akın; Turkey	Nesar Ahmad Bahave; Afghanistan
Lightweight −72 kg	Nabil Talal; Jordan	Serdar Akın; Turkey	Malek Aqlan; Yemen
Welterweight −78 kg	Basuki Nugroho; Indonesia	Abdoulaye Mbaye; Senegal	Salam Fawzi; Iraq
Welterweight −78 kg	Basuki Nugroho; Indonesia	Abdoulaye Mbaye; Senegal	Aziz Mehdi Bahij; Morocco
Middleweight −84 kg	Hamed Khamseh; Iran	Ali Johar; Saudi Arabia	Seyni Ndiaye Mbow; Senegal
Middleweight −84 kg	Hamed Khamseh; Iran	Ali Johar; Saudi Arabia	Souheil Hammami; Tunisia
Heavyweight +84 kg	Tariq Habaib; Jordan	Mehdi Navaei; Iran	Momar Faye; Senegal
Heavyweight +84 kg	Tariq Habaib; Jordan	Mehdi Navaei; Iran	Mahmoud Charef; Tunisia

== Medal table ==
Rank	Nation	Gold	Silver	Bronze	Total
1	Iran	2	1	0	3
2	Jordan	2	0	1	3
3	Morocco	1	1	1	3
3	Saudi Arabia	1	1	1	3
5	Indonesia	1	0	1	2
6	Qatar	1	0	0	1
7	Senegal	0	1	3	4
8	Yemen	0	1	1	2
9	Egypt	0	1	0	1
9	Tajikistan	0	1	0	1
9	Turkey	0	1	0	1
12	Iraq	0	0	2	2
12	Malaysia	0	0	2	2
12	Tunisia	0	0	2	2
15	Afghanistan	0	0	1	1
15	Azerbaijan	0	0	1	1
Totals (16 entries)		8	8	16	32
