= Tennis at the 2013 Islamic Solidarity Games =

Tennis at the 2013 Islamic Solidarity Games is held in Jaka Baring Tennis Court, Palembang, Indonesia from 24 September to 29 September 2013.

== Medalists ==
=== Men ===
Event	Gold	Silver	Bronze
Singles	Christopher Rungkat; Indonesia	Mohamed Hassen; Algeria	Barış Fırat; Turkey
Singles	Christopher Rungkat; Indonesia	Mohamed Hassen; Algeria	Barkın Yalçınkale; Turkey
Doubles	Indonesia; Christopher Rungkat; Elbert Sie	Indonesia; Wisnu Adi Nugroho; David Agung Susanto	Turkey; Gökberk Ergeneman; Barkın Yalçınkale
Doubles	Indonesia; Christopher Rungkat; Elbert Sie	Indonesia; Wisnu Adi Nugroho; David Agung Susanto	Turkey; Altuğ Çelikbilek; Barış Fırat
Team	Indonesia; Elbert Sie; Christopher Rungkat; David Agung Susanto; Wisnu Adi Nugroho	Kuwait; Abdullah Maqdes; Hassan Al-Mousa; Mohammad Ghareeb; Ali Al-Ghareeb	Saudi Arabia; Fahad Al-Saad; Abdulrahman Al-Azzam; Ammar Al-Haqbani; Abdulmalek Burasais
Team	Indonesia; Elbert Sie; Christopher Rungkat; David Agung Susanto; Wisnu Adi Nugroho	Kuwait; Abdullah Maqdes; Hassan Al-Mousa; Mohammad Ghareeb; Ali Al-Ghareeb	Turkey; Altuğ Çelikbilek; Barış Fırat; Barkın Yalçınkale; Gökberk Ergeneman

=== Women ===
Event	Gold	Silver	Bronze
Singles	Fatma Al-Nabhani; Oman	Lavinia Tananta; Indonesia	Nadia Lalami; Morocco
Singles	Fatma Al-Nabhani; Oman	Lavinia Tananta; Indonesia	Melis Bayraktaroğlu; Turkey
Doubles	Indonesia; Lavinia Tananta; Cynthia Melita	Indonesia; Mia Sacca; Heravita Mediana	Turkey; Melis Bayraktaroğlu; Hazal Ünlügenç
Doubles	Indonesia; Lavinia Tananta; Cynthia Melita	Indonesia; Mia Sacca; Heravita Mediana	Turkey; Gülben Güldaş; Ege Tomey
Team	Indonesia; Lavinia Tananta; Cynthia Melita; Mia Sacca; Heravita Mediana	Morocco; Fatima El-Allami; Nadia Lalami; Lina Qostal; Rita Atik	Turkey; Melis Bayraktaroğlu; Gülben Güldaş; Ege Tomey; Hazal Ünlügenç
Team	Indonesia; Lavinia Tananta; Cynthia Melita; Mia Sacca; Heravita Mediana	Morocco; Fatima El-Allami; Nadia Lalami; Lina Qostal; Rita Atik	Oman; Fatma Al-Nabhani; Sarah Al-Balushi

== Medal table ==
Rank	Nation	Gold	Silver	Bronze	Total
1	Indonesia (INA)	5	3	0	8
2	Oman (OMA)	1	0	1	2
3	Morocco (MAR)	0	1	1	2
4	Algeria (ALG)	0	1	0	1
4	Kuwait (KUW)	0	1	0	1
6	Turkey (TUR)	0	0	9	9
7	Saudi Arabia (KSA)	0	0	1	1
Totals (7 entries)		6	6	12	24
