= Taekwondo at the 2013 Islamic Solidarity Games =

Taekwondo competition

- Venue: Sriwijaya Promotion
- Location: Palembang, Indonesia
- Dates: 28 September - 1 October

Taekwando at the 2013 Islamic Solidarity Games is held in Sriwijaya Promotion, Palembang, Indonesia from 28 September to 1 October 2013.

== Medalists ==
=== Poomsae ===
Event	Gold	Silver	Bronze
Men's individual	Maulana Haidir; Indonesia	Hossein Beheshti; Iran	Yong Jin Kun; Malaysia
Men's individual	Maulana Haidir; Indonesia	Hossein Beheshti; Iran	Ali Kemal Ustabaş; Turkey
Men's team	Iran; Hossein Beheshti; Mehdi Jamali; Mohammad Naderi	Indonesia; Maulana Haidir; Abdurrahman Wahyu; Fazza Fitracahyo	Malaysia; Choo Hong Kai; Kok Jun Ee; Yong Jin Kun
Men's team	Iran; Hossein Beheshti; Mehdi Jamali; Mohammad Naderi	Indonesia; Maulana Haidir; Abdurrahman Wahyu; Fazza Fitracahyo	Egypt; Ahmed Mohamed Ezzat; Ibrahim Amr Selim; Shehabeldin Nabil
Women's individual	Nastaran Maleki; Iran	Defia Rosmaniar; Indonesia	Nada Mohamed Ezzat; Egypt
Women's individual	Nastaran Maleki; Iran	Defia Rosmaniar; Indonesia	Fajar Ebrahim; Bahrain
Women's team	Iran; Bahareh Ghaderian; Mahsa Mardani; Nastaran Maleki	Turkey; Elif Soytürk Akın; Elif Aybüke Yılmaz; Serim Olgun Kahveci	Indonesia; Defia Rosmaniar; Mutiara Habiba; Muttaqoh Khoirun Nisa
Women's team	Iran; Bahareh Ghaderian; Mahsa Mardani; Nastaran Maleki	Turkey; Elif Soytürk Akın; Elif Aybüke Yılmaz; Serim Olgun Kahveci	Egypt; Marwa Assem; Nada Mohamed Ezzat; Caroline Maher
Mixed pair	Iran; Mehdi Jamali; Mahsa Mardani	Indonesia; Abdurrahman Wahyu; Defia Rosmaniar	Turkey; Adil Tekin; Serim Olgun Kahveci
Mixed pair	Iran; Mehdi Jamali; Mahsa Mardani	Indonesia; Abdurrahman Wahyu; Defia Rosmaniar	Malaysia; Chew Wei Yan; Jocelyn Chai

=== Men's kyorugi ===
Event	Gold	Silver	Bronze
Finweight −54 kg	Muatasem Abuzaid; Jordan	Saud Al-Mutairi; Saudi Arabia	Lai Teik Woon; Malaysia
Finweight −54 kg	Muatasem Abuzaid; Jordan	Saud Al-Mutairi; Saudi Arabia	Mikayil Aliyev; Azerbaijan
Flyweight −58 kg	Aggie Seftyan Prasbowo; Indonesia	Mohammad Khalifah; Jordan	Ömer Ramazan Evez; Turkey
Flyweight −58 kg	Aggie Seftyan Prasbowo; Indonesia	Mohammad Khalifah; Jordan	Mohamed Ali Melghagh; Morocco
Bantamweight −63 kg	Ouahid Briki; Tunisia	Umut Bildik; Turkey	Bandar Jaafari; Saudi Arabia
Bantamweight −63 kg	Ouahid Briki; Tunisia	Umut Bildik; Turkey	Mohamed Asal; Egypt
Featherweight −68 kg	Mohammad Bagheri Motamed; Iran	Gökhan Coşar; Turkey	Junaidi Alfred Blegur; Indonesia
Featherweight −68 kg	Mohammad Bagheri Motamed; Iran	Gökhan Coşar; Turkey	Balla Dièye; Senegal
Lightweight −74 kg	Behnam Bayat; Iran	Ahmed Maher Saad; Qatar	Gorome Karé; Senegal
Lightweight −74 kg	Behnam Bayat; Iran	Ahmed Maher Saad; Qatar	Rıdvan Akın; Turkey
Welterweight −80 kg	Issam Chernoubi; Morocco	Afshin Saket; Iran	Burak Ozan Karaca; Turkey
Welterweight −80 kg	Issam Chernoubi; Morocco	Afshin Saket; Iran	Oussama Oueslati; Tunisia
Middleweight −87 kg	Omid Amidi; Iran	Jamal Hadea; Libya	Basuki Nugroho; Indonesia
Middleweight −87 kg	Omid Amidi; Iran	Jamal Hadea; Libya	Abdulmajeed Al-Khalifah; Saudi Arabia
Heavyweight +87 kg	Mehdi Khodabakhshi; Iran	Serdar Yüksel; Turkey	Mohamed El-Kharzazi; Morocco
Heavyweight +87 kg	Mehdi Khodabakhshi; Iran	Serdar Yüksel; Turkey	Hamad Al-Binkhalil; Bahrain

=== Women's kyorugi ===
Event	Gold	Silver	Bronze
Finweight −46 kg	Aghniny Haque; Indonesia	Shakila Dharshini; Malaysia	Aya Rouby; Egypt
Finweight −46 kg	Aghniny Haque; Indonesia	Shakila Dharshini; Malaysia	Turkana Tahirli; Azerbaijan
Flyweight −49 kg	Nour Abdelsalam; Egypt	Sanaa Atabrour; Morocco	Patimat Abakarova; Azerbaijan
Flyweight −49 kg	Nour Abdelsalam; Egypt	Sanaa Atabrour; Morocco	Dwi Regina Ismail; Malaysia
Bantamweight −53 kg	Radwa Reda; Egypt	Samaneh Sheshpari; Iran	Şeyma Tuncer; Turkey
Bantamweight −53 kg	Radwa Reda; Egypt	Samaneh Sheshpari; Iran	Nur Dhia Liyana; Malaysia
Featherweight −57 kg	Sousan Hajipour; Iran	Gunay Aghakishiyeva; Azerbaijan	Shahd Al-Tarman; Jordan
Featherweight −57 kg	Sousan Hajipour; Iran	Gunay Aghakishiyeva; Azerbaijan	Hajiba Enhari; Morocco
Lightweight −62 kg	Dürdane Altunel; Turkey	Hedaya Malak; Egypt	Julyana Al-Sadeq; Jordan
Lightweight −62 kg	Dürdane Altunel; Turkey	Hedaya Malak; Egypt	Parisa Farshidi; Iran
Welterweight −67 kg	Shokraneh Izadi; Iran	Hakima El-Meslahy; Morocco	Rewan Abdelfattah; Egypt
Welterweight −67 kg	Shokraneh Izadi; Iran	Hakima El-Meslahy; Morocco	Mbassa Sakho; Senegal
Middleweight −73 kg	Fatemeh Rouhani; Iran	Jehabut Selviana; Indonesia	Shraboni Biswas; Bangladesh
Middleweight −73 kg	Fatemeh Rouhani; Iran	Jehabut Selviana; Indonesia	Mouna Benabderrassoul; Morocco
Heavyweight +73 kg	Akram Khodabandeh; Iran	Nafia Kuş; Turkey	Shirley Kua; Malaysia
Heavyweight +73 kg	Akram Khodabandeh; Iran	Nafia Kuş; Turkey	Eka Sahara; Indonesia

== Medal table ==
Rank	Nation	Gold	Silver	Bronze	Total
1	Iran (IRI)	12	3	1	16
2	Indonesia (INA)	3	4	4	11
3	Egypt (EGY)	2	1	6	9
4	Turkey (TUR)	1	5	6	12
5	Morocco (MAR)	1	2	4	7
6	Jordan (JOR)	1	1	2	4
7	Tunisia (TUN)	1	0	1	2
8	Malaysia (MAS)	0	1	7	8
9	Azerbaijan (AZE)	0	1	3	4
10	Saudi Arabia (KSA)	0	1	2	3
11	Libya (LBA)	0	1	0	1
11	Qatar (QAT)	0	1	0	1
13	Senegal (SEN)	0	0	3	3
14	Bahrain (BHR)	0	0	2	2
15	Bangladesh (BAN)	0	0	1	1
Totals (15 entries)		21	21	42	84
