= 2013 Islamic Solidarity Games =

Multi-sport competition held in Palembang, Indonesia

3rd Islamic Solidarity Games
- Host city: Palembang, South Sumatera
- Country: Indonesia
- Motto: Harmony in Unity
- Nations: 57
- Events: 13 sports
- Opening: 22 September 2013
- Closing: 1 October 2013
- Opened by: President Susilo Bambang Yudhoyono
- Main venue: Gelora Sriwijaya Stadium

The 3rd Islamic Solidarity Games (Indonesian: Pesta Olahraga Solidaritas Islam 2013) was an international sporting event held in Palembang, Indonesia from 22 September to 1 October 2013. The 2009 event, originally scheduled to take place in Iran, and later rescheduled for April 2010, was cancelled after a dispute arose between Iran and the Arab countries.

== Host selection ==
Indonesia was announced as the host for the Games in April 2011 with Pekanbaru, Riau, as the host city. However, the Games were then relocated to Jakarta citing lack of standard at some venues combined with a corruption case involving Governor of Riau, Rusli Zainal. Palembang was finally selected as the host city and the Games were delayed about three months from the original timeframe in June.

== Venues ==
Venue Name	Sports
Dempo Sport Hall	Badminton
PSCC Palembang Sport Hall	Basketball, Volleyball
Graha Serbaguna Jakabaring	Weightlifting
Jakabaring Athletic Stadium	Athletics
Jakabaring Beach Volleyball Arena	Beach Volleyball
Jakabaring Gymnastic Hall	Wushu
Gelora Sriwijaya Stadium	Opening Ceremony, Closing Ceremony, Football
Jakabaring Archery Field	Archery
Jakabaring Aquatic Stadium	Swimming
Bukit Asam Tennis Court	Tennis
Bumi Sriwijaya Stadium	Football
Sriwijaya Promotion Centre	Karate, Taekwondo

== Participating nations ==
There are 57 nations participating in 2013 Islamic Solidarity Games.

Participating National Committees
- Afghanistan
- Albania
- Algeria
- Azerbaijan
- Bahrain
- Bangladesh
- Benin
- Brunei
- Burkina Faso
- Cameroon
- Chad
- Comoros
- Djibouti
- Egypt
- Gabon
- Gambia
- Guinea
- Guinea-Bissau
- Guyana
- Indonesia
- Iran
- Iraq
- Ivory Coast
- Jordan
- Kazakhstan
- Kuwait
- Kyrgyzstan
- Lebanon
- Libya
- Malaysia
- Maldives
- Mali
- Mauritania
- Morocco
- Mozambique
- Niger
- Nigeria
- Oman
- Pakistan
- Palestine
- Qatar
- Saudi Arabia
- Senegal
- Sierra Leone
- Somalia
- Sudan
- Suriname
- Syria
- Tajikistan
- Togo
- Tunisia
- Turkey
- Turkmenistan
- Uganda
- United Arab Emirates
- Uzbekistan
- Yemen

== Sports ==
2013 Islamic Solidarity Games sports programme
- Aquatics
  - Swimming (40)
- Archery (10)
- Athletics (42)
- Badminton (7)
- Basketball (2)
- Football (1)
- Karate (17)
- Taekwondo (21)
- Tennis (6)
- Volleyball (3)
  - Indoor volleyball (1)
  - Beach volleyball (2)
- Weightlifting (15)
- Wushu (20)

== Schedule ==
OC	Opening ceremony	●	Event competitions	1	Event finals	CC	Closing ceremony

September/October	18 Wed	19 Thu	20 Fri	21 Sat	22 Sun	23 Mon	24 Tue	25 Wed	26 Thu	27 Fri	28 Sat	29 Sun	30 Mon	1 Tue	Events
Ceremonies					OC									CC	
Athletics							5	10	5	8	8	5	1		42
Archery					●	●	2	2	2	2	2				10
Aquatics-Swimming						●	6	6	7	7	7	7			40
Badminton	●	●	●	2	●	●	●	5							7
Basketball				●	●	●	●	●	●		●	●	2		2
Football		●				●		●		●		1			1
Karate					4	6	5	2							17
Taekwondo										4	6	4	4	3	21
Tennis				●	●	●	●	2	●	●	●	●	4		6
Volleyball Indoor						●	●	●	●	●	●	●	1		1
Volleyball Beach						●	●	●	●	●	2				2
Weightlifting							4	4	3	4					15
Wushu											3	4	6	7	20

== Medal table ==
* Host nation (Indonesia)

Rank	Nation	Gold	Silver	Bronze	Total
1	Indonesia (INA)*	36	34	34	104
2	Iran (IRI)	30	17	12	59
3	Egypt (EGY)	26	31	29	86
4	Malaysia (MAS)	26	17	29	72
5	Turkey (TUR)	23	30	50	103
6	Morocco (MAR)	10	15	14	39
7	Saudi Arabia (KSA)	7	3	6	16
8	Azerbaijan (AZE)	6	9	9	24
9	Algeria (ALG)	5	6	8	19
10	Oman (OMA)	3	2	5	10
11	Bahrain (BHR)	2	1	4	7
12	Syria (SYR)	2	1	3	6
13	Iraq (IRQ)	2	1	1	4
14	Tunisia (TUN)	2	0	7	9
15	Kuwait (KUW)	1	4	3	8
16	Qatar (QAT)	1	2	2	5
17	Jordan (JOR)	1	1	2	4
18	Guyana (GUY)	0	2	0	2
19	United Arab Emirates (UAE)	0	1	3	4
20	Bangladesh (BAN)	0	1	1	2
20	Libya (LBA)	0	1	1	2
22	Brunei (BRU)	0	1	0	1
22	Palestine (PLE)	0	1	0	1
24	Turkmenistan (TKM)	0	0	4	4
25	Senegal (SEN)	0	0	3	3
25	Yemen (YEM)	0	0	3	3
27	Cameroon (CMR)	0	0	1	1
27	Lebanon (LIB)	0	0	1	1
27	Sierra Leone (SLE)	0	0	1	1
Totals (29 entries)		183	181	236	600

== Bikini controversy ==
The Games faced a controversy over female athletes competing in sports bikinis. Some participating nations demanded that all sportswomen competing in the athletics, beach volleyball and swimming events wear body-covering sporting outfits instead of the usual, functional and official sports bikinis regulated by international rules. In some countries of the Muslim world, sporting suits for women called burqini, which cover the whole body except the face, the hands and the feet, are in use in accordance with Islamic culture. Furthermore, some countries asked the organizers to run the male and female events on separate days. Both regulations were applied in the first edition of the Games held in Saudi Arabia in 2005.

The organizing committee refused to fully comply with the demands stating that only the countries ruled by Islamic governments among the 44 participants with Muslim population opposed the two-piece sporting outfits standardized in international sports dress code. The organizers ruled that the use of sports bikinis was optional so that sportswomen may wear religious-based outfits.
