= Turkey at the 2017 Islamic Solidarity Games =

- IOC code: TUR
- NOC: Turkish Olympic Committee

in Baku, Azerbaijan
- Medals: Gold 70 Silver 68 Bronze 57 Total 195

Islamic Solidarity Games appearances (overview)
- 2005; 2013; 2017; 2021; 2025

Turkey participated in the 2017 Islamic Solidarity Games held in Baku, Azerbaijan from 12 to 22 May 201. 336 athletes from Turkey were registered to compete in 20 sports at the Games.

== Medalists ==
Medal	Name	Sport	Event	Date
Gold	Ramil Guliyev	Athletics	Men's 100 m	16 May
Gold	Ramil Guliyev	Athletics	Men's 200 m	16 May
Gold	Eşref Apak	Athletics	Men's hammer throw	16 May
Gold	Osman Can Özdeveci	Athletics	Men's shot put	16 May
Gold	Yasemin Can	Athletics	Women's 10000 m	16 May
Gold	Buse Arıkazan	Athletics	Women's pole vault	16 May
Gold	Eda Tuğsuz	Athletics	Women's javelin throw	16 May
Gold	Enis Ünsal; Batuhan Altıntaş; Sinan Ören; Yavuz Can	Athletics	Men's 4 × 400 m relay	20 May
Gold	Kıvanç Gür	Diving	Men's 10 m platform	21 May
Gold	Ahmet Önder; Ferhat Arıcan; İbrahim Çolak	Gymnastics	Men's artistic team	12 May
Gold	İbrahim Çolak	Gymnastics	Rings	13 May
Gold	Ahmet Önder	Gymnastics	Vault	13 May
Gold	Ferhat Arıcan	Gymnastics	Parallel bars	13 May
Gold	Demet Mutlu	Gymnastics	Uneven bars	13 May
Gold	Göksu Üçtaş	Gymnastics	Balance beam	13 May
Gold	İrem Korkmaz	Judo	Women's half lightweight	13 May
Gold	Büşra Katipoğlu	Judo	Women's half middleweight	13 May
Gold	Kayra Sayit	Judo	Women's heavyweight	13 May
Gold	Şükran Bakacak; Çağrı Güzelsoy; Büşra Katipoğlu; İrem Korkmaz; Dilara Lokmanhekim; Nazlıcan Özerler; Kayra Sayit	Judo	Women's team	15 May
Gold	Dilara Bozan	Karate	Women's kata	14 May
Gold	Meltem Hocaoğlu	Karate	Women's kumite +68 kg	14 May
Gold	Yusuf Dikeç	Shooting	Men's 50 m pistol	17 May
Gold	Ömer Akgün	Shooting	Men's 10 m air rifle	17 May
Gold	Nihan Gürer	Shooting	Women's trap	17 May
Gold	Nur Banu Özpak	Shooting	Women's skeet	17 May
Gold	Ege Başer	Swimming	Men's 200 m backstroke	17 May
Gold	Demir Atasoy	Swimming	Men's 50 m breaststroke	17 May
Gold	Demir Atasoy	Swimming	Men's 100 m breaststroke	17 May
Gold	Berk Özkul	Swimming	Men's 50 m butterfly	17 May
Gold	Kaan Türker Ayar	Swimming	Men's 100 m butterfly	17 May
Gold	Metin Aydın	Swimming	Men's 200 m individual medley	17 May
Gold	İlknur Nihan Çakıcı	Swimming	Women's 50 m freestyle	17 May
Gold	İlknur Nihan Çakıcı	Swimming	Women's 100 m freestyle	17 May
Gold	Selen Özbilen	Swimming	Women's 200 m freestyle	17 May
Gold	Ekaterina Avramova	Swimming	Women's 50 m backstroke	17 May
Gold	Ekaterina Avramova	Swimming	Women's 100 m backstroke	17 May
Gold	Ekaterina Avramova	Swimming	Women's 200 m backstroke	17 May
Gold	Gülşen Beste Samancı	Swimming	Women's 50 m breaststroke	17 May
Gold	Viktoriya Zeynep Güneş	Swimming	Women's 100 m breaststroke	17 May
Gold	Viktoriya Zeynep Güneş	Swimming	Women's 200 m breaststroke	17 May
Gold	Viktoriya Zeynep Güneş	Swimming	Women's 200 m individual medley	17 May
Gold	Viktoriya Zeynep Güneş	Swimming	Women's 400 m individual medley	17 May
Gold	Aleyna Özkan	Swimming	Women's 50 m butterfly	17 May
Gold	Aleyna Özkan	Swimming	Women's 100 m butterfly	17 May
Gold	Nida Eliz Üstündağ	Swimming	Women's 200 m butterfly	17 May
Gold	Doğa Çelik; İskender Başlakov; Kemal Arda Gürdal; Hüseyin Emre Sakçı	Swimming	Men's 4 × 100 m freestyle relay	17 May
Gold	Erge Can Gezmiş; Nezir Karap; Kaan Özcan; Doğa Çelik	Swimming	Men's 4 × 200 m freestyle relay	17 May
Gold	Ege Başer; Demir Atasoy; Kaan Türker Ayar; Doğa Çelik	Swimming	Men's 4 × 100 m medley relay	17 May
Gold	İlknur Nihan Çakıcı; Sezin Eligül; Esra Kübra Kaçmaz; Ekaterina Avramova	Swimming	Women's 4 × 100 m freestyle relay	17 May
Gold	Sezin Eligül; Selen Özbilen; Esra Kübra Kaçmaz; Gizem Bozkurt	Swimming	Women's 4 × 200 m freestyle relay	17 May
Gold	Ekaterina Avramova; Viktoriya Zeynep Güneş; Aleyna Özkan; İlknur Nihan Çakıcı	Swimming	Women's 4 × 100 m medley relay	17 May
Gold	Melek Hu	Table tennis	Women's singles	22 May
Gold	Rukiye Yıldırım	Taekwondo	Women's finweight	18 May
Gold	İrem Yaman	Taekwondo	Women's lightweight	18 May
Gold	Nur Tatar	Taekwondo	Women's welterweight	18 May
Gold	Sude Bulut	Taekwondo	Women's middleweight	18 May
Gold	Nafia Kuş	Taekwondo	Women's heavyweight	18 May
Gold	Altuğ Çelikbilek	Tennis	Men's singles	22 May
Gold	Ayla Aksu	Tennis	Women's singles	22 May
Gold	Sarp Ağabigün; Altuğ Çelikbilek	Tennis	Men's doubles	22 May
Gold	Ayla Aksu; Berfu Cengiz	Tennis	Women's doubles	22 May
Gold	Sarp Ağabigün; Altuğ Çelikbilek; Muhammet Haylaz; Anıl Yüksel	Tennis	Men's team	22 May
Gold	Ayla Aksu; Berfu Cengiz; Başak Eraydın; Melis Sezer	Tennis	Women's team	22 May
Gold	Turkey men's national water polo team	Water polo	Men's team	17 May
Gold	Daniyar İsmayilov	Weightlifting	Men's 69 kg	14 May
Gold	Bediha Tunadağı	Weightlifting	Women's 53 kg	13 May
Gold	Sümeyye Kentli	Weightlifting	Women's 58 kg	13 May
Gold	Osman Yıldırım	Wrestling	Men's Greco-Roman 130 kg	21 May
Gold	Yasemin Adar	Wrestling	Women's freestyle 75 kg	21 May
Gold	Mehmet Demirci	Wushu	Men's 48 kg	22 May
Silver	Kaan Kigen Özbilen	Athletics	Men's 10000 m	16 May
Silver	Özkan Baltacı	Athletics	Men's hammer throw	16 May
Silver	Meryem Akdağ	Athletics	Women's 1500 m	16 May
Silver	Yasemin Can	Athletics	Women's 5000 m	16 May
Silver	Nevin Yanıt	Athletics	Women's 100 m hurdles	16 May
Silver	Demet Parlak	Athletics	Women's pole vault	16 May
Silver	Emel Dereli	Athletics	Women's shot put	16 May
Silver	Kıvılcım Kaya Salman	Athletics	Women's hammer throw	16 May
Silver	Yiğitcan Hekimoğlu; İzzet Safer; Emre Zafer Barnes; Ramil Guliyev	Athletics	Men's 4 × 100 m relay	20 May
Silver	Oğuz Akbulut; Mehmet Tunç; Suat Öner; Ahkan Cira	Athletics	4 × 100 m relay (T11/T12/T13)	20 May
Silver	Burak Aksın	Boxing	Heavyweight	18 May
Silver	Yaprak Selin Keskin	Diving	Women's 3 m springboard	21 May
Silver	Ferhat Arıcan	Gymnastics	Horizontal bar	13 May
Silver	Göksu Üçtaş	Gymnastics	Floor	13 May
Silver	Demet Mutlu; Ekin Morova; Göksu Üçtaş	Gymnastics	Women's artistic team	12 May
Silver	Turkey men's national handball team	Handball	Men's team	14 May
Silver	Turkey women's national handball team	Handball	Women's team	14 May
Silver	Bekir Özlü	Judo	Men's extra lightweight	13 May
Silver	İlker Güldüren	Judo	Men's half middleweight	13 May
Silver	Şükran Bakacak	Judo	Women's middleweight	13 May
Silver	Çağrı Güzelsoy	Judo	Women's half heavyweight	13 May
Silver	Mehmet Yakan	Karate	Men's kata	14 May
Silver	Aykut Kaya	Karate	Men's kumite 60 kg	14 May
Silver	Alparslan Yamanoğlu	Karate	Men's kumite 84 kg	14 May
Silver	Enes Erkan	Karate	Men's kumite +84 kg	14 May
Silver	Serap Özçelik	Karate	Women's kumite 50 kg	14 May
Silver	Eda Eltemur	Karate	Women's kumite 68 kg	14 May
Silver	Yusuf Dikeç	Shooting	Men's 10 m air pistol	17 May
Silver	Yusuf Dikeç	Shooting	Men's 25 m center fire pistol	17 May
Silver	Murat Kılıç	Shooting	Men's 25 m rapid fire pistol	17 May
Silver	Oğuzhan Tüzün	Shooting	Men's trap	17 May
Silver	Oğuzhan Tüzün; Nihan Gürer	Shooting	Trap team	17 May
Silver	Hüseyin Emre Sakçı	Swimming	Men's 50 m freestyle	17 May
Silver	Hüseyin Emre Sakçı	Swimming	Men's 50 m breaststroke	17 May
Silver	Hüseyin Emre Sakçı	Swimming	Men's 100 m breaststroke	17 May
Silver	Doğa Çelik	Swimming	Men's 100 m freestyle	17 May
Silver	Erge Can Gezmiş	Swimming	Men's 200 m freestyle	17 May
Silver	Alpkan Örnek	Swimming	Men's 200 m breaststroke	17 May
Silver	İlker Altınbilek	Swimming	Men's 50 m butterfly	17 May
Silver	Ümit Can Güreş	Swimming	Men's 100 m butterfly	17 May
Silver	Kaan Özcan	Swimming	Men's 200 m butterfly	17 May
Silver	Batuhan Hakan	Swimming	Men's 400 m individual medley	17 May
Silver	Gizem Bozkurt	Swimming	Women's 200 m freestyle	17 May
Silver	Selen Özbilen	Swimming	Women's 400 m freestyle	17 May
Silver	İlayda Kargın	Swimming	Women's 50 m backstroke	17 May
Silver	Halime Zülal Zeren	Swimming	Women's 100 m backstroke	17 May
Silver	Halime Zülal Zeren	Swimming	Women's 200 m backstroke	17 May
Silver	Viktoriya Zeynep Güneş	Swimming	Women's 50 m breaststroke	17 May
Silver	Gülşen Beste Samancı	Swimming	Women's 100 m breaststroke	17 May
Silver	Sezin Eligül	Swimming	Women's 50 m butterfly	17 May
Silver	Ahmet Li; İbrahim Gündüz; Gençay Menge; Batuhan Ulucak	Table tennis	Men's team	22 May
Silver	Yunus Sarı	Taekwondo	Men's welterweight	18 May
Silver	Zeliha Ağrıs	Taekwondo	Women's bantamweight	18 May
Silver	Dürdane Altunel	Taekwondo	Women's featherweight	18 May
Silver	Anıl Yüksel	Tennis	Men's singles	22 May
Silver	Berfu Cengiz	Tennis	Women's singles	22 May
Silver	Turkey women's national volleyball team	Volleyball	Women's team	21 May
Silver	Şaziye Erdoğan	Weightlifting	Women's 48 kg	13 May
Silver	Rabia Kaya	Weightlifting	Women's 75 kg	16 May
Silver	Soner Demirtaş	Wrestling	Men's freestyle 74 kg	19 May
Silver	Selim Yaşar	Wrestling	Men's freestyle 86 kg	19 May
Silver	Furkan Bayrak	Wrestling	Men's Greco-Roman 75 kg	20 May
Silver	Ali Cengiz	Wrestling	Men's Greco-Roman 85 kg	20 May
Silver	Evin Demirhan	Wrestling	Women's freestyle 48 kg	17 May
Silver	Burcu Kebiç	Wrestling	Women's freestyle 53 kg	17 May
Silver	Gamze Nur Adakan	Wrestling	Women's freestyle 60 kg	18 May
Silver	Hafize Şahin	Wrestling	Women's freestyle 63 kg	18 May
Silver	Sadık Pehlivan	Wushu	Men's 52 kg	22 May
Bronze	Aras Kaya	Athletics	Men's 3000 m steeplechase	16 May
Bronze	Mizgin Ay	Athletics	Women's 100 m	16 May
Bronze	Berivan Şakır	Athletics	Women's javelin throw	16 May
Bronze	Oğuz Akbulut	Athletics	Men's 400 m T12	16 May
Bronze	Mizgin Ay; Elif Yıldırım; Büşra Yıldırım; Meryem Akdağ	Athletics	Women's 4 × 400 m relay	20 May
Bronze	Cem Karlıdağ	Boxing	Light heavyweight	18 May
Bronze	Sinem Sağlam	Diving	Women's 10 m platform	21 May
Bronze	Ahmet Önder	Gymnastics	Floor	13 May
Bronze	Ahmet Önder	Gymnastics	Horizontal bar	13 May
Bronze	Ekin Morova	Gymnastics	Uneven bars	13 May
Bronze	Demet Mutlu	Gymnastics	Uneven bars	13 May
Bronze	Ecem Çankaya; Selen Bektaş; Başak Nida Karaevli	Gymnastics	Women's rhythmic team	12 May
Bronze	Sinan Sandal	Judo	Men's half lightweight	13 May
Bronze	Batuhan Efemgil	Judo	Men's middleweight	13 May
Bronze	Nazlıcan Özerler	Judo	Women's lightweight	13 May
Bronze	Recep Çiftçi	Judo	Para men's half lightweight	13 May
Bronze	Zeynep Çelik	Judo	Para women's lightweight	13 May
Bronze	Batuhan Efemgil; Ali Erdoğan; İlker Güldüren; Bekir Özlü; Sinan Sandal; Hasan Vanlıoğlu; Feyyaz Yazıcı	Judo	Men's team	15 May
Bronze	Ömer Kemaloğlu	Karate	Men's kumite 67 kg	14 May
Bronze	Erman Eltemur	Karate	Men's kumite 75 kg	14 May
Bronze	Merve Çoban	Karate	Women's kumite 61 kg	14 May
Bronze	Özgür Varlık	Shooting	Men's 25 m standard pistol	17 May
Bronze	İzel Aydın	Shooting	Women's skeet	17 May
Bronze	Ömer Akgün; Şeymanur Koca	Shooting	10 m air rifle team	17 May
Bronze	Salih Hafız; Nur Banu Özpak	Shooting	Skeet team	17 May
Bronze	Kemal Arda Gürdal	Swimming	Men's 100 m freestyle	17 May
Bronze	Doğa Çelik	Swimming	Men's 200 m freestyle	17 May
Bronze	Kaan Özcan	Swimming	Men's 400 m freestyle	17 May
Bronze	Ediz Yıldırımer	Swimming	Men's 800 m freestyle	17 May
Bronze	Ediz Yıldırımer	Swimming	Men's 1500 m freestyle	17 May
Bronze	İskender Başlakov	Swimming	Men's 50 m backstroke	17 May
Bronze	Ege Başer	Swimming	Men's 100 m backstroke	17 May
Bronze	Samet Alkan	Swimming	Men's 200 m butterfly	17 May
Bronze	Sezin Eligül	Swimming	Women's 100 m freestyle	17 May
Bronze	Ecem Dönmez	Swimming	Women's 1500 m freestyle	17 May
Bronze	Gizem Bozkurt	Swimming	Women's 100 m butterfly	17 May
Bronze	Gizem Bozkurt	Swimming	Women's 200 m individual medley	17 May
Bronze	İmge Roza Erdemli	Swimming	Women's 200 m butterfly	17 May
Bronze	Melek Hu; Simay Kulakceken; Özge Yılmaz	Table tennis	Women's team	22 May
Bronze	Deniz Dağdelen	Taekwondo	Men's finweight	18 May
Bronze	Serdar Yüksel	Taekwondo	Men's middleweight	18 May
Bronze	İpek Çidem	Taekwondo	Women's flyweight	18 May
Bronze	Celil Erdoğdu	Weightlifting	Men's 77 kg	15 May
Bronze	Gamze Karakol	Weightlifting	Women's 48 kg	13 May
Bronze	Nebi Uzun	Wrestling	Men's freestyle 57 kg	19 May
Bronze	Zafer Dama	Wrestling	Men's freestyle 70 kg	19 May
Bronze	Salim Ercan	Wrestling	Men's freestyle 125 kg	19 May
Bronze	Abdulsamet Günal	Wrestling	Men's Greco-Roman 66 kg	19 May
Bronze	Burhan Akbudak	Wrestling	Men's Greco-Roman 80 kg	19 May
Bronze	Süleyman Demirci	Wrestling	Men's Greco-Roman 98 kg	19 May
Bronze	Bediha Gün	Wrestling	Women's freestyle 55 kg	19 May
Bronze	Derya Bayhan	Wrestling	Women's freestyle 58 kg	19 May
Bronze	Buse Tosun	Wrestling	Women's freestyle 69 kg	19 May
Bronze	Ali Ay	Wushu	Men's 65 kg	22 May
Bronze	Savaş Bekar	Wushu	Men's 70 kg	22 May
Bronze	Turkey men's national 3x3 team	3x3 basketball	Men's team	21 May
Bronze	Turkey women's national 3x3 team	3x3 basketball	Women's team	21 May

Medals by sport
Sport	1st place, gold medalist(s)	2nd place, silver medalist(s)	3rd place, bronze medalist(s)	Total
Athletics	8	10	5	23
Boxing	0	1	1	2
Diving	1	1	1	3
Gymnastics	6	3	5	14
Handball	0	2	0	2
Judo	4	4	6	14
Karate	2	6	3	11
Shooting	4	5	4	13
Swimming	26	18	13	57
Table tennis	1	1	1	3
Taekwondo	5	3	3	11
Tennis	6	2	0	8
Volleyball	0	1	0	1
Water polo	1	0	0	1
Weightlifting	3	2	2	7
Wrestling	2	8	9	19
Wushu	1	1	2	4
3x3 basketball	0	0	2	2
Total	70	68	57	195
