= List of Azerbaijani records in swimming =

The Azerbaijani records in swimming are the fastest ever performances of swimmers from Azerbaijan, which are recognised and ratified by the Azerbaijan Swimming Federation (ASF).

All records were set in finals unless noted otherwise.

== Long Course (50 m) ==
=== Men ===
Event	Time		Name	Club	Date	Meet	Location	Ref
50 m freestyle	22.98		Dmytro Cherkasov	m. Kyev	18 May 2013	Ukraine Open Cup	Kharkiv, Ukraine	
100 m freestyle	50.45	h	Dmytro Cherkasov	Azerbaijan	12 August 2010	European Championships	Budapest, Hungary	
200 m freestyle	1:51.48	r	Suleyman Ismayilzade	Azerbaijan	9 November 2025	Islamic Solidarity Games	Riyadh, Saudi Arabia	
400 m freestyle	3:54.70		Suleyman Ismayilzade	Azerbaijan	23 March 2026	Kutaisi Open Spring Cup	Kutaisi, Georgia	
800 m freestyle	7:54.34		Maksym Shemberev	Azerbaijan	16 May 2017	Islamic Solidarity Games	Baku, Azerbaijan	
1500 m freestyle	15:07.29		Maksym Shemberev	Azerbaijan	14 May 2017	Islamic Solidarity Games	Baku, Azerbaijan	
50 m backstroke	26.29	h	Boris Kirillov	Azerbaijan	18 May 2016	European Championships	London, Great Britain	
100 m backstroke	57.23	h	Boris Kirillov	Azerbaijan	18 August 2014	European Championships	Berlin, Germany	
200 m backstroke	2:02.02		Boris Kirillov	Azerbaijan	27 April 2017	Belarusian Championships	Brest, Belarus	
50 m breaststroke	28.01	h	Dmytro Cherkasov	m. Kyev	20 May 2013	Ukraine Open Cup	Kharkiv, Ukraine	
100 m breaststroke	1:02.38	h	Dmytro Cherkasov	m. Kyev	2 February 2014	Ukraine National Cup	Dnipro, Ukraine	
200 m breaststroke	2:16.19	h	Maksym Shemberev	Azerbaijan	18 May 2016	European Championships	London, Great Britain	
50 m butterfly	24.14	h	Yevgeniy Lazuka	Azerbaijan	28 July 2013	World Championships	Barcelona, Spain	
100 m butterfly	53.86	h	Yevgeniy Lazuka	Azerbaijan	2 August 2012	Olympic Games	London, Great Britain	
200 m butterfly	1:56.21	sf	Maksym Shemberev	Azerbaijan	4 August 2018	European Championships	Glasgow, Great Britain	
200 m individual medley	2:06.72		Maksym Shemberev	Azerbaijan	5 April 2016	6th Dubai International Championships	Dubai, United Arab Emirates	
400 m individual medley	4:13.61		Maksym Shemberev	Azerbaijan	15 September 2018	World Cup	Doha, Qatar	
4×100 m freestyle relay	3:29.21		Abdurrahman Rustamov (51.89); Suleyman Ismayilzade (52.52); Ramil Valizada (51.19); Said Hamidov (53.61)	Azerbaijan	12 November 2025	Islamic Solidarity Games	Riyadh, Saudi Arabia	
4×200 m freestyle relay	7:35.77		Suleyman Ismayilzade (1:51.48); Abdurrahman Rustamov (1:54.57); Oqtay Huseynov (1:55.63); Ramil Valizada (1:54.09)	Azerbaijan	9 November 2025	Islamic Solidarity Games	Riyadh, Saudi Arabia	
4×100 m medley relay	3:48.43		Boris Kirillov (57.97); Maksym Shemberev (1:02.65); Yevgeniy Lazuka (54.95); Dorian Fazekas (52.86)	Azerbaijan	17 May 2017	Islamic Solidarity Games	Baku, Azerbaijan	

Legend: # – Record awaiting ratification by ASF; WR – World record; ER – European record; e – equalled existing record;
Records not set in finals: h – heat; sf – semifinal; r – relay 1st leg; rh – relay heat 1st leg; b – B final; † – en route to final mark; so – swim-off; tt – time trial

=== Women ===
Event	Time		Name	Club	Date	Meet	Location	Ref
50 m freestyle	26.42	h	Mariam Sheikhalizadeh	Azerbaijan	21 June 2024	European Championships	Belgrade, Serbia	
100 m freestyle	58.31	h	Fatima Alkaramova	Azerbaijan	21 August 2019	World Junior Championships	Budapest, Hungary	
200 m freestyle	2:04.02		Fatima Alkaramova	Azerbaijan	28 July 2017	European Youth Olympic Festival	Győr, Hungary	
400 m freestyle	4:23.53		Fatima Alkaramova	Azerbaijan	24 March 2018	Spring Prix of Žilina	Žilina, Slovakia	
800 m freestyle	9:03.57		Fatima Alkaramova	Azerbaijan	4 July 2018	European Junior Championships	Helsinki, Finland	
1500 m freestyle	17:49.70		Fatima Alkaramova	Azerbaijan	26 April 2017	Belarusian Championships	Brest, Belarus	
50 m backstroke	31.47		Mehri Abdurahmanli	Azerbaijan	23 March 2026	Kutaisi Open Spring Cup	Kutaisi, Georgia	
100 m backstroke	1:08.40		Vlastilina Khasyanova	-	12 December 2025	Azerbaijan Championships	Baku, Azerbaijan	
200 m backstroke	2:27.11		Vlastilina Khasyanova	Azerbaijan	20 December 2024	Estonian Championships	Tartu, Estonia	
50 m breaststroke	34.22		Anastasiya Boborikina	-	17 November 2023	Azerbaijan Championships	Baku, Azerbaijan	
100 m breaststroke	1:16.00		Anastasiya Boborikina	-	20 November 2023	Azerbaijan Championships	Baku, Azerbaijan	
200 m breaststroke	2:45.35	h	Fatima Alkaramova	Azerbaijan	21 April 2016	Belarusian Championships	Brest, Belarus	
50 m butterfly	27.12	sf	Mariam Sheikhalizadeh	Azerbaijan	9 July 2021	European Junior Championships	Rome, Italy	
100 m butterfly	1:00.95		Mariam Sheikhalizadeh	Azerbaijan	25 July 2019	European Youth Olympic Festival	Baku, Azerbaijan	
200 m butterfly	2:18.38		Alsu Bayramova	Azerbaijan	14 June 2018	Mare Nostrum	Barcelona, Spain	
200m individual medley	2:23.02		Fatima Alkaramova	Azerbaijan	2 June 2023	Grand Prix	Prague, Czech Republic	
400m individual medley	5:06.02		Fatima Alkaramova	Azerbaijan	17 April 2019	Belarusian Championships	Brest, Belarus	
4×100m freestyle relay	4:07.68		Maryam Javadova (1:00.61); Fatima Alkaramova (1:00.57); Vlastilina Khasyanova (1:03.48); Mehri Abdurahmanli (1:03.02)	Azerbaijan	12 November 2025	Islamic Solidarity Games	Riyadh, Saudi Arabia	
4×200m freestyle relay	8:58.08		Maryam Javadova (2:12.56); Vlastilina Khasyanova (2:15.15); Mehri Abdurahmanli (2:19.11); Fatima Alkaramova (2:11.26)	Azerbaijan	9 November 2025	Islamic Solidarity Games	Riyadh, Saudi Arabia	
4×100m medley relay	4:34.42		Yuliya Stisyuk (1:11.17); Fatima Alkaramova (1:17.06); Ilaha Rajiyeva (1:05.74); Alsu Bayramova (1:00.45)	Azerbaijan	17 May 2017	Islamic Solidarity Games	Baku, Azerbaijan	

Legend: # – Record awaiting ratification by ASF; WR – World record; ER – European record; e – equalled existing record;
Records not set in finals: h – heat; sf – semifinal; r – relay 1st leg; rh – relay heat 1st leg; b – B final; † – en route to final mark; so – swim-off; tt – time trial

=== Mixed relay ===
Event	Time		Name	Club	Date	Meet	Location	Ref
4×100 m freestyle relay	3:45.20		Suleyman Ismayilzade (52.60); Fatima Alkaramova (1:00.30); Maryam Javadova (1:00.36); Ramil Valizade (51.94)	Azerbaijan	20 December 2024	Estonian Championships	Tartu, Estonia	
4×100 m medley relay	4:07.93	h	Boris Kirillov (58.16); Anton Zheltyakov (1:02.95); Alsu Bayramova (1:06.50); Fatima Alkaramova (1:00.32)	Azerbaijan	5 August 2015	World Championships	Kazan, Russia	

Legend: # – Record awaiting ratification by ASF; WR – World record; ER – European record; e – equalled existing record;
Records not set in finals: h – heat; sf – semifinal; r – relay 1st leg; rh – relay heat 1st leg; b – B final; † – en route to final mark; so – swim-off; tt – time trial

== Short Course (25 m) ==
=== Men ===
Event	Time		Name	Club	Date	Meet	Location	Ref
50 m freestyle	22.91	h	Abdurrahman Rustamov	Azerbaijan	5 November 2026	Belarusian Championships	Minsk, Belarus	
100 m freestyle	48.75		Abdurrahman Rustamov	Azerbaijan	7 November 2026	Belarusian Championships	Minsk, Belarus	
200 m freestyle	1:50.15	h	Suleyman Ismayilzade	Azerbaijan	3 October 2026	World Cup	Baku, Azerbaijan	
400 m freestyle	3:48.77	h	Suleyman Ismayilzade	Azerbaijan	2 December 2025	European Championships	Lublin, Poland	
800 m freestyle	7:53.30	†	Maksym Shemberev	Azerbaijan	29 September 2018	World Cup	Eindhoven, Netherlands	
1500 m freestyle	14:43.79		Maksym Shemberev	Azerbaijan	5 October 2017	World Cup	Doha, Qatar	
50 m backstroke	25.36	h	Boris Kirillov	Azerbaijan	5 December 2014	World Championships	Doha, Qatar	
100 m backstroke	54.90	h	Boris Kirillov	Azerbaijan	6 December 2016	World Championships	Windsor, Canada	
200 m backstroke	1:58.50	h	Boris Kirillov	Azerbaijan	11 December 2016	World Championships	Windsor, Canada	
50 m breaststroke	27.30		Dmytro Cherkasov	Azerbaijan	16 December 2023	Irish Winter Chamionships	Dublin, Ireland	
100 m breaststroke	1:00.70		Dmytro Cherkasov	Azerbaijan	14 December 2023	Irish Winter Chamionships	Dublin, Ireland	
200 m breaststroke	2:09.31		Egor Maynitskiy	Azerbaijan	9 November 2026	Belarusian Championships	Minsk, Belarus	
50 m butterfly	23.65	h	Abdurrahman Rustamov	Azerbaijan	9 November 2026	Belarusian Championships	Minsk, Belarus	
100 m butterfly	53.02	h	Abdurrahman Rustamov	Azerbaijan	1 October 2026	World Cup	Baku, Azerbaijan	
200 m butterfly	1:56.15	h	Maksym Shemberev	Azerbaijan	29 September 2018	World Cup	Eindhoven, Netherlands	
100 m individual medley	56.46	h	Ivan Andrianov	Azerbaijan	6 December 2014	World Championships	Doha, Qatar	
200 m individual medley	2:01.97	h	Egor Maynitskiy	Azerbaijan	15 October 2026	World Cup	Baku, Azerbaijan	
400 m individual medley	4:06.72		Maksym Shemberev	Azerbaijan	4 October 2017	World Cup	Doha, Qatar	
4×50 m freestyle relay	1:34.28	h	Abdurrahman Rustamov (23.01); Suleyman Ismayilzade (23.66); Ramil Valizada (23.66); Oqtay Huseynov (23.95)	Azerbaijan	2 December 2025	European Championships	Lublin, Poland	
4×100 m freestyle relay	3:29.11		Rashad Alquliyev (52.68); Orkhan Aliyev (51.44); Said Hamidov (51.29); Ramal Sadigli (53.70)	Azerbaijan	20 November 2025	Strongest Athletes Cup	Minsk, Belarus	
4×200 m freestyle relay								
4×50 m medley relay	1:45.78	h	Abdurrahman Rustamov (26.79); Oqtay Huseynov (30.98); Ramil Valizada (24.72); Suleyman Ismayilzade (23.29)	Azerbaijan	7 December 2025	European Championships	Lublin, Poland	
4×100 m medley relay	3:47.66		Oqtay Huseynov (58.18); Egor Maynitskiy (1:01.85); Abdurrahman Rustamov (54.66); Said Hamidov (52.97)	Azerbaijan	8 November 2026	Belarusian Championships	Minsk, Belarus	

Legend: # – Record awaiting ratification by ASF; WR – World record; ER – European record; e – equalled existing record;
Records not set in finals: h – heat; sf – semifinal; r – relay 1st leg; rh – relay heat 1st leg; b – B final; † – en route to final mark; so – swim-off; tt – time trial

=== Women ===
Event	Time		Name	Club	Date	Meet	Location	Ref
50 m freestyle	26.06		Mariam Sheikhalizadeh	Azerbaijan	17 November 2022	Hungarian Championships	Kaposvar, Hungary	
100 m freestyle	56.87	h	Mariam Sheikhalizadeh	Azerbaijan	16 November 2022	Hungarian Championships	Kaposvar, Hungary	
200 m freestyle	2:02.95	h	Fatima Alkaramova	Azerbaijan	4 October 2017	World Cup	Doha, Qatar	
400 m freestyle	4:18.82		Fatima Alkaramova	Azerbaijan	5 October 2017	World Cup	Doha, Qatar	
800 m freestyle	8:46.13		Fatima Alkaramova	Azerbaijan	4 October 2017	World Cup	Doha, Qatar	
1500 m freestyle	17:22.09		Anastasiya Gnusina	Azerbaijan	5 November 2026	Belarusian Championships	Minsk, Belarus	
50 m backstroke	31.47	h	Maryam Javadova	Azerbaijan	22 November 2025	Strongest Athletes Cup	Minsk, Belarus	
100 m backstroke	1:06.36	r	Fatima Alkaramova	Azerbaijan	6 November 2026	Belarusian Championships	Minsk, Belarus	
200 m backstroke	2:20.68		Anastasiya Gnusina	Azerbaijan	3 October 2026	World Cup	Baku, Azerbaijan	
50 m breaststroke	33.48	h	Anastasiya Boborikina	Azerbaijan	3 October 2026	World Cup	Baku, Azerbaijan	
100 m breaststroke	1:15.32	h	Anastasiya Boborikina	Azerbaijan	2 October 2026	World Cup	Baku, Azerbaijan	
200 m breaststroke	2:40.79	h	Fatima Alkaramova	Azerbaijan	11 December 2016	World Championships	Windsor, Canada	
50 m butterfly	27.11		Mariam Sheikhalizadeh	Azerbaijan	18 November 2022	Hungarian Championships	Kaposvar, Hungary	
100 m butterfly	1:00.14		Mariam Sheikhalizadeh	Azerbaijan	19 November 2022	Hungarian Championships	Kaposvar, Hungary	
200 m butterfly	2:16.16	h	Alsu Bayramova	Azerbaijan	12 December 2018	World Championships	Hangzhou, China	
100 m individual medley	1:05.39	h	Fatima Alkaramova	Azerbaijan	1 October 2026	World Cup	Baku, Azerbaijan	
200 m individual medley	2:20.15	h	Fatima Alkaramova	Azerbaijan	20 November 2025	Strongest Athletes Cup	Minsk, Belarus	
400 m individual medley	4:55.04		Fatima Alkaramova	Azerbaijan	21 November 2025	Strongest Athletes Cup	Minsk, Belarus	
4×50 m freestyle relay	1:50.82		Maryam Javadova (27.89); Vlastilina Khasyanova (27.84); Fatima Alkaramova (27.35); Mehri Abdurahmanli (27.74)	Azerbaijan	21 November 2025	Strongest Athletes Cup	Minsk, Belarus	
4×100 m freestyle relay	4:00.55		Maryam Javadova (59.57); Fatima Alkaramova (58.12); Vlastilina Khasyanova (1:00.78); Mehri Abdurahmanli (1:02.08)	Azerbaijan	20 November 2025	Strongest Athletes Cup	Minsk, Belarus	
4×200 m freestyle relay								
4×50 m medley relay	2:04.17		Vlastilina Khasyanova (32.34); Anastasiya Boborikina (34.25); Fatima Alkaramova (30.23); Maryam Javadova (27.35)	Azerbaijan	22 November 2025	Strongest Athletes Cup	Minsk, Belarus	
4×100 m medley relay								

Legend: # – Record awaiting ratification by ASF; WR – World record; ER – European record; e – equalled existing record;
Records not set in finals: h – heat; sf – semifinal; r – relay 1st leg; rh – relay heat 1st leg; b – B final; † – en route to final mark; so – swim-off; tt – time trial
