= Yusuf Widiyanto =

Indonesian wushu practitioner

Personal information
- Nationality: Indonesian
- Born: 20 May 1994 (age 32) Semarang, Central Java, Indonesia

Sport
- Country: Indonesia
- Sport: Wushu
Medal record
Men's wushu sanda
Representing Indonesia
World Championships
Gold medal – first place	2015 Jakarta	56 kg
Asian Games
Bronze medal – third place	2018 Jakarta–Palembang	56 kg
Islamic Solidarity Games
Bronze medal – third place	2017 Baku	56 kg
SEA Games
Silver medal – second place	2019 Philippines	56 kg

Yusuf Widiyanto (born 20 May 1994) is an Indonesian wushu practitioner from Semarang, Central Java. He won gold at the 2015 World Wushu Championships and bronze at the 2018 Asian Games in Jakarta in the men's Sanda 56 kg category.
