= Zhala Piriyeva =

Azerbaijani rhythmic gymnast (born 2000)

- Full name: Zhala Azad qızı Piriyeva
- Born: 10 May 2000 (age 26) Baku, Azerbaijan
- Height: 149 cm (4 ft 11 in)

Gymnastics career
- Discipline: Rhythmic gymnastics
- Country represented: Azerbaijan
- Club: Ocaq Sport club
- Head coach: Mariana Vasileva
- Assistant coach: Valentina Ukleina
- Retired: 2017
- World ranking: 26 WC (2017 Season); 43 (2016 Season)
Medal record
Representing Azerbaijan
Rhythmic Gymnastics
Islamic Solidarity Games
Gold medal – first place	2017 Baku	Team
Gold medal – first place	2017 Baku	Ball
Silver medal – second place	2017 Baku	Ribbon
Bronze medal – third place	2017 Baku	Hoop
Junior European Championships
Silver medal – second place	2014 Baku	Hoop
Bronze medal – third place	2014 Baku	Team

Zhala Piriyeva (Azerbaijani: Jalə Azad qızı Piriyeva; born 10 May 2000) is an Azerbaijani individual rhythmic gymnast. She is the 2016 Azeri National champion and three-time (2013–2015) junior Azerbaijani national champion.

== Career ==
=== Junior ===
Piriyeva began gymnastics at 4 years old. She began appearing in international competitions in the 2012 season winning gold in all-around at an International tournament in Hungary. In 2013, Piriyeva won 3 gold medals in Valentine Cup in Estonia in hoop, ball and clubs. She competed in the junior division at the 2013 Moscow Grand Prix where she won the all-around bronze medal behind Ukraine's Eleonora Romanova, she has also competed in the 2013 World Cup series.

In 2014, Piriyeva started her season competing at the 2014 Miss Valentine in Tartu, Estonia where she won gold in hoop. She competed in events in the 2014 World Cup series in Debrecen with Team Azerbaijan taking bronze, in Lisbon where she won 2 gold medals in hoop and ribbon, In Minsk she qualified to ribbon finals finishing 5th. On June 10–16, Piriyeva competed at the 2014 European Junior Championships where team Azerbaijan won bronze, she qualified to 3 event finals and won silver medal in hoop behind Russia's Yulia Bravikova. On October 17–19, Piriyeva traveled in Tokyo for the 2014 Aeon Cup, representing team Ocaq Sports club (together with senior teammates Marina Durunda and Gulsum Shafizada) where they finished 5th in team event. She won bronze in the junior all-around behind Belarusian Mariya Trubach.

On April 3, 2015, Piriyeva competed in junior division at the Irina Deleanu International tournament winning silver in the all-around behind Russian Daria Pridannikova. On October 2–4, Piriyeva together with senior teammates Marina Durunda and Ayshan Bayramova represented Team Ocaq Sports Club at the 2015 Aeon Cup in Tokyo Japan, Piriyeva won the junior all-around bronze medal with a total of 61.716 and with Team Azerbaijan finishing 5th in the overall standings.

=== Senior ===
In 2016 Season, Piriyeva made her senior international debut at the 2016 Valentine Cup in Tartu, Estonia. Piriyeva then competed at the 2016 Grand Prix Moscow where she finished 30th in the all-around. On February 26–28, she competed at the 2016 Espoo World Cup finishing 32nd in the all-around. On March 17–20, Piriyeva then competed at the 2016 Lisboa World Cup where she finished 19th in the all-around. On April 1–3, Piriryeva competed at the 2016 Pesaro World Cup where she finished 35th in the all-around. Piriryeva then won the All-around gold medal at the 2016 Azeri National Championships ahead of three-time defending Azeri champion Marina Durunda. On June 3–5, Piriryeva finished 25th in the all-around at the 2016 Guadalajara World Cup. On June 17–19, Piriyeva debuted in her first continental competition at the 2016 European Championships where she finished in 20th place. On July 8–10, Piriyeva then finished 19th in the all-around at the 2016 Kazan World Cup with a total of 67.900 points. On July 22–24, culminating the World Cup of the season in 2016 Baku World Cup, Piriryeva finished 14th in the all-around with a total of 68.850 points. On September 9–11, Piriyeva together with teammates Marina Durunda and junior Zohra Aghamirova represented team Ocaq Sport club at the annual 2016 Aeon Cup in Tokyo, where they finished 4th in Team event and with Piriryeva finishing 9th in the all-around. On September 23–24, Piriyeva culminated her season with her competition at the 2016 Grand Prix Final in Eilat, where she finished 11th in the all-around.

In 2017 season, Piriyeva competed at the 2017 Pesaro World Cup finishing 26th in the all-around. Her next competition was at the 2017 Baku World Cup where she finished 12th in the all-around behind Anastasiya Serdyukova. Piriyeva won 4 medals including 2 golds: team and ball at the 2017 Islamic Solidarity Games. On May 19–21, Piriyeva along with teammate Marina Durunda and Zohra Aghamirova represented the individual seniors for Azerbaijan at the 2017 European Championships.

== Routine music information ==
Year	Apparatus	Music title
2016	Hoop	Heart of Courage by Two Steps from Hell
2016	Ball	Dum-Taka by Elitsa Todorova
2016	Clubs	Is It Right by Elaiza
2016	Ribbon	Spanish Salsa
