= Wushu at the 2018 Asian Games – Men's sanda 56 kg =

Men's sanda 56 kg at the 2018 Asian Games
- Venue: Jakarta International Expo
- Dates: 19–23 August 2018
- Competitors: 19 from 19 nations

Medalists
gold medal	Shen Guoshun	China
silver medal	Bùi Trường Giang	Vietnam
bronze medal	Yusuf Widiyanto	Indonesia
bronze medal	Santosh Kumar	India

The men's sanda 56 kilograms competition at the 2018 Asian Games in Jakarta, Indonesia was held from 19 August to 23 August at the JIExpo Kemayoran Hall B3.

== Schedule ==
All times are Western Indonesia Time (UTC+07:00)

Date	Time	Event
Sunday, 19 August 2018	19:00	Round of 32
Monday, 20 August 2018	19:00	Round of 16
Tuesday, 21 August 2018	19:00	Quarterfinals
Wednesday, 22 August 2018	19:00	Semifinals
Thursday, 23 August 2018	10:00	Final

== Results ==
Legend

- PD — Won by point difference

=== Final ===
Final
Shen Guoshun (CHN)	2
Bùi Trường Giang (VIE)	0

=== Top half ===
Round of 32
Kan Kai Wa (MAC)	2
Jason Goh (SGP)	0

Round of 16
Shen Guoshun (CHN)	PD
Kan Kai Wa (MAC)
Lam Man Kan (HKG)	1
Avazbek Amanbekov (KGZ)	2
Reza Sobhani (IRI)	1
Yusuf Widiyanto (INA)	2
Hong Min-jun (KOR)	2
Zahoor Ahmed (PAK)	0

Quarterfinals
Shen Guoshun (CHN)	PD
Avazbek Amanbekov (KGZ)
Yusuf Widiyanto (INA)	2
Hong Min-jun (KOR)	1

Semifinals
Shen Guoshun (CHN)	2
Yusuf Widiyanto (INA)	0

=== Bottom half ===
Round of 32
Bùi Trường Giang (VIE)	2
Sukhrab Ashimzhanov (KAZ)	0
Thu Rain Linn (MYA)	0
Santosh Kumar (IND)	2

Round of 16
Francisco Solis (PHI)	0
Bùi Trường Giang (VIE)	2
Khamla Soukaphone (LAO)	2
Padam Bahadur Thakulla (NEP)	0
Chien Hung-yi (TPE)	1
Phithak Paokrathok (THA)	2
Santosh Kumar (IND)	2
Zaid Wazea (YEM)	0

Quarterfinals
Bùi Trường Giang (VIE)	2
Khamla Soukaphone (LAO)	0
Phithak Paokrathok (THA)	1
Santosh Kumar (IND)	2

Semifinals
Bùi Trường Giang (VIE)	2
Santosh Kumar (IND)	0
