= Marina Durunda =

Ukrainian-born Azerbaijani rhythmic gymnast (born 1997)

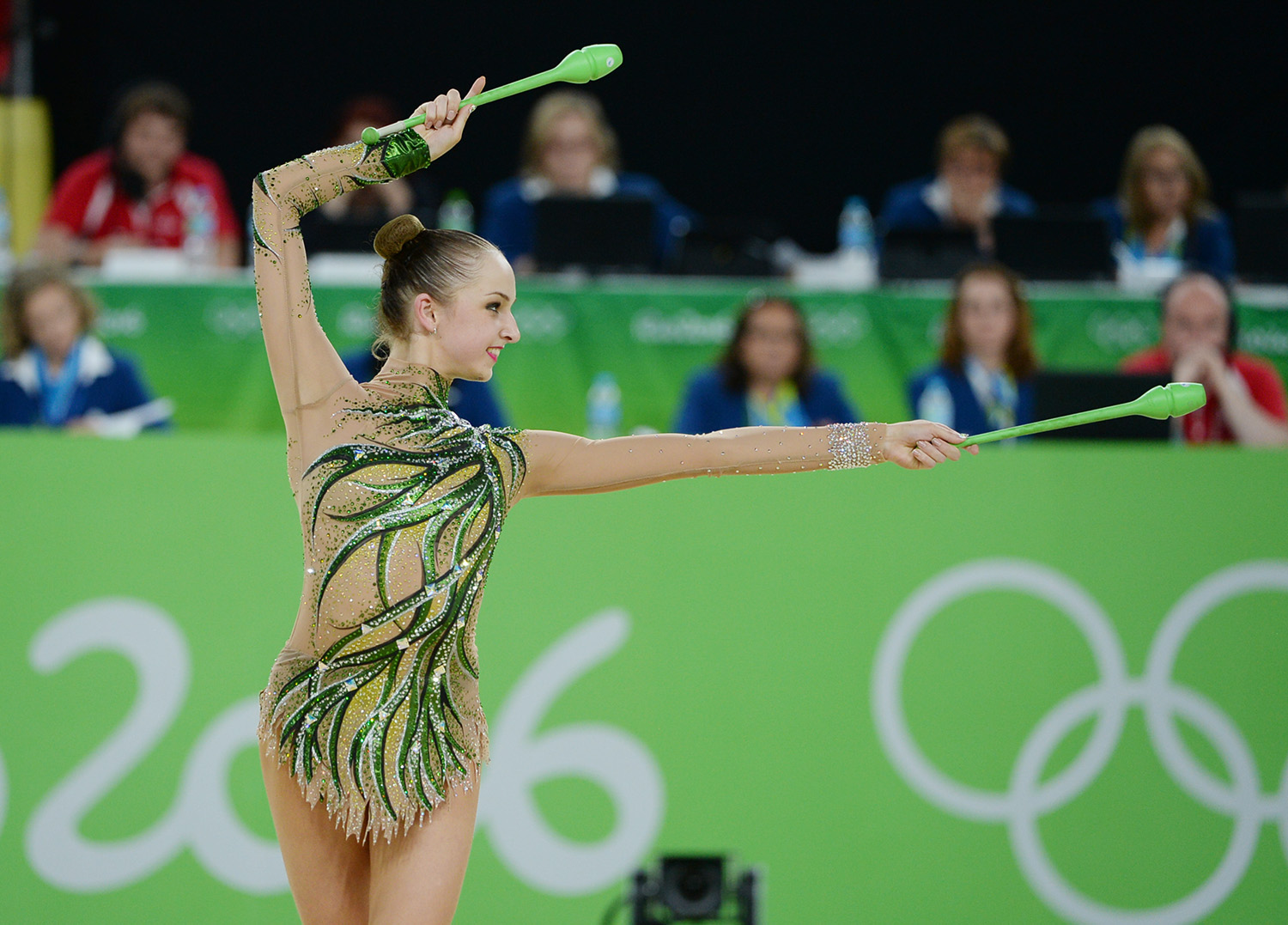
- Durunda at the 2016 Summer Olympics

Personal information
- Full name: Marina Sergeyevna Durunda
- Born: 12 June 1997 (age 29) Sevastopol, Ukraine
- Height: 170 cm (5 ft 7 in)

Gymnastics career
- Discipline: Rhythmic gymnastics
- Country represented: Azerbaijan
- Former countries represented: Cyprus; Ukraine
- Club: Ocaq sports
- Head coach: Mariana Vasileva
- Assistant coach: Anastasiya Prasolova
- Former coach: Kamil Guliyev
- Retired: 2017
- World ranking: 22 (2016 Season); 6 (2015 Season); 7 (2014 Season); 7 (2013 Season)
Medal record
Rhythmic gymnastics
Representing Azerbaijan
European Games
Silver medal – second place	2015 Baku	Ribbon
European Championships
Bronze medal – third place	2015 Minsk	Ribbon
Islamic Solidarity Games
Gold medal – first place	2017 Baku	Team
Gold medal – first place	2017 Baku	Hoop
Gold medal – first place	2017 Baku	Ribbon
Silver medal – second place	2017 Baku	Clubs
Bronze medal – third place	2017 Baku	Ball

Marina Sergeyevna Durunda (born 12 June 1997) (Azerbaijani: Marina Sergey qızı Durunda;Russian: Марина Сергеевна Дурунда) is a retired Ukrainian-born Azerbaijani individual rhythmic gymnast.

Durunda started her senior career in 2013, and soon became the leader of the Azerbaijani gymnastics and a three-time (2013-2015) national champion. She won a bronze medal at the 2015 European Championship in Minsk, and a silver medal at the inaugural 2015 European Games in Baku. Marina represented Azerbaijan at the 2016 Summer Olympics in Rio, and finished 9th in the all-around final.

== Personal life ==
She currently lives in Cyprus. She got married in 2022 and owns Marina Durunda Gymnastics Academy in Limassol.

== Career ==
=== Junior ===
Durunda began practicing rhythmic gymnastics in 2001 at age four in Sevastopol. At age six, she and her family moved to Cyprus, where for seven years until 2012 she was the national champion and won all competitions of Cyprus. Unable to receive a Cypriot passport, she accepted an invitation to compete for Azerbaijan from the Azeri National Gymnastics Team Federation.

As a junior, Durunda competed with the Azeri team at the 2012 European Championships and qualified for the ball final finishing 7th. She competed at the 2012 Aeon Cup in Japan finishing 3rd in all-around at the juniors event.

=== Senior ===
==== 2013 ====
Durunda made her senior debut at the 2013 Miss Valentine Cup in Tartu, Estonia where she won the bronze medal in all-around behind Ukrainian champion Ganna Rizatdinova and silver medalist Melitina Staniouta. She also won bronze in the ball, clubs and ribbon final. Durunda won gold in All-around at the 2013 Baltic Hoop. At the 2013 Pesaro World Cup, Durunda qualified for all four event finals, she finished 5th in ribbon. Durunda finished 6th in all-around at the 2013 Sofia World Cup and qualified for all four event finals. She again finished 6th in all-around at the 2013 Minsk World Cup. Durunda competed at her first Senior Europeans at the 2013 European Championships in Vienna, Austria. She and teammate Lala Yusifova represented Azerbaijan where they finished 4th in Team event. She qualified for three apparatus in the finals and finished 5th in ball, hoop and ribbon. She won her first senior national title at the 2013 Azerbaijan National Championships. At the 2013 World Cup Final in St.Petersburg, Russia, she finished 6th in all-around and again qualified to all 4 event finals. Durunda competed at the 2013 World Championships in Kyiv, Ukraine where she qualified and finished 5th in ribbon final. Durunda finished 16th at the 2013 World Championships All-around final behind Belarusian Katsiaryna Halkina. In October, she competed at the 2013 Grand Prix Brno finishing 6th in the all-around and qualified to four event finals. On 25–27 October Durunda competed at the World Club Championship, the 2013 Aeon Cup in Tokyo, Japan representing team Neftchi (together with teammate Lala Yusifova) finishing 5th in Team event. She finished 6th in the All-around finals behind Belarusian Katsiaryna Halkina.

==== 2014 ====
In 2014 Season, Durunda competed at the 2014 Miss Valentine Cup and won the all-around gold medal. She withdrew after suffering an injury at the 2014 Moscow Grand Prix qualifications. Durunda returned to competition in the first World Cup event of the season at the 2014 Debrecen World Cup where she finished 6th in the all-around and won gold in hoop. She finished 5th in all-around at the 2014 Stuttgart World Cup and qualified to all 4 event finals. Durunda then competed at the 2014 Holon Grand Prix where she finished 8th in all-around and qualified to 2 event finals. Durunda finished 4th in all-around at the 2014 Lisboa World Cup and won bronze in ball final. She then followed her next event at the 2014 Pesaro World Cup, where she finished 6th in all-around and qualified to 4 event finals. Durunda won her second National all-around title at the 2014 Azerbaijan Championships held in Baku. On 22–24 May Durunda competed at the 2014 Tashkent World Cup where she finished 6th in all-around behind Melitina Staniouta. She qualified to all 4 event finals and won bronze medal in ribbon and clubs (tied with Elizaveta Nazarenkova). She then competed at the 2014 Minsk World Cup finishing 7th in all-around, she qualified to 3 event finals and won bronze medal in hoop. On 10–15 June Durunda competed at the 2014 European Championships and finished 6th in all-around behind Margarita Mamun. On 8–10 August Durunda competed at the 2014 Sofia World Cup finishing 10th in all-around and 7th in ball finals. On 22–28 September Durunda (together with teammates Nilufar Niftaliyeva and Gulsum Shafizada) competed at the 2014 World Championships where Team Azerbaijan finished 5th. she qualified to 3 event finals, placing (6th in hoop, 7th in ball, 5th in clubs) and finished 6th in the all-around finals ahead of Melitina Staniouta of Belarus. On 17–19 October Durunda traveled in Tokyo for the 2014 Aeon Cup, representing team Ocaq club (together with teammates Gulsum Shafizada and junior Zhala Piriyeva) where they finished 5th in team event, Durunda finished 8th in the All-around finals.

==== 2015 ====
In 2015 Season, Durunda competed at the 2015 Valentine Cup and won the silver medals in all-around, ribbon, hoop, placed 3rd in clubs and 4th in ball. On 13–15 March Durunda then finished 4th at the Trophy de Barcelona in the all-around and took a bronze medal in clubs finals. On 21–22 March Duruna competed at the 2015 Thiais Grand Prix finishing 4th in the all-around behind Neta Rivkin, she qualified to 4 event finals, winning gold in clubs (tied with Ganna Rizatdinova), and 2 silver (hoop, ribbon). On 27–29 March Durunda competed at the 2015 Lisboa World Cup finishing 5th in the all-around, in the event finals, she took 2 bronze (ball, ribbon) and 4th place (hoop, clubs). Durunda then competed at the 2015 Bucharest World Cup and finished 5th in the all-around behind Korean Son Yeon-Jae. She qualified to event finals taking bronze in ribbon and placing 4th in hoop, ball, clubs. On 10–12 April Durunda placed 6th in all-around at the 2015 Pesaro World Cup and qualified to all 4 apparatus finals. Durunda then competed at the 2015 European Championships where Team Azerbaijan finished 5th, she qualified 2 event finals winning bronze in ribbon and placed 5th in clubs. Durunda finished 8th in all-around at the 2015 Grand Prix Berlin and qualified to 2 event finals. On 15–21 June Durunda competed at the inaugural 2015 European Games where she finished 6th in the all-around, she qualified to 3 apparatus finals: won the silver medal in ribbon, finished 5th in hoop and 6th in ball. In August, Durunda won the all-around silver at the 2015 Baltic Cup behind Israeli gymnast Victoria Veinberg Filanovsky. Durunda then competed at the 2015 Budapest World Cup finishing 7th in the all-around and qualified to 3 apparatus finals. In her next competition at the 2015 Sofia World Cup, Durunda finished 8th in the all-around behind Bulgarian Neviana Vladinova. She qualified to 2 apparatus finals finishing 6th in hoop and clubs. On 9–13 September Durunda competed at the 2015 World Championships in Stuttgart, she qualified to all 4 apparatus finals finishing 7th in Ball(17.600), 6th in Hoop (17.916), Clubs (17.833) and Ribbon (17.800). In the All-around finals; Durunda finished 6th with a total of 71.399 points. On 2–4 October Durunda together with teammates Ayshan Bayramova and junior Zhala Piriyeva represented Team Ocaq Sports Club at the 2015 Aeon Cup in Tokyo Japan, Durunda finished 10th in the all-around finals behind Viktoria Mazur and with Team Azerbaijan finishing 5th in the overall standings.

==== 2016 ====
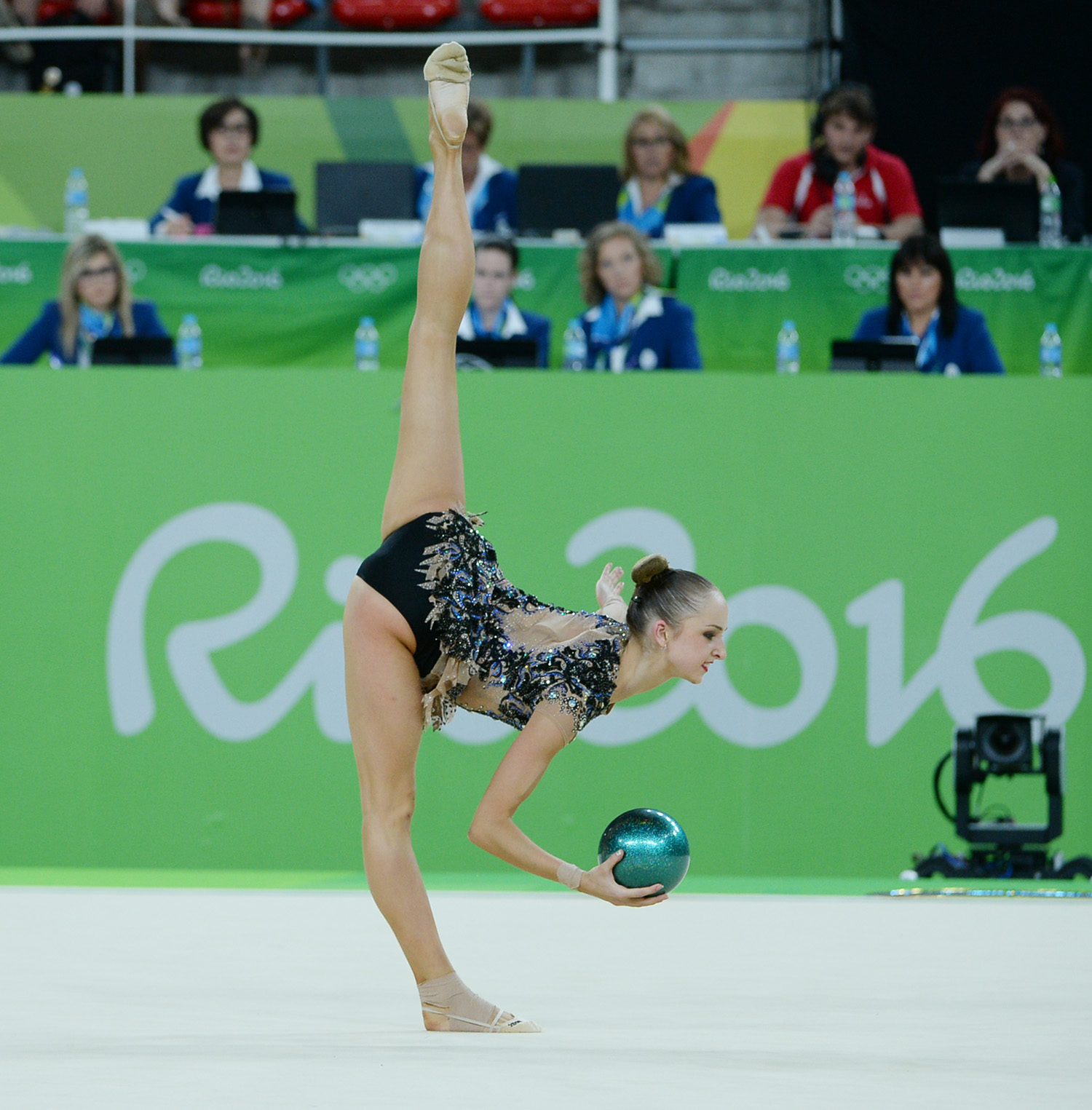
Durunda performing with ball at 2016 Summer Olympics

In 2016, recovering from a minor leg injury; Durunda first competed at the 30th Thiais Grand Prix event in Paris, where she finished 10th in the all-around and qualified 3 event finals. On 1–3 April Durunda competed at the 2016 Pesaro World Cup where she finished 18th in the all-around. On 6–8 May Durunda won the all-around silver at the Corbeil-Essonnes International Tournament; she also took silver medals in all 4 apparatus final. Durunda then finished 2nd in the All-around at the Azeri National Championships behind Zhala Piriyeva. Durunda finished 10th in the all-around at the 2016 Guadalajara World Cup and qualified to the ribbon finals. On 17–19 June Durunda competed at the 2016 European Championships where she finished in 7th place with a total of 72.116 points. On 8–10 July Durunda then finished 7th in the all-around at the 2016 Kazan World Cup with a total of 72.500 points - her highest score for the season and a New Personal Best, she also qualified to all apparatus finals placing 8th in hoop, 7th in ball, clubs and ribbon. On 22–24 July, culminating the World Cup of the season in 2016 Baku World Cup, Durunda finished 10th in the all-around with a total of 70.500, she qualified 2 event finals winning bronze in ribbon and 7th in ball. At the 2016 Summer Olympics, she reached the finals of Women's rhythmic individual all-around where she finished in 9th place with a total of 69.748 points. On 9–11 September Durunda together with teammates Zhala Piriyeva and junior Zohra Aghamirova represented team Ocaq Sport club at the annual 2016 Aeon Cup in Tokyo, where they finished 4th in Team event and with Durunda finishing 6th in the all-around.

==== 2017 ====
Durunda spent early of the season recovering from a hand injury. In May 2017, Durunda returned to competition and won five medals, including three golds at the 2017 Islamic Solidarity Games which were hosted in her home country Azerbaijan. She competed at 2017 European Championships in Budapest where she qualified to 1 apparatus final in hoop. On 6 June, just days after competing in Europeans, Durunda announced her retirement in her rhythmic gymnastics career due to the hand injury that she sustained earlier in the year.

== Routine music information ==
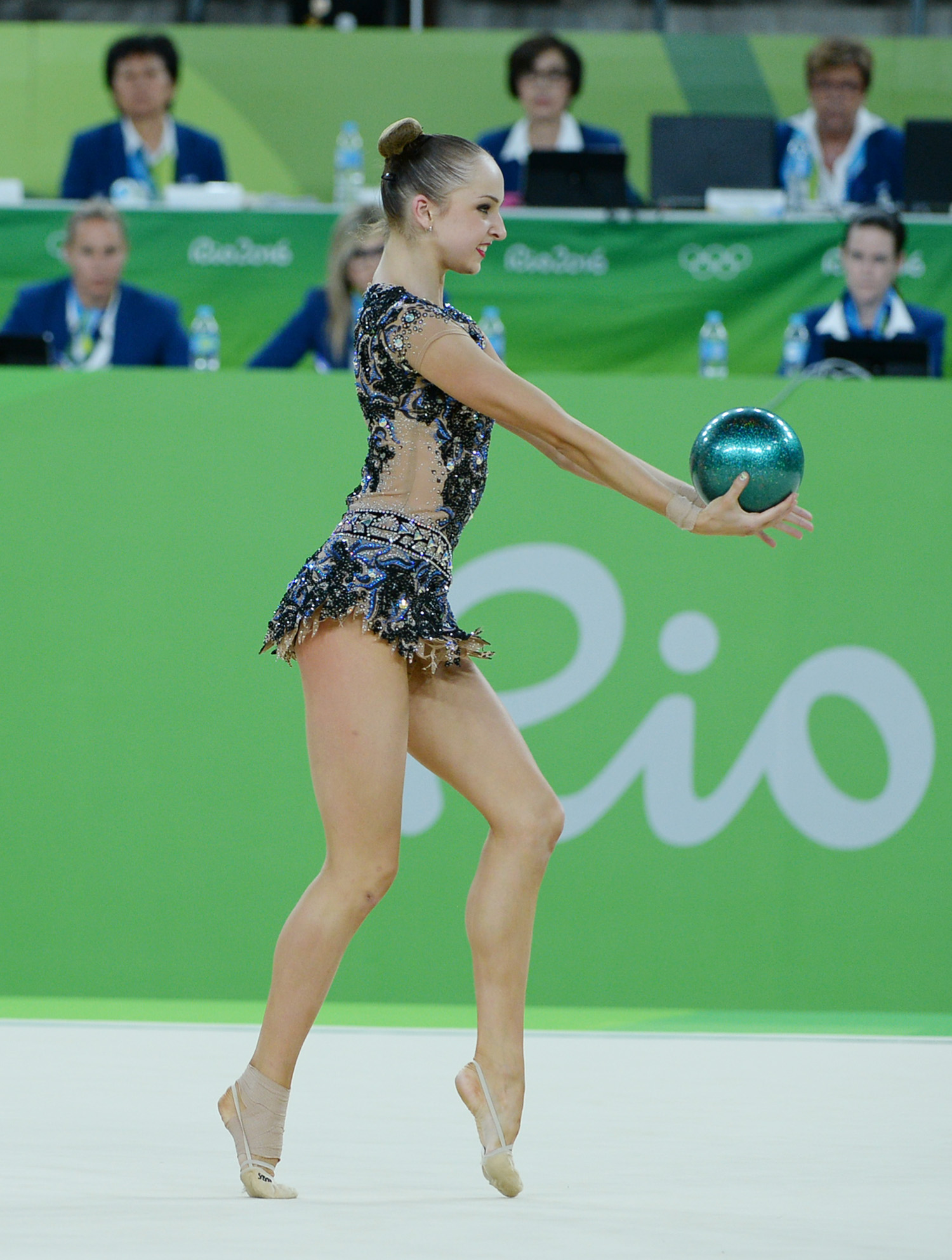
Durunda performing her ball routine at the 2016 Summer Olympics

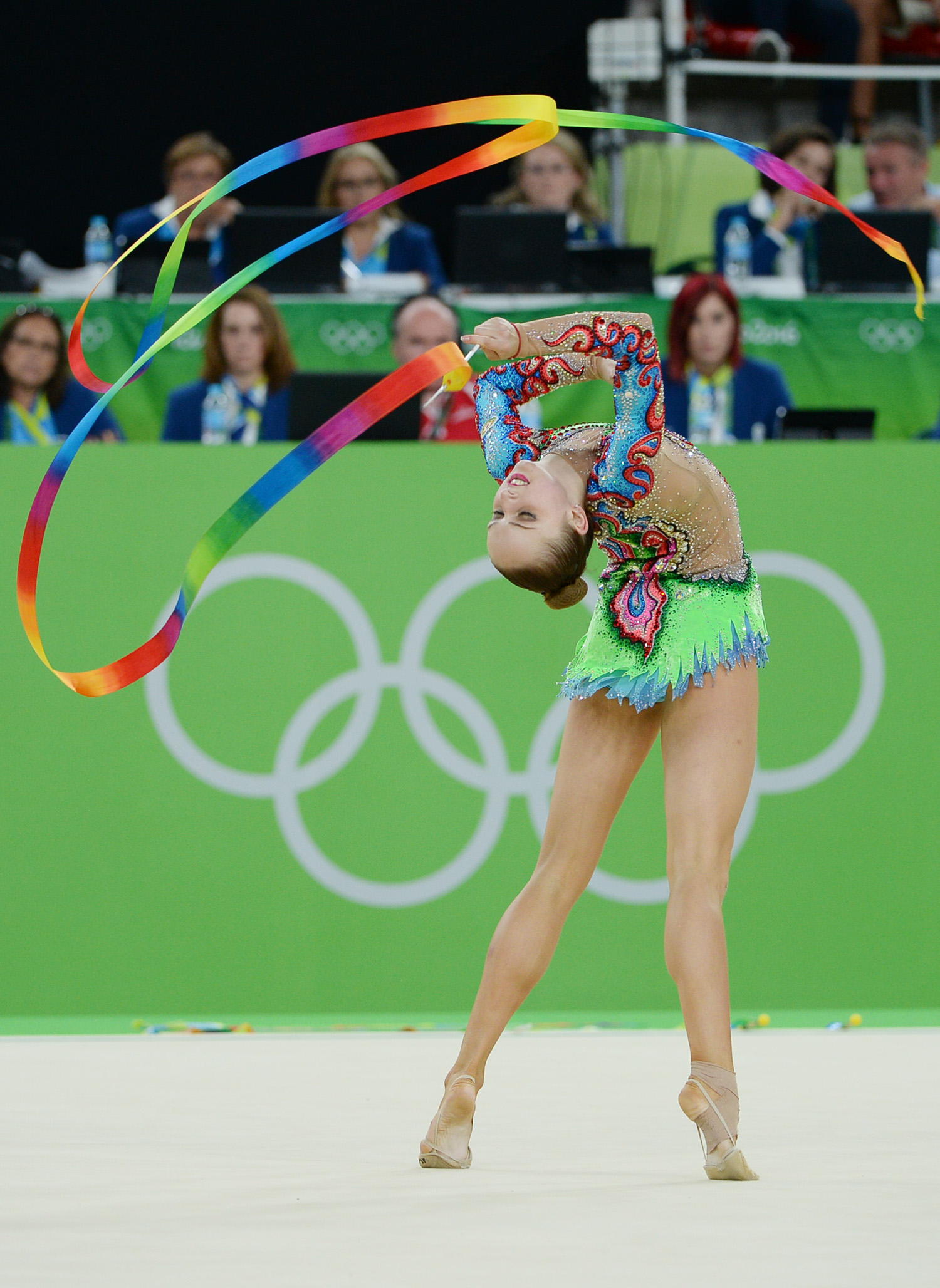
Durunda performing with ribbon at 2016 Summer Olympics

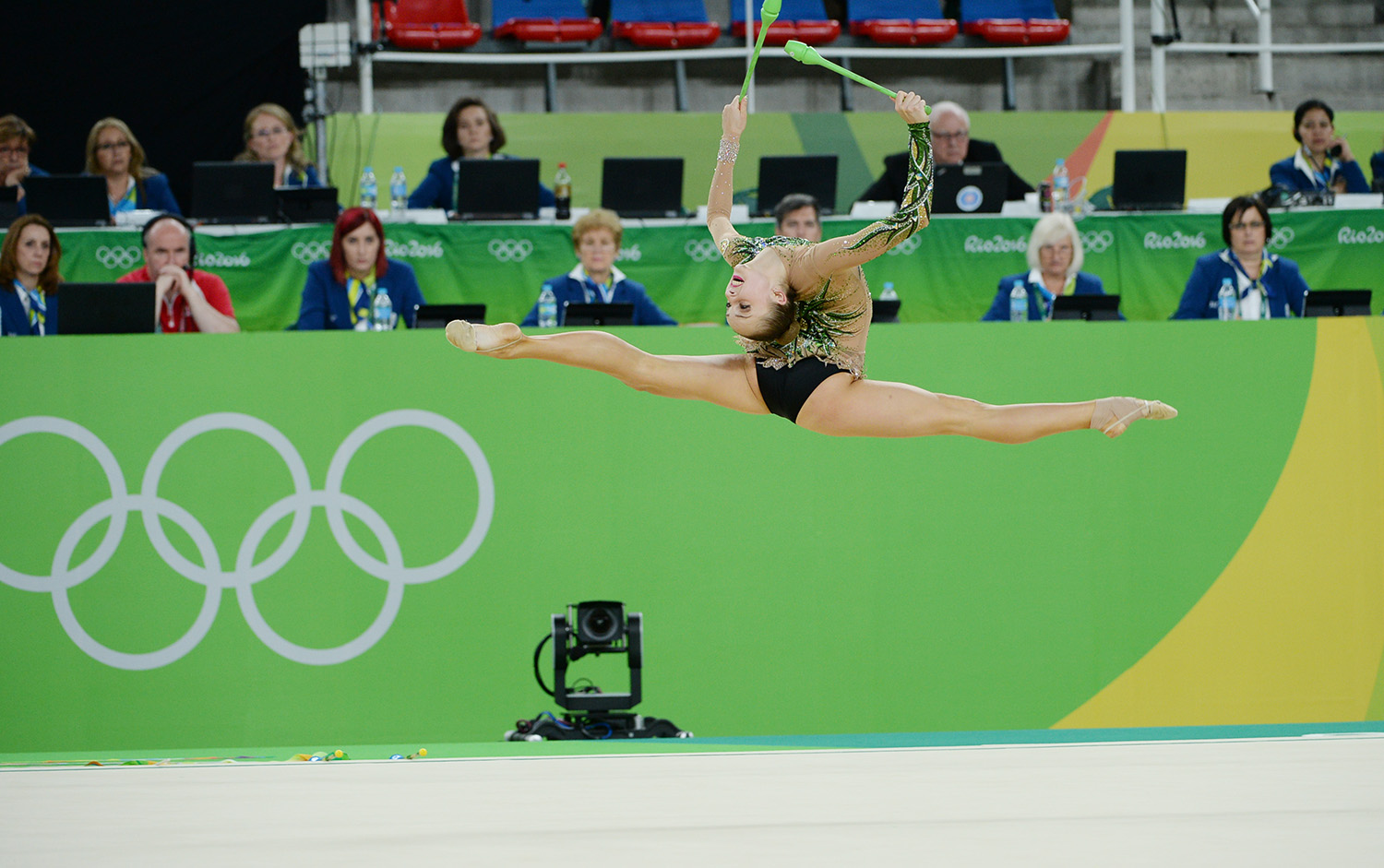
Durunda leaping during her clubs routine at 2016 Summer Olympics

Year	Apparatus	Music title
2017	Hoop	"Nas Byut, My Letaem" by Alla Pugacheva
2017	Ball	??
2017	Clubs	"To Victory (Sacrifice For Sparta Remix)" by Tyler Bates
2017	Ribbon	"Go Down Moses" by Louis Armstrong
2016	Hoop	Limanlar (Harbors-piano version) by Rashid Afandiyev Nasiboghlu
2016	Ball	Madame Papillon by René Aubry
2016	Clubs	Hey Pachico by Majas Band, Kseniya Shamarina, Ivonna Freidmane
2016	Ribbon	Never Enough (Eurovision 2012 Caspian Mix) by Emin Agalarov
2015	Hoop	Kapris 24 by Bilen Yildirir
2015	Ball	Sen Yadima Dusende by Elza Ibrahimova
2015	Clubs	Dance of Leaves by Fariborz Lachini
2015	Ribbon	Gaytaghi by Imamyar Hasanov (medley/special arrangement)
2014	Hoop	Kapris 24 by Bilen Yildirir
2014	Ball	Moonlight Sonata by Tom Barabas
2014	Clubs	Dance of Leaves by Fariborz Lachini
2014	Ribbon	Carmino by Lili Ivanova
2013	Hoop	Luna Caliente by Prandi Sound Tango Orch
2013	Ball	Mama music from Был Месяц Май by Paul Mauriat
2013	Clubs	
2013	Ribbon	I Will Never Forget You (Я тебя никогда не забуду) by Dmitriy Malikov
