= Selen Özbilen =

Turkish swimmer (born 2001)

Personal information
- Nationality: Turkish
- Born: 22 March 2001 (age 25)

Sport
- Sport: Swimming
- College team: Northwestern University
Medal record
Women's swimming
Representing Turkey
Islamic Solidarity Games
Gold medal – first place	2017 Baku	200 m freestyle
Gold medal – first place	2017 Baku	4×200 m freestyle
Silver medal – second place	2017 Baku	400 m freestyle
European Junior Championships
Bronze medal – third place	2018 Helsinki	100 m freestyle

Selen Özbilen (born 22 March 2001) is a Turkish swimmer. She represented Turkey at the 2019 World Aquatics Championships held in Gwangju, South Korea. She competed in the women's 50 metre freestyle and women's 100 metre freestyle events. In both events she did not advance to compete in the semi-finals. She also competed in two women's relay events and two mixed relay events, without winning a medal.
