= Maksym Shemberev =

Ukrainian and Azerbaijani swimmer

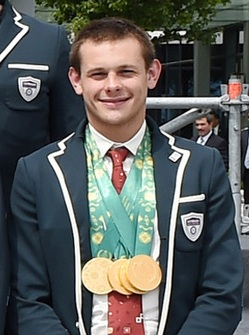

Personal information
- Nationality: Ukraine (until 2015); Azerbaijan (since 2015)
- Born: 25 September 1993 (age 32) Kyiv, Ukraine
- Height: 1.75 m (5 ft 9 in)

Sport
- Sport: Swimming
- Strokes: freestyle
Medal record
Representing Azerbaijan
Swimming
Islamic Solidarity Games
Gold medal – first place	2017 Baku	200 m butterfly
Gold medal – first place	2017 Baku	400 m medley
Gold medal – first place	2017 Baku	800 m freestyle
Gold medal – first place	2017 Baku	1500 m freestyle
Representing Ukraine
World Junior Championships
Gold medal – first place	2011 Lima	400 m medley
Bronze medal – third place	2011 Lima	200 m breaststroke
Bronze medal – third place	2011 Lima	200 m medley
European Junior Championships
Gold medal – first place	2010 Helsinki	400 m medley
Gold medal – first place	2011 Belgrade	400 m medley
Bronze medal – third place	2011 Belgrade	200 m breaststroke
European Youth Olympic Festival
Bronze medal – third place	2009 Tampere	400 m medley

Maksym Shemberev (born 25 September 1993) is a Ukrainian (until 2015) and Azerbaijani (since 2015) swimmer.

== Career ==
Maksym Shemberev was born and raised in Ukraine. He competes in the Men's individual medley and represented Ukraine until 2015. Shemberev represented Ukraine at 2012 Summer Olympics in London. He finished 15th overall in the Men's 400 metre individual medley heats and failed to reach the final.

In 2015, Shemberev switched to represent Azerbaijan. During the 2017 Islamic Solidarity Games in Baku, Shemberev won four gold medals in Men's 200 meter butterfly, 400 meter individual medley, 800 meter freestyle and 1500 meter freestyle categories.
