= Ekaterina Avramova (swimmer) =

Turkish swimmer (born 1991)

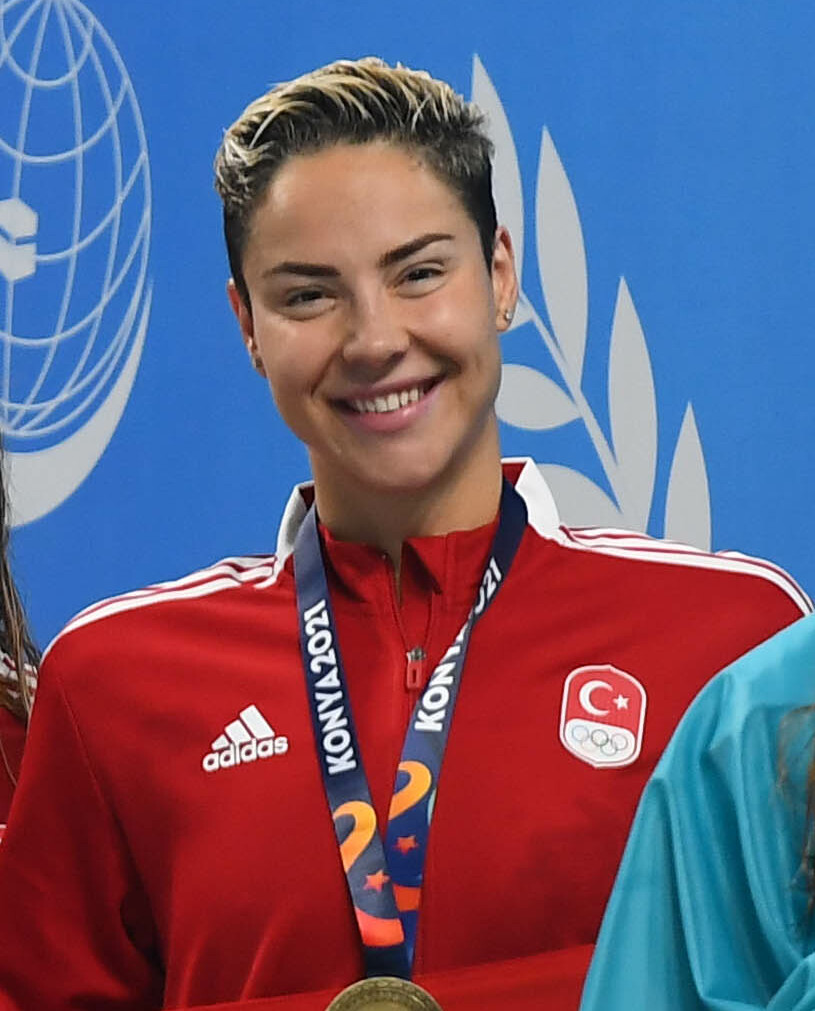

Personal information
- Full name: Ekaterina Avramova
- Nickname: Katy
- National team: Bulgaria (2007−2013); Turkey (2014–)
- Born: 12 November 1991 (age 34) Sofia, Bulgaria
- Height: 181 cm (5 ft 11 in)

Sport
- Sport: Swimming
- Strokes: Backstroke
- Club: ENKA Spor Kulübü
Medal record
Women's swimming
Representing Turkey
Islamic Solidarity Games
Gold medal – first place	2017 Baku	50 m backstroke
Gold medal – first place	2017 Baku	100 m backstroke
Gold medal – first place	2017 Baku	200 m backstroke
Gold medal – first place	2017 Baku	4×100 m freestyle
Gold medal – first place	2017 Baku	4×100 m medley
Gold medal – first place	2021 Konya	50 m backstroke
Gold medal – first place	2021 Konya	100 m backstroke
Gold medal – first place	2021 Konya	200 m backstroke
Gold medal – first place	2021 Konya	4×100 m medley
Mediterranean Games
Bronze medal – third place	2018 Tarragona	100m backstroke
Bronze medal – third place	2018 Tarragona	200m backstroke
Bronze medal – third place	2022 Oran	200 m backstroke
Bronze medal – third place	2022 Oran	4×100 m medley

Ekaterina Avramova (Bulgarian: Екатерина Аврамова; born 12 November 1991, in Sofia) is a Bulgarian-born swimmer competing for Turkey.

== Career ==
She learned how to swim at age 7 and her first coach was Jorj Stankovich. Her mother had represented Bulgaria in water polo. Avramova started her professional swimming career in 2007 representing Bulgaria at the European Short Course championship in Debrecen (Hungary). From that year until end of 2013 she represented Bulgaria in every major international competition. She broke the national backstroke records more than 70 times, both LC and SC.

In 2009, she moved from Bulgaria, to live and continue her training in London, U.K. as part of Ealing Swimming Club with Head Coach David Heathcock. Avramova qualified for the London Olympic Games in 2012 on both 100m and 200m backstroke.

After Bulgaria cut off funding for her following the 2012 Summer Olympics, she decided in August 2014 to move to Turkey accepting Turkish citizenship, and competing for Turkey.

Avramova was semi-finalist in the 2011 World Long Course Championship; Finalist in 50m,100m and 200m at the European Short Course Championship in 2011;2016 European Championships finalist in 50m and 100m backstroke and 200m back semi-finalist, 5 timed gold medalist at the Islamic Games in Baku 2017; 2 times bronze medalist at the Mediterranean Games in 2018; 2018 European Championships semi-finalist in 200m backstroke, and World Championship finalist in the 4×100 m freestyle relay. She has competed at two Olympics, competing at London 2012 for Bulgaria and at Rio 2016 for Turkey.

Ekaterina Avramova is the current Turkish and Bulgarian National Record holder in all backstroke events both long and short course. She is a member of ENKA Spor Kulubu since 2018, as prior to that she competed for Galatasaray and Fenerbahce.

As of December 2022, she is the Turkish record holder in the 100 and 200 m backstroke shortcourse, and the 50 m backstroke long course (she is also still the Bulgarian record holder in the 200 m backstroke long course), and was part of the teams that hold the national record in the women's 4 x 50 m medley relay and mixed 4 x 50 m freestyle relay (shortcourse) and mixed 4 x 100 m freestyle and 4 x 100 m medley relays (long course).
