= Göksu Üçtaş Şanlı =

Turkish artistic gymnast

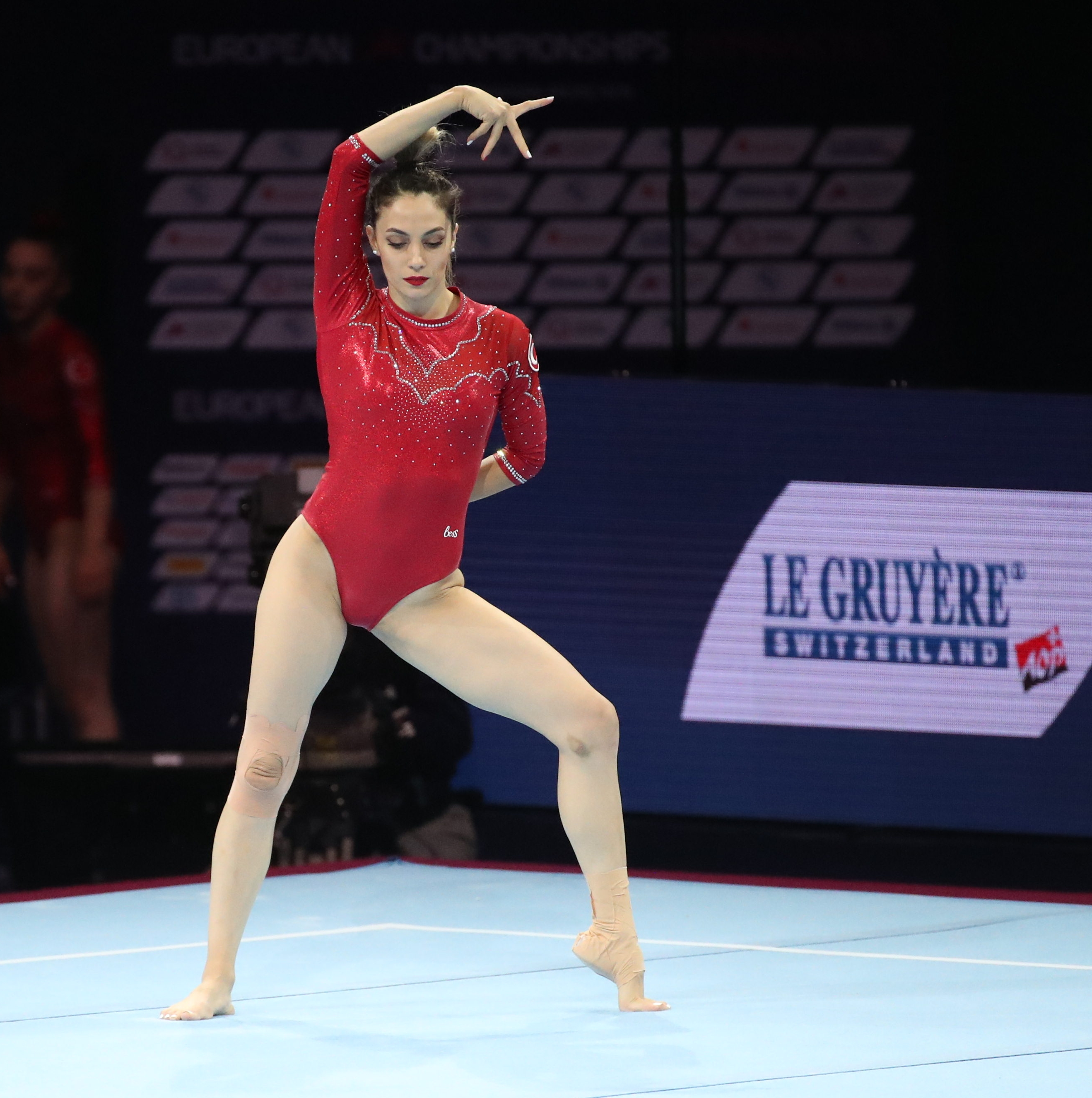
- Üçtaş Şanlı at the 2022 European Championships

Personal information
- Alternative name: Göksu Üçtaş
- Born: August 30, 1990 (age 36) Şahinbey, Gaziantep, Turkey
- Height: 158 cm (5 ft 2 in)

Gymnastics career
- Discipline: Women's artistic gymnastics
- Country represented: Turkey (2002–2012, 2016–2023)
- Head coach: Mergül Güler
- Retired: 25 April 2023
Medal record
Representing Turkey
Women's Artistic gymnastics
European Championships
Silver medal – second place	2020 Mersin	Floor Exercise
Mediterranean Games
Silver medal – second place	2009 Pescara	Vault
Silver medal – second place	2018 Tarragona	Floor Exercise
Islamic Solidarity Games
Gold medal – first place	2017 Baku	Balance Beam
Silver medal – second place	2017 Baku	Team
Silver medal – second place	2017 Baku	Floor Exercise
FIG World Cup
Event	1st	2nd	3rd
Apparatus World Cup	1	2	1
World Challenge Cup	4	0	2
Total	5	2	3

Göksu Üçtaş Şanlı (pronounced [ˈɟœcsu ˈytʃtaʃ]; born August 30, 1990, in Şahinbey, Gaziantep Province, Turkey) is a retired Turkish artistic gymnast. She was the first Turkish female artistic gymnast to compete at the Olympic Games, doing so at the 2012 Olympic Games in London.

== Personal life ==
Üçtaş was born in Şahinbey in 1990. She took up gymnastics when she was five years old. In 2008 she began studies at Bolu Abant Izzet Baysal University, studying Physical Education and Sports. Üçtaş married fellow gymnast Özgür Şanlı in 2013. They welcomed their first child, a daughter named Lina, in 2015.

== Career ==
=== 2006–2008 ===
Üçtas became age-eligible for senior competition in 2006. She competed at the 2006 World Championships. In doing so she became the first female gymnast to represent Turkey at the World Championships.

Üçtas was meant to compete at the 2008 Summer Olympics but failed to do so due to a severe neck injury which could have stopped her gymnastics career.

=== 2009–2010 ===
Üçtas competed at the 2009 Mediterranean Games held in Pescara, Italy. She placed seventh in the all-around and won silver on vault behind Youna Dufournet. She later competed at the 2009 World Championships where she placed 38th in the all-around during qualifications.

In 2010, Üçtaş won the bronze medal on floor exercise at the Doha World Cup. At the Ostrava World Cup she won gold on floor exercise and silver on vault and balance beam.

=== 2011–2012 ===
Üçtas graduated as a teacher of physical education and sports from the Abant Izzet Baysal University in Bolu Province in 2011.

Üçtaş competed at the Olympic Test Event where she qualified to compete in the 2012 Olympic Games. In doing so she became the first-ever Olympic female gymnast from Turkey. Due to an injury suffered during training prior to the Olympics, she only competed on balance beam. With a score of 11.333, Üçtaş ranked 77th on the apparatus and did not advance to the final.

=== 2013–2015 ===
In early 2013 Üçtaş announced her retirement from gymnastics due to a long-lasting injury on her left elbow. On August 14, 2013, she married gymnast Özgün Şanlı in İzmir. Üçtaş Şanlı gave birth to their daughter in 2015.

=== 2016–2017 ===
Eleven months after giving birth Üçtaş Şanlı returned to competition at the Mersin Challenge Cup. She won the gold medal on floor exercise.

At the 2017 Baku World Cup, Üçtaş Şanlı finished seventh on balance beam and fifth on floor exercise. At the Doha World Cup she finished sixth on balance beam and fifth on floor exercise. In May Üçtaş Şanlı competed at the Islamic Solidarity Games where she helped Turkey finish second as a team. Individually she placed ninth in the all-around but won gold on balance beam and silver on floor exercise.

=== 2018–2020 ===
At the Baku World Cup Üçtaş Şanlı finished eighth on vault, sixth on balance beam, and sixth on floor exercise. At the Koper Challenge Cup she finished fifth on balance beam. At the Mersin Challenge Cup she won bronze on vault and gold on balance beam and floor exercise. At the 2018 Mediterranean Games Üçtaş Şanlı won silver on floor exercise.

At the 2019 Koper Challenge Cup Üçtaş Şanlı finished sixth on balance beam and seventh on floor exercise. she next competed at the Mersin Challenge Cup where she won gold on floor exercise.

At the 2020 European Championships Üçtaş Şanlı won the silver medal on floor exercise, which was the first-ever medal for Turkey at the event.

=== 2021–2022 ===
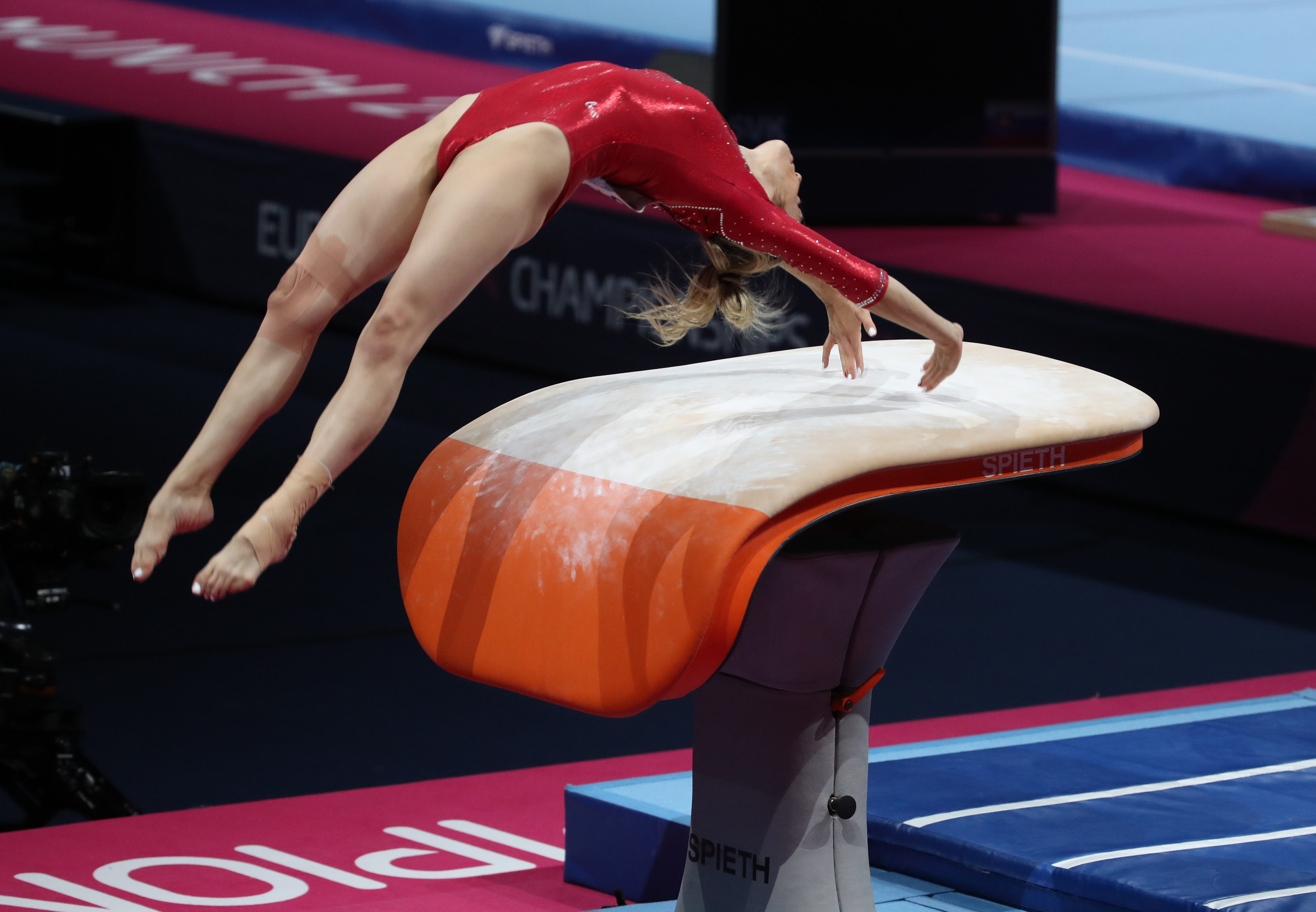
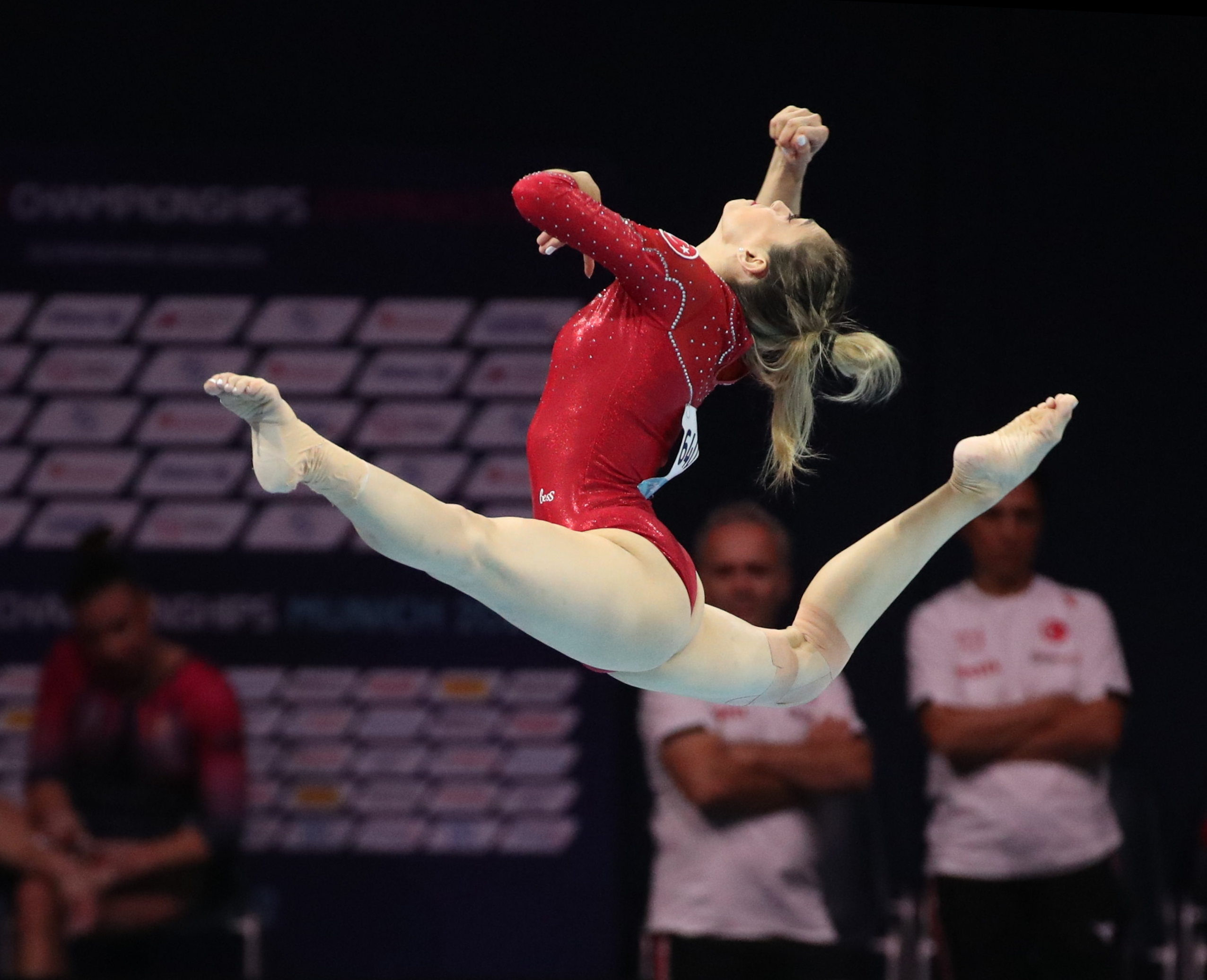
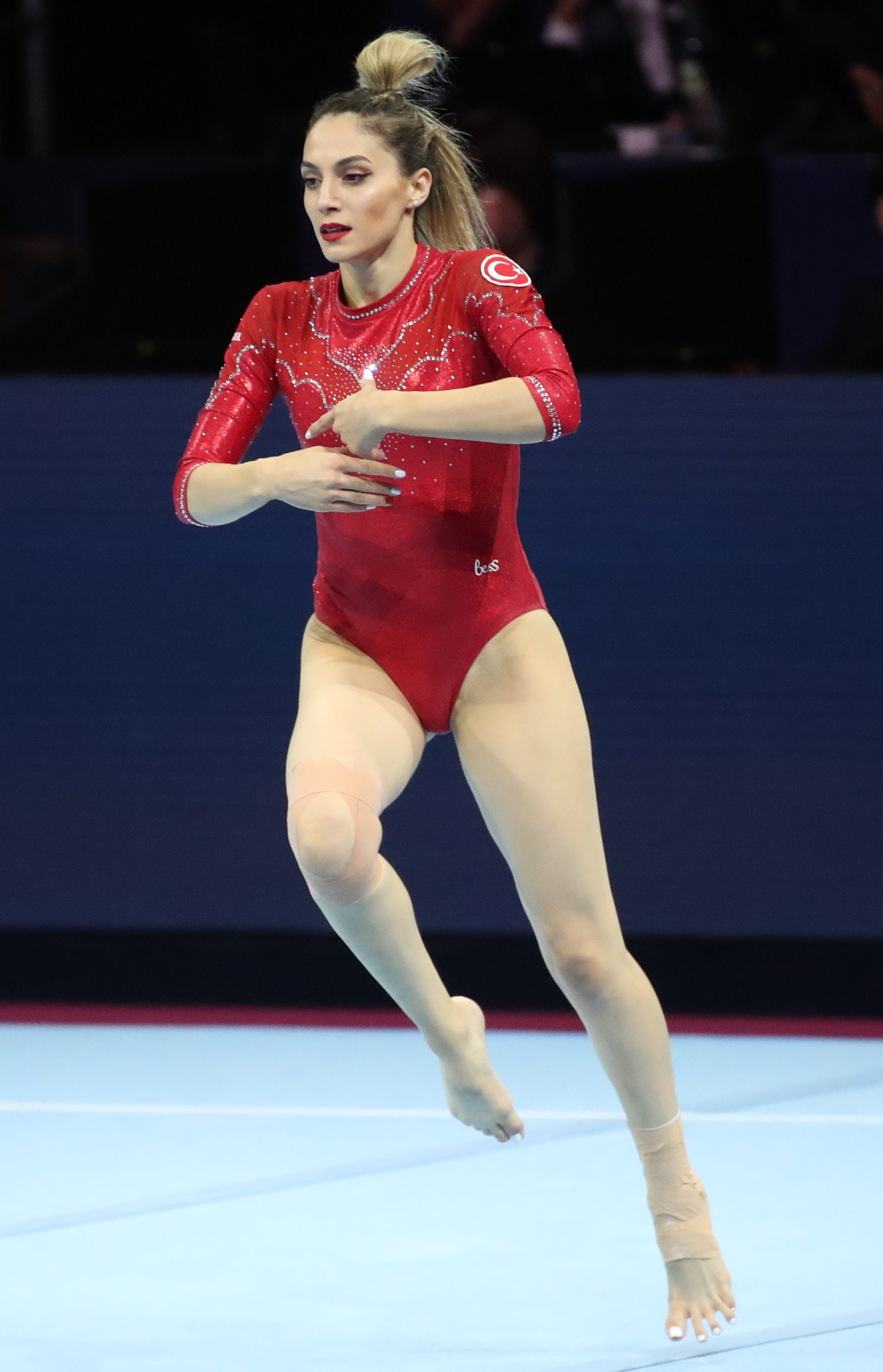
Üçtaş Şanlı at the 2022 European Championships

Üçtaş Şanlı competed at the European Championships where she placed 34th in the all-around during qualification. She competed at various World Cups before competing at the World Championships where she finished 42nd during qualifications. She competed at the Arthur Gander Memorial where she finished fifth in the three-event all-around. Üçtaş Şanlı ended the season competing at the Swiss Cup, a unique mixed-pairs event. She was partnered with Ahmet Önder; they finished fifth.

Üçtaş Şanlı competed at the 2022 Osijek Challenge Cup where she won bronze on floor exercise. She next competed at the 2022 Mediterranean Games where she helped Turkey finish fourth as a team. Individually Üçtaş Şanlı finished fourth on floor exercise. At the European Championships she helped Turkey finish 20th as a team; she did not qualify for any event finals.

=== 2023 ===
On 25 April 2023 Üçtaş Şanlı announced her retirement from the sport.

== Competitive history ==
Year	Event	Team	AA	VT	UB	BB	FX
Senior
2006
2006	World Championships		83				
2009	Mediterranean Games		7	2nd place, silver medalist(s)			
2009	World Championships		38				
2010	Doha World Cup						3rd place, bronze medalist(s)
2010	Ostrava World Cup			2nd place, silver medalist(s)		2nd place, silver medalist(s)	1st place, gold medalist(s)
2010	European Championships	21					
2010	World Championships		59				
2011
2011	World Championships		98				
2012	Olympic Test Event		53				
2012	Doha Challenge Cup						R1
2012	European Championships	22					
2012	Olympic Games					77	
2013	Hiatus						
2014	Hiatus						
2015	Hiatus						
2016	Mersin Challenge Cup						1st place, gold medalist(s)
2017	Baku World Cup					7	5
2017	Doha World Cup					6	5
2017	European Championships						
2017	Islamic Solidarity Games	2nd place, silver medalist(s)	9			1st place, gold medalist(s)	2nd place, silver medalist(s)
2018	Turkish Championships		1st place, gold medalist(s)	2nd place, silver medalist(s)	2nd place, silver medalist(s)	1st place, gold medalist(s)	1st place, gold medalist(s)
2018	Baku World Cup			8		6	6
2018	Koper Challenge Cup					5	
2018	Mediterranean Games	5	12	4			2nd place, silver medalist(s)
2018	Mersin Challenge Cup			3rd place, bronze medalist(s)		1st place, gold medalist(s)	1st place, gold medalist(s)
2018	European Championships	18					
2018	World Championships	30					
2019	Koper Challenge Cup					6	7
2019	Mersin Challenge Cup						1st place, gold medalist(s)
2019	World Championships		76				
2020
2020	European Championships	4					2nd place, silver medalist(s)
2021	Turkish Championships				8		
2021	European Championships		34				
2021	Osijek Challenge Cup						4
2021	Mersin Challenge Cup					7	7
2021	Turkish Team Championships	1st place, gold medalist(s)	1st place, gold medalist(s)	5	6	3rd place, bronze medalist(s)	1st place, gold medalist(s)
2021	World Championships		42				
2021	Arthur Gander Memorial		5				
2021	Swiss Cup	5					
2022	Osijek Challenge Cup						3rd place, bronze medalist(s)
2022	Mediterranean Games	4					4
2022	European Championships	20					
