= Gymnastics at the 2017 Islamic Solidarity Games =

Gymnastics competition

- Venue: National Gymnastics Arena
- Dates: 12–15 May 2017

Gymnastics competitions at the 2017 Islamic Solidarity Games in Baku were held from 12 to 15 May. The competition was split into two disciplines, artistic and rhythmic. Women competed in both disciplines whereas the men only took part in the artistic competition.

== Medal table ==
Rank	Nation	Gold	Silver	Bronze	Total
1	Azerbaijan (AZE)	9	7	4	20
2	Turkey (TUR)	6	3	5	14
3	Uzbekistan (UZB)	2	3	2	7
4	Algeria (ALG)	0	3	0	3
5	Iran (IRI)	0	1	2	3
6	Indonesia (INA)	0	0	3	3
7	Qatar (QAT)	0	0	1	1
Totals (7 entries)		17	17	17	51

== Medalists ==
=== Men's artistic ===
Event	Gold	Silver	Bronze
Team	Turkey; Ferhat Arıcan; Ahmet Önder; İbrahim Çolak	Azerbaijan; Bence Tálas; Murad Agharzayev; Timur Bairamov	Iran; Saeid Reza Keikha; Saman Madani; Hadi Khanarinejad
Floor	Murad Agharzayev; Azerbaijan	Ahmed Anis Maoudj; Algeria	Ahmet Önder; Turkey
Pommel horse	Bence Tálas; Azerbaijan	Saeid Reza Keikha; Iran	Ahmed Al-Dyani; Qatar
Rings	İbrahim Çolak; Turkey	Bence Tálas; Azerbaijan	Hadi Khanarinejad; Iran
Vault	Ahmet Önder; Turkey	Mohamed Bourguieg; Algeria	Muhammad Aprizal; Indonesia
Parallel bars	Ferhat Arıcan; Turkey	Hillal Metidji; Algeria	Timur Bairamov; Azerbaijan
Horizontal bar	Bence Tálas; Azerbaijan	Ferhat Arıcan; Turkey	Ahmet Önder; Turkey

=== Women's artistic ===
Event	Gold	Silver	Bronze
Team	Azerbaijan; Yulia Inshina; Marina Nekrasova; Ekaterina Tishkova	Turkey; Demet Mutlu; Ekin Morova; Göksu Üçtaş	Indonesia; Rifda Irfanaluthfi; Tazsa Miranda Devira; Armartiani
Vault	Oksana Chusovitina; Uzbekistan	Marina Nekrasova; Azerbaijan	Rifda Irfanaluthfi; Indonesia
Uneven bars	Demet Mutlu; Turkey	Ekaterina Tishkova; Azerbaijan	Ekin Morova; Turkey
Balance beam	Göksu Üçtaş; Turkey	Marina Nekrasova; Azerbaijan	Yulia Inshina; Azerbaijan
Floor	Yulia Inshina; Azerbaijan	Göksu Üçtaş; Turkey	Demet Mutlu; Turkey

=== Rhythmic ===
Event	Gold	Silver	Bronze
Team	Azerbaijan; Zhala Piriyeva; Marina Durunda; Zohra Aghamirova	Uzbekistan; Anastasiya Serdyukova; Sabina Tashkenbaeva; Nurinisso Usmanova	Turkey; Ecem Çankaya; Selen Bektaş; Başak Nida Karaevli
Hoop	Marina Durunda; Azerbaijan	Anastasiya Serdyukova; Uzbekistan	Zhala Piriyeva; Azerbaijan
Ball	Zhala Piriyeva; Azerbaijan	Anastasiya Serdyukova; Uzbekistan	Marina Durunda; Azerbaijan
Clubs	Anastasiya Serdyukova; Uzbekistan	Marina Durunda; Azerbaijan	Sabina Tashkenbaeva; Uzbekistan
Ribbon	Marina Durunda; Azerbaijan	Zhala Piriyeva; Azerbaijan	Sabina Tashkenbaeva; Uzbekistan
