= Wushu at the 2017 Islamic Solidarity Games =

- Venue: Baku Sports Hall
- Dates: 20–22 May 2017

Wushu at the 2017 Islamic Solidarity Games was held in Baku Sports Hall, Baku, Azerbaijan from 20 May to 22 May 2017. The competition included only men's sanda events.

== Medal table ==
Rank	Nation	Gold	Silver	Bronze	Total
1	Iran (IRI)	6	0	0	6
2	Turkey (TUR)	1	1	2	4
3	Azerbaijan (AZE)	0	3	3	6
4	Egypt (EGY)	0	1	0	1
4	Kyrgyzstan (KGZ)	0	1	0	1
4	Tunisia (TUN)	0	1	0	1
7	Pakistan (PAK)	0	0	3	3
8	Indonesia (INA)	0	0	2	2
8	Yemen (YEM)	0	0	2	2
10	Afghanistan (AFG)	0	0	1	1
10	Turkmenistan (TKM)	0	0	1	1
Totals (11 entries)		7	7	14	28

== Medalists ==
Event	Gold	Silver	Bronze
48 kg	Mehmet Demirci; Turkey	Turatbek Sulaimankul Uulu; Kyrgyzstan	Abdul Razaq Ayam; Afghanistan
48 kg	Mehmet Demirci; Turkey	Turatbek Sulaimankul Uulu; Kyrgyzstan	Orkhan Hatamov; Azerbaijan
52 kg	Moein Hajizadeh; Iran	Sadık Pehlivan; Turkey	Zaid Wazea; Yemen
52 kg	Moein Hajizadeh; Iran	Sadık Pehlivan; Turkey	Zahoor Ahmed; Pakistan
56 kg	Mehdi Mohammadi; Iran	Elchin Eminov; Azerbaijan	Yusuf Widiyanto; Indonesia
56 kg	Mehdi Mohammadi; Iran	Elchin Eminov; Azerbaijan	Annageldi Agamyradow; Turkmenistan
60 kg	Erfan Ahangarian; Iran	Mohamed Yassine Hamzaoui; Tunisia	Ruslan Piraliyev; Azerbaijan
60 kg	Erfan Ahangarian; Iran	Mohamed Yassine Hamzaoui; Tunisia	Helal Al-Hajj; Yemen
65 kg	Foroud Zafari; Iran	Bayram Shammadov; Azerbaijan	Ali Ay; Turkey
65 kg	Foroud Zafari; Iran	Bayram Shammadov; Azerbaijan	Ubaidullah; Pakistan
70 kg	Saeid Fazeli; Iran	Vugar Karamov; Azerbaijan	Puja Riyaya; Indonesia
70 kg	Saeid Fazeli; Iran	Vugar Karamov; Azerbaijan	Savaş Bekar; Turkey
75 kg	Yazdan Mirzaei; Iran	Ayman Galal; Egypt	Maaz Khan; Pakistan
75 kg	Yazdan Mirzaei; Iran	Ayman Galal; Egypt	Parviz Abdullayev; Azerbaijan
