= Table tennis at the 2017 Islamic Solidarity Games =

Table tennis competition

- Venue: Sarhadchi Arena
- Dates: 17–22 May

Table tennis competitions at the 2017 Islamic Solidarity Games was held from 17 May to 22 May 2017 at the Sarhadchi Arena, Baku, Azerbaijan.

== Medal table ==
Rank	Nation	Gold	Silver	Bronze	Total
1	Iran (IRI)	3	1	0	4
2	Turkey (TUR)	1	1	1	3
3	Azerbaijan (AZE)	0	2	2	4
4	Qatar (QAT)	0	0	1	1
Totals (4 entries)		4	4	4	12

== Medalists ==
Event	Gold	Silver	Bronze
Men's singles	Noshad Alamian; Iran	Nima Alamian; Iran	Li Ping; Qatar
Men's team	Iran; Amin Ahmadian; Nima Alamian; Noshad Alamian; Afshin Norouzi	Turkey; İbrahim Gündüz; Ahmet Li; Gençay Menge; Batuhan Ulucak	Azerbaijan; Vazir Allahverdiyev; Wang Chenxi; Yang Xinyu; Yu Xinhang
Women's singles	Melek Hu; Turkey	Ning Zhing; Azerbaijan	Wang Miao; Azerbaijan
Women's team	Iran; Mahshid Ashtari; Saba Safari; Maryam Samet; Neda Shahsavari	Azerbaijan; Chen Xingtai; Maryam Imanova; Ning Zhing; Wang Miao	Turkey; Melek Hu; Simay Kulakceken; Özge Yılmaz
