= Fatima Alkaramova =

Azerbaijani swimmer (born 2002)

- Fatima Alkaramova at the 2016 Summer Olympics

Personal information
- Native name: Fatimə Alkərəmova
- Born: 26 June 2002 (age 24) Baku, Azerbaijan

Sport
- Sport: Swimming
Medal record
Swimming
Representing Azerbaijan
Islamic Solidarity Games
Bronze medal – third place	2017 Baku	4 × 100 m freestyle relay
Bronze medal – third place	2017 Baku	4 × 100 m medley relay
Bronze medal – third place	2025 Riyadh	4 x 200 m freestyle relay

Fatima Alkaramova (Azerbaijani: Fatimə Alkərəmova; born 26 June 2002) is an Azerbaijani swimmer. She competed in the women's 100 metre freestyle event at the 2016 Summer Olympics, but did not advance beyond the heats. Alkaramova also won two bronze medals at the 2017 Islamic Solidarity Games in Baku and one bronze at the 2025 Islamic Solidarity Games in Riyadh.

== Personal life ==
Fatima Alkaramova was born on 26 June 2002 in Baku.

== Career ==
Alkaramova competing in the Women's 100 metre freestyle at the 2016 Summer Olympics

Alkaramova made her Olympic debut at the 2016 Summer Olympics in Rio de Janeiro, competing in the women's 100 metre freestyle, where she placed 41th overall. She also competed in the girls' 200 m freestyle event at the 2018 Summer Youth Olympics.

For International Women's Day 2020, the television channel Space TV interviewed various Azerbaijan sportswomen, including Alkaramova, about women's sports and how to inspire more to be involved.

At the 2025 Islamic Solidarity Games in Riyadh, Alkaramova as part of the Azerbaijani team, won a bronze medal in the 4 x 200m freestyle relay. Also in 2025, she swam at the Summer World University Games, where she placed 17th in 400 metre individual medley with a time of 5:06.98.

In October 2026, Alkaramova placed seventh in the 400 metre individual medley at the World Aquatics Swimming World Cup in Baku. The same year, she won bronze in the women's 200 metre individual medley at the Belarus Open, with a time of 2:18.01.

Alkaramova is the current Azerbaijani women's national record holder in the 200, 400, 800 and 1500 metre freestyle, as well as the 100, 200 and 400 metre individual medleys. She also holds the record in the 200 metre breaststroke.
