= Gülşen Samancı =

Turkish swimmer (born 2000)

Gülşen Beste Samancı
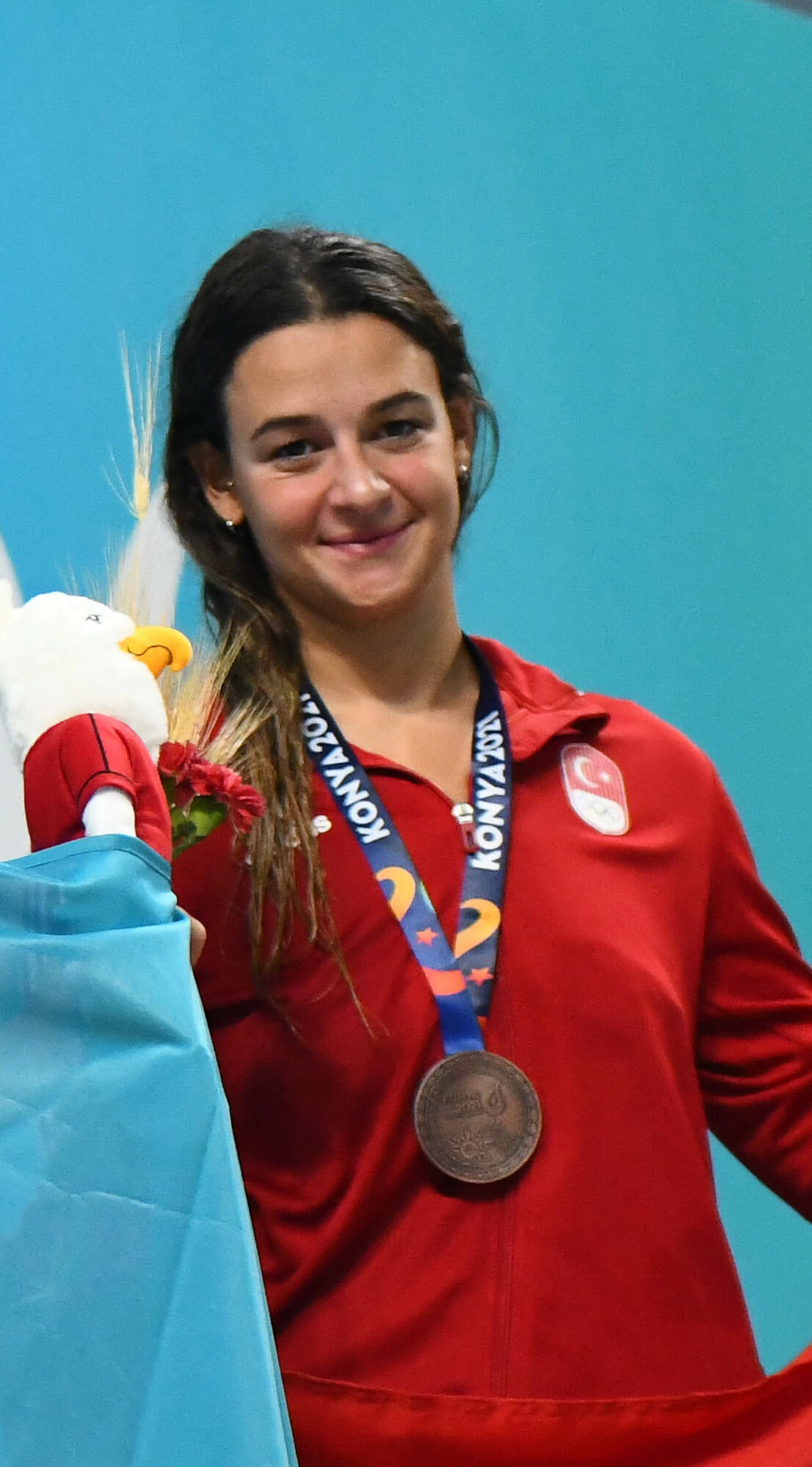

Personal information
- Nationality: Turkish
- Born: 21 February 2000 (age 26)

Sport
- Sport: Swimming
Medal record
Women's swimming
Representing Turkey
Islamic Solidarity Games
Gold medal – first place	2017 Baku	50 m breaststroke
Silver medal – second place	2017 Baku	100 m breaststroke
Bronze medal – third place	2021 Konya	50 m breaststroke

Gülşen Samancı (born 21 February 2000) is a Turkish swimmer. She competed in the women's 50 metre breaststroke at the 2019 World Aquatics Championships held in Gwangju, South Korea and she did not advance to compete in the semi-finals.
