= 3x3 basketball at the 2017 Islamic Solidarity Games =

3x3 basketball competition

- Venue: Baku Basketball Arena
- Dates: 18–21 May 2017

Basketball competitions at the 2017 Islamic Solidarity Games was held from 18 to 21 May 2017 at the Basketball Arena in Baku. The competition was taken place in the half-court 3x3 format. Each team consisted of four athletes, of whom three could appear on court at any one time.

== Medal table ==
Rank	Nation	Gold	Silver	Bronze	Total
1	Azerbaijan (AZE)	2	0	0	2
2	Mali (MLI)	0	1	0	1
2	Qatar (QAT)	0	1	0	1
4	Turkey (TUR)	0	0	2	2
Totals (4 entries)		2	2	2	6

== Medalists ==
Event	Gold	Silver	Bronze
Men	Azerbaijan; Zaur Pashayev; Amil Hamzayev; Orhan Aydın; Marshall Moses	Qatar; Nedim Muslić; Tanguy Ngombo; Abdulrahman Saad; Erfan Ali Saeed	Turkey; Türkay Barutçuoğlu; Tanalp Şengün; Recai Öztürk; Mert Başdan
Women	Azerbaijan; Alexandra Mollenhauer; Tatyana Deniskina; Dina Ulyanova; Marcedes Walker	Mali; Djénéba N'Diaye; Aminata Diakité; Rokia Coulibaly; Awa Keita	Turkey; Doğa Comba; Derin Yaya; Berrin Karabaş; Ebru Torun

== Men ==
=== Preliminary round ===
==== Group A ====
Pos	Team	Pld	W	L	PF	PA	PD	Qualification	(Azerbaijan)	(Turkmenistan)	(Turkey)	(Saudi Arabia)	(Pakistan)
1	Azerbaijan	4	4	0	77	49	+28	Quarterfinals	—	17–16	17–10	21–10	22–13
2	Turkmenistan	4	2	2	71	62	+9	Quarterfinals	16–17	—	21–13	15–20	19–12
3	Turkey	4	2	2	63	62	+1	Quarterfinals	10–17	13–21	—	21–11	19–13
4	Saudi Arabia	4	2	2	62	71	−9	Quarterfinals	10–21	20–15	11–21	—	21–14
5	Pakistan	4	0	4	52	81	−29		13–22	12–19	13–19	14–21	—

Source: Islamic Solidarity Games

==== Group B ====
Pos	Team	Pld	W	L	PF	PA	PD	Qualification	(Qatar)	(Ivory Coast)	(Mali)	(Indonesia)	(Jordan)
1	Qatar	4	4	0	77	38	+39	Quarterfinals	—	15–7	20–11	21–12	21–8
2	Ivory Coast	4	3	1	63	46	+17	Quarterfinals	7–15	—	17–13	21–7	18–11
3	Mali	4	2	2	66	51	+15	Quarterfinals	11–20	13–17	—	21–7	21–7
4	Indonesia	4	1	3	47	70	−23	Quarterfinals	12–21	7–21	7–21	—	21–7
5	Jordan	4	0	4	33	81	−48		8–21	11–18	7–21	7–21	—

Source: Islamic Solidarity Games

=== Knockout round ===
Quarterfinals
20 May
Azerbaijan	21
Indonesia	13
20 May
Ivory Coast
Turkey	WO
20 May
Qatar	15
Saudi Arabia	7
20 May
Turkmenistan	13
Mali	10

Semifinals
21 May
Azerbaijan	19
Turkey	14
21 May
Qatar	21
Turkmenistan	14

Gold medal game
21 May
Azerbaijan	13
Qatar	9
Bronze medal game
21 May
Turkey	17
Turkmenistan	10

== Women ==
=== Preliminary round ===
==== Group A ====
Pos	Team	Pld	W	L	PF	PA	PD	Qualification	(Mali)	(Azerbaijan)	(Turkmenistan)	(Algeria)
1	Mali	3	3	0	35	25	+10	Quarterfinals	—	11–8	11–8	10–9
2	Azerbaijan	3	2	1	44	32	+12	Quarterfinals	8–11	—	16–7	20–14
3	Turkmenistan	3	1	2	30	37	−7	Quarterfinals	8–11	7–16	—	15–10
4	Algeria	3	0	3	33	45	−12	Quarterfinals	9–10	14–20	10–15	—

Source: Islamic Solidarity Games

==== Group B ====
Pos	Team	Pld	W	L	PF	PA	PD	Qualification	(Turkey)	(Syria)	(Indonesia)	(Palestine)	(Pakistan)
1	Turkey	4	4	0	63	21	+42	Quarterfinals	—	11–9	10–6	21–4	21–2
2	Syria	4	3	1	65	35	+30	Quarterfinals	9–11	—	14–12	21–7	21–5
3	Indonesia	4	2	2	57	33	+24	Quarterfinals	6–10	12–14	—	18–3	21–6
4	Palestine	4	1	3	25	64	−39	Quarterfinals	4–21	7–21	3–18	—	11–4
5	Pakistan	4	0	4	17	74	−57		2–21	5–21	6–21	4–11	—

Source: Islamic Solidarity Games

=== Knockout round ===
Quarterfinals
20 May
Mali	18
Palestine	13
20 May
Syria	14
Turkmenistan (OT)	16
20 May
Turkey	12
Algeria	7
20 May
Azerbaijan	20
Indonesia	9

Semifinals
21 May
Mali	13
Turkmenistan	9
21 May
Turkey	7
Azerbaijan	17

Gold medal game
21 May
Mali	7
Azerbaijan	13
Bronze medal game
21 May
Turkmenistan	9
Turkey	13
