= Swimming at the 2017 Islamic Solidarity Games =

Swimming competition

- Venue: Baku Aquatics Centre
- Dates: 13–17 May

Swimming at the 2017 Islamic Solidarity Games was held at the Aquatic Palace, Baku, Azerbaijan from 13 to 17 May 2017.

== Medal table ==
| Rank | Nation | Gold | Silver | Bronze | Total |
|---|---|---|---|---|---|
| 1 | Turkey (TUR) | 26 | 18 | 13 | 57 |
| 2 | Algeria (ALG) | 5 | 2 | 3 | 10 |
| 3 | Azerbaijan (AZE) | 4 | 0 | 2 | 6 |
| 4 | Indonesia (INA) | 3 | 17 | 13 | 33 |
| 5 | Jordan (JOR) | 2 | 0 | 1 | 3 |
| 6 | Turkmenistan (TKM) | 0 | 2 | 0 | 2 |
| 7 | Syria (SYR) | 0 | 1 | 4 | 5 |
| 8 | Iran (IRI) | 0 | 0 | 3 | 3 |
| 9 | Kyrgyzstan (KGZ) | 0 | 0 | 1 | 1 |
| 9 | Pakistan (PAK) | 0 | 0 | 1 | 1 |
| Totals (10 entries) | | 40 | 40 | 41 | 121 |

== Medalists ==
=== Men ===
| Event | Gold | | Silver | | Bronze | |
|---|---|---|---|---|---|---|
| 50 m freestyle | Oussama Sahnoune; Algeria | 22.28 | Hüseyin Emre Sakçı; Turkey | 22.35 | Triady Fauzi Sidiq; Indonesia | 22.86 |
| 100 m freestyle | Oussama Sahnoune; Algeria | 49.15 | Doğa Çelik; Turkey | 49.98 | Kemal Arda Gürdal; Turkey | 50.19 |
| 200 m freestyle | Khader Baqlah; Jordan | 1:49.85 | Erge Can Gezmiş; Turkey | 1:50.31 | Doğa Çelik; Turkey | 1:50.44 |
| 400 m freestyle | Khader Baqlah; Jordan | 3:55.37 | Aflah Fadlan Prawira; Indonesia | 3:55.38 | Kaan Özcan; Turkey | 3:56.74 |
| 800 m freestyle | Maksym Shemberev; Azerbaijan | 7:54.34 | Aflah Fadlan Prawira; Indonesia | 8:16.00 | Ediz Yıldırımer; Turkey | 8:16.66 |
| 1500 m freestyle | Maksym Shemberev; Azerbaijan | 15:07.29 | Aflah Fadlan Prawira; Indonesia | 15:41.12 | Ediz Yıldırımer; Turkey | 16:02.76 |
| 50 m backstroke | I Gede Siman Sudartawa; Indonesia | 25.12 | Merdan Ataýew; Turkmenistan | 25.82 | İskender Başlakov; Turkey | 25.84 |
| 100 m backstroke | I Gede Siman Sudartawa; Indonesia | 55.23 | Merdan Ataýew; Turkmenistan | 55.44 | Ege Başer; Turkey | 56.08 |
| 200 m backstroke | Ege Başer; Turkey | 2:01.72 | Adbellah Ardjoune; Algeria | 2:03.63 | Ricky Anggawijaya; Indonesia | 2:03.77 |
| 50 m breaststroke | Demir Atasoy; Turkey | 27.63 | Hüseyin Emre Sakçı; Turkey | 27.73 | Indra Gunawan; Indonesia | 28.23 |
| 50 m breaststroke | Demir Atasoy; Turkey | 27.63 | Hüseyin Emre Sakçı; Turkey | 27.73 | Azad Al-Barazi; Syria | 28.23 |
| 100 m breaststroke | Demir Atasoy; Turkey | 1:01.39 | Hüseyin Emre Sakçı; Turkey | 1:01.52 | Azad Al-Barazi; Syria | 1:02.32 |
| 200 m breaststroke | Gagarin Nathaniel; Indonesia | 2:17.23 | Alpkan Örnek; Turkey | 2:17.58 | Azad Al-Barazi; Syria | 2:17.83 |
| 50 m butterfly | Berk Özkul; Turkey | 23.92 | İlker Altınbilek; Turkey | 24.26 | Mehdi Ansari; Iran | 24.32 |
| 100 m butterfly | Kaan Türker Ayar; Turkey | 52.75 | Ümit Can Güreş; Turkey | 53.02 | Triady Fauzi Sidiq; Indonesia | 53.85 |
| 200 m butterfly | Maksym Shemberev; Azerbaijan | 1:57.72 | Kaan Özcan; Turkey | 1:59.80 | Samet Alkan; Turkey | 2:00.92 |
| 200 m individual medley | Metin Aydın; Turkey | 2:02.20 | Triady Fauzi Sidiq; Indonesia | 2:02.31 | Ramzi Chouchar; Algeria | 2:06.95 |
| 400 m individual medley | Maksym Shemberev; Azerbaijan | 4:16.56 | Batuhan Hakan; Turkey | 4:24.32 | Aflah Fadlan Prawira; Indonesia | 4:24.93 |
| 4 × 100 m freestyle relay | Turkey; Doğa Çelik; İskender Başlakov; Kemal Arda Gürdal; Hüseyin Emre Sakçı | 3:23.58 | Indonesia; Raymond Sumitra Lukman; Aflah Fadlan Prawira; Ricky Anggawijaya; Triady Fauzi Sidiq | 3:27.34 | Iran; Mehdi Ansari; Benyamin Gharehhassanloo; Jamal Chavoshifar; Sina Gholampour | 3:29.75 |
| 4 × 200 m freestyle relay | Turkey; Erge Can Gezmiş; Nezir Karap; Kaan Özcan; Doğa Çelik | 7:32.32 | Indonesia; Aflah Fadlan Prawira; Putra Muhammad Randa; Ricky Anggawijaya; Triady Fauzi Sidiq | 7:38.42 | Jordan; Mohammed Bedour; Khader Baqlah; Khaled Awadallah; Mohammad Jaber | 7:54.42 |
| 4 × 100 m medley relay | Turkey; Ege Başer; Demir Atasoy; Kaan Türker Ayar; Doğa Çelik | 3:40.70 | Indonesia; I Gede Siman Sudartawa; Gagarin Nathaniel; Triady Fauzi Sidiq; Raymond Sumitra Lukman | 3:43.61 | Iran; Jamal Chavoshifar; Aria Nasimi Shad; Mehdi Ansari; Sina Gholampour | 3:48.27 |

=== Women ===
| Event | Gold | | Silver | | Bronze | |
|---|---|---|---|---|---|---|
| 50 m freestyle | İlknur Nihan Çakıcı; Turkey | 25.93 | Amel Melih; Algeria | 26.24 | Bayan Jumah; Syria | 26.45 |
| 100 m freestyle | İlknur Nihan Çakıcı; Turkey | 56.27 | Bayan Jumah; Syria | 57.04 | Sezin Eligül; Turkey | 57.07 |
| 200 m freestyle | Selen Özbilen; Turkey | 2:02.82 | Gizem Bozkurt; Turkey | 2:03.89 | Sagita Putri Krisdewanti; Indonesia | 2:04.50 |
| 400 m freestyle | Souad Cherouati; Algeria | 4:21.46 | Selen Özbilen; Turkey | 4:22.01 | Ressa Kania Dewi; Indonesia | 4:22.81 |
| 800 m freestyle | Souad Cherouati; Algeria | 8:57.90 | Ressa Kania Dewi; Indonesia | 8:59.46 | Raina Ramdhani; Indonesia | 9:01.06 |
| 1500 m freestyle | Souad Cherouati; Algeria | 17:13.55 | Raina Ramdhani; Indonesia | 17:14.58 | Ecem Dönmez; Turkey | 17:17.73 |
| 50 m backstroke | Ekaterina Avramova; Turkey | 28.51 | İlayda Kargın; Turkey | 29.19 | Amel Melih; Algeria | 29.58 |
| 100 m backstroke | Ekaterina Avramova; Turkey | 1:01.60 | Halime Zülal Zeren; Turkey | 1:03.37 | Amel Melih; Algeria | 1:04.93 |
| 200 m backstroke | Ekaterina Avramova; Turkey | 2:13.52 | Halime Zülal Zeren; Turkey | 2:16.31 | Nurul Fajar Fitriyati; Indonesia | 2:20.09 |
| 50 m breaststroke | Gülşen Beste Samancı; Turkey | 31.89 | Viktoriya Zeynep Güneş; Turkey | 32.20 | Anandia Evato; Indonesia | 32.71 |
| 100 m breaststroke | Viktoriya Zeynep Güneş; Turkey | 1:08.72 | Gülşen Beste Samancı; Turkey | 1:10.13 | Anandia Evato; Indonesia | 1:10.70 |
| 200 m breaststroke | Viktoriya Zeynep Güneş; Turkey | 2:27.25 | Anandia Evato; Indonesia | 2:34.28 | Dariya Talanova; Kyrgyzstan | 2:34.53 |
| 50 m butterfly | Aleyna Özkan; Turkey | 27.66 | Sezin Eligül; Turkey | 27.70 | Nurul Fajar Fitriyati; Indonesia | 28.25 |
| 100 m butterfly | Aleyna Özkan; Turkey | 1:01.43 | Adinda Larasati Dewi; Indonesia | 1:02.28 | Gizem Bozkurt; Turkey | 1:02.29 |
| 200 m butterfly | Nida Eliz Üstündağ; Turkey | 2:11.78 | Adinda Larasati Dewi; Indonesia | 2:14.05 | İmge Roza Erdemli; Turkey | 2:14.19 |
| 200 m individual medley | Viktoriya Zeynep Güneş; Turkey | 2:15.78 | Ressa Kania Dewi; Indonesia | 2:18.48 | Gizem Bozkurt; Turkey | 2:19.01 |
| 400 m individual medley | Viktoriya Zeynep Güneş; Turkey | 4:45.18 | Azzahra Permatahani; Indonesia | 4:51.46 | Ressa Kania Dewi; Indonesia | 4:58.62 |
| 4 × 100 m freestyle relay | Turkey; İlknur Nihan Çakıcı; Sezin Eligül; Esra Kübra Kaçmaz; Ekaterina Avramova | 3:47.77 | Indonesia; Patricia Yosita Hapsari; Nurul Fajar Fitriyati; Ressa Kania Dewi; Sagita Putri Krisdewanti | 3:52.98 | Azerbaijan; Alsu Bayramova; Yuliya Stisyuk; Ilaha Rajiyeva; Fatima Alkaramova | 4.08.37 |
| 4 × 200 m freestyle relay | Turkey; Sezin Eligül; Selen Özbilen; Esra Kübra Kaçmaz; Gizem Bozkurt | 8:16.47 | Indonesia; Raina Ramdhani; Ressa Kania Dewi; Sagita Putri Krisdewanti; Patricia Yosita Hapsari | 8:22.59 | Pakistan; Kiran Khan; Bisma Khan; Jehanara Nabi; Mishael Aisha Ayub | 10.02.14 |
| 4 × 100 m medley relay | Turkey; Ekaterina Avramova; Viktoriya Zeynep Güneş; Aleyna Özkan; İlknur Nihan Çakıcı | 4:12.78 | Indonesia; Nurul Fajar Fitriyati; Anandia Evato; Adinda Larasati Dewi; Patricia Yosita Hapsari | 4:17.52 | Azerbaijan; Yuliya Stisyuk; Fatima Alkaramova; Ilaha Rajiyeva; Alsu Bayramova | 4.34.42 |
