= List of Iranian records in Olympic weightlifting =

The following are the records of Iran in Olympic weightlifting. Records are maintained in each weight class for the snatch lift, clean and jerk lift, and the total for both lifts by the Islamic Republic of Iran Weightlifting Federation.

== Current records ==
When the previous records and weight classes were discarded, the IRIWF defined "Iran standards" as the minimum lifts needed to qualify as national records in the new weight classes.

=== Men ===
| Event | Record | Athlete | Date | Meet | Place | Ref/Note |
60 kg
| Snatch | 117 kg | Iran Standard | | | | |
| Clean & Jerk | 152 kg | Iran Standard | | | | |
| Total | 265 kg | Iran Standard | | | | |
65 kg
| Snatch | 128 kg | Iran Standard | | | | |
| Clean & Jerk | 166 kg | Hafez Ghashghaei | 9 November 2025 | Islamic Solidarity Games | Riyadh, Saudi Arabia | |
| Total | 292 kg | Hafez Ghashghaei | 9 November 2025 | Islamic Solidarity Games | Riyadh, Saudi Arabia | |
70 kg
| Snatch | 143 kg | Iran Standard | | | | |
| Clean & Jerk | 175 kg | Iran Standard | | | | |
| Total | 312 kg | Iran Standard | | | | |
75 kg
| Snatch | 152 kg | Iran Standard | | | | |
| Clean & Jerk | 187 kg | Iran Standard | | | | |
| Total | 337 kg | Iran Standard | | | | |
85 kg
| Snatch | 170 kg | Abdollah Beiranvand | 2 November 2026 | World Championships | Ningbo, China | |
| Clean & Jerk | 200 kg | Iran Standard | | | | |
| Total | 363 kg | Iran Standard | | | | |
95 kg
| Snatch | 181 kg | Ali Alipour | 4 November 2026 | World Championships | Ningbo, China | |
| Clean & Jerk | 218 kg | Ali Alipour | 28 September 2026 | Asian Games | Nagoya, Japan | |
| Total | 398 kg | Ali Alipour | 28 September 2026 | Asian Games | Nagoya, Japan | |
110 kg
| Snatch | 185 kg | Alireza Nassiri | 6 November 2026 | World Championships | Ningbo, China | |
| Clean & Jerk | 233 kg | Alireza Nassiri | 6 November 2026 | World Championships | Ningbo, China | |
| Total | 418 kg | Alireza Nassiri | 6 November 2026 | World Championships | Ningbo, China | |
+110 kg
| Snatch | 206 kg | Ali Davoudi | 29 September 2026 | Asian Games | Nagoya, Japan | |
| Clean & Jerk | 263 kg | Alireza Yousefi | 8 November 2026 | World Championships | Ningbo, China | WR |
| Total | 466 kg | Ali Davoudi | 29 September 2026 | Asian Games | Nagoya, Japan | AR |

=== Women ===
| Event | Record | Athlete | Date | Meet | Place | Ref/Note |
49 kg
| Snatch | 65 kg | Iran Standard | | | | |
| Clean & Jerk | 83 kg | Iran Standard | | | | |
| Total | 145 kg | Iran Standard | | | | |
53 kg
| Snatch | 70 kg | Iran Standard | | | | |
| Clean & Jerk | 90 kg | Iran Standard | | | | |
| Total | 158 kg | Iran Standard | | | | |
57 kg
| Snatch | 75 kg | Iran Standard | | | | |
| Clean & Jerk | 97 kg | Iran Standard | | | | |
| Total | 170 kg | Iran Standard | | | | |
61 kg
| Snatch | 94 kg | Maryam Keshtkar | 10 August 2026 | Asian Junior Championships | Tashkent, Uzbekistan | |
| Clean & Jerk | 111 kg | Maryam Keshtkar | 10 August 2026 | Asian Junior Championships | Tashkent, Uzbekistan | |
| Total | 205 kg | Maryam Keshtkar | 10 August 2026 | Asian Junior Championships | Tashkent, Uzbekistan | |
69 kg
| Snatch | 103 kg | Reihaneh Karimi | 3 November 2026 | World Championships | Ningbo, China | |
| Clean & Jerk | 133 kg | Reihaneh Karimi | 3 November 2026 | World Championships | Ningbo, China | |
| Total | 236 kg | Reihaneh Karimi | 3 November 2026 | World Championships | Ningbo, China | |
77 kg
| Snatch | 107 kg | Reihaneh Karimi | 27 September 2026 | Asian Games | Nagoya, Japan | |
| Clean & Jerk | 136 kg | Reihaneh Karimi | 27 September 2026 | Asian Games | Nagoya, Japan | |
| Total | 243 kg | Reihaneh Karimi | 27 September 2026 | Asian Games | Nagoya, Japan | |
86 kg
| Snatch | 113 kg | Mahsa Beheshti | 13 August 2026 | Asian Junior Championships | Tashkent, Uzbekistan | |
| Clean & Jerk | 148 kg | Mahsa Beheshti | 13 August 2026 | Asian Junior Championships | Tashkent, Uzbekistan | |
| Total | 261 kg | Mahsa Beheshti | 13 August 2026 | Asian Junior Championships | Tashkent, Uzbekistan | |
+86 kg
| Snatch | 106 kg | Iran Standard | | | | |
| Clean & Jerk | 130 kg | Iran Standard | | | | |
| Total | 234 kg | Iran Standard | | | | |

== Historical records ==
=== Men (2025–2026) ===
| Event | Record | Athlete | Date | Meet | Place | Ref/Note |
71 kg
| Snatch | 144 kg | Iran Standard | | | | |
| Clean & Jerk | 175 kg | Iran Standard | | | | |
| Total | 313 kg | Iran Standard | | | | |
79 kg
| Snatch | 156 kg | Abdollah Beiranvand | 6 October 2025 | World Championships | Førde, Norway | |
| Clean & Jerk | 189 kg | Iran Standard | | | | |
| Total | 341 kg | Iran Standard | | | | |
88 kg
| Snatch | 167 kg | Iran Standard | | | | |
| Clean & Jerk | 201 kg | Iran Standard | | | | |
| Total | 365 kg | Iran Standard | | | | |
94 kg
| Snatch | 182 kg | Alireza Moeini | 9 October 2025 | World Championships | Førde, Norway | WR |
| Clean & Jerk | 212 kg | Iran Standard | | | | |
| Total | 391 kg | Alireza Moeini | 9 October 2025 | World Championships | Førde, Norway | |

=== Men (2018–2025) ===
| Event | Record | Athlete | Date | Meet | Place | Ref/Note |
55 kg
| Snatch | 111 kg | Hafez Ghashghaei | 18 September 2019 | World Championships | Pattaya, Thailand | |
| Clean & Jerk | 149 kg | Hafez Ghashghaei | 18 September 2019 | World Championships | Pattaya, Thailand | |
| Total | 260 kg | Hafez Ghashghaei | 18 September 2019 | World Championships | Pattaya, Thailand | |
61 kg
| Snatch | 120 kg | Hafez Ghashghaei | 2 February 2020 | Fajr Cup | Rasht, Iran | |
| Clean & Jerk | 160 kg | Hafez Ghashghaei | 2 February 2020 | Fajr Cup | Rasht, Iran | |
| Total | 280 kg | Hafez Ghashghaei | 2 February 2020 | Fajr Cup | Rasht, Iran | |
67 kg
| Snatch | 135 kg | Hossein Pakar | 16 February 2020 | Asian Junior Championships | Tashkent, Uzbekistan | |
| Clean & Jerk | 172 kg | Hafez Ghashghaei | 12 August 2022 | Islamic Solidarity Games | Konya, Turkey | |
| Total | 299 kg | Hafez Ghashghaei | 12 August 2022 | Islamic Solidarity Games | Konya, Turkey | |
73 kg
| Snatch | 151 kg | Mirmostafa Javadi | 20 April 2021 | Asian Championships | Tashkent, Uzbekistan | |
| Clean & Jerk | 183 kg | Mirmostafa Javadi | 20 April 2021 | Asian Championships | Tashkent, Uzbekistan | |
| Total | 334 kg | Mirmostafa Javadi | 20 April 2021 | Asian Championships | Tashkent, Uzbekistan | |
81 kg
| Snatch | 163 kg | Mirmostafa Javadi | 12 December 2021 | World Championships | Tashkent, Uzbekistan | |
| Clean & Jerk | 204 kg | Mirmostafa Javadi | 12 December 2021 | World Championships | Tashkent, Uzbekistan | |
| Total | 367 kg | Mirmostafa Javadi | 12 December 2021 | World Championships | Tashkent, Uzbekistan | |
89 kg
| Snatch | 174 kg | Kianoush Rostami | 11 December 2022 | World Championships | Bogotá, Colombia | |
| Clean & Jerk | 215 kg | Mirmostafa Javadi | 11 September 2023 | World Championships | Riyadh, Saudi Arabia | |
| Total | 384 kg | Mirmostafa Javadi | 11 September 2023 | World Championships | Riyadh, Saudi Arabia | |
96 kg
| Snatch | 186 kg | Sohrab Moradi | 7 November 2018 | World Championships | Ashgabat, Turkmenistan | AR |
| Clean & Jerk | 230 kg | Sohrab Moradi | 7 November 2018 | World Championships | Ashgabat, Turkmenistan | |
| Total | 416 kg | Sohrab Moradi | 7 November 2018 | World Championships | Ashgabat, Turkmenistan | AR |
102 kg
| Snatch | 179 kg | Ali Hashemi | 8 November 2018 | World Championships | Ashgabat, Turkmenistan | |
| Clean & Jerk | 227 kg | Rasoul Motamedi | 24 April 2021 | Asian Championships | Tashkent, Uzbekistan | |
| Total | 400 kg | Rasoul Motamedi | 24 April 2021 | Asian Championships | Tashkent, Uzbekistan | |
109 kg
| Snatch | 184 kg | Ali Hashemi | 3 August 2021 | Olympic Games | Tokyo, Japan | |
| Clean & Jerk | 231 kg | Kia Ghadami | 4 March 2019 | Fajr Cup | Tehran, Iran | |
| Total | 405 kg | Ali Hashemi | 27 April 2019 | Asian Championships | Ningbo, China | |
+109 kg
| Snatch | 206 kg | Ali Davoudi | 15 December 2024 | World Championships | Manama, Bahrain | |
| Clean & Jerk | 262 kg | Alireza Yousefi | 15 December 2024 | World Championships | Manama, Bahrain | AR |
| Total | 459 kg | Ali Davoudi | 15 December 2024 | World Championships | Manama, Bahrain | |

=== Men (1998–2018) ===
| Event | Record | Athlete | Date | Meet | Place | Ref/Note |
56 kg
| Snatch | 124 kg | Majid Askari | 20 September 2014 | Asian Games | Incheon, South Korea | |
| Clean & Jerk | 150 kg | Majid Askari | 30 June 2011 | World Junior Championships | Penang, Malaysia | |
| Total | 273 kg | Majid Askari | 30 June 2011 | World Junior Championships | Penang, Malaysia | |
62 kg
| Snatch | 140 kg | Mehdi Panzvan | 17 September 2000 | Olympic Games | Sydney, Australia | |
| Clean & Jerk | 166 kg | Majid Askari | 7 September 2015 | Asian Championships | Phuket, Thailand | |
| Total | 302 kg | Mehdi Panzvan | 17 September 2000 | Olympic Games | Sydney, Australia | |
69 kg
| Snatch | 150 kg | Mehdi Panzvan | 3 October 2002 | Asian Games | Busan, South Korea | |
| Clean & Jerk | 183 kg | Jaber Behrouzi | 23 October 2013 | World Championships | Wrocław, Poland | |
| Total | 330 kg | Jaber Behrouzi | 23 October 2013 | World Championships | Wrocław, Poland | |
77 kg
| Snatch | 165 kg | Mohammad Hossein Barkhah | 22 November 2002 | World Championships | Warsaw, Poland | |
| Clean & Jerk | 208 kg | Mohammad Ali Falahatinejad | 12 September 2003 | Asian Championships | Qinhuangdao, China | |
| Total | 366 kg | Rasoul Taghian | 22 June 2013 | Asian Championships | Astana, Kazakhstan | |
85 kg
| Snatch | 179 kg | Kianoush Rostami | 12 August 2016 | Olympic Games | Rio de Janeiro, Brazil | |
| Clean & Jerk | 220 kg | Kianoush Rostami | 31 May 2016 | Fajr Cup | Tehran, Iran | WR |
| Total | 396 kg | Kianoush Rostami | 12 August 2016 | Olympic Games | Rio de Janeiro, Brazil | WR |
94 kg
| Snatch | 189 kg | Sohrab Moradi | 25 August 2018 | Asian Games | Jakarta, Indonesia | WR |
| Clean & Jerk | 233 kg | Sohrab Moradi | 3 December 2017 | World Championships | Anaheim, United States | WR |
| Total | 417 kg | Sohrab Moradi | 3 December 2017 | World Championships | Anaheim, United States | WR |
105 kg
| Snatch | 190 kg | Hossein Tavakkoli | 25 September 2000 | Olympic Games | Sydney, Australia | |
| Clean & Jerk | 235 kg | Hossein Tavakkoli | 25 September 2000 | Olympic Games | Sydney, Australia | |
| Total | 425 kg | Hossein Tavakkoli | 25 September 2000 | Olympic Games | Sydney, Australia | |
+105 kg
| Snatch | 216 kg | Behdad Salimi | 16 August 2016 | Olympic Games | Rio de Janeiro, Brazil | OR |
| Clean & Jerk | 263 kg | Hossein Rezazadeh | 25 August 2004 | Olympic Games | Athens, Greece | WR |
| Total | 472 kg | Hossein Rezazadeh | 26 September 2000 | Olympic Games | Sydney, Australia | |

=== Women (2025–2026) ===
| Event | Record | Athlete | Date | Meet | Place | Ref/Note |
48 kg
| Snatch | 64 kg | Iran Standard | | | | |
| Clean & Jerk | 82 kg | Iran Standard | | | | |
| Total | 145 kg | Zahra Pouramin | 27 October 2025 | Asian Youth Games | Sakhir, Bahrain | |
58 kg
| Snatch | 76 kg | Iran Standard | | | | |
| Clean & Jerk | 98 kg | Iran Standard | | | | |
| Total | 171 kg | Iran Standard | | | | |
63 kg
| Snatch | 82 kg | Iran Standard | | | | |
| Clean & Jerk | 105 kg | Iran Standard | | | | |
| Total | 185 kg | Iran Standard | | | | |

=== Women (2018–2025) ===
| Event | Record | Athlete | Date | Meet | Place | Ref/Note |
45 kg
| Snatch | 62 kg | Iran Standard | | | | |
| Clean & Jerk | 78 kg | Iran Standard | | | | |
| Total | 138 kg | Iran Standard | | | | |
49 kg
| Snatch | 68 kg | Iran Standard | | | | |
| Clean & Jerk | 83 kg | Anita Feizi | 30 July 2023 | Asian Youth Championships | Greater Noida, India | |
| Total | 148 kg | Iran Standard | | | | |
55 kg
| Snatch | 72 kg | Poupak Basami | 19 September 2019 | World Championships | Pattaya, Thailand | |
| Clean & Jerk | 94 kg | Poupak Basami | 12 August 2022 | Islamic Solidarity Games | Konya, Turkey | |
| Total | 165 kg | Poupak Basami | 12 August 2022 | Islamic Solidarity Games | Konya, Turkey | |
59 kg
| Snatch | 81 kg | Reihaneh Karimi | 1 August 2023 | Asian Junior Championships | Greater Noida, India | |
| Clean & Jerk | 107 kg | Reihaneh Karimi | 1 August 2023 | Asian Junior Championships | Greater Noida, India | |
| Total | 188 kg | Reihaneh Karimi | 1 August 2023 | Asian Junior Championships | Greater Noida, India | |
64 kg
| Snatch | 91 kg | Ghazaleh Hosseini | 19 December 2024 | Asian Junior Championships | Doha, Qatar | |
| Clean & Jerk | 112 kg | Reihaneh Karimi | 10 September 2023 | World Championships | Riyadh, Saudi Arabia | |
| Total | 201 kg | Reihaneh Karimi | 10 September 2023 | World Championships | Riyadh, Saudi Arabia | |
71 kg
| Snatch | 95 kg | Reihaneh Karimi | 3 May 2025 | World Junior Championships | Lima, Peru | |
| Clean & Jerk | 123 kg | Reihaneh Karimi | 7 February 2024 | Asian Championships | Tashkent, Uzbekistan | |
| Total | 217 kg | Reihaneh Karimi | 3 May 2025 | World Junior Championships | Lima, Peru | |
76 kg
| Snatch | 98 kg | Ghazaleh Hosseini | 3 May 2025 | World Junior Championships | Lima, Peru | |
| Clean & Jerk | 125 kg | Elaheh Razzaghi | 12 December 2024 | World Championships | Manama, Bahrain | |
| Total | 220 kg | Elaheh Razzaghi | 8 February 2024 | Asian Championships | Tashkent, Uzbekistan | |
81 kg
| Snatch | 106 kg | Elham Hosseini | 10 May 2023 | Asian Championships | Jinju, South Korea | |
| Clean & Jerk | 131 kg | Elham Hosseini | 10 May 2023 | Asian Championships | Jinju, South Korea | |
| Total | 237 kg | Elham Hosseini | 10 May 2023 | Asian Championships | Jinju, South Korea | |
87 kg
| Snatch | 100 kg | Yekta Jamali | 16 December 2021 | World Championships | Tashkent, Uzbekistan | |
| Clean & Jerk | 123 kg | Zeinab Sheikh-Arbab | 11 May 2023 | Asian Championships | Jinju, South Korea | |
| Total | 222 kg | Yekta Jamali | 16 December 2021 | World Championships | Tashkent, Uzbekistan | |
+87 kg
| Snatch | 103 kg | Iran Standard | | | | |
| Clean & Jerk | 131 kg | Fatemeh Yousefi | 16 October 2022 | Asian Championships | Manama, Bahrain | |
| Total | 226 kg | Iran Standard | | | | |
