= List of Japanese records in Olympic weightlifting =

The following are the records of Japan in Olympic weightlifting. Records are maintained in each weight class for the snatch lift, clean and jerk lift, and the total for both lifts by the Japan Weightlifting Association.

== Current records ==
=== Men ===
Event	Record	Athlete	Date	Meet	Place	Ref
60 kg
Snatch	132 kg	Standard				
Clean & Jerk	161 kg	Standard				
Total	290 kg	Standard				
65 kg
Snatch	141 kg	Standard				
Clean & Jerk	170 kg	Standard				
Total	308 kg	Standard				
70 kg
Snatch	154 kg	Masanori Miyamoto	26 September 2026	Asian Games	Nagoya, Japan	
Clean & Jerk	188 kg	Standard				
Total	342 kg	Masanori Miyamoto	26 September 2026	Asian Games	Nagoya, Japan	
75 kg
Snatch	155 kg	Standard				
Clean & Jerk	191 kg	Standard				
Total	343 kg	Standard				
85 kg
Snatch	160 kg	Standard				
Clean & Jerk	202 kg	Standard				
Total	359 kg	Standard				
95 kg
Snatch	173 kg	Standard				
Clean & Jerk	207 kg	Masashi Nishikawa	28 September 2026	Asian Games	Nagoya, Japan	
Total	377 kg	Masashi Nishikawa	28 September 2026	Asian Games	Nagoya, Japan	
110 kg
Snatch	182 kg	Standard				
Clean & Jerk	222 kg	Standard				
Total	401 kg	Standard				
+110 kg
Snatch	193 kg	Standard				
Clean & Jerk	235 kg	Standard				
Total	425 kg	Standard				

=== Women ===
Event	Record	Athlete	Date	Meet	Place	Ref
49 kg
Snatch	87 kg	Standard				
Clean & Jerk	110 kg	Standard				
Total	194 kg	Standard				
53 kg
Snatch	90 kg	Standard				
Clean & Jerk	116 kg	Standard				
Total	202 kg	Standard				
57 kg
Snatch	95 kg	Standard				
Clean & Jerk	122 kg	Standard				
Total	214 kg	Standard				
61 kg
Snatch	98 kg	Standard				
Clean & Jerk	127 kg	Standard				
Total	222 kg	Standard				
69 kg
Snatch	103 kg	Standard				
Clean & Jerk	133 kg	Standard				
Total	233 kg	Standard				
77 kg
Snatch	107 kg	Standard				
Clean & Jerk	135 kg	Standard				
Total	239 kg	Standard				
86 kg
Snatch	111 kg	Wakana Nagashima	29 September 2026	Asian Games	Nagoya, Japan	
Clean & Jerk	141 kg	Standard				
Total	250 kg	Standard				
+86 kg
Snatch	114 kg	Standard				
Clean & Jerk	144 kg	Standard				
Total	255 kg	Standard				

== Historical records ==
=== Men (2025–2026) ===
Event	Record	Athlete	Date	Meet	Place	Ref
60 kg
Snatch	132 kg	Standard				
Clean & Jerk	161 kg	Standard				
Total	290 kg	Standard				
65 kg
Snatch	141 kg	Tatsuma Yamashita	29 May 2026	Japanese Championships	Nagoya, Japan	
Clean & Jerk	170 kg	Standard				
Total	308 kg	Tatsuma Yamashita	29 May 2026	Japanese Championships	Nagoya, Japan	
71 kg
Snatch	152 kg	Masanori Miyamoto	5 October 2025	World Championships	Førde, Norway	
Clean & Jerk	193 kg	Masanori Miyamoto	5 October 2025	World Championships	Førde, Norway	
Total	345 kg	Masanori Miyamoto	5 October 2025	World Championships	Førde, Norway	
79 kg
Snatch	159 kg	Standard				
Clean & Jerk	194 kg	Standard				
Total	350 kg	Standard				
88 kg
Snatch	163 kg	Standard				
Clean & Jerk	205 kg	Standard				
Total	365 kg	Standard				
94 kg
Snatch	172 kg	Masashi Nishikawa	16 August 2026		Japan	
Clean & Jerk	206 kg	Standard				
Total	374 kg	Masashi Nishikawa	8 March 2026	Japanese University Championships	Ageo, Japan	
110 kg
Snatch	182 kg	Standard				
Clean & Jerk	222 kg	Standard				
Total	401 kg	Standard				
+110 kg
Snatch	193 kg	Standard				
Clean & Jerk	235 kg	Standard				
Total	425 kg	Standard				

=== Men (2018–2025) ===
Event	Record	Athlete	Date	Meet	Place	Ref
55 kg
Snatch	123 kg	Kotaro Tomari	30 April 2025	World Junior Championships	Lima, Peru	
Clean & Jerk	148 kg	Standard				
Total	266 kg	Kotaro Tomari	30 April 2025	World Junior Championships	Lima, Peru	
61 kg
Snatch	135 kg	Yoichi Itokazu	19 September 2019	World Championships	Pattaya, Thailand	
Clean & Jerk	164 kg	Yoichi Itokazu	20 April 2019	Asian Championships	Ningbo, China	
Total	298 kg	Yoichi Itokazu	20 April 2019	Asian Championships	Ningbo, China	
67 kg
Snatch	145 kg	Mitsunori Konnai	6 October 2024		Arita, Japan	
Clean & Jerk	175 kg	Mitsunori Konnai	10 December 2019	World Cup	Tianjin, China	
Total	318 kg	Mitsunori Konnai	6 October 2024		Arita, Japan	
73 kg
Snatch	158 kg	Masanori Miyamoto	4 April 2024	World Cup	Phuket, Thailand	
Clean & Jerk	193 kg	Masanori Miyamoto	25 April 2025	Japanese Championships	Fukui, Japan	
Total	350 kg	Masanori Miyamoto	4 April 2024	World Cup	Phuket, Thailand	
81 kg
Snatch	155 kg	Rakuei Azuma	23 February 2025	Japanese Junior Championships	Natori, Japan	
Clean & Jerk	195 kg	Rakuei Azuma	23 February 2025	Japanese Junior Championships	Natori, Japan	
Total	350 kg	Rakuei Azuma	23 February 2025	Japanese Junior Championships	Natori, Japan	
89 kg
Snatch	163 kg	Toshiki Yamamoto	6 November 2018	World Championships	Ashgabat, Turkmenistan	
Clean & Jerk	208 kg	Toshiki Yamamoto	23 September 2019	World Championships	Pattaya, Thailand	
Total	368 kg	Toshiki Yamamoto	23 September 2019	World Championships	Pattaya, Thailand	
96 kg
Snatch	175 kg	Masashi Nishikawa	26 April 2025	Japanese Championships	Fukui, Japan	
Clean & Jerk	206 kg	Masashi Nishikawa	26 April 2025	Japanese Championships	Fukui, Japan	
Total	381 kg	Masashi Nishikawa	26 April 2025	Japanese Championships	Fukui, Japan	
102 kg
Snatch	175 kg	Ryunosuke Mochida	30 April 2022	Japanese Championships	Niihama, Japan	
Clean & Jerk	215 kg	Toshiki Yamamoto	12 December 2020	Japanese Championships	Tsunan, Japan	
Total	385 kg	Ryunosuke Mochida	30 April 2022	Japanese Championships	Niihama, Japan	
109 kg
Snatch	182 kg	Ryunosuke Mochida	7 October 2022	National Sports Festival of Japan	Oyama, Japan	
Clean & Jerk	222 kg	Ryunosuke Mochida	13 December 2020	Japanese Championships	Tsunan, Japan	
Total	401 kg	Ryunosuke Mochida	13 December 2020	Japanese Championships	Tsunan, Japan	
+109 kg
Snatch	193 kg	Kosuke Chinen	8 October 2022	National Sports Festival of Japan	Oyama, Japan	
Clean & Jerk	235 kg	Eishiro Murakami	8 October 2022	National Sports Festival of Japan	Oyama, Japan	
Total	425 kg	Eishiro Murakami	1 May 2022	Japanese Championships	Niihama, Japan	

=== Men (1998–2018) ===
Event	Record	Athlete	Date	Meet	Place	Ref
56 kg
Snatch	117 kg	Kimihiro Tamayose	21 November 2015			
Clean & Jerk	153 kg	Masaharu Yamada	10 August 2008	Olympic Games	Beijing, China	
Total	260 kg	Masaharu Yamada	20 May 2001	East Asian Games	Osaka, Japan	
62 kg
Snatch	135 kg	Hiroshi Ikehata	17 September 2000	Olympic Games	Sydney, Australia	
Clean & Jerk	169 kg	Yoichi Itokazu	8 August 2016	Olympic Games	Rio de Janeiro, Brazil	
Total	302 kg	Yoichi Itokazu	8 August 2016	Olympic Games	Rio de Janeiro, Brazil	
69 kg
Snatch	151 kg	Masanori Miyamoto	25 May 2018	National Championships	Kanazawa, Japan	
Clean & Jerk	180 kg	Mitsunori Konnai	10 March 2018	National University Championships	Ageo, Japan	
Total	328 kg	Mitsunori Konnai	10 March 2018	National University Championships	Ageo, Japan	
77 kg
Snatch	155 kg	Masanori Miyamoto	15 December 2018	Japanese University Championships	Ageo, Japan	
Clean & Jerk	188 kg	Masanori Miyamoto	15 December 2018	Japanese University Championships	Ageo, Japan	
Total	343 kg	Masanori Miyamoto	15 December 2018	Japanese University Championships	Ageo, Japan	
85 kg
Snatch	159 kg	Tatsuyuki Kinoshita	5 October 2018	National Sports Festival	Obama, Japan	
Clean & Jerk	206 kg	Toshiki Yamamoto	26 May 2018	National Championships	Kanazawa, Japan	
Total	361 kg	Toshiki Yamamoto	26 May 2018	National Championships	Kanazawa, Japan	
94 kg
Snatch	165 kg	Toshiki Yamamoto	24 November 2018		Takahagi, Japan	
Clean & Jerk	202 kg	Toshiki Yamamoto	24 November 2018		Takahagi, Japan	
Total	367 kg	Toshiki Yamamoto	24 November 2018		Takahagi, Japan	
105 kg
Snatch	176 kg	Taro Tanaka	27 May 2018	National Championships	Kanazawa, Japan	
Clean & Jerk	220 kg	Ryunosuke Mochida	19 August 2017	National Sports Festival	Amagasaki, Japan	
Total	391 kg	Ryunosuke Mochida	6 October 2017	National Sports Festival	Niihama, Japan	
+105 kg
Snatch	188 kg	Kazuomi Ota	25 May 2014	National Championships		
Clean & Jerk	227 kg	Kazuomi Ota	14 June 2015	National Championships		
Total	412 kg	Kazuomi Ota	25 May 2014	National Championships		

=== Women (2025–2026) ===
Event	Record	Athlete	Date	Meet	Place	Ref
48 kg
Snatch	86 kg	Standard				
Clean & Jerk	109 kg	Standard				
Total	192 kg	Standard				
53 kg
Snatch	90 kg	Nozomi Abe	12 December 2025		Yamanashi, Japan	
Clean & Jerk	116 kg	Standard				
Total	202 kg	Standard				
58 kg
Snatch	97 kg	Standard				
Clean & Jerk	125 kg	Standard				
Total	219 kg	Standard				
63 kg
Snatch	100 kg	Standard				
Clean & Jerk	130 kg	Standard				
Total	227 kg	Standard				
69 kg
Snatch	103 kg	Standard				
Clean & Jerk	133 kg	Standard				
Total	233 kg	Standard				
77 kg
Snatch	107 kg	Standard				
Clean & Jerk	135 kg	Standard				
Total	239 kg	Standard				
86 kg
Snatch	110 kg	Standard				
Clean & Jerk	141 kg	Wakana Nagashima	3 July 2026		Japan	
Total	250 kg	Wakana Nagashima	3 July 2026		Japan	
+86 kg
Snatch	114 kg	Standard				
Clean & Jerk	144 kg	Standard				
Total	255 kg	Standard				

=== Women (2018–2025) ===
Event	Record	Athlete	Date	Meet	Place	Ref
45 kg
Snatch	78 kg	Standard				
Clean & Jerk	100 kg	Standard				
Total	176 kg	Standard				
49 kg
Snatch	86 kg	Rira Suzuki	24 April 2025	Japanese Championships	Fukui, Japan	
Clean & Jerk	112 kg	Rira Suzuki	1 April 2024	World Cup	Phuket, Thailand	
Total	197 kg	Rira Suzuki	1 April 2024	World Cup	Phuket, Thailand	
55 kg
Snatch	91 kg	Sei Higa	26 April 2024	Japanese Championships	Isahaya, Japan	
Clean & Jerk	118 kg	Mikiko Ando	24 April 2025	Japanese Championships	Fukui, Japan	
Total	206 kg	Mikiko Ando	24 April 2025	Japanese Championships	Fukui, Japan	
59 kg
Snatch	98 kg	Mikiko Ando	5 October 2019	National Sports Festival of Japan	Takahagi, Japan	
Clean & Jerk	131 kg	Mikiko Ando	4 November 2018	World Championships	Ashgabat, Turkmenistan	
Total	226 kg	Mikiko Ando	5 October 2019	National Sports Festival of Japan	Takahagi, Japan	
64 kg
Snatch	97 kg	Mako Yamamoto	23 November 2019		Satsumasendai, Japan	
Clean & Jerk	124 kg	Mako Yamamoto	21 November 2021	Japanese Championships	Tsunan, Japan	
Total	219 kg	Mako Yamamoto	23 November 2019		Satsumasendai, Japan	
71 kg
Snatch	103 kg	Runa Segawa	11 May 2024	Japanese Student Championships	Habikino, Japan	
Clean & Jerk	130 kg	Runa Segawa	7 February 2024	Asian Championships	Tashkent, Uzbekistan	
Total	231 kg	Runa Segawa	14 December 2024		Habikino, Japan	
76 kg
Snatch	104 kg	Ayumi Kamiya	7 November 2018	World Championships	Ashgabat, Turkmenistan	
Clean & Jerk	127 kg	Mina Tanaka	21 November 2024		Takashima, Japan	
Total	225 kg	Akari Nishio	16 May 2025			
Total	225 kg (Note: by official result source; 224 kg by federation source, probably a typo)	Ayumi Kamiya	7 November 2018	World Championships	Ashgabat, Turkmenistan	
81 kg
Snatch	107 kg	Wakana Nagashima	23 July 2023		Kanazawa, Japan	
Clean & Jerk	137 kg	Wakana Nagashima	14 December 2024		Habikino, Japan	
Total	242 kg	Wakana Nagashima	14 December 2024		Habikino, Japan	
87 kg
Snatch	109 kg	Wakana Nagashima	4 July 2025		Japan	
Clean & Jerk	138 kg	Wakana Nagashima	21 November 2024		Takashima, Japan	
Total	245 kg	Wakana Nagashima	27 October 2024		Japan	
+87 kg
Snatch	110 kg	Standard				
Clean & Jerk	138 kg	Yuna Nakajima	1 May 2022	Japanese Championships	Niihama, Japan	
Total	245 kg	Motoka Nakajima	27 August 2025		Japan	

=== Women (1998–2018) ===
Event	Record	Athlete	Date	Meet	Place	Ref
48 kg
Snatch	87 kg	Hiromi Miyake	30 July 2012	Olympic Games	London, Great Britain	
Clean & Jerk	110 kg	Hiromi Miyake	30 October 2005	East Asian Games	Macau, China	
Total	197 kg	Hiromi Miyake	30 July 2012	Olympic Games	London, Great Britain	
53 kg
Snatch	90 kg	Hiromi Miyake	24 June 2011	National Championships		
Clean & Jerk	117 kg	Hiromi Miyake	24 June 2011	National Championships		
Total	207 kg	Hiromi Miyake	24 June 2011	National Championships		
58 kg
Snatch	100 kg	Mikiko Ando	7 October 2018	National Sports Festival	Obama, Japan	
Clean & Jerk	127 kg	Mikiko Ando	26 May 2018	National Championships	Kanazawa, Japan	
Total	223 kg	Mikiko Ando	7 October 2018	National Sports Festival	Obama, Japan	
63 kg
Snatch	98 kg	Namika Matsumoto	19 November 2016			
Clean & Jerk	120 kg	Mikiko Ando	5 October 2016	National Sports Festival	Ōshū, Japan	
Total	214 kg	Namika Matsumoto	19 November 2016			
69 kg
Snatch	97 kg	Ayano Tani	17 November 2010	Asian Games	Guangzhou, China	
Clean & Jerk	122 kg	Rika Saito	13 August 2008	Olympic Games	Beijing, China	
Total	218 kg	Ayano Tani	17 November 2010	Asian Games	Guangzhou, China	
75 kg
Snatch	107 kg	Ayumi Kamiya	20 November 2016			
Clean & Jerk	126 kg	Kazue Imahoko	5 October 2006	World Championships	Santo Domingo, Dominican Republic	
Total	230 kg	Kazue Imahoko	3 November 2005	East Asian Games	Macau, China	
90 kg
Snatch	107 kg	Mami Shimamoto	28 May 2017	National Championships	Oyama, Japan	
Clean & Jerk	130 kg	Mami Shimamoto	28 May 2017	National Championships	Oyama, Japan	
Total	237 kg	Mami Shimamoto	28 May 2017	National Championships	Oyama, Japan	
+90 kg
Snatch	117 kg	Mami Shimamoto	23 May 2016	National Championships	Yamanashi, Japan	
Clean & Jerk	148 kg	Fumiko Jonai	24 September 2010	World Championships	Antalya, Turkey	
Total	260 kg	Mami Shimamoto	13 November 2011	World Championships	Paris, France	
