= 2019 World Weightlifting Championships – Men's 89 kg =

The men's 89 kg competition at the 2019 World Weightlifting Championships was held on 23 September 2019.

== Schedule ==
| Date | Time | Event |
|---|---|---|
| 23 September 2019 | 10:00 | Group C |
| 23 September 2019 | 14:25 | Group B |
| 23 September 2019 | 20:25 | Group A |

== Medalists ==
| Event | Gold | | Silver | | Bronze | |
|---|---|---|---|---|---|---|
| Snatch | Revaz Davitadze (GEO) | 172 kg | Aliaksandr Bersanau (BLR) | 169 kg | Keydomar Vallenilla (VEN) | 169 kg |
| Clean & Jerk | Toshiki Yamamoto (JPN) | 208 kg | Hakob Mkrtchyan (ARM) | 208 kg | Ali Miri (IRI) | 207 kg |
| Total | Hakob Mkrtchyan (ARM) | 375 kg | Ali Miri (IRI) | 374 kg | Revaz Davitadze (GEO) | 371 kg |

== Records ==
Prior to this competition, the existing world records were as follows.

| World Record | Snatch | World Standard | 179 kg | — | 1 November 2018 |
| World Record | Clean & Jerk | World Standard | 216 kg | — | 1 November 2018 |
| World Record | Total | World Standard | 387 kg | — | 1 November 2018 |

== Results ==
| Rank | Athlete | Group | Snatch (kg) | | | | Clean & Jerk (kg) | | | | Total |
| Rank | Athlete | Group | 1 | 2 | 3 | Rank | 1 | 2 | 3 | Rank | Total |
|---|---|---|---|---|---|---|---|---|---|---|---|
| 1st place, gold medalist(s) | Hakob Mkrtchyan (ARM) | A | 163 | 167 | ~~170~~ | 4 | 204 | 208 | — | 2nd place, silver medalist(s) | 375 |
| 2nd place, silver medalist(s) | Ali Miri (IRI) | A | 160 | 165 | 167 | 5 | 202 | 207 | ~~210~~ | 3rd place, bronze medalist(s) | 374 |
| 3rd place, bronze medalist(s) | Revaz Davitadze (GEO) | A | 166 | 169 | 172 | 1st place, gold medalist(s) | 199 | ~~203~~ | ~~204~~ | 8 | 371 |
| 4 | Aliaksandr Bersanau (BLR) | A | 160 | 166 | 169 | 2nd place, silver medalist(s) | 196 | 201 | ~~205~~ | 5 | 370 |
| 5 | Toshiki Yamamoto (JPN) | B | 155 | ~~160~~ | 160 | 13 | 193 | 200 | 208 | 1st place, gold medalist(s) | 368 |
| 6 | Yu Dong-ju (KOR) | B | 157 | ~~162~~ | 162 | 9 | 200 | 205 | ~~209~~ | 4 | 367 |
| 7 | Olfides Sáez (CUB) | B | 157 | 162 | 165 | 6 | 199 | ~~204~~ | ~~204~~ | 7 | 364 |
| 8 | Keydomar Vallenilla (VEN) | A | 164 | 167 | 169 JWR | 3rd place, bronze medalist(s) | 195 | ~~200~~ | ~~200~~ | 12 | 364 |
| 9 | Mohammad Zareei (IRI) | A | 165 | ~~169~~ | ~~170~~ | 7 | 196 | ~~206~~ | ~~207~~ | 10 | 361 |
| 10 | Denis Ulanov (KAZ) | A | 152 | 160 | 163 | 8 | 195 | ~~200~~ | ~~200~~ | 11 | 358 |
| 11 | Davit Hovhannisyan (ARM) | A | ~~160~~ | 160 | ~~165~~ | 14 | 190 | 195 | — | 13 | 355 |
| 12 | Krenar Shoraj (ALB) | B | 153 | 156 | ~~161~~ | 15 | 192 | 198 | — | 9 | 354 |
| 13 | Romain Imadouchène (FRA) | A | 153 | ~~157~~ | ~~157~~ | 18 | ~~199~~ | ~~199~~ | 200 | 6 | 353 |
| 14 | Ruslan Kozhakin (UKR) | B | 154 | 158 | 160 | 12 | 183 | 188 | 191 | 14 | 351 |
| 15 | Roman Chepik (RUS) | B | 155 | 160 | ~~163~~ | 10 | 184 | 190 | ~~195~~ | 15 | 350 |
| 16 | Jordan Cantrell (USA) | B | 153 | 157 | 160 | 11 | 185 | ~~189~~ | 190 | 16 | 350 |
| 17 | David Samayoa (CAN) | B | 150 | 155 | ~~158~~ | 16 | 180 | 188 | ~~191~~ | 17 | 343 |
| 18 | Daýanç Aşyrow (TKM) | B | ~~150~~ | 150 | 154 | 17 | 180 | 185 | ~~189~~ | 18 | 339 |
| 19 | Forrester Osei (GHA) | C | ~~145~~ | ~~145~~ | 145 | 19 | ~~181~~ | ~~181~~ | 181 | 20 | 326 |
| 20 | Karol Samko (SVK) | B | 136 | 139 | ~~143~~ | 24 | 184 | ~~188~~ | — | 19 | 323 |
| 21 | Ahmed Abu-Zriba (LBA) | C | 141 | ~~146~~ | ~~148~~ | 21 | 170 | 176 | 179 | 21 | 320 |
| 22 | Amar Musić (CRO) | C | 136 | 141 | ~~147~~ | 22 | 170 | ~~176~~ | 177 | 22 | 318 |
| 23 | Noah Santavy (CAN) | C | 135 | ~~140~~ | 140 | 23 | 165 | 170 | ~~175~~ | 23 | 310 |
| 24 | Camilo Zapata (CHI) | C | 135 | 140 | 143 | 20 | ~~165~~ | 165 | ~~170~~ | 24 | 308 |
| 25 | Ensar Musić (CRO) | C | 115 | 120 | ~~126~~ | 28 | ~~165~~ | ~~165~~ | 165 | 25 | 285 |
| 26 | Federico Santana (URU) | C | 117 | 122 | ~~125~~ | 27 | 142 | 145 | — | 26 | 267 |
| — | Tobias Knudsen (DEN) | C | 132 | ~~136~~ | 136 | 25 | ~~165~~ | ~~165~~ | ~~165~~ | — | — |
| — | Afiq Haziq Daniel (MAS) | C | 128 | 131 | ~~133~~ | 26 | ~~161~~ | ~~161~~ | ~~161~~ | — | — |
| — | Safaa Rashed (IRQ) | A | ~~160~~ | ~~163~~ | — | — | — | — | — | — | — |
| DQ | Maksim Mudreuski (BLR) | A | 160 | ~~165~~ | ~~166~~ | — | 191 | 196 | ~~200~~ | — | — |
| DQ | Irmantas Kačinskas (LTU) | C | 142 | 146 | 150 | — | 171 | ~~177~~ | 177 | — | — |
