= 2016 Summer Olympics medal table =

2016 Summer Olympics medals
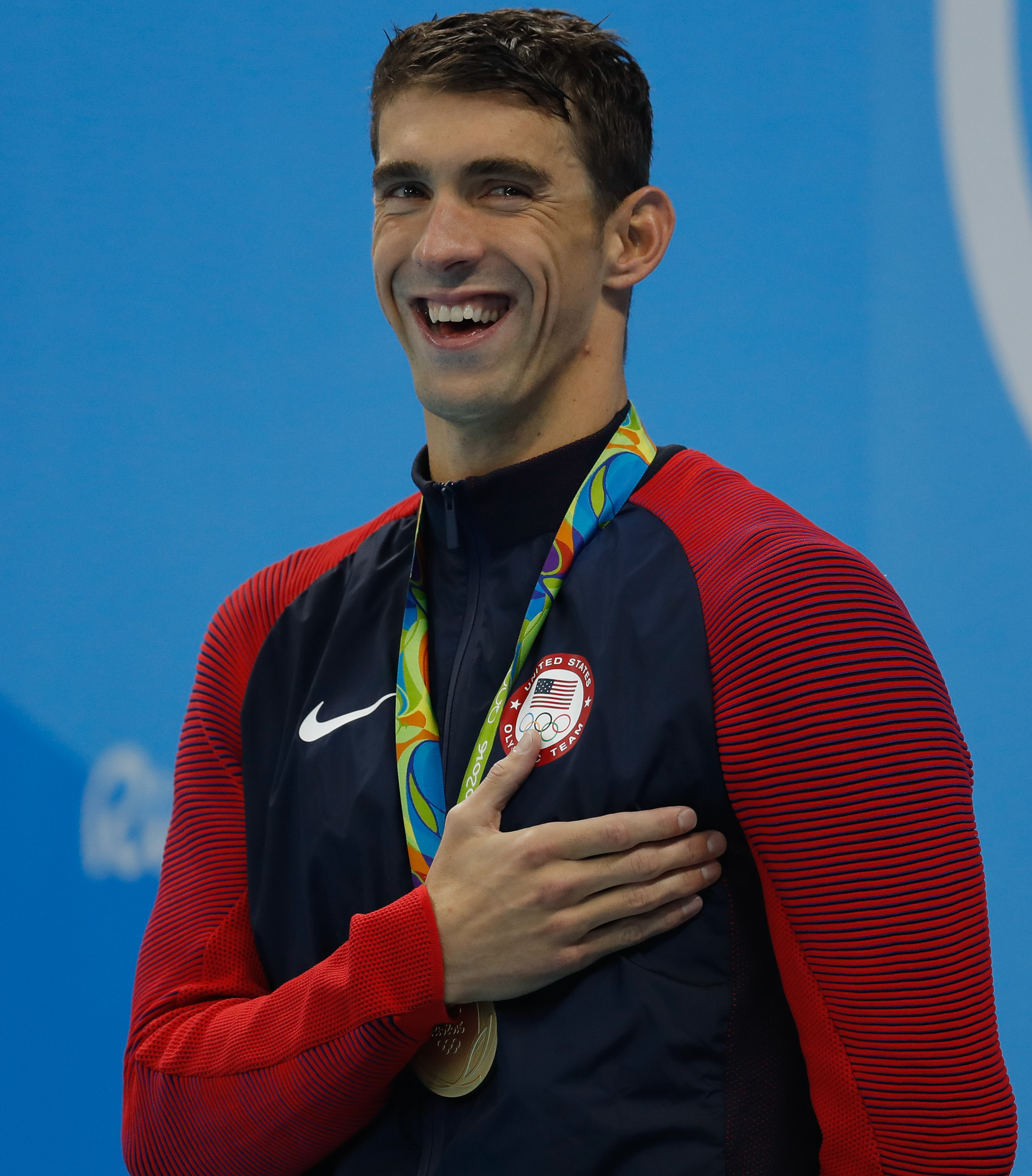
- Michael Phelps (pictured) won six medals at the 2016 Summer Olympics, the most of any competing athlete.
- Location: Rio de Janeiro, Brazil

Highlights
- Most gold medals: United States (46)
- Most total medals: United States (121)
- Medalling NOCs: 86

The 2016 Summer Olympics, officially known as the Games of the XXXI Olympiad, and officially branded as Rio 2016, were an international multi-sport event held from 5 to 21 August 2016 in Rio de Janeiro, Brazil, with preliminary events in some sports beginning on 3 August. 11,238 athletes representing 207 National Olympic Committees (NOCs) participated, including first-time entrants Kosovo, South Sudan, and the Refugee Olympic Team. The games featured 306 medal events in 28 sports and 41 disciplines. The 2016 Summer Games were the first Olympics to be held in South America.

Athletes representing 87 NOCs received at least one medal, breaking the record of most NOCs winning a medal at a single edition of the Olympics. (Note: Following reallocation due to doping sanctions, an 87th country was later awarded a medal at the 2008 Summer Olympics, tying the record. The total count of NOCs to win a medal at the 2016 games later became 86 after Moldova's Serghei Tarnovschi was stripped of his bronze medal, the country's only medal at the 2016 Summer Olympics. This caused the record to be held solely by the 2008 games until it was broken at the 2020 Summer Olympics.) Athletes from 59 nations earned gold medals at these games, also breaking the record for the most nations winning gold at a single games. Bahrain, (Note: Bahrain was retroactively awarded a gold medal in 2021 for the 2012 Summer Olympics due to a medal reallocation of the women's 1500 metres race. Maryam Yusuf Jamal had originally finished third.) Fiji, Ivory Coast, Jordan, Kosovo, Puerto Rico, Singapore, Tajikistan, and Vietnam won their first Olympic gold medals. They were also the first Olympic medals of any kind for Fiji, Jordan, and Kosovo. Kuwaiti shooter Fehaid Al-Deehani became the first independent athlete to win a gold medal.

The United States led the medal table both in number of gold medals won and in overall medals, winning 46 and 121 respectively. American swimmer Michael Phelps won the most gold medals at the games with five and the most total medals with six (five gold, one silver). This marked the fourth consecutive Summer Olympic Games in which Phelps led all athletes in gold and total medals.

== Medals ==
The 2016 Olympic medals were the largest diameter of any medals presented at the Olympics up to this point. The golds were purer than any presented at all preceding Olympics. The silvers were made from recycling mirrors, solder, and X-ray plates. Just under half of the copper used in the bronze medals was recycled from normal operations at the Brazilian Mint. The reverse of the medals features Nike, the Greek goddess of victory.

== Medal table ==
World map showing the medal achievements of each country during the 2016 Summer Olympics. Legend: represents countries that won at least one gold medal. represents countries that won at least one silver medal but no gold medals. represents countries that won at least one bronze medal but no gold or silver medals. represents countries that did not win any medals. represents entities that did not participate in the 2016 Summer Olympics.

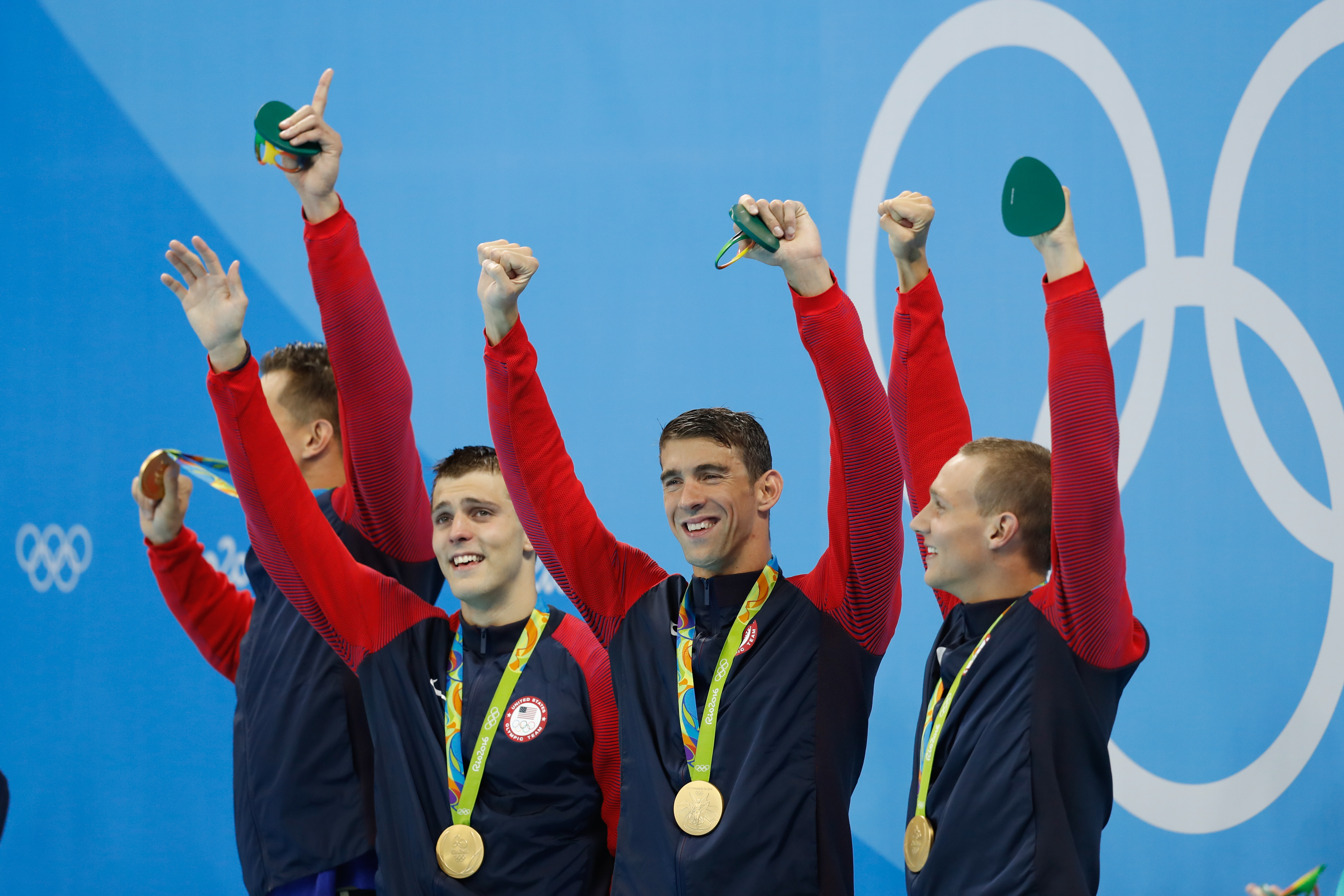
The American final team, after winning the men's 4 × 100 metre freestyle relay at the 2016 Olympics. From left to right: Nathan Adrian, Ryan Held, Michael Phelps, and Caeleb Dressel.

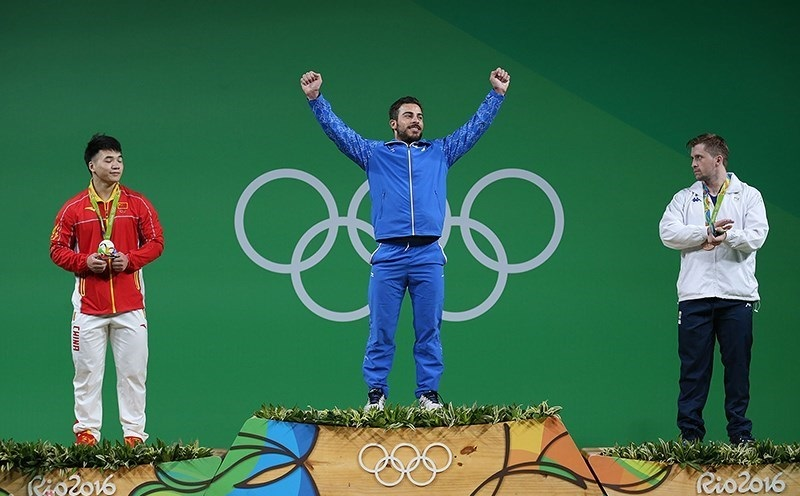
Medalists in the men's 85 kg weightlifting event. From left to right: Tian Tao (China, silver), Kianoush Rostami (Iran, gold), and Gabriel Sîncrăian (Romania, bronze, later disqualified).

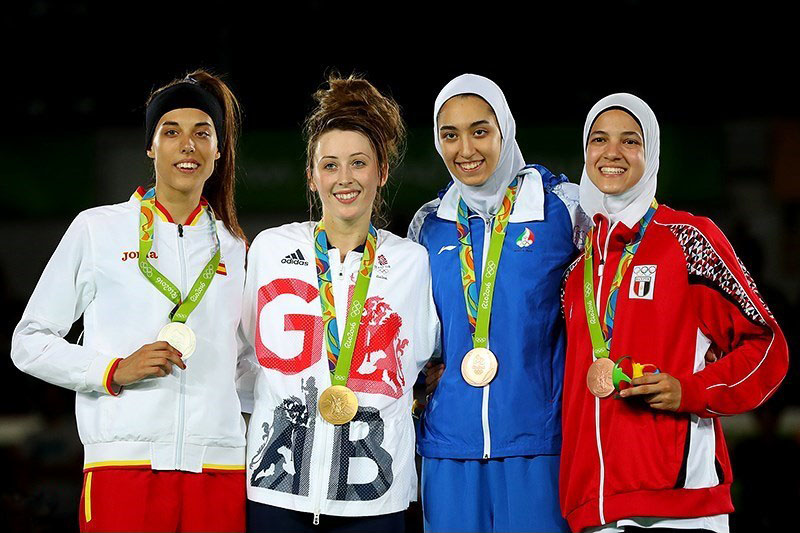
Women's 57 kg taekwondo medalists at the 2016 games. From left to right: Eva Calvo (Spain, silver), Jade Jones (Great Britain, gold), Kimia Alizadeh (Iran, bronze), and Hedaya Malak (Egypt, bronze).

The medal table is based on information provided by the International Olympic Committee (IOC) and is consistent with IOC conventional sorting in its published medal tables. The table uses the Olympic medal table sorting method. By default, the table is ordered by the number of gold medals the athletes from a nation have won, where a nation is an entity represented by a NOC. The number of silver medals is taken into consideration next and then the number of bronze medals. If teams are still tied, equal ranking is given and they are listed alphabetically by their IOC country code.

Events in boxing result in a bronze medal being awarded to each of the two competitors who lose their semi-final matches, as opposed to them fighting in a third place tie breaker. Other combat sports, which include, judo, taekwondo, and wrestling, use a repechage system which also results in two bronze medals being awarded.

Two gold medals and no silver medals were awarded due to a first-place tie in the women's 100 metre freestyle swimming event, while three silver medals and no bronze medals were awarded due to a second-place tie in the men's 100 metre butterfly swimming event. Additionally, two bronze medals were awarded for a third-place tie in the women's 100 metre backstroke swimming and in the men's K-1 200 metres canoeing events.

Nijat Rahimov of Kazakhstan originally won the gold medal in men's 77 kg weightlifting but was disqualified in March 2022 by the Court of Arbitration for Sport (CAS) for doping violations. As of July 2024, the medals have not yet been re-allocated and will not be until final rulings by the IOC have been issued.

Key

‡ Changes in medal standings (see below)

* Host nation (Brazil)

2016 Summer Olympics medal table (Note: Figures in table reflect all official changes in medal standings.)
Rank	NOC	Gold	Silver	Bronze	Total
1	United States	46	37	38	121
2	Great Britain	27	23	17	67
3	China	26	18	26	70
4	Russia‡	19	17	20	56
5	Germany	17	10	15	42
6	Japan	12	8	21	41
7	France	10	18	14	42
8	South Korea	9	3	9	21
9	Italy	8	12	8	28
10	Australia	8	11	10	29
11	Netherlands	8	7	4	19
12	Hungary	8	3	4	15
13	Brazil*	7	6	6	19
14	Spain	7	4	6	17
15	Kenya	6	6	1	13
16	Jamaica	6	3	2	11
17	Croatia	5	3	2	10
18	Cuba	5	2	4	11
19	New Zealand	4	9	5	18
20	Canada	4	3	15	22
21	Uzbekistan	4	2	7	13
22	Colombia‡	3	2	3	8
23	Switzerland	3	2	2	7
24	Iran	3	1	4	8
25	Greece	3	1	2	6
26	Argentina	3	1	0	4
27	Denmark	2	6	7	15
28	Sweden	2	6	3	11
29	South Africa	2	6	2	10
30	Kazakhstan‡	2	5	10	17
31	Ukraine	2	5	4	11
32	Serbia	2	4	2	8
33	Poland	2	3	6	11
34	North Korea	2	3	2	7
35	Belgium	2	2	2	6
35	Thailand	2	2	2	6
37	Slovakia	2	2	0	4
38	Georgia	2	1	4	7
39	Azerbaijan	1	7	10	18
40	Belarus	1	4	4	9
41	Turkey	1	3	4	8
42	Armenia	1	3	0	4
43	Czech Republic	1	2	7	10
44	Ethiopia	1	2	5	8
45	Slovenia	1	2	1	4
46	Indonesia	1	2	0	3
47	Romania‡	1	1	2	4
48	Bahrain	1	1	0	2
48	Vietnam	1	1	0	2
50	Chinese Taipei	1	0	2	3
51	Bahamas	1	0	1	2
51	Independent Olympic Athletes (Note: The Independent Olympic Athletes team was composed of nine Kuwaiti athletes competing under the Olympic flag, as the Kuwait Olympic Committee had been suspended by the IOC due to political interference. While the Refugee Olympic Team also competed under the Olympic flag, they were not considered independent.)	1	0	1	2
51	Ivory Coast	1	0	1	2
54	Fiji	1	0	0	1
54	Jordan	1	0	0	1
54	Kosovo	1	0	0	1
54	Puerto Rico	1	0	0	1
54	Singapore	1	0	0	1
54	Tajikistan	1	0	0	1
60	Malaysia	0	4	1	5
61	Mexico	0	3	2	5
62	Venezuela‡	0	2	1	3
63	Algeria	0	2	0	2
63	Ireland	0	2	0	2
65	Lithuania	0	1	3	4
66	Bulgaria	0	1	2	3
67	India	0	1	1	2
67	Mongolia	0	1	1	2
69	Burundi	0	1	0	1
69	Grenada	0	1	0	1
69	Niger	0	1	0	1
69	Philippines	0	1	0	1
69	Qatar	0	1	0	1
74	Norway	0	0	4	4
75	Egypt	0	0	3	3
75	Tunisia	0	0	3	3
77	Israel	0	0	2	2
78	Austria	0	0	1	1
78	Dominican Republic	0	0	1	1
78	Estonia	0	0	1	1
78	Finland	0	0	1	1
78	Morocco	0	0	1	1
78	Nigeria	0	0	1	1
78	Portugal	0	0	1	1
78	Trinidad and Tobago	0	0	1	1
78	United Arab Emirates	0	0	1	1
Totals (86 entries)		306	307	359	972

== Changes in medal standings ==
List of official changes in medal standings
Ruling date	Event	Athlete (NOC)	1st place, gold medalist(s)	2nd place, silver medalist(s)	3rd place, bronze medalist(s)	Net change	Comment
18 August 2016	Weightlifting, men's 69 kg	Izzat Artykov (KGZ) DSQ			−1	−1	On 18 August 2016, Kyrgyz weightlifter Izzat Artykov was stripped of his bronze medal in the men's 69 kg event after testing positive for strychnine. Luis Javier Mosquera of Colombia, who had been the fourth-place finisher before Artykov's disqualification, was moved into third place.
18 August 2016	Weightlifting, men's 69 kg	Luis Javier Mosquera (COL)			+1	+1	On 18 August 2016, Kyrgyz weightlifter Izzat Artykov was stripped of his bronze medal in the men's 69 kg event after testing positive for strychnine. Luis Javier Mosquera of Colombia, who had been the fourth-place finisher before Artykov's disqualification, was moved into third place.
8 December 2016	Weightlifting, men's 85 kg	Gabriel Sîncrăian (ROU) DSQ			−1	−1	On 8 December 2016, the CAS disqualified weightlifter Gabriel Sîncrăian of Romania after he tested positive for exogenous testosterone and boxer Misha Aloian of Russia after he tested positive for tuaminoheptane. In the men's 85 kg weightlifting event Denis Ulanov of Kazakhstan was moved into third place. In the men's flyweight (52 kg) boxing event Yoel Finol of Venezuela was moved into second place; the released bronze medal has not been awarded to anyone.
8 December 2016	Weightlifting, men's 85 kg	Denis Ulanov (KAZ)			+1	+1	On 8 December 2016, the CAS disqualified weightlifter Gabriel Sîncrăian of Romania after he tested positive for exogenous testosterone and boxer Misha Aloian of Russia after he tested positive for tuaminoheptane. In the men's 85 kg weightlifting event Denis Ulanov of Kazakhstan was moved into third place. In the men's flyweight (52 kg) boxing event Yoel Finol of Venezuela was moved into second place; the released bronze medal has not been awarded to anyone.
8 December 2016	Boxing, men's flyweight	Misha Aloyan (RUS) DSQ		−1		−1	On 8 December 2016, the CAS disqualified weightlifter Gabriel Sîncrăian of Romania after he tested positive for exogenous testosterone and boxer Misha Aloian of Russia after he tested positive for tuaminoheptane. In the men's 85 kg weightlifting event Denis Ulanov of Kazakhstan was moved into third place. In the men's flyweight (52 kg) boxing event Yoel Finol of Venezuela was moved into second place; the released bronze medal has not been awarded to anyone.
8 December 2016	Boxing, men's flyweight	Yoel Finol (VEN)		+1	−1	0	On 8 December 2016, the CAS disqualified weightlifter Gabriel Sîncrăian of Romania after he tested positive for exogenous testosterone and boxer Misha Aloian of Russia after he tested positive for tuaminoheptane. In the men's 85 kg weightlifting event Denis Ulanov of Kazakhstan was moved into third place. In the men's flyweight (52 kg) boxing event Yoel Finol of Venezuela was moved into second place; the released bronze medal has not been awarded to anyone.
30 January 2017	Canoeing, men's C-1 1000 metres	Serghei Tarnovschi (MDA) DSQ			−1	−1	Serghei Tarnovschi of Moldova was stripped of his bronze medal in the men's C-1 1000 metres canoeing event after testing positive for GHRP-2, a growth hormone-releasing peptide.
30 January 2017	Canoeing, men's C-1 1000 metres	Ilia Shtokalov (RUS)			+1	+1	Serghei Tarnovschi of Moldova was stripped of his bronze medal in the men's C-1 1000 metres canoeing event after testing positive for GHRP-2, a growth hormone-releasing peptide.
22 March 2022	Weightlifting, men's 77 kg	Nijat Rahimov (KAZ) DSQ	−1			−1	Nijat Rahimov of Kazakhstan was stripped of his gold medal in the men's 77 kg weightlifting event for doping. The IOC has not yet redistributed the medal.

List of official changes by country
NOC	Gold	Silver	Bronze	Net change
Colombia			+1	+1
Kazakhstan	−1		+1	0
Kyrgyzstan			−1	−1
Moldova			−1	−1
Romania			−1	−1
Russia		−1	+1	0
Venezuela		+1	−1	0

== See also ==
- List of 2016 Summer Olympics medal winners
- All-time Olympic Games medal table
- 2016 Summer Paralympics medal table
