= 2022 World Weightlifting Championships – Men's 96 kg =

The men's 96 kilograms competition at the 2022 World Weightlifting Championships was held on 12 December 2022.

== Schedule ==
Date	Time	Event
12 December 2022	09:00	Group C
12 December 2022	14:00	Group B
12 December 2022	16:30	Group A

== Medalists ==
Event	Gold		Silver		Bronze	
Snatch	Lesman Paredes (BHR)	185 kg	Nurgissa Adiletuly (KAZ)	174 kg	Jhor Moreno (COL)	171 kg
Clean & Jerk	Romain Imadouchène (FRA)	213 kg	Lesman Paredes (BHR)	212 kg	Jhor Moreno (COL)	209 kg
Total	Lesman Paredes (BHR)	397 kg	Nurgissa Adiletuly (KAZ)	383 kg	Jhor Moreno (COL)	380 kg

== Records ==
Prior to this competition, the existing world records were as follows.

World record	Snatch	Lesman Paredes (COL)	187 kg	Tashkent, Uzbekistan	14 December 2021
World record	Clean & Jerk	Tian Tao (CHN)	231 kg	Tokyo, Japan	7 July 2019
World record	Total	Sohrab Moradi (IRI)	416 kg	Ashgabat, Turkmenistan	7 November 2018

== Results ==
Rank	Athlete	Group	Snatch (kg)				Clean & Jerk (kg)				Total
Rank	Athlete	Group	1	2	3	Rank	1	2	3	Rank	Total
1st place, gold medalist(s)	Lesman Paredes (BHR)	A	176	181	185	1st place, gold medalist(s)	207	212	~~214~~	2nd place, silver medalist(s)	397
2nd place, silver medalist(s)	Nurgissa Adiletuly (KAZ)	A	170	~~174~~	174	2nd place, silver medalist(s)	205	~~209~~	209	4	383
3rd place, bronze medalist(s)	Jhor Moreno (COL)	A	165	171	~~174~~	3rd place, bronze medalist(s)	200	205	209	3rd place, bronze medalist(s)	380
4	Romain Imadouchène (FRA)	A	160	165	~~170~~	7	205	209	213	1st place, gold medalist(s)	378
5	Sarat Sumpradit (THA)	A	~~167~~	167	~~172~~	4	~~205~~	~~206~~	206	6	373
6	Hakob Mkrtchyan (ARM)	A	163	~~168~~	~~168~~	10	205	~~211~~	~~211~~	7	368
7	Yeimar Mendoza (COL)	A	~~166~~	166	~~171~~	5	200	~~205~~	~~206~~	9	366
8	Cyrille Tchatchet (GBR)	B	154	159	~~161~~	15	190	~~195~~	197	10	356
9	Irakli Gobejishvili (GEO)	B	160	~~164~~	~~164~~	13	190	195	~~198~~	11	355
10	Marco Machado (BRA)	B	163	~~166~~	~~166~~	8	~~189~~	190	~~195~~	14	353
11	Alisher Seitkazy (KAZ)	B	150	156	160	14	~~190~~	191	~~200~~	13	351
12	Wilmer Contreras (ECU)	B	150	155	~~160~~	17	183	188	192	12	347
13	Hakan Şükrü Kurnaz (TUR)	B	~~163~~	163	~~166~~	9	179	~~183~~	~~183~~	18	342
14	Amel Atencia (PER)	C	148	~~152~~	155	16	178	~~184~~	186	15	341
15	José López (MEX)	B	140	~~145~~	~~145~~	23	185	191	200	8	340
16	Theodoros Iakovidis (GRE)	B	150	155	~~159~~	18	180	~~188~~	~~188~~	17	335
17	Jonathan Ramos (MEX)	C	140	~~145~~	145	21	180	185	~~190~~	16	330
18	Omed Alam (DEN)	B	~~150~~	150	~~154~~	19	178	~~183~~	~~183~~	19	328
19	Forrester Osei (GHA)	C	~~146~~	146	~~150~~	20	175	~~180~~	—	22	321
20	Amar Musić (CRO)	C	141	~~145~~	~~145~~	22	170	176	~~181~~	20	317
21	Lukas Kordušas (LTU)	C	132	~~137~~	~~137~~	24	170	176	~~180~~	21	308
22	Christopher Griffith (BAR)	C	110	116	122	25	140	147	155	24	277
23	Quontana Clarke (BAR)	C	95	100	107	26	~~125~~	125	~~130~~	25	232
—	Davit Hovhannisyan (ARM)	A	165	~~170~~	~~172~~	6	~~200~~	~~200~~	—	—	—
—	İbrahim Arat (TUR)	A	161	~~165~~	~~166~~	11	~~206~~	~~207~~	~~207~~	—	—
—	Mohamed Abdelalim (EGY)	A	~~161~~	161	~~167~~	12	~~201~~	~~201~~	~~201~~	—	—
—	Jang Yeon-hak (KOR)	A	~~171~~	~~172~~	~~172~~	—	201	206	~~210~~	5	—
—	Joen Vikingsson Sjöblom (SWE)	C	~~147~~	~~147~~	~~147~~	—	175	~~180~~	~~180~~	23	—
—	Chen Po-jen (TPE)	A	—	—	—	—	—	—	—	—	—
