= Weightlifting at the 2017 Summer Universiade – Men's 85 kg =

Men's 85 kg at the XXIX Summer Universiade
- Venues: Tamkang University Shao-Mo Memorial Gymnasium 7F
- Dates: 23 August 2017
- Competitors: 24 from 21 nations

Medalists
1st place, gold medalist(s)		Denis Ulanov	Kazakhstan
2nd place, silver medalist(s)		Andranik Karapetyan	Armenia
3rd place, bronze medalist(s)		Jang Yeon-hak	South Korea

The men's 85 kg event at the 2017 Summer Universiade was held on 23 August at the Tamkang University Shao-Mo Memorial Gymnasium 7F.

== Records ==
Prior to this competition, the existing world and Universiade records were as follows.

- Initial records

Category		Nation	Athlete	Record	Place	Date	Meet
World record	Snatch	Belarus	Andrei Rybakou	187 kg	Chiangmai, Thailand	22 September 2007	2007 World Championships
World record	Clean & Jerk	Iran	Kianoush Rostami	220 kg	Tehran, Iran	31 May 2016	2016 Fajr Cup
World record	Total	Iran	Kianoush Rostami	396 kg	Rio de Janeiro, Brazil	12 August 2016	2016 Summer Olympics
Universiade records	Snatch	Russia (RUS)	Artem Okulov	168 kg	Kazan, Russia	10 July 2013	2013 Summer Universiade
Universiade records	Clean & Jerk	Russia (RUS)	Apti Aukhadov	205 kg	Kazan, Russia	10 July 2013	2013 Summer Universiade
Universiade records	Total	Russia (RUS)	Apti Aukhadov	372 kg	Kazan, Russia	10 July 2013	2013 Summer Universiade

- Broken records

Category		Nation	Athlete	Record	Place	Date
Universiade records	Snatch	Armenia (ARM)	Andranik Karapetyan	170 kg	New Taipei, Taiwan	23 August 2017

== Results ==
Rank	Athlete	Group	Body weight	Snatch (kg)				Clean & Jerk (kg)				Total
Rank	Athlete	Group	Body weight	1	2	3	Result	1	2	3	Result	Total
1st place, gold medalist(s)	Denis Ulanov (KAZ)	A	84.82	165	~~170~~	~~170~~	165	~~200~~	200	~~221~~	200	365
2nd place, silver medalist(s)	Andranik Karapetyan (ARM)	A	84.82	165	170	~~175~~	170 UR	185	190	194	194	364
3rd place, bronze medalist(s)	Jang Yeon-hak (KOR)	A	83.93	~~158~~	159	163	163	~~187~~	191	~~194~~	191	354
4	Pavel Khadasevich (BLR)	A	84.92	160	~~165~~	~~165~~	160	190	~~195~~	~~195~~	190	350
5	Ali Makvandi (IRI)	A	84.82	~~145~~	145	150	150	181	191	193	193	343
6	Georgii Sidakov (RUS)	A	83.95	148	~~155~~	155	155	175	180	~~185~~	180	335
7	Damian Piotr Szczepanik (POL)	A	84.63	~~145~~	~~145~~	145	145	180	~~187~~	~~187~~	180	325
8	Marin Gologan (ROU)	A	84.75	140	~~145~~	145	145	170	177	~~181~~	177	322
9	Banyat Tawnok (THA)	B	83.93	141	146	150	150	~~170~~	170	~~175~~	170	320
10	Mathieu Marineau (CAN)	B	84.77	135	~~139~~	140	140	170	~~176~~	176	176	316
11	Zachary Charles Karlins (USA)	B	84.42	126	~~129~~	130	130	160	165	~~172~~	165	295
12	Beau James Garrett (AUS)	B	84.77	125	130	~~135~~	130	155	160	165	165	305
13	Sami Joonas Raappana (FIN)	B	84.25	123	~~127~~	~~127~~	123	159	162	168	168	291
14	Cameron Thomas Urgert (NZL)	B	84.08	128	132	~~135~~	132	148	152	~~155~~	152	284
15	Laurynas Antanaitis (LTU)	B	84.29	125	~~130~~	131	131	~~150~~	150	~~153~~	150	281
16	Liam Christopher Saxby (AUS)	B	84.47	116	120	122	122	~~142~~	142	146	146	268
17	Supun T. Warnasinghe (SRI)	B	79.68	90	100	~~105~~	100	118	125	~~130~~	125	225
18	Thomas Holdersen (DEN)	B	84.56	97	~~103~~	~~106~~	97	120	125	~~129~~	125	222
19	Ng Choon Yeow (SGP)	B	84.05	65	70	75	75	130	~~136~~	~~136~~	130	205
20	Haneef Azher (SRI)	B	81.03	85	~~90~~	~~90~~	85	105	~~110~~	~~110~~	105	190
	Masoud Chatraei (IRI)	A	84.50	159	~~164~~	~~165~~	159	~~192~~	~~192~~	~~192~~	–	–
	Ihor Konotop (UKR)	A	84.30	150	~~155~~	~~155~~	150	~~190~~	–	–	–	–
	Josue Lucas Ferreira (BRA)	A	84.24	146	~~152~~	~~152~~	146	~~175~~	~~183~~	~~183~~	–	–
	Peter Polacek (SVK)	B	84.54	~~132~~	~~134~~	~~134~~	–					–
