= Elham Hosseini =

Iranian weightlifter (born 1988)

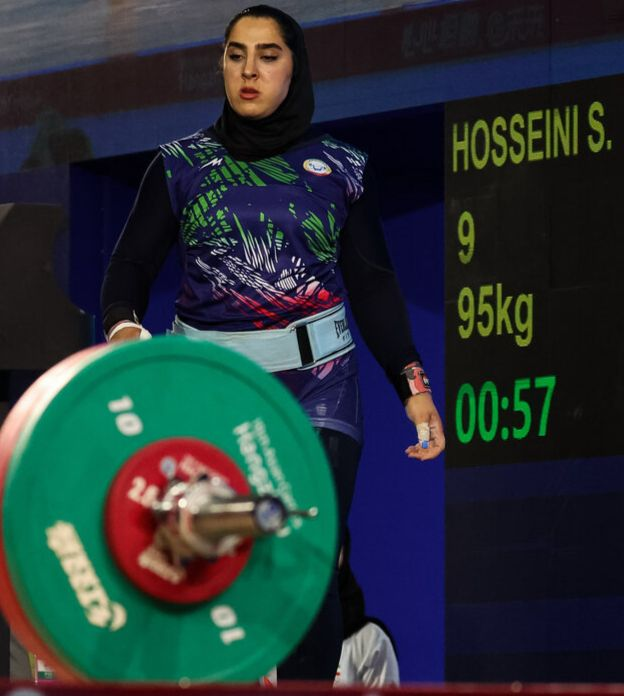

Personal information
- Native name: سیده الهام حسینی
- Born: Seyedeh Elham Hosseini; 16 September 1988 (age 37) Azna, Dorud, Lorestan, Iran
- Education: Shahid Rajaee Teacher Training University; Kharazmi University
- Occupation: Exercise physiology
- Weight: 80.85 kg (178.2 lb)

Sport
- Country: Iran
- Sport: Weightlifting
- Event: 81 kg

Achievements and titles
- Personal bests: Snatch: 106 kg (2023); Clean and jerk: 131 kg (2023); Total: 237 kg (2023)
Medal record
Women's weightlifting
Representing Iran
Asian Championships
Gold medal – first place	2022 Manama	81 kg
Islamic Solidarity Games
Bronze medal – third place	2021 Konya	81 kg

Seyedeh Elham Hosseini (Persian: سیده الهام حسینی; born 16 September 1988) is an Iranian weightlifter. She won 3 gold medals in the 2022 Asian Weightlifting Championships event at the 81 kg, held in Manama, Bahrain.

She is the first Iranian women who won Gold medal in Asian Weightlifting Championships ever.

She is the record holder of Iranian women's weightlifting in 76 and 81 kg categories.video with subtitles

== Major results ==
Year	Venue	Weight	Snatch (kg)				Clean & Jerk (kg)				Total	Rank
Year	Venue	Weight	1	2	3	Rank	1	2	3	Rank	Total	Rank
World Championships
2019	Pattaya, Thailand	71 kg	83	~~90~~	~~91~~	21	103	108	~~112~~	13	191	16
2021	Tashkent, Uzbekistan	81 kg	91	96	98	8	116	~~125~~	125	6	223	6
2022	Bogotá, Colombia	81 kg	98	~~102~~	104	12	~~121~~	122	~~127~~	16	226	15
2023	Riyadh, Saudi Arabia	81 kg	96	~~101~~	~~103~~	21	~~123~~	125	~~130~~	16	221	15
Asian Games
2023	Hangzhou, China	87 kg	~~95~~	95	~~100~~	10	--	--	--	--	--	--
Asian Championships
2019	Ningbo, China	71 kg	73	78	~~82~~	7	~~93~~	93	98	6	176	6
2021	Tashkent, Uzbekistan	81 kg	91	~~99~~	~~99~~	6	111	118	122	4	213	5
2022	Manama, Bahrain	81 kg	97	100	102	1st place, gold medalist(s)	121	125	~~128~~	1st place, gold medalist(s)	227	1st place, gold medalist(s)
2023	Jinju, South Korea	81 kg	101	~~105~~	106	5	125	~~131~~	131	6	237	5
IWF Grand Prix
2019	Doha, Qatar	76 kg	84	~~89~~	90	9	106	112	~~117~~	10	202	9
Islamic Solidarity Games
2022	Konya, Turkey	81 kg	95	100	~~103~~	1st place, gold medalist(s)	117	123	~~127~~	3rd place, bronze medalist(s)	223	3rd place, bronze medalist(s)
