= Kyle Micallef =

Kyle Micallef may refer to:

- Kyle Micallef (weightlifter)
- Kyle Micallef (swimmer)
