= 2024 World Weightlifting Championships – Men's 96 kg =

Men's 96 kg at the 2024 World Weightlifting Championships
- Venue: Weightlifting Marquee Venue
- Location: Manama, Bahrain
- Dates: 12 December
- Competitors: 26 from 19 nations
- Winning total: 388 kg

Medalists
gold medal	Nurgissa Adiletuly	Kazakhstan
silver medal	Revaz Davitadze	Georgia
bronze medal	Ali Aalipour	Iran

The men's 96 kilograms competition at the 2024 World Weightlifting Championships was held on 12 December 2024.

== Schedule ==
Date	Time	Event
12 December 2024	11:00	Group C
12 December 2024	13:00	Group B
12 December 2024	17:30	Group A

== Records ==
Prior to this competition, the existing world records were as follows.

World record	Snatch	Lesman Paredes (COL)	187 kg	Tashkent, Uzbekistan	14 December 2021
World record	Clean & jerk	Tian Tao (CHN)	231 kg	Tokyo, Japan	7 July 2019
World record	Total	Sohrab Moradi (IRI)	416 kg	Ashgabat, Turkmenistan	7 November 2018

== Results ==
Rank	Athlete	Group	Snatch (kg)				Clean & Jerk (kg)				Total
Rank	Athlete	Group	1	2	3	Rank	1	2	3	Rank	Total
1st place, gold medalist(s)	Nurgissa Adiletuly (KAZ)	A	170	174	~~177~~	4	206	212	214	2nd place, silver medalist(s)	388
2nd place, silver medalist(s)	Revaz Davitadze (GEO)	A	171	175	177	1st place, gold medalist(s)	200	206	210	6	387
3rd place, bronze medalist(s)	Ali Aalipour (IRI)	A	168	~~173~~	173	5	205	~~214~~	214	3rd place, bronze medalist(s)	387
4	Qian Feixiang (CHN)	B	~~168~~	170	175	3rd place, bronze medalist(s)	200	206	210	5	385
5	Sarat Sumpradit (THA)	A	168	172	~~176~~	7	200	207	212	4	384
6	Won Jong-beom (KOR)	A	167	~~173~~	~~173~~	10	211	214	~~222~~	1st place, gold medalist(s)	381
7	Alireza Moeini (IRI)	A	176	~~179~~	~~179~~	2nd place, silver medalist(s)	~~193~~	193	202	10	378
8	Mahmoud Hassan (EGY)	A	166	171	~~173~~	8	~~203~~	~~203~~	203	9	374
9	Masashi Nishikawa (JPN)	B	165	170	172	6	192	200	~~204~~	13	372
10	Ramiro Mora Romero (WRT)	B	161	166	~~171~~	11	203	~~207~~	~~207~~	7	369
11	Óscar Garcés (COL)	B	~~162~~	162	~~165~~	13	~~203~~	203	~~208~~	8	365
12	Yeimar Mendoza (COL)	B	~~160~~	~~160~~	160	17	190	195	201	11	361
13	Irakli Gobejishvili (GEO)	B	163	~~167~~	167	9	190	~~196~~	~~198~~	19	357
14	Anton Serdiukov (UKR)	B	~~158~~	~~158~~	159	18	189	193	198	14	357
15	Artūrs Vasiļonoks (LAT)	C	152	156	~~160~~	19	188	195	200	12	356
16	Ali Al-Othman (KSA)	C	150	155	~~159~~	22	187	193	197	15	352
17	Maksym Dombrovskyi (UKR)	B	155	159	162	14	190	~~195~~	—	20	352
18	Kirill Staroverkin (KAZ)	B	155	160	~~163~~	16	185	189	192	18	352
19	Jonathan Ramos (MEX)	C	150	155	~~158~~	21	190	195	~~200~~	16	350
20	Patryk Sawulski (POL)	B	152	156	~~160~~	20	~~188~~	188	~~194~~	22	344
21	José López (MEX)	C	145	150	~~155~~	23	193	~~201~~	~~201~~	17	343
22	Resul Rejepow (TKM)	C	155	160	~~163~~	15	~~178~~	180	~~185~~	24	340
23	Yannick Tschan (SUI)	C	149	~~152~~	~~152~~	24	179	184	188	21	337
24	Karol Samko (SVK)	C	135	140	143	25	180	~~189~~	~~189~~	23	323
—	Davit Hovhannisyan (ARM)	A	163	~~167~~	~~167~~	12	~~202~~	~~202~~	—	—	—
—	Hakob Mkrtchyan (ARM)	A	—	—	—	—	—	—	—	—	—
—	Adam (SUD)	C	Did not start								
