= Igor Son =

Kazakhstani weightlifter (born 1998)

Personal information
- Nationality: Kazakhstani
- Born: 16 November 1998 (age 27)
- Weight: 55.00 kg (121 lb)

Sport
- Country: Kazakhstan
- Sport: Weightlifting
- Event: –55 kg
Medal record
Men's weightlifting
Representing Kazakhstan
Olympic Games
Bronze medal – third place	2020 Tokyo	–61 kg
World Championships
Silver medal – second place	2019 Pattaya	–55 kg

Igor Sergeyevich Son (born 16 November 1998) is a Kazakhstani weightlifter.

In 2017, he competed in the men's 56 kg event at the Asian Indoor and Martial Arts Games held in Ashgabat, Turkmenistan. In 2018, he won the silver medal in the men's 61 kg event at the 5th International Qatar Cup held in Doha, Qatar.

== 2019 World Weightlifting ==
He won the silver medal in the men's 55 kg event at the 2019 World Weightlifting Championships held in Pattaya, Thailand. In that same year, he also won the gold medal in the men's 61 kg event at the 6th International Qatar Cup held in Doha, Qatar.

== 2020 Summer Olympics ==
In 2021, he won the bronze medal in the men's 61 kg event at the 2020 Summer Olympics in Tokyo, Japan.

== Testing ==
In March 2022, he tested positive for a banned substance. In February 2023, he was suspended for eight years. Kazakhstan has a long history of doping among its professional athletes.
