= Revaz Davitadze =

Georgian weightlifter (born 1998)

Personal information
- Nationality: Georgian
- Born: 16 October 1998 (age 28) Tbilisi, Georgia
- Weight: 88.50 kg (195 lb)

Sport
- Country: Georgia
- Sport: Weightlifting
- Event: –89 kg
Medal record
World Championships
Silver medal – second place	2024 Manama	–96 kg
Bronze medal – third place	2018 Ashgabat	–89 kg
Bronze medal – third place	2019 Pattaya	–89 kg
Bronze medal – third place	2021 Tashkent	–89 kg
European Championships
Gold medal – first place	2018 Bucharest	–85 kg
Silver medal – second place	2019 Batumi	–89 kg
Silver medal – second place	2021 Moscow	–89 kg
Silver medal – second place	2025 Chisinau	–96 kg
Bronze medal – third place	2022 Tirana	–89 kg

Revaz Davitadze (Georgian: რევაზ დავითაძე; born 16 October 1998) is a Georgian weightlifter.

== Career ==
Davitadze competed at the men's 85 kg event at the 2018 European Weightlifting Championships in Bucharest, Romania, winning a gold medal at the snatch competition (163 kg), a silver medal at the clean and jerk competition (190 kg) and a gold medal for the total score (353 kg). He was the bronze medalist at the 2018 World Championships, and set the Junior World Records in the snatch and clean and jerk.

At the 2021 European Junior & U23 Weightlifting Championships in Rovaniemi, Finland, he won the silver medal in his event.

== Major results ==
Year	Venue	Weight	Snatch (kg)				Clean & Jerk (kg)				Total	Rank
Year	Venue	Weight	1	2	3	Rank	1	2	3	Rank	Total	Rank
World Championships
2018	Ashgabat, Turkmenistan	89 kg	163	~~167~~	168	4	~~194~~	194	203	5	371	3rd place, bronze medalist(s)
2019	Pattaya, Thailand	89 kg	167	169	172	1st place, gold medalist(s)	199	~~203~~	~~204~~	8	371	3rd place, bronze medalist(s)
2021	Tashkent, Uzbekistan	89 kg	165	169	171	2nd place, silver medalist(s)	195	199	~~203~~	7	370	3rd place, bronze medalist(s)
2022	Bogotá, Colombia	89 kg	165	~~170~~	~~171~~	7	193	~~198~~	~~201~~	13	358	8
2024	Manama, Bahrain	96 kg	171	175	177	1st place, gold medalist(s)	200	206	210	6	387	2nd place, silver medalist(s)
European Championships
2018	Bucharest, Romania	85 kg	156	160	163	1st place, gold medalist(s)	183	187	190	2nd place, silver medalist(s)	353	1st place, gold medalist(s)
2019	Batumi, Georgia	89 kg	164	167	170	1st place, gold medalist(s)	194	~~199~~	200	2nd place, silver medalist(s)	370	2nd place, silver medalist(s)
2021	Moscow, Russia	89 kg	166	171	~~176~~	2nd place, silver medalist(s)	198	203	~~205~~	1st place, gold medalist(s)	374	2nd place, silver medalist(s)
2022	Tirana, Albania	89 kg	167	~~171~~	171	4	~~198~~	198	~~202~~	4	369	3rd place, bronze medalist(s)
2025	Chișinău, Moldova	96 kg	167	171	174	2nd place, silver medalist(s)	201	205	~~208~~	2nd place, silver medalist(s)	379	2nd place, silver medalist(s)
