= 2018 World Weightlifting Championships – Men's 89 kg =

The men's 89 kilograms competition at the 2018 World Weightlifting Championships was held on 6 November 2018.

== Schedule ==
Date	Time	Event
6 November 2018	10:00	Group C
6 November 2018	14:25	Group B
6 November 2018	19:55	Group A

== Medalists ==
Event	Gold		Silver		Bronze	
Snatch	Arley Méndez (CHI)	169 kg	Pavel Khadasevich (BLR)	169 kg	Jhor Moreno (COL)	168 kg
Clean & Jerk	Artem Okulov (RUS)	206 kg	Hakob Mkrtchyan (ARM)	205 kg	Keydomar Vallenilla (VEN)	204 kg
Total	Artem Okulov (RUS)	372 kg	Pavel Khadasevich (BLR)	371 kg	Revaz Davitadze (GEO)	371 kg

== Records ==
Prior to this competition, the existing world records were as follows.

World Record	Snatch	World Standard	179 kg	—	1 November 2018
World Record	Clean & Jerk	World Standard	216 kg	—	1 November 2018
World Record	Total	World Standard	387 kg	—	1 November 2018

== Results ==
Rank	Athlete	Group	Snatch (kg)				Clean & Jerk (kg)				Total
Rank	Athlete	Group	1	2	3	Rank	1	2	3	Rank	Total
1st place, gold medalist(s)	Artem Okulov (RUS)	A	161	166	~~168~~	7	202	206	~~210~~	1st place, gold medalist(s)	372
2nd place, silver medalist(s)	Pavel Khadasevich (BLR)	A	163	~~168~~	169	2nd place, silver medalist(s)	194	198	202	6	371
3rd place, bronze medalist(s)	Revaz Davitadze (GEO)	A	163	~~167~~	168 JWR	4	~~194~~	194	203 JWR	5	371 JWR
4	Brayan Rodallegas (COL)	B	~~160~~	160	167	5	193	196	203	4	370
5	Arley Méndez (CHI)	A	160	~~168~~	169	1st place, gold medalist(s)	190	200	~~210~~	7	369
6	Keydomar Vallenilla (VEN)	A	160	165	~~167~~	9	195	201 JWR	204 JWR	3rd place, bronze medalist(s)	369
7	Hakob Mkrtchyan (ARM)	A	~~160~~	160	~~168~~	13	205	~~213~~	~~213~~	2nd place, silver medalist(s)	365
8	Jhor Moreno (COL)	A	160	165	168	3rd place, bronze medalist(s)	~~195~~	195	~~200~~	13	363
9	Toshiki Yamamoto (JPN)	B	155	160	163	10	190	199	~~208~~	8	362
10	Jang Yeon-hak (KOR)	B	161	164	166	6	~~190~~	190	195	12	361
11	Raad Ameen (IRQ)	A	153	160	~~163~~	12	193	~~198~~	198	9	358
12	Aref Khaki (IRI)	B	150	155	158	14	~~188~~	190	195	11	353
13	Krenar Shoraj (ALB)	B	153	156	~~161~~	17	192	197	~~200~~	10	353
14	Denis Ulanov (KAZ)	B	155	160	—	11	~~192~~	192	~~200~~	15	352
15	Sunnatilla Usarov (UZB)	B	155	160	165	8	~~185~~	185	~~190~~	20	350
16	Jordan Cantrell (USA)	B	~~155~~	155	~~160~~	19	185	190	~~194~~	17	345
17	Zacarías Bonnat (DOM)	B	153	~~158~~	~~161~~	21	~~192~~	192	~~198~~	14	345
18	Georgy Sidakov (RUS)	C	149	154	157	15	177	185	~~191~~	18	342
19	Paweł Kulik (POL)	B	146	150	~~153~~	23	185	190	~~193~~	16	340
20	Zaynobiddin Makhamadaminov (UZB)	C	150	~~155~~	156	16	170	175	~~180~~	25	331
21	Banyat Tawnok (THA)	C	147	152	155	18	170	175	~~180~~	24	330
22	Don Opeloge (SAM)	C	142	~~147~~	~~147~~	24	180	185	~~190~~	19	327
23	David Samayoa (CAN)	C	146	150	~~153~~	22	176	~~180~~	~~180~~	23	326
24	Alexander Hernández (PUR)	C	~~140~~	140	~~145~~	26	175	~~180~~	181	21	321
25	Tudor Ciobanu (MDA)	C	140	~~146~~	~~146~~	25	180	~~185~~	~~185~~	22	320
26	Adolfo Fernández (MEX)	C	135	139	~~142~~	27	155	160	165	26	304
27	Tarmenkhan Babayev (AZE)	C	130	135	—	28	160	~~165~~	—	27	295
—	Ahmed Sayed Ali (EGY)	A	155	~~160~~	~~161~~	20	—	—	—	—	—
DQ	Irmantas Kačinskas (LTU)	C	143	148	~~152~~	—	170	174	~~179~~	—	—
DQ	Maksim Mudreuski (BLR)	A	161	167	~~169~~	—	~~193~~	~~193~~	—	—	—
