= Pavel Khadasevich =

Belarusian weightlifter (born 1993)

Personal information
- Nationality: Belarusian
- Born: 16 July 1993 (age 32)
- Height: 1.73 m (5 ft 8 in)
- Weight: 88.51 kg (195 lb)

Sport
- Country: Belarus
- Sport: Weightlifting
- Event: –89 kg
Medal record
Men's weightlifting
Representing Belarus
World Championships
Silver medal – second place	2018 Ashgabat	–89 kg
Representing Individual Neutral Athletes
European Championships
Bronze medal – third place	2024 Sofia	–96 kg

Pavel Khadasevich (born 16 July 1993) is a Belarusian Olympic weightlifter and Olympian competing in the 85 kg category until 2018 and 89 kg starting in 2018 after the International Weightlifting Federation reorganized the categories.

== Career ==
He competed at the 2016 Summer Olympics in the 85 kg category, originally finishing 7th, but was upgraded to 6th after the original bronze medalist Gabriel Sîncrăian failed a drug test in October of that year.

== Major results ==
Year	Venue	Weight	Snatch (kg)				Clean & Jerk (kg)				Total	Rank
Year	Venue	Weight	1	2	3	Rank	1	2	3	Rank	Total	Rank
Olympic Games
2016	Rio de Janeiro, Brazil	85 kg	166	170	~~173~~	6	195	~~201~~	~~201~~	9	365	6
World Championships
2014	Almaty, Kazakhstan	85 kg	161	166	169	7	~~196~~	196	200	9	369	7
2018	Ashgabat, Turkmenistan	89 kg	163	~~168~~	169	2nd place, silver medalist(s)	194	198	202	6	371	2nd place, silver medalist(s)
European Championships
2017	Split, Croatia	85 kg	160	~~164~~	~~164~~	3rd place, bronze medalist(s)	185	191	196	5	356	4
