= Majid Askari =

Iranian weightlifter (born 1991)

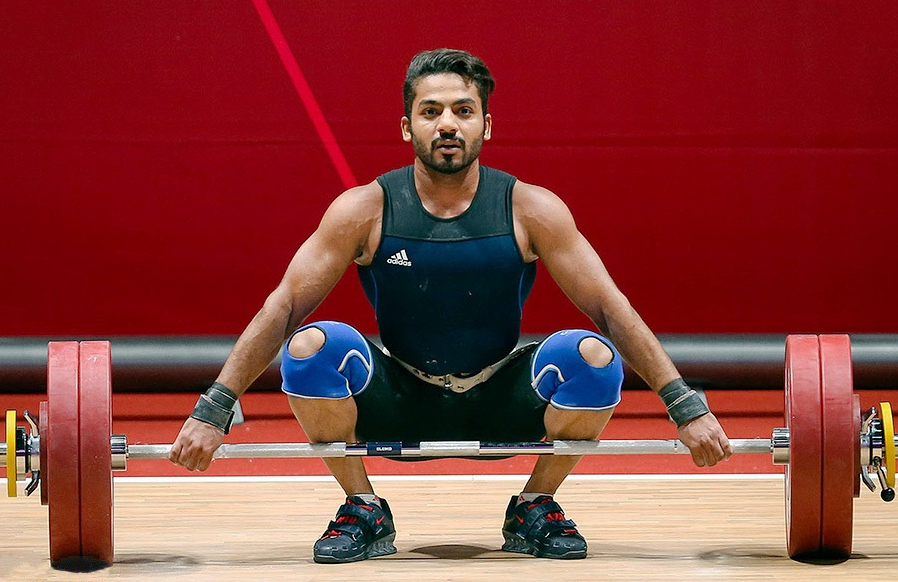
- Askari at the 2018 Asian Games

Personal information
- Native name: مجید عسکری
- Nationality: Iranian
- Born: 8 November 1991 (age 34)
- Education: Islamic Azad University

Sport
- Country: Iran
- Sport: Weightlifting
- Event: 69 kg
- Coached by: Ebrahim davari

Achievements and titles
- Personal bests: Snatch: 139 kg (2017); Clean and jerk: 177 kg (2017); Total: 316 kg (2017)
Medal record
Representing Iran
Asian Championships
Silver medal – second place	2011 Tongling	56 kg
Bronze medal – third place	2015 Phuket	62 kg
Islamic Solidarity Games
Silver medal – second place	2017 Baku	69 kg
World Junior Championships
Silver medal – second place	2011 Malaysia	56 kg

Majid Askari (Arabic: مجید عسکری; born 8 November 1991) is an Iranian weightlifter. He won a silver and a bronze medal at the 2011 and 2015 Asian championships, respectively.

== Personal records ==
Discipline	Result (kg)	Location	Competition	Record	Date
56 kg
Snatch	124	(South Korea) Incheon	2014 Asian Game	National Record	20 September 2014
Clean & Jerk	150	(Malaysia) Penang	World Junior Championship	National Record	30 June 2011
Total	273	(Malaysia) Penang	World Junior Championship	National Record	30 June 2011
62 kg
Snatch	130	(Thailand) Phuket	2015 Asian Weightlifting Championships		7 September 2015
Clean & Jerk	166	(Thailand) Phuket	2015 Asian Weightlifting Championships	National Record	7 September 2015
Total	296	(Thailand) Phuket	2015 Asian Weightlifting Championships		7 September 2015
69 kg
Snatch	139	(Azerbaijan) Baku	Islamic Solidarity Games		17 May 2017
Clean & Jerk	177	(Azerbaijan) Baku	Islamic Solidarity Games		17 May 2017
Total	316	(Azerbaijan) Baku	Islamic Solidarity Games		17 May 2017

== Major results ==
Year	Venue	Weight	Snatch (kg)				Clean & Jerk (kg)				Total	Rank
Year	Venue	Weight	1	2	3	Rank	1	2	3	Rank	Total	Rank
World Championships
2013	Wrocław, Poland	62 kg	128	~~132~~	~~133~~	7	160	~~165~~	~~165~~	5	288	6
2014	Almaty, Kazakhstan	56 kg	~~117~~	117	~~121~~	11	144	~~151~~	~~151~~	13	261	12
2015	Houston, United States	62 kg	122	~~127~~	~~128~~	24	~~152~~	152	~~162~~	22	274	24
Asian Games
2014	Incheon, South Korea	56 kg	118	123	124	5	~~146~~	~~146~~	146	7	270	6
2018	Jakarta, Indonesia	69kg	~~133~~	~~135~~	~~135~~	--	--	--	--	--	--	--
Asian Championships
2011	Tongling, China	56 kg	~~115~~	115	~~120~~	2nd place, silver medalist(s)	140	~~148~~	~~150~~	2nd place, silver medalist(s)	255	2nd place, silver medalist(s)
2012	Pyeongtaek, South Korea	62 kg	123	127	~~130~~	5	~~161~~	~~161~~	~~162~~	--	--	--
2015	Phuket, Thailand	62 kg	125	130	~~134~~	2nd place, silver medalist(s)	158	~~164~~	166	3rd place, bronze medalist(s)	296	3rd place, bronze medalist(s)
2022	Manama, Bahrain	61 kg	110	~~117~~	117	6	126	132	~~140~~	12	249	11
Summer Universiade
2013	Kazan, Russia	62 kg	117	121	~~125~~	4	145	~~150~~	~~150~~	7	266	7
Islamic Solidarity Games
2017	Baku, Azerbaijan	69 kg	131	136	139	5	170	177	~~185~~	1	316	2nd place, silver medalist(s)
World Junior Championships
2011	Penang, Malaysia	56 kg	116	121	123	2nd place, silver medalist(s)	146	150	~~155~~	4	273	2nd place, silver medalist(s)
