= Yeimar Mendoza =

Colombian weightlifter

Personal information
- Full name: Yeimar Mendoza Carabalí
- Born: September 2, 1996 (age 29)

Sport
- Country: Colombia
- Sport: Weightlifting
- Events: 89 kg; 96 kg; 102 kg; 109 kg
Medal record
Representing Colombia
Men's weightlifting
Pan American Championships
Gold medal – first place	2024 Caracas	109 kg
Silver medal – second place	2022 Bogotá	102 kg
Bronze medal – third place	2020 Santo Domingo	89 kg
Bolivarian Games
Gold medal – first place	2022 Valledupar	102 kg S
Gold medal – first place	2022 Valledupar	102 kg CJ

Yeimar Mendoza Carabalí (born 2 September 1996) is a Colombian weightlifter. He is a two-time gold medalist at the Bolivarian Games and a three-time medalist, including gold, at the Pan American Weightlifting Championships.

== Career ==
Mendoza won the gold medal in the men's 102 kg Snatch and Clean & Jerk events at the 2022 Bolivarian Games held in Valledupar, Colombia.

He won the silver medal in the men's 102 kg event at the 2022 Pan American Weightlifting Championships held in Bogotá, Colombia. In 2024, he won the gold medal in the men's 109 kg event at the Pan American Weightlifting Championships held in Caracas, Venezuela.

== Achievements ==
Year	Venue	Weight	Snatch (kg)				Clean & Jerk (kg)				Total	Rank
Year	Venue	Weight	1	2	3	Rank	1	2	3	Rank	Total	Rank
Representing Colombia
World Championships
2022	Bogotá, Colombia	96 kg	~~166~~	166	~~171~~	5	200	~~205~~	~~206~~	9	366	7
2023	Riyadh, Saudi Arabia	109 kg	~~166~~	166	170	10	202	207	~~211~~	9	377	9
2024	Manama, Bahrain	96 kg	~~160~~	~~160~~	160	17	190	195	201	11	361	12
Pan American Championships
2020	Santo Domingo, Dominican Republic	89 kg	152	~~157~~	157	3rd place, bronze medalist(s)	184	190	~~196~~	3rd place, bronze medalist(s)	347	3rd place, bronze medalist(s)
2022	Bogotá, Colombia	102 kg	162	167	~~169~~	2nd place, silver medalist(s)	195	198	201	2nd place, silver medalist(s)	368	2nd place, silver medalist(s)
2024	Caracas, Venezuela	109 kg	140	150	152	1st place, gold medalist(s)	190	—	—	1st place, gold medalist(s)	342	1st place, gold medalist(s)
Bolivarian Games
2022	Valledupar, Colombia	102 kg	155	~~162~~	162	1st place, gold medalist(s)	190	195	197	1st place, gold medalist(s)	—N/a	—N/a
