= Ali Miri =

Iranian weightlifter (born 1995)

Personal information
- Nationality: Iranian
- Born: 1 August 1995 (age 30)
- Weight: 88.95 kg (196 lb)

Sport
- Country: Iran
- Sport: Weightlifting
- Event: –89 kg
- Club: Ardabil, Azerbaijan Weightlifting Team

Achievements and titles
- Personal bests: Snatch: 167 kg (2019); Clean and jerk: 207 kg (2019); Total: 374 kg (2019)
Medal record
Men's weightlifting
Representing Iran
World Championships
Silver medal – second place	2019 Pattaya	–89 kg
Asian Championships
Silver medal – second place	2019 Ningbo	–89 kg

Ali Miri (Persian: علی میری; born 1 August 1995) is an Iranian weightlifter who won a silver medal at the 2019 Ningbo Asian championship.

== Major results ==
Year	Venue	Weight	Snatch (kg)				Clean & Jerk (kg)				Total	Rank
Year	Venue	Weight	1	2	3	Rank	1	2	3	Rank	Total	Rank
World Championships
2017	Anaheim, United States	85 kg	~~155~~	~~155~~	155	7	193	~~201~~	~~201~~	6	348	7
2019	Pattaya, Thailand	89 kg	160	165	167	5	202	207	~~210~~	3rd place, bronze medalist(s)	374	2nd place, silver medalist(s)
Asian Championships
2015	Phuket, Thailand	77 kg	~~152~~	152	~~156~~	6	178	~~186~~	~~187~~	8	330	7
2016	Tashkent, Uzbekistan	77 kg	146	151	~~156~~	5	~~180~~	~~180~~	~~180~~	--	--	--
2019	Ningbo, China	89 kg	~~155~~	155	161	3rd place, bronze medalist(s)	195	200	205	2nd place, silver medalist(s)	366	2nd place, silver medalist(s)
World Junior Championships
2015	Wrocław, Poland	77 kg	147	150	~~154~~	2nd place, silver medalist(s)	178	182	~~190~~	1st place, gold medalist(s)	332	2nd place, silver medalist(s)
