= Jhor Moreno =

Colombian weightlifter (born 1995)

Personal information
- Born: 2 October 1995 (age 30) Apartadó, Colombia

Sport
- Country: Colombia
- Sport: Weightlifting
Medal record
Men's weightlifting
Representing Colombia
World Championships
Bronze medal – third place	2022 Bogotá	96 kg
Pan American Games
Bronze medal – third place	2015 Toronto	77 kg
Pan American Championships
Gold medal – first place	2021 Guayaquil	89 kg
Gold medal – first place	2022 Bogotá	102 kg
Silver medal – second place	2017 Miami	85 kg
Central American and Caribbean Games
Silver medal – second place	2023 San Salvador	96 kg S
Silver medal – second place	2023 San Salvador	96 kg CJ
Bolivarian Games
Gold medal – first place	2022 Valledupar	96 kg S
Silver medal – second place	2022 Valledupar	96 kg CJ

Jhor Esneider Moreno Torres (born 2 October 1995) is a Colombian weightlifter. He won the bronze medal in the men's 96 kg event at the 2022 World Weightlifting Championships held in Bogotá, Colombia. He also won the bronze medal in the men's 77 kg event at the 2015 Pan American Games held in Toronto, Canada. He is also a two-time gold medalist at the Pan American Weightlifting Championships (2021 and 2022).

== Career ==
Moreno won the silver medal in his event at the 2017 Pan American Weightlifting Championships held in Miami, United States. In that same year, he competed in the men's 85 kg event at the World Weightlifting Championships held in Anaheim, California, United States. Moreno won the bronze medal in the Snatch in the men's 89 kg event at the 2018 World Weightlifting Championships held in Ashgabat, Turkmenistan.

Moreno won the gold medal in his event at the 2021 Pan American Weightlifting Championships held in Guayaquil, Ecuador. A month later, he competed in the men's 89 kg event at the 2021 World Weightlifting Championships held in Tashkent, Uzbekistan.

Moreno won the gold medal in the men's 96 kg Snatch event at the 2022 Bolivarian Games held in Valledupar, Colombia. He also won the silver medal in the men's 96 kg Clean & Jerk event. He won the gold medal in the men's 102 kg event at the 2022 Pan American Weightlifting Championships held in Bogotá, Colombia.

== Achievements ==
Year	Venue	Weight	Snatch (kg)				Clean & Jerk (kg)				Total	Rank
Year	Venue	Weight	1	2	3	Rank	1	2	3	Rank	Total	Rank
Representing Colombia
World Championships
2017	Anaheim, United States	85 kg	152	~~156~~	~~156~~	10	~~190~~	~~190~~	~~190~~	—	—	—
2018	Ashgabat, Turkmenistan	89 kg	160	165	168	3rd place, bronze medalist(s)	~~195~~	195	~~200~~	13	363	8
2021	Tashkent, Uzbekistan	89 kg	157	~~162~~	162	9	195	~~200~~	—	11	357	9
2022	Bogotá, Colombia	96 kg	165	171	~~174~~	3rd place, bronze medalist(s)	200	205	209	3rd place, bronze medalist(s)	380	3rd place, bronze medalist(s)
2023	Riyadh, Saudi Arabia	96 kg	165	170	~~173~~	6	201	~~205~~	~~205~~	10	371	8
Pan American Games
2015	Toronto, Canada	77 kg	142	146	~~150~~	—N/a	178	182	~~193~~	—N/a	328	3rd place, bronze medalist(s)
Pan American Championships
2017	Miami, United States	85 kg	153	157	160	1st place, gold medalist(s)	192	196	200	2nd place, silver medalist(s)	360	2nd place, silver medalist(s)
2021	Guayaquil, Ecuador	89 kg	157	161	165	1st place, gold medalist(s)	190	197	~~201~~	2nd place, silver medalist(s)	362	1st place, gold medalist(s)
2022	Bogotá, Colombia	102 kg	~~165~~	165	168	1st place, gold medalist(s)	196	200	202	1st place, gold medalist(s)	370	1st place, gold medalist(s)
Central American and Caribbean Games
2023	San Salvador, El Salvador	96 kg	165	~~170~~	~~171~~	2nd place, silver medalist(s)	200	206	—	2nd place, silver medalist(s)	—N/a	—N/a
Bolivarian Games
2022	Valledupar, Colombia	96 kg	165	~~170~~	170	1st place, gold medalist(s)	195	202	~~207~~	2nd place, silver medalist(s)	—N/a	—N/a
