= 2019 World Weightlifting Championships – Men's 55 kg =

The men's 55 kg competition at the 2019 World Weightlifting Championships was held on 18 September 2019.

== Schedule ==
Date	Time	Event
18 September 2019	12:00	Group B
18 September 2019	17:55	Group A

== Medalists ==
Event	Gold		Silver		Bronze	
Snatch	Om Yun-chol (PRK)	128 kg	Nguyễn Trần Anh Tuấn (VIE)	120 kg	Igor Son (KAZ)	120 kg
Clean & Jerk	Om Yun-chol (PRK)	166 kg	Hafez Ghashghaei (IRI)	149 kg	Mansour Al-Saleem (KSA)	147 kg
Total	Om Yun-chol (PRK)	294 kg	Igor Son (KAZ)	266 kg	Mansour Al-Saleem (KSA)	265 kg

== Records ==
Prior to this competition, the existing world records were as follows.

World Record	Snatch	World Standard	135 kg	—	1 November 2018
World Record	Clean & Jerk	Om Yun-chol (PRK)	162 kg	Ashgabat, Turkmenistan	2 November 2018
World Record	Total	World Standard	293 kg	—	1 November 2018

== Results ==
Rank	Athlete	Group	Snatch (kg)				Clean & Jerk (kg)				Total
Rank	Athlete	Group	1	2	3	Rank	1	2	3	Rank	Total
1st place, gold medalist(s)	Om Yun-chol (PRK)	A	121	126	128	1st place, gold medalist(s)	155	~~163~~	166 CWR	1st place, gold medalist(s)	294 CWR
2nd place, silver medalist(s)	Igor Son (KAZ)	A	115	~~119~~	120	3rd place, bronze medalist(s)	142	146	~~157~~	4	266
3rd place, bronze medalist(s)	Mansour Al-Saleem (KSA)	A	~~118~~	118	~~121~~	6	140	~~147~~	147	3rd place, bronze medalist(s)	265
4	Nguyễn Trần Anh Tuấn (VIE)	A	115	~~119~~	120	2nd place, silver medalist(s)	~~142~~	143	~~147~~	7	263
5	Arli Chontey (KAZ)	A	115	118	~~120~~	5	138	143	145	6	263
6	John Ceniza (PHI)	A	110	115	117	7	145	~~148~~	~~148~~	5	262
7	Hafez Ghashghaei (IRI)	A	111	~~116~~	~~116~~	9	140	149	~~155~~	2nd place, silver medalist(s)	260
8	Surahmat Wijoyo (INA)	B	106	111	~~114~~	8	~~139~~	139	~~145~~	8	250
9	Sergio Massidda (ITA)	B	105	109	~~112~~	11	~~130~~	130	135	9	244
10	Dilanka Isuru Kumara (SRI)	B	100	105	108	12	~~130~~	134	~~138~~	10	242
11	Daniel Lungu (MDA)	B	105	~~110~~	110	10	~~125~~	125	~~130~~	11	235
—	Lại Gia Thành (VIE)	A	116	119	~~121~~	4	~~141~~	~~141~~	~~142~~	—	—

== New records ==
Clean & Jerk	166 kg	Om Yun-chol (PRK)	WR
Total	294 kg	Om Yun-chol (PRK)	WR
