= Nurgissa Adiletuly =

Kazakhstani weightlifter (born 2000)

Nurğisa Ädıletūly
Personal information
- Nationality: Kazakhstan
- Born: 9 October 2000 (age 26) Shymkent, Kazakhstan
- Weight: 94 kg (207 lb)

Sport
- Sport: Weightlifting
- Weight class: 94 kg
Medal record
Men's weightlifting
Representing Kazakhstan
World Championships
Gold medal – first place	2024 Manama	96 kg
Silver medal – second place	2022 Bogotá	96 kg
Silver medal – second place	2026 Ningbo	95 kg
Asian Games
Silver medal – second place	2026 Aichi–Nagoya	95 kg
Asian Championships
Silver medal – second place	2020 Tashkent	89 kg
Islamic Solidarity Games
Gold medal – first place	2025 Riyadh	94 kg S
Gold medal – first place	2025 Riyadh	94 kg C
Gold medal – first place	2025 Riyadh	94 kg T

Nurğisa Ädıletūly (Note: Often transliterated as Nurgissa Adiletuly through a Russified Romanization of Нургиса Адилетулы.) (Kazakh: Нұрғиса Әділетұлы, born 9 October 2000) is a Kazakhstani weightlifter. He is the 2024 World Champion in the men's 96 kg category, silver medalist at the 2022 World Weightlifting Championships and a medalist at the Asian Weightlifting Championships.

== Career ==
Nurğisa first came to prominence in 2019 when he finished fourth at the Junior World Weightlifting Championships and won a silver medal at the Asian Junior Weightlifting Championships. The following year, he claimed the Asian Junior title.

In October 2022, Nurğisa placed fourth at the 2022 Asian Weightlifting Championships in the 96 kg category with a total of 376 kg. Later that year, at the 2022 World Weightlifting Championships in Bogotá, Colombia, he won the silver medal in the 96 kg event with a total of 383 kg.

In May 2023, Nurğisa initially won a gold medal at the 2023 Asian Weightlifting Championships in Jinju, South Korea, but was later disqualified and stripped of his title. In July 2023, Nurğisa alonsgide several other weightlifters from the Kazakhstan's team were tested positive for banned substances, thus getting suspended from competing at the 2024 Olympics.

In December 2024, at the 2024 World Weightlifting Championships held in Manama, Bahrain, he became world champion in the men's 96 kg category with a total lift of 388 kg. He also took a small silver medal in the clean & jerk, lifting 214 kg.

At the 2026 Asian Games, he won a silver medal in the men's 95 kg category with a total lift of 394 kg.

== Major results ==
Year	Venue	Weight	Snatch (kg)				Clean & Jerk (kg)				Total	Rank
Year	Venue	Weight	1	2	3	Rank	1	2	3	Rank	Total	Rank
World Championships
2022	Bogotá, Colombia	96 kg	170	~~174~~	174	2	205	~~209~~	209	4	383	Silver
2024	Manama, Bahrain	96 kg	170	174	~~177~~	4	206	212	214	2	388	Gold
Asian Games
2026	Nagoya, Japan	95 kg	~~177~~	177	~~181~~	3	210	217	~~222~~	2	394	Silver
Asian Championships
2020	Tashkent, Uzbekistan	89 kg	164	169	~~172~~	1	197	203	~~207~~	3	372	Silver
2022	Manama, Bahrain	96 kg	167	172	~~176~~	3	198	204	~~212~~	4	376	4
2023	Jinju, South Korea	102 kg	~~173~~	~~178~~	~~181~~	—	~~210~~	~~215~~	~~219~~	—	~~400~~	DSQ
World Junior Championships
2019	Suva, Fiji	89 kg	150	155	~~158~~	3	~~180~~	180	~~187~~	4	335	4
Asian Junior Championships
2019	Pyongyang, North Korea	89 kg	155	160	163	1	185	191	194	3	357	Silver
2020	Tashkent, Uzbekistan	89 kg	155	160	165	1	185	190	195	1	360	Gold
