= Kyle Micallef (weightlifter) =

Maltese weightlifter (born 1987)

Kyle Micallef (born January 8, 1987) is a Maltese weightlifter. He competed in the men's 85 kg event at the 2016 Summer Olympics but did not finish.
