= Denis Ulanov =

Kazakhstani weightlifter (born 1993)

Personal information
- Native name: Денис Александрович Уланов
- Nationality: Kazakh
- Born: 28 October 1993 (age 32) Zyryanovsk, Kazakhstan
- Height: 1.75 m (5 ft 9 in)
- Weight: 85 kg (187 lb)

Sport
- Country: Kazakhstan
- Sport: Olympic Weightlifting
- Event: 85 kg
- Coached by: Aleksandr Devyatkin

Achievements and titles
- Personal bests: Snatch: 175 kg (2016); Clean and jerk: 215 kg (2016); Total: 390 kg (2016)
Medal record
Representing Kazakhstan
Men's weightlifting
Olympic Games
Bronze medal – third place	2016 Rio de Janeiro	— 85 kg
Asian Championships
Gold medal – first place	2016 Tashkent	— 85 kg
Bronze medal – third place	2019 Ningbo	— 81 kg
Summer Universiade
Gold medal – first place	2017 Taipei	— 85 kg
- Updated on 23 August 2017

Denis Aleksandrovich Ulanov (born 28 October 1993) is a Kazakh Olympic weightlifter. He represented his country at the 2016 Summer Olympics, where he won the bronze medal.

== Career ==
In the Men's 85 kg Weightlifting competition at the 2016 Summer Olympics in Rio de Janeiro, Brazil winning the bronze medal. He initially finished fourth behind Gabriel Sîncrăian of Romania, who was later on October 13, 2016, the IWF reported that bronze medalist Gabriel Sîncrăian had tested positive for excess testosterone in a test connected to the Rio Olympics.

Denis participated in the men's 85 kg class at 2016 Asian Weightlifting Championships in Tashkent, Uzbekistan. He won gold - snatched 168 kg and jerked an additional 205 kg for a total of 373 kg.

Ulanov won a gold medal at the 2017 Summer Universiade in Taipei, snatching 165 kg and clean and jerking 200 kg, setting 365 kg for a total.

== Major results ==
Year	Venue	Weight	Snatch (kg)				Clean & Jerk (kg)				Total	Rank
Year	Venue	Weight	1	2	3	Rank	1	2	3	Rank	Total	Rank
Olympic Games
2016	Rio de Janeiro, Brazil	85 kg	170	~~175~~	175	4	~~215~~	~~215~~	215	3	390	3rd place, bronze medalist(s)
World Championships
2018	Tashkent, Turkmenistan	89 kg	155	160	-	12	~~192~~	192	~~200~~	15	352	14
Asian Championships
2019	Ningbo, China	81 kg	151	156	160	3rd place, bronze medalist(s)	190	~~196~~	196	3rd place, bronze medalist(s)	356	3rd place, bronze medalist(s)
2016	Tashkent, Uzbekistan	77 kg	160	165	168	1st place, gold medalist(s)	200	~~205~~	205	1st place, gold medalist(s)	373	1st place, gold medalist(s)
Summer Universiade
2017	New Taipei, Taiwan	85 kg	165	~~170~~	~~170~~	2	~~200~~	200	~~221~~	1	365	1st place, gold medalist(s)

== Doping sanction ==
In September 2013 Ulanov won the Asian Junior Cup in Pyongyang, after the competition he had produce positive doping test. He used Stanozolol and he was banned between 17.10.2013 - 17.10.2015.
