= Ali Alipour (weightlifter) =

Iranian weightlifter (born 2003)

Personal information
- Native name: علی عالی پور
- Born: 26 November 2003 (age 22)

Sport
- Country: Iran
- Sport: Weightlifting
- Weight class: 95 kg
Medal record
Men's weightlifting
Representing Iran
World Championships
Bronze medal – third place	2024 Manama	96 kg
Bronze medal – third place	2026 Ningbo	95 kg
Asian Games
Gold medal – first place	2026 Aichi–Nagoya	95 kg
Asian Championships
Gold medal – first place	2024 Tashkent	89 kg
Gold medal – first place	2025 Jiangshan	96 kg

Ali Alipour (Persian: علی عالی پور; born 26 November 2003), is an Iranian weightlifter. He is a two-time Asian Weightlifting Championships gold medalist and world record holder.

== Career ==
In February 2024, Alipour competed at the 2024 Asian Weightlifting Championships and won a gold medal in the 89 kg event with a total lift of 363 kg. In December 2024, he competed at the 2024 World Weightlifting Championships and won a bronze medal in the 96 kg with a total lift of 387 kg.

In May 2025, he competed at the 2025 Asian Weightlifting Championships and won a gold medal in the 96 kg event with total lift of 390 kg. In October 2025, he competed at the 2025 World Weightlifting Championships and finished in fourth place in the 94 kg event. He won a silver medal in the snatch with a lift of 176 kg.

In September 2026, he competed at the 2026 Asian Games and won a gold medal in the 95 kg event. He opened the event with 180 kg in the snatch, setting both an Asian Games record and Asian record. He followed it up with 218 kg in the clean and jerk, before finishing with a total lift of 398 kg. His 398 kg total was a world record.
