= Toshiki Yamamoto =

Japanese weightlifter (born 1991)

Personal information
- Nationality: Japanese
- Born: 8 September 1991 (age 34)
- Education: Nippon Sport Science University
- Weight: 88.85 kg (195.9 lb)

Sport
- Country: Japan
- Sport: Weightlifting
- Team: ALSOK
- Coached by: Masaharu Yamada

Achievements and titles
- Personal bests: Snatch: 163 kg (2018); Clean & Jerk: 208 kg (2019); Clean & Jerk: 215 kg (All Japan Championship 2020); Total: 368 kg (2019)
Medal record
Asian Championships
Bronze medal – third place	2017 Ashgabat	85 kg
Bronze medal – third place	2019 Ningbo	89 kg

Toshiki Yamamoto (山本俊樹; born 8 September 1991) is a Japanese weightlifter, competing in the 85 kg category until 2018 and 96 kg starting in 2018 after the International Weightlifting Federation reorganized the categories.

== Career ==
He competed at the 2018 World Weightlifting Championships finishing ninth overall in the 89 kg division. At the 2019 World Weightlifting Championships he finished fifth overall in the same category.

== Major results ==
Year	Venue	Weight	Snatch (kg)				Clean & Jerk (kg)				Total	Rank
Year	Venue	Weight	1	2	3	Rank	1	2	3	Rank	Total	Rank
Representing Japan
World Championships
2013	Wrocław, Poland	77 kg	~~140~~	~~140~~	~~140~~	--	168	~~173~~	~~177~~	15	--	--
2017	Anaheim, United States	85 kg	148	~~153~~	~~153~~	14	~~192~~	193	~~202~~	7	341	10
2018	Ashgabat, Turkmenistan	89 kg	155	160	163	11	190	199	~~208~~	8	362	9
2019	Pattaya, Thailand	89 kg	155	~~160~~	160	13	193	200	208	1st place, gold medalist(s)	368	5
Asian Games
2018	Jakarta, Indonesia	85 kg	145	151	155	6	191	~~198~~	~~198~~	3	346	4
Asian Championships
2017	Ashgabat, Turkmenistan	85 kg	145	~~152~~	152	7	185	192	199	1st place, gold medalist(s)	351	3rd place, bronze medalist(s)
2019	Ningbo, China	89 kg	155	~~160~~	~~160~~	5	195	~~203~~	203	3rd place, bronze medalist(s)	358	3rd place, bronze medalist(s)
2020	Tashkent, Uzbekistan	96 kg	160	165	~~170~~	5	201	205	~~217~~	3rd place, bronze medalist(s)	370	4
