= Hafez Ghashghaei =

Iranian weightlifter

Personal information
- Citizenship: Iranian
- Born: 16 March 1995 (age 31)

Sport
- Country: Iran
- Sport: Weightlifting
- Weight class: 67 kg
Medal record
Men's weightlifting
Representing Iran
Islamic Solidarity Games
Bronze medal – third place	2021 Konya	67 kg C

Hafez Ghashghaei (Persian: حافظ قشقایی; born 16 March 1995) is an Iranian weightlifter. He represented Iran at the 2019 World Weightlifting Championships and won the clean and jerk silver medal in the 55 kg category.

== Major results ==
Year	Venue	Weight	Snatch (kg)				Clean & Jerk (kg)				Total	Rank
Year	Venue	Weight	1	2	3	Rank	1	2	3	Rank	Total	Rank
World Championships
2019	Pattaya, Thailand	55 kg	111	~~116~~	~~116~~	9	140	149	~~155~~	2nd place, silver medalist(s)	260	7
2022	Bogotá, Colombia	67 kg	~~126~~	~~126~~	126	11	165	~~173~~	~~173~~	19	291	16
Islamic Solidarity Games
2022	Konya, Turkey	67 kg	-	-	-	9	-	-	-	3rd place, bronze medalist(s)	299	5
