= Weightlifting at the 2026 Asian Games – Women's 77 kg =

Women's 77 kg at the 2026 Asian Games
- Venue: Nagoya Trade & Industry Center
- Date: 27 September 2026
- Competitors: 5 from 5 nations

Medalists
gold medal	He Renxiu	China
silver medal	Ayanat Zhumagali	Kazakhstan
bronze medal	Reihaneh Karimi	Iran

The women's 77 kilograms competition at the 2026 Asian Games was held on 27 September 2026 at the Nagoya Trade & Industry Center.

== Schedule ==
All times are Japan Standard Time (UTC+09:00)

Date	Time	Event
Sunday, 27 September 2026	17:00	Group A

== Records ==
Prior to this competition, the existing world, Asian and Games records were as follows.

World Record	Snatch	Olivia Reeves (USA)	123 kg	Førde, Norway	8 October 2025
World Record	Clean & Jerk	Olivia Reeves (USA)	155 kg	Førde, Norway	8 October 2025
World Record	Total	Olivia Reeves (USA)	278 kg	Førde, Norway	8 October 2025
Asian Record	Snatch	Asian Standard	122 kg	—	1 June 2025
Asian Record	Clean & Jerk	Asian Standard	153 kg	—	1 June 2025
Asian Record	Total	Asian Standard	273 kg	—	1 June 2025
Games Record	Snatch	Asian Games Standard	120 kg	—	1 August 2026
Games Record	Clean & Jerk	Asian Games Standard	150 kg	—	1 August 2026
Games Record	Total	Asian Games Standard	268 kg	—	1 August 2026

== Results ==
Rank	Athlete	Group	Snatch (kg)				Clean & Jerk (kg)				Total
Rank	Athlete	Group	1	2	3	Result	1	2	3	Result	Total
1st place, gold medalist(s)	He Renxiu (CHN)	A	111	115	118	118	134	~~140~~	140	140	258
2nd place, silver medalist(s)	Ayanat Zhumagali (KAZ)	A	103	106	109	109	130	133	137	137	246
3rd place, bronze medalist(s)	Reihaneh Karimi (IRI)	A	~~103~~	103	107	107	131	136	~~140~~	136	243
4	Kim I-seul (KOR)	A	~~105~~	107	110	110	~~130~~	~~130~~	131	131	241
5	Lkhagvajavyn Bolor-Od (MGL)	A	71	—	—	71	91	96	100	100	171
