= Weightlifting at the 2026 Asian Games – Men's 95 kg =

Men's 95 kg at the 2026 Asian Games
- Venue: Nagoya Trade & Industry Center
- Date: 28 September 2026
- Competitors: 12 from 12 nations

Medalists
gold medal	Ali Alipour	Iran
silver medal	Nurgissa Adiletuly	Kazakhstan
bronze medal	Tu Yi	China

The men's 95 kilograms competition at the 2026 Asian Games was held on 28 September 2026 at the Nagoya Trade & Industry Center.

== Schedule ==
All times are Japan Standard Time (UTC+09:00)

Date	Time	Event
Monday, 28 September 2026	10:00	Group B
Monday, 28 September 2026	17:00	Group A

== Records ==
Prior to this competition, the existing world, Asian and Games records were as follows.

World Record	Snatch	World Standard	181 kg	—	1 August 2026
World Record	Clean & Jerk	World Standard	220 kg	—	1 August 2026
World Record	Total	World Standard	395 kg	—	1 August 2026
Asian Record	Snatch	Asian Standard	179 kg	—	1 August 2026
Asian Record	Clean & Jerk	Asian Standard	220 kg	—	1 August 2026
Asian Record	Total	Asian Standard	392 kg	—	1 August 2026
Games Record	Snatch	Asian Games Standard	177 kg	—	1 August 2026
Games Record	Clean & Jerk	Asian Games Standard	213 kg	—	1 August 2026
Games Record	Total	Asian Games Standard	384 kg	—	1 August 2026

== Results ==
Legend

- NM — No mark

Rank	Athlete	Group	Snatch (kg)				Clean & Jerk (kg)				Total
Rank	Athlete	Group	1	2	3	Result	1	2	3	Result	Total
1st place, gold medalist(s)	Ali Alipour (IRI)	A	175	180	~~183~~	180	213	~~218~~	218	218	398
2nd place, silver medalist(s)	Nurgissa Adiletuly (KAZ)	A	~~177~~	177	~~181~~	177	210	217	~~222~~	217	394
3rd place, bronze medalist(s)	Tu Yi (CHN)	A	170	175	179	179	205	~~215~~	~~215~~	205	384
4	Mukhammadkodir Toshtemirov (UZB)	A	165	170	~~174~~	170	197	203	208	208	378
5	Masashi Nishikawa (JPN)	A	170	~~175~~	~~177~~	170	200	204	207	207	377
6	Syahmi Nor Ghazali (MAS)	B	145	150	153	153	185	~~195~~	200	200	353
7	Fares El-Bakh (QAT)	A	150	—	—	150	190	—	—	190	340
8	Murshid Al-Ajmi (OMA)	B	~~128~~	130	135	135	165	173	180	180	315
9	Matthew Tung (HKG)	B	130	138	~~143~~	138	145	153	~~158~~	153	291
10	Uuganbaataryn Mönkhbayar (MGL)	B	~~123~~	~~123~~	124	124	157	164	~~170~~	164	288
—	Won Jong-beom (KOR)	A	~~170~~	~~170~~	~~170~~	—	—	—	—	—	NM
—	Jokser Albornoz (BRN)	A	~~172~~	~~172~~	~~172~~	—	—	—	—	—	NM

== New records ==
The following records were established during the competition.

Snatch	179	Tu Yi (CHN)	GR
Snatch	180	Ali Alipour (IRI)	AR
Clean & Jerk	217	Nurgissa Adiletuly (KAZ)	GR
Clean & Jerk	218	Ali Alipour (IRI)	GR
Total	387	Nurgissa Adiletuly (KAZ)	GR
Total	393	Ali Alipour (IRI)	AR
Total	394	Nurgissa Adiletuly (KAZ)	AR
Total	398	Ali Alipour (IRI)	WR
