= Hakob Mkrtchyan =

Armenian weightlifter (born 1997)

Personal information
- Nickname: Gomp
- Nationality: Armenian
- Born: 8 March 1997 (age 29)
- Weight: 88.75 kg (196 lb)

Sport
- Country: Armenia
- Sport: Weightlifting
- Event: –89 kg

Achievements and titles
- Personal bests: Snatch: 167 kg (2019); Clean & jerk: 212 kg (2021); Total: 375 kg (2019)
Medal record
World Championships
Gold medal – first place	2019 Pattaya	–89 kg
European Championships
Gold medal – first place	2019 Batumi	–89 kg
Gold medal – first place	2024 Sofia	–96 kg
Bronze medal – third place	2021 Moscow	–96 kg
Youth Olympic Games
Gold medal – first place	2014 Nanjing	–77 kg

Hakob Mkrtchyan (Armenian: Հակոբ Մկրտչյան; born 8 March 1997) is an Armenian male weightlifter, World Champion and European Champion competing in the 77 kg and 85 kg categories until 2018 and 89 kg starting in 2018 after the International Weightlifting Federation reorganized the categories.

== Career ==
He won the 77 kg class at the 2014 Summer Youth Olympics, and in doing so became the first Armenian to win a gold medal at the Summer Youth Olympics.

In 2018 he competed at the 2018 World Weightlifting Championships winning a silver medal in the clean & jerk.

== Major results ==
Year	Venue	Weight	Snatch (kg)				Clean & Jerk (kg)				Total	Rank
Year	Venue	Weight	1	2	3	Rank	1	2	3	Rank	Total	Rank
World Championships
2014	Almaty, Kazakhstan	77 kg	135	~~140~~	140	30	170	175	180	18	320	20
2018	Ashgabat, Turkmenistan	89 kg	~~160~~	160	~~168~~	14	205	~~213~~	~~213~~	2nd place, silver medalist(s)	365	7
2019	Pattaya, Thailand	89 kg	163	167	~~170~~	4	204	208	—	2nd place, silver medalist(s)	375	1st place, gold medalist(s)
European Championships
2019	(Georgia (country)) Batumi, Georgia	89 kg	160	164	~~166~~	4	201	207	—	1st place, gold medalist(s)	371	1st place, gold medalist(s)
