= David Samayoa =

Canadian weightlifter

David Vincent Samayoa
Personal information
- Born: 9 July 1992 (age 34)
- Weight: 92.23 kg (203.3 lb)

Sport
- Country: Canada
- Sport: Weightlifting
- Team: National team
- Updated on 1 September 2016

David Vincent Samayoa (born 9 July 1992) is a Canadian male weightlifter, competing in the 94 kg category and representing Canada at international competitions. He has competed at world championships, including at the 2015 World Weightlifting Championships.

In 2012 he would win gold in the Canadian Junior Weightlifting Championships, at the age of 19, and following this intended to compete at the 2012 Junior World Weightlifting Championships. However and injury forced him to drop out of the competition.

== Major results ==
Year	Venue	Weight	Snatch (kg)				Clean & Jerk (kg)				Total	Rank
Year	Venue	Weight	1	2	3	Rank	1	2	3	Rank	Total	Rank
World Championships
2015	Houston, United States	94 kg	145	148	~~150~~	29	175	180	~~182~~	31	328	27
