= 2019 World Weightlifting Championships =

International weightlifting competition

2019 World Championships
- Host city: Pattaya, Thailand
- Dates: 18–27 September
- Main venue: Eastern National Sports Training Center

The 2019 World Weightlifting Championships was held in Pattaya, Thailand from 18 to 27 September 2019.

On September 12, Egypt was banned from competing at these Championships due to multiple doping offenses. The host nation, Thailand, was also banned from the Championships for the same reason.

== Medal summary ==
=== Men ===
Event	Gold		Silver		Bronze	
55 kg
Snatch	Om Yun-chol; North Korea	128 kg	Nguyễn Trần Anh Tuấn; Vietnam	120 kg	Igor Son; Kazakhstan	120 kg
Clean & Jerk	Om Yun-chol; North Korea	166 kg WR	Hafez Ghashghaei; Iran	149 kg	Mansour Al-Saleem; Saudi Arabia	147 kg
Total	Om Yun-chol; North Korea	294 kg WR	Igor Son; Kazakhstan	266 kg	Mansour Al-Saleem; Saudi Arabia	265 kg
61 kg
Snatch	Li Fabin; China	145 kg WR	Eko Yuli Irawan; Indonesia	140 kg	Yoichi Itokazu; Japan	135 kg
Clean & Jerk	Li Fabin; China	173 kg	Francisco Mosquera; Colombia	172 kg	Qin Fulin; China	171 kg
Total	Li Fabin; China	318 kg WR	Eko Yuli Irawan; Indonesia	306 kg	Francisco Mosquera; Colombia	302 kg
67 kg
Snatch	Feng Lüdong; China	153 kg	Daniyar İsmayilov; Turkey	150 kg	Chen Lijun; China	150 kg
Clean & Jerk	Pak Jong-ju; North Korea	188 kg WR	Chen Lijun; China	187 kg	Adkhamjon Ergashev; Uzbekistan	182 kg
Total	Chen Lijun; China	337 kg	Feng Lüdong; China	333 kg	Pak Jong-ju; North Korea	330 kg
73 kg
Snatch	Shi Zhiyong; China	166 kg	Bozhidar Andreev; Bulgaria	157 kg	Briken Calja; Albania	156 kg
Clean & Jerk	Shi Zhiyong; China	197 kg WR	O Kang-chol; North Korea	193 kg	Bozhidar Andreev; Bulgaria	189 kg
Total	Shi Zhiyong; China	363 kg WR	O Kang-chol; North Korea	347 kg	Bozhidar Andreev; Bulgaria	346 kg
81 kg
Snatch	Lü Xiaojun; China	171 kg	Li Dayin; China	171 kg	Andranik Karapetyan; Armenia	168 kg
Clean & Jerk	Lü Xiaojun; China	207 kg WR	Li Dayin; China	206 kg	Yunder Beytula; Bulgaria	201 kg
Total	Lü Xiaojun; China	378 kg WR	Li Dayin; China	377 kg	Brayan Rodallegas; Colombia	363 kg
89 kg
Snatch	Revaz Davitadze; Georgia	172 kg	Aliaksandr Bersanau; Belarus	169 kg	Keydomar Vallenilla; Venezuela	169 kg
Clean & Jerk	Toshiki Yamamoto; Japan	208 kg	Hakob Mkrtchyan; Armenia	208 kg	Ali Miri; Iran	207 kg
Total	Hakob Mkrtchyan; Armenia	375 kg	Ali Miri; Iran	374 kg	Revaz Davitadze; Georgia	371 kg
96 kg
Snatch	Anton Pliesnoi; Georgia	181 kg	Tian Tao; China	180 kg	Jhonatan Rivas; Colombia	179 kg
Clean & Jerk	Tian Tao; China	230 kg	Fares El-Bakh; Qatar	224 kg	Ayoub Mousavi; Iran	214 kg
Total	Tian Tao; China	410 kg	Fares El-Bakh; Qatar	402 kg	Anton Pliesnoi; Georgia	394 kg
102 kg
Snatch	Jin Yun-seong; South Korea	181 kg	Yauheni Tsikhantsou; Belarus	180 kg	Samvel Gasparyan; Armenia	178 kg
Clean & Jerk	Reza Dehdar; Iran	219 kg	Yauheni Tsikhantsou; Belarus	218 kg	Dmytro Chumak; Ukraine	217 kg
Total	Yauheni Tsikhantsou; Belarus	398 kg	Jin Yun-seong; South Korea	397 kg	Reza Dehdar; Iran	394 kg
109 kg
Snatch	Simon Martirosyan; Armenia	199 kg WR	Andrei Aramnau; Belarus	198 kg	Yang Zhe; China	197 kg
Clean & Jerk	Simon Martirosyan; Armenia	230 kg	Akbar Djuraev; Uzbekistan	229 kg	Andrei Aramnau; Belarus	228 kg
Total	Simon Martirosyan; Armenia	429 kg	Andrei Aramnau; Belarus	426 kg	Yang Zhe; China	420 kg
+109 kg
Snatch	Lasha Talakhadze; Georgia	220 kg WR	Gor Minasyan; Armenia	212 kg	Walid Bidani; Algeria	200 kg
Clean & Jerk	Lasha Talakhadze; Georgia	264 kg WR	Gor Minasyan; Armenia	248 kg	Ruben Aleksanyan; Armenia	245 kg
Total	Lasha Talakhadze; Georgia	484 kg WR	Gor Minasyan; Armenia	460 kg	Ruben Aleksanyan; Armenia	437 kg

=== Women ===
Event	Gold		Silver		Bronze	
45 kg
Snatch	Şaziye Erdoğan; Turkey	77 kg	Ludia Montero; Cuba	76 kg	Khổng Mỹ Phượng; Vietnam	74 kg
Clean & Jerk	Lisa Setiawati; Indonesia	95 kg	Şaziye Erdoğan; Turkey	92 kg	Vương Thị Huyền; Vietnam	91 kg
Total	Şaziye Erdoğan; Turkey	169 kg	Ludia Montero; Cuba	167 kg	Lisa Setiawati; Indonesia	165 kg
49 kg
Snatch	Hou Zhihui; China	94 kg	Jiang Huihua; China	94 kg	Ri Song-gum; North Korea	89 kg
Clean & Jerk	Jiang Huihua; China	118 kg WR	Hou Zhihui; China	117 kg	Ri Song-gum; North Korea	115 kg
Total	Jiang Huihua; China	212 kg WR	Hou Zhihui; China	211 kg	Ri Song-gum; North Korea	204 kg
55 kg
Snatch	Zhang Wanqiong; China	99 kg	Liao Qiuyun; China	98 kg	Muattar Nabieva; Uzbekistan	96 kg
Clean & Jerk	Liao Qiuyun; China	129 kg WR	Zhang Wanqiong; China	123 kg	Hidilyn Diaz; Philippines	121 kg
Total	Liao Qiuyun; China	227 kg WR	Zhang Wanqiong; China	222 kg	Hidilyn Diaz; Philippines	214 kg
59 kg
Snatch	Choe Hyo-sim; North Korea	107 kg WR	Kuo Hsing-chun; Chinese Taipei	106 kg	Chen Guiming; China	101 kg
Clean & Jerk	Kuo Hsing-chun; Chinese Taipei	140 kg WR	Choe Hyo-sim; North Korea	138 kg	Chen Guiming; China	132 kg
Total	Kuo Hsing-chun; Chinese Taipei	246 kg WR	Choe Hyo-sim; North Korea	245 kg	Chen Guiming; China	233 kg
64 kg
Snatch	Deng Wei; China	116 kg WR	Rim Un-sim; North Korea	114 kg	Loredana Toma; Romania	112 kg
Clean & Jerk	Deng Wei; China	145 kg WR	Rim Un-sim; North Korea	137 kg	Mercedes Pérez; Colombia	132 kg
Total	Deng Wei; China	261 kg WR	Rim Un-sim; North Korea	251 kg	Loredana Toma; Romania	240 kg
71 kg
Snatch	Katherine Nye; United States	112 kg	Kim Hyo-sim; North Korea	110 kg	Mattie Rogers; United States	106 kg
Clean & Jerk	Katherine Nye; United States	136 kg	Mattie Rogers; United States	134 kg	Emily Muskett; Great Britain	126 kg
Total	Katherine Nye; United States	248 kg	Mattie Rogers; United States	240 kg	Kim Hyo-sim; North Korea	230 kg
76 kg
Snatch	Rim Jong-sim; North Korea	124 kg WR	Zhang Wangli; China	118 kg	Neisi Dájomes; Ecuador	110 kg
Clean & Jerk	Zhang Wangli; China	153 kg	Rim Jong-sim; North Korea	152 kg	Aremi Fuentes; Mexico	138 kg
Total	Rim Jong-sim; North Korea	276 kg	Zhang Wangli; China	271 kg	Neisi Dájomes; Ecuador	245 kg
81 kg
Snatch	Lee Ji-eun; South Korea	111 kg	Kim Su-hyeon; South Korea	111 kg	Mönkhjantsangiin Ankhtsetseg; Mongolia	110 kg
Clean & Jerk	Leydi Solís; Colombia	142 kg	Jenny Arthur; United States	139 kg	Lydia Valentín; Spain	138 kg
Total	Leydi Solís; Colombia	247 kg	Lydia Valentín; Spain	246 kg	Jenny Arthur; United States	245 kg
87 kg
Snatch	Wang Zhouyu; China	120 kg	Kim Un-ju; North Korea	115 kg	Naryury Pérez; Venezuela	110 kg
Clean & Jerk	Wang Zhouyu; China	158 kg	Kim Un-ju; North Korea	154 kg	Tamara Salazar; Ecuador	144 kg
Total	Wang Zhouyu; China	278 kg	Kim Un-ju; North Korea	269 kg	Tamara Salazar; Ecuador	252 kg
+87 kg
Snatch	Li Wenwen; China	146 kg	Tatiana Kashirina; Russia	140 kg	Meng Suping; China	137 kg
Clean & Jerk	Li Wenwen; China	186 kg WR	Tatiana Kashirina; Russia	178 kg	Meng Suping; China	174 kg
Total	Li Wenwen; China	332 kg WR	Tatiana Kashirina; Russia	318 kg	Meng Suping; China	311 kg

== Medal table ==
Ranking by Big (Total result) medals

Rank	Nation	Gold	Silver	Bronze	Total
1	China	10	5	3	18
2	North Korea	2	4	3	9
3	Armenia	2	1	1	4
4	United States	1	1	1	3
5	Belarus	1	1	0	2
6	Colombia	1	0	2	3
6	Georgia	1	0	2	3
8	Chinese Taipei	1	0	0	1
8	Turkey	1	0	0	1
10	Indonesia	0	1	1	2
10	Iran	0	1	1	2
12	Cuba	0	1	0	1
12	Kazakhstan	0	1	0	1
12	Qatar	0	1	0	1
12	Russia	0	1	0	1
12	South Korea	0	1	0	1
12	Spain	0	1	0	1
18	Ecuador	0	0	2	2
19	Bulgaria	0	0	1	1
19	Philippines	0	0	1	1
19	Romania	0	0	1	1
19	Saudi Arabia	0	0	1	1
Totals (22 entries)		20	20	20	60

Ranking by all medals: Big (Total result) and Small (Snatch and Clean & Jerk)

Rank	Nation	Gold	Silver	Bronze	Total
1	China	29	14	10	53
2	North Korea	7	12	5	24
3	Georgia	5	0	2	7
4	Armenia	4	4	4	12
5	United States	3	3	2	8
6	South Korea	2	2	0	4
6	Turkey	2	2	0	4
8	Colombia	2	1	4	7
9	Chinese Taipei	2	1	0	3
10	Belarus	1	5	1	7
11	Iran	1	2	3	6
12	Indonesia	1	2	1	4
13	Japan	1	0	1	2
14	Russia	0	3	0	3
15	Cuba	0	2	0	2
15	Qatar	0	2	0	2
17	Bulgaria	0	1	3	4
18	Uzbekistan	0	1	2	3
18	Vietnam	0	1	2	3
20	Kazakhstan	0	1	1	2
20	Spain	0	1	1	2
22	Ecuador	0	0	4	4
23	Philippines	0	0	2	2
23	Romania	0	0	2	2
23	Saudi Arabia	0	0	2	2
23	Venezuela	0	0	2	2
27	Albania	0	0	1	1
27	Algeria	0	0	1	1
27	Great Britain	0	0	1	1
27	Mexico	0	0	1	1
27	Mongolia	0	0	1	1
27	Ukraine	0	0	1	1
Totals (32 entries)		60	60	60	180

== Team ranking ==
=== Men ===
Rank	Team	Points
1	China	700
2	South Korea	494
3	Iran	487
4	Georgia	471
5	Belarus	464
6	Armenia	427

=== Women ===
Rank	Team	Points
1	China	786
2	North Korea	511
3	United States	482
4	Colombia	451
5	Russia	382
6	Canada	359

== Participating nations ==
A total of 588 competitors from 97 nations participated.

- Albania (4)
- Algeria (2)
- Armenia (9)
- Australia (5)
- Austria (2)
- Azerbaijan (3)
- Bangladesh (2)
- Belarus (13)
- Belgium (2)
- Botswana (2)
- Brazil (8)
- Bulgaria (6)
- Cameroon (1)
- Canada (18)
- Chile (5)
- China (20)
- Chinese Taipei (14)
- Colombia (16)
- Croatia (6)
- Cuba (4)
- Czech Republic (8)
- Denmark (10)
- Dominican Republic (5)
- Ecuador (10)
- Estonia (2)
- Finland (5)
- France (8)
- Georgia (10)
- Germany (7)
- Ghana (1)
- Great Britain (14)
- Guam (2)
- Guatemala (2)
- Hungary (3)
- Iceland (2)
- India (7)
- Indonesia (8)
- Iran (14)
- Iraq (4)
- Ireland (4)
- Israel (5)
- Italy (9)
- Japan (20)
- Kazakhstan (9)
- Kiribati (2)
- Kyrgyzstan (2)
- Latvia (4)
- Lebanon (1)
- Libya (2)
- Lithuania (4)
- Madagascar (4)
- Malaysia (6)
- Malta (1)
- Marshall Islands (1)
- Mauritius (1)
- Mexico (11)
- Moldova (5)
- Mongolia (5)
- Nauru (3)
- Netherlands (1)
- New Zealand (3)
- Nicaragua (1)
- North Korea (12)
- Norway (6)
- Papua New Guinea (3)
- Peru (5)
- Philippines (9)
- Poland (6)
- Puerto Rico (6)
- Qatar (1)
- Romania (4)
- Russia (16)
- Saint Vincent and the Grenadines (1)
- Samoa (4)
- Saudi Arabia (4)
- Singapore (1)
- Slovakia (4)
- Solomon Islands (2)
- South Africa (4)
- South Korea (19)
- Spain (7)
- Sri Lanka (8)
- Sweden (2)
- Switzerland (2)
- Syria (1)
- Tonga (2)
- Tunisia (2)
- Turkey (12)
- Turkmenistan (14)
- Tuvalu (1)
- Ukraine (10)
- United Arab Emirates (1)
- United States (20)
- Uruguay (2)
- Uzbekistan (10)
- Venezuela (12)
- Vietnam (7)
