= Gabriel Sîncrăian =

Romanian weightlifter (born 1988)

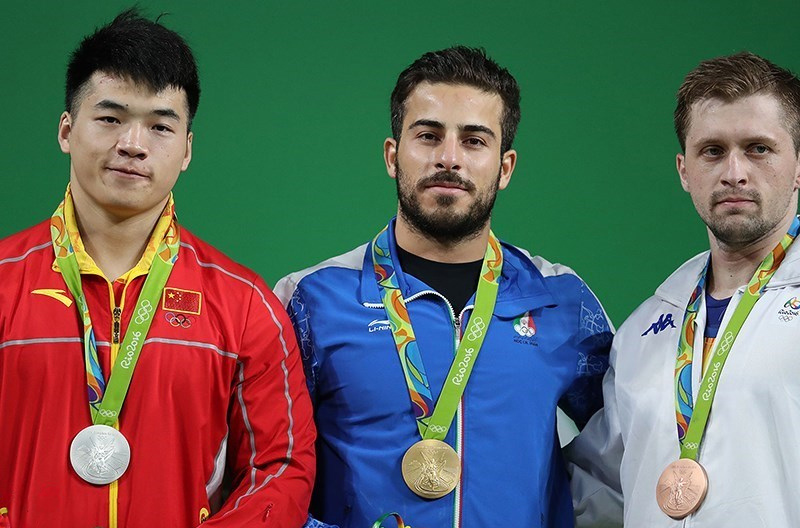
- Sîncrăian (right) at the 2016 Olympics

Personal information
- Born: 21 December 1988 (age 37) Cluj-Napoca, Romania
- Height: 174 cm (5 ft 9 in)
- Weight: 84.3 kg (186 lb) (2016)
- Website: www.gabrielsincraian.com

Sport
- Sport: Weightlifting
- Club: SCM Bistrita
Medal record
Representing Romania
Olympic Games
Disqualified	2016 Rio de Janeiro	85 kg
European Weightlifting Championships
Gold medal – first place	2012 Antalya	–85 kg
Disqualified	2016 Førde	–85 kg

Gabriel Sîncrăian (born 21 December 1988) is a Romanian weightlifter who competes in the 85 kg weight division.

== Career ==
He took part in the 2012 and 2016 Olympics and won a bronze medal in the same 85-kg event in 2016. Sîncrăian won two more medals at the European championships in 2012 and 2016.

On 13 October 2016, the IWF reported that Sincraian had tested positive for excess testosterone in a test connected to the Rio Olympics, and he was stripped of the medal.

In November 2020, the reanalysed doping tests from the 2012 Summer Olympics turned out positive for metenolone and stanozolol as well.

In 2022 the International Weightlifting Federation annulled his results between 3 August 2012 and 17 January 2022.
