= 2015 World Weightlifting Championships – Men's 77 kg =

Mens weightlifting competition

The men's 77 kilograms event at the 2015 World Weightlifting Championships was held on 23 and 24 November 2015 in Houston, United States.

== Schedule ==
Date	Time	Event
23 November 2015	08:30	Group D
23 November 2015	19:25	Group C
23 November 2015	21:30	Group B
24 November 2015	17:25	Group A

== Medalists ==
Event	Gold		Silver		Bronze	
Snatch	Lü Xiaojun (CHN)	175 kg	Andranik Karapetyan (ARM)	167 kg	Nijat Rahimov (KAZ)	165 kg
Clean & Jerk	Nijat Rahimov (KAZ)	207 kg	Mohamed Ehab (EGY)	201 kg	Andranik Karapetyan (ARM)	196 kg
Total	Nijat Rahimov (KAZ)	372 kg	Mohamed Ehab (EGY)	363 kg	Andranik Karapetyan (ARM)	363 kg

== Records ==
Prior to this competition, the existing world records were as follows.

World record	Snatch	Lü Xiaojun (CHN)	176 kg	Wrocław, Poland	24 October 2013
World record	Clean & Jerk	Oleg Perepetchenov (RUS)	210 kg	Trenčín, Slovakia	27 April 2001
World record	Total	Lü Xiaojun (CHN)	380 kg	Wrocław, Poland	24 October 2013

== Results ==
Rank	Athlete	Group	Body weight	Snatch (kg)				Clean & Jerk (kg)				Total
Rank	Athlete	Group	Body weight	1	2	3	Rank	1	2	3	Rank	Total
1st place, gold medalist(s)	Nijat Rahimov (KAZ)	A	75.88	155	160	165	3rd place, bronze medalist(s)	195	207	~~211~~	1st place, gold medalist(s)	372
2nd place, silver medalist(s)	Mohamed Ehab (EGY)	A	76.37	157	162	~~166~~	6	193	197	201	2nd place, silver medalist(s)	363
3rd place, bronze medalist(s)	Andranik Karapetyan (ARM)	A	76.94	164	~~167~~	167	2nd place, silver medalist(s)	~~191~~	191	196	3rd place, bronze medalist(s)	363
4	Viktor Getts (RUS)	A	76.77	155	160	163	5	190	195	~~202~~	4	358
5	Su Ying (CHN)	A	76.56	160	~~163~~	165	4	~~190~~	~~190~~	190	6	355
6	Pornchai Lobsi (THA)	B	76.58	150	155	158	7	~~185~~	185	190	7	348
7	Aidar Kazov (KAZ)	B	76.58	147	~~152~~	152	16	190	194	~~197~~	5	346
8	Chatuphum Chinnawong (THA)	A	76.85	~~155~~	155	~~160~~	12	190	~~195~~	~~195~~	8	345
9	Alexandru Șpac (MDA)	B	76.81	150	155	~~158~~	11	184	189	~~193~~	10	344
10	Erkand Qerimaj (ALB)	B	76.47	151	154	~~156~~	13	186	188	~~193~~	12	342
11	Max Lang (GER)	B	76.77	147	~~150~~	150	20	180	186	189	9	339
12	Junior Sánchez (VEN)	B	75.42	151	~~155~~	~~155~~	18	178	183	186	13	337
13	Krzysztof Szramiak (POL)	A	76.36	153	~~156~~	~~157~~	14	~~184~~	184	~~188~~	17	337
14	Dumitru Captari (ROU)	B	76.94	~~148~~	148	~~153~~	25	184	~~189~~	189	11	337
15	Kim Woo-jae (KOR)	C	76.52	147	151	155	10	181	~~186~~	~~187~~	24	336
16	Ivan Klim (BLR)	A	76.69	153	~~158~~	~~158~~	15	183	~~187~~	~~187~~	19	336
17	Yony Andica (COL)	C	76.08	142	146	150	19	180	185	~~188~~	14	335
18	Alexandru Roșu (ROU)	B	76.89	145	149	~~151~~	23	184	~~188~~	~~188~~	18	333
19	Nico Müller (GER)	C	76.80	142	146	149	22	178	183	~~187~~	21	332
20	Addriel La O (CUB)	C	74.85	146	151	~~155~~	17	180	~~185~~	~~185~~	25	331
21	Giorgi Lomtadze (GEO)	C	76.97	144	147	149	24	173	178	182	23	331
22	Andrés Mata (ESP)	C	76.56	140	145	~~150~~	29	185	~~190~~	~~190~~	15	330
23	Travis Cooper (USA)	C	76.70	143	~~146~~	146	28	178	183	~~187~~	20	329
24	Rami Bahloul (TUN)	C	76.85	146	150	~~153~~	21	178	~~182~~	~~182~~	27	328
25	Leo Hernández (USA)	C	77.00	142	147	~~150~~	26	175	180	~~183~~	26	327
26	Afgan Bayramov (AZE)	C	76.09	~~137~~	137	140	32	~~180~~	180	184	16	324
27	Andrés Caicedo (COL)	C	76.16	142	~~147~~	~~147~~	30	178	182	~~186~~	22	324
28	Triyatno (INA)	D	72.72	136	142	146	27	175	~~180~~	~~180~~	29	321
29	Jack Oliver (GBR)	D	76.64	136	~~140~~	140	33	170	~~176~~	176	28	316
30	Nguyễn Hồng Ngọc (VIE)	D	76.32	130	135	138	35	165	172	~~177~~	31	310
31	Bastián López (CHI)	D	76.64	132	~~135~~	135	39	170	173	175	30	310
32	Alejandro González (ESP)	D	76.13	135	~~140~~	~~140~~	38	~~165~~	165	171	32	306
33	Guwanç Atabaýew (TKM)	D	74.79	131	~~136~~	136	36	160	167	~~171~~	33	303
34	Kojum Taba (IND)	D	76.02	130	135	~~139~~	37	160	166	~~171~~	34	301
35	Tim Kring (DEN)	D	74.52	129	~~133~~	~~133~~	41	155	159	163	35	292
36	Chinthana Vidanage (SRI)	D	73.18	125	130	~~133~~	40	160	~~164~~	~~164~~	36	290
37	Ochirkhuyagiin Chuluuntsetseg (MGL)	D	75.85	115	~~120~~	120	42	147	153	~~155~~	37	273
38	Mönkhdelgeriin Gantulga (MGL)	D	77.00	115	~~120~~	~~120~~	43	~~147~~	147	~~151~~	39	262
—	Lü Xiaojun (CHN)	A	76.66	170	175	~~177~~	1st place, gold medalist(s)	~~201~~	~~201~~	~~201~~	—	—
—	Choe Jon-wi (PRK)	B	76.64	153	158	~~161~~	8	~~185~~	~~185~~	~~185~~	—	—
—	Rasoul Taghian (IRI)	A	76.76	153	158	~~162~~	9	~~193~~	~~193~~	~~194~~	—	—
—	Sathish Sivalingam (IND)	C	76.93	142	—	—	31	—	—	—	—	—
—	Semih Yağcı (TUR)	D	76.96	140	~~144~~	~~144~~	34	~~175~~	~~175~~	~~176~~	—	—
—	Cathal Byrd (IRL)	D	76.70	~~116~~	~~116~~	~~116~~	—	146	148	150	38	—
—	Tigran Martirosyan (ARM)	A	76.70	~~163~~	~~163~~	~~163~~	—	—	—	—	—	—
—	Rejepbaý Rejepow (TKM)	A	76.90	~~154~~	~~154~~	~~155~~	—	—	—	—	—	—
—	Ramzi Bahloul (TUN)	B	76.68	~~148~~	~~148~~	~~148~~	—	—	—	—	—	—
—	Bozhidar Andreev (BUL)	D	76.60	—	—	—	—	—	—	—	—	—
DQ	Kim Kwang-song (PRK)	A	76.76	162	166	171	—	193	~~201~~	201	—	372
DQ	Elkhan Aligulizada (AZE)	B	76.51	~~150~~	150	154	—	190	197	203	—	357
DQ	Artiom Pipa (MDA)	B	75.80	150	155	~~158~~	—	~~185~~	185	~~189~~	—	340
