= 2017 World Weightlifting Championships – Men's 77 kg =

The Men's 77 kg competition at the 2017 World Weightlifting Championships was held on 2 December 2017.

== Schedule ==
Date	Time	Event
1 December 2017	13:55	Group B
2 December 2017	11:55	Group A

== Medalists ==
Event	Gold		Silver		Bronze	
Snatch	Mohamed Ehab (EGY)	165 kg	Rejepbaý Rejepow (TKM)	158 kg	Erkand Qerimaj (ALB)	155 kg
Clean & Jerk	Mohamed Ehab (EGY)	196 kg	Rejepbaý Rejepow (TKM)	194 kg	Harrison Maurus (USA)	193 kg
Total	Mohamed Ehab (EGY)	361 kg	Rejepbaý Rejepow (TKM)	352 kg	Harrison Maurus (USA)	348 kg

== Records ==
Prior to this competition, the existing world records were as follows.

World record	Snatch	Lü Xiaojun (CHN)	177 kg	Rio de Janeiro, Brazil	10 August 2016
World record	Clean & jerk	~~Nijat Rahimov (KAZ)~~; Oleg Perepetchenov (RUS)	~~214 kg~~ 210 kg	~~Rio de Janeiro, Brazil~~; Trenčín, Slovakia	~~10 August 2016~~; 27 April 2001
World record	Total	Lü Xiaojun (CHN)	380 kg	Wrocław, Poland	24 October 2013

- Nijat Rahimov's world record was rescinded in 2022.

== Results ==
Rank	Athlete	Group	Snatch (kg)				Clean & Jerk (kg)				Total
Rank	Athlete	Group	1	2	3	Rank	1	2	3	Rank	Total
1st place, gold medalist(s)	Mohamed Ehab (EGY)	A	160	165	~~168~~	1st place, gold medalist(s)	~~191~~	191	196	1st place, gold medalist(s)	361
2nd place, silver medalist(s)	Rejepbaý Rejepow (TKM)	A	~~158~~	158	~~161~~	2nd place, silver medalist(s)	188	190	194	2nd place, silver medalist(s)	352
3rd place, bronze medalist(s)	Harrison Maurus (USA)	A	150	155	~~159~~	4	187	193	—	3rd place, bronze medalist(s)	348
4	Kim Woo-jae (KOR)	A	~~154~~	154	~~158~~	5	185	192	~~195~~	6	346
5	Andrés Mata (ESP)	A	150	~~154~~	154	6	186	190	~~193~~	7	344
6	Erkand Qerimaj (ALB)	A	155	~~157~~	~~157~~	3rd place, bronze medalist(s)	187	~~191~~	~~191~~	9	342
7	Kim Kwang-hoon (KOR)	A	145	~~150~~	150	11	185	192	~~195~~	5	342
8	Andrés Caicedo (COL)	A	~~148~~	148	~~154~~	14	192	~~195~~	~~195~~	4	340
9	Pornchai Lobsi (THA)	A	~~150~~	~~151~~	151	8	~~188~~	188	~~191~~	8	339
10	Brayan Rodallegas (COL)	A	150	~~155~~	~~156~~	9	182	187	~~193~~	10	337
11	Max Lang (GER)	A	145	149	~~151~~	12	178	183	185	11	334
12	Alejandro González (ESP)	B	145	150	153	7	~~180~~	180	~~191~~	15	333
13	Nico Müller (GER)	A	~~150~~	150	~~155~~	10	183	~~187~~	~~187~~	12	333
14	Sathish Sivalingam (IND)	B	143	148	~~151~~	13	~~175~~	175	180	16	328
15	Shakhzod Khudayberganov (UZB)	A	~~145~~	145	~~153~~	16	175	182	~~189~~	13	327
16	Angelo Bianco (USA)	B	141	146	~~150~~	15	180	~~190~~	~~190~~	14	326
17	Takehiro Kasai (JPN)	B	137	142	~~145~~	17	175	~~182~~	~~182~~	18	317
18	Tim Kring (DEN)	B	138	142	~~145~~	18	166	171	175	19	317
19	Chiang Tsung-han (TPE)	B	133	~~137~~	137	19	~~173~~	173	177	17	314
20	Nguyễn Hồng Ngọc (VIE)	B	~~133~~	133	~~136~~	21	171	~~176~~	—	20	304
21	Manop Chitrakan (THA)	B	130	135	~~138~~	20	165	~~170~~	~~170~~	21	300
DQ	Dumitru Captari (ROU)	B	147	153	156	—	~~185~~	~~186~~	~~190~~	—	—
