= Weightlifting at the 2018 Asian Games – Men's 77 kg =

Men's 77 kg at the 2018 Asian Games
- Venue: Jakarta International Expo
- Date: 23 August 2018
- Competitors: 21 from 15 nations

Medalists
gold medal	Choe Jon-wi	North Korea
silver medal	Kim Woo-jae	South Korea
bronze medal	Chatuphum Chinnawong	Thailand

The Men's 77-kilogram event at the 2018 Asian Games took place on 23 August 2018, at the Jakarta International Expo Hall A.

== Schedule ==
All times are Western Indonesia Time (UTC+07:00)

Date	Time	Event
Thursday, 23 August 2018	11:00	Group B
Thursday, 23 August 2018	14:00	Group A

== Records ==
Prior to this competition, the existing world, Asian and Games records were as follows.

World Record	Snatch	Lü Xiaojun (CHN)	177 kg	Rio de Janeiro, Brazil	10 August 2016
World Record	Clean & Jerk	~~Nijat Rahimov (KAZ)~~; Oleg Perepetchenov (RUS)	~~214 kg~~ 210 kg	~~Rio de Janeiro, Brazil~~; Trenčín, Slovakia	~~10 August 2016~~; 27 April 2001
World Record	Total	Lü Xiaojun (CHN)	380 kg	Wrocław, Poland	24 October 2013
Asian Record	Snatch	Lü Xiaojun (CHN)	177 kg	Rio de Janeiro, Brazil	10 August 2016
Asian Record	Clean & Jerk	~~Nijat Rahimov (KAZ)~~; Mohammad Ali Falahatinejad (IRI)	~~214 kg~~ 208 kg	~~Rio de Janeiro, Brazil~~; Qinhuangdao, China	~~10 August 2016~~; 12 September 2003
Asian Record	Total	Lü Xiaojun (CHN)	380 kg	Wrocław, Poland	24 October 2013
Games Record	Snatch	Lü Xiaojun (CHN)	175 kg	Incheon, South Korea	23 September 2014
Games Record	Clean & Jerk	Mohammad Hossein Barkhah (IRI)	202 kg	Busan, South Korea	4 October 2002
Games Record	Total	Sergey Filimonov (KAZ)	375 kg	Busan, South Korea	4 October 2002

- Nijat Rahimov's world and Asian records were rescinded in 2022.

== Results ==
Legend

- NM — No mark

Rank	Athlete	Group	Snatch (kg)				Clean & Jerk (kg)				Total
Rank	Athlete	Group	1	2	3	Result	1	2	3	Result	Total
1st place, gold medalist(s)	Choe Jon-wi (PRK)	A	155	~~160~~	~~160~~	155	~~185~~	185	193	193	348
2nd place, silver medalist(s)	Kim Woo-jae (KOR)	A	155	160	~~162~~	160	~~187~~	~~187~~	187	187	347
3rd place, bronze medalist(s)	Chatuphum Chinnawong (THA)	A	150	154	~~157~~	154	183	187	~~195~~	187	341
4	You Jae-sik (KOR)	A	145	~~150~~	150	150	~~180~~	~~180~~	180	180	330
5	Ajay Singh (IND)	A	140	145	~~148~~	145	170	177	182	182	327
6	Takehiro Kasai (JPN)	A	~~139~~	139	144	144	177	182	~~187~~	182	326
7	Pornchai Lobsi (THA)	A	143	146	~~149~~	146	171	~~181~~	~~182~~	171	317
8	Chiang Tsung-han (TPE)	A	~~140~~	~~140~~	140	140	171	176	~~182~~	176	316
9	Masakazu Ioroi (JPN)	A	140	~~145~~	~~145~~	140	169	~~175~~	175	175	315
10	Sathish Sivalingam (IND)	A	140	~~144~~	144	144	170	~~175~~	~~178~~	170	314
11	Rahmat Erwin Abdullah (INA)	B	135	140	142	142	165	170	172	172	314
12	Chuang Sheng-min (TPE)	B	140	~~145~~	~~145~~	140	170	~~175~~	~~175~~	170	310
13	Haider Ali (PAK)	B	130	135	~~137~~	135	160	168	~~171~~	168	303
14	Hani Al-Qassass (PLE)	B	110	115	~~120~~	115	137	141	~~150~~	141	256
15	Bikash Thapa (NEP)	B	113	~~118~~	~~118~~	113	~~135~~	135	~~137~~	135	248
16	Ilkhomjon Shukurov (TJK)	B	~~108~~	~~108~~	108	108	135	~~140~~	140	140	248
17	Zubair Nazari (AFG)	B	~~95~~	~~100~~	100	100	115	120	~~125~~	120	220
18	José Garcia Valente (TLS)	B	75	77	82	82	85	90	~~100~~	90	172
—	Shakhzod Khudayberganov (UZB)	A	~~148~~	149	153	153	~~182~~	~~182~~	~~185~~	—	NM
—	Ahmed Farooq (IRQ)	A	~~142~~	142	146	146	~~180~~	~~180~~	~~189~~	—	NM
—	I Ketut Ariana (INA)	B	—	—	—	—	—	—	—	—	NM
