= Weightlifting at the 2017 Summer Universiade – Men's 77 kg =

Men's 77 kg at the XXIX Summer Universiade
- Venues: Tamkang University Shao-Mo Memorial Gymnasium 7F
- Dates: 22 August 2017
- Competitors: 14 from 13 nations

Medalists
1st place, gold medalist(s)		Aidar Kazov	Kazakhstan
2nd place, silver medalist(s)		Viacheslav Iarkin	Russia
3rd place, bronze medalist(s)		Alex Bellemarre	Canada

The men's 77 kg event at the 2017 Summer Universiade was held on 22 August at the Tamkang University Shao-Mo Memorial Gymnasium 7F.

== Records ==
Prior to this competition, the existing world and Universiade records were as follows.

- Initial records

Category		Nation	Athlete	Record	Place	Date	Meet
World record	Snatch	China	Lü Xiaojun	177 kg	Rio de Janeiro, Brazil	10 August 2016	2016 Summer Olympics
World record	Clean & Jerk	Kazakhstan	Nijat Rahimov	214 kg	Rio de Janeiro, Brazil	10 August 2016	2016 Summer Olympics
World record	Total	China	Lü Xiaojun	380 kg	Wrocław, Poland	24 October 2013	2013 World Championships
Universiade records	Snatch	Russia (RUS)	Dmitriy Khomyakov	163 kg	Kazan, Russia	10 July 2013	2013 Summer Universiade
Universiade records	Clean & Jerk	Iran (IRI)	Rasoul Taghian	198 kg	Kazan, Russia	10 July 2013	2013 Summer Universiade
Universiade records	Total	Iran (IRI)	Rasoul Taghian	355 kg	Kazan, Russia	10 July 2013	2013 Summer Universiade

== Results ==
Rank	Athlete	Group	Body weight	Snatch (kg)				Clean & Jerk (kg)				Total
Rank	Athlete	Group	Body weight	1	2	3	Result	1	2	3	Result	Total
1st place, gold medalist(s)	Aidar Kazov (KAZ)	A	76.91	140	~~145~~	145	145	175	186	–	186	331
2nd place, silver medalist(s)	Viacheslav Iarkin (RUS)	A	75.79	145	150	~~153~~	150	171	176	180	180	330
3rd place, bronze medalist(s)	Alex Bellemarre (CAN)	A	76.51	142	~~147~~	147	147	164	169	~~172~~	169	316
4	Jaber Behrouzi (IRI)	A	74.04	140	~~144~~	~~144~~	140	171	~~177~~	~~177~~	171	311
5	Christian Angel Rodriguez (USA)	A	76.56	130	137	~~142~~	137	170	~~175~~	~~176~~	170	307
6	Chiang Tsung-han (TPE)	A	76.95	135	~~140~~	~~140~~	135	~~165~~	166	~~182~~	166	301
7	Luo Cheng (CHN)	B	71.86	133	~~138~~	~~138~~	133	155	~~159~~	~~159~~	155	288
8	Simranjeet S. Benipal (IND)	B	76.79	~~126~~	126	~~132~~	126	150	~~158~~	~~158~~	150	276
9	Terry Han (NZL)	B	76.69	118	123	~~127~~	123	148	~~155~~	~~155~~	148	271
10	Zohaib Niaz (PAK)	B	75.65	110	116	~~122~~	116	130	140	~~143~~	140	256
11	August Victor Ahlm (SWE)	B	73.99	106	111	~~115~~	111	136	~~146~~	~~146~~	136	247
12	Teng Chee Sing Jeremy (SGP)	B	73.89	87	92	~~97~~	92	113	118	121	121	213
	Jerome Boisclair (CAN)	B	76.10	~~130~~	~~130~~	~~130~~	–					–
	Gheorghe Cernei (ROU)	A	76.92	~~140~~	~~140~~	~~140~~	–					–
