= 2022 World Weightlifting Championships – Men's 81 kg =

{{

The men's 81 kilograms competition at the 2022 World Weightlifting Championships was held on 10 and 11 December 2022.

== Schedule ==
Date	Time	Event
10 December 2022	14:30	Group C
11 December 2022	11:30	Group B
11 December 2022	16:30	Group A

== Medalists ==
Event	Gold		Silver		Bronze	
Snatch	Li Dayin (CHN)	171 kg	Rejepbaý Rejepow (TKM)	164 kg	Kim Woo-jae (KOR)	162 kg
Clean & Jerk	Rejepbaý Rejepow (TKM)	202 kg	Li Dayin (CHN)	201 kg	Andrés Caicedo (COL)	197 kg
Total	Li Dayin (CHN)	372 kg	Rejepbaý Rejepow (TKM)	366 kg	Kim Woo-jae (KOR)	357 kg

== Records ==
Prior to this competition, the existing world records were as follows.

World Record	Snatch	Li Dayin (CHN)	175 kg	Tashkent, Uzbekistan	21 April 2021
World Record	Clean & Jerk	Karlos Nasar (BUL)	208 kg	Tashkent, Uzbekistan	12 December 2021
World Record	Total	Lü Xiaojun (CHN)	378 kg	Pattaya, Thailand	22 September 2019

== Results ==
Rank	Athlete	Group	Snatch (kg)				Clean & Jerk (kg)				Total
Rank	Athlete	Group	1	2	3	Rank	1	2	3	Rank	Total
1st place, gold medalist(s)	Li Dayin (CHN)	A	167	171	~~174~~	1st place, gold medalist(s)	196	~~201~~	201	2nd place, silver medalist(s)	372
2nd place, silver medalist(s)	Rejepbaý Rejepow (TKM)	A	164	~~168~~	~~169~~	2nd place, silver medalist(s)	195	202	~~209~~	1st place, gold medalist(s)	366
3rd place, bronze medalist(s)	Kim Woo-jae (KOR)	A	155	~~160~~	162	3rd place, bronze medalist(s)	190	~~194~~	195	5	357
4	Marin Robu (MDA)	A	161	~~165~~	~~165~~	4	190	~~197~~	~~197~~	7	351
5	Oscar Reyes (ITA)	A	155	~~160~~	~~160~~	7	187	~~192~~	196	4	351
6	Andrés Caicedo (COL)	A	148	~~153~~	~~155~~	10	188	193	197	3rd place, bronze medalist(s)	345
7	Mukhammadkodir Toshtemirov (UZB)	A	156	~~160~~	~~163~~	5	~~186~~	~~186~~	187	9	343
8	Yelaman Seitkazy (KAZ)	A	151	156	~~160~~	6	~~186~~	186	~~191~~	10	342
9	Gustavo Maldonado (COL)	A	~~148~~	148	~~152~~	11	~~185~~	188	191	6	339
10	Iván Escudero (ECU)	B	145	150	153	9	183	~~190~~	~~191~~	11	336
11	Ogabek Tukhtaev (UZB)	B	139	144	146	12	180	~~186~~	~~191~~	13	326
12	Darvin Castro (VEN)	B	140	~~145~~	145	14	180	~~186~~	~~186~~	12	325
13	Travis Cooper (USA)	B	140	144	~~146~~	15	175	180	~~185~~	14	324
14	Chris Murray (GBR)	B	~~140~~	140	145	13	175	~~179~~	~~180~~	17	320
15	Irmantas Kačinskas (LTU)	B	138	~~142~~	143	16	165	169	~~172~~	20	312
16	Javier González (ESP)	B	138	~~143~~	~~145~~	17	166	171	174	18	312
17	Samuel Guertin (CAN)	B	135	~~140~~	~~140~~	18	168	172	176	16	311
18	Dante Pizzuti (ARG)	B	130	~~135~~	135	19	168	~~171~~	~~171~~	21	303
19	Josué Aguilar (MEX)	C	127	~~131~~	~~131~~	22	166	171	~~175~~	19	298
20	Matthew McCullough (USA)	C	~~130~~	~~130~~	130	21	156	160	~~165~~	22	290
21	Žilvinas Žilinskas (LTU)	C	125	130	133	20	155	~~159~~	~~160~~	23	288
22	Goran Ćetković (CRO)	C	120	~~126~~	~~126~~	24	150	~~155~~	155	24	275
23	Omarie Mears (JAM)	C	120	124	~~127~~	23	145	~~150~~	150	25	274
24	Shammah Noel (GUY)	C	85	~~90~~	90	25	105	112	~~118~~	26	202
—	Andrés Mata (ESP)	A	~~153~~	~~153~~	~~153~~	—	185	190	~~195~~	8	—
—	Nicolas Vachon (CAN)	B	~~138~~	~~138~~	~~138~~	—	171	179	~~185~~	15	—
—	Mirmostafa Javadi (IRI)	A	155	~~161~~	~~162~~	8	~~196~~	~~197~~	~~198~~	—	—
—	Shi Zhiyong (CHN)	A	Did not start								—
—	Chuang Sheng-min (TPE)	B	Did not start								—
