= Mukhammadkodir Toshtemirov =

Uzbekistani weightlifter (born 2001)

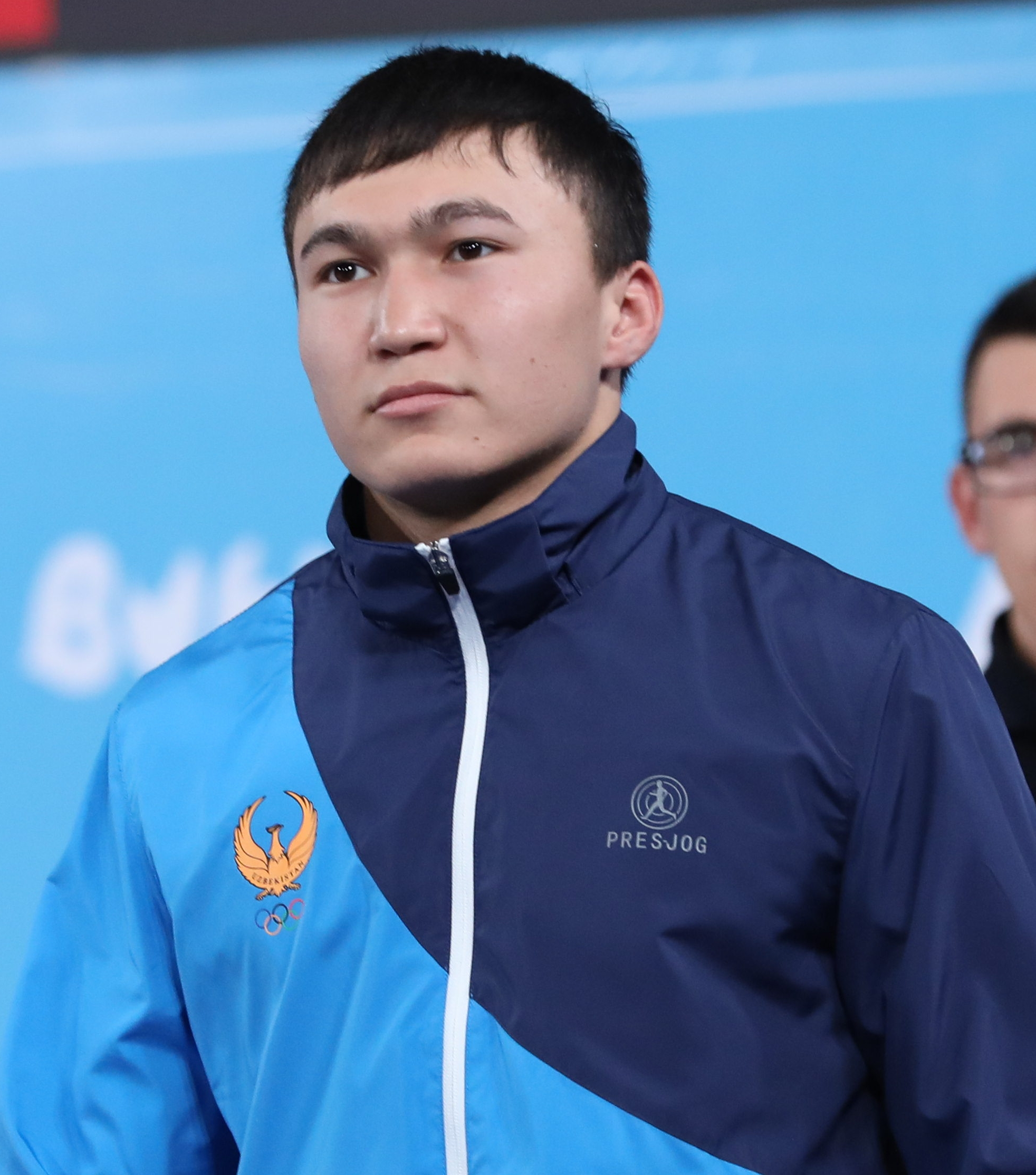
- Mukhammadkodir Toshtemirov at 2018 Summer Youth Olympics

Personal information
- Born: 17 September 2001 (age 25)

Sport
- Country: Uzbekistan
- Sport: Weightlifting
- Weight class: 81 kg
Medal record
Men's weightlifting
Representing Uzbekistan
World Championships
| Bronze medal – third place | 2023 Riyadh | 81 kg |
| Bronze medal – third place | 2024 Manama | 81 kg |
Asian Games
| Silver medal – second place | 2022 Hangzhou | 81 kg |
Islamic Solidarity Games
| Bronze medal – third place | 2021 Konya | 81 kg |
Asian Championships
| Silver medal – second place | 2020 Tashkent | 81 kg |
| Silver medal – second place | 2026 Gandhinagar | 94 kg |
| Bronze medal – third place | 2022 Manama | 81 kg |
Junior World Championships
| Gold medal – first place | 2021 Tashkent | 81 kg |
Summer Youth Olympics
| Silver medal – second place | 2018 Buenos Aires | 77 kg |

Mukhammadkodir Toshtemirov (born 17 September 2001) is an Uzbekistani weightlifter. He won the bronze medal in the men's 81 kg event at the 2023 World Weightlifting Championships held in Riyadh, Saudi Arabia. He also won bronze at the 2024 World Weightlifting Championships held in Bahrain.

Toshtemirov won the silver medal in the men's 81 kg event at the 2020 Asian Weightlifting Championships held in Tashkent, Uzbekistan. He also won the gold medal in his event at the 2021 Junior World Weightlifting Championships, also held in Tashkent, Uzbekistan.

== Career ==
In 2018, Toshtemirov won the silver medal in the 77 kg event at the Summer Youth Olympics held in Buenos Aires, Argentina. That year, he also competed in the men's 73 kg event at the 2018 World Weightlifting Championships held in Ashgabat, Turkmenistan. He also competed in men's 81 kg event at the 2019 World Weightlifting Championships held in Pattaya, Thailand.

Toshtemirov could have received the continental slot for Asia in the men's 81 kg event to represent Uzbekistan at the 2020 Summer Olympics in Tokyo, Japan but he was not selected as Uzbekistan was restricted to two competitors per gender due to past doping violations.

Toshtemirov won the gold medal in the men's 81 kg Snatch event at the 2021 Islamic Solidarity Games held in Konya, Turkey. He won the bronze medal in the men's 81 kg event with a total lift of 354 kg.

Toshtemirov won the bronze medal in the men's 81 kg event at the 2022 Asian Weightlifting Championships held in Manama, Bahrain. He competed in the men's 81 kg event at the 2022 World Weightlifting Championships in Bogotá, Colombia.

In September 2023, he won the bronze medal in the men's 81 kg event at the World Weightlifting Championships held in Riyadh, Saudi Arabia. A few weeks later, he won the silver medal in the men's 81 kg event at the 2022 Asian Games held in Hangzhou, China.
