= 2023 World Weightlifting Championships – Men's 81 kg =

The men's 81 kilograms competition at the 2023 World Weightlifting Championships was held on 10 and 11 September 2023.

== Schedule ==
Date	Time	Event
10 September 2023	14:00	Group C
11 September 2023	11:30	Group B
11 September 2023	16:30	Group A

== Medalists ==
Event	Gold		Silver		Bronze	
Snatch	Mukhammadkodir Toshtemirov (UZB)	164 kg	Oscar Reyes (ITA)	163 kg	Rafik Harutyunyan (ARM)	162 kg
Clean & Jerk	Rahmat Erwin Abdullah (INA)	209 kg	Bozhidar Andreev (BUL)	195 kg	Gaýgysyz Töräýew (TKM)	193 kg
Total	Oscar Reyes (ITA)	356 kg	Rahmat Erwin Abdullah (INA)	354 kg	Mukhammadkodir Toshtemirov (UZB)	352 kg

== Records ==
Prior to this competition, the existing world records were as follows.

World Record	Snatch	Li Dayin (CHN)	175 kg	Tashkent, Uzbekistan	21 April 2021
World Record	Clean & Jerk	Karlos Nasar (BUL)	208 kg	Tashkent, Uzbekistan	12 December 2021
World Record	Total	Lü Xiaojun (CHN)	378 kg	Pattaya, Thailand	22 September 2019

== Results ==
Rank	Athlete	Group	Snatch (kg)				Clean & Jerk (kg)				Total
Rank	Athlete	Group	1	2	3	Rank	1	2	3	Rank	Total
1st place, gold medalist(s)	Oscar Reyes (ITA)	A	156	161	163	2nd place, silver medalist(s)	~~192~~	~~193~~	193	4	356
2nd place, silver medalist(s)	Rahmat Erwin Abdullah (INA)	B	145	—	—	14	190	200	209 CWR	1st place, gold medalist(s)	354
3rd place, bronze medalist(s)	Mukhammadkodir Toshtemirov (UZB)	A	157	161	164	1st place, gold medalist(s)	188	~~191~~	~~191~~	6	352
4	Bozhidar Andreev (BUL)	A	154	~~158~~	~~159~~	6	190	~~195~~	195	2nd place, silver medalist(s)	349
5	Yelaman Seitkazy (KAZ)	A	150	~~154~~	154	7	182	187	191	5	345
6	Gaýgysyz Töräýew (TKM)	A	145	148	150	11	183	188	193	3rd place, bronze medalist(s)	343
7	Erkand Qerimaj (ALB)	A	153	~~156~~	156	5	~~182~~	~~182~~	182	8	338
8	Briken Calja (ALB)	B	~~150~~	150	~~154~~	10	182	187	~~191~~	7	337
9	Petr Mareček (CZE)	B	143	146	151	9	173	~~177~~	179	9	330
10	Alberto Fernández (ESP)	B	148	~~155~~	~~155~~	12	170	~~175~~	175	15	323
11	Sebastián Cabala (SVK)	B	143	~~146~~	146	13	172	~~175~~	175	16	321
12	Javier González (ESP)	B	140	~~145~~	145	15	165	170	175	14	320
13	Mahmoud Al-Humayd (KSA)	B	~~140~~	140	144	16	165	174	~~177~~	17	318
14	Chris Murray (GBR)	B	138	142	~~145~~	18	171	177	~~182~~	12	319
15	Maksat Meredow (TKM)	B	135	141	~~145~~	19	171	178	~~181~~	10	319
16	Samuel Guertin (CAN)	C	~~140~~	140	~~145~~	20	170	~~177~~	177	11	317
17	Darvin Castro (VEN)	B	142	~~146~~	~~146~~	17	175	~~178~~	~~179~~	13	317
18	Ruben Katoatau (KIR)	C	128	132	136	22	166	172	~~177~~	18	308
19	Žilvinas Žilinskas (LTU)	C	133	137	140	21	160	166	~~171~~	19	306
20	Jeremie Ngouanom Nzali (CMR)	C	128	132	135	23	~~162~~	162	166	20	301
21	Bikash Bhatt (NEP)	C	115	124	~~128~~	24	141	148	—	21	272
22	Omarie Mears (JAM)	C	117	121	~~123~~	25	142	146	~~150~~	24	267
23	Anthony Libasia Masinde (KEN)	C	111	116	~~122~~	26	141	~~146~~	147	22	263
24	Md Shohag Mia (BAN)	C	~~105~~	105	111	28	140	146	~~150~~	23	257
25	Sood Al-Mutairi (KUW)	C	100	110	115	27	120	—	—	25	235
—	Andrés Caicedo (COL)	A	150	155	158	4	~~192~~	~~193~~	~~194~~	—	—
—	Rafik Harutyunyan (ARM)	A	155	160	162	3rd place, bronze medalist(s)	~~190~~	~~190~~	~~193~~	—	—
—	Hossein Soltani (IRI)	A	~~152~~	153	~~159~~	8	~~186~~	~~187~~	~~188~~	—	—
—	Shi Zhiyong (CHN)	C	—	—	—	—	—	—	—	—	—
—	Denis Ulanov (KAZ)	B	Did not start								
—	Kalilu Bangura (SLE)	C	Did not start								
—	Adriel La O (WRT)	C	Did not start								
