= 2024 World Weightlifting Championships – Men's 81 kg =

Men's 81 kg at the 2024 World Weightlifting Championships
- Venue: Weightlifting Marquee Venue
- Location: Manama, Bahrain
- Dates: 9 December (Group C); 10 December (Group A and B)
- Competitors: 31 from 27 nations
- Winning total: 371 kg

Medalists
gold medal	Ri Chong-song	North Korea
silver medal	Alexey Churkin	Kazakhstan
bronze medal	Mukhammadkodir Toshtemirov	Uzbekistan

The men's 81 kilograms competition at the 2024 World Weightlifting Championships was held on 9 and 10 December 2024.

== Schedule ==
Date	Time	Event
9 December 2024	10:00	Group C
10 December 2024	12:30	Group B
10 December 2024	17:30	Group A

== Records ==
Prior to this competition, the existing world records were as follows.

World record	Snatch	Li Dayin (CHN)	175 kg	Tashkent, Uzbekistan	21 April 2021
World record	Clean & Jerk	Rahmat Erwin Abdullah (INA)	209 kg	Riyadh, Saudi Arabia	11 September 2023
World record	Total	Lü Xiaojun (CHN)	378 kg	Pattaya, Thailand	22 September 2019

== Results ==
Rank	Athlete	Group	Snatch (kg)				Clean & Jerk (kg)				Total
Rank	Athlete	Group	1	2	3	Rank	1	2	3	Rank	Total
1st place, gold medalist(s)	Ri Chong-song (PRK)	A	~~161~~	161	166	1st place, gold medalist(s)	~~201~~	201	205	1st place, gold medalist(s)	371
2nd place, silver medalist(s)	Alexey Churkin (KAZ)	A	155	160	164	3rd place, bronze medalist(s)	195	200	204	2nd place, silver medalist(s)	368
3rd place, bronze medalist(s)	Mukhammadkodir Toshtemirov (UZB)	A	~~161~~	161	165	2nd place, silver medalist(s)	~~190~~	190	~~195~~	9	355
4	Son Hyeon-ho (KOR)	A	151	155	~~158~~	7	195	197	~~202~~	3rd place, bronze medalist(s)	352
5	Alexandr Uvarov (KAZ)	A	155	160	~~163~~	4	191	~~196~~	~~196~~	7	351
6	Kwon Dae-hee (KOR)	A	150	~~155~~	155	8	~~195~~	~~196~~	196	5	351
7	Rahmat Erwin Abdullah (INA)	B	147	154	—	9	193	~~200~~	~~202~~	6	347
8	Gaýgysyz Töräýew (TKM)	A	~~148~~	148	~~152~~	15	190	196	~~198~~	4	344
9	Liu Xu (CHN)	A	~~158~~	~~158~~	158	5	185	~~190~~	~~190~~	12	343
10	Rakuei Azuma (JPN)	B	141	146	150	12	184	190	~~194~~	8	340
11	Vadzim Likharad (AIN)	B	150	~~155~~	155	6	181	~~185~~	~~185~~	16	336
12	Gustavo Maldonado (COL)	B	150	~~154~~	~~155~~	10	180	185	~~190~~	11	335
13	Edward Ginnan (USA)	B	142	146	150	13	~~182~~	~~183~~	184	14	334
14	Reza Baghi Shamasbi (IRI)	B	~~142~~	144	149	14	175	184	~~190~~	13	333
15	Archil Malakmadze (GEO)	B	146	150	~~154~~	11	~~174~~	175	181	19	331
16	Kristi Ramadani (ALB)	B	146	150	151	18	181	—	—	17	327
17	Andrei Fralou (AIN)	B	146	~~151~~	~~151~~	17	175	181	~~186~~	18	327
18	Dmytro Kondratiuk (UKR)	C	140	~~145~~	~~145~~	22	180	186	~~191~~	10	326
19	Sebastián Cabala (SVK)	B	~~145~~	145	~~150~~	21	180	~~183~~	~~184~~	20	325
20	Samuel Guertin (CAN)	C	~~140~~	140	145	20	~~172~~	172	178	21	323
21	Huang Pin-hsun (TPE)	C	~~140~~	140	~~145~~	24	175	183	~~190~~	15	323
22	Mahmoud Al-Humayd (KSA)	C	140	145	~~148~~	19	170	177	~~180~~	22	322
23	Hmayak Misakyan (AUT)	B	~~147~~	147	~~151~~	16	171	~~176~~	~~176~~	24	318
24	Jon-antohein Phillips (RSA)	C	118	123	~~128~~	26	158	163	168	25	291
25	Adriel La O (WRT)	C	125	130	~~134~~	25	160	~~165~~	~~165~~	26	290
26	Rylee Borg (MLT)	C	114	118	121	28	145	150	153	27	274
27	Nikola Todorović (CRO)	C	115	119	122	27	146	151	~~154~~	28	273
—	Preston Powell (USA)	C	140	~~145~~	~~145~~	23	~~175~~	~~175~~	~~175~~	—	—
—	Javier González (ESP)	C	~~137~~	~~137~~	~~138~~	—	170	175	~~180~~	23	—
—	Erkand Qerimaj (ALB)	B	~~155~~	~~155~~	~~156~~	—	—	—	—	—	—
—	Oscar Reyes (ITA)	A	—	—	—	—	—	—	—	—	—
—	Eslam Abouelwafa (EGY)	A	Did not start								
