= 2024 World Weightlifting Championships – Women's 59 kg =

Women's 59 kg at the 2024 World Weightlifting Championships
- Venue: Weightlifting Marquee Venue
- Location: Manama, Bahrain
- Dates: 9 December
- Competitors: 21 from 19 nations
- Winning total: 249 kg

Medalists
| gold medal | Kim Il-gyong | North Korea |
| silver medal | Pei Xinyi | China |
| bronze medal | Yenny Álvarez | Colombia |

The women's 59 kilograms competition at the 2024 World Weightlifting Championships was held on 9 December 2024.

== Schedule ==
| Date | Time | Event |
|---|---|---|
| 9 December 2024 | 14:30 | Group B |
| 9 December 2024 | 17:30 | Group A |

== Records ==
Prior to this competition, the existing world records were as follows.

| World Record | Snatch | Kim Il-gyong (PRK) | 111 kg | Hangzhou, China | 2 October 2023 |
| World Record | Clean & Jerk | Kuo Hsing-chun (TPE) | 140 kg | Pattaya, Thailand | 21 September 2019 |
| World Record | Total | Luo Shifang (CHN) | 248 kg | Phuket, Thailand | 3 April 2024 |

== Results ==
| Rank | Athlete | Group | Snatch (kg) | | | | Clean & Jerk (kg) | | | | Total |
| Rank | Athlete | Group | 1 | 2 | 3 | Rank | 1 | 2 | 3 | Rank | Total |
|---|---|---|---|---|---|---|---|---|---|---|---|
| 1st place, gold medalist(s) | Kim Il-gyong (PRK) | A | 103 | 106 | 108 | 1st place, gold medalist(s) | 130 | 134 | 141 CWR | 1st place, gold medalist(s) | 249 CWR |
| 2nd place, silver medalist(s) | Pei Xinyi (CHN) | A | 100 | 104 | 107 | 2nd place, silver medalist(s) | 130 | ~~133~~ | ~~133~~ | 2nd place, silver medalist(s) | 237 |
| 3rd place, bronze medalist(s) | Yenny Álvarez (COL) | A | 98 | ~~100~~ | ~~100~~ | 4 | 123 | 126 | — | 3rd place, bronze medalist(s) | 224 |
| 4 | Suratwadee Yodsarn (THA) | A | 94 | ~~96~~ | 97 | 5 | 120 | ~~125~~ | 125 | 4 | 222 |
| 5 | Quàng Thị Tâm (VIE) | A | ~~93~~ | 93 | 96 | 6 | 113 | 118 | 121 | 5 | 217 |
| 6 | Natasya Beteyob (INA) | A | ~~93~~ | ~~94~~ | 94 | 9 | ~~116~~ | 116 | 120 | 6 | 214 |
| 7 | Saara Retulainen (FIN) | A | 92 | ~~95~~ | ~~95~~ | 10 | 115 | 119 | ~~123~~ | 7 | 211 |
| 8 | Lucrezia Magistris (ITA) | A | 95 | ~~98~~ | 99 | 3rd place, bronze medalist(s) | 111 | ~~116~~ | ~~116~~ | 12 | 210 |
| 9 | Ann-Sophie Taschereau (CAN) | B | 90 | 94 | ~~96~~ | 7 | 110 | 113 | 115 | 8 | 209 |
| 10 | Alina Shchapanava (AIN) | A | 94 | ~~96~~ | ~~97~~ | 8 | 114 | ~~117~~ | ~~117~~ | 9 | 208 |
| 11 | Ine Andersson (NOR) | B | 86 | ~~88~~ | ~~89~~ | 13 | 111 | ~~114~~ | ~~115~~ | 10 | 197 |
| 12 | Irene Borrego (MEX) | B | 86 | 89 | ~~91~~ | 11 | 106 | ~~109~~ | ~~110~~ | 15 | 195 |
| 13 | Daphne Guillén (MEX) | B | ~~85~~ | 85 | ~~88~~ | 16 | 106 | 110 | ~~111~~ | 13 | 195 |
| 14 | Amalie Løvind (DEN) | B | 80 | 84 | ~~87~~ | 17 | 104 | 108 | 111 | 11 | 195 |
| 15 | Jessica Gordon Brown (GBR) | B | ~~85~~ | 85 | ~~88~~ | 15 | 105 | 108 | ~~111~~ | 14 | 193 |
| 16 | Maëlyn Michel (FRA) | B | 86 | ~~89~~ | 89 | 12 | 103 | ~~107~~ | ~~107~~ | 18 | 192 |
| 17 | Þuríður Erla Helgadóttir (ISL) | B | ~~78~~ | 80 | 82 | 18 | 100 | 103 | 105 | 16 | 187 |
| 18 | Scheila Meister (SUI) | B | 81 | 84 | 86 | 14 | ~~100~~ | 100 | ~~104~~ | 20 | 186 |
| 19 | Kayla Shepard (CAN) | B | ~~76~~ | 76 | 80 | 19 | 100 | ~~105~~ | ~~106~~ | 19 | 180 |
| 20 | Ýulduz Jumabaýewa (TKM) | B | 77 | ~~80~~ | ~~82~~ | 20 | 103 | ~~106~~ | ~~107~~ | 17 | 180 |
| 21 | Ivana Gorišek (CRO) | B | 70 | 73 | ~~76~~ | 21 | 82 | 85 | 87 | 21 | 160 |
| — | Zoe Smith (GBR) | B | Did not start | | | | | | | | |
