= Weightlifting at the 2014 Summer Youth Olympics – Boys' 69 kg =

Boys' 69 at the II Summer Youth Olympic Games
- Venue: Nanjing International Expo Center
- Dates: August 19, 2014
- Competitors: 12 from 12 nations
- Winning total weight: 300kg

Medalists
1st place, gold medalist(s)		Bozhidar Andreev	Bulgaria
2nd place, silver medalist(s)		Viacheslav Iarkin	Russia
3rd place, bronze medalist(s)		Andrés Caicedo	Colombia

The boys' 69 kg weightlifting event was the second men's event at the weightlifting competition at the 2014 Summer Youth Olympics, with competitors limited to a maximum of 69 kilograms of body mass.

Each lifter performed in both the snatch and clean and jerk lifts, with the final score being the sum of the lifter's best result in each. The athlete received three attempts in each of the two lifts; the score for the lift was the heaviest weight successfully lifted.

== Results ==
Rank	Name	Body Weight	Snatch (kg)				Clean & Jerk (kg)				Total (kg)
Rank	Name	Body Weight	1	2	3	Res	1	2	3	Res	Total (kg)
1st place, gold medalist(s)	Bozhidar Andreev (BUL)	68.65	125	130	133	133	157	162	167	167	300
2nd place, silver medalist(s)	Viacheslav Iarkin (RUS)	68.24	127	132	134	134	155	160	~~162~~	160	294
3rd place, bronze medalist(s)	Andrés Caicedo (COL)	68.38	125	130	132	132	~~150~~	153	158	158	290
4	Mikhail Makeyev (KAZ)	68.75	~~125~~	~~125~~	125	125	153	~~166~~	~~166~~	153	278
5	Wilson Magallanes (VEN)	68.62	115	~~120~~	~~120~~	115	140	145	153	153	268
6	Marius Petrache (ROU)	68.46	122	~~126~~	~~128~~	122	140	145	~~150~~	145	267
7	Óscar Terrones (PER)	67.67	105	109	112	112	137	143	148	148	260
8	Marcus Sadey (GER)	65.40	100	105	~~108~~	105	127	133	137	137	242
9	Luis Castillo Martinez (DOM)	68.08	~~108~~	108	110	110	127	132	~~135~~	132	242
10	Cameron McTaggart (NZL)	68.44	~~107~~	107	~~111~~	107	125	128	131	131	238
11	Aydan McMahon (AUS)	67.83	95	100	~~103~~	100	116	121	~~125~~	121	221
12	Evans Sikoto (KEN)	67.70	78	83	~~90~~	83	102	106	~~110~~	106	189
