= Hossein Soltani =

Iranian weightlifter (born 1999)

Personal information
- Full name: Hossein Soltani
- Nationality: Iranian
- Born: 2 December 1999 (age 26)
- Weight: 81 kg (179 lb)

Sport
- Country: Iran
- Sport: Weightlifting
- Event: 81 kg

Achievements and titles
- Personal bests: Snatch: 156 kg (2021); Clean and jerk: 191 kg (2023); Total: 345 kg (2023)
Medal record
Representing Iran
Men's weightlifting
Asian Championships
Gold medal – first place	2023 Jinju	81 kg
Islamic Solidarity Games
Bronze medal – third place	2021 Konya	81 kg S
Bronze medal – third place	2021 Konya	81 kg C&J

Hossein Soltani (Persian: حسین سلطانی; born 2 December 1999) is an Iranian weightlifter who won a gold medal at the 2023 Asian Championships.

== Major results ==
Year	Venue	Weight	Snatch (kg)				Clean & Jerk (kg)				Total	Rank
Year	Venue	Weight	1	2	3	Rank	1	2	3	Rank	Total	Rank
World Championships
2018	Ashgabat, Turkmenistan	73 kg	142	146	~~150~~	14	174	~~178~~	~~180~~	18	320	19
2023	Riyadh, Saudi Arabia	81 kg	~~152~~	153	~~159~~	8	~~186~~	~~187~~	~~188~~	--	--	--
Asian Games
2023	Hangzhou, China	81 kg	147	~~152~~	154	5	181	~~191~~	~~195~~	5	335	5
Asian Championships
2021	Tashkent, Uzbekistan	81 kg	156	~~161~~	~~161~~	5	--	--	--	--	--	--
2023	Jinju, South Korea	81 kg	149	154	~~157~~	2nd place, silver medalist(s)	184	~~195~~	~~196~~	1st place, gold medalist(s)	338	1st place, gold medalist(s)
World Juniors Championships
Asian Juniors Championships
World Youth Championships
Asian Youth Championships
2016	Tokyo, Japan	69 kg	124	~~128~~	~~129~~	4	149	~~161~~	~~161~~	3rd place, bronze medalist(s)	273	4
