= Andrés Caicedo (weightlifter) =

Colombian weightlifter (born 1997)

Personal information
- Full name: Andrés Mauricio Caicedo Piedrahita
- Born: 15 August 1997 (age 28)
- Weight: 76.16 kg (167.9 lb)

Sport
- Country: Colombia
- Sport: Weightlifting
- Weight class: 81 kg
Medal record
Representing Colombia
Men's weightlifting
Pan American Championships
Gold medal – first place	2016 Cartagena	77 kg
Bolivarian Games
Gold medal – first place	2017 Santa Marta	77 kg CJ
Gold medal – first place	2017 Santa Marta	77 kg
Silver medal – second place	2017 Santa Marta	77 kg S
Youth Olympic Games
Bronze medal – third place	2014 Nanjing	69 kg
- Updated on 9 December 2024

Andrés Mauricio Caicedo Piedrahita (Note: In this Spanish name, the first or paternal surname is Caicedo and the second or maternal family name is Piedrahita.) (born 15 August 1997) is a Colombian male weightlifter, competing in the 77 kg category and representing Colombia at international competitions. He participated at the 2016 Summer Olympics in the men's 77 kg event, finishing 6th. He competed at world championships, including at the 2015 World Weightlifting Championships.

Prior to the 2018 World Weightlifting Championships, Caicedo was provisionally suspended for testing positive for the anabolic steroid, Boldenone. Fellow Colombian and Junior World Champion at 77 kg, Yeison López, was also provisionally suspended for testing positive for the same substance. The International Weightlifting Federation later banned them both until 2022 for testing positive for Boldenone and its metabolites.

== Achievements ==
Year	Venue	Weight	Snatch (kg)				Clean & Jerk (kg)				Total	Rank
Year	Venue	Weight	1	2	3	Rank	1	2	3	Rank	Total	Rank
Representing Colombia
Olympic Games
2016	Rio de Janeiro, Brazil	77 kg	~~150~~	150	155	5	191	~~197~~	~~197~~	4	346	5
World Championships
2015	Houston, United States	77 kg	142	~~147~~	~~147~~	30	178	182	~~186~~	22	324	27
2017	Anaheim, United States	77 kg	~~148~~	148	~~154~~	14	192	~~195~~	~~195~~	4	340	8
2022	Bogotá, Colombia	81 kg	148	~~153~~	~~155~~	10	188	193	197	3rd place, bronze medalist(s)	345	6
2023	Riyadh, Saudi Arabia	81 kg	150	155	158	4	~~192~~	~~193~~	~~194~~	—N/a	—N/a	—N/a
Youth Olympic Games
2014	Nanjing, China	69 kg	125	130	132	3	~~150~~	153	158	3	290	3rd place, bronze medalist(s)
