= Andrés Serna =

Colombian weightlifter (born 1997)

Personal information
- Born: 15 November 1997 (age 28)

Sport
- Country: Colombia
- Sport: Weightlifting
Medal record
Men's weightlifting
Representing Colombia
Pan American Championships
| Gold medal – first place | 2022 Bogotá | 96 kg |
Bolivarian Games
| Gold medal – first place | 2017 Santa Marta | 94 kg S |
| Gold medal – first place | 2022 Valledupar | 109 kg S |
| Gold medal – first place | 2022 Valledupar | 109 kg CJ |
| Silver medal – second place | 2017 Santa Marta | 94 kg |
| Bronze medal – third place | 2017 Santa Marta | 94 kg CJ |

Andrés Felipe Serna Martínez (born 15 November 1997) is a Colombian weightlifter. He won the gold medal in the men's 96 kg event at the 2022 Pan American Weightlifting Championships held in Bogotá, Colombia. He is also a two-time gold medalist at the 2022 Bolivarian Games held in Valledupar, Colombia.

In 2017, Serna competed in the men's 94 kg event at the World Weightlifting Championships held in Anaheim, California, United States. He also competed in the men's 96 kg event at the 2021 World Weightlifting Championships held in Tashkent, Uzbekistan. Serna competed in the men's 109 kg event at the 2022 South American Games held in Asunción, Paraguay.

== Achievements ==
| Year | Venue | Weight | Snatch (kg) | | | | Clean & Jerk (kg) | | | | Total | Rank |
| Year | Venue | Weight | 1 | 2 | 3 | Rank | 1 | 2 | 3 | Rank | Total | Rank |
Representing Colombia
World Championships
| 2017 | Anaheim, United States | 94 kg | ~~155~~ | 155 | 160 | 11 | ~~192~~ | 192 | ~~202~~ | 12 | 352 | 10 |
| 2021 | Tashkent, Uzbekistan | 96 kg | 153 | 158 | 163 | 15 | 198 | 203 | 208 | 7 | 371 | 10 |
Pan American Championships
| 2021 | Guayaquil, Ecuador | 96 kg | ~~155~~ | ~~155~~ | ~~155~~ | — | 195 | ~~206~~ | ~~206~~ | 3rd place, bronze medalist(s) | — | — |
| 2022 | Bogotá, Colombia | 96 kg | ~~160~~ | 160 | 162 | 1st place, gold medalist(s) | 200 | ~~215~~ | ~~215~~ | 1st place, gold medalist(s) | 362 | 1st place, gold medalist(s) |
Bolivarian Games
| 2017 | Santa Marta, Colombia | 94 kg | 156 | ~~160~~ | 160 | 1st place, gold medalist(s) | 195 | ~~199~~ | ~~201~~ | 3rd place, bronze medalist(s) | 355 | 2nd place, silver medalist(s) |
| 2022 | Valledupar, Colombia | 109 kg | 160 | 165 | 167 | 1st place, gold medalist(s) | 195 | 200 | ~~210~~ | 1st place, gold medalist(s) | —N/a | —N/a |
