= Pei Xinyi =

Chinese weightlifter (born 2005)

Personal information
- Nationality: Chinese
- Born: 10 January 2005 (age 21)
- Height: 163 cm (5 ft 4 in)
- Weight: 58.9 kg (130 lb)

Sport
- Country: China
- Sport: Weightlifting
- Event: –59 kg
Medal record
Representing China
World Championships
Gold medal – first place	2022 Bogotá	–64 kg
Gold medal – first place	2026 Ningbo	–61 kg
Bronze medal – third place	2023 Riyadh	–59 kg
Silver medal – second place	2024 Manama	–59 kg
Asian Championships
Silver medal – second place	2023 Jinju	–59 kg

Pei Xinyi (Chinese: 裴鑫依; born 10 January 2005) is a Chinese weightlifter World Champion, competing in the 59 kg division.

At the 2022 World Championships in Bogotá she set 5 youth world records in the 64 kg category.

At the 2023 Asian Championships in Jinju she set 4 junior world records in the 59 kg category. She won the bronze medal in the women's 59 kg event at the 2023 World Weightlifting Championships held in Riyadh, Saudi Arabia.

== Achievements ==
Year	Venue	Weight	Snatch (kg)				Clean & Jerk (kg)				Total	Rank
Year	Venue	Weight	1	2	3	Rank	1	2	3	Rank	Total	Rank
World Championships
2022	Bogotá, Colombia	64 kg	100	103	105	1st place, gold medalist(s)	125	128	~~135~~	1st place, gold medalist(s)	233	1st place, gold medalist(s)
2023	Riyadh, Saudi Arabia	59 kg	98	~~102~~	102	3rd place, bronze medalist(s)	127	~~130~~	130	4	232	3rd place, bronze medalist(s)
2024	Manama, Bahrain	59 kg	100	104	107	2nd place, silver medalist(s)	130	~~133~~	~~133~~	2nd place, silver medalist(s)	237	2nd place, silver medalist(s)
Asian Championships
2023	Jinju, South Korea	59 kg	100	103	~~106~~	2nd place, silver medalist(s)	125	130	133	1st place, gold medalist(s)	236	2nd place, silver medalist(s)
IWF World Cup
2024	Phuket, Thailand	59 kg	103	~~107~~	~~107~~	4	130	~~134~~	~~134~~	3rd place, bronze medalist(s)	233	4
