= Aidar Kazov =

Kazakhstani weightlifter

Personal information
- Native name: Айдар Қазов
- Nationality: Kazakh
- Born: 21 February 1995 (age 31) Magzhan Zhumabayev District, North Kazakhstan Region, Kazakhstan
- Height: 162 cm (5 ft 4 in)
- Weight: 77 kg (170 lb)

Sport
- Country: Kazakhstan
- Sport: Olympic Weightlifting
- Event: 77 kg
- Coached by: Erik Alibayev

Achievements and titles
- Personal bests: Snatch: 156 kg (2015); Clean and jerk: 194 kg (2015); Total: 350 kg (2015)
Medal record
Representing Kazakhstan
Men's weightlifting
Asian Championships
Gold medal – first place	2015 Phuket	– 77 kg
Summer Universiade
Gold medal – first place	2017 Taipei	– 77 kg
- Updated on 22 August 2017

Aidar Kazov (Kazakh: Айдар Қазов; born 21 February 1995 in Magzhan Zhumabayev District, North Kazakhstan Region, Kazakhstan) is a Kazakh weightlifter who competes in the men's 77 kg weight category.

== Career ==
Kazov won the gold medal at the 2015 Asian Weightlifting Championships in the 77 kg category. He won gold – snatched 156 kg and clean and jerked an additional 194 kg for a total of 350 kg.

Aidar participated in the men's 69 kg class at 2015 World Weightlifting Championships in Houston, United States. Where he finished 7th – snatched 152 kg and clean and jerked an additional 194 kg for a total of 346 kg.

He has won gold of the Men's 77 kg weightlifting competition at the Summer Universiade in Taipei.

== Major results ==
Year	Venue	Weight	Snatch (kg)				Clean & Jerk (kg)				Total	Rank
Year	Venue	Weight	1	2	3	Rank	1	2	3	Rank	Total	Rank
World Championships
2015	Houston, United States	77 kg	147	~~152~~	152	16	190	194	~~197~~	5	346	7
Asian Championships
2015	Phuket, Thailand	77 kg	151	156	~~158~~	4	191	~~194~~	194	1st place, gold medalist(s)	350	1st place, gold medalist(s)
2017	Ashgabat, Turkmenistan	77 kg	140	145	148	4	175	183	186	2nd place, silver medalist(s)	334	4
Summer Universiade
2017	New Taipei, Taiwan	77 kg	140	~~145~~	145	3rd place, bronze medalist(s)	175	186	-	1st place, gold medalist(s)	331	1st place, gold medalist(s)
