= Kim Woo-jae =

South Korean weightlifter (born 1991)

Personal information
- Nationality: Korean
- Born: 26 September 1991 (age 34)
- Weight: 80.51 kg (177.5 lb)

Sport
- Country: South Korea
- Sport: Weightlifting
- Event: 81 kg

Achievements and titles
- Personal bests: Snatch: 160 kg (2018); Clean and jerk: 192 kg (2017); Total: 347 kg (2018)
Medal record
Representing South Korea
Men's weightlifting
World Championships
Bronze medal – third place	2022 Bogotá	81 kg
Asian Games
Silver medal – second place	2018 Jakarta	77kg

Kim Woo-jae (Korean: 김우재; born 26 September 1991) is a South Korean weightlifter competing in the 77 kg category until 2018 and 81 kg starting in 2018 after the International Weightlifting Federation reorganized the categories. He won the bronze medal in the men's 81 kg event at the 2022 World Weightlifting Championships held in Bogotá, Colombia.

== Career ==
He won the silver medal at the 2018 Asian Games in the 77 kg division.

== Major results ==
Year	Venue	Weight	Snatch (kg)				Clean & Jerk (kg)				Total	Rank
Year	Venue	Weight	1	2	3	Rank	1	2	3	Rank	Total	Rank
Representing South Korea
World Championships
2015	Houston, United States	77 kg	147	151	155	10	181	~~186~~	~~187~~	24	336	15
2017	Anaheim, United States	77 kg	~~154~~	154	~~158~~	6	185	192	~~195~~	6	346	4
2018	Ashgabat, Turkmenistan	81 kg	~~155~~	156	~~163~~	8	~~190~~	~~190~~	~~190~~	--	--	--
2022	Bogotá, Colombia	81 kg	155	~~160~~	162	3rd place, bronze medalist(s)	190	~~194~~	195	5	357	3rd place, bronze medalist(s)
Asian Games
2018	Jakarta, Indonesia	77 kg	155	160	~~162~~	1	~~187~~	~~187~~	187	2	347	2nd place, silver medalist(s)
