= Weightlifting at the 2022 Asian Games – Men's 81 kg =

Men's 81 kg at the 2022 Asian Games
- Venue: Xiaoshan Sports Center Gymnasium
- Date: 3–4 October 2023
- Competitors: 14 from 12 nations

Medalists
gold medal	Ri Chong-song	North Korea
silver medal	Mukhammadkodir Toshtemirov	Uzbekistan
bronze medal	Alexandr Uvarov	Kazakhstan

The men's 81 kilograms competition at the 2022 Asian Games took place on 3 and 4 October 2023 at Xiaoshan Sports Center Gymnasium.

== Schedule ==
All times are China Standard Time (UTC+08:00)

Date	Time	Event
Tuesday, 3 October 2023	15:00	Group B
Wednesday, 4 October 2023	19:00	Group A

== Records ==
Prior to this competition, the existing world, Asian and Games records were as follows.

World Record	Snatch	Li Dayin (CHN)	175 kg	Tashkent, Uzbekistan	21 April 2021
World Record	Clean & Jerk	Rahmat Erwin Abdullah (INA)	209 kg	Riyadh, Saudi Arabia	11 September 2023
World Record	Total	Lü Xiaojun (CHN)	378 kg	Pattaya, Thailand	22 September 2019
Asian Record	Snatch	Li Dayin (CHN)	175 kg	Tashkent, Uzbekistan	21 April 2021
Asian Record	Clean & Jerk	Rahmat Erwin Abdullah (INA)	209 kg	Riyadh, Saudi Arabia	11 September 2023
Asian Record	Total	Lü Xiaojun (CHN)	378 kg	Pattaya, Thailand	22 September 2019
Games Record	Snatch	Asian Games Standard	166 kg	—	1 November 2018
Games Record	Clean & Jerk	Asian Games Standard	199 kg	—	1 November 2018
Games Record	Total	Asian Games Standard	358 kg	—	1 November 2018

== Results ==
Legend

- NM — No mark

Rank	Athlete	Group	Snatch (kg)				Clean & Jerk (kg)				Total
Rank	Athlete	Group	1	2	3	Result	1	2	3	Result	Total
1st place, gold medalist(s)	Ri Chong-song (PRK)	A	160	165	169	169	195	~~210~~	~~210~~	195	364
2nd place, silver medalist(s)	Mukhammadkodir Toshtemirov (UZB)	A	155	159	~~163~~	159	185	189	192	192	351
3rd place, bronze medalist(s)	Alexandr Uvarov (KAZ)	A	149	154	~~158~~	154	185	~~191~~	194	194	348
4	Yelaman Seitkazy (KAZ)	A	149	154	~~157~~	154	184	189	~~195~~	189	343
5	Hossein Soltani (IRI)	A	147	~~152~~	154	154	181	~~191~~	~~195~~	181	335
6	Chuang Sheng-min (TPE)	A	~~150~~	~~150~~	150	150	172	~~186~~	~~190~~	172	322
7	Furqan Anwar (PAK)	B	130	~~133~~	133	133	157	163	166	166	299
8	Worrapot Nasuriwong (THA)	A	120	~~130~~	~~130~~	120	~~170~~	170	~~176~~	170	290
9	Bikash Bhatt (NEP)	B	~~120~~	120	~~125~~	120	~~145~~	145	~~150~~	145	265
10	Zubair Nazari (AFG)	B	103	107	~~110~~	107	128	135	~~140~~	135	242
11	Sanligrenchingiin Tsengüm (MGL)	B	97	104	~~110~~	104	~~123~~	123	~~130~~	123	227
—	Chatuphum Chinnawong (THA)	A	140	~~145~~	148	148	~~165~~	~~165~~	~~165~~	—	NM
—	José Garcia Valente (TLS)	B	~~95~~	~~95~~	~~95~~	—	—	—	—	—	NM
—	Amur Al-Khanjari (OMA)	A	~~145~~	~~147~~	~~147~~	—	—	—	—	—	NM

== New records ==
The following records were established during the competition.

Snatch	169	Ri Chong-song (PRK)	GR
Total	364	Ri Chong-song (PRK)	GR
