= Rattanawan Wamalun =

Thai weightlifter (born 1995)

Personal information
- Nationality: Thai
- Born: 15 July 1995 (age 30) Amnat Charoen, Thailand
- Height: 1.61 m (5 ft 3 in)
- Weight: 63.38 kg (140 lb)

Sport
- Country: Thailand
- Sport: Weightlifting
- Event: –64 kg
Medal record
World Championships
Silver medal – second place	2022 Bogotá	64 kg
Disqualified	2018 Ashgabat	64 kg

Rattanawan Wamalun (born 15 July 1995) is a Thai weightlifter. She won the silver medal in the women's 64 kg event at the 2022 World Weightlifting Championships held in Bogotá, Colombia.

She participated at the 2018 World Weightlifting Championships, winning a medal.

In February 2019 she was issued a two-year doping ban until February 2021 after testing positive for 5a-androstane-3a, 17 bdiol (5aAdiol) and 5b-androstane-3a, 17 b-diol (5bAdiol).
