= Ri Chong-song =

North Korean weightlifter (born 1997)

Personal information
- Born: May 31, 1997 (age 29) North Korea
- Height: 1.67 m (5 ft 6 in)
- Weight: 81 kg (179 lb)

Sport
- Country: North Korea
- Sport: Weightlifting

Achievements and titles
- Personal bests: Snatch: 169 kg (2024); Clean & Jerk: 209 kg (2023); Total: 374 kg (2023)
Medal record
Men's weightlifting
Representing North Korea
World Championships
Gold medal – first place	2024 Manama	81 kg
Silver medal – second place	2025 Førde	79 kg
Asian Games
Gold medal – first place	2022 Hangzhou	81 kg
Bronze medal – third place	2026 Aichi–Nagoya	75 kg
Asian Championships
Gold medal – first place	2024 Tashkent	81 kg
Silver medal – second place	2026 Gandhinagar	79 kg
IWF World Cup
Gold medal – first place	2024 Phuket	81 kg

Korean name
- Hangul: 리청성
- RR: Ri Cheongseong
- MR: Ri Ch'ŏngsŏng

Ri Chong-song (Korean: 리청성; born 31 May 1997) is a North Korean weightlifter competing in the men's 79 kg category.

== Career ==
Ri Chong-song won the gold medal in the men's 81 kg event at the 2024 World Weightlifting Championships held in Manama, Bahrain, and a gold medal in the men's 81 kg event at the 2024 Asian Weightlifting Championships held in Tashkent, Uzbekistan, and 2022 Asian Games held in Hangzhou, China.

== Achievements ==
Year	Venue	Weight	Snatch (kg)				Clean & Jerk (kg)				Total	Rank
Year	Venue	Weight	1	2	3	Rank	1	2	3	Rank	Total	Rank
World Championships
2018	Ashgabat, Turkmenistan	73 kg	150	~~154~~	155	4	182	187	~~190~~	3rd place, bronze medalist(s)	342	4
2024	Manama, Bahrain	81 kg	~~161~~	161	166	1st place, gold medalist(s)	~~201~~	201	205	1st place, gold medalist(s)	371	1st place, gold medalist(s)
2025	Førde, Norway	79 kg	160	163	~~166~~	1st place, gold medalist(s)	~~197~~	197	~~201~~	6	360	2nd place, silver medalist(s)
Asian Championships
2024	Tashkent, Uzbekistan	81 kg			169	1st place, gold medalist(s)			200	1st place, gold medalist(s)	369	1st place, gold medalist(s)
2026	Ghandinagar, India	79 kg	155	~~161~~	161	1st place, gold medalist(s)	197	~~206~~	~~206~~	2nd place, silver medalist(s)	358	2nd place, silver medalist(s)
Asian Games
2022	Hangzhou, China	81 kg	160	165	169	1st place, gold medalist(s)	195	~~210~~	~~210~~	1st place, gold medalist(s)	364	1st place, gold medalist(s)
