= Natalia Llamosa =

Colombian weightlifter (born 1997)

Personal information
- Full name: Nathalia Llamosa Mosquera
- Born: 14 June 1997 (age 29)

Sport
- Country: Colombia
- Sport: Weightlifting
- Weight class: 64 kg
Medal record
Representing Colombia
Women's weightlifting
World Championships
Gold medal – first place	2023 Riyadh	64 kg
Bronze medal – third place	2022 Bogotá	64 kg
Pan American Championships
Gold medal – first place	2018 Santo Domingo	63 kg
Gold medal – first place	2021 Guayaquil	64 kg
Gold medal – first place	2022 Bogotá	64 kg
Silver medal – second place	2019 Guatemala City	64 kg
Central American and Caribbean Games
Gold medal – first place	2018 Barranquilla	63 kg S
Gold medal – first place	2023 San Salvador	64 kg CJ
Silver medal – second place	2023 San Salvador	64 kg S
South American Games
Gold medal – first place	2022 Asunción	64 kg
Bronze medal – third place	2018 Cochabamba	63 kg
Bolivarian Games
Gold medal – first place	2022 Valledupar	64 kg S
Silver medal – second place	2022 Valledupar	64 kg CJ

Nathalia Llamosa Mosquera (born 14 June 1997) is a Colombian weightlifter. She won the gold medal in the women's 64 kg event at the 2023 World Weightlifting Championships held in Riyadh, Saudi Arabia. She is a four-time medalist, including three gold medals, at the Pan American Weightlifting Championships. She won two medals, including gold, at the 2022 Bolivarian Games held in Valledupar, Colombia.

Llamosa won the gold medal in the women's 63 kg Snatch event at the 2018 Central American and Caribbean Games held in Barranquilla, Colombia. She finished in 4th place in the Clean & Jerk.

Llamosa won the gold medal in the women's 64 kg event at the 2022 South American Games held in Asunción, Paraguay. She won the bronze medal in the women's 64 kg event at the 2022 World Weightlifting Championships held in Bogotá, Colombia.

== Achievements ==
Year	Venue	Weight	Snatch (kg)				Clean & Jerk (kg)				Total	Rank
Year	Venue	Weight	1	2	3	Rank	1	2	3	Rank	Total	Rank
Representing Colombia
World Championships
2019	Pattaya, Thailand	64 kg	98	102	~~104~~	7	120	~~125~~	~~125~~	15	222	7
2022	Bogotá, Colombia	64 kg	101	~~103~~	~~104~~	2nd place, silver medalist(s)	121	123	~~127~~	3rd place, bronze medalist(s)	224	3rd place, bronze medalist(s)
2023	Riyadh, Saudi Arabia	64 kg	99	101	~~103~~	1st place, gold medalist(s)	118	121	122	3rd place, bronze medalist(s)	223	1st place, gold medalist(s)
Pan American Championships
2018	Santo Domingo, Dominican Republic	63 kg	95	99	101	1st place, gold medalist(s)	118	122	124	3rd place, bronze medalist(s)	225	1st place, gold medalist(s)
2019	Guatemala City, Guatemala	64 kg	98	102	~~104~~	1st place, gold medalist(s)	122	125	~~127~~	4	227	2nd place, silver medalist(s)
2020	Santo Domingo, Dominican Republic	64 kg	~~101~~	101	~~105~~	4	120	123	~~126~~	5	224	4
2021	Guayaquil, Ecuador	64 kg	99	102	104	1st place, gold medalist(s)	120	124	~~127~~	1st place, gold medalist(s)	228	1st place, gold medalist(s)
2022	Bogotá, Colombia	64 kg	100	103	106	1st place, gold medalist(s)	123	126	129	1st place, gold medalist(s)	235	1st place, gold medalist(s)
Central American and Caribbean Games
2018	Barranquilla, Colombia	63 kg	96	99	102	1st place, gold medalist(s)	119	~~123~~	~~124~~	4	—N/a	—N/a
2023	San Salvador, El Salvador	64 kg	97	100	102	2nd place, silver medalist(s)	120	125	~~127~~	1st place, gold medalist(s)	—N/a	—N/a
South American Games
2018	Cochabamba, Bolivia	63 kg	94	97	~~100~~	—N/a	118	122	~~124~~	—N/a	219	3rd place, bronze medalist(s)
2022	Asunción, Paraguay	64 kg	100	—	—	—N/a	120	—	—	—N/a	220	1st place, gold medalist(s)
Bolivarian Games
2022	Valledupar, Colombia	64 kg	100	103	105	1st place, gold medalist(s)	122	126	~~129~~	2nd place, silver medalist(s)	—N/a	—N/a
