= Weightlifting at the 2026 Asian Games – Women's 61 kg =

Women's 61 kg at the 2026 Asian Games
- Venue: Nagoya Trade & Industry Center
- Date: 25 September 2026
- Competitors: 12 from 12 nations

Medalists
gold medal	Yang Liuyue	China
silver medal	Pak Jin-hae	North Korea
bronze medal	Kuo Hsing-chun	Chinese Taipei

The women's 61 kilograms competition at the 2026 Asian Games was held on 25 September 2026 at the Nagoya Trade & Industry Center.

== Schedule ==
All times are Japan Standard Time (UTC+09:00)

Date	Time	Event
Friday, 25 September 2026	10:00	Group B
Friday, 25 September 2026	17:00	Group A

== Records ==
Prior to this competition, the existing world, Asian and Games records were as follows.

World Record	Snatch	World Standard	107 kg	—	1 August 2026
World Record	Clean & Jerk	World Standard	136 kg	—	1 August 2026
World Record	Total	World Standard	241 kg	—	1 August 2026
Asian Record	Snatch	Asian Standard	106 kg	—	1 August 2026
Asian Record	Clean & Jerk	Asian Standard	135 kg	—	1 August 2026
Asian Record	Total	Asian Standard	240 kg	—	1 August 2026
Games Record	Snatch	Asian Games Standard	106 kg	—	1 August 2026
Games Record	Clean & Jerk	Asian Games Standard	133 kg	—	1 August 2026
Games Record	Total	Asian Games Standard	237 kg	—	1 August 2026

== Results ==
Rank	Athlete	Group	Snatch (kg)				Clean & Jerk (kg)				Total
Rank	Athlete	Group	1	2	3	Result	1	2	3	Result	Total
1st place, gold medalist(s)	Yang Liuyue (CHN)	A	106	110	112	112	135	~~139~~	139	139	251
2nd place, silver medalist(s)	Pak Jin-hae (PRK)	A	105	~~109~~	109	109	~~135~~	135	139	139	248
3rd place, bronze medalist(s)	Kuo Hsing-chun (TPE)	A	102	104	107	107	130	~~138~~	~~138~~	130	237
4	Thanaporn Saetia (THA)	A	~~97~~	97	99	99	120	124	126	126	225
5	Elreen Ando (PHI)	A	98	101	~~103~~	101	~~123~~	123	~~126~~	123	224
6	Natasya Beteyob (INA)	A	94	98	~~100~~	98	118	122	~~124~~	122	220
7	Nirupama Devi Seram (IND)	A	90	93	~~95~~	93	120	124	~~127~~	124	217
8	An Si-sung (KOR)	A	93	~~96~~	96	96	118	~~124~~	~~124~~	118	214
9	Riri Endo (JPN)	A	~~90~~	90	93	93	110	113	115	115	208
10	Battsendiin Otgontuul (MGL)	B	~~75~~	75	~~80~~	75	95	~~99~~	99	99	174
11	Mai Al-Madani (UAE)	B	68	71	73	73	83	~~86~~	86	86	159
12	Cheng Ching To (HKG)	B	63	67	70	70	80	85	~~90~~	85	155

== New records ==
The following records were established during the competition.

Snatch	107	Kuo Hsing-chun (TPE)	AR
Snatch	109	Pak Jin-hae (PRK)	WR
Snatch	110	Yang Liuyue (CHN)	WR
Snatch	112	Yang Liuyue (CHN)	WR
Clean & Jerk	135	Yang Liuyue (CHN)	GR
Clean & Jerk	139	Pak Jin-hae (PRK)	WR
Total	247	Yang Liuyue (CHN)	WR
Total	248	Pak Jin-hae (PRK)	WR
Total	251	Yang Liuyue (CHN)	WR
