= Yang Liuyue =

Chinese weightlifter (born 2006)

Personal information
- Born: 10 December 2006 (age 19)

Sport
- Country: China
- Sport: Weightlifting
- Weight class: 61 kg
Medal record
Women's weightlifting
Representing China
World Championships
| Silver medal – second place | 2026 Ningbo | 61 kg |
Asian Games
| Gold medal – first place | 2026 Aichi–Nagoya | 61 kg |
Asian Championships
| Silver medal – second place | 2026 Gandhinagar | 63 kg |
World Junior Championships
| Gold medal – first place | 2025 Lima | 64 kg |

Yang Liuyue (Chinese: 杨柳月; born 10 December 2006) is a Chinese weightlifter and world record holder.

== Career ==
Yang competed at the 2025 World Junior Weightlifting Championships and won a gold medal in the 64 kg with a snatch of 106 kg, a clean and jerk of 130 kg, and a total of 236 kg.

In May 2026, she competed at the 2026 Asian Weightlifting Championships and won a gold medal in the snatch with a world record of 112 kg. She also won silver medals in the clean and jerk with a lift of 139 kg and total of 251 kg, both junior world records.

In September 2026, she competed at the 2026 Asian Games and won a gold medal in the 61 kg event with a snatch of 112 kg, a clean and jerk of 139 kg, and a total of 251 kg. She set new junior world records in the snatch, clean and jerk and total. She also set an Asian Games record and world record with her snatch and total.
