= Mohamed Ehab =

Egyptian weightlifter (born 1989)

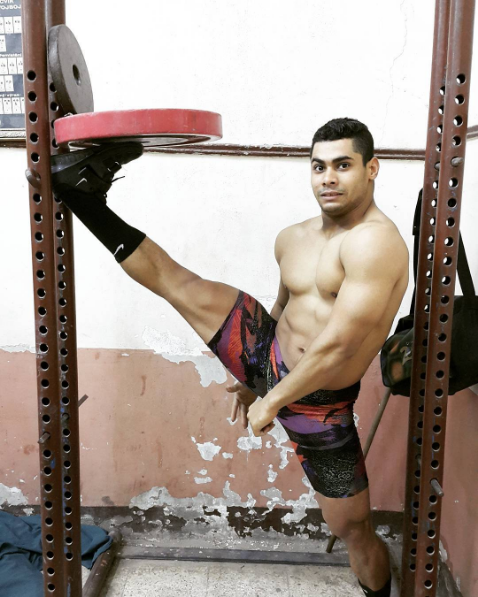

Personal information
- Full name: Mohamed Ehab Youssef Ahmed Mahmoud
- Nationality: Egypt
- Born: 21 November 1989 (age 36) Faiyum, Egypt
- Height: 1.65 m (5 ft 5 in)
- Weight: 80.72 kg (178 lb)

Sport
- Country: Egypt
- Sport: Weightlifting
- Event: –81 kg

Achievements and titles
- Personal bests: Snatch: 173 kg (2018); Clean and jerk: 201 kg (2015); Total: 373 kg (2018)
Medal record
Olympic Games
Bronze medal – third place	2016 Rio de Janeiro	–77 kg
World Championships
Gold medal – first place	2017 Anaheim	–77 kg
Silver medal – second place	2014 Almaty	–69 kg
Silver medal – second place	2015 Houston	–77 kg
Silver medal – second place	2018 Ashgabat	–81 kg
African Games
Gold medal – first place	2019 Rabat	–81 kg
Mediterranean Games
Gold medal – first place	2018 Tarragona	–77 kg
Islamic Solidarity Games
Gold medal – first place	2017 Baku	77 kg

Mohamed Ehab Youssef Ahmed Mahmoud (Arabic: مُحَمَّد إِيهَاب يُوسُف أَحْمَد مَحْمُود; born 21 November 1989), known as Mohamed Mahmoud or Mohamed Ehab, is an Egyptian weightlifter, and World Champion competing in the 77 kg category until 2018 and 81 kg starting in 2018 after the International Weightlifting Federation reorganized the categories.

== Early life ==
Ehab was born in Faiyum, Egypt a city located 100 kilometers southwest from Cairo. He was introduced to weightlifting by his father. Ehab started training with a coach at the age of 8 after his brother took him to a weightlifting gym. He went on to join the Egyptian national team at the age of 15 at a body weight of 56 kg. Ehab's biggest influence in weightlifting was his father, after his passing Mohamed decided to dedicate his life to the sport.

== Career ==
=== Olympics ===
At the 2016 Summer Olympics he competed in the men's 77 kg weight class, getting third place for the snatch and second place for clean & jerk, giving him a third place which was upgraded to silver in 2022 when the gold medalist was disqualified.

However, in July 2024, he was reported as having tested positive for chlorodehydromethyltestosterone in a retest of his 2016 Olympic Games sample. As of May 2025 the case has not been concluded.

=== World Championships ===
In 2014 he won the silver medal in the Total for the 69 kg weight-class in the 2014 World Weightlifting Championships, lifting 334 kg. He also won a bronze medal in the Snatch (152 kg) and silver in the Clean & Jerk (182 kg).

In the following year he competed in the 77 kg weight-class at the 2015 World Weightlifting Championships in Houston, winning a bronze medal in the total initially. The original silver medalist Kim Kwang-song failed a drug test and his lifts were disqualified, giving Ihab the silver medal to go along with a silver medal in the clean & jerk.

In 2017 he competed at the 2017 World Weightlifting Championships in the 77 kg category. He became World Champion, winning gold medals in all lifts, giving Egypt its first overall gold medal at the World Weightlifting Championships since Said Khalifa Gouda and Ibrahim Shams won gold medals in 1951.

In 2018 the International Weightlifting Federation reorganized the categories and Ihab competed in the newly created 81 kg category. In the snatch portion of the competition he lifted a new world record of 173 kg, which exceeded the world record set by Lü Xiaojun minutes earlier, this secured him the gold medal in the snatch. With his first two attempts of 196 kg and 200 kg in the clean & jerk portion he set two new world records of 369 kg and 373 kg in the total. This was not enough to win gold as Lü Xiaojun lifted 202 kg, giving him a 1 kg lead over Ihab as he won the silver medal.

In September 2019, Egypt was banned from participating in IWF competitions for two years due to doping offenses. Therefore, Ehab was not able to compete in the 2019 IWF championship and Tokyo 2020. In December 2021, he returned to competition in IWF world champions in Tashkent, Uzbekistan. He missed two of his snatch attempts. For the clean and jerk, he withdrew from the competition due to a shoulder injury.

== Major results ==
Year	Venue	Weight	Snatch (kg)				Clean & Jerk (kg)				Total	Rank
Year	Venue	Weight	1	2	3	Rank	1	2	3	Rank	Total	Rank
Olympic Games
2016	Rio de Janeiro, Brazil	77 kg	160	165	~~168~~	5	~~196~~	196	~~203~~	3	361	3rd place, bronze medalist(s)
World Championships
2014	Almaty, Kazakhstan	69 kg	145	149	152	3rd place, bronze medalist(s)	~~177~~	177	182	2nd place, silver medalist(s)	334	2nd place, silver medalist(s)
2015	Houston, United States	77 kg	157	162	~~166~~	6	193	197	201	2nd place, silver medalist(s)	363	2nd place, silver medalist(s)
2017	Anaheim, United States	77 kg	160	165	~~168~~	1st place, gold medalist(s)	~~191~~	191	196	1st place, gold medalist(s)	361	1st place, gold medalist(s)
2018	Ashgabat, Turkmenistan	81 kg	165	170	173 WR	1st place, gold medalist(s)	196	200	~~203~~	3rd place, bronze medalist(s)	373 WR	2nd place, silver medalist(s)
Mediterranean Games
2018	Tarragona, Spain	77 kg	158	162	~~166~~	1st place, gold medalist(s)	186	190	~~196~~	1st place, gold medalist(s)	352	1st place, gold medalist(s)
