= Weightlifting at the 2017 Bolivarian Games =

- Dates: 18–22 November 2017
- Nations: 11

Weightlifting, for the 2017 Bolivarian Games, took place from 18 November to 22 November 2017. Colombia took 28 gold medals to win the event.

== Medal table ==
* Host nation (Colombia)

| Rank | Nation | Gold | Silver | Bronze | Total |
|---|---|---|---|---|---|
| 1 | Colombia (COL)* | 28 | 11 | 5 | 44 |
| 2 | Venezuela (VEN) | 14 | 9 | 11 | 34 |
| 3 | Ecuador (ECU) | 4 | 21 | 21 | 46 |
| 4 | Chile (CHI) | 2 | 1 | 0 | 3 |
| 5 | Peru (PER) | 0 | 6 | 8 | 14 |
| 6 | Paraguay (PAR) | 0 | 0 | 3 | 3 |
| Totals (6 entries) | | 48 | 48 | 48 | 144 |

== Medalists ==
- PR – Pan American record

=== Men ===
| Event | Gold | | Silver | | Bronze | |
|---|---|---|---|---|---|---|
| 56 kg snatch | Carlos Berna; Colombia | 113 kg | Marcos Rojas; Peru | 106 kg | Rafael Ferruzola; Ecuador | 102 kg |
| 56 kg clean & jerk | Carlos Berna; Colombia | 147 kg | Marcos Rojas; Peru | 134 kg | Rafael Ferruzola; Ecuador | 133 kg |
| 56 kg total | Carlos Berna; Colombia | 260 kg | Marcos Rojas; Peru | 240 kg | Rafael Ferruzola; Ecuador | 235 kg |
| 62 kg snatch | Francisco Mosquera; Colombia | 131 kg | Cristhian Zurita; Ecuador | 125 kg | Jesús López; Venezuela | 117 kg |
| 62 kg clean & jerk | Francisco Mosquera; Colombia | 170 kg | Jesús López; Venezuela | 151 kg | Cristhian Zurita; Ecuador | 150 kg |
| 62 kg total | Francisco Mosquera; Colombia | 301 kg | Cristhian Zurita; Ecuador | 275 kg | Jesús López; Venezuela | 268 kg |
| 69 kg snatch | Julio Mayora; Venezuela | 147 kg | Óscar Terrones; Peru | 130 kg | Erik Herrera; Ecuador | 130 kg |
| 69 kg clean & jerk | Julio Mayora; Venezuela | 170 kg | Erik Herrera; Ecuador | 167 kg | Walter Beleno; Colombia | 165 kg |
| 69 kg total | Julio Mayora; Venezuela | 317 kg | Erik Herrera; Ecuador | 296 kg | Óscar Terrones; Peru | 292 kg |
| 77 kg snatch | Brayan Rodallegas; Colombia | 155 kg | Andrés Caicedo; Colombia | 151 kg | Ricardo Flores; Ecuador | 144 kg |
| 77 kg clean & jerk | Andrés Caicedo; Colombia | 192 kg | Brayan Rodallegas; Colombia | 185 kg | Darvin Castro; Venezuela | 181 kg |
| 77 kg total | Andrés Caicedo; Colombia | 343 kg | Brayan Rodallegas; Colombia | 340 kg | Darvin Castro; Venezuela | 324 kg |
| 85 kg snatch * | Angel José Luna; Venezuela | 157 kg | Diego Betancur; Colombia | 156 kg | Juan Prietos; Paraguay | 110 kg |
| 85 kg clean & jerk * | Angel José Luna; Venezuela | 190 kg | Diego Betancur; Colombia | 185 kg | Juan Prietos; Paraguay | 135 kg |
| 85 kg total * | Angel José Luna; Venezuela | 347 kg | Diego Betancur; Colombia | 341 kg | Juan Prietos; Paraguay | 245 kg |
| 94 kg snatch | Andrés Serna; Colombia | 160 kg | Yeison Arias; Venezuela | 157 kg | Paul Ferrin; Ecuador | 155 kg |
| 94 kg clean & jerk | Yeison Arias; Venezuela | 200 kg | Paul Ferrin; Ecuador | 196 kg | Andrés Serna; Colombia | 195 kg |
| 94 kg total | Yeison Arias; Venezuela | 357 kg | Andrés Serna; Colombia | 355 kg | Paul Ferrin; Ecuador | 351 kg |
| 105 kg snatch | Jorge Arroyo; Ecuador | 180 kg | Jesús González; Venezuela | 171 kg | Wilmer Contreras; Ecuador | 155 kg |
| 105 kg clean & jerk | Jesús González; Venezuela | 203 kg | Jorge Arroyo; Ecuador | 193 kg | Wilmer Contreras; Ecuador | 185 kg |
| 105 kg total | Jesús González; Venezuela | 374 kg | Jorge Arroyo; Ecuador | 373 kg | Wilmer Contreras; Ecuador | 340 kg |
| +105 kg snatch | Fredy Renteria; Colombia | 174 kg | Anderson Calero; Ecuador | 173 kg | Hernán Viera; Peru | 150 kg |
| +105 kg clean & jerk | Fredy Renteria; Colombia | 207 kg | Hernán Viera; Peru | 206 kg | Anderson Calero; Ecuador | 202 kg |
| +105 kg total | Fredy Renteria; Colombia | 381 kg | Anderson Calero; Ecuador | 375 kg | Hernán Viera; Peru | 356 kg |

* In 85 kg, originally Arley Méndez won a gold medal in all three events (snatch: 171 kg, clean & jerk: 211 kg and total: 382 kg), but after the competition the Venezuelan team protest against him, because he not held his Chilean passport long enough to be eligible at the Bolivarian Games.

=== Women ===
| Event | Gold | | Silver | | Bronze | |
|---|---|---|---|---|---|---|
| 48 kg snatch | Ana Segura; Colombia | 80 kg | Elizabeth Camacho; Venezuela | 74 kg | Angélica Campoverde; Ecuador | 73 kg |
| 48 kg clean & jerk | Ana Segura; Colombia | 100 kg | Angélica Campoverde; Ecuador | 92 kg | Fiorella Cueva; Peru | 91 kg |
| 48 kg total | Ana Segura; Colombia | 180 kg | Angélica Campoverde; Ecuador | 165 kg | Elizabeth Camacho; Venezuela | 161 kg |
| 53 kg snatch | Yenny Sinisterra; Colombia | 80 kg | Tessy Sandi; Peru | 77 kg | Cinthya Sanmartin; Ecuador | 76 kg |
| 53 kg clean & jerk | Yenny Sinisterra; Colombia | 99 kg | Cinthya Sanmartin; Ecuador | 98 kg | Tessy Sandi; Peru | 96 kg |
| 53 kg total | Yenny Sinisterra; Colombia | 179 kg | Cinthya Sanmartin; Ecuador | 174 kg | Tessy Sandi; Peru | 173 kg |
| 58 kg snatch | Alexandra Escobar; Ecuador | 98 kg | María Lobón; Colombia | 97 kg | Karool Blanco; Colombia | 93 kg |
| 58 kg clean & jerk | Alexandra Escobar; Ecuador | 118 kg | María Lobón; Colombia | 117 kg | Karool Blanco; Colombia | 116 kg |
| 58 kg total | Alexandra Escobar; Ecuador | 216 kg | María Lobón; Colombia | 214 kg | Karool Blanco; Colombia | 209 kg |
| 63 kg snatch | Lina Rivas; Colombia | 105 kg | Mercedes Pérez; Colombia | 100 kg | Yurleidys Arriola; Venezuela | 85 kg |
| 63 kg clean & jerk | Lina Rivas; Colombia | 125 kg | Yurleidys Arriola; Venezuela | 105 kg | Angie Cárdenas; Peru | 103 kg |
| 63 kg total | Lina Rivas; Colombia | 230 kg | Yurleidys Arriola; Venezuela | 190 kg | Eldi Paredes; Peru | 185 kg |
| 69 kg snatch | Miyareth Mendoza; Colombia | 105 kg | Angie Palacios; Ecuador | 98 kg | Laura Peinado; Venezuela | 90 kg |
| 69 kg clean & jerk | Miyareth Mendoza; Colombia | 126 kg | Laura Peinado; Venezuela | 121 kg | Angie Palacios; Ecuador | 120 kg |
| 69 kg total | Miyareth Mendoza; Colombia | 231 kg | Angie Palacios; Ecuador | 218 kg | Laura Peinado; Venezuela | 211 kg |
| 75 kg snatch | Leydi Solís; Colombia | 108 kg | Neisi Dájomes; Ecuador | 107 kg | Tamara Salazar; Ecuador | 100 kg |
| 75 kg clean & jerk | Leydi Solís; Colombia | 135 kg | Neisi Dájomes; Ecuador | 130 kg | Tamara Salazar; Ecuador | 128 kg |
| 75 kg total | Leydi Solís; Colombia | 243 kg | Neisi Dájomes; Ecuador | 237 kg | Tamara Salazar; Ecuador | 228 kg |
| 90 kg snatch | Naryury Pérez; Venezuela | 112 kg | María Fernanda Valdés; Chile | 111 kg | Oliba Nieve; Ecuador | 105 kg |
| 90 kg clean & jerk | María Fernanda Valdés; Chile | 142 kg | Naryury Pérez; Venezuela | 132 kg | Oliba Nieve; Ecuador | 127 kg |
| 90 kg total | María Fernanda Valdés; Chile | 253 kg | Naryury Pérez; Venezuela | 244 kg | Oliba Nieve; Ecuador | 232 kg |
| +90 kg snatch | Yaniuska Espinosa; Venezuela | 117 kg | Lisseth Ayoví; Ecuador | 111 kg | Mirufay Morillo; Venezuela | 110 kg |
| +90 kg clean & jerk | Yaniuska Espinosa; Venezuela | 141 kg | Lisseth Ayoví; Ecuador | 140 kg | Mirufay Morillo; Venezuela | 114 kg |
| +90 kg total | Yaniuska Espinosa; Venezuela | 258 kg | Lisseth Ayoví; Ecuador | 251 kg | Mirufay Morillo; Venezuela | 214 kg |
