= Darvin Castro =

Venezuelan weightlifter (born 1995)

Personal information
- Full name: Darvin Jesus Castro Palma
- Born: 1995 (age 30–31)

Sport
- Country: Venezuela
- Sport: Weightlifting
- Weight class: 81 kg
Medal record
Men's weightlifting
Representing Venezuela
Pan American Championships
Gold medal – first place	2023 Bariloche	81 kg
Silver medal – second place	2021 Guayaquil	81 kg
Silver medal – second place	2022 Bogotá	81 kg
South American Games
Bronze medal – third place	2022 Asunción	81 kg
Bolivarian Games
Gold medal – first place	2022 Valledupar	81 kg S
Gold medal – first place	2022 Valledupar	81 kg CJ
Bronze medal – third place	2017 Santa Marta	77 kg CJ
Bronze medal – third place	2017 Santa Marta	77 kg

Darvin Jesus Castro Palma (born 1995) is a Venezuelan weightlifter. He is a three-time medalist, including gold, at the Pan American Weightlifting Championships. He is also a two-time gold medalist at the 2022 Bolivarian Games held in Valledupar, Colombia.

== Career ==
In 2017, Castro won two bronze medals at the Bolivarian Games held in Santa Marta, Colombia.

He won the silver medal in the men's 81 kg event at the 2022 Pan American Weightlifting Championships held in Bogotá, Colombia. He also won the silver medal in this event at the 2021 Pan American Weightlifting Championships held in Guayaquil, Ecuador.

Castro won two gold medals at the 2022 Bolivarian Games held in Valledupar, Colombia. He won the bronze medal in the men's 81 kg event at the 2022 South American Games held in Asunción, Paraguay. He competed in the men's 81 kg event at the 2022 World Weightlifting Championships in Bogotá, Colombia.

Castro won the gold medal in his event at the 2023 Pan American Weightlifting Championships held in Bariloche, Argentina. He also won the gold medal in the Snatch and Clean & Jerk events.

== Achievements ==
Year	Venue	Weight	Snatch (kg)				Clean & Jerk (kg)				Total	Rank
Year	Venue	Weight	1	2	3	Rank	1	2	3	Rank	Total	Rank
World Championships
2022	Bogotá, Colombia	81 kg	140	~~145~~	145	14	180	~~186~~	~~186~~	12	325	12
Pan American Championships
2017	Miami, United States	77 kg	137	142	~~146~~	5	168	173	~~179~~	6	315	6
2018	Santo Domingo, Dominican Republic	77 kg	~~140~~	140	144	5	170	~~175~~	~~175~~	6	314	6
2021	Guayaquil, Ecuador	81 kg	145	149	~~152~~	4	178	183	186	2nd place, silver medalist(s)	335	2nd place, silver medalist(s)
2022	Bogotá, Colombia	81 kg	140	145	147	1st place, gold medalist(s)	177	~~182~~	~~182~~	2nd place, silver medalist(s)	324	2nd place, silver medalist(s)
2023	Bariloche, Argentina	81 kg	141	144	~~148~~	1st place, gold medalist(s)	175	180	—	1st place, gold medalist(s)	324	1st place, gold medalist(s)
South American Games
2022	Asunción, Paraguay	81 kg	142	~~145~~	~~147~~	—N/a	179	~~187~~	~~187~~	—N/a	321	3rd place, bronze medalist(s)
Bolivarian Games
2017	Santa Marta, Colombia	77 kg	140	~~143~~	143	4	176	181	~~185~~	3rd place, bronze medalist(s)	324	3rd place, bronze medalist(s)
2022	Valledupar, Colombia	81 kg	135	145	—	1st place, gold medalist(s)	176	181	184	1st place, gold medalist(s)	—N/a	—N/a
