= 2026 World Weightlifting Championships – Women's 61 kg =

Women's 61 kg at the 2026 World Weightlifting Championships
- Venue: Ningbo Olympic Sports Center
- Location: Ningbo, China
- Dates: 1 November
- Competitors: 40 from 34 nations
- Winning total: 254 kg WR

Medalists
gold medal	Pei Xinyi	China
silver medal	Yang Liuyue	China
bronze medal	Pak Jin-hae	North Korea

The women's 61 kilograms competition at the 2026 World Weightlifting Championships was held on 1 November 2026.

== Schedule ==
Date	Time	Event
1 November 2026	11:00	Group D
1 November 2026	13:30	Group C
1 November 2026	16:00	Group B
1 November 2026	19:00	Group A

== Records ==
Prior to this competition, the existing world records were as follows.

World record	Snatch	Yang Liuyue (CHN)	112 kg	Nagoya, Japan	25 September 2026
World record	Clean & Jerk	Pak Jin-hae (PRK)	139 kg	Nagoya, Japan	25 September 2026
World record	Total	Yang Liuyue (CHN)	251 kg	Nagoya, Japan	25 September 2026

== Results ==
Rank	Athlete	Group	Snatch (kg)				Clean & Jerk (kg)				Total
Rank	Athlete	Group	1	2	3	Rank	1	2	3	Rank	Total
1st place, gold medalist(s)	Pei Xinyi (CHN)	A	106	109	112	1st place, gold medalist(s)	135	140	142; WR	1st place, gold medalist(s)	254; WR
2nd place, silver medalist(s)	Yang Liuyue (CHN)	A	106	110	~~113~~	3rd place, bronze medalist(s)	135	139	~~145~~	2nd place, silver medalist(s)	249
3rd place, bronze medalist(s)	Pak Jin-hae (PRK)	A	105	~~109~~	~~109~~	4	~~135~~	135	138	3rd place, bronze medalist(s)	243
4	Kuo Hsing-chun (TPE)	A	100	102	104	7	130	133	137	4	241
5	Karen Mosquera (COL)	A	105	109	111	2nd place, silver medalist(s)	~~125~~	125	~~130~~	11	236
6	Katharine Estep (USA)	A	100	~~103~~	104	8	~~128~~	128	130	5	234
7	Maude Charron (CAN)	A	99	103	105	5	126	~~130~~	~~130~~	9	231
8	Kamila Konotop (UKR)	A	103	~~106~~	~~106~~	9	120	125	~~129~~	10	228
9	Elreen Ando (PHI)	A	~~99~~	~~99~~	99	13	125	128	~~131~~	8	227
10	Suratwadee Yodsarn (THA)	B	94	98	~~101~~	14	124	128	~~132~~	7	226
11	Thanaporn Saetia (THA)	B	~~95~~	~~95~~	95	23	120	125	129	6	224
12	Maëlyn Michel (FRA)	B	96	99	102	10	114	118	~~121~~	18	220
13	Ann-Sophie Taschereau (CAN)	C	94	97	100	11	115	119	~~122~~	17	219
14	Alina Shchapanava (BLR)	B	94	97	~~100~~	18	115	120	~~124~~	14	217
15	Aysel Özkan (TUR)	B	~~97~~	97	~~100~~	19	115	~~120~~	120	15	217
16	Natasya Beteyob (INA)	B	~~95~~	~~95~~	95	22	117	~~122~~	122	12	217
17	Olga Te (RUS)	C	94	97	99	12	~~111~~	111	116	19	215
18	Andreea Cotruța (ROU)	B	95	98	~~100~~	15	116	~~120~~	~~121~~	21	214
19	Usha (IND)	D	90	~~93~~	93	24	115	119	~~121~~	16	212
20	Riri Endo (JPN)	C	92	95	97	16	111	~~115~~	115	22	212
21	Nirupama Devi Seram (IND)	C	~~91~~	91	~~93~~	27	120	~~124~~	~~124~~	13	211
22	Rebeka Ibrahima (LAT)	B	96	~~98~~	~~98~~	20	115	—	—	23	211
23	Lucrezia Magistris (ITA)	B	93	97	~~100~~	17	~~112~~	~~112~~	112	27	209
24	Jenifer Becerra (ECU)	B	~~92~~	~~92~~	93	25	114	~~118~~	~~120~~	24	207
25	Alicia Feliz (DOM)	C	90	~~94~~	~~94~~	29	113	~~116~~	116	20	206
26	Femily-Crystie Notte (NRU)	C	91	95; WYR	~~98~~	21	110	~~113~~	~~113~~	30	205
27	Issi Agrait (PUR)	D	88	~~91~~	91	26	110	~~115~~	~~120~~	28	201
28	Joseline López (MEX)	C	86	89	~~91~~	31	110	~~113~~	—	29	199
29	Sabine Kusterer (LUX)	D	77	81	85	33	102	108	113	25	198
30	Veronika Honcharova (AUT)	D	86	90	~~92~~	28	103	107	~~110~~	31	197
31	Katla Björk Ketilsdóttir (ISL)	D	86	~~90~~	~~90~~	32	100	103	~~107~~	32	189
32	Molly Coffey O'Connor (IRL)	D	~~77~~	77	~~80~~	34	~~98~~	98	~~101~~	34	175
33	Maha Fajreslam (MAR)	D	72	76	~~79~~	35	90	96	~~100~~	35	172
34	Mai Al-Madani (UAE)	D	68	71	~~73~~	36	81	~~84~~	84	37	155
35	Cheng Ching To (HKG)	D	64	~~67~~	68	37	80	84	~~88~~	36	152
36	Al-Zahraa Kamshad (KUW)	D	~~53~~	53	58	38	70	~~75~~	75	38	133
—	Sophia Shaft (USA)	A	~~105~~	~~105~~	105	6	~~130~~	~~130~~	~~130~~	—	—
—	Wiktoria Wołk (POL)	C	~~88~~	~~88~~	~~88~~	—	105	110	113	26	—
—	Paula Zikowsky (AUT)	C	~~87~~	~~87~~	~~87~~	—	~~103~~	~~103~~	103	33	—
—	Quàng Thị Tâm (VIE)	C	90	~~93~~	~~93~~	30	—	—	—	—	—
—	María Olalla (ESP)	C	Did not start								
—	Sumaiya Akter Israt (BAN)	D	Did not start								
