= 2022 World Weightlifting Championships – Women's 64 kg =

The women's 64 kilograms competition at the 2022 World Weightlifting Championships was held on 10 December 2022.

== Schedule ==
Date	Time	Event
10 December 2022	16:30	Group B
10 December 2022	19:00	Group A

== Medalists ==
Event	Gold		Silver		Bronze	
Snatch	Pei Xinyi (CHN)	105 kg	Natalia Llamosa (COL)	101 kg	Rattanawan Wamalun (THA)	101 kg
Clean & Jerk	Pei Xinyi (CHN)	128 kg	Rattanawan Wamalun (THA)	126 kg	Natalia Llamosa (COL)	123 kg
Total	Pei Xinyi (CHN)	233 kg	Rattanawan Wamalun (THA)	227 kg	Natalia Llamosa (COL)	224 kg

== Records ==
Prior to this competition, the existing world records were as follows.

World Record	Snatch	Deng Wei (CHN)	117 kg	Tianjin, China	11 December 2019
World Record	Clean & Jerk	Deng Wei (CHN)	145 kg	Pattaya, Thailand	22 September 2019
World Record	Total	Deng Wei (CHN)	261 kg	Pattaya, Thailand	22 September 2019

== Results ==
Rank	Athlete	Group	Snatch (kg)				Clean & Jerk (kg)				Total
Rank	Athlete	Group	1	2	3	Rank	1	2	3	Rank	Total
1st place, gold medalist(s)	Pei Xinyi (CHN)	A	100	103	105	1st place, gold medalist(s)	125	128	~~135~~	1st place, gold medalist(s)	233
2nd place, silver medalist(s)	Rattanawan Wamalun (THA)	A	97	101	~~104~~	3rd place, bronze medalist(s)	126	~~129~~	~~129~~	2nd place, silver medalist(s)	227
3rd place, bronze medalist(s)	Natalia Llamosa (COL)	A	101	~~103~~	~~104~~	2nd place, silver medalist(s)	121	123	~~127~~	3rd place, bronze medalist(s)	224
4	Ana Lilia Durán (MEX)	A	92	96	99	5	~~122~~	122	~~126~~	5	221
5	Julieth Rodríguez (COL)	A	99	~~102~~	~~102~~	4	~~121~~	121	~~124~~	6	220
6	Sarah Cochrane (AUS)	A	93	98	~~101~~	6	~~113~~	113	~~118~~	12	211
7	Daniela Gherman (SWE)	A	91	94	96	7	111	~~114~~	115	10	211
8	Ganzorigiin Anuujin (MGL)	A	~~94~~	94	~~102~~	9	115	~~119~~	~~125~~	9	209
9	Zoe Smith (GBR)	A	88	~~91~~	91	12	118	~~122~~	~~124~~	7	209
10	Kiana Elliott (AUS)	B	90	93	95	8	~~108~~	108	111	13	206
11	Akane Yoshida (JPN)	B	87	~~91~~	~~91~~	14	110	115	~~120~~	8	202
12	Marit Årdalsbakke (NOR)	B	88	91	~~94~~	11	~~105~~	105	~~109~~	16	196
13	Anni Vuohijoki (FIN)	B	87	~~89~~	~~90~~	13	106	~~110~~	~~111~~	15	193
14	Alexa Mina (LBN)	B	80	83	~~86~~	15	100	104	~~107~~	17	187
15	Helena Rønnebæk (DEN)	B	80	83	~~86~~	16	102	~~106~~	~~107~~	18	185
16	Ivana Gorišek (CRO)	B	73	77	~~80~~	17	88	~~93~~	93	19	170
17	Delice Adonis (GUY)	B	58	63	66	18	70	75	~~80~~	20	141
18	Lydia Nakkide (UGA)	B	55	~~60~~	60	19	70	~~75~~	~~75~~	21	130
—	Vicky Graillot (FRA)	A	89	92	~~94~~	10	~~115~~	~~116~~	~~116~~	—	—
—	Phạm Thị Hồng Thanh (VIE)	A	~~100~~	~~100~~	~~101~~	—	115	119	123	4	—
—	Mariia Hanhur (UKR)	A	~~99~~	~~99~~	~~99~~	—	114	~~118~~	~~118~~	11	—
—	Mako Yamamoto (JPN)	B	~~88~~	~~88~~	~~88~~	—	106	~~108~~	108	14	—
—	Alexandra Escobar (ECU)	B	—	—	—	—	—	—	—	—	—
