= Rejepbaý Rejepow =

Turkmen weightlifter (born 1992)

Personal information
- Nationality: Turkmen
- Born: 23 February 1992 (age 34)
- Weight: 80.95 kg (178.5 lb)

Sport
- Country: Turkmenistan
- Sport: Weightlifting
- Event: 81 kg
Medal record
Representing Turkmenistan
Men's weightlifting
World Championships
Silver medal – second place	2017 Anaheim	77 kg
Silver medal – second place	2022 Bogotá	81 kg
Asian Indoor and Martial Arts Games
Gold medal – first place	2017 Ashgabat	77 kg
Asian Championships
Silver medal – second place	2017 Ashgabat	77 kg
Bronze medal – third place	2021 Tashkent	81 kg

Rejepbaý Rejepow (born 23 February 1992) is a Turkmen weightlifter. He is a silver medalist at the 2017 World Weightlifting Championships in Anaheim, United States and the 2022 World Weightlifting Championships in Bogotá, Colombia. Rejepow is also a distinguished athlete of the State Migration Service of Turkmenistan. He competed in the men's 81 kg at the 2020 Summer Olympics held in Tokyo, Japan.

He won the gold medal in the men's 77 kg event at the 2017 Asian Indoor and Martial Arts Games held in Ashgabat, Turkmenistan.

== Major results ==
Year	Venue	Weight	Snatch (kg)				Clean & Jerk (kg)				Total	Rank
Year	Venue	Weight	1	2	3	Rank	1	2	3	Rank	Total	Rank
Representing Turkmenistan
World Championships
2015	Houston, United States	77 kg	~~154~~	~~154~~	~~155~~	—	—	—	—	—	—	—
2017	Anaheim, United States	77 kg	~~158~~	158	~~161~~	2nd place, silver medalist(s)	188	190	194	2nd place, silver medalist(s)	352	2nd place, silver medalist(s)
2018	Ashgabat, Turkmenistan	81 kg	160	~~166~~	166	5	~~196~~	197	~~203~~	5	363	4
2022	Bogotá, Colombia	81 kg	164	~~168~~	~~169~~	2nd place, silver medalist(s)	195	202	~~209~~	1st place, gold medalist(s)	366	2nd place, silver medalist(s)
Asian Games
2014	Incheon, South Korea	77 kg	155	160	~~163~~	4	185	~~190~~	~~194~~	4	345	4
Asian Championships
2012	Pyeongtaek, South Korea	77 kg	135	140	~~143~~	5	~~160~~	~~160~~	~~162~~	—	—	—
2017	Ashgabat, Turkmenistan	77 kg	149	154	158	2nd place, silver medalist(s)	180	~~185~~	185	5	343	2nd place, silver medalist(s)
2021	Tashkent, Uzbekistan	81 kg	~~155~~	156	~~161~~	5	185	~~195~~	~~198~~	4	341	3rd place, bronze medalist(s)
Universiade
2013	Kazan, Russia	77 kg	~~150~~	150	~~156~~	8	~~175~~	180	~~188~~	10	330	9
