= Weightlifting at the 2016 Summer Olympics – Men's 77 kg =

Men's 77 kg at the Games of the XXXI Olympiad
- Venue: Riocentro
- Date: 10 August 2016
- Competitors: 13 from 13 nations
- Winning total: 379 kg

Medalists
1st place, gold medalist(s)		vacant	
2nd place, silver medalist(s)		Lü Xiaojun	China
3rd place, bronze medalist(s)		Mohamed Ehab	Egypt

The Men's 77 kg weightlifting competitions at the 2016 Summer Olympics in Rio de Janeiro took place on 10 August at Pavilion 2 of Riocentro. Nijat Rahimov originally won the gold medal but was disqualified in March 2022 by the Court of Arbitration for Sport for a doping violation (urine substitutions in the weeks before the Games). As of March 2022, medals for this event have not been reallocated, a process that could extend to 2024. If reallocated, Lü Xiaojun would be awarded his third Olympic weightlifting gold medal, adding to his victories in 2012 and 2020.

== Schedule ==
All times are Time in Brazil (UTC-03:00)

Date	Time	Event
10 August 2016	10:00	Group B
10 August 2016	19:00	Group A

== Records ==
Before this competition, the existing world and Olympic records were as follows.

World record	Snatch	Lü Xiaojun (CHN)	176 kg	Wrocław, Poland	24 October 2013
World record	Clean & Jerk	Oleg Perepetchenov (RUS)	210 kg	Trenčín, Slovakia	27 April 2001
World record	Total	Lü Xiaojun (CHN)	380 kg	Wrocław, Poland	24 October 2013
Olympic record	Snatch	Lü Xiaojun (CHN)	175 kg	London, United Kingdom	1 August 2012
Olympic record	Clean & Jerk	Zhan Xugang (CHN)	207 kg	Sydney, Australia	22 September 2000
Olympic record	Total	Lü Xiaojun (CHN)	379 kg	London, United Kingdom	1 August 2012

== Results ==
Rank	Athlete	Group	Body weight	Snatch (kg)				Clean & Jerk (kg)				Total
Rank	Athlete	Group	Body weight	1	2	3	Result	1	2	3	Result	Total
(silver) ^{[1]}	Lü Xiaojun (CHN)	A	76.83	170	175	177	177 WR	~~197~~	197	202	202	379
(bronze) ^{[1]}	Mohamed Ehab (EGY)	A	76.69	160	165	~~168~~	165 AF	~~196~~	196	~~203~~	196	361
4^{[1]}	Chatuphum Chinnawong (THA)	A	76.52	160	~~165~~	165	165	~~191~~	~~191~~	191	191	356
5	Alexandru Șpac (MDA)	A	76.52	150	155	~~158~~	155	185	190	192	192	347
6	Andrés Caicedo (COL)	B	76.26	~~150~~	150	155	155	191	~~197~~	~~197~~	191	346
7	Andrés Mata (ESP)	B	76.32	145	150	153	153	185	~~190~~	190	190	343
8	Choe Jon-wi (PRK)	A	76.54	153	~~157~~	~~158~~	153	184	190	~~194~~	190	343
9	Ibrahim Abdelbaki (EGY)	A	76.90	147	~~152~~	152	152	~~186~~	186	~~192~~	186	338
10	Nico Müller (GER)	B	76.70	145	149	151	151	177	181	~~185~~	181	332
11	Sathish Sivalingam (IND)	B	76.96	143	148	~~153~~	148	176	181	~~186~~	181	329
12	Deni (INA)	B	69.38	140	146	~~149~~	146	172	177	~~181~~	177	323
–	Andranik Karapetyan (ARM)	A	76.75	170	174	~~176~~	174 ER	~~195~~	~~195~~	–	DNF	DNF
–	Dumitru Captari (ROU)	B	76.68	145	~~150~~	~~150~~	145	–	–	–	DNF	DNF
DSQ^{[1]}	~~Nijat Rahimov~~ (KAZ)	A	76.19	160	165	~~168~~	~~165~~	202	214	–	~~214 WR~~	~~379~~

^{1} Rahimov originally won the gold medal but was disqualified in March 2022 by the Court of Arbitration for Sport after a doping violation. IOC has not yet redistributed the medals.

== New records ==
Snatch	177 kg	Lü Xiaojun (CHN)	OR, WR
Clean & Jerk	~~214 kg~~	~~Nijat Rahimov (KAZ)~~	~~OR, WR~~
