= Alexandru Șpac =

Moldovan weightlifter (born 1989)

Alexandru Şpac
Personal information
- Nationality: Moldovans
- Born: 21 November 1989 (age 36)
- Height: 5 ft 5 in (165 cm)
- Weight: 77 kg (170 lb)

Sport
- Country: Moldova
- Sport: Weightlifting
- Weight class: 77 kg
Medal record
Men's weightlifting
Representing Moldova
European Championships
Disqualified	2013 Tirana	–77 kg
Bronze medal – third place	2012 Antalya	–77 kg
European U23 Weightlifting Championships
Silver medal – second place	2010 Limassol	–69 kg
- Updated on 10 August 2016

Alexandru Şpac (born 21 November 1989) is a Moldovan weightlifter.

== Career ==
Şpac won the bronze medal at the 2012 European Weightlifting Championships in the –77 kg category. At the 2013 European Weightlifting Championships, Şpac finished second. However, he was later disqualified after testing positive for Stanozolol and Methyltestosterone. As a result of the doping violation, Şpac was suspended for 2 years by the International Weightlifting Federation.

He competed at the 2016 Summer Olympics in the –77 kg event, where he finished 5th. He is currently a Physical Education (PE) Teacher at the "Mihai Eminescu" Lyceum in Bălți, Moldova.

In 2025, Șpac was issued with a seven-year ban for an anti-doping rule violation for testing positive for dehydrochloromethyltestosterone in re-analysed samples collected in 2016 during the Rio Olympics. All of his results from 27 July 2016 were disqualified as part of the ruling.
