= Choe Jon-wi =

North Korean weightlifter (born 1993)

Personal information
- Nationality: North Korean
- Born: 29 June 1993 (age 32)
- Height: 1.70 m (5 ft 7 in)
- Weight: 77 kg (170 lb)

Sport
- Country: North Korea
- Sport: Weightlifting

Korean name
- Hangul: 최전위
- Hanja: 崔前衛
- RR: Choe Jeonwi
- MR: Ch'oe Chŏnwi

Choe Jon-wi (Korean pronunciation: [tsʰø.dzʌn.y] or [tsʰø] [tsʌn.y]; born June 29, 1993) is a North Korean Olympic weightlifter. He represented his country at the 2016 Summer Olympics. He finished in 8th place in the men's 77kg competition. He was the flagbearer for North Korea during the Parade of Nations.
