= 2022 World Weightlifting Championships =

2022 World Championships
- Host city: Bogotá, Colombia
- Athletes: 537
- Dates: 5–16 December
- Main venue: Gran Carpa Américas Corferias

The 2022 World Weightlifting Championships was a weightlifting competition held in Bogotá, Colombia in December 2022. It was scheduled to be held in Chongqing, China but this changed in March 2022 as a result of COVID-19 measures in China. The new location was announced in April 2022. It was the first time Colombia hosted the World Weightlifting Championships.

The event served as a qualification event for the 2024 Summer Olympics in Paris, France. Weightlifters from Russia and Belarus did not compete after a ban as a result of the Russian invasion of Ukraine. North Korea also did not compete after the International Weightlifting Federation (IWF) tightened its rules on anti-doping controls.

The IWF considered using two platforms instead of one at the competition but the venue proved to be unsuitable. During the competition, an increase in the number of no lift results was attributed by competitors and staff to the city's altitude above sea level with weightlifters experiencing difficulty in taking in enough oxygen.

== Schedule ==
Men's events
Date →	Tue 6		Wed 7		Thu 8	Fri 9				Sat 10		Sun 11				Mon 12				Tue 13		Thu 15		Fri 16		
Event ↓	09:30	19:00	11:30	16:30	14:00	11:30	14:00	16:30	19:00	11:30	14:30	11:30	14:00	16:30	19:00	09:00	14:00	16:30	21:30	11:30	19:00	14:00	19:00	11:30	14:00	16:30
55 kg	B	A																								
61 kg			B	A																						
67 kg					B			A																		
73 kg						C	B		A																	
81 kg											C	B		A												
89 kg										C			B		A											
96 kg																C	B	A								
102 kg																			C	B	A					
109 kg																						B	A			
+109 kg																								C	B	A

Women's events
Date →	Mon 5			Tue 6		Wed 7			Thu 8				Sat 10		Sun 11		Mon 12		Tue 13		Wed 14				Thu 15	
Event ↓	11:30	14:00	19:00	14:00	16:30	14:00	19:00	21:30	09:30	11:30	16:30	19:00	16:30	19:00	09:00	21:30	11:30	19:00	14:00	16:30	11:30	14:00	16:30	19:00	11:30	16:30
45 kg	B		A																							
49 kg	D	C		B	A																					
55 kg						B	A																			
59 kg								E	D	C	B	A														
64 kg													B	A												
71 kg															D	C	B	A								
76 kg																			B	A						
81 kg																					C	B	A			
87 kg																					B			A		
+87 kg																									B	A

== Medal summary ==
=== Men ===
Event	Gold		Silver		Bronze	
55 kg
Snatch	Lại Gia Thành; Vietnam	118 kg	Arli Chontey; Kazakhstan	118 kg	Ngô Sơn Đỉnh; Vietnam	117 kg
Clean & Jerk	Theerapong Silachai; Thailand	148 kg	Kim Yong-ho; South Korea	145 kg	Miguel Suárez; Colombia	143 kg
Total	Theerapong Silachai; Thailand	265 kg	Ngô Sơn Đỉnh; Vietnam	260 kg	Kim Yong-ho; South Korea	260 kg
61 kg
Snatch	Li Fabin; China	137 kg	He Yueji; China	136 kg	Eko Yuli Irawan; Indonesia	135 kg
Clean & Jerk	Li Fabin; China	175 kg WR	Eko Yuli Irawan; Indonesia	165 kg	Jhon Serna; Colombia	164 kg
Total	Li Fabin; China	312 kg	Eko Yuli Irawan; Indonesia	300 kg	He Yueji; China	296 kg
67 kg
Snatch	Chen Lijun; China	148 kg	Witsanu Chantri; Thailand	144 kg	Weeraphon Wichuma; Thailand	143 kg
Clean & Jerk	Yusuf Fehmi Genç; Turkey	182 kg	Francisco Mosquera; Colombia	182 kg	Weeraphon Wichuma; Thailand	180 kg
Total	Francisco Mosquera; Colombia	325 kg	Chen Lijun; China	324 kg	Weeraphon Wichuma; Thailand	323 kg
73 kg
Snatch	Rizki Juniansyah; Indonesia	155 kg	Bozhidar Andreev; Bulgaria	154 kg	Alexey Churkin; Kazakhstan	153 kg
Clean & Jerk	Rahmat Erwin Abdullah; Indonesia	200 kg WR	Rizki Juniansyah; Indonesia	192 kg	Alexey Churkin; Kazakhstan	190 kg
Total	Rahmat Erwin Abdullah; Indonesia	352 kg	Rizki Juniansyah; Indonesia	347 kg	Alexey Churkin; Kazakhstan	343 kg
81 kg
Snatch	Li Dayin; China	171 kg	Rejepbaý Rejepow; Turkmenistan	164 kg	Kim Woo-jae; South Korea	162 kg
Clean & Jerk	Rejepbaý Rejepow; Turkmenistan	202 kg	Li Dayin; China	201 kg	Andrés Caicedo; Colombia	197 kg
Total	Li Dayin; China	372 kg	Rejepbaý Rejepow; Turkmenistan	366 kg	Kim Woo-jae; South Korea	357 kg
89 kg
Snatch	Keydomar Vallenilla; Venezuela	175 kg	Kianoush Rostami; Iran	174 kg	Brayan Rodallegas; Colombia	170 kg
Clean & Jerk	Karlos Nasar; Bulgaria	220 kg WR	Liu Huanhua; China	215 kg	Brayan Rodallegas; Colombia	211 kg
Total	Keydomar Vallenilla; Venezuela	385 kg	Brayan Rodallegas; Colombia	381 kg	Liu Huanhua; China	381 kg
96 kg
Snatch	Lesman Paredes; Bahrain	185 kg	Nurgissa Adiletuly; Kazakhstan	174 kg	Jhor Moreno; Colombia	171 kg
Clean & Jerk	Romain Imadouchène; France	213 kg	Lesman Paredes; Bahrain	212 kg	Jhor Moreno; Colombia	209 kg
Total	Lesman Paredes; Bahrain	397 kg	Nurgissa Adiletuly; Kazakhstan	383 kg	Jhor Moreno; Colombia	380 kg
102 kg
Snatch	Reza Dehdar; Iran	177 kg	Marcos Ruiz; Spain	176 kg	Samvel Gasparyan; Armenia	175 kg
Clean & Jerk	Artyom Antropov; Kazakhstan	222 kg	Fares El-Bakh; Qatar	217 kg	Bekdoolot Rasulbekov; Kyrgyzstan	217 kg
Total	Fares El-Bakh; Qatar	391 kg	Reza Dehdar; Iran	390 kg	Samvel Gasparyan; Armenia	389 kg
109 kg
Snatch	Ruslan Nurudinov; Uzbekistan	177 kg	Mehdi Karami; Iran	176 kg	Aymen Bacha; Tunisia	175 kg
Clean & Jerk	Ruslan Nurudinov; Uzbekistan	220 kg	Giorgi Chkheidze; Georgia	219 kg	Rafael Cerro; Colombia	214 kg
Total	Ruslan Nurudinov; Uzbekistan	397 kg	Giorgi Chkheidze; Georgia	389 kg	Rafael Cerro; Colombia	388 kg
+109 kg
Snatch	Lasha Talakhadze; Georgia	215 kg	Varazdat Lalayan; Armenia	215 kg	Gor Minasyan; Bahrain	212 kg
Clean & Jerk	Lasha Talakhadze; Georgia	251 kg	Gor Minasyan; Bahrain	250 kg	Man Asaad; Syria	247 kg
Total	Lasha Talakhadze; Georgia	466 kg	Gor Minasyan; Bahrain	462 kg	Varazdat Lalayan; Armenia	461 kg

=== Women ===
Event	Gold		Silver		Bronze	
45 kg
Snatch	Thanyathon Sukcharoen; Thailand	82 kg	Chayuttra Pramongkhol; Thailand	78 kg	Manuela Berrío; Colombia	77 kg
Clean & Jerk	Chayuttra Pramongkhol; Thailand	102 kg	Thanyathon Sukcharoen; Thailand	100 kg	Manuela Berrío; Colombia	93 kg
Total	Thanyathon Sukcharoen; Thailand	182 kg	Chayuttra Pramongkhol; Thailand	180 kg	Manuela Berrío; Colombia	170 kg
49 kg
Snatch	Jiang Huihua; China	93 kg	Mihaela Cambei; Romania	90 kg	Hou Zhihui; China	89 kg
Clean & Jerk	Jiang Huihua; China	113 kg	Mirabai Chanu; India	113 kg	Hayley Reichardt; United States	110 kg
Total	Jiang Huihua; China	206 kg	Mirabai Chanu; India	200 kg	Hou Zhihui; China	198 kg
55 kg
Snatch	Hidilyn Diaz; Philippines	93 kg	Ana Gabriela López; Mexico	90 kg	Rosalba Morales; Colombia	89 kg
Clean & Jerk	Hidilyn Diaz; Philippines	114 kg	Rosalba Morales; Colombia	110 kg	Shoely Mego; Peru	109 kg
Total	Hidilyn Diaz; Philippines	207 kg	Rosalba Morales; Colombia	199 kg	Ana Gabriela López; Mexico	198 kg
59 kg
Snatch	Luo Xiaomin; China	103 kg	Maude Charron; Canada	103 kg	Kamila Konotop; Ukraine	102 kg
Clean & Jerk	Yenny Álvarez; Colombia	133 kg	Kuo Hsing-chun; Chinese Taipei	130 kg	Luo Shifang; China	129 kg
Total	Yenny Álvarez; Colombia	234 kg	Kuo Hsing-chun; Chinese Taipei	232 kg	Maude Charron; Canada	231 kg
64 kg
Snatch	Pei Xinyi; China	105 kg	Natalia Llamosa; Colombia	101 kg	Rattanawan Wamalun; Thailand	101 kg
Clean & Jerk	Pei Xinyi; China	128 kg	Rattanawan Wamalun; Thailand	126 kg	Natalia Llamosa; Colombia	123 kg
Total	Pei Xinyi; China	233 kg	Rattanawan Wamalun; Thailand	227 kg	Natalia Llamosa; Colombia	224 kg
71 kg
Snatch	Loredana Toma; Romania	119 kg WR	Angie Palacios; Ecuador	116 kg	Zeng Tiantian; China	113 kg
Clean & Jerk	Liao Guifang; China	140 kg	Zeng Tiantian; China	140 kg	Olivia Reeves; United States	139 kg
Total	Loredana Toma; Romania	256 kg	Zeng Tiantian; China	253 kg	Angie Palacios; Ecuador	252 kg
76 kg
Snatch	Sara Ahmed; Egypt	113 kg	Mattie Rogers; United States	109 kg	Bella Paredes; Ecuador	108 kg
Clean & Jerk	Sara Ahmed; Egypt	148 kg	Mattie Rogers; United States	138 kg	Kim Su-hyeon; South Korea	137 kg
Total	Sara Ahmed; Egypt	261 kg	Mattie Rogers; United States	247 kg	Kim Su-hyeon; South Korea	245 kg
81 kg
Snatch	Iryna Dekha; Ukraine	122 kg	Alina Marushchak; Ukraine	119 kg	Liang Xiaomei; China	118 kg
Clean & Jerk	Liang Xiaomei; China	152 kg	Wang Zhouyu; China	151 kg	Tamara Salazar; Ecuador	148 kg
Total	Liang Xiaomei; China	270 kg	Wang Zhouyu; China	266 kg	Tamara Salazar; Ecuador	262 kg
87 kg
Snatch	Solfrid Koanda; Norway	113 kg	Tursunoy Jabborova; Uzbekistan	112 kg	Eileen Cikamatana; Australia	109 kg
Clean & Jerk	Solfrid Koanda; Norway	147 kg	Mönkhjantsangiin Ankhtsetseg; Mongolia	143 kg	Eileen Cikamatana; Australia	140 kg
Total	Solfrid Koanda; Norway	260 kg	Eileen Cikamatana; Australia	249 kg	Tursunoy Jabborova; Uzbekistan	241 kg
+87 kg
Snatch	Li Wenwen; China	141 kg	Sarah Robles; United States	127 kg	Duangaksorn Chaidee; Thailand	126 kg
Clean & Jerk	Li Wenwen; China	170 kg	Emily Campbell; Great Britain	165 kg	Duangaksorn Chaidee; Thailand	160 kg
Total	Li Wenwen; China	311 kg	Emily Campbell; Great Britain	287 kg	Duangaksorn Chaidee; Thailand	286 kg

== Medal table ==
Ranking by Big (Total result) medals

* Host nation (Colombia)

Rank	Nation	Gold	Silver	Bronze	Total
1	China	6	3	3	12
2	Colombia*	2	2	4	8
3	Thailand	2	2	2	6
4	Indonesia	1	2	0	3
5	Bahrain	1	1	0	2
5	Georgia	1	1	0	2
7	Uzbekistan	1	0	1	2
8	Egypt	1	0	0	1
8	Norway	1	0	0	1
8	Philippines	1	0	0	1
8	Qatar	1	0	0	1
8	Romania	1	0	0	1
8	Venezuela	1	0	0	1
14	Kazakhstan	0	1	1	2
15	Australia	0	1	0	1
15	Chinese Taipei	0	1	0	1
15	Great Britain	0	1	0	1
15	India	0	1	0	1
15	Iran	0	1	0	1
15	Turkmenistan	0	1	0	1
15	United States	0	1	0	1
15	Vietnam	0	1	0	1
23	South Korea	0	0	3	3
24	Armenia	0	0	2	2
24	Ecuador	0	0	2	2
26	Canada	0	0	1	1
26	Mexico	0	0	1	1
Totals (27 entries)		20	20	20	60

Ranking by all medals: Big (Total result) and Small (Snatch and Clean & Jerk)

* Host nation (Colombia)

Rank	Nation	Gold	Silver	Bronze	Total
1	China	19	8	7	34
2	Thailand	5	6	7	18
3	Colombia*	3	5	16	24
4	Indonesia	3	4	1	8
5	Georgia	3	2	0	5
6	Uzbekistan	3	1	1	5
7	Egypt	3	0	0	3
7	Norway	3	0	0	3
7	Philippines	3	0	0	3
10	Bahrain	2	3	1	6
11	Romania	2	1	0	3
12	Venezuela	2	0	0	2
13	Kazakhstan	1	3	3	7
14	Iran	1	3	0	4
15	Turkmenistan	1	2	0	3
16	Ukraine	1	1	1	3
16	Vietnam	1	1	1	3
18	Bulgaria	1	1	0	2
18	Qatar	1	1	0	2
20	France	1	0	0	1
20	Turkey	1	0	0	1
22	United States	0	4	2	6
23	Chinese Taipei	0	2	0	2
23	Great Britain	0	2	0	2
23	India	0	2	0	2
26	South Korea	0	1	5	6
27	Ecuador	0	1	4	5
28	Armenia	0	1	3	4
29	Australia	0	1	2	3
30	Canada	0	1	1	2
30	Mexico	0	1	1	2
32	Mongolia	0	1	0	1
32	Spain	0	1	0	1
34	Kyrgyzstan	0	0	1	1
34	Peru	0	0	1	1
34	Syria	0	0	1	1
34	Tunisia	0	0	1	1
Totals (37 entries)		60	60	60	180

== Team ranking ==
=== Men ===
Rank	Team	Points
1	Colombia	620
2	Georgia	528
3	China	507
4	Kazakhstan	479
5	Thailand	412
6	South Korea	391

=== Women ===
Rank	Team	Points
1	China	750
2	United States	609
3	Colombia	608
4	Ecuador	481
5	Mexico	432
6	Thailand	345

== Participating nations ==
A total of 537 competitors from 93 nations participated.

- Albania (1)
- Algeria (4)
- Argentina (2)
- Armenia (12)
- Australia (6)
- Austria (2)
- Bahrain (2)
- Barbados (2)
- Belgium (2)
- Bolivia (1)
- Botswana (2)
- Brazil (7)
- Bulgaria (9)
- Cameroon (3)
- Canada (17)
- China (20)
- Chinese Taipei (13)
- Colombia (20)
- Costa Rica (2)
- Croatia (4)
- Cuba (4)
- Czech Republic (5)
- Denmark (6)
- Dominican Republic (7)
- Ecuador (16)
- Egypt (6)
- El Salvador (1)
- Estonia (1)
- Fiji (1)
- Finland (5)
- France (4)
- Georgia (10)
- Germany (6)
- Ghana (1)
- Great Britain (10)
- Greece (3)
- Guam (1)
- Guyana (2)
- Honduras (4)
- Iceland (2)
- India (5)
- Indonesia (12)
- Iran (11)
- Ireland (3)
- Israel (6)
- Italy (7)
- Japan (18)
- Kazakhstan (13)
- Kenya (3)
- Kyrgyzstan (2)
- Latvia (5)
- Lebanon (2)
- Libya (2)
- Lithuania (6)
- Luxembourg (1)
- Madagascar (3)
- Malta (1)
- Mexico (20)
- Moldova (2)
- Mongolia (5)
- Morocco (1)
- Nauru (3)
- Netherlands (3)
- New Zealand (1)
- Norway (4)
- Oman (2)
- Papua New Guinea (2)
- Paraguay (3)
- Peru (5)
- Philippines (9)
- Poland (3)
- Puerto Rico (7)
- Qatar (1)
- Romania (6)
- Saint Vincent and the Grenadines (1)
- Saudi Arabia (5)
- South Korea (18)
- Spain (12)
- Sweden (4)
- Switzerland (1)
- Syria (1)
- Thailand (13)
- Tonga (2)
- Tunisia (1)
- Turkey (8)
- Ukraine (5)
- United States (20)
- Uzbekistan (10)
- Venezuela (13)
- Vietnam (7)
