= Sathish Sivalingam =

Indian weightlifter

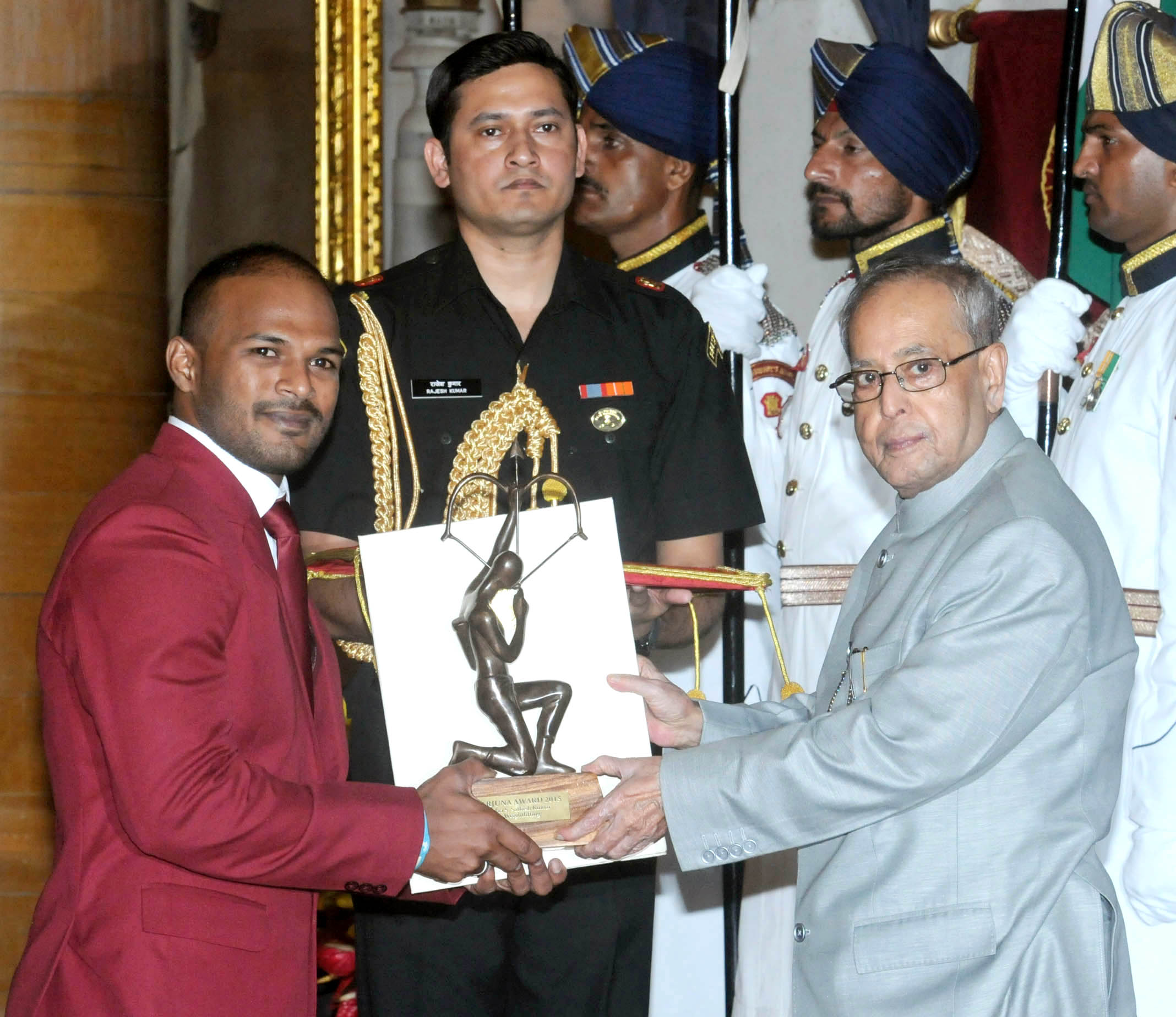
- The President, Shri Pranab Mukherjee presenting the Arjuna Award for the year-2015 to Shri S. Sathish Kumar for Weightlifting, in a glittering ceremony, at Rashtrapati Bhavan, in New Delhi on August 29, 2015.

Personal information
- Nationality: Indian
- Born: Satish Kumar Sivalingam; 23 June 1992 (age 34) Vellore, Tamil Nadu, India
- Height: 1.75 m (5 ft 9 in) (2014)
- Weight: 77 kg (170 lb) (2018)

Sport
- Country: India
- Sport: Weightlifting
- Event: 77 kg
Medal record
Men's weightlifting
Representing India
Commonwealth Games
Gold medal – first place	2014 Glasgow	77 kg
Gold medal – first place	2018 Gold Coast	77 kg
Commonwealth Championships
Gold medal – first place	2012 Apia	77 kg
Gold medal – first place	2013 Penang	77 kg
Gold medal – first place	2015 Pune	77 kg
Gold medal – first place	2017 Gold Coast	77 kg
- Updated on 27 January 2022

Sathish Sivalingam (born 23 June 1992) is an Indian weightlifter who won gold medals in the men's 77 kg weight class at both the 2014 and the 2018 Commonwealth Games. He is supported by the GoSports Foundation through the Rahul Dravid athlete mentorship programme.

== Early life ==
Sathish was born in Sathuvachari, Vellore, Tamil Nadu, India to Sivalingam and Deivanai. His father Sivalingam an ex-serviceman who won gold medals at national level and now works as a security guard at VIT University, Vellore. Sathish did his schooling in Government Higher Secondary School, Sathuvachari. He works as a clerk in Southern Railways Chennai.

== Career ==
At the 2018 Commonwealth Games he won gold medal in 77 kg category. He lifted 144 kg in snatch games record and 173 kg in clean and jerk.

At the 2014 Commonwealth Games, Sivalingam won the gold medal in the men's 77 kg, with 149 kg snatch, and 179 kg clean and jerk lifts, totalling 328 kg. His lift of 149 kg in the snatch, set a new games record.

Sathish qualified for the 2016 Rio Olympics in the Men's 77 kg category, where he finished 11th in the field of 14 lifters.

== Achievements ==
Commonwealth Games

Year	Venue	Event	Total	Result
2014	Glasgow	77 kg	328	Gold
2018	Gold Coast	77 kg	317	Gold

Commonwealth Championships

Year	Venue	Event	Total	Result
2012	Apia	77 kg	297	Gold
2013	Penang	77 kg	317	Gold
2015	Pune	77 kg	325	Gold
2017	Gold Coast	77 kg	320	Gold

== See also ==
- List of people from Vellore
