= Nijat Rahimov =

Azerbaijani-born naturalised Kazakhstani weightlifter

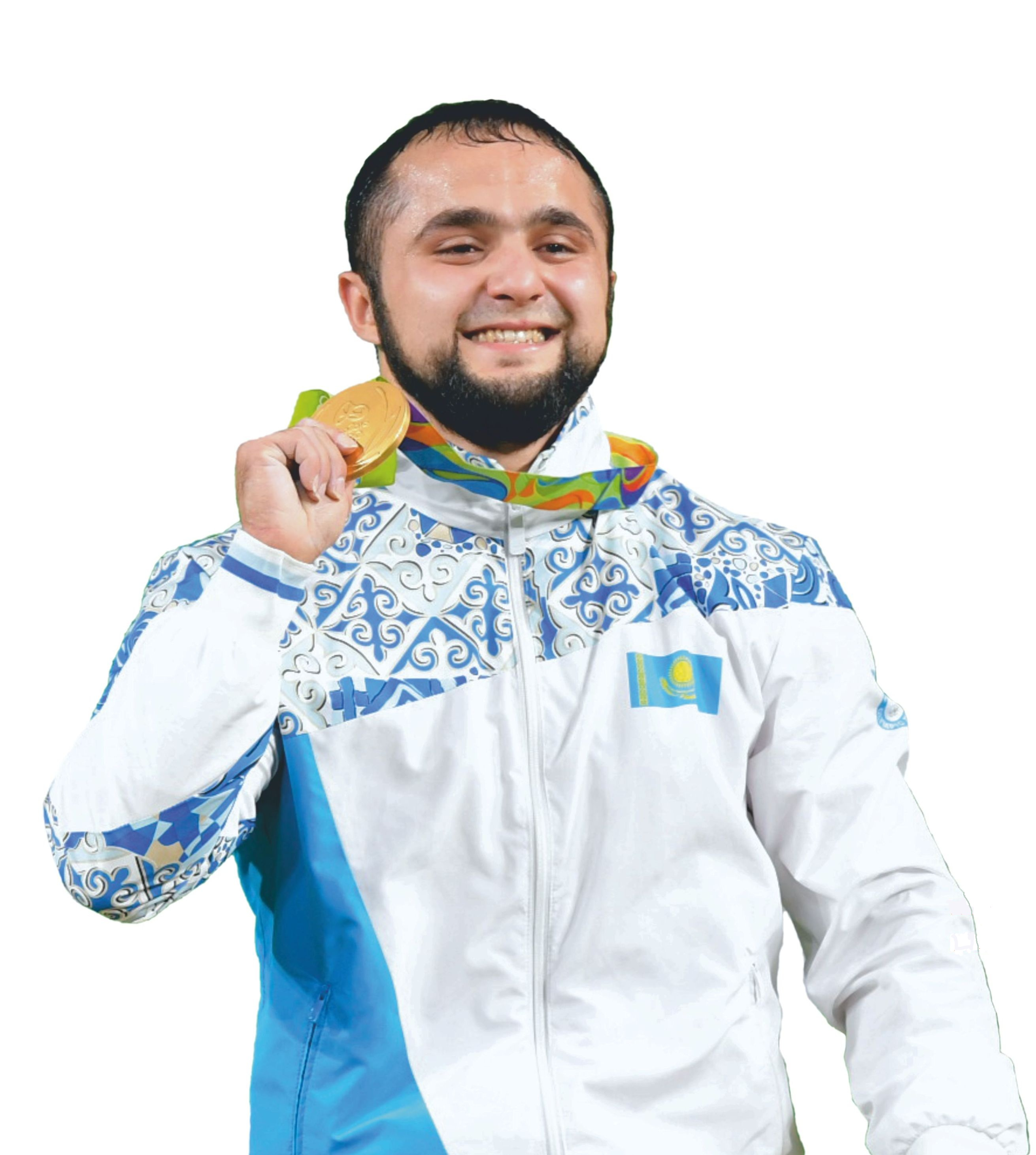

Personal information
- Native name: Nicat Rəhimov / Нижат Раxимов
- Nationality: Azerbaijani
- Born: 13 August 1993 (age 33) Baku, Azerbaijan
- Height: 1.65 m (5 ft 5 in)
- Weight: 76 kg (168 lb)

Sport
- Country: Kazakhstan
- Sport: Olympic weightlifting
- Event: -77 kg

Achievements and titles
- Personal bests: Snatch: 165 kg (2016); Clean and jerk: 214 kg (2016, WR); Total: 379 kg (2016)
Medal record
Representing Kazakhstan
Olympic Games
Disqualified	2016 Rio de Janeiro	–77 kg
World Championships
Gold medal – first place	2015 Houston	–77 kg
Representing Azerbaijan
Youth Olympic Games
Gold medal – first place	2010 Singapore	–69 kg
Junior World Championships
Silver medal – second place	2013 Lima	–77 kg

Nijat Rahimov (Azerbaijani: Nicat Rəhimov; born 13 August 1993) is an Azerbaijani-born naturalized Kazakhstani weightlifter. He represented Kazakhstan at the 2016 Summer Olympics, in the category of 77 kg, he placed first, winning the gold medal and setting a new world record with a clean and jerk lift of 214 kilograms. In 2022, the medal was stripped and he was banned when it was revealed he substituted urine samples.

== Career ==
Rahimov won a gold medal for Azerbaijan at the 2010 Summer Youth Olympics and a silver at the 2013 Junior World Weightlifting Championships.

At the 2013 Summer Universiade he served as a flag bearer for Azerbaijan. Rahimov was suspended for 2 years from June 2013 after testing positive for anabolic steroids. An out of competition doping test found prior use of oxandrolone and dehydromethyltestosterone.

Rahimov won a gold medal for Kazakhstan at the 2016 Olympics in the 77 kg weight class, setting a world record in clean and jerk (214 kg).

In 2022, he was stripped of his gold medal from the 2016 Olympics over doping. The Egyptian weightlifter, who finished third in the 2016 Olympics, has made statements against him.

== See also ==
- List of Olympic medalists in weightlifting
- List of Youth Olympic Games gold medalists who won Olympic gold medals
