= Andrés Mata (weightlifter) =

Spanish weightlifter (born 1992)

Personal information
- Full name: Andrés Eduardo Mata Pére
- Born: 11 November 1992 (age 33) Valencia, Carabobo, Venezuela
- Height: 1.74 m (5 ft 9 in)
- Weight: 80.70 kg (178 lb)

Sport
- Country: Spain
- Sport: Weightlifting
- Event: –81 kg
Medal record
European Championships
Silver medal – second place	2022 Tirana	–81 kg
Bronze medal – third place	2018 Bucharest	–77 kg

Andrés Eduardo Mata Pérez (Note: In this Spanish name, the first or paternal surname is Mata and the second or maternal family name is Pérez.) (born 11 November 1992 in Valencia, Carabobo, Venezuela) is a Venezuelan-born Spanish weightlifter competing in the 81 kg category. He competed at the 2012, 2016 Summer Olympics and 2020 Summer Olympics.
