= 2015 World Weightlifting Championships – Men's 85 kg =

The men's 85 kilograms event at the 2015 World Weightlifting Championships was held on 24 and 25 November 2015 in Houston, United States.

== Schedule ==
Date	Time	Event
24 November 2015	09:00	Group D
24 November 2015	11:30	Group C
24 November 2015	19:25	Group B
25 November 2015	14:55	Group A

== Medalists ==
Event	Gold		Silver		Bronze	
Snatch	Tian Tao (CHN)	178 kg	Artem Okulov (RUS)	176 kg	Kianoush Rostami (IRI)	173 kg
Clean & Jerk	Artem Okulov (RUS)	215 kg	Kianoush Rostami (IRI)	214 kg	Apti Aukhadov (RUS)	212 kg
Total	Artem Okulov (RUS)	391 kg	Kianoush Rostami (IRI)	387 kg	Apti Aukhadov (RUS)	380 kg

== Records ==
Prior to this competition, the existing world records were as follows.

World record	Snatch	Andrei Rybakou (BLR)	187 kg	Chiang Mai, Thailand	22 September 2007
World record	Clean & Jerk	Zhang Yong (CHN)	218 kg	Ramat Gan, Israel	25 April 1998
World record	Total	~~Andrei Rybakou (BLR)~~; Lu Yong (CHN)	~~394 kg~~ 394 kg	~~Beijing, China~~; Beijing, China	~~15 August 2008~~; 15 August 2008

- Andrei Rybakou's world record was rescinded in 2016.

== Results ==
Rank	Athlete	Group	Body weight	Snatch (kg)				Clean & Jerk (kg)				Total
Rank	Athlete	Group	Body weight	1	2	3	Rank	1	2	3	Rank	Total
1st place, gold medalist(s)	Artem Okulov (RUS)	A	84.63	168	174	176	2nd place, silver medalist(s)	205	211	215	1st place, gold medalist(s)	391
2nd place, silver medalist(s)	Kianoush Rostami (IRI)	A	84.37	173	~~178~~	~~178~~	3rd place, bronze medalist(s)	214	~~218~~	~~219~~	2nd place, silver medalist(s)	387
3rd place, bronze medalist(s)	Apti Aukhadov (RUS)	A	84.84	168	~~172~~	~~173~~	4	205	212	~~216~~	3rd place, bronze medalist(s)	380
4	Oleksandr Pielieshenko (UKR)	A	84.54	167	~~173~~	~~173~~	7	~~201~~	201	~~210~~	7	368
5	Gabriel Sîncrăian (ROU)	A	84.35	163	~~167~~	167	6	196	200	~~203~~	8	367
6	Petr Asayonak (BLR)	A	83.43	167	~~173~~	~~173~~	5	196	~~202~~	~~202~~	11	363
7	Antonino Pizzolato (ITA)	B	84.85	155	159	161	10	194	198	202	5	363
8	Ulugbek Alimov (UZB)	B	84.27	150	155	158	11	192	197	202	4	360
9	Alexandru Dudoglo (MDA)	B	84.84	160	~~163~~	163	8	187	192	197	10	360
10	Benjamin Hennequin (FRA)	A	84.49	~~155~~	155	~~160~~	17	195	~~201~~	201	6	356
11	Yu Dong-ju (KOR)	B	84.39	151	157	~~161~~	14	193	198	~~200~~	9	355
12	Gheorghe Cernei (ROU)	A	84.14	162	~~166~~	~~166~~	9	190	~~196~~	—	13	352
13	Tarek Yehia (EGY)	C	84.68	151	156	158	12	181	188	192	12	350
14	Giovanni Bardis (FRA)	B	84.80	158	~~162~~	~~162~~	13	187	~~193~~	~~193~~	16	345
15	Muhammad Begaliev (UZB)	C	83.91	152	156	~~160~~	16	184	188	~~190~~	14	344
16	Yoelmis Hernández (CUB)	B	83.78	153	~~158~~	~~158~~	19	187	~~190~~	—	15	340
17	Ammar Hassan (EGY)	C	84.58	150	~~155~~	~~155~~	23	180	185	—	17	335
18	Pascal Plamondon (CAN)	C	84.53	150	~~154~~	~~154~~	22	184	~~189~~	~~189~~	19	334
19	Baýmyrat Orazdurdyýew (TKM)	D	83.69	~~140~~	140	146	26	175	181	~~185~~	21	327
20	Manuel Sánchez (ESP)	C	84.25	147	~~152~~	~~152~~	25	~~180~~	~~180~~	180	23	327
21	Welisson Silva (BRA)	C	84.50	145	~~152~~	~~152~~	28	~~182~~	182	~~187~~	20	327
22	Hoàng Tấn Tài (VIE)	D	84.34	135	141	~~146~~	31	172	180	184	18	325
23	Donatas Anuškevičius (LTU)	C	84.51	145	~~152~~	~~152~~	29	~~180~~	180	~~184~~	24	325
24	Imam Jamaludin (INA)	C	83.91	137	~~142~~	142	30	181	~~187~~	~~187~~	22	323
25	Boady Santavy (CAN)	D	84.19	143	148	~~152~~	24	175	~~179~~	~~179~~	25	323
26	Amar Musić (CRO)	D	84.43	140	~~146~~	146	27	175	~~180~~	~~180~~	26	321
27	Dany Termignone (SUI)	D	83.77	129	~~134~~	134	32	158	163	~~167~~	27	297
28	Christian Amoah (GHA)	D	82.96	122	125	~~128~~	33	146	150	154	29	279
29	Kabuati Bob (MHL)	D	83.56	115	~~120~~	120	34	155	~~160~~	~~160~~	28	275
—	Tian Tao (CHN)	A	84.59	173	~~178~~	178	1st place, gold medalist(s)	~~211~~	~~211~~	~~211~~	—	—
—	Daýanç Aşyrow (TKM)	B	84.97	~~155~~	~~155~~	157	15	~~185~~	~~185~~	~~185~~	—	—
—	Renson Balza (VEN)	C	83.19	152	~~155~~	~~155~~	20	~~184~~	~~184~~	~~184~~	—	—
—	Lim Young-chul (KOR)	B	84.84	155	~~160~~	~~162~~	18	~~193~~	~~193~~	~~193~~	—	—
—	Irmantas Kačinskas (LTU)	D	84.01	145	150	~~155~~	21	~~175~~	~~175~~	~~175~~	—	—
—	János Baranyai (HUN)	C	83.94	—	—	—	—	—	—	—	—	—
DQ	Iurie Bulat (MDA)	B	84.58	165	~~172~~	~~176~~	—	175	185	~~190~~	—	350
DQ	Yermek Omirtay (KAZ)	A	84.26	~~160~~	160	165	—	~~200~~	~~200~~	~~200~~	—	—
