= 2014 World Weightlifting Championships – Men's 85 kg =

The men's 85 kilograms event at the 2014 World Weightlifting Championships was held on 12–13 November 2014 in Baluan Sholak Sports Palace, Almaty, Kazakhstan.

== Schedule ==
Date	Time	Event
12 November 2014	14:00	Group D
12 November 2014	16:00	Group C
12 November 2014	21:00	Group B
13 November 2014	19:00	Group A

== Medalists ==
Event	Gold		Silver		Bronze	
Snatch	Ivan Markov (BUL)	179 kg	Kianoush Rostami (IRI)	178 kg	Andrei Rybakou (BLR)	175 kg
Clean & Jerk	Kianoush Rostami (IRI)	213 kg	Ulugbek Alimov (UZB)	213 kg	Artem Okulov (RUS)	211 kg
Total	Kianoush Rostami (IRI)	391 kg	Ivan Markov (BUL)	390 kg	Artem Okulov (RUS)	385 kg

== Records ==
Prior to this competition, the existing world records were as follows.

World Record	Snatch	Andrei Rybakou (BLR)	187 kg	Chiang Mai, Thailand	22 September 2007
World Record	Clean & Jerk	Zhang Yong (CHN)	218 kg	Ramat Gan, Israel	25 April 1998
World Record	Total	~~Andrei Rybakou (BLR)~~; Lu Yong (CHN)	~~394 kg~~ 394 kg	~~Beijing, China~~; Beijing, China	~~15 August 2008~~; 15 August 2008

- Andrei Rybakou's world record was rescinded in 2016.

== Results ==
Rank	Athlete	Group	Body weight	Snatch (kg)				Clean & Jerk (kg)				Total
Rank	Athlete	Group	Body weight	1	2	3	Rank	1	2	3	Rank	Total
1st place, gold medalist(s)	Kianoush Rostami (IRI)	A	84.25	173	176	178	2nd place, silver medalist(s)	~~211~~	~~212~~	213	1st place, gold medalist(s)	391
2nd place, silver medalist(s)	Ivan Markov (BUL)	A	84.45	174	177	179	1st place, gold medalist(s)	207	211	~~214~~	4	390
3rd place, bronze medalist(s)	Artem Okulov (RUS)	A	84.25	170	174	~~177~~	4	205	211	~~218~~	3rd place, bronze medalist(s)	385
4	Ulugbek Alimov (UZB)	A	84.34	163	168	~~170~~	8	200	207	213	2nd place, silver medalist(s)	381
5	Apti Aukhadov (RUS)	A	84.55	169	173	~~175~~	5	205	~~213~~	~~213~~	6	378
6	Tian Tao (CHN)	A	84.28	165	170	~~175~~	6	205	~~211~~	~~219~~	5	375
7	Pavel Khadasevich (BLR)	A	84.15	161	166	169	7	~~196~~	196	200	9	369
8	Andrei Rybakou (BLR)	A	84.57	~~175~~	175	~~179~~	3rd place, bronze medalist(s)	182	~~191~~	191	19	366
9	Sa Jae-hyouk (KOR)	A	82.36	155	165	—	9	200	~~210~~	~~212~~	7	365
10	Benjamin Hennequin (FRA)	A	84.52	152	157	160	12	~~200~~	200	~~211~~	10	360
11	Antonis Martasidis (GRE)	B	84.01	155	~~160~~	~~160~~	20	195	200	—	8	355
12	Alexandru Dudoglo (MDA)	B	84.63	160	~~163~~	~~163~~	13	190	195	—	15	355
13	Muhammad Begaliev (UZB)	B	83.20	155	160	162	10	183	188	191	18	353
14	Aghasi Aghasyan (ARM)	B	84.69	152	156	~~158~~	18	192	197	—	11	353
15	Tom Schwarzbach (GER)	B	84.40	152	156	~~159~~	16	191	195	~~199~~	14	351
16	Giovanni Bardis (FRA)	B	84.77	~~156~~	156	160	14	185	191	~~194~~	20	351
17	Theodoros Iakovidis (GRE)	B	83.66	155	~~160~~	~~160~~	19	185	192	~~195~~	17	347
18	Anatoliy Mushyk (ISR)	B	84.69	155	159	161	11	186	~~190~~	~~191~~	27	347
19	Ferney Manzano (COL)	B	84.17	~~152~~	152	~~156~~	24	188	194	~~197~~	16	346
20	Karol Samko (SVK)	B	84.73	145	149	~~152~~	32	190	196	~~199~~	13	345
21	Krzysztof Szramiak (POL)	C	84.42	150	154	156	17	182	188	~~192~~	25	344
22	Rasoul Taghian (IRI)	B	82.35	149	153	~~156~~	22	182	190	—	21	343
23	Krenar Shoraj (ALB)	C	82.79	~~140~~	140	146	34	190	196	~~200~~	12	342
24	Antonino Pizzolato (ITA)	C	84.68	145	150	152	25	190	~~195~~	~~195~~	22	342
25	Inoýat Jumaýew (TKM)	B	84.98	150	~~154~~	~~156~~	31	185	190	~~193~~	23	340
26	Ali El-Kekli (LBA)	C	84.25	145	150	~~153~~	29	182	188	~~192~~	24	338
27	Semih Yağcı (TUR)	B	84.72	147	~~151~~	151	26	187	~~192~~	~~193~~	26	338
28	Renson Balza (VEN)	D	82.79	140	145	150	27	~~180~~	180	185	28	335
29	Marius Mickevičius (LTU)	C	84.40	146	151	154	21	178	~~182~~	~~185~~	34	332
30	Richard Tkáč (SVK)	C	84.25	~~150~~	150	~~155~~	30	180	~~186~~	~~186~~	32	330
31	Aidar Mamadraimov (KGZ)	C	84.35	152	157	~~160~~	15	170	~~178~~	~~178~~	41	327
32	Manuel Sánchez (ESP)	D	84.20	140	145	~~150~~	36	175	~~180~~	180	31	325
33	Khalil Al-Hamqan (KSA)	D	83.84	~~140~~	144	~~147~~	39	174	179	~~181~~	33	323
34	János Baranyai (HUN)	D	83.37	140	145	147	33	175	~~180~~	~~180~~	37	322
35	Vikas Thakur (IND)	D	84.48	~~140~~	140	145	38	170	~~177~~	177	36	322
36	Hoàng Tấn Tài (VIE)	D	84.10	140	~~148~~	~~148~~	40	180	~~188~~	~~188~~	30	320
37	Pascal Plamondon (CAN)	D	84.32	145	~~150~~	~~150~~	37	170	175	—	38	320
38	Romário Martins (BRA)	D	84.63	140	~~145~~	~~145~~	41	172	~~178~~	178	35	318
39	Junior Santana (ESP)	D	82.15	140	145	~~150~~	35	~~170~~	170	~~175~~	40	315
40	Milko Tokola (FIN)	D	82.75	130	135	137	42	~~160~~	163	168	42	305
41	Ensar Musić (CRO)	D	83.60	115	121	126	43	165	171	~~176~~	39	297
42	Cathal Byrd (IRL)	D	82.37	~~120~~	120	~~125~~	44	155	160	~~164~~	43	280
—	Volodymyr Bolharyn (UKR)	C	80.58	152	~~156~~	~~156~~	23	~~178~~	~~178~~	~~178~~	—	—
—	Abdallah Mekki (ALG)	C	84.07	145	150	~~153~~	28	~~177~~	~~178~~	~~180~~	—	—
—	Imam Jamaludin (INA)	C	84.27	~~140~~	~~140~~	~~140~~	—	183	~~191~~	~~191~~	29	—
DQ	Hysen Pulaku (ALB)	B	82.83	150	160	165	—	200	~~210~~	~~210~~	—	—
