= 2013 World Weightlifting Championships – Men's 85 kg =

The men's competition in the –85 kg division was held on 24–25 October 2013 in Centennial Hall, Wrocław, Poland.

== Schedule ==
Date	Time	Event
24 October 2013	14:00	Group C
25 October 2013	10:00	Group B
25 October 2013	16:55	Group A

== Medalists ==
Event	Gold		Silver		Bronze	
Snatch	Andrei Rybakou (BLR)	179 kg	Ivan Markov (BUL)	175 kg	Apti Aukhadov (RUS)	175 kg
Clean & Jerk	Apti Aukhadov (RUS)	212 kg	Artem Okulov (RUS)	209 kg	Yoelmis Hernández (CUB)	208 kg
Total	Apti Aukhadov (RUS)	387 kg	Ivan Markov (BUL)	381 kg	Artem Okulov (RUS)	381 kg

== Records ==
Prior to this competition, the existing world records were as follows.

World Record	Snatch	Andrei Rybakou (BLR)	187 kg	Chiang Mai, Thailand	22 September 2007
World Record	Clean & Jerk	Zhang Yong (CHN)	218 kg	Ramat Gan, Israel	25 April 1998
World Record	Total	~~Andrei Rybakou (BLR)~~; Lu Yong (CHN)	~~394 kg~~ 394 kg	~~Beijing, China~~; Beijing, China	~~15 August 2008~~; 15 August 2008

- Andrei Rybakou's world record was rescinded in 2016.

== Results ==
Rank	Athlete	Group	Body weight	Snatch (kg)				Clean & Jerk (kg)				Total
Rank	Athlete	Group	Body weight	1	2	3	Rank	1	2	3	Rank	Total
1st place, gold medalist(s)	Apti Aukhadov (RUS)	A	84.20	170	175	~~178~~	3rd place, bronze medalist(s)	205	212	~~219~~	1st place, gold medalist(s)	387
2nd place, silver medalist(s)	Ivan Markov (BUL)	A	84.02	170	~~175~~	175	2nd place, silver medalist(s)	203	206	~~212~~	4	381
3rd place, bronze medalist(s)	Artem Okulov (RUS)	A	84.74	165	170	172	5	200	~~207~~	209	2nd place, silver medalist(s)	381
4	Adrian Zieliński (POL)	A	84.74	171	~~175~~	175	4	~~204~~	~~204~~	205	5	380
5	Yoelmis Hernández (CUB)	A	84.34	158	165	~~167~~	6	204	208	~~212~~	3rd place, bronze medalist(s)	373
6	Andrei Rybakou (BLR)	A	84.45	175	~~179~~	179	1st place, gold medalist(s)	~~194~~	194	~~200~~	7	373
7	Tarek Yehia (EGY)	A	84.68	160	165	—	7	203	~~210~~	~~211~~	6	368
8	Mikalai Novikau (BLR)	A	84.70	~~160~~	160	~~165~~	10	193	~~205~~	~~205~~	8	353
9	Giovanni Bardis (FRA)	A	84.72	~~156~~	156	161	8	~~186~~	186	~~193~~	11	347
10	János Baranyai (HUN)	B	84.38	~~150~~	150	155	11	188	191	~~193~~	9	346
11	Michael Müller (GER)	B	84.68	146	150	~~153~~	13	183	187	190	10	340
12	Freddy Tenorio (ECU)	B	83.54	145	~~150~~	150	12	185	~~188~~	~~188~~	13	335
13	Travis Cooper (USA)	B	84.42	145	~~148~~	~~148~~	18	~~183~~	~~183~~	185	14	330
14	Hoàng Tấn Tài (VIE)	C	84.55	135	145	~~150~~	20	175	185	~~188~~	15	330
15	Marius Mickevičius (LTU)	B	84.67	146	~~149~~	~~150~~	15	177	182	~~185~~	17	328
16	Andrés Mata (ESP)	B	78.98	142	~~147~~	~~147~~	21	181	~~185~~	185	12	327
17	Michael Nackoul (USA)	B	84.32	~~139~~	139	145	17	177	182	~~185~~	16	327
18	Mathieu Marineau (CAN)	C	84.54	140	~~145~~	145	19	~~175~~	175	180	18	325
19	Karen Tovmasjan (NED)	C	84.20	143	~~147~~	147	14	175	~~181~~	~~181~~	20	322
20	Pascal Plamondon (CAN)	C	84.22	~~140~~	140	145	16	176	~~180~~	~~180~~	19	321
21	Jack Oliver (GBR)	C	83.86	135	140	~~143~~	22	~~173~~	173	~~181~~	21	313
22	Igor Majlinger (CRO)	C	83.82	~~113~~	113	118	23	133	138	142	22	260
—	Tian Tao (CHN)	A	83.57	160	~~165~~	~~165~~	9	—	—	—	—	—
