= Weightlifting at the 2016 Summer Olympics – Men's 85 kg =

Men's 85 kg at the Games of the XXXI Olympiad
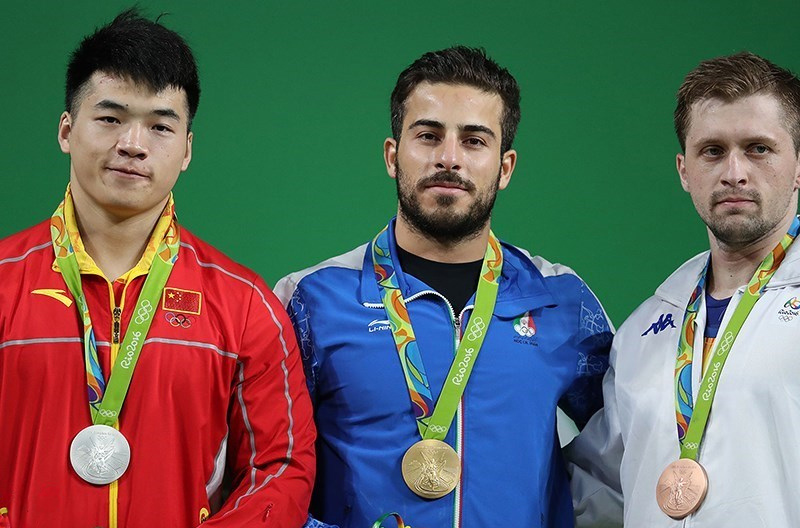
- L-R: Tian, Rostami, Sîncrăian
- Venue: Riocentro
- Date: 12 August 2016
- Competitors: 24 from 22 nations
- Winning total: 396 kg WR

Medalists
| 1st place, gold medalist(s) | | Kianoush Rostami | Iran |
| 2nd place, silver medalist(s) | | Tian Tao | China |
| 3rd place, bronze medalist(s) | | Denis Ulanov | Kazakhstan |

The Men's 85 kg weightlifting competitions at the 2016 Summer Olympics in Rio de Janeiro took place on 12 August at the Pavilion 2 of Riocentro.

On October 13, 2016, the IWF reported that bronze medalist Gabriel Sincraian of Romania had tested positive for excess testosterone in a test connected to the Rio Olympics.

== Schedule ==
All times are Time in Brazil (UTC-03:00)

| Date | Time | Event |
|---|---|---|
| 12 August 2016 | 10:00 | Group B |
| 12 August 2016 | 19:00 | Group A |

== Records ==
Prior to this competition, the existing world and Olympic records were as follows.

| World record | Snatch | Andrei Rybakou (BLR) | 187 kg | Chiang Mai, Thailand | 22 September 2007 |
| World record | Clean & Jerk | Kianoush Rostami (IRN) | 220 kg | Tehran, Iran | 31 May 2016 |
| World record | Total | Kianoush Rostami (IRN) | 395 kg | Tehran, Iran | 31 May 2016 |
| Olympic record | Snatch | Giorgi Asanidze (GEO) | 180 kg | Sydney, Australia | 23 September 2000 |
| Olympic record | Clean & Jerk | Pyrros Dimas (GRE) | 215 kg | Sydney, Australia | 23 September 2000 |
| Olympic record | Total | Yong Lu (CHN) | 394 kg | Beijing, China | 15 August 2008 |

== Results ==
| Rank | Athlete | Group | Body weight | Snatch (kg) | | | | Clean & Jerk (kg) | | | | Total |
| Rank | Athlete | Group | Body weight | 1 | 2 | 3 | Result | 1 | 2 | 3 | Result | Total |
|---|---|---|---|---|---|---|---|---|---|---|---|---|
| 1st place, gold medalist(s) | Kianoush Rostami (IRI) | A | 84.26 | 174 | 179 | ~~182~~ | 179 | ~~215~~ | 215 | 217 | 217 OR | 396 WR OR |
| 2nd place, silver medalist(s) | Tian Tao (CHN) | A | 84.85 | ~~173~~ | ~~178~~ | 178 | 178 | ~~210~~ | ~~210~~ | 217 | 217 OR | 395 |
| 3rd place, bronze medalist(s) | Denis Ulanov (KAZ) | A | 84.95 | 170 | ~~175~~ | 175 | 175 | ~~215~~ | ~~215~~ | 215 | 215 | 390 |
| 4 | Oleksandr Pielieshenko (UKR) | A | 84.73 | 170 | 173 | 175 | 175 | ~~210~~ | 210 | ~~212~~ | 210 | 385 |
| 5 | Petr Asayonak (BLR) | A | 84.24 | 165 | 170 | ~~173~~ | 170 | 201 | 207 | ~~215~~ | 207 | 377 |
| 6 | Pavel Khadasevich (BLR) | A | 84.47 | 166 | 170 | ~~173~~ | 170 | 195 | ~~201~~ | ~~201~~ | 195 | 365 |
| 7 | Fares El-Bakh (QAT) | A | 84.79 | 151 | 155 | 158 | 158 | 197 | 203 | ~~208~~ | 203 | 361 |
| 8 | Giovanni Bardis (FRA) | B | 84.63 | ~~160~~ | 160 | 165 | 165 | 185 | ~~190~~ | 192 | 192 | 357 |
| 9 | Benjamin Hennequin (FRA) | A | 84.43 | 155 | ~~160~~ | ~~160~~ | 155 | 195 | ~~202~~ | ~~202~~ | 195 | 350 |
| 10 | Yoelmis Hernández (CUB) | A | 84.49 | ~~150~~ | ~~150~~ | 150 | 150 | 200 | ~~205~~ | ~~205~~ | 200 | 350 |
| 11 | Theodoros Iakovidis (GRE) | B | 84.58 | 151 | 156 | 160 | 160 | 186 | 190 | ~~197~~ | 190 | 350 |
| 12 | Pascal Plamondon (CAN) | B | 85.00 | 150 | ~~155~~ | 155 | 155 | ~~185~~ | 185 | 190 | 190 | 345 |
| 13 | Yu Dong-ju (KOR) | B | 84.44 | 150 | ~~157~~ | ~~157~~ | 150 | 190 | ~~195~~ | ~~195~~ | 190 | 340 |
| 14 | Amar Musić (CRO) | B | 84.58 | 140 | 145 | 150 | 150 | ~~180~~ | 180 | 186 | 186 | 336 |
| 15 | Richie Patterson (NZL) | B | 84.13 | 145 | ~~149~~ | 149 | 149 | 181 | ~~186~~ | ~~187~~ | 181 | 330 |
| 16 | Hoàng Tấn Tài (VIE) | B | 84.27 | 135 | 140 | 145 | 145 | 172 | 180 | ~~185~~ | 180 | 325 |
| 17 | Welisson Silva (BRA) | B | 84.69 | 140 | 145 | ~~150~~ | 145 | 180 | ~~190~~ | ~~190~~ | 180 | 325 |
| 18 | Milko Tokola (FIN) | B | 84.79 | 140 | 145 | ~~148~~ | 145 | 170 | ~~175~~ | 175 | 175 | 320 |
| 19 | Khalid El-Aabidi (MAR) | B | 80.57 | 120 | ~~127~~ | ~~130~~ | 120 | 153 | 160 | 165 | 165 | 285 |
| 20 | Christian Amoah (GHA) | B | 83.52 | 121 | 125 | 130 | 130 | ~~153~~ | 153 | ~~157~~ | 153 | 283 |
| – | Kyle Micallef (MLT) | B | 84.87 | ~~118~~ | ~~118~~ | ~~118~~ | DNF | —N/a | —N/a | —N/a | —N/a | DNF |
| – | Arakel Mirzoyan (ARM) | A | 83.67 | ~~158~~ | 158 | ~~160~~ | 158 | —N/a | —N/a | —N/a | —N/a | DNF |
| DSQ | Gabriel Sîncrăian (ROU) | A | 84.33 | 167 | 171 | 173 | 173 | 204 | 212 | 217 | 217 OR | 390 |

Antonis Martasidis (CYP) was originally on the entry list but was ejected from the Games after testing positive for a banned substance on July 25.

== New records ==
| Clean & Jerk | 217 kg | Tian Tao (CHN) | OR |
| Total | 395 kg | Tian Tao (CHN) | OR, =WR |
| Clean & Jerk | ~~217 kg~~ | ~~Gabriel Sîncrăian (ROU)~~ | ~~=OR~~ |
| Clean & Jerk | 217 kg | Kianoush Rostami (IRI) | =OR |
| Total | 396 kg | Kianoush Rostami (IRI) | OR, WR |
