= 2011 World Weightlifting Championships – Men's 85 kg =

The men's competition in the light-heavyweight (– 85 kg) division was held on 10–11 November 2011.

== Schedule ==
Date	Time	Event
10 November 2011	21:30	Group C
11 November 2011	14:00	Group B
11 November 2011	19:00	Group A

== Medalists ==
Event	Gold		Silver		Bronze	
Snatch	Andrei Rybakou (BLR)	178 kg	Adrian Zieliński (POL)	174 kg	Kianoush Rostami (IRI)	173 kg
Clean & Jerk	Kianoush Rostami (IRI)	209 kg	Benjamin Hennequin (FRA)	208 kg	Yoelmis Hernández (CUB)	205 kg
Total	Kianoush Rostami (IRI)	382 kg	Benjamin Hennequin (FRA)	378 kg	Adrian Zieliński (POL)	376 kg

== Records ==
Prior to this competition, the existing world records were as follows.

World Record	Snatch	Andrei Rybakou (BLR)	187 kg	Chiang Mai, Thailand	22 September 2007
World Record	Clean & Jerk	Zhang Yong (CHN)	218 kg	Ramat Gan, Israel	25 April 1998
World Record	Total	~~Andrei Rybakou (BLR)~~; Lu Yong (CHN)	~~394 kg~~ 394 kg	~~Beijing, China~~; Beijing, China	~~15 August 2008~~; 15 August 2008

- Andrei Rybakou's world record was rescinded in 2016.

== Results ==
Rank	Athlete	Group	Body weight	Snatch (kg)				Clean & Jerk (kg)				Total
Rank	Athlete	Group	Body weight	1	2	3	Rank	1	2	3	Rank	Total
1st place, gold medalist(s)	Kianoush Rostami (IRI)	A	84.53	169	173	~~176~~	3rd place, bronze medalist(s)	209	~~219~~	~~219~~	1st place, gold medalist(s)	382
2nd place, silver medalist(s)	Benjamin Hennequin (FRA)	A	84.69	162	167	170	4	203	208	~~210~~	2nd place, silver medalist(s)	378
3rd place, bronze medalist(s)	Adrian Zieliński (POL)	A	84.62	170	174	~~176~~	2nd place, silver medalist(s)	202	~~208~~	~~208~~	8	376
4	Rinat Kireev (RUS)	A	84.96	165	170	~~173~~	6	204	~~209~~	~~209~~	5	374
5	Apti Aukhadov (RUS)	A	84.36	168	~~173~~	~~173~~	8	202	~~208~~	~~210~~	7	370
6	Gabriel Sîncrăian (ROU)	A	84.72	169	~~175~~	~~176~~	7	201	~~210~~	~~210~~	9	370
7	Andrei Rybakou (BLR)	B	84.46	170	175	178	1st place, gold medalist(s)	182	190	~~195~~	18	368
8	Ragab Abdelhay (EGY)	A	84.62	155	161	~~163~~	14	195	200	203	6	364
9	Yoelmis Hernández (CUB)	A	82.49	155	~~160~~	~~160~~	22	205	~~210~~	~~210~~	3rd place, bronze medalist(s)	360
10	Vladimir Kuznetsov (KAZ)	B	84.38	152	157	160	16	190	195	200	10	360
11	Iurii Chykyda (UKR)	A	84.65	165	~~170~~	~~170~~	9	~~195~~	~~195~~	195	14	360
12	Tom Schwarzbach (GER)	B	84.61	148	152	154	23	195	199	205	4	359
13	Vadzim Straltsou (BLR)	B	84.89	155	160	163	11	190	196	~~200~~	11	359
14	Sherzodjon Yusupov (UZB)	B	83.66	154	158	163	10	195	~~205~~	~~210~~	12	358
15	Ilirjan Suli (ALB)	A	84.97	~~163~~	163	~~167~~	12	~~193~~	~~193~~	193	15	356
16	Rauli Tsirekidze (GEO)	B	84.10	~~153~~	153	157	18	187	191	195	13	352
17	Mansur Rejepow (TKM)	B	84.70	158	162	~~165~~	13	185	190	~~193~~	19	352
18	Namig Jamilov (AZE)	B	84.42	157	~~160~~	~~160~~	19	187	192	~~196~~	16	349
19	Kendrick Farris (USA)	B	84.84	153	157	~~160~~	20	192	~~198~~	~~204~~	17	349
20	Giovanni Bardis (FRA)	C	84.42	153	158	160	17	180	185	188	21	348
21	Inoýat Jumaýew (TKM)	B	84.84	~~152~~	152	157	21	~~190~~	190	~~196~~	20	347
22	Marius Mickevičius (LTU)	C	84.00	155	160	~~166~~	15	181	186	~~190~~	22	346
23	Nailkhan Nabiyev (AZE)	B	84.66	148	153	~~156~~	24	~~186~~	186	~~191~~	23	339
24	Donatas Anuškevičius (LTU)	C	84.24	150	~~155~~	~~155~~	26	180	185	~~191~~	25	335
25	Zach Krych (USA)	C	83.65	~~145~~	145	~~150~~	29	~~185~~	185	~~190~~	24	330
26	Brice Batchaya (CMR)	C	83.56	145	148	150	25	~~175~~	175	~~180~~	28	325
27	Julio Idrovo (ECU)	C	84.37	~~150~~	150	~~155~~	27	175	~~180~~	~~180~~	29	325
28	Steven Kari (PNG)	C	84.21	132	137	~~141~~	34	175	180	~~184~~	26	317
29	Bolotbek Shamshiev (KGZ)	C	83.42	130	136	140	30	166	171	175	27	315
30	Paul Dumais (CAN)	C	84.14	140	~~144~~	~~146~~	31	165	169	172	30	312
31	Malek Chamoun (AUS)	C	83.76	135	~~140~~	~~140~~	35	~~170~~	~~170~~	170	31	305
32	Yannick Sautebin (SUI)	C	79.78	125	~~130~~	~~130~~	36	~~145~~	145	150	32	275
—	Lu Yong (CHN)	A	84.78	170	~~175~~	~~175~~	5	~~205~~	~~205~~	~~205~~	—	—
—	Amar Musić (CRO)	B	84.64	150	~~154~~	~~154~~	28	~~190~~	—	—	—	—
—	Clemente Mannella (ITA)	C	84.94	135	140	~~142~~	32	~~166~~	~~166~~	~~166~~	—	—
—	Mathieu Marineau (CAN)	C	83.18	138	~~142~~	~~142~~	33	~~172~~	~~172~~	~~172~~	—	—
