= Hoàng Tấn Tài =

Vietnamese weightlifter (born 1990)

Personal information
- Full name: Hoàng Tấn Tài
- Born: 30 March 1990 (age 36)
- Height: 1.65 m (5 ft 5 in)
- Weight: 84.34 kg (186 lb)

Sport
- Country: Vietnam
- Sport: Weightlifting
Medal record
Men's Weightlifting
Representing Vietnam
SEA Games
Bronze medal – third place	2009 Vientiane	56 kg
- Updated on 28 January 2026

Hoàng Tấn Tài (born March 30, 1990) is a Vietnamese male weightlifter, competing in the 85 kg category and representing Vietnam at international competitions. He participated in the men's 85 kg event at the 2015 World Weightlifting Championships, and at the 2016 Summer Olympics, finishing in seventeenth position.

== Major results ==
Year	Venue	Weight	Snatch (kg)				Clean & Jerk (kg)				Total	Rank
Year	Venue	Weight	1	2	3	Rank	1	2	3	Rank	Total	Rank
World Championships
2015	Houston, United States	85 kg	135	141	~~146~~	32	172	180	184	18	325	22
2014	Almaty, Kazakhstan	85 kg	140	~~148~~	~~148~~	40	180	~~188~~	~~188~~	30	320	36
2013	Wrocław, Poland	85 kg	135	145	~~150~~	20	175	185	~~188~~	15	330	14
