= Kianoush Rostami =

Iranian weightlifter (born 1991)

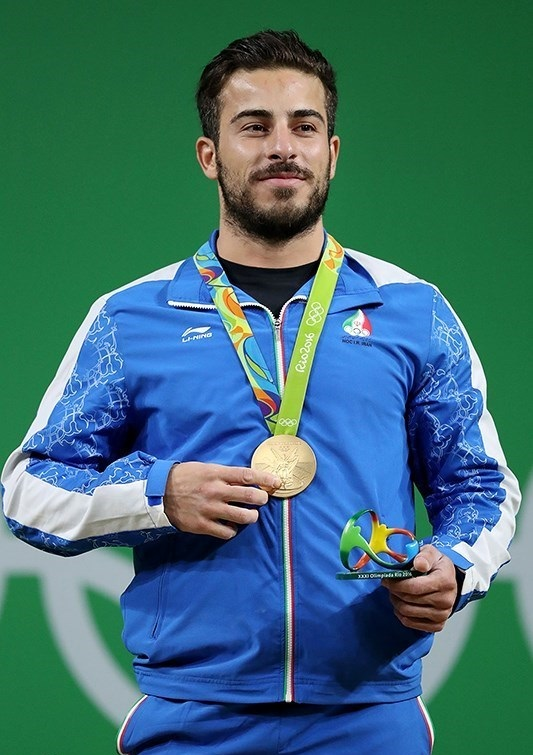
- Kianoush Rostami with gold medal at the 2016 Summer Olympics

Personal information
- Native name: کیانوش رستمی
- Nationality: Iranian
- Born: 23 July 1991 (age 35) Kermanshah, Iran
- Height: 1.75 m (5 ft 9 in) (2016)
- Weight: 89 kg (196 lb) (2021)

Sport
- Country: Iran (until 2025); Kosovo (from 2025)
- Sport: Weightlifting
- Event: –89 kg

Achievements and titles
- Personal bests: Snatch: 179 kg (2016); Clean and jerk: 225 kg (2019); Total: 403 kg (2019)
Medal record
Men's weightlifting
Representing Iran
Olympic Games
Gold medal – first place	2016 Rio de Janeiro	85 kg
Silver medal – second place	2012 London	85 kg
World Championships
Gold medal – first place	2011 Paris	85 kg
Gold medal – first place	2014 Almaty	85 kg
Silver medal – second place	2015 Houston	85 kg
Asian Games
Silver medal – second place	2014 Incheon	85 kg
Asian Championships
Gold medal – first place	2020 Tashkent	89 kg
Silver medal – second place	2011 Tongling	85 kg
Silver medal – second place	2012 Pyeongtaek	85 kg
World Junior Championships
Gold medal – first place	2010 Sofia	85 kg
Gold medal – first place	2011 Penang	85 kg
Representing Kosovo
Mediterranean Games
Silver medal – second place	2026 Taranto	95 kg S
Silver medal – second place	2026 Taranto	95 kg CJ

Kianoush Rostami (Persian: کیانوش رستمی, born 23 July 1991) is an Iranian Olympic weightlifter. He was born in Kermanshah to an ethnic Kurdish family. He competed at the 2016 Summer Olympics, in the 85 kg event, winning the gold medal and setting a new world record with a total lift of 396 kilograms.

Rostami won the silver medal at the London 2012 Summer Olympics. He originally took home the bronze medal, which ascended to a silver medal when Apti Aukhadov tested positive for dehydrochloromethyltestosterone from samples taken in 2012.

Despite having the third highest total at 96 kg in Olympic qualifying, Rostami failed to qualify for the Tokyo Olympic Games, as he sat 31st in the ROBI point rankings because he scored zero points in the second qualification period (1 May 2019 to 31 October 2019) of the 2020 Olympics after missing all three lifts in the snatch portion of the 2019 World Weightlifting Championships.

In March 2025, Rostami received Kosovo citizenship and in July 2025 he gained the right to represent Kosovo.

== Career ==
Rostami won the gold medal in the Men's 85 kg weight class at the 2011 World Weightlifting Championships.

Rostami won the silver medal at the 2012 Summer Olympics in the men's 85 kg event with a total of 380 kg. In June 2016, it was announced his silver medal ascendancy after Apti Aukhadov had tested positive for prohibited substances and therefore disqualified for a medal.

In 2016, while competing at the Fajr Cup, in Tehran, Iran, Kianoush broke the Clean and jerk world record for his weight division, lifting 220 kg. Kianoush also broke the world record for his total, with 395 kg.

Kianoush Rostami competed in the 2016 Rio Olympics, representing Iran in the 85 kg weight division. He won the gold medal in the 85 kg weight class at the 2016 Summer Olympics by tying an Olympic record with a 217 kg clean and jerk – set by Tian Tao just minutes prior – and setting a world record total with 396 kg.

== Major results ==
Year	Venue	Weight	Snatch (kg)				Clean & Jerk (kg)				Total	Rank
Year	Venue	Weight	1	2	3	Rank	1	2	3	Rank	Total	Rank
Representing Iran
Olympic Games
2012	London, United Kingdom	85 kg	171	~~174~~	~~174~~	4	209	~~214~~	~~214~~	3	380	2nd place, silver medalist(s)
2016	Rio de Janeiro, Brazil	85 kg	174	179	~~182~~	1	~~215~~	215	217	1	396	1st place, gold medalist(s)
World Championships
2010	Antalya, Turkey	77 kg	161	~~165~~	~~165~~	3rd place, bronze medalist(s)	193	~~198~~	~~198~~	5	354	4
2011	Paris, France	85 kg	169	173	~~176~~	3rd place, bronze medalist(s)	209	~~219~~	~~219~~	1st place, gold medalist(s)	382	1st place, gold medalist(s)
2014	Almaty, Kazakhstan	85 kg	173	176	178	2nd place, silver medalist(s)	~~211~~	~~212~~	213	1st place, gold medalist(s)	391	1st place, gold medalist(s)
2015	Houston, United States	85 kg	173	~~178~~	~~178~~	3rd place, bronze medalist(s)	214	~~218~~	~~219~~	2nd place, silver medalist(s)	387	2nd place, silver medalist(s)
2017	Anaheim, United States	85 kg	170	~~174~~	174	2nd place, silver medalist(s)	~~212~~	~~212~~	~~215~~	--	--	--
2019	Pattaya, Thailand	96 kg	~~180~~	~~180~~	~~180~~	--	--	--	--	--	--	--
2022	Bogotá, Colombia	89 kg	170	~~174~~	174	2nd place, silver medalist(s)	206	~~212~~	~~212~~	5	380	4
Asian Games
2010	Guangzhou, China	85 kg	159	162	165	5	200	~~205~~	~~205~~	6	365	6
2014	Incheon, South Korea	85 kg	~~166~~	166	172	1	208	~~212~~	~~212~~	2	380	2nd place, silver medalist(s)
2018	Jakarta, Indonesia	94 kg	~~175~~	175	~~185~~	2	~~218~~	~~220~~	~~220~~	--	--	--
Asian Championships
2008	Kanazawa, Japan	69 kg	126	131	~~133~~	10	--	--	--	--	--	--
2011	Tongling, China	85 kg	157	162	~~166~~	2nd place, silver medalist(s)	193	198	201	2nd place, silver medalist(s)	363	2nd place, silver medalist(s)
2012	Pyeongtaek, South Korea	85 kg	168	172	~~175~~	2nd place, silver medalist(s)	201	211	~~216~~	2nd place, silver medalist(s)	383	2nd place, silver medalist(s)
2021	Tashkent, Uzbekistan	89 kg	167	~~176~~	~~176~~	2nd place, silver medalist(s)	~~206~~	206	~~216~~	2nd place, silver medalist(s)	373	1st place, gold medalist(s)
2023	Jinju, South Korea	89 kg	165	~~172~~	~~172~~	4	186	~~207~~	~~207~~	11	351	8
Fajr Cup
2016	Tehran, Iran	85 kg	170	175	--	1st place, gold medalist(s)	210	220	--	1st place, gold medalist(s)	395	1st place, gold medalist(s)
2019	Tehran, Iran	96 kg	161	172	--	1st place, gold medalist(s)	200	210	220	1st place, gold medalist(s)	392	1st place, gold medalist(s)
2020	Rasht, Iran	96 kg	~~175~~	~~175~~	~~177~~	--	215	~~225~~	--	1st place, gold medalist(s)	--	--
Qatar Cup
2019	Doha, Qatar	96 kg	172	~~177~~	178	1st place, gold medalist(s)	210	220	225	2nd place, silver medalist(s)	403	2nd place, silver medalist(s)
World Junior Championships
2010	Sofia, Bulgaria	85 kg	152	157	160	1st place, gold medalist(s)	182	~~187~~	187	1st place, gold medalist(s)	347	1st place, gold medalist(s)
2011	Penang, Malaysia	85 kg	162	168	~~171~~	2nd place, silver medalist(s)	~~204~~	204	210	1st place, gold medalist(s)	378	1st place, gold medalist(s)
Representing Kosovo
European Championships
2026	Batumi, Georgia	88 kg	~~167~~	~~167~~	~~169~~	—	—	—	—	—	—	—
Mediterranean Games
2026	Taranto, Italy	95 kg	~~165~~	166	~~170~~	2nd place, silver medalist(s)	196	203	~~211~~	2nd place, silver medalist(s)	—	—
