= List of Universiade records in Olympic weightlifting =

The following are the universiade records in Olympic weightlifting. Records are maintained in each weight class for the snatch lift, Clean and jerk lift, and the total for both lifts by the International Weightlifting Federation.

== Men ==
Event	Record	Athlete	Nation	Date	Meet	Place	Ref
56 kg
Snatch	129 kg	Om Yun-chol	North Korea	20 August 2017	2017 Universiade	New Taipei City, Taiwan	
Clean & jerk	165 kg	Om Yun-chol	North Korea	20 August 2017	2017 Universiade	New Taipei City, Taiwan	
Total	294 kg	Om Yun-chol	North Korea	20 August 2017	2017 Universiade	New Taipei City, Taiwan	
62 kg
Snatch	140 kg	Eko Yuli Irawan	Indonesia	14 August 2011	2011 Universiade	Shenzhen, China	
Clean & jerk	171 kg	Sin Chol-bom	North Korea	20 August 2017	2017 Universiade	New Taipei City, Taiwan	
Total	310 kg	Eko Yuli Irawan	Indonesia	14 August 2011	2011 Universiade	Shenzhen, China	
69 kg
Snatch	153 kg	Kim Myong-hyok	North Korea	21 August 2017	2017 Universiade	New Taipei City, Taiwan	
Clean & jerk	185 kg	Albert Linder	Kazakhstan	21 August 2017	2017 Universiade	New Taipei City, Taiwan	
Total	333 kg	Albert Linder	Kazakhstan	21 August 2017	2017 Universiade	New Taipei City, Taiwan	
77 kg
Snatch	163 kg	Dmitriy Khomyakov	Russia	10 July 2013	2013 Universiade	Kazan, Russia	
Clean & jerk	198 kg	Rasoul Taghian	Iran	10 July 2013	2013 Universiade	Kazan, Russia	
Total	355 kg	Rasoul Taghian	Iran	10 July 2013	2013 Universiade	Kazan, Russia	
85 kg
Snatch	170 kg	Andranik Karapetyan	Armenia	23 August 2017	2017 Universiade	New Taipei City, Taiwan	
Clean & jerk	205 kg	Apti Aukhadov	Russia	11 July 2013	2013 Universiade	Kazan, Russia	
Total	372 kg	Apti Aukhadov	Russia	11 July 2013	2013 Universiade	Kazan, Russia	
94 kg
Snatch	181 kg	Aleksandr Ivanov	Russia	12 July 2013	2013 Universiade	Kazan, Russia	
Clean & jerk	214 kg	Aleksandr Ivanov	Russia	12 July 2013	2013 Universiade	Kazan, Russia	
Total	395 kg	Aleksandr Ivanov	Russia	12 July 2013	2013 Universiade	Kazan, Russia	
105 kg
Snatch	190 kg	Ruslan Nurudinov	Uzbekistan	12 July 2013	2013 Universiade	Kazan, Russia	
Clean & jerk	224 kg	David Bedzhanyan	Russia	12 July 2013	2013 Universiade	Kazan, Russia	
Total	412 kg	Ruslan Nurudinov	Uzbekistan	12 July 2013	2013 Universiade	Kazan, Russia	
+105 kg
Snatch	205 kg	Ruslan Albegov	Russia	12 July 2013	2013 Universiade	Kazan, Russia	
Clean & jerk	254 kg	Bahador Molaei	Iran	12 July 2013	2013 Universiade	Kazan, Russia	
Total	459 kg	Ruslan Albegov	Russia	12 July 2013	2013 Universiade	Kazan, Russia	

== Women ==
Event	Record	Athlete	Nation	Date	Meet	Place	Ref
48 kg
Snatch	87 kg	Xiao Hongyu	China	7 July 2013	2013 Universiade	Kazan, Russia	
Clean & jerk	108 kg	Xiao Hongyu	China	13 August 2011	2011 Universiade	Shenzhen, China	
Total	193 kg	Ri Song-gum	North Korea	20 August 2017	2017 Universiade	New Taipei City, Taiwan	
53 kg
Snatch	100 kg	Ji Jing	China	14 August 2011	2011 Universiade	Shenzhen, China	
Clean & jerk	122 kg	Ji Jing	China	14 August 2011	2011 Universiade	Shenzhen, China	
Total	222 kg	Ji Jing	China	14 August 2011	2011 Universiade	Shenzhen, China	
58 kg
Snatch	107 kg	Kuo Hsing-chun	Chinese Taipei	21 August 2017	2017 Universiade	New Taipei City, Taiwan	
Clean & jerk	142 kg	Kuo Hsing-chun	Chinese Taipei	21 August 2017	2017 Universiade	New Taipei City, Taiwan	
Total	249 kg	Kuo Hsing-chun	Chinese Taipei	21 August 2017	2017 Universiade	New Taipei City, Taiwan	
63 kg
Snatch	106 kg	Rim Un-sim	North Korea	22 August 2017	2017 Universiade	New Taipei City, Taiwan	
Clean & jerk	133 kg	Pyon Yong-Mi	North Korea	9 July 2013	2013 Universiade	Kazan, Russia	
Total	236 kg	Rim Un-sim	North Korea	22 August 2017	2017 Universiade	New Taipei City, Taiwan	
69 kg
Snatch	110 kg	Kang Yue	China	17 August 2011	2011 Universiade	Shenzhen, China	
Clean & jerk	135 kg	Oksana Slivenko	Russia	10 July 2013	2013 Universiade	Kazan, Russia	
Total	242 kg	Oksana Slivenko	Russia	10 July 2013	2013 Universiade	Kazan, Russia	
75 kg
Snatch	123 kg	Nadezhda Evstyukhina	Russia	11 July 2013	2013 Universiade	Kazan, Russia	
Clean & jerk	159 kg	Olga Zubova	Russia	11 July 2013	2013 Universiade	Kazan, Russia	
Total	279 kg	Olga Zubova	Russia	11 July 2013	2013 Universiade	Kazan, Russia	
90 kg
Snatch	111 kg	Iryna Dekha	Ukraine	25 August 2017	2017 Universiade	New Taipei City, Taiwan	
Clean & jerk	135 kg	Iryna Dekha	Ukraine	25 August 2017	2017 Universiade	New Taipei City, Taiwan	
Total	246 kg	Iryna Dekha	Ukraine	25 August 2017	2017 Universiade	New Taipei City, Taiwan	
+90 kg
Snatch	142 kg	Tatiana Kashirina	Russia	11 July 2013	2013 Universiade	Kazan, Russia	
Clean & jerk	177 kg	Tatiana Kashirina	Russia	11 July 2013	2013 Universiade	Kazan, Russia	
Total	319 kg	Tatiana Kashirina	Russia	11 July 2013	2013 Universiade	Kazan, Russia	
