= Rasoul Taghian =

Iranian weightlifter (born 1987)

Personal information
- Native name: رسول تقیان چادگانی
- Nationality: Iranian
- Born: Rasoul Taghian Chadegani; 21 January 1987 (age 39)
- Weight: 82.35 kg (181.6 lb)

Sport
- Country: Iran
- Sport: Weightlifting
- Event: 85 kg

Achievements and titles
- Personal bests: Snatch: 163 kg (2014); Clean and jerk: 205 kg (2014); Total: 368 kg (2014)
Medal record
Representing Iran
Asian Championships
Bronze medal – third place	2009 Taldykorgan	77 kg
Gold medal – first place	2013 Astana	77 kg
Summer Universiade
Gold medal – first place	2013 Kazan	77 kg

Rasoul Taghian Chadegani (Persian: رسول تقیان چادگانی, born 21 January 1987) is an Iranian weightlifter. He has won multiple medals in various weightlifting competitions, including the gold medal in the Men's 77 kg weight class at the 2013 Universiade Kazan Weightlifting Championships. In that same competition, he set new records in both the clean and jerk and the total categories. In 2013, he was named the best weightlifting athlete in Asia and ranked second in the world.

Taghian's older brother, Javad Taghian, was his first coach, and he has continued to compete at a high level in weightlifting throughout his career.

== Major results ==
Year	Venue	Weight	Snatch (kg)				Clean & Jerk (kg)				Total	Rank
Year	Venue	Weight	1	2	3	Rank	1	2	3	Rank	Total	Rank
Summer Universiade
2013	Kazan, Russia	77 kg	153	~~157~~	157	2	194	198	--	1	355	1st place, gold medalist(s)
World Championships
2013	Wrocław, Poland	77 kg	~~158~~	158	~~162~~	5	~~196~~	~~196~~	196	4	354	4
2014	Almaty, Kazakhstan	85 kg	149	153	~~156~~	22	182	190	--	21	343	22
2015	Houston, United States	77 kg	153	158	~~162~~	10	~~193~~	~~193~~	~~194~~	--	--	--
Asian Games
2014	Incheon, South Korea	85 kg	158	~~163~~	163	4	197	205	~~210~~	4	368	4
Asian Championships
2009	(Kazakhstan) Taldykorgan, kazakhstan	77 kg	146	152	~~155~~	4	183	~~187~~	187	4	339	3rd place, bronze medalist(s)
2013	(Kazakhstan) Astana, kazakhstan	77 kg	155	160	163	2nd place, silver medalist(s)	195	~~203~~	203	1st place, gold medalist(s)	366	1st place, gold medalist(s)
0
