= Mathieu Marineau =

Canadian weightlifter

Personal information
- Full name: Mathieu Marineau
- Born: 1 December 1990 (age 35) Montreal, Canada
- Weight: 84.54 kg (186.4 lb)

Sport
- Country: Canada
- Sport: Weightlifting
- Team: National team
Medal record
Commonwealth Games
Bronze medal – third place	2010 Delhi	85 kg
- Updated on 5 September 2016

Mathieu Marineau (born 1 December 1990) is a Canadian male weightlifter, competing in the 85 kg category and representing Canada at international competitions. He competed at world championships, most recently at the 2013 World Weightlifting Championships.

== Major results ==
Year	Venue	Weight	Snatch (kg)				Clean & Jerk (kg)				Total	Rank
Year	Venue	Weight	1	2	3	Rank	1	2	3	Rank	Total	Rank
World Championships
2013	Wrocław, Poland	85 kg	140	~~145~~	145	19	~~175~~	175	180	18	325	18
2011	Paris, France	85 kg	138	~~142~~	~~142~~	33	~~172~~	~~172~~	~~172~~	---	0	---
2010	Antalya, Turkey	85 kg	140	145	~~147~~	32	~~175~~	~~175~~	175	29	320	29
