= Albert Linder =

Kazakh weightlifter (1996–2021)

Personal information
- Native name: Альберт Линдер
- Nationality: Kazakh
- Born: 13 January 1996 Taldykorgan, Kazakhstan
- Died: 17 September 2021 (aged 25)
- Height: 162 cm (5 ft 4 in)
- Weight: 68.95 kg (152.0 lb)

Sport
- Country: Kazakhstan
- Sport: Olympic Weightlifting
- Event: 69 kg
- Coached by: Sergey Sedov

Achievements and titles
- Personal bests: Snatch: 148 kg (2017); Clean and jerk: 187 kg (2017); Total: 335 kg (2017)
Medal record
Representing Kazakhstan
Asian Championships
Gold medal – first place	2017 Ashgabat	— 69 kg
Summer Universiade
Gold medal – first place	2017 Taipei	— 69 kg
- Updated on 17 September 2021

Albert Linder (Kazakh: Альберт Линдер; 13 January 1996 – 17 September 2021) was a Kazakh weightlifter who competed in the men's 69 kg weight category.

== Personal life ==
Albert Linder was born on 13 January 1996, in Taldykorgan. He was the brother of Semen Linder, who is also a weightlifter. His family is of German descent.

== Career ==
Linder competed at world championships, including at the 2013 and 2014 World Weightlifting Championships. He also participated in the men's 69 kg class at 2017 Asian Weightlifting Championships in Ashgabat, Turkmenistan. He won gold - snatched 148 kg and jerked an additional 187 kg for a total of 335 kg. He won the golden medal of the 2017 Summer Universiade in the 69 kg weight category. He lifted 333 kg (148+185) in the double event.

== Death ==
Linder committed suicide on September 17, 2021, at the age of 25.

== Major results ==
Year	Venue	Weight	Snatch (kg)				Clean & Jerk (kg)				Total	Rank
Year	Venue	Weight	1	2	3	Rank	1	2	3	Rank	Total	Rank
World Championships
2013	Wrocław, Poland	69 kg	125	~~130~~	130	15	145	150	160	16	290	16
2014	Almaty, Kazakhstan	69 kg	140	145	~~150~~	6	170	~~180~~	~~183~~	16	315	10
Asian Championships
2017	Ashgabat, Turkmenistan	69 kg	143	148	~~151~~	2nd place, silver medalist(s)	178	184	187	1st place, gold medalist(s)	335	1st place, gold medalist(s)
Summer Universiade
2017	(Chinese Taipei) Taipei, Taiwan	69 kg	143	148	~~151~~	2	180	185 UR	-	1	333 UR	1st place, gold medalist(s)
World Junior Championships
2014	Kazan, Russia	69 kg	130	135	140	4	165	170	173	2nd place, silver medalist(s)	313	3rd place, bronze medalist(s)
