= 2006 World Weightlifting Championships – Men's 77 kg =

The 2006 World Weightlifting Championships were held in Santo Domingo, Dominican Republic from 30 September to 7 October. The men's 77 kilograms division was staged on 2 and 3 October 2006.

== Schedule ==
Date	Time	Event
2 October 2006	18:00	Group D
2 October 2006	20:00	Group C
3 October 2006	10:00	Group B
3 October 2006	14:00	Group A

== Medalists ==
Event	Gold		Silver		Bronze	
Snatch	Li Hongli (CHN)	167 kg	Taner Sağır (TUR)	166 kg	Ara Khachatryan (ARM)	165 kg
Clean & Jerk	Oleg Perepetchenov (RUS)	198 kg	Vladislav Lukanin (RUS)	197 kg	Taner Sağır (TUR)	195 kg
Total	Taner Sağır (TUR)	361 kg	Li Hongli (CHN)	359 kg	Ara Khachatryan (ARM)	357 kg

== Records ==
Prior to this competition, the existing world records were as follows.

World Record	Snatch	Sergey Filimonov (KAZ)	173 kg	Almaty, Kazakhstan	9 April 2004
World Record	Clean & Jerk	Oleg Perepetchenov (RUS)	210 kg	Trenčín, Slovakia	27 April 2001
World Record	Total	Plamen Zhelyazkov (BUL)	377 kg	Doha, Qatar	27 March 2002

== Results ==
Rank	Athlete	Group	Body weight	Snatch (kg)				Clean & Jerk (kg)				Total
Rank	Athlete	Group	Body weight	1	2	3	Rank	1	2	3	Rank	Total
1st place, gold medalist(s)	Taner Sağır (TUR)	A	76.82	161	164	166	2nd place, silver medalist(s)	~~195~~	195	—	3rd place, bronze medalist(s)	361
2nd place, silver medalist(s)	Li Hongli (CHN)	A	76.79	163	167	~~170~~	1st place, gold medalist(s)	192	~~197~~	~~197~~	4	359
3rd place, bronze medalist(s)	Ara Khachatryan (ARM)	A	76.82	157	161	165	3rd place, bronze medalist(s)	192	~~197~~	~~197~~	5	357
4	Vladislav Lukanin (RUS)	A	76.78	~~150~~	150	153	8	~~190~~	190	197	2nd place, silver medalist(s)	350
5	Mikalai Charniak (BLR)	A	76.89	152	156	158	4	185	190	~~193~~	8	348
6	Sebastian Dogariu (ROM)	A	76.63	150	154	~~158~~	7	180	189	~~192~~	9	343
7	Iván Cambar (CUB)	B	76.93	145	150	155	6	182	188	~~192~~	13	343
8	Yukio Peter (NRU)	A	76.85	~~147~~	147	153	9	188	~~196~~	~~196~~	11	341
9	Krzysztof Szramiak (POL)	A	76.90	147	~~150~~	150	13	188	~~193~~	~~193~~	12	338
10	René Hoch (GER)	B	76.52	~~145~~	145	149	14	181	184	188	10	337
11	Lee Jeong-jae (KOR)	A	76.67	~~147~~	147	~~153~~	16	190	~~195~~	~~197~~	7	337
12	Chad Vaughn (USA)	C	76.87	142	146	~~149~~	19	181	186	~~189~~	14	332
13	Mahmoud El-Haddad (EGY)	B	76.88	~~140~~	140	~~144~~	35	~~187~~	187	191	6	331
14	Vladimir Kuznetsov (KAZ)	B	76.95	145	~~150~~	~~150~~	22	180	~~185~~	185	17	330
15	Carlos Andica (COL)	B	76.97	142	146	~~150~~	20	180	183	—	18	329
16	Turan Mirzayev (AZE)	B	74.91	142	146	~~149~~	17	175	~~181~~	181	19	327
17	Spyridon Stamatiadis (GRE)	C	76.47	150	157	~~159~~	5	165	170	~~175~~	33	327
18	Yoelmis Hernández (CUB)	C	76.69	140	~~146~~	146	18	180	~~188~~	~~188~~	21	326
19	Edinson Angulo (COL)	C	76.19	140	~~145~~	~~145~~	32	180	185	~~187~~	16	325
20	Taulant Çerepi (ALB)	D	76.66	140	145	150	10	170	175	~~180~~	27	325
21	José Casado (ESP)	B	76.69	145	~~150~~	150	11	175	~~181~~	~~181~~	28	325
22	László Bíró (ROM)	B	76.98	140	145	~~148~~	24	172	~~177~~	179	23	324
23	Yoshito Shintani (JPN)	C	74.16	~~135~~	~~135~~	135	41	180	~~185~~	185	15	320
24	Zhenis Aldabergenov (KAZ)	C	76.31	135	~~140~~	140	33	171	~~180~~	180	20	320
25	Viktor Gumán (SVK)	C	76.82	143	~~150~~	150	12	165	170	~~173~~	35	320
26	Octavio Mejías (VEN)	C	77.00	145	~~148~~	~~148~~	25	~~175~~	175	~~180~~	29	320
27	Anani Tashev (BUL)	C	76.89	138	~~142~~	~~142~~	37	175	180	~~183~~	22	318
28	Ali El-Moujoud (FRA)	C	76.43	137	~~141~~	141	28	170	~~175~~	175	26	316
29	Viktor Mitrou (GRE)	B	76.91	145	~~150~~	~~150~~	21	~~170~~	~~170~~	170	36	315
30	Amar Musić (CRO)	B	75.82	~~142~~	142	~~146~~	26	~~171~~	171	~~176~~	30	313
31	Konstantin Gerasimov (LTU)	C	76.03	~~137~~	137	~~144~~	38	~~176~~	176	~~181~~	24	313
32	Julio Idrovo (ECU)	C	76.45	~~147~~	~~147~~	147	15	160	165	~~167~~	40	312
33	János Baranyai (HUN)	C	75.92	135	140	~~142~~	31	166	171	~~175~~	31	311
34	Maksudjan Rejepow (TKM)	C	76.96	140	~~150~~	~~150~~	36	~~165~~	165	171	32	311
35	Santo Rivera (DOM)	D	76.53	135	~~140~~	~~141~~	42	170	175	~~180~~	25	310
36	Lance Frye (USA)	C	76.67	~~140~~	140	~~145~~	34	170	~~173~~	~~173~~	34	310
37	Pavol Svrček (SVK)	D	76.95	140	145	~~148~~	23	165	~~170~~	~~170~~	41	310
38	Vitaliy Volkov (UKR)	C	76.88	137	141	~~143~~	30	164	168	~~170~~	38	309
39	Tsai Chun-nan (TPE)	D	76.93	130	135	~~137~~	43	165	~~170~~	170	37	305
40	Walter Llerena (ECU)	D	76.79	137	~~140~~	~~142~~	39	167	~~171~~	~~176~~	39	304
41	Kheela Inderjit Singh (GBR)	D	77.00	137	~~142~~	~~142~~	40	155	160	~~165~~	45	297
42	Sitthisak Suphalak (THA)	D	72.55	125	~~131~~	131	44	156	162	~~167~~	42	293
43	Bakhram Mendibaev (UZB)	D	71.51	125	~~130~~	130	45	153	~~158~~	160	44	290
44	Ádám Tóth (HUN)	D	76.74	125	~~130~~	~~132~~	46	155	~~160~~	162	43	287
45	Carlos Rojas (CHI)	D	76.32	122	~~125~~	~~125~~	47	145	150	~~153~~	47	272
46	Marco Piconese (ITA)	D	76.06	120	~~125~~	~~125~~	48	150	~~155~~	~~155~~	46	270
—	Zaur Abdullayev (AZE)	D	76.52	135	137	141	29	~~165~~	~~165~~	~~168~~	—	—
—	Andrei Guțu (MDA)	C	76.55	142	~~147~~	~~147~~	27	—	—	—	—	—
—	Sergio Martínez (ESP)	B	76.42	~~147~~	~~147~~	~~150~~	—	—	—	—	—	—
—	Giuseppe Ficco (ITA)	D	76.65	~~132~~	~~132~~	~~132~~	—	—	—	—	—	—
—	Oleg Perepetchenov (RUS)	A	77.00	~~160~~	~~160~~	~~160~~	—	190	198	—	1st place, gold medalist(s)	—
