= Amar Musić =

Croatian weightlifter (born 1987)

Personal information
- Born: 21 March 1987 (age 39) Sarajevo, SFR Yugoslavia
- Height: 1.70 m (5 ft 7 in)
- Weight: 84.43 kg (186 lb)

Sport
- Country: Croatia
- Sport: Weightlifting
Medal record
Men's weightlifting
Representing Croatia
Mediterranean Games
Gold medal – first place	2018 Tarragona	85 kg

Amar Musić (born 21 March 1987) is a Croatian male weightlifter, competing in the 85 kg category and representing Croatia at international competitions. He participated in the men's 85 kg event at the 2015 World Weightlifting Championships, and at the 2016 Summer Olympics, finishing in fifteenth position.

In July 2012, the Croatian Institute for Toxicology and Antidoping gave Musić a two-year suspension for testing positive to oxandrolone, an anabolic steroid.

== Major results ==
Year	Venue	Weight	Snatch (kg)				Clean & Jerk (kg)				Total	Rank
Year	Venue	Weight	1	2	3	Rank	1	2	3	Rank	Total	Rank
World Championships
2015	Houston, United States	85 kg	140	~~146~~	146	28	175	~~180~~	~~180~~	26	321	26
2011	Paris, France	85 kg	150	~~154~~	~~154~~	28	~~190~~	---	---	---	0	---
2010	Antalya, Turkey	85 kg	~~156~~	~~156~~	~~158~~	---	195	~~200~~	---	---	0	---
2006	Santo Domingo, Dominican Republic	77 kg	~~142~~	142	~~146~~	26	~~171~~	171	~~176~~	30	313.0	30
