= Kim Kwang-song =

North Korean weightlifter (born 1992)

Medal record
Men's Weightlifting
Representing North Korea
World Championships
Silver medal – second place	2013 Wrocław	–77 kg
Silver medal – second place	2014 Almaty	−77 kg
Disqualified	2015 Houston	–77 kg
Asian Games
Silver medal – second place	2014 Incheon	–77 kg
Asian Championships
Bronze medal – third place	2013 Astana	−77 kg

- Kim Kwang-song
- Hangul: 김광성
- RR: Gim Gwangseong
- MR: Kim Kwangsŏng

Kim Kwang-song (Korean: 김광성; born 19 February 1992) is a North Korean weightlifter. He competed at the 2013 World Championships in the Men's 77 kg, winning the silver medal.
