= Weightlifting at the 2014 Asian Games – Men's 85 kg =

Men's 85 kg at the 2014 Asian Games
- Venue: Moonlight Festival Garden Venue
- Date: 24 September 2014
- Competitors: 15 from 13 nations

Medalists
gold medal	Tian Tao	China
silver medal	Kianoush Rostami	Iran
bronze medal	Ulugbek Alimov	Uzbekistan

The men's 85 kilograms event at the 2014 Asian Games took place on 24 September 2014 at Moonlight Festival Garden Weightlifting Venue.

== Schedule ==
All times are Korea Standard Time (UTC+09:00)

Date	Time	Event
Wednesday, 24 September 2014	14:00	Group B
Wednesday, 24 September 2014	19:00	Group A

== Records ==
Prior to this competition, the existing world, Asian and Games records were as follows.

World Record	Snatch	Andrei Rybakou (BLR)	187 kg	Chiang Mai, Thailand	22 September 2007
World Record	Clean & Jerk	Zhang Yong (CHN)	218 kg	Ramat Gan, Israel	25 April 1998
World Record	Total	~~Andrei Rybakou (BLR)~~; Lu Yong (CHN)	~~394 kg~~ 394 kg	~~Beijing, China~~; Beijing, China	~~15 August 2008~~; 15 August 2008
Asian Record	Snatch	Lu Yong (CHN)	180 kg	Beijing, China	15 August 2008
Asian Record	Clean & Jerk	Zhang Yong (CHN)	218 kg	Ramat Gan, Israel	25 April 1998
Asian Record	Total	Lu Yong (CHN)	394 kg	Beijing, China	15 August 2008
Games Record	Snatch	Vyacheslav Yershov (KAZ)	175 kg	Doha, Qatar	5 December 2006
Games Record	Clean & Jerk	Shahin Nassirinia (IRI)	210 kg	Bangkok, Thailand	11 December 1998
Games Record	Total	Shahin Nassirinia (IRI)	380 kg	Bangkok, Thailand	11 December 1998

- Andrei Rybakou's world record was rescinded in 2016.

== Results ==
Legend

- NM — No mark

Rank	Athlete	Group	Body weight	Snatch (kg)				Clean & Jerk (kg)				Total
Rank	Athlete	Group	Body weight	1	2	3	Result	1	2	3	Result	Total
1st place, gold medalist(s)	Tian Tao (CHN)	A	84.57	163	~~168~~	~~168~~	163	205	~~211~~	218	218	381
2nd place, silver medalist(s)	Kianoush Rostami (IRI)	A	84.66	~~166~~	166	172	172	208	~~212~~	~~212~~	208	380
3rd place, bronze medalist(s)	Ulugbek Alimov (UZB)	A	83.24	160	164	~~167~~	164	200	205	~~216~~	205	369
4	Rasoul Taghian (IRI)	A	84.24	158	~~163~~	163	163	197	205	~~210~~	205	368
5	Yerbol Meirmanov (KAZ)	A	84.37	150	156	~~161~~	156	180	186	187	187	343
6	Inoýat Jumaýew (TKM)	A	84.08	~~150~~	155	~~160~~	155	~~181~~	181	187	187	342
7	Vikas Thakur (IND)	B	84.72	140	145	148	148	170	179	~~186~~	179	327
8	Khalil Al-Hamqan (KSA)	B	84.13	~~139~~	140	145	145	170	~~178~~	~~179~~	170	315
9	Win Naing Tun (MYA)	B	84.64	125	130	135	135	~~165~~	165	~~170~~	165	300
10	Ali Abdulredha (KUW)	B	84.05	115	~~125~~	125	125	151	157	~~165~~	157	282
11	Muhammad Habib Asghar (PAK)	B	84.93	121	~~126~~	126	126	151	~~157~~	~~157~~	151	277
12	Mustafa Karmand (AFG)	B	84.77	105	110	117	117	135	143	150	150	267
13	Saeed Shabib Al-Dosari (QAT)	B	83.92	90	96	101	101	112	120	123	123	224
—	Sa Jae-hyouk (KOR)	A	82.66	165	171	—	171	~~207~~	~~207~~	~~210~~	—	NM
—	Jeong Tae-hong (KOR)	A	84.80	~~157~~	~~157~~	~~157~~	—	—	—	—	—	NM

== New records ==
The following records were established during the competition.

Clean & Jerk	218	Tian Tao (CHN)	GR
Total	381	Tian Tao (CHN)	GR
