= János Baranyai =

Hungarian weightlifter (born 1984)

János Baranyai (born 24 June 1984) is a Hungarian weightlifter and a former judo wrestler.

== Biography ==
He was born in Oroszlány, Hungary.

He competed at the 2006 World Championships and 2007 World Championships in the 77 kg category, ranking 33rd in both events.

On 13 August 2008 at the 2008 Summer Olympics in Beijing, China, Baranyai suffered a dislocated elbow while attempting to lift 148 kg in the men's 77 kg snatch.

After a two-year recovery and training period, Baranyai returned to international competitive weightlifting, participating both in the 2010 European Championships in Minsk and the 2010 World Championships in Antalya. At both events, he competed in the 85 kg category, and finished in the 7th and 15th places, respectively.

== Major results ==
Year	Venue	Weight	Snatch (kg)				Clean & Jerk (kg)				Total	Rank
Year	Venue	Weight	1	2	3	Rank	1	2	3	Rank	Total	Rank
Representing Hungary
Olympic Games
2008	Beijing, China	77 kg	140	145	~~148~~	18	—	—	—	—	—	—
World Championships
2015	Houston, United States	85 kg	—	—	—	—	—	—	—	—	—	—
2014	Almaty, Kazakhstan	85 kg	140	145	147	33	175	~~180~~	~~180~~	37	322	34
2013	Wrocław, Poland	85 kg	~~150~~	150	155	11	188	191	~~193~~	9	346	10
2010	Antalya, Turkey	85 kg	147	152	155	18	186	190	195	12	350	15
2007	Chiang Mai, Thailand	77 kg	135	140	~~143~~	34	165	170	~~175~~	34	310	33
2006	Santo Domingo, Dominican Republic	77 kg	135	140	~~142~~	31	166	171	~~175~~	31	311	33
2003	Vancouver, Canada	77 kg	~~142.5~~	~~142.5~~	~~142.5~~	—	—	—	—	—	—	—
European Championships
2015	(Georgia (country)) Tbilisi, Georgia	85 kg	145	150	152	10	180	184	~~187~~	10	336	9
2014	Tel Aviv, Israel	85 kg	145	150	152	6	182	187	189	8	341	7
2013	Tirana, Albania	85 kg	150	155	157	7	190	~~195~~	~~195~~	6	347	6
2012	Antalya, Turkey	85 kg	155	159	162	5	190	~~196~~	~~196~~	6	352	6
2011	Kazan, Russia	85 kg	155	160	~~163~~	7	190	195	201	4	361	5
2010	Minsk, Belarus	85 kg	145	150	153	6	185	190	~~192~~	6	343	7
2008	Lignano Sabbiadoro, Italy	77 kg	140	145	147	9	170	175	178	9	325	8
2007	Strasbourg, France	77 kg	135	140	143	17	171	175	~~179~~	13	318	14
2006	Władysławowo, Poland	77 kg	135	140	143	11	173	177	181	7	324	8
