= Weightlifting at the 2012 Summer Olympics – Men's 85 kg =

Men's 85 kg at the Games of the XXX Olympiad
- Venue: ExCeL London
- Date: 3 August 2012
- Competitors: 23 from 20 nations

Medalists
1st place, gold medalist(s)		Adrian Zieliński	Poland
2nd place, silver medalist(s)		Kianoush Rostami	Iran
3rd place, bronze medalist(s)		Tarek Yehia	Egypt

The Men's 85 kilograms weightlifting event at the 2012 Summer Olympics in London, United Kingdom, took place at ExCeL London.

== Summary ==
Total score was the sum of the lifter's best result in each of the snatch and the clean and jerk, with three lifts allowed for each lift. In case of a tie, the lighter lifter won; if still tied, the lifter who took the fewest attempts to achieve the total score won. Lifters without a valid snatch score did not perform the clean and jerk.

In June 2016, following the Russian doping scandal, it was announced by IWF that retests of the samples taken from the 2012 Olympics indicated that silver medalist Apti Aukhadov had tested positive for prohibited substances (dehydrochloromethyltestosterone and drostanolone). It was confirmed that Aukhadov was stripped of his medal by the IOC on 18 October 2016

== Schedule ==
All times are British Summer Time (UTC+01:00)

Date	Time	Event
3 August 2012	10:00	Group B
3 August 2012	19:00	Group A

== Records ==
Prior to this competition, the existing world and Olympic records were as follows.

World Record	Snatch	Andrei Rybakou (BLR)	187 kg	Chiang Mai, Thailand	22 September 2007
World Record	Clean & Jerk	Zhang Yong (CHN)	218 kg	Ramat Gan, Israel	25 April 1998
World Record	Total	~~Andrei Rybakou (BLR)~~; Lu Yong (CHN)	~~394 kg~~ 394 kg	~~Beijing, China~~; Beijing, China	~~15 August 2008~~; 15 August 2008
Olympic Record	Snatch	~~Andrei Rybakou (BLR)~~; Giorgi Asanidze (GEO)	~~185 kg~~ 180 kg	~~Beijing, China~~; Sydney, Australia	~~15 August 2008~~; 23 September 2000
Olympic Record	Clean & Jerk	Pyrros Dimas (GRE)	215 kg	Sydney, Australia	23 September 2000
Olympic Record	Total	~~Andrei Rybakou (BLR)~~; Lu Yong (CHN)	~~394 kg~~ 394 kg	~~Beijing, China~~; Beijing, China	~~15 August 2008~~; 15 August 2008

- Andrei Rybakou's world and Olympic records were rescinded in 2016.

== Results ==
Rank	Athlete	Group	Body weight	Snatch (kg)				Clean & Jerk (kg)				Total
Rank	Athlete	Group	Body weight	1	2	3	Result	1	2	3	Result	Total
1st place, gold medalist(s)	Adrian Zieliński (POL)	A	84.62	170	174	~~176~~	174	~~206~~	206	211	211	385
2nd place, silver medalist(s)	Kianoush Rostami (IRI)	A	84.35	171	~~174~~	~~174~~	171	209	~~214~~	~~214~~	209	380
3rd place, bronze medalist(s)	Tarek Yehia (EGY)	A	84.70	160	165	~~167~~	165	205	210	~~216~~	210	375
4	Ivan Markov (BUL)	A	84.71	168	~~172~~	172	172	203	~~209~~	~~209~~	203	375
5	Ragab Abdelhay (EGY)	A	84.81	161	165	~~167~~	165	202	207	~~210~~	207	372
6	Yoelmis Hernández (CUB)	A	82.28	~~158~~	158	163	163	205	~~210~~	~~210~~	205	368
7	Kendrick Farris (USA)	B	84.70	~~150~~	150	155	155	190	200	~~208~~	200	355
8	Sherzodjon Yusupov (UZB)	B	84.72	150	155	~~159~~	155	180	~~195~~	195	195	350
9	Pitaya Tibnoke (THA)	B	84.47	152	~~156~~	~~156~~	152	193	196	~~202~~	196	348
10	Safaa Rashed (IRQ)	B	83.01	145	150	~~156~~	150	~~195~~	195	~~200~~	195	345
11	Richie Patterson (NZL)	B	84.46	~~150~~	150	~~154~~	150	183	186	~~195~~	186	336
12	Steven Kari (PNG)	B	84.74	135	140	~~145~~	140	175	180	~~185~~	180	320
13	Nezir Sağır (TUR)	B	83.45	~~130~~	130	140	140	160	170	175	175	315
—	Mansur Rejepow (TKM)	B	84.57	160	~~165~~	~~168~~	160	~~188~~	~~188~~	~~190~~	—	—
—	Lu Yong (CHN)	A	84.54	175	178	~~180~~	178	~~205~~	~~205~~	~~205~~	—	—
—	Sohrab Moradi (IRI)	A	84.19	~~166~~	~~166~~	~~166~~	—	—	—	—	—	—
—	Benjamin Hennequin (FRA)	A	84.44	~~163~~	~~163~~	~~163~~	—	—	—	—	—	—
—	Ara Khachatryan (ARM)	B	84.74	~~165~~	~~165~~	~~165~~	—	—	—	—	—	—
—	Andrei Rybakou (BLR)	A	84.09	~~175~~	~~175~~	~~180~~	—	—	—	—	—	—
DQ	Apti Aukhadov (RUS)	A	84.75	169	173	175	175	205	210	~~212~~	210	~~385~~
DQ	Mikalai Novikau (BLR)	B	84.71	163	167	~~170~~	167	192	196	~~200~~	196	~~363~~
DQ	Rauli Tsirekidze (GEO)	B	84.49	162	~~167~~	~~167~~	162	195	200	~~202~~	200	~~362~~
DQ	Gabriel Sîncrăian (ROU)	A	84.07	~~167~~	~~167~~	~~167~~	—	—	—	—	—	—

- Apti Aukhadov of Russia originally finished second, but was disqualified after he tested positive for dehydrochloromethyltestosterone and drostanolone.
- Mikalai Novikau of Belarus originally finished eighth, but was disqualified after he tested positive for dehydrochloromethyltestosterone and stanozolol.
- Rauli Tsirekidze of Georgia originally finished ninth, but was disqualified after he tested positive for dehydrochloromethyltestosterone and stanozolol.
- Gabriel Sîncrăian of Romania, who failed to achieve a total, was disqualified after he tested positive for Exogenous Anabolic Androgenic Steroids.
