= 2019 World Weightlifting Championships – Men's 96 kg =

The men's 96 kg competition at the 2019 World Weightlifting Championships was held on 23 and 24 September 2019.

== Schedule ==
Date	Time	Event
23 September 2019	22:30	Group D
24 September 2019	10:00	Group C
24 September 2019	14:25	Group B
24 September 2019	17:55	Group A

== Medalists ==
Event	Gold		Silver		Bronze	
Snatch	Anton Pliesnoi (GEO)	181 kg	Tian Tao (CHN)	180 kg	Jhonatan Rivas (COL)	179 kg
Clean & Jerk	Tian Tao (CHN)	230 kg	Fares El-Bakh (QAT)	224 kg	Ayoub Mousavi (IRI)	214 kg
Total	Tian Tao (CHN)	410 kg	Fares El-Bakh (QAT)	402 kg	Anton Pliesnoi (GEO)	394 kg

== Records ==
Prior to this competition, the existing world records were as follows.

World record	Snatch	Sohrab Moradi (IRI)	186 kg	Ashgabat, Turkmenistan	7 November 2018
World record	Clean & Jerk	Tian Tao (CHN)	231 kg	Tokyo, Japan	7 July 2019
World record	Total	Sohrab Moradi (IRI)	416 kg	Ashgabat, Turkmenistan	7 November 2018

== Results ==
Rank	Athlete	Group	Snatch (kg)				Clean & Jerk (kg)				Total
Rank	Athlete	Group	1	2	3	Rank	1	2	3	Rank	Total
1st place, gold medalist(s)	Tian Tao (CHN)	A	~~175~~	~~175~~	180	2nd place, silver medalist(s)	218	~~225~~	230	1st place, gold medalist(s)	410
2nd place, silver medalist(s)	Fares El-Bakh (QAT)	A	174	178	~~181~~	4	217	224	~~230~~	2nd place, silver medalist(s)	402
3rd place, bronze medalist(s)	Anton Pliesnoi (GEO)	A	172	177	181	1st place, gold medalist(s)	203	209	213	4	394
4	Jhonatan Rivas (COL)	A	175	179	~~182~~	3rd place, bronze medalist(s)	206	~~212~~	212	5	391
5	Ayoub Mousavi (IRI)	A	~~167~~	168	~~173~~	9	~~205~~	206	214	3rd place, bronze medalist(s)	382
6	Boady Santavy (CAN)	A	170	~~175~~	~~175~~	5	~~203~~	203	210	6	380
7	Khetag Khugaev (RUS)	A	~~165~~	165	170	7	201	206	~~212~~	8	376
8	Jeyson Arias (VEN)	B	160	~~164~~	164	12	200	~~203~~	205	9	369
9	Jang Yeon-hak (KOR)	B	~~164~~	164	~~169~~	11	197	203	~~206~~	10	367
10	Bekdoolot Rasulbekov (KGZ)	A	165	170	~~176~~	6	197	~~203~~	~~203~~	18	367
11	Ángel Luna (VEN)	B	161	~~168~~	~~168~~	17	~~203~~	203	—	11	364
12	Vadims Koževņikovs (LAT)	B	153	158	~~161~~	24	201	206	~~210~~	7	364
13	Ilya Ilyin (KAZ)	A	165	168	~~171~~	8	195	~~200~~	~~200~~	20	363
14	Illia Kulikov (UKR)	B	155	~~160~~	160	20	195	200	~~205~~	14	360
15	Jürgen Spieß (GER)	B	155	160	~~163~~	19	190	195	200	15	360
16	İbrahim Arat (TUR)	A	160	~~165~~	~~165~~	21	200	~~205~~	~~206~~	16	360
17	Chen Po-jen (TPE)	B	160	165	~~170~~	10	193	~~198~~	~~200~~	21	358
18	Wilmer Contreras (ECU)	C	154	158	~~160~~	23	190	195	~~197~~	19	353
19	Kyryl Pyrohov (UKR)	B	162	~~167~~	~~167~~	14	185	191	~~195~~	24	353
20	Nathan Damron (USA)	B	155	~~160~~	~~161~~	28	190	197	~~202~~	17	352
21	Don Opeloge (SAM)	C	151	~~156~~	~~156~~	31	190	200	~~205~~	13	351
22	Marco Gregório (BRA)	C	160	~~164~~	~~164~~	18	185	190	~~195~~	25	350
23	Łukasz Grela (POL)	B	~~161~~	~~162~~	162	15	187	~~192~~	~~193~~	27	349
24	Tudor Ciobanu (MDA)	D	150	155	~~160~~	26	182	~~190~~	192	22	347
25	Jason Bonnick (USA)	C	152	~~157~~	157	25	~~183~~	183	190	26	347
26	Steven Kari (PNG)	D	135	145	~~155~~	33	185	196	200	12	345
27	Artur Babayan (RUS)	C	155	159	161	16	184	~~190~~	~~190~~	32	345
28	Zaynobiddin Makhamadaminov (UZB)	C	~~155~~	155	159	22	185	~~189~~	—	29	344
29	Nailkhan Nabiyev (AZE)	D	140	~~145~~	147	32	182	191	~~196~~	23	338
30	Saddam Messaoui (ALG)	C	~~152~~	152	~~157~~	29	186	~~191~~	~~191~~	28	338
31	Israël Kaikilekofe (FRA)	C	151	~~156~~	~~156~~	30	~~180~~	180	185	31	336
32	Nicolae Onică (ROU)	C	145	~~155~~	~~155~~	34	~~185~~	185	~~190~~	30	330
33	Edmon Avetisyan (GBR)	D	143	~~147~~	~~147~~	36	180	~~185~~	~~185~~	33	323
34	Luis Lamenza (PUR)	D	143	~~148~~	~~148~~	35	175	~~181~~	~~182~~	34	318
35	Keven Morales (PUR)	D	132	~~136~~	~~138~~	38	170	~~175~~	~~175~~	35	302
36	John Cheah (SGP)	D	130	133	~~136~~	37	162	~~165~~	~~165~~	36	295
—	Serafim Veli (BRA)	C	163	~~168~~	—	13	—	—	—	—	—
—	Izzatbek Meredow (TKM)	C	~~155~~	155	~~159~~	27	~~185~~	~~185~~	~~185~~	—	—
—	Kianoush Rostami (IRI)	A	~~180~~	~~180~~	~~180~~	—	—	—	—	—	—
