= Andrei Bîrcă =

Moldovan weightlifter (born 1988)

Personal information
- Born: 23 March 1988 (age 36)
- Weight: 76.36 kg (168.3 lb)

Sport
- Country: Moldova
- Sport: Weightlifting
- Team: National team
- Updated on 7 September 2016

Andrei Bîrcă (born 23 March 1988) is a Moldovan male weightlifter, competing in the 77 kg category and representing Moldova at international competitions. He competed at world championships, most recently at the 2010 World Weightlifting Championships.

== Major results ==
Year	Venue	Weight	Snatch (kg)				Clean & Jerk (kg)				Total	Rank
Year	Venue	Weight	1	2	3	Rank	1	2	3	Rank	Total	Rank
World Championships
2010	Antalya, Turkey	77 kg	140	144	146	19	170	175	178	17	324	14
