= Ivan Markov (weightlifter) =

Bulgarian weightlifter (born 1988)

Personal information
- Born: 14 September 1988 (age 38) Burgas, Bulgaria
- Height: 1.75 m (5 ft 9 in)
- Weight: 85 kg (187 lb)

Sport
- Country: Bulgaria
- Sport: Olympic weightlifting
- Event: –81 kg
Medal record
Men's weightlifting
Representing Bulgaria
World Championships
Silver medal – second place	2013 Wrocław	–85 kg
Silver medal – second place	2014 Almaty	–85 kg
European Championships
Gold medal – first place	2014 Tel Aviv	–85 kg
Gold medal – first place	2013 Tirana	–85 kg

Ivan Markov (Bulgarian: Иван Марков; born 14 September 1988) is a Bulgarian weightlifter competing in the 85 kg category. He is the younger brother of former world champion weightlifter Georgi Markov. He placed fifth at the 2012 Summer Olympics. Markov also qualified for the 2008 Summer Olympics but he was one of eleven Bulgarian weightlifters who tested positive for a banned steroid two months prior to the games. Bulgaria withdrew its whole team from the Olympic competition and Markov received a four-year ban from competition.
