= 2013 World Weightlifting Championships – Men's 77 kg =

The men's competition in the –77 kg division was held on 24 October 2013 in Centennial Hall, Wrocław, Poland.

== Schedule ==
Date	Time	Event
24 October 2013	12:00	Group B
24 October 2013	19:55	Group A

== Medalists ==
Event	Gold		Silver		Bronze	
Snatch	Lü Xiaojun (CHN)	176 kg	Kim Kwang-song (PRK)	163 kg	Krzysztof Zwarycz (POL)	161 kg
Clean & Jerk	Lü Xiaojun (CHN)	204 kg	Ulugbek Alimov (UZB)	197 kg	Kim Kwang-song (PRK)	196 kg
Total	Lü Xiaojun (CHN)	380 kg	Kim Kwang-song (PRK)	359 kg	Ulugbek Alimov (UZB)	355 kg

== Records ==
Prior to this competition, the existing world records were as follows.

World Record	Snatch	Lü Xiaojun (CHN)	175 kg	London, United Kingdom	1 August 2012
World Record	Clean & Jerk	Oleg Perepetchenov (RUS)	210 kg	Trenčín, Slovakia	27 April 2001
World Record	Total	Lü Xiaojun (CHN)	379 kg	London, United Kingdom	1 August 2012

== Results ==
Rank	Athlete	Group	Body weight	Snatch (kg)				Clean & Jerk (kg)				Total
Rank	Athlete	Group	Body weight	1	2	3	Rank	1	2	3	Rank	Total
1st place, gold medalist(s)	Lü Xiaojun (CHN)	A	76.40	165	170	176	1st place, gold medalist(s)	196	204	—	1st place, gold medalist(s)	380
2nd place, silver medalist(s)	Kim Kwang-song (PRK)	A	76.32	155	161	163	2nd place, silver medalist(s)	187	193	196	3rd place, bronze medalist(s)	359
3rd place, bronze medalist(s)	Ulugbek Alimov (UZB)	A	76.31	~~155~~	155	158	4	195	197	~~201~~	2nd place, silver medalist(s)	355
4	Rasoul Taghian (IRI)	A	76.54	~~158~~	158	~~162~~	5	~~196~~	~~196~~	196	4	354
5	Krzysztof Zwarycz (POL)	A	76.64	158	161	~~164~~	3rd place, bronze medalist(s)	190	~~195~~	~~196~~	7	351
6	Erkand Qerimaj (ALB)	A	76.23	155	~~159~~	~~160~~	6	191	~~196~~	~~196~~	5	346
7	Richard Tkáč (SVK)	A	76.81	148	153	~~156~~	7	180	185	~~190~~	8	338
8	Edinson Angulo (COL)	A	76.15	143	~~146~~	146	12	185	190	~~194~~	6	336
9	Gabriel Mena (COL)	A	76.32	145	~~150~~	150	8	177	181	183	9	333
10	Alejandro González (ESP)	B	76.57	142	146	147	10	178	183	~~186~~	10	330
11	Jakob Neufeld (GER)	B	76.96	142	145	147	11	171	175	~~179~~	12	322
12	Hugo Catalán (ARG)	B	73.73	135	140	~~143~~	14	164	167	171	13	311
13	Raúl Sánchez (VEN)	B	73.07	140	~~145~~	~~145~~	13	170	~~175~~	—	14	310
14	James Tatum (USA)	B	76.79	138	~~141~~	~~142~~	15	160	~~165~~	166	16	304
—	Demir Demirev (BUL)	A	76.35	145	150	~~152~~	9	~~185~~	~~185~~	~~185~~	—	—
—	José Ocando (VEN)	B	76.59	~~135~~	~~135~~	~~135~~	—	175	~~182~~	~~185~~	11	—
—	Toshiki Yamamoto (JPN)	B	76.90	~~140~~	~~140~~	~~140~~	—	168	~~173~~	~~177~~	15	—
—	Dumitru Captari (MDA)	A	76.98	~~145~~	~~145~~	~~145~~	—	~~181~~	~~181~~	—	—	—
—	Alexandru Roșu (ROU)	B	76.49	~~140~~	—	—	—	—	—	—	—	—

== New records ==
Snatch	176 kg	Lü Xiaojun (CHN)	WR
Total	380 kg	Lü Xiaojun (CHN)	WR
