= 2010 World Weightlifting Championships – Men's 77 kg =

The men's competition in the middleweight (– 77 kg) division was held on 22 and 23 September 2010.

== Schedule ==
Date	Time	Event
22 September 2010	10:00	Group D
22 September 2010	12:00	Group C
23 September 2010	14:00	Group B
23 September 2010	20:00	Group A

== Medalists ==
Event	Gold		Silver		Bronze	
Snatch	Tigran Martirosyan (ARM)	173 kg	Lü Xiaojun (CHN)	170 kg	Kianoush Rostami (IRI)	161 kg
Clean & Jerk	Lü Xiaojun (CHN)	200 kg	Tigran Martirosyan (ARM)	200 kg	Tarek Yehia (EGY)	199 kg
Total	Tigran Martirosyan (ARM)	373 kg	Lü Xiaojun (CHN)	370 kg	Tarek Yehia (EGY)	356 kg

== Records ==
Prior to this competition, the existing world records were as follows.

World Record	Snatch	Lü Xiaojun (CHN)	174 kg	Goyang, South Korea	24 November 2009
World Record	Clean & Jerk	Oleg Perepetchenov (RUS)	210 kg	Trenčín, Slovakia	27 April 2001
World Record	Total	Lü Xiaojun (CHN)	378 kg	Goyang, South Korea	24 November 2009

== Results ==
Rank	Athlete	Group	Body weight	Snatch (kg)				Clean & Jerk (kg)				Total
Rank	Athlete	Group	Body weight	1	2	3	Rank	1	2	3	Rank	Total
1st place, gold medalist(s)	Tigran Martirosyan (ARM)	A	76.72	165	170	173	1st place, gold medalist(s)	~~200~~	200	~~205~~	2nd place, silver medalist(s)	373
2nd place, silver medalist(s)	Lü Xiaojun (CHN)	A	76.42	165	170	~~175~~	2nd place, silver medalist(s)	200	~~206~~	~~206~~	1st place, gold medalist(s)	370
3rd place, bronze medalist(s)	Tarek Yehia (EGY)	A	76.53	150	155	157	6	192	199	~~200~~	3rd place, bronze medalist(s)	356
4	Kianoush Rostami (IRI)	A	76.31	161	~~165~~	~~165~~	3rd place, bronze medalist(s)	193	~~198~~	~~198~~	5	354
5	Ramzi Bahloul (TUN)	B	76.51	152	156	160	4	182	~~191~~	192	6	352
6	Erkand Qerimaj (ALB)	A	76.84	~~150~~	150	155	9	185	191	196	4	351
7	Ibrahim Ramadan (EGY)	B	76.25	145	150	155	8	182	190	~~194~~	7	345
8	Krzysztof Szramiak (POL)	A	76.77	156	~~161~~	~~161~~	7	~~186~~	186	~~190~~	10	342
9	Pang Kum-chol (PRK)	A	76.78	~~150~~	150	~~155~~	12	~~190~~	190	~~200~~	8	340
10	Alexandru Roșu (ROU)	B	76.92	145	149	~~152~~	14	~~182~~	182	188	9	337
11	Alexandru Dudoglo (MDA)	B	76.44	150	153	~~156~~	10	176	180	183	12	336
12	Richard Tkáč (SVK)	B	76.67	143	148	~~153~~	16	174	178	182	13	330
13	Semih Yağcı (TUR)	A	76.85	150	~~156~~	~~156~~	13	180	~~188~~	~~190~~	15	330
14	Andrei Bîrcă (MDA)	B	76.36	140	144	146	19	170	175	178	17	324
15	Jakob Neufeld (GER)	B	76.87	140	143	145	20	170	174	178	18	323
16	Turan Mirzayev (AZE)	C	76.05	138	~~142~~	~~142~~	26	175	180	184	11	322
17	Yony Andica (COL)	B	75.30	140	~~144~~	~~144~~	24	~~180~~	~~180~~	180	14	320
18	Freddy Tenorio (ECU)	B	75.96	140	144	148	15	~~172~~	~~172~~	172	22	320
19	Chad Vaughn (USA)	C	77.00	141	144	~~147~~	22	175	~~180~~	~~180~~	21	319
20	Raúl Sánchez (VEN)	C	73.58	142	~~147~~	147	17	170	~~175~~	~~175~~	24	317
21	Welisson Silva (BRA)	D	76.89	135	141	145	21	165	~~171~~	171	23	316
22	Yoshito Shintani (JPN)	C	75.26	~~130~~	130	135	27	~~175~~	175	178	16	313
23	Suchat Somboon (THA)	C	76.46	~~135~~	135	~~140~~	28	168	172	177	19	312
24	Viktor Gumán (SVK)	C	76.98	~~145~~	~~145~~	147	18	160	165	~~170~~	29	312
25	José Ocando (VEN)	C	77.00	135	~~140~~	~~140~~	29	170	176	~~180~~	20	311
26	Giorgio De Luca (ITA)	C	73.19	~~135~~	135	140	23	165	~~170~~	~~170~~	26	305
27	Inoýat Jumaýew (TKM)	C	76.90	135	140	~~144~~	25	165	~~172~~	~~172~~	28	305
28	Zamirbek Ashyrbaev (KGZ)	D	76.55	125	130	~~133~~	31	155	161	166	25	296
29	Samuel Shendy (INA)	D	76.46	125	130	~~133~~	30	160	~~165~~	165	27	295
30	Rustem Sybay (KAZ)	D	76.40	120	~~125~~	~~125~~	34	~~150~~	150	~~155~~	30	270
31	Yannick Sautebin (SUI)	D	76.96	~~125~~	~~125~~	125	33	~~143~~	143	~~147~~	31	268
32	Khati Mabuya (RSA)	D	74.34	~~110~~	110	~~113~~	35	~~135~~	135	~~140~~	33	245
—	Su Dajin (CHN)	A	76.86	~~160~~	160	~~165~~	5	~~197~~	~~197~~	~~198~~	—	—
—	Kuanysh Rakhatov (KAZ)	B	76.62	150	—	—	11	—	—	—	—	—
—	Jean-Marc Béland (CAN)	D	76.96	125	~~129~~	~~130~~	32	~~150~~	~~150~~	~~150~~	—	—
—	Cathal Byrd (IRL)	D	75.62	~~110~~	~~110~~	~~110~~	—	140	~~148~~	~~148~~	32	—
—	Gevorg Davtyan (ARM)	A	76.96	~~163~~	~~163~~	~~163~~	—	—	—	—	—	—
—	Safaa Rashed (IRQ)	C	76.78	141	~~146~~	~~146~~	—	177	181	~~185~~	—	—
—	Mustafa Al-Mulad (KSA)	D	76.59	120	125	~~127~~	—	151	~~157~~	~~157~~	—	—
—	Abdullah Al-Masoud (KSA)	D	71.30	117	123	~~124~~	—	142	~~152~~	~~152~~	—	—
—	Orges Tafilaj (KOS)	D	75.85	~~63~~	63	64	—	75	76	—	—	—
