= Tian Tao =

Chinese weightlifter (born 1994)

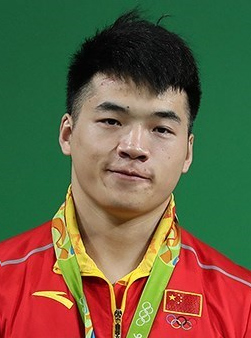
- Tian at the 2016 Olympics

Personal information
- Nationality: Chinese
- Born: 8 April 1994 (age 32) Changyang, Hubei, China
- Height: 1.73 m (5 ft 8 in)
- Weight: 89 kg (196 lb)

Sport
- Country: China
- Sport: Weightlifting
- Event: –89 kg
- Club: Hubei Province
- Coached by: Yu Jie

Achievements and titles
- Personal bests: Snatch: 181 kg (2018); Clean and jerk: 231 kg (2019 CWR); Total: 410 kg (2019)
Medal record
Representing China
Olympic Games
Silver medal – second place	2016 Rio de Janeiro	85 kg
World Championships
Gold medal – first place	2019 Pattaya	96 kg
Silver medal – second place	2018 Ashgabat	96 kg
Asian Games
Gold medal – first place	2014 Incheon	85 kg
Gold medal – first place	2022 Hangzhou	96 kg
Asian Championships
Gold medal – first place	2019 Ningbo	96 kg
Gold medal – first place	2020 Tashkent	96 kg
Silver medal – second place	2023 Jinju	89 kg
National Games of China
Gold medal – first place	2017 Tianjin	85 kg
Gold medal – first place	2021 Shaanxi	96 kg
Bronze medal – third place	2013 Liaoning	85 kg

Tian Tao (Chinese: 田涛; pinyin: Tián Tāo; born 8 April 1994) is a Chinese weightlifter, Olympian, World Champion, Asian Champion and Asian Games Champion competing in the 85 kg division until 2018 and 96 kg starting in 2018 after the International Weightlifting Federation reorganized the categories.

== Career ==
Tao took up weightlifting in Changyang at ten years of age. He first rose to national prominence after winning the 77 kg category of the Chinese Intercity Games in October 2011 at the age of 17. Although not recognized for not being an international event, his lifts far exceeded the official Youth World Records (by 6/23/35 kg respectively), the jerk of 205 kg even beating the Junior World Record by 3 kg.

Tian's next competition was the April 2012 National Championships where he attempted to qualify for the London Olympic Games. With his total of 365 kg he was however beaten by Lu Haojie and Lu Xiaojun to third place and didn't make the national team. During his second attempt in the jerk with 211 kg he also injured his right elbow and had to rehab for the rest of the year.

In 2013, he moved up to the 85 kg class and competed in January at the Australian Youth Olympic Festival, winning the bronze medal. In the March National Championships he won the snatch with 165 kg but had to retire early again due to injury after only one successful jerk, not placing on the overall podium. Later this year in September at the domestically prestigious Chinese National Games he placed third with only two good attempts. He was nevertheless chosen to represent China at the 2013 World Championships, where he was forced to drop out after the snatch part of the competition.

== Major results ==
Year	Venue	Weight	Snatch (kg)				Clean & Jerk (kg)				Total	Rank
Year	Venue	Weight	1	2	3	Rank	1	2	3	Rank	Total	Rank
Olympic Games
2016	Rio de Janeiro, Brazil	85 kg	~~173~~	~~178~~	178	2	~~210~~	~~210~~	217 OR	2	395	2nd place, silver medalist(s)
World Championships
2013	Wrocław, Poland	85 kg	160	~~165~~	~~165~~	9	—	—	—	—	—	—
2014	Almaty, Kazakhstan	85 kg	165	170	~~175~~	6	205	~~211~~	~~219~~	5	375	6
2015	Houston, United States	85 kg	173	~~178~~	178	1st place, gold medalist(s)	~~211~~	~~211~~	~~211~~	—	—	—
2018	Ashgabat, Turkmenistan	96 kg	175	~~181~~	181	2nd place, silver medalist(s)	215	226	~~236~~	2nd place, silver medalist(s)	407	2nd place, silver medalist(s)
2019	Pattaya, Thailand	96 kg	~~175~~	~~175~~	180	2nd place, silver medalist(s)	218	~~225~~	230	1st place, gold medalist(s)	410	1st place, gold medalist(s)
2022	Bogotá, Colombia	89 kg	—	—	—	—	—	—	—	—	—	—
2023	Riyadh, Saudi Arabia	89 kg	168	~~173~~	~~176~~	7	~~209~~	~~212~~	~~214~~	—	—	—
Asian Games
2014	Incheon, South Korea	85 kg	163	~~168~~	~~168~~	5	205	~~211~~	218	1	381	1st place, gold medalist(s)
2023	Hangzhou, China	96 kg	170	175	180	1	~~210~~	210	~~216~~	2	390	1st place, gold medalist(s)
Asian Championships
2019	Ningbo, China	96 kg	175	181	~~183~~	1st place, gold medalist(s)	220	~~231~~	~~231~~	1st place, gold medalist(s)	401	1st place, gold medalist(s)
2020	Tashkent, Uzbekistan	96 kg	170	175	~~180~~	1st place, gold medalist(s)	~~210~~	211	—	1st place, gold medalist(s)	386	1st place, gold medalist(s)
2023	Jinju, South Korea	89 kg	165	~~172~~	~~172~~	3rd place, bronze medalist(s)	210	~~222~~	222 WR	1st place, gold medalist(s)	387	2nd place, silver medalist(s)
IWF World Cup
2024	Phuket, Thailand	89 kg	171	~~176~~	~~177~~	4	~~215~~	~~226~~	~~226~~	—	—	—
