= Lee Jeong-jae =

South Korean weightlifter (born 1972)

Personal information
- Full name: Lee Jeong-Jae
- Born: 7 September 1981 (age 44)
- Weight: 76.67 kg (169.0 lb)

Sport
- Country: South Korea
- Sport: Weightlifting
- Weight class: 77 kg
- Team: National team
- Updated on 10 September 2016

Lee Jeong-Jae (Korean: 이정재; born 7 September 1981) is a South Korean male weightlifter, competing in the 77 kg category and representing South Korea at international competitions. He competed at world championships, most recently at the 2006 World Weightlifting Championships.

== Major results ==
Year	Venue	Weight	Snatch (kg)				Clean & Jerk (kg)				Total	Rank
Year	Venue	Weight	1	2	3	Rank	1	2	3	Rank	Total	Rank
World Championships
2006	Santo Domingo, Dominican Republic	77 kg	~~147~~	147	~~153~~	16	190	~~195~~	~~197~~	7	337.0	11
