= Artem Okulov =

Russian weightlifter (born 1994)

Artyom Okulov
Personal information
- Full name: Artyom Maksimovich Okulov
- Nationality: Russia
- Born: 5 May 1994 (age 32)
- Height: 1.65 m (5 ft 5 in)
- Weight: 88.44 kg (195.0 lb)

Sport
- Country: Russia
- Sport: Weightlifting
- Event: –89 kg
- Coached by: Vasiliy Belyaev
Medal record
Men's weightlifting
Representing Russia
World Championships
Gold medal – first place	2015 Houston	–85 kg
Gold medal – first place	2018 Ashgabat	–89 kg
Bronze medal – third place	2013 Wroclaw	–85 kg
Bronze medal – third place	2014 Almaty	–85 kg
European Championships
Silver medal – second place	2017 Split	–85 kg
Youth Olympic Games
Gold medal – first place	2010 Singapore	77 kg
Summer Universiade
Silver medal – second place	2013 Kazan	–85 kg

Artyom Maksimovich Okulov (Russian: Артём Максимович Окулов, born 5 May 1994) is a Russian weightlifter, and two-time world champion competing in the 85 kg category until 2018 and 89 kg starting in 2018 after the International Weightlifting Federation reorganized the categories.

== Career ==
At the 2010 Summer Youth Olympics he won the gold medal in the 77 kg category with a total of 327 kg.

He was the bronze medalist in the 85 kg category at both the 2013 and 2014 World Championships.

In 2015 he became world champion in the 85 kg category, and Okulov was named Honored Master of Sports of Russia, the highest national sports title.

In 2018, the International Weightlifting Federation restructured the weight categories, and Okulov competed in, and won the 89 kg category becoming World Champion again.

== Major results ==
Year	Venue	Weight	Snatch (kg)				Clean & Jerk (kg)				Total	Rank
Year	Venue	Weight	1	2	3	Rank	1	2	3	Rank	Total	Rank
World Championships
2013	Wrocław, Poland	85 kg	165	170	172	5	200	~~207~~	209	2nd place, silver medalist(s)	381	3rd place, bronze medalist(s)
2014	Almaty, Kazakhstan	85 kg	170	174	~~177~~	4	205	211	~~218~~	3rd place, bronze medalist(s)	385	3rd place, bronze medalist(s)
2015	Houston, United States	85 kg	168	174	176	2nd place, silver medalist(s)	205	211	215	1st place, gold medalist(s)	391	1st place, gold medalist(s)
2018	Ashgabat, Turkmenistan	89 kg	161	166	~~168~~	8	202	206	~~210~~	1st place, gold medalist(s)	372	1st place, gold medalist(s)
European Championships
2017	Split, Croatia	85 kg	165	~~170~~	~~170~~	2nd place, silver medalist(s)	198	203	212	1st place, gold medalist(s)	377	2nd place, silver medalist(s)
2026	(Georgia (country)) Batumi, Georgia	88 kg	156	~~161~~	~~163~~	9	196	~~202~~	—	4	352	8
