= Rauli Tsirekidze =

Georgian weightlifter (born 1987)

Personal information
- Born: 24 May 1987 (age 39) Kutaisi, Georgian SSR, Soviet Union

Sport
- Country: Georgia
- Sport: Weightlifting
Medal record
European Championships
Gold medal – first place	2012 Antalya	–85 kg
Bronze medal – third place	2013 Tirana	–85 kg

Rauli Tsirekidze or Raul Tsirek'idze (Georgian: რაულ ცირეკიძე; born 24 May 1987, in Kutaisi, Georgian SSR) is a Georgian weightlifter competing in the 85 kg category. He participated in the 2008 and 2012 Summer Olympics.

On 21 November 2016 the IOC disqualified him from the 2012 Olympic Games and struck his results from the record for failing a drugs test in a re-analysis of his doping sample from 2012.
