= Tarek Yehia (weightlifter) =

Egyptian weightlifter (born 1987)

Personal information
- Full name: Tarek Yehia Fouad Abdelazim
- Nationality: Egyptian
- Born: 18 May 1987 (age 39) Al-Minya, Egypt
Medal record
Men's weightlifting
Representing Egypt
Olympic Games
Bronze medal – third place	2012 London	85 kg
World Championships
Bronze medal – third place	2010 Antalya	77 kg

Tarek Yehia Fouad Abdelazim (born 18 May 1987), known as Tarek Abdelazim or Tarek Yehia, is an Egyptian weightlifter. He was awarded the bronze medal in 85 kg event at 2012 London Olympic Games retroactively after the Russian silver medalist Apti Aukhadov failed a doping test.
