= Adrian Zieliński =

Polish weightlifter (born 1989)

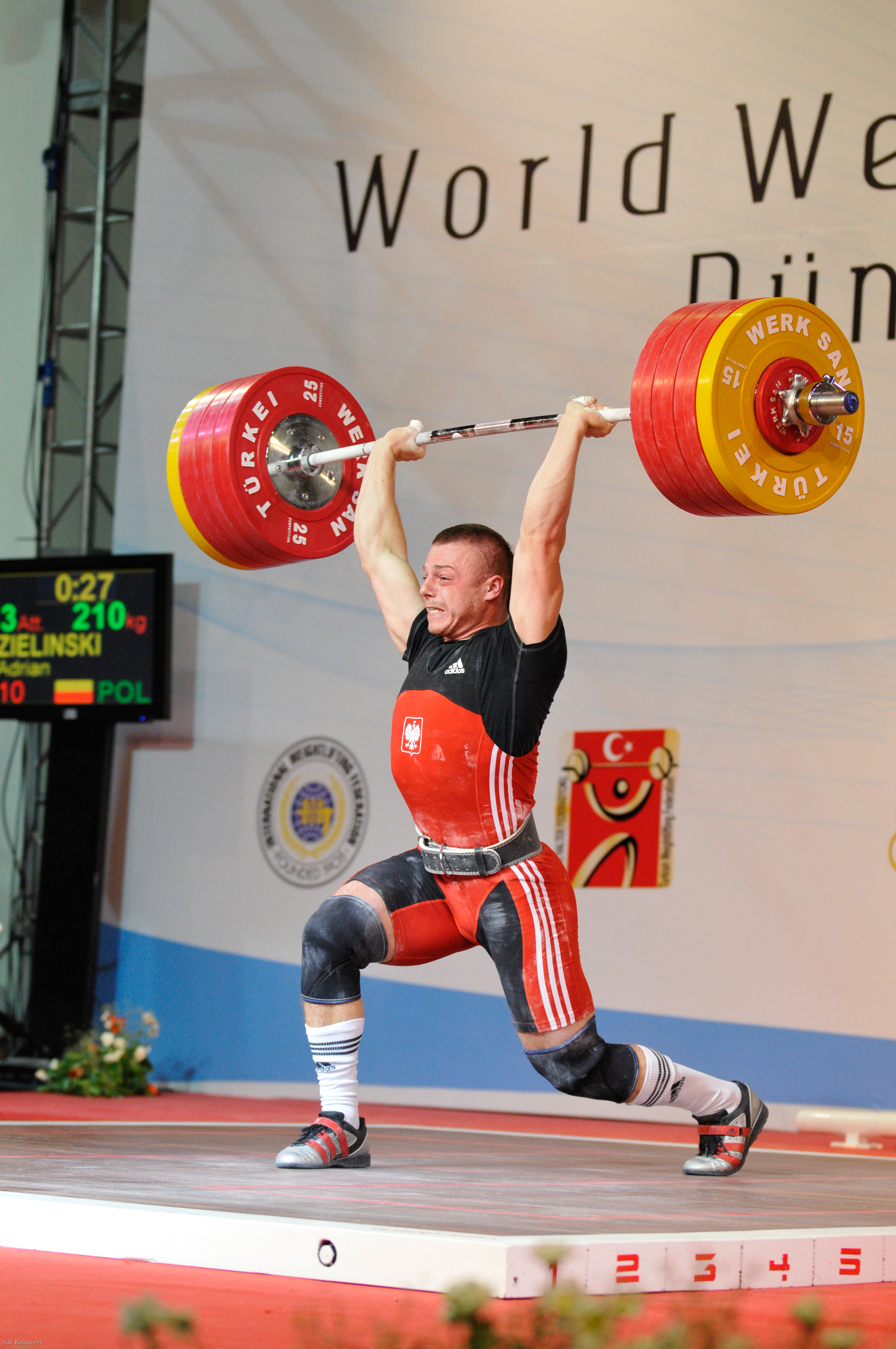

Personal information
- Full name: Adrian Edward Zieliński
- Nationality: Polish
- Born: 28 March 1989 (age 37) Nakło nad Notecią, Poland
- Education: Sports management Bydgoszcz School of Economy
- Height: 1.70 m (5 ft 7 in)
- Weight: 85 kg (187 lb)

Sport
- Country: Poland
- Sport: Olympic weightlifting
- Event: –94 kg
- Club: Zawisza Bydgoszcz
- Turned pro: 2009
- Coached by: Jerzy Śliwiński

Achievements and titles
- Olympic finals: London 2012: – 85 kg – Gold
- World finals: 2010 Antalya: – 85 kg – Gold; 2011 Paris: – 85 kg – Bronze
Medal record
Men's weightlifting
Representing Poland
Olympic Games
Gold medal – first place	2012 London	– 85 kg
World Championships
Gold medal – first place	2010 Antalya	– 85 kg
Silver medal – second place	2015 Houston	–94 kg
Bronze medal – third place	2011 Paris	– 85 kg
European Championships
Gold medal – first place	2014 Tel Aviv	– 94 kg
- Updated on 24 August 2016

Adrian Edward Zieliński (Polish pronunciation: [ˈadrjan ˈɛdvard ʑɛˈlij̃skʲi]; born 28 March 1989) is a Polish weightlifter. He is the 2012 Olympic champion in the men's 85 kg category.

== Personal life ==
Adrian Edward Zieliński was born on 28 March 1989 in Nakło nad Notecią. He is the brother of Tomasz Zieliński, who is also a weightlifter.

== Career ==
Zieliński formerly competed in the 85 kg category. He won a gold medal at the 2010 World Championships in Antalya, Turkey with a 383 kg total. He took bronze at the 2011 World Championships in Paris. At the 2012 Summer Olympics in London, he won gold with a total of 385 kg.

In 2014, Zieliński moved to the 94 kg category. He won gold at the 2014 European Championships in Tel Aviv and silver at the 2015 World Championships in Houston. He was disqualified from the 2016 Summer Olympics after an illegal substance (nandrolone) was detected in his A sample from the Polish national championships in July.
