= Mikalai Novikau =

Belarusian weightlifter

Mikalai Novikau (born 13 June 1986) is a Belarusian weightlifter competing in the 85 kg category. He finished eighth at the 2012 Summer Olympics. Novikau won a gold medal at the 2009 and 2010 European Weightlifting Championships.
