= Ulugbek Alimov =

Uzbekistani weightlifter (born 1989)

Medal record

Men's weightlifting

Representing Uzbekistan

World Championships
Bronze medal – third place	2013 Wrocław	−77 kg

Universiade
Silver medal – second place	2013 Kazan	−77 kg

Asian Championships
Gold medal – first place	2012 Pyeongtaek	−77 kg

Asian Games
Bronze medal – third place	2014 Incheon	−77 kg

Asian martial arts and indoor competitions
Silver medal – second place	2017 Ashgabat	−85 kg

Islamic Solidarity Games
Silver medal – second place	2017 Baku	85 kg

State Awards {{Honored Athlete of the Republic of Uzbekistan}}

Ulugbek Alimov (born 6 April 1989) is an Uzbekistani weightlifter. He competed at the 2013 World Championships in the Men's 77 kg, winning the bronze medal.

Alimov Ulugbek- Honored Athlete of the Republic of Uzbekistan, Master of Sports of the International Level, was born on April 6, 1989, in the Chinaz district of Tashkent region. From childhood he was engaged in physical education and sports, began to play sports in weightlifting at the Children and Youth Sports School. All the positive results achieved in sports were accepted to the Chirchik Olympic Reserve College in 2007, and this year to the national team of Uzbekistan. In addition to being the winner of the championship of the republic, he was a member of the national team of Uzbekistan at international competitions. In 2008, he took third place in the Asian Championship among youths in South Korea, second in the 2009 Asian Championships in the United Arab Emirates, third in the World Championships in 2013 and third in the Asian Championships in 2014. Thanks to his sporting achievements, a large number of children and adolescents who want to become outstanding athletes in the Republic of Uzbekistan, and not only in Tashkent, have made a significant contribution to the development of this sport in the country. At the same time, Alimov Ulugbek studied at the Chirchik College of Olympic Reserve, and the number of people wishing to enter college increased sharply.

Awards

2001 1st place championship in the Tashkent Region up to 38 kg

2002 1st place open championship of Tashkent region up to 42 kg

2003 2nd place championship in the Tashkent Region up to 42 kg

2005 year 2 place weightlifting championship among youth born in 1989–1990 to 51 kg

2007 2nd place Universiade regional final up to 69 kg

2008 3rd place Uzbekistan Cup77 kg

2008 3 place open championship of Uzbekistan up to 77 kg

2008 3rd place championship of Uzbekistan among young people born in 1988 to 77 kg

2009 2nd place Asian Championships Dubai UAE up to77 kg

2011 2nd place open championship of Uzbekistan up to 77 kg

2012 2nd place championship of Uzbekistan up to 77 kg

2012 year 2 place Asian cup & interclub weightlifting championships Mongolia Ulan Bator up to 77 kg

2012 1st place Asian Championship Korea Pyeongtaek up to 77 kg

2013 1st place open championship of the MHSK up to 77 kg

2013 1st place championship of Uzbekistan up to 77 kg

2013 3rd place weightlifting world championship Wroclaw Poland

2013 Received the title of Honored Athlete of Uzbekistan

2014 1st place Uzbekistan Cup up to 94 kg

2014 2nd place World Championship Kazakhstan Astana up to 85 kg

2017 2nd place Asian Indoor Games up to 85 kg Turkmenistan Ashgabat

2017 2nd place Asian Solidarity Games Azerbaijan Baku up to 85 kg
