= Pascal Plamondon =

Canadian weightlifter

Personal information
- Born: December 12, 1992 (age 33) Sherbrooke, Quebec
- Height: 1.78 m (5 ft 10 in)
- Weight: 85 kg (187 lb)

Sport
- Country: Canada
- Sport: Weightlifting
- Event: 85 kg
Medal record
Commonwealth Games
| Bronze medal – third place | 2014 Glasgow | 85 kg |

Pascal Plamondon (born 12 December 1992) is a weightlifter competing for Canada. He won a bronze medal in the 85 kg competition with a total lift of 333 kg at the 2014 Commonwealth Games in Glasgow.
