= Benjamin Hennequin =

French weightlifter (born 1984)

Personal information
- Full name: Benjamin Didier Hennequin
- Born: 24 August 1984 (age 42) Bordeaux, France
- Height: 1.74 m (5 ft 9 in)
- Weight: 84 kg (185 lb)

Sport
- Country: France
- Sport: Weightlifting
- Event: 85 kg
Medal record
World Championships
Silver medal – second place	2011 Paris	– 85 kg
European Championships
Bronze medal – third place	2014 Tel Aviv	85 kg
Gold medal – first place	2015 Tbilisi	85 kg

Benjamin Didier Hennequin (born 24 August 1984) is a French weightlifter who competes in the -85 kg category. At the 2011 World Championships, he won a silver medal, with a total of 378 kg. At the 2014 European Championships, he won the bronze medal, with a total of 367 kg. He competed at the 2016 Olympics.

== Biography ==
Benjamin Hennequin competed in the 2008 Olympic Games. He placed sixth in the under-85-kg weight class. In 2011, Hennequin placed third at the European Championships and then finished second at the 2011 World Weightlifting Championships in the under-85-kg weight class. He lifted a total of 378 kg.

His personal bests are 170 kg and 208 kg in the under-85-kg weight class. In the under-94-kg weight class, he holds the French record in the clean and jerk with a lift of 215 kg, set at the 2012 French Championships in Quimper. Selected for the 2012 Olympic Games in the under-85-kg category, he was eliminated without managing to lift a single weight.
