= Giovanni Bardis =

French weightlifter

Personal information
- Full name: Battista Giovanni Bardis
- Born: 21 May 1987 (age 39)
- Height: 1.77 m (5 ft 9 1/2 in)
- Weight: 85 kg (187 lb)

Sport
- Country: France
- Sport: Weightlifting
- Event: 85 kg

Battista Giovanni Bardis (born 21 May 1987) is a French weightlifter, born in Paris. His personal best is 335 kg.

At the 2007 World Weightlifting Championships he ranked 26th in the 77 kg category, with a total of 325 kg.

At the 2008 European Weightlifting Championships he ranked fifth in the 77 kg category, with a total of 335 kg.

He competed in Weightlifting at the 2008 Summer Olympics in the 77 kg division finishing fourteenth with 329 kg.

He is 177 centimetres (5 ft 10 in) tall and weighs 80 kilograms (180 lb).
