= Apti Aukhadov =

Russian weightlifter (born 1992)

Personal information
- Native name: Апти Хамзатович Аухадов
- Full name: Apti Khamzatovich Aukhadov
- Nationality: Russian
- Born: 18 November 1992 (age 33) Urus-Martan, Chechnya, Russia
- Height: 1.78 m (5 ft 10 in)
- Weight: 85 kg (187 lb)

Sport
- Country: Russia
- Sport: Olympic weightlifting
- Event: –85 kg
- Club: CSKA / MGFSO
- Coached by: Khamzat Aukhadov, Gennady Anikanov
Medal record
Olympic Games
Disqualified	2012 London	–85 kg
World Championships
Disqualified	2013 Wrocław	–85 kg
Disqualified	2015 Houston	–85 kg
European Championships
Disqualified	2013 Tirana	–85 kg
Silver medal – second place	2011 Kazan	–85 kg

Apti Khamzatovich Aukhadov (Russian: Апти Хамзатович Аухадов, born 18 November 1992) is a Russian weightlifter competing in the 85 kg category. He is a Chechen of the Bashtaroi teip.

== Career ==
Aukhadov was the world junior champion in 2010 and won silver at the 2011 European Weightlifting Championships. He initially was awarded the silver medal at the 2012 Summer Olympics in the men's 85 kg category with a total of 385 kg. Aukhadov took gold at the 2013 World Weightlifting Championships with a combined total of 387 kg.

In June 2016, it was announced by IWF that retests of the samples taken from the 2012 Olympics indicated that Aukhadov had tested positive for prohibited substances, namely Dehydrochloromethyltestosterone and Drostanolone. If confirmed, Aukhadov faced losing his Olympic medal and all results and medals earned from the date of the sample in 2012 to 2016. In October 2016, he was stripped of his Olympic medal.

In 2023 the International Weightlifting Federation annulled his results between 7 March 2012 and 7 February 2022.
