= 2013 World Weightlifting Championships =

International weightlifting competition

2013 World Championships
- Host city: Wrocław, Poland
- Dates: 20–27 October
- Main venue: Centennial Hall

The 2013 World Weightlifting Championships were held in Wrocław, Poland. The event took place from October 20 to 27, 2013.

== Medal summary ==
=== Men ===
Event	Gold		Silver		Bronze	
56 kg
Snatch	Long Qingquan; China	130 kg	Om Yun-chol; North Korea	127 kg	Thạch Kim Tuấn; Vietnam	126 kg
Clean & Jerk	Om Yun-chol; North Korea	162 kg	Long Qingquan; China	157 kg	Thạch Kim Tuấn; Vietnam	157 kg
Total	Om Yun-chol; North Korea	289 kg	Long Qingquan; China	287 kg	Thạch Kim Tuấn; Vietnam	283 kg
62 kg
Snatch	Kim Un-guk; North Korea	150 kg	Chen Lijun; China	146 kg	Óscar Figueroa; Colombia	139 kg
Clean & Jerk	Óscar Figueroa; Colombia	177 kg	Chen Lijun; China	175 kg	Kim Un-guk; North Korea	170 kg
Total	Chen Lijun; China	321 kg	Kim Un-guk; North Korea	320 kg	Óscar Figueroa; Colombia	316 kg
69 kg
Snatch	Liao Hui; China	160 kg	Oleg Chen; Russia	160 kg	Kim Myong-hyok; North Korea	152 kg
Clean & Jerk	Liao Hui; China	198 kg WR	Kim Myong-hyok; North Korea	185 kg	Liang Chenxi; China	183 kg
Total	Liao Hui; China	358 kg WR	Oleg Chen; Russia	340 kg	Kim Myong-hyok; North Korea	337 kg
77 kg
Snatch	Lü Xiaojun; China	176 kg WR	Kim Kwang-song; North Korea	163 kg	Krzysztof Zwarycz; Poland	161 kg
Clean & Jerk	Lü Xiaojun; China	204 kg	Ulugbek Alimov; Uzbekistan	197 kg	Kim Kwang-song; North Korea	196 kg
Total	Lü Xiaojun; China	380 kg WR	Kim Kwang-song; North Korea	359 kg	Ulugbek Alimov; Uzbekistan	355 kg
85 kg
Snatch	Andrei Rybakou; Belarus	179 kg	Ivan Markov; Bulgaria	175 kg	Apti Aukhadov; Russia	175 kg
Clean & Jerk	Apti Aukhadov; Russia	212 kg	Artem Okulov; Russia	209 kg	Yoelmis Hernández; Cuba	208 kg
Total	Apti Aukhadov; Russia	387 kg	Ivan Markov; Bulgaria	381 kg	Artem Okulov; Russia	381 kg
94 kg
Snatch	Aleksandr Ivanov; Russia	180 kg	Almas Uteshov; Kazakhstan	175 kg	Ragab Abdelhay; Egypt	173 kg
Clean & Jerk	Aleksandr Ivanov; Russia	222 kg	Almas Uteshov; Kazakhstan	222 kg	Vadzim Straltsou; Belarus	215 kg
Total	Aleksandr Ivanov; Russia	402 kg	Almas Uteshov; Kazakhstan	397 kg	Ramazan Rasulov; Russia	385 kg
105 kg
Snatch	Ruslan Nurudinov; Uzbekistan	190 kg	Bartłomiej Bonk; Poland	188 kg	Aleh Loban; Belarus	182 kg
Clean & Jerk	Ruslan Nurudinov; Uzbekistan	235 kg	David Bedzhanyan; Russia	225 kg	Mohammad Reza Barari; Iran	221 kg
Total	Ruslan Nurudinov; Uzbekistan	425 kg	David Bedzhanyan; Russia	405 kg	Bartłomiej Bonk; Poland	404 kg
+105 kg
Snatch	Ruslan Albegov; Russia	209 kg	Bahador Molaei; Iran	203 kg	Aleksey Lovchev; Russia	200 kg
Clean & Jerk	Bahador Molaei; Iran	255 kg	Ruslan Albegov; Russia	255 kg	Artem Udachyn; Ukraine	232 kg
Total	Ruslan Albegov; Russia	464 kg	Bahador Molaei; Iran	458 kg	Aleksey Lovchev; Russia	430 kg

=== Women ===
Event	Gold		Silver		Bronze	
48 kg
Snatch	Tan Yayun; China	84 kg	Ryang Chun-hwa; North Korea	81 kg	Marzena Karpińska; Poland	78 kg
Clean & Jerk	Tan Yayun; China	115 kg	Ryang Chun-hwa; North Korea	105 kg	Đỗ Thị Thu Hoài; Vietnam	98 kg
Total	Tan Yayun; China	199 kg	Ryang Chun-hwa; North Korea	186 kg	Đỗ Thị Thu Hoài; Vietnam	176 kg
53 kg
Snatch	Li Yajun; China	100 kg	Sopita Tanasan; Thailand	91 kg	Iulia Paratova; Ukraine	90 kg
Clean & Jerk	Li Yajun; China	121 kg	Kittima Sutanan; Thailand	114 kg	Rusmeris Villar; Colombia	112 kg
Total	Li Yajun; China	221 kg	Sopita Tanasan; Thailand	203 kg	Kittima Sutanan; Thailand	200 kg
58 kg
Snatch	Deng Wei; China	108 kg	Kuo Hsing-chun; Chinese Taipei	108 kg	Alexandra Escobar; Ecuador	103 kg
Clean & Jerk	Kuo Hsing-chun; Chinese Taipei	133 kg	Alexandra Escobar; Ecuador	122 kg	Elena Shadrina; Russia	122 kg
Total	Kuo Hsing-chun; Chinese Taipei	241 kg	Alexandra Escobar; Ecuador	225 kg	Elena Shadrina; Russia	218 kg
63 kg
Snatch	Tima Turieva; Russia	112 kg	Jo Pok-hyang; North Korea	109 kg	Deng Mengrong; China	108 kg
Clean & Jerk	Tima Turieva; Russia	140 kg	Jo Pok-hyang; North Korea	140 kg	Deng Mengrong; China	136 kg
Total	Tima Turieva; Russia	252 kg	Jo Pok-hyang; North Korea	249 kg	Deng Mengrong; China	244 kg
69 kg
Snatch	Xiang Yanmei; China	123 kg	Ryo Un-hui; North Korea	119 kg	Oxana Slivenko; Russia	118 kg
Clean & Jerk	Xiang Yanmei; China	148 kg	Dzina Sazanavets; Belarus	143 kg	Ryo Un-hui; North Korea	143 kg
Total	Xiang Yanmei; China	271 kg	Ryo Un-hui; North Korea	262 kg	Dzina Sazanavets; Belarus	259 kg
75 kg
Snatch	Kang Yue; China	126 kg	Lydia Valentín; Spain	122 kg	Nadezhda Evstyukhina; Russia	120 kg
Clean & Jerk	Nadezhda Evstyukhina; Russia	157 kg	Kang Yue; China	150 kg	Lydia Valentín; Spain	138 kg
Total	Nadezhda Evstyukhina; Russia	277 kg	Kang Yue; China	276 kg	Lydia Valentín; Spain	260 kg
+75 kg
Snatch	Zhou Lulu; China	146 kg	Tatiana Kashirina; Russia	142 kg	Chitchanok Pulsabsakul; Thailand	131 kg
Clean & Jerk	Tatiana Kashirina; Russia	190 kg WR	Zhou Lulu; China	182 kg	Chitchanok Pulsabsakul; Thailand	160 kg
Total	Tatiana Kashirina; Russia	332 kg	Zhou Lulu; China	328 kg	Chitchanok Pulsabsakul; Thailand	291 kg

== Medal table ==
Ranking by Big (Total result) medals

Rank	Nation	Gold	Silver	Bronze	Total
1	China	6	3	1	10
2	Russia	6	2	4	12
3	North Korea	1	5	1	7
4	Uzbekistan	1	0	1	2
5	Chinese Taipei	1	0	0	1
6	Thailand	0	1	2	3
7	Bulgaria	0	1	0	1
7	Ecuador	0	1	0	1
7	Iran	0	1	0	1
7	Kazakhstan	0	1	0	1
11	Vietnam	0	0	2	2
12	Belarus	0	0	1	1
12	Colombia	0	0	1	1
12	Poland	0	0	1	1
12	Spain	0	0	1	1
Totals (15 entries)		15	15	15	45

Ranking by all medals: Big (Total result) and Small (Snatch and Clean & Jerk)

Rank	Nation	Gold	Silver	Bronze	Total
1	China	20	8	4	32
2	Russia	14	7	9	30
3	North Korea	3	13	5	21
4	Uzbekistan	3	1	1	5
5	Chinese Taipei	2	1	0	3
6	Iran	1	2	1	4
7	Belarus	1	1	3	5
8	Colombia	1	0	3	4
9	Thailand	0	3	4	7
10	Kazakhstan	0	3	0	3
11	Ecuador	0	2	1	3
12	Bulgaria	0	2	0	2
13	Poland	0	1	3	4
14	Spain	0	1	2	3
15	Vietnam	0	0	5	5
16	Ukraine	0	0	2	2
17	Cuba	0	0	1	1
17	Egypt	0	0	1	1
Totals (18 entries)		45	45	45	135

== Team ranking ==
=== Men ===
Rank	Team	Points
1	Russia	589
2	China	513
3	Iran	450
4	Poland	371
5	Ecuador	343
6	North Korea	297

=== Women ===
Rank	Team	Points
1	China	505
2	Russia	441
3	Colombia	364
4	Poland	339
5	Ukraine	316
6	United States	314

== Participating nations ==
A total of 292 competitors from 55 nations participated.

- Albania (3)
- Argentina (1)
- Armenia (3)
- Azerbaijan (3)
- Belarus (10)
- Brazil (7)
- Bulgaria (5)
- Canada (7)
- China (15)
- Chinese Taipei (1)
- Colombia (15)
- Croatia (2)
- Cuba (2)
- Ecuador (15)
- Egypt (4)
- Finland (3)
- France (4)
- Germany (4)
- Great Britain (3)
- Greece (2)
- Guatemala (2)
- Hungary (3)
- India (4)
- Iran (8)
- Israel (1)
- Italy (2)
- Japan (12)
- Kazakhstan (13)
- Kyrgyzstan (1)
- Latvia (1)
- Lebanon (1)
- Lithuania (2)
- Malaysia (2)
- Mexico (8)
- Moldova (2)
- Mongolia (1)
- Netherlands (1)
- North Korea (8)
- Poland (15)
- Puerto Rico (1)
- Romania (2)
- Russia (15)
- Serbia (1)
- Seychelles (2)
- Singapore (2)
- Slovakia (2)
- Spain (6)
- Sweden (2)
- Thailand (10)
- Turkey (8)
- Ukraine (8)
- United States (15)
- Uzbekistan (8)
- Venezuela (10)
- Vietnam (4)
