= 2015 World Weightlifting Championships =

International weightlifting competition

2015 World Championships
- Host city: Houston, United States
- Dates: 19–28 November
- Main venue: George R. Brown Convention Center

The 2015 World Weightlifting Championships were held in Houston, United States. The event took place from November 19 to 28, 2015. This event was, together with the 2014 World Weightlifting Championships, the first stage of the Qualification Process for the 2016 Summer Olympics.

In September 2016 the championships won the 2016 SportsTravel Best Amateur Single-Sport Event of the Year, awarded for what SportsTravel Magazine described as "its superior organisation and spectator attendance, [and] for creating superior experience for competitors and spectators".

Despite this accolade, ESPN would later speculate that these championships may have been "the public bottoming out for weightlifting". Before the event, the International Weightlifting Federation and the United States Anti-Doping Agency had a public conflict over which entity would perform drug testing. After an agreement was reached, the USADA, according to ESPN, "aggressively target-tested athletes from teams at high risk for doping and asked hotel security and cleaning staff to report when they found syringes and vials in wastebaskets." A total of 24 samples from the competition came back positive. With the sport's doping issues now laid bare, the IWF responded by banning Russia and Bulgaria from the 2016 Olympics, and later imposed a one-year suspension on nine nations, including Russia but not Bulgaria.

== Medal summary ==
=== Men ===
Event	Gold		Silver		Bronze	
56 kg
Snatch	Wu Jingbiao; China	139 kg WR	Arli Chontey; Kazakhstan	132 kg	Om Yun-chol; North Korea	131 kg
Clean & Jerk	Om Yun-chol; North Korea	171 kg WR	Wu Jingbiao; China	163 kg	Nestor Colonia; Philippines	158 kg
Total	Om Yun-chol; North Korea	302 kg	Wu Jingbiao; China	302 kg	Thạch Kim Tuấn; Vietnam	287 kg
62 kg
Snatch	Chen Lijun; China	150 kg	Francisco Mosquera; Colombia	140 kg	Óscar Figueroa; Colombia	140 kg
Clean & Jerk	Chen Lijun; China	183 kg WR	Francisco Mosquera; Colombia	175 kg	Óscar Figueroa; Colombia	175 kg
Total	Chen Lijun; China	333 kg WR	Francisco Mosquera; Colombia	315 kg	Óscar Figueroa; Colombia	315 kg
69 kg
Snatch	Daniyar İsmayilov; Turkey	160 kg	Oleg Chen; Russia	160 kg	Shi Zhiyong; China	158 kg
Clean & Jerk	Shi Zhiyong; China	190 kg	Kim Myong-hyok; North Korea	187 kg	Bredni Roque; Mexico	186 kg
Total	Shi Zhiyong; China	348 kg	Oleg Chen; Russia	344 kg	Daniyar İsmayilov; Turkey	343 kg
77 kg
Snatch	Lü Xiaojun; China	175 kg	Andranik Karapetyan; Armenia	167 kg	Nijat Rahimov; Kazakhstan	165 kg
Clean & Jerk	Nijat Rahimov; Kazakhstan	207 kg	Mohamed Ehab; Egypt	201 kg	Andranik Karapetyan; Armenia	196 kg
Total	Nijat Rahimov; Kazakhstan	372 kg	Mohamed Ehab; Egypt	363 kg	Andranik Karapetyan; Armenia	363 kg
85 kg
Snatch	Tian Tao; China	178 kg	Artem Okulov; Russia	176 kg	Kianoush Rostami; Iran	173 kg
Clean & Jerk	Artem Okulov; Russia	215 kg	Kianoush Rostami; Iran	214 kg	Apti Aukhadov; Russia	212 kg
Total	Artem Okulov; Russia	391 kg	Kianoush Rostami; Iran	387 kg	Apti Aukhadov; Russia	380 kg
94 kg
Snatch	Aurimas Didžbalis; Lithuania	180 kg	Adrian Zieliński; Poland	177 kg	Vadzim Straltsou; Belarus	175 kg
Clean & Jerk	Vadzim Straltsou; Belarus	230 kg	Liu Hao; China	219 kg	Adrian Zieliński; Poland	214 kg
Total	Vadzim Straltsou; Belarus	405 kg	Adrian Zieliński; Poland	391 kg	Dmytro Chumak; Ukraine	386 kg
105 kg
Snatch	Ivan Efremov; Uzbekistan	192 kg	Alexandr Zaichikov; Kazakhstan	191 kg	Simon Martirosyan; Armenia	186 kg
Clean & Jerk	David Bedzhanyan; Russia	231 kg	Alexandr Zaichikov; Kazakhstan	230 kg	Sardorbek Dusmurotov; Uzbekistan	228 kg
Total	Alexandr Zaichikov; Kazakhstan	421 kg	David Bedzhanyan; Russia	411 kg	Artūrs Plēsnieks; Latvia	405 kg
+105 kg
Snatch	Lasha Talakhadze; Georgia	207 kg	Gor Minasyan; Armenia	203 kg	Irakli Turmanidze; Georgia	202 kg
Clean & Jerk	Mart Seim; Estonia	248 kg	Lasha Talakhadze; Georgia	247 kg	Ahmed Mohamed; Egypt	241 kg
Total	Lasha Talakhadze; Georgia	454 kg	Mart Seim; Estonia	438 kg	Gor Minasyan; Armenia	437 kg

=== Women ===
Event	Gold		Silver		Bronze	
48 kg
Snatch	Jiang Huihua; China	88 kg	Vương Thị Huyền; Vietnam	85 kg	Hiromi Miyake; Japan	85 kg
Clean & Jerk	Ri Song-gum; North Korea	110 kg	Jiang Huihua; China	110 kg	Vương Thị Huyền; Vietnam	109 kg
Total	Jiang Huihua; China	198 kg	Vương Thị Huyền; Vietnam	194 kg	Hiromi Miyake; Japan	193 kg
53 kg
Snatch	Chen Xiaoting; China	101 kg	Hsu Shu-ching; Chinese Taipei	96 kg	Hidilyn Diaz; Philippines	96 kg
Clean & Jerk	Hsu Shu-ching; Chinese Taipei	125 kg	Chen Xiaoting; China	120 kg	Hidilyn Diaz; Philippines	117 kg
Total	Hsu Shu-ching; Chinese Taipei	221 kg	Chen Xiaoting; China	221 kg	Hidilyn Diaz; Philippines	213 kg
58 kg
Snatch	Boyanka Kostova; Azerbaijan	112 kg WR	Deng Mengrong; China	108 kg	Sukanya Srisurat; Thailand	106 kg
Clean & Jerk	Boyanka Kostova; Azerbaijan	140 kg	Deng Mengrong; China	137 kg	Kuo Hsing-chun; Chinese Taipei	133 kg
Total	Boyanka Kostova; Azerbaijan	252 kg WR	Deng Mengrong; China	245 kg	Kuo Hsing-chun; Chinese Taipei	237 kg
63 kg
Snatch	Deng Wei; China	113 kg	Tima Turieva; Russia	112 kg	Karina Goricheva; Kazakhstan	112 kg
Clean & Jerk	Deng Wei; China	146 kg WR	Choe Hyo-sim; North Korea	139 kg	Tima Turieva; Russia	136 kg
Total	Deng Wei; China	259 kg	Tima Turieva; Russia	248 kg	Choe Hyo-sim; North Korea	243 kg
69 kg
Snatch	Xiang Yanmei; China	120 kg	Anastasia Romanova; Russia	116 kg	Zhazira Zhapparkul; Kazakhstan	116 kg
Clean & Jerk	Xiang Yanmei; China	143 kg	Zhazira Zhapparkul; Kazakhstan	140 kg	Anastasia Romanova; Russia	137 kg
Total	Xiang Yanmei; China	263 kg	Zhazira Zhapparkul; Kazakhstan	256 kg	Anastasia Romanova; Russia	253 kg
75 kg
Snatch	Kang Yue; China	127 kg	Rim Jong-sim; North Korea	125 kg	Svetlana Podobedova; Kazakhstan	121 kg
Clean & Jerk	Rim Jong-sim; North Korea	155 kg	Kang Yue; China	155 kg	Svetlana Podobedova; Kazakhstan	155 kg
Total	Kang Yue; China	282 kg	Rim Jong-sim; North Korea	280 kg	Svetlana Podobedova; Kazakhstan	276 kg
+75 kg
Snatch	Tatiana Kashirina; Russia	148 kg	Meng Suping; China	145 kg	Chitchanok Pulsabsakul; Thailand	136 kg
Clean & Jerk	Tatiana Kashirina; Russia	185 kg	Meng Suping; China	180 kg	Kim Kuk-hyang; North Korea	168 kg
Total	Tatiana Kashirina; Russia	333 kg	Meng Suping; China	325 kg	Kim Kuk-hyang; North Korea	298 kg

== Medal table ==
Ranking by Big (Total result) medals

Rank	Nation	Gold	Silver	Bronze	Total
1	China	6	4	0	10
2	Russia	2	3	2	7
3	Kazakhstan	2	1	1	4
4	North Korea	1	1	2	4
5	Chinese Taipei	1	0	1	2
6	Azerbaijan	1	0	0	1
6	Belarus	1	0	0	1
6	Georgia	1	0	0	1
9	Colombia	0	1	1	2
9	Vietnam	0	1	1	2
11	Egypt	0	1	0	1
11	Estonia	0	1	0	1
11	Iran	0	1	0	1
11	Poland	0	1	0	1
15	Armenia	0	0	2	2
16	Japan	0	0	1	1
16	Latvia	0	0	1	1
16	Philippines	0	0	1	1
16	Turkey	0	0	1	1
16	Ukraine	0	0	1	1
Totals (20 entries)		15	15	15	45

Ranking by all medals: Big (Total result) and Small (Snatch and Clean & Jerk)

Rank	Nation	Gold	Silver	Bronze	Total
1	China	19	13	1	33
2	Russia	6	7	5	18
3	North Korea	4	4	4	12
4	Kazakhstan	3	5	6	14
5	Azerbaijan	3	0	0	3
6	Chinese Taipei	2	1	2	5
7	Georgia	2	1	1	4
8	Belarus	2	0	1	3
9	Estonia	1	1	0	2
10	Turkey	1	0	1	2
10	Uzbekistan	1	0	1	2
12	Lithuania	1	0	0	1
13	Colombia	0	3	3	6
14	Armenia	0	2	4	6
15	Vietnam	0	2	2	4
16	Egypt	0	2	1	3
16	Iran	0	2	1	3
16	Poland	0	2	1	3
19	Philippines	0	0	4	4
20	Japan	0	0	2	2
20	Thailand	0	0	2	2
22	Latvia	0	0	1	1
22	Mexico	0	0	1	1
22	Ukraine	0	0	1	1
Totals (24 entries)		45	45	45	135

== Team ranking ==
=== Men ===
Rank	Team	Points
1	Russia	422
2	China	385
3	Colombia	378
6	Thailand	333
4	Belarus	320
5	Armenia	297

=== Women ===
Rank	Team	Points
1	China	558
2	Kazakhstan	431
3	Thailand	374
4	Chinese Taipei	355
5	North Korea	335
6	Russia	315

== Participating nations ==
A total of 585 competitors from 94 nations participated.

- Albania (2)
- American Samoa (1)
- Armenia (11)
- Aruba (1)
- Australia (7)
- Austria (1)
- Azerbaijan (11)
- Belarus (12)
- Belgium (2)
- Brazil (6)
- Bulgaria (4)
- Canada (10)
- Chile (3)
- China (15)
- Chinese Taipei (13)
- Colombia (14)
- Cook Islands (1)
- Costa Rica (1)
- Croatia (2)
- Cuba (7)
- Curaçao (1)
- Cyprus (2)
- Czech Republic (6)
- Denmark (5)
- Dominican Republic (7)
- Ecuador (12)
- Egypt (14)
- El Salvador (1)
- Estonia (1)
- Micronesia (1)
- Fiji (2)
- Finland (8)
- France (12)
- Georgia (9)
- Germany (10)
- Ghana (2)
- Great Britain (7)
- Greece (1)
- Guam (1)
- Hong Kong (1)
- Hungary (5)
- Iceland (5)
- India (10)
- Indonesia (13)
- Iran (7)
- Ireland (5)
- Israel (3)
- Italy (8)
- Japan (15)
- Kazakhstan (15)
- Kiribati (1)
- Kosovo (1)
- Kyrgyzstan (2)
- Latvia (2)
- Lebanon (1)
- Lithuania (7)
- Marshall Islands (2)
- Mauritius (2)
- Mexico (12)
- Moldova (9)
- Mongolia (12)
- Nauru (1)
- New Zealand (3)
- Nicaragua (2)
- Nigeria (2)
- North Korea (12)
- Norway (2)
- Palau (1)
- Papua New Guinea (3)
- Philippines (2)
- Poland (14)
- Puerto Rico (1)
- Romania (11)
- Russia (15)
- Saudi Arabia (5)
- Seychelles (1)
- Solomon Islands (1)
- South Africa (1)
- South Korea (15)
- Spain (14)
- Sri Lanka (3)
- Sweden (3)
- Switzerland (1)
- Thailand (15)
- Tunisia (6)
- Turkey (15)
- Turkmenistan (8)
- Uganda (1)
- Ukraine (13)
- United States (15)
- Uruguay (1)
- Uzbekistan (12)
- Venezuela (15)
- Vietnam (7)
