= Weightlifting at the 2020 Summer Olympics – Qualification =

This article details the qualifying phase for weightlifting at the 2020 Summer Olympics (postponed to 2021 due to the COVID-19 pandemic). The competition at these Games includes 196 athletes. Each competing nation is allowed to enter a maximum of 8 competitors, 4 men and 4 women. The IWF released its qualification list on 28 June 2021.

== Qualification system ==
For each weight class, 14 weightlifters qualify. These places are allocated as follows:

- Eight from the IWF ranking list.
- Five continental places from that ranking list, with one per continent limited to NOCs without other qualified athletes.
- One from either the host nation (six weight classes) or Tripartite Commission invitation (eight weight classes).

An NOC could only qualify one athlete per weight class, and four per sex across all weight classes.

The maximum number of athletes per NOC across all weight classes could also be limited due to anti-doping violations: if any NOC had between 10 and 19 violations from the 2008 Summer Olympics period through the end of 2020 qualifying, it was limited to two men and two women. If any NOC had 20 or more violations, it was limited to one man and one woman.

Furthermore, six nations are currently suspended by the IWF for multiple doping offenses, and thus are barred outright from the 2020 Games. Four of these suspensions have been confirmed, while two are part of ongoing appeal proceedings.

Below are a list of nations with restricted numbers as a result of high levels of historic doping offences.

Excluded outright from 2020 Summer Olympics:

- Egypt
- Malaysia
- Romania
- Thailand

Restricted to one male and one female lifter for 20 or more violations:

- ROC (40)
- Azerbaijan (34)
- Kazakhstan (34)
- Belarus (25)
- Armenia (21)
- Vietnam (20, forfeited one place)

Restricted to two male and one female lifters for 20 or more violations:

- Colombia (forfeited five places, appeal proceedings ongoing)

Restricted to two male and two female lifters for between 10 and 19 violations:

- Bulgaria (19)
- Ukraine (18)
- Uzbekistan (17)
- Turkey (15, forfeited one place)
- Moldova (14)
- India (13)
- Iran (13)
- Albania (11)
- Venezuela (11)
- Mexico (10)

Also forfeited places:

- Brazil: forfeited one place due to positive doping test.

Places earned by the ranking list (including continental places) or Tripartite Commission were awarded to the specific athlete by name. Places for the host nation were awarded to the NOC, which could allocate them among the various weight classes. If Japanese weightlifters qualified through the ranking list, the number of host nation places would decrease (that is, the host places would only be used if Japan qualified fewer than three men and three women, and only so many as needed to bring Japan up to those numbers would be used). Unused host places would be awarded through the world ranking list.

Ranking points could be earned at various weightlifting events with a multiplier based on the level of event (gold events had a 1.1 multiplier, silver 1.05, and bronze 1.0). The best results in each of the three periods were considered (1 November 2018 – 30 April 2019; 1 May 2019 – 31 October 2019; 1 November 2019 – 31 May 2021), along with the overall best result. To qualify, the weightlifter must have competed in at least one event in each of the three periods, have competed in at least six events overall, and have competed in at least one gold-level event and one other gold- or silver-level event. These restrictions were loosened for athletes using host nation quota places (who needed only one event in each period and one gold- or silver-level event) and Tripartite Commission invitation places (two events overall, including at least one gold- or silver-level).

With all sporting competitions postponed because of the COVID-19 pandemic, the International Olympic Committee approved the IWF's decision to extend its qualifying program by a year. Hence, the third phase, severely affected by the pandemic, would be split into two distinct periods with an interval between 30 April and 30 September 2020. Scores attained during the interval would not be counted towards the IWF Absolute World and Continental Rankings, respectively.

Eligible ranking events were:

- Gold – World and continental championships
- Silver – IWF events, including multi-sport games and championships
- Bronze – other international competitions

== Timeline ==
=== Gold Level ===
Event	Date	Venue
2018 World Championships	November 1–10, 2018	Ashgabat, Turkmenistan
2019 European Championships	April 6–13, 2019	(Georgia (country)) Batumi, Georgia
2019 Asian Championships	April 20–30, 2019	Ningbo, China
2019 Pan American Championships	April 23–27, 2019	Guatemala City, Guatemala
2019 African Championships	April 25–29, 2019	Cairo, Egypt
2019 Pan-American Junior Championships	May 20–28, 2019	La Habana, Cuba
2019 World Junior Championships	June 1–8, 2019	Suva, Fiji
2019 Oceania Championships	July 9–14, 2019	Apia, Samoa
2019 Oceania Junior Championships	July 9–14, 2019	Apia, Samoa
2019 World Championships	September 18–27, 2019	Pattaya, Thailand
2019 European Junior Championships	October 18–27, 2019	Bucharest, Romania
2019 Asian Junior Championships	October 20–27, 2019	Pyongyang, North Korea
2020 Asian Junior Championships	February 13–19, 2020	Tashkent, Uzbekistan
2021 European Championships	April 3–11, 2021	Moscow, Russia
2020 Asian Championships	April 16–25, 2021	Tashkent, Uzbekistan
2020 Pan American Championships	April 18–25, 2021	Santo Domingo, Dominican Republic
2021 African Championships	May 27–29, 2021	Nairobi, Kenya
2021 World Junior Championships	May 23–31, 2021	Tashkent, Uzbekistan

=== Silver Level ===
Event	Date	Venue
2019 EGAT's Cup International Championships	February 7–10, 2019	Chiang Mai, Thailand
2019 IWF World Cup	February 22–27, 2019	Fuzhou, China
2019 International Fajr Cup	March 1–5, 2019	Tehran, Iran
2019 African Zone 2 Regional Championship	March 2–7, 2019	Nairobi, Kenya
2019 IWF Grand Prix – ODESUR CSLP	May 11–12, 2019	Lima, Peru
2019 Japan-China-Korea Friendship Tournament	July 6–7, 2019	Tokyo, Japan
2019 Pan American Games	July 27–30, 2019	Lima, Peru
2019 Pacific Games	July 9–14, 2019	Apia, Samoa
2019 Mediterranean Cup	October 4–6, 2019	Serravalle, San Marino
2019 Southeast Asian Games	November 30 – December 10, 2019	Manila, Philippines

== Qualification summary ==
NOC	Men							Women							Total
NOC	61 kg	67 kg	73 kg	81 kg	96 kg	109 kg	+109 kg	49 kg	55 kg	59 kg	64 kg	76 kg	87 kg	+87 kg	Total
Albania			Yes	Yes											2
Algeria							Yes								1
American Samoa						Yes									1
Armenia						Yes				Yes					2
Australia			Yes			Yes				Yes	Yes			Yes	5
Austria							Yes							Yes	2
Belarus					Yes							Yes			2
Belgium								Yes						Yes	2
Botswana										Yes					1
Brazil								Yes					Yes		2
Bulgaria			Yes			Yes									2
Cameroon												Yes	Yes		2
Canada					Yes				Yes	Yes	Yes	Yes			5
Chile				Yes									Yes		2
China	Yes	Yes	Yes	Yes				Yes	Yes				Yes	Yes	8
Colombia		Yes		Yes							Yes				3
Cuba					Yes			Yes			Yes			Yes	4
Czech Republic							Yes								1
Dominican Republic	Yes			Yes				Yes					Yes	Yes	5
Ecuador										Yes	Yes	Yes	Yes		4
France		Yes						Yes		Yes			Yes		4
Georgia	Yes	Yes			Yes		Yes								4
Germany	Yes			Yes						Yes	Yes				4
Ghana					Yes										1
Great Britain										Yes	Yes	Yes		Yes	4
Greece					Yes										1
Guatemala														Yes	1
Hungary							Yes								1
India								Yes							1
Indonesia	Yes	Yes	Yes					Yes						Yes	5
Iran						Yes	Yes								2
Israel							Yes								1
Italy	Yes	Yes		Yes						Yes	Yes				5
Japan	Yes	Yes	Yes		Yes			Yes	Yes	Yes					7
Kazakhstan	Yes								Yes						2
Kiribati		Yes													1
Kyrgyzstan					Yes										1
Latvia				Yes		Yes									2
Lebanon												Yes			1
Lithuania						Yes									1
Madagascar	Yes	Yes													2
Malta											Yes				1
Mauritius								Yes							1
Mexico		Yes	Yes						Yes			Yes			4
Moldova													Yes		1
Mongolia													Yes	Yes	2
Morocco			Yes												1
Nauru												Yes			1
Netherlands							Yes								1
New Zealand				Yes			Yes					Yes	Yes	Yes	5
Nicaragua											Yes				1
Oman				Yes											1
Pakistan		Yes													1
Palestine					Yes										1
Papua New Guinea	Yes							Yes							2
Peru	Yes														1
Philippines									Yes		Yes				2
Poland					Yes	Yes			Yes						3
Qatar					Yes										1
Refugee Olympic Team					Yes										1
ROC						Yes		Yes							2
Saudi Arabia			Yes												1
Solomon Islands									Yes						1
South Korea		Yes	Yes		Yes	Yes			Yes			Yes	Yes	Yes	8
Spain			Yes	Yes			Yes						Yes		4
Sweden												Yes			1
Syria							Yes								1
Chinese Taipei	Yes				Yes		Yes	Yes	Yes	Yes	Yes				7
Tonga														Yes	1
Tunisia			Yes	Yes		Yes			Yes		Yes				5
Turkey	Yes	Yes									Yes				3
Turkmenistan				Yes		Yes	Yes		Yes	Yes					5
Ukraine									Yes			Yes			2
United States			Yes	Yes		Yes	Yes	Yes				Yes	Yes	Yes	8
Uzbekistan		Yes				Yes			Yes			Yes			4
Venezuela			Yes		Yes					Yes			Yes		4
Vietnam	Yes									Yes					2
Total: 77 NOCs	14	14	14	14	15	14	14	14	14	14	14	14	14	14	197

== Men's events ==
=== 61 kg ===
Section	Places	NOC	Qualified weightlifter
IWF Absolute World Ranking	8	China	Li Fabin
IWF Absolute World Ranking	8	Indonesia	Eko Yuli Irawan
IWF Absolute World Ranking	8	Vietnam	Thạch Kim Tuấn
IWF Absolute World Ranking	8	Japan	Yoichi Itokazu
IWF Absolute World Ranking	8	Georgia	Shota Mishvelidze
IWF Absolute World Ranking	8	Germany	Simon Brandhuber
IWF Absolute World Ranking	8	Saudi Arabia	Seraj Al-Saleem
IWF Absolute World Ranking	8	Kazakhstan	Igor Son
IWF Absolute Continental Ranking – Africa	1	Madagascar	Eric Andriantsitohaina
IWF Absolute Continental Ranking – Americas	1	Dominican Republic	Luis García
IWF Absolute Continental Ranking – Asia	1	Chinese Taipei	Kao Chan-hung
IWF Absolute Continental Ranking – Europe	1	Italy	Davide Ruiu
IWF Absolute Continental Ranking – Oceania	1	Papua New Guinea	Morea Baru
Rellocation of Tripartite Commission Invitation	1	Peru	Marcos Rojas
Total	14		

=== 67 kg ===
Section	Places	NOC	Qualified weightlifter
IWF Absolute World Ranking	8	China	Chen Lijun
IWF Absolute World Ranking	8	Uzbekistan	Adkhamjon Ergashev
IWF Absolute World Ranking	8	Colombia	Luis Javier Mosquera
IWF Absolute World Ranking	8	Turkey	Muhammed Furkan Özbek
IWF Absolute World Ranking	8	Italy	Mirko Zanni
IWF Absolute World Ranking	8	Japan	Mitsunori Konnai
IWF Absolute World Ranking	8	France	Bernardin Kingue Matam
IWF Absolute World Ranking	8	Indonesia	Deni
IWF Absolute Continental Ranking – Africa	1	Madagascar	Tojonirina Andriantsitohaina
IWF Absolute Continental Ranking – Americas	1	Mexico	Jonathan Muñoz
IWF Absolute Continental Ranking – Asia	1	South Korea	Han Myeong-mok
IWF Absolute Continental Ranking – Europe	1	Georgia	Goga Chkheidze
IWF Absolute Continental Ranking – Oceania	1	Kiribati	Ruben Katoatau
Tripartite Commission Invitation	1	Pakistan	Talha Talib
Total	14		

=== 73 kg ===
Section	Places	NOC	Qualified weightlifter
IWF Absolute World Ranking	8	China	Shi Zhiyong
IWF Absolute World Ranking	8	United States	Clarence Cummings
IWF Absolute World Ranking	8	Bulgaria	Bozhidar Andreev
IWF Absolute World Ranking	8	Venezuela	Julio Mayora
IWF Absolute World Ranking	8	Albania	Briken Calja
IWF Absolute World Ranking	8	Tunisia	Karem Ben Hnia
IWF Absolute World Ranking	8	Japan	Masanori Miyamoto
IWF Absolute World Ranking	8	Moldova	Marin Robu
IWF Absolute Continental Ranking – Africa	1	Morocco	Abderrahim Moum
IWF Absolute Continental Ranking – Americas	1	Mexico	Jorge Cárdenas
IWF Absolute Continental Ranking – Asia	1	Indonesia	Rahmat Erwin Abdullah
IWF Absolute Continental Ranking – Europe	1	Spain	David Sánchez
IWF Absolute Continental Ranking – Oceania	1	Australia	Brandon Wakeling
Reallocation of Tripartite Commission Invitation	1	Saudi Arabia	Mahmoud Al-Humayd
Total	14		

=== 81 kg ===
Section	Places	NOC	Qualified weightlifter
IWF Absolute World Ranking	8	China	Lü Xiaojun
IWF Absolute World Ranking	8	Colombia	Brayan Rodallegas
IWF Absolute World Ranking	8	Italy	Antonino Pizzolato
IWF Absolute World Ranking	8	Dominican Republic	Zacarías Bonnat
IWF Absolute World Ranking	8	Turkmenistan	Rejepbaý Rejepow
IWF Absolute World Ranking	8	United States	Harrison Maurus
IWF Absolute World Ranking	8	Latvia	Ritvars Suharevs
IWF Absolute World Ranking	8	Germany	Nico Müller
IWF Absolute Continental Ranking – Africa	1	Tunisia	Ramzi Bahloul
IWF Absolute Continental Ranking – Americas	1	Chile	Arley Méndez
IWF Absolute Continental Ranking – Asia	1	—	—
IWF Absolute Continental Ranking – Europe	1	Spain	Andrés Mata
IWF Absolute Continental Ranking – Oceania	1	New Zealand	Cameron McTaggart
Tripartite Commission Invitation	1	Oman	Amur Salim Al-Khanjari
Re-allocation of unused quota place	1	Albania	Erkand Qerimaj
Total	14		

=== 96 kg ===
Section	Places	NOC	Qualified weightlifter
IWF Absolute World Ranking	8	Qatar	Fares Ibrahim
IWF Absolute World Ranking	8	Belarus	Yauheni Tsikhantsou
IWF Absolute World Ranking	8	Georgia	Anton Pliesnoi
IWF Absolute World Ranking	8	Canada	Boady Santavy
IWF Absolute World Ranking	8	South Korea	Yu Dong-ju
IWF Absolute World Ranking	8	Venezuela	Keydomar Vallenilla
IWF Absolute World Ranking	8	Japan	Toshiki Yamamoto
IWF Absolute World Ranking	8	Greece	Theodoros Iakovidis
IWF Absolute Continental Ranking – Africa	1	Ghana	Christian Amoah
IWF Absolute Continental Ranking – Americas	1	Cuba	Olfides Sáez
IWF Absolute Continental Ranking – Asia	1	Kyrgyzstan	Bekdoolot Rasulbekov
IWF Absolute Continental Ranking – Europe	1	Poland	Bartłomiej Adamus
IWF Absolute Continental Ranking – Oceania	—	—	—
Tripartite Commission Invitation	1	Palestine	Mohammed Hamada
IOC Invitation	1	Refugee Olympic Team	Cyrille Tchatchet II
Re-allocation of unused quota place	1	Chinese Taipei	Chen Po-jen
Total	15		

=== 109 kg ===
Section	Places	NOC	Qualified weightlifter
IWF Absolute World Ranking	8	Armenia	Simon Martirosyan
IWF Absolute World Ranking	8	Uzbekistan	Akbar Djuraev
IWF Absolute World Ranking	8	ROC	Timur Naniev
IWF Absolute World Ranking	8	Iran	Ali Hashemi
IWF Absolute World Ranking	8	Poland	Arkadiusz Michalski
IWF Absolute World Ranking	8	Latvia	Artūrs Plēsnieks
IWF Absolute World Ranking	8	Bulgaria	Hristo Hristov
IWF Absolute World Ranking	8	South Korea	Jin Yun-seong
IWF Absolute Continental Ranking – Africa	1	Tunisia	Aymen Bacha
IWF Absolute Continental Ranking – Americas	1	United States	Wesley Kitts
IWF Absolute Continental Ranking – Asia	1	Turkmenistan	Öwez Öwezow
IWF Absolute Continental Ranking – Europe	1	—	—
IWF Absolute Continental Ranking – Oceania	1	Australia	Matthew Lydement
Tripartite Commission Invitation	1	American Samoa	Tanumafili Jungblut
Re-allocation of unused quota place	1	Lithuania	Arnas Šidiškis
Total	14		

=== +109 kg ===
Section	Places	NOC	Qualified weightlifter
IWF Absolute World Ranking	8	Georgia	Lasha Talakhadze
IWF Absolute World Ranking	8	Iran	Ali Davoudi
IWF Absolute World Ranking	8	Syria	Man Asaad
IWF Absolute World Ranking	8	Turkmenistan	Hojamuhammet Toýçyýew
IWF Absolute World Ranking	8	Algeria	Walid Bidani
IWF Absolute World Ranking	8	Spain	Marcos Ruiz
IWF Absolute World Ranking	8	Austria	Sargis Martirosjan
IWF Absolute World Ranking	8	Israel	David Litvinov
IWF Absolute Continental Ranking – Africa	1	—	—
IWF Absolute Continental Ranking – Americas	1	United States	Caine Wilkes
IWF Absolute Continental Ranking – Asia	1	Chinese Taipei	Hsieh Yun-ting
IWF Absolute Continental Ranking – Europe	1	Czech Republic	Jiří Orság
IWF Absolute Continental Ranking – Oceania	1	New Zealand	David Liti
Re-allocation of Tripartite Commission Invitation	1	Netherlands	Enzo Kuworge
Re-allocation of unused quota place	1	Hungary	Péter Nagy
Total	14		

== Women's events ==
=== 49 kg ===
Section	Places	NOC	Qualified weightlifter
IWF Absolute World Ranking	8	China	Hou Zhihui
IWF Absolute World Ranking	8	India	Saikhom Mirabai Chanu
IWF Absolute World Ranking	8	United States	Jourdan Delacruz
IWF Absolute World Ranking	8	Dominican Republic	Beatriz Pirón
IWF Absolute World Ranking	8	Indonesia	Windy Cantika Aisah
IWF Absolute World Ranking	8	ROC	Kristina Sobol
IWF Absolute World Ranking	8	Brazil	Natasha Rosa Figueiredo
IWF Absolute World Ranking	8	Belgium	Nina Sterckx
IWF Absolute Continental Ranking – Africa	1	Mauritius	Roilya Ranaivosoa
IWF Absolute Continental Ranking – Americas	1	Cuba	Ludia Montero
IWF Absolute Continental Ranking – Asia	1	Chinese Taipei	Fang Wan-ling
IWF Absolute Continental Ranking – Europe	1	France	Anaïs Michel
IWF Absolute Continental Ranking – Oceania	1	Papua New Guinea	Dika Toua
Host nation	1	Japan	Hiromi Miyake
Total	14		

=== 55 kg ===
Section	Places	NOC	Qualified weightlifter
IWF Absolute World Ranking	8	China	Liao Qiuyun
IWF Absolute World Ranking	8	Philippines	Hidilyn Diaz
IWF Absolute World Ranking	8	Uzbekistan	Muattar Nabieva
IWF Absolute World Ranking	8	Kazakhstan	Zulfiya Chinshanlo
IWF Absolute World Ranking	8	Mexico	Ana Gabriela López
IWF Absolute World Ranking	8	Turkmenistan	Kristina Şermetowa
IWF Absolute World Ranking	8	Ukraine	Kamila Konotop
IWF Absolute World Ranking	8	South Korea	Ham Eun-ji
IWF Absolute Continental Ranking – Africa	1	Tunisia	Nouha Landoulsi
IWF Absolute Continental Ranking – Americas	1	Canada	Rachel Leblanc-Bazinet
IWF Absolute Continental Ranking – Asia	1	Chinese Taipei	Chiang Nien-hsin
IWF Absolute Continental Ranking – Europe	1	Poland	Joanna Łochowska
IWF Absolute Continental Ranking – Oceania	1	Solomon Islands	Mary Kini Lifu
Host nation	1	Japan	Kanae Yagi
Total	14		

=== 59 kg ===
Section	Places	NOC	Qualified weightlifter
IWF Absolute World Ranking	8	Chinese Taipei	Kuo Hsing-chun
IWF Absolute World Ranking	8	Ecuador	Alexandra Escobar
IWF Absolute World Ranking	8	Vietnam	Hoàng Thị Duyên
IWF Absolute World Ranking	8	Venezuela	Yusleidy Figueroa
IWF Absolute World Ranking	8	Great Britain	Zoe Smith
IWF Absolute World Ranking	8	France	Dora Tchakounté
IWF Absolute World Ranking	8	Armenia	Izabella Yaylyan
IWF Absolute World Ranking	8	Italy	Maria Grazia Alemanno
IWF Absolute Continental Ranking – Africa	1	Botswana	Magdeline Moyengwa
IWF Absolute Continental Ranking – Americas	1	Canada	Tali Darsigny
IWF Absolute Continental Ranking – Asia	1	Turkmenistan	Polina Gurýewa
IWF Absolute Continental Ranking – Europe	1	Germany	Sabine Kusterer
IWF Absolute Continental Ranking – Oceania	1	Australia	Erika Yamasaki
Host nation	1	Japan	Mikiko Andoh
Total	14		

=== 64 kg ===
Section	Places	NOC	Qualified weightlifter
IWF Absolute World Ranking	8	Colombia	Mercedes Pérez
IWF Absolute World Ranking	8	Canada	Maude Charron
IWF Absolute World Ranking	8	Ecuador	Angie Palacios
IWF Absolute World Ranking	8	Great Britain	Sarah Davies
IWF Absolute World Ranking	8	Italy	Giorgia Bordignon
IWF Absolute World Ranking	8	Chinese Taipei	Chen Wen-huei
IWF Absolute World Ranking	8	Cuba	Marina Rodríguez
IWF Absolute World Ranking	8	Germany	Lisa Schweizer
IWF Absolute Continental Ranking – Africa	1	Tunisia	Chaima Rahmouni
IWF Absolute Continental Ranking – Americas	1	Nicaragua	Sema Ludrick
IWF Absolute Continental Ranking – Asia	1	Philippines	Elreen Ando
IWF Absolute Continental Ranking – Europe	1	Turkey	Nuray Levent
IWF Absolute Continental Ranking – Oceania	1	Australia	Kiana Elliott
Tripartite Commission Invitation	1	Malta	Yasmin Zammit Stevens
Total	14		

=== 76 kg ===
Section	Places	NOC	Qualified weightlifter
IWF Absolute World Ranking	8	Ecuador	Neisi Dájomes
IWF Absolute World Ranking	8	United States	Katherine Nye
IWF Absolute World Ranking	8	Mexico	Aremi Fuentes
IWF Absolute World Ranking	8	South Korea	Kim Su-hyeon
IWF Absolute World Ranking	8	Uzbekistan	Kumushkhon Fayzullaeva
IWF Absolute World Ranking	8	Ukraine	Iryna Dekha
IWF Absolute World Ranking	8	Belarus	Darya Naumava
IWF Absolute World Ranking	8	Great Britain	Emily Muskett
IWF Absolute Continental Ranking – Africa	1	Cameroon	Jeanne Gaëlle Eyenga
IWF Absolute Continental Ranking – Americas	1	Canada	Kristel Ngarlem
IWF Absolute Continental Ranking – Asia	1	Lebanon	Mahassen Fattouh
IWF Absolute Continental Ranking – Europe	1	Sweden	Patricia Strenius
IWF Absolute Continental Ranking – Oceania	1	New Zealand	Megan Signal
Tripartite Commission Invitation	1	Nauru	Nancy Genzel Abouke
Total	14		

=== 87 kg ===
Section	Places	NOC	Qualified weightlifter
IWF Absolute World Ranking	8	China	Wang Zhouyu
IWF Absolute World Ranking	8	United States	Mattie Rogers
IWF Absolute World Ranking	8	Spain	Lydia Valentín
IWF Absolute World Ranking	8	Dominican Republic	Crismery Santana
IWF Absolute World Ranking	8	Ecuador	Tamara Salazar
IWF Absolute World Ranking	8	Chile	María Fernanda Valdés
IWF Absolute World Ranking	8	Venezuela	Naryury Pérez
IWF Absolute World Ranking	8	Mongolia	Mönkhjantsangiin Ankhtsetseg
IWF Absolute Continental Ranking – Africa	1	Cameroon	Clementine Meukeugni
IWF Absolute Continental Ranking – Americas	1	Brazil	Jaqueline Ferreira
IWF Absolute Continental Ranking – Asia	1	South Korea	Kang Yeoun-hee
IWF Absolute Continental Ranking – Europe	1	France	Gaëlle Nayo-Ketchanke
IWF Absolute Continental Ranking – Oceania	1	New Zealand	Kanah Andrews-Nahu
Re-allocation of unused Tripartite Commission Invitation	1	Moldova	Elena Cîlcic
Total	14		

=== +87 kg ===
Section	Places	NOC	Qualified weightlifter
IWF Absolute World Ranking	8	China	Li Wenwen
IWF Absolute World Ranking	8	United States	Sarah Robles
IWF Absolute World Ranking	8	South Korea	Lee Seon-mi
IWF Absolute World Ranking	8	Dominican Republic	Verónica Saladín
IWF Absolute World Ranking	8	Great Britain	Emily Campbell
IWF Absolute World Ranking	8	Indonesia	Nurul Akmal
IWF Absolute World Ranking	8	New Zealand	Laurel Hubbard
IWF Absolute World Ranking	8	Australia	Charisma Amoe-Tarrant
IWF Absolute Continental Ranking – Africa	1	—	—
IWF Absolute Continental Ranking – Americas	1	Cuba	Eyurkenia Duverger
IWF Absolute Continental Ranking – Asia	1	Mongolia	Erdenebatyn Bilegsaikhan
IWF Absolute Continental Ranking – Europe	1	Belgium	Anna Van Bellinghen
IWF Absolute Continental Ranking – Oceania	—	—	—
Tripartite Commission Invitation	1	Tonga	Kuinini Manumua
Re-allocation of unused quota place	2	Austria	Sarah Fischer
Re-allocation of unused quota place	2	Guatemala	Scarleth Ucelo
Total	14		
