= List of Chilean records in Olympic weightlifting =

The following are the national records in Olympic weightlifting in Chile. Records are maintained in each weight class for the snatch lift, clean and jerk lift, and the total for both lifts by the Federacion Chilena Levantamiento de Pesas (FECHIPE).

== Current records ==
=== Men ===
Event	Record	Athlete	Date	Meet	Place	Ref
60 kg
Snatch	117 kg	Standard				
Clean & Jerk	146 kg	Standard				
Total	262 kg	Standard				
65 kg
Snatch	125 kg	Standard				
Clean & Jerk	149 kg	Standard				
Total	272 kg	Standard				
71 kg
Snatch	136 kg	Standard				
Clean & Jerk	167 kg	Standard				
Total	302 kg	Standard				
79 kg
Snatch	160 kg	Standard				
Clean & Jerk	186 kg	Standard				
Total	345 kg	Standard				
88 kg
Snatch	172 kg	Arley Méndez	7 October 2025	World Championships	Førde, Norway	
Clean & Jerk	206 kg	Standard				
Total	376 kg	Standard				
94 kg
Snatch	173 kg	Standard				
Clean & Jerk	208 kg	Standard				
Total	378 kg	Standard				
110 kg
Snatch	158 kg	Standard				
Clean & Jerk	191 kg	Standard				
Total	340 kg	Standard				
+110 kg
Snatch	169 kg	Standard				
Clean & Jerk	210 kg	Alonso Bizama	30 April 2026	Pan American Championships	Panama City, Panama	
Total	376 kg	Alonso Bizama	30 April 2026	Pan American Championships	Panama City, Panama	

=== Women ===
Event	Record	Athlete	Date	Meet	Place	Ref
48 kg
Snatch	74 kg	Standard				
Clean & Jerk	95 kg	Li Joo	13 July 2025	Pan American Championships	Cali, Colombia	
Total	166 kg	Standard				
53 kg
Snatch	80 kg	Standard				
Clean & Jerk	100 kg	Standard				
Total	178 kg	Standard				
58 kg
Snatch	84 kg	Standard				
Clean & Jerk	106 kg	Standard				
Total	187 kg	Standard				
63 kg
Snatch	90 kg	Standard				
Clean & Jerk	111 kg	Standard				
Total	197 kg	Standard				
69 kg
Snatch	95 kg	Standard				
Clean & Jerk	119 kg	Standard				
Total	210 kg	Standard				
77 kg
Snatch	99 kg	Standard				
Clean & Jerk	123 kg	Standard				
Total	219 kg	Standard				
86 kg
Snatch	113 kg	Standard				
Clean & Jerk	148 kg	Standard				
Total	260 kg	Standard				
+86 kg
Snatch	115 kg	Standard				
Clean & Jerk	143 kg	Standard				
Total	257 kg	Standard				

== Historical records ==
=== Men (2018–2025) ===
Event	Record	Athlete	Date	Meet	Place	Ref
55 kg
Snatch	108 kg	Standard				
Clean & Jerk	129 kg	Standard				
Total	234 kg	Standard				
61 kg
Snatch	116 kg	Aldair Castro	31 August 2023		La Serena, Chile	
Clean & Jerk	145 kg	Aldair Castro	31 August 2023		La Serena, Chile	
Total	261 kg	Aldair Castro	31 August 2023		La Serena, Chile	
67 kg
Snatch	124 kg	Sergio Cares	29 April 2022		Santiago, Chile	
Clean & Jerk	148 kg	Aldair Castro	18 December 2022		Temuco, Chile	
Total	271 kg	Sergio Cares	29 April 2022		Santiago, Chile	
73 kg
Snatch	135 kg	Sergio Cares	8 September 2023	World Championships	Riyadh, Saudi Arabia	
Clean & Jerk	166 kg	Sergio Cares	8 September 2023	World Championships	Riyadh, Saudi Arabia	
Total	301 kg	Sergio Cares	8 September 2023	World Championships	Riyadh, Saudi Arabia	
81 kg
Snatch	159 kg	Arley Méndez	8 November 2019		Lima, Peru	
Snatch	160 kg	Arley Méndez	31 July 2021	Olympic Games	Tokyo, Japan	
Clean & Jerk	185 kg	Arley Méndez	8 November 2019		Lima, Peru	
Total	344 kg	Arley Méndez	8 November 2019		Lima, Peru	
89 kg
Snatch	170 kg	Arley Méndez	25 April 2019	Pan American Championships	Guatemala City, Guatemala	
Clean & Jerk	205 kg	Arley Méndez	25 April 2019	Pan American Championships	Guatemala City, Guatemala	
Total	375 kg	Arley Méndez	25 April 2019	Pan American Championships	Guatemala City, Guatemala	
96 kg
Snatch	172 kg	Arley Méndez	23 February 2019	Chilean Championships	Santiago, Chile	
Clean & Jerk	207 kg	Arley Méndez	9 March 2019	Las Vegas International Open	Las Vegas, United States	
Total	377 kg	Arley Méndez	23 February 2019	Chilean Championships	Santiago, Chile	
102 kg
Snatch	156 kg	Nicolás Cuevas	7 June 2024		Santiago, Chile	
Clean & Jerk	189 kg	Nicolás Cuevas	7 June 2024		Santiago, Chile	
Total	342 kg (Note: probably a typo)	Nicolás Cuevas	7 June 2024		Santiago, Chile	
109 kg
Snatch	157 kg	Standard				
Clean & Jerk	190 kg	Standard				
Total	339 kg	Standard				
+109 kg
Snatch	168 kg	Standard				
Clean & Jerk	203 kg	Alonso Bizama	29 November 2024	Bolivarian Games	Ayacucho, Peru	
Total	363 kg	Alonso Bizama	29 November 2024	Bolivarian Games	Ayacucho, Peru	

=== Men (1998–2018) ===
Event	Record	Athlete	Date	Meet	Place	Ref
-56 kg
Snatch	111 kg	Jaime Iturra	14 July 2007	Pan American Games	Rio de Janeiro, Brazil	
Clean & Jerk	138 kg	Francisco Barrera	24 June 2013		Cienfuegos, Cuba	
Total	246 kg	Jaime Iturra	14 July 2007	Pan American Games	Rio de Janeiro, Brazil	
-62 kg
Snatch	121 kg	Jaime Iturra	22 August 2008		La Serena, Chile	
Clean & Jerk	150 kg	Jaime Iturra	22 August 2008		La Serena, Chile	
Total	271 kg	Jaime Iturra	22 August 2008		La Serena, Chile	
-69 kg
Snatch	125 kg	Eduardo Soto	8 April 2016		Rio de Janeiro, Brazil	
Clean & Jerk	153 kg	Yethzari Bustamante	27 March 2010		Medellín, Colombia	
Total	273 kg	Alejandro Guanteo	24 July 2017	Pan American Championships	Miami, United States	
-77 kg
Snatch	144 kg	Bastián López	16 May 2018	Pan American Championships	Santo Domingo, Dominican Republic	
Clean & Jerk	178 kg	Bastián López	6 March 2016		Santiago, Chile	
Total	319 kg	Bastián López	8 April 2016		Rio de Janeiro, Brazil	
-85 kg
Snatch	175 kg	Arley Méndez	3 December 2017	World Championships	Anaheim, United States	
Clean & Jerk	212 kg	Arley Méndez	30 May 2018	South American Games	Cochabamba, Bolivia	
Total	382 kg	Arley Méndez	20 November 2017	South American Championships	Santa Marta, Colombia	
-94 kg
Snatch	165 kg	Arley Méndez	12 August 2017		Punta Arenas, Chile	
Clean & Jerk	190 kg	Arley Méndez	12 August 2017		Punta Arenas, Chile	
Total	355 kg	Arley Méndez	12 August 2017		Punta Arenas, Chile	
-105 kg
Snatch	160 kg	Cristián Escalante	19 December 1998		Concepción, Chile	
Clean & Jerk	200 kg	Cristián Escalante	24 July 1999		Concepción, Chile	
Total	357.5 kg	Cristián Escalante	24 July 1999		Concepción, Chile	
+105 kg
Snatch	180 kg	Cristián Escalante	18 July 2007	Pan American Games	Rio de Janeiro, Brazil	
Clean & Jerk	221 kg	Cristián Escalante	18 July 2007	Pan American Games	Rio de Janeiro, Brazil	
Total	401 kg	Cristián Escalante	18 July 2007	Pan American Games	Rio de Janeiro, Brazil	

=== Women (2018–2025) ===
Event	Record	Athlete	Date	Meet	Place	Ref
45 kg
Snatch	68 kg	Standard				
Clean & Jerk	86 kg	Standard				
Total	153 kg	Standard				
49 kg
Snatch	73 kg	Macarena García	15 October 2024		Valparaiso, Chile	
Clean & Jerk	93 kg	Katherine Landeros	5 July 2023		Guayaquil, Ecuador	
Total	165 kg	Li Joo Hu	14 November 2024	Chilean Championships	Machalí, Chile	
55 kg
Snatch	79 kg	Standard				
Clean & Jerk	99 kg	Standard				
Total	177 kg	Standard				
59 kg
Snatch	83 kg	Standard				
Clean & Jerk	105 kg	Standard				
Total	186 kg	Standard				
64 kg
Snatch	89 kg	Constanza Celis	7 December 2024		Santiago, Chile	
Clean & Jerk	110 kg	Standard				
Total	196 kg	Standard				
71 kg
Snatch	94 kg	Standard				
Clean & Jerk	118 kg	Standard				
Total	209 kg	Standard				
76 kg
Snatch	98 kg	Standard				
Clean & Jerk	122 kg	Standard				
Total	218 kg	Standard				
81 kg
Snatch	102 kg	Standard				
Clean & Jerk	126 kg	Standard				
Total	226 kg	Standard				
87 kg
Snatch	112 kg	María Fernanda Valdés	30 July 2019	Pan American Games	Lima, Peru	
Clean & Jerk	147 kg	María Fernanda Valdés	30 July 2019	Pan American Games	Lima, Peru	
Total	259 kg	María Fernanda Valdés	30 July 2019	Pan American Games	Lima, Peru	
+87 kg
Snatch	114 kg	Standard				
Clean & Jerk	142 kg	Standard				
Total	256 kg	Standard				

=== Women (1998–2018) ===
Event	Record	Athlete	Date	Meet	Place	Ref
48 kg
Snatch						
Clean & Jerk	95 kg	Gabriela Vera	12 March 2012	XXXI Manuel Suarez Memorial	Matanzas, Cuba	
Total						
53 kg
Snatch						
Clean & Jerk						
Total						
58 kg
Snatch						
Clean & Jerk						
Total						
63 kg
Snatch						
Clean & Jerk						
Total						
69 kg
Snatch						
Clean & Jerk						
Total						
75 kg
Snatch						
Clean & Jerk						
Total						
90 kg
Snatch	111 kg	María Valdés	27 July 2017	Pan American Championships	Miami, United States	
Clean & Jerk	146 kg	María Valdés	4 December 2017	World Championships	Anaheim, United States	
Total	255 kg	María Valdés	4 December 2017	World Championships	Anaheim, United States	
+90 kg
Snatch						
Clean & Jerk						
Total						
