= 2019 World Weightlifting Championships – Men's 81 kg =

The men's 81 kg competition at the 2019 World Weightlifting Championships was held on 21 and 22 September 2019.

== Schedule ==
Date	Time	Event
21 September 2019	08:00	Group D
22 September 2019	10:00	Group C
22 September 2019	14:25	Group B
22 September 2019	17:55	Group A

== Medalists ==
Event	Gold		Silver		Bronze	
Snatch	Lü Xiaojun (CHN)	171 kg	Li Dayin (CHN)	171 kg	Andranik Karapetyan (ARM)	168 kg
Clean & Jerk	Lü Xiaojun (CHN)	207 kg	Li Dayin (CHN)	206 kg	Yunder Beytula (BUL)	201 kg
Total	Lü Xiaojun (CHN)	378 kg	Li Dayin (CHN)	377 kg	Brayan Rodallegas (COL)	363 kg

== Records ==
Prior to this competition, the existing world records were as follows. Prior to this competition, the existing world records were as follows.

World Record	Snatch	Mohamed Ehab (EGY)	173 kg	Ashgabat, Turkmenistan	5 November 2018
World Record	Clean & Jerk	World Standard	206 kg	—	1 November 2018
World Record	Total	Li Dayin (CHN)	375 kg	Fuzhou, China	24 February 2019

== Results ==
Rank	Athlete	Group	Snatch (kg)				Clean & Jerk (kg)				Total
Rank	Athlete	Group	1	2	3	Rank	1	2	3	Rank	Total
1st place, gold medalist(s)	Lü Xiaojun (CHN)	A	~~165~~	165	171	1st place, gold medalist(s)	191	205	207 WR	1st place, gold medalist(s)	378 CWR
2nd place, silver medalist(s)	Li Dayin (CHN)	A	~~166~~	166	171	2nd place, silver medalist(s)	198	~~206~~	206	2nd place, silver medalist(s)	377 WR
3rd place, bronze medalist(s)	Brayan Rodallegas (COL)	A	159	~~165~~	167	4	196	~~202~~	~~203~~	6	363
4	Rejepbaý Rejepow (TKM)	A	164	~~168~~	~~169~~	5	190	~~199~~	199	4	363
5	Yunder Beytula (BUL)	B	150	155	157	14	192	198	201	3rd place, bronze medalist(s)	358
6	Antonino Pizzolato (ITA)	A	155	160	163	7	~~195~~	195	~~201~~	9	358
7	Andrés Mata (ESP)	C	152	158	162	9	189	194	~~200~~	10	356
8	Zacarías Bonnat (DOM)	A	155	160	~~163~~	10	195	~~201~~	~~201~~	7	355
9	Harrison Maurus (USA)	B	~~152~~	~~152~~	152	18	191	198	~~205~~	5	350
10	Mukhammadkodir Toshtemirov (UZB)	B	155	159	~~162~~	11	~~185~~	185	189	14	348
11	Nico Müller (GER)	B	150	154	157	13	186	~~191~~	191	12	348
12	Ritvars Suharevs (LAT)	B	154	~~158~~	~~160~~	16	188	192	~~200~~	11	346
13	Viktor Getts (RUS)	B	154	~~158~~	158	12	186	~~190~~	~~191~~	16	344
14	Daniel Godelli (ALB)	B	155	~~160~~	~~163~~	15	185	~~190~~	—	18	340
15	Juan Solís (COL)	B	~~150~~	150	~~155~~	23	189	~~195~~	~~195~~	13	339
16	Krzysztof Zwarycz (POL)	B	150	~~153~~	~~153~~	22	182	185	~~189~~	19	335
17	Emil Moldodosov (KGZ)	C	145	150	153	17	175	180	~~182~~	23	333
18	Ajay Singh (IND)	C	140	~~144~~	146	26	175	181	187	15	333
19	Ahmed Farooq (IRQ)	C	~~142~~	142	147	25	181	185	~~188~~	17	332
20	Erkand Qerimaj (ALB)	B	~~151~~	151	—	20	181	—	—	21	332
21	Alex Bellemarre (CAN)	C	~~151~~	151	~~155~~	19	174	178	~~184~~	25	329
22	Christian Rodriguez Ocasio (USA)	C	~~145~~	147	~~153~~	24	~~180~~	180	~~190~~	24	327
23	Arley Méndez (CHI)	D	140	145	150	21	166	175	—	27	325
24	Şatlyk Şöhradow (TKM)	C	~~145~~	145	~~150~~	28	180	~~185~~	~~185~~	22	325
25	Chuang Sheng-min (TPE)	C	~~145~~	~~145~~	145	29	~~170~~	170	177	26	322
26	Nicolas Vachon (CAN)	C	~~137~~	137	~~142~~	30	170	181	~~184~~	20	318
27	Seán Brown (IRL)	D	~~142~~	142	145	27	168	172	~~175~~	28	317
28	Richard Tkáč (SVK)	D	133	~~137~~	~~137~~	31	160	166	~~172~~	29	299
29	Chinthana Vidanage (SRI)	D	128	~~132~~	133	32	165	~~171~~	~~171~~	30	298
30	Kabuati Bob (MHL)	D	~~120~~	120	125	33	156	161	~~167~~	31	286
31	Tuau Lapua Lapua (TUV)	D	116	121	~~126~~	35	145	150	155	32	276
32	Ika Aliklik (NRU)	D	117	120	124	34	145	150	~~158~~	33	274
—	Andranik Karapetyan (ARM)	A	168	~~172~~	~~172~~	3rd place, bronze medalist(s)	~~195~~	~~195~~	~~195~~	—	—
—	Choe Jon-wi (PRK)	A	158	163	~~166~~	6	~~190~~	~~190~~	~~190~~	—	—
—	Ri Chong-song (PRK)	A	155	160	163	8	~~195~~	—	—	—	—
—	Petr Asayonak (BLR)	A	~~165~~	~~165~~	~~165~~	—	190	195	~~202~~	8	—
—	Ihar Lozka (BLR)	B	~~155~~	~~155~~	~~155~~	—	~~188~~	~~188~~	—	—	—
—	Aidar Kazov (KAZ)	C	~~140~~	~~140~~	~~140~~	—	—	—	—	—	—
—	Alexander Hernández (PUR)	D	~~135~~	~~135~~	~~135~~	—	~~170~~	~~170~~	~~170~~	—	—
—	Lyle du Plooy (RSA)	D	~~118~~	~~119~~	~~120~~	—	—	—	—	—	—
DQ	Nijat Rahimov (KAZ)	C	140	145	~~150~~	—	180	185	189	—	—

== New records ==
Clean & Jerk	207 kg	Lü Xiaojun (CHN)	WR
Total	376 kg	Lü Xiaojun (CHN)	WR
Total	377 kg	Li Dayin (CHN)	WR
Total	378 kg	Lü Xiaojun (CHN)	WR
