= 2022 World Weightlifting Championships – Men's 89 kg =

The men's 89 kilograms competition at the 2022 World Weightlifting Championships was held on 10 and 11 December 2022.

== Schedule ==
Date	Time	Event
10 December 2022	11:30	Group C
11 December 2022	14:00	Group B
11 December 2022	19:00	Group A

== Medalists ==
Event	Gold		Silver		Bronze	
Snatch	Keydomar Vallenilla (VEN)	175 kg	Kianoush Rostami (IRI)	174 kg	Brayan Rodallegas (COL)	170 kg
Clean & Jerk	Karlos Nasar (BUL)	220 kg	Liu Huanhua (CHN)	215 kg	Brayan Rodallegas (COL)	211 kg
Total	Keydomar Vallenilla (VEN)	385 kg	Brayan Rodallegas (COL)	381 kg	Liu Huanhua (CHN)	381 kg

== Records ==
Prior to this competition, the existing world records were as follows.

World Record	Snatch	World Standard	179 kg	—	1 November 2018
World Record	Clean & Jerk	Antonino Pizzolato (ITA)	217 kg	Tirana, Albania	2 June 2022
World Record	Total	Antonino Pizzolato (ITA)	392 kg	Tirana, Albania	2 June 2022

== Results ==
Rank	Athlete	Group	Snatch (kg)				Clean & Jerk (kg)				Total
Rank	Athlete	Group	1	2	3	Rank	1	2	3	Rank	Total
1st place, gold medalist(s)	Keydomar Vallenilla (VEN)	A	~~171~~	171	175	1st place, gold medalist(s)	210	~~213~~	~~215~~	4	385
2nd place, silver medalist(s)	Brayan Rodallegas (COL)	A	~~170~~	170	~~174~~	3rd place, bronze medalist(s)	205	211	~~216~~	3rd place, bronze medalist(s)	381
3rd place, bronze medalist(s)	Liu Huanhua (CHN)	A	160	166	~~171~~	6	205	211	215	2nd place, silver medalist(s)	381
4	Kianoush Rostami (IRI)	A	170	~~174~~	174	2nd place, silver medalist(s)	206	~~212~~	~~212~~	5	380
5	Nathan Damron (USA)	A	157	162	167	4	196	203	~~208~~	6	370
6	Olfides Sáez (CUB)	B	156	161	~~165~~	9	~~196~~	196	201	7	362
7	Nico Müller (GER)	B	157	161	~~164~~	10	194	~~200~~	200	10	361
8	Revaz Davitadze (GEO)	A	165	~~170~~	~~171~~	7	193	~~198~~	~~201~~	13	358
9	Emil Moldodosov (KGZ)	B	160	164	~~167~~	8	~~190~~	190	~~195~~	16	354
10	Ariolvis Begué (CUB)	B	152	157	~~160~~	14	190	195	~~199~~	12	352
11	Armands Mežinskis (LAT)	B	152	~~157~~	~~158~~	20	191	196	200	9	352
12	Andranik Karapetyan (ARM)	A	166	~~172~~	~~174~~	5	~~186~~	186	~~191~~	19	352
13	Amur Al-Khanjari (OMA)	B	~~150~~	150	~~156~~	21	191	196	200	8	350
14	Assylzhan Bektay (KAZ)	B	~~158~~	158	~~164~~	13	190	~~195~~	~~195~~	14	348
15	Alex Bellemarre (CAN)	B	~~160~~	160	~~165~~	12	185	~~190~~	~~194~~	21	345
16	Vardan Manukyan (ARM)	B	~~150~~	150	155	16	190	~~200~~	~~202~~	15	345
17	Denis Ulanov (KAZ)	B	~~151~~	151	155	17	~~190~~	190	~~196~~	17	345
18	Faris Touairi (ALG)	C	~~160~~	~~160~~	160	11	175	180	~~185~~	27	340
19	Beau Brown (USA)	C	148	153	~~158~~	18	~~183~~	185	~~188~~	20	338
20	Artūrs Vasiļonoks (LAT)	C	149	~~152~~	~~153~~	23	181	~~187~~	188	18	337
21	Phacharamethi Tharaphan (THA)	C	140	~~145~~	~~148~~	27	~~191~~	191	196	11	336
22	Braydon Kennedy (CAN)	C	~~152~~	152	~~157~~	19	178	183	~~188~~	24	335
23	Şahzadbek Matýakubow (TKM)	B	~~150~~	~~150~~	150	22	~~185~~	185	~~191~~	22	335
24	Muhammad Zul Ilmi (INA)	C	143	147	~~152~~	24	~~182~~	183	~~188~~	25	330
25	Daisuke Shishido (JPN)	C	145	~~150~~	~~150~~	25	175	183	~~192~~	23	328
26	Mauricio Canul (MEX)	C	140	145	~~150~~	26	180	~~186~~	~~187~~	26	325
27	Alexander Hernández (PUR)	C	~~137~~	137	~~140~~	29	175	~~180~~	~~180~~	28	312
28	Axel Pavon (HON)	C	~~136~~	136	~~140~~	30	170	175	~~181~~	29	311
29	Seán Brown (IRL)	C	140	~~144~~	~~144~~	28	170	~~176~~	~~176~~	30	310
30	Yomar López (PUR)	C	~~130~~	130	136	31	150	160	~~163~~	31	296
—	Şatlyk Şöhradow (TKM)	B	155	~~158~~	~~158~~	15	~~185~~	~~185~~	~~185~~	—	—
—	Karlos Nasar (BUL)	A	~~173~~	~~173~~	~~174~~	—	212 JWR	~~217~~	220 WR	1st place, gold medalist(s)	—
—	Cristiano Ficco (ITA)	A	~~165~~	~~165~~	~~165~~	—	—	—	—	—	—
—	Tian Tao (CHN)	A	—	—	—	—	—	—	—	—	—
—	Michel Ngongang (CMR)	A	Did not start								
