= 2018 in weightlifting =

This article lists the main weightlifting events and their results for 2018.

== World weightlifting championships ==
- July 7–14: 2018 World Junior Weightlifting Championships in Tashkent
  - Uzbekistan won the gold medal tally. United States won the overall medal tally.
- September 20–23: 2018 FISU World University Weightlifting Championships in (Poland) Biała Podlaska
  - Both Japan and Chinese Taipei won 3 gold medals and 8 overall medals each.
- Octobre 7 – 13: 2018 Summer Youth Olympics in Buenos Aires, Argentina.
  - Turkey won 2 gold medals and 4 medals in overall.
- November 1–10: 2018 World Weightlifting Championships in (Turkmenistan) Ashgabat
  - China won both the gold and overall medal tallies.

== Continental and regional weightlifting championships ==
- March 23–30: 2018 African Junior & Youth Weightlifting Championships in Cairo
  - Junior: Egypt won both the gold and overall medal tallies.
  - Youth: Egypt won both the gold and overall medal tallies.
- March 26 – April 1: 2018 European Weightlifting Championships in Bucharest
  - Georgia won the gold medal tally. Romania won the overall medal tally.
- April 20–30: 2018 Asian Junior & Youth Weightlifting Championships in Urgench
  - Junior: Uzbekistan won both the gold and overall medal tallies.
  - Youth: Uzbekistan won both the gold and overall medal tallies.
- May 12–19: 2018 Pan American Weightlifting Championships in (Dominican Republic) Santo Domingo
  - Men: Six national teams won 3 gold medals each. Colombia won the overall medal tally.
  - Women: Colombia won both the gold and overall medal tallies.
- May 28–31: 2018 South American Weightlifting Championships in (Bolivia) Cochabamba (in conjunction with the 2018 South American Games)
  - Colombia won both the gold and overall medal tallies.
- June 3–10: 2018 Pan American Youth Weightlifting Championships in Palmira
  - Colombia and Mexico won 4 gold and 13 overall medals each.
- June 26–30: 2018 Oceania Senior, Junior, & Youth Weightlifting Championships in (France) / (New Caledonia) Le Mont-Dore
  - Senior: Papua New Guinea won the gold medal tally. New Zealand and Nauru won ten overall medals each.
  - Junior: Nauru won both the gold and overall medal tallies.
  - Youth: Nauru won the gold medal tally. Australia won the overall medal tally.
- July 22–29: 2018 European Youth Weightlifting Championships in (Italy) Milan
  - Bulgaria won the gold medal tally. Romania won the overall medal tally.
- September 5–12: 2018 Pan American Junior Weightlifting Championships in Manizales
  - Colombia won both the gold and overall medal tallies.
- October 20–27: 2018 European Junior Weightlifting Championships in (Poland) Zamość
  - Note: This event was scheduled for A Coruña, but the EWF took away the event because of politics.
  - Men: Belarus won the gold medal tally. Armenia won the overall medal tally.
  - Women: Turkey and Russia won 5 gold medals each. Turkey won the overall medal tally.
