= List of Bosnian and Herzegovinian records in Olympic weightlifting =

The following are the national records in Olympic weightlifting in Bosnia and Herzegovina. Records are maintained in each weight class for the snatch lift, clean and jerk lift, and the total for both lifts by the Weightlifting Federation of Bosnia and Herzegovina (Savez Dizača Tegova Bosne i Hercegovine).

== Current records ==
=== Men ===
Event	Record	Athlete	Date	Meet	Place	Ref
60 kg
Snatch	80 kg	Standard				
Clean & Jerk	100 kg	Standard				
Total	180 kg	Standard				
65 kg
Snatch	95 kg	Standard				
Clean & Jerk	115 kg	Standard				
Total	210 kg	Standard				
71 kg
Snatch	101 kg	Faris Durak	2 December 2025	Balkan Championships	Durrës, Albania	
Clean & Jerk	118 kg	Standard				
Total	218 kg	Standard				
79 kg
Snatch	115 kg	Standard				
Clean & Jerk	145 kg	Standard				
Total	260 kg	Standard				
88 kg
Snatch	168 kg	Andranik Karapetyan	3 December 2025	Balkan Championships	Durrës, Albania	
Clean & Jerk	189 kg	Andranik Karapetyan	3 December 2025	Balkan Championships	Durrës, Albania	
Clean & Jerk	194 kg	Andranik Karapetyan	23 April 2026	European Championships	Batumi, Georgia	
Total	357 kg	Andranik Karapetyan	3 December 2025	Balkan Championships	Durrës, Albania	
Total	361 kg	Andranik Karapetyan	23 April 2026	European Championships	Batumi, Georgia	
94 kg
Snatch	165 kg	Andranik Karapetyan	23 August 2025		Meissen, Germany	
Clean & Jerk	191 kg	Andranik Karapetyan	23 August 2025		Meissen, Germany	
Total	356 kg	Andranik Karapetyan	23 August 2025		Meissen, Germany	
110 kg
Snatch	150 kg	Standard				
Clean & Jerk	190 kg	Yasser Salem	25 October 2025		Sarajevo, Bosnia and Herzegovina	
Total	340 kg	Yasser Salem	25 October 2025		Sarajevo, Bosnia and Herzegovina	
+110 kg
Snatch	155 kg	Standard				
Clean & Jerk	180 kg	Standard				
Total	330 kg	Standard				

=== Women ===
Event	Record	Athlete	Date	Meet	Place	Ref
48 kg
Snatch	55 kg	Standard				
Clean & Jerk	70 kg	Standard				
Total	125 kg	Standard				
53 kg
Snatch	45 kg	Standard				
Clean & Jerk	52 kg	Standard				
Total	97 kg	Standard				
58 kg
Snatch	56 kg	Sarah Durak	2 December 2025	Balkan Championships	Durrës, Albania	
Snatch	57 kg	Sarah Durak	20 April 2026	European Championships	Batumi, Georgia	
Clean & Jerk	66 kg	Sarah Durak	2 December 2025	Balkan Championships	Durrës, Albania	
Clean & Jerk	70 kg	Sarah Durak	20 April 2026	European Championships	Batumi, Georgia	
Total	122 kg	Sarah Durak	2 December 2025	Balkan Championships	Durrës, Albania	
Total	127 kg	Sarah Durak	20 April 2026	European Championships	Batumi, Georgia	
63 kg
Snatch	65 kg	Standard				
Clean & Jerk	85 kg	Standard				
Total	150 kg	Standard				
69 kg
Snatch	72 kg	Željka Miljković	25 October 2025		Sarajevo, Bosnia and Herzegovina	
Clean & Jerk	85 kg	Standard				
Total	157 kg	Željka Miljković	25 October 2025		Sarajevo, Bosnia and Herzegovina	
77 kg
Snatch	72 kg	Standard				
Clean & Jerk	87 kg	Standard				
Total	159 kg	Standard				
86 kg
Snatch	80 kg	Standard				
Clean & Jerk	100 kg	Standard				
Total	180 kg	Standard				
+86 kg
Snatch	82 kg	Standard				
Clean & Jerk	102 kg	Standard				
Total	184 kg	Standard				

== Historical records ==
=== Men (2018–2025) ===
Event	Record	Athlete	Date	Meet	Place	Ref
55 kg
Snatch	66 kg	Georgije Bogojević	12 October 2024		Sarajevo, Bosnia and Herzegovina	
Clean & Jerk	90 kg	Georgije Bogojević	12 October 2024		Sarajevo, Bosnia and Herzegovina	
Total	156 kg	Georgije Bogojević	12 October 2024		Sarajevo, Bosnia and Herzegovina	
61 kg
Snatch	85 kg	Faris Durak	25 September 2021	European Junior Championships	Rovaniemi, Finland	
Clean & Jerk	102 kg	Faris Durak	1 July 2022	Mediterranean Games	Oran, Algeria	
Total	185 kg	Faris Durak	25 September 2021	European Junior Championships	Rovaniemi, Finland	
67 kg
Snatch	100 kg	Faris Durak	14 February 2024	European Championships	Sofia, Bulgaria	
Clean & Jerk	118 kg	Faris Durak	28 July 2023	European U23 Championships	Bucharest, Romania	
Total	215 kg	Amar Pašić	2 March 2023	Bosnian and Herzegovinian Championships	Sarajevo, Bosnia and Herzegovina	
73 kg
Snatch	100 kg	Faris Durak	24 June 2023		Zalaegerszeg, Hungary	
Clean & Jerk	120 kg	Amar Pašić	26 June 2021		Sarajevo, Bosnia and Herzegovina	
Total	217 kg	Faris Durak	24 June 2023		Zalaegerszeg, Hungary	
81 kg
Snatch	118 kg	Benjamin Druškić	16 October 2021		Sarajevo, Bosnia and Herzegovina	
Clean & Jerk	150 kg	Benjamin Druškić	27 November 2021		Sarajevo, Bosnia and Herzegovina	
Total	265 kg	Benjamin Druškić	27 November 2021		Sarajevo, Bosnia and Herzegovina	
89 kg
Snatch	150 kg	Andranik Karapetiyan	31 May 2025		Sarajevo, Bosnia and Herzegovina	
Clean & Jerk	170 kg	Andranik Karapetiyan	31 May 2025		Sarajevo, Bosnia and Herzegovina	
Total	320 kg	Andranik Karapetiyan	31 May 2025		Sarajevo, Bosnia and Herzegovina	
96 kg
Snatch	141 kg	Dino Smajić	2 March 2024	Bosnian and Herzegovinian Championships	Sarajevo, Bosnia and Herzegovina	
Clean & Jerk	167 kg	Dino Smajić	2 March 2024	Bosnian and Herzegovinian Championships	Sarajevo, Bosnia and Herzegovina	
Total	308 kg	Dino Smajić	2 March 2024	Bosnian and Herzegovinian Championships	Sarajevo, Bosnia and Herzegovina	
102 kg
Snatch	160 kg	Osama Yassir Hamdana	31 May 2025		Sarajevo, Bosnia and Herzegovina	
Clean & Jerk	171 kg	Osama Yassir Hamdana	31 May 2025		Sarajevo, Bosnia and Herzegovina	
Total	331 kg	Osama Yassir Hamdana	31 May 2025		Sarajevo, Bosnia and Herzegovina	
109 kg
Snatch	130 kg	Dino Smajić	31 May 2025		Sarajevo, Bosnia and Herzegovina	
Clean & Jerk	160 kg	Dino Smajić	31 May 2025		Sarajevo, Bosnia and Herzegovina	
Total	290 kg	Dino Smajić	31 May 2025		Sarajevo, Bosnia and Herzegovina	
+109 kg
Snatch	140 kg	Ermin Jusufović	27 February 2021		Sarajevo, Bosnia and Herzegovina	
Clean & Jerk	181 kg	Ermin Jusufović	27 February 2021		Sarajevo, Bosnia and Herzegovina	
Total	321 kg	Ermin Jusufović	27 February 2021		Sarajevo, Bosnia and Herzegovina	

=== Women (2018–2025) ===
Event	Record	Athlete	Date	Meet	Place	Ref
45 kg
Snatch	44 kg	Nejla Kalača	28 May 2022	European Championships	Tirana, Albania	
Clean & Jerk	55 kg	Nejla Kalača	18 June 2022		Sarajevo, Bosnia and Herzegovina	
Total	99 kg	Nejla Kalača	18 June 2022		Sarajevo, Bosnia and Herzegovina	
49 kg
Snatch	57 kg	Tihana Majer	12 October 2024		Sarajevo, Bosnia and Herzegovina	
Clean & Jerk	75 kg	Tihana Majer	12 October 2024		Sarajevo, Bosnia and Herzegovina	
Total	132 kg	Tihana Majer	12 October 2024		Sarajevo, Bosnia and Herzegovina	
55 kg
Snatch	45 kg	Sarah Durak	2 March 2024	Bosnian and Herzegovinian Championships	Sarajevo, Bosnia and Herzegovina	
Clean & Jerk	52 kg	Sarah Durak	12 October 2024		Sarajevo, Bosnia and Herzegovina	
Total	97 kg	Sarah Durak	12 October 2024		Sarajevo, Bosnia and Herzegovina	
59 kg
Snatch	51 kg	Sarah Durak	31 May 2025		Sarajevo, Bosnia and Herzegovina	
Clean & Jerk	61 kg	Sarah Durak	31 May 2025		Sarajevo, Bosnia and Herzegovina	
Total	112 kg	Sarah Durak	31 May 2025		Sarajevo, Bosnia and Herzegovina	
64 kg
Snatch	66 kg	Azra Alatović	16 April 2025	European Championships	Chișinău, Moldova	
Clean & Jerk	85 kg	Azra Alatović	16 April 2025	European Championships	Chișinău, Moldova	
Total	151 kg	Azra Alatović	16 April 2025	European Championships	Chișinău, Moldova	
71 kg
Snatch	77 kg	Ksenija Kecman	7 September 2019		Konjic, Bosnia and Herzegovina	
Clean & Jerk	90 kg	Ksenija Kecman	7 September 2019		Konjic, Bosnia and Herzegovina	
Total	160 kg	Ksenija Kecman	7 September 2019		Konjic, Bosnia and Herzegovina	
76 kg
Snatch	70 kg	Amila Avdukuć	27 February 2021		Sarajevo, Bosnia and Herzegovina	
Clean & Jerk	80 kg	Amila Avdukuć	27 February 2021		Sarajevo, Bosnia and Herzegovina	
Total	150 kg	Amila Avdukuć	27 February 2021		Sarajevo, Bosnia and Herzegovina	
81 kg
Snatch	64 kg	Rubina Mešović Kljaho	25 November 2018		Sarajevo, Bosnia and Herzegovina	
Clean & Jerk	71 kg	Marija Dobrošević	21 October 2023		Sarajevo, Bosnia and Herzegovina	
Total	134 kg	Rubina Mešović Kljaho	25 November 2018		Sarajevo, Bosnia and Herzegovina	
87 kg
Snatch	81 kg	Abida Ćorić	21 October 2023		Sarajevo, Bosnia and Herzegovina	
Clean & Jerk	102 kg	Abida Ćorić	21 October 2023		Sarajevo, Bosnia and Herzegovina	
Total	183 kg	Abida Ćorić	21 October 2023		Sarajevo, Bosnia and Herzegovina	
+87 kg
Snatch	40 kg	Amina Mašić	27 May 2023		Sarajevo, Bosnia and Herzegovina	
Clean & Jerk	50 kg	Amina Mašić	27 May 2023		Sarajevo, Bosnia and Herzegovina	
Total	90 kg	Amina Mašić	27 May 2023		Sarajevo, Bosnia and Herzegovina	
