= 2018 World Weightlifting Championships – Men's 81 kg =

The men's 81 kilograms competition at the 2018 World Weightlifting Championships was held on 4–5 November 2018.

== Schedule ==
Date	Time	Event
4 November 2018	08:00	Group D
5 November 2018	10:00	Group C
5 November 2018	12:00	Group B
5 November 2018	17:25	Group A

== Medalists ==
Event	Gold		Silver		Bronze	
Snatch	Mohamed Ehab (EGY)	173 kg	Lü Xiaojun (CHN)	172 kg	Li Dayin (CHN)	168 kg
Clean & Jerk	Li Dayin (CHN)	204 kg	Lü Xiaojun (CHN)	202 kg	Mohamed Ehab (EGY)	200 kg
Total	Lü Xiaojun (CHN)	374 kg	Mohamed Ehab (EGY)	373 kg	Li Dayin (CHN)	372 kg

== Records ==
Prior to this competition, the existing world records were as follows.

World Record	Snatch	World Standard	170 kg	—	1 November 2018
World Record	Clean & Jerk	World Standard	206 kg	—	1 November 2018
World Record	Total	World Standard	368 kg	—	1 November 2018

== Results ==
Rank	Athlete	Group	Snatch (kg)				Clean & Jerk (kg)				Total
Rank	Athlete	Group	1	2	3	Rank	1	2	3	Rank	Total
1st place, gold medalist(s)	Lü Xiaojun (CHN)	A	165	~~170~~	172 WR	2nd place, silver medalist(s)	197	202	~~205~~	2nd place, silver medalist(s)	374 WR
2nd place, silver medalist(s)	Mohamed Ehab (EGY)	A	165	170	173 WR	1st place, gold medalist(s)	196	200	~~203~~	3rd place, bronze medalist(s)	373 WR
3rd place, bronze medalist(s)	Li Dayin (CHN)	A	163 JWR	168 CJWR	~~172~~	3rd place, bronze medalist(s)	193 JWR	198 JWR	204 JWR	1st place, gold medalist(s)	372 JWR
4	Rejepbaý Rejepow (TKM)	A	160	~~166~~	166	5	~~196~~	197	~~203~~	5	363
5	Petr Asayonak (BLR)	A	161	~~166~~	167	4	~~190~~	190	~~197~~	10	357
6	Harrison Maurus (USA)	A	150	154	157	7	191 JWR	195 JWR	200 JWR	4	357
7	Nico Müller (GER)	B	148	153	156	9	187	192	~~196~~	6	348
8	Safaa Rashed (IRQ)	A	150	~~155~~	155	11	191	~~196~~	~~201~~	9	346
9	Hugo Montes (COL)	B	~~154~~	154	~~157~~	15	185	191	~~196~~	7	345
10	Andrés Mata (ESP)	B	150	154	~~156~~	12	184	187	191	8	345
11	Ritvars Suharevs (LAT)	B	153	~~156~~	159 JWR	6	~~184~~	185	~~191~~	15	344
12	Max Lang (GER)	B	150	154	~~157~~	14	180	185	~~190~~	14	339
13	Addriel La O (CUB)	B	148	153	~~156~~	16	~~180~~	180	185	16	338
14	Ihar Lozka (BLR)	C	140	145	148	25	180	188	~~191~~	11	336
15	Renson Balza (VEN)	B	150	154	~~156~~	13	182	~~185~~	~~185~~	20	336
16	Yunder Beytula (BUL)	B	143	~~148~~	149	23	183	~~188~~	~~189~~	17	332
17	Razmik Unanyan (RUS)	C	143	147	150	20	175	181	~~187~~	21	331
18	Olfides Sáez (CUB)	B	~~148~~	148	~~153~~	27	~~183~~	~~183~~	183	18	331
19	Aidar Kazov (KAZ)	B	145	~~150~~	~~150~~	31	186	~~190~~	~~190~~	12	331
20	Alex Bellemarre (CAN)	D	148	152	~~156~~	17	174	178	~~184~~	26	330
21	Ahmed Farooq (IRQ)	C	141	~~145~~	145	30	180	185	~~187~~	13	330
22	Viktor Getts (RUS)	B	150	~~155~~	~~155~~	21	180	—	—	23	330
23	Erkand Qerimaj (ALB)	B	~~150~~	150	—	22	180	—	—	24	330
24	Ihor Konotop (UKR)	C	~~145~~	145	148	26	179	~~184~~	~~184~~	25	327
25	You Jae-sik (KOR)	C	145	150	~~157~~	19	175	~~182~~	~~182~~	29	325
26	Ajay Singh (IND)	D	143	~~148~~	148	24	~~174~~	174	~~183~~	31	322
27	Takehiro Kasai (JPN)	C	~~140~~	140	~~145~~	38	~~180~~	~~180~~	181	22	321
28	Richard Tkáč (SVK)	C	138	142	145	29	171	~~175~~	175	30	320
29	Jack Oliver (GBR)	D	138	~~142~~	143	33	168	172	176	28	319
30	Karol Samko (SVK)	C	137	~~140~~	~~140~~	40	~~182~~	182	—	19	319
31	Bastián López (CHI)	D	132	136	140	37	170	177	~~180~~	27	317
32	Daýanç Aşyrow (TKM)	C	142	~~146~~	147	28	170	~~175~~	~~175~~	36	317
33	Pornchai Lobsi (THA)	D	135	140	143	32	165	170	173	33	316
34	Chiang Tsung-han (TPE)	C	139	142	~~145~~	35	173	~~178~~	~~178~~	34	315
35	Omed Alam (DEN)	C	135	139	141	36	165	170	174	32	315
36	Seán Brown (IRL)	D	138	~~142~~	~~142~~	39	160	167	~~173~~	37	305
37	Kanan Aliguliyev (AZE)	D	125	~~130~~	130	43	160	165	170	35	300
38	Sami Köngäs (FIN)	D	125	128	~~130~~	44	160	163	~~168~~	38	291
39	Lyle du Plooy (RSA)	D	120	~~125~~	~~125~~	45	140	~~147~~	~~147~~	40	260
40	Einar Jónsson (ISL)	D	107	111	~~120~~	46	140	~~145~~	~~150~~	39	251
41	Arbnor Krasniqi (KOS)	D	102	105	~~107~~	47	130	~~134~~	~~137~~	41	235
42	Hamad Al-Breiki (UAE)	D	60	65	~~70~~	48	75	~~82~~	85	42	150
—	Kim Woo-jae (KOR)	B	~~155~~	156	~~163~~	8	~~190~~	~~190~~	~~190~~	—	—
—	Daniel Godelli (ALB)	A	156	~~162~~	~~162~~	10	~~186~~	~~186~~	~~186~~	—	—
—	Krzysztof Zwarycz (POL)	A	152	~~156~~	~~156~~	18	~~190~~	~~190~~	~~191~~	—	—
—	Alberto Fernández (ESP)	C	143	~~148~~	~~148~~	34	~~172~~	—	—	—	—
—	Amar Musić (CRO)	D	~~135~~	135	~~140~~	41	—	—	—	—	—
—	Daniel Chertkov (ISR)	C	135	~~140~~	~~140~~	42	~~175~~	~~175~~	~~175~~	—	—
—	Andranik Karapetyan (ARM)	A	~~171~~	~~171~~	~~171~~	—	—	—	—	—	—
—	Ivan Markov (BUL)	A	~~161~~	~~161~~	~~161~~	—	~~192~~	~~193~~	~~195~~	—	—

== New records ==
Snatch	172 kg	Lü Xiaojun (CHN)	WR
Snatch	173 kg	Mohamed Ehab (EGY)	WR
Total	369 kg	Mohamed Ehab (EGY)	WR
Total	373 kg	Mohamed Ehab (EGY)	WR
Total	374 kg	Lü Xiaojun (CHN)	WR
