= Weightlifting at the 2020 Summer Olympics – Men's 81 kg =

Men's 81 kg at the Games of the XXXII Olympiad
- Venue: Tokyo International Forum
- Date: 31 July 2021
- Competitors: 14 from 14 nations
- Winning total: 374 kg OR

Medalists
1st place, gold medalist(s)		Lü Xiaojun; China
2nd place, silver medalist(s)		Zacarías Bonnat; Dominican Republic
3rd place, bronze medalist(s)		Antonino Pizzolato; Italy

The men's 81 kg weightlifting competitions at the 2020 Summer Olympics in Tokyo took place on 31 July 2021 at the Tokyo International Forum. Lü Xiaojun won the gold, with a combined lift of 374 kg.

== Records ==
Prior to this competition, the existing world and Olympic records were as follows.

World Record	Snatch	Li Dayin (CHN)	175 kg	Tashkent, Uzbekistan	21 April 2021
World Record	Clean & Jerk	Lü Xiaojun (CHN)	207 kg	Pattaya, Thailand	22 September 2019
World Record	Total	Lü Xiaojun (CHN)	378 kg	Pattaya, Thailand	22 September 2019
Olympic Record	Snatch	Olympic Standard	168 kg	—	1 November 2018
Olympic Record	Clean & Jerk	Olympic Standard	201 kg	—	1 November 2018
Olympic Record	Total	Olympic Standard	365 kg	—	1 November 2018

== Results ==
Rank	Athlete	Nation	Group	Body weight	Snatch (kg)				Clean & Jerk (kg)				Total
Rank	Athlete	Nation	Group	Body weight	1	2	3	Result	1	2	3	Result	Total
1st place, gold medalist(s)	Lü Xiaojun	China	A	80.75	~~165~~	165	170	170 OR	197	204	~~210~~	204 OR	374 OR
2nd place, silver medalist(s)	Zacarías Bonnat	Dominican Republic	A	80.90	158	~~163~~	163	163	198	202	204	204	367
3rd place, bronze medalist(s)	Antonino Pizzolato	Italy	A	80.90	~~165~~	165	~~168~~	165	200	~~203~~	~~210~~	200	365
4	Harrison Maurus	United States	A	80.95	153	158	161	161	195	200	~~205~~	200	361
5	Brayan Rodallegas	Colombia	A	80.80	163	~~168~~	~~168~~	163	~~195~~	196	~~200~~	196	359
6	Ritvars Suharevs	Latvia	A	80.90	~~158~~	158	163	163	190	195	~~198~~	195	358
7	Nico Müller	Germany	A	80.90	155	159	~~161~~	159	190	~~195~~	195	195	354
8	Andrés Mata	Spain	A	80.70	154	158	~~161~~	158	~~189~~	~~189~~	189	189	347
9	Erkand Qerimaj	Albania	B	80.55	151	155	157	157	181	~~185~~	~~187~~	181	338
10	Amur Salim Al-Khanjari	Oman	B	81.00	130	~~137~~	140	140	170	~~176~~	177	177	317
11	Cameron McTaggart	New Zealand	B	80.80	135	140	~~145~~	140	170	175	~~178~~	175	315
12	Ramzi Bahloul	Tunisia	B		136	~~140~~	~~140~~	136	164	~~171~~	—	164	300
—	Rejepbaý Rejepow	Turkmenistan	A	80.95	160	164	~~167~~	164	~~195~~	~~195~~	~~198~~	—	—
—	Arley Méndez	Chile	A	81.00	160	~~163~~	~~165~~	160	~~190~~	~~190~~	~~190~~	—	—

== New records ==
Snatch	170 kg	Lü Xiaojun (CHN)	OR
Clean & Jerk	204 kg	Lü Xiaojun (CHN)	OR
Total	367 kg	Lü Xiaojun (CHN)	OR
Total	374 kg	Lü Xiaojun (CHN)	OR
