= Weightlifting at the 2019 Pan American Games – Men's 81 kg =

Weightlifting – Men's 81kg at the 2019 Pan American Games
- Venue: Coliseo Mariscal Caceres
- Dates: July 28
- Competitors: 6 from 5 nations

Medalists
Gold medal	Brayan Rodallegas	Colombia
Silver medal	Zacarías Bonnat	Dominican Republic
Bronze medal	Harrison Maurus	United States

The men's 81 kg competition of the weightlifting events at the 2019 Pan American Games in Lima, Peru, was held on July 28 at the Coliseo Mariscal Caceres.

== Results ==
6 athletes from five countries took part.

Rank	Athlete	Nation	Group	Snatch (kg)				Clean & Jerk (kg)				Total
Rank	Athlete	Nation	Group	1	2	3	Result	1	2	3	Result	Total
1st place, gold medalist(s)	Brayan Rodallegas	Colombia	A	157	163	167	167	191	196	~~207~~	196	363
2nd place, silver medalist(s)	Zacarías Bonnat	Dominican Republic	A	151	156	160	160	191	196	200	200	360
3rd place, bronze medalist(s)	Harrison Maurus	United States	A	145	150	155	155	190	195	~~198~~	195	350
4	Christian Rodriguez Ocasio	United States	A	143	148	152	152	~~175~~	175	~~185~~	175	327
5	Eustaciano Arias	Panama	A	125	~~130~~	130	130	~~155~~	155	~~160~~	155	285
	Alexander Hernández	Puerto Rico	A	~~140~~	~~140~~	~~140~~	—	—	—	—	—	DNF

== New records ==
Snatch	163 kg	Brayan Rodallegas (COL)	AM, PR
Sntach	167 kg	Brayan Rodallegas (COL)	AM, PR
