= Li Dayin =

Chinese weightlifter (born 1998)

Personal information
- Nationality: Chinese
- Born: 12 February 1998 (age 28); Xiushan County, Chongqing, China
- Height: 1.75 m (5 ft 9 in)
- Weight: 88.48 kg (195 lb)

Sport
- Country: China
- Sport: Weightlifting
- Event: –89 kg

Achievements and titles
- Personal bests: Snatch: 180 kg (2023, WR); Clean & Jerk: 216 kg (2023); Total: 396 kg (2023 CWR)
Medal record
Representing China
World Championships
Gold medal – first place	2022 Bogotá	–81 kg
Silver medal – second place	2019 Pattaya	–81 kg
Silver medal – second place	2023 Riyadh	–89 kg
Bronze medal – third place	2018 Ashgabat	–81 kg
Asian Championships
Gold medal – first place	2019 Ningbo	–81 kg
Gold medal – first place	2023 Jinju	–89 kg
Silver medal – second place	2025 Jiangshan	–89 kg
National Games of China
Gold medal – first place	2021 Shaanxi	–81 kg

Li Dayin (Chinese: 李大银; pinyin: Lǐ Dàyín; born 12 February 1998) is a Chinese weightlifter. He is a World Champion, Asian Champion and has held the snatch junior world record in the defunct 81 kg division, as well as the snatch and total senior world record in the defunct 89 kg division. He won the gold medal in the men's 81 kg event at the 2022 World Weightlifting Championships held in Bogotá, Colombia.

== Career ==
=== World Championships ===
In 2018 the International Weightlifting Federation updated the weight classes, and he competed in the newly created 81 kg division as the 2018 World Championships. The 81 kg competition saw 5 world records set and 11 junior world records set. In the snatch portion Li set two junior world records and was in third place after Lü Xiaojun and Mohamed Ihab exchanged world record lifts. In the clean & jerk portion of the competition he exchanged junior world records with Harrison Maurus, his final gold medal winning lift of 204 kg secured him the bronze medal in the total and junior world records in all lifts.

=== Other Competitions ===
He competed at the 2019 IWF World Cup (a qualifying event for the 2020 Summer Olympics) held in Fuzhou. He swept gold and set a new world record in the total with 375 kg.

== Major results ==
Year	Venue	Weight	Snatch (kg)				Clean & Jerk (kg)				Total	Rank
Year	Venue	Weight	1	2	3	Rank	1	2	3	Rank	Total	Rank
Representing China
World Championships
2018	Ashgabat, Turkmenistan	81 kg	163	168	~~172~~	3rd place, bronze medalist(s)	193	198	204	1st place, gold medalist(s)	372	3rd place, bronze medalist(s)
2019	Pattaya, Thailand	81 kg	~~166~~	166	171	2nd place, silver medalist(s)	198	~~206~~	206	2nd place, silver medalist(s)	377 WR	2nd place, silver medalist(s)
2022	Bogotá, Colombia	81 kg	167	171	~~174~~	1st place, gold medalist(s)	196	~~201~~	201	2nd place, silver medalist(s)	372	1st place, gold medalist(s)
2023	Riyadh, Saudi Arabia	89 kg	170	~~177~~	~~177~~	4	206	~~213~~	213	2nd place, silver medalist(s)	383	2nd place, silver medalist(s)
Asian Championships
2019	Ningbo, China	81 kg	163	168	~~172~~	1st place, gold medalist(s)	~~195~~	195	~~200~~	4	363	1st place, gold medalist(s)
2021	Tashkent, Uzbekistan	81 kg	167	172	175 CWR	1st place, gold medalist(s)	~~198~~	~~198~~	~~198~~	–	–	–
2023	Jinju, South Korea	89 kg	171	176	180 WR	1st place, gold medalist(s)	205	~~216~~	216	2nd place, silver medalist(s)	396 WR	1st place, gold medalist(s)
2025	Jiangshan, China	89 kg	170	176	–	1st place, gold medalist(s)	203	~~210~~	~~210~~	3rd place, bronze medalist(s)	379	2nd place, silver medalist(s)
IWF World Cup
2019	Fuzhou, China	81 kg	163	~~168~~	171	1st place, gold medalist(s)	195	200	204	1st place, gold medalist(s)	375 WR	1st place, gold medalist(s)
2019	Tianjin, China	81 kg	165	~~171~~	171	1st place, gold medalist(s)	190	195	200	1st place, gold medalist(s)	371	1st place, gold medalist(s)
2024	Phuket, Thailand	89 kg	173	~~177~~	~~178~~	3rd place, bronze medalist(s)	~~210~~	210	~~216~~	4	383	3rd place, bronze medalist(s)

- CWR: Current world record
- WR: World record
