= Weightlifting at the 2018 South American Games =

- Venue: Coliseo Grover Suárez
- Dates: 28–31 May
- Nations: 12

There were 16 weightlifting events at the 2018 South American Games in Cochabamba, Bolivia. Eight for men and women. The events were held between May 28 and 31 at the Coliseo Grover Suárez.

== Medal summary ==
=== Men ===
Event	Gold		Silver		Bronze	
56 kg
Snatch	Carlos Berna; Colombia	116 kg	Wilder Posada; Colombia	110 kg	Marcos Rojas; Peru	107 kg
Clean & Jerk	Wilder Posada; Colombia	143 kg	Carlos Berna; Colombia	142 kg	Marcos Rojas; Peru	138 kg
Total	Carlos Berna; Colombia	258 kg	Wilder Posada; Colombia	253 kg	Marcos Rojas; Peru	245 kg
62 kg
Snatch	Jhon Serna; Colombia	127 kg	Cristhian Zurita; Ecuador	127 kg	Luis Higuita; Colombia	125 kg
Clean & Jerk	Jhon Serna; Colombia	165 kg	Luis Higuita; Colombia	157 kg	Cristhian Zurita; Ecuador	154 kg
Total	Jhon Serna; Colombia	292 kg	Luis Higuita; Colombia	282 kg	Cristhian Zurita; Ecuador	281 kg
69 kg
Snatch	Julio Pernia; Venezuela	145 kg	Oscar Terrones; Peru	126 kg	Luis Bardalez; Peru	124 kg
Clean & Jerk	Julio Pernia; Venezuela	180 kg	Vinicius Dias De Carvalho; Brazil	163 kg	Jairo Merino Lara; Ecuador	160 kg
Total	Julio Pernia; Venezuela	325 kg	Oscar Terrones; Peru	285 kg	Vinicius Dias De Carvalho; Brazil	284 kg
77 kg
Snatch	Hugo Montes; Colombia	157 kg	Renson Balza; Venezuela	147 kg	Yony Andica; Colombia	146 kg
Clean & Jerk	Hugo Montes; Colombia	185 kg	Yony Andica; Colombia	185 kg	Renson Balza; Venezuela	181 kg
Total	Hugo Montes; Colombia	342 kg	Yony Andica; Colombia	331 kg	Renson Balza; Venezuela	328 kg
85 kg
Snatch	Arley Méndez; Chile	165 kg	Keydomar Vallenilla; Venezuela	160 kg	Kevin Wormald; Chile	146 kg
Clean & Jerk	Arley Méndez; Chile	212 kg AM	Keydomar Vallenilla; Venezuela	200 kg	Kevin Wormald; Chile	184 kg
Total	Arley Méndez; Chile	377 kg	Keydomar Vallenilla; Venezuela	360 kg	Kevin Wormald; Chile	330 kg
94 kg
Snatch	Brayan Rodallegas; Colombia	164 kg	Yeyson Arias; Venezuela	161 kg	Paul Ferrin; Ecuador	160 kg
Clean & Jerk	Yeyson Arias; Venezuela	202 kg	Paul Ferrin; Ecuador	200 kg	Brayan Rodallegas; Colombia	198 kg
Total	Yeyson Arias; Venezuela	363 kg	Brayan Rodallegas; Colombia	362 kg	Paul Ferrin; Ecuador	360 kg
105 kg
Snatch	Jorge Arroyo; Ecuador	182 kg	Jesús González; Venezuela	174 kg	Wilmer Contreras; Ecuador	158 kg
Clean & Jerk	Jesús González; Venezuela	211 kg	Jorge Arroyo; Ecuador	202 kg	Hernán Viera; Peru	201 kg
Total	Jesús González; Venezuela	385 kg	Jorge Arroyo; Ecuador	384 kg	Hernán Viera; Peru	356 kg
+105 kg
Snatch	Anderson Calero; Ecuador	165 kg	Joel Kuiperi; Aruba	144 kg	Alejo Solito; Argentina	143 kg
Clean & Jerk	Anderson Calero; Ecuador	200 kg	Joel Kuiperi; Aruba	175 kg	Alejo Solito; Argentina	175 kg
Total	Anderson Calero; Ecuador	365 kg	Joel Kuiperi; Aruba	319 kg	Alejo Solito; Argentina	318 kg

=== Women ===
Event	Gold		Silver		Bronze	
48 kg
Snatch	Luana Madeira; Brazil	77 kg	Angélica Campoverde; Ecuador	73 kg	Emily Figueiredo; Brazil	71 kg
Clean & Jerk	Angélica Campoverde; Ecuador	95 kg	Emily Figueiredo; Brazil	91 kg	Luana Madeira; Brazil	90 kg
Total	Angélica Campoverde; Ecuador	168 kg	Luana Madeira; Brazil	167 kg	Emily Figueiredo; Brazil	162 kg
53 kg
Snatch	Yenny Sinisterra; Colombia	86 kg	Tessy Sandi; Peru	81 kg	Karen Fernandez; Venezuela	80 kg
Clean & Jerk	Yenny Sinisterra; Colombia	107 kg	Tessy Sandi; Peru	107 kg	Karen Fernandez; Venezuela	99 kg
Total	Yenny Sinisterra; Colombia	193 kg	Tessy Sandi; Peru	188 kg	Karen Fernandez; Venezuela	179 kg
58 kg
Snatch	Alexandra Escobar; Ecuador	96 kg	Karool Blanco; Colombia	96 kg	María Lobón; Colombia	96 kg
Clean & Jerk	Alexandra Escobar; Ecuador	120 kg	Karool Blanco; Colombia	119 kg	María Lobón; Colombia	117 kg
Total	Alexandra Escobar; Ecuador	216 kg	Karool Blanco; Colombia	215 kg	María Lobón; Colombia	213 kg
63 kg
Snatch	Jackelina Heredia; Colombia	99 kg	Natalia Llamosa; Colombia	97 kg	Yusleidy Figueroa; Venezuela	96 kg
Clean & Jerk	Jackelina Heredia; Colombia	124 kg	Yusleidy Figueroa; Venezuela	124 kg	Natalia Llamosa; Colombia	122 kg
Total	Jackelina Heredia; Colombia	223 kg	Yusleidy Figueroa; Venezuela	220 kg	Natalia Llamosa; Colombia	219 kg
69 kg
Snatch	Mercedes Pérez; Colombia	105 kg	Miyareth Mendoza; Colombia	103 kg	Yadira Nazareno; Ecuador	93 kg
Clean & Jerk	Mercedes Pérez; Colombia	132 kg	Miyareth Mendoza; Colombia	129 kg	Joana Palacios; Argentina	106 kg
Total	Mercedes Pérez; Colombia	237 kg	Miyareth Mendoza; Colombia	232 kg	Yadira Nazareno; Ecuador	198 kg
75 kg
Snatch	Neisi Dájomes; Ecuador	113 kg	Tamara Salazar; Ecuador	102 kg	Dayana Chirinos; Venezuela	101 kg
Clean & Jerk	Neisi Dájomes; Ecuador	136 kg	Tamara Salazar; Ecuador	131 kg	Dayana Chirinos; Venezuela	130 kg
Total	Neisi Dájomes; Ecuador	249 kg	Tamara Salazar; Ecuador	233 kg	Dayana Chirinos; Venezuela	231 kg
90 kg
Snatch	María Fernanda Valdés; Chile	110 kg	Oliba Nieve; Ecuador	109 kg	Naryury Pérez; Venezuela	103 kg
Clean & Jerk	María Fernanda Valdés; Chile	140 kg	Oliba Nieve; Ecuador	135 kg	Naryury Pérez; Venezuela	130 kg
Total	María Fernanda Valdés; Chile	250 kg	Oliba Nieve; Ecuador	244 kg	Naryury Pérez; Venezuela	233 kg
+90 kg
Snatch	Yaniuska Espinosa; Venezuela	115 kg	Mirufai Morillo; Venezuela	99 kg	Nicol Matamala; Chile	98 kg
Clean & Jerk	Yaniuska Espinosa; Venezuela	140 kg	Mirufai Morillo; Venezuela	119 kg	Nicol Matamala; Chile	118 kg
Total	Yaniuska Espinosa; Venezuela	255 kg	Mirufai Morillo; Venezuela	218 kg	Nicol Matamala; Chile	216 kg

== Medal table ==
Ranking by Big (Total result) medals

Rank	Nation	Gold	Silver	Bronze	Total
1	Colombia (COL)	6	6	2	14
2	Venezuela (VEN)	4	3	4	11
3	Ecuador (ECU)	4	3	3	10
4	Chile (CHI)	2	0	2	4
5	Peru (PER)	0	2	2	4
6	Brazil (BRA)	0	1	2	3
7	Aruba (ARU)	0	1	0	1
8	Argentina (ARG)	0	0	1	1
Totals (8 entries)		16	16	16	48
