= Brayan Rodallegas =

Colombian weightlifter (born 1997)

Personal information
- Nationality: Colombian
- Born: Brayan Santiago Rodallegas Carvajal; November 15, 1997 (age 28) Villavicencio, Colombia
- Weight: 80.80 kg (178 lb)

Sport
- Country: Colombia
- Sport: Weightlifting
- Events: 81 kg; 89 kg; 96 kg
- Club: Bogota
- Coached by: Oswaldo Pinilla

Achievements and titles
- Personal bests: Snatch: 172 kg (2022); Clean & Jerk: 211 kg (2022); Total: 382 kg (2022)
Medal record
Representing Colombia
Men's weightlifting
World Championships
Silver medal – second place	2022 Bogotá	89 kg
Bronze medal – third place	2019 Pattaya	81 kg
Pan American Games
Gold medal – first place	2019 Lima	81 kg
Pan American Championships
Gold medal – first place	2019 Guatemala City	81 kg
Gold medal – first place	2020 Santo Domingo	81 kg
Gold medal – first place	2021 Guayaquil	81 kg
Gold medal – first place	2022 Bogotá	89 kg
Silver medal – second place	2018 Santo Domingo	85 kg
Bronze medal – third place	2017 Miami	77 kg
South American Games
Silver medal – second place	2018 Cochabamba	94 kg
Silver medal – second place	2022 Asunción	96 kg
Bolivarian Games
Gold medal – first place	2017 Santa Marta	77 kg S
Gold medal – first place	2022 Valledupar	89 kg S
Gold medal – first place	2022 Valledupar	89 kg CJ
Silver medal – second place	2017 Santa Marta	77 kg CJ
Silver medal – second place	2017 Santa Marta	77 kg
Junior World Championships
Bronze medal – third place	2016 Tbilisi	77 kg
South American Youth Games
Gold medal – first place	2013 Lima	77 kg

Brayan Santiago Rodallegas Carvajal (born 15 November 1997) is a Colombian weightlifter, Pan American Champion and Pan American Games Champion competing in the 77 kg and 85 kg categories until 2018 and 89 kg and 81 kg starting in 2018 after the International Weightlifting Federation reorganized the categories.

== Career ==
In 2019, he competed at the Pan American Weightlifting Championships in the 81 kg category. He swept gold medals in all lifts, setting Pan American Records in each. Later in 2019 he competed at the 2019 Pan American Games in the 81 kg category, winning a gold medal and setting two Pan American Records in the snatch, with successful lifts of 163 kg and 167 kg.

In 2021, he competed at the 2020 Summer Olympics in the 81 kg.

He won the gold medal in his event at the 2022 Pan American Weightlifting Championships held in Bogotá, Colombia. He also set new Panamerican records in the Snatch, the Clean & Jerk and Total results.

He won the silver medal in the men's 96 kg event at the 2022 South American Games held in Asunción, Paraguay. He won the silver medal in the men's 89 kg event at the 2022 World Weightlifting Championships held in Bogotá, Colombia.

== Achievements ==
Year	Venue	Weight	Snatch (kg)				Clean & Jerk (kg)				Total	Rank
Year	Venue	Weight	1	2	3	Rank	1	2	3	Rank	Total	Rank
Representing Colombia
Olympic Games
2020	Tokyo, Japan	81 kg	163	~~168~~	~~168~~	5	~~195~~	196	~~200~~	5	359	5
World Championships
2017	Anaheim, United States	77 kg	150	~~155~~	~~156~~	9	182	187	~~193~~	10	337	10
2018	Ashgabat, Turkmenistan	89 kg	~~160~~	160	167	5	193	196	203	4	370	4
2019	Pattaya, Thailand	81 kg	159	~~165~~	167	4	196	~~202~~	~~203~~	6	363	3rd place, bronze medalist(s)
2021	Tashkent, Uzbekistan	81 kg	~~158~~	158	162	5	191	195	~~200~~	6	357	5
2022	Bogotá, Colombia	89 kg	~~170~~	170	~~174~~	3rd place, bronze medalist(s)	205	211	~~216~~	3rd place, bronze medalist(s)	381	2nd place, silver medalist(s)
2023	Riyadh, Saudi Arabia	89 kg	—	—	—	—N/a	—	—	—	—N/a	—N/a	—N/a
Pan American Games
2019	Lima, Peru	81 kg	157	163	167	1	191	196	~~207~~	2	363	1st place, gold medalist(s)
Pan American Championships
2017	Miami, United States	77 kg	146	150	152	2nd place, silver medalist(s)	179	~~186~~	~~187~~	5	331	3rd place, bronze medalist(s)
2018	Santo Domingo, Dominican Republic	85 kg	155	161	166	2nd place, silver medalist(s)	193	~~198~~	201	2nd place, silver medalist(s)	367	2nd place, silver medalist(s)
2019	Guatemala City, Guatemala	81 kg	~~161~~	161	~~168~~	1st place, gold medalist(s)	190	196	202	1st place, gold medalist(s)	363	1st place, gold medalist(s)
2020	Santo Domingo, Dominican Republic	81 kg	158	163	168 AM	1st place, gold medalist(s)	195	~~200~~	~~200~~	2nd place, silver medalist(s)	363	1st place, gold medalist(s)
2021	Guayaquil, Ecuador	81 kg	153	160	--	1st place, gold medalist(s)	~~187~~	187	--	1st place, gold medalist(s)	347	1st place, gold medalist(s)
2022	Bogotá, Colombia	89 kg	168	172 AM	~~178~~	1st place, gold medalist(s)	203	~~207~~	210 AM	1st place, gold medalist(s)	382 AM	1st place, gold medalist(s)
South American Games
2018	Cochabamba, Bolivia	94 kg	159	164	~~170~~	—N/a	192	198	~~202~~	—N/a	362	2nd place, silver medalist(s)
2022	Asunción, Paraguay	96 kg	~~165~~	165	~~175~~	—N/a	195	~~215~~	—	—N/a	360	2nd place, silver medalist(s)
Bolivarian Games
2017	Santa Marta, Colombia	77 kg	150	153	155	1st place, gold medalist(s)	185	~~191~~	—	2nd place, silver medalist(s)	340	2nd place, silver medalist(s)
2022	Valledupar, Colombia	89 kg	~~155~~	155	170	1st place, gold medalist(s)	190	205	—	1st place, gold medalist(s)	—N/a	—N/a
Junior World Championships
2016	Tbilisi, Georgia	77 kg	147	~~151~~	151	3rd place, bronze medalist(s)	180	~~184~~	~~184~~	5	331	3rd place, bronze medalist(s)
2017	Tokyo, Japan	77 kg	~~152~~	~~152~~	152	6	~~181~~	181	~~187~~	5	333	5
Youth World Championships
2013	Tashkent, Uzbekistan	77 kg	~~113~~	113	116	15	~~135~~	135	~~140~~	22	251	19
