= Kevin Wormald =

Chilean weightlifter (born 1996)

Medal record

Men's Weightlifting

Representing Chile

Juegos Deportivos Nacionales
Gold medal – first place	III Juegos Nacionales	Snatch -93 kg
Gold medal – first place	III Juegos Nacionales	C&J -93 kg
Gold medal – first place	III Juegos Nacionales	Total -93 kg

Juegos Sudamericanos
Bronze medal – third place	2018 South American Games	-85kg

Kevin Wormald (Alto Hospicio, Iquique, 1996), is a Chilean weightlifter who currently competes in the -85 kg and -93 kg category. He started competing in 2010, being the 5th best athlete nationwide in the -56 kg category and under the tutelage of prominent lifter Cristián Escalante.

In May 2017 he played the National Games in Biobío with 92 kilos of weight and achieved the three gold medals in his category.

Despite his triumph, halfway through the year, a bad result at the Miami World Cup discouraged him and he stopped training until the month of January of the following year, when he began his preparation for the 2018 South American Games in Cochabamba, Bolivia, where he won the bronze medal and shared a podium with the also Chilean Arley Méndez.
