= 2017 World Weightlifting Championships – Men's 85 kg =

The Men's 85 kg competition at the 2017 World Weightlifting Championships was held on 3 December 2017.

== Schedule ==
Date	Time	Event
2 December 2017	08:55	Group C
2 December 2017	17:55	Group B
3 December 2017	11:55	Group A

== Medalists ==
Event	Gold		Silver		Bronze	
Snatch	Arley Méndez (CHI)	175 kg	Kianoush Rostami (IRI)	174 kg	Antonino Pizzolato (ITA)	162 kg
Clean & Jerk	Arley Méndez (CHI)	203 kg	Krzysztof Zwarycz (POL)	197 kg	Romain Imadouchène (FRA)	196 kg
Total	Arley Méndez (CHI)	378 kg	Krzysztof Zwarycz (POL)	359 kg	Antonino Pizzolato (ITA)	358 kg

== Records ==
Prior to this competition, the existing world records were as follows.

World Record	Snatch	Andrei Rybakou (BLR)	187 kg	Chiang Mai, Thailand	22 September 2007
World Record	Clean & Jerk	Kianoush Rostami (IRI)	220 kg	Tehran, Iran	31 May 2016
World Record	Total	Kianoush Rostami (IRI)	396 kg	Rio de Janeiro, Brazil	12 August 2016

== Results ==
Rank	Athlete	Group	Snatch (kg)				Clean & Jerk (kg)				Total
Rank	Athlete	Group	1	2	3	Rank	1	2	3	Rank	Total
1st place, gold medalist(s)	Arley Méndez (CHI)	A	163	171	175	1st place, gold medalist(s)	203	~~214~~	~~221~~	1st place, gold medalist(s)	378
2nd place, silver medalist(s)	Krzysztof Zwarycz (POL)	A	158	~~162~~	162	4	194	197	~~202~~	2nd place, silver medalist(s)	359
3rd place, bronze medalist(s)	Antonino Pizzolato (ITA)	A	155	159	162	3rd place, bronze medalist(s)	~~195~~	~~196~~	196	4	358
4	Yu Dong-ju (KOR)	A	158	~~162~~	~~163~~	6	~~194~~	194	~~200~~	5	352
5	Revaz Davitadze (GEO)	A	~~160~~	~~160~~	160	5	182	~~190~~	191	11	351
6	Romain Imadouchène (FRA)	A	153	~~157~~	~~157~~	8	191	196	~~202~~	3rd place, bronze medalist(s)	349
7	Ali Miri (IRI)	A	~~155~~	~~155~~	155	7	193	~~201~~	~~201~~	6	348
8	Tom Schwarzbach (GER)	A	151	~~154~~	~~154~~	11	190	~~194~~	~~194~~	12	341
9	Ragala Venkat Rahul (IND)	B	150	~~154~~	~~157~~	12	187	191	—	9	341
10	Toshiki Yamamoto (JPN)	A	148	~~153~~	~~153~~	14	~~192~~	193	~~202~~	7	341
11	Karol Samko (SVK)	B	140	143	146	15	188	192	~~196~~	8	338
12	Brandon Vautard (FRA)	B	141	145	~~148~~	18	~~186~~	186	191	10	336
13	Diego Betancur (COL)	B	~~150~~	150	~~155~~	13	185	~~191~~	~~192~~	13	335
14	Alex Bellemarre (CAN)	C	145	149	153	9	172	175	~~182~~	19	328
15	Amar Musić (CRO)	B	145	~~148~~	~~148~~	16	181	~~185~~	~~187~~	14	326
16	Khalil Al-Hamqan (KSA)	B	144	~~148~~	~~149~~	21	~~178~~	~~178~~	178	15	322
17	Josué Ferreira (BRA)	B	~~145~~	145	~~152~~	19	170	~~180~~	~~180~~	20	315
18	Welisson Silva (BRA)	C	~~140~~	~~140~~	140	22	170	175	~~180~~	17	315
19	Phacharamethi Tharaphan (THA)	C	135	~~139~~	~~140~~	27	~~176~~	176	~~181~~	16	311
20	Daniel Chertkov (ISR)	C	135	~~140~~	~~140~~	25	170	175	~~180~~	18	310
21	Christian Amoah (GHA)	C	132	136	139	23	165	169	~~173~~	26	308
22	Donald Nkoh (CMR)	C	135	~~143~~	~~143~~	24	170	~~175~~	~~175~~	21	305
23	Mathieu Marineau (CAN)	C	135	~~139~~	~~140~~	26	170	~~175~~	~~180~~	23	305
24	Roger Myrholt (NOR)	C	127	131	134	28	165	170	~~175~~	25	304
25	Hoàng Tấn Tài (VIE)	C	130	~~137~~	~~140~~	29	170	~~178~~	~~178~~	22	300
—	Kianoush Rostami (IRI)	A	170	~~174~~	174	2nd place, silver medalist(s)	~~212~~	~~212~~	~~215~~	—	—
—	Jhor Moreno (COL)	A	152	~~156~~	~~156~~	10	~~190~~	~~190~~	~~190~~	—	—
—	Krenar Shoraj (ALB)	B	145	~~150~~	~~152~~	17	—	—	—	—	—
—	Seán Brown (IRL)	C	137	142	145	20	~~166~~	~~170~~	~~170~~	—	—
—	Michael Müller (GER)	B	—	—	—	—	—	—	—	—	—
—	Daýanç Aşyrow (TKM)	B	—	—	—	—	—	—	—	—	—
—	Ulugbek Alimov (UZB)	A	—	—	—	—	—	—	—	—	—
—	Banyat Tawnok (THA)	B	~~150~~	~~150~~	~~150~~	—	170	~~179~~	~~179~~	24	—
