= Andranik Karapetyan =

Armenian weightlifter (born 1995)

Personal information
- Born: December 15, 1995 (age 30) Vagharshapat, Armenia
- Height: 167 cm (5 ft 6 in)
- Weight: 89 kg (196 lb)

Sport
- Country: Armenia until 2025, Bosnia and Herzegovina 2025-
- Sport: Weightlifting
- Event: 77 kg
Medal record
Men's weightlifting
Representing Armenia
World Championships
Bronze medal – third place	2015 Houston	77 kg
European Championships
Gold medal – first place	2016 Forde	77 kg
Silver medal – second place	2023 Yerevan	89 kg
Bronze medal – third place	2015 Tbilisi	77 kg
Bronze medal – third place	2021 Moscow	89 kg
Summer Universiade
Silver medal – second place	2017 Taipei	85 kg
Representing Bosnia and Herzegovina
European Championships
Bronze medal – third place	2026 Batumi	88 kg

Andranik Karapetyan (Armenian: Անդրանիկ Կարապետյան; born December 15, 1995, in Vagharshapat, Armenia), is an Armenian weightlifter. He was selected to compete for Armenia at the 2024 Summer Olympics in Weightlifting, the men's -89 kg. As of 2025, Karapetyan represents Bosnia and Herzegovina.

== Biography ==
Karapetyan won a gold medal at the 2016 European Weightlifting Championships snatching 170 kg and clean and jerking 197 kg, setting 367 kg for total.

He competed in 2015 World Weightlifting Championships and came 4th in total, but following disqualification of North Korean weightlifter Kim Kwang-song Karapetyan received the bronze medal in total (363 kg).

Karapetyan failed to place in the 2016 Summer Olympics when he dislocated his left elbow while performing the clean and jerk.

In August 2024, Karapetyan competed in the men's 89 kg event at the 2024 Summer Olympics held in Paris, France. He lifted 370 kg in total and placed seventh.

In 2026 he won Bosnia and Herzegovina’s first-ever medal in weightlifting at the European Championships.

== Major results ==
Year	Venue	Weight	Snatch (kg)				Clean & Jerk (kg)				Total	Rank
Year	Venue	Weight	1	2	3	Rank	1	2	3	Rank	Total	Rank
Representing Armenia
Olympic Games
2016	Rio de Janeiro, Brazil	77 kg	170	174	~~176~~	—N/a	~~195~~	~~195~~	—	—N/a	DNF	—
2024	Paris, France	89 kg	170	~~175~~	~~177~~	—N/a	200	~~210~~	~~215~~	—N/a	370	7
World Championships
2015	Houston, United States	77 kg	164	~~167~~	167	2nd place, silver medalist(s)	~~191~~	191	196	3rd place, bronze medalist(s)	363	3rd place, bronze medalist(s)
2018	Ashgabat, Turkmenistan	81 kg	~~171~~	~~171~~	~~171~~	—	—	—	—	—	—	—
2019	Pattaya, Thailand	81 kg	168	~~172~~	~~172~~	3rd place, bronze medalist(s)	~~195~~	~~195~~	~~195~~	—	—	—
2021	Tashkent, Uzbekistan	89 kg	167	172	175	1st place, gold medalist(s)	~~196~~	~~196~~	~~196~~	—	—	—
2022	Bogotá, Colombia	89 kg	166	~~172~~	~~174~~	5	~~186~~	186	~~191~~	19	352	12
2023	Riyadh, Saudi Arabia	89 kg	~~170~~	170	175	1st place, gold medalist(s)	192	202	~~207~~	5	377	4
IWF World Cup
2024	Phuket, Thailand	89 kg	~~170~~	~~171~~	~~175~~	—	—	—	—	—	—	—
European Championships
2013	Tirana, Albania	77 kg	153	157	160	—	180	~~185~~	186	—	DSQ	—
2015	Tbilisi, Georgia	77 kg	156	161	164	1st place, gold medalist(s)	~~186~~	186	~~193~~	4	350	3rd place, bronze medalist(s)
2016	Førde, Norway	77 kg	165	170	~~174~~	1st place, gold medalist(s)	192	197	~~200~~	1st place, gold medalist(s)	367	1st place, gold medalist(s)
2017	Split, Croatia	85 kg	145	155	160	4	155	165	~~175~~	18	325	12
2021	Moscow, Russia	89 kg	165	170	~~175~~	3rd place, bronze medalist(s)	195	~~200~~	~~205~~	6	365	3rd place, bronze medalist(s)
2022	Tirana, Albania	89 kg	168	174	~~178~~	2nd place, silver medalist(s)	191	~~196~~	~~196~~	5	365	5
2023	Yerevan, Armenia	89 kg	167	173	178 ER	1st place, gold medalist(s)	190	196	~~206~~	5	374	2nd place, silver medalist(s)
2024	Sofia, Bulgaria	89 kg	170	~~175~~	~~175~~	4	195	~~204~~	~~204~~	7	365	5
Representing Bosnia and Herzegovina
European Championships
2026	Batumi, Georgia	88 kg	163	~~167~~	167	2nd place, silver medalist(s)	182	190	194	8	361	3rd place, bronze medalist(s)
