= Lü Xiaojun =

Chinese Olympic weightlifting champion

Lü Xiaojun (吕小军)
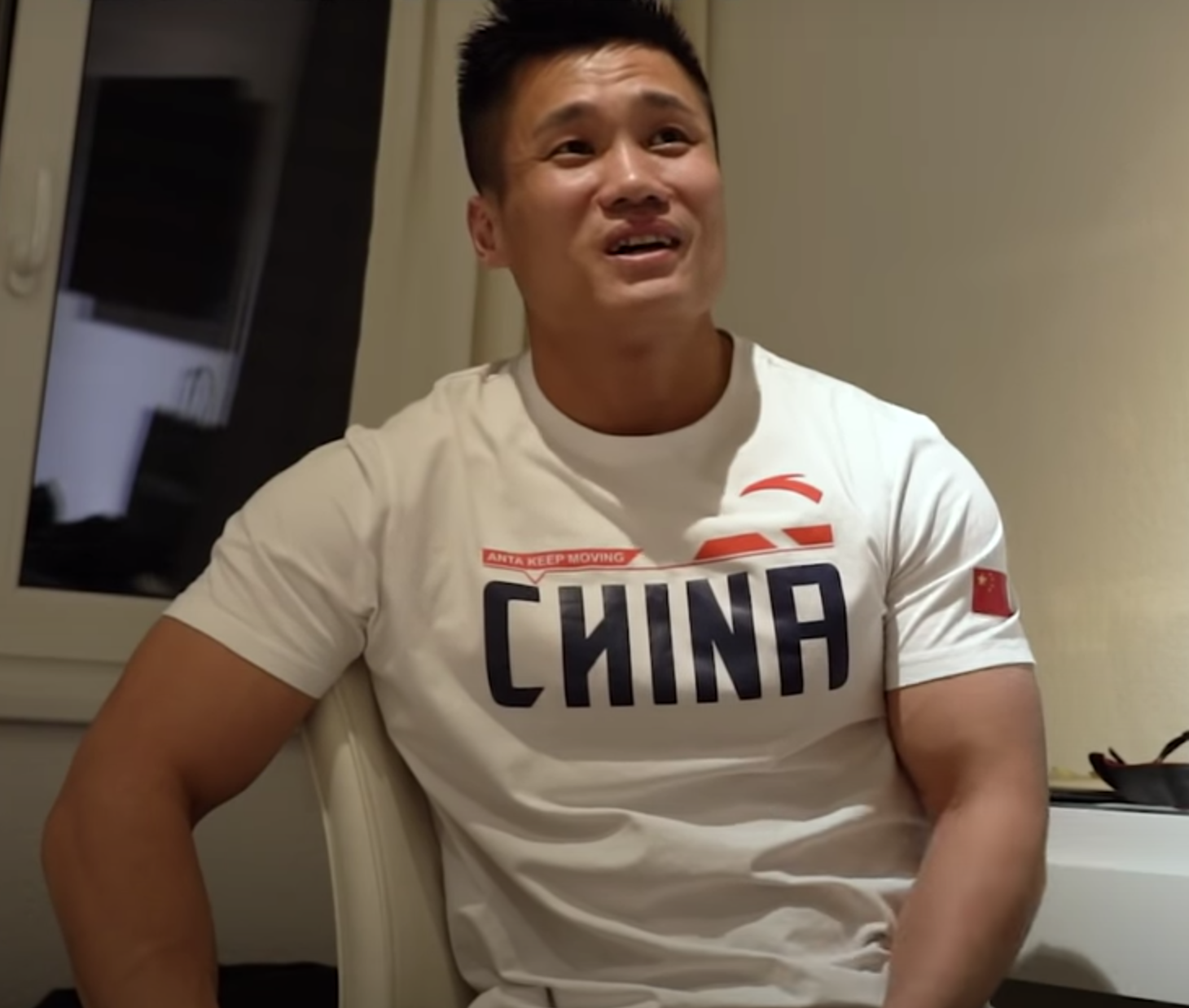
- Lü in 2019

Personal information
- Nationality: Chinese
- Born: 27 July 1984 (age 42) Qianjiang, Hubei, China
- Height: 1.72 m (5 ft 8 in)
- Weight: 80.75 kg (178 lb)

Sport
- Country: China
- Sport: Weightlifting
- Event: –81 kg
- Club: Tianjin
- Coached by: Yu Jie

Achievements and titles
- Personal bests: Snatch: 177 kg (2016, WR); Clean and jerk: 207 kg (2019); Total: 380 kg (2013, WR)
Medal record
Representing China
Olympic Games
Gold medal – first place	2020 Tokyo	–81 kg
Silver medal – second place	2016 Rio de Janeiro	–77 kg
Gold medal – first place	2012 London	–77 kg
World Championships
Gold medal – first place	2009 Goyang	–77 kg
Gold medal – first place	2011 Paris	–77 kg
Gold medal – first place	2013 Wrocław	–77 kg
Gold medal – first place	2018 Ashgabat	–81 kg
Gold medal – first place	2019 Pattaya	–81 kg
Silver medal – second place	2010 Antalya	–77 kg
Asian Games
Gold medal – first place	2014 Incheon	–77 kg
Asian Championships
Gold medal – first place	2011 Tongling	–77 kg
Gold medal – first place	2020 Tashkent	–81 kg
Silver medal – second place	2008 Kanazawa	–77 kg
Junior World Championships
Gold medal – first place	2004 Minsk	–69 kg
National Games of China
Gold medal – first place	2013 Liaoning	–77 kg
Gold medal – first place	2017 Tianjin	–77 kg
Silver medal – second place	2009 Shandong	–77 kg

Lü Xiaojun
- Simplified Chinese: 吕小军
- Traditional Chinese: 呂小軍
Transcriptions
Standard Mandarin
- Hanyu Pinyin: Lǚ Xiǎojūn
- IPA: [lỳ ɕjàʊtɕýn]

Lü Xiaojun (Chinese: 吕小军; pinyin: Lǚ Xiǎojūn, born 27 July 1984) is a Chinese weightlifter. He is a three-time Olympic champion and five-time world champion competing in the 77 kg category until 2018 and 81 kg starting in 2018 after the International Weightlifting Federation reorganized the categories.

== Early life ==
Lü was born in a village administered by Qianjiang City, Hubei Province. His father, Lü Yuan, and the rest of his family were impoverished peasants. Contrary to popular belief, Lu's athletic career started out as a short-distance track and field sprinter and he didn't begin specific weightlifting training until he was 14. After winning a local elementary school track and field meet at the age of 12, he was scouted by the county-level track and field coaches and asked to join the team. But Lu led a rather short career as a young sprinter. At a 200 metre meet where he was placed 6th in 1998, Lu was scouted by his first weightlifting coach Deng Minghu who noted that Lu, though lacking endurance for short-distance sprinting, was extremely explosive and powerful out of the block and in the early part of the race, in addition to having a favorable physique for the sport of weightlifting. Lu, who was already 14 at this point, was then invited by Deng to join the Qian Jiang city youth athletic school to start training as a weightlifter. In 1999, to remove the financial burden on Lü's family, his coach Dengling Hu sent him to join the provincial team.

== Weightlifting career ==
In 2003 Lü represented the Hubei provincial team in the Chinese national weightlifting championships, competing at 69 kg. He won the bronze total for his class. The same year, due to his outstanding performance, he was recruited by the Chinese national team. In 2006 due to ligament injuries in his shoulders and legs, he left the national team. In 2008, after the 2008 Summer Olympics, Lü renewed his training in the national team with coach Yu Jie.

He has set thirteen senior world records throughout the course of his career, seven at –77 kg and six at –81 kg.

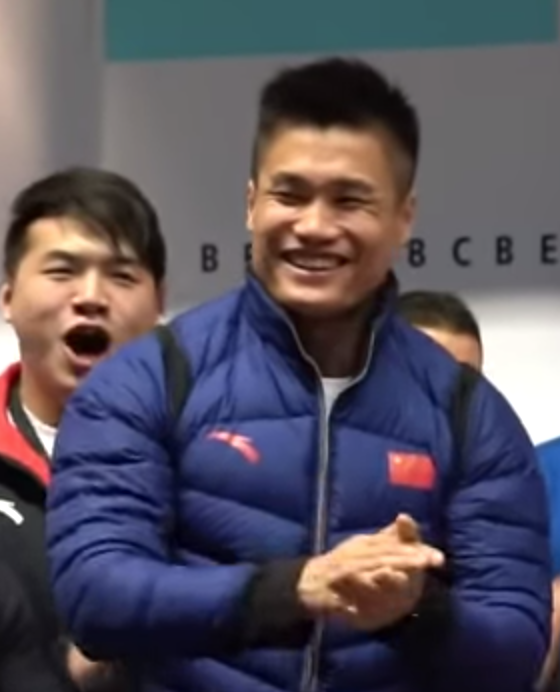
Lu Xiaojun in Switzerland, 2019

=== Olympics ===
Heading into the 2012 Summer Olympics Lü was the heavy favorite to win. He ended up winning the gold medal at the 2012 Summer Olympics in the 77 kg class with a total of 379 kg. His snatch of 175 kg set both a world and Olympic record, as did his total of 379 kg, for the 77 kg class. Lü wanted to attempt his third lift in the snatch at 177 kg, but ran out of time.

He was again the heavy favorite to win gold at the 2016 Summer Olympics. He finished the snatch phase with a new world record of 177 kg, but did not win gold due to Nijat Rahimov's clean and jerk world record of 214 kg. Lü and Rahimov had the same total, but Rahimov won due to virtue of a lighter body weight. However, due to the doping offences of Rahimov, the gold medal was stripped and Rahimov was disqualified in March 2022. As of July 2024, the medals have not yet been re-allocated and will not be until final rulings by the IOC have been issued.

At the 2020 Summer Olympics, Lü dominated the newly established men's 81 kg weightlifting competition by lifting 170 kg and 204 kg in the snatch and clean & jerk phases respectively for a total of 374 kg to win the gold medal. By winning this title, Lü became the oldest weightlifting champion in the history of modern Olympic Games at 37 (he cannot have been 37 he was born in 1984).

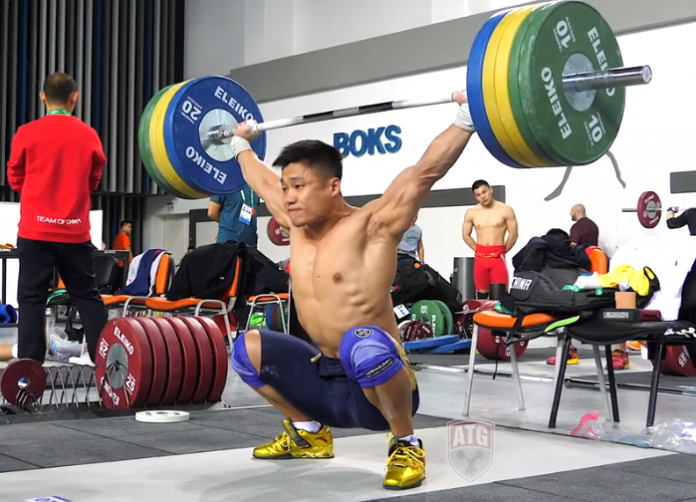
Lu at the 2018 World Weightlifting Championships

=== World Championships ===
In 2009 he won his first World Weightlifting Championships where he set new Snatch and Total world records. Looking to repeat in 2010 he ended up being the silver medalist, but returned in 2011 to win gold for the second time.

Lü won 3 gold medals in the 77 kg class at the 2013 World Weightlifting Championships. He broke his own world record in the snatch with a lift of 176 kg. He also completed a 204 kg clean and jerk, setting a new world record total of 380 kg.

At the 2015 World Weightlifting Championships he won the gold medal in the snatch, but was unable to complete a clean and jerk which eliminated him from winning a fourth world championship.

In 2018 the International Weightlifting Federation updated the weight classes, and he competed in the newly created 81 kg division. The 81 kg division saw 5 world records set and 11 junior world records set. In the snatch portion, Lü initially set the snatch world record of 172 kg, then Mohamed Ihab in his next attempt lifted 173 kg setting a new world record. In the clean & jerk portion, Mohamed Ihab set 2 new world records in the total with his first two lifts, but he was unable to lift his final clean & jerk of 203 kg. This allowed Lu to win gold with his 202 kg clean & jerk, setting a new world record total of 374 kg, out lifting Mohamed Ihab by 1 kg.

In the 2019 Championships held in Thailand, Lu again won gold in the 81 kg category, setting a new world record of 378 kg total (171 kg snatch and 207 kg clean & jerk).

Lu did not compete in the 2022 World Weightlifting Championships held in December 2022, which was won by his compatriot Li Dayin.

=== Doping ban ===
In December 2022, it was revealed that Lu had tested positive during an out-of-competition testing for the use of blood booster hormone EPO in a blood sample collected on 30 October 2022. Lu denied taking any prohibited substance and can request that a backup sample B be tested. Lu has been provisionally suspended until the issue is resolved.

== Personal life ==
Lü married his long-term girlfriend Guo Xiyan, a former world class weightlifter herself, in December 2013. They have three children, with the youngest born in December 2023.

== Major results ==
Year	Venue	Weight	Snatch (kg)				Clean & Jerk (kg)				Total	Rank
Year	Venue	Weight	1	2	3	Rank	1	2	3	Rank	Total	Rank
Olympic Games
2012	(United Kingdom) London, England	77 kg	170	175 WR	~~177~~	1	195	~~204~~	204	1	379 WR	1st place, gold medalist(s)
2016	Rio de Janeiro, Brazil	77 kg	170	175	177 WR	1	~~197~~	197	202	2	379	2nd place, silver medalist(s)
2021	Tokyo, Japan	81 kg	~~165~~	165	170 OR	1	197	204 OR	~~210~~	1	374 OR	1st place, gold medalist(s)
World Championships
2009	Goyang, South Korea	77 kg	165	170	174 WR	1st place, gold medalist(s)	200	204	~~211~~	1st place, gold medalist(s)	378 WR	1st place, gold medalist(s)
2010	Antalya, Turkey	77 kg	165	170	~~175~~	2nd place, silver medalist(s)	200	~~206~~	~~206~~	1st place, gold medalist(s)	370	2nd place, silver medalist(s)
2011	Paris, France	77 kg	165	~~170~~	170	1st place, gold medalist(s)	200	205	~~211~~	2nd place, silver medalist(s)	375	1st place, gold medalist(s)
2013	Wrocław, Poland	77 kg	160	170	176 WR	1st place, gold medalist(s)	196	204	–	1st place, gold medalist(s)	380 WR	1st place, gold medalist(s)
2015	Houston, United States	77 kg	170	175	~~177~~	1st place, gold medalist(s)	~~201~~	~~201~~	~~201~~	–	–	–
2018	Ashgabat, Turkmenistan	81 kg	165	~~170~~	172 WR	2nd place, silver medalist(s)	197	202	~~205~~	2nd place, silver medalist(s)	374 WR	1st place, gold medalist(s)
2019	Pattaya, Thailand	81 kg	~~165~~	165	171	1st place, gold medalist(s)	191	205	207 WR	1st place, gold medalist(s)	378 CWR	1st place, gold medalist(s)
Asian Games
2014	Incheon, South Korea	77 kg	165	170	175	1	~~200~~	~~200~~	200	1	375	1st place, gold medalist(s)
Asian Championships
2008	Kanazawa, Japan	77 kg	158	~~163~~	~~163~~	1st place, gold medalist(s)	~~188~~	188	~~192~~	2nd place, silver medalist(s)	346	2nd place, silver medalist(s)
2011	Tongling, China	77 kg	160	~~165~~	~~165~~	1st place, gold medalist(s)	~~190~~	192	192	1st place, gold medalist(s)	352	1st place, gold medalist(s)
2020	Tashkent, Uzbekistan	81 kg	~~165~~	170	174 WR	2nd place, silver medalist(s)	199	~~208~~	~~208~~	1st place, gold medalist(s)	373	1st place, gold medalist(s)

- WR: World record
- OR: Olympic record
