= Marcos Rojas =

Peruvian weightlifter (born 1995)

Personal information
- Full name: Marcos Antonio Rojas Concha
- Born: 2 June 1995 (age 31) Moyobamba, Peru

Sport
- Country: Peru
- Sport: Weightlifting
Medal record
Men's weightlifting
Representing Peru
South American Games
Bronze medal – third place	2018 Cochabamba	56 kg

Marcos Antonio Rojas Concha (born 2 June 1995) is a Peruvian weightlifter. In 2021, he competed in the men's 61 kg event at the 2020 Summer Olympics in Tokyo, Japan.

He competed in the men's 56 kg at the 2017 World Weightlifting Championships held in Anaheim, United States. In 2018, he won the bronze medal in the men's 56 kg event at the 2018 South American Games held in Cochabamba, Bolivia.

In 2019, he finished in 7th place in the men's 61 kg event at the Pan American Games held in Lima, Peru. A few months later, he also competed in the men's 61 kg event at the 2019 World Weightlifting Championships held in Pattaya, Thailand.
