= Weightlifting at the 2020 Summer Olympics =

Weightlifting at the Games of the XXXII Olympiad
- Venue: Tokyo International Forum
- Dates: 24 July – 4 August 2021
- No. of events: 14
- Competitors: 196 from 74 nations

The weightlifting competition at the 2020 Summer Olympics in Tokyo took place from 24 July to 4 August 2021 at the Tokyo International Forum.

== Competition schedule ==
Schedule
Date	Jul 24	Jul 25	Jul 26	Jul 27	Jul 28	Jul 29	Jul 30	July 31	Aug 1	Aug 2	Aug 3	Aug 4
Men's 61kg		F										
Men's 67kg		F										
Men's 73kg					F							
Men's 81kg								F				
Men's 96kg								F				
Men's 109kg											F	
Men's 109+kg												F
Women's 49kg	F											
Women's 55kg			F									
Women's 59kg				F								
Women's 64kg				F								
Women's 76kg									F			
Women's 87kg										F		
Women's 87+kg										F		

== Qualification ==
The number of weightlifters at these Games was reduced to 196, down from 260 in the 2016 Summer Olympics.

Furthermore, many countries had reduced squads, and four were excluded from weightlifting at these Games due to punishments given as a result of high numbers of historic doping offenses.

== Changes ==
The total gold medal count was reduced from 15 to 14, with one men's event being eliminated.

In July 2018, IWF announced new official weight categories.

== Participating nations ==
- Albania (2)
- Algeria (1)
- American Samoa (1)
- Armenia (2)
- Australia (5)
- Austria (2)
- Belarus (2)
- Belgium (2)
- Botswana (1)
- Brazil (2)
- Bulgaria (2)
- Cameroon (2)
- Canada (5)
- Chile (2)
- China (8)
- Colombia (3)
- Cuba (4)
- Czech Republic (1)
- Dominican Republic (5)
- Ecuador (4)
- France (4)
- Georgia (4)
- Germany (3)
- Ghana (1)
- Great Britain (4)
- Greece (1)
- Hungary (1)
- India (1)
- Indonesia (5)
- Iran (2)
- Israel (1)
- Italy (4)
- Japan (7)
- Kazakhstan (2)
- Kyrgyzstan (1)
- Latvia (2)
- Lebanon (1)
- Lithuania (1)
- Madagascar (2)
- Malta (1)
- Mauritius (1)
- Mexico (4)
- Moldova (1)
- Mongolia (1)
- Morocco (1)
- Nauru (1)
- Netherlands (1)
- New Zealand (5)
- Nicaragua (1)
- Oman (1)
- Pakistan (1)
- Palestine (1)
- Papua New Guinea (2)
- Peru (1)
- Philippines (2)
- Poland (3)
- Refugee Olympic Team (1)
- ROC (2)
- Saudi Arabia (1)
- Solomon Islands (1)
- South Korea (8)
- Spain (4)
- Sweden (1)
- Syria (1)
- Chinese Taipei (7)
- Tonga (1)
- Tunisia (5)
- Turkey (2)
- Turkmenistan (5)
- Ukraine (2)
- United States (8)
- Uzbekistan (4)
- Venezuela (4)
- Vietnam (2)

== Medalists ==
=== Medal table ===
* Host nation (Japan)

Rank	Nation	Gold	Silver	Bronze	Total
1	China	7	1	0	8
2	Ecuador	1	1	0	2
3	Chinese Taipei	1	0	1	2
3	Georgia	1	0	1	2
5	Canada	1	0	0	1
5	Philippines	1	0	0	1
5	Qatar	1	0	0	1
5	Uzbekistan	1	0	0	1
9	Venezuela	0	2	0	2
10	Indonesia	0	1	2	3
10	Italy	0	1	2	3
12	Dominican Republic	0	1	1	2
12	United States	0	1	1	2
14	Armenia	0	1	0	1
14	Colombia	0	1	0	1
14	Great Britain	0	1	0	1
14	India	0	1	0	1
14	Iran	0	1	0	1
14	Turkmenistan	0	1	0	1
20	Kazakhstan	0	0	2	2
21	Japan*	0	0	1	1
21	Latvia	0	0	1	1
21	Mexico	0	0	1	1
21	Syria	0	0	1	1
Totals (24 entries)		14	14	14	42

=== Men's ===
Event	Gold		Silver		Bronze	
61 kg	Li Fabin; China	313 kg OR	Eko Yuli Irawan; Indonesia	302 kg	Igor Son; Kazakhstan	294 kg
67 kg	Chen Lijun; China	332 kg OR	Luis Javier Mosquera; Colombia	331 kg	Mirko Zanni; Italy	322 kg
73 kg	Shi Zhiyong; China	364 kg WR	Julio Mayora; Venezuela	346 kg	Rahmat Erwin Abdullah; Indonesia	342 kg
81 kg	Lü Xiaojun; China	374 kg OR	Zacarías Bonnat; Dominican Republic	367 kg	Antonino Pizzolato; Italy	365 kg
96 kg	Fares Ibrahim; Qatar	402 kg OR	Keydomar Vallenilla; Venezuela	387 kg	Anton Pliesnoi; Georgia	387 kg
109 kg	Akbar Djuraev; Uzbekistan	430 kg OR	Simon Martirosyan; Armenia	423 kg	Artūrs Plēsnieks; Latvia	410 kg
109+ kg	Lasha Talakhadze; Georgia	488 kg WR	Ali Davoudi; Iran	441 kg	Man Asaad; Syria	424 kg

=== Women's ===
During the women's +87 competition, Laurel Hubbard made history by becoming the first transgender woman to compete in the Olympics.

Event	Gold		Silver		Bronze	
49 kg	Hou Zhihui; China	210 kg OR	Saikhom Mirabai Chanu; India	202 kg	Windy Cantika Aisah; Indonesia	194 kg
55 kg	Hidilyn Diaz; Philippines	224 kg OR	Liao Qiuyun; China	223 kg	Zulfiya Chinshanlo; Kazakhstan	213 kg
59 kg	Kuo Hsing-chun; Chinese Taipei	236 kg OR	Polina Guryeva; Turkmenistan	217 kg	Mikiko Ando; Japan	214 kg
64 kg	Maude Charron; Canada	236 kg	Giorgia Bordignon; Italy	232 kg	Chen Wen-huei; Chinese Taipei	230 kg
76 kg	Neisi Dájomes; Ecuador	263 kg	Katherine Nye; United States	249 kg	Aremi Fuentes; Mexico	245 kg
87 kg	Wang Zhouyu; China	270 kg	Tamara Salazar; Ecuador	263 kg	Crismery Santana; Dominican Republic	256 kg
87+ kg	Li Wenwen; China	320 kg OR	Emily Campbell; Great Britain	283 kg	Sarah Robles; United States	282 kg

== Controversies ==
Doping in weightlifting was highlighted during the Games due to historic problems in the sport. Due to corruption, failed reforms of the International Weightlifting Federation, and doping problems, the IOC is threatening to drop weightlifting entirely from the Olympics unless substantial reforms are made to the sport.

Laurel Hubbard became the first openly transgender woman to compete in the Olympics. Her participation in the women’s heavyweight class sparked controversy over whether natal males have biological advantages in female sport.

== See also ==
- Weightlifting at the 2018 Asian Games
- Weightlifting at the 2018 Commonwealth Games
- Weightlifting at the 2018 Summer Youth Olympics
- Weightlifting at the 2019 Pacific Games
- Weightlifting at the 2019 Pan American Games
- Powerlifting at the 2020 Summer Paralympics
