= Antonino Pizzolato =

Italian weightlifter (born 1996)

Personal information
- Nickname: Nino
- Born: 20 August 1996 (age 30) Castelvetrano, Sicily, Italy
- Weight: 89 kg (196 lb)

Sport
- Country: Italy
- Sport: Weightlifting
- Event: -89 kg
- Club: GS Fiamme Oro
- Coached by: Sebastiano Corbu

Achievements and titles
- Personal bests: Snatch: 175 kg (2022); Clean & Jerk: 217 kg (2022 CWR); Total: 392 kg (2022 CWR)
Medal record
Men's weightlifting
Representing Italy
Olympic Games
Bronze medal – third place	2020 Tokyo	–81 kg
Bronze medal – third place	2024 Paris	–89 kg
World Championships
Bronze medal – third place	2017 Anaheim	–85 kg
European Championships
Gold medal – first place	2019 Batumi	–81 kg
Gold medal – first place	2021 Moscow	–81 kg
Gold medal – first place	2022 Tirana	–89 kg
Silver medal – second place	2024 Sofia	–89 kg
Mediterranean Games
Gold medal – first place	2022 Oran	–89 kg S
Gold medal – first place	2022 Oran	–89 kg CJ
Junior World Championships
Silver medal – second place	2015 Wrocław	–85 kg
Silver medal – second place	2016 Tbilisi	–85 kg
Bronze medal – third place	2014 Kazan	–85 kg

Antonino "Nino" Pizzolato (born 20 August 1996) is an Italian weightlifter, Olympian, and three-time European Champion competing in the 85 kg category until 2018 and the 81 kg and 89 kg categories starting in 2018 after the International Weightlifting Federation reorganized the weight classes.

== Career ==
In 2019 Pizzolato competed at the 2019 European Weightlifting Championships in the 81 kg category, winning the gold medal in the Clean & Jerk and total. Later, in 2019 he competed at the 2019 World Weightlifting Championships, finishing in sixth place with a 358 kg total in the 81 kg category.

He competed at the 2020 Summer Olympics, in Men's 81 kg, winning a bronze medal.

He won the gold medal in the men's 89 kg Snatch and Clean & Jerk events at the 2022 Mediterranean Games held in Oran, Algeria.

In August 2024, Pizzolato competed in the men's 89 kg event at the 2024 Summer Olympics held in Paris, France. He lifted 384 kg in total and won his second Olympic bronze medal. Pizzolato originally failed all three attempts in Clean & Jerk but the jury overturned a unanimous no-lift decision by the referees on his final lift. Pizzolato made just four successful attempts to win two Olympic medals.

== Personal life ==
Pizzolato received a 10-month ban from competition for making threats and engaging in intimidation, bullying, and in some cases physical violence, as well as for showing pornographic videos to underage athletes at the national team training center.

In November 2024, Pizzolato went on trial for aggravated gang rape. He and his three friends raped a 27-year-old Finnish female tourist at a residence in Trapani, Italy, on 22 July 2022. On 6 July 2026, he was sentenced to five years and four months in prison.

== Major results ==
Year	Venue	Weight	Snatch (kg)				Clean & Jerk (kg)				Total	Rank
Year	Venue	Weight	1	2	3	Rank	1	2	3	Rank	Total	Rank
Olympic Games
2021	Tokyo, Japan	81 kg	~~165~~	165	~~168~~	—N/a	200	~~203~~	~~210~~	—N/a	365	3rd place, bronze medalist(s)
2024	Paris, France	89 kg	~~172~~	172	~~176~~	—N/a	~~212~~	~~212~~	212	—N/a	384	3rd place, bronze medalist(s)
World Championships
2014	Almaty, Kazakhstan	85 kg	145	150	152	25	190	~~195~~	~~195~~	22	342	24
2015	Houston, United States	85 kg	155	159	161	10	194	198	202	5	363	7
2017	Anaheim, United States	85 kg	155	159	162	3rd place, bronze medalist(s)	~~195~~	~~195~~	196	4	358	3rd place, bronze medalist(s)
2019	Pattaya, Thailand	81 kg	155	160	163	7	~~195~~	195	~~201~~	9	358	6
European Championships
2015	Tbilisi, Georgia	85 kg	151	~~155~~	155	7	191	~~196~~	~~196~~	6	346	6
2016	Førde, Norway	85 kg	157	~~161~~	~~161~~	6	197	~~202~~	~~202~~	3rd place, bronze medalist(s)	354	4
2019	Batumi, Georgia	81 kg	~~155~~	155	~~160~~	6	190	195	201	1st place, gold medalist(s)	356	1st place, gold medalist(s)
2021	Moscow, Russia	81 kg	159	162	164	1st place, gold medalist(s)	195	200	206	2nd place, silver medalist(s)	370	1st place, gold medalist(s)
2022	Tirana, Albania	89 kg	~~170~~	170	175	1st place, gold medalist(s)	210	212	217 WR	1st place, gold medalist(s)	392 WR	1st place, gold medalist(s)
World Junior Championships
2014	Kazan, Russia	85 kg	141	145	149	4	~~185~~	185	~~190~~	3rd place, bronze medalist(s)	334	3rd place, bronze medalist(s)
2015	Wrocław, Poland	85 kg	150	153	154	2nd place, silver medalist(s)	190	~~193~~	193	2nd place, silver medalist(s)	347	2nd place, silver medalist(s)
2016	Tbilisi, Georgia	85 kg	153	156	159	2nd place, silver medalist(s)	~~193~~	195	201	1st place, gold medalist(s)	360	2nd place, silver medalist(s)
