= Harrison Maurus =

American weightlifter (born 2000)

Personal information
- Nationality: United States
- Born: February 26, 2000 (age 26) Auburn, Washington
- Weight: 80.95 kg (178 lb)

Sport
- Country: United States of America
- Sport: Weightlifting
- Event: –81 kg
- Team: Power and Grace Performance
- Coached by: Spencer Arnold
Medal record
Representing United States
World Championships
Bronze medal – third place	2017 Anaheim	–77 kg
Pan American Games
Bronze medal – third place	2019 Lima	–81 kg

Harrison James Maurus (born February 26, 2000) is an American weightlifter, competing in the 77 kg category until 2018 and 81 kg starting in 2018 after the International Weightlifting Federation reorganized the categories.

== Career ==
He was the bronze medalist in the clean & jerk and total at the 2017 World Weightlifting Championships in the 77 kg category.

He represented the United States at the 2020 Summer Olympics, ranking fourth.

== Major results ==
Year	Venue	Weight	Snatch (kg)				Clean & Jerk (kg)				Total	Rank
Year	Venue	Weight	1	2	3	Rank	1	2	3	Rank	Total	Rank
World Championships
2017	Anaheim, United States	77 kg	150	155	~~159~~	5	187	193	-	3rd place, bronze medalist(s)	348	3rd place, bronze medalist(s)
2018	Ashgabat, Turkmenistan	81 kg	150	154	157	7	191	195	200	4	357	6
Pan American Games
2019	Lima, Peru	81 kg	145	150	155	3	190	195	~~198~~	3	350	3rd place, bronze medalist(s)
Olympic Games
2021	Tokyo, Japan	81 kg	153	158	161	7	195	200	~~205~~	4	361	4
