= Amur Al-Khanjari =

Omani weightlifter (born 2000)

Amur Salim Al-Khanjari
Personal information
- Citizenship: Oman
- Born: 16 October 2000 (age 25)

Sport
- Country: Oman
- Sport: Weightlifting
- Weight class: 81 kg
Medal record
Representing Oman
Men's weightlifting
Islamic Solidarity Games
Silver medal – second place	2021 Konya	89 kg C&J

Amur Salim Al-Khanjari (born 16 October 2000) is an Omani weightlifter. He represented Oman at the 2020 Summer Olympics in Tokyo, Japan.
