= Zacarías Bonnat =

Dominican weightlifter (born 1996)

Personal information
- Nationality: Dominican
- Born: 27 February 1996 (age 30) Bayaguana, Dominican Republic

Sport
- Country: Dominican Republic
- Sport: Weightlifting
- Event: –81 kg
Medal record
Representing Dominican Republic
Olympic Games
Silver medal – second place	2020 Tokyo	–81 kg
Pan American Games
Silver medal – second place	2019 Lima	–81 kg
Pan American Championships
Silver medal – second place	2019 Guatemala City	–81 kg
Silver medal – second place	2020 Santo Domingo	–81 kg
Bronze medal – third place	2022 Bogotá	–89 kg

Zacarías Bonnat Michel (born 27 February 1996) is a Dominican weightlifter. He won the silver medal in the men's 81 kg event at the 2020 Summer Olympics in Tokyo, Japan.

He won the bronze medal in the 89 kg category at the 2022 Pan American Weightlifting Championships held in Bogotá, Colombia.

In December 2022, he was provisionally suspended after testing positive for a banned substance. As a consequence, he was unable to compete at the 2022 World Weightlifting Championships in Bogotá, Colombia.
