= Arley Méndez =

Chilean weightlifter (born 1993)

Personal information
- Nationality: Chile
- Born: Arley Méndez Pérez; December 31, 1993 (age 32) San Cristóbal, Cuba
- Height: 1.69 m (5 ft 7 in)
- Weight: 81.00 kg (179 lb)

Sport
- Country: Chile
- Sport: Weightlifting
- Event: –81 kg
- Coached by: Giorgi Panchev
Medal record
Men's weightlifting
Representing Chile
World Championships
Gold medal – first place	2017 Anaheim	85 kg
Pan American Championships
Gold medal – first place	2018 Santo Domingo	85 kg
Gold medal – first place	2019 Guatemala City	89 kg
Silver medal – second place	2024 Caracas	89 kg
Bronze medal – third place	2025 Cali	88 kg

Arley Méndez Pérez (born 31 December 1993) is a Chilean weightlifter, World Champion and two-time Pan American Champion competing in the 85 kg category until 2018 and 89 kg starting in 2018 after the International Weightlifting Federation reorganized the categories.

== Career ==
He competed for Chile at the 2017 World Weightlifting Championships winning the gold medal in all three categories in the –85 kg division, ahead of the Olympic champion and heavy favorite Kianoush Rostami.

In 2018, he competed in the newly created 89 kg category at the 2018 World Weightlifting Championships in Ashgabat winning a gold medal in the Snatch portion of the competition.

He represented Chile at the 2020 Summer Olympics.

In 2024, he won the silver medal in the men's 89 kg event at the Pan American Weightlifting Championships held in Caracas, Venezuela.

== Major results ==
Year	Venue	Weight	Snatch (kg)				Clean & Jerk (kg)				Total	Rank
Year	Venue	Weight	1	2	3	Rank	1	2	3	Rank	Total	Rank
Olympic Games
2021	Tokyo, Japan	81 kg	160	~~163~~	~~165~~	8	~~190~~	~~190~~	~~190~~	—	—	—
World Championships
2017	Anaheim, United States	85 kg	163	171	175	1st place, gold medalist(s)	203	~~214~~	~~221~~	1st place, gold medalist(s)	378	1st place, gold medalist(s)
2018	Ashgabat, Turkmenistan	89 kg	160	~~168~~	169	1st place, gold medalist(s)	190	200	~~210~~	7	369	5
