= Nico Müller (weightlifter) =

German weightlifter (born 1993)

Personal information
- Nationality: German
- Born: 2 November 1993 (age 32)
- Height: 1.68 m (5 ft 6 in)
- Weight: 80.90 kg (178 lb)

Sport
- Country: Germany
- Sport: Weightlifting
Medal record
European Championships
Gold medal – first place	2018 Bucharest	–77 kg

Nico Müller (born 2 November 1993) is a German Olympic weightlifter. He competed at the 2016 Summer Olympics in the men's 77 kg weight class. He finished in 10th place.

== Results ==
Year	Event	Weight	Snatch (kg)	Clean & Jerk (kg)	Total (kg)	Rank
2009	European Youth Championships	69 kg	117	145	262	8
2010	Youth Olympic Games	69 kg	125	NM	0	—N/a
2012	European Junior Championships	77 kg	142	175	317	8
2013	European Junior Championships	85 kg	145	185	330	4
2015	World Championships	77 kg	149	183	332	19
2016	European Championships	77 kg	153	188	341	5
2016	XXXI OLYMPIC GAMES	77 kg	151	181	332	10
2017	European Championships	77 kg	148	178	326	10
2017	World Championships	77 kg	150	183	333	13
2018	European Championships	77 kg	155	191	346	1
