= 2021 World Weightlifting Championships – Men's 96 kg =

World Weightlifting Championship

The men's 96 kilograms competition at the 2021 World Weightlifting Championships was held on 13 and 14 December 2021.

== Schedule ==
Date	Time	Event
13 December 2021	21:30	Group D
14 December 2021	08:30	Group C
14 December 2021	13:00	Group B
14 December 2021	16:00	Group A

== Medalists ==
Event	Gold		Silver		Bronze	
Snatch	Lesman Paredes (COL)	187 kg	Boady Santavy (CAN)	178 kg	Keydomar Vallenilla (VEN)	177 kg
Clean & Jerk	Fares El-Bakh (QAT)	222 kg	Artyom Antropov (KAZ)	221 kg	Keydomar Vallenilla (VEN)	214 kg
Total	Lesman Paredes (COL)	400 kg	Fares El-Bakh (QAT)	394 kg	Keydomar Vallenilla (VEN)	391 kg

== Records ==
Prior to this competition, the existing world records were as follows.

World record	Snatch	Sohrab Moradi (IRI)	186 kg	Ashgabat, Turkmenistan	7 November 2018
World record	Clean & Jerk	Tian Tao (CHN)	231 kg	Tokyo, Japan	7 July 2019
World record	Total	Sohrab Moradi (IRI)	416 kg	Ashgabat, Turkmenistan	7 November 2018

== Results ==
Rank	Athlete	Group	Snatch (kg)				Clean & Jerk (kg)				Total
Rank	Athlete	Group	1	2	3	Rank	1	2	3	Rank	Total
1st place, gold medalist(s)	Lesman Paredes (COL)	A	180	187 WR	~~190~~	1st place, gold medalist(s)	~~208~~	208	213	4	400
2nd place, silver medalist(s)	Fares El-Bakh (QAT)	A	172	~~175~~	~~175~~	6	217	222	~~229~~	1st place, gold medalist(s)	394
3rd place, bronze medalist(s)	Keydomar Vallenilla (VEN)	A	172	175	177	3rd place, bronze medalist(s)	210	~~214~~	214	3rd place, bronze medalist(s)	391
4	Artyom Antropov (KAZ)	A	160	164	~~167~~	13	216	221	~~224~~	2nd place, silver medalist(s)	385
5	Boady Santavy (CAN)	A	172	176	178	2nd place, silver medalist(s)	201	~~206~~	~~207~~	13	379
6	Reza Dehdar (IRI)	A	~~168~~	168	172	7	207	~~216~~	~~217~~	9	379
7	Georgi Kuptsov (RWF)	A	164	169	174	4	204	~~209~~	~~210~~	11	378
8	Ahmed Sayed Ali (EGY)	B	~~165~~	165	~~171~~	11	207	212	~~217~~	5	377
9	Romain Imadouchène (FRA)	B	155	160	~~163~~	17	205	210	212	6	372
10	Andrés Serna (COL)	B	153	158	163	15	198	203	208	7	371
11	Davit Hovhannisyan (ARM)	B	165	~~170~~	~~170~~	9	200	205	~~210~~	10	370
12	Hakob Mkrtchyan (ARM)	A	163	~~167~~	~~167~~	16	207	~~212~~	~~212~~	8	370
13	Petr Asayonak (BLR)	B	165	~~170~~	~~170~~	10	196	202	~~206~~	12	367
14	Artur Babayan (RWF)	A	165	~~170~~	~~173~~	12	200	~~205~~	~~207~~	14	365
15	Anton Pliesnoi (GEO)	B	~~170~~	170	~~177~~	8	190	—	—	19	360
16	Ali Al-Khazal (KSA)	C	154	159	163	14	194	~~202~~	~~202~~	16	357
17	Irakli Gobejishvili (GEO)	C	~~154~~	154	158	18	183	~~188~~	188	22	346
18	Antonis Martasidis (CYP)	C	145	~~152~~	153	21	185	190	~~195~~	18	343
19	Khojiakbar Olimov (UZB)	C	148	~~152~~	152	23	180	186	191	17	343
20	Saddam Messaoui (ALG)	C	~~155~~	155	~~160~~	19	~~185~~	~~185~~	185	24	340
21	Vikas Thakur (IND)	C	~~150~~	150	~~154~~	24	183	189	~~194~~	21	339
22	Wilmer Contreras (ECU)	C	147	150	152	22	~~183~~	~~183~~	183	25	335
23	Jagdish Vishwakarma (IND)	D	137	142	~~145~~	26	180	186	~~191~~	23	328
24	Weeraphat Boonlang (THA)	D	~~140~~	140	146	25	160	173	181	26	327
25	Yannick Tschan (SUI)	D	138	142	~~145~~	27	175	179	~~184~~	28	321
26	Joël Essama (CMR)	D	130	138	~~145~~	28	~~170~~	170	175	29	313
27	John Tabique (PHI)	D	130	137	~~140~~	29	167	~~172~~	~~172~~	30	304
28	Cédric Coret (MRI)	D	~~130~~	130	~~137~~	32	~~166~~	166	~~171~~	31	296
29	Shanaka Peters (SRI)	D	125	130	~~133~~	31	165	~~170~~	~~170~~	32	295
30	Jiarul Islam (BAN)	D	117	123	~~129~~	33	143	153	~~160~~	33	276
—	Chen Po-jen (TPE)	A	170	173	~~177~~	5	~~195~~	~~195~~	~~195~~	—	—
—	Leho Pent (EST)	C	153	~~157~~	~~158~~	20	~~187~~	~~187~~	~~190~~	—	—
—	John Cheah (SGP)	D	~~132~~	134	~~137~~	30	~~165~~	~~166~~	~~166~~	—	—
—	Abdalla Galal Mostafa (EGY)	B	~~155~~	~~155~~	~~155~~	—	195	~~200~~	~~200~~	15	—
—	Gerasimos Galiatsatos (GRE)	B	~~176~~	~~176~~	~~177~~	—	~~190~~	~~190~~	190	20	—
—	Forrester Osei (GHA)	C	~~150~~	~~150~~	~~150~~	—	175	181	~~186~~	27	—
—	Marco Gregório (BRA)	B	~~166~~	~~166~~	~~166~~	—	—	—	—	—	—
—	Jang Yeon-hak (KOR)	A	~~171~~	~~176~~	~~176~~	—	~~201~~	~~201~~	~~201~~	—	—

== New records ==
Snatch	187 kg	Lesman Paredes (COL)	WR
