= 2023 World Weightlifting Championships – Men's 102 kg =

The men's 102 kilograms competition at the 2023 World Weightlifting Championships was held on 13 and 14 September 2023.

== Schedule ==
Date	Time	Event
13 September 2023	09:00	Group D
13 September 2023	21:30	Group C
14 September 2023	11:30	Group B
14 September 2023	19:00	Group A

== Medalists ==
Event	Gold		Silver		Bronze	
Snatch	Yauheni Tsikhantsou (AIN)	183 kg	Garik Karapetyan (ARM)	183 kg	Jang Yeon-hak (KOR)	182 kg
Clean & Jerk	Liu Huanhua (CHN)	224 kg	Fares El-Bakh (QAT)	218 kg	Jang Yeon-hak (KOR)	217 kg
Total	Liu Huanhua (CHN)	404 kg	Jang Yeon-hak (KOR)	399 kg	Yauheni Tsikhantsou (AIN)	394 kg

== Records ==
Prior to this competition, the existing world records were as follows.

World Record	Snatch	World Standard	191 kg	—	1 November 2018
World Record	Clean & Jerk	World Standard	231 kg	—	1 November 2018
World Record	Total	World Standard	412 kg	—	1 November 2018

== Results ==
Rank	Athlete	Group	Snatch (kg)				Clean & Jerk (kg)				Total
Rank	Athlete	Group	1	2	3	Rank	1	2	3	Rank	Total
1st place, gold medalist(s)	Liu Huanhua (CHN)	A	171	176	180	4	~~215~~	221	224	1st place, gold medalist(s)	404
2nd place, silver medalist(s)	Jang Yeon-hak (KOR)	B	178	~~182~~	182	3rd place, bronze medalist(s)	210	217	~~221~~	3rd place, bronze medalist(s)	399
3rd place, bronze medalist(s)	Yauheni Tsikhantsou (AIN)	A	175	179	183	1st place, gold medalist(s)	211	~~217~~	~~217~~	9	394
4	Samvel Gasparyan (ARM)	A	178	~~183~~	~~184~~	6	216	~~222~~	~~222~~	5	394
5	Garik Karapetyan (ARM)	A	175	~~183~~	183 CJWR	2nd place, silver medalist(s)	210	~~217~~	~~217~~	12	393 JWR
6	Irakli Chkheidze (GEO)	B	170	175	~~179~~	9	210	216	~~221~~	4	391
7	Fares El-Bakh (QAT)	A	170	~~174~~	~~176~~	15	218	~~223~~	~~223~~	2nd place, silver medalist(s)	388
8	Don Opeloge (SAM)	B	166	171	~~175~~	12	208	215	~~220~~	6	386; OR
9	Reza Dehdar (IRI)	A	173	~~179~~	~~179~~	10	213	~~218~~	~~222~~	7	386
10	Jhonatan Rivas (COL)	C	165	~~175~~	175	8	200	~~207~~	207	16	382
11	Yasser Salem (EGY)	A	~~168~~	~~169~~	169	17	~~206~~	209	213	8	382
12	Artūrs Plēsnieks (LAT)	A	169	173	—	11	~~206~~	208	~~212~~	14	381
13	Ryunosuke Mochida (JPN)	B	165	170	~~173~~	14	200	210	~~215~~	10	380
14	Sharofiddin Amriddinov (UZB)	C	~~170~~	170	177	7	195	202	~~206~~	21	379
15	Arsen Kasabijew (POL)	A	165	169	~~172~~	16	210	~~220~~	~~220~~	11	379
16	Bekdoolot Rasulbekov (KGZ)	B	163	168	~~173~~	18	208	~~214~~	~~218~~	13	376
17	Hussein Al-Badrawi (IRQ)	C	162	~~166~~	170	13	198	205	~~213~~	18	375
18	Döwranbek Hasanbaýew (TKM)	B	~~176~~	178	~~181~~	5	~~190~~	195	~~202~~	26	373
19	Juan Zaldívar (CUB)	C	158	163	166	19	200	206	~~210~~	17	372
20	Artur Mugurdumov (ISR)	C	155	160	164	20	195	200	205	19	369
21	Daniel Goljasz (POL)	C	~~159~~	160	164	21	200	~~205~~	~~206~~	23	364
22	Junior Ngadja Nyabeyeu (CMR)	D	153	159	161	23	196	202	~~206~~	20	363
23	Rasoul Motamedi (IRI)	D	145	151	157	25	185	192	201	22	358
24	Taniela Rainibogi (FIJ)	C	~~160~~	160	~~164~~	24	190	195	~~203~~	25	355
25	Antonio Govea (MEX)	C	155	162	~~166~~	22	188	~~196~~	~~196~~	29	350
26	Ali Shukurlu (AZE)	C	157	~~162~~	~~165~~	26	185	193	~~199~~	28	350
27	Irmantas Kačinskas (LTU)	D	151	156	~~160~~	27	177	182	~~187~~	33	338
28	Hannes Keskitalo (FIN)	D	143	~~148~~	~~148~~	32	180	188	193	27	336
29	Joshua Uikilifi (TGA)	D	140	145	150	28	175	180	185	31	335
30	Joen Vikingsson Sjöblom (SWE)	D	~~150~~	~~150~~	150	29	176	182	185	32	335
31	Stefan Ågren (SWE)	D	~~145~~	145	~~151~~	31	185	~~191~~	~~191~~	30	330
32	Jacob Diakovasilis (DEN)	D	142	146	~~149~~	30	178	~~185~~	~~190~~	33	324
33	Ruben Burger (RSA)	D	135	~~140~~	~~140~~	33	168	~~174~~	175	36	310
34	Thomas Wilbur (VAN)	D	~~128~~	128	133	34	164	170	175	35	308
35	Mohammad Al-Ruweai (KUW)	D	115	123	~~130~~	35	150	~~160~~	~~160~~	37	273
—	Jhohan Sanguino (VEN)	C	~~165~~	~~165~~	~~165~~	—	195	201	207	15	—
—	Siarhei Sharankou (AIN)	B	~~172~~	~~172~~	~~172~~	—	195	200	~~208~~	24	—
—	Aymen Touairi (ALG)	A	~~170~~	~~170~~	~~171~~	—	—	—	—	—	—
—	Chen Po-jen (TPE)	C	~~175~~	~~175~~	~~180~~	—	—	—	—	—	—
—	Ryan Sester (USA)	B	~~160~~	~~160~~	~~160~~	—	—	—	—	—	—
—	Aymen Bacha (TUN)	B	~~170~~	~~173~~	~~176~~	—	—	—	—	—	—
—	Tudor Bratu (MDA)	B	—	—	—	—	—	—	—	—	—
—	Jin Yun-seong (KOR)	B	—	—	—	—	—	—	—	—	—
—	Lesman Paredes (BHR)	D	—	—	—	—	—	—	—	—	—
—	Matthäus Hofmann (GER)	D	—	—	—	—	—	—	—	—	—
—	Luis Lamenza (PUR)	D	—	—	—	—	—	—	—	—	—
—	Vasil Marinov (BUL)	D	—	—	—	—	—	—	—	—	—
—	Marcos Ruiz (ESP)	D	—	—	—	—	—	—	—	—	—
—	Ahmed Abuzriba (LBA)	D	—	—	—	—	—	—	—	—	—
—	David Fischerov (BUL)	D	Did not start								
