= List of Georgian records in Olympic weightlifting =

The following are the national records in Olympic weightlifting in Georgia. Records are maintained in each weight class for the snatch lift, clean and jerk lift, and the total for both lifts by the Georgian Weightlifting Federation (GEOWF).

== Current records ==
=== Men ===
Event	Record	Athlete	Date	Meet	Place	Ref
60 kg
Snatch	128 kg	Goderdzi Berdelidze	3 October 2025	World Championships	Førde, Norway	
Clean & Jerk	158 kg	Goderdzi Berdelidze	3 October 2025	World Championships	Førde, Norway	
Total	283 kg	Goderdzi Berdelidze	3 October 2025	World Championships	Førde, Norway	
65 kg
Snatch	131 kg	Standard				
Clean & Jerk	160 kg	Standard				
Total	290 kg	Standard				
71 kg
Snatch	140 kg	Standard				
Clean & Jerk	171 kg	Standard				
Total	310 kg	Standard				
79 kg
Snatch	153 kg	Archil Malakmadze	22 April 2026	European Championships	Batumi, Georgia	
Clean & Jerk	183 kg	Archil Malakmadze	22 April 2026	European Championships	Batumi, Georgia	
Total	336 kg	Archil Malakmadze	22 April 2026	European Championships	Batumi, Georgia	
85 kg
Snatch	161 kg	Zurab Mskhaladze	2 November 2026	World Championships	Ningbo, China	
Clean & Jerk	201 kg	Zurab Mskhaladze	2 November 2026	World Championships	Ningbo, China	
Total	362 kg	Zurab Mskhaladze	2 November 2026	World Championships	Ningbo, China	
95 kg
Snatch	173 kg	Goga Jajvani	4 November 2026	World Championships	Ningbo, China	
Clean & Jerk	202 kg	Goga Jajvani	4 November 2026	World Championships	Ningbo, China	
Total	375 kg	Goga Jajvani	4 November 2026	World Championships	Ningbo, China	
110 kg
Snatch	178 kg	Standard				
Clean & Jerk	215 kg	Standard				
Total	393 kg	Standard				
+110 kg
Snatch	200 kg	Standard				
Clean & Jerk	235 kg	Standard				
Total	430 kg	Standard				

=== Women ===
Event	Record	Athlete	Date	Meet	Place	Ref
48 kg
Snatch	68 kg	Standard				
Clean & Jerk	85 kg	Standard				
Total	150 kg	Standard				
53 kg
Snatch	73 kg	Standard				
Clean & Jerk	92 kg	Standard				
Total	162 kg	Standard				
58 kg
Snatch	77 kg	Standard				
Clean & Jerk	97 kg	Standard				
Total	174 kg	Standard				
63 kg
Snatch	81 kg	Standard				
Clean & Jerk	101 kg	Standard				
Total	182 kg	Standard				
69 kg
Snatch	86 kg	Standard				
Clean & Jerk	106 kg	Standard				
Total	192 kg	Standard				
77 kg
Snatch	109 kg	Nana Khorava	23 April 2026	European Championships	Batumi, Georgia	
Clean & Jerk	127 kg	Nana Khorava	23 April 2026	European Championships	Batumi, Georgia	
Total	236 kg	Nana Khorava	23 April 2026	European Championships	Batumi, Georgia	
86 kg
Snatch	112 kg	Mariam Murgvliani	18 October 2026	European Junior Championships	Durrës, Albania	
Clean & Jerk	136 kg	Mariam Murgvliani	18 October 2026	European Junior Championships	Durrës, Albania	
Total	248 kg	Mariam Murgvliani	18 October 2026	European Junior Championships	Durrës, Albania	
+86 kg
Snatch	118 kg	Anastasiia Hotfrid	26 April 2026	European Championships	Batumi, Georgia	
Clean & Jerk	144 kg	Anastasiia Hotfrid	26 April 2026	European Championships	Batumi, Georgia	
Total	262 kg	Anastasiia Hotfrid	26 April 2026	European Championships	Batumi, Georgia	

== Historical records ==
=== Men (2018–2025) ===
Event	Record	Athlete	Date	Meet	Place	Ref
55 kg
Snatch	113 kg	Ramini Shamilishvili	16 April 2023	European Championships	Yerevan, Armenia	
Clean & Jerk	136 kg	Ramini Shamilishvili	16 April 2023	European Championships	Yerevan, Armenia	
Total	249 kg	Ramini Shamilishvili	16 April 2023	European Championships	Yerevan, Armenia	
61 kg
Snatch	136 kg	Shota Mishvelidze	16 April 2023	European Championships	Yerevan, Armenia	
Clean & Jerk	162 kg	Shota Mishvelidze	16 April 2023	European Championships	Yerevan, Armenia	
Total	298 kg	Shota Mishvelidze	16 April 2023	European Championships	Yerevan, Armenia	
67 kg
Snatch	142 kg	Shota Mishvelidze	30 May 2022	European Championships	Tirana, Albania	
Clean & Jerk	170 kg	Goga Chkheidze	5 April 2021	European Championships	Moscow, Russia	
Total	310 kg	Goga Chkheidze	5 April 2021	European Championships	Moscow, Russia	
73 kg
Snatch	151 kg	Kakhi Asanidze	18 April 2023	European Championships	Yerevan, Armenia	
Clean & Jerk	179 kg	Kakhi Asanidze	6 April 2021	European Championships	Moscow, Russia	
Total	327 kg	Kakhi Asanidze	6 April 2021	European Championships	Moscow, Russia	
81 kg
Snatch						
Clean & Jerk						
Total						
89 kg
Snatch	171 kg	Revaz Davitadze	8 April 2021	European Championships	Moscow, Russia	
Clean & Jerk	203 kg	Revaz Davitadze	8 April 2021	European Championships	Moscow, Russia	
Total	374 kg	Revaz Davitadze	8 April 2021	European Championships	Moscow, Russia	
96 kg
Snatch	180 kg	Anton Pliesnoi	9 April 2021	European Championships	Moscow, Russia	
Clean & Jerk	213 kg	Anton Pliesnoi	9 April 2021	European Championships	Moscow, Russia	
Total	393 kg	Anton Pliesnoi	9 April 2021	European Championships	Moscow, Russia	
102 kg
Snatch	175 kg	Irakli Chkheidze	14 September 2023	World Championships	Riyadh, Saudi Arabia	
Clean & Jerk	216 kg	Irakli Chkheidze	22 April 2023	European Championships	Yerevan, Armenia	
Total	391 kg	Irakli Chkheidze	14 September 2023	World Championships	Riyadh, Saudi Arabia	
109 kg
Snatch	173 kg	Giorgi Chkheidze	22 April 2023	European Championships	Yerevan, Armenia	
Clean & Jerk	214 kg	Zaza Lomtadze	16 September 2023	World Championships	Riyadh, Saudi Arabia	
Total	381 kg	Giorgi Chkheidze	22 April 2023	European Championships	Yerevan, Armenia	
+109 kg
Snatch	225 kg	Lasha Talakhadze	17 December 2021	World Championships	Tashkent, Uzbekistan	
Clean & Jerk	267 kg	Lasha Talakhadze	17 December 2021	World Championships	Tashkent, Uzbekistan	
Total	492 kg	Lasha Talakhadze	17 December 2021	World Championships	Tashkent, Uzbekistan	

=== Women (2018–2025) ===
Event	Record	Athlete	Date	Meet	Place	Ref
45 kg
Snatch						
Clean & Jerk						
Total						
49 kg
Snatch	73 kg	Mariam Maisuradze	15 April 2023	European Championships	Yerevan, Armenia	
Clean & Jerk	92 kg	Mariam Maisuradze	15 April 2023	European Championships	Yerevan, Armenia	
Total	165 kg	Mariam Maisuradze	15 April 2023	European Championships	Yerevan, Armenia	
55 kg
Snatch						
Clean & Jerk						
Total						
59 kg
Snatch						
Clean & Jerk						
Total						
64 kg
Snatch						
Clean & Jerk						
Total						
71 kg
Snatch						
Clean & Jerk						
Total						
76 kg
Snatch	103 kg	Nana Khorava	3 May 2025	World Junior Championships	Lima, Peru	
Clean & Jerk	117 kg	Nana Khorava	3 May 2025	World Junior Championships	Lima, Peru	
Total	220 kg	Nana Khorava	3 May 2025	World Junior Championships	Lima, Peru	
81 kg
Snatch	103 kg	Mariam Murgvliani	9 July 2023	European Youth Championships	Chișinău, Moldova	
Clean & Jerk	121 kg	Natia Gadelia	21 April 2023	European Championships	Yerevan, Armenia	
Total	224 kg	Mariam Murgvliani	9 July 2023	European Youth Championships	Chișinău, Moldova	
87 kg
Snatch	111 kg	Anastasiia Hotfrid	10 April 2021	European Championships	Moscow, Russia	
Clean & Jerk	131 kg	Mariam Murgvliani	5 May 2025	World Junior Championships	Lima, Peru	
Total	239 kg	Anastasiia Hotfrid	10 April 2021	European Championships	Moscow, Russia	
+87 kg
Snatch	117 kg	Anastasiia Hotfrid	23 April 2023	European Championships	Yerevan, Armenia	
Clean & Jerk	135 kg	Anastasiia Hotfrid	23 April 2023	European Championships	Yerevan, Armenia	
Total	252 kg	Anastasiia Hotfrid	23 April 2023	European Championships	Yerevan, Armenia	

== Historical records ==
=== Men (1998–2018) ===
Event	Record	Athlete	Date	Meet	Place	Ref
56 kg
Snatch						
Clean & Jerk						
Total						
62 kg
Snatch	134 kg	Shota Mishvelidze	27 March 2018	European Championships	Bucharest, Romania	
Clean & Jerk	165 kg	Shota Mishvelidze	27 March 2018	European Championships	Bucharest, Romania	
Total	299 kg	Shota Mishvelidze	27 March 2018	European Championships	Bucharest, Romania	
69 kg
Snatch						
Clean & Jerk						
Total						
77 kg
Snatch						
Clean & Jerk						
Total						
85 kg
Snatch	181 kg	Giorgi Asanidze	29 April 2000	European Championships	Sofia, Bulgaria	
Clean & Jerk	210 kg	Giorgi Asanidze	23 September 2000	Olympic Games	Sydney, Australia	
Total	390 kg	Giorgi Asanidze	23 September 2000	Olympic Games	Sydney, Australia	
94 kg
Snatch						
Clean & Jerk						
Total						
105 kg
Snatch	192 kg	Gia Machavariani	3 June 2012	Georgian Championships	Tbilisi, Georgia	
Clean & Jerk	225 kg	Gia Machavariani	3 June 2012	Georgian Championships	Tbilisi, Georgia	
Total	417 kg	Gia Machavariani	3 June 2012	Georgian Championships	Tbilisi, Georgia	
+105 kg
Snatch	220 kg	Lasha Talakhadze	5 November 2017	Georgian Championships	Tbilisi, Georgia	
Clean & Jerk	264 kg	Lasha Talakhadze	22 September 2018	Georgian Championships	Tbilisi, Georgia	
Total	478 kg	Lasha Talakhadze	22 September 2018	Georgian Championships	Tbilisi, Georgia	

=== Women (1998–2018) ===
Event	Record	Athlete	Date	Meet	Place	Ref
-48 kg
Snatch						
Clean & Jerk						
Total						
-53 kg
Snatch						
Clean & Jerk						
Total						
-58 kg
Snatch						
Clean & Jerk						
Total						
-63 kg
Snatch						
Clean & Jerk						
Total						
-69 kg
Snatch						
Clean & Jerk						
Total						
-75 kg
Snatch						
Clean & Jerk						
Total						
90 kg
Snatch	124 kg	Anastasiia Hotfrid	31 March 2018	European Championships	Bucharest, Romania	
Clean & Jerk	145 kg	Anastasiia Hotfrid	4 December 2017	World Championships	Anaheim, United States	
Total	265 kg	Anastasiia Hotfrid	4 December 2017	World Championships	Anaheim, United States	
+90 kg
Snatch						
Clean & Jerk						
Total						
