= List of Kyrgyzstani records in Olympic weightlifting =

The following are the records of Kyrgyzstan in Olympic weightlifting. Records are maintained in each weight class for the snatch lift, clean and jerk lift, and the total for both lifts by the Weightlifting Federation of Kyrgyzstan.

== Current records ==
=== Men ===
Event	Record	Athlete	Date	Meet	Place	Ref
60 kg
Snatch	103 kg	Bekbol Sarpashev	8 November 2025	Islamic Solidarity Games	Riyadh, Saudi Arabia	
Clean & Jerk	127 kg	Bekbol Sarpashev	8 November 2025	Islamic Solidarity Games	Riyadh, Saudi Arabia	
Total	230 kg	Bekbol Sarpashev	8 November 2025	Islamic Solidarity Games	Riyadh, Saudi Arabia	
65 kg
Snatch	120 kg	Dastan Imanaliev	24 September 2026	Asian Games	Nagoya, Japan	
Clean & Jerk	140 kg	Dastan Imanaliev	24 September 2026	Asian Games	Nagoya, Japan	
Total	260 kg	Dastan Imanaliev	24 September 2026	Asian Games	Nagoya, Japan	
71 kg
Snatch	127 kg	Erbol Sarpashev	9 November 2025	Islamic Solidarity Games	Riyadh, Saudi Arabia	
Clean & Jerk	165 kg	Erbol Sarpashev	9 November 2025	Islamic Solidarity Games	Riyadh, Saudi Arabia	
Total	292 kg	Erbol Sarpashev	9 November 2025	Islamic Solidarity Games	Riyadh, Saudi Arabia	
79 kg
Snatch	145 kg	Talant Turatbekov	10 November 2025	Islamic Solidarity Games	Riyadh, Saudi Arabia	
Clean & Jerk	165 kg	Talant Turatbekov	10 November 2025	Islamic Solidarity Games	Riyadh, Saudi Arabia	
Total	310 kg	Talant Turatbekov	10 November 2025	Islamic Solidarity Games	Riyadh, Saudi Arabia	
88 kg
Snatch	135 kg	Sergei Denisenko	10 November 2025	Islamic Solidarity Games	Riyadh, Saudi Arabia	
Clean & Jerk	165 kg	Sergei Denisenko	10 November 2025	Islamic Solidarity Games	Riyadh, Saudi Arabia	
Total	310 kg	Sergei Denisenko	10 November 2025	Islamic Solidarity Games	Riyadh, Saudi Arabia	
94 kg
Snatch						
Clean & Jerk						
Total						
110 kg
Snatch						
Clean & Jerk						
Total						
+110 kg
Snatch						
Clean & Jerk						
Total						

=== Women ===
Event	Record	Athlete	Date	Meet	Place	Ref
48 kg
Snatch						
Clean & Jerk						
Total						
53 kg
Snatch						
Clean & Jerk						
Total						
58 kg
Snatch	68 kg	Aidai Kurbanbek Kyzy	9 November 2025	Islamic Solidarity Games	Riyadh, Saudi Arabia	
Clean & Jerk	85 kg	Aidai Kurbanbek Kyzy	9 November 2025	Islamic Solidarity Games	Riyadh, Saudi Arabia	
Total	153 kg	Aidai Kurbanbek Kyzy	9 November 2025	Islamic Solidarity Games	Riyadh, Saudi Arabia	
63 kg
Snatch						
Clean & Jerk						
Total						
69 kg
Snatch						
Clean & Jerk						
Total						
77 kg
Snatch						
Clean & Jerk						
Total						
86 kg
Snatch	70 kg	Zhamilia Zhenishbek	11 November 2025	Islamic Solidarity Games	Riyadh, Saudi Arabia	
Clean & Jerk	88 kg	Zhamilia Zhenishbek	11 November 2025	Islamic Solidarity Games	Riyadh, Saudi Arabia	
Total	158 kg	Zhamilia Zhenishbek	11 November 2025	Islamic Solidarity Games	Riyadh, Saudi Arabia	
+86 kg
Snatch						
Clean & Jerk						
Total						

== Historical records ==
=== Men (2018–2025) ===
Event	Record	Athlete	Date	Meet	Place	Ref
55 kg
Snatch						
Clean & Jerk						
Total						
61 kg
Snatch	110 kg	Ishimbek Muratbek Uulu	12 August 2022	Islamic Solidarity Games	Konya, Turkey	
Clean & Jerk	150 kg	Ishimbek Muratbek Uulu	7 October 2022	Asian Championships	Manama, Bahrain	
Total	258 kg	Ishimbek Muratbek Uulu	7 October 2022	Asian Championships	Manama, Bahrain	
67 kg
Snatch	132 kg	Izzat Artykov	21 April 2019	Asian Championships	Ningbo, China	
Clean & Jerk	172 kg	Ishimbek Muratbek Uulu	4 April 2024	World Cup	Phuket, Thailand	
Total	294 kg	Ishimbek Muratbek Uulu	4 April 2024	World Cup	Phuket, Thailand	
73 kg
Snatch	130 kg	Izzat Artykov	8 May 2023	Asian Championships	Jinju, South Korea	
Clean & Jerk	160 kg	Izzat Artykov	8 May 2023	Asian Championships	Jinju, South Korea	
Total	290 kg	Izzat Artykov	8 May 2023	Asian Championships	Jinju, South Korea	
81 kg
Snatch						
Clean & Jerk						
Total						
89 kg
Snatch	166 kg	Emil Moldodosov	11 October 2022	Asian Championships	Manama, Bahrain	
Clean & Jerk	195 kg	Emil Moldodosov	11 October 2022	Asian Championships	Manama, Bahrain	
Total	361 kg	Emil Moldodosov	11 October 2022	Asian Championships	Manama, Bahrain	
96 kg
Snatch	166 kg	Bekdoolot Rasulbekov	31 July 2021	Olympic Games	Tokyo, Japan	
Clean & Jerk	208 kg	Bekdoolot Rasulbekov	31 July 2021	Olympic Games	Tokyo, Japan	
Total	374 kg	Bekdoolot Rasulbekov	31 July 2021	Olympic Games	Tokyo, Japan	
102 kg
Snatch	171 kg	Bekdoolot Rasulbekov	26 April 2019	Asian Championships	Ningbo, China	
Clean & Jerk	220 kg	Bekdoolot Rasulbekov	8 April 2024	World Cup	Phuket, Thailand	
Total	385 kg	Bekdoolot Rasulbekov	15 August 2022	Islamic Solidarity Games	Konya, Turkey	
109 kg
Snatch	173 kg	Bekdoolot Rasulbekov	15 October 2022	Asian Championships	Manama, Bahrain	
Clean & Jerk	216 kg	Bekdoolot Rasulbekov	15 October 2022	Asian Championships	Manama, Bahrain	
Total	389 kg	Bekdoolot Rasulbekov	15 October 2022	Asian Championships	Manama, Bahrain	
+109 kg
Snatch						
Clean & Jerk						
Total						

=== Women (2018–2025) ===
Event	Record	Athlete	Date	Meet	Place	Ref
45 kg
Snatch						
Clean & Jerk						
Total						
49 kg
Snatch						
Clean & Jerk						
Total						
55 kg
Snatch						
Clean & Jerk						
Total						
59 kg
Snatch						
Clean & Jerk						
Total						
64 kg
Snatch						
Clean & Jerk						
Total						
71 kg
Snatch						
Clean & Jerk						
Total						
76 kg
Snatch	97 kg	Tatiana Melnichenko	8 February 2024	Asian Championships	Tashkent, Uzbekistan	
Clean & Jerk	123 kg	Tatiana Melnichenko	5 October 2023	Asian Games	Hangzhou, China	
Total	219 kg	Tatiana Melnichenko	8 February 2024	Asian Championships	Tashkent, Uzbekistan	
81 kg
Snatch						
Clean & Jerk						
Total						
87 kg
Snatch	76 kg	Kanymzhan Almazbek Kyzy	15 August 2022	Islamic Solidarity Games	Konya, Turkey	
Clean & Jerk	95 kg	Kanymzhan Almazbek Kyzy	15 August 2022	Islamic Solidarity Games	Konya, Turkey	
Total	171 kg	Kanymzhan Almazbek Kyzy	15 August 2022	Islamic Solidarity Games	Konya, Turkey	
+87 kg
Snatch						
Clean & Jerk						
Total						
