= Weightlifting at the 2024 Summer Olympics – Men's 102 kg =

Men's 102 kg at the Games of the XXXIII Olympiad
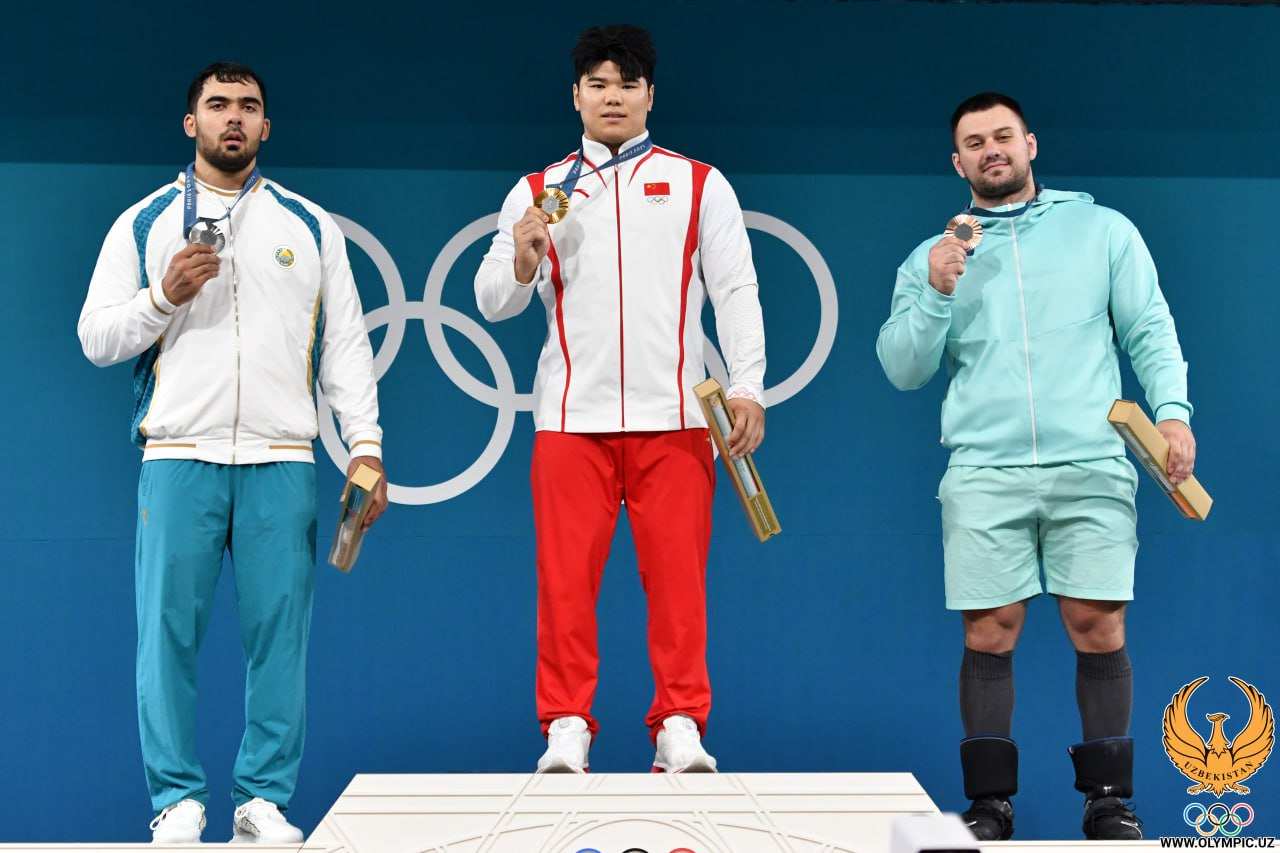
- The medalists of the event (from left to right): Djuraev, Liu, Tsikhantsou
- Venue: Paris Expo Porte de Versailles
- Date: 10 August 2024
- Competitors: 13 from 13 nations
- Winning total: 406 kg

Medalists
1st place, gold medalist(s)		Liu Huanhua	China
2nd place, silver medalist(s)		Akbar Djuraev	Uzbekistan
3rd place, bronze medalist(s)		Yauheni Tsikhantsou	Individual Neutral Athletes

The men's 102 kg weightlifting competition at the 2024 Summer Olympics was held on 10 August at the Paris Expo Porte de Versailles.

Due to the restructuring of new weight categories, the men's 109 kg category of the previous games was replaced by the men's 102 kg category. Going into the competition, Liu Huanhua of China and 2022 World Champion Fares El-Bakh of Qatar were seen as favourites to win. Garik Karapetyan of Armenia was also among the top contenders. Nurgissa Adiletuly of Kazakhstan was also seen as a contender prior to his suspension as he was disqualified in 2023 due to anti-doping measures. In the final, Liu won gold, followed by previous Olympic champion Akbar Djuraev of Uzbekistan with silver and Yauheni Tsikhantsou of the Individual Neutral Athletes winning bronze.

== Background ==
On 14 June 2022, the International Weightlifting Federation (IWF) officially announced the new weight categories for the 2024 Summer Olympics, with the total medal count reduced from fourteen to ten. The men's 109 kg category of the last games, which was won by Akbar Djuraev, was replaced by the men's 102 kg category.

At the 2022 World Weightlifting Championships, the first eligible event during the qualification timeline, 2020 Summer Olympic champion in the men's 96 kg category Fares El-Bakh placed first. Garik Karapetyan broke the junior world record in the clean and jerk with 214 kilograms at the 2023 European Weightlifting Championships, also placing first overall. At the 2023 Asian Weightlifting Championships, Nurgissa Adiletuly initially placed first with a 400 kilogram total but was eventually disqualified after testing positive for a stimulant.

Making his debut in the category, Liu Huanhua competed at the 2023 World Weightlifting Championships and placed first with a total of 404 kilograms. Four weeks later, although not in the timeline for the qualification period, Liu placed first and unofficially broke the two world records at the 2022 Asian Games. He lifted 233 kilograms for the clean and jerk and 418 for the total in the men's 109 kg category. At the competition, he weighed less than 102 kilograms and could have lifted in the category if it was in the programme of the games. The 2024 IWF World Cup was the last competition during the qualification period. There, Liu placed first, setting world records in the clean and jerk with 232 kilograms and with his combined total of 413 kilograms.

Sports Illustrated predicted that Liu would win, followed by El-Bakh in second and Karapetyan in third. A writer for the International Weightlifting Federation (IWF) named El-Bakh as the "man to beat". Adiletuly had also been seen as a medal contender prior to his suspension.

=== Qualification ===
Qualification for every event had spots for at least twelve weightlifters coming from different National Olympic Committees (NOC). Qualification spots were eligible for the ten highest-ranked weightlifters in the IWF Olympic Qualification Ranking, the highest-ranked weightlifter representing an NOC whose continent lies outside the top ten (IWF Olympic Continental Qualification Ranking), the host nation's reserved entry and a universality place. If a spot was still available once every continent was represented in the top ten, the host nation did not send an entry, a universality place was not used, or any combination of the following, the quota place was allocated to the next highest-ranked eligible weightlifter.

To be eligible for the event, all weightlifters must have competed at the 2023 World Weightlifting Championships in Riyadh, 2024 IWF World Cup in Phuket, and in at least three qualifying tournaments. Apart from two compulsory events, the host country France and those eligible for universality places may have competed in a minimum of two qualifying tournaments. For the men's 102 kg category, thirteen athletes were in the event, with the invitation of a Refugee Olympic Team member by the International Olympic Committee and the absence of a host entry.

Qualified weightlifters
Weightlifter	Country	Total (kg)	Qualification
Liu Huanhua	China	413	Ranking
Garik Karapetyan	Armenia	401	Ranking
Fares El-Bakh	Qatar	400	Ranking
Akbar Djuraev	Uzbekistan	400	Ranking
Yauheni Tsikhantsou	Individual Neutral Athletes	400	Ranking
Jang Yeon-hak	South Korea	399	Ranking
Lesman Paredes	Bahrain	398	Ranking
Davranbek Hasanbayev	Turkmenistan	392	Ranking
Irakli Chkheidze	Georgia	392	Ranking
Don Opeloge	Samoa	391	Ranking
Wes Kitts	United States	388	Continental ranking
Ahmed Abuzriba	Libya	—	Universality place
Ramiro Mora Romero	Refugee Olympic Team	—	Refugee Olympic Team slot

=== Records ===
The world records before the competition were the clean and jerk and total set by Liu at the 2024 IWF World Cup, while the world standard of 191 kilograms in the snatch, set by the IWF during the restructuring of categories, remained the same. As the event was new to the Olympic program, only the Olympic standards of 186 kilograms in the snatch, 226 kilograms in the clean and jerk, and 410 kilograms in the total, stood.

Records before the competition
World Record	Snatch	World Standard	191 kg	—	1 November 2018
World Record	Clean & Jerk	Liu Huanhua (CHN)	232 kg	Phuket, Thailand	8 April 2024
World Record	Total	Liu Huanhua (CHN)	413 kg	Phuket, Thailand	8 April 2024
Olympic Record	Snatch	Olympic Standard	186 kg	—	
Olympic Record	Clean & Jerk	Olympic Standard	226 kg	—	
Olympic Record	Total	Olympic Standard	410 kg	—	

== Results ==
The event was held on 10 August, starting at 11:30 a.m., at the Paris Expo Porte de Versailles. Opeloge and El-Bakh were eliminated during the snatch portion of the event after failing all three of their attempts. Abuzriba had the lightest snatch of the event at 164 kilograms while Liu and Karapetyan tied with the highest with 186 kilograms; Djuraev had the second-heaviest snatch with 185 kilograms. Aburziba pulled-out of the event before the clean and jerk portion started. Hasanbayev had the lightest clean and jerk of the event at 190 kilograms while Liu lifted 220 kilograms as the heaviest of the event; Djuraev and Tsikhantsou tied for the second-heaviest at 219 kilograms. With a total of 406 kilograms, Liu won the Olympic title. Djuraev and Tsikhantsou placed second and third, respectively.

Rank	Athlete	Nation	Snatch (kg)				Clean & Jerk (kg)				Total
Rank	Athlete	Nation	1	2	3	Result	1	2	3	Result	Total
1st place, gold medalist(s)	Liu Huanhua	China	178	183	186	186	220	~~228~~	~~233~~	220	406
2nd place, silver medalist(s)	Akbar Djuraev	Uzbekistan	180	185	~~189~~	185	219	~~224~~	~~232~~	219	404
3rd place, bronze medalist(s)	Yauheni Tsikhantsou	Individual Neutral Athletes	~~176~~	178	183	183	214	219	~~228~~	219	402
4	Garik Karapetyan	Armenia	180	~~186~~	186	186	212	~~218~~	~~218~~	212	398
5	Irakli Chkheidze	Georgia	171	176	179	179	~~214~~	214	~~224~~	214	393
6	Lesman Paredes	Bahrain	181	~~186~~	~~188~~	181	211	~~218~~	~~218~~	211	392
7	Ramiro Mora Romero	Refugee Olympic Team	161	166	~~168~~	166	201	206	210	210	376
8	Wesley Kitts	United States	167	172	~~177~~	172	202	~~210~~	~~210~~	202	374
9	Jang Yeon-hak	South Korea	173	~~179~~	~~180~~	173	200	~~211~~	~~221~~	200	373
10	Davranbek Hasanbayev	Turkmenistan	180	~~187~~	~~188~~	180	~~190~~	190	~~200~~	190	370
—	Ahmed Abuzriba	Libya	164	~~169~~	~~170~~	164	—	—	—	—	DNF
—	Fares El-Bakh	Qatar	~~178~~	~~178~~	~~178~~	—	—	—	—	—	DNF
—	Don Opeloge	Samoa	~~170~~	~~170~~	~~170~~	—	—	—	—	—	DNF
