= 2021 World Weightlifting Championships – Men's 102 kg =

Weightlifting Championship

The men's 102 kilograms competition at the 2021 World Weightlifting Championships was held on 15 December 2021.

== Schedule ==
Date	Time	Event
15 December 2021	13:00	Group B
15 December 2021	19:00	Group A

== Medalists ==
Event	Gold		Silver		Bronze	
Snatch	Jin Yun-seong (KOR)	180 kg	Rasoul Motamedi (IRI)	177 kg	Samvel Gasparyan (ARM)	175 kg
Clean & Jerk	Rasoul Motamedi (IRI)	220 kg	Bekdoolot Rasulbekov (KGZ)	217 kg	Amir Hoghoughi (IRI)	216 kg
Total	Rasoul Motamedi (IRI)	397 kg	Jin Yun-seong (KOR)	396 kg	Amir Hoghoughi (IRI)	388 kg

== Records ==
Prior to this competition, the existing world records were as follows.

World Record	Snatch	World Standard	191 kg	—	1 November 2018
World Record	Clean & Jerk	World Standard	231 kg	—	1 November 2018
World Record	Total	World Standard	412 kg	—	1 November 2018

== Results ==
Rank	Athlete	Group	Snatch (kg)				Clean & Jerk (kg)				Total
Rank	Athlete	Group	1	2	3	Rank	1	2	3	Rank	Total
1st place, gold medalist(s)	Rasoul Motamedi (IRI)	A	~~170~~	170	177	2nd place, silver medalist(s)	215	~~220~~	220	1st place, gold medalist(s)	397
2nd place, silver medalist(s)	Jin Yun-seong (KOR)	A	176	180	~~183~~	1st place, gold medalist(s)	~~216~~	216	~~220~~	4	396
3rd place, bronze medalist(s)	Amir Hoghoughi (IRI)	A	167	172	~~175~~	5	210	216	~~218~~	3rd place, bronze medalist(s)	388
4	Bekdoolot Rasulbekov (KGZ)	A	~~163~~	163	167	9	207	~~216~~	217	2nd place, silver medalist(s)	384
5	Aleksandr Kibanov (RWF)	A	165	170	~~173~~	7	203	208	~~212~~	5	378
6	Vasil Marinov (BUL)	A	168	~~172~~	~~173~~	8	205	~~211~~	~~212~~	6	373
7	Aliaksandr Venskel (BLR)	B	~~167~~	167	172	4	200	~~205~~	~~205~~	9	372
8	Fedor Petrov (RWF)	A	~~160~~	160	~~165~~	13	~~205~~	205	~~208~~	7	365
9	Irakli Chkheidze (GEO)	B	157	~~162~~	162	10	193	201	~~206~~	8	363
10	Zaza Lomtadze (GEO)	B	151	155	158	14	187	193	~~198~~	10	351
11	Tudor Ciobanu (MDA)	B	155	160	~~163~~	12	190	~~196~~	~~196~~	11	350
12	Dong Bing-cheng (TPE)	B	155	160	~~163~~	11	~~190~~	190	~~197~~	12	350
13	Kurbonmurod Nomozov (UZB)	B	148	153	~~157~~	15	180	187	—	13	340
14	Rashed Quran (CAN)	B	~~145~~	145	150	16	175	180	~~185~~	14	330
15	Jack Madanamoothoo (MRI)	B	135	~~145~~	~~145~~	17	160	171	~~175~~	15	306
—	Samvel Gasparyan (ARM)	A	175	~~180~~	~~181~~	3rd place, bronze medalist(s)	~~215~~	~~215~~	~~215~~	—	—
—	Arsen Martirosyan (ARM)	A	170	~~175~~	~~175~~	6	~~210~~	~~210~~	~~210~~	—	—
