= Jang Yeon-hak =

South Korean weightlifter (born 1997)

Personal information
- Born: 14 February 1997 (age 29)

Sport
- Country: South Korea
- Sport: Weightlifting
- Club: Asan City Hall
- Coached by: Jeon Sang-seok
Medal record
Men's weightlifting
Representing South Korea
World Championships
Silver medal – second place	2023 Riyadh	102 kg
Asian Games
Silver medal – second place	2018 Jakarta–Palembang	85 kg
Asian Championships
Bronze medal – third place	2020 Tashkent	96 kg
Bronze medal – third place	2023 Jinju	102 kg
Bronze medal – third place	2025 Jiangshan	109 kg
Summer Universiade
Bronze medal – third place	2017 Taipei	85 kg

Jang Yeon-hak (Korean: 장연학; born 14 February 1997) is a South Korean weightlifter.

== Career ==
He won the silver medal in the men's 85 kg event at the 2018 Asian Games held in Jakarta, Indonesia.

In 2017, Jang won the bronze medal in the men's 85 kg event at the Summer Universiade held in Taipei, Taiwan.

In August 2024, Jang competed in the men's 102 kg event at the 2024 Summer Olympics held in Paris, France. He lifted 373 kg in total and finished in ninth position.

== Major results ==
Year	Venue	Weight	Snatch (kg)				Clean & Jerk (kg)				Total	Rank
Year	Venue	Weight	1	2	3	Rank	1	2	3	Rank	Total	Rank
Olympic Games
2024	Paris, France	102 kg	173	~~179~~	~~180~~	—N/a	200	'~~211~~	~~221~~	—N/a	373	10
World Championships
2018	Ashgabat, Turkmenistan	89 kg	161	164	166	6	~~190~~	190	195	12	361	10
2019	Pattaya, Thailand	96 kg	~~164~~	164	~~169~~	11	197	203	~~206~~	10	367	9
2021	Tashkent, Uzbekistan	96 kg	~~171~~	~~176~~	~~176~~	—	~~201~~	~~201~~	~~201~~	—	—	—
2022	Bogotá, Colombia	96 kg	~~171~~	~~172~~	~~172~~	—	201	206	~~210~~	5	—	—
2023	Riyadh, Saudi Arabia	102 kg	178	~~182~~	182	3rd place, bronze medalist(s)	210	217	~~221~~	3rd place, bronze medalist(s)	399	2nd place, silver medalist(s)
IWF World Cup
2019	Tianjin, China	96 kg	~~162~~	165	~~170~~	4	196	200	204	3rd place, bronze medalist(s)	369	3rd place, bronze medalist(s)
2024	Phuket, Thailand	102 kg	175	~~180~~	~~180~~	10	—	—	—	—	—	—
Asian Games
2018	Jakarta, Indonesia	85 kg	160	163	165	—N/a	191	195	~~197~~	—N/a	360	2nd place, silver medalist(s)
2023	Hangzhou, China	109 kg	~~175~~	175	180	—N/a	~~210~~	210	~~216~~	—N/a	390	4
Asian Championships
2019	Ningbo, China	89 kg	~~161~~	161	166	1st place, gold medalist(s)	190	~~195~~	~~195~~	5	356	5
2021	Tashkent, Uzbekistan	96 kg	170	174	~~176~~	2nd place, silver medalist(s)	200	~~205~~	205	4	379	3rd place, bronze medalist(s)
2023	Jinju, South Korea	102 kg	175	179	182	1st place, gold medalist(s)	~~210~~	210	~~216~~	5	392	3rd place, bronze medalist(s)
2024	Tashkent, Uzbekistan	102 kg	175	~~180~~	~~181~~	3rd place, bronze medalist(s)	~~210~~	~~210~~	~~211~~	—	—	—
Summer Universiade
2017	New Taipei, Taiwan	85 kg	~~158~~	159	163	3	~~187~~	191	~~194~~	4	354	1st place, gold medalist(s)
