= Weightlifting at the 2018 Asian Games – Men's 85 kg =

Men's 85 kg at the 2018 Asian Games
- Venue: Jakarta International Expo
- Date: 24 August 2018
- Competitors: 13 from 12 nations

Medalists
gold medal	Safaa Rashed	Iraq
silver medal	Jang Yeon-hak	South Korea
bronze medal	Jon Myong-song	North Korea

The Men's 85 kilograms event at the 2018 Asian Games took place on 24 August 2018 at the Jakarta International Expo Hall A.

== Schedule ==
All times are Western Indonesia Time (UTC+07:00)

Date	Time	Event
Friday, 24 August 2018	11:00	Group B
Friday, 24 August 2018	17:00	Group A

== Records ==
Prior to this competition, the existing world, Asian and Games records were as follows.

World Record	Snatch	Andrei Rybakou (BLR)	187 kg	Chiang Mai, Thailand	22 September 2007
World Record	Clean & Jerk	Kianoush Rostami (IRI)	220 kg	Tehran, Iran	31 May 2016
World Record	Total	Kianoush Rostami (IRI)	396 kg	Rio de Janeiro, Brazil	12 August 2016
Asian Record	Snatch	Lu Yong (CHN)	180 kg	Beijing, China	15 August 2008
Asian Record	Clean & Jerk	Kianoush Rostami (IRI)	220 kg	Tehran, Iran	31 May 2016
Asian Record	Total	Kianoush Rostami (IRI)	396 kg	Rio de Janeiro, Brazil	12 August 2016
Games Record	Snatch	Vyacheslav Yershov (KAZ)	175 kg	Doha, Qatar	5 December 2006
Games Record	Clean & Jerk	Tian Tao (CHN)	218 kg	Incheon, South Korea	24 September 2014
Games Record	Total	Tian Tao (CHN)	381 kg	Incheon, South Korea	24 September 2014

== Results ==
Legend

- NM — No mark

Rank	Athlete	Group	Snatch (kg)				Clean & Jerk (kg)				Total
Rank	Athlete	Group	1	2	3	Result	1	2	3	Result	Total
1st place, gold medalist(s)	Safaa Rashed (IRQ)	A	155	159	~~162~~	159	196	~~202~~	202	202	361
2nd place, silver medalist(s)	Jang Yeon-hak (KOR)	A	160	163	165	165	191	195	~~197~~	195	360
3rd place, bronze medalist(s)	Jon Myong-song (PRK)	A	~~158~~	~~158~~	158	158	190	~~197~~	~~197~~	190	348
4	Toshiki Yamamoto (JPN)	A	145	151	155	155	191	~~198~~	~~198~~	191	346
5	Lim Young-chul (KOR)	A	~~155~~	155	~~160~~	155	190	~~198~~	~~198~~	190	345
6	Sunnatilla Usarov (UZB)	A	~~158~~	158	~~163~~	158	~~182~~	182	~~191~~	182	340
7	Daýanç Aşyrow (TKM)	B	~~145~~	145	150	150	175	~~178~~	~~178~~	175	325
8	Banyat Tawnok (THA)	B	~~150~~	~~150~~	151	151	170	~~175~~	~~175~~	170	321
9	Ali Al-Othman (KSA)	B	120	125	130	130	151	156	161	161	291
10	Ahmed Al-Qassass (PLE)	B	~~105~~	105	~~115~~	105	~~140~~	140	150	150	255
11	Yusri Amir Setia Yusof (BRU)	B	80	85	~~90~~	85	95	~~100~~	103	103	188
12	Edeliju Mesquita (TLS)	B	70	73	~~82~~	73	~~95~~	~~95~~	95	95	168
—	Ali Makvandi (IRI)	A	~~153~~	~~153~~	~~153~~	—	—	—	—	—	NM
