= Lee Seon-mi =

South Korean weightlifter (born 2000)

Personal information
- Born: 1 August 2000 (age 26) Gyeongsan, South Korea

Sport
- Country: South Korea
- Sport: Weightlifting
Medal record
Women's weightlifting
Representing South Korea
Junior World Championships
Gold medal – first place	2018 Tashkent	+90 kg
Gold medal – first place	2019 Suva	+87 kg

Lee Seon-mi (born 1 August 2000) is a South Korean weightlifter. She represented South Korea at the 2020 Summer Olympics in Tokyo, Japan. She finished in 4th place in the women's +87 kg event.

== Career ==
At the 2018 Junior World Weightlifting Championships held in Tashkent, Uzbekistan, she won the gold medal in the women's 90 kg event. In 2019, at the Junior World Weightlifting Championships held in Suva, Fiji, she won the gold medal in the women's +87 kg event.

In April 2021, she competed at the 2020 Asian Weightlifting Championships held in Tashkent, Uzbekistan.

== Major results ==
Year	Venue	Weight	Snatch (kg)				Clean & jerk (kg)				Total	Rank
Year	Venue	Weight	1	2	3	Rank	1	2	3	Rank	Total	Rank
Summer Olympics
2021	Tokyo, Japan	+87 kg	118	122	125	—N/a	148	152	~~155~~	—N/a	277	4
