= Jon Myong-song =

North Korean weightlifter (born 1993)

Personal information
- Born: 19 August 1993 (age 32)

Sport
- Country: North Korea
- Sport: Weightlifting
Medal record
Men's weightlifting
Representing North Korea
Asian Games
Bronze medal – third place	2018 Jakarta–Palembang	85 kg
Asian Weightlifting Championships
Silver medal – second place	2015 Phuket	77 kg

Jon Myong-song (born 19 August 1993) is a male North Korean weightlifter. He won the bronze medal in the men's 85 kg event at the 2018 Asian Games held in Jakarta, Indonesia.

In 2015, he won the silver medal in the men's 77 kg event at the 2015 Asian Weightlifting Championships held in Phuket, Thailand.
