= Amir Hoghoughi =

Iranian weightlifter (born 1994)

Personal information
- Nationality: Iranian
- Born: 17 February 1994 (age 32)
- Weight: 99.34 kg (219 lb)

Sport
- Country: Iran
- Sport: Weightlifting
- Event: 102 kg (225 lb)

Achievements and titles
- Personal bests: Snatch: 172 kg (2021); Clean and jerk: 216 kg (2021); Total: 388 kg (2021)
Medal record
Men's weightlifting
Representing Iran
World Championships
Bronze medal – third place	2021 Tashkent	102 kg
Asian Championships
Silver medal – second place	2019 Ningbo	102 kg

Amir Hoghoughi (Persian: امیر حقوقی; born 17 February 1994) is an Iranian weightlifter. He won the bronze medal in the men's 102 kg event at the 2021 World Weightlifting Championships held in Tashkent, Uzbekistan. He also won a silver medal at the 2019 Asian Weightlifting Championships in Ningbo.

== Major results ==
Year	Venue	Weight	Snatch (kg)				Clean & Jerk (kg)				Total	Rank
Year	Venue	Weight	1	2	3	Rank	1	2	3	Rank	Total	Rank
World Championships
2018	Ashgabat, Turkmenistan	96 kg	161	167	~~171~~	14	201	207	~~213~~	10	374	12
2021	Tashkent, Uzbekistan	102 kg	167	172	~~175~~	5	210	216	~~218~~	3rd place, bronze medalist(s)	388	3rd place, bronze medalist(s)
2023	Riyadh, Saudi Arabia	96 kg	166	~~169~~	~~170~~	11	206	~~210~~	~~212~~	5	372	5
Asian Games
2023	Hangzhou, China	96 kg	160	164	~~167~~	9	202	~~209~~	~~209~~	7	366	8
Asian Championships
2015	Phuket, Thailand	85 kg	155	~~163~~	~~163~~	7	185	~~196~~	~~197~~	7	340	7
2019	Ningbo, China	102 kg	161	~~169~~	169	5	202	215	~~221~~	2nd place, silver medalist(s)	384	2nd place, silver medalist(s)
Islamic Solidarity Games
2022	Konya, Turkey	102 kg	165	~~171~~	~~173~~	5	202	211	~~217~~	4	376	5
