= Fares El-Bakh =

Qatari weightlifter (born 1998)

Fares Ibrahim
Personal information
- Native name: فارس ابراهيم سعد حسونة الباخ
- Full name: Fares Ibrahim Sayed Hassouna El-Bakh
- Nickname: Meso Hassouna
- Nationality: Qatari
- Born: 4 June 1998 (age 28) Egypt
- Height: 1.78 m (5 ft 10 in)
- Weight: 95.95 kg (212 lb)

Sport
- Country: Qatar
- Sport: Weightlifting
- Event: –96 kg
- Coached by: Ibrahim El-Bakh

Achievements and titles
- Personal bests: Snatch: 178 kg (2019); Clean and jerk: 228 kg (2019); Total: 404 kg (2019)
Medal record
Men's weightlifting
Representing Qatar
Olympic Games
Gold medal – first place	2020 Tokyo	–96 kg
World Championships
Gold medal – first place	2022 Bogotá	–102 kg
Silver medal – second place	2019 Pattaya	–96 kg
Silver medal – second place	2021 Tashkent	–96 kg
Silver medal – second place	2024 Manama	–102 kg
Bronze medal – third place	2017 Anaheim	–94 kg
Asian Games
Silver medal – second place	2018 Jakarta	–94 kg
Asian Championships
Gold medal – first place	2022 Manama	102 kg
Silver medal – second place	2020 Tashkent	102 kg
Junior World Championships
Gold medal – first place	2017 Tokyo	–85 kg
Gold medal – first place	2018 Tashkent	–94 kg
Bronze medal – third place	2016 Tbilisi	–85 kg

Fares Ibrahim Saed Hassouna El-Bakh (Arabic: فارس ابراهيم سعد حسونة الباخ, born 4 June 1998), commonly known as Meso Hassouna, is a Qatari weightlifter of Egyptian origin. He is an Olympic Champion, World Champion and two-time Junior World Champion competing in the 85 kg, and 94 kg categories until 2018 and 96 kg and 102 kg starting in 2018 after the International Weightlifting Federation reorganized the categories.

He holds the junior world record in the clean & jerk (225 kg) and total (397 kg) in the 96 kg division. His father, Ibrahim Hassouna, represented Egypt at three consecutive Olympics from 1984 to 1992.

== Career ==
=== Olympics ===
He initially placed eighth at the men's 85 kg event at the 2016 Summer Olympics, but was updated to seventh after the original bronze medalist Gabriel Sîncrăian failed a drug test in October of that year.

At the 2020 Summer Olympics in Tokyo, he competed in the 96 kg category. After the snatch portion of the competition, he was in fourth place with a 177 kg lift, although the difference between first and fifth place was just 2 kg. In the clean & jerk section, he attempted his first lift after every competitor had finished their lifts. He successfully lifted 217 kg, clinching the gold medal, he followed himself with an Olympic record lift of 225 kg, which gave him a total of 402 kg (also an Olympic record). He attempted, but failed a world record lift of 232 kg, his total of 402 kg was 15 kg greater than the silver and bronze medalists. With his Olympic gold, he became the first Qatari Olympic Champion, regardless of sport.

In August 2024, he competed in the men's 102 kg event at the 2024 Summer Olympics held in Paris, France. He failed three attempts to lift 178 kg in the Snatch and he did not compete in the Clean & Jerk.

=== World Championships ===
In 2017 he moved up to the 94 kg category and competed at the 2017 World Weightlifting Championships, where he won a silver medal in the clean & jerk and originally placed fourth overall, but was upgraded to a bronze medal in the total after the original silver medalist Aurimas Didžbalis was disqualified after failing a drug test.

The next year he competed in the 2018 World Weightlifting Championships, where he won a bronze medal in the clean & jerk portion in the new 96 kg category. During the competition he set a new junior world record in the clean and jerk.

=== Other competitions ===
He competed at the 2016 Junior World Weightlifting Championships and won a bronze medal in the total in the clean & jerk and total in the 85 kg category. The following year he competed again at the Junior World Weightlifting Championships this time he got a gold medal in the 85 kg category.

In 2018 he defended his title as Junior World Champion, he won a gold medal at the Junior World Weightlifting Championships in the 94 kg category. He also won the Asian Junior Championships in the 94 kg division, later in 2018 he competed at the 2018 Asian Games and won the silver medal in the 94 kg category. At the 5th International Qatar Cup he swept gold in the 96 kg class, where he set a junior world records in the clean & jerk with 225 kg and total with 397 kg.

== Major results ==
Year	Venue	Weight	Snatch (kg)				Clean & Jerk (kg)				Total	Rank
Year	Venue	Weight	1	2	3	Rank	1	2	3	Rank	Total	Rank
Olympic Games
2016	Rio de Janeiro, Brazil	85 kg	151	155	158	—N/a	197	203	~~208~~	—N/a	361	7
2021	Tokyo, Japan	96 kg	173	~~177~~	177	—N/a	217	225 OR	~~232~~	—N/a	402 OR	1st place, gold medalist(s)
2024	Paris, France	102 kg	~~178~~	~~178~~	~~178~~	—N/a	—	—	—	—N/a	DNF	—
World Championships
2017	Anaheim, United States	94 kg	163	~~167~~	~~167~~	10	210	215	220	2nd place, silver medalist(s)	383	3rd place, bronze medalist(s)
2018	Ashgabat, Turkmenistan	96 kg	171	~~174~~	~~174~~	9	~~217~~	217	~~222~~	3rd place, bronze medalist(s)	388	5
2019	Pattaya, Thailand	96 kg	174	178	~~181~~	4	217	224	~~230~~	2nd place, silver medalist(s)	402	2nd place, silver medalist(s)
2021	Tashkent, Uzbekistan	96 kg	172	~~175~~	~~175~~	6	217	222	~~229~~	1st place, gold medalist(s)	394	2nd place, silver medalist(s)
2022	Bogotá, Colombia	102 kg	170	174	~~177~~	5	217	—	—	2nd place, silver medalist(s)	391	1st place, gold medalist(s)
2023	Riyadh, Saudi Arabia	102 kg	170	~~174~~	~~176~~	15	218	~~223~~	~~223~~	2nd place, silver medalist(s)	388	7
2024	Manama, Bahrain	102 kg	171	174	~~177~~	7	~~222~~	222	225	2nd place, silver medalist(s)	399	2nd place, silver medalist(s)
Asian Games
2018	Jakarta, Indonesia	94 kg	166	~~170~~	~~170~~	—N/a	215	~~222~~	~~222~~	—N/a	381	2nd place, silver medalist(s)
Asian Championships
2016	Tashkent, Uzbekistan	85 kg	145	150	~~155~~	8	191	196	~~200~~	3rd place, bronze medalist(s)	346	6
2019	Ningbo, China	96 kg	170	~~174~~	174	2nd place, silver medalist(s)	~~221~~	~~221~~	~~222~~	—	—	—
2020	Tashkent, Uzbekistan	102 kg	~~174~~	~~174~~	174	2nd place, silver medalist(s)	222	~~229~~	~~232~~	2nd place, silver medalist(s)	396	2nd place, silver medalist(s)
2022	Manama, Bahrain	102 kg	171	~~175~~	~~176~~	2nd place, silver medalist(s)	215	—	—	1st place, gold medalist(s)	386	1st place, gold medalist(s)
Junior World Championships
2016	Tbilisi, Georgia	85 kg	150	~~155~~	~~155~~	8	~~196~~	196	~~201~~	3rd place, bronze medalist(s)	346	3rd place, bronze medalist(s)
2017	Tokyo, Japan	85 kg	156	160	~~163~~	2nd place, silver medalist(s)	~~193~~	193	~~200~~	1st place, gold medalist(s)	353	1st place, gold medalist(s)
2018	Tashkent, Uzbekistan	94 kg	163	167	170	2nd place, silver medalist(s)	205	215	—	1st place, gold medalist(s)	385	1st place, gold medalist(s)
IWF Grand Prix
2023	Doha, Qatar	102 kg	172	176	~~179~~	3rd place, bronze medalist(s)	221	224	~~232~~	1st place, gold medalist(s)	400	1st place, gold medalist(s)
Qatar Cup
2018	Doha, Qatar	96 kg	~~168~~	~~171~~	172	1st place, gold medalist(s)	213	219	225	1st place, gold medalist(s)	397	1st place, gold medalist(s)
2019	Doha, Qatar	96 kg	~~173~~	~~173~~	176	2nd place, silver medalist(s)	213	223	228	1st place, gold medalist(s)	404	1st place, gold medalist(s)
