= 2018 Junior World Weightlifting Championships =

- Venue: Uzbekistan Sport Complex
- Location: Tashkent, Uzbekistan
- Dates: 7–14 July
- Competitors: 232 from 48 nations

The 2018 Junior World Weightlifting Championships were held in Tashkent, Uzbekistan at the Uzbekistan Sport Complex from 7 to 14 July 2018.

== Medal table ==
Ranking by Big (Total result) medals

* Host nation (Uzbekistan)

Rank	Nation	Gold	Silver	Bronze	Total
1	Uzbekistan*	3	1	1	5
2	Georgia	2	0	0	2
2	Latvia	2	0	0	2
2	Thailand	2	0	0	2
5	United States	1	4	1	6
6	Egypt	1	2	1	4
7	Ecuador	1	1	1	3
8	Iran	1	1	0	2
9	Vietnam	1	0	1	2
10	Qatar	1	0	0	1
10	South Korea	1	0	0	1
12	Colombia	0	2	2	4
13	Armenia	0	1	2	3
14	Tunisia	0	1	1	2
15	Brazil	0	1	0	1
15	Germany	0	1	0	1
15	Romania	0	1	0	1
18	Austria	0	0	1	1
18	Canada	0	0	1	1
18	India	0	0	1	1
18	Nauru	0	0	1	1
18	Pakistan	0	0	1	1
18	Turkey	0	0	1	1
Totals (23 entries)		16	16	16	48

Ranking by all medals: Big (Total result) and Small (Snatch and Clean & Jerk)

* Host nation (Uzbekistan)

Rank	Nation	Gold	Silver	Bronze	Total
1	Uzbekistan*	7	3	4	14
2	Thailand	6	1	1	8
3	Latvia	6	0	0	6
4	United States	5	10	3	18
5	Georgia	5	1	0	6
6	Egypt	4	4	3	11
7	Ecuador	3	3	3	9
8	South Korea	3	1	0	4
9	Vietnam	3	0	2	5
10	Iran	2	3	3	8
11	Qatar	2	1	0	3
12	Colombia	1	5	7	13
13	Pakistan	1	0	2	3
14	Armenia	0	3	4	7
15	Brazil	0	3	0	3
16	Tunisia	0	2	3	5
17	Austria	0	2	1	3
18	Germany	0	2	0	2
18	Romania	0	2	0	2
20	Turkey	0	1	6	7
21	Nauru	0	1	1	2
22	India	0	0	3	3
23	Canada	0	0	1	1
23	Poland	0	0	1	1
Totals (24 entries)		48	48	48	144

== Medal overview ==
=== Men ===
Event		Gold		Silver		Bronze	
– 56 kg	Snatch	Lại Gia Thành (VIE)	122 kg	Jairo García (COL)	117 kg	Ngô Đình Sơn (VIE)	113 kg
– 56 kg	Clean & Jerk	Lại Gia Thành (VIE)	144 kg	Lim Kang-hun (KOR)	143 kg	Jairo García (COL)	137 kg
– 56 kg	Total	Lại Gia Thành (VIE)	266 kg	Jairo García (COL)	254 kg	Ngô Đình Sơn (VIE)	249 kg
– 62 kg	Snatch	Adkhamjon Ergashev (UZB)	135 kg	Cristian Zurita (ECU)	127 kg	Patiphan Bupphamala (THA)	123 kg
– 62 kg	Clean & Jerk	Adkhamjon Ergashev (UZB)	160 kg	Jon Luke Mau (GER)	157 kg	Cristian Zurita (ECU)	150 kg
– 62 kg	Total	Adkhamjon Ergashev (UZB)	295 kg	Jon Luke Mau (GER)	278 kg	Cristian Zurita (ECU)	277 kg
– 69 kg	Snatch	Clarence Cummings (USA)	140 kg	Muhammed Furkan Özbek (TUR)	138 kg	Ramazan İlhan (TUR)	137 kg
– 69 kg	Clean & Jerk	Clarence Cummings (USA)	176 kg	Paul Dumitraşcu (ROU)	175 kg	Muhammed Furkan Özbek (TUR)	168 kg
– 69 kg	Total	Clarence Cummings (USA)	316 kg	Paul Dumitraşcu (ROU)	309 kg	Muhammed Furkan Özbek (TUR)	306 kg
– 77 kg	Snatch	Ritvars Suharevs (LAT)	156 kg	Hossein Soltani (IRI)	149 kg	Gayrat Aytmuratov (UZB)	146 kg
– 77 kg	Clean & Jerk	Ritvars Suharevs (LAT)	180 kg	Rafik Harutyunyan (ARM)	179 kg	Hossein Soltani (IRI)	177 kg
– 77 kg	Total	Ritvars Suharevs (LAT)	336 kg	Hossein Soltani (IRI)	326 kg	Rafik Harutyunyan (ARM)	324 kg
– 85 kg	Snatch	Revaz Davitadze (GEO)	164 kg	Ahmed Ali (EGY)	159 kg	Bartłomiej Adamus (POL)	158 kg
– 85 kg	Clean & Jerk	Harrison Maurus (USA)	198 kg	Revaz Davitadze (GEO)	192 kg	Ahmed Ali (EGY)	191 kg
– 85 kg	Total	Revaz Davitadze (GEO)	356 kg	Ahmed Ali (EGY)	350 kg	Harrison Maurus (USA)	349 kg
– 94 kg	Snatch	Jhonatan Rivas (COL)	171 kg	Faris Ibrahim (QAT)	170 kg	Samvel Babakyan (ARM)	160 kg
– 94 kg	Clean & Jerk	Faris Ibrahim (QAT)	215 kg	Jhonatan Rivas (COL)	203 kg	Rasoul Motamedi (IRI)	202 kg
– 94 kg	Total	Faris Ibrahim (QAT)	385 kg	Jhonatan Rivas (COL)	374 kg	Samvel Babakyan (ARM)	361 kg
– 105 kg	Snatch	Irakli Chkheidze (GEO)	171 kg	Akbar Djuraev (UZB)	167 kg	Amir Azizi (IRI)	162 kg
– 105 kg	Clean & Jerk	Irakli Chkheidze (GEO)	211 kg	Akbar Djuraev (UZB)	202 kg	Mohamed Abdelaziz (EGY)	200 kg
– 105 kg	Total	Irakli Chkheidze (GEO)	382 kg	Akbar Djuraev (UZB)	369 kg	Mohamed Abdelaziz (EGY)	360 kg
+ 105 kg	Snatch	Ali Davoudi (IRI)	192 kg	Varazdat Lalayan (ARM)	177 kg	Nooh Dastagir Butt (PAK)	171 kg
+ 105 kg	Clean & Jerk	Nooh Dastagir Butt (PAK)	228 kg	Ali Davoudi (IRI)	227 kg	Varazdat Lalayan (ARM)	222 kg
+ 105 kg	Total	Ali Davoudi (IRI)	419 kg	Varazdat Lalayan (ARM)	399 kg	Nooh Dastagir Butt (PAK)	399 kg

=== Women ===
Event		Gold		Silver		Bronze	
– 48 kg	Snatch	Chiraphan Nanthawong (THA)	81 kg	Luana Madeira (BRA)	76 kg	Jhilli Dalabehera (IND)	75 kg
– 48 kg	Clean & Jerk	Chiraphan Nanthawong (THA)	100 kg	Luana Madeira (BRA)	96 kg	Rira Suzuki (JPN)	95 kg
– 48 kg	Total	Chiraphan Nanthawong (THA)	181 kg	Luana Madeira (BRA)	172 kg	Jhilli Dalabehera (IND)	167 kg
– 53 kg	Snatch	Surodchana Khambao (THA)	87 kg	Jourdan Delacruz (USA)	86 kg	Yenny Sinisterra (COL)	84 kg
– 53 kg	Clean & Jerk	Surodchana Khambao (THA)	110 kg	Jourdan Delacruz (USA)	107 kg	Yenny Sinisterra (COL)	104 kg
– 53 kg	Total	Surodchana Khambao (THA)	197 kg	Jourdan Delacruz (USA)	193 kg	Yenny Sinisterra (COL)	188 kg
– 58 kg	Snatch	Rebeka Koha (LAT)	99 kg	Ailada Emdu (THA)	93 kg	Nouha Landoulsi (TUN)	90 kg
– 58 kg	Clean & Jerk	Rebeka Koha (LAT)	120 kg	Rosalba Morales (COL)	112 kg	Ayşegül Çakın (TUR)	110 kg
– 58 kg	Total	Rebeka Koha (LAT)	219 kg	Nouha Landoulsi (TUN)	198 kg	Tali Darsigny (CAN)	197 kg
– 63 kg	Snatch	Esraa El-Sayed (EGY)	94 kg	Ghofrane Belkhir (TUN)	94 kg	Kumushkhon Fayzullaeva (UZB)	94 kg
– 63 kg	Clean & Jerk	Kumushkhon Fayzullaeva (UZB)	120 kg	Esraa El-Sayed (EGY)	113 kg	Ghofrane Belkhir (TUN)	112 kg
– 63 kg	Total	Kumushkhon Fayzullaeva (UZB)	214 kg	Esraa El-Sayed (EGY)	207 kg	Ghofrane Belkhir (TUN)	206 kg
– 69 kg	Snatch	Sara Ahmed (EGY)	105 kg	Katherine Vibert (USA)	100 kg	Hellen Escobar (COL)	99 kg
– 69 kg	Clean & Jerk	Sara Ahmed (EGY)	133 kg	Katherine Vibert (USA)	125 kg	Hellen Escobar (COL)	124 kg
– 69 kg	Total	Sara Ahmed (EGY)	238 kg	Katherine Vibert (USA)	225 kg	Hellen Escobar (COL)	223 kg
– 75 kg	Snatch	Neisi Dájomes (ECU)	115 kg	Meredith Alwine (USA)	99 kg	Tursunoy Jabborova (UZB)	96 kg
– 75 kg	Clean & Jerk	Neisi Dájomes (ECU)	140 kg	Meredith Alwine (USA)	121 kg	Dilara Narin (TUR)	118 kg
– 75 kg	Total	Neisi Dájomes (ECU)	255 kg	Meredith Alwine (USA)	220 kg	Tursunoy Jabborova (UZB)	212 kg
– 90 kg	Snatch	Juliana Riotto (USA)	99 kg	Sarah Fischer (AUT)	98 kg	Tuğçe Boynueğri (TUR)	98 kg
– 90 kg	Clean & Jerk	Dolera Davronova (UZB)	128 kg	Sarah Fischer (AUT)	126 kg	Juliana Riotto (USA)	125 kg
– 90 kg	Total	Dolera Davronova (UZB)	225 kg	Juliana Riotto (USA)	224 kg	Sarah Fischer (AUT)	224 kg
+ 90 kg	Snatch	Lee Seon-mi (KOR)	122 kg	Lisseth Ayoví (ECU)	115 kg	Ashamarie Benitez (USA)	104 kg
+ 90 kg	Clean & Jerk	Lee Seon-mi (KOR)	152 kg	Charisma Amoe-Tarrant (NRU)	142 kg	Lisseth Ayoví (ECU)	141 kg
+ 90 kg	Total	Lee Seon-mi (KOR)	274 kg	Lisseth Ayoví (ECU)	256 kg	Charisma Amoe-Tarrant (NRU)	245 kg

== Team ranking ==
Rank	Men's		Women's	
Rank	Team	Points	Team	Points
1	Iran	512	United States	502
2	Uzbekistan	436	Thailand	481
3	Turkey	411	Uzbekistan	479
4	United States	407	Turkey	458
5	Poland	327	Ecuador	334
6	Colombia	308	Chinese Taipei	308
7	Japan	304	Canada	248
8	Chinese Taipei	292	Poland	245
9	Thailand	288	Colombia	204
10	Egypt	266	Spain	198

== Points ==
Rank	Men's				Women's			
Rank	Athlete	Body Weight	Total	Points	Athlete	Body Weight	Total	Points
1	Faris Ibrahim (QAT)	93.55	385	438.1334	Rebeka Koha (LAT)	57.10	219	305.6698
2	Jhonatan Rivas (COL)	93.70	374	425.3356	Neisi Dájomes (ECU)	74.55	255	304.6763
3	Revaz Davitadze (GEO)	84.65	356	423.5015	Sara Ahmed (EGY)	68.55	238	297.0649
4	Ritvars Suharevs (LAT)	76.25	336	421.6074	Surodchana Khambao (THA)	52.75	197	290.6604
5	Adkhamjon Ergashev (UZB)	61.70	295	421.5198	Chiraphan Nanthawong (THA)	47.40	181	289.7882
6	Harrison Maurus (USA)	82.15	349	421.2677	Jourdan Delacruz (USA)	52.55	193	285.5482
7	Clarence Cummings (USA)	68.95	316	420.2327	Nouha Landoulsi (TUN)	55.40	198	282.1314
8	Ali Davoudi (IRI)	160.50	419	420.0948	Lee Seon-mi (KOR)	116.70	274	281.1477
9	Irakli Chkheidze (GEO)	102.55	382	419.7710	Kumushkhon Fayzullaeva (UZB)	62.75	214	281.1464
10	Ahmed Ali (EGY)	85.00	350	415.5488	Katherine Vibert (USA)	68.60	225	280.7263

== Participating nations ==
- Algeria (1)
- Armenia (3)
- Australia (8)
- Austria (2)
- Brazil (1)
- Canada (11)
- Chile (1)
- Chinese Taipei (12)
- Colombia (8)
- Czech Republic (1)
- Denmark (1)
- Ecuador (8)
- Egypt (6)
- France (1)
- Georgia (3)
- Germany (2)
- Great Britain (1)
- Greece (2)
- Hungary (3)
- Indonesia (5)
- India (2)
- Iran (8)
- Iraq (3)
- Israel (2)
- Japan (11)
- Latvia (3)
- Lithuania (3)
- Nauru (1)
- New Zealand (2)
- Pakistan (1)
- Peru (4)
- Poland (11)
- Puerto Rico (2)
- Qatar (1)
- Romania (6)
- Saudi Arabia (5)
- Slovakia (5)
- South Korea (5)
- Spain (5)
- Syria (1)
- Thailand (13)
- Tunisia (2)
- Turkey (16)
- Turkmenistan (4)
- United Arab Emirates (1)
- United States (16)
- Uzbekistan (16)
- Vietnam (3)
