= Lesman Paredes =

Colombian Bahraini weightlifter

Lesman Paredes Montano
Personal information
- Full name: Lesman Teodoro Paredes Montano
- Nationality: Bahraini
- Born: 5 March 1996 (age 30) Cali, Colombia
- Weight: 93.64 kg (206 lb)

Sport
- Country: Bahrain (July 2022–present); Colombia
- Sport: Weightlifting
- Events: 96 kg; 102 kg
- Coached by: Leidy Andrea Zuluaga

Achievements and titles
- Personal bests: Snatch: 187 kg WR (2021); Clean and jerk: 215 kg (2022); Total: 400 kg AM (2021)
Medal record
Men's weightlifting
Representing Bahrain
World Championships
| Gold medal – first place | 2022 Bogotá | 96 kg |
Asian Championships
| Gold medal – first place | 2022 Manama | 96 kg |
Representing Colombia
World Championships
| Gold medal – first place | 2021 Tashkent | 96 kg |
Pan American Championships
| Gold medal – first place | 2020 Santo Domingo | 102 kg |
| Gold medal – first place | 2021 Guayaquil | 102 kg |
Junior World Championships
| Silver medal – second place | 2016 Tbilisi | 94 kg |

Lesman Teodoro Paredes Montano (born 5 March 1996) is a Colombian-born Bahraini weightlifter who won a Gold medal at the 2021 World Championships. He represents Bahrain since July 2022. He also won the gold medal in the men's 96 kg event at the 2022 World Weightlifting Championships held in Bogotá, Colombia.

== Career ==
Paredes was born in Cali and raised in Buenaventura.

He set a new world record in the snatch of 187 kilograms (412.2 pounds) at the 2021 World Weightlifting Championships in 96 kg category. He is also a two-time gold medalist in the men's 102 kg event at the Pan American Weightlifting Championships.

He won the gold medal in his event at the 2022 Asian Weightlifting Championships held in Manama, Bahrain.

In August 2024, Paredes competed in the men's 102 kg event at the 2024 Summer Olympics held in Paris, France. He lifted 392 kg in total and finished in sixth position.

== Achievements ==
| Year | Venue | Weight | Snatch (kg) | | | | Clean & Jerk (kg) | | | | Total | Rank |
| Year | Venue | Weight | 1 | 2 | 3 | Rank | 1 | 2 | 3 | Rank | Total | Rank |
Representing Bahrain
Olympic Games
| 2024 | Paris, France | 102 kg | 181 | ~~186~~ | ~~188~~ | —N/a | 211 | ~~218~~ | ~~218~~ | —N/a | 392 | 6 |
World Championships
| 2022 | Bogotá, Colombia | 96 kg | 176 | 181 | 185 | 1st place, gold medalist(s) | 207 | 212 | ~~214~~ | 2nd place, silver medalist(s) | 397 | 1st place, gold medalist(s) |
| 2023 | Riyadh, Saudi Arabia | 102 kg | — | — | — | — | — | — | — | — | — | — |
IWF World Cup
| 2024 | Phuket, Thailand | 102 kg | 181 | 186 | — | 2nd place, silver medalist(s) | 212 | — | — | 6 | 398 | 4 |
Asian Championships
| 2022 | Manama, Bahrain | 96 kg | 178 | 182 | — | 1st place, gold medalist(s) | 205 | 210 | 215 | 2nd place, silver medalist(s) | 397 | 1st place, gold medalist(s) |
| 2023 | Jinju, South Korea | 102 kg | — | — | — | — | — | — | — | — | — | — |
Representing Colombia
World Championships
| 2015 | Houston, United States | 94 kg | 167 | ~~172~~ | 172 | 6 | 195 | 202 | 207 | 6 | 379 | 5 |
| 2021 | Tashkent, Uzbekistan | 96 kg | 180 | 187 WR | ~~190~~ | 1st place, gold medalist(s) | ~~208~~ | 208 | 213 | 4 | 400 AM | 1st place, gold medalist(s) |
Pan American Championships
| 2020 | Santo Domingo, Dominican Republic | 102 kg | 170 | 175 | 180 | 1st place, gold medalist(s) | 200 | 210 AM | — | 1st place, gold medalist(s) | 390 AM | 1st place, gold medalist(s) |
| 2021 | Guayaquil, Ecuador | 102 kg | 170 | 181 AM | — | 1st place, gold medalist(s) | ~~205~~ | 205 | ~~215~~ | 1st place, gold medalist(s) | 386 | 1st place, gold medalist(s) |
World University Games
| 2017 | Taipei, Taiwan | 94 kg | — | — | — | —N/a | — | — | — | —N/a | — | — |
Junior World Championships
| 2014 | Kazan, Russia | 85 kg | 142 | ~~147~~ | 147 | 6 | 167 | ~~172~~ | ~~172~~ | 9 | 314 | 8 |
| 2015 | Wrocław, Poland | 94 kg | 155 | 160 | 165 | 3rd place, bronze medalist(s) | 185 | ~~190~~ | 190 | 4 | 355 | 4 |
| 2016 | Tbilisi, Georgia | 94 kg | 167 | 172 | ~~176~~ | 1st place, gold medalist(s) | ~~194~~ | 194 | 200 | 4 | 372 | 2nd place, silver medalist(s) |
