= Irakli Chkheidze =

Georgian weightlifter (born 1999)

Personal information
- Nationality: Georgia
- Born: 5 January 1999 (age 27)
- Weight: 100.52 kg (222 lb)

Sport
- Country: Georgia
- Sport: Weightlifting
- Event: 102 kg
- Coached by: Giorgi Asanidze

Achievements and titles
- Personal bests: Snatch: 175 kg (2023); Clean and jerk: 216 kg (2018); Total: 391 kg (2018)
Medal record
Representing Georgia
Men's weightlifting
European Championships
Silver medal – second place	2023 Yerevan	102 kg
Junior World Championships
Gold medal – first place	2018 Tashkent	105 kg
Gold medal – first place	2019 Suva	102 kg
European U23 Championships
Gold medal – first place	2022 Zamość	102 kg
European Junior Championships
Gold medal – first place	2018 Zamość	105 kg
Bronze medal – third place	2017 Durrës	105 kg

Irakli Chkheidze (Georgian: ირაკლი ჩხეიძე; born 5 January 1999) is a Georgian weightlifter competing in the 105 kg division until 2018 and 102 kg starting in 2018 after the International Weightlifting Federation reorganized the categories).

== Career ==
He most recently competed at the 2018 World Weightlifting Championships. He is also the 2018 Junior World Champion in the 105 kg class.

In August 2024, Chkheidze competed in the men's 102 kg event at the 2024 Summer Olympics held in Paris, France. He lifted 393 kg in total and finished in fifth position.

== Major results ==
Year	Venue	Weight	Snatch (kg)				Clean & Jerk (kg)				Total	Rank
Year	Venue	Weight	1	2	3	Rank	1	2	3	Rank	Total	Rank
Olympic Games
2024	Paris, France	102 kg	171	176	179	—N/a	~~214~~	214	~~224~~	—N/a	393	5
World Championships
2018	Ashgabat, Turkmenistan	102 kg	164	~~168~~	168	5	~~207~~	208	~~213~~	5	376	5
2019	Pattaya, Thailand	102 kg	163	~~167~~	~~167~~	11	198	204	~~213~~	10	367	10
2021	Tashkent, Uzbekistan	102 kg	157	~~162~~	162	10	193	201	~~206~~	8	363	9
2022	Bogotá, Colombia	102 kg	165	170	174	6	207	~~212~~	213	6	387	5
2023	Riyadh, Saudi Arabia	102 kg	170	175	~~179~~	9	210	216	~~221~~	4	391	6
IWF World Cup
2024	Phuket, Thailand	102 kg	170	~~174~~	~~174~~	16	211	~~222~~	—	7	381	11
European Championships
2019	Bucharest, Romania	102 kg	163	167	169	3rd place, bronze medalist(s)	~~202~~	~~203~~	203	6	372	4
2021	Moscow, Russia	102 kg	163	167	171	5	205	~~210~~	~~210~~	5	376	5
2022	Tirana, Albania	102 kg	163	168	171	6	202	~~209~~	~~210~~	5	373	4
2023	Yerevan, Armenia	102 kg	168	173	~~178~~	2nd place, silver medalist(s)	207	214	~~220~~	1st place, gold medalist(s)	387	2nd place, silver medalist(s)
2024	Sofia, Bulgaria	102 kg	168	174	~~178~~	6	212	~~217~~	~~218~~	3rd place, bronze medalist(s)	386	5
World Junior Championships
2016	Tbilisi, Georgia	94 kg	~~145~~	145	150	7	178	183	186	6	336	5
2017	Tokyo, Japan	105 kg	156	161	~~164~~	5	~~195~~	~~195~~	195	5	356	4
2018	Tashkent, Uzbekistan	105 kg	163	168	171	1st place, gold medalist(s)	201	205	211	1st place, gold medalist(s)	382	1st place, gold medalist(s)
2019	Suva, Fiji	102 kg	~~162~~	162	167	1st place, gold medalist(s)	199	204	~~213~~	1st place, gold medalist(s)	371	1st place, gold medalist(s)
European U23 Championships
2022	Zamość, Poland	102 kg	161	165	~~170~~	1st place, gold medalist(s)	194	205	216	1st place, gold medalist(s)	381	1st place, gold medalist(s)
European Junior Championships
2017	Durrës, Albania	105 kg	157	161	164	5	194	200	206	2nd place, silver medalist(s)	370	3rd place, bronze medalist(s)
2018	Zamość, Poland	105 kg	163	167	170	1st place, gold medalist(s)	202	209	216	1st place, gold medalist(s)	386	1st place, gold medalist(s)
