= Yauheni Tsikhantsou =

Belarusian weightlifter (born 1998)

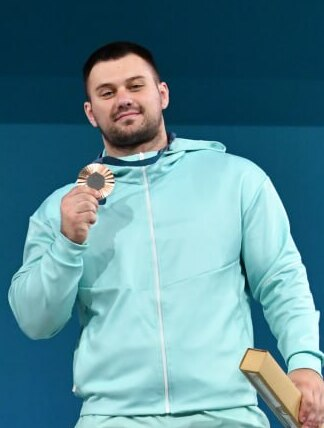
- Tsikhantsou at the 2024 Summer Olympics

Personal information
- Nationality: Belarusian
- Born: 4 November 1998 (age 28) Gomel, Belarus
- Weight: 100.00 kg (220 lb)

Sport
- Country: Belarus
- Sport: Weightlifting
- Event: 102 kg
Medal record
Men's weightlifting
Representing Belarus
World Championships
Gold medal – first place	2019 Pattaya	102 kg
European Championships
Gold medal – first place	2019 Batumi	96 kg
Representing Individual Neutral Athletes
Olympic Games
Bronze medal – third place	2024 Paris	102 kg
Representing Individual Neutral Athletes
World Championships
Bronze medal – third place	2023 Riyadh	102 kg
European Championships
Gold medal – first place	2024 Sofia	102 kg
Gold medal – first place	2025 Chișinău	102 kg

Yauheni Paulavich Tsikhantsou (Belarusian: Яўгені Паўлавіч Ціханцоў; born 4 November 1998) is a Belarusian weightlifter, World Champion, European Champion and Olympic bronze medalist. He currently competes in the 102 kg category.

== Career ==
=== Olympic Games ===
In August 2021, Tsikhantsou made an Olympic debut representing Belarus in the men's 96 kg event held in Tokyo, Japan. He lifted 173 kg in the Snatch placing sixth but did not make a successful attempt in the Clean & Jerk.

In August 2024, Tsikhantsou competed as Individual Neutral Athlete in the men's 102 kg event at the 2024 Summer Olympics held in Paris, France. He lifted 183 kg in the Snatch and placed forth but managed to overcame Armenia's Garik Karapetyan in the fight for the bronze medal with a total lift of 402 kg.

=== World Championships ===
In 2018, he competed as a junior at the 2018 World Weightlifting Championships in the newly created 96 kg division. He won a bronze medal in the snatch portion with a junior world record setting lift of 180 kg.

=== European Championships ===
In 2019, he competed at the 2019 European Weightlifting Championships in the 96 kg category. He made all six lifts in a perfect day, winning gold medals in the snatch, clean & jerk and total, setting European Records in the clean & jerk and total. His total of 400 kg was a full 22 kg over the silver medalist.

In 2024, he competed at the 2024 European Weightlifting Championships in the 102 kg category and became the overall gold medalist. Tsikhantsou won the silver medal in snatch, and the gold medal in the clean & jerk.

=== Other competitions ===
In 2018, he competed in the 5th International Qatar Cup winning a silver medal in the snatch, and bronze medals in both the clean & jerk and total.

=== Anti-doping violation ===
On 8 March 2026, a sample collected from Tsikhantsou returned a positive test for growth hormones. As of May 2026, he has not received a suspension.

== Major results ==
Year	Venue	Weight	Snatch (kg)				Clean & Jerk (kg)				Total	Rank
Year	Venue	Weight	1	2	3	Rank	1	2	3	Rank	Total	Rank
Olympic Games
2021	Tokyo, Japan	96 kg	~~170~~	~~170~~	173	—N/a	~~201~~	~~201~~	~~201~~	—N/a	DNF	—
2024	Paris, France	102 kg	~~176~~	178	183	—N/a	214	219	~~228~~	—N/a	402	3rd place, bronze medalist(s)
World Championships
2018	Ashgabat, Turkmenistan	96 kg	173	180	~~184~~	3rd place, bronze medalist(s)	210	~~217~~	~~217~~	7	390	4
2019	Pattaya, Thailand	102 kg	175	180	~~182~~	2nd place, silver medalist(s)	~~212~~	213	218	2nd place, silver medalist(s)	398	1st place, gold medalist(s)
2023	Riyadh, Saudi Arabia	102 kg	175	179	183	1st place, gold medalist(s)	211	~~217~~	~~217~~	9	394	3rd place, bronze medalist(s)
IWF World Cup
2024	Phuket, Thailand	102 kg	175	~~180~~	183	4	210	217	~~225~~	4	400	3rd place, bronze medalist(s)
European Championships
2019	Batumi, Georgia	96 kg	170	174	178	1st place, gold medalist(s)	204	210	222	1st place, gold medalist(s)	400	1st place, gold medalist(s)
2024	Sofia, Bulgaria	102 kg	~~176~~	176	181	2nd place, silver medalist(s)	211	217	~~222~~	1st place, gold medalist(s)	398	1st place, gold medalist(s)
2025	Chișinău, Moldova	102 kg	174	178	181	1st place, gold medalist(s)	207	215	218	1st place, gold medalist(s)	399	1st place, gold medalist(s)
Qatar Cup
2018	Doha, Qatar	96 kg	170	~~175~~	~~178~~	2nd place, silver medalist(s)	~~201~~	201	211	3rd place, bronze medalist(s)	381	3rd place, bronze medalist(s)
