= Boady Santavy =

Canadian weightlifter (born 1997)

Boady Santavy OLY
Personal information
- Nickname: Boady-Bob
- Born: May 22, 1997 (age 29) Sarnia, Ontario, Canada
- Height: 179 cm (5 ft 10 in)
- Weight: 94 kg (207 lb)

Sport
- Country: Canada
- Sport: Weightlifting
- Coached by: Dalas Santavy

Achievements and titles
- World finals: junior x3 - senior x2
- Highest world ranking: 4th (2020 Olympics)
- Personal bests: Snatch: 181 kg (2021); Clean and jerk: 210 kg (2019); Total: 389 kg (2021)
Medal record
Men's weightlifting
Representing Canada
Pan American Games
Silver medal – second place	2019 Lima	–96 kg
Pan American Championships
Silver medal – second place	2020 Santo Domingo	–96 kg
Bronze medal – third place	2019 Guatemala City	–96 kg
Commonwealth Games
Silver medal – second place	2018 Gold Coast	–94 kg
Commonwealth Championships
Gold medal – first place	2021 Tashkent	–96 kg

Boady Santavy OLY (born May 22, 1997) is a Canadian weightlifter from Sarnia, Ontario.

== Career ==
=== 2015 Pan American Games ===
Santavy made his international senior debut at the 2015 Pan American Games held in Toronto, Canada. At the games Santavy competed in the 85 kg event and finished in 6th (and last) place with a total of 322 kg. Santavy snatched 146 kg and clean and jerked 176 kg.

=== 2017 World Weightlifting Championships ===
Santavy moved up to compete in the 94 kg event at the 2017 World Weightlifting Championships held in Anaheim, California. Santavy finished in sixth place with an overall lift of 366 kg.

=== 2018 Commonwealth Games ===
Santavy qualified to compete at the 2018 Commonwealth Games to be held in the Gold Coast, Australia. Santavy qualified as the number one ranked athlete in the 94 kg event. Santavy unofficially broke the Commonwealth record in the 94 kg event in training in March 2018, weeks before the games.

=== 2020 Olympics ===
In June 2021, Santavy was named to Canada's Olympic team. He finished fourth in men's 96 kg event with a total of 386 kg.

=== 2024 Olympics ===
In June 2024, Santavy was again named as part of the Canadian Olympic team. He competed in the men's 89 kg event at the 2024 Summer Olympics held in Paris, France. He lifted 163 kg in the Snatch to place ninth provisionally and failed to register a lift in the Clean & Jerk.

== Major results ==
Year	Venue	Weight	Snatch (kg)				Clean & Jerk (kg)				Total	Rank
Year	Venue	Weight	1	2	3	Rank	1	2	3	Rank	Total	Rank
Summer Olympics
2021	Tokyo, Japan	96 kg	173	~~177~~	178	—N/a	200	~~205~~	208	—N/a	386	4
2024	Paris, France	89 kg	158	163	~~166~~	—N/a	~~186~~	~~187~~	~~188~~	—N/a	DNF	—
World Championships
2015	Houston, United States	85 kg	143	148	~~152~~	24	175	~~179~~	~~179~~	25	323	25
2017	Anaheim, United States	94 kg	~~157~~	160	165	7	195	201	~~206~~	6	366	5
2018	Ashgabat, Turkmenistan	96 kg	171	175	~~178~~	6	203	208	~~212~~	9	383	7
2019	Pattaya, Thailand	96 kg	170	~~175~~	~~175~~	5	~~203~~	203	210	6	380	6
2021	Tashkent, Uzbekistan	96 kg	172	176	178	2nd place, silver medalist(s)	201	~~206~~	~~207~~	13	379	5
2023	Riyadh, Saudi Arabia	96 kg	160	166	~~169~~	10	186	192	196	13	362	12
Pan American Games
2015	Toronto, Canada	85 kg	141	146	~~148~~	—N/a	171	176	~~180~~	—N/a	322	6
2019	Lima, Peru	96 kg	166	171	176	—N/a	203	208	~~215~~	—N/a	384	2nd place, silver medalist(s)
Pan American Championships
2016	Cartagena, Colombia	85 kg	145	150	152	4	173	176	~~180~~	89	328	8
2019	Guatemala City, Guatemala	96 kg	160	165	169	3rd place, bronze medalist(s)	196	201	~~207~~	3rd place, bronze medalist(s)	370	3rd place, bronze medalist(s)
2021	Santo Domingo, Dominican Republic	96 kg	175	181	~~187~~	1st place, gold medalist(s)	202	208	—	2nd place, silver medalist(s)	389	2nd place, silver medalist(s)
2024	Caracas, Venezuela	89 kg	168	~~173~~	~~173~~	3rd place, bronze medalist(s)	—	—	—	—	—	—

== Personal life ==
Santavy's father, Dalas, competed at the 2005 World Weightlifting Championships, while his grandfather, Bob, represented Canada at the 1968 and 1976 Summer Olympics in Mexico City and Montreal respectively. Santavy's grandfather also won a bronze at the 1975 Pan American Games in Mexico City. Santavy's younger brother Noah is also a weightlifter.

=== 2018 hit-and-run incident ===
On Sunday, March 18, 2018, Santavy struck and seriously injured a Sarnia, Ontario man, then fled the scene. The victim suffered a broken shoulder blade, clavicle, lacerated spleen, brain bleed and other superficial wounds. Santavy turned himself in to police the following day.
