= 2022 World Weightlifting Championships – Men's 102 kg =

Weightlifting competition

The men's 102 kilograms competition at the 2022 World Weightlifting Championships was held on 12 and 13 December 2022.

== Schedule ==
| Date | Time | Event |
|---|---|---|
| 12 December 2022 | 21:30 | Group C |
| 13 December 2022 | 11:30 | Group B |
| 13 December 2022 | 19:00 | Group A |

== Medalists ==
| Event | Gold | | Silver | | Bronze | |
|---|---|---|---|---|---|---|
| Snatch | Reza Dehdar (IRI) | 177 kg | Marcos Ruiz (ESP) | 176 kg | Samvel Gasparyan (ARM) | 175 kg |
| Clean & Jerk | Artyom Antropov (KAZ) | 222 kg | Fares El-Bakh (QTR) | 217 kg | Bekdoolot Rasulbekov (KGZ) | 217 kg |
| Total | Fares El-Bakh (QAT) | 391 kg | Reza Dehdar (IRI) | 390 kg | Samvel Gasparyan (ARM) | 389 kg |

== Records ==
Prior to this competition, the existing world records were as follows.

| World Record | Snatch | World Standard | 191 kg | — | 1 November 2018 |
| World Record | Clean & Jerk | World Standard | 231 kg | — | 1 November 2018 |
| World Record | Total | World Standard | 412 kg | — | 1 November 2018 |

== Results ==
| Rank | Athlete | Group | Snatch (kg) | | | | Clean & Jerk (kg) | | | | Total |
| Rank | Athlete | Group | 1 | 2 | 3 | Rank | 1 | 2 | 3 | Rank | Total |
|---|---|---|---|---|---|---|---|---|---|---|---|
| 1st place, gold medalist(s) | Fares El-Bakh (QAT) | A | 170 | 174 | ~~177~~ | 5 | 217 | — | — | 2nd place, silver medalist(s) | 391 |
| 2nd place, silver medalist(s) | Reza Dehdar (IRI) | A | 168 | 173 | 177 | 1st place, gold medalist(s) | ~~210~~ | ~~211~~ | 213 | 5 | 390 |
| 3rd place, bronze medalist(s) | Samvel Gasparyan (ARM) | A | 175 | ~~179~~ | ~~179~~ | 3rd place, bronze medalist(s) | ~~213~~ | ~~213~~ | 214 | 4 | 389 |
| 4 | Bekdoolot Rasulbekov (KGZ) | A | ~~165~~ | 165 | 171 | 8 | 209 | 214 | 217 | 3rd place, bronze medalist(s) | 388 |
| 5 | Irakli Chkheidze (GEO) | A | 165 | 170 | 174 | 6 | 207 | ~~212~~ | 213 | 6 | 387 |
| 6 | Artyom Antropov (KAZ) | A | ~~163~~ | 163 | ~~166~~ | 15 | 217 | 222 | ~~227~~ | 1st place, gold medalist(s) | 385 |
| 7 | Marcos Ruiz (ESP) | A | 171 | 176 | ~~178~~ | 2nd place, silver medalist(s) | 205 | ~~210~~ | ~~210~~ | 10 | 381 |
| 8 | Wesley Kitts (USA) | A | ~~164~~ | 165 | 170 | 11 | 202 | ~~207~~ | 209 | 7 | 379 |
| 9 | Vasil Marinov (BUL) | A | 170 | 174 | ~~176~~ | 4 | 203 | ~~208~~ | ~~210~~ | 11 | 377 |
| 10 | Artūrs Plēsnieks (LAT) | B | 161 | ~~165~~ | 165 | 14 | 200 | 205 | 208 | 8 | 373 |
| 11 | Won Jong-beom (KOR) | B | 161 | 165 | ~~170~~ | 13 | 200 | 207 | ~~211~~ | 9 | 372 |
| 12 | Tudor Bratu (MDA) | A | 170 | ~~175~~ | ~~175~~ | 9 | 200 | ~~205~~ | ~~207~~ | 13 | 370 |
| 13 | Sharofiddin Amriddinov (UZB) | B | 167 | 172 | ~~176~~ | 7 | 190 | 197 | ~~201~~ | 14 | 369 |
| 14 | Ryan Sester (USA) | B | 161 | 166 | ~~170~~ | 12 | 195 | 202 | ~~206~~ | 12 | 368 |
| 15 | Ali Al-Khazal (KSA) | B | 157 | 162 | ~~166~~ | 16 | 195 | ~~202~~ | ~~205~~ | 16 | 357 |
| 16 | Ahmed Abuzriba (LBA) | B | 150 | 160 | ~~165~~ | 17 | 185 | ~~191~~ | 196 | 15 | 356 |
| 17 | Aymen Touairi (ALG) | B | ~~160~~ | ~~160~~ | 160 | 18 | 190 | ~~200~~ | — | 17 | 350 |
| 18 | Josef Kolář (CZE) | B | 152 | 156 | ~~159~~ | 20 | 184 | ~~189~~ | 190 | 18 | 346 |
| 19 | Luis Lamenza (PUR) | B | 155 | ~~161~~ | ~~161~~ | 21 | ~~185~~ | ~~185~~ | 185 | 20 | 340 |
| 20 | Joshua Uikilifi (TGA) | C | 150 | 154 | ~~156~~ | 22 | 185 | ~~190~~ | ~~192~~ | 19 | 339 |
| 21 | Pierre-Alexandre Bessette (CAN) | C | 151 | ~~157~~ | 158 | 19 | ~~178~~ | 179 | ~~188~~ | 24 | 337 |
| 22 | Taniela Rainibogi (FIJ) | C | 150 | ~~155~~ | ~~155~~ | 23 | 179 | 183 | ~~188~~ | 21 | 333 |
| 23 | Karim Saadi (MEX) | C | 148 | ~~153~~ | ~~153~~ | 24 | 175 | 180 | ~~186~~ | 23 | 328 |
| 24 | James Daley (JAM) | C | 113 | 116 | 120 | 27 | ~~138~~ | ~~138~~ | 138 | 25 | 258 |
| — | David Fischerov (BUL) | A | 170 | ~~174~~ | ~~175~~ | 10 | — | — | — | — | — |
| — | Stefan Ågren (SWE) | B | ~~145~~ | 145 | ~~150~~ | 25 | ~~185~~ | ~~186~~ | ~~186~~ | — | — |
| — | Juan Prieto (PAR) | C | 130 | 136 | ~~140~~ | 26 | ~~170~~ | ~~170~~ | ~~170~~ | — | — |
| — | Döwranbek Hasanbaýew (TKM) | B | ~~171~~ | ~~173~~ | ~~173~~ | — | 182 | ~~186~~ | ~~186~~ | 22 | — |
| — | Ryunosuke Mochida (JPN) | B | ~~165~~ | ~~165~~ | ~~165~~ | — | — | — | — | — | — |
| — | Hicham Moum (MAR) | C | Did not start | | | | | | | | |
| — | Junior Ngadja Nyabeyeu (CMR) | C | Did not start | | | | | | | | |
