= 2019 World Weightlifting Championships – Men's 102 kg =

The men's 102 kg competition at the 2019 World Weightlifting Championships was held on 25 September 2019.

The "world standards" were established by the International Weightlifting Federation as the minimum lifts that would be recognized as new world records after the prior world records were discarded in a reorganization of the weight categories. They have yet to be achieved in competition.

== Schedule ==
| Date | Time | Event |
|---|---|---|
| 25 September 2019 | 12:00 | Group B |
| 25 September 2019 | 20:25 | Group A |

== Medalists ==
| Event | Gold | | Silver | | Bronze | |
|---|---|---|---|---|---|---|
| Snatch | Jin Yun-seong (KOR) | 181 kg | Yauheni Tsikhantsou (BLR) | 180 kg | Samvel Gasparyan (ARM) | 178 kg |
| Clean & Jerk | Reza Dehdar (IRI) | 219 kg | Yauheni Tsikhantsou (BLR) | 218 kg | Dmytro Chumak (UKR) | 217 kg |
| Total | Yauheni Tsikhantsou (BLR) | 398 kg | Jin Yun-seong (KOR) | 397 kg | Reza Dehdar (IRI) | 394 kg |

== Records ==
Prior to this competition, the existing world records were as follows.

| World Record | Snatch | World Standard | 191 kg | — | 1 November 2018 |
| World Record | Clean & Jerk | World Standard | 231 kg | — | 1 November 2018 |
| World Record | Total | World Standard | 412 kg | — | 1 November 2018 |

== Results ==
| Rank | Athlete | Group | Snatch (kg) | | | | Clean & Jerk (kg) | | | | Total |
| Rank | Athlete | Group | 1 | 2 | 3 | Rank | 1 | 2 | 3 | Rank | Total |
|---|---|---|---|---|---|---|---|---|---|---|---|
| 1st place, gold medalist(s) | Yauheni Tsikhantsou (BLR) | A | 175 | 180 | ~~182~~ | 2nd place, silver medalist(s) | ~~212~~ | 213 | 218 | 2nd place, silver medalist(s) | 398 |
| 2nd place, silver medalist(s) | Jin Yun-seong (KOR) | A | 176 | 181 | ~~183~~ | 1st place, gold medalist(s) | 211 | 216 | ~~219~~ | 4 | 397 |
| 3rd place, bronze medalist(s) | Reza Dehdar (IRI) | A | 167 | 172 | 175 | 6 | 208 | 217 | 219 | 1st place, gold medalist(s) | 394 |
| 4 | Dmytro Chumak (UKR) | A | ~~176~~ | ~~176~~ | 176 | 4 | 213 | ~~217~~ | 217 | 3rd place, bronze medalist(s) | 393 |
| 5 | Samvel Gasparyan (ARM) | A | 171 | 175 | 178 | 3rd place, bronze medalist(s) | 212 | ~~216~~ | ~~216~~ | 6 | 390 |
| 6 | Han Jung-hoon (KOR) | A | ~~160~~ | 160 | 164 | 10 | 205 | 214 | ~~219~~ | 5 | 378 |
| 7 | Reza Beiranvand (IRI) | A | 170 | ~~175~~ | ~~176~~ | 7 | 206 | ~~214~~ | ~~216~~ | 8 | 376 |
| 8 | Aleksandr Kibanov (RUS) | A | 158 | 163 | 167 | 9 | 199 | 204 | 209 | 7 | 376 |
| 9 | Andrei Arlionak (BLR) | A | 168 | 171 | 175 | 5 | 195 | 200 | ~~203~~ | 12 | 375 |
| 10 | Irakli Chkheidze (GEO) | A | 163 | ~~167~~ | ~~167~~ | 11 | 198 | 204 | ~~213~~ | 10 | 367 |
| 11 | Artur Mugurdumov (ISR) | B | ~~155~~ | 156 | 160 | 12 | 193 | 198 | 205 | 9 | 365 |
| 12 | Sunnatilla Usarov (UZB) | A | 168 | ~~173~~ | ~~173~~ | 8 | 190 | 195 | ~~200~~ | 14 | 363 |
| 13 | Kostiantyn Reva (UKR) | A | ~~158~~ | 158 | ~~163~~ | 14 | 200 | ~~208~~ | ~~208~~ | 11 | 358 |
| 14 | Resul Elvan (TUR) | B | 154 | 158 | ~~162~~ | 13 | 192 | ~~196~~ | 198 | 13 | 356 |
| 15 | Leho Pent (EST) | B | 150 | ~~154~~ | 156 | 15 | 190 | ~~195~~ | ~~196~~ | 15 | 346 |
| 16 | Jiří Gasior (CZE) | B | 144 | 148 | 150 | 17 | 185 | ~~191~~ | ~~191~~ | 16 | 335 |
| 17 | Simon Darville (DEN) | B | 140 | 145 | 148 | 18 | 175 | 180 | ~~185~~ | 17 | 328 |
| 18 | Hernán Viera (PER) | B | 130 | 135 | 138 | 19 | 170 | 175 | ~~190~~ | 18 | 313 |
| 19 | Seamus O'Conchubhair (IRL) | B | 125 | ~~130~~ | 130 | 21 | 163 | 168 | 171 | 19 | 301 |
| 20 | Ruben Burger (RSA) | B | ~~130~~ | 130 | ~~135~~ | 20 | 160 | 165 | 170 | 20 | 300 |
| — | Mohanad Abdul-Hasan (IRQ) | B | ~~152~~ | 152 | ~~156~~ | 16 | ~~190~~ | ~~192~~ | ~~192~~ | — | — |
| — | Bokang Kagiso (BOT) | B | ~~135~~ | ~~135~~ | ~~135~~ | — | — | — | — | — | — |
