= Weightlifting at the 2022 Asian Games – Men's 109 kg =

Men's 109 kg at the 2022 Asian Games
- Venue: Xiaoshan Sports Center Gymnasium
- Date: 5–6 October 2023
- Competitors: 12 from 9 nations

Medalists
gold medal	Liu Huanhua	China
silver medal	Akbar Djuraev	Uzbekistan
bronze medal	Ruslan Nurudinov	Uzbekistan

The men's 109 kilograms competition at the 2022 Asian Games took place on 5 and 6 October 2023 at Xiaoshan Sports Center Gymnasium.

== Schedule ==
All times are China Standard Time (UTC+08:00)

Date	Time	Event
Thursday, 5 October 2023	10:00	Group B
Friday, 6 October 2023	15:00	Group A

== Records ==
Prior to this competition, the existing world, Asian and Games records were as follows.

World Record	Snatch	Yang Zhe (CHN)	200 kg	Tashkent, Uzbekistan	24 April 2021
World Record	Clean & Jerk	Ruslan Nurudinov (UZB)	241 kg	Tashkent, Uzbekistan	24 April 2021
World Record	Total	Simon Martirosyan (ARM)	435 kg	Ashgabat, Turkmenistan	9 November 2018
Asian Record	Snatch	Yang Zhe (CHN)	200 kg	Tashkent, Uzbekistan	24 April 2021
Asian Record	Clean & Jerk	Ruslan Nurudinov (UZB)	241 kg	Tashkent, Uzbekistan	24 April 2021
Asian Record	Total	Akbar Djuraev (UZB)	433 kg	Tashkent, Uzbekistan	16 December 2021
Games Record	Snatch	Asian Games Standard	190 kg	—	1 November 2018
Games Record	Clean & Jerk	Asian Games Standard	227 kg	—	1 November 2018
Games Record	Total	Asian Games Standard	411 kg	—	1 November 2018

== Results ==
Legend

- NM — No mark

Rank	Athlete	Group	Snatch (kg)				Clean & Jerk (kg)				Total
Rank	Athlete	Group	1	2	3	Result	1	2	3	Result	Total
1st place, gold medalist(s)	Liu Huanhua (CHN)	A	~~175~~	180	185	185	215	227	233	233	418
2nd place, silver medalist(s)	Akbar Djuraev (UZB)	A	180	184	189	189	~~220~~	222	228	228	417
3rd place, bronze medalist(s)	Ruslan Nurudinov (UZB)	A	~~175~~	175	~~178~~	175	216	—	—	216	391
4	Jang Yeon-hak (KOR)	A	~~175~~	175	180	180	~~210~~	210	~~216~~	210	390
5	Mehdi Karami (IRI)	A	170	~~176~~	~~176~~	170	~~210~~	210	~~222~~	210	380
6	Ali Al-Khazal (KSA)	B	150	155	~~160~~	155	180	—	—	180	335
7	Asem Al-Sallaj (JOR)	B	135	140	~~147~~	140	180	185	188	188	328
8	Usman Amjad Rathore (PAK)	B	~~130~~	130	~~135~~	130	160	172	176	176	306
—	Salwan Jasim (IRQ)	A	~~175~~	~~175~~	175	175	~~211~~	~~211~~	~~217~~	—	NM
—	Reza Dehdar (IRI)	A	~~169~~	~~170~~	~~175~~	—	—	—	—	—	NM
—	Jin Yun-seong (KOR)	A	~~170~~	~~170~~	~~170~~	—	—	—	—	—	NM
—	Döwranbek Hasanbaýew (TKM)	A	~~175~~	~~178~~	~~178~~	—	—	—	—	—	NM

== New records ==
The following records were established during the competition.

Clean & Jerk	228	Akbar Djuraev (UZB)	GR
Clean & Jerk	233	Liu Huanhua (CHN)	GR
Total	412	Liu Huanhua (CHN)	GR
Total	417	Akbar Djuraev (UZB)	GR
Total	418	Liu Huanhua (CHN)	GR
