= Rasoul Motamedi =

Iranian weightlifter (born 1998)

Personal information
- Nationality: Iranian
- Born: 9 November 1998 (age 28)
- Weight: 101.70 kg (224 lb)

Sport
- Country: Iran
- Sport: Weightlifting
- Event: 102 kg

Achievements and titles
- Personal bests: Snatch: 180 kg (2022); Clean and jerk: 227 kg (2021); Total: 400 kg (2021)
Medal record
Representing Iran
Men's weightlifting
World Championships
Gold medal – first place	2021 Tashkent	102 kg
Asian Championships
Gold medal – first place	2020 Tashkent	102 kg
Gold medal – first place	2022 Manama	109 kg
Islamic Solidarity Games
Gold medal – first place	2021 Konya	102 kg

Rasoul Motamedi (Persian: رسول معتمدی, born 9 November 1998) is an Iranian weightlifter. He won the gold medal in the men's 102 kg event at the 2021 World Weightlifting Championships held in Tashkent, Uzbekistan. He also won a gold medal at the 2020 Asian Weightlifting Championships in the 102 kg weight division.

He won the gold medal in the men's 109 kg event at the 2022 Asian Weightlifting Championships held in Manama, Bahrain. He was unable to compete at the 2022 World Weightlifting Championships due to injury.

== Major results ==
Year	Venue	Weight	Snatch (kg)				Clean & Jerk (kg)				Total	Rank
Year	Venue	Weight	1	2	3	Rank	1	2	3	Rank	Total	Rank
World Championships
2021	Tashkent, Uzbekistan	102 kg	~~170~~	170	177	2nd place, silver medalist(s)	215	~~220~~	220	1st place, gold medalist(s)	397	1st place, gold medalist(s)
2023	Riyadh, Saudi Arabia	102 kg	145	151	157	25	185	192	201	22	358	23
Asian Championships
2021	Tashkent, Uzbekistan	102 kg	~~166~~	166	173	3rd place, bronze medalist(s)	210	220	227	1st place, gold medalist(s)	400	1st place, gold medalist(s)
2022	Manama, Bahrain	109 kg	170	174	180	1st place, gold medalist(s)	215	217	--	1st place, gold medalist(s)	397	1st place, gold medalist(s)
Islamic Solidarity Games
2022	Konya, Turkey	102 kg	171	~~175~~	177	1st place, gold medalist(s)	217	223	~~232~~	1st place, gold medalist(s)	400	1st place, gold medalist(s)
Junior World Championships
2018	Tashkent, Uzbekistan	94 kg	151	~~158~~	~~158~~	9	193	~~200~~	202	3rd place, bronze medalist(s)	353	4
