= Ahmed Abuzriba =

Libyan weightlifter (born 2000)

Personal information
- Born: 16 April 2000 (age 26)

Sport
- Country: Libya
- Sport: Weightlifting
- Weight class: 102 kg
- Club: Al-Suwaihli Sports Club
Medal record
Men's weightlifting
Representing Libya
African Games
Silver medal – second place	2023 Accra	102 kg
African Championships
Gold medal – first place	2021 Nairobi	96 kg
Gold medal – first place	2022 Cairo	102 kg
Gold medal – first place	2024 Ismailia	96 kg

Ahmed Abuzriba (born 16 April 2000) is a Libyan weightlifter. He was a medalist at the 2023 African Games.

== Career ==
He won a bronze medal at the 2019 African Weightlifting Championships in Cairo.

He won three gold medals in the 96kg division at the 2021 African Weightlifting Championships in Nairobi, Kenya, winning the snatch, the clean and jerk and the overall.

Competing in the Weightlifting at the 2023 African Games, he was medalist in the 102kg division, in Accra, Ghana in March 2024, winning two silver medals and a bronze. However, during the event he also had to helped by officials after an attributed his collapse to the fatigue caused by fasting on the second day of Ramadan.

He won a bronze medal at the World Powerlifting Championships in June 2024.

He was selected for the 2024 Paris Olympics in the Men's 102 kg division. He lifted 164 kg in the Snatch failing two attempts and didn't return to take part in the Clean & Jerk.

== Major results ==
Year	Venue	Weight	Snatch (kg)				Clean & Jerk (kg)				Total	Rank
Year	Venue	Weight	1	2	3	Rank	1	2	3	Rank	Total	Rank
Olympic Games
2024	Paris, France	102 kg	164	~~169~~	~~170~~	—N/a	—	—	—	—N/a	DNF	—
World Championships
2019	Pattaya, Thailand	89 kg	141	~~146~~	~~148~~	21	170	176	179	21	320	21
2022	Bogotá, Colombia	102 kg	150	160	~~165~~	17	185	~~191~~	196	15	356	16
IWF World Cup
2024	Phuket, Thailand	102 kg	158	163	~~169~~	21	192	198	~~201~~	18	361	16
African Games
2019	Rabat, Morocco	89 kg	147	~~149~~	~~150~~	4	178	~~181~~	~~182~~	5	325	5
2024	Accra, Ghana	102 kg	149	153	—	2nd place, silver medalist(s)	181	189	—	3rd place, bronze medalist(s)	342	2nd place, silver medalist(s)
African Championships
2019	Cairo, Egypt	89 kg	138	145	~~149~~	4	174	~~178~~	~~178~~	3rd place, bronze medalist(s)	319	4
2021	Nairobi, Kenya	96 kg	143	147	150	1st place, gold medalist(s)	177	181	186	1st place, gold medalist(s)	336	1st place, gold medalist(s)
2022	Cairo, Egypt	102 kg	158	164	~~170~~	2nd place, silver medalist(s)	192	198	205	1st place, gold medalist(s)	369	1st place, gold medalist(s)
2023	Tunis, Tunisia	102 kg	~~130~~	—	—	—	~~180~~	—	—	—	—	—
2024	Ismailia, Egypt	96 kg	142	147	152	1st place, gold medalist(s)	173	180	182	1st place, gold medalist(s)	334	1st place, gold medalist(s)
