= Reza Dehdar =

Iranian weightlifter (born 1995)

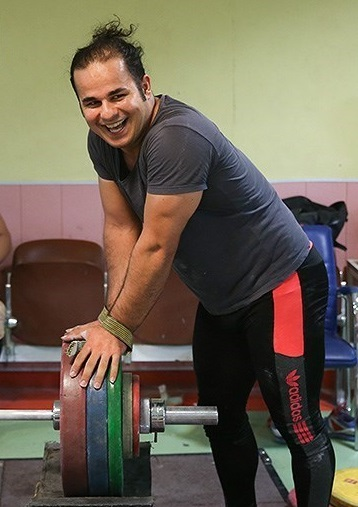

Personal information
- Nationality: Iranian
- Born: 2 July 1995 (age 30) Ramhormoz, Iran
- Weight: 97.65 kg (215 lb)

Sport
- Country: Iran
- Sport: Weightlifting
- Event: –102 kg
Medal record
Men's weightlifting
Representing Iran
World Championships
Silver medal – second place	2022 Bogotá	102 kg
Bronze medal – third place	2019 Pattaya	102 kg
Asian Championships
Silver medal – second place	2022 Manama	102 kg

Reza Dehdar (Persian: رضا دهدار, born 2 July 1995 in Ramhormoz) is an Iranian weightlifter. He won the silver medal in the men's 102 kg event at the 2022 World Weightlifting Championships held in Bogotá, Colombia. He won a bronze medal at the 2019 World Weightlifting Championships.

== Major results ==
Year	Venue	Weight	Snatch (kg)				Clean & Jerk (kg)				Total	Rank
Year	Venue	Weight	1	2	3	Rank	1	2	3	Rank	Total	Rank
World Championships
2019	Pattaya, Thailand	102 kg	167	172	175	6	208	217	219	1st place, gold medalist(s)	394	3rd place, bronze medalist(s)
2022	Bogotá, Colombia	102 kg	168	173	177	1st place, gold medalist(s)	~~210~~	~~211~~	213	5	390	2nd place, silver medalist(s)
2023	Riyadh, Saudi Arabia	102 kg	173	~~179~~	~~179~~	10	213	~~218~~	~~222~~	7	386	9
Asian Games
2023	Hangzhou, China	109 kg	~~169~~	~~170~~	~~175~~	--	--	--	--	--	--	--
Asian Championships
2021	Tashkent, Uzbekistan	102 kg	166	172	175	1st place, gold medalist(s)	206	214	~~219~~	4	389	4
2022	Manama, Bahrain	102 kg	170	~~176~~	~~176~~	3rd place, bronze medalist(s)	202	~~221~~	~~222~~	2nd place, silver medalist(s)	372	2nd place, silver medalist(s)
2023	Jinju, South Korea	102 kg	166	172	~~179~~	6	204	211	~~221~~	4	383	5
