= Weightlifting at the 2020 Summer Olympics – Men's 96 kg =

Men's 96 kg at the Games of the XXXII Olympiad
- Venue: Tokyo International Forum
- Date: 31 July 2021
- Competitors: 15 from 15 nations
- Winning total: 402 kg OR

Medalists
1st place, gold medalist(s)		Fares Ibrahim	Qatar
2nd place, silver medalist(s)		Keydomar Vallenilla	Venezuela
3rd place, bronze medalist(s)		Anton Pliesnoi	Georgia

The men's 96 kg weightlifting competitions at the 2020 Summer Olympics in Tokyo took place on 31 July at the Tokyo International Forum. The weightlifter from Qatar won the gold, with a combined lift of 402 kg.

== Records ==
{{{caption}}}
World Record	Snatch	Sohrab Moradi (IRI)	186 kg	Ashgabat, Turkmenistan	7 November 2018
World Record	Clean & Jerk	Tian Tao (CHN)	231 kg	Tokyo, Japan	7 July 2019
World Record	Total	Sohrab Moradi (IRI)	416 kg	Ashgabat, Turkmenistan	7 November 2018
Olympic Record	Snatch	Olympic Standard	183 kg	—	1 November 2018
Olympic Record	Clean & Jerk	Olympic Standard	219 kg	—	1 November 2018
Olympic Record	Total	Olympic Standard	398 kg	—	1 November 2018

== Results ==
Rank	Athlete	Nation	Group	Body weight	Snatch (kg)				Clean & Jerk (kg)				Total
Rank	Athlete	Nation	Group	Body weight	1	2	3	Result	1	2	3	Result	Total
1st place, gold medalist(s)	Fares El-Bakh	Qatar	A	95.70	173	~~177~~	177	177	217	225	~~232~~	225 OR	402 OR
2nd place, silver medalist(s)	Keydomar Vallenilla	Venezuela	A	95.00	172	175	177	177	210	~~215~~	~~216~~	210	387
3rd place, bronze medalist(s)	Anton Pliesnoi	Georgia	A	96.00	173	~~177~~	177	177	206	~~210~~	210	210	387
4	Boady Santavy	Canada	A	95.40	173	~~177~~	178	178	200	~~205~~	208	208	386
5	Chen Po-jen	Chinese Taipei	A	95.85	171	176	~~180~~	176	200	205	~~211~~	205	381
6	Bekdoolot Rasulbekov	Kyrgyzstan	A	95.70	162	~~166~~	166	166	200	208	~~216~~	208	374
7	Bartłomiej Adamus	Poland	A	95.95	~~160~~	160	163	163	197	~~204~~	~~205~~	197	360
8	Yu Dong-ju	South Korea	A	92.55	160	~~165~~	~~167~~	160	200	~~205~~	~~205~~	200	360
9	Olfides Sáez	Cuba	B	92.35	156	~~161~~	~~161~~	156	193	198	203	203	359
10	Cyrille Tchatchet II	Refugee Olympic Team	B	95.45	~~153~~	155	~~160~~	155	~~190~~	190	195	195	350
11	Theodoros Iakovidis	Greece	B	91.90	147	152	156	156	175	182	~~191~~	182	338
12	Christian Amoah	Ghana	B		140	~~145~~	145	145	165	~~170~~	170	170	315
13	Mohammed Hamada	Palestine	B		137	~~142~~	~~142~~	137	173	~~178~~	~~178~~	173	310
—	Yauheni Tsikhantsou	Belarus	A	95.35	~~170~~	~~170~~	173	173	~~201~~	~~201~~	~~201~~	—	—
—	Toshiki Yamamoto	Japan	A	96.00	161	166	168	168	~~200~~	~~200~~	~~200~~	—	—

== New records ==
Clean & Jerk	225 kg	Fares El-Bakh (QAT)	OR
Total	402 kg	Fares El-Bakh (QAT)	OR
