= Bekdoolot Rasulbekov =

Kyrgyzstani weightlifter (born 1996)

Personal information
- Born: 1996 (age 29–30) Toktogul, Kyrgyzstan

Sport
- Country: Kyrgyzstan
- Sport: Weightlifting
Medal record
Men's weightlifting
Representing Kyrgyzstan
Islamic Solidarity Games
Bronze medal – third place	2021 Konya	102 kg
Asian Championships
Silver medal – second place	2022 Manama	109 kg
Silver medal – second place	2024 Tashkent	102 kg

Bekdoolot Rasulbekov (born 1996) is a Kyrgyzstani weightlifter. He won the bronze medal in the men's 102 kg event at the 2021 Islamic Solidarity Games held in Konya, Turkey. He represented Kyrgyzstan at the 2020 Summer Olympics in Tokyo, Japan. He competed in the men's 96 kg event.

== Career ==
He represented Kyrgyzstan at the 2018 Asian Games held in Jakarta, Indonesia in the men's 94 kg event. In 2019, he competed in the men's 96 kg event at the World Weightlifting Championships held in Pattaya, Thailand.

In 2021, he competed at the 2020 Asian Weightlifting Championships held in Tashkent, Uzbekistan. He finished in 4th place in the men's 102 kg event at the 2021 World Weightlifting Championships held in Tashkent, Uzbekistan.

He won the silver medal in his event at the 2022 Asian Weightlifting Championships held in Manama, Bahrain. He won the bronze medal in the men's 102 kg Clean & Jerk event at the 2022 World Weightlifting Championships held in Bogotá, Colombia.

== Achievements ==
Year	Venue	Weight	Snatch (kg)				Clean & Jerk (kg)				Total	Rank
Year	Venue	Weight	1	2	3	Rank	1	2	3	Rank	Total	Rank
Summer Olympics
2021	Tokyo, Japan	96 kg	162	~~166~~	166	—N/a	200	208	~~216~~	—N/a	374	6
