= Jin Yun-seong =

South Korean weightlifter (born 1995)

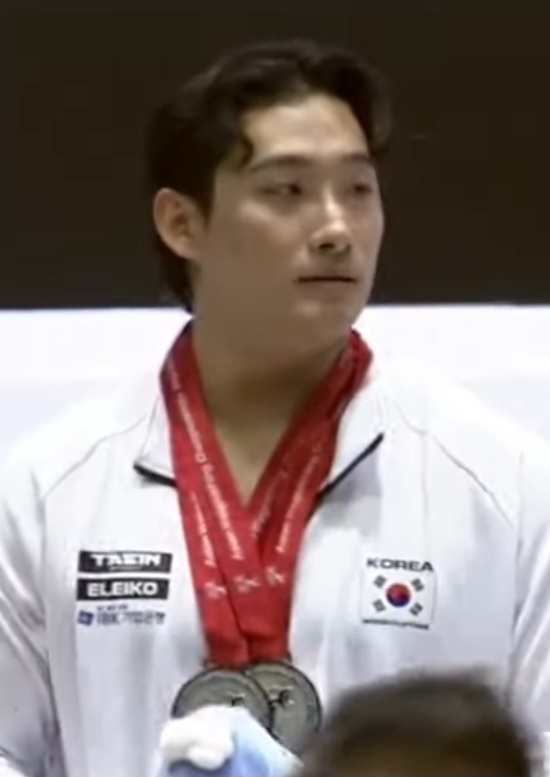

Personal information
- Nationality: South Korean
- Born: 11 October 1995 (age 31) Seocheon, Chungcheongnam-do, South Korea
- Weight: 101.90 kg (225 lb)

Sport
- Country: South Korea
- Sport: Weightlifting
- Event: –102 kg
- Club: Goyang City Hall

Achievements and titles
- Personal bests: Snatch: 181 kg (2019); Clean and jerk: 220 kg (2021); Total: 400 kg (2021)
Medal record
Men's weightlifting
Representing South Korea
World Championships
Silver medal – second place	2019 Pattaya	–102 kg
Silver medal – second place	2021 Tashkent	–102 kg
Asian Championships
Silver medal – second place	2023 Jinju	–102 kg
Bronze medal – third place	2016 Tashkent	–94 kg

Jin Yun-seong (born 11 October 1995) is a South Korean weightlifter. He is a two-time silver medalist at the World Weightlifting Championships.

== Career ==
He won a medal at the 2019 World Weightlifting Championships.

He won the silver medal in the men's 102 kg event at the 2021 World Weightlifting Championships held in Tashkent, Uzbekistan.

== Major results ==
Year	Venue	Weight	Snatch (kg)				Clean & Jerk (kg)				Total	Rank
Year	Venue	Weight	1	2	3	Rank	1	2	3	Rank	Total	Rank
Olympic Games
2021	Tokyo, Japan	109 kg	180	~~185~~	~~185~~	5	220	~~225~~	~~230~~	5	400	6
World Championships
2017	Anaheim, United States	105 kg	~~176~~	~~176~~	180	5	207	~~215~~	~~215~~	12	387	9
2019	Pattaya, Thailand	102 kg	176	181	~~183~~	1st place, gold medalist(s)	211	216	~~219~~	4	397	2nd place, silver medalist(s)
2021	Tashkent, Uzbekistan	102 kg	176	180	~~183~~	1st place, gold medalist(s)	~~216~~	216	~~220~~	4	396	2nd place, silver medalist(s)
Asian Games
2026	Nagoya, Japan	110 kg	~~165~~	165	171	—N/a	195	~~200~~	~~201~~	—N/a	366	6
Asian Championships
2016	Tashkent, Uzbekistan	94 kg	165	~~168~~	168	2nd place, silver medalist(s)	195	~~200~~	200	3rd place, bronze medalist(s)	368	3rd place, bronze medalist(s)
2021	Tashkent, Uzbekistan	109 kg	~~180~~	180	~~183~~	4	220	~~223~~	~~224~~	4	400	4
2023	Jinju, South Korea	102 kg	175	~~180~~	180	5	213	218	~~221~~	2nd place, silver medalist(s)	398	2nd place, silver medalist(s)
