= 2021 World Weightlifting Championships =

- Host city: Tashkent, Uzbekistan
- Dates: 7–17 December
- Main venue: Uzbekistan Sports Complex

The 2021 World Weightlifting Championships was a weightlifting competition held from 7 to 17 December in Tashkent, Uzbekistan.

Due to concerns about the rapid spread of Omicron variant and held shortly after Olympics and Chinese National Games, the tournament faced the absence of many strong competitors. 10 Olympic champions from Tokyo four months earlier, 15 world champion title holders, and entire teams from China, North Korea, Italy and Germany decided not to compete. Weightlifters competing at the event were exempt from the required quarantine when visiting Uzbekistan.

The event was also designated the 2021 Commonwealth Weightlifting Championships, with places in the 2022 Commonwealth Games awarded to the best Commonwealth lifter (totals only, as per the Olympics) in each eligible division.

== Medal summary ==
=== Men ===
Event	Gold		Silver		Bronze	
55 kg
Snatch	Mansour Al-Saleem; Saudi Arabia	118 kg	Arli Chontey; Kazakhstan	118 kg	Muammer Şahin; Turkey	116 kg
Clean & Jerk	Angel Rusev; Bulgaria	144 kg	Aniq Kasdan; Malaysia	142 kg	Arli Chontey; Kazakhstan	142 kg
Total	Arli Chontey; Kazakhstan	260 kg	Thada Somboon-uan; Thailand	256 kg	Angel Rusev; Bulgaria	254 kg
61 kg
Snatch	Shin Rok; South Korea	132 kg	Shota Mishvelidze; Georgia	131 kg	Seýitjan Mirzaýew; Turkmenistan	128 kg
Clean & Jerk	Shin Rok; South Korea	156 kg	Shota Mishvelidze; Georgia	155 kg	Seraj Al-Saleem; Saudi Arabia	155 kg
Total	Shin Rok; South Korea	288 kg	Shota Mishvelidze; Georgia	286 kg	Seraj Al-Saleem; Saudi Arabia	282 kg
67 kg
Snatch	Zulfat Garaev; Russian Weightlifting Federation	146 kg	Doston Yokubov; Uzbekistan	144 kg	Talha Talib; Pakistan	143 kg
Clean & Jerk	Doston Yokubov; Uzbekistan	180 kg	Francisco Mosquera; Colombia	179 kg	Adkhamjon Ergashev; Uzbekistan	174 kg
Total	Doston Yokubov; Uzbekistan	324 kg	Francisco Mosquera; Colombia	316 kg	Zulfat Garaev; Russian Weightlifting Federation	315 kg
73 kg
Snatch	Briken Calja; Albania	156 kg	Suttipong Jeeram; Thailand	154 kg	Sergey Petrov; Russian Weightlifting Federation	153 kg
Clean & Jerk	Rahmat Erwin Abdullah; Indonesia	192 kg	Briken Calja; Albania	186 kg	Jeong Han-sol; South Korea	181 kg
Total	Rahmat Erwin Abdullah; Indonesia	343 kg	Briken Calja; Albania	342 kg	Suttipong Jeeram; Thailand	334 kg
81 kg
Snatch	Marin Robu; Moldova	168 kg	Karlos Nasar; Bulgaria	166 kg	Mirmostafa Javadi; Iran	163 kg
Clean & Jerk	Karlos Nasar; Bulgaria	208 kg WR	Mirmostafa Javadi; Iran	204 kg	Kim Woo-jae; South Korea	196 kg
Total	Karlos Nasar; Bulgaria	374 kg	Mirmostafa Javadi; Iran	367 kg	Marin Robu; Moldova	363 kg
89 kg
Snatch	Andranik Karapetyan; Armenia	175 kg	Revaz Davitadze; Georgia	171 kg	Yu Dong-ju; South Korea	167 kg
Clean & Jerk	Artem Okulov; Russian Weightlifting Federation	205 kg	Sarvarbek Zafarjonov; Uzbekistan	205 kg	Yu Dong-ju; South Korea	204 kg
Total	Yu Dong-ju; South Korea	371 kg	Sarvarbek Zafarjonov; Uzbekistan	371 kg	Revaz Davitadze; Georgia	370 kg
96 kg
Snatch	Lesman Paredes; Colombia	187 kg WR	Boady Santavy; Canada	178 kg	Keydomar Vallenilla; Venezuela	177 kg
Clean & Jerk	Fares El-Bakh; Qatar	222 kg	Artyom Antropov; Kazakhstan	221 kg	Keydomar Vallenilla; Venezuela	214 kg
Total	Lesman Paredes; Colombia	400 kg	Fares El-Bakh; Qatar	394 kg	Keydomar Vallenilla; Venezuela	391 kg
102 kg
Snatch	Jin Yun-seong; South Korea	180 kg	Rasoul Motamedi; Iran	177 kg	Samvel Gasparyan; Armenia	175 kg
Clean & Jerk	Rasoul Motamedi; Iran	220 kg	Bekdoolot Rasulbekov; Kyrgyzstan	217 kg	Amir Hoghoughi; Iran	216 kg
Total	Rasoul Motamedi; Iran	397 kg	Jin Yun-seong; South Korea	396 kg	Amir Hoghoughi; Iran	388 kg
109 kg
Snatch	Akbar Djuraev; Uzbekistan	195 kg	Simon Martirosyan; Armenia	188 kg	Ruslan Nurudinov; Uzbekistan	185 kg
Clean & Jerk	Akbar Djuraev; Uzbekistan	238 kg	Ruslan Nurudinov; Uzbekistan	236 kg	Simon Martirosyan; Armenia	228 kg
Total	Akbar Djuraev; Uzbekistan	433 kg AR	Ruslan Nurudinov; Uzbekistan	421 kg	Simon Martirosyan; Armenia	416 kg
+109 kg
Snatch	Lasha Talakhadze; Georgia	225 kg WR	Varazdat Lalayan; Armenia	211 kg	Eduard Ziaziulin; Belarus	206 kg
Clean & Jerk	Lasha Talakhadze; Georgia	267 kg WR	Varazdat Lalayan; Armenia	246 kg	Gor Minasyan; Armenia	243 kg
Total	Lasha Talakhadze; Georgia	492 kg WR	Varazdat Lalayan; Armenia	457 kg	Gor Minasyan; Armenia	448 kg

=== Women ===
Event	Gold		Silver		Bronze	
45 kg
Snatch	Thanyathon Sukcharoen; Thailand	77 kg	Şaziye Erdoğan; Turkey	76 kg	Manuela Berrío; Colombia	75 kg
Clean & Jerk	Manuela Berrío; Colombia	95 kg	Thanyathon Sukcharoen; Thailand	95 kg	Şaziye Erdoğan; Turkey	93 kg
Total	Thanyathon Sukcharoen; Thailand	172 kg	Manuela Berrío; Colombia	170 kg	Şaziye Erdoğan; Turkey	169 kg
49 kg
Snatch	Surodchana Khambao; Thailand	86 kg	Rira Suzuki; Japan	78 kg	Ýulduz Jumabaýewa; Turkmenistan	76 kg
Clean & Jerk	Surodchana Khambao; Thailand	105 kg	Ibuki Takahashi; Japan	101 kg	Rira Suzuki; Japan	101 kg
Total	Surodchana Khambao; Thailand	191 kg	Rira Suzuki; Japan	179 kg	Ibuki Takahashi; Japan	172 kg
55 kg
Snatch	Ghofrane Belkhir; Tunisia	92 kg	Svitlana Samuliak; Ukraine	91 kg	Adijat Olarinoye; Nigeria	90 kg
Clean & Jerk	Bindyarani Devi; India	114 kg	Ham Eun-ji; South Korea	114 kg	Adijat Olarinoye; Nigeria	113 kg
Total	Ghofrane Belkhir; Tunisia	203 kg	Adijat Olarinoye; Nigeria	203 kg	Svitlana Samuliak; Ukraine	201 kg
59 kg
Snatch	Mariia Hanhur; Ukraine	101 kg	Kuo Hsing-chun; Chinese Taipei	100 kg	Olga Te; Russian Weightlifting Federation	100 kg
Clean & Jerk	Kuo Hsing-chun; Chinese Taipei	130 kg	Yenny Álvarez; Colombia	127 kg	Rosivé Silgado; Colombia	120 kg
Total	Kuo Hsing-chun; Chinese Taipei	230 kg	Yenny Álvarez; Colombia	226 kg	Olga Te; Russian Weightlifting Federation	218 kg
64 kg
Snatch	Neama Said; Egypt	106 kg	Han Ji-an; South Korea	99 kg	Chen Wen-huei; Chinese Taipei	97 kg
Clean & Jerk	Chen Wen-huei; Chinese Taipei	135 kg	Neama Said; Egypt	127 kg	Anastasia Anzorova; Russian Weightlifting Federation	121 kg
Total	Neama Said; Egypt	233 kg	Chen Wen-huei; Chinese Taipei	232 kg	Park Min-kyung; South Korea	217 kg
71 kg
Snatch	Evgeniia Guseva; Russian Weightlifting Federation	104 kg	Olivia Reeves; United States	104 kg	Patricia Strenius; Sweden	104 kg
Clean & Jerk	Meredith Alwine; United States	135 kg	Sarah Davies; Great Britain	132 kg	Joy Ogbonne Eze; Nigeria	130 kg
Total	Meredith Alwine; United States	235 kg	Sarah Davies; Great Britain	234 kg	Patricia Strenius; Sweden	231 kg
76 kg
Snatch	Iana Sotieva; Russian Weightlifting Federation	112 kg	Laura Amaro; Brazil	108 kg	Mattie Rogers; United States	107 kg
Clean & Jerk	Lee Min-ji; South Korea	139 kg	Mattie Rogers; United States	136 kg	Kim Su-hyeon; South Korea	134 kg
Total	Lee Min-ji; South Korea	244 kg	Mattie Rogers; United States	243 kg	Iana Sotieva; Russian Weightlifting Federation	242 kg
81 kg
Snatch	Alina Marushchak; Ukraine	113 kg	Kim I-seul; South Korea	108 kg	Eileen Cikamatana; Australia	108 kg
Clean & Jerk	Alina Marushchak; Ukraine	135 kg	Valeria Rivas; Colombia	134 kg	Dayana Chirinos; Venezuela	134 kg
Total	Alina Marushchak; Ukraine	248 kg	Valeria Rivas; Colombia	239 kg	Kim I-seul; South Korea	238 kg
87 kg
Snatch	Tursunoy Jabborova; Uzbekistan	113 kg	Mönkhjantsangiin Ankhtsetseg; Mongolia	109 kg	Amanda Schott; Brazil	106 kg
Clean & Jerk	Solfrid Koanda; Norway	141 kg	Mönkhjantsangiin Ankhtsetseg; Mongolia	141 kg	Daria Akhmerova; Russian Weightlifting Federation	135 kg
Total	Mönkhjantsangiin Ankhtsetseg; Mongolia	250 kg	Tursunoy Jabborova; Uzbekistan	244 kg	Solfrid Koanda; Norway	244 kg
+87 kg
Snatch	Duangaksorn Chaidee; Thailand	124 kg	Son Young-hee; South Korea	123 kg	Emily Campbell; Great Britain	121 kg
Clean & Jerk	Son Young-hee; South Korea	159 kg	Emily Campbell; Great Britain	157 kg	Duangaksorn Chaidee; Thailand	157 kg
Total	Son Young-hee; South Korea	282 kg	Duangaksorn Chaidee; Thailand	281 kg	Emily Campbell; Great Britain	278 kg

== Medal table ==
Ranking by Big (Total result) medals

Rank	Nation	Gold	Silver	Bronze	Total
1	South Korea	4	1	2	7
2	Uzbekistan	2	3	0	5
3	Thailand	2	2	1	5
4	Colombia	1	4	0	5
5	Georgia	1	1	1	3
5	Iran	1	1	1	3
7	Chinese Taipei	1	1	0	2
7	United States	1	1	0	2
9	Bulgaria	1	0	1	2
9	Ukraine	1	0	1	2
11	Egypt	1	0	0	1
11	Indonesia	1	0	0	1
11	Kazakhstan	1	0	0	1
11	Mongolia	1	0	0	1
11	Tunisia	1	0	0	1
16	Armenia	0	1	2	3
17	Great Britain	0	1	1	2
17	Japan	0	1	1	2
19	Albania	0	1	0	1
19	Nigeria	0	1	0	1
19	Qatar	0	1	0	1
22	Russian Weightlifting Federation	0	0	3	3
23	Moldova	0	0	1	1
23	Norway	0	0	1	1
23	Saudi Arabia	0	0	1	1
23	Sweden	0	0	1	1
23	Turkey	0	0	1	1
23	Venezuela	0	0	1	1
Totals (28 entries)		20	20	20	60

Ranking by all medals: Big (Total result) and Small (Snatch and Clean & Jerk)

Rank	Nation	Gold	Silver	Bronze	Total
1	South Korea	9	5	7	21
2	Uzbekistan	6	6	2	14
3	Thailand	6	4	2	12
4	Ukraine	4	1	1	6
5	Russian Weightlifting Federation	4	0	7	11
6	Colombia	3	7	2	12
7	Georgia	3	4	1	8
8	Chinese Taipei	3	2	1	6
9	Bulgaria	3	1	1	5
10	Iran	2	3	3	8
11	United States	2	3	1	6
12	Egypt	2	1	0	3
13	Indonesia	2	0	0	2
13	Tunisia	2	0	0	2
15	Armenia	1	4	5	10
16	Kazakhstan	1	2	1	4
17	Albania	1	2	0	3
17	Mongolia	1	2	0	3
19	Qatar	1	1	0	2
20	Saudi Arabia	1	0	2	3
21	Moldova	1	0	1	2
21	Norway	1	0	1	2
23	India	1	0	0	1
24	Great Britain	0	3	2	5
24	Japan	0	3	2	5
26	Nigeria	0	1	3	4
26	Turkey	0	1	3	4
28	Brazil	0	1	1	2
29	Canada	0	1	0	1
29	Kyrgyzstan	0	1	0	1
29	Malaysia	0	1	0	1
32	Venezuela	0	0	4	4
33	Sweden	0	0	2	2
33	Turkmenistan	0	0	2	2
35	Australia	0	0	1	1
35	Belarus	0	0	1	1
35	Pakistan	0	0	1	1
Totals (37 entries)		60	60	60	180

== Team ranking ==
=== Men ===
Rank	Team	Points
1	Russian Weightlifting Federation	581
2	Iran	548
3	Uzbekistan	525
4	Georgia	520
5	Colombia	490
6	Armenia	428

=== Women ===
Rank	Team	Points
1	Russian Weightlifting Federation	507
2	South Korea	498
3	India	442
4	Indonesia	380
5	United States	356
6	Thailand	338

== Participating nations ==
A total of 414 competitors from 72 nations participated.

- Albania (5)
- Algeria (2)
- Armenia (10)
- Australia (8)
- Austria (1)
- Bangladesh (2)
- Belarus (4)
- Belgium (2)
- Brazil (3)
- Bulgaria (5)
- Cameroon (4)
- Canada (13)
- Chinese Taipei (10)
- Colombia (14)
- Croatia (2)
- Cyprus (1)
- Czech Republic (4)
- Denmark (5)
- Ecuador (7)
- Egypt (7)
- Estonia (2)
- Finland (3)
- France (2)
- Georgia (10)
- Ghana (3)
- Great Britain (4)
- Greece (3)
- Guatemala (2)
- Hungary (1)
- Iceland (4)
- India (19)
- Indonesia (14)
- Iran (13)
- Ireland (1)
- Jamaica (4)
- Japan (5)
- Kazakhstan (4)
- Kenya (7)
- Kyrgyzstan (3)
- Latvia (3)
- Lithuania (5)
- Malaysia (3)
- Malta (4)
- Mauritius (2)
- Moldova (5)
- Mongolia (2)
- Netherlands (2)
- New Zealand (2)
- Nigeria (7)
- Norway (3)
- Pakistan (4)
- Philippines (10)
- Puerto Rico (1)
- Qatar (1)
- Russian Weightlifting Federation (19)
- Saudi Arabia (4)
- Singapore (1)
- Slovakia (3)
- South Korea (15)
- Spain (9)
- Sri Lanka (19)
- Sweden (3)
- Switzerland (2)
- Thailand (14)
- Tunisia (1)
- Turkey (6)
- Turkmenistan (10)
- Uganda (4)
- Ukraine (8)
- United States (10)
- Uzbekistan (14)
- Venezuela (5)
