= List of Uzbekistani records in Olympic weightlifting =

The following are the records of Uzbekistan in Olympic weightlifting. Records are maintained in each weight class for the snatch lift, clean and jerk lift, and the total for both lifts by the Weightlifting Federation of the Republic of Uzbekistan.

== Current records ==
=== Men ===
Event	Record	Athlete	Date	Meet	Place	Ref
60 kg
Snatch						
Clean & Jerk						
Total						
65 kg
Snatch	134 kg	Adkhamjon Ergashev	9 November 2025	Islamic Solidarity Games	Riyadh, Saudi Arabia	
Clean & Jerk	170 kg	Adkhamjon Ergashev	9 November 2025	Islamic Solidarity Games	Riyadh, Saudi Arabia	
Total	304 kg	Adkhamjon Ergashev	9 November 2025	Islamic Solidarity Games	Riyadh, Saudi Arabia	
70 kg
Snatch	142 kg	Adkhamjon Ergashev	26 September 2026	Asian Games	Nagoya, Japan	
Clean & Jerk	176 kg	Adkhamjon Ergashev	26 September 2026	Asian Games	Nagoya, Japan	
Total	318 kg	Adkhamjon Ergashev	26 September 2026	Asian Games	Nagoya, Japan	
75 kg
Snatch	156 kg	Diyorbek Ruzmetov	26 September 2026	Asian Games	Nagoya, Japan	
Clean & Jerk	180 kg	Diyorbek Ruzmetov	26 September 2026	Asian Games	Nagoya, Japan	
Total	336 kg	Diyorbek Ruzmetov	26 September 2026	Asian Games	Nagoya, Japan	
88 kg
Snatch	161 kg	Sarvarbek Zafarjonov	10 November 2025	Islamic Solidarity Games	Riyadh, Saudi Arabia	
Clean & Jerk	202 kg	Sarvarbek Zafarjonov	10 November 2025	Islamic Solidarity Games	Riyadh, Saudi Arabia	
Total	363 kg	Sarvarbek Zafarjonov	10 November 2025	Islamic Solidarity Games	Riyadh, Saudi Arabia	
95 kg
Snatch	170 kg	Mukhammadkodir Toshtemirov	28 September 2026	Asian Games	Nagoya, Japan	
Clean & Jerk	208 kg	Mukhammadkodir Toshtemirov	28 September 2026	Asian Games	Nagoya, Japan	
Total	378 kg	Mukhammadkodir Toshtemirov	28 September 2026	Asian Games	Nagoya, Japan	
110 kg
Snatch	198 kg	Akbar Djuraev	6 November 2026	World Championships	Ningbo, China	
Clean & Jerk	234 kg	Akbar Djuraev	6 November 2026	World Championships	Ningbo, China	
Total	432 kg	Akbar Djuraev	6 November 2026	World Championships	Ningbo, China	
+110 kg
Snatch	188 kg	Sharofiddin Amriddinov	12 November 2025	Islamic Solidarity Games	Riyadh, Saudi Arabia	
Clean & Jerk	210 kg	Sharofiddin Amriddinov	12 November 2025	Islamic Solidarity Games	Riyadh, Saudi Arabia	
Total	398 kg	Sharofiddin Amriddinov	12 November 2025	Islamic Solidarity Games	Riyadh, Saudi Arabia	

=== Women ===
Event	Record	Athlete	Date	Meet	Place	Ref
48 kg
Snatch						
Clean & Jerk						
Total						
53 kg
Snatch						
Clean & Jerk						
Total						
58 kg
Snatch	96 kg	Nigora Abdullaeva	9 November 2025	Islamic Solidarity Games	Riyadh, Saudi Arabia	
Clean & Jerk	118 kg	Nigora Abdullaeva	9 November 2025	Islamic Solidarity Games	Riyadh, Saudi Arabia	
Total	214 kg	Nigora Abdullaeva	9 November 2025	Islamic Solidarity Games	Riyadh, Saudi Arabia	
63 kg
Snatch						
Clean & Jerk						
Total						
69 kg
Snatch	95 kg	Shakhnoza Khaydarova	10 November 2025	Islamic Solidarity Games	Riyadh, Saudi Arabia	
Clean & Jerk	117 kg	Shakhnoza Khaydarova	10 November 2025	Islamic Solidarity Games	Riyadh, Saudi Arabia	
Total	212 kg	Shakhnoza Khaydarova	10 November 2025	Islamic Solidarity Games	Riyadh, Saudi Arabia	
77 kg
Snatch	96 kg	Gulshodakhon Dadamirzaeva	11 November 2025	Islamic Solidarity Games	Riyadh, Saudi Arabia	
Clean & Jerk	118 kg	Gulshodakhon Dadamirzaeva	11 November 2025	Islamic Solidarity Games	Riyadh, Saudi Arabia	
Total	214 kg	Gulshodakhon Dadamirzaeva	11 November 2025	Islamic Solidarity Games	Riyadh, Saudi Arabia	
86 kg
Snatch	105 kg	Rigina Adashbaeva	11 November 2025	Islamic Solidarity Games	Riyadh, Saudi Arabia	
Clean & Jerk	133 kg	Rigina Adashbaeva	11 November 2025	Islamic Solidarity Games	Riyadh, Saudi Arabia	
Total	238 kg	Rigina Adashbaeva	11 November 2025	Islamic Solidarity Games	Riyadh, Saudi Arabia	
+86 kg
Snatch	116 kg	Tursunoy Jabborova	12 November 2025	Islamic Solidarity Games	Riyadh, Saudi Arabia	
Clean & Jerk	138 kg	Tursunoy Jabborova	12 November 2025	Islamic Solidarity Games	Riyadh, Saudi Arabia	
Total	254 kg	Tursunoy Jabborova	12 November 2025	Islamic Solidarity Games	Riyadh, Saudi Arabia	

== Historical records ==
=== Men (2018–2025) ===
Event	Record	Athlete	Date	Meet	Place	Ref
55 kg
Snatch	111 kg	Ogabek Nafasov	5 May 2023	Asian Championships	Jinju, South Korea	
Clean & Jerk	132 kg	Ogabek Nafasov	18 April 2021	Asian Championships	Tashkent, Uzbekistan	
Total	240 kg	Ogabek Nafasov	18 April 2021	Asian Championships	Tashkent, Uzbekistan	
61 kg
Snatch	136 kg	Adkhamjon Ergashev	3 November 2018	World Championships	Ashgabat, Turkmenistan	
Clean & Jerk	160 kg	Adkhamjon Ergashev	6 September 2023	World Championships	Riyadh, Saudi Arabia	
Total	293 kg	Adkhamjon Ergashev	3 November 2018	World Championships	Ashgabat, Turkmenistan	
67 kg
Snatch	146 kg	Adkhamjon Ergashev	20 September 2019	World Championships	Pattaya, Thailand	
Clean & Jerk	182 kg	Adkhamjon Ergashev	20 September 2019	World Championships	Pattaya, Thailand	
Total	328 kg	Adkhamjon Ergashev	20 September 2019	World Championships	Pattaya, Thailand	
73 kg
Snatch	145 kg	Doston Yokubov	7 December 2023	IWF Grand Prix	Doha, Qatar	
Clean & Jerk	182 kg	Doston Yokubov	22 April 2019	Asian Championships	Ningbo, China	
Total	327 kg	Doston Yokubov	7 December 2023	IWF Grand Prix	Doha, Qatar	
81 kg
Snatch	164 kg	Mukhammadkodir Toshtemirov	13 August 2022	Islamic Solidarity Games	Konya, Turkey	
Clean & Jerk	194 kg	Sarvarbek Zafarjonov	22 December 2019	Qatar Cup	Doha, Qatar	
Total	354 kg	Mukhammadkodir Toshtemirov	13 August 2022	Islamic Solidarity Games	Konya, Turkey	
89 kg
Snatch	167 kg	Sarvarbek Zafarjonov	14 August 2022	Islamic Solidarity Games	Konya, Turkey	
Clean & Jerk	205 kg	Sarvarbek Zafarjonov	13 December 2021	World Championships	Tashkent, Uzbekistan	
Total	371 kg	Sarvarbek Zafarjonov	13 December 2021	World Championships	Tashkent, Uzbekistan	
96 kg
Snatch	165 kg	Sunnatilla Usarov	5 October 2023	Asian Games	Hangzhou, China	
Clean & Jerk	196 kg	Sunnatilla Usarov	11 May 2023	Asian Championships	Jinju, South Korea	
Total	358 kg	Sunnatilla Usarov	11 May 2023	Asian Championships	Jinju, South Korea	
102 kg
Snatch	185 kg	Akbar Djuraev	10 August 2024	Olympic Games	Paris, France	
Clean & Jerk	219 kg	Akbar Djuraev	10 August 2024	Olympic Games	Paris, France	
Total	404 kg	Akbar Djuraev	10 August 2024	Olympic Games	Paris, France	
109 kg
Snatch	195 kg	Akbar Djuraev	16 December 2021	World Championships	Tashkent, Uzbekistan	
Clean & Jerk	242 kg	Ruslan Nurudinov	14 December 2024	World Championships	Manama, Bahrain	
Total	433 kg	Akbar Djuraev	16 December 2021	World Championships	Tashkent, Uzbekistan	
+109 kg
Snatch	200 kg	Akbar Djuraev	15 August 2022	Islamic Solidarity Games	Konya, Turkey	
Clean & Jerk	246 kg	Akbar Djuraev	15 August 2022	Islamic Solidarity Games	Konya, Turkey	
Total	446 kg	Akbar Djuraev	15 August 2022	Islamic Solidarity Games	Konya, Turkey	

=== Women (2018–2025) ===
Event	Record	Athlete	Date	Meet	Place	Ref
45 kg
Snatch	57 kg	Munisa Odilova	3 February 2024	Asian Championships	Tashkent, Uzbekistan	
Clean & Jerk	70 kg	Munisa Odilova	3 February 2024	Asian Championships	Tashkent, Uzbekistan	
Total	127 kg	Munisa Odilova	3 February 2024	Asian Championships	Tashkent, Uzbekistan	
49 kg
Snatch	81 kg	Jamila Panfilova	4 February 2024	Asian Championships	Tashkent, Uzbekistan	
Clean & Jerk	96 kg	Jamila Panfilova	4 December 2023	IWF Grand Prix II	Doha, Qatar	
Total	174 kg	Jamila Panfilova	4 February 2024	Asian Championships	Tashkent, Uzbekistan	
55 kg
Snatch	99 kg	Muattar Nabieva	18 April 2021	Asian Championships	Tashkent, Uzbekistan	
Clean & Jerk	114 kg	Muattar Nabieva	21 December 2019	Qatar Cup	Doha, Qatar	
Total	213 kg	Muattar Nabieva	18 April 2021	Asian Championships	Tashkent, Uzbekistan	
59 kg
Snatch	80 kg	Nigora Abdullaeva	19 April 2021	Asian Championships	Tashkent, Uzbekistan	
Clean & Jerk	100 kg	Nigora Abdullaeva	19 April 2021	Asian Championships	Tashkent, Uzbekistan	
Total	180 kg	Nigora Abdullaeva	19 April 2021	Asian Championships	Tashkent, Uzbekistan	
64 kg
Snatch	97 kg	Kumushkhon Fayzullaeva	22 September 2019	World Championships	Pattaya, Thailand	
Clean & Jerk	124 kg	Kumushkhon Fayzullaeva	22 September 2019	World Championships	Pattaya, Thailand	
Total	221 kg	Kumushkhon Fayzullaeva	22 September 2019	World Championships	Pattaya, Thailand	
71 kg
Snatch	102 kg	Kumushkhon Fayzullaeva	13 December 2021	World Championships	Tashkent, Uzbekistan	
Clean & Jerk	126 kg	Kumushkhon Fayzullaeva	13 December 2021	World Championships	Tashkent, Uzbekistan	
Total	228 kg	Kumushkhon Fayzullaeva	13 December 2021	World Championships	Tashkent, Uzbekistan	
76 kg
Snatch	104 kg	Tursunoy Jabborova	22 December 2019	Qatar Cup	Doha, Qatar	
Clean & Jerk	126 kg	Kumushkhon Fayzullaeva	1 August 2021	Olympic Games	Tokyo, Japan	
Total	227 kg	Tursunoy Jabborova	1 August 2021	Olympic Games	Tokyo, Japan	
81 kg
Snatch	107 kg	Rigina Adashbaeva	9 April 2024	World Cup	Phuket, Thailand	
Clean & Jerk	132 kg	Rigina Adashbaeva	9 April 2024	World Cup	Phuket, Thailand	
Total	239 kg	Rigina Adashbaeva	9 April 2024	World Cup	Phuket, Thailand	
87 kg
Snatch	113 kg	Tursunoy Jabborova	16 December 2021	World Championships	Tashkent, Uzbekistan	
Clean & Jerk	132 kg	Tursunoy Jabborova	24 April 2021	Asian Championships	Tashkent, Uzbekistan	
Total	244 kg	Tursunoy Jabborova	16 December 2021	World Championships	Tashkent, Uzbekistan	
+87 kg
Snatch	119 kg	Tursunoy Jabborova	10 April 2024	World Cup	Phuket, Thailand	
Clean & Jerk	142 kg	Tursunoy Jabborova	7 October 2023	Asian Games	Hangzhou, China	
Total	260 kg	Tursunoy Jabborova	7 October 2023	Asian Games	Hangzhou, China	

=== Men (1998–2018) ===
Event	Record	Athlete	Date	Meet	Place	Ref
56 kg
Snatch						
Clean & Jerk						
Total						
62 kg
Snatch						
Clean & Jerk						
Total						,
69 kg
Snatch	139 kg	Doston Yokubov	20 September 2017	Asian Indoor and Martial Arts Games	Ashgabat, Turkmenistan	
Clean & Jerk	179 kg	Doston Yokubov	1 December 2017	World Championships	Anaheim, United States	
Total	316 kg	Doston Yokubov	20 September 2017	Asian Indoor and Martial Arts Games	Ashgabat, Turkmenistan	
77 kg
Snatch	155 kg	Shakhzod Khudayberganov	21 September 2017	Asian Indoor and Martial Arts Games	Ashgabat, Turkmenistan	
Clean & Jerk	187 kg	Shakhzod Khudayberganov	21 September 2017	Asian Indoor and Martial Arts Games	Ashgabat, Turkmenistan	
Total	342 kg	Shakhzod Khudayberganov	21 September 2017	Asian Indoor and Martial Arts Games	Ashgabat, Turkmenistan	
85 kg
Snatch	168 kg	Ulugbek Alimov	13 November 2014	World Championships	Almaty, Kazakhstan	
Clean & Jerk	213 kg	Ulugbek Alimov	13 November 2014	World Championships	Almaty, Kazakhstan	
Total	381 kg	Ulugbek Alimov	13 November 2014	World Championships	Almaty, Kazakhstan	
94 kg
Snatch	183 kg	Farkhodbek Sobirov	3 December 2017	World Championships	Anaheim, United States	
Clean & Jerk	210 kg	Farkhodbek Sobirov	23 September 2017	Asian Indoor and Martial Arts Games	Ashgabat, Turkmenistan	
Total	391 kg	Farkhodbek Sobirov	23 September 2017	Asian Indoor and Martial Arts Games	Ashgabat, Turkmenistan	
105 kg
Snatch	194 kg	Ivan Efremov	15 August 2016	Olympic Games	Rio de Janeiro, Brazil	
Clean & Jerk	239 kg	Ruslan Nurudinov	15 November 2014	World Championships	Almaty, Kazakhstan	
Total	432 kg	Ruslan Nurudinov	15 November 2014	World Championships	Almaty, Kazakhstan	
+105 kg
Snatch	200 kg	Rustam Djangabaev	5 December 2017	World Championships	Anaheim, United States	
Clean & Jerk	247 kg	Rustam Djangabaev	5 December 2017	World Championships	Anaheim, United States	
Total	447 kg	Rustam Djangabaev	5 December 2017	World Championships	Anaheim, United States	

=== Women (1998–2018) ===
Event	Record	Athlete	Date	Meet	Place	Ref
48 kg
Snatch						
Clean & Jerk						
Total						
53 kg
Snatch						
Clean & Jerk						
Total						
58 kg
Snatch	97 kg	Muattar Nabieva	30 November 2017	World Championships	Anaheim, United States	
Clean & Jerk	118 kg	Muattar Nabieva	20 September 2017	Asian Indoor and Martial Arts Games	Ashgabat, Turkmenistan	
Total	212 kg	Muattar Nabieva	20 September 2017	Asian Indoor and Martial Arts Games	Ashgabat, Turkmenistan	
63 kg
Snatch						
Clean & Jerk						
Total						
69 kg
Snatch						
Clean & Jerk						
Total						
75 kg
Snatch	101 kg	Omadoy Otakuziyeva	23 September 2017	Asian Indoor and Martial Arts Games	Ashgabat, Turkmenistan	
Clean & Jerk	130 kg	Omadoy Otakuziyeva	23 September 2017	Asian Indoor and Martial Arts Games	Ashgabat, Turkmenistan	
Total	231 kg	Omadoy Otakuziyeva	23 September 2017	Asian Indoor and Martial Arts Games	Ashgabat, Turkmenistan	
90 kg
Snatch	93 kg	Dolera Davronova	24 September 2017	Asian Indoor and Martial Arts Games	Ashgabat, Turkmenistan	
Clean & Jerk	117 kg	Dolera Davronova	24 September 2017	Asian Indoor and Martial Arts Games	Ashgabat, Turkmenistan	
Total	210 kg	Dolera Davronova	24 September 2017	Asian Indoor and Martial Arts Games	Ashgabat, Turkmenistan	
+90 kg
Snatch						
Clean & Jerk						
Total						
