= 2019 Asian Weightlifting Championships =

International weightlifting competition

2019 Asian Championships
- Host city: Ningbo, China
- Dates: 20–28 April

The 2019 Asian Weightlifting Championships were held in Ningbo, China from 20 to 28 April 2019. It was the 48th men's and 29th women's championship.

== Medal summary ==
=== Men ===
Event	Gold		Silver		Bronze	
55 kg
Snatch	Mansour Al-Saleem; Saudi Arabia	122 kg	Arli Chontey; Kazakhstan	113 kg	Azroy Hazalwafie; Malaysia	112 kg
Clean & Jerk	Mansour Al-Saleem; Saudi Arabia	140 kg	Azroy Hazalwafie; Malaysia	136 kg	Dilanka Isuru Kumara; Sri Lanka	135 kg
Total	Mansour Al-Saleem; Saudi Arabia	262 kg	Azroy Hazalwafie; Malaysia	248 kg	Arli Chontey; Kazakhstan	246 kg
61 kg
Snatch	Li Fabin; China	141 kg	Qin Fulin; China	136 kg	Thạch Kim Tuấn; Vietnam	136 kg
Clean & Jerk	Li Fabin; China	171 kg	Qin Fulin; China	166 kg	Eko Yuli Irawan; Indonesia	166 kg
Total	Li Fabin; China	312 kg	Qin Fulin; China	302 kg	Eko Yuli Irawan; Indonesia	299 kg
67 kg
Snatch	Chen Lijun; China	154 kg WR	Feng Lüdong; China	152 kg	Pak Jong-ju; North Korea	143 kg
Clean & Jerk	Chen Lijun; China	185 kg WR	Pak Jong-ju; North Korea	179 kg	Feng Lüdong; China	178 kg
Total	Chen Lijun; China	339 kg WR	Feng Lüdong; China	330 kg	Pak Jong-ju; North Korea	322 kg
73 kg
Snatch	Shi Zhiyong; China	168 kg WR	Yuan Chengfei; China	156 kg	O Kang-chol; North Korea	150 kg
Clean & Jerk	Shi Zhiyong; China	194 kg	Yuan Chengfei; China	193 kg	O Kang-chol; North Korea	188 kg
Total	Shi Zhiyong; China	362 kg WR	Yuan Chengfei; China	349 kg	O Kang-chol; North Korea	338 kg
81 kg
Snatch	Li Dayin; China	168 kg	Choe Jon-wi; North Korea	162 kg	Denis Ulanov; Kazakhstan	160 kg
Clean & Jerk	Choe Jon-wi; North Korea	197 kg	Ri Chong-song; North Korea	197 kg	Denis Ulanov; Kazakhstan	196 kg
Total	Li Dayin; China	363 kg	Choe Jon-wi; North Korea	359 kg	Denis Ulanov; Kazakhstan	356 kg
89 kg
Snatch	Jang Yeon-hak; South Korea	166 kg	Masoud Chatraei; Iran	165 kg	Ali Miri; Iran	161 kg
Clean & Jerk	Yu Dong-ju; South Korea	207 kg	Ali Miri; Iran	205 kg	Toshiki Yamamoto; Japan	203 kg
Total	Yu Dong-ju; South Korea	367 kg	Ali Miri; Iran	366 kg	Toshiki Yamamoto; Japan	358 kg
96 kg
Snatch	Tian Tao; China	181 kg	Fares El-Bakh; Qatar	174 kg	Ayoub Mousavi; Iran	166 kg
Clean & Jerk	Tian Tao; China	220 kg	Ayoub Mousavi; Iran	207 kg	Han Jung-hoon; South Korea	206 kg
Total	Tian Tao; China	401 kg	Ayoub Mousavi; Iran	373 kg	Han Jung-hoon; South Korea	366 kg
102 kg
Snatch	Reza Beiranvand; Iran	173 kg	Sunnatilla Usarov; Uzbekistan	172 kg	Bekdoolot Rasulbekov; Kyrgyzstan	171 kg
Clean & Jerk	Reza Beiranvand; Iran	216 kg	Amir Hoghoughi; Iran	215 kg	Pardeep Singh; India	201 kg
Total	Reza Beiranvand; Iran	389 kg	Amir Hoghoughi; Iran	384 kg	Taro Tanaka; Japan	364 kg
109 kg
Snatch	Yang Zhe; China	192 kg	Akbar Djuraev; Uzbekistan	185 kg	Jeong Ki-sam; South Korea	181 kg
Clean & Jerk	Ali Hashemi; Iran	225 kg	Akbar Djuraev; Uzbekistan	225 kg	Yang Zhe; China	225 kg
Total	Yang Zhe; China	417 kg	Akbar Djuraev; Uzbekistan	410 kg	Ali Hashemi; Iran	405 kg
+109 kg
Snatch	Ali Davoudi; Iran	195 kg	Ham Sang-il; South Korea	188 kg	Man Asaad; Syria	188 kg
Clean & Jerk	Ali Davoudi; Iran	237 kg	Chen Shih-chieh; Chinese Taipei	235 kg	Hojamuhammet Toýçyýew; Turkmenistan	234 kg
Total	Ali Davoudi; Iran	432 kg	Chen Shih-chieh; Chinese Taipei	422 kg	Hojamuhammet Toýçyýew; Turkmenistan	421 kg

=== Women ===
Event	Gold		Silver		Bronze	
45 kg
Snatch	Vương Thị Huyền; Vietnam	76 kg	Jhilli Dalabehera; India	71 kg	Khổng Mỹ Phượng; Vietnam	70 kg
Clean & Jerk	Vương Thị Huyền; Vietnam	92 kg	Jhilli Dalabehera; India	91 kg	Mary Flor Diaz; Philippines	89 kg
Total	Vương Thị Huyền; Vietnam	168 kg	Jhilli Dalabehera; India	162 kg	Mary Flor Diaz; Philippines	158 kg
49 kg
Snatch	Hou Zhihui; China	92 kg	Zhang Rong; China	88 kg	Ri Song-gum; North Korea	86 kg
Clean & Jerk	Hou Zhihui; China	116 kg	Ri Song-gum; North Korea	114 kg	Mirabai Chanu; India	113 kg
Total	Hou Zhihui; China	208 kg	Ri Song-gum; North Korea	200 kg	Zhang Rong; China	199 kg
55 kg
Snatch	Liao Qiuyun; China	96 kg	Hidilyn Diaz; Philippines	94 kg	Muattar Nabieva; Uzbekistan	91 kg
Clean & Jerk	Liao Qiuyun; China	128 kg WR	Hidilyn Diaz; Philippines	115 kg	Muattar Nabieva; Uzbekistan	113 kg
Total	Liao Qiuyun; China	224 kg	Hidilyn Diaz; Philippines	209 kg	Muattar Nabieva; Uzbekistan	204 kg
59 kg
Snatch	Kuo Hsing-chun; Chinese Taipei	106 kg WR	Chen Guiming; China	102 kg	Hoàng Thị Duyên; Vietnam	101 kg
Clean & Jerk	Kuo Hsing-chun; Chinese Taipei	137 kg WR	Chen Guiming; China	131 kg	Mikiko Ando; Japan	128 kg
Total	Kuo Hsing-chun; Chinese Taipei	243 kg WR	Chen Guiming; China	233 kg	Mikiko Ando; Japan	225 kg
64 kg
Snatch	Deng Wei; China	115 kg WR	Kim Hyo-sim; North Korea	114 kg	Choe Hyo-sim; North Korea	104 kg
Clean & Jerk	Deng Wei; China	142 kg WR	Kim Hyo-sim; North Korea	135 kg	Choe Hyo-sim; North Korea	134 kg
Total	Deng Wei; China	257 kg WR	Kim Hyo-sim; North Korea	249 kg	Choe Hyo-sim; North Korea	238 kg
71 kg
Snatch	Rim Un-sim; North Korea	111 kg	Eri Mitsuke; Japan	97 kg	Nguyễn Thị Vân; Vietnam	95 kg
Clean & Jerk	Rim Un-sim; North Korea	130 kg	Nguyễn Thị Vân; Vietnam	121 kg	Eri Mitsuke; Japan	118 kg
Total	Rim Un-sim; North Korea	241 kg	Nguyễn Thị Vân; Vietnam	216 kg	Eri Mitsuke; Japan	215 kg
76 kg
Snatch	Rim Jong-sim; North Korea	123 kg WR	Zhang Wangli; China	118 kg	Kim Su-hyeon; South Korea	107 kg
Clean & Jerk	Rim Jong-sim; North Korea	155 kg	Zhang Wangli; China	146 kg	Kim Su-hyeon; South Korea	137 kg
Total	Rim Jong-sim; North Korea	278 kg WR	Zhang Wangli; China	264 kg	Kim Su-hyeon; South Korea	244 kg
81 kg
Snatch	Raushan Meshitkhanova; Kazakhstan	98 kg	Kang Yeoun-hee; South Korea	97 kg	Mönkhjantsangiin Ankhtsetseg; Mongolia	93 kg
Clean & Jerk	Kang Yeoun-hee; South Korea	123 kg	Aýsoltan Toýçyýewa; Turkmenistan	114 kg	Mönkhjantsangiin Ankhtsetseg; Mongolia	113 kg
Total	Kang Yeoun-hee; South Korea	220 kg	Mönkhjantsangiin Ankhtsetseg; Mongolia	206 kg	Raushan Meshitkhanova; Kazakhstan	205 kg
87 kg
Snatch	Wang Zhouyu; China	125 kg	Larisa Kobeleva; Kazakhstan	115 kg	Kim Un-ju; North Korea	114 kg
Clean & Jerk	Wang Zhouyu; China	155 kg	Ao Hui; China	152 kg	Kim Un-ju; North Korea	152 kg
Total	Wang Zhouyu; China	280 kg	Kim Un-ju; North Korea	266 kg	Ao Hui; China	262 kg
+87 kg
Snatch	Li Wenwen; China	147 kg WR	Meng Suping; China	130 kg	Lee Seon-mi; South Korea	127 kg
Clean & Jerk	Li Wenwen; China	175 kg	Meng Suping; China	175 kg	Kim Kuk-hyang; North Korea	167 kg
Total	Li Wenwen; China	322 kg	Meng Suping; China	305 kg	Kim Kuk-hyang; North Korea	293 kg

== Medal table ==
Ranking by Big (Total result) medals

Rank	Nation	Gold	Silver	Bronze	Total
1	China	11	6	2	19
2	North Korea	2	4	4	10
3	Iran	2	3	1	6
4	South Korea	2	0	2	4
5	Chinese Taipei	1	1	0	2
5	Vietnam	1	1	0	2
7	Saudi Arabia	1	0	0	1
8	Philippines	0	1	1	2
8	Uzbekistan	0	1	1	2
10	India	0	1	0	1
10	Malaysia	0	1	0	1
10	Mongolia	0	1	0	1
13	Japan	0	0	4	4
14	Kazakhstan	0	0	3	3
15	Indonesia	0	0	1	1
15	Turkmenistan	0	0	1	1
Totals (16 entries)		20	20	20	60

Ranking by all medals: Big (Total result) and Small (Snatch and Clean & Jerk)

Rank	Nation	Gold	Silver	Bronze	Total
1	China	31	19	4	54
2	North Korea	7	10	13	30
3	Iran	7	7	3	17
4	South Korea	5	2	7	14
5	Vietnam	3	2	4	9
6	Chinese Taipei	3	2	0	5
7	Saudi Arabia	3	0	0	3
8	Kazakhstan	1	2	5	8
9	Uzbekistan	0	4	3	7
10	India	0	3	2	5
10	Philippines	0	3	2	5
12	Malaysia	0	2	1	3
13	Japan	0	1	7	8
14	Mongolia	0	1	2	3
14	Turkmenistan	0	1	2	3
16	Qatar	0	1	0	1
17	Indonesia	0	0	2	2
18	Kyrgyzstan	0	0	1	1
18	Sri Lanka	0	0	1	1
18	Syria	0	0	1	1
Totals (20 entries)		60	60	60	180

== Team ranking ==
=== Men ===
Rank	Team	Points
1	China	716
2	Iran	705
3	South Korea	633
4	Kazakhstan	472
5	Japan	467
6	Turkmenistan	421

=== Women ===
Rank	Team	Points
1	China	785
2	South Korea	615
3	North Korea	524
4	Japan	524
5	Kazakhstan	451
6	Chinese Taipei	441

== Participating nations ==
214 athletes from 27 nations competed.

- China (20)
- Chinese Taipei (13)
- India (11)
- Indonesia (8)
- Iran (17)
- Japan (20)
- Jordan (2)
- Kazakhstan (17)
- Kyrgyzstan (2)
- Laos (2)
- Lebanon (1)
- Malaysia (2)
- Mongolia (5)
- Nepal (1)
- North Korea (12)
- Pakistan (2)
- Philippines (8)
- Qatar (1)
- Saudi Arabia (5)
- Singapore (1)
- South Korea (20)
- Sri Lanka (5)
- Syria (2)
- Turkmenistan (16)
- United Arab Emirates (4)
- Uzbekistan (6)
- Vietnam (11)
