= 2020 Asian Weightlifting Championships =

2021 weightlifting event in Uzbekistan

2020 Asian Championships
- Host city: Tashkent, Uzbekistan
- Dates: 16–25 April 2021
- Main venue: Uzbekistan Sports Complex

The 2020 Asian Weightlifting Championships were held in Tashkent, Uzbekistan, from 16 to 25 April 2021. Originally the event was scheduled to take place from 18 to 25 April 2020 but was postponed to 16 to 25 April 2021 because of the COVID-19 pandemic. It was the 49th men's and 30th women's championship.

== Medal summary ==
=== Men ===
Event	Gold		Silver		Bronze	
55 kg
Snatch	Arli Chontey; Kazakhstan	115 kg	Ogabek Nafasov; Uzbekistan	108 kg	Ablay Auyelkhanov; Kazakhstan	108 kg
Clean & Jerk	Arli Chontey; Kazakhstan	140 kg	Dilanka Isuru Kumara; Sri Lanka	137 kg	Ablay Auyelkhanov; Kazakhstan	136 kg
Total	Arli Chontey; Kazakhstan	255 kg	Ablay Auyelkhanov; Kazakhstan	244 kg	Dilanka Isuru Kumara; Sri Lanka	241 kg
61 kg
Snatch	Li Fabin; China	142 kg	Seýitjan Mirzaýew; Turkmenistan	133 kg	Igor Son; Kazakhstan	132 kg
Clean & Jerk	Li Fabin; China	170 kg	Seraj Al-Saleem; Saudi Arabia	161 kg	Yoichi Itokazu; Japan	155 kg
Total	Li Fabin; China	312 kg	Seraj Al-Saleem; Saudi Arabia	286 kg	Yoichi Itokazu; Japan	285 kg
67 kg
Snatch	Huang Minhao; China	155 kg	Chen Lijun; China	153 kg	Talha Talib; Pakistan	148 kg
Clean & Jerk	Chen Lijun; China	180 kg	Huang Minhao; China	177 kg	Adkhamjon Ergashev; Uzbekistan	176 kg
Total	Chen Lijun; China	333 kg	Huang Minhao; China	332 kg	Adkhamjon Ergashev; Uzbekistan	316 kg
73 kg
Snatch	Shi Zhiyong; China	169 kg WR	Yuan Chengfei; China	155 kg	Mirmostafa Javadi; Iran	151 kg
Clean & Jerk	Shi Zhiyong; China	194 kg	Maksat Meredow; Turkmenistan	189 kg	Rahmat Erwin Abdullah; Indonesia	187 kg
Total	Shi Zhiyong; China	363 kg	Maksat Meredow; Turkmenistan	336 kg	Masanori Miyamoto; Japan	335 kg
81 kg
Snatch	Li Dayin; China	175 kg WR	Lü Xiaojun; China	174 kg	Mukhammadkodir Toshtemirov; Uzbekistan	160 kg
Clean & Jerk	Lü Xiaojun; China	199 kg	Mukhammadkodir Toshtemirov; Uzbekistan	193 kg	Takehiro Kasai; Japan	186 kg
Total	Lü Xiaojun; China	373 kg	Mukhammadkodir Toshtemirov; Uzbekistan	353 kg	Rejepbaý Rejepow; Turkmenistan	341 kg
89 kg
Snatch	Nurgissa Adiletuly; Kazakhstan	169 kg	Kianoush Rostami; Iran	167 kg	Sarvarbek Zafarjonov; Uzbekistan	166 kg
Clean & Jerk	Yu Dong-ju; South Korea	207 kg	Kianoush Rostami; Iran	206 kg	Nurgissa Adiletuly; Kazakhstan	203 kg
Total	Kianoush Rostami; Iran	373 kg	Nurgissa Adiletuly; Kazakhstan	372 kg	Sarvarbek Zafarjonov; Uzbekistan	368 kg
96 kg
Snatch	Tian Tao; China	175 kg	Jang Yeon-hak; South Korea	174 kg	Sohrab Moradi; Iran	174 kg
Clean & Jerk	Tian Tao; China	211 kg	Sohrab Moradi; Iran	210 kg	Toshiki Yamamoto; Japan	205 kg
Total	Tian Tao; China	386 kg	Sohrab Moradi; Iran	384 kg	Jang Yeon-hak; South Korea	379 kg
102 kg
Snatch	Reza Dehdar; Iran	175 kg	Fares El-Bakh; Qatar	174 kg	Rasoul Motamedi; Iran	173 kg
Clean & Jerk	Rasoul Motamedi; Iran	227 kg	Fares El-Bakh; Qatar	222 kg	Artyom Antropov; Kazakhstan	222 kg
Total	Rasoul Motamedi; Iran	400 kg	Fares El-Bakh; Qatar	396 kg	Artyom Antropov; Kazakhstan	390 kg
109 kg
Snatch	Yang Zhe; China	200 kg WR	Akbar Djuraev; Uzbekistan	194 kg	Ruslan Nurudinov; Uzbekistan	188 kg
Clean & Jerk	Ruslan Nurudinov; Uzbekistan	241 kg WR	Akbar Djuraev; Uzbekistan	234 kg	Kia Ghadami; Iran	223 kg
Total	Ruslan Nurudinov; Uzbekistan	429 kg AR	Akbar Djuraev; Uzbekistan	428 kg	Yang Zhe; China	415 kg
+109 kg
Snatch	Ali Davoudi; Iran	196 kg	Man Asaad; Syria	195 kg	Eishiro Murakami; Japan	190 kg
Clean & Jerk	Ali Davoudi; Iran	239 kg	Man Asaad; Syria	238 kg	Eishiro Murakami; Japan	225 kg
Total	Ali Davoudi; Iran	435 kg	Man Asaad; Syria	433 kg	Eishiro Murakami; Japan	415 kg

=== Women ===
Event	Gold		Silver		Bronze	
45 kg
Snatch	Jhilli Dalabehera; India	69 kg	Mary Flor Diaz; Philippines	60 kg	None awarded	
Clean & Jerk	Jhilli Dalabehera; India	88 kg	Mary Flor Diaz; Philippines	75 kg	None awarded	
Total	Jhilli Dalabehera; India	157 kg	Mary Flor Diaz; Philippines	135 kg	None awarded	
49 kg
Snatch	Hou Zhihui; China	96 kg WR	Jiang Huihua; China	89 kg	Windy Cantika Aisah; Indonesia	87 kg
Clean & Jerk	Mirabai Chanu; India	119 kg WR	Jiang Huihua; China	118 kg	Hou Zhihui; China	117 kg
Total	Hou Zhihui; China	213 kg WR	Jiang Huihua; China	207 kg	Mirabai Chanu; India	205 kg
55 kg
Snatch	Li Yajun; China	101 kg	Muattar Nabieva; Uzbekistan	99 kg	Liao Qiuyun; China	98 kg
Clean & Jerk	Liao Qiuyun; China	124 kg	Li Yajun; China	120 kg	Zulfiya Chinshanlo; Kazakhstan	118 kg
Total	Liao Qiuyun; China	222 kg	Li Yajun; China	221 kg	Muattar Nabieva; Uzbekistan	213 kg
59 kg
Snatch	Kuo Hsing-chun; Chinese Taipei	110 kg WR	Luo Xiaomin; China	102 kg	Hoàng Thị Duyên; Vietnam	100 kg
Clean & Jerk	Kuo Hsing-chun; Chinese Taipei	137 kg	Luo Xiaomin; China	125 kg	Mikiko Ando; Japan	124 kg
Total	Kuo Hsing-chun; Chinese Taipei	247 kg WR	Luo Xiaomin; China	227 kg	Hoàng Thị Duyên; Vietnam	216 kg
64 kg
Snatch	Chen Wen-huei; Chinese Taipei	100 kg	Han So-jin; South Korea	96 kg	Elreen Ando; Philippines	94 kg
Clean & Jerk	Chen Wen-huei; Chinese Taipei	128 kg	Elreen Ando; Philippines	119 kg	Han So-jin; South Korea	115 kg
Total	Chen Wen-huei; Chinese Taipei	228 kg	Elreen Ando; Philippines	213 kg	Han So-jin; South Korea	211 kg
71 kg
Snatch	Gülnabat Kadyrowa; Turkmenistan	102 kg	Vanessa Sarno; Philippines	101 kg	Yekaterina Bykova; Kazakhstan	91 kg
Clean & Jerk	Vanessa Sarno; Philippines	128 kg	Yekaterina Bykova; Kazakhstan	122 kg	Gülnabat Kadyrowa; Turkmenistan	121 kg
Total	Vanessa Sarno; Philippines	229 kg	Gülnabat Kadyrowa; Turkmenistan	223 kg	Yekaterina Bykova; Kazakhstan	213 kg
76 kg
Snatch	Zhang Wangli; China	115 kg	Kim Su-hyeon; South Korea	106 kg	Kang Yeoun-hee; South Korea	100 kg
Clean & Jerk	Zhang Wangli; China	148 kg	Kim Su-hyeon; South Korea	138 kg	Kristel Macrohon; Philippines	126 kg
Total	Zhang Wangli; China	263 kg	Kim Su-hyeon; South Korea	244 kg	Kristel Macrohon; Philippines	225 kg
81 kg
Snatch	Karina Kuzganbayeva; Kazakhstan	104 kg	Jang Hyeon-ju; South Korea	103 kg	Aýsoltan Toýçyýewa; Turkmenistan	96 kg
Clean & Jerk	Jang Hyeon-ju; South Korea	133 kg	Karina Kuzganbayeva; Kazakhstan	128 kg	Nigora Suvonova; Uzbekistan	123 kg
Total	Jang Hyeon-ju; South Korea	236 kg	Karina Kuzganbayeva; Kazakhstan	232 kg	Aýsoltan Toýçyýewa; Turkmenistan	218 kg
87 kg
Snatch	Wang Zhouyu; China	126 kg	Kang Yue; China	118 kg	Mönkhjantsangiin Ankhtsetseg; Mongolia	111 kg
Clean & Jerk	Wang Zhouyu; China	160 kg	Kang Yue; China	155 kg	Mönkhjantsangiin Ankhtsetseg; Mongolia	136 kg
Total	Wang Zhouyu; China	286 kg	Kang Yue; China	273 kg	Mönkhjantsangiin Ankhtsetseg; Mongolia	247 kg
+87 kg
Snatch	Li Wenwen; China	148 kg WR	Son Young-hee; South Korea	120 kg	Aizada Muptilda; Kazakhstan	118 kg
Clean & Jerk	Li Wenwen; China	187 kg WR	Son Young-hee; South Korea	159 kg	Aizada Muptilda; Kazakhstan	151 kg
Total	Li Wenwen; China	335 kg WR	Son Young-hee; South Korea	279 kg	Aizada Muptilda; Kazakhstan	269 kg

== Medal table ==
Ranking by Big (Total result) medals

Rank	Nation	Gold	Silver	Bronze	Total
1	China	10	5	1	16
2	Iran	3	1	0	4
3	Chinese Taipei	2	0	0	2
4	Kazakhstan	1	3	3	7
5	Uzbekistan	1	2	3	6
6	South Korea	1	2	2	5
7	Philippines	1	2	1	4
8	India	1	0	1	2
9	Turkmenistan	0	2	2	4
10	Qatar	0	1	0	1
10	Saudi Arabia	0	1	0	1
10	Syria	0	1	0	1
13	Japan	0	0	3	3
14	Mongolia	0	0	1	1
14	Sri Lanka	0	0	1	1
14	Vietnam	0	0	1	1
Totals (16 entries)		20	20	19	59

Ranking by all medals: Big (Total result) and Small (Snatch and Clean & Jerk)

Rank	Nation	Gold	Silver	Bronze	Total
1	China	30	16	3	49
2	Iran	7	4	4	15
3	Chinese Taipei	6	0	0	6
4	Kazakhstan	5	5	12	22
5	India	4	0	1	5
6	South Korea	3	9	4	16
7	Uzbekistan	2	7	8	17
8	Philippines	2	6	3	11
9	Turkmenistan	1	4	4	9
10	Qatar	0	3	0	3
10	Syria	0	3	0	3
12	Saudi Arabia	0	2	0	2
13	Sri Lanka	0	1	1	2
14	Japan	0	0	9	9
15	Mongolia	0	0	3	3
16	Indonesia	0	0	2	2
16	Vietnam	0	0	2	2
18	Pakistan	0	0	1	1
Totals (18 entries)		60	60	57	177

== Team ranking ==
=== Men ===
Rank	Team	Points
1	Kazakhstan	658
2	Uzbekistan	645
3	China	638
4	Iran	600
5	Japan	480
6	Turkmenistan	385

=== Women ===
Rank	Team	Points
1	China	713
2	South Korea	557
3	Uzbekistan	508
4	Kazakhstan	474
5	Philippines	469
6	Japan	468

== Participating nations ==
176 athletes from 26 nations competed.

- Afghanistan (5)
- Bangladesh (2)
- China (20)
- Chinese Taipei (5)
- India (6)
- Indonesia (7)
- Iran (14)
- Japan (19)
- Kazakhstan (17)
- Kyrgyzstan (2)
- Lebanon (1)
- Mongolia (3)
- Nepal (2)
- Oman (1)
- Pakistan (1)
- Palestine (1)
- Philippines (9)
- Qatar (1)
- Saudi Arabia (6)
- Singapore (1)
- South Korea (15)
- Sri Lanka (4)
- Syria (2)
- Turkmenistan (11)
- Uzbekistan (18)
- Vietnam (3)

== Men's results ==
=== 55 kg ===
Rank	Athlete	Group	Snatch (kg)				Clean & Jerk (kg)				Total
Rank	Athlete	Group	1	2	3	Rank	1	2	3	Rank	Total
1st place, gold medalist(s)	Arli Chontey (KAZ)	A	110	113	115	1st place, gold medalist(s)	136	140	~~142~~	1st place, gold medalist(s)	255
2nd place, silver medalist(s)	Ablay Auyelkhanov (KAZ)	A	103	106	108	3rd place, bronze medalist(s)	136	~~141~~	~~148~~	3rd place, bronze medalist(s)	244
3rd place, bronze medalist(s)	Dilanka Isuru Kumara (SRI)	A	104	~~109~~	~~109~~	4	135	~~137~~	137	2nd place, silver medalist(s)	241
4	Ogabek Nafasov (UZB)	A	104	108	~~111~~	2nd place, silver medalist(s)	124	132	~~135~~	4	240

=== 61 kg ===
Rank	Athlete	Group	Snatch (kg)				Clean & Jerk (kg)				Total
Rank	Athlete	Group	1	2	3	Rank	1	2	3	Rank	Total
1st place, gold medalist(s)	Li Fabin (CHN)	A	138	~~142~~	142	1st place, gold medalist(s)	170	~~176~~	~~176~~	1st place, gold medalist(s)	312
2nd place, silver medalist(s)	Seraj Al-Saleem (KSA)	A	125	~~128~~	~~129~~	7	155	160	161	2nd place, silver medalist(s)	286
3rd place, bronze medalist(s)	Yoichi Itokazu (JPN)	A	125	~~130~~	130	4	150	155	~~160~~	3rd place, bronze medalist(s)	285
4	Igor Son (KAZ)	A	~~127~~	127	132	3rd place, bronze medalist(s)	152	~~156~~	~~156~~	5	284
5	Seýitjan Mirzaýew (TKM)	A	~~130~~	130	133	2nd place, silver medalist(s)	150	~~153~~	~~153~~	6	283
6	Alexey Drozdov (KAZ)	B	120	124	~~126~~	8	145	150	154	4	278
7	Mansour Al-Saleem (KSA)	B	115	~~120~~	120	9	~~143~~	~~143~~	143	9	263
8	John Ceniza (PHI)	B	105	110	~~115~~	11	135	~~143~~	~~143~~	10	245
9	Khusinboy Matrasulov (UZB)	B	103	107	111	10	124	127	131	11	242
—	Kao Chan-hung (TPE)	A	125	~~129~~	129	5	~~154~~	~~154~~	~~154~~	—	—
—	Thạch Kim Tuấn (VIE)	A	125	128	~~131~~	6	~~151~~	~~152~~	~~152~~	—	—
—	Thilanka Palangasinghe (SRI)	B	~~115~~	~~115~~	~~115~~	—	145	~~148~~	~~148~~	7	—
—	Hayato Hirai (JPN)	B	~~118~~	~~118~~	~~118~~	—	145	~~150~~	~~150~~	8	—

=== 67 kg ===
Rank	Athlete	Group	Snatch (kg)				Clean & Jerk (kg)				Total
Rank	Athlete	Group	1	2	3	Rank	1	2	3	Rank	Total
1st place, gold medalist(s)	Chen Lijun (CHN)	A	145	150	153	2nd place, silver medalist(s)	171	177	180	1st place, gold medalist(s)	333
2nd place, silver medalist(s)	Huang Minhao (CHN)	A	147	152	155	1st place, gold medalist(s)	168	174	177	2nd place, silver medalist(s)	332
3rd place, bronze medalist(s)	Adkhamjon Ergashev (UZB)	A	~~140~~	~~140~~	140	5	170	176	~~181~~	3rd place, bronze medalist(s)	316
4	Talha Talib (PAK)	A	142	146	148	3rd place, bronze medalist(s)	167	~~172~~	~~172~~	6	315
5	Han Myeong-mok (KOR)	A	139	143	~~147~~	4	160	165	169	4	312
6	Mitsunori Konnai (JPN)	A	~~138~~	~~138~~	138	7	166	~~169~~	~~169~~	7	304
7	Nawaf Al-Mazyadi (KSA)	B	130	135	~~141~~	8	160	167	~~171~~	5	302
8	Jeremy Lalrinnunga (IND)	A	135	~~139~~	139	6	163	~~168~~	~~168~~	8	302
9	Triyatno (INA)	A	125	~~130~~	130	9	160	~~165~~	~~165~~	9	290
—	Shafiq Jan Sakhizada (AFG)	B	85	92	~~97~~	10	~~110~~	~~110~~	—	—	—
—	Mohammad Yasin (INA)	B	~~125~~	~~125~~	~~125~~	—	150	155	~~160~~	10	—

=== 73 kg ===
Rank	Athlete	Group	Snatch (kg)				Clean & Jerk (kg)				Total
Rank	Athlete	Group	1	2	3	Rank	1	2	3	Rank	Total
1st place, gold medalist(s)	Shi Zhiyong (CHN)	A	160	164	169	1st place, gold medalist(s)	190	194	—	1st place, gold medalist(s)	363
2nd place, silver medalist(s)	Maksat Meredow (TKM)	A	143	147	~~150~~	6	180	186	189	2nd place, silver medalist(s)	336
3rd place, bronze medalist(s)	Masanori Miyamoto (JPN)	A	145	~~150~~	150	4	185	~~188~~	~~188~~	4	335
4	Rahmat Erwin Abdullah (INA)	A	142	148	~~150~~	5	182	187	~~190~~	3rd place, bronze medalist(s)	335
5	Mirmostafa Javadi (IRI)	A	146	~~151~~	151	3rd place, bronze medalist(s)	183	~~187~~	~~187~~	5	334
6	Sairamkez Akmolda (KAZ)	B	125	130	~~133~~	9	170	175	180	6	310
7	Achinta Sheuli (IND)	B	~~135~~	135	139	8	165	170	~~174~~	7	309
8	Indika Dissanayake (SRI)	B	~~130~~	~~130~~	130	10	155	~~160~~	~~160~~	8	285
9	Zubair Nazari (AFG)	B	90	97	105	11	115	125	132	9	237
—	Yuan Chengfei (CHN)	A	150	~~155~~	155	2nd place, silver medalist(s)	~~185~~	~~185~~	~~186~~	—	—
—	Won Jeong-sik (KOR)	A	~~140~~	~~140~~	140	7	~~170~~	~~170~~	—	—	—

=== 81 kg ===
Rank	Athlete	Group	Snatch (kg)				Clean & Jerk (kg)				Total
Rank	Athlete	Group	1	2	3	Rank	1	2	3	Rank	Total
1st place, gold medalist(s)	Lü Xiaojun (CHN)	A	~~165~~	170	174	2nd place, silver medalist(s)	199	~~208~~	~~208~~	1st place, gold medalist(s)	373
2nd place, silver medalist(s)	Mukhammadkodir Toshtemirov (UZB)	A	155	~~160~~	160	3rd place, bronze medalist(s)	185	190	193	2nd place, silver medalist(s)	353
3rd place, bronze medalist(s)	Rejepbaý Rejepow (TKM)	A	~~155~~	156	~~161~~	5	185	~~195~~	~~198~~	4	341
4	Alexandr Uvarov (KAZ)	A	~~140~~	~~140~~	140	8	175	~~180~~	180	5	320
5	Khojiakbar Olimov (UZB)	A	138	143	146	6	166	~~175~~	~~175~~	6	312
6	Abdullah Dost (AFG)	B	90	~~95~~	95	9	110	117	~~122~~	7	212
—	Li Dayin (CHN)	A	167	172	175	1st place, gold medalist(s)	~~198~~	~~198~~	~~198~~	—	—
—	Hossein Soltani (IRI)	A	156	~~161~~	~~161~~	4	—	—	—	—	—
—	Amur Al-Khanjari (OMA)	A	138	144	~~147~~	7	~~180~~	~~180~~	~~180~~	—	—
—	Takehiro Kasai (JPN)	A	~~143~~	~~143~~	~~144~~	—	180	186	~~191~~	3rd place, bronze medalist(s)	—

=== 89 kg ===
Rank	Athlete	Group	Snatch (kg)				Clean & Jerk (kg)				Total
Rank	Athlete	Group	1	2	3	Rank	1	2	3	Rank	Total
1st place, gold medalist(s)	Kianoush Rostami (IRI)	A	167	~~176~~	~~176~~	2nd place, silver medalist(s)	~~206~~	206	~~216~~	2nd place, silver medalist(s)	373
2nd place, silver medalist(s)	Nurgissa Adiletuly (KAZ)	A	164	169	~~172~~	1st place, gold medalist(s)	197	203	~~207~~	3rd place, bronze medalist(s)	372
3rd place, bronze medalist(s)	Sarvarbek Zafarjonov (UZB)	A	161	166	~~170~~	3rd place, bronze medalist(s)	~~201~~	~~202~~	202	4	368
4	Yu Dong-ju (KOR)	A	160	~~165~~	~~165~~	5	200	~~205~~	207	1st place, gold medalist(s)	367
5	Ali Miri (IRI)	A	160	~~165~~	165	4	198	~~204~~	~~205~~	5	363
6	Rüstem Annaberdiýew (TKM)	A	159	~~163~~	~~165~~	6	~~190~~	192	~~201~~	6	351
7	Emil Moldodosov (KGZ)	B	150	155	~~158~~	7	180	187	~~191~~	7	342
8	Muhammad Zul Ilmi (INA)	A	145	150	153	8	~~182~~	183	~~191~~	8	336
9	Khakimjon Shamshidinov (UZB)	A	143	147	150	9	172	177	182	9	332

=== 96 kg ===
Rank	Athlete	Group	Snatch (kg)				Clean & Jerk (kg)				Total
Rank	Athlete	Group	1	2	3	Rank	1	2	3	Rank	Total
1st place, gold medalist(s)	Tian Tao (CHN)	A	170	175	~~180~~	1st place, gold medalist(s)	~~210~~	211	—	1st place, gold medalist(s)	386
2nd place, silver medalist(s)	Sohrab Moradi (IRI)	A	170	~~174~~	174	3rd place, bronze medalist(s)	210	~~220~~	~~220~~	2nd place, silver medalist(s)	384
3rd place, bronze medalist(s)	Jang Yeon-hak (KOR)	A	170	174	~~176~~	2nd place, silver medalist(s)	200	~~205~~	205	4	379
4	Toshiki Yamamoto (JPN)	A	160	165	~~170~~	5	201	205	~~217~~	3rd place, bronze medalist(s)	370
5	Ali Al-Khazal (KSA)	A	155	~~162~~	~~162~~	6	~~195~~	~~195~~	195	5	350
6	John Tabique (PHI)	B	130	135	~~138~~	9	161	170	~~175~~	7	305
7	Mohammed Hamada (PLE)	B	130	135	~~138~~	8	160	~~169~~	169	8	304
8	John Cheah (SGP)	B	131	136	~~140~~	7	162	~~167~~	~~170~~	9	298
9	Byambajargalyn Tsend-Ayuush (MGL)	B	~~118~~	118	123	10	~~150~~	150	~~158~~	10	273
10	Mirwais Raziqi (AFG)	B	103	~~108~~	~~108~~	11	137	~~143~~	143	11	246
—	Tian Fuxuan (CHN)	A	165	~~171~~	~~171~~	4	~~200~~	~~200~~	—	—	—
—	Chen Po-jen (TPE)	A	~~170~~	~~170~~	~~170~~	—	190	~~200~~	~~202~~	6	—

=== 102 kg ===
Rank	Athlete	Group	Snatch (kg)				Clean & Jerk (kg)				Total
Rank	Athlete	Group	1	2	3	Rank	1	2	3	Rank	Total
1st place, gold medalist(s)	Rasoul Motamedi (IRI)	A	~~166~~	166	173	3rd place, bronze medalist(s)	210	220	227	1st place, gold medalist(s)	400
2nd place, silver medalist(s)	Fares El-Bakh (QAT)	A	~~174~~	~~174~~	174	2nd place, silver medalist(s)	222	~~229~~	~~232~~	2nd place, silver medalist(s)	396
3rd place, bronze medalist(s)	Artyom Antropov (KAZ)	A	160	165	168	5	215	222	~~229~~	3rd place, bronze medalist(s)	390
4	Reza Dehdar (IRI)	A	166	172	175	1st place, gold medalist(s)	206	214	~~219~~	4	389
5	Rakhat Bekbolat (KAZ)	A	165	170	173	4	200	206	213	5	386
6	Bekdoolot Rasulbekov (KGZ)	A	165	~~171~~	~~171~~	6	205	212	~~219~~	6	377
7	Ali Al-Othman (KSA)	B	145	150	153	7	~~185~~	185	190	7	343
8	Kurbonmurod Nomozov (UZB)	B	143	147	~~150~~	8	177	183	187	8	334
9	Jiarul Islam (BAN)	B	110	118	123	9	130	141	~~149~~	9	264

=== 109 kg ===
Rank	Athlete	Group	Snatch (kg)				Clean & Jerk (kg)				Total
Rank	Athlete	Group	1	2	3	Rank	1	2	3	Rank	Total
1st place, gold medalist(s)	Ruslan Nurudinov (UZB)	A	183	~~188~~	188	3rd place, bronze medalist(s)	228	235	241	1st place, gold medalist(s)	429
2nd place, silver medalist(s)	Akbar Djuraev (UZB)	A	188	194	~~197~~	2nd place, silver medalist(s)	225	234	~~238~~	2nd place, silver medalist(s)	428
3rd place, bronze medalist(s)	Yang Zhe (CHN)	A	187	193	200	1st place, gold medalist(s)	215	~~222~~	~~222~~	6	415
4	Jin Yun-seong (KOR)	A	~~180~~	180	~~183~~	4	220	~~223~~	~~224~~	4	400
5	Kia Ghadami (IRI)	A	170	175	~~178~~	7	223	~~226~~	—	3rd place, bronze medalist(s)	398
6	Ryunosuke Mochida (JPN)	A	174	~~180~~	~~180~~	9	215	~~225~~	~~227~~	5	389
7	Öwez Öwezow (TKM)	A	165	175	~~178~~	6	205	~~213~~	~~213~~	8	380
8	Hiroaki Shiraishi (JPN)	A	~~165~~	~~165~~	165	10	~~206~~	206	~~215~~	7	371
9	Ibragim Bersanov (KAZ)	A	170	~~175~~	175	8	195	~~205~~	~~205~~	9	370
—	Seo Hui-yeop (KOR)	A	~~177~~	177	~~181~~	5	~~221~~	—	—	—	—

=== +109 kg ===
Rank	Athlete	Group	Snatch (kg)				Clean & Jerk (kg)				Total
Rank	Athlete	Group	1	2	3	Rank	1	2	3	Rank	Total
1st place, gold medalist(s)	Ali Davoudi (IRI)	A	192	196	~~200~~	1st place, gold medalist(s)	233	239	~~245~~	1st place, gold medalist(s)	435
2nd place, silver medalist(s)	Man Asaad (SYR)	A	186	191	195	2nd place, silver medalist(s)	230	~~238~~	238	2nd place, silver medalist(s)	433
3rd place, bronze medalist(s)	Eishiro Murakami (JPN)	A	180	185	190	3rd place, bronze medalist(s)	225	~~230~~	~~232~~	3rd place, bronze medalist(s)	415
4	Hojamuhammet Toýçyýew (TKM)	A	176	181	~~187~~	4	223	~~231~~	~~232~~	4	404
5	Ham Sang-il (KOR)	A	175	180	~~185~~	5	215	~~223~~	223	5	403
6	Moayad Al-Najjar (SYR)	B	165	~~173~~	~~173~~	6	200	206	~~210~~	6	371
7	Hassan Al-Radhi (KSA)	B	145	150	155	7	~~185~~	185	~~192~~	7	340
8	Fazal Turkman (AFG)	B	125	132	137	8	160	167	~~175~~	8	304

== Women's results ==
=== 45 kg ===
Rank	Athlete	Group	Snatch (kg)				Clean & Jerk (kg)				Total
Rank	Athlete	Group	1	2	3	Rank	1	2	3	Rank	Total
1st place, gold medalist(s)	Jhilli Dalabehera (IND)	A	~~65~~	65	69	1st place, gold medalist(s)	83	88	~~91~~	1st place, gold medalist(s)	157
2nd place, silver medalist(s)	Mary Flor Diaz (PHI)	A	60	~~65~~	~~66~~	2nd place, silver medalist(s)	75	~~80~~	—	2nd place, silver medalist(s)	135

=== 49 kg ===
Rank	Athlete	Group	Snatch (kg)				Clean & Jerk (kg)				Total
Rank	Athlete	Group	1	2	3	Rank	1	2	3	Rank	Total
1st place, gold medalist(s)	Hou Zhihui (CHN)	A	90	94	96	1st place, gold medalist(s)	110	115	117	3rd place, bronze medalist(s)	213
2nd place, silver medalist(s)	Jiang Huihua (CHN)	A	~~89~~	89	~~95~~	2nd place, silver medalist(s)	113	118	~~125~~	2nd place, silver medalist(s)	207
3rd place, bronze medalist(s)	Mirabai Chanu (IND)	A	~~85~~	~~85~~	86	4	113	117	119	1st place, gold medalist(s)	205
4	Windy Cantika Aisah (INA)	A	82	~~86~~	87	3rd place, bronze medalist(s)	102	~~106~~	~~106~~	4	189
5	Vương Thị Huyền (VIE)	A	~~78~~	78	~~80~~	5	96	~~99~~	99	6	177
6	Fang Wan-ling (TPE)	A	76	~~80~~	~~80~~	6	95	100	~~103~~	5	176
7	Ýulduz Jumabaýewa (TKM)	A	72	~~75~~	75	7	~~98~~	98	~~101~~	8	173
8	Hiromi Miyake (JPN)	A	73	~~75~~	~~75~~	9	98	~~100~~	—	7	171
9	Mizuki Yanagida (JPN)	A	70	74	~~77~~	8	88	92	~~95~~	10	166
10	Elien Perez (PHI)	A	~~73~~	73	~~76~~	10	92	~~95~~	~~95~~	9	165

=== 55 kg ===
Rank	Athlete	Group	Snatch (kg)				Clean & Jerk (kg)				Total
Rank	Athlete	Group	1	2	3	Rank	1	2	3	Rank	Total
1st place, gold medalist(s)	Liao Qiuyun (CHN)	A	95	98	~~100~~	3rd place, bronze medalist(s)	120	124	~~128~~	1st place, gold medalist(s)	222
2nd place, silver medalist(s)	Li Yajun (CHN)	A	98	~~101~~	101	1st place, gold medalist(s)	120	~~123~~	~~123~~	2nd place, silver medalist(s)	221
3rd place, bronze medalist(s)	Muattar Nabieva (UZB)	A	95	99	~~102~~	2nd place, silver medalist(s)	114	~~118~~	~~118~~	6	213
4	Hidilyn Diaz (PHI)	A	~~90~~	90	94	4	118	~~121~~	~~122~~	4	212
5	Zulfiya Chinshanlo (KAZ)	A	88	92	~~94~~	5	118	~~122~~	~~122~~	3rd place, bronze medalist(s)	210
6	Ham Eun-ji (KOR)	B	~~83~~	~~83~~	84	8	108	113	116	5	200
7	Kristina Şermetowa (TKM)	A	88	~~90~~	~~90~~	6	110	~~113~~	~~113~~	7	198
8	Ayana Sadoyama (JPN)	A	85	87	~~88~~	7	105	~~107~~	~~109~~	9	192
9	Juliana Klarisa (INA)	B	77	~~80~~	81	9	103	~~108~~	108	8	189
10	Kanae Yagi (JPN)	A	~~80~~	80	~~83~~	10	~~102~~	102	~~105~~	10	182
11	Sneha Soren (IND)	B	68	71	~~73~~	11	93	~~98~~	~~100~~	11	164
—	Poupak Basami (IRI)	B	~~71~~	~~71~~	~~73~~	—	91	~~94~~	~~95~~	12	—

=== 59 kg ===
Rank	Athlete	Group	Snatch (kg)				Clean & Jerk (kg)				Total
Rank	Athlete	Group	1	2	3	Rank	1	2	3	Rank	Total
1st place, gold medalist(s)	Kuo Hsing-chun (TPE)	A	105	107	110	1st place, gold medalist(s)	~~133~~	133	137	1st place, gold medalist(s)	247
2nd place, silver medalist(s)	Luo Xiaomin (CHN)	A	97	100	102	2nd place, silver medalist(s)	123	125	~~130~~	2nd place, silver medalist(s)	227
3rd place, bronze medalist(s)	Hoàng Thị Duyên (VIE)	A	95	98	100	3rd place, bronze medalist(s)	112	116	~~121~~	5	216
4	Polina Gurýewa (TKM)	A	91	94	~~96~~	4	113	~~117~~	117	4	211
5	Mikiko Ando (JPN)	A	85	~~90~~	~~95~~	5	115	120	124	3rd place, bronze medalist(s)	209
6	Nigora Abdullaeva (UZB)	A	~~80~~	80	~~85~~	6	100	~~104~~	~~104~~	6	180
7	Margaret Colonia (PHI)	A	73	~~78~~	78	7	98	~~102~~	~~102~~	7	176
8	Sanju Chaudhary (NEP)	B	73	~~77~~	~~78~~	8	90	~~98~~	~~98~~	8	163

=== 64 kg ===
Rank	Athlete	Group	Snatch (kg)				Clean & Jerk (kg)				Total
Rank	Athlete	Group	1	2	3	Rank	1	2	3	Rank	Total
1st place, gold medalist(s)	Chen Wen-huei (TPE)	A	94	98	100	1st place, gold medalist(s)	119	125	128	1st place, gold medalist(s)	228
2nd place, silver medalist(s)	Elreen Ando (PHI)	A	94	~~97~~	~~97~~	3rd place, bronze medalist(s)	115	119	~~121~~	2nd place, silver medalist(s)	213
3rd place, bronze medalist(s)	Han So-jin (KOR)	A	~~96~~	96	~~99~~	2nd place, silver medalist(s)	115	~~118~~	~~118~~	3rd place, bronze medalist(s)	211
4	Kim Ye-ra (KOR)	A	~~92~~	~~92~~	92	5	113	~~116~~	~~116~~	4	205
5	Gulnur Ybray (KAZ)	A	84	87	~~90~~	6	103	106	110	5	197
6	Madinabonu Djuraeva (UZB)	A	77	~~80~~	82	7	95	100	~~104~~	6	182
7	Kamala Shrestha (NEP)	B	68	~~73~~	73	8	85	90	93	7	166
—	Akane Yoshida (JPN)	A	90	~~93~~	94	4	~~118~~	~~118~~	~~118~~	—	—
—	Namika Matsumoto (JPN)	A	~~85~~	~~85~~	~~85~~	—	—	—	—	—	—
—	Deng Wei (CHN)	A	—	—	—	—	—	—	—	—	—

=== 71 kg ===
Rank	Athlete	Group	Snatch (kg)				Clean & Jerk (kg)				Total
Rank	Athlete	Group	1	2	3	Rank	1	2	3	Rank	Total
1st place, gold medalist(s)	Vanessa Sarno (PHI)	A	93	97	101	2nd place, silver medalist(s)	120	124	128	1st place, gold medalist(s)	229
2nd place, silver medalist(s)	Gülnabat Kadyrowa (TKM)	A	97	100	102	1st place, gold medalist(s)	~~120~~	121	~~124~~	3rd place, bronze medalist(s)	223
3rd place, bronze medalist(s)	Yekaterina Bykova (KAZ)	A	88	91	~~93~~	3rd place, bronze medalist(s)	117	122	~~125~~	2nd place, silver medalist(s)	213
4	Aisha Omarova (KAZ)	A	80	83	86	4	110	114	~~118~~	4	200
5	Mashkhura Rustamova (UZB)	A	73	76	78	5	93	97	101	5	179
6	Forough Younesi (IRI)	A	~~75~~	75	~~81~~	6	93	~~102~~	~~103~~	6	168

=== 76 kg ===
Rank	Athlete	Group	Snatch (kg)				Clean & Jerk (kg)				Total
Rank	Athlete	Group	1	2	3	Rank	1	2	3	Rank	Total
1st place, gold medalist(s)	Zhang Wangli (CHN)	A	110	~~115~~	115	1st place, gold medalist(s)	139	148	~~151~~	1st place, gold medalist(s)	263
2nd place, silver medalist(s)	Kim Su-hyeon (KOR)	A	102	106	~~111~~	2nd place, silver medalist(s)	132	~~136~~	138	2nd place, silver medalist(s)	244
3rd place, bronze medalist(s)	Kristel Macrohon (PHI)	A	90	95	99	4	120	~~125~~	126	3rd place, bronze medalist(s)	225
4	Kumushkhon Fayzullaeva (UZB)	A	96	~~101~~	~~101~~	5	116	121	125	4	221
5	Kang Yeoun-hee (KOR)	A	95	100	~~103~~	3rd place, bronze medalist(s)	~~120~~	120	~~125~~	5	220
6	Ayumi Kamiya (JPN)	A	90	~~95~~	95	6	110	115	~~120~~	6	210
7	Mahassen Fattouh (LBN)	A	~~86~~	86	90	7	110	115	~~120~~	7	205
8	Eri Mitsuke (JPN)	A	75	80	~~85~~	8	95	100	~~105~~	8	180

=== 81 kg ===
Rank	Athlete	Group	Snatch (kg)				Clean & Jerk (kg)				Total
Rank	Athlete	Group	1	2	3	Rank	1	2	3	Rank	Total
1st place, gold medalist(s)	Jang Hyeon-ju (KOR)	A	98	101	103	2nd place, silver medalist(s)	125	130	133	1st place, gold medalist(s)	236
2nd place, silver medalist(s)	Karina Kuzganbayeva (KAZ)	A	99	102	104	1st place, gold medalist(s)	125	128	~~130~~	2nd place, silver medalist(s)	232
3rd place, bronze medalist(s)	Aýsoltan Toýçyýewa (TKM)	A	93	96	~~98~~	3rd place, bronze medalist(s)	118	~~121~~	122	5	218
4	Nigora Suvonova (UZB)	A	~~90~~	90	94	4	115	119	123	3rd place, bronze medalist(s)	217
5	Elham Hosseini (IRI)	A	91	~~99~~	~~99~~	6	111	118	122	4	213
6	Elnaz Bajalani (IRI)	A	85	93	~~97~~	5	100	~~107~~	109	6	202
7	Chathurika Priyanthi (SRI)	A	80	86	~~88~~	7	102	106	~~108~~	7	192
8	Monira Kazi (BAN)	A	65	~~70~~	~~70~~	8	85	90	~~95~~	8	155

=== 87 kg ===
Rank	Athlete	Group	Snatch (kg)				Clean & Jerk (kg)				Total
Rank	Athlete	Group	1	2	3	Rank	1	2	3	Rank	Total
1st place, gold medalist(s)	Wang Zhouyu (CHN)	A	119	~~124~~	126	1st place, gold medalist(s)	148	154	160	1st place, gold medalist(s)	286
2nd place, silver medalist(s)	Kang Yue (CHN)	A	~~118~~	118	~~125~~	2nd place, silver medalist(s)	149	~~155~~	155	2nd place, silver medalist(s)	273
3rd place, bronze medalist(s)	Mönkhjantsangiin Ankhtsetseg (MGL)	A	108	~~111~~	111	3rd place, bronze medalist(s)	~~136~~	136	~~140~~	3rd place, bronze medalist(s)	247
4	Tursunoy Jabborova (UZB)	A	105	109	~~112~~	4	127	~~132~~	132	4	241
5	Raushan Meshitkhanova (KAZ)	A	98	101	~~103~~	5	110	115	~~120~~	5	216
6	Mami Shimamoto (JPN)	A	95	~~100~~	100	6	108	113	~~118~~	6	213
7	Anuradha Pavunraj (IND)	A	~~91~~	91	~~95~~	7	110	~~115~~	—	7	201
8	Bat-Orgilyn Oyuunbayar (MGL)	A	77	~~81~~	~~81~~	8	93	96	~~100~~	8	173

=== +87 kg ===
Rank	Athlete	Group	Snatch (kg)				Clean & Jerk (kg)				Total
Rank	Athlete	Group	1	2	3	Rank	1	2	3	Rank	Total
1st place, gold medalist(s)	Li Wenwen (CHN)	A	135	143	148	1st place, gold medalist(s)	175	187	—	1st place, gold medalist(s)	335
2nd place, silver medalist(s)	Son Young-hee (KOR)	A	115	~~120~~	120	2nd place, silver medalist(s)	155	159	~~161~~	2nd place, silver medalist(s)	279
3rd place, bronze medalist(s)	Aizada Muptilda (KAZ)	A	112	116	118	3rd place, bronze medalist(s)	143	147	151	3rd place, bronze medalist(s)	269
4	Lee Seon-mi (KOR)	A	112	~~115~~	~~115~~	4	143	146	~~148~~	4	258
5	Nurul Akmal (INA)	A	106	~~111~~	111	5	~~140~~	140	~~147~~	5	251
6	Dolera Davronova (UZB)	A	~~85~~	85	90	6	115	120	122	6	212
7	Fatemeh Yousefi (IRI)	A	~~82~~	82	87	7	110	~~119~~	121	7	208
