= 2019 Ready Steady Tokyo Weightlifting Test Event =

Weightlifting competition

Ready Steady Tokyo
- Venue: Tokyo International Forum
- Location: Tokyo, Japan
- Dates: 6–7 July 2019
- Competitors: 73 from 10 nations

The 2019 Ready Steady Tokyo Weightlifting Test Event was a weightlifting tournament, consisting of a series of test matches. It was held in Tokyo, Japan, from July 6 to 7, 2019. The tournament served as a test event for the weightlifting tournament at the 2020 Summer Olympics. The event also doubled as the 2019 Japan-China-Korea Friendship Tournament. The tournament was overseen by the International Weightlifting Federation making any records set in the tournament official.

== Competition schedule ==
Schedule
Date	Jul 6	Jul 7
Men's 61 kg	F	
Men's 67 kg	F	
Men's 73 kg	F	
Men's 81 kg	F	
Men's 96 kg		F
Men's 102 kg		F
Men's 109 kg		F
Men's +109 kg		F
Women's 49 kg	F	
Women's 55 kg	F	
Women's 59 kg	F	
Women's 64 kg	F	
Women's 71 kg	F	
Women's 76 kg	F	
Women's 81 kg		F
Women's 87 kg		F
Women's +87 kg		F

== Medal summary ==
Men

Event	Gold		Silver		Bronze	
61 kg
Snatch	Qin Fulin; China	140 kg	Li Fabin; China	136 kg	Hayato Hirai; Japan	120 kg
Clean & Jerk	Qin Fulin; China	165 kg	Li Fabin; China	165 kg	Hayato Hirai; Japan	150 kg
Total	Qin Fulin; China	305 kg	Li Fabin; China	301 kg	Hayato Hirai; Japan	270 kg
67 kg
Snatch	Huang Minhao; China	155 kg WR	Yoichi Itokazu; Japan	132 kg	Lee Chang-ho; South Korea	129 kg
Clean & Jerk	Chen Lijun; China	180 kg	Huang Minhao; China	173 kg	Lee Chang-ho; South Korea	166 kg
Total	Huang Minhao; China	328 kg	Lee Chang-ho; South Korea	295 kg	Yoichi Itokazu; Japan	294 kg
73 kg
Snatch	Shi Zhiyong; China	155 kg	Masanori Miyamoto; Japan	151 kg	Yuan Chengfei; China	150 kg
Clean & Jerk	Bak Joo-hyo; South Korea	190 kg	Shi Zhiyong; China	190 kg	Masanori Miyamoto; Japan	190 kg
Total	Shi Zhiyong; China	345 kg	Masanori Miyamoto; Japan	341 kg	Yuan Chengfei; China	337 kg
81 kg
Snatch	Li Dayin; China	163 kg	Lü Xiaojun; China	160 kg	Takehiro Kasai; Japan	143 kg
Clean & Jerk	Li Dayin; China	202 kg	Lü Xiaojun; China	190 kg	Takehiro Kasai; Japan	187 kg
Total	Li Dayin; China	365 kg	Lü Xiaojun; China	350 kg	Takehiro Kasai; Japan	330 kg
96 kg
Snatch	Tian Tao; China	175 kg	Han Jung-hoon; South Korea	150 kg	not awarded	
Clean & Jerk	Tian Tao; China	231 kg WR	Han Jung-hoon; South Korea	190 kg	not awarded	
Total	Tian Tao; China	406 kg	Han Jung-hoon; South Korea	340 kg	not awarded	
102 kg
Snatch	Jin Yun-seong; South Korea	175 kg	not awarded			
Clean & Jerk	Jin Yun-seong; South Korea	211 kg	not awarded			
Total	Jin Yun-seong; South Korea	386 kg	not awarded			
109 kg
Snatch	Yang Zhe; China	190 kg	Rodion Bochkov; Russia	178 kg	Jeong Ki-sam; South Korea	175 kg
Clean & Jerk	Yang Zhe; China	216 kg	Seo Hui-yeop; South Korea	215 kg	Hiroaki Shiraishi; Japan	211 kg
Total	Yang Zhe; China	406 kg	Rodion Bochkov; Russia	388 kg	Seo Hui-yeop; South Korea	386 kg
109+ kg
Snatch	Eishiro Murakami; Japan	185 kg	Ruslan Albegov; Russia	184 kg	Jeon Dae-un; South Korea	176 kg
Clean & Jerk	Eishiro Murakami; Japan	227 kg	Ruslan Albegov; Russia	215 kg	Jeon Dae-un; South Korea	210 kg
Total	Eishiro Murakami; Japan	412 kg	Ruslan Albegov; Russia	399 kg	Jeon Dae-un; South Korea	386 kg

Women

Event	Gold		Silver		Bronze	
49 kg
Snatch	Hou Zhihui; China	95 kg WR	Jiang Huihua; China	91 kg	Ibuki Takahashi; Japan	74 kg
Clean & Jerk	Jiang Huihua; China	113 kg	Hou Zhihui; China	110 kg	Ibuki Takahashi; Japan	97 kg
Total	Hou Zhihui; China	205 kg	Jiang Huihua; China	204 kg	Ibuki Takahashi; Japan	171 kg
55 kg
Snatch	Liao Qiuyun; China	98 kg	Li Yajun; China	95 kg	Ham Eun-ji; South Korea	87 kg
Clean & Jerk	Liao Qiuyun; China	120 kg	Ham Eun-ji; South Korea	116 kg	Kanae Yagi; Japan	109 kg
Total	Liao Qiuyun; China	218 kg	Ham Eun-ji; South Korea	203 kg	Kanae Yagi; Japan	193 kg
59 kg
Snatch	Chen Guiming; China	99 kg	Mikiko Ando; Japan	95 kg	Kim So-hwa; South Korea	90 kg
Clean & Jerk	Chen Guiming; China	130 kg	Mikiko Ando; Japan	125 kg	Kim So-hwa; South Korea	114 kg
Total	Chen Guiming; China	229 kg	Mikiko Ando; Japan	220 kg	Kim So-hwa; South Korea	204 kg
64 kg
Snatch	Deng Wei; China	110 kg	Han So-jin; South Korea	100 kg	Kim Ye-ra; South Korea	97 kg
Clean & Jerk	Deng Wei; China	138 kg	Kim Ye-ra; South Korea	120 kg	Han So-jin; South Korea	117 kg
Total	Deng Wei; China	248 kg	Han So-jin; South Korea	217 kg	Kim Ye-ra; South Korea	217 kg
71 kg
Snatch	Miku Ishii; Japan	96 kg	not awarded			
Clean & Jerk	Miku Ishii; Japan	115 kg	not awarded			
Total	Miku Ishii; Japan	211 kg	not awarded			
76 kg
Snatch	Zhang Wangli; China	120 kg	Kim Su-hyeon; South Korea	109 kg	Mun Min-hee; South Korea	103 kg
Clean & Jerk	Zhang Wangli; China	150 kg	Kim Su-hyeon; South Korea	133 kg	Mun Min-hee; South Korea	125 kg
Total	Zhang Wangli; China	270 kg	Kim Su-hyeon; South Korea	242 kg	Mun Min-hee; South Korea	228 kg
81 kg
Snatch	Kang Yeoun-hee; South Korea	101 kg	Lee Ji-eun; South Korea	97 kg	not awarded	
Clean & Jerk	Kang Yeoun-hee; South Korea	125 kg	Lee Ji-eun; South Korea	110 kg	not awarded	
Total	Kang Yeoun-hee; South Korea	226 kg	Lee Ji-eun; South Korea	207 kg	not awarded	
87 kg
Snatch	Wang Zhouyu; China	125 kg	Marissa Klingseis; United States	104 kg	Mami Shimamoto; Japan	104 kg
Clean & Jerk	Wang Zhouyu; China	153 kg	Marissa Klingseis; United States	132 kg	Kseniia Paskhina; Russia	123 kg
Total	Wang Zhouyu; China	278 kg	Marissa Klingseis; United States	236 kg	Kseniia Paskhina; Russia	222 kg
87+ kg
Snatch	Li Wenwen; China	141 kg	Tatiana Kashirina; Russia	140 kg	Kim Ji-hyeon; South Korea	115 kg
Clean & Jerk	Li Wenwen; China	185 kg	Tatiana Kashirina; Russia	182 kg	Kim Ji-hyeon; South Korea	143 kg
Total	Li Wenwen; China	326 kg	Tatiana Kashirina; Russia	322 kg	Kim Ji-hyeon; South Korea	258 kg

== Medal table ==
Ranking by Big (Total result) medals

* Host nation (Japan)

Rank	Nation	Gold	Silver	Bronze	Total
1	China	13	3	1	17
2	South Korea	2	6	6	14
3	Japan*	2	2	5	9
4	Russia	0	3	1	4
5	United States	0	1	0	1
Totals (5 entries)		17	15	13	45

Ranking by all medals: Big (Total result) and Small (Snatch and Clean & Jerk)

* Host nation (Japan)

Rank	Nation	Gold	Silver	Bronze	Total
1	China	38	12	2	52
2	South Korea	7	16	20	43
3	Japan*	6	6	15	27
4	Russia	0	8	2	10
5	United States	0	3	0	3
Totals (5 entries)		51	45	39	135

== Participating nations ==
A total of 73 competitors from 10 nations participated.

- Belgium (1)
- China (20)
- Chinese Taipei (1)
- Finland (1)
- France (1)
- Japan (20)
- Kazakhstan (3)
- Russia (4)
- South Korea (20)
- United States (2)

== Men's results ==
=== 61 kg ===
Rank	Athlete	Group	Snatch (kg)				Clean & Jerk (kg)				Total
Rank	Athlete	Group	1	2	3	Rank	1	2	3	Rank	Total
1st place, gold medalist(s)	Qin Fulin (CHN)	A	135	140	~~142~~	1st place, gold medalist(s)	~~165~~	165	~~170~~	1st place, gold medalist(s)	305
2nd place, silver medalist(s)	Li Fabin (CHN)	A	136	~~141~~	~~141~~	2nd place, silver medalist(s)	155	160	165	2nd place, silver medalist(s)	301
3rd place, bronze medalist(s)	Hayato Hirai (JPN)	A	~~115~~	115	120	3rd place, bronze medalist(s)	145	150	~~153~~	3rd place, bronze medalist(s)	270
4	Kim Young-ho (KOR)	A	110	116	~~121~~	4	130	135	140	4	256

=== 67 kg ===
Rank	Athlete	Group	Snatch (kg)				Clean & Jerk (kg)				Total
Rank	Athlete	Group	1	2	3	Rank	1	2	3	Rank	Total
1st place, gold medalist(s)	Huang Minhao (CHN)	A	150	155	~~157~~	1st place, gold medalist(s)	166	~~173~~	173	2nd place, silver medalist(s)	328
2nd place, silver medalist(s)	Lee Chang-ho (KOR)	A	~~125~~	125	129	3rd place, bronze medalist(s)	160	166	~~171~~	3rd place, bronze medalist(s)	295
3rd place, bronze medalist(s)	Yoichi Itokazu (JPN)	A	128	132	~~135~~	2nd place, silver medalist(s)	158	~~162~~	162	4	294
—	Chen Lijun (CHN)	A	~~143~~	~~143~~	~~143~~	—	170	180	—	1st place, gold medalist(s)	—

=== 73 kg ===
Rank	Athlete	Group	Snatch (kg)				Clean & Jerk (kg)				Total
Rank	Athlete	Group	1	2	3	Rank	1	2	3	Rank	Total
1st place, gold medalist(s)	Shi Zhiyong (CHN)	A	155	~~161~~	~~161~~	1st place, gold medalist(s)	~~180~~	180	190	2nd place, silver medalist(s)	345
2nd place, silver medalist(s)	Masanori Miyamoto (JPN)	A	146	151	~~155~~	2nd place, silver medalist(s)	180	185	190	3rd place, bronze medalist(s)	341
3rd place, bronze medalist(s)	Yuan Chengfei (CHN)	A	150	~~155~~	~~155~~	3rd place, bronze medalist(s)	180	187	~~192~~	4	337
4	Bak Joo-hyo (KOR)	A	147	~~152~~	~~152~~	4	181	190	~~195~~	1st place, gold medalist(s)	337
5	Mitsunori Konnai (JPN)	A	~~140~~	~~140~~	140	5	173	178	~~182~~	5	318

=== 81 kg ===
Rank	Athlete	Group	Snatch (kg)				Clean & Jerk (kg)				Total
Rank	Athlete	Group	1	2	3	Rank	1	2	3	Rank	Total
1st place, gold medalist(s)	Li Dayin (CHN)	A	163	~~170~~	~~170~~	1st place, gold medalist(s)	193	198	202	1st place, gold medalist(s)	365
2nd place, silver medalist(s)	Lü Xiaojun (CHN)	A	~~155~~	155	160	2nd place, silver medalist(s)	180	190	—	2nd place, silver medalist(s)	350
3rd place, bronze medalist(s)	Takehiro Kasai (JPN)	A	~~143~~	~~143~~	143	3rd place, bronze medalist(s)	181	187	~~190~~	3rd place, bronze medalist(s)	330
4	Won Jeong-sik (KOR)	A	130	138	141	4	170	178	182	4	323
5	Yuki Hara (JPN)	A	136	~~141~~	~~141~~	5	173	180	~~187~~	5	316
6	Kim Woo-jae (KOR)	A	110	115	120	6	140	145	—	6	265

=== 96 kg ===
Rank	Athlete	Group	Snatch (kg)				Clean & Jerk (kg)				Total
Rank	Athlete	Group	1	2	3	Rank	1	2	3	Rank	Total
1st place, gold medalist(s)	Tian Tao (CHN)	A	170	175	~~180~~	1st place, gold medalist(s)	210	~~220~~	231	1st place, gold medalist(s)	406
2nd place, silver medalist(s)	Han Jung-hoon (KOR)	A	140	150	~~155~~	2nd place, silver medalist(s)	180	190	~~200~~	2nd place, silver medalist(s)	340
—	Toshiki Yamamoto (JPN)	A	—	—	—	—	—	—	—	—	—

=== 102 kg ===
Rank	Athlete	Group	Snatch (kg)				Clean & Jerk (kg)				Total
Rank	Athlete	Group	1	2	3	Rank	1	2	3	Rank	Total
1st place, gold medalist(s)	Jin Yun-seong (KOR)	A	167	175	~~182~~	1st place, gold medalist(s)	201	211	~~217~~	1st place, gold medalist(s)	386

=== 109 kg ===
Rank	Athlete	Group	Snatch (kg)				Clean & Jerk (kg)				Total
Rank	Athlete	Group	1	2	3	Rank	1	2	3	Rank	Total
1st place, gold medalist(s)	Yang Zhe (CHN)	A	180	190	~~197~~	1st place, gold medalist(s)	205	211	216	1st place, gold medalist(s)	406
2nd place, silver medalist(s)	Rodion Bochkov (RUS)	A	173	178	~~181~~	2nd place, silver medalist(s)	202	208	210	5	388
3rd place, bronze medalist(s)	Seo Hui-yeop (KOR)	A	165	171	~~181~~	5	210	215	~~218~~	2nd place, silver medalist(s)	386
4	Jeong Ki-sam (KOR)	A	170	175	~~178~~	3rd place, bronze medalist(s)	200	210	~~214~~	4	385
5	Hiroaki Shiraishi (JPN)	A	165	170	~~141~~	6	190	200	211	3rd place, bronze medalist(s)	381
6	Ibragim Bersanov (KAZ)	A	170	174	~~177~~	4	190	196	202	7	376
7	Wesley Kitts (USA)	A	160	165	~~170~~	8	195	203	~~211~~	6	368
8	Ilya Ilyin (KAZ)	A	160	165	~~170~~	7	190	200	—	8	365
9	Taro Tanaka (JPN)	A	~~160~~	160	~~165~~	9	183	190	~~195~~	9	'350

=== +109 kg ===
Rank	Athlete	Group	Snatch (kg)				Clean & Jerk (kg)				Total
Rank	Athlete	Group	1	2	3	Rank	1	2	3	Rank	Total
1st place, gold medalist(s)	Eishiro Murakami (JPN)	A	175	180	185	1st place, gold medalist(s)	215	221	227	1st place, gold medalist(s)	412
2nd place, silver medalist(s)	Ruslan Albegov (RUS)	A	178	184	~~188~~	2nd place, silver medalist(s)	215	~~223~~	~~223~~	2nd place, silver medalist(s)	399
3rd place, bronze medalist(s)	Jeon Dae-un (KOR)	A	170	176	~~181~~	3rd place, bronze medalist(s)	~~210~~	210	—	3rd place, bronze medalist(s)	386
4	Anthony Coullet (FRA)	A	150	155	—	4	~~200~~	200	—	4	355
5	Teemu Roininen (FIN)	A	148	~~152~~	~~152~~	5	~~190~~	190	195	5	343
DSQ^{[a]}	Chen Shih-chieh (TPE)	A	180	185	~~190~~	—	220	230	~~240~~	—	—

^{a} Chen originally won the gold medal but was disqualified in February 2019 by the Court of Arbitration for Sport after a doping violation.

== Women's results ==
=== 49 kg ===
Rank	Athlete	Group	Snatch (kg)				Clean & Jerk (kg)				Total
Rank	Athlete	Group	1	2	3	Rank	1	2	3	Rank	Total
1st place, gold medalist(s)	Hou Zhihui (CHN)	A	89	93	95	1st place, gold medalist(s)	~~110~~	110	~~116~~	2nd place, silver medalist(s)	205
2nd place, silver medalist(s)	Jiang Huihua (CHN)	A	88	91	~~93~~	2nd place, silver medalist(s)	105	110	113	1st place, gold medalist(s)	204
3rd place, bronze medalist(s)	Ibuki Takahashi (JPN)	A	74	~~77~~	~~77~~	3rd place, bronze medalist(s)	97	~~100~~	~~100~~	3rd place, bronze medalist(s)	171
4	Lee Seul-ki (KOR)	A	65	70	~~75~~	4	75	80	85	4	155
—	Hiromi Miyake (JPN)	A	—	—	—	—	—	—	—	—	—

=== 55 kg ===
Rank	Athlete	Group	Snatch (kg)				Clean & Jerk (kg)				Total
Rank	Athlete	Group	1	2	3	Rank	1	2	3	Rank	Total
1st place, gold medalist(s)	Liao Qiuyun (CHN)	A	95	98	~~100~~	1st place, gold medalist(s)	115	120	—	1st place, gold medalist(s)	218
2nd place, silver medalist(s)	Ham Eun-ji (KOR)	A	83	~~87~~	87	3rd place, bronze medalist(s)	109	114	116	2nd place, silver medalist(s)	203
3rd place, bronze medalist(s)	Kanae Yagi (JPN)	A	82	~~84~~	84	4	104	107	109	3rd place, bronze medalist(s)	193
4	Ayana Sadoyama (JPN)	A	~~78~~	78	81	5	100	102	~~105~~	4	183
—	Li Yajun (CHN)	A	~~95~~	95	—	2nd place, silver medalist(s)	—	—	—	—	—

=== 59 kg ===
Rank	Athlete	Group	Snatch (kg)				Clean & Jerk (kg)				Total
Rank	Athlete	Group	1	2	3	Rank	1	2	3	Rank	Total
1st place, gold medalist(s)	Chen Guiming (CHN)	A	95	~~99~~	99	1st place, gold medalist(s)	125	~~130~~	130	1st place, gold medalist(s)	229
2nd place, silver medalist(s)	Mikiko Ando (JPN)	A	90	~~95~~	95	2nd place, silver medalist(s)	120	125	—	2nd place, silver medalist(s)	220
3rd place, bronze medalist(s)	Kim So-hwa (KOR)	A	90	~~94~~	~~94~~	3rd place, bronze medalist(s)	~~110~~	110	114	3rd place, bronze medalist(s)	204

=== 64 kg ===
Rank	Athlete	Group	Snatch (kg)				Clean & Jerk (kg)				Total
Rank	Athlete	Group	1	2	3	Rank	1	2	3	Rank	Total
1st place, gold medalist(s)	Deng Wei (CHN)	A	105	~~110~~	110	1st place, gold medalist(s)	130	135	138	1st place, gold medalist(s)	248
2nd place, silver medalist(s)	Han So-jun (KOR)	A	97	~~100~~	100	2nd place, silver medalist(s)	112	117	~~121~~	3rd place, bronze medalist(s)	217
3rd place, bronze medalist(s)	Kim Ye-ra (KOR)	A	93	~~97~~	97	3rd place, bronze medalist(s)	115	120	~~122~~	2nd place, silver medalist(s)	217
4	Namika Matsumoto (JPN)	A	90	~~93~~	~~93~~	4	110	114	~~116~~	4	204
—	Akane Yoshida (JPN)	A	—	—	—	—	—	—	—	—	—

=== 71 kg ===
Rank	Athlete	Group	Snatch (kg)				Clean & Jerk (kg)				Total
Rank	Athlete	Group	1	2	3	Rank	1	2	3	Rank	Total
1st place, gold medalist(s)	Miku Ishii (JPN)	A	93	96	~~98~~	1st place, gold medalist(s)	115	~~120~~	~~120~~	1st place, gold medalist(s)	211

=== 76 kg ===
Rank	Athlete	Group	Snatch (kg)				Clean & Jerk (kg)				Total
Rank	Athlete	Group	1	2	3	Rank	1	2	3	Rank	Total
1st place, gold medalist(s)	Zhang Wangli (CHN)	A	110	115	120	1st place, gold medalist(s)	140	145	150	1st place, gold medalist(s)	270
2nd place, silver medalist(s)	Kim Su-hyeon (KOR)	A	103	106	109	2nd place, silver medalist(s)	~~133~~	133	~~138~~	2nd place, silver medalist(s)	242
3rd place, bronze medalist(s)	Mun Min-hee (KOR)	A	95	100	103	3rd place, bronze medalist(s)	120	125	~~128~~	3rd place, bronze medalist(s)	228
4	Ayumi Kamiya (JPN)	A	90	95	97	4	110	113	~~115~~	4	210

=== 81 kg ===
Rank	Athlete	Group	Snatch (kg)				Clean & Jerk (kg)				Total
Rank	Athlete	Group	1	2	3	Rank	1	2	3	Rank	Total
1st place, gold medalist(s)	Kang Yeoun-hee (KOR)	A	96	101	~~105~~	1st place, gold medalist(s)	120	125	~~130~~	1st place, gold medalist(s)	226
2nd place, silver medalist(s)	Lee Ji-eun (KOR)	A	93	97	~~102~~	2nd place, silver medalist(s)	110	~~115~~	~~120~~	2nd place, silver medalist(s)	207

=== 87 kg ===
Rank	Athlete	Group	Snatch (kg)				Clean & Jerk (kg)				Total
Rank	Athlete	Group	1	2	3	Rank	1	2	3	Rank	Total
1st place, gold medalist(s)	Wang Zhouyu (CHN)	A	115	120	125	1st place, gold medalist(s)	145	153	~~158~~	1st place, gold medalist(s)	278
2nd place, silver medalist(s)	Marissa Klingseis (USA)	A	104	~~108~~	~~108~~	2nd place, silver medalist(s)	132	~~137~~	~~137~~	2nd place, silver medalist(s)	236
3rd place, bronze medalist(s)	Kseniia Paskhina (RUS)	A	~~99~~	99	~~103~~	5	120	123	~~125~~	3rd place, bronze medalist(s)	222
4	Anna Van Bellinghen (BEL)	A	95	99	~~102~~	4	113	119	122	4	221
—	Larisa Kobeleva (KAZ)	A	—	—	—	—	—	—	—	—	—
—	Mami Shimamoto (JPN)	A	98	102	104	3rd place, bronze medalist(s)	~~120~~	~~120~~	~~120~~	—	—

=== +87 kg ===
Rank	Athlete	Group	Snatch (kg)				Clean & Jerk (kg)				Total
Rank	Athlete	Group	1	2	3	Rank	1	2	3	Rank	Total
1st place, gold medalist(s)	Li Wenwen (CHN)	A	135	141	~~145~~	1st place, gold medalist(s)	170	180	185	1st place, gold medalist(s)	326
2nd place, silver medalist(s)	Tatiana Kashirina (RUS)	A	140	~~145~~	~~146~~	2nd place, silver medalist(s)	178	182	~~187~~	2nd place, silver medalist(s)	322
3rd place, bronze medalist(s)	Kim Ji-hyeon (KOR)	A	108	~~114~~	115	3rd place, bronze medalist(s)	143	~~148~~	~~151~~	2nd place, silver medalist(s)	258
—	Meng Suping (CHN)	A	—	—	—	—	—	—	—	—	—
