= 2019 IWF Fuzhou World Cup =

2019 IWF World Cup
- Location: Fuzhou, China
- Dates: 23–27 February
- Competitors: 107

The 2019 IWF World Cup in weightlifting was held in Fuzhou, China from 23 to 27 February 2019. It was also a qualification event for the 2020 Summer Olympics in Tokyo.

There was 1 men's world record, 8 women's world records, and 6 junior world records set during the competition.

== Medal overview ==
=== Men ===
Event		Gold		Silver		Bronze	
– 55 kg	Snatch	Lại Gia Thành (VIE)	116 kg	Seyitjan Mirzayev (TKM)	106 kg	Surahmat Wijoyo (INA)	105 kg
– 55 kg	Clean & Jerk	Lại Gia Thành (VIE)	145 kg	Surahmat Wijoyo (INA)	140 kg	Seyitjan Mirzayev (TKM)	125 kg
– 55 kg	Total	Lại Gia Thành (VIE)	261 kg	Surahmat Wijoyo (INA)	245 kg	Seyitjan Mirzayev (TKM)	231 kg
– 61 kg	Snatch	Li Fabin (CHN)	141 kg	Eko Yuli Irawan (INA)	136 kg	Thạch Kim Tuấn (VIE)	135 kg
– 61 kg	Clean & Jerk	Om Yun-chol (PRK)	161 kg	Eko Yuli Irawan (INA)	161 kg	Thạch Kim Tuấn (VIE)	160 kg
– 61 kg	Total	Eko Yuli Irawan (INA)	297 kg	Thạch Kim Tuấn (VIE)	295 kg	Hao Wang (CHN)	286 kg
– 67 kg	Snatch	Huang Minhao (CHN)	148 kg	Pak Jong-ju (PRK)	141 kg	Deni (INA)	135 kg
– 67 kg	Clean & Jerk	Pak Jong-ju (PRK)	177 kg	Deni (INA)	170 kg	Huang Minhao (CHN)	166 kg
– 67 kg	Total	Pak Jong-ju (PRK)	318 kg	Huang Minhao (CHN)	314 kg	Deni (INA)	305 kg
– 73 kg	Snatch	Wei Yinting (CHN)	162 kg	O Kang-chol (PRK)	152 kg	Yuan Chengfei (CHN)	151 kg
– 73 kg	Clean & Jerk	Wei Yinting (CHN)	189 kg	Yuan Chengfei (CHN)	188 kg	O Kang-chol (PRK)	186 kg
– 73 kg	Total	Wei Yinting (CHN)	351 kg	Yuan Chengfei (CHN)	339 kg	O Kang-chol (PRK)	338 kg
– 81 kg	Snatch	Li Dayin (CHN)	171 kg	Jiang Bin (CHN)	155 kg	Antonino Pizzolato (ITA)	153 kg
– 81 kg	Clean & Jerk	Li Dayin (CHN)	204 kg	Choe Jon-wi (PRK)	197 kg	Antonino Pizzolato (ITA)	196 kg
– 81 kg	Total	Li Dayin (CHN)	375 kg WR	Choe Jon-wi (PRK)	350 kg	Antonino Pizzolato (ITA)	349 kg
– 89 kg	Snatch	Yu Dong-ju (KOR)	160 kg				
– 89 kg	Clean & Jerk	Yu Dong-ju (KOR)	200 kg				
– 89 kg	Total	Yu Dong-ju (KOR)	360 kg				
– 96 kg	Snatch	Egor Klimonov (RUS)	165 kg	Tian Fuxuan (CHN)	161 kg	Toshiki Yamamoto (JPN)	150 kg
– 96 kg	Clean & Jerk	Egor Klimonov (RUS)	211 kg	Tian Fuxuan (CHN)	205 kg	Toshiki Yamamoto (JPN)	201 kg
– 96 kg	Total	Egor Klimonov (RUS)	376 kg	Tian Fuxuan (CHN)	366 kg	Toshiki Yamamoto (JPN)	351 kg
– 102 kg	Snatch						
– 102 kg	Clean & Jerk						
– 102 kg	Total						
– 109 kg	Snatch	Yang Zhe (CHN)	193 kg	Rodion Bochkov (RUS)	181 kg	Ryunosuke Mochida (JPN)	155 kg
– 109 kg	Clean & Jerk	Yang Zhe (CHN)	215 kg	Ryunosuke Mochida (JPN)	210 kg	Rodion Bochkov (RUS)	200 kg
– 109 kg	Total	Yang Zhe (CHN)	408 kg	Rodion Bochkov (RUS)	381 kg	Ryunosuke Mochida (JPN)	365 kg
+ 109 kg	Snatch	Ai Yunan (CHN)	183 kg	Ham Sang-il (KOR)	177 kg	Hsieh Yun-ting (TPE)	175 kg
+ 109 kg	Clean & Jerk	Ai Yunan (CHN)	230 kg	Ham Sang-il (KOR)	210 kg	Raul Manriquez (MEX)	202 kg
+ 109 kg	Total	Ai Yunan (CHN)	413 kg	Ham Sang-il (KOR)	387 kg	Hsieh Yun-ting (TPE)	357 kg

=== Women ===
Event		Gold		Silver		Bronze	
– 45 kg	Snatch	Khổng Mỹ Phượng (VIE)	72 kg	Vương Thị Huyền (VIE)	72 kg	Maria Navarro (NCA)	58 kg
– 45 kg	Clean & Jerk	Vương Thị Huyền (VIE)	98 kg	Khổng Mỹ Phượng (VIE)	85 kg	Maria Navarro (NCA)	70 kg
– 45 kg	Total	Vương Thị Huyền (VIE)	170 kg	Khổng Mỹ Phượng (VIE)	157 kg	Maria Navarro (NCA)	128 kg
– 49 kg	Snatch	Hou Zhihui (CHN)	94 kg WR	Ri Song-gum (PRK)	84 kg	Beatriz Pirón (DOM)	78 kg
– 49 kg	Clean & Jerk	Hou Zhihui (CHN)	116 kg	Ri Song-gum (PRK)	109 kg	Kanae Yagi (JPN)	102 kg
– 49 kg	Total	Hou Zhihui (CHN)	210 kg WR	Ri Song-gum (PRK)	193 kg	Beatriz Pirón (DOM)	176 kg
– 55 kg	Snatch	Li Yajun (CHN)	96 kg	Liao Qiuyun (CHN)	96 kg		
– 55 kg	Clean & Jerk	Liao Qiuyun (CHN)	125 kg	Li Yajun (CHN)	119 kg		
– 55 kg	Total	Liao Qiuyun (CHN)	221 kg	Li Yajun (CHN)	219 kg		
– 59 kg	Snatch	Choe Hyo-sim (PRK)	99 kg	Chen Guiming (CHN)	98 kg	Acchedya Jagaddhita (INA)	98 kg
– 59 kg	Clean & Jerk	Chen Guiming (CHN)	136 kg WR	Choe Hyo-sim (PRK)	130 kg	Acchedya Jagaddhita (INA)	117 kg
– 59 kg	Total	Chen Guiming (CHN)	234 kg	Choe Hyo-sim (PRK)	229 kg	Acchedya Jagaddhita (INA)	215 kg
– 64 kg	Snatch	Deng Wei (CHN)	113 kg WR	Kim Hyo-sim (PRK)	106 kg	Rim Un-sim (PRK)	105 kg
– 64 kg	Clean & Jerk	Deng Wei (CHN)	141 kg WR	Rim Un-sim (PRK)	130 kg	Kim Hyo-sim (PRK)	126 kg
– 64 kg	Total	Deng Wei (CHN)	254 kg WR	Rim Un-sim (PRK)	235 kg	Kim Hyo-sim (PRK)	232 kg
– 71 kg	Snatch	Jennifer Cantú (MEX)	90 kg				
– 71 kg	Clean & Jerk	Jennifer Cantú (MEX)	115 kg				
– 71 kg	Total	Jennifer Cantú (MEX)	205 kg				
– 76 kg	Snatch	Wang Zhouyu (CHN)	120 kg	Zhang Wangli (CHN)	118 kg	Rim Jong-sim (PRK)	117 kg
– 76 kg	Clean & Jerk	Zhang Wangli (CHN)	156 kg WR	Rim Jong-sim (PRK)	150 kg	Wang Zhouyu (CHN)	140 kg
– 76 kg	Total	Zhang Wangli (CHN)	274 kg WR	Rim Jong-sim (PRK)	267 kg	Wang Zhouyu (CHN)	260 kg
– 81 kg	Snatch	Jessie Bradley (USA)	96 kg				
– 81 kg	Clean & Jerk	Jessie Bradley (USA)	126 kg				
– 81 kg	Total	Jessie Bradley (USA)	222 kg				
– 87 kg	Snatch	Ao Hui (CHN)	115 kg	Kim Un-ju (PRK)	112 kg	Juliana Riotto (USA)	105 kg
– 87 kg	Clean & Jerk	Kim Un-ju (PRK)	154 kg	Ao Hui (CHN)	150 kg	Crismery Santana (DOM)	136 kg
– 87 kg	Total	Kim Un-ju (PRK)	266 kg	Ao Hui (CHN)	265 kg	Juliana Riotto (USA)	234 kg
+ 87 kg	Snatch	Tatiana Kashirina (RUS)	145 kg	Li Wenwen (CHN)	142 kg	Meng Suping (CHN)	140 kg
+ 87 kg	Clean & Jerk	Meng Suping (CHN)	185 kg	Li Wenwen (CHN)	182 kg	Tatiana Kashirina (RUS)	178 kg
+ 87 kg	Total	Meng Suping (CHN)	325 kg	Li Wenwen (CHN)	324 kg	Tatiana Kashirina (RUS)	323 kg
