= 2019 in weightlifting =

This article lists the main weightlifting events and their results for 2019.

== World weightlifting championships and cups ==
- February 22 – 27: 2019 IWF World Cup #1 in Fuzhou
  - China won both the gold and overall medal tallies.
- March 8 – 15: 2019 Youth World Weightlifting Championships in (United States) Las Vegas
  - Kazakhstan won the gold medal tally. Turkey and Uzbekistan won 6 overall medals each.
- June 1 – 8: 2019 Junior World Weightlifting Championships in (Fiji) Suva
  - China won the gold medal tally. Turkey won the overall medal tally.
  - Team winners: Iran (m) / The United States (f)
- September 18 – 27: 2019 World Weightlifting Championships in (Thailand) Pattaya
  - China won both the gold and overall medal tallies.
- December 13 – 17: 2019 IWF World Cup #2 in (China) Tianjin

== Continental and regional weightlifting championships ==
- April 6 – 13: 2019 European Weightlifting Championships in (Georgia (country)) Batumi
  - Russia and Belarus won 3 gold medals each. Russia won the overall medal tally.
- April 18 – 28: 2019 Asian Weightlifting Championships in Ningbo
  - China won both the gold and overall medal tallies.
- April 21 – 28: 2019 Pan American Weightlifting Championships in Guatemala City
  - The United States won both the gold and overall medal tallies.
- April 23 – 30: 2019 African Weightlifting Championships in Cairo
  - Egypt won both the gold and overall medal tallies.
- May 8 – 12: 2019 South American, Ibero-American, & OPEN Senior Championships in Palmira
  - South American: Venezuela won both the gold and overall medal tallies.
  - Ibero-American: Venezuela won both the gold and overall medal tallies.
  - OPEN Senior: Colombia won both the gold and overall medal tallies.
- June 23 – 30: 2019 Pan American Junior Weightlifting Championships in (Cuba) Havana
  - Colombia won both the gold and overall medal tallies.
- July 9 – 14: 2019 Oceania & Commonwealth Weightlifting Championships, and Part of the 2019 Pacific Games in Apia
  - 2019 Oceania Senior & Pacific Games: Samoa and Australia won 4 gold medals each. Samoa won the overall medal tally.
  - 2019 Oceania Junior: Samoa won the gold medal tally. Samoa and Nauru won 11 overall medals each.
  - 2019 Oceania Youth: Nauru won both the gold and overall medal tallies.
  - 2019 Commonwealth Senior: India won both the gold and overall medal tallies.
  - 2019 Commonwealth Junior: India and Samoa won 6 gold medals each. India won the overall medal tally.
  - 2019 Commonwealth Youth: Nauru and India won 6 gold medals each. Nauru and Australia won 12 overall medals each.
- August 24 – 29: 2019 Pan American Youth Weightlifting Championships in (Ecuador) Guayaquil
- September 6 – 12: 2019 African Junior & Youth Weightlifting Championships in (Uganda) Kampala
  - Junior: Algeria won both the gold and overall medal tallies.
  - Youth: Algeria won both the gold and overall medal tallies.
- October 12 & 13: 2019 Nordic Weightlifting Championships in (Norway) Vigrestad
- October 19 – 27: 2019 European Junior & U23 Weightlifting Championships in (Romania) Bucharest
- October 19 – 27: 2019 Asian Junior & Youth Weightlifting Championships in (North Korea) Pyongyang
- November 20 – 29: 2019 Arabic Weightlifting Championships in (Tunisia) Tunis
- December 1 – 8: 2019 South American, Ibero-American, & CSLP Junior & Youth Weightlifting Championships in (Argentina) Buenos Aires
- December 4 – 12: 2019 European Youth Weightlifting Championships in (Israel) Eilat

== Other weightlifting events ==
- January 25 – 27: Nauru Independence Day International Tournament in Nauru
  - Nauru won both the gold and overall medal tallies.
- June 7 – 9: British International Open 2019 in (United Kingdom) Coventry
  - China won the gold medal tally. Great Britain won the overall medals tally.
- July 6 & 7: Japan-China-Korea Friendship Tournament in Tokyo
  - China won both the gold and overall medal tallies.
- July 6 & 7: Ready Steady Tokyo (Tokyo 2020 Test Event) in Japan
  - China won both the gold and overall medal tallies.
- November 8 – 10: 2019 IWF Grand Prix in (Peru) Lima
  - Colombia won both the gold and overall medal tallies.
