= Jhilli Dalabehera =

Indian weightlifter (born 1999)

Personal information
- Nationality: Indian
- Born: 3 February 1999 (age 27) Nayagarh, Odisha, India

Sport
- Country: Indian
- Sport: Weightlifting
- Event(s): –45 and 49 kg
- Club: list
Medal record
Representing India
Women's weightlifting
Asian Championships
Gold medal – first place	2020 Tashkent	–45 kg
Silver medal – second place	2019 Ningbo	–45 kg
Commonwealth Championships
Gold medal – first place	2019 Samoa	–45 kg
Silver medal – second place	2021 Tashkent	–49 kg
Silver medal – second place	2023 Noida	–49 kg
South Asian Games
Gold medal – first place	2019 Kathmandu	–45 kg
IWF Junior Championships
Bronze medal – third place	2018 Tashkent	–48 kg

Jhilli Dalabehera (born 3 February 1999) is an Indian weightlifter from Odisha.

== Career ==
In 2021, she competed at the 2020 Asian Weightlifting Championships held in Tashkent in the 45 kg category. She swept gold medals in all lifts. In 2019 she won a silver medal at 2019 Asian Weightlifting Championships. She won a gold medal in South Asian Games 2019 in the women's 45 kg weight category.

She competed in the women's 49 kg event at the 2021 World Weightlifting Championships held in Tashkent, Uzbekistan. The 2021 Commonwealth Weightlifting Championships were also held at the same time and her total result gave her the silver medal in this event.

In 2023, she won the silver medal in the women's 49 kg category at the 2023 Commonwealth Weightlifting Championships held at Noida.
