= Acchedya Jagaddhita =

Indonesian weightlifter (born 1997)

Personal information
- Born: 12 May 1997 (age 29) Jambi, Indonesia

Sport
- Country: Indonesia
- Sport: Weightlifting
Medal record
Women's weightlifting
Representing Indonesia
IWF World Cup
Bronze medal – third place	2019 Fuzhou	–59 kg
Islamic Solidarity Games
Silver medal – second place	2017 Baku	–58 kg
Asian Indoor and Martial Arts Games
Bronze medal – third place	2017 Ashgabat	–58 kg

Acchedya Jagaddhita (born 12 May 1997) is an Indonesian weightlifter.

She represented Indonesia at the 2014 Summer Youth Olympics in Nanjing, China. She competed in the women's 58 kg event where she finished in 4th place.

At the 2017 Islamic Solidarity Games held in Baku, Azerbaijan, she won the silver medal in the women's 58 kg event. At the 2017 Asian Indoor and Martial Arts Games held in Ashgabat, Turkmenistan, she won the bronze medal in the women's 58 kg event.

In 2018, she represented Indonesia at the Asian Games held in Jakarta, Indonesia in the women's 58 kg event. She finished in 5th place.

In 2019, she tested positive for metandienone and was banned until 2023 by the International Weightlifting Federation.
