= Weightlifting at the 2018 Asian Games – Women's 63 kg =

Women's weightlifting event

Women's 63 kg at the 2018 Asian Games
- Venue: Jakarta International Expo
- Date: 24 August 2018
- Competitors: 7 from 6 nations

Medalists
| gold medal | Kim Hyo-sim | North Korea |
| silver medal | Choe Hyo-sim | North Korea |
| bronze medal | Rattanawan Wamalun | Thailand |

The Women's 63 kilograms event at the 2018 Asian Games took place on 24 August 2018 at the Jakarta International Expo Hall A.

== Schedule ==
All times are Western Indonesia Time (UTC+07:00)

| Date | Time | Event |
|---|---|---|
| Friday, 24 August 2018 | 14:00 | Group A |

== Records ==
Prior to this competition, the existing world, Asian and Games records were as follows.

| World Record | Snatch | Svetlana Tsarukaeva (RUS) | 117 kg | Paris, France | 8 November 2011 |
| World Record | Clean & Jerk | Deng Wei (CHN) | 147 kg | Rio de Janeiro, Brazil | 9 August 2016 |
| World Record | Total | Deng Wei (CHN) | 262 kg | Rio de Janeiro, Brazil | 9 August 2016 |
| Asian Record | Snatch | Pawina Thongsuk (THA) | 116 kg | Doha, Qatar | 12 November 2005 |
| Asian Record | Clean & Jerk | Deng Wei (CHN) | 147 kg | Rio de Janeiro, Brazil | 9 August 2016 |
| Asian Record | Total | Deng Wei (CHN) | 262 kg | Rio de Janeiro, Brazil | 9 August 2016 |
| Games Record | Snatch | Lin Tzu-chi (TPE) | 116 kg | Incheon, South Korea | 23 September 2014 |
| Games Record | Clean & Jerk | Lin Tzu-chi (TPE) | 145 kg | Incheon, South Korea | 23 September 2014 |
| Games Record | Total | Lin Tzu-chi (TPE) | 261 kg | Incheon, South Korea | 23 September 2014 |

== Results ==
Legend

- NM — No mark

| Rank | Athlete | Group | Snatch (kg) | | | | Clean & Jerk (kg) | | | | Total |
| Rank | Athlete | Group | 1 | 2 | 3 | Result | 1 | 2 | 3 | Result | Total |
|---|---|---|---|---|---|---|---|---|---|---|---|
| 1st place, gold medalist(s) | Kim Hyo-sim (PRK) | A | 111 | ~~113~~ | 113 | 113 | 132 | 135 | 137 | 137 | 250 |
| 2nd place, silver medalist(s) | Choe Hyo-sim (PRK) | A | ~~105~~ | ~~105~~ | 105 | 105 | 133 | ~~138~~ | ~~138~~ | 133 | 238 |
| 3rd place, bronze medalist(s) | Rattanawan Wamalun (THA) | A | 95 | 99 | 102 | 102 | ~~123~~ | 123 | ~~133~~ | 123 | 225 |
| 4 | Elreen Ando (PHI) | A | 85 | 90 | ~~93~~ | 90 | 105 | 111 | ~~115~~ | 111 | 201 |
| 5 | Kim Ye-ra (KOR) | A | ~~90~~ | ~~90~~ | 90 | 90 | 110 | ~~114~~ | ~~114~~ | 110 | 200 |
| 6 | Mabia Akhter (BAN) | A | ~~73~~ | 73 | 77 | 77 | 98 | 101 | ~~103~~ | 101 | 178 |
| — | Rakhi Halder (IND) | A | ~~93~~ | ~~93~~ | ~~93~~ | — | — | — | — | — | NM |
