= Weightlifting at the 2018 Summer Youth Olympics – Girls' +63 kg =

Girls' +63kg at the III Summer Youth Olympic Games
- Venue: Parque Polideportivo Roca
- Dates: 13 October
- Competitors: 13 from 13 nations

Medalists
1st place, gold medalist(s)		Dilara Narin	Turkey
2nd place, silver medalist(s)		Dolera Davronova	Uzbekistan
3rd place, bronze medalist(s)		Kanah Andrews-Nahu	New Zealand

These are the results for the girls' +63 kg event at the 2018 Summer Youth Olympics.

== Results ==
Rank	Name	Nation	Body Weight	Snatch (kg)				Clean & Jerk (kg)				Total (kg)
Rank	Name	Nation	Body Weight	1	2	3	Res	1	2	3	Res	Total (kg)
1st place, gold medalist(s)	Dilara Narin	Turkey		~~90~~	~~90~~	92	92	118	121	126	126	218
2nd place, silver medalist(s)	Dolera Davronova	Uzbekistan		~~91~~	~~91~~	92	92	120	125	~~127~~	125	217
3rd place, bronze medalist(s)	Kanah Andrews-Nahu	New Zealand		90	95	~~100~~	95	~~107~~	112	116	116	211
4	Bella Paredes	Ecuador		85	90	~~93~~	90	105	110	113	113	203
5	Irene Blanco	Spain		~~80~~	80	83	83	95	100	103	103	186
6	Gombosürengiin Enerel	Mongolia		~~72~~	72	75	75	100	104	~~108~~	104	179
7	María Maldonado	Guatemala		71	74	76	76	93	~~97~~	~~97~~	93	169
8	Sangiza Bahtyýarowa	Turkmenistan		67	70	~~72~~	70	83	86	~~90~~	86	156
9	Hermana Dermiček	Croatia		65	~~68~~	~~68~~	65	75	78	81	81	146
10	Mai Al-Madani	United Arab Emirates		60	~~65~~	66	66	70	~~75~~	76	76	142
	Liana Gyurjyan	Armenia		88	92	~~94~~	92	~~116~~	~~116~~	~~116~~	—	—
	Lesila Fiapule	Samoa		~~90~~	~~92~~	~~92~~	—	—	—	—	—	DNF
DSQ (1st)	Supatchanin Khamhaeng	Thailand		98	101	104	104	125	129	132	132	236

- Supatchanin Khamhaeng of Thailand originally finished first, but in November 2019, it was announced that she tested positive for a banned substance.
