= Mary Flor Diaz =

Filipino weightlifter (born 1999)

Personal information
- Nationality: Filipino
- Born: 4 May 1999 (age 27) Zamboanga City, Philippines
- Weight: 45 kg (99 lb)

Sport
- Country: Philippines
- Sport: Weightlifting
- Event: 45 kg
- Club: Philippine Air Force Weightlifting Club

Achievements and titles
- Personal bests: Snatch: 71 kg (2022); Clean and jerk: 90 kg (2019); Total: 159 kg (2019)
Medal record
Women's weightlifting
Representing the Philippines
Event	1st	2nd	3rd
Asian Championships	0	1	1
Southeast Asian Games	0	0	1
Total	0	1	2
Asian Championships
Silver medal – second place	2020 Tashkent	–45 kg
Bronze medal – third place	2019 Ningbo	–45 kg
Southeast Asian Games
Bronze medal – third place	2019 Philippines	-45 kg

Mary Flor Diaz (born 4 May 1999) is a Filipino weightlifter competing in the women's 45 kg category.

== Early life ==
Mary Flor Diaz was born on 4 May 1999 in Zamboanga City. At a young age she was introduced to weightlifting through her family, competing in many local and national tournaments such as the Batang Pinoy, where she won in the 2011, 2012, 2014, and 2016 edition.

Her family has history in the sport of weightlifting, being the cousin of weightlifters Hidilyn Diaz, Rosegie Ramos, and Rose Jean Ramos. As well as her coach Allen Jayfrus Diaz, also being related to her.

== Career ==
=== 2016–2018 ===
As a youth athlete, Diaz competed in the 2016 Asian Youth Weightlifting Championships, lifting 60 kg in the snatch and 77 kg in the clean and jerk for a 137 kg total. She placed fifth.

After a 2-year break from international competition, she competed in the 2018 Asian Junior Weightlifting Championships, lifting 63 kg in the snatch and 81 kg in the clean and jerk. She placed eighth.

=== 2019–2020 ===
Diaz participated in her first Asian Championships, the 2019 Asian Weightlifting Championships held in Ningbo, China. She placed fourth in the snatch lifting 69 kg, then clean and jerking 89 kilograms for a new national record, as well as getting a bronze in both the clean & jerk and total. A few months later, she was selected to compete at the 2019 World Weightlifting Championships, her first World Championships, in the women's 45 kg category. She lifted 70 kg in the snatch, and 86 kg in the clean and jerk. She placed seventh. Then another few months later at the 2019 SEA Games, her first SEA Games, in the same category. She lifted 70 kg in the snatch and clean and jerked 89 kilograms. She earned a bronze medal.

She then went up a weightclass at the 2019 IWF Shengxin World Cup, lifting 66 kg in the snatch and 90 kg in the clean and jerk for a personal best. She placed fifth. At the Roma 2020 Weightlifting World Cup, she lifted 65 kg in the snatch and clean and jerked 83 kg. She placed ninth.

=== 2021–2022 ===
After a one-year absence she competed in the 2020 Asian Weightlifting Championships, where she went down a weightclass. She lifted 60 kg in the snatch and clean and jerked 75 kg. She earned silver in all three lifts.

After a few months, she competed in the 2021 World Weightlifting Championships. She failed all snatch attempts and lifted 80 kg for the clean and jerk. She did not place.

The following year, she competed in the 2021 SEA Games, held in the following year. She snatched 71 kg and clean and jerked 87 kg. She placed 4th.

== Major results ==
Year	Venue	Weight	Snatch (kg)				Clean & Jerk (kg)				Total	Rank
Year	Venue	Weight	1	2	3	Rank	1	2	3	Rank	Total	Rank
World Championships
2019	Pattaya, Thailand	45 kg	67	70	~~72~~	8	~~86~~	86	~~91~~	8	156	7
2021	Tashkent, Uzbekistan	45 kg	~~65~~	~~65~~	~~65~~	—	77	80	~~83~~	9	—	—
Asian Championships
2019	Ningbo, China	45 kg	65	69	~~72~~	4	83	86	89	3rd place, bronze medalist(s)	158	3rd place, bronze medalist(s)
2021	Tashkent, Uzbekistan	45 kg	60	~~65~~	~~66~~	2nd place, silver medalist(s)	75	~~80~~	—	2nd place, silver medalist(s)	135	2nd place, silver medalist(s)
IWF World Cup
2019	Tianjin, China	49 kg	~~63~~	63	66	5	80	85	90	5	156	5
2020	Rome, Italy	49 kg	62	65	~~67~~	10	83	~~86~~	~~86~~	9	148	9
