= Hsieh Yun-ting =

Taiwanese weightlifter (born 1999)

Hsieh Yun-ting 謝昀庭
Personal information
- Citizenship: Chinese Taipei
- Born: 8 August 1999 (age 25)

Sport
- Country: Chinese Taipei
- Sport: Weightlifting
- Weight class: +109 kg

Hsieh Yun-ting or Frank Hsieh (Traditional Chinese: 謝昀庭, born 8 August 1999) is a Taiwanese weightlifter. He represented Chinese Taipei at the 2020 Summer Olympics in Tokyo, Japan.
