= 2021 World Weightlifting Championships – Men's 89 kg =

Weightlifting Championship

The men's 89 kilograms competition at the 2021 World Weightlifting Championships was held on 12 and 13 December 2021.

== Schedule ==
Date	Time	Event
12 December 2021	08:30	Group C
13 December 2021	10:30	Group B
13 December 2021	16:00	Group A

== Medalists ==
Event	Gold		Silver		Bronze	
Snatch	Andranik Karapetyan (ARM)	175 kg	Revaz Davitadze (GEO)	171 kg	Yu Dong-ju (KOR)	167 kg
Clean & Jerk	Artem Okulov (RWF)	205 kg	Sarvarbek Zafarjonov (UZB)	205 kg	Yu Dong-ju (KOR)	204 kg
Total	Yu Dong-ju (KOR)	371 kg	Sarvarbek Zafarjonov (UZB)	371 kg	Revaz Davitadze (GEO)	370 kg

== Records ==
Prior to this competition, the existing world records were as follows.

World Record	Snatch	World Standard	179 kg	—	1 November 2018
World Record	Clean & Jerk	World Standard	216 kg	—	1 November 2018
World Record	Total	World Standard	387 kg	—	1 November 2018

== Results ==
Rank	Athlete	Group	Snatch (kg)				Clean & Jerk (kg)				Total
Rank	Athlete	Group	1	2	3	Rank	1	2	3	Rank	Total
1st place, gold medalist(s)	Yu Dong-ju (KOR)	A	160	165	167	3rd place, bronze medalist(s)	200	204	~~208~~	3rd place, bronze medalist(s)	371
2nd place, silver medalist(s)	Sarvarbek Zafarjonov (UZB)	A	162	166	~~169~~	4	196	202	205	2nd place, silver medalist(s)	371
3rd place, bronze medalist(s)	Revaz Davitadze (GEO)	A	165	168	171	2nd place, silver medalist(s)	195	199	~~203~~	7	370
4	Karim Abokahla (EGY)	A	~~165~~	~~165~~	165	5	200	~~207~~	~~207~~	6	365
5	Roman Chepik (RWF)	A	162	~~167~~	~~169~~	8	195	201	~~206~~	4	363
6	Artem Okulov (RWF)	A	~~153~~	153	158	14	200	205	~~208~~	1st place, gold medalist(s)	363
7	Ruslan Kozhakin (UKR)	A	160	~~164~~	164	6	192	197	~~201~~	8	361
8	Diego Betancur (COL)	A	158	~~162~~	~~162~~	13	200	~~204~~	~~205~~	5	358
9	Jhor Moreno (COL)	A	157	~~162~~	162	9	195	~~200~~	—	11	357
10	Ayoub Mousavi (IRI)	A	~~155~~	155	160	12	~~195~~	195	~~201~~	12	355
11	Rüstem Annaberdiýew (TKM)	B	157	~~162~~	~~163~~	15	190	195	~~203~~	10	352
12	Alex Bellemarre (CAN)	C	154	158	161	10	182	189	~~192~~	14	350
13	Krenar Shoraj (ALB)	B	151	157	~~163~~	16	190	~~194~~	~~194~~	13	347
14	Otakhon Imamov (UZB)	B	146	151	~~154~~	18	186	~~191~~	~~191~~	15	337
15	Braydon Kennedy (CAN)	C	145	150	155	17	~~175~~	175	180	20	335
16	Artūrs Vasiļonoks (LAT)	B	145	~~150~~	150	20	177	185	~~191~~	17	335
17	Armands Mežinskis (LAT)	B	~~145~~	145	150	19	182	~~187~~	~~187~~	19	332
18	Travis Cooper (USA)	C	140	145	~~148~~	22	175	181	185	16	330
19	Phacharamethi Tharaphan (THA)	B	135	—	—	25	195	~~200~~	~~200~~	9	330
20	Muhammad Zul Ilmi (INA)	B	~~143~~	143	~~150~~	24	~~183~~	183	~~187~~	18	326
21	Daniel Godelli (ALB)	B	145	~~150~~	~~151~~	23	175	—	—	21	320
22	Irmantas Kačinskas (LTU)	C	~~141~~	143	146	21	170	~~175~~	~~175~~	22	316
23	Beau Garrett (AUS)	C	125	129	132	26	160	169	~~172~~	23	301
24	Arnór Gauti Haraldsson (ISL)	C	128	~~132~~	~~137~~	27	~~147~~	147	—	24	275
—	Andranik Karapetyan (ARM)	A	167	172	175	1st place, gold medalist(s)	~~196~~	~~196~~	~~196~~	—	—
—	Faris Touairi (ALG)	B	155	162	~~168~~	7	~~190~~	~~190~~	~~191~~	—	—
—	Pavel Khadasevich (BLR)	A	~~160~~	160	~~166~~	11	—	—	—	—	—
