= Yu Dong-ju =

South Korean weightlifter (born 1993)

Personal information
- Full name: Yu Dong-ju
- Born: 19 August 1993 (age 32) Sunchang, South Korea
- Height: 1.75 m (5 ft 9 in)
- Weight: 88.50 kg (195 lb)

Sport
- Country: South Korea
- Sport: Weightlifting
- Club: Jinan County Office
- Coached by: Choi Byung-Chan

Achievements and titles
- Personal bests: Snatch: 167 kg (2021); Clean and jerk: 209 kg (2024); Total: 375 kg (2024)
Medal record
Representing South Korea
World Championships
Gold medal – first place	2021 Tashkent	89 kg
Asian Championships
Gold medal – first place	2013 Astana	85 kg
Gold medal – first place	2019 Ningbo	89 kg
- Updated on 22 August 2024

Yu Dong-ju (Korean: 유동주; born August 19, 1993) is a South Korean male weightlifter, competing in the 85 kg category and representing South Korea at international competitions.

== Career ==
He participated in the men's 85 kg event at the 2015 World Championships and at the 2016 Summer Olympics, finishing in fourteenth position.

In August 2024, Yu Dong-ju competed in the men's 89 kg event at the 2024 Summer Olympics held in Paris, France. He lifted 371 kg in total and placed sixth.

== Major results ==
Year	Venue	Weight	Snatch (kg)				Clean & Jerk (kg)				Total	Rank
Year	Venue	Weight	1	2	3	Rank	1	2	3	Rank	Total	Rank
Olympic Games
2016	Rio de Janeiro, Brazil	85 kg	150	~~157~~	~~157~~	—N/a	190	~~195~~	~~195~~	—N/a	340	13
2021	Tokyo, Japan	96 kg	160	~~165~~	~~167~~	—N/a	200	~~205~~	~~205~~	—N/a	360	8
2024	Paris, France	89 kg	~~163~~	163	168	—N/a	203	~~211~~	~~217~~	—N/a	371	6
World Championships
2015	Houston, United States	85 kg	151	157	~~161~~	15	193	198	~~200~~	9	355	11
2017	Anaheim, United States	85 kg	158	~~162~~	~~163~~	6	~~194~~	194	~~200~~	5	352	4
2019	Pattaya, Thailand	89 kg	157	~~162~~	162	9	200	205	~~209~~	4	367	5
2021	Tashkent, Uzbekistan	89 kg	160	165	167	3rd place, bronze medalist(s)	200	204	~~208~~	3rd place, bronze medalist(s)	371	1st place, gold medalist(s)
2023	Riyadh, Saudi Arabia	89 kg	155	160	~~164~~	13	~~195~~	~~195~~	195	13	355	12
IWF World Cup
2019	Tianjin, China	89 kg	~~160~~	160	~~165~~	1st place, gold medalist(s)	200	~~205~~	205	1st place, gold medalist(s)	365	1st place, gold medalist(s)
2024	Phuket, Thailand	89 kg	163	166	~~168~~	8	200	~~209~~	209	5	375	5
Asian Championships
2013	Astana, Kazakhstan	85 kg	150	155	~~157~~	2nd place, silver medalist(s)	~~185~~	185	~~191~~	1st place, gold medalist(s)	340	1st place, gold medalist(s)
2016	Tashkent, Uzbekistan	85 kg	155	~~161~~	161	3rd place, bronze medalist(s)	192	~~199~~	~~199~~	4	353	4
2017	Ashgabat, Turkmenistan	85 kg	151	156	~~161~~	3rd place, bronze medalist(s)	180	~~191~~	194	3rd place, bronze medalist(s)	350	4
2019	Ningbo, China	89 kg	160	~~165~~	~~167~~	4	198	202	207	1st place, gold medalist(s)	367	1st place, gold medalist(s)
2021	Tashkent, Uzbekistan	89 kg	160	~~165~~	~~165~~	5	200	~~205~~	207	1st place, gold medalist(s)	367	4
2023	Jinju, South Korea	89 kg	155	161	~~166~~	6	195	201	~~206~~	5	362	5
2024	Tashkent, Uzbekistan	89 kg	145	~~155~~	~~160~~	10	190	195	201	1st place, gold medalist(s)	346	6
