= Nguyễn Thị Vân =

Vietnamese activist

Nguyễn Thị Vân (Vietnamese: Nguyễn Thị Vân, [ŋwiən˦ˀ˥ tʰi˧˨ʔ van˧˧], born 1985/86), sometimes referred to as Van Thi Nguyen, is a Vietnamese social entrepreneur and disability rights activist.

== Early life ==
Born in a village 300 kilometres (190 mi) from Hanoi, Vân has spinal muscular atrophy, as did her brother Cong Hung Nguyen. She worried about their future, seeing the many disabled beggars in Vietnam, and became depressed, withdrawing from school and attempting suicide.

== Career ==
Vân and Hung founded the Will to Live Center in 2003, which provides training for disabled people. Hung died, age 31, and Vân continued to run it alone.

Vân also runs Imagtor, a social enterprise which offers photo, video and IT solutions, employing disabled Vietnamese.

In 2019, she was listed among the BBC's 100 Women, a list of 100 inspiring and influential women. She was also listed by Forbes Vietnam on a list of influential Vietnamese women in 2019.
