= Vương Thị Huyền =

Vietnamese weightlifter (born 1992)

Personal information
- Born: 22 June 1992 (age 34) Hanoi, Vietnam

Sport
- Country: Vietnam
- Sport: Weightlifting
Medal record
Women's weightlifting
Representing Vietnam
Southeast Asian Games
Gold medal – first place	2019 Philippines	45 kg
Asian Indoor and Martial Arts Games
Bronze medal – third place	2017 Ashgabat	48 kg
IWF World Cup
Gold medal – first place	2019 Fuzhou	45 kg
Bronze medal – third place	2020 Rome	49 kg

Vương Thị Huyền (born 22 June 1992) is a Vietnamese weightlifter.

In 2018, she competed in the women's 48 kg event at the Asian Games held in Jakarta, Indonesia. She finished in 4th place.

In 2020, she won the bronze medal in the women's 49 kg event at the Roma 2020 World Cup in Rome, Italy. In 2021, she finished in 5th place in the women's 49 kg event at the 2020 Asian Weightlifting Championships held in Tashkent, Uzbekistan.
