= Dolera Davronova =

Uzbekistani weightlifter (born 2001)

Personal information
- Born: 3 November 2001 (age 24)

Sport
- Country: Uzbekistan
- Sport: Weightlifting
Medal record
Women's weightlifting
Representing Uzbekistan
Summer Youth Olympics
Silver medal – second place	2018 Buenos Aires	+63 kg
Asian Weightlifting Championships
Bronze medal – third place	2017 Ashgabat	90 kg
Asian Indoor and Martial Arts Games
Bronze medal – third place	2017 Ashgabat	90 kg
Junior World Weightlifting Championships
Gold medal – first place	2018 Tashkent	90 kg

Dolera Davronova (born 3 November 2001) is an Uzbekistani weightlifter. She won the silver medal in the girls' +63 kg event at the 2018 Summer Youth Olympics held in Buenos Aires, Argentina. At the time, she won the bronze medal but Supatchanin Khamhaeng of Thailand was stripped of her gold medal after testing positive for a banned substance.

At the 2017 Asian Weightlifting Championships held in Ashgabat, Turkmenistan, she won the bronze medal in the women's 90 kg event. She also won the bronze medal in the women's 90 kg event at the 2017 Asian Indoor and Martial Arts Games held in Ashgabat, Turkmenistan. In 2018, she won the gold medal in the women's 90 kg event at the Junior World Weightlifting Championships held in Tashkent, Uzbekistan.

In April 2021, she competed at the 2020 Asian Weightlifting Championships held in Tashkent, Uzbekistan.
