= Weightlifting Federation of the Republic of Uzbekistan =

Sports governing body in Uzbekistan

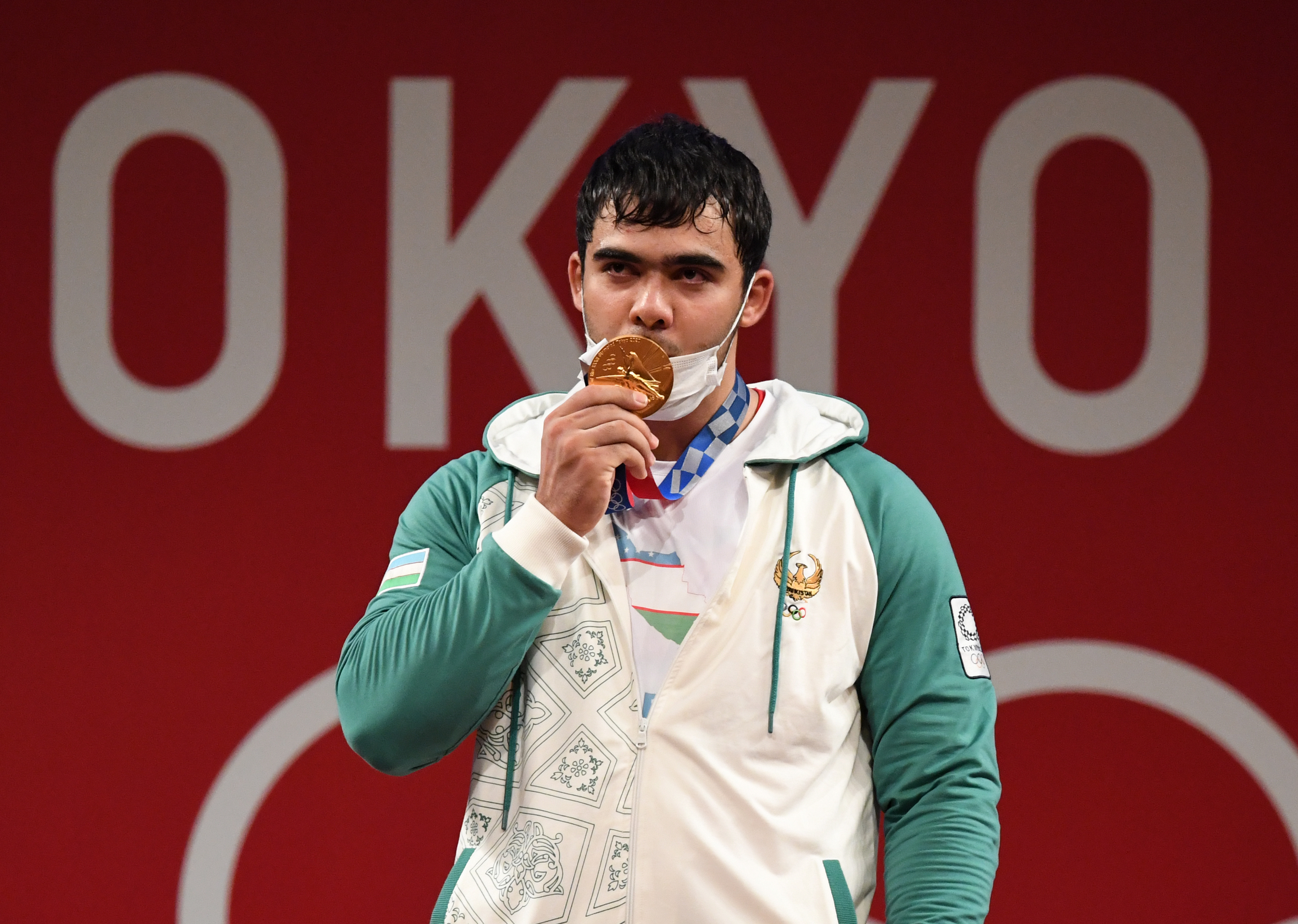
Akbar Djuraev – Uzbek weightlifter, Olympic and World Champion. Gold medalist of the men's 109 kg event at the 2020 Summer Olympics held in Tokyo, Japan. He also won the gold medal in the men's 109 kg event at the 2021 World Weightlifting Championships held in Tashkent, Uzbekistan.

Uzbekistan Weightlifting Federation, otherwise known as UWF, is the national governing body overseeing the sport of weightlifting in the Uzbekistan. UWF is a member of the National Olympic Committee of the Republic of Uzbekistan, responsible for conducting weightlifting programs throughout the country, and a member of the International Weightlifting Federation (IWF). Top competitors are selected by UWF to compete in major international events such as the Olympic Games, World Championships, Asian Championships and Asian Games.

There are 14 regional weightlifting branches of federation. Each of them promotes weightlifting programs and develops athletes in its region by holding local competitions and other programs.

Uzbekistan Weightlifting Federation organizes 4 National Championships and 4 National Cups in 4 age groups (Senior, Junior U20, Youth U17 and U15), giving athletes a chance to evaluate their competition nationwide. Top competitors are selected from the various National Championships and National Cups to compete in major international events.
