= Sarvarbek Zafarjonov =

Uzbekistani weightlifter (born 2000)

Personal information
- Born: 26 July 2000 (age 25)

Sport
- Country: Uzbekistan
- Sport: Weightlifting
- Weight class: 89 kg
Medal record
Men's weightlifting
Representing Uzbekistan
World Championships
Silver medal – second place	2021 Tashkent	89 kg
Asian Championships
Silver medal – second place	2024 Tashkent	89 kg
Bronze medal – third place	2020 Tashkent	89 kg
Islamic Solidarity Games
Gold medal – first place	2021 Konya	89 kg S
Gold medal – first place	2021 Konya	89 kg C
Gold medal – first place	2021 Konya	89 kg T
Gold medal – first place	2025 Riyadh	88 kg C
Gold medal – first place	2025 Riyadh	88 kg T
Silver medal – second place	2025 Riyadh	88 kg S

Sarvarbek Zafarjonov (born 26 July 2000) is an Uzbekistani weightlifter. He won the silver medal in the men's 89 kg event at the 2021 World Weightlifting Championships held in Tashkent, Uzbekistan. He won the gold medal in the men's 89 kg event at the 2021 Islamic Solidarity Games held in Konya, Turkey.

In 2019, he won the silver medal in the men's 81 kg Clean & Jerk event at the 6th International Qatar Cup held in Doha, Qatar.
