= Kang Yeoun-hee =

South Korean weightlifter (born 1992)

Personal information
- Born: 15 October 1992 (age 33)

Sport
- Country: South Korea
- Sport: Weightlifting
Medal record
Women's weightlifting
Representing South Korea
Asian Championships
Gold medal – first place	2019 Ningbo	81 kg
Silver medal – second place	2016 Tashkent	75 kg
IWF World Cup
Gold medal – first place	2020 Rome	87 kg

Kang Yeoun-hee (born 15 October 1992) is a South Korean weightlifter. In 2019, at the Asian Weightlifting Championships held in Ningbo, China, she won the gold medal in the women's 81 kg event.

In 2020, she won the gold medal in the women's 87 kg event at the Roma 2020 World Cup in Rome, Italy.

She represented South Korea at the 2020 Summer Olympics in Tokyo, Japan. She finished in 9th place in the women's 87 kg event.
