= Ham Eun-ji =

South Korean weightlifter (born 1997)

Ham Eun-Ji
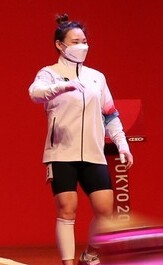
- Ham at the 2020 Olympics in Tokyo

Personal information
- Full name: Ham Eun-Ji
- Nickname: Hamzzi
- Nationality: South Korean
- Born: 23 July 1997 (age 29) South Korea
- Years active: 2010–present
- Weight: 55 kg (121 lb)

Sport
- Country: KOR
- Sport: Weightlifting
- Weight class: 55kg
- Club: (South Korea) Wonju City Hall
- Team: National team
Medal record
Women's weightlifting
Representing South Korea

Ham Eun-ji (born July 23, 1997) is a South Korean professional weightlifter who earned a spot at the 2020 Summer Olympics in the 55 kg category.

== Career ==
Ham was introduced to weightlifting by her father at an early age, beginning weightlifting in grade 5.

Ham competed in the 2020 Summer Olympics in the 55 kg competition. Prior to the Olympics, she placed 1st in the Olympic test event.

== Awards ==
- 2020 National Business Weightlifting Championships - Best Weightlifter
