= Dilanka Isuru Kumara =

Sri Lankan weightlifter

Yodage Dilanka Isuru Kumara
Personal information
- Nickname: Tela
- Citizenship: Sri Lankan
- Born: 21 April 1996 (age 30)
- Home town: Kurunegala
- Education: Sir John Kothalawala Collage
- Website: https://kurunegalaweightliftingclub.rf.gd/

Sport
- Country: Sri Lanka
- Sport: Weightlifting
- 55KG: 55 kg
- Club: Kurunegala Weightlifting Club
- Coached by: Mr.Rukshan Gunathilaka

Achievements and titles
- World finals: Grade " A " World Rank 5th Place 55KG Category
Medal record
Men's Weightlifting
Representing Sri Lanka
Commonwealth Games
Bronze medal – third place	2022 Birmingham	55 kg

Dilanka Isuru Kumara is a Sri Lankan weightlifter. He represented Sri Lanka at the 2019 World Weightlifting Championships, as well as the 2021 Asian Championships.

Kumara has qualified to compete for Sri Lanka at the 2022 Commonwealth Games in Birmingham, England. At the games, Kumara won the bronze medal in the 55 kg event.

Dilanka Isuru won 5th place in World ranking under 55 kg weight category in IWF final championship held in Phucket, Thailand 2024.

He is a member of Kurunegala Weightlifting Club

https://kurunegalaweightliftingclub.rf.gd/

Official Website Of Kurunegala Weightlifting Club - https://kurunegalaweightliftingclub.rf.gd/
