= Kim Hyo-sim =

North Korean weightlifter (born 1994)

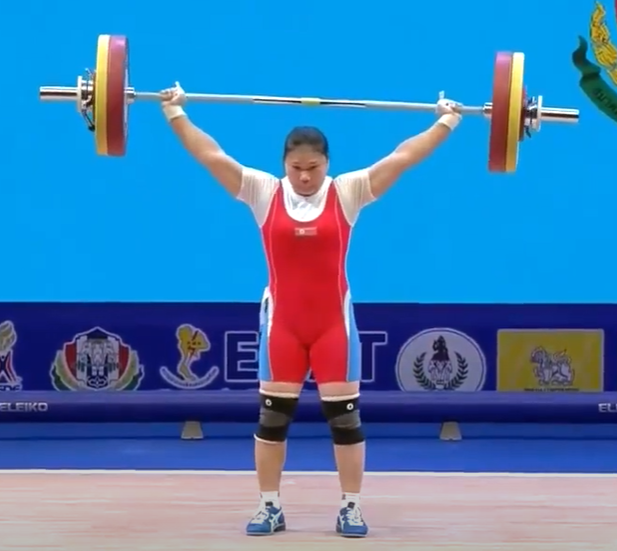
- Kim in 2019

Personal information
- Nationality: North Korean
- Born: 29 March 1994 (age 32)
- Weight: 65.85 kg (145 lb)

Sport
- Country: North Korea
- Sport: Weightlifting
- Event: –71 kg
- Coached by: Kim Myong-ho

Achievements and titles
- Personal bests: Snatch: 114 kg (2019); Clean and jerk: 135 kg (2019); Total: 249 kg (2019)
Medal record
Representing North Korea
World Championships
Bronze medal – third place	2019 Pattaya	–71 kg
Asian Games
Gold medal – first place	2018 Jakarta-Palembang	63 kg

Kim Hyo-sim (born 29 March 1994) is a North Korean weightlifter and Asian Games Champion competing in the 63 kg category until 2018 and 64 kg starting in 2018 after the International Weightlifting Federation reorganized the categories.

== Career ==
She competed at the 2018 Asian Games placing first in every lift, and winning a gold medal in the 63 kg category.
