= Hayato Hirai =

Japanese weightlifter

Personal information
- Citizenship: Japanese
- Born: 8 August 1994 (age 30)

Sport
- Country: Japan
- Sport: Weightlifting
- Weight class: 61 kg

Hayato Hirai is a Japanese weightlifter. He represented Japan at the 2019 World Weightlifting Championships.
