= Raushan Meshitkhanova =

Kazakh weightlifter

Personal information
- Nationality: Kazakhstan
- Born: 24 November 1995 (age 30)
- Weight: 79.79 kg (175.9 lb)

Sport
- Country: Kazakhstan
- Sport: Weightlifting
- Weight class: 81 kg

Raushan Meshitkhanova born 24 November 1995 is a Kazakh weightlifter, most recently competing in the 81 kg division at the 2018 World Weightlifting Championships.

== Career ==
She won the silver medal in the snatch at the 2018 World Weightlifting Championships in the 81 kg division.

== Major results ==
Year	Venue	Weight	Snatch (kg)				Clean & Jerk (kg)				Total	Rank
Year	Venue	Weight	1	2	3	Rank	1	2	3	Rank	Total	Rank
Representing Kazakhstan
World Championships
2018	Ashgabat, Turkmenistan	81 kg	100	105	108	2nd place, silver medalist(s)	~~115~~	115	~~120~~	16	223	9
