= Chen Guiming =

Chinese weightlifter (born 1994)

Personal information
- Nationality: Chinese
- Born: 3 January 1994 (age 32)
- Height: 1.57 m (5 ft 2 in)
- Weight: 58.85 kg (130 lb)

Sport
- Country: China
- Sport: Weightlifting
- Event: –59 kg
Medal record
World Championships
Silver medal – second place	2018 Ashgabat	–59 kg
Bronze medal – third place	2019 Pattaya	–59 kg

Chen Guiming (born 3 January 1994) is a Chinese weightlifter.

She participated at the 2018 World Weightlifting Championships, winning a medal.
