= List of Kazakhstani records in Olympic weightlifting =

The following are the records of Kazakhstan in Olympic weightlifting. Records are maintained in each weight class for the snatch lift, clean and jerk lift, and the total for both lifts by the Weightlifting Federation of the Republic of Kazakhstan (WFRK).

== Current records ==
=== Men ===
Event	Record	Athlete	Date	Meet	Place	Ref
60 kg
Snatch	127 kg	Otepbergen Aliyev	24 September 2026	Asian Games	Nagoya, Japan	
Clean & Jerk	153 kg	Otepbergen Aliyev	24 September 2026	Asian Games	Nagoya, Japan	
Total	280 kg	Otepbergen Aliyev	24 September 2026	Asian Games	Nagoya, Japan	
65 kg
Snatch	131 kg	Beibarys Yerseit	3 May 2026	World Junior Championships	Ismailia, Egypt	
Clean & Jerk						
Total						
70 kg
Snatch						
Clean & Jerk						
Total						
75 kg
Snatch	135 kg	Beksultan Aitbay	26 September 2026	Asian Games	Nagoya, Japan	
Clean & Jerk	177 kg	Beksultan Aitbay	26 September 2026	Asian Games	Nagoya, Japan	
Total	312 kg	Beksultan Aitbay	26 September 2026	Asian Games	Nagoya, Japan	
85 kg
Snatch	173 kg	Alexey Churkin	28 September 2026	Asian Games	Nagoya, Japan	
Clean & Jerk	205 kg	Alexey Churkin	28 September 2026	Asian Games	Nagoya, Japan	
Total	378 kg	Alexey Churkin	28 September 2026	Asian Games	Nagoya, Japan	
95 kg
Snatch	182 kg	Nurgissa Adiletuly	4 November 2026	World Championships	Ningbo, China	
Clean & Jerk	217 kg	Nurgissa Adiletuly	28 September 2026	Asian Games	Nagoya, Japan	
Total	399 kg	Nurgissa Adiletuly	4 November 2026	World Championships	Ningbo, China	
110 kg
Snatch	161 kg	Artyom Antropov	12 November 2025	Islamic Solidarity Games	Riyadh, Saudi Arabia	
Clean & Jerk	223 kg	Artyom Antropov	12 November 2025	Islamic Solidarity Games	Riyadh, Saudi Arabia	
Total	384 kg	Artyom Antropov	12 November 2025	Islamic Solidarity Games	Riyadh, Saudi Arabia	
+110 kg
Snatch						
Clean & Jerk						
Total						

=== Women ===
Event	Record	Athlete	Date	Meet	Place	Ref
48 kg
Snatch						
Clean & Jerk						
Total						
53 kg
Snatch						
Clean & Jerk						
Total						
58 kg
Snatch						
Clean & Jerk						
Total						
63 kg
Snatch	81 kg	Darya Balabayuk	10 November 2025	Islamic Solidarity Games	Riyadh, Saudi Arabia	
Clean & Jerk	104 kg	Darya Balabayuk	10 November 2025	Islamic Solidarity Games	Riyadh, Saudi Arabia	
Total	185 kg	Darya Balabayuk	10 November 2025	Islamic Solidarity Games	Riyadh, Saudi Arabia	
69 kg
Snatch	96 kg	Aray Nurlybekova	10 November 2025	Islamic Solidarity Games	Riyadh, Saudi Arabia	
Clean & Jerk	115 kg	Aray Nurlybekova	10 November 2025	Islamic Solidarity Games	Riyadh, Saudi Arabia	
Total	211 kg	Aray Nurlybekova	10 November 2025	Islamic Solidarity Games	Riyadh, Saudi Arabia	
77 kg
Snatch	93 kg	Ayanat Zhumagali	11 November 2025	Islamic Solidarity Games	Riyadh, Saudi Arabia	
Clean & Jerk	128 kg	Ayanat Zhumagali	11 November 2025	Islamic Solidarity Games	Riyadh, Saudi Arabia	
Total	221 kg	Ayanat Zhumagali	11 November 2025	Islamic Solidarity Games	Riyadh, Saudi Arabia	
86 kg
Snatch	90 kg	Aruzhan Dauletova	11 November 2025	Islamic Solidarity Games	Riyadh, Saudi Arabia	
Clean & Jerk	110 kg	Aruzhan Dauletova	11 November 2025	Islamic Solidarity Games	Riyadh, Saudi Arabia	
Total	200 kg	Aruzhan Dauletova	11 November 2025	Islamic Solidarity Games	Riyadh, Saudi Arabia	
+86 kg
Snatch	117 kg	Lyubov Kovalchuk	12 November 2025	Islamic Solidarity Games	Riyadh, Saudi Arabia	
Clean & Jerk	150 kg	Lyubov Kovalchuk	12 November 2025	Islamic Solidarity Games	Riyadh, Saudi Arabia	
Total	267 kg	Lyubov Kovalchuk	12 November 2025	Islamic Solidarity Games	Riyadh, Saudi Arabia	

== Historical records ==
=== Men (2018–2025) ===
Event	Record	Athlete	Date	Meet	Place	Ref
55 kg
Snatch	118 kg	Igor Son	August 2019	Spartakiad	Taldykorgan, Kazakhstan	
Clean & Jerk	144 kg	Arli Chontey	6 October 2022	Asian Championships	Manama, Bahrain	
Total	260 kg	Igor Son	August 2019	Spartakiad	Taldykorgan, Kazakhstan	
61 kg
Snatch	132 kg	Igor Son	18 April 2021	Asian Championships	Tashkent, Uzbekistan	
Clean & Jerk	163 kg	Igor Son	25 July 2021	Olympic Games	Tokyo, Japan	
Total	294 kg	Igor Son	25 July 2021	Olympic Games	Tokyo, Japan	
67 kg
Snatch	140 kg	Anatoliy Savelyev	20 April 2022	Kazakhstani Championships	Kyzylorda, Kazakhstan	
Clean & Jerk	180 kg	Sairamkez Akmolda	7 November 2021	Kazakhstani Championships	Taldykorgan, Kazakhstan	
Total	309 kg	Anatoliy Savelyev	February 2020	Kazakhstani Championships	Kyzylorda, Kazakhstan	
73 kg
Snatch	154 kg	Alexey Churkin	8 May 2023	Asian Championships	Jinju, South Korea	
Clean & Jerk	190 kg	Alexey Churkin	9 December 2022	World Championships	Bogotá, Colombia	
Total	343 kg	Alexey Churkin	9 December 2022	World Championships	Bogotá, Colombia	
81 kg
Snatch	164 kg	Alexey Churkin	10 December 2024	World Championships	Manama, Bahrain	
Clean & Jerk	204 kg	Alexey Churkin	10 December 2024	World Championships	Manama, Bahrain	
Total	368 kg	Alexey Churkin	10 December 2024	World Championships	Manama, Bahrain	
89 kg
Snatch	169 kg	Nurgissa Adiletuly	22 April 2021	Asian Championships	Tashkent, Uzbekistan	
Clean & Jerk	203 kg	Nurgissa Adiletuly	22 April 2021	Asian Championships	Tashkent, Uzbekistan	
Total	372 kg	Nurgissa Adiletuly	22 April 2021	Asian Championships	Tashkent, Uzbekistan	
96 kg
Snatch	174 kg	Nurgissa Adiletuly	12 December 2022	World Championships	Bogotá, Colombia	
Clean & Jerk	221 kg	Artyom Antropov	14 December 2021	World Championships	Tashkent, Uzbekistan	
Total	388 kg	Nurgissa Adiletuly	12 December 2024	World Championships	Manama, Bahrain	
102 kg
Snatch	181 kg	Nurgissa Adiletuly	12 May 2023	Asian Championships	Jinju, South Korea	
Clean & Jerk	230 kg	Artyom Antropov	13 December 2024	World Championships	Manama, Bahrain	
Total	400 kg	Artyom Antropov	13 December 2024	World Championships	Manama, Bahrain	
Total	400 kg	Nurgissa Adiletuly	12 May 2023	Asian Championships	Jinju, South Korea	
109 kg
Snatch	180 kg	Ibragim Bersanov	27 April 2019	Asian Championships	Ningbo, China	
Clean & Jerk	227 kg	Artyom Antropov	12 May 2023	Asian Championships	Jinju, South Korea	
Total	399 kg	Artyom Antropov	12 May 2023	Asian Championships	Jinju, South Korea	
+109 kg
Snatch	180 kg	Selimkhan Abubakarov	28 April 2019	Asian Championships	Ningbo, China	
Clean & Jerk	220 kg	Selimkhan Abubakarov	28 April 2019	Asian Championships	Ningbo, China	
Total	400 kg	Selimkhan Abubakarov	28 April 2019	Asian Championships	Ningbo, China	

=== Women (2018–2025) ===
Event	Record	Athlete	Date	Meet	Place	Ref
45 kg
Snatch	67 kg	Yulia Potasova	February 2020	Kazakhstani Championships	Kyzylorda, Kazakhstan	
Clean & Jerk	80 kg	Yulia Potasova	August 2019	Spartakiad	Taldykorgan, Kazakhstan	
Total	146 kg	Yulia Potasova	February 2020	Kazakhstani Championships	Kyzylorda, Kazakhstan	
49 kg
Snatch	72 kg	Ainur Abdykalykova	1 April 2024	World Cup	Phuket, Thailand	
Clean & Jerk	88 kg	Ainur Abdykalykova	1 April 2024	World Cup	Phuket, Thailand	
Total	160 kg	Ainur Abdykalykova	1 April 2024	World Cup	Phuket, Thailand	
55 kg
Snatch	95 kg	Zulfiya Chinshanlo	9 October 2022	Asian Championships	Manama, Bahrain	
Clean & Jerk	125 kg	Zulfiya Chinshanlo	9 October 2022	Asian Championships	Manama, Bahrain	
Total	220 kg	Zulfiya Chinshanlo	9 October 2022	Asian Championships	Manama, Bahrain	
59 kg
Snatch	95 kg	Zulfiya Chinshanlo	19 April 2022	Kazakhstani Championships	Kyzylorda, Kazakhstan	
Clean & Jerk	128 kg	Zulfiya Chinshanlo	19 April 2022	Kazakhstani Championships	Kyzylorda, Kazakhstan	
Total	223 kg	Zulfiya Chinshanlo	19 April 2022	Kazakhstani Championships	Kyzylorda, Kazakhstan	
64 kg
Snatch	96 kg	Karina Goricheva	2 October 2023	Asian Games	Hangzhou, China	
Clean & Jerk	118 kg	Karina Goricheva	24 April 2019	Asian Championships	Ningbo, China	
Total	213 kg	Karina Goricheva	24 April 2019	Asian Championships	Ningbo, China	
71 kg
Snatch	94 kg	Yekaterina Bykova	25 April 2019	Asian Championships	Ningbo, China	
Clean & Jerk	122 kg	Yekaterina Bykova	21 April 2021	Asian Championships	Tashkent, Uzbekistan	
Total	213 kg	Yekaterina Bykova	21 April 2021	Asian Championships	Tashkent, Uzbekistan	
76 kg
Snatch	100 kg	Aisha Omarova	21 April 2022	Kazakhstani Championships	Kyzylorda, Kazakhstan	
Clean & Jerk	127 kg	Yekaterina Bykova	March 2021	Kazakhstani Championships		
Total	221 kg	Aray Nurlybekova	13 October 2022	Asian Championships	Manama, Bahrain	
81 kg
Snatch	104 kg	Karina Kuzganbayeva	23 April 2021	Asian Championships	Tashkent, Uzbekistan	
Clean & Jerk	128 kg	Olga Pastukhova	March 2021	Kazakhstani Championships		
Total	232 kg	Karina Kuzganbayeva	23 April 2021	Asian Championships	Tashkent, Uzbekistan	
87 kg
Snatch	115 kg	Larisa Kobeleva	27 April 2019	Asian Championships	Ningbo, China	
Clean & Jerk	128 kg	Karina Kuzganbayeva	16 December 2021	World Championships	Tashkent, Uzbekistan	
Total	240 kg	Larisa Kobeleva	27 April 2019	Asian Championships	Ningbo, China	
+87 kg
Snatch	120 kg	Aizada Muptilda	17 December 2021	World Championships	Tashkent, Uzbekistan	
Clean & Jerk	157 kg	Aizada Muptilda	22 April 2022	Kazakhstani Championships	Kyzylorda, Kazakhstan	
Total	277 kg	Aizada Muptilda	16 October 2022	Asian Championships	Manama, Bahrain	
