= 2022 Asian Weightlifting Championships =

International weightlifting competition

- Host city: Manama, Bahrain
- Dates: 6–16 October
- Main venue: Crowne Plaza Hotel

The 2022 Asian Weightlifting Championships was held in Manama, Bahrain from 6 to 16 October 2022. It was the 50th men's and 31st women's championship.

== Medal summary ==
=== Men ===
Event	Gold		Silver		Bronze	
55 kg
Snatch	Lại Gia Thành; Vietnam	120 kg	Mansour Al-Saleem; Saudi Arabia	119 kg	Arli Chontey; Kazakhstan	116 kg
Clean & Jerk	Arli Chontey; Kazakhstan	144 kg	Lại Gia Thành; Vietnam	142 kg	Mansour Al-Saleem; Saudi Arabia	140 kg
Total	Lại Gia Thành; Vietnam	262 kg	Arli Chontey; Kazakhstan	260 kg	Mansour Al-Saleem; Saudi Arabia	259 kg
61 kg
Snatch	Jia Xionghui; China	140 kg	Nguyễn Trần Anh Tuấn; Vietnam	134 kg	Ricko Saputra; Indonesia	133 kg
Clean & Jerk	Nguyễn Trần Anh Tuấn; Vietnam	161 kg	Aniq Kasdan; Malaysia	160 kg	Ricko Saputra; Indonesia	158 kg
Total	Jia Xionghui; China	296 kg	Nguyễn Trần Anh Tuấn; Vietnam	295 kg	Ricko Saputra; Indonesia	291 kg
67 kg
Snatch	Adkhamjon Ergashev; Uzbekistan	138 kg	Mohammad Yasin; Indonesia	137 kg	Anucha Doungsri; Thailand	136 kg
Clean & Jerk	Adkhamjon Ergashev; Uzbekistan	176 kg	Mohammad Yasin; Indonesia	166 kg	Anucha Doungsri; Thailand	165 kg
Total	Adkhamjon Ergashev; Uzbekistan	314 kg	Mohammad Yasin; Indonesia	303 kg	Anucha Doungsri; Thailand	301 kg
73 kg
Snatch	Rizki Juniansyah; Indonesia	152 kg	Xiang Shulin; China	143 kg	Doston Yokubov; Uzbekistan	140 kg
Clean & Jerk	Doston Yokubov; Uzbekistan	182 kg	Xiang Shulin; China	178 kg	Nawaf Al-Mazyadi; Saudi Arabia	170 kg
Total	Doston Yokubov; Uzbekistan	322 kg	Xiang Shulin; China	321 kg	Nawaf Al-Mazyadi; Saudi Arabia	309 kg
81 kg
Snatch	Lu Delin; China	165 kg	Mukhammadkodir Toshtemirov; Uzbekistan	154 kg	Rahmat Erwin Abdullah; Indonesia	151 kg
Clean & Jerk	Rahmat Erwin Abdullah; Indonesia	198 kg	Mukhammadkodir Toshtemirov; Uzbekistan	192 kg	Ogabek Tukhtaev; Uzbekistan	189 kg
Total	Lu Delin; China	353 kg	Rahmat Erwin Abdullah; Indonesia	349 kg	Mukhammadkodir Toshtemirov; Uzbekistan	346 kg
89 kg
Snatch	Emil Moldodosov; Kyrgyzstan	166 kg	Assylzhan Bektay; Kazakhstan	165 kg	Mohammad Zareei; Iran	165 kg
Clean & Jerk	Assylzhan Bektay; Kazakhstan	197 kg	Masoud Chatraei; Iran	196 kg	Emil Moldodosov; Kyrgyzstan	195 kg
Total	Assylzhan Bektay; Kazakhstan	362 kg	Emil Moldodosov; Kyrgyzstan	361 kg	Masoud Chatraei; Iran	358 kg
96 kg
Snatch	Lesman Paredes; Bahrain	182 kg	Chen Po-jen; Chinese Taipei	177 kg	Nurgissa Adiletuly; Kazakhstan	172 kg
Clean & Jerk	Artyom Antropov; Kazakhstan	219 kg	Lesman Paredes; Bahrain	215 kg	Chen Po-jen; Chinese Taipei	206 kg
Total	Lesman Paredes; Bahrain	397 kg	Chen Po-jen; Chinese Taipei	383 kg	Artyom Antropov; Kazakhstan	377 kg
102 kg
Snatch	Sharofiddin Amriddinov; Uzbekistan	172 kg	Fares El-Bakh; Qatar	171 kg	Reza Dehdar; Iran	170 kg
Clean & Jerk	Fares El-Bakh; Qatar	215 kg	Reza Dehdar; Iran	202 kg	Sharofiddin Amriddinov; Uzbekistan	196 kg
Total	Fares El-Bakh; Qatar	386 kg	Reza Dehdar; Iran	372 kg	Sharofiddin Amriddinov; Uzbekistan	368 kg
109 kg
Snatch	Rasoul Motamedi; Iran	180 kg	Bekdoolot Rasulbekov; Kyrgyzstan	173 kg	Amir Azizi; Iran	166 kg
Clean & Jerk	Rasoul Motamedi; Iran	217 kg	Bekdoolot Rasulbekov; Kyrgyzstan	216 kg	Dong Bing-cheng; Chinese Taipei	210 kg
Total	Rasoul Motamedi; Iran	397 kg	Bekdoolot Rasulbekov; Kyrgyzstan	389 kg	Dong Bing-cheng; Chinese Taipei	375 kg
+109 kg
Snatch	Gor Minasyan; Bahrain	210 kg	Ali Davoudi; Iran	195 kg	Mohsen Dadras; Iran	190 kg
Clean & Jerk	Ali Davoudi; Iran	243 kg	Gor Minasyan; Bahrain	242 kg	Mohsen Dadras; Iran	217 kg
Total	Gor Minasyan; Bahrain	452 kg	Ali Davoudi; Iran	438 kg	Mohsen Dadras; Iran	407 kg

=== Women ===
Event	Gold		Silver		Bronze	
45 kg
Snatch	Khổng Mỹ Phượng; Vietnam	78 kg	Siti Nafisatul Hariroh; Indonesia	71 kg	Harshada Garud; India	68 kg
Clean & Jerk	Siti Nafisatul Hariroh; Indonesia	91 kg	Khổng Mỹ Phượng; Vietnam	88 kg	Rose Jean Ramos; Philippines	85 kg
Total	Khổng Mỹ Phượng; Vietnam	166 kg	Siti Nafisatul Hariroh; Indonesia	162 kg	Harshada Garud; India	152 kg
49 kg
Snatch	Wang Jiali; China	81 kg	Trần Thị Mỹ Dung; Vietnam	80 kg	Lin Cheng-jing; Chinese Taipei	79 kg
Clean & Jerk	Wang Jiali; China	105 kg	Lin Cheng-jing; Chinese Taipei	102 kg	Ýulduz Jumabaýewa; Turkmenistan	97 kg
Total	Wang Jiali; China	186 kg	Lin Cheng-jing; Chinese Taipei	181 kg	Ýulduz Jumabaýewa; Turkmenistan	172 kg
55 kg
Snatch	Yu Linglong; China	95 kg	Zulfiya Chinshanlo; Kazakhstan	95 kg	Nigora Abdullaeva; Uzbekistan	87 kg
Clean & Jerk	Zulfiya Chinshanlo; Kazakhstan	125 kg	Yu Linglong; China	115 kg	Windy Cantika Aisah; Indonesia	106 kg
Total	Zulfiya Chinshanlo; Kazakhstan	220 kg	Yu Linglong; China	210 kg	Nigora Abdullaeva; Uzbekistan	193 kg
59 kg
Snatch	Quàng Thị Tâm; Vietnam	93 kg	Enkhbaataryn Enkhtamir; Mongolia	92 kg	Long Xue; China	91 kg
Clean & Jerk	Long Xue; China	118 kg	Natasya Beteyob; Indonesia	116 kg	Quàng Thị Tâm; Vietnam	115 kg
Total	Long Xue; China	209 kg	Quàng Thị Tâm; Vietnam	208 kg	Natasya Beteyob; Indonesia	205 kg
64 kg
Snatch	Phạm Thị Hồng Thanh; Vietnam	100 kg	Thipwara Chontavin; Thailand	91 kg	Sarah; Indonesia	89 kg
Clean & Jerk	Phạm Thị Hồng Thanh; Vietnam	117 kg	Sarah; Indonesia	112 kg	Li Wei-chia; Chinese Taipei	111 kg
Total	Phạm Thị Hồng Thanh; Vietnam	217 kg	Thipwara Chontavin; Thailand	201 kg	Sarah; Indonesia	201 kg
71 kg
Snatch	Yang Qiuxia; China	106 kg	Gülnabat Kadyrowa; Turkmenistan	102 kg	Ganzorigiin Anuujin; Mongolia	99 kg
Clean & Jerk	Yang Qiuxia; China	122 kg	Restu Anggi; Indonesia	120 kg	Tsabitha Alfiah Ramadani; Indonesia	118 kg
Total	Yang Qiuxia; China	228 kg	Gülnabat Kadyrowa; Turkmenistan	219 kg	Ganzorigiin Anuujin; Mongolia	215 kg
76 kg
Snatch	Peng Cuiting; China	115 kg	Otgonbayaryn Darkhijav; Mongolia	98 kg	Aray Nurlybekova; Kazakhstan	97 kg
Clean & Jerk	Peng Cuiting; China	128 kg	Duangkamon Khongthong; Thailand	125 kg	Aray Nurlybekova; Kazakhstan	124 kg
Total	Peng Cuiting; China	243 kg	Aray Nurlybekova; Kazakhstan	221 kg	Duangkamon Khongthong; Thailand	221 kg
81 kg
Snatch	Elham Hosseini; Iran	102 kg	Motoka Nakajima; Japan	100 kg	Rigina Adashbaeva; Uzbekistan	97 kg
Clean & Jerk	Elham Hosseini; Iran	125 kg	Aisha Omarova; Kazakhstan	124 kg	Motoka Nakajima; Japan	123 kg
Total	Elham Hosseini; Iran	227 kg	Motoka Nakajima; Japan	223 kg	Aisha Omarova; Kazakhstan	217 kg
87 kg
Snatch	Mönkhjantsangiin Ankhtsetseg; Mongolia	114 kg	Tursunoy Jabborova; Uzbekistan	112 kg	Lo Ying-yuan; Chinese Taipei	110 kg
Clean & Jerk	Mönkhjantsangiin Ankhtsetseg; Mongolia	135 kg	Lo Ying-yuan; Chinese Taipei	133 kg	Tian Chia-hsin; Chinese Taipei	131 kg
Total	Mönkhjantsangiin Ankhtsetseg; Mongolia	249 kg	Lo Ying-yuan; Chinese Taipei	243 kg	Tursunoy Jabborova; Uzbekistan	242 kg
+87 kg
Snatch	Aizada Muptilda; Kazakhstan	120 kg	Lyubov Kovalchuk; Kazakhstan	115 kg	Nurul Akmal; Indonesia	114 kg
Clean & Jerk	Aizada Muptilda; Kazakhstan	157 kg	Nurul Akmal; Indonesia	153 kg	Lyubov Kovalchuk; Kazakhstan	151 kg
Total	Aizada Muptilda; Kazakhstan	277 kg	Nurul Akmal; Indonesia	267 kg	Lyubov Kovalchuk; Kazakhstan	266 kg

== Medal table ==
Ranking by Big (Total result) medals

Rank	Nation	Gold	Silver	Bronze	Total
1	China	6	2	0	8
2	Kazakhstan	3	2	3	8
3	Vietnam	3	2	0	5
4	Iran	2	2	2	6
5	Uzbekistan	2	0	4	6
6	Bahrain	2	0	0	2
7	Mongolia	1	0	1	2
8	Qatar	1	0	0	1
9	Indonesia	0	4	3	7
10	Chinese Taipei	0	3	1	4
11	Kyrgyzstan	0	2	0	2
12	Thailand	0	1	2	3
13	Turkmenistan	0	1	1	2
14	Japan	0	1	0	1
15	Saudi Arabia	0	0	2	2
16	India	0	0	1	1
Totals (16 entries)		20	20	20	60

Ranking by all medals: Big (Total result) and Small (Snatch and Clean & Jerk)

Rank	Nation	Gold	Silver	Bronze	Total
1	China	16	5	1	22
2	Kazakhstan	9	6	8	23
3	Vietnam	9	6	1	16
4	Iran	7	5	7	19
5	Uzbekistan	6	3	9	18
6	Bahrain	4	2	0	6
7	Indonesia	3	11	9	23
8	Mongolia	3	2	2	7
9	Qatar	2	1	0	3
10	Kyrgyzstan	1	4	1	6
11	Chinese Taipei	0	6	7	13
12	Thailand	0	3	4	7
13	Turkmenistan	0	2	3	5
14	Japan	0	2	1	3
15	Saudi Arabia	0	1	4	5
16	Malaysia	0	1	0	1
17	India	0	0	2	2
18	Philippines	0	0	1	1
Totals (18 entries)		60	60	60	180

== Team ranking ==
=== Men ===
Rank	Team	Points
1	Kazakhstan	658
2	Uzbekistan	655
3	Iran	631
4	Chinese Taipei	466
5	Turkmenistan	448
6	India	399

=== Women ===
Rank	Team	Points
1	Indonesia	631
2	Chinese Taipei	580
3	Kazakhstan	550
4	Iran	436
5	China	409
6	India	373

== Participating nations ==
183 athletes from 28 nations competed.

- Bangladesh (4)
- Bahrain (5)
- Brunei (2)
- China (8)
- Chinese Taipei (20)
- India (13)
- Indonesia (16)
- Iran (17)
- Iraq (3)
- Japan (1)
- Jordan (2)
- Kazakhstan (18)
- Kyrgyzstan (3)
- Laos (1)
- Malaysia (2)
- Mongolia (4)
- Pakistan (3)
- Philippines (2)
- Qatar (1)
- Saudi Arabia (11)
- Singapore (2)
- South Korea (2)
- Thailand (5)
- Turkmenistan (12)
- United Arab Emirates (1)
- Uzbekistan (15)
- Vietnam (7)
- Yemen (3)

== Men's results ==
=== 55 kg ===
Rank	Athlete	Group	Snatch (kg)				Clean & Jerk (kg)				Total
Rank	Athlete	Group	1	2	3	Rank	1	2	3	Rank	Total
1st place, gold medalist(s)	Lại Gia Thành (VIE)	A	118	120	~~123~~	1st place, gold medalist(s)	142	~~146~~	~~146~~	2nd place, silver medalist(s)	262
2nd place, silver medalist(s)	Arli Chontey (KAZ)	A	113	116	~~118~~	3rd place, bronze medalist(s)	137	140	144	1st place, gold medalist(s)	260
3rd place, bronze medalist(s)	Mansour Al-Saleem (KSA)	A	113	~~117~~	119	2nd place, silver medalist(s)	135	140	~~145~~	3rd place, bronze medalist(s)	259
4	Satrio Adi Nugroho (INA)	A	~~107~~	107	~~112~~	5	~~136~~	138	~~141~~	4	245
5	Fernando Agad (PHI)	A	~~108~~	108	~~112~~	4	135	~~139~~	~~141~~	5	243
6	Basel Abdullah (YEM)	A	70	76	79	6	90	98	103	6	182
7	Thy Nasod (LAO)	A	~~75~~	75	~~78~~	7	95	98	~~102~~	7	173

=== 61 kg ===
Rank	Athlete	Group	Snatch (kg)				Clean & Jerk (kg)				Total
Rank	Athlete	Group	1	2	3	Rank	1	2	3	Rank	Total
1st place, gold medalist(s)	Jia Xionghui (CHN)	A	135	140	~~146~~	1st place, gold medalist(s)	147	~~156~~	156	4	296
2nd place, silver medalist(s)	Nguyễn Trần Anh Tuấn (VIE)	A	126	132	134	2nd place, silver medalist(s)	156	161	~~164~~	1st place, gold medalist(s)	295
3rd place, bronze medalist(s)	Ricko Saputra (INA)	A	125	131	133	3rd place, bronze medalist(s)	158	~~164~~	~~164~~	3rd place, bronze medalist(s)	291
4	Aniq Kasdan (MAS)	B	108	113	~~117~~	10	143	150	160	2nd place, silver medalist(s)	273
5	Seraj Al-Saleem (KSA)	A	116	120	124	4	148	~~155~~	~~155~~	7	272
6	Rishikanta Singh (IND)	A	~~117~~	117	120	5	147	~~151~~	151	5	271
7	Madhavan Thirumurugan (IND)	A	116	~~120~~	~~120~~	7	140	144	147	8	263
8	Otepbergen Aliyev (KAZ)	A	115	~~121~~	~~121~~	9	145	~~150~~	~~150~~	9	260
9	Ishimbek Muratbek Uulu (KGZ)	B	108	~~115~~	~~115~~	12	142	~~150~~	150	6	258
10	Ihtiýor Matkerimow (TKM)	A	116	~~119~~	~~120~~	8	140	~~145~~	~~145~~	10	256
11	Majid Askari (IRI)	B	110	~~117~~	117	6	126	132	~~140~~	12	249
12	Wang Chu-yang (TPE)	B	110	~~115~~	~~115~~	11	~~130~~	130	~~135~~	13	240
13	Ali Kalitit (KSA)	B	96	100	~~105~~	13	116	121	125	14	225
14	Nashrul Abu Bakar (BRU)	B	92	96	100	14	123	~~127~~	~~128~~	15	223
—	Tang Chi-chung (TPE)	B	~~110~~	~~110~~	~~110~~	—	135	~~141~~	~~141~~	11	—

=== 67 kg ===
Rank	Athlete	Group	Snatch (kg)				Clean & Jerk (kg)				Total
Rank	Athlete	Group	1	2	3	Rank	1	2	3	Rank	Total
1st place, gold medalist(s)	Adkhamjon Ergashev (UZB)	A	134	~~138~~	138	1st place, gold medalist(s)	169	173	176	1st place, gold medalist(s)	314
2nd place, silver medalist(s)	Mohammad Yasin (INA)	A	132	~~136~~	137	2nd place, silver medalist(s)	160	166	~~171~~	2nd place, silver medalist(s)	303
3rd place, bronze medalist(s)	Anucha Doungsri (THA)	A	~~133~~	133	136	3rd place, bronze medalist(s)	165	~~168~~	~~170~~	3rd place, bronze medalist(s)	301
4	Anatoliy Savelyev (KAZ)	A	125	130	135	4	160	164	~~167~~	4	299
5	Aznil Bidin (MAS)	A	125	130	~~135~~	5	155	161	~~167~~	5	291
6	Tario Markio (IND)	A	123	~~126~~	~~126~~	7	154	158	~~162~~	6	281
7	Hydyrberdi Yagmyrow (TKM)	A	126	130	~~133~~	6	150	~~151~~	~~156~~	8	280
8	Choi Han-ju (KOR)	A	112	116	~~120~~	8	140	147	151	7	267
—	Kester Yi Liang Loy (SGP)	A	107	~~111~~	~~111~~	9	~~133~~	~~133~~	~~133~~	—	—

=== 73 kg ===
Rank	Athlete	Group	Snatch (kg)				Clean & Jerk (kg)				Total
Rank	Athlete	Group	1	2	3	Rank	1	2	3	Rank	Total
1st place, gold medalist(s)	Doston Yokubov (UZB)	A	135	138	140	3rd place, bronze medalist(s)	176	182	~~185~~	1st place, gold medalist(s)	322
2nd place, silver medalist(s)	Xiang Shulin (CHN)	A	138	143	~~148~~	2nd place, silver medalist(s)	178	~~183~~	~~183~~	2nd place, silver medalist(s)	321
3rd place, bronze medalist(s)	Nawaf Al-Mazyadi (KSA)	A	133	137	139	4	163	170	~~177~~	3rd place, bronze medalist(s)	309
4	Chen Wang-heng (TPE)	A	130	~~135~~	~~136~~	5	150	160	~~165~~	4	290
5	Beksultan Aitbay (KAZ)	A	120	~~125~~	125	6	160	~~170~~	~~171~~	5	285
—	Rizki Juniansyah (INA)	A	147	152	~~158~~	1st place, gold medalist(s)	~~186~~	~~186~~	~~186~~	—	—

=== 81 kg ===
Rank	Athlete	Group	Snatch (kg)				Clean & Jerk (kg)				Total
Rank	Athlete	Group	1	2	3	Rank	1	2	3	Rank	Total
1st place, gold medalist(s)	Lu Delin (CHN)	A	161	165	~~170~~	1st place, gold medalist(s)	179	183	188	4	353
2nd place, silver medalist(s)	Rahmat Erwin Abdullah (INA)	A	141	151	—	3rd place, bronze medalist(s)	181	191	198	1st place, gold medalist(s)	349
3rd place, bronze medalist(s)	Mukhammadkodir Toshtemirov (UZB)	A	154	~~159~~	~~160~~	2nd place, silver medalist(s)	183	192	~~199~~	2nd place, silver medalist(s)	346
4	Ogabek Tukhtaev (UZB)	A	138	141	145	6	178	184	189	3rd place, bronze medalist(s)	334
5	Renat Baudarbekov (KAZ)	A	140	~~145~~	146	5	180	187	~~191~~	5	333
6	Gaýgysyz Töräýew (TKM)	A	136	~~140~~	142	7	172	177	~~181~~	6	319
7	Valluri Ajaya Babu (IND)	B	132	~~137~~	137	8	157	162	165	7	302
8	Furqan Anwar (PAK)	B	127	132	~~136~~	9	157	161	163	9	295
9	Cai Zhi-hao (TPE)	B	~~116~~	116	125	11	150	~~160~~	163	8	288
10	Loh Yuan Yee (SGP)	B	130	~~140~~	~~140~~	10	150	~~158~~	~~160~~	10	280
11	Huthefh Ahmed (YEM)	B	~~80~~	80	~~90~~	12	~~100~~	100	~~110~~	11	180
—	Chuang Sheng-min (TPE)	A	145	~~150~~	150	4	~~180~~	~~180~~	~~180~~	—	—

=== 89 kg ===
Rank	Athlete	Group	Snatch (kg)				Clean & Jerk (kg)				Total
Rank	Athlete	Group	1	2	3	Rank	1	2	3	Rank	Total
1st place, gold medalist(s)	Assylzhan Bektay (KAZ)	A	157	162	165	2nd place, silver medalist(s)	191	195	197	1st place, gold medalist(s)	362
2nd place, silver medalist(s)	Emil Moldodosov (KGZ)	A	161	164	166	1st place, gold medalist(s)	191	~~195~~	195	3rd place, bronze medalist(s)	361
3rd place, bronze medalist(s)	Masoud Chatraei (IRI)	A	~~161~~	162	~~166~~	5	191	196	~~201~~	2nd place, silver medalist(s)	358
4	Şatlyk Şöhradow (TKM)	A	~~159~~	160	~~164~~	6	190	~~195~~	~~199~~	5	350
5	Sarvarbek Zafarjonov (UZB)	A	158	163	~~166~~	4	182	~~196~~	—	7	345
6	Khojiakbar Olimov (UZB)	B	146	~~151~~	152	8	185	191	~~195~~	4	343
7	Kirill Staroverkin (KAZ)	B	147	151	153	7	173	177	~~180~~	10	330
8	Jeong Yong-hun (KOR)	B	~~140~~	140	145	11	~~180~~	185	~~193~~	6	330
9	Rüstem Annaberdiýew (TKM)	A	~~150~~	150	~~156~~	9	180	~~186~~	~~192~~	9	330
10	Chen Hsiang-yu (TPE)	B	~~140~~	140	~~146~~	12	~~180~~	180	~~186~~	8	320
11	Nikhil Tugnait (IND)	B	137	~~141~~	~~141~~	13	164	168	171	11	308
12	Ali Hussain (BRN)	B	120	126	~~130~~	14	157	~~162~~	162	12	288
—	Mohammad Zareei (IRI)	A	160	~~164~~	165	3rd place, bronze medalist(s)	~~192~~	~~192~~	—	—	—
—	Muhammad Zul Ilmi (INA)	B	145	~~152~~	~~152~~	10	—	—	—	—	—
—	Pranto Shakayet (BAN)	B	125	~~130~~	~~130~~	15	—	—	—	—	—

=== 96 kg ===
Rank	Athlete	Group	Snatch (kg)				Clean & Jerk (kg)				Total
Rank	Athlete	Group	1	2	3	Rank	1	2	3	Rank	Total
1st place, gold medalist(s)	Lesman Paredes (BRN)	A	178	182	—	1st place, gold medalist(s)	205	210	215	2nd place, silver medalist(s)	397
2nd place, silver medalist(s)	Chen Po-jen (TPE)	A	~~172~~	172	177	2nd place, silver medalist(s)	195	201	206	3rd place, bronze medalist(s)	383
3rd place, bronze medalist(s)	Artyom Antropov (KAZ)	A	~~158~~	158	~~162~~	7	210	219	~~221~~	1st place, gold medalist(s)	377
4	Nurgissa Adiletuly (KAZ)	A	167	172	~~176~~	3rd place, bronze medalist(s)	198	204	~~212~~	4	376
5	Reza Beiranvand (IRI)	A	156	163	~~168~~	5	192	~~199~~	202	5	365
6	Layth Al-Chlaihawi (IRQ)	A	156	~~160~~	~~160~~	10	192	197	~~200~~	6	353
7	Alireza Moeini (IRI)	B	~~162~~	162	~~168~~	6	180	~~186~~	186	9	348
8	Döwranbek Hasanbaýew (TKM)	B	161	165	~~169~~	4	170	180	~~186~~	12	345
9	Şahzad Matýakubow (TKM)	B	148	151	155	11	177	182	190	7	345
10	Sunnatilla Usarov (UZB)	A	157	~~164~~	~~166~~	8	187	~~192~~	~~192~~	8	344
11	Kurbonmurod Nomozov (UZB)	B	~~146~~	148	152	12	~~181~~	~~184~~	184	10	336
12	Ali Al-Othman (KSA)	B	140	~~146~~	~~149~~	13	165	175	182	11	322
13	Rahman Ashikur (BAN)	B	115	120	125	14	150	155	~~160~~	13	280
—	Hayder Al-Badrawi (IRQ)	A	156	~~161~~	~~161~~	9	~~192~~	~~193~~	~~193~~	—	—

=== 102 kg ===
Rank	Athlete	Group	Snatch (kg)				Clean & Jerk (kg)				Total
Rank	Athlete	Group	1	2	3	Rank	1	2	3	Rank	Total
1st place, gold medalist(s)	Fares El-Bakh (QAT)	A	171	~~175~~	~~176~~	2nd place, silver medalist(s)	215	—	—	1st place, gold medalist(s)	386
2nd place, silver medalist(s)	Reza Dehdar (IRI)	A	170	~~176~~	~~176~~	3rd place, bronze medalist(s)	202	~~221~~	~~222~~	2nd place, silver medalist(s)	372
3rd place, bronze medalist(s)	Sharofiddin Amriddinov (UZB)	A	161	166	172	1st place, gold medalist(s)	191	196	~~201~~	3rd place, bronze medalist(s)	368
4	Rakhat Bekbolat (KAZ)	A	150	160	~~165~~	4	190	~~209~~	~~209~~	4	350
5	Harshit Sehrawat (IND)	A	135	140	144	6	174	179	184	5	328
6	Harcharan Singh (IND)	A	144	~~148~~	148	5	171	175	179	6	327

=== 109 kg ===
Rank	Athlete	Group	Snatch (kg)				Clean & Jerk (kg)				Total
Rank	Athlete	Group	1	2	3	Rank	1	2	3	Rank	Total
1st place, gold medalist(s)	Rasoul Motamedi (IRI)	A	170	174	180	1st place, gold medalist(s)	215	217	—	1st place, gold medalist(s)	397
2nd place, silver medalist(s)	Bekdoolot Rasulbekov (KGZ)	A	165	170	173	2nd place, silver medalist(s)	206	211	216	2nd place, silver medalist(s)	389
3rd place, bronze medalist(s)	Dong Bing-cheng (TPE)	A	165	~~170~~	~~171~~	4	203	206	210	3rd place, bronze medalist(s)	375
4	Amir Azizi (IRI)	A	166	~~172~~	~~172~~	3rd place, bronze medalist(s)	195	204	208	4	374
5	Ali Al-Khazal (KSA)	A	160	~~166~~	~~166~~	5	190	~~200~~	204	6	364
6	Usman Amjad Rathore (PAK)	A	135	140	144	6	175	182	186	7	330
—	Ali Rubaiawi (IRQ)	A	~~170~~	~~171~~	~~172~~	—	~~200~~	201	207	5	—

=== +109 kg ===
Rank	Athlete	Group	Snatch (kg)				Clean & Jerk (kg)				Total
Rank	Athlete	Group	1	2	3	Rank	1	2	3	Rank	Total
1st place, gold medalist(s)	Gor Minasyan (BRN)	A	201	205	210	1st place, gold medalist(s)	237	~~242~~	242	2nd place, silver medalist(s)	452
2nd place, silver medalist(s)	Ali Davoudi (IRI)	A	195	~~201~~	~~202~~	2nd place, silver medalist(s)	238	243	~~250~~	1st place, gold medalist(s)	438
3rd place, bronze medalist(s)	Mohsen Dadras (IRI)	A	183	190	~~196~~	3rd place, bronze medalist(s)	217	~~225~~	—	3rd place, bronze medalist(s)	407
4	Hojamuhammet Toýçyýew (TKM)	A	160	168	~~174~~	7	200	205	213	4	381
5	Jin Cheng (TPE)	A	~~170~~	170	~~180~~	6	210	~~218~~	—	5	380
6	Mirkhosil Mirzabaev (UZB)	A	162	~~170~~	171	5	190	201	~~206~~	6	372
7	Rungsuriya Panya (THA)	A	152	157	~~161~~	8	190	~~196~~	196	7	353
8	Muhammad Abdullah Butt (PAK)	A	140	~~145~~	145	9	180	—	—	8	325
9	Turki Al-Yami (KSA)	A	137	141	~~145~~	10	~~165~~	165	171	9	312
—	Hsieh Yun-ting (TPE)	A	~~175~~	175	~~182~~	4	~~211~~	—	—	—	—

== Women's results ==
=== 45 kg ===
Rank	Athlete	Group	Snatch (kg)				Clean & Jerk (kg)				Total
Rank	Athlete	Group	1	2	3	Rank	1	2	3	Rank	Total
1st place, gold medalist(s)	Khổng Mỹ Phượng (VIE)	A	74	76	78	1st place, gold medalist(s)	~~88~~	88	~~92~~	2nd place, silver medalist(s)	166
2nd place, silver medalist(s)	Siti Nafisatul Hariroh (INA)	A	68	71	~~73~~	2nd place, silver medalist(s)	~~87~~	88	91	1st place, gold medalist(s)	162
3rd place, bronze medalist(s)	Harshada Garud (IND)	A	~~65~~	65	68	3rd place, bronze medalist(s)	81	84	~~87~~	4	152
4	Rose Jean Ramos (PHI)	A	67	~~70~~	~~70~~	4	82	85	~~87~~	3rd place, bronze medalist(s)	152
5	Hong Zi-yu (TPE)	A	65	67	~~69~~	5	~~83~~	83	~~86~~	5	150
6	Ghadah Al-Tassan (KSA)	A	43	45	~~47~~	7	58	61	~~65~~	6	106
—	Najla Khoirunnisa (INA)	A	60	~~65~~	~~65~~	6	~~75~~	~~75~~	~~75~~	—	—

=== 49 kg ===
Rank	Athlete	Group	Snatch (kg)				Clean & Jerk (kg)				Total
Rank	Athlete	Group	1	2	3	Rank	1	2	3	Rank	Total
1st place, gold medalist(s)	Wang Jiali (CHN)	A	~~80~~	81	~~85~~	1st place, gold medalist(s)	100	103	105	1st place, gold medalist(s)	186
2nd place, silver medalist(s)	Lin Cheng-jing (TPE)	A	~~79~~	79	~~81~~	4	96	100	102	2nd place, silver medalist(s)	181
3rd place, bronze medalist(s)	Ýulduz Jumabaýewa (TKM)	A	~~73~~	75	~~77~~	7	94	97	~~101~~	3rd place, bronze medalist(s)	172
4	Jhilli Dalabehera (IND)	A	74	~~77~~	77	5	90	94	~~98~~	6	171
5	Gyaneshwari Yadav (IND)	A	72	76	~~79~~	6	88	92	95	4	171
6	Jamila Panfilova (UZB)	A	76	79	~~81~~	3rd place, bronze medalist(s)	86	89	~~92~~	7	168
7	Huang Yi-chen (TPE)	A	68	~~72~~	72	8	88	94	~~97~~	5	166
8	Darya Balabayuk (KAZ)	A	68	71	~~73~~	9	80	84	~~86~~	8	155
9	Monerah Al-Rowitea (KSA)	A	45	48	50	10	58	62	65	9	115
—	Trần Thị Mỹ Dung (VIE)	A	~~79~~	80	~~82~~	2nd place, silver medalist(s)	~~93~~	~~93~~	~~93~~	—	—

=== 55 kg ===
Rank	Athlete	Group	Snatch (kg)				Clean & Jerk (kg)				Total
Rank	Athlete	Group	1	2	3	Rank	1	2	3	Rank	Total
1st place, gold medalist(s)	Zulfiya Chinshanlo (KAZ)	A	90	93	95	2nd place, silver medalist(s)	120	125	~~130~~	1st place, gold medalist(s)	220
2nd place, silver medalist(s)	Yu Linglong (CHN)	A	90	95	~~98~~	1st place, gold medalist(s)	115	~~121~~	~~121~~	2nd place, silver medalist(s)	210
3rd place, bronze medalist(s)	Nigora Abdullaeva (UZB)	A	82	84	87	3rd place, bronze medalist(s)	100	104	106	4	193
4	Windy Cantika Aisah (INA)	A	80	83	86	4	98	103	106	3rd place, bronze medalist(s)	192
5	Poisian Yodsarn (THA)	A	80	83	~~87~~	5	101	105	~~107~~	5	188
6	Juliana Klarisa (INA)	A	78	~~81~~	~~81~~	7	100	103	~~107~~	7	181
7	Shrabani Das (IND)	A	74	77	~~80~~	8	100	104	~~107~~	6	181
8	Eman Abdulnabi (BRN)	A	~~54~~	54	56	9	70	73	~~75~~	8	129
9	Liyana Safiah (BRU)	A	52	55	~~57~~	10	65	68	~~70~~	9	125
—	Kristina Şermetowa (TKM)	A	~~82~~	~~83~~	83	6	~~104~~	~~105~~	~~107~~	—	—

=== 59 kg ===
Rank	Athlete	Group	Snatch (kg)				Clean & Jerk (kg)				Total
Rank	Athlete	Group	1	2	3	Rank	1	2	3	Rank	Total
1st place, gold medalist(s)	Long Xue (CHN)	A	87	91	~~94~~	3rd place, bronze medalist(s)	~~118~~	~~118~~	118	1st place, gold medalist(s)	209
2nd place, silver medalist(s)	Quàng Thị Tâm (VIE)	A	93	~~96~~	~~96~~	1st place, gold medalist(s)	110	115	~~119~~	3rd place, bronze medalist(s)	208
3rd place, bronze medalist(s)	Natasya Beteyob (INA)	A	85	89	~~91~~	5	111	~~115~~	116	2nd place, silver medalist(s)	205
4	Hoàng Thị Duyên (VIE)	A	~~99~~	90	~~93~~	4	109	~~113~~	~~113~~	4	199
5	Enkhbaataryn Enkhtamir (MGL)	A	86	89	92	2nd place, silver medalist(s)	106	~~112~~	~~112~~	6	198
6	Nelly (INA)	A	84	~~87~~	~~87~~	6	108	~~113~~	~~115~~	5	192
7	Huang Ya-ting (TPE)	A	81	~~83~~	83	7	100	103	~~106~~	7	186
8	Poupak Basami (IRI)	A	75	~~80~~	~~80~~	8	95	~~100~~	~~100~~	8	170
9	Alanoud Al-Shehri (KSA)	A	63	67	70	9	76	80	83	9	153

=== 64 kg ===
Rank	Athlete	Group	Snatch (kg)				Clean & Jerk (kg)				Total
Rank	Athlete	Group	1	2	3	Rank	1	2	3	Rank	Total
1st place, gold medalist(s)	Phạm Thị Hồng Thanh (VIE)	A	92	96	100	1st place, gold medalist(s)	114	117	—	1st place, gold medalist(s)	217
2nd place, silver medalist(s)	Thipwara Chontavin (THA)	A	89	~~91~~	91	2nd place, silver medalist(s)	~~110~~	110	~~113~~	4	201
3rd place, bronze medalist(s)	Sarah (INA)	A	85	89	~~91~~	3rd place, bronze medalist(s)	105	109	112	2nd place, silver medalist(s)	201
4	Li Wei-chia (TPE)	A	85	88	~~90~~	4	101	107	111	3rd place, bronze medalist(s)	199
5	Fatemeh Keshavarz (IRI)	A	80	~~86~~	~~86~~	5	100	~~106~~	~~106~~	5	180
6	Sarah Abu Shawish (JOR)	A	70	75	~~81~~	6	85	90	95	6	170

=== 71 kg ===
Rank	Athlete	Group	Snatch (kg)				Clean & Jerk (kg)				Total
Rank	Athlete	Group	1	2	3	Rank	1	2	3	Rank	Total
1st place, gold medalist(s)	Yang Qiuxia (CHN)	A	100	103	106	1st place, gold medalist(s)	120	122	~~130~~	1st place, gold medalist(s)	228
2nd place, silver medalist(s)	Gülnabat Kadyrowa (TKM)	A	96	100	102	2nd place, silver medalist(s)	~~117~~	117	~~120~~	4	219
3rd place, bronze medalist(s)	Ganzorigiin Anuujin (MGL)	A	95	99	~~102~~	3rd place, bronze medalist(s)	116	~~121~~	~~121~~	5	215
4	Tsabitha Alfiah Ramadani (INA)	A	93	96	~~101~~	4	113	~~117~~	118	3rd place, bronze medalist(s)	214
5	Restu Anggi (INA)	A	88	~~92~~	92	5	~~117~~	117	120	2nd place, silver medalist(s)	212
6	Elaheh Razzaghi (IRI)	A	85	90	~~92~~	6	111	~~116~~	~~116~~	6	201
7	Li Xing-en (TPE)	A	85	90	~~93~~	7	~~110~~	110	~~116~~	7	200
8	Forough Younesi (IRI)	B	75	80	83	8	95	100	~~103~~	9	183
9	Mabia Akhter (BAN)	B	73	76	79	9	97	101	104	8	183
10	Mada Sulaimani (KSA)	B	68	73	~~77~~	11	88	95	~~100~~	10	168
11	Zainab Yahya (BRN)	B	70	73	76	10	88	91	~~96~~	11	167
12	Mai Al-Madani (UAE)	B	~~65~~	65	69	12	80	85	~~91~~	12	154
—	Chen Wen-huei (TPE)	A	~~98~~	~~98~~	~~99~~	—	—	—	—	—	—

=== 76 kg ===
Rank	Athlete	Group	Snatch (kg)				Clean & Jerk (kg)				Total
Rank	Athlete	Group	1	2	3	Rank	1	2	3	Rank	Total
1st place, gold medalist(s)	Peng Cuiting (CHN)	A	115	~~120~~	~~120~~	1st place, gold medalist(s)	116	124	128	1st place, gold medalist(s)	243
2nd place, silver medalist(s)	Aray Nurlybekova (KAZ)	A	90	94	97	3rd place, bronze medalist(s)	118	124	~~127~~	3rd place, bronze medalist(s)	221
3rd place, bronze medalist(s)	Duangkamon Khongthong (THA)	A	~~93~~	93	96	4	123	125	~~127~~	2nd place, silver medalist(s)	221
4	Otgonbayaryn Darkhijav (MGL)	A	~~94~~	95	98	2nd place, silver medalist(s)	108	115	~~119~~	5	213
5	Nigora Suvonova (UZB)	A	~~87~~	87	~~91~~	5	111	116	~~119~~	4	203
6	Abrisham Arjomandkhah (IRI)	A	85	~~90~~	~~91~~	6	110	~~115~~	~~117~~	6	195
7	Dema Zebdieh (JOR)	A	70	75	80	7	90	95	~~100~~	7	175
8	Hanan Fahd (YEM)	A	~~60~~	60	64	8	78	~~82~~	~~82~~	8	142

=== 81 kg ===
Rank	Athlete	Group	Snatch (kg)				Clean & Jerk (kg)				Total
Rank	Athlete	Group	1	2	3	Rank	1	2	3	Rank	Total
1st place, gold medalist(s)	Elham Hosseini (IRI)	A	97	100	102	1st place, gold medalist(s)	121	125	~~128~~	1st place, gold medalist(s)	227
2nd place, silver medalist(s)	Motoka Nakajima (JPN)	A	97	~~100~~	100	2nd place, silver medalist(s)	~~119~~	119	123	3rd place, bronze medalist(s)	223
3rd place, bronze medalist(s)	Aisha Omarova (KAZ)	A	93	~~96~~	~~98~~	5	117	121	124	2nd place, silver medalist(s)	217
4	Rigina Adashbaeva (UZB)	A	94	97	~~101~~	3rd place, bronze medalist(s)	115	~~119~~	~~119~~	5	212
5	Anamjan Rustamowa (TKM)	A	90	~~93~~	94	4	114	~~118~~	~~118~~	6	208
6	Vanshita Verma (IND)	A	85	88	~~91~~	7	108	112	116	4	204
7	Karina Kuzganbayeva (KAZ)	A	90	~~94~~	~~94~~	6	~~113~~	113	~~116~~	7	203

=== 87 kg ===
Rank	Athlete	Group	Snatch (kg)				Clean & Jerk (kg)				Total
Rank	Athlete	Group	1	2	3	Rank	1	2	3	Rank	Total
1st place, gold medalist(s)	Mönkhjantsangiin Ankhtsetseg (MGL)	A	111	114	~~116~~	1st place, gold medalist(s)	~~135~~	135	~~145~~	1st place, gold medalist(s)	249
2nd place, silver medalist(s)	Lo Ying-yuan (TPE)	A	104	108	110	3rd place, bronze medalist(s)	126	130	133	2nd place, silver medalist(s)	243
3rd place, bronze medalist(s)	Tursunoy Jabborova (UZB)	A	103	107	112	2nd place, silver medalist(s)	123	127	130	4	242
4	Tian Chia-hsin (TPE)	A	96	99	~~102~~	4	124	128	131	3rd place, bronze medalist(s)	230
5	Aiym Yeszhanova (KAZ)	A	90	93	96	5	120	123	~~126~~	5	219
6	Khatun Tania (BAN)	A	~~60~~	60	64	6	70	75	~~78~~	6	139

=== +87 kg ===
Rank	Athlete	Group	Snatch (kg)				Clean & Jerk (kg)				Total
Rank	Athlete	Group	1	2	3	Rank	1	2	3	Rank	Total
1st place, gold medalist(s)	Aizada Muptilda (KAZ)	A	113	117	120	1st place, gold medalist(s)	147	152	157	1st place, gold medalist(s)	277
2nd place, silver medalist(s)	Nurul Akmal (INA)	A	105	110	114	3rd place, bronze medalist(s)	142	148	153	2nd place, silver medalist(s)	267
3rd place, bronze medalist(s)	Lyubov Kovalchuk (KAZ)	A	110	~~113~~	115	2nd place, silver medalist(s)	140	146	151	3rd place, bronze medalist(s)	266
4	Wang Ling-chen (TPE)	A	100	106	~~111~~	4	130	137	141	4	247
5	Fatemeh Yousefi (IRI)	A	~~90~~	90	~~93~~	6	121	128	131	5	221
6	Ann Muriyaden (IND)	A	85	89	92	5	114	~~118~~	118	6	210
