= Ricko Saputra =

Indonesian weightlifter (born 2000)

Personal information
- Born: 21 January 2000 (age 26)

Sport
- Country: Indonesia
- Sport: Weightlifting
- Weight class: 61 kg
Medal record
Men's weightlifting
Representing Indonesia
IWF Grand Prix
Gold medal – first place	2023 Havana	61 kg
Asian Championships
Silver medal – second place	2024 Tashkent	61 kg
Bronze medal – third place	2022 Manama	61 kg
Islamic Solidarity Games
Gold medal – first place	2021 Konya	61 kg S
Gold medal – first place	2021 Konya	61 kg C&J
Gold medal – first place	2021 Konya	61 kg T (Note: At the 2021 Islamic Solidarity Games, medals from the snatch, clean & jerk and total are calculated separately and are all included in the medal table.)
SEA Games
Silver medal – second place	2025 Thailand	60 kg

Ricko Saputra (born 21 January 2000) is an Indonesian weightlifter. He won the gold medal in the men's 61 kg event at the 2021 Islamic Solidarity Games held in Konya, Turkey.

Saputra won the bronze medal in the men's 61 kg event at the 2022 Asian Weightlifting Championships held in Manama, Bahrain. He won the silver medal in his event at the 2024 Asian Weightlifting Championships held in Tashkent, Uzbekistan.

== Achievements ==
Year	Venue	Weight	Snatch (kg)				Clean & Jerk (kg)				Total	Rank
Year	Venue	Weight	1	2	3	Rank	1	2	3	Rank	Total	Rank
World Championships
2022	Bogotá, Colombia	61 kg	~~128~~	128	132	5	161	~~166~~	~~166~~	5	293	5
2023	Riyadh, Saudi Arabia	61 kg	129	~~134~~	134	5	~~160~~	~~167~~	~~167~~	—	—	—
2024	Manama, Bahrain	61 kg	~~127~~	127	~~131~~	6	~~157~~	~~157~~	~~160~~	—	—	—
2026	Ningbo, China	65 kg	132	~~135~~	135	7	164	168	171	7	306	7
Asian Games
2023	Hangzhou, China	61 kg	~~128~~	~~128~~	128	—N/a	160	~~167~~	~~170~~	—N/a	288	7
2026	Nagoya, Japan	60 kg	~~128~~	130	~~134~~	—N/a	161	165	168	—N/a	298	4
Asian Championships
2022	Manama,Bahrain	61 kg	125	131	133	3rd place, bronze medalist(s)	158	~~164~~	~~164~~	3rd place, bronze medalist(s)	291	3rd place, bronze medalist(s)
2023	Jinju, South Korea	61 kg	127	131	133	3rd place, bronze medalist(s)	161	165	~~168~~	5	298	4
2024	Tashkent, Uzbekistan	61 kg	~~129~~	~~130~~	130	3rd place, bronze medalist(s)	161	~~167~~	~~171~~	2nd place, silver medalist(s)	291	2nd place, silver medalist(s)
Islamic Solidarity Games
2022	Konya, Turkey	61 kg	124	126	128	1st place, gold medalist(s)	153	156	163	1st place, gold medalist(s)	291	1st place, gold medalist(s)
