= Siti Nafisatul Hariroh =

Indonesian weightlifter (born 2001)

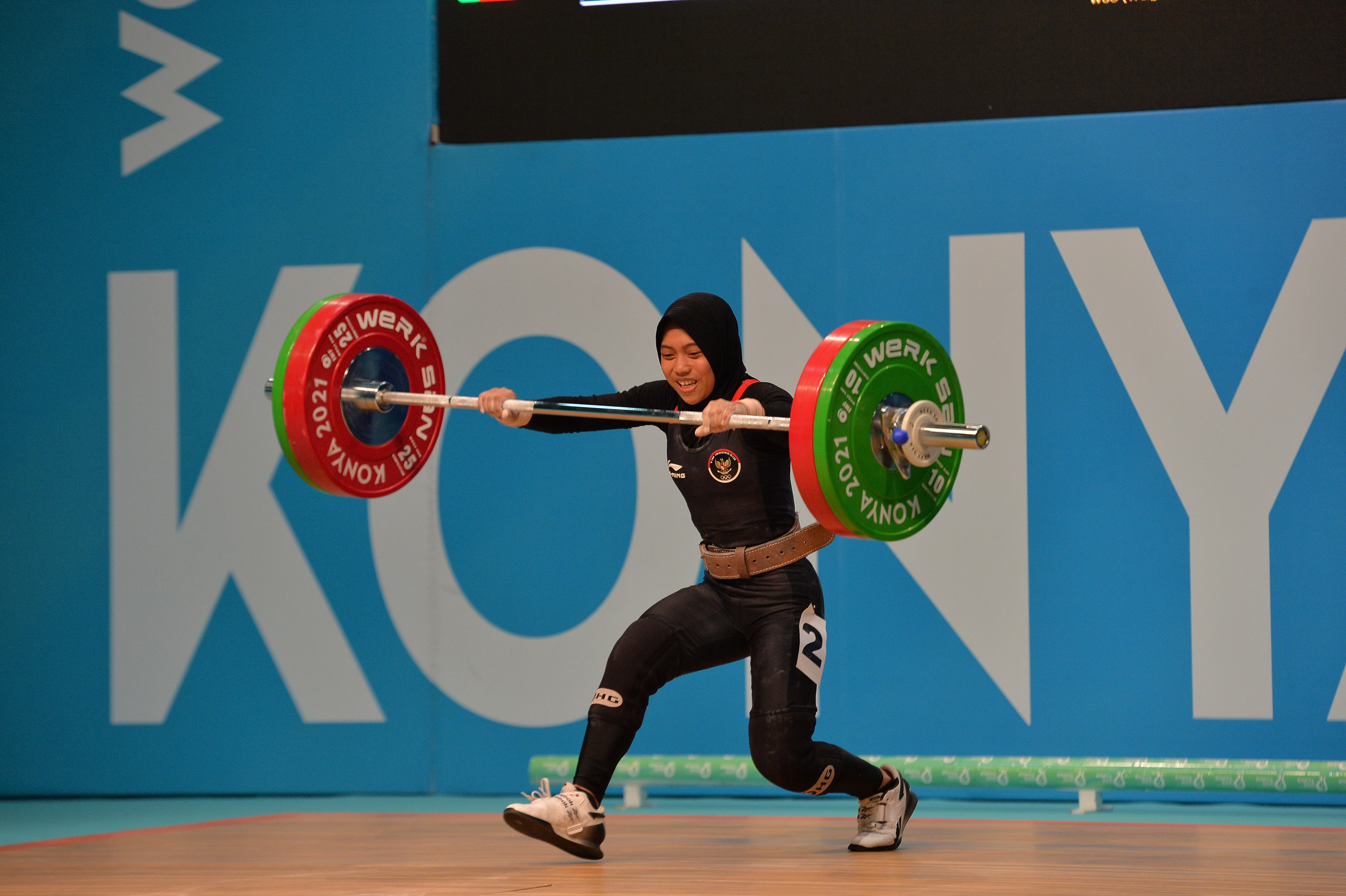

Personal information
- Born: 14 April 2001 (age 25)

Sport
- Country: Indonesia
- Sport: Weightlifting
- Weight class: 45 kg
Medal record
Women's weightlifting
Representing Indonesia
Asian Championships
Silver medal – second place	2022 Manama	45 kg
Bronze medal – third place	2023 Jinju	45 kg
Islamic Solidarity Games
Gold medal – first place	2021 Konya	45 kg S (Note: At the 2021 Islamic Solidarity Games, medals from the snatch, clean & jerk and total are calculated separately and are all included in the medal table.)
Gold medal – first place	2021 Konya	45 kg C&J
Gold medal – first place	2021 Konya	45 kg T
SEA Games
Bronze medal – third place	2021 Vietnam	45 kg

Siti Nafisatul Hariroh (born 14 April 2001) is an Indonesian weightlifter. She won the gold medal in the women's 45 kg event at the 2021 Islamic Solidarity Games held in Konya, Turkey.

She competed in the women's 49 kg event at the Junior World Weightlifting Championships held in Tashkent, Uzbekistan. She also competed in the women's 49 kg event at the 2021 World Weightlifting Championships held in Tashkent, Uzbekistan. She won the bronze medal in the women's 45 kg event at the 2021 SEA Games held in Hanoi, Vietnam.

She won the silver medal in the women's 45 kg event at the 2022 Asian Weightlifting Championships held in Manama, Bahrain.

== Achievements ==
Year	Venue	Weight	Snatch (kg)				Clean & Jerk (kg)				Total	Rank
Year	Venue	Weight	1	2	3	Rank	1	2	3	Rank	Total	Rank
World Championships
2021	Tashkent, Uzbekistan	49 kg	72	~~75~~	75	4	92	95	~~97~~	5	170	4
Islamic Solidarity Games
2022	Konya, Turkey	45 kg	66	69	71	1st place, gold medalist(s)	85	88	~~91~~	1st place, gold medalist(s)	159	1st place, gold medalist(s)
Asian Championships
2023	Jinju, South Korea	45 kg	68	~~71~~	71	3rd place, bronze medalist(s)	86	~~88~~	88	3rd place, bronze medalist(s)	159	3rd place, bronze medalist(s)
2022	Manama, Bahrain	45 kg	68	71	~~73~~	2nd place, silver medalist(s)	~~87~~	88	91	1st place, gold medalist(s)	162	2nd place, silver medalist(s)
SEA Games
2022	Hanoi, Vietnam	45 kg	68	70	72	—N/a	88	90	~~92~~	—N/a	162	3rd place, bronze medalist(s)
