= Natasya Beteyob =

Indonesian weightlifter (born 2000)

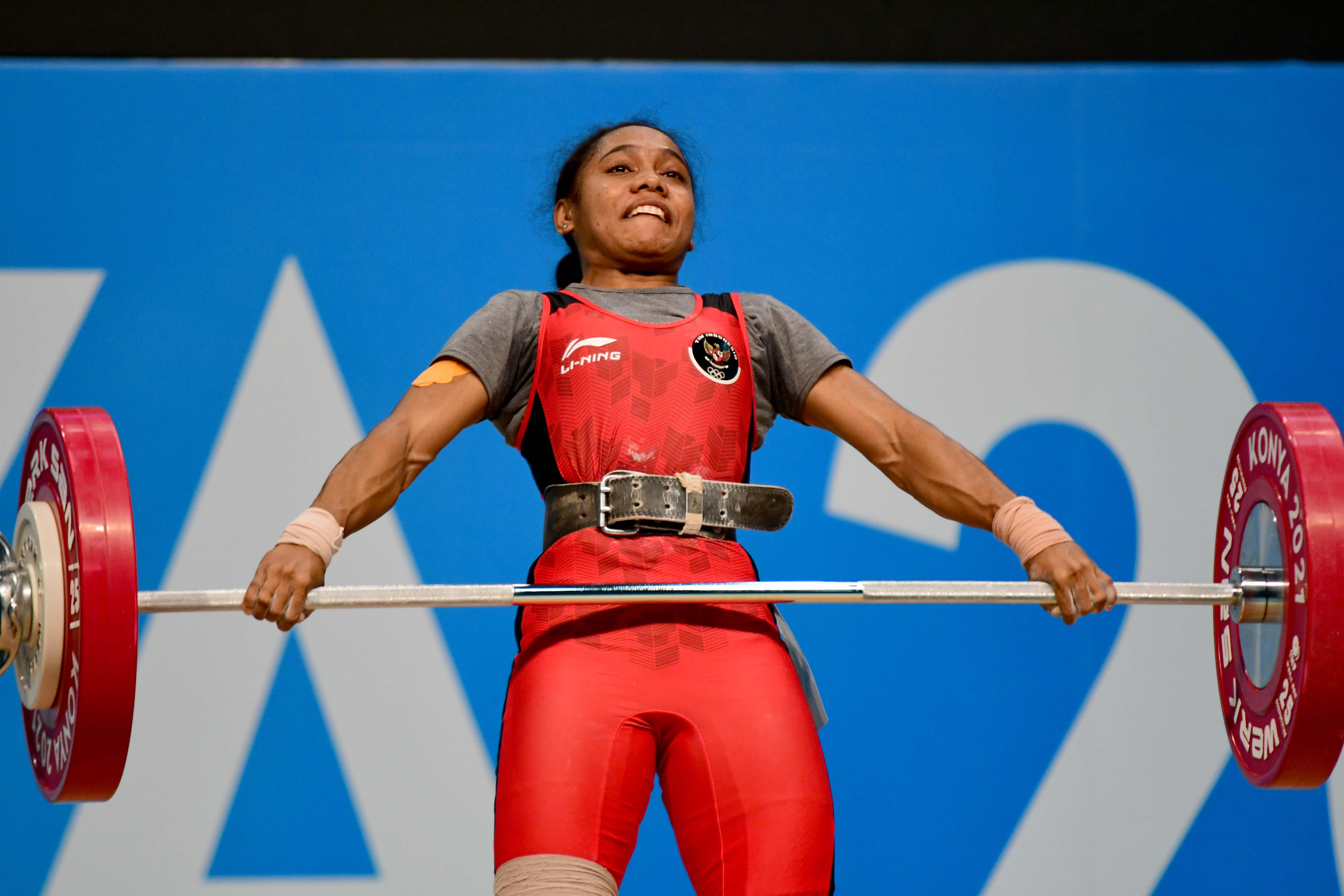
- Natasya Beteyob at the 2021 Islamic Solidarity Games

Personal information
- Born: 10 September 2000 (age 26)

Sport
- Country: Indonesia
- Sport: Weightlifting
- Weight class: 55 kg; 59 kg
Medal record
Women's weightlifting
Representing Indonesia
Asian Championships
Bronze medal – third place	2022 Manama	59 kg
Bronze medal – third place	2024 Tashkent	59 kg
Islamic Solidarity Games
Gold medal – first place	2021 Konya	55 kg C&J
Gold medal – first place	2021 Konya	55 kg T
Silver medal – second place	2021 Konya	55 kg S
SEA Games
Silver medal – second place	2025 Thailand	58 kg
Bronze medal – third place	2021 Vietnam	55 kg

Natasya Beteyob, sometimes written as Natasha Beteyob (born 10 September 2000) is an Indonesian weightlifter. She won the gold medal in the women's 55 kg event at the 2021 Islamic Solidarity Games held in Konya, Turkey. She won the bronze medal in the women's 55 kg event at the 2021 SEA Games held in Hanoi, Vietnam.

She won the bronze medal in the women's 59 kg event at the 2022 Asian Weightlifting Championships held in Manama, Bahrain. She competed in the women's 59 kg event at the 2022 World Weightlifting Championships held in Bogotá, Colombia.

In 2023, she competed in the women's 59 kg event at the World Weightlifting Championships held in Riyadh, Saudi Arabia.

== Achievements ==
Year	Venue	Weight	Snatch (kg)				Clean & Jerk (kg)				Total	Rank
Year	Venue	Weight	1	2	3	Rank	1	2	3	Rank	Total	Rank
Islamic Solidarity Games
2022	Konya, Turkey	55 kg	~~84~~	~~84~~	84	2nd place, silver medalist(s)	102	104	111	1st place, gold medalist(s)	195	1st place, gold medalist(s)
SEA Games
2022	Hanoi, Vietnam	55 kg	84	~~88~~	~~88~~	—N/a	104	~~106~~	~~110~~	—N/a	188	3rd place, bronze medalist(s)
