= Tursunoy Jabborova =

Uzbekistani weightlifter (born 2002)

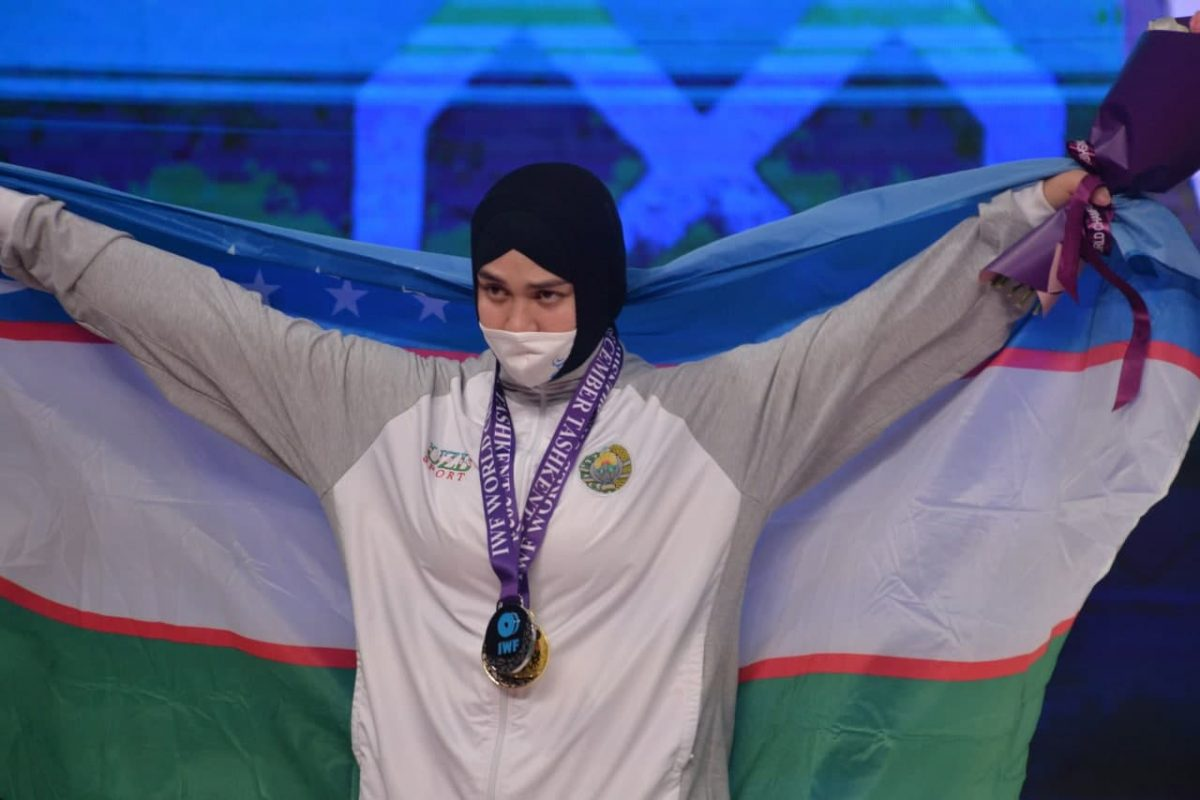
- Jabborova in 2021

Personal information
- Born: 4 March 2002 (age 24)

Sport
- Country: Uzbekistan
- Sport: Weightlifting
- Weight class: 87 kg; +87 kg
Medal record
Women's weightlifting
Representing Uzbekistan
World Championships
Silver medal – second place	2021 Tashkent	87 kg
Bronze medal – third place	2022 Bogotá	87 kg
Asian Championships
Bronze medal – third place	2022 Manama	87 kg
Islamic Solidarity Games
Gold medal – first place	2021 Konya	87 kg
Junior World Championships
Gold medal – first place	2021 Tashkent	87 kg
Gold medal – first place	2022 Heraklion	87 kg
Bronze medal – third place	2018 Tashkent	75 kg
Youth World Championships
Silver medal – second place	2019 Las Vegas	81 kg

Tursunoy Jabborova (Uzbek Cyrillic: Турсуной Жабборова, born 4 March 2002) is an Uzbekistani weightlifter. She won the silver medal in the women's 87 kg event at the 2021 World Weightlifting Championships held in Tashkent, Uzbekistan, and the bronze medal at the 2022 edition held in Bogotá, Colombia. She is also a three-time medalist, including two gold medals, at the Junior World Weightlifting Championships. Jabborova represented Uzbekistan at the 2024 Summer Olympics in Paris, France.

== Career ==
Jabborova won the bronze medal in the women's 75 kg event at the Junior World Weightlifting Championships held in Tashkent, Uzbekistan. A few months later, she competed in the women's 81 kg event at the 2018 World Weightlifting Championships held in Ashgabat, Turkmenistan.

In 2019, Jabborova won the silver medal in the women's 81 kg event at the 2019 Youth World Weightlifting Championships held in Las Vegas, United States. She also won the silver medal in the women's 76 kg snatch event at the 6th International Qatar Cup held in Doha, Qatar.

In 2021, Jabborova won the gold medal in the women's 87 kg event at the Junior World Weightlifting Championships held in Tashkent, Uzbekistan. She also won the gold medal in her event at the 2022 Junior World Weightlifting Championships held in Heraklion, Greece.

Jabborova won the gold medal in the women's 87 kg event at the 2021 Islamic Solidarity Games held in Konya, Turkey. She won the bronze medal in her event at the 2022 Asian Weightlifting Championships held in Manama, Bahrain. She won the bronze medal in the women's 87 kg event at the 2022 World Weightlifting Championships held in Bogotá, Colombia.

Jabborova competed in the women's +87 kg event at the 2023 Asian Weightlifting Championships held in Jinju, South Korea. A few months later, she competed in her event at the 2023 World Weightlifting Championships held in Riyadh, Saudi Arabia.

In February 2024, she won the bronze medal in the Snatch in her event at the Asian Weightlifting Championships held in Tashkent, Uzbekistan. In August 2024, she finished in 10th place in the women's +81 kg event at the 2024 Summer Olympics held in Paris, France.

== Achievements ==
Year	Venue	Weight	Snatch (kg)				Clean & Jerk (kg)				Total	Rank
Year	Venue	Weight	1	2	3	Rank	1	2	3	Rank	Total	Rank
Summer Olympics
2024	Paris, France	+81 kg	112	116	118	—N/a	133	~~138~~	~~138~~	—N/a	251	10
World Championships
2018	Ashgabat, Turkmenistan	81 kg	93	96	99	10	115	119	~~122~~	15	218	14
2021	Tashkent, Uzbekistan	87 kg	108	111	113	1st place, gold medalist(s)	127	131	~~134~~	4	244	2nd place, silver medalist(s)
2022	Bogotá, Colombia	87 kg	107	110	112	2nd place, silver medalist(s)	125	129	~~131~~	8	241	3rd place, bronze medalist(s)
2023	Riyadh, Saudi Arabia	+87 kg	110	~~114~~	~~116~~	8	~~135~~	135	141	10	251	10
IWF World Cup
2024	Phuket, Thailand	+87 kg	115	119	~~121~~	5	~~138~~	~~138~~	~~142~~	—	—	—
Asian Games
2023	Hangzhou, China	+87 kg	110	115	118	—N/a	135	142	~~145~~	—N/a	260	5
Asian Championships
2021	Tashkent, Uzbekistan	87 kg	105	109	~~112~~	4	127	~~132~~	132	4	241	4
2022	Manama, Bahrain	87 kg	103	107	112	2nd place, silver medalist(s)	123	127	130	4	242	3rd place, bronze medalist(s)
2023	Jinju, South Korea	+87 kg	107	112	115	5	130	135	140	6	255	6
2024	Tashkent, Uzbekistan	+87 kg	112	116	~~120~~	3rd place, bronze medalist(s)	136	142	~~145~~	4	258	4
2025	Jiangshan, China	87 kg	104	108	~~110~~	3rd place, bronze medalist(s)	121	~~126~~	—	8	229	8
Islamic Solidarity Games
2021	Konya, Turkey	87 kg	102	106	109	1st place, gold medalist(s)	122	126	~~130~~	1st place, gold medalist(s)	235	1st place, gold medalist(s)
