= Weightlifting at the 2021 Islamic Solidarity Games =

- Venue: TÜYAP Konya International Fair Center
- Dates: 11–15 August 2022
- Competitors: 147 from 24 nations

The weightlifting tournament at the 2021 Islamic Solidarity Games in Konya was held between 11–15 August 2022. The weightlifting competition took place at TÜYAP Konya International Fair Center in Konya.

The Games were originally scheduled to take place from 20 to 29 August 2021 in Konya, Turkey. In May 2020, the Islamic Solidarity Sports Federation (ISSF), who are responsible for the direction and control of the Islamic Solidarity Games, postponed the games as the 2020 Summer Olympics were postponed to July and August 2021, due to the global COVID-19 pandemic.

== Medal table ==
Rank	Nation	Gold	Silver	Bronze	Total
1	Uzbekistan	15	3	6	24
2	Indonesia	12	7	10	29
3	Turkey	11	11	6	28
4	Iran	9	6	12	27
5	Kazakhstan	8	15	3	26
6	Turkmenistan	3	4	6	13
7	Saudi Arabia	1	6	4	11
8	Cameroon	1	3	1	5
9	Nigeria	0	2	1	3
10	Kyrgyzstan	0	1	7	8
11	Azerbaijan	0	1	3	4
12	Oman	0	1	0	1
13	Lebanon	0	0	1	1
Totals (13 entries)		60	60	60	180

== Medalists ==
=== Men ===
Event		Gold		Silver		Bronze	
– 55 kg	Snatch	Mansour Al-Saleem; Saudi Arabia	115 kg	Arli Chontey; Kazakhstan	114 kg	Satrio Adi Nugroho; Indonesia	110 kg
– 55 kg	Clean & Jerk	Arli Chontey; Kazakhstan	139 kg	Mansour Al-Saleem; Saudi Arabia	137 kg	Satrio Adi Nugroho; Indonesia	134 kg
– 55 kg	Total	Arli Chontey; Kazakhstan	253 kg	Mansour Al-Saleem; Saudi Arabia	252 kg	Satrio Adi Nugroho; Indonesia	244 kg
– 61 kg	Snatch	Ricko Saputra; Indonesia	128 kg	Seraj Al-Saleem; Saudi Arabia	123 kg	Ferdi Hardal; Turkey	122 kg
– 61 kg	Clean & Jerk	Ricko Saputra; Indonesia	163 kg	Seraj Al-Saleem; Saudi Arabia	154 kg	Otepbergen Aliyev; Kazakhstan	151 kg
– 61 kg	Total	Ricko Saputra; Indonesia	291 kg	Seraj Al-Saleem; Saudi Arabia	277 kg	Otepbergen Aliyev; Kazakhstan	271 kg
– 67 kg	Snatch	Adkhamjon Ergashev; Uzbekistan	141 kg	Mohammad Yasin; Indonesia	140 kg	Kaan Kahriman; Turkey	138 kg
– 67 kg	Clean & Jerk	Yusuf Fehmi Genç; Turkey	174 kg	Adkhamjon Ergashev; Uzbekistan	173 kg	Hafez Ghashghaei; Iran	172 kg
– 67 kg	Total	Adkhamjon Ergashev; Uzbekistan	314 kg	Doston Yokubov; Uzbekistan	305 kg	Yusuf Fehmi Genç; Turkey	305 kg
– 73 kg	Snatch	Rizki Juniansyah; Indonesia	150 kg	Alexey Churkin; Kazakhstan	145 kg	Abdulrahman Albeladi; Saudi Arabia	130 kg
– 73 kg	Clean & Jerk	Rizki Juniansyah; Indonesia	190 kg	Alexey Churkin; Kazakhstan	170 kg	Abdulrahman Albeladi; Saudi Arabia	166 kg
– 73 kg	Total	Rizki Juniansyah; Indonesia	340 kg	Alexey Churkin; Kazakhstan	315 kg	Abdulrahman Albeladi; Saudi Arabia	296 kg
– 81 kg	Snatch	Mukhammadkodir Toshtemirov; Uzbekistan	164 kg	Mirmostafa Javadi; Iran	163 kg	Hossein Soltani; Iran	158 kg
– 81 kg	Clean & Jerk	Mirmostafa Javadi; Iran	201 kg	Rahmat Erwin Abdullah; Indonesia	197 kg	Hossein Soltani; Iran	192 kg
– 81 kg	Total	Mirmostafa Javadi; Iran	364 kg	Rahmat Erwin Abdullah; Indonesia	355 kg	Mukhammadkodir Toshtemirov; Uzbekistan	354 kg
– 89 kg	Snatch	Sarvarbek Zafarjonov; Uzbekistan	167 kg	Assylzhan Bektay; Kazakhstan	162 kg	Emil Moldodosov; Kyrgyzstan	161 kg
– 89 kg	Clean & Jerk	Sarvarbek Zafarjonov; Uzbekistan	199 kg	Amur Al-Khanjari; Oman	194 kg	Emil Moldodosov; Kyrgyzstan	193 kg
– 89 kg	Total	Sarvarbek Zafarjonov; Uzbekistan	366 kg	Emil Moldodosov; Kyrgyzstan	354 kg	Assylzhan Bektay; Kazakhstan	353 kg
– 96 kg	Snatch	Reza Beiralvand; Iran	167 kg	Davranbek Hasanbayev; Turkmenistan	165 kg	Sunnatilla Usarov; Uzbekistan	164 kg
– 96 kg	Clean & Jerk	Reza Beiralvand; Iran	194 kg	Ali Alothman; Saudi Arabia	192 kg	Sunnatilla Usarov; Uzbekistan	190 kg
– 96 kg	Total	Reza Beiralvand; Iran	361 kg	Ali Alothman; Saudi Arabia	354 kg	Sunnatilla Usarov; Uzbekistan	349 kg
– 102 kg	Snatch	Rasoul Motamedi; Iran	177 kg	Dadash Dadashbayli; Azerbaijan	174 kg	Sharofiddin Amriddinov; Uzbekistan	172 kg
– 102 kg	Clean & Jerk	Rasoul Motamedi; Iran	223 kg	Artyom Antropov; Kazakhstan	222 kg	Bekdoolot Rasulbekov; Kyrgyzstan	216 kg
– 102 kg	Total	Rasoul Motamedi; Iran	400 kg	Artyom Antropov; Kazakhstan	386 kg	Bekdoolot Rasulbekov; Kyrgyzstan	385 kg
– 109 kg	Snatch	Ruslan Nurudinov; Uzbekistan	187 kg	Mehdi Karami; Iran	173 kg	Peyman Jan; Iran	166 kg
– 109 kg	Clean & Jerk	Ruslan Nurudinov; Uzbekistan	230 kg	Peyman Jan; Iran	216 kg	Mehdi Karami; Iran	207 kg
– 109 kg	Total	Ruslan Nurudinov; Uzbekistan	417 kg	Peyman Jan; Iran	382 kg	Mehdi Karami; Iran	380 kg
+ 109 kg	Snatch	Akbar Djuraev; Uzbekistan	200 kg	Hojamuhammet Toýçyýew; Turkmenistan	184 kg	Alireza Yousefi; Iran	181 kg
+ 109 kg	Clean & Jerk	Akbar Djuraev; Uzbekistan	246 kg	Alireza Yousefi; Iran	230 kg	Hojamuhammet Toýçyýew; Turkmenistan	225 kg
+ 109 kg	Total	Akbar Djuraev; Uzbekistan	446 kg	Alireza Yousefi; Iran	411 kg	Hojamuhammet Toýçyýew; Turkmenistan	409 kg

=== Women ===
Event		Gold		Silver		Bronz2	
– 45 kg	Snatch	Siti Nafisatul Hariroh; Indonesia	71 kg	Cansu Bektaş; Turkey	65 kg	Nazila Ismayilova; Azerbaijan	54 kg
– 45 kg	Clean & Jerk	Siti Nafisatul Hariroh; Indonesia	88 kg	Cansu Bektaş; Turkey	86 kg	Nazila Ismayilova; Azerbaijan	67 kg
– 45 kg	Total	Siti Nafisatul Hariroh; Indonesia	159 kg	Cansu Bektaş; Turkey	151 kg	Nazila Ismayilova; Azerbaijan	121 kg
– 49 kg	Snatch	Duygu Alıcı; Turkey	78 kg	Şaziye Erdoğan; Turkey	77 kg	Ýulduz Jumabaýewa; Turkmenistan	74 kg
– 49 kg	Clean & Jerk	Duygu Alıcı; Turkey	94 kg	Şaziye Erdoğan; Turkey	93 kg	Ýulduz Jumabaýewa; Turkmenistan	93 kg
– 49 kg	Total	Duygu Alıcı; Turkey	172 kg	Şaziye Erdoğan; Turkey	170 kg	Ýulduz Jumabaýewa; Turkmenistan	167 kg
– 55 kg	Snatch	Kristina Şermetowa; Turkmenistan	89 kg	Natasya Beteyob; Indonesia	84 kg	Poupak Basami; Iran	71 kg
– 55 kg	Clean & Jerk	Natasya Beteyob; Indonesia	111 kg	Kristina Şermetowa; Turkmenistan	105 kg	Poupak Basami; Iran	94 kg
– 55 kg	Total	Natasya Beteyob; Indonesia	195 kg	Kristina Şermetowa; Turkmenistan	194 kg	Poupak Basami; Iran	165 kg
– 59 kg	Snatch	Zulfiya Chinshanlo; Kazakhstan	95 kg	Adijat Olarinoye; Nigeria	92 kg	Cansel Özkan; Turkey	88 kg
– 59 kg	Clean & Jerk	Zulfiya Chinshanlo; Kazakhstan	125 kg	Nelly; Indonesia	111 kg	Adijat Olarinoye; Nigeria	110 kg
– 59 kg	Total	Zulfiya Chinshanlo; Kazakhstan	220 kg	Adijat Olarinoye; Nigeria	202 kg	Nelly; Indonesia	197 kg
– 64 kg	Snatch	Tsabitha Alfiah Ramadhani; Indonesia	98 kg	Nuray Güngör; Turkey	97 kg	Mina Alexa Marie; Lebanon	85 kg
– 64 kg	Clean & Jerk	Nuray Güngör; Turkey	121 kg	Berfin Altun; Turkey	118 kg	Tsabitha Alfiah Ramadhani; Indonesia	116 kg
– 64 kg	Total	Nuray Güngör; Turkey	218 kg	Tsabitha Alfiah Ramadhani; Indonesia	214 kg	Berfin Altun; Turkey	202 kg
– 71 kg	Snatch	Gülnabat Kadyrowa; Turkmenistan	107 kg	Aysel Özkan; Turkey	95 kg	Restu Anggi; Indonesia	90 kg
– 71 kg	Clean & Jerk	Aysel Özkan; Turkey	121 kg	Restu Anggi; Indonesia	120 kg	Gülnabat Kadyrowa; Turkmenistan	118 kg
– 71 kg	Total	Gülnabat Kadyrowa; Turkmenistan	225 kg	Aysel Özkan; Turkey	216 kg	Restu Anggi; Indonesia	210 kg
– 76 kg	Snatch	Dilara Uçan; Turkey	99 kg	Aray Nurlybekova; Kazakhstan	94 kg	Nigora Suvonova; Uzbekistan	93 kg
– 76 kg	Clean & Jerk	Jeanne Gaëlle Eyenga; Cameroon	124 kg	Aray Nurlybekova; Kazakhstan	121 kg	Dilara Uçan; Turkey	121 kg
– 76 kg	Total	Dilara Uçan; Turkey	220 kg	Aray Nurlybekova; Kazakhstan	215 kg	Jeanne Gaëlle Eyenga; Cameroon	214 kg
– 81 kg	Snatch	Seyedehelham Hosseini; Iran	100 kg	Dilara Narin; Turkey	99 kg	Rigina Adashbaeva; Uzbekistan	99 kg
– 81 kg	Clean & Jerk	Dilara Narin; Turkey	130 kg	Aisha Omarova; Kazakhstan	128 kg	Seyedehelham Hosseini; Iran	123 kg
– 81 kg	Total	Dilara Narin; Turkey	229 kg	Aisha Omarova; Kazakhstan	226 kg	Seyedehelham Hosseini; Iran	223 kg
– 87 kg	Snatch	Tursunoy Jabborova; Uzbekistan	109 kg	Clementine Meukeugni; Cameroon	101 kg	Kanymzhan Almazbek Kyzy; Kyrgyzstan	76 kg
– 87 kg	Clean & Jerk	Tursunoy Jabborova; Uzbekistan	126 kg	Clementine Meukeugni; Cameroon	110 kg	Kanymzhan Almazbek Kyzy; Kyrgyzstan	95 kg
– 87 kg	Total	Tursunoy Jabborova; Uzbekistan	235 kg	Clementine Meukeugni; Cameroon	211 kg	Kanymzhan Almazbek Kyzy; Kyrgyzstan	171 kg
+ 87 kg	Snatch	Aizada Muptilda; Kazakhstan	116 kg	Lyubov Kovalchuk; Kazakhstan	114 kg	Nurul Akmal; Indonesia	113 kg
+ 87 kg	Clean & Jerk	Aizada Muptilda; Kazakhstan	150 kg	Lyubov Kovalchuk; Kazakhstan	147 kg	Nurul Akmal; Indonesia	142 kg
+ 87 kg	Total	Aizada Muptilda; Kazakhstan	266 kg	Lyubov Kovalchuk; Kazakhstan	261 kg	Nurul Akmal; Indonesia	255 kg

== Participating nations ==
A total of 147 athletes from 24 nations competed in weightlifting at the 2021 Islamic Solidarity Games:

- Algeria (2)
- Azerbaijan (10)
- Bahrain (1)
- Bangladesh (2)
- Cameroon (7)
- Indonesia (12)
- Iran (17)
- Jordan (1)
- Kazakhstan (14)
- Kyrgyzstan (4)
- Lebanon (1)
- Nigeria (2)
- Oman (2)
- Pakistan (3)
- Saudi Arabia (12)
- Sudan (4)
- Tajikistan (1)
- Tunisia (2)
- Turkey (20)
- Turkmenistan (11)
- Uganda (3)
- United Arab Emirates (4)
- Uzbekistan (11)
- Yemen (1)

== Gallery ==
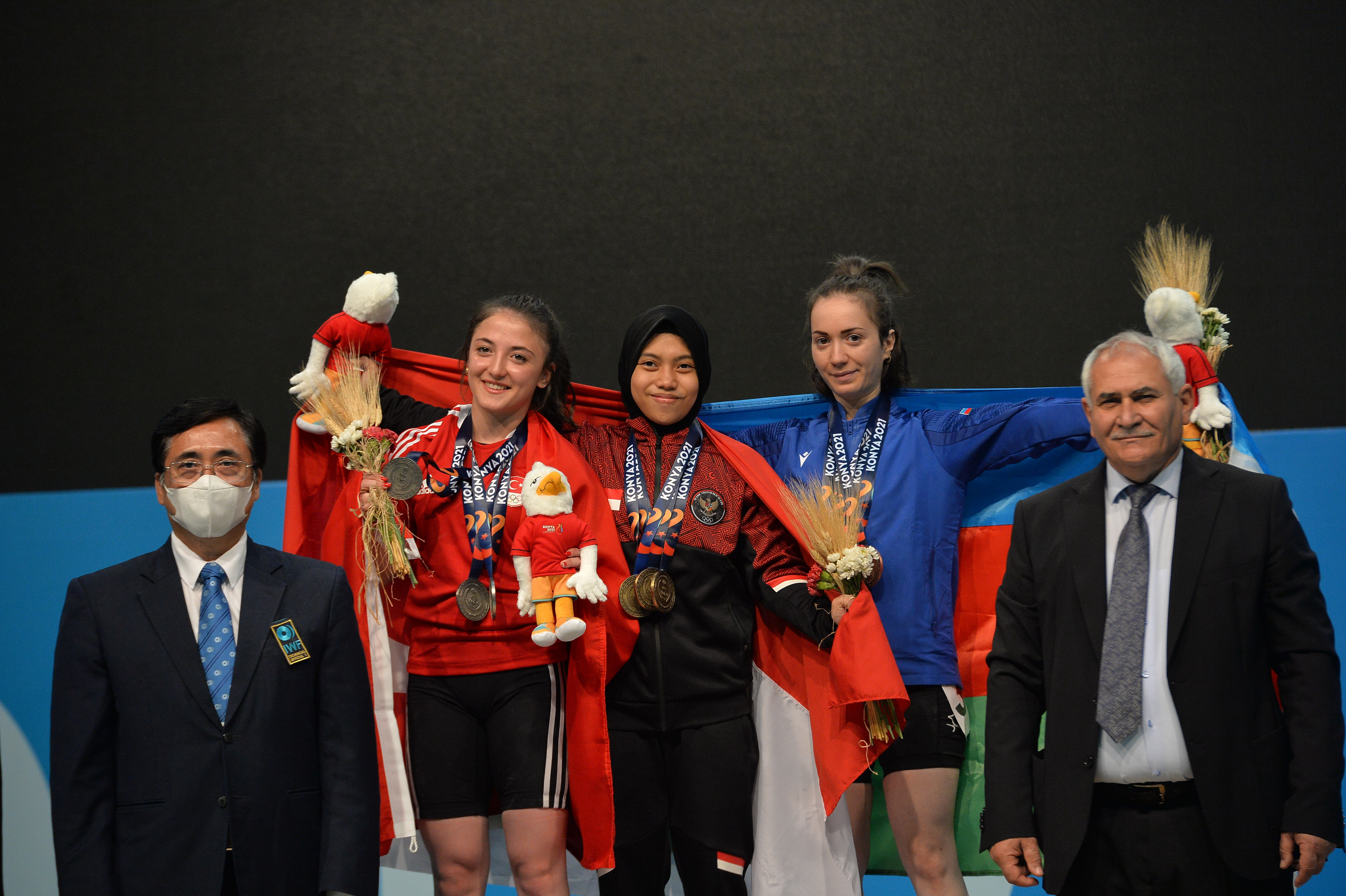
Women 45 kg medal ceremony

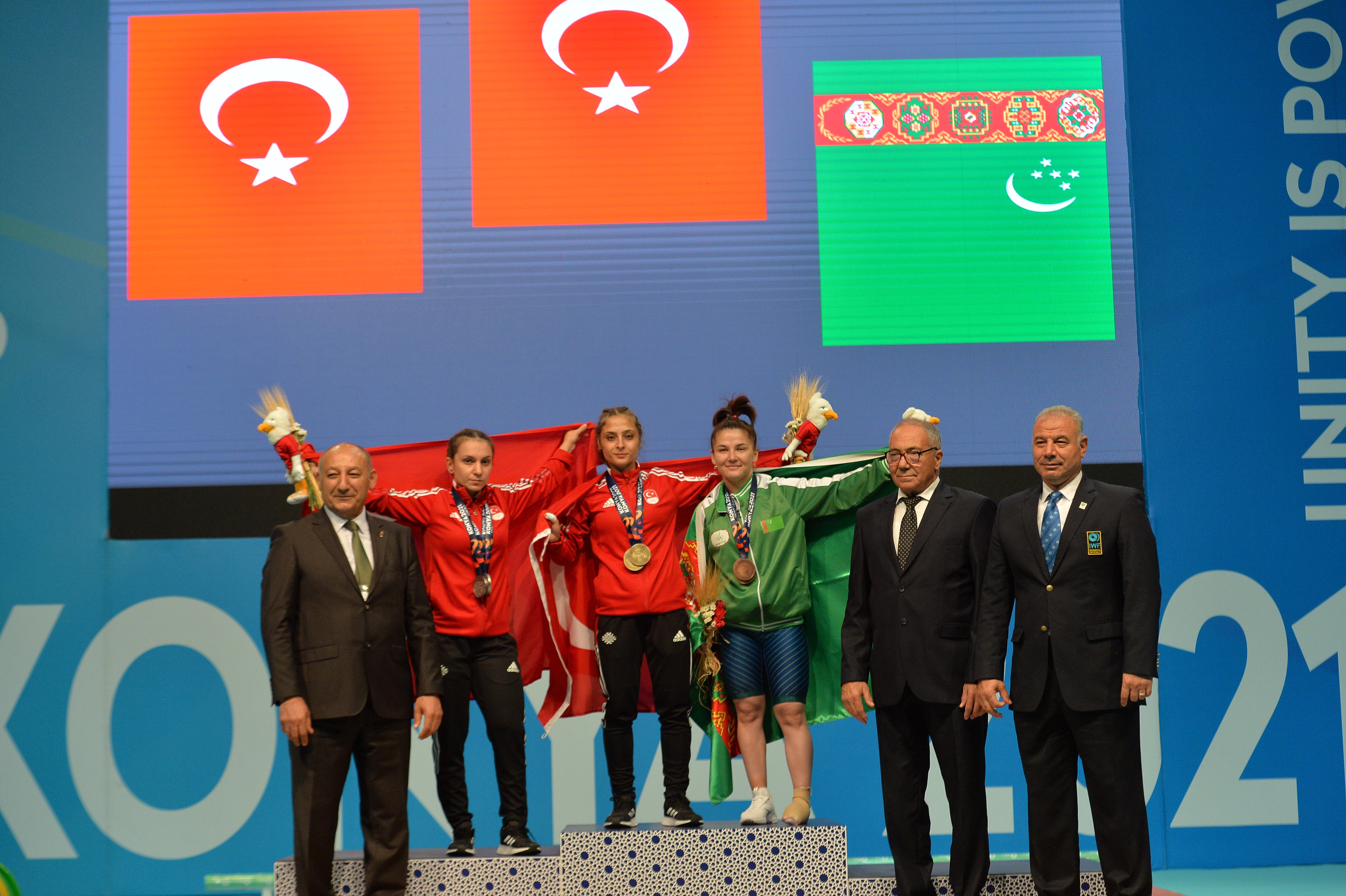
Women 49 kg medal ceremony

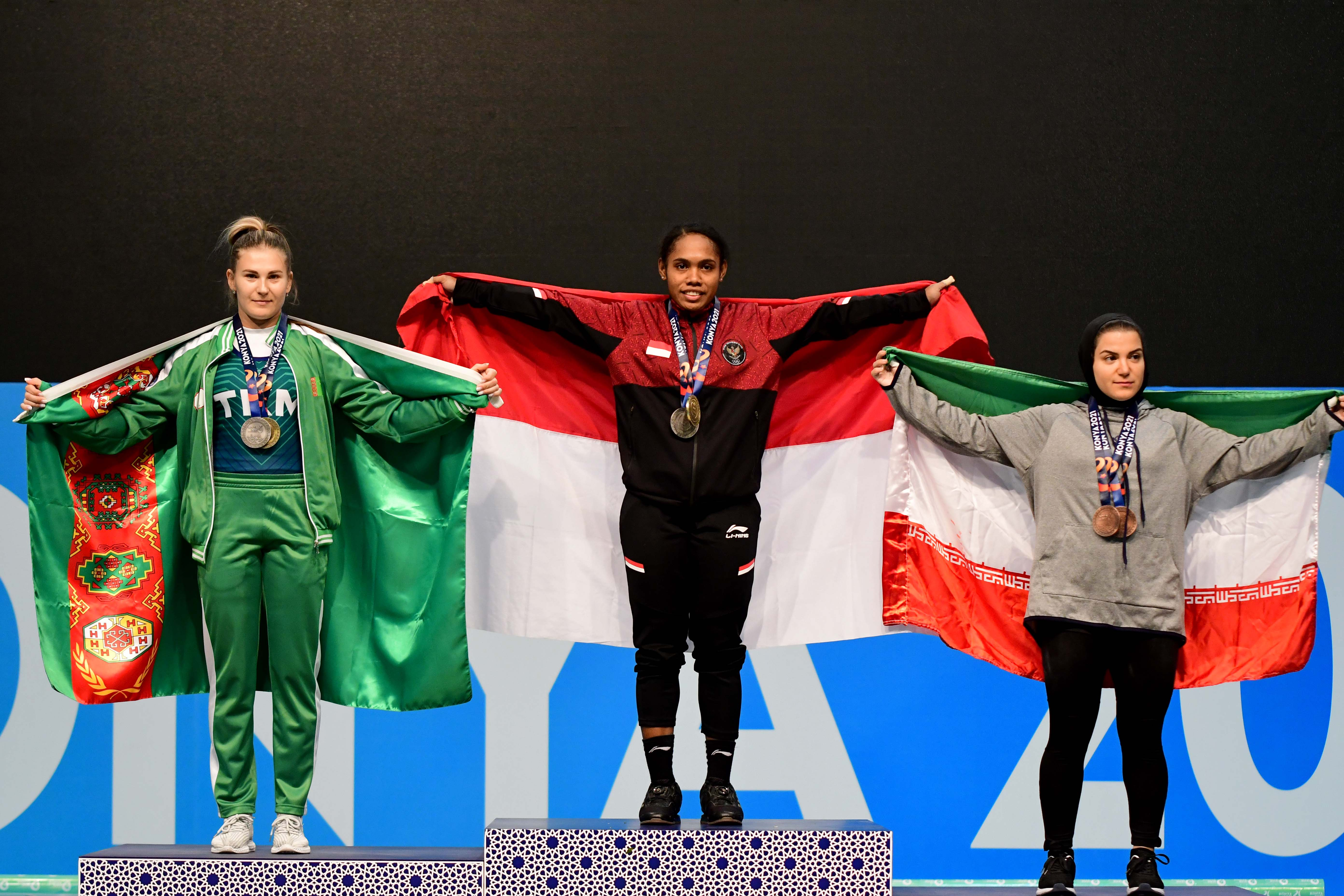
Women 55 kg medal ceremony

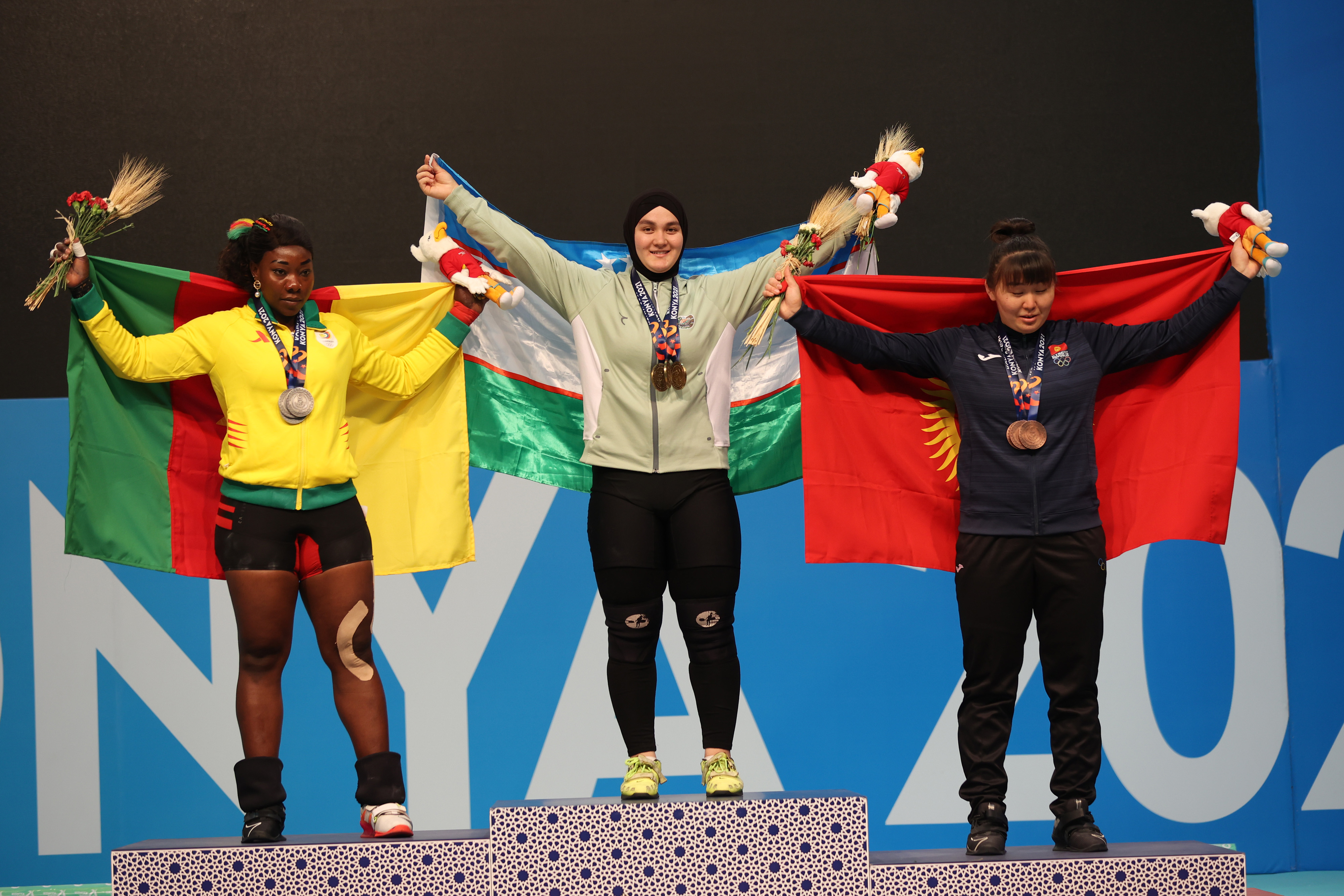
Women 87 kg medal ceremony

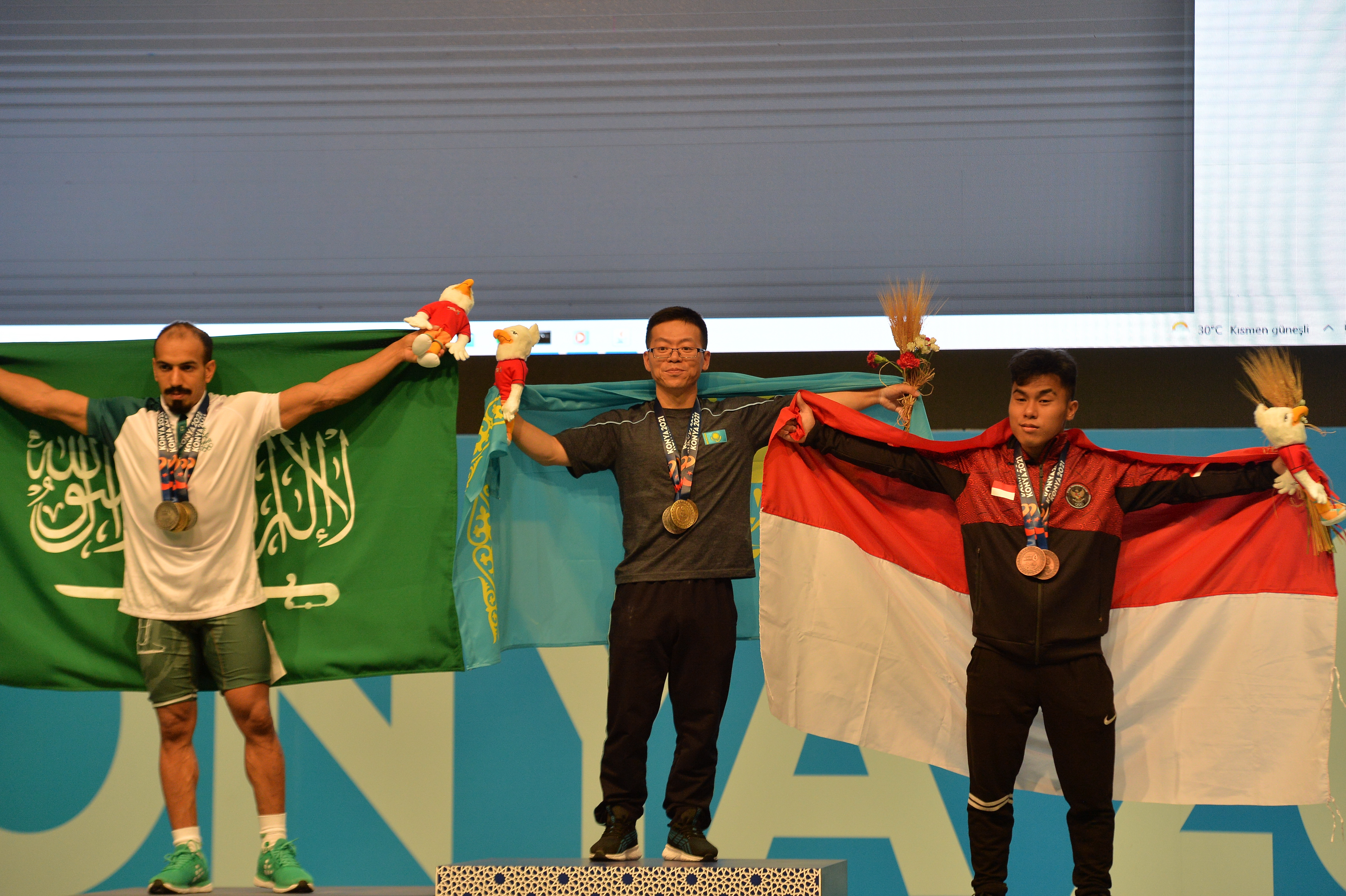
Men 55 kg medal ceremony

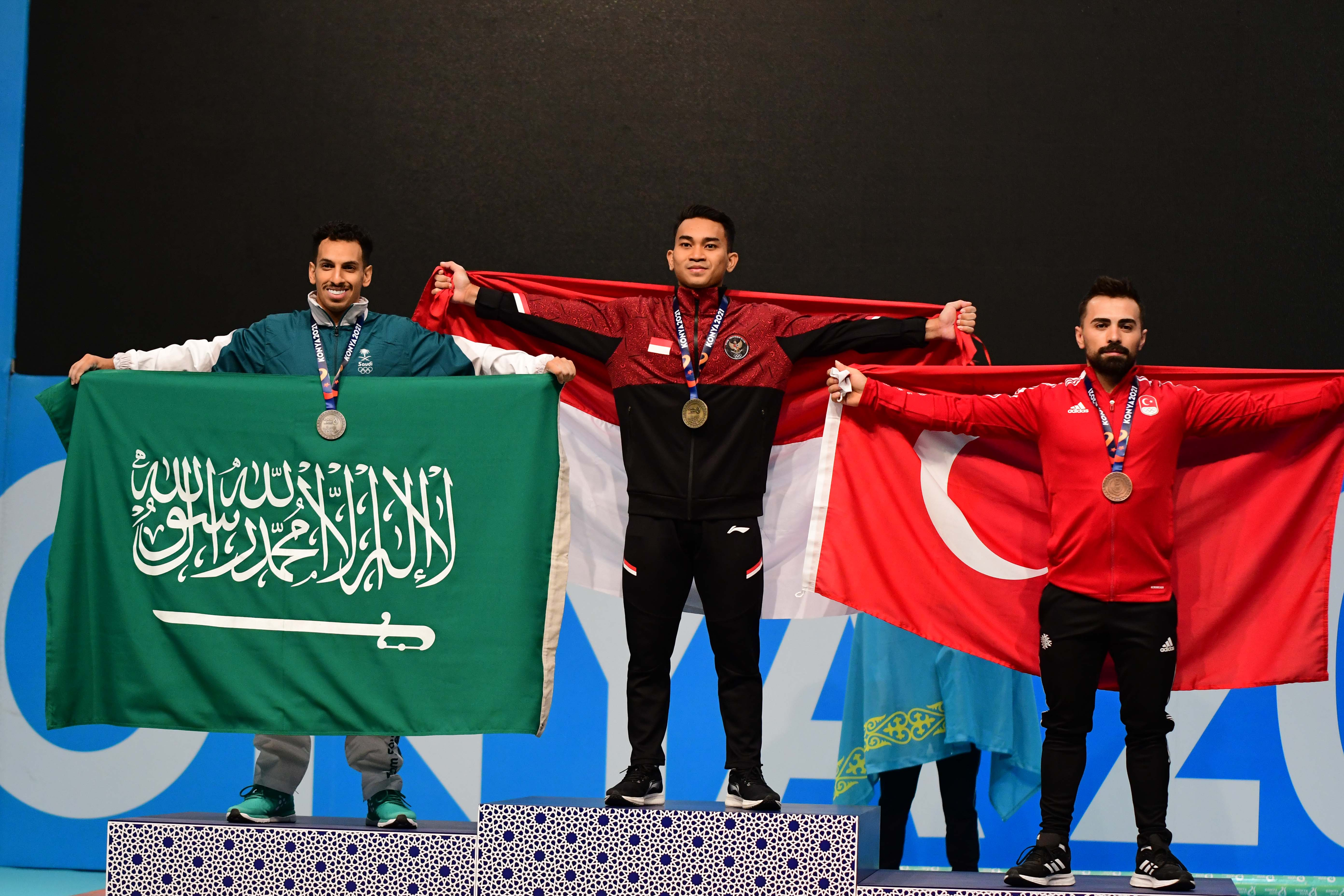
Men 61 kg medal ceremony

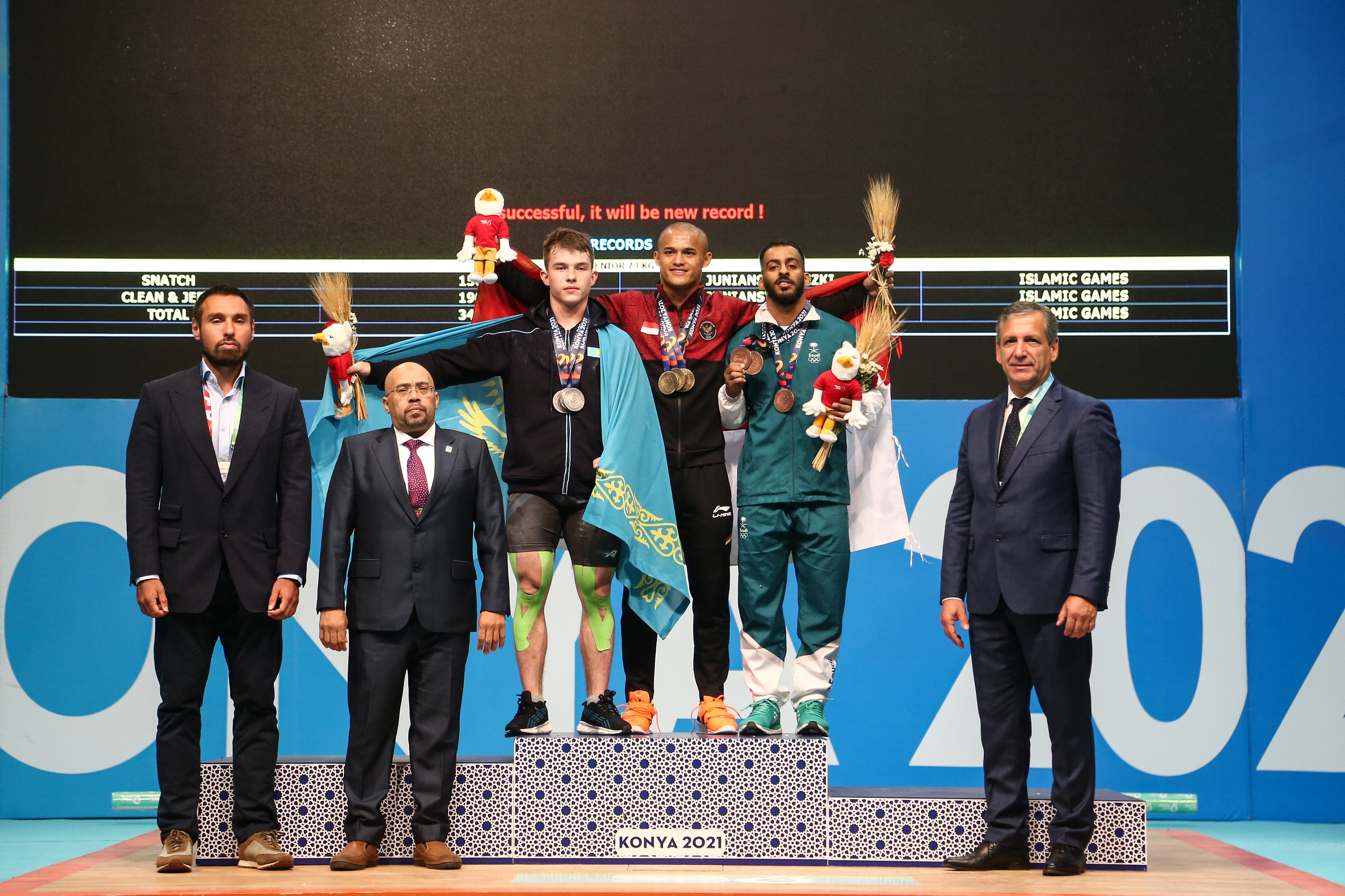
Men 73 kg medal ceremony

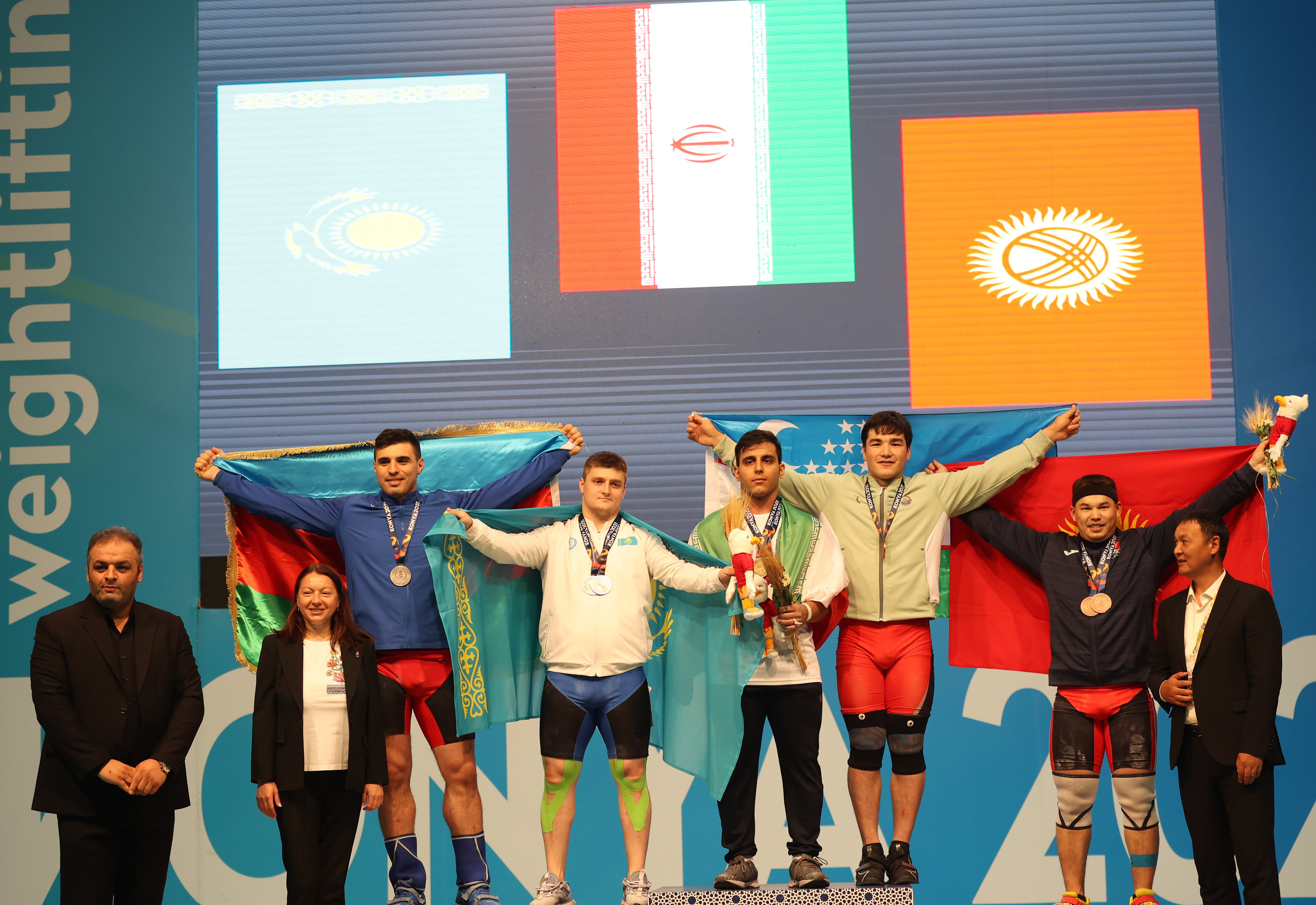
Men 102 kg medal ceremony

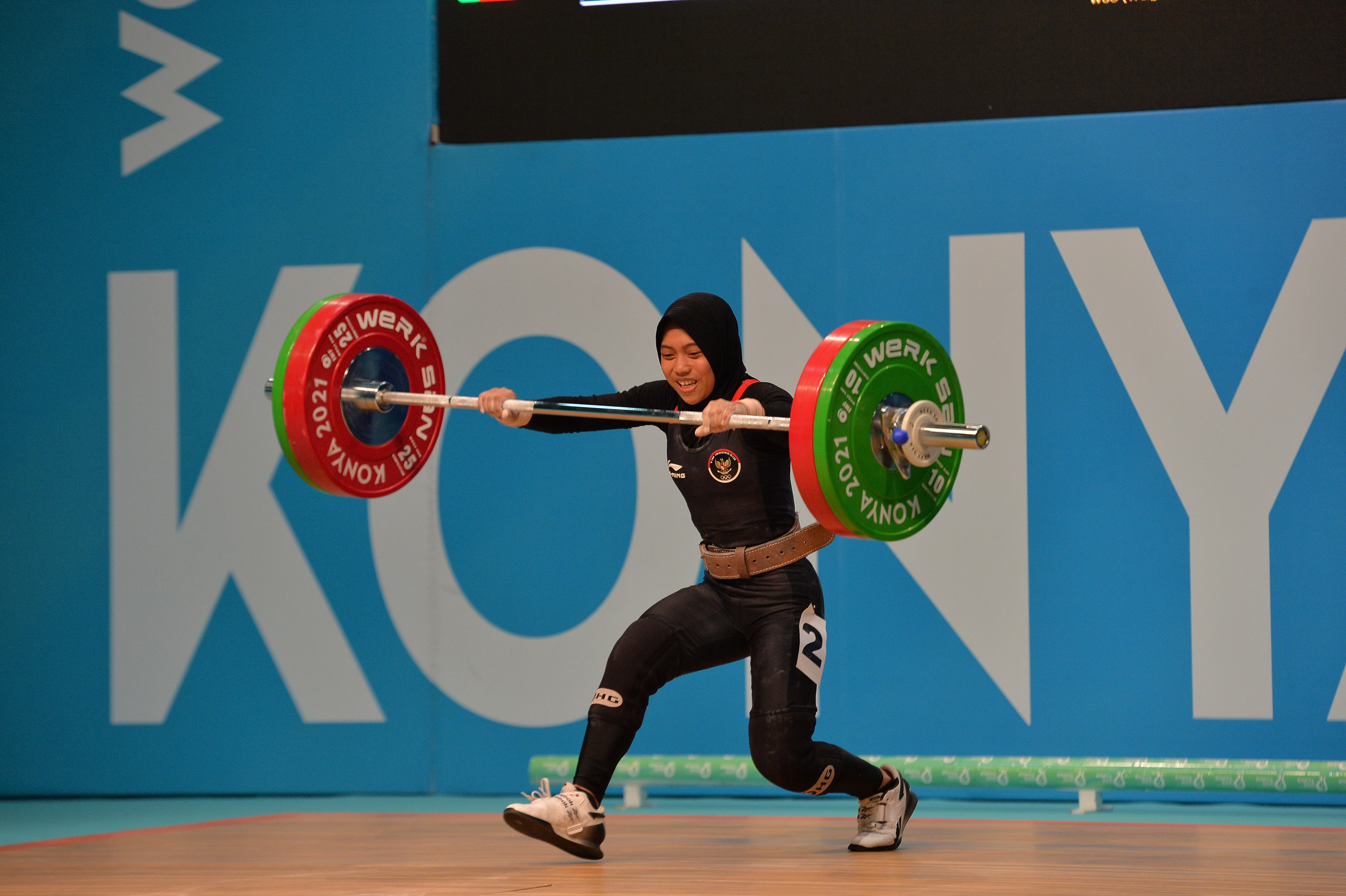
Women 45 kg

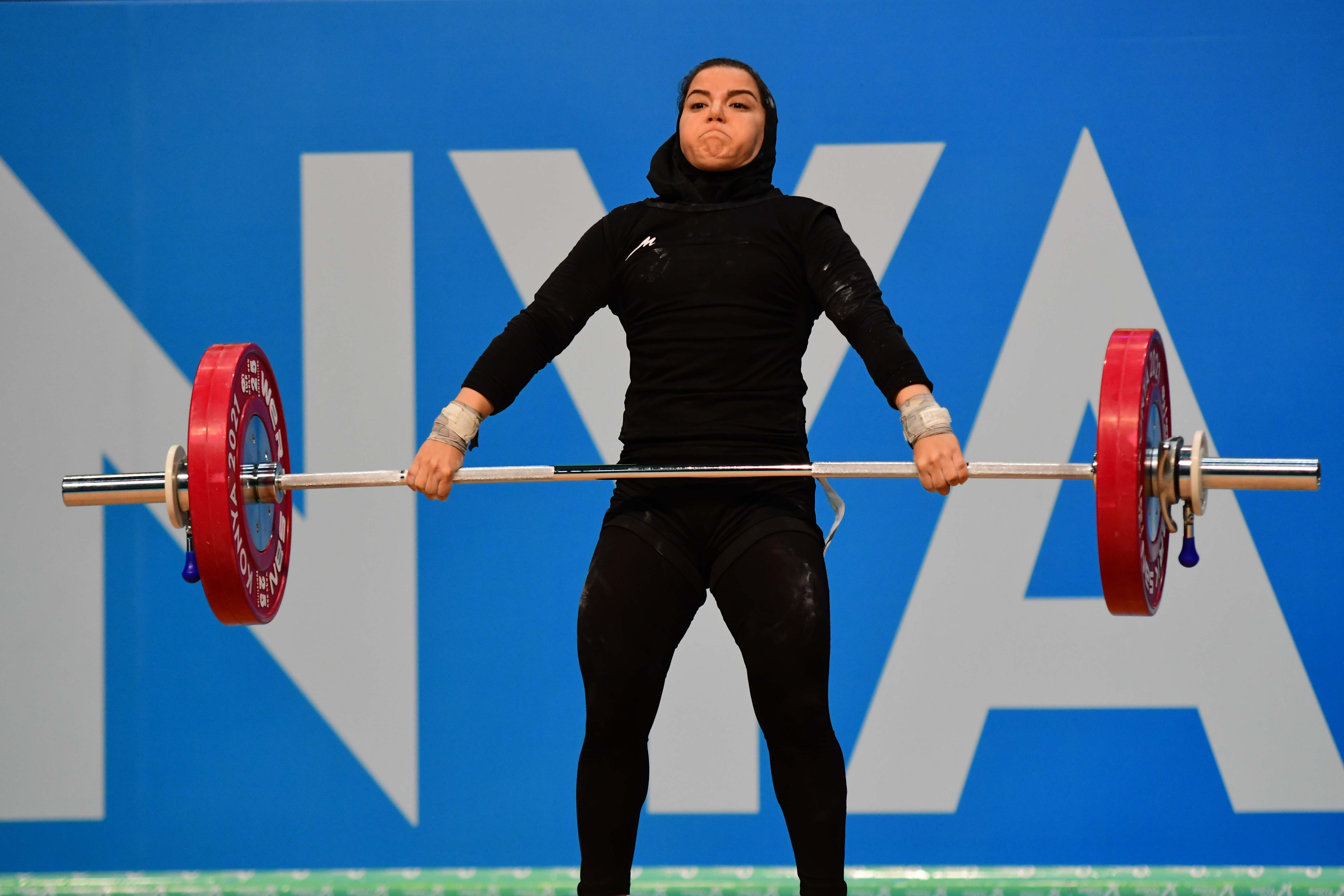
Women 55 kg

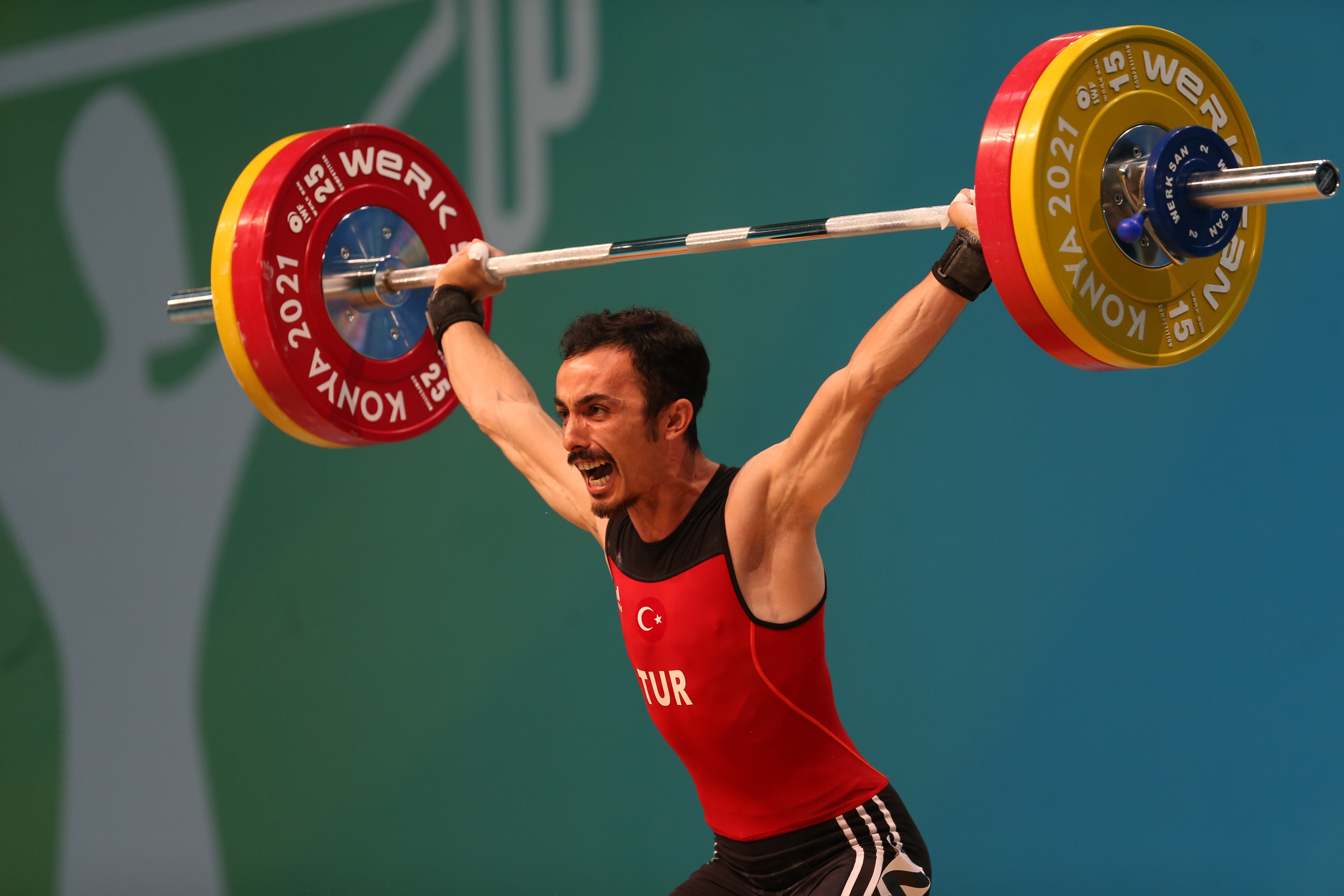
Men 55 kg

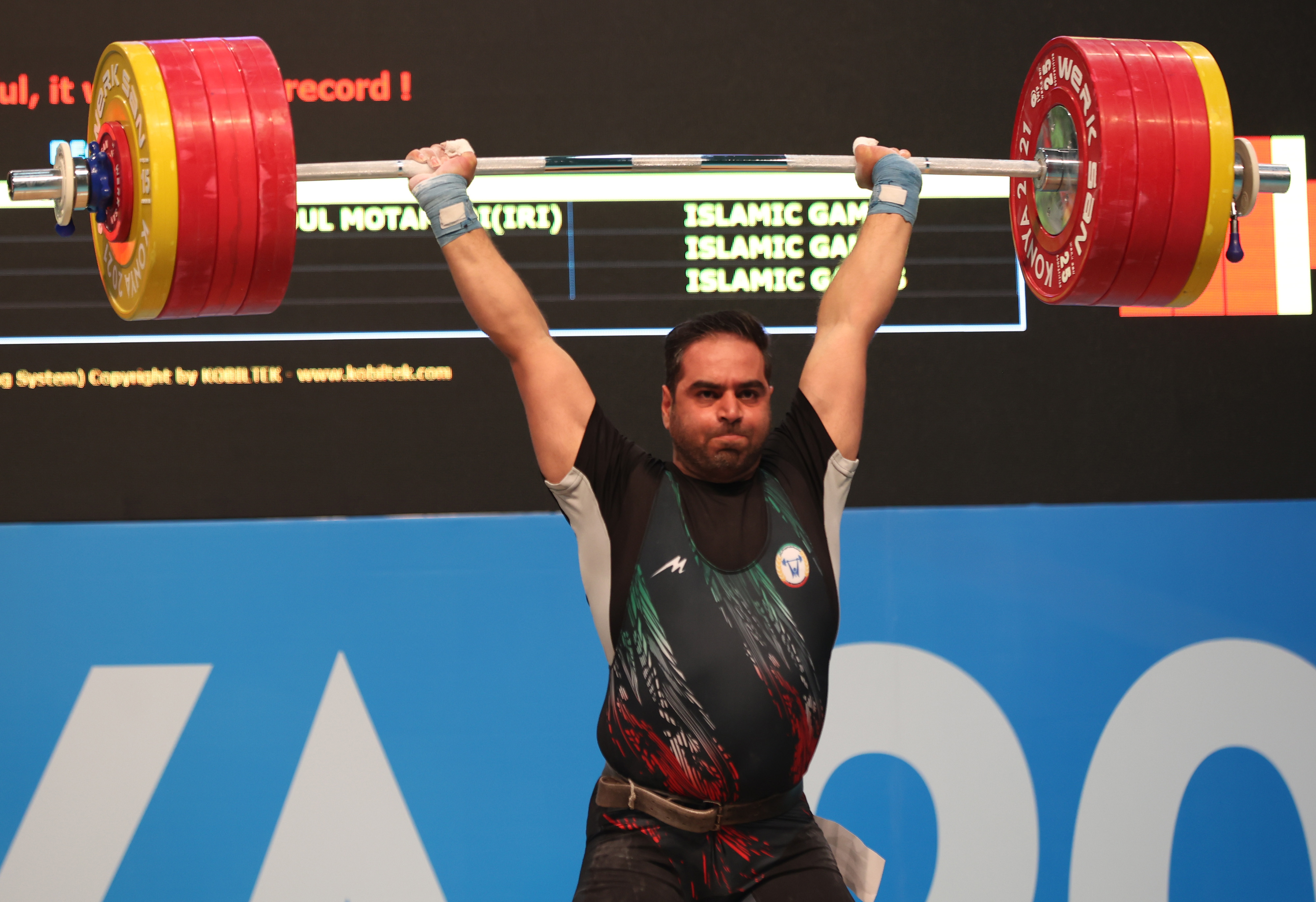
Men 102 kg
