= Gülnabat Kadyrowa =

Turkmenistan weightlifter (born 1994)

Gulnabat Kadyrova
Personal information
- Born: Gülnabat Kadyrowa; 14 June 1994 (age 32) Daşoguz Region, Turkmenistan
- Height: 1.69 m (5 ft 7 in)
- Weight: 69 kg (152 lb)

Sport
- Country: Turkmenistan
- Sport: Weightlifting
- Event: Women's 69 kg
Medal record
Women's weightlifting
Representing Turkmenistan
Islamic Solidarity Games
Gold medal – first place	2021 Konya	71 kg
Silver medal – second place	2017 Baku	69 kg
Asian Weightlifting Championships
Silver medal – second place	2021 Tashkent	71 kg

Gulnabat Kadyrova (Turkmen: Gülnabat Kadyrowa;born 14 June 1994) is a Turkmenistan weightlifter. She competed in the women's 69 kg event at the 2016 Summer Olympics.

== Career ==
She competed at the 2016 Summer Olympics in the 69 kg division. Gulnabat finished her performance with the result of 195 kg in the combined event, which was not only her personal achievement, but also a new national record for Turkmenistan.

She participated at the 2020 Asian Weightlifting Championships in Tashkent and won a silver medal in the 71 kg division.

== Major results ==
Year	Venue	Weight	Snatch (kg)				Clean & Jerk (kg)				Total	Rank
Year	Venue	Weight	1	2	3	Rank	1	2	3	Rank	Total	Rank
Representing Turkmenistan
Olympic Games
2016	Rio de Janeiro, Brazil	69 kg	85	90	~~94~~	13	~~100~~	~~105~~	105	14	195	13
World Championships
2018	Ashgabat, Turkmenistan	71 kg	94	96	~~98~~	9	112	~~115~~	115	16	211	11
Asian Games
2018	Jakarta, Indonesia	75 kg	90	~~93~~	93	7	~~115~~	115	118	6	211	6
Asian Championships
2021	Tashkent, Uzbekistan	72 kg	~~95~~	~~95~~	95	4	110	~~116~~	117	4	223	2nd place, silver medalist(s)
2017	Ashgabat, Turkmenistan	69 kg	~~95~~	~~95~~	95	4	110	~~116~~	117	4	212	4
2016	Tashkent, Uzbekistan	69 kg	85	90	92	3rd place, bronze medalist(s)	~~100~~	100	~~105~~	7	192	6
2015	Phuket, Thailand	63 kg	72	76	~~80~~	5	83	~~86~~	88	5	164	5
Islamic Solidarity Games
2017	Baku, Azerbaijan	69 kg	95	~~98~~	99	2	110	115	~~121~~	2	214	2nd place, silver medalist(s)
