= Weightlifting Federation of the Republic of Kazakhstan =

Governing body for weightlifting in Kazakhstan

- Sport: Weightlifting
- Jurisdiction: Kazakhstan
- Abbreviation: WFRK
- Founded: 1935
- Affiliation: IWF
- Headquarters: 2, Samal-1, Almaty
- President: Zhanat Tusupbekov

Official website
- wfrk.kz
- (Kazakhstan)

Weightlifting Federation of the Republic of Kazakhstan (WFRK; Kazakh: Қазақстан Республикасының ауыр атлетика федерациясы, Qazaqstan Respýblıkasynyń aýyr atletıka federatsııasy) is the governing body for the sport of weightlifting in Kazakhstan.

== History ==
Officially, the development of weightlifting in Kazakhstan begins in 1935. The first Republican championship held in 1937. In 1954, became the starting point for Kazakh weightlifters in the direction of establishing global and all-Union records.
