= Artyom Antropov =

Kazakhstani weightlifter (born 2000)

Personal information
- Full name: Артём Александрович Антропов
- Nationality: Kazakhstani
- Born: 23 January 2000 (age 26)
- Weight: 102 kg (225 lb)

Sport
- Country: Kazakhstan
- Weight class: 102 kg
Medal record
Men's weightlifting
Representing Kazakhstan
World Championships
Gold medal – first place	2024 Manama	102 kg
Asian Championships
Disqualified	2023 Jinju	109 kg
Silver medal – second place	2025 Jiangshan	102 kg
Bronze medal – third place	2020 Tashkent	102 kg
Bronze medal – third place	2022 Manama	96 kg
Islamic Solidarity Games
Silver medal – second place	2021 Konya	102 kg C&J
Silver medal – second place	2021 Konya	102 kg T
Junior World Championships
Silver medal – second place	2019 Suva	96 kg
Youth World Championships
Gold medal – first place	2017 Bangkok	85 kg

Artyom Alexandrovich Antropov (Russian: Артем Александрович Антропов; born 23 January 2000) is a Kazakh weightlifter, and Youth World Champion competing in the 96 kg and 102 kg categories. He won the gold medal in the 2017 Youth World Weightlifting Championships in the 85 kg event. He competed at the 2020 Asian Weightlifting Championships in the 102 kg category, and won a bronze medal in the total.

He won the bronze medal in his event at the 2022 Asian Weightlifting Championships held in Manama, Bahrain.
