= Tsabitha Alfiah Ramadani =

Indonesian weightlifter (born 2000)

Personal information
- Born: 23 December 2000 (age 25)
- Spouse: Rahmat Erwin Abdullah (m. 2025)

Sport
- Country: Indonesia
- Sport: Weightlifting
- Weight class: 64 kg; 71 kg
Medal record
Women's weightlifting
Representing Indonesia
Islamic Solidarity Games
Silver medal – second place	2021 Konya	64 kg
Southeast Asian Games
Gold medal – first place	2023 Cambodia	64 kg
Bronze medal – third place	2019 Philippines	71 kg
Bronze medal – third place	2021 Vietnam	64 kg

Tsabitha Alfiah Ramadani (born 23 December 2000) is an Indonesian weightlifter. She won the silver medal in the women's 64 kg event at the 2021 Islamic Solidarity Games held in Konya, Turkey. She is also a three-time medalist, including gold, at the SEA Games.

== Achievements ==
Year	Venue	Weight	Snatch (kg)				Clean & Jerk (kg)				Total	Rank
Year	Venue	Weight	1	2	3	Rank	1	2	3	Rank	Total	Rank
World Championships
2021	Tashkent, Uzbekistan	64 kg	92	~~98~~	~~98~~	9	105	110	~~115~~	10	202	9
2022	Bogotá, Colombia	71 kg	94	~~100~~	~~100~~	24	~~114~~	114	~~119~~	24	208	22
Islamic Solidarity Games
2021	Konya, Turkey	64 kg	92	96	98	1st place, gold medalist(s)	110	116	~~119~~	3rd place, bronze medalist(s)	214	2nd place, silver medalist(s)
