= Aizada Muptilda =

Kazakhstani weightlifter (born 1998)

Personal information
- Born: 23 April 1998 (age 28)

Sport
- Country: Kazakhstan
- Sport: Weightlifting
- Weight class: +87 kg
Medal record
Women's weightlifting
Representing Kazakhstan
Islamic Solidarity Games
Gold medal – first place	2021 Konya	+87 kg
Asian Championships
Gold medal – first place	2022 Manama	+87 kg
Bronze medal – third place	2020 Tashkent	+87 kg

Aizada Muptilda (born 23 April 1998) is a Kazakhstani weightlifter. She won the gold medal in the women's +87 kg event at the 2021 Islamic Solidarity Games held in Konya, Turkey. She also won the gold medal in her event at the 2022 Asian Weightlifting Championships held in Manama, Bahrain.

She competed in the women's +87 kg event at the 2018 World Weightlifting Championships held in Ashgabat, Turkmenistan. She also competed in the women's +87 kg event at the 2021 World Weightlifting Championships held in Tashkent, Uzbekistan.
