= 2024 World Weightlifting Championships – Men's 102 kg =

Men's 102 kg at the 2024 World Weightlifting Championships
- Venue: Weightlifting Marquee Venue
- Location: Manama, Bahrain
- Dates: 12 December
- Competitors: 24 from 21 nations
- Winning total: 400 kg

Medalists
gold medal	Artyom Antropov	Kazakhstan
silver medal	Fares El-Bakh	Qatar
bronze medal	Marcos Ruiz	Spain

The men's 102 kilograms competition at the 2024 World Weightlifting Championships was held on 13 December 2024.

== Schedule ==
Date	Time	Event
13 December 2024	14:30	Group B
13 December 2024	20:00	Group A

== Records ==
Prior to this competition, the existing world records were as follows.

World Record	Snatch	World Standard	191 kg	—	1 November 2018
World Record	Clean & Jerk	Liu Huanhua (CHN)	232 kg	Phuket , Thailand	8 April 2024
World Record	Total	Liu Huanhua (CHN)	413 kg	Phuket , Thailand	8 April 2024

== Results ==
Rank	Athlete	Group	Snatch (kg)				Clean & Jerk (kg)				Total
Rank	Athlete	Group	1	2	3	Rank	1	2	3	Rank	Total
1st place, gold medalist(s)	Artyom Antropov (KAZ)	A	165	170	~~173~~	12	220	227	230	1st place, gold medalist(s)	400
2nd place, silver medalist(s)	Fares El-Bakh (QAT)	A	171	174	~~177~~	7	~~222~~	222	225	2nd place, silver medalist(s)	399
3rd place, bronze medalist(s)	Marcos Ruiz (ESP)	A	175	180	183	1st place, gold medalist(s)	~~206~~	208	212	4	395
4	Aymen Bacha (TUN)	A	~~181~~	~~181~~	183	2nd place, silver medalist(s)	~~208~~	~~209~~	212	5	395
5	Jhonatan Rivas (COL)	A	175	~~180~~	~~181~~	6	208	213	~~218~~	3rd place, bronze medalist(s)	388
6	Alireza Nassiri (IRI)	A	~~174~~	174	~~181~~	8	210	~~222~~	~~222~~	6	384
7	Chen Po-jen (TPE)	B	172	176	~~180~~	5	202	~~209~~	~~211~~	10	378
8	Abolfazl Zare (IRI)	A	172	~~177~~	~~178~~	9	204	~~212~~	~~212~~	8	376
9	Tudor Bratu (MDA)	B	165	~~170~~	170	10	203	~~210~~	~~210~~	9	373
10	Jhohan Sanguino (VEN)	A	165	~~170~~	~~170~~	15	205	~~208~~	~~209~~	7	370
11	Ryan Sester (USA)	B	~~164~~	165	~~168~~	14	~~199~~	201	~~205~~	14	366
12	Artur Mugurdumov (ISR)	B	156	161	164	16	197	202	~~205~~	11	366
13	Liu Haojian (CHN)	B	163	~~166~~	~~168~~	17	~~202~~	202	~~205~~	12	365
14	Xavier Lusignan (CAN)	B	154	~~160~~	161	19	194	~~201~~	202	13	363
15	Yevhenii Yantsevych (UKR)	B	160	163	~~165~~	18	190	194	~~197~~	15	357
16	Josef Kolář (CZE)	B	155	~~159~~	~~160~~	20	186	~~191~~	~~192~~	17	341
17	Jacob Diakovasilis (DEN)	B	145	~~150~~	~~152~~	23	185	~~190~~	191	16	336
18	Irmantas Kačinskas (LTU)	B	~~150~~	152	~~160~~	21	175	181	~~190~~	18	333
19	Neilas Gineikis (LTU)	B	141	148	~~152~~	22	165	~~172~~	~~176~~	20	313
20	Dino Smajić (BIH)	B	135	~~143~~	143	24	160	166	~~170~~	19	309
—	Döwranbek Hasanbaýew (TKM)	B	182	~~188~~	~~188~~	3rd place, bronze medalist(s)	~~198~~	~~198~~	~~200~~	—	—
—	Şahzadbek Matýakubow (TKM)	A	175	180	~~184~~	4	~~210~~	~~216~~	~~217~~	—	—
—	Ara Aghanyan (ARM)	A	165	170	~~175~~	11	~~205~~	~~205~~	~~205~~	—	—
—	Yasser Usama (EGY)	A	~~166~~	166	~~171~~	13	~~207~~	~~207~~	~~210~~	—	—
