= List of Tunisian records in Olympic weightlifting =

The following are the national records in Olympic weightlifting in Tunisia. Records are maintained in each weight class for the snatch lift, clean and jerk lift, and the total for both lifts by the Fédération Tunisienne d'Haltérophilie.

== Current records ==
=== Men ===
Event	Record	Athlete	Date	Meet	Place	Ref
60 kg
Snatch	102 kg	Indris Werthi	8 November 2025	Islamic Solidarity Games	Riyadh, Saudi Arabia	
Clean & Jerk	122 kg	Indris Werthi	8 November 2025	Islamic Solidarity Games	Riyadh, Saudi Arabia	
Total	224 kg	Indris Werthi	8 November 2025	Islamic Solidarity Games	Riyadh, Saudi Arabia	
65 kg
Snatch						
Clean & Jerk						
Total						
71 kg
Snatch	135 kg	Ayoub Salem	9 November 2025	Islamic Solidarity Games	Riyadh, Saudi Arabia	
Clean & Jerk	161 kg	Ayoub Salem	9 November 2025	Islamic Solidarity Games	Riyadh, Saudi Arabia	
Total	296 kg	Ayoub Salem	9 November 2025	Islamic Solidarity Games	Riyadh, Saudi Arabia	
79 kg
Snatch						
Clean & Jerk						
Total						
88 kg
Snatch						
Clean & Jerk						
Total						
94 kg
Snatch						
Clean & Jerk						
Total						
110 kg
Snatch						
Clean & Jerk						
Total						
+110 kg
Snatch						
Clean & Jerk						
Total						

=== Women ===
Event	Record	Athlete	Date	Meet	Place	Ref
48 kg
Snatch						
Clean & Jerk						
Total						
53 kg
Snatch						
Clean & Jerk						
Total						
58 kg
Snatch						
Clean & Jerk						
Total						
63 kg
Snatch						
Clean & Jerk						
Total						
69 kg
Snatch						
Clean & Jerk						
Total						
77 kg
Snatch						
Clean & Jerk						
Total						
86 kg
Snatch						
Clean & Jerk						
Total						
+86 kg
Snatch						
Clean & Jerk						
Total						

== Historical records ==
=== Men (2018–2025) ===
Event	Record	Athlete	Date	Meet	Place	Ref
55 kg
Snatch	99 kg	Mahmoud Sajir Jebali	26 March 2023	Youth World Championships	Durrës, Albania	
Clean & Jerk	120 kg	Mahmoud Sajir Jebali	29 October 2022	African Championships	Cairo, Egypt	
Total	214 kg	Mahmoud Sajir Jebali	12 June 2022	Youth World Championships	León, Mexico	
61 kg
Snatch	120 kg	Amine Bouhijbha	5 December 2023	IWF Grand Prix	Doha, Qatar	
Clean & Jerk	151 kg	Amine Bouhijbha	27 January 2020	World Cup	Rome, Italy	
Total	267 kg	Amine Bouhijbha	27 January 2020	World Cup	Rome, Italy	
67 kg
Snatch	129 kg	Ayoub Salem	11 March 2024	African Games	Accra, Ghana	
Clean & Jerk	154 kg	Ayoub Salem	May 2023	African Championships	Tunis, Tunisia	
Total	280 kg	Ayoub Salem	May 2023	African Championships	Tunis, Tunisia	
73 kg
Snatch	153 kg	Karem Ben Hnia	27 August 2019	African Games	Rabat, Morocco	
Clean & Jerk	186 kg	Karem Ben Hnia	4 November 2018	World Championships	Ashgabat, Turkmenistan	
Total	338 kg	Karem Ben Hnia	26 April 2019	African Championships	Cairo, Egypt	
81 kg
Snatch	151 kg	Ramzi Bahloul	April 2019	African Championships	Cairo, Egypt	
Clean & Jerk	180 kg	Ramzi Bahloul	April 2019	African Championships	Cairo, Egypt	
Total	331 kg	Ramzi Bahloul	April 2019	African Championships	Cairo, Egypt	
89 kg
Snatch	149 kg	Wajih Tlili	April 2019	African Championships	Cairo, Egypt	
Clean & Jerk	175 kg	Rami Bahloul	April 2019	African Championships	Cairo, Egypt	
Total	322 kg	Wajih Tlili	April 2019	African Championships	Cairo, Egypt	
96 kg
Snatch	140 kg	Ayoub Dridi	30 October 2022	African Championships	Cairo, Egypt	
Clean & Jerk	176 kg	Ayoub Dridi	May 2023	African Championships	Tunis, Tunisia	
Total	313 kg	Ayoub Dridi	30 October 2022	African Championships	Cairo, Egypt	
102 kg
Snatch	183 kg	Aymen Bacha	13 December 2024	World Championships	Manama, Bahrain	
Clean & Jerk	210 kg	Aymen Bacha	4 July 2022	Mediterranean Games	Oran, Algeria	
Total	395 kg	Aymen Bacha	13 December 2024	World Championships	Manama, Bahrain	
109 kg
Snatch	177 kg	Aymen Bacha	3 August 2021	Olympic Games	Tokyo, Japan	
Clean & Jerk	211 kg	Aymen Bacha	3 August 2021	Olympic Games	Tokyo, Japan	
Total	388 kg	Aymen Bacha	3 August 2021	Olympic Games	Tokyo, Japan	
+109 kg
Snatch	151 kg	Ezzedine Lahamadi	14 March 2024	African Games	Accra, Ghana	
Clean & Jerk	180 kg	Ezzedine Lahamadi	May 2023	African Championships	Tunis, Tunisia	
Total	330 kg	Ezzedine Lahamadi	May 2023	African Championships	Tunis, Tunisia	

=== Women (2018–2025) ===
Event	Record	Athlete	Date	Meet	Place	Ref
45 kg
Snatch						
Clean & Jerk						
Total						
49 kg
Snatch	72 kg	Zohra Chihi	27 May 2021	African Championships	Nairobi, Kenya	
Clean & Jerk	92 kg	Zohra Chihi	27 May 2021	African Championships	Nairobi, Kenya	
Total	164 kg	Zohra Chihi	27 May 2021	African Championships	Nairobi, Kenya	
55 kg
Snatch	97 kg	Nouha Landoulsi	3 November 2018	World Championships	Ashgabat, Turkmenistan	
Clean & Jerk	114 kg	Nouha Landoulsi	3 November 2018	World Championships	Ashgabat, Turkmenistan	
Total	211 kg	Nouha Landoulsi	3 November 2018	World Championships	Ashgabat, Turkmenistan	
59 kg
Snatch	92 kg	Ghofrane Belkhir	15 May 2023	African Championships	Tunis, Tunisia	
Clean & Jerk	115 kg	Ghofrane Belkhir	2 July 2022	Mediterranean Games	Oran, Algeria	
Total	206 kg	Ghofrane Belkhir	2 July 2022	Mediterranean Games	Oran, Algeria	
64 kg
Snatch	92 kg	Chaima Rahmouni	12 March 2024	African Games	Accra, Ghana	
Clean & Jerk	111 kg	Chaima Rahmouni	12 March 2024	African Games	Accra, Ghana	
Total	203 kg	Chaima Rahmouni	12 March 2024	African Games	Accra, Ghana	
71 kg
Snatch	90 kg	Chaima Rahmouni	13 July 2023	Arab Games	Bordj El Kiffan, Algeria	
Clean & Jerk	116 kg	Jawaher Gasmi	12 March 2024	African Games	Accra, Ghana	
Total	203 kg	Chaima Rahmouni	11 September 2023	World Championships	Riyadh, Saudi Arabia	
76 kg
Snatch	78 kg	Zeineb Maghraoui	May 2023	African Championships	Tunis, Tunisia	
Clean & Jerk	101 kg	Zeineb Maghraoui	May 2023	African Championships	Tunis, Tunisia	
Total	179 kg	Zeineb Maghraoui	May 2023	African Championships	Tunis, Tunisia	
81 kg
Snatch	80 kg	Zeinab Maghraoui	14 July 2023	Arab Games	Bordj El Kiffan, Algeria	
Clean & Jerk	105 kg	Zeinab Maghraoui	14 July 2023	Arab Games	Bordj El Kiffan, Algeria	
Total	185 kg	Zeinab Maghraoui	14 July 2023	Arab Games	Bordj El Kiffan, Algeria	
87 kg
Snatch	86 kg	Ameni Ben Moussa	April 2019	African Championships	Cairo, Egypt	
Clean & Jerk	102 kg	Ameni Ben Moussa	29 May 2021	African Championships	Nairobi, Kenya	
Total	186 kg	Ameni Ben Moussa	April 2019	African Championships	Cairo, Egypt	
+87 kg
Snatch						
Clean & Jerk						
Total						

=== Men (1998–2018) ===
Event	Record	Athlete	Date	Meet	Place	Ref
-56 kg
Snatch	132 kg	Khalil El-Maaoui	29 July 2012	Olympic Games	(United Kingdom) London, Great Britain	
Clean & Jerk	146 kg	Khalil El-Maaoui	19 November 2009	World Championships	Goyang, South Korea	
Total	271 kg	Khalil El-Maaoui	19 November 2009	World Championships	Goyang, South Korea	
-62 kg
Snatch	137,5 kg	Atef Jarray	8 September 2001	Mediterranean Games	Rades, Tunisia	
Clean & Jerk	157,5 kg	Atef Jarray	8 September 2001	Mediterranean Games	Rades, Tunisia	
Total	295 kg	Atef Jarray	8 September 2001	Mediterranean Games	Rades, Tunisia	
-69 kg
Snatch	152,5 kg	Youssef Sbai	21 November 2002	World Championships	Warsaw, Poland	
Clean & Jerk	185 kg	Youssef Sbai	8 September 2001	Mediterranean Games	Rades, Tunisia	
Total	335 kg	Youssef Sbai	21 November 2002	World Championships	Warsaw, Poland	
-77 kg
Snatch	160 kg	Ramzi Bahloul	22 September 2010	World Championships	Antalya, Turkey	
Clean & Jerk	195 kg	Ramzi Bahloul	25 Juin 2013	Mediterranean Games	Mersin, Turkey	
Total	352 kg	Ramzi Bahloul	22 September 2010	World Championships	Antalya, Turkey	
-85 kg
Snatch	165 kg	Samir Ghachem	25 November 1999	World Championships	Athens, Greece	
Clean & Jerk	191 kg	Hamdi Doghmane	10 Juin 2007	Mediterranean Games	Mersin, Turkey	
Total	343 kg	Hamdi Doghmane	10 Juin 2007	Mediterranean Games	Mersin, Turkey	
-94 kg
Snatch	165 kg	Moez Hannachi	27 June 2005	Mediterranean Games	Almería, Spain	
Clean & Jerk	195 kg	Mohamed Amine Doghmane	27 June 2007	World Junior Championships	Prague, Czech Republic	
Total	355 kg	Mohamed Amine Doghmane	27 June 2007	World Junior Championships	Prague, Czech Republic	
-105 kg
Snatch	160 kg	Kamel Naoui	21 November 1999	World Championships	Athens, Greece	
Clean & Jerk	190 kg	Kamel Naoui	21 November 1999	World Championships	Athens, Greece	
Total	350 kg	Kamel Naoui	21 November 1999	World Championships	Athens, Greece	
+105 kg
Snatch	185 kg	Abdesattar Habbassi	14 November 2003	World Championships	Vancouver, Canada	
Clean & Jerk	210 kg	Abdesattar Habbassi	14 November 2003	World Championships	Vancouver, Canada	
Total	395 kg	Abdesattar Habbassi	14 November 2003	World Championships	Vancouver, Canada	

=== Women (1998–2018) ===
Event	Record	Athlete	Date	Meet	Place	Ref
48 kg
Snatch	68 kg	Nouha Landoulsi	7 April 2013	World Youth Championships	Tashkent, Uzbekistan	
Clean and jerk	88 kg	Nouha Landoulsi	7 April 2013	World Youth Championships	Tashkent, Uzbekistan	
Total	156 kg	Nouha Landoulsi	7 April 2013	World Youth Championships	Tashkent, Uzbekistan	
53 kg
Snatch	88 kg	Nouha Landoulsi	13 July 2017	African Championships	Vacoas, Mauritius	
Clean and jerk	106 kg	Nouha Landoulsi	13 July 2017	African Championships	Vacoas, Mauritius	
Total	194 kg	Nouha Landoulsi	13 July 2017	African Championships	Vacoas, Mauritius	
58 kg
Snatch	90 kg	Nouha Landoulsi	24 June 2018	Mediterranean Games	Tarragona, Spain	
Clean and jerk	115 kg	Nouha Landoulsi	23 March 2018	African Junior Championships	Cairo, Egypt	
Total	205 kg	Nouha Landoulsi	23 March 2018	African Junior Championships	Cairo, Egypt	
63 kg
Snatch	96 kg	Ghofrane Belkhir	25 June 2018	Mediterranean Games	Tarragona, Spain	
Clean and jerk	120 kg	Hayet Sassi	18 August 2004	Olympic Games	Athens, Greece	
Total	215 kg	Hayet Sassi	18 August 2004	Olympic Games	Athens, Greece	
69 kg
Snatch	105 kg	Ghada Hassine	25 June 2013	Mediterranean Games	Mersin, Turkey	
Clean and jerk	122 kg	Ghada Hassine	25 June 2013	Mediterranean Games	Mersin, Turkey	
Total	227 kg	Ghada Hassine	25 June 2013	Mediterranean Games	Mersin, Turkey	
75 kg
Snatch	100 kg	Ghada Hassine	6 September 2015	African Games	(Republic of the Congo) Brazzaville, Congo	
Clean and jerk	122 kg	Ghada Hassine	6 September 2015	African Games	(Republic of the Congo) Brazzaville, Congo	
Total	222 kg	Ghada Hassine	6 September 2015	African Games	(Republic of the Congo) Brazzaville, Congo	
+75 kg
Snatch	113 kg	Yosra Dhieb	27 November 2015	World Championships	Houston, United States	
Clean and jerk	140 kg	Yosra Dhieb	6 June 2015	World Junior Championships	Wrocław, Poland	
Total	251 kg	Yosra Dhieb	6 June 2015	World Junior Championships	Wrocław, Poland	
