= List of Cameroonian records in Olympic weightlifting =

The following are the national records in Olympic weightlifting in Cameroon. Records are maintained in each weight class for the snatch lift, clean and jerk lift, and the total for both lifts by the Fédération Camerounaise d'Haltérophilie et de Culturisme.

== Current records ==
=== Men ===
Event	Record	Athlete	Date	Meet	Place	Ref
60 kg
Snatch						
Clean & Jerk						
Total						
65 kg
Snatch						
Clean & Jerk						
Total						
71 kg
Snatch	115 kg	Gerard Thibauld Abeussa	9 November 2025	Islamic Solidarity Games	Riyadh, Saudi Arabia	
Clean & Jerk	155 kg	Gerard Thibauld Abeussa	9 November 2025	Islamic Solidarity Games	Riyadh, Saudi Arabia	
Total	275 kg	Gerard Thibauld Abeussa	9 November 2025	Islamic Solidarity Games	Riyadh, Saudi Arabia	
79 kg
Snatch	132 kg	Roger Brest Sinetang	10 November 2025	Islamic Solidarity Games	Riyadh, Saudi Arabia	
Clean & Jerk						
Total						
88 kg
Snatch	146 kg	Daniel Onana Tanga	10 November 2025	Islamic Solidarity Games	Riyadh, Saudi Arabia	
Clean & Jerk	183 kg	Daniel Onana Tanga	10 November 2025	Islamic Solidarity Games	Riyadh, Saudi Arabia	
Total	329 kg	Daniel Onana Tanga	10 November 2025	Islamic Solidarity Games	Riyadh, Saudi Arabia	
94 kg
Snatch	147 kg	Daniel Onana Tanga	29 July 2026	Commonwealth Games	Glasgow, United Kingdom	
Clean & Jerk	187 kg	Daniel Onana Tanga	29 July 2026	Commonwealth Games	Glasgow, United Kingdom	
Total	334 kg	Daniel Onana Tanga	29 July 2026	Commonwealth Games	Glasgow, United Kingdom	
110 kg
Snatch	156 kg	Junior Ngadja Nyabeyeu	12 November 2025	Islamic Solidarity Games	Riyadh, Saudi Arabia	
Clean & Jerk	202 kg	Junior Ngadja Nyabeyeu	12 November 2025	Islamic Solidarity Games	Riyadh, Saudi Arabia	
Total	358 kg	Junior Ngadja Nyabeyeu	12 November 2025	Islamic Solidarity Games	Riyadh, Saudi Arabia	
+110 kg
Snatch						
Clean & Jerk						
Total						

=== Women ===
Event	Record	Athlete	Date	Meet	Place	Ref
48 kg
Snatch						
Clean & Jerk						
Total						
53 kg
Snatch						
Clean & Jerk						
Total						
58 kg
Snatch						
Clean & Jerk						
Total						
63 kg
Snatch	71 kg	Madeleine Jacquette Ndolo Matam	10 November 2025	Islamic Solidarity Games	Riyadh, Saudi Arabia	
Clean & Jerk	85 kg	Madeleine Jacquette Ndolo Matam	10 November 2025	Islamic Solidarity Games	Riyadh, Saudi Arabia	
Total	156 kg	Madeleine Jacquette Ndolo Matam	10 November 2025	Islamic Solidarity Games	Riyadh, Saudi Arabia	
69 kg
Snatch						
Clean & Jerk						
Total						
77 kg
Snatch	75 kg	Madeleine Ornella Matam	11 November 2025	Islamic Solidarity Games	Riyadh, Saudi Arabia	
Clean & Jerk	95 kg	Madeleine Ornella Matam	11 November 2025	Islamic Solidarity Games	Riyadh, Saudi Arabia	
Total	170 kg	Madeleine Ornella Matam	11 November 2025	Islamic Solidarity Games	Riyadh, Saudi Arabia	
86 kg
Snatch	85 kg	Djifack Ma-atemkeng Zomgoua Raissa	11 November 2025	Islamic Solidarity Games	Riyadh, Saudi Arabia	
Clean & Jerk	112 kg	Djifack Ma-atemkeng Zomgoua Raissa	11 November 2025	Islamic Solidarity Games	Riyadh, Saudi Arabia	
Total	197 kg	Djifack Ma-atemkeng Zomgoua Raissa	11 November 2025	Islamic Solidarity Games	Riyadh, Saudi Arabia	
+86 kg
Snatch	80 kg	Estelle Adele Momeni	12 November 2025	Islamic Solidarity Games	Riyadh, Saudi Arabia	
Clean & Jerk	80 kg	Estelle Adele Momeni	12 November 2025	Islamic Solidarity Games	Riyadh, Saudi Arabia	
Total	160 kg	Estelle Adele Momeni	12 November 2025	Islamic Solidarity Games	Riyadh, Saudi Arabia	

== Historical records ==
=== Men (2018–2025) ===
Event	Record	Athlete	Date	Meet	Place	Ref
55 kg
Snatch						
Clean & Jerk						
Total						
61 kg
Snatch						
Clean & Jerk	125 kg	Alex Donfack Ngaban	1 May 2025	World Junior Championships	Lima, Peru	
Total						
67 kg
Snatch						
Clean & Jerk						
Total						
73 kg
Snatch	126 kg	Gerard Abeussa	May 2023	African Championships	Tunis, Tunisia	
Clean & Jerk	168 kg	Gerard Abeussa	May 2023	African Championships	Tunis, Tunisia	
Total	294 kg	Gerard Abeussa	May 2023	African Championships	Tunis, Tunisia	
81 kg
Snatch	139 kg	Michel Ngongang	1 August 2022	Commonwealth Games	Marston Green, Great Britain	
Clean & Jerk	167 kg	Michel Ngongang	13 August 2022	Islamic Solidarity Games	Konya, Turkey	
Total	302 kg	Jeremie Nzali	12 March 2024	African Games	Accra, Ghana	
89 kg
Snatch	140 kg	Cédric Feugno	14 August 2022	Islamic Solidarity Games	Konya, Turkey	
Clean and Jerk	180 kg	Daniel Onana	May 2023	African Championships	Tunis, Tunisia	
Total	320 kg	Daniel Onana	May 2023	African Championships	Tunis, Tunisia	
96 kg
Snatch	155 kg	Cyrille Tchatchet	31 July 2021	Olympic Games	Tokyo, Japan	
Clean and Jerk	195 kg	Cyrille Tchatchet	31 July 2021	Olympic Games	Tokyo, Japan	
Total	350 kg	Cyrille Tchatchet	31 July 2021	Olympic Games	Tokyo, Japan	
102 kg
Snatch	161 kg	Junior Ngadja Nyabeyeu	13 September 2023	World Championships	Riyadh, Saudi Arabia	
Clean and Jerk	202 kg	Junior Ngadja Nyabeyeu	13 September 2023	World Championships	Riyadh, Saudi Arabia	
Total	363 kg	Junior Ngadja Nyabeyeu	13 September 2023	World Championships	Riyadh, Saudi Arabia	
109 kg
Snatch	165 kg	Junior Ngadja Nyabeyeu	15 August 2022	Islamic Solidarity Games	Konya, Turkey	
Clean and Jerk	205 kg	Junior Ngadja Nyabeyeu	15 August 2022	Islamic Solidarity Games	Konya, Turkey	
Total	370 kg	Junior Ngadja Nyabeyeu	15 August 2022	Islamic Solidarity Games	Konya, Turkey	
+109 kg
Snatch						
Clean and Jerk						
Total						

=== Women (2018–2025) ===
Event	Record	Athlete	Date	Meet	Place	Ref
45 kg
Snatch						
Clean & Jerk						
Total						
49 kg
Snatch						
Clean & Jerk						
Total						
55 kg
Snatch						
Clean & Jerk						
Total						
59 kg
Snatch	55 kg	Ebongo Nelly Ebong	15 May 2023	African Championships	Tunis, Tunisia	
Clean & Jerk	71 kg	Ebongo Nelly Ebong	15 May 2023	African Championships	Tunis, Tunisia	
Total	126 kg	Ebongo Nelly Ebong	15 May 2023	African Championships	Tunis, Tunisia	
64 kg
Snatch						
Clean & Jerk						
Total						
71 kg
Snatch						
Clean & Jerk						
Total						
76 kg
Snatch	96 kg	Jeanne Eyenga	29 May 2021	African Championships	Nairobi, Kenya	
Clean & Jerk	124 kg	Jeanne Eyenga	14 August 2022	Islamic Solidarity Games	Konya, Turkey	
Total	214 kg	Jeanne Eyenga	14 August 2022	Islamic Solidarity Games	Konya, Turkey	
81 kg
Snatch	97 kg	Jeanne Eyenga	30 October 2022	African Championships	Cairo, Egypt	
Clean & Jerk	123 kg	Jeanne Eyenga	30 October 2022	African Championships	Cairo, Egypt	
Total	220 kg	Jeanne Eyenga	30 October 2022	African Championships	Cairo, Egypt	
87 kg
Snatch	101 kg	Clémentine Meukeugni	15 August 2022	Islamic Solidarity Games	Konya, Turkey	
Clean & Jerk	125 kg	Clémentine Meukeugni	2 August 2021	Olympic Games	Tokyo, Japan	
Total	224 kg	Clémentine Meukeugni	2 August 2021	Olympic Games	Tokyo, Japan	
+87 kg
Snatch	86 kg	Estelle Momeni	14 March 2024	African Games	Accra, Ghana	
Clean & Jerk	108 kg	Estelle Momeni	14 March 2024	African Games	Accra, Ghana	
Total	194 kg	Estelle Momeni	14 March 2024	African Games	Accra, Ghana	
