= List of Libyan records in Olympic weightlifting =

The following are the national records in Olympic weightlifting in Libya. Records are maintained in each weight class for the snatch lift, clean and jerk lift, and the total for both lifts by the Libyan Weightlifting Federation.

== Current records ==
=== Men ===
Event	Record	Athlete	Date	Meet	Place	Ref
60 kg
Snatch						
Clean & Jerk						
Total						
65 kg
Snatch						
Clean & Jerk						
Total						
71 kg
Snatch						
Clean & Jerk						
Total						
79 kg
Snatch	155 kg	Mohammed Al-Zintani	20 August 2025	African Junior Championships	Accra, Ghana	
Clean & Jerk	187 kg	Mohammed Al-Zintani	10 November 2025	Islamic Solidarity Games	Riyadh, Saudi Arabia	
Total	339 kg	Mohammed Al-Zintani	20 August 2025	African Junior Championships	Accra, Ghana	
88 kg
Snatch						
Clean & Jerk						
Total						
94 kg
Snatch	153 kg	Ahmed Abuzriba	11 November 2025	Islamic Solidarity Games	Riyadh, Saudi Arabia	
Clean & Jerk	195 kg	Ahmed Abuzriba	11 November 2025	Islamic Solidarity Games	Riyadh, Saudi Arabia	
Total	348 kg	Ahmed Abuzriba	11 November 2025	Islamic Solidarity Games	Riyadh, Saudi Arabia	
110 kg
Snatch						
Clean & Jerk						
Total						
+110 kg
Snatch						
Clean & Jerk						
Total						

=== Women ===
Event	Record	Athlete	Date	Meet	Place	Ref
48 kg
Snatch						
Clean & Jerk						
Total						
53 kg
Snatch						
Clean & Jerk						
Total						
58 kg
Snatch						
Clean & Jerk						
Total						
63 kg
Snatch						
Clean & Jerk						
Total						
69 kg
Snatch						
Clean & Jerk						
Total						
77 kg
Snatch						
Clean & Jerk						
Total						
86 kg
Snatch						
Clean & Jerk						
Total						
+86 kg
Snatch						
Clean & Jerk						
Total						

== Historical records ==
=== Men (2018–2025) ===
Event	Record	Athlete	Date	Meet	Place	Ref
55 kg
Snatch						
Clean & Jerk						
Total						
61 kg
Snatch	108 kg	Abdullah Khalleefah Bousheehah	April 2019	African Championships	Cairo, Egypt	
Clean & Jerk	136 kg	Abdullah Khalleefah Bousheehah	April 2019	African Championships	Cairo, Egypt	
Total	244 kg	Abdullah Khalleefah Bousheehah	April 2019	African Championships	Cairo, Egypt	
67 kg
Snatch	126 kg	Ahsaan Ali Alhadi Shabi	April 2019	African Championships	Cairo, Egypt	
Clean & Jerk	155 kg	Ahsaan Ali Alhadi Shabi	April 2019	African Championships	Cairo, Egypt	
Total	281 kg	Ahsaan Ali Alhadi Shabi	April 2019	African Championships	Cairo, Egypt	
73 kg
Snatch	146 kg	Mohammed Al-Zintani	22 September 2024	World Junior Championships	León, Spain	
Clean & Jerk	174 kg	Ahsaan Shabi	12 July 2023	Arab Games	Bordj El Kiffan, Algeria	
Total	317 kg	Mohammed Al-Zintani	22 September 2024	World Junior Championships	León, Spain	
81 kg
Snatch	141 kg	Mohammed Alzintani	12 March 2024	African Games	Accra, Ghana	
Clean and Jerk	174 kg	Mohammed Alzintani	12 March 2024	African Games	Accra, Ghana	
Total	315 kg	Mohammed Alzintani	12 March 2024	African Games	Accra, Ghana	
89 kg
Snatch	148 kg	Omar Al-Ajeemi	3 July 2022	Mediterranean Games	Oran, Algeria	
Clean and Jerk	185 kg	Omar Al-Ajeemi	3 July 2022	Mediterranean Games	Oran, Algeria	
Total	333 kg	Omar Al-Ajeemi	3 July 2022	Mediterranean Games	Oran, Algeria	
96 kg
Snatch	150 kg	Ahmed Abuzriba	29 May 2021	African Championships	Nairobi, Kenya	
Clean and Jerk	186 kg	Ahmed Abuzriba	29 May 2021	African Championships	Nairobi, Kenya	
Total	336 kg	Ahmed Abuzriba	29 May 2021	African Championships	Nairobi, Kenya	
102 kg
Snatch	164 kg	Ahmed Abuzriba	31 October 2022	African Championships	Cairo, Egypt	
Clean and Jerk	205 kg	Ahmed Abuzriba	31 October 2022	African Championships	Cairo, Egypt	
Total	369 kg	Ahmed Abuzriba	31 October 2022	African Championships	Cairo, Egypt	
109 kg
Snatch						
Clean and Jerk						
Total						
+109 kg
Snatch						
Clean and Jerk						
Total						

=== Women (2018–2025) ===
Event	Record	Athlete	Date	Meet	Place	Ref
45 kg
Snatch						
Clean and Jerk						
Total						
49 kg
Snatch						
Clean and Jerk						
Total						
55 kg
Snatch						
Clean and Jerk						
Total						
59 kg
Snatch						
Clean & Jerk						
Total						
64 kg
Snatch						
Clean and Jerk						
Total						
71 kg
Snatch						
Clean and Jerk						
Total						
76 kg
Snatch						
Clean and Jerk						
Total						
81 kg
Snatch						
Clean and Jerk						
Total						
87 kg
Snatch						
Clean and Jerk						
Total						
+87 kg
Snatch						
Clean and Jerk						
Total						
