= List of Bahraini records in Olympic weightlifting =

The following are the national records in Olympic weightlifting in Bahrain. Records are maintained in each weight class for the snatch lift, clean and jerk lift, and the total for both lifts by the Bahrain Weightlifting Federation.

== Current records ==
=== Men ===
Event	Record	Athlete	Date	Meet	Place	Ref
60 kg
Snatch						
Clean & Jerk						
Total						
65 kg
Snatch						
Clean & Jerk						
Total						
71 kg
Snatch						
Clean & Jerk						
Total						
79 kg
Snatch						
Clean & Jerk						
Total						
88 kg
Snatch						
Clean & Jerk						
Total						
94 kg
Snatch						
Clean & Jerk						
Total						
110 kg
Snatch						
Clean & Jerk						
Total						
+110 kg
Snatch	213 kg	Gor Minasyan	12 November 2025	Islamic Solidarity Games	Riyadh, Saudi Arabia	
Clean & Jerk	247 kg	Gor Minasyan	12 November 2025	Islamic Solidarity Games	Riyadh, Saudi Arabia	
Total	460 kg	Gor Minasyan	12 November 2025	Islamic Solidarity Games	Riyadh, Saudi Arabia	

=== Women ===
Event	Record	Athlete	Date	Meet	Place	Ref
48 kg
Snatch						
Clean & Jerk						
Total						
53 kg
Snatch						
Clean & Jerk						
Total						
58 kg
Snatch						
Clean & Jerk						
Total						
63 kg
Snatch						
Clean & Jerk						
Total						
69 kg
Snatch	107 kg	Ingrid Segura	7 October 2025	World Championships	Førde, Norway	
Clean & Jerk	134 kg	Ingrid Segura	7 October 2025	World Championships	Førde, Norway	
Total	241 kg	Ingrid Segura	7 October 2025	World Championships	Førde, Norway	
77 kg
Snatch						
Clean & Jerk						
Total						
86 kg
Snatch						
Clean & Jerk						
Total						
+86 kg
Snatch						
Clean & Jerk						
Total						

== Historical records ==
=== Men (2018–2025) ===
Event	Record	Athlete	Date	Meet	Place	Ref
55 kg
Snatch						
Clean & Jerk						
Total						
61 kg
Snatch						
Clean & Jerk						
Total						
67 kg
Snatch						
Clean & Jerk						
Total						
73 kg
Snatch						
Clean & Jerk						
Total						
81 kg
Snatch						
Clean & Jerk						
Total						
89 kg
Snatch	127 kg	Husain Ali Saif	13 July 2023	Arab Games	Bordj El Kiffan, Algeria	
Clean & Jerk	165 kg	Husain Ali Saif	13 July 2023	Arab Games	Bordj El Kiffan, Algeria	
Total	292 kg	Husain Ali Saif	13 July 2023	Arab Games	Bordj El Kiffan, Algeria	
96 kg
Snatch	182 kg	Lesman Paredes	15 October 2022	Asian Championships	Manama, Bahrain	
Clean & Jerk	215 kg	Lesman Paredes	15 October 2022	Asian Championships	Manama, Bahrain	
Total	397 kg	Lesman Paredes	15 October 2022	Asian Championships	Manama, Bahrain	
102 kg
Snatch	186 kg	Lesman Paredes	8 April 2024	World Cup	Phuket, Thailand	
Clean & Jerk	212 kg	Lesman Paredes	8 April 2024	World Cup	Phuket, Thailand	
Total	398 kg	Lesman Paredes	8 April 2024	World Cup	Phuket, Thailand	
109 kg
Snatch						
Clean & Jerk						
Total						
+109 kg
Snatch	217 kg	Gor Minasyan	13 May 2023	Asian Championships	Jinju, South Korea	
Clean & Jerk	250 kg	Gor Minasyan	16 December 2022	World Championships	Bogotá, Colombia	
Total	464 kg	Gor Minasyan	13 May 2023	Asian Championships	Jinju, South Korea	

=== Women (2018–2025) ===
Event	Record	Athlete	Date	Meet	Place	Ref
45 kg
Snatch						
Clean & Jerk						
Total						
49 kg
Snatch						
Clean & Jerk						
Total						
55 kg
Snatch	56 kg	Eman Abdulnabi Shakeeb	9 October 2022	Asian Championships	Manama, Bahrain	
Clean & Jerk	73 kg	Eman Abdulnabi Shakeeb	9 October 2022	Asian Championships	Manama, Bahrain	
Total	129 kg	Eman Abdulnabi Shakeeb	9 October 2022	Asian Championships	Manama, Bahrain	
59 kg
Snatch						
Clean & Jerk						
Total						
64 kg
Snatch	72 kg	Zainab Yahya	13 August 2022	Islamic Solidarity Games	Konya, Turkey	
Clean & Jerk						
Total						
71 kg
Snatch	76 kg	Zainab Ali Abdulla Yahya	12 October 2022	Asian Championships	Manama, Bahrain	
Clean & Jerk	91 kg	Zainab Ali Abdulla Yahya	12 October 2022	Asian Championships	Manama, Bahrain	
Total	167 kg	Zainab Ali Abdulla Yahya	12 October 2022	Asian Championships	Manama, Bahrain	
76 kg
Snatch	81 kg	Ali Yusuf Yahya Zainab	14 September 2023	World Championships	Riyadh, Saudi Arabia	
Clean & Jerk	107 kg	Ali Yusuf Yahya Zainab	14 September 2023	World Championships	Riyadh, Saudi Arabia	
Total	188 kg	Ali Yusuf Yahya Zainab	14 September 2023	World Championships	Riyadh, Saudi Arabia	
81 kg
Snatch	83 kg	Zainab Yahya	14 July 2023	Arab Games	Bordj El Kiffan, Algeria	
Clean & Jerk	106 kg	Zainab Yahya	14 July 2023	Arab Games	Bordj El Kiffan, Algeria	
Total	189 kg	Zainab Yahya	14 July 2023	Arab Games	Bordj El Kiffan, Algeria	
87 kg
Snatch						
Clean & Jerk						
Total						
+87 kg
Snatch						
Clean & Jerk						
Total						
