= List of Jordanian records in Olympic weightlifting =

The following are the records of Jordan in Olympic weightlifting. Records are maintained in each weight class for the snatch lift, clean and jerk lift, and the total for both lifts by the Jordanian Weightlifting Federation.

== Current records ==
=== Men ===
Event	Record	Athlete	Date	Meet	Place	Ref
60 kg
Snatch						
Clean & Jerk						
Total						
65 kg
Snatch						
Clean & Jerk						
Total						
71 kg
Snatch						
Clean & Jerk						
Total						
79 kg
Snatch						
Clean & Jerk						
Total						
88 kg
Snatch						
Clean & Jerk						
Total						
94 kg
Snatch						
Clean & Jerk						
Total						
110 kg
Snatch	161 kg	Asem Al-Sallaj	12 November 2025	Islamic Solidarity Games	Riyadh, Saudi Arabia	
Clean & Jerk	205 kg	Asem Al-Sallaj	12 November 2025	Islamic Solidarity Games	Riyadh, Saudi Arabia	
Total	366 kg	Asem Al-Sallaj	12 November 2025	Islamic Solidarity Games	Riyadh, Saudi Arabia	
+110 kg
Snatch						
Clean & Jerk						
Total						

== Historical records ==
=== Men (2018–2025) ===
Event	Record	Athlete	Date	Meet	Place	Ref
55 kg
Snatch						
Clean & Jerk						
Total						
61 kg
Snatch						
Clean & Jerk						
Total						
67 kg
Snatch	102 kg	Ibrahim Al-Fararjeh	12 August 2022	Islamic Solidarity Games	Konya, Turkey	
Clean & Jerk	120 kg	Ibrahim Al-Fararjeh	12 August 2022	Islamic Solidarity Games	Konya, Turkey	
Total	222 kg	Ibrahim Al-Fararjeh	12 August 2022	Islamic Solidarity Games	Konya, Turkey	
73 kg
Snatch	120 kg	Ahmad Khawaldeh	12 July 2023	Arab Games	Bordj El Kiffan, Algeria	
Clean & Jerk	140 kg	Ahmad Khawaldeh	12 July 2023	Arab Games	Bordj El Kiffan, Algeria	
Total	260 kg	Ahmad Khawaldeh	12 July 2023	Arab Games	Bordj El Kiffan, Algeria	
81 kg
Snatch						
Clean & Jerk						
Total						
89 kg
Snatch	140 kg	Malek Mousa	April 2019	Asian Championships	Ningbo, China	
Clean & Jerk	170 kg	Malek Mousa	April 2019	Asian Championships	Ningbo, China	
Total	310 kg	Malek Mousa	April 2019	Asian Championships	Ningbo, China	
96 kg
Snatch	140 kg	Asem Al-Sallaj	11 May 2023	Asian Championships	Jinju, South Korea	
Clean & Jerk	180 kg	Asem Al-Sallaj	11 May 2023	Asian Championships	Jinju, South Korea	
Total	320 kg	Asem Al-Sallaj	11 May 2023	Asian Championships	Jinju, South Korea	
102 kg
Snatch	146 kg	Asem Al-Sallaj	8 April 2024	World Cup	Phuket, Thailand	
Clean & Jerk	191 kg	Asem Al-Sallaj	8 April 2024	World Cup	Phuket, Thailand	
Total	337 kg	Asem Al-Sallaj	8 April 2024	World Cup	Phuket, Thailand	
109 kg
Snatch	140 kg	Asem Al-Sallaj	5 October 2023	Asian Games	Hangzhou, China	
Clean & Jerk	188 kg	Asem Al-Sallaj	5 October 2023	Asian Games	Hangzhou, China	
Total	328 kg	Asem Al-Sallaj	5 October 2023	Asian Games	Hangzhou, China	
+109 kg
Snatch						
Clean & Jerk						
Total						

=== Women (2018–2025) ===
Event	Record	Athlete	Date	Meet	Place	Ref
45 kg
Snatch						
Clean & Jerk						
Total						
49 kg
Snatch						
Clean & Jerk						
Total						
55 kg
Snatch						
Clean & Jerk						
Total						
59 kg
Snatch						
Clean & Jerk						
Total						
64 kg
Snatch	75 kg	Sarah Abu Shawish	11 October 2022	Asian Championships	Manama, Bahrain	
Clean & Jerk	95 kg	Sarah Abu Shawish	11 October 2022	Asian Championships	Manama, Bahrain	
Total	170 kg	Sarah Abu Shawish	11 October 2022	Asian Championships	Manama, Bahrain	
71 kg
Snatch						
Clean & Jerk						
Total						
76 kg
Snatch	80 kg	Dema Zebdieh	13 October 2022	Asian Championships	Manama, Bahrain	
Clean & Jerk	95 kg	Dema Zebdieh	13 October 2022	Asian Championships	Manama, Bahrain	
Total	175 kg	Dema Zebdieh	13 October 2022	Asian Championships	Manama, Bahrain	
81 kg
Snatch						
Clean & Jerk						
Total						
87 kg
Snatch						
Clean & Jerk						
Total						
+87 kg
Snatch						
Clean & Jerk						
Total						
