= List of Iraqi records in Olympic weightlifting =

The following are the records of Iraq in Olympic weightlifting. Records are maintained in each weight class for the snatch lift, clean and jerk lift, and the total for both lifts by the Iraq Weightlifting Federation.

== Current records ==
=== Men ===
Event	Record	Athlete	Date	Meet	Place	Ref
60 kg
Snatch						
Clean & Jerk						
Total						
65 kg
Snatch						
Clean & Jerk						
Total						
71 kg
Snatch						
Clean & Jerk						
Total						
79 kg
Snatch						
Clean & Jerk						
Total						
88 kg
Snatch						
Clean & Jerk						
Total						
94 kg
Snatch	163 kg	Layth Al-Chlaihawi	11 November 2025	Islamic Solidarity Games	Riyadh, Saudi Arabia	
Clean & Jerk						
Total						
110 kg
Snatch	173 kg	Salwan Al-Aifuri	12 November 2025	Islamic Solidarity Games	Riyadh, Saudi Arabia	
Clean & Jerk	215 kg	Salwan Al-Aifuri	12 November 2025	Islamic Solidarity Games	Riyadh, Saudi Arabia	
Total	388 kg	Salwan Al-Aifuri	12 November 2025	Islamic Solidarity Games	Riyadh, Saudi Arabia	
+110 kg
Snatch	212 kg	Ali Rubaiawi	12 November 2025	Islamic Solidarity Games	Riyadh, Saudi Arabia	
Clean & Jerk	246 kg	Ali Rubaiawi	12 November 2025	Islamic Solidarity Games	Riyadh, Saudi Arabia	
Total	458 kg	Ali Rubaiawi	12 November 2025	Islamic Solidarity Games	Riyadh, Saudi Arabia	

=== Women ===
Event	Record	Athlete	Date	Meet	Place	Ref
48 kg
Snatch						
Clean & Jerk						
Total						
53 kg
Snatch						
Clean & Jerk						
Total						
58 kg
Snatch	83 kg	Noura Essam Helmi Abdelbari Mohamed	9 November 2025	Islamic Solidarity Games	Riyadh, Saudi Arabia	
Clean & Jerk	106 kg	Noura Essam Helmi Abdelbari Mohamed	9 November 2025	Islamic Solidarity Games	Riyadh, Saudi Arabia	
Total	189 kg	Noura Essam Helmi Abdelbari Mohamed	9 November 2025	Islamic Solidarity Games	Riyadh, Saudi Arabia	
63 kg
Snatch	80 kg	Yasmine Mohamed Abdalla Mohamed Metawea	10 November 2025	Islamic Solidarity Games	Riyadh, Saudi Arabia	
Clean & Jerk	100 kg	Yasmine Mohamed Abdalla Mohamed Metawea	10 November 2025	Islamic Solidarity Games	Riyadh, Saudi Arabia	
Total	180 kg	Yasmine Mohamed Abdalla Mohamed Metawea	10 November 2025	Islamic Solidarity Games	Riyadh, Saudi Arabia	
69 kg
Snatch						
Clean & Jerk						
Total						
77 kg
Snatch						
Clean & Jerk						
Total						
86 kg
Snatch	116 kg	Rahma Ahmed Abdelrazek Hassan Elsayed	11 November 2025	Islamic Solidarity Games	Riyadh, Saudi Arabia	
Clean & Jerk	127 kg	Rahma Ahmed Abdelrazek Hassan Elsayed	11 November 2025	Islamic Solidarity Games	Riyadh, Saudi Arabia	
Total	243 kg	Rahma Ahmed Abdelrazek Hassan Elsayed	11 November 2025	Islamic Solidarity Games	Riyadh, Saudi Arabia	
+86 kg
Snatch						
Clean & Jerk						
Total						

== Historical records ==
=== Men (2018–2025) ===
Event	Record	Athlete	Date	Meet	Place	Ref
55 kg
Snatch	107 kg	Ali Ahmed Abd Ali Albacha Chee	5 September 2023	World Championships	Riyadh, Saudi Arabia	
Clean & Jerk	130 kg	Ali Ahmed Abd Ali Albacha Chee	5 September 2023	World Championships	Riyadh, Saudi Arabia	
Total	237 kg	Ali Ahmed Abd Ali Albacha Chee	5 September 2023	World Championships	Riyadh, Saudi Arabia	
61 kg
Snatch	111 kg	Mohammed Ahmed Albachachee	11 July 2023	Arab Games	Bordj El Kiffan, Algeria	
Clean & Jerk	148 kg	Mohammed Ahmed Albachachee	11 July 2023	Arab Games	Bordj El Kiffan, Algeria	
Total	259 kg	Mohammed Ahmed Albachachee	11 July 2023	Arab Games	Bordj El Kiffan, Algeria	
67 kg
Snatch						
Clean & Jerk						
Total						
73 kg
Snatch						
Clean & Jerk	151 kg	Mustafa Jawad	12 July 2023	Arab Games	Bordj El Kiffan, Algeria	
Total						
81 kg
Snatch	135 kg	Ahmed Al-Hussein	9 December 2023	IWF Grand Prix II	Doha, Qatar	
Clean & Jerk	170 kg	Ahmed Al-Hussein	9 December 2023	IWF Grand Prix II	Doha, Qatar	
Total	305 kg	Ahmed Al-Hussein	9 December 2023	IWF Grand Prix II	Doha, Qatar	
89 kg
Snatch	162 kg	Rashid Al-Jumaili	13 July 2023	Arab Games	Bordj El Kiffan, Algeria	
Clean & Jerk	202 kg	Rashid Al-Jumaili	13 July 2023	Arab Games	Bordj El Kiffan, Algeria	
Total	364 kg	Rashid Al-Jumaili	13 July 2023	Arab Games	Bordj El Kiffan, Algeria	
96 kg
Snatch	177 kg	Qasim Al-Lami	5 October 2023	Asian Games	Hangzhou, China	
Clean & Jerk	204 kg	Qasim Al-Lami	13 September 2023	World Championships	Riyadh, Saudi Arabia	
Total	380 kg	Qasim Al-Lami	5 October 2023	Asian Games	Hangzhou, China	
102 kg
Snatch	172 kg	Qasim Al-Lami	14 July 2023	Arab Games	Bordj El Kiffan, Algeria	
Clean & Jerk	192 kg	Qasim Al-Lami	14 July 2023	Arab Games	Bordj El Kiffan, Algeria	
Total	364 kg	Qasim Al-Lami	14 July 2023	Arab Games	Bordj El Kiffan, Algeria	
109 kg
Snatch	178 kg	Ali Rubaiawi	13 May 2023	Asian Championships	Jinju, South Korea	
Clean & Jerk	211 kg	Ali Rubaiawi	13 May 2023	Asian Championships	Jinju, South Korea	
Total	389 kg	Ali Rubaiawi	13 May 2023	Asian Championships	Jinju, South Korea	
+109 kg
Snatch	204 kg	Ali Rubaiawi	15 December 2024	World Championships	Manama, Bahrain	
Clean & Jerk	247 kg	Ali Rubaiawi	15 December 2024	World Championships	Manama, Bahrain	
Total	451 kg	Ali Rubaiawi	15 December 2024	World Championships	Manama, Bahrain	

=== Women (2018–2025) ===
Event	Record	Athlete	Date	Meet	Place	Ref
45 kg
Snatch						
Clean & Jerk						
Total						
49 kg
Snatch						
Clean & Jerk						
Total						
55 kg
Snatch						
Clean & Jerk						
Total						
59 kg
Snatch	62 kg	Manasik Al-Malahma	12 July 2023	Arab Games	Bordj El Kiffan, Algeria	
Clean & Jerk	82 kg	Manasik Al-Malahma	12 July 2023	Arab Games	Bordj El Kiffan, Algeria	
Total	144 kg	Manasik Al-Malahma	12 July 2023	Arab Games	Bordj El Kiffan, Algeria	
64 kg
Snatch						
Clean & Jerk						
Total						
71 kg
Snatch						
Clean & Jerk						
Total						
76 kg
Snatch						
Clean & Jerk						
Total						
81 kg
Snatch	85 kg	Hadeel Al-Saedi	14 July 2023	Arab Games	Bordj El Kiffan, Algeria	
Clean & Jerk	108 kg	Hadeel Al-Saedi	14 July 2023	Arab Games	Bordj El Kiffan, Algeria	
Total	193 kg	Hadeel Al-Saedi	14 July 2023	Arab Games	Bordj El Kiffan, Algeria	
87 kg
Snatch						
Clean & Jerk						
Total						
+87 kg
Snatch	58 kg	Rayan Abdulqader	14 July 2023	Arab Games	Bordj El Kiffan, Algeria	
Clean & Jerk	85 kg	Rayan Abdulqader	14 July 2023	Arab Games	Bordj El Kiffan, Algeria	
Total	143 kg	Rayan Abdulqader	14 July 2023	Arab Games	Bordj El Kiffan, Algeria	

=== Men (1998–2018) ===
Event	Record	Athlete	Date	Meet	Place	Ref
56 kg
Snatch	111 kg	Ali Ahmed Abdullah Albachachi	13 May 2017	Islamic Solidarity Games	Baku, Azerbaijan	
Clean and jerk						
Total						
62 kg
Snatch						
Clean and jerk						
Total						
69 kg
Snatch						
Clean and jerk						
Total						
77 kg
Snatch	146 kg	Ahmed Al-Hussein	21 September 2017	Asian Indoor and Martial Arts Games	Ashgabat, Turkmenistan	
Clean and jerk	177 kg	Ahmed Al-Hussein	21 September 2017	Asian Indoor and Martial Arts Games	Ashgabat, Turkmenistan	
Total	323 kg	Ahmed Al-Hussein	21 September 2017	Asian Indoor and Martial Arts Games	Ashgabat, Turkmenistan	
85 kg
Snatch	161 kg	Safaa Al-Jumaili	22 September 2017	Asian Indoor and Martial Arts Games	Ashgabat, Turkmenistan	
Clean and jerk	204 kg	Safaa Al-Jumaili	22 September 2017	Asian Indoor and Martial Arts Games	Ashgabat, Turkmenistan	
Total	365 kg	Safaa Al-Jumaili	22 September 2017	Asian Indoor and Martial Arts Games	Ashgabat, Turkmenistan	
94 kg
Snatch						
Clean and jerk						
Total						
105 kg
Snatch	180 kg	Salwan Jasim Abbood	15 August 2016	Olympic Games	Rio de Janeiro, Brazil	
Clean and jerk	219 kg	Salwan Al-Aifuri	24 September 2017	Asian Indoor and Martial Arts Games	Ashgabat, Turkmenistan	
Total	395 kg	Salwan Al-Aifuri	24 September 2017	Asian Indoor and Martial Arts Games	Ashgabat, Turkmenistan	
+105 kg
Snatch						
Clean and jerk						
Total						

=== Women (1998–2018) ===
Event	Record	Athlete	Date	Meet	Place	Ref
48 kg
Snatch						
Clean and jerk						
Total						
53 kg
Snatch	69 kg	Hadeel Al-Saedi	13 May 2017	Islamic Solidarity Games	Baku, Azerbaijan	
Clean and jerk	84 kg	Hadeel Al-Saedi	13 May 2017	Islamic Solidarity Games	Baku, Azerbaijan	
Total	153 kg	Hadeel Al-Saedi	13 May 2017	Islamic Solidarity Games	Baku, Azerbaijan	
58 kg
Snatch						
Clean and jerk						
Total						
63 kg
Snatch						
Clean and jerk						
Total						
69 kg
Snatch						
Clean and jerk						
Total						
75 kg
Snatch						
Clean and jerk						
Total						
90 kg
Snatch	94 kg	Huda Salim Al-Saedi	24 September 2017	Asian Indoor and Martial Arts Games	Ashgabat, Turkmenistan	
Clean & Jerk	115 kg	Huda Salim Al-Saedi	24 September 2017	Asian Indoor and Martial Arts Games	Ashgabat, Turkmenistan	
Total	209 kg	Huda Salim Al-Saedi	24 September 2017	Asian Indoor and Martial Arts Games	Ashgabat, Turkmenistan	
+90 kg
Snatch						
Clean and jerk						
Total						
