= List of Palestinian records in Olympic weightlifting =

The following are the records of Palestine in Olympic weightlifting. Records are maintained in each weight class for the snatch lift, clean and jerk lift, and the total for both lifts by the Palestinian Weightlifting Federation (PWF).

== Current records ==
=== Men ===
Event	Record	Athlete	Date	Meet	Place	Ref
60 kg
Snatch						
Clean & Jerk						
Total						
65 kg
Snatch						
Clean & Jerk						
Total						
71 kg
Snatch						
Clean & Jerk						
Total						
79 kg
Snatch						
Clean & Jerk						
Total						
88 kg
Snatch						
Clean & Jerk						
Total						
94 kg
Snatch						
Clean & Jerk						
Total						
110 kg
Snatch	158 kg	Mohammed Hamada	12 November 2025	Islamic Solidarity Games	Riyadh, Saudi Arabia	
Clean & Jerk	182 kg	Mohammed Hamada	12 November 2025	Islamic Solidarity Games	Riyadh, Saudi Arabia	
Total	340 kg	Mohammed Hamada	12 November 2025	Islamic Solidarity Games	Riyadh, Saudi Arabia	
+110 kg
Snatch						
Clean & Jerk						
Total						

=== Women ===
Event	Record	Athlete	Date	Meet	Place	Ref
48 kg
Snatch						
Clean & Jerk						
Total						
53 kg
Snatch						
Clean & Jerk						
Total						
58 kg
Snatch						
Clean & Jerk						
Total						
63 kg
Snatch						
Clean & Jerk						
Total						
69 kg
Snatch						
Clean & Jerk						
Total						
77 kg
Snatch						
Clean & Jerk						
Total						
86 kg
Snatch						
Clean & Jerk						
Total						
+86 kg
Snatch						
Clean & Jerk						
Total						

== Historical records ==
=== Men (2018–2025) ===
Event	Record	Athlete	Date	Meet	Place	Ref
55 kg
Snatch						
Clean & Jerk						
Total						
61 kg
Snatch						
Clean & Jerk						
Total						
67 kg
Snatch						
Clean & Jerk						
Total						
73 kg
Snatch						
Clean & Jerk						
Total						
81 kg
Snatch						
Clean & Jerk						
Total						
89 kg
Snatch						
Clean & Jerk						
Total						
96 kg
Snatch	137 kg	Mohammed Hamada	31 July 2021	Olympic Games	Tokyo, Japan	
Clean & Jerk	173 kg	Mohammed Hamada	31 July 2021	Olympic Games	Tokyo, Japan	
Total	310 kg	Mohammed Hamada	31 July 2021	Olympic Games	Tokyo, Japan	
102 kg
Snatch	168 kg	Mohammed Hamada	8 May 2022	Junior World Championships	Heraklion, Greece	
Clean & Jerk	193 kg	Mohammed Hamada	8 May 2022	Junior World Championships	Heraklion, Greece	
Total	361 kg	Mohammed Hamada	8 May 2022	Junior World Championships	Heraklion, Greece	
109 kg
Snatch						
Clean & Jerk						
Total						
+109 kg
Snatch						
Clean & Jerk						
Total						

=== Women (2018–2025) ===
Event	Record	Athlete	Date	Meet	Place	Ref
45 kg
Snatch						
Clean & Jerk						
Total						
49 kg
Snatch						
Clean & Jerk						
Total						
55 kg
Snatch	59 kg	Subreen Dari	30 September 2023	Asian Games	Hangzhou, China	
Clean & Jerk	74 kg	Subreen Dari	30 September 2023	Asian Games	Hangzhou, China	
Total	133 kg	Subreen Dari	30 September 2023	Asian Games	Hangzhou, China	
59 kg
Snatch	63 kg	Subreen Dari	12 July 2023	Arab Games	Bordj El Kiffan, Algeria	
Clean & Jerk	81 kg	Subreen Dari	12 July 2023	Arab Games	Bordj El Kiffan, Algeria	
Total	144 kg	Subreen Dari	12 July 2023	Arab Games	Bordj El Kiffan, Algeria	
64 kg
Snatch						
Clean & Jerk						
Total						
71 kg
Snatch						
Clean & Jerk						
Total						
76 kg
Snatch						
Clean & Jerk						
Total						
81 kg
Snatch						
Clean & Jerk						
Total						
87 kg
Snatch						
Clean & Jerk						
Total						
+87 kg
Snatch						
Clean & Jerk						
Total						
