= List of Emirati records in Olympic weightlifting =

The following are the national records in Olympic weightlifting in the United Arab Emirates. Records are maintained in each weight class for the snatch lift, clean and jerk lift, and the total for both lifts by the Emirates Weightlifting Federation.

== Current records ==
=== Men ===
Event	Record	Athlete	Date	Meet	Place	Ref
60 kg
Snatch						
Clean & Jerk						
Total						
65 kg
Snatch						
Clean & Jerk						
Total						
71 kg
Snatch						
Clean & Jerk						
Total						
79 kg
Snatch	130 kg	Issa Al-Blooshi	10 November 2025	Islamic Solidarity Games	Riyadh, Saudi Arabia	
Clean & Jerk	156 kg	Issa Al-Blooshi	10 November 2025	Islamic Solidarity Games	Riyadh, Saudi Arabia	
Total	286 kg	Issa Al-Blooshi	10 November 2025	Islamic Solidarity Games	Riyadh, Saudi Arabia	
88 kg
Snatch						
Clean & Jerk						
Total						
94 kg
Snatch						
Clean & Jerk						
Total						
110 kg
Snatch	167 kg	Ezzeddin Al-Ghafeer	12 November 2025	Islamic Solidarity Games	Riyadh, Saudi Arabia	
Clean & Jerk	200 kg	Ezzeddin Al-Ghafeer	12 November 2025	Islamic Solidarity Games	Riyadh, Saudi Arabia	
Total	367 kg	Ezzeddin Al-Ghafeer	12 November 2025	Islamic Solidarity Games	Riyadh, Saudi Arabia	
+110 kg
Snatch						
Clean & Jerk						
Total						

=== Women ===
Event	Record	Athlete	Date	Meet	Place	Ref
48 kg
Snatch						
Clean & Jerk						
Total						
53 kg
Snatch						
Clean & Jerk						
Total						
58 kg
Snatch						
Clean & Jerk						
Total						
63 kg
Snatch	78 kg	Mai Almadani	10 November 2025	Islamic Solidarity Games	Riyadh, Saudi Arabia	
Clean & Jerk	92 kg	Mai Almadani	10 November 2025	Islamic Solidarity Games	Riyadh, Saudi Arabia	
Total	170 kg	Mai Almadani	10 November 2025	Islamic Solidarity Games	Riyadh, Saudi Arabia	
69 kg
Snatch						
Clean & Jerk						
Total						
77 kg
Snatch						
Clean & Jerk						
Total						
86 kg
Snatch						
Clean & Jerk						
Total						
+86 kg
Snatch						
Clean & Jerk						
Total						

== Historical records ==
=== Men (2018–2025) ===
Event	Record	Athlete	Date	Meet	Place	Ref
55 kg
Snatch						
Clean & Jerk						
Total						
61 kg
Snatch						
Clean & Jerk						
Total						
67 kg
Snatch	95 kg	Khaled Al-Qasimi	12 August 2022	Islamic Solidarity Games	Konya, Turkey	
Clean & Jerk	120 kg	Khaled Al-Qasimi	12 August 2022	Islamic Solidarity Games	Konya, Turkey	
Total	215 kg	Khaled Al-Qasimi	12 August 2022	Islamic Solidarity Games	Konya, Turkey	
73 kg
Snatch	96 kg	Issa Al-Balushi	22 April 2019	Asian Championships	Ningbo, China	
Clean & Jerk	118 kg	Issa Al-Balushi	22 April 2019	Asian Championships	Ningbo, China	
Total	214 kg	Issa Al-Balushi	22 April 2019	Asian Championships	Ningbo, China	
81 kg
Snatch	100 kg	Ahmad Mohammed Mustafa	13 August 2022	Islamic Solidarity Games	Konya, Turkey	
Clean & Jerk	125 kg	Ahmad Mohammed Mustafa	13 August 2022	Islamic Solidarity Games	Konya, Turkey	
Total	225 kg	Ahmad Mohammed Mustafa	13 August 2022	Islamic Solidarity Games	Konya, Turkey	
89 kg
Snatch	132 kg	Issa Al-Balushi	5 April 2024,	World Cup	Phuket, Thailand	
Clean & Jerk	160 kg	Issa Al-Balushi	9 December 2023	IWF Grand Prix II	Doha, Qatar	
Total	290 kg	Issa Al-Balushi	9 December 2023	IWF Grand Prix II	Doha, Qatar	
96 kg
Snatch						
Clean & Jerk						
Total						
102 kg
Snatch	164 kg	Alghafeer Ezzeddin	8 April 2024	World Cup	Phuket, Thailand	
Clean & Jerk						
Total						
109 kg
Snatch						
Clean & Jerk						
Total						
+109 kg
Snatch						
Clean & Jerk						
Total						

=== Women (2018–2025) ===
Event	Record	Athlete	Date	Meet	Place	Ref
45 kg
Snatch						
Clean & Jerk						
Total						
49 kg
Snatch						
Clean & Jerk						
Total						
55 kg
Snatch	47 kg	Zahra Al-Hashmi	10 May 2025	Asian Championships	Jiangshan, China	
Clean & Jerk	62 kg	Zahra Al-Hashmi	10 May 2025	Asian Championships	Jiangshan, China	
Total	109 kg	Zahra Al-Hashmi	10 May 2025	Asian Championships	Jiangshan, China	
59 kg
Snatch						
Clean & Jerk						
Total						
64 kg
Snatch	53 kg	Alia Al-Bastaki	13 August 2022	Islamic Solidarity Games	Konya, Turkey	
Clean & Jerk	58 kg	Alia Al-Bastaki	13 August 2022	Islamic Solidarity Games	Konya, Turkey	
Total	111 kg	Alia Al-Bastaki	13 August 2022	Islamic Solidarity Games	Konya, Turkey	
71 kg
Snatch	73 kg	Mai Al-Madani	11 September 2023	World Championships	Riyadh, Saudi Arabia	
Clean & Jerk	86 kg	Mai Al-Madani	7 February 2024	Asian Championships	Tashkent, Uzbekistan	
Total	158 kg	Mai Al-Madani	11 September 2023	World Championships	Riyadh, Saudi Arabia	
76 kg
Snatch						
Clean & Jerk						
Total						
81 kg
Snatch	62 kg	Mai Almadani	27 April 2019	Asian Championships	Ningbo, China	
Clean & Jerk	80 kg	Mai Almadani	27 April 2019	Asian Championships	Ningbo, China	
Total	142 kg	Mai Almadani	27 April 2019	Asian Championships	Ningbo, China	
87 kg
Snatch						
Clean & Jerk						
Total						
+87 kg
Snatch	45 kg	Sara Almheiri	28 April 2019	Asian Championships	Ningbo, China	
Clean & Jerk	65 kg	Sara Almheiri	28 April 2019	Asian Championships	Ningbo, China	
Total	110 kg	Sara Almheiri	28 April 2019	Asian Championships	Ningbo, China	
