= List of Bangladeshi records in Olympic weightlifting =

The following are the national records in Olympic weightlifting in Bangladesh. Records are maintained in each weight class for the snatch lift, clean and jerk lift, and the total for both lifts by the Bangladesh Weightlifting Federation.

== Current records ==
=== Men ===
Event	Record	Athlete	Date	Meet	Place	Ref
60 kg
Snatch	104 kg	Toukir Hasan	24 September 2026	Asian Games	Nagoya, Japan	
Clean & Jerk	128 kg	Toukir Hasan	24 September 2026	Asian Games	Nagoya, Japan	
Total	232 kg	Toukir Hasan	24 September 2026	Asian Games	Nagoya, Japan	
65 kg
Snatch	105 kg	Baki Billah	9 November 2025	Islamic Solidarity Games	Riyadh, Saudi Arabia	
Clean & Jerk	135 kg	Baki Billah	9 November 2025	Islamic Solidarity Games	Riyadh, Saudi Arabia	
Total	240 kg	Baki Billah	9 November 2025	Islamic Solidarity Games	Riyadh, Saudi Arabia	
71 kg
Snatch						
Clean & Jerk						
Total						
79 kg
Snatch	117 kg	Sumon Roy	10 November 2025	Islamic Solidarity Games	Riyadh, Saudi Arabia	
Clean & Jerk	153 kg	Sumon Roy	10 November 2025	Islamic Solidarity Games	Riyadh, Saudi Arabia	
Total	270 kg	Sumon Roy	10 November 2025	Islamic Solidarity Games	Riyadh, Saudi Arabia	
88 kg
Snatch	120 kg	Pranto Shakayet	10 November 2025	Islamic Solidarity Games	Riyadh, Saudi Arabia	
Clean & Jerk	151 kg	Pranto Shakayet	10 November 2025	Islamic Solidarity Games	Riyadh, Saudi Arabia	
Total	271 kg	Pranto Shakayet	10 November 2025	Islamic Solidarity Games	Riyadh, Saudi Arabia	
94 kg
Snatch						
Clean & Jerk						
Total						
110 kg
Snatch						
Clean & Jerk						
Total						
+110 kg
Snatch						
Clean & Jerk						
Total						

=== Women ===
Event	Record	Athlete	Date	Meet	Place	Ref
48 kg
Snatch	64 kg	Mst Bristy	8 November 2025	Islamic Solidarity Games	Riyadh, Saudi Arabia	
Clean & Jerk	75 kg	Mst Bristy	8 November 2025	Islamic Solidarity Games	Riyadh, Saudi Arabia	
Total	139 kg	Mst Bristy	8 November 2025	Islamic Solidarity Games	Riyadh, Saudi Arabia	
53 kg
Snatch	68 kg	Marjia Akter Ekra	8 November 2025	Islamic Solidarity Games	Riyadh, Saudi Arabia	
Clean & Jerk	85 kg	Marjia Akter Ekra	8 November 2025	Islamic Solidarity Games	Riyadh, Saudi Arabia	
Total	153 kg	Marjia Akter Ekra	8 November 2025	Islamic Solidarity Games	Riyadh, Saudi Arabia	
58 kg
Snatch	77 kg	Sritey Akter	9 November 2025	Islamic Solidarity Games	Riyadh, Saudi Arabia	
Clean & Jerk						
Total						
63 kg
Snatch						
Clean & Jerk						
Total						
69 kg
Snatch	94 kg	Mabia Aktar	10 November 2025	Islamic Solidarity Games	Riyadh, Saudi Arabia	
Clean & Jerk	116 kg	Mabia Aktar	10 November 2025	Islamic Solidarity Games	Riyadh, Saudi Arabia	
Total	210 kg	Mabia Aktar	10 November 2025	Islamic Solidarity Games	Riyadh, Saudi Arabia	
77 kg
Snatch						
Clean & Jerk						
Total						
86 kg
Snatch						
Clean & Jerk						
Total						
+86 kg
Snatch						
Clean & Jerk						
Total						

== Historical records ==
=== Men (2018–2025) ===
Event	Record	Athlete	Date	Meet	Place	Ref
55 kg
Snatch	100 kg	Ashikur Rahman Taj	4 December 2023	IWF Grand Prix	Doha, Qatar	
Clean and Jerk	118 kg	Ashikur Rahman Taj	30 July 2022	Commonwealth Games	Marston Green, United Kingdom	
Total	212 kg	Ashikur Rahman Taj	4 December 2023	IWF Grand Prix	Doha, Qatar	
61 kg
Snatch	105 kg	Bella Mostain	5 December 2019	South Asian Games	Pokhara, Nepal	
Clean & Jerk	130 kg	Bella Mostain	5 December 2019	South Asian Games	Pokhara, Nepal	
Total	235 kg	Bella Mostain	5 December 2019	South Asian Games	Pokhara, Nepal	
67 kg
Snatch						
Clean & Jerk						
Total						
73 kg
Snatch	115 kg	Sheikh Nayem Hossain	3 October 2023	Asian Games	Hangzhou, China	
Clean & Jerk	140 kg	Sheikh Nayem Hossain	3 October 2023	Asian Games	Hangzhou, China	
Total	255 kg	Sheikh Nayem Hossain	3 October 2023	Asian Games	Hangzhou, China	
81 kg
Snatch	111 kg	Md Shohag Mia	10 September 2023	World Championships	Riyadh, Saudi Arabia	
Clean and Jerk	146 kg	Md Shohag Mia	10 September 2023	World Championships	Riyadh, Saudi Arabia	
Total	257 kg	Md Shohag Mia	10 September 2023	World Championships	Riyadh, Saudi Arabia	
89 kg
Snatch	125 kg	Pranto Shakayet	11 October 2022	Asian Championships	Manama, Bahrain	
Clean and Jerk	145 kg	Hossain Shakayet	6 December 2019	South Asian Games	Pokhara, Nepal	
Total	268 kg	Hossain Shakayet	6 December 2019	South Asian Games	Pokhara, Nepal	
96 kg
Snatch	125 kg	Rahman Ashikur	14 October 2022	Asian Championships	Manama, Bahrain	
Clean and Jerk	155 kg	Rahman Ashikur	14 October 2022	Asian Championships	Manama, Bahrain	
Total	280 kg	Rahman Ashikur	14 October 2022	Asian Championships	Manama, Bahrain	
102 kg
Snatch	123 kg	Jiarul Islam	24 April 2021	Asian Championships	Tashkent, Uzbekistan	
Clean and Jerk	142 kg	Islam Mainul	7 December 2019	South Asian Games	Pokhara, Nepal	
Total	264 kg	Jiarul Islam	24 April 2021	Asian Championships	Tashkent, Uzbekistan	
109 kg
Snatch	120 kg	Mohammad Abdullah Al Mumin	8 December 2019	South Asian Games	Pokhara, Nepal	
Clean and Jerk	147 kg	Mohammad Abdullah Al Mumin	8 December 2019	South Asian Games	Pokhara, Nepal	
Total	267 kg	Mohammad Abdullah Al Mumin	8 December 2019	South Asian Games	Pokhara, Nepal	
+109 kg
Snatch	120 kg	Ali Forhad	8 December 2019	South Asian Games	Pokhara, Nepal	
Clean and Jerk	143 kg	Ali Forhad	8 December 2019	South Asian Games	Pokhara, Nepal	
Total	263 kg	Ali Forhad	8 December 2019	South Asian Games	Pokhara, Nepal	

=== Women (2018–2025) ===
Event	Record	Athlete	Date	Meet	Place	Ref
45 kg
Snatch	55 kg	Akther Srity	5 December 2019	South Asian Games	Pokhara, Nepal	
Clean & Jerk	70 kg	Akther Srity	5 December 2019	South Asian Games	Pokhara, Nepal	
Total	125 kg	Akther Srity	5 December 2019	South Asian Games	Pokhara, Nepal	
49 kg
Snatch	58 kg	Marjia Akter Ekra	30 July 2022	Commonwealth Games	Marston Green, United Kingdom	
Clean & Jerk	75 kg	Shabira Molla	5 December 2019	South Asian Games	Pokhara, Nepal	
Total	130 kg	Shabira Molla	5 December 2019	South Asian Games	Pokhara, Nepal	
55 kg
Snatch	73 kg	Srity Akther	6 December 2023	IWF Grand Prix II	Doha, Qatar	
Clean & Jerk	95 kg	Srity Akther	6 December 2023	IWF Grand Prix II	Doha, Qatar	
Total	168 kg	Srity Akther	6 December 2023	IWF Grand Prix II	Doha, Qatar	
59 kg
Snatch	70 kg	Akther Fayema	5 December 2019	South Asian Games	Pokhara, Nepal	
Clean & Jerk	90 kg	Akther Fayema	5 December 2019	South Asian Games	Pokhara, Nepal	
Total	160 kg	Akther Fayema	5 December 2019	South Asian Games	Pokhara, Nepal	
64 kg
Snatch	78 kg	Mabia Aktar	1 August 2022	Commonwealth Games	Marston Green, United Kingdom	
Clean and Jerk	103 kg	Mabia Aktar	1 August 2022	Commonwealth Games	Marston Green, United Kingdom	
Total	181 kg	Mabia Aktar	1 August 2022	Commonwealth Games	Marston Green, United Kingdom	
71 kg
Snatch	79 kg	Mabia Akhter	12 October 2022	Asian Championships	Manama, Bahrain	
Clean and Jerk	104 kg	Mabia Akhter	12 October 2022	Asian Championships	Manama, Bahrain	
Total	183 kg	Mabia Akhter	12 October 2022	Asian Championships	Manama, Bahrain	
76 kg
Snatch	80 kg	Mabia Aktar	7 December 2019	South Asian Games	Pokhara, Nepal	
Clean and Jerk	106 kg	Mabia Aktar	22 December 2019	Qatar Cup	Doha, Qatar	
Total	186 kg	Mabia Aktar	22 December 2019	Qatar Cup	Doha, Qatar	
81 kg
Snatch	73 kg	Khaton Nisha Juhora	7 December 2019	South Asian Games	Pokhara, Nepal	
Clean and Jerk	95 kg	Khaton Nisha Juhora	7 December 2019	South Asian Games	Pokhara, Nepal	
Total	168 kg	Khaton Nisha Juhora	7 December 2019	South Asian Games	Pokhara, Nepal	
87 kg
Snatch	64 kg	Khatun Tania	15 October 2022	Asian Championships	Manama, Bahrain	
Clean and Jerk	75 kg	Khatun Tania	15 October 2022	Asian Championships	Manama, Bahrain	
Total	139 kg	Khatun Tania	15 October 2022	Asian Championships	Manama, Bahrain	
+87 kg
Snatch	64 kg	Sohayba Rahman Rafa	15 August 2022	Islamic Solidarity Games	Konya, Turkey	
Clean and Jerk	84 kg	Sohayba Rahman Rafa	15 August 2022	Islamic Solidarity Games	Konya, Turkey	
Total	148 kg	Sohayba Rahman Rafa	15 August 2022	Islamic Solidarity Games	Konya, Turkey	
