= Hanna Batsiushka =

Belarusian weightlifter (born 1981)

Personal information
- Born: October 24, 1981 (age 44)
Medal record
Women's Weightlifting
Representing Belarus
Olympic Games
Silver medal – second place	2004 Athens	– 63 kg
World Championships
Bronze medal – third place	2003 Vancouver	– 63 kg
European Championships
Silver medal – second place	2006 Wladyslawowo	– 63 kg
Bronze medal – third place	2007 Strasbourg	– 63 kg

Hanna Batsiushka (born October 24, 1981) is a Belarusian weightlifter.

She competed in the Women's 63 kg weight class at the 2004 Summer Olympics and won the silver medal, lifting 242.5 kg in total.

She set a new world record of 115 kg in snatch during the competition. Batsiushka was also the holder of the old record of 113.5 kg, which she achieved at the 2003 World Championships where she won the bronze.

She won another bronze at the 2007 European Weightlifting Championships in the 63 kg category. At the 2008 Summer Olympics she ranked 7th in the 69 kg category.
