= Tatsiana Stukalava =

Belarusian weightlifter (born 1975)

Medal record

Women's weightlifting

Representing Belarus

Olympic Games
Bronze medal – third place	2004 Athens	63 kg

Tatsiana Stukalava (born October 3, 1975 in Vitebsk) is a Belarusian weightlifter who competed in the Women's 63 kg weight class at the 2004 Summer Olympics and won the bronze medal, lifting 222.5 kg in total.
