= Hayet Sassi =

Tunisian weightlifter

Personal information
- Born: 24 October 1982 (age 42)
- Height: 170 cm (5 ft 7 in)
- Weight: 62.50 kg (137.8 lb)

Sport
- Country: Tunisia
- Sport: Weightlifting
- Weight class: 63 kg
- Team: National team
- Updated on 10 October 2016

Hayet Sassi (Arabic: حياة ساسي, born 24 October 1982) is a Tunisian former weightlifter, competing in the 63 kg category and representing Tunisia at international competitions.

She participated at the 2004 Summer Olympics in the 63 kg event. He set three Tunisian records in Olympic weightlifting: 95 kg in the snatch, 120 kg in the clean & jerk and a total of 215.0 kg.

== Major results ==
Year	Venue	Weight	Snatch (kg)				Clean & Jerk (kg)				Total	Rank
Year	Venue	Weight	1	2	3	Rank	1	2	3	Rank	Total	Rank
Summer Olympics
2004	Athens, Greece	63 kg				—				—	215.0	4
