= Ghada Hassine =

Tunisian weightlifter (born 1993)

Ghada Hassine (Arabic: غادة حسين; born 17 May 1993 in Sfax, Tunisia) is a Tunisian weightlifter. She competed at the 2012 Summer Olympics in the -69 kg event and finished tenth.
