= 2022 African Weightlifting Championships =

- Venue: Cairo Stadium – Hall 3
- Location: Cairo, Egypt
- Dates: 28–31 October
- Competitors: 58 from 12 nations

The 2022 African Weightlifting Championships were held in Cairo, Egypt from 28 to 31 October 2022. It were the 32nd men's and 21st women's championship and 1st African Clubs Weightlifting Championships.

== Medal summary ==
=== Men ===
https://iwf.sport/2022/12/03/the-ita-asserts-apparent-anti-doping-rule-violations-against-4-weightlifters-prior-to-the-iwf-world-championships/

Ahmed Emad Mohamed, IWF Anti-Doping Rules

Event	Gold		Silver		Bronze	
55 kg
Snatch	Mahmoud Sajir Jebali; Tunisia	93 kg	Not awarded			
Clean & Jerk	Mahmoud Sajir Jebali; Tunisia	120 kg	Not awarded			
Total	Mahmoud Sajir Jebali; Tunisia	213 kg	Not awarded			
61 kg
Snatch	Mohamed Aziz Ben Hadj; Tunisia	118 kg	Amine Bouhijbha; Tunisia	115 kg	Jelgib Elion Ndunyama; DR Congo	75 kg
Clean & Jerk	Amine Bouhijbha; Tunisia	140 kg	Mohamed Aziz Ben Hadj; Tunisia	135 kg	Jelgib Elion Ndunyama; DR Congo	90 kg
Total	Amine Bouhijbha; Tunisia	255 kg	Mohamed Aziz Ben Hadj; Tunisia	253 kg	Jelgib Elion Ndunyama; DR Congo	165 kg
67 kg
Snatch	Ahmed Nasar; Egypt	123 kg	Ayoub Salem; Tunisia	121 kg	Ihad Ibrahim; Egypt	120 kg
Clean & Jerk	Ahmed Nasar; Egypt	155 kg	Ihad Ibrahim; Egypt	150 kg	Ayoub Salem; Tunisia	140 kg
Total	Ahmed Nasar; Egypt	278 kg	Ihad Ibrahim; Egypt	280 kg	Ayoub Salem; Tunisia	261 kg
73 kg
Snatch	~~Ahmed Mohamed~~; ~~Egypt~~	150 kg	Ahsaan Shabi; Libya	137 kg	Gerard Abeussa; Cameroon	120 kg
Clean & Jerk	Mostafa Ibrahim; Egypt	180 kg	~~Ahmed Mohamed~~; ~~Egypt~~	180 kg	Ahsaan Shabi; Libya	171 kg
Total	~~Ahmed Mohamed~~; ~~Egypt~~	330 kg	Ahsaan Shabi; Libya	308 kg	Gerard Abeussa; Cameroon	280 kg
81 kg
Snatch	Islam Abulwafa; Egypt	150 kg	Hamza Ben Amor; Tunisia	136 kg	Mohamed Abdelmonem; Egypt	135 kg
Clean & Jerk	Islam Abulwafa; Egypt	185 kg	Mohamed Abdelmonem; Egypt	173 kg	Hamza Ben Amor; Tunisia	171 kg
Total	Islam Abulwafa; Egypt	335 kg	Mohamed Abdelmonem; Egypt	308 kg	Hamza Ben Amor; Tunisia	307 kg
89 kg
Snatch	Mahmoud Gamal; Egypt	151 kg	Omar Al-Ajeemi; Libya	138 kg	Daniel Onana Tanga; Cameroon	136 kg
Clean & Jerk	Mahmoud Gamal; Egypt	186 kg	Omar Al-Ajeemi; Libya	176 kg	Daniel Onana Tanga; Cameroon	160 kg
Total	Mahmoud Gamal; Egypt	337 kg	Omar Al-Ajeemi; Libya	314 kg	Daniel Onana Tanga; Cameroon	296 kg
96 kg
Snatch	Karim Abokahla; Egypt	145 kg	Ayoub Dridi; Tunisia	140 kg	Cédric Coret; Mauritius	120 kg
Clean & Jerk	Karim Abokahla; Egypt	195 kg	Ayoub Dridi; Tunisia	173 kg	Cédric Coret; Mauritius	150 kg
Total	Karim Abokahla; Egypt	340 kg	Ayoub Dridi; Tunisia	313 kg	Cédric Coret; Mauritius	270 kg
102 kg
Snatch	Gaber Farhan; Egypt	166 kg	Mohamed Selim; Egypt	165 kg	Ahmed Aduzriba; Libya	164 kg
Clean & Jerk	Ahmed Aduzriba; Libya	205 kg	Mohamed Selim; Egypt	203 kg	Junior Ngadja Nyabeyeu; Cameroon	199 kg
Total	Ahmed Aduzriba; Libya	369 kg	Mohamed Selim; Egypt	368 kg	Gaber Farhan; Egypt	356 kg
109 kg
Snatch	Khelwin Juboo; Mauritius	129 kg	Solomon Ocquaye; Ghana	128 kg	Not awarded	
Clean & Jerk	Khelwin Juboo; Mauritius	160 kg	Solomon Ocquaye; Ghana	152 kg	Not awarded	
Total	Khelwin Juboo; Mauritius	289 kg	Solomon Ocquaye; Ghana	280 kg	Not awarded	
+109 kg
Snatch	No contestants					
Clean & Jerk	No contestants					
Total	No contestants					

=== Women ===
Event	Gold		Silver		Bronze	
45 kg
Snatch	No contestants					
Clean & Jerk	No contestants					
Total	No contestants					
49 kg
Snatch	Habiba Saad; Egypt	71 kg	Not awarded			
Clean & Jerk	Habiba Saad; Egypt	80 kg	Not awarded			
Total	Habiba Saad; Egypt	151 kg	Not awarded			
55 kg
Snatch	Noura Essam; Egypt	80 kg	Souhir Khemiri; Tunisia	68 kg	Nawal Uwase; Rwanda	25 kg
Clean & Jerk	Noura Essam; Egypt	94 kg	Souhir Khemiri; Tunisia	93 kg	Nawal Uwase; Rwanda	40 kg
Total	Noura Essam; Egypt	174 kg	Souhir Khemiri; Tunisia	161 kg	Nawal Uwase; Rwanda	65 kg
59 kg
Snatch	Nouha Landoulsi; Tunisia	89 kg	Ghofrane Belkhir; Tunisia	86 kg	Basma Ibrahim; Egypt	83 kg
Clean & Jerk	Ghofrane Belkhir; Tunisia	113 kg	Basma Ibrahim; Egypt	108 kg	Nouha Landoulsi; Tunisia	107 kg
Total	Ghofrane Belkhir; Tunisia	199 kg	Nouha Landoulsi; Tunisia	196 kg	Basma Ibrahim; Egypt	191 kg
64 kg
Snatch	Chaima Rahmouni; Tunisia	86 kg	Not awarded			
Clean & Jerk	Chaima Rahmouni; Tunisia	110 kg	Not awarded			
Total	Chaima Rahmouni; Tunisia	196 kg	Not awarded			
71 kg
Snatch	Neama Said; Egypt	104 kg	Ketty Lent; Mauritius	85 kg	Laryne Jefferies; South Africa	84 kg
Clean & Jerk	Neama Said; Egypt	123 kg	Ketty Lent; Mauritius	111 kg	Laryne Jefferies; South Africa	104 kg
Total	Neama Said; Egypt	227 kg	Ketty Lent; Mauritius	196 kg	Laryne Jefferies; South Africa	188 kg
76 kg
Snatch	Roufida Fathi; Egypt	90 kg	Joelita Coloma; Seychelles	80 kg	Not awarded	
Clean & Jerk	Roufida Fathi; Egypt	120 kg	Joelita Coloma; Seychelles	100 kg	Not awarded	
Total	Roufida Fathi; Egypt	210 kg	Joelita Coloma; Seychelles	180 kg	Not awarded	
81 kg
Snatch	Sara Ahmed; Egypt	116 kg AF	Fatma Sadek; Egypt	98 kg	Jeanne Eyenga; Cameroon	97 kg
Clean & Jerk	Sara Ahmed; Egypt	145 kg AF	Fatma Sadek; Egypt	124 kg	Jeanne Eyenga; Cameroon	123 kg
Total	Sara Ahmed; Egypt	261 kg AF	Fatma Sadek; Egypt	222 kg	Jeanne Eyenga; Cameroon	220 kg
87 kg
Snatch	Samar Habashy; Egypt	105 kg	Phalone Leticia Nzimo; Cameroon	80 kg	Alison Sunee; Mauritius	78 kg
Clean & Jerk	Samar Habashy; Egypt	130 kg	Phalone Leticia Nzimo; Cameroon	105 kg	Alison Sunee; Mauritius	104 kg
Total	Samar Habashy; Egypt	235 kg	Phalone Leticia Nzimo; Cameroon	185 kg	Alison Sunee; Mauritius	182 kg
+87 kg
Snatch	Halima Abdelazim; Egypt	124 kg AF	Shaimaa Khalaf; Egypt	90 kg	Romantha Larue; Seychelles	87 kg
Clean & Jerk	Halima Abdelazim; Egypt	145 kg	Shaimaa Khalaf; Egypt	112 kg	Romantha Larue; Seychelles	111 kg
Total	Halima Abdelazim; Egypt	269 kg	Shaimaa Khalaf; Egypt	202 kg	Romantha Larue; Seychelles	198 kg

== Medal table ==
Ahmed Emad Mohamed DSQ

Ranking by Big (Total result) medals

* Host nation (Egypt)

Rank	Nation	Gold	Silver	Bronze	Total
1	Egypt*	12	5	2	19
2	Tunisia	4	4	2	10
3	Libya	1	2	0	3
4	Mauritius	1	1	2	4
5	Cameroon	0	1	3	4
6	Seychelles	0	1	1	2
7	Ghana	0	1	0	1
8	DR Congo	0	0	1	1
8	Rwanda	0	0	1	1
8	South Africa	0	0	1	1
Totals (10 entries)		18	15	13	46

Ranking by all medals: Big (Total result) and Small (Snatch and Clean & Jerk)

* Host nation (Egypt)

Rank	Nation	Gold	Silver	Bronze	Total
1	Egypt*	35	13	4	52
2	Tunisia	12	13	5	30
3	Mauritius	3	3	6	12
4	Libya	2	6	1	9
5	Cameroon	0	3	11	14
6	Seychelles	0	3	3	6
7	Ghana	0	3	0	3
8	DR Congo	0	0	3	3
8	Rwanda	0	0	3	3
8	South Africa	0	0	3	3
Totals (10 entries)		52	44	39	135

== Participating nations ==
12 national teams took part in the competition.

- Cameroon (5)
- Democratic Republic of the Congo (2)
- Egypt (19)
- Ghana (2)
- Libya (3)
- Mauritius (7)
- Rwanda (2)
- Seychelles (3)
- South Africa (1)
- Sudan (2)
- Tunisia (10)
- Zambia (2)
