= Weightlifting at the 2004 Summer Olympics – Women's 63 kg =

Weightlifting at the Olympics

Women's 63 kg at the Games of the XXVIII Olympiad
- Venue: Nikaia Olympic Weightlifting Hall
- Date: 18 August 2004
- Competitors: 9 from 8 nations

Medalists
1st place, gold medalist(s)		Nataliya Skakun	Ukraine
2nd place, silver medalist(s)		Hanna Batsiushka	Belarus
3rd place, bronze medalist(s)		Tatsiana Stukalava	Belarus

The women's 63 kilograms weightlifting event at the 2004 Summer Olympics in Athens, Greece took place at the Nikaia Olympic Weightlifting Hall on 18 August.

Total score was the sum of the lifter's best result in each of the snatch and the clean and jerk, with three lifts allowed for each lift. In case of a tie, the lighter lifter won; if still tied, the lifter who took the fewest attempts to achieve the total score won. Lifters without a valid snatch score did not perform the clean and jerk.

== Schedule ==
All times are Eastern European Summer Time (UTC+03:00)

Date	Time	Event
18 August 2004	16:30	Group A

== Records ==
{{{caption}}}
World Record	Snatch	Hanna Batsiushka (BLR)	113.5 kg	Vancouver, Canada	18 November 2003
World Record	Clean & Jerk	Nataliya Skakun (UKR)	138.0 kg	Vancouver, Canada	18 November 2003
World Record	Total	Liu Xia (CHN)	247.5 kg	Qinhuangdao, China	12 September 2003
Olympic Record	Snatch	Chen Xiaomin (CHN)	112.5 kg	Sydney, Australia	19 September 2000
Olympic Record	Clean & Jerk	Olympic Standard	132.5 kg	—	1 January 1997
Olympic Record	Total	Chen Xiaomin (CHN)	242.5 kg	Sydney, Australia	19 September 2000

== Results ==
Rank	Athlete	Group	Body weight	Snatch (kg)				Clean & Jerk (kg)				Total
Rank	Athlete	Group	Body weight	1	2	3	Result	1	2	3	Result	Total
1st place, gold medalist(s)	Nataliya Skakun (UKR)	A	61.59	100.0	105.0	107.5	107.5	125.0	135.0	—	135.0	242.5
2nd place, silver medalist(s)	Hanna Batsiushka (BLR)	A	62.87	105.0	110.0	115.0	115.0	~~120.0~~	120.0	127.5	127.5	242.5
3rd place, bronze medalist(s)	Tatsiana Stukalava (BLR)	A	62.90	95.0	~~100.0~~	100.0	100.0	115.0	120.0	122.5	122.5	222.5
4	Hayet Sassi (TUN)	A	62.50	95.0	~~100.0~~	~~100.0~~	95.0	~~120.0~~	~~120.0~~	120.0	120.0	215.0
5	Kim Soo-kyung (KOR)	A	62.96	~~92.5~~	92.5	~~97.5~~	92.5	122.5	~~132.5~~	~~132.5~~	122.5	215.0
6	Nguyễn Thị Thiết (VIE)	A	61.15	85.0	90.0	95.0	95.0	110.0	~~115.0~~	~~117.5~~	110.0	205.0
7	Leila Lassouani (ALG)	A	62.47	85.0	~~90.0~~	~~92.5~~	85.0	115.0	~~120.0~~	~~120.0~~	115.0	200.0
—	Anastasia Tsakiri (GRE)	A	62.08	~~97.5~~	~~97.5~~	97.5	97.5	~~117.5~~	~~117.5~~	~~117.5~~	—	—
—	Karnam Malleswari (IND)	A	62.83	~~100.0~~	—	—	—	—	—	—	—	—

== New records ==
Snatch	115.0 kg	Hanna Batsiushka (BLR)	WR
Clean & Jerk	135.0 kg	Nataliya Skakun (UKR)	OR
