= Weightlifting at the 2021 Islamic Solidarity Games – Results =

These are the results of the Weightlifting competition at the 2021 Islamic Solidarity Games which took place from 11 to 15 August 2022 in Konya, Turkey.

== Men ==
=== 55 kg ===
11 August

| Rank | Athlete | Group | Snatch (kg) | | | | Clean & Jerk (kg) | | | | Total |
| Rank | Athlete | Group | 1 | 2 | 3 | Rank | 1 | 2 | 3 | Rank | Total |
|---|---|---|---|---|---|---|---|---|---|---|---|
| 1st place, gold medalist(s) | Arli Chontey (KAZ) | A | 108 | 111 | 114 | 2nd place, silver medalist(s) | 133 | 136 | 139 | 1st place, gold medalist(s) | 253 |
| 2nd place, silver medalist(s) | Mansour Al-Saleem (KSA) | A | 110 | ~~115~~ | 115 | 1st place, gold medalist(s) | 133 | ~~137~~ | 137 | 2nd place, silver medalist(s) | 252 |
| 3rd place, bronze medalist(s) | Satrio Adi Nugroho (INA) | A | ~~105~~ | 105 | 110 | 3rd place, bronze medalist(s) | ~~134~~ | ~~134~~ | 134 | 3rd place, bronze medalist(s) | 244 |
| 4 | Muammer Şahin (TUR) | A | 105 | 109 | ~~111~~ | 4 | 120 | 125 | ~~130~~ | 4 | 234 |
| 5 | Davis Niyoyita (UGA) | A | 90 | ~~100~~ | ~~100~~ | 5 | 115 | 120 | ~~125~~ | 5 | 210 |

=== 61 kg ===
12 August

| Rank | Athlete | Group | Snatch (kg) | | | | Clean & Jerk (kg) | | | | Total |
| Rank | Athlete | Group | 1 | 2 | 3 | Rank | 1 | 2 | 3 | Rank | Total |
|---|---|---|---|---|---|---|---|---|---|---|---|
| 1st place, gold medalist(s) | Ricko Saputra (INA) | A | 124 | 126 | 128 | 1st place, gold medalist(s) | 153 | 156 | 163 | 1st place, gold medalist(s) | 291 |
| 2nd place, silver medalist(s) | Seraj Al-Saleem (KSA) | A | ~~122~~ | ~~123~~ | 123 | 2nd place, silver medalist(s) | 150 | 154 | ~~162~~ | 2nd place, silver medalist(s) | 277 |
| 3rd place, bronze medalist(s) | Otepbergen Aliyev (KAZ) | A | 115 | 120 | ~~123~~ | 4 | 145 | 151 | ~~155~~ | 3rd place, bronze medalist(s) | 271 |
| 4 | Ferdi Hardal (TUR) | A | ~~122~~ | 122 | ~~125~~ | 3rd place, bronze medalist(s) | 148 | ~~152~~ | ~~152~~ | 4 | 270 |
| 5 | Ihtiýor Matkerimow (TKM) | A | ~~117~~ | ~~117~~ | 117 | 5 | ~~143~~ | ~~143~~ | 143 | 6 | 260 |
| 6 | Tehran Mammadov (AZE) | A | 116 | ~~121~~ | ~~121~~ | 6 | 135 | 141 | ~~145~~ | 8 | 257 |
| 7 | Amor Fenni (ALG) | A | 110 | 115 | ~~118~~ | 7 | 137 | 142 | ~~145~~ | 7 | 257 |
| 8 | Ishimbek Muratbek Uulu (KGZ) | A | 105 | ~~110~~ | 110 | 8 | 140 | 147 | ~~153~~ | 5 | 257 |

=== 67 kg ===
12 August

| Rank | Athlete | Group | Snatch (kg) | | | | Clean & Jerk (kg) | | | | Total |
| Rank | Athlete | Group | 1 | 2 | 3 | Rank | 1 | 2 | 3 | Rank | Total |
|---|---|---|---|---|---|---|---|---|---|---|---|
| 1st place, gold medalist(s) | Adkhamjon Ergashev (UZB) | A | 133 | 138 | 141 | 1st place, gold medalist(s) | 168 | ~~173~~ | 173 | 2nd place, silver medalist(s) | 314 |
| 2nd place, silver medalist(s) | Doston Yokubov (UZB) | A | 134 | ~~138~~ | ~~139~~ | 5 | ~~171~~ | 171 | ~~175~~ | 4 | 305 |
| 3rd place, bronze medalist(s) | Yusuf Fehmi Genç (TUR) | A | 125 | 131 | ~~133~~ | 7 | ~~165~~ | 170 | 174 | 1st place, gold medalist(s) | 305 |
| 4 | Mohammad Yasin (INA) | A | 130 | 137 | 140 | 2nd place, silver medalist(s) | 160 | ~~167~~ | ~~169~~ | 7 | 300 |
| 5 | Hafez Ghashghaei (IRI) | A | 120 | 127 | ~~132~~ | 9 | 162 | 172 | ~~175~~ | 3rd place, bronze medalist(s) | 299 |
| 6 | Kaan Kahriman (TUR) | A | 130 | 135 | 138 | 3rd place, bronze medalist(s) | 150 | 158 | ~~161~~ | 8 | 296 |
| 7 | Nawaf Al-Mazyadi (KSA) | A | 129 | ~~134~~ | 136 | 4 | 160 | ~~167~~ | ~~171~~ | 6 | 296 |
| 8 | Isa Rustamov (AZE) | A | 127 | 132 | ~~136~~ | 6 | ~~160~~ | ~~160~~ | 161 | 5 | 293 |
| 9 | Hydyrberdi Ýagmyrow (TKM) | A | 124 | 128 | ~~132~~ | 8 | 148 | 155 | ~~159~~ | 10 | 283 |
| 10 | Elyas Al-Busaidi (OMA) | A | 115 | ~~121~~ | ~~121~~ | 10 | ~~156~~ | 156 | ~~167~~ | 9 | 271 |
| 11 | Ibrahim Al-Fararjeh (JOR) | A | 96 | 102 | ~~105~~ | 11 | ~~110~~ | 115 | 120 | 12 | 222 |
| 12 | Khaled Al-Qasimi (UAE) | A | 95 | ~~100~~ | ~~100~~ | 12 | 115 | 120 | ~~122~~ | 11 | 215 |
| 13 | Muzamiru Bukenya (UGA) | A | 80 | 86 | 90 | 13 | 105 | 111 | ~~118~~ | 13 | 201 |

=== 73 kg ===
13 August

| Rank | Athlete | Group | Snatch (kg) | | | | Clean & Jerk (kg) | | | | Total |
| Rank | Athlete | Group | 1 | 2 | 3 | Rank | 1 | 2 | 3 | Rank | Total |
|---|---|---|---|---|---|---|---|---|---|---|---|
| 1st place, gold medalist(s) | Rizki Juniansyah (INA) | A | 150 | ~~155~~ | ~~160~~ | 1st place, gold medalist(s) | 181 | 190 | ~~195~~ | 1st place, gold medalist(s) | 340 |
| 2nd place, silver medalist(s) | Alexey Churkin (KAZ) | A | 140 | 145 | ~~150~~ | 2nd place, silver medalist(s) | 170 | ~~180~~ | ~~180~~ | 2nd place, silver medalist(s) | 315 |
| 3rd place, bronze medalist(s) | Abdulrahman Al-Beladi (KSA) | A | 125 | 130 | ~~135~~ | 3rd place, bronze medalist(s) | 158 | 166 | ~~171~~ | 3rd place, bronze medalist(s) | 296 |
| 4 | Pasha Ibrahimli (AZE) | A | 128 | ~~132~~ | ~~136~~ | 4 | 159 | ~~164~~ | ~~165~~ | 4 | 287 |
| 5 | Ayoub Salem (TUN) | A | 110 | 114 | 119 | 5 | 135 | ~~140~~ | ~~143~~ | 5 | 254 |
| 6 | Ilkhomjon Shukurov (TJK) | A | 95 | 100 | ~~105~~ | 6 | 115 | 120 | 130 | 6 | 230 |

=== 81 kg ===
13 August

| Rank | Athlete | Group | Snatch (kg) | | | | Clean & Jerk (kg) | | | | Total |
| Rank | Athlete | Group | 1 | 2 | 3 | Rank | 1 | 2 | 3 | Rank | Total |
|---|---|---|---|---|---|---|---|---|---|---|---|
| 1st place, gold medalist(s) | Mirmostafa Javadi (IRI) | A | 156 | 163 | ~~165~~ | 2nd place, silver medalist(s) | 194 | 201 | ~~209~~ | 1st place, gold medalist(s) | 364 |
| 2nd place, silver medalist(s) | Rahmat Erwin Abdullah (INA) | A | 148 | 154 | 158 | 4 | 191 | 197 | ~~200~~ | 2nd place, silver medalist(s) | 355 |
| 3rd place, bronze medalist(s) | Mukhammadkodir Toshtemirov (UZB) | A | 157 | 160 | 164 | 1st place, gold medalist(s) | 186 | 190 | ~~193~~ | 4 | 354 |
| 4 | Hossein Soltani (IRI) | A | 152 | 158 | ~~161~~ | 3rd place, bronze medalist(s) | ~~186~~ | ~~186~~ | 192 | 3rd place, bronze medalist(s) | 350 |
| 5 | Celil Erdoğdu (TUR) | A | ~~145~~ | 145 | 153 | 5 | 175 | 182 | 186 | 5 | 339 |
| 6 | Yelaman Seitkazy (KAZ) | A | 146 | ~~151~~ | 151 | 7 | 185 | ~~192~~ | ~~193~~ | 6 | 336 |
| 7 | Muhammet Döwranow (TKM) | A | ~~147~~ | 147 | ~~152~~ | 8 | 183 | ~~188~~ | ~~193~~ | 7 | 330 |
| 8 | Batuhan Yüksel (TUR) | A | 140 | 146 | 151 | 6 | 170 | ~~181~~ | ~~182~~ | 10 | 321 |
| 9 | Ali Al-Alawi (KSA) | B | 130 | 135 | 138 | 9 | 162 | 170 | ~~175~~ | 9 | 308 |
| 10 | Fugan Aliyev (AZE) | B | 130 | ~~135~~ | 135 | 11 | 166 | 171 | ~~175~~ | 8 | 306 |
| 11 | Michel Ngongang (CMR) | B | 127 | 131 | 134 | 12 | 158 | 162 | 167 | 11 | 301 |
| 12 | Haider Ali (PAK) | B | 125 | ~~135~~ | 135 | 10 | 160 | ~~170~~ | ~~173~~ | 12 | 295 |
| 13 | Ahmed Valdy Njoya (CMR) | B | ~~120~~ | 125 | 130 | 14 | 152 | 160 | ~~166~~ | 13 | 290 |
| 14 | Hamza Ben Amor (TUN) | B | 125 | 128 | 132 | 13 | 155 | ~~161~~ | ~~163~~ | 14 | 287 |
| 15 | Ahmad Mohammed Mustafa (UAE) | B | 95 | ~~100~~ | 100 | 15 | 120 | ~~125~~ | 125 | 15 | 225 |
| 16 | Nasreldien Adam (SUD) | B | 70 | 80 | 84 | 16 | 90 | 100 | ~~110~~ | 16 | 184 |

=== 89 kg ===
14 August

| Rank | Athlete | Group | Snatch (kg) | | | | Clean & Jerk (kg) | | | | Total |
| Rank | Athlete | Group | 1 | 2 | 3 | Rank | 1 | 2 | 3 | Rank | Total |
|---|---|---|---|---|---|---|---|---|---|---|---|
| 1st place, gold medalist(s) | Sarvarbek Zafarjonov (UZB) | A | 161 | 164 | 167 | 1st place, gold medalist(s) | 193 | 196 | 199 | 1st place, gold medalist(s) | 366 |
| 2nd place, silver medalist(s) | Emil Moldodosov (KGZ) | A | 157 | 161 | ~~163~~ | 3rd place, bronze medalist(s) | 187 | ~~193~~ | 193 | 3rd place, bronze medalist(s) | 354 |
| 3rd place, bronze medalist(s) | Assylzhan Bektay (KAZ) | A | 154 | 158 | 162 | 2nd place, silver medalist(s) | ~~190~~ | 191 | ~~195~~ | 5 | 353 |
| 4 | Amur Al-Khanjari (OMA) | A | 150 | ~~156~~ | 156 | 6 | 194 | ~~198~~ | ~~200~~ | 2nd place, silver medalist(s) | 350 |
| 5 | Sergey Petrovich (KAZ) | A | ~~156~~ | ~~156~~ | 156 | 7 | ~~190~~ | 190 | ~~199~~ | 6 | 346 |
| 6 | Ulaş Can Kurnaz (TUR) | A | 145 | 151 | ~~158~~ | 9 | 183 | 191 | ~~195~~ | 4 | 342 |
| 7 | Hakan Şükrü Kurnaz (TUR) | A | 156 | ~~159~~ | ~~159~~ | 5 | 175 | 180 | ~~183~~ | 7 | 336 |
| 8 | Kamran Ismayilov (AZE) | A | 136 | ~~140~~ | 141 | 10 | 165 | 170 | ~~175~~ | 8 | 311 |
| 9 | Cédric Feugno (CMR) | A | 135 | 140 | ~~145~~ | 11 | 165 | ~~171~~ | ~~171~~ | 9 | 305 |
| — | Şatlyk Şöhradow (TKM) | A | 157 | ~~162~~ | ~~163~~ | 4 | ~~188~~ | ~~188~~ | ~~190~~ | — | NM |
| — | Muhammad Zul Ilmi (INA) | A | 145 | 150 | 155 | 8 | ~~185~~ | ~~185~~ | ~~185~~ | — | NM |
| — | Hussain Al-Majed (KSA) | A | 120 | ~~132~~ | — | 12 | — | — | — | — | NM |

=== 96 kg ===
14 August

| Rank | Athlete | Group | Snatch (kg) | | | | Clean & Jerk (kg) | | | | Total |
| Rank | Athlete | Group | 1 | 2 | 3 | Rank | 1 | 2 | 3 | Rank | Total |
|---|---|---|---|---|---|---|---|---|---|---|---|
| 1st place, gold medalist(s) | Reza Beiranvand (IRI) | A | 163 | 167 | ~~170~~ | 1st place, gold medalist(s) | 194 | ~~205~~ | ~~205~~ | 1st place, gold medalist(s) | 361 |
| 2nd place, silver medalist(s) | Sunnatilla Usarov (UZB) | A | 159 | 164 | ~~168~~ | 3rd place, bronze medalist(s) | 190 | ~~193~~ | ~~193~~ | 3rd place, bronze medalist(s) | 354 |
| 3rd place, bronze medalist(s) | Ali Al-Othman (KSA) | A | 150 | 157 | ~~162~~ | 5 | ~~192~~ | ~~192~~ | 192 | 2nd place, silver medalist(s) | 349 |
| 4 | Döwranbek Hasanbaýew (TKM) | A | ~~164~~ | ~~164~~ | 165 | 2nd place, silver medalist(s) | 183 | ~~188~~ | ~~190~~ | 5 | 348 |
| 5 | Kirill Staroverkin (KAZ) | A | 150 | 155 | 158 | 4 | 180 | 186 | ~~191~~ | 4 | 344 |
| 6 | Salah Hamed (SUD) | A | 96 | ~~103~~ | ~~103~~ | 6 | 110 | ~~116~~ | ~~116~~ | 6 | 206 |

=== 102 kg ===
15 August

| Rank | Athlete | Group | Snatch (kg) | | | | Clean & Jerk (kg) | | | | Total |
| Rank | Athlete | Group | 1 | 2 | 3 | Rank | 1 | 2 | 3 | Rank | Total |
|---|---|---|---|---|---|---|---|---|---|---|---|
| 1st place, gold medalist(s) | Rasoul Motamedi (IRI) | A | 171 | ~~175~~ | 177 | 1st place, gold medalist(s) | 217 | 223 | ~~232~~ | 1st place, gold medalist(s) | 400 |
| 2nd place, silver medalist(s) | Artyom Antropov (KAZ) | A | 160 | 164 | ~~167~~ | 6 | 215 | 222 | ~~225~~ | 2nd place, silver medalist(s) | 386 |
| 3rd place, bronze medalist(s) | Bekdoolot Rasulbekov (KGZ) | A | ~~163~~ | 163 | 169 | 4 | 209 | 216 | ~~221~~ | 3rd place, bronze medalist(s) | 385 |
| 4 | Dadash Dadashbayli (AZE) | A | 171 | 174 | ~~177~~ | 2nd place, silver medalist(s) | 203 | 210 | ~~215~~ | 5 | 384 |
| 5 | Amir Hoghoughi (IRI) | A | 165 | ~~171~~ | ~~173~~ | 5 | 202 | 211 | ~~217~~ | 4 | 376 |
| 6 | Sharofiddin Amriddinov (UZB) | A | 163 | 168 | 172 | 3rd place, bronze medalist(s) | 191 | 198 | ~~201~~ | 7 | 370 |
| 7 | Ali Al-Khazal (KSA) | A | 161 | ~~165~~ | ~~166~~ | 8 | 193 | 200 | ~~205~~ | 6 | 361 |
| 8 | Aymen Touairi (ALG) | A | 156 | 162 | ~~166~~ | 7 | 197 | ~~202~~ | — | 8 | 359 |
| 9 | Onur Demirci (TUR) | A | 152 | ~~157~~ | ~~161~~ | 9 | 181 | ~~190~~ | ~~190~~ | 9 | 333 |
| 10 | Patrick Barde (NGR) | A | 130 | ~~135~~ | 140 | 10 | 165 | ~~170~~ | ~~170~~ | 10 | 305 |

=== 109 kg ===
15 August

| Rank | Athlete | Group | Snatch (kg) | | | | Clean & Jerk (kg) | | | | Total |
| Rank | Athlete | Group | 1 | 2 | 3 | Rank | 1 | 2 | 3 | Rank | Total |
|---|---|---|---|---|---|---|---|---|---|---|---|
| 1st place, gold medalist(s) | Ruslan Nurudinov (UZB) | A | 177 | 182 | 187 | 1st place, gold medalist(s) | 220 | 230 | — | 1st place, gold medalist(s) | 417 |
| 2nd place, silver medalist(s) | Peyman Jan (IRI) | A | ~~165~~ | 166 | ~~170~~ | 3rd place, bronze medalist(s) | 201 | 206 | 216 | 2nd place, silver medalist(s) | 382 |
| 3rd place, bronze medalist(s) | Mehdi Karami (IRI) | A | 163 | 167 | 173 | 2nd place, silver medalist(s) | 201 | ~~206~~ | 207 | 3rd place, bronze medalist(s) | 380 |
| 4 | Junior Ngadja Nyabeyeu (CMR) | A | 157 | 162 | 165 | 4 | 200 | ~~205~~ | 205 | 4 | 370 |
| 5 | Ali Shukurlu (AZE) | A | 152 | 156 | 160 | 5 | 183 | ~~191~~ | ~~191~~ | 5 | 343 |
| 6 | Hanzala Dastgir Butt (PAK) | A | 140 | 146 | ~~150~~ | 6 | 175 | 183 | ~~188~~ | 6 | 329 |
| 7 | Taner Çağlar (TUR) | A | 145 | ~~151~~ | ~~151~~ | 7 | 180 | ~~185~~ | ~~186~~ | 7 | 325 |

=== +109 kg ===
15 August

| Rank | Athlete | Group | Snatch (kg) | | | | Clean & Jerk (kg) | | | | Total |
| Rank | Athlete | Group | 1 | 2 | 3 | Rank | 1 | 2 | 3 | Rank | Total |
|---|---|---|---|---|---|---|---|---|---|---|---|
| 1st place, gold medalist(s) | Akbar Djuraev (UZB) | A | ~~190~~ | 190 | 200 | 1st place, gold medalist(s) | 231 | 242 | 246 | 1st place, gold medalist(s) | 446 |
| 2nd place, silver medalist(s) | Alireza Yousefi (IRI) | A | 170 | 176 | 181 | 3rd place, bronze medalist(s) | 230 | ~~241~~ | ~~241~~ | 2nd place, silver medalist(s) | 411 |
| 3rd place, bronze medalist(s) | Hojamuhammet Toýçyýew (TKM) | A | 175 | 180 | 184 | 2nd place, silver medalist(s) | ~~215~~ | 215 | 225 | 3rd place, bronze medalist(s) | 409 |
| 4 | Nooh Dastgir Butt (PAK) | A | 162 | ~~170~~ | — | 4 | 216 | ~~226~~ | ~~226~~ | 4 | 378 |
| 5 | Hassan Al-Radhi (KSA) | A | 150 | 157 | 161 | 5 | 191 | 200 | ~~205~~ | 5 | 361 |

== Women ==
=== 45 kg ===
11 August

| Rank | Athlete | Group | Snatch (kg) | | | | Clean & Jerk (kg) | | | | Total |
| Rank | Athlete | Group | 1 | 2 | 3 | Rank | 1 | 2 | 3 | Rank | Total |
|---|---|---|---|---|---|---|---|---|---|---|---|
| 1st place, gold medalist(s) | Siti Nafisatul Hariroh (INA) | A | 66 | 69 | 71 | 1st place, gold medalist(s) | 85 | 88 | ~~91~~ | 1st place, gold medalist(s) | 159 |
| 2nd place, silver medalist(s) | Cansu Bektaş (TUR) | A | 65 | ~~68~~ | ~~70~~ | 2nd place, silver medalist(s) | 80 | 86 | ~~89~~ | 2nd place, silver medalist(s) | 151 |
| 3rd place, bronze medalist(s) | Nazila Ismayilova (AZE) | A | ~~50~~ | 50 | 54 | 3rd place, bronze medalist(s) | 60 | 64 | 67 | 3rd place, bronze medalist(s) | 121 |
| 4 | Ghadah Al-Tassan (KSA) | A | 41 | 43 | ~~45~~ | 4 | 53 | 56 | 59 | 4 | 102 |

=== 49 kg ===
11 August

| Rank | Athlete | Group | Snatch (kg) | | | | Clean & Jerk (kg) | | | | Total |
| Rank | Athlete | Group | 1 | 2 | 3 | Rank | 1 | 2 | 3 | Rank | Total |
|---|---|---|---|---|---|---|---|---|---|---|---|
| 1st place, gold medalist(s) | Duygu Alıcı (TUR) | A | 74 | 76 | 78 | 1st place, gold medalist(s) | 94 | ~~97~~ | ~~98~~ | 1st place, gold medalist(s) | 172 |
| 2nd place, silver medalist(s) | Şaziye Erdoğan (TUR) | A | 73 | 75 | 77 | 2nd place, silver medalist(s) | 93 | ~~96~~ | ~~96~~ | 2nd place, silver medalist(s) | 170 |
| 3rd place, bronze medalist(s) | Ýulduz Jumabaýewa (TKM) | A | ~~74~~ | 74 | ~~77~~ | 3rd place, bronze medalist(s) | 93 | ~~97~~ | ~~99~~ | 3rd place, bronze medalist(s) | 167 |
| 4 | Monerah Al-Rowitea (KSA) | A | 42 | 45 | 47 | 5 | 55 | 58 | 61 | 4 | 108 |
| — | Bägül Berdiýewa (TKM) | A | ~~65~~ | 65 | 68 | 4 | ~~85~~ | — | — | — | NM |

=== 55 kg ===
12 August

| Rank | Athlete | Group | Snatch (kg) | | | | Clean & Jerk (kg) | | | | Total |
| Rank | Athlete | Group | 1 | 2 | 3 | Rank | 1 | 2 | 3 | Rank | Total |
|---|---|---|---|---|---|---|---|---|---|---|---|
| 1st place, gold medalist(s) | Natasya Beteyob (INA) | A | ~~84~~ | ~~84~~ | 84 | 2nd place, silver medalist(s) | 102 | 104 | 111 | 1st place, gold medalist(s) | 195 |
| 2nd place, silver medalist(s) | Kristina Şermetowa (TKM) | A | 85 | 87 | 89 | 1st place, gold medalist(s) | 103 | 105 | ~~111~~ | 2nd place, silver medalist(s) | 194 |
| 3rd place, bronze medalist(s) | Poupak Basami (IRI) | A | 69 | 71 | ~~75~~ | 3rd place, bronze medalist(s) | 87 | 94 | ~~101~~ | 3rd place, bronze medalist(s) | 165 |
| 4 | Srity Akter (BAN) | A | 65 | 68 | 70 | 4 | 84 | ~~86~~ | 86 | 4 | 156 |

=== 59 kg ===
12 August

| Rank | Athlete | Group | Snatch (kg) | | | | Clean & Jerk (kg) | | | | Total |
| Rank | Athlete | Group | 1 | 2 | 3 | Rank | 1 | 2 | 3 | Rank | Total |
|---|---|---|---|---|---|---|---|---|---|---|---|
| 1st place, gold medalist(s) | Zulfiya Chinshanlo (KAZ) | A | 90 | 93 | 95 | 1st place, gold medalist(s) | 115 | 125 | ~~130~~ | 1st place, gold medalist(s) | 220 |
| 2nd place, silver medalist(s) | Adijat Olarinoye (NGR) | A | 90 | 92 | ~~94~~ | 2nd place, silver medalist(s) | 110 | ~~113~~ | ~~113~~ | 3rd place, bronze medalist(s) | 202 |
| 3rd place, bronze medalist(s) | Nelly (INA) | A | 82 | ~~86~~ | 86 | 4 | 105 | ~~111~~ | 111 | 2nd place, silver medalist(s) | 197 |
| 4 | Fatemeh Keshavarz (IRI) | A | 75 | ~~80~~ | 80 | 5 | 95 | ~~104~~ | ~~104~~ | 4 | 175 |
| 5 | Al-Anoud Al-Shehri (KSA) | A | ~~60~~ | 60 | 63 | 6 | 72 | 75 | 78 | 5 | 141 |
| 6 | Shabra Mutesi (UGA) | A | ~~50~~ | 50 | 55 | 7 | 60 | 66 | ~~72~~ | 6 | 121 |
| — | Cansel Özkan (TUR) | A | 85 | ~~88~~ | 88 | 3rd place, bronze medalist(s) | ~~103~~ | ~~103~~ | ~~104~~ | — | NM |

=== 64 kg ===
13 August

| Rank | Athlete | Group | Snatch (kg) | | | | Clean & Jerk (kg) | | | | Total |
| Rank | Athlete | Group | 1 | 2 | 3 | Rank | 1 | 2 | 3 | Rank | Total |
|---|---|---|---|---|---|---|---|---|---|---|---|
| 1st place, gold medalist(s) | Nuray Güngör (TUR) | A | 95 | 97 | ~~99~~ | 2nd place, silver medalist(s) | 115 | 118 | 121 | 1st place, gold medalist(s) | 218 |
| 2nd place, silver medalist(s) | Tsabitha Alfiah Ramadani (INA) | A | 92 | 96 | 98 | 1st place, gold medalist(s) | 110 | 116 | ~~119~~ | 3rd place, bronze medalist(s) | 214 |
| 3rd place, bronze medalist(s) | Berfin Altun (TUR) | A | 75 | 80 | 84 | 4 | 107 | 113 | 118 | 2nd place, silver medalist(s) | 202 |
| 4 | Alexa Mina Colwell (LBN) | A | 77 | 82 | 85 | 3rd place, bronze medalist(s) | 96 | 101 | ~~105~~ | 4 | 186 |
| 5 | Shina Amani (IRI) | A | ~~75~~ | 75 | 81 | 5 | 95 | ~~100~~ | ~~100~~ | 5 | 176 |
| 6 | Forough Younesi (IRI) | A | 76 | ~~81~~ | ~~83~~ | 6 | 95 | ~~100~~ | ~~102~~ | 6 | 171 |
| 7 | Alia Al-Bastaki (UAE) | A | 45 | 48 | 53 | 8 | 58 | ~~62~~ | ~~62~~ | 7 | 111 |
| — | Zainab Yahya (BRN) | A | ~~71~~ | 72 | ~~73~~ | 7 | ~~90~~ | ~~90~~ | ~~90~~ | — | NM |

=== 71 kg ===
14 August

| Rank | Athlete | Group | Snatch (kg) | | | | Clean & Jerk (kg) | | | | Total |
| Rank | Athlete | Group | 1 | 2 | 3 | Rank | 1 | 2 | 3 | Rank | Total |
|---|---|---|---|---|---|---|---|---|---|---|---|
| 1st place, gold medalist(s) | Gülnabat Kadyrowa (TKM) | A | 100 | 104 | 107 | 1st place, gold medalist(s) | ~~118~~ | 118 | ~~123~~ | 3rd place, bronze medalist(s) | 225 |
| 2nd place, silver medalist(s) | Aysel Özkan (TUR) | A | 95 | ~~98~~ | ~~100~~ | 2nd place, silver medalist(s) | 115 | 119 | 121 | 1st place, gold medalist(s) | 216 |
| 3rd place, bronze medalist(s) | Restu Anggi (INA) | A | ~~88~~ | 88 | 90 | 3rd place, bronze medalist(s) | 115 | 120 | ~~122~~ | 2nd place, silver medalist(s) | 210 |
| 4 | Elaheh Razzaghi (IRI) | A | 85 | ~~89~~ | ~~89~~ | 4 | 105 | ~~110~~ | ~~110~~ | 4 | 190 |
| 5 | Elnura Abbasova (AZE) | A | 70 | 75 | 80 | 5 | 101 | ~~106~~ | ~~106~~ | 5 | 181 |
| 6 | Mai Al-Madani (UAE) | A | 63 | ~~64~~ | — | 6 | 75 | — | — | 6 | 138 |

=== 76 kg ===
14 August

| Rank | Athlete | Group | Snatch (kg) | | | | Clean & Jerk (kg) | | | | Total |
| Rank | Athlete | Group | 1 | 2 | 3 | Rank | 1 | 2 | 3 | Rank | Total |
|---|---|---|---|---|---|---|---|---|---|---|---|
| 1st place, gold medalist(s) | Dilara Uçan (TUR) | A | 94 | 97 | 99 | 1st place, gold medalist(s) | 117 | 121 | ~~123~~ | 3rd place, bronze medalist(s) | 220 |
| 2nd place, silver medalist(s) | Aray Nurlybekova (KAZ) | A | 90 | 94 | ~~97~~ | 2nd place, silver medalist(s) | 115 | 121 | ~~127~~ | 2nd place, silver medalist(s) | 215 |
| 3rd place, bronze medalist(s) | Jeanne Eyenga (CMR) | A | ~~90~~ | ~~90~~ | 90 | 5 | 115 | 120 | 124 | 1st place, gold medalist(s) | 214 |
| 4 | Nigora Suvonova (UZB) | A | 89 | ~~92~~ | 93 | 3rd place, bronze medalist(s) | 112 | ~~117~~ | ~~117~~ | 4 | 205 |
| 5 | Abrisham Arjomandkhah (IRI) | A | 85 | 91 | ~~93~~ | 4 | 111 | ~~116~~ | ~~117~~ | 5 | 202 |
| 6 | Anastassiya Moum (AZE) | A | 83 | ~~88~~ | 88 | 6 | 105 | 111 | ~~113~~ | 6 | 199 |
| 7 | Hoida Suliman (SUD) | A | 40 | 41 | 42 | 7 | 45 | 50 | 55 | 7 | 97 |

=== 81 kg ===
14 August

| Rank | Athlete | Group | Snatch (kg) | | | | Clean & Jerk (kg) | | | | Total |
| Rank | Athlete | Group | 1 | 2 | 3 | Rank | 1 | 2 | 3 | Rank | Total |
|---|---|---|---|---|---|---|---|---|---|---|---|
| 1st place, gold medalist(s) | Dilara Narin (TUR) | A | 96 | 99 | ~~102~~ | 2nd place, silver medalist(s) | 127 | 130 | — | 1st place, gold medalist(s) | 229 |
| 2nd place, silver medalist(s) | Aisha Omarova (KAZ) | A | ~~95~~ | 95 | 98 | 4 | 118 | 123 | 128 | 2nd place, silver medalist(s) | 226 |
| 3rd place, bronze medalist(s) | Elham Hosseini (IRI) | A | 95 | 100 | ~~103~~ | 1st place, gold medalist(s) | 117 | 123 | ~~127~~ | 3rd place, bronze medalist(s) | 223 |
| 4 | Rigina Adashbaeva (UZB) | A | 94 | 97 | 99 | 3rd place, bronze medalist(s) | 114 | ~~118~~ | 121 | 4 | 220 |
| 5 | Aiym Yeszhanova (KAZ) | A | 90 | ~~94~~ | ~~94~~ | 5 | 115 | ~~120~~ | ~~120~~ | 5 | 205 |
| 6 | Hanan Baqass (YEM) | A | 60 | ~~65~~ | ~~68~~ | 6 | 78 | 83 | ~~87~~ | 6 | 143 |

=== 87 kg ===
15 August

| Rank | Athlete | Group | Snatch (kg) | | | | Clean & Jerk (kg) | | | | Total |
| Rank | Athlete | Group | 1 | 2 | 3 | Rank | 1 | 2 | 3 | Rank | Total |
|---|---|---|---|---|---|---|---|---|---|---|---|
| 1st place, gold medalist(s) | Tursunoy Jabborova (UZB) | A | 102 | 106 | 109 | 1st place, gold medalist(s) | 122 | 126 | ~~130~~ | 1st place, gold medalist(s) | 235 |
| 2nd place, silver medalist(s) | Clémentine Meukeugni (CMR) | A | 90 | 100 | 101 | 2nd place, silver medalist(s) | 110 | — | — | 2nd place, silver medalist(s) | 211 |
| 3rd place, bronze medalist(s) | Kanymzhan Almazbek Kyzy (KGZ) | A | 65 | 70 | 76 | 3rd place, bronze medalist(s) | 85 | 90 | 95 | 3rd place, bronze medalist(s) | 171 |
| 4 | Zikryat Khojali (SUD) | A | 40 | 45 | ~~47~~ | 4 | 45 | 50 | 55 | 4 | 100 |

=== +87 kg ===
15 August

| Rank | Athlete | Group | Snatch (kg) | | | | Clean & Jerk (kg) | | | | Total |
| Rank | Athlete | Group | 1 | 2 | 3 | Rank | 1 | 2 | 3 | Rank | Total |
|---|---|---|---|---|---|---|---|---|---|---|---|
| 1st place, gold medalist(s) | Aizada Muptilda (KAZ) | A | 112 | 116 | ~~119~~ | 1st place, gold medalist(s) | 146 | 150 | — | 1st place, gold medalist(s) | 266 |
| 2nd place, silver medalist(s) | Lyubov Kovalchuk (KAZ) | A | 108 | 112 | 114 | 2nd place, silver medalist(s) | 138 | ~~145~~ | 147 | 2nd place, silver medalist(s) | 261 |
| 3rd place, bronze medalist(s) | Nurul Akmal (INA) | A | 105 | 110 | 113 | 3rd place, bronze medalist(s) | 142 | ~~148~~ | ~~148~~ | 3rd place, bronze medalist(s) | 255 |
| 4 | Melike Günal (TUR) | A | 105 | 109 | ~~111~~ | 4 | 125 | ~~130~~ | 130 | 4 | 239 |
| 5 | Fatemeh Yousefi (IRI) | A | 89 | 94 | ~~97~~ | 5 | 120 | 127 | ~~130~~ | 5 | 221 |
| 6 | Sangiza Bahtyýarowa (TKM) | A | 80 | ~~84~~ | 85 | 6 | 103 | 106 | 110 | 6 | 195 |
| 7 | Estelle Momeni (CMR) | A | ~~78~~ | 78 | 81 | 7 | 95 | ~~100~~ | ~~100~~ | 7 | 176 |
| 8 | Sohayba Rahman Rafa (BAN) | A | 62 | 64 | ~~66~~ | 8 | 78 | 81 | 84 | 8 | 148 |
