= Chaima Rahmouni =

Tunisian weightlifter (born 2001)

Personal information
- Born: 25 March 2001 (age 25)

Sport
- Country: Tunisia
- Sport: Weightlifting
- Weight class: 59 kg; 64 kg
Medal record
Women's weightlifting
Representing Tunisia
African Games
Silver medal – second place	2023 Accra	64 kg
Bronze medal – third place	2019 Rabat	59 kg
African Championships
Gold medal – first place	2022 Cairo	64 kg
Gold medal – first place	2026 Ismailia	63 kg
Bronze medal – third place	2019 Cairo	64 kg
Junior World Championships
Bronze medal – third place	2019 Suva	59 kg

Chaima Rahmouni (born 25 March 2001) is a Tunisian weightlifter. She is a two-time medalist at the African Games. She won the gold medal in the women's 64 kg event at the 2022 African Weightlifting Championships held in Cairo, Egypt.

== Career ==
She represented Tunisia at the 2019 African Games held in Rabat, Morocco and she won the bronze medal in the women's 59 kg event.

In 2020, she won the bronze medal in the women's 59 kg Clean & Jerk event at the Roma 2020 World Cup in Rome, Italy.

She represented Tunisia at the 2020 Summer Olympics in Tokyo, Japan. She competed in the women's 64 kg event.

She won the silver medal in the women's 64 kg event at the 2023 African Games held in Accra, Ghana.

== Achievements ==
Year	Venue	Weight	Snatch (kg)				Clean & Jerk (kg)				Total	Rank
Year	Venue	Weight	1	2	3	Rank	1	2	3	Rank	Total	Rank
Summer Olympics
2021	Tokyo, Japan	64 kg	88	91	~~93~~	—N/a	~~110~~	~~110~~	~~111~~	—N/a	—	—
African Games
2019	Rabat, Morocco	59 kg	83	87	~~89~~	3rd place, bronze medalist(s)	102	108	~~112~~	3rd place, bronze medalist(s)	195	3rd place, bronze medalist(s)
