= Jeanne Eyenga =

Cameroonian weightlifter (born 1999)

Personal information
- Born: 24 January 1999 (age 27) Yaoundé, Cameroon

Sport
- Country: Cameroon
- Sport: Weightlifting
- Weight class: 76 kg; 81 kg
Medal record
Women's weightlifting
Representing Cameroon
African Games
| Silver medal – second place | 2019 Rabat | 76 kg |
| Silver medal – second place | 2023 Accra | 81 kg |
Islamic Solidarity Games
| Bronze medal – third place | 2021 Konya | 76 kg |
African Championships
| Gold medal – first place | 2021 Nairobi | 76 kg |
| Bronze medal – third place | 2022 Cairo | 81 kg |

Jeanne Gaëlle Eyenga Mbo'ossi (born 24 January 1999 in Yaoundé) is a Cameroonian weightlifter. She represented Cameroon at the 2019 African Games held in Rabat, Morocco and she won the silver medal in the women's 76 kg event. She won the gold medal in her event at the 2021 African Weightlifting Championships held in Nairobi, Kenya.

She represented Cameroon at the 2020 Summer Olympics in Tokyo, Japan. She finished in 11th place in the women's 76 kg event.

She competed in the women's 76 kg event at the 2022 Commonwealth Games held in Birmingham, England.

She won the silver medal in the women's 81 kg event at the 2023 African Games held in Accra, Ghana.
