= Michel Ngongang =

Cameroonian weightlifter

Personal information
- Full name: Guy Michel Ngongang Tchuissi
- Born: 18 February 1995 (age 31)
- Weight: 76.01 kg (167.6 lb)

Sport
- Country: Cameroon
- Sport: Weightlifting
- Weight class: 77 kg
- Team: National team
- Updated on 19 October 2016

Guy Michel Ngongang Tchuissi (born 18 February 1995) is a Cameroonian male weightlifter, competing in the 77 kg category and representing Cameroon at international competitions. He participated at the 2014 Commonwealth Games in the 77 kg event.

== Major competitions ==
Year	Venue	Weight	Snatch (kg)				Clean & Jerk (kg)				Total	Rank
Year	Venue	Weight	1	2	3	Rank	1	2	3	Rank	Total	Rank
Commonwealth Games
2014	Glasgow, Scotland	77 kg	-132	~~132~~	132	—N/a	~~167~~	167	~~171~~	—N/a	299	7
