= Nouha Landoulsi =

Tunisian weightlifter (born 1998)

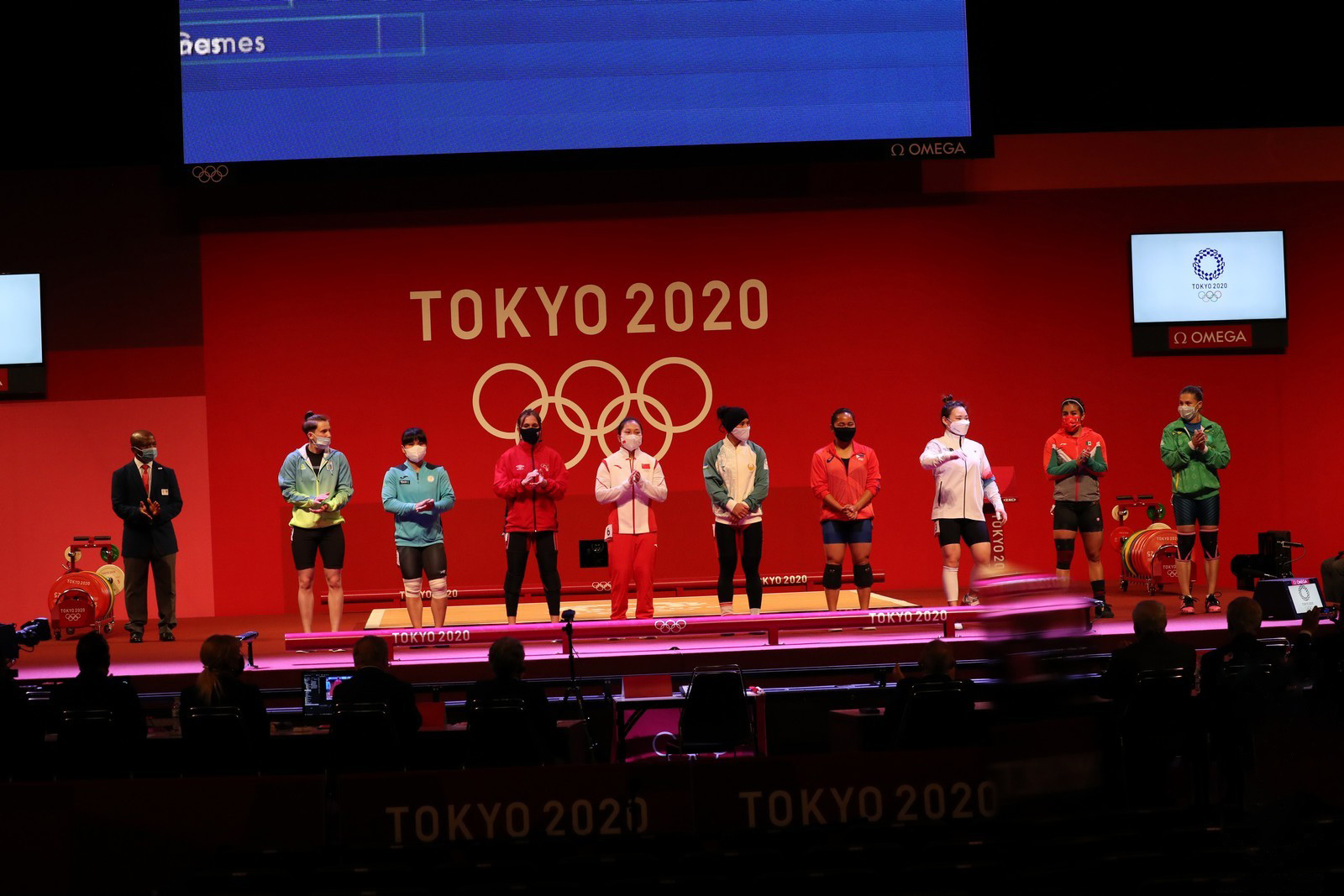
- Landoulsi (3rd from left) among the athletes' introduction at the women's 55kg event in Tokyo.

Personal information
- Born: 5 May 1998 (age 28)
- Weight: 52.24 kg (115.2 lb)

Sport
- Country: Tunisia
- Sport: Weightlifting
- Weight class: 53 kg
- Team: National team
- Updated on 9 November 2016

Nouha Landoulsi (born 5 May 1998) is a Tunisian weightlifter, competing in the 53 kg category and represented Tunisia at international competitions.

== Career ==
She won the bronze medal at the 2014 Summer Youth Olympics. She was first at the 2016 African Weightlifting Championships.

In 2018, she won the silver medal in the women's 58 kg event at the Junior World Weightlifting Championships held in Tashkent, Uzbekistan. In 2019, she competed in the women's 55 kg event at the 2019 World Weightlifting Championships held in Pattaya, Thailand.

In 2020, she won the bronze medal in the women's 55 kg event at the Roma 2020 World Cup in Rome, Italy.

She represented Tunisia at the 2020 Summer Olympics in Tokyo, Japan. She competed in the women's 55 kg event.

== Major results ==
Year	Venue	Weight	Snatch (kg)				Clean & Jerk (kg)				Total	Rank
Year	Venue	Weight	1	2	3	Rank	1	2	3	Rank	Total	Rank
Summer Youth Olympics
2014	Nanjing, China	53 kg	75	~~78~~	79	---	~~96~~	96	~~99~~	---	175	3rd place, bronze medalist(s)
