= Junior Ngadja Nyabeyeu =

Cameroonian weightlifter (born 1993)

Personal information
- Full name: Junior Périclex Ngadja Nyabeyeu
- Born: 16 June 1993 (age 33)
Medal record
Men's Weightlifting
Representing Cameroon
Commonwealth Games
Gold medal – first place	2022 Birmingham	109 kg

Junior Périclex Ngadja Nyabeyeu (born 16 June 1993) is a Cameroonian weightlifter, who competes in the 109 kg category and represents Cameroon at international competitions. In August 2022, he won gold at the 2022 Commonwealth Games.
