= Weightlifting at the 2023 Arab Games =

- Venue: Bordj El Kiffan Multisports Hall
- Location: Bordj El Kiffan, Algiers, Algeria
- Dates: 11–14 July

At the 2023 Arab Games, the weightlifting events were held at Bordj El Kiffan Multisports Hall in Bordj El Kiffan, Algiers, Algeria from 11 to 14 July. A total of 20 events were contested. Egypt was ranked first in the medal table.

== Medal table ==
* Host nation (Algeria)

2023 Weightlifting Arab Games
Rank	NOC	Gold	Silver	Bronze	Total
1	Egypt (EGY)	7	1	0	8
2	Algeria (ALG)*	3	6	3	12
3	Saudi Arabia (KSA)	2	2	2	6
4	Morocco (MAR)	2	1	2	5
5	Libya (LBA)	2	0	0	2
5	Syria (SYR)	2	0	0	2
7	Iraq (IRQ)	1	6	3	10
8	Oman (OMA)	1	0	1	2
9	Tunisia (TUN)	0	4	7	11
10	Jordan (JOR)	0	0	2	2
Totals (10 entries)		20	20	20	60

=== Men ===
Event	Gold		Silver		Bronze	
61 KG Snatch	Seraj Abdulrahman M Alsaleem (KSA)	120	Amine Bouhijbha (TUN)	115	Mohammed Ahmed Abd Ali Albacha Chee (IRQ)	111
61 KG Clean Jerk	Seraj Abdulrahman M Alsaleem (KSA)	150	Mohammed Ahmed Abd Ali Albacha Chee (IRQ)	148	Amine Bouhijbha (TUN)	146
73 KG Snatch	Ahsaan Shabi (LBA)	139	Mahmoud Mohammed S Al Humayd (KSA)	135	Abdulrahman Saleh T Albeladi (KSA)	131
73 KG Clean Jerk	Ahsaan Shabi (LBA)	174	Mahmoud Mohammed S Al Humayd (KSA)	173	Samir Fardjallah (ALG)	172
89 KG Snatch	Faris Touairi (ALG)	164	Safaa Rashid Mahmoud Aljumaili (IRQ)	162	Amur Salim Ramadhan Al-Khanjari (OMA)	150
89 KG Clean Jerk	Amur Salim Ramadhan Al-Khanjari (OMA)	203	Safaa Rashid Mahmoud Aljumaili (IRQ)	202	Faris Touairi (ALG)	171
102 KG Snatch	Qasim Hasan Abdulhussein Allami (IRQ)	172	Aymen Touairi (ALG)	167	Asem Mousa Husam Alsallaj (JOR)	145
102 KG Clean Jerk	AymenTouairi (ALG)	193	Qasim Hasan Abdulhussein Allami (IRQ)	192	Asem Mousa Husam Alsallaj (JOR)	177
More 102 KG Snatch	Man Asaad (SYR)	175	Salim Elbagor (ALG)	150	Ezzedine Maik Lahmadi (TUN)	130
More 102 KG Clean Jerk	Man Asaad (SYR)	225	Salim Elbagor (ALG)	170	Ezzedine Maik Lahmadi (TUN)	160

=== Women ===
Event	Gold		Silver		Bronze	
49 KG Snatch	Maha Fejreslam (MAR)	65	Amal Moussa (EGY)	64	Nadia Katbi (ALG)	57
49 KG Clean Jerk	Amal Moussa (EGY)	81	Maha Fajreslam (MAR)	80	Nour Khalfaoui (TUN)	78
59 KG Snatch	Ech-Chaibia Ech-Chachouiy (MAR)	78	Fatima Zohra Laghouati (ALG)	77	Souhir Khmiri (TUN)	75
59 KG Clean Jerk	Fatima Zohra Laghouati (ALG)	98	Souhir Khmiri (TUN)	97	Manasik Alaa Ahmed Almalahma (IRQ)	82
71 KG Snatch	Neama Said (EGY)	105	Chaima Rahmouni (TUN)	90	Jawaher Gesmi (TUN)	80
71 KG Clean Jerk	Neama Said (EGY)	130	Chaima Rahmouni (TUN)	110	Jawaher Gesmi (TUN)	108
81 KG Snatch	Rahma Elsayed (EGY)	92	Hadeel Salim Neamah Alsaedi (IRQ)	85	Rkia Sabihi (MAR)	84
81 KG Clean Jerk	Rahma Elsayed (EGY)	115	Hadeel Salim Neamah Alsaedi (IRQ)	108	Rkia Sabihi (MAR)	108
More 81 KG Snatch	Shimaa Ali (EGY)	85	Amina Yahia Mamoun (ALG)	82	Nujud Hussain Y Khormi (KSA)	59
More 81 KG Clean Jerk	Simaa Ali (EGY)	107	Amina Yahia Mamoun (ALG)	106	Rayan Luqman Abdulqader (IRQ)	85

== Participating nations ==
- Algeria (10)
- Palestine (1)
- Iraq (7)
- Saudi Arabia (9)
- Tunisia (10)
- Jordan (3)
- Libya (1)
- Oman (2)
- Bahrain (2)
- United Arab Emirates (3)
- Sudan (1)
- Syria (1)
- Egypt (5)
- Morocco (3)
