= Bordj El Kiffan =

Bordj El Kifan برج الكيفان
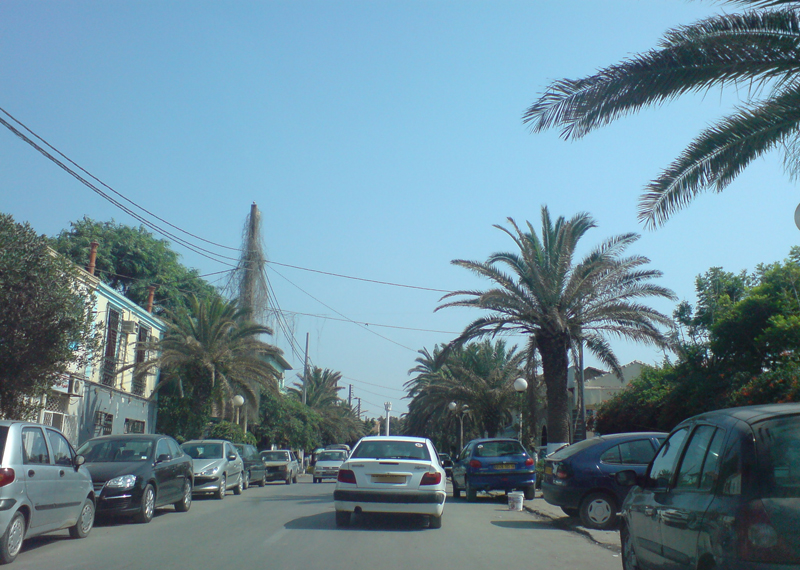

- Location within Algeria
- Coordinates: 36°44′15″N 3°11′35″E
- Country: Algeria
- Province: Algiers

Area
  - Total: 21.69 km^{2} (8.37 sq mi)
- Elevation: 32 m (105 ft)

Population (2008)
  - Total: 151,950
  - Density: 7,006/km^{2} (18,140/sq mi)
- Time zone: UTC+1 (CET)
- Postal code: 16031

Bordj El Kiffan (Arabic 'برج الكيفان') is a suburb of the city of Algiers in northern Algeria. It is in the eastern section of the city, near Matares Beach. Named Fort de l'Eau (Fr. 'Water Fortress') under French rule prior to 1962, used to be a famous beach resort within the Bay of Algiers. Due to pollution, the beach is not used any more for swimming.

It is situated directly north (i.e. towards the Mediterranean sea) of the close by Algiers' Houari Boumedienne international airport, with direct highway connection from the capital.
