= List of North Korean records in Olympic weightlifting =

The following are the records of North Korea in Olympic weightlifting. Records are maintained in each weight class for the snatch lift, clean and jerk lift, and the total for both lifts by the Weightlifting Association of the Democratic People's Republic of Korea.

== Current records ==
=== Men ===
Event	Record	Athlete	Date	Meet	Place	Ref
60 kg
Snatch	130 kg	Pang Un-chol	11 May 2026	Asian Championships	Gandhinagar, India	
Clean & Jerk	174 kg	Pang Un-chol	11 May 2026	Asian Championships	Gandhinagar, India	
Total	304 kg	Pang Un-chol	11 May 2026	Asian Championships	Gandhinagar, India	
65 kg
Snatch	146 kg	Pak Myong-jin	24 September 2026	Asian Games	Nagoya, Japan	
Clean & Jerk	187 kg	Pak Myong-jin	28 October 2026	World Championships	Ningbo, China	
Total	331 kg	Pak Myong-jin	28 October 2026	World Championships	Ningbo, China	
70 kg
Snatch	157 kg	Pak Pyol	30 October 2026	World Championships	Ningbo, China	
Clean & Jerk	198 kg	Ri Won-ju	26 September 2026	Asian Games	Nagoya, Japan	
Total	355 kg	Pak Pyol	30 October 2026	World Championships	Ningbo, China	
75 kg
Snatch	162 kg	Ri Chong-song	26 September 2026	Asian Games	Nagoya, Japan	
Clean & Jerk	195 kg	Ri Chong-song	26 September 2026	Asian Games	Nagoya, Japan	
Total	357 kg	Ri Chong-song	26 September 2026	Asian Games	Nagoya, Japan	
85 kg
Snatch	165 kg	Ro Kwang-ryol	28 September 2026	Asian Games	Nagoya, Japan	
Clean & Jerk	215 kg	Ro Kwang-ryol	2 November 2026	World Championships	Ningbo, China	
Total	379 kg	Ro Kwang-ryol	28 September 2026	Asian Games	Nagoya, Japan	
94 kg
Snatch						
Clean & Jerk						
Total						
110 kg
Snatch						
Clean & Jerk						
Total						
+110 kg
Snatch						
Clean & Jerk						
Total						

=== Women ===
Event	Record	Athlete	Date	Meet	Place	Ref
48 kg
Snatch	91 kg	Ri Song-gum	2 October 2025	World Championships	Førde, Norway	
Clean & Jerk	122 kg	Ri Song-gum	2 October 2025	World Championships	Førde, Norway	
Total	213 kg	Ri Song-gum	2 October 2025	World Championships	Førde, Norway	
53 kg
Snatch						
Clean & Jerk						
Total						
58 kg
Snatch	105 kg	Kim Il-gyong	13 May 2026	Asian Championships	Gandhinagar, India	
Clean & Jerk	132 kg	Kim Il-gyong	4 October 2025	World Championships	Førde, Norway	
Total	236 kg	Kim Il-gyong	4 October 2025	World Championships	Førde, Norway	
63 kg
Snatch	111 kg	Ri Suk	5 October 2025	World Championships	Førde, Norway	
Clean & Jerk	143 kg	Ri Suk	14 May 2026	Asian Championships	Gandhinagar, India	
Total	254 kg	Ri Suk	14 May 2026	Asian Championships	Gandhinagar, India	
69 kg
Snatch	122 kg	Song Kuk-hyang	3 November 2026	World Championships	Ningbo, China	
Clean & Jerk	153 kg	Song Kuk-hyang	3 November 2026	World Championships	Ningbo, China	
Total	275 kg	Song Kuk-hyang	3 November 2026	World Championships	Ningbo, China	
77 kg
Snatch						
Clean & Jerk						
Total						
86 kg
Snatch						
Clean & Jerk						
Total						
+86 kg
Snatch						
Clean & Jerk						
Total						

== Historical records ==
=== Men (2018–2025) ===
Event	Record	Athlete	Date	Meet	Place	Ref
55 kg
Snatch	128 kg	Om Yun-chol	18 September 2019	World Championships	Pattaya, Thailand	
Clean & Jerk	166 kg	Om Yun-chol	18 September 2019	World Championships	Pattaya, Thailand	
Total	294 kg	Om Yun-chol	18 September 2019	World Championships	Pattaya, Thailand	
61 kg
Snatch	136 kg	Pak Myong-jin	1 October 2023	Asian Games	Hangzhou, China	
Clean & Jerk	171 kg	Pak Myong-jin	1 October 2023	Asian Games	Hangzhou, China	
Total	307 kg	Pak Myong-jin	1 October 2023	Asian Games	Hangzhou, China	
67 kg
Snatch	150 kg	Pak Pyol	8 December 2024	World Championships	Manama, Bahrain	
Clean & Jerk	190 kg	Ri Won-ju	8 December 2024	World Championships	Manama, Bahrain	
Total	336 kg	Ri Won-ju	8 December 2024	World Championships	Manama, Bahrain	
73 kg
Snatch	155 kg	Ri Chong-song	4 November 2018	World Championships	Ashgabat, Turkmenistan	
Clean & Jerk	193 kg	O Kang-chol	21 September 2019	World Championships	Pattaya, Thailand	
Total	347 kg	O Kang-chol	21 September 2019	World Championships	Pattaya, Thailand	
81 kg
Snatch	169 kg	Ri Chong-song	4 October 2023	Asian Games	Hangzhou, China	
Clean & Jerk	209 kg	Ri Chong-song	9 December 2023	IWF Grand Prix II	Doha, Qatar	
Total	374 kg	Ri Chong-song	9 December 2023	IWF Grand Prix II	Doha, Qatar	
89 kg
Snatch	168 kg	Ro Kwang-ryol	10 December 2023	IWF Grand Prix II	Doha, Qatar	
Clean & Jerk	211 kg	Ro Kwang-ryol	10 December 2023	IWF Grand Prix II	Doha, Qatar	
Total	379 kg	Ro Kwang-ryol	10 December 2023	IWF Grand Prix II	Doha, Qatar	
96 kg
Snatch	170 kg	Ro Kwang-ryol	5 October 2023	Asian Games	Hangzhou, China	
Clean & Jerk	219 kg	Won Jong-beom	7 April 2024	World Cup	Phuket, Thailand	
Total	389 kg	Won Jong-beom	7 April 2024	World Cup	Phuket, Thailand	
102 kg
Snatch						
Clean & Jerk						
Total						
109 kg
Snatch						
Clean & Jerk						
Total						
+109 kg
Snatch	157 kg	Cha Kang-jin	27 October 2019	Asian Youth & Junior Championships	Pyongyang, North Korea	
Clean & Jerk						
Total						

=== Women (2018–2025) ===
Event	Record	Athlete	Date	Meet	Place	Ref,
45 kg
Snatch	87 kg	Won Hyon-sim	31 March 2024	World Cup	Phuket, Thailand	
Clean & Jerk	109 kg	Won Hyon-sim	31 March 2024	World Cup	Phuket, Thailand	
Total	196 kg	Won Hyon-sim	31 March 2024	World Cup	Phuket, Thailand	
49 kg
Snatch	97 kg	Ri Song-gum	1 April 2024	World Cup	Phuket, Thailand	
Clean & Jerk	125 kg	Ri Song-gum	4 February 2024	Asian Championships	Tashkent, Uzbekistan	
Total	221 kg	Ri Song-gum	1 April 2024	World Cup	Phuket, Thailand	
55 kg
Snatch	104 kg	Kang Hyon-gyong	4 February 2024	Asian Championships	Tashkent, Uzbekistan	
Clean & Jerk	131 kg	Kang Hyon-gyong	2 April 2024	World Cup	Phuket, Thailand	
Total	234 kg	Kang Hyon-gyong	2 April 2024	World Cup	Phuket, Thailand	
59 kg
Snatch	111 kg	Kim Il-gyong	2 October 2023	Asian Games	Hangzhou, China	
Clean & Jerk	141 kg	Kim Il-gyong	9 December 2024	World Championships	Manama, Bahrain	
Total	249 kg	Kim Il-gyong	9 December 2024	World Championships	Manama, Bahrain	
64 kg
Snatch	116 kg	Rim Un-sim	10 December 2024	World Championships	Manama, Bahrain	
Clean & Jerk	149 kg	Ri Suk	10 December 2024	World Championships	Manama, Bahrain	
Total	264 kg	Ri Suk	10 December 2024	World Championships	Manama, Bahrain	
71 kg
Snatch	121 kg	Song Kuk-hyang	13 May 2025	Asian Championships	Jiangshan, China	
Clean & Jerk	155 kg	Song Kuk-hyang	13 May 2025	Asian Championships	Jiangshan, China	
Total	276 kg	Song Kuk-hyang	13 May 2025	Asian Championships	Jiangshan, China	
76 kg
Snatch	124 kg	Rim Jong-sim	24 September 2019	World Championships	Pattaya, Thailand	
Clean & Jerk	155 kg	Rim Jong-sim	26 April 2019	Asian Championships	Ningbo, China	
Total	278 kg	Rim Jong-sim	26 April 2019	Asian Championships	Ningbo, China	
81 kg
Snatch	106 kg	Kim Un-song	24 October 2019	Asian Youth & Junior Championships	Pyongyang, North Korea	
Clean & Jerk	131 kg	Kim Un-song	24 October 2019	Asian Youth & Junior Championships	Pyongyang, North Korea	
Total	237 kg	Kim Un-song	24 October 2019	Asian Youth & Junior Championships	Pyongyang, North Korea	
87 kg
Snatch	115 kg	Kim Un-ju	26 September 2019	World Championships	Pattaya, Thailand	
Clean & Jerk	154 kg	Kim Un-ju	27 February 2019	World Cup	Fuzhou, China	
Total	269 kg	Kim Un-ju	26 September 2019	World Championships	Pattaya, Thailand	
+87 kg
Snatch	130 kg	Kim Kuk-hyang	10 November 2018	World Championships	Ashgabat, Turkmenistan	
Clean & Jerk	173 kg	Kim Kuk-hyang	27 September 2019	World Championships	Pattaya, Thailand	
Total	303 kg	Kim Kuk-hyang	27 September 2019	World Championships	Pattaya, Thailand	

== Historical records ==
=== Men (1998–2018) ===
Event	Record	Athlete	Date	Meet	Place	Ref
56 kg
Snatch	134 kg	Om Yun-chol	7 August 2016	Olympic Games	Rio de Janeiro, Brazil	
Clean & Jerk	171 kg	Om Yun-chol	21 November 2015	World Championships	Houston, United States	
Total	303 kg	Om Yun-chol	7 August 2016	Olympic Games	Rio de Janeiro, Brazil	
62 kg
Snatch	154 kg	Kim Un-guk	21 September 2014	Asian Games	Incheon, South Korea	
Clean & Jerk	178 kg	Kim Un-guk	21 September 2014	Asian Games	Incheon, South Korea	
Total	332 kg	Kim Un-guk	21 September 2014	Asian Games	Incheon, South Korea	
69 kg
Snatch	160 kg	Kim Myong-hyok	22 September 2014	Asian Games	Incheon, South Korea	
Clean & Jerk	187 kg	Kim Myong-hyok	23 November 2015	World Championships	Houston, United States	
Total	342 kg	Kim Myong-hyok	22 September 2014	Asian Games	Incheon, South Korea	
77 kg
Snatch	168 kg	Kim Kwang-song	23 September 2014	Asian Games	Incheon, South Korea	
Clean & Jerk	200 kg	Kim Kwang-song	12 November 2014	World Championships	Almaty, Kazakhstan	
Total	363 kg	Kim Kwang-song	23 September 2014	Asian Games	Incheon, South Korea	
85 kg
Snatch	158 kg	Jon Myong-song	24 August 2018	Asian Games	Jakarta, Indonesia	
Clean & Jerk	190 kg	Jon Myong-song	24 August 2018	Asian Games	Jakarta, Indonesia	
Total	348 kg	Jon Myong-song	24 August 2018	Asian Games	Jakarta, Indonesia	
94 kg
Snatch						
Clean & Jerk						
Total						
105 kg
Snatch						
Clean & Jerk						
Total						
+105 kg
Snatch	122 kg	Ri Jae-gyong	11 December 2009	East Asian Games	Hong Kong, China	
Clean & Jerk	165 kg	Ri Jae-gyong	11 December 2009	East Asian Games	Hong Kong, China	
Total	287 kg	Ri Jae-gyong	11 December 2009	East Asian Games	Hong Kong, China	

=== Women (1998–2018) ===
Event	Record	Athlete	Date	Meet	Place	Ref
48 kg
Snatch	87 kg	Ri Song-gum	20 August 2018	Asian Games	Jakarta, Indonesia	
Clean & Jerk	112 kg	Ryang Chun-hwa	28 July 2012	Olympic Games	London, United Kingdom	
Total	199 kg	Ri Song-gum	20 August 2018	Asian Games	Jakarta, Indonesia	
53 kg
Snatch	97.5 kg	Ri Song-hui	20 November 2002	World Championships	Warsaw, Poland	
Clean & Jerk	127.5 kg	Ri Song-hui	20 November 2002	World Championships	Warsaw, Poland	
Total	225 kg	Ri Song-hui	20 November 2002	World Championships	Warsaw, Poland	
58 kg
Snatch	105 kg	Ri Jong-hwa	24 June 2013	Asian Championships	Astana, Kazakhstan	
Clean & Jerk	134 kg	Ri Jong-hwa	22 September 2014	Asian Games	Incheon, South Korea	
Total	237 kg	Ri Jong-hwa	15 September 2013	Asian Cup	Pyongyang, North Korea	
63 kg
Snatch	109 kg	Jo Pok-hyang	23 October 2013	World Championships	Wrocław, Poland	
Clean & Jerk	143 kg	Choe Hyo-sim	9 August 2016	Olympic Games	Rio de Janeiro, Brazil	
Total	249 kg	Jo Pok-hyang	23 October 2013	World Championships	Wrocław, Poland	
69 kg
Snatch	121 kg	Ryo Un-hui	24 September 2014	Asian Games	Incheon, South Korea	
Clean & Jerk	146 kg	Rim Jong-sim	1 August 2012	Olympic Games	London, United Kingdom	
Total	265 kg	Ryo Un-hui	14 November 2014	World Championships	Almaty, Kazakhstan	
75 kg
Snatch	128 kg	Kim Un-ju	25 September 2014	Asian Games	Incheon, South Korea	
Clean & Jerk	164 kg	Kim Un-ju	25 September 2014	Asian Games	Incheon, South Korea	
Total	292 kg	Kim Un-ju	25 September 2014	Asian Games	Incheon, South Korea	
90 kg
Snatch	117 kg	Kim Un-ju	17 September 2013	Asian Interclub Championships	Pyongyang, North Korea	
Clean & Jerk	152 kg	Kim Un-ju	17 September 2013	Asian Interclub Championships	Pyongyang, North Korea	
Total	269 kg	Kim Un-ju	17 September 2013	Asian Interclub Championships	Pyongyang, North Korea	
+90 kg
Snatch	132 kg	Kim Kuk-hyang	25 August 2017	Summer Universiade	New Taipei, Taiwan	
Clean & Jerk	175 kg	Kim Kuk-hyang	14 August 2016	Olympic Games	Rio de Janeiro, Brazil	
Total	306 kg	Kim Kuk-hyang	14 August 2016	Olympic Games	Rio de Janeiro, Brazil	
