= List of Asian Games records in Olympic weightlifting =

This is the list of Asian Games records in weightlifting. Records are maintained in each weight class for the snatch lift, clean and jerk lift, and the total for both lifts.

The weight classes on the Asian Games program were adjusted for the 1998 Games, so Asian Games records only exist based on the results during and after that.

== Current records ==
=== Men ===
Event	Record	Athlete	Nation	Games	Date	Ref
60 kg
Snatch	138 kg	Asian Games Standard	—	—	1 August 2026	
Clean & Jerk	174 kg	Pang Un-chol	North Korea	2026 Aichi–Nagoya	24 September 2026	
Total	304 kg	Yang Yang	China	2026 Aichi–Nagoya	24 September 2026	
65 kg
Snatch	152 kg	He Yueji	China	2026 Aichi–Nagoya	24 September 2026	
Clean & Jerk	182 kg	Pak Myong-jin	North Korea	2026 Aichi–Nagoya	24 September 2026	
Total	328 kg	Pak Myong-jin	North Korea	2026 Aichi–Nagoya	24 September 2026	
70 kg
Snatch	154 kg	Masanori Miyamoto	Japan	2026 Aichi–Nagoya	26 September 2026	
Clean & Jerk	198 kg	Ri Won-ju	North Korea	2026 Aichi–Nagoya	26 September 2026	
Total	349 kg	Ri Won-ju	North Korea	2026 Aichi–Nagoya	26 September 2026	
75 kg
Snatch	162 kg	Ri Chong-song	North Korea	2026 Aichi–Nagoya	26 September 2026	
Clean & Jerk	206 kg	Rahmat Erwin Abdullah	Indonesia	2026 Aichi–Nagoya	26 September 2026	
Total	366 kg	Rahmat Erwin Abdullah	Indonesia	2026 Aichi–Nagoya	26 September 2026	
85 kg
Snatch	173 kg	Alexey Churkin	Kazakhstan	2026 Aichi–Nagoya	28 September 2026	
Clean & Jerk	214 kg	Ro Kwang-ryol	North Korea	2026 Aichi–Nagoya	28 September 2026	
Total	379 kg	Ro Kwang-ryol	North Korea	2026 Aichi–Nagoya	28 September 2026	
95 kg
Snatch	180 kg	Ali Alipour	Iran	2026 Aichi–Nagoya	28 September 2026	
Clean & Jerk	218 kg	Ali Alipour	Iran	2026 Aichi–Nagoya	28 September 2026	
Total	398 kg	Ali Alipour	Iran	2026 Aichi–Nagoya	28 September 2026	
110 kg
Snatch	197 kg	Akbar Djuraev	Uzbekistan	2026 Aichi–Nagoya	29 September 2026	
Clean & Jerk	226 kg	Akbar Djuraev	Uzbekistan	2026 Aichi–Nagoya	29 September 2026	
Total	423 kg	Akbar Djuraev	Uzbekistan	2026 Aichi–Nagoya	29 September 2026	
+110 kg
Snatch	219 kg	Ali Ammar	Iraq	2026 Aichi–Nagoya	29 September 2026	
Clean & Jerk	260 kg	Ali Davoudi	Iran	2026 Aichi–Nagoya	29 September 2026	
Total	466 kg	Ali Davoudi	Iran	2026 Aichi–Nagoya	29 September 2026	

=== Women ===
Event	Record	Athlete	Nation	Games	Date	Ref
49 kg
Snatch	94 kg	Ri Song-gum	North Korea	2026 Aichi–Nagoya	23 September 2026	
Clean & Jerk	121 kg	Ri Song-gum	North Korea	2026 Aichi–Nagoya	23 September 2026	
Total	215 kg	Ri Song-gum	North Korea	2026 Aichi–Nagoya	23 September 2026	
53 kg
Snatch	99 kg	Kang Hyon-gyong	North Korea	2026 Aichi–Nagoya	23 September 2026	
Clean & Jerk	124 kg	Kang Hyon-gyong	North Korea	2026 Aichi–Nagoya	23 September 2026	
Total	223 kg	Kang Hyon-gyong	North Korea	2026 Aichi–Nagoya	23 September 2026	
57 kg
Snatch	104 kg	Oh Kwang-ok	North Korea	2026 Aichi–Nagoya	25 September 2026	
Clean & Jerk	134 kg	Oh Kwang-ok	North Korea	2026 Aichi–Nagoya	25 September 2026	
Total	238 kg	Oh Kwang-ok	North Korea	2026 Aichi–Nagoya	25 September 2026	
61 kg
Snatch	112 kg	Yang Liuyue	China	2026 Aichi–Nagoya	25 September 2026	
Clean & Jerk	139 kg	Pak Jin-hae	North Korea	2026 Aichi–Nagoya	25 September 2026	
Total	251 kg	Yang Liuyue	China	2026 Aichi–Nagoya	25 September 2026	
69 kg
Snatch	121 kg	Song Kuk-hyang	North Korea	2026 Aichi–Nagoya	27 September 2026	
Clean & Jerk	152 kg	Song Kuk-hyang	North Korea	2026 Aichi–Nagoya	27 September 2026	
Total	273 kg	Song Kuk-hyang	North Korea	2026 Aichi–Nagoya	27 September 2026	
77 kg
Snatch	120 kg	Asian Games Standard	—	—	1 August 2026	
Clean & Jerk	150 kg	Asian Games Standard	—	—	1 August 2026	
Total	268 kg	Asian Games Standard	—	—	1 August 2026	
86 kg
Snatch	125 kg	Asian Games Standard	—	—	1 August 2026	
Clean & Jerk	158 kg	Asian Games Standard	—	—	1 August 2026	
Total	281 kg	Asian Games Standard	—	—	1 August 2026	
+86 kg
Snatch	140 kg	Li Wenwen	China	2026 Aichi–Nagoya	29 September 2026	
Clean & Jerk	173 kg	Asian Games Standard	—	—	1 August 2026	
Total	310 kg	Li Wenwen	China	2026 Aichi–Nagoya	29 September 2026	

== Historical records ==
=== Men (2022) ===
Event	Record	Athlete	Nation	Games	Date	Ref
61 kg
Snatch	143 kg	Li Fabin	China	2022 Hangzhou	1 October 2023	
Clean & Jerk	172 kg	Asian Games Standard	—	—	1 November 2018	
Total	310 kg	Li Fabin	China	2022 Hangzhou	1 October 2023	
67 kg
Snatch	150 kg	Chen Lijun	China	2022 Hangzhou	1 October 2023	
Clean & Jerk	180 kg	Asian Games Standard	—	—	1 November 2018	
Total	330 kg	Chen Lijun	China	2022 Hangzhou	1 October 2023	
73 kg
Snatch	161 kg	Wei Yinting	China	2022 Hangzhou	3 October 2023	
Clean & Jerk	201 kg	Rahmat Erwin Abdullah	Indonesia	2022 Hangzhou	3 October 2023	
Total	359 kg	Rahmat Erwin Abdullah	Indonesia	2022 Hangzhou	3 October 2023	
81 kg
Snatch	169 kg	Ri Chong-song	North Korea	2022 Hangzhou	4 October 2023	
Clean & Jerk	199 kg	Asian Games Standard	—	—	1 November 2018	
Total	364 kg	Ri Chong-song	North Korea	2022 Hangzhou	4 October 2023	
96 kg
Snatch	180 kg	Asian Games Standard	—	—	1 November 2018	
Clean & Jerk	216 kg	Ro Kwang-ryol	North Korea	2022 Hangzhou	5 October 2023	
Total	390 kg	Asian Games Standard	—	—	1 November 2018	
109 kg
Snatch	190 kg	Asian Games Standard	—	—	1 November 2018	
Clean & Jerk	233 kg	Liu Huanhua	China	2022 Hangzhou	6 October 2023	
Total	418 kg	Liu Huanhua	China	2022 Hangzhou	6 October 2023	
+109 kg
Snatch	212 kg	Gor Minasyan	Bahrain	2022 Hangzhou	7 October 2023	
Clean & Jerk	245 kg	Gor Minasyan	Bahrain	2022 Hangzhou	7 October 2023	
Total	457 kg	Gor Minasyan	Bahrain	2022 Hangzhou	7 October 2023	

=== Men (1998–2018) ===
Event	Record	Athlete	Nation	Games	Date	Ref
56 kg
Snatch	134 kg	Thạch Kim Tuấn	Vietnam	2014 Incheon	20 September 2014	
Clean & Jerk	170 kg	Om Yun-chol	North Korea	2014 Incheon	20 September 2014	
Total	298 kg	Om Yun-chol	North Korea	2014 Incheon	20 September 2014	
62 kg
Snatch	154 kg	Kim Un-guk	North Korea	2014 Incheon	21 September 2014	
Clean & Jerk	182 kg	Le Maosheng	China	2002 Busan	2 October 2002	
Total	332 kg	Kim Un-guk	North Korea	2014 Incheon	21 September 2014	
69 kg
Snatch	160 kg	Kim Myong-hyok	North Korea	2014 Incheon	22 September 2014	
Clean & Jerk	195 kg	Kim Hak-bong	South Korea	1998 Bangkok	9 December 1998	
Total	345 kg	Zhang Guozheng	China	2002 Busan	3 October 2002	
77 kg
Snatch	175 kg	Lü Xiaojun	China	2014 Incheon	23 September 2014	
Clean & Jerk	202 kg	Mohammad Hossein Barkhah	Iran	2002 Busan	4 October 2002	
Total	375 kg	Sergey Filimonov	Kazakhstan	2002 Busan	4 October 2002	
85 kg
Snatch	175 kg	Vyacheslav Yershov	Kazakhstan	2006 Doha	5 December 2006	
Clean & Jerk	218 kg	Tian Tao	China	2014 Incheon	24 September 2014	
Total	381 kg	Tian Tao	China	2014 Incheon	24 September 2014	
94 kg
Snatch	189 kg	Sohrab Moradi	Iran	2018 Jakarta–Palembang	25 August 2018	
Clean & Jerk	226 kg	Ilya Ilyin	Kazakhstan	2006 Doha	5 December 2006	
Total	410 kg	Sohrab Moradi	Iran	2018 Jakarta–Palembang	25 August 2018	
105 kg
Snatch	195 kg	Cui Wenhua	China	1998 Bangkok	13 December 1998	
Clean & Jerk	230 kg	Ruslan Nurudinov	Uzbekistan	2018 Jakarta–Palembang	26 August 2018	
Total	421 kg	Ruslan Nurudinov	Uzbekistan	2018 Jakarta–Palembang	26 August 2018	
+105 kg
Snatch	210 kg	Behdad Salimi	Iran	2014 Incheon	26 September 2014	
Clean & Jerk	255 kg	Behdad Salimi	Iran	2014 Incheon	26 September 2014	
Total	465 kg	Behdad Salimi	Iran	2014 Incheon	26 September 2014	

=== Women (2022) ===
Event	Record	Athlete	Nation	Games	Date	Ref
49 kg
Snatch	94 kg	Jiang Huihua	China	2022 Hangzhou	30 September 2023	
Clean & Jerk	124 kg	Ri Song-gum	North Korea	2022 Hangzhou	30 September 2023	
Total	216 kg	Ri Song-gum	North Korea	2022 Hangzhou	30 September 2023	
55 kg
Snatch	103 kg	Kang Hyon-gyong	North Korea	2022 Hangzhou	30 September 2023	
Clean & Jerk	130 kg	Kang Hyon-gyong	North Korea	2022 Hangzhou	30 September 2023	
Total	233 kg	Kang Hyon-gyong	North Korea	2022 Hangzhou	30 September 2023	
59 kg
Snatch	111 kg	Kim Il-gyong	North Korea	2022 Hangzhou	2 October 2023	
Clean & Jerk	135 kg	Kim Il-gyong	North Korea	2022 Hangzhou	2 October 2023	
Total	246 kg	Kim Il-gyong	North Korea	2022 Hangzhou	2 October 2023	
64 kg
Snatch	111 kg	Rim Un-sim	North Korea	2022 Hangzhou	2 October 2023	
Clean & Jerk	140 kg	Rim Un-sim	North Korea	2022 Hangzhou	2 October 2023	
Total	251 kg	Rim Un-sim	North Korea	2022 Hangzhou	2 October 2023	
76 kg
Snatch	120 kg	Asian Games Standard	—	—	1 November 2018	
Clean & Jerk	151 kg	Asian Games Standard	—	—	1 November 2018	
Total	268 kg	Asian Games Standard	—	—	1 November 2018	
87 kg
Snatch	128 kg	Asian Games Standard	—	—	1 November 2018	
Clean & Jerk	162 kg	Asian Games Standard	—	—	1 November 2018	
Total	287 kg	Asian Games Standard	—	—	1 November 2018	
+87 kg
Snatch	132 kg	Asian Games Standard	—	—	1 November 2018	
Clean & Jerk	177 kg	Asian Games Standard	—	—	1 November 2018	
Total	307 kg	Asian Games Standard	—	—	1 November 2018	

=== Women (1998–2018) ===
Event	Record	Athlete	Nation	Games	Date	Ref
48 kg
Snatch	95 kg	Wang Mingjuan	China	2010 Guangzhou	13 November 2010	
Clean & Jerk	116 kg	Wang Mingjuan	China	2006 Doha	2 December 2006	
Total	210 kg	Wang Mingjuan	China	2010 Guangzhou	13 November 2010	
53 kg
Snatch	103 kg	Li Ping	China	2010 Guangzhou	14 November 2010	
Clean & Jerk	132 kg	Zulfiya Chinshanlo	Kazakhstan	2014 Incheon	21 September 2014	
Total	233 kg	Hsu Shu-ching	Chinese Taipei	2014 Incheon	21 September 2014	
58 kg
Snatch	111 kg	Chen Yanqing	China	2006 Doha	3 December 2006	
Clean & Jerk	140 kg	Chen Yanqing	China	2006 Doha	3 December 2006	
Total	251 kg	Chen Yanqing	China	2006 Doha	3 December 2006	
63 kg
Snatch	116 kg	Lin Tzu-chi	Chinese Taipei	2014 Incheon	23 September 2014	
Clean & Jerk	145 kg	Lin Tzu-chi	Chinese Taipei	2014 Incheon	23 September 2014	
Total	261 kg	Lin Tzu-chi	Chinese Taipei	2014 Incheon	23 September 2014	
69 kg
Snatch	121 kg	Ryo Un-hui	North Korea	2014 Incheon	24 September 2014	
Clean & Jerk	150 kg	Liu Haixia	China	2006 Doha	4 December 2006	
Total	268 kg	Xiang Yanmei	China	2014 Incheon	24 September 2014	
75 kg
Snatch	131 kg	Kang Yue	China	2014 Incheon	25 September 2014	
Clean & Jerk	164 kg	Kim Un-ju	North Korea	2014 Incheon	25 September 2014	
Total	292 kg	Kim Un-ju	North Korea	2014 Incheon	25 September 2014	
+75 kg
Snatch	142 kg	Zhou Lulu	China	2014 Incheon	26 September 2014	
Clean & Jerk	192 kg	Zhou Lulu	China	2014 Incheon	26 September 2014	
Total	334 kg	Zhou Lulu	China	2014 Incheon	26 September 2014	

== See also ==
- List of world records in Olympic weightlifting
- List of Asian records in Olympic weightlifting
