= North Korea at the 2022 Asian Games =

- IOC code: PRK
- NOC: Olympic Committee of the Democratic People's Republic of Korea

in Hangzhou 23 September 2023 – 8 October 2023
- Flag bearers: Pang Chol-mi; Pak Myong-won
- Medals Ranked 10th: Gold 11 Silver 18 Bronze 10 Total 39

Asian Games appearances (overview)
- 1974; 1978; 1982; 1986; 1990; 1994; 1998; 2002; 2006; 2010; 2014; 2018; 2022; 2026

The Democratic People's Republic of Korea competed at the 2022 Asian Games in Hangzhou, Zhejiang, China, from 23 September 2023 to 8 October 2023. Earlier the event was scheduled to held in September 2022 but due to COVID-19 pandemic cases rising in China the event was postponed and rescheduled to September–October 2023. The nation's football opener marked their return to international sport.

North Korea was under sanctions by the World Anti-Doping Agency (WADA) since 2021 due to its national anti-doping body's non-compliance with WADA standards. As a consequence, North Korea was barred from using it flags in international sports competitions except the Olympics and Paralympics but the Olympic Council of Asia allowed the country to use its flag in the Asian Games.

== Archery ==
Recurve Individuals

| Athlete | Event | Ranking Round | | Round of 64 | Round of 32 | Round of 16 | Quarterfinals | Semifinals | Final/Bronze Medal | |
| Athlete | Event | Score | Seed | Opposition Score | Opposition Score | Opposition Score | Opposition Score | Opposition Score | Opposition Score | Rank |
|---|---|---|---|---|---|---|---|---|---|---|
| Han Myong-gyu | Men's Individual | 615 | 67 | Did not advance | | | | | | |
| Kim Kuk-song | Men's Individual | 623 | 63 Q | Chai (HKG); L 4–6 | Did not advance | | | | | |
| Ri Tae-bom | Men's Individual | 637 | 49 Q | Pathairat (THA); L 4–6 | Did not advance | | | | | |
| Kang Un-ju | Women's Individual | 619 | 36 Q | Kanatbek (KGZ); W 6–0 | Chiu (TPE); L 3–7 | Did not advance | | | | |
| Pak Hyang-sun | Women's Individual | 623 | 33 Q | Saloum (KSA); W 6–0 | Đỗ (VIE); L 0–6 | Did not advance | | | | |
| Ri Song-bok | Women's Individual | 596 | 53 | Did not advance | | | | | | |

Team Recurve

| Athlete | Event | Ranking Round | | Round of 32 | Round of 16 | Quarterfinals | Semifinals | Final/Bronze Medal | |
| Athlete | Event | Score | Seed | Opposition Score | Opposition Score | Opposition Score | Opposition Score | Opposition Score | Rank |
|---|---|---|---|---|---|---|---|---|---|
| Han Myong-gyu; Kim Kuk-song; Ri Tae-bom | Men's Team | 1875 | 16 Q | —N/a | South Korea (KOR); L 0–6 | Did not advance | | | |
| Kang Un-ju; Pak Hyang-sun; Ri Song-bok | Women's Team | 1838 | 11 Q | —N/a | Vietnam (VIE); L 2–6 | Did not advance | | | |

== Basketball ==
=== 5×5 basketball ===
| Team | Event | Group stage | | | | Quarterfinal | Semifinals / Pl. | Final / BM / Pl. | |
| Team | Event | Opposition Score | Opposition Score | Opposition Score | Rank | Opposition Score | Opposition Score | Opposition Score | Rank |
|---|---|---|---|---|---|---|---|---|---|
| North Korea women's | Women's tournament | Chinese Taipei; W 91–77 | South Korea; L 62–81 | Thailand; W 105–49 | 2 | India; W 96–57 | China; L 44–100 | South Korea; L 63–93 | 4 |

==== Women's tournament ====
| Pos | Team | Pld | W | L | PF | PA | PD | Pts | Qualification |
|---|---|---|---|---|---|---|---|---|---|
| 1 | South Korea | 3 | 3 | 0 | 258 | 177 | +81 | 6 | Quarterfinals |
| 2 | North Korea | 3 | 2 | 1 | 258 | 207 | +51 | 5 | Quarterfinals |
| 3 | Chinese Taipei | 3 | 1 | 2 | 194 | 232 | −38 | 4 | Quarterfinals |
| 4 | Thailand | 3 | 0 | 3 | 159 | 253 | −94 | 3 | |

Source: OCA

Group stage

27 September
13:30

Report

| Chinese Taipei | 77–91 | North Korea |
Scoring by quarter: 17–14, 16–22, 25–33, 19–22
| Pts: Lo, Chen W. 12; Rebs: Chen W. 8 Asts: Cheng 6 | | Pts: Pak J. 51; Rebs: Pak J. 14; Asts: Ro 11 |

Olympic Center Gymnasium, Shaoxing
Referees: Yana Nikogossyan (KAZ), Ahmad Al-Yousef (JOR), Anan Daraghma (PLE)

29 September
17:30

Report

| North Korea | 62–81 | South Korea |
Scoring by quarter: 13–11, 12–22, 17–29, 20–19
| Pts: Pak J. 29; Rebs: Pak J. 17; Asts: Ro 9 | | Pts: Park J.S. 18; Rebs: Park J.S. 13; Asts: Kim 7 |

Olympic Expo Center Gymnasium, Hangzhou
Referees: Paul Skayem (LBN), Alexey Stepanenko (KAZ), Tee Yong Sern (MAS)

1 October
13:30

Report

| North Korea | 105–49 | Thailand |
Scoring by quarter: 27–16, 26–14, 29–10, 23–9
| Pts: Pak J. 36; Rebs: Pak J. 14; Asts: Kang 13 | | Pts: Udomsuk 15; Rebs: Lumdabpang 6 Asts: Thuamon 3 |

Olympic Center Gymnasium, Shaoxing
Referees: Taha Al-Hashedi (YEM), Mohammad Rajabi (IRI), Totie Celeste (PHI)

Quarter-finals

2 October
16:00

Report

| India | 57–96 | North Korea |
Scoring by quarter: 20–26, 6–26, 17–22, 14–22
| Pts: Rani 16; Rebs: Kumar 6 Asts: Kumar, A. Kaur, Rani 2 | | Pts: Hong, Pak J. 29; Rebs: Pak J. 10; Asts: Ro 13 |

Olympic Center Gymnasium, Shaoxing
Referees: Yu Yijing (CHN), Yana Nikogossyan (KAZ), Song Houlu (CHN)

Semi-finals

3 October
16:00

Report

| North Korea | 44–100 | China |
Scoring by quarter: 6–22, 21–26, 11–29, 6–23
| Pts: Hong 14; Rebs: Ro 8 Asts: Ro 5 | | Pts: Li Yue. 25; Rebs: Li Yue. 15; Asts: Li Yua. 8 |

Olympic Expo Center Gymnasium, Hangzhou
Referees: Yana Nikogossyan (KAZ), Bandar Al-Suwaidi (QAT), Tee Yong Sern (MAS)

Bronze medal game

5 October
16:00

Report

| North Korea | 63–93 | South Korea |
Scoring by quarter: 21–15, 12–25, 11–21, 19–32
| Pts: Pak J. 27; Rebs: Pak J. 9 Asts: Kang, Ro 5 | | Pts: Park J.S. 25; Rebs: Park J.S. 10; Asts: An, Park J.S. 7 |

Olympic Expo Center Gymnasium, Hangzhou
Referees: Yuen Chun Yip (HKG), Hu Jing (CHN), Ahmed Al-Khamees (KSA)

== Football ==
Summary

Key:

- A.E.T – After extra time.
- P – Match decided by penalty-shootout.

| Team | Event | Group Stage | | | | Round of 16 | Quarterfinal | Semifinal | Final / BM | |
| Team | Event | Opposition Score | Opposition Score | Opposition Score | Rank | Opposition Score | Opposition Score | Opposition Score | Opposition Score | Rank |
|---|---|---|---|---|---|---|---|---|---|---|
| North Korea men's | Men's tournament | Chinese Taipei; W 2–0 | Kyrgyzstan; W 1–0 | Indonesia; W 1–0 | 1 Q | Bahrain; W 2–0 | Japan; L 1–2 | Did not advance | | 5 |
| North Korea women's | Women's tournament | Singapore; W 7–0 | Singapore; W 10–0 | —N/a | 1 Q | —N/a | South Korea; W 4–1 | Uzbekistan; W 8–0 | Japan; L 1–4 | 2nd place, silver medalist(s) |

=== Men's tournament ===
Group F

| Pos | Team | Pld | W | D | L | GF | GA | GD | Pts | Qualification |
|---|---|---|---|---|---|---|---|---|---|---|
| 1 | North Korea | 3 | 3 | 0 | 0 | 4 | 0 | +4 | 9 | Knockout stage |
| 2 | Kyrgyzstan | 3 | 1 | 0 | 2 | 4 | 4 | 0 | 3 (Note: Head-to-head goal differences: Kyrgyzstan 4–3, Indonesia 2–1, Chinese Taipei 2–4) | Knockout stage |
| 3 | Indonesia | 3 | 1 | 0 | 2 | 2 | 2 | 0 | 3 | Knockout stage |
| 4 | Chinese Taipei | 3 | 1 | 0 | 2 | 2 | 6 | −4 | 3 | |

Source: Football – Men – Groups
Rules for classification: Group stage tierbreakers
Notes:
19 September 2023
16:00

| North Korea | 2–0 | Chinese Taipei |
|---|---|---|
| Ri Jo-guk 7'; Kim Kuk-jin 12' | Report |

Zhejiang Normal University East Stadium, Jinhua
Attendance: 1,248
Referee: Yousif Saeed Hasan (Iraq)
21 September 2023
19:30

| Kyrgyzstan | 0–1 | North Korea |
|---|---|---|
| | Report | Kim Kuk-jin 20' |

Zhejiang Normal University East Stadium, Jinhua
Attendance: 1,235
Referee: Ali Reda (Lebanon)
24 September 2023
16:00

| North Korea | 1–0 | Indonesia |
|---|---|---|
| Kim Yu-song 40' | Report |

Zhejiang Normal University East Stadium, Jinhua
Attendance: 7,288
Referee: Khalid Al-Turais (Saudi Arabia)

Round of 16

27 September 2023
16:30 UTC+8

| North Korea | 2–0 | Bahrain |
|---|---|---|
| Kang Kuk-chol 45+5'; Kim Kuk-bom 63' | Report |

Zhejiang Normal University East Stadium, Jinhua
Attendance: 7,321
Referee: Adel Al Naqbi (United Arab Emirates)

Quarter-finals

1 October 2023
19:30 UTC+8

| Japan | 2–1 | North Korea |
|---|---|---|
| Uchino 50'; Matsumura 80' (pen.) | Report | Kim Kuk-bom 74' |

Xiaoshan Sports Centre Stadium, Hangzhou
Attendance: 7,476
Referee: Rustam Lutfullin (Uzbekistan)

=== Women's tournament ===
Group C

| Pos | Team | Pld | W | D | L | GF | GA | GD | Pts | Qualification |
|---|---|---|---|---|---|---|---|---|---|---|
| 1 | North Korea | 2 | 2 | 0 | 0 | 17 | 0 | +17 | 6 | Knockout stage |
| 2 | Singapore | 2 | 0 | 0 | 2 | 0 | 17 | −17 | 0 | |
| 3 | Cambodia | 0 | 0 | 0 | 0 | 0 | 0 | 0 | 0 | Withdrew |

Source: Football – Women – Groups
Rules for classification: Group stage tiebreakers
24 September 2023
19:30 UTC+8

| North Korea | 7–0 | Singapore |
|---|---|---|
| Hong Song-ok 11'; Ri Kum-hyang 14'; Myong Yu-jong 51'; Ju Hyo-sim 54'; Ri Hak 58'; Kim Kyong-yong 62'; Sung Hyang-sim 90+3' | Report |

Wenzhou Sports Center Stadium, Wenzhou
Attendance: 5,320
Referee: Haneen Murad (Jordan)

27 September 2023
16:00 UTC+8

| Singapore | 0–10 | North Korea |
|---|---|---|
| | Report | Kim Kyong-yong 3', 19' (pen.), 36', 45+1', 90+7'; An Myong-Song 15', 60'; Ri Myong-Gum 17'; Myong Yu-jong 42'; Pong Song-Ae 71' |

Wenzhou Sports Center Stadium, Wenzhou
Attendance: 3,669
Referee: Doumouh Al Bakkar (Lebanon)

Quarter-finals

30 September 2023
16:30 UTC+8

| South Korea | 1–4 | North Korea |
|---|---|---|
| An Myong-Song 11' (o.g.) | Report | Ri Hak 20', 90'; An Myong-Song 81'; Kim Kyong-yong 90+5' (pen.) |

Wenzhou Sports Centre Stadium, Wenzhou
Attendance: 6,171
Referee: Chaisanit Pansa (Thailand)

Semi-finals

3 October 2023
18:00 UTC+8

| Uzbekistan | 0–8 | North Korea |
|---|---|---|
| | Report | Hong Song-ok 9'; Kim Kyong-yong 18' (pen.), 46', 63', 83'; An Myong-Song 45+2'; Ri Hak 50'; Kim Hye-yong 90+1' |

Shangcheng Sports Centre Stadium, Hangzhou
Attendance: 10,402
Referee: Le Thi Ly (Vietnam)

Final

6 October 2023
20:00 UTC+8

| (gold) Japan | 4–1 | North Korea (silver) |
|---|---|---|
| Nakashima 10'; Osawa 66'; Tanikawa 69'; Chiba 72' | Report | Kim Kyong-yong 38' |

Huanglong Sports Centre Stadium, Hangzhou
Attendance: 37,166
Referee: Veronika Bernatskaia (Kyrgyzstan)

== Volleyball ==
| Team | Event | Group Stage | | | Second Round | | Semifinal / Pl. | Final / BM / Pl. | |
| Team | Event | Opposition Score | Opposition Score | Rank | Opposition Score | Opposition Score | Opposition Score | Opposition Score | Rank |
|---|---|---|---|---|---|---|---|---|---|
| North Korea women's | Women's tournament | India; W 3–1 | China; L 0–3 | 2 | Vietnam; L 1–3 | South Korea; L 1–3 | Chinese Taipei; L 1–3 | Kazakhstan; W 3–2 | 7 |

=== Women's tournament ===
==== Pool A ====
| Pos | Team | Pld | W | L | Pts | SW | SL | SR | SPW | SPL | SPR | Qualification |
|---|---|---|---|---|---|---|---|---|---|---|---|---|
| 1 | China | 2 | 2 | 0 | 6 | 6 | 0 | MAX | 150 | 63 | 2.381 | Pool E |
| 2 | North Korea | 2 | 1 | 1 | 3 | 3 | 4 | 0.750 | 134 | 155 | 0.865 | Pool E |
| 3 | India | 2 | 0 | 2 | 0 | 1 | 6 | 0.167 | 107 | 173 | 0.618 | Pool G |

Source: Volleyball at the 2022 Asian Hangzhou Games

| Date | Time | | Score | | Set 1 | Set 2 | Set 3 | Set 4 | Set 5 | Total | Report |
|---|---|---|---|---|---|---|---|---|---|---|---|
| 30 Sep | 10:30 | India | 1–3 | North Korea | 25–23 | 22–25 | 17–25 | 16–25 | | 80–98 | |
| 2 Oct | 19:00 | North Korea | 0–3 | China | 13–25 | 15–25 | 8–25 | | | 36–75 | |

== Weightlifting ==
Men

| Athlete | Event | Snatch | | Clean & Jerk | | Total | Rank |
| Athlete | Event | Result | Rank | Result | Rank | Total | Rank |
|---|---|---|---|---|---|---|---|
| Pak Myong-jin | 61 kg | 136 | 2 | 171 JWR | 1 | 307 JWR | 2nd place, silver medalist(s) |
| Kim Chung-guk | 61 kg | 127 | 8 | 171 | 2 | 298 | 3rd place, bronze medalist(s) |
| Ri Won-ju | 67 kg | 141 | 3 | 180 | 1 | 321 | 2nd place, silver medalist(s) |
| Oh Kum-thaek | 73 kg | 151 | 5 | 193 | 2 | 344 | 3rd place, bronze medalist(s) |
| Pak Jong-ju | 73 kg | 151 | 4 | 188 | 4 | 339 | 4 |
| Ri Chong-song | 81 kg | 169 GR | 1 | 195 | 1 | 364 GR | 1st place, gold medalist(s) |
| Ro Kwang-ryol | 96 kg | 170 | 5 | 216 GR | 1 | 386 | 2nd place, silver medalist(s) |

Women

| Athlete | Event | Snatch | | Clean & Jerk | | Total | Rank |
| Athlete | Event | Result | Rank | Result | Rank | Total | Rank |
|---|---|---|---|---|---|---|---|
| Ri Song-gum | 49 kg | 92 NR | 2 | 124 WR | 1 | 216 WR | 1st place, gold medalist(s) |
| Kang Hyon-gyong | 55 kg | 103 WR | 1 | 130 WR | 1 | 233 WR | 1st place, gold medalist(s) |
| Ri Su-yon | 55 kg | 96 | 2 | 126 | 2 | 222 | 2nd place, silver medalist(s) |
| Kim Il-gyong | 59 kg | 111 WR | 1 | 135 GR, JWR | 1 | 246 GR, JWR | 1st place, gold medalist(s) |
| Rim Un-sim | 64 kg | 111 GR | 1 | 140 GR | 1 | 251 GR | 1st place, gold medalist(s) |
| Song Kuk-hyang | 76 kg | 117 | 1 | 150 | 1 | 267 | 1st place, gold medalist(s) |
| Jong Chun-hui | 76 kg | 117 | 2 | 149 | 2 | 266 | 2nd place, silver medalist(s) |
