= Weightlifting at the 2014 Asian Games – Men's 94 kg =

Men's 94 kg at the 2014 Asian Games
- Venue: Moonlight Festival Garden Venue
- Date: 25 September 2014
- Competitors: 16 from 13 nations

Medalists
gold medal	Liu Hao	China
silver medal	Almas Uteshov	Kazakhstan
bronze medal	Lee Chang-ho	South Korea

The men's 94 kilograms event at the 2014 Asian Games took place on 25 September 2014 at Moonlight Festival Garden Weightlifting Venue.

== Schedule ==
All times are Korea Standard Time (UTC+09:00)

Date	Time	Event
Thursday, 25 September 2014	12:00	Group B
Thursday, 25 September 2014	19:00	Group A

== Records ==
Prior to this competition, the existing world, Asian and Games records were as follows.

World Record	Snatch	Akakios Kakiasvilis (GRE)	188 kg	Athens, Greece	27 November 1999
World Record	Clean & Jerk	~~Ilya Ilyin (KAZ)~~; Szymon Kołecki (POL)	~~233 kg~~ 232 kg	~~London, United Kingdom~~; Sofia, Bulgaria	~~4 August 2012~~; 29 April 2000
World Record	Total	~~Ilya Ilyin (KAZ)~~; Akakios Kakiasvilis (GRE)	~~418 kg~~ 412 kg	~~London, United Kingdom~~; Athens, Greece	~~4 August 2012~~; 27 November 1999
Asian Record	Snatch	Kourosh Bagheri (IRI)	187 kg	Sydney, Australia	24 September 2000
Asian Record	Clean & Jerk	~~Ilya Ilyin (KAZ)~~; Ilya Ilyin (KAZ)	~~233 kg~~ 226 kg	~~London, United Kingdom~~; Doha, Qatar	~~4 August 2012~~; 5 December 2006
Asian Record	Total	~~Ilya Ilyin (KAZ)~~; Kourosh Bagheri (IRI)	~~418 kg~~ 407 kg	~~London, United Kingdom~~; Antalya, Turkey	~~4 August 2012~~; 9 November 2001
Games Record	Snatch	Bakhyt Akhmetov (KAZ)	185 kg	Busan, South Korea	8 October 2002
Games Record	Clean & Jerk	Ilya Ilyin (KAZ)	226 kg	Doha, Qatar	5 December 2006
Games Record	Total	Bakhyt Akhmetov (KAZ)	400 kg	Busan, South Korea	8 October 2002

- Ilya Ilyin's world and Asian records were rescinded in 2016.

== Results ==
Legend

- NM — No mark

Rank	Athlete	Group	Body weight	Snatch (kg)				Clean & Jerk (kg)				Total
Rank	Athlete	Group	Body weight	1	2	3	Result	1	2	3	Result	Total
1st place, gold medalist(s)	Liu Hao (CHN)	A	93.52	165	171	173	173	210	215	221	221	394
2nd place, silver medalist(s)	Almas Uteshov (KAZ)	A	93.32	170	175	~~177~~	175	212	~~218~~	218	218	393
3rd place, bronze medalist(s)	Lee Chang-ho (KOR)	A	93.52	155	~~160~~	160	160	200	207	—	207	367
4	Sarat Sumpradit (THA)	A	93.38	161	166	~~170~~	166	200	~~205~~	~~205~~	200	366
5	Jasurbek Jumaýew (TKM)	A	92.40	161	~~168~~	~~170~~	161	195	~~205~~	~~205~~	195	356
6	Pitaya Tibnoke (THA)	A	93.17	148	152	155	155	196	~~202~~	~~202~~	196	351
7	Yuki Hiraoka (JPN)	A	92.71	150	~~155~~	~~161~~	150	180	~~185~~	185	185	335
8	Abbas Al-Qaisoum (KSA)	A	91.78	145	~~150~~	~~152~~	145	174	178	~~181~~	178	323
9	Mustafa Al-Mulad (KSA)	B	90.34	~~134~~	~~134~~	134	134	155	162	167	167	301
10	Yousef Yaqoub (KUW)	B	88.99	120	125	127	127	157	162	169	169	296
11	Azizjon Shukurov (TJK)	B	93.88	117	123	~~130~~	123	155	165	~~170~~	165	288
12	Omar Al-Karaki (JOR)	B	88.40	115	120	~~125~~	120	155	160	~~166~~	160	280
13	Alyeksyeigiin Amartögs (MGL)	B	93.67	110	~~117~~	117	117	140	~~150~~	~~150~~	140	257
14	Hamid Al-Otaibi (KUW)	B	88.97	95	~~110~~	110	110	120	130	~~141~~	130	240
15	Hamdan Al-Marri (QAT)	B	92.47	52	57	~~61~~	57	75	80	83	83	140
—	Raad Ameen (IRQ)	A	87.06	~~152~~	~~152~~	~~155~~	—	—	—	—	—	NM
