= Weightlifting at the 2010 Asian Games – Women's 48 kg =

Women's 48 kg at the 2010 Asian Games
- Venue: Dongguan Arena
- Date: 13 November 2010
- Competitors: 8 from 6 nations

Medalists
gold medal	Wang Mingjuan	China
silver medal	Pensiri Laosirikul	Thailand
bronze medal	Chen Wei-ling	Chinese Taipei

The women's 48 kilograms event at the 2010 Asian Games took place on 13 November 2010 at Dongguan Arena.

== Schedule ==
All times are China Standard Time (UTC+08:00)

Date	Time	Event
Saturday, 13 November 2010	14:30	Group B
Saturday, 13 November 2010	19:00	Group A

== Records ==
Prior to this competition, the existing world, Asian and Games records were as follows.

World Record	Snatch	Yang Lian (CHN)	98 kg	Santo Domingo, Dominican Rep.	1 October 2006
World Record	Clean & Jerk	~~Nurcan Taylan (TUR)~~; Chen Xiexia (CHN)	~~121 kg~~ 120 kg	~~Antalya, Turkey~~; Tai'an, China	~~17 September 2010~~; 21 April 2007
World Record	Total	Yang Lian (CHN)	217 kg	Santo Domingo, Dominican Rep.	1 October 2006
Asian Record	Snatch	Yang Lian (CHN)	98 kg	Santo Domingo, Dominican Rep.	1 October 2006
Asian Record	Clean & Jerk	Chen Xiexia (CHN)	120 kg	Tai'an, China	21 April 2007
Asian Record	Total	Yang Lian (CHN)	217 kg	Santo Domingo, Dominican Rep.	1 October 2006
Games Record	Snatch	Kay Thi Win (MYA)	90 kg	Busan, South Korea	30 September 2002
Games Record	Clean & Jerk	Wang Mingjuan (CHN)	116 kg	Doha, Qatar	2 December 2006
Games Record	Total	Wang Mingjuan (CHN)	206 kg	Doha, Qatar	2 December 2006

- Nurcan Taylan's world record was rescinded in 2021.

== Results ==
Legend

- NM — No mark

Rank	Athlete	Group	Body weight	Snatch (kg)				Clean & Jerk (kg)				Total
Rank	Athlete	Group	Body weight	1	2	3	Result	1	2	3	Result	Total
1st place, gold medalist(s)	Wang Mingjuan (CHN)	A	47.84	89	91	95	95	110	115	~~117~~	115	210
2nd place, silver medalist(s)	Pensiri Laosirikul (THA)	A	47.28	~~83~~	83	~~86~~	83	103	109	~~114~~	109	192
3rd place, bronze medalist(s)	Chen Wei-ling (TPE)	A	47.24	83	86	~~88~~	86	105	~~110~~	~~110~~	105	191
4	Pramsiri Bunphithak (THA)	A	47.25	~~80~~	80	~~83~~	80	95	101	~~103~~	101	181
5	Ngangbam Soniya Chanu (IND)	B	47.91	~~70~~	70	75	75	90	95	~~99~~	95	170
6	Atom Sandyarani Devi (IND)	B	47.92	66	70	~~73~~	70	84	88	~~91~~	88	158
7	Molla Shabira (BAN)	B	47.91	60	~~65~~	~~65~~	60	70	75	~~77~~	75	135
—	Nguyễn Thị Hồng (VIE)	B	47.17	~~60~~	60	65	65	~~85~~	~~85~~	—	—	NM

== New records ==
The following records were established during the competition.

Snatch	91	Wang Mingjuan (CHN)	GR
Snatch	95	Wang Mingjuan (CHN)	GR
Total	210	Wang Mingjuan (CHN)	GR
