= Weightlifting at the 2022 Asian Games – Women's 64 kg =

Women's 64 kg at the 2022 Asian Games
- Venue: Xiaoshan Sports Center Gymnasium
- Date: 2 October 2023
- Competitors: 14 from 14 nations

Medalists
gold medal	Rim Un-sim	North Korea
silver medal	Pei Xinyi	China
bronze medal	Elreen Ando	Philippines

The women's 64 kilograms competition at the 2022 Asian Games took place on 2 October 2023 at Xiaoshan Sports Center Gymnasium.

== Schedule ==
All times are China Standard Time (UTC+08:00)

Date	Time	Event
Monday, 2 October 2023	10:00	Group B
Monday, 2 October 2023	19:00	Group A

== Records ==
Prior to this competition, the existing world, Asian and Games records were as follows.

World Record	Snatch	Deng Wei (CHN)	117 kg	Tianjin, China	11 December 2019
World Record	Clean & Jerk	Deng Wei (CHN)	145 kg	Pattaya, Thailand	20 September 2019
World Record	Total	Deng Wei (CHN)	261 kg	Pattaya, Thailand	20 September 2019
Asian Record	Snatch	Deng Wei (CHN)	117 kg	Tianjin, China	11 December 2019
Asian Record	Clean & Jerk	Deng Wei (CHN)	145 kg	Pattaya, Thailand	20 September 2019
Asian Record	Total	Deng Wei (CHN)	261 kg	Pattaya, Thailand	20 September 2019
Games Record	Snatch	Asian Games Standard	108 kg	—	1 November 2018
Games Record	Clean & Jerk	Asian Games Standard	135 kg	—	1 November 2018
Games Record	Total	Asian Games Standard	242 kg	—	1 November 2018

== Results ==
Legend

- NM — No mark

Rank	Athlete	Group	Snatch (kg)				Clean & Jerk (kg)				Total
Rank	Athlete	Group	1	2	3	Result	1	2	3	Result	Total
1st place, gold medalist(s)	Rim Un-sim (PRK)	A	105	111	~~118~~	111	135	~~140~~	140	140	251
2nd place, silver medalist(s)	Pei Xinyi (CHN)	A	98	102	104	104	125	130	~~133~~	130	234
3rd place, bronze medalist(s)	Elreen Ando (PHI)	A	93	~~95~~	96	96	117	122	126	126	222
4	Tsabitha Alfiah Ramadani (INA)	B	95	100	~~102~~	100	115	~~120~~	~~120~~	115	215
5	Karina Goricheva (KAZ)	A	93	96	~~98~~	96	107	111	114	114	210
6	Sumire Hashimoto (JPN)	A	~~90~~	90	~~93~~	90	113	115	~~121~~	115	205
7	Han Ji-an (KOR)	A	93	~~96~~	~~97~~	93	111	~~115~~	~~115~~	111	204
8	Shakhlokhon Abdullaeva (UZB)	A	88	~~92~~	~~93~~	88	107	110	~~113~~	110	198
9	Thipwara Chontavin (THA)	B	83	86	~~89~~	86	~~102~~	102	105	105	191
10	Jurelena Juna (BRU)	B	75	78	81	81	95	100	~~105~~	100	181
11	Mabia Akhter (BAN)	B	73	77	~~80~~	77	~~98~~	~~98~~	98	98	175
12	Sharada Chaudhary (NEP)	B	~~70~~	70	~~74~~	70	88	~~94~~	~~94~~	88	158
—	Reihaneh Karimi (IRI)	A	~~89~~	~~89~~	~~91~~	—	—	—	—	—	NM
—	Ganzorigiin Anuujin (MGL)	A	~~93~~	~~94~~	~~94~~	—	—	—	—	—	NM

== New records ==
The following records were established during the competition.

Snatch	111	Rim Un-sim (PRK)	GR
Clean & Jerk	140	Rim Un-sim (PRK)	GR
Total	246	Rim Un-sim (PRK)	GR
Total	251	Rim Un-sim (PRK)	GR
