= Weightlifting at the 2022 Asian Games – Women's 55 kg =

Women's 55 kg at the 2022 Asian Games
- Venue: Xiaoshan Sports Center Gymnasium
- Date: 30 September 2023
- Competitors: 15 from 12 nations

Medalists
gold medal	Kang Hyon-gyong	North Korea
silver medal	Ri Su-yon	North Korea
bronze medal	Hou Zhihui	China

The women's 55 kilograms competition at the 2022 Asian Games took place on 30 September 2023 at Xiaoshan Sports Center Gymnasium.

== Schedule ==
All times are China Standard Time (UTC+08:00)

Date	Time	Event
Saturday, 30 September 2023	10:00	Group B
Saturday, 30 September 2023	19:00	Group A

== Records ==
Prior to this competition, the existing world, Asian and Games records were as follows.

World Record	Snatch	Li Yajun (CHN)	102 kg	Ashgabat, Turkmenistan	3 November 2018
World Record	Clean & Jerk	Liao Qiuyun (CHN)	129 kg	Pattaya, Thailand	20 September 2019
World Record	Total	Liao Qiuyun (CHN)	227 kg	Pattaya, Thailand	20 September 2019
Asian Record	Snatch	Li Yajun (CHN)	102 kg	Ashgabat, Turkmenistan	3 November 2018
Asian Record	Clean & Jerk	Liao Qiuyun (CHN)	129 kg	Pattaya, Thailand	20 September 2019
Asian Record	Total	Liao Qiuyun (CHN)	227 kg	Pattaya, Thailand	20 September 2019
Games Record	Snatch	Asian Games Standard	97 kg	—	1 November 2018
Games Record	Clean & Jerk	Asian Games Standard	122 kg	—	1 November 2018
Games Record	Total	Asian Games Standard	218 kg	—	1 November 2018

== Results ==
Legend

- NM — No mark

Rank	Athlete	Group	Snatch (kg)				Clean & Jerk (kg)				Total
Rank	Athlete	Group	1	2	3	Result	1	2	3	Result	Total
1st place, gold medalist(s)	Kang Hyon-gyong (PRK)	A	96	100	103	103	120	125	130	130	233
2nd place, silver medalist(s)	Ri Su-yon (PRK)	A	93	96	~~98~~	96	116	121	126	126	222
3rd place, bronze medalist(s)	Hou Zhihui (CHN)	A	90	95	~~97~~	95	110	115	—	115	210
4	Chen Guan-ling (TPE)	A	~~90~~	90	~~93~~	90	108	~~111~~	~~111~~	108	198
5	Bindyarani Devi (IND)	A	80	~~83~~	83	83	109	~~113~~	113	113	196
6	Nigora Abdullaeva (UZB)	A	~~83~~	83	87	87	103	106	108	108	195
7	Jamila Panfilova (UZB)	A	83	86	88	88	100	104	~~106~~	104	192
8	Yu Won-ju (KOR)	A	82	85	87	87	100	104	~~108~~	104	191
9	Juliana Klarisa (INA)	A	78	80	82	82	103	~~107~~	~~107~~	103	185
10	Natcha Kaewnoi (THA)	A	73	76	78	78	93	97	100	100	178
11	Srity Akter (BAN)	B	67	70	72	72	88	~~92~~	~~92~~	88	160
12	Tika Maya Gurung (NEP)	B	~~60~~	~~60~~	60	60	80	86	~~90~~	86	146
13	Subreen Dari (PLE)	B	57	59	~~61~~	59	~~74~~	74	~~77~~	74	133
—	Windy Cantika Aisah (INA)	A	81	85	~~88~~	85	~~100~~	~~100~~	~~100~~	—	NM
DQ	Buyandelgeriin Erdenezul (MGL)	B	~~70~~	~~70~~	70	70	80	85	87	87	~~157~~

- Buyandelgeriin Erdenezul of Mongolia originally finished 12th, but was disqualified after she tested positive for Drostanolone.

== New records ==
The following records were established during the competition.

Snatch	100	Kang Hyon-gyong (PRK)	GR
Snatch	103	Kang Hyon-gyong (PRK)	WR
Clean & Jerk	125	Kang Hyon-gyong (PRK)	GR
Clean & Jerk	126	Ri Su-yon (PRK)	GR
Clean & Jerk	130	Kang Hyon-gyong (PRK)	WR
Total	223	Kang Hyon-gyong (PRK)	GR
Total	228	Kang Hyon-gyong (PRK)	WR
Total	233	Kang Hyon-gyong (PRK)	WR
