= Weightlifting at the 2022 Asian Games – Men's 96 kg =

Men's 96 kg at the 2022 Asian Games
- Venue: Xiaoshan Sports Center Gymnasium
- Date: 5 October 2023
- Competitors: 18 from 13 nations

Medalists
gold medal	Tian Tao	China
silver medal	Ro Kwang-ryol	North Korea
bronze medal	Sarat Sumpradit	Thailand

The men's 96 kilograms competition at the 2022 Asian Games took place on 5 October 2023 at Xiaoshan Sports Center Gymnasium.

== Schedule ==
All times are China Standard Time (UTC+08:00)

Date	Time	Event
Thursday, 5 October 2023	10:00	Group B
Thursday, 5 October 2023	15:00	Group A

== Records ==
Prior to this competition, the existing world, Asian and Games records were as follows.

World Record	Snatch	Lesman Paredes (COL)	187 kg	Tashkent, Uzbekistan	14 December 2021
World Record	Clean & Jerk	Tian Tao (CHN)	231 kg	Tokyo, Japan	7 July 2019
World Record	Total	Sohrab Moradi (IRI)	416 kg	Ashgabat, Turkmenistan	7 November 2018
Asian Record	Snatch	Sohrab Moradi (IRI)	186 kg	Ashgabat, Turkmenistan	7 November 2018
Asian Record	Clean & Jerk	Tian Tao (CHN)	231 kg	Tokyo, Japan	7 July 2019
Asian Record	Total	Sohrab Moradi (IRI)	416 kg	Ashgabat, Turkmenistan	7 November 2018
Games Record	Snatch	Asian Games Standard	180 kg	—	1 November 2018
Games Record	Clean & Jerk	Asian Games Standard	215 kg	—	1 November 2018
Games Record	Total	Asian Games Standard	390 kg	—	1 November 2018

== Results ==
Legend

- NM — No mark

Rank	Athlete	Group	Snatch (kg)				Clean & Jerk (kg)				Total
Rank	Athlete	Group	1	2	3	Result	1	2	3	Result	Total
1st place, gold medalist(s)	Tian Tao (CHN)	A	171	176	180	180	~~210~~	210	~~216~~	210	390
2nd place, silver medalist(s)	Ro Kwang-ryol (PRK)	A	165	170	~~173~~	170	211	216	~~221~~	216	386
3rd place, bronze medalist(s)	Sarat Sumpradit (THA)	A	172	~~176~~	176	176	~~208~~	~~208~~	208	208	384
4	Li Dayin (CHN)	A	170	176	~~181~~	176	206	~~215~~	~~215~~	206	382
5	Qasim Hasan (IRQ)	A	~~173~~	173	177	177	203	~~207~~	~~207~~	203	380
6	Won Jong-beom (KOR)	A	~~170~~	~~170~~	170	170	205	~~215~~	~~215~~	205	375
7	Assylzhan Bektay (KAZ)	A	161	~~166~~	169	169	195	~~201~~	202	202	371
8	Amir Hoghoughi (IRI)	A	160	164	~~167~~	164	202	~~209~~	~~209~~	202	366
9	Mirmostafa Javadi (IRI)	A	~~161~~	161	~~168~~	161	202	~~212~~	~~214~~	202	363
10	Sunnatilla Usarov (UZB)	A	160	165	~~168~~	165	190	~~195~~	~~195~~	190	355
11	Şatlyk Şöhradow (TKM)	A	158	~~162~~	~~164~~	158	190	195	~~198~~	195	353
12	Sergey Petrovich (KAZ)	B	150	~~155~~	156	156	180	185	—	185	341
13	Emil Moldodosov (KGZ)	B	150	~~155~~	155	155	175	~~182~~	~~182~~	175	330
14	Nursultan Tarmalov (KGZ)	B	135	~~140~~	—	135	155	165	172	172	307
15	Vishal Singh Bist (NEP)	B	121	127	133	133	161	168	~~175~~	168	301
16	Adilbishiin Ichinnorov (MGL)	B	~~113~~	113	117	117	137	141	145	145	262
17	Bayarmagnain Tsolmon (MGL)	B	~~112~~	112	~~116~~	112	~~127~~	127	~~138~~	127	239
—	Chen Po-jen (TPE)	A	163	~~168~~	~~172~~	163	—	—	—	—	NM

== New records ==
The following records were established during the competition.

Clean & Jerk	216	Ro Kwang-ryol (PRK)	GR
