= Weightlifting at the 2026 Asian Games – Men's 70 kg =

Men's 70 kg at the 2026 Asian Games
- Venue: Nagoya Trade & Industry Center
- Date: 26 September 2026
- Competitors: 9 from 9 nations

Medalists
gold medal	Ri Won-ju	North Korea
silver medal	Masanori Miyamoto	Japan
bronze medal	Albert Delos Santos	Philippines

The men's 70 kilograms competition at the 2026 Asian Games was held on 26 September 2026 at the Nagoya Trade & Industry Center.

== Schedule ==
All times are Japan Standard Time (UTC+09:00)

Date	Time	Event
Saturday, 26 September 2026	13:30	Group A

== Records ==
Prior to this competition, the existing world, Asian and Games records were as follows.

World Record	Snatch	World Standard	153 kg	—	1 August 2026
World Record	Clean & Jerk	World Standard	188 kg	—	1 August 2026
World Record	Total	World Standard	336 kg	—	1 August 2026
Asian Record	Snatch	Asian Standard	152 kg	—	1 August 2026
Asian Record	Clean & Jerk	Asian Standard	188 kg	—	1 August 2026
Asian Record	Total	Asian Standard	334 kg	—	1 August 2026
Games Record	Snatch	Asian Games Standard	151 kg	—	1 August 2026
Games Record	Clean & Jerk	Asian Games Standard	183 kg	—	1 August 2026
Games Record	Total	Asian Games Standard	329 kg	—	1 August 2026

== Results ==
Rank	Athlete	Group	Snatch (kg)				Clean & Jerk (kg)				Total
Rank	Athlete	Group	1	2	3	Result	1	2	3	Result	Total
1st place, gold medalist(s)	Ri Won-ju (PRK)	A	~~146~~	146	151	151	187	192	198	198	349
2nd place, silver medalist(s)	Masanori Miyamoto (JPN)	A	147	152	154	154	183	188	~~193~~	188	342
3rd place, bronze medalist(s)	Albert Delos Santos (PHI)	A	138	141	~~143~~	141	178	181	183	183	324
4	Adkhamjon Ergashev (UZB)	A	137	140	142	142	176	~~180~~	~~181~~	176	318
5	Chen Wang-heng (TPE)	A	135	139	~~142~~	139	170	175	~~180~~	175	314
6	Teerawat Ratphet (THA)	A	~~137~~	137	~~140~~	137	~~170~~	~~170~~	170	170	307
7	Elyas Al-Busaidi (OMA)	A	117	121	~~126~~	121	143	150	~~155~~	150	271
8	Sumiyaagiin Gantsooj (MGL)	A	106	111	115	115	127	131	135	135	250
9	Nivio Soares (TLS)	A	95	100	105	105	110	120	~~130~~	120	225

== New records ==
The following records were established during the competition.

Snatch	152	Masanori Miyamoto (JPN)	GR
Snatch	154	Masanori Miyamoto (JPN)	WR
Clean & Jerk	187	Ri Won-ju (PRK)	GR
Clean & Jerk	188	Masanori Miyamoto (JPN)	GR
Clean & Jerk	192	Ri Won-ju (PRK)	WR
Clean & Jerk	198	Ri Won-ju (PRK)	WR
Total	337	Masanori Miyamoto (JPN)	WR
Total	338	Pak Myong-jin (PRK)	WR
Total	342	Masanori Miyamoto (JPN)	WR
Total	343	Pak Myong-jin (PRK)	WR
Total	349	Pak Myong-jin (PRK)	WR
