= Weightlifting at the 2018 Asian Games – Men's 94 kg =

Men's weightlifting competition in the 2018 Asian Games

Men's 94 kg at the 2018 Asian Games
- Venue: Jakarta International Expo
- Date: 25 August 2018
- Competitors: 10 from 9 nations

Medalists
gold medal	Sohrab Moradi	Iran
silver medal	Fares El-Bakh	Qatar
bronze medal	Sarat Sumpradit	Thailand

The Men's 94 kilograms event at the 2018 Asian Games took place on 25 August 2018 at the Jakarta International Expo Hall A.

== Schedule ==
All times are Western Indonesia Time (UTC+07:00)

Date	Time	Event
Saturday, 25 August 2018	14:00	Group A

== Records ==
Prior to this competition, the existing world, Asian and Games records were as follows.

World Record	Snatch	Akakios Kakiasvilis (GRE)	188 kg	Athens, Greece	27 November 1999
World Record	Clean & Jerk	Sohrab Moradi (IRI)	233 kg	Anaheim, United States	3 December 2017
World Record	Total	Sohrab Moradi (IRI)	417 kg	Anaheim, United States	3 December 2017
Asian Record	Snatch	~~Vladimir Sedov (KAZ)~~; Kourosh Bagheri (IRI)	~~188 kg~~ 187 kg	~~Almaty, Kazakhstan~~; Sydney, Australia	~~14 November 2014~~; 24 September 2000
Asian Record	Clean & Jerk	Sohrab Moradi (IRI)	233 kg	Anaheim, United States	3 December 2017
Asian Record	Total	Sohrab Moradi (IRI)	417 kg	Anaheim, United States	3 December 2017
Games Record	Snatch	Bakhyt Akhmetov (KAZ)	185 kg	Busan, South Korea	8 October 2002
Games Record	Clean & Jerk	Ilya Ilyin (KAZ)	226 kg	Doha, Qatar	5 December 2006
Games Record	Total	Bakhyt Akhmetov (KAZ)	400 kg	Busan, South Korea	8 October 2002

- Vladimir Sedov's Asian record was rescinded in 2020.

== Results ==
Legend

- NM — No mark

Rank	Athlete	Group	Snatch (kg)				Clean & Jerk (kg)				Total
Rank	Athlete	Group	1	2	3	Result	1	2	3	Result	Total
1st place, gold medalist(s)	Sohrab Moradi (IRI)	A	182	~~189~~	189	189	221	~~234~~	~~234~~	221	410
2nd place, silver medalist(s)	Fares El-Bakh (QAT)	A	166	~~170~~	~~170~~	166	215	~~222~~	~~222~~	215	381
3rd place, bronze medalist(s)	Sarat Sumpradit (THA)	A	165	170	~~175~~	170	210	~~215~~	~~217~~	210	380
4	Han Jung-hoon (KOR)	A	160	~~165~~	~~165~~	160	207	~~210~~	~~210~~	207	367
5	Bekdoolot Rasulbekov (KGZ)	A	160	165	~~169~~	165	192	198	201	201	366
6	Chen Po-jen (TPE)	A	160	~~165~~	~~166~~	160	185	190	~~198~~	190	350
7	Ali Al-Khazal (KSA)	A	145	~~150~~	150	150	182	190	~~195~~	190	340
8	Vikas Thakur (IND)	A	~~145~~	~~145~~	145	145	190	~~197~~	~~197~~	190	335
9	Mirwais Raziqi (AFG)	A	108	113	~~116~~	113	143	148	155	155	268
—	Kianoush Rostami (IRI)	A	~~175~~	175	~~185~~	175	~~218~~	~~220~~	~~220~~	—	NM

== New records ==
The following records were established during the competition.

Snatch	189	Sohrab Moradi (IRI)	WR
Total	410	Sohrab Moradi (IRI)	GR
