= Weightlifting at the 2014 Asian Games – Women's +75 kg =

Women's +75 kg at the 2014 Asian Games
- Venue: Moonlight Festival Garden Venue
- Date: 26 September 2014
- Competitors: 10 from 8 nations

Medalists
gold medal	Zhou Lulu	China
silver medal	Mariya Grabovetskaya	Kazakhstan
bronze medal	Chitchanok Pulsabsakul	Thailand

The women's +75 kilograms event at the 2014 Asian Games took place on 26 September 2014 at Moonlight Festival Garden Weightlifting Venue in Incheon, South Korea.

== Schedule ==
All times are Korea Standard Time (UTC+09:00)

Date	Time	Event
Friday, 26 September 2014	16:00	Group A

== Records ==
Prior to this competition, the existing world, Asian and Games records were as follows.

World Record	Snatch	Tatiana Kashirina (RUS)	151 kg	London, United Kingdom	5 August 2012
World Record	Clean & Jerk	Tatiana Kashirina (RUS)	190 kg	Wrocław, Poland	26 October 2013
World Record	Total	Tatiana Kashirina (RUS)	334 kg	Moscow, Russia	23 November 2013
Asian Record	Snatch	Zhou Lulu (CHN)	146 kg	Paris, France	13 November 2011
Asian Record	Clean & Jerk	Meng Suping (CHN)	188 kg	Eilat, Israel	9 November 2012
Asian Record	Total	Zhou Lulu (CHN)	333 kg	London, United Kingdom	5 August 2012
Games Record	Snatch	Mu Shuangshuang (CHN)	139 kg	Doha, Qatar	6 December 2006
Games Record	Clean & Jerk	Jang Mi-ran (KOR)	181 kg	Guangzhou, China	19 November 2010
Games Record	Total	Mu Shuangshuang (CHN)	317 kg	Doha, Qatar	6 December 2006

== Results ==
Rank	Athlete	Group	Body weight	Snatch (kg)				Clean & Jerk (kg)				Total
Rank	Athlete	Group	Body weight	1	2	3	Result	1	2	3	Result	Total
1st place, gold medalist(s)	Zhou Lulu (CHN)	A	140.35	135	142	~~147~~	142	175	183	192	192	334
2nd place, silver medalist(s)	Mariya Grabovetskaya (KAZ)	A	117.33	130	136	141	141	150	~~161~~	161	161	302
3rd place, bronze medalist(s)	Chitchanok Pulsabsakul (THA)	A	125.56	125	131	~~135~~	131	157	161	~~172~~	161	292
4	Son Young-hee (KOR)	A	108.02	111	115	120	120	153	~~159~~	162	162	282
5	Praeonapa Khenjantuek (THA)	A	132.42	114	~~120~~	122	122	151	155	160	160	282
6	Lee Hui-sol (KOR)	A	117.50	116	121	124	124	148	~~155~~	155	155	279
7	Mami Shimamoto (JPN)	A	102.81	105	110	113	113	133	138	~~142~~	138	251
8	Nguyễn Thị Kim Vân (VIE)	A	104.53	~~100~~	100	~~106~~	100	130	~~135~~	~~135~~	130	230
9	Tsend-Ayuushiin Ariunjargal (MGL)	A	102.76	66	71	~~74~~	71	88	94	~~100~~	94	165
10	Tara Devi Pun (NEP)	A	77.52	67	~~71~~	~~71~~	67	91	94	~~97~~	94	161

== New records ==
The following records were established during the competition.

Snatch	141	Mariya Grabovetskaya (KAZ)	GR
Snatch	142	Zhou Lulu (CHN)	GR
Clean & Jerk	183	Zhou Lulu (CHN)	GR
Clean & Jerk	192	Zhou Lulu (CHN)	WR
Total	325	Zhou Lulu (CHN)	GR
Total	334	Zhou Lulu (CHN)	AR
