= Weightlifting at the 2022 Asian Games – Men's 61 kg =

Men's 61 kg at the 2022 Asian Games
- Venue: Xiaoshan Sports Center Gymnasium
- Date: 1 October 2023
- Competitors: 15 from 11 nations

Medalists
gold medal	Li Fabin	China
silver medal	Pak Myong-jin	North Korea
bronze medal	Kim Chung-guk	North Korea

The men's 61 kilograms competition at the 2022 Asian Games took place on 1 October 2023 at Xiaoshan Sports Center Gymnasium.

== Schedule ==
All times are China Standard Time (UTC+08:00)

Date	Time	Event
Sunday, 1 October 2023	10:00	Group B
Sunday, 1 October 2023	15:00	Group A

== Records ==
Prior to this competition, the existing world, Asian and Games records were as follows.

World Record	Snatch	Li Fabin (CHN)	145 kg	Pattaya, Thailand	19 September 2019
World Record	Clean & Jerk	Li Fabin (CHN)	175 kg	Bogotá, Colombia	7 December 2022
World Record	Total	Li Fabin (CHN)	318 kg	Pattaya, Thailand	19 September 2019
Asian Record	Snatch	Li Fabin (CHN)	145 kg	Pattaya, Thailand	19 September 2019
Asian Record	Clean & Jerk	Li Fabin (CHN)	175 kg	Bogotá, Colombia	7 December 2022
Asian Record	Total	Li Fabin (CHN)	318 kg	Pattaya, Thailand	19 September 2019
Games Record	Snatch	Asian Games Standard	140 kg	—	1 November 2018
Games Record	Clean & Jerk	Asian Games Standard	172 kg	—	1 November 2018
Games Record	Total	Asian Games Standard	306 kg	—	1 November 2018

== Results ==
Legend

- NM — No mark

Rank	Athlete	Group	Snatch (kg)				Clean & Jerk (kg)				Total
Rank	Athlete	Group	1	2	3	Result	1	2	3	Result	Total
1st place, gold medalist(s)	Li Fabin (CHN)	A	137	141	143	143	167	~~171~~	~~171~~	167	310
2nd place, silver medalist(s)	Pak Myong-jin (PRK)	A	131	~~136~~	136	136	166	171	~~175~~	171	307
3rd place, bronze medalist(s)	Kim Chung-guk (PRK)	A	~~127~~	~~127~~	127	127	~~168~~	168	171	171	298
4	John Ceniza (PHI)	A	128	131	134	134	~~163~~	163	~~167~~	163	297
5	Nguyễn Trần Anh Tuấn (VIE)	A	129	~~132~~	132	132	157	~~161~~	162	162	294
6	Trịnh Văn Vinh (VIE)	A	128	~~131~~	~~132~~	128	164	~~170~~	~~170~~	164	292
7	Ricko Saputra (INA)	A	~~128~~	~~128~~	128	128	160	~~167~~	~~170~~	160	288
8	Seraj Al-Saleem (KSA)	A	124	128	130	130	156	~~162~~	~~162~~	156	286
9	Kao Chan-hung (TPE)	B	118	121	124	124	147	151	~~154~~	151	275
10	Kaito Hirai (JPN)	B	112	117	~~120~~	117	140	145	150	150	267
11	Kyotaro Sano (JPN)	B	116	121	~~126~~	121	~~142~~	142	~~146~~	142	263
12	Dilanka Isuru Kumara (SRI)	B	100	106	~~112~~	106	130	135	~~140~~	135	241
—	Ösökhbayaryn Chagnaadorj (MGL)	B	104	~~108~~	~~110~~	104	~~135~~	~~135~~	~~135~~	—	NM
—	Theerapong Silachai (THA)	A	~~128~~	~~128~~	~~128~~	—	—	—	—	—	NM
—	Ding Hongjie (CHN)	A	~~133~~	~~133~~	~~133~~	—	—	—	—	—	NM

== New records ==
The following records were established during the competition.

Snatch	141	Li Fabin (CHN)	GR
Snatch	143	Li Fabin (CHN)	GR
Total	310	Li Fabin (CHN)	GR
