= Weightlifting at the 2014 Asian Games – Men's 77 kg =

Men's 77 kg at the 2014 Asian Games
- Venue: Moonlight Festival Garden Venue
- Date: 23 September 2014
- Competitors: 13 from 11 nations

Medalists
gold medal	Lü Xiaojun	China
silver medal	Kim Kwang-song	North Korea
bronze medal	Chatuphum Chinnawong	Thailand

The men's 77 kilograms event at the 2014 Asian Games took place on 23 September 2014 at Moonlight Festival Garden Weightlifting Venue.

== Schedule ==
All times are Korea Standard Time (UTC+09:00)

Date	Time	Event
Tuesday, 23 September 2014	14:00	Group B
Tuesday, 23 September 2014	19:00	Group A

== Records ==
Prior to this competition, the existing world, Asian and Games records were as follows.

World Record	Snatch	Lü Xiaojun (CHN)	176 kg	Wrocław, Poland	24 October 2013
World Record	Clean & Jerk	Oleg Perepetchenov (RUS)	210 kg	Trenčín, Slovakia	27 April 2001
World Record	Total	Lü Xiaojun (CHN)	380 kg	Wrocław, Poland	24 October 2013
Asian Record	Snatch	Lü Xiaojun (CHN)	176 kg	Wrocław, Poland	24 October 2013
Asian Record	Clean & Jerk	Mohammad Ali Falahatinejad (IRI)	208 kg	Qinhuangdao, China	12 September 2003
Asian Record	Total	Lü Xiaojun (CHN)	380 kg	Wrocław, Poland	24 October 2013
Games Record	Snatch	Sergey Filimonov (KAZ)	173 kg	Busan, South Korea	4 October 2002
Games Record	Clean & Jerk	Mohammad Hossein Barkhah (IRI)	202 kg	Busan, South Korea	4 October 2002
Games Record	Total	Sergey Filimonov (KAZ)	375 kg	Busan, South Korea	4 October 2002

== Results ==
Rank	Athlete	Group	Body weight	Snatch (kg)				Clean & Jerk (kg)				Total
Rank	Athlete	Group	Body weight	1	2	3	Result	1	2	3	Result	Total
1st place, gold medalist(s)	Lü Xiaojun (CHN)	A	76.68	165	170	175	175	~~200~~	~~200~~	200	200	375
2nd place, silver medalist(s)	Kim Kwang-song (PRK)	A	76.02	160	165	168	168	190	195	~~207~~	195	363
3rd place, bronze medalist(s)	Chatuphum Chinnawong (THA)	A	76.70	155	160	163	163	186	190	~~196~~	190	353
4	Rejepbaý Rejepow (TKM)	A	76.79	155	160	~~163~~	160	185	~~190~~	~~194~~	185	345
5	Vyacheslav Yershov (KAZ)	A	76.95	155	160	~~165~~	160	170	176	~~186~~	176	336
6	Pornchai Lobsi (THA)	A	75.90	145	150	~~153~~	150	171	176	~~185~~	176	326
7	Daýanç Aşyrow (TKM)	A	76.49	~~150~~	150	~~155~~	150	170	175	~~180~~	175	325
8	Triyatno (INA)	A	75.25	140	145	~~150~~	145	176	~~181~~	~~181~~	176	321
9	Ahmed Farooq (IRQ)	B	74.28	133	137	140	140	170	173	178	178	318
10	Ravi Kumar Katulu (IND)	B	76.44	~~137~~	137	141	141	167	172	~~178~~	172	313
11	Nouraldin Dawoud (PLE)	B	76.50	115	~~120~~	~~121~~	115	141	146	~~150~~	146	261
12	Esmatullah Rustamkhil (AFG)	B	75.38	95	100	~~105~~	100	130	~~135~~	~~135~~	130	230
13	Essa Al-Buainain (QAT)	B	76.11	55	60	—	60	75	80	—	80	140

== New records ==
The following records were established during the competition.

Snatch	175	Lü Xiaojun (CHN)	GR
