= Weightlifting at the 2006 Asian Games – Women's 58 kg =

2006 Asian Games event

Women's 58 kg at the 2006 Asian Games
- Venue: Al-Dana Banquet Hall
- Date: 3 December 2006
- Competitors: 9 from 9 nations

Medalists
gold medal	Chen Yanqing	China
silver medal	Wandee Kameaim	Thailand
bronze medal	Pak Hyon-suk	North Korea

The women's 58 kilograms event at the 2006 Asian Games took place on December 3, 2006 at Al-Dana Banquet Hall in Doha.

== Schedule ==
All times are Arabia Standard Time (UTC+03:00)

Date	Time	Event
Sunday, 3 December 2006	13:00	Group A

== Records ==
Prior to this competition, the existing world, Asian and Games records were as follows.

World Record	Snatch	Wang Li (CHN)	110 kg	Bali, Indonesia	10 August 2003
World Record	Clean & Jerk	Gu Wei (CHN)	139 kg	Doha, Qatar	10 November 2005
World Record	Total	Gu Wei (CHN)	241 kg	Doha, Qatar	10 November 2005
Asian Record	Snatch	Wang Li (CHN)	110 kg	Bali, Indonesia	10 August 2003
Asian Record	Clean & Jerk	Gu Wei (CHN)	139 kg	Doha, Qatar	10 November 2005
Asian Record	Total	Gu Wei (CHN)	241 kg	Doha, Qatar	10 November 2005
Games Record	Snatch	Chen Yanqing (CHN)	98 kg	Bangkok, Thailand	9 December 1998
Games Record	Clean & Jerk	Ri Song-hui (PRK)	125 kg	Bangkok, Thailand	9 December 1998
Games Record	Total	Chen Yanqing (CHN)	220 kg	Bangkok, Thailand	9 December 1998

== Results ==
Legend

- NM — No mark

Rank	Athlete	Group	Body weight	Snatch (kg)				Clean & Jerk (kg)				Total
Rank	Athlete	Group	Body weight	1	2	3	Result	1	2	3	Result	Total
1st place, gold medalist(s)	Chen Yanqing (CHN)	A	57.76	103	108	111	111	131	137	140	140	251
2nd place, silver medalist(s)	Wandee Kameaim (THA)	A	57.51	93	~~98~~	98	98	~~126~~	~~126~~	126	126	224
3rd place, bronze medalist(s)	Pak Hyon-suk (PRK)	A	57.84	~~97~~	97	~~101~~	97	127	~~129~~	~~129~~	127	224
4	Yoon Jin-hee (KOR)	A	57.00	90	93	~~95~~	93	110	~~115~~	115	115	208
5	Namkhaidorjiin Bayarmaa (MGL)	A	57.97	~~86~~	~~86~~	86	86	~~111~~	111	~~116~~	111	197
6	Kamilya Bagautdinova (KAZ)	A	57.77	75	80	~~82~~	80	95	100	105	105	185
7	Elena Sisoeva (UZB)	A	57.94	75	80	~~82~~	80	90	~~95~~	95	95	175
8	Dương Thị Bích Tuyền (VIE)	A	55.82	77	~~82~~	~~82~~	77	95	~~100~~	~~100~~	95	172
—	Shwe Sin Win (MYA)	A	57.66	93	~~95~~	95	95	~~120~~	~~120~~	~~120~~	—	NM

== New records ==
The following records were established during the competition.

Snatch	103	Chen Yanqing (CHN)	GR
Snatch	108	Chen Yanqing (CHN)	GR
Snatch	111	Chen Yanqing (CHN)	WR
Clean & Jerk	126	Wandee Kameaim (THA)	GR
Clean & Jerk	127	Pak Hyon-suk (PRK)	GR
Clean & Jerk	131	Chen Yanqing (CHN)	GR
Clean & Jerk	137	Chen Yanqing (CHN)	GR
Clean & Jerk	140	Chen Yanqing (CHN)	WR
Total	224	Wandee Kameaim (THA)	GR
Total	242	Chen Yanqing (CHN)	WR
Total	248	Chen Yanqing (CHN)	WR
Total	251	Chen Yanqing (CHN)	WR
