= 2018 World Weightlifting Championships – Men's 96 kg =

The men's 96 kilograms competition at the 2018 World Weightlifting Championships was held on 7 November 2018.

== Schedule ==
Date	Time	Event
7 November 2018	10:00	Group C
7 November 2018	12:00	Group B
7 November 2018	17:25	Group A

== Medalists ==
Event	Gold		Silver		Bronze	
Snatch	Sohrab Moradi (IRI)	186 kg	Tian Tao (CHN)	181 kg	Yauheni Tsikhantsou (BLR)	180 kg
Clean & Jerk	Sohrab Moradi (IRI)	230 kg	Tian Tao (CHN)	226 kg	Fares El-Bakh (QAT)	217 kg
Total	Sohrab Moradi (IRI)	416 kg	Tian Tao (CHN)	407 kg	Nicolae Onică (ROU)	391 kg

== Records ==
Prior to this competition, the existing world records were as follows.

World Record	Snatch	World Standard	185 kg	—	1 November 2018
World Record	Clean & Jerk	World Standard	225 kg	—	1 November 2018
World Record	Total	World Standard	401 kg	—	1 November 2018

== Results ==
Rank	Athlete	Group	Snatch (kg)				Clean & Jerk (kg)				Total
Rank	Athlete	Group	1	2	3	Rank	1	2	3	Rank	Total
1st place, gold medalist(s)	Sohrab Moradi (IRI)	A	181	~~186~~	186 WR	1st place, gold medalist(s)	223	230 WR	~~237~~	1st place, gold medalist(s)	416 WR
2nd place, silver medalist(s)	Tian Tao (CHN)	A	175	~~181~~	181	2nd place, silver medalist(s)	215	226 WR	~~236~~	2nd place, silver medalist(s)	407
3rd place, bronze medalist(s)	Nicolae Onică (ROU)	A	170	175	~~182~~	5	216	~~222~~	~~227~~	4	391
4	Yauheni Tsikhantsou (BLR)	A	173 JWR	180 CJWR	~~184~~	3rd place, bronze medalist(s)	210 JWR	~~217~~	~~217~~	7	390 JWR
5	Fares El-Bakh (QAT)	A	171	~~174~~	~~174~~	9	~~217~~	217 JWR	~~222~~	3rd place, bronze medalist(s)	388
6	Sarat Sumpradit (THA)	A	165	170	173	8	200	206	211	5	384
7	Boady Santavy (CAN)	A	171	175	~~178~~	6	203	208	~~212~~	9	383
8	Anton Pliesnoi (GEO)	A	167	173	~~177~~	7	198	206	~~211~~	11	379
9	Egor Klimonov (RUS)	A	162	167	168	13	205	210	~~214~~	8	378
10	Jhonatan Rivas (COL)	A	171	176 JWR	~~180~~	4	~~201~~	~~201~~	201	14	377 JWR
11	Rustem Sybay (KAZ)	A	~~165~~	165	~~170~~	15	~~205~~	206	211	6	376
12	Amir Hoghoughi (IRI)	A	161	167	~~171~~	14	201	207	~~213~~	10	374
13	Serafim Veli (BRA)	B	160	166	170	10	194	200	~~202~~	16	370
14	Volodymyr Hoza (UKR)	B	163	167	170	11	193	~~198~~	~~201~~	22	363
15	Chen Po-jen (TPE)	B	160	165	168	12	190	195	~~198~~	20	363
16	İbrahim Arat (TUR)	B	155	160	~~163~~	16	196	~~201~~	201	12	361
17	Jeyson Arias (VEN)	B	~~156~~	~~156~~	156	22	196	~~201~~	201	13	357
18	Han Jung-hoon (KOR)	B	156	~~160~~	~~160~~	21	200	~~207~~	~~207~~	15	356
19	Paul Ferrín (ECU)	B	155	160	~~162~~	17	195	~~201~~	~~201~~	19	355
20	Jason Bonnick (USA)	B	152	157	~~161~~	19	185	191	196	18	353
21	Vadims Koževņikovs (LAT)	B	149	~~153~~	153	28	195	199	~~202~~	17	352
22	Jürgen Spieß (GER)	C	155	~~160~~	~~163~~	23	187	194	~~200~~	21	349
23	Illia Kulikov (UKR)	C	152	~~156~~	156	20	185	192	~~197~~	23	348
24	Nathan Damron (USA)	B	155	~~160~~	~~160~~	25	~~187~~	188	~~195~~	26	343
25	Theodoros Iakovidis (GRE)	C	153	~~158~~	~~158~~	27	~~183~~	183	188	25	341
26	Tomas Li-čin-chai (LTU)	C	145	151	154	26	175	183	~~186~~	29	337
27	Eero Retulainen (FIN)	C	~~148~~	~~148~~	149	31	~~187~~	188	~~193~~	24	337
28	Christian Amoah (GHA)	C	145	~~150~~	150	30	175	180	185	28	335
29	Edmon Avetisyan (GBR)	C	138	~~143~~	144	33	177	182	187	27	331
30	Pierre-Alexandre Bessette (CAN)	C	150	155	~~159~~	24	175	~~181~~	~~182~~	30	330
31	Luis Lamenza (PUR)	C	~~150~~	150	~~157~~	29	175	~~185~~	~~185~~	31	325
32	Simon Darville (DEN)	C	133	138	144	32	167	~~175~~	175	32	319
33	Laurynas Antanaitis (LTU)	C	~~136~~	136	140	34	162	168	171	33	311
34	Keven Morales (PUR)	C	~~135~~	~~135~~	135	35	165	170	~~175~~	34	305
—	Artur Mugurdumov (ISR)	B	155	~~159~~	160	18	~~195~~	~~196~~	~~196~~	—	—

== New records ==
Snatch	186 kg	Sohrab Moradi (IRI)	WR
Clean & Jerk	226 kg	Tian Tao (CHN)	WR
Clean & Jerk	230 kg	Sohrab Moradi (IRI)	WR
Total	407 kg	Sohrab Moradi (IRI)	WR
Total	416 kg	Sohrab Moradi (IRI)	WR
