= Weightlifting at the 2012 Summer Olympics – Women's +75 kg =

Women's +75 kg at the Games of the XXX Olympiad
- Venue: ExCeL London
- Date: 5 August 2012
- Competitors: 14 from 13 nations

Medalists
1st place, gold medalist(s)		Zhou Lulu	China
2nd place, silver medalist(s)		Tatiana Kashirina	Russia
3rd place, bronze medalist(s)		Jang Mi-ran	South Korea

The Women's +75 kg weightlifting event at the 2012 Summer Olympics in London, United Kingdom, took place at ExCeL London.

== Summary ==
Total score was the sum of the lifter's best result in each of the snatch and the clean and jerk, with three lifts allowed for each lift. In case of a tie, the lighter lifter won; if still tied, the lifter who took the fewest attempts to achieve the total score won. Lifters without a valid snatch score did not perform the clean and jerk.

Russia's Tatiana Kashirina set a world record in the snatch with a lift of 151kg, becoming the first woman to snatch 150kg, while China's Zhou Lulu set a world record in the total with 333kg, as well as an Olympic record in the clean and jerk with a lift of 187kg.

Ukraine's Svitlana Cherniavska was on the start list but did not compete.

== Schedule ==
All times are British Summer Time (UTC+01:00)

Date	Time	Event
5 August 2012	15:30	Group A

== Records ==
Prior to this competition, the existing world and Olympic records were as follows.

World record	Snatch	Tatiana Kashirina (RUS)	148 kg	Belgorod, Russia	18 December 2011
World record	Clean & Jerk	Jang Mi-ran (KOR)	187 kg	Goyang, South Korea	28 November 2009
World record	Total	Zhou Lulu (CHN)	328 kg	Paris, France	13 November 2011
Olympic record	Snatch	Jang Mi-ran (KOR)	140 kg	Beijing, China	16 August 2008
Olympic record	Clean & Jerk	Jang Mi-ran (KOR)	186 kg	Beijing, China	16 August 2008
Olympic record	Total	Jang Mi-ran (KOR)	326 kg	Beijing, China	16 August 2008

== Results ==
Rank	Athlete	Group	Body weight	Snatch (kg)				Clean & Jerk (kg)				Total
Rank	Athlete	Group	Body weight	1	2	3	Result	1	2	3	Result	Total
1st place, gold medalist(s)	Zhou Lulu (CHN)	A	130.83	142	~~146~~	146	146	181	187	~~190~~	187	333
2nd place, silver medalist(s)	Tatiana Kashirina (RUS)	A	102.31	144	149	151	151	175	181	~~187~~	181	332
3rd place, bronze medalist(s)	Jang Mi-ran (KOR)	A	118.07	120	125	~~129~~	125	158	164	~~170~~	164	289
4	Nahla Ramadan (EGY)	A	105.51	122	~~125~~	~~125~~	122	150	155	~~158~~	155	277
5	Ele Opeloge (SAM)	A	124.89	117	~~122~~	~~122~~	117	145	150	~~155~~	150	267
6	Sarah Robles (USA)	A	124.35	114	~~118~~	120	120	~~144~~	~~145~~	145	145	265
7	Oliba Nieve (ECU)	A	97.43	113	117	~~120~~	117	~~138~~	138	~~142~~	138	255
8	Mami Shimamoto (JPN)	A	105.90	103	107	110	110	138	143	~~146~~	143	253
9	Holley Mangold (USA)	A	157.04	~~105~~	105	~~110~~	105	135	~~140~~	~~140~~	135	240
10	Astrid Camposeco (GUA)	A	88.52	87	91	93	93	112	115	~~117~~	115	208
11	Luisa Peters (COK)	A	88.58	74	78	82	82	95	100	~~105~~	100	182
12	Alberta Ampomah (GHA)	A	78.53	~~70~~	70	73	73	~~97~~	97	101	101	174
—	Mariam Usman (NGR)	A	120.79	125	129	~~133~~	129	~~160~~	~~160~~	~~160~~	—	—
DQ	Hripsime Khurshudyan (ARM)	A	87.58	124	128	~~132~~	128	158	~~166~~	166	166	294

== New records ==
Snatch	142 kg	Zhou Lulu (CHN)	OR
Snatch	144 kg	Tatiana Kashirina (RUS)	OR
Snatch	146 kg	Zhou Lulu (CHN)	OR
Snatch	149 kg	Tatiana Kashirina (RUS)	WR
Snatch	151 kg	Tatiana Kashirina (RUS)	WR
Clean & Jerk	187 kg	Zhou Lulu (CHN)	OR
Total	327 kg	Zhou Lulu (CHN)	OR
Total	332 kg	Tatiana Kashirina (RUS)	WR
Total	333 kg	Zhou Lulu (CHN)	WR
