= Weightlifting at the 2022 Asian Games – Women's 59 kg =

Women's 59 kg at the 2022 Asian Games
- Venue: Xiaoshan Sports Center Gymnasium
- Date: 2 October 2023
- Competitors: 11 from 9 nations

Medalists
gold medal	Kim Il-gyong	North Korea
silver medal	Luo Shifang	China
bronze medal	Kuo Hsing-chun	Chinese Taipei

The women's 59 kilograms competition at the 2022 Asian Games took place on 2 October 2023 at Xiaoshan Sports Center Gymnasium.

== Schedule ==
All times are China Standard Time (UTC+08:00)

Date	Time	Event
Monday, 2 October 2023	10:00	Group B
Monday, 2 October 2023	15:00	Group A

== Records ==
Prior to this competition, the existing world, Asian and Games records were as follows.

World Record	Snatch	Kuo Hsing-chun (TPE)	110 kg	Tashkent, Uzbekistan	19 April 2021
World Record	Clean & Jerk	Kuo Hsing-chun (TPE)	140 kg	Pattaya, Thailand	21 September 2019
World Record	Total	Kuo Hsing-chun (TPE)	247 kg	Tashkent, Uzbekistan	19 April 2021
Asian Record	Snatch	Kuo Hsing-chun (TPE)	110 kg	Tashkent, Uzbekistan	19 April 2021
Asian Record	Clean & Jerk	Kuo Hsing-chun (TPE)	140 kg	Pattaya, Thailand	21 September 2019
Asian Record	Total	Kuo Hsing-chun (TPE)	247 kg	Tashkent, Uzbekistan	19 April 2021
Games Record	Snatch	Asian Games Standard	102 kg	—	1 November 2018
Games Record	Clean & Jerk	Asian Games Standard	128 kg	—	1 November 2018
Games Record	Total	Asian Games Standard	229 kg	—	1 November 2018

== Results ==
Legend

- NM — No mark

Rank	Athlete	Group	Snatch (kg)				Clean & Jerk (kg)				Total
Rank	Athlete	Group	1	2	3	Result	1	2	3	Result	Total
1st place, gold medalist(s)	Kim Il-gyong (PRK)	A	103	107	111	111	127	132	135	135	246
2nd place, silver medalist(s)	Luo Shifang (CHN)	A	100	104	107	107	128	133	~~140~~	133	240
3rd place, bronze medalist(s)	Kuo Hsing-chun (TPE)	A	97	99	101	101	122	126	~~128~~	126	227
4	Hidilyn Diaz (PHI)	A	94	97	~~100~~	97	121	126	~~131~~	126	223
5	Thanaporn Saetia (THA)	A	95	97	~~99~~	97	~~110~~	111	113	113	210
6	Natasya Beteyob (INA)	B	~~91~~	91	~~96~~	91	~~117~~	~~117~~	117	117	208
7	Quàng Thị Tâm (VIE)	A	92	~~95~~	~~95~~	92	108	111	~~113~~	111	203
8	Darya Balabayuk (KAZ)	B	75	79	~~82~~	79	95	98	100	100	179
9	Altynay Tanibergenova (KAZ)	B	73	76	~~79~~	76	93	97	~~102~~	97	173
—	Hoàng Thị Duyên (VIE)	A	~~93~~	~~93~~	~~93~~	—	—	—	—	—	NM
—	Enkhbaataryn Enkhtamir (MGL)	A	~~92~~	~~92~~	~~95~~	—	—	—	—	—	NM

== New records ==
The following records were established during the competition.

Snatch	103	Kim Il-gyong (PRK)	GR
Snatch	104	Luo Shifang (CHN)	GR
Snatch	107	Kim Il-gyong (PRK)	GR
Snatch	111	Kim Il-gyong (PRK)	WR
Clean & Jerk	132	Kim Il-gyong (PRK)	GR
Clean & Jerk	133	Luo Shifang (CHN)	GR
Clean & Jerk	135	Kim Il-gyong (PRK)	GR
Total	238	Kim Il-gyong (PRK)	GR
Total	243	Kim Il-gyong (PRK)	GR
Total	246	Kim Il-gyong (PRK)	GR
