= Weightlifting at the 2026 Asian Games – Men's 65 kg =

Men's 65 kg at the 2026 Asian Games
- Venue: Nagoya Trade & Industry Center
- Date: 24 September 2026
- Competitors: 11 from 11 nations

Medalists
gold medal	Pak Myong-jin	North Korea
silver medal	He Yueji	China
bronze medal	Trần Minh Trí	Vietnam

The men's 65 kilograms competition at the 2026 Asian Games was held on 24 September 2026 at the Nagoya Trade & Industry Center.

== Schedule ==
All times are Japan Standard Time (UTC+09:00)

Date	Time	Event
Thursday, 24 September 2026	10:00	Group B
Thursday, 24 September 2026	17:00	Group A

== Records ==
Prior to this competition, the existing world, Asian and Games records were as follows.

World Record	Snatch	World Standard	148 kg	—	1 June 2025
World Record	Clean & Jerk	He Yueji (CHN)	183 kg	Gandhinagar, India	13 May 2026
World Record	Total	He Yueji (CHN)	329 kg	Gandhinagar, India	13 May 2026
Asian Record	Snatch	Asian Standard	148 kg	—	1 June 2025
Asian Record	Clean & Jerk	He Yueji (CHN)	183 kg	Gandhinagar, India	13 May 2026
Asian Record	Total	He Yueji (CHN)	329 kg	Gandhinagar, India	13 May 2026
Games Record	Snatch	Asian Games Standard	145 kg	—	1 August 2026
Games Record	Clean & Jerk	Asian Games Standard	176 kg	—	1 August 2026
Games Record	Total	Asian Games Standard	317 kg	—	1 August 2026

== Results ==
Legend

- NM — No mark

Rank	Athlete	Group	Snatch (kg)				Clean & Jerk (kg)				Total
Rank	Athlete	Group	1	2	3	Result	1	2	3	Result	Total
1st place, gold medalist(s)	Pak Myong-jin (PRK)	A	140	144	146	146	~~178~~	178	182	182	328
2nd place, silver medalist(s)	He Yueji (CHN)	A	145	149	152	152	175	~~179~~	~~180~~	175	327
3rd place, bronze medalist(s)	Trần Minh Trí (VIE)	A	136	139	~~141~~	139	167	170	~~173~~	170	309
4	Eko Yuli Irawan (INA)	A	~~135~~	135	~~138~~	135	~~167~~	167	~~175~~	167	302
5	Seraj Al-Saleem (KSA)	A	~~131~~	131	~~135~~	131	~~167~~	167	~~173~~	167	298
6	Tatsuma Yamashita (JPN)	A	125	130	~~132~~	130	~~155~~	155	~~160~~	155	285
7	Dastan Imanaliev (KGZ)	B	115	120	~~125~~	120	140	~~145~~	~~145~~	140	260
8	Ösökhbayaryn Chagnaadorj (MGL)	B	105	108	~~111~~	108	130	~~138~~	~~141~~	130	238
—	Sairamkez Akmolda (KAZ)	A	130	~~135~~	~~135~~	130	~~173~~	~~174~~	~~180~~	—	NM
—	Patsaphong Thongsuk (THA)	A	~~130~~	~~130~~	~~130~~	—	—	—	—	—	NM
—	Sandu Jayawardhana (SRI)	B	~~120~~	~~120~~	~~120~~	—	—	—	—	—	NM

== New records ==
The following records were established during the competition.

Snatch	146	Pak Myong-jin (PRK)	GR
Snatch	149	He Yueji (CHN)	WR
Snatch	152	He Yueji (CHN)	WR
Clean & Jerk	178	Pak Myong-jin (PRK)	GR
Clean & Jerk	182	Pak Myong-jin (PRK)	GR
Total	327	He Yueji (CHN)	GR
Total	328	Pak Myong-jin (PRK)	GR
