= Sarat Sumpradit =

Thai weightlifter (born 1994)

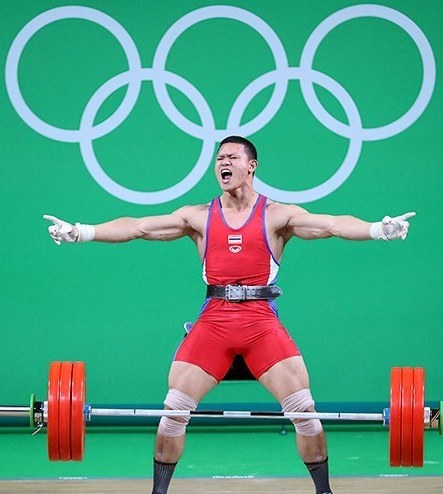
- Sumpradit at the 2016 Olympics

Personal information
- Nationality: Thai
- Born: 17 April 1994 (age 32) Nakhon Sawan, Thailand
- Height: 181 cm (5 ft 11 in)
- Weight: 93 kg (205 lb)

Sport
- Sport: Weightlifting
Medal record
Representing Thailand
Asian Games
Bronze medal – third place	2018 Jakarta	-94 kg
Bronze medal – third place	2022 Hangzhou	-96 kg
Asian Championships
Bronze medal – third place	2023 Jinju	–96 kg
SEA Games
Gold medal – first place	2013 Naypyidaw	-94 kg
Gold medal – first place	2025 Bangkok	-94 kg

Sarat Sumpradit (Thai: ศรัท สุ่มประดิษฐ; born 17 April 1994) is a Thai weightlifter who competes in the 94 kg division. He won a gold medal at the 2013 Southeast Asian Games and placed fourth at the 2014 Asian Games and 2016 Olympics.

== International competition results ==
Year	Competition	Venue	Weight class	Snatch (kg)	Clean & Jerk (kg)	Total (kg)	Rank	Notes
2013	Southeast Asian Games	Myanmar	94 kg	—			Gold	First SEA Games gold medal
2014	Asian Games	South Korea	94 kg	—			4	
2016	Olympic Games	Brazil	94 kg	177	213	390	4	Best Olympic performance
2017	Summer Universiade	Taiwan	94 kg	—			Bronze	
2018	Asian Games	Indonesia	94 kg	—			Bronze	
2023	World Championships	Saudi Arabia	96 kg	170	—	—	—	Lifted only one snatch to conserve energy for Asian Games
2023	Asian Games	China	96 kg	—			Bronze	Bronze medal in men's 96 kg category
2025	Southeast Asian Games	Thailand	94 kg	—			Gold	Second SEA Games gold medal after 12 years
