= Weightlifting at the 2026 Asian Games – Men's 75 kg =

Men's 75 kg at the 2026 Asian Games
- Venue: Nagoya Trade & Industry Center
- Date: 26 September 2026
- Competitors: 9 from 9 nations

Medalists
| gold medal | Rahmat Erwin Abdullah | Indonesia |
| silver medal | Weeraphon Wichuma | Thailand |
| bronze medal | Ri Chong-song | North Korea |

The men's 75 kilograms competition at the 2026 Asian Games was held on 26 September 2026 at the Nagoya Trade & Industry Center.

== Schedule ==
All times are Japan Standard Time (UTC+09:00)

| Date | Time | Event |
|---|---|---|
| Saturday, 26 September 2026 | 17:00 | Group A |

== Records ==
Prior to this competition, the existing world, Asian and Games records were as follows.

| World Record | Snatch | World Standard | 159 kg | — | 1 August 2026 |
| World Record | Clean & Jerk | World Standard | 195 kg | — | 1 August 2026 |
| World Record | Total | World Standard | 349 kg | — | 1 August 2026 |
| Asian Record | Snatch | Asian Standard | 158 kg | — | 1 August 2026 |
| Asian Record | Clean & Jerk | Asian Standard | 195 kg | — | 1 August 2026 |
| Asian Record | Total | Asian Standard | 347 kg | — | 1 August 2026 |
| Games Record | Snatch | Asian Games Standard | 157 kg | — | 1 August 2026 |
| Games Record | Clean & Jerk | Asian Games Standard | 190 kg | — | 1 August 2026 |
| Games Record | Total | Asian Games Standard | 342 kg | — | 1 August 2026 |

== Results ==
Legend

- NM — No mark

| Rank | Athlete | Group | Snatch (kg) | | | | Clean & Jerk (kg) | | | | Total |
| Rank | Athlete | Group | 1 | 2 | 3 | Result | 1 | 2 | 3 | Result | Total |
|---|---|---|---|---|---|---|---|---|---|---|---|
| 1st place, gold medalist(s) | Rahmat Erwin Abdullah (INA) | A | 155 | 158 | 160 | 160 | 201 | 206 | — | 206 | 366 |
| 2nd place, silver medalist(s) | Weeraphon Wichuma (THA) | A | 155 | 158 | 160 | 160 | ~~200~~ | 200 | 205 | 205 | 365 |
| 3rd place, bronze medalist(s) | Ri Chong-song (PRK) | A | 158 | ~~162~~ | 162 | 162 | 195 | ~~202~~ | ~~202~~ | 195 | 357 |
| 4 | Chiang Tsung-han (TPE) | A | 150 | 155 | ~~158~~ | 155 | ~~182~~ | 182 | ~~185~~ | 182 | 337 |
| 5 | Bektimur Reýimow (TKM) | A | 148 | 152 | 155 | 155 | ~~177~~ | 177 | 182 | 182 | 337 |
| 6 | Diyorbek Ruzmetov (UZB) | A | 149 | 153 | 156 | 156 | 180 | ~~183~~ | ~~183~~ | 180 | 336 |
| 7 | Beksultan Aitbay (KAZ) | A | 132 | ~~135~~ | 135 | 135 | 173 | ~~177~~ | 177 | 177 | 312 |
| 8 | Ichinkhorloogiin Amarsanaa (MGL) | A | 111 | 116 | 120 | 120 | 127 | 131 | ~~135~~ | 131 | 251 |
| — | Son Hyeon-ho (KOR) | A | ~~149~~ | ~~149~~ | ~~149~~ | — | — | — | — | — | NM |

== New records ==
The following records were established during the competition.

| Snatch | 158 | Ri Chong-song (PRK) | GR |
| Snatch | 160 | Weeraphon Wichuma (THA) | WR |
| Snatch | 162 | Ri Chong-song (PRK) | WR |
| Clean & Jerk | 195 | Ri Chong-song (PRK) | GR |
| Clean & Jerk | 200 | Weeraphon Wichuma (THA) | WR |
| Clean & Jerk | 201 | Rahmat Erwin Abdullah (INA) | WR |
| Clean & Jerk | 205 | Weeraphon Wichuma (THA) | WR |
| Clean & Jerk | 206 | Rahmat Erwin Abdullah (INA) | WR |
| Total | 357 | Ri Chong-song (PRK) | WR |
| Total | 360 | Weeraphon Wichuma (THA) | WR |
| Total | 361 | Rahmat Erwin Abdullah (INA) | WR |
| Total | 365 | Weeraphon Wichuma (THA) | WR |
| Total | 366 | Rahmat Erwin Abdullah (INA) | WR |
