= Zhou Lulu =

Chinese weightlifter (born 1988)

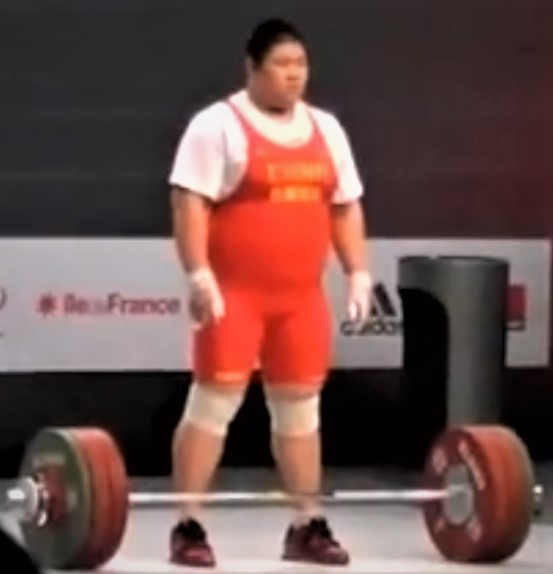
- Zhou at 2011 world weightlifting championships

Personal information
- Nationality: Chinese
- Born: March 19, 1988 (age 38) Yantai, Shandong, China
- Height: 1.75 m (5 ft 9 in)
- Weight: 140 kg (309 lb)

Sport
- Country: China
- Sport: Weightlifting
- Event: +75kg
- Coached by: Yang Zhijun

Achievements and titles
- Olympic finals: 2012 London: +75 kg – Gold
- World finals: 2011 Paris: +75 kg – Gold
- Personal bests: Snatch: 146 kg (2011); Clean and jerk: 192 kg (2014); Total: 334 kg (2014)
Medal record
Olympic Games
Gold medal – first place	2012 London	+75 kg
World Championships
Gold medal – first place	2011 Paris	+75 kg
Silver medal – second place	2013 Wrocław	+75 kg
Asian Games
Gold medal – first place	2014 Incheon	+75 kg
Asian Championships
Silver medal – second place	2011 Tongling	+75 kg
National Games of China
Silver medal – second place	2009 Shandong	+75 kg
Gold medal – first place	2013 Liaoning	+75 kg

Zhou Lulu (Chinese: 周璐璐; born March 19, 1988) is a Chinese weightlifter.

== Career ==
On November 13, 2011, she won the gold medal in the women's super heavyweight category and set an aggregate world record of 328 kg in the snatch and clean and jerk in the world weightlifting championships in Paris, France.

She won the gold medal at the 2012 Summer Olympics in the women's +75 kg category with a total of 333 kg, a new world record.
