= List of Asian records in Olympic weightlifting =

This is a list of Asian records in Olympic weightlifting. These records are maintained in each weight class for the snatch lift, clean and jerk lift, and the total for both lifts by the Asian Weightlifting Federation (AWF).

== Current records ==
=== Men ===
Event	Record	Athlete	Nation	Date	Meet	Place	Ref
60 kg
Snatch	141 kg	Asian Standard					
Clean & Jerk	174 kg	Pang Un-chol	North Korea	11 May 2026	Asian Championships	Gandhinagar, India	
Total	307 kg	Asian Standard					
65 kg
Snatch	152 kg	He Yueji	China	24 September 2026	Asian Games	Nagoya, Japan	
Clean & Jerk	187 kg	Pak Myong-jin	North Korea	28 October 2026	World Championships	Ningbo, China	
Total	331 kg	Pak Myong-jin	North Korea	28 October 2026	World Championships	Ningbo, China	
70 kg
Snatch	157 kg	Pak Pyol	North Korea	30 October 2026	World Championships	Ningbo, China	
Clean & Jerk	198 kg	Ri Won-ju	North Korea	26 September 2026	Asian Games	Nagoya, Japan	
Total	355 kg	Pak Pyol	North Korea	30 October 2026	World Championships	Ningbo, China	
75 kg
Snatch	162 kg	Ri Chong-song	North Korea	26 September 2026	Asian Games	Nagoya, Japan	
Clean & Jerk	206 kg	Rahmat Erwin Abdullah	Indonesia	26 September 2026	Asian Games	Nagoya, Japan	
Total	366 kg	Rahmat Erwin Abdullah	Indonesia	26 September 2026	Asian Games	Nagoya, Japan	
85 kg
Snatch	173 kg	Alexey Churkin	Kazakhstan	28 September 2026	Asian Games	Nagoya, Japan	
Clean & Jerk	215 kg	Ro Kwang-ryol	North Korea	2 November 2026	World Championships	Ningbo, China	
Total	382 kg	Lei Jiangqing	China	2 November 2026	World Championships	Ningbo, China	
95 kg
Snatch	182 kg	Nurgissa Adiletuly	Kazakhstan	4 November 2026	World Championships	Ningbo, China	
Clean & Jerk	220 kg	Asian Standard					
Total	399 kg	Nurgissa Adiletuly	Kazakhstan	4 November 2026	World Championships	Ningbo, China	
110 kg
Snatch	198 kg	Akbar Djuraev	Uzbekistan	6 November 2026	World Championships	Ningbo, China	
Clean & Jerk	237 kg	Asian Standard					
Total	432 kg	Akbar Djuraev	Uzbekistan	6 November 2026	World Championships	Ningbo, China	
+110 kg
Snatch	219 kg	Ali Ammar	Iraq	29 September 2026	Asian Games	Nagoya, Japan	
Clean & Jerk	263 kg	Alireza Yousefi	Iran	8 November 2026	World Championships	Ningbo, China	
Total	466 kg	Ali Davoudi	Iran	29 September 2026	Asian Games	Nagoya, Japan	

=== Women ===
Event	Record	Athlete	Nation	Date	Meet	Place	Ref
49 kg
Snatch	94 kg	Ri Song-gum	North Korea	23 September 2026	Asian Games	Nagoya, Japan	
Clean & Jerk	121 kg	Ri Song-gum	North Korea	23 September 2026	Asian Games	Nagoya, Japan	
Total	215 kg	Ri Song-gum	North Korea	23 September 2026	Asian Games	Nagoya, Japan	
53 kg
Snatch	99 kg	Asian Standard					
Clean & Jerk	126 kg	Asian Standard					
Total	223 kg	Asian Standard					
57 kg
Snatch	104 kg	Oh Kwang-ok	North Korea	25 September 2026	Asian Games	Nagoya, Japan	
Clean & Jerk	134 kg	Oh Kwang-ok	North Korea	25 September 2026	Asian Games	Nagoya, Japan	
Total	238 kg	Oh Kwang-ok	North Korea	25 September 2026	Asian Games	Nagoya, Japan	
61 kg
Snatch	112 kg	Yang Liuyue	China	25 September 2026	Asian Games	Nagoya, Japan	
Clean & Jerk	142 kg	Pei Xinyi	China	1 November 2026	World Championships	Ningbo, China	
Total	254 kg	Pei Xinyi	China	1 November 2026	World Championships	Ningbo, China	
69 kg
Snatch	122 kg	Song Kuk-hyang	North Korea	3 November 2026	World Championships	Ningbo, China	
Clean & Jerk	153 kg	Song Kuk-hyang	North Korea	3 November 2026	World Championships	Ningbo, China	
Total	275 kg	Song Kuk-hyang	North Korea	3 November 2026	World Championships	Ningbo, China	
77 kg
Snatch	126 kg	Peng Cuiting	China	5 November 2026	World Championships	Ningbo, China	
Clean & Jerk	153 kg	Asian Standard					
Total	273 kg	Asian Standard					
86 kg
Snatch	128 kg	Asian Standard					
Clean & Jerk	163 kg	Liao Guifang	China	7 November 2026	World Championships	Ningbo, China	
Total	291 kg	Liao Guifang	China	7 November 2026	World Championships	Ningbo, China	
+86 kg
Snatch	147 kg	Li Yan	China	8 November 2026	World Championships	Ningbo, China	
Clean & Jerk	181 kg	Asian Standard					
Total	325 kg	Asian Standard					

== Historical records ==
=== Men (2025–2026) ===
Event	Record	Athlete	Nation	Date	Meet	Place	Ref
71 kg
Snatch	160 kg	He Yueji	China	5 October 2025	World Championships	Førde, Norway	
Clean & Jerk	197 kg	Ri Won-ju	North Korea	14 May 2026	Asian Championships	Gandhinagar, India	
Total	351 kg	Ri Won-ju	North Korea	14 May 2026	Asian Championships	Gandhinagar, India	
79 kg
Snatch	165 kg	Asian Standard					
Clean & Jerk	206 kg	Ri Ryong-hyon	North Korea	14 May 2026	Asian Championships	Gandhinagar, India	
Total	365 kg	Rizki Juniansyah	Indonesia	15 December 2025	SEA Games	Chonburi, Thailand	
88 kg
Snatch	174 kg	Asian Standard					
Clean & Jerk	220 kg	Ro Kwang-ryol	North Korea	15 May 2026	Asian Championships	Gandhinagar, India	
Total	387 kg	Ro Kwang-ryol	North Korea	15 May 2026	Asian Championships	Gandhinagar, India	
94 kg
Snatch	182 kg	Alireza Moeini	Iran	9 October 2025	World Championships	Førde, Norway	
Clean & Jerk	221 kg	Asian Standard					
Total	395 kg	Asian Standard					

=== Men (2018–2025) ===
Event	Record	Athlete	Nation	Date	Meet	Place	Ref
55 kg
Snatch	135 kg	Asian Standard					
Clean & Jerk	166 kg	Om Yun-chol	North Korea	18 September 2019	World Championships	Pattaya, Thailand	
Total	294 kg	Om Yun-chol	North Korea	18 September 2019	World Championships	Pattaya, Thailand	
61 kg
Snatch	146 kg	Li Fabin	China	2 April 2024	World Cup	Phuket, Thailand	
Clean & Jerk	175 kg	Li Fabin	China	7 December 2022	World Championships	Bogotá, Colombia	
Total	318 kg	Li Fabin	China	19 September 2019	World Championships	Pattaya, Thailand	
67 kg
Snatch	155 kg	Huang Minhao	China	6 July 2019	Olympics Test Event	Tokyo, Japan	
Clean & Jerk	190 kg	Ri Won-ju	North Korea	8 December 2024	World Championships	Manama, Bahrain	
Total	339 kg	Chen Lijun	China	21 April 2019	Asian Championships	Ningbo, China	
73 kg
Snatch	169 kg	Shi Zhiyong	China	20 April 2021	Asian Championships	Tashkent, Uzbekistan	
Clean & Jerk	205 kg	Rahmat Erwin Abdullah	Indonesia	11 May 2025	Asian Championships	Jiangshan, China	
Total	365 kg	Rizki Juniansyah	Indonesia	4 April 2024	World Cup	Phuket, Thailand	
81 kg
Snatch	175 kg	Li Dayin	China	21 April 2021	Asian Championships	Tashkent, Uzbekistan	
Clean & Jerk	209 kg	Rahmat Erwin Abdullah	Indonesia	11 September 2023	World Championships	Riyadh, Saudi Arabia	
Total	378 kg	Lü Xiaojun	China	22 September 2019	World Championships	Pattaya, Thailand	
89 kg
Snatch	180 kg	Li Dayin	China	10 May 2023	Asian Championships	Jinju, South Korea	
Clean & Jerk	222 kg	Tian Tao	China	10 May 2023	Asian Championships	Jinju, South Korea	
Total	396 kg	Li Dayin	China	10 May 2023	Asian Championships	Jinju, South Korea	
96 kg
Snatch	186 kg	Sohrab Moradi	Iran	7 November 2018	World Championships	Ashgabat, Turkmenistan	
Clean & Jerk	231 kg	Tian Tao	China	7 July 2019	Olympics Test Event	Tokyo, Japan	
Total	416 kg	Sohrab Moradi	Iran	7 November 2018	World Championships	Ashgabat, Turkmenistan	
102 kg
Snatch	187 kg	Döwranbek Hasanbaýew	Turkmenistan	8 April 2024	World Cup	Phuket, Thailand	
Clean & Jerk	232 kg	Liu Huanhua	China	8 April 2024	World Cup	Phuket, Thailand	
Total	413 kg	Liu Huanhua	China	8 April 2024	World Cup	Phuket, Thailand	
109 kg
Snatch	200 kg	Yang Zhe	China	24 April 2021	Asian Championships	Tashkent, Uzbekistan	
Clean & Jerk	242 kg	Ruslan Nurudinov	Uzbekistan	14 December 2024	World Championships	Manama, Bahrain	
Total	433 kg	Akbar Djuraev	Uzbekistan	16 December 2021	World Championships	Tashkent, Uzbekistan	
+109 kg
Snatch	217 kg	Gor Minasyan	Bahrain	13 May 2023	Asian Championships	Jinju, South Korea	
Clean & Jerk	262 kg	Alireza Yousefi	Iran	15 December 2024	World Championships	Manama, Bahrain	
Total	464 kg	Gor Minasyan	Bahrain	13 May 2023	Asian Championships	Jinju, South Korea	

=== Men (1998–2018) ===
Event	Record	Athlete	Nation	Date	Meet	Place	Ref
56 kg
Snatch	139 kg	Wu Jingbiao	China	21 November 2015	World Championships	Houston, United States	
Clean & Jerk	171 kg	Om Yun-chol	North Korea	21 November 2015	World Championships	Houston, United States	
Total	307 kg	Long Qingquan	China	7 August 2016	Olympic Games	Rio de Janeiro, Brazil	
62 kg
Snatch	154 kg	Kim Un-guk	North Korea	21 September 2014	Asian Games	Incheon, South Korea	
Clean & Jerk	183 kg	Chen Lijun	China	22 November 2015	World Championships	Houston, United States	
Total	333 kg	Chen Lijun	China	22 November 2015	World Championships	Houston, United States	
69 kg
Snatch	166 kg	Liao Hui	China	10 November 2014	World Championships	Almaty, Kazakhstan	
Clean & Jerk	198 kg	Liao Hui	China	23 October 2013	World Championships	Wrocław, Poland	
Total	359 kg	Liao Hui	China	10 November 2014	World Championships	Almaty, Kazakhstan	
77 kg
Snatch	177 kg	Lü Xiaojun	China	10 August 2016	Olympic Games	Rio de Janeiro, Brazil	
Clean & Jerk	208 kg	Mohammad Ali Falahatinejad	Iran	12 September 2003	Asian Championships	Qinhuangdao, China	
Total	380 kg	Lü Xiaojun	China	24 October 2013	World Championships	Wrocław, Poland	
85 kg
Snatch	180 kg	Lu Yong	China	15 August 2008	Olympic Games	Beijing, China	
Clean & Jerk	220 kg	Kianoush Rostami	Iran	31 May 2016	Fajr Cup	Tehran, Iran	
Total	396 kg	Kianoush Rostami	Iran	12 August 2016	Olympic Games	Rio de Janeiro, Brazil	
94 kg
Snatch	189 kg	Sohrab Moradi	Iran	25 August 2018	Asian Games	Jakarta, Indonesia	
Clean & Jerk	233 kg	Sohrab Moradi	Iran	3 December 2017	World Championships	Anaheim, United States	
Total	417 kg	Sohrab Moradi	Iran	3 December 2017	World Championships	Anaheim, United States	
105 kg
Snatch	195 kg	Cui Wenhua	China	14 November 1998	World Championships	Lahti, Finland	
Clean & Jerk	246 kg	Ilya Ilyin	Kazakhstan	12 December 2015	President's Cup	Grozny, Russia	
Total	437 kg	Ilya Ilyin	Kazakhstan	12 December 2015	President's Cup	Grozny, Russia	
+105 kg
Snatch	216 kg	Behdad Salimi	Iran	16 August 2016	Olympic Games	Rio de Janeiro, Brazil	
Clean & Jerk	263 kg	Hossein Rezazadeh	Iran	25 August 2004	Olympic Games	Athens, Greece	
Total	472 kg	Hossein Rezazadeh	Iran	26 September 2000	Olympic Games	Sydney, Australia	

=== Women (2025–2026) ===
Event	Record	Athlete	Nation	Date	Meet	Place	Ref
48 kg
Snatch	93 kg	Asian Standard					
Clean & Jerk	122 kg	Ri Song-gum	North Korea	2 October 2025	World Championships	Førde, Norway	
Total	213 kg	Ri Song-gum	North Korea	2 October 2025	World Championships	Førde, Norway	
58 kg
Snatch	105 kg	Kim Il-gyong	North Korea	13 May 2026	Asian Championships	Gandhinagar, India	
Clean & Jerk	132 kg	Asian Standard					
Total	236 kg	Kim Il-gyong	North Korea	4 October 2025	World Championships	Førde, Norway	
63 kg
Snatch	112 kg	Yang Liuyue	China	14 May 2026	Asian Championships	Gandhinagar, India	
Clean & Jerk	143 kg	Ri Suk	North Korea	14 May 2026	Asian Championships	Gandhinagar, India	
Total	254 kg	Ri Suk	North Korea	14 May 2026	Asian Championships	Gandhinagar, India	

=== Women (2018–2025) ===
Event	Record	Athlete	Nation	Date	Meet	Place	Ref
45 kg
Snatch	90 kg	Zhao Jinhong	China	9 May 2025	Asian Championships	Jiangshan, China	
Clean & Jerk	113 kg	Zhao Jinhong	China	6 December 2024	World Championships	Manama, Bahrain	
Total	200 kg	Zhao Jinhong	China	6 December 2024	World Championships	Manama, Bahrain	
49 kg
Snatch	97 kg	Hou Zhihui	China	1 April 2024	World Cup	Phuket, Thailand	
Clean & Jerk	125 kg	Ri Song-gum	North Korea	4 February 2024	Asian Championships	Tashkent, Uzbekistan	
Total	221 kg	Ri Song-gum	North Korea	1 April 2024	World Cup	Phuket, Thailand	
55 kg
Snatch	104 kg	Kang Hyon-gyong	North Korea	4 February 2024	Asian Championships	Tashkent, Uzbekistan	
Clean & Jerk	131 kg	Kang Hyon-gyong	North Korea	2 April 2024	World Cup	Phuket, Thailand	
Total	234 kg	Kang Hyon-gyong	North Korea	2 April 2024	World Cup	Phuket, Thailand	
59 kg
Snatch	111 kg	Kim Il-gyong	North Korea	2 October 2023	Asian Games	Hangzhou, China	
Clean & Jerk	141 kg	Kim Il-gyong	North Korea	9 December 2024	World Championships	Manama, Bahrain	
Total	249 kg	Kim Il-gyong	North Korea	9 December 2024	World Championships	Manama, Bahrain	
64 kg
Snatch	117 kg	Deng Wei	China	11 December 2019	World Cup	Tianjin, China	
Clean & Jerk	149 kg	Ri Suk	North Korea	10 December 2024	World Championships	Manama, Bahrain	
Total	264 kg	Ri Suk	North Korea	10 December 2024	World Championships	Manama, Bahrain	
71 kg
Snatch	122 kg	Yang Qiuxia	China	13 May 2025	Asian Championships	Jiangshan, China	
Clean & Jerk	155 kg	Song Kuk-hyang	North Korea	13 May 2025	Asian Championships	Jiangshan, China	
Total	276 kg	Song Kuk-hyang	North Korea	13 May 2025	Asian Championships	Jiangshan, China	
76 kg
Snatch	125 kg	Liao Guifang	China	13 May 2025	Asian Championships	Jiangshan, China	
Clean & Jerk	156 kg	Zhang Wangli	China	26 February 2019	World Cup	Fuzhou, China	
Total	279 kg	Liao Guifang	China	13 May 2025	Asian Championships	Jiangshan, China	
81 kg
Snatch	125 kg	Asian Standard					
Clean & Jerk	161 kg	Liang Xiaomei	China	12 December 2023	IWF Grand Prix	Doha, Qatar	
Total	284 kg	Liang Xiaomei	China	12 December 2023	IWF Grand Prix	Doha, Qatar	
87 kg
Snatch	130 kg	Asian Standard					
Clean & Jerk	162 kg	Asian Standard					
Total	289 kg	Asian Standard					
+87 kg
Snatch	149 kg	Li Yan	China	15 December 2024	World Championships	Manama, Bahrain	
Clean & Jerk	187 kg	Li Wenwen	China	25 April 2021	Asian Championships	Tashkent, Uzbekistan	
Total	335 kg	Li Wenwen	China	25 April 2021	Asian Championships	Tashkent, Uzbekistan	

=== Women (1998–2018) ===
Event	Record	Athlete	Nation	Date	Meet	Place	Ref
48 kg
Snatch	98 kg	Yang Lian	China	1 October 2006	World Championships	(Dominican Republic) Santo Domingo, Dominican Rep.	
Clean & Jerk	120 kg	Chen Xiexia	China	21 April 2007	Asian Championships	Tai'an, China	
Total	217 kg	Yang Lian	China	1 October 2006	World Championships	(Dominican Republic) Santo Domingo, Dominican Rep.	
53 kg
Snatch	103 kg	Li Ping	China	14 November 2010	Asian Games	Guangzhou, China	
Clean & Jerk	134 kg	Zulfiya Chinshanlo	Kazakhstan	10 November 2014	World Championships	Almaty, Kazakhstan	
Total	233 kg	Hsu Shu-ching	Chinese Taipei	21 September 2014	Asian Games	Incheon, South Korea	
58 kg
Snatch	111 kg	Chen Yanqing	China	3 December 2006	Asian Games	Doha, Qatar	
Clean & Jerk	142 kg	Kuo Hsing-chun	Chinese Taipei	21 August 2017	Universiade	Taipei, Taiwan	
Total	251 kg	Chen Yanqing	China	3 December 2006	Asian Games	Doha, Qatar	
63 kg
Snatch	116 kg	Pawina Thongsuk	Thailand	12 November 2005	World Championships	Doha, Qatar	
Clean & Jerk	147 kg	Deng Wei	China	9 August 2016	Olympic Games	Rio de Janeiro, Brazil	
Total	262 kg	Deng Wei	China	9 August 2016	Olympic Games	Rio de Janeiro, Brazil	
69 kg
Snatch	123 kg	Xiang Yanmei	China	24 October 2013	World Championships	Wrocław, Poland	
Clean & Jerk	154 kg	Liu Haixia	China	13 November 2005	World Championships	Doha, Qatar	
Total	275 kg	Liu Chunhong	China	19 August 2004	Olympic Games	Athens, Greece	
75 kg
Snatch	134 kg	Svetlana Podobedova	Kazakhstan	22 September 2010	World Championships	Antalya, Turkey	
Clean & Jerk	164 kg	Kim Un-ju	North Korea	25 September 2014	Asian Games	Incheon, South Korea	
Total	295 kg	Svetlana Podobedova	Kazakhstan	22 September 2010	World Championships	Antalya, Turkey	
90 kg
Snatch	123 kg	Nadezhda Nogay	Kazakhstan	22 September 2012	World Youth Championships	Košice, Slovakia	
Clean & Jerk	152 kg	Kim Un-ju	North Korea	17 September 2013	Asian Interclub Championships	Pyongyang, North Korea	
Total	272 kg	Nadezhda Nogay	Kazakhstan	14 May 2011	World Youth Championships	Lima, Peru	
+90 kg
Snatch	146 kg	Zhou Lulu	China	13 November 2011	World Championships	Paris, France	
Clean & Jerk	192 kg	Zhou Lulu	China	26 September 2014	Asian Games	Incheon, South Korea	
Total	334 kg	Zhou Lulu	China	26 September 2014	Asian Games	Incheon, South Korea	
