= Sohrab Moradi =

Iranian weightlifter (born 1988)

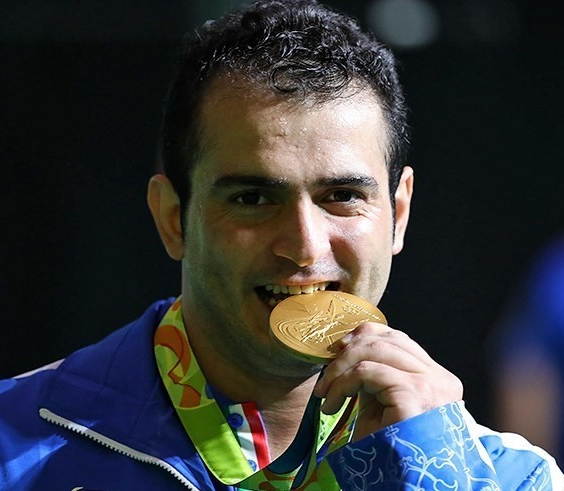
- Moradi at the 2016 Summer Olympics

Personal information
- Nationality: Iranian
- Born: 22 September 1988 (age 38) Sedeh Lenjan, Isfahan Province, Iran
- Height: 1.71 m (5 ft 7 in)
- Weight: 95.94 kg (212 lb)

Sport
- Country: Iran
- Sport: Weightlifting
- Event: –96 kg (2018-present)
- Coached by: Mohammad Hossein Barkhah

Achievements and titles
- Personal bests: Snatch: 189 kg (2018, WR); Clean and jerk: 233 kg (2017, WR); Total: 417 kg (2017, CWR)
Medal record
Representing Iran
Olympic Games
Gold medal – first place	2016 Rio de Janeiro	94 kg
World Championships
Gold medal – first place	2017 Anaheim	94 kg
Gold medal – first place	2018 Ashgabat	96 kg
Asian Games
Gold medal – first place	2018 Jakarta	94 kg
Asian Championships
Gold medal – first place	2009 Taldykorgan	85 kg
Gold medal – first place	2012 Pyeongtaek	85 kg
Silver medal – second place	2020 Tashkent	96 kg
Bronze medal – third place	2008 Kanazawa	77 kg
World Junior Championships
Bronze medal – third place	2008 Cali	77 kg

Sohrab Moradi (Persian: سهراب مرادی, born 22 September 1988) is a current world record holding retired Iranian weightlifter who won the gold medal in the 94 kg weight division at the 2016 Olympics. He currently holds the world record with a total of 417 kg in the 94 kg weight class. He formerly held world records in the snatch and clean and jerk categories. He was the Asian champion in the 85 kg weight class in 2009 and 2012.

In 2013, he was banned from the sport for two years for doping, after testing positive for methadone. Any opioid, in general, causes suppression of testosterone and therefore, it is likely that individuals entering methadone treatment already have reduced testosterone levels.

== Major results ==
Year	Venue	Weight	Snatch (kg)				Clean & Jerk (kg)				Total	Rank
Year	Venue	Weight	1	2	3	Rank	1	2	3	Rank	Total	Rank
Olympic Games
2012	London, United Kingdom	85 kg	~~166~~	~~166~~	~~166~~	--	--	--	--	--	--	--
2016	Rio de Janeiro, Brazil	94 kg	~~178~~	179	182	1	221	~~234~~	~~234~~	1	403	1st place, gold medalist(s)
World Championships
2007	Chiang Mai, Thailand	77 kg	~~145~~	145	153	14	~~175~~	~~175~~	175	29	328	22
2017	Anaheim, United States	94 kg	176	182	184	1st place, gold medalist(s)	220	233 CWR	--	1st place, gold medalist(s)	417 CWR	1st place, gold medalist(s)
2018	Ashgabat, Turkmenistan	96 kg	181	~~186~~	186 WR	1st place, gold medalist(s)	223	230 WR	~~237~~	1st place, gold medalist(s)	416 WR	1st place, gold medalist(s)
Asian Games
2018	Jakarta, Indonesia	94 kg	182	~~189~~	189 CWR	1	221	~~234~~	~~234~~	1	410	1st place, gold medalist(s)
Asian Championships
2008	Kanazawa, Japan	77 kg	142	146	~~150~~	3rd place, bronze medalist(s)	173	176	179	4	325	3rd place, bronze medalist(s)
2009	Taldykorgan, Kazakhstan	85 kg	163	165	168	1st place, gold medalist(s)	193	197	199	1st place, gold medalist(s)	367	1st place, gold medalist(s)
2011	Tongling, China	85 kg	151	~~157~~	157	5	180	~~190~~	~~193~~	7	337	6
2012	Pyeongtaek, South Korea	85 kg	168	172	~~175~~	2nd place, silver medalist(s)	210	~~216~~	216	1st place, gold medalist(s)	388	1st place, gold medalist(s)
2013	Astana, Kazakhstan	85 kg	~~158~~	158	~~161~~	--	190	200	--	--	--	DSQ
2021	Tashkent, Uzbekistan	96 kg	170	~~174~~	174	3rd place, bronze medalist(s)	210	~~220~~	~~220~~	2nd place, silver medalist(s)	384	2nd place, silver medalist(s)
2023	Jinju, South Korea	102 kg	157	162	~~166~~	9	200	~~210~~	~~221~~	7	362	8
World Junior Championships
2008	Cali, Colombia	77 kg	~~141~~	~~141~~	141	5	170	~~177~~	177	4	318	3rd place, bronze medalist(s)
Minor Competitions
2017	Ashgabat, Turkmenistan (AIMAG)	94 kg	176	181	185	1st place, gold medalist(s)	~~220~~	220	228	1st place, gold medalist(s)	413	1st place, gold medalist(s)
