= Rim Un-sim =

North Korean weightlifter (born 1996)

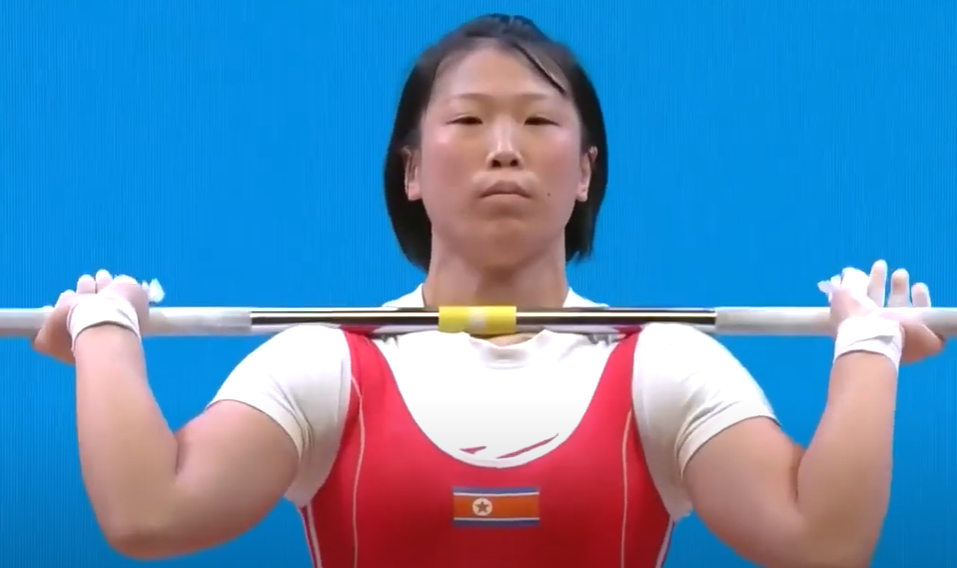
- Rim in 2019

Personal information
- Nationality: North Korean
- Born: 5 July 1996 (age 29) Pyongyang, North Korea
- Height: 1.60 m (5 ft 3 in)
- Weight: 64.00 kg (141 lb)

Sport
- Country: North Korea
- Sport: Weightlifting
- Event: –64 kg
- Club: Kigwancha Sports Club
Medal record
Women's weightlifting
Representing North Korea
World Championships
Silver medal – second place	2018 Ashgabat	–64 kg
Silver medal – second place	2019 Pattaya	–64 kg
Silver medal – second place	2024 Manama	–64 kg
Asian Games
Gold medal – first place	2018 Jakarta-Palembang	–69 kg
Gold medal – first place	2022 Hangzhou	–64 kg
Asian Championships
Gold medal – first place	2017 Ashgabat	–63 kg
Gold medal – first place	2019 Ningbo	–71 kg
FISU World University Games
Gold medal – first place	2017 Taipei	–63 kg

Rim Un-sim (born 5 July 1996) is a North Korean weightlifter.

She participated at the 2018 World Weightlifting Championships, winning a medal.

== Personal life ==
Has an older sister Rim Jong-sim who is a weightlifter in 76 kg division.
