= Kim Il-gyong =

North Korean weightlifter (born 2003)

Personal information
- Born: 27 July 2003 (age 22)

Sport
- Country: North Korea
- Sport: Weightlifting
- Weight class: 59 kg
Medal record
Women's weightlifting
Representing North Korea
World Championships
Gold medal – first place	2024 Manama	59 kg
Gold medal – first place	2025 Førde	58 kg
Asian Games
Gold medal – first place	2022 Hangzhou	59 kg
Asian Championships
Gold medal – first place	2024 Tashkent	59 kg
Gold medal – first place	2025 Jiangshan	59 kg
Gold medal – first place	2026 Gandhinagar	58 kg

Kim Il-gyong (Korean: 김일경; born 27 July 2003) is a North Korean weightlifter. She won the gold medal in the women's 59 kg event at the 2024 World Weightlifting Championships held in Bahrain. Kim also won the gold medal in her event at the 2022 Asian Games held in Hangzhou, China. She set a new world record in the Snatch.

Kim won the gold medal in the women's 59 kg event at the 2024 Asian Weightlifting Championships held in Tashkent, Uzbekistan.

== Achievements ==
Year	Venue	Weight	Snatch (kg)				Clean & Jerk (kg)				Total	Rank
Year	Venue	Weight	1	2	3	Rank	1	2	3	Rank	Total	Rank
World Championships
2024	Manama, Bahrain	59 kg	103	106	108	1st place, gold medalist(s)	130	134	141 CWR	1st place, gold medalist(s)	249 CWR	1st place, gold medalist(s)
2025	Førde, Norway	58 kg	100	102	104	1st place, gold medalist(s)	128	132	~~134~~	1st place, gold medalist(s)	236 CWR	1st place, gold medalist(s)
Asian Games
2023	Hangzhou, China	59 kg	103	107	111 CWR	—N/a	127	132	135	—N/a	246	1st place, gold medalist(s)
