= Pak Myong-jin =

North Korean weightlifter (born 2003)

Personal information
- Born: April 2, 2003 (age 23) North Korea
- Weight: 65 kg (143 lb)

Sport
- Country: North Korea
- Sport: Weightlifting

Achievements and titles
- Personal bests: Snatch: 135 kg (2025); Clean & Jerk: 180 kg (2025); Total: 315 kg (2025)
Medal record
Men's weightlifting
Representing North Korea
World Championships
| Gold medal – first place | 2024 Manama | 61 kg |
| Gold medal – first place | 2026 Ningbo | 65 kg |
| Silver medal – second place | 2025 Førde | 65 kg |
Asian Games
| Gold medal – first place | 2026 Aichi–Nagoya | 65 kg |
| Silver medal – second place | 2022 Hangzhou | 61 kg |
Asian Championships
| Gold medal – first place | 2024 Tashkent | 61 kg |
| Gold medal – first place | 2025 Jiangshan | 61 kg |
| Silver medal – second place | 2026 Gandhinagar | 65 kg |
World Cup
| Bronze medal – third place | 2024 Phuket | 61 kg |

Korean name
- Hangul: 박명진
- RR: Bak Myeongjin
- MR: Pak Myŏngjin

Pak Myong-jin (Korean: 박명진; born 2 April 2003) is a North Korean weightlifter competing in the men's 65 kg category. He won the gold medal in the men's 61 kg event at the 2024 World Weightlifting Championships held in Manama, Bahrain, a gold medal in the men's 61 kg event at the 2024 Asian Weightlifting Championships held in Tashkent, Uzbekistan, and a silver medal at the 2022 Asian Games held in Hangzhou, China.

== Achievements ==
| Year | Venue | Weight | Snatch (kg) | | | | Clean & Jerk (kg) | | | | Total | Rank |
| Year | Venue | Weight | 1 | 2 | 3 | Rank | 1 | 2 | 3 | Rank | Total | Rank |
World Championships
| 2024 | Manama, Bahrain | 61 kg | 129 | ~~132~~ | 132 | 1st place, gold medalist(s) | 165 | 169 | 173 | 1st place, gold medalist(s) | 305 | 1st place, gold medalist(s) |
| 2025 | Førde, Norway | 65 kg | 135 | ~~139~~ | ~~139~~ | 5 | 175 | ~~179~~ | 180 | 1st place, gold medalist(s) | 315 | 2nd place, silver medalist(s) |
| 2026 | Ningbo, China | 65 kg | 140 | 144 | ~~147~~ | 4 | 179 | 183 | 187 WR | 1st place, gold medalist(s) | 331 WR | 1st place, gold medalist(s) |
Asian Championships
| 2024 | Tashkent, Uzbekistan | 61 kg | 131 | ~~134~~ | 134 | 1st place, gold medalist(s) | 166 | 168 | 172 | 1st place, gold medalist(s) | 306 | 1st place, gold medalist(s) |
| 2025 | Jiangshan, China | 61 kg | 131 | 136 | ~~140~~ | 2nd place, silver medalist(s) | ~~167~~ | 167 | 170 | 1st place, gold medalist(s) | 306 | 1st place, gold medalist(s) |
| 2026 | Ghandinagar, India | 65 kg | 137 | 141 | 144 | 3rd place, bronze medalist(s) | 177 | ~~182~~ | ~~182~~ | 2nd place, silver medalist(s) | 321 | 2nd place, silver medalist(s) |
Asian Games
| 2022 | Hangzhou, China | 61 kg | 131 | ~~136~~ | 136 | —N/a | 166 | 171 | ~~175~~ | —N/a | 307 | 2nd place, silver medalist(s) |
| 2026 | Nagoya, Japan | 65 kg | 140 | 144 | 146 | —N/a | ~~178~~ | 178 | 182 | —N/a | 328 | 1st place, gold medalist(s) |
