= List of Danish records in Olympic weightlifting =

The following are the national records in Olympic weightlifting in Denmark. Records are maintained in each weight class for the snatch lift, clean and jerk lift, and the total for both lifts by the Dansk Vægtløftnings-Forbund (DVF).

== Current records ==
=== Men ===
Event	Record	Athlete	Date	Meet	Place	Ref
60 kg
Snatch	100 kg	Standard				
Clean & Jerk	115 kg	Standard				
Total	212 kg	Standard				
65 kg
Snatch	108 kg	Standard				
Clean & Jerk	133 kg	Standard				
Total	238 kg	Standard				
70 kg
Snatch	114 kg	Standard				
Clean & Jerk	139 kg	Standard				
Total	250 kg	Standard				
75 kg
Snatch	124 kg	Tim Kring	24 September 2026	World Masters Championships	Athens, Greece	
Clean & Jerk	152 kg	Standard				
Total	271 kg	Tim Kring	24 September 2026	World Masters Championships	Athens, Greece	
85 kg
Snatch	133 kg	Standard				
Clean & Jerk	158 kg	Standard				
Total	288 kg	Standard				
95 kg
Snatch	140 kg	Tobias Spedtsberg	8 November 2026			
Clean & Jerk	165 kg	Tobias Spedtsberg	8 November 2026			
Total	305 kg	Tobias Spedtsberg	8 November 2026			
110 kg
Snatch	149 kg	Standard				
Clean & Jerk	187 kg	Standard				
Total	333 kg	Standard				
+110 kg
Snatch	150 kg	Standard				
Clean & Jerk	188 kg	Standard				
Total	335 kg	Standard				

=== Women ===
Event	Record	Athlete	Date	Meet	Place	Ref
49 kg
Snatch	70 kg	Standard				
Clean & Jerk	85 kg	Standard				
Total	153 kg	Standard				
53 kg
Snatch	76 kg	Standard				
Clean & Jerk	93 kg	Standard				
Total	166 kg	Standard				
57 kg
Snatch	80 kg	Standard				
Clean & Jerk	98 kg	Standard				
Total	175 kg	Standard				
61 kg
Snatch	84 kg	Standard				
Clean & Jerk	104 kg	Standard				
Total	185 kg	Standard				
69 kg
Snatch	91 kg	Standard				
Clean & Jerk	112 kg	Standard				
Total	200 kg	Standard				
77 kg
Snatch	93 kg	Caroline Gernsøe	5 November 2026	World Championships	Ningbo, China	
Clean & Jerk	118 kg	Standard				
Total	208 kg	Laura Vest Tolstrup	5 November 2026	World Championships	Ningbo, China	
86 kg
Snatch	110 kg	Anne Vejsgaard Jensen	6 November 2026	World Championships	Ningbo, China	
Clean & Jerk	121 kg	Anne Vejsgaard Jensen	6 November 2026	World Championships	Ningbo, China	
Total	231 kg	Anne Vejsgaard Jensen	6 November 2026	World Championships	Ningbo, China	
+86 kg
Snatch	108 kg	Aurelia Rebekka Pedersen	8 November 2026	World Championships	Ningbo, China	
Clean & Jerk	136 kg	Aurelia Rebekka Pedersen	8 November 2026	World Championships	Ningbo, China	
Total	244 kg	Aurelia Rebekka Pedersen	8 November 2026	World Championships	Ningbo, China	

== Historical records ==
=== Men (2025–2026) ===
Event	Record	Athlete	Date	Meet	Place	Ref
60 kg
Snatch	100 kg	Standard				
Clean & Jerk	115 kg	Standard				
Total	212 kg	Standard				
65 kg
Snatch	108 kg	Standard				
Clean & Jerk	133 kg	Standard				
Total	238 kg	Standard				
71 kg
Snatch	115 kg	Standard				
Clean & Jerk	140 kg	Standard				
Total	252 kg	Standard				
79 kg
Snatch	130 kg	Gustav Wang Hansen	27 June 2026	Danish Team Championships	Herning, Denmark	
Clean & Jerk	157 kg	Gustav Wang Hansen	21 March 2026	Danish Championships	Copenhagen, Denmark	
Total	286 kg	Gustav Wang Hansen	27 June 2026	Danish Team Championships	Herning, Denmark	
88 kg
Snatch	135 kg	Standard				
Clean & Jerk	160 kg	William Hichmann Madsen	4 October 2025	Aalborg Cup	Aalborg, Denmark	
Total	292 kg	Standard				
94 kg
Snatch	140 kg	Standard				
Clean & Jerk	165 kg	Standard				
Total	302 kg	Standard				
110 kg
Snatch	155 kg	Jacob Panayotis Diakovasilis	28 June 2025	Danish Team Championships	Aalborg, Denmark	
Clean & Jerk	187 kg	Standard				
Total	335 kg	Jacob Panayotis Diakovasilis	28 June 2025	Danish Team Championships	Aalborg, Denmark	
+110 kg
Snatch	150 kg	Standard				
Clean & Jerk	188 kg	Standard				
Total	335 kg	Standard				

=== Men (2018–2025) ===
Event	Record	Athlete	Date	Meet	Place	Ref
55 kg
Snatch	80 kg	Standard				
Clean & Jerk	100 kg	Standard				
Total	180 kg	Standard				
61 kg
Snatch	101 kg	Niels Áki Mørk	15 March 2025	Danish Championships	Fredericia, Denmark	
Clean & Jerk	120 kg	Standard				
Total	220 kg	Standard				
67 kg
Snatch	110 kg	Standard				
Clean & Jerk	140 kg	Standard				
Total	250 kg	Standard				
73 kg
Snatch	139 kg	Tim Kring	18 January 2020	Copenhagen Weightlifting Cup		
Clean & Jerk	170 kg	Tim Kring	12 October 2019	Nordic Championships	Vigrestad, Norway	
Total	307 kg	Tim Kring	9 April 2019	European Championships	Batumi, Georgia	
81 kg
Snatch	145 kg	Omed Alam	9 March 2019	Danish Championships	Slagelse, Denmark	
Clean & Jerk	174 kg	Omed Alam	5 November 2018	World Championships	Ashgabat, Turkmenistan	
Total	319 kg	Omed Alam	10 April 2019	European Championships	Batumi, Georgia	
89 kg
Snatch	153 kg	Omed Alam	13 May 2022	Danish Championships	Odense, Denmark	
Clean & Jerk	185 kg	Omed Alam	28 October 2023	Nordic Championships	Landskrona, Sweden	
Total	333 kg	Omed Alam	21 October 2022 (Note: by official result source; 15 October 2022 by DVF source, a typo)	European U23 Championships	Durrës, Albania	
96 kg
Snatch	150 kg	Omed Alam	12 December 2022 (Note: by official result source; 8 December 2022 by DVF source, a typo)	World Championships	Bogotá, Colombia	
Clean & Jerk	183 kg	Omed Alam	18 October 2024	Nordic Championships	Runavík, Denmark	
Total	333 kg	Omed Alam	18 October 2024	Nordic Championships	Runavík, Denmark	
102 kg
Snatch	151 kg	Omed Alam	25 January 2025	Copenhagen Weightlifting Cup	Copenhagen, Denmark	
Clean & Jerk	194 kg	Jacob Panayotis Diakovasilis	19 April 2025	European Championships	Chișinău, Moldova	
Total	341 kg	Jacob Panayotis Diakovasilis	19 April 2025	European Championships	Chișinău, Moldova	
109 kg
Snatch	152 kg	Mikkel Andersen	17 November 2018		Denmark	
Clean & Jerk	190 kg	Jacob Panayotis Diakovasilis	28 January 2024	Reykjavik International Games	Reykjavik, Iceland	
Total	340 kg	Jacob Panayotis Diakovasilis	28 January 2024	Reykjavik International Games	Reykjavik, Iceland	
+109 kg
Snatch	151 kg	Mikkel Andersen	15 December 2018		Denmark	
Clean & Jerk	185 kg	Mikkel Andersen	27 April 2019		Denmark	
Total	331 kg	Mikkel Andersen	15 December 2018		Denmark	

=== Men (1998–2018) ===
Event	Record	Athlete	Date	Meet	Place	Ref
–56 kg
Snatch	84 kg	Omed Alam	9 March 2013	Danish Junior Championships	Denmark	
Clean & Jerk	107 kg	Jacob Heiner Søndergaard	5 March 2011	Danish Championships	Denmark	
Total	187 kg	Jacob Heiner Søndergaard	5 March 2011	Danish Championships	Denmark	
–62 kg
Snatch	110 kg	Sonny Hartmann	16 May 1998	Danish Club Championships	Denmark	
Clean & Jerk	130.5 kg	Sonny Hartmann	6 February 1999	Danish Championships	Denmark	
Total	237.5 kg	Sonny Hartmann	7 February 1998	Danish Championships	Denmark	
–69 kg
Snatch	145 kg	Armenak Takhmazian	25 April 2000	European Championships	Sofia, Bulgaria	
Clean & Jerk	170 kg	Armenak Takhmazian	23 November 1999	World Championships	Athens, Greece	
Total	315 kg	Armenak Takhmazian	25 April 2000	European Championships	Sofia, Bulgaria	
–77 kg
Snatch	143 kg	Tim Kring	10 March 2018	Danish Championships	Slagelse, Denmark	
Clean & Jerk	175 kg	Tim Kring	1 December 2017	World Championships	Anaheim, United States	
Total	317 kg	Tim Kring	1 December 2017	World Championships	Anaheim, United States	
-85 kg
Snatch	145 kg	Jesper Jørgensen	26 February 2005		Denmark	
Clean & Jerk	170 kg	Jesper Jørgensen	11 December 2004		Denmark	
Total	312.5 kg	Jesper Jørgensen	22 January 2005		Denmark	
–94 kg
Snatch	155 kg	Maciej Makinia	5 March 2011	Danish Championships	Denmark	
Clean & Jerk	192.5 kg	Jacob Asp	12 November 1998	World Championships	Lahti, Finland	
Total	342.5 kg	Jacob Asp	12 November 1998	World Championships	Lahti, Finland	
–105 kg
Snatch	160 kg	Bahador Maleki	6 October 2012	AL-Bank Cup	Denmark	
Clean & Jerk	190 kg	Bahador Maleki	6 October 2012	AL-Bank Cup	Denmark	
Total	350 kg	Bahador Maleki	6 October 2012	AL-Bank Cup	Denmark	
+105 kg
Snatch	160 kg	Bahador Maleki	4 May 2013	Danish Club Championships	Denmark	
Clean & Jerk	185 kg	Henrik Nobel	16 April 1999	European Championships	A Coruña, Spain	
Total	340 kg	Henrik Nobel	16 April 1999	European Championships	A Coruña, Spain	

=== Women (2025–2026) ===
Event	Record	Athlete	Date	Meet	Place	Ref
48 kg
Snatch	69 kg	Standard				
Clean & Jerk	84 kg	Standard				
Total	150 kg	Standard				
53 kg
Snatch	76 kg	Standard				
Clean & Jerk	93 kg	Diana Brogaard	19 April 2026	European Championships	Batumi, Georgia	
Total	166 kg	Standard				
58 kg
Snatch	81 kg	Standard				
Clean & Jerk	99 kg	Standard				
Total	177 kg	Standard				
63 kg
Snatch	85 kg	Standard				
Clean & Jerk	107 kg	Amalie Løvind	4 October 2025	World Championships	Førde, Norway	
Total	190 kg	Amalie Løvind	4 October 2025	World Championships	Førde, Norway	
69 kg
Snatch	98 kg	Line Ravn Gude	7 October 2025	World Championships	Førde, Norway	
Clean & Jerk	120 kg	Line Ravn Gude	7 October 2025	World Championships	Førde, Norway	
Total	218 kg	Line Ravn Gude	7 October 2025	World Championships	Førde, Norway	
77 kg
Snatch	95 kg	Laura Vest Tolstrup	8 October 2025	World Championships	Førde, Norway	
Clean & Jerk	125 kg	Line Ravn Gude	28 June 2025	Danish Championships	Aalborg, Denmark	
Total	217 kg	Line Ravn Gude	28 June 2025	Danish Championships	Aalborg, Denmark	
86 kg
Snatch	110 kg	Anne Vejsgaard Jensen	21 March 2026	Danish Championships	Copenhagen, Denmark	
Clean & Jerk	120 kg	Standard				
Total	226 kg	Anne Vejsgaard Jensen	15 November 2025	Nordic Championships	Garðabær, Iceland	
+86 kg
Snatch	108 kg	Aurelia Rebekka Pedersen	25 April 2026	European Championships	Batumi, Georgia	
Clean & Jerk	132 kg	Aurelia Rebekka Pedersen	25 April 2026	European Championships	Batumi, Georgia	
Total	240 kg	Aurelia Rebekka Pedersen	25 April 2026	European Championships	Batumi, Georgia	

=== Women (2018–2025) ===
Event	Record	Athlete	Date	Meet	Place	Ref
45 kg
Snatch	49 kg	Elin Franzen Nilsson	27 May 2023			
Clean & Jerk	62 kg	Alberte Saugmann Schmidt	20 January 2024	Copenhagen Weightlifting Cup	Copenhagen, Denmark	
Total	108 kg	Elin Franzen Nilsson	13 May 2023	Copenhagen Weightlifting Cup	Copenhagen, Denmark	
49 kg
Snatch	76 kg	Sandra Høgfeldt Jensen	3 April 2021	European Championships	Moscow, Russia	
Clean & Jerk	92 kg	Sandra Høgfeldt Jensen	11 May 2021	Open Championships	Cali, Colombia	
Total	167 kg	Sandra Høgfeldt Jensen	3 April 2021	European Championships	Moscow, Russia	
55 kg
Snatch	84 kg	Katrine Bruhn	29 May 2022	European Championships	Tirana, Albania	
Clean & Jerk	105 kg	Katrine Bruhn	13 May 2022	Danish Championships	Odense, Denmark	
Total	188 kg	Katrine Bruhn	13 May 2022	Danish Championships	Odense, Denmark	
59 kg
Snatch	86 kg	Amalie Løvind	11 March 2023	Danish Championships	Copenhagen, Denmark	
Clean & Jerk	112 kg	Amalie Løvind	17 April 2023	European Championships	Yerevan, Armenia	
Total	195 kg	Amalie Løvind	9 December 2024	World Championships	Manama, Bahrain	
64 kg
Snatch	90 kg	Josephine Rehl	19 April 2024	Danish Championships	Herning, Denmark	
Clean & Jerk	110 kg	Josephine Rehl	19 April 2024	Danish Championships	Herning, Denmark	
Total	200 kg	Josephine Rehl	19 April 2024	Danish Championships	Herning, Denmark	
71 kg
Snatch	100 kg	Line Ravn Gude	18 October 2024	Nordic Championships	Runavík, Denmark	
Clean & Jerk	128 kg	Line Ravn Gude	15 March 2025	Danish Championships	Fredericia, Denmark	
Total	227 kg	Line Ravn Gude	18 October 2024	Nordic Championships	Runavík, Denmark	
76 kg
Snatch	94 kg	Laura Vest Tolstrup	18 April 2025	European Championships	Chișinău, Moldova	
Clean & Jerk	120 kg	Laura Vest Tolstrup	12 December 2024	World Championships	Manama, Bahrain	
Total	212 kg	Laura Vest Tolstrup	12 December 2024	World Championships	Manama, Bahrain	
81 kg
Snatch	96 kg	Clara Jul Andreasen	5 November 2022			
Clean & Jerk	116 kg	Clara Jul Andreasen	5 November 2022			
Total	212 kg	Clara Jul Andreasen	5 November 2022			
87 kg
Snatch	110 kg	Anne Vejsgaard Jensen	19 April 2024	Danish Championships	Herning, Denmark	
Clean & Jerk	124 kg	Anne Vejsgaard Jensen	13 May 2023	Copenhagen Weightlifting Cup	Copenhagen, Denmark	
Total	232 kg	Anne Vejsgaard Jensen	19 April 2024	Danish Championships	Herning, Denmark	
+87 kg
Snatch	102 kg	Louise Vennekilde	1 March 2020	Malta International Open	Cospicua, Malta	
Clean & Jerk	123 kg	Louise Vennekilde	31 August 2019	Aalborg Cup	Aalborg, Denmark	
Total	220 kg	Louise Vennekilde	31 August 2019	Aalborg Cup	Aalborg, Denmark	

=== Women (1998–2018) ===
Event	Record	Athlete	Date	Meet	Place	Ref
–48 kg
Snatch	49 kg	Mia Ørvad Jensen	1 April 2006	Danish Youth Championships	Denmark	
Clean & Jerk	62 kg	Serap Tamer	5 November 2016		Denmark	
Total	109 kg	Mia Ørvad Jensen	1 April 2006	Danish Youth Championships	Denmark	
–53 kg
Snatch	76 kg	Katrine Bruhn	29 November 2017	World Championships	Anaheim, United States	
Clean & Jerk	94 kg	Katrine Bruhn	27 March 2018	European Championships	Bucharest, Romania	
Total	169 kg	Katrine Bruhn	29 November 2017	World Championships	Anaheim, United States	
–58 kg
Snatch	79 kg	Amalie Løvind	10 March 2018	Danish Championships	Slagelse, Denmark	
Clean & Jerk	100 kg	Amalie Løvind	10 March 2018	Danish Championships	Slagelse, Denmark	
Total	179 kg	Amalie Løvind	10 March 2018	Danish Championships	Slagelse, Denmark	
–63 kg
Snatch	81 kg	Laura Hammelstrup	3 January 2015	Ladies Open	Denmark	
Clean & Jerk	103 kg	Amanda Nowakowska Poulsen	26 May 2018	Danish Club Championships	Copenhagen, Denmark	
Total	183 kg	Laura Hammelstrup	3 January 2015	Ladies Open	Denmark	
–69 kg
Snatch	84 kg	Julie Hougård Nielsen	20 January 2018	Copenhagen Cup	Copenhagen, Denmark	
Clean & Jerk	102.5 kg	Tina Beiter	9 October 1999	Nordic Championships	Copenhagen, Denmark	
Total	181 kg	Julie Hougård Nielsen	20 January 2018	Copenhagen Cup	Copenhagen, Denmark	
–75 kg
Snatch	79 kg	Mette Fasmila Pedersen	4 November 2017		Denmark	
Clean & Jerk	100 kg	Sofie Dehli	10 March 2018	Danish Championships	Slagelse, Denmark	
Total	176 kg	Sofie Dehli	10 March 2018	Danish Championships	Slagelse, Denmark	
–90 kg
Snatch	91 kg	Louise Vennekilde	16 December 2017		Odense, Denmark	
Clean & Jerk	111 kg	Louise Vennekilde	16 December 2017		Odense, Denmark	
Total	202 kg	Louise Vennekilde	16 December 2017		Odense, Denmark	
+90 kg
Snatch	95 kg	Louise Vennekilde	26 May 2018	Danish Club Championships	Copenhagen, Denmark	
Clean & Jerk	115 kg	Louise Vennekilde	26 May 2018	Danish Club Championships	Copenhagen, Denmark	
Total	210 kg	Louise Vennekilde	26 May 2018	Danish Club Championships	Copenhagen, Denmark	
