= 2024 World Weightlifting Championships – Women's 64 kg =

Women's 64 kg at the 2024 World Weightlifting Championships
- Venue: Weightlifting Marquee Venue
- Location: Manama, Bahrain
- Dates: 10 December
- Competitors: 44 from 35 nations
- Winning total: 264 kg

Medalists
gold medal	Ri Suk	North Korea
silver medal	Rim Un-sim	North Korea
bronze medal	Li Shuang	China

The women's 64 kilograms competition at the 2024 World Weightlifting Championships was held on 10 December 2024.

== Schedule ==
Date	Time	Event
10 December 2024	08:00	Group D
10 December 2024	10:00	Group C
10 December 2024	15:00	Group B
10 December 2024	20:00	Group A

== Records ==
Prior to this competition, the existing world records were as follows.

World Record	Snatch	Deng Wei (CHN)	117 kg	Tianjin, China	11 December 2019
World Record	Clean & Jerk	Ri Suk (PRK)	146 kg	Doha, Qatar	9 December 2023
World Record	Total	Deng Wei (CHN)	261 kg	Pattaya, Thailand	22 September 2019

== Results ==
Rank	Athlete	Group	Snatch (kg)				Clean & Jerk (kg)				Total
Rank	Athlete	Group	1	2	3	Rank	1	2	3	Rank	Total
1st place, gold medalist(s)	Ri Suk (PRK)	A	108	112	115	2nd place, silver medalist(s)	143	147	149 CWR	1st place, gold medalist(s)	264 CWR
2nd place, silver medalist(s)	Rim Un-sim (PRK)	A	111	114	116	1st place, gold medalist(s)	140	~~147~~	~~148~~	2nd place, silver medalist(s)	256
3rd place, bronze medalist(s)	Li Shuang (CHN)	A	100	105	107	3rd place, bronze medalist(s)	125	130	134	3rd place, bronze medalist(s)	241
4	Ingrid Segura (COL)	A	100	103	~~105~~	5	128	132	~~135~~	4	235
5	Concepción Úsuga (COL)	A	100	~~104~~	106	4	122	127	~~131~~	6	233
6	Elreen Ando (PHI)	A	100	~~104~~	~~104~~	8	129	~~133~~	~~135~~	5	229
7	Sophia Shaft (USA)	B	95	~~100~~	101	7	120	124	~~127~~	10	225
8	Phạm Thị Hồng Thanh (VIE)	B	95	99	~~101~~	10	119	124	~~128~~	9	223
9	Sarah Davies (GBR)	A	95	~~98~~	~~98~~	17	119	123	127	7	222
10	Katharine Estep (USA)	C	92	95	98	11	115	119	123	11	221
11	Giulia Miserendino (ITA)	A	95	99	102	6	115	~~116~~	~~121~~	22	217
12	Svitlana Moskvina (UKR)	A	96	98	100	9	114	~~117~~	117	19	217
13	Dziyana Maiseyevich (AIN)	B	95	98	~~101~~	12	115	~~118~~	118	16	216
14	Naroa Arrasate (ESP)	B	~~90~~	90	94	18	~~116~~	119	122	12	216
15	Queysi Rojas (MEX)	B	~~92~~	92	96	13	115	119	~~121~~	14	215
16	Shakhlokhon Abdullaeva (UZB)	B	~~94~~	95	~~99~~	16	115	119	~~121~~	15	214
17	Karla Ortiz (MEX)	B	92	~~96~~	~~96~~	20	116	120	~~124~~	13	212
18	Karina Goricheva (KAZ)	B	95	~~99~~	~~99~~	15	110	113	~~115~~	24	208
19	Jawaher Gesmi (TUN)	B	85	88	90	27	115	~~118~~	118	16	208
20	Casey Aguilar-Gervase (PUR)	C	88	~~91~~	91	24	~~111~~	114	~~117~~	23	205
21	Tsabitha Alfiah Ramadani (INA)	C	90	~~95~~	95	14	105	109	~~111~~	32	204
22	Garoa Martínez (ESP)	C	88	92	~~96~~	19	112	~~116~~	~~116~~	25	204
23	Ditimoni Sonowal (IND)	C	86	89	~~92~~	29	115	~~119~~	~~119~~	21	204
24	Vicky Graillot (FRA)	C	88	~~91~~	~~91~~	30	116	~~121~~	~~122~~	20	204
25	Monica Knowlton (CAN)	D	82	~~85~~	86	33	112	117	~~120~~	18	203
26	Galya Shatova (BUL)	C	~~90~~	91	~~94~~	23	108	112	~~116~~	26	203
27	Laurène Fauvel (FRA)	C	88	91	~~93~~	22	108	112	~~115~~	27	203
28	Park Da-hui (KOR)	B	92	~~96~~	~~96~~	21	110	~~114~~	~~114~~	30	202
29	Tian Xin-jie (TPE)	C	85	88	~~90~~	31	~~112~~	112	~~115~~	28	200
30	Patricie Ježková (CZE)	B	~~90~~	~~90~~	90	28	110	~~114~~	~~114~~	31	200
31	Tatiana Ullua (ARG)	C	~~90~~	90	~~93~~	25	~~108~~	108	~~112~~	33	198
32	Paula Zikowsky (AUT)	C	~~87~~	87	90	26	~~105~~	105	~~109~~	35	195
33	Hannah Crymble (IRL)	D	83	86	~~88~~	32	101	104	~~107~~	36	190
34	Nur Syazwani Radzi (MAS)	D	~~83~~	83	85	34	105	~~110~~	~~111~~	34	190
35	Tenishia Thornton (MLT)	D	79	82	~~85~~	35	95	100	~~105~~	39	182
36	Bibiána Večeřová (SVK)	D	78	~~81~~	~~81~~	37	97	101	104	37	182
37	Amalía Ósk Sigurðardóttir (ISL)	D	~~80~~	80	~~83~~	36	100	~~105~~	~~105~~	38	180
38	Ailbhe Mulvihill (IRL)	D	70	~~73~~	73	40	~~86~~	~~86~~	86	40	159
39	Mae Al-Madani (UAE)	D	64	67	~~70~~	41	80	85	~~90~~	41	152
40	Alzahraa Khamshad (KUW)	D	55	60	64	42	75	~~80~~	~~80~~	42	139
—	Mun Min-hee (KOR)	B	~~98~~	~~98~~	~~98~~	—	—	—	—	—	—
—	Chaima Rahmouni (TUN)	B	~~91~~	~~91~~	~~91~~	—	—	—	—	—	—
—	Li Wei-chia (TPE)	D	70	75	~~80~~	39	—	—	—	—	—
—	Mafalda Monteiro (POR)	D	76	~~81~~	~~82~~	38	~~104~~	~~105~~	~~105~~	—	—
—	Seyedeh Ghazal Hosseini (IRI)	C	Did not start								
