= Won Hyon-sim =

North Korean weightlifter (born 2002)

Personal information
- Born: April 2, 2002 (age 24) North Korea
- Weight: 45 kg (99 lb)

Sport
- Country: North Korea
- Sport: Weightlifting

Achievements and titles
- Personal bests: Snatch: 87 kg (2024); Clean & Jerk: 109 kg (2024); Total: 196 kg (2024)
Medal record
Women's weightlifting
Representing North Korea
World Championships
Silver medal – second place	2024 Manama	45 kg
Asian Championships
Gold medal – first place	2024 Tashkent	45 kg
World Cup
Silver medal – second place	2024 Phuket	45 kg

Korean name
- Hangul: 원현심
- RR: Won Hyeonsim
- MR: Wŏn Hyŏnsim

Won Hyon-sim (Korean: 원현심; born 2 April 2002) is a North Korean female weightlifter competing in the women's 45 kg category. She won the silver medal in the women's 45 kg event at the 2024 World Weightlifting Championships held in Manama, Bahrain, and a gold medal in the women's 45 kg event at the 2024 Asian Weightlifting Championships held in Tashkent, Uzbekistan.

Won is a former record holder at Snatch, Clean & Jerk and Total at the 45 kg category with a total best of 196 kg.

== Achievements ==
Year	Venue	Weight	Snatch (kg)				Clean & Jerk (kg)				Total	Rank
Year	Venue	Weight	1	2	3	Rank	1	2	3	Rank	Total	Rank
World Championships
2024	Manama, Bahrain	45 kg	82	86	~~88~~	2nd place, silver medalist(s)	105	~~112~~	~~112~~	1st place, gold medalist(s)	191	2nd place, silver medalist(s)
Asian Championships
2024	Tashkent, Uzbekistan	45 kg			86	1st place, gold medalist(s)			106	1st place, gold medalist(s)	192	1st place, gold medalist(s)
