= World record progression women's weightlifting =

This is the list of world records progression in women's weightlifting. Records are maintained in each weight class for the snatch lift, clean and jerk lift, and the total for both lifts.

The International Weightlifting Federation restructured its weight classes in 1993, 1998, 2018 and 2025, nullifying earlier records.

== 49 kg ==
=== Snatch ===
Athlete	Record (kg)	Date	Meet	Place	Ref.
World Standard	93	1 August 2026	—	—	
(North Korea) Ri Song-gum	94	23 September 2026	Asian Games	Nagoya	

=== Clean & Jerk ===
Athlete	Record (kg)	Date	Meet	Place	Ref.
World Standard	120	1 August 2026	—	—	
(North Korea) Ri Song-gum	121	23 September 2026	Asian Games	Nagoya	

=== Total ===
Athlete	Record (kg)	Date	Meet	Place	Ref.
World Standard	211	1 August 2026	—	—	
(North Korea) Ri Song-gum	215	23 September 2026	Asian Games	Nagoya	

== 53 kg ==
=== Snatch ===
Athlete	Record (kg)	Date	Meet	Place	Ref.
World Standard	99	1 June 2025	—	—	

=== Clean & Jerk ===
Athlete	Record (kg)	Date	Meet	Place	Ref.
World Standard	126	1 June 2025	—	—	

=== Total ===
Athlete	Record (kg)	Date	Meet	Place	Ref.
World Standard	223	1 June 2025	—	—	

== 57 kg ==
=== Snatch ===
Athlete	Record (kg)	Date	Meet	Place	Ref.
World Standard	102	1 August 2026	—	—	
(North Korea) Oh Kwang-ok	104	25 September 2026	Asian Games	Nagoya	

=== Clean & Jerk ===
Athlete	Record (kg)	Date	Meet	Place	Ref.
World Standard	131	1 August 2026	—	—	
(North Korea) Oh Kwang-ok	132	25 September 2026	Asian Games	Nagoya	
(North Korea) Oh Kwang-ok	134	25 September 2026	Asian Games	Nagoya	

=== Total ===
Athlete	Record (kg)	Date	Meet	Place	Ref.
World Standard	231	1 August 2026	—	—	
(North Korea) Oh Kwang-ok	236	25 September 2026	Asian Games	Nagoya	
(North Korea) Oh Kwang-ok	238	25 September 2026	Asian Games	Nagoya	

== 61 kg ==
=== Snatch ===
Athlete	Record (kg)	Date	Meet	Place	Ref.
World Standard	107	1 August 2026	—	—	
(North Korea) Pak Jin-hae	109	25 September 2026	Asian Games	Nagoya	
(China) Yang Liuyue	110	25 September 2026	Asian Games	Nagoya	
(China) Yang Liuyue	112	25 September 2026	Asian Games	Nagoya	

=== Clean & Jerk ===
Athlete	Record (kg)	Date	Meet	Place	Ref.
World Standard	136	1 August 2026	—	—	
(North Korea) Pak Jin-hae	139	25 September 2026	Asian Games	Nagoya	
(China) Pei Xinyi	140	1 November 2026	World Championships	Ningbo	
(China) Pei Xinyi	142	1 November 2026	World Championships	Ningbo	

=== Total ===
Athlete	Record (kg)	Date	Meet	Place	Ref.
World Standard	241	1 August 2026	—	—	
(China) Yang Liuyue	247	25 September 2026	Asian Games	Nagoya	
(North Korea) Pak Jin-hae	248	25 September 2026	Asian Games	Nagoya	
(China) Yang Liuyue	251	25 September 2026	Asian Games	Nagoya	
(China) Pei Xinyi	252	1 November 2026	World Championships	Ningbo	
(China) Pei Xinyi	254	1 November 2026	World Championships	Ningbo	

== 69 kg ==
=== Snatch ===
Athlete	Record (kg)	Date	Meet	Place	Ref.
World Standard	116	1 June 2025	—	—	
(United States) Olivia Reeves	117	16 July 2025	Pan American Championships	Cali	
(United States) Olivia Reeves	119	16 July 2025	Pan American Championships	Cali	
(North Korea) Song Kuk-hyang	120	7 October 2025	World Championships	Førde	
(North Korea) Song Kuk-hyang	121	27 September 2026	Asian Games	Nagoya	
(North Korea) Song Kuk-hyang	122	3 November 2026	World Championships	Ningbo	

=== Clean & Jerk ===
Athlete	Record (kg)	Date	Meet	Place	Ref.
World Standard	145	1 June 2025	—	—	
(United States) Olivia Reeves	146	16 July 2025	Pan American Championships	Cali	
(United States) Olivia Reeves	149	16 July 2025	Pan American Championships	Cali	
(North Korea) Song Kuk-hyang	150	7 October 2025	World Championships	Førde	
(North Korea) Song Kuk-hyang	151	15 May 2026	Asian Championships	Gandhinagar	
(North Korea) Song Kuk-hyang	152	27 September 2026	Asian Games	Nagoya	
(North Korea) Song Kuk-hyang	153	3 November 2026	World Championships	Ningbo	

=== Total ===
Athlete	Record (kg)	Date	Meet	Place	Ref.
World Standard	259	1 June 2025	—	—	
(United States) Olivia Reeves	260	16 July 2025	Pan American Championships	Cali	
(United States) Olivia Reeves	265	16 July 2025	Pan American Championships	Cali	
(United States) Olivia Reeves	268	16 July 2025	Pan American Championships	Cali	
(North Korea) Song Kuk-hyang	270	7 October 2025	World Championships	Førde	
(North Korea) Song Kuk-hyang	273	27 September 2026	Asian Games	Nagoya	
(North Korea) Song Kuk-hyang	275	3 November 2026	World Championships	Ningbo	

== 77 kg ==
=== Snatch ===
Athlete	Record (kg)	Date	Meet	Place	Ref.
World Standard	122	1 June 2025	—	—	
(United States) Olivia Reeves	123	8 October 2025	World Championships	Førde	
(China) Peng Cuiting	124	5 November 2026	World Championships	Ningbo	
(China) Peng Cuiting	126	5 November 2026	World Championships	Ningbo	

=== Clean & Jerk ===
Athlete	Record (kg)	Date	Meet	Place	Ref.
World Standard	154	1 June 2025	—	—	
(United States) Olivia Reeves	155	8 October 2025	World Championships	Førde	

=== Total ===
Athlete	Record (kg)	Date	Meet	Place	Ref.
World Standard	274	1 June 2025	—	—	
(United States) Olivia Reeves	278	8 October 2025	World Championships	Førde	

== 86 kg ==
=== Snatch ===
Athlete	Record (kg)	Date	Meet	Place	Ref.
World Standard	129	1 June 2025	—	—	

=== Clean & Jerk ===
Athlete	Record (kg)	Date	Meet	Place	Ref.
World Standard	162	1 June 2025	—	—	
(China) Liao Guifang	163	7 November 2026	World Championships	Ningbo	

=== Total ===
Athlete	Record (kg)	Date	Meet	Place	Ref.
World Standard	289	1 June 2025	—	—	
(China) Liao Guifang	290	7 November 2026	World Championships	Ningbo	
(China) Liao Guifang	291	7 November 2026	World Championships	Ningbo	

== +86 kg ==
=== Snatch ===
Athlete	Record (kg)	Date	Meet	Place	Ref.
World Standard	144	1 June 2025	—	—	
(China) Li Yan	145	17 May 2026	Asian Championships	Gandhinagar	
(China) Li Yan	146	8 November 2026	World Championships	Ningbo	
(China) Li Yan	147	8 November 2026	World Championships	Ningbo	

=== Clean & Jerk ===
Athlete	Record (kg)	Date	Meet	Place	Ref.
World Standard	181	1 June 2025	—	—	

=== Total ===
Athlete	Record (kg)	Date	Meet	Place	Ref.
World Standard	325	1 June 2025	—	—	

== June 2025 – August 2026 records ==
Following the introduction of the new bodyweight categories from 1 August 2026, the International Weightlifting Federation announced the new World Standards for the new weights but kept the records for those bodyweight categories that remained unchanged from the previous revision.

=== 48 kg ===
Snatch

Athlete	Record (kg)	Date	Meet	Place	Ref.
World Standard	93	1 June 2025	—	—	

Clean & Jerk

Athlete	Record (kg)	Date	Meet	Place	Ref.
World Standard	119	1 June 2025	—	—	
(North Korea) Ri Song-gum	120	2 October 2025	World Championships	Førde	
(North Korea) Ri Song-gum	122	2 October 2025	World Championships	Førde	

Total

Athlete	Record (kg)	Date	Meet	Place	Ref.
World Standard	210	1 June 2025	—	—	
(North Korea) Ri Song-gum	211	2 October 2025	World Championships	Førde	
(North Korea) Ri Song-gum	213	2 October 2025	World Championships	Førde	

=== 58 kg ===
Snatch

Athlete	Record (kg)	Date	Meet	Place	Ref.
World Standard	105	1 June 2025	—	—	

Clean & Jerk

Athlete	Record (kg)	Date	Meet	Place	Ref.
World Standard	132	1 June 2025	—	—	

Total

Athlete	Record (kg)	Date	Meet	Place	Ref.
World Standard	235	1 June 2025	—	—	
(North Korea) Kim Il-gyong	236	4 October 2025	World Championships	Førde	

=== 63 kg ===
Snatch

Athlete	Record (kg)	Date	Meet	Place	Ref.
World Standard	110	1 June 2025	—	—	
(North Korea) Ri Suk	111	5 October 2025	World Championships	Førde	
(China) Yang Liuyue	112	14 May 2026	Asian Championships	Gandhinagar	

Clean & Jerk

Athlete	Record (kg)	Date	Meet	Place	Ref.
World Standard	139	1 June 2025	—	—	
(North Korea) Ri Suk	140	5 October 2025	World Championships	Førde	
(North Korea) Ri Suk	142	5 October 2025	World Championships	Førde	
(North Korea) Ri Suk	143	14 May 2026	Asian Championships	Gandhinagar	

Total

Athlete	Record (kg)	Date	Meet	Place	Ref.
World Standard	246	1 June 2025	—	—	
(North Korea) Ri Suk	247	5 October 2025	World Championships	Førde	
(North Korea) Ri Suk	251	5 October 2025	World Championships	Førde	
(North Korea) Ri Suk	253	5 October 2025	World Championships	Førde	
(North Korea) Ri Suk	254	14 May 2026	Asian Championships	Gandhinagar	

== See also ==
- World record progression men's weightlifting
- World record progression men's weightlifting (2018–2025)
- World record progression men's weightlifting (1998–2018)
- World record progression men's weightlifting (1993–1997)
- World record progression women's weightlifting (2018–2025)
- World record progression women's weightlifting (1998–2018)
