= 2024 World Weightlifting Championships – Women's 45 kg =

Women's 45 kg at the 2024 World Weightlifting Championships
- Venue: Weightlifting Marquee Venue
- Location: Manama, Bahrain
- Dates: 6 December
- Competitors: 11 from 10 nations
- Winning total: 200 kg

Medalists
gold medal	Zhao Jinhong	China
silver medal	Won Hyon-sim	North Korea
bronze medal	Phạm Đình Thi	Vietnam

The women's 45 kilograms competition at the 2024 World Weightlifting Championships was held on 6 December 2024.

== Schedule ==
Date	Time	Event
6 December 2024	17:30	Group A

== Records ==
Prior to this competition, the existing world records were as follows.

World Record	Snatch	Won Hyon-sim (PRK)	87 kg	Phuket, Thailand	31 March 2024
World Record	Clean & Jerk	Won Hyon-sim (PRK)	109 kg	Phuket, Thailand	31 March 2024
World Record	Total	Won Hyon-sim (PRK)	196 kg	Phuket, Thailand	31 March 2024

== Results ==
Rank	Athlete	Group	Snatch (kg)				Clean & Jerk (kg)				Total
Rank	Athlete	Group	1	2	3	Rank	1	2	3	Rank	Total
1st place, gold medalist(s)	Zhao Jinhong (CHN)	A	83	87	~~88~~	1st place, gold medalist(s)	105	110	113 CWR	1st place, gold medalist(s)	200 CWR
2nd place, silver medalist(s)	Won Hyon-sim (PRK)	A	82	86	~~88~~	2nd place, silver medalist(s)	105	~~112~~	~~112~~	2nd place, silver medalist(s)	191
3rd place, bronze medalist(s)	Phạm Đình Thi (VIE)	A	73	~~75~~	~~76~~	5	95	97	~~99~~	3rd place, bronze medalist(s)	170
4	Cansu Bektaş (TUR)	A	~~74~~	74	~~77~~	4	93	~~96~~	~~97~~	6	167
5	Cicely Kyle (USA)	A	72	~~75~~	~~76~~	6	92	95	~~98~~	5	167
6	Gamze Altun (TUR)	A	67	70	~~72~~	8	93	~~96~~	96	4	166
7	Marta García (ESP)	A	73	75	~~77~~	3rd place, bronze medalist(s)	86	89	~~92~~	7	164
8	Hong Zi-yu (TPE)	A	70	~~72~~	72	7	88	~~90~~	~~91~~	8	160
9	Mariangeli Martínez (VEN)	A	63	66	68	9	85	88	~~90~~	9	156
10	María Barco (MEX)	A	~~63~~	~~63~~	63	10	82	~~90~~	~~94~~	10	145
—	Rosina Randafiarison (MAD)	A	~~73~~	~~73~~	~~73~~	—	—	—	—	—	—
