= List of Kosovan records in Olympic weightlifting =

The following are the national records in Olympic weightlifting in Kosovo. Records are maintained in each weight class for the snatch lift, clean and jerk lift, and the total for both lifts by the Kosovo Weightlifting Federation.

== Current records ==
=== Men ===
Event	Record	Athlete	Date	Meet	Place	Ref
60 kg
Snatch						
Clean & Jerk						
Total						
85 kg
Snatch	158 kg	Brayan Ibanez	16 October 2026	European Junior Championships	Durrës, Albania	
Clean & Jerk	188 kg	Brayan Ibanez	16 October 2026	European Junior Championships	Durrës, Albania	
Total	346 kg	Brayan Ibanez	16 October 2026	European Junior Championships	Durrës, Albania	

=== Women ===
Event	Record	Athlete	Date	Meet	Place	Ref
61 kg
Snatch						
Clean & Jerk						
Total						
69 kg
Snatch	106 kg	Emily Ibanez	3 November 2026	World Championships	Ningbo, China	
Clean & Jerk	134 kg	Emily Ibanez	3 November 2026	World Championships	Ningbo, China	
Total	240 kg	Emily Ibanez	3 November 2026	World Championships	Ningbo, China	

== Historical records ==
=== Men (2018–2025) ===
Event	Record	Athlete	Date	Meet	Place	Ref
55 kg
Snatch						
Clean & Jerk	47 kg	Ilir Beka	26 March 2023	Youth World Championships	Durrës, Albania	
Total						
61 kg
Snatch						
Clean & Jerk						
Total						
67 kg
Snatch						
Clean & Jerk						
Total						
73 kg
Snatch						
Clean & Jerk						
Total						
81 kg
Snatch	105 kg	Arbnor Krasniqi	4 November 2018	World Championships	Ashgabat, Turkmenistan	
Clean & Jerk	130 kg	Arbnor Krasniqi	4 November 2018	World Championships	Ashgabat, Turkmenistan	
Total	235 kg	Arbnor Krasniqi	4 November 2018	World Championships	Ashgabat, Turkmenistan	
89 kg
Snatch						
Clean & Jerk						
Total						
96 kg
Snatch	90 kg	Bleron Latifi	3 June 2022	European Championships	Tirana, Albania	
Clean & Jerk	110 kg	Bleron Latifi	3 June 2022	European Championships	Tirana, Albania	
Total	200 kg	Bleron Latifi	3 June 2022	European Championships	Tirana, Albania	
102 kg
Snatch						
Clean & Jerk						
Total						
109 kg
Snatch	95 kg	Bleron Latifi	15 November 2022	International Naim Süleymanoğlu Tournament	Ankara, Turkey	
Clean & Jerk	115 kg	Bleron Latifi	15 November 2022	International Naim Süleymanoğlu Tournament	Ankara, Turkey	
Total	210 kg	Bleron Latifi	15 November 2022	International Naim Süleymanoğlu Tournament	Ankara, Turkey	
+109 kg
Snatch	95 kg	Endrit Hoxha	12 February 2020	International Solidarity Championships	Tashkent, Uzbekistan	
Clean & Jerk	116 kg	Endrit Hoxha	12 February 2020	International Solidarity Championships	Tashkent, Uzbekistan	
Total	211 kg	Endrit Hoxha	12 February 2020	International Solidarity Championships	Tashkent, Uzbekistan	

=== Women ===
Event	Record	Athlete	Date	Meet	Place	Ref
45 kg
Snatch						
Clean & Jerk						
Total						
49 kg
Snatch						
Clean & Jerk						
Total						
55 kg
Snatch	61 kg	Leonora Brajshori	29 October 2019	San Diego International Open	San Diego, United States	
Clean & Jerk	81 kg	Leonora Brajshori	13 August 2019	European Championships	Batumi, Georgia	
Total	142 kg	Leonora Brajshori	29 October 2019	San Diego International Open	San Diego, United States	
59 kg
Snatch						
Clean & Jerk						
Total						
64 kg
Snatch						
Clean & Jerk						
Total						
71 kg
Snatch						
Clean & Jerk						
Total						
76 kg
Snatch						
Clean & Jerk						
Total						
81 kg
Snatch						
Clean & Jerk						
Total						
87 kg
Snatch						
Clean & Jerk						
Total						
+87 kg
Snatch						
Clean & Jerk						
Total						
