= Elreen Ando =

Filipino weightlifter (born 1998)

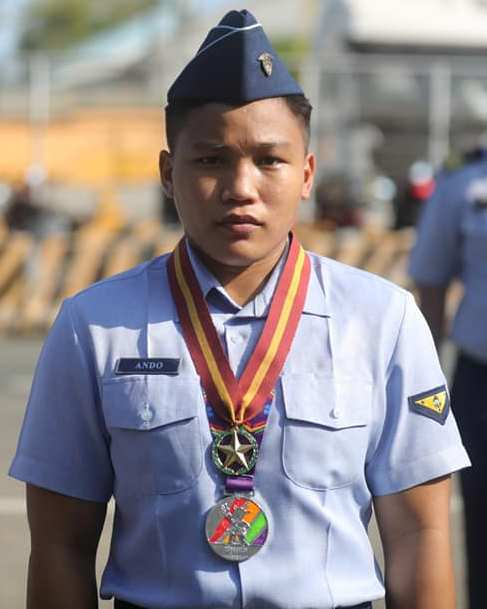
- Ando in 2022

Personal information
- Full name: Elreen Ann Quinilitan Ando
- Nationality: Filipino
- Born: November 1, 1998 (age 27)
- Home town: Cebu City
- Education: University of Cebu
- Height: 1.57 m (5 ft 2 in)
- Weight: 64 kg (141 lb)

Sport
- Country: Philippines
- Sport: Weightlifting
- Weight class: -64 kg
Medal record
Event	1st	2nd	3rd
World Championships	0	0	1
Asian Games	0	0	1
Asian Championships	0	1	0
Southeast Asian Games	2	2	0
Total	2	3	2
Women's weightlifting
Representing Philippines
World Championships
Bronze medal – third place	2025 Førde	-63 kg
Asian Games
Bronze medal – third place	2022 Hangzhou	-64 kg
Asian Championships
Silver medal – second place	2020 Tashkent	-64 kg
Silver medal – second place	2024 Tashkent	-59 kg
Silver medal – second place	2025 Jiangshan	-64 kg
Southeast Asian Games
Gold medal – first place	2025 Thailand	-63 kg
Gold medal – first place	2023 Cambodia	-59 kg
Silver medal – second place	2021 Vietnam	-64 kg
Silver medal – second place	2019 Philippines	-64 kg

Elreen Ann Quinilitan Ando (born November 1, 1998) is a Filipino weightlifter.

== Career ==
A native of Carreta, Cebu City, Ando became part of the Philippine national weightlifting team after she was scouted by coaches Garry Toleno and former olympian Ramon Solis when she was still a junior high school student at the University of Cebu (UC). As a result, UC then granted her a collegiate scholarship.

Ando participated at the 2020 Asian Weightlifting Championships in Tashkent, Uzbekistan where she clinched three medals: bronze in snatch, silver in the clean and jerk, and another silver for the overall lift.

Ando competed in the –64 kg women's weightlifting event of the 2020 Summer Olympics. She qualified through the Absolute Continental Ranking. She placed seventh overall, but set new personal bests in the process.

On April 3, 2024, Ando qualified for the 2024 Summer Olympics in Paris after garnering enough Olympic qualifying ranking following the conclusion of the IWF World Cup in Thailand. She qualified for the –59 kg class event at the expense of Filipino Olympic gold medalist Hidilyn Diaz. She finished in 6th place with a total result of 230 kg.

Ando won a clean and jerk bronze at the 2025 World Weightlifting Championships in Førde, Norway in the –63kg women's event.

== Major results ==
Year	Venue	Weight	Snatch (kg)				Clean & Jerk (kg)				Total	Rank
Year	Venue	Weight	1	2	3	Rank	1	2	3	Rank	Total	Rank
Olympic Games
2021	Tokyo, Japan	64 kg	96	~~99~~	100	—N/a	118	~~122~~	122	—N/a	222	7
2024	Paris, France	59 kg	~~100~~	100	~~102~~	—N/a	~~130~~	~~130~~	130	—N/a	230	6
World Championships
2019	Pattaya, Thailand	64 kg	95	98	~~100~~	10	115	118	~~121~~	17	216	11
2021	Tashkent, Uzbekistan	59 kg	94	96	98	5	~~116~~	~~116~~	116	6	214	5
2022	Bogotá, Colombia	59 kg	97	~~101~~	~~102~~	8	~~127~~	—	—	—	—	—
2023	Riyadh, Saudi Arabia	59 kg	95	98	100	7	118	122	~~125~~	11	222	8
2025	Førde, Norway	63 kg	~~100~~	100	~~103~~	6	129	131	~~133~~	3rd place, bronze medalist(s)	231	4
IWF World Cup
2019	Tianjin, China	64 kg	90	95	~~98~~	5	112	113	~~118~~	5	208	5
2020	Rome, Italy	64 kg	~~88~~	88	91	6	110	~~116~~	~~117~~	7	201	6
2024	Phuket, Thailand	59 kg	98	100	~~102~~	11	~~125~~	125	128	6	228	7
Asian Games
2018	Jakarta, Indonesia	63 kg	85	90	~~93~~	—N/a	105	111	~~115~~	—N/a	201	4
2023	Hangzhou, China	64 kg	93	~~95~~	96	—N/a	117	122	126	—N/a	222	3rd place, bronze medalist(s)
Asian Championships
2019	Ningbo, China	64 kg	~~90~~	~~90~~	90	13	110	~~115~~	~~117~~	13	200	14
2021	Tashkent, Uzbekistan	64 kg	94	~~97~~	~~97~~	3rd place, bronze medalist(s)	115	119	~~121~~	2nd place, silver medalist(s)	213	2nd place, silver medalist(s)
2023	Jinju, South Korea	59 kg	95	~~98~~	99	5	~~125~~	~~125~~	~~125~~	—	—	—
2024	Tashkent, Uzbekistan	59 kg	~~93~~	~~93~~	93	5	117	120	~~124~~	2nd place, silver medalist(s)	213	2nd place, silver medalist(s)
2025	Jiangshan, China	64 kg	98	102	~~105~~	2nd place, silver medalist(s)	130	~~134~~	~~135~~	2nd place, silver medalist(s)	232	2nd place, silver medalist(s)
