= 2017 World Weightlifting Championships – Women's 69 kg =

The Women's 69 kg competition at the 2017 World Weightlifting Championships was held on 2 December 2017.

== Schedule ==
Date	Time	Event
1 December 2017	10:55	Group B
2 December 2017	15:25	Group A

== Medalists ==
Event	Gold		Silver		Bronze	
Snatch	Miyareth Mendoza (COL)	106 kg	Mattie Rogers (USA)	104 kg	Leydi Solís (COL)	104 kg
Clean & Jerk	Sara Ahmed (EGY)	136 kg	Leydi Solís (COL)	135 kg	Mattie Rogers (USA)	131 kg
Total	Leydi Solís (COL)	239 kg	Mattie Rogers (USA)	235 kg	Miyareth Mendoza (COL)	233 kg

== Records ==
Prior to this competition, the existing world records were as follows.

World Record	Snatch	Oxana Slivenko (RUS)	123 kg	Santo Domingo, Dominican	4 October 2006
World Record	Clean & Jerk	Zarema Kasaeva (RUS)	157 kg	Doha, Qatar	13 November 2005
World Record	Total	Oxana Slivenko (RUS)	276 kg	Chiang Mai, Thailand	24 September 2007

== Results ==
Rank	Athlete	Group	Snatch (kg)				Clean & Jerk (kg)				Total
Rank	Athlete	Group	1	2	3	Rank	1	2	3	Rank	Total
1st place, gold medalist(s)	Leydi Solís (COL)	A	~~104~~	104	~~107~~	3rd place, bronze medalist(s)	135	~~137~~	~~137~~	2nd place, silver medalist(s)	239
2nd place, silver medalist(s)	Mattie Rogers (USA)	A	101	104	~~107~~	2nd place, silver medalist(s)	131	~~135~~	~~135~~	3rd place, bronze medalist(s)	235
3rd place, bronze medalist(s)	Miyareth Mendoza (COL)	A	~~102~~	102	106	1st place, gold medalist(s)	123	127	~~130~~	5	233
4	Anacarmen Torres (MEX)	A	96	99	~~101~~	7	125	128	~~132~~	4	227
5	Hung Wan-ting (TPE)	A	98	100	~~102~~	5	122	125	~~130~~	7	225
6	Giorgia Bordignon (ITA)	A	95	~~100~~	100	6	117	122	~~130~~	8	222
7	Patricia Strenius (SWE)	A	94	~~99~~	~~99~~	10	121	~~127~~	127	6	221
8	Punam Yadav (IND)	B	93	96	98	8	120	~~123~~	~~125~~	9	218
9	Angie Palacios (ECU)	B	90	~~94~~	95	9	112	116	120	11	215
10	Nguyễn Thị Vân (VIE)	B	90	93	~~95~~	12	~~115~~	115	120	10	213
11	Apolonia Vaivai (FIJ)	B	94	~~97~~	~~97~~	11	111	~~115~~	115	13	209
12	Kristel Macrohon (PHI)	B	85	~~90~~	~~90~~	13	110	~~115~~	115	12	200
13	Sólveig Sigurðardóttir (ISL)	B	82	~~86~~	~~86~~	14	~~103~~	104	108	14	190
14	Aníta Líf Aradóttir (ISL)	B	~~78~~	78	~~81~~	15	100	104	~~111~~	15	182
15	Arcangeline Fouodji (CMR)	B	~~75~~	75	~~80~~	16	~~100~~	~~100~~	100	16	175
—	Kim Su-hyeon (KOR)	A	100	103	~~105~~	4	~~130~~	~~132~~	~~132~~	—	—
—	Sara Ahmed (EGY)	A	~~102~~	~~104~~	~~104~~	—	126	132	136	1st place, gold medalist(s)	—
DQ	Romela Begaj (ALB)	A	103	105	107	—	125	128	~~131~~	—	—
