= 2024 IWF World Cup =

- Host city: Phuket, Thailand
- Dates: 31 March – 11 April
- Main venue: Phuket Rajabhat University Hall
- Website: https://tawa.or.th/2024iwfworldcup

The 2024 IWF World Cup was a weightlifting competition held in Phuket, Thailand from 31 March to 11 April 2024.

The event served as a mandatory event to qualify for the 2024 Summer Olympics in Paris, France.

== Schedule ==
All times are Thailand Standard Time (UTC+07:00)

Men's events
Date →	Mon 1		Tue 2		Wed 3	Thu 4				Fri 5		Sat 6			Sun 7		Mon 8			Wed 10	Thu 11		
Event ↓	11:30	19:00	13:30	16:00	11:30	11:00	13:30	16:00	19:00	14:30	16:30	13:30	16:00	19:00	11:00	16:00	11:00	13:30	19:00	19:00	11:00	13:30	16:00
55 kg		A																					
61 kg	C		B	A																			
67 kg								A															
73 kg					D	C	B		A														
81 kg													A										
89 kg										D	C	B		A									
96 kg																A							
102 kg															D		C	B	A				
109 kg																				A			
+109 kg																					C	B	A

Women's events
Date →	Sun 31		Mon 1		Tue 2		Wed 3			Fri 5	Sat 6		Sun 7		Mon 8	Tue 9				Wed 10	
Event ↓	14:30	19:00	13:30	16:00	11:00	19:00	13:30	16:00	19:00	19:00	09:00	11:00	13:30	19:00	16:00	11:00	13:30	16:00	19:00	13:30	16:00
45 kg		A																			
49 kg	C		B	A																	
55 kg						A															
59 kg					D		C	B	A												
64 kg										A											
71 kg											D	C	B	A							
76 kg															A						
81 kg																C	B	A			
87 kg																			A		
+87 kg																				B	A

== Medal summary ==
=== Men ===
Event	Gold		Silver		Bronze	
55 kg
Snatch	Lại Gia Thành; Vietnam	120 kg	Natthawat Chomchuen; Thailand	119 kg	Pang Un-chol; North Korea	118 kg
Clean & Jerk	Pang Un-chol; North Korea	152 kg	Natthawat Chomchuen; Thailand	150 kg	Lại Gia Thành; Vietnam	148 kg
Total	Pang Un-chol; North Korea	270 kg	Natthawat Chomchuen; Thailand	269 kg	Lại Gia Thành; Vietnam	268 kg
61 kg
Snatch	Li Fabin; China	146 kg WR	Eko Yuli Irawan; Indonesia	133 kg	Nguyễn Trần Anh Tuấn; Vietnam	132 kg
Clean & Jerk	Hampton Morris; United States	176 kg WR	Theerapong Silachai; Thailand	171 kg	Pak Myong-jin; North Korea	170 kg
Total	Li Fabin; China	312 kg	Hampton Morris; United States	303 kg	Pak Myong-jin; North Korea	301 kg
67 kg
Snatch	Sergio Massidda; Italy	145 kg	Ri Won-ju; North Korea	144 kg	Mohammad Yasin; Indonesia	133 kg
Clean & Jerk	Ri Won-ju; North Korea	189 kg WR	Ishimbek Muratbek Uulu; Kyrgyzstan	172 kg	Sergio Massidda; Italy	172 kg
Total	Ri Won-ju; North Korea	333 kg	Sergio Massidda; Italy	317 kg	Ishimbek Muratbek Uulu; Kyrgyzstan	294 kg
73 kg
Snatch	Shi Zhiyong; China	165 kg	Rizki Juniansyah; Indonesia	164 kg	Rahmat Erwin Abdullah; Indonesia	160 kg
Clean & Jerk	Rizki Juniansyah; Indonesia	201 kg	Rahmat Erwin Abdullah; Indonesia	195 kg	Bak Joo-hyo; South Korea	195 kg
Total	Rizki Juniansyah; Indonesia	365 kg WR	Shi Zhiyong; China	356 kg	Rahmat Erwin Abdullah; Indonesia	355 kg
81 kg
Snatch	Ri Chong-song; North Korea	166 kg	Maksat Meredow; Turkmenistan	146 kg	Samuel Guertin; Canada	140 kg
Clean & Jerk	Ri Chong-song; North Korea	200 kg	Maksat Meredow; Turkmenistan	182 kg	Samuel Guertin; Canada	175 kg
Total	Ri Chong-song; North Korea	366 kg	Maksat Meredow; Turkmenistan	328 kg	Samuel Guertin; Canada	315 kg
89 kg
Snatch	Yeison López; Colombia	182 kg WR	Karlos Nasar; Bulgaria	181 kg	Li Dayin; China	173 kg
Clean & Jerk	Karlos Nasar; Bulgaria	215 kg	Yeison López; Colombia	210 kg	Antonino Pizzolato; Italy	210 kg
Total	Karlos Nasar; Bulgaria	396 kg	Yeison López; Colombia	392 kg	Li Dayin; China	383 kg
96 kg
Snatch	Won Jong-beom; South Korea	170 kg	Karim Abokahla; Egypt	165 kg	Braydon James Kennedy; Canada	165 kg
Clean & Jerk	Won Jong-beom; South Korea	219 kg	Karim Abokahla; Egypt	205 kg	Braydon James Kennedy; Canada	193 kg
Total	Won Jong-beom; South Korea	389 kg	Karim Abokahla; Egypt	370 kg	Braydon James Kennedy; Canada	358 kg
102 kg
Snatch	Döwranbek Hasanbaýew; Turkmenistan	187 kg AR	Lesman Paredes; Bahrain	186 kg	Garik Karapetyan; Armenia	185 kg
Clean & Jerk	Liu Huanhua; China	232 kg WR	Don Opeloge; Samoa	221 kg	Bekdoolot Rasulbekov; Kyrgyzstan	220 kg
Total	Liu Huanhua; China	413 kg WR	Garik Karapetyan; Armenia	401 kg	Yauheni Tsikhantsou; Individual Neutral Athletes	400 kg
109 kg
Snatch	Akbar Djuraev; Uzbekistan	189 kg	Dadash Dadashbayli; Azerbaijan	177 kg	Sharofiddin Amriddinov; Uzbekistan	170 kg
Clean & Jerk	Akbar Djuraev; Uzbekistan	227 kg	Dadash Dadashbayli; Azerbaijan	211 kg	Hernán Viera; Peru	210 kg
Total	Akbar Djuraev; Uzbekistan	416 kg	Dadash Dadashbayli; Azerbaijan	388 kg	Zaza Lomtadze; Georgia	379 kg
+109 kg
Snatch	Varazdat Lalayan; Armenia	210 kg	Ali Davoudi; Iran	202 kg	Ayat Sharifi; Iran	201 kg
Clean & Jerk	Varazdat Lalayan; Armenia	253 kg	Ali Davoudi; Iran	252 kg	Ayat Sharifi; Iran	246 kg
Total	Varazdat Lalayan; Armenia	463 kg	Ali Davoudi; Iran	454 kg	Ayat Sharifi; Iran	447 kg

=== Women ===
Event	Gold		Silver		Bronze	
45 kg
Snatch	Won Hyon-sim; North Korea	87 kg WR	Khổng Mỹ Phượng; Vietnam	76 kg	Sirivimon Pramongkhol; Thailand	75 kg
Clean & Jerk	Won Hyon-sim; North Korea	109 kg WR	Sirivimon Pramongkhol; Thailand	101 kg	Khổng Mỹ Phượng; Vietnam	84 kg
Total	Won Hyon-sim; North Korea	196 kg WR	Sirivimon Pramongkhol; Thailand	176 kg	Khổng Mỹ Phượng; Vietnam	160 kg
49 kg
Snatch	Hou Zhihui; China	97 kg WR	Ri Song-gum; North Korea	97 kg	Jiang Huihua; China	94 kg
Clean & Jerk	Ri Song-gum; North Korea	124 kg	Hou Zhihui; China	120 kg	Jiang Huihua; China	114 kg
Total	Ri Song-gum; North Korea	221 kg WR	Hou Zhihui; China	217 kg	Jiang Huihua; China	208 kg
55 kg
Snatch	Kang Hyon-gyong; North Korea	103 kg	Mihaela Cambei; Romania	91 kg	Josée Gallant; Canada	85 kg
Clean & Jerk	Kang Hyon-gyong; North Korea	131 kg WR	Bindyarani Devi Sorokhaibam; India	113 kg	Mihaela Cambei; Romania	110 kg
Total	Kang Hyon-gyong; North Korea	234 kg WR	Mihaela Cambei; Romania	201 kg	Bindyarani Devi Sorokhaibam; India	196 kg
59 kg
Snatch	Kim Il-gyong; North Korea	108 kg	Luo Shifang; China	108 kg	Maude Charron; Canada	106 kg
Clean & Jerk	Luo Shifang; China	140 kg	Kim Il-gyong; North Korea	132 kg	Pei Xinyi; China	130 kg
Total	Luo Shifang; China	248 kg WR	Kim Il-gyong; North Korea	240 kg	Maude Charron; Canada	236 kg
64 kg
Snatch	Rim Un-sim; North Korea	114 kg	Ri Suk; North Korea	108 kg	Svitlana Samuliak; Ukraine	101 kg
Clean & Jerk	Rim Un-sim; North Korea	144 kg	Ri Suk; North Korea	140 kg	Svitlana Samuliak; Ukraine	120 kg
Total	Rim Un-sim; North Korea	258 kg	Ri Suk; North Korea	248 kg	Svitlana Samuliak; Ukraine	221 kg
71 kg
Snatch	Olivia Reeves; United States	118 kg	Song Kuk-Hyang; North Korea	115 kg	Liao Guifang; China	115 kg
Clean & Jerk	Olivia Reeves; United States	150 kg	Liao Guifang; China	149 kg	Song Kuk-Hyang; North Korea	146 kg
Total	Olivia Reeves; United States	268 kg	Liao Guifang; China	264 kg	Song Kuk-Hyang; North Korea	261 kg
76 kg
Snatch	Marie Fegue; France	115 kg	Jong Chun-hui; North Korea	114 kg	Miyareth Mendoza; Colombia	106 kg
Clean & Jerk	Jong Chun-hui; North Korea	145 kg	Miyareth Mendoza; Colombia	134 kg	Shania Bedward; Canada	132 kg
Total	Jong Chun-hui; North Korea	259 kg	Marie Fegue; France	245 kg	Miyareth Mendoza; Colombia	240 kg
81 kg
Snatch	Neisi Dájomes; Ecuador	123 kg	Wang Zhouyu; China	120 kg	Kim I-seul; South Korea	115 kg
Clean & Jerk	Eileen Cikamatana; Australia	149 kg	Wang Zhouyu; China	147 kg	Neisi Dájomes; Ecuador	146 kg
Total	Neisi Dájomes; Ecuador	269 kg	Wang Zhouyu; China	267 kg	Eileen Cikamatana; Australia	263 kg
87 kg
Snatch	Solfrid Koanda; Norway	123 kg	Kim Yong-ju; North Korea	113 kg	Anastasiia Manievska; Ukraine	105 kg
Clean & Jerk	Solfrid Koanda; Norway	152 kg	Kim Yong-ju; North Korea	145 kg	Anastasiia Manievska; Ukraine	129 kg
Total	Solfrid Koanda; Norway	275 kg	Kim Yong-ju; North Korea	258 kg	Anastasiia Manievska; Ukraine	241 kg
+87 kg
Snatch	Li Wenwen; China	145 kg	Park Hye-jeong; South Korea	130 kg	Son Young-hee; South Korea	122 kg
Clean & Jerk	Li Wenwen; China	180 kg	Park Hye-jeong; South Korea	166 kg	Son Young-hee; South Korea	161 kg
Total	Li Wenwen; China	325 kg	Park Hye-jeong; South Korea	296 kg	Son Young-hee; South Korea	283 kg

== Team ranking ==
=== Men ===
Rank	Team	Points
1	Thailand	408
2	Turkmenistan	359
3	China	340
4	North Korea	310
5	Chinese Taipei	298
6	South Korea	282

=== Women ===
Rank	Team	Points
1	North Korea	713
2	China	584
3	Thailand	463
4	Chinese Taipei	396
5	United States	371
6	South Korea	331

== Participating nations ==
A total of 459 competitors from 110 nations participated.

- Individual Neutral Athletes (5) (Note: As a result of sanctions imposed following the 2022 Russian invasion of Ukraine, Belarusian weightlifters participated as Individual Neutral Athletes (Athlètes Individuels Neutres in French) according to an IOC decision implemented by the IWF. No Russian athlete agreed to participate as neutrals. No flag at all was used for the delegation, not even the IWF flag. The IWF does not include the medals won by these weightlifters in the official medal table, they results does not counted in the team rankings.)
- Albania (2)
- Algeria (1)
- Argentina (1)
- Armenia (5)
- Australia (7)
- Austria (1)
- Azerbaijan (5)
- Bahrain (2)
- Bangladesh (1)
- Belgium (1)
- Botswana (1)
- Brazil (3)
- Brunei (2)
- Bulgaria (3)
- Canada (13)
- Chile (2)
- China (15)
- Cameroon (4)
- Chinese Taipei (16)
- Colombia (7)
- Croatia (1)
- Cuba (5)
- Czech Republic (1)
- Dominican Republic (4)
- Ecuador (6)
- Egypt (6)
- Estonia (1)
- Fiji (1)
- Finland (2)
- France (8)
- United Kingdom（5）
- Georgia (6)
- Germany (6)
- Ghana (1)
- Greece (3)
- Guatemala (2)
- Honduras (3)
- Hungary (2)
- Iceland (1)
- India (2)
- Indonesia (11)
- Iran (5)
- Iraq (1)
- Ireland (4)
- Israel (3)
- Italy (6)
- Jamaica (2)
- Japan (10)
- Jordan (1)
- Kazakhstan (6)
- Kenya (2)
- Kuwait (6)
- Kyrgyzstan (5)
- Latvia (3)
- Lebanon (2)
- Libya (1)
- Lithuania (3)
- Madagascar (2)
- Morocco（3）
- Malaysia (3)
- Malta (2)
- Marshall Islands (1)
- Mauritius (2)
- Mexico (11)
- Moldova (3)
- Mongolia (4)
- Nauru (1)
- Nepal (1)
- Netherlands (2)
- Nigeria (4)
- New Zealand (5)
- Norway (2)
- Oman (2)
- Papua New Guinea (2)
- Peru (4)
- Philippines (7)
- Palestine（1）
- Poland (3)
- North Korea (13)
- Qatar (1)
- Romania (4)
- Samoa (4)
- Saudi Arabia (1)
- Singapore（3）
- Serbia (1)
- Slovakia (6)
- Solomon Islands (2)
- South Africa (7)
- South Korea (15)
- Spain (18)
- Sri Lanka (3)
- Sweden (4)
- Slovakia (1)
- Syria (1)
- Thailand (18)
- Tonga (1)
- Tunisia (2)
- Turkey (5)
- Turkmenistan (11)
- Tuvalu (1)
- Uganda (2)
- Ukraine (4)
- United Arab Emirates (5)
- United States (18)
- Uzbekistan (10)
- Vanuatu (1)
- Venezuela (7)
- Vietnam (9)
- IWF Refugee Team (2) (Note: The team competed under the IWF flag and the Olympic Anthem, and used the country code WRT.)
