= Song Kuk-hyang =

North Korean weightlifter (born 2001)

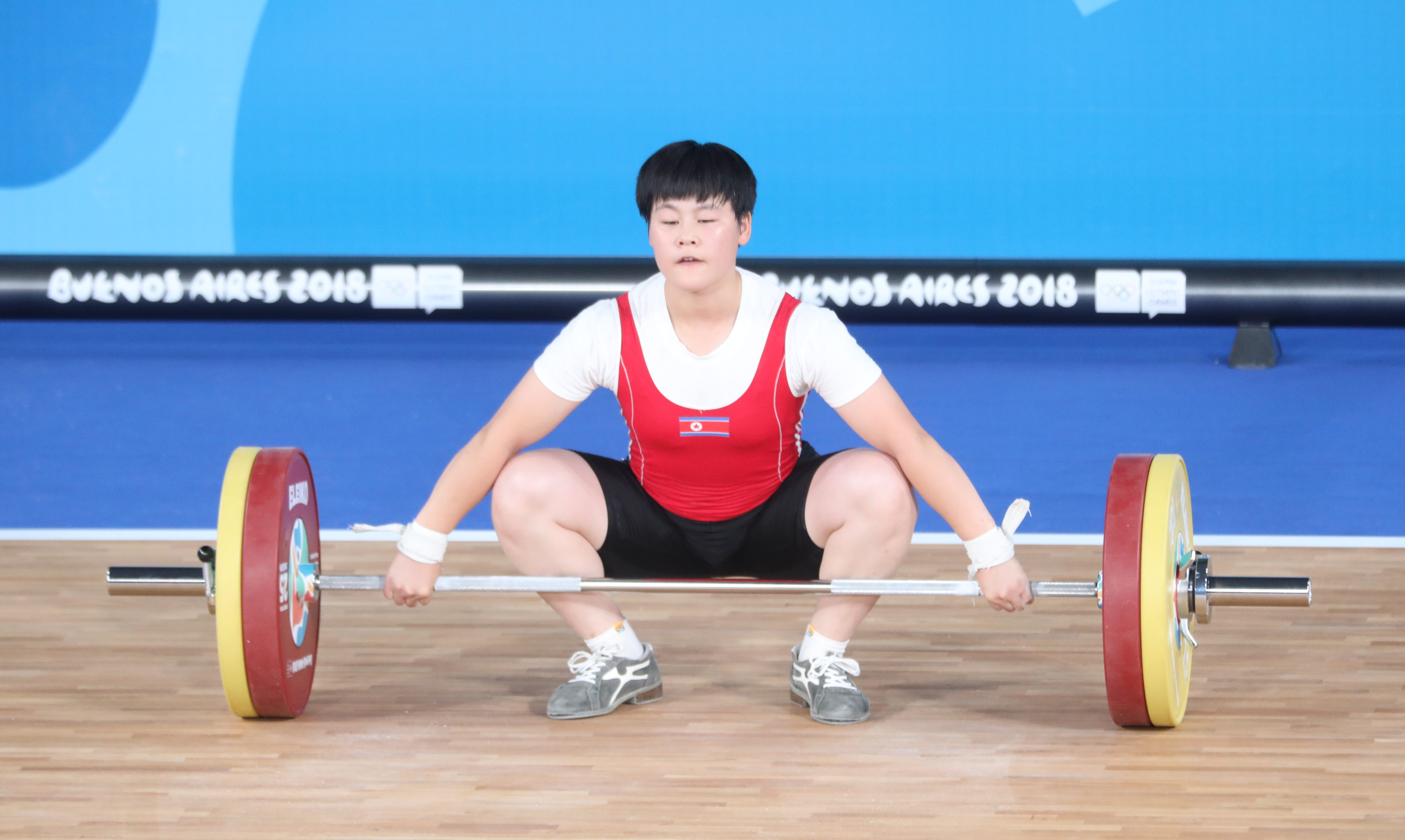
- Song at the 2018 Summer Youth Olympics

Personal information
- Born: 1 February 2001 (age 25)

Sport
- Country: North Korea
- Sport: Weightlifting
- Weight class: 71 kg; 76 kg
Medal record
Women's weightlifting
Representing North Korea
World Championships
Gold medal – first place	2024 Manama	76 kg
Gold medal – first place	2025 Førde	69 kg
Gold medal – first place	2026 Ningbo	69 kg
Asian Games
Gold medal – first place	2022 Hangzhou	76 kg
Gold medal – first place	2026 Aichi–Nagoya	69 kg
Asian Championships
Gold medal – first place	2024 Tashkent	71 kg
Gold medal – first place	2025 Jiangshan	71 kg
Gold medal – first place	2026 Gandhinagar	69 kg

Song Kuk-hyang (born 1 February 2001) is a North Korean weightlifter. She won the gold medal in the women's 76 kg event at the 2024 World Weightlifting Championships held in Bahrain. She also won the gold medal in her event at the 2022 Asian Games held in Hangzhou, China.

In 2018, Song competed in the girls' 63 kg event at the Summer Youth Olympics held in Buenos Aires, Argentina. She did not complete a successful snatch, and did not compete in the clean & jerk.

Song won the gold medal in the women's 71 kg event at the 2024 Asian Weightlifting Championships held in Tashkent, Uzbekistan. She set a new world record of 154 kg in the clean & jerk.

== Achievements ==
Year	Venue	Weight	Snatch (kg)				Clean & jerk (kg)				Total	Rank
Year	Venue	Weight	1	2	3	Rank	1	2	3	Rank	Total	Rank
World Championships
2024	Manama, Bahrain	76 kg	112	~~116~~	116	1st place, gold medalist(s)	141	148	~~153~~	1st place, gold medalist(s)	264	1st place, gold medalist(s)
2025	Førde, Norway	69 kg	112	120 WR	—	1st place, gold medalist(s)	140	150 WR	—	1st place, gold medalist(s)	270 WR	1st place, gold medalist(s)
2026	Ningbo, China	69 kg	~~114~~	114	122 WR	1st place, gold medalist(s)	145	153 WR	—	1st place, gold medalist(s)	275 WR	1st place, gold medalist(s)
Asian Games
2023	Hangzhou, China	76 kg	~~117~~	117	~~121~~	—N/a	140	148	150	—N/a	267	1st place, gold medalist(s)
2026	Nagoya, Japan	69 kg	110	115	121	—N/a	140	152	—	—N/a	273	1st place, gold medalist(s)
Asian Championships
2024	Tashkent, Uzbekistan	71 kg	~~115~~	115	~~122~~	1st place, gold medalist(s)	145	154	—	1st place, gold medalist(s)	269	1st place, gold medalist(s)
2025	Jiangshan, China	71 kg	~~115~~	115	121	2nd place, silver medalist(s)	145	155	—	1st place, gold medalist(s)	276	1st place, gold medalist(s)
