= Julieth Rodríguez =

Colombian weightlifter (born 2002)

Personal information
- Full name: Julieth Alejandra Rodríguez Quintero
- Born: 20 February 2002 (age 24)

Sport
- Country: Colombia
- Sport: Weightlifting
- Weight class: 64 kg; 69 kg; 71 kg

Achievements and titles
- Personal bests: Snatch: 111 kg (2026); Clean & jerk: 137 kg (2026); Total: 247 kg (2026)
Medal record
Representing Colombia
Women's weightlifting
Big (Total)
Event	1st	2nd	3rd
World Championships	0	1	1
Junior World Championships	1	0	0
Pan American Championships	0	3	0
Junior Pan American Games	1	0	0
South American Youth Games	1	0	0
Total	3	4	1
Big and small medals
Event	1st	2nd	3rd
World Championships	0	3	2
Junior World Championships	3	0	0
Pan American Championships	0	9	0
CAC Games	3	0	1
Bolivarian Games	3	1	0
Junior Pan American Games	1	0	0
South American Youth Games	1	0	0
Total	11	13	3
World Championships
Silver medal – second place	2025 Førde	69 kg
Bronze medal – third place	2026 Ningbo	69 kg
Pan American Championships
Silver medal – second place	2022 Bogotá	64 kg
Silver medal – second place	2025 Cali	69 kg
Silver medal – second place	2026 Panama City	69 kg
Central American and Caribbean Games
Gold medal – first place	2023 San Salvador	64 kg S
Gold medal – first place	2026 Santo Domingo	69 kg S
Gold medal – first place	2026 Santo Domingo	69 kg CJ
Bronze medal – third place	2023 San Salvador	64 kg CJ
Bolivarian Games
Gold medal – first place	2022 Valledupar	64 kg CJ
Gold medal – first place	2025 Lima-Ayacucho	69 kg S
Gold medal – first place	2025 Lima-Ayacucho	69 kg CJ
Silver medal – second place	2022 Valledupar	64 kg S
Junior World Championships
Gold medal – first place	2022 Heraklion	64 kg
Junior Pan American Games
Gold medal – first place	2021 Cali-Valle	64 kg
South American Youth Games
Gold medal – first place	2017 Santiago	58 kg

Julieth Alejandra Rodríguez Quintero (born 20 February 2002) is a Colombian weightlifter. She won the silver medal in the women's 64 kg event at the 2022 Pan American Weightlifting Championships held in Bogotá, Colombia. She won two medals, including gold, at the 2022 Bolivarian Games held in Valledupar, Colombia.

In 2021, Rodríguez won the gold medal in the women's 64 kg event at the Junior Pan American Games held in Cali and Valle, Colombia. She also won the gold medal in her event at the 2022 Junior World Weightlifting Championships held in Heraklion, Greece.

== Achievements ==
Year	Venue	Weight	Snatch (kg)				Clean & Jerk (kg)				Total	Rank
Year	Venue	Weight	1	2	3	Rank	1	2	3	Rank	Total	Rank
Representing Colombia
World Championships
2022	Bogotá, Colombia	64 kg	99	~~102~~	~~102~~	4	~~121~~	121	~~124~~	6	220	5
2023	Riyadh, Saudi Arabia	64 kg	99	101	~~103~~	2nd place, silver medalist(s)	~~119~~	119	~~122~~	4	220	4
2024	Manama, Bahrain	71 kg	110	~~114~~	~~115~~	4	128	~~133~~	~~133~~	10	238	5
2025	Førde, Norway	69 kg	107	~~110~~	110	2nd place, silver medalist(s)	131	~~135~~	~~136~~	5	241	2nd place, silver medalist(s)
Pan American Games
2023	Santiago, Chile	71 kg	98	~~102~~	~~102~~	—N/a	115	~~120~~	120	—N/a	218	7
Pan American Championships
2022	Bogotá, Colombia	64 kg	98	101	~~104~~	2nd place, silver medalist(s)	~~123~~	123	~~127~~	2nd place, silver medalist(s)	224	2nd place, silver medalist(s)
2025	Cali, Colombia	69 kg	106	~~110~~	110	2nd place, silver medalist(s)	130	135	~~140~~	2nd place, silver medalist(s)	245	2nd place, silver medalist(s)
2026	Panama City, Panama	69 kg	108	~~111~~	111	2nd place, silver medalist(s)	~~136~~	136	~~141~~	2nd place, silver medalist(s)	247	2nd place, silver medalist(s)
Central American and Caribbean Games
2023	San Salvador, El Salvador	64 kg	98	101	103	1st place, gold medalist(s)	121	~~126~~	~~126~~	3rd place, bronze medalist(s)	—N/a	—N/a
2026	Santo Domingo, Dominican Republic	69 kg	108	111	~~115~~	1st place, gold medalist(s)	132	~~136~~	137	1st place, gold medalist(s)	—N/a	—N/a
Bolivarian Games
2022	Valledupar, Colombia	64 kg	98	~~101~~	102	2nd place, silver medalist(s)	120	125	128	1st place, gold medalist(s)	—N/a	—N/a
2025	Lima, Peru	69 kg	103	107	~~112~~	1st place, gold medalist(s)	126	132	—	1st place, gold medalist(s)	—N/a	—N/a
Junior World Championships
2022	Heraklion, Greece	64 kg	95	97	~~99~~	1st place, gold medalist(s)	117	120	124	1st place, gold medalist(s)	221	1st place, gold medalist(s)
Youth World Championships
2017	Bangkok, Thailand	58 kg	76	~~79~~	~~80~~	13	93	95	~~100~~	12	171	13
Junior Pan American Games
2021	Cali, Colombia	64 kg	95	98	100	1	115	119	121	1	221	1st place, gold medalist(s)
South American Youth Games
2017	Santiago, Chile	58 kg	73	76	~~81~~	1	90	95	~~99~~	1	171	1st place, gold medalist(s)
