= 2025 World Weightlifting Championships =

Weightlifting competition

2025 IWF World Championships
- Venue: Førdehuset
- Location: Førde, Norway
- Dates: 2–11 October
- Competitors: 477 (412) from 87 nations

The 2025 World Weightlifting Championships was a weightlifting competition that took place in Førde, Norway from 2 to 11 October 2025.

Athletes representing the Commonwealth Weightlifting Federation (CWF) compete in the World Championships solely for qualification for the XXIII Commonwealth Games in Glasgow in 2026, and their results are not officially considered valid for the world title. They include England, Wales, Scotland, Northern Ireland, the British Crown Dependencies (Jersey, Guernsey and the Isle of Man) and the British Overseas Territories, under the jurisdiction of the British Weightlifting Federation, but not recognised by the IWF. Belarusian and Russian athletes are participating in the championships under the name Individual Neutral Athletes (AIN) due to sanctions imposed for Russia's invasion of Ukraine. The IWF does not include medals won by weightlifters in the official medal count.

== Schedule ==
All times are local (UTC+2).

Men's events
Date Event	Fri 3		Sat 4		Sun 5			Mon 6				Tue 7			Wed 8	Thu 9		Fri 10					Sat 11
Date Event	12:00	19:30	12:30	17:00	10:00	12:00	19:30	10:00	12:00	17:00	19:30	10:00	12:00	17:00	14:00	14:30	19:30	10:00	12:00	14:30	17:00	19:30	16:00
60 kg	B	A																					
65 kg			B	A																			
71 kg					C	B	A																
79 kg								D	C	B	A												
88 kg												C	B	A									
94 kg															C	B	A						
110 kg																		D	C	B		A	
+110 kg																					B		A

Women's events
Date Event	Thu 2				Fri 3			Sat 4			Sun 5		Mon 6	Tue 7		Wed 8			Thu 9			Sat 11	
Date Event	11:00	13:30	16:00	19:30	10:00	15:00	17:00	10:00	14:30	19:30	14:30	17:00	14:30	14:30	19:30	11:30	17:00	19:30	10:00	12:00	17:00	11:00	13:30
48 kg		C	B	A																			
53 kg	C					B	A																
58 kg					C				B	A													
63 kg								C			B	A											
69 kg													C	B	A								
77 kg																C	B	A					
86 kg																			C	B	A		
+86 kg																						B	A

== Medal table ==
Ranking by Big (Total result) medals

* Host nation (Norway)

Rank	Nation	Gold	Silver	Bronze	Total
1	North Korea	5	3	1	9
2	Colombia	1	1	3	5
3	Thailand	1	1	2	4
4	United States	1	0	2	3
5	China	1	0	1	2
5	South Korea	1	0	1	2
5	Uzbekistan	1	0	1	2
8	Armenia	1	0	0	1
8	Bulgaria	1	0	0	1
8	Indonesia	1	0	0	1
8	Norway*	1	0	0	1
8	Turkey	1	0	0	1
13	Iran	0	2	0	2
14	Bahrain	0	1	1	2
14	Egypt	0	1	1	2
16	Canada	0	1	0	1
16	Cuba	0	1	0	1
16	Dominican Republic	0	1	0	1
16	India	0	1	0	1
16	Japan	0	1	0	1
16	Nigeria	0	1	0	1
16	Romania	0	1	0	1
23	Australia	0	0	1	1
23	Chinese Taipei	0	0	1	1
23	Moldova	0	0	1	1
Totals (25 entries)		16	16	16	48

Ranking by all medals: Big (Total result) and Small (Snatch and Clean & Jerk)

* Host nation (Norway)

Rank	Nation	Gold	Silver	Bronze	Total
1	North Korea	17	5	1	23
2	Thailand	3	2	3	8
3	China	3	1	4	8
4	Armenia	3	1	1	5
5	United States	3	0	6	9
6	South Korea	3	0	3	6
7	Uzbekistan	3	0	2	5
8	Colombia	2	5	5	12
9	Indonesia	2	1	2	5
9	Turkey	2	1	2	5
11	Bulgaria	2	1	0	3
11	Norway*	2	1	0	3
13	Iran	1	4	1	6
14	Romania	1	3	0	4
15	Dominican Republic	1	2	0	3
16	Bahrain	0	4	2	6
16	Egypt	0	4	2	6
18	Cuba	0	3	0	3
18	Nigeria	0	3	0	3
20	Canada	0	2	1	3
20	India	0	2	1	3
20	Japan	0	2	1	3
23	Chile	0	1	0	1
24	Chinese Taipei	0	0	4	4
25	Moldova	0	0	3	3
26	Australia	0	0	2	2
27	France	0	0	1	1
27	Philippines	0	0	1	1
Totals (28 entries)		48	48	48	144

== Medal summary ==
=== Men ===
Event	Gold		Silver		Bronze	
60 kg
Snatch	Wang Hao; China	138 kg	Yuan Hao; China	132 kg JWR	Theerapong Silachai; Thailand	129 kg
Clean & Jerk	Theerapong Silachai; Thailand	170 kg	Pang Un-chol; North Korea	168 kg	Wang Hao; China	164 kg
Total	Wang Hao; China	302 kg	Theerapong Silachai; Thailand	299 kg	Pang Un-chol; North Korea	295 kg
65 kg
Snatch	Muhammed Furkan Özbek; Turkey	145 kg ER	Ivan Dimov; Bulgaria	137 kg	Eko Yuli Irawan; Indonesia	137 kg
Clean & Jerk	Pak Myong-jin; North Korea	180 kg	Muhammed Furkan Özbek; Turkey	179 kg ER	Hampton Morris; United States	178 kg
Total	Muhammed Furkan Özbek; Turkey	324 kg WR	Pak Myong-jin; North Korea	315 kg	Hampton Morris; United States	311 kg
71 kg
Snatch	He Yueji; China	160 kg WR	Gor Sahakyan; Armenia	154 kg ER	Masanori Miyamoto; Japan	152 kg
Clean & Jerk	Weeraphon Wichuma; Thailand	194 kg WR	Masanori Miyamoto; Japan	193 kg	Yusuf Fehmi Genç; Turkey	192 kg ER
Total	Weeraphon Wichuma; Thailand	346 kg WR	Masanori Miyamoto; Japan	345 kg	He Yueji; China	344 kg
79 kg
Snatch	Ri Chong-song; North Korea	163 kg	Abdelrahman Younes; Egypt	162 kg AF	Rizki Juniansyah; Indonesia	157 kg
Clean & Jerk	Rizki Juniansyah; Indonesia	204 kg WR	Rahmat Erwin Abdullah; Indonesia	203 kg	Son Hyeon-ho; South Korea	198 kg
Total	Rizki Juniansyah; Indonesia	361 kg	Ri Chong-song; North Korea	360 kg	Abdelrahman Younes; Egypt	360 kg AF
88 kg
Snatch	Yeison López; Colombia	177 kg WR	Arley Méndez; Chile	172 kg	Marin Robu; Moldova	169 kg
Clean & Jerk	Ro Kwang-ryol; North Korea	215 kg WR	Yeison López; Colombia	210 kg AM	Marin Robu; Moldova	200 kg
Total	Yeison López; Colombia	387 kg WR	Ro Kwang-ryol; North Korea	377 kg	Marin Robu; Moldova	369 kg
94 kg
Snatch	Alireza Moeini; Iran	182 kg WR	Ali Alipour; Iran	176 kg	Jokser Albornoz; Colombia	175 kg
Clean & Jerk	Karlos Nasar; Bulgaria	222 kg WR	Jokser Albornoz; Colombia	215 kg AM	Romain Imadouchène; France	211 kg
Total	Karlos Nasar; Bulgaria	395 kg ER	Alireza Moeini; Iran	391 kg	Jokser Albornoz; Colombia	390 kg AM
110 kg
Snatch	Akbar Djuraev; Uzbekistan	196 kg WR	Luis Lauret; Romania	188 kg	Garik Karapetyan; Armenia	187 kg
Clean & Jerk	Akbar Djuraev; Uzbekistan	232 kg	Alireza Nassiri; Iran	231 kg JWR	Ruslan Nurudinov; Uzbekistan	228 kg
Total	Akbar Djuraev; Uzbekistan	428 kg WR	Alireza Nassiri; Iran	415 kg JWR	Ruslan Nurudinov; Uzbekistan	414 kg
+110 kg
Snatch	Varazdat Lalayan; Armenia	211 kg	Gor Minasyan; Bahrain	205 kg	Ali Davoudi; Iran	196 kg
Clean & Jerk	Varazdat Lalayan; Armenia	250 kg	Gor Minasyan; Bahrain	242 kg	Song Yeong-hwan; South Korea	235 kg
Total	Varazdat Lalayan; Armenia	461 kg	Gor Minasyan; Bahrain	447 kg	Song Yeong-hwan; South Korea	410 kg

=== Women ===
Event	Gold		Silver		Bronze	
48 kg
Snatch	Ri Song-gum; North Korea	91 kg	Thanyathon Sukcharoen; Thailand	88 kg	Mirabai Chanu; India	84 kg
Clean & Jerk	Ri Song-gum; North Korea	122 kg WR	Mirabai Chanu; India	115 kg	Li Shumiao; China	111 kg
Total	Ri Song-gum; North Korea	213 kg WR	Mirabai Chanu; India	199 kg	Thanyathon Sukcharoen; Thailand	198 kg
53 kg
Snatch	Mihaela Cambei; Romania	94 kg ER	Kang Hyon-gyong; North Korea	93 kg	Cansel Özkan; Turkey	93 kg
Clean & Jerk	Kang Hyon-gyong; North Korea	121 kg	Mihaela Cambei; Romania	114 kg	Chen Guan-ling; Chinese Taipei	113 kg
Total	Kang Hyon-gyong; North Korea	214 kg	Mihaela Cambei; Romania	208 kg ER	Surodchana Khambao; Thailand	200 kg
58 kg
Snatch	Kim Il-gyong; North Korea	104 kg	Rafiatu Lawal; Nigeria	101 kg AF	Miranda Ulrey; United States	98 kg
Clean & Jerk	Kim Il-gyong; North Korea	132 kg	Rafiatu Lawal; Nigeria	128 kg AF	Kuo Hsing-chun; Chinese Taipei	128 kg
Total	Kim Il-gyong; North Korea	236 kg WR	Rafiatu Lawal; Nigeria	229 kg AF	Kuo Hsing-chun; Chinese Taipei	224 kg
63 kg
Snatch	Ri Suk; North Korea	111 kg WR	Yenny Sinisterra; Colombia	103 kg	Maude Charron; Canada	103 kg
Clean & Jerk	Ri Suk; North Korea	142 kg WR	Maude Charron; Canada	133 kg AM	Elreen Ando; Philippines	131 kg
Total	Ri Suk; North Korea	253 kg WR	Maude Charron; Canada	236 kg	Yenny Sinisterra; Colombia	231 kg
69 kg
Snatch	Song Kuk-hyang; North Korea	120 kg WR	Julieth Rodríguez; Colombia	110 kg	Ingrid Segura; Bahrain	107 kg AJR
Clean & Jerk	Song Kuk-hyang; North Korea	150 kg WR	Ingrid Segura; Bahrain	134 kg	Chen Wen-huei; Chinese Taipei	132 kg
Total	Song Kuk-hyang; North Korea	270 kg WR	Julieth Rodríguez; Colombia	241 kg	Ingrid Segura; Bahrain	241 kg AJR
77 kg
Snatch	Olivia Reeves; United States	123 kg WR	Sara Ahmed; Egypt	112 kg	Mari Sánchez; Colombia	112 kg
Clean & Jerk	Olivia Reeves; United States	155 kg WR	Sara Ahmed; Egypt	140 kg	Mattie Rogers; United States	140 kg
Total	Olivia Reeves; United States	278 kg WR	Sara Ahmed; Egypt	252 kg	Mari Sánchez; Colombia	248 kg
86 kg
Snatch	Yudelina Mejía; Dominican Republic	122 kg	Solfrid Koanda; Norway	120 kg ER	Rahma Ahmed; Egypt	115 kg
Clean & Jerk	Solfrid Koanda; Norway	152 kg ER	Yudelina Mejía; Dominican Republic	149 kg	Eileen Cikamatana; Australia	140 kg
Total	Solfrid Koanda; Norway	272 kg ER	Yudelina Mejía; Dominican Republic	271 kg AM	Eileen Cikamatana; Australia	252 kg
+86 kg
Snatch	Park Hye-jeong; South Korea	125 kg	Marifélix Sarría; Cuba	118 kg	Zhu Linhan; China	116 kg
Clean & Jerk	Park Hye-jeong; South Korea	158 kg	Marifélix Sarría; Cuba	157 kg	Mary Theisen-Lappen; United States	154 kg
Total	Park Hye-jeong; South Korea	283 kg	Marifélix Sarría; Cuba	275 kg	Mary Theisen-Lappen; United States	269 kg

== Team ranking ==
=== Men ===
Rank	Team	Points
1	Iran	387
2	North Korea	354
3	United States	318
4	Chinese Taipei	305
5	Indonesia	296
6	Japan	282

=== Women ===
Rank	Team	Points
1	United States	438
2	North Korea	417
3	Chinese Taipei	406
4	Canada	343
5	China	325
6	Mexico	316

== Participating countries ==
A total of 477 competitors from 87 nations participated.

- Albania (3)
- Argentina (2)
- Armenia (7)
- Australia (5)
- Austria (2)
- Azerbaijan (4)
- Bahrain (2)
- Belgium (4)
- Bosnia and Herzegovina (1)
- Botswana (1)
- Brazil (6)
- Bulgaria (6)
- Cameroon (4)
- Canada (13)
- Chile (5)
- China (11)
- Chinese Taipei (16)
- Colombia (9)
- Croatia (2)
- Cuba (2)
- Cyprus (2)
- Czech Republic (6)
- Denmark (7)
- Dominican Republic (3)
- Ecuador (4)
- Egypt (5)
- Finland (7)
- France (5)
- Georgia (2)
- Germany (8)
- Ghana (1)
- Great Britain (8)
- Hong Kong (1)
- Hungary (2)
- Iceland (5)
- India (11)
- Indonesia (10)
- Iran (8)
- Ireland (5)
- Israel (3)
- Italy (6)
- Japan (13)
- Jordan (1)
- Kazakhstan (4)
- Kenya (8)
- Kosovo (1)
- Kuwait (11)
- Latvia (3)
- Lithuania (6)
- Luxembourg (1)
- Malaysia (4)
- Malta (3)
- Mexico (16)
- Moldova (1)
- Morocco (5)
- Netherlands (1)
- New Zealand (7)
- Nigeria (1)
- North Korea (10)
- Northern Mariana Islands (1)
- Norway (13)
- Palestine (1)
- Peru (5)
- Philippines (5)
- Poland (1)
- Romania (5)
- Saudi Arabia (1)
- Serbia (1)
- Slovakia (3)
- South Africa (1)
- South Korea (14)
- Spain (10)
- Sweden (1)
- Switzerland (1)
- Thailand (6)
- Tonga (2)
- Tunisia (2)
- Turkey (11)
- Uganda (1)
- Ukraine (9)
- United Arab Emirates (5)
- United States (16)
- Uzbekistan (2)
- Vanuatu (1)
- Commonwealth Weightlifting Federation (36)
- Individual Neutral Athletes (10)
- Weightlifting Refugee Team (3)

== See also ==
- List of World Championships medalists in weightlifting (men)
- List of World Championships medalists in weightlifting (women)
