= 2024 Asian Weightlifting Championships =

- Host city: Tashkent, Uzbekistan
- Dates: 3–10 February 2024
- Main venue: Yunusabad Sports Complex

The 2024 Asian Weightlifting Championships were held at Yunusabad Sports Complex, Tashkent, Uzbekistan, from 3 to 10 February 2024.

== Medal summary ==
=== Men ===
Event	Gold		Silver		Bronze	
55 kg
Snatch	Natthawat Chomchuen; Thailand	119 kg	Pang Un-chol; North Korea	116 kg	Lại Gia Thành; Vietnam	116 kg
Clean & Jerk	Pang Un-chol; North Korea	150 kg	Natthawat Chomchuen; Thailand	145 kg	Witoon Mingmoon; Thailand	135 kg
Total	Pang Un-chol; North Korea	266 kg	Natthawat Chomchuen; Thailand	264 kg	Lại Gia Thành; Vietnam	250 kg
61 kg
Snatch	Pak Myong-jin; North Korea	134 kg	Lee Hye-seong; South Korea	131 kg	Ricko Saputra; Indonesia	130 kg
Clean & Jerk	Pak Myong-jin; North Korea	172 kg	Ricko Saputra; Indonesia	161 kg	Trịnh Văn Vinh; Vietnam	161 kg
Total	Pak Myong-jin; North Korea	306 kg	Ricko Saputra; Indonesia	291 kg	Trịnh Văn Vinh; Vietnam	290 kg
67 kg
Snatch	Ri Won-ju; North Korea	137 kg	Teerawat Ratphet; Thailand	128 kg	Elyas Al-Busaidi; Oman	127 kg
Clean & Jerk	Ri Won-ju; North Korea	180 kg	Sairamkez Akmolda; Kazakhstan	166 kg	Hu Jyun-siang; Chinese Taipei	164 kg
Total	Ri Won-ju; North Korea	317 kg	Sairamkez Akmolda; Kazakhstan	292 kg	Teerawat Ratphet; Thailand	286 kg
73 kg
Snatch	Rahmat Erwin Abdullah; Indonesia	159 kg	Rizki Juniansyah; Indonesia	158 kg	Masanori Miyamoto; Japan	150 kg
Clean & Jerk	Rahmat Erwin Abdullah; Indonesia	204 kg WR	Rizki Juniansyah; Indonesia	195 kg	Bak Joo-hyo; South Korea	186 kg
Total	Rahmat Erwin Abdullah; Indonesia	363 kg	Rizki Juniansyah; Indonesia	353 kg	Masanori Miyamoto; Japan	335 kg
81 kg
Snatch	Ri Chong-song; North Korea	169 kg	Abdollah Beiranvand; Iran	154 kg	Alexandr Uvarov; Kazakhstan	153 kg
Clean & Jerk	Ri Chong-song; North Korea	200 kg	Alexandr Uvarov; Kazakhstan	190 kg	Gaýgysyz Töräýew; Turkmenistan	189 kg
Total	Ri Chong-song; North Korea	369 kg	Alexandr Uvarov; Kazakhstan	343 kg	Gaýgysyz Töräýew; Turkmenistan	337 kg
89 kg
Snatch	Sarvarbek Zafarjonov; Uzbekistan	167 kg	Ali Alipour; Iran	163 kg	Emil Moldodosov; Kyrgyzstan	162 kg
Clean & Jerk	Yu Dong-ju; South Korea	201 kg	Ali Alipour; Iran	200 kg	Amur Al-Khanjari; Oman	196 kg
Total	Ali Alipour; Iran	363 kg	Sarvarbek Zafarjonov; Uzbekistan	362 kg	Emil Moldodosov; Kyrgyzstan	352 kg
96 kg
Snatch	Won Jong-beom; South Korea	162 kg	Sunnatilla Usarov; Uzbekistan	161 kg	Kirill Staroverkin; Kazakhstan	150 kg
Clean & Jerk	Won Jong-beom; South Korea	205 kg	Sunnatilla Usarov; Uzbekistan	185 kg	Nursultan Tarmalov; Kyrgyzstan	184 kg
Total	Won Jong-beom; South Korea	367 kg	Sunnatilla Usarov; Uzbekistan	346 kg	Nursultan Tarmalov; Kyrgyzstan	333 kg
102 kg
Snatch	Akbar Djuraev; Uzbekistan	180 kg	Chen Po-jen; Chinese Taipei	176 kg	Jang Yeon-hak; South Korea	175 kg
Clean & Jerk	Akbar Djuraev; Uzbekistan	220 kg	Bekdoolot Rasulbekov; Kyrgyzstan	213 kg	Chen Po-jen; Chinese Taipei	206 kg
Total	Akbar Djuraev; Uzbekistan	400 kg	Bekdoolot Rasulbekov; Kyrgyzstan	386 kg	Chen Po-jen; Chinese Taipei	382 kg
109 kg
Snatch	Sharofiddin Amriddinov; Uzbekistan	176 kg	Ruslan Nurudinov; Uzbekistan	175 kg	Ezzeddin Al-Ghafeer; United Arab Emirates	167 kg
Clean & Jerk	Ruslan Nurudinov; Uzbekistan	207 kg	Sharofiddin Amriddinov; Uzbekistan	205 kg	Ezzeddin Al-Ghafeer; United Arab Emirates	201 kg
Total	Ruslan Nurudinov; Uzbekistan	382 kg	Sharofiddin Amriddinov; Uzbekistan	381 kg	Ezzeddin Al-Ghafeer; United Arab Emirates	368 kg
+109 kg
Snatch	Gor Minasyan; Bahrain	207 kg	Man Asaad; Syria	192 kg	Rustam Djangabaev; Uzbekistan	192 kg
Clean & Jerk	Man Asaad; Syria	252 kg AR	Gor Minasyan; Bahrain	236 kg	Ali Ammar; Iraq	234 kg
Total	Man Asaad; Syria	444 kg	Gor Minasyan; Bahrain	443 kg	Ali Ammar; Iraq	425 kg

=== Women ===
Event	Gold		Silver		Bronze	
45 kg
Snatch	Won Hyon-sim; North Korea	86 kg WR	Sirivimon Pramongkhol; Thailand	72 kg	Hong Zi-yu; Chinese Taipei	72 kg
Clean & Jerk	Won Hyon-sim; North Korea	106 kg	Sirivimon Pramongkhol; Thailand	91 kg	Hong Zi-yu; Chinese Taipei	90 kg
Total	Won Hyon-sim; North Korea	192 kg WR	Sirivimon Pramongkhol; Thailand	163 kg	Hong Zi-yu; Chinese Taipei	162 kg
49 kg
Snatch	Ri Song-gum; North Korea	95 kg	Rosegie Ramos; Philippines	88 kg	Surodchana Khambao; Thailand	84 kg
Clean & Jerk	Ri Song-gum; North Korea	125 kg WR	Rira Suzuki; Japan	109 kg	Surodchana Khambao; Thailand	106 kg
Total	Ri Song-gum; North Korea	220 kg WR	Rira Suzuki; Japan	191 kg	Rosegie Ramos; Philippines	190 kg
55 kg
Snatch	Kang Hyon-gyong; North Korea	104 kg WR	Chen Guan-ling; Chinese Taipei	89 kg	Nigora Abdullaeva; Uzbekistan	86 kg
Clean & Jerk	Kang Hyon-gyong; North Korea	123 kg	Chen Guan-ling; Chinese Taipei	115 kg	Nigora Abdullaeva; Uzbekistan	106 kg
Total	Kang Hyon-gyong; North Korea	227 kg	Chen Guan-ling; Chinese Taipei	204 kg	Nigora Abdullaeva; Uzbekistan	192 kg
59 kg
Snatch	Kim Il-gyong; North Korea	103 kg	Natasya Beteyob; Indonesia	96 kg	Thanaporn Saetia; Thailand	96 kg
Clean & Jerk	Kim Il-gyong; North Korea	122 kg	Elreen Ando; Philippines	120 kg	Natasya Beteyob; Indonesia	116 kg
Total	Kim Il-gyong; North Korea	225 kg	Elreen Ando; Philippines	213 kg	Natasya Beteyob; Indonesia	212 kg
64 kg
Snatch	Ri Suk; North Korea	112 kg	Ganzorigiin Anuujin; Mongolia	90 kg	Han Ji-an; South Korea	88 kg
Clean & Jerk	Ri Suk; North Korea	141 kg	Li Wei-chia; Chinese Taipei	118 kg	Park Min-kyung; South Korea	116 kg
Total	Ri Suk; North Korea	253 kg	Li Wei-chia; Chinese Taipei	203 kg	Park Min-kyung; South Korea	202 kg
71 kg
Snatch	Song Kuk-hyang; North Korea	115 kg	Chen Wen-huei; Chinese Taipei	108 kg	Mun Min-hee; South Korea	102 kg
Clean & Jerk	Song Kuk-hyang; North Korea	154 kg WR	Runa Segawa; Japan	130 kg	Mun Min-hee; South Korea	129 kg
Total	Song Kuk-hyang; North Korea	269 kg	Chen Wen-huei; Chinese Taipei	236 kg	Mun Min-hee; South Korea	231 kg
76 kg
Snatch	Jong Chun-hui; North Korea	111 kg	Tatiana Melnichenko; Kyrgyzstan	97 kg	Otgonchimegiin Tögs-Erdene; Mongolia	97 kg
Clean & Jerk	Jong Chun-hui; North Korea	125 kg	Elaheh Razzaghi; Iran	124 kg	Mahassen Fattouh; Lebanon	122 kg
Total	Jong Chun-hui; North Korea	236 kg	Elaheh Razzaghi; Iran	220 kg	Tatiana Melnichenko; Kyrgyzstan	219 kg
81 kg
Snatch	Kim Su-hyeon; South Korea	110 kg	Rigina Adashbaeva; Uzbekistan	107 kg	Anamjan Rustamowa; Turkmenistan	105 kg
Clean & Jerk	Kim Su-hyeon; South Korea	144 kg	Rigina Adashbaeva; Uzbekistan	136 kg	Kim I-seul; South Korea	133 kg
Total	Kim Su-hyeon; South Korea	254 kg	Rigina Adashbaeva; Uzbekistan	243 kg	Kim I-seul; South Korea	238 kg
87 kg
Snatch	Nigora Suvonova; Uzbekistan	101 kg	Yun Ha-je; South Korea	100 kg	Kijan Maghsoudi; Iran	96 kg
Clean & Jerk	Yun Ha-je; South Korea	130 kg	Nigora Suvonova; Uzbekistan	128 kg	Kijan Maghsoudi; Iran	117 kg
Total	Yun Ha-je; South Korea	230 kg	Nigora Suvonova; Uzbekistan	229 kg	Kijan Maghsoudi; Iran	213 kg
+87 kg
Snatch	Park Hye-jeong; South Korea	128 kg	Son Young-hee; South Korea	127 kg	Tursunoy Jabborova; Uzbekistan	116 kg
Clean & Jerk	Park Hye-jeong; South Korea	165 kg	Son Young-hee; South Korea	160 kg	Nurul Akmal; Indonesia	149 kg
Total	Park Hye-jeong; South Korea	293 kg	Son Young-hee; South Korea	287 kg	Nurul Akmal; Indonesia	259 kg

== Medal table ==
Ranking by Big (Total result) medals

Rank	Nation	Gold	Silver	Bronze	Total
1	North Korea	11	0	0	11
2	South Korea	4	1	3	8
3	Uzbekistan	2	5	1	8
4	Indonesia	1	2	2	5
5	Iran	1	1	1	3
6	Syria	1	0	0	1
7	Chinese Taipei	0	3	2	5
8	Thailand	0	2	1	3
9	Kazakhstan	0	2	0	2
10	Kyrgyzstan	0	1	3	4
11	Japan	0	1	1	2
11	Philippines	0	1	1	2
13	Bahrain	0	1	0	1
14	Vietnam	0	0	2	2
15	Iraq	0	0	1	1
15	Turkmenistan	0	0	1	1
15	United Arab Emirates	0	0	1	1
Totals (17 entries)		20	20	20	60

Ranking by all medals: Big (Total result) and Small (Snatch and Clean & Jerk)

Rank	Nation	Gold	Silver	Bronze	Total
1	North Korea	32	1	0	33
2	South Korea	12	5	10	27
3	Uzbekistan	8	12	5	25
4	Indonesia	3	6	5	14
5	Syria	2	1	0	3
6	Thailand	1	6	5	12
7	Iran	1	5	3	9
8	Bahrain	1	2	0	3
9	Chinese Taipei	0	8	6	14
10	Kazakhstan	0	4	2	6
11	Kyrgyzstan	0	3	5	8
12	Japan	0	3	2	5
13	Philippines	0	3	1	4
14	Mongolia	0	1	1	2
15	Vietnam	0	0	4	4
16	Turkmenistan	0	0	3	3
16	United Arab Emirates	0	0	3	3
18	Iraq	0	0	2	2
18	Oman	0	0	2	2
20	Lebanon	0	0	1	1
Totals (20 entries)		60	60	60	180

== Team ranking ==
=== Men ===
Rank	Team	Points
1	Uzbekistan	692
2	South Korea	432
3	Chinese Taipei	429
4	North Korea	333
5	Kazakhstan	328
6	Kyrgyzstan	309

=== Women ===
Rank	Team	Points
1	South Korea	635
2	Uzbekistan	631
3	Chinese Taipei	597
4	North Korea	588
5	Indonesia	383
6	Philippines	257
