= Miyareth Mendoza =

Colombian weightlifter (born 1994)

Personal information
- Full name: Miyareth Mendoza Carabali
- Born: 6 April 1994 (age 32)

Sport
- Country: Colombia
- Sport: Weightlifting
Medal record
Women's weightlifting
Representing Colombia
World Championships
Silver medal – second place	2024 Manama	76 kg
Bronze medal – third place	2017 Anaheim	69 kg
IWF World Cup
Bronze medal – third place	2024 Phuket	76 kg
Pan American Championships
Silver medal – second place	2021 Guayaquil	71 kg
South American Games
Silver medal – second place	2018 Cochabamba	69 kg
Bolivarian Games
Gold medal – first place	2017 Santa Marta	69 kg
Gold medal – first place	2017 Santa Marta	69 kg S
Gold medal – first place	2017 Santa Marta	69 kg CJ
Silver medal – second place	2022 Valledupar	71 kg CJ
Bronze medal – third place	2022 Valledupar	71 kg S

Miyareth Mendoza Carabali (born 6 April 1994) is a Colombian weightlifter. She won the silver medal in the women's 76 kg event at the 2024 World Weightlifting Championships held in Bahrain. In 2017, she won the bronze medal in the women's 69 kg event at the World Weightlifting Championships held in Anaheim, United States. At the time, she finished in 4th place but this became the bronze medal after Romela Begaj of Albania tested positive for a banned substance.

Mendoza won the silver medal in the women's 71 kg event at the 2021 Pan American Weightlifting Championships held in Guayaquil, Ecuador.
