= Weightlifting at the 2022 Asian Games – Women's 76 kg =

Women's 76 kg at the 2022 Asian Games
- Venue: Xiaoshan Sports Center Gymnasium
- Date: 5 October 2023
- Competitors: 12 from 10 nations

Medalists
gold medal	Song Kuk-hyang	North Korea
silver medal	Jong Chun-hui	North Korea
bronze medal	Kim Su-hyeon	South Korea

The women's 76 kilograms competition at the 2022 Asian Games took place on 5 October 2023 at Xiaoshan Sports Center Gymnasium.

== Schedule ==
All times are China Standard Time (UTC+08:00)

Date	Time	Event
Thursday, 5 October 2023	19:00	Group A

== Records ==
Prior to this competition, the existing world, Asian and Games records were as follows.

World Record	Snatch	Rim Jong-sim (PRK)	124 kg	Pattaya, Thailand	24 September 2019
World Record	Clean & Jerk	Zhang Wangli (CHN)	156 kg	Fuzhou, China	26 February 2019
World Record	Total	Rim Jong-sim (PRK)	278 kg	Ningbo, China	26 April 2019
Asian Record	Snatch	Rim Jong-sim (PRK)	124 kg	Pattaya, Thailand	24 September 2019
Asian Record	Clean & Jerk	Zhang Wangli (CHN)	156 kg	Fuzhou, China	26 February 2019
Asian Record	Total	Rim Jong-sim (PRK)	278 kg	Ningbo, China	26 April 2019
Games Record	Snatch	Asian Games Standard	120 kg	—	1 November 2018
Games Record	Clean & Jerk	Asian Games Standard	151 kg	—	1 November 2018
Games Record	Total	Asian Games Standard	268 kg	—	1 November 2018

== Results ==
Legend

- NM — No mark

Rank	Athlete	Group	Snatch (kg)				Clean & Jerk (kg)				Total
Rank	Athlete	Group	1	2	3	Result	1	2	3	Result	Total
1st place, gold medalist(s)	Song Kuk-hyang (PRK)	A	~~117~~	117	~~121~~	117	140	148	150	150	267
2nd place, silver medalist(s)	Jong Chun-hui (PRK)	A	113	117	~~119~~	117	135	143	149	149	266
3rd place, bronze medalist(s)	Kim Su-hyeon (KOR)	A	105	~~109~~	~~109~~	105	132	136	138	138	243
4	Chen Wen-huei (TPE)	A	101	~~105~~	105	105	131	~~135~~	137	137	242
5	Vanessa Sarno (PHI)	A	100	105	~~108~~	105	130	~~136~~	~~136~~	130	235
6	Aisha Omarova (KAZ)	A	93	~~97~~	98	98	119	123	~~126~~	123	221
7	Tatiana Melnichenko (KGZ)	A	90	95	~~100~~	95	115	~~121~~	123	123	218
8	Aray Nurlybekova (KAZ)	A	94	~~98~~	98	98	115	~~123~~	~~125~~	115	213
9	Elaheh Razzaghi (IRI)	A	89	93	~~97~~	93	~~113~~	113	~~120~~	113	206
10	Gombosürengiin Enerel (MGL)	A	~~84~~	84	~~86~~	84	~~111~~	~~111~~	111	111	195
—	Siriyakorn Khaipandung (THA)	A	~~106~~	~~106~~	~~106~~	—	—	—	—	—	NM
—	Liao Guifang (CHN)	A	113	~~118~~	—	113	—	—	—	—	NM
