= Weightlifting at the 2026 Asian Games – Women's 69 kg =

Women's 69 kg at the 2026 Asian Games
- Venue: Nagoya Trade & Industry Center
- Date: 27 September 2026
- Competitors: 10 from 10 nations

Medalists
| gold medal | Song Kuk-hyang | North Korea |
| silver medal | Chen Wen-huei | Chinese Taipei |
| bronze medal | Ingrid Segura | Bahrain |

The women's 69 kilograms competition at the 2026 Asian Games was held on 27 September 2026 at the Nagoya Trade & Industry Center.

== Schedule ==
All times are Japan Standard Time (UTC+09:00)

| Date | Time | Event |
|---|---|---|
| Sunday, 27 September 2026 | 13:30 | Group A |

== Records ==
Prior to this competition, the existing world, Asian and Games records were as follows.

| World Record | Snatch | Song Kuk-hyang (PRK) | 120 kg | Førde, Norway | 7 October 2025 |
| World Record | Clean & Jerk | Song Kuk-hyang (PRK) | 151 kg | Gandhinagar, India | 15 May 2026 |
| World Record | Total | Song Kuk-hyang (PRK) | 270 kg | Førde, Norway | 7 October 2025 |
| Asian Record | Snatch | Song Kuk-hyang (PRK) | 120 kg | Førde, Norway | 7 October 2025 |
| Asian Record | Clean & Jerk | Song Kuk-hyang (PRK) | 151 kg | Gandhinagar, India | 15 May 2026 |
| Asian Record | Total | Song Kuk-hyang (PRK) | 270 kg | Førde, Norway | 7 October 2025 |
| Games Record | Snatch | Asian Games Standard | 113 kg | — | 1 August 2026 |
| Games Record | Clean & Jerk | Asian Games Standard | 142 kg | — | 1 August 2026 |
| Games Record | Total | Asian Games Standard | 253 kg | — | 1 August 2026 |

== Results ==
| Rank | Athlete | Group | Snatch (kg) | | | | Clean & Jerk (kg) | | | | Total |
| Rank | Athlete | Group | 1 | 2 | 3 | Result | 1 | 2 | 3 | Result | Total |
|---|---|---|---|---|---|---|---|---|---|---|---|
| 1st place, gold medalist(s) | Song Kuk-hyang (PRK) | A | 110 | 115 | 121 | 121 | 140 | 152 | — | 152 | 273 |
| 2nd place, silver medalist(s) | Chen Wen-huei (TPE) | A | 100 | 103 | 106 | 106 | 126 | ~~130~~ | ~~130~~ | 126 | 232 |
| 3rd place, bronze medalist(s) | Ingrid Segura (BRN) | A | 95 | 98 | 101 | 101 | 123 | 128 | ~~133~~ | 128 | 229 |
| 4 | Kristel Macrohon (PHI) | A | 98 | 100 | 102 | 102 | ~~124~~ | ~~125~~ | 125 | 125 | 227 |
| 5 | Indah Afriza (INA) | A | 93 | ~~97~~ | 97 | 97 | 121 | ~~126~~ | 126 | 126 | 223 |
| 6 | Yui Miyagoe (JPN) | A | 90 | 95 | 99 | 99 | 114 | 120 | ~~124~~ | 120 | 219 |
| 7 | Aray Nurlybekova (KAZ) | A | 90 | 94 | 98 | 98 | 112 | 118 | ~~122~~ | 118 | 216 |
| 8 | Boldbaataryn Khongorzul (MGL) | A | 90 | 95 | ~~99~~ | 95 | 119 | ~~124~~ | ~~125~~ | 119 | 214 |
| 9 | Harjinder Kaur (IND) | A | 94 | ~~97~~ | ~~97~~ | 94 | 110 | — | — | 110 | 204 |
| 10 | Alexa Mina (LBN) | A | 82 | 85 | 88 | 88 | 102 | ~~105~~ | ~~105~~ | 102 | 190 |

== New records ==
The following records were established during the competition.

| Snatch | 115 | Song Kuk-hyang (PRK) | GR |
| Snatch | 121 | Song Kuk-hyang (PRK) | WR |
| Clean & Jerk | 152 | Song Kuk-hyang (PRK) | WR |
| Total | 261 | Song Kuk-hyang (PRK) | GR |
| Total | 273 | Song Kuk-hyang (PRK) | WR |
