= Phuket Rajabhat University =

Coordinates: 7.912°N 98.386°E

Phuket Rajabhat University (PKRU; Thai: มหาวิทยาลัยราชภัฏภูเก็ต, pronounced: raj-cha-pat-pu-get) is a university in Thailand.
