= 2025 World Weightlifting Championships – Women's 69 kg =

Women's 69 kg at the 2025 World Weightlifting Championships
- Venue: Førdehuset
- Location: Førde, Norway
- Dates: 6 and 7 October
- Winning total: 270 kg CWR

Medalists
gold medal	Song Kuk-hyang	North Korea
silver medal	Julieth Rodríguez	Colombia
bronze medal	Ingrid Segura	Bahrain

The women's 69 kilograms competition at the 2025 World Weightlifting Championships was held on 6 and 7 October 2025.

== Schedule ==
Date	Time	Event
6 October 2025	14:30	Group C
7 October 2025	14:30	Group B
7 October 2025	19:30	Group A

== Records ==
Prior to this competition, the existing world records were as follows.

World record	Snatch	Olivia Reeves (USA)	119 kg	Cali, Colombia	16 July 2025
World record	Clean & Jerk	Olivia Reeves (USA)	149 kg	Cali, Colombia	16 July 2025
World record	Total	Olivia Reeves (USA)	268 kg	Cali, Colombia	16 July 2025

== Results ==
Rank	Athlete	Group	Snatch (kg)				Clean & Jerk (kg)				Total
Rank	Athlete	Group	1	2	3	Rank	1	2	3	Rank	Total
1st place, gold medalist(s)	Song Kuk-hyang (PRK)	A	112	120 CWR	—	1st place, gold medalist(s)	140	150 CWR	—	1st place, gold medalist(s)	270 CWR
2nd place, silver medalist(s)	Julieth Rodríguez (COL)	A	107	~~110~~	110	2nd place, silver medalist(s)	131	~~135~~	~~136~~	5	241
3rd place, bronze medalist(s)	Ingrid Segura (BHR)	A	102	105	107 AJR	3rd place, bronze medalist(s)	130	134	~~137~~	2nd place, silver medalist(s)	241 AJR
4	Siuzanna Valodzka (AIN)	A	~~103~~	103	106	5	128	132	~~136~~	4	238
5	Chen Wen-huei (TPE)	B	100	~~104~~	~~105~~	9	127	132	~~136~~	3rd place, bronze medalist(s)	232
6	Charlotte Simoneau (CAN)	A	106	~~111~~	~~111~~	4	126	~~131~~	~~132~~	7	232
7	Fransheska Matías (DOM)	A	97	102	~~106~~	6	128	~~132~~	~~133~~	6	230
8	Olivia Selemaia (NZL)	A	~~102~~	102	~~107~~	7	124 OC	~~128~~	~~130~~	8	226 OC
9	Kristel Macrohon (PHI)	A	~~101~~	101	~~104~~	8	~~122~~	122	—	13	223
10	Alexis Ashworth (CAN)	B	94	97	100	10	~~118~~	118	121	15	221
11	Garoa Martínez (ESP)	B	95	98	~~101~~	11	118	~~122~~	122	12	220
12	Antonia Ackermann (GER)	B	~~95~~	95	98	12	~~115~~	115	121	14	219
13	Indah Afriza (INA)	B	92	96	~~100~~	14	122	~~127~~	~~127~~	10	218
14	Harjinder Kaur (IND)	B	92	95	~~98~~	15	118	~~123~~	123	9	218
15	Line Gude (DEN)	A	95	98	~~101~~	13	120	~~124~~	~~125~~	16	218
16	Sarah Davies (GBR)	B	~~95~~	~~95~~	95	18	~~121~~	122	~~126~~	11	217
17	Paulina Haro (MEX)	C	86	89	92	19	115	118	~~121~~	17	210
18	Jennifer Andersson (SWE)	B	~~95~~	95	~~98~~	17	115	~~120~~	~~120~~	19	210
19	Runa Segawa (JPN)	B	93	95	~~97~~	16	112	~~115~~	115	21	210
20	Julia Loen (NOR)	B	89	92	~~94~~	20	108	112	115	20	207
21	Roberta Tabone (MLT)	C	84	86	88	22	109	~~112~~	~~112~~	23	197
22	Marit Årdalsbakke (NOR)	C	~~89~~	~~89~~	89	21	107	~~110~~	~~111~~	24	196
23	Gina McMonagle (IRL)	C	83	~~86~~	~~86~~	23	107	110	113	22	196
24	Natália Hušťavová (SVK)	C	83	~~86~~	~~86~~	24	102	~~105~~	~~105~~	26	185
25	Winny Langat (KEN)	C	65	~~68~~	~~68~~	25	~~85~~	85	~~88~~	27	150
26	Al-Zahraa Kamshad (KUW)	C	55	58	~~62~~	26	~~75~~	~~75~~	75	28	133
—	Akari Nishio (JPN)	B	~~95~~	~~95~~	~~95~~	—	113	~~118~~	118	18	—
—	Jannike Bäckström (FIN)	C	~~85~~	~~85~~	~~85~~	—	104	107	~~111~~	25	—
—	Tenishia Thornton (MLT)	C	~~100~~	—	—	—	—	—	—	—	—
—	Lisa Schweizer (GER)	A	Did not start								
—	Zarina Gusalova (AIN)	A	Did not start								
X	Erin Barton (CWF)	B	90	~~93~~	93	X	~~120~~	120	~~125~~	X	213
X	Madeline Rosher (CWF)	C	88	~~91~~	92	X	105	110	~~115~~	X	202
X	Rachel Bemrose (CWF)	C	83	85	~~88~~	X	110	~~113~~	113	X	198
X	Sheli McCoy (CWF)	C	80	~~83~~	83	X	~~98~~	~~98~~	98	X	181
X	Ciara Cooper (CWF)	C	~~68~~	68	~~71~~	X	92	96	~~100~~	X	164
