= 2024 World Weightlifting Championships – Women's 76 kg =

Women's 76 kg at the 2024 World Weightlifting Championships
- Venue: Weightlifting Marquee Venue
- Location: Manama, Bahrain
- Dates: 12 December
- Competitors: 19 from 18 nations
- Winning total: 264 kg

Medalists
| gold medal | Song Kuk-hyang | North Korea |
| silver medal | Miyareth Mendoza | Colombia |
| bronze medal | Sarah Matthew | Nigeria |

The women's 76 kilograms competition at the 2024 World Weightlifting Championships was held on 12 December 2024.

== Schedule ==
| Date | Time | Event |
|---|---|---|
| 12 December 2024 | 15:00 | Group B |
| 12 December 2024 | 20:00 | Group A |

== Records ==
Prior to this competition, the existing world records were as follows.

| World record | Snatch | Rim Jong-sim (PRK) | 124 kg | Pattaya, Thailand | 24 September 2019 |
| World record | Clean & jerk | Zhang Wangli (CHN) | 156 kg | Fuzhou, China | 26 February 2019 |
| World record | Total | Rim Jong-sim (PRK) | 278 kg | Ningbo, China | 26 April 2019 |

== Results ==
| Rank | Athlete | Group | Snatch (kg) | | | | Clean & jerk (kg) | | | | Total |
| Rank | Athlete | Group | 1 | 2 | 3 | Rank | 1 | 2 | 3 | Rank | Total |
|---|---|---|---|---|---|---|---|---|---|---|---|
| 1st place, gold medalist(s) | Song Kuk-hyang (PRK) | A | 112 | ~~116~~ | 116 | 1st place, gold medalist(s) | 141 | 148 | ~~153~~ | 1st place, gold medalist(s) | 264 |
| 2nd place, silver medalist(s) | Miyareth Mendoza (COL) | A | 107 | 111 | ~~113~~ | 2nd place, silver medalist(s) | 135 | 137 | ~~140~~ | 2nd place, silver medalist(s) | 248 |
| 3rd place, bronze medalist(s) | Sarah Matthew (NGR) | B | 110 | ~~116~~ | ~~118~~ | 3rd place, bronze medalist(s) | 130 | 135 | ~~140~~ | 4 | 245 |
| 4 | Bella Paredes (ECU) | A | 105 | ~~110~~ | ~~111~~ | 4 | 131 | 136 | ~~138~~ | 3rd place, bronze medalist(s) | 241 |
| 5 | Aisha Omarova (KAZ) | A | 95 | 100 | 102 | 5 | 125 | 130 | ~~132~~ | 6 | 232 |
| 6 | Celia Gold (ISR) | B | 96 | 99 | ~~102~~ | 8 | ~~125~~ | ~~126~~ | 128 | 7 | 227 |
| 7 | Jeon Hee-soo (KOR) | A | 97 | ~~101~~ | ~~101~~ | 9 | 120 | 125 | ~~131~~ | 11 | 222 |
| 8 | Otgonchimegiin Tögs-Erdene (MGL) | B | 95 | 100 | ~~105~~ | 6 | 116 | 121 | ~~123~~ | 13 | 221 |
| 9 | Ayanat Zhumagali (KAZ) | B | 91 | ~~95~~ | 95 | 13 | 120 | 125 | ~~131~~ | 9 | 220 |
| 10 | Elaheh Razzaghi (IRI) | A | 95 | ~~100~~ | ~~101~~ | 14 | 125 | ~~130~~ | ~~131~~ | 10 | 220 |
| 11 | Mariana García (MEX) | B | 90 | 93 | ~~96~~ | 16 | 120 | 123 | 126 | 8 | 219 |
| 12 | Isabella Brown (GBR) | B | ~~96~~ | ~~96~~ | 96 | 11 | 115 | 119 | 122 | 12 | 218 |
| 13 | Nikki Löwik (NED) | B | ~~96~~ | 97 | 100 | 7 | 117 | ~~121~~ | ~~122~~ | 16 | 217 |
| 14 | Liao Yi-tzu (TPE) | B | 93 | ~~96~~ | 96 | 10 | 117 | ~~123~~ | ~~123~~ | 17 | 213 |
| 15 | Nicole Rubanovich (ISR) | B | 91 | 95 | ~~97~~ | 12 | 112 | 115 | 118 | 15 | 213 |
| 16 | Laura Vest Tolstrup (DEN) | B | 88 | 92 | ~~95~~ | 18 | 115 | ~~119~~ | 120 | 14 | 212 |
| 17 | Guðný Björk Stefánsdóttir (ISL) | B | 91 | 94 | ~~96~~ | 15 | 114 | ~~118~~ | ~~120~~ | 19 | 208 |
| 18 | Laura Horváth (HUN) | B | 87 | 90 | 93 | 17 | 109 | ~~114~~ | 115 | 18 | 208 |
| — | Mattie Rogers (USA) | A | ~~105~~ | ~~105~~ | ~~105~~ | — | 130 | ~~136~~ | ~~138~~ | 5 | — |
| — | Ella Nicholson (USA) | A | Did not start | | | | | | | | |
| — | Shania Bedward (CAN) | A | Did not start | | | | | | | | |
