= Ri Suk =

North Korean weightlifter (born 2003)

Personal information
- Born: 16 March 2003 (age 23) North Korea
- Weight: 64 kg (141 lb)

Sport
- Sport: Weightlifting

Achievements and titles
- Personal bests: Snatch: 115 kg (2024); Clean & Jerk: 149 kg (2024, CWR); Total: 264 kg (2024, CWR)
Medal record
Women's weightlifting
Representing North Korea
World Championships
Gold medal – first place	2024 Manama	64 kg
Gold medal – first place	2025 Førde	63 kg
Silver medal – second place	2026 Ningbo	69 kg
Asian Championships
Gold medal – first place	2024 Tashkent	64 kg
Gold medal – first place	2026 Gandhinagar	63 kg
World Cup
Silver medal – second place	2024 Phuket	64 kg

Korean name
- Hangul: 리숙
- RR: Ri Suk
- MR: Ri Suk

Ri Suk (Korean: 리숙; born 16 March 2003) is a North Korean weightlifter competing in the women's 64 kg category. She first competed at the 2018 Asian Youth and Junior Weightlifting Championships, winning both divisions.

After four years from her last competition, she competed at the 2023 IWF Grand Prix II and set seven junior world records and broke the clean and jerk world record held by Deng Wei at the time. She also competed at the 2024 Asian Weightlifting Championships and 2024 World Weightlifting Championships, earning the gold medal in both editions for her first titles in the championships. As of June 2025, she holds the world records for the clean and jerk and total in the category.

== Career ==
Ri Suk was born on 16 March 2003. She first competed at the 2018 Asian Youth and Junior Weightlifting Championships in Urgench, Uzbekistan, in the women's 53 kg category. There she lifted 87 kg in the snatch and 110 kg in the clean and jerk for a total of 197 kg. She won the overall gold medals in both the youth and junior divisions. The following year, she competed at the 2019 edition of the event held in Pyongyang, North Korea, in October. In the women's 64 kg category, she lifted 96 kg in the snatch and 122 kg in the clean and jerk for a total of 218 kg, winning the youth division though placing second in the junior division behind Kumushkhon Fayzullaeva of Uzbekistan.

After a four year absence from international competition, she returned at the 2023 IWF Grand Prix II in Doha, Qatar. She snatched 114 kg and clean and jerked 146 kg for a total of 260 kg in the women's 64 kg category. At this session, she had won the total gold medal, had broken seven junior world records and had set a new senior world record in the clean and jerk, breaking Deng Wei's world record set four years prior. Ri's total was 2 kg off of Deng's world record.

Ri competed at the 2024 Asian Weightlifting Championships in Tashkent, Uzbekistan; she competed in the same category. Ri had a snatch of 112 kg and a clean and jerk of 141 kg for a total of 253 kg, failing to lift 147 kg for her last attempt to break the then-world record held by her. She won the overall gold medal 49 kg over the category's second placer. She then had her first loss of her senior international career after placing second behind Rim Un-sim at the 2024 IWF World Cup in Phuket, Thailand. She snatched 108 kg and clean and jerked 140 kg for a total of 248 kg, placing second by 10 kg.

Her first world championships were the 2024 World Weightlifting Championships in Riyadh, Saudi Arabia. There she snatched 114 kg and clean and jerked 149 kg for a total of 264 kg, breaking the clean and jerk and total world records set by Deng five years ago at the 2019 Asian Weightlifting Championships in Ningbo, China.

== Achievements ==
Competition summary
Year	Venue	Weight	Snatch (kg)				Clean & Jerk (kg)				Total	Rank
Year	Venue	Weight	1	2	3	Rank	1	2	3	Rank	Total	Rank
World Championships
2024	Manama, Bahrain	64 kg	108	112	115	2nd place, silver medalist(s)	143	147	149	1st place, gold medalist(s)	264	1st place, gold medalist(s)
2025	Førde, Norway	63 kg	105	108	111	1st place, gold medalist(s)	136	140	142	1st place, gold medalist(s)	253	1st place, gold medalist(s)
World Cup
2024	Phuket, Thailand	64 kg	108	~~113~~	~~113~~	2nd place, silver medalist(s)	140	~~147~~	~~147~~	2nd place, silver medalist(s)	248	2nd place, silver medalist(s)
Asian Championships
2024	Tashkent, Uzbekistan	64 kg	105	110	112	1st place, gold medalist(s)	135	141	~~147~~	1st place, gold medalist(s)	253	1st place, gold medalist(s)
