= 2025 World Weightlifting Championships – Women's 63 kg =

Women's 63 kg at the 2025 World Weightlifting Championships
- Venue: Førdehuset
- Location: Førde, Norway
- Dates: 4 and 5 October
- Winning total: 253 kg CWR

Medalists
gold medal	Ri Suk	North Korea
silver medal	Maude Charron	Canada
bronze medal	Yenny Sinisterra	Colombia

The women's 63 kilograms competition at the 2025 World Weightlifting Championships was held on 4 and 5 October 2025.

== Schedule ==
Date	Time	Event
4 October 2025	10:00	Group C
5 October 2025	14:30	Group B
5 October 2025	17:00	Group A

== Records ==
Prior to this competition, the existing world records were as follows.

World record	Snatch	World Standard	110 kg	—	1 June 2025
World record	Clean & Jerk	World Standard	139 kg	—	1 June 2025
World record	Total	World Standard	246 kg	—	1 June 2025

== Results ==
Rank	Athlete	Group	Snatch (kg)				Clean & Jerk (kg)				Total
Rank	Athlete	Group	1	2	3	Rank	1	2	3	Rank	Total
1st place, gold medalist(s)	Ri Suk (PRK)	A	105	108	111 CWR	1st place, gold medalist(s)	136	140	142 CWR	1st place, gold medalist(s)	253 CWR
2nd place, silver medalist(s)	Maude Charron (CAN)	A	99	~~103~~	103	3rd place, bronze medalist(s)	128	131	133; AM	2nd place, silver medalist(s)	236
3rd place, bronze medalist(s)	Yenny Sinisterra (COL)	A	100	103	~~106~~	2nd place, silver medalist(s)	128	~~131~~	~~131~~	4	231
4	Elreen Ando (PHI)	A	~~100~~	100	~~103~~	6	129	131	~~133~~	3rd place, bronze medalist(s)	231
5	Sophia Shaft (USA)	A	~~101~~	101	~~103~~	5	126	~~129~~	~~130~~	5	227
6	Katharine Estep (USA)	A	95	98	~~101~~	8	125	~~128~~	~~129~~	6	223
7	Janeth Gómez (MEX)	A	95	~~98~~	98	9	118	121	125	7	223
8	Aysel Özkan (TUR)	A	~~98~~	99	102	4	~~120~~	120	~~124~~	10	222
9	Nirupama Devi Seram (IND)	A	90	93	~~95~~	12	~~123~~	123	~~127~~	8	216
10	Martina Chiacchio (ITA)	A	93	96	100	7	~~115~~	115	~~120~~	16	215
11	Andreea Cotruța (ROU)	A	94	~~97~~	~~97~~	11	115	120	~~123~~	9	214
12	Ann-Sophie Taschereau (CAN)	B	91	~~94~~	95	10	112	116	118	12	213
13	Naroa Arrasate (ESP)	B	~~90~~	90	~~92~~	14	116	~~119~~	~~120~~	13	206
14	Vicky Graillot (FRA)	B	87	90	~~92~~	13	~~114~~	~~115~~	115	15	205
15	Chiu Yu-ling (TPE)	B	~~85~~	85	~~90~~	20	113	118	~~122~~	11	203
16	Inka Tiainen (FIN)	B	~~85~~	85	~~88~~	21	108	111	114	17	199
17	Nur Syazwani Radzi (MAS)	B	~~86~~	87	~~90~~	18	111	~~115~~	~~115~~	18	198
18	Patricie Gasior (CZE)	B	~~87~~	87	~~89~~	19	108	111	~~114~~	19	198
19	Eldi Paredes (PER)	B	~~85~~	85	~~88~~	22	105	108	111	20	196
20	Paula Zikowsky (AUT)	B	89	~~91~~	~~91~~	16	102	106	~~109~~	23	195
21	Hannah Crymble (IRL)	B	84	87	~~90~~	17	104	~~107~~	107	22	194
22	Amalie Løvind (DEN)	C	77	80	83	25	103	107	~~110~~	21	190
23	Katla Björk Ketilsdóttir (ISL)	B	84	~~87~~	~~88~~	24	~~100~~	100	104	24	188
24	Annelien Vandenabeele (BEL)	C	81	84	~~86~~	23	100	103	~~106~~	25	187
25	Helena Rønnebæk (DEN)	C	78	~~81~~	~~83~~	27	~~100~~	100	~~103~~	26	178
26	Bibiána Večeřová (SVK)	C	78	~~81~~	~~81~~	26	97	~~100~~	~~101~~	28	175
27	Rachel Monaghan (IRL)	C	~~75~~	75	~~78~~	29	95	98	~~101~~	27	173
28	Mai Al-Madani (UAE)	C	72	75	77	28	90	~~94~~	~~95~~	31	167
29	Anneke Spies-Burger (RSA)	C	~~73~~	73	~~75~~	30	88	91	94	30	167
30	Cheng Ching To (HKG)	C	63	~~66~~	67	31	83	~~86~~	~~87~~	32	150
—	Zoe de Gersigny (AUS)	B	~~87~~	~~89~~	~~90~~	—	110	115	~~120~~	14	—
—	Nadita Aprilia (INA)	B	~~90~~	90	~~94~~	15	~~115~~	~~115~~	~~115~~	—	—
—	Eva Stassijns (BEL)	C	~~80~~	~~80~~	~~80~~	—	94	~~96~~	96	29	—
—	Emma McIntyre (NZL)	C	Did not start								
—	Aya Amerane (MAR)	C	Did not start								
X	Beth Ashbee (CWF)	C	~~85~~	85	88	X	~~97~~	~~97~~	97	X	185
X	Bethan Watkins (CWF)	C	78	~~81~~	~~81~~	X	98	~~101~~	~~101~~	X	176
