= 2026 World Weightlifting Championships – Women's 69 kg =

Women's 69 kg at the 2026 World Weightlifting Championships
- Venue: Ningbo Olympic Sports Center
- Location: Ningbo, China
- Dates: 3 November
- Competitors: 48 from 39 nations
- Winning total: 275 kg WR

Medalists
gold medal	Song Kuk-hyang	North Korea
silver medal	Ri Suk	North Korea
bronze medal	Julieth Rodríguez	Colombia

The women's 69 kilograms competition at the 2026 World Weightlifting Championships was held on 3 November 2026.

== Schedule ==
Date	Time	Event
3 November 2026	11:00	Group D
3 November 2026	13:30	Group C
3 November 2026	16:00	Group B
3 November 2026	19:00	Group A

== Records ==
Prior to this competition, the existing world records were as follows.

World record	Snatch	Song Kuk-hyang (PRK)	121 kg	Nagoya, Japan	27 September 2026
World record	Clean & Jerk	Song Kuk-hyang (PRK)	152 kg	Nagoya, Japan	27 September 2026
World record	Total	Song Kuk-hyang (PRK)	273 kg	Nagoya, Japan	27 September 2026

== Results ==
Rank	Athlete	Group	Snatch (kg)				Clean & Jerk (kg)				Total
Rank	Athlete	Group	1	2	3	Rank	1	2	3	Rank	Total
1st place, gold medalist(s)	Song Kuk-hyang (PRK)	A	~~114~~	114	122; WR	1st place, gold medalist(s)	145	153; WR	—	1st place, gold medalist(s)	275; WR
2nd place, silver medalist(s)	Ri Suk (PRK)	A	108	112	~~115~~	2nd place, silver medalist(s)	143	147	~~151~~	2nd place, silver medalist(s)	259
3rd place, bronze medalist(s)	Julieth Rodríguez (COL)	A	~~109~~	109	~~113~~	3rd place, bronze medalist(s)	130	134	136	5	245
4	Siuzanna Valodzka (BLR)	A	103	106	108	5	~~130~~	133	136	4	244
5	Emily Ibanez (KOS)	B	101	104	106; WYR	8	127	131	134; WYR	6	240; WYR
6	Fransheska Matías (DOM)	A	106	~~109~~	~~110~~	9	134	~~138~~	~~138~~	7	240
7	Zarina Gusalova (RUS)	A	103	106	109	4	125	130	~~133~~	12	239
8	Charlotte Simoneau (CAN)	B	~~107~~	~~107~~	107	6	127	131	~~134~~	10	238
9	Roufida Fathi (EGY)	A	98	101	~~103~~	22	130	~~135~~	137	3rd place, bronze medalist(s)	238
10	Reihaneh Karimi (IRI)	A	~~102~~	103	~~108~~	18	~~133~~	133	~~138~~	8	236
11	Ingrid Segura (BHR)	B	98	102	~~104~~	20	~~127~~	127	131	11	233
12	Chen Wen-huei (TPE)	B	100	104	~~108~~	12	128	~~133~~	~~134~~	13	232
13	Nuray Güngör (TUR)	A	100	104	106	10	125	~~130~~	~~131~~	19	231
14	Bella Paredes (ECU)	B	101	105	~~107~~	11	125	~~129~~	~~130~~	18	230
15	Claudia Rengifo (VEN)	A	104	~~107~~	~~107~~	13	~~126~~	126	~~129~~	16	230
16	Lisa Schweizer (GER)	A	~~103~~	~~103~~	104	15	120	125	~~128~~	20	229
17	Yui Miyagoe (JPN)	C	99	101	103	16	120	125	~~127~~	17	228
18	Naroa Arrasate (ESP)	C	95	~~98~~	~~98~~	31	126	129	131	9	226
19	Yenny Sinisterra (COL)	B	98	102	106	7	120	~~125~~	~~126~~	31	226
20	Carja Enkileda (ALB)	C	98	100	102	19	~~120~~	~~120~~	121	28	223
21	Kristel Macrohon (PHI)	B	~~98~~	98	101	21	122	~~126~~	~~126~~	26	223
22	Medine Amanowa (TKM)	C	93	96	~~99~~	27	120	124	126	15	222
23	Nya Hayman (AUS)	C	96	~~99~~	99	23	118	122	~~126~~	25	221
24	Runa Segawa (JPN)	B	94	~~97~~	~~97~~	33	124	127	~~131~~	14	221
25	Sarah Davies (GBR)	B	95	97	~~99~~	25	119	123	~~126~~	21	220
26	Dziyana Maiseyevich (BLR)	B	97	~~100~~	~~100~~	24	118	122	~~126~~	27	219
27	Olivia Selemaia (NZL)	B	93	96	~~99~~	29	117	~~122~~	123	22	219
28	Janeth Gómez (MEX)	C	93	96	~~99~~	28	118	122	~~125~~	24	218
29	Indah Afriza (INA)	B	~~93~~	94	~~97~~	34	~~123~~	~~123~~	123	23	217
30	Alexis Ashworth (CAN)	C	93	96	~~99~~	26	115	~~120~~	120	30	216
31	Boldbaataryn Khongorzul (MGL)	B	93	~~97~~	~~97~~	36	118	121	~~124~~	29	214
32	Madeline Rosher (GBR)	C	95	~~97~~	~~97~~	30	114	117	~~119~~	33	212
33	Garoa Martínez (ESP)	C	~~93~~	93	~~97~~	35	118	~~122~~	~~122~~	32	211
34	Constanza Celis (CHI)	D	90	~~94~~	94	32	110	114	~~116~~	36	208
35	Fatemeh Keshavarz (WRT)	D	89	92	~~94~~	37	112	115	~~117~~	35	207
36	Lijana Jakaitė (LTU)	C	~~90~~	90	~~92~~	40	110	~~113~~	114	37	204
37	Sienna Fesolai (NZL)	D	~~89~~	89	92	38	110	115	~~119~~	39	202
38	Myrthe Timmermans (NED)	C	89	~~92~~	~~92~~	41	~~111~~	112	~~115~~	38	201
39	Gina McMonagle (IRL)	D	85	~~88~~	~~88~~	44	111	115	~~117~~	34	200
40	Hannah Crymble (IRL)	D	85	88	~~91~~	42	104	108	110	40	198
41	Ech-Chaibia Ech-Chachouiy (MAR)	D	90	~~95~~	~~95~~	39	106	~~110~~	~~114~~	41	196
42	Rachelle Sim (SGP)	D	83	~~87~~	87	43	101	~~105~~	~~107~~	43	188
43	Claris Turanivalu (FIJ)	D	75	80	82	45	95	100	~~102~~	44	182
44	Mercy Kerubo (KEN)	D	75	79	~~82~~	46	95	~~98~~	~~98~~	45	174
—	Genna Toko Kegne (ITA)	A	104	~~108~~	~~110~~	14	~~130~~	~~135~~	~~137~~	—	—
—	Martyna Dołęga (POL)	A	100	103	~~105~~	17	—	—	—	—	—
—	Daniela Gherman (ROU)	B	~~98~~	~~98~~	~~98~~	—	—	—	—	—	—
—	Bibiána Večeřová (SVK)	D	~~83~~	~~83~~	~~83~~	—	97	102	106	42	—
