= 2026 World Weightlifting Championships – Women's +86 kg =

Women's +86 kg at the 2026 World Weightlifting Championships
- Venue: Ningbo Olympic Sports Center
- Location: Ningbo, China
- Dates: 8 November
- Competitors: 28 from 23 nations
- Winning total: 317 kg

Medalists
gold medal	Li Yan	China
silver medal	Park Hye-jeong	South Korea
bronze medal	Kim Hyo-eon	South Korea

The women's +86 kilograms competition at the 2026 World Weightlifting Championships was held on 8 November 2026.

== Schedule ==
Date	Time	Event
8 November 2026	09:00	Group C
8 November 2026	11:30	Group B
8 November 2026	16:30	Group A

== Records ==
Prior to this competition, the existing world records were as follows.

World record	Snatch	Li Yan (CHN)	145 kg	Gandhinagar, India	17 May 2026
World record	Clean & Jerk	World Standard	181 kg	—	1 June 2025
World record	Total	World Standard	325 kg	—	1 June 2025

== Results ==
Rank	Athlete	Group	Snatch (kg)				Clean & Jerk (kg)				Total
Rank	Athlete	Group	1	2	3	Rank	1	2	3	Rank	Total
1st place, gold medalist(s)	Li Yan (CHN)	A	140	146	147; WR	1st place, gold medalist(s)	170	~~179~~	~~179~~	1st place, gold medalist(s)	317
2nd place, silver medalist(s)	Park Hye-jeong (KOR)	A	121	125	—	2nd place, silver medalist(s)	158	161	—	2nd place, silver medalist(s)	286
3rd place, bronze medalist(s)	Kim Hyo-eon (KOR)	A	113	~~118~~	118	6	153	~~159~~	159	3rd place, bronze medalist(s)	277
4	Naryury Pérez (VEN)	A	115	118	121	3rd place, bronze medalist(s)	145	149	~~151~~	7	270
5	Wang Ling-chen (TPE)	A	115	~~120~~	120	4	150	~~154~~	~~154~~	6	270
6	Lyubov Kovalchuk (KAZ)	A	111	116	~~120~~	7	147	~~155~~	~~156~~	9	263
7	Marifélix Sarría (CUB)	A	108	~~112~~	~~112~~	17	153	~~160~~	~~160~~	4	261
8	Taiane de Lima (BRA)	B	110	~~114~~	~~115~~	11	145	150	~~155~~	5	260
9	Rahma Ahmed (EGY)	B	116	119	~~121~~	5	~~140~~	140	~~144~~	16	259
10	Mary Theisen-Lappen (USA)	A	112	~~115~~	~~116~~	10	146	~~151~~	~~153~~	11	258
11	Crismery Santana (DOM)	B	113	~~117~~	~~117~~	8	144	~~148~~	~~148~~	12	257
12	Caitlin Thilges (USA)	B	105	110	~~113~~	14	147	~~151~~	~~155~~	8	257
13	Abdeel Rodríguez (MEX)	B	110	~~114~~	~~114~~	13	140	~~145~~	146	10	256
14	Valentyna Kisil (UKR)	B	110	~~113~~	113	9	131	134	137	18	250
15	Siti Aqilah Farhana Draman (MAS)	B	110	~~115~~	~~115~~	12	140	~~143~~	~~143~~	14	250
16	Tuana Süren (TUR)	B	~~108~~	108	~~111~~	16	138	141	~~143~~	13	249
17	Etta Love (CAN)	B	100	103	107	18	130	134	138	17	245
18	Laura Jiménez (MEX)	B	100	105	~~109~~	19	135	140	~~146~~	15	245
19	Aurelia Pedersen (DEN)	C	103	108	~~112~~	15	127	133	136	19	244
20	Lenka Žembová (SVK)	C	99	102	~~105~~	20	124	~~127~~	127	21	229
21	Sarah Fischer (AUT)	C	96	99	~~101~~	22	125	128	~~131~~	20	227
22	Erla Ágústsdóttir (ISL)	C	~~98~~	99	~~103~~	23	120	125	~~130~~	22	224
23	Gendendambyn Chinbolor (MGL)	C	93	97	100	21	117	121	~~124~~	25	221
24	Friðný Fjóla Jónsdóttir (ISL)	C	98	~~101~~	~~103~~	24	122	~~126~~	~~128~~	23	220
25	Batbayaryn Enkhjin (MGL)	C	96	~~99~~	~~100~~	25	118	122	~~126~~	24	218
26	Pavlína Šedá (CZE)	C	90	94	~~97~~	26	110	115	117	27	211
27	Leyna-May Domonatani (FIJ)	C	~~86~~	86	~~90~~	27	110	115	120	26	206
28	Juliana Ongonga (KEN)	C	80	~~85~~	~~86~~	28	100	~~104~~	104	28	184
