= Ingrid Segura =

Bahraini weightlifter (born 2006)

Personal information
- Full name: Ingrid Vanesa Segura Grueso
- Born: 29 June 2006 (age 20)

Sport
- Country: Colombia In July 2025, representing Bahrain
- Sport: Weightlifting
- Weight class: 69 kg
Medal record
Women's weightlifting
Representing Bahrain
World Championships
| Bronze medal – third place | 2025 Førde | 69 kg |
Asian Games
| Bronze medal – third place | 2026 Aichi–Nagoya | 69 kg |
Islamic Solidarity Games
| Gold medal – first place | 2025 Riyadh | 69 kg CJ |
| Gold medal – first place | 2025 Riyadh | 69 kg T |
| Silver medal – second place | 2025 Riyadh | 69 kg S |
Representing Colombia
Junior World Championships
| Gold medal – first place | 2024 León | 64 kg |
Youth World Championships
| Gold medal – first place | 2021 Jeddah | 64 kg |
| Gold medal – first place | 2022 León | 64 kg |
| Bronze medal – third place | 2023 Durrës | 64 kg |

Ingrid Vanesa Segura Grueso (born 29 June 2006) is a weightlifter representing Bahrain. She is a bronze medalist at the 2025 World Weightlifting Championships.

== Carear ==
Ingrid Segura was born in Colombia in 2006. Since 2021, she has represented Colombia at the Youth World Weightlifting Championships. In 2021 and 2022, she became World Champion in her age category in the 64 kg weight class.

In July 2025, representing Bahrain, she competed in the Junior Asian Championships. She won the title in the 69 kg weight class with a combined total of 238 kg.

The same year In October, at the 2025 World Weightlifting Championships in Førde, Norway, won a bronze medal (241 kg) in the new 69 kg weight class. She placed third in the snatch (107 kg) and settled for a small silver medal (134 kg) in the clean and jerk.
