= List of Chinese records in Olympic weightlifting =

The following are the records of PR China in Olympic weightlifting. Records are maintained in each weight class for the snatch lift, clean and jerk lift, and the total for both lifts by the Chinese Weightlifting Association (CWA).

== Men ==
Event	Record	Athlete	Date	Meet	Place	Ref
-60 kg
Snatch	141 kg	Standard				
Clean & Jerk	169 kg	Standard				
Total	308 kg	Standard				
-65 kg
Snatch	152 kg	He Yueji	24 September 2026	Asian Games	Nagoya, Japan	
Clean & Jerk	183 kg	He Yueji	13 May 2026	Asian Championships	Gandhinagar, India	
Total	329 kg	He Yueji	13 May 2026	Asian Championships	Gandhinagar, India	
-70 kg
Snatch	154 kg	He Yueji	5 August 2026	National Grand Prix	Rongchang, China	
Clean & Jerk	188 kg		5 August 2026	National Grand Prix	Rongchang, China	
Total	339 kg	He Baozhen	30 October 2026	World Championships	Ningbo, China	
-75 kg
Snatch	160 kg	Standard				
Clean & Jerk	197 kg	Standard				
Total	355 kg	Standard				
-85 kg
Snatch	171 kg	Xiang Feiyang	23 April 2026	National Championships	Yibin, China	
Clean & Jerk	214 kg	Lei Jiangqing	2 November 2026	World Championships	Ningbo, China	
Total	382 kg	Lei Jiangqing	2 November 2026	World Championships	Ningbo, China	
-95 kg
Snatch	180 kg	Standard				
Clean & Jerk	220 kg	Standard				
Total	398 kg	Standard				
-110 kg
Snatch	191 kg	Standard				
Clean & Jerk	236 kg	Standard				
Total	425 kg	Standard				
+110 kg
Snatch	195 kg	Standard				
Clean & Jerk	240 kg	Standard				
Total	433 kg	Standard				

== Women ==
Event	Record	Athlete	Date	Meet	Place	Ref
-49 kg
Snatch	95 kg	Standard				
Clean & Jerk	120 kg	Standard				
Total	213 kg	Standard				
-53 kg
Snatch	101 kg	Zhang Haiqin	4 August 2026	National Grand Prix	Rongchang, China	
Clean & Jerk	126 kg	Zhang Haiqin	4 August 2026	National Grand Prix	Rongchang, China	
Total	227 kg	Zhang Haiqin	4 August 2026	National Grand Prix	Rongchang, China	
-57 kg
Snatch	105 kg	Ye Xinye	5 August 2026	National Grand Prix	Rongchang, China	
Clean & Jerk	130 kg	Standard				
Total	232 kg	Standard				
-61 kg
Snatch	112 kg	Yang Liuyue	25 September 2026	Asian Games	Nagoya, Japan	
Clean & Jerk	142 kg	Pei Xinyi	1 November 2026	World Championships	Ningbo, China	
Total	254 kg	Pei Xinyi	1 November 2026	World Championships	Ningbo, China	
-69 kg
Snatch	115 kg	Standard				
Clean & Jerk	145 kg	Standard				
Total	258 kg	Standard				
-77 kg
Snatch	126 kg	Peng Cuiting	5 November 2026	World Championships	Ningbo, China	
Clean & Jerk	155 kg	Standard				
Total	276 kg	Standard				
-86 kg
Snatch	130 kg	Standard				
Clean & Jerk	163 kg	Liao Guifang	7 November 2026	World Championships	Ningbo, China	
Total	291 kg	Liao Guifang	7 November 2026	World Championships	Ningbo, China	
+86 kg
Snatch	147 kg	Li Yan	8 November 2026	World Championships	Ningbo, China	
Clean & Jerk	181 kg	Standard				
Total	325 kg	Standard				

== Historical records ==
=== Men (2018-2025) ===
Event	Record	Athlete	Date	Meet	Place	Ref
-55 kg
Snatch	130 kg	Jia Xionghui	22 October 2020	National Championships	Quzhou, China	
Clean & Jerk	160 kg	Zou Weibin	12 November 2022	National Championships	Haining, China	
Total	278 kg	Meng Cheng	6 September 2018	National Championships	Kaihua, China	
-61 kg
Snatch	147 kg	Jia Xionghui	21 September 2021	National Games	Weinan, China	
Clean & Jerk	175 kg	Li Fabin	22 October 2020	National Championships	Quzhou, China	
Total	318 kg	Li Fabin	19 September 2019	World Championships	Pattaya, Thailand	
-67 kg
Snatch	156 kg	Huang Minhao	7 September 2018	National Championships	Kaihua, China	
Clean & Jerk	187 kg	Chen Lijun	20 September 2019	World Championships	Pattaya, Thailand	
Total	339 kg	Chen Lijun	21 April 2019	Asian Championships	Ningbo, China	
-73 kg
Snatch	170 kg	Shi Zhiyong	22 September 2021	National Games	Weinan, China	
Clean & Jerk	199 kg	Shi Zhiyong	23 October 2020	National Championships	Quzhou, China	
Total	365 kg	Shi Zhiyong	22 September 2021	National Games	Weinan, China	
-81 kg
Snatch	175 kg	Li Dayin	21 April 2021	Asian Championships	Tashkent, Uzbekistan	
Clean & Jerk	207 kg	Lü Xiaojun	22 September 2019	World Championships	Pattaya, Thailand	
Total	378 kg	Lü Xiaojun	22 September 2019	World Championships	Pattaya, Thailand	
-89 kg
Snatch	180 kg	Li Dayin	10 May 2023	Asian Championships	Jinju, South Korea	
Clean & Jerk	222 kg	Tian Tao	10 May 2023	Asian Championships	Jinju, South Korea	
Total	396 kg	Li Dayin	10 May 2023	Asian Championships	Jinju, South Korea	
-96 kg
Snatch	181 kg	Tian Tao	7 November 2018	World Championships	Ashgabat, Turkmenistan	
Clean & Jerk	231 kg	Tian Tao	7 July 2019	Olympics Test Event	Tokyo, Japan	
Total	410 kg	Tian Tao	24 September 2019	World Championships	Pattaya, Thailand	
-102 kg
Snatch	186 kg	Liu Huanhua	10 August 2024	Olympic Games	Paris, France	
Clean & Jerk	232 kg	Liu Huanhua	8 April 2024	World Cup	Phuket, Thailand	
Total	414 kg	Liu Huanhua	19 November 2025	National Games	Dongguan, China	
-109 kg
Snatch	200 kg	Yang Zhe	24 April 2021	Asian Championships	Tashkent, Uzbekistan	
Clean & Jerk	233 kg	Liu Huanhua	6 October 2023	Asian Games	Hangzhou, China	
Total	421 kg	Yang Zhe	24 October 2020	National Championships	Quzhou, China	
+109 kg
Snatch	195 kg	Zhou Xin	26 April 2024	National Championships	Minhou, China	
Clean & Jerk	240 kg	Ai Yunan	9 September 2018	National Championships	Kaihua, China	
Total	432 kg	Ai Yunan	9 September 2018	National Championships	Kaihua, China	

=== Men (1998–2018) ===
Event	Record	Athlete	Date	Meet	Place	Ref
-56 kg
Snatch	139 kg	Wu Jingbiao	21 April 2015	National Championships	Zhejiang, China	
Clean & Jerk	170 kg	Long Qingquan	7 August 2016	Olympic Games	Rio de Janeiro, Brazil	
Total	307 kg	Long Qingquan	7 August 2016	Olympic Games	Rio de Janeiro, Brazil	
-62 kg
Snatch	153 kg	Shi Zhiyong	28 June 2002	World University Championships	İzmir, Turkey	
Clean & Jerk	183 kg	Chen Lijun	22 November 2015	World Championships	Houston, United States	
Total	333 kg	Chen Lijun	22 November 2015	World Championships	Houston, United States	
-69 kg
Snatch	166 kg	Liao Hui	10 November 2014	World Championships	Almaty, Kazakhstan	
Clean & Jerk	198 kg	Liao Hui	23 October 2013	World Championships	Wrocław, Poland	
Total	360 kg	Shi Zhiyong	20 April 2018	National Championships	Yichang, China	
-77 kg
Snatch	177 kg	Lü Xiaojun	10 August 2016	Olympic Games	Rio de Janeiro, Brazil	
Clean & Jerk	209 kg	Su Dajin	24 October 2009	National Games	Jinan, China	
Total	381 kg	Lü Xiaojun	17 April 2016	National Championships	Jiangshan, China	
-85 kg
Snatch	180 kg	Lu Yong	15 August 2008	Olympic Games	Beijing, China	
Clean & Jerk	221 kg	Tian Tao	17 April 2017	National Championships	Jiangshan, China	
Total	395 kg	Tian Tao	18 April 2016	National Championships	Jiangshan, China	
-94 kg
Snatch	180 kg	Jiang Hairong	25 October 2009	National Games	Jinan, China	
Clean & Jerk	221 kg	Li Bing	26 March 2013	National Championships	Zibo, China	
Total	394 kg	Liu Hao	25 September 2014	Asian Games	Incheon, South Korea	
-105 kg
Snatch	198 kg	Cui Wenhua	19 April 1998	National Championships	Chongqing, China	
Clean & Jerk	227 kg	Gao Chuang	23 October 2016	National Championships	Shilong, China	
Total	420 kg	Cui Wenhua	19 November 1998	World Championships	Lahti, Finland	
+105 kg
Snatch	202 kg	Sun Haibo	5 September 2017	National Games	Tianjin, China	
Clean & Jerk	250 kg	Han Wenliang	6 September 2003	National Championships	Qinhuangdao, China	
Total	447.5 kg	Han Wenliang	6 September 2003	National Championships	Qinhuangdao, China	

=== Women (2018-2025) ===
Event	Record	Athlete	Date	Meet	Place	Ref
-45 kg
Snatch	90 kg	Zhao Jinhong	9 May 2025	Asian Championships	Jiangshan, China	
Clean & Jerk	113 kg	Zhao Jinhong	6 December 2024	World Championships	Manama, Bahrain	
Total	200 kg	Zhao Jinhong	6 December 2024	World Championships	Manama, Bahrain	
-49 kg
Snatch	97 kg	Hou Zhihui	1 April 2024	World Cup	Phuket, Thailand	
Clean & Jerk	120 kg	Jiang Huihua	5 September 2023	World Championships	Riyadh, Saudi Arabia	
Total	217 kg	Hou Zhihui	1 April 2024	World Cup	Phuket, Thailand	
-55 kg
Snatch	102 kg	Li Yajun	3 November 2018	World Championships	Ashgabat, Turkmenistan	
Clean & Jerk	130 kg	Zhang Haiqin	5 November 2022	National Championships	Zhangjiagang, China	
Total	227 kg	Liao Qiuyun	20 September 2019	World Championships	Pattaya, Thailand	
-59 kg
Snatch	108 kg	Luo Shifang	8 December 2023	IWF Grand Prix II	Doha, Qatar	
Clean & Jerk	140 kg	Luo Shifang	3 April 2024	World Cup	Phuket, Thailand	
Total	248 kg	Luo Shifang	3 April 2024	World Cup	Phuket, Thailand	
-64 kg
Snatch	117 kg	Deng Wei	11 December 2019	World Cup	Tianjin, China	
Clean & Jerk	145 kg	Deng Wei	1 September 2018	National Championships	Baoji, China	
Total	261 kg	Deng Wei	22 September 2019	World Championships	Pattaya, Thailand	
-71 kg
Snatch	123 kg	Peng Cuiting	17 October 2020	National Championships	Shaoyang, China	
Clean & Jerk	153 kg	Liao Guifang	13 September 2023	World Championships	Riyadh, Saudi Arabia	
Total	273 kg	Liao Guifang	13 September 2023	World Championships	Riyadh, Saudi Arabia	
-76 kg
Snatch	125 kg	Peng Cuiting	18 September 2021	National Games	Weinan, China	
Clean & Jerk	158 kg	Liao Guifang	13 November 2025	National Games	Dongguan, China	
Total	279 kg	Liao Guifang	13 May 2025	Asian Championships	Jiangshan, China	
-81 kg
Snatch	128 kg	Peng Cuiting	13 November 2025	National Games	Dongguan, China	
Clean & Jerk	161 kg	Liang Xiaomei	12 December 2023	IWF Grand Prix II	Doha, Qatar	
Total	284 kg	Liang Xiaomei	12 December 2023	IWF Grand Prix II	Doha, Qatar	
-87 kg
Snatch	126 kg	Wang Zhouyu	12 December 2019	World Cup	Tianjin, China	
Clean & Jerk	160 kg	Wang Zhouyu	19 October 2020	National Championships	Shaoyang, China	
Total	286 kg	Wang Zhouyu	19 October 2020	National Championships	Shaoyang, China	
+87 kg
Snatch	149 kg	Li Yan	15 December 2024	World Championships	Manama, Bahrain	
Clean & Jerk	187 kg	Li Wenwen	19 October 2020	National Championships	Shaoyang, China	
Total	335 kg	Li Wenwen	25 April 2021	Asian Championships	Tashkent, Uzbekistan	

=== Women (1998–2018) ===
Event	Record	Athlete	Date	Meet	Place	Ref
48 kg
Snatch	99 kg	Wang Mingjuan	17 October 2009	National Games	Jinan, China	
Clean & Jerk	126 kg	Tian Yuan	2 April 2012	National Championships	Jinan, China	
Total	221 kg	Tian Yuan	2 April 2012	National Championships	Jinan, China	
53 kg
Snatch	105 kg	Li Yajun	4 September 2013	National Games	Shenyang, China	
Clean & Jerk	132 kg	Li Ping	17 October 2009	National Games	Jinan, China	
Total	235 kg	Li Ping	17 October 2009	National Games	Jinan, China	
58 kg
Snatch	115 kg	Song Zhijuan	13 November 2001	National Games	Guangzhou, China	
Clean & Jerk	142.5 kg	Gu Wei	11 October 2005	National Games	Suzhou, China	
Total	255 kg	Chen Yanqing	11 October 2005	National Games	Suzhou, China	
63 kg
Snatch	122 kg	Ouyang Xiaofang	18 October 2009	National Games	Jinan, China	
Clean & Jerk	149 kg	Deng Wei	10 April 2016	National Championships	Longyan, China	
Total	265 kg	Ouyang Xiaofang	18 October 2009	National Games	Jinan, China	
69 kg
Snatch	129 kg	Xiang Yanmei	9 May 2015	National Championships	Zhejiang, China	
Clean & Jerk	158 kg	Liu Chunhong	13 August 2008	Olympic Games	Beijing, China	
Total	286 kg	Liu Chunhong	13 August 2008	Olympic Games	Beijing, China	
75 kg
Snatch	131 kg	Kang Yue	19 April 2014	National Championships	Qianan, China	
Clean & Jerk	160 kg	Kang Yue	6 September 2013	National Games	Shenyang, China	
Total	291 kg	Kang Yue	25 September 2014	Asian Games	Incheon, South Korea	
+75 kg
Snatch	148 kg	Zhou Lulu	20 October 2009	National Games	Jinan, China	
Clean & Jerk	193 kg	Meng Suping	10 May 2015	National Championships	Zhejiang, China	
Total	334 kg	Zhou Lulu	26 September 2014	Asian Games	Incheon, South Korea	
