= List of United States records in Olympic weightlifting =

The following are the records of the United States in Olympic weightlifting. Records are maintained in each weight class for the snatch lift, clean and jerk lift, and the total for both lifts by USA Weightlifting.

== Current records ==
=== Men ===
Event	Record	Athlete	Date	Meet	Place	Ref
60 kg
Snatch	126 kg	Gabriel Chhum	27 April 2026	Pan American Championships	Panama City, Panama	
Clean & Jerk	166 kg	Standard				
Total	293 kg	Standard				
65 kg
Snatch	143 kg	Hampton Morris	28 October 2026	World Championships	Ningbo, China	
Clean & Jerk	185 kg	Hampton Morris	28 October 2026	World Championships	Ningbo, China	
Total	328 kg	Hampton Morris	28 October 2026	World Championships	Ningbo, China	
70 kg
Snatch	142 kg	Hampton Morris	11 September 2026	Virus Weightlifting Series	Fort Worth, United States	
Clean & Jerk	188 kg	Hampton Morris	11 September 2026	Virus Weightlifting Series	Fort Worth, United States	
Total	330 kg	Hampton Morris	11 September 2026	Virus Weightlifting Series	Fort Worth, United States	
75 kg
Snatch	150 kg	Standard				
Clean & Jerk	199 kg	Standard				
Total	349 kg	Standard				
85 kg
Snatch	158 kg	Standard				
Clean & Jerk	198 kg	Caden Cahoy	2 November 2026	World Championships	Ningbo, China	
Total	349 kg	Standard				
95 kg
Snatch	166 kg	Standard				
Clean & Jerk	197 kg	Daniel Wiitanen	13 September 2026	Virus Weightlifting Series	Fort Worth, United States	
Total	359 kg	Daniel Wiitanen	13 September 2026	Virus Weightlifting Series	Fort Worth, United States	
110 kg
Snatch	173 kg	Kolbi Ferguson	30 April 2026	Pan American Championships	Panama City, Panama	
Clean & Jerk	227 kg	Kolbi Ferguson	6 November 2026	World Championships	Ningbo, China	
Total	397 kg	Kolbi Ferguson	30 April 2026	Pan American Championships	Panama City, Panama	
+110 kg
Snatch	187 kg	Aaron Williams	18 July 2025	Pan American Championships	Cali, Colombia	
Clean & Jerk	233 kg	Aaron Williams	6 March 2026	Virus Weightlifting Series	Columbus, United States	
Total	418 kg	Aaron Williams	6 March 2026	Virus Weightlifting Series	Columbus, United States	

=== Women ===
Event	Record	Athlete	Date	Meet	Place	Ref
49 kg
Snatch	78 kg	Standard				
Clean & Jerk	101 kg	Standard				
Total	179 kg	Standard				
53 kg
Snatch	98 kg	Miranda Ulrey	29 October 2026	World Championships	Ningbo, China	
Clean & Jerk	122 kg	Miranda Ulrey	29 October 2026	World Championships	Ningbo, China	
Total	220 kg	Miranda Ulrey	29 October 2026	World Championships	Ningbo, China	
57 kg
Snatch	94 kg	Standard				
Clean & Jerk	110 kg	Standard				
Total	204 kg	Standard				
61 kg
Snatch	107 kg	Standard				
Clean & Jerk	131 kg	Standard				
Total	238 kg	Standard				
69 kg
Snatch	119 kg	Olivia Reeves	16 July 2025	Pan American Championships	Cali, Colombia	
Clean & Jerk	149 kg	Olivia Reeves	16 July 2025	Pan American Championships	Cali, Colombia	
Total	258 kg	Standard				
Total	268 kg	Olivia Reeves	16 July 2025	Pan American Championships	Cali, Colombia	
77 kg
Snatch	125 kg	Olivia Reeves	6 March 2026	Virus Weightlifting Series	Columbus, United States	
Clean & Jerk	155 kg	Olivia Reeves	8 October 2025	World Championships	Førde, Norway	
Total	279 kg	Olivia Reeves	6 March 2026	Virus Weightlifting Series	Columbus, United States	
86 kg
Snatch	120 kg	Ella Nicholson	6 November 2026	World Championships	Ningbo, China	
Clean & Jerk	145 kg	Ella Nicholson	6 November 2026	World Championships	Ningbo, China	
Total	265 kg	Ella Nicholson	6 November 2026	World Championships	Ningbo, China	
+86 kg
Snatch	117 kg	Mary Theisen-Lappen	18 July 2025	Pan American Championships	Cali, Colombia	
Clean & Jerk	161 kg	Mary Theisen-Lappen	18 July 2025	Pan American Championships	Cali, Colombia	
Total	278 kg	Mary Theisen-Lappen	18 July 2025	Pan American Championships	Cali, Colombia	

== Historical records ==
=== Men (2025–2026) ===
Event	Record	Athlete	Date	Meet	Place	Ref
71 kg
Snatch	147 kg	Standard				
Clean & Jerk	185 kg	Standard				
Total	339 kg	Standard				
79 kg
Snatch	155 kg	Caden Cahoy	6 October 2025	World Championships	Førde, Norway	
Clean & Jerk	204 kg	Caden Cahoy	28 April 2026	Pan American Championships	Panama City, Panama	
Total	354 kg	Caden Cahoy	28 April 2026	Pan American Championships	Panama City, Panama	
88 kg
Snatch	162 kg	Hutton Boles	6 December 2025	Virus Weightlifting Finals	Daytona Beach, United States	
Clean & Jerk	195 kg	Brandon Victorian	29 April 2026	Pan American Championships	Panama City, Panama	
Total	363 kg	Standard				
94 kg
Snatch	165 kg	Daniel Wiitanen	6 December 2025	Virus Weightlifting Finals	Daytona Beach, United States	
Clean & Jerk	195 kg	Standard				
Total	362 kg	Standard				

=== Men (2018–2025) ===
Event	Record	Athlete	Date	Meet	Place	Ref
55 kg
Snatch	110 kg	Brey Kobashigawa	9 December 2018	American Open Series Final	Milwaukee, United States	
Clean & Jerk	134 kg	Gabe Chhum	28 June 2022	USA Championships	Las Vegas, United States	
Total	242 kg	Standard				
61 kg
Snatch	127 kg	Hampton Morris	2 April 2024	World Cup	Phuket, Thailand	
Clean & Jerk	176 kg	Hampton Morris	2 April 2024	World Cup	Phuket, Thailand	
Total	303 kg	Hampton Morris	2 April 2024	World Cup	Phuket, Thailand	
67 kg
Snatch	139 kg	Standard				
Clean & Jerk	179 kg	Hampton Morris	28 February 2025	Virus Senior Series 1	Columbus, United States	
Total	313 kg	Hampton Morris	28 February 2025	Virus Senior Series 1	Columbus, United States	
73 kg
Snatch	155 kg	CJ Cummings	21 April 2021	Pan American Championships	Santo Domingo, Dominican Republic	
Clean & Jerk	193 kg	CJ Cummings	27 June 2019	Pan American Junior Championships	Havana, Cuba	
Total	347 kg	CJ Cummings	27 June 2019	Pan American Junior Championships	Havana, Cuba	
81 kg
Snatch	163 kg	Standard				
Clean & Jerk	200 kg	Harrison Maurus	5 November 2018	World Championships	Ashgabat, Turkmenistan	
Total	361 kg	Harrison Maurus	31 July 2021	Olympic Games	Tokyo, Japan	
89 kg
Snatch	170 kg	Standard				
Clean & Jerk	207 kg	Standard				
Total	370 kg	Nathan Damron	11 December 2022	World Championships	Bogotá, Colombia	
96 kg
Snatch	174 kg	Standard				
Clean & Jerk	213 kg	Standard				
Total	380 kg	Standard				
102 kg
Snatch	177 kg	Wesley Kitts	16 June 2023	IWF Grand Prix	Havana, Cuba	
Clean & Jerk	218 kg	Standard				
Total	388 kg	Wesley Kitts	16 June 2023	IWF Grand Prix	Havana, Cuba	
109 kg
Snatch	177 kg	Wesley Kitts	3 August 2021	Olympic Games	Tokyo, Japan	
Clean & Jerk	223 kg	Wesley Kitts	26 April 2019	Pan American Championships	Guatemala City, Guatemala	
Total	399 kg	Wesley Kitts	26 April 2019	Pan American Championships	Guatemala City, Guatemala	
+109 kg
Snatch	197.5 kg	Shane Hamman	26 November 2002	World Championships	Warsaw, Poland	
Clean & Jerk	237.5 kg	Shane Hamman	25 August 2004	Olympic Games	Athens, Greece	
Total	430 kg	Shane Hamman	25 August 2004	Olympic Games	Athens, Greece	

=== Men (1998–2018) ===
Event	Record	Athlete	Date	Meet	Place	Ref
56 kg
Snatch	112 kg	Darren Barnes	12 December 2014	American Open	Washington, United States	
Clean & Jerk	136 kg	Darren Barnes	21 September 2015	IWF Grand Prix	Fuzhou, China	
Total	245 kg	Darren Barnes	2 April 2014	Junior Pan Americana Championships	Reno, United States	
62 kg
Snatch	125 kg	Derrick Johnson	8 December 2017	American Open	Anaheim, United States	
Clean & Jerk	153 kg	Clarence Cummings	19 July 2014	National Championships	Salt Lake City, United States	
Total	273 kg	Derrick Johnson	8 December 2017	American Open	Anaheim, United States	
69 kg
Snatch	144 kg	Clarence Cummings	15 May 2018	Pan American Championships	Santo Domingo, Dominican Republic	
Clean & Jerk	185 kg	Clarence Cummings	7 April 2017	Youth World Championships	Bangkok, Thailand	
Total	324 kg	Clarence Cummings	15 May 2018	Pan American Championships	Santo Domingo, Dominican Republic	
77 kg
Snatch	157.5 kg	Oscar Chaplin III	21 July 1999		New Orleans, United States	
Clean & Jerk	193 kg	Harrison Maurus	2 December 2017	World Championships	Anaheim, United States	
Total	348 kg	Harrison Maurus	2 December 2017	World Championships	Anaheim, United States	
85 kg
Snatch	166 kg	Oscar Chaplin III	7 December 2002	American Open	Savannah, United States	
Clean & Jerk	203 kg	Kendrick Farris	23 May 2010	Pan American Championships	Guatemala City, Guatemala	
Total	362 kg	Kendrick Farris	15 August 2008	Olympic Games	Beijing, China	
94 kg
Snatch	173 kg	Colin Burns	11 December 2016	American Open Championships	Orlando, United States	
Clean & Jerk	211 kg	Kendrick Farris	12 July 2013	Summer Universiade	Kazan, Russia	
Total	377 kg	Kendrick Farris	7 May 2016	National Championships	Salt Lake City, United States	
105 kg
Snatch	176 kg	Wes Kitts	4 December 2017	World Championships	Anaheim, United States	
Clean & Jerk	220 kg	Wes Barnett	28 November 1999	World Championships	Athens, Greece	
Total	390 kg	Wes Barnett	28 November 1999	World Championships	Athens, Greece	
+105 kg
Snatch	197.5 kg	Shane Hamman	26 November 2002	World Championships	Warsaw, Poland	
Clean & Jerk	237.5 kg	Shane Hamman	25 August 2004	Olympic Games	Athens, Greece	
Total	430 kg	Shane Hamman	25 August 2004	Olympic Games	Athens, Greece	

=== Women (2025–2026) ===
Event	Record	Athlete	Date	Meet	Place	Ref
48 kg
Snatch	82 kg	Standard				
Clean & Jerk	105 kg	Standard				
Total	193 kg	Standard				
58 kg
Snatch	96 kg	Miranda Ulrey	23 June 2026	USA Championships	Colorado Springs, United States	
Clean & Jerk	117 kg	Standard				
Total	214 kg	Standard				
63 kg
Snatch	110 kg	Sophia Shaft	26 June 2026	USA Championships	Colorado Springs, United States	
Clean & Jerk	134 kg	Sophia Shaft	26 June 2026	USA Championships	Colorado Springs, United States	
Total	244 kg	Sophia Shaft	26 June 2026	USA Championships	Colorado Springs, United States	

=== Women (2018–2025) ===
Event	Record	Athlete	Date	Meet	Place	Ref
45 kg
Snatch	82 kg	Standard				
Clean & Jerk	96 kg	Cicely Kyle	19 April 2021	Pan American Championships	Santo Domingo, Dominican Republic	
Total	181 kg	Standard				
49 kg
Snatch	89 kg	Jourdan Delacruz	20 April 2021	Pan American Championships	Santo Domingo, Dominican Republic	
Clean & Jerk	112 kg	Jourdan Delacruz	27 March 2023	Pan American Championships	Bariloche, Argentina	
Total	200 kg	Jourdan Delacruz	20 April 2021	Pan American Championships	Santo Domingo, Dominican Republic	
55 kg
Snatch	91 kg	Jourdan Delacruz	15 February 2019	Pan American Championships Trials	Lombard, United States	
Clean & Jerk	116 kg	Jourdan Delacruz	24 April 2019	Pan American Championships	Guatemala City, Guatemala	
Total	207 kg	Jourdan Delacruz	24 April 2019	Pan American Championships	Guatemala City, Guatemala	
59 kg
Snatch	100 kg	Danielle Gunnin	28 March 2023	Pan American Championships	Bariloche, Argentina	
Clean & Jerk	124 kg	Taylor Wilkins	12 June 2023	IWF Grand Prix	Havana, Cuba	
Total	221 kg	Taylor Wilkins	12 June 2023	IWF Grand Prix	Havana, Cuba	
64 kg
Snatch	102 kg	Mattie Sasser	29 July 2019	Pan American Games	Lima, Peru	
Clean & Jerk	130 kg	Mattie Sasser	29 July 2019	Pan American Games	Lima, Peru	
Total	232 kg	Mattie Sasser	29 July 2019	Pan American Games	Lima, Peru	
71 kg
Snatch	120 kg	Olivia Reeves	22 June 2024	USA Championships	Pittsburgh, United States	
Clean & Jerk	151 kg	Olivia Reeves	22 June 2024	USA Championships	Pittsburgh, United States	
Total	271 kg	Olivia Reeves	22 June 2024	USA Championships	Pittsburgh, United States	
76 kg
Snatch	113 kg	Ella Nicholson	24 September 2024	World Junior Championships	León, Spain	
Clean & Jerk	141 kg	Mattie Rogers	28 July 2022	Pan American Championships	Bogotá, Colombia	
Total	252 kg	Mattie Rogers	2 July 2022	USA Championships	Las Vegas, United States	
81 kg
Snatch	114 kg	Olivia Reeves	23 October 2023	Pan American Games	Santiago, Chile	
Clean & Jerk	145 kg	Katherine Vibert	9 April 2024	World Cup	Phuket, Thailand	
Total	258 kg	Olivia Reeves	23 October 2023	Pan American Games	Santiago, Chile	
87 kg
Snatch	110 kg	Standard				
Clean & Jerk	142 kg	Standard				
Total	250 kg	Standard				
+87 kg
Snatch	128 kg	Cheryl Haworth	18 May 2003	National Championships	Chattanooga, United States	
Clean & Jerk	164 kg	Mary Theisen-Lappen	28 February 2025	Virus Masters Series 1	Columbus, United States	
Total	290 kg	Sarah Robles	10 November 2018	World Championships	Ashgabat, Turkmenistan	

=== Women (1998–2018) ===
Event	Record	Athlete	Date	Meet	Place	Ref
48 kg
Snatch	83 kg	Morghan King	6 August 2016	Olympic Games	Rio de Janeiro, Brazil	
Clean & Jerk	102.5 kg	Tara Nott	21 July 2000	USA Olympic Tryouts	New Orleans, United States	
Total	185 kg	Tara Nott	21 July 2000	USA Olympic Tryouts	New Orleans, United States	
53 kg
Snatch	87 kg	Cortney Batchelor	17 March 2017	American Open Series I	Reno, United States	
Clean & Jerk	113 kg	Melanie Kosoff	24 April 1998	National Championships	Flagstaff, United States	
Total	194 kg	Caitlin Hogan	30 November 2017	World Championships	Anaheim, United States	
58 kg
Snatch	93 kg	Jessica Lucero	7 May 2016	National Championships	Salt Lake City, United States	
Clean & Jerk	116 kg	Jessica Lucero	12 May 2017	National Championships	Chicago, United States	
Total	208 kg	Jessica Lucero	7 May 2016	National Championships	Salt Lake City, United States	
63 kg
Snatch	100 kg	Natalie Woolfolk	25 June 2005	Pan American Championships	Shreveport, United States	
Clean & Jerk	125 kg	Geralee Vega	28 October 2013	World Championships	Wrocław, Poland	
Total	225 kg	Geralee Vega	28 October 2013	World Championships	Wrocław, Poland	
69 kg
Snatch	106 kg	Mattie Rogers	7 May 2016	National Championships	Salt Lake City, United States	
Clean & Jerk	134 kg	Mattie Rogers	13 May 2017	National Championships	Chicago, United States	
Total	239 kg	Mattie Rogers	8 June 2016	Pan American Championships	Cartagena, Colombia	
75 kg
Snatch	108 kg	Quiana Welch	10 December 2017	American Open	Anaheim, United States	
Clean & Jerk	138 kg	Jenny Arthur	27 November 2015	World Championships	Houston, United States	
Total	244 kg	Jenny Arthur	27 November 2015	World Championships	Houston, United States	
90 kg
Snatch	110 kg	Record standard	1 January 2017			
Clean & Jerk	142 kg	Record standard	1 January 2017			
Total	251 kg	Record standard	1 January 2017			
+90 kg
Snatch	128 kg	Cheryl Haworth	18 May 2003	National Championships	Chattanooga, United States	
Clean & Jerk	161 kg	Cheryl Haworth	27 June 2005	Pan American Championships	Shreveport, United States	
Total	287 kg	Cheryl Haworth	27 June 2005	Pan American Championships	Shreveport, United States	

== See also ==
- List of Olympic weightlifters of the United States
