= Weightlifting at the 2025 National Games of China =

- Venue: Shilong Middle School Gymnasium, Dongguan
- Dates: 10–20 November 2025

Weightlifting was part of the 2025 National Games of China held in Guangdong, Hong Kong and Macau, and was contested from November 10 to 20. Both men and women competed in the deprecated 2018-2025 IWF categories, as planning for this event began in 2021.

The competition program at the National Games mirrors that of the Olympic Games, as only medals for the total achieved were awarded, but not for individual lifts in either the snatch or clean and jerk. Likewise, an athlete failing to register a snatch result did not advance to the clean and jerk.

== Medal summary ==
=== Men ===
Event	Gold		Silver		Bronze	
55 kg	Zou Weibin; Hunan	272 kg	Wang Weidong; Guangdong	271 kg	Yao Chen; Fujian	267 kg
61 kg	Li Fabin; Fujian	306 kg	Ding Hongjie; Chongqing	293 kg	Qu Hongcheng; Hunan	290 kg
67 kg	Chen Jian; Zhejiang	330 kg	Cheng Jun; Chongqing	322 kg	Zhong Yuanlong; Guangxi	321 kg
73 kg	Shi Zhiyong; Zhejiang	346 kg	Lu Naigang; CSU	341 kg	Peng Zhenglin; Hunan	340 kg
81 kg	Lei Jiangqing; Guizhou	366 kg	Xiang Feiyang; Hubei	365 kg	Luo Chongyang; Sichuan	357 kg
89 kg	Tu Yi; Hubei	388 kg	Hu Yifan; Beijing	371 kg	Li Dayin; Chongqing	370 kg
96 kg	Qian Feixiang; Jiangsu	385 kg	Zhao Yongchao; Fujian	375 kg	Liu Xinxin; Shaanxi	371 kg
102 kg	Liu Huanhua; Tianjin	414 kg	Wang Zhihao; Unaffiliated	377 kg	Zou Yuanqing; Liaoning	372 kg
109 kg	Wang Guizhou; Shaanxi	384 kg	Shi Chanlong; Hunan	374 kg	Ren Xianglin; Jilin	372 kg
109+ kg	Zhang Xiliang; Hebei	412 kg	Liang Minhua; Guangxi	403 kg	Ai Yunan; Beijing	395 kg

=== Women ===
Event	Gold		Silver		Bronze	
45 kg	Zhao Jinlan; Guangxi	196 kg	Zhao Jinhong; Guangxi	194 kg	Chen Yarou; Shaanxi	190 kg
49 kg	Hou Zhihui; Hunan	203 kg	Deng Xiaofang; Hainan	201 kg	Yu Mengqian; Zhejiang	201 kg
55 kg	Wei Tingna; Fujian	223 kg	Su Tingting; Chongqing	222 kg	Liu Mengjia; Chongqing	221 kg
59 kg	Luo Shifang; Hunan	235 kg	Pei Xinyi; Zhejiang	225 kg	Luo Xiaomin; Chongqing	224 kg
64 kg	Fang Lin; CSU	249 kg	Li Shuang; Chongqing	241 kg	Yang Liuyue; Fujian	238 kg
71 kg	Yang Qiuxia; Sichuan	263 kg	He Renxiu; Fujian	250 kg	Pan Zhixin; Guangdong	249 kg
76 kg	Liao Guifang; Fujian	271 kg	Qin Lirong; Hunan	246 kg	Li Mengfan; Jilin	245 kg
81 kg	Peng Cuiting; Guangdong	271 kg	Liang Xiaomei; Guangxi	266 kg	Wu Yan; Jiangsu	263 kg
87 kg	Wang Zhouyu; Hubei	270 kg	Ao Hui; Unaffiliated	263 kg	Bao Yangxi; Beijing	260 kg
87+ kg	Li Yan; Heilongjiang	320 kg	Li Wenwen; Fujian	313 kg	Sun Yongjie; Liaoning	293 kg
