= India at the 2026 World Weightlifting Championships =

- Flag of India
- IOC code: IND
- NOC: Indian Weightlifting Federation

in Ningbo, China 27 October 2026 – 8 November 2026
- Competitors: 5 (1 man and 4 women) in 1 sport
- Medals: Gold 0 Silver 0 Bronze 0 Total 0

India competed at the 2026 World Weightlifting Championships in Ningbo, China, from 27 October to 8 November 2026. The tournament serves as the opening mandatory qualification event in Period 1 of the Olympic Qualification System for the 2028 Los Angeles Olympic Games.

India initially selected a 6-member contingent for the tournament. However, the final traveling roster was reduced to 5 athletes after male lifter Pesi Charu (65 kg category) was forced to withdraw from the trip. Charu, who hails from Arunachal Pradesh, had to abandon his campaign after being issued a stapled visa by the Chinese embassy, a format not recognized by the Indian government.

The remaining 5-member contingent was spearheaded by Olympic medalist Mirabai Chanu, who transitioned up to the women's 53 kg class following the removal of her previous 49 kg and 48 kg weight divisions from the 2028 Olympic programme.

== Competitors ==
The following is the list of number of competitors participating at the Championships per weight category.

| Event | Men | Women | Total |
|---|---|---|---|
| 53 kg | 0 | 2 | 2 |
| 61 kg | 0 | 2 | 2 |
| +110 kg | 1 | 0 | 1 |
| Total | 1 | 4 | 5 |

== Results ==
The list of final entries and group placements for the competing Indian lifters was confirmed by the International Weightlifting Federation (IWF) ahead of the opening sessions in Ningbo.

Men

| Athlete | Event | Snatch (kg) | | | | Clean & Jerk (kg) | | | | Total | Rank |
| Athlete | Event | 1 | 2 | 3 | Rank | 1 | 2 | 3 | Rank | Total | Rank |
|---|---|---|---|---|---|---|---|---|---|---|---|
| Lovepreet Singh | +110 kg | ~~170~~ | 170 | ~~174~~ | 16 | ~~205~~ | 205 | ~~213~~ | 21 | 375 | 19 |

Women

| Athlete | Event | Snatch (kg) | | | | Clean & Jerk (kg) | | | | Total | Rank |
| Athlete | Event | 1 | 2 | 3 | Rank | 1 | 2 | 3 | Rank | Total | Rank |
|---|---|---|---|---|---|---|---|---|---|---|---|
| Mirabai Chanu | –53 kg | DNS | | | | | | | | | |
| Gyaneshwari Devi | –53 kg | 85 | ~~88~~ | 88 | 9 | 106 | 110 | ~~112~~ | 9 | 198 | 8 |
| Usha | –61 kg | 90 | ~~93~~ | 93 | 24 | 115 | ~~119~~ | ~~121~~ | 16 | 212 | 19 |
| Nirupama Devi | –61 kg | ~~91~~ | 91 | ~~93~~ | 27 | 120 | ~~124~~ | ~~124~~ | 13 | 211 | 21 |
