= Zhang Haiqin =

Chinese weightlifter (born 2005)

Personal information
- Born: 6 January 2005 (age 21)

Sport
- Country: China
- Sport: Weightlifting
- Weight class: 53 kg
Medal record
Women's weightlifting
Representing China
World Championships
Gold medal – first place	2026 Ningbo	53 kg
Asian Championships
Gold medal – first place	2025 Jiangshan	55 kg

Zhang Haiqin (Chinese: 张海琴; born 6 January 2005), is a Chinese weightlifter. She is a 2026 World Weightlifting Championships gold medalist.

== Career ==
In May 2025, Zhang competed at the 2025 Asian Weightlifting Championships and won a gold medal in the 55 kg category. She opened the event with 99 kg in the snatch. She followed it up with 126 kg in the clean and jerk, before finishing with a total lift of 225 kg. She set junior world records, and Asian junior records in all three categories.

In August 2026, she competed at the National Grand Prix in Rongchang, Chongqing, China and won a gold medal in the 53 kg category. She opened the event with 101 kg in the snatch. She followed it up with 126 kg in the clean and jerk, before finishing with a total lift of 227 kg. She set Chinese records all three categories. In October 2026, she competed at the 2026 World Weightlifting Championships and won a gold medal in the 53 kg category. She opened the event with 98 kg in the snatch. She followed it up with 123 kg in the clean and jerk, before finishing with a total lift of 221 kg. She finished two kilograms shy of the total world record benchmark set for the new Olympic cycle.
