= Miranda Ulrey =

American weightlifter (born 2004)

Personal information
- Born: 2004 (age 21–22) Grantville, Pennsylvania, U.S.

Sport
- Country: United States
- Sport: Weightlifting
- Weight class: 58 kg
- Club: Fourteen Forty Collective
Medal record
Women's weightlifting
Representing the United States
World Championships
Silver medal – second place	2026 Ningbo	53 kg
Bronze medal – third place	2025 Førde	58 kg
Pan American Championships
Gold medal – first place	2025 Cali	58 kg
Gold medal – first place	2026 Panama City	53 kg
Junior World Championships
Gold medal – first place	2024 León	59 kg

Miranda Ulrey (born 2004) is an American weightlifter. She won the bronze medal in the snatch in the women's 58 kg event at the 2025 World Weightlifting Championships, held in Førde, Norway.

Ulrey also won the gold medal in the women's 58 kg event at the 2025 Pan American Weightlifting Championships, held in Cali, Colombia. The following year, she won the championship again in Panama City, Panama, this time in the women's 53 kg event.
