= 2025 Asian Weightlifting Championships =

- Host city: Jiangshan, China
- Dates: 9–15 May 2025
- Main venue: Hushan Sports Park

The 2025 Asian Weightlifting Championships were held in Jiangshan, China, from 9 to 15 May 2025.

== Medal table ==
Ranking by Big (Total result) medals

* Host nation (China)

Rank	Nation	Gold	Silver	Bronze	Total
1	China*	10	6	3	19
2	North Korea	4	0	0	4
3	Iran	2	0	1	3
4	Uzbekistan	1	1	1	3
4	Vietnam	1	1	1	3
6	Indonesia	1	1	0	2
6	Thailand	1	1	0	2
8	South Korea	0	4	7	11
9	Chinese Taipei	0	3	3	6
10	Philippines	0	2	1	3
11	Kazakhstan	0	1	1	2
12	Saudi Arabia	0	0	1	1
12	Turkmenistan	0	0	1	1
Totals (13 entries)		20	20	20	60

Ranking by all medals: Big (Total result) and Small (Snatch and Clean & Jerk)

Rank	Nation	Gold	Silver	Bronze	Total
1	China*	31	15	11	57
2	North Korea	9	3	0	12
3	Iran	5	2	1	8
4	South Korea	3	11	15	29
5	Uzbekistan	3	3	6	12
6	Thailand	3	3	0	6
7	Indonesia	3	2	2	7
8	Vietnam	2	3	5	10
9	Turkmenistan	1	1	4	6
10	Chinese Taipei	0	8	6	14
11	Philippines	0	7	3	10
12	Kazakhstan	0	2	4	6
13	Saudi Arabia	0	0	3	3
Totals (13 entries)		60	60	60	180

== Medal summary ==
=== Men ===
Event	Gold		Silver		Bronze	
55 kg
Snatch	Lại Gia Thành; Vietnam	120 kg	Wang Weidong; China	119 kg	Mansour Al-Saleem; Saudi Arabia	117 kg
Clean & Jerk	Wang Weidong; China	146 kg	Fernando Agad; Philippines	141 kg	Lại Gia Thành; Vietnam	140 kg
Total	Wang Weidong; China	265 kg	Lại Gia Thành; Vietnam	260 kg	Mansour Al-Saleem; Saudi Arabia	254 kg
61 kg
Snatch	Wang Hao; China	142 kg	Pak Myong-jin; North Korea	136 kg	Wang Min; China	134 kg
Clean & Jerk	Pak Myong-jin; North Korea	170 kg	Wang Hao; China	163 kg	Wang Min; China	160 kg
Total	Pak Myong-jin; North Korea	306 kg	Wang Hao; China	305 kg	Wang Min; China	294 kg
67 kg
Snatch	Zheng Xinhao; China	147 kg	Trần Minh Trí; Vietnam	146 kg	Khusinboy Matrasulov; Uzbekistan	140 kg
Clean & Jerk	Bae Moon-su; South Korea	174 kg	Trần Minh Trí; Vietnam	172 kg	Zheng Xinhao; China	170 kg
Total	Trần Minh Trí; Vietnam	318 kg	Zheng Xinhao; China	317 kg	Bae Moon-su; South Korea	306 kg
73 kg
Snatch	Rahmat Erwin Abdullah; Indonesia	155 kg	Bunýad Raşidow; Turkmenistan	150 kg	Bektimur Reýimow; Turkmenistan	148 kg
Clean & Jerk	Rahmat Erwin Abdullah; Indonesia	205 kg WR	Wu Haifeng; China	189 kg	Petr Khrebtov; Kazakhstan	187 kg
Total	Rahmat Erwin Abdullah; Indonesia	360 kg	Wu Haifeng; China	334 kg	Petr Khrebtov; Kazakhstan	333 kg
81 kg
Snatch	Luo Chongyang; China	162 kg	Rizki Juniansyah; Indonesia	161 kg	Son Hyeon-ho; South Korea	157 kg
Clean & Jerk	Son Hyeon-ho; South Korea	200 kg	Luo Chongyang; China	200 kg	Rizki Juniansyah; Indonesia	197 kg
Total	Luo Chongyang; China	362 kg	Rizki Juniansyah; Indonesia	358 kg	Son Hyeon-ho; South Korea	357 kg
89 kg
Snatch	Li Dayin; China	176 kg	Ro Kwang-ryol; North Korea	168 kg	Yegor Sherer; Kazakhstan	165 kg
Clean & Jerk	Ro Kwang-ryol; North Korea	212 kg	Pan Yunhua; China	209 kg AJR	Li Dayin; China	203 kg
Total	Ro Kwang-ryol; North Korea	380 kg	Li Dayin; China	379 kg	Pan Yunhua; China	372 kg AJR
96 kg
Snatch	Alireza Moeini; Iran	180 kg	Ali Alipour; Iran	174 kg	Qian Feixiang; China	173 kg
Clean & Jerk	Ali Alipour; Iran	216 kg	Won Jong-beom; South Korea	215 kg	Qian Feixiang; China	207 kg
Total	Ali Alipour; Iran	390 kg	Won Jong-beom; South Korea	385 kg	Alireza Moeini; Iran	383 kg
102 kg
Snatch	Döwranbek Hasanbaýew; Turkmenistan	182 kg	Liu Huanhua; China	180 kg	Artyom Antropov; Kazakhstan	165 kg
Clean & Jerk	Liu Huanhua; China	230 kg	Artyom Antropov; Kazakhstan	221 kg	Döwranbek Hasanbaýew; Turkmenistan	195 kg
Total	Liu Huanhua; China	410 kg	Artyom Antropov; Kazakhstan	386 kg	Döwranbek Hasanbaýew; Turkmenistan	377 kg
109 kg
Snatch	Akbar Djuraev; Uzbekistan	183 kg	Sharofiddin Amriddinov; Uzbekistan	181 kg	Jang Yeon-hak; South Korea	178 kg
Clean & Jerk	Akbar Djuraev; Uzbekistan	223 kg	Sharofiddin Amriddinov; Uzbekistan	214 kg	Ali Al-Khazal; Saudi Arabia	212 kg
Total	Akbar Djuraev; Uzbekistan	406 kg	Sharofiddin Amriddinov; Uzbekistan	395 kg	Jang Yeon-hak; South Korea	390 kg
+109 kg
Snatch	Hwang Woo-man; South Korea	196 kg	Ayat Sharifi; Iran	195 kg	Amir Abdullaev; Uzbekistan	182 kg
Clean & Jerk	Ayat Sharifi; Iran	227 kg	Hwang Woo-man; South Korea	225 kg	Lee Yang-jae; South Korea	220 kg
Total	Ayat Sharifi; Iran	422 kg	Hwang Woo-man; South Korea	421 kg	Lee Yang-jae; South Korea	396 kg

=== Women ===
Event	Gold		Silver		Bronze	
45 kg
Snatch	Zhao Jinhong; China	90 kg WR	Hong Zi-yu; Chinese Taipei	73 kg	Phạm Đình Thi; Vietnam	68 kg
Clean & Jerk	Zhao Jinhong; China	100 kg	Hong Zi-yu; Chinese Taipei	88 kg	Phạm Đình Thi; Vietnam	85 kg
Total	Zhao Jinhong; China	190 kg	Hong Zi-yu; Chinese Taipei	161 kg	Phạm Đình Thi; Vietnam	153 kg
49 kg
Snatch	Thanyathon Sukcharoen; Thailand	91 kg	Rosegie Ramos; Philippines	90 kg	Xiang Linxiang; China	86 kg
Clean & Jerk	Thanyathon Sukcharoen; Thailand	109 kg	Rosegie Ramos; Philippines	107 kg	Xiang Linxiang; China	103 kg
Total	Thanyathon Sukcharoen; Thailand	200 kg	Rosegie Ramos; Philippines	197 kg	Xiang Linxiang; China	189 kg
55 kg
Snatch	Zhang Haiqin; China	99 kg WJR	Chen Guan-ling; Chinese Taipei	83 kg	Juliana Klarisa; Indonesia	82 kg
Clean & Jerk	Zhang Haiqin; China	126 kg WJR	Chen Guan-ling; Chinese Taipei	110 kg	Hu Chia-chi; Chinese Taipei	110 kg
Total	Zhang Haiqin; China	225 kg WJR	Chen Guan-ling; Chinese Taipei	194 kg	Hu Chia-chi; Chinese Taipei	190 kg
59 kg
Snatch	Kim Il-gyong; North Korea	103 kg	Suratwadee Yodsarn; Thailand	99 kg	Quàng Thị Tâm; Vietnam	98 kg
Clean & Jerk	Kim Il-gyong; North Korea	132 kg	Suratwadee Yodsarn; Thailand	126 kg	Kuo Hsing-chun; Chinese Taipei	125 kg
Total	Kim Il-gyong; North Korea	235 kg	Suratwadee Yodsarn; Thailand	225 kg	Kuo Hsing-chun; Chinese Taipei	220 kg
64 kg
Snatch	Li Shuang; China	105 kg	Elreen Ando; Philippines	102 kg	Mun Min-hee; South Korea	94 kg
Clean & Jerk	Li Shuang; China	134 kg	Elreen Ando; Philippines	130 kg	Mun Min-hee; South Korea	120 kg
Total	Li Shuang; China	239 kg	Elreen Ando; Philippines	232 kg	Mun Min-hee; South Korea	214 kg
71 kg
Snatch	Yang Qiuxia; China	122 kg WR	Song Kuk-hyang; North Korea	121 kg	Kristel Macrohon; Philippines	105 kg
Clean & Jerk	Song Kuk-hyang; North Korea	155 kg WR	Yang Qiuxia; China	140 kg	Kristel Macrohon; Philippines	131 kg
Total	Song Kuk-hyang; North Korea	276 kg WR	Yang Qiuxia; China	262 kg	Kristel Macrohon; Philippines	236 kg
76 kg
Snatch	Liao Guifang; China	125 kg WR	Chen Wen-huei; Chinese Taipei	109 kg	Kim Su-hyeon; South Korea	100 kg
Clean & Jerk	Liao Guifang; China	154 kg	Kim Su-hyeon; South Korea	134 kg	Chen Wen-huei; Chinese Taipei	133 kg
Total	Liao Guifang; China	279 kg WR	Chen Wen-huei; Chinese Taipei	242 kg	Kim Su-hyeon; South Korea	234 kg
81 kg
Snatch	Wu Yan; China	116 kg	Kim I-seul; South Korea	105 kg	Rigina Adashbaeva; Uzbekistan	104 kg
Clean & Jerk	Wu Yan; China	147 kg	Kim I-seul; South Korea	130 kg	Madina Fayzullaeva; Uzbekistan	121 kg
Total	Wu Yan; China	263 kg	Kim I-seul; South Korea	235 kg	Rigina Adashbaeva; Uzbekistan	224 kg
87 kg
Snatch	Tian Dongping; China	118 kg	Jiang Yujia; China	113 kg	Tursunoy Jabborova; Uzbekistan	108 kg
Clean & Jerk	Tian Dongping; China	141 kg	Jiang Yujia; China	140 kg	Anamjan Rüstamowa; Turkmenistan	138 kg
Total	Tian Dongping; China	259 kg	Jiang Yujia; China	253 kg	Lo Ying-yuan; Chinese Taipei	246 kg
+87 kg
Snatch	Li Yan; China	140 kg	Park Hye-jeong; South Korea	125 kg	Son Young-hee; South Korea	121 kg
Clean & Jerk	Li Yan; China	170 kg	Son Young-hee; South Korea	161 kg	Park Hye-jeong; South Korea	160 kg
Total	Li Yan; China	310 kg	Park Hye-jeong; South Korea	285 kg	Son Young-hee; South Korea	282 kg

== Team ranking ==
=== Men ===
Rank	Team	Points
1	China	749
2	South Korea	513
3	Kazakhstan	440
4	Uzbekistan	417
5	Chinese Taipei	388
6	Saudi Arabia	368

=== Women ===
Rank	Team	Points
1	China	810
2	Chinese Taipei	673
3	South Korea	663
4	Uzbekistan	318
5	Chinese Taipei	300
6	Vietnam	262

== Participating nations ==
A total of 170 competitors from 26 nations participated.

- Bahrain (1)
- Bangladesh (4)
- China (20)
- Chinese Taipei (19)
- Hong Kong (2)
- India (2)
- Indonesia (10)
- Iran (3)
- Jordan (1)
- Kazakhstan (14)
- Kyrgyzstan (2)
- Malaysia (6)
- Mongolia (5)
- Oman (2)
- Philippines (4)
- Palestine (1)
- North Korea (4)
- Saudi Arabia (7)
- Singapore (9)
- South Korea (20)
- Tajikistan (1)
- Thailand (3)
- Turkmenistan (7)
- United Arab Emirates (5)
- Uzbekistan (11)
- Vietnam (7)
