= Liu Huanhua =

Chinese weightlifter (born 2001)

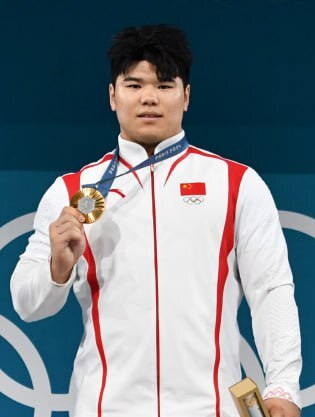
- Liu at the 2024 Summer Olympics

Personal information
- Nickname: Gigachad
- Nationality: Chinese
- Born: 20 August 2001 (age 25) Jiahe County, Chenzhou, Hunan, China
- Height: 183 cm (6 ft 0 in)

Sport
- Country: China
- Sport: Weightlifting
- Event: –110 kg (formerly –81,–89,–96,–102)
- Club: Tianjin Province

Achievements and titles
- Personal bests: Snatch: 190 kg (2026); Clean & Jerk: 233 kg (2023, GR); Total: 420 kg (2026)
Medal record
Men's weightlifting
Representing China
Olympic Games
Gold medal – first place	2024 Paris	102 kg
World Championships
Gold medal – first place	2023 Riyadh	102 kg
Bronze medal – third place	2022 Bogotá	89 kg
IWF World Cup
Gold medal – first place	2024 Phuket	102 kg
Asian Games
Gold medal – first place	2022 Hangzhou	109 kg
Bronze medal – third place	2026 Aichi–Nagoya	110 kg
Asian Championships
Gold medal – first place	2023 Jinju	96 kg
Gold medal – first place	2025 Jiangshan	102 kg
Gold medal – first place	2026 Gandhinagar	110 kg
National Games of China
Bronze medal – third place	2021 Shaanxi	81 kg

Liu Huanhua (Chinese: 刘焕华; pinyin: Liú Huànhuá; born 20 August 2001) is a Chinese weightlifter currently competing in the men's 110 kg category. He also holds world records in the former 102 kg category.

Liu won a gold medal in the men's 102 kg category at the 2024 Summer Olympics by lifting total of 406 kg. He became the first male weightlifting Olympic champion from China that weighed more than 100 kg.

== Career ==
=== Early career ===
Liu became involved in the sport of weightlifting in Chenzhou at the age of 13, where he was soon identified and drafted by the coach of the Tianjin weightlifting team.

His first recorded appearance was at the 2018 China Youth Championships, competing in the men's 77 kg class. He finished first in both the snatch and clean and jerk, winning a gold medal.

In 2021, Liu advanced to the men's 81 kg class at the 14th National Games of China held in Shaanxi. His performances resulted in a third-place finish overall.

=== 2022-2023 ===
The subsequent year saw Liu further increasing his weight class to the men's 89 kg, where he competed in the 2022 World Weightlifting Championships held in Bogotá. He finished in sixth place in the snatch event and third in the clean and jerk, culminating in an overall bronze medal finish.

In 2023, Liu continued his upward trajectory in weight class, participating in the men's 96 kg category at the 2023 Asian Weightlifting Championships in Jinju. His performances resulted with an overall first-place finish, earning him a gold medal. This was achieved through securing first place in the snatch and second place in the clean and jerk. Of note was his 89.48 kg bodyweight, which gave most of his competitors a body weight advantage.

Liu then made another jump in weight class for the 2023 World Weightlifting Championships in Riyadh, moving into the men's 102 kg. He ranked fourth in the snatch and first in the clean and jerk, ultimately resulting in an overall gold medal and marking his first world championship victory.

Liu again, made another jump in weight class for the 2022 Asian Games in Hangzhou, moving up to the men's 109 kg category. He ranked second in the snatch and first in the clean and jerk, getting a gold medal in the total. He weighed in at 100.8 kg making him eligible to compete in the 102 kg class but the Asian Games used the former Summer Olympic categories, thus forcing him to move up to a class in to the 109's. His lifts of 233 kg in the clean & jerk and 418 kg in the total would break the world standards and would set new world records but since he competed in the 109's his records would not be recorded in the 102's.

After yet another gain in bodyweight to compete in the 110 kg category, Liu managed to snatch 190 kg, a personal best, for gold at the 2026 Asian Championships. He also attempted a clean & jerk world record at 239 kg, which was declared a no lift due to press out. Nonetheless, his personal best total of 420 kg made him asian champion yet again.

== Major results ==
Year	Venue	Weight	Snatch (kg)				Clean & Jerk (kg)				Total	Rank
Year	Venue	Weight	1	2	3	Rank	1	2	3	Rank	Total	Rank
Olympic Games
2024	Paris, France	102 kg	178	183	186	—N/a	220	~~228~~	~~233~~	—N/a	406	1st place, gold medalist(s)
World Championships
2022	Bogotá, Colombia	89 kg	160	166	~~171~~	6	205	211	215	2nd place, silver medalist(s)	381	3rd place, bronze medalist(s)
2023	Riyadh, Saudi Arabia	102 kg	171	176	180	4	~~215~~	221	224	1st place, gold medalist(s)	404	1st place, gold medalist(s)
2026	Ningbo, China	110 kg	175	180	~~185~~	10	215	225	~~231~~	6	405	6
IWF World Cup
2024	Phuket, Thailand	102 kg	175	181	~~186~~	5	220	225	232 CWR	1st place, gold medalist(s)	413 CWR	1st place, gold medalist(s)
IWF Grand Prix
2023	Doha, Qatar	102 kg	170	~~176~~	176	4	210	222	~~225~~	2nd place, silver medalist(s)	398	2nd place, silver medalist(s)
Asian Games
2023	Hangzhou, China	109 kg	~~175~~	180	185	—N/a	215	227	233	—N/a	418	1st place, gold medalist(s)
2026	Nagoya, Japan	110 kg	170	180	185	—N/a	210	220	~~226~~	—N/a	405	3rd place, bronze medalist(s)
Asian Championships
2023	Jinju, South Korea	96 kg	~~170~~	170	175	1st place, gold medalist(s)	210	~~223~~	~~223~~	2nd place, silver medalist(s)	385	1st place, gold medalist(s)
2025	Jiangshan, China	102 kg	171	180	~~183~~	2nd place, silver medalist(s)	220	230	~~234~~	1st place, gold medalist(s)	410	1st place, gold medalist(s)
2026	Ghandinagar, India	110 kg	180	186	190	1st place, gold medalist(s)	220	230	~~239~~	2nd place, silver medalist(s)	420	1st place, gold medalist(s)
