= Alina Marushchak =

Ukrainian weightlifter (born 1997)

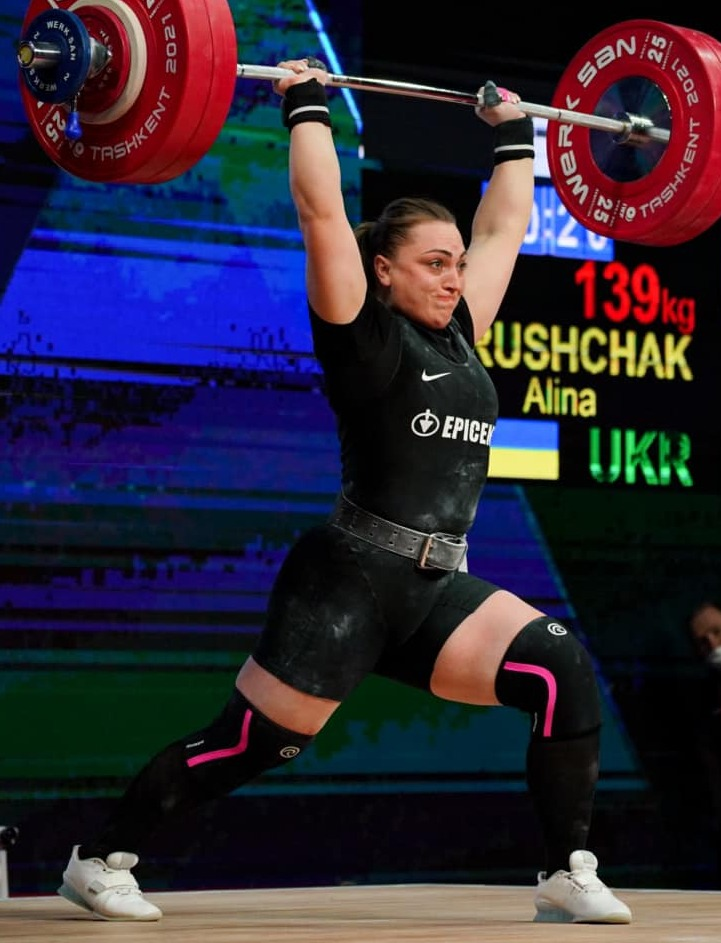

Personal information
- Born: 6 March 1997 (age 29) Pylypy-Khrebtiyivski, Kamianets-Podilskyi Raion, Khmelnytskyi Oblast

Sport
- Country: Ukraine
- Sport: Weightlifting
- Weight class: 81 kg
Medal record
Women's weightlifting
Representing Ukraine
World Championships
Gold medal – first place	2021 Tashkent	81 kg
European Championships
Gold medal – first place	2021 Moscow	81 kg
Silver medal – second place	2022 Tirana	81 kg
Representing Bahrain
World Championships
Silver medal – second place	2026 Ningbo	86 kg
Asian Games
Silver medal – second place	2026 Aichi–Nagoya	86 kg
Asian Championships
Silver medal – second place	2026 Gandhinagar	86 kg

Alina Marushchak (born 6 March 1997 in Pylypy-Khrebtiyivski, Khmelnytskyi Oblast) is a Ukrainian and Bahraini weightlifter. In 2021, she won the gold medal in the women's 81 kg event at both the World Weightlifting Championships in Tashkent, Uzbekistan and the European Weightlifting Championships in Moscow, Russia.

She also won the silver medal in the under-23 women's 71 kg event at the 2019 European Junior & U23 Weightlifting Championships in Bucharest, Romania.

Marushchak won silver medal at the 2022 European Championships in Tirana, Albania, finishing second behind her team fellow Iryna Dekha.

In March 2023, she tested positive for a banned substance.

== Major results ==
Year	Venue	Weight	Snatch (kg)				Clean & Jerk (kg)				Total	Rank
Year	Venue	Weight	1	2	3	Rank	1	2	3	Rank	Total	Rank
World Championships
2021	Tashkent, Uzbekistan	81 kg	108	111	113	1st place, gold medalist(s)	131	135	~~139~~	1st place, gold medalist(s)	248	1st place, gold medalist(s)
2022	Bogotá, Colombia	81 kg	116	119	~~121~~	2nd place, silver medalist(s)	137	~~142~~	~~142~~	7	256	6
European Championships
2021	Moscow, Russia	81 kg	103	106	109	1st place, gold medalist(s)	122	127	~~131~~	3rd place, bronze medalist(s)	236	1st place, gold medalist(s)
2022	Tirana, Albania	81 kg	108	~~112~~	~~113~~	2nd place, silver medalist(s)	127	~~134~~	~~137~~	3rd place, bronze medalist(s)	235	2nd place, silver medalist(s)
European U23 Championships
2019	Bucharest, Romania	71 kg	93	98	101	1st place, gold medalist(s)	111	117	124	2nd place, silver medalist(s)	225	2nd place, silver medalist(s)
