= Yang Qiuxia (weightlifter) =

Chinese weightlifter (born 2002)

Personal information
- Born: July 29, 2002 (age 24)
- Weight: 71 kg (157 lb)

Sport
- Country: China
- Sport: Weightlifting
- Event: Women's 71 kg
Medal record
Representing China
World Championships
Gold medal – first place	2026 Ningbo	–77 kg
Bronze medal – third place	2024 Manama	–71 kg
Asian Championships
Gold medal – first place	2022 Manama	–71 kg
Silver medal – second place	2025 Jiangshan	–71 kg
National Games of China
Gold medal – first place	2025 Guangdong	–71 kg

Yang Qiuxia (Chinese: 杨秋霞; born 29 July 2002 in Muchuan), is a Chinese weightlifter. She won medals at World and Asian championships and is the snatch world record holder in the 71kg category.

She began the sport in 2015.
