= Weightlifting at the 2021 National Games of China =

Weightlifting was part of the 2021 National Games of China held in Shaanxi. Men and women competed in fourteen weight classes which were also contested at the 2020 Tokyo Olympic Games

The competition program at the National Games mirrors that of the Olympic Games as only medals for the total achieved are awarded, but not for individual lifts in either the snatch or clean and jerk. Likewise an athlete failing to register a snatch result cannot advance to the clean and jerk.

== Men ==
Event	Gold		Silver		Bronze	
61 kg	Li Fabin; Fujian	311 kg	Wang Hao; Fujian	307 kg	Ding Hongjie; Chongqing	306 kg
67 kg	Chen Lijun; Hunan	332 kg	Wang Zhong; Shanxi	324 kg	Wu Chao; Tianjin	324 kg
73 kg	Shi Zhiyong; Zhejiang	365 kg	Wei Yinting; Guangxi	353 kg	Yuan Chengfei; Fujian	341 kg
81 kg	Li Dayin; Chongqing	364 kg	Lu Delin; Shaanxi	363 kg	Liu Huanhua; Tianjin	360 kg
96 kg	Tian Tao; Hubei	386 kg	Sun Wei; Hunan	379 kg	Zhao Yongchao; Fujian	378 kg
109 kg	Yang Zhe; Shandong	411 kg	Wu Changsheng; Guangxi	393 kg	Shi Chanlong; Hunan	386 kg
109+ kg	Ai Yunan; Beijing	422 kg	Wang Dahe; Hubei	421 kg	Zhou Xin; Jilin	418 kg

== Women ==
Event	Gold		Silver		Bronze	
49 kg	Hou Zhihui; Hunan	214 kg	Jiang Huihua; Guangxi	213 kg	Wang Jiali; Hunan	205 kg
55 kg	Su Tingting; Sichuan	225 kg	Yu Linglong; Guangxi	223 kg	Chen Shuying; Guangdong	222 kg
59 kg	Luo Shifang; Hunan	241 kg	Xiang Qiuxiang; Shaanxi	231 kg	Zhao Xiuyun; Guangdong	231 kg
64 kg	Zeng Tiantian; Guangdong	246 kg	Yang Yannan; Hunan	245 kg	Yuan Wangjian; Sichuan	241 kg
76 kg	Xiang Yanmei; Hunan	275 kg	Liao Guifang; Fujian	264 kg	Peng Cuiting; Guangdong	263 kg
87 kg	Wang Zhouyu; Hubei	273 kg	Ao Hui; Jiangxi	270 kg	Liang Xiaomei; Guangxi	269 kg
87+ kg	Li Wenwen; Fujian	320 kg	Meng Suping; Anhui	302 kg	Fan Yuxin; Jilin	295 kg
