= Zhao Jinhong =

Chinese weightlifter (born 2001)

Personal information
- Born: May 26, 2001 (age 25)
- Weight: 45–49 kg (99–108 lb)

Sport
- Country: China
- Sport: Weightlifting
- Event: Women's 45 kg
Medal record
Representing China
World Championships
Gold medal – first place	2024 Manama	–45 kg
Silver medal – second place	2026 Ningbo	–49 kg
Asian Championships
Gold medal – first place	2025 Jiangshan	–45 kg
Junior World Championships
Gold medal – first place	2019 Suva	–49 kg
Youth World Championships
Gold medal – first place	2016 Penang	–48 kg
National Games of China
Silver medal – second place	2025 Guangdong	–45 kg

Zhao Jinhong (Chinese: 赵金红; born 26 May 2001 in Yulin, Guangxi) is a Chinese weightlifter. She won the World and Asian championships in 2024 and 2025 respectively and holds all three world records in the 45 kg category.

She began the sport in 2012 at Yulin sports school. Her younger sister Zhao Jinlan is also a high level weightlifter.
