= Rigina Adashbaeva =

Uzbekistani weightlifter (born 2001)

Rigina Adashbaeva (born 29 October 2001) is an Uzbek weightlifter. Adashbaeva won three silver medals at the 2024 Asian Weightlifting Championships in the snatch, clean & jerk, and overall in the women's 81 kg category. She represented Uzbekistan at the 2024 Summer Olympics, placing 8th overall in the women's 81kg weightlifting event. At the 2025 Asian Weightlifting Championships, she received bronze medals in the snatch and the overall total in the women's 81 kg division. Adashbaeva competed at the 2025 Islamic Solidarity Games, who won silver in the snatch, clean and jerk, and overall total in the women's 86 kg and under category.
