= Peng Cuiting =

Chinese weightlifter (born 2001)

Personal information
- Nationality: Chinese
- Born: 31 July 2001 (age 25) Shilong, Guangdong, China
- Weight: 76 kg (168 lb)

Sport
- Country: China
- Sport: Weightlifting
- Event: 76 kg

Achievements and titles
- Personal bests: Snatch: 115 kg (2022); Clean and jerk: 128 kg (2022); Total: 243 kg (2022)
Medal record
Women's weightlifting
Representing China
World Championships
| Silver medal – second place | 2026 Ningbo | 77 kg |
Asian Championships
| Gold medal – first place | 2022 Manama | 76 kg |
| Gold medal – first place | 2026 Gandhinagar | 86 kg |
National Games of China
| Bronze medal – third place | 2021 Shaanxi | 76 kg |

Peng Cuiting (Chinese: 彭翠婷; born 31 July 2001) is a Chinese weightlifter, competing in the women's 76 kg category.

== Career ==
Peng competed in national competitions breaking Chinese weightlifting records and unofficial world records in the snatch (123 kg in the women's -71 kg category & 125 kg in the women's -76 kg category).

Her first international competition is the 2022 Asian Weightlifting Championships, where she participated in the women's 76 kg category. She placed first.

== Major results ==
| Year | Venue | Weight | Snatch (kg) | | | | Clean & Jerk (kg) | | | | Total | Rank |
| Year | Venue | Weight | 1 | 2 | 3 | Rank | 1 | 2 | 3 | Rank | Total | Rank |
Asian Championships
| 2022 | Manama, Bahrain | 76 kg | 115 | ~~120~~ | ~~120~~ | 1st place, gold medalist(s) | 116 | 124 | 128 | 1st place, gold medalist(s) | 243 | 1st place, gold medalist(s) |
