= 2026 Asian Weightlifting Championships =

- Venue: Mahatma Mandir Convention & Exhibition Centre
- Location: Gandhinagar, India
- Dates: 11–17 May
- Competitors: 172 from 28 nations

The 2026 Asian Weightlifting Championships were held in Gandhinagar, India, from 11 to 17 May 2026.

== Medal table ==
Ranking by Big (Total result) medals

* Host nation (India)

Rank	Nation	Gold	Silver	Bronze	Total
1	China (CHN)	7	4	3	14
2	North Korea (PRK)	7	3	0	10
3	Chinese Taipei (TPE)	1	2	1	4
4	Bahrain (BHR)	1	1	0	2
5	Vietnam (VIE)	0	1	2	3
6	Turkmenistan (TKM)	0	1	1	2
7	Iran (IRI)	0	1	0	1
7	Malaysia (MAS)	0	1	0	1
7	Qatar (QAT)	0	1	0	1
7	Uzbekistan (UZB)	0	1	0	1
11	India (IND)*	0	0	4	4
11	South Korea (KOR)	0	0	4	4
13	Japan (JPN)	0	0	1	1
Totals (13 entries)		16	16	16	48

Ranking by all medals: Big (Total result) and Small (Snatch and Clean & Jerk)

* Host nation (India)

Rank	Nation	Gold	Silver	Bronze	Total
1	China (CHN)	21	12	8	41
2	North Korea (PRK)	18	11	1	30
3	Chinese Taipei (TPE)	3	7	3	13
4	Bahrain (BHR)	3	3	0	6
5	Iran (IRI)	2	1	1	4
6	Uzbekistan (UZB)	1	4	1	6
7	Malaysia (MAS)	0	3	0	3
8	Vietnam (VIE)	0	2	6	8
9	Qatar (QAT)	0	2	1	3
10	South Korea (KOR)	0	1	10	11
11	India (IND)*	0	1	9	10
12	Turkmenistan (TKM)	0	1	4	5
13	Japan (JPN)	0	0	2	2
14	Kazakhstan (KAZ)	0	0	1	1
14	Philippines (PHI)	0	0	1	1
Totals (15 entries)		48	48	48	144

== Medal overview ==
=== Men ===
Event		Gold		Silver		Bronze	
– 60 kg	Snatch	Pang Un-chol (PRK)	130 kg	Aniq Kasdan (MAS)	122 kg	Lại Gia Thành (VIE)	121 kg
– 60 kg	Clean & Jerk	Pang Un-chol (PRK)	174 kg WR	Aniq Kasdan (MAS)	155 kg	Lại Gia Thành (VIE)	146 kg
– 60 kg	Total	Pang Un-chol (PRK)	304 kg	Aniq Kasdan (MAS)	277 kg	Lại Gia Thành (VIE)	267 kg
– 65 kg	Snatch	He Yueji (CHN)	146 kg	Ding Hongjie (CHN)	145 kg	Pak Myong-jin (PRK)	144 kg
– 65 kg	Clean & Jerk	He Yueji (CHN)	183 kg WR	Pak Myong-jin (PRK)	177 kg	Ding Hongjie (CHN)	174 kg
– 65 kg	Total	He Yueji (CHN)	329 kg WR	Pak Myong-jin (PRK)	321 kg	Ding Hongjie (CHN)	319 kg
– 71 kg	Snatch	Chen Jian (CHN)	155 kg	Ri Won-ju (PRK)	154 kg	Bunýad Raşidow (TKM)	147 kg
– 71 kg	Clean & Jerk	Ri Won-ju (PRK)	197 kg WR	Chen Jian (CHN)	180 kg	Ajith Narayana (IND)	174 kg
– 71 kg	Total	Ri Won-ju (PRK)	351 kg WR	Chen Jian (CHN)	335 kg	Ajith Narayana (IND)	314 kg
– 79 kg	Snatch	Ri Chong-song (PRK)	161 kg	Ri Ryong-hyon (PRK)	158 kg	Lu Naigang (CHN)	157 kg
– 79 kg	Clean & Jerk	Ri Ryong-hyon (PRK)	206 kg WR	Ri Chong-song (PRK)	197 kg	Abdulaziz Alimjanov (UZB)	191 kg
– 79 kg	Total	Ri Ryong-hyon (PRK)	364 kg	Ri Chong-song (PRK)	358 kg	Lu Naigang (CHN)	345 kg
– 88 kg	Snatch	Sarvarbek Zafarjonov (UZB)	169 kg	Ro Kwang-ryol (PRK)	167 kg	Alexandr Uvarov (KAZ)	165 kg
– 88 kg	Clean & Jerk	Ro Kwang-ryol (PRK)	220 kg WR	Pan Yunhua (CHN)	205 kg	Lee Seong-won (KOR)	205 kg
– 88 kg	Total	Ro Kwang-ryol (PRK)	387 kg	Pan Yunhua (CHN)	369 kg	Lee Seong-won (KOR)	368 kg
– 94 kg	Snatch	Tu Yi (CHN)	175 kg	Mukhammadkodir Toshtemirov (UZB)	166 kg	Rüstem Annaberdiýew (TKM)	158 kg
– 94 kg	Clean & Jerk	Tu Yi (CHN)	211 kg	Mukhammadkodir Toshtemirov (UZB)	207 kg	Kim Yu-shin (KOR)	196 kg
– 94 kg	Total	Tu Yi (CHN)	386 kg	Mukhammadkodir Toshtemirov (UZB)	373 kg	Rüstem Annaberdiýew (TKM)	354 kg
– 110 kg	Snatch	Liu Huanhua (CHN)	190 kg	Chen Po-jen (TPE)	189 kg	Döwranbek Hasanbaýew (TKM)	188 kg
– 110 kg	Clean & Jerk	Alireza Nassiri (IRI)	231 kg	Liu Huanhua (CHN)	230 kg	Dong Bing-cheng (TPE)	215 kg
– 110 kg	Total	Liu Huanhua (CHN)	420 kg	Döwranbek Hasanbaýew (TKM)	392 kg	Dong Bing-cheng (TPE)	381 kg
+ 110 kg	Snatch	Gor Minasyan (BHR)	212 kg	Amir Abdullaev (UZB)	189 kg	Alireza Yousefi (IRI)	184 kg
+ 110 kg	Clean & Jerk	Alireza Yousefi (IRI)	261 kg WR	Gor Minasyan (BHR)	245 kg	Song Yeong-hwan (KOR)	241 kg
+ 110 kg	Total	Gor Minasyan (BHR)	457 kg	Alireza Yousefi (IRI)	445 kg	Song Yeong-hwan (KOR)	416 kg

=== Women ===
Event		Gold		Silver		Bronze	
– 48 kg	Snatch	Fang Wan-ling (TPE)	84 kg	Huang Yi-chen (TPE)	81 kg	Rose Jean Ramos (PHI)	81 kg
– 48 kg	Clean & Jerk	Huang Yi-chen (TPE)	112 kg	Fang Wan-ling (TPE)	108 kg	Komal Kohar (IND)	99 kg
– 48 kg	Total	Huang Yi-chen (TPE)	193 kg	Fang Wan-ling (TPE)	192 kg	Komal Kohar (IND)	177 kg
– 53 kg	Snatch	Zhao Jinlan (CHN)	95 kg	Gyaneshwari Yadav (IND)	88 kg	Nguyễn Hoài Hương (VIE)	87 kg
– 53 kg	Clean & Jerk	Zhao Jinlan (CHN)	121 kg	Nguyễn Hoài Hương (VIE)	108 kg	Cheng Ting-i (TPE)	107 kg
– 53 kg	Total	Zhao Jinlan (CHN)	216 kg	Nguyễn Hoài Hương (VIE)	195 kg	Gyaneshwari Yadav (IND)	194 kg
– 58 kg	Snatch	Kim Il-gyong (PRK)	105 kg AS	Wei Tingna (CHN)	101 kg WJR	Liu Mengjia (CHN)	99 kg
– 58 kg	Clean & Jerk	Kim Il-gyong (PRK)	125 kg	Wei Tingna (CHN)	124 kg	Quàng Thị Tâm (VIE)	122 kg
– 58 kg	Total	Kim Il-gyong (PRK)	230 kg	Wei Tingna (CHN)	225 kg WJR	Quàng Thị Tâm (VIE)	221 kg
– 63 kg	Snatch	Yang Liuyue (CHN)	112 kg WR, WJR	Ri Suk (PRK)	111 kg	Fang Lin (CHN)	105 kg
– 63 kg	Clean & Jerk	Ri Suk (PRK)	143 kg WR	Yang Liuyue (CHN)	139 kg WJR	Fang Lin (CHN)	130 kg
– 63 kg	Total	Ri Suk (PRK)	254 kg WR	Yang Liuyue (CHN)	251 kg WJR	Fang Lin (CHN)	235 kg
– 69 kg	Snatch	Song Kuk-hyang (PRK)	112 kg	Chen Wen-huei (TPE)	104 kg	Harjinder Kaur (IND)	96 kg
– 69 kg	Clean & Jerk	Song Kuk-hyang (PRK)	151 kg WR	Chen Wen-huei (TPE)	135 kg	Yui Miyagoe (JPN)	125 kg
– 69 kg	Total	Song Kuk-hyang (PRK)	263 kg	Chen Wen-huei (TPE)	239 kg	Yui Miyagoe (JPN)	219 kg
– 77 kg	Snatch	Liao Guifang (CHN)	118 kg	Kim Kyong-ryong (PRK)	115 kg	Sanjana (IND)	96 kg
– 77 kg	Clean & Jerk	Liao Guifang (CHN)	147 kg	Kim Kyong-ryong (PRK)	145 kg	Sanjana (IND)	124 kg
– 77 kg	Total	Liao Guifang (CHN)	265 kg	Kim Kyong-ryong (PRK)	260 kg	Sanjana (IND)	220 kg
– 86 kg	Snatch	Peng Cuiting (CHN)	127 kg	Alina Marushchak (BHR)	120 kg	Jang Hyeon-ju (KOR)	109 kg
– 86 kg	Clean & Jerk	Alina Marushchak (BHR)	145 kg	Peng Cuiting (CHN)	143 kg	Jang Hyeon-ju (KOR)	136 kg
– 86 kg	Total	Peng Cuiting (CHN)	270 kg	Alina Marushchak (BHR)	265 kg	Jang Hyeon-ju (KOR)	245 kg
+ 86 kg	Snatch	Li Yan (CHN)	145 kg WR	Park Hye-jeong (KOR)	131 kg	Ouisal Ikhlef (QAT)	130 kg
+ 86 kg	Clean & Jerk	Li Yan (CHN)	178 kg	Ouisal Ikhlef (QAT)	169 kg	Park Hye-jeong (KOR)	167 kg
+ 86 kg	Total	Li Yan (CHN)	323 kg	Ouisal Ikhlef (QAT)	299 kg	Park Hye-jeong (KOR)	298 kg

== Team ranking ==
Men

Rank	Team	Points
1	China	593
2	North Korea	478
3	Uzbekistan	409
4	Chinese Taipei	392
5	India	379
6	Turkmenistan	344

Women

Rank	Team	Points
1	China	578
2	Chinese Taipei	491
3	India	487
4	Sri Lanka	412
5	Bangladesh	395
6	South Korea	352
