= Liao Guifang =

Chinese weightlifter (born 2001)

Personal information
- Nationality: Chinese
- Born: 5 October 2001 (age 25) Changting, Fujian
- Weight: 70.9 kg (156 lb)

Sport
- Country: China
- Sport: Weightlifting
- Event: –71 kg
Medal record
Women's weightlifting
Representing China
World Championships
Gold medal – first place	2023 Riyadh	71 kg
Gold medal – first place	2024 Manama	81 kg
Gold medal – first place	2026 Ningbo	86 kg
Asian Championships
Gold medal – first place	2023 Jinju	71 kg
Gold medal – first place	2025 Jiangshan	76 kg
Gold medal – first place	2026 Gandhinagar	77 kg
Junior World Championships
Gold medal – first place	2019 Suva	64 kg
Junior Asian Championships
Bronze medal – third place	2017 Kathmandu	63 kg
National Games of China
Gold medal – first place	2025 Guandong	76 kg
Silver medal – second place	2021 Shaanxi	76 kg

Liao Guifang (Chinese: 廖桂芳; born 5 October 2001) is a Chinese weightlifter from Fujian and world record holder. She won the gold medal in the women's 71 kg event at the World Weightlifting Championships held in Riyadh, Saudi Arabia.

She competed at the 2022 World Championships, finishing fourth. She won the 2023 Asian Championships, setting two world records in the process. She also won the 2023 World Weightlifting Championships, setting two world records at C&J and total, her total record is still unbeaten.
