= 2026 World Weightlifting Championships – Women's 77 kg =

Women's 77 kg at the 2026 World Weightlifting Championships
- Venue: Ningbo Olympic Sports Center
- Location: Ningbo, China
- Dates: 5 November
- Competitors: 35 from 28 nations
- Winning total: 265 kg

Medalists
| gold medal | Yang Qiuxia | China |
| silver medal | Peng Cuiting | China |
| bronze medal | Sara Ahmed | Egypt |

The women's 77 kilograms competition at the 2026 World Weightlifting Championships was held on 5 November 2026.

== Schedule ==
| Date | Time | Event |
|---|---|---|
| 5 November 2026 | 11:00 | Group D |
| 5 November 2026 | 13:30 | Group C |
| 5 November 2026 | 16:00 | Group B |
| 5 November 2026 | 19:00 | Group A |

== Records ==
Prior to this competition, the existing world records were as follows.

| World record | Snatch | Olivia Reeves (USA) | 123 kg | Førde, Norway | 8 October 2025 |
| World record | Clean & Jerk | Olivia Reeves (USA) | 155 kg | Førde, Norway | 8 October 2025 |
| World record | Total | Olivia Reeves (USA) | 278 kg | Førde, Norway | 8 October 2025 |

== Results ==
| Rank | Athlete | Group | Snatch (kg) | | | | Clean & Jerk (kg) | | | | Total |
| Rank | Athlete | Group | 1 | 2 | 3 | Rank | 1 | 2 | 3 | Rank | Total |
|---|---|---|---|---|---|---|---|---|---|---|---|
| 1st place, gold medalist(s) | Yang Qiuxia (CHN) | A | 117 | ~~120~~ | 120 | 2nd place, silver medalist(s) | 138 | 143 | 145 | 1st place, gold medalist(s) | 265 |
| 2nd place, silver medalist(s) | Peng Cuiting (CHN) | A | 121 | 124 | 126; WR | 1st place, gold medalist(s) | 130 | 134 | 136 | 8 | 262 |
| 3rd place, bronze medalist(s) | Sara Ahmed (EGY) | A | 111 | 114 | ~~116~~ | 4 | ~~143~~ | ~~144~~ | 144 | 2nd place, silver medalist(s) | 258 |
| 4 | María Mena (COL) | A | 113 | ~~117~~ | ~~117~~ | 5 | ~~135~~ | 135 | 141 | 3rd place, bronze medalist(s) | 254 |
| 5 | Varvara Kuzminova (RUS) | A | 110 | 115 | ~~117~~ | 3rd place, bronze medalist(s) | 130 | 135 | 138 | 6 | 253 |
| 6 | Mari Sánchez (COL) | A | ~~109~~ | 109 | 112 | 6 | ~~135~~ | 137 | 140 | 5 | 252 |
| 7 | Mattie Rogers (USA) | A | ~~108~~ | 108 | 111 | 8 | 137 | 140 | ~~143~~ | 4 | 251 |
| 8 | Anastasiia Romanova (RUS) | B | 103 | 107 | 111 | 7 | 127 | 132 | 135 | 9 | 246 |
| 9 | Janette Ylisoini (FIN) | A | 110 | ~~114~~ | ~~116~~ | 9 | 131 | 135 | ~~137~~ | 10 | 245 |
| 10 | Aremi Fuentes (MEX) | B | 104 | ~~107~~ | 107 | 13 | 131 | 134 | ~~136~~ | 11 | 241 |
| 11 | Laura Amaro (BRA) | A | ~~103~~ | 103 | ~~106~~ | 17 | 132 | 136 | ~~139~~ | 7 | 239 |
| 12 | Kim I-seul (KOR) | B | 105 | 108 | ~~110~~ | 11 | ~~130~~ | 130 | ~~133~~ | 15 | 238 |
| 13 | Emmy González (MEX) | B | 104 | 107 | ~~110~~ | 12 | 130 | ~~132~~ | ~~132~~ | 13 | 237 |
| 14 | Nana Khorava (GEO) | B | 103 | 106 | 109 | 10 | 122 | 126 | ~~129~~ | 19 | 235 |
| 15 | Isabella Brown (GBR) | C | 100 | ~~103~~ | 103 | 16 | 124 | 127 | 130 | 12 | 233 |
| 16 | Gülälek Kakamyradowa (TKM) | C | 99 | 103 | 105 | 14 | ~~121~~ | 123 | 127 | 16 | 232 |
| 17 | Darya Naumava (BLR) | B | 101 | ~~104~~ | ~~104~~ | 20 | ~~130~~ | 130 | — | 14 | 231 |
| 18 | Daiana Serrano (DOM) | B | ~~102~~ | 102 | ~~105~~ | 18 | 127 | ~~130~~ | ~~130~~ | 17 | 229 |
| 19 | Ayanat Zhumagali (KAZ) | B | 101 | ~~104~~ | ~~104~~ | 19 | 126 | ~~130~~ | ~~130~~ | 18 | 227 |
| 20 | Nikki Löwik (NED) | C | ~~100~~ | 100 | 103 | 15 | 121 | ~~125~~ | ~~127~~ | 23 | 224 |
| 21 | Celia Gold (ISR) | C | ~~92~~ | 95 | 98 | 23 | 120 | 124 | ~~128~~ | 20 | 222 |
| 22 | Gintarė Bražaitė (LTU) | C | ~~97~~ | ~~97~~ | 97 | 24 | 120 | ~~124~~ | 124 | 21 | 221 |
| 23 | Rose Beaudoin (CAN) | D | ~~98~~ | 98 | ~~102~~ | 21 | 120 | ~~123~~ | ~~123~~ | 24 | 218 |
| 24 | Weronika Zielińska (POL) | C | ~~96~~ | ~~96~~ | 96 | 26 | ~~120~~ | ~~120~~ | 120 | 25 | 216 |
| 25 | Simona Jeřábková (CZE) | D | 92 | 95 | ~~99~~ | 27 | 113 | 117 | ~~119~~ | 28 | 212 |
| 26 | Guðný Björk Stefánsdóttir (ISL) | C | 93 | 96 | ~~99~~ | 25 | 115 | ~~118~~ | ~~120~~ | 29 | 211 |
| 27 | Eliška Nováková (CZE) | D | ~~91~~ | 91 | ~~94~~ | 30 | 111 | 115 | 118 | 26 | 209 |
| 28 | Laura Vest Tolstrup (DEN) | D | 91 | ~~93~~ | ~~93~~ | 29 | 117 | ~~120~~ | ~~121~~ | 27 | 208 |
| 29 | Caroline Gernsøe (DEN) | D | 88 | 91 | 93 | 28 | 110 | 114 | ~~116~~ | 30 | 207 |
| 30 | Ivona Gavran (CRO) | D | 80 | ~~84~~ | ~~84~~ | 32 | ~~100~~ | 101 | ~~105~~ | 31 | 181 |
| 31 | Kaitlin Saunders (IRL) | D | 78 | 81 | ~~84~~ | 31 | 99 | ~~103~~ | ~~103~~ | 32 | 180 |
| 32 | Kia Thomas (ISV) | D | 68 | 71 | 75 | 33 | 86 | ~~90~~ | 93 | 33 | 168 |
| 33 | Maryam Bojubarah (KUW) | D | 40 | ~~45~~ | ~~45~~ | 34 | 50 | 55 | ~~56~~ | 34 | 95 |
| — | Alina Sukiasyan (ARM) | C | 95 | 98 | ~~101~~ | 22 | ~~120~~ | ~~120~~ | ~~120~~ | — | — |
| — | Keilin Coleman-Gooch (IRL) | C | ~~95~~ | ~~96~~ | ~~96~~ | — | 118 | ~~122~~ | 122 | 22 | — |
| — | Anna Amroyan (ARM) | B | Did not start | | | | | | | | |
| — | Nasim Ghasemi (IRI) | C | Did not start | | | | | | | | |
| — | Hanan Al-Ameer (KUW) | D | Did not start | | | | | | | | |
