= 2026 World Weightlifting Championships – Women's 86 kg =

Women's 86 kg at the 2026 World Weightlifting Championships
- Venue: Ningbo Olympic Sports Center
- Location: Ningbo, China
- Dates: 6–7 November
- Competitors: 37 from 31 nations
- Winning total: 291 kg WR

Medalists
gold medal	Liao Guifang	China
silver medal	Alina Marushchak	Bahrain
bronze medal	Yudelina Mejía	Dominican Republic

The women's 86 kilograms competition at the 2026 World Weightlifting Championships was held on 6 and 7 November 2026.

== Schedule ==
Date	Time	Event
6 November 2026	13:30	Group C
7 November 2026	13:30	Group B
7 November 2026	19:00	Group A

== Records ==
Prior to this competition, the existing world records were as follows.

World record	Snatch	World Standard	129 kg	—	1 June 2025
World record	Clean & Jerk	World Standard	162 kg	—	1 June 2025
World record	Total	World Standard	289 kg	—	1 June 2025

== Results ==
Rank	Athlete	Group	Snatch (kg)				Clean & Jerk (kg)				Total
Rank	Athlete	Group	1	2	3	Rank	1	2	3	Rank	Total
1st place, gold medalist(s)	Liao Guifang (CHN)	A	122	125	128	1st place, gold medalist(s)	155	162	163; WR	1st place, gold medalist(s)	291; WR
2nd place, silver medalist(s)	Alina Marushchak (BHR)	A	118	~~123~~	123	2nd place, silver medalist(s)	140	145	149	2nd place, silver medalist(s)	272
3rd place, bronze medalist(s)	Yudelina Mejía (DOM)	A	115	~~119~~	119	4	~~144~~	144	147	3rd place, bronze medalist(s)	266
4	Ella Nicholson (USA)	A	116	~~119~~	120	3rd place, bronze medalist(s)	142	145	~~148~~	6	265
5	Anamjan Rustamowa (TKM)	A	110	115	118	5	~~140~~	146	~~149~~	5	264
6	Kim Su-hyeon (KOR)	A	~~108~~	~~111~~	111	10	140	~~145~~	147	4	258
7	Madias Ngake (GBR)	C	110	~~113~~	113	6	130	135	140	8	253
8	Emma Poghosyan (ARM)	A	106	~~109~~	~~110~~	18	138	143	~~147~~	7	249
9	Rigina Adashbaeva (UZB)	A	106	109	111	9	~~134~~	134	137	11	248
10	Mairyn Hernández (MEX)	B	~~105~~	105	110	12	~~135~~	135	137	10	247
11	Yekta Jamali (GER)	B	104	108	110	13	130	~~135~~	136	13	246
12	Wakana Nagashima (JPN)	A	106	~~109~~	~~109~~	19	134	138	~~140~~	9	244
13	Marie Fegue (FRA)	B	103	107	~~109~~	16	133	136	~~140~~	12	243
14	Iryna Dombrovska (UKR)	A	110	113	~~115~~	8	130	~~135~~	~~135~~	19	243
15	Mariam Murgvliani (GEO)	B	~~105~~	~~105~~	105	22	125	130	134	14	239
16	Motoka Nakajima (JPN)	B	105	~~108~~	~~108~~	21	131	~~136~~	~~136~~	16	236
17	Mariia Gruzdova (RUS)	C	97	101	104	23	125	130	~~136~~	17	234
18	Minni Hormavirta (FIN)	B	100	~~103~~	~~103~~	29	~~131~~	~~132~~	132	15	232
19	Anne Vejsgaard Jensen (DEN)	C	102	106	110	11	115	119	121	24	231
20	Büşra Çan (TUR)	B	~~103~~	103	106	17	125	~~130~~	~~131~~	23	231
21	Litia Nacagilevu (NZL)	C	~~105~~	105	~~110~~	20	121	125	~~129~~	22	230
22	Natia Gadelia (GEO)	B	102	~~104~~	104	24	126	~~132~~	~~132~~	21	230
23	Nigora Suvonova (UZB)	B	100	~~103~~	~~103~~	28	130	~~133~~	~~133~~	18	230
24	Lkhagvajavyn Bolortuyaa (MGL)	C	~~94~~	95	99	31	122	127	~~131~~	20	226
25	Lo Ying-yuan (TPE)	C	95	100	~~103~~	27	~~120~~	~~120~~	121	25	221
26	Veronika Mitykó (HUN)	C	98	101	~~104~~	26	115	119	~~121~~	27	220
27	Clémentine Meukeugni (WRT)	C	98	~~101~~	~~101~~	32	115	~~120~~	120	26	218
28	Nikola Seničová (SVK)	C	94	99	~~102~~	30	118	~~123~~	~~123~~	28	217
29	Ajah Pritchard-Lolo (VAN)	C	~~94~~	94	~~99~~	33	~~113~~	113	~~118~~	29	207
30	Rachel Enock (KEN)	C	87	91	~~93~~	34	105	108	~~111~~	30	199
31	Rita Rodrigues (POR)	C	83	87	~~91~~	35	103	107	~~110~~	31	194
—	Liana Gyurjyan (ARM)	A	102	~~105~~	~~106~~	25	~~135~~	~~135~~	~~135~~	—	—
—	Valeria Rivas (COL)	A	~~110~~	110	~~114~~	14	~~138~~	~~140~~	~~140~~	—	—
—	Ilke Lagrou (BEL)	B	109	~~112~~	113	7	~~129~~	~~131~~	~~132~~	—	—
—	Katelyn Witte (USA)	B	107	~~111~~	~~112~~	15	~~135~~	~~136~~	~~136~~	—	—
—	Jang Hyeon-ju (KOR)	B	~~105~~	—	—	—	—	—	—	—	—
—	Eliška Šmigová (CZE)	C	~~94~~	~~94~~	~~94~~	—	—	—	—	—	—
—	Kelin Jiménez (ECU)	B	Did not start								
