= 2026 World Weightlifting Championships =

Weightlifting competition

2026 IWF World Championships
- Venue: Ningbo Olympic Sports Center
- Location: Ningbo, China
- Dates: 27 October – 8 November 2026
- Competitors: 502 from 95 nations

The 2026 World Weightlifting Championships was a weightlifting competition located in Ningbo, China, organised by the International Weightlifting Federation. The competition took place from 27 October to 8 November 2026.

== Schedule ==
All times are local (UTC+8).

Men's events
Date Event	Tue 27		Wed 28				Thu 29	Fri 30		Sat 31			Sun 1	Mon 2				Tue 3	Wed 4				Thu 5	Fri 6			Sat 7		Sun 8
Date Event	13:30	16:00	11:00	13:30	16:00	19:00		13:30	19:00	13:30	16:00	19:00		11:00	13:30	16:00	19:00		11:00	13:30	16:00	19:00		11:00	16:30	19:00	11:00	16:30	14:00
60 kg	B	A																											
65 kg			D	C	B	A																							
70 kg									A																				
75 kg								D		C	B	A																	
85 kg														D	C	B	A												
95 kg																			D	C	B	A							
110 kg																								C	B	A			
+110 kg																											C	B	A

Women's events
Date Event	Tue 27		Wed 28	Thu 29				Fri 30	Sat 31	Sun 1				Mon 2	Tue 3				Wed 4	Thu 5				Fri 6	Sat 7		Sun 8		
Date Event	11:00	19:00		11:00	13:30	16:00	19:00	16:00		11:00	13:30	16:00	19:00		11:00	13:30	16:00	19:00		11:00	13:30	16:00	19:00	13:30	13:30	19:00	09:00	11:30	16:30
49 kg	B	A																											
53 kg				D	C	B	A																						
57 kg				B				A																					
61 kg										D	C	B	A																
69 kg															D	C	B	A											
77 kg																				D	C	B	A						
86 kg																								C	B	A			
+86 kg																											C	B	A

== Medal table ==
Ranking by Big (Total result) medals

* Host nation (China)

Rank	Nation	Gold	Silver	Bronze	Total
1	North Korea	6	3	3	12
2	China*	6	3	2	11
3	Egypt	1	0	1	2
4	Bulgaria	1	0	0	1
4	Iraq	1	0	0	1
4	Uzbekistan	1	0	0	1
7	Iran	0	2	1	3
8	Chinese Taipei	0	1	1	2
8	Colombia	0	1	1	2
8	South Korea	0	1	1	2
8	United States	0	1	1	2
12	Bahrain	0	1	0	1
12	Indonesia	0	1	0	1
12	Kazakhstan	0	1	0	1
12	Turkey	0	1	0	1
16	Armenia	0	0	1	1
16	Dominican Republic	0	0	1	1
16	Thailand	0	0	1	1
16	Turkmenistan	0	0	1	1
16	Ukraine	0	0	1	1
Totals (20 entries)		16	16	16	48

Ranking by all medals: Big (Total result) and Small (Snatch and Clean & Jerk)

* Host nation (China)

Rank	Nation	Gold	Silver	Bronze	Total
1	North Korea	20	8	6	34
2	China*	17	10	6	33
3	Bulgaria	3	0	0	3
3	Uzbekistan	3	0	0	3
5	Iraq	2	1	0	3
6	Iran	1	3	4	8
7	Colombia	1	2	4	7
8	Egypt	1	2	3	6
9	United States	0	3	3	6
10	South Korea	0	3	2	5
11	Turkey	0	3	1	4
12	Bahrain	0	3	0	3
12	Kazakhstan	0	3	0	3
14	Chinese Taipei	0	2	4	6
15	Indonesia	0	2	0	2
16	Armenia	0	1	3	4
17	Ukraine	0	1	1	2
18	Romania	0	1	0	1
19	Dominican Republic	0	0	2	2
19	Philippines	0	0	2	2
19	Thailand	0	0	2	2
19	Turkmenistan	0	0	2	2
23	Moldova	0	0	1	1
23	Russia	0	0	1	1
23	Venezuela	0	0	1	1
Totals (25 entries)		48	48	48	144

== Medal summary ==
=== Men ===
Event	Gold		Silver		Bronze	
60 kg
Snatch	Yang Yang; China	136 kg	Pang Un-chol; North Korea	130 kg	Pak In-song; North Korea	129 kg
Clean & Jerk	Pak In-song; North Korea	171 kg	Pang Un-chol; North Korea	170 kg	Yang Yang; China	168 kg
Total	Yang Yang; China	304 kg	Pang Un-chol; North Korea	300 kg	Pak In-song; North Korea	300 kg
65 kg
Snatch	He Yueji; China	148 kg	Muhammed Furkan Özbek; Turkey	147 kg	Ding Hongjie; China	146 kg
Clean & Jerk	Pak Myong-jin; North Korea	187 kg WR	Hampton Morris; United States	185 kg	Muhammed Furkan Özbek; Turkey	183 kg
Total	Pak Myong-jin; North Korea	331 kg WR	Muhammed Furkan Özbek; Turkey	330 kg	Hampton Morris; United States	328 kg
70 kg
Snatch	Pak Pyol; North Korea	157 kg WR	He Baozhen; China	151 kg	Ri Won-ju; North Korea	151 kg
Clean & Jerk	Pak Pyol; North Korea	198 kg	Ri Won-ju; North Korea	192 kg	He Baozhen; China	188 kg
Total	Pak Pyol; North Korea	355 kg WR	Ri Won-ju; North Korea	343 kg	He Baozhen; China	339 kg
75 kg
Snatch	Ri Ryong-hyon; North Korea	160 kg	Kaan Kahriman; Turkey	159 kg	Hugo Montes; Colombia	158 kg
Clean & Jerk	Ri Ryong-hyon; North Korea	205 kg	Rahmat Erwin Abdullah; Indonesia	202 kg	Weeraphon Wichuma; Thailand	200 kg
Total	Ri Ryong-hyon; North Korea	365 kg	Rahmat Erwin Abdullah; Indonesia	359 kg	Weeraphon Wichuma; Thailand	355 kg
85 kg
Snatch	Yeison López; Colombia	178 kg WR	Abdelrahman Younes; Egypt	177 kg	Marin Robu; Moldova	176 kg
Clean & Jerk	Ro Kwang-ryol; North Korea	215 kg WR	Lei Jiangqing; China	214 kg	Abdelrahman Younes; Egypt	213 kg
Total	Abdelrahman Younes; Egypt	390 kg WR	Yeison López; Colombia	387 kg	Lei Jiangqing; China	382 kg
95 kg
Snatch	Karlos Nasar; Bulgaria	185 kg WR	Nurgissa Adiletuly; Kazakhstan	182 kg	Ali Alipour; Iran	181 kg
Clean & Jerk	Karlos Nasar; Bulgaria	230 kg WR	Nurgissa Adiletuly; Kazakhstan	217 kg	Ali Alipour; Iran	215 kg
Total	Karlos Nasar; Bulgaria	415 kg WR	Nurgissa Adiletuly; Kazakhstan	399 kg	Ali Alipour; Iran	396 kg
110 kg
Snatch	Akbar Djuraev; Uzbekistan	198 kg WR	Luis Lauret; Romania	194 kg	Chen Po-jen; Chinese Taipei	191 kg
Clean & Jerk	Akbar Djuraev; Uzbekistan	234 kg	Alireza Nassiri; Iran	233 kg	Şahzadbek Matýakubow; Turkmenistan	230 kg
Total	Akbar Djuraev; Uzbekistan	432 kg WR	Alireza Nassiri; Iran	418 kg	Şahzadbek Matýakubow; Turkmenistan	417 kg
+110 kg
Snatch	Ali Ammar; Iraq	211 kg	Varazdat Lalayan; Armenia	210 kg	Ali Davoudi; Iran	206 kg
Clean & Jerk	Alireza Yousefi; Iran	263 kg WR	Ali Ammar; Iraq	255 kg	Varazdat Lalayan; Armenia	247 kg
Total	Ali Ammar; Iraq	466 kg	Alireza Yousefi; Iran	458 kg	Varazdat Lalayan; Armenia	457 kg

=== Women ===
Event	Gold		Silver		Bronze	
49 kg
Snatch	Ri Song-gum; North Korea	92 kg	Zhao Jinhong; China	91 kg	Rose Jean Ramos; Philippines	86 kg
Clean & Jerk	Ri Song-gum; North Korea	119 kg	Zhao Jinhong; China	116 kg	Fang Wan-ling; Chinese Taipei	105 kg
Total	Ri Song-gum; North Korea	211 kg	Zhao Jinhong; China	207 kg	Huang Yi-chen; Chinese Taipei	186 kg
53 kg
Snatch	Zhang Haiqin; China	98 kg	Miranda Ulrey; United States	98 kg	Rosegie Ramos; Philippines	97 kg
Clean & Jerk	Kim So-hyon; North Korea	123 kg	Zhang Haiqin; China	123 kg	Miranda Ulrey; United States	122 kg
Total	Zhang Haiqin; China	221 kg	Miranda Ulrey; United States	220 kg	Kim So-hyon; North Korea	214 kg
57 kg
Snatch	Oh Kwang-ok; North Korea	102 kg	Olha Ivzhenko; Ukraine	96 kg	Chen Guan-ling; Chinese Taipei	90 kg
Clean & Jerk	Oh Kwang-ok; North Korea	125 kg	Chen Guan-ling; Chinese Taipei	125 kg	Aleksandra Grigoryan; Armenia	120 kg
Total	Oh Kwang-ok; North Korea	227 kg	Chen Guan-ling; Chinese Taipei	215 kg	Olha Ivzhenko; Ukraine	214 kg
61 kg
Snatch	Pei Xinyi; China	112 kg	Karen Mosquera; Colombia	111 kg	Yang Liuyue; China	110 kg
Clean & Jerk	Pei Xinyi; China	142 kg WR	Yang Liuyue; China	139 kg	Pak Jin-hae; North Korea	138 kg
Total	Pei Xinyi; China	254 kg WR	Yang Liuyue; China	249 kg	Pak Jin-hae; North Korea	243 kg
69 kg
Snatch	Song Kuk-hyang; North Korea	122 kg WR	Ri Suk; North Korea	112 kg	Julieth Rodríguez; Colombia	109 kg
Clean & Jerk	Song Kuk-hyang; North Korea	153 kg WR	Ri Suk; North Korea	147 kg	Roufida Fathi; Egypt	137 kg
Total	Song Kuk-hyang; North Korea	275 kg WR	Ri Suk; North Korea	259 kg	Julieth Rodríguez; Colombia	245 kg
77 kg
Snatch	Peng Cuiting; China	126 kg WR	Yang Qiuxia; China	120 kg	Varvara Kuzminova; Russia	115 kg
Clean & Jerk	Yang Qiuxia; China	145 kg	Sara Ahmed; Egypt	144 kg	María Mena; Colombia	141 kg
Total	Yang Qiuxia; China	265 kg	Peng Cuiting; China	262 kg	Sara Ahmed; Egypt	258 kg
86 kg
Snatch	Liao Guifang; China	128 kg	Alina Marushchak; Bahrain	123 kg	Ella Nicholson; United States	120 kg
Clean & Jerk	Liao Guifang; China	163 kg WR	Alina Marushchak; Bahrain	149 kg	Yudelina Mejía; Dominican Republic	147 kg
Total	Liao Guifang; China	291 kg WR	Alina Marushchak; Bahrain	272 kg	Yudelina Mejía; Dominican Republic	266 kg
+86 kg
Snatch	Li Yan; China	147 kg WR	Park Hye-jeong; South Korea	125 kg	Naryury Pérez; Venezuela	121 kg
Clean & Jerk	Li Yan; China	170 kg	Park Hye-jeong; South Korea	161 kg	Kim Hyo-eon; South Korea	159 kg
Total	Li Yan; China	317 kg	Park Hye-jeong; South Korea	286 kg	Kim Hyo-eon; South Korea	277 kg

== Team ranking ==
=== Men ===
Rank	Team	Points
1	North Korea	532
2	China	528
3	Iran	447
4	South Korea	330
5	Turkey	306
6	United States	274

=== Women ===
Rank	Team	Points
1	China	633
2	North Korea	467
3	Chinese Taipei	418
4	United States	378
5	Russia	342
6	Colombia	293

== Participating countries ==
A total of 502 competitors from 95 nations participated.

- Afghanistan (1)
- Albania (3)
- Armenia (12)
- Australia (2)
- Austria (3)
- Azerbaijan (2)
- Bahrain (3)
- Bangladesh (2)
- Belarus (8)
- Belgium (3)
- Bosnia and Herzegovina (2)
- Botswana (1)
- Brazil (5)
- Bulgaria (5)
- Canada (10)
- Chile (4)
- China (16)
- Chinese Taipei (16)
- Colombia (11)
- Croatia (3)
- Cuba (1)
- Czech Republic (7)
- Denmark (4)
- Dominican Republic (8)
- Ecuador (5)
- Egypt (6)
- Fiji (5)
- Finland (4)
- France (5)
- Georgia (8)
- Germany (4)
- Great Britain (6)
- Greece (1)
- Hong Kong (2)
- Hungary (3)
- Iceland (6)
- India (4)
- Indonesia (7)
- Iran (9)
- Iraq (1)
- Ireland (8)
- Israel (2)
- Italy (3)
- Jamaica (1)
- Japan (16)
- Jordan (1)
- Kazakhstan (7)
- Kenya (6)
- Kosovo (2)
- Kuwait (10)
- Latvia (4)
- Lithuania (6)
- Luxembourg (2)
- Madagascar (6)
- Malaysia (3)
- Mexico (15)
- Moldova (1)
- Mongolia (4)
- Morocco (3)
- Nauru (4)
- Netherlands (3)
- New Zealand (5)
- Nicaragua (2)
- North Korea (13)
- Northern Mariana Islands (1)
- Norway (2)
- Papua New Guinea (2)
- Peru (3)
- Philippines (5)
- Poland (8)
- Portugal (1)
- Puerto Rico (1)
- Qatar (1)
- Romania (5)
- Russia (16)
- Saudi Arabia (3)
- Serbia (1)
- Singapore (2)
- Slovakia (3)
- South Korea (13)
- Spain (7)
- Sweden (4)
- Thailand (8)
- Tonga (2)
- Turkey (13)
- Turkmenistan (10)
- Ukraine (7)
- United Arab Emirates (6)
- United States (16)
- United States Virgin Islands (1)
- Uzbekistan (8)
- Vanuatu (1)
- Venezuela (9)
- Vietnam (5)
- Weightlifting Refugee Team (3)
