= Førde =

Førde may refer to:

== Places ==
- Førde (town), a town in Sunnfjord municipality in Vestland county, Norway
- Førde Municipality, a former municipality in the old Sogn og Fjordane county, Norway
- Førde Airport, Bringeland, an airport serving the town of Førde in Vestland county, Norway
- Førde Church, a church in Sunnfjord municipality in Vestland county, Norway
- Førde Fjord (or Førdefjorden), a fjord in the Sunnfjord region in Vestland county, Norway
- Førde, Sveio, a village in Sveio municipality in Vestland county, Norway
- Førre (sometimes spelled Førde), a village in Tysvær municipality in Rogaland county, Norway
- Fyrde (sometimes spelled Førde), a village in Volda municipality in Møre og Romsdal county, Norway

== People ==
- Einar Førde, a Norwegian politician and a director-general of the Norwegian Broadcasting Corporation

== Other ==
- Førde Health Trust, a public hospital trust that operates hospitals in Vestland county, Norway

== See also ==
- Forde (disambiguation)
