= Weightlifting at the 2009 National Games of China =

Weightlifting was part of the 2009 National Games of China held in Shandong. Men competed in eight and women in seven weight classes.

The competition program at the National Games mirrors that of the Olympic Games as only medals for the total achieved are awarded, but not for individual lifts in either the snatch or clean and jerk. Likewise an athlete failing to register a snatch result cannot advance to the clean and jerk.

== Medal summary ==
=== Men ===
Event	Gold		Silver		Bronze	
56 kg	Long Qingquan; Hunan	302 kg	Li Lizhi; PLA	293 kg	Wu Jingbiao; PLA	293 kg
62 kg	Yang Fan; Hunan	326 kg	Ding Jianjun; Fujian	317 kg	Qiu Le; Guangxi	315 kg
69 kg	Liao Hui; PLA	358 kg	Tang Deshang; Zhejiang	341 kg	Lin Qingfeng; Fujian	332 kg
77 kg	Su Dajin; PLA	374 kg	Lü Xiaojun; Tianjin	373 kg	Li Hongli; Guangdong	365 kg
85 kg	Lu Yong; Guangxi	376 kg	Song Jiawen; Guangdong	360 kg	Kong Xu; Beijing	356 kg
94 kg	He Shuyong; Shandong	392 kg	Jiang Hairong; Guangdong	391 kg	Yuan Aijun; Jiangsu	386 kg
105 kg	Yang Zhe; Shandong	402 kg	Wang Hailong; Heilongjiang	393 kg	Zhang Lixiong; Hebei	390 kg
105+ kg	Sun Haibo; Jilin	445 kg	Yu Mingqiu; Jilin	427 kg	Liu Guohui; PLA	411 kg

=== Women ===
Event	Gold		Silver		Bronze	
48 kg	Wang Mingjuan; Hunan	220 kg	Yang Lian; Hunan	218 kg	Gao Wei; Liaoning	215 kg
53 kg	Li Ping; Hunan	235 kg	Qiu Hongxia; Guangdong	226 kg	Chen Xiaoting; Fujian	225 kg
58 kg	Li Xueying; Henan	251 kg	Qiu Hongmei; Jiangxi	246 kg	Sun Caiyan; Liaoning	245 kg
63 kg	Guan Xinlei; Jiangsu	265 kg	Ouyang Xiaofang; Liaoning	265 kg	Li Liying; Hunan	257 kg
69 kg	Liu Chunhong; Shandong	267 kg	Chen Ling; Jiangsu	265 kg	Kang Yue; Communication	265 kg
75 kg	Cao Lei; Heilongjiang	275 kg	Xiang Yanmei; Hunan	261 kg	Qu Huijuan; Liaoning	261 kg
75+ kg	Qi Xihui; Hunan	324 kg	Zhou Lulu; PLA	323 kg	Mu Shuangshuang; Jilin	315 kg

== Medal table ==
Rank	Delegation	Gold	Silver	Bronze	Total
1	Hunan	5	2	1	8
2	Shandong	3	0	0	3
3	People's Liberation Army	2	2	2	6
4	Jiangsu	1	1	1	3
4	Jilin	1	1	1	3
6	Heilongjiang	1	1	0	2
7	Guangxi	1	0	1	2
8	Henan	1	0	0	1
9	Guangdong	0	3	1	4
10	Liaoning	0	1	3	4
11	Fujian	0	1	2	3
12	Jiangxi	0	1	0	1
12	Tianjin	0	1	0	1
12	Zhejiang	0	1	0	1
15	Beijing	0	0	1	1
15	Communication	0	0	1	1
15	Hebei	0	0	1	1
Totals (17 entries)		15	15	15	45
