= Rongchang, Chongqing =

Rongchang 荣昌区
- District
- Location of Rongchang in Chongqing
- Country: People's Republic of China
- Municipality: Chongqing

Area
  - Total: 1,079 km^{2} (417 sq mi)

Population (2010)
  - Total: 661,300
  - Density: 612.9/km^{2} (1,587/sq mi)
- Time zone: UTC+8 (China Standard)

Rongchang District (Chinese: 荣昌区; pinyin: Róngchāng Qū) is a district of Chongqing Municipality, China, bordering Sichuan province to the west.

The district, with a population of 800,000, is located in the west of Chongqing.

== Administration ==
Name	Chinese (S)	Hanyu Pinyin	Population (2010)	Area (km^{2})
Changyuan Subdistrict	昌元街道	Chāngyuán Jiēdào	58,042	63
Changzhou Subdistrict	昌州街道	Chāngzhōu Jiēdào	33,584	68.56
Guangshun Subdistrict	广顺街道	Guǎngshùn Jiēdào	24,502	39.8
Shuanghe Subdistrict	双河街道	Shuānghé Jiēdào	25,070	88.5
Anfu Subdistrict	安富街道	Ānfù Jiēdào	19,126	61
Fenggao Subdistrict	峰高街道	Fēnggāo Jiēdào	15,962	62
Zhisheng town	直升镇	Zhíshēng Zhèn	6,485	34
Lukong town	路孔镇	Lùkǒng Zhèn	5,428	25
Qingjiang town	清江镇	Qīngjiāng Zhèn	4,917	21
Renyi town	仁义镇	Rényì Zhèn	19,327	79
Hebao town	河包镇	Hébāo Zhèn	14,077	69
Guchang town	古昌镇	Gǔchāng Zhèn	9,325	31
Wujia town	吴家镇	Wújiā Zhèn	17,329	48
Guansheng town	观胜镇	Guānshèng Zhèn	6,674	42.5
Tonggu town	铜鼓镇	Tónggǔ Zhèn	5,795	35
Qingliu town	清流镇	Qīngliú Zhèn	4,708	29
Panlong town	盘龙镇	Pánlóng Zhèn	25,796	126
Yuanjue town	远觉镇	Yuǎnjué Zhèn	4,922	27
Qingsheng town	清升镇	Qīngshēng Zhèn	6,723	32.14
Ronglong town	荣隆镇	Rónglóng Zhèn	16,474	68
Longji town	龙集镇	Lóngjí Zhèn	5,100	21

== Climate ==
Climate data for Rongchang, elevation 338 m (1,109 ft), (1991–2020 normals, extremes 1981–present)
Month	Jan	Feb	Mar	Apr	May	Jun	Jul	Aug	Sep	Oct	Nov	Dec	Year
Record high °C (°F)	18.7 (65.7)	24.2 (75.6)	33.1 (91.6)	34.8 (94.6)	36.9 (98.4)	36.5 (97.7)	40.8 (105.4)	42.6 (108.7)	41.5 (106.7)	35.0 (95.0)	25.5 (77.9)	19.6 (67.3)	42.6 (108.7)
Mean daily maximum °C (°F)	10.0 (50.0)	13.2 (55.8)	18.1 (64.6)	23.5 (74.3)	26.9 (80.4)	28.9 (84.0)	32.3 (90.1)	32.6 (90.7)	27.5 (81.5)	21.3 (70.3)	16.8 (62.2)	11.2 (52.2)	21.9 (71.3)
Daily mean °C (°F)	7.2 (45.0)	9.6 (49.3)	13.8 (56.8)	18.7 (65.7)	22.1 (71.8)	24.6 (76.3)	27.5 (81.5)	27.4 (81.3)	23.2 (73.8)	18.1 (64.6)	13.6 (56.5)	8.6 (47.5)	17.9 (64.2)
Mean daily minimum °C (°F)	5.2 (41.4)	7.2 (45.0)	10.8 (51.4)	15.2 (59.4)	18.6 (65.5)	21.5 (70.7)	24.0 (75.2)	23.8 (74.8)	20.4 (68.7)	16.0 (60.8)	11.5 (52.7)	6.8 (44.2)	15.1 (59.2)
Record low °C (°F)	−1.8 (28.8)	−1.0 (30.2)	−0.9 (30.4)	6.9 (44.4)	9.0 (48.2)	15.3 (59.5)	17.6 (63.7)	17.8 (64.0)	13.5 (56.3)	6.1 (43.0)	1.4 (34.5)	−2.0 (28.4)	−2.0 (28.4)
Average precipitation mm (inches)	16.8 (0.66)	19.3 (0.76)	41.5 (1.63)	77.1 (3.04)	111.4 (4.39)	184.1 (7.25)	194.9 (7.67)	150.6 (5.93)	118.8 (4.68)	81.1 (3.19)	35.2 (1.39)	19.6 (0.77)	1,050.4 (41.36)
Average precipitation days (≥ 0.1 mm)	10.7	9.5	11.7	13.5	14.9	17.0	13.1	11.7	14.2	17.5	11.4	10.7	155.9
Average snowy days	0.4	0.1	0	0	0	0	0	0	0	0	0	0.2	0.7
Average relative humidity (%)	85	81	78	77	77	83	80	78	83	87	86	86	82
Mean monthly sunshine hours	26.2	42.2	81.0	109.3	111.4	97.4	158.2	164.6	92.8	48.1	43.9	26.5	1,001.6
Percentage possible sunshine	8	13	22	28	26	23	37	41	25	14	14	8	22
Source: China Meteorological Administrationall-time extreme temperatureall-time January highall-time July high

== Notable people ==
- Shu Hongbing, Chinese cytologist and immunologist
