= 2026 World Weightlifting Championships – Women's 53 kg =

Women's 53 kg at the 2026 World Weightlifting Championships
- Venue: Ningbo Olympic Sports Center
- Location: Ningbo, China
- Dates: 29 October
- Competitors: 38 from 33 nations
- Winning total: 221 kg

Medalists
gold medal	Zhang Haiqin	China
silver medal	Miranda Ulrey	United States
bronze medal	Kim So-hyon	North Korea

The women's 53 kilograms competition at the 2026 World Weightlifting Championships was held on 29 October 2026.

== Schedule ==
Date	Time	Event
29 October 2026	11:00	Group D
29 October 2026	13:30	Group C
29 October 2026	16:00	Group B
29 October 2026	19:00	Group A

== Records ==
Prior to this competition, the existing world records were as follows.

World record	Snatch	World Standard	99 kg	—	1 June 2025
World record	Clean & Jerk	World Standard	126 kg	—	1 June 2025
World record	Total	World Standard	223 kg	—	1 June 2025

== Results ==
Rank	Athlete	Group	Snatch (kg)				Clean & Jerk (kg)				Total
Rank	Athlete	Group	1	2	3	Rank	1	2	3	Rank	Total
1st place, gold medalist(s)	Zhang Haiqin (CHN)	A	95	98	~~100~~	1st place, gold medalist(s)	120	123	~~126~~	2nd place, silver medalist(s)	221
2nd place, silver medalist(s)	Miranda Ulrey (USA)	A	95	98	~~100~~	2nd place, silver medalist(s)	~~119~~	120	122	3rd place, bronze medalist(s)	220
3rd place, bronze medalist(s)	Kim So-hyon (PRK)	B	88	~~91~~	91	5	115	121	123	1st place, gold medalist(s)	214
4	Surodchana Khambao (THA)	A	90	93	~~96~~	4	115	119	~~122~~	4	212
5	Rosegie Ramos (PHI)	A	92	95	97	3rd place, bronze medalist(s)	110	114	~~118~~	5	211
6	Nigora Abdullaeva (UZB)	A	85	88	90	7	105	109	111	8	201
7	Mihaela Cambei (ROU)	A	91	~~94~~	~~94~~	6	~~105~~	105	109	14	200
8	Gyaneshwari Yadav (IND)	C	85	~~88~~	88	9	106	110	~~112~~	9	198
9	Dahiana Ortiz (DOM)	B	82	85	87	11	105	~~110~~	111	7	198
10	Lin Cheng-jing (TPE)	A	85	87	~~89~~	12	105	~~110~~	110	13	197
11	Nozomi Abe (JPN)	C	~~83~~	83	86	13	102	107	110	11	196
12	Cansel Özkan (TUR)	A	89	~~92~~	~~94~~	8	101	~~105~~	105	22	194
13	Andrea de la Herrán (MEX)	B	83	87	~~89~~	10	101	106	~~110~~	19	193
14	Luluk Diana Tri Wijayana (INA)	B	83	~~86~~	~~87~~	19	103	107	110	12	193
15	Rira Suzuki (JPN)	C	~~80~~	80	82	20	107	110	~~113~~	10	192
16	Maria Stratoudaki (GRE)	B	82	~~84~~	86	14	~~103~~	105	~~107~~	21	191
17	Natasha Rosa Figueiredo (BRA)	B	85	~~88~~	~~88~~	16	106	~~110~~	~~110~~	18	191
18	Nguyễn Hoài Hương (VIE)	C	82	~~84~~	85	15	100	~~103~~	105	20	190
19	Katherin Echandía (VEN)	B	84	~~87~~	~~88~~	18	106	~~109~~	~~110~~	17	190
20	Ogulşat Amanowa (TKM)	B	~~85~~	85	~~87~~	17	100	104	~~108~~	24	189
21	Yuliya Katsianiova (BLR)	B	~~82~~	82	~~85~~	21	102	105	107	15	189
22	Juliana Klarisa (INA)	C	78	~~80~~	~~81~~	29	103	106	~~110~~	16	184
23	Garance Rigaud (FRA)	B	80	~~83~~	~~83~~	26	100	102	104	25	184
24	Alba Sánchez (ESP)	C	81	~~84~~	~~84~~	22	102	~~105~~	~~105~~	27	183
25	Rebekka Tao Jacobsen (NOR)	C	77	~~79~~	79	28	~~101~~	101	104	23	183
26	Natcha Kaewnoi (THA)	B	80	~~84~~	~~84~~	27	103	~~107~~	~~107~~	26	183
27	Kristina Novitskaia (RUS)	C	76	79	81	23	95	99	101	28	182
28	Małgorzata Myjak (POL)	C	80	~~84~~	~~84~~	24	95	99	~~101~~	29	179
29	Malen Monasterio (ESP)	C	78	~~80~~	80	25	98	~~100~~	~~100~~	30	178
30	Radmila Zagorac (SRB)	D	70	73	75	30	90	~~93~~	~~94~~	33	165
31	Rosina Randafiarison (MAD)	D	65	70	~~75~~	31	85	92	~~96~~	32	162
32	Dika Toua (PNG)	D	65	68	~~70~~	33	85	90	93	31	161
33	Jo-Beth Deireragea (NRU)	D	63	67	70	32	~~85~~	85	87	34	157
34	Janet Oduor (KEN)	D	~~60~~	60	~~63~~	34	~~77~~	~~77~~	77	35	137
35	Amal Al-Shareefi (KUW)	D	52	55	~~58~~	35	~~74~~	74	~~80~~	36	129
36	Zahra Al-Hashmi (UAE)	D	48	50	~~52~~	36	~~60~~	60	~~64~~	37	110
37	Nourah Al-Anezi (KUW)	D	40	~~43~~	43	37	40	45	50	38	93
—	Nina Sterckx (BEL)	A	~~91~~	~~91~~	~~91~~	—	112	~~117~~	~~121~~	6	—
—	Mirabai Chanu (IND)	B	Did not start								
—	Marjia Akter Ekra (BAN)	D	Did not start								
—	Asia González (PUR)	D	Did not start								
