= Ai Yunan =

Chinese weightlifter (born 1991)

Personal information
- Born: 21 June 1991 (age 35)
- Height: 1.85 m (6 ft 1 in)
- Weight: 150 kg (330 lb)
Medal record
Asian Games
| Silver medal – second place | 2014 Incheon | +105 kg |
Junior Asian Championships
| Gold medal – first place | 2010 Tashkent | +105 kg |
| Gold medal – first place | 2011 Pattaya | +105 kg |
National Games of China
| Gold medal – first place | 2013 Liaoning | +105 kg |
| Gold medal – first place | 2017 Tianjin | +105 kg |

Ai Yunan (Chinese: 艾雨南, born 21 June 1991) is a Chinese weightlifter. He won the silver medal at the 2014 Asian Games in the +105 kg category.
