= Jiangshan =

Jiangshan 江山市 Kiangshan
- County-level city
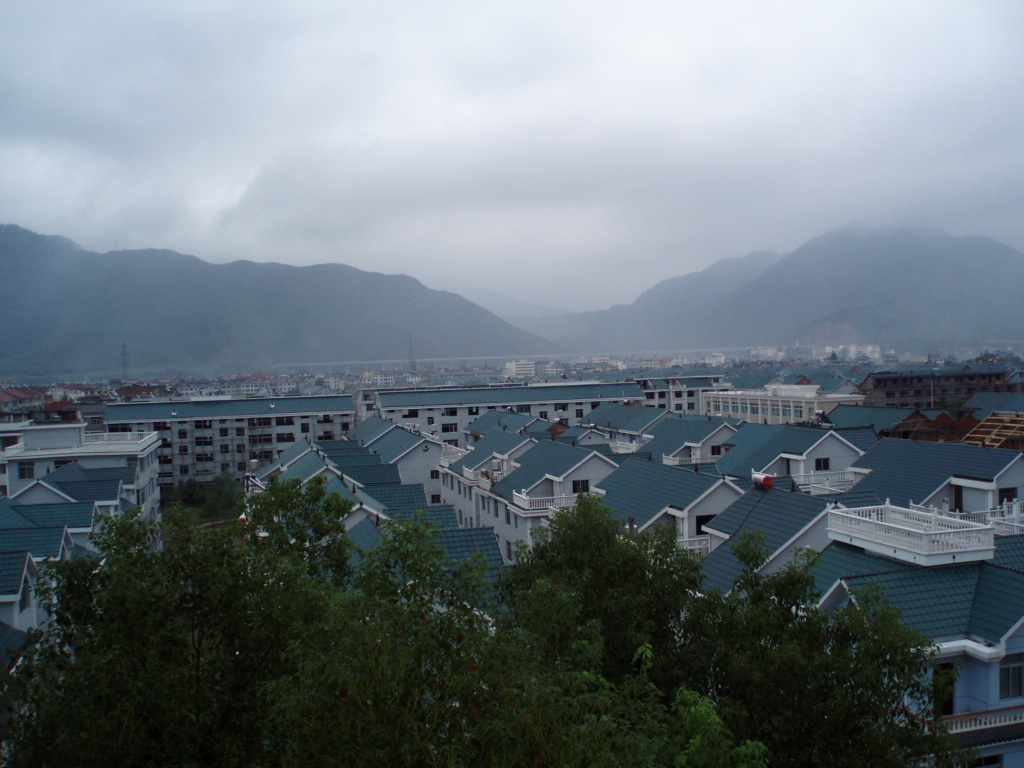
- Xiakou

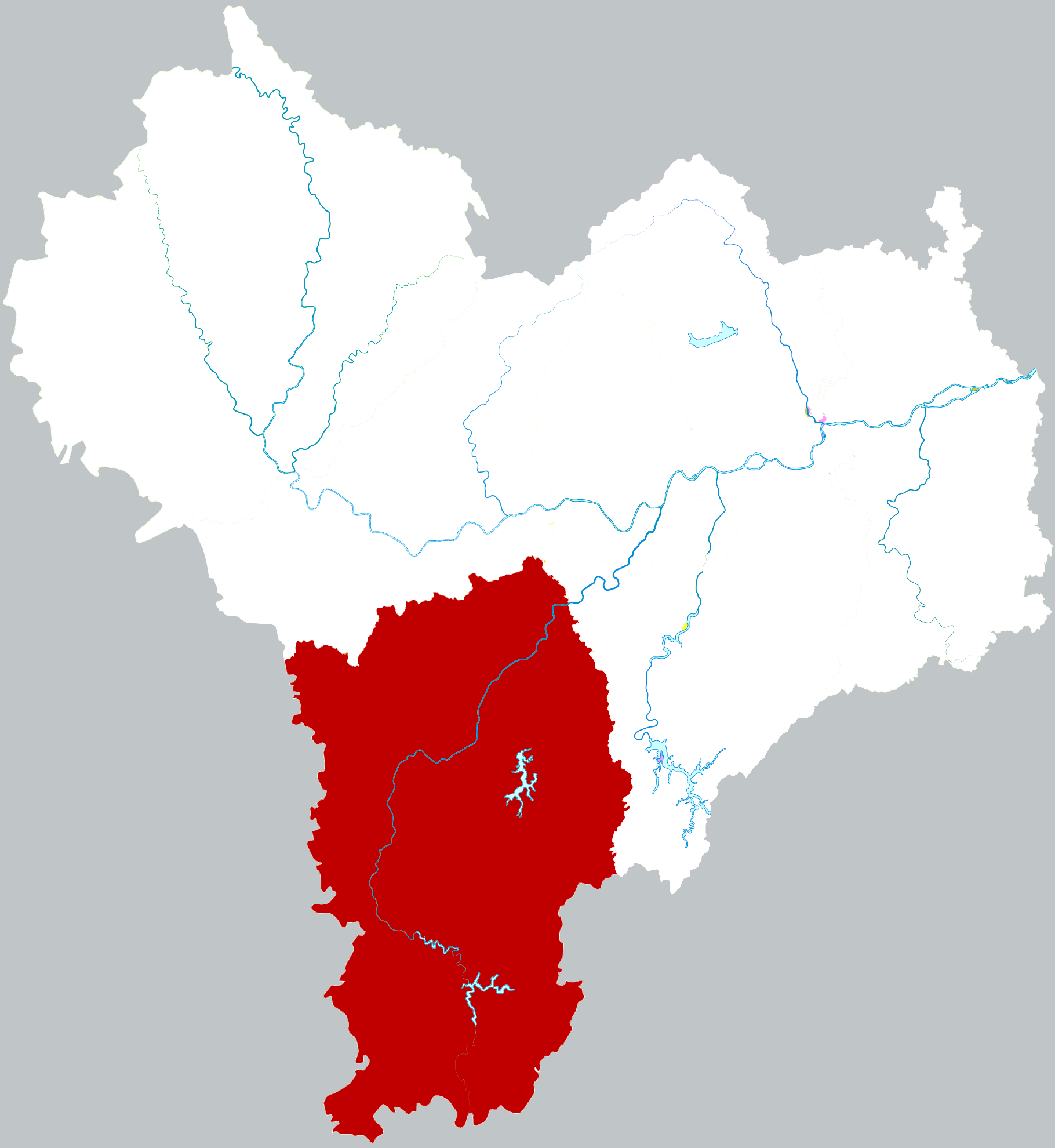
- Location of Jiangshan City within Quzhou

- Location in Zhejiang
- Coordinates: 28°44′10″N 118°37′30″E
- Country: People's Republic of China
- Province: Zhejiang
- Prefecture-level city: Quzhou

Area
  - Total: 2,019.03 km^{2} (779.55 sq mi)

Population (2020)
  - Total: 494,412
- Time zone: UTC+8 (China Standard)

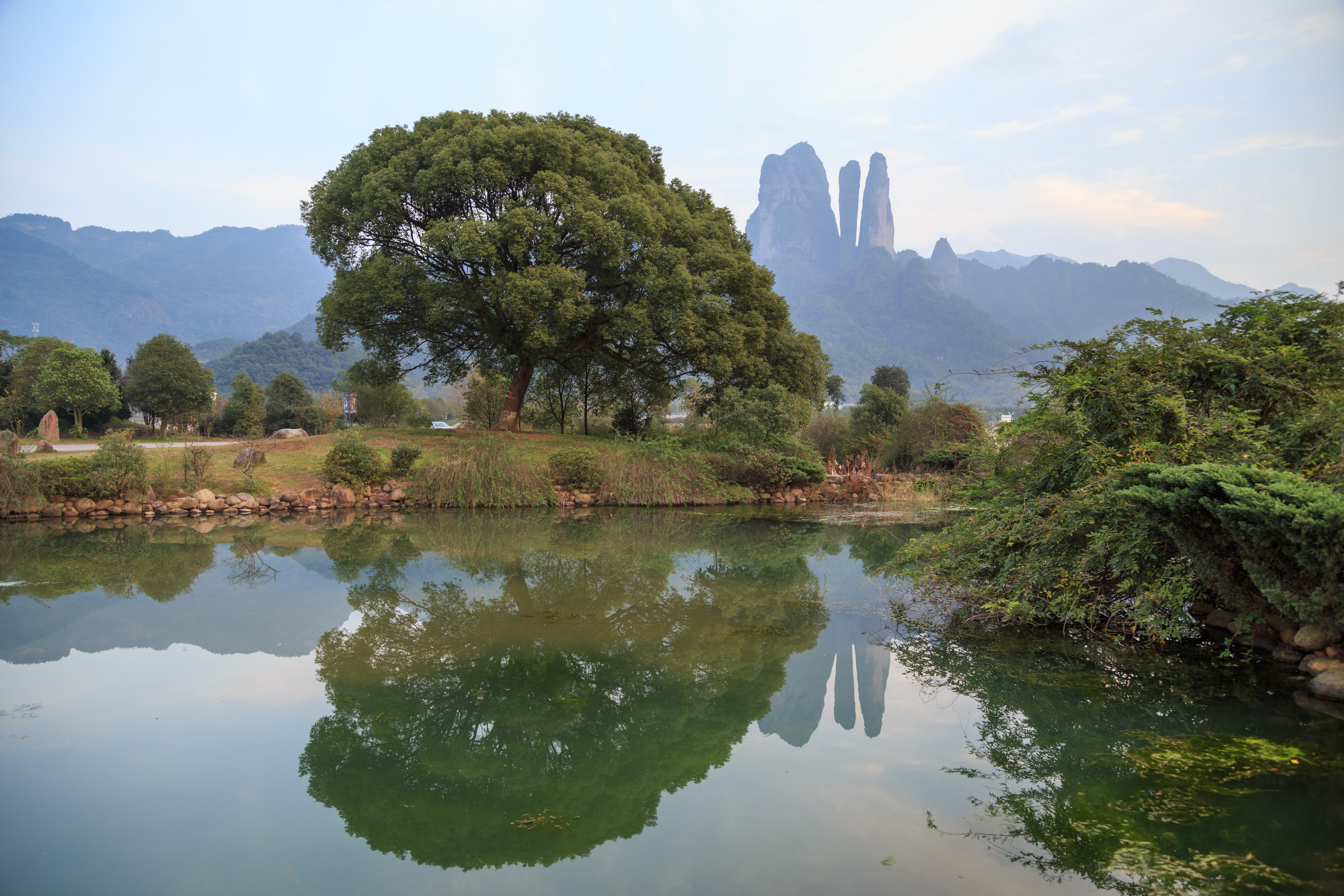
Mount Jianglang of Jiangshan

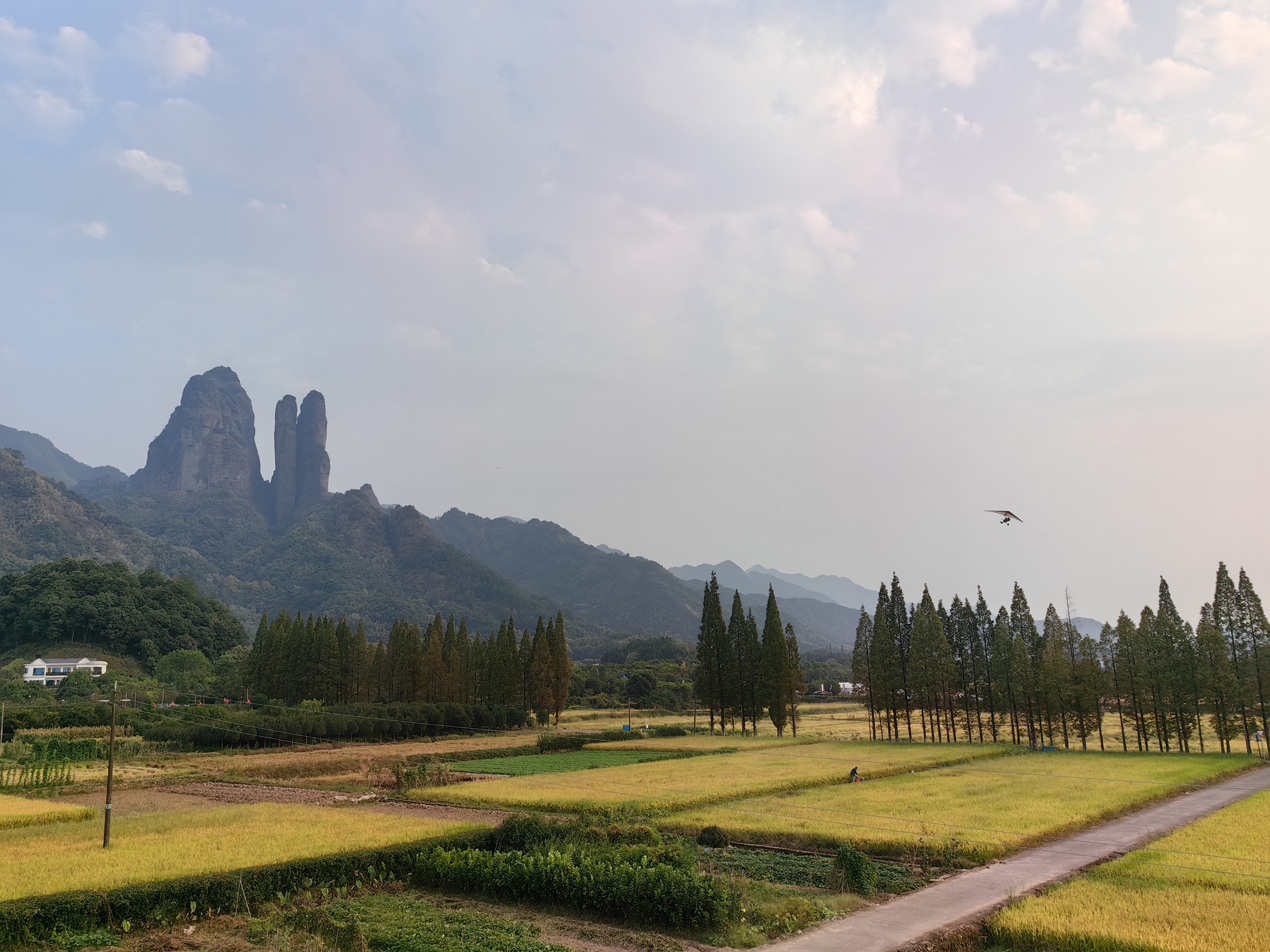
Jianglang mountain (江郎山), Jiangshan

Jiangshan (Chinese: 江山; pinyin: Jiāngshān) is a county-level city located in Quzhou prefecture-level city, in the southwest of Zhejiang Province, China, bordering Jiangxi province to the west. Located about 250 kilometers southwest of Hangzhou, the provincial capital, it is the only county-level city in Quzhou. In 1999, Jiangshan's population stood at 563,196. The city is named aptly: Jiang means river and Shan means mountain; a river runs through the city and scenic Mt. Jianglang sits on its border.

USA Today described Jiangshan as a "fairly prosperous city in one of China's most developed provinces".

The Jiangshanian Age of the Cambrian Period of geological time is named for Jiangshan.

== Administrative divisions ==
It has 3 subdistricts, 11 towns, 5 townships, 13 residential communities, and 292 administrative villages:

- Subdistricts: Hushan Subdistrict, Shuangta Subdistrict, Qinghu Subdistrict
- Town: Town on more than four all towns, villages and towns celebrate, Fenglin Township, the town of Gap, benches town, shimenzhen, Big Town, the altar stone town, new town pond, Nianbadu town.
- Township: Dachen Township, Bowl Kiln Township, Tangyuankou Township, Zhangcun Township, and Baoan Township

== Climate ==
Climate data for Jiangshan, elevation 126 m (413 ft), (1991–2020 normals, extremes 1981–present)
Month	Jan	Feb	Mar	Apr	May	Jun	Jul	Aug	Sep	Oct	Nov	Dec	Year
Record high °C (°F)	24.1 (75.4)	28.2 (82.8)	34.1 (93.4)	35.0 (95.0)	37.0 (98.6)	37.3 (99.1)	41.2 (106.2)	41.1 (106.0)	40.0 (104.0)	36.6 (97.9)	32.2 (90.0)	24.5 (76.1)	41.2 (106.2)
Mean daily maximum °C (°F)	9.8 (49.6)	12.4 (54.3)	16.5 (61.7)	22.7 (72.9)	27.3 (81.1)	29.5 (85.1)	34.0 (93.2)	33.5 (92.3)	29.5 (85.1)	24.3 (75.7)	18.4 (65.1)	12.4 (54.3)	22.5 (72.5)
Daily mean °C (°F)	5.8 (42.4)	8.0 (46.4)	11.8 (53.2)	17.6 (63.7)	22.4 (72.3)	25.2 (77.4)	29.0 (84.2)	28.5 (83.3)	24.8 (76.6)	19.5 (67.1)	13.6 (56.5)	7.8 (46.0)	17.8 (64.1)
Mean daily minimum °C (°F)	3.0 (37.4)	4.8 (40.6)	8.3 (46.9)	13.7 (56.7)	18.6 (65.5)	22.1 (71.8)	25.0 (77.0)	24.8 (76.6)	21.3 (70.3)	15.9 (60.6)	10.1 (50.2)	4.5 (40.1)	14.3 (57.8)
Record low °C (°F)	−6.9 (19.6)	−5.8 (21.6)	−3.1 (26.4)	1.6 (34.9)	9.7 (49.5)	13.6 (56.5)	18.9 (66.0)	18.1 (64.6)	12.7 (54.9)	3.2 (37.8)	−3.3 (26.1)	−7.5 (18.5)	−7.5 (18.5)
Average precipitation mm (inches)	89.3 (3.52)	105.6 (4.16)	195.1 (7.68)	219.5 (8.64)	230.8 (9.09)	362.0 (14.25)	160.4 (6.31)	131.9 (5.19)	72.6 (2.86)	51.7 (2.04)	92.6 (3.65)	71.7 (2.82)	1,783.2 (70.21)
Average precipitation days (≥ 0.1 mm)	13.6	13.4	18.0	16.3	16.4	17.7	11.9	12.6	8.3	7.6	10.6	10.6	157
Average snowy days	2.3	1.8	0.6	0	0	0	0	0	0	0	0.1	1.0	5.8
Average relative humidity (%)	78	78	78	77	77	82	75	76	76	74	78	76	77
Mean monthly sunshine hours	85.4	89.2	101.4	121.6	142.6	124.5	223.0	210.4	175.1	160.0	123.0	112.6	1,668.8
Percentage possible sunshine	26	28	27	31	34	30	53	52	48	45	38	35	37
Source: China Meteorological Administration all-time extreme temperature

== Education ==
Among the handful of schools in Jiangshan is Jiangshan Experimental Primary School, which is part of Zhejiang University's Global TEFL network. The program sends native English-speakers to their network schools to teach English for periods of 2–4 weeks. Aside from these teachers, Jiangshan sees few Westerners because of its relative geographical obscurity. Jiangshan High School is also in Jiangshan.

== Transportation ==
The area is served by Jiangshan railway station.
