= List of Turkmenistan records in Olympic weightlifting =

The following are the national records in Olympic weightlifting in Turkmenistan. Records are maintained in each weight class for the snatch lift, clean and jerk lift, and the total for both lifts by the Weightlifting Federation of Turkmenistan.

== Current records ==
=== Men ===
Event	Record	Athlete	Date	Meet	Place	Ref
60 kg
Snatch						
Clean & Jerk						
Total						
65 kg
Snatch						
Clean & Jerk						
Total						
75 kg
Snatch	155 kg	Bektimur Reýimow	26 September 2026	Asian Games	Nagoya, Japan	
Clean & Jerk	188 kg	Didarbek Jumabaýew	31 October 2026	World Championships	Ningbo, China	
Total	340 kg	Didarbek Jumabaýew	31 October 2026	World Championships	Ningbo, China	

=== Women ===
Event	Record	Athlete	Date	Meet	Place	Ref
49 kg
Snatch						
Clean & Jerk						
Total						
53 kg
Snatch						
Clean & Jerk						
Total						
57 kg
Snatch	89 kg	Şabnam Kerimbaýewa	30 October 2026	World Championships	Ningbo, China	
Clean & Jerk	112 kg	Şabnam Kerimbaýewa	30 October 2026	World Championships	Ningbo, China	
Total	201 kg	Şabnam Kerimbaýewa	30 October 2026	World Championships	Ningbo, China	
63 kg
Snatch						
Clean & Jerk						
Total						
69 kg
Snatch						
Clean & Jerk						
Total						
77 kg
Snatch						
Clean & Jerk						
Total						
86 kg
Snatch	110 kg	Anamjan Rustamowa	7 May 2026	World Junior Championships	Ismailia, Egypt	
Clean & Jerk	147 kg	Anamjan Rustamowa	7 May 2026	World Junior Championships	Ismailia, Egypt	
Total	257 kg	Anamjan Rustamowa	7 May 2026	World Junior Championships	Ismailia, Egypt	
+86 kg
Snatch						
Clean & Jerk						
Total						

== Historical records ==
=== Men (2018–2025) ===
Event	Record	Athlete	Date	Meet	Place	Ref
55 kg
Snatch						
Clean & Jerk						
Total						
61 kg
Snatch	133 kg	Seýitjan Mirzaýew	18 April 2021	Asian Championships	Tashkent, Uzbekistan	
Clean & Jerk	150 kg	Seýitjan Mirzaýew	18 April 2021	Asian Championships	Tashkent, Uzbekistan	
Total	283 kg	Seýitjan Mirzaýew	18 April 2021	Asian Championships	Tashkent, Uzbekistan	
67 kg
Snatch	141 kg	Bunýad Raşidow	7 December 2023	IWF Grand Prix	Doha, Qatar	
Clean & Jerk	162 kg	Bunýad Raşidow	7 May 2023	Asian Championships	Jinju, South Korea	
Total	302 kg	Bunýad Raşidow	7 May 2023	Asian Championships	Jinju, South Korea	
73 kg
Snatch	155 kg	Bunyad Rashidov	4 April 2024	World Cup	Phuket, Thailand	
Clean & Jerk	189 kg	Maksad Meredov	20 April 2021	Asian Championships	Tashkent, Uzbekistan	
Total	336 kg	Maksad Meredov	20 April 2021	Asian Championships	Tashkent, Uzbekistan	
81 kg
Snatch	164 kg	Rejepbaý Rejepow	31 July 2021	Olympic Games	Tokyo, Japan	
Clean & Jerk	193 kg	Gaýgysyz Töräýew	11 September 2023	World Championships	Riyadh, Saudi Arabia	
Total	351 kg	Şatlyk Şöhradow	12 December 2021	World Championships	Tashkent, Uzbekistan	
89 kg
Snatch	162 kg	Şhatlyk Şhohradov	6 April 2024	World Cup	Phuket, Thailand	
Clean & Jerk	195 kg	Rustam Annaberdiýew	13 December 2021	World Championships	Tashkent, Uzbekistan	
Total	357 kg	Şhatlyk Şhohradov	6 April 2024	World Cup	Phuket, Thailand	
96 kg
Snatch	165 kg	Dawranbek Hasanbaýew	14 August 2022	Islamic Solidarity Games	Konya, Turkey	
Clean & Jerk	195 kg	Şatlyk Şöhradow	5 October 2023	Asian Games	Hangzhou, China	
Total	357 kg	Şahzad Matýakubow	11 May 2023	Asian Championships	Jinju, South Korea	
102 kg
Snatch	187 kg	Döwranbek Hasanbaýew	8 April 2024	World Cup	Phuket, Thailand	
Clean & Jerk	219 kg	Şahzadbek Matýakubow	24 December 2024	Asian Junior Championships	Doha, Qatar	
Total	396 kg	Şahzadbek Matýakubow	24 December 2024	Asian Junior Championships	Doha, Qatar	
109 kg
Snatch	175 kg	Ovez Ovezov	24 April 2021	Asian Championships	Tashkent, Uzbekistan	
Clean & Jerk	207 kg	Ovez Ovezov	27 April 2019	Asian Championships	Ningbo, China	
Total	380 kg	Ovez Ovezov	24 April 2021	Asian Championships	Tashkent, Uzbekistan	
+109 kg
Snatch	187 kg	Hojamuhammet Toychyyev	28 April 2019	Asian Championships	Ningbo, China	
Clean & Jerk	234 kg	Hojamuhammet Toychyyev	28 April 2019	Asian Championships	Ningbo, China	
Total	421 kg	Hojamuhammet Toychyyev	28 April 2019	Asian Championships	Ningbo, China	

=== Women (2018–2025) ===
Event	Record	Athlete	Date	Meet	Place	Ref
45 kg
Snatch	75 kg	Ýulduz Jumabaýewa	2 November 2018	World Championships	Ashgabat, Turkmenistan	
Clean & Jerk	104 kg	Ýulduz Jumabaýewa	2 November 2018	World Championships	Ashgabat, Turkmenistan	
Total	179 kg	Ýulduz Jumabaýewa	2 November 2018	World Championships	Ashgabat, Turkmenistan	
49 kg
Snatch	77 kg	Ýulduz Jumabaýewa	21 April 2019	Asian Championships	Ningbo, China	
Clean & Jerk	101 kg	Ýulduz Jumabaýewa	21 April 2019	Asian Championships	Ningbo, China	
Total	178 kg	Ýulduz Jumabaýewa	21 April 2019	Asian Championships	Ningbo, China	
55 kg
Snatch	90 kg	Kristina Şermetowa	26 July 2021	Olympic Games	Tokyo, Japan	
Clean & Jerk	115 kg	Kristina Şermetowa	26 July 2021	Olympic Games	Tokyo, Japan	
Total	205 kg	Kristina Şermetowa	26 July 2021	Olympic Games	Tokyo, Japan	
59 kg
Snatch	96 kg	Polina Guryeva	27 July 2021	Olympic Games	Tokyo, Japan	
Clean & Jerk	121 kg	Polina Guryeva	27 July 2021	Olympic Games	Tokyo, Japan	
Total	217 kg	Polina Guryeva	27 July 2021	Olympic Games	Tokyo, Japan	
64 kg
Snatch	93 kg	Polina Guryeva	24 April 2019	Asian Championships	Ningbo, China	
Clean & Jerk	118 kg	Polina Guryeva	24 April 2019	Asian Championships	Ningbo, China	
Total	211 kg	Polina Guryeva	24 April 2019	Asian Championships	Ningbo, China	
71 kg
Snatch	107 kg	Gülnabat Kadyrowa	14 August 2022	Islamic Solidarity Games	Konya, Turkey	
Clean & Jerk	124 kg	Gülnabat Kadyrowa	13 December 2021	World Championships	Tashkent, Uzbekistan	
Total	225 kg	Gülnabat Kadyrowa	13 December 2021	World Championships	Tashkent, Uzbekistan	
76 kg
Snatch	101 kg	Gülnabat Kadyrowa	26 April 2019	Asian Championships	Ningbo, China	
Clean & Jerk	117 kg	Gülnabat Kadyrowa	12 December 2019	World Cup	Tianjin, China	
Total	218 kg	Gülnabat Kadyrowa	12 December 2019	World Cup	Tianjin, China	
81 kg
Snatch	110 kg	Anamjan Rustamowa	9 April 2024	World Cup	Phuket, Thailand	
Clean & Jerk	130 kg	Anamjan Rustamowa	9 April 2024	World Cup	Phuket, Thailand	
Total	240 kg	Anamjan Rustamowa	9 April 2024	World Cup	Phuket, Thailand	
87 kg
Snatch	108 kg	Anamjan Rustamowa	5 May 2025	World Junior Championships	Lima, Peru	
Clean & Jerk	141 kg	Anamjan Rustamowa	5 May 2025	World Junior Championships	Lima, Peru	
Total	249 kg	Anamjan Rustamowa	5 May 2025	World Junior Championships	Lima, Peru	
+87 kg
Snatch	85 kg	Sangiza Bahtyýarowa	15 August 2022	Islamic Solidarity Games	Konya, Turkey	
Clean & Jerk	110 kg	Sangiza Bahtyýarowa	15 August 2022	Islamic Solidarity Games	Konya, Turkey	
Total	195 kg	Sangiza Bahtyýarowa	15 August 2022	Islamic Solidarity Games	Konya, Turkey	

== Historical records ==
=== Men (1998–2018) ===
Event	Record	Athlete	Date	Meet	Place	Ref
56 kg
Snatch	110 kg	Osmanguly Handurdyyev	18 September 2017	Asian Indoor and Martial Arts Games	Ashgabat, Turkmenistan	
Clean & Jerk	130 kg	Osmanguly Handurdyyev	18 September 2017	Asian Indoor and Martial Arts Games	Ashgabat, Turkmenistan	
Total	240 kg	Osmanguly Handurdyyev	18 September 2017	Asian Indoor and Martial Arts Games	Ashgabat, Turkmenistan	
62 kg
Snatch	136 kg	Ümürbek Bazarbaýew	28 April 2008	Asian Championships	Kanazawa, Japan	
Clean & Jerk	167 kg	Ümürbek Bazarbaýew	30 July 2012	Olympic Games	London, Great Britain	
Total	302 kg	Ümürbek Bazarbaýew	30 July 2012	Olympic Games	London, Great Britain	
69 kg
Snatch						
Clean & Jerk	175 kg	Tolkunbek Hudaýbergenow	8 November 2011	World Championships	Paris, France	
Total						
77 kg
Snatch	162 kg	Rejepbaý Rejepow	21 September 2017	Asian Indoor and Martial Arts Games	Ashgabat, Turkmenistan	
Clean & Jerk	194 kg	Rejepbaý Rejepow	2 December 2017	World Championships	Anaheim, United States	
Total	353 kg	Rejepbaý Rejepow	21 September 2017	Asian Indoor and Martial Arts Games	Ashgabat, Turkmenistan	
85 kg
Snatch	165 kg	Daýanç Asyrow	22 September 2017	Asian Indoor and Martial Arts Games	Ashgabat, Turkmenistan	
Clean & Jerk	191 kg	Daýanç Asyrow	22 September 2017	Asian Indoor and Martial Arts Games	Ashgabat, Turkmenistan	
Total	356 kg	Daýanç Asyrow	22 September 2017	Asian Indoor and Martial Arts Games	Ashgabat, Turkmenistan	
94 kg
Snatch						
Clean & Jerk						
Total						
105 kg
Snatch						
Clean & Jerk						
Total						
+105 kg
Snatch	197 kg	Hojamuhammet Toýçyýew	29 April 2017	Asian Championships	Ashgabat, Turkmenistan	
Clean & Jerk	239 kg	Hojamuhammet Toýçyýew	25 September 2017	Asian Indoor and Martial Arts Games	Ashgabat, Turkmenistan	
Total	431 kg	Hojamuhammet Toýçyýew	25 September 2017	Asian Indoor and Martial Arts Games	Ashgabat, Turkmenistan	

=== Women (1998–2018) ===
Event	Record	Athlete	Date	Meet	Place	Ref
48 kg
Snatch	82 kg	Ýulduz Jumabaýewa	18 September 2017	Asian Indoor and Martial Arts Games	Ashgabat, Turkmenistan	
Clean and jerk	107 kg	Ýulduz Jumabaýewa	18 September 2017	Asian Indoor and Martial Arts Games	Ashgabat, Turkmenistan	
Total	189 kg	Ýulduz Jumabaýewa	18 September 2017	Asian Indoor and Martial Arts Games	Ashgabat, Turkmenistan	
53 kg
Snatch	91 kg	Kristina Şermetowa	30 November 2017	World Championships	Anaheim, United States	
Clean and jerk	113 kg	Kristina Şermetowa	30 November 2017	World Championships	Anaheim, United States	
Total	204 kg	Kristina Şermetowa	30 November 2017	World Championships	Anaheim, United States	
58 kg
Snatch						
Clean and jerk						
Total						
63 kg
Snatch	90 kg	Polina Guryeva	21 September 2017	Asian Indoor and Martial Arts Games	Ashgabat, Turkmenistan	
Clean and jerk	112 kg	Polina Guryeva	21 September 2017	Asian Indoor and Martial Arts Games	Ashgabat, Turkmenistan	
Total	202 kg	Polina Guryeva	21 September 2017	Asian Indoor and Martial Arts Games	Ashgabat, Turkmenistan	
69 kg
Snatch						
Clean and jerk						
Total						
75 kg
Snatch						
Clean and jerk						
Total						
90 kg
Snatch	97 kg	Aýsoltan Tpýcyýeva	24 September 2017	Asian Indoor and Martial Arts Games	Ashgabat, Turkmenistan	
Clean & Jerk	118 kg	Aýsoltan Tpýcyýeva	24 September 2017	Asian Indoor and Martial Arts Games	Ashgabat, Turkmenistan	
Total	215 kg	Aýsoltan Tpýcyýeva	24 September 2017	Asian Indoor and Martial Arts Games	Ashgabat, Turkmenistan	
+90 kg
Snatch						
Clean and jerk						
Total						
