= Huang Ting =

Huang Ting may refer to:

- Huang Ting (weightlifter)
- Huang Ting (gymnast)
- Huang Ding, Chinese landscape painter and poet, Wade–Giles name Huang Ting
- Theodore Wong, Chinese translator and scholar, Wade–Giles name Huang Ting
