= Teymouri =

Teymouri or Teimouri (Persian: تيموري) is a surname. Notable people with the surname include:

- Homayoun Teymouri (born 1994), Iranian weightlifter
- Meysam Teymouri (born 1992), Iranian footballer
- Siavash Teimouri (born 1937), Iranian architect, artist and scholar

== See also ==
- Timuri, subtribe of the Aimaq people
