= 2017 Junior World Weightlifting Championships =

Sports competition

- Venue: Ota City General Gymnasium
- Location: Tokyo, Japan
- Dates: 15-23 June

The 2017 Junior World Weightlifting Championships were held in Ota City General Gymnasium, Tokyo, Japan from 15 to 23 June 2017.

== Medal table ==
Ranking by Big (Total result) medals

* Host nation (Japan)

Rank	Nation	Gold	Silver	Bronze	Total
1	China	7	2	0	9
2	Thailand	1	2	1	4
3	Colombia	1	1	0	2
3	Uzbekistan	1	1	0	2
5	Armenia	1	0	2	3
6	Ecuador	1	0	1	2
6	Iran	1	0	1	2
8	Latvia	1	0	0	1
8	Qatar	1	0	0	1
8	United States	1	0	0	1
11	Ukraine	0	2	2	4
12	Georgia	0	2	1	3
13	Belarus	0	1	1	2
13	Japan*	0	1	1	2
15	Fiji	0	1	0	1
15	Great Britain	0	1	0	1
15	Venezuela	0	1	0	1
15	Vietnam	0	1	0	1
19	Brazil	0	0	1	1
19	Romania	0	0	1	1
19	Russia	0	0	1	1
19	Serbia	0	0	1	1
19	South Korea	0	0	1	1
19	Turkey	0	0	1	1
Totals (24 entries)		16	16	16	48

Ranking by all medals: Big (Total result) and Small (Snatch and Clean & Jerk)

* Host nation (Japan)

Rank	Nation	Gold	Silver	Bronze	Total
1	China	21	5	3	29
2	Thailand	4	4	4	12
3	Colombia	3	2	3	8
4	Armenia	3	2	2	7
5	Uzbekistan	3	2	0	5
6	Ecuador	3	1	3	7
7	Georgia	2	2	3	7
8	Iran	2	2	2	6
9	Qatar	2	1	0	3
10	United States	2	0	0	2
11	Japan*	1	3	3	7
12	Latvia	1	2	1	4
13	Vietnam	1	2	0	3
14	Ukraine	0	5	4	9
15	Belarus	0	3	2	5
16	Russia	0	2	3	5
17	Fiji	0	2	1	3
17	Venezuela	0	2	1	3
19	Great Britain	0	1	2	3
19	Turkey	0	1	2	3
21	Brazil	0	1	1	2
21	Serbia	0	1	1	2
23	Italy	0	1	0	1
23	Tunisia	0	1	0	1
25	Romania	0	0	2	2
25	South Korea	0	0	2	2
27	Algeria	0	0	1	1
27	Germany	0	0	1	1
27	Mexico	0	0	1	1
Totals (29 entries)		48	48	48	144

== Medal overview ==
=== Men ===
Event		Gold		Silver		Bronze	
– 56 kg	Snatch	Wang Hao (CHN)	120 kg	Lại Gia Thành (VIE)	109 kg	İsa Güngör (TUR)	109 kg
– 56 kg	Clean & Jerk	Gia Thanh Lai (VIE)	140 kg	Hiroyuki Mashiko (JPN)	139 kg	Wang Hao (CHN)	138 kg
– 56 kg	Total	Wang Hao (CHN)	258 kg	Lại Gia Thành (VIE)	249 kg	Hiroyuki Mashiko (JPN)	244 kg
– 62 kg	Snatch	Zhixiang Lin (CHN)	130 kg	Cumali Kıvanç (TUR)	127 kg	Chengzuo Wei (CHN)	126 kg
– 62 kg	Clean & Jerk	Zhixiang Lin (CHN)	160 kg	Luis Fernando Barrera (COL)	155 kg	Jon Luke Mau (GER)	154 kg
– 62 kg	Total	Zhixiang Lin (CHN)	290 kg	Luis Fernando Barrera (COL)	281 kg	Cumali Kıvanç (TUR)	273 kg
– 69 kg	Snatch	Masanori Miyamoto (JPN)	147 kg	Mirko Zanni (ITA)	140 kg	José David Lozano (COL)	139 kg
– 69 kg	Clean & Jerk	Clarence Cummings Jr. (USA)	183 kg	Masanori Miyamoto (JPN)	173 kg	Paul Dumitrascu (ROU)	171 kg
– 69 kg	Total	Clarence Cummings Jr. (USA)	321 kg	Masanori Miyamoto (JPN)	320 kg	Bak Joo-hyo (KOR)	305 kg
– 77 kg	Snatch	Yeison López (COL)	161 kg	Xiaoyu Shu (CHN)	155 kg	Ritvars Suharevs (LAT)	154 kg
– 77 kg	Clean & Jerk	Yeison López (COL)	195 kg	Shakhzod Khudayberganov (UZB)	186 kg	Kim Sung-min (KOR)	185 kg
– 77 kg	Total	Yeison López (COL)	356 kg	Shakhzod Khudayberganov (UZB)	338 kg	Viacheslav Iarkin (RUS)	335 kg
– 85 kg	Snatch	Revaz Davitadze (GEO)	162 kg	Faris Ibrahim (QAT)	160 kg	Keydomar Vallenilla (VEN)	156 kg
– 85 kg	Clean & Jerk	Faris Ibrahim (QAT)	193 kg	Keydomar Vallenilla (VEN)	192 kg	Jhonatan Rivas (COL)	191 kg
– 85 kg	Total	Faris Ibrahim (QAT)	353 kg	Keydomar Vallenilla (VEN)	348 kg	Revaz Davitadze (GEO)	347 kg
– 94 kg	Snatch	Farkhodbek Sobirov (UZB)	180 kg	Yauheni Tsikhantsou (BLR)	171 kg	Kyryl Pyrohov (UKR)	169 kg
– 94 kg	Clean & Jerk	Farkhodbek Sobirov (UZB)	210 kg	Yauheni Tsikhantsou (BLR)	207 kg	Rahman Ourameh (IRI)	205 kg
– 94 kg	Total	Farkhodbek Sobirov (UZB)	390 kg	Yauheni Tsikhantsou (BLR)	378 kg	Rahman Ourameh (IRI)	364 kg
– 105 kg	Snatch	Dato Khetsuriani (GEO)	173 kg	Reza Beiralvand (IRI)	163 kg	Takayuki Iwasaki (JPN)	163 kg
– 105 kg	Clean & Jerk	Reza Beiralvand (IRI)	206 kg	Samvel Gasparyan (ARM)	205 kg	Aymen Touairi (ALG)	201 kg
– 105 kg	Total	Reza Beiralvand (IRI)	369 kg	Dato Khetsuriani (GEO)	368 kg	Samvel Gasparyan (ARM)	365 kg
+ 105 kg	Snatch	Simon Martirosyan (ARM)	191 kg	Ali Davoudi (IRI)	187 kg	Giorgi Chkheidze (GEO)	184 kg
+ 105 kg	Clean & Jerk	Simon Martirosyan (ARM)	235 kg	Tamas Kajdoci (SRB)	223 kg	Giorgi Chkheidze (GEO)	222 kg
+ 105 kg	Total	Simon Martirosyan (ARM)	426 kg	Giorgi Chkheidze (GEO)	406 kg	Tamas Kajdoci (SRB)	403 kg

=== Women ===
Event		Gold		Silver		Bronze	
– 48 kg	Snatch	Thunya Sukcharoen (THA)	82 kg	Luana Madeira (BRA)	79 kg	Chiraphan Nanthawong (THA)	78 kg
– 48 kg	Clean & Jerk	Thunya Sukcharoen (THA)	97 kg	Chiraphan Nanthawong (THA)	96 kg	Ibuki Takahashi (JPN)	96 kg
– 48 kg	Total	Thunya Sukcharoen (THA)	179 kg	Chiraphan Nanthawong (THA)	174 kg	Luana Oliveira Madeira (BRA)	169 kg
– 53 kg	Snatch	Zhu Qiaoling (CHN)	88 kg	Kristina Novitskaia (RUS)	85 kg	Mariia Hanhur (UKR)	84 kg
– 53 kg	Clean & Jerk	Zhu Qiaoling (CHN)	109 kg	Nouha Landoulsi (TUN)	105 kg	Ludmila Pankova (BLR)	105 kg
– 53 kg	Total	Zhu Qiaoling (CHN)	197 kg	Mariia Hanhur (UKR)	188 kg	Ludmila Pankova (BLR)	186 kg
– 58 kg	Snatch	Yang Chunyuan (CHN)	100 kg	Rebeka Koha (LAT)	99 kg	Rattanaphon Pakkaratha (THA)	92 kg
– 58 kg	Clean & Jerk	Rattanaphon Pakkaratha (THA)	121 kg	Rebeka Koha (LAT)	120 kg	Yang Chunyuan (CHN)	118 kg
– 58 kg	Total	Rebeka Koha (LAT)	219 kg	Yang Chunyuan (CHN)	218 kg	Rattanaphon Pakkaratha (THA)	213 kg
– 63 kg	Snatch	Zhou Xiaojing (CHN)	106 kg	Huang Ting (CHN)	105 kg	Natalia Llamosa (COL)	94 kg
– 63 kg	Clean & Jerk	Huang Ting (CHN)	134 kg	Zhou Xiaojing (CHN)	130 kg	Ana Lilia Durán (MEX)	122 kg
– 63 kg	Total	Huang Ting (CHN)	239 kg	Zhou Xiaojing (CHN)	236 kg	Florina Sorina Hulpan (ROU)	213 kg
– 69 kg	Snatch	Yi Chuwei (CHN)	104 kg	Aleksandra Kozlova (RUS)	103 kg	Rebekah Tiler (GBR)	102 kg
– 69 kg	Clean & Jerk	Yi Chuwei (CHN)	126 kg	Hanna Panova (UKR)	123 kg	Rebekah Tiler (GBR)	123 kg
– 69 kg	Total	Yi Chuwei (CHN)	230 kg	Rebekah Tiler (GBR)	225 kg	Hanna Panova (UKR)	223 kg
– 75 kg	Snatch	Neisi Dájomes (ECU)	108 kg	Anastasiia Shyshanova (UKR)	107 kg	Maria Tretyakova (RUS)	99 kg
– 75 kg	Clean & Jerk	Neisi Dájomes (ECU)	134 kg	Sona Poghosyan (ARM)	125 kg	Tamara Salazar (ECU)	124 kg
– 75 kg	Total	Neisi Dájomes (ECU)	242 kg	Anastasiia Shyshanova (UKR)	230 kg	Sona Poghosyan (ARM)	223 kg
– 90 kg	Snatch	Peng Lina (CHN)	107 kg	Valentyna Kisil (UKR)	106 kg	Eileen Cikamatana (FIJ)	97 kg
– 90 kg	Clean & Jerk	Peng Lina (CHN)	133 kg	Eileen Cikamatana (FIJ)	132 kg	Daria Riazanova (RUS)	127 kg
– 90 kg	Total	Peng Lina (CHN)	240 kg	Eileen Cikamatana (FIJ)	229 kg	Valentyna Kisil (UKR)	227 kg
+ 90 kg	Snatch	Sun Yongjie (CHN)	130 kg	Lisseth Ayoví (ECU)	111 kg	Duangaksorn Chaidee (THA)	110 kg
+ 90 kg	Clean & Jerk	Sun Yongjie (CHN)	151 kg	Duangaksorn Chaidee (THA)	150 kg	Lisseth Ayoví (ECU)	135 kg
+ 90 kg	Total	Sun Yongjie (CHN)	281 kg	Duangaksorn Chaidee (THA)	260 kg	Lisseth Ayoví (ECU)	246 kg

== Team ranking ==
Rank	Men's		Women's	
Rank	Team	Points	Team	Points
1	Iran	423	China	571
2	Japan	394	Ukraine	509
3	China	391	Ecuador	491
4	Colombia	346	United States	432
5	Belarus	339	Russia	420
6	Chinese Taipei	330	Thailand	383
7	United States	308	Japan	380
8	Georgia	278	Chinese Taipei	345
9	South Korea	276	Canada	226
10	Armenia	268	Turkey	210

== Points ==
Rank	Men's				Women's			
Rank	Athlete	Body Weight	Total	Points	Athlete	Body Weight	Total	Points
1	Simon Martirosyan (ARM)	113.45	426	453.3253	Huang Ting (CHN)	62.87	239	313.6256
2	Yeison López (COL)	76.35	356	446.3847	Zhou Xiaojing (CHN)	62.64	236	310.3814
3	Farkhodbek Sobirov (UZB)	92.86	390	445.1837	Rebeka Koha (LAT)	57.61	219	303.8524
4	Yauheni Tsikhantsou (BLR)	93.65	378	429.9787	Yang Chunyuan (CHN)	57.77	218	301.9062
5	Clarence Cummings (USA)	68.56	321	428.3666	Rattanaphon Pakkaratha (THA)	57.81	213	294.8459
6	Masanori Miyamoto (JPN)	68.92	320	425.6651	Zhu Qiaoling (CHN)	52.91	197	290.0215
7	Shakhzod Khudayberganov (UZB)	76.95	338	422.0234	Neisi Dájomes (ECU)	74.52	242	289.2011
8	Fares Ibrahim Elbakh (QAT)	84.75	353	419.6968	Yi Chuwei (CHN)	67.73	230	288.9977
9	Giorgi Chkheidze (GEO)	128.25	406	419.2596	Sun Yongjie (CHN)	118.16	281	287.6751
10	Viacheslav Iarkin (RUS)	76.74	335	418.8947	Thunya Sukcharoen (THA)	47.83	179	284.5301
