= List of Dutch records in Olympic weightlifting =

The following are the national records in Olympic weightlifting in the Netherlands. Records are maintained in each weight class for the snatch lift, clean and jerk lift, and the total for both lifts by the Dutch Weightlifting Association (Nederlandse Gewichthefbond).

== Current records ==
Key to tables: Awaiting ratification Not ratified or later rescinded by Dutch Weightlifting Association

=== Men ===
Event	Record	Athlete	Date	Meet	Place	Ref
60 kg
Snatch	97 kg	Standard				
Clean & Jerk	119 kg	Standard				
Total	216 kg	Standard				
65 kg
Snatch	104 kg	Standard				
Clean & Jerk	127 kg	Standard				
Total	231 kg	Standard				
70 kg
Snatch	109 kg	Standard				
Clean & Jerk	134 kg	Standard				
Total	243 kg	Standard				
75 kg
Snatch	114 kg	Standard				
Clean & Jerk	140 kg	Standard				
Total	253 kg	Standard				
85 kg
Snatch	121 kg	Standard				
Clean & Jerk	149 kg	Standard				
Total	270 kg	Standard				
95 kg
Snatch	127 kg	Standard				
Clean & Jerk	155 kg	Standard				
Total	282 kg	Standard				
110 kg
Snatch	133 kg	Standard				
Clean & Jerk	163 kg	Standard				
Total	296 kg	Standard				
+110 kg
Snatch	150 kg	Mattijs Mols	8 February 2026	Dutch Championships	Almere, Netherlands	
Clean & Jerk	175 kg	Mattijs Mols	8 February 2026	Dutch Championships	Almere, Netherlands	
Total	325 kg	Mattijs Mols	8 February 2026	Dutch Championships	Almere, Netherlands	

=== Women ===
Event	Record	Athlete	Date	Meet	Place	Ref
49 kg
Snatch	56 kg	Standard				
Clean & Jerk	69 kg	Standard				
Total	126 kg	Standard				
53 kg
Snatch	67 kg	Lynn de Gooijer	22 June 2025	Dutch Championships	Almere, Netherlands	
Clean & Jerk	82 kg	Lynn de Gooijer	21 October 2025	Dutch Team Championships	Eindhoven, Netherlands	
Total	147 kg	Lynn de Gooijer	22 June 2025	Dutch Championships	Almere, Netherlands	
57 kg
Snatch	82 kg	Marlous Schuilwerve	30 October 2026	World Championships	Ningbo, China	
Clean & Jerk	100 kg	Marlous Schuilwerve	30 October 2026	World Championships	Ningbo, China	
Total	182 kg	Marlous Schuilwerve	30 October 2026	World Championships	Ningbo, China	
61 kg
Snatch	66 kg	Standard				
Clean & Jerk	81 kg	Standard				
Total	146 kg	Standard				
69 kg
Snatch	91 kg	Myrthe Timmermans	22 April 2026	European Championships	Batumi, Georgia	
Clean & Jerk	112 kg	Myrthe Timmermans	3 November 2026	World Championships	Ningbo, China	
Total	202 kg	Myrthe Timmermans	22 April 2026	European Championships	Batumi, Georgia	
77 kg
Snatch	103 kg	Nikki Löwik	5 November 2026	World Championships	Ningbo, China	
Clean & Jerk	122 kg	Nikki Löwik	23 April 2026	European Championships	Batumi, Georgia	
Total	224 kg	Nikki Löwik	5 November 2026	World Championships	Ningbo, China	
86 kg
Snatch	97 kg	Joyce de Koning	8 February 2026	Dutch Championships	Almere, Netherlands	
Clean & Jerk	106 kg	Toscane Genee	22 June 2025	Dutch Championships	Almere, Netherlands	
Total	203 kg	Joyce de Koning	8 February 2026	Dutch Championships	Almere, Netherlands	
+86 kg
Snatch	79 kg	Standard				
Clean & Jerk	99 kg	Standard				
Total	178 kg	Standard				

== Historical records ==
=== Men (2025–2026) ===
Event	Record	Athlete	Date	Meet	Place	Ref
71 kg
Snatch	110 kg	Standard				
Clean & Jerk	135 kg	Standard				
Total	245 kg	Standard				
79 kg
Snatch	117 kg	Standard				
Clean & Jerk	143 kg	Standard				
Total	260 kg	Standard				
88 kg
Snatch	130 kg	Willem van der Wal	6 December 2025	Bars Cup	Arnhem, Netherlands	
Clean & Jerk	160 kg	Willem van der Wal	6 December 2025	Bars Cup	Arnhem, Netherlands	
Total	290 kg	Willem van der Wal	6 December 2025	Bars Cup	Arnhem, Netherlands	
94 kg
Snatch	140 kg	Stef Biemans	8 February 2026	Dutch Championships	Almere, Netherlands	
Clean & Jerk	155 kg	Standard				
Total	295 kg	Stef Biemans	8 February 2026	Dutch Championships	Almere, Netherlands	

=== Men (2018–2025) ===
Event	Record	Athlete	Date	Meet	Place	Ref
55 kg
Snatch	94 kg	Standard				
Clean & Jerk	116 kg	Standard				
Total	210 kg	Standard				
61 kg
Snatch	100 kg	Standard				
Clean & Jerk	123 kg	Standard				
Total	223 kg	Standard				
67 kg
Snatch	106 kg	Standard				
Clean & Jerk	130 kg	Standard				
Total	236 kg	Standard				
73 kg
Snatch	113 kg	Teun Bruijnen	20 April 2019			
Clean & Jerk	138 kg	Teun Bruijnen	20 April 2019			
Total	251 kg	Teun Bruijnen	20 April 2019			
81 kg
Snatch	126 kg	Omar Khathiri	26 March 2023	Dutch Championships		
Clean & Jerk	150 kg	Omar Khathiri	1 June 2022	European Championships	Tirana, Albania	
Total	273 kg	Omar Khathiri	1 June 2022	European Championships	Tirana, Albania	
89 kg
Snatch	139 kg	Karen Tovmasjan	19 January 2019	Dutch Championships		
Clean & Jerk	170 kg	Karen Tovmasjan	19 January 2019	Dutch Championships		
Total	309 kg	Karen Tovmasjan	19 January 2019	Dutch Championships		
96 kg
Snatch	142 kg	Stef Biemans	21 December 2024	Dutch Championships		
Clean & Jerk	165 kg	Stef Biemans	21 December 2024	Dutch Championships		
Total	307 kg	Stef Biemans	21 December 2024	Dutch Championships		
102 kg
Snatch	146 kg	Alexander Vermetten	10 November 2019	Dutch Open Championships		
Clean & Jerk	161 kg	Standard				
Total	293 kg	Standard				
109 kg
Snatch	138 kg	Alexander Vermetten	30 October 2022	SBD Cup	Nijmegen, Netherlands	
Clean & Jerk	166 kg	Standard				
Total	301 kg	Standard				
+109 kg
Snatch	183 kg	Enzo Kuworge	5 June 2022	European Championships	Tirana, Albania	
Clean & Jerk	234 kg	Enzo Kuworge	4 August 2021	Olympic Games	Tokyo, Japan	
Total	411 kg	Enzo Kuworge	31 May 2021	World Junior Championships	Tashkent, Uzbekistan	

=== Women (2025–2026) ===
Event	Record	Athlete	Date	Meet	Place	Ref
48 kg
Snatch	55 kg	Standard				
Clean & Jerk	68 kg	Standard				
Total	123 kg	Standard				
58 kg
Snatch	84 kg	Marlous Schuilwerve	3 October 2025	World Championships	Førde, Norway	
Clean & Jerk	103 kg	Eefke Drega	22 June 2025	Dutch Championships	Almere, Netherlands	
Total	184 kg	Marlous Schuilwerve	3 October 2025	World Championships	Førde, Norway	
63 kg
Snatch	86 kg	Marlous Schuilwerve	20 September 2025			
Clean & Jerk	102 kg	Marlous Schuilwerve	22 June 2025	Dutch Championships	Almere, Netherlands	
Total	186 kg	Marlous Schuilwerve	22 June 2025	Dutch Championships	Almere, Netherlands	

=== Women (2018–2025) ===
Event	Record	Athlete	Date	Meet	Place	Ref
45 kg
Snatch	52 kg	Standard				
Clean & Jerk	64 kg	Standard				
Total	116 kg	Standard				
49 kg
Snatch	56 kg	Standard				
Clean & Jerk	71 kg	Sharina Ramdien	26 March 2023	Dutch Championships		
Total	124 kg	Standard				
55 kg
Snatch	84 kg	Marlous Schuilwerve	14 April 2025	European Championships	Chișinău, Moldova	
Clean & Jerk	97 kg	Marlous Schuilwerve	14 April 2025	European Championships	Chișinău, Moldova	
Total	181 kg	Marlous Schuilwerve	14 April 2025	European Championships	Chișinău, Moldova	
59 kg
Snatch	85 kg	Sanne Bijleveld	5 April 2021	European Championships	Moscow, Russia	
Clean & Jerk	105 kg	Sanne Bijleveld	5 April 2021	European Championships	Moscow, Russia	
Total	190 kg	Sanne Bijleveld	5 April 2021	European Championships	Moscow, Russia	
64 kg
Snatch	90 kg	Myrthe Timmermans	24 September 2023	NK Teams Finale		
Clean & Jerk	110 kg	Myrthe Timmermans	17 December 2023	Dutch Open Championships		
Total	199 kg	Myrthe Timmermans	17 December 2023	Dutch Open Championships		
71 kg
Snatch	97 kg	Caroline Birch	12 March 2023	Dutch Strength Spring Cup		
Clean & Jerk	115 kg	Caroline Birch	12 March 2023	Dutch Strength Spring Cup		
Total	212 kg	Caroline Birch	12 March 2023	Dutch Strength Spring Cup		
76 kg
Snatch	97 kg	Nikki Löwik	22 October 2022	European U23 Championships	Durrës, Albania	
Clean & Jerk	118 kg	Nikki Löwik	20 April 2023	European Championships	Yerevan, Armenia	
Total	214 kg	Nikki Löwik	20 April 2023	European Championships	Yerevan, Armenia	
81 kg
Snatch	105 kg	Nikki Löwik	17 December 2023	Dutch Open Championships		
Clean & Jerk	129 kg	Nikki Löwik	1 August 2023	European U23 Championships	Bucharest, Romania	
Total	231 kg	Nikki Löwik	1 August 2023	European U23 Championships	Bucharest, Romania	
87 kg
Snatch	96 kg	Joyce de Koning	21 December 2024	Dutch Championships		
Clean & Jerk	111 kg	Joyce de Koning	21 December 2024	Dutch Championships		
Total	207 kg	Joyce de Koning	21 December 2024	Dutch Championships		
+87 kg
Snatch	92 kg	Danique Schepens	26 March 2023	Dutch Championships		
Clean & Jerk	116 kg	Danique Schepens	14 September 2024	SBD Cup		
Total	206 kg	Danique Schepens	14 September 2024	SBD Cup		
