= Luo Xiaomin =

Chinese weightlifter (born 1999)

Personal information
- Nationality: China
- Born: 14 November 1999 (age 26)
- Weight: 59.00 kg (130 lb)

Sport
- Country: China
- Sport: Weightlifting
- Event: 59 kg
Medal record
Asian Indoor and Martial Arts Games
Gold medal – first place	2017 Ashgabat	–58 kg

Luo Xiaomin (Chinese: 罗小敏; born 14 November 1999) is a Chinese weightlifter competing in the 59 kg division.

She currently holds the junior world record in the snatch.

== Career ==
She competed at the 5th International Qatar Cup in the 59 kg category winning the silver medal in the total behind Kuo Hsing-chun.

She won the gold medal in the women's 59 kg Snatch event at the 2022 World Weightlifting Championships held in Bogotá, Colombia.

== Major results ==
Year	Venue	Weight	Snatch (kg)				Clean & Jerk (kg)				Total	Rank
Year	Venue	Weight	1	2	3	Rank	1	2	3	Rank	Total	Rank
Qatar Cup
2018	Doha, Qatar	59 kg	93	98	101	2nd place, silver medalist(s)	115	120	123	3rd place, bronze medalist(s)	224	2nd place, silver medalist(s)
