= List of Romanian records in Olympic weightlifting =

The following are the national records in Olympic weightlifting in Romania. Records are maintained in each weight class for the snatch lift, clean and jerk lift, and the total for both lifts by the Federația Română de Haltere.

== Current records ==
=== Men ===
Event	Record	Athlete	Date	Meet	Place	Ref
60 kg
Snatch	115 kg	Narcis Papolti	2 December 2025	Balkan Championships	Durrës, Albania	
Clean & Jerk	142 kg	Narcis Papolti	2 December 2025	Balkan Championships	Durrës, Albania	
Total	257 kg	Narcis Papolti	2 December 2025	Balkan Championships	Durrës, Albania	
65 kg
Snatch	127 kg	Ion Daniel Dorobete	2 December 2025	Balkan Championships	Durrës, Albania	
Clean & Jerk	147 kg	Ion Daniel Dorobete	2 December 2025	Balkan Championships	Durrës, Albania	
Total	274 kg	Ion Daniel Dorobete	2 December 2025	Balkan Championships	Durrës, Albania	
71 kg
Snatch						
Clean & Jerk						
Total						
79 kg
Snatch	155 kg	Tiberiu Donose	31 October 2025	European Junior Championships	Durrës, Albania	
Clean & Jerk	177 kg	Tiberiu Donose	31 October 2025	European Junior Championships	Durrës, Albania	
Total	332 kg	Tiberiu Donose	31 October 2025	European Junior Championships	Durrës, Albania	
88 kg
Snatch						
Clean & Jerk						
Total						
94 kg
Snatch						
Clean & Jerk						
Total						
110 kg
Snatch	195 kg	Luis Lauret	25 April 2026	European Championships	Batumi, Georgia	
Clean & Jerk	219 kg	Luis Lauret	25 April 2026	European Championships	Batumi, Georgia	
Total	414 kg	Luis Lauret	25 April 2026	European Championships	Batumi, Georgia	
+110 kg
Snatch						
Clean & Jerk						
Total						

=== Women ===
Event	Record	Athlete	Date	Meet	Place	Ref
48 kg
Snatch						
Clean & Jerk						
Total						
53 kg
Snatch	95 kg	Mihaela Cambei	28 October 2025	European U23 Championships	Durrës, Albania	
Clean & Jerk	114 kg	Mihaela Cambei	3 October 2025	World Championships	Førde, Norway	
Total	208 kg	Mihaela Cambei	3 October 2025	World Championships	Førde, Norway	
58 kg
Snatch						
Clean & Jerk						
Total						
63 kg
Snatch						
Clean & Jerk						
Total						
69 kg
Snatch						
Clean & Jerk						
Total						
77 kg
Snatch						
Clean & Jerk						
Total						
86 kg
Snatch						
Clean & Jerk						
Total						
+86 kg
Snatch						
Clean & Jerk						
Total						

== Historical records ==
=== Men (2018–2025) ===
Event	Record	Athlete	Date	Meet	Place	Ref
55 kg
Snatch	109 kg	Valentin Iancu	16 April 2023	European Championships	Yerevan, Armenia	
Clean & Jerk	140 kg	Valentin Iancu	4 April 2021	European Championships	Moscow, Russia	
Total	248 kg	Valentin Iancu	4 April 2021	European Championships	Moscow, Russia	
61 kg
Snatch	120 kg	Cosmin Isofache	16 April 2023	European Championships	Yerevan, Armenia	
Clean & Jerk	154 kg	Valentin Iancu	13 February 2024	European Championships	Sofia, Bulgaria	
Total	270 kg	Cosmin Isofache	16 April 2023	European Championships	Yerevan, Armenia	
67 kg
Snatch						
Clean & Jerk						
Total						
73 kg
Snatch	139 kg	Tiberiu Donose	19 October 2022	European Junior Championships	Durrës, Albania	
Clean & Jerk	161 kg	Tiberiu Donose	19 October 2022	European Junior Championships	Durrës, Albania	
Total	300 kg	Tiberiu Donose	19 October 2022	European Junior Championships	Durrës, Albania	
81 kg
Snatch						
Clean & Jerk						
Total						
89 kg
Snatch						
Clean & Jerk						
Total						
96 kg
Snatch						
Clean & Jerk						
Total						
102 kg
Snatch						
Clean & Jerk						
Total						
109 kg
Snatch						
Clean & Jerk						
Total						
+109 kg
Snatch						
Clean & Jerk						
Total						

=== Women (2018–2025) ===
Event	Record	Athlete	Date	Meet	Place	Ref
45 kg
Snatch	70 kg	Adriana Pană	15 April 2023	European Championships	Yerevan, Armenia	
Clean & Jerk	84 kg	Adriana Pană	3 April 2021	European Championships	Moscow, Russia	
Total	153 kg	Adriana Pană	15 April 2023	European Championships	Yerevan, Armenia	
49 kg
Snatch	93 kg	Mihaela Cambei	7 August 2024	Olympic Games	Paris, France	
Clean & Jerk	112 kg	Mihaela Cambei	7 August 2024	Olympic Games	Paris, France	
Total	205 kg	Mihaela Cambei	7 August 2024	Olympic Games	Paris, France	
55 kg
Snatch	97 kg	Cristina Iovu	3 November 2018	World Championships	Ashgabat, Turkmenistan	
Clean & Jerk	123 kg	Cristina Iovu	3 November 2018	World Championships	Ashgabat, Turkmenistan	
Total	220 kg	Cristina Iovu	3 November 2018	World Championships	Ashgabat, Turkmenistan	
59 kg
Snatch	95 kg	Irina-Lacramioara Lepsa	December 2019	Qatar Cup	Doha, Qatar	
Clean & Jerk	118 kg	Andreea Cotruţa	14 February 2024	European Championships	Sofia, Bulgaria	
Total	210 kg	Irina-Lacramioara Lepsa	December 2019	Qatar Cup	Doha, Qatar	
64 kg
Snatch	114 kg	Loredana Toma	6 April 2021	European Championships	Moscow, Russia	
Clean & Jerk	136 kg	Loredana Toma	29 January 2020	World Cup	Rome, Italy	
Total	249 kg	Loredana Toma	29 January 2020	World Cup	Rome, Italy	
71 kg
Snatch	119 kg	Loredana Toma	12 December 2022	World Championships	Bogotá, Colombia	
Clean & Jerk	137 kg	Loredana Toma	12 December 2022	World Championships	Bogotá, Colombia	
Total	256 kg	Loredana Toma	12 December 2022	World Championships	Bogotá, Colombia	
76 kg
Snatch						
Clean & Jerk						
Total						
81 kg
Snatch						
Clean & Jerk						
Total						
87 kg
Snatch						
Clean & Jerk	121 kg	Alexandra Alexe	19 February 2024	European Championships	Sofia, Bulgaria	
Total						
+87 kg
Snatch						
Clean & Jerk						
Total						
