= 2017 World Weightlifting Championships – Women's 48 kg =

2017 weightlifting championship

The Women's 48 kg competition at the 2017 World Weightlifting Championships was held on 29 November 2017.

== Schedule ==
Date	Time	Event
28 November 2017	13:55	Group B
29 November 2017	17:25	Group A

== Medalists ==
Event	Gold		Silver		Bronze	
Snatch	Thunya Sukcharoen (THA)	86 kg	Mirabai Chanu (IND)	85 kg	Ana Segura (COL)	81 kg
Clean & Jerk	Mirabai Chanu (IND)	109 kg	Thunya Sukcharoen (THA)	107 kg	Chiraphan Nanthawong (THA)	102 kg
Total	Mirabai Chanu (IND)	194 kg	Thunya Sukcharoen (THA)	193 kg	Ana Segura (COL)	182 kg

== Records ==
Prior to this competition, the existing world records were as follows.

World record	Snatch	Yang Lian (CHN)	98 kg	Santo Domingo, Dominican	1 October 2006
World record	Clean & Jerk	~~Nurcan Taylan (TUR)~~; Chen Xiexia (CHN)	~~121 kg~~ 120 kg	~~Antalya, Turkey~~; Tai'an, China	~~17 September 2010~~; 21 April 2007
World record	Total	Yang Lian (CHN)	217 kg	Santo Domingo, Dominican	1 October 2006

- Nurcan Taylan's world record was rescinded in 2021.

== Results ==
Rank	Athlete	Group	Snatch (kg)				Clean & Jerk (kg)				Total
Rank	Athlete	Group	1	2	3	Rank	1	2	3	Rank	Total
1st place, gold medalist(s)	Mirabai Chanu (IND)	A	83	~~85~~	85	2nd place, silver medalist(s)	103	107	109	1st place, gold medalist(s)	194
2nd place, silver medalist(s)	Thunya Sukcharoen (THA)	A	83	86	~~88~~	1st place, gold medalist(s)	105	107	~~109~~	2nd place, silver medalist(s)	193
3rd place, bronze medalist(s)	Ana Segura (COL)	A	78	81	~~83~~	3rd place, bronze medalist(s)	98	101	~~104~~	4	182
4	Vương Thị Huyền (VIE)	A	80	~~84~~	~~84~~	4	~~100~~	~~100~~	100	5	180
5	Chiraphan Nanthawong (THA)	A	75	77	~~79~~	9	97	99	102	3rd place, bronze medalist(s)	179
6	Elena Andrieș (ROU)	A	~~77~~	77	79	5	91	95	98	7	177
7	Alyssa Ritchey (USA)	A	~~75~~	75	78	8	95	99	~~101~~	6	177
8	Anaïs Michel (FRA)	A	~~78~~	78	~~80~~	7	97	~~100~~	~~100~~	8	175
9	Carolina Valencia (MEX)	B	73	75	~~77~~	10	95	~~98~~	~~98~~	10	170
10	Mizuki Yanagida (JPN)	B	70	72	74	11	90	93	95	11	169
11	Amanda Braddock (CAN)	B	71	~~74~~	74	12	~~91~~	91	~~95~~	13	165
12	Genny Pagliaro (ITA)	A	73	~~75~~	~~75~~	13	~~92~~	~~92~~	92	12	165
13	Angélica Campoverde (ECU)	B	70	73	~~75~~	14	90	~~93~~	~~93~~	14	163
14	Ibuki Takahashi (JPN)	B	68	70	72	15	~~90~~	90	~~93~~	16	162
15	Fiorella Cueva (PER)	B	63	66	~~68~~	17	87	90	~~92~~	15	156
—	Nguyễn Thị Thúy (VIE)	A	76	78	~~80~~	6	~~104~~	~~104~~	~~104~~	—	—
—	Daniela Pandova (BUL)	B	~~69~~	~~69~~	69	16	~~88~~	~~88~~	~~88~~	—	—
—	Manon Lorentz (FRA)	B	~~75~~	~~75~~	~~75~~	—	—	—	—	—	—
—	Andrea de la Herrán (MEX)	B	~~74~~	~~74~~	~~74~~	—	~~90~~	~~90~~	~~90~~	—	—
—	Ýulduz Jumabaýewa (TKM)	A	~~78~~	~~78~~	~~78~~	—	95	~~100~~	~~104~~	9	—
