= 5th International Qatar Cup =

- Location: Doha, Qatar
- Dates: 19–23 December
- Competitors: 117 from 35 nations

The 5th International Qatar Cup was held in Doha, Qatar from 19 to 22 December 2018.

== Medal overview ==
=== Men ===
Event		Gold		Silver		Bronze	
– 61 kg	Snatch	Hayato Hirai (JPN)	124 kg	Igor Son (KAZ)	118 kg	Shin Oshida (JPN)	115 kg
– 61 kg	Clean & Jerk	Shin Oshida (JPN)	149 kg	Igor Son (KAZ)	149 kg	Hayato Hirai (JPN)	148 kg
– 61 kg	Total	Hayato Hirai (JPN)	272 kg	Igor Son (KAZ)	267 kg	Shin Oshida (JPN)	264 kg
– 67 kg	Snatch	Adkhamjon Ergashev (UZB)	142 kg	Bernardin Matam (FRA)	138 kg	Doston Yokubov (UZB)	138 kg
– 67 kg	Clean & Jerk	Doston Yokubov (UZB)	175 kg	Bernardin Matam (FRA)	170 kg	Adkhamjon Ergashev (UZB)	168 kg
– 67 kg	Total	Doston Yokubov (UZB)	313 kg	Adkhamjon Ergashev (UZB)	310 kg	Bernardin Matam (FRA)	308 kg
– 73 kg	Snatch	Vadzim Likharad (BLR)	150 kg	Dimitrios Georgoulis (GRE)	125 kg		
– 73 kg	Clean & Jerk	Vadzim Likharad (BLR)	184 kg	Dimitrios Georgoulis (GRE)	158 kg		
– 73 kg	Total	Vadzim Likharad (BLR)	334 kg	Dimitrios Georgoulis (GRE)	283 kg		
– 81 kg	Snatch	Rejepbaý Rejepow (TKM)	162 kg	Andranik Karapetyan (ARM)	161 kg	Ritvars Suharevs (LAT)	157 kg
– 81 kg	Clean & Jerk	Ritvars Suharevs (LAT)	194 kg	Rejepbaý Rejepow (TKM)	192 kg	Aidar Kazov (KAZ)	185 kg
– 81 kg	Total	Rejepbaý Rejepow (TKM)	354 kg	Ritvars Suharevs (LAT)	351 kg	Andranik Karapetyan (ARM)	341 kg
– 96 kg	Snatch	Faris Ibrahim (QAT)	172 kg	Yauheni Tsikhantsou (BLR)	170 kg	Tian Fuxuan (CHN)	170 kg
– 96 kg	Clean & Jerk	Faris Ibrahim (QAT)	225 kg	Tian Fuxuan (CHN)	212 kg	Yauheni Tsikhantsou (BLR)	211 kg
– 96 kg	Total	Faris Ibrahim (QAT)	397 kg	Tian Fuxuan (CHN)	382 kg	Yauheni Tsikhantsou (BLR)	381 kg
– 109 kg	Snatch	Andrei Aramnau (BLR)	183 kg	Akbar Djuraev (UZB)	179 kg	Nima Motaleghi (IRI)	175 kg
– 109 kg	Clean & Jerk	Artūrs Plēsnieks (LAT)	220 kg	Andrei Aramnau (BLR)	218 kg	Akbar Djuraev (UZB)	213 kg
– 109 kg	Total	Andrei Aramnau (BLR)	401 kg	Artūrs Plēsnieks (LAT)	394 kg	Akbar Djuraev (UZB)	392 kg
+ 109 kg	Snatch	Ai Yunan (CHN)	193 kg	Homayoun Teymouri (IRI)	191 kg	Péter Nagy (HUN)	185 kg
+ 109 kg	Clean & Jerk	Ai Yunan (CHN)	237 kg	Hojamuhammet Toýçyýew (TKM)	228 kg	Péter Nagy (HUN)	224 kg
+ 109 kg	Total	Ai Yunan (CHN)	430 kg	Homayoun Teymouri (IRI)	414 kg	Péter Nagy (HUN)	409 kg

=== Women ===
Event		Gold		Silver		Bronze	
– 49 kg	Snatch	Zhang Rong (CHN)	92 kg	Elena Andrieș (ROU)	86 kg	Cortney Batchelor (USA)	76 kg
– 49 kg	Clean & Jerk	Zhang Rong (CHN)	103 kg	Elena Andrieș (ROU)	101 kg	Ýulduz Jumabaýewa (TKM)	100 kg
– 49 kg	Total	Zhang Rong (CHN)	195 kg	Elena Andrieș (ROU)	187 kg	Mizuki Yanagida (JPN)	176 kg
– 55 kg	Snatch	Rebekka Tao Jacobsen (NOR)	76 kg	Sabina Azimova (AZE)	74 kg	Yipang Patseang (TPE)	74 kg
– 55 kg	Clean & Jerk	Rebekka Tao Jacobsen (NOR)	99 kg	Yipang Patseang (TPE)	94 kg	Sabina Azimova (AZE)	92 kg
– 55 kg	Total	Rebekka Tao Jacobsen (NOR)	175 kg	Yipang Patseang (TPE)	168 kg	Sabina Azimova (AZE)	166 kg
– 59 kg	Snatch	Kuo Hsing-chun (TPE)	103 kg	Luo Xiaomin (CHN)	101 kg	Rebeka Koha (LAT)	100 kg
– 59 kg	Clean & Jerk	Kuo Hsing-chun (TPE)	130 kg	Zhang Yujuan (CHN)	126 kg	Luo Xiaomin (CHN)	123 kg
– 59 kg	Total	Kuo Hsing-chun (TPE)	233 kg	Luo Xiaomin (CHN)	224 kg	Zhang Yujuan (CHN)	224 kg
– 64 kg	Snatch	Huang Ting (CHN)	105 kg	Florina Sorina Hulpan (ROU)	96 kg	Karina Goricheva (KAZ)	95 kg
– 64 kg	Clean & Jerk	Huang Ting (CHN)	127 kg	Janelle Shafer (USA)	115 kg	Yuliia Shymechko (KAZ)	95 kg
– 64 kg	Total	Huang Ting (CHN)	232 kg	Janelle Shafer (USA)	210 kg	Florina Sorina Hulpan (ROU)	206 kg
– 76 kg	Snatch	Su Xiaoqiong (CHN)	113 kg	Tayler Harris (USA)	92 kg	Nicole Denies (USA)	90 kg
– 76 kg	Clean & Jerk	Su Xiaoqiong (CHN)	140 kg	Tayler Harris (USA)	110 kg	Nicole Denies (USA)	110 kg
– 76 kg	Total	Su Xiaoqiong (CHN)	253 kg	Tayler Harris (USA)	202 kg	Nicole Denies (USA)	200 kg
– 87 kg	Snatch	Raushan Meshitkhanova (KAZ)	100 kg	Krisztina Magát (HUN)	96 kg	Eleni Konstantinidi (GRE)	86 kg
– 87 kg	Clean & Jerk	Krisztina Magát (HUN)	120 kg	Raushan Meshitkhanova (KAZ)	115 kg	Eleni Konstantinidi (GRE)	110 kg
– 87 kg	Total	Krisztina Magát (HUN)	216 kg	Raushan Meshitkhanova (KAZ)	215 kg	Eleni Konstantinidi (GRE)	196 kg
+ 87 kg	Snatch	Zhou Xiaoman (CHN)	128 kg	Anastasiya Lysenko (UKR)	112 kg	NA	NA
+ 87 kg	Clean & Jerk	Zhou Xiaoman (CHN)	175 kg	Anastasiya Lysenko (UKR)	140 kg	NA	NA
+ 87 kg	Total	Zhou Xiaoman (CHN)	303 kg	Anastasiya Lysenko (UKR)	252 kg	NA	NA
