= Weightlifting at the 2018 Summer Youth Olympics – Girls' 48 kg =

Girls' 48 kg at the III Summer Youth Olympic Games
- Venue: Parque Polideportivo Roca
- Dates: October 8
- Competitors: 7 from 7 nations

Medalists
1st place, gold medalist(s)		Yesica Hernández; Mexico
2nd place, silver medalist(s)		Yineth Santoya; Colombia
3rd place, bronze medalist(s)		Mihaela Cambei; Romania

These are the results for the girls' 48 kg event at the 2018 Summer Youth Olympics.

== Results ==
Rank	Name	Nation	Body Weight	Snatch (kg)				Clean & Jerk (kg)				Total (kg)
Rank	Name	Nation	Body Weight	1	2	3	Res	1	2	3	Res	Total (kg)
1st place, gold medalist(s)	Yesica Hernández	Mexico		~~72~~	72	74	74	92	95	97	97	171
2nd place, silver medalist(s)	Yineth Santoya	Colombia		72	74	76	76	82	86	~~91~~	86	162
3rd place, bronze medalist(s)	Mihaela Cambei	Romania		67	70	~~72~~	70	84	88	~~90~~	88	158
4	Dahiana Ortiz	Dominican Republic		68	70	~~72~~	70	86	~~89~~	~~90~~	86	156
5	Sneha Soren	India		64	~~67~~	67	67	~~84~~	84	~~87~~	84	151
6	Maryam Ahmed	Bahrain		~~43~~	43	~~47~~	43	57	~~62~~	62	62	105
	Giulia Imperio	Italy		~~67~~	~~67~~	~~67~~						DNF

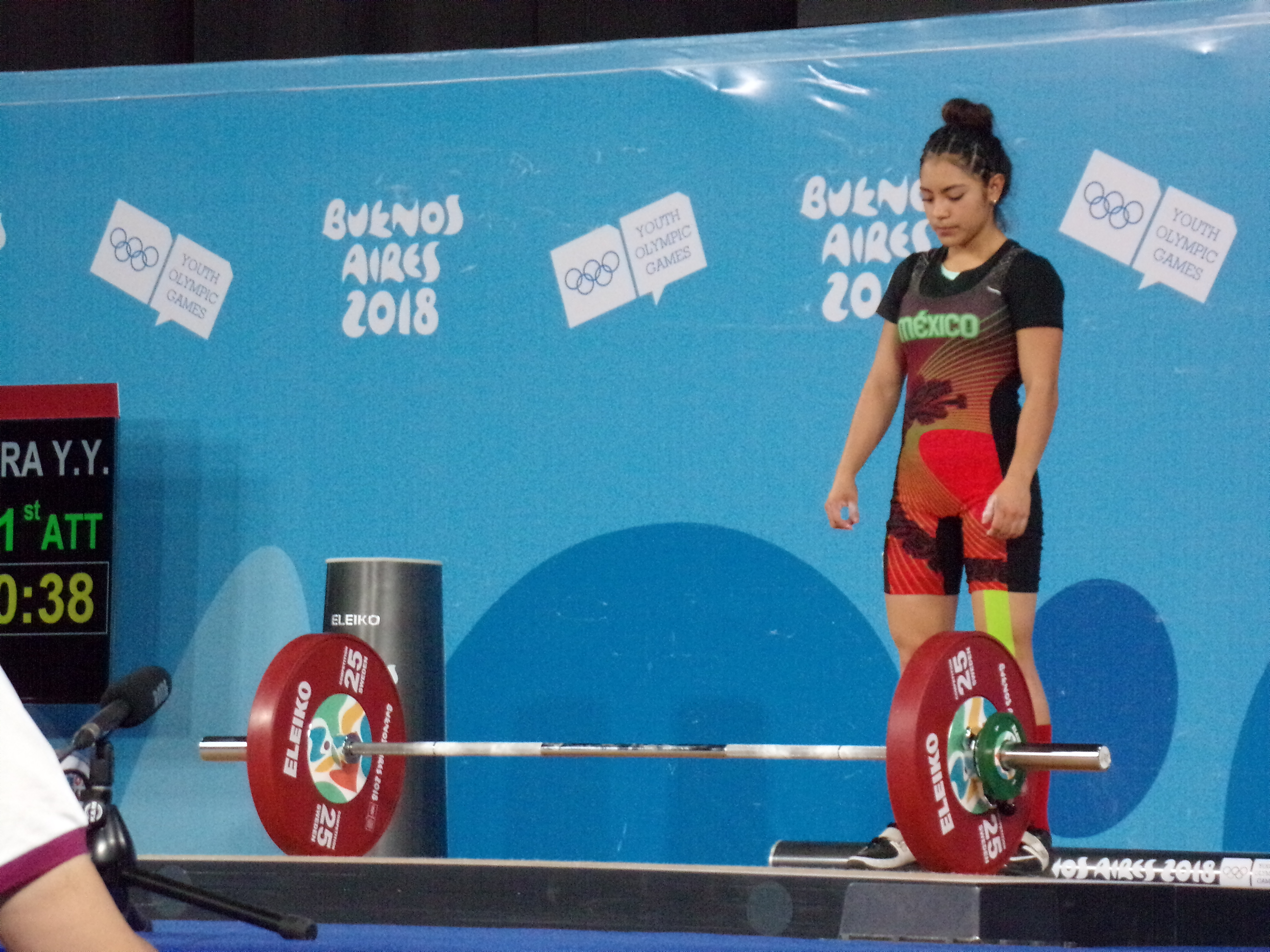
Yesica Yadira Hernández Vieyra

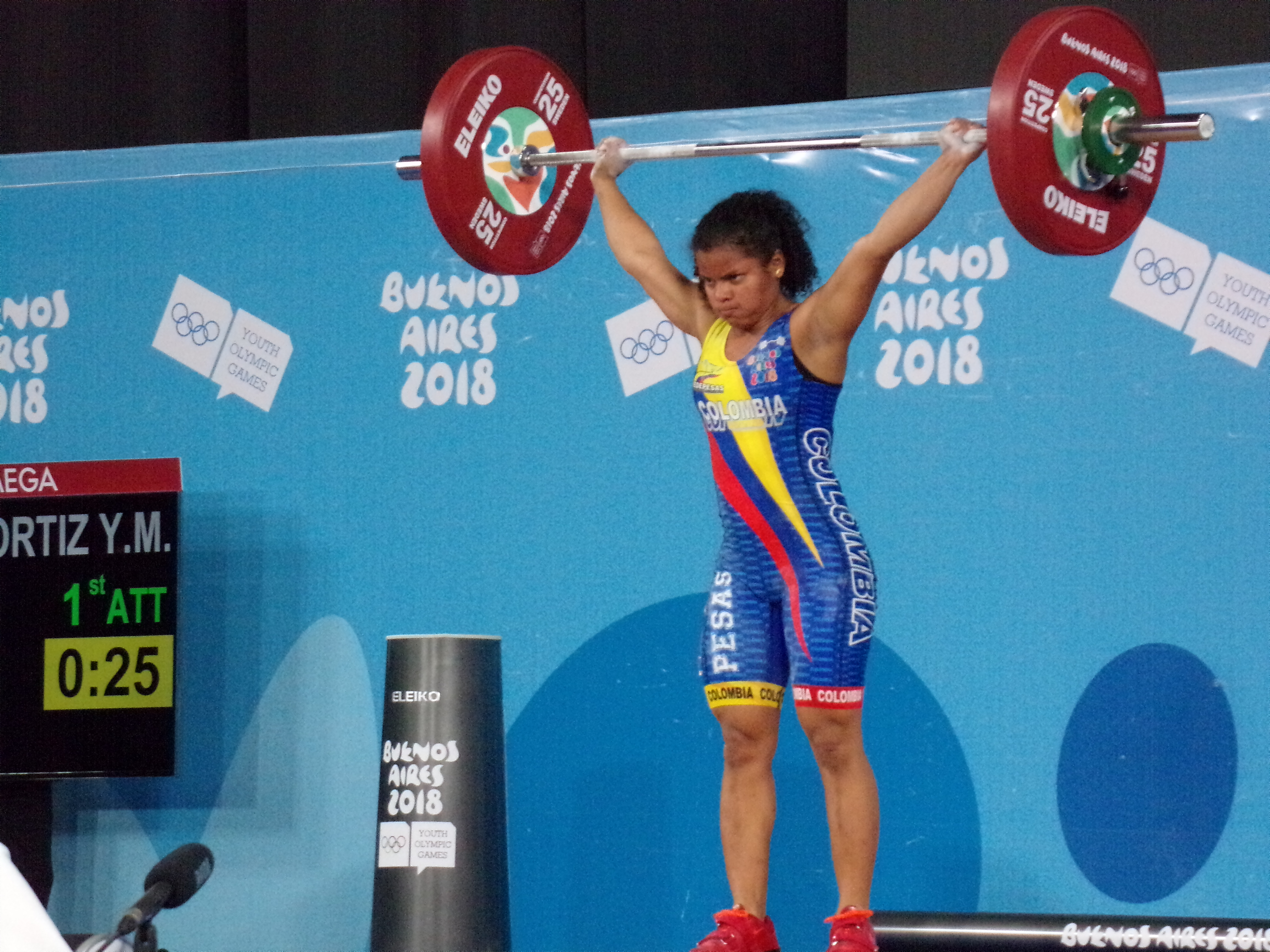
Yineth Milena Santoya Ortiz

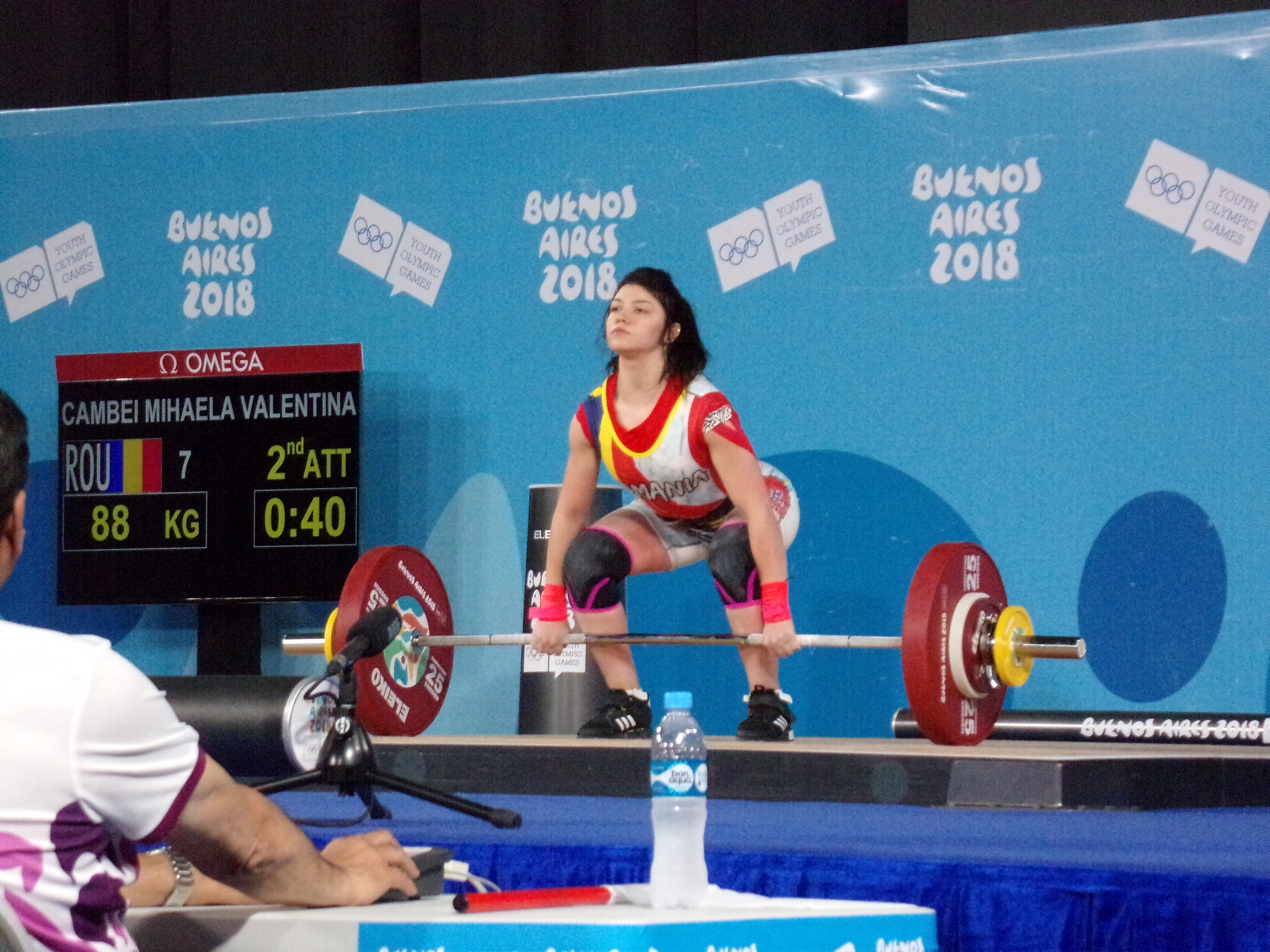
Mihaela Cambei

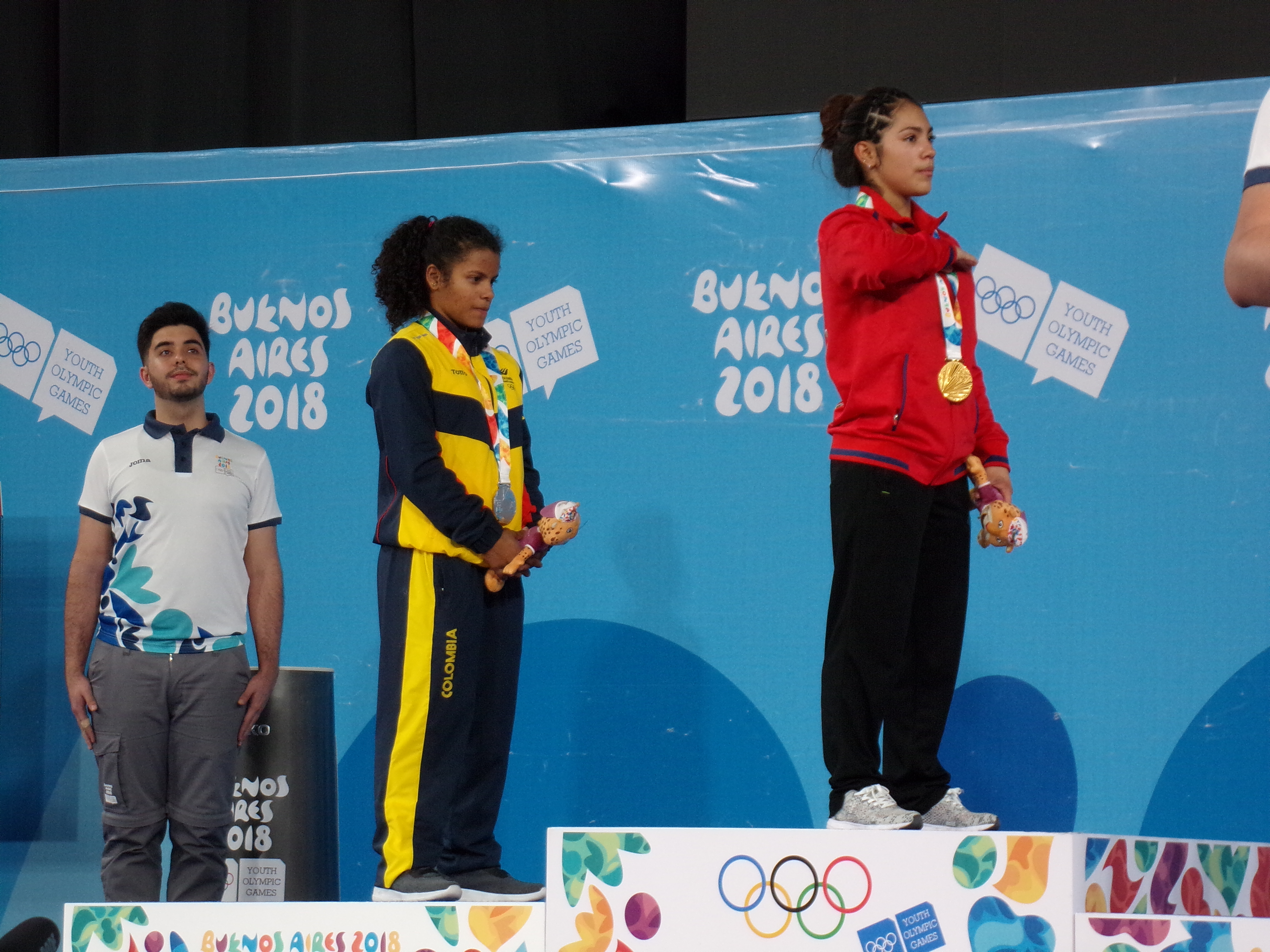
Victory ceremony
