= Huang Ting (weightlifter) =

Chinese weightlifter (born 1999)

Personal information
- Nationality: China
- Born: 16 January 1999 (age 27)
- Weight: 62.87 kg (139 lb)

Sport
- Country: China
- Sport: Weightlifting
- Event: –64 kg
Medal record
Representing China

Huang Ting (born 16 January 1999) is a Chinese weightlifter competing in the −64 kg division.

She currently holds all junior world records in the snatch, clean & jerk and total in the 64 kg category.

== Career ==
She won the 2017 Junior World Weightlifting Championships in the 63 kg division.

She competed at the 5th International Qatar Cup in the 64 kg division, sweeping gold medals in all lifts and setting junior world records in the snatch, clean & jerk and total.

== Major results ==
Year	Venue	Weight	Snatch (kg)				Clean & Jerk (kg)				Total	Rank
Year	Venue	Weight	1	2	3	Rank	1	2	3	Rank	Total	Rank
Junior World Weightlifting Championships
2017	Tokyo, Japan	63 kg	100	103	105	2nd place, silver medalist(s)	125	131	134	1st place, gold medalist(s)	239	1st place, gold medalist(s)
Qatar Cup
2018	Doha, Qatar	64 kg	98	103	105	1st place, gold medalist(s)	~~121~~	121	127	1st place, gold medalist(s)	232	1st place, gold medalist(s)
British International Open
2019	(United Kingdom) Coventry, Great Britain	71 kg	95	~~100~~	~~103~~	2	115	120	126	2	221	2nd place, silver medalist(s)
