= Surodchana Khambao =

Thai weightlifter (born 1999)

Personal information
- Nickname: Oil
- Born: 23 December 1999 (age 26) Chiang Khong, Chiang Rai, Thailand

Sport
- Country: Thailand
- Sport: Weightlifting
- Weight class: 49 kg
Medal record
Women's weightlifting
Representing Thailand
Olympic Games
Bronze medal – third place	2024 Paris	–49 kg
World Championships
Gold medal – first place	2021 Tashkent	49 kg
Bronze medal – third place	2025 Førde	53 kg
Asian Games
Bronze medal – third place	2018 Jakarta	53 kg
Bronze medal – third place	2026 Aichi–Nagoya	53 kg
Asian Championships
Bronze medal – third place	2023 Jinju	49 kg
Southeast Asian Games
Gold medal – first place	2021 Vietnam	49 kg
Gold medal – first place	2025 Thailand	53 kg
Junior World Championships
Gold medal – first place	2018 Tashkent	53 kg

Surodchana Khambao (Thai: สุรจนา คำเบ้า; born 23 December 1999) is a Thai weightlifter. She won the bronze medal in the women's 49 kg event at the 2024 Summer Olympics held in Paris, France. She won the gold medal in the women's 49 kg event at the 2021 World Weightlifting Championships held in Tashkent, Uzbekistan.

== Career ==
Khambao competed at the 2017 Asian Indoor and Martial Arts Games held in Ashgabat, Turkmenistan in the women's 53 kg event without winning a medal. She finished in 5th place.

In 2018, Khambao won all three gold medals in the women's 53 kg event at the Junior World Weightlifting Championships held in Tashkent, Uzbekistan. She also won the bronze medal in the women's 53 kg event at the 2018 Asian Games held in Jakarta, Indonesia.

Khambao finished in 4th place in the women's 49 kg event at the 2023 World Weightlifting Championships held in Riyadh, Saudi Arabia.

Khambao won the bronze medal in the women's 49 kg event at the 2024 Summer Olympics held in Paris, France. She was 1 kg ahead of India's Saikhom Mirabai Chanu who finished fourth.

== Achievements ==
Year	Venue	Weight	Snatch (kg)				Clean & Jerk (kg)				Total	Rank
Year	Venue	Weight	1	2	3	Rank	1	2	3	Rank	Total	Rank
Summer Olympics
2024	Paris, France	49 kg	86	~~88~~	88	—N/a	110	112	~~114~~	—N/a	200	3rd place, bronze medalist(s)
World Championships
2021	Tashkent, Uzbekistan	49 kg	82	84	86	1st place, gold medalist(s)	103	105	~~110~~	1st place, gold medalist(s)	191	1st place, gold medalist(s)
2023	Riyadh, Saudi Arabia	49 kg	85	~~87~~	87	5	107	~~109~~	109	4	196	4
2025	Førde, Norway	53 kg	88	~~90~~	90	5	110	~~112~~	~~112~~	4	200	3rd place, bronze medalist(s)
IWF World Cup
2024	Phuket, Thailand	49 kg	85	~~88~~	~~88~~	7	106	109	~~111~~	5	194	5
Asian Games
2018	Jakarta, Indonesia	53 kg	~~86~~	86	~~89~~	—N/a	107	110	115	—N/a	201	3rd place, bronze medalist(s)
Asian Championships
2017	Ashgabat, Turkmenistan	53 kg	76	~~80~~	80	4	95	~~101~~	~~101~~	4	175	4
2023	Jinju, South Korea	49 kg	~~88~~	88	90	4	110	~~112~~	~~112~~	4	200	3rd place, bronze medalist(s)
2024	Tashkent, Uzbekistan	49 kg	~~84~~	84	~~86~~	3rd place, bronze medalist(s)	~~103~~	103	106	3rd place, bronze medalist(s)	190	4
