= List of United States Supreme Court cases, volume 266 =

Supreme Court of the United States
- Interactive map of Supreme Court of the United States
- 38°53′26″N 77°00′16″W
- Established: March 4, 1789; 236 years ago
- Location: Washington, D.C.
- Coordinates: 38°53′26″N 77°00′16″W
- Composition method: Presidential nomination with Senate confirmation
- Authorised by: Constitution of the United States, Art. III, § 1
- Judge term length: life tenure, subject to impeachment and removal
- Number of positions: 9 (by statute)
- Website: supremecourt.gov

This is a list of cases reported in volume 266 of United States Reports, decided by the Supreme Court of the United States in 1924 and 1925.

== Justices of the Supreme Court at the time of volume 266 U.S. ==
The Supreme Court is established by Article III, Section 1 of the Constitution of the United States, which says: "The judicial Power of the United States, shall be vested in one supreme Court . . .". The size of the Court is not specified; the Constitution leaves it to Congress to set the number of justices. Under the Judiciary Act of 1789 Congress originally fixed the number of justices at six (one chief justice and five associate justices). Since 1789 Congress has varied the size of the Court from six to seven, nine, ten, and back to nine justices (always including one chief justice).

When the cases in volume 266 were decided the Court comprised the following nine members:

| Portrait | Justice | Office | Home State | Succeeded | Date confirmed by the Senate (Vote) | Tenure on Supreme Court |
|---|---|---|---|---|---|---|
| | William Howard Taft | Chief Justice | Connecticut | Edward Douglass White | June 30, 1921 (Acclamation) | July 11, 1921 – February 3, 1930 (Retired) |
| | Joseph McKenna | Associate Justice | California | Stephen Johnson Field | January 21, 1898 (Acclamation) | January 26, 1898 – January 5, 1925 (Retired) |
| | Oliver Wendell Holmes Jr. | Associate Justice | Massachusetts | Horace Gray | December 4, 1902 (Acclamation) | December 8, 1902 – January 12, 1932 (Retired) |
| | Willis Van Devanter | Associate Justice | Wyoming | Edward Douglass White (as Associate Justice) | December 15, 1910 (Acclamation) | January 3, 1911 – June 2, 1937 (Retired) |
| | James Clark McReynolds | Associate Justice | Tennessee | Horace Harmon Lurton | August 29, 1914 (44–6) | October 12, 1914 – January 31, 1941 (Retired) |
| | Louis Brandeis | Associate Justice | Massachusetts | Joseph Rucker Lamar | June 1, 1916 (47–22) | June 5, 1916 – February 13, 1939 (Retired) |
| | George Sutherland | Associate Justice | Utah | John Hessin Clarke | September 5, 1922 (Acclamation) | October 2, 1922 – January 17, 1938 (Retired) |
| | Pierce Butler | Associate Justice | Minnesota | William R. Day | December 21, 1922 (61–8) | January 2, 1923 – November 16, 1939 (Died) |
| | Edward Terry Sanford | Associate Justice | Tennessee | Mahlon Pitney | January 29, 1923 (Acclamation) | February 19, 1923 – March 8, 1930 (Died) |

== Citation style ==
Under the Judiciary Act of 1789 the federal court structure at the time comprised District Courts, which had general trial jurisdiction; Circuit Courts, which had mixed trial and appellate (from the US District Courts) jurisdiction; and the United States Supreme Court, which had appellate jurisdiction over the federal District and Circuit courts—and for certain issues over state courts. The Supreme Court also had limited original jurisdiction (i.e., in which cases could be filed directly with the Supreme Court without first having been heard by a lower federal or state court). There were one or more federal District Courts and/or Circuit Courts in each state, territory, or other geographical region.

The Judiciary Act of 1891 created the United States Courts of Appeals and reassigned the jurisdiction of most routine appeals from the district and circuit courts to these appellate courts. The Act created nine new courts that were originally known as the "United States Circuit Courts of Appeals." The new courts had jurisdiction over most appeals of lower court decisions. The Supreme Court could review either legal issues that a court of appeals certified or decisions of court of appeals by writ of certiorari. On January 1, 1912, the effective date of the Judicial Code of 1911, the old Circuit Courts were abolished, with their remaining trial court jurisdiction transferred to the U.S. District Courts.

Bluebook citation style is used for case names, citations, and jurisdictions.

- "# Cir." = United States Court of Appeals
  - e.g., "3d Cir." = United States Court of Appeals for the Third Circuit
- "D." = United States District Court for the District of . . .
  - e.g.,"D. Mass." = United States District Court for the District of Massachusetts
- "E." = Eastern; "M." = Middle; "N." = Northern; "S." = Southern; "W." = Western
  - e.g.,"M.D. Ala." = United States District Court for the Middle District of Alabama
- "Ct. Cl." = United States Court of Claims
- The abbreviation of a state's name alone indicates the highest appellate court in that state's judiciary at the time.
  - e.g.,"Pa." = Supreme Court of Pennsylvania
  - e.g.,"Me." = Supreme Judicial Court of Maine

== List of cases in volume 266 U.S. ==
| Case Name | Page and year | Opinion of the Court | Concurring opinion(s) | Dissenting opinion(s) | Lower Court | Disposition |
|---|---|---|---|---|---|---|
| Ziang Sung Wan v. United States | 1 (1924) | Brandeis | none | none | D.C. Cir. | reversed |
| Terminal Railroad Association v. United States | 17 (1924) | Butler | none | none | E.D. Mo. | reversed |
| Love v. Griffith | 32 (1924) | Holmes | none | none | Tex. Ct. App. | affirmed |
| McCarthy v. Arndstein | 34 (1924) | Brandeis | none | none | S.D.N.Y. | reaffirmed |
| Michaelson v. United States ex rel. Chicago, St. Paul, Minneapolis and Omaha Railway Company | 42 (1924) | Sutherland | none | none | 7th Cir. | certification |
| Air-Way Electric Appliance Corporation v. Day | 71 (1924) | Butler | none | none | S.D. Ohio | reversed |
| Twin Falls Salmon River Land and Water Company v. Caldwell | 85 (1924) | VanDevanter | none | none | 9th Cir. | affirmed |
| Davis v. Henderson | 92 (1924) | Brandeis | none | none | Ark. | multiple |
| Chicago Great Western Railway Company v. Kendall | 94 (1924) | Taft | none | none | S.D. Iowa | affirmed |
| Nassau Smelting and Refining Works, Ltd. v. United States | 101 (1924) | Taft | none | none | S.D.N.Y. | affirmed |
| James Shewan and Sons, Inc. v. United States | 108 (1924) | Taft | none | none | S.D.N.Y. | reversed |
| Tod v. Waldman | 113 (1924) | Taft | none | none | 2d Cir. | reversed |
| Mellon v. Orinoco Iron Company | 121 (1924) | Taft | none | none | D.C. Cir. | affirmed |
| Avent v. United States | 127 (1924) | Holmes | none | none | S.D. Ohio | transfer to 6th Cir. |
| Mackenzie v. A. Engelhard and Sons Company | 131 (1924) | Holmes | none | none | 6th Cir. | reversed |
| B. Fernandez and Brothers v. Ayllon y Ojeda | 144 (1924) | Holmes | none | none | 1st Cir. | reversed |
| Davis v. Kennedy | 147 (1924) | Holmes | none | none | Tenn. | reversed |
| A.W. Duckett and Company v. United States | 149 (1924) | Holmes | none | none | Ct. Cl. | reversed |
| Commonwealth Trust Company of Pittsburgh v. Smith | 152 (1924) | VanDevanter | none | none | 9th Cir. | affirmed |
| Work v. United States ex rel. Lynn | 161 (1924) | VanDevanter | none | none | D.C. Cir. | reversed |
| Gonsalves v. Morse Dry Dock and Repair Company | 171 (1924) | McReynolds | none | none | E.D.N.Y. | reversed |
| Biddle v. Luvisch | 173 (1924) | McReynolds | none | none | 8th Cir. | dismissed |
| House v. Road Improvement District No. 2 of Conway County, Arkansas | 175 (1924) | McReynolds | none | none | Ark. | dismissed |
| Southern Railway Company v. City of Durham | 178 (1924) | McReynolds | none | none | N.C. | affirmed |
| Crouch v. United States | 180 (1924) | McReynolds | none | none | E.D. Va. | remanded |
| Davis v. Currie | 182 (1924) | McReynolds | none | none | S.C. | dismissed |
| Missouri Pacific Railroad Company v. Hanna | 184 (1924) | McReynolds | none | none | Ark. | dismissed |
| Erie Railroad Company v. Kirkendall | 185 (1924) | McReynolds | none | none | Ohio Dist. Ct. App. | dismissed |
| Missouri Pacific Railroad Company v. Western Crawford Road Improvement District | 187 (1924) | Brandeis | none | none | Ark. | affirmed |
| United States v. Pennsylvania Railroad Company | 191 (1924) | Brandeis | none | none | M.D. Pa. | reversed |
| Missouri ex rel. St. Louis, Brownsville and Mexico Railway Company v. Taylor | 200 (1924) | Brandeis | none | none | Mo. | affirmed |
| Panama Canal Railway Company v. Rock | 209 (1924) | Sutherland | none | Holmes | 5th Cir. | reversed |
| Savage Arms Corporation v. United States | 217 (1924) | Sutherland | none | none | Ct. Cl. | affirmed |
| Silberschein v. United States | 221 (1924) | Sutherland | none | none | E.D. Mich. | affirmed |
| Sunderland v. United States | 226 (1924) | Sutherland | none | none | 8th Cir. | affirmed |
| United States v. Moser | 236 (1924) | Sutherland | none | none | Ct. Cl. | affirmed |
| Miller v. Robertson | 243 (1924) | Butler | none | none | 2d Cir. | affirmed |
| Ferries Company v. United States | 260 (1924) | Butler | none | none | Ct. Cl. | affirmed |
| Gorham Manufacturing Company v. State Tax Commission of New York | 265 (1924) | Sanford | none | none | S.D.N.Y. | affirmed |
| Bass, Ratcliff and Gretton, Ltd. v. State Tax Commission of New York | 271 (1924) | Sanford | none | none | N.Y. Sup. Ct. | affirmed |
| Endicott Johnson Corporation v. Encyclopedia Press, Inc. | 285 (1924) | Sanford | none | none | N.Y. Sup. Ct. | affirmed |
| Endicott Johnson Corporation v. Smith | 291 (1924) | Sanford | none | none | N.Y. Sup. Ct. | affirmed |
| Sovereign Camp of Woodmen of the World v. O'Neill | 292 (1924) | Sanford | none | none | N.D. Tex. | reversed |
| Oklahoma v. Texas | 298 (1924) | VanDevanter | none | none | original | tax decree |
| United States v. Childs | 304 (1924) | McKenna | none | none | 2d Cir. | reversed |
| White v. Stump | 310 (1924) | VanDevanter | none | none | 9th Cir. | reversed |
| Davis v. O'Hara | 314 (1924) | Butler | none | none | Neb. | reversed |
| Gerdes v. Lustgarten | 321 (1924) | Sanford | none | none | 2d Cir. | reversed |
| United States v. The Barque Thekla | 328 (1924) | Holmes | none | none | 2d Cir. | certification |
| Westinghouse Electric and Manufacturing Company v. Formica Insulating Company | 342 (1924) | Taft | none | none | 6th Cir. | affirmed |
| In re East River Towing Company, Inc. | 355 (1924) | Holmes | none | none | 2d Cir. | certification |
| Campbell v. United States | 368 (1924) | Butler | none | none | S.D. Ohio | affirmed |
| National Paper and Type Company v. Bowers | 373 (1924) | McKenna | none | none | S.D.N.Y. | affirmed |
| United States v. Weissman | 377 (1924) | Holmes | none | none | D. Conn. | dismissed |
| Kansas City Southern Railway Company v. Road Improvement District No. 3 of Sevier County, Arkansas | 379 (1924) | VanDevanter | none | none | Ark. | affirmed |
| Aetna Life Insurance Company v. Dunken | 389 (1924) | Sutherland | none | none | Tex. Civ. App. | reversed |
| Davis v. Manry | 401 (1925) | McKenna | none | none | Ga. Ct. App. | reversed |
| Sanitary District of Chicago v. United States | 405 (1925) | Holmes | none | none | N.D. Ill. | injunction granted |
| The Panoil | 433 (1925) | McReynolds | none | none | E.D. La. | affirmed |
| Fullerton-Krueger Lumber Company v. Northern Pacific Railroad Company | 435 (1925) | McReynolds | none | none | Minn. | affirmed |
| Delaware and Hudson Company v. United States | 438 (1925) | McReynolds | none | none | S.D.N.Y. | affirmed |
| Robins Dry Dock and Repair Company v. Dahl | 449 (1925) | McReynolds | none | none | N.Y. Sup. Ct. | reversed |
| Behn, Meyer and Company, Ltd. v. Miller | 457 (1925) | McReynolds | none | none | D.C. Cir. | reversed |
| Compagnie Internationale de Produits Alimentaires, S.A. v. Miller | 473 (1925) | McReynolds | none | none | D.C. Cir. | reversed |
| United States v. Village of Hubbard | 474 (1925) | Brandeis | none | McReynolds | N.D. Ohio | reversed |
| Morrison v. Work | 481 (1925) | Brandeis | none | none | D.C. Cir. | affirmed |
| United States Bedding Company v. United States | 491 (1925) | Brandeis | none | none | Ct. Cl. | affirmed |
| Law v. United States | 494 (1925) | Brandeis | none | none | 9th Cir. | reversed |
| Hygrade Provision Company, Inc. v. Sherman | 497 (1925) | Sutherland | none | none | S.D.N.Y. | affirmed |
| Farmers and Mechanics National Bank of Fort Worth, Texas v. Wilkinson | 503 (1925) | Sutherland | none | none | N.D. Tex. | dismissed |
| Webster v. Fall | 507 (1925) | Sutherland | none | none | W.D. Okla. | reversed |
| Norton v. Larney | 511 (1925) | Sutherland | none | none | 8th Cir. | affirmed |
| Erie Coal and Coke Corporation v. United States | 518 (1925) | Butler | none | none | Ct. Cl. | affirmed |
| Baltimore and Ohio Railroad Company v. Groeger | 521 (1925) | Butler | none | none | 6th Cir. | reversed |
| United States v. Morrow | 531 (1925) | Sanford | none | none | Ct. Cl. | reversed |
| Kunhardt and Company, Inc. v. United States | 537 (1925) | Sanford | none | none | Ct. Cl. | affirmed |
| L. Richardson and Company, Inc. v. United States | 541 (1925) | Sanford | none | none | Ct. Cl. | affirmed |
| Ebert v. Poston | 548 (1925) | Brandeis | none | none | Mich. | reversed |
| Ozark Pipe Line Corporation v. Monier | 555 (1925) | Sutherland | none | Brandeis | W.D. Mo. | reversed |
| Michigan Public Utilities Commission v. Duke | 570 (1925) | Butler | none | none | E.D. Mich. | affirmed |
