= Ibuki Takahashi =

Japanese weightlifter (born 1997)

Personal information
- Born: 24 March 1997 (age 29)

Sport
- Country: Japan
- Sport: Weightlifting
- Weight class: 49 kg
Medal record
Women's weightlifting
Representing Japan
World Championships
Bronze medal – third place	2021 Tashkent	49 kg

Ibuki Takahashi (高橋 いぶき, Takahashi Ibuki) (born 24 March 1997) is a Japanese weightlifter. She won the bronze medal in the women's 49 kg event at the 2021 World Weightlifting Championships held in Tashkent, Uzbekistan.

== Career ==
She won the clean & jerk bronze medal in the women's 48 kg event at the 2017 Junior World Weightlifting Championships held in Tokyo, Japan. She also competed in the women's 48 kg event at the 2017 World Weightlifting Championships held in Anaheim, United States.

In 2018, she competed in the women's 48 kg event at the Asian Games held in Jakarta, Indonesia. She finished in 7th place. A few months later, she competed in the women's 49 kg event at the 2018 World Weightlifting Championships held in Ashgabat, Turkmenistan.

She also competed in the women's 49 kg event at the 2019 World Weightlifting Championships held in Pattaya, Thailand.

== Achievements ==
Year	Venue	Weight	Snatch (kg)				Clean & Jerk (kg)				Total	Rank
Year	Venue	Weight	1	2	3	Rank	1	2	3	Rank	Total	Rank
World Championships
2017	Anaheim, United States	48 kg	68	70	72	15	~~90~~	90	~~93~~	16	162	14
2018	Ashgabat, Turkmenistan	49 kg	73	76	~~78~~	16	~~96~~	96	~~100~~	14	172	16
2019	Pattaya, Thailand	49 kg	~~73~~	74	76	20	~~95~~	~~97~~	~~100~~	—	—	—
2021	Tashkent, Uzbekistan	49 kg	~~71~~	71	~~76~~	10	~~101~~	101	~~106~~	2nd place, silver medalist(s)	172	3rd place, bronze medalist(s)
2022	Bogotá, Colombia	49 kg	70	74	~~77~~	22	90	95	100	13	174	16
Asian Games
2018	Jakarta, Indonesia	48 kg	~~71~~	71	73	—N/a	95	99	~~102~~	—N/a	172	7
