= Weightlifting at the 2026 Asian Games – Women's 53 kg =

Women's 53 kg at the 2026 Asian Games
- Venue: Nagoya Trade & Industry Center
- Date: 23 September 2026
- Competitors: 13 from 13 nations

Medalists
gold medal	Kang Hyon-gyong	North Korea
silver medal	Zhao Jinlan	China
bronze medal	Surodchana Khambao	Thailand

The women's 53 kilograms competition at the 2026 Asian Games was held on 23 September 2026 at the Nagoya Trade & Industry Center.

== Schedule ==
All times are Japan Standard Time (UTC+09:00)

Date	Time	Event
Wednesday, 23 September 2026	10:00	Group B
Wednesday, 23 September 2026	17:00	Group A

== Records ==
Prior to this competition, the existing world, Asian and Games records were as follows.

World Record	Snatch	World Standard	99 kg	—	1 June 2025
World Record	Clean & Jerk	World Standard	126 kg	—	1 June 2025
World Record	Total	World Standard	223 kg	—	1 June 2025
Asian Record	Snatch	Asian Standard	99 kg	—	1 June 2025
Asian Record	Clean & Jerk	Asian Standard	126 kg	—	1 June 2025
Asian Record	Total	Asian Standard	223 kg	—	1 June 2025
Games Record	Snatch	Asian Games Standard	96 kg	—	1 August 2026
Games Record	Clean & Jerk	Asian Games Standard	122 kg	—	1 August 2026
Games Record	Total	Asian Games Standard	217 kg	—	1 August 2026

== Results ==
Rank	Athlete	Group	Snatch (kg)				Clean & Jerk (kg)				Total
Rank	Athlete	Group	1	2	3	Result	1	2	3	Result	Total
1st place, gold medalist(s)	Kang Hyon-gyong (PRK)	A	94	97	99	99	118	122	124	124	223
2nd place, silver medalist(s)	Zhao Jinlan (CHN)	A	94	~~97~~	~~97~~	94	118	~~123~~	124	124	218
3rd place, bronze medalist(s)	Surodchana Khambao (THA)	A	90	93	95	95	115	119	~~127~~	119	214
4	Rosegie Ramos (PHI)	A	88	91	93	93	105	110	~~113~~	110	203
5	Nigora Abdullaeva (UZB)	A	86	89	91	91	107	110	~~113~~	110	201
6	Lin Cheng-jing (TPE)	A	85	~~88~~	88	88	110	~~114~~	~~114~~	110	198
7	Nozomi Abe (JPN)	A	83	86	88	88	100	104	108	108	196
8	Gyaneshwari Yadav (IND)	A	84	87	~~90~~	87	~~105~~	105	108	108	195
9	Ogulşat Amanowa (TKM)	A	85	88	~~90~~	88	~~101~~	103	~~107~~	103	191
10	Juliana Klarisa (INA)	B	78	~~80~~	80	80	100	~~104~~	104	104	184
11	Nguyễn Hoài Hương (VIE)	A	82	~~85~~	~~85~~	82	95	~~103~~	~~103~~	95	177
12	Marjia Akter Ekra (BAN)	B	68	71	74	74	87	90	~~92~~	90	164
13	Zahra Al-Hashmi (UAE)	B	45	50	~~52~~	50	60	~~65~~	65	65	115

== New records ==
The following records were established during the competition.

Snatch	97	Kang Hyon-gyong (PRK)	GR
Snatch	99	Kang Hyon-gyong (PRK)	GR
Clean & Jerk	124	Kang Hyon-gyong (PRK)	GR
Total	221	Kang Hyon-gyong (PRK)	GR
Total	223	Kang Hyon-gyong (PRK)	GR
