= 2024 World Weightlifting Championships – Women's 55 kg =

Women's 55 kg at the 2024 World Weightlifting Championships
- Venue: Weightlifting Marquee Venue
- Location: Manama, Bahrain
- Dates: 8 December
- Competitors: 31 from 26 nations
- Winning total: 226 kg

Medalists
gold medal	Kang Hyon-gyong	North Korea
silver medal	Chen Guan-ling	Chinese Taipei
bronze medal	Aleksandra Grigoryan	Armenia

The women's 55 kilograms competition at the 2024 World Weightlifting Championships was held on 8 December 2024.

== Schedule ==
Date	Time	Event
8 December 2024	10:00	Group C
8 December 2024	15:00	Group B
8 December 2024	20:00	Group A

== Records ==
Prior to this competition, the existing world records were as follows.

World Record	Snatch	Kang Hyon-gyong (PRK)	104 kg	Tashkent, Uzbekistan	2 October 2023
World Record	Clean & Jerk	Kang Hyon-gyong (PRK)	131 kg	Phuket, Thailand	2 April 2024
World Record	Total	Kang Hyon-gyong (PRK)	234 kg	Phuket, Thailand	2 April 2024

== Results ==
Rank	Athlete	Group	Snatch (kg)				Clean & Jerk (kg)				Total
Rank	Athlete	Group	1	2	3	Rank	1	2	3	Rank	Total
1st place, gold medalist(s)	Kang Hyon-gyong (PRK)	A	96	100	~~102~~	1st place, gold medalist(s)	121	126	~~132~~	1st place, gold medalist(s)	226
2nd place, silver medalist(s)	Chen Guan-ling (TPE)	A	90	93	~~98~~	3rd place, bronze medalist(s)	113	~~118~~	118	3rd place, bronze medalist(s)	211
3rd place, bronze medalist(s)	Aleksandra Grigoryan (ARM)	A	85	~~90~~	~~91~~	12	117	~~120~~	120; WJR	2nd place, silver medalist(s)	205
4	Garance Rigaud (FRA)	A	88	91	~~94~~	4	~~105~~	106	110	8	201
5	Onome Didih (NGR)	B	90	~~95~~	~~95~~	5	~~110~~	110	~~115~~	7	200
6	Olha Ivzhenko (UKR)	A	87	89	~~91~~	6	103	105	107	12	196
7	Rohelys Galvis (COL)	A	88	~~92~~	~~92~~	7	108	~~111~~	—	9	196
8	Antonina Moya (COL)	A	85	~~88~~	~~90~~	13	108	111	~~114~~	4	196
9	Bindyarani Devi (IND)	B	~~85~~	85	~~88~~	11	110	~~114~~	~~116~~	5	195
10	Sei Higa (JPN)	A	~~87~~	87	~~90~~	9	100	104	108	10	195
11	Josée Gallant (CAN)	B	~~86~~	87	~~90~~	8	105	~~110~~	~~110~~	14	192
12	Hu Chia-chi (TPE)	B	~~80~~	80	~~84~~	19	105	110	~~114~~	6	190
13	Asia González (PUR)	C	78	80	83	14	100	~~105~~	105	13	188
14	Aline Facciolla (WRT)	B	80	83	86	10	101	~~105~~	~~105~~	19	187
15	Rebekka Tao Jacobsen (NOR)	B	77	79	80	20	102	105	107	11	187
16	Alba Sánchez (ESP)	B	~~81~~	81	~~83~~	16	102	~~104~~	~~104~~	17	183
17	Sol Anette Waaler (NOR)	B	~~81~~	81	~~84~~	15	~~102~~	102	~~105~~	18	183
18	Kim Ga-young (KOR)	B	78	~~81~~	~~81~~	22	~~105~~	105	~~109~~	16	183
19	Juliana Klarisa (INA)	B	76	79	~~81~~	21	100	~~104~~	~~104~~	20	179
20	Elena Tzatzollari (GRE)	C	73	77	~~81~~	23	93	96	~~100~~	22	173
21	Brenna Kean (AUS)	C	~~74~~	~~74~~	74	25	98	~~103~~	~~103~~	21	172
22	Marjia Akter Ekra (BAN)	C	70	74	~~77~~	24	90	95	~~97~~	23	169
23	Kim Camilleri Lagana (MLT)	C	65	68	70	26	86	90	~~93~~	24	160
24	Diana Brogaard (DEN)	C	66	69	~~71~~	27	86	89	~~91~~	25	158
25	Jurelena binti Juna (BRU)	C	65	~~68~~	68	28	83	87	~~90~~	26	155
26	Margarida Pontes (POR)	C	58	~~65~~	~~66~~	29	~~80~~	80	~~86~~	27	138
—	Zhang Haiqin (CHN)	A	93	97	~~101~~	2nd place, silver medalist(s)	~~122~~	~~122~~	~~122~~	—	—
—	Shoely Mego (PER)	A	78	81	~~83~~	17	~~103~~	~~103~~	~~103~~	—	—
—	Maud Chiaulon (FRA)	B	78	80	~~82~~	18	~~95~~	~~95~~	~~95~~	—	—
—	Rose Harvey (CAN)	B	~~80~~	~~80~~	~~80~~	—	105	~~108~~	~~109~~	15	—
—	Liyana Safiah Sidek (BRU)	C	—	—	—	—	—	—	—	—	—
—	Winnifred Ntumi (GHA)	C	Did not start								
