= Kang Hyon-gyong =

North Korean weightlifter (born 1999)

Personal information
- Born: February 16, 1999 (age 27) North Korea
- Weight: 55 kg (121 lb)

Sport
- Country: North Korea
- Sport: Weightlifting

Achievements and titles
- Personal bests: Snatch: 104 kg (2022, CWR); Clean & Jerk: 131 kg (2024, CWR); Total: 234 kg (2024, CWR)
Medal record
Women's weightlifting
Representing North Korea
World Championships
Gold medal – first place	2024 Manama	55 kg
Gold medal – first place	2025 Førde	53 kg
Asian Championships
Gold medal – first place	2024 Tashkent	55 kg
Asian Games
Gold medal – first place	2022 Hangzhou	55 kg
Gold medal – first place	2026 Aichi-Nagoya	53 kg
World Cup
Gold medal – first place	2024 Phuket	55 kg

Korean name
- Hangul: 강현경
- RR: Gang Hyeongyeong
- MR: Kang Hyŏn'gyŏng

Kang Hyon-gyong (Korean: 강현경; born 16 February 1999) is a North Korean female weightlifter competing in the women's 55 kg category. She won the gold medal in the women's 55 kg event at the 2024 World Weightlifting Championships held in Manama, Bahrain, a gold medal in the 55kg event at the 2022 Asian Games held in Hangzhou, China. and a gold medal in the women's 55 kg event at the 2024 Asian Weightlifting Championships held in Tashkent, Uzbekistan.

Kang is the current record holder at Snatch, Clean & Jerk and Total at the 59 kg category with a total of 234 kg.

== Achievements ==
Year	Venue	Weight	Snatch (kg)				Clean & jerk (kg)				Total	Rank
Year	Venue	Weight	1	2	3	Rank	1	2	3	Rank	Total	Rank
World Championships
2024	Manama, Bahrain	55 kg	96	100	~~102~~	1st place, gold medalist(s)	121	126	~~132~~	1st place, gold medalist(s)	226	1st place, gold medalist(s)
2025	Førde, Norway	53 kg	~~93~~	93	~~96~~	2nd place, silver medalist(s)	116	121	~~127~~	1st place, gold medalist(s)	214	1st place, gold medalist(s)
Asian Games
2023	Hangzhou, China	55 kg	96	100	103	1	120	125	130	1	233	1st place, gold medalist(s)
2026	Nagoya, Japan	53 kg	94	97	99	1	118	122	124	1	223	1st place, gold medalist(s)
Asian Championships
2024	Tashkent, Uzbekistan	55 kg	90	98	104 CWR	1st place, gold medalist(s)	115	123	~~130~~	1st place, gold medalist(s)	227	1st place, gold medalist(s)
