= 2021 World Weightlifting Championships – Women's 49 kg =

Weightlifting Championship

The women's 49 kilograms competition at the 2021 World Weightlifting Championships was held on 8 December 2021.

== Schedule ==
Date	Time	Event
8 December 2021	13:00	Group B
8 December 2021	19:00	Group A

== Medalists ==
Event	Gold		Silver		Bronze	
Snatch	Surodchana Khambao (THA)	86 kg	Rira Suzuki (JPN)	78 kg	Ýulduz Jumabaýewa (TKM)	76 kg
Clean & Jerk	Surodchana Khambao (THA)	105 kg	Ibuki Takahashi (JPN)	101 kg	Rira Suzuki (JPN)	101 kg
Total	Surodchana Khambao (THA)	191 kg	Rira Suzuki (JPN)	179 kg	Ibuki Takahashi (JPN)	172 kg

== Records ==
Prior to this competition, the existing world records were as follows.

World Record	Snatch	Hou Zhihui (CHN)	96 kg	Tashkent, Uzbekistan	17 April 2021
World Record	Clean & Jerk	Mirabai Chanu (IND)	119 kg	Tashkent, Uzbekistan	17 April 2021
World Record	Total	Hou Zhihui (CHN)	213 kg	Tashkent, Uzbekistan	17 April 2021

== Results ==
Rank	Athlete	Group	Snatch (kg)				Clean & Jerk (kg)				Total
Rank	Athlete	Group	1	2	3	Rank	1	2	3	Rank	Total
1st place, gold medalist(s)	Surodchana Khambao (THA)	A	82	84	86	1st place, gold medalist(s)	103	105	~~110~~	1st place, gold medalist(s)	191
2nd place, silver medalist(s)	Rira Suzuki (JPN)	A	78	~~81~~	~~81~~	2nd place, silver medalist(s)	~~101~~	101	~~104~~	3rd place, bronze medalist(s)	179
3rd place, bronze medalist(s)	Ibuki Takahashi (JPN)	A	~~71~~	71	~~76~~	10	~~101~~	101	~~106~~	2nd place, silver medalist(s)	172
4	Siti Nafisatul Hariroh (INA)	A	72	~~75~~	75	4	92	95	~~97~~	5	170
5	Stella Kingsley (NGR)	A	68	72	~~74~~	9	88	94	96	4	168
6	Jhilli Dalabehera (IND)	A	~~73~~	~~73~~	73	8	91	94	~~97~~	6	167
7	Bägül Berdiýewa (TKM)	A	~~74~~	74	~~77~~	5	92	~~95~~	~~95~~	8	166
8	Elien Perez (PHI)	A	~~73~~	73	~~77~~	7	93	~~95~~	~~95~~	7	166
9	María Giménez-Guervós (ESP)	A	70	73	~~75~~	6	90	~~94~~	~~94~~	9	163
10	Zukhra Otojonova (UZB)	A	63	~~66~~	66	11	80	84	~~86~~	10	150
11	Winnifred Ntumi (GHA)	B	56	59	~~61~~	12	73	74	76	11	135
12	Janet Oduor (KEN)	B	40	45	~~50~~	13	50	~~55~~	58	12	103
—	Ýulduz Jumabaýewa (TKM)	A	~~76~~	76	~~79~~	3rd place, bronze medalist(s)	~~100~~	~~100~~	~~101~~	—	—
