= Homayoun Teymouri =

Iranian weightlifter (born 1994)

Personal information
- Born: 11 August 1994 (age 31)

Sport
- Country: Iran
- Sport: Weightlifting
Medal record
Men's weightlifting
Representing Iran
Islamic Solidarity Games
Silver medal – second place	2017 Baku	+105 kg
Asian Indoor and Martial Arts Games
Bronze medal – third place	2017 Ashgabat	+105 kg
Qatar Cup
Bronze medal – third place	2018 Doha	+109 kg

Homayoun Teymouri (born 11 August 1994) is an Iranian weightlifter. In 2017, at the Islamic Solidarity Games held in Baku, Azerbaijan, he won the silver medal in the men's +105 kg event. At the 2017 Asian Indoor and Martial Arts Games held in Ashgabat, Turkmenistan he won the bronze medal in the men's +105 kg event.
