= 2025 World Weightlifting Championships – Women's 53 kg =

Women's 53 kg at the 2025 World Weightlifting Championships
- Venue: Førdehuset
- Location: Førde, Norway
- Dates: 2 and 3 October
- Winning total: 214 kg

Medalists
gold medal	Kang Hyon-gyong	North Korea
silver medal	Mihaela Cambei	Romania
bronze medal	Surodchana Khambao	Thailand

The women's 53 kilograms competition at the 2025 World Weightlifting Championships was held on 2 and 3 October 2025.

== Schedule ==
Date	Time	Event
2 October 2025	11:00	Group C
3 October 2025	15:00	Group B
3 October 2025	17:00	Group A

== Records ==
Prior to this competition, the existing world records were as follows.

World record	Snatch	World Standard	99 kg	—	1 June 2025
World record	Clean & Jerk	World Standard	126 kg	—	1 June 2025
World record	Total	World Standard	223 kg	—	1 June 2025

== Results ==
Rank	Athlete	Group	Snatch (kg)				Clean & Jerk (kg)				Total
Rank	Athlete	Group	1	2	3	Rank	1	2	3	Rank	Total
1st place, gold medalist(s)	Kang Hyon-gyong (PRK)	A	~~93~~	93	~~96~~	2nd place, silver medalist(s)	116	121	~~127~~	1st place, gold medalist(s)	214
2nd place, silver medalist(s)	Mihaela Cambei (ROU)	A	90	~~93~~	94; ER	1st place, gold medalist(s)	108	111	114	2nd place, silver medalist(s)	208; ER
3rd place, bronze medalist(s)	Surodchana Khambao (THA)	A	88	~~90~~	90	5	110	~~112~~	~~112~~	4	200
4	Cansel Özkan (TUR)	A	89	~~91~~	93	3rd place, bronze medalist(s)	~~104~~	104	~~106~~	7	197
5	Natasha Rosa Figueiredo (BRA)	B	~~84~~	84	~~88~~	6	108	~~112~~	~~112~~	5	192
6	Shoely Mego (PER)	A	80	~~83~~	83	9	~~103~~	103	~~106~~	9	186
7	Malen Monasterio (ESP)	C	80	83	~~86~~	7	98	102	~~105~~	10	185
8	Andrea de la Herrán (MEX)	B	80	83	~~86~~	8	98	101	~~103~~	14	184
9	Juliana Klarisa (INA)	B	77	80	~~82~~	10	100	103	~~105~~	8	183
10	Mio Nishiura (JPN)	B	78	~~80~~	80	12	98	~~101~~	101	15	181
11	Basilia Bamerop Ninggan (INA)	B	77	80	~~82~~	11	~~100~~	~~101~~	101	16	181
12	Rebekka Tao Jacobsen (NOR)	B	76	~~78~~	78	15	101	~~104~~	~~104~~	11	179
13	Iris Bel (FRA)	B	75	78	~~80~~	13	98	101	~~104~~	12	179
14	Sol Anette Waaler (NOR)	B	~~78~~	78	~~81~~	14	98	101	~~104~~	13	179
15	Kristina Novitskaia (AIN)	C	75	~~78~~	~~78~~	17	93	96	~~100~~	17	171
16	Cosmina Adriana Pană (ROU)	C	73	~~75~~	76	16	93	~~95~~	~~95~~	19	169
17	Radamila Zagorac (SRB)	C	~~70~~	70	~~74~~	19	90	94	~~97~~	18	164
18	Diana Brogaard (DEN)	C	~~70~~	70	72	18	88	~~90~~	~~92~~	20	160
19	Amal Al-Shareefi (KUW)	C	~~50~~	50	54	20	~~72~~	72	~~80~~	21	126
20	Zahra Al-Hashmi (UAE)	C	48	50	~~52~~	21	62	~~65~~	65	22	115
—	Chen Guan-ling (TPE)	A	~~89~~	~~90~~	~~90~~	—	~~110~~	110	113	3rd place, bronze medalist(s)	—
—	Sei Higa (JPN)	A	~~88~~	~~88~~	~~88~~	—	~~103~~	103	105	6	—
—	Du Meiyuan (CHN)	A	89	92	~~94~~	4	—	—	—	—	—
X	Olivia Bloodworth (CWF)	C	68	~~71~~	71	X	~~88~~	~~88~~	~~88~~	X	—
X	Noorin Gulam (CWF)	C	71	73	~~75~~	X	90	93	~~95~~	X	166
