= Oh Kwang-ok =

North Korean weightlifter (born 2002)

Personal information
- Born: 2 January 2002 (age 24)

Sport
- Country: North Korea
- Sport: Weightlifting
- Weight class: 57 kg
Medal record
Women's weightlifting
Representing North Korea
World Championships
Gold medal – first place	2026 Ningbo	57 kg
Asian Games
Gold medal – first place	2026 Aichi–Nagoya	57 kg

Oh Kwang-ok (Korean: 오광옥; born 2 January 2002) is a North Korean weightlifter. She is a 2026 World Weightlifting Championships gold medalist and world record holder.

== Career ==
In September 2026, Oh competed at the 2026 Asian Games and won a gold medal in the 57 kg category. She opened the event with 104 kg in the snatch. She followed it up with 134 kg in the clean and jerk, before finishing with a total lift of 238 kg. She set world records, Asian records, and Asian Games records in the snatch, clean and jerk and total. The next month she competed at the 2026 World Weightlifting Championships and won a gold medal in the 57 kg category. She opened the event with 102 kg in the snatch. She followed it up with 125 kg in the clean and jerk, before finishing with a total lift of 227 kg.
