= Ziang Sung Wan v. United States =

- Supreme Court of the United States

Argued April 7–8, 1924 Decided October 13, 1924
- Full case name: Ziang Sung Wan v. United States
- Citations: 266 U.S. 1 (more) 45 S. Ct. 1; 69 L. Ed. 131

Holding
- Confessions must be factually voluntary. Compelled confessions are inadmissible in court.

Court membership
- Chief Justice William H. Taft Associate Justices Joseph McKenna · Oliver W. Holmes Jr. Willis Van Devanter · James C. McReynolds; Louis Brandeis · George Sutherland; Pierce Butler · Edward T. Sanford

Case opinion
- Majority: Brandeis, joined by unanimous court

Ziang Sung Wan v. United States, 266 U.S. 1 (1924), was a United States Supreme Court case concerning the admissibility of a confession in a 1919 triple homicide case. Scott Seligman, writing for the Smithsonian, referred to the case as having "laid the groundwork for Americans' right to remain silent".

One of the victims of the triple murder was translator Theodore Wong.
