= Weightlifting at the 2026 Asian Games – Women's 57 kg =

Women's 57 kg at the 2026 Asian Games
- Venue: Nagoya Trade & Industry Center
- Date: 25 September 2026
- Competitors: 8 from 8 nations

Medalists
gold medal	Oh Kwang-ok	North Korea
silver medal	Suratwadee Yodsarn	Thailand
bronze medal	Chen Guan-ling	Chinese Taipei

The women's 57 kilograms competition at the 2026 Asian Games was held on 25 September 2026 at the Nagoya Trade & Industry Center.

== Schedule ==
All times are Japan Standard Time (UTC+09:00)

Date	Time	Event
Friday, 25 September 2026	13:30	Group A

== Records ==
Prior to this competition, the existing world, Asian and Games records were as follows.

World Record	Snatch	World Standard	102 kg	—	1 August 2026
World Record	Clean & Jerk	World Standard	131 kg	—	1 August 2026
World Record	Total	World Standard	231 kg	—	1 August 2026
Asian Record	Snatch	Asian Standard	102 kg	—	1 August 2026
Asian Record	Clean & Jerk	Asian Standard	130 kg	—	1 August 2026
Asian Record	Total	Asian Standard	231 kg	—	1 August 2026
Games Record	Snatch	Asian Games Standard	101 kg	—	1 August 2026
Games Record	Clean & Jerk	Asian Games Standard	127 kg	—	1 August 2026
Games Record	Total	Asian Games Standard	227 kg	—	1 August 2026

== Results ==
Legend

- NM — No mark

Rank	Athlete	Group	Snatch (kg)				Clean & Jerk (kg)				Total
Rank	Athlete	Group	1	2	3	Result	1	2	3	Result	Total
1st place, gold medalist(s)	Oh Kwang-ok (PRK)	A	98	102	104	104	125	132	134	134	238
2nd place, silver medalist(s)	Suratwadee Yodsarn (THA)	A	92	95	97	97	122	—	—	122	219
3rd place, bronze medalist(s)	Chen Guan-ling (TPE)	A	92	95	~~97~~	95	~~118~~	120	122	122	217
4	Quàng Thị Tâm (VIE)	A	92	95	~~97~~	95	116	~~121~~	121	121	216
5	Yekaterina Alyakina (KAZ)	A	85	90	~~93~~	90	105	~~110~~	~~110~~	105	195
6	Srity Akter (BAN)	A	72	74	75	75	95	~~100~~	100	100	175
7	Bashayer Al-Ahbabi (UAE)	A	47	50	~~55~~	50	55	60	~~65~~	60	110
—	Ester Alves (TLS)	A	~~45~~	~~45~~	~~45~~	—	—	—	—	—	NM

== New records ==
The following records were established during the competition.

Snatch	102	Oh Kwang-ok (PRK)	GR
Snatch	104	Oh Kwang-ok (PRK)	WR
Clean & Jerk	132	Oh Kwang-ok (PRK)	WR
Clean & Jerk	134	Oh Kwang-ok (PRK)	WR
Total	229	Oh Kwang-ok (PRK)	GR
Total	236	Oh Kwang-ok (PRK)	WR
Total	238	Oh Kwang-ok (PRK)	WR
