= Yulduz Jumabayeva =

Turkmenistan weightlifter (born 1998)

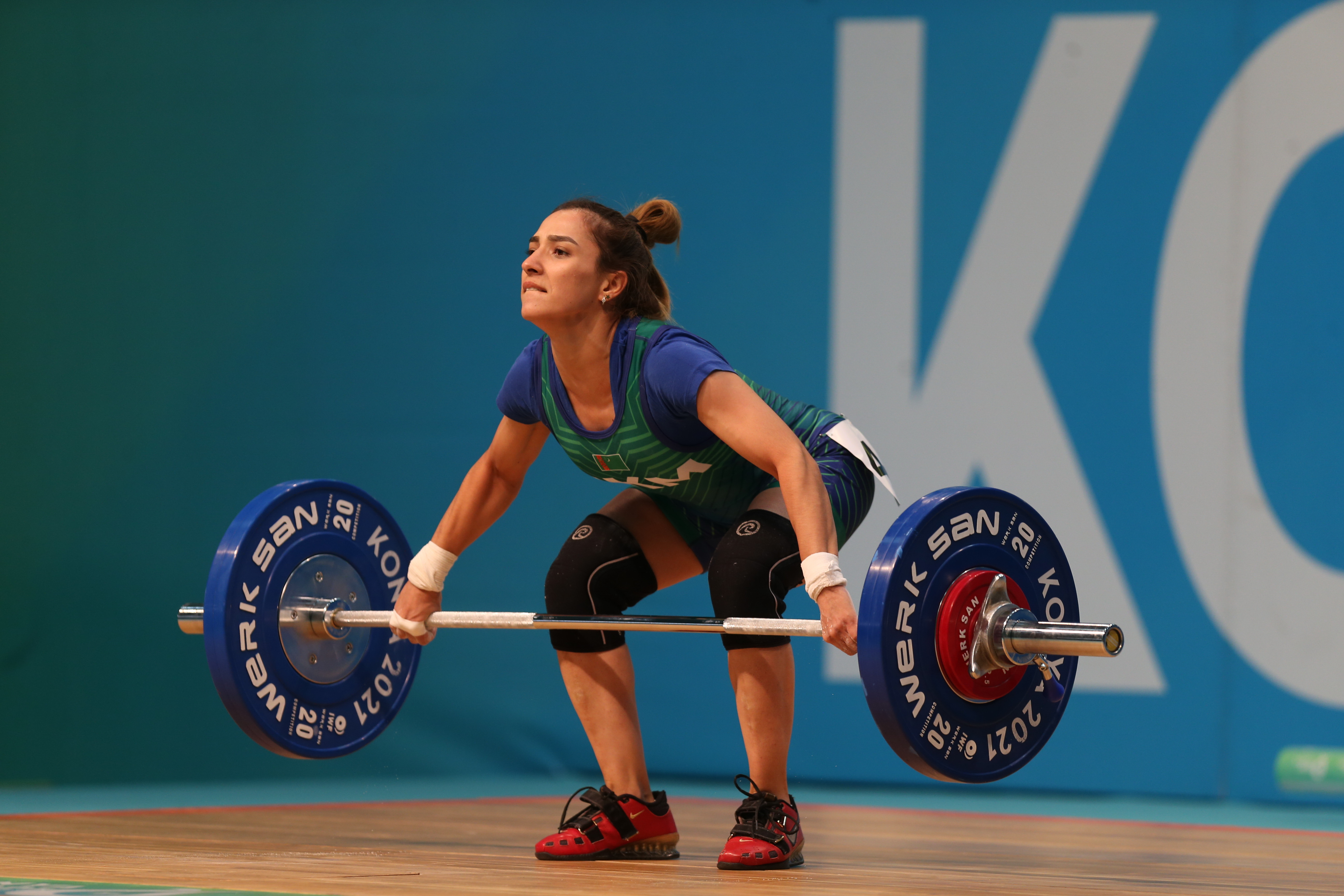

Personal information
- Nationality: Turkmenistan
- Born: 22 April 1998 (age 28)
- Weight: 44.90 kg (99 lb)

Sport
- Country: Turkmenistan
- Sport: Weightlifting
- Event: –45 kg
Medal record
World Championships
Gold medal – first place	2018 Ashgabat	–45 kg
Bronze medal – third place	2021 Tashkent	–45 kg S
Asian Championships
Bronze medal – third place	2017 Ashgabat	–48 kg
Bronze medal – third place	2022 Manama	–49 kg
Islamic Solidarity Games
Bronze medal – third place	2021 Konya	–49 kg

Yulduz Jumabyeva (born 22 April 1998) is a Turkmenistan weightlifter.

She participated at the 2018 World Weightlifting Championships, winning a medal.

== Major results ==
Year	Venue	Weight	Snatch (kg)				Clean & Jerk (kg)				Total	Rank
Year	Venue	Weight	1	2	3	Rank	1	2	3	Rank	Total	Rank
Representing Turkmenistan
World Championships
2021	Tashkent, Uzbekistan	49 kg	~~76~~	76	~~79~~	3rd place, bronze medalist(s)	~~100~~	~~100~~	~~101~~	—	—	—
2019	Pattaya, Thailand	49 kg	~~78~~	~~78~~	~~78~~	—	—	—	—	—	—	—
2018	Ashgabat, Turkmenistan	45 kg	75	~~79~~	~~79~~	2nd place, silver medalist(s)	94	104	~~107~~	1st place, gold medalist(s)	179	1st place, gold medalist(s)
2017	Anaheim, United States	48 kg	~~78~~	~~78~~	~~78~~	—	95	~~100~~	~~104~~	9	—	—
Asian Championships
2019	Ningbo, China	49 kg	73	77	~~80~~	8	97	101	~~104~~	6	178	6
2017	Ashgabat, Turkmenistan	48 kg	65	70	72	4	87	~~90~~	93	3rd place, bronze medalist(s)	165	3rd place, bronze medalist(s)
2016	Tashkent, Uzbekistan	48 kg	65	68	71	12	83	88	92	12	163	12
Islamic Solidarity Games
2017	Baku, Azerbaijan	48 kg	67	~~71~~	71	5	88	92	~~94~~	3	163	4
