= 2018 World Weightlifting Championships – Women's 45 kg =

The women's 45 kg competition at the 2018 World Weightlifting Championships was held on 2 November 2018.

== Schedule ==
Date	Time	Event
2 November 2018	17:25	Group A

== Medalists ==
Event	Gold		Silver		Bronze	
Snatch	Chiraphan Nanthawong (THA)	76 kg	Ýulduz Jumabaýewa (TKM)	75 kg	Alessandra Pagliaro (ITA)	70 kg
Clean & Jerk	Ýulduz Jumabaýewa (TKM)	104 kg	Chiraphan Nanthawong (THA)	95 kg	Katherin Echandía (VEN)	90 kg
Total	Ýulduz Jumabaýewa (TKM)	179 kg	Chiraphan Nanthawong (THA)	171 kg	Katherin Echandía (VEN)	157 kg

== Records ==
Prior to this competition, the existing world records were as follows.

World Record	Snatch	World Standard	85 kg	—	1 November 2018
World Record	Clean & Jerk	World Standard	108 kg	—	1 November 2018
World Record	Total	World Standard	191 kg	—	1 November 2018

== Results ==
Rank	Athlete	Group	Snatch (kg)				Clean & Jerk (kg)				Total
Rank	Athlete	Group	1	2	3	Rank	1	2	3	Rank	Total
1st place, gold medalist(s)	Ýulduz Jumabaýewa (TKM)	A	75	~~79~~	~~79~~	2nd place, silver medalist(s)	94	104	~~107~~	1st place, gold medalist(s)	179
2nd place, silver medalist(s)	Chiraphan Nanthawong (THA)	A	76	~~79~~	~~79~~	1st place, gold medalist(s)	95	~~100~~	~~104~~	2nd place, silver medalist(s)	171
3rd place, bronze medalist(s)	Katherin Echandía (VEN)	A	67	~~71~~	~~71~~	5	86	90	~~93~~	3rd place, bronze medalist(s)	157
4	Alessandra Pagliaro (ITA)	A	70	~~72~~	~~72~~	3rd place, bronze medalist(s)	82	84	86	4	156
5	Nguyễn Thị Thu Trang (VIE)	A	70	~~73~~	~~73~~	4	78	81	~~83~~	6	151
6	Daniela Pandova (BUL)	A	~~55~~	55	60	6	75	81	~~86~~	5	141
DQ	Thunya Sukcharoen (THA)	A	77	80	~~82~~	—	96	100	106	—	—
