= Weightlifting at the 2017 Islamic Solidarity Games =

- Venue: Azerbaijan Weightlifting Academy
- Dates: 13–17 May 2017

Weightlifting at the 2017 Islamic Solidarity Games was held in Azerbaijan Weightlifting Academy, Baku from 13 to 17 May 2017.

== Medal table ==
* Host nation (Azerbaijan)

Rank	Nation	Gold	Silver	Bronze	Total
1	Egypt	4	1	0	5
2	Indonesia	3	4	0	7
3	Turkey	3	2	2	7
4	Iran	2	2	1	5
5	Uzbekistan	1	3	5	9
6	Iraq	1	2	0	3
7	Turkmenistan	1	1	0	2
8	Azerbaijan*	1	0	3	4
9	Cameroon	0	1	1	2
10	Saudi Arabia	0	0	2	2
10	Tunisia	0	0	2	2
Totals (11 entries)		16	16	16	48

== Medalists ==
=== Men ===
Event	Gold	Silver	Bronze
56 kg	Surahmat Wijoyo; Indonesia	Muhammad Purkon; Indonesia	Amine Bouhijbha; Tunisia
62 kg	Eko Yuli Irawan; Indonesia	Ahmed Saad; Egypt	Faisal Al-Sulami; Saudi Arabia
69 kg	Daniyar İsmayilov; Turkey	Majid Askari; Iran	Doston Yokubov; Uzbekistan
77 kg	Mohamed Ehab; Egypt	Ahmed Farooq; Iraq	Celil Erdoğdu; Turkey
85 kg	Safaa Rashed; Iraq	Ulugbek Alimov; Uzbekistan	Khalil Al-Hamqan; Saudi Arabia
94 kg	Ayoub Mousavi; Iran	Farkhodbek Sobirov; Uzbekistan	Rovshan Fatullayev; Azerbaijan
105 kg	Mohammad Reza Barari; Iran	Salwan Jasim; Iraq	Ivan Efremov; Uzbekistan
+105 kg	Rustam Djangabaev; Uzbekistan	Homayoun Teymouri; Iran	Ramin Rabieifar; Iran

=== Women ===
Event	Gold	Silver	Bronze
48 kg	Sri Wahyuni Agustiani; Indonesia	Şaziye Erdoğan; Turkey	Gamze Karakol; Turkey
53 kg	Bediha Tunadağı; Turkey	Dewi Safitri; Indonesia	Sabina Azimova; Azerbaijan
58 kg	Sümeyye Kentli; Turkey	Acchedya Jagaddhita; Indonesia	Muattar Nabieva; Uzbekistan
63 kg	Polina Gurýewa; Turkmenistan	Kumushkhon Fayzullaeva; Uzbekistan	Elnura Abbasova; Azerbaijan
69 kg	~~Anastassiya Ibrahimli~~; ~~Azerbaijan~~	Gülnabat Kadyrowa; Turkmenistan	Manzurakhon Mamasalieva; Uzbekistan
75 kg	Rawia Hassan; Egypt	Rabia Kaya; Turkey	Omadoy Otakuziyeva; Uzbekistan
90 kg	Dina Ahmed; Egypt	Clémentine Meukeugni; Cameroon	Albertine Um; Cameroon
+90 kg	Shaimaa Khalaf; Egypt	Nurul Akmal; Indonesia	Marwa Jlassi; Tunisia
