= Chen Guan-ling =

Taiwanese weightlifter (born 2005)

Personal information
- Native name: 陳冠伶
- Born: 29 January 2005 (age 21) Taiwan

Sport
- Sport: Weightlifting
- Weight class: 55 kg
Medal record
Women's weightlifting
Representing Chinese Taipei
World Championships
Gold medal – first place	2023 Riyadh	55 kg
Silver medal – second place	2024 Manama	55 kg
Silver medal – second place	2026 Ningbo	57 kg
Asian Games
Bronze medal – third place	2026 Aichi–Nagoya	57 kg
Asian Championships
Silver medal – second place	2024 Tashkent	55 kg
Silver medal – second place	2025 Jiangshan	55 kg
World Junior Championships
Gold medal – first place	2024 León	55 kg
Asian Junior Championships
Gold medal – first place	2024 Doha	55 kg

Chen Guan-ling (Chinese: 陳冠伶; born 29 January 2005) is a weightlifter from Taiwan.

== Career ==
Chen Guan-ling is Asian champion in May 2023, then Asian junior championships in July 2023 in the -55 kg category. A month later, at the age of 18, she became world champion at 2023 World Weightlifting Championships in Riyadh with a total of 203 kg (91 kg in the snatch / 112 kg in the clean and jerk).
