= Theodore Wong =

Chinese translator (1876 – 1919)

- Traditional Chinese: 黃鼎
- Simplified Chinese: 黄鼎
Transcriptions
Standard Mandarin
- Hanyu Pinyin: Huáng Dǐng
- Wade–Giles: Huang2 Ting3

Zuoting (courtesy name)
- Chinese: 佐廷
Transcriptions
Standard Mandarin
- Hanyu Pinyin: Zuǒtíng
- Wade–Giles: Tso3-ting2

Theodore Ting Wong (June 26, 1876 – January 29, 1919) a.k.a. Huang Ding (Chinese: 黄鼎), courtesy name Zuoting (Chinese: 佐廷) or Tso-tsing, was a Chinese translator and scholar.

Theodore Wong's father, Kong Chai Wong (黃光彩; 黄光彩; Huáng Guāngcǎi), originated from Xiamen, Fujian, while Theodore Wong himself was born in Shanghai; Kong Chai began living in Shanghai in 1845. He attended St. John's College in Shanghai, then Episcopal High School in 1892–1894, and then University of Virginia in 1894–1896 as the first Chinese student. He did not receive a degree from UVA; at the time the majority of students studied to get certifications instead of bachelor's degrees. He returned to China in January 1897 and began teaching courses at St. John's. He and Yan Huiqing (W. W. Yen) cofounded the Shanghai YMCA. Theodore Wong married Julia Sih (Xue Pa, 薛葩) in 1898. They had four children who survived to adulthood, all female, while one daughter and two sons died before adulthood.

He joined the Shansi University Translation Department, and he, with Zhang Zaixin (張在新; 张在新; Zhāng Zàixīn), translated 23 books. Theodore Wong and Zhang Zaixin translated six Sherlock Holmes works in 1901. Theodore Wong rendered Holmes's name as 福而摩司, which would be read as Fú'érmósī in Modern Standard Mandarin. Subsequent publishers began rendering Holmes's name differently, as 福爾摩斯 in Traditional Chinese, which would be 福尔摩斯 in Simplified Chinese and Fú'ěrmósī in Modern Standard Mandarin; this version became the common way of rendering "Holmes" in Chinese languages.

Theodore Wong became Jinshi in 1909. He began supervising the Shanghai-Nanjing Railroad in 1909. In 1911 he became the Chinese Educational Mission's manager, and so began living in Washington, D.C. In 1919, he was killed with two other Chinese men. He died of blunt force trauma and gunshot wounds. A man was prosecuted for the killing, but the courts overturned his sentence in the case Ziang Sung Wan v. United States.

Due to preservatives, his body was taken back to China on February 14, 1920; an open-casket funeral was held on March 7 of that year at Church of Our Savior in Shanghai.
