= 2026 World Weightlifting Championships – Women's 57 kg =

Women's 57 kg at the 2026 World Weightlifting Championships
- Venue: Ningbo Olympic Sports Center
- Location: Ningbo, China
- Dates: 29–30 October
- Competitors: 14 from 13 nations
- Winning total: 227 kg

Medalists
gold medal	Oh Kwang-ok	North Korea
silver medal	Chen Guan-ling	Chinese Taipei
bronze medal	Olha Ivzhenko	Ukraine

The women's 57 kilograms competition at the 2026 World Weightlifting Championships was held on 29 and 30 October 2026.

== Schedule ==
Date	Time	Event
29 October 2026	11:00	Group B
30 October 2026	16:00	Group A

== Records ==
Prior to this competition, the existing world records were as follows.

World record	Snatch	Oh Kwang-ok (PRK)	104 kg	Nagoya, Japan	25 September 2026
World record	Clean & Jerk	Oh Kwang-ok (PRK)	134 kg	Nagoya, Japan	25 September 2026
World record	Total	Oh Kwang-ok (PRK)	238 kg	Nagoya, Japan	25 September 2026

== Results ==
Rank	Athlete	Group	Snatch (kg)				Clean & Jerk (kg)				Total
Rank	Athlete	Group	1	2	3	Rank	1	2	3	Rank	Total
1st place, gold medalist(s)	Oh Kwang-ok (PRK)	A	97	~~102~~	102	1st place, gold medalist(s)	~~125~~	125	~~130~~	1st place, gold medalist(s)	227
2nd place, silver medalist(s)	Chen Guan-ling (TPE)	A	~~90~~	90	~~93~~	3rd place, bronze medalist(s)	117	119	125	2nd place, silver medalist(s)	215
3rd place, bronze medalist(s)	Olha Ivzhenko (UKR)	A	91	94	96	2nd place, silver medalist(s)	113	116	118	4	214
4	Aleksandra Grigoryan (ARM)	A	85	~~90~~	~~90~~	6	~~113~~	114	120	3rd place, bronze medalist(s)	205
5	Şabnam Kerimbaýewa (TKM)	A	83	86	89; WYR	4	103	107	112	6	201; WYR
6	Shoely Mego (PER)	A	82	~~86~~	~~86~~	10	108	112	~~115~~	5	194
7	Rose Harvey (CAN)	A	82	84	~~86~~	8	~~108~~	108	~~111~~	8	192
8	Waka Sato (JPN)	A	80	~~83~~	83	9	103	106	109	7	192
9	Natalia Ilina (RUS)	A	83	86	88	5	103	~~107~~	~~107~~	9	191
10	Annelien Vandenabeele (BEL)	A	80	83	85	7	97	100	103	10	188
11	Marlous Schuilwerve (NED)	A	82	~~85~~	~~85~~	11	100	~~103~~	~~104~~	11	182
12	Donna Berglund (SWE)	A	~~73~~	73	76	12	95	99	~~104~~	12	175
13	Anwar Al-Kandari (KUW)	B	50	53	~~56~~	14	65	~~70~~	~~70~~	13	118
14	Danah Boghaith (KUW)	B	~~50~~	~~50~~	55	13	~~60~~	60	~~64~~	14	115
