= Chiraphan Nanthawong =

Thai weightlifter (born 1999)

Personal information
- Nationality: Thai
- Born: 17 August 1999 (age 26)
- Height: 1.40 m (4 ft 7 in)
- Weight: 44.47 kg (98 lb)

Sport
- Country: Thailand
- Sport: Weightlifting
- Event: –45 kg
Medal record
World Championships
Silver medal – second place	2018 Ashgabat	–45 kg

Chiraphan Nanthawong (born 17 August 1999) is a Thai weightlifter.

She participated at the 2018 World Weightlifting Championships, winning a medal.
