= Qatar Cup (weightlifting) =

The Qatar Weightlifting Cup is organised by the Qatar Weightlifting Federation under the rules and regulations of the International Weightlifting Federation (IWF).

== Edition ==
Year	Edition		Venue	Ref.
Year	M	W	Venue	Ref.
2013	1	1	Doha, Qatar	
2014	2	2	Doha, Qatar	
2015	3	3	Doha, Qatar	
2016	4	4	Doha, Qatar	
2018	5	5	Doha, Qatar	
2019	6	6	Doha, Qatar	
2022–23	7	7	Doha, Qatar	
2023	8	8	Doha, Qatar	
2024	9	9	Doha, Qatar	
