= List of Algerian records in Olympic weightlifting =

The following are the national records in Olympic weightlifting in Algeria. Records are maintained in each weight class for the snatch lift, clean and jerk lift, and the total for both lifts by the Federation Algerienne D'Halterophilie.

== Current records ==
=== Men ===
Event	Record	Athlete	Date	Meet	Place	Ref
60 kg
Snatch						
Clean & Jerk						
Total						
65 kg
Snatch						
Clean & Jerk						
Total						
71 kg
Snatch	133 kg	Akram Chekhchoukh	9 November 2025	Islamic Solidarity Games	Riyadh, Saudi Arabia	
Clean & Jerk						
Total						
79 kg
Snatch	141 kg	Samir Fardjallah	10 November 2025	Islamic Solidarity Games	Riyadh, Saudi Arabia	
Clean & Jerk	171 kg	Samir Fardjallah	10 November 2025	Islamic Solidarity Games	Riyadh, Saudi Arabia	
Total	312 kg	Samir Fardjallah	10 November 2025	Islamic Solidarity Games	Riyadh, Saudi Arabia	
88 kg
Snatch						
Clean & Jerk						
Total						
94 kg
Snatch	156 kg	Faris Touairi	11 November 2025	Islamic Solidarity Games	Riyadh, Saudi Arabia	
Clean & Jerk	191 kg	Faris Touairi	11 November 2025	Islamic Solidarity Games	Riyadh, Saudi Arabia	
Total	347 kg	Faris Touairi	11 November 2025	Islamic Solidarity Games	Riyadh, Saudi Arabia	
110 kg
Snatch						
Clean & Jerk						
Total						
+110 kg
Snatch						
Clean & Jerk						
Total						

=== Women ===
Event	Record	Athlete	Date	Meet	Place	Ref
48 kg
Snatch	56 kg	Nadia Katbi	8 November 2025	Islamic Solidarity Games	Riyadh, Saudi Arabia	
Clean & Jerk	70 kg	Nadia Katbi	8 November 2025	Islamic Solidarity Games	Riyadh, Saudi Arabia	
Total	126 kg	Nadia Katbi	8 November 2025	Islamic Solidarity Games	Riyadh, Saudi Arabia	
53 kg
Snatch	53 kg	Saadi Bouchra	8 November 2025	Islamic Solidarity Games	Riyadh, Saudi Arabia	
Clean & Jerk	68 kg	Saadi Bouchra	8 November 2025	Islamic Solidarity Games	Riyadh, Saudi Arabia	
Total	121 kg	Saadi Bouchra	8 November 2025	Islamic Solidarity Games	Riyadh, Saudi Arabia	
58 kg
Snatch	73 kg	Dris Inas	9 November 2025	Islamic Solidarity Games	Riyadh, Saudi Arabia	
Clean & Jerk	88 kg	Dris Inas	9 November 2025	Islamic Solidarity Games	Riyadh, Saudi Arabia	
Total	161 kg	Dris Inas	9 November 2025	Islamic Solidarity Games	Riyadh, Saudi Arabia	
63 kg
Snatch						
Clean & Jerk						
Total						
69 kg
Snatch						
Clean & Jerk						
Total						
77 kg
Snatch	80 kg	Bouabdallah Douaa Nawal	11 November 2025	Islamic Solidarity Games	Riyadh, Saudi Arabia	
Clean & Jerk	100 kg	Bouabdallah Douaa Nawal	11 November 2025	Islamic Solidarity Games	Riyadh, Saudi Arabia	
Total	180 kg	Bouabdallah Douaa Nawal	11 November 2025	Islamic Solidarity Games	Riyadh, Saudi Arabia	
86 kg
Snatch						
Clean & Jerk						
Total						
+86 kg
Snatch	101 kg	Yahia Mamoun Amina	12 November 2025	Islamic Solidarity Games	Riyadh, Saudi Arabia	
Clean & Jerk	126 kg	Yahia Mamoun Amina	12 November 2025	Islamic Solidarity Games	Riyadh, Saudi Arabia	
Total	227 kg	Yahia Mamoun Amina	12 November 2025	Islamic Solidarity Games	Riyadh, Saudi Arabia	

== Historical records ==
=== Men (2018–2025) ===
Event	Record	Athlete	Date	Meet	Place	Ref
55 kg
Snatch	80 kg	Abdelraouf Chetioui	27 May 2021	African Championships	Nairobi, Kenya	
Clean & Jerk	121 kg	Abdelraouf Chetioui	27 May 2021	African Championships	Nairobi, Kenya	
Total	201 kg	Abdelraouf Chetioui	27 May 2021	African Championships	Nairobi, Kenya	
61 kg
Snatch	115 kg	Amor Fenni	12 August 2022	Islamic Solidarity Games	Konya, Turkey	
Clean & Jerk	142 kg	Amor Fenni	12 August 2022	Islamic Solidarity Games	Konya, Turkey	
Total	257 kg	Amor Fenni	12 August 2022	Islamic Solidarity Games	Konya, Turkey	
67 kg
Snatch	128 kg	Akram Chekhchoukh	11 March 2024	African Games	Accra, Ghana	
Clean & Jerk	152 kg	Akram Chekhchoukh	May 2023	African Championships	Tunis, Tunisia	
Total	279 kg	Akram Chekhchoukh	May 2023	African Championships	Tunis, Tunisia	
73 kg
Snatch	146 kg	Samir Fardjallah	9 September 2023	World Championships	Riyadh, Saudi Arabia	
Clean & Jerk	174 kg	Samir Fardjallah	May 2023	African Championships	Tunis, Tunisia	
Total	317 kg	Samir Fardjallah	9 September 2023	World Championships	Riyadh, Saudi Arabia	
81 kg
Snatch	145 kg	Ameur Messaoudi	May 2023	African Championships	Tunis, Tunisia	
Clean & Jerk	170 kg	Ameur Messaoudi	May 2023	African Championships	Tunis, Tunisia	
Total	315 kg	Ameur Messaoudi	May 2023	African Championships	Tunis, Tunisia	
89 kg
Snatch	165 kg	Faris Touairi	28 May 2021	African Championships	Nairobi, Kenya	
Clean & Jerk	192 kg	Faris Touairi	May 2023	African Championships	Tunis, Tunisia	
Total	352 kg	Faris Touairi	May 2023	African Championships	Tunis, Tunisia	
96 kg
Snatch	161 kg	Saddam Messaoui	April 2019	African Championships	Cairo, Egypt	
Clean & Jerk	193 kg	Saddam Messaoui	April 2019	African Championships	Cairo, Egypt	
Total	354 kg	Saddam Messaoui	April 2019	African Championships	Cairo, Egypt	
102 kg
Snatch	167 kg	Aymen Touairi	14 July 2023	Arab Games	Bordj El Kiffan, Algeria	
Clean & Jerk	206 kg	Aymen Touairi	4 July 2022	Mediterranean Games	Oran, Algeria	
Total	369 kg	Aymen Touairi	May 2023	African Championships	Tunis, Tunisia	
109 kg
Snatch	150 kg	Elbkour Slim	14 July 2023	Arab Games	Bordj El Kiffan, Algeria	
Clean & Jerk	170 kg	Elbkour Slim	14 July 2023	Arab Games	Bordj El Kiffan, Algeria	
Total	320 kg	Elbkour Slim	14 July 2023	Arab Games	Bordj El Kiffan, Algeria	
+109 kg
Snatch	203 kg	Walid Bidani	9 February 2024	African Championships	Ismailia, Egypt	
Clean & Jerk	235 kg	Walid Bidani	4 July 2022	Mediterranean Games	Oran, Algeria	
Total	437 kg	Walid Bidani	4 July 2022	Mediterranean Games	Oran, Algeria	

=== Women (2018–2025) ===
Event	Record	Athlete	Date	Meet	Place	Ref
45 kg
Snatch	55 kg	Nadia Katbi	10 March 2024	African Games	Accra, Ghana	
Clean & Jerk	68 kg	Nadia Katbi	10 March 2024	African Games	Accra, Ghana	
Total	123 kg	Nadia Katbi	10 March 2024	African Games	Accra, Ghana	
49 kg
Snatch	57 kg	Nadia Katbi	1 July 2022	Mediterranean Games	Oran, Algeria	
Clean & Jerk	67 kg	Nadia Katbi	11 July 2023	Arab Games	Bordj El Kiffan, Algeria	
Total	124 kg	Nadia Katbi	11 July 2023	Arab Games	Bordj El Kiffan, Algeria	
55 kg
Snatch	75 kg	Fatima Zohra Laghouati	27 May 2021	African Championships	Nairobi, Kenya	
Clean & Jerk	80 kg	Fatima Zohra Laghouati	27 May 2021	African Championships	Nairobi, Kenya	
Total	155 kg	Fatima Zohra Laghouati	27 May 2021	African Championships	Nairobi, Kenya	
59 kg
Snatch	77 kg	Fatima Zohra Laghouati	12 July 2023	Arab Games	Bordj El Kiffan, Algeria	
Clean & Jerk	100 kg	Fatima Zohra Laghouati	2 July 2022	Mediterranean Games	Oran, Algeria	
Total	176 kg	Fatima Zohra Laghouati	2 July 2022	Mediterranean Games	Oran, Algeria	
64 kg
Snatch	78 kg	Cherara Ikram	12 March 2024	African Games	Accra, Ghana	
Clean & Jerk	110 kg	Cherara Ikram	12 March 2024	African Games	Accra, Ghana	
Total	178 kg	Cherara Ikram	12 March 2024	African Games	Accra, Ghana	
71 kg
Snatch	100 kg	Maghnia Hammadi	3 July 2022	Mediterranean Games	Oran, Algeria	
Clean & Jerk	121 kg	Maghnia Hammadi	3 July 2022	Mediterranean Games	Oran, Algeria	
Total	221 kg	Maghnia Hammadi	3 July 2022	Mediterranean Games	Oran, Algeria	
76 kg
Snatch	83 kg	Maghnia Hammadi	29 May 2021	African Championships	Nairobi, Kenya	
Clean & Jerk	112 kg	Maghnia Hammadi	29 May 2021	African Championships	Nairobi, Kenya	
Total	195 kg	Maghnia Hammadi	29 May 2021	African Championships	Nairobi, Kenya	
81 kg
Snatch	86 kg	Bouchra Herach	April 2019	African Championships	Cairo, Egypt	
Clean & Jerk	107 kg	Bouchra Herach	14 July 2023	Arab Games	Bordj El Kiffan, Algeria	
Total	192 kg	Bouchra Herach	April 2019	African Championships	Cairo, Egypt	
87 kg
Snatch						
Clean & Jerk						
Total						
+87 kg
Snatch	87 kg	Amina Mamoun	14 March 2024	African Games	Accra, Ghana	
Clean & Jerk	106 kg	Amina Mamoun	14 July 2023	Arab Games	Bordj El Kiffan, Algeria	
Total	193 kg	Amina Mamoun	14 March 2024	African Games	Accra, Ghana	

=== Men (1998–2018) ===
Event	Record	Athlete	Date	Meet	Place	Ref
56 kg
Snatch	95 kg	Amor Fenni	8 November 2014	World Championships	Almaty, Kazakhstan	
Clean & Jerk	120 kg	Amor Fenni	8 November 2014	World Championships	Almaty, Kazakhstan	
Total	215 kg	Amor Fenni	8 November 2014	World Championships	Almaty, Kazakhstan	
62 kg
Snatch	116 kg	Souhail Mairif	8 November 2014	World Championships	Almaty, Kazakhstan	
Clean & Jerk	140 kg	Souhail Mairif	8 November 2014	World Championships	Almaty, Kazakhstan	
Total	256 kg	Souhail Mairif	8 November 2014	World Championships	Almaty, Kazakhstan	
69 kg
Snatch	130 kg	Nafaa Sariak	July 2017	African Championships	Vacoas, Mauritius	
Clean & Jerk	161 kg	Nafaa Sariak	July 2017	African Championships	Vacoas, Mauritius	
Total	291 kg	Nafaa Sariak	July 2017	African Championships	Vacoas, Mauritius	
77 kg
Snatch	138 kg	Smail Choukal	July 2017	African Championships	Vacoas, Mauritius	
Clean & Jerk	165 kg	Amir Belhout	11 November 2014	World Championships	Almaty, Kazakhstan	
Total	300 kg	Amir Belhout	11 November 2014	World Championships	Almaty, Kazakhstan	
85 kg
Snatch	150 kg	Abdallah Mekki	12 November 2014	World Championships	Almaty, Kazakhstan	
Clean & Jerk	177 kg	Abdallah Mekki	21 June 2012	Algerian Championships	Oran, Algeria	
Total	323 kg	Abdallah Mekki	21 June 2012	Algerian Championships	Oran, Algeria	
94 kg
Snatch	155 kg	Saddam Messaoui	13 November 2014	World Championships	Almaty, Kazakhstan	
Clean & Jerk	190 kg	Maamar Boudani	21 June 2012	Algerian Championships	Oran, Algeria	
Total	341 kg	Saddam Messaoui	13 November 2014	World Championships	Almaty, Kazakhstan	
105 kg
Snatch	171 kg	Walid Bidani	26 June 2013	Mediterranean Games	Mersin, Turkey	
Clean & Jerk	191 kg	Walid Bidani	2013	African Championships	Casablanca, Morocco	
Total	354 kg	Walid Bidani	2013	African Championships	Casablanca, Morocco	
+105 kg
Snatch	195 kg	Walid Bidani	5 December 2017	World Championships	Anaheim, United States	
Clean & Jerk	225 kg	Walid Bidani	5 December 2017	World Championships	Anaheim, United States	
Total	420 kg	Walid Bidani	5 December 2017	World Championships	Anaheim, United States	

=== Women (1998–2018) ===
Event	Record	Athlete	Date	Meet	Place	Ref
48 kg
Snatch						
Clean and jerk						
Total						
53 kg
Snatch						
Clean and jerk						
Total						
58 kg
Snatch						
Clean and jerk						
Total						
63 kg
Snatch						
Clean and jerk	127 kg	Laila Lasouani	3 May 2004	African Championships	Tunis, Tunisia	
Total						
69 kg
Snatch						
Clean and jerk						
Total						
75 kg
Snatch						
Clean and jerk						
Total						
90 kg
Snatch						
Clean and jerk						
Total						
+90 kg
Snatch						
Clean and jerk						
Total						
