= List of Moroccan records in Olympic weightlifting =

The following are the records of Morocco in Olympic weightlifting. Records are maintained in each weight class for the snatch lift, clean and jerk lift, and the total for both lifts by the Federation Royale Marocaine.

== Current records ==
=== Men ===
Event	Record	Athlete	Date	Meet	Place	Ref
55 kg
Snatch	90 kg	Issam Harfi	April 2019	African Championships	Cairo, Egypt	
Clean & Jerk	100 kg	Issam Harfi	April 2019	African Championships	Cairo, Egypt	
Total	190 kg	Issam Harfi	April 2019	African Championships	Cairo, Egypt	
61 kg
Snatch	95 kg	Issam Harfi	20 December 2019	Qatar Cup	Doha, Qatar	
Clean & Jerk	130 kg	Mouhcine Mazozi	April 2019	African Championships	Cairo, Egypt	
Total	220 kg	Mouhcine Mazozi	April 2019	African Championships	Cairo, Egypt	
67 kg
Snatch	110 kg	Abderrahmane Rhaloui	May 2023	African Championships	Tunis, Tunisia	
Clean & Jerk	135 kg	Mohamed Moulabbi	May 2023	African Championships	Tunis, Tunisia	
Total	245 kg	Abderrahmane Rhaloui	May 2023	African Championships	Tunis, Tunisia	
73 kg
Snatch	133 kg	Abderrahim Moum	May 2023	African Championships	Tunis, Tunisia	
Clean & Jerk	151 kg	Abderrahim Moum	28 July 2021	Olympic Games	Tokyo, Japan	
Total	278 kg	Abderrahim Moum	28 July 2021	Olympic Games	Tokyo, Japan	
81 kg
Snatch	126 kg	Soufiane Bouhi	22 December 2019	Qatar Cup	Doha, Qatar	
Clean & Jerk	145 kg	Soufiane Bouhi	22 December 2019	Qatar Cup	Doha, Qatar	
Total	271 kg	Soufiane Bouhi	22 December 2019	Qatar Cup	Doha, Qatar	
89 kg
Snatch	140 kg	Said Alioua	10 September 2023	World Championships	Riyadh, Saudi Arabia	
Clean & Jerk	181 kg	Said Alioua	May 2023	African Championships	Tunis, Tunisia	
Total	320 kg	Said Alioua	10 September 2023	World Championships	Riyadh, Saudi Arabia	
96 kg
Snatch	140 kg	Nizar Moussaoui	17 October 2024	Campeonato halterofilia Madrid	Madrid, Spain	
Clean & Jerk	170 kg	Nizar Moussaoui	17 October 2024	Campeonato halterofilia Madrid	Madrid, Spain	
Total	310 kg	Nizar Moussaoui	17 October 2024	Campeonato halterofilia Madrid	Madrid, Spain	
102 kg
Snatch	123 kg	Badreddine Ezzouhari	April 2019	African Championships	Cairo, Egypt	
Clean & Jerk	145 kg	Badreddine Ezzouhari	April 2019	African Championships	Cairo, Egypt	
Total	268 kg	Badreddine Ezzouhari	April 2019	African Championships	Cairo, Egypt	
109 kg
Snatch	135 kg	Mehdi Armilat	December 2019	Qatar Cup	Doha, Qatar	
Clean & Jerk	170 kg	Mehdi Armilat	December 2019	Qatar Cup	Doha, Qatar	
Total	305 kg	Mehdi Armilat	December 2019	Qatar Cup	Doha, Qatar	
+109 kg
Snatch	154 kg	Bilal Bouamr	May 2023	African Championships	Tunis, Tunisia	
Clean & Jerk	190 kg	Bilal Bouamr	11 April 2024	World Cup	Phuket, Thailand	
Total	342 kg	Bilal Bouamr	11 April 2024	World Cup	Phuket, Thailand	

=== Women ===
Event	Record	Athlete	Date	Meet	Place	Ref
45 kg
Snatch	50 kg	Maha Fajreslam	April 2019	African Championships	Cairo, Egypt	
Clean & Jerk	62 kg	Maha Fajreslam	April 2019	African Championships	Cairo, Egypt	
Total	112 kg	Maha Fajreslam	April 2019	African Championships	Cairo, Egypt	
49 kg
Snatch	65 kg	Maha Fajreslam	2 May 2022	Junior World Championships	Heraklion, Greece	
Clean & Jerk	82 kg	Maha Fajreslam	2 May 2022	Junior World Championships	Heraklion, Greece	
Total	147 kg	Maha Fajreslam	2 May 2022	Junior World Championships	Heraklion, Greece	
55 kg
Snatch	69 kg	Maha Fajreslam	6 December 2023	IWF Grand Prix II	Doha, Qatar	
Clean & Jerk	87 kg	Maha Fajreslam	6 December 2023	IWF Grand Prix II	Doha, Qatar	
Total	156 kg	Maha Fajreslam	6 December 2023	IWF Grand Prix II	Doha, Qatar	
59 kg
Snatch	78 kg	Ech-Chaibia Ech-Chachouiy	12 July 2023	Arab Games	Bordj El Kiffan, Algeria	
Clean & Jerk	91 kg	Ech-Chaibia Ech-Chachouiy	15 May 2023	African Championships	Tunis, Tunisia	
Total	167 kg	Ech-Chaibia Ech-Chachouiy	15 May 2023	African Championships	Tunis, Tunisia	
64 kg
Snatch						
Clean & Jerk						
Total						
71 kg
Snatch	88 kg	Rkia Sabihi	11 September 2023	World Championships	Riyadh, Saudi Arabia	
Clean & Jerk	105 kg	Rkia Sabihi	11 September 2023	World Championships	Riyadh, Saudi Arabia	
Total	193 kg	Rkia Sabihi	11 September 2023	World Championships	Riyadh, Saudi Arabia	
76 kg
Snatch	77 kg	Hasnae Larti	22 December 2019	Qatar Cup	Doha, Qatar	
Clean & Jerk	95 kg	Hasnae Larti	22 December 2019	Qatar Cup	Doha, Qatar	
Total	172 kg	Hasnae Larti	22 December 2019	Qatar Cup	Doha, Qatar	
81 kg
Snatch	85 kg	Rkia Sabihi	9 April 2024	World Cup	Phuket, Thailand	
Clean & Jerk	108 kg	Rkia Sabihi	14 July 2023	Arab Games	Bordj El Kiffan, Algeria	
Total	192 kg	Rkia Sabihi	14 July 2023	Arab Games	Bordj El Kiffan, Algeria	
87 kg
Snatch	80 kg	Samira Ouass	29 May 2021	African Championships	Nairobi, Kenya	
Clean & Jerk	100 kg	Samira Ouass	29 May 2021	African Championships	Nairobi, Kenya	
Total	180 kg	Samira Ouass	29 May 2021	African Championships	Nairobi, Kenya	
+87 kg
Snatch						
Clean & Jerk						
Total						

== Historical records ==
=== Women (1998–2018) ===
Event	Record	Athlete	Date	Meet	Place	Ref
48 kg
Snatch						
Clean & Jerk						
Total						
53 kg
Snatch	55 kg	Soumia Dik	13 May 2017	Islamic Solidarity Games	Baku, Azerbaijan	
Clean & Jerk	77 kg	Soumia Dik	13 May 2017	Islamic Solidarity Games	Baku, Azerbaijan	
Total	132 kg	Soumia Dik	13 May 2017	Islamic Solidarity Games	Baku, Azerbaijan	
58 kg
Snatch						
Clean & Jerk						
Total						
63 kg
Snatch						
Clean & Jerk						
Total						
69 kg
Snatch						
Clean & Jerk						
Total						
75 kg
Snatch	75 kg	Samira Ouass	12 August 2016	Olympic Games	Rio de Janeiro, Brazil	
Clean & Jerk	97 kg	Samira Ouass	12 August 2016	Olympic Games	Rio de Janeiro, Brazil	
Total	172 kg	Samira Ouass	12 August 2016	Olympic Games	Rio de Janeiro, Brazil	
90 kg
Snatch	72 kg	Samira Ouass	July 2017	African Championships	Vacoas, Mauritius	
Clean & Jerk	98 kg	Samira Ouass	July 2017	African Championships	Vacoas, Mauritius	
Total	170 kg	Samira Ouass	July 2017	African Championships	Vacoas, Mauritius	
+90 kg
Snatch	82 kg	Wafa Ammouri	26 January 2013	VI Weightlifting Mediterranean Cup	Brindisi, Italy	
Clean & Jerk	110 kg	Wafa Ammouri	26 January 2013	VI Weightlifting Mediterranean Cup	Brindisi, Italy	
Total	192 kg	Wafa Ammouri	26 January 2013	VI Weightlifting Mediterranean Cup	Brindisi, Italy	
