= List of Botswana records in Olympic weightlifting =

The following are the national records in Olympic weightlifting in Botswana. Records are maintained in each weight class for the snatch lift, clean and jerk lift, and the total for both lifts by the Botswana Bodybuilding, Weightlifting and Fitness Association.

== Men ==
Event	Record	Athlete	Date	Meet	Place	Ref
55 kg
Snatch	70 kg	Kgotla Kgaswane	10 December 2019	World Cup	Tianjin, China	
Clean & Jerk	101 kg	Kgotla Alphius N Kgaswane	30 July 2022	Commonwealth Games	Marston Green, United Kingdom	
Total	171 kg	Kgotla Alphius N Kgaswane	30 July 2022	Commonwealth Games	Marston Green, United Kingdom	
61 kg
Snatch	74 kg	Kgotla Kgaswane	2020	6th International Solidarity Championships		
Clean & Jerk	100 kg	Kgotla Kgaswane	27 May 2021	African Championships	Nairobi, Kenya	
Total	171 kg	Kgotla Kgaswane	20 December 2019	Qatar Cup	Doha, Qatar	
67 kg
Snatch						
Clean & Jerk						
Total						
73 kg
Snatch						
Clean & Jerk						
Total						
81 kg
Snatch						
Clean & Jerk						
Total						
89 kg
Snatch	100 kg	Dikabelo Solomon	April 2019	African Championships	Cairo, Egypt	
Clean & Jerk	130 kg	Dikabelo Solomon	April 2019	African Championships	Cairo, Egypt	
Total	230 kg	Dikabelo Solomon	April 2019	African Championships	Cairo, Egypt	
96 kg
Snatch	125 kg	Bokang Alphius Kagiso	April 2019	African Championships	Cairo, Egypt	
Clean & Jerk	140 kg	Bokang Alphius Kagiso	April 2019	African Championships	Cairo, Egypt	
Total	265 kg	Bokang Alphius Kagiso	April 2019	African Championships	Cairo, Egypt	
102 kg
Snatch						
Clean & Jerk						
Total						
109 kg
Snatch						
Clean & Jerk						
Total						
+109 kg
Snatch	125 kg	Bokang Kagiso	May 2023	African Championships	Tunis, Tunisia	
Clean & Jerk	155 kg	Bokang Kagiso	May 2023	African Championships	Tunis, Tunisia	
Total	280 kg	Bokang Kagiso	May 2023	African Championships	Tunis, Tunisia	

== Women ==
Event	Record	Athlete	Date	Meet	Place	Ref
45 kg
Snatch						
Clean & Jerk						
Total						
49 kg
Snatch						
Clean & Jerk						
Total						
55 kg
Snatch						
Clean & Jerk						
Total						
59 kg
Snatch	70 kg	Magdeline Moyengwa	27 July 2021	Olympic Games	Tokyo, Japan	
Clean & Jerk	80 kg	Magdeline Moyengwa	11 December 2019	World Cup	Tianjin, China	
Total	145 kg	Magdeline Moyengwa	11 December 2019	World Cup	Tianjin, China	
64 kg
Snatch						
Clean & Jerk						
Total						
71 kg
Snatch						
Clean & Jerk						
Total						
76 kg
Snatch						
Clean & Jerk						
Total						
81 kg
Snatch						
Clean & Jerk						
Total						
87 kg
Snatch						
Clean & Jerk						
Total						
+87 kg
Snatch						
Clean & Jerk						
Total						
