= Weightlifting at the 2019 African Games =

Sporting competition

- Venue: Nahda Indoor Sports Center
- Location: Rabat, Morocco
- Dates: 25–30 August
- Competitors: 138 from 17 nations

Weightlifting at the 2019 African Games was held from 25 to 30 August 2019 in Rabat, Morocco.

The event served as a qualifier for the 2020 Summer Olympics in Tokyo, Japan.

Later five Egyptian athletes (Abderrahmane Al Sayed, Ibrahim Moustafa, Samar Hossein, Sara Ahmed Samir, Farag Salma) were disqualified due to anti-doping violations.

== Participating nations ==
- Algeria (9)
- Botswana (4)
- Cameroon (8)
- Egypt (20)
- Ghana (5)
- Kenya (8)
- Liberia (1)
- Libya (3)
- Lesotho (3)
- Madagascar (8)
- Mauritius (10)
- Morocco (20)
- Nigeria (19)
- Seychelles (3)
- South Africa (3)
- Sudan (2)
- Tunisia (8)
- Uganda (5)

== Medal table ==
* Host nation (Morocco)

Rank	Nation	Gold	Silver	Bronze	Total
1	Egypt (EGY)	23	16	4	43
2	Nigeria (NGR)	16	16	18	50
3	Cameroon (CMR)	6	6	0	12
4	Madagascar (MAD)	5	4	2	11
5	Tunisia (TUN)	4	5	3	12
6	Algeria (ALG)	3	9	3	15
7	Mauritius (MRI)	3	0	6	9
8	Libya (LBA)	0	2	1	3
9	Morocco (MAR)*	0	1	13	14
10	Ghana (GHA)	0	1	7	8
11	Uganda (UGA)	0	0	3	3
Totals (11 entries)		60	60	60	180

== Medal summary ==
=== Men ===
Event	Gold		Silver		Bronze	
55 kg
Snatch	Jean Ramiarimanana; Madagascar	100 kg	Issam Harfi; Morocco	96 kg	King Kalu; Nigeria	95 kg
Clean & Jerk	King Kalu; Nigeria	123 kg	Jean Ramiarimanana; Madagascar	122 kg	Issam Harfi; Morocco	111 kg
Total	Jean Ramiarimanana; Madagascar	222 kg	King Kalu; Nigeria	218 kg	Issam Harfi; Morocco	207 kg
61 kg
Snatch	Emmanuel Appah; Nigeria	120 kg	Amine Bouhijbha; Tunisia	119 kg	Eric Andriantsitohaina; Madagascar	115 kg
Clean & Jerk	Emmanuel Appah; Nigeria	151 kg	Eric Andriantsitohaina; Madagascar	150 kg	David Akwei; Ghana	127 kg
Total	Emmanuel Appah; Nigeria	271 kg	Eric Andriantsitohaina; Madagascar	265 kg	Jules Andriamahefa; Madagascar	231 kg
67 kg
Snatch	Ahmed Saad; Egypt	134 kg	Tojonirina Andriantsitohaina; Madagascar	132 kg	Ahsaan Shabi; Libya	128 kg
Clean & Jerk	Ahmed Saad; Egypt	165 kg	Ahsaan Shabi; Libya	155 kg	Mohamed Moulab; Morocco	135 kg
Total	Ahmed Saad; Egypt	299 kg	Ahsaan Shabi; Libya	283 kg	Mohamed Moulab; Morocco	243 kg
73 kg
Snatch	Karem Ben Hnia; Tunisia	153 kg AF	~~Moustafa Ibrahim~~; ~~Egypt~~	138 kg	Nafaa Sariak; Algeria	130 kg
Clean & Jerk	Karem Ben Hnia; Tunisia	180 kg	~~Moustafa Ibrahim~~; ~~Egypt~~	175 kg	Nafaa Sariak; Algeria	162 kg
Total	Karem Ben Hnia; Tunisia	333 kg	~~Moustafa Ibrahim~~; ~~Egypt~~	313 kg	Nafaa Sariak; Algeria	292 kg
81 kg
Snatch	Mohamed Mahmoud; Egypt	160 kg	Ramzi Bahloul; Tunisia	147 kg	Mamdum Seldum; Nigeria	146 kg
Clean & Jerk	Mohamed Mahmoud; Egypt	190 kg	Ahmed Elsayed; Egypt	180 kg	Mamdum Seldum; Nigeria	178 kg
Total	Mohamed Mahmoud; Egypt	350 kg	Ahmed Elsayed; Egypt	325 kg	Mamdum Seldum; Nigeria	324 kg
89 kg
Snatch	Karim Abokahla; Egypt	164 kg AF	Desmond Akano; Nigeria	149 kg	Christian Amoah; Ghana	148 kg
Clean & Jerk	Karim Abokahla; Egypt	201 kg AF	Forrester Osei; Ghana	181 kg	Christian Amoah; Ghana	180 kg
Total	Karim Abokahla; Egypt	365 kg AF	Desmond Akano; Nigeria	329 kg	Christian Amoah; Ghana	328 kg
96 kg
Snatch	~~Mohamed Abdelalim~~; ~~Egypt~~	165 kg	Saddam Messaoui; Algeria	161 kg	Zubairi Kubo; Uganda	131 kg
Clean & Jerk	~~Mohamed Abdelalim~~; ~~Egypt~~	208 kg AF	Saddam Messaoui; Algeria	190 kg	Zubairi Kubo; Uganda	170 kg
Total	~~Mohamed Abdelalim~~; ~~Egypt~~	373 kg	Saddam Messaoui; Algeria	351 kg	Zubairi Kubo; Uganda	301 kg
102 kg
Snatch	Ragab Abdelhay; Egypt	170 kg	Joël Essama; Cameroon	159 kg	Patrick Olawale Barde; Nigeria	158 kg
Clean & Jerk	Ragab Abdelhay; Egypt	205 kg	Joël Essama; Cameroon	190 kg	Patrick Olawale Barde; Nigeria	185 kg
Total	Ragab Abdelhay; Egypt	375 kg	Joël Essama; Cameroon	349 kg	Patrick Olawale Barde; Nigeria	343 kg
109 kg
Snatch	Aymen Bacha; Tunisia	167 kg	Gaber Mohamed; Egypt	165 kg	Not awarded	
Clean & Jerk	Gaber Mohamed; Egypt	203 kg	Aymen Bacha; Tunisia	200 kg	Mohamed Abdelaziz; Egypt	195 kg
Total	Gaber Mohamed; Egypt	368 kg	Aymen Bacha; Tunisia	367 kg	Not awarded	
+109 kg
Snatch	~~Abdelrahman Elsayed~~; ~~Egypt~~	165 kg	Rabeh Chouya; Algeria	160 kg	Abdulakeem Tijani Abdul; Nigeria	143 kg
Clean & Jerk	~~Abdelrahman Elsayed~~; ~~Egypt~~	196 kg	Rabeh Chouya; Algeria	195 kg	Abdulakeem Tijani Abdul; Nigeria	180 kg
Total	~~Abdelrahman Elsayed~~; ~~Egypt~~	361 kg	Rabeh Chouya; Algeria	355 kg	Abdulakeem Tijani Abdul; Nigeria	323 kg

=== Women ===
Event	Gold		Silver		Bronze	
45 kg
Snatch	Rosina Randafiarison; Madagascar	70 kg	Stella Kingsley; Nigeria	58 kg	Winnifred Ntumi; Ghana	55 kg
Clean & Jerk	Rosina Randafiarison; Madagascar	85 kg	Stella Kingsley; Nigeria	80 kg	Winnifred Ntumi; Ghana	69 kg
Total	Rosina Randafiarison; Madagascar	155 kg	Stella Kingsley; Nigeria	138 kg	Winnifred Ntumi; Ghana	126 kg
49 kg
Snatch	Roilya Ranaivosoa; Mauritius	75 kg	Zohra Chihi; Tunisia	72 kg	Augustina Nwaokolo; Nigeria	71 kg
Clean & Jerk	Roilya Ranaivosoa; Mauritius	94 kg	Heba Ahmed; Egypt	93 kg	Augustina Nwaokolo; Nigeria	90 kg
Total	Roilya Ranaivosoa; Mauritius	169 kg	Heba Ahmed; Egypt	162 kg	Augustina Nwaokolo; Nigeria	161 kg
55 kg
Snatch	Chika Amalaha; Nigeria	93 kg	Adijat Olarinoye; Nigeria	93 kg	Meriem Ben Miloud; Algeria	62 kg
Clean & Jerk	Adijat Olarinoye; Nigeria	116 kg AF	Chika Amalaha; Nigeria	115 kg	Meriem Ben Miloud; Algeria	86 kg
Total	Adijat Olarinoye; Nigeria	209 kg	Chika Amalaha; Nigeria	208 kg	Meriem Ben Miloud; Algeria	148 kg
59 kg
Snatch	Rafiatu Folashade Lawal; Nigeria	93 kg AF	Basma Ibrahim; Egypt	88 kg	Chaima Rahmouni; Tunisia	87 kg
Clean & Jerk	Rafiatu Folashade Lawal; Nigeria	117 kg	Basma Ibrahim; Egypt	114 kg	Chaima Rahmouni; Tunisia	108 kg
Total	Rafiatu Folashade Lawal; Nigeria	210 kg	Basma Ibrahim; Egypt	202 kg	Chaima Rahmouni; Tunisia	195 kg
64 kg
Snatch	Joy Ogbonne Eze; Nigeria	97 kg	Esraa El-Sayed; Egypt	96 kg	Neama Said; Egypt	90 kg
Clean & Jerk	Joy Ogbonne Eze; Nigeria	121 kg	Neama Said; Egypt	117 kg	Esraa El-Sayed; Egypt	113 kg
Total	Joy Ogbonne Eze; Nigeria	218 kg	Esraa El-Sayed; Egypt	209 kg	Neama Said; Egypt	207 kg
71 kg
Snatch	Rania Mahmoud; Egypt	99 kg	Caroline Oko-Uokha; Nigeria	95 kg	Ketty Lent; Mauritius	82 kg
Clean & Jerk	Rania Mahmoud; Egypt	125 kg	Caroline Oko-Uokha; Nigeria	116 kg	Ketty Lent; Mauritius	105 kg
Total	Rania Mahmoud; Egypt	224 kg	Caroline Oko-Uokha; Nigeria	211 kg	Ketty Lent; Mauritius	181 kg
76 kg
Snatch	~~Sara Ahmed~~; ~~Egypt~~	105 kg	Jeanne Gaëlle Eyenga; Cameroon	88 kg	Alison Sunee; Mauritius	84 kg
Clean & Jerk	~~Sara Ahmed~~; ~~Egypt~~	133 kg	Jeanne Gaëlle Eyenga; Cameroon	107 kg	Alison Sunee; Mauritius	105 kg
Total	~~Sara Ahmed~~; ~~Egypt~~	238 kg	Jeanne Gaëlle Eyenga; Cameroon	195 kg	Alison Sunee; Mauritius	189 kg
81 kg
Snatch	Fatima Otiameh Musa; Nigeria	97 kg	Salma Farag; Egypt	96 kg	Liadi Taiwo; Nigeria	95 kg
Clean & Jerk	Fatima Otiameh Musa; Nigeria	122 kg	Liadi Taiwo; Nigeria	121 kg	Salma Farag; Egypt	120 kg
Total	Fatima Otiameh Musa; Nigeria	219 kg	Salma Farag; Egypt	216 kg	Liadi Taiwo; Nigeria	216 kg
87 kg
Snatch	~~Samar Hussein~~; ~~Egypt~~	106 kg	Clementine Meukeugni; Cameroon	101 kg	Bouchra Hirech; Algeria	86 kg
Clean & Jerk	Clementine Meukeugni; Cameroon	126 kg	~~Samar Hussein~~; ~~Egypt~~	125 kg	Bouchra Hirech; Algeria	110 kg
Total	~~Samar Hussein~~; ~~Egypt~~	231 kg	Clementine Meukeugni; Cameroon	227 kg	Bouchra Hirech; Algeria	196 kg
+87 kg
Snatch	Halima Abbas; Egypt	121 kg AF	Shaima Haridy; Egypt	110 kg	Obehi Joseph; Nigeria	105 kg
Clean & Jerk	Halima Abbas; Egypt	151 kg AF	Shaima Haridy; Egypt	135 kg	Obehi Joseph; Nigeria	130 kg
Total	Halima Abbas; Egypt	272 kg AF	Shaima Haridy; Egypt	245 kg	Obehi Joseph; Nigeria	235 kg
