= Amine Bouhijbha =

Tunisian weightlifter (born 1996)

Personal information
- Born: 28 February 1996 (age 30)

Sport
- Country: Tunisia
- Sport: Weightlifting
- Weight class: 61 kg (2018 onwards); 56 kg (until 2018)
Medal record
Men's weightlifting
Representing Tunisia
African Games
Gold medal – first place	2015 Brazzaville	56 kg
African Championships
Gold medal – first place	2016 Yaoundé	56 kg
Gold medal – first place	2017 Vacoas	56 kg
Gold medal – first place	2019 Cairo	61 kg
Gold medal – first place	2021 Nairobi	61 kg
Gold medal – first place	2022 Cairo	61 kg
Bronze medal – third place	2026 Ismailia	65 kg
Islamic Solidarity Games
Bronze medal – third place	2017 Baku	56 kg
Mediterranean Games
Bronze medal – third place	2022 Oran	61 kg S
Bronze medal – third place	2022 Oran	61 kg CJ

Amine Bouhijbha (born 28 February 1996) is a Tunisian weightlifter. He won the gold medal in the men's 56 kg event at the 2015 African Games held in Brazzaville, Republic of the Congo. He is also a five-time gold medalist at the African Weightlifting Championships.

== Career ==
In 2015, he competed in the men's 56 kg event at the World Weightlifting Championships held in Houston, United States. At the 2017 Islamic Solidarity Games held in Baku, Azerbaijan, he won the bronze medal in the men's 56 kg event.

He represented Tunisia at the 2019 African Games held in Rabat, Morocco and he won the silver medal in the men's 56 kg Snatch event. In 2020, he competed in the men's 61 kg event at the Roma 2020 Weightlifting World Cup held in Rome, Italy. He won the bronze medals in the men's 61 kg Snatch and Clean & Jerk events at the 2022 Mediterranean Games held in Oran, Algeria.

== Achievements ==
Year	Venue	Weight	Snatch (kg)				Clean & Jerk (kg)				Total	Rank
Year	Venue	Weight	1	2	3	Rank	1	2	3	Rank	Total	Rank
World Championships
2015	Houston, United States	56 kg	107	~~111~~	~~111~~	22	~~135~~	~~135~~	~~135~~	—	—	—
Islamic Solidarity Games
2017	Baku, Azerbaijan	56 kg	~~108~~	108	113	—N/a	138	~~141~~	141	—N/a	254	3rd place, bronze medalist(s)
Mediterranean Games
2022	Oran, Algeria	61 kg	116	~~118~~	—	3rd place, bronze medalist(s)	142	~~145~~	150	3rd place, bronze medalist(s)	—N/a	—N/a
