= Weightlifting at the 2018 Mediterranean Games =

- Venue: Constantí Pavilion
- Dates: 23–27 June
- Competitors: 80 from 17 nations

The weightlifting competitions at the 2018 Mediterranean Games took place between 23 and 27 June at the Constantí Pavilion in Constantí.

Athletes competed in 12 weight categories (6 for men and 6 for women).

== Medal summary ==
=== Men's events ===
| Event | | Gold | | Silver | | Bronze | |
| – 62 kg | Snatch | Ahmed Saad (EGY) | 127 kg | Erol Bilgin (TUR) | 126 kg | Josué Brachi (ESP) | 121 kg |
| – 62 kg | Clean & Jerk | Ahmed Saad (EGY) | 157 kg | Erol Bilgin (TUR) | 156 kg | Michael Di Giusto (ITA) | 143 kg |
| – 69 kg | Snatch | Daniyar Ismayilov (TUR) | 152 kg | Mirko Zanni (ITA) | 145 kg | Karem Ben Hnia (TUN) | 144 kg |
| – 69 kg | Clean & Jerk | Daniyar Ismayilov (TUR) | 179 kg | Moustafa Ibrahim (EGY) | 178 kg | Karem Ben Hnia (TUN) | 177 kg |
| – 77 kg | Snatch | Mohamed Ihab (EGY) | 162 kg | Andrés Mata (ESP) | 152 kg | Celil Erdoğdu (TUR) | 146 kg |
| – 77 kg | Clean & Jerk | Mohamed Ihab (EGY) | 190 kg | Andrés Mata (ESP) | 189 kg | Celil Erdoğdu (TUR) | 188 kg |
| – 85 kg | Snatch | Cristiano Ficco (ITA) | 153 kg | Dimitrios Aslanidis (GRE) | 152 kg | Ramzi Bahloul (TUN) | 151 kg |
| – 85 kg | Clean & Jerk | Amar Musić (CRO) | 185 kg | Ramzi Bahloul (TUN) | 184 kg | Dimitrios Aslanidis (GRE) | 183 kg |
| – 94 kg | Snatch | Ragab Abdalla (EGY) | 165 kg | Theodoros Iakovidis (GRE) | 161 kg | Saddam Messaoui (ALG) | 155 kg |
| – 94 kg | Clean & Jerk | Theodoros Iakovidis (GRE) | 195 kg | Ali Alhazzaa (SYR) | 190 kg | Manuel Sánchez (ESP) | 185 kg |
| – 105 kg | Snatch | Gaber Mohamed (EGY) | 162 kg | Aymen Bacha (TUN) | 162 kg | Resul Elvan (TUR) | 160 kg |
| – 105 kg | Clean & Jerk | Gaber Mohamed (EGY) | 204 kg | Resul Elvan (TUR) | 203 kg | Majd Hassan (SYR) | 202 kg |

=== Women's events ===
| Event | | Gold | | Silver | | Bronze | |
| – 48 kg | Snatch | Şaziye Erdoğan (TUR) | 78 kg | Anaïs Michel (FRA) | 75 kg | Alessandra Pagliaro (ITA) | 72 kg |
| – 48 kg | Clean & Jerk | Şaziye Erdoğan (TUR) | 96 kg | Anaïs Michel (FRA) | 92 kg | Heba Ahmed (EGY) | 91 kg |
| – 53 kg | Snatch | Jennifer Lombardo (ITA) | 85 kg | Atenery Hernández (ESP) | 80 kg | Manon Lorentz (FRA) | 79 kg |
| – 53 kg | Clean & Jerk | Jennifer Lombardo (ITA) | 108 kg | Giorgia Russo (ITA) | 102 kg | Manon Lorentz (FRA) | 99 kg |
| – 58 kg | Snatch | Konstantina Benteli (GRE) | 91 kg | Nouha Landoulsi (TUN) | 90 kg | Ayşegül Tekin (TUR) | 86 kg |
| – 58 kg | Clean & Jerk | Ayşegül Tekin (TUR) | 114 kg | Konstantina Benteli (GRE) | 107 kg | Alba Sánchez (ESP) | 105 kg |
| – 63 kg | Snatch | Ghofrane Belkhir (TUN) | 96 kg | Nuray Levent (TUR) | 95 kg | Irene Martínez (ESP) | 94 kg |
| – 63 kg | Clean & Jerk | Nuray Levent (TUR) | 116 kg | Mahassen Fattouh (LBN) | 115 kg | Ghofrane Belkhir (TUN) | 113 kg |
| – 69 kg | Snatch | Sara Ahmed (EGY) | 105 kg | Giorgia Bordignon (ITA) | 97 kg | Milena Gianelli (ITA) | 93 kg |
| – 69 kg | Clean & Jerk | Sara Ahmed (EGY) | 135 kg | Giorgia Bordignon (ITA) | 122 kg | Ilia Hernández (ESP) | 115 kg |
| – 75 kg | Snatch | Lydia Valentín (ESP) | 112 kg | Gaëlle Nayo-Ketchanke (FRA) | 99 kg | Rabia Kaya (TUR) | 98 kg |
| – 75 kg | Clean & Jerk | Lydia Valentín (ESP) | 137 kg | Gaëlle Nayo-Ketchanke (FRA) | 127 kg | Dina Barakat (EGY) | 123 kg |

=== Medal table ===
| Rank | Nation | Gold | Silver | Bronze | Total |
|---|---|---|---|---|---|
| 1 | Egypt | 9 | 1 | 2 | 12 |
| 2 | Turkey | 6 | 4 | 5 | 15 |
| 3 | Italy | 3 | 4 | 3 | 10 |
| 4 | Spain* | 2 | 3 | 5 | 10 |
| 5 | Greece | 2 | 3 | 1 | 6 |
| 6 | Tunisia | 1 | 3 | 4 | 8 |
| 7 | Croatia | 1 | 0 | 0 | 1 |
| 8 | France | 0 | 4 | 2 | 6 |
| 9 | Syria | 0 | 1 | 1 | 2 |
| 10 | Lebanon | 0 | 1 | 0 | 1 |
| 11 | Algeria | 0 | 0 | 1 | 1 |
| Totals (11 entries) | | 24 | 24 | 24 | 72 |

== Participating nations ==
- Algeria (5)
- Bosnia and Herzegovina (1)
- Croatia (1)
- Egypt (9)
- France (4)
- Greece (8)
- Italy (12)
- Kosovo (1)
- Lebanon (1)
- Malta (1)
- Morocco (2)
- Serbia (1)
- Slovenia (2)
- Spain (11)
- Syria (4)
- Tunisia (6)
- Turkey (11)

== Men's results ==
=== Men's 62 kg ===
| Athlete | Group | Snatch (kg) | | | | Clean & Jerk (kg) | | | |
| Athlete | Group | 1 | 2 | 3 | Rank | 1 | 2 | 3 | Rank |
|---|---|---|---|---|---|---|---|---|---|
| Ahmed Saad (EGY) | A | 124 | 127 | — | 1st place, gold medalist(s) | 155 | 157 | — | 1st place, gold medalist(s) |
| Erol Bilgin (TUR) | A | 123 | 126 | ~~128~~ | 2nd place, silver medalist(s) | 147 | 156 | ~~158~~ | 2nd place, silver medalist(s) |
| Josué Brachi (ESP) | A | 119 | 121 | ~~125~~ | 3rd place, bronze medalist(s) | 140 | ~~144~~ | ~~144~~ | 5 |
| Mirco Scarantino (ITA) | A | 115 | 118 | ~~120~~ | 4 | ~~140~~ | 141 | ~~146~~ | 4 |
| Michael Di Giusto (ITA) | A | 111 | 116 | ~~120~~ | 5 | ~~141~~ | 143 | ~~146~~ | 3rd place, bronze medalist(s) |
| Stevan Vladisavljev (SRB) | A | 100 | 105 | 110 | 6 | 130 | 135 | ~~141~~ | 6 |

=== Men's 69 kg ===
| Athlete | Group | Snatch (kg) | | | | Clean & Jerk (kg) | | | |
| Athlete | Group | 1 | 2 | 3 | Rank | 1 | 2 | 3 | Rank |
|---|---|---|---|---|---|---|---|---|---|
| Daniyar İsmayilov (TUR) | A | 146 | 152 | — | 1st place, gold medalist(s) | 176 | ~~179~~ | 179 | 1st place, gold medalist(s) |
| Mirko Zanni (ITA) | A | 141 | 143 | 145 | 2nd place, silver medalist(s) | 170 | ~~174~~ | ~~174~~ | 5 |
| Karem Ben Hnia (TUN) | A | 141 | ~~143~~ | 144 | 3rd place, bronze medalist(s) | 173 | ~~175~~ | 177 | 3rd place, bronze medalist(s) |
| David Sánchez (ESP) | A | 137 | 141 | ~~143~~ | 4 | 165 | 170 | ~~173~~ | 6 |
| Ahmet Turan Okyay (TUR) | A | 140 | ~~144~~ | ~~145~~ | 5 | ~~170~~ | ~~170~~ | ~~174~~ | — |
| Bernardin Matam (FRA) | A | 138 | ~~142~~ | ~~142~~ | 6 | 173 | 175 | ~~177~~ | 4 |
| Acorán Hernández (ESP) | A | 133 | 137 | ~~140~~ | 7 | 160 | ~~165~~ | ~~165~~ | 7 |
| Moustafa Ibrahim (EGY) | A | 136 | ~~142~~ | ~~142~~ | 8 | 173 | 176 | 178 | 2nd place, silver medalist(s) |
| Nafaa Sariak (ALG) | A | ~~135~~ | ~~136~~ | 136 | 9 | ~~160~~ | ~~161~~ | ~~165~~ | — |

=== Men's 77 kg ===
| Athlete | Group | Snatch (kg) | | | | Clean & Jerk (kg) | | | |
| Athlete | Group | 1 | 2 | 3 | Rank | 1 | 2 | 3 | Rank |
|---|---|---|---|---|---|---|---|---|---|
| Mohamed Ehab (EGY) | A | 158 | 162 | ~~166~~ | 1st place, gold medalist(s) | 186 | 190 | ~~196~~ | 1st place, gold medalist(s) |
| Andrés Mata (ESP) | A | 145 | 148 | 152 | 2nd place, silver medalist(s) | 180 | 187 | 189 | 2nd place, silver medalist(s) |
| Celil Erdoğdu (TUR) | A | 142 | ~~146~~ | 146 | 3rd place, bronze medalist(s) | 172 | 181 | 188 | 3rd place, bronze medalist(s) |
| Salvatore Esposito (ITA) | A | 132 | ~~140~~ | ~~143~~ | 4 | 160 | ~~170~~ | ~~173~~ | 4 |
| Konstantinos Rempelis (GRE) | A | ~~125~~ | ~~125~~ | 125 | 5 | 155 | ~~161~~ | ~~161~~ | 5 |

=== Men's 85 kg ===
| Athlete | Group | Snatch (kg) | | | | Clean & Jerk (kg) | | | |
| Athlete | Group | 1 | 2 | 3 | Rank | 1 | 2 | 3 | Rank |
|---|---|---|---|---|---|---|---|---|---|
| Cristiano Ficco (ITA) | A | 145 | 149 | 153 | 1st place, gold medalist(s) | ~~180~~ | 182 | ~~186~~ | 4 |
| Dimitrios Aslanidis (GRE) | A | ~~145~~ | 147 | 152 | 2nd place, silver medalist(s) | ~~181~~ | 183 | ~~186~~ | 3rd place, bronze medalist(s) |
| Ramzi Bahloul (TUN) | A | 140 | 146 | 151 | 3rd place, bronze medalist(s) | 181 | 184 | ~~186~~ | 2nd place, silver medalist(s) |
| Amar Musić (CRO) | A | 135 | 141 | 146 | 4 | 177 | ~~182~~ | 185 | 1st place, gold medalist(s) |
| Matjaž Erjavec (SLO) | A | ~~120~~ | ~~120~~ | 120 | 5 | 143 | 148 | 153 | 5 |

=== Men's 94 kg ===
| Athlete | Group | Snatch (kg) | | | | Clean & Jerk (kg) | | | |
| Athlete | Group | 1 | 2 | 3 | Rank | 1 | 2 | 3 | Rank |
|---|---|---|---|---|---|---|---|---|---|
| Ragab Abdelhay (EGY) | A | 160 | 165 | — | 1st place, gold medalist(s) | ~~200~~ | ~~201~~ | ~~201~~ | — |
| Theodoros Iakovidis (GRE) | A | 155 | 161 | ~~166~~ | 2nd place, silver medalist(s) | 187 | 195 | ~~201~~ | 1st place, gold medalist(s) |
| Saddam Messaoui (ALG) | A | 151 | ~~155~~ | 155 | 3rd place, bronze medalist(s) | 180 | ~~186~~ | ~~186~~ | 4 |
| Manuel Sánchez López (ESP) | A | 150 | 154 | ~~156~~ | 4 | 185 | ~~190~~ | ~~190~~ | 3rd place, bronze medalist(s) |
| Ali Alhazzaa (SYR) | A | 143 | ~~151~~ | 152 | 5 | 190 | ~~196~~ | ~~197~~ | 2nd place, silver medalist(s) |
| Matteo Curcuruto (ITA) | A | 150 | ~~155~~ | ~~155~~ | 6 | 175 | ~~183~~ | ~~186~~ | 5 |
| Eldin Omerović (BIH) | A | ~~123~~ | ~~125~~ | ~~125~~ | — | 151 | ~~156~~ | ~~156~~ | 6 |
