= Aymen Bacha =

Tunisian weightlifter (born 1999)

Personal information
- Born: 26 October 1999 (age 26)

Sport
- Country: Tunisia
- Sport: Weightlifting
Medal record
Men's weightlifting
Representing Tunisia
African Games
Silver medal – second place	2019 Rabat	109 kg
Mediterranean Games
Gold medal – first place	2022 Oran	102 kg CJ
Silver medal – second place	2022 Oran	102 kg S
Silver medal – second place	2018 Tarragona	105 kg S
Silver medal – second place	2026 Taranto	110 kg S
African Championships
Gold medal – first place	2021 Nairobi	109 kg
Gold medal – first place	2026 Ismailia	+110 kg
Bronze medal – third place	2019 Cairo	109 kg

Aymen Bacha (born 26 October 1999) is a Tunisian weightlifter. He represented Tunisia at the 2019 African Games held in Rabat, Morocco, and he won the silver medal in the men's 109 kg event.

In 2018, at the Mediterranean Games held in Tarragona, Catalonia, Spain, he won the silver medal in the 105 kg Snatch event. He won the bronze medal in his event at the 2019 African Weightlifting Championships held in Cairo, Egypt.

In 2020, he finished in 6th place in the men's 109 kg event at the Roma 2020 World Cup in Rome, Italy.

He represented Tunisia at the 2020 Summer Olympics in Tokyo, Japan. He competed in the men's 109 kg event.

He won two medals at the 2022 Mediterranean Games held in Oran, Algeria. He won the silver medal in the men's 102 kg Snatch event and the gold medal in the men's 102 kg Clean & Jerk event.
