= List of Slovenian records in Olympic weightlifting =

The following are the records of Slovenia in Olympic weightlifting. Records are maintained in each weight class for the snatch lift, clean and jerk lift, and the total for both lifts by the Weightlifting Federation of Slovenia.

== Men ==
Event	Record	Athlete	Date	Meet	Place	Ref
55 kg
Snatch						
Clean and Jerk						
Total						
61 kg
Snatch						
Clean & Jerk						
Total						
67 kg
Snatch						
Clean & Jerk						
Total						
73 kg
Snatch						
Clean and Jerk						
Total						
81 kg
Snatch	116 kg	David Birk	9 December 2023	IWF Grand Prix II	Doha, Qatar	
Clean & Jerk	142 kg	David Birk	9 December 2023	IWF Grand Prix II	Doha, Qatar	
Total	258 kg	David Birk	9 December 2023	IWF Grand Prix II	Doha, Qatar	
89 kg
Snatch						
Clean & Jerk						
Total						
96 kg
Snatch	135 kg	Anze Kosmac	22 December 2019	Qatar Cup	Doha, Qatar	
Clean & Jerk	157 kg	Anze Kosmac	22 December 2019	Qatar Cup	Doha, Qatar	
Total	292 kg	Anze Kosmac	22 December 2019	Qatar Cup	Doha, Qatar	
102 kg
Snatch	135 kg	Jure Škedelj	4 July 2022	Mediterranean Games	Oran, Algeria	
Clean and Jerk	167 kg	Jure Škedelj	4 July 2022	Mediterranean Games	Oran, Algeria	
Total	302 kg	Jure Škedelj	4 July 2022	Mediterranean Games	Oran, Algeria	
109 kg
Snatch						
Clean and Jerk						
Total						
+109 kg
Snatch						
Clean and Jerk						
Total						

== Women ==
Event	Record	Athlete	Date	Meet	Place	Ref
45 kg
Snatch						
Clean and Jerk						
Total						
49 kg
Snatch						
Clean and Jerk						
Total						
55 kg
Snatch						
Clean and Jerk						
Total						
59 kg
Snatch	77 kg	Nastasja Štesl	2 July 2022	Mediterranean Games	Oran, Algeria	
Clean & Jerk	95 kg	Nastasja Štesl	2 July 2022	Mediterranean Games	Oran, Algeria	
Total	172 kg	Nastasja Štesl	2 July 2022	Mediterranean Games	Oran, Algeria	
64 kg
Snatch						
Clean and Jerk						
Total						
71 kg
Snatch						
Clean and Jerk						
Total						
76 kg
Snatch						
Clean and Jerk						
Total						
81 kg
Snatch						
Clean and Jerk						
Total						
87 kg
Snatch						
Clean and Jerk						
Total						
+87 kg
Snatch						
Clean and Jerk						
Total						
