= Roilya Ranaivosoa =

Mauritian weightlifter (born 1990)

Personal information
- Full name: Marie Hanitra Roilya Ranaivosoa
- Born: 14 November 1990 (age 35) Curepipe, Mauritius
- Height: 1.60 m (5 ft 3 in)
- Weight: 47.96 kg (106 lb)

Sport
- Country: Mauritius
- Sport: Weightlifting
- Team: National team
Medal record
Women's weightlifting
Representing Mauritius
Commonwealth Games
Silver medal – second place	2022 Birmingham	49 kg
Silver medal – second place	2018 Gold Coast	48 kg
African Games
Gold medal – first place	2015 Brazzaville	53 kg
Gold medal – first place	2019 Rabat	49 kg
Commonwealth Championships
Silver medal – second place	2016 Penang	53 kg
African Championships
Gold medal – first place	2016 Yaoundé	48 kg
Gold medal – first place	2017 Vacoas	48 kg
Gold medal – first place	2018 Mahébourg	53 kg
Silver medal – second place	2019 Cairo	49 kg
Bronze medal – third place	2013 Casablanca	69 kg
- Updated on 30 January 2022

Marie Hanitra Roilya Ranaivosoa (born 14 November 1990), commonly known as Roilya Ranaivosoa, is a Mauritian weightlifter of Malagasy descent, competing in the 48 kg category and representing Mauritius at international competitions.

She competed at several editions of the World Weightlifting Championships. She participated at the 2014 Commonwealth Games in the 58 kg event.

She represented Mauritius at the 2020 Summer Olympics in Tokyo, Japan. She finished in 11th place in the women's 49 kg event.

She won the silver medal in the women's 49 kg event at the 2022 Commonwealth Games held in Birmingham, England. In December 2022, she was elected as member of the IWF Athletes' Commission.

However, her career has been marred by a breach of anti-doping regulations, resulting in her resignation from the International Weightlifting Federation (IWF) Athletes' Commission and subsequent sanctions.

Ranaivosoa's involvement in a doping scandal came to light when the International Testing Agency (ITA), responsible for conducting anti-doping procedures for the IWF, charged her with sample swapping and tampering. The alleged offence occurred in 2016, approximately four months before she participated in the Rio 2016 Olympic Games, where she finished ninth in the 48-kilogram category. The alleged sample swapping occurred during an out-of-competition control in Romania, where she was undergoing a training camp under the controversial Romanian Coach Urdas Constantin.

Following the charges, Ranaivosoa resigned from the IWF Athletes' Commission.

In December 2024, the ITA ruled and confirmed Ranaivosoa’s three-year suspension after she admitted to her wrongdoing in the doping scandal. As part of the sanctions, all her titles and achievements from 24 March 2016 to 23 March 2019 were annulled. This includes the potential revocation of her prestigious Best Sportswoman of the Year awards for 2018 and 2019, pending further review.

The admission of guilt marked a dramatic fall from grace for the athlete, whose career had once been a source of national pride. The ruling has left a significant turn in Mauritian sports, as one of its most prominent figures now faces the consequences of actions that compromised the integrity of the sport.

== Major results ==
Year	Venue	Weight	Snatch (kg)				Clean & Jerk (kg)				Total	Rank
Year	Venue	Weight	1	2	3	Rank	1	2	3	Rank	Total	Rank
Representing Mauritius
Olympic Games
2021	Tokyo, Japan	49 kg	73	~~76~~	~~76~~	12	91	~~95~~	~~96~~	11	164	11
2016	Rio de Janeiro, Brazil (Disqualified)											
World Championships
2019	Pattaya, Thailand (Disqualified)											
2018	Ashgabat, Turkmenistan (Disqualified)											
2017	Anaheim, United States (Disqualified)											
2015	Houston, United States	48 kg	80	~~82~~	~~82~~	14	~~100~~	100	~~104~~	14	180	13
2014	Almaty, Kazakhstan	58 kg	76	79	~~83~~	28	96	101	~~105~~	23	180	25
Commonwealth Games
2018	Gold Coast, Australia (Disqualified)											
2014	Glasgow, Scotland	58 kg	~~82~~	82	~~85~~	9	~~100~~	~~100~~	~~100~~	-	-	-
African Games
2019	Rabat, Morocco	49 kg	75	~~80~~	~~80~~	1st place, gold medalist(s)	92	94	~~95~~	1st place, gold medalist(s)	169	1st place, gold medalist(s)
2015	Brazzaville, Republic of the Congo *	53 kg	80	~~85~~	~~85~~	1st place, gold medalist(s)	103	~~108~~	~~108~~	2nd place, silver medalist(s)	183	1st place, gold medalist(s)
Commonwealth Championships
2016	Penang, Malaysia (Disqualified)											
African Championships
2019	Cairo, Egypt	49 kg	71	~~74~~	~~74~~	2nd place, silver medalist(s)	93	~~96~~	~~98~~	2nd place, silver medalist(s)	164	2nd place, silver medalist(s)
2018	Mahébourg, Mauritius (Disqualified)											
2017	Vacoas, Mauritius (Disqualified)											
2016	Yaoundé, Cameroon (Disqualified)											
2013	Casablanca, Morocco	69 kg	~~71~~	71	~~75~~	4	87	92	95	3rd place, bronze medalist(s)	166	3rd place, bronze medalist(s)

* Originally, she was second place in snatch and total, but later, the originally gold medallist Nigerian Elizabeth Onuah was disqualified.

Olympic Games
Preceded by Kate Foo Kune	Flag bearer for Mauritius; Tokyo 2020 with Richarno Colin	Succeeded by Aurelie Halbwachs; Jean Gaël Laurent L'Entete
