= Walid Bidani =

Algerian weightlifter (born 1994)

- Bidani at the 2024 Olympics

Personal information
- Nationality: Algerian
- Born: 11 June 1994 (age 32) Maghnia, Algeria
- Home town: Algiers, Algeria
- Height: 1.85 m (6 ft 1 in)
- Weight: 124 kg (273 lb)

Sport
- Sport: Weightlifting
- Event: +105 kg
- Coached by: Abdelaziz Mezouar

Achievements and titles
- Personal bests: Snatch: 202 kg (2022, NR); Clean and jerk: 235 kg (2022, NR); Total:437kg (2022, NR)
Medal record
Representing Algeria
Men's weightlifting
African Championships
Gold medal – first place	2012 Nairobi	105 kg
Gold medal – first place	2013 Casablanca	105 kg
Gold medal – first place	2016 Yaoundé	+105 kg
Gold medal – first place	2018 Mahébourg	+105 kg
Gold medal – first place	2019 Cairo	+109 kg
Gold medal – first place	2021 Nairobi	+109 kg
Mediterranean Games
Gold medal – first place	2022 Oran	+102 kg Snatch
Silver medal – second place	2022 Oran	+102 kg Clean&Jerk
- Updated on 5 July 2022

Walid Bidani (born 11 June 1994) is an Algerian weightlifter.

== Career ==
He competed at the 2012 Summer Olympics in the -105 kg event and at the 2016 Summer Olympics in the Men's +105 kg.

He was scheduled to compete in the men's +109 kg event at the 2020 Summer Olympics held in Tokyo, Japan but he was unable to compete as he tested positive for COVID-19.

He won two medals at the 2022 Mediterranean Games held in Oran, Algeria. He won the gold medal in the men's +102 kg Snatch event and the silver medal in the men's +102 kg Clean & Jerk event.

In August 2024, Bidani took part in the men's +102 kg event at the 2024 Summer Olympics held in Paris, France. He made two unsuccessful lifts in the Snatch and finished the competition with no result.

== Major results ==
Year	Venue	Weight	Snatch (kg)				Clean & Jerk (kg)				Total	Rank
Year	Venue	Weight	1	2	3	Rank	1	2	3	Rank	Total	Rank
Olympic Games
2012	London, Great Britain	105 kg	~~160~~	160	~~165~~	—N/a	~~180~~	~~180~~	180	—N/a	340	14
2016	Rio de Janeiro, Brazil	+105 kg	180	185	190	—N/a	~~210~~	211	220	—N/a	410	13
2024	Paris, France	+102 kg	~~190~~	~~190~~	—	—N/a	—	—	—	—N/a	DNF	—
World Championships
2014	Almaty, Kazakhstan	105 kg	165	~~170~~	~~172~~	24	—	—	—	—	—	—
2017	Anaheim, United States	+105 kg	185	191	195	6	215	217	225	10	420	8
2018	Ashgabat, Turkmenistan	+109 kg	190	197	~~201~~	5	~~220~~	~~220~~	~~220~~	—	—	—
2019	Pattaya, Thailand	+109 kg	191	~~197~~	200	3rd place, bronze medalist(s)	222	231	~~238~~	9	431	5
2022	Bogotá, Colombia	+109 kg	195	~~201~~	~~203~~	7	225	~~235~~	—	12	420	9
African Championships
2012	Nairobi, Kenya	105 kg	~~150~~	150	~~160~~	1st place, gold medalist(s)	170	~~180~~	183	1st place, gold medalist(s)	333	1st place, gold medalist(s)
2013	Casablanca, Morocco	105 kg	152	157	163	1st place, gold medalist(s)	181	186	191	1st place, gold medalist(s)	354	1st place, gold medalist(s)
2016	Yaoundé, Cameroon	+105 kg	170	181	—	1st place, gold medalist(s)	195	202	210	1st place, gold medalist(s)	391	1st place, gold medalist(s)
2017	Vacoas, Mauritius	+105 kg	~~180~~	~~180~~	~~180~~	—	180	~~210~~	~~215~~	2nd place, silver medalist(s)	—	—
2018	Mahébourg, Mauritius	+105 kg	~~170~~	170	180	1st place, gold medalist(s)	200	210	~~220~~	1st place, gold medalist(s)	390	1st place, gold medalist(s)
2019	Cairo, Egypt	+109 kg	187	~~195~~	~~198~~	1st place, gold medalist(s)	215	226	~~232~~	2nd place, silver medalist(s)	413	1st place, gold medalist(s)
2021	Nairobi, Kenya	+109 kg	180	190	201	1st place, gold medalist(s)	~~215~~	215	~~232~~	1st place, gold medalist(s)	416	1st place, gold medalist(s)
2023	Tunis, Tunisia	+109 kg	192	~~197~~	~~199~~	1st place, gold medalist(s)	~~225~~	~~225~~	~~225~~	—	—	—
2024	Ismailia, Egypt	+109 kg	190	197	203	1st place, gold medalist(s)	~~222~~	~~222~~	~~222~~	—	—	—
Mediterranean Games
2013	Mersin, Turkey	105 kg	160	166	171	3rd place, bronze medalist(s)	170	~~170~~	~~170~~	—	—	—
2022	Oran, Algeria	+102 kg	190	196	202	1st place, gold medalist(s)	225	235	~~243~~	2nd place, silver medalist(s)	437	—
