= Emmanuel Appah =

Nigerian weightlifter (born 1999)

Personal information
- Born: 5 November 1999 (age 26)

Sport
- Country: Nigeria
- Sport: Weightlifting
- Weight class: 61 kg
Medal record
Men's weightlifting
Representing Nigeria
African Games
Gold medal – first place	2019 Rabat	61 kg
African Championships
Silver medal – second place	2021 Nairobi	61 kg

Emmanuel Inemo Appah (born 5 November 1999) is a Nigerian weightlifter. He represented Nigeria at the 2019 African Games held in Rabat, Morocco and he won the gold medal in the men's 61 kg event. He won the silver medal in his event at the 2021 African Weightlifting Championships held in Nairobi, Kenya.

He competed in the men's 61 kg event at the 2022 Commonwealth Games held in Birmingham, England.
