= Karem Ben Hnia =

Tunisian weightlifter (born 1994)

Personal information
- Nationality: Tunisian
- Born: 13 November 1994 (age 31) Monastir, Tunisia
- Height: 1.65 m (5 ft 5 in)
- Weight: 69 kg (152 lb)

Sport
- Country: Tunisia
- Sport: Weightlifting
Medal record
Men's weightlifting
Representing Tunisia
African Championships
Gold medal – first place	2013 Casablanca	–69 kg
Gold medal – first place	2016 Yaoundé	–69 kg
Gold medal – first place	2017 Vacoas	–69 kg
Gold medal – first place	2018 Mahébourg	–69 kg
Gold medal – first place	2019 Cairo	–73 kg
Gold medal – first place	2021 Nairobi	–73 kg
Gold medal – first place	2023 Tunis	–73 kg
Gold medal – first place	2024 Ismailia	–73 kg
Mediterranean Games
Gold medal – first place	2022 Oran	73 kg CJ
Silver medal – second place	2013 Mersin	69 kg S
Silver medal – second place	2013 Mersin	69 kg CJ
Silver medal – second place	2026 Taranto	75 kg CJ
Bronze medal – third place	2018 Tarragona	69 kg S
Bronze medal – third place	2018 Tarragona	69 kg CJ
Bronze medal – third place	2022 Oran	73 kg S
Bronze medal – third place	2026 Taranto	75 kg S

Karem Ben Hnia (born 13 November 1994) is a Tunisian Olympic weightlifter from the city of Moknine.

== Career ==
Ben Hnia took up weightlifting at the age of eight.

He represented his country at the 2016 Summer Olympics held in Rio de Janeiro, Brazil. He also represented Tunisia at the 2020 Summer Olympics in Tokyo, Japan. He competed in the men's 73 kg event.

He won gold medals in all three Men's 73 kg events at the 2019 African Games.

In August 2024, Ben Hnia competed in the men's 73 kg event at the 2024 Summer Olympics held in Paris, France. He lifted 330 kg in total and placed eighth.

== Major results ==
Year	Venue	Weight	Snatch (kg)				Clean & Jerk (kg)				Total	Rank
Year	Venue	Weight	1	2	3	Rank	1	2	3	Rank	Total	Rank
Olympic Games
2016	Rio de Janeiro, Brazil	69 kg	147	~~150~~	~~150~~	—N/a	~~177~~	~~177~~	~~177~~	—N/a	DNF	—
2021	Tokyo, Japan	73 kg	148	151	153	—N/a	185	~~190~~	~~190~~	—N/a	338	6
2024	Paris, France	73 kg	~~145~~	145	149	—N/a	181	~~186~~	~~187~~	—N/a	330	8
World Championships
2011	Paris, France	62 kg	115	~~120~~	~~120~~	26	145	~~150~~	~~150~~	26	260	27
2015	Houston, United States	69 kg	146	~~149~~	150	5	176	~~181~~	183	5	333	5
2017	Anaheim, United States	69 kg	~~145~~	~~145~~	~~146~~	—	—	—	—	—	—	—
2018	Ashgabat, Turkmenistan	73 kg	146	151	~~154~~	10	180	~~185~~	186	7	337	7
2019	Pattaya, Thailand	73 kg	—	—	—	—	—	—	—	—	—	—
2023	Riyadh, Saudi Arabia	73 kg	~~146~~	146	~~149~~	13	180	186	~~188~~	4	332	6
2024	Manama, Bahrain	73 kg	145	149	~~151~~	11	~~182~~	184	~~188~~	7	333	5
IWF World Cup
2020	Roma, Italy	73 kg	145	149	~~152~~	2nd place, silver medalist(s)	180	184	—	1st place, gold medalist(s)	333	1st place, gold medalist(s)
2024	Phuket, Thailand	73 kg	145	147	~~149~~	18	175	—	—	18	322	15
African Games
2015	Brazzaville, Republic of the Congo	69 kg	135	~~145~~	~~146~~	1st place, gold medalist(s)	170	173	~~180~~	1st place, gold medalist(s)	308	1st place, gold medalist(s)
2019	Rabat, Morocco	73 kg	145	~~150~~	153	1st place, gold medalist(s)	180	~~189~~	—	1st place, gold medalist(s)	333	1st place, gold medalist(s)
African Championships
2012	Nairobi, Kenya	69 kg	~~117~~	117	123	5	150	~~162~~	~~162~~	5	273	5
2013	Casablanca, Morocco	69 kg	135	140	143	1st place, gold medalist(s)	170	178	—	1st place, gold medalist(s)	321	1st place, gold medalist(s)
2016	Yaoundé, Cameroon	69 kg	141	~~147~~	147	1st place, gold medalist(s)	170	~~180~~	~~188~~	1st place, gold medalist(s)	317	1st place, gold medalist(s)
2017	Vacoas, Mauritius	69 kg	140	147	~~150~~	1st place, gold medalist(s)	170	180	~~186~~	1st place, gold medalist(s)	327	1st place, gold medalist(s)
2018	Mahébourg, Mauritius	69 kg	130	140	145	1st place, gold medalist(s)	163	170	175	1st place, gold medalist(s)	320	1st place, gold medalist(s)
2019	Cairo, Egypt	73 kg	144	146	152	1st place, gold medalist(s)	180	186	~~190~~	1st place, gold medalist(s)	338	1st place, gold medalist(s)
2021	Nairobi, Kenya	73 kg	140	~~149~~	150	1st place, gold medalist(s)	~~180~~	~~180~~	180	1st place, gold medalist(s)	330	1st place, gold medalist(s)
2023	Tunis, Tunisia	73 kg	146	~~149~~	~~149~~	1st place, gold medalist(s)	180	~~187~~	~~187~~	1st place, gold medalist(s)	326	1st place, gold medalist(s)
2024	Ismailia, Egypt	73 kg	~~144~~	145	—	1st place, gold medalist(s)	175	—	—	1st place, gold medalist(s)	320	1st place, gold medalist(s)
