= Alison Sunee =

Mauritian weightlifter (born 1999)

Personal information
- Born: 20 July 1999 (age 26)

Sport
- Country: Mauritius
- Sport: Weightlifting
Medal record
Women's weightlifting
Representing Mauritius
African Games
| Bronze medal – third place | 2019 Rabat | 76 kg |
African Championships
| Gold medal – first place | 2018 Mahébourg | 75 kg |
| Silver medal – second place | 2017 Vacoas | 75 kg |
| Silver medal – second place | 2019 Cairo | 76 kg |
| Bronze medal – third place | 2022 Cairo | 87 kg |

Alison Sunee (born 20 July 1999) is a Mauritian weightlifter. She represented Mauritius at the 2019 African Games held in Rabat, Morocco, and won the bronze medal in the women's 76 kg event. She has also won several medals, including gold, at the African Weightlifting Championships.

In 2018, she competed in the women's 75 kg event at the Commonwealth Games held in Gold Coast, Australia.
