= Stella Kingsley =

Nigerian weightlifter (born 2002)

Personal information
- Born: 13 November 2002 (age 23)

Sport
- Country: Nigeria
- Sport: Weightlifting
- Weight class: 49 kg
Medal record
Women's weightlifting
Representing Nigeria
African Games
Silver medal – second place	2019 Rabat	45 kg
African Championships
Gold medal – first place	2021 Nairobi	49 kg
Commonwealth Championships
Gold medal – first place	2021 Tashkent	49 kg

Stella Peter Kingsley (born 13 November 2002) is a Nigerian weightlifter. She represented Nigeria at the 2019 African Games held in Rabat, Morocco and she won the silver medal in the women's 45 kg event. She also represented Nigeria at the 2022 Commonwealth Games held in Birmingham, England.

== Career ==
Kingsley won the gold medal in the women's 49 kg event at the 2021 African Weightlifting Championships held in Nairobi, Kenya. She also competed in the women's 49 kg event at the 2021 World Weightlifting Championships held in Tashkent, Uzbekistan. She finished in 5th place in this competition. The 2021 Commonwealth Weightlifting Championships were also held at the same time and her total result gave her the gold medal in this event. As a result, she qualified to compete at the 2022 Commonwealth Games in Birmingham, England.

Kingsley finished in 4th place in the women's 49 kg event at the 2022 Commonwealth Games.

== Achievements ==
Year	Venue	Weight	Snatch (kg)				Clean & Jerk (kg)				Total	Rank
Year	Venue	Weight	1	2	3	Rank	1	2	3	Rank	Total	Rank
World Championships
2021	Tashkent, Uzbekistan	49 kg	68	72	~~74~~	9	88	94	96	4	168	5
Commonwealth Games
2022	Birmingham, England	49 kg	70	73	75	—N/a	91	95	~~98~~	—N/a	170	4
African Games
2019	Rabat, Morocco	45 kg	55	58	~~61~~	2nd place, silver medalist(s)	75	80	~~82~~	2nd place, silver medalist(s)	138	2nd place, silver medalist(s)
African Championships
2021	Nairobi, Kenya	49 kg	68	71	~~71~~	2nd place, silver medalist(s)	88	93	95	1st place, gold medalist(s)	166	1st place, gold medalist(s)
Commonwealth Championships
2021	Tashkent, Uzbekistan	49 kg	68	72	~~74~~	—N/a	88	94	96	—N/a	168	1st place, gold medalist(s)
