= 2021 African Weightlifting Championships =

International weightlifting competition

2021 African Championships
- Host city: Nairobi, Kenya
- Dates: 27–29 May
- Main venue: Ruaraka Sports Club

The 2021 African Weightlifting Championships was held in Nairobi, Kenya from 27 to 29 May 2021.

== Medal summary ==
=== Men ===
Event	Gold		Silver		Bronze	
55 kg
Snatch	Jean Ramiarimanana; Madagascar	100 kg	Abdelraouf Chetioui; Algeria	80 kg		
Clean & Jerk	Abdelraouf Chetioui; Algeria	121 kg	Jean Ramiarimanana; Madagascar	120 kg		
Total	Jean Ramiarimanana; Madagascar	220 kg	Abdelraouf Chetioui; Algeria	201 kg		
61 kg
Snatch	Emmanuel Appah; Nigeria	115 kg	Amine Bouhijbha; Tunisia	113 kg	Eric Andriantsitohaina; Madagascar	102 kg
Clean & Jerk	Amine Bouhijbha; Tunisia	143 kg	Emmanuel Appah; Nigeria	140 kg	Eric Andriantsitohaina; Madagascar	132 kg
Total	Amine Bouhijbha; Tunisia	256 kg	Emmanuel Appah; Nigeria	255 kg	Eric Andriantsitohaina; Madagascar	239 kg
67 kg
Snatch	Tojonirina Andriantsitohaina; Madagascar	137 kg	Adel Lahcen; Algeria	120 kg	Julius Ssekitoleko; Uganda	100 kg
Clean & Jerk	Tojonirina Andriantsitohaina; Madagascar	166 kg	Adel Lahcen; Algeria	145 kg	Mohamed Moulabbi; Morocco	131 kg
Total	Tojonirina Andriantsitohaina; Madagascar	303 kg AF	Adel Lahcen; Algeria	265 kg	Julius Ssekitoleko; Uganda	230 kg
73 kg
Snatch	Karem Ben Hnia; Tunisia	150 kg	Nafaa Sariak; Algeria	135 kg	Abderrahim Moum; Morocco	126 kg
Clean & Jerk	Karem Ben Hnia; Tunisia	180 kg	Nafaa Sariak; Algeria	170 kg	Abderrahim Moum; Morocco	143 kg
Total	Karem Ben Hnia; Tunisia	330 kg	Nafaa Sariak; Algeria	305 kg	Abderrahim Moum; Morocco	269 kg
81 kg
Snatch	Ramzi Bahloul; Tunisia	140 kg	Ahmed Valdy Njoya; Cameroon	131 kg	Samir Fardjallah; Algeria	130 kg
Clean & Jerk	Ramzi Bahloul; Tunisia	166 kg	Ahmed Valdy Njoya; Cameroon	165 kg	Samir Fardjallah; Algeria	161 kg
Total	Ramzi Bahloul; Tunisia	306 kg	Ahmed Valdy Njoya; Cameroon	296 kg	Samir Fardjallah; Algeria	291 kg
89 kg
Snatch	Faris Touairi; Algeria	165 kg AF	Maurice Oduor Amoro; Kenya	102 kg		
Clean & Jerk	Faris Touairi; Algeria	170 kg	Maurice Oduor Amoro; Kenya	132 kg		
Total	Faris Touairi; Algeria	335 kg	Maurice Oduor Amoro; Kenya	234 kg		
96 kg
Snatch	Ahmed Abuzriba; Libya	150 kg	Christian Amoah; Ghana	149 kg	Salim Messaoui; Algeria	146 kg
Clean & Jerk	Ahmed Abuzriba; Libya	186 kg	Christian Amoah; Ghana	184 kg	Salim Messaoui; Algeria	176 kg
Total	Ahmed Auzriba; Libya	336 kg	Christian Amoah; Ghana	333 kg	Salim Messaoui; Algeria	322 kg
102 kg
Snatch	Joël Essama; Cameroon	156 kg	Farid Saadi; Algeria	146 kg	Christoffel Reeders; South Africa	131 kg
Clean & Jerk	Joël Essama; Cameroon	190 kg	Farid Saadi; Algeria	171 kg	Christoffel Reeders; South Africa	160 kg
Total	Joël Essama; Cameroon	346 kg	Farid Saadi; Algeria	317 kg	Christoffel Reeders; South Africa	290 kg
109 kg
Snatch	Aymen Bacha; Tunisia	170 kg	Ayoub Dridi; Tunisia	135 kg		
Clean & Jerk	Aymen Bacha; Tunisia	200 kg	Ayoub Dridi; Tunisia	160 kg		
Total	Aymen Bacha; Tunisia	370 kg	Ayoub Dridi; Tunisia	295 kg		
+109 kg
Snatch	Walid Bidani; Algeria	201 kg AF				
Clean & Jerk	Walid Bidani; Algeria	215 kg				
Total	Walid Bidani; Algeria	416 kg				

=== Women ===
Event	Gold		Silver		Bronze	
45 kg
Snatch	Rosina Randafiarison; Madagascar	65 kg	Janet Oduor; Kenya	42 kg		
Clean & Jerk	Rosina Randafiarison; Madagascar	70 kg	Janet Oduor; Kenya	50 kg		
Total	Rosina Randafiarison; Madagascar	135 kg	Janet Oduor; Kenya	92 kg		
49 kg
Snatch	Zohra Chihi; Tunisia	72 kg	Stella Kingsley; Nigeria	71 kg	Augustina Nkem Nwaokolo; Nigeria	71 kg
Clean & Jerk	Stella Kingsley; Nigeria	95 kg	Zohra Chihi; Tunisia	92 kg	Augustina Nkem Nwaokolo; Nigeria	89 kg
Total	Stella Kingsley; Nigeria	166 kg	Zohra Chihi; Tunisia	164 kg	Augustina Nkem Nwaokolo; Nigeria	160 kg
55 kg
Snatch	Adijat Adenike Olarinoye; Nigeria	90 kg	Fatima Zohra Laghouati; Algeria	75 kg	Caroline Wairimu; Kenya	40 kg
Clean & Jerk	Adijat Adenike Olarinoye; Nigeria	110 kg	Fatima Zohra Laghouati; Algeria	80 kg	Caroline Wairimu; Kenya	60 kg
Total	Adijat Adenike Olarinoye; Nigeria	200 kg	Fatima Zohra Laghouati; Algeria	155 kg	Caroline Wairimu; Kenya	100 kg
59 kg
Snatch	Rafiatu Folashade Lawal; Nigeria	90 kg	Nouha Landoulsi; Tunisia	89 kg	Anneke Spies; South Africa	75 kg
Clean & Jerk	Rafiatu Folashade Lawal; Nigeria	111 kg	Winny Chepngeno Langat; Kenya	81 kg	Magdeline Moyengwa; Botswana	75 kg
Total	Rafiatu Folashade Lawal; Nigeria	201 kg	Winny Chepngeno Langat; Kenya	142 kg	Magdeline Moyengwa; Botswana	135 kg
64 kg
Snatch	Joy Ogbonne Eze; Nigeria	88 kg	Ikram Cherrara; Algeria	65 kg	Rachael Achieng Kengere; Kenya	60 kg
Clean & Jerk	Joy Ogbonne Eze; Nigeria	110 kg	Ikram Cherrara; Algeria	75 kg	Rachael Achieng Kengere; Kenya	70 kg
Total	Joy Ogbonne Eze; Nigeria	198 kg	Ikram Cherrara; Algeria	140 kg	Rachael Achieng Kengere; Kenya	130 kg
71 kg
Snatch	Yosra Abidi; Tunisia	82 kg	Kheira Hammou; Algeria	80 kg	Jaoueher Guesmi; Tunisia	78 kg
Clean & Jerk	Yosra Abidi; Tunisia	111 kg	Jaoueher Guesmi; Tunisia	110 kg	Kheira Hammou; Algeria	70 kg
Total	Yosra Abidi; Tunisia	193 kg	Jaoueher Guesmi; Tunisia	188 kg	Kheira Hammou; Algeria	150 kg
76 kg
Snatch	Jeanne Eyenga; Cameroon	96 kg	Liadi Taiwo; Nigeria	91 kg	Maghnia Hammadi; Algeria	83 kg
Clean & Jerk	Jeanne Eyenga; Cameroon	117 kg	Liadi Taiwo; Nigeria	116 kg	Maghnia Hammadi; Algeria	112 kg
Total	Jeanne Eyenga; Cameroon	213 kg	Liadi Taiwo; Nigeria	207 kg	Maghnia Hammadi; Algeria	195 kg
81 kg
Snatch	Bouchra Fatima Zohra Hirech; Algeria	81 kg				
Clean & Jerk	Bouchra Fatima Zohra Hirech; Algeria	105 kg				
Total	Bouchra Fatima Zohra Hirech; Algeria	186 kg				
87 kg
Snatch	Clémentine Meukeugni; Cameroon	100 kg	Ameni Ben Moussa; Tunisia	81 kg	Samira Ouass; Morocco	80 kg
Clean & Jerk	Clémentine Meukeugni; Cameroon	121 kg	Ameni Ben Moussa; Tunisia	102 kg	Samira Ouass; Morocco	100 kg
Total	Clémentine Meukeugni; Cameroon	221 kg	Ameni Ben Moussa; Tunisia	183 kg	Samira Ouass; Morocco	180 kg

== Medal table ==
Ranking by Big (Total result) medals

* Host nation (Kenya)

Rank	Nation	Gold	Silver	Bronze	Total
1	Tunisia	5	4	0	9
2	Nigeria	4	2	1	7
3	Algeria	3	5	4	12
4	Cameroon	3	1	0	4
5	Madagascar	3	0	1	4
6	Libya	1	0	0	1
7	Kenya*	0	3	2	5
8	Morocco	0	1	2	3
9	Ghana	0	1	0	1
10	Botswana	0	0	1	1
10	South Africa	0	0	1	1
10	Uganda	0	0	1	1
Totals (12 entries)		19	17	13	49

Ranking by all medals: Big (Total result) and Small (Snatch and Clean & Jerk)

* Host nation (Kenya)

Rank	Nation	Gold	Silver	Bronze	Total
1	Tunisia	15	12	1	28
2	Nigeria	12	6	3	21
3	Algeria	9	16	11	36
4	Cameroon	9	3	0	12
5	Madagascar	8	1	3	12
6	Libya	3	0	0	3
7	Morocco	1	2	7	10
8	Kenya*	0	8	6	14
9	Ghana	0	3	0	3
10	South Africa	0	0	4	4
11	Botswana	0	0	2	2
11	Uganda	0	0	2	2
Totals (12 entries)		57	51	39	147

== Participating nations ==
- Algeria (14)
- Botswana (3)
- Cameroon (4)
- Ghana (1)
- Kenya (9)
- Libya (1)
- Lesotho (2)
- Madagascar (4)
- Morocco (3)
- Nigeria (7)
- South Africa (3)
- Tunisia (10)
- Uganda (6)
