= Maghnia Hammadi =

Algerian weightlifter (born 2000)

Personal information
- Born: 22 February 2000 (age 26)

Sport
- Country: Algeria
- Sport: Weightlifting
Medal record
Women's weightlifting
Representing Algeria
Mediterranean Games
Silver medal – second place	2022 Oran	71 kg S
Bronze medal – third place	2022 Oran	71 kg CJ
African Championships
Gold medal – first place	2017 Vacoas	75 kg
Bronze medal – third place	2021 Nairobi	76 kg

Maghnia Hammadi (born 22 February 2000) is an Algerian weightlifter. She won the gold medal in her event at the 2017 African Weightlifting Championships held in Vacoas, Mauritius. She won the bronze medal in her event at the 2021 African Weightlifting Championships held in Nairobi, Kenya.

She won two medals at the 2022 Mediterranean Games held in Oran, Algeria. She won the silver medal in the women's 71 kg Snatch event and the bronze medal in the women's 71 kg Clean & Jerk event.

== Achievements ==
Year	Venue	Weight	Snatch (kg)				Clean & Jerk (kg)				Total	Rank
Year	Venue	Weight	1	2	3	Rank	1	2	3	Rank	Total	Rank
Mediterranean Games
2022	Oran, Algeria	71 kg	91	96	100	2nd place, silver medalist(s)	117	121	~~127~~	3rd place, bronze medalist(s)	—N/a	—N/a
