= 2016 African Weightlifting Championships =

International weightlifting competition

2016 African Championships
- Host city: Yaoundé, Cameroon
- Dates: May 7 – 13

The 2016 African Weightlifting Championships was held in Yaoundé, Cameroon between May 7 and May 13, 2016.

== Medal summary ==
Results are obtained from the IWF website.

=== Men ===
| Event | Gold | | Silver | | Bronze | |
56 kg
| Snatch | Amine Bouhijbha; Tunisia | 105 kg | Eric Andriantsitohaina; Madagascar | 100 kg | Abdelghani Chigar; Morocco | 97 kg |
| Clean & Jerk | Amine Bouhijbha; Tunisia | 131 kg | Eric Andriantsitohaina; Madagascar | 130 kg | Abdelghani Chigar; Morocco | 105 kg |
| Total | Amine Bouhijbha; Tunisia | 236 kg | Eric Andriantsitohaina; Madagascar | 230 kg | Abdelghani Chigar; Morocco | 202 kg |
62 kg
| Snatch | Tojonirina Andriantsitohaina; Madagascar | 118 kg | Amor Fenni; Algeria | 116 kg | Faouzi Kraydi; Tunisia | 115 kg |
| Clean & Jerk | Olivier Matam; Cameroon | 147 kg | Charles Ssekyaaya; Uganda | 146 kg | Tojonirina Andriantsitohaina; Madagascar | 145 kg |
| Total | Tojonirina Andriantsitohaina; Madagascar | 263 kg | Olivier Matam; Cameroon | 262 kg | Charles Ssekyaaya; Uganda | 261 kg |
69 kg
| Snatch | Karem Ben Hnia; Tunisia | 147 kg | Yassin Abdalla; Egypt | 140 kg | Hassine Ben Hamida; Tunisia | 124 kg |
| Clean & Jerk | Karem Ben Hnia; Tunisia | 170 kg | Yassin Abdalla; Egypt | 160 kg | Hassine Ben Hamida; Tunisia | 151 kg |
| Total | Karem Ben Hnia; Tunisia | 317 kg | Yassin Abdalla; Egypt | 300 kg | Hassine Ben Hamida; Tunisia | 275 kg |
77 kg
| Snatch | Rami Bahloul; Tunisia | 144 kg | Ramzi Bahloul; Tunisia | 144 kg | Jean-Baptiste Yanou; Cameroon | 140 kg |
| Clean & Jerk | Ramzi Bahloul; Tunisia | 171 kg | Rami Bahloul; Tunisia | 170 kg | Jean-Baptiste Yanou; Cameroon | 162 kg |
| Total | Ramzi Bahloul; Tunisia | 315 kg | Rami Bahloul; Tunisia | 314 kg | Jean-Baptiste Yanou; Cameroon | 302 kg |
85 kg
| Snatch | Housseyn Fardjallah; Algeria | 150 kg | Ezzeldin Thabet; Egypt | 147 kg | Amir Belhout; Algeria | 146 kg |
| Clean & Jerk | Ezzeldin Thabet; Egypt | 188 kg | Housseyn Fardjallah; Algeria | 185 kg | Amir Belhout; Algeria | 165 kg |
| Total | Ezzeldin Thabet; Egypt | 355 kg | Housseyn Fardjallah; Algeria | 355 kg | Amir Belhout; Algeria | 311 kg |
94 kg
| Snatch | Saddam Messaoui; Algeria | 150 kg | Petit Minkoumba; Cameroon | 142 kg | Achraf Maatoug; Tunisia | 140 kg |
| Clean & Jerk | Aymen Touairi; Algeria | 185 kg | Saddam Messaoui; Algeria | 179 kg | Achraf Maatoug; Tunisia | 178 kg |
| Total | Saddam Messaoui; Algeria | 329 kg | Achraf Maatoug; Tunisia | 318 kg | Petit Minkoumba; Cameroon | 315 kg |
105 kg
| Snatch | Joël Essama; Cameroon | 135 kg | Mohammed Fethi; Algeria | 135 kg | Zakaria Bertali; Morocco | 131 kg |
| Clean & Jerk | Joël Essama; Cameroon | 168 kg | Mohammed Fethi; Algeria | 168 kg | Zakaria Bertali; Morocco | 155 kg |
| Total | Joël Essama; Cameroon | 303 kg | Mohammed Fethi; Algeria | 303 kg | Zakaria Bertali; Morocco | 286 kg |
+105 kg
| Snatch | Walid Bidani; Algeria | 181 kg | Hamza Sanoune; Algeria | 155 kg | Abdelali Lagsir; Morocco | 130 kg |
| Clean & Jerk | Walid Bidani; Algeria | 210 kg | Hamza Sanoune; Algeria | 185 kg | Abdelali Lagsir; Morocco | 181 kg |
| Total | Walid Bidani; Algeria | 391 kg | Hamza Sanoune; Algeria | 340 kg | Abdelali Lagsir; Morocco | 311 kg |

=== Women ===
| Event | Gold | | Silver | | Bronze | |
48 kg
| Snatch | Roilya Ranaivosoa; Mauritius | 78 kg | Zohra Chihi; Tunisia | 64 kg | Rosina Randafiarison; Madagascar | 62 kg |
| Clean & Jerk | Roilya Ranaivosoa; Mauritius | 102 kg | Zohra Chihi; Tunisia | 80 kg | Monica Uweh; Nigeria | 80 kg |
| Total | Roilya Ranaivosoa; Mauritius | 180 kg | Zohra Chihi; Tunisia | 144 kg | Monica Uweh; Nigeria | 140 kg |
53 kg
| Snatch | Nouha Landoulsi; Tunisia | 73 kg | Fatima Yakubu; Nigeria | 72 kg | Ruth Baffoe; Ghana | 69 kg |
| Clean & Jerk | Nouha Landoulsi; Tunisia | 90 kg | Fatima Yakubu; Nigeria | 86 kg | Ruth Baffoe; Ghana | 82 kg |
| Total | Nouha Landoulsi; Tunisia | 163 kg | Fatima Yakubu; Nigeria | 158 kg | Ruth Baffoe; Ghana | 151 kg |
58 kg
| Snatch | Chinenye Fidelis; Nigeria | 87 kg | Rachael Ekoshoria; Nigeria | 82 kg | Clementina Agricole; Seychelles | 77 kg |
| Clean & Jerk | Chinenye Fidelis; Nigeria | 122 kg | Rachael Ekoshoria; Nigeria | 110 kg | Clementina Agricole; Seychelles | 101 kg |
| Total | Chinenye Fidelis; Nigeria | 209 kg | Rachael Ekoshoria; Nigeria | 192 kg | Clementina Agricole; Seychelles | 178 kg |
63 kg
| Snatch | Olauwatoyin Adesanmi; Nigeria | 100 kg | Vania Ravololoniaina; Madagascar | 81 kg | Ghofrane Belkhir; Tunisia | 80 kg |
| Clean & Jerk | Olauwatoyin Adesanmi; Nigeria | 115 kg | Ghofrane Belkhir; Tunisia | 100 kg | Vania Ravololoniaina; Madagascar | 97 kg |
| Total | Olauwatoyin Adesanmi; Nigeria | 215 kg | Ghofrane Belkhir; Tunisia | 180 kg | Vania Ravololoniaina; Madagascar | 178 kg |
69 kg
| Snatch | Arcangeline Fouodji; Cameroon | 81 kg | Emmanuella Labonne; Mauritius | 80 kg | Ikram Cherara; Algeria | 80 kg |
| Clean & Jerk | Arcangeline Fouodji; Cameroon | 105 kg | Mercy Obiero; Kenya | 105 kg | Ikram Cherara; Algeria | 103 kg |
| Total | Arcangeline Fouodji; Cameroon | 186 kg | Ikram Cherara; Algeria | 183 kg | Mercy Obiero; Kenya | 181 kg |
75 kg
| Snatch | Samar Said; Egypt | 98 kg | Bilikis Otunla; Nigeria | 97 kg | Diane Tiemeni; Cameroon | 80 kg |
| Clean & Jerk | Bilikis Otunla; Nigeria | 125 kg | Samar Said; Egypt | 120 kg | Hortense Nguidjol; Cameroon | 100 kg |
| Total | Bilikis Otunla; Nigeria | 222 kg | Samar Said; Egypt | 218 kg | Bouchra Hirech; Algeria | 179 kg |
+75 kg
| Snatch | Mariam Usman; Nigeria | 120 kg | Yosra Dhieb; Tunisia | 110 kg | Shalinee Valaydon; Mauritius | 96 kg |
| Clean & Jerk | Mariam Usman; Nigeria | 150 kg | Marwa Jelassi; Tunisia | 122 kg | Albertine Um; Cameroon | 116 kg |
| Total | Mariam Usman; Nigeria | 270 kg | Marwa Jelassi; Tunisia | 217 kg | Shalinee Valaydon; Mauritius | 211 kg |

== Participating nations ==
- Algeria (13)
- Central African Republic (3)
- Republic of the Congo (4)
- Cameroon (15)
- Egypt (3)
- Ghana (7)
- Kenya (8)
- Madagascar (7)
- Morocco (13)
- Mauritius (3)
- Nigeria (7)
- Seychelles (3)
- Tunisia (15)
- Democratic Republic of the Congo (8)
- Equatorial Guinea (2)
- Libya (8)
- Sierra Leone (5)
- Uganda (2)
