= Magdeline Moyengwa =

Motswana weightlifter (born 2001)

Personal information
- Born: 31 March 2001 (age 25)

Sport
- Country: Botswana
- Sport: Weightlifting
- Weight class: 59 kg
Medal record
Women's weightlifting
Representing Botswana
African Championships
Bronze medal – third place	2021 Nairobi	59 kg

Magdeline Moyengwa (born 31 March 2001) is a Motswana weightlifter. She is the first female weightlifter from Botswana to represent her country at the World Weightlifting Championships and the Summer Olympics.

== Career ==
In 2019, she represented Botswana at the African Games held in Rabat, Morocco. In that same year, she also competed in the women's 59 kg event at the 2019 World Weightlifting Championships in Pattaya, Thailand.

In 2021, she won the bronze medal in the women's 59 kg event at the African Weightlifting Championships held in Nairobi, Kenya. In July 2021, she represented Botswana at the 2020 Summer Olympics in Tokyo, Japan. She competed in the women's 59 kg event. She lifted 70 kg in the Snatch but she did not register a result in the Clean & Jerk.

== Achievements ==
Year	Venue	Weight	Snatch (kg)				Clean & Jerk (kg)				Total	Rank
Year	Venue	Weight	1	2	3	Rank	1	2	3	Rank	Total	Rank
Summer Olympics
2021	Tokyo, Japan	59 kg	65	~~70~~	70	—N/a	~~80~~	~~80~~	~~80~~	—N/a	—	—
World Championships
2019	Pattaya, Thailand	59 kg	65	~~68~~	~~68~~	36	~~82~~	~~82~~	82	36	147	35
African Championships
2021	Nairobi, Kenya	59 kg	60	~~65~~	~~68~~	5	70	75	~~80~~	3rd place, bronze medalist(s)	135	3rd place, bronze medalist(s)
