= Weightlifting Federation of Africa =

- Sport: Weightlifting
- Abbreviation: WFA
- Founded: 1978
- Affiliation: International Weightlifting Federation
- Regional affiliation: Africa
- Headquarters: Tunis, Tunisia
- President: Khaled Mhalhel
- Secretary: Eshelly Manareddin

Official website
- www.wfa.com.ly

The Weightlifting Federation of Africa was founded in 1978. The federation is the body that governs and oversees weightlifting sports in Africa.

== Events ==
- African Weightlifting Championships From 1979
- African Junior Weightlifting Championships From 1986 or 1995
- African Youth Weightlifting Championships From 2009
