= Samira Ouass =

Moroccan weightlifter (born 1992)

Personal information
- Born: 22 April 1992 (age 34)
- Height: 1.62 m (5 ft 4 in)
- Weight: 74 kg (163 lb)

Sport
- Country: Morocco
- Sport: Weightlifting
- Event: Women's 75 kg
Medal record
Women's weightlifting
Representing Morocco
African Championships
Silver medal – second place	2017 Vacoas	90 kg
Bronze medal – third place	2019 Cairo	81 kg
Bronze medal – third place	2021 Nairobi	87 kg

Samira Ouass (born 22 April 1992) is a Moroccan weightlifter. She competed in the women's 75 kg event at the 2016 Summer Olympics held in Rio de Janeiro, Brazil.

She is also a silver medalist and a two-time bronze medalist at the African Weightlifting Championships.
