= Faris Touairi =

Algerian weightlifter (born 1999)

Personal information
- Born: 1999 (age 26–27)

Sport
- Country: Algeria
- Sport: Weightlifting
- Weight class: 89 kg
Medal record
Men's weightlifting
Representing Algeria
African Championships
Gold medal – first place	2021 Nairobi	89 kg
Bronze medal – third place	2026 Ismailia	94 kg
Mediterranean Games
Gold medal – first place	2026 Taranto	95 kg S
Bronze medal – third place	2022 Oran	89 kg S
Bronze medal – third place	2026 Taranto	95 kg CJ

Faris Touairi (born 1999) is an Algerian weightlifter. He won the gold medal in the men's 89 kg event at the 2021 African Weightlifting Championships held in Nairobi, Kenya. He also set a new African record in the Snatch with a lift of 165 kg.

== Career ==
In 2018, he competed in the men's 77 kg event at the Junior World Weightlifting Championships held in Tashkent, Uzbekistan. He also competed in the men's 81 kg event at the 2019 Junior World Weightlifting Championships held in Suva, Fiji.

In 2021, he won the gold medal in the men's 89 kg event at the African Weightlifting Championships held in Nairobi, Kenya. He also set a new African record in the Snatch with a lift of 165 kg. He competed in the men's 89 kg event at the 2021 World Weightlifting Championships held in Tashkent, Uzbekistan. He won the bronze medal in the men's 89 kg Snatch event at the 2022 Mediterranean Games held in Oran, Algeria.

== Achievements ==
Year	Venue	Weight	Snatch (kg)				Clean & Jerk (kg)				Total	Rank
Year	Venue	Weight	1	2	3	Rank	1	2	3	Rank	Total	Rank
World Championships
2021	Tashkent, Uzbekistan	89 kg	155	162	~~168~~	7	~~190~~	~~190~~	~~191~~	—	—	—
African Championships
2021	Nairobi, Kenya	89 kg	140	150	165	1st place, gold medalist(s)	170	—	—	1st place, gold medalist(s)	335	1st place, gold medalist(s)
Mediterranean Games
2022	Oran, Algeria	89 kg	161	~~166~~	~~166~~	3rd place, bronze medalist(s)	—	—	—	—	—N/a	—N/a
