= Ramzi Bahloul =

Tunisian weightlifter (born 1989)

Personal information
- Born: 18 October 1989 (age 36)

Sport
- Country: Tunisia
- Sport: Weightlifting
Medal record
Men's weightlifting
Representing Tunisia
African Championships
Gold medal – first place	2016 Yaoundé	77 kg
Gold medal – first place	2021 Nairobi	81 kg
Silver medal – second place	2019 Cairo	81 kg

Ramzi Bahloul (born 18 October 1989) is a Tunisian weightlifter. He represented Tunisia at the 2020 Summer Olympics in Tokyo, Japan. He competed in the men's 81 kg event.

At the 2018 Mediterranean Games held in Tarragona, Catalonia, Spain, he won the silver medal in the 85 kg Clean & Jerk event.

In 2020, he finished in 5th place in the men's 81 kg event at the Roma 2020 World Cup in Rome, Italy.
