= Bouchra Hirech =

Algerian weightlifter (born 2000)

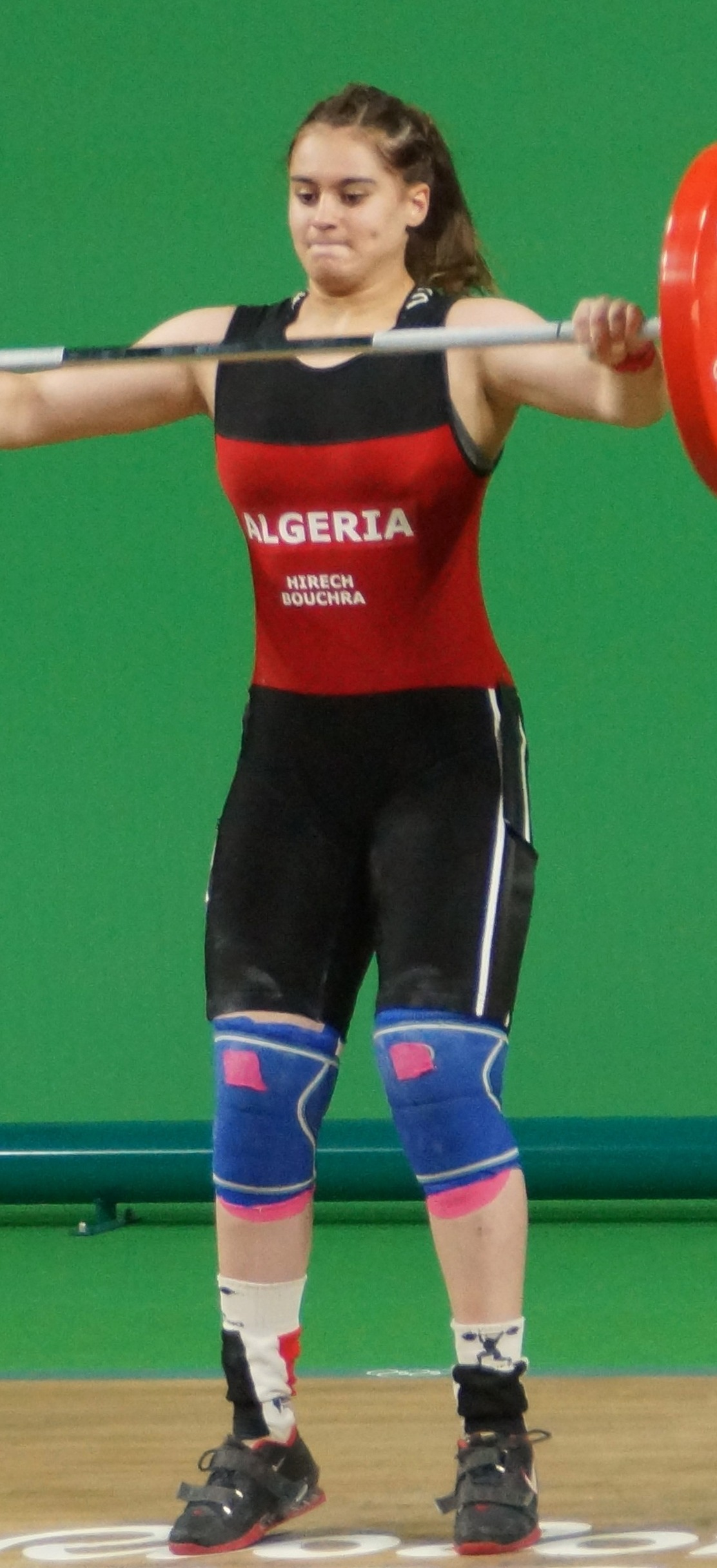
- Hirech at the 2016 Olympics

Personal information
- Full name: Bouchra Fatima Zohra Hirech
- Born: 22 August 2000 (age 25)
- Height: 170 cm (5 ft 7 in)
- Weight: 80 kg (176 lb)

Sport
- Sport: Weightlifting
- Club: ASPC Mostaganem
- Coached by: Azzeddine Besbes
Medal record
Representing Algeria
African Weightlifting Championships
Bronze medal – third place	2016 Yaoundé	-75 kg
Bronze medal – third place	2019 Cairo	-81 kg

Bouchra Fatima Zohra Hirech (born 22 August 2000) is an Algerian weightlifter.

== Career ==
Hirech studied at the Mostaganem School. Aged 15, she won a bronze medal in the 75 kg division at the 2016 African Weightlifting Championships. At the 2016 Olympics she competed in the +75 kg category and placed last.
