= 2017 African Weightlifting Championships =

2017 African Championships
- Host city: Vacoas, Mauritius
- Dates: July 10 – 20

The 2017 African Weightlifting Championships was held in Vacoas, Mauritius between July 10 and July 20, 2017.

== Medal summary ==
Results are obtained from the IWF website.

=== Men ===
| Event | Gold | | Silver | | Bronze | |
56 kg
| Snatch | Amine Bouhijbha; Tunisia | 110 kg | Eric Andriantsitohaina; Madagascar | 101 kg | Issam Harfi; Morocco | 94 kg |
| Clean & Jerk | Amine Bouhijbha; Tunisia | 134 kg | Eric Andriantsitohaina; Madagascar | 133 kg | Riad Feni; Algeria | 115 kg |
| Total | Amine Bouhijbha; Tunisia | 244 kg | Eric Andriantsitohaina; Madagascar | 234 kg | Riad Feni; Algeria | 206 kg |
62 kg
| Snatch | Tojonirina Andriantsitohaina; Madagascar | 122 kg | Faouzi Kraydi; Tunisia | 121 kg | Marc Jonathan Coret; Mauritius | 107 kg |
| Clean & Jerk | Tojonirina Andriantsitohaina; Madagascar | 150 kg | Faouzi Kraydi; Tunisia | 146 kg | Marc Jonathan Coret; Mauritius | 135 kg |
| Total | Tojonirina Andriantsitohaina; Madagascar | 272 kg | Faouzi Kraydi; Tunisia | 267 kg | Marc Jonathan Coret; Mauritius | 242 kg |
69 kg
| Snatch | Karem Ben Hnia; Tunisia | 147 kg | Nafaa Sariak; Algeria | 130 kg | Ostile Greg Shushu; South Africa | 117 kg |
| Clean & Jerk | Karem Ben Hnia; Tunisia | 180 kg | Nafaa Sariak; Algeria | 161 kg | Ostile Greg Shushu; South Africa | 150 kg |
| Total | Karem Ben Hnia; Tunisia | 327 kg | Nafaa Sariak; Algeria | 291 kg | Ostile Greg Shushu; South Africa | 267 kg |
77 kg
| Snatch | Elhani Shredi; Libya | 146 kg | Rami Bahloul; Tunisia | 142 kg | Smail Choukal; Algeria | 138 kg |
| Clean & Jerk | Rami Bahloul; Tunisia | 174 kg | Elhani Shredi; Libya | 173 kg | Smail Choukal; Algeria | 157 kg |
| Total | Elhani Shredi; Libya | 319 kg | Rami Bahloul; Tunisia | 316 kg | Smail Choukal; Algeria | 295 kg |
85 kg
| Snatch | Mohamed Ihab; Egypt | 158 kg | Ramzi Bahloul; Tunisia | 147 kg | Wajih Tlili; Tunisia | 146 kg |
| Clean & Jerk | Mohamed Ihab; Egypt | 190 kg | Ameur Messaoudi; Algeria | 170 kg | Wajih Tlili; Tunisia | 167 kg |
| Total | Mohamed Ihab; Egypt | 348 kg | Wajih Tlili; Tunisia | 313 kg | Ameur Messaoudi; Algeria | 310 kg |
94 kg
| Snatch | Ragab Abdelhay; Egypt | 167 kg | Saddam Messaoui; Algeria | 150 kg | Hicham Moum; Morocco | 141 kg |
| Clean & Jerk | Ragab Abdelhay; Egypt | 195 kg | Saddam Messaoui; Algeria | 180 kg | Achraf Maatoug; Tunisia | 175 kg |
| Total | Ragab Abdelhay; Egypt | 362 kg | Saddam Messaoui; Algeria | 330 kg | Hicham Moum; Morocco | 315 kg |
105 kg
| Snatch | Aymen Touairi; Algeria | 150 kg | Mohammed Fethi; Algeria | 141 kg | Zakaria Bertali; Morocco | 130 kg |
| Clean & Jerk | Aymen Touairi; Algeria | 180 kg | Mohammed Fethi; Algeria | 175 kg | Zakaria Bertali; Morocco | 150 kg |
| Total | Aymen Touairi; Algeria | 330 kg | Mohammed Fethi; Algeria | 316 kg | Zakaria Bertali; Morocco | 280 kg |
+105 kg
| Snatch | Ahmed Mohamed; Egypt | 178 kg | Alvin Joroon; Mauritius | 92 kg | | |
| Clean & Jerk | Ahmed Mohamed; Egypt | 235 kg | Walid Bidani; Algeria | 180 kg | Alvin Joroon; Mauritius | 135 kg |
| Total | Ahmed Mohamed; Egypt | 413 kg | Alvin Joroon; Mauritius | 227 kg | | |

=== Women ===
| Event | Gold | | Silver | | Bronze | |
48 kg
| Snatch | Roilya Ranaivosoa; Mauritius | 76 kg | Rosina Randafiarison; Madagascar | 60 kg | | |
| Clean & Jerk | Roilya Ranaivosoa; Mauritius | 95 kg | Rosina Randafiarison; Madagascar | 70 kg | | |
| Total | Roilya Ranaivosoa; Mauritius | 171 kg | Rosina Randafiarison; Madagascar | 130 kg | | |
53 kg
| Snatch | Nouha Landoulsi; Tunisia | 88 kg | Fatima Zohra Laghouati; Algeria | 66 kg | Anita Alinrosoa; Ghana | 60 kg |
| Clean & Jerk | Nouha Landoulsi; Tunisia | 106 kg | Fatima Zohra Laghouati; Algeria | 78 kg | Anita Alinrosoa; Ghana | 76 kg |
| Total | Nouha Landoulsi; Tunisia | 194 kg | Fatima Zohra Laghouati; Algeria | 144 kg | Anita Alinrosoa; Ghana | 136 kg |
58 kg
| Snatch | Johanni Taljaard; South Africa | 72 kg | Ketty Lent; Mauritius | 70 kg | Sitrakiniaina Randrianandrasana; Madagascar | 65 kg |
| Clean & Jerk | Johanni Taljaard; South Africa | 93 kg | Ketty Lent; Mauritius | 87 kg | Sitrakiniaina Randrianandrasana; Madagascar | 82 kg |
| Total | Johanni Taljaard; South Africa | 165 kg | Ketty Lent; Mauritius | 157 kg | Sitrakiniaina Randrianandrasana; Madagascar | 147 kg |
63 kg
| Snatch | Clementina Agricole; Seychelles | 86 kg | Ghofrane Belkhir; Tunisia | 85 kg | Elysa V.Ravololoniaina; Madagascar | 77 kg |
| Clean & Jerk | Clementina Agricole; Seychelles | 107 kg | Ghofrane Belkhir; Tunisia | 106 kg | Yosra Abidi; Tunisia | 105 kg |
| Total | Clementina Agricole; Seychelles | 193 kg | Ghofrane Belkhir; Tunisia | 191 kg | Yosra Abidi; Tunisia | 181 kg |
69 kg
| Snatch | Ghada Hassine; Tunisia | 92 kg | Emmanuella Labonne; Mauritius | 91 kg | Ikram Cherara; Algeria | 70 kg |
| Clean & Jerk | Ghada Hassine; Tunisia | 115 kg | Emmanuella Labonne; Mauritius | 100 kg | Ikram Cherara; Algeria | 95 kg |
| Total | Ghada Hassine; Tunisia | 207 kg | Emmanuella Labonne; Mauritius | 191 kg | Ikram Cherara; Algeria | 165 kg |
75 kg
| Snatch | Maghnia Hammadi; Algeria | 74 kg | Alison Sunee; Mauritius | 71 kg | Brenda Lozaique; Seychelles | 55 kg |
| Clean & Jerk | Maghnia Hammadi; Algeria | 95 kg | Alison Sunee; Mauritius | 80 kg | Brenda Lozaique; Seychelles | 70 kg |
| Total | Maghnia Hammadi; Algeria | 169 kg | Alison Sunee; Mauritius | 151 kg | Brenda Lozaique; Seychelles | 125 kg |
90 kg
| Snatch | Dina Elsayed; Egypt | 95 kg | Samira Ouass; Morocco | 72 kg | Wendy Iram; Mauritius | 40 kg |
| Clean & Jerk | Dina Elsayed; Egypt | 120 kg | Samira Ouass; Morocco | 98 kg | Wendy Iram; Mauritius | 55 kg |
| Total | Dina Elsayed; Egypt | 215 kg | Samira Ouass; Morocco | 170 kg | Wendy Iram; Mauritius | 95 kg |
+90 kg
| Snatch | Shaimaa Khalaf; Egypt | 117 kg | Shalinee Valaydon; Mauritius | 97 kg | Marwa Jlassi; Tunisia | 96 kg |
| Clean & Jerk | Shaimaa Khalaf; Egypt | 158 kg | Marwa Jlassi; Tunisia | 125 kg | Shalinee Valaydon; Mauritius | 120 kg |
| Total | Shaimaa Khalaf; Egypt | 275 kg | Marwa Jlassi; Tunisia | 221 kg | Shalinee Valaydon; Mauritius | 217 kg |

== Medal table ==
| Rank | Nation | Gold | Silver | Bronze | Total |
|---|---|---|---|---|---|
| 1 | Egypt (EGY) | 15 | 0 | 0 | 15 |
| 2 | Tunisia (TUN) | 13 | 12 | 6 | 31 |
| 3 | Algeria (ALG) | 6 | 14 | 9 | 29 |
| 4 | Mauritius (MRI) | 3 | 12 | 9 | 24 |
| 5 | Madagascar (MAD) | 3 | 6 | 4 | 13 |
| 6 | Seychelles (SEY) | 3 | 0 | 3 | 6 |
| 6 | South Africa (RSA) | 3 | 0 | 3 | 6 |
| 8 | Libya (LBA) | 2 | 1 | 0 | 3 |
| 9 | Morocco (MAR) | 0 | 3 | 6 | 9 |
| 10 | Ghana (GHA) | 0 | 0 | 3 | 3 |
| Totals (10 entries) | | 48 | 48 | 43 | 139 |

== Participating nations ==
- Algeria (12)
- Botswana (2)
- Republic of the Congo (1)
- Democratic Republic of the Congo (1)
- Egypt (6)
- Libya (1)
- Lesotho (2)
- Madagascar (9)
- Morocco (11)
- Mauritius (16)
- South Africa (4)
- Seychelles (5)
- Tunisia (13)
- Uganda (1)
