= Nafaa Sariak =

Algerian weightlifter (born 1994)

Personal information
- Born: 29 November 1994 (age 31)

Sport
- Country: Algeria
- Sport: Weightlifting
Medal record
Men's weightlifting
Representing Algeria
African Games
Bronze medal – third place	2019 Rabat	73 kg
African Championships
Silver medal – second place	2017 Vacoas	69 kg
Silver medal – second place	2021 Nairobi	73 kg

Nafaa Sariak (born 29 November 1994) is an Algerian weightlifter. He represented Algeria at the 2019 African Games held in Rabat, Morocco and he won the bronze medal in the men's 73 kg event.
