= Taiwo Liadi =

Nigerian weightlifter (born 2002)

Personal information
- Born: 14 June 2002 (age 24)

Sport
- Country: Nigeria
- Sport: Weightlifting
Medal record
Women's weightlifting
Representing Nigeria
African Championships
| Gold medal – first place | 2026 Ismailia | 77 kg |
Commonwealth Games
| Silver medal – second place | 2022 Birmingham | 76 kg |

Liadi Taiwo (born 14 June 2002) is a Nigerian weightlifter, who competes in the 76 kg category and represents Nigeria at international competitions. In August 2022, she won silver at the 2022 Commonwealth Games. She also set a new junior Commonwealth record in the Clean & Jerk.
