= Abderrahim Moum =

Moroccan weightlifter

Personal information
- Nationality: Morocco
- Born: 18 September 2000 (age 24); Morocco
- Height: 172 cm (5 ft 8 in)
- Weight: 73 kg (161 lb)

Sport
- Sport: Fencing

Abderrahim Moum (born 18 September 2000) is a Moroccan weightlifter.

== Career ==
Moum was a three-time bronze medalist in the under 73 kg category at the 2021 African Weightlifting Championships in Nairobi. He represented Morocco at the 2020 Summer Olympics in Tokyo, competing in the Men's 73kg event and ranking 14th.
