= Augustina Nkem Nwaokolo =

Nigerian weightlifter (born 1992)

Augustina Nwaokolo
Personal information
- Full name: Augustina Nkem Nwaokolo
- Nationality: Nigerian
- Born: 12 December 1992 (age 33) Lagos, Nigeria
- Weight: 63 kg (139 lb)

Sport
- Sport: Women's 48 kg
- Event: 48 kg
Medal record
Representing Nigeria
Women's weightlifting
Commonwealth Games
Gold medal – first place	2010 Delhi	Women's 48 kg
- Updated on May 2020

Augustina Nwaokolo (born 12 December 1992) is a Nigerian weightlifter. She competed in the women's 48 kg event at the 2014 Commonwealth Games where she won a gold medal. Augustina Nwaokolo won the first gold medal of the games which see her setting a new Games record of 175 kg after lifting 77 kg in the snatch and 98 kg in the clean and jerk. This saw her became the first Nigerian teenage weightlifter to achieve that in an International competitions and the Commonwealth Games. The event took place at the Jawaharlal Nehru Stadium.

== Competitions participated ==
- 2010 Commonwealth Games

Weightlifting - 48 kg - Women Gold 175.0 (GR)

- 2014 Commonwealth Games

Weightlifting - --8 kg - Women

- 2018 Commonwealth Games

Weightlifting - --kg - Women
