= Weightlifting at the 2022 Mediterranean Games =

Weightlifting competition

- Venue: EMEC Hall
- Dates: 1–4 July
- Competitors: 68 from 17 nations

The weightlifting event at the 2022 Mediterranean Games was held in Oran, Algeria, from 1 to 4 July 2022.

== Medal table ==
* Host nation (Algeria)

Rank	Nation	Gold	Silver	Bronze	Total
1	Italy	6	1	2	9
2	Tunisia	3	1	3	7
3	Egypt	2	4	4	10
4	Turkey	2	2	4	8
5	Spain	1	3	0	4
6	Algeria*	1	2	2	5
7	Syria	1	1	0	2
8	Albania	0	1	0	1
8	Greece	0	1	0	1
10	France	0	0	1	1
Totals (10 entries)		16	16	16	48

== Medal summary ==
=== Men's events ===
Event		Gold		Silver		Bronze	
– 61 kg	Snatch	Ferdi Hardal (TUR)	124 kg	Ahmed Eltamadi (EGY)	120 kg	Amine Bouhijbha (TUN)	116 kg
– 61 kg	Clean & Jerk	Ferdi Hardal (TUR)	153 kg	Ahmed Eltamadi (EGY)	152 kg	Amine Bouhijbha (TUN)	150 kg
– 73 kg	Snatch	Mirko Zanni (ITA)	150 kg	Erkand Qerimaj (ALB)	149 kg	Karem Ben Hnia (TUN)	147 kg
– 73 kg	Clean & Jerk	Karem Ben Hnia (TUN)	185 kg	Muhammed Furkan Özbek (TUR)	184 kg	Mirko Zanni (ITA)	177 kg
– 89 kg	Snatch	Antonino Pizzolato (ITA)	172 kg	Karim Abokahla (EGY)	171 kg	Faris Touairi (ALG)	161 kg
– 89 kg	Clean & Jerk	Antonino Pizzolato (ITA)	213 kg	Karim Abokahla (EGY)	212 kg	Brandon Vautard (FRA)	192 kg
– 102 kg	Snatch	Marcos Ruiz (ESP)	175 kg	Aymen Bacha (TUN)	174 kg	Cristiano Ficco (ITA)	164 kg
– 102 kg	Clean & Jerk	Aymen Bacha (TUN)	210 kg	Marcos Ruiz (ESP)	208 kg	Ahmed Ali (EGY)	208 kg
+ 102 kg	Snatch	Walid Bidani (ALG)	202 kg	Man Asaad (SYR)	197 kg	Ahmed Gaber (EGY)	170 kg
+ 102 kg	Clean & Jerk	Man Asaad (SYR)	247 kg	Walid Bidani (ALG)	235 kg	Ahmed Gaber (EGY)	231 kg

=== Women events ===
Event		Gold		Silver		Bronze	
– 49 kg	Snatch	Giulia Imperio (ITA)	83 kg	Atenery Hernández (ESP)	78 kg	Şaziye Erdoğan (TUR)	75 kg
– 49 kg	Clean & Jerk	Giulia Imperio (ITA)	97 kg	Atenery Hernández (ESP)	96 kg	Şaziye Erdoğan (TUR)	95 kg
– 59 kg	Snatch	Lucrezia Magistris (ITA)	95 kg	Sofia Georgopoulou (GRE)	94 kg	Cansel Özkan (TUR)	92 kg
– 59 kg	Clean & Jerk	Ghofrane Belkhir (TUN)	115 kg	Lucrezia Magistris (ITA)	114 kg	Basma Ibrahim (EGY)	113 kg
– 71 kg	Snatch	Neama Said (EGY)	101 kg	Maghnia Hammadi (ALG)	100 kg	Nuray Güngör (TUR)	99 kg
– 71 kg	Clean & Jerk	Neama Said (EGY)	125 kg	Nuray Güngör (TUR)	122 kg	Maghnia Hammadi (ALG)	121 kg

== Men's results ==
=== Men's 61 kg ===
Athlete	Group	Snatch (kg)				Clean & Jerk (kg)			
Athlete	Group	1	2	3	Rank	1	2	3	Rank
Ferdi Hardal (TUR)	A	124	128	—	1st place, gold medalist(s)	147	151	153	1st place, gold medalist(s)
Ahmed Eltamadi (EGY)	A	117	120	~~125~~	2nd place, silver medalist(s)	143	150	152	2nd place, silver medalist(s)
Amine Bouhijbha (TUN)	A	116	~~118~~	—	3rd place, bronze medalist(s)	142	~~145~~	150	3rd place, bronze medalist(s)
Josué Brachi (ESP)	A	111	116	~~118~~	4	~~135~~	139	~~144~~	4
Stevan Vladisavljev (SRB)	A	105	~~110~~	110	5	130	~~136~~	—	6
Faris Durak (BIH)	A	~~86~~	~~86~~	~~86~~	—	102	~~107~~	—	7
Abdelkader Ainouazane (ALG)	A	~~115~~	~~115~~	~~118~~	—	135	~~143~~	~~146~~	5

=== Men's 73 kg ===
Athlete	Group	Snatch (kg)				Clean & Jerk (kg)			
Athlete	Group	1	2	3	Rank	1	2	3	Rank
Mirko Zanni (ITA)	A	147	~~149~~	150	1st place, gold medalist(s)	~~177~~	177	—	3rd place, bronze medalist(s)
Erkand Qerimaj (ALB)	A	~~148~~	~~148~~	149	2nd place, silver medalist(s)	—	—	—	—
Karem Ben Hnia (TUN)	A	~~147~~	147	~~149~~	3rd place, bronze medalist(s)	180	182	185	1st place, gold medalist(s)
Ahmed Mohamed (EGY)	A	~~146~~	146	~~149~~	4	~~176~~	~~177~~	~~178~~	—
Muhammed Furkan Özbek (TUR)	A	~~145~~	145	~~148~~	5	~~181~~	181	184	2nd place, silver medalist(s)
Samir Farfjallah (ALG)	A	136	141	~~148~~	6	171	~~178~~	~~178~~	4
David Sánchez (ESP)	A	135	140	~~143~~	7	165	~~170~~	—	6
Ahsaan Shabi (LBA)	A	130	136	~~141~~	8	160	~~170~~	170	5
Bernardin Matam (FRA)	A	Did not start							

=== Men's 89 kg ===
Athlete	Group	Snatch (kg)				Clean & Jerk (kg)			
Athlete	Group	1	2	3	Rank	1	2	3	Rank
Antonino Pizzolato (ITA)	A	170	172	—	1st place, gold medalist(s)	~~210~~	210	213	1st place, gold medalist(s)
Karim Abokahla (EGY)	A	160	165	171	2nd place, silver medalist(s)	202	212	~~214~~	2nd place, silver medalist(s)
Faris Touairi (ALG)	A	161	~~166~~	~~166~~	3rd place, bronze medalist(s)	—	—	—	—
Theodoros Iakovidis (GRE)	A	152	157	~~161~~	4	183	~~191~~	~~191~~	6
Celil Erdoğdu (TUR)	A	153	~~158~~	~~158~~	5	~~185~~	~~191~~	~~191~~	—
Antonis Martasidis (CYP)	A	145	150	~~153~~	6	185	~~191~~	191	4
Omar Al-Ajeemi (LBA)	A	138	144	148	7	175	~~183~~	185	5
Martín Liste (ESP)	A	~~145~~	145	~~151~~	8	~~175~~	~~175~~	175	7
Brandon Vautard (FRA)	A	135	~~140~~	140	9	190	192	~~200~~	3rd place, bronze medalist(s)

=== Men's 102 kg ===
Athlete	Group	Snatch (kg)				Clean & Jerk (kg)			
Athlete	Group	1	2	3	Rank	1	2	3	Rank
Marcos Ruiz (ESP)	A	168	172	175	1st place, gold medalist(s)	200	205	208	2nd place, silver medalist(s)
Aymen Bacha (TUN)	A	167	~~172~~	174	2nd place, silver medalist(s)	~~205~~	206	210	1st place, gold medalist(s)
Cristiano Ficco (ITA)	A	161	164	~~168~~	3rd place, bronze medalist(s)	201	~~206~~	207	4
Aymen Touairi (ALG)	A	~~162~~	162	~~169~~	4	201	206	~~209~~	5
Ahmed Ali (EGY)	A	160	~~168~~	~~168~~	5	~~205~~	~~206~~	208	3rd place, bronze medalist(s)
Romain Imadouchène (FRA)	A	160	~~165~~	~~167~~	6	~~205~~	~~206~~	~~209~~	—
Ahmed Abuzriba (LBA)	A	158	~~164~~	~~169~~	7	180	190	~~200~~	6
Onur Demirci (TUR)	A	~~155~~	155	~~163~~	8	~~196~~	~~196~~	~~196~~	—
Efstathios Stroumpis (GRE)	A	145	150	~~155~~	9	175	~~181~~	~~185~~	7
Dino Smajić (BIH)	A	120	130	140	10	150	160	165	9
Jure Škedelj (SLO)	A	130	~~135~~	135	11	~~165~~	167	~~170~~	8

=== Men's +102 kg ===
Athlete	Group	Snatch (kg)				Clean & Jerk (kg)			
Athlete	Group	1	2	3	Rank	1	2	3	Rank
Walid Bidani (ALG)	A	190	196	202	1st place, gold medalist(s)	225	235	~~243~~	2nd place, silver medalist(s)
Man Asaad (SYR)	A	191	197	~~203~~	2nd place, silver medalist(s)	232	242	247	1st place, gold medalist(s)
Ahmed Gaber (EGY)	A	170	~~180~~	~~180~~	3rd place, bronze medalist(s)	220	231	~~236~~	3rd place, bronze medalist(s)
Ali Oflaz (TUR)	A	150	152	~~160~~	4	186	~~200~~	~~200~~	4
Albert Meta (ALB)	A	142	147	151	5	172	180	~~185~~	5

== Women's results ==
=== Women's 49 kg ===
Athlete	Group	Snatch (kg)				Clean & Jerk (kg)				Total
Athlete	Group	1	2	3	Rank	1	2	3	Rank	Rank
Giulia Imperio (ITA)	A	77	79	83	1st place, gold medalist(s)	95	97	~~102~~	1st place, gold medalist(s)	180
Atenery Hernández (ESP)	A	76	78	~~80~~	2nd place, silver medalist(s)	93	96	~~98~~	2nd place, silver medalist(s)	174
Şaziye Erdoğan (TUR)	A	73	75	~~79~~	3rd place, bronze medalist(s)	92	95	~~97~~	3rd place, bronze medalist(s)	170
Maha Fajreslam (MAR)	A	63	~~66~~	~~66~~	4	77	~~82~~	~~83~~	4	140
Nadia Katbi (ALG)	A	52	~~55~~	57	5	65	~~70~~	~~70~~	5	122
Zahra Chihi (TUN)	A	~~74~~	—	—	—	—	—	—	—	

=== Women's 59 kg ===
Athlete	Group	Snatch (kg)				Clean & Jerk (kg)				Total
Athlete	Group	1	2	3	Rank	1	2	3	Rank	Rank
Lucrezia Magistris (ITA)	A	90	93	95	1st place, gold medalist(s)	111	114	~~118~~	2nd place, silver medalist(s)	209
Ghofrane Belkhir (TUN)	A	~~91~~	~~91~~	91	4	112	115	—	1st place, gold medalist(s)	206
Sofia Georgopoulou (GRE)	A	89	92	94	2nd place, silver medalist(s)	108	~~113~~	~~115~~	5	203
Basma Ibrahim (EGY)	A	85	88	~~91~~	5	110	113	~~116~~	3rd place, bronze medalist(s)	201
Cansel Özkan (TUR)	A	85	90	92	3rd place, bronze medalist(s)	106	~~112~~	—	6	198
Mouna Skandi (ESP)	A	82	~~84~~	~~84~~	6	107	111	~~113~~	4	193
Garance Rigaud (FRA)	A	75	80	82	7	90	95	~~100~~	8	177
Nastasja Štesl (SLO)	A	73	~~76~~	77	8	91	95	~~100~~	9	172
Fatima Zohra Laghouati (ALG)	A	76	~~80~~	~~81~~	9	95	100	~~103~~	7	176

=== Women's 71 kg ===
Athlete	Group	Snatch (kg)				Clean & Jerk (kg)				Total(Kg)
Athlete	Group	1	2	3	Rank	1	2	3	Rank	Rank
Neama Said (EGY)	A	~~100~~	~~101~~	101	1st place, gold medalist(s)	121	125	—	1st place, gold medalist(s)	226
Maghnia Hammadi (ALG)	A	91	96	100	2nd place, silver medalist(s)	117	121	~~127~~	3rd place, bronze medalist(s)	221
Nuray Güngör (TUR)	A	95	99	~~101~~	3rd place, bronze medalist(s)	118	~~122~~	122	2nd place, silver medalist(s)	221
Ilia Hernández (ESP)	A	~~90~~	~~90~~	92	6	118	121	~~123~~	4	213
Dora Tchakounté (FRA)	A	92	97	~~101~~	4	110	114	~~119~~	8	211
Roufida Fathi (EGY)	A	88	91	~~94~~	7	118	~~122~~	~~122~~	5	209
Vicky Graillot (FRA)	A	~~88~~	88	~~91~~	9	~~113~~	~~113~~	114	9	202
Eleni Revenikioti (GRE)	A	83	~~86~~	~~86~~	13	110	114	116	6	199
Carlotta Brunelli (ITA)	A	~~90~~	90	93	5	105	~~111~~	~~111~~	11	198
Mahassen Fattouh (LBN)	A	88	~~93~~	~~98~~	8	~~110~~	110	~~116~~	10	198
Jawaher Gesmi (TUN)	A	80	84	~~86~~	12	114	~~118~~	~~119~~	7	198
Sonja Bjelić (SRB)	A	~~83~~	85	~~89~~	10	95	100	~~103~~	12	185
Andreana El Ton (LBN)	A	~~85~~	~~85~~	85	11	~~103~~	~~105~~	~~107~~	—	-
