= 2019 African Weightlifting Championships =

International weightlifting competition

2019 African Championships
- Host city: Cairo, Egypt
- Dates: 25–29 April

The 2019 African Weightlifting Championships was held in Cairo, Egypt from 25 to 29 April 2019. It was the 29th men's and 18th women's championship.

== Medal summary ==
=== Men ===
Event	Gold		Silver		Bronze	
55 kg
Snatch	Eric Andriantsitohaina; Madagascar	102 kg	Issam Harfi; Morocco	90 kg		
Clean & Jerk	Eric Andriantsitohaina; Madagascar	120 kg	Issam Harfi; Morocco	100 kg		
Total	Eric Andriantsitohaina; Madagascar	222 kg	Issam Harfi; Morocco	190 kg		
61 kg
Snatch	Amine Bouhijbha; Tunisia	116 kg	Abdullah Bousheehah; Libya	108 kg	Mohamed Aziz Belhaj; Tunisia	102 kg
Clean & Jerk	Amine Bouhijbha; Tunisia	142 kg	Abdullah Bousheehah; Libya	136 kg	Mouhcine Mazozi; Morocco	130 kg
Total	Amine Bouhijbha; Tunisia	258 kg	Abdullah Bousheehah; Libya	244 kg	Mohamed Aziz Belhaj; Tunisia	227 kg
67 kg
Snatch	Ahmed Saad; Egypt	134 kg	Tojonirina Andriantsitohaina; Madagascar	133 kg	Ahsaan Shabi; Libya	126 kg
Clean & Jerk	Ahmed Saad; Egypt	168 kg AF	Tojonirina Andriantsitohaina; Madagascar	167 kg	Ahsaan Shabi; Libya	155 kg
Total	Ahmed Saad; Egypt	302 kg	Tojonirina Andriantsitohaina; Madagascar	300 kg	Ahsaan Shabi; Libya	281 kg
73 kg
Snatch	Karem Ben Hnia; Tunisia	152 kg AF	Moustafa Wahid; Egypt	145 kg	Maraj Tubal; Libya	141 kg
Clean & Jerk	Karem Ben Hnia; Tunisia	186 kg	Moustafa Wahid; Egypt	185 kg	Nafaa Seriak; Algeria	167 kg
Total	Karem Ben Hnia; Tunisia	338 kg AF	Moustafa Wahid; Egypt	330 kg	Maraj Tubal; Libya	307 kg
81 kg
Snatch	Mohamed Ihab; Egypt	160 kg	Ramzi Bahloul; Tunisia	151 kg	Ahmed Adel; Egypt	144 kg
Clean & Jerk	Mohamed Ihab; Egypt	191 kg	Ahmed Adel; Egypt	185 kg	Ramzi Bahloul; Tunisia	180 kg
Total	Mohamed Ihab; Egypt	351 kg	Ramzi Bahloul; Tunisia	331 kg	Ahmed Adel; Egypt	329 kg
89 kg
Snatch	Ahmed Sayed Ali; Egypt	163 kg AF	Wajih Tlili; Tunisia	149 kg	Christian Amoah; Ghana	148 kg
Clean & Jerk	Ahmed Sayed Ali; Egypt	200 kg AF	Rami Bahloul; Tunisia	175 kg	Ahmed Abu Zriba; Libya	174 kg
Total	Ahmed Sayed Ali; Egypt	363 kg AF	Wajih Tlili; Tunisia	322 kg	Christian Amoah; Ghana	320 kg
96 kg
Snatch	Mohamed Selim; Egypt	170 kg AF	Ragab Abdelhay; Egypt	161 kg	Saddam Messaoui; Algeria	161 kg
Clean & Jerk	Ragab Abdelhay; Egypt	201 kg	Mohamed Selim; Egypt	200 kg	Saddam Messaoui; Algeria	193 kg
Total	Mohamed Selim; Egypt	370 kg	Ragab Abdelhay; Egypt	362 kg	Saddam Messaoui; Algeria	354 kg
102 kg
Snatch	Badreddine Ezzouhari; Morocco	123 kg				
Clean & Jerk	Badreddine Ezzouhari; Morocco	145 kg				
Total	Badreddine Ezzouhari; Morocco	268 kg				
109 kg
Snatch	Aymen Bacha; Tunisia	173 kg	Gaber Mohamed; Egypt	165 kg	Mohamed Mohamed; Egypt	160 kg
Clean & Jerk	Mohamed Mohamed; Egypt	207 kg	Gaber Mohamed; Egypt	202 kg	Junior Ngadja Nyabeyeu; Cameroon	200 kg
Total	Gaber Mohamed; Egypt	367 kg	Mohamed Mohamed; Egypt	367 kg	Aymen Bacha; Tunisia	366 kg
+109 kg
Snatch	Walid Bidani; Algeria	187 kg	Ahmed Gaber; Egypt	175 kg	Zakaria Bertali; Morocco	130 kg
Clean & Jerk	Ahmed Gaber; Egypt	230 kg AF	Walid Bidani; Algeria	226 kg	Zakaria Bertali; Morocco	160 kg
Total	Walid Bidani; Algeria	413 kg	Ahmed Gaber; Egypt	405 kg	Zakaria Bertali; Morocco	290 kg

=== Women ===
Event	Gold		Silver		Bronze	
45 kg
Snatch	Rosina Randafiarison; Madagascar	70 kg AF	Maha Fajreslam; Morocco	50 kg		
Clean & Jerk	Rosina Randafiarison; Madagascar	80 kg	Maha Fajreslam; Morocco	62 kg		
Total	Rosina Randafiarison; Madagascar	150 kg	Maha Fajreslam; Morocco	112 kg		
49 kg
Snatch	Heba Saleh; Egypt	73 kg	Roilya Ranaivosoa; Mauritius	71 kg	Zohra Chihi; Tunisia	71 kg
Clean & Jerk	Heba Saleh; Egypt	95 kg	Roilya Ranaivosoa; Mauritius	93 kg	Yosra Ben Aissa; Tunisia	73 kg
Total	Heba Saleh; Egypt	168 kg	Roilya Ranaivosoa; Mauritius	164 kg	Winnifred Ntumi; Ghana	124 kg
55 kg
Snatch	Chika Amalaha; Nigeria	95 kg	Nouha Landoulsi; Tunisia	92 kg	Basma Ibrahim; Egypt	85 kg
Clean & Jerk	Chika Amalaha; Nigeria	110 kg	Nouha Landoulsi; Tunisia	107 kg	Basma Ibrahim; Egypt	100 kg
Total	Chika Amalaha; Nigeria	205 kg	Nouha Landoulsi; Tunisia	199 kg	Basma Ibrahim; Egypt	185 kg
59 kg
Snatch	Chinenye Fidelis; Nigeria	88 kg	Johanni Taljaard; South Africa	83 kg	Maryem Nada; Algeria	70 kg
Clean & Jerk	Chinenye Fidelis; Nigeria	115 kg	Johanni Taljaard; South Africa	102 kg	Maryem Nada; Algeria	90 kg
Total	Chinenye Fidelis; Nigeria	203 kg	Johanni Taljaard; South Africa	185 kg	Maryem Nada; Algeria	160 kg
64 kg
Snatch	Esraa El-Sayed; Egypt	98 kg AF	Neama Said; Egypt	91 kg	Chaima Rahmouni; Tunisia	89 kg
Clean & Jerk	Neama Said; Egypt	111 kg	Esraa El-Sayed; Egypt	110 kg	Chaima Rahmouni; Tunisia	110 kg
Total	Esraa El-Sayed; Egypt	208 kg	Neama Said; Egypt	202 kg	Chaima Rahmouni; Tunisia	199 kg
71 kg
Snatch	Rania Ezzat; Egypt	97 kg	Cherara Ikram; Algeria	82 kg	Yosra Laabbidi; Tunisia	81 kg
Clean & Jerk	Rania Ezzat; Egypt	122 kg	Yosra Laabbidi; Tunisia	105 kg	Cherara Ikram; Algeria	101 kg
Total	Rania Ezzat; Egypt	219 kg	Yosra Laabbidi; Tunisia	186 kg	Cherara Ikram; Algeria	183 kg
76 kg
Snatch	Sara Ahmed; Egypt	112 kg AF	Alison Sunee; Mauritius	86 kg	Fatma Ahmed; Egypt	85 kg
Clean & Jerk	Sara Ahmed; Egypt	145 kg AF	Alison Sunee; Mauritius	105 kg	Fatma Ahmed; Egypt	105 kg
Total	Sara Ahmed; Egypt	257 kg AF	Alison Sunee; Mauritius	191 kg	Fatma Ahmed; Egypt	190 kg
81 kg
Snatch	Salma Ahmed; Egypt	90 kg	Bouchra Hirech; Algeria	86 kg	Samira Ouass; Morocco	75 kg
Clean & Jerk	Salma Ahmed; Egypt	111 kg	Bouchra Hirech; Algeria	106 kg	Samira Ouass; Morocco	90 kg
Total	Salma Ahmed; Egypt	201 kg	Bouchra Hirech; Algeria	192 kg	Samira Ouass; Morocco	165 kg
87 kg
Snatch	Samar Said; Egypt	103 kg	Ameni Ben Moussa; Tunisia	86 kg	Clementine Meukeugni; Cameroon	85 kg
Clean & Jerk	Samar Said; Egypt	125 kg	Clementine Meukeugni; Cameroon	115 kg	Ameni Ben Moussa; Tunisia	100 kg
Total	Samar Said; Egypt	228 kg	Clementine Meukeugni; Cameroon	200 kg	Ameni Ben Moussa; Tunisia	186 kg
+87 kg
Snatch	Halima Abdelazim; Egypt	120 kg AF	Shalinee Valaydon; Mauritius	95 kg		
Clean & Jerk	Halima Abdelazim; Egypt	145 kg	Shalinee Valaydon; Mauritius	115 kg		
Total	Halima Abdelazim; Egypt	265 kg	Shalinee Valaydon; Mauritius	210 kg		

== Medal table ==
Ranking by Big (Total result) medals

* Host nation (Egypt)

Rank	Nation	Gold	Silver	Bronze	Total
1	Egypt*	12	5	3	20
2	Tunisia	2	4	4	10
3	Madagascar	2	1	0	3
4	Nigeria	2	0	0	2
5	Morocco	1	2	2	5
6	Algeria	1	1	3	5
7	Mauritius	0	3	0	3
8	Libya	0	1	2	3
9	Cameroon	0	1	0	1
9	South Africa	0	1	0	1
11	Ghana	0	0	2	2
Totals (11 entries)		20	19	16	55

Ranking by all medals: Big (Total result) and Small (Snatch and Clean & Jerk)

Rank	Nation	Gold	Silver	Bronze	Total
1	Egypt*	36	15	9	60
2	Tunisia	7	11	12	30
3	Madagascar	6	3	0	9
4	Nigeria	6	0	0	6
5	Morocco	3	6	7	16
6	Algeria	2	5	9	16
7	Mauritius	0	9	0	9
8	Libya	0	3	6	9
9	South Africa	0	3	0	3
10	Cameroon	0	2	2	4
11	Ghana	0	0	3	3
Totals (11 entries)		60	57	48	165

== Team ranking ==
=== Men ===
Rank	Team	Points
1	Egypt	789
2	Morocco	652
3	Tunisia	651
4	Libya	298
5	Algeria	280
6	Ghana	242

=== Women ===
Rank	Team	Points
1	Egypt	801
2	Morocco	607
3	Tunisia	461
4	Algeria	344
5	Mauritius	291
6	Nigeria	168

== Participating nations ==
- Algeria (9)
- Botswana (3)
- Cameroon (5)
- Egypt (20)
- Ghana (6)
- Kenya (4)
- Libya (5)
- Nigeria (4)
- Mauritius (7)
- Morocco (20)
- Nigeria (4)
- South Africa (3)
- Tunisia (18)
- Uganda (4)
