= African Weightlifting Championships =

African Championship event

- Status: Active
- Genre: Sports Event
- Date: Usually April
- Frequency: Annual
- Location: Various
- Inaugurated: 1979
- Organiser: WFA

The African Weightlifting Championships is an event organised by Weightlifting Federation of Africa (WFA).

== Weights ==
Athletes compete in a total of 16 weight categories (8 for men and 8 for women) since 2026:

- Men categories: 60 kg, 65 kg, 71 kg, 79 kg, 88 kg, 94 kg, 110 kg and +110 kg.
- Women categories: 48 kg, 53 kg, 58 kg, 63 kg, 69 kg, 77 kg, 86 kg and +86 kg.

== Editions ==
https://intersportstats.com/competition_types/389

Year	Edition		Venue	Events	Results
Year	M	W	Venue	Events	Results
1979	1		Cairo, Egypt	30	
1985	2		Aswan, Egypt	30	
1986	3		Nairobi, Kenya	30	
1988	4		Cairo, Egypt	30	
1989	5		Boufarik, Algeria	30	
1990	6		Tripoli, Libya	30	
1992	7		Nairobi, Kenya	30	
1993	8		Cairo, Egypt	30	
1994	9		Cape Town, South Africa	30	
1996	10		Ismailia, Egypt	30	
1997	11		Cairo, Egypt	30	
1998	12	1	Algiers, Algeria	45	
2000	13	2	Yaoundé, Cameroon	45	
2001	14	3	Stellenbosch, South Africa	45	
2002	15	4	Nairobi, Kenya	45	
2004	16	5	Tunis, Tunisia	45	
2005	17	6	Kampala, Uganda	45	
2006	18	7	El Jadida, Morocco	45	
2008	19	8	Strand, South Africa	45	
2009	20	9	Kampala, Uganda	45	
2010	21	10	Yaoundé, Cameroon	45	
2011	22	11	Cape Town, South Africa	45	
2012	23	12	Nairobi, Kenya	45	
2013	24	13	Casablanca, Morocco	45	
2015	25	14	(Republic of the Congo) Brazzaville, Congo	45	
2016	26	15	Yaoundé, Cameroon	45	
2017	27	16	Vacoas, Mauritius	48	
2018	28	17	Mahébourg, Mauritius	48	
2019	29	18	Cairo, Egypt	60	
~~2020~~	30	19	Vacoas, Mauritius	60	
2021	31	20	Nairobi, Kenya	60	
2022	32	21	Cairo, Egypt	60	
2023	33	22	Tunis, Tunisia	60	
2024	34	23	Ismailia, Egypt	60	
2025	35	24	Moka, Mauritius	60	
2026	36	25	Ismailia, Egypt		

- Held jointly with the 2011 Commonwealth Championship.
- Held as part of the 2015 African Games.
- Was cancelled because of COVID-19 pandemic.

== Medals (2008-2023) (incomplete) ==
Ranking by Big (Total result) medals.

Rank	Nation	Gold	Silver	Bronze	Total
1	Tunisia	140	103	70	313
2	Egypt	108	39	24	171
3	Nigeria	81	47	16	144
4	Algeria	67	93	69	229
5	Cameroon	45	47	47	139
6	South Africa	24	35	48	107
7	Madagascar	20	19	14	53
8	Libya	17	32	28	77
9	Seychelles	16	25	25	66
10	Morocco	10	25	49	84
11	Mauritius	8	25	22	55
12	Uganda	4	10	9	23
13	Kenya	0	9	7	16
14	Ghana	0	5	19	24
15	Zambia	0	3	0	3
16	DR Congo	0	2	2	4
17	Botswana	0	0	2	2
18	Rwanda	0	0	1	1
Totals (18 entries)		540	519	452	1,511

== African Junior Weightlifting Championships ==
Since 1995.

== African Youth Weightlifting Championships ==
Year	Edition		Venue
Year	M	W	Venue
2009	1	1	Kampala, Uganda
2010	2	2	Cairo, Egypt
2011	3	3	
2012	4	4	Tunis, Tunisia
2013	5	5	Casablanca, Morocco
2014	6	6	Tunis, Tunisia
2015	7	7	Entebbe, Uganda
2016	8	8	Cairo, Egypt
2017	9	9	Entebbe, Uganda
2018	10	10	Cairo, Egypt
2019	11	11	Kampala, Uganda

== African Clubs Weightlifting Championships ==
Since 2022.

== See also ==
- Weightlifting at the 2007 All-Africa Games
- Weightlifting at the 2015 African Games
- Weightlifting at the 2019 African Games
