= List of Egyptian records in Olympic weightlifting =

The following are the records of Egypt in Olympic weightlifting. Records are maintained in each weight class for the snatch lift, clean and jerk lift, and the total for both lifts by the Egyptian Weightlifting Federation.

== Current records ==
=== Men ===
Event	Record	Athlete	Date	Meet	Place	Ref
60 kg
Snatch	124 kg	El-Sayed Aly Attia	3 October 2025	World Championships	Førde, Norway	
Clean & Jerk	154 kg	El-Sayed Aly Attia	3 October 2025	World Championships	Førde, Norway	
Total	278 kg	El-Sayed Aly Attia	3 October 2025	World Championships	Førde, Norway	
65 kg
Snatch	134 kg	Noureldin Zaky	9 November 2025	Islamic Solidarity Games	Riyadh, Saudi Arabia	
Clean & Jerk	174 kg	El-Sayed Aly Attia	9 October 2026	African Junior Championships	Mostaganem, Algeria	
Total	298 kg	Noureldin Zaky	9 November 2025	Islamic Solidarity Games	Riyadh, Saudi Arabia	
71 kg
Snatch	140 kg	Ahmed Said	14 May 2026	African Championships	Ismailia, Egypt	
Clean & Jerk	180 kg	Ahmed Said	14 May 2026	African Championships	Ismailia, Egypt	
Total	320 kg	Ahmed Said	14 May 2026	African Championships	Ismailia, Egypt	
79 kg
Snatch	166 kg	Mohamed Younes	10 November 2025	Islamic Solidarity Games	Riyadh, Saudi Arabia	
Clean & Jerk	198 kg	Mohamed Younes	6 October 2025	World Championships	Førde, Norway	
Total	362 kg	Mohamed Younes	10 November 2025	Islamic Solidarity Games	Riyadh, Saudi Arabia	
88 kg
Snatch	182 kg	Abdelrahman Younes	15 May 2026	African Championships	Ismailia, Egypt	
Clean & Jerk	210 kg	Abdelrahman Younes	15 May 2026	African Championships	Ismailia, Egypt	
Total	392 kg	Abdelrahman Younes	15 May 2026	African Championships	Ismailia, Egypt	
94 kg
Snatch	170 kg	Karim Abokahla	15 May 2026	African Championships	Ismailia, Egypt	
Clean & Jerk	210 kg	Karim Abokahla	15 May 2026	African Championships	Ismailia, Egypt	
Total	380 kg	Karim Abokahla	15 May 2026	African Championships	Ismailia, Egypt	
110 kg
Snatch						
Clean & Jerk						
Total						
+110 kg
Snatch						
Clean & Jerk						
Total						

=== Women ===
Event	Record	Athlete	Date	Meet	Place	Ref
48 kg
Snatch						
Clean & Jerk						
Total						
53 kg
Snatch	81 kg	Basma Gunaidy	2 May 2026	World Junior Championships	Ismailia, Egypt	
Clean & Jerk	106 kg	Basma Gunaidy	2 May 2026	World Junior Championships	Ismailia, Egypt	
Total	187 kg	Basma Gunaidy	2 May 2026	World Junior Championships	Ismailia, Egypt	
58 kg
Snatch	88 kg	Yasmine Abdalla	3 May 2026	World Junior Championships	Ismailia, Egypt	
Clean & Jerk	110 kg	Yasmine Abdalla	3 May 2026	World Junior Championships	Ismailia, Egypt	
Total	198 kg	Yasmine Abdalla	3 May 2026	World Junior Championships	Ismailia, Egypt	
63 kg
Snatch						
Clean & Jerk						
Total						
69 kg
Snatch						
Clean & Jerk						
Total						
77 kg
Snatch	115 kg	Sara Ahmed	11 November 2025	Islamic Solidarity Games	Riyadh, Saudi Arabia	
Clean & Jerk	145 kg	Sara Ahmed	11 November 2025	Islamic Solidarity Games	Riyadh, Saudi Arabia	
Total	260 kg	Sara Ahmed	11 November 2025	Islamic Solidarity Games	Riyadh, Saudi Arabia	
86 kg
Snatch	116 kg	Rahma Ahmed	12 November 2025	Islamic Solidarity Games	Riyadh, Saudi Arabia	
Clean & Jerk	151 kg	Sara Ahmed	15 May 2026	African Championships	Ismailia, Egypt	
Total	259 kg	Sara Ahmed	15 May 2026	African Championships	Ismailia, Egypt	
+86 kg
Snatch	103 kg	Fatma Mahmoud Sadek Ahmed	12 November 2025	Islamic Solidarity Games	Riyadh, Saudi Arabia	
Clean & Jerk	137 kg	Fatma Mahmoud Sadek Ahmed	12 November 2025	Islamic Solidarity Games	Riyadh, Saudi Arabia	
Total	240 kg	Fatma Mahmoud Sadek Ahmed	12 November 2025	Islamic Solidarity Games	Riyadh, Saudi Arabia	

== Historical records ==
=== Men (2018–2025) ===
Event	Record	Athlete	Date	Meet	Place	Ref
55 kg
Snatch	kg					
Clean & Jerk	kg					
Total	kg					
61 kg
Snatch	122 kg	Elsayed Aly Attia	20 September 2024	World Junior Championships	León, Spain	
Clean & Jerk	160 kg	Elsayed Aly Attia	1 May 2025	World Junior Championships	Lima, Peru	
Total	282 kg	Elsayed Aly Attia	1 May 2025	World Junior Championships	Lima, Peru	
67 kg
Snatch	134 kg	Ahmed Saad	26 April 2019	African Championships	Cairo, Egypt	
Clean & Jerk	168 kg	Ahmed Saad	26 April 2019	African Championships	Cairo, Egypt	
Total	302 kg	Ahmed Saad	26 April 2019	African Championships	Cairo, Egypt	
73 kg
Snatch	146 kg	Ahmed Mohamed	2 July 2022	Mediterranean Games	Oran, Algeria	
Clean & Jerk	185 kg	Moustafa Wahid	26 April 2019	African Championships	Cairo, Egypt	
Total	330 kg	Moustafa Wahid	26 April 2019	African Championships	Cairo, Egypt	
81 kg
Snatch	173 kg	Mohamed Ehab	5 November 2018	World Championships	Ashgabat, Turkmenistan	
Clean & Jerk	200 kg	Mohamed Ehab	5 November 2018	World Championships	Ashgabat, Turkmenistan	
Total	373 kg	Mohamed Ehab	5 November 2018	World Championships	Ashgabat, Turkmenistan	
89 kg
Snatch	171 kg	Karim Abokahla	3 July 2022	Mediterranean Games	Oran, Algeria	
Clean & Jerk	212 kg	Karim Abokahla	3 July 2022	Mediterranean Games	Oran, Algeria	
Total	383 kg	Karim Abokahla	3 July 2022	Mediterranean Games	Oran, Algeria	
96 kg
Snatch	174 kg	Karim Abokahla	13 September 2023	World Championships	Riyadh, Saudi Arabia	
Clean & Jerk	213 kg	Karim Abokahla	13 September 2023	World Championships	Riyadh, Saudi Arabia	
Total	387 kg	Karim Abokahla	13 September 2023	World Championships	Riyadh, Saudi Arabia	
102 kg
Snatch	170 kg	Mahmoud Hosny	8 February 2024	African Championships	Ismailia, Egypt	
Clean & Jerk	213 kg	Yasser Salem	14 September 2023	World Championships	Riyadh, Saudi Arabia	
Total	382 kg	Yasser Salem	14 September 2023	World Championships	Riyadh, Saudi Arabia	
109 kg
Snatch	165 kg	Gaber Mohamed	April 2019	African Championships	Cairo, Egypt	
Clean & Jerk	207 kg	Mohamed Mohamed	April 2019	African Championships	Cairo, Egypt	
Total	367 kg	Gaber Mohamed	April 2019	African Championships	Cairo, Egypt	
+109 kg
Snatch	191 kg	Abdelrahman El-Sayed	16 December 2022	World Championships	Bogotá, Colombia	
Clean & Jerk	243 kg	Abdelrahman El-Sayed	18 May 2023	African Championships	Tunis, Tunisia	
Total	433 kg	Abdelrahman El-Sayed	16 December 2022	World Championships	Bogotá, Colombia	

=== Women (2018–2025) ===
Event	Record	Athlete	Date	Meet	Place	Ref
45 kg
Snatch	69 kg	Habiba Abdel Fattah	15 November 2023	Junior World Championships	Guadalajara, Mexico	
Clean & Jerk	78 kg	Basma Ramadan	26 October 2023	African Youth Championships	Cairo, Egypt	
Total	137 kg	Habiba Saad	12 June 2022	Youth World Championships	León, Mexico	
49 kg
Snatch	79 kg	Noura Essam	5 December 2022	World Championships	Bogotá, Colombia	
Clean & Jerk	95 kg	Heba Saleh	April 2019	African Championships	Cairo, Egypt	
Total	168 kg	Heba Saleh	April 2019	African Championships	Cairo, Egypt	
55 kg
Snatch	85 kg	Basma Ibrahim	April 2019	African Championships	Cairo, Egypt	
Clean & Jerk	100 kg	Basma Ibrahim	April 2019	African Championships	Cairo, Egypt	
Total	185 kg	Basma Ibrahim	April 2019	African Championships	Cairo, Egypt	
59 kg
Snatch	88 kg	Basma Ibrahim	2 July 2022	Mediterranean Games	Oran, Algeria	
Clean & Jerk	113 kg	Basma Ibrahim	2 July 2022	Mediterranean Games	Oran, Algeria	
Total	201 kg	Basma Ibrahim	2 July 2022	Mediterranean Games	Oran, Algeria	
64 kg
Snatch	106 kg	Neama Said	12 December 2021	World Championships	Tashkent, Uzbekistan	
Clean & Jerk	127 kg	Neama Said	12 December 2021	World Championships	Tashkent, Uzbekistan	
Total	233 kg	Neama Said	12 December 2021	World Championships	Tashkent, Uzbekistan	
71 kg
Snatch	111 kg	Sara Ahmed	6 November 2018	World Championships	Ashgabat, Turkmenistan	
Clean & Jerk	141 kg	Sara Ahmed	6 November 2018	World Championships	Ashgabat, Turkmenistan	
Total	252 kg	Sara Ahmed	6 November 2018	World Championships	Ashgabat, Turkmenistan	
76 kg
Snatch	113 kg	Sara Ahmed	13 December 2022	World Championships	Bogotá, Colombia	
Clean & Jerk	148 kg	Sara Ahmed	13 December 2022	World Championships	Bogotá, Colombia	
Total	261 kg	Sara Ahmed	13 December 2022	World Championships	Bogotá, Colombia	
81 kg
Snatch	117 kg	Sara Ahmed	17 May 2023	African Championships	Tunis, Tunisia	
Clean & Jerk	151 kg	Sara Ahmed	17 May 2023	African Championships	Tunis, Tunisia	
Total	268 kg	Sara Ahmed	17 May 2023	African Championships	Tunis, Tunisia	
87 kg
Snatch	113 kg	Rahma Ahmed	14 December 2024	World Championships	Manama, Bahrain	
Clean & Jerk	136 kg	Rahma Ahmed	14 December 2024	World Championships	Manama, Bahrain	
Total	249 kg	Rahma Ahmed	14 December 2024	World Championships	Manama, Bahrain	
+87 kg
Snatch	124 kg	Halima Abdelazim	31 October 2022	African Championships	Cairo, Egypt	
Clean & Jerk	153 kg	Halima Abdelazim	15 December 2022	World Championships	Bogotá, Colombia	
Total	275 kg	Halima Abdelazim	15 December 2022	World Championships	Bogotá, Colombia	

=== Men (1998–2018) ===
Event	Record	Athlete	Date	Meet	Place	Ref
56 kg
Snatch						
Clean & Jerk						
Total						
62 kg
Snatch						
Clean & Jerk	162 kg	Ahmed Saad	30 July 2012	Olympic Games	London, Great Britain	
Total						
69 kg
Snatch	152 kg	Mohamed Ihab	10 November 2014	World Championships	Almaty, Kazakhstan	
Clean & Jerk	187,5 kg	Mohamed El-Tantawy	21 November 2002	World Championships	Warsaw, Poland	
Total	334 kg	Mohamed Ihab	10 November 2014	World Championships	Almaty, Kazakhstan	
77 kg
Snatch	165 kg	Mohamed Ihab	10 August 2016	Olympic Games	Rio de Janeiro, Brasil	
Clean & Jerk	201 kg	Mohamed Ihab	24 November 2015	World Championships	Houston, United States	
Total	363 kg	Mohamed Ihab	24 November 2015	World Championships	Houston, United States	
85 kg
Snatch						
Clean & Jerk	210 kg	Tarek Yehia Abdelazim	3 August 2012	Olympic Games	London, Great Britain	
Total	375 kg	Tarek Yehia Abdelazim	3 August 2012	Olympic Games	London, Great Britain	
94 kg
Snatch	174 kg	Ragab Abdelhay	13 August 2016	Olympic Games	Rio de Janeiro, Brasil	
Clean & Jerk	213 kg	Ragab Abdelhay	13 August 2016	Olympic Games	Rio de Janeiro, Brasil	
Total	387 kg	Ragab Abdelhay	13 August 2016	Olympic Games	Rio de Janeiro, Brasil	
105 kg
Snatch	182 kg	Ibrahim Moursi	16 November 2005	World Championships	Doha, Qatar	
Clean & Jerk	218 kg	Ibrahim Moursi	16 November 2005	World Championships	Doha, Qatar	
Total	400 kg	Ibrahim Moursi	16 November 2005	World Championships	Doha, Qatar	
+105 kg
Snatch	200 kg	Mohamed Masoud	11 September 2015	African Games	Brazzaville, Congo Republic	
Clean & Jerk	243 kg	Mohamed Masoud	16 November 2014	World Championships	Almaty, Kazakhstan	
Total	441 kg	Mohamed Masoud	11 September 2015	African Games	Brazzaville, Congo Republic	

=== Women (1998–2018) ===
Event	Record	Athlete	Date	Meet	Place	Ref
48 kg
Snatch						
Clean & Jerk						
Total						
53 kg
Snatch						
Clean & Jerk						
Total						
58 kg
Snatch						
Clean & Jerk						
Total						
63 kg
Snatch	104 kg	Sara Ahmed	12 November 2014	World Championships	Almaty, Kazakhstan	
Clean & Jerk						
Total	229 kg	Sara Ahmed	12 November 2014	World Championships	Almaty, Kazakhstan	
69 kg
Snatch	112 kg	Sara Ahmed	10 August 2016	Olympic Games	Rio de Janeiro, Brazil	
Clean & Jerk	143 kg	Sara Ahmed	10 August 2016	Olympic Games	Rio de Janeiro, Brazil	
Total	255 kg	Sara Ahmed	10 August 2016	Olympic Games	Rio de Janeiro, Brazil	
75 kg
Snatch	120 kg	Nahla Ramadan	20 August 2004	Olympic Games	Athens, Greece	
Clean & Jerk	147 kg	Nahla Ramadan	17 June 2003	World Junior Championships	Hermosillo, Mexico	
Total	262 kg	Nahla Ramadan	17 June 2003	World Junior Championships	Hermosillo, Mexico	
90 kg
Snatch	110 kg	Abeer Abdelrahman	11 June 2010	World Junior Championships	Sofia, Bulgaria	
Clean & Jerk	145 kg	Abeer Abdelrahman	11 June 2010	World Junior Championships	Sofia, Bulgaria	
Total	255 kg	Abeer Abdelrahman	11 June 2010	World Junior Championships	Sofia, Bulgaria	
+90 kg
Snatch	117 kg	Shaimaa Ahmed Khalaf	14 August 2016	Olympic Games	Rio de Janeiro, Brazil	
Clean & Jerk	161 kg	Shaimaa Ahmed Khalaf	14 August 2016	Olympic Games	Rio de Janeiro, Brazil	
Total	278 kg	Shaimaa Ahmed Khalaf	14 August 2016	Olympic Games	Rio de Janeiro, Brazil	
