= List of Ghanaian records in Olympic weightlifting =

The following are the national records in Olympic weightlifting in Ghana. Records are maintained in each weight class for the snatch lift, clean and jerk lift, and the total for both lifts by the National Sport Council, Ghana Weightlifting Federation.

== Current records ==
=== Men ===
Event	Record	Athlete	Date	Meet	Place	Ref
60 kg
Snatch						
Clean & Jerk						
Total						
65 kg
Snatch						
Clean & Jerk						
Total						
71 kg
Snatch	127 kg	Emmanuel Boateng	27 July 2026	Commonwealth Games	Glasgow, United Kingdom	
Clean & Jerk	155 kg	Emmanuel Boateng	27 July 2026	Commonwealth Games	Glasgow, United Kingdom	
Total	282 kg	Emmanuel Boateng	27 July 2026	Commonwealth Games	Glasgow, United Kingdom	
79 kg
Snatch						
Clean & Jerk						
Total						
88 kg
Snatch						
Clean & Jerk						
Total						
94 kg
Snatch	148 kg	Forrester Osei	29 July 2026	Commonwealth Games	Glasgow, United Kingdom	
Clean & Jerk	180 kg	Forrester Osei	29 July 2026	Commonwealth Games	Glasgow, United Kingdom	
Total	328 kg	Forrester Osei	29 July 2026	Commonwealth Games	Glasgow, United Kingdom	
110 kg
Snatch	133 kg	Abdul Salim Adjei	30 July 2026	Commonwealth Games	Glasgow, United Kingdom	
Clean & Jerk	165 kg	Abdul Salim Adjei	30 July 2026	Commonwealth Games	Glasgow, United Kingdom	
Total	298 kg	Abdul Salim Adjei	30 July 2026	Commonwealth Games	Glasgow, United Kingdom	
+110 kg
Snatch						
Clean & Jerk						
Total						

== Historical records ==
=== Men (2018–2025) ===
Event	Record	Athlete	Date	Meet	Place	Ref
55 kg
Snatch	83 kg	Paul Agrama	10 March 2024	African Games	Accra, Ghana	
Clean & Jerk	103 kg	Paul Agrama	10 March 2024	African Games	Accra, Ghana	
Total	188 kg	Paul Agrama	10 March 2024	African Games	Accra, Ghana	
61 kg
Snatch						
Clean & Jerk						
Total						
67 kg
Snatch	116 kg	Emmanuel Boateng	11 March 2024	African Games	Accra, Ghana	
Clean & Jerk	142 kg	Emmanuel Boateng	11 March 2024	African Games	Accra, Ghana	
Total	258 kg	Emmanuel Boateng	11 March 2024	African Games	Accra, Ghana	
73 kg
Snatch	106 kg	Emmanuel Allotey	11 March 2024	African Games	Accra, Ghana	
Clean & Jerk	142 kg	Emmanuel Allotey	11 March 2024	African Games	Accra, Ghana	
Total	248 kg	Emmanuel Allotey	11 March 2024	African Games	Accra, Ghana	
81 kg
Snatch	119 kg	Jeremiah Teg-Gbul Benye	April 2019	African Championships	Cairo, Egypt	
Clean & Jerk	140 kg	Jeremiah Teg-Gbul Benye	April 2019	African Championships	Cairo, Egypt	
Total	259 kg	Jeremiah Teg-Gbul Benye	April 2019	African Championships	Cairo, Egypt	
89 kg
Snatch	148 kg	Christian Amoah	April 2019	African Championships	Cairo, Egypt	
Clean & Jerk	172 kg	Christian Amoah	April 2019	African Championships	Cairo, Egypt	
Total	320 kg	Christian Amoah	April 2019	African Championships	Cairo, Egypt	
96 kg
Snatch	151 kg	Forrester Osei	April 2019	African Championships	Cairo, Egypt	
Clean & Jerk	186 kg	Forrester Osei	12 September 2023	World Championships	Riyadh, Saudi Arabia	
Total	337 kg	Forrester Osei	12 September 2023	World Championships	Riyadh, Saudi Arabia	
102 kg
Snatch	140 kg	Forrester Osei	13 March 2024	African Games	Accra, Ghana	
Clean & Jerk	180 kg	Forrester Osei	13 March 2024	African Games	Accra, Ghana	
Total	320	Forrester Osei	13 March 2024	African Games	Accra, Ghana	
109 kg
Snatch	128 kg	Solomon Ocquaye	31 October 2022	African Championships	Cairo, Egypt	
Clean & Jerk	152 kg	Solomon Ocquaye	31 October 2022	African Championships	Cairo, Egypt	
Total	280 kg	Solomon Ocquaye	31 October 2022	African Championships	Cairo, Egypt	
+109 kg
Snatch	132 kg	Gabriel Owusu	14 March 2024	African Games	Accra, Ghana	
Clean & Jerk	160 kg	Gabriel Owusu	14 March 2024	African Games	Accra, Ghana	
Total	292 kg	Gabriel Owusu	14 March 2024	African Games	Accra, Ghana	

=== Men (2018–2025) ===
Event	Record	Athlete	Date	Meet	Place	Ref
45 kg
Snatch						
Clean & Jerk						
Total						
49 kg
Snatch	63 kg	Winnifred Ntumi	30 July 2022	Commonwealth Games	Marston Green, United Kingdom	
Clean & Jerk	81 kg	Winnifred Ntumi	10 March 2024	African Games	Accra, Ghana	
Total	144 kg	Winnifred Ntumi	10 March 2024	African Games	Accra, Ghana	
55 kg
Snatch	66 kg	Sandra Owusu	9 December 2021	World Championships	Tashkent, Uzbekistan	
Clean & Jerk	77 kg	Sandra Owusu	9 December 2021	World Championships	Tashkent, Uzbekistan	
Total	143 kg	Sandra Owusu	9 December 2021	World Championships	Tashkent, Uzbekistan	
59 kg
Snatch	72 kg	Sandra Mensimah Owusu	15 May 2023	African Championships	Tunis, Tunisia	
Clean & Jerk	85 kg	Sandra Mensimah Owusu	15 May 2023	African Championships	Tunis, Tunisia	
Total	157 kg	Sandra Mensimah Owusu	15 May 2023	African Championships	Tunis, Tunisia	
64 kg
Snatch						
Clean & Jerk						
Total						
71 kg
Snatch						
Clean & Jerk						
Total						
76 kg
Snatch	81 kg	Sandra Owusu	13 March 2024	African Games	Accra, Ghana	
Clean & Jerk	92 kg	Sandra Owusu	13 March 2024	African Games	Accra, Ghana	
Total	173 kg	Sandra Owusu	13 March 2024	African Games	Accra, Ghana	
81 kg
Snatch						
Clean & Jerk						
Total						
87 kg
Snatch						
Clean & Jerk						
Total						
+87 kg
Snatch	67 kg	Marie Korkor Agbah Hughes	31 October 2022	African Championships	Cairo, Egypt	
Clean & Jerk	92 kg	Marie Korkor Agbah Hughes	May 2023	African Championships	Tunis, Tunisia	
Total	158 kg	Marie Korkor Agbah Hughes	May 2023	African Championships	Tunis, Tunisia	
