= List of African junior records in Olympic weightlifting =

This is the list of African junior records in Olympic weightlifting. They are the best results set in competition by athletes aged 20 or younger throughout the entire calendar year of the performance. Records are maintained in each weight class for the snatch, clean and jerk, and the total for both by the Weightlifting Federation of Africa (WFA).

== Current records ==
Key to tables: Awaiting ratification Not ratified or later rescinded by WFA

=== Men ===
Event	Record	Athlete	Nation	Date	Meet	Place	Age	Ref
60 kg
Snatch	124 kg	El-Sayed Aly Attia	Egypt	3 October 2025	World Championships	Førde, Norway	19 years, 274 days	
Clean & Jerk	154 kg	El-Sayed Aly Attia	Egypt	3 October 2025	World Championships	Førde, Norway	19 years, 274 days	
Total	278 kg	El-Sayed Aly Attia	Egypt	3 October 2025	World Championships	Førde, Norway	19 years, 274 days	
65 kg
Snatch	131 kg	El-Sayed Aly Attia	Egypt	3 May 2026	World Junior Championships	Ismailia, Egypt	20 years, 121 days	
Clean & Jerk	160 kg	El-Sayed Aly Attia	Egypt	3 May 2026	World Junior Championships	Ismailia, Egypt	20 years, 121 days	
Total	291 kg	El-Sayed Aly Attia	Egypt	3 May 2026	World Junior Championships	Ismailia, Egypt	20 years, 121 days	
70 kg
Snatch	135 kg	Standard						
Clean & Jerk	164 kg	Standard						
Total	298 kg	Standard						
75 kg
Snatch	149 kg	Abdelrahman Hussein	Egypt	1 September 2026	Mediterranean Games	San Giorgio Ionico, Italy	17 years, 260 days	
Clean & Jerk	174 kg	Standard						
Total	315 kg	Standard						
85 kg
Snatch	153 kg	Standard						
Clean & Jerk	185 kg	Standard						
Total	336 kg	Standard						
95 kg
Snatch	155 kg	Standard						
Clean & Jerk	188 kg	Standard						
Total	343 kg	Standard						
110 kg
Snatch	157 kg	Standard						
Clean & Jerk	192 kg	Standard						
Total	349 kg	Standard						
+110 kg
Snatch	159 kg	Standard						
Clean & Jerk	196 kg	Standard						
Total	354 kg	Standard						

=== Women ===
Event	Record	Athlete	Nation	Date	Meet	Place	Age	Ref
49 kg
Snatch	77 kg	Standard						
Clean & Jerk	97 kg	Standard						
Total	171 kg	Standard						
53 kg
Snatch	85 kg	Standard						
Clean & Jerk	106 kg	Basma Ramadan	Egypt	2 May 2026	World Junior Championships	Ismailia, Egypt	16 years, 285 days	
Total	187 kg	Standard						
57 kg
Snatch	89 kg	Standard						
Clean & Jerk	108 kg	Standard						
Total	195 kg	Standard						
61 kg
Snatch	91 kg	Standard						
Clean & Jerk	112 kg	Standard						
Total	203 kg	Standard						
69 kg
Snatch	97 kg	Standard						
Clean & Jerk	118 kg	Standard						
Total	215 kg	Standard						
77 kg
Snatch	116 kg	Sarah Matthew	Nigeria	11 November 2025	Islamic Solidarity Games	Riyadh, Saudi Arabia	19 years, 63 days	
Clean & Jerk	127 kg	Standard						
Total	245 kg	Sarah Matthew	Nigeria	11 November 2025	Islamic Solidarity Games	Riyadh, Saudi Arabia	19 years, 63 days	
86 kg
Snatch	115 kg	Rahma Ahmed	Egypt	9 October 2025	World Championships	Førde, Norway	19 years, 191 days	
Snatch	116 kg	Rahma Ahmed	Egypt	12 November 2025	Islamic Solidarity Games	Riyadh, Saudi Arabia	19 years, 225 days	
Clean & Jerk	136 kg	Standard						
Total	250 kg	Rahma Ahmed	Egypt	9 October 2025	World Championships	Førde, Norway	19 years, 191 days	
+86 kg
Snatch	103 kg	Standard						
Clean & Jerk	132 kg	Standard						
Total	232 kg	Standard						

== Historical records ==
=== Men (2025–2026) ===
Event	Record	Athlete	Nation	Date	Meet	Place	Age	Ref
71 kg
Snatch	139 kg	Standard						
Clean & Jerk	168 kg	Standard						
Total	306 kg	Standard						
79 kg
Snatch	155 kg	Mohammed Al-Zintani	Libya	20 August 2025	African Junior Championships	Accra, Ghana	19 years, 325 days	
Clean & Jerk	187 kg	Mohammed Al-Zintani	Libya	10 November 2025	Islamic Solidarity Games	Riyadh, Saudi Arabia	20 years, 42 days	
Total	339 kg	Mohammed Al-Zintani	Libya	20 August 2025	African Junior Championships	Accra, Ghana	19 years, 325 days	
88 kg
Snatch	160 kg	Standard						
Clean & Jerk	192 kg	Standard						
Total	350 kg	Standard						
94 kg
Snatch	163 kg	Standard						
Clean & Jerk	197 kg	Standard						
Total	358 kg	Standard						

=== Men (2018–2025) ===
Event	Record	Athlete	Nation	Date	Meet	Place	Age	Ref
55 kg
Snatch	112 kg	Standard						
Clean & Jerk	130 kg	Standard						
Total	238 kg	Standard						
61 kg
Snatch	122 kg	Elsayed Aly Attia	Egypt	20 September 2024	World Junior Championships	León, Spain	18 years, 262 days	
Clean & Jerk	149 kg	Elsayed Aly Attia	Egypt	20 September 2024	World Junior Championships	León, Spain	18 years, 262 days	
Clean & Jerk	160 kg	Elsayed Aly Attia	Egypt	1 May 2025	World Junior Championships	Lima, Peru	19 years, 119 days	
Total	271 kg	Elsayed Aly Attia	Egypt	20 September 2024	World Junior Championships	León, Spain	18 years, 262 days	
Total	282 kg	Elsayed Aly Attia	Egypt	1 May 2025	World Junior Championships	Lima, Peru	19 years, 119 days	
67 kg
Snatch	135 kg	Edidiong Umoafia	Nigeria	9 December 2021	World Championships	Tashkent, Uzbekistan	19 years, 76 days	
Clean & Jerk	161 kg	Mohamed Abdelmonim	Egypt	4 May 2022	Junior World Championships	Heraklion, Greece	18 years, 180 days	
Total	295 kg	Edidiong Umoafia	Nigeria	9 December 2021	World Championships	Tashkent, Uzbekistan	19 years, 76 days	
73 kg
Snatch	146 kg	Mohammed Al-Zintani	Libya	22 September 2024	World Junior Championships	León, Spain	18 years, 359 days	
Clean & Jerk	174 kg	Abdelrahman Hussein	Egypt	22 November 2024	African Youth Championships	Nairobi, Kenya	15 years, 343 days	
Total	317 kg	Mohammed Al-Zintani	Libya	22 September 2024	World Junior Championships	León, Spain	18 years, 359 days	
81 kg
Snatch	161 kg	Mohamed Younes	Egypt	23 September 2024	World Junior Championships	León, Spain	19 years, 314 days	
Clean & Jerk	189 kg	Mohamed Younes	Egypt	23 September 2024	World Junior Championships	León, Spain	19 years, 314 days	
Total	350 kg	Mohamed Younes	Egypt	23 September 2024	World Junior Championships	León, Spain	19 years, 314 days	
89 kg
Snatch	163 kg	Ahmed Ashour	Egypt	28 April 2019	African Championships	Cairo, Egypt	20 years, 108 days	
Clean & Jerk	200 kg	Ahmed Ashour	Egypt	28 April 2019	African Championships	Cairo, Egypt	20 years, 108 days	
Total	363 kg	Ahmed Ashour	Egypt	28 April 2019	African Championships	Cairo, Egypt	20 years, 108 days	
96 kg
Snatch	171 kg	Mahmoud Hosny	Egypt	12 December 2024	World Championships	Manama, Bahrain	19 years, 99 days	
Clean & Jerk	209 kg	Mahmoud Hosny	Egypt	13 September 2023	World Championships	Riyadh, Saudi Arabia	18 years, 9 days	
Total	374 kg	Mahmoud Hosny	Egypt	13 September 2023	World Championships	Riyadh, Saudi Arabia	18 years, 9 days	
102 kg
Snatch	170 kg	Mahmoud Hosny	Egypt	8 February 2024	African Championships	Ismailia, Egypt	18 years, 157 days	
Clean & Jerk	200 kg	Mahmoud Hosny	Egypt	8 February 2024	African Championships	Ismailia, Egypt	18 years, 157 days	
Clean & Jerk	203 kg	Mahmoud Hosny	Egypt	4 May 2025	World Junior Championships	Lima, Peru	19 years, 242 days	
Total	370 kg	Mahmoud Hosny	Egypt	8 February 2024	African Championships	Ismailia, Egypt	18 years, 157 days	
Total	371 kg	Mahmoud Hosny	Egypt	4 May 2025	World Junior Championships	Lima, Peru	19 years, 242 days	
109 kg
Snatch	173 kg	Aymen Bacha	Tunisia	29 April 2019	African Championships	Cairo, Egypt	19 years, 185 days	
Clean & Jerk	205 kg	Richmond Osarfo	Ghana	8 November 2018	World Championships	Ashgabat, Turkmenistan	18 years, 329 days	
Total	366 kg	Aymen Bacha	Tunisia	29 April 2019	African Championships	Cairo, Egypt	19 years, 185 days	
+109 kg
Snatch	166 kg	Standard						
Clean & Jerk	203 kg	Standard						
Total	368 kg	Standard						

=== Women (2025–2026) ===
Event	Record	Athlete	Nation	Date	Meet	Place	Age	Ref
48 kg
Snatch	77 kg	Standard						
Clean & Jerk	95 kg	Ruth Asouquo	Nigeria	25 August 2025	Commonwealth Junior Championships	Ahmedabad, India	19 years, 106 days	
Total	168 kg	Standard						
58 kg
Snatch	92 kg	Standard						
Clean & Jerk	112 kg	Standard						
Total	203 kg	Standard						
63 kg
Snatch	98 kg	Standard						
Clean & Jerk	120 kg	Standard						
Total	217 kg	Standard						

=== Women (2018–2025) ===
Event	Record	Athlete	Nation	Date	Meet	Place	Age	Ref
45 kg
Snatch	71 kg	Rosina Randafiarison	Madagascar	8 November 2019	African Zone 3 Championships	Antananarivo, Madagascar	19 years, 314 days	
Clean & Jerk	86 kg	Standard						
Total	156 kg	Rosina Randafiarison	Madagascar	8 November 2019	African Zone 3 Championships	Antananarivo, Madagascar	19 years, 314 days	
49 kg
Snatch	79 kg	Noura Essam	Egypt	5 December 2022	World Championships	Bogotá, Colombia	17 years, 259 days	
Clean & Jerk	96 kg	Stella Kingsley	Nigeria	8 December 2021	World Championships	Tashkent, Uzbekistan	19 years, 25 days	
Total	168 kg	Stella Kingsley	Nigeria	8 December 2021	World Championships	Tashkent, Uzbekistan	19 years, 25 days	
55 kg
Snatch	97 kg	Nouha Landoulsi	Tunisia	3 November 2018	World Championships	Ashgabat, Turkmenistan	20 years, 182 days	
Clean & Jerk	114 kg	Nouha Landoulsi	Tunisia	3 November 2018	World Championships	Ashgabat, Turkmenistan	20 years, 182 days	
Clean & Jerk	116 kg	Adijat Olarinoye	Nigeria	26 August 2019	African Games	Rabat, Morocco	20 years, 43 days	
Total	211 kg	Nouha Landoulsi	Tunisia	3 November 2018	World Championships	Ashgabat, Turkmenistan	20 years, 182 days	
59 kg
Snatch	92 kg	Ghofrane Belkhir	Tunisia	10 December 2018	International Solidarity Championships	Cairo, Egypt	17 years, 121 days	
Clean & Jerk	120 kg	Ghofrane Belkhir	Tunisia	25 May 2021	World Junior Championships	Tashkent, Uzbekistan	19 years, 287 days	
Total	211 kg	Ghofrane Belkhir	Tunisia	25 May 2021	World Junior Championships	Tashkent, Uzbekistan	19 years, 287 days	
64 kg
Snatch	106 kg	Neama Said	Egypt	12 December 2021	World Championships	Tashkent, Uzbekistan	19 years, 27 days	
Clean & Jerk	127 kg	Neama Said	Egypt	12 December 2021	World Championships	Tashkent, Uzbekistan	19 years, 27 days	
Total	233 kg	Neama Said	Egypt	12 December 2021	World Championships	Tashkent, Uzbekistan	19 years, 27 days	
71 kg
Snatch	111 kg	Sara Ahmed	Egypt	6 November 2018	World Championships	Ashgabat, Turkmenistan	20 years, 309 days	
Clean & Jerk	141 kg	Sara Ahmed	Egypt	6 November 2018	World Championships	Ashgabat, Turkmenistan	20 years, 309 days	
Total	252 kg	Sara Ahmed	Egypt	6 November 2018	World Championships	Ashgabat, Turkmenistan	20 years, 309 days	
76 kg
Snatch	110 kg	Sara Ahmed	Egypt	11 December 2018	International Solidarity Championships	Cairo, Egypt	20 years, 344 days	
Clean & Jerk	140 kg	Sara Ahmed	Egypt	11 December 2018	International Solidarity Championships	Cairo, Egypt	20 years, 344 days	
Total	250 kg	Sara Ahmed	Egypt	11 December 2018	International Solidarity Championships	Cairo, Egypt	20 years, 344 days	
81 kg
Snatch	107 kg	Standard						
Clean & Jerk	132 kg	Standard						
Total	237 kg	Standard						
87 kg
Snatch	113 kg	Rahma Ahmed	Egypt	14 December 2024	World Championships	Manama, Bahrain	18 years, 257 days	
Clean & Jerk	136 kg	Rahma Ahmed	Egypt	14 December 2024	World Championships	Manama, Bahrain	18 years, 257 days	
Total	249 kg	Rahma Ahmed	Egypt	14 December 2024	World Championships	Manama, Bahrain	18 years, 257 days	
+87 kg
Snatch	105 kg	Shimaa Khaled	Egypt	30 October 2023	African Junior Championships	Cairo, Egypt	19 years, 258 days	
Clean & Jerk	140 kg	Shimaa Khaled	Egypt	30 October 2023	African Junior Championships	Cairo, Egypt	19 years, 258 days	
Total	245 kg	Shimaa Khaled	Egypt	30 October 2023	African Junior Championships	Cairo, Egypt	19 years, 258 days	
