= List of Kenyan records in Olympic weightlifting =

The following are the national records in Olympic weightlifting in Kenya. Records are maintained in each weight class for the snatch lift, clean and jerk lift, and the total for both lifts by the Kenya Amateur Weightlifting Association.

== Current records ==
=== Women ===
Event	Record	Athlete	Date	Meet	Place	Ref
48 kg
Snatch	58 kg	Janet Oduor	26 July 2026	Commonwealth Games	Glasgow, United Kingdom	
Clean & Jerk	75 kg	Janet Oduor	26 July 2026	Commonwealth Games	Glasgow, United Kingdom	
Total	133 kg	Janet Oduor	26 July 2026	Commonwealth Games	Glasgow, United Kingdom	
53 kg
Snatch						
Clean & Jerk						
Total						
58 kg
Snatch						
Clean & Jerk						
Total						
63 kg
Snatch						
Clean & Jerk						
Total						
69 kg
Snatch						
Clean & Jerk						
Total						
77 kg
Snatch	90 kg	Rachel Achieng Enock	29 July 2026	Commonwealth Games	Glasgow, United Kingdom	
Clean & Jerk						
Total						
86 kg
Snatch						
Clean & Jerk						
Total						
+86 kg
Snatch						
Clean & Jerk						
Total						

== Historical records ==
=== Men (2018–2025) ===
Event	Record	Athlete	Date	Meet	Place	Ref
55 kg
Snatch	65 kg	Benjamin Ochoma	30 July 2022	Commonwealth Games	Marston Green, United Kingdom	
Clean & Jerk	85 kg	Benjamin Ochoma	30 July 2022	Commonwealth Games	Marston Green, United Kingdom	
Total	150 kg	Benjamin Ochoma	30 July 2022	Commonwealth Games	Marston Green, United Kingdom	
61 kg
Snatch	93 kg	Joshua Mboya	10 March 2024	African Games	Accra, Ghana	
Clean & Jerk	113 kg	Joshua Mboya	10 March 2024	African Games	Accra, Ghana	
Total	206 kg	Joshua Mboya	10 March 2024	African Games	Accra, Ghana	
67 kg
Snatch						
Clean & Jerk						
Total						
73 kg
Snatch	121 kg	Anthony Masinde	10 December 2021	World Championships	Tashkent, Uzbekistan	
Clean & Jerk	140 kg	Anthony Masinde	10 December 2021	World Championships	Tashkent, Uzbekistan	
Total	261 kg	Anthony Masinde	10 December 2021	World Championships	Tashkent, Uzbekistan	
81 kg
Snatch	123 kg	Webstar Ndoli Lukose	April 2019	African Championships	Cairo, Egypt	
Clean and Jerk	152 kg	Webstar Ndoli Lukose	April 2019	African Championships	Cairo, Egypt	
Total	275 kg	Webstar Ndoli Lukose	April 2019	African Championships	Cairo, Egypt	
89 kg
Snatch	115 kg	Maurice Aromo	10 September 2023	World Championships	Riyadh, Saudi Arabia	
Clean and Jerk	145 kg	Maurice Aromo	9 December 2023	IWF Grand Prix II	Doha, Qatar	
Total	255 kg	Maurice Aromo	10 September 2023	World Championships	Riyadh, Saudi Arabia	
96 kg
Snatch						
Clean and Jerk						
Total						
102 kg
Snatch						
Clean and Jerk						
Total						
109 kg
Snatch						
Clean and Jerk						
Total						
+109 kg
Snatch						
Clean and Jerk						
Total						

=== Women (2018–2025) ===
Event	Record	Athlete	Date	Meet	Place	Ref
45 kg
Snatch	50 kg	Ester Mboya	10 March 2024	African Games	Accra, Ghana	
Clean & Jerk	65 kg	Ester Mboya	10 March 2024	African Games	Accra, Ghana	
Total	115 kg	Ester Mboya	10 March 2024	African Games	Accra, Ghana	
49 kg
Snatch	45 kg	Janet Oduor	8 December 2021	World Championships	Tashkent, Uzbekistan	
Clean & Jerk	58 kg	Janet Oduor	8 December 2021	World Championships	Tashkent, Uzbekistan	
Total	103 kg	Janet Oduor	8 December 2021	World Championships	Tashkent, Uzbekistan	
55 kg
Snatch	50 kg	Caroline Wangechi	9 December 2021	World Championships	Tashkent, Uzbekistan	
Clean & Jerk	65 kg	Caroline Wangechi	9 December 2021	World Championships	Tashkent, Uzbekistan	
Total	115 kg	Caroline Wangechi	9 December 2021	World Championships	Tashkent, Uzbekistan	
59 kg
Snatch	67 kg	Winny Langat	11 December 2021	World Championships	Tashkent, Uzbekistan	
Clean & Jerk	87 kg	Winny Langat	11 December 2021	World Championships	Tashkent, Uzbekistan	
Total	154 kg	Winny Langat	11 December 2021	World Championships	Tashkent, Uzbekistan	
64 kg
Snatch	71 kg	Winnie Atieno Okoth	April 2019	African Championships	Cairo, Egypt	
Clean & Jerk	89 kg	Winnie Atieno Okoth	April 2019	African Championships	Cairo, Egypt	
Total	160 kg	Winnie Atieno Okoth	April 2019	African Championships	Cairo, Egypt	
71 kg
Snatch	77 kg	Rachael Enock	11 September 2023	World Championships	Riyadh, Saudi Arabia	
Clean & Jerk	88 kg	Rachael Enock	7 April 2024	World Cup	Phuket, Thailand	
Total	164 kg	Rachael Enock	7 April 2024	World Cup	Phuket, Thailand	
76 kg
Snatch	71 kg	Wilkistar Nyiro	14 December 2021	World Championships	Tashkent, Uzbekistan	
Clean & Jerk	84 kg	Wilkistar Nyiro	29 May 2021	African Championships	Nairobi, Kenya	
Total	154 kg	Wilkistar Nyiro	29 May 2021	African Championships	Nairobi, Kenya	
81 kg
Snatch	73 kg	Juliana Ongonga	13 March 2024	African Games	Accra, Ghana	
Clean & Jerk	92 kg	Juliana Ongonga	13 March 2024	African Games	Accra, Ghana	
Total	165 kg	Juliana Ongonga	13 March 2024	African Games	Accra, Ghana	
87 kg
Snatch						
Clean & Jerk						
Total						
+87 kg
Snatch						
Clean & Jerk						
Total						
