= Neama =

Neama is a given name. Notable people with the given name include:

- Neama Rahmani (born 1979), American personal injury lawyer, writer, and former federal prosecutor
- Neama Riadh (born 1989), Iraqi television presenter
- Neama Said (born 2002), Egyptian weightlifter
