= Alex Bellemarre =

Canadian weightlifter (born 1998)

Personal information
- Born: June 22, 1998 (age 28) La Sarre, Quebec, Canada

Sport
- Country: Canada
- Sport: Weightlifting
- Weight class: 94 kg
Medal record
Men's weightlifting
Representing Canada
Commonwealth Games
Silver medal – second place	2026 Glasgow	94 kg
Commonwealth Championships
Gold medal – first place	2021 Tashkent	89 kg
Bronze medal – third place	2017 Gold Coast	85 kg
Pan American Championships
Bronze medal – third place	2023 Bariloche	89 kg
World University Games
Bronze medal – third place	2017 Taipei	77 kg

Alex Bellemarre (born June 22, 1998) is a Canadian weightlifter.

== Career ==
On September 25, 2023, Bellemarre was selected to represent Canada at the 2023 Pan American Games.

In July 2026, he competed at the 2026 Commonwealth Games and won a silver medal in the 94 kg event. He opened the event with 159 kg in the snatch, setting a Commonwealth Games record. He followed it up with 187 kg in the clean and jerk, for a total lift of 346 kg. He finished one kg behind gold medalist Mohamad Syahmi.
