= Svitlana Samuliak =

Ukrainian weightlifter (born 2003)

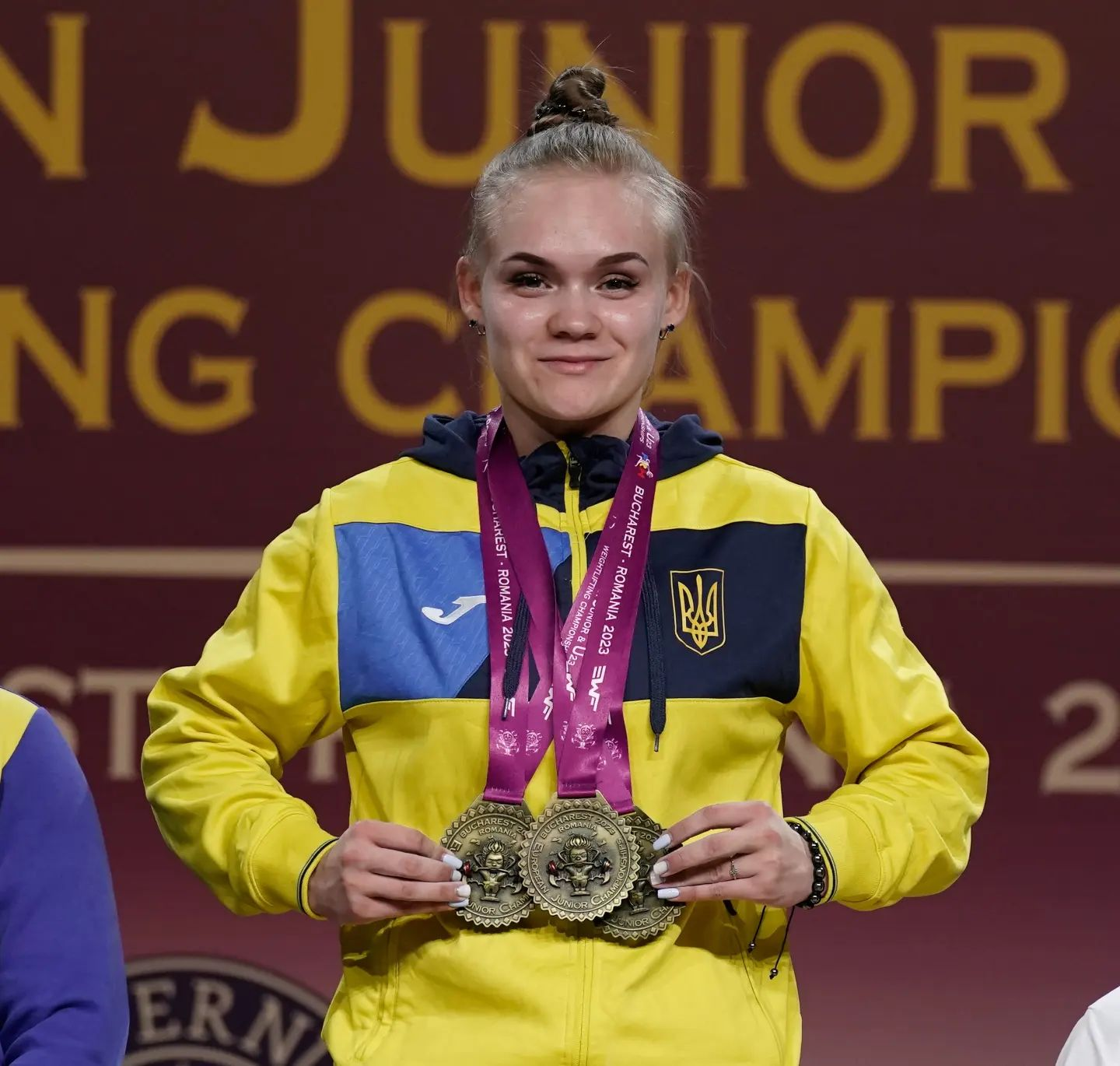

Personal information
- Born: 19 July 2003 (age 22)

Sport
- Country: Ukraine
- Sport: Weightlifting
- Weight class: 55 kg; 59 kg
Medal record
Women's weightlifting
Representing Ukraine
World Championships
Bronze medal – third place	2021 Tashkent	55 kg
European Championships
Silver medal – second place	2023 Yerevan	55 kg
Silver medal – second place	2024 Sofia	64 kg
Junior World Championships
Gold medal – first place	2023 Guadalajara	59 kg
Silver medal – second place	2022 Heraklion	55 kg

Svitlana Samuliak (Ukrainian: Світлана Самуляк) (born 19 July 2003) is a Ukrainian weightlifter. She won the bronze medal in the women's 55 kg event at the 2021 World Weightlifting Championships held in Tashkent, Uzbekistan. She is also a two-time silver medalist at the European Weightlifting Championships.

== Career ==
In 2021, Samuliak competed in the women's 59 kg event at the Junior World Weightlifting Championships held in Tashkent, Uzbekistan. At the 2021 European Junior & U23 Weightlifting Championships in Rovaniemi, Finland, she won the gold medal in her event.

Samuliak won the silver medal in the women's 55 kg event at the 2022 Junior World Weightlifting Championships held in Heraklion, Greece. Samuliak also won the silver medal in the women's 55 kg event at the 2023 European Weightlifting Championships held in Yerevan, Armenia.

In 2023, she competed in the women's 59 kg event at the World Weightlifting Championships held in Riyadh, Saudi Arabia.

== Achievements ==
Year	Venue	Weight	Snatch (kg)				Clean & Jerk (kg)				Total	Rank
Year	Venue	Weight	1	2	3	Rank	1	2	3	Rank	Total	Rank
World Championships
2021	Tashkent, Uzbekistan	55 kg	88	90	91	2nd place, silver medalist(s)	105	108	110	5	201	3rd place, bronze medalist(s)
2023	Riyadh, Saudi Arabia	59 kg	93	~~95~~	~~95~~	23	110	~~113~~	~~113~~	28	203	26
European Championships
2023	Yerevan, Armenia	55 kg	90	~~92~~	~~92~~	2nd place, silver medalist(s)	105	109	~~112~~	2nd place, silver medalist(s)	199	2nd place, silver medalist(s)
2024	Sofia, Bulgaria	64 kg	97	99	101	1st place, gold medalist(s)	115	118	~~120~~	3rd place, bronze medalist(s)	219	2nd place, silver medalist(s)
