= Weightlifting at the 2018 Summer Youth Olympics – Girls' 58 kg =

Girls' 58 kg at the III Summer Youth Olympic Games
- Venue: Parque Polideportivo Roca
- Dates: October 11
- Competitors: 8 from 8 nations

Medalists
1st place, gold medalist(s)		Ghofrane Belkhir	Tunisia
2nd place, silver medalist(s)		Neama Said Fahmi Said	Egypt
3rd place, bronze medalist(s)		Peyton Brown	United States

These are the results for the girls' 58 kg event at the 2018 Summer Youth Olympics.

== Results ==
Rank	Name	Nation	Body Weight	Snatch (kg)				Clean & Jerk (kg)				Total (kg)
Rank	Name	Nation	Body Weight	1	2	3	Res	1	2	3	Res	Total (kg)
1st place, gold medalist(s)	Ghofrane Belkhir	Tunisia		85	88	~~90~~	88	105	~~107~~	108	108	196
2nd place, silver medalist(s)	Neama Said Fahmi Said	Egypt		80	85	87	87	100	~~106~~	107	107	194
3rd place, bronze medalist(s)	Peyton Brown	United States		80	~~84~~	85	85	97	101	~~106~~	106	186
4	Islamiyat Yusuf	Nigeria		~~73~~	73	78	78	90	~~95~~	95	95	173
5	Mary Kardara	Greece		73	76	~~81~~	76	85	90	~~93~~	90	166
6	Lala Rzazade	Azerbaijan		63	67	~~70~~	67	76	~~80~~	80	80	147
7	Sandra Mensimah Owusu	Ghana		62	65	~~67~~	65	77	~~80~~	~~80~~	77	142
8	Betty Waneasi	Solomon Islands		53	57	~~61~~	57	67	72	~~75~~	72	129

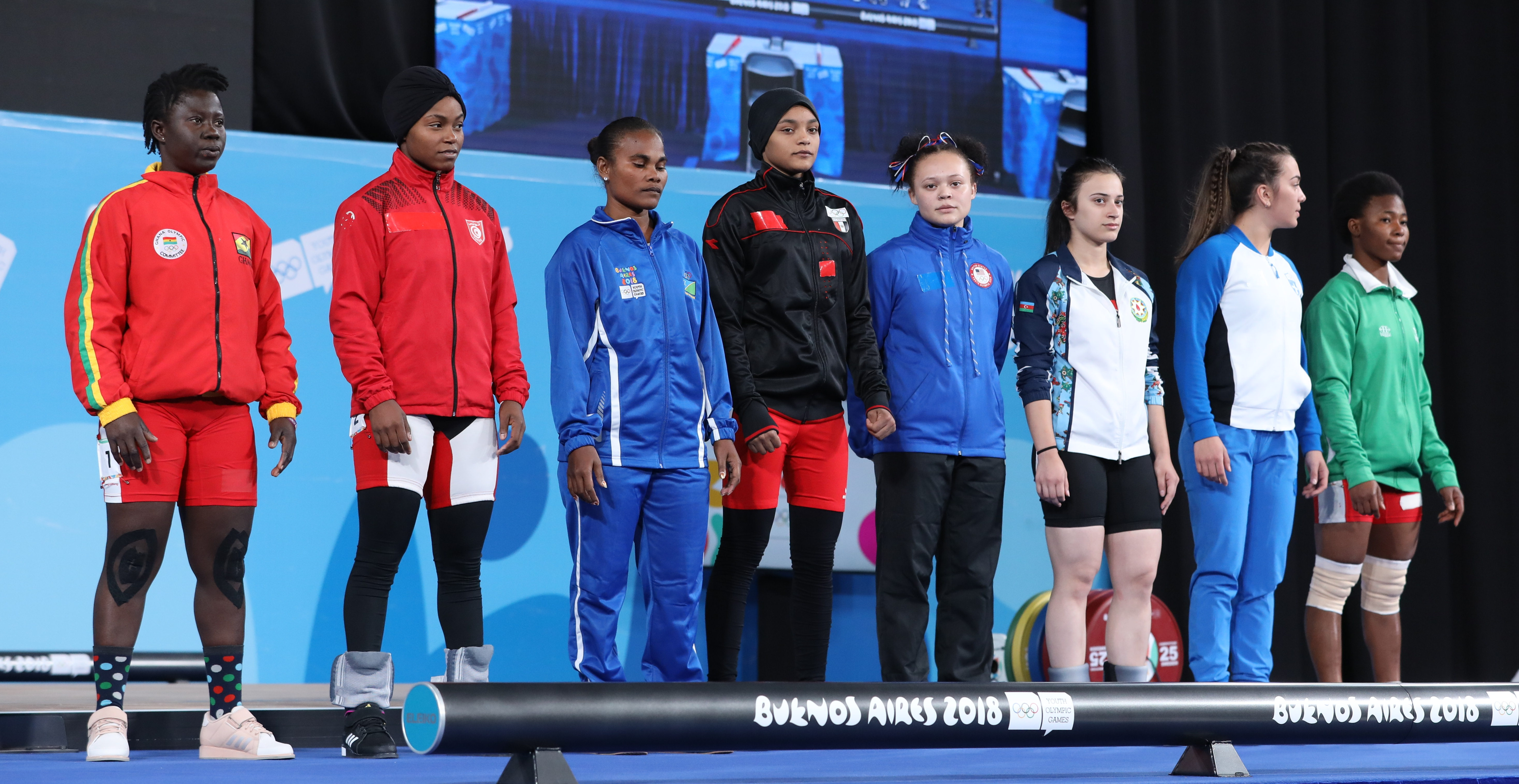
Presentation of the athletes

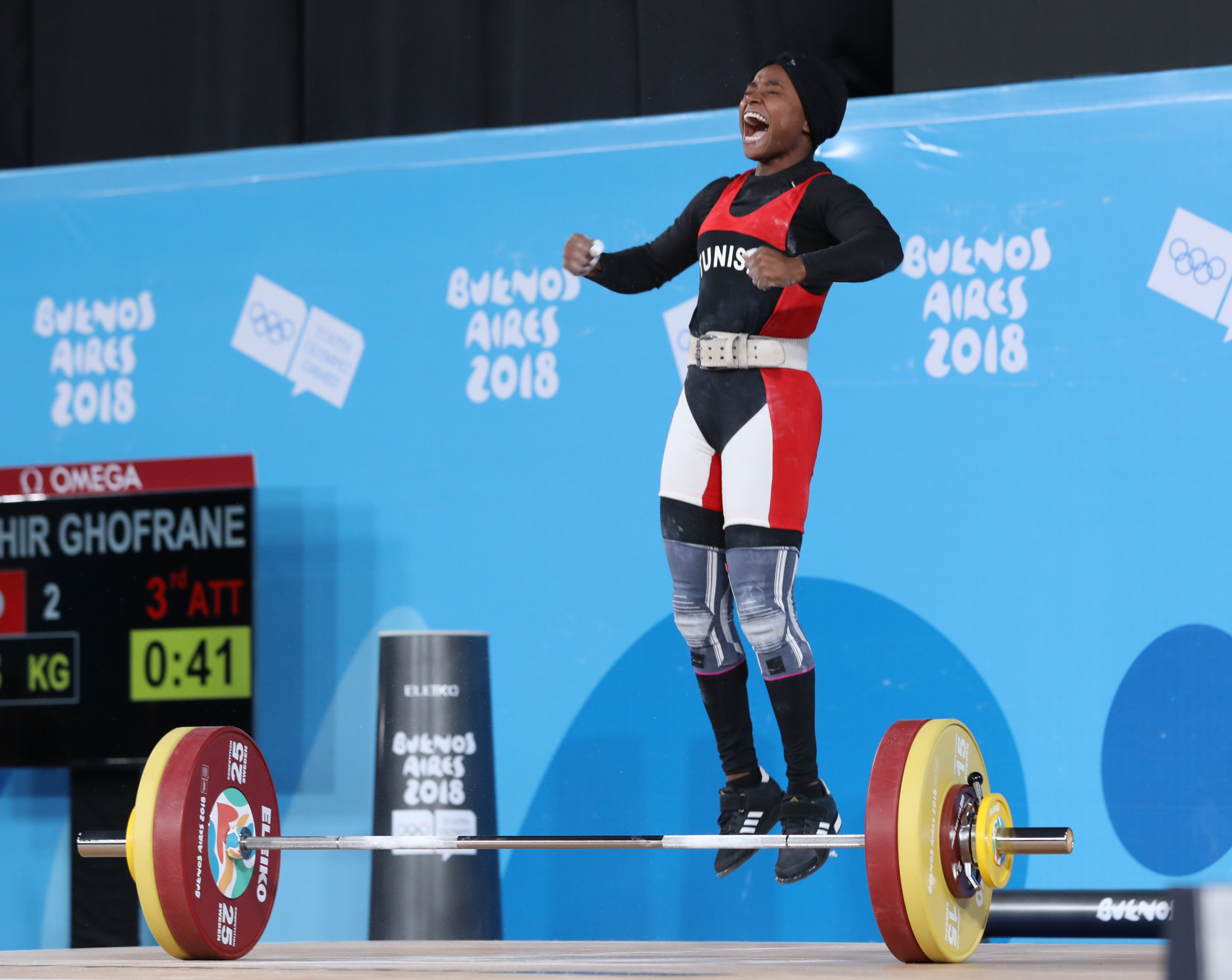
Ghofrane Belkhir

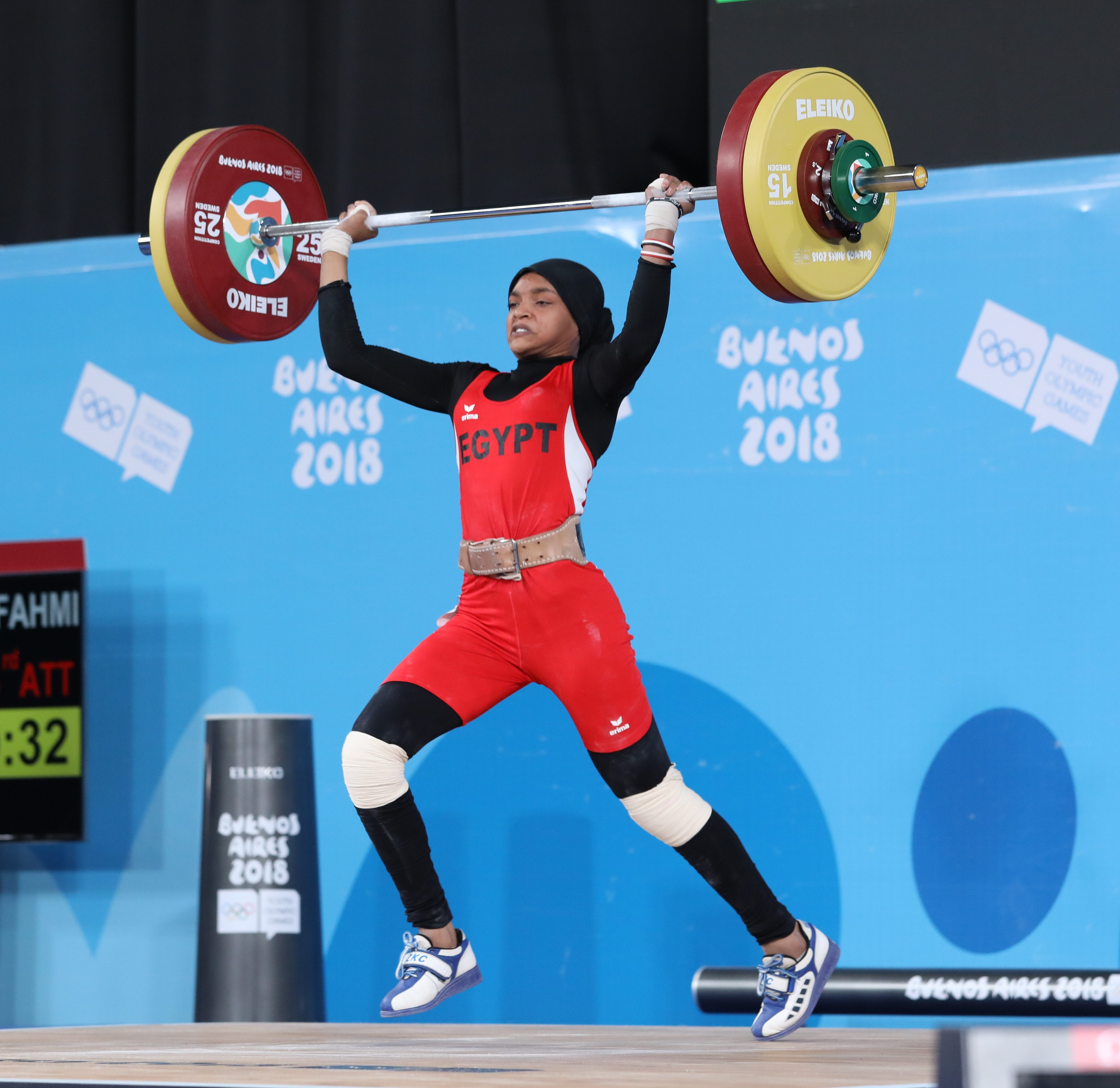
Neama Said Fahmi Said

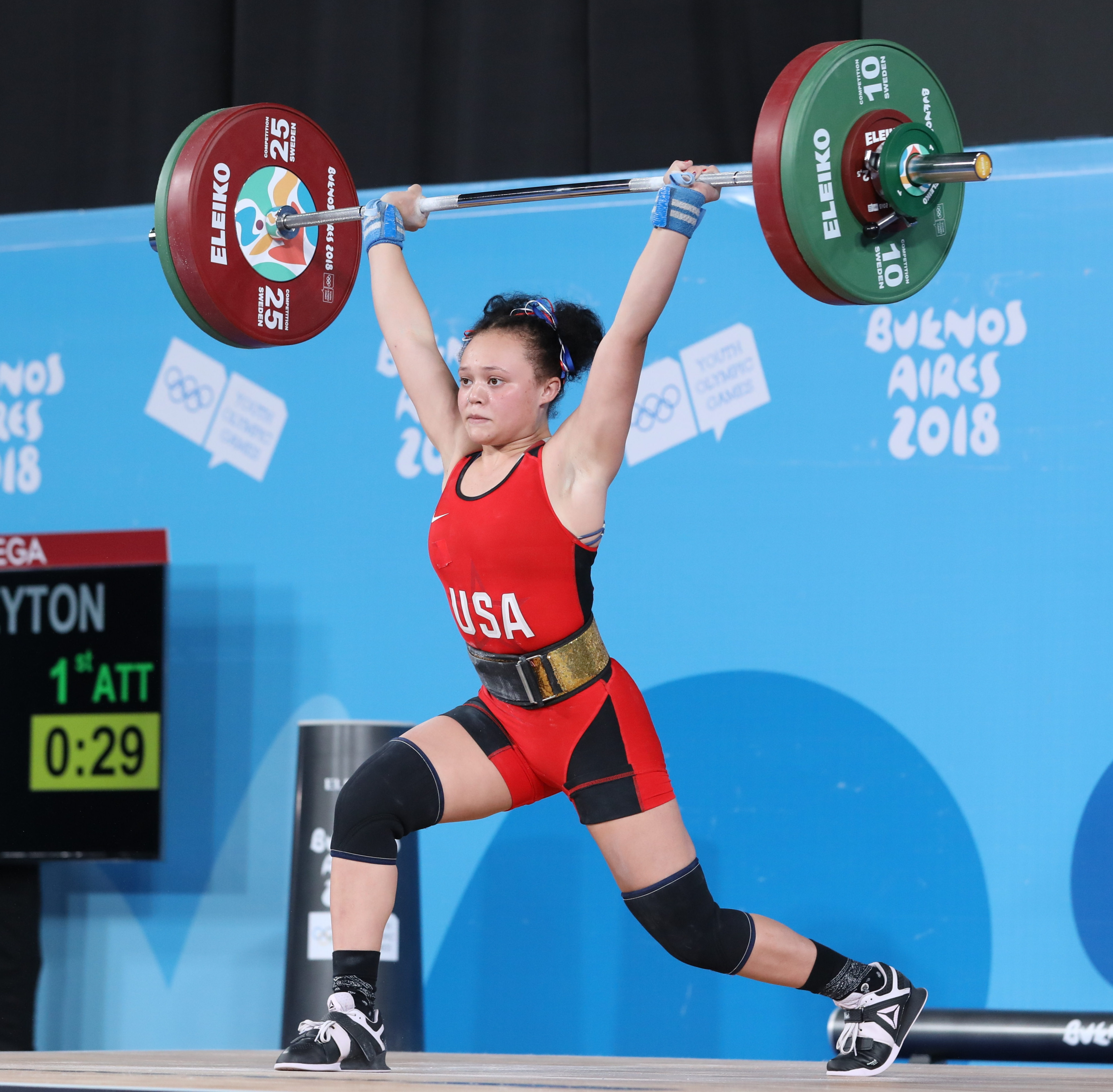
Peyton Brown

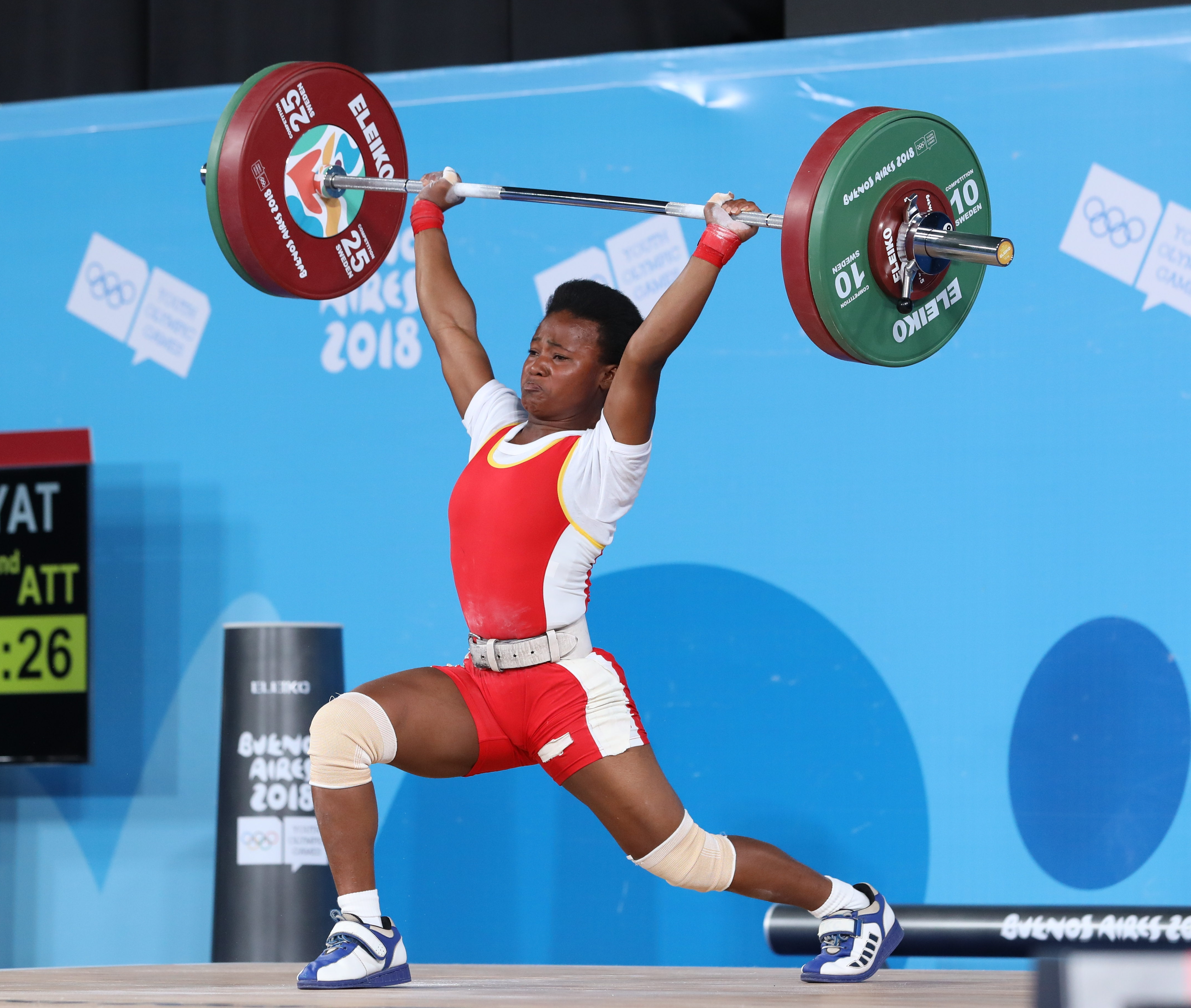
Islamiyat Yusuf

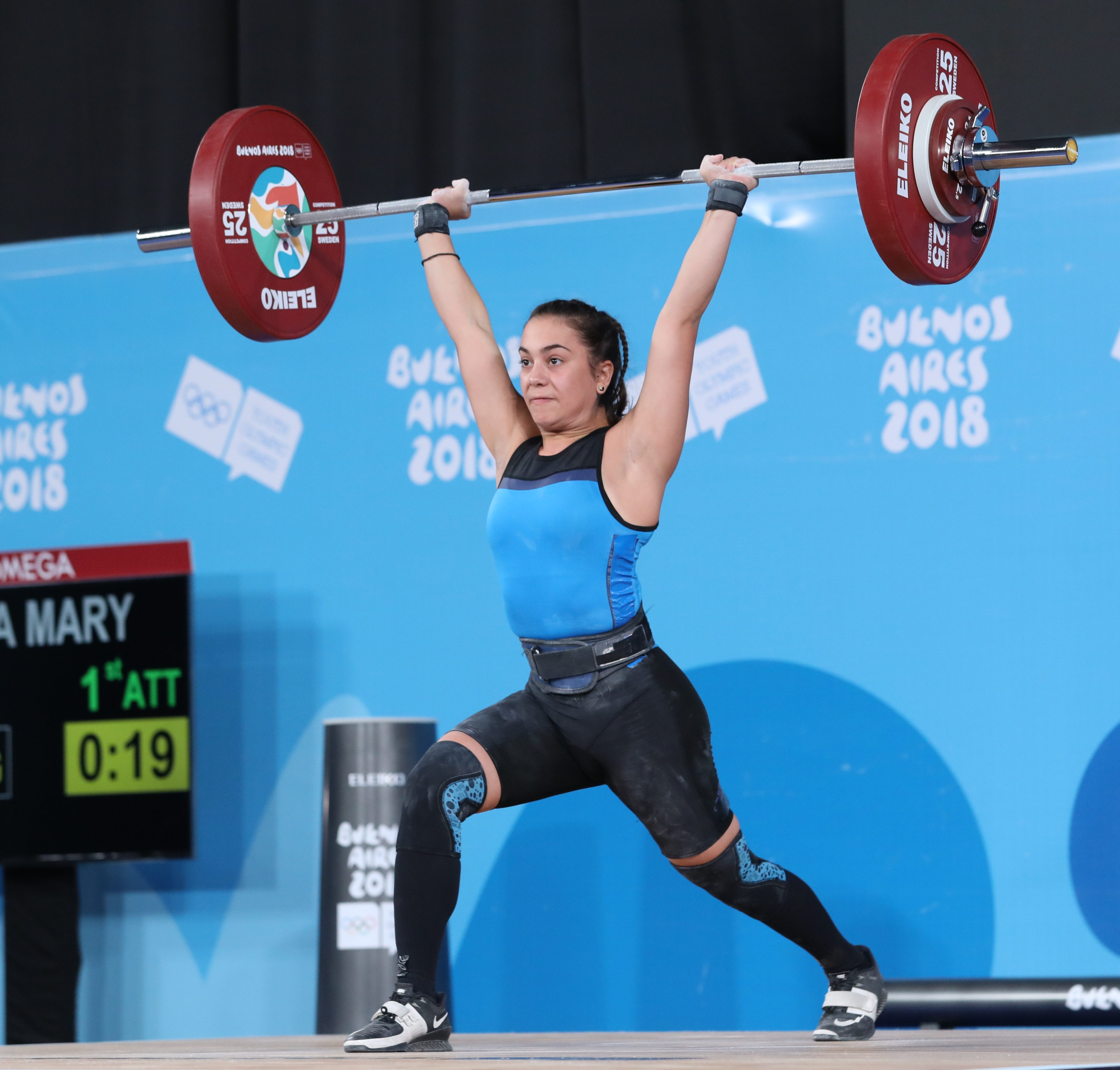
Mary Kardara

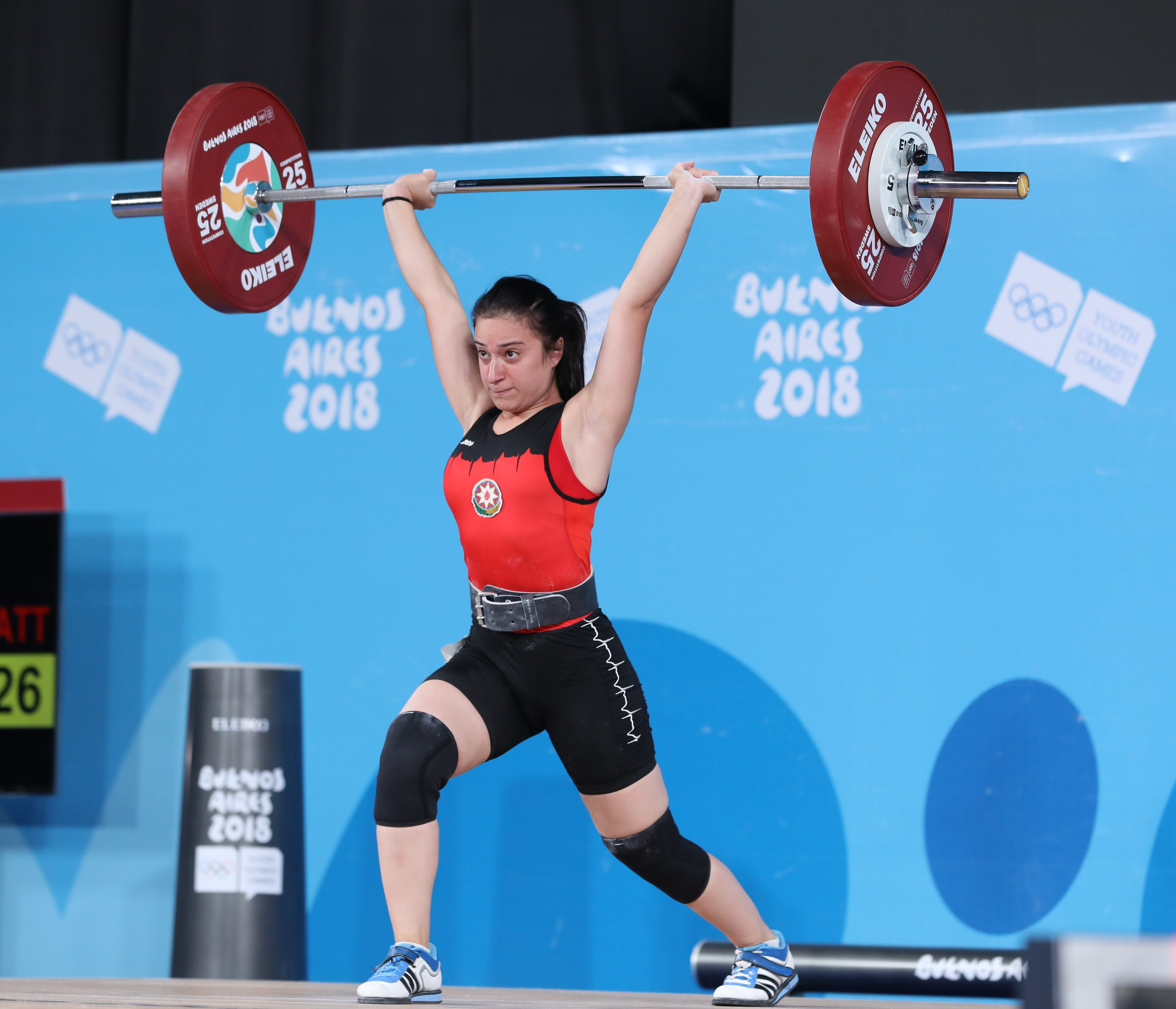
Lala Rzazade

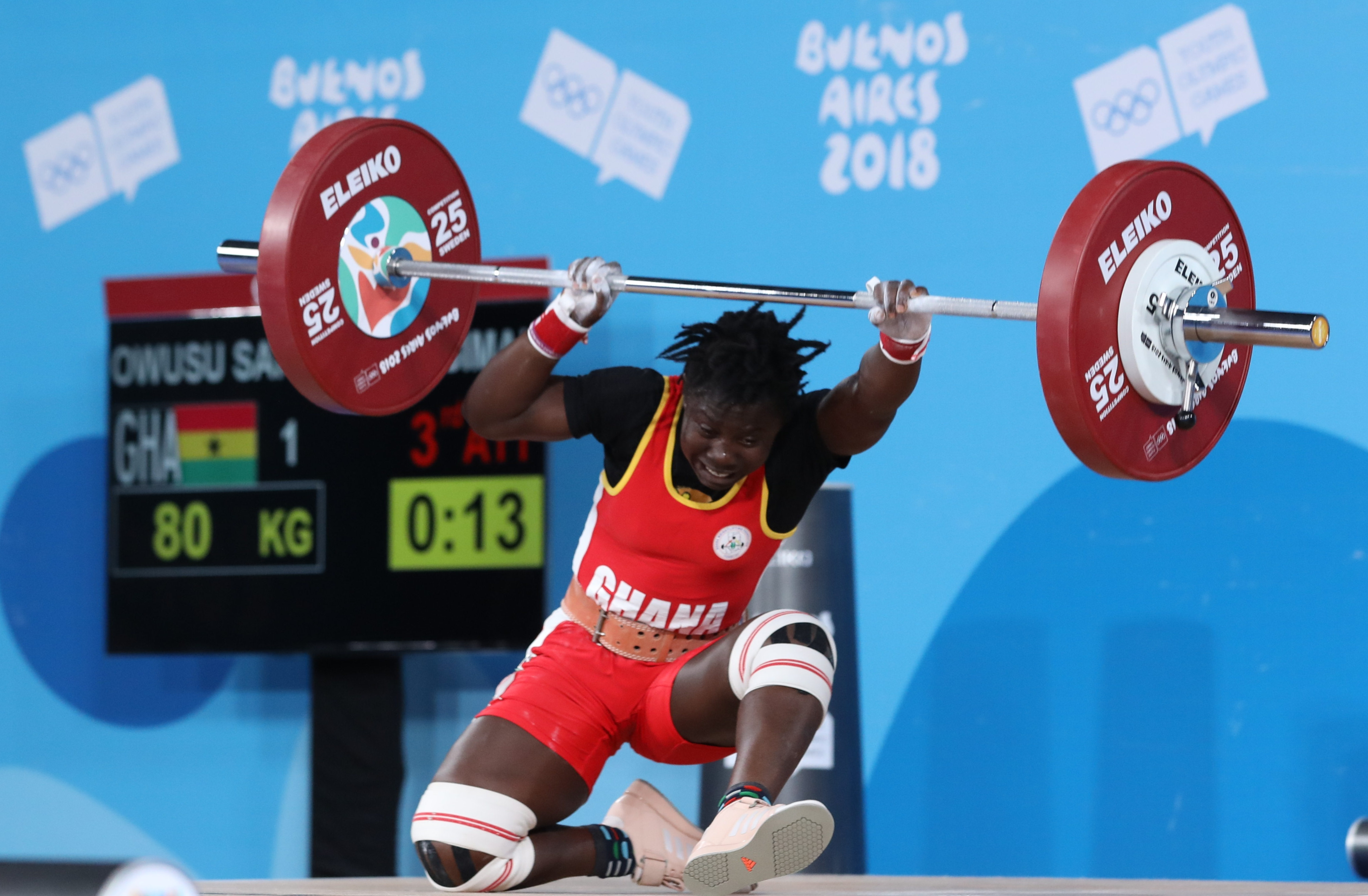
Sandra Mensimah Owusu

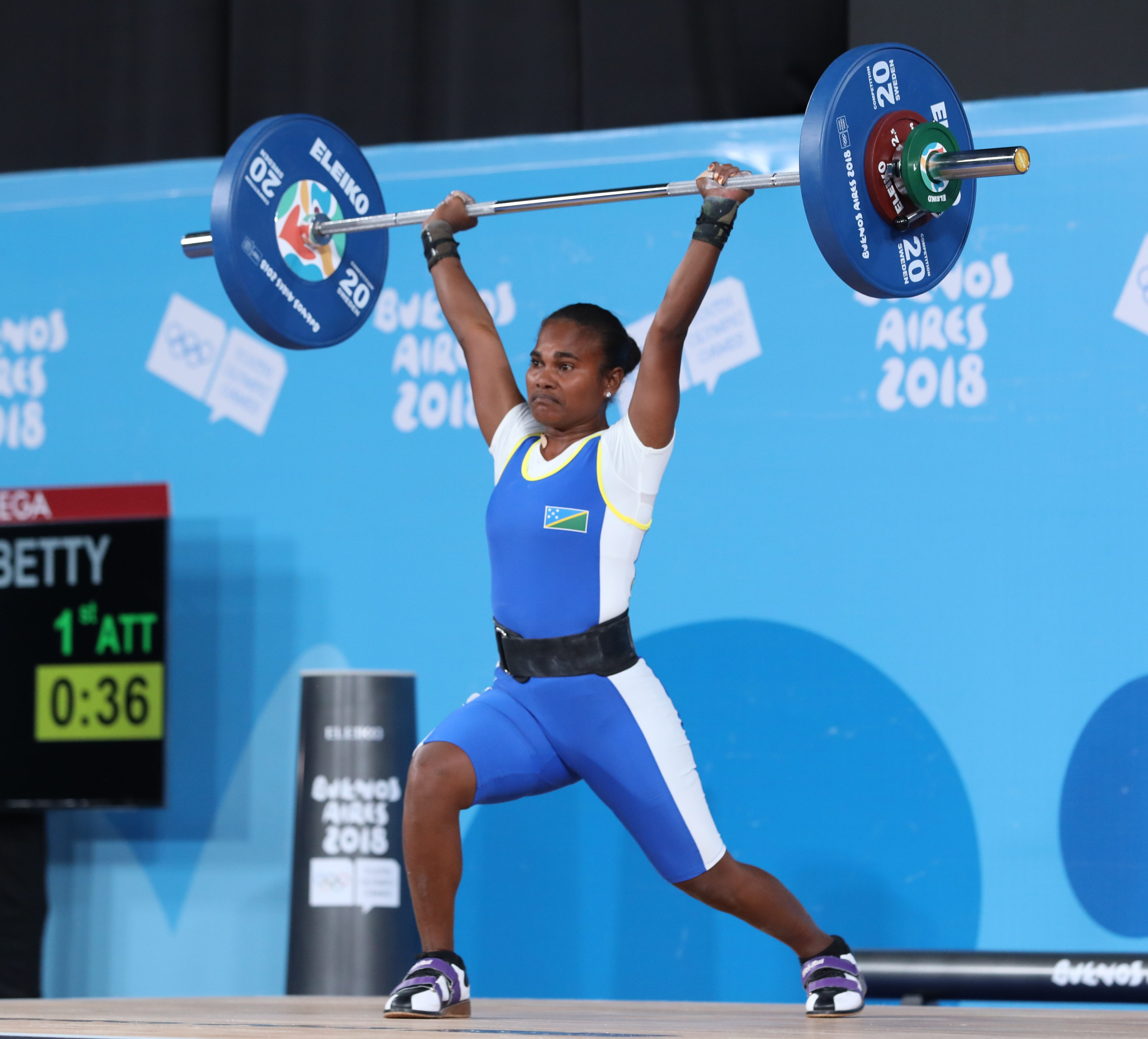
Betty Waneasi

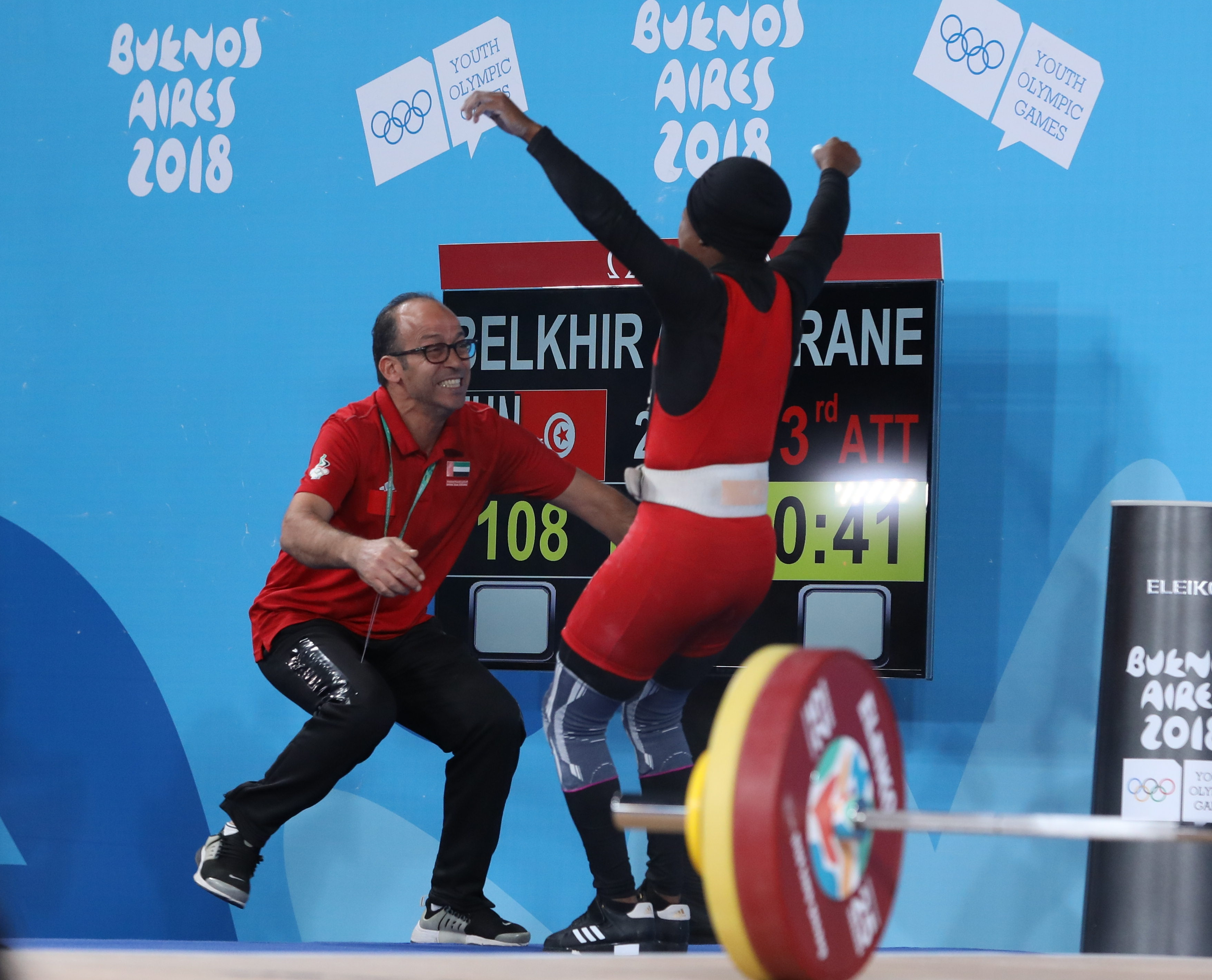
Ghofrane Belkhir (Youth Olympic Champion)

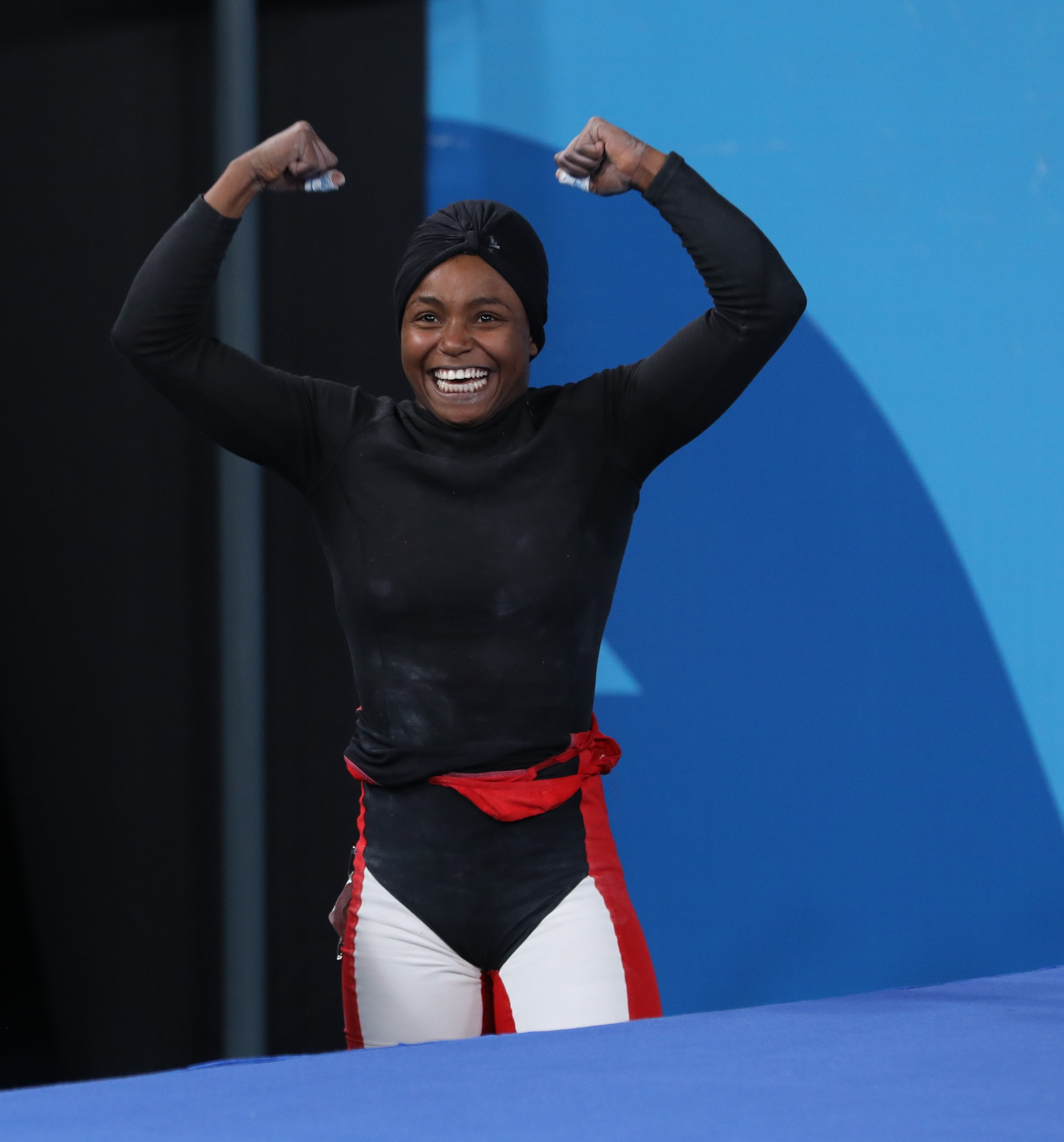
Ghofrane Belkhir (Youth Olympic Champion)

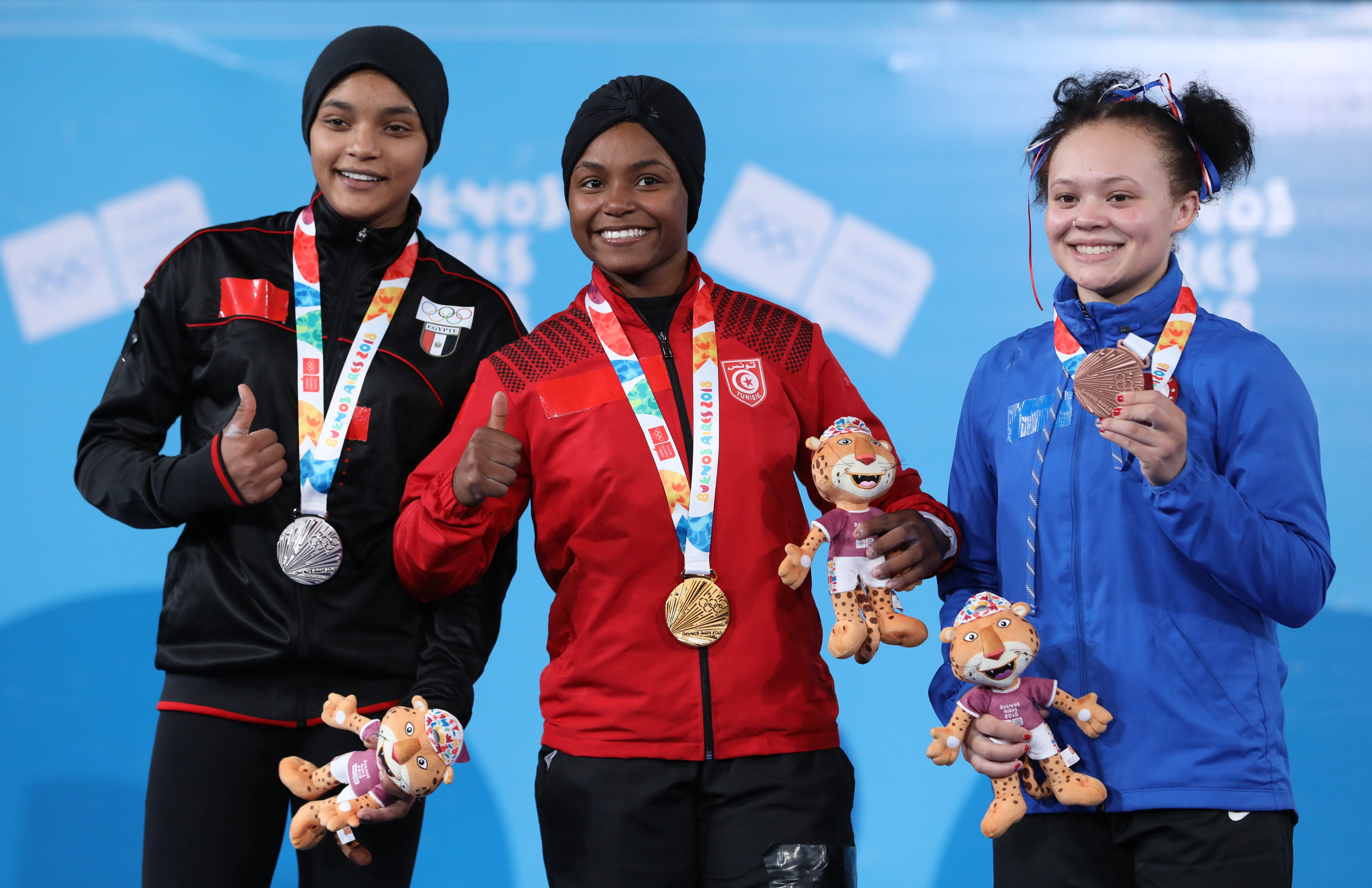
The medailists
