= Mary Osijo =

Nigerian weightlifter (born 1996)

Personal information
- Full name: Mary Taiwo Osijo F.R.M 2
- Born: 21 November 1996 (age 29)
- Weight: 83 kg (183 lb)

Sport
- Country: Nigeria
- Sport: Weightlifting
- Weight class: 87 kg (192 lb)
Medal record
	Commonwealth championship at Amedabad 2025
Representing Nigeria
African Championships
Gold medal – first place	2026 Ismailia	+86 kg
African Games
Gold medal – first place	2023 Accra	87 kg Clean & Jerk
Silver medal – second place	2023 Accra	87 kg Snatch
Silver medal – second place	2023 Accra	87 kg Total
Commonwealth Games {{Medal|Bronze|2022 Birmingham|[[Weightlifting at the 2022 Commonwealth championship at Mauritius 2022 –Gold }}

Mary Taiwo Osijo (born 21 November 1996) is a Nigerian weightlifter, who competes in the 87 kg category and represents Nigeria at international competitions. She won the silver medal in the women's 87 kg event at the 2023 African Games held in Accra, Ghana.

In August 2022, she won bronze at the 2022 Commonwealth Games.
