= Ghofrane Belkhir =

Tunisian weightlifter (born 2001)

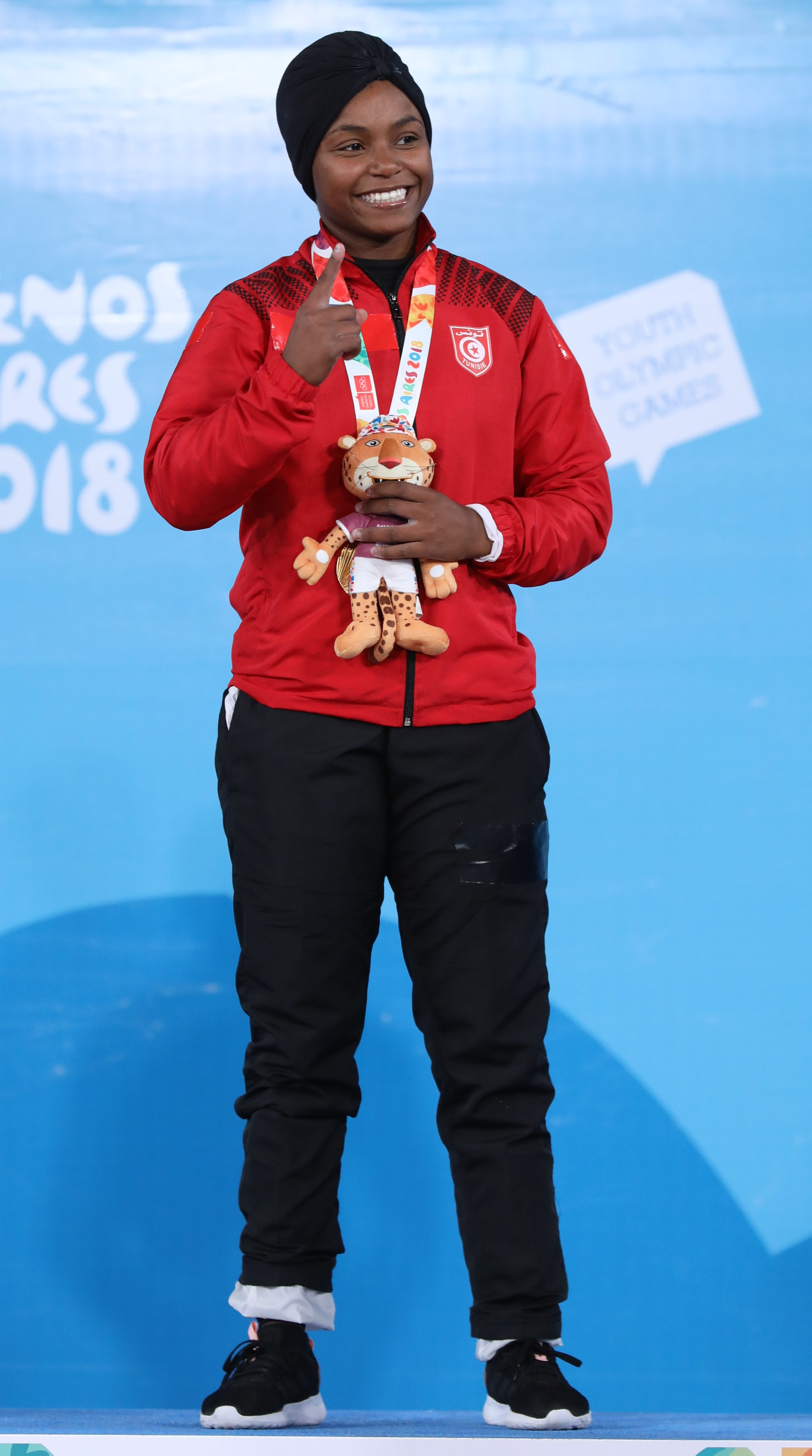
- Ghofrane Belkhir in 2018

Personal information
- Born: 11 August 2001 (age 24)

Sport
- Country: Tunisia
- Sport: Weightlifting
- Weight class: 59 kg
Medal record
Women's weightlifting
Representing Tunisia
World Championships
Gold medal – first place	2021 Tashkent	55 kg
Summer Youth Olympics
Gold medal – first place	2018 Buenos Aires	58 kg
African Weightlifting Championships
Gold medal – first place	2022 Cairo	59 kg
Silver medal – second place	2016 Yaoundé	63 kg
Silver medal – second place	2017 Vacoas	63 kg
Mediterranean Games
Gold medal – first place	2022 Oran	59 kg CJ
Junior World Weightlifting Championships
Gold medal – first place	2021 Tashkent	59 kg
Bronze medal – third place	2018 Tashkent	63 kg

Ghofrane Belkhir (born 11 August 2001) is a Tunisian weightlifter. She won the gold medal in the women's 55 kg event at the 2021 World Weightlifting Championships held in Tashkent, Uzbekistan. She also won the gold medal in the 58 kg event at the 2018 Summer Youth Olympics held in Buenos Aires, Argentina. Belkhir broke the world record for the snatch, clean and jerk, and total in the women's 59-kilogram class weightlifting event at the 5th International Solidarity Weightlifting Championship in Cairo, Egypt in December 2018. As of May 2020, she holds the African junior records for these events in the women's 59 kg weight class.

== Career ==
At the 2018 Mediterranean Games held in Tarragona, Spain, she won the gold medal in the 63 kg Snatch event and the bronze medal in the 63 kg Clean & Jerk event. At the 2019 African Weightlifting Championships in Cairo, Egypt, she competed in the women's 59 kg event where she failed to register a successful result in the Snatch event.

In 2021, Belkhir won the gold medal in the women's 59 kg event at the Junior World Weightlifting Championships held in Tashkent, Uzbekistan. She won the gold medal in the women's 59 kg Clean & Jerk event at the 2022 Mediterranean Games held in Oran, Algeria.

== Achievements ==
Year	Venue	Weight	Snatch (kg)				Clean & Jerk (kg)				Total	Rank
Year	Venue	Weight	1	2	3	Rank	1	2	3	Rank	Total	Rank
World Championships
2021	Tashkent, Uzbekistan	55 kg	90	92	—	1st place, gold medalist(s)	~~111~~	111	~~115~~	4	203	1st place, gold medalist(s)
2023	Riyadh, Saudi Arabia	59 kg	~~90~~	~~90~~	~~90~~	—	—	—	—	—	—	—
Mediterranean Games
2022	Oran, Algeria	59 kg	~~91~~	~~91~~	91	4	112	115	—	1st place, gold medalist(s)	—N/a	—N/a
