= Weightlifting at the 2026 Commonwealth Games – Men's 94 kg =

Weightlifting – Men's 94 kg at the 2026 Commonwealth Games
- Venue: SEC Armadillo
- Dates: 29 July 2026
- Competitors: 11 from 11 nations
- Winning time: 347 kg

Medalists
gold medal	Syahmi Nor Ghazali	Malaysia
silver medal	Alex Bellemarre	Canada
bronze medal	Oliver Saxton	Australia

The Men's 94 kg weightlifting event at the 2026 Commonwealth Games toke place at the SEC Armadillo, Glasgow on 29 July 2026. Malaysia's Syahmi Nor Ghazali won the gold medal ahead of Alex Bellemarre from Canada who took silver with Oliver Saxton of Australia claiming the bronze.

== Qualification ==
A total of 176 weightlifters (88 per gender) qualify to compete at the Games. Nations may earn one quota per weight class, allocated as follows:

- Automatic Qualification – Host CGA (1 per event)
- Direct Qualification – 2025 Commonwealth Weightlifting Champions (1 per event)
- IWF Commonwealth Ranking List (Ranking Period: 01 June 2025 – 18 May 2026) (8 per event)
- Bipartite Invitation (1 per event)

The following lifters qualified in the Men's 94 kg class:

Means of qualification	Quotas	Qualified
Host Nation	1	Tom Wright (SCO)
2025 Commonwealth Championships	1	Mohamad Syahmi (MAS)
IWF Commonwealth Rankings	8	Alex Bellemarre (CAN); Oliver Saxton (AUS); Dilbag Singh (IND); Forrester Osei (GHA); Daniel Onana Tanga (CMR); Joshua Hutton (ENG); Nicolaas du Plooy (RSA); Emmanuel Ulimasao (SAM)
Bipartite Invitation	1	Daniel Griffith (BAR)
TOTAL	11	

== Schedule ==
All times are British Summer Time (UTC+1)

Date	Time	Round
29 July 2026	14:00	Final

== Competition ==
Rank	Athlete	Body weight (kg)	Snatch (kg)				Clean & Jerk (kg)				Total
Rank	Athlete	Body weight (kg)	1	2	3	Result	1	2	3	Result	Total
1st place, gold medalist(s)	Syahmi Nor Ghazali (MAS)		~~150~~	150	~~153~~	150	197	~~205~~	~~205~~	197 GR	347
2nd place, silver medalist(s)	Alex Bellemarre (CAN)		155	159	~~162~~	159 GR	187	~~192~~	~~192~~	187	346
3rd place, bronze medalist(s)	Oliver Saxton (AUS)		150	156	~~160~~	156	~~180~~	180	~~191~~	180	336
4	Daniel Onana Tanga (CMR)		140	~~147~~	147	147	~~180~~	180	187	187	334
5	Forrester Osei (GHA)		145	148	~~153~~	148	180	~~185~~	~~185~~	180	328
6	Emmanuel Ulimasao (SAM)		140	144	~~148~~	144	~~175~~	175	180	180	324
7	Daniel Griffith (BAR)		118	124	131	131	158	165	~~171~~	165	296
—	Joshua Hutton (ENG)		149	~~153~~	153	153	~~173~~	—	—	—	—
—	Tom Wright (SCO)		140	144	~~148~~	144	~~166~~	~~166~~	~~166~~	—	—
—	Nicolaas du Plooy (RSA)		~~132~~	~~132~~	~~132~~	—	—	—	—	—	—
