= Adijat Olarinoye =

Nigerian weightlifter (born 1999)

Personal information
- Full name: Adijat Adenike Olarinoye MON
- Nationality: Nigerian
- Born: July 14, 1999 (age 26)

Sport
- Country: Nigeria
Medal record
Representing Nigeria
Women's weightlifting
Commonwealth Games
Gold medal – first place	2022 Birmingham	55 kg
World Championships
Silver medal – second place	2021 Tashkent	55 kg
African Games
Gold medal – first place	2019 Rabat	55 kg
Gold medal – first place	2023 Accra	55 kg
Islamic Solidarity Games
Silver medal – second place	2021 Konya	59 kg

Adijat Adenike Olarinoye (born 14 July 1999) is a Nigerian weightlifter. Representative of the Nigerian weightlifting federation. Best Female athlete 2020 & 2021 Mubarak Olarinoye

== Career ==
Born and raised in Lagos. She won the silver medal and 2 bronze medals in the women's 55 kg at the 2021 IWF Championship Uzbekistan (Best female athlete)She Won 3 gold medals at the 2020 Islamic Solidarity Championships held in Tashkent, Uzbekistan. She won 3 gold medals at the 2021 African champions held in Kenya ( Best Female athlete) 3 bronze medals at the 2022 Islamic solidarity games

She represented Nigeria at the 2019 African Games which is also her maiden African Games appearance and claimed three medals including two gold medals and silver medal in women's 55 kg weightlifting event.

She claimed gold medals in women's 55 kg and 55 kg clean jerk events along with a silver in 55 kg snatch event where she narrowly missed the gold medal to fellow compatriot Chika Amalaha. However she emerged as the gold medalist in the overall women's 55 kg event while Chika Amalaha settled for the silver medal. On 26 August 2019, Adijat also created a new African record in weightlifting in the clean and jerk category by lifting 116 kg during the 2019 African Games.

At the 2022 Commonwealth Games in Birmingham, UK she won the gold medal with 2 new Commonwealth Games Records: 92kg in snatch and 203 kg overall.

She won the gold medal in the women's 55 kg event at the 2023 African Games held in Accra, Ghana.
