= Ruth Nyong Asuquo =

Nigerian weightlifter (born 2006)

Ruth Asuquo Nyong
Personal information
- Born: 5 November 2006 (age 19) Nigeria

Sport
- Country: Nigeria
- Sport: Weightlifting
- Weight class: 48 kg

Achievements and titles
- National finals: 2024 Ogun
Medal record
Women's weightlifting
Representing Nigeria
African Championships
Gold medal – first place	2026 Ismailia	48 kg
Commonwealth Games
Silver medal – second place	2026 Glasgow	48 kg

Ruth Asuquo Nyong (born 5 November 2006) is a Nigerian weightlifter who competes internationally in the women's 48-kilogram category. She represented Nigeria at the 2026 Commonwealth Games in Glasgow, Scotland, where she won the silver medal in the women's 48 kg event. She previously won three gold medals at the 2026 African Weightlifting Championships in Ismailia, Egypt, and three medals at the 2024 Nigerian National Sports Festival in Ogun State, representing Rivers State.

== Early life ==
Nyong was born on 5 November 2006 and is from Ibiono Ibom Local Government Area of Akwa Ibom State, Nigeria. She began participating in sport during her primary and secondary school years. She initially competed in athletics, particularly sprint events. She later represented Akwa Ibom at state level, and won a gold and a silver medal at the National Youth Games before moving into weightlifting.

According to an interview published by The Nation in 2025, Nyong was encouraged to take up weightlifting by Nigerian weightlifter Edidiong Umoafia and received early coaching support from Andrew Ekannem.

== Athletics ==
Before concentrating on weightlifting, Nyong competed in sprint events. She represented Akwa Ibom in athletics and competed in the 200 metres at the Athletics Federation of Nigeria Golden League.

Her transition from athletics to weightlifting marked the beginning of her emergence as a national-level weightlifter. Nyong later competed for Rivers State at the National Sports Festival.
