= Weightlifting at the 2026 Commonwealth Games – Women's 48 kg =

Weightlifting – Women's 48 kg at the 2026 Commonwealth Games
- Venue: Scottish Event Campus
- Dates: 26 July 2026
- Competitors: 10 from 10 nations

Medalists
gold medal	Mirabai Chanu	India
silver medal	Ruth Nyong	Nigeria
bronze medal	Irene Jane Henry	Malaysia

The Women's 48 kg weightlifting event at the 2026 Commonwealth Games took place at the SEC Armadillo, Glasgow on 26 July 2026. India's Mirabai Chanu won the gold medal ahead of Ruth Nyong from Nigeria who took silver with Irene Jane Henry of Malaysia claiming the bronze.

== Qualification ==
A total of 176 weightlifters (88 per gender) qualify to compete at the Games. Nations may earn one quota per weight class, allocated as follows:

- Automatic Qualification – Host CGA (1 per event)
- Direct Qualification – 2025 Commonwealth Weightlifting Champions (1 per event)
- IWF Commonwealth Ranking List (Ranking Period: 01 June 2025 – 18 May 2026) (8 per event)
- Bipartite Invitation (1 per event)

The following lifters qualified in the Women's 48 kg class:

Means of qualification	Quotas	Qualified
Host Nation	1	Alex Mackay (SCO)
2025 Commonwealth Championships	1	Mirabai Chanu (IND)
IWF Commonwealth Rankings	8	Ruth Asouquo (NGR); Irene Jane Henry (MAS); Upamalika Jambulliye Gamladdalage (SRI); Tammy Wong (ENG); Jo-Beth Deireragea (NRU); Chloe Perkins (AUS); Nikole Roberts (WAL); Thelma Toua (PNG)
Bipartite Invitation	1	Janet Oduor (KEN)
TOTAL	11	

== Schedule ==
All times are British Summer Time (UTC+1)

Date	Time	Round
26 July 2026	09:00	Final

== Competition ==
Rank	Athlete	Body weight (kg)	Snatch (kg)				Clean & Jerk (kg)				Total
Rank	Athlete	Body weight (kg)	1	2	3	Result	1	2	3	Result	Total
1st place, gold medalist(s)	Mirabai Chanu (IND)		~~82~~	82	85	85 CR, GR	~~105~~	105	—	105 GR	190 GR
2nd place, silver medalist(s)	Ruth Nyong (NGR)		71	75	~~77~~	75	~~93~~	~~93~~	93	93	168
3rd place, bronze medalist(s)	Irene Jane Henry (MAS)		72	75	77	77	~~90~~	90	~~93~~	90	167
4	Jo-Beth Deireragea (NRU)		68	70	~~72~~	70	86	~~89~~	91	91	161
5	Tammy Wong (ENG)		68	71	~~73~~	71	89	~~92~~	~~93~~	89	160
6	Nikole Roberts (WAL)		67	70	~~73~~	70	80	84	~~88~~	84	154
7	Alex Mackay (SCO)		58	61	~~63~~	61	78	81	~~84~~	81	142
8	Janet Oduor (KEN)		~~58~~	~~58~~	58	58	~~75~~	~~75~~	75	75	133
―	U.J. Gamladdalage (SRI)		~~70~~	~~70~~	~~70~~	—	—	—	—	—	DNF
―	Thelma Toua (PNG)		~~62~~	~~63~~	~~63~~	—	—	—	—	—	DNF
