= Webstar Lukose =

Kenyan weightlifter

Personal information
- Full name: Webstar Ndoli Lukose
- Nickname: Ripper
- Nationality: Kenyan
- Born: 19 May 1989 (age 37) Kericho
- Height: 5 ft 7 in (170 cm)
- Weight: 76.37 kg (168.4 lb)

Sport
- Country: Kenya
- Sport: Weightlifting
- Weight class: 77 kg
- Team: National team
- Updated on 5 January 2018

Webstar Ndoli Lukose (born 19 May 1989) is a Kenyan male weightlifter, competing in the 77 kg category and representing Kenya at international competitions. He participated at the 2014 Commonwealth Games in the 77 kg event

== Major competitions ==
| Year | Venue | Weight | Snatch (kg) | | | | Clean & Jerk (kg) | | | | Total | Rank |
| Year | Venue | Weight | 1 | 2 | 3 | Rank | 1 | 2 | 3 | Rank | Total | Rank |
Commonwealth Games
| 2014 | Glasgow, Scotland | 77 kg | 101 | 107 | 110 | —N/a | 132 | ~~137~~ | ~~137~~ | —N/a | 242 | 21 |
