= 2026 African Weightlifting Championships =

- Venue: Suez Canal Authority Club, Suez Canal Stadium
- Location: Ismailia, Egypt
- Dates: 12–16 May

The 2026 African Weightlifting Championships were held in Ismailia, Egypt, from 12 to 16 May 2026.

== Medal table ==
Ranking by Big (Total result) medals

* Host nation (Egypt)

Rank	Nation	Gold	Silver	Bronze	Total
1	Egypt (EGY)*	7	5	2	14
2	Nigeria (NGR)	4	5	1	10
3	Tunisia (TUN)	3	1	6	10
4	Madagascar (MAD)	2	1	2	5
5	Algeria (ALG)	0	1	1	2
5	Libya (LBA)	0	1	1	2
7	Mauritius (MRI)	0	1	0	1
7	Morocco (MAR)	0	1	0	1
9	South Africa (RSA)	0	0	2	2
10	Cameroon (CMR)	0	0	1	1
Totals (10 entries)		16	16	16	48

Ranking by all medals: Big (Total result) and Small (Snatch and Clean & Jerk)

* Host nation (Egypt)

Rank	Nation	Gold	Silver	Bronze	Total
1	Egypt (EGY)*	20	17	5	42
2	Nigeria (NGR)	13	14	2	29
3	Tunisia (TUN)	8	2	16	26
4	Madagascar (MAD)	6	4	4	14
5	Mauritius (MRI)	1	2	0	3
6	Libya (LBA)	0	3	2	5
7	Morocco (MAR)	0	3	1	4
8	Algeria (ALG)	0	2	4	6
9	South Africa (RSA)	0	1	7	8
10	Cameroon (CMR)	0	0	6	6
11	Kenya (KEN)	0	0	1	1
Totals (11 entries)		48	48	48	144

== Medal overview ==
=== Men ===
Event		Gold		Silver		Bronze	
–60 kg	Snatch	Jean Ramiarimanana (MAD)	110 kg	Havotriniaina Rakotomandimby (MAD)	109 kg	Idriss Werthi (TUN)	108 kg
–60 kg	Clean & Jerk	Jean Ramiarimanana (MAD)	140 kg	Havotriniaina Rakotomandimby (MAD)	135 kg	Aman Allah Brini (TUN)	131 kg
–60 kg	Total	Jean Ramiarimanana (MAD)	250 kg	Havotriniaina Rakotomandimby (MAD)	244 kg	Idriss Werthi (TUN)	232 kg
–65 kg	Snatch	Noureldin Zaky (EGY)	132 kg	Favour Agboro (NGR)	123 kg	Amine Bouhijbha (TUN)	121 kg
–65 kg	Clean & Jerk	Noureldin Zaky (EGY)	157 kg	Favour Agboro (NGR)	156 kg	Amine Bouhijbha (TUN)	146 kg
–65 kg	Total	Noureldin Zaky (EGY)	288 kg	Favour Agboro (NGR)	280 kg	Amine Bouhijbha (TUN)	267 kg
–71 kg	Snatch	Edidiong Umoafia (NGR)	141 kg	Ahmed Said (EGY)	140 kg	Mohamed Sameer Masoud (LBA)	130 kg
–71 kg	Clean & Jerk	Ahmed Said (EGY)	180 kg AF	Edidiong Umoafia (NGR)	170 kg	Gerard Abeussa (CMR)	162 kg
–71 kg	Total	Ahmed Said (EGY)	320 kg	Edidiong Umoafia (NGR)	311 kg	Mohamed Sameer Masoud (LBA)	286 kg
–79 kg	Snatch	Tojonirina Andriantsitohaina (MAD)	142 kg	Adedapo Opadeji (NGR)	140 kg	Ayoub Salem (TUN)	140 kg
–79 kg	Clean & Jerk	Tojonirina Andriantsitohaina (MAD)	171 kg	Adedapo Opadeji (NGR)	170 kg	Jon-antohein Phillips (RSA)	167 kg
–79 kg	Total	Tojonirina Andriantsitohaina (MAD)	313 kg	Adedapo Opadeji (NGR)	310 kg	Ayoub Salem (TUN)	305 kg
–88 kg	Snatch	Abdelrahman Younes (EGY)	182 kg WR	Mohammed Al-Zintani (LBA)	160 kg	William Swart (RSA)	148 kg
–88 kg	Clean & Jerk	Abdelrahman Younes (EGY)	210 kg AF	Mohammed Al-Zintani (LBA)	200 kg	William Swart (RSA)	188 kg
–88 kg	Total	Abdelrahman Younes (EGY)	392 kg AF	Mohammed Al-Zintani (LBA)	360 kg	William Swart (RSA)	336 kg
–94 kg	Snatch	Karim Abokahla (EGY)	170 kg AF	Ahmed Ashour (EGY)	166 kg	Faris Touairi (ALG)	155 kg
–94 kg	Clean & Jerk	Karim Abokahla (EGY)	210 kg AF	Ahmed Ashour (EGY)	200 kg	Faris Touairi (ALG)	185 kg
–94 kg	Total	Karim Abokahla (EGY)	380 kg AF	Ahmed Ashour (EGY)	366 kg	Faris Touairi (ALG)	340 kg
–110 kg	Snatch	Mahmoud Hosny (EGY)	173 kg	Ahmed Gamal (EGY)	171 kg	Aymen Touairi (ALG)	165 kg
–110 kg	Clean & Jerk	Mahmoud Hosny (EGY)	212 kg	Aymen Touairi (ALG)	210 kg	Junior Ngadja Nyabeyeu (CMR)	208 kg
–110 kg	Total	Mahmoud Hosny (EGY)	385 kg	Aymen Touairi (ALG)	375 kg	Ahmed Gamal (EGY)	374 kg
+110 kg	Snatch	Aymen Bacha (TUN)	183 kg	Bilal Bouamr (MAR)	160 kg	Lucky Joseph (NGR)	145 kg
+110 kg	Clean & Jerk	Aymen Bacha (TUN)	213 kg	Bilal Bouamr (MAR)	192 kg	Christoffel Reeders (RSA)	171 kg
+110 kg	Total	Aymen Bacha (TUN)	396 kg	Bilal Bouamr (MAR)	352 kg	Lucky Joseph (NGR)	315 kg

=== Women ===
Event		Gold		Silver		Bronze	
–48 kg	Snatch	Ruth Asuquo (NGR)	74 kg	Tendry Rakotonoely (MAD)	60 kg	Maissa Khadhraoui (TUN)	59 kg
–48 kg	Clean & Jerk	Ruth Asuquo (NGR)	93 kg	Maissa Khadhraoui (TUN)	78 kg	Tendry Rakotonoely (MAD)	76 kg
–48 kg	Total	Ruth Asuquo (NGR)	167 kg	Maissa Khadhraoui (TUN)	137 kg	Tendry Rakotonoely (MAD)	136 kg
–53 kg	Snatch	Onome Didih (NGR)	87 kg	Merna El-Tantawi (EGY)	79 kg	Johanni Taljaard (RSA)	75 kg
–53 kg	Clean & Jerk	Onome Didih (NGR)	105 kg	Johanni Taljaard (RSA)	98 kg	Merna El-Tantawi (EGY)	98 kg
–53 kg	Total	Onome Didih (NGR)	192 kg	Merna El-Tantawi (EGY)	177 kg	Johanni Taljaard (RSA)	173 kg
–58 kg	Snatch	Rafiatu Lawal (NGR)	95 kg	Noura Essam (EGY)	87 kg	Eya Aouadi (TUN)	81 kg
–58 kg	Clean & Jerk	Rafiatu Lawal (NGR)	120 kg	Noura Essam (EGY)	108 kg	Eya Aouadi (TUN)	107 kg
–58 kg	Total	Rafiatu Lawal (NGR)	215 kg	Noura Essam (EGY)	195 kg	Eya Aouadi (TUN)	188 kg
–63 kg	Snatch	Chaima Rahmouni (TUN)	91 kg	Ruth Ayodele (NGR)	90 kg	Mercy Kerubo (KEN)	81 kg
–63 kg	Clean & Jerk	Chaima Rahmouni (TUN)	111 kg	Ruth Ayodele (NGR)	110 kg	Soloniaina Randriamparany (MAD)	100 kg
–63 kg	Total	Chaima Rahmouni (TUN)	202 kg	Ruth Ayodele (NGR)	200 kg	Soloniaina Randriamparany (MAD)	178 kg
–69 kg	Snatch	Ketty Lent (MRI)	92 kg	Shaima Abdelnasser (EGY)	89 kg	Hagar Roshdy (EGY)	88 kg
–69 kg	Clean & Jerk	Jawaher Gesmi (TUN)	118 kg	Ketty Lent (MRI)	112 kg	Shaima Abdelnasser (EGY)	111 kg
–69 kg	Total	Jawaher Gesmi (TUN)	205 kg	Ketty Lent (MRI)	204 kg	Shaima Abdelnasser (EGY)	200 kg
–77 kg	Snatch	Taiwo Liadi (NGR)	105 kg	Roufida Fathi (EGY)	96 kg	Ech-Chaibia Ech-Chachouiy (MAR)	90 kg
–77 kg	Clean & Jerk	Taiwo Liadi (NGR)	138 kg	Roufida Fathi (EGY)	131 kg	Eya Hosni (TUN)	113 kg
–77 kg	Total	Taiwo Liadi (NGR)	243 kg	Roufida Fathi (EGY)	227 kg	Eya Hosni (TUN)	199 kg
–86 kg	Snatch	Sara Ahmed (EGY)	108 kg	Mary Osijo (NGR)	95 kg	Zeineb Naoui (TUN)	92 kg
–86 kg	Clean & Jerk	Sara Ahmed (EGY)	151 kg AF	Mary Osijo (NGR)	116 kg	Rayssa Djifack (CMR)	112 kg
–86 kg	Total	Sara Ahmed (EGY)	259 kg	Mary Osijo (NGR)	211 kg	Zeineb Naoui (TUN)	199 kg
+86 kg	Snatch	Mayar Abdelkader (EGY)	104 kg	Fatma Mahmoud (EGY)	101 kg	Estelle Momeni (CMR)	80 kg
+86 kg	Clean & Jerk	Fatma Mahmoud (EGY)	135 kg	Mayar Abdelkader (EGY)	131 kg	Estelle Momeni (CMR)	97 kg
+86 kg	Total	Fatma Mahmoud (EGY)	236 kg	Mayar Abdelkader (EGY)	235 kg	Estelle Momeni (CMR)	177 kg
