= Karim Abokahla =

Egyptian weightlifter (born 1996)

Personal information
- Born: 11 November 1996 (age 29)

Sport
- Country: Egypt
- Sport: Weightlifting
- Weight class: 89 kg
Medal record
Men's weightlifting
Representing Egypt
World Championships
Gold medal – first place	2023 Riyadh	96 kg
African Games
Gold medal – first place	2019 Rabat	89 kg
African Championships
Gold medal – first place	2022 Cairo	96 kg
Gold medal – first place	2023 Tunis	89 kg
Gold medal – first place	2024 Ismailia	89 kg
Gold medal – first place	2026 Ismailia	94 kg
Mediterranean Games
Gold medal – first place	2026 Taranto	95 kg CJ
Silver medal – second place	2022 Oran	89 kg S
Silver medal – second place	2022 Oran	89 kg CJ
Bronze medal – third place	2026 Taranto	95 kg S

Karim Abokahla (Arabic: كريم أبو كحلة; born 11 November 1996) is an Egyptian weightlifter. He won the gold medal in the men's 96 kg event at the 2023 World Weightlifting Championships held in Riyadh, Saudi Arabia. He represented Egypt at the 2024 Summer Olympics in Paris, France.

== Career ==
Abokahla represented Egypt at the 2019 African Games held in Rabat, Morocco and he won the gold medal in the men's 89 kg event.

In 2021, Abokahla competed in the men's 89 kg event at the World Weightlifting Championships held in Tashkent, Uzbekistan. He won the silver medals in the men's 89 kg Snatch and Clean & Jerk events at the 2022 Mediterranean Games held in Oran, Algeria.

He won the gold medal in the men's 96 kg event at the 2023 World Weightlifting Championships held in Riyadh, Saudi Arabia.

In 2024, he competed in the men's 89 kg event at the 2024 Summer Olympics held in Paris, France. He lifted 165 kg in the Snatch to place eighth provisionally but didn't make any attempt in the Clean & Jerk.

== Achievements ==
Year	Venue	Weight	Snatch (kg)				Clean & Jerk (kg)				Total	Rank
Year	Venue	Weight	1	2	3	Rank	1	2	3	Rank	Total	Rank
Summer Olympics
2024	Paris, France	89 kg	165	~~170~~	~~170~~	—N/a	—	—	—	—N/a	DNF	—
World Championships
2021	Tashkent, Uzbekistan	89 kg	~~165~~	~~165~~	165	5	200	~~207~~	~~207~~	6	365	4
2023	Riyadh, Saudi Arabia	96 kg	169	172	174	2nd place, silver medalist(s)	~~208~~	208	213	1st place, gold medalist(s)	387	1st place, gold medalist(s)
IWF World Cup
2024	Phuket, Thailand	96 kg	165	~~171~~	~~171~~	2nd place, silver medalist(s)	205	—	—	2nd place, silver medalist(s)	370	2nd place, silver medalist(s)
African Games
2019	Rabat, Morocco	89 kg	152	160	164	1st place, gold medalist(s)	185	195	201	1st place, gold medalist(s)	365	1st place, gold medalist(s)
African Championships
2022	Cairo, Egypt	96 kg	145	—	—	1st place, gold medalist(s)	195	—	—	1st place, gold medalist(s)	340	1st place, gold medalist(s)
2023	Tunis, Tunisia	89 kg	162	~~167~~	167	1st place, gold medalist(s)	200	208	~~213~~	1st place, gold medalist(s)	375	1st place, gold medalist(s)
2024	Ismailia, Egypt	89 kg	165	170	—	1st place, gold medalist(s)	200	~~211~~	211	1st place, gold medalist(s)	381	1st place, gold medalist(s)
Mediterranean Games
2022	Oran, Algeria	89 kg	160	165	171	2nd place, silver medalist(s)	202	212	~~214~~	2nd place, silver medalist(s)	—N/a	—N/a
