= Syahmi Nor Ghazali =

Malaysian weightlifter (born 2004)

Personal information
- Full name: Mohamad Syahmi Nor Ghazali
- Born: 29 March 2004 (age 22)

Sport
- Country: Malaysia
- Sport: Weightlifting
- Weight class: 94 kg
Medal record
Men's weightlifting
Representing Malaysia
Commonwealth Games
| Gold medal – first place | 2026 Glasgow | 94 kg |

Mohamad Syahmi Nor Ghazali (born 29 March 2004) is a Malaysian weightlifter. He won a gold medal at the 2026 Commonwealth Games.

== Career ==
In July 2026, Syahmi competed at the 2026 Commonwealth Games and won a gold medal in the 94 kg event. He opened the event with 150 kg in the snatch. He followed it up with 197 kg in the clean and jerk, setting a Commonwealth Games record, before finishing with a total lift of 347 kg.
