= Neama Rahmani =

American lawyer and writer (born 1979)

- Born: 1979 (age 46–47); California, United States
- Occupations: Personal injury lawyer Writer
- Years active: 2002–present
- Notable work: Harvard to Hashtag (2022)
- Website: neamarahmani.com

Neama Rahmani (born 1979) is an American personal injury lawyer, writer, and former federal prosecutor. He is the co-founder and president of West Coast Trial Lawyers.

Rahmani is also a member of the UCLA Political Science Board of Advisors.

== Early life and education ==
Rahmani was born in 1979, in California, the son of Persian parents. He completed his BA in political science and government at UCLA in 1999 and received his JD from Harvard Law School in 2002. He was among the youngest to ever graduate Harvard Law School at 22 years old.

== Career ==
Rahmani was admitted to practice law in 2002. Subsequently, he began his career at O'Melveny & Myers, where he represented entities such as Disney, Marriott, and the Roman Catholic Church.

In 2010, Rahmani joined the United States Attorney's Office, where he prosecuted drug and human trafficking cases along the U.S.-Mexico border. Later, he served as the director of enforcement for the Los Angeles City Ethics Commission in 2012.

In 2014, Rahmani co-founded West Coast Trial Lawyers with Allen Patatanyan, a law firm that litigates against large corporations.

== Notable cases ==
Rahmani has represented Johnny Manziel and his wife, Bre Tiesi, in business and litigation matters, as well as Carmen Electra in a lawsuit against a former stylist accused of theft. He also defended fashion designer, Michael Costello, against accusations of using racial slurs on social media.

In 2023, Rahmani represented three dancers, Arianna Davis, Crystal Williams and Noelle Rodriguez, who sued Lizzo for sexual harassment and creating a hostile work environment. Rahmani's caseload also includes several notable lawsuits involving allegations of violence and misconduct. He sued Charlie Sheen following an alleged assault on a dental technician and represented the parents of Shayan Mazroei, who was fatally stabbed. Rahmani acted on behalf of two female inmates in Contra Costa County who claimed they had been raped by a sheriff's deputy. He filed a lawsuit against a pastor in Novato who allegedly coerced a woman into getting an abortion under the guise of providing counseling. Additionally, he is representing the family of an intellectually disabled man who died in a hot car, allegedly neglected by an Easter Seals employee. Rahmani also filed a whistleblower lawsuit against a Loyola Marymount University employee who claimed she was fired for refusing to assist a dean in misappropriating university funds.

Rahmani was also involved in a rape lawsuit against rapper Soulja Boy, representing a client under the pseudonym "Jane Doe."

In September 2023, rapper Kanye West was sued over issues related to a construction project at his multimillion-dollar beachfront mansion in Malibu. The lawsuit, filed in Los Angeles Superior Court, involves allegations of wrongful termination, unpaid wages, discrimination based on medical conditions, and endangering an employee by placing them in an unsafe work environment. Neama Rahmani, president of West Coast Employment Lawyers, is representing the plaintiff, Tony Saxon, who claims he was hired by Ye in September 2021 as a project manager and faced these issues during his tenure.

== Personal life ==
Rahmani is married and lives with his wife and children in Los Angeles.

== Bibliography ==
- Rahmani, Neama; Keating, Gina (2022). Harvard to Hashtag
