= 2023 World Weightlifting Championships – Men's 96 kg =

The men's 96 kilograms competition at the 2023 World Weightlifting Championships was held on 12 and 13 September 2023.

== Schedule ==
Date	Time	Event
12 September 2023	20:30	Group C
13 September 2023	14:00	Group B
13 September 2023	16:30	Group A

== Medalists ==
Event	Gold		Silver		Bronze	
Snatch	Qasim Al-Lami (IRQ)	175 kg	Karim Abokahla (EGY)	174 kg	Won Jong-beom (KOR)	172 kg
Clean & Jerk	Karim Abokahla (EGY)	213 kg	Won Jong-beom (KOR)	212 kg	Mahmoud Hassan (EGY)	209 kg
Total	Karim Abokahla (EGY)	387 kg	Won Jong-beom (KOR)	384 kg	Qasim Al-Lami (IRQ)	379 kg

== Records ==
Prior to this competition, the existing world records were as follows.

World record	Snatch	Lesman Paredes (COL)	187 kg	Tashkent, Uzbekistan	14 December 2021
World record	Clean & jerk	Tian Tao (CHN)	231 kg	Tokyo, Japan	7 July 2019
World record	Total	Sohrab Moradi (IRI)	416 kg	Ashgabat, Turkmenistan	7 November 2018

== Results ==
Rank	Athlete	Group	Snatch (kg)				Clean & Jerk (kg)				Total
Rank	Athlete	Group	1	2	3	Rank	1	2	3	Rank	Total
1st place, gold medalist(s)	Karim Abokahla (EGY)	A	169	172	174	2nd place, silver medalist(s)	~~208~~	208	213	1st place, gold medalist(s)	387
2nd place, silver medalist(s)	Won Jong-beom (KOR)	A	167	~~172~~	172	3rd place, bronze medalist(s)	209	~~211~~	212	2nd place, silver medalist(s)	384
3rd place, bronze medalist(s)	Qasim Al-Lami (IRQ)	A	170	173	175	1st place, gold medalist(s)	201	204	~~206~~	7	379
4	Mahmoud Hassan (EGY)	A	~~161~~	161	165	13	201	~~207~~	209	3rd place, bronze medalist(s)	374
5	Amir Hoghoughi (IRI)	A	166	~~169~~	~~170~~	11	206	~~210~~	~~212~~	5	372
6	Hakob Mkrtchyan (ARM)	A	164	~~168~~	~~168~~	14	~~208~~	208	~~216~~	4	372
7	Yeison López (COL)	B	160	167	171	4	~~200~~	200	~~205~~	11	371
8	Jhor Moreno (COL)	A	165	170	~~173~~	6	201	~~205~~	~~205~~	10	371
9	Pavel Khadasevich (AIN)	A	167	~~171~~	~~171~~	8	202	~~205~~	~~205~~	9	369
10	Davit Hovhannisyan (ARM)	A	168	~~172~~	~~172~~	7	~~200~~	200	~~212~~	12	368
11	Assylzhan Bektay (KAZ)	A	160	165	~~169~~	12	195	~~201~~	203	8	368
12	Boady Santavy (CAN)	B	160	166	~~169~~	10	186	192	196	13	362
13	Mohammad Zarei (IRI)	A	160	~~166~~	167	9	193	~~201~~	~~201~~	15	360
14	Sunnatilla Usarov (UZB)	B	~~163~~	163	~~171~~	15	~~190~~	190	~~196~~	17	353
15	Brandon Vautard (FRA)	B	142	~~147~~	147	23	200	~~205~~	205	6	352
16	Redon Manushi (FRA)	B	158	~~162~~	162	16	181	185	188	19	350
17	Amel Atencia (PER)	C	150	~~155~~	~~155~~	20	180	186	192	16	342
18	Cyrille Tchatchet (GBR)	B	150	~~154~~	~~154~~	21	189	~~195~~	~~198~~	18	339
19	Forrester Osei (GHA)	C	140	145	151	18	180	186	~~193~~	20	337
20	Lukas Kordušas (LTU)	C	141	146	~~150~~	24	173	178	182	21	328
21	Asem Al-Sallaj (JOR)	C	~~137~~	137	~~145~~	25	177	~~183~~	~~185~~	22	314
22	Vishal Sing Bist (NEP)	C	120	126	~~133~~	26	155	162	165	23	291
23	James Daley (JAM)	C	104	108	~~110~~	27	130	~~135~~	135	24	243
—	Şahzadbek Matýakubow (TKM)	B	~~163~~	~~163~~	~~164~~	—	187	193	~~201~~	14	—
—	Sarat Sumpradit (THA)	B	170	~~175~~	~~180~~	5	~~205~~	—	—	—	—
—	José López (MEX)	B	147	152	155	17	~~195~~	~~195~~	~~196~~	—	—
—	Theodoros Iakovidis (GRE)	B	~~151~~	151	~~155~~	19	~~180~~	~~181~~	~~185~~	—	—
—	Alisher Seitkazy (KAZ)	B	~~150~~	150	~~157~~	22	~~190~~	~~190~~	—	—	—
—	Nathan Damron (USA)	B	—	—	—	—	—	—	—	—	—
