= 2021 World Weightlifting Championships – Women's 55 kg =

Weightlifting Championship

The women's 55 kilograms competition at the 2021 World Weightlifting Championships was held on 9 December 2021.

== Schedule ==
Date	Time	Event
9 December 2021	13:00	Group B
9 December 2021	16:00	Group A

== Medalists ==
Event	Gold		Silver		Bronze	
Snatch	Ghofrane Belkhir (TUN)	92 kg	Svitlana Samuliak (UKR)	91 kg	Adijat Olarinoye (NGR)	90 kg
Clean & Jerk	Bindyarani Devi (IND)	114 kg	Ham Eun-ji (KOR)	114 kg	Adijat Olarinoye (NGR)	113 kg
Total	Ghofrane Belkhir (TUN)	203 kg	Adijat Olarinoye (NGR)	203 kg	Svitlana Samuliak (UKR)	201 kg

== Records ==
Prior to this competition, the existing world records were as follows.

World record	Snatch	Li Yajun (CHN)	102 kg	Ashgabat, Turkmenistan	3 November 2018
World record	Clean & jerk	Liao Qiuyun (CHN)	129 kg	Pattaya, Thailand	20 September 2019
World record	Total	Liao Qiuyun (CHN)	227 kg	Pattaya, Thailand	20 September 2019

== Results ==
Rank	Athlete	Group	Snatch (kg)				Clean & Jerk (kg)				Total
Rank	Athlete	Group	1	2	3	Rank	1	2	3	Rank	Total
1st place, gold medalist(s)	Ghofrane Belkhir (TUN)	A	90	92	—	1st place, gold medalist(s)	~~111~~	111	~~115~~	4	203
2nd place, silver medalist(s)	Adijat Olarinoye (NGR)	A	88	~~90~~	90	3rd place, bronze medalist(s)	110	113	~~115~~	3rd place, bronze medalist(s)	203
3rd place, bronze medalist(s)	Svitlana Samuliak (UKR)	A	88	90	91	2nd place, silver medalist(s)	105	108	110	5	201
4	Bindyarani Devi (IND)	B	78	82	84	9	108	~~112~~	114	1st place, gold medalist(s)	198
5	Fraer Morrow (GBR)	A	82	85	88	5	106	~~109~~	~~111~~	6	194
6	Ham Eun-ji (KOR)	A	80	~~85~~	~~85~~	16	109	~~113~~	114	2nd place, silver medalist(s)	194
7	Garance Rigaud (FRA)	A	82	85	88	6	~~102~~	102	105	9	193
8	Svetlana Ershova (RWF)	A	85	~~88~~	~~88~~	8	105	~~110~~	~~110~~	8	190
9	Jennifer Hernández (ECU)	B	80	83	85	7	103	~~106~~	~~106~~	10	188
10	Juliana Klarisa (INA)	A	80	83	~~85~~	11	105	~~108~~	~~108~~	7	188
11	Olha Ivzhenko (UKR)	A	81	83	~~86~~	12	100	103	~~105~~	11	186
12	Scheila Meister (SUI)	B	79	81	83	10	99	101	~~104~~	14	184
13	Atenery Hernández (ESP)	B	~~82~~	~~82~~	82	14	102	~~104~~	~~104~~	12	184
14	Katrine Bruhn (DEN)	B	74	79	82	13	97	101	~~104~~	13	183
15	Jamila Panfilova (UZB)	A	82	~~86~~	~~86~~	15	98	~~101~~	~~101~~	15	180
16	Tenishia Thornton (MLT)	B	71	73	~~75~~	17	86	89	~~92~~	18	162
17	Sandra Jensen (DEN)	B	72	~~75~~	~~76~~	18	~~86~~	86	90	17	162
18	Chamari Warnakulasuriya (SRI)	B	~~70~~	70	~~73~~	20	85	90	~~95~~	16	160
19	Sky Norris (JAM)	B	70	~~73~~	~~73~~	19	83	86	~~88~~	19	156
20	Sandra Owusu (GHA)	B	63	66	~~72~~	21	75	~~77~~	77	21	143
21	Srity Akter (BAN)	B	62	~~65~~	65	22	75	78	~~83~~	20	143
22	Caroline Wangechi (KEN)	B	50	~~55~~	~~55~~	23	60	65	~~70~~	22	115
—	Evagjelia Veli (ALB)	A	86	89	~~91~~	4	~~105~~	~~105~~	—	—	—
