= Forrester Osei =

Ghanaian weightlifter (born 1989)

Personal information
- Full name: Forrester Christopher Osei
- Nationality: Ghanaian
- Born: 12 September 1989 (age 36) London, England

Sport
- Country: Ghana
- Sport: Weightlifting
- Event: Men's +94 kg
Medal record
Men's weightlifting
Representing Ghana
Commonwealth Championships
| Gold medal – first place | 2016 Penang | 96 kg |
- Updated on 14 March 2022

Forrester Christopher Osei (born 12 September 1989) is a Ghanaian weightlifter, competing in the 94 kg category and representing Ghana at international competitions. He competed at 2016 Commonwealth Weightlifting Championships and won gold in his weight division. He competed at World Weightlifting Championships in 2015, 2017, 2019, and 2021. He also competed at the 2019 African Games. He is an executive board member of the International Weightlifting Federation. He is also the Vice Chair of the IWF Athletes' Commission
