= Neama Said =

Egyptian weightlifter (born 2002)

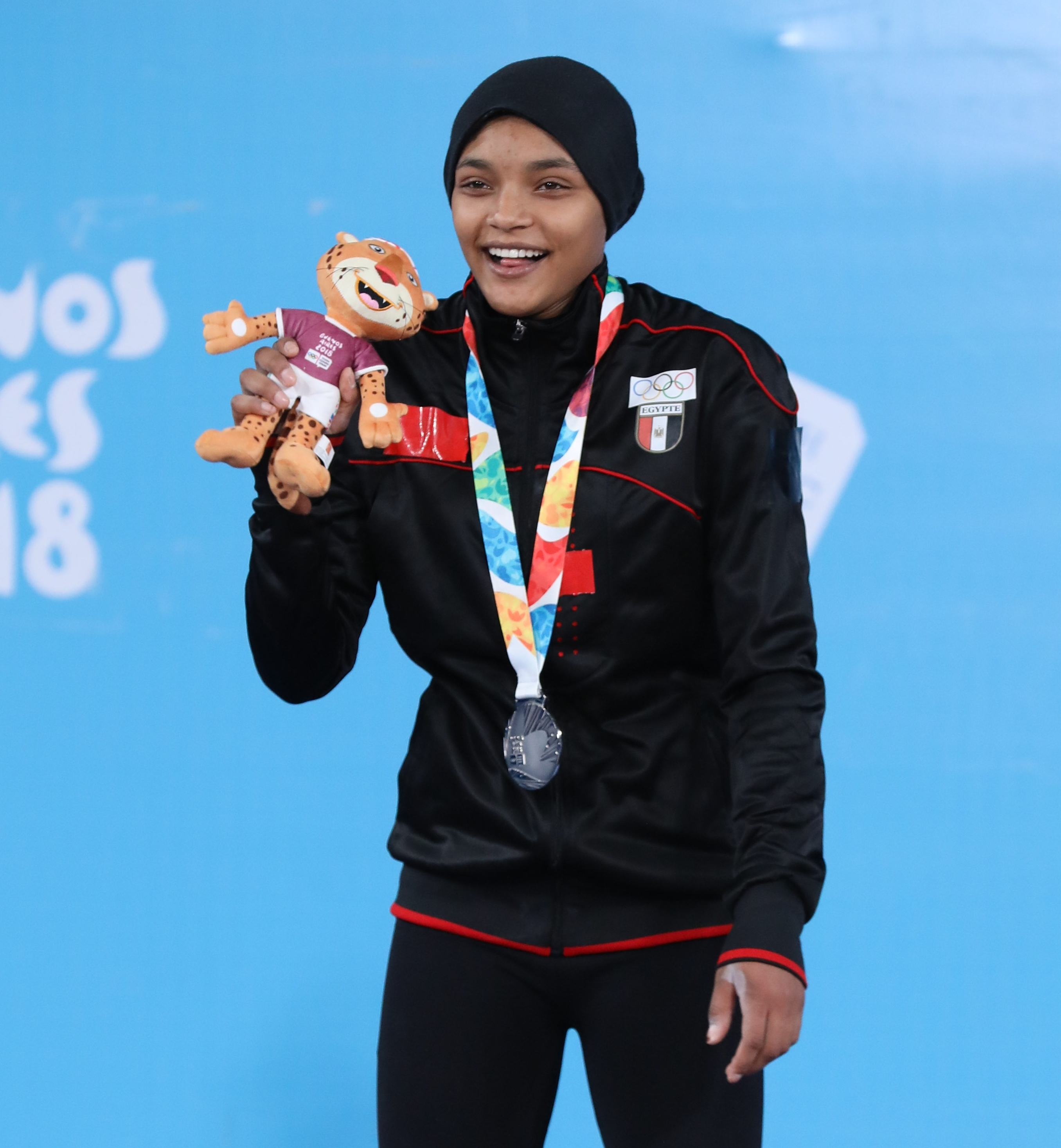
- Neama Said in 2018

Personal information
- Full name: Neama Said Fahmi Said
- Born: 15 November 2002 (age 23)

Sport
- Country: Egypt
- Sport: Weightlifting
- Weight class: 64 kg; 71 kg
- Club: Al-Qassasin Center
Medal record
Women's weightlifting
Representing Egypt
World Championships
Gold medal – first place	2021 Tashkent	64 kg
African Games
Bronze medal – third place	2019 Rabat	64 kg
African Weightlifting Championships
Gold medal – first place	2022 Cairo	71 kg
Gold medal – first place	2023 Tunis	71 kg
Gold medal – first place	2024 Ismailia	76 kg
Silver medal – second place	2019 Cairo	64 kg
Mediterranean Games
Gold medal – first place	2022 Oran	71 kg S
Gold medal – first place	2022 Oran	71 kg CJ
Summer Youth Olympics
Silver medal – second place	2018 Buenos Aires	58 kg
Junior World Championships
Gold medal – first place	2022 Heraklion	71 kg
Youth World Championships
Gold medal – first place	2019 Las Vegas	59 kg

Neama Said Fahmi Said (born 15 November 2002) is an Egyptian weightlifter. She won the gold medal in the women's 64 kg event at the 2021 World Weightlifting Championships held in Tashkent, Uzbekistan. She represented Egypt at the 2024 Summer Olympics in Paris, France.

== Career ==
In 2018, she won the silver medal in the girls' 58 kg event at the Summer Youth Olympics held in Buenos Aires, Argentina.

In 2019, at the Youth World Weightlifting Championship held in Las Vegas, United States, she won the gold medal in the women's 59 kg event. At the 2019 African Weightlifting Championships in Cairo, Egypt, she won the silver medal in the women's 64 kg event. She also set new African youth records at this competition for the Snatch, Clean & Jerk and Total events.

In that same year, she also represented Egypt at the 2019 African Games held in Rabat, Morocco and she won the bronze medal in the women's 64 kg event. She also won the silver medal in the Clean & Jerk event and the bronze medal in the Snatch event.

She won the gold medal in her event at the 2022 Junior World Weightlifting Championships held in Heraklion, Greece. She won the gold medal in the women's 71 kg Snatch and Clean & Jerk events at the 2022 Mediterranean Games held in Oran, Algeria.

In 2023, she finished in 4th place in the women's 71 kg event at the World Weightlifting Championships held in Riyadh, Saudi Arabia. In 2024, she competed in the women's 71 kg event at the 2024 Summer Olympics held in Paris, France. She lifted 222 kg in total and placed ninth.

== Achievements ==
Year	Venue	Weight	Snatch (kg)				Clean & Jerk (kg)				Total	Rank
Year	Venue	Weight	1	2	3	Rank	1	2	3	Rank	Total	Rank
Olympic Games
2024	Paris, France	71 kg	97	~~101~~	~~102~~	—N/a	120	125	—	—N/a	222	9
World Championships
2021	Tashkent, Uzbekistan	64 kg	100	103	106	1st place, gold medalist(s)	124	127	~~132~~	2nd place, silver medalist(s)	233	1st place, gold medalist(s)
2023	Riyadh, Saudi Arabia	71 kg	106	~~109~~	110	4	130	~~135~~	136	5	246	4
African Games
2019	Rabat, Morocco	64 kg	90	~~95~~	~~95~~	3rd place, bronze medalist(s)	110	117	~~122~~	2nd place, silver medalist(s)	207	3rd place, bronze medalist(s)
African Championships
2019	Cairo, Egypt	64 kg	83	88	91	2nd place, silver medalist(s)	104	109	111	1st place, gold medalist(s)	202	2nd place, silver medalist(s)
2022	Cairo, Egypt	71 kg	98	104	~~108~~	1st place, gold medalist(s)	123	~~128~~	~~130~~	1st place, gold medalist(s)	227	1st place, gold medalist(s)
2023	Tunis, Tunisia	71 kg	100	103	~~105~~	1st place, gold medalist(s)	122	126	~~130~~	1st place, gold medalist(s)	229	1st place, gold medalist(s)
2024	Ismailia, Egypt	76 kg	95	100	~~105~~	1st place, gold medalist(s)	120	125	130	1st place, gold medalist(s)	230	1st place, gold medalist(s)
Mediterranean Games
2022	Oran, Algeria	71 kg	~~100~~	~~101~~	101	1st place, gold medalist(s)	121	125	—	1st place, gold medalist(s)	—N/a	—N/a
