= List of Azerbaijani records in Olympic weightlifting =

The following are the national records in Olympic weightlifting in Azerbaijan. Records are maintained in each weight class for the snatch lift, clean and jerk lift, and the total for both lifts by the Azerbaijan Weightlifting Federation (AAAF).

== Current records ==
=== Men ===
Event	Record	Athlete	Date	Meet	Place	Ref
60 kg
Snatch						
Clean & Jerk						
Total						
65 kg
Snatch	128 kg	Tehran Mammadov	9 November 2025	Islamic Solidarity Games	Riyadh, Saudi Arabia	
Clean & Jerk	150 kg	Tehran Mammadov	9 November 2025	Islamic Solidarity Games	Riyadh, Saudi Arabia	
Total	278 kg	Tehran Mammadov	9 November 2025	Islamic Solidarity Games	Riyadh, Saudi Arabia	
71 kg
Snatch	147 kg	Isa Rustamov	9 November 2025	Islamic Solidarity Games	Riyadh, Saudi Arabia	
Clean & Jerk	177 kg	Isa Rustamov	9 November 2025	Islamic Solidarity Games	Riyadh, Saudi Arabia	
Total	324 kg	Isa Rustamov	9 November 2025	Islamic Solidarity Games	Riyadh, Saudi Arabia	
79 kg
Snatch	155 kg	Ravin Almammadov	10 November 2025	Islamic Solidarity Games	Riyadh, Saudi Arabia	
Clean & Jerk	190 kg	Ravin Almammadov	10 November 2025	Islamic Solidarity Games	Riyadh, Saudi Arabia	
Total	345 kg	Ravin Almammadov	10 November 2025	Islamic Solidarity Games	Riyadh, Saudi Arabia	
88 kg
Snatch						
Clean & Jerk						
Total						
94 kg
Snatch						
Clean & Jerk						
Total						
110 kg
Snatch	180 kg	Dadash Dadashbayli	12 November 2025	Islamic Solidarity Games	Riyadh, Saudi Arabia	
Clean & Jerk	211 kg	Dadash Dadashbayli	12 November 2025	Islamic Solidarity Games	Riyadh, Saudi Arabia	
Total	391 kg	Dadash Dadashbayli	12 November 2025	Islamic Solidarity Games	Riyadh, Saudi Arabia	
+110 kg
Snatch	170 kg	Ali Shukurlu	12 November 2025	Islamic Solidarity Games	Riyadh, Saudi Arabia	
Clean & Jerk	200 kg	Ali Shukurlu	12 November 2025	Islamic Solidarity Games	Riyadh, Saudi Arabia	
Total	370 kg	Ali Shukurlu	12 November 2025	Islamic Solidarity Games	Riyadh, Saudi Arabia	

=== Women ===
Event	Record	Athlete	Date	Meet	Place	Ref
48 kg
Snatch	65 kg	Nuray Abilova	8 November 2025	Islamic Solidarity Games	Riyadh, Saudi Arabia	
Clean & Jerk	79 kg	Nuray Abilova	8 November 2025	Islamic Solidarity Games	Riyadh, Saudi Arabia	
Total	144 kg	Nuray Abilova	8 November 2025	Islamic Solidarity Games	Riyadh, Saudi Arabia	
53 kg
Snatch	79 kg	Seljan Garayeva	8 November 2025	Islamic Solidarity Games	Riyadh, Saudi Arabia	
Clean & Jerk	100 kg	Seljan Garayeva	8 November 2025	Islamic Solidarity Games	Riyadh, Saudi Arabia	
Total	179 kg	Seljan Garayeva	8 November 2025	Islamic Solidarity Games	Riyadh, Saudi Arabia	
58 kg
Snatch						
Clean & Jerk						
Total						
63 kg
Snatch						
Clean & Jerk						
Total						
69 kg
Snatch						
Clean & Jerk						
Total						
77 kg
Snatch	84 kg	Fazila Imanova	11 November 2025	Islamic Solidarity Games	Riyadh, Saudi Arabia	
Clean & Jerk	105 kg	Fazila Imanova	11 November 2025	Islamic Solidarity Games	Riyadh, Saudi Arabia	
Total	189 kg	Fazila Imanova	11 November 2025	Islamic Solidarity Games	Riyadh, Saudi Arabia	
86 kg
Snatch	96 kg	Rahila Huseynzada	11 November 2025	Islamic Solidarity Games	Riyadh, Saudi Arabia	
Clean & Jerk	120 kg	Rahila Huseynzada	11 November 2025	Islamic Solidarity Games	Riyadh, Saudi Arabia	
Total	216 kg	Rahila Huseynzada	11 November 2025	Islamic Solidarity Games	Riyadh, Saudi Arabia	
+86 kg
Snatch						
Clean & Jerk						
Total						

== Historical records ==
=== Men (2018–2025) ===
Event	Record	Athlete	Date	Meet	Place	Ref
55 kg
Snatch	110 kg	Standard				
Clean & Jerk	130 kg	Standard				
Total	240 kg	Standard				
61 kg
Snatch	120 kg	Tehran Mammadov	17 October 2022	European Junior Championships	Durrës, Albania	
Clean & Jerk	141 kg	Tehran Mammadov	17 October 2022	European Junior Championships	Durrës, Albania	
Total	261 kg	Tehran Mammadov	17 October 2022	European Junior Championships	Durrës, Albania	
67 kg
Snatch	138 kg	Isa Rustamov	15 May 2023		Tunis, Tunisia	
Clean & Jerk	164 kg	Isa Rustamov	15 May 2023		Tunis, Tunisia	
Total	302 kg	Isa Rustamov	15 May 2023		Tunis, Tunisia	
73 kg
Snatch	153 kg	Omar Javadov	4 April 2024	World Cup	Phuket, Thailand	
Clean & Jerk	182 kg	Isa Rustamov	26 January 2025	Azerbaijani Championships	Baku, Azerbaijan	
Total	328 kg	Omar Javadov	4 April 2024	World Cup	Phuket, Thailand	
81 kg
Snatch	158 kg	Omar Javadov	15 September 2024	Azerbaijani Championships	Baku, Azerbaijan	
Clean & Jerk	187 kg	Ravin Almammadov	30 October 2024	European Junior Championships	Raszyn, Poland	
Total	338 kg	Omar Javadov	15 September 2024	Azerbaijani Championships	Baku, Azerbaijan	
89 kg
Snatch	150 kg	Standard				
Clean & Jerk	185 kg	Standard				
Total	335 kg	Standard				
96 kg
Snatch	160 kg	Standard				
Clean & Jerk	191 kg	Tarmenkhan Babayev	25 October 2019	European Junior Championships	Bucharest, Romania	
Total	350 kg	Standard				
102 kg
Snatch	177 kg	Dadash Dadashbayli	10 April 2021	European Championships	Moscow, Russia	
Clean & Jerk	210 kg	Dadash Dadashbayli	15 August 2022	Islamic Solidarity Games	Konya, Turkey	
Total	384 kg	Dadash Dadashbayli	15 August 2022	Islamic Solidarity Games	Konya, Turkey	
109 kg
Snatch	183 kg	Dadash Dadashbayli	14 December 2024	World Championships	Manama, Bahrain	
Clean & Jerk	223 kg	Dadash Dadashbayli	16 September 2023	World Championships	Riyadh, Saudi Arabia	
Total	404 kg	Dadash Dadashbayli	14 December 2024	World Championships	Manama, Bahrain	
+109 kg
Snatch	180 kg	Dadash Dadashbayli	17 December 2023	Azerbaijani Cup	Baku, Azerbaijan	
Clean & Jerk	220 kg	Dadash Dadashbayli	17 December 2023	Azerbaijani Cup	Baku, Azerbaijan	
Total	400 kg	Dadash Dadashbayli	17 December 2023	Azerbaijani Cup	Baku, Azerbaijan	

=== Women (2018–2025) ===
Event	Record	Athlete	Date	Meet	Place	Ref
45 kg
Snatch	65 kg	Standard				
Clean and Jerk	75 kg	Standard				
Total	140 kg	Standard				
49 kg
Snatch	65 kg	Standard				
Clean and Jerk	85 kg	Standard				
Total	150 kg	Standard				
55 kg
Snatch	80 kg	Sabina Azimova	20 October 2019	European Junior Championships	Bucharest, Romania	
Clean and Jerk	105 kg	Sabina Azimova	20 October 2019	European Junior Championships	Bucharest, Romania	
Total	185 kg	Sabina Azimova	20 October 2019	European Junior Championships	Bucharest, Romania	
59 kg
Snatch	75 kg	Standard				
Snatch	101 kg	Boyanka Kostova	December 2019	Qatar Cup	Doha, Qatar	
Clean and Jerk	95 kg	Standard				
Clean and Jerk	120 kg	Boyanka Kostova	December 2019	Qatar Cup	Doha, Qatar	
Total	170 kg	Standard				
Total	221 kg	Boyanka Kostova	December 2019	Qatar Cup	Doha, Qatar	
64 kg
Snatch	80 kg	Standard				
Clean and Jerk	100 kg	Standard				
Total	180 kg	Standard				
71 kg
Snatch	90 kg	Standard				
Clean and Jerk	105 kg	Standard				
Total	195 kg	Standard				
76 kg
Snatch	111 kg	Gunel Valiyeva	28 April 2023	Azerbaijani Championships	Baku, Azerbaijan	
Clean and Jerk	136 kg	Gunel Valiyeva	28 April 2023	Azerbaijani Championships	Baku, Azerbaijan	
Total	247 kg	Gunel Valiyeva	28 April 2023	Azerbaijani Championships	Baku, Azerbaijan	
81 kg
Snatch	95 kg	Standard				
Clean and Jerk	115 kg	Standard				
Total	210 kg	Standard				
87 kg
Snatch	100 kg	Standard				
Clean and Jerk	120 kg	Standard				
Total	220 kg	Standard				
+87 kg
Snatch	100 kg	Standard				
Clean and Jerk	120 kg	Standard				
Total	220 kg	Standard				

== Historical records ==
=== Men (1998–2018) ===
Event	Record	Athlete	Date	Meet	Place	Ref
56 kg
Snatch	125 kg	Valentin Hristov	9 April 2012	European Championships	Antalya, Turkey	
Clean and jerk	155 kg	Valentin Hristov	9 April 2012	European Championships	Antalya, Turkey	
Total	280 kg	Valentin Hristov	9 April 2012	European Championships	Antalya, Turkey	
62 kg
Snatch	135 kg					
Clean & Jerk	165 kg	Elkhan Suleymanov	April 2000	European Championships	Sofia, Bulgaria	
Total	298 kg	Zulfugar Suleymanov	21 November 2009	World Championships	Goyang, South korea	
69 kg
Snatch	155 kg	Turan Mirzayev	April 2003	European Championships	Loutraki, Greece	
Clean & Jerk	185 kg	Turan Mirzayev	April 2003	European Championships	Loutraki, Greece	
Total	340 kg	Turan Mirzayev	April 2003	European Championships	Loutraki, Greece	
77 kg
Snatch	160 kg	R. Musayev	November 1999		Baku, Azerbaijan	
Clean and jerk	190 kg	R. Musayev	November 1999		Baku, Azerbaijan	
Total	350 kg	R. Musayev	November 1999		Baku, Azerbaijan	
85 kg
Snatch	170 kg	Intigam Zairov	26 November 2009	World Championships	Goyang, South korea	
Clean and jerk	203 kg	Nizami Pashayev	23 September 2000	Olympic Games	Sydney, Australia	
Total	373 kg	Intigam Zairov	26 November 2009	World Championships	Goyang, South korea	
94 kg
Snatch	185 kg	Nizami Pashayev	15 November 2005	World Championships	Doha, Qatar	
Clean and jerk	222 kg	Nizami Pashayev	9 November 2001	World Championships	Antalya, Turkey	
Total	405 kg	Nizami Pashayev	9 November 2001	World Championships	Antalya, Turkey	
105 kg
Snatch	190 kg	Alan Naniyev	24 August 2004	Olympic Games	Athens, Greece	
Clean and jerk	220 kg	Alan Naniyev	24 August 2004	Olympic Games	Athens, Greece	
Total	410 kg	Alan Naniyev	24 August 2004	Olympic Games	Athens, Greece	
+105 kg
Snatch	192 kg	Alan Naniyev	April 2003	European Championships	Loutraki, Greece	
Clean and jerk	230 kg	Alan Naniyev	April 2003	European Championships	Loutraki, Greece	
Total	422 kg	Alan Naniyev	April 2003	European Championships	Loutraki, Greece	

=== Women (1998–2018) ===
Event	Record	Athlete	Date	Meet	Place	Ref
48 kg
Snatch	66 kg	Marziyya Maharramova	13 May 2017	Islamic Solidarity Games	Baku, Azerbaijan	
Clean and jerk	85 kg	Marziyya Maharramova	13 May 2017	Islamic Solidarity Games	Baku, Azerbaijan	
Total	151 kg	Marziyya Maharramova	13 May 2017	Islamic Solidarity Games	Baku, Azerbaijan	
53 kg
Snatch	75 kg	Sabina Azimova	13 May 2017	Islamic Solidarity Games	Baku, Azerbaijan	
Clean and jerk	101 kg	Sabina Azimova	13 May 2017	Islamic Solidarity Games	Baku, Azerbaijan	
Total	176 kg	Sabina Azimova	13 May 2017	Islamic Solidarity Games	Baku, Azerbaijan	
58 kg
Snatch	112 kg	Boyanka Kostova	23 November 2015	World Championships	Houston, United States	
Clean & Jerk	140 kg	Boyanka Kostova	23 November 2015	World Championships	Houston, United States	
Total	252 kg	Boyanka Kostova	23 November 2015	World Championships	Houston, United States	
63 kg
Snatch						
Clean and jerk						
Total						
69 kg
Snatch						
Clean and jerk						
Total						
75 kg
Snatch						
Clean and jerk						
Total						
+75 kg
Snatch						
Clean and jerk						
Total						
