= List of African records in Olympic weightlifting =

The following are the African records in Olympic weightlifting. Records are maintained in each weight class for the snatch lift, clean and jerk lift, and the total for both lifts by the Weightlifting Federation of Africa (WFA).

== Current records ==
Key to tables: Awaiting ratification Not ratified or later rescinded by WFA

=== Men ===
Event	Record	Athlete	Nation	Date	Meet	Place	Ref
60 kg
Snatch	129 kg	Standard					
Clean & Jerk	154 kg	El-Sayed Aly Attia	Egypt	3 October 2025	World Championships	Førde, Norway	
Total	278 kg	El-Sayed Aly Attia	Egypt	3 October 2025	World Championships	Førde, Norway	
65 kg
Snatch	136 kg	Standard					
Clean & Jerk	164 kg	Noureldin Zaky	Egypt	9 November 2025	Islamic Solidarity Games	Riyadh, Saudi Arabia	
Total	298 kg	Noureldin Zaky	Egypt	9 November 2025	Islamic Solidarity Games	Riyadh, Saudi Arabia	
71 kg
Snatch	151 kg	Edidiong Umoafia	Nigeria	9 November 2025	Islamic Solidarity Games	Riyadh, Saudi Arabia	
Clean & Jerk	175 kg	Edidiong Umoafia	Nigeria	9 November 2025	Islamic Solidarity Games	Riyadh, Saudi Arabia	
Clean & Jerk	180 kg	Ahmed Said	Egypt	14 May 2026	African Championships	Ismailia, Egypt	
Total	326 kg	Edidiong Umoafia	Nigeria	9 November 2025	Islamic Solidarity Games	Riyadh, Saudi Arabia	
79 kg
Snatch	166 kg	Abdelrahman Younes	Egypt	10 November 2025	Islamic Solidarity Games	Riyadh, Saudi Arabia	
Clean & Jerk	198 kg	Abdelrahman Younes	Egypt	6 October 2025	World Championships	Førde, Norway	
Total	362 kg	Abdelrahman Younes	Egypt	10 November 2025	Islamic Solidarity Games	Riyadh, Saudi Arabia	
88 kg
Snatch	168 kg	Standard					
Snatch	182 kg	Abdelrahman Younes	Egypt	15 May 2026	African Championships	Ismailia, Egypt	
Clean & Jerk	198 kg	Standard					
Clean & Jerk	210 kg	Abdelrahman Younes	Egypt	15 May 2026	African Championships	Ismailia, Egypt	
Total	361 kg	Standard					
Total	392 kg	Abdelrahman Younes	Egypt	15 May 2026	African Championships	Ismailia, Egypt	
94 kg
Snatch	169 kg	Standard					
Snatch	170 kg	Karim Abokahla	Egypt	15 May 2026	African Championships	Ismailia, Egypt	
Clean & Jerk	206 kg	Karim Abokahla	Egypt	11 November 2025	Islamic Solidarity Games	Riyadh, Saudi Arabia	
Clean & Jerk	210 kg	Karim Abokahla	Egypt	15 May 2026	African Championships	Ismailia, Egypt	
Total	375 kg	Standard					
Total	380 kg	Karim Abokahla	Egypt	15 May 2026	African Championships	Ismailia, Egypt	
110 kg
Snatch	181 kg	Standard					
Clean & Jerk	221 kg	Standard					
Total	402 kg	Standard					
+110 kg
Snatch	194 kg	Standard					
Clean & Jerk	234 kg	Standard					
Total	419 kg	Standard					

=== Women ===
Event	Record	Athlete	Nation	Date	Meet	Place	Ref
48 kg
Snatch	81 kg	Standard					
Clean & Jerk	99 kg	Standard					
Total	179 kg	Standard					
53 kg
Snatch	90 kg	Onome Didih	Nigeria	26 August 2025	Commonwealth Championships	Ahmedabad, India	
Snatch	93 kg	Onome Didih	Nigeria	27 July 2026	Commonwealth Games	Glasgow, United Kingdom	
Clean & Jerk	108 kg	Standard					
Clean & Jerk	113 kg	Onome Didih	Nigeria	27 July 2026	Commonwealth Games	Glasgow, United Kingdom	
Total	197 kg	Onome Didih	Nigeria	26 August 2025	Commonwealth Championships	Ahmedabad, India	
Total	206 kg	Onome Didih	Nigeria	27 July 2026	Commonwealth Games	Glasgow, United Kingdom	
58 kg
Snatch	101 kg	Rafiatu Lawal	Nigeria	4 October 2025	World Championships	Førde, Norway	
Snatch	103 kg	Rafiatu Lawal	Nigeria	27 July 2026	Commonwealth Games	Glasgow, United Kingdom	
Clean & Jerk	128 kg	Rafiatu Lawal	Nigeria	4 October 2025	World Championships	Førde, Norway	
Total	229 kg	Rafiatu Lawal	Nigeria	4 October 2025	World Championships	Førde, Norway	
63 kg
Snatch	99 kg	Standard					
Clean & Jerk	124 kg	Standard					
Total	222 kg	Standard					
69 kg
Snatch	110 kg	Islamiyat Yusuf	Nigeria	10 November 2025	Islamic Solidarity Games	Riyadh, Saudi Arabia	
Clean & Jerk	132 kg	Standard					
Total	236 kg	Standard					
77 kg
Snatch	116 kg	Sarah Matthew	Nigeria	11 November 2025	Islamic Solidarity Games	Riyadh, Saudi Arabia	
Clean & Jerk	145 kg	Sara Ahmed	Egypt	11 November 2025	Islamic Solidarity Games	Riyadh, Saudi Arabia	
Total	260 kg	Sara Ahmed	Egypt	11 November 2025	Islamic Solidarity Games	Riyadh, Saudi Arabia	
86 kg
Snatch	118 kg	Standard					
Clean & Jerk	150 kg	Standard					
Clean & Jerk	151 kg	Sara Ahmed	Egypt	15 May 2026	African Championships	Ismailia, Egypt	
Total	266 kg	Standard					
+86 kg
Snatch	121 kg	Standard					
Clean & Jerk	149 kg	Standard					
Total	265 kg	Standard					

== Historical records ==
=== Men (2018–2025) ===
Event	Record	Athlete	Nation	Date	Meet	Place	Ref
55 kg
Snatch	125 kg	Standard					
Clean & Jerk	144 kg	Standard					
Total	262 kg	Standard					
61 kg
Snatch	132 kg	Standard					
Clean & Jerk	155 kg	Standard					
Total	283 kg	Standard					
67 kg
Snatch	140 kg	Standard					
Clean & Jerk	168 kg	Ahmed Saad	Egypt	26 April 2019	African Championships	Cairo, Egypt	
Total	303 kg	Tojonirina Andriatsitohaina	Madagascar	27 May 2021	African Championships	Nairobi, Kenya	
73 kg
Snatch	153 kg	Karem Ben Hnia	Tunisia	27 August 2019	African Games	Rabat, Morocco	
Clean & Jerk	186 kg	Karem Ben Hnia	Tunisia	4 November 2018	World Championships	Ashgabat, Turkmenistan	
Total	338 kg	Karem Ben Hnia	Tunisia	26 April 2019	African Championships	Cairo, Egypt	
81 kg
Snatch	173 kg	Mohamed Ihab	Egypt	5 November 2018	World Championships	Ashgabat, Turkmenistan	
Clean & Jerk	200 kg	Mohamed Ihab	Egypt	5 November 2018	World Championships	Ashgabat, Turkmenistan	
Total	373 kg	Mohamed Ihab	Egypt	5 November 2018	World Championships	Ashgabat, Turkmenistan	
89 kg
Snatch	171 kg	Karim Abokahla	Egypt	3 July 2022	Mediterranean Games	Oran, Algeria	
Clean & Jerk	212 kg	Karim Abokahla	Egypt	3 July 2022	Mediterranean Games	Oran, Algeria	
Total	383 kg	Karim Abokahla	Egypt	3 July 2022	Mediterranean Games	Oran, Algeria	
96 kg
Snatch	174 kg	Karim Abokahla	Egypt	13 September 2023	World Championships	Riyadh, Saudi Arabia	
Clean & Jerk	213 kg	Karim Abokahla	Egypt	13 September 2023	World Championships	Riyadh, Saudi Arabia	
Total	387 kg	Karim Abokahla	Egypt	13 September 2023	World Championships	Riyadh, Saudi Arabia	
102 kg
Snatch	183 kg	Aymen Bacha	Tunisia	13 December 2024	World Championships	Manama, Bahrain	
Clean & Jerk	213 kg	Standard					
Total	395 kg	Aymen Bacha	Tunisia	13 December 2024	World Championships	Manama, Bahrain	
109 kg
Snatch	177 kg	Standard					
Clean & Jerk	219 kg	Standard					
Total	398 kg	Standard					
+109 kg
Snatch	203 kg	Walid Bidani	Algeria	9 February 2024	African Championships	Ismailia, Egypt	
Clean & Jerk	243 kg	Abdelrahman El-Sayed	Egypt	18 May 2023	African Championships	Tunis, Tunisia	
Total	437 kg	Walid Bidani	Algeria	4 July 2022	Mediterranean Games	Oran, Algeria	

=== Men (1998–2018) ===
Event	Record	Athlete	Nation	Date	Meet	Place	Ref
56 kg
Snatch	132 kg	Khalil El-Maaoui	Tunisia	29 July 2012	Olympic Games	London, United Kingdom	
Clean & Jerk	146 kg	Khalil El-Maaoui	Tunisia	20 November 2009	World Championships	Goyang, South Korea	
Total	271 kg	Khalil El-Maaoui	Tunisia	20 November 2009	World Championships	Goyang, South Korea	
62 kg
Snatch	137,5 kg	Atef Jarray	Tunisia	8 September 2001	Mediterranean Games	Tunis, Tunisia	
Clean & Jerk	162 kg	Ahmed Saad	Egypt	30 July 2012	Olympic Games	London, United Kingdom	
Total	295 kg	Atef Jarray	Tunisia	8 September 2001	Mediterranean Games	Tunis, Tunisia	
69 kg
Snatch	152,5 kg	Youssef Sbai	Tunisia	21 November 2002	World Championships	Warsaw, Poland	
Clean & Jerk	187,5 kg	Mohamed El-Tantawy	Egypt	21 November 2002	World Championships	Warsaw, Poland	
Total	335 kg	Youssef Sbai	Tunisia	21 November 2002	World Championships	Warsaw, Poland	
77 kg
Snatch	165 kg	Mohamed Ihab	Egypt	10 August 2016	Olympic Games	Rio de Janeiro, Brasil	
Clean & Jerk	201 kg	Mohamed Ihab	Egypt	24 November 2015	World Championships	Houston, United States	
Total	363 kg	Mohamed Ihab	Egypt	24 November 2015	World Championships	Houston, United States	
85 kg
Snatch	165 kg	Samir Ghachem	Tunisia	25 November 1999	World Championships	Piraeus, Greece	
Clean & Jerk	210 kg	Tarek Yehia Abdelazim	Egypt	3 August 2012	Olympic Games	London, United Kingdom	
Total	375 kg	Tarek Yehia Abdelazim	Egypt	3 August 2012	Olympic Games	London, United Kingdom	
94 kg
Snatch	174 kg	Ragab Abdelhay	Egypt	13 August 2016	Olympic Games	Rio de Janeiro, Brasil	
Clean & Jerk	213 kg	Ragab Abdelhay	Egypt	13 August 2016	Olympic Games	Rio de Janeiro, Brasil	
Total	387 kg	Ragab Abdelhay	Egypt	13 August 2016	Olympic Games	Rio de Janeiro, Brasil	
105 kg
Snatch	182 kg	Ibrahim Moursi	Egypt	16 November 2005	World Championships	Doha, Qatar	
Clean & Jerk	218 kg	Ibrahim Moursi	Egypt	16 November 2005	World Championships	Doha, Qatar	
Total	400 kg	Ibrahim Moursi	Egypt	16 November 2005	World Championships	Doha, Qatar	
+105 kg
Snatch	200 kg	Mohamed Masoud	Egypt	11 September 2015	African Games	Brazzaville, Congo Republic	
Clean & Jerk	243 kg	Mohamed Masoud	Egypt	16 November 2014	World Championships	Almaty, Kazakhstan	
Total	441 kg	Mohamed Masoud	Egypt	11 September 2015	African Games	Brazzaville, Congo Republic	

=== Women (2018–2025) ===
Event	Record	Athlete	Nation	Date	Meet	Place	Ref
45 kg
Snatch	77 kg	Rosina Randafiarison	Madagascar	4 September 2023	World Championships	Riyadh, Saudi Arabia	
Clean & Jerk	93 kg	Rosina Randafiarison	Madagascar	4 September 2023	World Championships	Riyadh, Saudi Arabia	
Total	170 kg	Rosina Randafiarison	Madagascar	4 September 2023	World Championships	Riyadh, Saudi Arabia	
49 kg
Snatch	80 kg	Rosina Randafiarison	Madagascar	7 August 2024	Olympic Games	Paris, France	
Clean & Jerk	100 kg	Rosina Randafiarison	Madagascar	7 August 2024	Olympic Games	Paris, France	
Total	180 kg	Rosina Randafiarison	Madagascar	7 August 2024	Olympic Games	Paris, France	
55 kg
Snatch	97 kg	Nouha Landoulsi	Tunisia	3 November 2018	World Championships	Ashgabat, Turkmenistan	
Clean & Jerk	116 kg	Adijat Olarinoye	Nigeria	26 August 2019	African Games	Rabat, Morocco	
Total	211 kg	Nouha Landoulsi	Tunisia	3 November 2018	World Championships	Ashgabat, Turkmenistan	
59 kg
Snatch	101 kg	Rafiatu Lawal	Nigeria	3 April 2024	World Cup	Phuket, Thailand	
Clean & Jerk	130 kg	Rafiatu Lawal	Nigeria	8 August 2024	Olympic Games	Paris, France	
Total	230 kg	Rafiatu Lawal	Nigeria	8 August 2024	Olympic Games	Paris, France	
64 kg
Snatch	104 kg	Neama Said	Egypt	12 December 2021	World Championships	Tashkent, Uzbekistan	
Clean & Jerk	127 kg	Neama Said	Egypt	12 December 2021	World Championships	Tashkent, Uzbekistan	
Total	233 kg	Neama Said	Egypt	12 December 2021	World Championships	Tashkent, Uzbekistan	
71 kg
Snatch	111 kg	Sara Ahmed	Egypt	6 November 2018	World Championships	Ashgabat, Turkmenistan	
Clean & Jerk	141 kg	Sara Ahmed	Egypt	6 November 2018	World Championships	Ashgabat, Turkmenistan	
Total	252 kg	Sara Ahmed	Egypt	6 November 2018	World Championships	Ashgabat, Turkmenistan	
76 kg
Snatch	113 kg	Sara Ahmed	Egypt	13 December 2022	World Championships	Bogotá, Colombia	
Clean & Jerk	148 kg	Sara Ahmed	Egypt	13 December 2022	World Championships	Bogotá, Colombia	
Total	261 kg	Sara Ahmed	Egypt	13 December 2022	World Championships	Bogotá, Colombia	
81 kg
Snatch	117 kg	Sara Ahmed	Egypt	17 May 2023	African Championships	Tunis, Tunisia	
Clean & Jerk	151 kg	Sara Ahmed	Egypt	17 May 2023	African Championships	Tunis, Tunisia	
Total	268 kg	Sara Ahmed	Egypt	17 May 2023	African Championships	Tunis, Tunisia	
87 kg
Snatch	118 kg	Standard					
Clean & Jerk	146 kg	Standard					
Total	261 kg	Standard					
+87 kg
Snatch	124 kg	Halima Abdelazim	Egypt	31 October 2022	African Championships	Cairo, Egypt	
Clean & Jerk	153 kg	Halima Abdelazim	Egypt	15 December 2022	World Championships	Bogotá, Colombia	
Total	275 kg	Halima Abdelazim	Egypt	15 December 2022	World Championships	Bogotá, Colombia	

=== Women (1998–2018) ===
Event	Record	Athlete	Nation	Date	Meet	Place	Ref
48 kg
Snatch	80 kg	Roilya Ranaivosoa	Mauritius	21 November 2015	World Championships	Houston, United States	
Clean & Jerk	105 kg	Blessed Udoh	Nigeria	14 August 2004	Olympic Games	Athens, Greece	
Total	180 kg	Blessed Udoh	Nigeria	14 August 2004	Olympic Games	Athens, Greece	
53 kg
Snatch	88 kg	Nouha Landoulsi	Tunisia	13 July 2017	African Championships	Vacoas-Phoenix, Mauritius	
Clean & Jerk	115 kg	Chinenye Fidelis	Nigeria	6 November 2011	World Championships	Paris, France	
Total	202 kg	Chinenye Fidelis	Nigeria	31 March 2012	African Championships	Nairobi, Kenya	
58 kg
Snatch	95 kg	Franca Gbodo	Nigeria	16 August 2004	Olympic Games	Athens, Greece	
Clean & Jerk	122 kg	Chinenye Fidelis	Nigeria	10 May 2016	African Championships	Yaoundé, Cameroon	
Total	212 kg	Franca Gbodo	Nigeria	16 August 2004	Olympic Games	Athens, Greece	
63 kg
Snatch	104 kg	Sara Ahmed	Egypt	12 November 2014	World Championships	Almaty, Kazakhstan	
Clean & Jerk	127 kg	Leila Lassouani	Algeria	3 May 2004	African Championships	Tunis, Tunisia	
Total	229 kg	Sara Ahmed	Egypt	12 November 2014	World Championships	Almaty, Kazakhstan	
69 kg
Snatch	112 kg	Sara Ahmed	Egypt	10 August 2016	Olympic Games	Rio de Janeiro, Brazil	
Clean & Jerk	143 kg	Sara Ahmed	Egypt	10 August 2016	Olympic Games	Rio de Janeiro, Brazil	
Total	255 kg	Sara Ahmed	Egypt	10 August 2016	Olympic Games	Rio de Janeiro, Brazil	
75 kg
Snatch	120 kg	Nahla Ramadan	Egypt	20 August 2004	Olympic Games	Athens, Greece	
Clean & Jerk	147 kg	Nahla Ramadan	Egypt	17 June 2003	World Junior Championships	Hermosillo, Mexico	
Total	262 kg	Nahla Ramadan	Egypt	17 June 2003	World Junior Championships	Hermosillo, Mexico	
90 kg
Snatch	112 kg	Bilkisu Musa	Nigeria	27 November 1999	World Championships	Piraeus, Greece	
Clean & Jerk	145 kg	Abeer Abdelrahman	Egypt	11 June 2010	World Junior Championships	Sofia, Bulgaria	
Total	255 kg	Abeer Abdelrahman	Egypt	11 June 2010	World Junior Championships	Sofia, Bulgaria	
+90 kg
Snatch	129 kg	Mariam Usman	Nigeria	5 August 2012	Olympic Games	London, United Kingdom	
Clean & Jerk	161 kg	Shaimaa Ahmed Khalaf	Egypt	14 August 2016	Olympic Games	Rio de Janeiro, Brazil	
Total	281 kg	Mariam Usman	Nigeria	29 March 2012	African Championships	Nairobi, Kenya	
