= List of Qatari records in Olympic weightlifting =

The following are the records of Qatar in Olympic weightlifting. Records are maintained in each weight class for the snatch lift, clean and jerk lift, and the total for both lifts by the Qatar Weightlifting and Bodybuilding Federation.

== Current records ==
=== Men ===
Event	Record	Athlete	Date	Meet	Place	Ref
60 kg
Snatch						
Clean & Jerk						
Total						
65 kg
Snatch						
Clean & Jerk						
Total						
71 kg
Snatch						
Clean & Jerk						
Total						
79 kg
Snatch						
Clean & Jerk						
Total						
88 kg
Snatch						
Clean & Jerk						
Total						
95 kg
Snatch	150 kg	Fares El-Bakh	28 September 2026	Asian Games	Nagoya, Japan	
Clean & Jerk	190 kg	Fares El-Bakh	28 September 2026	Asian Games	Nagoya, Japan	
Total	340 kg	Fares El-Bakh	28 September 2026	Asian Games	Nagoya, Japan	
110 kg
Snatch						
Clean & Jerk						
Total						
+110 kg
Snatch						
Clean & Jerk						
Total						

=== Women ===
Event	Record	Athlete	Date	Meet	Place	Ref
48 kg
Snatch						
Clean & Jerk						
Total						
53 kg
Snatch						
Clean & Jerk						
Total						
58 kg
Snatch						
Clean & Jerk						
Total						
63 kg
Snatch						
Clean & Jerk						
Total						
69 kg
Snatch						
Clean & Jerk						
Total						
77 kg
Snatch						
Clean & Jerk						
Total						
86 kg
Snatch						
Clean & Jerk						
Total						
+86 kg
Snatch	117 kg	Ouisal Ikhlef	12 November 2025	Islamic Solidarity Games	Riyadh, Saudi Arabia	
Clean & Jerk	160 kg	Ouisal Ikhlef	12 November 2025	Islamic Solidarity Games	Riyadh, Saudi Arabia	
Total	277 kg	Ouisal Ikhlef	12 November 2025	Islamic Solidarity Games	Riyadh, Saudi Arabia	

== Historical records ==
=== Men (2018–2025) ===
Event	Record	Athlete	Date	Meet	Place	Ref
55 kg
Snatch						
Clean and Jerk						
Total						
61 kg
Snatch						
Clean & Jerk						
Total						
67 kg
Snatch						
Clean & Jerk						
Total						
73 kg
Snatch						
Clean and Jerk						
Total						
81 kg
Snatch						
Clean and Jerk						
Total						
89 kg
Snatch	123 kg	Nader Bakr	29 March 2023	Youth World Championships	Durrës, Albania	
Clean and Jerk	148 kg	Nader Bakr	29 March 2023	Youth World Championships	Durrës, Albania	
Total	271 kg	Nader Bakr	29 March 2023	Youth World Championships	Durrës, Albania	
96 kg
Snatch	178 kg	Fares El-Bakh	24 September 2019	World Championships	Pattaya, Thailand	
Clean and Jerk	228 kg	Fares El-Bakh	22 December 2019	Qatar Cup	Doha, Qatar	
Total	404 kg	Fares El-Bakh	22 December 2019	Qatar Cup	Doha, Qatar	
102 kg
Snatch	174 kg	Fares El-Bakh	24 April 2021	Asian Championships	Tashkent, Uzbekistan	
Clean and Jerk	222 kg	Fares El-Bakh	24 April 2021	Asian Championships	Tashkent, Uzbekistan	
Total	396 kg	Fares El-Bakh	24 April 2021	Asian Championships	Tashkent, Uzbekistan	
109 kg
Snatch						
Clean and Jerk						
Total						
+109 kg
Snatch						
Clean and Jerk						
Total						

=== Women (2018–2025) ===
Event	Record	Athlete	Date	Meet	Place	Ref
45 kg
Snatch						
Clean and Jerk						
Total						
49 kg
Snatch						
Clean and Jerk						
Total						
55 kg
Snatch						
Clean and Jerk						
Total						
59 kg
Snatch	80 kg	Rebeka Ibrahima	2 January 2023	Qatar Cup	Doha, Qatar	
Clean & Jerk	95 kg	Rebeka Ibrahima	2 January 2023	Qatar Cup	Doha, Qatar	
Total	175 kg	Rebeka Ibrahima	2 January 2023	Qatar Cup	Doha, Qatar	
64 kg
Snatch						
Clean and Jerk						
Total						
71 kg
Snatch						
Clean and Jerk						
Total						
76 kg
Snatch						
Clean and Jerk						
Total						
81 kg
Snatch						
Clean and Jerk						
Total						
87 kg
Snatch						
Clean and Jerk						
Total						
+87 kg
Snatch						
Clean and Jerk						
Total						
