= 2025 World Weightlifting Championships – Women's 58 kg =

Women's 58 kg at the 2025 World Weightlifting Championships
- Venue: Førdehuset
- Location: Førde, Norway
- Dates: 3 and 4 October
- Winning total: 236 kg CWR

Medalists
gold medal	Kim Il-gyong	North Korea
silver medal	Rafiatu Lawal	Nigeria
bronze medal	Kuo Hsing-chun	Chinese Taipei

The women's 58 kilograms competition at the 2025 World Weightlifting Championships was held on 3 and 4 October 2025.

== Schedule ==
Date	Time	Event
3 October 2025	10:00	Group C
4 October 2025	14:30	Group B
4 October 2025	19:30	Group A

== Records ==
Prior to this competition, the existing world records were as follows.

World record	Snatch	World Standard	105 kg	—	1 June 2025
World record	Clean & Jerk	World Standard	132 kg	—	1 June 2025
World record	Total	World Standard	235 kg	—	1 June 2025

== Results ==
Rank	Athlete	Group	Snatch (kg)				Clean & Jerk (kg)				Total
Rank	Athlete	Group	1	2	3	Rank	1	2	3	Rank	Total
1st place, gold medalist(s)	Kim Il-gyong (PRK)	A	100	102	104	1st place, gold medalist(s)	128	132	~~134~~	1st place, gold medalist(s)	236 CWR
2nd place, silver medalist(s)	Rafiatu Lawal (NGR)	A	99	101; AF	~~104~~	2nd place, silver medalist(s)	126	128; AF	~~133~~	2nd place, silver medalist(s)	229; AF
3rd place, bronze medalist(s)	Kuo Hsing-chun (TPE)	A	94	96	~~98~~	5	~~124~~	125	128	3rd place, bronze medalist(s)	224
4	Long Tanzhen (CHN)	A	~~93~~	93	96	6	121	124	~~127~~	5	220; AJR
5	Miranda Ulrey (USA)	A	96	98	~~100~~	3rd place, bronze medalist(s)	117	~~121~~	~~122~~	9	215
6	Natasya Beteyob (INA)	A	~~93~~	93	~~97~~	10	117	121	~~125~~	6	214
7	Garance Rigaud (FRA)	A	~~92~~	~~92~~	93	11	~~113~~	115	118	7	211
8	Olha Ivzhenko (UKR)	A	93	~~95~~	~~96~~	9	110	114	116	11	209
9	Tang Yuxuan (CHN)	A	86	89	91	12	117	~~121~~	~~121~~	8	208
10	Kiana Elliott (AUS)	B	95	~~98~~	~~100~~	7	105	110	112	16	207
11	María Olalla (ESP)	C	84	87	90	13	110	113	116	10	206
12	Ham Eun-ji (KOR)	B	86	~~90~~	~~90~~	15	115	~~119~~	~~119~~	12	201
13	Ine Andersson (NOR)	B	83	~~85~~	86	17	110	~~114~~	114	14	200
14	Alba Sánchez (ESP)	B	~~85~~	85	89	14	110	~~113~~	~~113~~	18	199
15	Bindyarani Devi (IND)	B	85	~~88~~	~~89~~	19	108	112	~~116~~	15	197
16	Júlia Rodrigues (BRA)	C	85	~~88~~	~~91~~	18	~~108~~	~~110~~	110	17	195
17	Irene Borrego (MEX)	B	83	86	~~89~~	16	105	~~110~~	~~110~~	20	191
18	Josée Gallant (CAN)	B	~~85~~	~~85~~	85	20	~~104~~	104	~~107~~	21	189
19	Rose Harvey (CAN)	C	80	~~83~~	83	22	~~105~~	105	~~109~~	19	188
20	Marlous Schuilwerve (NED)	C	~~84~~	84	~~87~~	21	100	~~103~~	~~104~~	22	184
21	Dimitra Ioannou (CYP)	C	70	75	78	23	87	92	~~96~~	23	170
22	Danah Boghaith (KUW)	C	48	~~52~~	52	24	56	60	~~65~~	24	112
23	Anwar Al-Kandari (KUW)	C	40	45	50	25	50	55	60	25	110
—	Suratwadee Yodsarn (THA)	A	~~95~~	~~95~~	~~95~~	—	125	127	~~129~~	4	—
—	Noemi Filippazzo (ITA)	B	92	96	~~100~~	4	~~107~~	~~107~~	~~108~~	—	—
—	Nina Sterckx (BEL)	B	92	~~95~~	95	8	~~110~~	~~110~~	~~110~~	—	—
—	Luz Casadevall (ARG)	B	~~93~~	~~93~~	~~93~~	—	114	~~118~~	~~120~~	13	—
—	Ghofrane Belkhir (TUN)	A	Did not start								
—	Maha Fajreslam (MAR)	C	Did not start								
X	Eliza Pratt (CWF)	C	78	81	~~83~~	X	98	~~101~~	~~103~~	X	179
X	Jessica Gordon Brown (CWF)	C	73	75	77	X	92	—	—	X	169
