= Weightlifting at the 2022 Commonwealth Games – Women's 59 kg =

Weightlifting – Women's 59 kg at the 2022 Commonwealth Games
- Venue: National Exhibition Centre
- Dates: 31 July
- Competitors: 11 from 11 nations
- Winning total: 206 kg

Medalists
gold medal	Rafiatu Folashade Lawal	Nigeria
silver medal	Jessica Gordon Brown	England
bronze medal	Tali Darsigny	Canada

The Women's 59 kg weightlifting event at the 2022 Commonwealth Games took place at the National Exhibition Centre on 31 July 2022. The weightlifter from Nigeria won the gold, with a combined lift of 206 kg.

== Records ==
Prior to this competition, the existing world, Commonwealth and Games records were as follows:
When the previous records and weight classes were discarded following readjustment, the IWF defined "world standards" as the minimum lifts needed to qualify as world records (WR), CommonWealth Authority defined "Commonwealth standards" and "Commonwealth games standards" as the minimum lifts needed to qualify as Commonwealth record (CR) and Commonwealth games record (GR) in the new weight classes. Wherever World Standard/Commonwealth Standard/Commonwealth Games Standard appear in the list below, no qualified weightlifter has yet lifted the benchmark weights in a sanctioned competition.

World record	Snatch	Kuo Hsing-chun (TPE)	110 kg	Tashkent, Uzbekistan	20 Apr 2021
World record	Clean & Jerk	Kuo Hsing-chun (TPE)	140 kg	Pattaya, Thailand	18 September 2019
World record	Total	Kuo Hsing-chun (TPE)	247 kg	Tashkent, Uzbekistan	20 Apr 2021
Commonwealth record	Snatch	Tali Darsigny (CAN)	94 kg	Lima, Peru	28 July 2019
Commonwealth record	Clean & Jerk	Chinenye Fidelis (NGR)	125 kg	Ashgabat, Turkmenistan	3 November 2018
Commonwealth record	Total	Zoe Smith (ENG)	216 kg	Pattaya, Thailand	18 September 2019
Games record	Snatch	Commonwealth Games Standard	87 kg		
Games record	Clean & Jerk	Commonwealth Games Standard	111 kg		
Games record	Total	Commonwealth Games Standard	197 kg		

The following records were established during the competition:

Snatch	90 kg	Rafiatu Folashade Lawal (NGR)	GR
Clean & Jerk	116 kg	Rafiatu Folashade Lawal (NGR)	GR
Total	206 kg	Rafiatu Folashade Lawal (NGR)	GR

== Schedule ==
All times are British Summer Time (UTC+1)

Date	Time	Round
Sunday 31 July 2022	14:00	Final

== Results ==
Rank	Athlete	Body weight (kg)	Snatch (kg)				Clean & Jerk (kg)				Total
Rank	Athlete	Body weight (kg)	1	2	3	Result	1	2	3	Result	Total
1st place, gold medalist(s)	Rafiatu Folashade Lawal (NGR)	57.64	90	~~94~~	~~95~~	90 GR	110	115	116	116 GR	206 GR
2nd place, silver medalist(s)	Jessica Gordon Brown (ENG)	58.75	86	~~89~~	~~89~~	86	107	109	111	111	197
3rd place, bronze medalist(s)	Tali Darsigny (CAN)	58.95	85	~~87~~	87	87	105	107	109	109	196
4	Anneke Spies (RSA)	58.89	80	~~85~~	85	85	100	~~101~~	105	105	190
5	Brenna Kean (AUS)	58.67	79	~~83~~	83	83	106	~~111~~	~~114~~	106	189
6	Hannah Crymble (NIR)	58.24	~~83~~	83	~~85~~	83	~~102~~	~~102~~	103	103	186
7	Popy Hazarika (IND)	57.05	81	~~84~~	~~86~~	81	~~102~~	102	~~107~~	102	183
8	Tenishia Thornton (MLT)	56.33	~~78~~	78	~~80~~	78	100	~~103~~	~~103~~	100	178
9	Marlyne Marcus Marceeta (MAS)	56.94	73	~~78~~	~~78~~	73	102	~~108~~	~~108~~	102	175
10	Sarah Ang (SGP)	57.99	73	~~78~~	~~78~~	73	85	90	~~95~~	90	163
―	Clementina Ciana Agricole (SEY)	58.94	~~78~~	~~79~~	~~79~~	—	—	—	—	―	DNF
