= Malaysia at the 2025 Islamic Solidarity Games =

- IOC code: MAS
- NOC: Olympic Council of Malaysia

in Riyadh, Saudi Arabia
- Competitors: 17 in 5 sports
- Medals Ranked 0th: Gold 0 Silver 0 Bronze 3 Total 3

Islamic Solidarity Games appearances (overview)
- 2005; 2013; 2017; 2021; 2025

Malaysia competed at the 2025 Islamic Solidarity Games, which were held from 7 to 21 November 2025 in Riyadh, Saudi Arabia.

== Medalists ==
Medals by sport
Sport	1st place, gold medalist(s)	2nd place, silver medalist(s)	3rd place, bronze medalist(s)	Total
Muaythai	0	0	3	1
Total	0	0	3	3

Medal	Name	Sport	Event	Date
Bronze	Wassof Rumijam	Muaythai	Men's 55-60 kg	13 November
Bronze	Damia Husna Azian	Muaythai	Women's 45-50 kg	13 November
Bronze	Nur Amisha Azrilrizal	Muaythai	Women's 50-55 kg	13 November

== Competitors ==
Sport	Men	Women	Total
Athletics	2	0	2
Karate	3	2	5
Muaythai	4	2	6
Taekwondo	1	0	1
Weightlifting	1	2	3
Total	11	6	17

== Athletics ==
Athlete	Event	Heats		Final	
Athlete	Event	Time	Rank	Time	Rank
Hazriq Cik Mat Klau	Men's 110 m hurdles	14.28	7 q	14.65	7
Shawn Roshan Singh	Men's 1500 m	4:05.91	12	Did not advance	

== Karate ==
Athlete	Event	Round of 32	Round of 16	Quarterfinals	Semifinals	Final / BM	
Athlete	Event	Opponent Result	Opponent Result	Opponent Result	Opponent Result	Opponent Result	Rank
Danesh Asyrraf Nazri	Men's 60 kg	Meskini (IRI); L 1-9	Did not advance				
Bagawathi Muniyandy	Men's 75 kg	Bye	Bulut (TUR); L 0-8	Did not advance			
Kamarul Sabaruddin	Men's 84 kg	Bye	Messaoudi (UAE); L 0-4	Did not advance			
Jayashree Pathiyanathan	Women's 61 kg	Bye	Humayra (BAN); W 4-4	Malak (KSA); L 0-1	Did not advance		
Mirza Athirah Faizal	Women's 68 kg	Bye	Rzazade (CMR); L 2-5	Did not advance			

== Muaythai ==
Athlete	Event	Round of 16	Quarterfinals	Semifinals	Final	
Athlete	Event	Opponent Result	Opponent Result	Opponent Result	Opponent Result	Rank
Wassof Rumijam	Men's 60 kg	Ali (BHR); W 10-9	Abdo Rageh (YEM); W 30-27	Al-Badr (IRQ); L WO	Did not advance	3rd place, bronze medalist(s)
Ahmad Rakib	Men's 65 kg	Hasan (IRQ); L WO	Did not advance			
Mohamad Rosli	Men's 70 kg	Kandil (EGY); L WO	Did not advance			
Ammarul Ubaidillah	Men's 75 kg	Ardiansyah (INA); L WO	Did not advance			
Damia Azian	Women's 50 kg	Bye	Ouhachi (ALG); W 29-28	Akhlouf (MAR); L WO	Did not advance	3rd place, bronze medalist(s)
Nur Azrilrizal	Women's 55 kg	Elsayed (EGY); W WO	Al-Nadaf (SYR); W WO	Turan (TUR); L 26-30	Did not advance	3rd place, bronze medalist(s)

== Taekwondo ==
Athlete	Event	Round of 16	Quarterfinals	Semifinals	Final / BM	
Athlete	Event	Opponent Result	Opponent Result	Opponent Result	Opponent Result	Rank
Zulhafiz Zulhadi	Men's +82 kg	K. Ateşli (TUR); L 0–2	Did not advance			

== Weightlifting ==
Athlete	Event	Snatch		Clean & Jerk		Total	Rank
Athlete	Event	Result	Rank	Result	Rank	Total	Rank
Amin Hakimi Shukry	Men's 71 kg	~~120~~	DNF	~~152~~	DNF	—	—
Alia Adani Johari	Women's 58 kg	70	7	~~88~~	DNF	—	—
Syasya Khairina Samsur	Women's 63 kg	DNS					
