= Muaythai at the 2025 Islamic Solidarity Games =

- Venue: The Promenade Art Tower
- Dates: 11—14 November 2025
- Competitors: TBA from TBA nations

The muaythai tournament at the 2025 Islamic Solidarity Games in Riyadh was held between 11—14 November 2025. The muaythai competition took place at The Promenade Art Tower in Saudi Arabia.

== Medal table ==
* Host nation (Saudi Arabia)

Rank	Nation	Gold	Silver	Bronze	Total
1	Turkey	3	1	1	5
2	Morocco	2	0	1	3
3	United Arab Emirates	1	1	1	3
4	Iraq	1	1	0	2
5	Afghanistan	1	0	0	1
5	Kazakhstan	1	0	0	1
7	Iran	0	4	0	4
8	Azerbaijan	0	1	2	3
8	Saudi Arabia*	0	1	2	3
10	Malaysia	0	0	3	3
11	Uzbekistan	0	0	2	2
12	Algeria	0	0	1	1
12	Jordan	0	0	1	1
12	Lebanon	0	0	1	1
12	Palestine	0	0	1	1
Totals (15 entries)		9	9	16	34

== Medal overview ==
=== Men ===
Event	Gold	Silver	Bronze
60 kg	Turar Duisekhan; Kazakhstan	Ayad Al-Badr; Iraq	Wassof Bin Ruminam; Malaysia
60 kg	Turar Duisekhan; Kazakhstan	Ayad Al-Badr; Iraq	Ali Aliyev; Azerbaijan
65 kg	Hamza Rachid; Morocco	Xayal Aliyev; Azerbaijan	Ameer Amle; Palestine
65 kg	Hamza Rachid; Morocco	Xayal Aliyev; Azerbaijan	Sercan Koç; Turkey
70 kg	Mohamad Mardi; United Arab Emirates	Amer Al-Anazi; Saudi Arabia	Salahaddin Gojazade; Azerbaijan
70 kg	Mohamad Mardi; United Arab Emirates	Amer Al-Anazi; Saudi Arabia	Yazan Al-Saifi; Jordan
75 kg	Mohammad Yousuf Jahangir; Afghanistan	Mehmet Ali Meriç; Turkey	Inad Baowaydhan; Saudi Arabia
75 kg	Mohammad Yousuf Jahangir; Afghanistan	Mehmet Ali Meriç; Turkey	Youssef Assouik; Morocco
80 kg	Mustafa Al-Tekreeti; Iraq	Majid Hashem Beigi; Iran	Ilyass Hbibali; United Arab Emirates
80 kg	Mustafa Al-Tekreeti; Iraq	Majid Hashem Beigi; Iran	not awarded

=== Women ===
Event	Gold	Silver	Bronze
50 kg	Kaltoum Akhlouf; Morocco	Fereshteh Mirsadeghi; Iran	Damia Binti Azian; Malaysia
50 kg	Kaltoum Akhlouf; Morocco	Fereshteh Mirsadeghi; Iran	Dsovak Keuchkerian; Lebanon
55 kg	Gülistan Turan; Turkey	Zineb Bouhmada; United Arab Emirates	Aziza Mamurova; Uzbekistan
55 kg	Gülistan Turan; Turkey	Zineb Bouhmada; United Arab Emirates	Nur Amisha Azrilrizal; Malaysia
60 kg	Kübra Kocakuş; Turkey	Zahra Akbari; Iran	Mechraoui Belkise; Algeria
60 kg	Kübra Kocakuş; Turkey	Zahra Akbari; Iran	Soha Al-Far; Saudi Arabia
65 kg	Bediha Tacyıldız; Turkey	Fatemeh Hosseinikahaki; Iran	Sevara Dilmurodova; Uzbekistan
65 kg	Bediha Tacyıldız; Turkey	Fatemeh Hosseinikahaki; Iran	not awarded

== Nations ==
A total of 98 athletes from 22 nations competed in weightlifting at the 2025 Islamic Solidarity Games:

1. Afghanistan (2)
2. Algeria (7)
3. Azerbaijan (4)
4. Bahrain (1)
5. Indonesia (3)
6. Iran (7)
7. Iraq (3)
8. Jordan (3)
9. Kazakhstan (6)
10. Kyrgyzstan (3)
11. Lebanon (5)
12. Libya (2)
13. Malaysia (6)
14. Morocco (7)
15. Palestine (3)
16. Saudi Arabia (7)
17. Syria (2)
18. Turkey (8)
19. United Arab Emirates (4)
20. Uzbekistan (6)
21. Yemen (2)

== Results ==
=== Men's 60 kg ===
Round of 16
Abdulla Ali (BHR)	9
Wassof Bin Rumijam (MAS)	10
Khasan Salomov (UZB)	30
Ahmad Al-Haddad (JOR)	26
Al-Baraa Al-Amoudi (KSA)	27
Turar Duisekhan (KAZ)	30

Quarterfinals
Mahmood Abdo Rageh (YEM)	27
Wassof Bin Rumijam (MAS)	30
Suhayb Al-Minsali (LBA)	27
Ayad Al-Badr (IRQ)	30
Ali Aliyev (AZE)	30
Khasan Salomov (UZB)	27
Turar Duisekhan (KAZ)	0
Adel Khalil (PLE)	0

Semifinals
Wassof Bin Ruminam (MAS)
Ayad Al-Badr (IRQ)	WO
Ali Aliyev (AZE)	27
Turar Duisekhan (KAZ)	30

Final
Ayad Al-Badr (IRQ)	28
Turar Duisekhan (KAZ)	29

=== Men's 65 kg ===
Round of 16
Ibrahim Al-Nawasi (UAE)	29
Abil Galyev (KAZ)	28
Djahongir Muhiddinov (UZB)	27
Masoud Abdolmaleki (IRN)	30
Xayal Aliyev (AZE)	WO
Reda Hammouda (EGY)
Abdulaziz Bin Mubrad (KSA)	25
Hamza Rachid (MAR)	30
Ahmad Bin Rakib (MAS)
Salah Hasan (IRQ)	WO
Ait Ouali Messipsa (ALG)	28
Ernar Amanzholov (KGZ)	29

Quarterfinals
Ameer Amle (PLE)	30
Ibrahim Al-Nawasi (UAE)	27
Masoud Abdolmaleki (IRN)	27
Xayal Aliyev (AZE)	30
Hamza Rachid (MAR)	29
Salah Hasan (IRQ)	28
Ernar Amanzholov (KGZ)
Sercan Koç (TUR)	WO

Semifinals
Ameer Amle (PLE)	27
Xayal Aliyev (AZE)	30
Hamza Rachid (MAR)	0
Sercan Koç (TUR)	0

Final
Xayal Aliyev (AZE)	10
Hamza Rachid (MAR)	9

=== Men's 70 kg ===
Round of 16
Mohamad Bin Rosli (MAS)
Saifallah Kandil (EGY)	WO
Aiham Al-Awadhi (YEM)	0
Salahaddin Gojazade (AZE)	0
Abed Mohamed Yacine (ALG)	27
Ali Bilben (TUR)	30
Mohamad Mardi (UAE)	29
Abdelali Zahidi (MAR)	28

Quarterfinals
Amer Al-Anazi (KSA)	WO
Saifallah Kandil (EGY)
Salahaddin Gojazade (AZE)	29
Nurtaza Jumakhanov (KAZ)	28
Yazan Al-Saifi (JOR)	20
Ali Bilben (TUR)	18
Mohamad Mardi (UAE)	10
Muayid Al-Tikbali (LBA)	9

Semifinals
Amer Al-Anazi (KSA)	29
Salahaddin Gojazade (AZE)	28
Yazan Al-Saifi (JOR)	9
Mohamad Mardi (UAE)	10

Final
Amer Al-Anazi (KSA)	9
Mohamad Mardi (UAE)	10

=== Men's 75 kg ===
Round of 16
Ammarul Bin Ubaidillah (MAS)
Ardiansyah (INA)	WO
Youssef Assouik (MAR)	30
Hossein Farahani (IRN)	27
Malek Saker (ALG)	WO
Igor Kovalenko (KAZ)

Quarterfinals
Mohammad Yousuf Jahangir (AFG)	30
Ardiansyah (INA)	27
Mostafa Mahran (EGY)
Inad Baowaydhan (KSA)	WO
Juan Seif (LIB)	9
Youssef Assouik (MAR)	10
Malek Saker (ALG)	27
Mehmet Ali Meriç (TUR)	30

Semifinals
Mohammad Yousuf Jahangir (AFG)	29
Inad Baowaydhan (KSA)	28
Youssef Assouik (MAR)	28
Mehmet Ali Meriç (TUR)	29

Final
Mohammad Yousuf Jahangir (AFG)	29
Mehmet Ali Meriç (TUR)	28

=== Men's 80 kg ===
Quarterfinals		Semifinals		Final
		Ilyass Hbibali (UAE)	27
Ali Fakih (LIB)	26	Mustafa Al-Tekreeti (IRQ)	30
Mustafa Al-Tekreeti (IRQ)	30			Mustafa Al-Tekreeti (IRQ)	30
Alexandr Tsarikov (KAZ)	9			Majid Hashem Beigi (IRN)	26
Said Hamid Sadat (AFG)	10	Said Hamid Sadat (AFG)	28
Nejat Derin (TUR)	28	Majid Hashem Beigi (IRN)	29
Majid Hashem Beigi (IRN)	29

Bronze medals
Ilyass Hbibali (UAE)	30
Said Hamid Sadat (AFG)	27

=== Women's 50 kg ===
Round of 16
Amalia Kemelbaeva (KGZ)	8
Dania Ouhachi (ALG)	10
Zinab Edris (EGY)
Dsovak Keuchkarian (LIB)	WO

Quarterfinals
Damia Binti Azian (MAS)	29
Dania Ouhachi (ALG)	28
Özlem Melek Korkmaz (TUR)	28
Kaltoum Akhlouf (MAR)	29
Shoirakhon Abdukholikova (UZB)	28
Fereshteh Hassanzadeh Mirsadeghi (IRN)	29
Dsovak Keuchkarian (LIB)	WO
Hattan Al-Saif (KSA)

Semifinals
Damia Binti Azian (MAS)
Kaltoum Akhlouf (MAR)	WO
Fereshteh Hassanzadeh Mirsadeghi (IRN)	30
Dsovak Keuchkarian (LIB)	26

Final
Kaltoum Akhlouf (MAR)	30
Fereshteh Hassanzadeh Mirsadeghi (IRN)	27

=== Women's 55 kg ===
Round of 16
Aziza Mamurova (UZB)	30
Mariana Hijazi (LIB)	25
Fatemeh Mamani (IRN)	27
Zineb Bouhmada (UAE)	30
Angelina Runtukahu (INA)	20
Dana Al-Ghussein (KSA)	18
Nur Binti Azrilrizal (MAS)	WO
Rana Elsayed Mohamed (EGY)
Romaysae Bouarouro (MAR)	9
Fedoua Krelouf (ALG)	10

Quarterfinals
Dana Kilani (JOR)	26
Aziza Mamurova (UZB)	30
Zineb Bouhmada (UAE)	10
Angelina Runtukahu (INA)	9
Samra Al-Nadaf (SYR)
Nur Binti Azrilrizal (MAS)	WO
Romaysae Bouarouro (MAR)	27
Gülistan Turan (TUR)	30

Semifinals
Aziza Mamurova (UZB)	27
Zineb Bouhmada (UAE)	30
Nur Binti Azrilrizal (MAS)	26
Gülistan Turan (TUR)	30

Final
Zineb Bouhmada (UAE)	27
Gülistan Turan (TUR)	30

=== Women's 60 kg ===
Round of 16
Kübra Kocakuş (TUR)	30
Abeer Samhan (JOR)	24
Soha Al-Far (KSA)	0
Samra Al-Nadaf (SYR)	0
Adelia Asylbek Kyzy (KGZ)	27
Zahra Akbari (IRN)	30

Quarterfinals
Emili Rzayeva (AZE)	18
Kübra Kocakuş (TUR)	20
Belkise Mechraoui (ALG)	29
Kaouthar Baarab (MAR)	28
Antonia Bui Ola (INA)	28
Soha Al-Far (KSA)	29
Zahra Akbari (IRN)	20
Bahora Khushvaktova (UZB)	17

Semifinals
Kübra Kocakuş (TUR)	29
Belkise Mechraoui (ALG)	28
Soha Al-Far (KSA)	27
Zahra Akbari (IRN)	30

Final
Kübra Kocakuş (TUR)	29
Zahra Akbari (IRN)	28

=== Women's 65 kg ===
Quarterfinals		Semifinals		Final
Dounia Mediouni (ALG)	29
Alyona Ozheredova (KAZ)	28	Dounia Mediouni (ALG)	27
Sara El Batal (LIB)	0	Fatemeh Hosseinikahaki (IRN)	30
Fatemeh Hosseinikahaki (IRN)	0			Fatemeh Hosseinikahaki (IRN)	27
Bediha Tacyıldız (TUR)	30			Bediha Tacyıldız (TUR)	30
Salma Mhrar (MAR)	27	Bediha Tacyıldız (TUR)	29
Sevara Dilmurodova (UZB)	WO	Sevara Dilmurodova (UZB)	28
Joumana Elzalabany (EGY)

Bronze medals
Dounia Mediouni (ALG)	27
Sevara Dilmurodova (UZB)	30
