= Lapikov =

Lapikov (Russian: Лапиков) is a Russian masculine surname, its feminine counterpart is Lapikova. Notable people with the surname include:

- Dmitry Lapikov (born 1982), Russian weightlifter
- Ivan Lapikov (1922–1993), Soviet and Russian actor
