= Mikhail Audzeyeu =

Belarusian weightlifter (born 1982)

Personal information
- Nationality: Belarusian
- Born: 2 February 1982 (age 43)

Sport
- Sport: Weightlifting

Mikhail Audzeyeu (born 2 February 1982) is a Belarusian weightlifter. He competed in the men's heavyweight event at the 2004 Summer Olympics.
