= Weightlifting at the 2026 Asian Games – Women's +86 kg =

Women's +86 kg at the 2026 Asian Games
- Venue: Nagoya Trade & Industry Center
- Date: 29 September 2026
- Competitors: 7 from 7 nations

Medalists
| gold medal | Li Wenwen | China |
| silver medal | Park Hye-jeong | South Korea |
| bronze medal | Ouisal Ikhlef | Qatar |

The women's +86 kilograms competition at the 2026 Asian Games was held on 29 September 2026 at the Nagoya Trade & Industry Center.

== Schedule ==
All times are Japan Standard Time (UTC+09:00)

| Date | Time | Event |
|---|---|---|
| Tuesday, 29 September 2026 | 16:20 | Group A |

== Records ==
Prior to this competition, the existing world, Asian and Games records were as follows.

| World Record | Snatch | Li Yan (CHN) | 145 kg | Gandhinagar, India | 17 May 2026 |
| World Record | Clean & Jerk | World Standard | 181 kg | — | 1 June 2025 |
| World Record | Total | World Standard | 325 kg | — | 1 June 2025 |
| Asian Record | Snatch | Li Yan (CHN) | 145 kg | Gandhinagar, India | 17 May 2026 |
| Asian Record | Clean & Jerk | Asian Standard | 181 kg | — | 1 June 2025 |
| Asian Record | Total | Asian Standard | 325 kg | — | 1 June 2025 |
| Games Record | Snatch | Asian Games Standard | 129 kg | — | 1 August 2026 |
| Games Record | Clean & Jerk | Asian Games Standard | 173 kg | — | 1 August 2026 |
| Games Record | Total | Asian Games Standard | 300 kg | — | 1 August 2026 |

== Results ==
| Rank | Athlete | Group | Snatch (kg) | | | | Clean & Jerk (kg) | | | | Total |
| Rank | Athlete | Group | 1 | 2 | 3 | Result | 1 | 2 | 3 | Result | Total |
|---|---|---|---|---|---|---|---|---|---|---|---|
| 1st place, gold medalist(s) | Li Wenwen (CHN) | A | 132 | 136 | 140 | 140 | 166 | 170 | ~~175~~ | 170 | 310 |
| 2nd place, silver medalist(s) | Park Hye-jeong (KOR) | A | 128 | 130 | 133 | 133 | 163 | 167 | ~~173~~ | 167 | 300 |
| 3rd place, bronze medalist(s) | Ouisal Ikhlef (QAT) | A | 120 | ~~129~~ | ~~131~~ | 120 | 153 | ~~168~~ | ~~173~~ | 153 | 273 |
| 4 | Lyubov Kovalchuk (KAZ) | A | 110 | 115 | ~~120~~ | 115 | 145 | 148 | 152 | 152 | 267 |
| 5 | Motoka Nakajima (JPN) | A | 105 | ~~108~~ | ~~108~~ | 105 | 132 | 137 | 140 | 140 | 245 |
| 6 | Supatchanin Khamhaeng (THA) | A | 100 | ~~105~~ | 105 | 105 | 128 | 133 | 136 | 136 | 241 |
| 7 | Batbayaryn Enkhjin (MGL) | A | 95 | 99 | 102 | 102 | 122 | ~~127~~ | ~~128~~ | 122 | 224 |

== New records ==
The following records were established during the competition.

| Snatch | 130 | Park Hye-jeong (KOR) | GR |
| Snatch | 132 | Li Wenwen (CHN) | GR |
| Snatch | 133 | Park Hye-jeong (KOR) | GR |
| Snatch | 136 | Li Wenwen (CHN) | GR |
| Snatch | 140 | Li Wenwen (CHN) | GR |
| Total | 306 | Li Wenwen (CHN) | GR |
| Total | 310 | Li Wenwen (CHN) | GR |
