= Rafiatu Lawal =

Nigerian weightlifter (born 1996)

Personal information
- Full name: Rafiatu Folashade Lawal
- Born: 12 November 1996 (age 29)

Sport
- Country: Nigeria
- Sport: Weightlifting
- Weight class: 59 kg
Medal record
Women's weightlifting
Representing Nigeria
World Championships
Silver medal – second place	2025 Førde	58 kg
African Games
Gold medal – first place	2019 Rabat	59 kg
Gold medal – first place	2023 Accra	59 kg
African Championships
Gold medal – first place	2021 Nairobi	59 kg
Gold medal – first place	2023 Tunis	59 kg
Gold medal – first place	2026 Ismailia	58 kg
Commonwealth Games
Gold medal – first place	2022 Birmingham	59 kg
Gold medal – first place	2026 Glasgow	58 kg
Commonwealth Championships
Gold medal – first place	2021 Tashkent	59 kg
Islamic Solidarity Games
Gold medal – first place	2025 Riyadh	58 kg

Rafiatu Folashade Lawal (born 12 November 1996) is a Nigerian weightlifter. She won the gold medal in the women's 59 kg event at the 2022 Commonwealth Games held in Birmingham, England. She represented Nigeria at the 2024 Summer Olympics in Paris, France. In 2019, she represented Nigeria at the African Games held in Rabat, Morocco and she won the gold medal in the women's 59 kg event.

She won the gold medal in her event at the 2021 African Weightlifting Championships held in Nairobi, Kenya.

== Career ==
At the 2019 African Games held in Rabat, Morocco, she won the gold medal in the women's 59 kg event. She also won the gold medal in both the Snatch and Clean & Jerk events. She also set a new African record of 93 kg in the Snatch event.

She competed in the women's 59 kg event at the 2021 World Weightlifting Championships held in Tashkent, Uzbekistan. She finished in 6th place in this competition. The 2021 Commonwealth Weightlifting Championships were also held at the same time and her total result gave her the gold medal in this event. As a result, she qualified to compete at the 2022 Commonwealth Games in Birmingham, England.

She won the gold medal in the women's 59 kg event at the 2022 Commonwealth Games held in Birmingham, England. She also set new Commonwealth Games records in the Snatch (90 kg), Clean & Jerk (116 kg) and Total (206 kg).

In March 2024, she won the gold medal in the women's 59 kg event at the 2023 African Games held in Accra, Ghana. In August 2024, she competed in the women's 59 kg event at the 2024 Summer Olympics held in Paris, France. She finished in fifth place with 230 kg in total.

== Achievements ==
Year	Venue	Weight	Snatch (kg)				Clean & Jerk (kg)				Total	Rank
Year	Venue	Weight	1	2	3	Rank	1	2	3	Rank	Total	Rank
Summer Olympics
2024	Paris, France	59 kg	100	~~103~~	~~103~~	—N/a	~~125~~	~~127~~	130	—N/a	230	5
World Championships
2021	Tashkent, Uzbekistan	59 kg	89	~~92~~	92	6	108	112	115	7	207	6
2023	Riyadh, Saudi Arabia	59 kg	95	~~100~~	100	5	120	125	~~130~~	7	225	6
2025	Førde, Norway	58 kg	99	101; AF	~~104~~	2nd place, silver medalist(s)	126	128; AF	~~133~~	2nd place, silver medalist(s)	229; AF	2nd place, silver medalist(s)
IWF World Cup
2024	Phuket, Thailand	59 kg	96	~~101~~	101	7	121	126	~~128~~	7	227	8
Commonwealth Games
2022	Birmingham, England	59 kg	90	~~94~~	~~95~~	—N/a	110	115	116	—N/a	206	1st place, gold medalist(s)
African Games
2019	Rabat, Morocco	59 kg	90	93	~~95~~	1st place, gold medalist(s)	111	115	117	1st place, gold medalist(s)	210	1st place, gold medalist(s)
2024	Accra, Ghana	59 kg	85	—	—	1st place, gold medalist(s)	105	—	—	1st place, gold medalist(s)	190	1st place, gold medalist(s)
African Championships
2021	Nairobi, Kenya	59 kg	88	90	~~92~~	1st place, gold medalist(s)	109	111	~~115~~	1st place, gold medalist(s)	201	1st place, gold medalist(s)
2023	Tunis, Tunisia	59 kg	~~91~~	91	95	1st place, gold medalist(s)	~~115~~	115	122	1st place, gold medalist(s)	217	1st place, gold medalist(s)
2026	Ismailia, Egypt	59 kg	~~95~~	95	~~97~~	1st place, gold medalist(s)	115	119	~~122~~	1st place, gold medalist(s)	214	1st place, gold medalist(s)
Commonwealth Championships
2021	Tashkent, Uzbekistan	59 kg	89	~~92~~	92	—N/a	108	112	115	—N/a	207	1st place, gold medalist(s)
