= Malaysia at the Islamic Solidarity Games =

- IOC code: MAS
- NOC: Olympic Council of Malaysia
- Medals Ranked 11th: Gold 33 Silver 23 Bronze 44 Total 100

Islamic Solidarity Games appearances (overview)
- 2005; 2013; 2017; 2021; 2025

Malaysia has taken part in every edition of the Islamic Solidarity Games since the first tournament held in Mecca, 2005. By 2025, data from the Islamic Solidarity Sports Federation shows that Malaysian competitors have secured 100 medals in total — including 33 gold, 23 silver, and 44 bronze. Overall, Malaysian holds the top 11th position in the medal table as off the last Islamic Solidarity Games held in Riyadh, Saudi Arabia. Malaysia will host the 2029 Islamic Solidarity Games in Selangor for the first time in its history.

== Medal tables ==
=== Medals by Islamic Solidarity Games ===
Host nation

Below is the table representing all Malaysian medals in the games. Until now, Malaysia has won 100 medals (33 gold, 23 silver, and 44 bronze).

Games	Athletes	Gold	Silver	Bronze	Total	Rank	Notes	RF
(Saudi Arabia) 2005 Mecca		5	5	6	16	7th	details	
(Iran) 2010 Tehran	Canceled							
(Indonesia) 2013 Palembang		26	17	29	72	4th	details	
(Azerbaijan) 2017 Baku		0	0	2	2	38th	details	
(Turkey) 2021 Konya		2	1	4	7	19th	details	
(Saudi Arabia) 2025 Riyadh		0	0	3	3	37th	details	
(Malaysia) 2029 Selangor	Future event							
Total		33	23	44	100	11th	-	-

== See also ==
- Malaysia at the Olympics
- Malaysia at the Paralympics
- Malaysia at the Asian Games
- Malaysia at the Commonwealth Games
- Sports in Malaysia
