= Jessica Gordon Brown =

English weightlifter (born 1995)

Personal information
- Nationality: British (English)
- Born: 25 December 1995 (age 30) Harefield, Greater London, England

Sport
- Sport: weightlifting
- Event: -59kg
Medal record
Women's weightlifting
Representing England
Commonwealth Games
Silver medal – second place	2022 Birmingham	59 kg

Jessica Mary Gordon Brown (born 25 December 1995) is an English weightlifter. She has represented England at the Commonwealth Games and won a silver medal.

== Biography ==
Gordon Brown was educated at the University of Brighton, competing in judo and acrobatic gymnastics before turning to weightlifting. As a teenager, she was a double national acrobatic gymnastics champion. In 2021, she won the national weightlifting senior title in her weight category and finished 12th at the World Championships, in the 59 kg category.

In 2022, she was selected for the 2022 Commonwealth Games in Birmingham, where she competed in the women's 59 kg category, winning the silver medal.
