= Dadash Dadashbayli =

Azerbaijani weightlifter (born 1996)

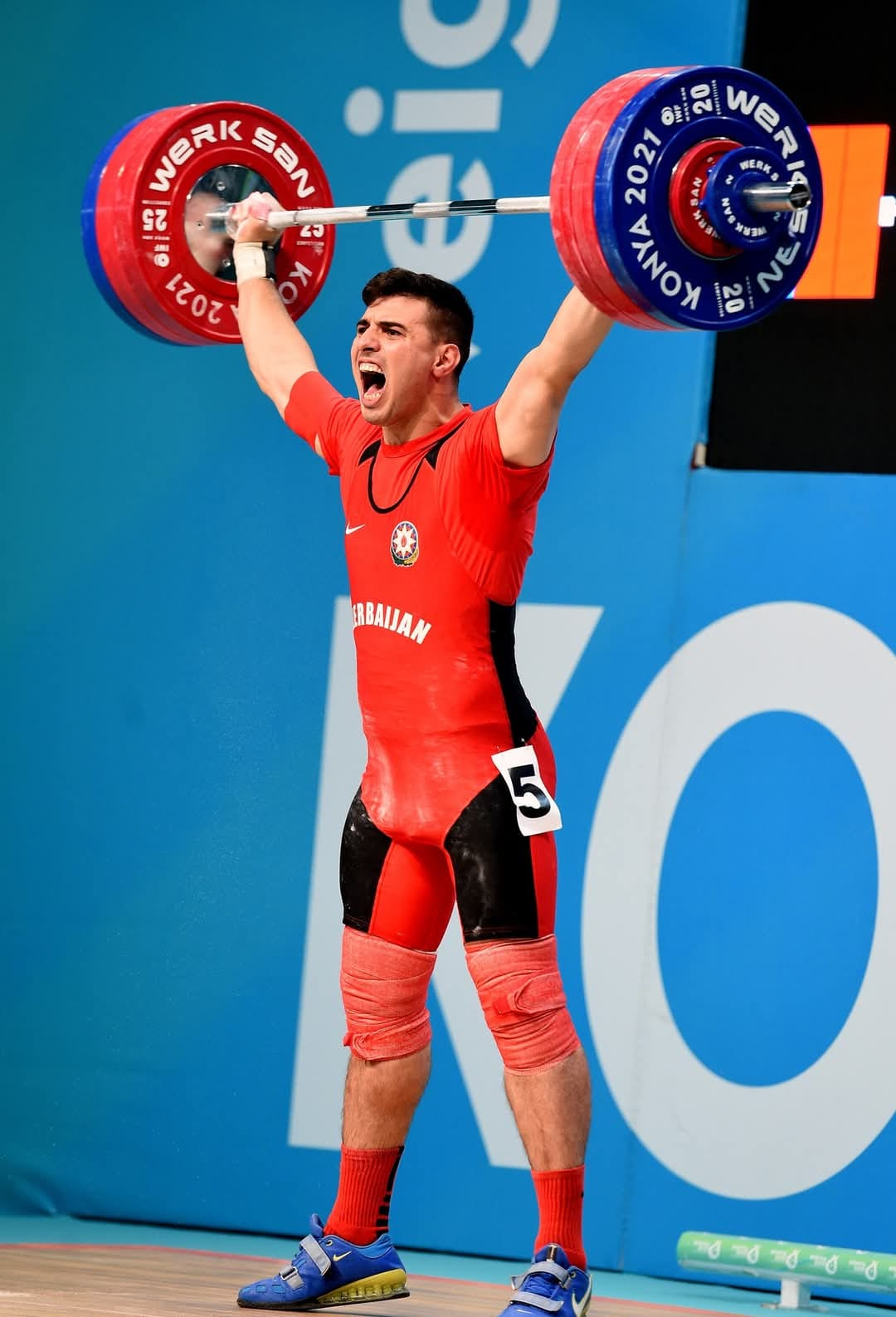
- Dadashbayli at the 2021 Islamic Solidarity Games in Konya (15 August 2022)

Personal information
- Full name: Dadash Nurulla oglu Dadashbayli
- Nationality: Azerbaijan
- Born: 15 July 1996 (age 29) Gobustan District, Azerbaijan

Sport
- Sport: Weightlifting
- Events: –102 kg, –109 kg, –110 kg
Medal record
Men's Weightlifting
Representing Azerbaijan
World Championships
Silver medal – second place	2024 Manama	109 kg
Bronze medal – third place	2023 Riyadh	109 kg
European Championships
Gold medal – first place	2024 Sofia	109 kg
Bronze medal – third place	2021 Moscow	102 kg
IWF World Cup
Silver medal – second place	2024 Phuket	109 kg
CIS Games
Gold medal – first place	2023 Minsk	109 kg
Islamic Solidarity Games
Silver medal – second place	2025 Riyadh	110 kg

Dadash Dadashbayli (Dadaş Nurulla oğlu Dadaşbəyli; born 15 July 1996) is an Azerbaijani weightlifter. He is the 2024 European champion, a silver medalist at the 2024 World Weightlifting Championships, a bronze medalist at the 2023 World Weightlifting Championships, and a gold medalist at the 2023 CIS Games.

== Career ==
Dadashbayli was born in the Gobustan District of Azerbaijan. He graduated from the Azerbaijan State Academy of Physical Education and Sport in 2018. His first coach was Shamsi Safarli.

He began competing in 2007 at the Azerbaijani Youth Weightlifting Championship. In 2009, he became the national youth champion, and in 2012 won the national silver medal, earning a place on the national team.

At the 2012 European Youth Championships, he placed 9th in the 85 kg category, and later that year finished 13th at the World Youth Championships. In 2013, he competed in the 94 kg class, taking 4th at the World Youth Championships and winning silver at the European U17 Championships.

In 2014, he made his senior debut at the 2014 World Weightlifting Championships in Almaty, finishing 13th in the 94 kg division with a total of 365 kg. The following year, he won the European Junior Weightlifting Championships (105 kg) with 382 kg and competed at the 2015 World Weightlifting Championships in Houston, but did not register a total.

At the 2021 European Weightlifting Championships in Moscow, he competed in the 102 kg category. He lifted 177 kg in the snatch to win the small gold medal, and 202 kg in the clean & jerk, finishing 7th in that lift and taking bronze overall with 379 kg.

At the 2023 World Weightlifting Championships in Riyadh, Saudi Arabia, he won the bronze medal in the 109 kg category with a total of 403 kg, including small bronze medals in both lifts. In August 2023, he won the gold medal at the 2023 CIS Games in Minsk, Belarus. At the 2023 IWF Grand Prix in Doha, Qatar, he won gold in the snatch (176 kg), silver in the clean & jerk (212 kg), and overall gold with 388 kg.

At the 2024 European Weightlifting Championships held in Sofia, Bulgaria, he won three gold medals (snatch, clean & jerk, and total) in the 109 kg category, lifting 176 kg, 212 kg, and a total of 388 kg. In December 2024, at the 2024 World Weightlifting Championships in Manama, Bahrain, he won the silver medal in the 109 kg category with a total of 404 kg (183 kg snatch and 221 kg clean & jerk). In April 2024, at the 2024 IWF World Cup in Phuket, Thailand, he won three silver medals (snatch, clean & jerk, and total) with 177 kg + 211 kg = 388 kg. The event also served as a qualification tournament for the 2024 Summer Olympics. There he did not compete for unattested reasons, as did no other weightlifters from Azerbaijan. In the new 110 kg category he won two silver medals (snatch and total) 180 kg and 211 kg for a total of 381 kg at the 2025 Islamic Solidarity Games. In Førde at the 2025 World Weightlifting Championships he lifted a total of 385 kg which placed him 13th overall.
