= Weightlifting at the 2025 Islamic Solidarity Games =

- Venue: Boulevard City 1
- Dates: 8—12 November 2025
- Competitors: 164 from 31 nations

The weightlifting tournament at the 2025 Islamic Solidarity Games in Riyadh was held between 8—12 November 2025. The weightlifting competition took place at Boulevard City 1 in Saudi Arabia. Each country could only have one athlete in each weight category. Except host country, Saudi Arabia, all other countries could only have a maximum of 10 athletes (5 man + 5 woman).

== Medal table ==
* Host nation (Saudi Arabia)

Rank	Nation	Gold	Silver	Bronze	Total
1	Turkey	13	5	3	21
2	Egypt	7	2	7	16
3	Uzbekistan	6	9	5	20
4	Nigeria	6	4	3	13
5	Bahrain	5	1	0	6
6	Indonesia	3	7	1	11
7	Kazakhstan	3	4	5	12
8	Qatar	3	0	0	3
9	Iran	2	4	9	15
10	Azerbaijan	0	5	6	11
11	Iraq	0	3	0	3
12	Albania	0	2	0	2
13	Saudi Arabia*	0	1	5	6
14	Oman	0	1	1	2
15	Bangladesh	0	0	3	3
Totals (15 entries)		48	48	48	144

== Medal overview ==
=== Men ===
Event		Gold		Silver		Bronze	
– 60 kg	Snatch	Muhammad Husni (INA)	129 kg	Aqeel Al-Jasim (KSA)	124 kg	Burak Aykun (TUR)	119 kg
– 60 kg	Clean & Jerk	Muhammad Husni (INA)	154 kg	Burak Aykun (TUR)	148 kg	Ali Elsayed (EGY)	147 kg
– 60 kg	Total	Muhammad Husni (INA)	283 kg	Burak Aykun (TUR)	267 kg	Ali Elsayed (EGY)	265 kg
– 65 kg	Snatch	Muhammed Furkan Özbek (TUR)	140 kg	Leonardo Adventino Geovani (INA)	139 kg	Adkhamjon Ergashev (UZB)	134 kg
– 65 kg	Clean & Jerk	Adkhamjon Ergashev (UZB)	170 kg	Muhammed Furkan Özbek (TUR)	170 kg	Seraj Al-Saleem (KSA)	169 kg
– 65 kg	Total	Muhammed Furkan Özbek (TUR)	310 kg	Adkhamjon Ergashev (UZB)	304 kg	Seraj Al-Saleem (KSA)	303 kg
– 71 kg	Snatch	Edidiong Umoafia (NGR)	151 kg AF	Diyorbek Ruzmetov (UZB)	148 kg	Isa Rustamov (AZE)	147 kg
– 71 kg	Clean & Jerk	Yusuf Fehmi Genç (TUR)	190 kg	Isa Rustamov (AZE)	177 kg	Edidiong Umoafia (NGR)	175 kg AF
– 71 kg	Total	Yusuf Fehmi Genç (TUR)	336 kg	Edidiong Umoafia (NGR)	326 kg AF	Isa Rustamov (AZE)	324 kg
– 79 kg	Snatch	Abdelrahman Younes (EGY)	166 kg WR	Ravin Almammadov (AZE)	155 kg	Yedige Yemberdi (KAZ)	152 kg
– 79 kg	Clean & Jerk	Abdelrahman Younes (EGY)	196 kg	Yedige Yemberdi (KAZ)	191 kg	Ravin Almammadov (AZE)	190 kg ER
– 79 kg	Total	Abdelrahman Younes (EGY)	362 kg WR	Ravin Almammadov (AZE)	345 kg ER	Yedige Yemberdi (KAZ)	343 kg
– 88 kg	Snatch	Ilia Salehipour (IRI)	162 kg	Sarvarbek Zafarjonov (UZB)	161 kg	Yousef Al-Medarham (KSA)	154 kg
– 88 kg	Clean & Jerk	Sarvarbek Zafarjonov (UZB)	202 kg	Amur Al-Khanjari (OMA)	201 kg	Ilia Salehipour (IRI)	197 kg
– 88 kg	Total	Sarvarbek Zafarjonov (UZB)	363 kg	Ilia Salehipour (IRI)	359 kg	Amur Al-Khanjari (OMA)	354 kg
– 94 kg	Snatch	Nurgissa Adiletuly (KAZ)	175 kg	Alireza Moeini (IRI)	171 kg	Hakan Şükrü Kurnaz (TUR)	165 kg
– 94 kg	Clean & Jerk	Nurgissa Adiletuly (KAZ)	210 kg	Karim Abokahla (EGY)	206 kg AF	Alireza Moeini (IRI)	203 kg
– 94 kg	Total	Nurgissa Adiletuly (KAZ)	385 kg	Alireza Moeini (IRI)	374 kg	Karim Abokahla (EGY)	370 kg
– 110 kg	Snatch	Akbar Djuraev (UZB)	193 kg	Dadash Dadashbayli (AZE)	180 kg	Ali Al-Khazal (KSA)	175 kg
– 110 kg	Clean & Jerk	Akbar Djuraev (UZB)	227 kg	Alireza Nassiri (IRI)	224 kg	Artyom Antropov (KAZ)	223 kg
– 110 kg	Total	Akbar Djuraev (UZB)	420 kg	Dadash Dadashbayli (AZE)	391 kg	Ali Al-Khazal (KSA)	391 kg
+ 110 kg	Snatch	Gor Minasyan (BHR)	213 kg AS	Ali Rubaiawi (IRQ)	212 kg	Sharofiddin Amriddinov (UZB)	188 kg
+ 110 kg	Clean & Jerk	Gor Minasyan (BHR)	247 kg	Ali Rubaiawi (IRQ)	246 kg	Reza Hassanpour (IRI)	243 kg
+ 110 kg	Total	Gor Minasyan (BHR)	460 kg AS	Ali Rubaiawi (IRQ)	458 kg	Reza Hassanpour (IRI)	425 kg

=== Women ===
Event		Gold		Silver		Bronze	
– 48 kg	Snatch	Gamze Altun (TUR)	72 kg	Tita Nurcahya Melyani (INA)	68 kg	Nuray Abilova (AZE)	65 kg
– 48 kg	Clean & Jerk	Gamze Altun (TUR)	100 kg	Tita Nurcahya Melyani (INA)	85 kg	Nuray Abilova (AZE)	79 kg
– 48 kg	Total	Gamze Altun (TUR)	172 kg	Tita Nurcahya Melyani (INA)	153 kg	Nuray Abilova (AZE)	144 kg
– 53 kg	Snatch	Cansel Özkan (TUR)	88 kg	Basilia Bamerop Ninggan (INA)	75 kg	Marjia Akter Ekra (BAN)	72 kg
– 53 kg	Clean & Jerk	Cansel Özkan (TUR)	100 kg	Basilia Bamerop Ninggan (INA)	99 kg	Marjia Akter Ekra (BAN)	91 kg
– 53 kg	Total	Cansel Özkan (TUR)	188 kg	Basilia Bamerop Ninggan (INA)	174 kg	Marjia Akter Ekra (BAN)	163 kg
– 58 kg	Snatch	Rafiatu Lawal (NGR)	98 kg	Nigora Abdullaeva (UZB)	96 kg	Noura Essam (EGY)	83 kg
– 58 kg	Clean & Jerk	Rafiatu Lawal (NGR)	122 kg	Nigora Abdullaeva (UZB)	118 kg	Noura Essam (EGY)	106 kg
– 58 kg	Total	Rafiatu Lawal (NGR)	220 kg	Nigora Abdullaeva (UZB)	214 kg	Noura Essam (EGY)	189 kg
– 63 kg	Snatch	Aysel Özkan (TUR)	98 kg	Enkileda Carja (ALB)	97 kg	Ruth Ayodele (NGR)	95 kg
– 63 kg	Clean & Jerk	Aysel Özkan (TUR)	118 kg	Ruth Ayodele (NGR)	117 kg	Nadita Aprilia (INA)	117 kg
– 63 kg	Total	Aysel Özkan (TUR)	216 kg	Enkileda Carja (ALB)	213 kg	Ruth Ayodele (NGR)	212 kg
– 69 kg	Snatch	Islamiyat Yusuf (NGR)	110 kg AF	Ingrid Segura (BHR)	106 kg	Nuray Güngör (TUR)	105 kg
– 69 kg	Clean & Jerk	Ingrid Segura (BHR)	128 kg	Nuray Güngör (TUR)	128 kg	Reihaneh Karimi (IRI)	126 kg
– 69 kg	Total	Ingrid Segura (BHR)	234 kg	Nuray Güngör (TUR)	233 kg	Reihaneh Karimi (IRI)	221 kg
– 77 kg	Snatch	Sarah Matthew (NGR)	116 kg AF	Sara Ahmed (EGY)	115 kg	Zahra Hosseini (IRI)	97 kg
– 77 kg	Clean & Jerk	Sara Ahmed (EGY)	145 kg AF	Sarah Matthew (NGR)	129 kg	Ayanat Zhumagali (KAZ)	128 kg
– 77 kg	Total	Sara Ahmed (EGY)	260 kg AF	Sarah Matthew (NGR)	245 kg	Ayanat Zhumagali (KAZ)	221 kg
– 86 kg	Snatch	Rahma Ahmed (EGY)	116 kg	Rigina Adashbaeva (UZB)	105 kg	Mahsa Beheshti (IRI)	104 kg
– 86 kg	Clean & Jerk	Mahsa Beheshti (IRI)	134 kg	Rigina Adashbaeva (UZB)	133 kg	Rahma Ahmed (EGY)	127 kg
– 86 kg	Total	Rahma Ahmed (EGY)	243 kg	Rigina Adashbaeva (UZB)	238 kg	Mahsa Beheshti (IRI)	238 kg
+ 86 kg	Snatch	Ouisal Ikhlef (QAT)	117 kg	Lyubov Kovalchuk (KAZ)	117 kg	Tursunoy Jabborova (UZB)	116 kg
+ 86 kg	Clean & Jerk	Ouisal Ikhlef (QAT)	160 kg	Lyubov Kovalchuk (KAZ)	150 kg	Tursunoy Jabborova (UZB)	138 kg
+ 86 kg	Total	Ouisal Ikhlef (QAT)	277 kg	Lyubov Kovalchuk (KAZ)	267 kg	Tursunoy Jabborova (UZB)	254 kg

== Participating nations ==
A total of 164 athletes from 31 nations competed in weightlifting at the 2025 Islamic Solidarity Games:

1. Afghanistan (4)
2. Albania (2)
3. Algeria (8)
4. Azerbaijan (9)
5. Bahrain (2)
6. Bangladesh (8)
7. Brunei (3)
8. Cameroon (9)
9. Egypt (10)
10. Indonesia (9)
11. Iran (10)
12. Iraq (3)
13. Jordan (1)
14. Kazakhstan (8)
15. Kuwait (9)
16. Kyrgyzstan (6)
17. Lebanon (3)
18. Libya (2)
19. Malaysia (3)
20. Nigeria (6)
21. Oman (2)
22. Palestine (1)
23. Qatar (1)
24. Saudi Arabia (12)
25. Sudan (1)
26. Syria (3)
27. Tunisia (2)
28. Turkey (10)
29. United Arab Emirates (3)
30. Uganda (4)
31. Uzbekistan (10)
- Each country could only have one athlete in each weight category.
- Except host country, Saudi Arabia, all other countries could only have a maximum of 10 athletes (5 man + 5 woman).

== Men's results ==
=== Men's 60 kg ===
Rank	Athlete	Group	Snatch (kg)				Clean & Jerk (kg)				Total
Rank	Athlete	Group	1	2	3	Rank	1	2	3	Rank	Total
1st place, gold medalist(s)	Muhammad Husni (INA)	A	~~127~~	127	129	1st place, gold medalist(s)	147	151	154	1st place, gold medalist(s)	283
2nd place, silver medalist(s)	Burak Aykun (TUR)	A	115	~~119~~	119	3rd place, bronze medalist(s)	145	~~148~~	148	2nd place, silver medalist(s)	267
3rd place, bronze medalist(s)	Ali Elsayed (EGY)	A	~~118~~	118	~~120~~	4	147	~~150~~	~~150~~	3rd place, bronze medalist(s)	265
4	Bekbol Sarpashev (KGZ)	A	~~100~~	100	103	5	123	127	~~130~~	4	230
5	Indris Werthi (TUN)	A	95	99	102	6	119	122	~~126~~	6	224
6	Md Ashikur Rahman Taj (BAN)	A	97	101	~~104~~	7	110	~~120~~	120	7	221
7	Davis Niyoyita (UGA)	A	95	~~100~~	~~101~~	8	~~125~~	~~125~~	125	5	220
8	Fahad Al-Otaibi (KUW)	A	75	80	83	9	95	~~100~~	100	8	183
—	Aqeel Al-Jasim (KSA)	A	120	124	~~128~~	2nd place, silver medalist(s)	~~146~~	~~147~~	~~147~~	—	—

=== Men's 65 kg ===
Rank	Athlete	Group	Snatch (kg)				Clean & Jerk (kg)				Total
Rank	Athlete	Group	1	2	3	Rank	1	2	3	Rank	Total
1st place, gold medalist(s)	Muhammed Furkan Özbek (TUR)	A	~~138~~	138	140	1st place, gold medalist(s)	~~170~~	170	—	2nd place, silver medalist(s)	310
2nd place, silver medalist(s)	Adkhamjon Ergashev (UZB)	A	134	~~138~~	~~140~~	3rd place, bronze medalist(s)	167	170	~~177~~	1st place, gold medalist(s)	304
3rd place, bronze medalist(s)	Seraj Al-Saleem (KSA)	A	130	~~134~~	134	5	165	169	~~171~~	3rd place, bronze medalist(s)	303
4	Leonardo Adventino Geovani (INA)	A	131	135	139	2nd place, silver medalist(s)	163	~~167~~	~~167~~	6	302
5	Noureldin Zaky (EGY)	A	130	134	~~139~~	4	158	164	~~167~~	5	298
6	Hafez Ghashghaei (IRI)	A	122	126	~~129~~	7	166	~~170~~	~~171~~	4	292
7	Tehran Mammadov (AZE)	A	128	~~132~~	~~132~~	6	~~145~~	150	~~158~~	7	278
8	Nashrul Abu Bakar (BRU)	A	105	110	113	9	135	~~140~~	~~140~~	8	248
9	Baki Billah (BAN)	A	~~105~~	105	~~110~~	10	~~135~~	135	~~140~~	9	240
10	Faluku Kyambadde (UGA)	A	70	75	80	11	100	105	~~110~~	10	185
—	Elyas Al-Busaidi (OMA)	A	118	~~123~~	~~124~~	8	—	—	—	—	—
—	Mohammad Al-Otaibi (KUW)	A	—	—	—	—	—	—	—	—	—

=== Men's 71 kg ===
Rank	Athlete	Group	Snatch (kg)				Clean & Jerk (kg)				Total
Rank	Athlete	Group	1	2	3	Rank	1	2	3	Rank	Total
1st place, gold medalist(s)	Yusuf Fehmi Genç (TUR)	A	146	~~150~~	~~150~~	4	181	186	190	1st place, gold medalist(s)	336
2nd place, silver medalist(s)	Edidiong Umoafia (NGR)	A	145	149	151	1st place, gold medalist(s)	170	~~175~~	175	3rd place, bronze medalist(s)	326
3rd place, bronze medalist(s)	Isa Rustamov (AZE)	A	144	147	~~149~~	3rd place, bronze medalist(s)	173	~~177~~	177	2nd place, silver medalist(s)	324
4	Diyorbek Ruzmetov (UZB)	A	142	~~147~~	148	2nd place, silver medalist(s)	171	~~176~~	~~176~~	4	319
5	Ahmed Nasar (EGY)	A	134	~~139~~	~~139~~	6	164	~~172~~	~~174~~	6	298
6	Ayoub Salem (TUN)	A	~~134~~	~~134~~	135	5	156	~~160~~	161	7	296
7	Erbol Sarpashev (KGZ)	A	127	~~132~~	~~133~~	8	165	~~170~~	~~170~~	5	292
8	Ali Al-Hawar (KSA)	A	121	~~126~~	127	9	~~154~~	154	~~160~~	9	281
9	Gerard Thibauld Abeussa (CMR)	A	~~115~~	115	~~122~~	10	155	~~160~~	~~165~~	8	275
10	Mohammed Abdulredha (KUW)	A	90	~~100~~	100	11	120	125	~~130~~	10	230
11	Shafiq Jan Sakhi Zada (AFG)	A	84	88	~~92~~	12	97	101	~~106~~	11	189
—	Akram Chekhchoukh (ALG)	A	133	~~136~~	~~136~~	7	~~160~~	~~160~~	~~161~~	—	—
—	Muhammad Shukry (MAS)	A	~~118~~	~~120~~	~~120~~	—	~~152~~	—	—	—	—

=== Men's 79 kg ===
Rank	Athlete	Group	Snatch (kg)				Clean & Jerk (kg)				Total
Rank	Athlete	Group	1	2	3	Rank	1	2	3	Rank	Total
1st place, gold medalist(s)	Abdelrahman Younes (EGY)	A	157	163	166	1st place, gold medalist(s)	190	~~196~~	196	1st place, gold medalist(s)	362
2nd place, silver medalist(s)	Ravin Almammadov (AZE)	A	145	151	155	2nd place, silver medalist(s)	186	~~190~~	190	3rd place, bronze medalist(s)	345
3rd place, bronze medalist(s)	Yedige Yemberdi (KAZ)	A	147	152	~~156~~	3rd place, bronze medalist(s)	187	191	~~194~~	2nd place, silver medalist(s)	343
4	Mohammed Al-Zintani (LBA)	A	151	~~155~~	~~156~~	4	~~187~~	187	~~191~~	4	338
5	Mohammed Al-Marzouq (KSA)	A	146	~~152~~	~~153~~	5	176	~~181~~	~~183~~	6	322
6	Samir Fardjallah (ALG)	A	135	~~141~~	141	7	165	171	~~180~~	7	312
7	Talant Turatbekov (KGZ)	A	140	145	~~150~~	6	160	165	~~170~~	9	310
8	Raihan Adesta Putra Perdana (INA)	A	133	136	~~139~~	8	155	163	168	8	304
9	Issa Al-Blooshi (UAE)	A	120	125	130	10	150	~~155~~	156	10	286
10	Sumon Roy (BAN)	A	114	~~117~~	117	12	~~150~~	~~150~~	153	11	270
11	Sood Al-Mutairi (KUW)	A	110	115	121	11	130	—	—	13	251
12	Muhammad Hj Kamit (BRU)	A	~~110~~	~~110~~	110	13	130	135	~~145~~	12	245
—	Kaan Kahriman (TUR)	A	~~145~~	~~148~~	~~150~~	—	170	178	~~183~~	5	—
—	Roger Brest Sinetang (CMR)	A	~~125~~	125	132	9	~~155~~	~~155~~	~~155~~	—	—

=== Men's 88 kg ===
Rank	Athlete	Group	Snatch (kg)				Clean & Jerk (kg)				Total
Rank	Athlete	Group	1	2	3	Rank	1	2	3	Rank	Total
1st place, gold medalist(s)	Sarvarbek Zafarjonov (UZB)	A	161	~~163~~	~~163~~	2nd place, silver medalist(s)	193	199	202	1st place, gold medalist(s)	363
2nd place, silver medalist(s)	Ilia Salehipour (IRI)	A	153	155	162	1st place, gold medalist(s)	191	197	~~202~~	3rd place, bronze medalist(s)	359
3rd place, bronze medalist(s)	Amur Al-Khanjari (OMA)	A	147	~~152~~	153	4	188	194	201	2nd place, silver medalist(s)	354
4	Yousef Al-Medarham (KSA)	A	151	~~154~~	154	3rd place, bronze medalist(s)	175	182	~~189~~	5	336
5	Daniel Onana Tanga (CMR)	A	140	146	~~152~~	6	~~175~~	176	183	4	329
6	Mohamad Al-Kateb (SYR)	A	138	144	148	5	168	174	177	6	325
7	Sergei Denisenko (KGZ)	A	~~135~~	135	~~140~~	7	160	165	~~170~~	7	310
8	Abdulhameed Akbar (KUW)	A	110	115	121	8	135	141	150	9	304
9	Pranto Shakayet (BAN)	A	120	~~125~~	~~125~~	9	145	~~151~~	151	8	271
10	Zubair Nazari (AFG)	A	100	110	~~115~~	10	135	140	145	10	255

=== Men's 94 kg ===
Rank	Athlete	Group	Snatch (kg)				Clean & Jerk (kg)				Total
Rank	Athlete	Group	1	2	3	Rank	1	2	3	Rank	Total
1st place, gold medalist(s)	Nurgissa Adiletuly (KAZ)	A	170	175	~~183~~	1st place, gold medalist(s)	205	~~210~~	210	1st place, gold medalist(s)	385
2nd place, silver medalist(s)	Alireza Moeini (IRI)	A	171	~~176~~	~~177~~	2nd place, silver medalist(s)	194	199	203	3rd place, bronze medalist(s)	374
3rd place, bronze medalist(s)	Karim Abokahla (EGY)	A	161	164	~~166~~	4	196	201	206	2nd place, silver medalist(s)	370
4	Ertjan Kofsha (ALB)	A	157	161	~~165~~	6	185	190	~~195~~	8	351
5	Ahmed Abuzriba (LBA)	A	~~153~~	153	—	9	195	~~200~~	~~202~~	4	348
6	Ali Al-Othman (KSA)	A	152	157	~~160~~	7	190	~~198~~	~~198~~	7	347
7	Faris Touairi (ALG)	A	156	~~162~~	~~166~~	8	~~190~~	191	~~200~~	5	347
8	Hakan Şükrü Kurnaz (TUR)	A	162	165	~~167~~	3rd place, bronze medalist(s)	~~180~~	180	~~187~~	9	345
9	Desmond Akano (NGR)	A	145	150	~~155~~	10	190	~~195~~	~~197~~	6	340
10	Stephane Tchinda Djou (CMR)	A	~~120~~	121	125	11	150	160	~~165~~	10	285
11	Steven Ojede (UGA)	A	110	~~115~~	~~120~~	12	140	~~145~~	145	11	255
—	Layth Al-Chlaihawi (IRQ)	A	158	~~163~~	163	5	~~197~~	~~197~~	~~198~~	—	—

=== Men's 110 kg ===
Rank	Athlete	Group	Snatch (kg)				Clean & Jerk (kg)				Total
Rank	Athlete	Group	1	2	3	Rank	1	2	3	Rank	Total
1st place, gold medalist(s)	Akbar Djuraev (UZB)	A	183	188	193	1st place, gold medalist(s)	222	227	—	1st place, gold medalist(s)	420
2nd place, silver medalist(s)	Dadash Dadashbayli (AZE)	A	~~174~~	174	180	2nd place, silver medalist(s)	211	~~217~~	~~217~~	6	391
3rd place, bronze medalist(s)	Ali Al-Khazal (KSA)	A	170	175	~~181~~	3rd place, bronze medalist(s)	210	216	~~218~~	4	391
4	Salwan Al-Aifuri (IRQ)	A	~~173~~	173	~~178~~	4	~~213~~	~~213~~	215	5	388
5	Artyom Antropov (KAZ)	A	150	161	~~165~~	7	210	218	223	3rd place, bronze medalist(s)	384
6	Ezzeddin Al-Ghafeer (UAE)	A	~~161~~	162	167	5	195	200	~~203~~	9	367
7	Asem Al-Sallaj (JOR)	A	161	~~166~~	~~166~~	6	198	~~203~~	205	7	366
8	Junior Ngadja Nyabeyeu (CMR)	A	151	156	~~161~~	10	197	202	~~207~~	8	358
9	Hamza Alasad Hallak (SYR)	A	152	157	~~161~~	9	187	~~191~~	—	10	344
10	Mohammed Hamada (PLE)	A	158	~~164~~	~~164~~	8	182	~~192~~	—	11	340
—	Alireza Nassiri (IRI)	A	~~181~~	~~182~~	~~182~~	—	219	224	~~232~~	2nd place, silver medalist(s)	—

=== Men's +110 kg ===
Rank	Athlete	Group	Snatch (kg)				Clean & Jerk (kg)				Total
Rank	Athlete	Group	1	2	3	Rank	1	2	3	Rank	Total
1st place, gold medalist(s)	Gor Minasyan (BHR)	A	205	211	213	1st place, gold medalist(s)	~~241~~	242	247	1st place, gold medalist(s)	460
2nd place, silver medalist(s)	Ali Rubaiawi (IRQ)	A	200	206	212	2nd place, silver medalist(s)	240	~~245~~	246	2nd place, silver medalist(s)	458
3rd place, bronze medalist(s)	Reza Hassanpour (IRI)	A	171	179	182	4	221	232	243	3rd place, bronze medalist(s)	425
4	Sharofiddin Amriddinov (UZB)	A	180	183	188	3rd place, bronze medalist(s)	210	~~222~~	~~222~~	4	398
5	Ali Shukurlu (AZE)	A	170	~~175~~	~~176~~	5	190	200	—	5	370
6	Mohammad Zeitoun (LBN)	A	120	~~125~~	~~125~~	6	155	~~160~~	~~160~~	7	275
—	Muhammad Ripqy Ramadhan (INA)	A	~~145~~	~~145~~	~~145~~	—	180	195	~~200~~	6	—

== Women's results ==
=== Women's 48 kg ===
Rank	Athlete	Group	Snatch (kg)				Clean & Jerk (kg)				Total
Rank	Athlete	Group	1	2	3	Rank	1	2	3	Rank	Total
1st place, gold medalist(s)	Gamze Altun (TUR)	A	67	69	72	1st place, gold medalist(s)	90	~~98~~	100	1st place, gold medalist(s)	172
2nd place, silver medalist(s)	Tita Nurcahya Melyani (INA)	A	62	65	68	2nd place, silver medalist(s)	78	81	85	2nd place, silver medalist(s)	153
3rd place, bronze medalist(s)	Nuray Abilova (AZE)	A	60	~~64~~	65	3rd place, bronze medalist(s)	73	76	79	3rd place, bronze medalist(s)	144
4	Zahra Pouramin (IRI)	A	60	63	~~65~~	5	~~77~~	77	~~80~~	4	140
5	Mst Bristy (BAN)	A	60	~~63~~	64	4	~~75~~	~~75~~	75	5	139
6	Nadia Katbi (ALG)	A	56	~~61~~	~~61~~	6	70	~~76~~	~~76~~	6	126
7	Ghadah Al-Tassan (KSA)	A	47	52	~~55~~	7	60	61	65	7	117
8	Sarah Al-Hawal (KUW)	A	40	43	~~45~~	8	58	61	~~63~~	8	104

=== Women's 53 kg ===
Rank	Athlete	Group	Snatch (kg)				Clean & Jerk (kg)				Total
Rank	Athlete	Group	1	2	3	Rank	1	2	3	Rank	Total
1st place, gold medalist(s)	Cansel Özkan (TUR)	A	85	88	~~90~~	1st place, gold medalist(s)	96	98	100	1st place, gold medalist(s)	188
2nd place, silver medalist(s)	Basilia Bamerop Ninggan (INA)	A	~~75~~	~~75~~	75	2nd place, silver medalist(s)	95	97	99	2nd place, silver medalist(s)	174
3rd place, bronze medalist(s)	Marjia Akter Ekra (BAN)	A	~~70~~	70	72	3rd place, bronze medalist(s)	~~85~~	85	91	3rd place, bronze medalist(s)	163
4	Seljan Garayeva (AZE)	A	67	~~71~~	71	4	88	~~93~~	~~93~~	5	159
5	Jurulena Binti Juna (BRU)	A	~~62~~	62	~~67~~	5	83	89	~~92~~	4	151
6	Yasmin Al-Madfoudh (KSA)	A	54	59	~~62~~	6	67	71	~~75~~	7	130
7	Amal Al-Shareefi (KUW)	A	50	~~53~~	53	8	70	75	~~80~~	6	128
8	Bouchra Saadi (ALG)	A	~~53~~	53	~~58~~	7	65	68	~~72~~	8	121

=== Women's 58 kg ===
Rank	Athlete	Group	Snatch (kg)				Clean & Jerk (kg)				Total
Rank	Athlete	Group	1	2	3	Rank	1	2	3	Rank	Total
1st place, gold medalist(s)	Rafiatu Lawal (NGR)	A	95	~~98~~	98	1st place, gold medalist(s)	117	120	122	1st place, gold medalist(s)	220
2nd place, silver medalist(s)	Nigora Abdullaeva (UZB)	A	90	~~96~~	96	2nd place, silver medalist(s)	110	118	~~121~~	2nd place, silver medalist(s)	214
3rd place, bronze medalist(s)	Noura Essam (EGY)	A	81	83	~~86~~	3rd place, bronze medalist(s)	100	703	106	3rd place, bronze medalist(s)	189
4	Amel Candra Novitasari (INA)	A	75	~~81~~	82	4	95	100	~~102~~	4	182
5	Inas Dris (ALG)	A	~~65~~	67	73	6	83	~~88~~	88	6	161
6	Fatemah Al-Kahawaher (KSA)	A	66	70	~~73~~	8	~~91~~	91	~~97~~	5	161
7	Aidai Kurbanbek Kyzy (KGZ)	A	63	66	68	9	~~85~~	85	~~90~~	7	153
—	Sritey Akter (BAN)	A	74	77	~~80~~	5	~~101~~	~~102~~	~~104~~	—	—
—	Alia Johari (MAS)	A	70	~~72~~	~~72~~	7	~~88~~	~~88~~	~~88~~	—	—

=== Women's 63 kg ===
Rank	Athlete	Group	Snatch (kg)				Clean & Jerk (kg)				Total
Rank	Athlete	Group	1	2	3	Rank	1	2	3	Rank	Total
1st place, gold medalist(s)	Aysel Özkan (TUR)	A	~~90~~	96	98	1st place, gold medalist(s)	116	~~118~~	118	1st place, gold medalist(s)	216
2nd place, silver medalist(s)	Enkileda Carja (ALB)	A	93	~~96~~	97	2nd place, silver medalist(s)	111	~~116~~	116	4	213
3rd place, bronze medalist(s)	Ruth Ayodele (NGR)	A	~~93~~	95	~~98~~	3rd place, bronze medalist(s)	115	117	~~120~~	2nd place, silver medalist(s)	212
4	Nadita Aprilia (INA)	A	90	94	~~96~~	4	~~110~~	~~112~~	117	3rd place, bronze medalist(s)	211
5	Darya Balabayuk (KAZ)	A	~~81~~	81	~~85~~	5	100	~~104~~	104	5	185
6	Yasmine Metawea (EGY)	A	80	~~84~~	~~84~~	6	100	~~106~~	~~106~~	6	180
7	Alexa Marie Mina (LBN)	A	~~79~~	79	~~84~~	7	100	~~103~~	~~104~~	7	179
8	Mai Al-Madani (UAE)	A	74	78	~~80~~	8	88	92	~~94~~	8	170
9	Alanoud Al-Shehri (KSA)	A	70	74	~~76~~	9	85	~~89~~	90	9	164
10	Madeleine Matam (CMR)	A	65	~~70~~	71	10	85	~~90~~	~~91~~	10	156

=== Women's 69 kg ===
Rank	Athlete	Group	Snatch (kg)				Clean & Jerk (kg)				Total
Rank	Athlete	Group	1	2	3	Rank	1	2	3	Rank	Total
1st place, gold medalist(s)	Ingrid Segura (BHR)	A	98	102	106	2nd place, silver medalist(s)	128	~~131~~	—	1st place, gold medalist(s)	234
2nd place, silver medalist(s)	Nuray Güngör (TUR)	A	~~101~~	101	105	3rd place, bronze medalist(s)	125	~~128~~	128	2nd place, silver medalist(s)	233
3rd place, bronze medalist(s)	Reihaneh Karimi (IRI)	A	~~92~~	93	95	6	~~123~~	~~126~~	126	3rd place, bronze medalist(s)	221
4	Shakhnoza Khaydarova (UZB)	A	91	95	~~99~~	5	112	117	~~122~~	5	212
5	Aray Nurlybekova (KAZ)	A	96	~~100~~	~~102~~	4	115	~~121~~	~~122~~	6	211
6	Mabia Aktar (BAN)	A	90	94	~~96~~	7	116	~~121~~	~~121~~	5	210
7	Mahassen Fattouh (LBN)	A	88	91	94	8	108	114	~~120~~	7	208
8	Al-Zahraa Kamshad (KUW)	A	55	60	~~64~~	9	75	~~80~~	~~80~~	9	135
—	Islamiyat Yusuf (NGR)	A	105	107	110	1st place, gold medalist(s)	~~130~~	~~130~~	~~130~~	—	—
—	Jannh Al-Amari (KSA)	A	~~68~~	~~68~~	~~68~~	—	85	90	~~94~~	8	—

=== Women's 77 kg ===
Rank	Athlete	Group	Snatch (kg)				Clean & Jerk (kg)				Total
Rank	Athlete	Group	1	2	3	Rank	1	2	3	Rank	Total
1st place, gold medalist(s)	Sara Ahmed (EGY)	A	109	115	~~117~~	2nd place, silver medalist(s)	135	145	~~150~~	1st place, gold medalist(s)	260
2nd place, silver medalist(s)	Sarah Matthew (NGR)	A	108	114	116	1st place, gold medalist(s)	125	~~129~~	129	2nd place, silver medalist(s)	245
3rd place, bronze medalist(s)	Ayanat Zhumagali (KAZ)	A	93	~~96~~	~~97~~	5	121	124	128	3rd place, bronze medalist(s)	221
4	Sara Yenigün (TUR)	A	~~93~~	93	~~97~~	6	~~120~~	122	~~125~~	4	215
5	Gulshodakhon Dadamirzaeva (UZB)	A	92	96	~~98~~	4	118	~~123~~	~~123~~	5	214
6	Zahra Hosseini (IRI)	A	91	~~94~~	97	3rd place, bronze medalist(s)	116	~~121~~	~~123~~	6	213
7	Fazila Imanova (AZE)	A	~~83~~	~~83~~	84	7	105	—	—	7	189
8	Douaa Bouabdallah (ALG)	A	75	80	~~84~~	8	95	100	~~105~~	8	180
9	Madeleine Ornella Matam (CMR)	A	~~75~~	75	~~78~~	9	~~95~~	95	~~100~~	9	170
10	Hanan Al-Ameer (KUW)	A	63	66	~~69~~	10	~~75~~	75	~~78~~	10	141

=== Women's 86 kg ===
Rank	Athlete	Group	Snatch (kg)				Clean & Jerk (kg)				Total
Rank	Athlete	Group	1	2	3	Rank	1	2	3	Rank	Total
1st place, gold medalist(s)	Rahma Ahmed (EGY)	A	108	112	116	1st place, gold medalist(s)	127	~~132~~	~~132~~	3rd place, bronze medalist(s)	243
2nd place, silver medalist(s)	Rigina Adashbaeva (UZB)	A	103	105	~~109~~	2nd place, silver medalist(s)	130	133	~~135~~	2nd place, silver medalist(s)	238
3rd place, bronze medalist(s)	Mahsa Beheshti (IRI)	A	97	~~104~~	104	3rd place, bronze medalist(s)	125	~~133~~	134	1st place, gold medalist(s)	238
4	Rahila Huseynzade (AZE)	A	92	96	~~99~~	4	111	115	120	4	216
5	Aruzhan Dauletova (KAZ)	A	86	90	~~92~~	5	105	110	~~114~~	6	200
6	Djifack Raissa (CMR)	A	85	~~89~~	~~90~~	6	105	112	~~115~~	5	197
7	Zhamilia Zhenishbek (KGZ)	A	~~68~~	68	70	7	~~88~~	88	~~90~~	7	158
8	Aisha Namataka (UGA)	A	55	60	~~65~~	8	70	75	80	8	140

=== Women's +86 kg ===
Rank	Athlete	Group	Snatch (kg)				Clean & Jerk (kg)				Total
Rank	Athlete	Group	1	2	3	Rank	1	2	3	Rank	Total
1st place, gold medalist(s)	Ouisal Ikhlef (QAT)	A	117	~~121~~	—	1st place, gold medalist(s)	146	151	160	1st place, gold medalist(s)	277
2nd place, silver medalist(s)	Lyubov Kovalchuk (KAZ)	A	110	115	117	2nd place, silver medalist(s)	145	150	~~154~~	2nd place, silver medalist(s)	267
3rd place, bronze medalist(s)	Tursunoy Jabborova (UZB)	A	106	111	116	3rd place, bronze medalist(s)	130	136	138	3rd place, bronze medalist(s)	254
4	Fatma Ahmed (EGY)	A	98	~~103~~	103	5	127	131	137	4	240
5	Sara Safaverdi (IRI)	A	100	~~104~~	105	4	122	~~128~~	~~131~~	7	227
6	Amina Yahia Mamoun (ALG)	A	95	101	~~105~~	6	120	126	~~132~~	5	227
7	Estelle Momeni (CMR)	A	73	80	~~82~~	7	80	~~85~~	~~85~~	8	160
—	Jihan Syafitri (INA)	A	~~95~~	~~95~~	~~95~~	—	120	126	~~132~~	6	—

== Para powerlifting ==
=== Results ===
Men's Heavyweight (Up to 80, 88, 97, 107, Over 107)

GOLD ROSTAMI Roohallah IRI SILVER MOHSIN Rasool IRQ BRONZE JAMILOV Bekzod UZB

Men's Lightweight (Up to 49.0, 54.0, 59.0, 65.0, 72.0)

GOLD ELMENYAWY Mohamed Saad Soliman EGY SILVER RADHI Mustafa IRQ BRONZE KAYAPINAR Abdullah TUR

Women's Heavyweight (67, 73, 79, 86, Over 86)

GOLD OWOLABI-OLUWAFEMIAYO Alice Folashade NGR SILVER TOSHPULATOVA Kudratoy UZB BRONZE ISSA Asma JOR

Women's Lightweight (Up to 41, 45, 50, 55, 61)

GOLD AHMED Rehab Ahmed Radwan Mohamed EGY SILVER EL GARRAA Najat MAR BRONZE DUMAN Besra TUR

Women's Lightweight (Up to 41, 45, 50, 55, 61) - 9

Men's Lightweight (Up to 49.0, 54.0, 59.0, 65.0, 72.0) - 11

Women's Heavyweight (67, 73, 79, 86, Over 86) - 10

Men's Heavyweight (Up to 80, 88, 97, 107, Over 107) - 11

=== Medal table ===
* Host nation (Saudi Arabia)

Rank	Nation	Gold	Silver	Bronze	Total
1	Egypt	2	0	0	2
2	Iran	1	0	0	1
2	Nigeria	1	0	0	1
4	Iraq	0	2	0	2
5	Uzbekistan	0	1	1	2
6	Morocco	0	1	0	1
7	Turkey	0	0	2	2
8	Jordan	0	0	1	1
Totals (8 entries)		4	4	4	12
