= Ouisal Ikhlef =

Algerian-born Qatari weightlifter (born 2003)

Personal information
- Citizenship: Qatar
- Born: 3 September 2003 (age 23) Algeria

Sport
- Sport: Weightlifting
- Weight class: +86 kg
Medal record
Women's weightlifting
Representing Qatar
Asian Games
Bronze medal – third place	2026 Aichi-Nagoya	+86 kg
Asian Championships
Silver medal – second place	2026 Gandhinagar	+86 kg
Islamic Solidarity Games
Gold medal – first place	2025 Riyadh	+86 kg S
Gold medal – first place	2025 Riyadh	+86 kg CJ
Gold medal – first place	2025 Riyadh	+86 kg T

Ouisal Ikhlef (Arabic: وصال يخلف) is an Algerian-born Qatari weightlifter who won bronze at the 2026 Asian Games and gold at the 2025 Islamic Solidarity Games.

== Career ==
Ikhlef was regarded as one of Algeria's promising young weightlifters and was expected to contend for a medal at the 2022 Mediterranean Games, but was unable to compete after her weight class was excluded due to an insufficient number of entries.

After being marginalised in Algeria and prevented from competing at the World Junior Weightlifting Championships, Ikhlef moved to Qatar, where she was later naturalised and began representing the country.

Ikhlef rose to prominence again after securing three gold medals in women's weightlifting at the 2025 Islamic Solidarity Games.

During the 2026 Asian Weightlifting Championships, she won Qatar's first medals in women's weightlifting. Later that year, she won a bronze medal at the 2026 Asian Games, becoming the first Qatari woman to win a medal in weightlifting at the event.

== Major results ==
Year	Venue	Weight	Snatch (kg)				Clean & jerk (kg)				Total	Rank
Year	Venue	Weight	1	2	3	Rank	1	2	3	Rank	Total	Rank
Islamic Solidarity Games
2025	Riyadh, Saudi Arabia	+86 kg	117	~~121~~	—	1st place, gold medalist(s)	146	151	160	1st place, gold medalist(s)	277	1st place, gold medalist(s)
Asian Games
2026	Nagoya, Japan	+86 kg	120	~~129~~	~~131~~	—N/a	153	~~168~~	~~173~~	—N/a	273	3rd place, bronze medalist(s)
Asian Championships
2026	Gandhinagar, India	+86 kg	120	~~129~~	130	3rd place, bronze medalist(s)	151	~~165~~	169	2nd place, silver medalist(s)	299	2nd place, silver medalist(s)
