= Alan Naniyev =

Azerbaijani weightlifter

Personal information
- Full name: Alan Naniyev
- Born: 3 October 1978 (age 47) Severnaya Osetiya-Alaniya Respublika, Russia
- Height: 185 cm (6 ft 1 in)
- Weight: 104.58 kg (230.6 lb)

Sport
- Country: Azerbaijan
- Sport: Weightlifting
- Weight class: 105 kg
- Team: National team
- Updated on 11 September 2016

Alan Naniyev (born 3 October 1978 in Severnaya Osetiya-Alaniya Respublika, Russia) is a Russian born Azerbaijani male weightlifter, competing in the 105 kg category and representing Azerbaijan at international competitions. He participated at the 2004 Summer Olympics in the 105 kg event. He competed at world championships, most recently at the 2006 World Weightlifting Championships.

== Major results ==
Year	Venue	Weight	Snatch (kg)				Clean & Jerk (kg)				Total	Rank
Year	Venue	Weight	1	2	3	Rank	1	2	3	Rank	Total	Rank
Summer Olympics
2004	Athens, Italy	105 kg				—N/a				—N/a		6
World Championships
2006	Santo Domingo, Dominican Republic	105 kg	182	~~186~~	~~186~~	6	210	215	218	5	400.0	5
2005	Doha, Qatar	105 kg	~~187~~	187	~~189~~	4	221	~~223~~	~~224~~	7	408.0	5
2003	Vancouver, Canada	+105 kg	~~180~~	180	---	15	215	---	---	15	395	14
