= 2024 World Weightlifting Championships – Men's 109 kg =

Men's 109 kg at the 2024 World Weightlifting Championships
- Venue: Weightlifting Marquee Venue
- Location: Manama, Bahrain
- Dates: 13 December (Group C); 14 December (Group A and B)
- Competitors: 28 from 22 nations
- Winning total: 424 kg

Medalists
gold medal	Ruslan Nurudinov	Uzbekistan
silver medal	Dadash Dadashbayli	Azerbaijan
bronze medal	Mehdi Karami	Iran

The men's 109 kilograms competition at the 2024 World Weightlifting Championships was held on 13 and 14 December 2024.

== Schedule ==
Date	Time	Event
13 December 2024	10:00	Group C
14 December 2024	13:00	Group B
14 December 2024	17:30	Group A

== Records ==
Prior to this competition, the existing world records were as follows.

World Record	Snatch	Yang Zhe (CHN)	200 kg	Tashkent, Uzbekistan	24 April 2021
World Record	Clean & Jerk	Ruslan Nurudinov (UZB)	241 kg	Tashkent, Uzbekistan	24 April 2021
World Record	Total	Simon Martirosyan (ARM)	435 kg	Ashgabat, Turkmenistan	9 November 2018

== Results ==
Rank	Athlete	Group	Snatch (kg)				Clean & Jerk (kg)				Total
Rank	Athlete	Group	1	2	3	Rank	1	2	3	Rank	Total
1st place, gold medalist(s)	Ruslan Nurudinov (UZB)	A	182	~~187~~	~~187~~	5	223	230	242 CWR	1st place, gold medalist(s)	424
2nd place, silver medalist(s)	Dadash Dadashbayli (AZE)	A	~~178~~	~~182~~	183	4	216	221	—	2nd place, silver medalist(s)	404
3rd place, bronze medalist(s)	Mehdi Karami (IRI)	A	175	~~182~~	183	3rd place, bronze medalist(s)	~~210~~	210	217	4	400
4	Salwan Al-Aifuri (IRQ)	B	171	~~176~~	176	6	211	~~220~~	220	3rd place, bronze medalist(s)	396
5	Sharofiddin Amriddinov (UZB)	A	177	181	184	1st place, gold medalist(s)	207	212	~~216~~	7	396
6	Siarhei Sharankou (AIN)	A	170	~~175~~	175	8	210	215	~~221~~	5	390
7	Zaza Lomtadze (GEO)	B	165	169	~~171~~	14	205	210	214	6	383
8	Kolbi Ferguson (USA)	B	170	~~175~~	~~178~~	11	~~211~~	211	~~224~~	8	381
9	Ariya Paydar (IRI)	A	~~171~~	~~171~~	171	10	~~205~~	~~205~~	207	10	378
10	Dong Bing-cheng (TPE)	A	166	~~170~~	170	12	206	~~210~~	~~210~~	11	376
11	Li Wenlong (CHN)	B	165	170	175	7	200	~~205~~	~~205~~	15	375
12	Hernán Viera (PER)	B	155	~~160~~	160	21	~~210~~	210	~~216~~	9	370
13	Karim Saadi (MEX)	C	157	162	166	16	194	200	203	13	369
14	Ali Al-Khazal (KSA)	C	164	169	~~172~~	13	190	199	~~205~~	17	368
15	Alejandro Medina (USA)	C	166	172	~~178~~	9	~~194~~	195	~~200~~	18	367
16	Taniela Rainibogi (FIJ)	B	163	~~168~~	~~173~~	18	~~200~~	200	~~205~~	16	363
17	Longinoz Bregvadze (GEO)	C	164	168	~~173~~	15	~~193~~	~~193~~	194	20	362
18	Petros Petrosyan (ARM)	B	155	~~162~~	~~162~~	22	~~205~~	~~205~~	205	12	360
19	Seo Hui-yeop (KOR)	C	~~163~~	163	~~167~~	17	194	~~200~~	~~200~~	19	357
20	Sultan Meiram (KAZ)	C	152	157	161	19	193	~~201~~	~~201~~	21	354
21	Junior Ngadja Nyabeyeu (CMR)	C	152	~~156~~	~~157~~	24	193	200	~~205~~	14	352
22	Arnas Šidiškis (LTU)	C	145	~~151~~	153	23	180	185	~~189~~	22	338
23	Arnošt Vogel (CZE)	C	~~142~~	143	146	25	178	183	~~186~~	23	329
—	Garik Karapetyan (ARM)	A	183	~~188~~	~~188~~	2nd place, silver medalist(s)	—	—	—	—	—
—	Mohammed Hamada (PLE)	C	155	160	~~165~~	20	~~185~~	~~185~~	~~185~~	—	—
—	Dino Đale (CRO)	C	~~140~~	~~140~~	~~142~~	—	160	~~165~~	~~165~~	24	—
—	Andas Samarkanov (KAZ)	A	~~174~~	—	—	—	—	—	—	—	—
—	Artūrs Plēsnieks (LAT)	B	~~165~~	~~165~~	~~165~~	—	—	—	—	—	—
—	Ezzeddin Al-Ghafeer (UAE)	B	Did not start								
—	Vasil Marinov (BUL)	B	Did not start								
—	Karolis Andrijauskas (LTU)	C	Did not start								
