= 2005 World Weightlifting Championships – Men's 105 kg =

The 2005 World Weightlifting Championships were held in Doha, Qatar from 9 November to 17 November. The men's 105 kilograms division was staged on 16 November 2005.

== Schedule ==
Date	Time	Event
16 November 2005	13:00	Group B
16 November 2005	15:00	Group A

== Medalists ==
Event	Gold		Silver		Bronze	
Snatch	Dmitry Klokov (RUS)	192 kg	Alexandru Bratan (MDA)	190 kg	Martin Tešovič (SVK)	187 kg
Clean & Jerk	Dmitry Klokov (RUS)	227 kg	Ramūnas Vyšniauskas (LTU)	225 kg	Martin Tešovič (SVK)	225 kg
Total	Dmitry Klokov (RUS)	419 kg	Alexandru Bratan (MDA)	413 kg	Martin Tešovič (SVK)	412 kg

== Records ==
Prior to this competition, the existing world records were as follows.

World Record	Snatch	Marcin Dołęga (POL)	198 kg	Havířov, Czech Republic	4 June 2002
World Record	Clean & Jerk	World Standard	242 kg	—	1 January 1998
World Record	Total	World Standard	440 kg	—	1 January 1998

== Results ==
Rank	Athlete	Group	Body weight	Snatch (kg)				Clean & Jerk (kg)				Total
Rank	Athlete	Group	Body weight	1	2	3	Rank	1	2	3	Rank	Total
1st place, gold medalist(s)	Dmitry Klokov (RUS)	A	104.67	186	190	192	1st place, gold medalist(s)	222	227	—	1st place, gold medalist(s)	419
2nd place, silver medalist(s)	Alexandru Bratan (MDA)	A	104.06	185	~~190~~	190	2nd place, silver medalist(s)	220	223	~~229~~	4	413
3rd place, bronze medalist(s)	Martin Tešovič (SVK)	A	104.33	~~183~~	183	187	3rd place, bronze medalist(s)	~~220~~	221	225	3rd place, bronze medalist(s)	412
4	Dmitry Lapikov (RUS)	A	104.08	~~185~~	185	~~190~~	5	~~217~~	217	223	5	408
5	Alan Naniyev (AZE)	A	104.66	~~187~~	187	~~189~~	4	221	~~223~~	~~224~~	7	408
6	Robert Dołęga (POL)	A	104.46	179	182	~~184~~	7	218	221	~~227~~	6	403
7	Ibrahim Moursi (EGY)	A	103.98	178	~~182~~	182	6	210	215	218	8	400
8	Andre Rohde (GER)	A	104.04	176	180	~~183~~	8	210	218	~~222~~	9	398
9	Ammar Yosr (IRQ)	B	103.69	170	~~176~~	178	9	200	~~205~~	206	10	384
10	Peter Kelley (USA)	B	103.88	158	163	~~168~~	11	~~200~~	200	~~206~~	11	363
11	Akos Sandor (CAN)	B	104.96	~~155~~	155	160	12	~~190~~	~~190~~	190	14	350
12	Konstantinos Gkaripis (GRE)	B	103.72	152	~~157~~	~~157~~	14	193	197	~~200~~	12	349
13	Héctor Pineda (VEN)	B	104.47	153	~~158~~	~~158~~	13	~~192~~	192	195	13	348
14	Soichi Kadowaki (JPN)	B	104.63	145	150	~~157~~	15	178	~~183~~	~~183~~	15	328
—	Isa Bala (ALB)	B	102.73	168	175	~~180~~	10	~~202~~	~~202~~	~~202~~	—	—
—	Ramūnas Vyšniauskas (LTU)	A	102.90	~~185~~	~~185~~	~~185~~	—	225	~~228~~	~~229~~	2nd place, silver medalist(s)	—
DQ	Said Saif Asaad (QAT)	A	104.49	180	185	~~188~~	—	~~215~~	~~215~~	—	—	—
