= Islamiyat Yusuf =

Nigerian weightlifter (born 2003)

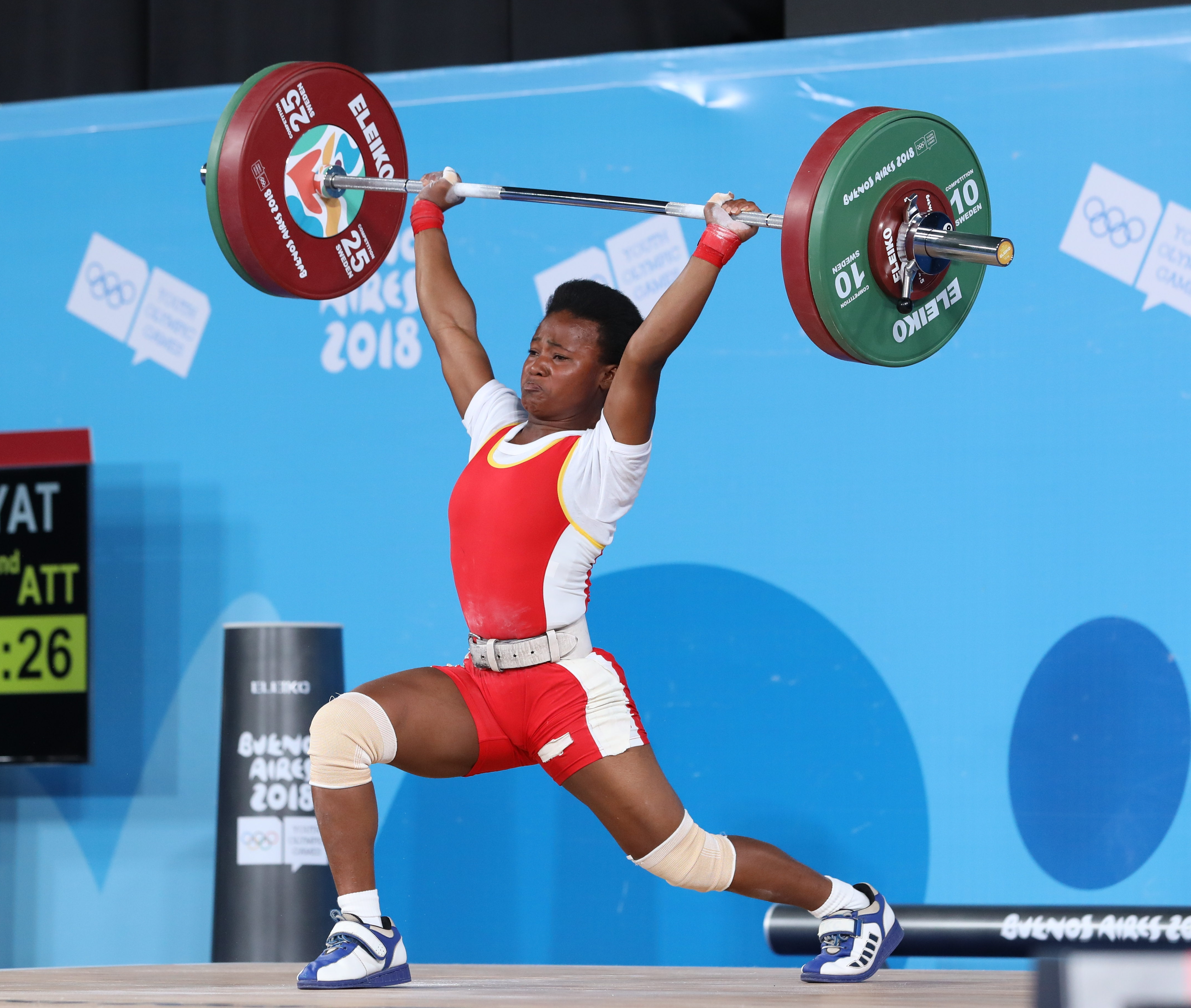
- Yusuf at 2018 Summer Youth Olympics

Medal record

Women's weightlifting

Representing Nigeria

Commonwealth Games
Bronze medal – third place	2022 Birmingham	64 kg

Islamiyat Adebukola Yusuf (born 3 March 2003) is a Nigerian weightlifter. She represents Nigeria at international competitions and has won medals at the Commonwealth Games, the Islamic Solidarity Games, and the Commonwealth Weightlifting Championships. She has evolved from competing in the youth 63 kg category to the senior 69 kg category.

== Early life and education ==
Yusuf was born in Osun State, Nigeria, where she began her weightlifting journey around 2014. She pursued higher education alongside her athletic career, graduating with a Bachelor of Science in Physical and Health Education from Lagos State University (LASU) in 2023.

== Career ==
=== Youth and Junior Career ===
Yusuf first gained international prominence at the youth level. She represented Nigeria at the 2018 Summer Youth Olympics in Buenos Aires, Argentina, where she competed in the girls' middleweight (63 kg) event. She placed fourth overall with a combined total of 173 kg.

=== Senior Career (2022–Present) ===
Competing as a senior in the women's 64 kg category at the 2022 Commonwealth Games in Birmingham, England, Yusuf achieved her first major senior international podium finish. She won the bronze medal by lifting 93 kg in the snatch and 119 kg in the clean and jerk for a combined total of 212 kg, securing Nigeria's fourth medal of the Games.

In 2025, Yusuf strategically moved up to the 69 kg weight class, achieving significant success on the international stage. At the 2025 Commonwealth Weightlifting Championships held in Ahmedabad, India, she won the gold medal with a snatch of 105 kg and a clean and jerk of 131 kg, giving her a winning total of 236 kg.

Later that same year, she competed at the 6th Islamic Solidarity Games in Riyadh, Saudi Arabia. Yusuf won gold in the women's 69 kg snatch event, with her successful lift of 110 kg establishing a new African record.
