= Chinenye Fidelis =

Nigerian weightlifter

Chinenye Silver Fidelis
Personal information
- Nationality: Nigerian
- Born: 28 October 1993 (age 32)

Sport
- Country: Nigeria
- Sport: Weightlifting
- Event: +53 kg
Medal record
Representing Nigeria
Women's weightlifting
African Championships
Gold medal – first place	2008 Addis Ababa	48 kg
Gold medal – first place	2012 Porto Novo	53 kg
Gold medal – first place	2016 Yaoundé	58 kg

Chinenye Fidelis (born 28 October 1993) is a Nigerian weightlifter. She represents Nigeria both nationally and internationally. She has competed in the Nigerian National Sports Festival, African Weightlifting Championships and World Weightlifting Championships.

== Achievements ==
Fidelis in 2008 represented Nigeria at the 19th MEN and 8th women African championships where she was ranked 1st in the 48 kg event. In 2011, she competed in the World weightlifting Championship where she ranked 13th in the 53 kg event.

She competed at the 2012 African Weightlifting Championships where she set a new African record and won a gold medal in the + 53 kg event.

At the 17th National Sports Festival in Port Harcourt, Nigeria, she broke the national record in the 53 kg snatch event. Fidelis lifted a total of 85 kg to beat the old record of 82.5 kg set by Patience Lawal in the 2006 edition of the Games. Fidelis also set a new record for Africa in the clean and Jerk event. She lifted a weight of 120 kg beating the old record of 112 kg also by Patience Lawal.

She represented Nigeria at the 2016 African Weightlifting Championships held in Yaoundé ranking first in clean and jerk and snatch events. During the African Championships – Continental Olympic Qualification Event in Nairobi, Kenya, Fidelis broke four continental records on the first day by lifting 87kgs, and ended with a total of 202kgs being both junior and senior african records.
