= List of Malagasy records in Olympic weightlifting =

The following are the national records in Olympic weightlifting in Madagascar. Records are maintained in each weight class for the snatch lift, clean and jerk lift, and the total for both lifts by the Malagasy Weightlifting Federation.

== Current records ==
=== Men ===
Event	Record	Athlete	Date	Meet	Place	Ref
55 kg
Snatch	110 kg	Jean Ramiarimanana	5 September 2023	World Championships	Riyadh, Saudi Arabia	
Clean & Jerk	135 kg	Elariont Ramiarimanana	26 August 2023	Indian Ocean Island Games	Antananarivo, Madagascar	
Total	240 kg	Jean Ramiarimanana	5 September 2023	World Championships	Riyadh, Saudi Arabia	
61 kg
Snatch	115 kg	Eric Andriantsitohaina	26 August 2019	African Games	Rabat, Morocco	
Clean & Jerk	150 kg	Eric Andriantsitohaina	26 August 2019	African Games	Rabat, Morocco	
Total	265 kg	Eric Andriantsitohaina	26 August 2019	African Games	Rabat, Morocco	
67 kg
Snatch	137 kg	Tojonirina Andriantsitohaina	27 May 2021	African Championships	Nairobi, Kenya	
Clean & Jerk	167 kg	Tojonirina Andriantsitohaina	April 2019	African Championships	Cairo, Egypt	
Total	303 kg	Tojonirina Andriatsitohaina	27 May 2021	African Championships	Nairobi, Kenya	
73 kg
Snatch	153 kg	Tojonirina Andriantsitohaina	8 September 2023	World Championships	Riyadh, Saudi Arabia	
Clean & Jerk	183 kg	Tojonirina Andriantsitohaina	27 August 2023	Indian Ocean Island Games	Antananarivo, Madagascar	
Total	333 kg	Tojonirina Andriantsitohaina	27 August 2023	Indian Ocean Island Games	Antananarivo, Madagascar	
81 kg
Snatch	133 kg	Maminiaina Ranaivoson	28 August 2023	Indian Ocean Island Games	Antananarivo, Madagascar	
Clean & Jerk	165 kg	Ravo Fanomezantsoa	28 August 2023	Indian Ocean Island Games	Antananarivo, Madagascar	
Total	291 kg	Ravo Fanomezantsoa	28 August 2023	Indian Ocean Island Games	Antananarivo, Madagascar	
89 kg
Snatch	126 kg	Fanambina Randrianjatovo	28 August 2023	Indian Ocean Island Games	Antananarivo, Madagascar	
Clean & Jerk	163 kg	Fanambina Randrianjatovo	28 August 2023	Indian Ocean Island Games	Antananarivo, Madagascar	
Total	289 kg	Fanambina Randrianjatovo	28 August 2023	Indian Ocean Island Games	Antananarivo, Madagascar	
96 kg
Snatch	118 kg	Fanantenana Randrianavalona	28 August 2023	Indian Ocean Island Games	Antananarivo, Madagascar	
Clean & Jerk	160 kg	Fanantenana Randrianavalona	28 August 2023	Indian Ocean Island Games	Antananarivo, Madagascar	
Total	278 kg	Fanantenana Randrianavalona	28 August 2023	Indian Ocean Island Games	Antananarivo, Madagascar	
102 kg
Snatch	115 kg	Mamintsoa Hery Ny Aina	28 August 2023	Indian Ocean Island Games	Antananarivo, Madagascar	
Clean & Jerk	165 kg	Mamintsoa Hery Ny Aina	28 August 2023	Indian Ocean Island Games	Antananarivo, Madagascar	
Total	280 kg	Mamintsoa Hery Ny Aina	28 August 2023	Indian Ocean Island Games	Antananarivo, Madagascar	
109 kg
Snatch						
Clean & Jerk						
Total						
+109 kg
Snatch						
Clean & Jerk						
Total						

=== Women ===
Event	Record	Athlete	Date	Meet	Place	Ref
45 kg
Snatch	77 kg	Rosina Randafiarison	4 September 2023	World Championships	Riyadh, Saudi Arabia	
Clean & Jerk	93 kg	Rosina Randafiarison	4 September 2023	World Championships	Riyadh, Saudi Arabia	
Total	170 kg	Rosina Randafiarison	4 September 2023	World Championships	Riyadh, Saudi Arabia	
49 kg
Snatch	80 kg	Rosina Randafiarison	7 August 2024	Olympic Games	Paris, France	
Clean & Jerk	100 kg	Rosina Randafiarison	7 August 2024	Olympic Games	Paris, France	
Total	180 kg	Rosina Randafiarison	7 August 2024	Olympic Games	Paris, France	
55 kg
Snatch	80 kg	Sarikaniaina Bakoliharisoa	5 September 2023	World Championships	Riyadh, Saudi Arabia	
Clean & Jerk	105 kg	Sarikaniaina Bakoliharisoa	27 August 2023	Indian Ocean Island Games	Antananarivo, Madagascar	
Total	180 kg	Sarikaniaina Bakoliharisoa	27 August 2023	Indian Ocean Island Games	Antananarivo, Madagascar	
59 kg
Snatch	75 kg	Angeline Rakotoharisoa	27 August 2023	Indian Ocean Island Games	Antananarivo, Madagascar	
Clean & Jerk	100 kg	Angeline Rakotoharisoa	27 August 2023	Indian Ocean Island Games	Antananarivo, Madagascar	
Total	175 kg	Angeline Rakotoharisoa	27 August 2023	Indian Ocean Island Games	Antananarivo, Madagascar	
64 kg
Snatch	85 kg	Elisa Ravololoniaina	27 August 2023	Indian Ocean Island Games	Antananarivo, Madagascar	
Clean & Jerk	96 kg	Elisa Ravololoniaina	27 August 2023	Indian Ocean Island Games	Antananarivo, Madagascar	
Total	181 kg	Elisa Ravololoniaina	27 August 2023	Indian Ocean Island Games	Antananarivo, Madagascar	
71 kg
Snatch	63 kg	Angeline Rakotoharisoa	12 March 2024	African Games	Accra, Ghana	
Clean & Jerk						
Total						
76 kg
Snatch	80 kg	Harisoa Razafy	28 August 2023	Indian Ocean Island Games	Antananarivo, Madagascar	
Clean & Jerk	105 kg	Harisoa Razafy	28 August 2023	Indian Ocean Island Games	Antananarivo, Madagascar	
Total	185 kg	Harisoa Razafy	28 August 2023	Indian Ocean Island Games	Antananarivo, Madagascar	
81 kg
Snatch	81 kg	Axelle Soananahary	28 August 2023	Indian Ocean Island Games	Antananarivo, Madagascar	
Clean & Jerk	93 kg	Axelle Soananahary	28 August 2023	Indian Ocean Island Games	Antananarivo, Madagascar	
Total	174 kg	Axelle Soananahary	28 August 2023	Indian Ocean Island Games	Antananarivo, Madagascar	
87 kg
Snatch						
Clean & Jerk						
Total						
+87 kg
Snatch	77 kg	Raima Miadantsoa	28 August 2023	Indian Ocean Island Games	Antananarivo, Madagascar	
Clean & Jerk	91 kg	Raima Miadantsoa	28 August 2023	Indian Ocean Island Games	Antananarivo, Madagascar	
Total	158 kg	Raima Miadantsoa	28 August 2023	Indian Ocean Island Games	Antananarivo, Madagascar	

== Historical records ==
=== Men (1998–2018) ===
Event	Record	Athlete	Date	Meet	Place	Ref
56 kg
Snatch	101 kg	Eric Andriantsitohaina	13 July 2017	African Championships	Vacoas, Mauritius	
Clean and jerk	133 kg	Eric Andriantsitohaina	13 July 2017	African Championships	Vacoas, Mauritius	
Total	234 kg	Eric Andriantsitohaina	13 July 2017	African Championships	Vacoas, Mauritius	
62 kg
Snatch	122 kg	Tojonirina Andriantsitohaina	13 July 2017	African Championships	Vacoas, Mauritius	
Clean & Jerk						
Total	272 kg	Tojonirina Andriantsitohaina	13 July 2017	African Championships	Vacoas, Mauritius	
69 kg
Snatch						
Clean & Jerk						
Total						
77 kg
Snatch						
Clean and jerk						
Total						
85 kg
Snatch						
Clean and jerk						
Total						
94 kg
Snatch						
Clean and jerk						
Total						
105 kg
Snatch						
Clean and jerk						
Total						
+105 kg
Snatch						
Clean and jerk						
Total						
