= 2023 Indian Ocean Island Games =

International sports competition

- Host: Madagascar
- Nations: 7
- Opening: 23 August 2023
- Closing: 3 September 2023
- Website: https://jioi2023.org/

The 2023 Indian Ocean Island Games was the 11th edition of this multi-sport event for athletes representing the National Olympic Committees of Indian Ocean island nations, in Madagascar. The total cost of the organization was 34 billion ariary. The original hosts were the Maldives, but they withdrew from hosting in January 2021 and were replaced by Madagascar.

== Participating NOCs ==
Over 2,000 athletes from seven countries and territories participated in the 2023 Indian Ocean Island Games.

Participating International
Olympic Committees
- Comoros
- Madagascar (host)
- Maldives
- Mauritius
- Mayotte
- Réunion
- Seychelles

== Sports ==
A total of 17 sports will be represented at the 2023 Indian Ocean Island Games.

- Athletics (45)
- Badminton (7)
- Basketball (4)
- Boxing (13)
- Road cycling (6)
- Handball (2)
- Judo (16)
- Karate (16)
- Kickboxing (14)
- Para athletics (16)
- Para swimming (6)
- Pétanque (9)
- Rugby sevens (2)
- Swimming (40)
- Table tennis (7)
- Taekwondo (24)
- Tennis (5)
- Volleyball (2)
- Weightlifting (60)
- Wrestling (21)

== Medal table ==
* Host nation (Madagascar)

Rank	Nation	Gold	Silver	Bronze	Total
1	Madagascar (MAD)*	121	71	80	272
2	Mauritius (MRI)	91	89	103	283
3	Réunion (REU)	80	90	74	244
4	Seychelles (SEY)	11	33	40	84
5	Comoros (COM)	5	10	16	31
6	Maldives (MDV)	5	9	14	28
7	Mayotte (MYT)	3	11	24	38
Totals (7 entries)		316	313	351	980

== Medalists ==
=== Athletics ===
Men

Event	Gold	Silver	Bronze
100 m	Noa Bibi; Mauritius	Jonathan Bardottier; Mauritius	Orphée Topize; Mauritius
200 m	Noa Bibi; Mauritius	Hajatiana Randrianasolo; Réunion	Jonathan Bardottier; Mauritius
400 m	Jérémie Cotte; Mauritius	Vavara Aina Cléot; Madagascar	Yash Aubeeluck; Mauritius
800 m	Kilian Daude; Réunion	Soazara Randrianantenaina; Madagascar	Freddy Razafimanana; Madagascar
1500 m	Tsima Tahinjanahary; Madagascar	Heriniaina Rakotondrainy; Madagascar	Mohammad Ilshad Dookun; Mauritius
5000 m	Iven Moise; Seychelles	Clément Ranahavitasoa; Madagascar	Tsima Tahinjanahary; Madagascar
10000 m	Iven Moise; Seychelles	Patrick Ralaiarimanana; Madagascar	Clément Ranahavitasoa; Madagascar
110 m hurdles	Raphaël Mohamed; Mayotte	Pascal Désiré; Mauritius	Victor Zelasy; Madagascar
400 m hurdles	Soyifidine Saïd; Mayotte	Pascal Désiré; Mauritius	Jean-Robert Bezara; Madagascar
4 × 100 m relay	Mauritius; Orphée Topize; Jonathan Bardottier; Noa Bibi; Joshan Vencatasamy	Mayotte; Kamel Zoubert; Djassim Ahamada; Soyifidine Saïd; Raphaël Mohamed	Réunion; Samuel Libelle; Cédric Lacouture; Hajatiana Randrianasolo; Yann Randrianasolo
4 × 400 m relay	Madagascar; Vavara Aina Cléot; Lorin Razanandrafomba; Todisoa Rabearison; Patrice Remandro	Mayotte; Soyifidine Saïd; Hazir Inoussa Ali M'Dahoma; Djassim Ahamada; Raphaël Mohamed	Réunion; Ruben Gado; Cyrille Rasoamanana; Kilian Daude; Cédric Lacouture
10 km walk	Jérôme Caprice; Mauritius	Théophile Ramaroson; Madagascar	Kushar Gukhool; Mauritius
Half marathon	Miftahou Mohamed; Comoros	Fulgence Rakotondrasoa; Madagascar	Mampitroatsy; Madagascar
High jump	Dezardin Prosper; Mauritius	Joshua Onezime; Seychelles	Norris Brioche; Seychelles
Pole vault	Ruben Gado; Réunion	Alexis Quest; Réunion	Noah Hullen; Réunion
Long jump	Yann Randrianasolo; Réunion	Narindra Rafidimalala; Madagascar	Djassim Ahamada; Mayotte
Triple jump	Patrick Gentil; Mauritius	Yann Randrianasolo; Réunion	Heritiana Andrilova; Madagascar
Shot put	Henry-Bernard Baptiste; Mauritius	Joseph Stenio Noel; Mauritius	Nicaise Jeannet; Réunion
Discus throw	Christopher Sophie; Mauritius	Soilihi Boina; Réunion	Nicaise Jeannet; Réunion
Hammer throw	Jean-Ian Carré; Mauritius	Nicholas Li Yung Fong; Mauritius	Lolloharowa Mahendrasingh; Mauritius
Javelin throw	Ali Hamidou Soultoini; Mayotte	Patrick Boullé; Mauritius	Donna Rakotoniaina; Madagascar
Decathlon	Donna Rakotoniaina; Madagascar	Théo Marie-Vlody; Réunion	Blanc Mandaly; Madagascar

Women

Event	Gold	Silver	Bronze
100 m	Claudine Nomenjanahary; Madagascar	Nasrane Bacar; Mayotte	Marie Océanne Moirt; Mauritius
200 m	Claudine Nomenjanahary; Madagascar	Marie Océanne Moirt; Mauritius	Amélie Anthony; Mauritius
400 m	Cynthia Namahako Georges; Madagascar	Koloina Raherinaivo; Madagascar	Ny Aina Andrianjafy; Madagascar
800 m	Marthe Ralisinirina; Madagascar	Eugénie Saholy; Madagascar	Emma Métro; Réunion
1500 m	Emma Métro; Réunion	Marthe Ralisinirina; Madagascar	Justine Chagnaud; Réunion
5000 m	Marie Paule Perrier; Mauritius	Emma Métro; Réunion	Katie Ann-Sue Mauthoor; Mauritius
10000 m	Marie Paule Perrier; Mauritius	Katie Ann-Sue Mauthoor; Mauritius	Justine Chagnaud; Réunion
100 m hurdles	Sidonie Fiadanantsoa; Madagascar	Esther Turpin; Réunion	Estella Ravololonihanta; Madagascar
400 m hurdles	Cynthia Namahako Georges; Madagascar	Léa Mithra; Réunion	Djedidia Haurelia; Madagascar
4 × 100 m relay	Madagascar; Sidonie Fiadanantsoa; Brigitte Razanajafy; Claudine Nomenjanahary; Zo Rakotonary	Mauritius; Océanne Marie Moirt; Marie Laurence Moutia; Amélie Anthony; Doriana Leopold	Maldives; Mariyam Alhaa Hussain; Mariyam Ru'ya Ali; Ahnaa Nizaar; Aishath Himna Hassan
4 × 400 m relay	Madagascar; Koloina Raherinaivo; Ny Aina Andrianjafy; Sidonie Fiadanantsoa; Cynthia Namahako Georges	Mauritius; Angelique Abberley; Ananxya Lebrasse; Marie Clareth L'Etourdie; Amélie Anthony	Maldives; Aminath Layaana Mohamed; Aishath Himna Hassan; Hawwa Muzna Faiz; Ziva Moosa Shafeeu
5 km walk	Prisca Manikion; Mauritius	Nivonirina Ramiharimirija; Madagascar	Dominique Gomez; Réunion
Half marathon	Garance Blaut; Réunion	Isabelle Lamy; Réunion	Marie Paule Perrier; Mauritius
High jump	Esther Turpin; Réunion	Marie-Lucie Vu Van Quiet; Réunion	Emma Mounir; Réunion
Pole vault	Julia Boslak; Réunion	Moana Peyrard; Réunion	Eva Sephora Onno; Mauritius
Long jump	Florentine Razanamandroso; Madagascar	Esther Turpin; Réunion	Liliane Potiron; Mauritius
Triple jump	Liliane Potiron; Mauritius	Marie-Anaëlle Nigathe; Mauritius	A. Rapitsaravolazandry; Madagascar
Shot put	Gabrielle-Marie Basin; Réunion	Estelle Louis; Mauritius	Pestine Zia; Madagascar
Discus throw	Carine Mérion; Réunion	Marie Ingrid Germain; Mauritius	Aninya Ravina; Mauritius
Hammer throw	Juliane Clair; Mauritius	Marie Franciana Guillaume; Mauritius	Anaïs Bigot; Réunion
Javelin throw	Selma Rosun; Mauritius	Vanessa Collin; Mauritius	Pestine Zia; Madagascar
Heptathlon	Tsha Trapu; Mauritius	Claire Joseph; Mauritius	Marie-Lucie Vu Van Quiet; Réunion

Mixed

Event	Gold	Silver	Bronze
4 × 400 m relay	Madagascar; Koloina Raherinaivo; Todisoa Rabearison; Cynthia Namahako Georges; Patrice Remandro	Réunion; Alyssa Hamilcaro; Cédric Lacouture; Esther Turpin; Kenzo Valliamé	Maldives; Aishath Himna Hassan; Hussain Riza; Ziva Moosa Shafeeu; Hassan Saaid

=== Badminton ===
Event	Gold	Silver	Bronze
Men's singles	Alexandre Bongout; Mauritius	Julien Paul; Mauritius	Laval Mathéo Douce; Mauritius
Men's singles	Alexandre Bongout; Mauritius	Julien Paul; Mauritius	Ahmed Nibal; Maldives
Women's singles	Kate Ludik; Mauritius	Fathimath Nabaaha Razzaq; Maldives	Aminath Nabeeha Razzaq; Maldives
Women's singles	Kate Ludik; Mauritius	Fathimath Nabaaha Razzaq; Maldives	Lorna Bodha; Mauritius
Men's doubles	Réunion; Aaron Assing; Xavier Chane Fung Ting	Mauritius; Melvin Appiah; Tejraj Pultoo	Madagascar; Julio Randriamalala; Lalaina Ramanana
Men's doubles	Réunion; Aaron Assing; Xavier Chane Fung Ting	Mauritius; Melvin Appiah; Tejraj Pultoo	Réunion; Loïc Nanicaoudin; Thibauld Cougouille
Women's doubles	Maldives; Fathimath Nabaaha Razzaq; Aminath Nabeeha Razzaq	Mauritius; Kobita Dookhee; Lorna Bodha	Mauritius; Tiya Bhurtun; Vilina Appiah
Women's doubles	Maldives; Fathimath Nabaaha Razzaq; Aminath Nabeeha Razzaq	Mauritius; Kobita Dookhee; Lorna Bodha	Réunion; Ly-Hoa Chai; Marina Bielle
Mixed doubles	Mauritius; Julien Paul; Kate Ludik	Mauritius; Melvin Appiah; Vilina Appiah	Maldives; Fathimath Nabaaha Razzaq; Hussein Zayan Zaki
Mixed doubles	Mauritius; Julien Paul; Kate Ludik	Mauritius; Melvin Appiah; Vilina Appiah	Réunion; Ly-Hoa Chai; Xavier Chane Fung Ting
Men's team	Mauritius; Aidan Yu Siow Yin Young; Alexandre Bongout; Bhavesh Bissessur; Julien Paul; Laval Mathéo Douce; Melvin Appiah; Moynul Munna; Khemtish Rai Nundah; Tejraj Pultoo; Yogeshwarsingh Mahadnac	Maldives; Ahmed Thoif Mohamed; Hussein Zayan Zaki; Jang Kee Young; Mohamed Ajfan Rasheed; Saalim Abdul Samad; Murushida Mannan; Ahmed Nibal; Rishwan Shiyam; Hassan Zayan	Réunion; Aaron Assing; Didier Nourry; Grégory Grondin; Guillaume Gonthier; Hugo Constans; Jean-Fabrice Bilon; Loïc Bertil; Loïc Nanicaoudin; Thibauld Cougouille; Xavier Chane Fung Ting
Men's team	Mauritius; Aidan Yu Siow Yin Young; Alexandre Bongout; Bhavesh Bissessur; Julien Paul; Laval Mathéo Douce; Melvin Appiah; Moynul Munna; Khemtish Rai Nundah; Tejraj Pultoo; Yogeshwarsingh Mahadnac	Maldives; Ahmed Thoif Mohamed; Hussein Zayan Zaki; Jang Kee Young; Mohamed Ajfan Rasheed; Saalim Abdul Samad; Murushida Mannan; Ahmed Nibal; Rishwan Shiyam; Hassan Zayan	Madagascar; Tokinirina Razafimandimby; Ludovic Manja Ny Riana; Julio Randriamalala; Marc Haja Vonjinirina; Tianarivo Razafimahatratra; Lalaina Ramanana
Women's team	Mauritius; Godavri Ancharaz; Kate Ludik; Kobita Dookhee; Layna Luxmi Chiniah; Lorna Bodha; Bhuruth Reva Aditi; Tiya Bhurtun; Vilina Appiah	Maldives; Aminath Nabeeha Razzaq; Maisa Fathuhulla Ismail; Shuba Shareef; Aminath Moosa; Aishath Afnaan Rasheed; Fathimath Nabaaha Razzaq	Réunion; Emily Grondin; Emmanuelle Admette; Estelle Leperlier; Ly-Hoa Chai; Marina Bielle; Virginie Testan
Women's team	Mauritius; Godavri Ancharaz; Kate Ludik; Kobita Dookhee; Layna Luxmi Chiniah; Lorna Bodha; Bhuruth Reva Aditi; Tiya Bhurtun; Vilina Appiah	Maldives; Aminath Nabeeha Razzaq; Maisa Fathuhulla Ismail; Shuba Shareef; Aminath Moosa; Aishath Afnaan Rasheed; Fathimath Nabaaha Razzaq	Madagascar; Soaniaina Razanamaly; Mamisoa Razafimamonjiarison; Fenitra Arijesa; Asminah Razafiarimalala; Fitiana Razafinimanana; Ialicia Rasolonoelina

=== Basketball ===
Event	Gold	Silver	Bronze
Men 5×5	Madagascar; Alpha Solondrainy; Constant Mamdimbison; Elly Randriamampionona; Fiary Rakotonirina; Jerry Rabibisoa; Livio Ratianarivo; Marco Rakotovao; Monja Faralahy; Orlando Rahajaniaina; Rija Lahontan	Réunion; Christophe Palmas; Damien Gara; Fabien Derogy; Florent Champagnac; Johan Padre; Kevin Gastrin; Loïc Lauratet; Mickael Var; Mory Kone; Octavio Da Silveira; Ronald Mauline; Vincent Pota	Mayotte; Ahamadi Hamza; Anli-Said Souffou; Antony Albarede; Austin Rasolonjatovo; Cheddly Abdallah Omar; Djeinad Bamana; Idriss Malide; Lel Soidik Houmadi; Nadjim Badiroiti; Rifki Said; Samir Akilaby; Soilihi Antoy
Women 5×5	Madagascar; Miora Mampionona; Perle Raoliarisoa; Angela Andriatahina; Jessica Vavisoa; Ravaka Randriatahina; Avotra Rasoafinaritra; Rondro Raherimanana; Christiane Jaofera; Kristina Rakotobe; Sydonie Andriamihajanirina; Elinah Ranarisaona	Réunion; Mélodie Gamarus; Nadia Maleyran; Tanya Sinacouty; Lauriane François; Brillana Domitile-Clain; Aurore Boyer; Laure Dauvin; Cheryl Maledon; Julie Lebian; Edelweiss Rumjaun; Pauline Philippoteau; Zarah Veylleyen	Mayotte; Angélique Malrouf; Caroline Plust; Chloë Njapo Mbuton; Emeline Erichot; Hanati Madi-oili; Keisha Dahalani; Melanie Jeddi; Nasra Ibrahima; Rehanna Fidelice; Saima Ramadani; Salome Bayon; Tiffany Brand
Men's 3×3	Madagascar; Elly Randriamampionona; Rick-Ley Loubacky; Livio Ratianarivo; Alpha Solondrainy	Mayotte; Ahmed Henri Salim; Daniel Chamsidine; Kemal Kaambi; Soihiboudine Boinariziki	Maldives; Abdulla Amzar Mohamed; Ismail Vildhan Yoosuf; Mohamed Khuwailid Ali; Zakariya Abdul Latheef
Women's 3×3	Madagascar; Sydonie Andriamihajanirina; Muriel Hajanirina; Christiane Jaofera; Rondro Raherimanana	Réunion; Coline Gaulin; Pauline Grondin; Nassima Mdahoma; Roxane Paré	Maldives; Fathimath Shameem; Fathimath Athif; Mariyam Kyleen Shirhan; Zuha Ashraf Ali

=== Boxing ===
Event	Gold	Silver	Bronze
Men's 48 kg	Alain Randrianarivony; Madagascar	Elysée Souprayen Padiathy; Mauritius	Tino Gabriel; Seychelles
Men's 51 kg	Fabrice Valérie; Mauritius	Mervine David; Seychelles	Soufiane Ahmed Saïd; Comoros
Men's 51 kg	Fabrice Valérie; Mauritius	Mervine David; Seychelles	Cédric Rakotondramanana; Madagascar
Men's 54 kg	Julien Samourgompoulle; Réunion	Marco Andrianarivelo; Madagascar	Ben Cheikh Hassane; Comoros
Men's 54 kg	Julien Samourgompoulle; Réunion	Marco Andrianarivelo; Madagascar	Kewell Frontin; Mauritius
Men's 57 kg	Niven Chemben; Mauritius	Maoulana Ali; Réunion	Fabio Roselie; Seychelles
Men's 57 kg	Niven Chemben; Mauritius	Maoulana Ali; Réunion	Claudio Rakotomanga; Madagascar
Men's 60 kg	Jean Jerry Agathe; Mauritius	Radjay Youssouf; Comoros	David Moucouveia; Réunion
Men's 60 kg	Jean Jerry Agathe; Mauritius	Radjay Youssouf; Comoros	Jackie Nomenjanahary; Madagascar
Men's 63.5 kg	Richarno Colin; Mauritius	Ryan Bieou; Réunion	Julien Rajaonarison; Madagascar
Men's 67 kg	Jordy Vadamootoo; Mauritius	Shain Boniface; Seychelles	Samir Barouf; Comoros
Men's 67 kg	Jordy Vadamootoo; Mauritius	Shain Boniface; Seychelles	Jose Velomaropihaona; Madagascar
Men's 71 kg	Merven Clair; Mauritius	Edrian Volcère; Seychelles	Charkane Antoy; Réunion
Men's 71 kg	Merven Clair; Mauritius	Edrian Volcère; Seychelles	Mbake Tovonambena; Madagascar
Men's 75 kg	Marquis Amène; Mauritius	Anthony Hoarau; Réunion	Joshua Cousin; Seychelles
Men's 75 kg	Marquis Amène; Mauritius	Anthony Hoarau; Réunion	Robin Rahobiarisoa; Madagascar
Men's 80 kg	Dasheil Fanchette; Seychelles	Jefferson Margueritte; Mauritius	Seraphin Miasa; Madagascar
Men's 86 kg	Jean-Luc Rosalba; Mauritius	Ali Nassur; Comoros	Adrian Laporte-Durup; Seychelles
Men's 86 kg	Jean-Luc Rosalba; Mauritius	Ali Nassur; Comoros	Noel Jaomamelona; Madagascar
Men's 92 kg	Jean-Christophe Otendy; Mauritius	Médéric Souton; Réunion	Azira Razakaiosy; Madagascar
Men's 92 kg	Jean-Christophe Otendy; Mauritius	Médéric Souton; Réunion	Dyan Vidot; Seychelles
Men's +92 kg	Keddy Agnes; Seychelles	Didier Jean-Baptiste; Réunion	Herizo Randriatsimarofy; Madagascar
Men's +92 kg	Keddy Agnes; Seychelles	Didier Jean-Baptiste; Réunion	Leonardo Hassim; Mauritius

=== Cycling (road) ===
Event	Gold	Silver	Bronze
Men's road race	Christopher Lagane; Mauritius	Alexandre Mayer; Mauritius	Dino Mohamed Houlder; Madagascar
Men's time trial	Thomas Lang; Réunion	Alexandre Mayer; Mauritius	Sébastien Elma; Réunion
Men's team time trial	Mauritius; Aurélien de Comarmond; Christopher Lagane; Hanson Matombé; Alexandre Mayer	Réunion; Yannick Assati; Ulrich Marcy; Anthony Pothin; Paur Rivière	Réunion; Emmanuel Chamand; Loïc Cuvelier; Sébastien Elma; Thomas Lang
Women's road race	Raphaëlle Lamusse; Mauritius	Kassandra Legros; Réunion	Isabelle Lebreton; Réunion
Women's time trial	Aurelie Halbwachs; Mauritius	Kassandra Legros; Réunion	Isabelle Lebreton; Réunion
Women's team time trial	Réunion; Céline Bléger; Amandine Le Bihan; Isabelle Lebreton; Kassandra Legros	Mauritius; Lucie de Marigny-Lagesse; Aurelie Halbwachs; Célia Halbwachs; Raphaëlle Lamusse	Réunion; Camille Laugier; Marie Livarate; Marie Payet; Anaïs Roullin

=== Handball ===
Event	Gold	Silver	Bronze
Men	Réunion; Kevin Acadine; Adrien Arthur; Frédéric Budel; Fernand Chane-Kune; Adrien Charlette; Alexandre Charlette; Christophe Coindevel; Luc Dafreville; Rudy Elisabeth; Johan Ethève; Maxime Fèvre; Armand Gomis; Mike Grimaud; Ludovic Grondin; Sébastien Morville; Samuel Mouniama; Damien Nagama; Clarven Ouledi-Vilbrun; Rémy Patchane-Lacane; Jackson Pavade; Fabrice Payet; Didier Ranguin; Loïc Sam-Caw-Frève; Billy Sanspoil; Etienne Varuca	Mayotte; Selemani Abdallah; Ibrahim Abdou; Askalane Ali Bacar; Kayssani Boina; Anli Daniel; Ibn El Daniel; Jeremy Gibiat; Ambdillah Hamidouni; Surtou Hedja; Ndaka Dina Henry; Alexian Hernandez; Anzilani Housseine; Zarouki Lassira; Zouhairi Lassira; Matthew Ma-ouard; El-Yamin Mzeheme; Assadillah Mouslim; Saitu Moussa; Fardi Mouzidaliffa; Keran Patrice Orville; Bacar Saïd; Maanrouf Saïd; Dhoulyadayni Silahi; Nourddine Yahaya	Madagascar; Agustino Tovokely; Aina Andriampaniriana; Amadi Benjara; Anjara Randrianandrasana; Berthino Bezandry; Christian Ramiadanarivo; Eddy Fiankinany; Falisoa Rakotondrainibe; Faniry Rabe; Francky Tovokely; Hanilalaina Rabarijoely; Hery Ranaloniaina; Ismael Ratefiarison; Joel Randrianaivo; Joseph Tovokoelin'i; Julien Ralainmongo; Tondraha Jose; Zonia Rasainharrison
Women	Réunion; Rachel Babou-Carimbacasse; Malaury Bulin; Audrey Darid; Sandrine Demery; Séverine Dijoux; Aline Ducap; Chanaze Fourez; Rachel Hoareau; Lisa Labie; Catherine Lafosse; Gaëlle Lesfrith; Marie-Pierre Lucian; Myrna Malétie; Jennyfer Mitra; Laure Nice; Hélène Pawlak; Orlane Pidolphe; Martine Ringayen; Audrey Robert; Brunella Taochy; Audrey Thomas	Madagascar; Adeline Zarinah; Califfany Rakotonirina; Chamirah Raharitiana; Delima Barada; Farimbona Rakotonatoandro; Fidelicia Ravololonirina; Flavia Rasoanirina; Emeralda Razafinandriana; Jenny Raoelimalala; Aina Ravelonjaka; Natacha Ramasimifidy; Heriniaina Felantsoa; Blondine Laha; Judith Fenoarisoa; Leslie Andonirina; Nicole Randrianarison; Clarisse Rasoanirina; Fredia Zeomeny; Nosianjarasoa Faralalaina; Prisca Navalona; Sahondra Flortine; Solo Razafimaholy; Volatina Rasoamazava	Mayotte; Chamsia Abdallah; Nafissa Abdou; Moihariri Abdourahaman; Foudhoiyla Ahamada; Nirina Bacari; Adélaïde Baco; Marie-Hélène Bitsch; Anzilati Boinaidi; Felina Boura; Mélissa Faure; Danourya Halidi; Clémence-Louise Hebert; Zaina Ma-ouard; Astaoui Maoulana; Naimie Mohamed; Julia Randriamandimby; Choucourati Saïd; Housna Saïd-Omar; Yasmina Saindou; Saloua Salim; Routoubati Soulaimana

=== Judo ===
Event	Gold	Silver	Bronze
Men's 60 kg	Yacinthe Rakotonandrasana; Madagascar	Ethan Baillif; Réunion	Alexis Basque; Réunion
Men's 60 kg	Yacinthe Rakotonandrasana; Madagascar	Ethan Baillif; Réunion	Winsley Gangaya; Mauritius
Men's 66 kg	Vincent Bapin; Réunion	Nicolas Marchal; Mayotte	Loïc Ravina; Mauritius
Men's 66 kg	Vincent Bapin; Réunion	Nicolas Marchal; Mayotte	Ivan Flora; Mauritius
Men's 73 kg	Lova Randrianasolo; Madagascar	Loïc Gosselin; Réunion	Louis Bégué; Mauritius
Men's 73 kg	Lova Randrianasolo; Madagascar	Loïc Gosselin; Réunion	Yves Ravelojaona; Madagascar
Men's 81 kg	Clément Grimaud; Réunion	Mialy Rakotovelo; Madagascar	Fetra Ranaivoarisoa; Madagascar
Men's 81 kg	Clément Grimaud; Réunion	Mialy Rakotovelo; Madagascar	Louis William Edouard; Mauritius
Men's 90 kg	Rémi Feuillet; Mauritius	Fetra Ratsimiziva; Madagascar	Benoît Hoareau; Réunion
Men's 90 kg	Rémi Feuillet; Mauritius	Fetra Ratsimiziva; Madagascar	Alix Crinquette; Mayotte
Men's 100 kg	Roméo Lévêque; Réunion	Raliterasolo Ramalanjaona; Madagascar	Rudolphe Méchin; Mayotte
Men's 100 kg	Roméo Lévêque; Réunion	Raliterasolo Ramalanjaona; Madagascar	Marco Tolinantenaina; Madagascar
Men's +100 kg	Yves-Matthieu Dafreville; Réunion	not awarded	Sébastien Perrine; Mauritius
Men's +100 kg	Yves-Matthieu Dafreville; Réunion	not awarded	Dominic Dugasse; Seychelles
Men's team	Réunion; Vincent Bapin; Loïc Gosselin; Gilles Courteau; Salim Abdouroihamane; Roméo Lévêque	Mauritius; Winsley Gangaya; Louis Bégué; Daniellito Rosidor-Perrine; Rémi Feuillet; Sébastien Perrine; Ivan Flora; Louis William Edouard	Madagascar; Marco Tolinantenaina; Vonjiniaina Ralevazaha; Yves Ravelojaona; Mialy Rakotovelo; Fetra Ratsimiziva; Rianah Ramahefarison; Lova Randrianasolo; Ricky Ramalanjaona; Fetra Ranaivoarisoa
Men's team	Réunion; Vincent Bapin; Loïc Gosselin; Gilles Courteau; Salim Abdouroihamane; Roméo Lévêque	Mauritius; Winsley Gangaya; Louis Bégué; Daniellito Rosidor-Perrine; Rémi Feuillet; Sébastien Perrine; Ivan Flora; Louis William Edouard	Mayotte; Emaïc Makayilly; Nicolas Marchal; Florian Le Joly; Joris Fort; Alix Crinquette; Benjamin Grand; Hachim Said Bakar
Women's 48 kg	Natacha Razafindrakalo; Madagascar	Priscilla Morand; Mauritius	Norah Tieffenbach; Madagascar
Women's 48 kg	Natacha Razafindrakalo; Madagascar	Priscilla Morand; Mauritius	Rayhane Ibouroi; Réunion
Women's 52 kg	Marie Sylva-Rioux; Mauritius	Mirana Rakotovao; Madagascar	Kayzie Mohamed Hachim; Mayotte
Women's 52 kg	Marie Sylva-Rioux; Mauritius	Mirana Rakotovao; Madagascar	Mihanta Andriamifehy; Madagascar
Women's 57 kg	Christianne Legentil; Mauritius	Christiane Vital; Madagascar	Marie Onorine Bégué; Mauritius
Women's 57 kg	Christianne Legentil; Mauritius	Christiane Vital; Madagascar	Narindra Rakotovao; Madagascar
Women's 63 kg	Clarene Jean-Pierre; Mauritius	Marie Pauline Leconte; Mayotte	Angelah Andriamalala; Madagascar
Women's 63 kg	Clarene Jean-Pierre; Mauritius	Marie Pauline Leconte; Mayotte	Naomi Raharison; Réunion
Women's 70 kg	Laura Rasoanaivo; Madagascar	Lucie Viroleau; Réunion	Marie Alexsha Agathe; Mauritius
Women's 70 kg	Laura Rasoanaivo; Madagascar	Lucie Viroleau; Réunion	Manon Martin; Réunion
Women's 78 kg	Cléa Allamélou; Réunion	Hajanirina Andriambololona; Madagascar	Alice Randrianjohany; Madagascar
Women's 78 kg	Cléa Allamélou; Réunion	Hajanirina Andriambololona; Madagascar	Melissa Saint-Pierre; Mauritius
Women's +78 kg	Mayla Bertschy; Réunion	Amandah Payet; Seychelles	Haingonirina Ramiandrisoa; Madagascar
Women's +78 kg	Mayla Bertschy; Réunion	Amandah Payet; Seychelles	Marie Loanne Durhonne; Mauritius
Women's team	Madagascar; Mireille Andrianifehy; Christiane Vital; Narindra Rakotovao; Laura Rasoanaivo; Haingonirina Ramiandrisoa; Mirana Rakotovao	Réunion; Nelsy Chabot; Eunice Chassan; Naomi Raharison; Lucie Viroleau; Mayla Bertschy	Mauritius; Marie Sylva-Rioux; Marie Onorine Bégué; Clarene Jean-Pierre; Marie Loanne Durhonne; Marie Camilla Flore; Priscilla Morand

=== Karate ===
Event	Gold	Silver	Bronze
Men's individual kata	Rock Baronne; Réunion	Hans Ramdharrysing; Mauritius	Bernard Thérésine; Seychelles
Men's individual kata	Rock Baronne; Réunion	Hans Ramdharrysing; Mauritius	Brandon Rakotomalala; Madagascar
Women's individual kata	Gaëlle Rakotonindrina; Madagascar	Ludivine Zitambi; Réunion	Gretel Nenesse; Seychelles
Women's individual kata	Gaëlle Rakotonindrina; Madagascar	Ludivine Zitambi; Réunion	Jade Young Chaung Sive; Mauritius
Men's team kata	Madagascar; Brandon Rakotomalala; Tonisoa Rakotonindrina; Njara Ratsimbarison	Mauritius; Hans Ramdharrysing; Udaiyen Mootoosamy; Rummum Rayyan	Réunion; Damien Barège; Raphaël Lau-Tik; Fabien Rassaby
Women's team kata	Madagascar; Mirantsoa Razafindrakoto; Laurencia Razafindrakoto; Gaëlle Rakotonindrina; Mitia Ranaivoarison	Réunion; Maureen Hibon-Lossy; Elsa Grondin; Ishka Sindraye	Mauritius; Jade Young Chaung Sive; Parveen Bibi Lollta; Coraline Assarapin
Women's team kata	Madagascar; Mirantsoa Razafindrakoto; Laurencia Razafindrakoto; Gaëlle Rakotonindrina; Mitia Ranaivoarison	Réunion; Maureen Hibon-Lossy; Elsa Grondin; Ishka Sindraye	Seychelles; Gretel Nenesse; Stephanie de L'Etourdie; Shujatha Chettiar
Men's kumite 60 kg	Tanjona Rantsoramanana; Madagascar	Mathéo Anquibou; Réunion	Amar Nassuf; Mayotte
Men's kumite 60 kg	Tanjona Rantsoramanana; Madagascar	Mathéo Anquibou; Réunion	Thomas Julien Robert; Mauritius
Men's kumite 67 kg	Ludovic Vitry; Réunion	Billy Rakotobe; Madagascar	Bernard Thérésine; Seychelles
Men's kumite 67 kg	Ludovic Vitry; Réunion	Billy Rakotobe; Madagascar	Kushal Mohabeer; Mauritius
Men's kumite 75 kg	Jean Raherimahaleo; Madagascar	Sullivan Paulo; Réunion	Ayad Rama; Mayotte
Men's kumite 75 kg	Jean Raherimahaleo; Madagascar	Sullivan Paulo; Réunion	Pavan Ramluchumun; Mauritius
Men's kumite 84 kg	Fenosoa Rijaharitiana; Madagascar	Kreetish Venkataswami; Mauritius	Florian Soret; Réunion
Men's kumite 84 kg	Fenosoa Rijaharitiana; Madagascar	Kreetish Venkataswami; Mauritius	David Boniface; Seychelles
Men's kumite +84 kg	Didier Cadarsi; Réunion	Abhishek Ramluchumun; Mauritius	Selwyn Payet; Seychelles
Men's kumite +84 kg	Didier Cadarsi; Réunion	Abhishek Ramluchumun; Mauritius	Dina Rafanomezantsoa; Madagascar
Men's team kumite	Madagascar; Lunosse Ialy; Rija Andriamihaja; Tanjona Rantsoramanana; Fenosoa Rijaharitiana; Mackdonal Mara	Réunion; Mathéo Anquibou; Mathias Fanguimache; Sullivan Paulo; Mikki Jokhun; Didier Cadarsi	Mauritius; Abhishek Ramluchumun; Ishu Mohabeer; Jean Damien Marie; Kreetish Venkataswami; Kushal Mohabeer
Men's team kumite	Madagascar; Lunosse Ialy; Rija Andriamihaja; Tanjona Rantsoramanana; Fenosoa Rijaharitiana; Mackdonal Mara	Réunion; Mathéo Anquibou; Mathias Fanguimache; Sullivan Paulo; Mikki Jokhun; Didier Cadarsi	Mayotte; Abrarh Abdou Hamza; Amar Nassuf; Ayad Rama; Charmzoul Chamassi; Joackim Tavanday
Women's kumite 50 kg	Fenosoa Rakotobe; Madagascar	Kiyana Bouclier; Réunion	Dipshika Bhunjun; Mauritius
Women's kumite 55 kg	Tsiky Andrianavalona; Madagascar	Hima Goness; Mauritius	Élodie Sincère; Réunion
Women's kumite 61 kg	Karine Razafimboninahitra; Madagascar	Océane Wallart; Réunion	Wing Chun Yee Fee Yiong; Mauritius
Women's kumite 68 kg	Jessica Raboanaritompo; Madagascar	Taliane Touli; Mayotte	Malyka Guillou; Réunion
Women's kumite 68 kg	Jessica Raboanaritompo; Madagascar	Taliane Touli; Mayotte	Noémie Valeran; Mauritius
Women's kumite +68 kg	Nancy Ravahamanantsoa; Madagascar	Aurore Pillant; Réunion	Hemshika Danoo; Mauritius
Women's kumite +68 kg	Nancy Ravahamanantsoa; Madagascar	Aurore Pillant; Réunion	Stephanie de L'Etourdie; Seychelles
Women's team kumite	Madagascar; Tsiky Andrianavalona; Karine Razafimboninahitra; Nancy Ravahamanantsoa; Jessica Raboanaritompo; Fenosoa Rakotobe	Réunion; Kiyana Bouclier; Aurore Pillant; Malyka Guillou; Daisy Hoareau; Océane Wallart; Élodie Sincère	Mauritius; Hima Goness; Wing Chun Yee Fee Yiong; Hemshika Danoo; Dipshika Bhunjun; Noémie Valeran
Women's team kumite	Madagascar; Tsiky Andrianavalona; Karine Razafimboninahitra; Nancy Ravahamanantsoa; Jessica Raboanaritompo; Fenosoa Rakotobe	Réunion; Kiyana Bouclier; Aurore Pillant; Malyka Guillou; Daisy Hoareau; Océane Wallart; Élodie Sincère	Seychelles; Gretel Nenesse; Shujatha Chettiar; Stephanie de L'Etourdie; Verna Lesperance

=== Kickboxing ===
Event	Gold	Silver	Bronze
Men's 51 kg	Jean de Dieu Fidèle Arson; Madagascar	Cedrick Dinally; Mauritius	Niad Nassibou; Réunion
Men's 54 kg	Warren Robertson; Mauritius	Cédric Passerel; Réunion	Jean Jores Rakotoniriko; Madagascar
Men's 57 kg	Fabrice Bauluck; Mauritius	Justin Zafy Mariamo; Madagascar	Quentin Refesse; Réunion
Men's 60 kg	Vladis Randriamasiniaina; Madagascar	Brice Vallant; Réunion	Abdoul Kadri Vita Madi; Mayotte
Men's 60 kg	Vladis Randriamasiniaina; Madagascar	Brice Vallant; Réunion	Ryley Jude; Mauritius
Men's 63.5 kg	Dylan Clerville; Réunion	Joël Randrianjafy; Madagascar	David Chorel; Mayotte
Men's 63.5 kg	Dylan Clerville; Réunion	Joël Randrianjafy; Madagascar	Jean-Michel Lisette; Mauritius
Men's 67 kg	Birinod Lahamahavonjy; Madagascar	Samuel Javegny; Réunion	Emmanuel Dalon; Mauritius
Men's 71 kg	Julien Testan; Réunion	Elfazar Razanajatovo; Madagascar	Alexander Spéville; Mauritius
Men's 75 kg	Donovan Lisette; Mauritius	Boris Siva; Réunion	Fabrice Andrianantenaina; Madagascar
Men's 81 kg	José Andriamaharo; Madagascar	Eddy Payet; Réunion	Maxime Rochefeuille; Mayotte
Men's 81 kg	José Andriamaharo; Madagascar	Eddy Payet; Réunion	Jérémie Rabais; Mauritius
Women's 48 kg	Bienvenue Randriamiarina; Madagascar	Brunella Araux; Réunion	Nellia Marjolin; Mauritius
Women's 52 kg	Sandra Rakotoarison; Madagascar	Stania Rathbone; Mauritius	not awarded
Women's 56 kg	Annaëlle Coret; Mauritius	Claudia Raharimanana; Madagascar	Déborah Jucourt; Réunion
Women's 60 kg	Elysée Razanabahoaka; Madagascar	Mégane Prosper; Mauritius	not awarded
Women's 65 kg	Issa-Elhadji Machillour; Madagascar	Thérèse Said; Mayotte	Béatrice Lallchand; Mauritius

=== Para-athletics ===
Men

Event	Class	Gold	Silver	Bronze
100 m	T11–13	Félix Tovondrainy; Madagascar	Rosario Marianne; Mauritius	Abdul Samad Razzag; Maldives
100 m	T/F20	Mathéo Gilbert Galard; Réunion	Denovan Rabaye; Mauritius	Andrew Michael Aubrey; Seychelles
800 m	T/F20	Philippe Yovanni; Mauritius	Tony Pause; Réunion	Edouard Nambinintsoa; Madagascar
Long jump	T/F20	Eddy Capdor; Mauritius	Mathéo Gilbert Galard; Réunion	Andrew Michael Aubrey; Seychelles
Shot put	T/F20	Jean-François Sénèque; Mauritius	Richard Sopha; Seychelles	Cédric Lapierre; Réunion
1500 m	T31–34 & T51–57	Cédric Ravet; Mauritius	Herinjaka Raholijaona; Madagascar	Gerry Theresine; Seychelles
200 m	Deaf	Nassor Nassur; Comoros	Papa Ali Nassim; Comoros	Fredon Rakotomanana; Madagascar
Long jump	Deaf	Loïc Durhone; Mauritius	Nassor Nassur; Comoros	Samuel Morel; Seychelles

Women

Event	Class	Gold	Silver	Bronze
100 m	T11–13	Anndora Asaun; Mauritius	Aurélie Faravavy; Madagascar	Fathimath Ibrahim; Maldives
100 m	T/F20	Melissa Prudence; Mauritius	Marwaqqchabna Abdallah; Comoros	Hery Randrianandraina; Madagascar
800 m	T/F20	Ashley Telvave; Mauritius	Martine Georgia; Madagascar	Melissa Prudence; Mauritius
Long jump	T/F20	Ashley Telvave; Mauritius	Melissa Prudence; Mauritius	Alisha Gertrude; Seychelles
Shot put	T/F20	Brigila Clair; Mauritius	Rosie Coralie; Seychelles	Margaret Gustave; Réunion
1500 m	T31–34 & T51–57	Marie Desirella Perrine; Mauritius	Mbolatiana Rakotoniaina; Madagascar	Chelsy Nacaouele; Réunion
200 m	Deaf	Nancy Andrianarindra; Madagascar	Shleysha Lokheeram; Mauritius	Laureen Alamelle; Réunion
Long jump	Deaf	Miarimbolatiana Njakatiana; Madagascar	Shleysha Lokheeram; Mauritius	Laureen Alamelle; Réunion

=== Para swimming ===
Event	Class	Gold	Silver	Bronze
Men's 50 m freestyle	S1–S10	Scody Victor; Mauritius	José Rakotondramady; Madagascar	Hassane Ahamada Djaé; Comoros
Men's 50 m freestyle	S14	Fahad Ahamada; Comoros	Frederick Gappy; Seychelles	Joseph Adriano Momus; Mauritius
Men's 50 m freestyle	S15	Suffian Ropun; Mauritius	Robert Lucas; Réunion	Jacquelin Rajaobelina; Madagascar
Women's 50 m freestyle	S1–S10	Vallerisyna Bon Temps Avizara; Madagascar	Aude Lorianne Vilmont; Mauritius	not awarded
Women's 50 m freestyle	S14	Najiibah Joomun; Mauritius	Fanosoa Randrianalifera; Madagascar	Lunadine Lincar; Réunion
Women's 50 m freestyle	S15	Lachana Marday; Mauritius	Toussanti Hassane; Comoros	Ahmed Coco Shanice; Réunion

=== Pétanque ===
Event	Gold	Silver	Bronze
Men's shooting	Parvez Khodabaccus; Mauritius	Guillaume Ralison; Madagascar	Youssouf Djanfar; Comoros
Men's shooting	Parvez Khodabaccus; Mauritius	Guillaume Ralison; Madagascar	Salim Raza Sookharry; Mauritius
Men's singles	Zoël Tonitsihoarana; Madagascar	Nicolas Chamand; Réunion	Tafita Andiamahandry; Madagascar
Men's singles	Zoël Tonitsihoarana; Madagascar	Nicolas Chamand; Réunion	Sunil Kumar Sumoreeah; Mauritius
Men's doubles	Madagascar; Zoël Tonitsihoarana; Yves Rakotoarisoa	Mauritius; Salim Raza Sookharry; Sunil Kumar Sumoreeah	Madagascar; Celestin Rakotomamonjy; Herilantsoa Razafimahatratra
Men's doubles	Madagascar; Zoël Tonitsihoarana; Yves Rakotoarisoa	Mauritius; Salim Raza Sookharry; Sunil Kumar Sumoreeah	Mauritius; Louis Stephano Sylvio; Ravin Gopaul
Men's triples	Madagascar; Tafita Andiamahandry; Faly Andrianantenaina; Hariliva Andrianasolo; Haja Rafanomezantsoa	Mauritius; Louis Stephano Sylvio; Sunil Kumar Sumoreeah; Fabrice Vincent; Parvez Khodabaccus	Madagascar; Faratiana Rakotoniaina; Yves Rakotoarisoa; Celestin Rakotomamonjy; Guillaume Ralison
Men's triples	Madagascar; Tafita Andiamahandry; Faly Andrianantenaina; Hariliva Andrianasolo; Haja Rafanomezantsoa	Mauritius; Louis Stephano Sylvio; Sunil Kumar Sumoreeah; Fabrice Vincent; Parvez Khodabaccus	Seychelles; Joseph Sinon; Fabien Chang-Time; Roy Meriton; Armstrong Jean
Women's shooting	Isabelle Rivière; Réunion	Judicaël Andrianarimalala; Madagascar	Katiza Zafitody; Mayotte
Women's shooting	Isabelle Rivière; Réunion	Judicaël Andrianarimalala; Madagascar	Prisca Raberanto; Madagascar
Women's singles	Fanantenana Ravomanana; Madagascar	Élodie Idmont; Réunion	Mirana Razafinakanga; Madagascar
Women's singles	Fanantenana Ravomanana; Madagascar	Élodie Idmont; Réunion	Katiza Zafitody; Mayotte
Women's doubles	Madagascar; Mamy Herisoa; Tahina Rafarasoa	Réunion; Jennifer Armougom; Isabelle Rivière	Mauritius; Pamela Wong; M. D. Candy-Teycheney
Women's doubles	Madagascar; Mamy Herisoa; Tahina Rafarasoa	Réunion; Jennifer Armougom; Isabelle Rivière	Seychelles; Vinna Fanny; Sheila Haffner
Women's triples	Madagascar; Odile Razanamahefa; Prisca Raberanto; Mamy Herisoa; Tahina Rafarasoa	Comoros; Naila Ibrahim; Mousrianti Attoumane; Echata Mohamed	Madagascar; Miary Malalaharison; Judicaël Andrianarimalala; Mirana Razafinakanga; Harinivi Randriamalala
Women's triples	Madagascar; Odile Razanamahefa; Prisca Raberanto; Mamy Herisoa; Tahina Rafarasoa	Comoros; Naila Ibrahim; Mousrianti Attoumane; Echata Mohamed	Comoros; Amina Said Ahamada; Mannanour Zaki; Taouhida Ali Haouthou
Mixed doubles	Madagascar; Faly Andrianantenaina; Christinah Razafimbola	Comoros; Hazdine Radjabou; Amina Said Ahamada	Réunion; Frédéric Pothin; Pauline Vandenbroucke
Mixed doubles	Madagascar; Faly Andrianantenaina; Christinah Razafimbola	Comoros; Hazdine Radjabou; Amina Said Ahamada	Comoros; Miftahou M'Doihoma Djaé; Echata Mohamed

=== Rugby sevens ===
Event	Gold	Silver	Bronze
Men	Madagascar; Danielson Randriarilala; Hery Rakotomanalina; Jean-Yves Randriamalala; Mamy Ranaivoarison; Mickael Rajeriarison; Nofy Rakotonirina; Lahatra Ramamonjisoa; Alex Ranaivoson; Sitraka Rabemanajara; Tiana Ravelomanatsoa; Victorien Randrianomenjanahary; Tinella Rabemanajara; Pascal Rakotobe	Réunion; Romain Bigey; Antoine Chiaverini; Baptiste Denamiel; Louan Journe; Hugo Ledez; Erwan Levilain; Thomas Maby; Julien Munnier; Théo Pinana; Hugo Rodor; Enzo Russier; Arthur Sabatier	Mauritius; Ryddick Bergicourt; Xavier Charoux; Étienne Ferrat; Olivier Lagesse; Florian Maigrot; Alexis Merle; Harel Nathan; Quentin Noël; Romain Rivalland; Zachary Rodber; Christophe Rousset; Shaun Toussaint
Women	Madagascar; Mamy Hanitriniaina; Claudia Rasoarimalala; Delphine Raharimalala; Ginah Raharimalala; Joela Mirasoa; Laurence Rasoanandrasana; Christina Bodonandrianina; Monica Rasoloniaina; Oliviane Andriatsilavina; Tiana Razanamahefa; Valisoa Razakaniaina; Zaya Fanantenana	Réunion; Laura Bantoure; Zoé Bezanilla; Ivana Boyer; Pauline Delgrossi; Raphaëlle Georges-Skelly; Carla Mathiot; Camille Patry; Alyssa Renault; Maëva Savignan; Marie Seguin; Ana Vasovic; Séverine Wock-Taï	Mayotte; Magdalena Alliaud; Ninon Cecillon; Salome Curti; Marion Defrene; Claire Dumortier; Beryl Eberstein; Nazira Haroussi-Madi; Rakchina Ibrahim; Tatiana Laborie; Yousra Mohidine; Antika Moussa; Itissame Soulaimana

=== Swimming ===
Men

Event	Gold	Silver	Bronze
50 m freestyle	Ovesh Purahoo; Mauritius	Gregory Anodin; Mauritius	Amos Ferley; Seychelles
100 m freestyle	Gregory Anodin; Mauritius	Ovesh Purahoo; Mauritius	Timéo Bordier; Réunion
200 m freestyle	Maël Dijoux; Réunion	Simon Bachmann; Seychelles	Jean-Baptiste Bernet; Réunion
400 m freestyle	Maël Dijoux; Réunion	Timothy Leberl; Mauritius	Simon Bachmann; Seychelles
1500 m freestyle	Maël Dijoux; Réunion	Timothy Leberl; Mauritius	Damien Payet; Seychelles
50 m backstroke	Pierre-Yves Desprez; Réunion	Ando Ramiakatrarivo; Madagascar	Anthony Thiriot; Réunion
100 m backstroke	Pierre-Yves Desprez; Réunion	Kushen Govinden; Mauritius	Farhaan Ali Muslun; Mauritius
200 m backstroke	Pierre-Yves Desprez; Réunion	Kushen Govinden; Mauritius	Tendry Rakotobe; Madagascar
50 m breaststroke	Jonathan Raharvel; Madagascar	Hans Li Ying Pin; Mauritius	Daniel Randrianarisoa; Madagascar
100 m breaststroke	Jonathan Raharvel; Madagascar	Hans Li Ying Pin; Mauritius	Jonathan Chung Yee; Mauritius
200 m breaststroke	Jonathan Raharvel; Madagascar	Jonathan Chung Yee; Mauritius	Hans Li Ying Pin; Mauritius
50 m butterfly	Clément Rivière; Réunion	Adam Moncherry; Seychelles	Victor Ah Yong; Mauritius
100 m butterfly	Clément Rivière; Réunion	Victor Ah Yong; Mauritius	Simon Bachmann; Seychelles
200 m butterfly	Simon Bachmann; Seychelles	Clément Rivière; Réunion	Victor Ah Yong; Mauritius
200 m individual medley	Simon Bachmann; Seychelles	Maël Dijoux; Réunion	Matteo Tin Wan Yuen; Mauritius
400 m individual medley	Simon Bachmann; Seychelles	Maël Dijoux; Réunion	Jean-Baptiste Bernet; Réunion
4×100 m freestyle relay	Réunion; Timéo Bordier; Pierre-Yves Desprez; Maël Dijoux; Clément Rivière	Mauritius; Victor Ah Yong; Gregory Anodin; Varen Lutchmanen; Ovesh Purahoo	Seychelles; Simon Bachmann; Amos Ferley; Adam Moncherry; Nathan Nagapin
4×200 m freestyle relay	Réunion; Jean-Baptiste Bernet; Timéo Bordier; Maël Dijoux; Clément Rivière	Mauritius; Victor Ah Yong; Adrien Ciceron; Timothy Leberl; Shawn Li Hing Duen	Seychelles; Simon Bachmann; Amos Ferley; Damien Payet; Thierry Payet
4×100 m medley relay	Réunion; Timéo Bordier; Pierre-Yves Desprez; Matys Louise; Clément Rivière	Mauritius; Victor Ah Yong; Kushen Govinden; Hans Li Ying Pin; Ovesh Purahoo	Madagascar; Jonathan Raharvel; Mathieu Andriampenomanana; Tendry Rakotobe; Tiavina Rakotomamonjy

Women

Event	Gold	Silver	Bronze
50 m freestyle	Alizée Morel; Réunion	Emma Morel; Réunion	Felicity Passon; Seychelles
100 m freestyle	Alizée Morel; Réunion	Felicity Passon; Seychelles	Emma Morel; Réunion
200 m freestyle	Alizée Morel; Réunion	Felicity Passon; Seychelles	Anishta Teeluck; Mauritius
400 m freestyle	Alizée Morel; Réunion	Sarah K'Bidi; Réunion	Gabrielle Bathfield; Mauritius
800 m freestyle	Alizée Morel; Réunion	Sarah K'Bidi; Réunion	Sofie Frichot; Seychelles
50 m backstroke	Emma Morel; Réunion	Felicity Passon; Seychelles	Holy Antsa Rabejaona; Madagascar
100 m backstroke	Emma Morel; Réunion	Anishta Teeluck; Mauritius	Felicity Passon; Seychelles
200 m backstroke	Anishta Teeluck; Mauritius	Felicity Passon; Seychelles	Julie Nadaud; Réunion
50 m breaststroke	Ruth Tessa Ip Hen Cheung; Mauritius	Mahée Gory-Lauret; Réunion	Élisa Montrouge; Réunion
100 m breaststroke	Ruth Tessa Ip Hen Cheung; Mauritius	Mahée Gory-Lauret; Réunion	Élisa Montrouge; Réunion
200 m breaststroke	Ruth Tessa Ip Hen Cheung; Mauritius	Mahée Gory-Lauret; Réunion	Liliana Mason; Seychelles
50 m butterfly	Emma Morel; Réunion	Felicity Passon; Seychelles	Holy Antsa Rabejaona; Madagascar
100 m butterfly	Emma Morel; Réunion	Felicity Passon; Seychelles	Annah Auckburaullee; Mauritius
200 m butterfly	Gabrielle Bathfield; Mauritius	Lily-Jeanne Hocquette; Réunion	Elsa Bordier; Réunion
200 m individual medley	Felicity Passon; Seychelles	Mahée Gory-Lauret; Réunion	Élisa Montrouge; Réunion
400 m individual medley	Lily-Jeanne Hocquette; Réunion	Alysson Yene Teck; Mauritius	Angelina Smythe; Seychelles
4×100 m freestyle relay	Réunion; Mahée Gory-Lauret; Élisa Montrouge; Alizée Morel; Emma Morel	Seychelles; Khema Elizabeth; Sofie Frichot; Aaliyah Palestrini; Felicity Passon	Mauritius; Gabrielle Bathfield; Ruth Tessa Ip Hen Cheung; Eunnice Ramdhun; Anishta Teeluck
4×200 m freestyle relay	Réunion; Mahée Gory-Lauret; Sarah K'bidi; Alizée Morel; Emma Morel	Seychelles; Khema Elizabeth; Sofie Frichot; Aaliyah Palestrini; Felicity Passon	Mauritius; Gabrielle Bathfield; Ruth Tessa Ip Hen Cheung; Anishta Teeluck; Alysson Yene Teck
4×100 m medley relay	Réunion; Mahée Gory-Lauret; Alizée Morel; Emma Morel; Julie Nadaud	Mauritius; Annah Auckburaullee; Ruth Tessa Ip Hen Cheung; Eunnice Ramdhun; Anishta Teeluck	Madagascar; Idealy Tendrinavalona; Nomena Jauslin; Holy Antsa Rabejaona; Finaritra Razakatiana

Mixed

Event	Gold	Silver	Bronze
4×100 m freestyle relay	Réunion; Timéo Bordier; Alizée Morel; Emma Morel; Clément Rivière	Mauritius; Gregory Anodin; Ruth Tessa Ip Cheung; Ovesh Purahoo; Anishta Teeluck	Seychelles; Simon Bachmann; Khema Elizabeth; Adam Moncherry; Felicity Passon
4×100 m medley relay	Réunion; Pierre-Yves Desprez; Alizée Morel; Emma Morel; Matys Louise	Mauritius; Anishta Teeluck; Ruth Tessa Ip Cheung; Victor Ah Young; Gregory Anodin	Madagascar; Idealy Tendrinavalona; Holy Antsa Rabejaona; Jonathan Raharvel; Tiavina Rakotomamonjy

=== Table tennis ===
Event	Gold	Silver	Bronze
Men's singles	Jonathan Nativel; Madagascar	Mohamed Shaffan Ismail; Maldives	Brian Chan Yook Fo; Mauritius
Women's singles	Fathimath Dheema Ali; Maldives	Aishath Rafa Nazim; Maldives	Ruqayyah Kinoo; Mauritius
Men's doubles	Madagascar; Jonathan Nativel; Mahefa Randrianantoandro	Maldives; Mohamed Shaffan Ismail; Moosa Munsif Ahmed	Mauritius; Zayyan bin Sheik Hossein; Akhilen Yogarajah
Women's doubles	Maldives; Aishath Rafa Nazim; Fathimath Dheema Ali	Mauritius; Oumehani Hosenally; Nandershwaree Jalim	Mauritius; Ruqayyah Kinoo; Ivana Desscann
Mixed doubles	Maldives; Aishath Rafa Nazim; Moosa Munsif Ahmed	Madagascar; Harena Dimbimiarilanitra; Jonathan Nativel	Maldives; Fathimath Dheema Ali; Mohamed Shaffan Ismail
Men's team	Madagascar; Mahefa Randrianantoandro; Mamy Rakotoarisoa; Jonathan Nativel; Zo Razafindralambo; Antoine Razafinarivo; Fabio Rakotoarimanana; Rhandy Rakotondrazaka; Rinaud Lefitriniaina	Maldives; Ahmed Khalid Akhyar; Mohamed Zeesth Naseem; Mohamed Shaffan Ismail; Moosa Munsif Ahmed; Mohamed Thabin Sujau; Zeek Hassan Latheef	Réunion; Julien Gaudet; Thomas Le Breton; Jean-Sébastien Pothin; Quentin Vedapodagom; Ewen Gannat-Perrot; Sébastien Maillot; Pierre Boisedou
Women's team	Maldives; Aminath Shiura Shareef; Fathimath Dheema Ali; Aishath Rafa Nazim; Laisa Fathuhulla Smail; Fathimath Jumana Nimal; Mishka Ibrahim	Mauritius; Oumehani Hosenally; Nandershwaree Jalim; Ruqayyah Kinoo; Ivana Desscann; Maéna Loïka André; Zaynah Sadoolah	Réunion; Astrid Almery; Solène Almery; Maïa Merlet; Marion Moufflet; Angélique Le Bihan; Muriel Fontaine

=== Taekwondo ===
Poomsae

Event	Gold	Silver	Bronze
Men's 30 years	Paqui Esther; Réunion	Kevin Rajoelina; Madagascar	Albans Veerabadren; Mauritius
Men's 40 years	Sheldon Kim Yan Too Sang; Mauritius	Nicolas Thia Song Fat; Réunion	Willy Andriamangasolo; Madagascar
Men's 50 years	Barlen Marday; Mauritius	Gilbert Rakotondranarivo; Madagascar	not awarded
Men's 60 years	Nicolas De Gonzague; Madagascar	Stéphane Mackay; Mauritius	not awarded
Women's 30 years	Candice Niclin; Réunion	Anne Laure Chung Cheung; Mauritius	Steffi Rakotondravao; Madagascar
Women's 40 years	Mathilde Thiao-Layel; Réunion	Johanne Ramaniraka; Madagascar	Fathimath Ibrahim; Maldives
Women's 50 years	Patricia Rasamiharivololona; Madagascar	not awarded	not awarded
Women's 60 years	Michele Hung Quian Din; Mauritius	Valérie Rasolofo; Madagascar	not awarded

Gyeorugi

Event	Gold	Silver	Bronze
Men's 54 kg	Nelson Mampionona; Madagascar	Dimitri Séverin; Réunion	Halifa Ahmed Abdou; Comoros
Men's 58 kg	Jarry Razakarisoa; Madagascar	Denilson Vardapin; Réunion	Nasserdine Abdoul-Kamal; Comoros
Men's 63 kg	Lai Stanley Toandro; Madagascar	Florian Paton; Réunion	Ali Ahmed; Comoros
Men's 68 kg	Quentin Barré; Réunion	Franck Albertini; Mayotte	Steve Rakotobe; Madagascar
Men's 74 kg	Michou Randrianalison; Madagascar	Diesson Joseph; Mauritius	Mohamed M'roivili; Comoros
Men's 80 kg	Bradley Rasolofo; Madagascar	not awarded	not awarded
Men's 87 kg	Jordan Kan; Madagascar	Ahmed Fazeel; Maldives	Baboo Sohun; Mauritius
Men's +87 kg	Ando Ny Randriantsoa; Madagascar	Zoulkee Muhamad; Mauritius	not awarded
Women's 46 kg	Chloé Marian; Réunion	Gracia Ravoson; Madagascar	Jannath Jawad; Maldives
Women's 49 kg	Tarah Ratsitohara; Madagascar	not awarded	not awarded
Women's 53 kg	Fenitra Randriamazaka; Madagascar	Fathimath Ibrahim; Maldives	Anne Laure Chung Cheung; Mauritius
Women's 57 kg	Claudine Fanomezantsoa; Madagascar	not awarded	not awarded
Women's 62 kg	Émeline K'Bidi; Réunion	Florentine Razafindrabe; Madagascar	Fathimath Ibrahim; Maldives
Women's 67 kg	Lalli Goulamoussene; Réunion	Fy Ny Rakotomanana; Madagascar	Ilona Adam; Comoros
Women's 73 kg	Mira Goulamoussene; Réunion	Estelle Voahanginirina; Madagascar	Michelle Hung Quian Din; Mauritius
Women's +73 kg	Mihaja Ramanantsoa; Madagascar	not awarded	not awarded

=== Tennis ===
Event	Gold	Silver	Bronze
Men's singles	Florent Bax; Réunion	Toky Ranaivo; Madagascar	Lucas Andriamasilalao; Madagascar
Women's singles	Mialy Ranaivo; Madagascar	Pauline Payet; Réunion	Andraina Mitia Voavy; Madagascar
Men's doubles	Réunion; Florent Bax; Giovanni Romeo	Madagascar; Toky Ranaivo; Lucas Andriamasilalao	Madagascar; Fenosoa Andrianantenaina; Romeo Rakotomalala
Women's doubles	Madagascar; Mialy Ranaivo; Andraina Mitia Voavy	Madagascar; Harena Voaviandraina; Narindra Ranaivo	Réunion; Pauline Payet; Emmanuelle Girard
Mixed team	Réunion; Florent Bax; Emmanuelle Girard; Pauline Payet	Madagascar; Fenosoa Andrianantenaina; Mialy Ranaivo; Narindra Ranaivo; Toky Ranaivo	Mauritius; Christopher Fok Kow; Jake Lam Hau Ching; Sacha Lefébure; Solène Lefébure; Zara Lennon

=== Volleyball ===
Event	Gold	Silver	Bronze
Men	Réunion; William Bersani da Costa; Grégoire Capitaine; Victor Castori; Aziradji Chadhouli; Sébastien Ducange; Julien Imache; Gabriel Jaunet; Robert Labenne; Matthieu Mouëzy; Cédric Narayanin; Heritiana Rivoharilala; Laurent Soundron; Julien Talbot; Fabien Vergoz	Madagascar; Andry Rakoto; Athanase Rabarivelo; Avosoa Narmiell; Fenohasina Ranaivoson; Fenozara Andriamanoha; Finiaina Rakotovao; Finition Rakotoarison; Gerardinos Kamaka; Ghislain Rivoharilala; Irina Rampanana; Judi Ramamonjisoa; Mamizara Andriamanoha; Mamode Maharetasoa; Manohisoa Razafinjatovo; Nirina Tolojanahary; Tsiory Randriamanantena	Mauritius; Hensley Casimir; Louis Allan Esther; William Esther; Dharmendra Gundowry; Darene Isnard; Cédric Jolicoeur; Steward Joseph; Thommy Labour; Kevin Larose; Jeffrey Leopold; Stéphane Moonisamy; Bryan Perrine; Fabrice Pierre-Louis; Mattew Quirin; Alain Radoo; James Loïc Speville
Women	Seychelles; Angelique Adeline; Elsina Biong; Marielle Bonne; Melina Crispin; Nayeli Etienne; Dania Hoareau; Natifa Marengo; Kelly Matombe; Manuela Monthy; Hillary Nourrice; Petra Richard; Vanita Rose; Cathrina Simon; Tania Solin; Bryna Sultan; Petrina Victor	Madagascar; Andreas Ramanintsy; Armella Andrianjato; Clara Razafiarisoa; Eugenie Razanabelo; Hobisoa Randrianasolo; Marthline Zarafidy; Miahy Randriamarosoa; Milanto Andriamanalina; Nadia Razafimahatratra; Nandrianina Randrianasolo; Noela Andriamanoha; Ny Zo Tafitasoa; Rojotiana Rasoarahona; Sarah Manahadraiandriatafika	Mauritius; Stacy Armoogum; Liza Bonne; Vanessa Chellumben; Rachel Christine; Manuella Cupidon; Rachel Etiennet; Alison Labour; Marie Laretif; Marie-Danielle Latour; Nathalia Letendrie; Valentine Paul; Jelissa Perrine; Liliana Perrine; Kerry-Ann Pierre-Louis

=== Weightlifting ===
Men

Event	Class	Gold	Silver	Bronze
Snatch	55 kg	Elarion Ramiarimanana; Madagascar	Willem Émile; Mauritius	Fitiavantsoa Ratsidiarinanbinina; Madagascar
Clean & jerk	55 kg	Elarion Ramiarimanana; Madagascar	Fitiavantsoa Ratsidiarinanbinina; Madagascar	Willem Émile; Mauritius
Total	55 kg	Elarion Ramiarimanana; Madagascar	Fitiavantsoa Ratsidiarinanbinina; Madagascar	Willem Émile; Mauritius
Snatch	61 kg	Éric Andriantsitohaina; Madagascar	Antonin Brousse de Gersigny; Mauritius	Leeam Robert; Seychelles
Clean & jerk	61 kg	Éric Andriantsitohaina; Madagascar	Antonin Brousse de Gersigny; Mauritius	Leeam Robert; Seychelles
Total	61 kg	Éric Andriantsitohaina; Madagascar	Antonin Brousse de Gersigny; Mauritius	Leeam Robert; Seychelles
Snatch	67 kg	Jules Andriamahefa; Madagascar	Jonathan Coret; Mauritius	Kenzie Tayer; Mauritius
Clean & jerk	67 kg	Jules Andriamahefa; Madagascar	Jonathan Coret; Mauritius	Kenzie Tayer; Mauritius
Total	67 kg	Jules Andriamahefa; Madagascar	Jonathan Coret; Mauritius	Kenzie Tayer; Mauritius
Snatch	73 kg	Tojonirina Andriantsitohaina; Madagascar	Louis Wayne Martinson; Mauritius	Jérôme Lefèvre; Réunion
Clean & jerk	73 kg	Tojonirina Andriantsitohaina; Madagascar	Rick Yves Confiance; Seychelles	Louis Wayne Martinson; Mauritius
Total	73 kg	Tojonirina Andriantsitohaina; Madagascar	Rick Yves Confiance; Seychelles	Louis Wayne Martinson; Mauritius
Snatch	81 kg	Ezra Ranaivoson; Madagascar	Dinesh Pandoo; Mauritius	Ravo Fanomezantsoa; Madagascar
Clean & jerk	81 kg	Ravo Fanomezantsoa; Madagascar	Dinesh Pandoo; Mauritius	Hugo Bevilacqua; Réunion
Total	81 kg	Ravo Fanomezantsoa; Madagascar	Dinesh Pandoo; Mauritius	Hugo Bevilacqua; Réunion
Snatch	89 kg	Fanambina Randrianjatovo; Madagascar	Terence Augustine; Mauritius	Dan Parassouramin; Réunion
Clean & jerk	89 kg	Terence Augustine; Mauritius	Fanambina Randrianjatovo; Madagascar	Julien Omar; Réunion
Total	89 kg	Terence Augustine; Mauritius	Fanambina Randrianjatovo; Madagascar	Julien Omar; Réunion
Snatch	96 kg	Arthur Froger; Réunion	Claudio Randrianavalona; Madagascar	not awarded
Clean & jerk	96 kg	Claudio Randrianavalona; Madagascar	Arthur Froger; Réunion	not awarded
Total	96 kg	Claudio Randrianavalona; Madagascar	Arthur Froger; Réunion	not awarded
Snatch	102 kg	Dorian Madanamootoo; Mauritius	Mamintsoa Hery Ny Aina; Madagascar	Terrence Dixie; Seychelles
Clean & jerk	102 kg	Mamintsoa Hery Ny Aina; Madagascar	Dorian Madanamootoo; Mauritius	Terrence Dixie; Seychelles
Total	102 kg	Mamintsoa Hery Ny Aina; Madagascar	Dorian Madanamootoo; Mauritius	Terrence Dixie; Seychelles
Snatch	109 kg	Khelwin Juboo; Mauritius	Cyrous Farabeau; Seychelles	Saïd Ali Oumouri; Comoros
Clean & jerk	109 kg	Khelwin Juboo; Mauritius	Cyrous Farabeau; Seychelles	Saïd Ali Oumouri; Comoros
Total	109 kg	Khelwin Juboo; Mauritius	Cyrous Farabeau; Seychelles	Saïd Ali Oumouri; Comoros
Snatch	+109 kg	Bryan Virginius; Réunion	Dereck Come; Seychelles	Anthony Rabaud; Mayotte
Clean & jerk	+109 kg	Bryan Virginius; Réunion	Dereck Come; Seychelles	Anthony Rabaud; Mayotte
Total	+109 kg	Bryan Virginius; Réunion	Dereck Come; Seychelles	Anthony Rabaud; Mayotte

Women

Event	Class	Gold	Silver	Bronze
Snatch	45 kg	Rosina Randafiarison; Madagascar	Sheridane Pasnin; Mauritius	Fabia Andriamitantsoa; Madagascar
Clean & jerk	45 kg	Rosina Randafiarison; Madagascar	Fabia Andriamitantsoa; Madagascar	Sheridane Pasnin; Mauritius
Total	45 kg	Rosina Randafiarison; Madagascar	Fabia Andriamitantsoa; Madagascar	Sheridane Pasnin; Mauritius
Snatch	49 kg	ZL Ny Hasina Andriamitantsoa; Madagascar	Stéphanie Lauret; Réunion	Anne Delphine Volbert; Mauritius
Clean & jerk	49 kg	ZL Ny Hasina Andriamitantsoa; Madagascar	Stéphanie Lauret; Réunion	Anne Delphine Volbert; Mauritius
Total	49 kg	ZL Ny Hasina Andriamitantsoa; Madagascar	Stéphanie Lauret; Réunion	Anne Delphine Volbert; Mauritius
Snatch	55 kg	Sarikaniaina Bakoliharisoa; Madagascar	Solène Boutin; Réunion	Noémie Petitfourt; Mayotte
Clean & jerk	55 kg	Sarikaniaina Bakoliharisoa; Madagascar	Solène Boutin; Réunion	Noémie Petitfourt; Mayotte
Total	55 kg	Sarikaniaina Bakoliharisoa; Madagascar	Solène Boutin; Réunion	Noémie Petitfourt; Mayotte
Snatch	59 kg	Angeline Rakotoharisoa; Madagascar	Morgane Vermont; Réunion	Doushka Gopaloodoo; Mauritius
Clean & jerk	59 kg	Angeline Rakotoharisoa; Madagascar	Morgane Vermont; Réunion	Doushka Gopaloodoo; Mauritius
Total	59 kg	Angeline Rakotoharisoa; Madagascar	Morgane Vermont; Réunion	Doushka Gopaloodoo; Mauritius
Snatch	64 kg	Vania Ravololoniaina; Madagascar	Loane Payet; Réunion	Clementina Agricole; Seychelles
Clean & jerk	64 kg	Loane Payet; Réunion	Clementina Agricole; Seychelles	Vania Ravololoniaina; Madagascar
Total	64 kg	Loane Payet; Réunion	Clementina Agricole; Seychelles	Vania Ravololoniaina; Madagascar
Snatch	71 kg	Seforah Lent; Mauritius	Clarisse Tissot; Réunion	Laurie Savary; Mayotte
Clean & jerk	71 kg	Seforah Lent; Mauritius	Laurie Savary; Mayotte	Clarisse Tissot; Réunion
Total	71 kg	Seforah Lent; Mauritius	Laurie Savary; Mayotte	Clarisse Tissot; Réunion
Snatch	76 kg	Ketty Lent; Mauritius	Joleita Coloma; Seychelles	Harisoa Razafy; Madagascar
Clean & jerk	76 kg	Ketty Lent; Mauritius	Joleita Coloma; Seychelles	Harisoa Razafy; Madagascar
Total	76 kg	Ketty Lent; Mauritius	Joleita Coloma; Seychelles	Harisoa Razafy; Madagascar
Snatch	81 kg	Alison Sunee; Mauritius	Axelle Soananahary; Madagascar	Lisa Leibundguth; Réunion
Clean & jerk	81 kg	Lisa Leibundguth; Réunion	Alison Sunee; Mauritius	Axelle Soananahary; Madagascar
Total	81 kg	Alison Sunee; Mauritius	Lisa Leibundguth; Réunion	Axelle Soananahary; Madagascar
Snatch	87 kg	Anastajia Babet; Mauritius	Marjorie Hoareau; Réunion	not awarded
Clean & jerk	87 kg	Anastajia Babet; Mauritius	Marjorie Hoareau; Réunion	not awarded
Total	87 kg	Anastajia Babet; Mauritius	Marjorie Hoareau; Réunion	not awarded
Snatch	+87 kg	Raima Miadantsoa; Madagascar	Chakira Rose; Seychelles	Cassandra Almanzy; Réunion
Clean & jerk	+87 kg	Chakira Rose; Seychelles	Raima Miadantsoa; Madagascar	Cassandra Almanzy; Réunion
Total	+87 kg	Chakira Rose; Seychelles	Raima Miadantsoa; Madagascar	Cassandra Almanzy; Réunion

=== Wrestling ===
Event	Gold	Silver	Bronze
Mixed freestyle team	Réunion; Marc Emmanuel Legros; Veda Elamri; Loïc Jullien; Emma Lecompte; Océane Mahavand; Carole Lecomte	Madagascar; Bienvenu Andriamalala; Aimé Rakotoniaina; Mitantsoa Randriamiarisoa; Victorine Rasoarimalala; Malala Soloniaina; Jessy Andrianantoandro	Mauritius; Kenneth Leopold; Zainuddine Toomun; Ismaël Ravina; Marie Gracie Allas; Cindy Marcelin; Jenelly Raphaël
Men's freestyle 57 kg	Kenneth Leopold; Mauritius	Bienvenu Andriamalala; Madagascar	Marc Emmanuel Legros; Réunion
Men's freestyle 61 kg	Latuf Madi; Comoros	Julien Randrianarimalala; Madagascar	Guyliane Bandou; Mauritius
Men's freestyle 61 kg	Latuf Madi; Comoros	Julien Randrianarimalala; Madagascar	Loïc Jolivet; Réunion
Men's freestyle 65 kg	Yanisse Madi; Comoros	Faly Randrianantoandro; Madagascar	Christophe Fibac; Réunion
Men's freestyle 65 kg	Yanisse Madi; Comoros	Faly Randrianantoandro; Madagascar	Naldo Prosper; Mauritius
Men's freestyle 70 kg	Valentin Damour; Réunion	Todisoa Rakotonantoandro; Madagascar	Gilbert Émilie; Mauritius
Men's freestyle 70 kg	Valentin Damour; Réunion	Todisoa Rakotonantoandro; Madagascar	Mahamoud Ahmed; Comoros
Men's freestyle 74 kg	Veda Elamri; Réunion	Aimé Rakotoniaina; Madagascar	Zainuddine Toomun; Mauritius
Men's freestyle 79 kg	Jonah Sevamy Tailamin; Réunion	Totiana Razafinjato; Madagascar	Hanson Ramsaran; Mauritius
Men's freestyle 86 kg	Herinirina Andriamalala; Madagascar	Emmanuel Robert; Réunion	Jean Frédéric Marianne; Mauritius
Men's freestyle 92 kg	Joseph Cupidon; Mauritius	Benoît Dréan; Réunion	Rivo Faralovatahiry; Madagascar
Men's freestyle 97 kg	Ismaël Ravina; Mauritius	Mitantsoa Randriamiarisoa; Madagascar	Loïc Jullien; Réunion
Men's freestyle 125 kg	Elvis Rakotoarisoa; Madagascar	Jean-Pascal Polimon; Mauritius	Alexandre Barret; Réunion
Women's freestyle 50 kg	Victorine Rasoarimalala; Madagascar	Wendy Veerapen; Mauritius	not awarded
Women's freestyle 53 kg	Elisa Rasoanantenaina; Madagascar	Emma Lecompte; Réunion	Marie Gracie Allas; Mauritius
Women's freestyle 55 kg	Solo Mioranirina; Madagascar	Marie Alexa Camoins; Mauritius	not awarded
Women's freestyle 57 kg	Cléonia Perrine; Mauritius	Natacha Rahaingomalala; Madagascar	Océane Mahavand; Réunion
Women's freestyle 59 kg	Malala Soloniaina; Madagascar	Cindy Marcelin; Mauritius	not awarded
Women's freestyle 62 kg	Françoise Rasoarimalala; Madagascar	Camille Grondin; Réunion	Vihanshy Kanapetradu; Mauritius
Women's freestyle 65 kg	Julie Guillaume; Réunion	Lalanirina Rakotoarisoa; Madagascar	Mélissa Agathe; Mauritius
Women's freestyle 68 kg	Carole Lecomte; Réunion	Ando Rakotoarivelo; Madagascar	Sephora Aza; Mauritius
Women's freestyle 72 kg	Jessy Andrianantoandro; Madagascar	Jenelly Raphaël; Mauritius	not awarded
Women's freestyle 76 kg	Céleste Vilbrun; Mauritius	Wafa Arbaoui; Réunion	Fanirisoa Razafindratsara; Madagascar
