= List of Mauritian records in Olympic weightlifting =

The following are the national records in Olympic weightlifting in Mauritius. Records are maintained in each weight class for the snatch lift, clean and jerk lift, and the total for both lifts by the Mauritius Amateur Weightlifters and Powerlifters Association.

== Current records ==
=== Women ===
Event	Record	Athlete	Date	Meet	Place	Ref
48 kg
Snatch						
Clean & Jerk						
Total						
53 kg
Snatch						
Clean & Jerk						
Total						
58 kg
Snatch						
Clean & Jerk						
Total						
63 kg
Snatch	kg					
Clean & Jerk	kg					
Total	kg					
69 kg
Snatch	97 kg	Ketty Lent	28 July 2026	Commonwealth Games	Glasgow, United Kingdom	
Clean & Jerk	120 kg	Ketty Lent	28 July 2026	Commonwealth Games	Glasgow, United Kingdom	
Total	217 kg	Ketty Lent	28 July 2026	Commonwealth Games	Glasgow, United Kingdom	
77 kg
Snatch						
Clean & Jerk						
Total						
86 kg
Snatch						
Clean & Jerk						
Total						
+86 kg
Snatch						
Clean & Jerk						
Total						

== Historical records ==
=== Men (2018–2025) ===
Event	Record	Athlete	Date	Meet	Place	Ref
55 kg
Snatch	91 kg	Emile Gwendal	26 August 2023	Indian Ocean Island Games	Antananarivo, Madagascar	
Clean & Jerk	112 kg	Emile Gwendal	10 March 2024	African Games	Accra, Ghana	
Total	204 kg	Emile Gwendal	10 March 2024	African Games	Accra, Ghana	
61 kg
Snatch	78 kg	Antonin Brousse de Gersigny	26 August 2023	Indian Ocean Island Games	Antananarivo, Madagascar	
Clean & Jerk	99 kg	Antonin Brousse de Gersigny	26 August 2023	Indian Ocean Island Games	Antananarivo, Madagascar	
Total	177 kg	Antonin Brousse de Gersigny	26 August 2023	Indian Ocean Island Games	Antananarivo, Madagascar	
67 kg
Snatch	105 kg	Marc Jonathan Coret	31 July 2022	Commonwealth Games	Marston Green, United Kingdom	
Clean & Jerk	136 kg	Marc Jonathan Coret	31 July 2022	Commonwealth Games	Marston Green, United Kingdom	
Total	241 kg	Marc Jonathan Coret	31 July 2022	Commonwealth Games	Marston Green, United Kingdom	
73 kg
Snatch	110 kg	Louis Martinson	27 August 2023	Indian Ocean Island Games	Antananarivo, Madagascar	
Clean & Jerk	142 kg	Louis Martinson	11 March 2024	African Games	Accra, Ghana	
Total	252 kg	Louis Martinson	11 March 2024	African Games	Accra, Ghana	
81 kg
Snatch	127 kg	Dinesh Pandoo	28 August 2023	Indian Ocean Island Games	Antananarivo, Madagascar	
Clean & Jerk	162 kg	Dinesh Pandoo	28 August 2023	Indian Ocean Island Games	Antananarivo, Madagascar	
Total	289 kg	Dinesh Pandoo	28 August 2023	Indian Ocean Island Games	Antananarivo, Madagascar	
89 kg
Snatch	132 kg	Nigel Augustine	12 March 2024	African Games	Accra, Ghana	
Clean & Jerk	165 kg	Nigel Augustine	28 August 2023	Indian Ocean Island Games	Antananarivo, Madagascar	
Total	295 kg	Nigel Augustine	12 March 2024	African Games	Accra, Ghana	
96 kg
Snatch	141 kg	Cédric Coret	2 August 2022	Commonwealth Games	Marston Green, United Kingdom	
Clean & Jerk	166 kg	Cédric Coret	13 December 2021	World Championships	Tashkent, Uzbekistan	
Total	301 kg	Cédric Coret	2 August 2022	Commonwealth Games	Marston Green, United Kingdom	
102 kg
Snatch	140 kg	Khelwin Juboo	May 2023	African Championships	Tunis, Tunisia	
Clean & Jerk	180 kg	Khelwin Juboo	May 2023	African Championships	Tunis, Tunisia	
Total	320 kg	Khelwin Juboo	May 2023	African Championships	Tunis, Tunisia	
109 kg
Snatch	141 kg	Khelwin Juboo	14 March 2024	African Games	Accra, Ghana	
Clean & Jerk	188 kg	Khelwin Juboo	14 March 2024	African Games	Accra, Ghana	
Total	356 kg	Khelwin Juboo	14 March 2024	African Games	Accra, Ghana	
+109 kg
Snatch						
Clean & Jerk						
Total						

=== Women (2018–2025) ===
Event	Record	Athlete	Date	Meet	Place	Ref
45 kg
Snatch	53 kg	Pasnin Sheridane	26 August 2023	Indian Ocean Island Games	Antananarivo, Madagascar	
Clean & Jerk	66 kg	Pasnin Sheridane	26 August 2023	Indian Ocean Island Games	Antananarivo, Madagascar	
Total	119 kg	Pasnin Sheridane	26 August 2023	Indian Ocean Island Games	Antananarivo, Madagascar	
49 kg
Snatch	76 kg	Roilya Ranaivosoa	2 November 2018	World Championships	Ashgabat, Turkmenistan	
Clean & Jerk	97 kg	Roilya Ranaivosoa	2 November 2018	World Championships	Ashgabat, Turkmenistan	
Total	173 kg	Roilya Ranaivosoa	2 November 2018	World Championships	Ashgabat, Turkmenistan	
55 kg
Snatch	82 kg	Roilya Ranaivosoa	21 December 2019	Qatar Cup	Doha, Qatar	
Clean & Jerk	75 kg	Marie Maeva Matelot	27 August 2023	Indian Ocean Island Games	Antananarivo, Madagascar	
Total	134 kg	Marie Maeva Matelot	27 August 2023	Indian Ocean Island Games	Antananarivo, Madagascar	
59 kg
Snatch	59 kg	Doushka Gopaloodoo	27 August 2023	Indian Ocean Island Games	Antananarivo, Madagascar	
Clean & Jerk	74 kg	Doushka Gopaloodoo	27 August 2023	Indian Ocean Island Games	Antananarivo, Madagascar	
Total	133 kg	Doushka Gopaloodoo	27 August 2023	Indian Ocean Island Games	Antananarivo, Madagascar	
64 kg
Snatch	80 kg	Seforah Lent	12 March 2024	African Games	Accra, Ghana	
Clean & Jerk	86 kg	Seforah Lent	12 March 2024	African Games	Accra, Ghana	
Total	166 kg	Seforah Lent	12 March 2024	African Games	Accra, Ghana	
71 kg
Snatch	97 kg	Ketty Lent	10 December 2023	IWF Grand Prix II	Doha, Qatar	
Clean & Jerk	118 kg	Ketty Lent	10 December 2023	IWF Grand Prix II	Doha, Qatar	
Total	215 kg	Ketty Lent	10 December 2023	IWF Grand Prix II	Doha, Qatar	
76 kg
Snatch	95 kg	Ketty Lent	28 August 2023	Indian Ocean Island Games	Antananarivo, Madagascar	
Clean & Jerk	120 kg	Ketty Lent	28 August 2023	Indian Ocean Island Games	Antananarivo, Madagascar	
Total	215 kg	Ketty Lent	28 August 2023	Indian Ocean Island Games	Antananarivo, Madagascar	
81 kg
Snatch	88 kg	Marie Sunee	28 August 2023	Indian Ocean Island Games	Antananarivo, Madagascar	
Clean and Jerk	100 kg	Marie Sunee	28 August 2023	Indian Ocean Island Games	Antananarivo, Madagascar	
Total	188 kg	Marie Sunee	28 August 2023	Indian Ocean Island Games	Antananarivo, Madagascar	
87 kg
Snatch	85 kg	Alison Sunee	May 2023	African Championships	Tunis, Tunisia	
Clean and Jerk	106 kg	Alison Sunee	May 2023	African Championships	Tunis, Tunisia	
Total	191 kg	Alison Sunee	May 2023	African Championships	Tunis, Tunisia	
+87 kg
Snatch	95 kg	Shalinee Valaydon	April 2019	African Championships	Cairo, Egypt	
Clean and Jerk	115 kg	Shalinee Valaydon	April 2019	African Championships	Cairo, Egypt	
Total	210 kg	Shalinee Valaydon	April 2019	African Championships	Cairo, Egypt	

== Historical records ==
=== Women (1998–2018) ===
Event	Record	Athlete	Date	Meet	Place	Ref
48 kg
Snatch	80 kg	Roilya Ranaivosoa	21 November 2015	World Championships	Houston, United States	
Clean and Jerk	100 kg	Roilya Ranaivosoa	21 November 2015	World Championships	Houston, United States	
Total	180 kg	Roilya Ranaivosoa	21 November 2015	World Championships	Houston, United States	
53 kg
Snatch						
Clean and Jerk						
Total						
58 kg
Snatch						
Clean and Jerk						
Total						
63 kg
Snatch						
Clean and Jerk						
Total						
69 kg
Snatch						
Clean and Jerk						
Total						
75 kg
Snatch						
Clean and Jerk						
Total						
90 kg
Snatch						
Clean and Jerk						
Total						
+90 kg
Snatch						
Clean and Jerk						
Total						
