= Madagascar at the 2019 African Games =

- Flag of Madagascar
- IOC code: MAD
- NOC: Comité Olympique Malgache

in Rabat, Morocco 19 August 2019 – 31 August 2019
- Competitors: 59 (36 men and 23 women) in 13 sports
- Medals Ranked 10th: Gold 6 Silver 4 Bronze 2 Total 12

African Games appearances
- 1965; 1973; 1978; 1987; 1991; 1995; 1999; 2003; 2007; 2011; 2015; 2019; 2023

Madagascar competed at the 2019 African Games held from 19 to 31 August 2019 in Rabat, Morocco. Athletes representing Madagascar won six gold medals, four silver medals and two bronze medals. The men's team won the gold medal in 3x3 basketball and all other medals were won in weightlifting.

== Medal summary ==
=== Medal table ===
Medal	Name	Sport	Event	Date
Gold	Solondrainy Alpha Jean Arnol; Randriamampionona Elly; Rakotonirina Fiary Jonhson; Ratianarivo Livio Rocheteau	3x3 basketball	Men's tournament	25 August
Gold	Jean Ramiarimanana	Weightlifting	Men's 55 kg	25 August
Gold	Jean Ramiarimanana	Weightlifting	Men's 55 kg Clean & Jerk	25 August
Gold	Rosina Randafiarison	Weightlifting	Women's 45 kg	25 August
Gold	Rosina Randafiarison	Weightlifting	Women's 45 kg Snatch	25 August
Gold	Rosina Randafiarison	Weightlifting	Women's 45 kg Clean & Jerk	25 August
Silver	Ramiarimanana Elariont Ricardo	Weightlifting	Men's 55 kg Snatch	25 August
Silver	Tojonirina Andriantsitohaina	Weightlifting	Men's 67 kg Snatch	26 August
Silver	Eric Andriantsitohaina	Weightlifting	Men's 61 kg Clean & Jerk	26 August
Silver	Eric Andriantsitohaina	Weightlifting	Men's 61 kg	26 August
Bronze	Eric Andriantsitohaina	Weightlifting	Men's 61 kg Snatch	26 August
Bronze	Jules Andriamahefa	Weightlifting	Men's 61 kg	26 August

Medals by sport
Sport	1st place, gold medalist(s)	2nd place, silver medalist(s)	3rd place, bronze medalist(s)	Total
3x3 basketball	1	0	0	1
Weightlifting	5	4	2	11
Total	6	4	2	12

== 3x3 basketball ==
Solondrainy Alpha Jean Arnol, Randriamampionona Elly, Rakotonirina Fiary Jonhson and Ratianarivo Livio Rocheteau represented Madagascar in 3x3 basketball. They won the gold medal in the men's tournament.

== Archery ==
Gabriel Thiery Randrianasoloniaiko competed in archery in the men's individual recurve event.

== Athletics ==
Madagascar competed in several events in athletics.

Claudine Njarasoa competed in the women's 100 metres event. She advanced to the semifinals and did not advance to compete in the final.

Vanessa Embony competed in the women's 200 metres event. She did not advance to compete in the semifinals.

== Boxing ==
Andrianarivelo Marco Jerome (men's 57kg) and Heriniaina Nomenjanahary Tony (men's 52kg) competed in boxing.

Marco Jerome lost his only match against Everisto Mulenga.

Nomenjanahary Tony advanced to the quarterfinals where he was eliminated by Rajab Otukile Mahommed.

== Fencing ==
Jolan Andriamamonjy, Tonny Andriamamonjy, Jennifer Capriati Rahariniaina and Marie Solange Razafindrazaka represented Madagascar in fencing.

== Judo ==
Eight athletes represented Madagascar in judo: Herikanto Kevin Royce Andriamanoelina, Andriambololona Hajanirina Zo, Rambeloson Lita, Fetra Ranaivoarisoa, Aina Laura Rasoanaivo Razafy, Setra Razafialison, Bernardin Karamaly Sergio and Ratsiavy Norah Tieffenbach.

== Karate ==
Madagascar competed in karate.

== Table tennis ==
Madagascar competed in table tennis.

== Taekwondo ==
Madagascar competed in taekwondo.

== Tennis ==
Madagascar competed in tennis.

== Weightlifting ==
Madagascar competed in weightlifting. In total weightlifters representing Madagascar won five gold medals, four silver medals and two bronze medals and the country finished 3rd in the weightlifting medal table.

Jean Ramiarimanana won the gold medals in the Men's 55 kg Snatch and Men's 55 kg events and the silver medal in the Men's 55 kg Clean & Jerk event.

Eric Andriantsitohaina won the silver medals in the Men's 61 kg Clean & Jerk and Men's 61 kg events and the bronze medal in the Men's 61 kg Snatch event.

Jules Andriamahefa won the bronze medal in the Men's 61 kg event.

Tojonirina Andriantsitohaina won the silver medal in the Men's 67 kg Snatch event.

Rosina Randafiarison won the gold medals in all three Women's 45 kg events.

== Wrestling ==
Two athletes represented Madagascar in wrestling: Bienvenu Andriamalala competed in the men's freestyle 57 kg event and Marie Julienne Rasendrasoa competed in the women's freestyle 57 kg event.
