= Weightlifting at the 2014 Commonwealth Games – Men's 56 kg =

Weightlifting – Men's 56 kg at the 2014 Commonwealth Games
- Venue: Clyde Auditorium
- Dates: 24 July 2014
- Competitors: 15 from 12 nations
- Winning total weight: 248 kg

Medalists
gold medal	Sukhen Dey	India
silver medal	Zulhelmi Md Pisol	Malaysia
bronze medal	Ganesh Mali	India

The Men's 56 kg weightlifting event at the 2014 Commonwealth Games in Glasgow, Scotland, took place at Scottish Exhibition and Conference Centre on 24 July. The weightlifter from India won the gold, with a combined lift of 248 kg.

== Result ==
Rank	Athlete	Snatch (kg)				Clean & Jerk (kg)				Total
Rank	Athlete	1	2	3	Result	1	2	3	Result	Total
1st place, gold medalist(s)	Sukhen Dey (IND)	~~109~~	109	~~111~~	109	136	139	~~146~~	139	248
2nd place, silver medalist(s)	Zulhelmi Md Pisol (MAS)	105	~~105~~	108	108	133	136	137	137	245
3rd place, bronze medalist(s)	Ganesh Mali (IND)	106	110	111	111	~~133~~	~~133~~	133	133	244
4	Muhammad Shahzad (PAK)	107	~~110~~	~~110~~	107	133	~~137~~	~~138~~	133	240
5	Anrich Phillips (RSA)	95	100	103	103	130	~~135~~	135	135	238
6	Rasag Tanimowo (NGR)	95	~~97~~	~~100~~	95	125	~~130~~	130	130	225
7	Lou Guinares (NZL)	90	~~93~~	~~93~~	90	113	116	~~119~~	116	206
8	Fred Oala (PNG)	~~85~~	~~85~~	85	85	110	~~115~~	118	118	203
9	Paul Ndicka Matam (CMR)	77	82	~~85~~	82	110	~~116~~	~~116~~	110	192
10	Brito Mota (MAW)	68	70	74	74	85	~~90~~	90	90	164
11	Abdullah Adballah (TAN)	70	72	~~75~~	72	85	~~88~~	~~92~~	85	157
-	Mohd Faizal Baharom (MAS)	~~110~~	~~110~~	110	110	~~135~~	~~135~~	~~135~~	–	–
-	Sangeeth Sirisenage (SRI)	~~100~~	~~100~~	~~100~~	100	~~130~~	~~130~~	~~130~~	–	–
-	Thilanka Palangasinghe (SRI)	105	109	~~109~~	105	~~135~~	~~139~~	~~139~~	–	–
-	Jonathan Coret (MRI)	~~94~~	~~94~~	~~95~~	–	–	–	–	–	DNF
