= Zulhelmi Pisol =

Malaysian weightlifter

Zulhelmi Md Pisol
Personal information
- Nationality: Malaysian
- Born: 22 August 1993 (age 32) Penang, Malaysia
- Height: 158 cm (5 ft 2 in)
- Weight: 56 kg (123 lb)

Sport
- Country: Malaysia
- Sport: Weightlifting
- Event: 56 kg
Medal record
Weightlifting
Representing Malaysia
Commonwealth Games
Silver medal – second place	2014 Glasgow	56 kg
- Updated on 13:09, 1 August 2014 (UTC)

Zulhelmi Md Pisol (born 22 August 1993) is a Malaysian weightlifter. He won the silver medal in the men's 56 kg event at the 2014 Commonwealth Games.
