= Fathimath Dheema Ali =

Maldivian table tennis player (born 2007)

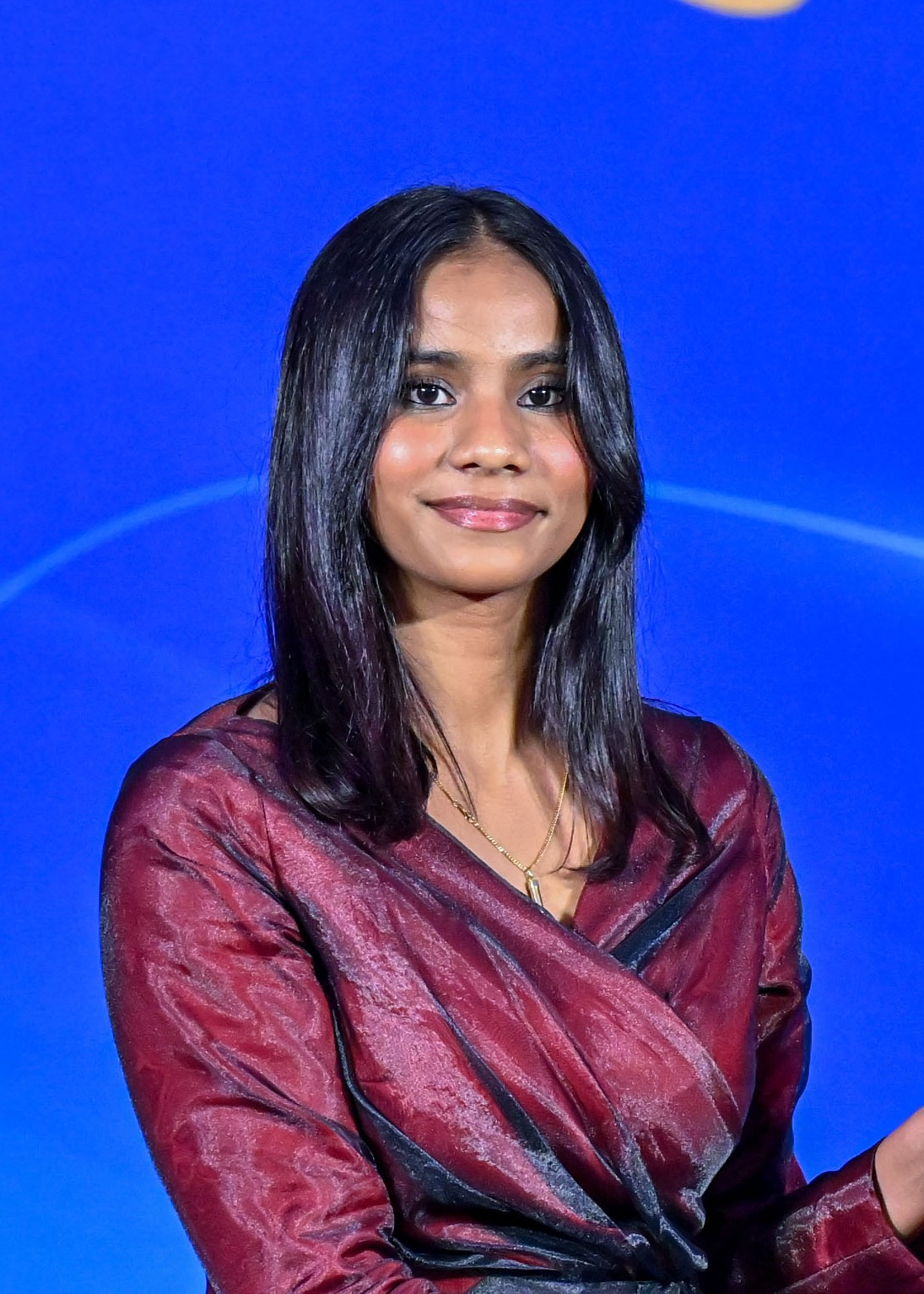
- Ali in 2026

Personal information
- Native name: ފާތިމަތު ދީމާ ޢަލީ
- Born: 14 September 2007 (age 18) Colombo, Sri Lanka
- Height: 167 cm (5 ft 6 in)
- Weight: 52 kg (115 lb)

Sport
- Sport: Table tennis
- Playing style: Right-handed
Medal record
Women's table tennis
Representing Maldives
Indian Ocean Island Games
Gold medal – first place	2019 Mauritius	Singles
Gold medal – first place	2019 Mauritius	Women's doubles
Gold medal – first place	2019 Mauritius	Team
Gold medal – first place	2023 Madagascar	Singles
Gold medal – first place	2023 Madagascar	Women's doubles
Gold medal – first place	2023 Madagascar	Team
Bronze medal – third place	2023 Madagascar	Mixed doubles
Islamic Solidarity Games
Bronze medal – third place	2021 Konya	Team

Fathimath Dheema Ali (Dhivehi: ފާތިމަތު ދީމާ ޢަލީ; born 14 September 2007) is a Maldivian table tennis player. She qualified for the 2024 Summer Olympics, becoming the first Maldivian to qualify for the Olympics (previous entrants were on a quota) as well as the nation's first Olympic table tennis player.

== Biography ==
Fathimath Dheema Ali was born on 14 September 2007 in Sri Lanka, to Maldivian parents. When she was six, her father suggested she try out a sport, and after a badminton coach turned her down for being too short, she decided to try out table tennis. She started the sport by playing on the dining table at her home. While on a break from school at age eight, in 2016, she entered a tournament in Malaysia and won the under-11 competition. Later in the year, she participated at the Sri Lanka junior national championship and won the under-10 tournament, also being ranked in the top four of the under-12 tournament.

Her family moved to the Maldives in 2018 and Ali competed at the Maldivian National Championship. In her second year at the event, she won the national championship, becoming the nation's youngest-ever winner. Ranked the number one table tennis player in the Maldives, she was selected to both the junior and senior national teams. In 2018, when she was 10 years old and in grade 5, she participated at the World Team Table Tennis Championships, setting the record for youngest-ever competitor; her teammate was a quarter-century older, at age 35.

Later in 2018, Ali won silver at the South Asian Junior Table Tennis Championships in the under-12 event. She qualified for the Asian Junior Table Tennis Championship and placed second. Her medal made her the first international table tennis medalist for the Maldives, and qualified her for the World Junior Table Tennis Championship. However, at the request of her parents, she passed over the world junior championships to represent the Maldives at the Indian Ocean Island Games. There, at age 11, she won three gold medals, winning the singles, doubles and women's team events. For her performance, the Maldivian government gifted her 535,000 MVR and began funding all her training.

By April 2021, Ali was ranked by World Table Tennis as the eighth-best under-15 competitor in the world. She participated at the 2021 Islamic Solidarity Games and won the bronze medal in the team event. In the Maldives Sports Awards 2021, she won third place for Sportswoman of the Year, Most Promising Young Athlete of the Year Award, and Best Sportswoman in Table Tennis.

In 2022, she competed at the Commonwealth Games, winning the first match before losing the second. She also was named the recipient of an International Olympic Committee (IOC) scholarship that year. During that year's Maldives Sports Awards, she won Sportswoman of the Year, Most Promising Young Athlete of the Year Award, and Best Sportswoman in Table Tennis. She was the Maldives flag bearer at the 2023 Indian Ocean Island Games and won three gold medals and a bronze. In the Maldives Sports Awards 2023 and 2024, she won the same awards as the previous years.

In May 2024, Ali won the singles event at the South Asian Qualification Tournament, thus qualifying her for the 2024 Summer Olympics. She became the first person to ever qualify for the Olympics from the Maldives, as previous entrants were through a quota.

In July 2026, Ali won the highest school education award by placing first globally and in Maldives in English in her Cambridge O-Level examinations. She is currently studying Business Studies at Taylor's University.
