= Brito Mota =

Malawian weightlifter

Personal information
- Full name: Brito Mota
- Born: 2 June 1992 (age 34)
- Weight: 55.07 kg (121.4 lb)

Sport
- Country: Malawi
- Sport: Weightlifting
- Weight class: 56 kg
- Team: National team
- Updated on 19 October 2016

Brito Mota (born 2 June 1992) is a Malawian male weightlifter, competing in the 56 kg category and representing Malawi at international competitions. He participated at the 2014 Commonwealth Games in the 56 kg event.

== Major competitions ==
Year	Venue	Weight	Snatch (kg)				Clean & Jerk (kg)				Total	Rank
Year	Venue	Weight	1	2	3	Rank	1	2	3	Rank	Total	Rank
Commonwealth Games
2014	Glasgow, Scotland	56 kg	68	70	74	—N/a	85	~~90~~	90	—N/a	164	10
