= Sukhen Dey =

Indian weightlifter (born 1989)

Personal information
- Nationality: Indian
- Born: 28 March 1989 (age 37) Andul, Howrah, West Bengal, India
- Height: 1.68 m (5 ft 6 in) (2014)
- Weight: 56 kg (123 lb) (2014)

Sport
- Country: India
- Sport: Weightlifting
- Event: 56 kg
Medal record
Men's weightlifting
Representing India
Commonwealth Games
| Gold medal – first place | 2014 Glasgow | 56 kg |
| Silver medal – second place | 2010 Delhi | 56 kg |
- Updated on 25 July 2014

Sukhen Dey (born 28 March 1989) is an Indian weightlifter. He won gold medal in the men's 56 kg weight class at the 2014 Commonwealth Games in Glasgow, Scotland and previously won a silver medal at the 2010 Commonwealth Games at Delhi. Dey left behind Malaysia's Mohd Pisol Zulheimi with the silver medal and Ganesh Mali with bronze medal.
