= 2018 African Weightlifting Championships =

International weightlifting competition

2018 African Championships
- Host city: Mahébourg, Mauritius
- Dates: August

The 2018 African Weightlifting Championships took place in Mahébourg, Mauritius in August of that year.

These are the results.

== 56 kg Men ==
Rank	Name	Born	Nation	B.weight	Group	Snatch	CI&Jerk	Total
1	AMDRIAITISTOUATMA Eric Le	01.01.1991	MAD	55.82	A	100	132	232
2	LARIKI Elhabib	03.11.1987	ALG	55.58	A	95	120	215
3	MADANAMOOTHOO Jack Dorian	19.04.2001	MRI	56.00	A	85	105	190

== 62 kg Men ==
Rank	Name	Born	Nation	B.weight	Group	Snatch	CI&Jerk	Total
1	CORET Marc Jonathan	13.04.1989	MRI	61.96	A	106	135	241
2	AINOUAZANE Abdelkader	22.09.1994	ALG	61.91	A	109	130	239
3	DARYH Riaze	01.01.1989	SEY	61.41	A	80	100	180
4	ODHIAMBO Michael	01.01.2002	KEN	58.05	A	66	82	148

== 69 kg Men ==
Rank	Name	Born	Nation	B.weight	Group	Snatch	CI&Jerk	Total
1	BEN HNIA Karem	13.11.1994	TUN	68.67	A	145	175	320
2	CONFIANCE Rick Yves	24.05.1994	SEY	67.89	A	108	140	248
3	PANDOO Dinesh Jevin	25.02.2001	MRI	68.77	A	102	140	242
4	MASINDE Anthony Libasia	30.08.1989	KEN	68.59	A	101	130	231

== 77 kg Men ==
Rank	Name	Born	Nation	B.weight	Group	Snatch	CI&Jerk	Total
1	ELSAYED Ahmed Adel Mohamed	10.07.1997	EGY	76.87	A	141	180	321
2	LUKOSE Webstar Ndoli	19.05.1989	KEN	76.30	A	131	156	287
3	MADANAMOOTHOO Jack Anthony	13.01.1999	MRI	76.77	A	123	140	263

== 85 kg Men ==
Rank	Name	Born	Nation	B.weight	Group	Snatch	CI&Jerk	Total
1	BAHLOUL Ramzi	18.10.1989	TUN	79.00	A	131	168	299
2	AROMO Maurice Oduor	22.10.1988	KEN	82.82	A	107	136	243
3	SOLOMON Dikabelo	23.07.1995	BOT	82.50	A	100	135	235
4	FELICITE Jeremy Andy	24.06.2000	MRI	77.87	A	105	126	231
5	FELICITE Valentino	14.02.1995	MRI	81.99	A	101	120	221
6	SERVINA Angelo	29.01.1994	SEY	84.27	A	90	110	200
7	GAMEDZE Zwelethu Sonkhe	27.06.1999	SWZ	77.09	A	75	95	170

== 94 kg Men ==
Rank	Name	Born	Nation	B.weight	Group	Snatch	CI&Jerk	Total
1	MOHAMED Mahmoud Silem	01.01.1997	EGY	92.90	A	158	201	359
2	MESSAOUI Saddam	24.07.1991	ALG	92.80	A	151	180	331
3	NJOYA Ahmed Valdy	13.02.1999	CMR	86.90	A	135	172	307
4	KAGISO Bokang Alphius	30.03.1997	BOT	91.30	A	120	140	260
5	FARABEAU Sirous	16.02.1996	SEY	92.60	A	105	125	230

== 105 kg Men ==
Rank	Name	Born	Nation	B.weight	Group	Snatch	CI&Jerk	Total
1	RAMKH Ahmed Tolba Mohamed Elbasiony	17.07.1999	EGY	103.39	A	153	196	349
2	CHOUYA Rabeh	10.09.1988	ALG	104.70	A	148	180	328
3	HANSEL Bristol	03.07.1988	SEY	97.50	A	80	125	205

== +105 kg Men ==
Rank	Name	Born	Nation	B.weight	Group	Snatch	CI&Jerk	Total
1	BIDANI Walid	11.06.1994	ALG	136.70	A	180	210	390
2	JUBOO Khelwin	27.06.2002	MRI	108.20	A	115	140	255
3	JOORON Dhunanjay Alvin	23.06.1986	MRI	105.02	A	105	130	235

== 48 kg Women ==
Rank	Name	Born	Nation	B.weight	Group	Snatch	CI&Jerk	Total
1	SABRI Nour El Houda	28.04.2003	ALG	47.97	A	55	70	125

== 53 kg Women ==
Rank	Name	Born	Nation	B.weight	Group	Snatch	CI&Jerk	Total
1	RANAIVOSOA Marie Hanitra Roilya	14.11.1990	MRI	52.90	A	80	100	180
2	THELEMAQUE Katsia	28.02.1989	SEY	49.57	A	50	65	115

== 58 kg Women ==
Rank	Name	Born	Nation	B.weight	Group	Snatch	CI&Jerk	Total
1	LAGHOUATI Fatima Zohra	27.02.1999	ALG	57.28	A	64	81	145
2	LANGAT Winny Chepngeno	03.07.1988	KEN	57.80	A	63	75	138
3	GOPALOODOO Priyanka	01.01.2000	MRI	56.21	A	43	52	95

== 63 kg Women ==
Rank	Name	Born	Nation	B.weight	Group	Snatch	CI&Jerk	Total
1	RAVOLOLONIAINA Elisa Vania	24.02.1992	MAD	61.49	A	85	95	180
2	LENT Ketty	25.01.2001	MRI	62.58	A	77	101	178
3	APAYA Aurelie Emilia Ariane	01.01.1991	MRI	62.84	A	60	70	130

== 69 kg Women ==
Rank	Name	Born	Nation	B.weight	Group	Snatch	CI&Jerk	Total
1	PRETORIUS Mona	12.08.1988	RSA	63.69	A	82	112	194
2	LABONNE Emmanuella	04.09.1985	MRI	68.96	A	86	107	193
3	CHERRARA Ikram	06.06.1998	ALG	65.23	A	81	95	176

== 75 kg Women ==
Rank	Name	Born	Nation	B.weight	Group	Snatch	CI&Jerk	Total
1	SUNEE Alison Marie Leroy	20.07.1999	MRI	71.41	A	75	80	155

== 90 kg Women ==
Rank	Name	Born	Nation	B.weight	Group	Snatch	CI&Jerk	Total
1	HIRECH Bouchra Fatima Zohra	22.08.2000	ALG	78.64	A	76	102	178
2	ROSE Chakira Mary	26.03.2001	SEY	77.99	A	55	75	130
3	BABET Marie Megan Anastajia	20.09.2000	MRI	84.73	A	45	55	100

== +90 kg Women ==
Rank	Name	Born	Nation	B.weight	Group	Snatch	CI&Jerk	Total
1	ABBAS Halima Abdelazim Sedky	05.05.1995	EGY	132.07	A	113	150	263
2	VALAYDON Shalinee	13.04.1986	MRI	116.13	A	90	120	210
