= Jonathan Coret =

Mauritian weightlifter

Personal information
- Full name: Jonathan Coret
- Born: 13 April 1989 (age 37)
- Weight: 55.11 kg (121.5 lb)

Sport
- Country: Mauritius
- Sport: Weightlifting
- Weight class: 56 kg
- Team: National team
- Updated on 19 October 2016

Jonathan Coret (born 13 April 1989) is a Mauritian male weightlifter, competing in the 56 kg category and representing Mauritius at international competitions. He participated at the 2014 Commonwealth Games in the 56 kg event.

== Major competitions ==
| Year | Venue | Weight | Snatch (kg) | | | | Clean & Jerk (kg) | | | | Total | Rank |
| Year | Venue | Weight | 1 | 2 | 3 | Rank | 1 | 2 | 3 | Rank | Total | Rank |
Commonwealth Games
| 2014 | Glasgow, Scotland | 56 kg | ~~94~~ | ~~94~~ | ~~95~~ | —N/a | --- | --- | --- | —N/a | 0 | --- |
