= Éric Andriantsitohaina =

Malagasy weightlifter (born 1991)

Personal information
- Born: 21 July 1991 (age 34)

Sport
- Country: Madagascar
- Sport: Weightlifting
Medal record
Men's weightlifting
Representing Madagascar
African Championships
| Gold medal – first place | 2019 Cairo | 55 kg |
| Silver medal – second place | 2016 Yaoundé | 56 kg |
| Silver medal – second place | 2017 Vacoas | 56 kg |
| Bronze medal – third place | 2021 Nairobi | 61 kg |

Éric Herman Andriantsitohaina (born 21 July 1991) is a Malagasy weightlifter. He represented Madagascar at the 2019 African Games held in Rabat, Morocco, and he won the silver medal in the men's 61 kg event. Four years earlier, he won the bronze medal in the men's 56 kg event at the 2015 African Games held in Brazzaville, Republic of the Congo.

In that same year, he also won the gold medal in the men's 55 kg event at the 2019 African Weightlifting Championships held in Cairo, Egypt. He won the bronze medal in his event at the 2021 African Weightlifting Championships held in Nairobi, Kenya.

In 2021, he competed in the men's 61 kg event at the 2020 Summer Olympics in Tokyo, Japan.

His brother Tojonirina Andriantsitohaina is also a competitive weightlifter.

Olympic Games
| Preceded by Mialitiana Clerc | Flag bearer for Madagascar; Tokyo 2020 with Damiella Nomenjanahary | Succeeded by Mialitiana Clerc; Mathieu Neumuller |
