= Vania Ravololoniaina =

Malagasy weightlifter

Elisa Ravololoniaina
Personal information
- Nationality: Malagasy
- Born: 24 February 1992 (age 34)
- Height: 1.65 m (5 ft 5 in)
- Weight: 62 kg (137 lb)

Sport
- Country: Madagascar
- Sport: Weightlifting
- Event: Women's 63 kg

Elisa Vania Ravololoniaina (born 24 February 1992) is a Malagasy weightlifter.

She competed at the 2016 Summer Olympics in Rio de Janeiro, in the women's 63 kg, where she finished in 12th place.
