= Rosina Randafiarison =

Malagasy weightlifter (born 1999)

Personal information
- Nationality: Malagasy
- Born: 29 December 1999 (age 26) Majunga, Madagascar
- Height: 146 cm (4 ft 9 in)

Sport
- Country: Madagascar
- Sport: Weightlifting
- Events: 45 kg 48 kg 49 kg

Achievements and titles
- Personal bests: Total: 180 kg (49 kg, 2024)
Medal record
Women's weightlifting
Representing Madagascar
World Championships
Silver medal – second place	2023 Riyadh	45 kg
African Games
Gold medal – first place	2019 Rabat	45 kg

Rosina Randafiarison (born 29 December 1999) is a Malagasy weightlifter. She won the silver medal in the women's 45 kg event at the 2023 World Weightlifting Championships, becoming the first athlete from Madagascar to win a World Championships medal in an Olympic sport. She also won silver medals in the individual snatch and clean and jerk at the championships.

An African Games gold medallist and multiple African champion, Randafiarison has competed internationally in the 45 kg, 48 kg and 49 kg categories. She represented Madagascar at the 2024 Summer Olympics, where she finished tenth in the women's 49 kg event and set African records in both lifts and the combined total. She was one of Madagascar's flag-bearers at both the opening and closing ceremonies.

Originally from Mahajanga, Randafiarison began weightlifting at the age of 15 and later moved to Antananarivo to join the national team. She was appointed a knight of Madagascar's National Order of Merit in 2022.

== Biography ==
Randafiarison was born on 29 December 1999 in Mahajanga, also known as Majunga. She began weightlifting at the age of 15 after her father told her about a local gym. She liked the gym's atmosphere and began entering competitions. She later moved to Antananarivo to continue training and join the national team. In a 2024 interview with Svenska Dagbladet, she recalled initially feeling out of place among the muscular men training at the gym, but said that she soon became comfortable. She added that her friends were surprised by her taking up the sport and joked with her that weightlifting would make her look like a man.

She paused her studies at Madagascar's national distance education centre in Mahajanga to concentrate on weightlifting. As of April 2020, she planned to resume her education. By October 2023, she was studying communication. She is married to Claudio Fanantenana Randrianavalona, who is also a weightlifter. He was a gold medallist at the 2023 Indian Ocean Island Games.

== Weightlifting career ==
=== Early career ===
At the 2016 African Weightlifting Championships in Yaoundé, Cameroon, Randafiarison competed in the women's 48 kg category. She won bronze in the snatch with a lift of 62 kg and finished fourth overall with a combined total of 137 kg. At the following year's African championships in Vacoas, Mauritius, she won silver in the snatch, clean and jerk, and total. Her best lifts were 60 kg and 70 kg respectively, giving her a total of 130 kg behind Roilya Ranaivosoa of Mauritius who had a total of 171 kg. In December 2018, Randafiarison won the women's 45 kg event at the IWF International Solidarity Championships with a total of 140 kg.

Randafiarison won the women's 45 kg title at the African championships in Cairo in April 2019. She took gold in all three events with a 70 kg snatch, an 80 kg clean and jerk and a 150 kg total. Her snatch and total lifts at the championships were recognised as junior women's African records. Her snatch result improved the African record from 67 kg to 70 kg.

She also won three gold medals at the 2019 Indian Ocean Island Games in Mauritius. Later that year, she won three gold medals in the same category at the 2019 African Games in Rabat, Morocco. She lifted 70 kg in the snatch and 85 kg in the clean and jerk for a total of 155 kg. In September, she won the 49 kg category at the African Junior Championships in Kampala, Uganda, with a total of 157 kg. At the World Championships in Pattaya, Thailand, in September, she totalled 155 kg and finished eighth in the women's 45 kg event.

Randafiarison won the women's 45 kg event at the African Championship (Zone 3) in November 2019 with a 71 kg snatch and an 85 kg clean and jerk. Her snatch and 156 kg total were African senior records. She finished 2019 with 16 continental and regional gold medals. She called for Madagascar to provide better rewards, financial compensation and support for athletes' futures.

Randafiarison identified qualification for the 2020 Tokyo Olympics as her main goal. Up to the COVID-19 lockdown in April 2020, she trained under the stands at Mahamasina Municipal Stadium in Antananarivo. During the lockdown, she continued training for three hours a day at home, and expressed her disappointment at the disruption to her competition plans while saying that she intended to persevere.

In a May 2021 article, Le Mauricien identified Randafiarison as Ranaivosoa's closest African challenger for an Olympic place in the 49 kg category. Randafiarison won another three gold medals at the 2021 African Weightlifting Championships, 45 kg class, in Nairobi. The championships formed part of the qualification process for the postponed Tokyo Olympics. Ranaivosoa's qualification as Africa's representative for the Tokyo Games at 49 kg was confirmed in June. Randafiarison did not compete in Tokyo.

She was appointed a knight of Madagascar's National Order of Merit by President Andry Rajoelina, in August 2022, in recognition of her success at the 2021 African championships. At the 2022 World Weightlifting Championships in Bogotá, she competed at 49 kg. She recorded a 71 kg snatch but failed all three clean and jerk attempts at 91 kg and so did not register a combined total. In a 2023 interview with Radio France Internationale, Randafiarison described 2022 as a difficult year in which repeated failures had led her to consider abandoning weightlifting. She mentioned that encouragement from the national federation president had helped her to persevere.

=== 2023: World silver medal ===
In preparation for the 2023 Indian Ocean Island Games and World Championships, Randafiarison and her three national team-mates attended a four-month training camp in China. At the Indian Ocean Island Games in Madagascar, Randafiarison won three gold medals in the women's 45 kg category.

In September, she competed in the same category at the World Championships in Riyadh, Saudi Arabia. Her final snatch of 77 kg secured silver in that discipline. She added a 93 kg clean and jerk, despite failing her last two attempts, to finish with a total of 170 kg. This placed her second behind Thailand's Siriwimon Pramongkhol, who totalled 179 kg; Cansu Bektaş of Turkey was third with 162 kg. Randafiarison's three silver medals were Madagascar's first World Championships medals in an Olympic sport. Her total was 5 kg higher than the 165 kg she had lifted at the Island Games. Her performance also established an African record in the 45 kg category.

In an interview with the Malagasy newspaper Les Nouvelles after the championships, Randafiarison said that she had wanted to add a world title to her continental and Indian Ocean successes. She attributed her performance to her training, the recent Island Games and the support of her team. Although pleased with the medals, she said that she had been unprepared for the attention that followed. She regarded the result as a step forward in her physical and mental development and continued to seek Olympic qualification.

In October, she told RFI that the national weightlifting team had no dedicated training facility. She followed her coach's programme at home twice a day and used Antananarivo's Arena Fitness gym for lifts requiring weights unavailable at home. Because the women's 45 kg category was not included in the 2024 Paris Olympics programme, Randafiarison sought qualification at 49 kg. At the IWF Grand Prix in Doha in December 2023, she totalled 155 kg, below her result in Riyadh despite competing at a higher body weight. She said that gaining weight had made movement more difficult. Her coach, Éric Herman Andriantsitohaina, said that she needed more time to adapt to the heavier category.

=== 2024: Olympics ===
Randafiarison won the 49 kg title at the African championships in Ismailia, Egypt in February 2024, with a 74 kg snatch, a 95 kg clean and jerk and a 169 kg total. In the 2024 interview with Svenska Dagbladet, she said that she had been eating six large meals a day, including substantial amounts of porridge, to gain weight for the 49 kg category. She finished the Olympic qualification period with a best total of 172 kg. Following the IWF World Cup in Phuket in April, she secured the continental qualification place. This allocation went to the highest-ranked athlete from a continent unrepresented among the top ten qualifiers. Randafiarison finished 1 kg ahead of Papua New Guinea's Dika Toua in the contest for that place. Randafiarison received an Olympic Solidarity scholarship for the Paris Games. Her qualification was formally confirmed by the International Weightlifting Federation on 21 June 2024.

In Madagascar, she prepared at Training Box in Ankorondrano, focusing on physical conditioning and technique. In July 2024, she attended a two-week training camp in Besançon, France, alongside other African weightlifters. She trained at La Française de Besançon with coach Tojo Andriantsitohaina. Before the competition, she said that she aimed to improve her personal best and break the African record.

In August 2024, she became the third woman to represent Madagascar in weightlifting at the Olympics, following Nathalia Rakotondramanana in 2012 and Elisa Vania Ravololoniaina in 2016. She competed in the women's 49 kg event at the Summer Olympics held in Paris, France. She set three African records in the snatch (80 kg), clean and jerk (100 kg), and total (180 kg), finishing in 10th place.

She was a flagbearer for Madagascar at the 2024 Summer Olympics Parade of Nations at the start of the games and for the parade of flagbearers at the closing ceremony. According to Harinelina Randriamanarivo, secretary-general of the Malagasy Olympic Committee, Randafiarison was selected as an opening-ceremony flag-bearer because she was the first Malagasy athlete to qualify for the Games, in accordance with the committee's rules.

=== Since the 2024 Olympics ===
At the 2024 World Weightlifting Championships in Manama, Bahrain, Randafiarison returned to the 45 kg category. She failed all three snatch attempts at 73 kg and did not record a total. In December that year, she retained the Malagasy national title at 49 kg; she said that she was still recovering from competing at the World Championships. Randafiarison was among 35 athletes who received victory bonuses in December 2024. The awards were presented by President Rajoelina at Iavoloha Palace in recognition of their championship medals.

In 2024, Madagascar had no national weightlifting centre, and Randafiarison trained at a gym in Antananarivo. In 2026, national coach Andriantsitohaina said that Randafiarison would resume her preparation for the 2028 Olympics. Midi Madagasikara reported that Randafiarison won the senior women's 60 kg title at the national championships held in July 2026, with a total of 156 kg.

== Results ==
In the table below, bold figures indicate the best successful lift; struck-through figures indicate failed attempts; a dash indicates that no result or rank was recorded. Separate snatch and clean and jerk rankings are not applicable at the Olympics. (Note: At the World Championships, medals are awarded separately for the snatch, clean and jerk, and combined total; Olympic medals are awarded only for the total.)

Selected weightlifting results.
Year	Venue	Weight	Snatch (kg)				Clean and jerk (kg)				Total	Rank	Ref.
Year	Venue	Weight	1	2	3	Rank	1	2	3	Rank	Total	Rank	Ref.
Summer Olympics
2024	Paris, France	49 kg	75	80	~~83~~	—N/a	95	~~100~~	100	—N/a	180	10	
World Championships
2019	Pattaya, Thailand	45 kg	65	70	~~72~~	5	85	~~90~~	~~90~~	10	155	8	
2022	Bogotá, Colombia	49 kg	71	~~75~~	~~75~~	29	~~91~~	~~91~~	~~91~~	—	—	—	
2023	Riyadh, Saudi Arabia	45 kg	70	75	77	2nd place, silver medalist(s)	93	~~100~~	~~100~~	2nd place, silver medalist(s)	170	2nd place, silver medalist(s)	
2024	Manama, Bahrain	45 kg	~~73~~	~~73~~	~~73~~	—	—	—	—	—	—	—	
IWF World Cup
2024	Phuket, Thailand	49 kg	~~75~~	75	77	21	95	~~100~~	~~100~~	18	172	16	
African Games
2019	Rabat, Morocco	45 kg	65	70	~~73~~	1st place, gold medalist(s)	80	~~85~~	85	1st place, gold medalist(s)	155	1st place, gold medalist(s)	
African Championships
2016	Yaoundé, Cameroon	48 kg	55	59	62	3rd place, bronze medalist(s)	70	~~75~~	75	5	137	4	
2017	Vacoas, Mauritius	48 kg	55	~~60~~	60	2nd place, silver medalist(s)	70	~~75~~	~~80~~	2nd place, silver medalist(s)	130	2nd place, silver medalist(s)	
2019	Cairo, Egypt	45 kg	60	68	70	1st place, gold medalist(s)	80	~~85~~	~~85~~	1st place, gold medalist(s)	150	1st place, gold medalist(s)	
2021	Nairobi, Kenya	45 kg	55	~~65~~	65	1st place, gold medalist(s)	70	~~80~~	~~80~~	1st place, gold medalist(s)	135	1st place, gold medalist(s)	
2024	Ismailia, Egypt	49 kg	70	74	~~78~~	1st place, gold medalist(s)	90	95	~~100~~	1st place, gold medalist(s)	169	1st place, gold medalist(s)	

== Notes ==
Olympic Games
Preceded by Mialitiana Clerc; Mathieu Neumuller	Flagbearer for Madagascar; Paris 2024 with Fabio Rakotoarimanana	Succeeded by Incumbent
