= Tojonirina Andriantsitohaina =

Malagasy weightlifter (born 1995)

Personal information
- Full name: Tojonirina Alain Andriantsitohaina
- Born: 26 February 1995 (age 31)

Sport
- Country: Madagascar
- Sport: Weightlifting
Medal record
Men's weightlifting
Representing Madagascar
African Championships
Gold medal – first place	2016 Yaoundé	62 kg
Gold medal – first place	2017 Vacoas	62 kg
Gold medal – first place	2021 Nairobi	67 kg
Gold medal – first place	2026 Ismailia	79 kg
Silver medal – second place	2019 Cairo	67 kg

Tojonirina Alain Andriantsitohaina (born 26 February 1995) is a Malagasy weightlifter. He is a four-time medalist, including three golds, at the African Weightlifting Championships.

In 2019, he represented Madagascar at the African Games held in Rabat, Morocco. In 2021, he finished in 11th place in the men's 67 kg event at the 2020 Summer Olympics in Tokyo, Japan.

His brother Éric Andriantsitohaina is also a competitive weightlifter.
